= 2015–16 GNK Dinamo Zagreb season =

GNK Dinamo Zagreb
2015–16 season
- Chairman: Mirko Barišić
- Manager: Zoran Mamić
- Stadium: Maksimir Stadium, Zagreb
- Prva HNL: 1st
- Croatian Cup: Winners
- UEFA Champions League: Group stage
- Top goalscorer: League: Armin Hodžić (13); All: Armin Hodžić (18)
- Highest home attendance: 23,631 vs Hajduk Split (12 July 2015 - Prva HNL)
- Lowest home attendance: 526 vs Osijek (25 September 2015 - Prva HNL)
Home colours	Away colours	Third colours

The 2015–16 season is Dinamo Zagreb's 25th season in the Croatian First Division and 104th year in existence as a football club.

== Squad ==
As of 16 April 2016

Note: Flags indicate national team as defined under FIFA eligibility rules; some limited exceptions apply. Players may hold more than one non-FIFA nationality.

No.	Pos.	Nation	Player
1	GK	CRO	Antonijo Ježina
34	GK	POR	Eduardo
98	GK	CRO	Adrian Šemper
3	DF	CRO	Mario Musa
19	DF	CRO	Josip Pivarić
22	DF	ARG	Leonardo Sigali
23	DF	CRO	Gordon Schildenfeld
26	DF	CRO	Filip Benković
35	DF	CRO	Borna Sosa
37	DF	SLO	Petar Stojanović
77	DF	ROU	Alexandru Mățel
87	DF	FRA	Jérémy Taravel
4	MF	CRO	Damir Šovšić
7	MF	CRO	Josip Brekalo
8	MF	CRO	Domagoj Antolić (captain)

No.	Pos.	Nation	Player
10	MF	POR	Paulo Machado
13	MF	POR	Gonçalo Santos
16	MF	MKD	Arijan Ademi (suspended)
18	MF	CRO	Domagoj Pavičić
24	MF	CRO	Ante Ćorić
25	MF	CRO	Bojan Knežević
30	MF	CRO	Marko Rog
2	FW	ALG	El Arbi Hillel Soudani
9	FW	CHI	Ángelo Henríquez
11	FW	CHI	Junior Fernándes
14	FW	BIH	Amer Gojak
15	FW	BIH	Armin Hodžić
20	FW	CRO	Marko Pjaca
21	FW	ESP	Dani Olmo

=== Out on loan ===
Note: Flags indicate national team as defined under FIFA eligibility rules; some limited exceptions apply. Players may hold more than one non-FIFA nationality.

No.	Pos.	Nation	Player
—	GK	CRO	Dominik Livaković (at (Croatia) NK Zagreb)
—	GK	CRO	Oliver Zelenika (at (Croatia) Lokomotiva)
—	DF	CRO	Borna Barišić (at (Croatia) Lokomotiva)
—	MF	CRO	Franko Andrijašević (at (Croatia) Lokomotiva)
—	MF	CRO	Marcelo Brozović (at (Italy) Internazionale)
—	MF	ALB	Endri Çekiçi (at (Croatia) Lokomotiva)
—	MF	CRO	Zvonko Pamić (at (Croatia) Lokomotiva)
—	MF	BIH	Goran Zakarić (at (Bosnia and Herzegovina) Zrinjski)

No.	Pos.	Nation	Player
—	FW	CRO	Duje Čop (at (Spain) Málaga)
—	FW	CRO	Kruno Ivančić (at (Croatia) Sesvete)
—	FW	CRO	Mirko Marić (at (Croatia) Lokomotiva)
—	FW	CRO	Filip Mihaljević (at (Croatia) Sesvete)
—	FW	CRO	Dejan Radonjić (at (Israel) Maccabi Tel Aviv)
—	FW	CRO	Ante Rukavina (at (Denmark) Viborg)
—	FW	CRO	Mario Šitum (at (Italy) Spezia)

== Friendlies ==
=== Pre-season ===
25 June 2015 Friendly	Dinamo Zagreb (Croatia)	1–1	(Slovakia) Žilina	Zagreb, Croatia
	Soudani 68'		William 90'	Stadium: Maksimir

28 June 2015 Friendly	Dinamo Zagreb (Croatia)	1–0	(Russia) Kuban	Zagreb, Croatia
	Fernandes 1'			Stadium: Maksimir

=== Mid-season ===
21 January 2016 Friendly	Dinamo Zagreb (Croatia)	0–0	(Slovenia) Celje	Rovinjsko Selo, Croatia
	Machado (penalty missed) 58'	Report

26 January 2016 Friendly	Dinamo Zagreb (Croatia)	0–2	(Norway) Strømsgodset	La Manga, Spain
		Report	Kastrati 40'; Pedersen 55'

29 January 2016 Friendly	Dinamo Zagreb (Croatia)	2–1	(Poland) Piast	La Manga, Spain
	Lovren 40'; Henríquez 73'	Report	Murawski 49'

30 January 2016 Friendly	Dinamo Zagreb (Croatia)	0–0	(Russia) CSKA	La Manga, Spain
		Report

2 February 2016 Friendly	Dinamo Zagreb (Croatia)	1–3	(Bulgaria) Litex	San Pedro del Pinatar, Spain
	Fernandes 62'	Report	Malinov 51'; Despodov 63'; Kolev 65'

5 February 2016 Friendly	Dinamo Zagreb (Croatia)	0–2	(Ukraine) Shakhtar	San Pedro del Pinatar, Spain
		Report	Eduardo 6'; Taison 27'

== Competitions ==
=== MAXtv Prva Liga ===
==== League table ====
Pos	Team	Pld	W	D	L	GF	GA	GD	Pts	Qualification or relegation
1	Dinamo Zagreb (C)	36	26	7	3	67	19	+48	85	Qualification for the Champions League second qualifying round (Note: Dinamo Zagreb qualified for the Europa League third qualifying round by winning the 2015–16 Croatian Football Cup. However, since they already qualified for European competition based on their league position, the spot awarded to the cup winners was passed down the league.)
2	Rijeka	36	21	14	1	56	20	+36	77	Qualification for the Europa League third qualifying round
3	Hajduk Split	36	17	10	9	46	28	+18	61	Qualification for the Europa League second qualifying round
4	Lokomotiva	36	16	4	16	56	53	+3	52	Qualification for the Europa League first qualifying round
5	Inter Zaprešić	36	11	14	11	39	48	−9	47	

Source: PrvaHNL.hr, Soccerway
Rules for classification: 1) Points; 2) Head-to-head points; 3) Head-to-head goal difference; 4) Head-to-head goals scored (at home if two teams tied); 5) Goal difference; 6) Goals scored; 7) Play-off
(Note: Criteria 2–4 and 7 is only used if deciding Champion, teams to international competition or teams for relegation and in that case criteria 6 will not be used).
(C) Champions

==== Results summary ====
Overall								Home						Away					
Pld	W	D	L	GF	GA	GD	Pts	W	D	L	GF	GA	GD	W	D	L	GF	GA	GD
36	26	7	3	67	19	+48	85	16	2	0	41	9	+32	10	5	3	26	10	+16

Last updated: 14 May 2016.
Source: Competitive matches

==== Results by round ====
Round	1	2	3	4	5	6	7	8	9	10	11	12	13	14	15	16	17	18	19	20	21	22	23	24	25	26	27	28	29	30	31	32	33	34	35	36
Ground	H	A	H	A	H	H	A	H	A	A	H	A	H	A	A	H	A	H	H	A	H	A	H	H	A	H	H	A	H	A	H	A	A	H	A	A
Result	D	D	W	W	D	W	D	W	W	D	W	D	W	L	L	W	W	W	W	W	W	W	W	W	W	W	W	L	W	W	W	D	W	W	W	W
Position	4	6	3	1	2	1	1	1	1	1	1	1	1	3	3	2	2	2	1	1	1	1	1	1	1	1	1	1	1	1	1	1	1	1	1	1

Updated to match(es) played on 14 May 2016. Source: Competitive matches
A = Away; H = Home; W = Win; D = Draw; L = Loss

==== Matches ====
12 July 2015 1	Dinamo Zagreb	1–1	Hajduk Split	Zagreb
19:00 CEST (UTC+02:00)	Taravel (yellow card) 14'; Soudani 37'; Rog (yellow card) 88'; Pinto (yellow card) 89'	Report	Caktaš 8' (yellow card) 56'; Ohandza (yellow card) 31'	Stadium: Stadion Maksimir; Attendance: 23,631; Referee: Bruno Marić (Daruvar)

19 July 2015 2	Osijek	1–1	Dinamo Zagreb	Osijek
19:00 CEST (UTC+02:00)	Radotić 11'; Kurtović (yellow card) 32'; Maslać (yellow card) 58'; Matas (yellow card) 61'	Report	Soudani 15'; Ademi (yellow card) 50'; Mățel (yellow card) 81'; Fernandes (yellow card) 83'	Stadium: Stadion Gradski vrt Attendance: 4,616; Referee: Igor Križarić (Čakovec)

25 July 2015 3	Dinamo Zagreb	5–1	Inter Zaprešić	Zagreb
19:00 CEST (UTC+02:00)	Hodžić 8', 59', 61'; Fernandes 39' (pen.), 56'; Musa (yellow card) 59'	Report	Šoljić (yellow card) 17'; Nestorovski (yellow card) 38' (goal) 51'; Komorski (red card) 39'	Stadium: Stadion Maksimir; Attendance: 1,207; Referee: Tihomir Pejin (Donji Miholjac)

31 July 2015 4	NK Zagreb	0–2	Dinamo Zagreb	Zagreb
21:00 CEST (UTC+02:00)	Musa (yellow card) 45'	Report	Hodžić 13', 63'; Ademi (yellow card) 52'	Stadium: Stadion Kranjčevićeva; Attendance: 2,500; Referee: Bruno Marić (Daruvar)

8 August 2015 5	Dinamo Zagreb	0–0	Rijeka	Zagreb
21:00 CEST (UTC+02:00)	Taravel (yellow card) 67'	Report	Maleš (yellow card) 4'; Balaj (yellow card) 15'; Sharbini (yellow card) 39'; Ristovski (yellow card) 40'; Leovac (yellow card) 77'; Bezjak (red card) 82'	Stadium: Stadion Maksimir; Attendance: 5,200; Referee: Mario Zebec (Cestica)

15 August 2015 6	Dinamo Zagreb	3–0	RNK Split	Zagreb
21:00 CEST (UTC+02:00)	Soudani 28'; Machado 46'; Gonçalo (yellow card) 63'; Henríquez (yellow card) 66' (goal) 89'; Fernandes (yellow card) 83'	Report	Blagojević (yellow card) 10'; Zagorac (yellow card) 50'	Stadium: Stadion Maksimir; Attendance: 2,000; Referee: Ivan Bebek (Rijeka)

22 August 2015 7	Istra 1961	1–1	Dinamo Zagreb	Pula
21:00 CEST (UTC+02:00)	Hadžić (yellow card) 14'; Zlomislić 20'; Heister (yellow card) 28'; Kasalica (yellow card) 84'	Report	Ćorić 34'; Henríquez (yellow card) 52'; Benković (yellow card) 64'	Stadium: Stadion Aldo Drosina; Attendance: 3,385; Referee: Bruno Marić (Daruvar)

29 August 2015 8	Dinamo Zagreb	3–0	Slaven Belupo	Zagreb
21:00 CEST (UTC+02:00)	Paracki 11' (o.g.); Antolić (yellow card) 35'; Henríquez 44'; Mățel 79'	Report	Gregurina (yellow card) 60'	Stadium: Stadion Maksimir; Attendance: 1,386; Referee: Jurica Mihalj (Velika Mlaka)

11 September 2015 9	Lokomotiva	0–4	Dinamo Zagreb	Zagreb
18:00 CEST (UTC+02:00)		Report	Henríquez 36', 64'; Fernandes 70'; Sigali 74'	Stadium: Stadion Kranjčevićeva; Attendance: 1,853; Referee: Željko Frković (Gospić)

19 September 2015 10	Hajduk Split	0–0	Dinamo Zagreb	Split
17:00 CEST (UTC+02:00)	Sušić (yellow card) 32'; Velázquez (red card) 90+3'	Report	Rog (yellow card) 18'; Soudani (yellow card) 87'; Henríquez (penalty missed) 90+3'	Stadium: Stadion Poljud; Attendance: 17,939; Referee: Bruno Marić (Daruvar)

25 September 2015 11	Dinamo Zagreb	4–1	Osijek	Zagreb
18:00 CEST (UTC+02:00)	Hodžić 11', 40'; Henríquez 17' (yellow card) 72'; Machado (yellow card) 63'; Musa 78'	Report	Mikulić (yellow card) 17'; Grgić (yellow card) 50' (goal) 83'	Stadium: Stadion Maksimir; Attendance: 526; Referee: Jurica Mihalj (Velika Mlaka)

3 October 2015 12	Inter Zaprešić	2–2	Dinamo Zagreb	Zaprešić
19:00 CEST (UTC+02:00)	Čabraja 6'; Mlinar (yellow card) 22'; Nestorovski 38' (yellow card) 63'; Čeliković (yellow card) 45+1'; Begić (yellow card) 78'; Mazalović (yellow card) 79'; Posavec (yellow card) 88'	Report	Soudani (yellow card) 45'; Fernandes 45+1' (pen.); Hodžić 49' (yellow card) 90+2'; Gonçalo (yellow card) 56'; Musa (yellow card) 78'	Stadium: Stadion ŠRC Zaprešić; Attendance: 1,800; Referee: Goran Gabrilo (Split)

16 October 2015 13	Dinamo Zagreb	4–1	NK Zagreb	Zagreb
18:00 CEST (UTC+02:00)	Fernandes 17', 35'; Hodžić 56'; Henríquez 69'	Report	Boban 1'	Stadium: Stadion Maksimir; Attendance: 721; Referee: Marijo Strahonja (Zaprešić)

25 October 2015 14	Rijeka	2–1	Dinamo Zagreb	Rijeka
15:00 CET (UTC+01:00)	Samardžić (yellow card) 3' (goal) 50'; Bezjak (yellow card) 30'; Vešović (yellow card) 34'; Moisés (yellow card) 36'; Maleš (yellow card) 87'; Sharbini 90+1' (yellow card) 90+1'	Report	Fernandes 6'; Mățel (yellow card) 32'; Taravel (red card) 34'; Antolić (yellow card) 41'	Stadium: Stadion Rujevica; Attendance: 5,474; Referee: Marko Matoc (Zaprešić)

30 October 2015 15	RNK Split	1–0	Dinamo Zagreb	Split
18:00 CET (UTC+01:00)	Blagojević (yellow card) 30'; Franjić 38'; Majstorović (yellow card) 76'; Bagarić (yellow card) 79'; Rrahmani (yellow card) 90+2'	Report	Gonçalo (yellow card) 57'	Stadium: Stadion Park Mladeži; Attendance: 1,500; Referee: Ivan Bebek (Rijeka)

8 November 2015 16	Dinamo Zagreb	1–0	Istra 1961	Zagreb
15:00 CET (UTC+01:00)	Fernandes 81' (yellow card) 90+2'; Ježina (yellow card) 90+2'	Report	Gojković (yellow card) 30'; Zolotić (yellow card) 87'; Nikolić (yellow card) 90+2'; Vuković (yellow card) 90+2'	Stadium: Stadion Maksimir; Attendance: 1,232; Referee: Tihomir Pejin (Donji Miholjac)

20 November 2015 17	Slaven Belupo	1–2	Dinamo Zagreb	Koprivnica
18:00 CET (UTC+01:00)	Delić 39'; Križman (yellow card) 48'	Report	Taravel 43' (yellow card) 88'; Henríquez 55'; Gonçalo (yellow card) 76'	Stadium: Gradski stadion Attendance: 1,715; Referee: Ante Vučemilović-Šimunović (Osijek)

29 November 2015 18	Dinamo Zagreb	3–1	Lokomotiva	Zagreb
15:00 CET (UTC+01:00)	Rog 5', 72'; Ćorić 79'	Report	Grezda 41'; Doležal (yellow card) 59'; Mrčela (yellow card) 69'	Stadium: Stadion Maksimir; Attendance: 829; Referee: Fran Jović (Zagreb)

5 December 2015 19	Dinamo Zagreb	2–1	Hajduk Split	Zagreb
15:00 CET (UTC+01:00)	Fernandes 5'; Soudani 90+5' (yellow card) 90+5'	Report	Caktaš 17'; Tudor (yellow card) 25'; Sušić (yellow card) 52'; Milić (yellow card) 53'; Jefferson (yellow card) 63' (yellow-red card) 90'; Bencun (yellow card) 90'	Stadium: Stadion Maksimir; Attendance: 10,328; Referee: Ante Vučemilović-Šimunović (Osijek)

13 December 2015 20	Osijek	0–1	Dinamo Zagreb	Osijek
15:00 CET (UTC+01:00)	Arsenić (yellow card) 10'; Kurtović (yellow card) 51'; Lukić (yellow card) 70'; Matas (yellow card) 78'	Report	Pjaca 41'; Henríquez (yellow card) 59'	Stadium: Stadion Gradski vrt Attendance: 1,677; Referee: Mario Zebec (Cestica)

19 December 2015 21	Dinamo Zagreb	1–0	Inter Zaprešić	Zagreb
15:00 CET (UTC+01:00)	Rog (yellow card) 67'; Soudani 86'	Report	Bočkaj (yellow card) 24'; Čeliković (yellow card) 55'; Čović (yellow card) 76'	Stadium: Stadion Maksimir; Attendance: 888; Referee: Tihomir Pejin (Donji Miholjac)

14 February 2016 22	NK Zagreb	1–2	Dinamo Zagreb	Zagreb
17:00 CET (UTC+01:00)	Medić 30' (yellow card) 42'; Bevab (yellow card) 43'; Kolinger (yellow card) 43'; Stepčić (yellow card) 53'; Šulc (yellow card) 69'; B. Boban (yellow card) 72'	Report	Fernandes 63'; Hodžić 67' (pen.); Stojanović (yellow card) 78'	Stadium: Stadion Kranjčevićeva; Attendance: 1,500; Referee: Dalibor Mlakar (Zagreb)

21 February 2016 23	Dinamo Zagreb	3–0	Rijeka	Zagreb
17:00 CET (UTC+01:00)	Soudani 64', 90+2'; Sigali (yellow card) 51' (goal) 83'; Schildenfeld (yellow card) 85'	Report	Gavranović (yellow card) 27'; Maleš (yellow card) 45'; Brezovec (yellow card) 57'; Bezjak (yellow card) 67'	Stadium: Stadion Maksimir; Attendance: 10,075; Referee: Ante Vučemilović-Šimunović (Osijek)

28 February 2016 24	Dinamo Zagreb	1–0	RNK Split	Zagreb
15:00 CET (UTC+01:00)	Pjaca 63'; Sigali (yellow card) 76'	Report	Franjić (yellow card) 11'; Miljković (yellow card) 31'; Blagojević (yellow card) 33'; Vitus (yellow card) 43'	Stadium: Stadion Maksimir; Attendance: 2,745; Referee: Andrej Burilo (Osijek)

3 March 2016 25	Istra 1961	0–1	Dinamo Zagreb	Pula
18:00 CET (UTC+01:00)	Tomić (yellow card) 18'; Vuković (yellow card) 20'; Heister (yellow card) 35'; Hadžić (yellow card) 41'	Report	Pjaca 6'; Taravel (yellow card) 78'; Stojanović (yellow card) 79'; Machado (yellow card) 85'; Sigali (yellow card) 86'; Antolić (yellow card) 90+1'	Stadium: Stadion Aldo Drosina; Attendance: 856; Referee: Mario Zebec (Cestica)

6 March 2016 26	Dinamo Zagreb	2–1	Slaven Belupo	Zagreb
15:00 CET (UTC+01:00))	Ćorić 2'; Hodžić 58'; Stojanović (yellow card) 65'; Fernandes (yellow card) 80'	Report	Križman (yellow card) 30' (goal) 32'; Ozobić (yellow card) 75'	Stadium: Stadion Maksimir; Attendance: 1,400; Referee: Goran Gabrilo (Split)

13 March 2016 27	Dinamo Zagreb	3–2	Lokomotiva	Zagreb
15:00 CET (UTC+01:00))	Pjaca 19', 31'; Ćorić 90+3'	Report	Çekiçi 53'; Fiolić 56'	Stadium: Stadion Maksimir; Attendance: 1,137; Referee: Željko Frković (Gospić)

20 March 2016 28	Hajduk Split	1–0	Dinamo Zagreb	Split
15:00 CET (UTC+01:00)	Tudor 4'; Bašić (yellow card) 76'	Report	Hodžić (yellow card) 87'	Stadium: Stadion Poljud; Attendance: 12,726; Referee: Ante Vučemilović-Šimunović (Osijek)

3 April 2016 29	Dinamo Zagreb	3–0	Osijek	Zagreb
15:00 CEST (UTC+02:00)	Machado (yellow card) 25'; Taravel 36' (yellow card) 79'; Fernandes (penalty missed) 42' 90+2'; Henríquez 65' (yellow card) 66'	Report	Vojnović (yellow card) 35'; Škorić (yellow card) 42'	Stadium: Stadion Maksimir; Attendance: 2,238; Referee: Igor Križarić (Čakovec)

10 April 2016 30	Inter Zaprešić	0–1	Dinamo Zagreb	Zaprešić
15:00 CEST (UTC+02:00)	Begić (yellow card) 31'; Zulim (yellow card) 46'	Report	Soudani 41'; Rog (yellow card) 73'; Mățel (yellow card) 90'	Stadium: Stadion ŠRC Zaprešić; Attendance: 1,795; Referee: Andrej Burilo (Osijek)

16 April 2016 31	Dinamo Zagreb	1–0	NK Zagreb	Zagreb
19:00 CEST (UTC+02:00)	Taravel 39' (pen.)	Report	Šulc (yellow card) 32'; Musa (yellow card) 82'	Stadium: Stadion Maksimir; Attendance: 1,435; Referee: Igor Pajač (Sveti Ivan Zelina)

19 April 2016 32	Rijeka	0–0	Dinamo Zagreb	Rijeka
20:00 CEST (UTC+02:00)		Report	Sigali (yellow card) 75'	Stadium: Stadion Rujevica; Attendance: 5,685; Referee: Bruno Marić (Daruvar)

23 April 2016 33	RNK Split	0–1	Dinamo Zagreb	Split
19:00 CEST (UTC+02:00)	Grubišić (yellow card) 19'; Jakić (yellow card) 58'; Vitus (yellow card) 66'; Pešić (yellow card) 79'; Miljković (yellow card) 90'	Report	Sigali (yellow card) 10'; Pjaca 36'; Machado (yellow card) 45'; Soudani (yellow card) 76'	Stadium: Stadion Park Mladeži; Attendance: 700; Referee: Mario Zebec (Cestica)

30 April 2016 34	Dinamo Zagreb	1–0	Istra 1961	Zagreb
19:00 CEST (UTC+02:00)	Pjaca 22'	Report		Stadium: Stadion Maksimir; Attendance: 1,400; Referee: Tihomir Pejin (Donji Miholjac)

6 May 2016 35	Slaven Belupo	0–3	Dinamo Zagreb	Koprivnica
18:00 CEST (UTC+02:00)	Križman (yellow card) 52'	Report	Pjaca 35'; Sigali 44'; Hodžić 90+1'	Stadium: Gradski stadion Attendance: 1,510; Referee: Mario Zebec (Cestica)

14 May 2016 36	Lokomotiva	0–4	Dinamo Zagreb	Zagreb
19:00 CEST (UTC+02:00)	Grezda (yellow card) 70'	Report	Rog 23'; Hodžić 29'; Gojak 47'; Fernandes 56'; Moro (yellow card) 79'	Stadium: Stadion Maksimir; Attendance: 1,395; Referee: Igor Pajač (Sveti Ivan Zelina)

Source: Croatian Football Federation

=== Croatian Cup ===
22 September 2015 R1	Oštrc Zlatar	1–7	Dinamo Zagreb	Zlatar
15:30 CEST (UTC+02:00)	Trčak 44' (yellow card) 84'; Puklin (yellow card) 63'	Report	Machado 27'; Morris 50'; Çekiçi 56', 69'; Hodžić 57'; Olmo 64'; Mățel 82'	Stadium: NK Oštrc; Attendance: 2,500; Referee: Jurica Mihalj (Velika Mlaka)

27 October 2015 R2	Mladost Ždralovi	1–3	Dinamo Zagreb	Ždralovi
14:00 CET (UTC+01:00)	Ivančić (yellow card) 19'; Starčević 38'; Sučić (yellow card) 56'; Sabljić (yellow card) 83'	Report	Pavičić (yellow card) 32'; Mamić (yellow card) 35'; Hodžić 62'; Henríquez 70'; Soudani 87'	Stadium: NK Mladost; Attendance: 1,500; Referee: Ivan Bebek (Rijeka)

10 February 2016 QF	Inter Zaprešić	0–1	Dinamo Zagreb	Zaprešić
17:00 CET (UTC+01:00)	Bočkaj (yellow card) 54'; Nestorovski (yellow card) 55'; Komorski (yellow card) 65'	Report	Hodžić 10'; Schildenfeld (yellow card) 88'	Stadium: Stadion ŠRC Zaprešić; Attendance: 741; Referee: Ante Vučemilović-Šimunović (Osijek)

16 March 2016 SF	Hajduk Split	0–2	Dinamo Zagreb	Split
17:30 CET (UTC+01:00)	Sušić (yellow card) 45'; Vélez (yellow card) 50'; Šimić (yellow card) 54'; Vlašić (yellow card) 77'; Milić (yellow card) 90'	Report	Soudani 23'; Ćorić 29'; Rog (yellow card) 61'; Fernandes (yellow card) 81'	Stadium: Stadion Poljud; Attendance: 12,973; Referee: Damir Batinić (Osijek)

6 April 2016 SF	Dinamo Zagreb	4–0 (6–0 agg.)	Hajduk Split	Zagreb
17:30 CEST (UTC+02:00)	Brekalo 2'; Musa (yellow card) 17'; Fernandes 24', 50'; Soudani 67'	Report	Nižić (yellow card) 17'; Jefferson (yellow card) 34'; Pejić (yellow card) 79'; Sušić (yellow card) 86'	Stadium: Stadion Maksimir; Attendance: 7,923; Referee: Ivan Bebek (Rijeka)

10 May 2016 Final	Dinamo Zagreb	2–1	Slaven Belupo	Osijek
18:00 CEST (UTC+02:00)	Pjaca 31' (pen.); Sosa (yellow card) 55'; Machado (yellow card) 65'; Rog 77' (yellow card) 78'	Report	Edson (yellow card) 30'; Ejupi 61'; Ozobić (yellow card) 75'	Stadium: Stadion Gradski vrt Attendance: 2,282; Referee: Ante Vučemilović-Šimunović (Osijek)

Source: Croatian Football Federation

=== UEFA Champions League ===
==== Qualifying round ====
15 July 2015 QR2	Dinamo Zagreb (Croatia)	1–1	(Luxembourg) Fola Esch	Zagreb, Croatia
21:00 CEST (UTC+02:00)	Gonçalo (yellow card) 35'; Henríquez 36'; Machado (yellow card) 49'; Šimunović (yellow card) 58'; Soudani (yellow card) 82'; Pivarić (yellow card) 90+2'	Report	Hadji 25'; Martino (yellow card) 34'; Ronny (red card) 64'; Françoise (yellow card) 64'; Kirch (yellow card) 69'	Stadium: Maksimir; Attendance: 9,100; Referee: Neil Doyle (Ireland)

22 July 2015 QR2	Fola Esch (Luxembourg)	0–3 (1–4 agg.)	(Croatia) Dinamo Zagreb	Esch-sur-Alzette, Luxembourg
20:00 CEST (UTC+02:00)		Report	Pjaca 29', 40'; Taravel (yellow card) 65'; Rog 75'	Stadium: Stade Josy Barthel; Attendance: 3,300; Referee: Sergey Tsinkevich (Belarus)

28 July 2015 QR3	Dinamo Zagreb (Croatia)	1–1	(Norway) Molde	Zagreb, Croatia
21:00 CEST (UTC+02:00)	Henríquez 18' (yellow card) 84'; Machado (red card) 65'; Rog (yellow card) 80'	Report	Kamara 21'; Hussain (yellow card) 52'; Rindarøy (yellow card) 55'; Hestad (yellow card) 62'	Stadium: Maksimir; Attendance: 9,327; Referee: Serge Gumienny (Belgium)

4 August 2015 QR3	Molde (Norway)	3–3 (4–4(a) agg.)	(Croatia) Dinamo Zagreb	Molde, Norway
19:00 CEST (UTC+02:00)	Kamara (penalty missed) 8'; Hussain 43' (yellow card) 87'; Forren (red card) 72'; Singh (penalty missed) 45+2'; Elyounoussi 52' (pen.); Kamara 75'	Report	Pjaca 17'; Ademi 20'; Rog 22'; Gonçalo (yellow card) 31'; Eduardo (yellow card) 51'; Antolić (yellow card) 80'; Hodžić (yellow card) 87'; Pinto (yellow card) 90+5'	Stadium: Aker Stadion; Attendance: 7,017; Referee: Michael Oliver (England)

19 August 2015 Playoff	Skënderbeu (Albania)	1–2	(Croatia) Dinamo Zagreb	Elbasan, Albania
20:45 CEST (UTC+02:00)	Shkëmbi 37'; Vangjeli (yellow card) 48'	Report	Machado (yellow card) 36'; Pjaca (yellow card) 44'; Soudani 66'; Pivarić 90+3'	Stadium: Elbasan Arena; Attendance: 12,163; Referee: Sergei Karasev (Russia)

25 August 2015 Playoff	Dinamo Zagreb (Croatia)	4–1 (6–2 agg.)	(Albania) Skënderbeu	Zagreb, Croatia
20:45 CEST (UTC+02:00)	Soudani 9', 80'; Hodžić 15'; Gonçalo (red card) 48'; Ćorić (yellow card) 22'; Pivarić (yellow card) 27'; Taravel 55'	Report	Esquerdinha 10'; Berisha (yellow card) 17'; Vangjeli (yellow card) 57'	Stadium: Maksimir; Attendance: 16,888; Referee: Gianluca Rocchi (Italy)

==== Group stage ====
Pos	Team	Pld	W	D	L	GF	GA	GD	Pts	Qualification	BAY	ARS	OLY	DZG
1	(Germany) Bayern Munich	6	5	0	1	19	3	+16	15	Advance to knockout phase	—	5–1	4–0	5–0
2	(England) Arsenal	6	3	0	3	12	10	+2	9	Advance to knockout phase	2–0	—	2–3	3–0
3	(Greece) Olympiacos	6	3	0	3	6	13	−7	9	Transfer to Europa League	0–3	0–3	—	2–1
4	(Croatia) Dinamo Zagreb	6	1	0	5	3	14	−11	3		0–2	2–1	0–1	—

Source: UEFA
Rules for classification: Group stage tiebreakers

Win Draw Loss Upcoming fixture

16 September 2015 1	Dinamo Zagreb (Croatia)	2–1	(England) Arsenal	Zagreb, Croatia
20:45 CEST (UTC+02:00)	Pivarić 24'; Antolić (yellow card) 47'; Fernandes 58'; Pinto (yellow card) 65'; Rog (yellow card) 90'	Report	Giroud (red card) 40'; Walcott 79'; Campbell (yellow card) 87'	Stadium: Maksimir; Attendance: 17,840; Referee: Ovidiu Haţegan (Romania)

29 September 2015 2	Bayern Munich (Germany)	5–0	(Croatia) Dinamo Zagreb	Munich, Germany
20:45 CEST (UTC+02:00)	Douglas Costa 13'; Lewandowski 21', 28', 55'; Boateng (yellow card) 21'; Götze 25'	Report	Pivarić (yellow card) 66'; Ademi (yellow card) 81'	Stadium: Allianz Arena; Attendance: 70,000; Referee: Aleksei Kulbakov (Belarus)

20 October 2015 3	Dinamo Zagreb (Croatia)	0–1	(Greece) Olympiacos	Zagreb, Croatia
20:45 CEST (UTC+02:00)	Taravel (yellow card) 41'; Soudani (yellow card) 80'	Report	Elabdellaoui (yellow card) 76'; Ideye 79'; Siovas (yellow card) 81'	Stadium: Maksimir; Attendance: 13,678; Referee: Paolo Tagliavento (Italy)

4 November 2015 4	Olympiacos (Greece)	2–1	(Croatia) Dinamo Zagreb	Athens, Greece
20:45 CEST (UTC+02:00)	Fortounis (penalty missed) 54'; Pardo 65', 90'	Report	Rog (yellow card) 13'; Hodžić 21'; Gonçalo (yellow card) 53'; Machado (yellow card) 69'; Pivarić (red card) 79'	Stadium: Karaiskakis; Attendance: 31,473; Referee: Antonio Mateu Lahoz (Spain)

24 November 2015 5	Arsenal (England)	3–0	(Croatia) Dinamo Zagreb	London, England
20:45 CEST (UTC+02:00)	Özil 29'; Sánchez 33', 69'; Monreal (yellow card) 65'	Report		Stadium: Emirates; Attendance: 58,978; Referee: Viktor Kassai (Hungary)

9 December 2015 6	Dinamo Zagreb (Croatia)	0–2	(Germany) Bayern Munich	Zagreb, Croatia
20:45 CEST (UTC+02:00)	Gonçalo (yellow card) 31'; Pivarić (yellow card) 74'; Eduardo (yellow card) 87'	Report	Lewandowski 61', 64'; Müller (penalty missed) 87'	Stadium: Maksimir; Attendance: 19,681; Referee: Martin Strömbergsson (Sweden)

== Player seasonal records ==
Updated 14 May 2016. Competitive matches only.

=== Goals ===
Rank	Name	League	Europe	Cup	Total
1	(Bosnia and Herzegovina) Armin Hodžić	13	2	3	18
2	(Chile) Junior Fernandes	12	1	2	15
3	(Algeria) El Arbi Hillel Soudani	8	3	3	14
4	(Croatia) Marko Pjaca	8	3	1	12
5	(Chile) Ángelo Henríquez	8	2	1	11
6	(Croatia) Marko Rog	3	2	1	6
7	(Croatia) Ante Ćorić	4	–	1	5
8	(France) Jérémy Taravel	3	1	–	4
9	(Argentina) Leonardo Sigali	3	–	–	3
10	(Portugal) Paulo Machado	1	–	1	2
10	(Romania) Alexandru Mățel	1	–	1	2
10	(Croatia) Josip Pivarić	–	2	–	2
10	(Albania) Endri Çekiçi	–	–	2	2
14	(Bosnia and Herzegovina) Amer Gojak	1	–	–	1
14	(Croatia) Mario Musa	1	–	–	1
14	(North Macedonia) Arijan Ademi	–	1	–	1
14	(Croatia) Josip Brekalo	–	–	1	1
14	(Croatia) Darick Kobie Morris	–	–	1	1
14	(Spain) Dani Olmo	–	–	1	1
14	Own goals	1	–	–	1
	TOTALS	67	17	19	103

Source: Competitive matches
