= 2016–17 GNK Dinamo Zagreb season =

GNK Dinamo Zagreb
2016–17 season
- Chairman: Mirko Barišić
- Manager: Ivaylo Petev
- Stadium: Maksimir Stadium
- Prva HNL: 2nd
- Croatian Cup: Runners-up
- UEFA Champions League: Group stage
- Top goalscorer: League: El Arbi Hillel Soudani (17); All: Armin Hodžić (21)
- Highest home attendance: 23,875 vs Juventus
- Lowest home attendance: 1,014 vs Istra 1961
- Average home league attendance: 4,482
Home colours	Away colours

The 2016–17 season is Dinamo Zagreb's 26th season in the Croatian First Division and 105th year in existence as a football club.

This season was an extremely unsuccessful one for the club, losing both the league title and cup title to rivals HNK Rijeka and also failing to score a single goal in the 2016–17 UEFA Champions League group stage, in all six matches they played.

== Squad ==
As of 16 February 2017

Note: Flags indicate national team as defined under FIFA eligibility rules; some limited exceptions apply. Players may hold more than one non-FIFA nationality.

No.	Pos.	Nation	Player
1	GK	CRO	Danijel Zagorac
2	FW	ALG	El Arabi Hillel Soudani
6	DF	CRO	Vinko Soldo
7	MF	CRO	Mario Šitum
8	MF	CRO	Domagoj Antolić (Captain)
9	FW	CHI	Ángelo Henríquez
10	MF	POR	Paulo Machado
13	MF	POR	Gonçalo
14	MF	BIH	Amer Gojak
15	FW	BIH	Armin Hodžić
16	MF	MKD	Arijan Ademi
18	MF	CRO	Domagoj Pavičić
19	DF	CRO	Josip Pivarić
20	MF	CRO	Sammir (Vice-captain)
21	MF	ESP	Dani Olmo

No.	Pos.	Nation	Player
22	DF	ARG	Leonardo Sigali
23	DF	CRO	Gordon Schildenfeld
24	MF	CRO	Ante Ćorić
25	MF	CRO	Bojan Knežević
26	DF	CRO	Filip Benković
27	MF	CRO	Nikola Moro
29	MF	CRO	Ivan Fiolić
31	DF	CRO	Marko Lešković
33	GK	CRO	Marko Mikulić
35	DF	CRO	Borna Sosa
37	DF	SVN	Petar Stojanović
40	GK	CRO	Dominik Livaković
55	DF	CRO	Dino Perić (on loan from NK Lokomotiva)
77	DF	ROU	Alexandru Mățel
95	MF	BRA	Marcos Guilherme

== Competitions ==
=== Overview ===
Competition	Record							
Competition	Pld	W	D	L	GF	GA	GD	Win %
Prva HNL	36	27	5	4	68	24	+44	75.00
Cup	6	4	1	1	15	4	+11	66.67
Champions League	12	5	1	6	11	20	−9	41.67
Total	54	36	7	11	94	48	+46	66.67

Last updated: 31 May 2017
Source: Competitions

== Competitions ==
=== MAXtv Prva Liga ===
==== League table ====
Pos	Team	Pld	W	D	L	GF	GA	GD	Pts	Qualification or relegation
1	Rijeka (C)	36	27	7	2	71	23	+48	88	Qualification to Champions League second qualifying round
2	Dinamo Zagreb	36	27	5	4	68	24	+44	86	Qualification to Europa League third qualifying round (Note: Since winners of 2016–17 Croatian Football Cup, Rijeka, qualified for Champions League, the spot awarded to the cup winner (Europa League third qualifying round) was passed to the runners-up and all other spots were adjusted accordingly.)
3	Hajduk Split	36	20	9	7	70	31	+39	69	Qualification to Europa League second qualifying round
4	Osijek	36	20	6	10	52	37	+15	66	Qualification to Europa League first qualifying round
5	Lokomotiva	36	12	8	16	41	38	+3	44	

Source: Prva HNL (in Croatian), Soccerway
Rules for classification: 1) Points; 2) Head-to-head points; 3) Head-to-head goal difference; 4) Head-to-head goals scored (away goals if tied); 5) Goal difference; 6) Goals scored; 7) Play-off
(Note: Criteria 2-4 and 7 is only used if deciding Champion, teams to international competition or teams for relegation and in that case criteria 6 will not be used).
(C) Champions

==== Results summary ====
Overall								Home						Away					
Pld	W	D	L	GF	GA	GD	Pts	W	D	L	GF	GA	GD	W	D	L	GF	GA	GD
36	27	5	4	68	24	+44	86	12	4	2	37	13	+24	15	1	2	31	11	+20

Last updated: 27 May 2017.
Source: Competitive matches

==== Results by round ====
Round	1	2	3	4	5	6	7	8	9	10	11	12	13	14	15	16	17	18	19	20	21	22	23	24	25	26	27	28	29	30	31	32	33	34	35	36
Ground	H	A	H	A	H	H	A	H	A	A	H	A	H	A	A	H	A	H	H	A	H	A	H	H	A	H	A	A	H	A	H	A	A	H	A	H
Result	W	W	D	W	W	W	W	L	L	W	D	W	W	W	W	D	W	D	W	W	W	W	W	W	W	W	D	W	L	L	W	W	W	W	W	W
Position	2	1	2	1	1	2	2	2	3	3	3	2	2	2	2	2	2	2	2	2	2	2	2	2	2	2	2	2	2	2	2	2	2	2	2	2

Updated to match(es) played on 27 May 2017. Source: Competitive matches
A = Away; H = Home; W = Win; D = Draw; L = Loss

==== Matches ====
17 July 2016 1	Dinamo Zagreb	3–1	Lokomotiva	Zagreb
	Soudani 29'; Hodžić 45', 54'	Report	Fiolić 16'	Stadium: Stadion Maksimir; Attendance: 2,103; Referee: Igor Pajač (Sveti Ivan Zelina)

29 July 2016 3	Dinamo Zagreb	1–1	Slaven Belupo	Zagreb
	Benković 90+4'	Report	Jovičić 90+3'	Stadium: Stadion Maksimir; Attendance: 1,323; Referee: Marko Matoc (Zaprešić)

6 August 2016 4	Cibalia	0–2	Dinamo Zagreb	Vinkovci
		Report	Soudani 18'; Vitaić 41' (o.g.)	Stadium: Stadion HNK Cibalia; Attendance: 3,264; Referee: Igor Križarić (Čakovec)

10 August 2016 2	Hajduk Split	0–4	Dinamo Zagreb	Split
		Report	Rog 45+1', 60'; Fernándes 57', 68'	Stadium: Stadion Poljud; Attendance: 29,109; Referee: Mario Zebec (Cestica)

13 August 2016 5	Dinamo Zagreb	2–1	Inter Zaprešić	Zagreb
	Soudani 38'; Fernándes 82'	Report	Blažević 90+1'	Stadium: Stadion Maksimir; Attendance: 1,691; Referee: Bruno Marić (Daruvar)

19 August 2016 6	Dinamo Zagreb	1–0	RNK Split	Zagreb
	Antolić 62'	Report		Stadium: Stadion Maksimir; Attendance: 1,424; Referee: Tihomir Pejin (Donji Miholjac)

28 August 2016 7	Istra 1961	1–2	Dinamo Zagreb	Pula
	Ljubanović 88'	Report	Ćorić 2'; Soudani 49'	Stadium: Stadion Aldo Drosina; Attendance: 2,012; Referee: Ivan Bebek (Rijeka)

10 September 2016 8	Dinamo Zagreb	0–1	Osijek	Zagreb
		Report	Knežević 2'	Stadium: Stadion Maksimir; Attendance: 3,012; Referee: Mario Zebec (Cestica)

18 September 2016 9	Rijeka	5–2	Dinamo Zagreb	Rijeka
	Gavranović 1'; Gorgon 33', 55'; Vešović 49', 83'	Report	Soudani 82'; Pavičić 86'	Stadium: Stadion Rujevica; Attendance: 5,589; Referee: Ante Vučemilović-Šimunović (Osijek)

23 September 2016 10	Lokomotiva	0–1	Dinamo Zagreb	Zagreb
		Report	Benković 82'	Stadium: Stadion Kranjčevićeva; Attendance: 1,989; Referee: Fran Jović (Zagreb)

2 October 2016 11	Dinamo Zagreb	0–0	Hajduk Split	Zagreb
		Report		Stadium: Stadion Maksimir; Attendance: 11,500; Referee: Ivan Bebek (Rijeka)

14 October 2016 12	Slaven Belupo	0–1	Dinamo Zagreb	Koprivnica
		Report	Fernándes 79'	Stadium: Gradski stadion Attendance: 1,990; Referee: Duje Strukan (Split)

22 October 2016 13	Dinamo Zagreb	3–0	Cibalia	Zagreb
	Soudani 33'; Henríquez 42'; Šitum 76'	Report		Stadium: Stadion Maksimir; Attendance: 2,156; Referee: Željko Frković (Gospić)

29 October 2016 14	Inter Zaprešić	0–1	Dinamo Zagreb	Zaprešić
		Report	Ćorić 9'	Stadium: Stadion ŠRC Zaprešić; Attendance: 2,465; Referee: Tihomir Pejin (Donji Miholjac)

6 November 2016 15	RNK Split	0–1	Dinamo Zagreb	Split
		Report	Stojanović 17'	Stadium: Stadion Park Mladeži; Attendance: 756; Referee: Ante Vučemilović-Šimunović (Osijek)

18 November 2016 16	Dinamo Zagreb	1–1	Istra 1961	Zagreb
	Fernándes 44' (pen.)	Report	Roce 45+1' (pen.)	Stadium: Stadion Maksimir; Attendance: 1,014; Referee: Željko Frković (Gospić)

27 November 2016 17	Osijek	0–2	Dinamo Zagreb	Osijek
		Report	Ćorić 45+1'; Soudani 48'	Stadium: Stadion Gradski vrt Attendance: 3,902; Referee: Marko Matoc (Zaprešić)

3 December 2016 18	Dinamo Zagreb	1–1	Rijeka	Zagreb
	Sigali 77'	Report	Gorgon 51'	Stadium: Stadion Maksimir; Attendance: 8,319; Referee: Ante Vučemilović-Šimunović (Osijek)

11 December 2016 19	Dinamo Zagreb	3–1	Lokomotiva	Zagreb
	Soudani 63', 89'; Fiolić 81'	Report	Antunović 75'	Stadium: Stadion Maksimir; Attendance: 1,271; Referee: Fran Jović (Zagreb)

17 December 2016 20	Hajduk Split	0–1	Dinamo Zagreb	Split
		Report	Soudani 90+2'	Stadium: Stadion Poljud; Attendance: 14,031; Referee: Mario Zebec (Cestica)

18 February 2017 21	Dinamo Zagreb	1–0	Slaven Belupo	Zagreb
	Hodžić 42'	Report		Stadium: Stadion Maksimir; Attendance: 3,646; Referee: Tihomin Pejin (Donji Miholjac)

26 February 2017 22	Cibalia	1–2	Dinamo Zagreb	Vinkovci
	Zgrablić 87'	Report	Hodžić 72', 90' (pen.)	Stadium: Stadion HNK Cibalia; Attendance: 4,462; Referee: Damir Batinić (Osijek)

4 March 2017 23	Dinamo Zagreb	2–0	Inter Zaprešić	Zagreb
	Pivarić 43'; Hodžić 89'	Report		Stadium: Stadion Maksimir; Attendance: 3,523; Referee: Mario Zebec (Cestica)

11 March 2017 24	Dinamo Zagreb	4–0	RNK Split	Zagreb
15:00	Hodžić 21', 61'; Sammir 35'; Ćorić 70'	Report		Stadium: Stadion Maksimir; Attendance: 2,774; Referee: Igor Pajač (Sveti Ivan Zelina)

19 March 2017 25	Istra 1961	0–3	Dinamo Zagreb	Pula
		Report	Soudani 18'; Hodžić 52', 90+2'	Stadium: Stadion Aldo Drosina; Attendance: 2,814; Referee: Ivan Bebek (Rijeka)

1 April 2017 26	Dinamo Zagreb	2–1	Osijek	Zagreb
	Pavičić 49'; Lešković 84'	Report	Barać 17'	Stadium: Stadion Maksimir; Attendance: 5,116; Referee: Igor Pajač (Sveti Ivan Zelina)

8 April 2017 27	Rijeka	1–1	Dinamo Zagreb	Rijeka
19:00	Andrijašević 68'	Report	Soudani 86'	Stadium: Stadion Rujevica; Attendance: 6,004; Referee: Mario Zebec (Cestica)

14 April 2017 28	Lokomotiva	1–2	Dinamo Zagreb	Zagreb
20:00	Grezda 5'	Report	Hodžić 29' (pen.), 67' (pen.)	Stadium: Stadion Kranjčevićeva; Attendance: 887; Referee: Tihomir Pejin (Donji Miholjac)

22 April 2017 29	Dinamo Zagreb	0–2	Hajduk Split	Zagreb
		Report	Erceg 29'; Futács 90'	Stadium: Stadion Maksimir; Attendance: 13,392; Referee: Ante Vučemilović-Šimunović (Osijek)

25 April 2017 30	Slaven Belupo	2–1	Dinamo Zagreb	Koprivnica
	Héber 43'; Bogojević 90+2'	Report	Moro 78'	Stadium: Gradski stadion Attendance: 1,613; Referee: Igor Pajač (Sveti Ivan Zelina)

29 April 2017 31	Dinamo Zagreb	6–0	Cibalia	Zagreb
	Gojak 23', 38', 78', 86'; Soudani 27'; Antolić 42'	Report		Stadium: Stadion Maksimir; Attendance: 2,428; Referee: Marko Matoc (Zaprešić)

4 May 2017 32	Inter Zaprešić	0–3	Dinamo Zagreb	Zaprešić
		Report	Hodžić 17'; Soudani 29'; Antolić 58'	Stadium: Stadion ŠRC Zaprešić; Attendance: 981; Referee: Bruno Marić (Daruvar)

12 May 2017 33	RNK Split	0–1	Dinamo Zagreb	Split
		Report	Hodžić 55'	Stadium: Stadion Park Mladeži; Attendance: 600; Referee: Igor Križarić (Čakovec)

17 May 2017 34	Dinamo Zagreb	2–1	Istra 1961	Zagreb
	Antolić 14'; Hodžić 27'	Report	Prelčec 83'	Stadium: Stadion Maksimir; Attendance: 2,528; Referee: Tihomir Pejin (Donji Miholjac)

21 May 2017 35	Osijek	0–1	Dinamo Zagreb	Osijek
		Report	Sigali 64'	Stadium: Stadion Gradski vrt Attendance: 4,254; Referee: Ivan Bebek (Rijeka)

27 May 2017 36	Dinamo Zagreb	5–2	Rijeka	Zagreb
19:00 CEST (UTC+02:00)	Soudani 4', 33', 44' (yellow card) 77'; Pivarić (yellow card) 6'; Olmo 47' (yellow card) 60'; Hodžić 51'	Report	Maleš (yellow card) 36'; Vešović 45+1'; Bradarić (yellow card) 54'; Andrijašević (penalty missed) 62' (yellow card) 75' (goal) 83'	Stadium: Maksimir; Attendance: 13,456; Referee: Mario Zebec (Cestica)

=== Croatian Cup ===
20 September 2016 R1	Veli Vrh	0–5	Dinamo Zagreb	Pula
		Report	Morris 26'; Henríquez 49'; Olmo 59', 79'; Hodžić 85'	Stadium: Tivoli; Attendance: 1,700; Referee: Ivan Bebek (Rijeka)

25 October 2016 R2	Bjelovar	1–2	Dinamo Zagreb	Bjelovar
	Jaković 80'	Report	Šitum 14'; Ćorić 70'	Stadium: Gradski stadion Attendance: 1,300; Referee: Igor Križarić (Čakovec)

30 November 2016 QF	Inter Zaprešić	0–1	Dinamo Zagreb	Zaprešić
		Report	Perić 67'	Stadium: Stadion ŠRC Zaprešić; Attendance: 895; Referee: Ante Vučemilović-Šimunović (Osijek)

1 March 2017 SF	Dinamo Zagreb	6–0	RNK Split	Zagreb
	Ćorić 26', 78'; Hodžić 37', 51', 66', 81' (pen.)	Report		Stadium: Stadion Maksimir; Attendance: 1,623; Referee: Igor Križarić (Čakovec)

14 March 2017 SF	RNK Split	0–0 (0–6 agg.)	Dinamo Zagreb	Split
		Report		Stadium: Stadion Park Mladeži; Attendance: 695; Referee: Marko Matoc (Zaprešić)

31 May 2017 Final	Dinamo Zagreb	1–3	Rijeka	Varaždin
20:15 CEST (UTC+02:00)	Pivarić (yellow card) 30'; Olmo 37'; Hodžić (yellow card) 43'; Henríquez (yellow card) 79'	Report	Gavranović 24', 46'; Vešović (yellow card) 28'; Elez (yellow card) 36'; Ristovski (yellow card) 39'; Andrijašević (yellow card) 51'; Župarić 73'; Bradarić (yellow card) 89'	Stadium: Varteks; Attendance: 8,183; Referee: Ante Vučemilović-Šimunović (Osijek)

=== UEFA Champions League ===
==== Matches ====
Date	Venue	Opponents	Score	Dinamo Zagreb scorer(s)	Report
2016–17 Champions League - Second qualifying round
12 July 2016	Philip II Arena, Skopje	(North Macedonia) Vardar	2–1	Mijušković (o.g.), Rog	UEFA.com
20 July 2016	Stadion Maksimir, Zagreb	(North Macedonia) Vardar	3–2	Pjaca (2), Machado	UEFA.com
2016–17 Champions League - Third qualifying round
26 July 2016	Stadion Maksimir, Zagreb	(Georgia (country)) Dinamo Tbilisi	2–0	Soudani, Ćorić	UEFA.com
2 August 2016	Boris Paichadze Dinamo Arena, Tbilisi	(Georgia (country)) Dinamo Tbilisi	1–0	Rog	UEFA.com
2016–17 Champions League - Play-off round
16 August 2016	Stadion Maksimir, Zagreb	(Austria) Red Bull Salzburg	1–1	Rog	UEFA.com
24 August 2016	Red Bull Arena, Wals-Siezenheim	(Austria) Red Bull Salzburg	2–1 (a.e.t.)	Fernandes, Soudani	UEFA.com
2016–17 Champions League - Group stage
14 September 2016	Parc Olympique Lyonnais, Décines-Charpieu	(France) Lyon	0–3		
27 September 2016	Stadion Maksimir, Zagreb	(Italy) Juventus	0–4		
18 October 2016	Stadion Maksimir, Zagreb	(Spain) Sevilla	0–1		
2 November 2016	Ramón Sánchez Pizjuán Stadium, Seville	(Spain) Sevilla	0–4		
22 November 2016	Stadion Maksimir, Zagreb	(France) Lyon	0–1		
7 December 2016	Juventus Stadium, Turin	(Italy) Juventus	0–2		

== Player seasonal records ==
Updated 31 May 2017. Competitive matches only.

=== Goals ===
Rank	Name	League	Europe	Cup	Total
1	(Bosnia and Herzegovina) Armin Hodžić	16	–	5	21
2	(Algeria) El Arbi Hillel Soudani	17	2	–	19
3	(Croatia) Ante Ćorić	4	1	3	8
4	(Chile) Junior Fernándes	5	1	–	6
5	(Croatia) Marko Rog	2	3	–	5
6	(Croatia) Domagoj Antolić	4	–	–	4
6	(Bosnia and Herzegovina) Amer Gojak	4	–	–	4
6	(Spain) Dani Olmo	1	–	3	4
9	(Croatia) Filip Benković	2	–	–	2
9	(Croatia) Domagoj Pavičić	2	–	–	2
9	(Argentina) Leonardo Sigali	2	–	–	2
9	(Chile) Ángelo Henríquez	1	–	1	2
9	(Croatia) Mario Šitum	1	–	1	2
9	(Croatia) Marko Pjaca	–	2	–	2
15	(Croatia) Ivan Fiolić	1	–	–	1
15	(Croatia) Marko Lešković	1	–	–	1
15	(Croatia) Nikola Moro	1	–	–	1
15	(Croatia) Josip Pivarić	1	–	–	1
15	(Croatia) Sammir	1	–	–	1
15	(Slovenia) Petar Stojanović	1	–	–	1
15	(Portugal) Paulo Machado	–	1	–	1
15	(Croatia) Darick Kobie Morris	–	–	1	1
15	(Croatia) Dino Perić	–	–	1	1
Own goals		1	1	–	2
	TOTALS	68	11	15	94

Source: Competitive matches
