= 2016 Croatian Football Cup final =

- Event: 2015–16 Croatian Cup
Dinamo Zagreb	Slaven Belupo
2	1
- Date: 10 May 2016
- Venue: Stadion Gradski vrt, Osijek
- Referee: Ante Vučemilović-Šimunović (Osijek)
- Attendance: 2,282

The 2016 Croatian Cup final was a one-legged affair played between Dinamo Zagreb and Slaven Belupo. The final was played in Osijek on 10 May 2016.

== Road to the final ==
Dinamo Zagreb		Round	Slaven Belupo	
Opponent	Result		Opponent	Result
bye		Preliminary round	bye	
Oštrc Zlatar	7–1	First round	Tehničar 1974	3–0
Mladost Ždralovi	3−1	Second round	Šibenik	2–0
Inter Zaprešić	1–0	Quarter-finals	Osijek	1–1 (4–1 p)
Hajduk Split	2–0	Semi-finals	Rijeka	1–2
Hajduk Split	4–0	Semi-finals	Rijeka	3–0

== Match details ==
10 May 2016
18:00

Dinamo Zagreb	2–1	Slaven Belupo
Pjaca 31' (pen.); Rog 77'	Report	Ejupi 61'

Stadion Gradski vrt, Osijek
Attendance: 2,282
Referee: Ante Vučemilović-Šimunović (Osijek)

Dinamo Zagreb	Slaven Belupo

DINAMO ZAGREB:
GK	1	(Croatia) Antonijo Ježina
FW	2	(Algeria) El Arbi Hillel Soudani		(substituted off) 72'
MF	8	(Croatia) Domagoj Antolić (c)
MF	10	(Portugal) Paulo Machado	(yellow card) 65'	(substituted off) 72'
FW	20	(Croatia) Marko Pjaca
DF	22	(Argentina) Leonardo Sigali
DF	23	(Croatia) Gordon Schildenfeld
MF	24	(Croatia) Ante Ćorić		(substituted off) 88'
MF	30	(Croatia) Marko Rog	(yellow card) 78'
DF	35	(Croatia) Borna Sosa	(yellow card) 55'
DF	77	(Romania) Alexandru Mățel
Substitutes:
GK	34	(Portugal) Eduardo Carvalho
DF	3	(Croatia) Mario Musa
MF	4	(Bosnia and Herzegovina) (Croatia) Damir Šovšić
FW	9	(Chile) Ángelo Henríquez		(substituted on) 88'
FW	11	(Chile) Junior Fernándes		(substituted on) 72'
FW	15	(Bosnia and Herzegovina) Armin Hodžić		(substituted on) 72'
DF	26	(Croatia) Filip Benković
Manager:
(Croatia) Zoran Mamić

SLAVEN BELUPO:
GK	1	(Slovenia) Matjaž Rozman
DF	5	(Brazil) Edson	(yellow card) 30'
MF	14	(Croatia) Mateas Delić (c)		(substituted off) 69'
FW	9	(North Macedonia) Muzafer Ejupi
MF	10	(Croatia) Nikola Pokrivač
DF	16	(Croatia) Vedran Purić
MF	21	(Bosnia and Herzegovina) Goran Zakarić
DF	24	(Croatia) Dino Štiglec
DF	26	(Croatia) Božo Musa
FW	30	(Croatia) Filip Ozobić	(yellow card) 75'
MF	8	(Denmark) Søren Christensen
Substitutes:
GK	12	(Croatia) Antun Marković
DF	4	(Croatia) Vinko Međimorec
MF	7	(Austria) Stefan Savić
MF	13	(Croatia) David Arap
FW	15	(Croatia) Sandi Križman		(substituted on) 69'
DF	18	(Croatia) Gordan Barić
MF	20	(Croatia) Mario Gregurina
Manager:
(Croatia) Željko Kopić

Assistant referees:
Dalibor Conjar (Osijek)
Hrvoje Barišić (Osijek)
Fourth official:
Goran Pataki (Đakovo)
Additional assistant referees:

Match rules

- 90 minutes.
- 30 minutes of extra-time if necessary.
- Penalty shoot-out if scores still level.
- Seven named substitutes.
- Maximum of three substitutions.
