= Josip Pivarić =

Croatian footballer (born 1989)

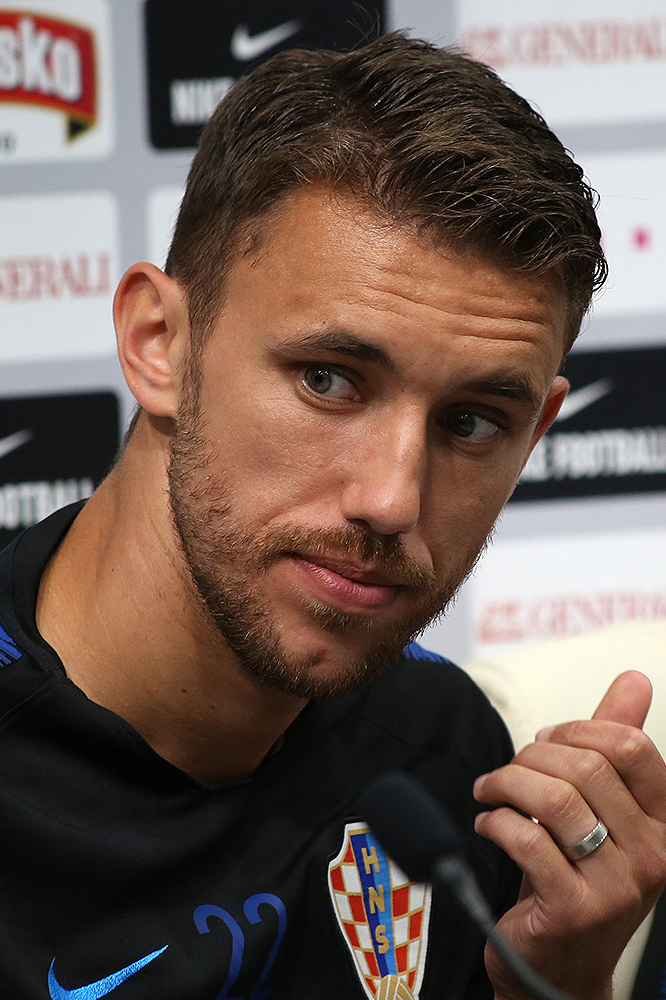
- Pivarić in 2018

Personal information
- Full name: Josip Pivarić
- Date of birth: 30 January 1989 (age 37)
- Place of birth: Zagreb, SR Croatia, Yugoslavia
- Height: 1.76 m (5 ft 9 in)
- Position: Left-back

Youth career
- 1999–2008: Dinamo Zagreb

Senior career*
| Years | Team | Apps | (Gls) |
| 2008–2017 | Dinamo Zagreb | 115 | (8) |
| 2008–2012 | → Lokomotiva Zagreb (loan) | 67 | (1) |
| 2017–2020 | Dynamo Kyiv | 29 | (0) |
| 2020–2023 | Lokomotiva Zagreb | 79 | (11) |

International career
| 2005 | Croatia U16 | 1 | (0) |
| 2005 | Croatia U17 | 11 | (2) |
| 2005–2007 | Croatia U18 | 8 | (0) |
| 2007–2008 | Croatia U19 | 8 | (0) |
| 2008 | Croatia U20 | 1 | (0) |
| 2013–2018 | Croatia | 26 | (0) |
Medal record
Men's football
Representing Croatia
FIFA World Cup
| Runner-up | 2018 Russia |
- * Club domestic league appearances and goals

Josip Pivarić (Croatian pronunciation: [jǒsip pǐʋaritɕ]; born 30 January 1989) is a Croatian former professional footballer who played as a left-back.

== Club career ==
=== Dinamo Zagreb ===
Pivarić joined the Dinamo Zagreb youth academy at a young age. He was promoted to the first team during the spring of 2008. He went out on loan to Dinamo feeder club Lokomotiva Zagreb that same year, making 13 appearances in his first season with the Lokosi. In January 2009, he signed a seven-and-a-half-year contract with Dinamo Zagreb, spending until the end of the 2011–12 season on loan at Lokomotiva.

In January 2012, Pivarić rejoined the senior squad at Dinamo. He made his senior debut for Dinamo on 25 February 2012, in a 0–3 win over Karlovac. His first goal for the Modri came in a 1–1 draw with Rijeka on 21 April 2012.

Pivarić scored a historic goal for Dinamo in September 2015, the opening goal in a famous 2–1 victory over Arsenal in the 2015–16 UEFA Champions League.

In a friendly match against Norwegian side Strømsgodset in January 2016, Pivarić sustained extensive ligament damage to his knee, forcing him out for the remainder of the 2015–16 season and missing out on probable UEFA Euro 2016 national team selection. Pivarić made his return on 6 July 2016, in a 1–0 pre-season friendly victory over Copenhagen.

=== Dynamo Kyiv ===
On 8 August 2017, Pivarić signed a three-year contract with Ukrainian club Dynamo Kyiv.

=== Lokomotiva Zagreb ===
On 1 October 2020, Pivarić returned club Lokomotiva Zagreb as a free transfer.

=== Retirement ===
On 1 July 2023, Pivarić announced his retirement from football aged 34.

== International career ==
Pivarić made his international debut for the Croatia national football team on 14 August 2013, in a 3–2 win over Liechtenstein in Vaduz.

In May 2018 he was named in Croatia's preliminary 32 man squad for the 2018 World Cup in Russia. Throughout the tournament Ivan Strinić, Croatia's first choice left back, was battling injuries mostly due to his team playing three consecutive extra time matches to get to the final. This allowed Pivarić a great deal of playtime in Croatia's run to the 2018 World Cup Final. He earned a total of 26 caps, scoring no goals. His final international was an October 2018 friendly against Jordan.

== Career statistics ==
=== Club ===
As of the match played on 1 July 2023

| Club | Season | League | | | National cup | | Continental | | Other | | Total | |
| Club | Season | Division | Apps | Goals | Apps | Goals | Apps | Goals | Apps | Goals | Apps | Goals |
|---|---|---|---|---|---|---|---|---|---|---|---|---|
| Lokomotiva Zagreb (loan) | 2008–09 | Druga HNL | 13 | 1 | — | | — | | — | | 13 | 1 |
| Lokomotiva Zagreb (loan) | 2009–10 | Prva HNL | 9 | 0 | — | | — | | — | | 9 | 0 |
| Lokomotiva Zagreb (loan) | 2010–11 | Prva HNL | 29 | 0 | — | | — | | — | | 29 | 0 |
| Lokomotiva Zagreb (loan) | 2011–12 | Prva HNL | 16 | 0 | — | | — | | — | | 16 | 0 |
| Lokomotiva Zagreb (loan) | Total | | 67 | 1 | — | | — | | — | | 67 | 1 |
| Dinamo Zagreb | 2011–12 | Prva HNL | 10 | 3 | 5 | 0 | — | | — | | 15 | 3 |
| Dinamo Zagreb | 2012–13 | Prva HNL | 28 | 3 | 1 | 0 | 11 (Note: Appearance(s) in the UEFA Champions League) | 0 | — | | 40 | 3 |
| Dinamo Zagreb | 2013–14 | Prva HNL | 22 | 1 | 5 | 0 | 8 (Note: Five appearances in the UEFA Champions League, three appearances in the UEFA Europa League) | 0 | — | | 35 | 1 |
| Dinamo Zagreb | 2014–15 | Prva HNL | 16 | 0 | 4 | 0 | 9 (Note: Two appearances in the UEFA Champions League, seven appearances in the UEFA Europa League) | 0 | 1 (Note: Appearance in the Croatian Super Cup) | 0 | 30 | 0 |
| Dinamo Zagreb | 2015–16 | Prva HNL | 15 | 0 | — | | 11 | 2 | — | | 26 | 2 |
| Dinamo Zagreb | 2016–17 | Prva HNL | 24 | 1 | 3 | 0 | 8 | 0 | — | | 35 | 1 |
| Dinamo Zagreb | Total | | 115 | 8 | 18 | 0 | 47 | 2 | 1 | 0 | 181 | 10 |
| Dynamo Kyiv | 2017–18 | Ukrainian Premier League | 21 | 0 | 3 | 0 | 8 (Note: Appearance(s) in the UEFA Europa League) | 0 | — | | 32 | 0 |
| Dynamo Kyiv | 2018–19 | Ukrainian Premier League | 6 | 0 | 1 | 0 | 5 (Note: Three appearances in the UEFA Champions League, two appearances in the UEFA Europa League) | 0 | — | | 12 | 0 |
| Dynamo Kyiv | 2019–20 | Ukrainian Premier League | 2 | 0 | 1 | 0 | 0 | 0 | — | | 3 | 0 |
| Dynamo Kyiv | Total | | 29 | 0 | 5 | 0 | 13 | 0 | — | | 47 | 0 |
| Lokomotiva Zagreb | 2020-21 | Prva HNL | 23 | 6 | 1 | 1 | — | | — | | 24 | 7 |
| Lokomotiva Zagreb | 2021-22 | Prva HNL | 28 | 3 | 3 | 2 | — | | — | | 31 | 5 |
| Lokomotiva Zagreb | 2022-23 | Prva HNL | 28 | 2 | 2 | 0 | — | | — | | 30 | 2 |
| Lokomotiva Zagreb | Total | | 79 | 11 | 6 | 3 | — | | — | | 85 | 14 |
| Career total | | | 290 | 20 | 29 | 3 | 60 | 2 | 1 | 0 | 380 | 25 |

=== International ===
As of 15 October 2018

Croatia
| Year | Apps | Goals |
|---|---|---|
| 2013 | 2 | 0 |
| 2014 | 0 | 0 |
| 2015 | 3 | 0 |
| 2016 | 4 | 0 |
| 2017 | 9 | 0 |
| 2018 | 8 | 0 |
| Total | 26 | 0 |

== Honours ==
Dinamo Zagreb

- HNL: 2011–12, 2012–13, 2013–14, 2014-15, 2015-16
- Croatian Cup: 2011-12, 2014-15, 2015-16
- Croatian Super Cup: 2013

Dynamo Kyiv

- Ukrainian Cup: 2019-20
- Ukrainian Super Cup: 2019

Croatia

- FIFA World Cup runner-up: 2018

Orders

- Order of Duke Branimir: 2018
