= Alexandru Mățel =

Romanian footballer

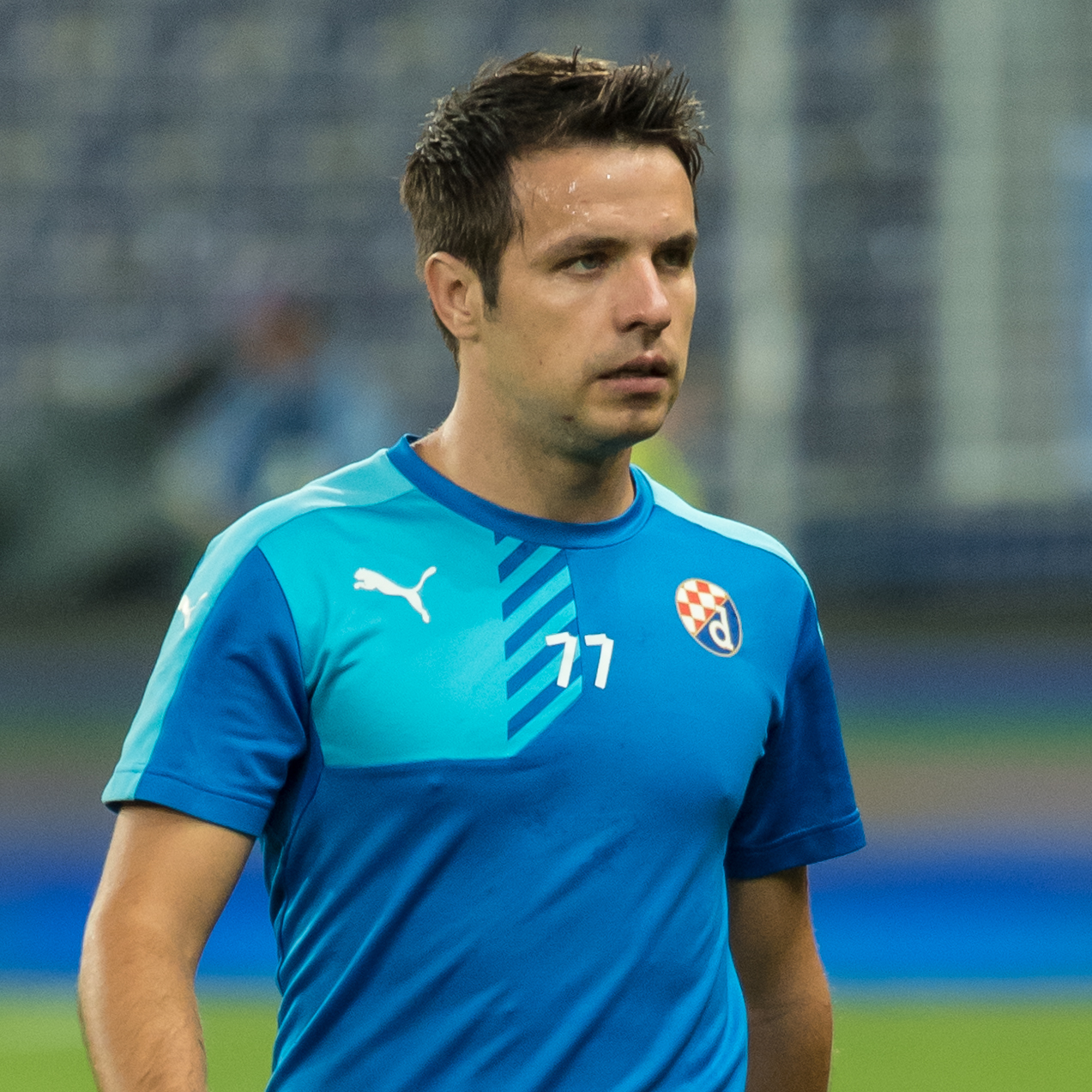
- Mățel training for Dinamo Zagreb in 2016

Personal information
- Date of birth: 17 October 1989 (age 37)
- Place of birth: Constanța, Romania
- Height: 1.77 m (5 ft 10 in)
- Position: Right-back

Team information
- Current team: Farul Constanța (scouting director)

Youth career
- 1996–1999: ITC Constanța
- 1999–2007: Farul Constanța

Senior career*
Years	Team	Apps	(Gls)
2006–2010	Farul Constanța	46	(2)
2007–2008	→ Delta Tulcea (loan)	42	(1)
2010–2015	Astra Giurgiu	84	(6)
2015–2019	Dinamo Zagreb	55	(1)
2019	Hermannstadt	24	(0)
2019–2020	Universitatea Craiova	5	(0)
2021	Hermannstadt	22	(1)
2022	Atletic United Ploiești	1	(0)
Total		278	(11)

International career
2009–2010	Romania U21	6	(0)
2011–2016	Romania	17	(0)

Managerial career
- 2022: Atletic United Ploiești (player/assistant)
- 2022–2024: Farul Constanța (team manager)
- 2024–: Farul Constanța (scouting director)
- * Club domestic league appearances and goals

Alexandru Mățel (born 17 October 1989) is a Romanian former professional footballer who played mainly as a right-back and currently scouting director at Liga I club Farul Constanța.

== Club career ==
=== Early career and Astra ===
Mățel began his career at Farul Constanța, and after a loan spell for Delta Tulcea he joined Astra Giurgiu, with which he recorded his European competitions debut. He won Cupa României and Supercupa României with Astra, before signing with Croatian champions Dinamo Zagreb

=== Dinamo Zagreb ===
In January 2015, Mățel signed a 4 1/2-year contract with Croatian champions Dinamo Zagreb. He made his debut for the club on 7 February 2015 in a 2–1 victory against Lokomotiva Zagreb and played 13 matches in the 2014–15 season as Dinamo secured both the league title and the cup.

=== FC Hermannstadt ===
On 9 February 2019 Mățel signed a contract with Liga I side FC Hermannstadt.

=== Universitatea Craiova ===
On 2 September 2019 Mățel signed a contract with Liga I side Universitatea Craiova for one year with an option for another two years.

== International career ==
On 2 September 2011, Mățel made his senior debut for Romania in a UEFA Euro 2012 qualification match against Luxembourg, playing the full 90 minutes. He was selected in the nation's UEFA Euro 2016 squad.

== Career statistics ==
=== Club ===
Appearances and goals by club, season and competition
Club	Season	League			National cup (Note: Includes Cupa României, Croatian Cup)		Continental		Other		Total	
Club	Season	Division	Apps	Goals	Apps	Goals	Apps	Goals	Apps	Goals	Apps	Goals
Farul Constanța	2005–06	Divizia A	1	0	–		–		–		1	0
Farul Constanța	2006–07	Liga I	0	0	0	0	0	0	–		0	0
Farul Constanța	2008–09	Liga I	16	0	–		–		–		16	0
Farul Constanța	2009–10	Liga II	29	2	1	0	–		–		30	2
Farul Constanța	Total		46	2	1	0	0	0	0	0	47	2
Delta Tulcea (loan)	2007–08	Liga II	27	0	0	0	–		–		1	0
Delta Tulcea (loan)	2008–09	Liga II	15	1	0	0	–		–		0	0
Delta Tulcea (loan)	Total		42	1	0	0	0	0	0	0	47	2
Astra Giurgiu	2010–11	Liga I	28	4	1	0	–		–		29	4
Astra Giurgiu	2011–12	Liga I	6	0	0	0	–		–		6	0
Astra Giurgiu	2012–13	Liga I	21	0	3	0	–		–		24	0
Astra Giurgiu	2014–15	Liga I	29	2	6	0	7 (Note: Appearances in UEFA Europa League)	0	–		42	2
Astra Giurgiu	2014–15	Liga I	0	0	0	0	0	0	0	0	0	0
Astra Giurgiu	Total		84	6	10	0	7	0	0	0	101	6
Dinamo Zagreb	2014–15	1. HNL	13	0	1	0	–		–		14	0
Dinamo Zagreb	2015–16	1. HNL	21	1	5	1	6 (Note: Appearances in UEFA Champions League)	0	–		32	2
Dinamo Zagreb	2016–17	1. HNL	18	0	2	0	7	0	–		27	0
Dinamo Zagreb	2017–18	1. HNL	3	0	0	0	0	0	–		3	0
Dinamo Zagreb	2018–19	1. HNL	0	0	0	0	0	0	–		0	0
Dinamo Zagreb	Total		55	1	8	1	13	0	0	0	76	2
Hermannstadt	2018–19	Liga I	16	0	0	0	–		2 (Note: Appearances in Liga I promotion/relegation play-offs)	0	18	0
Hermannstadt	2019–20	Liga I	8	0	–		–		–		8	0
Hermannstadt	Total		24	0	0	0	0	0	2	0	26	0
Universitatea Craiova	2019–20	Liga I	5	0	1	0	–		–		6	0
Hermannstadt	2020–21	Liga I	22	1	–		–		1	0	23	1
Hermannstadt	2021–22	Liga I	0	0	0	0	–		–		0	0
Hermannstadt	Total		22	1	0	0	0	0	1	0	23	1
Atletic United Ploiești	2022–23	Liga IV	1	0	–		–		–		1	0
Career total			279	11	20	1	20	0	3	0	322	12

=== International ===
Appearances and goals by national team and year
National team	Year	Apps	Goals
Romania	2011	2	0
Romania	2012	2	0
Romania	2013	8	0
Romania	2014	1	0
Romania	2015	1	0
Romania	2016	3	0
Total		17	0

== Honours ==
Astra Giurgiu

- Cupa României: 2013–14
- Supercupa României: 2014

Dinamo Zagreb

- 1. HNL: 2014–15, 2015–16, 2017–18
- Croatian Cup: 2014–15, 2015–16, 2016–17, 2017–18
