= Filip Benković =

Croatian footballer (born 1997)

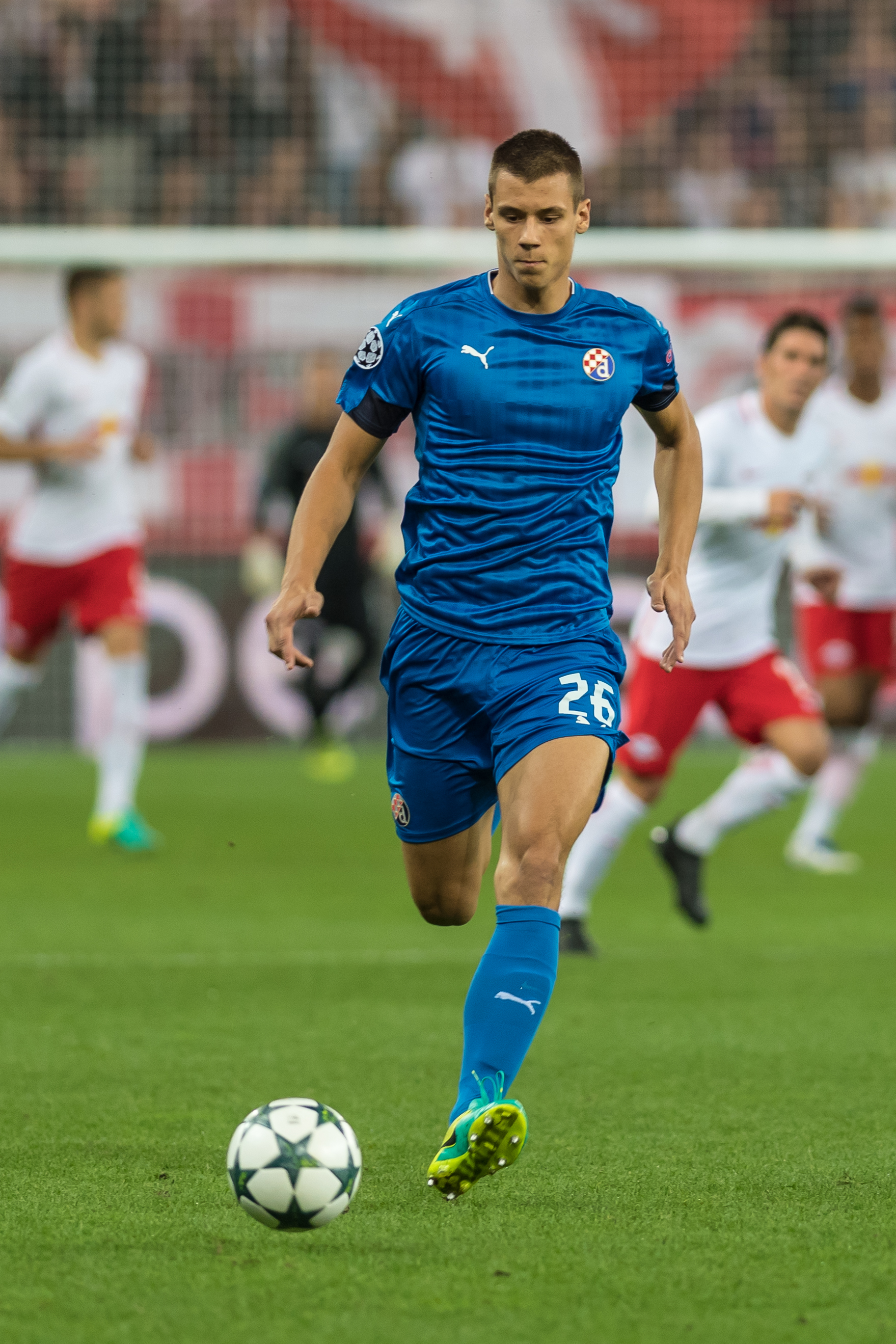
- Benković with Dinamo Zagreb in 2016

Personal information
- Full name: Filip Benković
- Date of birth: 13 July 1997 (age 29)
- Place of birth: Zagreb, Croatia
- Height: 1.94 m (6 ft 4 in)
- Position: Centre back

Team information
- Current team: Shenzhen Peng City
- Number: 32

Youth career
- 2008–2015: Dinamo Zagreb

Senior career*
Years	Team	Apps	(Gls)
2015–2018	Dinamo Zagreb	56	(6)
2018–2022	Leicester City	0	(0)
2018–2019	→ Celtic (loan)	20	(2)
2020	→ Bristol City (loan)	10	(2)
2020–2021	→ Cardiff City (loan)	1	(0)
2021	→ OH Leuven (loan)	0	(0)
2022–2024	Udinese	2	(0)
2022–2023	→ Eintracht Braunschweig (loan)	19	(0)
2023–2024	→ Trabzonspor (loan)	14	(2)
2025–2026	AIK	27	(1)
2026–	Shenzhen Peng City	9	(2)

International career^{‡}
2013	Croatia U17	2	(0)
2014	Croatia U19	2	(1)
2015–2019	Croatia U21	7	(2)
2019	Croatia	1	(0)
- * Club domestic league appearances and goals as of 6 May 2026 ‡ National team caps and goals as of 11 June 2019

Filip Benković (born 13 July 1997) is a Croatian professional footballer who plays as a centre back for Chinese Super League club Shenzhen Peng City.

== Early life ==
Benković was born in Zagreb, the capital of Croatia, and joined the Dinamo Zagreb academy in 2008.

== Club career ==
=== Dinamo Zagreb ===
==== 2015–16 season ====
On 19 July 2015, Benković made his debut for the club in a 1–1 draw with Osijek. On 22 July, Benković made his European debut in a 3–0 win over Fola Esch in the second leg of the third qualifying round of the UEFA Champions League; playing twelve minutes after coming off the bench as a substitute in the 78th minute. He went on to make a total of 18 competitive appearances for the club in the 2015–16 season.

==== 2016–17 season ====
On 29 July 2016, in the league match against Slaven Belupo, after Dinamo went 0–1 in the 92nd minute, Benković scored a last-minute equalizing goal in the 94th minute, to make it 1–1. On 10 August, Benković played the full 90 minutes in a 4–0 away win over Hajduk Split. On 23 September, Benković scored the winning goal in a 1–0 win over Lokomotiva. In the mid-phase of the 2016–17 season, Benković was reportedly suffering from injury which would force him to miss the majority of the season.

==== 2017–18 season ====
On 15 July 2017, Benković scored in a 2–0 win over Istra 1961. On 9 September, Benković scored in a 3–2 win over Rudeš. On 21 October, Benković scored in a 2–2 draw with Hajduk Split. On 4 May 2018, Benković scored a last-minute equalizing goal in a 2–2 draw with Slaven Belupo. On 23 May, Benković came on as a 90th-minute substitute in the Croatian Cup Final, as Dinamo won 1–0.

=== Leicester City ===
On 9 August 2018, Leicester City confirmed via their official website that Benković signed for the club on a five-year contract, for a fee in the region of £13m. He left the club after mutually agreeing to cancel the remaining term of his contract on 12 January 2022.

==== Loan to Celtic ====
On 31 August 2018, Benković joined Celtic on a season-long loan deal. On 14 September 2018, Benković made his debut in a 0–0 draw with St Mirren, playing 60 minutes. Benković scored his first goal for Celtic in a 5–0 victory over Heart of Midlothian on 3 November 2018.

==== Loan to Bristol City ====
Benković signed for Bristol City until the end of the season on 31 January 2020. He scored his first goal for Bristol City in a 3–2 win over Derby County on 12 February 2020.

==== Loan to Cardiff City ====
In October 2020, Benković joined Cardiff City on a one-year loan. On 6 January 2021, Benković was recalled by his parent club Leicester City, having only played one game for Cardiff City.

==== Loan to OH Leuven ====
Just a few days after being recalled from Cardiff City, Benković was announced by Oud-Heverlee Leuven, arriving on loan from Leicester City until the end of the season.

=== Udinese ===
Following his release from Leicester City the previous day, Benković was confirmed as a new signing for Udinese on 13 January 2022.

==== Loan to Eintracht Braunschweig ====
On 1 September 2022, Benković moved on loan to Eintracht Braunschweig in Germany.

==== Loan to Trabzonspor ====
On 10 July 2023, Benković was loaned to Turkish side Trabzonspor.

==== Release by Udinese ====
On 30 August 2024, his contract with Udinese was terminated by mutual consent.

== International career ==
Benković made his Croatia debut on 11 June 2019 in a friendly 2–1 loss to Tunisia, as a starter.

== Career statistics ==
As of match played 6 May 2026

Appearances and goals by club, season and competition
Club	Season	League			Cup		League cup		Continental		Other		Total	
Club	Season	Division	Apps	Goals	Apps	Goals	Apps	Goals	Apps	Goals	Apps	Goals	Apps	Goals
Dinamo Zagreb	2015–16	1. HNL	13	0	2	0	—		3	0	—		18	0
Dinamo Zagreb	2016–17	1. HNL	18	2	0	0	—		10	0	—		28	2
Dinamo Zagreb	2017–18	1. HNL	25	4	3	0	—		2	0	—		30	4
Dinamo Zagreb	Total		56	6	5	0	—		15	0	—		76	6
Leicester City	2018–19	Premier League	0	0	—		1	0	—		—		1	0
Leicester City	2019–20	Premier League	0	0	1	0	0	0	—		—		1	0
Leicester City	2021–22	Premier League	0	0	0	0	0	0	0	0	0	0	0	0
Leicester City	Total		0	0	1	0	1	0	0	0	0	0	2	0
Celtic (loan)	2018–19	Scottish Premiership	20	2	1	0	2	0	4	0	—		27	2
Bristol City (loan)	2019–20	Championship	10	2	—		—		—		—		10	2
Cardiff City (loan)	2020–21	Championship	1	0	—		0	0	—		—		1	0
OH Leuven (loan)	2020–21	Belgian First Division A	0	0	0	0	—		—		—		0	0
Udinese	2021–22	Serie A	2	0	0	0	—		—		—		2	0
Udinese	2022–23	Serie A	0	0	0	0	—		—		—		0	0
Udinese	Total		2	0	0	0	—		—		—		2	0
Eintracht Braunschweig (loan)	2022–23	2. Bundesliga	19	0	0	0	—		—		—		19	0
Trabzonspor (loan)	2023–24	Süper Lig	14	2	2	0	—		—		—		16	2
AIK	2025	Allsvenskan	27	1	4	1	—		4	0	—		35	1
Shenzhen Peng City	2026	Chinese Super League	9	2	0	0	—		—		—		9	2
Career total			158	15	13	1	3	0	23	0	0	0	197	16

== Honours ==
Dinamo Zagreb

- Prva HNL: 2015–16, 2017–18
- Croatian Cup: 2015–16, 2017–18

Celtic

- Scottish Premiership: 2018–19
- Scottish Cup: 2018–19
- Scottish League Cup: 2018–19

Leicester City

- FA Community Shield: 2021
