= Paulo Machado =

Portuguese footballer (born 1986)

Personal information
- Full name: Paulo Ricardo Ribeiro de Jesus Machado
- Date of birth: 31 March 1986 (age 40)
- Place of birth: Bairro do Cerco, Portugal
- Height: 1.74 m (5 ft 9 in)
- Position: Midfielder

Youth career
- 1995–2000: Cerco do Porto
- 2000–2004: Porto
- 2001–2002: → Padroense (loan)

Senior career*
Years	Team	Apps	(Gls)
2003–2005	Porto B	22	(2)
2004–2009	Porto	4	(0)
2005–2006	→ Estrela Amadora (loan)	25	(2)
2006–2007	→ União Leiria (loan)	26	(0)
2007–2008	→ Leixões (loan)	25	(2)
2008–2009	→ Saint-Étienne (loan)	35	(3)
2009–2012	Toulouse	89	(12)
2012–2014	Olympiacos	45	(5)
2014–2017	Dinamo Zagreb	74	(3)
2016–2017	Dinamo Zagreb II	5	(0)
2017–2018	Aves	23	(4)
2018–2020	Mumbai City	29	(3)
2020–2021	Leixões	15	(1)
2021	Leixões B	5	(1)
2022	Pedrouços	8	(2)
Total		430	(40)

International career
2005–2006	Portugal U20	9	(0)
2006–2008	Portugal U21	24	(6)
2009–2010	Portugal U23	2	(1)
2010–2013	Portugal	6	(0)
Medal record
Men's football
Representing Portugal
UEFA European U17 Championship
Winner	2003 Portugal
- * Club domestic league appearances and goals

Paulo Ricardo Ribeiro de Jesus Machado (born 31 March 1986) is a Portuguese former professional footballer who played as a central midfielder.

Brought up at Porto, he amassed Primeira Liga totals of 103 matches and eight goals over five seasons, in representation of as many clubs. He also competed in France, Greece, Croatia and India, winning the national championship twice each with Olympiacos and Dinamo Zagreb.

Machado won six caps for Portugal, making his first appearance in 2010.

== Club career ==
=== Porto ===
Born in the Porto neighbourhood of Bairro do Cerco, where he was surrounded by deviant behaviours from an early age, Machado joined FC Porto's youth system at the age of 14. He made his first-team debut in the sixth round of the Taça de Portugal on 21 January 2004, under José Mourinho; he came on as a substitute for Sérgio Conceição, who had just concluded the 4–0 win against U.D. Vilafranquense at the Estádio das Antas. In the summer of 2005 he signed an improved contract until 2010 along with teammate Bruno Vale, before both went on consecutive loans to C.F. Estrela da Amadora and U.D. Leiria.

Machado was loaned again in the following two years, first to Leixões S.C. and then to AS Saint-Étienne in the French Ligue 1. Alongside teammates Diogo Valente and Vieirinha, also loaned by Porto, he was instrumental as the Matosinhos side retained their Primeira Liga status at the season's close.

On 10 July 2008, Machado was loaned to the French club as part of the deal that brought Colombian Fredy Guarín to Porto. He adapted well, becoming an integral part of Saint-Étienne's campaign, scoring twice in his first 16 games – 12 as a starter – and only missing three league matches as they narrowly avoided relegation.

=== Toulouse and Olympiacos ===
On 2 July 2009, Toulouse FC signed Machado to a four-year deal. In August 2012, after three seasons in which he averaged 30 appearances and four goals, he joined Olympiacos F.C. in Greece for €2,700,000 on a three-year contract. He scored his first goal for his new team on 3 November, also providing an assist to Kostas Mitroglou in a 2–0 home victory over OFI Crete FC.

=== Dinamo Zagreb ===
Machado joined GNK Dinamo Zagreb on 4 June 2014, on a three-year contract for an undisclosed fee. He won a league and cup double in his first season, equalising in a 2–1 home defeat of HNK Rijeka in the semi-finals on 8 April, followed by the winning attempt in the penalty shootout at the end of the goalless final against RNK Split on 20 May.

On 28 July 2015, during a UEFA Champions League play-off round against Molde FK at Stadion Maksimir, club fans booed Machado as he walked off the pitch while being replaced after a poor performance. In return, he made several obscene gestures for which he received a straight red card, being subsequently suspended until further notice. Sharing teams with compatriots Eduardo and Gonçalo Santos, he won a second consecutive double, starting in the 2–1 cup final win over NK Slaven Belupo on 10 May.

=== Later years ===
On 2 September 2017, free agent Machado signed with recently promoted C.D. Aves until the end of the season. On 31 August 2018, he joined Indian Super League franchise Mumbai City FC; after suffering an injury in the second half of the match against Jamshedpur FC on 19 December 2019, he was ruled out for the rest of the campaign.

Machado returned to Leixões following 12 years away in September 2020. In his one season back at the Estádio do Mar, he played just under half the fixtures and scored an added-time winner as a late substitute against Académico de Viseu F.C. on 28 February.

In June 2021, Machado retired from playing. He went immediately into being assistant manager at his final club's under-23 team.

== International career ==
Machado was part of the Portugal under-21 team at the 2007 UEFA European Championship. Previously, he won the Under-17 European Championship in 2003.

On 30 September 2010, Machado was called up for the first time to the senior side by newly appointed coach Paulo Bento. He did not make his debut in either of the two UEFA Euro 2012 qualifiers that were scheduled, but later spoke of his smooth integration into the squad and his ambition to eventually earn a regular place in the national team. He made his debut on 17 November, coming on for Nani in the dying minutes of a 4–0 friendly victory against Spain, in Lisbon.

== Career statistics ==
=== Club ===
As of match played on 19 December 2019

Club	Season	League			Cup		Continental		Total	
Club	Season	Division	Apps	Goals	Apps	Goals	Apps	Goals	Apps	Goals
Porto	2003–04	Primeira Liga	0	0	1	0	0	0	1	0
Porto	2004–05	Primeira Liga	4	0	0	0	0	0	4	0
Porto	Total		4	0	1	0	0	0	5	0
Estrela Amadora (loan)	2005–06	Primeira Liga	25	2	2	0	—		27	2
União Leiria (loan)	2006–07	Primeira Liga	26	0	1	0	—		27	0
Leixões (loan)	2007–08	Primeira Liga	25	2	3	1	—		28	3
Saint-Étienne (loan)	2008–09	Ligue 1	35	3	3	0	8 (Note: Appearances in UEFA Europa League)	1	46	4
Toulouse	2009–10	Ligue 1	32	5	4	2	6	0	42	7
Toulouse	2010–11	Ligue 1	33	4	0	0	—		33	4
Toulouse	2011–12	Ligue 1	24	3	1	0	—		25	3
Toulouse	2012–13	Ligue 1	0	0	0	0	—		0	0
Toulouse	Total		89	12	5	2	6	0	100	14
Olympiacos	2012–13	Super League Greece	28	2	6	0	8 (Note: Six appearances and one goal in UEFA Champions League, two appearances in UEFA Europa League)	1	42	3
Olympiacos	2013–14	Super League Greece	17	3	4	0	4 (Note: Appearances in UEFA Champions League)	0	25	3
Olympiacos	Total		45	5	10	0	12	1	67	6
Dinamo Zagreb	2014–15	Croatian Football League	29	2	7 (Note: Includes appearance in Croatian Football Super Cup)	1	9 (Note: Four appearances in UEFA Champions League, five appearances and one goal in UEFA Europa League)	1	45	4
Dinamo Zagreb	2015–16	Croatian Football League	28	1	4	1	11	0	43	2
Dinamo Zagreb	2016–17	Croatian Football League	17	0	5	0	7	1	29	1
Dinamo Zagreb	Total		74	3	16	2	27	2	117	7
Dinamo Zagreb II	2015–16	Second Football League	1	0	—				1	0
Dinamo Zagreb II	2016–17	Second Football League	4	0	—				4	0
Dinamo Zagreb II	Total		5	0	0	0	0	0	5	0
Aves	2017–18	Primeira Liga	23	4	5	1	0	0	28	5
Mumbai City	2018–19	Indian Super League	20	2			0	0	20	2
Mumbai City	2019–20	Indian Super League	9	1	0	0	0	0	9	1
Mumbai City	Total		29	3			0	0	29	3
Career total			380	34	46	6	53	4	479	44

=== International ===
Portugal
Year	Apps	Goals
2010	1	0
2011	3	0
2012	1	0
2013	1	0
Total	6	0

== Honours ==
Olympiacos

- Super League Greece: 2012–13, 2013–14
- Greek Football Cup: 2012–13

Dinamo Zagreb

- Croatian Football League: 2014–15, 2015–16
- Croatian Football Cup: 2014–15, 2015–16

Aves

- Taça de Portugal: 2017–18

Portugal

- UEFA European Under-17 Championship: 2003
