= Gonçalo Santos =

Portuguese footballer (born 1986)

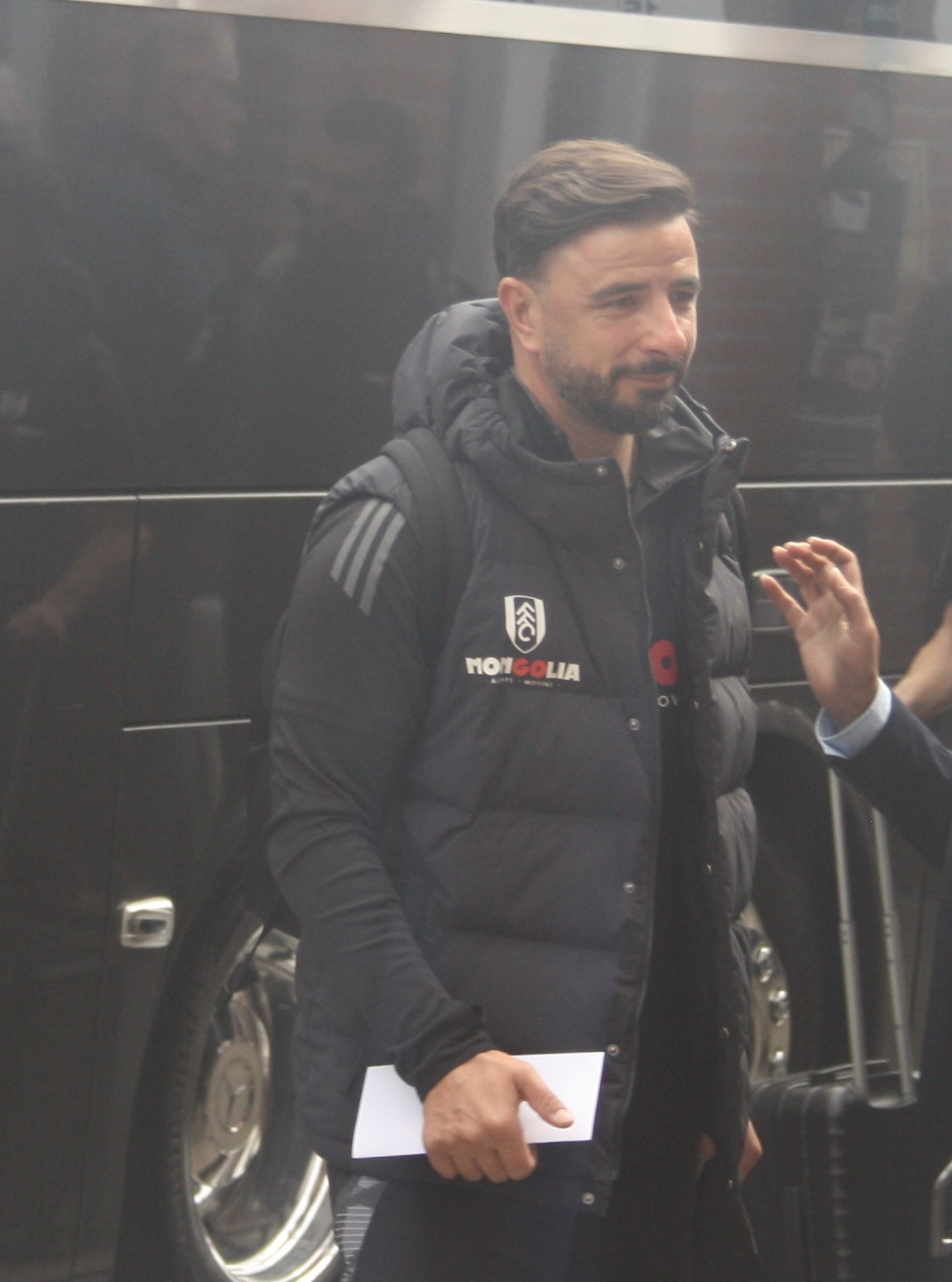
- Santos in 2025

Personal information
- Full name: Gonçalo José Gonçalves dos Santos
- Date of birth: 15 November 1986 (age 39)
- Place of birth: Lamego, Portugal
- Height: 1.85 m (6 ft 1 in)
- Position: Defensive midfielder

Team information
- Current team: Benfica (assistant)

Youth career
- 1996–2002: Cracks Lamego
- 2002–2005: Académica

Senior career*
Years	Team	Apps	(Gls)
2005–2011	Académica	3	(0)
2005–2009	→ Tourizense (loan)	84	(3)
2009–2010	→ Santa Clara (loan)	11	(0)
2010–2011	→ Aves (loan)	14	(0)
2011–2014	Estoril	83	(2)
2014–2017	Dinamo Zagreb	40	(0)
2015–2017	Dinamo Zagreb II	40	(0)
2017–2018	Aves	3	(0)
2018–2020	Estoril	51	(1)
2020–2021	Ethnikos Achna	8	(1)
2021	Vilafranquense	13	(0)
Total		350	(7)

Managerial career
- 2022: Real Massamá (assistant)
- 2022–2023: Estoril (youth)
- 2023–2024: Casa Pia (assistant)
- 2024: Casa Pia
- 2024–2026: Fulham (assistant)
- 2026–: Benfica (assistant)
- * Club domestic league appearances and goals

Gonçalo José Gonçalves dos Santos (born 15 November 1986) is a Portuguese former professional footballer who played as a defensive midfielder. He is currently assistant manager at Primeira Liga club Benfica.

He spent most of his career in two spells at Estoril, making 72 Primeira Liga appearances for that club, Académica and Aves. He added 106 in the second tier for four teams, winning the 2012 title with Estoril. Abroad, he won two consecutive league and cup doubles with Dinamo Zagreb in Croatia.

== Playing career ==
=== Early years ===
Born in Lamego, Viseu District, Santos completed his development at Académica de Coimbra, where he made three Primeira Liga appearances in February 2009. He also had loans at G.D. Tourizense in the third division and C.D. Santa Clara and C.D. Aves of the second.

Santos joined G.D. Estoril Praia in July 2011. He played 28 matches – all starts – as they won the second tier, scoring once for the game's only at U.D. Oliveirense on 26 February 2012. The following 6 January, he scored his only goal in his country's top flight, consolation in a 1–3 home loss against S.L. Benfica.

=== Dinamo Zagreb ===
On 23 June 2014, Santos signed a three-year contract at GNK Dinamo Zagreb in the Croatian Football League. He made his debut on 11 July in the Super Cup, a 2–1 defeat to HNK Rijeka in which he was substituted at half-time for Marcelo Brozović; he won the league and cup double in each of his first two seasons, but played in neither cup final.

=== Return to Portugal ===
In June 2017, Santos returned to his country's top flight with Aves. The following 27 January, after only four competitive appearances, he went back to Estoril. Having been relegated in his first season back, he scored his first goal in over six years on 29 January 2019, opening a 2–1 win over S.C. Braga B at the Estádio António Coimbra da Mota; he served as club captain.

After a brief spell at Ethnikos Achna FC of the Cypriot First Division, Santos returned to Portugal's second tier on 27 January 2021, signing an 18-month deal at U.D. Vilafranquense. He retired at the end of the campaign, however, aged 34.

== Coaching career ==
Santos started working as an assistant manager at Liga 3 club Real SC. He returned to Estoril in summer 2022, taking charge of their under-19 side.

For 2023–24, Santos joined top-division Casa Pia A.C. as an assistant. On 16 February 2024, following the sacking of Pedro Moreira, he was appointed their head coach as they sat 16th in the league table. Three months later, having finally finished ninth, he announced his decision to leave.

In July 2024, Santos reunited with his former Estoril boss Marco Silva at Premier League side Fulham, as assistant.

== Managerial statistics ==
As of 17 May 2024

Managerial record by team and tenure
Team	Nat	From	To	Record								Ref
Team	Nat	From	To	G	W	D	L	GF	GA	GD	Win %	Ref
Casa Pia	(Portugal)	16 February 2024	22 May 2024	13	5	3	5	19	15	+4	38.46	
Total				13	5	3	5	19	15	+4	38.46	—

== Honours ==
Estoril

- Liga de Honra: 2011–12

Dinamo Zagreb

- Croatian Football League: 2014–15, 2015–16
- Croatian Football Cup: 2014–15, 2015–16
