= Velika Mlaka =

- Village
- Location within Croatia
- Coordinates: 45°44′08″N 16°01′49″E
- Country: Croatia
- Region: Central Croatia
- County: Zagreb County
- Town: Velika Gorica

Area
  - Total: 4.8 km^{2} (1.9 sq mi)

Population (2021)
  - Total: 3,395
  - Density: 710/km^{2} (1,800/sq mi)
- Time zone: UTC+1 (CET)
  - Summer (DST): UTC+2 (CEST)

Velika Mlaka is a village in Croatia.
