= Marko Rog =

Croatian footballer (born 1995)

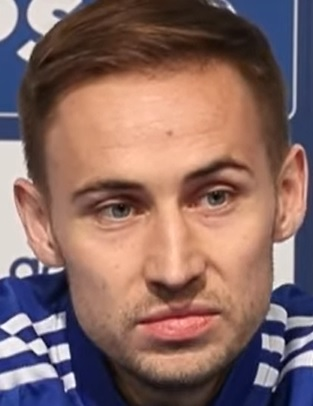
- Rog in 2024

Personal information
- Date of birth: 19 July 1995 (age 31)
- Place of birth: Varaždin, Croatia
- Height: 1.80 m (5 ft 11 in)
- Position: Midfielder

Team information
- Current team: calicut
- Number: 26

Youth career
- 2001–2006: Nedeljanec
- 2006–2013: Varaždin (Note: Varteks changed its name to Varaždin in 2010.)

Senior career*
Years	Team	Apps	(Gls)
2013–2014	Varaždin	30	(17)
2014–2015	RNK Split	30	(7)
2015–2016	Dinamo Zagreb	40	(5)
2016–2020	Napoli	52	(2)
2019	→ Sevilla (loan)	10	(0)
2019–2020	→ Cagliari (loan)	30	(1)
2020–2025	Cagliari	43	(1)
2024–2025	→ Dinamo Zagreb (loan)	28	(1)
2026–	Calicut FC	0	(0)

International career^{‡}
2014–2017	Croatia U21	9	(1)
2014–	Croatia	21	(0)
- * Club domestic league appearances and goals as of 15 June 2026 ‡ National team caps and goals as of 17 November 2020

Marko Rog (Croatian pronunciation: [mâːrko rôːɡ]; born 19 July 1995) is a Croatian professional footballer who plays as a midfielder for Super League Kerala club calicut and the Croatia national team.

== Club career ==
=== Early career ===
Rog started his senior football in 2013 with NK Varaždin, which was coming off being suspended in the 2011–12 season due to financial difficulties. The club, previously in the Prva HNL, was allowed back in at the 3. HNL, where Rog was Varaždin's top goalscorer, scoring 17 times in 30 league matches, as his side finished 7th.

He moved to Croatian First Football League side RNK Split in the summer 2014 for an undisclosed fee, though it did not help Varaždin, which folded in 2015 (no relation to the NK Varaždin (2012) club). On 28 July 2014, Rog made his professional debut for RNK Split playing against Istra 1961. His first and only season with Split was highly successful, scoring nine goals in 44 appearances.

=== Dinamo Zagreb ===
In June 2015, Rog joined Dinamo Zagreb. He signed a five-year contract with the club for a reported fee of €5 million; a record transfer for the Croatian league. On 12 July 2015, aged 19, he made an official league debut for Dinamo Zagreb, coming on as a substitute for Ante Ćorić in a first league game of the season against Hajduk Split on the home stadium and also received a yellow card in the game.

=== Napoli ===
On 29 August 2016, Rog joined Serie A side Napoli on a five-year contract. He scored his first goal for the club in 3–1 win over Atalanta on 27 August 2017. All 28 of his games in the 2017–18 season which he played in Serie A were played from the substitutes' bench, as were all of his other matches, except from one match in the UEFA Europa League and two matches in the Coppa Italia. He was versatile in this season, playing in the right and centre of midfield, and at centre forward, at various stages in the campaign. He scored one goal (against Atalanta) and made one assist (against Red Bull Leipzig). He received 4 yellow cards and played 251 minutes of football.

Rog made 1.2 tackles and 1.1 fouls per match in Serie A in the 2016–17 season as well as partaking in 1.2 dribbles per match in 373 minutes of game time, and in 2017–18 made 0.4 tackles and 0.4 fouls per game and made 0.4 dribbles per game in 251 minutes of game time, and in 2018–19 made 1.3 tackles and 1.3 fouls per match as well as 0.6 interceptions (his highest of any season), and 0.9 dribbles per match. He scored once for Napoli in the 2018–19 Serie A. He made his most starts for Napoli in the league in 2018–19. His passing success rate was always high in the league, ranging from 87.5 to 91.6% over the three seasons in the league. He has featured little in Europe for the Neapolitans.

==== Sevilla (loan) ====
On 29 January 2019, Rog joined on loan to Spanish La Liga side Sevilla until 30 June 2019. Rog started his first two matches for Sevilla in La Liga in defeats against Barcelona and Huesca. He also started in a 3–0 loss to Leganés and a 2–0 victory over Athletic Bilbao. He made six further appearances in the league from the bench. He featured in three matches in the UEFA Europa League. At Sevilla, his passing success rate was 86.4% and he was given two yellow cards.

=== Cagliari ===
On 17 July 2019, Cagliari bought the footballer from Napoli. Rog joined Cagliari on loan with an obligation set at €18 million including bonuses.

=== Return to Dinamo Zagreb ===
On 12 February 2024, Rog returned to Dinamo Zagreb on loan until the end of 2024. The loan was extended for six additional months in January 2025.

== International career ==
On 12 November 2014, Rog made his international debut for the Croatia national team against Argentina coming as an 84th-minute substitute for Duje Čop. He was part of the Croatian squad at the UEFA Euro 2016 in France. He was in the starting lineup for the team's final group match, a 2–1 win against Spain, which was his only appearance at the tournament.

A regular member of the Croatian squad during the 2018 FIFA World Cup qualifying, Rog made five appearances as a substitute. In May 2018 he was named in Croatia's preliminary 32-man squad for the 2018 World Cup in Russia but did not make the final 23.

== Style of play ==
Rog is regarded as highly talented prospect. He is most played in the attacking midfield and winger roles. Regular starting in the central attacking midfield position to build up play with his creative and sharp passing, he has been compared to the likes of Ivan Rakitić. However, Rog's explosive strength and pace make a him a very different player altogether. Rog is aggressive and has extreme balance making him very difficult to knock off the ball, but also allowing him to pressure and win balls either deep or higher up the pitch. Napoli utilizes Rog in this way.

Rog has the freedom and ability to drop deeper into a central defensive midfield slot where he can tackle and win balls with his aggression. Thereafter, he is given the freedom to either drift wide and open up space for his side to counter-attack in to or run directly at the opposition defense towards goal.

== Career statistics ==
=== Club ===
As of match played 23 September 2025

Appearances and goals by club, season and competition
Club	Season	League			National cup (Note: Includes Croatian Cup, Coppa Italia and Copa del Rey)		Europe		Other		Total	
Club	Season	Division	Apps	Goals	Apps	Goals	Apps	Goals	Apps	Goals	Apps	Goals
Varaždin	2013–14	Treća HNL	30	17	1	0	—		—		31	17
RNK Split	2014–15	Prva HNL	30	7	7	1	7 (Note: Appearances in UEFA Europa League)	1	—		44	9
Dinamo Zagreb	2015–16	Prva HNL	34	3	4	1	12 (Note: Appearances in UEFA Champions League)	2	—		50	6
Dinamo Zagreb	2016–17	Prva HNL	6	2	—		6	3	—		12	5
Dinamo Zagreb	Total		40	5	4	1	18	5	—		62	11
Napoli	2016–17	Serie A	15	0	2	0	2	0	—		19	0
Napoli	2017–18	Serie A	28	1	2	0	7 (Note: Six appearances in UEFA Champions League, one appearance in UEFA Europa League)	0	—		37	1
Napoli	2018–19	Serie A	9	1	0	0	2	0	—		11	1
Napoli	Total		52	2	4	0	11	0	—		67	2
Sevilla (loan)	2018–19	La Liga	10	0	0	0	3	0	—		13	0
Cagliari (loan)	2019–20	Serie A	30	1	2	1	—		—		32	2
Cagliari	2020–21	Serie A	14	0	2	0	—		—		16	0
Cagliari	2021–22	Serie A	8	0	—		—		—		8	0
Cagliari	2022–23	Serie B	21	1	—		—		2 (Note: Appearances in Serie B play-offs)	0	23	1
Cagliari	2025–26	Serie A	0	0	1	0	—		—		1	0
Cagliari	Total		73	2	5	1	—		2	0	80	3
Dinamo Zagreb (loan)	2023–24	Prva HNL	6	0	3	0	—		—		9	0
Dinamo Zagreb (loan)	2024–25	Prva HNL	22	1	0	0	9	0	—		31	1
Dinamo Zagreb (loan)	Total		28	1	3	0	9	0	—		40	1
Career total			263	34	24	3	48	6	2	0	337	43

=== International ===
As of match played 17 November 2020

Appearances and goals by national team and year
National team	Year	Apps	Goals
Croatia	2014	1	0
Croatia	2015	0	0
Croatia	2016	6	0
Croatia	2017	4	0
Croatia	2018	5	0
Croatia	2019	1	0
Croatia	2020	4	0
Total		21	0

== Honours ==
Dinamo Zagreb

- Prva HNL: 2015–16, 2023–24
- Croatian Cup: 2015–16, 2023–24
