= Junior Fernandes =

Chilean footballer (born 1988)

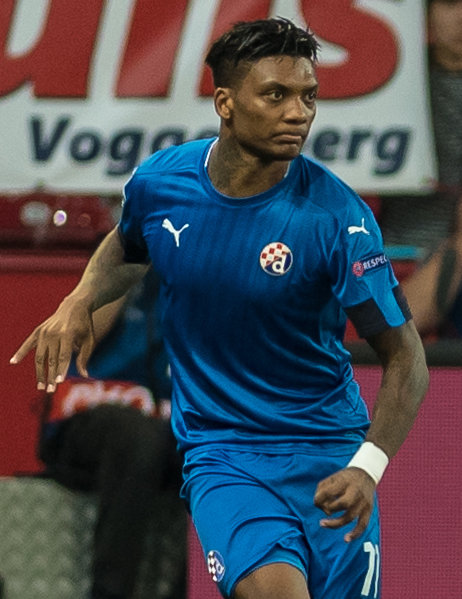
- Fernandes with Dinamo Zagreb in 2016

Personal information
- Full name: Antenor Junior Fernandes da Silva Vitoria
- Date of birth: 10 April 1988 (age 38)
- Place of birth: Tocopilla, Chile
- Height: 1.84 m (6 ft 0 in)
- Position: Forward

Team information
- Current team: Rudeš

Youth career
- 1995–2006: Cobreloa

Senior career*
Years	Team	Apps	(Gls)
2007–2009	Cobreloa	51	(2)
2007	→ Municipal Mejillones (loan)	20	(12)
2010	Magallanes	25	(10)
2011	Palestino	35	(9)
2012	Universidad de Chile	17	(8)
2012–2014	Bayer Leverkusen	6	(0)
2013–2014	→ Dinamo Zagreb (loan)	28	(13)
2014–2017	Dinamo Zagreb	74	(25)
2017	→ Alanyaspor (loan)	14	(6)
2017–2020	Alanyaspor	80	(26)
2020–2021	Ittihad Kalba	13	(3)
2021	İstanbul Başakşehir	9	(1)
2021–2022	Universidad de Chile	34	(4)
2023	Manisa	14	(3)
2023–2024	Adanaspor	27	(9)
2024–2025	Esenler Erokspor	36	(13)
2025–2026	Keçiörengücü	35	(13)
2026–	Rudeš	3	(0)

International career^{‡}
2011–	Chile	20	(0)
- * Club domestic league appearances and goals as of 5 May 2026 ‡ National team caps and goals as of 10 October 2022

Antenor Junior Fernandes da Silva Vitoria (Spanish pronunciation: [ˈɟʝunjoɾ feɾˈnandes]; born 10 April 1988), better known as Junior Fernandes, is a Chilean professional footballer who plays as a forward for Croatian club Rudeš.

== Club career ==
=== Cobreloa ===
The son of Brazilian parents, Fernandes, moved from his native Tocopilla to Calama at the age of six, where he attended school along with his brother Christian. They participated in sports and music. While he lived in Calama, he joined the lower divisions of Cobreloa, participating in each of their youth categories, and was integrated into Cobreloa's B team that participated in the Chilean Third Division during the 2006 season. In this period of time, he shared team and home with countryman forward Alexis Sánchez.

Later, in 2007, he was sent on loan to Mejillones (another third division team) after Cobreloa gave up their reserve team.

After the request of coach Lewis Sheldon, Fernandes joined Cobreloa's first team to face the Clausura tournament . His professional debut came in the fourth round of the championship, when he replaced striker Felipe Flores in a match that would end with a 2–1 victory over La Serena. His first time as a starter was in a game against Melipilla, which ended in a 5–1 victory, with Fernandes scoring a hat trick.

=== Palestino ===
In 2010, he played for Magallanes of the Chilean Tercera División A where he became the figure of the team that won the championship and was promoted to the Primera B. His outstanding performance on Magallanes caught the attention of Palestino, who joined them in 2011. Thanks to his good results, he was later nominated for the Under 25 Chile national football team.

=== Universidad de Chile ===
On 2 December 2011, Palestino agreed on the sale of 50% of his pass with a US$700,000 transfer to Universidad de Chile aiming to win the 2012 Apertura tournament, and thinking that the team will play Copa Libertadores next year. On 5 December, he was presented in the offices of "the Blues" Sports Complex with the No. 9 jersey. Fernandes made his debut for the club, scoring and providing an assist in a 3–1 win over Deportes La Serena on 4 February 2012. In the league, he would score five goals. In the play-offs Apertura, Fernándes scored a hat-trick in a 4–0 win over Colo-Colo on 24 June 2012. Elsewhere in the Copa Libertadores, Fernandes scored a hat-trick, set up a goal in a 5–1 win over Godoy Cruz, and soon scored a brace and provided an assist in a 6–0 win over Deportivo Quito. Soon after scoring goals, he would receive criticism over his performance.

=== Bayer Leverkusen ===
On 6 July 2012, he signed for Bundesliga squad Bayer 04 Leverkusen from Universidad de Chile for a transfer fee of €7 million and a five-year contract. Fernandes made his debut for the club, scoring on his debut in first round of DFB-Pokal in a 4–0 win over Carl Zeiss Jena; seven days later, he made his debut, coming on as a substitute, in a 2–1 loss against Frankfurt. However, in his first season, Junior Fernandes playing time was reduced, as well his first team and haven't scored his first goal for the club.

=== Dinamo Zagreb ===
On 26 May 2013, it was announced that Fernandes signed a one-year-loan contract with the Croatian club Dinamo Zagreb. On 23 April 2014, following the end of his loan spell, Fernandes signed a six-year contract with Dinamo Zagreb.

=== Alanyaspor ===
In January 2017 he was loaned to Alanyaspor until the end of the 2016–17 season. He returned to Dinamo for the 2017–18 season and scored twice against defending league champion Rijeka. However, as Dinamo failed to qualify into Europa League, losing to Skënderbeu Korçë in the play-off round, he moved back to Alanyaspor on a permanent transfer.

=== Ittihad Kalba ===
On 19 August 2020, Fernandes joined Ittihad Kalba of the UAE Pro League.

=== İstanbul Başakşehir ===
On 23 January 2021, Fernandes agreed to a return to Turkey and joined İstanbul Başakşehir on a free transfer.

=== Manisa FK ===
On 16 January 2023, Fernandes agreed to a return to Turkey and joined Manisa in the TFF First League on a free transfer.

== International career ==
Fernandes was called up to the Chile national football team to face friendly matches during the second half of 2011 by team manager Claudio Borghi. He debuted officially in the national team on 11 September 2012, on a qualifying match for the 2014 FIFA World Cup against Colombia.

He was named in the preliminary squad for the 2015 Copa América but was omitted from the final squad. He made the final squad for the 2019 Copa América, his first major tournament.

== Honours ==
Magallanes

- Tercera División de Chile: 2010

Universidad de Chile

- Primera División de Chile: 2012 Apertura

Dinamo Zagreb

- Croatian First League: 2013–14, 2014–15, 2015–16, 2017–18
- Croatian Cup: 2014–15, 2015–16
- Croatian Super Cup: 2013

Chile

- China Cup: 2017

Individual

- SIFUP Best Right Forward: 2013 Torneo de Transición
