= Leonardo Sigali =

Argentine footballer

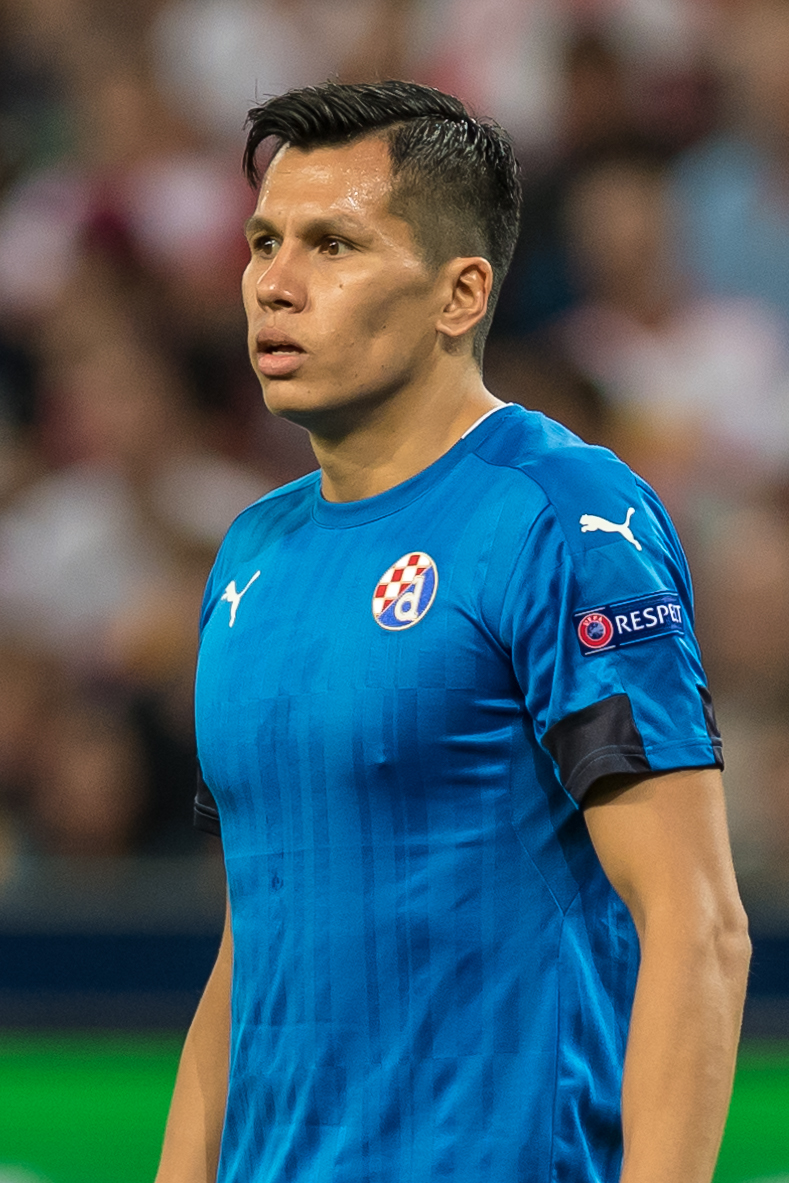
- Sigali with Dinamo Zagreb, August 2016.

Personal information
- Full name: Leonardo Germán Sigali
- Date of birth: May 29, 1987 (age 39)
- Place of birth: Campana, Argentina
- Height: 1.81 m (5 ft 11 in)
- Position: Centre-back

Team information
- Current team: Aldosivi
- Number: 2

Youth career
- 1998–2003: Villa Dálmine
- 2003–2005: Nueva Chicago

Senior career*
Years	Team	Apps	(Gls)
2005–2007	Nueva Chicago	59	(1)
2007–2010	Villarreal	0	(0)
2007–2008	→ Lanús (loan)	18	(1)
2008–2010	→ Godoy Cruz (loan)	62	(7)
2010–2014	Godoy Cruz	174	(7)
2014–2018	Dinamo Zagreb	112	(8)
2018–2025	Racing Club	160	(9)
2025–2026	Lokomotiva	13	(0)
2026–	Aldosivi	6	(0)

International career
2007	Argentina U20	1	(0)
- * Club domestic league appearances and goals as of 17:39, 6 November 2026 (UTC)

Leonardo Germán Sigali (Spanish pronunciation: [leoˈnaɾðo siˈɣali]; born 28 May 1987) is an Argentine professional footballer who plays as a centre-back for Aldosivi.

== Club career ==
Sigali came through the youth system at Nueva Chicago, club from the Western part of the Argentine capital, to make his professional debut in 2006. With Nueva Chicago Sigali formed part of the team that was champion of the Primera B Nacional (Argentine second division) 2006 Clausura, and ascended to the Argentine Primera. He played the 2006-07 season with Chicago in Primera as a central defender along Nicolás Sánchez. However, the club was relegated after losing the playoff to Tigre.

Subsequently, Sigali was bought by Spanish side Villarreal. However, he was immediately loaned to Lanús in 2007, as they needed more defensive cover due to injuries of other key players. He helped his new team to win the Apertura 2007 tournament, Lanús' first ever top flight league title.

In 2008, he joined newly promoted Godoy Cruz, on loan. The deal was made permanent in 2010, when Godoy Cruz bought 50% of Sigali's rights.

== International career ==
In 2007, Sigali was part of the Argentine squad that won the 2007 U-20 World Cup.

== Honours ==
Lanús

- Primera División: 2007 Apertura

Dinamo Zagreb

- Prva HNL: 2014–15, 2015–16
- Croatian Cup: 2014–15, 2015–16

Racing Club

- Primera División: 2018–19
- Trofeo de Campeones de la Superliga Argentina: 2019
- Trofeo de Campeones de la Liga Profesional: 2022
- Copa Sudamericana: 2024

Argentina U20

- FIFA U-20 World Cup: 2007
