= Ante Ćorić =

Croatian footballer (born 1997)

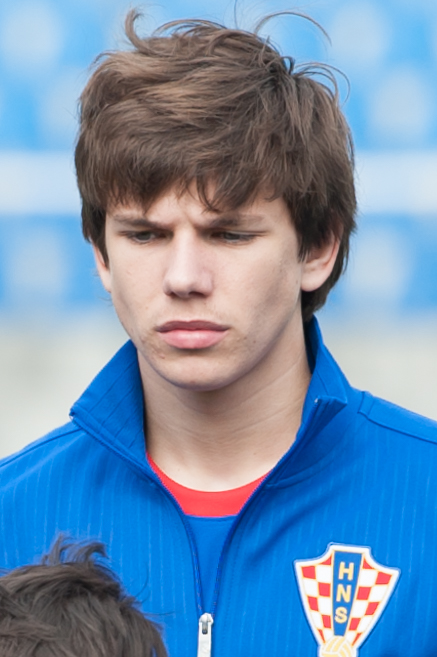
- Ćorić with Croatia U19 in 2015

Personal information
- Date of birth: 14 April 1997 (age 29)
- Place of birth: Zagreb, Croatia
- Height: 1.76 m (5 ft 9 in)
- Position: Attacking midfielder

Youth career
- 2002–2006: Hrvatski Dragovoljac
- 2006–2009: NK Zagreb
- 2009–2013: Red Bull Salzburg
- 2013–2014: Dinamo Zagreb

Senior career*
Years	Team	Apps	(Gls)
2014–2018	Dinamo Zagreb	102	(15)
2018–2023	Roma	2	(0)
2019–2020	→ Almería (loan)	16	(0)
2020–2021	→ VVV-Venlo (loan)	1	(0)
2021	→ Olimpija Ljubljana (loan)	6	(0)
2021–2022	→ Zürich (loan)	21	(1)
2024	Rudeš	13	(1)
2024–2025	Varaždin	2	(0)
2025	Ħamrun Spartans	10	(0)
2026–	Ħamrun Spartans	0	(0)

International career
2012	Croatia U15	4	(1)
2012–2013	Croatia U16	5	(1)
2012–2013	Croatia U17	8	(0)
2014	Croatia U18	3	(0)
2014–2015	Croatia U19	7	(0)
2014–2018	Croatia U21	18	(3)
2016–2017	Croatia	4	(0)
- * Club domestic league appearances and goals as of 23:18, 29 December 2025 (UTC)

Ante Ćorić (Croatian pronunciation: [ǎːnte tɕǒːritɕ]; born 14 April 1997) is a Croatian professional footballer who plays as an attacking midfielder for Maltese Premier League club Ħamrun Spartans. He played for the Croatia national team and was capped four times between 2016 and 2017.

== Club career ==
=== Early years ===
Ćorić started playing football at the age of 5 at Hrvatski Dragovoljac. When he was 9 years old, he signed for the youth academy of NK Zagreb. In 2009, he joined the youth academy of Red Bull Salzburg, despite the interest from other clubs, including Bayern Munich, Chelsea, and Barcelona. On joining the club, he commented, "I wanted to become a Red Bull Salzburg player because my team-mates here are better than players of the same age anywhere else. We train better and more often than others. And I was very impressed by how warmly I was welcomed." In 2013, after four years in Salzburg, he returned to Croatia and signed with Dinamo Zagreb for a fee of €900,000.

=== Dinamo Zagreb ===
On 16 April 2014, Ćorić made his senior debut against RNK Split, coming in as a 69th-minute substitute for Ivo Pinto. On 26 April, he made his first start in a 1–1 draw against Lokomotiva Zagreb. On 10 May, he scored his first senior goal for Dinamo in a 1–2 loss to NK Istra 1961. On 18 September, Ćorić came on as a 77th-minute substitute and scored the fifth goal in Dinamo's 2014–15 Europa League opener against Astra Giurgiu, a 5–1 win. With this goal, he became the youngest goalscorer in Europa League history, at the age of 17 years and 157 days. In 2015, the newspaper, Večernji list, awarded Ćorić the Croatian Hope of the Year award. In his nearly five seasons at the club, Ćorić made 143 appearances, winning four league titles, and two cup titles, and was named by the Italian newspaper, Gazzetta Dello Sport, as one of the "30 Best U20 Players in Europe" in 2017.

=== Roma ===
On 28 May 2018, Ćorić joined Italian club Roma for a reported fee of €6 million and signed a five-year contract on €1 million salary per year, after passing his medical.

==== Almería (loan) ====
On 27 August 2019, Ćorić joined Spanish club Almería in the Segunda División on loan for the 2019–20 season.

==== VVV-Venlo (loan) ====
On 3 October 2020, Ćorić moved to Dutch club VVV-Venlo, on a loan deal until the end of the season. The deal included an option to buy.

==== Olimpija Ljubljana (loan) ====
On 16 February 2021, due to a lack of playing time Ćorić ended his loan with VVV-Venlo and joined Slovenian side Olimpija Ljubljana on a loan deal for the remainder of the 2020–21 Slovenian PrvaLiga season.

=== Rudeš ===
On 13 January 2024, Ćorić returned to Croatia, signing a one-and-a-half-year contract with HNL club Rudeš.

== International career ==
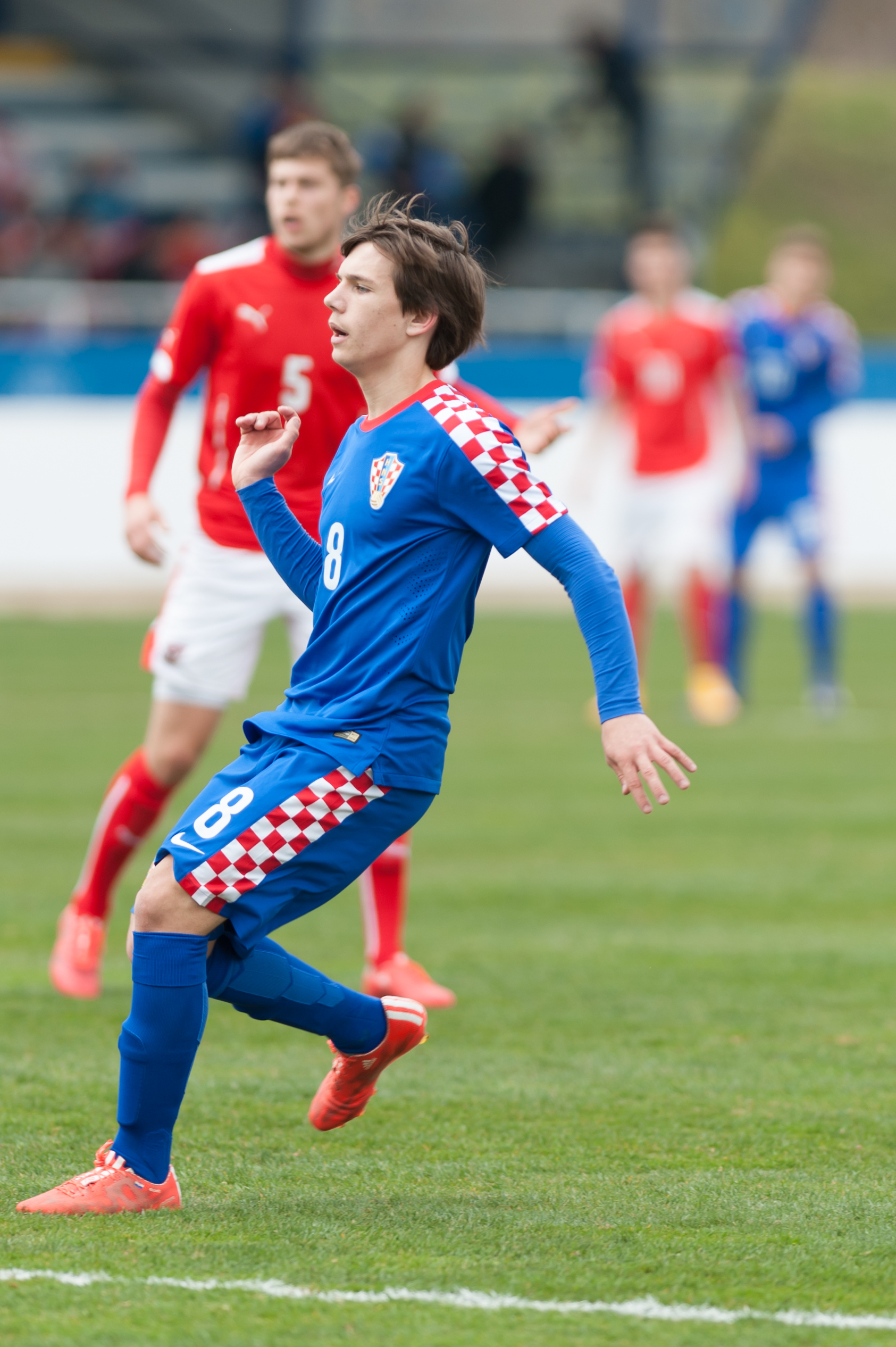
Ćorić with the Croatia U19 national team, during a match against Austria

Ćorić played with Croatia's youth teams, from 2012 to 2016, and made his senior international debut in a 1–0 win over Moldova on 27 May 2016, entering as a half-time substitute.

In May 2016, he was selected in Croatia's 23-man final squad for UEFA Euro 2016.

== Personal life ==
Ćorić was born in Zagreb to Herzegovinian Croat parents from Široki Brijeg; his father, Miljenko, is a football manager in the Zagreb area with whom Ante attended training sessions starting at a very young age.

Ćorić is engaged to Sara Prenga, Besnik Prenga's daughter and Herdi Prenga's sister.

== Career statistics ==
=== Club ===
As of match played 22 May 2021

Appearances and goals by club, season and competition
Club	Season	League			National cup (Note: Includes Croatian Cup, Copa del Rey, KNVB Cup)		Continental		Total	
Club	Season	Division	Apps	Goals	Apps	Goals	Apps	Goals	Apps	Goals
Dinamo Zagreb	2013–14	1. HNL	6	1	0	0	0	0	6	1
Dinamo Zagreb	2014–15	1. HNL	24	3	5	1	4 (Note: One appearance in UEFA Champions League, three appearances and one goal in UEFA Europa League)	1	33	5
Dinamo Zagreb	2015–16	1. HNL	28	4	6	1	7 (Note: Appearance(s) in UEFA Champions League)	0	41	5
Dinamo Zagreb	2016–17	1. HNL	23	4	4	3	9	1	36	8
Dinamo Zagreb	2017–18	1. HNL	21	3	3	1	3 (Note: Appearances in UEFA Europa League)	0	27	4
Dinamo Zagreb	Total		102	15	18	6	23	2	143	23
Roma	2018–19	Serie A	2	0	0	0	1	0	3	0
Almería (loan)	2019–20	Segunda División	16	0	1	0	—		17	0
VVV-Venlo (loan)	2020–21	Eredivisie	1	0	2	0	—		3	0
Olimpija Ljubljana (loan)	2020–21	Slovenian PrvaLiga	6	0	0	0	—		6	0
Career total			127	15	21	6	24	2	172	23

=== International ===
As of match played 28 March 2017

Appearances and goals by national team and year
National team	Year	Apps	Goals
Croatia	2016	3	0
Croatia	2017	1	0
Total		4	0

== Honours ==
Dinamo Zagreb

- Croatian Football League: 2013–14, 2014–15, 2015–16, 2017–18
- Croatian Cup: 2014–15, 2015–16, 2017–18

Olimpija Ljubljana

- Slovenian Cup: 2020–21

Zürich

- Swiss Super League: 2021–22

Individual

- Croatian Football Hope of the Year: 2015
