= 2014–15 Croatian Football Cup =

Tournament details
- Country: Croatia
- Teams: 48

Final positions
- Champions: Dinamo Zagreb (13th title)
- Runners-up: RNK Split

Tournament statistics
- Matches played: 53
- Goals scored: 189 (3.57 per match)
- Top goal scorer: Ángelo Henríquez (6)

The 2014–15 Croatian Football Cup was the twenty-fourth season of Croatia's football knockout competition. The defending champions are Rijeka, having won their third title the previous year by defeating Dinamo Zagreb in the final.

== Calendar ==
Round	Date(s)	Number of fixtures	Clubs	New entries this round	Goals / games
Preliminary round	27 August 2014	16	32 → 16	32	62 / 16
First round	24 September 2014	16	32 → 16	16	64 / 16
Second round	29 October 2014	8	16 → 8	none	32 / 8
Quarter-finals	11 February and 4 March 2015	8	8 → 4	none	25 / 8
Semi-finals	8 and 22 April 2015	4	4 → 2	none	6 / 4
Final	20 May 2015	1	2 → 1	none	0 / 1

== Preliminary round ==
The draw for the preliminary round was held on 11 August 2014 with matches scheduled on 27 August 2014.

Tie no	Home team	Score	Away team
1	Vuteks Sloga	3–0 (aet)	Mladost Cernik
2	Plitvica	1–7	Bistra
3^{**}	RNK Split	1–0	Croatia Grabrovnica
4	Segesta	3–1	Mladost Ždralovi
5	Lučko	0–1	Novigrad
6	Mladost Antin	4–1	Mladost Palinovec
7	Slavonija Požega	8–0	Croatia Lički Osik
8	Ponikve	4–1 (aet)	Radoboj
9^{*}	Lekenik	2–1 (aet)	Stupnik
10	Funtana	2–0	Podravina Ludbreg
11	Zrinski Jurjevac	4–0	Ogulin
12	BSK Bijelo Brdo	4–0	Vodice
13	GOŠK Dubrovnik	3–0	Suhopolje
14	Primorac Biograd	0–1	Međimurje
15	Opatija	3–2	Borac Imbriovec
16	Podravac	3–2 (aet)	Oriolik

* Match played on 26 August.

** Match played on 3 September.

== First round ==
First round proper will consist of 16 single-legged matches, with 16 winners of the preliminary round joined by 16 clubs with the highest cup coefficients. Matches are scheduled for 24 September 2014.

Tie no	Home team	Score	Away team
1	Ponikve	1–2	Dinamo Zagreb
2	Funtana	0–2	Hajduk Split
3^{**}	Lekenik	2–4	Rijeka
4	Vuteks Sloga	0–3	Osijek
5	Zrinski Jurjevac	1–5	Slaven Belupo
6	Mladost Antin	0–1	Varaždin
7	Bistra	0–2	Cibalia
8	Podravac	1–3	Šibenik
9	Slavonija Požega	2–3	Istra 1961
10	Opatija	3–3 (6–5 p)	Zagreb
11^{*}	BSK Bijelo Brdo	2–5	Lokomotiva
12	Novigrad	2–0	Inter Zaprešić
13	Zagora Unešić	1–5	Zadar
14	GOŠK Dubrovnik	7–0	Pomorac Kostrena
15	Međimurje	0–2	Vinogradar
16	Segesta	0–2	RNK Split

* Match played on 23 September.

** Match played on 15 October.

== Second round ==
The second round was contested on 29 October 2014 by 16 winners from the first round in eight single-legged fixtures.

Tie no	Home team	Score	Away team
1	Opatija	2–4 (aet)	Dinamo Zagreb
2	Novigrad	2–3	Hajduk Split
3	GOŠK Dubrovnik	0–3	Rijeka
4	RNK Split	2–0	Osijek
5	Vinogradar	3–0	Slaven Belupo
6	Zadar	5–1	Varaždin
7	Lokomotiva	3–2	Cibalia
8^{*}	Istra 1961	2–0	Šibenik

* Match played on 28 October.

== Quarter-finals ==
Quarter-final ties will be played over two legs, scheduled for 11 February and 4 March 2015. The round featured eight winners from the second round. The unseeded draw for quarter-final pairings was held on 4 November.

Team 1	Agg.	Team 2	1st leg	2nd leg
Vinogradar	0–6	Hajduk Split	0–3	0–3
Istra 1961	0–4	Dinamo Zagreb	0–1	0–3
Rijeka	8–1	Lokomotiva	4–1	4–0
RNK Split	5–1	Zadar	1–0	4–1

== Semi-finals ==
Semi-final ties will be played over two legs and are scheduled for 8 and 22 April 2015. The round featured four winners from the quarter-final. The unseeded draw for semi-final pairings was held on 6 March.

8 April 2015
18:00

Dinamo Zagreb	2–1	Rijeka
Machado 70'; Henriquez 81'	Report (in Croatian)	Lešković 6'

Stadion Maksimir, Zagreb
Attendance: 3,100
Referee: Bruno Marić (Daruvar)
22 April 2015
18:30

Rijeka	0–0	Dinamo Zagreb
	Report (in Croatian)

Stadion Kantrida, Rijeka
Attendance: 8,000
Referee: Mario Zebec (Cestica)

Dinamo Zagreb won 2–1 on aggregate.

8 April 2015
20:00

Hajduk Split	1–1	RNK Split
Sušić 33'	Report (in Croatian)	Erceg 31'

Stadion Poljud, Split
Attendance: 6,000
Referee: Domagoj Vučkov (Rijeka)
22 April 2015
16:30

RNK Split	1–0	Hajduk Split
Cikalleshi 44' (pen.)	Report (in Croatian)

Stadion Park Mladeži, Split
Attendance: 3,500
Referee: Ivan Bebek (Rijeka)

RNK Split won 2–1 on aggregate.

== Final ==
The final was played over one leg on 20 May 2015.

20 May 2015
20:00

Dinamo Zagreb	0–0 (a.e.t.)	RNK Split
	Report (in Croatian)
Penalties
Henríquez (penalty scored); Taravel (penalty scored); Pivarić (penalty scored); Machado (penalty scored)	4–2	(penalty scored) Barbarić; (penalty missed) Rog; (penalty missed) Blagojević; (penalty scored) Mršić

Stadion Maksimir, Zagreb
Attendance: 11,124
Referee: Ivan Bebek (Rijeka)
