= 2015–16 Croatian Football Cup =

Tournament details
- Country: Croatia
- Teams: 48

Final positions
- Champions: Dinamo Zagreb
- Runners-up: Slaven Belupo

Tournament statistics
- Matches played: 47
- Goals scored: 170 (3.62 per match)
- Top goal scorer: Marin Tomasov (5)

The 2015–16 Croatian Football Cup was the twenty-fifth season of Croatia's football knockout competition. The defending champions were Dinamo Zagreb, having won their thirteenth title the previous year by defeating RNK Split in the final.

== Calendar ==
| Round | Date(s) | Number of fixtures | Clubs | New entries this round | Goals / games |
|---|---|---|---|---|---|
| Preliminary round | 26 August 2015 | 16 | 32 → 16 | 32 | 62 / 16 |
| First round | 23 September 2015 | 16 | 32 → 16 | 16 | 64 / 14 |
| Second round | 28 October 2015 | 8 | 16 → 8 | none | 24 / 8 |
| Quarter-finals | 2 December 2015 | 4 | 8 → 4 | none | 7 / 4 |
| Semi-finals | 16 March & 6 April 2016 | 4 | 4 → 2 | none | 12 / 4 |
| Final | 10 May 2016 | 1 | 2 → 1 | none | 3 / 1 |

== Preliminary round ==
The draw for the preliminary round was held on 4 August 2015 at 10:00 in Zagreb. The matches were played on 26 August 2015.

| Tie no | Home team | Score | Away team |
|---|---|---|---|
| 1 | Koprivnica | 0−2 | HAŠK |
| 2 | Oštrc Zlatar | 1−0 | Mosor |
| 3 | Duga Resa 1929 | 2−2 (5–3 p) | Slavonija Požega |
| 4 | Bistra | 1−5 | Lekenik |
| 5 | Segesta | 0−1 | Mladost Ždralovi |
| 6 | Croatia Grabrovnica | 4−0 | Sloga Čakovec |
| 7 | Suhopolje | 0−2 | Tehničar 1974 |
| 8^{*} | Zagora Unešić | 2−3 | Gorica |
| 9 | Vuteks Sloga | 1−2 | Funtana |
| 10 | Omladinac Gornja Vrba | 6−1 | Sloga Novi Mikanovci |
| 11 | Nedelišće | 3−3 (3–5 p) | Sloga Nova Gradiška |
| 12 | BŠK Zmaj | 4−1 (aet) | Đakovo Croatia |
| 13 | Opatija | 5−1 | Polet Cestica |
| 14 | Bednja | 0−0 (5–3 p) | Primorac Biograd |
| 15 | Nehaj Senj | 3−2 | BSK Bijelo Brdo |
| 16^{*} | Jadran Poreč | 4–1 | ZET |

* Matches played on 25 August.

== First round ==
First round consisted of 16 single-legged matches, with 16 winners from the preliminary round joined by 16 clubs with the highest cup coefficients. The matches were played on 23 September 2015.

| Tie no | Home team | Score | Away team |
|---|---|---|---|
| 1^{*} | Oštrc Zlatar | 1–7 | Dinamo Zagreb |
| 2 | Sloga Nova Gradiška | 0–7 | Hajduk Split |
| 3 | Bednja | 0–10 | Rijeka |
| 4^{*} | Duga Resa 1929 | 1–3 | Osijek |
| 5 | Tehničar 1974 | 0–3 | Slaven Belupo |
| 6 | Omladinac Gornja Vrba | 0–6 | Cibalia |
| 7 | Nehaj Senj | 0–8 | Lokomotiva |
| 8 | Croatia Grabrovnica | 0–2 | Istra 1961 |
| 9 | Mladost Ždralovi | bye | VŠNK Varaždin (defunct) |
| 10 | Funtana | 0–3 | Zagreb |
| 11^{*} | Jadran Poreč | 0–3 | Zadar |
| 12 | Lekenik | 1–0 (aet) | Vinogradar |
| 13^{*} | BŠK Zmaj | 2–3 | Inter Zaprešić |
| 14 | Gorica | 0–0 (4–5 p) | Šibenik |
| 15 | Opatija | 4–0 | Zelina |
| 16 | Pomorac Kostrena | bye | HAŠK |

* Matches played on 22 September.

== Second round ==
Second round consisted of eight single-legged ties, with 16 winners from the first round. The pairings were determined by cup coefficients. The matches were played on 28 October 2015.

| Tie no | Home team | Score | Away team |
|---|---|---|---|
| 1^{*} | Mladost Ždralovi | 1–3 | Dinamo Zagreb |
| 2 | Lekenik | 1–5 | Hajduk Split |
| 3 | Opatija | 0–3 | Rijeka |
| 4 | HAŠK | 0–2 | Osijek |
| 5^{*} | Šibenik | 0–2 | Slaven Belupo |
| 6^{*} | Inter Zaprešić | 0–0 (4–3 p) | Cibalia |
| 7 | Zadar | 2–2 (4–5 p) | Lokomotiva |
| 8 | Zagreb | 2–1 (aet) | Istra 1961 |

* Matches played on 27 October.

== Quarter-finals ==
Quarter-finals consisted of four single-legged ties and included eight winners from the second round. The pairings were determined by cup coefficients. The matches were played on 2 December 2015.

| Tie no | Home team | Score | Away team |
|---|---|---|---|
| 1^{*} | Inter Zaprešić | 0–1 | Dinamo Zagreb |
| 2 | Zagreb | 1–2 | Hajduk Split |
| 3^{**} | Lokomotiva | 0–1 | Rijeka |
| 4 | Slaven Belupo | 1–1 (4–1 p) | Osijek |

* Match played on 10 February.

** Match played on 8 December.

== Semi-finals ==
Semi-final were played over two legs on 16 March and 6 April 2016. The round featured four winners from the quarter-final. The unseeded draw for semi-final pairings was held on 15 February.

15 March 2016
18:00

| Rijeka | 2–1 | Slaven Belupo |
|---|---|---|
| Bezjak 10'; Matei 15' | Report | Christensen 71' |

Stadion Rujevica, Rijeka
Attendance: 4,596
Referee: Mario Zebec (Cestica)
5 April 2016
17:30

| Slaven Belupo | 3–0 | Rijeka |
|---|---|---|
| Ejupi 43'; Ozobić 54'; Pokrivač 72' | Report |

Gradski stadion, Koprivnica
Attendance: 2,500
Referee: Damir Batinić (Osijek)

Slaven Belupo won 4–2 on aggregate.

16 March 2016
17:30

| Hajduk Split | 0–2 | Dinamo Zagreb |
|---|---|---|
| | Report | Soudani 23'; Ćorić 29' |

Stadion Poljud, Split
Attendance: 12,973
Referee: Damir Batinić (Osijek)
6 April 2016
17:30

| Dinamo Zagreb | 4–0 | Hajduk Split |
|---|---|---|
| Brekalo 2'; Fernandes 24', 50'; Soudani 67' | Report |

Stadion Maksimir, Zagreb
Attendance: 7,932
Referee: Ivan Bebek (Rijeka)

Dinamo Zagreb won 6–0 on aggregate.

== Final ==
The final was played over one leg on 10 May 2016 at Stadion Gradski vrt, Osijek.

10 May 2016
18:00

| Dinamo Zagreb | 2–1 | Slaven Belupo |
|---|---|---|
| Pjaca 31' (pen.); Rog 77' | Report | Ejupi 61' |

Stadion Gradski vrt, Osijek
Attendance: 2,282
Referee: Ante Vučemilović-Šimunović (Osijek)
