= 2020–21 NK Varaždin (2012) season =

NK Varaždin (2012)
2020–21 season
- Chairman: Stjepan Cvek
- Manager: Samir Toplak (until 7 December 2020); Zoran Kastel
- Stadium: Stadion Varteks
- Prva HNL: 10th (relegated)
- Croatian Cup: Round 2

The 2020–21 NK Varaždin (2012) season was the club's ninth season in existence and the second consecutive season in the top flight of Croatian football. In addition to the domestic league, Varaždin participated in this season's edition of the Croatian Cup. The season covered the period from 1 July 2020 to 30 June 2021.

== Current squad ==
As of 1 March 2021

Note: Flags indicate national team as defined under FIFA eligibility rules; some limited exceptions apply. Players may hold more than one non-FIFA nationality.

No.	Pos.	Nation	Player
1	GK	CRO	Oliver Zelenika
2	DF	CRO	Fran Cerovcec
4	MF	CRO	Jurica Grgec
5	DF	BIH	Kerim Memija
6	DF	CRO	Maks Čelić
7	MF	BIH	Demir Peco
8	MF	CRO	Igor Postonjski
9	FW	COL	Jorge Obregón
10	MF	CRO	Ivan Posavec
11	FW	CRO	Leon Benko
12	GK	CRO	Matija Kovačić
13	MF	CRO	Leonard Vuk
14	DF	JPN	Itsuki Urata
16	DF	CRO	Matej Senić
17	FW	CRO	Dominik Glavina

No.	Pos.	Nation	Player
18	MF	CRO	Matija Kolarić
19	FW	VEN	Andris Herrera
20	MF	CRO	Neven Đurasek (on loan from Dinamo Zagreb)
22	FW	CRO	Borna Petrović
23	DF	CRO	Ivan Novoselec
24	DF	CRO	Marko Stolnik
25	FW	CRO	Vinko Petković
30	DF	CRO	Nikola Tkalčić
32	DF	ALB	Jorgo Pëllumbi
44	MF	CMR	Jessie Guera Djou
55	FW	CRO	Gabrijel Boban
78	MF	MKD	Agon Elezi
99	GK	CRO	Dinko Horkaš (on loan from Dinamo Zagreb)
—	MF	CRO	Luka Mezga

== Transfers ==
=== In ===
Pos	Player	Transferred from	Fee	Date	Source
MF	(Croatia) Mijo Šabić	Croatia Zmijavci	Free	3 August 2020	
FW	(Croatia) Sven Golub	(Croatia) Podravina Ludbreg	Loan	6 August 2020	
FW	(Croatia) Dino Skorup	(Croatia) Hajduk Split	Loan	11 August 2020	
FW	(Croatia) Ivan Delić	(Croatia) Hajduk Split	Loan	11 August 2020	
DF	(Croatia) Jurica Grgec	(Armenia) Urartu	Free	12 August 2020	
DF	(Japan) Itsuki Urata	Free agent	Free	12 August 2020	
DF	(Croatia) Tin Hrvoj	(Croatia) Dinamo Zagreb	Loan	20 August 2020	
GK	(Croatia) Matija Kovačić	(Slovenia) Aluminij	Free	11 September 2020	
DF	(Bosnia and Herzegovina) Kerim Memija	(Denmark) Vejle	Free	11 September 2020	
DF	(Albania) Jorgo Pëllumbi	(Albania) Skënderbeu Korçë	Free	16 September 2020	
MF	(North Macedonia) Agon Elezi	(Albania) Skënderbeu Korçë	Free	16 September 2020	
DF	(Montenegro) Stefan Milić	(Croatia) Dinamo Zagreb	Loan	1 October 2020	
FW	(Croatia) Borna Petrović	(Austria) Hartberg	Free	14 October 2020	
GK	(Croatia) Dinko Horkaš	(Croatia) Dinamo Zagreb	Loan	16 October 2020	
FW	(Bosnia and Herzegovina) Demir Peco	(Bosnia and Herzegovina) Radnik Bijeljina	Free	16 October 2020	
DF	(Serbia) Damjan Daničić	(Croatia) Dinamo Zagreb	Loan	19 October 2020	
DF	(Croatia) Dominik Perković	(Croatia) Dubrava	End of loan	31 December 2020	
FW	(Croatia) Antonio Dedić	(Croatia) Orijent 1919	End of loan	31 December 2020	
FW	(Croatia) Leonard Vuk	(Croatia) Međimurje	End of loan	31 December 2020	
FW	(Ghana) Patrick Kesse	(Croatia) Podravina Ludbreg	End of loan	31 December 2020	
MF	(Croatia) Igor Postonjski	(Croatia) Zagorec Krapina	Free	18 January 2021	
DF	(Croatia) Maks Juraj Čelić	(Ukraine) FC Lviv	Free	21 January 2021	
FW	(Croatia) Matija Kanceljak	(Croatia) Zagorec Krapina	Free	21 January 2021	
DF	(Croatia) Hrvoje Crnčec	(Croatia) Podravina Ludbreg	Free	25 January 2021	
FW	(Croatia) Gabrijel Boban	Free agent	Free	2 February 2021	
FW	(Venezuela) Andris Herrera	(Venezuela) Yaracuyanos	Free	2 February 2021	

=== Out ===
Pos	Player	Transferred to	Fee	Date	Source
MF	(England) Hong Wan	(England) Wolverhampton Wanderers	End of loan	30 June 2020	
FW	(Croatia) Tomislav Turčin	(Croatia) Rijeka	End of loan	30 June 2020	
MF	(Croatia) Karlo Težak	Free agent	Released	1 July 2020	
MF	(Japan) Shohei Yokoyama	Free agent	Contract expired	1 July 2020	
MF	(Croatia) Duje Ninčević	(Croatia) Solin	Free	27 July 2020	
GK	(Croatia) Ante Mrmić	(Croatia) Tehničar Cvetkovec	Free	30 July 2020	
FW	(Austria) Dejan Šarac	Free agent	Released	1 August 2020	
DF	(Croatia) Hrvoje Crnčec	(Croatia) Podravina Ludbreg	Free	6 August 2020	
DF	(Croatia) Karlo Sambolec	(Croatia) Podravina Ludbreg	Free	6 August 2020	
GK	(Croatia) Ivan Nevistić	(Croatia) Rijeka	End of loan	9 August 2020	
DF	(Croatia) Petar Mamić	(Croatia) Rijeka	End of loan	9 August 2020	
MF	(Croatia) Tonio Teklić	(Croatia) Hajduk Split	End of loan	10 August 2020	
DF	(Croatia) Franjo Prce	(Croatia) Slaven Belupo	Free	11 August 2020	
DF	(Croatia) Matija Špičić	(Croatia) Ravnice	Free	17 August 2020	
DF	(Croatia) Denis Glavina	(Croatia) Međimurje	Free	27 August 2020	
DF	(Croatia) Matej Rodin	(Poland) Cracovia	€65,000	11 September 2020	
FW	(Croatia) Leonard Vuk	(Croatia) Međimurje	Loan	11 September 2020	
FW	(Croatia) Antonio Dedić	(Croatia) Orijent 1919	Loan	11 September 2020	
DF	(Croatia) Tin Hrvoj	(Croatia) Dinamo Zagreb	End of loan	28 September 2020	
FW	(Croatia) Kristian Fućak	(Croatia) Grobničan	Free	28 September 2020	
MF	(Saudi Arabia) Jamal Bajandouh	(Saudi Arabia) Al Shabab	Free	5 October 2020	
DF	(Croatia) Dominik Perković	(Croatia) Dubrava	Loan	14 October 2020	
FW	(Iran) Mehdi Mehdikhani	(Iran) Persepolis	€50,000	17 November 2020	
FW	(Croatia) Domagoj Drožđek	(Croatia) Lokomotiva Zagreb	End of loan	17 January 2021	
DF	(Serbia) Damjan Daničić	(Croatia) Dinamo Zagreb	End of loan	18 January 2021	
DF	(Montenegro) Stefan Milić	(Croatia) Dinamo Zagreb	End of loan	18 January 2021	
FW	(Croatia) Dino Skorup	(Croatia) Hajduk Split	End of loan	18 January 2021	
FW	(Croatia) Ivan Delić	(Croatia) Hajduk Split	End of loan	18 January 2021	
GK	(Croatia) Dinko Gavranović	(Croatia) Mladost Ždralovi	Loan	5 February 2021	
MF	(Croatia) Mijo Šabić	(Bosnia and Herzegovina) Široki Brijeg	Free	9 February 2021	
DF	(Croatia) Hrvoje Crnčec	(Croatia) Podravina Ludbreg	Loan	10 February 2021	
MF	(Croatia) Dejan Glavica	(Croatia) Polet Sveti Martin na Muri	Loan	15 February 2021	
FW	(Croatia) Antonio Dedić	(Croatia) Podravina Ludbreg	Loan	15 February 2021	
FW	(Croatia) Matija Kanceljak	(Croatia) Zagorec Krapina	Loan	15 February 2021	
FW	(Ghana) Patrick Kesse	(Croatia) Varteks	Loan	26 February 2021	
MF	(Croatia) Ivan Roca	(Croatia) Hrvatski Dragovoljac	Free	9 March 2021	

Total spending: ▼€0

Total income: ▲€115,000

Total expenditure: ▲€115,000

== Competitions ==
=== Overview ===
Competition	First match	Last match	Starting round	Final position	Record							
Competition	First match	Last match	Starting round	Final position	Pld	W	D	L	GF	GA	GD	Win %
HT Prva liga	14 August 2020	22 May 2021	Matchday 1	10th	36	6	10	20	30	61	−31	16.67
Croatian Cup	8 September 2020	16 December 2020	Preliminary round	Second round	3	2	0	1	8	2	+6	66.67
Total					39	8	10	21	38	63	−25	20.51

Source: Soccerway

=== HT Prva liga ===
==== League table ====
Pos	Team	Pld	W	D	L	GF	GA	GD	Pts	Qualification or relegation
6	Šibenik	36	9	8	19	32	47	−15	35	
7	Slaven Belupo	36	7	13	16	36	53	−17	34	
8	Lokomotiva	36	7	9	20	29	60	−31	30	
9	Istra 1961	36	7	8	21	27	52	−25	29	
10	Varaždin (R)	36	6	10	20	30	61	−31	28	Relegation for the Croatian Second Football League

Source: PrvaHNL.hr
Rules for classification: 1) Points; 2) Head-to-head points; 3) Head-to-head goal difference; 4) Head-to-head goals scored (at home if two teams tied); 5) Goal difference; 6) Goals scored; 7) Play-off
(Note: Criteria 2-4 and 7 is only used if deciding champion, teams to international competition or teams for relegation and in that case criteria 6 will not be used).
(R) Relegated

==== Results summary ====
Overall								Home						Away					
Pld	W	D	L	GF	GA	GD	Pts	W	D	L	GF	GA	GD	W	D	L	GF	GA	GD
36	6	10	20	30	61	−31	28	3	5	10	21	35	−14	3	5	10	9	26	−17

Source: Prva HNL

==== Results by round ====
Round	1	2	3	4	5	6	7	8	9	10	11	12	13	14	15	16	17	18	19	20	21	22	23	24	25	26	27	28	29	30	31	32	33	34	35	36
Ground	H	A	H	A	H	A	H	A	H	A	H	A	H	A	H	A	H	A	H	A	H	A	H	A	H	A	H	A	H	A	H	A	H	A	H	A
Result	L	W	D	W	L	L	L	L	L	L	L	D	D	L	W	L	W	L	W	D	L	W	L	L	L	L	D	D	D	L	D	D	L	D	L	L
Position	9	5	5	4	5	6	6	8	8	10	10	9	9	9	8	9	9	9	8	8	8	8	8	8	9	9	9	9	8	8	8	8	9	9	10	10

Source: Prva HNL
A = Away; H = Home; W = Win; D = Draw; L = Loss

==== Matches ====
The league fixtures were announced on 29 July 2020.

14 August 2020 1	Varaždin	1–5	Gorica	Varaždin
20:00 CEST (UTC+2)	Đurasek 62'	Report	Muhammed (yellow card) 10'; Kalik (yellow card) 22'; Ndiaye (yellow card) 28'; Špikić 38'; Steenvoorden (yellow card) 64'; Mudrinski 81', 90+4'; Doka 90'; Čanađija 90+1'	Stadium: Stadion Varteks; Attendance: 0 Referee: Duje Strukan

22 August 2020 2	Šibenik	0–1	Varaždin	Šibenik
20:05 CEST (UTC+2)		Report	Benko 89'	Stadium: Stadion Šubićevac; Attendance: 0 Referee: Tihomir Pejin

30 August 2020 3	Varaždin	1–1	Lokomotiva	Varaždin
17:55 CEST (UTC+2)	Mehdikhani 44'; Đurasek (yellow card) 62'; Delić (yellow card) 64'; Senić (yellow card) 77'	Report	Kallaku (yellow card) 22'; Rodin 49' (o.g.); Çokaj (yellow card) 86'	Stadium: Stadion Varteks; Attendance: 0 Referee: Igor Pajač

12 September 2020 4	Istra 1961	0–1	Varaždin	Pula
19:00 CEST (UTC+2)	Blagojević (yellow card) 25'; Guzina (yellow card) 57'; Galilea (yellow card) 83'; Hujber (yellow card) 86'	Report	Senić (yellow card) 5', (goal) 37'; Kolarić (yellow card) 64'	Stadium: Stadion Aldo Drosina; Attendance: 0 Referee: Duje Strukan

20 September 2020 5	Varaždin	0–1	Osijek	Varaždin
19:05 CEST (UTC+2)	Obregón (yellow card) 12'	Report	Žaper 15'; Majstorović (yellow card) 45+2'; Jugović (yellow card) 52'	Stadium: Stadion Varteks; Attendance: 1,437; Referee: Ivan Bebek

27 September 2020 6	Hajduk Split	2–0	Varaždin	Split
19:05 CEST (UTC+2)	Gyurcsó 5'; Jurić (yellow card) 37'; Caktaš 50' (pen.); Dimitrov (yellow card) 90'; Teklić (yellow card) 90+2'	Report	Pëllumbi (yellow card) 9', (red card) 15'; Zelenika (yellow card) 49'; Urata (yellow card) 69'; Mehdikhani (yellow card) 85'; Skorup (yellow card) 90'	Stadium: Stadion Poljud; Attendance: 3,340; Referee: Fran Jović

4 October 2020 7	Varaždin	1–2	Dinamo Zagreb	Varaždin
17:00 CEST (UTC+2)	Drožđek 8' (pen.); Elezi (yellow card) 19'; Stolnik (yellow card) 45+1'	Report	Lauritsen (yellow card) 6'; Leovac (yellow card) 24'; Oršić 45+1', 54'; Majer (yellow card) 90+2'	Stadium: Stadion Varteks; Attendance: 1,870; Referee: Dario Bel

17 October 2020 8	Rijeka	2–1	Varaždin	Rijeka
17:05 CEST (UTC+02:00)	Štefulj (yellow card) 12'; Stolnik 20' (o.g.); Kulenović 36'; Gnezda Čerin (yellow card) 60'; Lepinjica (yellow card) 90+2'	Report	Benko (yellow card) 14'; Obregón 17' (yellow card) 90'; Stolnik (yellow card) 45+2'; Urata (yellow card) 71'; Kolarić (yellow card) 90+5'	Stadium: Rujevica; Attendance: 2,072; Referee: Igor Pajač

23 October 2020 9	Varaždin	1–2	Slaven Belupo	Varaždin
18:00 CEST (UTC+02:00)	Milić (yellow card) 16'; Senić (yellow card) 35' (yellow-red card) 90+1'; Memija (yellow card) 70'; Petković 83'; Daničić (yellow card) 86'	Report	Krstanović 18'; Bačelić-Grgić (yellow card) 38' (goal) 50'; Božić (yellow card) 59'	Stadium: Stadion Varteks; Attendance: 727; Referee: Ante Čuljak

7 November 2020 11	Varaždin	1–3	Šibenik	Varaždin
15:00 CET (UTC+01:00)	Elezi (yellow card) 55'; Benko 70'	Report	Jurić 8' 26' 57'; Todoroski (yellow card) 64'	Stadium: Stadion Varteks; Attendance: 0 Referee: Marin Vidulin

20 November 2020 12	Lokomotiva	2–2	Varaždin	Zagreb
17:00 CET (UTC+01:00)	Chajia 10'; Tuci (yellow card) 46'; Petrak (yellow card) 58'; Papadopoulos 89'	Report	Delić 7'; Senić (yellow card) 52'; Hendija 60' (o.g.); Urata (yellow card) 73'	Stadium: Stadion Kranjčevićeva; Attendance: 0 Referee: Marko Matoc

23 November 2020 10	Gorica	1–0	Varaždin	Velika Gorica
18:00 CET (UTC+01:00)	Lovrić 20' (pen.); Kalik (yellow card) 37'; Hamad (yellow card) 57'	Report	Milić (yellow card) 61'; Đurasek (yellow card) 81'	Stadium: Stadion Radnik; Attendance: 0 Referee: Dario Kulušić

28 November 2020 13	Varaždin	1–1	Istra 1961	Varaždin
15:00 CET (UTC+1)	Obregón 51'; Benko (yellow card) 85'	Report	Blagojević (yellow card) 67'; Perera (yellow card) 81'; Bosančić (yellow card) 89'; Gržan 90+7' (pen.)	Stadium: Stadion Varteks; Attendance: 0 Referee: Igor Pajač

5 December 2020 14	Osijek	1–0	Varaždin	Osijek
15:00 CET (UTC+01:00)	Škorić (yellow card) 44'; Bohar 60'; Ivušić (yellow card) 90+2'	Report	Senić (yellow card) 28'; Grgec (yellow card) 66'; Đurasek (yellow card) 70'; Daničić (yellow card) 90'	Stadium: Gradski Vrt Stadium; Attendance: 0 Referee: Goran Pečarić

12 December 2020 15	Varaždin	4–2	Hajduk Split	Varaždin
17:05 CET (UTC+01:00)	Posavec 4'; Grgec 32'; Daničić (yellow card) 56'; Senić 58' (yellow card) 68'; Benko (yellow card) 73'; Horkaš (yellow card) 87'; Obregón 90+5'	Report	Dimitrov (yellow card) 44'; Caktaš 72' 78'; Jradi (yellow card) 81'	Stadium: Stadion Varteks; Attendance: 0 Referee: Ante Čuljak

19 December 2020 16	Dinamo Zagreb	4–0	Varaždin	Zagreb
17:05 CET (UTC+1)	Oršić 23'; Petković 31', 79' (pen.); Mišić (yellow card) 82'; Hajrović 90+1'	Report	Đurasek (yellow card) 71'	Stadium: Stadion Maksimir; Attendance: 0 Referee: Dario Kulušić

23 January 2021 17	Varaždin	2–1	Rijeka	Varaždin
15:00 CET (UTC+01:00)	Urata 3' (yellow card) 58'; Horkaš (yellow card) 17'; Postonjski (yellow card) 31'; Obregón 33'; Đurasek (yellow card) 65'	Report	Kulenović 80'	Stadium: Varteks; Attendance: 0 Referee: Ante Čuljak

29 January 2021 18	Slaven Belupo	2–0	Varaždin	Koprivnica
18:00 CET (UTC+01:00)	Glavčić 15'; Krstanović (yellow card) 31'; Lulić (yellow card) 44'; Knöll 45+1'	Report	Stolnik (yellow card) 14'; Benko (yellow card) 80'	Stadium: Gradski stadion Attendance: 0 Referee: Ivan Bebek

3 February 2021 19	Varaždin	2–1	Gorica	Varaždin
15:00 CET (UTC+01:00)	Senić (yellow card) 10'; Petković (yellow card) 19'; Obregón 76'; Boban 90'	Report	Lovrić 21'; Golubickas (yellow card) 89'	Stadium: Varteks; Attendance: 0 Referee: Damir Batinić

7 February 2021 20	Šibenik	0–0	Varaždin	Šibenik
15:00 CET (UTC+01:00)	Rak (yellow card) 67'	Report	Memija (yellow card) 33'; Elezi (yellow card) 58'	Stadium: Stadion Šubićevac; Attendance: 0 Referee: Fran Jović

12 February 2021 21	Varaždin	0–1	Lokomotiva	Varaždin
18:00 CET (UTC+01:00)	Boban (yellow card) 28'; Čelić (yellow card) 77'	Report	Lešković (yellow card) 10' (yellow-red card) 90+2'; Pivarić 29' (pen.); Marić (yellow card) 44'; Šimić (yellow card) 80'	Stadium: Varteks; Attendance: 0 Referee: Duje Strukan

20 February 2021 22	Istra 1961	0–1	Varaždin	Pula
15:00 CET (UTC+01:00)	Galilea (yellow card) 65'; Tomašević (yellow card) 87'	Report	Grgec (yellow card) 50'; Stolnik (red card) 58'; Obregón (yellow card) 70'; Senić 89'; Urata (yellow card) 90+2'; Herrera (yellow card) 90+5'	Stadium: Stadion Aldo Drosina; Attendance: 0 Referee: Fran Jović

26 February 2021 23	Varaždin	2–3	Osijek	Varaždin
18:00 CET (UTC+1)	Peco 16'; Herrera 21'; Pëllumbi (yellow card) 30'; Grgec (yellow card) 51'	Report	Lončar (yellow card) 8'; Miérez 52' (pen.), 78'; Santini 68'; Jugović (yellow card) 71'	Stadium: Stadion Varteks; Attendance: 0 Referee: Goran Pečarić

6 March 2021 24	Hajduk Split	2–0	Varaždin	Split
17:05 CET (UTC+1)	Čolina 8'; Memija 45+1' (o.g.); Livaja (yellow card) 45+3'; Jurić (yellow card) 50'; Fossati (yellow card) 74' (yellow-red card) 88'	Report	Pëllumbi (yellow card) 20'; Senić (yellow card) 42'; Guera Djou (yellow card) 86' (yellow-red card) 90+1'; Benko (yellow card) 89'	Stadium: Stadion Poljud; Attendance: 0 Referee: Igor Pajač

14 March 2021 25	Varaždin	0–5	Dinamo Zagreb	Varaždin
15:00 CET (UTC+1)	Senić (yellow card) 32'; Đurasek (yellow card) 75'	Report	Atiemwen 7'; Mišić 16'; Gavranović 25'; Franjić (yellow card) 67'; Oršić 70' 78'	Stadium: Stadion Varteks; Attendance: 0 Referee: Ivan Bebek

21 March 2021 26	Rijeka	2–0	Varaždin	Rijeka
15:00 CET (UTC+1)	Galović 22' 35'; Capan (yellow card) 43'	Report		Stadium: Rujevica; Attendance: 0 Referee: Igor Pajač

2 April 2021 27	Varaždin	1–1	Slaven Belupo	Varaždin
18:00 CEST (UTC+02:00)	Čelić (yellow card) 32'; Đurasek 42'	Report	H. Kim (yellow card) 26'; Delić 90+1'	Stadium: Stadion Varteks; Attendance: 0 Referee: Dario Bel

10 April 2021 28	Gorica	0–0	Varaždin	Velika Gorica
17:00 CEST (UTC+02:00)	Moro (yellow card) 20'; Babec (yellow card) 41'; Dvorneković (yellow card) 46'; Kalik (yellow card) 73'; Krizmanić (yellow card) 79'	Report	Guera Djou (yellow card) 87'	Stadium: Stadion Radnik; Attendance: 0 Referee: Zdenko Lovrić

16 April 2021 29	Varaždin	1–1	Šibenik	Varaždin
16:00 CEST (UTC+02:00)	Đurasek 11'; Kolarić (yellow card) 67'; Benko (yellow card) 85'	Report	Mesa (yellow card) 34'; Jurić 75' (pen.); Mina (yellow card) 84'; Laća (yellow card) 90+1'; Pajić (yellow card) 90+4'	Stadium: Stadion Varteks; Attendance: 0 Referee: Zdenko Lovrić

21 April 2021 30	Lokomotiva	4–0	Varaždin	Zagreb
16:00 CEST (UTC+02:00)	Maleš 3'; Papadopoulos 32'; Marić (yellow card) 83'; Šimić 84' (pen.) (yellow card) 84' (goal) 86'	Report	Pëllumbi (yellow card) 74'	Stadium: Stadion Kranjčevićeva; Attendance: 0 Referee: Tihomir Pejin

26 April 2021 31	Varaždin	1–1	Istra 1961	Varaždin
18:00 CEST (UTC+02:00)	Guera Djou (yellow card) 27' (yellow-red card) 81'; Posavec 34'; Peco (yellow card) 45'; Senić (yellow card) 88'	Report	Hara 18' (yellow card) 30'; Levitt (yellow card) 72'; Galilea (yellow card) 83'	Stadium: Stadion Varteks; Attendance: 0 Referee: Dario Bel

2 May 2021 32	Osijek	1–1	Varaždin	Osijek
19:05 CEST (UTC+02:00)	Igor Silva (yellow card) 58'; Cheberko (yellow card) 62'; Miérez 74'; Lyopa (yellow card) 77'	Report	Posavec (yellow card) 38'; Vuk (yellow card) 63'; Obregón 69'; Čelić (yellow card) 79'	Stadium: Gradski Vrt Stadium; Attendance: 0 Referee: Dario Kulušić

9 May 2021 33	Varaždin	0–1	Hajduk Split	Varaždin
17:00 CEST (UTC+2)	Senić (yellow card) 53'; Posavec (yellow card) 56'; Postonjski (yellow card) 75'; Horkaš (yellow card) 89'	Report	Simić (yellow card) 68'; Livaja 89' (pen.); Jairo (yellow card) 90+1'; Kalinić (yellow card) 90+4'	Stadium: Stadion Varteks; Attendance: 0 Referee: Zdenko Lovrić

12 May 2021 34	Dinamo Zagreb	2–2	Varaždin	Zagreb
18:05 CEST (UTC+2)	Ivanušec 9'; Perić 40'; Tolić (yellow card) 72'; Čabraja (yellow card) 80'	Report	Elezi (yellow card) 32', (goal) 34'; Herrera 59'; Novoselec (yellow card) 67'; Senić (yellow card) 77'; Pëllumbi (yellow card) 80'; Zelenika (yellow card) 90+3'	Stadium: Stadion Maksimir; Attendance: 0 Referee: Dario Kulušić

16 May 2021 35	Varaždin	2–3	Rijeka	Varaždin
15:00 CEST (UTC+02:00)	Obregón (yellow card) 19' (goal) 34'; Novoselec 84'	Report	(yellow card) 53' Lončar; 62' Menalo; 67' Capan; 79' Drmić	Stadium: Varteks; Attendance: Behind closed doors Referee: Igor Pajač (Sveti Ivan Zelina)

22 May 2021 36	Slaven Belupo	1–0	Varaždin	Koprivnica
17:00 CEST (UTC+02:00)	Zvonarek 88'	Report		Stadium: Gradski stadion Attendance: 0 Referee: Ivan Bebek

=== Croatian Football Cup ===
8 September 2020 PR	Bjelovar	0–5	Varaždin	Bjelovar
16:00 CEST (UTC+02:00)	Kosanović (yellow card) 70'; Nreca (yellow card) 85'	Report	Mehdikhani 7'; Renić 13' (o.g.); Delić 32'; Grgec 37'; Benko 76'	Stadium: Gradski stadion Bjelovar; Attendance: 0 Referee: Ante Čuljak

10 October 2020 R1	Varaždin	2–0	Cibalia	Varaždin
19:00 CEST (UTC+02:00)	Delić (yellow card) 44'; Obregón 65'; Drožđek 81'	Report	Baltić (yellow card) 35'; Oršolić (yellow card) 36'; Miljanić (yellow card) 79'	Stadium: Varteks; Attendance: 529; Referee: Marko Matoc

16 December 2020 R2	Varaždin	1–2	Rijeka	Varaždin
16:00 CET (UTC+01:00)	Posavec 39' (yellow card) 77'; Stolnik (yellow card) 41'; Đurasek (yellow card) 45+2'; Zelenika (yellow card) 85'	Report	Lončar (yellow card) 60'; Galović 78'; Štefulj (yellow card) 87'; Menalo 90+2'	Stadium: Varteks; Attendance: 0 Referee: Zdenko Lovrić

== Player seasonal records ==
Updated 3 May 2021

=== Goals ===
Rank	Name	League	Cup	Total
1	(Colombia) Jorge Obregón	6	1	7
2	(Croatia) Neven Đurasek	3	-	3
2	(Croatia) Matej Senić	3	-	3
2	(Croatia) Leon Benko	2	1	3
2	(Croatia) Ivan Posavec	2	1	3
6	(Croatia) Ivan Delić	1	1	2
6	(Croatia) Domagoj Drožđek	1	1	2
6	(Croatia) Jurica Grgec	1	1	2
6	(Iran) Mehdi Mehdikhani	1	1	2
10	(Croatia) Gabrijel Boban	1	-	1
10	(Venezuela) Andris Herrera	1	-	1
10	(Bosnia and Herzegovina) Demir Peco	1	-	1
10	(Croatia) Vinko Petković	1	-	1
10	(Japan) Itsuki Urata	1	-	1
Own goals		1	1	2
TOTALS		26	8	34

Source: Competitive matches

=== Clean sheets ===
Rank	Name	League	Cup	Total
1	(Croatia) Dinko Horkaš	3	-	3
1	(Croatia) Oliver Zelenika	2	1	3
3	(Croatia) Luka Šteko	-	1	1
TOTALS		4	2	6

Source: Competitive matches

=== Disciplinary record ===
Number	Position	Player	1. HNL			Croatian Cup			Total		
Number	Position	Player	Yellow card	(yellow card) (yellow-red card)	Red card	Yellow card	(yellow card) (yellow-red card)	Red card	Yellow card	(yellow card) (yellow-red card)	Red card
1	GK	(Croatia) Oliver Zelenika	1	0	0	1	0	0	2	0	0
4	MF	(Croatia) Jurica Grgec	3	0	0	0	0	0	3	0	0
5	DF	(Bosnia and Herzegovina) Kerim Memija	2	0	0	0	0	0	2	0	0
6	DF	(Croatia) Maks Juraj Čelić	3	0	0	0	0	0	3	0	0
6	MF	(Croatia) Dino Skorup	1	0	0	0	0	0	1	0	0
7	MF	(Bosnia and Herzegovina) Demir Peco	1	0	0	0	0	0	1	0	0
8	MF	(Croatia) Igor Postonjski	1	0	0	0	0	0	1	0	0
9	FW	(Colombia) Jorge Obregón	3	0	0	0	0	0	3	0	0
10	MF	(Croatia) Ivan Posavec	1	0	0	1	0	0	2	0	0
11	FW	(Croatia) Leon Benko	7	0	0	0	0	0	7	0	0
13	MF	(Croatia) Leonard Vuk	1	0	0	0	0	0	1	0	0
14	DF	(Japan) Itsuki Urata	5	0	0	0	0	0	5	0	0
16	DF	(Croatia) Matej Senić	9	1	0	0	0	0	9	1	0
17	FW	(Croatia) Ivan Delić	1	0	0	1	0	0	2	0	0
18	MF	(Croatia) Matija Kolarić	3	0	0	0	0	0	3	0	0
19	FW	(Venezuela) Andris Herrera	1	0	0	0	0	0	1	0	0
20	MF	(Croatia) Neven Đurasek	6	0	0	1	0	0	7	0	0
24	DF	(Croatia) Marko Stolnik	4	0	1	1	0	0	5	0	1
25	FW	(Croatia) Vinko Petković	1	0	0	0	0	0	1	0	0
32	DF	(Albania) Jorgo Pëllumbi	4	0	1	0	0	0	4	0	1
33	DF	(Serbia) Damjan Daničić	3	0	0	0	0	0	3	0	0
44	MF	(Cameroon) Jessie Guera Djou	1	2	0	0	0	0	1	2	0
55	FW	(Croatia) Gabrijel Boban	1	0	0	0	0	0	1	0	0
55	DF	(Montenegro) Stefan Milić	2	0	0	0	0	0	2	0	0
77	FW	(Iran) Mehdi Mehdikhani	1	0	0	0	0	0	1	0	0
78	MF	(North Macedonia) Agon Elezi	3	0	0	0	0	0	3	0	0
99	GK	(Croatia) Dinko Horkaš	2	0	0	0	0	0	2	0	0
TOTALS			71	3	2	5	0	0	76	3	2

=== Appearances and goals ===
Number	Position	Player	Apps	Goals	Apps	Goals	Apps	Goals
Number	Position	Player	Total		1. HNL		Croatian Cup	
1	GK	(Croatia) Oliver Zelenika	15	0	12+1	0	2+0	0
2	DF	(Croatia) Fran Cerovčec	1	0	0+1	0	0+0	0
4	MF	(Croatia) Jurica Grgec	19	2	9+9	1	1+0	1
5	DF	(Bosnia and Herzegovina) Kerim Memija	23	0	19+3	0	1+0	0
6	DF	(Croatia) Maks Juraj Čelić	14	0	11+3	0	0+0	0
6	MF	(Croatia) Dino Skorup	10	0	2+6	0	2+0	0
7	MF	(Bosnia and Herzegovina) Demir Peco	15	1	10+5	1	0+0	0
8	MF	(Croatia) Luka Mezga	1	0	0+1	0	0+0	0
8	MF	(Croatia) Igor Postonjski	16	0	14+2	0	0+0	0
9	FW	(Croatia) Domagoj Drožđek	15	2	12+1	1	2+0	1
9	FW	(Colombia) Jorge Obregón	33	7	28+2	6	3+0	1
10	MF	(Croatia) Ivan Posavec	27	3	15+9	2	2+1	1
11	FW	(Croatia) Leon Benko	27	3	6+19	2	1+1	1
13	MF	(Croatia) Leonard Vuk	7	0	1+6	0	0+0	0
14	DF	(Japan) Itsuki Urata	23	1	20+1	1	2+0	0
15	MF	(Croatia) Mijo Šabić	4	0	1+1	0	1+1	0
16	DF	(Croatia) Matej Senić	28	3	22+4	3	1+1	0
17	FW	(Croatia) Ivan Delić	15	2	6+7	1	2+0	1
17	FW	(Croatia) Dominik Glavina	4	0	1+3	0	0+0	0
18	MF	(Croatia) Matija Kolarić	19	0	6+11	0	0+2	0
19	FW	(Venezuela) Andris Herrera	12	1	6+6	1	0+0	0
20	MF	(Croatia) Neven Đurasek	30	3	28+0	3	1+1	0
21	GK	(Croatia) Luka Šteko	1	0	0+0	0	1+0	0
22	FW	(Croatia) Borna Petrović	5	0	0+5	0	0+0	0
22	DF	(Croatia) Matej Rodin	2	0	2+0	0	0+0	0
23	DF	(Croatia) Ivan Novoselec	7	0	3+3	0	1+0	0
24	DF	(Croatia) Marko Stolnik	27	0	21+3	0	3+0	0
25	FW	(Croatia) Vinko Petković	22	1	8+12	1	0+2	0
26	MF	(Croatia) Leon Belcar	1	0	0+0	0	0+1	0
30	DF	(Croatia) Nikola Tkalčić	23	0	18+3	0	2+0	0
32	DF	(Albania) Jorgo Pëllumbi	23	0	21+0	0	2+0	0
33	DF	(Serbia) Damjan Daničić	6	0	3+2	0	1+0	0
44	MF	(Cameroon) Jessie Guera Djou	8	0	5+3	0	0+0	0
55	FW	(Croatia) Gabrijel Boban	9	1	6+3	1	0+0	0
55	DF	(Montenegro) Stefan Milić	7	0	5+1	0	0+1	0
77	MF	(Croatia) Karlo Lusavec	3	0	0+2	0	0+1	0
77	FW	(Iran) Mehdi Mehdikhani	7	2	5+1	1	1+0	1
78	MF	(North Macedonia) Agon Elezi	13	0	6+6	0	1+0	0
99	GK	(Croatia) Dinko Horkaš	20	0	20+0	0	0+0	0
