= 2022–23 GNK Dinamo Zagreb season =

Dinamo Zagreb
2022–23 season
- President: Mirko Barišić
- Head coach: Ante Čačić (until 5 April); Igor Bišćan (from 5 April)
- Stadium: Stadion Maksimir
- HNL: 1st
- Croatian Cup: Semi-finals
- Croatian Super Cup: Winners
- UEFA Champions League: Group stage
- Top goalscorer: League: Luka Ivanušec (12); All: Josip Drmić; Bruno Petković (14 each)
Home colours	Away colours

The 2022–23 season was the 112th season in the existence of GNK Dinamo Zagreb and the club's 32nd consecutive season in the top flight of Croatian football. In addition to the domestic league, Dinamo Zagreb participated in this season's editions of the Croatian Cup, the Croatian Super Cup and the UEFA Champions League.

== Players ==
=== First-team squad ===
As of 31 August 2022

Note: Flags indicate national team as defined under FIFA eligibility rules; some limited exceptions apply. Players may hold more than one non-FIFA nationality.

No.	Pos.	Nation	Player
1	GK	CRO	Danijel Zagorac
2	DF	IRI	Sadegh Moharrami
3	DF	CRO	Daniel Štefulj
4	DF	CRO	Boško Šutalo
5	MF	MKD	Arijan Ademi (captain)
6	DF	DEN	Rasmus Lauritsen
7	MF	CRO	Luka Ivanušec
9	FW	CRO	Bruno Petković
10	MF	CRO	Martin Baturina
11	FW	AZE	Mahir Emreli
12	DF	CRO	Petar Bočkaj
13	DF	MKD	Stefan Ristovski

No.	Pos.	Nation	Player
14	MF	AUT	Robert Ljubičić
18	FW	SUI	Josip Drmić
27	MF	CRO	Josip Mišić
28	DF	FRA	Kévin Théophile-Catherine
31	MF	CRO	Marko Bulat
32	GK	CRO	Nikola Čavlina
33	GK	CRO	Ivan Nevistić
37	DF	CRO	Josip Šutalo
40	GK	CRO	Dominik Livaković (vice-captain)
55	DF	CRO	Dino Perić
70	FW	BIH	Luka Menalo
77	FW	CRO	Dario Špikić

As of 20 August 2022 after match against (Croatia) NK Osijek

Squad no.	Name	Nat.	Pos.	Date of birth	Signed from	Apps	Goals
Goalkeepers
1	Danijel Zagorac	(Croatia)	GK	7 February 1987 (aged 35)	(Croatia) Split	63	0
12	Nikola Čavlina	(Croatia)	GK	2 June 2002 (aged 20)	Youth Academy	0	0
33	Ivan Nevistić	(Croatia)	GK	31 July 1998 (aged 23)	(Croatia) Rijeka	0	0
40	Dominik Livaković (vice-captain)	(Croatia)	GK	9 January 1995 (aged 27)	(Croatia) Zagreb	246	0
Defenders
2	Sadegh Moharrami	(Iran)	RB	1 March 1996 (aged 26)	(Iran) Persepolis	82	0
3	Daniel Štefulj	(Croatia)	LB	8 November 1999 (aged 22)	(Croatia) Rijeka	15	0
4	Boško Šutalo	(Croatia)	CB	1 January 2000 (aged 22)	(Italy) Atalanta	5	1
6	Rasmus Lauritsen	(Denmark)	CB	27 February 1996 (aged 26)	(Sweden) Norrköping	75	2
12	Petar Bočkaj	(Croatia)	LB	23 July 1996 (aged 25)	(Croatia) Osijek	23	3
13	Stefan Ristovski	(North Macedonia)	RB	12 February 1992 (aged 30)	(Portugal) Sporting CP	70	1
28	Kévin Théophile-Catherine	(France)	CB	28 October 1989 (aged 32)	(France) Saint-Étienne	143	3
37	Josip Šutalo	(Croatia)	CB	28 February 2000 (aged 22)	Youth Academy	46	3
55	Dino Perić	(Croatia)	CB	12 July 1994 (aged 27)	(Croatia) Lokomotiva	131	10
Midfielders
5	Arijan Ademi (captain)	(North Macedonia)	CM	29 May 1991 (aged 31)	(Croatia) Šibenik	350	39
7	Luka Ivanušec	(Croatia)	AM	26 November 1998 (aged 23)	(Croatia) Lokomotiva	131	19
10	Martin Baturina	(Croatia)	AM	16 February 2003 (aged 19)	Youth Academy	29	4
14	Robert Ljubičić	(Austria)	CM	14 July 1999 (aged 22)	(Austria) Rapid Wien	10	0
27	Josip Mišić	(Croatia)	CM	28 June 1994 (aged 27)	(Portugal) Sporting CP	84	5
31	Marko Bulat	(Croatia)	CM	26 September 2001 (aged 20)	(Croatia) Šibenik	20	1
Forwards
9	Bruno Petković	(Croatia)	FW	16 September 1994 (aged 27)	(Italy) Bologna	177	54
11	Mahir Emreli	(Azerbaijan)	RW	1 July 1997 (aged 24)	(Poland) Legia Warsaw	13	3
18	Josip Drmić	(Switzerland)	FW	8 August 1992 (aged 29)	(England) Norwich City	11	4
70	Luka Menalo	(Bosnia and Herzegovina)	LW	22 July 1996 (aged 25)	(Bosnia and Herzegovina) Široki Brijeg	58	7
77	Dario Špikić	(Croatia)	RW	22 March 1999 (aged 23)	(Croatia) Gorica	40	4

== Transfers ==
=== In ===
No.	Pos	Player	Transferred from	Fee	Date	Source
18	FW	(Switzerland) Josip Drmić	(England) Norwich City	Free	7 June 2022	
14	MF	(Austria) Robert Ljubičić	(Austria) Rapid Wien	€2.0 million	13 June 2022	
4	DF	(Croatia) Boško Šutalo	(Italy) Atalanta	€4.0 million	21 June 2022	
23	MF	(Croatia) Marko Brkljača	(Croatia) Hajduk Split	Free	1 July 2022	

=== Loan returnees ===
No.	Pos	Player	Transferred from	Fee	Date	Source
77	FW	(Croatia) Sandro Kulenović	(Croatia) Lokomotiva	Free	1 June 2022	
33	GK	(Croatia) Ivan Nevistić	(Croatia) Lokomotiva	Free	1 June 2022	
7	FW	(Croatia) Antonio Marin	(Croatia) Šibenik	Free	1 June 2022	
25	FW	(Croatia) Mario Ćuže	(Ukraine) Dnipro-1	Free	1 June 2022	

=== Out ===
No.	Pos	Player	Transferred to	Fee	Date	Source
6	DF	(Portugal) Ivo Pinto	(Netherlands) Fortuna Sittard	Free	4 June 2022	
29	DF	(Switzerland) François Moubandje	(Switzerland) Sion	Free	4 June 2022	
30	DF	(Slovenia) Petar Stojanović	(Italy) Empoli	€ 1.2 million	17 June 2022	
38	DF	(Croatia) Bartol Franjić	(Germany) VfL Wolfsburg	€ 7.5 million	26 June 2022	
80	MF	(Nigeria) Iyayi Atiemwen	(Moldova) Sheriff Tiraspol	Undisclosed	29 June 2022	
19	DF	(Croatia) Marijan Čabraja	(Scotland) Hibernian	Free	11 July 2022	
9	FW	(Serbia) Komnen Andrić	(France) Clermont	€ 1.0 million	15 July 2022	
8	MF	(Bosnia and Herzegovina) Amer Gojak	(Hungary) Ferencváros	€ 1.0 million	31 August 2022	
66	DF	(Austria) Emir Dilaver	(Croatia) HNK Rijeka	Free	8 December 2022	
99	FW	(Croatia) Mislav Oršić	(England) Southampton	€ 6.8 million	6 January 2023	

=== Loan out ===
No.	Pos	Player	Transferred to	Fee	Date	Source
	MF	(Croatia) Niko Janković	(Bosnia and Herzegovina) Zrinjski Mostar	Free	21 January 2022	
77	FW	(Croatia) Sandro Kulenović	(Croatia) Lokomotiva	Free	16 June 2022	
92	FW	(Croatia) Jakov-Anton Vasilj	(Croatia) Lokomotiva	Free	16 June 2022	
25	FW	(Croatia) Mario Ćuže	(Bosnia and Herzegovina) Zrinjski Mostar	Free	1 July 2022	
90	FW	(Croatia) Duje Čop	(Croatia) Šibenik	Free	22 June 2022	
35	MF	(Croatia) Ivan Šaranić	(Slovenia) Bravo	Free	22 June 2022	
4	DF	(Montenegro) Stefan Milić	(Slovenia) Bravo	Free	25 June 2022	
39	FW	(Australia) Deni Jurić	(Croatia) Gorica	Free	11 July 2022	
24	MF	(Croatia) Marko Tolić	(Slovenia) Maribor	Free	26 August 2022	
	FW	(Croatia) Bartol Barišić	(Slovenia) Domžale	Free	1 September 2022	
20	FW	(Croatia) Antonio Marin	(Croatia) HNK Rijeka	Free	7 December 2022	
39	FW	(Australia) Deni Jurić	(Croatia) HNK Rijeka	Free	9 December 2022	

== Pre-season and friendlies ==
Win Draw Loss Fixtures

26 June 2022 Friendly	Shkëndija (North Macedonia)	0–3	(Croatia) Dinamo Zagreb	Lendava, Slovenia
18:00 CEST (UTC+2)		Report	Drmić 16'; Andrić 54'; Petković 81'	Stadium: Športni park Lendava

28 June 2022 Friendly	Nafta 1903 (Slovenia)	0–3	(Croatia) Dinamo Zagreb	Lendava, Slovenia
18:00 CEST (UTC+2)		Report	Andrić 41'; Ljubičić 68'; Emreli 83'	Stadium: Športni park Lendava

1 July 2022 Friendly	Spartak Trnava (Slovakia)	3–3	(Croatia) Dinamo Zagreb	Lendava, Slovenia
18:00 CEST (UTC+2)	Ristovski 29'; Štefanik 31'; Koštrna 34'	Report	Menalo 38'; Petković 49'; Emreli 90'	Stadium: Športni park Lendava

6 July 2022 Friendly	Dinamo Zagreb (Croatia)	5–1	(Montenegro) Arsenal Tivat	Zagreb, Croatia
20:00 CEST (UTC+2)	Oršić 34'; Ivanušec 50'; Ljubičić 80'; Špikić 84'; Jurić 90'	Report	Montenegro 35'	Stadium: Stadion Maksimir

== Competitions ==
=== Overall record ===
Competition	First match	Last match	Starting round	Final position	Record							
Competition	First match	Last match	Starting round	Final position	Pld	W	D	L	GF	GA	GD	Win %
HNL	15 July 2022	28 May 2023	Matchday 1	Winners	36	24	9	3	81	28	+53	66.67
Croatian Cup	27 September 2022	5 April 2023	Round of 32	Semi-finals	4	3	0	1	11	4	+7	75.00
Croatian Super Cup	9 July 2022		Final	Winners	1	0	1	0	0	0	+0	0.00
UEFA Champions League	19 July 2022	2 November 2022	Second qualifying round	Group stage	12	5	2	5	16	18	−2	41.67
Total					53	32	12	9	108	50	+58	60.38

Source: Soccerway

=== Croatian Super Cup ===
9 July 2022 Final	GNK Dinamo Zagreb	0–0 (4–1 p)	Hajduk Split	Zagreb
20:00 UTC+2		Report		Stadium: Stadion Maksimir; Attendance: 16,532; Referee: Igor Pajač
	Penalties
	Petković (penalty scored); Oršić (penalty scored); Ljubičić (penalty scored); Ivanušec (penalty scored)		(penalty scored) Livaja; (penalty missed) Mlakar; (penalty missed) Vuković

=== HNL ===
==== League table ====
Pos	Team	Pld	W	D	L	GF	GA	GD	Pts	Qualification or relegation
1	Dinamo Zagreb (C)	36	24	9	3	81	28	+53	81	Qualification for the Champions League second qualifying round
2	Hajduk Split	36	21	8	7	65	41	+24	71	Qualification to Europa Conference League third qualifying round (Note: Hajduk qualified for the Europa Conference League third qualifying round by winning the 2022–23 Croatian Football Cup.)
3	Osijek	36	13	11	12	46	41	+5	50	Qualification to Europa Conference League second qualifying round
4	Rijeka	36	14	7	15	44	44	0	49	Qualification to Europa Conference League second qualifying round
5	Istra 1961	36	11	13	12	36	38	−2	46	

Source: SuperSport HNL
Rules for classification: 1) Points; 2) Head-to-head points; 3) Head-to-head goal difference; 4) Head-to-head goals scored (at home if two teams tied); 5) Goal difference; 6) Goals scored; 7) Play-off
(Note: Criteria 2-4 and 7 is only used if deciding champion, teams to international competition or teams for relegation and in that case criteria 6 will not be used).
(C) Champions

==== Results summary ====
Overall								Home						Away					
Pld	W	D	L	GF	GA	GD	Pts	W	D	L	GF	GA	GD	W	D	L	GF	GA	GD
36	24	9	3	81	28	+53	81	16	2	0	52	12	+40	8	7	3	29	16	+13

Source: Prva HNL

==== Results by round ====
15 July 2022 1	Dinamo Zagreb	3–2	Lokomotiva	Zagreb
18:55 CEST (UTC+2)	Drmić 26'; Drmić 34'; Menalo 91'	Report	Kulenović 4'; Aliyu 22'	Stadium: Stadion Maksimir; Attendance: 4320; Referee: Dario Bel

23 July 2022 2	Slaven Belupo	1–5	Dinamo Zagreb	Koprivnica
18:55 CEST (UTC+2)	Marina 2'	Report	Baturina 7'; Oršić 15'; Drmić 19'; Mišić 74'; Špikić 90'	Stadium: Gradski stadion (Koprivnica); Attendance: 2613; Referee: Patrik Kolarić

29 July 2022 3	Dinamo Zagreb	4–1	Istra	Zagreb
21:00 CEST (UTC+2)	Oršić 11' (pen.); B. Šutalo 32'; Bočkaj 80'; Emreli 88'	Report	Bakrar 84'	Stadium: Stadion Maksimir; Attendance: 3393; Referee: Igor Pajač

5 August 2022 4	Varaždin	1–1	Dinamo Zagreb	Varaždin
20:00 CEST (UTC+2)	Šego 63'; Peco (yellow card) 36'; Postonjski (yellow card) 68'; Herrera (yellow card) 83'	Report	Špikić 45'; Lauritsen (yellow card) 53'	Stadium: Stadion Varteks; Attendance: 7,132; Referee: Duje Strukan

13 August 2022 5	Dinamo Zagreb	4–1	Hajduk	Zagreb
21:05 CEST (UTC+2)	Baturina 61'; Ademi 64'; Baturina (yellow card) 81'; Gojak 84'; Oršić 90'	Report	Grgić (yellow card) 16'; Atanasov 45'; Atanasov (yellow card) 45'; Livaja (yellow card) 59'	Stadium: Stadion Maksimir; Attendance: 14,031; Referee: Dario Bel

20 August 2022 6	Dinamo Zagreb	5–2	Osijek	Zagreb
21:05 CEST (UTC+2)	Oršić 3'; Petković (yellow card) 40' (goal) 53'; Perić 66', 82'; Jurčević 90+3' (o.g.)	Report	Beljo 29'; Kleinheisler 74'	Stadium: Stadion Maksimir; Attendance: 5,168; Referee: Patrik Kolarić

=== UEFA Champions League ===
==== Qualifying rounds ====
===== Second qualifying round =====
19 July 2022 First leg	Dinamo Zagreb (Croatia)	2–2	(North Macedonia) Shkupi	Zagreb, Croatia
21:00 CEST (UTC+2)	Ademi 44'; Petković 86'	Report	Queven 25'; Cephas 89'	Stadium: Maksimir; Attendance: 8,000; Referee: Radu Petrescu (Romania)

26 July 2022 Second leg	Shkupi (North Macedonia)	0–1 (2–3 agg.)	(Croatia) Dinamo Zagreb	Skopje, North Macedonia
21:00 CEST (UTC+2)		Report	Ademi 47'	Stadium: Toše Proeski Arena; Attendance: 12,500; Referee: Jakob Kehlet (Denmark)
Note: Dinamo Zagreb won 3–2 on aggregate.

===== Third qualifying round =====
2 August 2022 First leg	Ludogorets (Bulgaria)	1–2	(Croatia) Dinamo Zagreb	Razgrad, Bulgaria
20:45 EEST (UTC+3)	Tekpetey 22'	Report	Perić 6'; Padt 9' (o.g.)	Stadium: Ludogorets Arena; Attendance: 7,505; Referee: Cüneyt Çakır (Turkey)

9 August 2022 Second leg	Dinamo Zagreb (Croatia)	4–2 (6–3 agg.)	(Bulgaria) Ludogorets	Zagreb, Croatia
20:00 CEST (UTC+2)	Drmić 12'; Oršić 27' (pen.), 44'; Petković 87' (pen.)	Report	Despodov 45+4', 49' (pen.)	Stadium: Maksimir; Attendance: 13,658; Referee: Benoît Bastien (France)
Note: Dinamo Zagreb won 6–3 on aggregate.

===== Play off round =====
16 August 2022 First leg	Bodø/Glimt (Norway)	1–0	(Croatia) Dinamo Zagreb	Bodø, Norway
21:00 CEST (UTC+2)	Pellegrino 37'	Report		Stadium: Aspmyra Stadion; Attendance: 7,762; Referee: Danny Makkelie (Netherlands)

24 August 2022 Second leg	Dinamo Zagreb (Croatia)	4–1 (a.e.t.) (4–2 agg.)	(Norway) Bodø/Glimt	Zagreb, Croatia
21:00 CEST (UTC+2)	Oršić 4'; Petković 35'; Drmić 117'; Bočkaj 120'	Report	Grønbæk 70'	Stadium: Maksimir; Attendance: 18,349; Referee: Antonio Mateu Lahoz (Spain)
Note: Dinamo Zagreb won 4–2 on aggregate.

==== Group stage ====
The draw for the group stage was held on 25 August 2022.

Pos	Team	Pld	W	D	L	GF	GA	GD	Pts	Qualification	CHE	MIL	SAL	DZG
1	(England) Chelsea	6	4	1	1	10	4	+6	13	Advance to knockout phase	—	3–0	1–1	2–1
2	(Italy) Milan	6	3	1	2	12	7	+5	10	Advance to knockout phase	0–2	—	4–0	3–1
3	(Austria) Red Bull Salzburg	6	1	3	2	5	9	−4	6	Transfer to Europa League	1–2	1–1	—	1–0
4	(Croatia) Dinamo Zagreb	6	1	1	4	4	11	−7	4		1–0	0–4	1–1	—

Source: UEFA
Rules for classification: Group stage tiebreakers

6 September 2022 1	Dinamo Zagreb (Croatia)	1–0	(England) Chelsea	Zagreb, Croatia
18:45 CEST (UTC+2)	Oršić 13'; Baturina (yellow card) 90+6'	Report	Mount (yellow card) 59'; Koulibaly (yellow card) 67'	Stadium: Maksimir; Attendance: 20,607; Referee: István Kovács (Romania)

14 September 2022 2	Milan (Italy)	3–1	(Croatia) Dinamo Zagreb	Milan, Italy
18:45 CEST (UTC+2)	Giroud 45' (pen.); Saelemaekers 47'; Pobega 77'	Report	Oršić 56', (yellow card) 74'; Marin (yellow card) 90'	Stadium: San Siro; Attendance: 61,341; Referee: Jesús Gil Manzano (Spain)

5 October 2022 3	Red Bull Salzburg (Austria)	1–0	(Croatia) Dinamo Zagreb	Salzburg, Austria
18:45 CEST (UTC+2)	Okafor 71' (pen.)	Report	Petković (yellow card) 27'; Moharrami (yellow card) 68'; Ristovski (yellow card) 90+4'; Ademi (yellow card) 90+5'	Stadium: Stadion Wals-Siezenheim; Attendance: 28,864; Referee: Andris Treimanis (Latvia)

11 October 2022 4	Dinamo Zagreb (Croatia)	1–1	(Austria) Red Bull Salzburg	Zagreb, Croatia
21:00 CEST (UTC+2)	Ljubičić 40'; Ivanušec (yellow card) 52'	Report	Seiwald 12'; Pavlović (yellow card) 90'; Sučić (yellow card) 90+3'	Stadium: Maksimir; Attendance: 20,779; Referee: Tobias Stieler (Germany)

25 October 2022 5	Dinamo Zagreb (Croatia)	0–4	(Italy) Milan	Zagreb, Croatia
18:45 CEST (UTC+2)	Ademi (yellow card) 43'	Report	Gabbia 39'; De Ketelaere (yellow card) 46'; Leão 49'; Giroud 59' (pen.); Ljubičić 69' (o.g.)	Stadium: Maksimir; Attendance: 20,572; Referee: Szymon Marciniak (Poland)

2 November 2022 6	Chelsea (England)	2–1	(Croatia) Dinamo Zagreb	London, England
20:00 GMT (UTC±0)	Sterling 18'; Zakaria 30'; Koulibaly (yellow card) 39'	Report	Petković 7'; Mišić (yellow card) 22'; Ivanušec (yellow card) 54'; Moharrami (yellow card) 89'	Stadium: Stamford Bridge; Attendance: 39,392; Referee: François Letexier (France)
