= Dinko Horkaš =

Croatian footballer (born 1999)

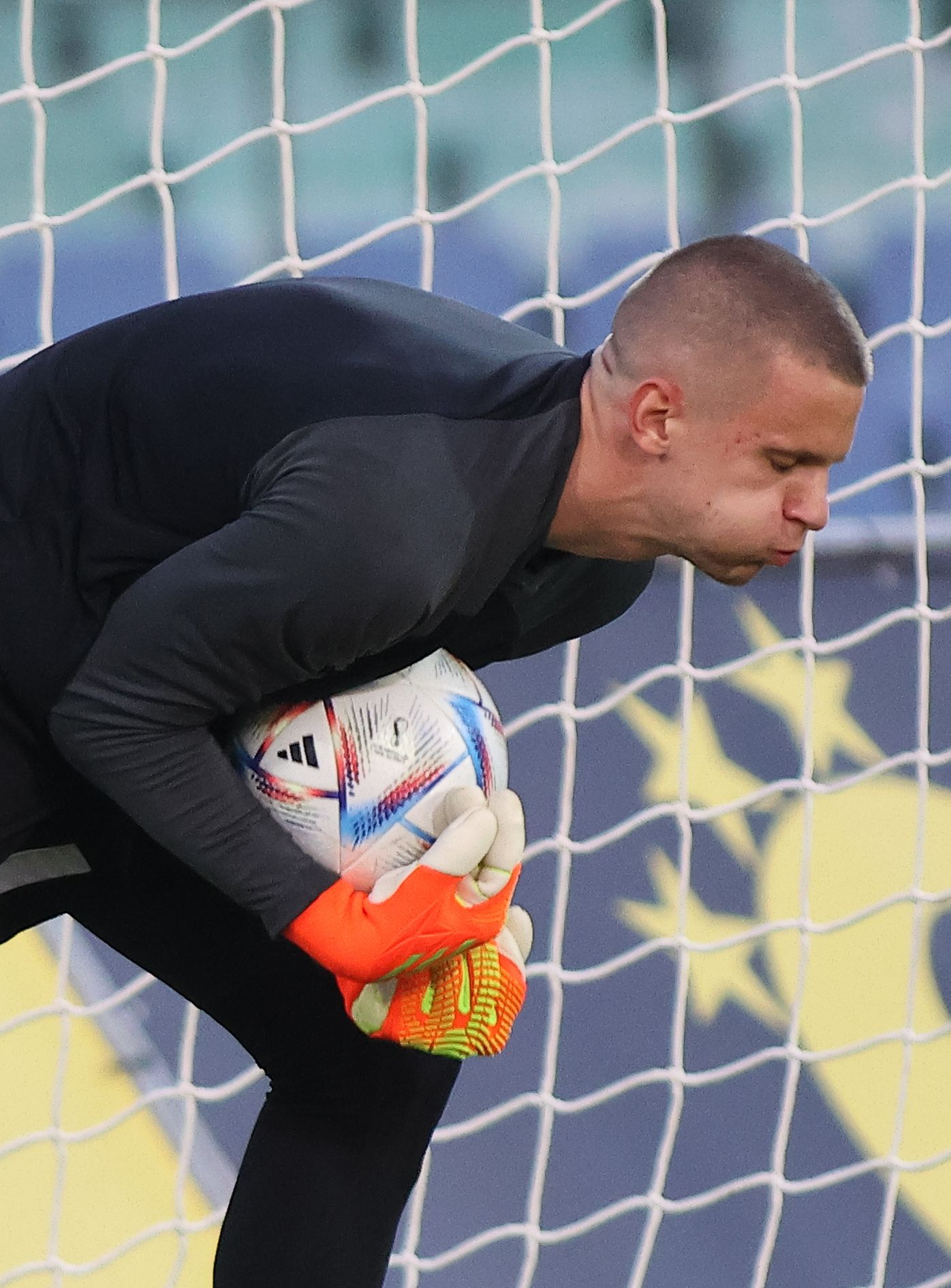

Personal information
- Date of birth: 10 March 1999 (age 27)
- Place of birth: Sisak, Croatia
- Height: 1.89 m (6 ft 2 in)
- Position: Goalkeeper

Team information
- Current team: Al Wasl
- Number: 23

Youth career
- 2007–2011: Segesta
- 2011–2016: Dinamo Zagreb

Senior career*
Years	Team	Apps	(Gls)
2016–2019	Dinamo Zagreb II	68	(0)
2020	→ Zrinjski Mostar (loan)	8	(0)
2020–2021	→ Varaždin (loan)	22	(0)
2022	→ Posušje (loan)	13	(0)
2022–2024	Lokomotiv Plovdiv	52	(0)
2024–2026	Las Palmas	54	(0)
2026–	Al Wasl	0	(0)

International career^{‡}
2015–2016	Croatia U17	10	(0)
2016–2017	Croatia U19	4	(0)
2019	Croatia U21	1	(0)
- * Club domestic league appearances and goals as of 3 June 2026 ‡ National team caps and goals as of 9 June 2023

Dinko Horkaš (pronounced [dînko xǒrkaʃ]; born 10 March 1999) is a Croatian professional footballer who plays as a goalkeeper for Emirati club Al Wasl.

Horkaš started his professional career at Dinamo Zagreb, playing in its reserve team, before being loaned to Zrinjski Mostar in 2020, to Varaždin later that year and to Posušje in 2022. Later that year, he joined Lokomotiv Plovdiv. Two years later, he moved to Las Palmas.

== Club career ==
=== Early career ===
Horkaš started playing football at his hometown club Segesta, before joining Dinamo Zagreb's youth academy in 2011. He made his professional debut against Imotski on 11 December 2016 at the age of 17.

In January 2020, he was loaned to Bosnian team Zrinjski Mostar until the end of season. In June, his loan was extended for additional six months.

In October, he was sent on a season-long loan to Varaždin.

In January 2022, Horkaš was loaned to Posušje for the remainder of campaign.

In July, he moved to Bulgarian side Lokomotiv Plovdiv.

=== Las Palmas ===
In June 2024, Horkaš signed a four-year deal with Spanish outfit Las Palmas.

== International career ==
Horkaš represented Croatia at all youth levels. He also served as a captain of the under-17 and the under-19 teams.

== Career statistics ==
=== Club ===
As of match played 24 May 2025

Appearances and goals by club, season and competition
Club	Season	League			National cup (Note: Includes Bosnian Cup, Bulgarian Cup)		Continental		Total	
Club	Season	Division	Apps	Goals	Apps	Goals	Apps	Goals	Apps	Goals
Dinamo Zagreb II	2016–17	Croatian First League	13	0	—		—		13	0
Dinamo Zagreb II	2017–18	Croatian First League	31	0	—		—		31	0
Dinamo Zagreb II	2018–19	Croatian First League	13	0	—		—		13	0
Dinamo Zagreb II	2019–20	Croatian First League	11	0	—		—		11	0
Dinamo Zagreb II	Total		68	0	—		—–		68	0
Zrinjski Mostar (loan)	2019–20	Bosnian Premier League	3	0	0	0	—		3	0
Zrinjski Mostar (loan)	2020–21	Bosnian Premier League	5	0	1	0	0	0	6	0
Zrinjski Mostar (loan)	Total		8	0	1	0	0	0	9	0
Varaždin (loan)	2020–21	Croatian Football League	22	0	0	0	—		22	0
Posušje (loan)	2021–22	Bosnian Premier League	13	0	—		—		13	0
Lokomotiv Plovdiv	2022–23	Bulgarian First League	27	0	2	0	—		29	0
Lokomotiv Plovdiv	2023–24	Bulgarian First League	21	0	2	0	—		23	0
Lokomotiv Plovdiv	Total		48	0	4	0	—		52	0
Las Palmas	2024–25	La Liga	13	0	3	0	—		16	0
Career total			172	0	8	0	0	0	180	0
