= Stefan Milić =

Montenegrin footballer (born 2000)

Personal information
- Date of birth: 6 July 2000 (age 26)
- Place of birth: Podgorica, Montenegro, FR Yugoslavia
- Height: 1.87 m (6 ft 2 in)
- Position: Defender

Team information
- Current team: Partizan
- Number: 44

Youth career
- Budućnost Podgorica

Senior career*
Years	Team	Apps	(Gls)
2018–2020	Budućnost Podgorica	56	(4)
2020–2023	Dinamo Zagreb	3	(1)
2020	→ Budućnost Podgorica (loan)	10	(0)
2020–2021	→ Varaždin (loan)	6	(0)
2021	→ Dinamo Zagreb II	16	(2)
2022	→ Bravo (loan)	27	(1)
2023	→ Septemvri Sofia (loan)	8	(0)
2023–2025	Dečić	42	(0)
2025	Chernomorets Novorossiysk	12	(0)
2025–	Partizan	41	(1)

International career^{‡}
2016–2017	Montenegro U17	13	(0)
2018	Montenegro U19	8	(0)
2019–2021	Montenegro U21	13	(0)
2025–	Montenegro	3	(0)
- * Club domestic league appearances and goals as of 8 November 2026 ‡ National team caps and goals as of 5 June 2026

Stefan Milić (Montenegrin: Стефан Милић; born 6 July 2000) is a Montenegrin professional footballer who plays as a defender for Serbian SuperLiga club Partizan and the Montenegro national team.

== Club career ==
A youth academy product of Budućnost Podgorica, Milić made his senior team debut on 31 March 2018 in a 1–1 draw against Kom. He scored his first goal on 12 August 2018 in a 3–0 win against Mornar. Despite interest from Partizan, Red Bull Salzburg, Osijek and Mladá Boleslav, Croatian club Dinamo Zagreb announced the signing of Milić on 18 February 2020 on a permanent transfer. He spent the rest of the 2019–20 season on loan at Budućnost.

On 21 July 2020, Milić officially joined Dinamo Zagreb. He made his debut for the club on 16 August in a 6–0 win against Lokomotiva. On 23 September, he was loaned out to Varaždin until the end of the season. He became the second Montenegrin player at Varaždin, after Vladan Adžić. He returned to Dinamo during the winter break. During the second half of the season, Milić primarily played for Dinamo's second team. On 28 April 2021, he scored the first goal in a 3–0 victory over Osijek II. On 22 May, he scored his debut goal for Dinamo's first team in a 1–0 victory over Šibenik.

== International career ==
Milić was a Montenegrin youth international.

== Career statistics ==
=== Club ===
As of match played 8 November 2026

Appearances and goals by club, season and competition
Club	Season	League			National cup (Note: Includes Montenegrin Cup, Croatian Cup)		Continental		Total	
Club	Season	Division	Apps	Goals	Apps	Goals	Apps	Goals	Apps	Goals
Budućnost Podgorica	2017–18	1. CFL	10	0	1	0	0	0	11	0
Budućnost Podgorica	2018–19	1. CFL	29	3	3	0	2 (Note: Appearance(s) in UEFA Europa League)	0	34	3
Budućnost Podgorica	2019–20	1. CFL	27	1	2	0	4	0	33	1
Budućnost Podgorica	Total		66	4	6	0	6	0	78	4
Dinamo Zagreb	2020–21	Prva HNL	3	1	0	0	0	0	3	1
Varaždin (loan)	2020–21	Prva HNL	6	0	1	0	—		7	0
Dinamo Zagreb II	2020–21	Druga HNL	7	1	—		—		7	1
Dinamo Zagreb II	2021–22	Druga HNL	9	1	—		—		9	1
Dinamo Zagreb II	Total		16	2	—		—		16	2
Bravo (loan)	2021–22	Slovenian PrvaLiga	13	1	2	0	—		15	1
Bravo (loan)	2022–23	Slovenian PrvaLiga	14	0	0	0	—		14	0
Bravo (loan)	Total		27	1	2	0	—		29	1
Septemvri Sofia (loan)	2022–23	Parva Liga	8	0	0	0	—		8	0
Dečić	2023–24	1. CFL	28	0	0	0	—		28	0
Dečić	2024–25	1. CFL	14	0	0	0	2	0	16	0
Dečić	Total		42	0	0	0	2	0	44	0
Chernomorets Novorossiysk	2024–25	Russian First League	12	0	—		—		12	0
Partizan	2025–26	Serbian SuperLiga	31	0	—		3	0	34	0
Partizan	2026–27	Serbian SuperLiga	10	1	0	0	5	0	15	1
Partizan	Total		41	1	0	0	8	0	49	1
Career total			219	9	9	0	16	0	244	9

=== International ===
As of match played 5 June 2026

Appearances and goals by national team and year
National team	Year	Apps	Goals
Montenegro	2025	1	0
Montenegro	2026	2	0
Total		3	0

== Honours ==
Budućnost Podgorica

- Montenegrin First League: 2019–20
- Montenegrin Cup: 2018–19

Dinamo Zagreb

- Croatian First League: 2020–21
