= Oliver Zelenika =

Croatian professional footballer (born 1993)

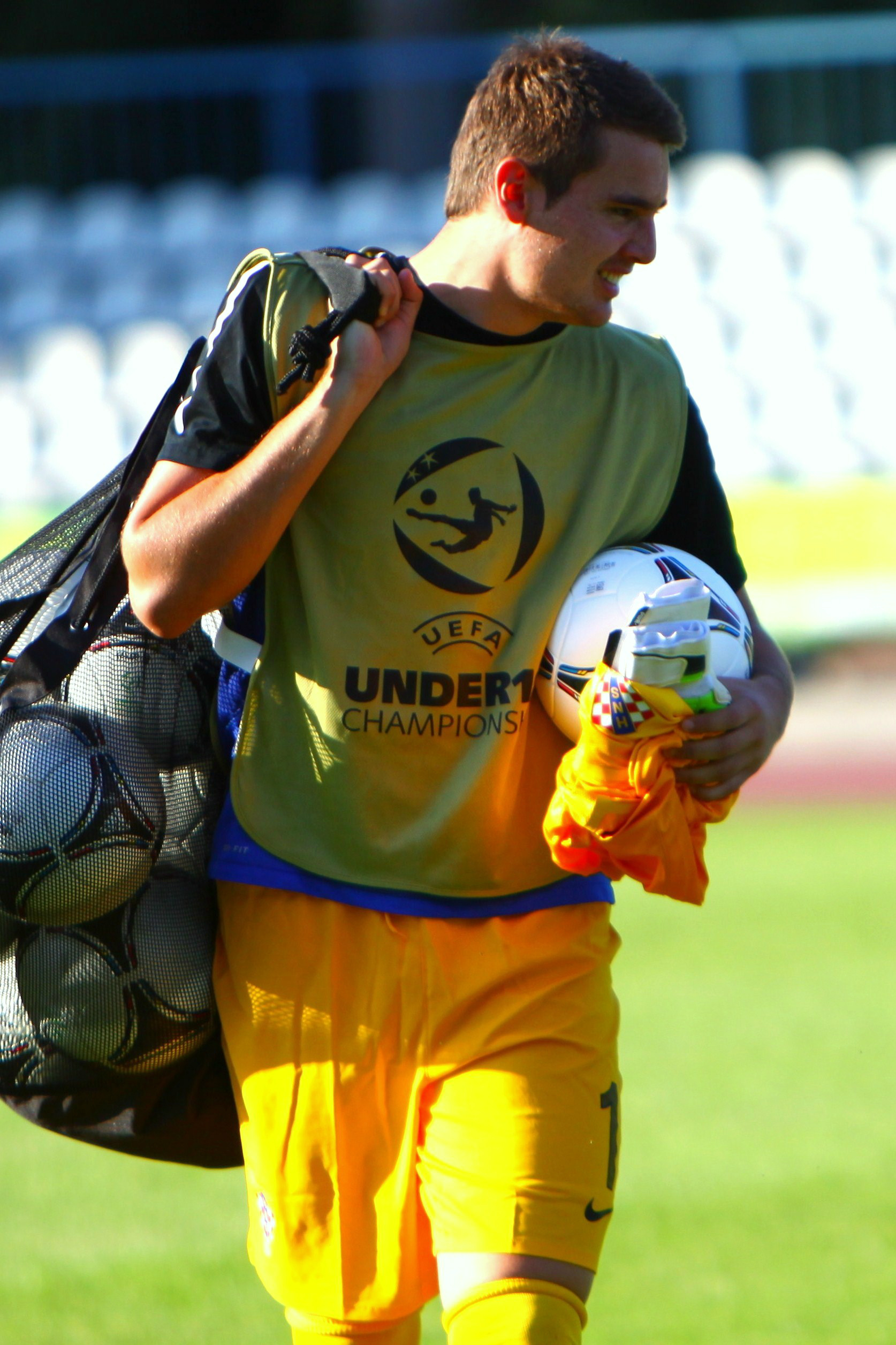
- Oliver Zelenika with Croatia U19 in 2012

Personal information
- Full name: Oliver Zelenika
- Date of birth: 14 May 1993 (age 33)
- Place of birth: Zagreb, Croatia
- Height: 1.92 m (6 ft 4 in)
- Position: Goalkeeper

Team information
- Current team: APOEL
- Number: 1

Youth career
- 1999–2006: NK Špansko Zagreb
- 2006–2011: Dinamo Zagreb

Senior career*
Years	Team	Apps	(Gls)
2011–2016	Dinamo Zagreb	12	(0)
2012–2013	→ Rudeš (loan)	29	(0)
2014–2016	→ Lokomotiva (loan)	58	(0)
2017–2018	Lechia Gdańsk	1	(0)
2018–2019	NEC	4	(0)
2020–2026	Varaždin	149	(0)
2026–	APOEL	0	(0)

International career
2007	Croatia U14	2	(0)
2008	Croatia U15	2	(0)
2009	Croatia U16	6	(0)
2009–2010	Croatia U17	11	(0)
2011	Croatia U18	2	(0)
2011–2012	Croatia U19	7	(0)
2012–2013	Croatia U20	5	(0)
2013–2014	Croatia U21	8	(0)
- * Club domestic league appearances and goals as of 15 June 2026

Oliver Zelenika (pronounced [ǒliʋer zelěnika]; born 14 May 1993) is a Croatian professional footballer who plays as a goalkeeper for Cypriot First Division club APOEL.

==Early life and career== Zelenika was born in Zagreb on 14 May 1993. He began playing football casually as a young boy in his neighbourhood, and because he was the youngest of his clique he involuntarily played as a goalkeeper so that the older boys could be outfield players. He eventually started to enjoy this role and pursued to develop his goalkeeping skills in the youth teams of Špansko. At the age 13, he joined Dinamo Zagreb Academy.

== Club career ==
=== Early years ===
Zelenika's professional career took off in Dinamo Zagreb. After completing his youth academy training, he would finally be promoted to the first-team squad in 2011, albeit shortly thereafter, without making a single appearance for the club, he would join a tier two club Rudeš on a season-long loan spell. While at Rudeš, he immediately established himself as a first-choice goalkeeper for the club and, in the end, missed out on only one out of 30 league matches the club played during their 2012–13 Druga HNL campaign and conceded a total of 30 goals.

=== Dinamo Zagreb and Lokomotiva Zagreb ===
At the end of the 2012–13 season, Zelenika returned to Dinamo Zagreb and rejoined the club's first-team squad. On 23 July 2013, after an abrupt departure of the club's first-team goalkeeper Pablo Migliore, Zelenika was fielded by the head coach Krunoslav Jurčić in a 2013–14 UEFA Champions League qualifying phase home match against Fola Esch, thus making his first official appearance for the club and also keeping a clean sheet in a 1–0 win. He would make his first league appearance for the club five days later, playing a full match and keeping a clean sheet in a goalless draw against Rijeka. After achieving his fourth consecutive clean sheet in his fourth appearance for the club, Jurčić praised Zelenika and commented that he "is exactly the type of a goalkeeper the club needs, a one that would not touch the ball for 60 minutes, but would still be able to react well enough to an opponent's clear-cut chance." In a matter of weeks Zelenika's squad status changed from a talented reserve goalkeeper to a first-team regular. Before he would leave the club on 24 January 2014 to join Lokomotiva on a five-months long loan spell, Zelenika will have produced a tally of 23 appearances for the club and concede 17 goals. He would remain a first-choice goalkeeper for Lokomotiva as well and would go on to make another 15 league appearances by the end of the 2013–14 Prva HNL season. He would remain a first-choice goalkeeper for Lokomotiva next two seasons and make another 43 league appearances. In the summer of 2016, he didn't receive a new contract and left the club as a free player.

=== Lechia Gdańsk ===
On 15 March 2017 he signed a contract until the summer of 2018 with Lechia Gdańsk. A backup for Dušan Kuciak, he went on to feature in a single league match - a goalless home draw with Cracovia on 23 April 2018. In June 2018, Zelenika became a free player again.

=== NEC Nijmegen ===
Zelenika signed a contract until the end of the season with the option of an additional year for the Dutch Eerste Divisie side NEC Nijmegen on 29 October 2018, following the injury of the first-choice keeper Norbert Alblas.

=== APOEL FC ===
On 3 September 2026, APOEL announced the signing of Croatian goalkeeper Oliver Zelenika from NK Varaždin. APOEL welcomes Oliver Zelenika and wishes him every success in the blue and yellow.

== International ==
As of match played 3 September 2014, Zelenika has made a total of 43 appearances for the youth teams of the Croatia national team. Furthermore, he won caps for all of the eight official Croatia national youth teams, ranging from under-14 to under-21 age groups. He played his first international match on 5 June 2007, keeping a clean sheet for the under-14 team in a friendly match against Bavaria. Most notably, he was fielded in all of the three matches the under-20 team played in the group stage of the 2013 FIFA U-20 World Cup.

On 14 May 2014 Croatia national team manager Niko Kovač included Zelenika as a third goalkeeper on a shortlist of 30 players that would represent Croatia at the 2014 FIFA World Cup. His call-up was confirmed on 31 May 2014, when he was listed in a final 23-man squad that would travel to the host nation of Brazil.

== Style of play ==
Zelenika stands 1.92 meters tall, and his dominant foot is left. With regard to his goalkeeping skills, football coach Krunoslav Jurčić described Zelenika as an ideal player for the teams with a strong defensive play that will make the goalkeeper behind it idle for most of the match and then require of him to keep his focus high when reacting to those handful of shots that the opposing team may direct at the goal.

== Career statistics ==
As of match played 15 June 2026

Appearances and goals by club, season and competition
Club	Season	League			National Cup		Continental		Other		Total	
Club	Season	Division	Apps	Goals	Apps	Goals	Apps	Goals	Apps	Goals	Apps	Goals
Dinamo Zagreb	2011–12	Prva HNL	0	0	0	0	0	0	0	0	0	0
Dinamo Zagreb	2013–14	Prva HNL	12	0	2	0	9	0	0	0	23	0
Dinamo Zagreb	Total		58	0	5	0	4	0	—		67	0
Rudeš (loan)	2012–13	Druga HNL	29	0	0	0	—		—		29	0
Lokomotiva (loan)	2013–14	Prva HNL	15	0	—		—		—		15	0
Lokomotiva (loan)	2014–15	Prva HNL	10	0	2	0	—		—		12	0
Lokomotiva (loan)	2015–16	Prva HNL	33	0	3	0	4	0	—		40	0
Lokomotiva (loan)	Total		58	0	5	0	4	0	—		67	0
Lechia Gdańsk	2016–17	Ekstraklasa	0	0	0	0	—		—		0	0
Lechia Gdańsk	2017–18	Ekstraklasa	1	0	0	0	—		—		1	0
Lechia Gdańsk	Total		1	0	0	0	—		—		1	0
NEC	2018–19	Eerste Divisie	4	0	0	0	—		0	0	4	0
Varaždin	2019–20	Prva HNL	0	0	—		—		—		0	0
Varaždin	2020–21	Prva HNL	16	0	2	0	—		—		18	0
Varaždin	2021–22	Druga HNL	2	0	2	0	—		—		4	0
Varaždin	2022–23	Prva HNL	34	0	1	0	—		—		35	0
Varaždin	2023–24	Prva HNL	33	0	1	0	—		—		34	0
Varaždin	2024–25	Prva HNL	32	0	0	0	—		—		32	0
Varaždin	2025–26	Prva HNL	32	0	0	0	2	0	—		34	0
Varaždin	Total		149	0	6	0	2	0	—		157	0
Career total			243	0	13	0	15	0	0	0	271	0
