= Damjan Daničić =

Serbian association football player

Personal information
- Full name: Damjan Daničić
- Date of birth: 24 January 2000 (age 26)
- Place of birth: Zagreb, Croatia
- Height: 1.85 m (6 ft 1 in)
- Position: Left-back

Team information
- Current team: FAP
- Number: 55

Youth career
- –2019: Red Star Belgrade
- 2018–2019: → Grafičar Beograd (loan)

Senior career*
Years	Team	Apps	(Gls)
2019–2020	Voždovac	6	(0)
2020–2022	Dinamo Zagreb	5	(0)
2020–2022	→ Dinamo Zagreb II	35	(3)
2020–2021	→ Varaždin (loan)	5	(0)
2021	→ Istra 1961 (loan)	12	(0)
2022	Sumgayit	11	(0)
2023	Voždovac	10	(0)
2023–2024	OFK Beograd	1	(0)
2024–2025	Mladost Novi Sad	15	(0)
2025	Budućnost Dobanovci		
2026–	FAP	8	(0)

International career^{‡}
2018–2019	Serbia U19	5	(0)
2020–2022	Serbia U21	11	(0)
- * Club domestic league appearances and goals as of 14 June 2024 ‡ National team caps and goals as of 7 June 2022

Damjan Daničić (Serbian Cyrillic: Дамјан Даничић, pronounced [dǎmjan dǎnitʃitɕ]; born 24 January 2000) is a Serbian professional footballer who plays as a left-back for FAP.

== Club career ==
=== Voždovac ===
Daničić is a youth prospect of Serbian giants Red Star Belgrade, whose academy he left in 2019 and joined Serbian SuperLiga side Voždovac on free transfer. He made his SuperLiga debut on 27 July 2019 in a 2–2 draw with Proleter Novi Sad. Three months later, on 9 October, he made his Serbian Cup debut as Teleoptik defeated Voždovac 8–7 in a penalty shootout. He made seven appearances for Voždovac in the first half of the season.

=== Dinamo Zagreb ===
Due to lack of playing time, in the shadow of in-form Stefan Hajdin, Daničić signed in January 2020 with Croatian champions Dinamo Zagreb, whose academy his father used to attend during coach Otto Barić's tenure, on free transfer. He became the second Serbian player after Komnen Andrić to play for Dinamo since the independence of Croatia. The transfer sparked minor controversy in Serbia due to rivalry between Dinamo and Daničić's youth club Red Star.

He debuted for Dinamo on 27 January 2020 in Premier League International Cup against Leicester City, as the English side won 2–1. He made his Druga HNL debut for Dinamo Zagreb II on 22 February 2020 in a 2–2 draw with Orijent 1919. The first team coach Zoran Mamić gave Daničić a chance in the first team on 18 July, as he made his Prva HNL debut in a goalless draw with Istra 1961.

On 19 October, he was loaned out to Prva HNL side Varaždin until the end of the season. He made his debut for Varaždin on 23 October in a 2–1 loss to Slaven Belupo. He was returned from loan in January 2021. He scored his first goal for Dinamo II on 12 April, in a 3–1 victory over Orijent 1919. He scored his second goal on 5 May in an upset 2–0 victory over Hrvatski Dragovoljac.

== International career ==
Born in Zagreb to Serbian parents, Daničić holds both Serbian and Croatian citizenships, making him eligible for both Serbia and Croatia national teams.

He earned his first call-up to Serbia under-21 team on 29 September 2020, when coach Ilija Stolica called him up for Under-21 Euro 2021 qualifiers against Poland and Estonia. He debuted against the latter opponent on 13 October in a game that ended in a goalless draw.

== Career statistics ==
=== Club ===
As of match played 18 December 2021

Appearances and goals by club, season and competition
Club	Season	League			Cup (Note: Includes appearances in Serbian Cup and Croatian Cup)		Continental		Total	
Club	Season	Division	Apps	Goals	Apps	Goals	Apps	Goals	Apps	Goals
Voždovac	2019–20	Serbian SuperLiga	6	0	1	0	—		7	0
Dinamo Zagreb II	2019–20	Druga HNL	2	0	—		—		2	0
Dinamo Zagreb II	2020–21	Druga HNL	22	2	—		—		22	2
Dinamo Zagreb II	Total		24	2	—		—		24	2
Dinamo Zagreb	2019–20	Prva HNL	2	0	—		—		2	0
Dinamo Zagreb	2020–21	Prva HNL	3	0	1	0	0	0	4	0
Dinamo Zagreb	Total		5	0	1	0	0	0	6	0
Varaždin (loan)	2020–21	Prva HNL	5	0	1	0	—		6	0
Istra 1961 (loan)	2021–22	Prva HNL	12	0	1	0	—		13	0
Career total			52	2	4	0	0	0	56	2

== Honours ==
Dinamo Zagreb

- Prva HNL: 2019–20
