= Andris Herrera =

Venezuelan footballer (born 1996)

Personal information
- Full name: Andris Jesús Herrera Salgado
- Date of birth: 20 October 1996 (age 30)
- Place of birth: Caracas, Venezuela
- Height: 1.75 m (5 ft 9 in)
- Position: Second striker

Youth career
- –2014: Caracas

Senior career*
Years	Team	Apps	(Gls)
2014–2017	Caracas	8	(1)
2016	→ Portuguesa (loan)	16	(3)
2017–2020	Estudiantes de Mérida	85	(7)
2020–2021	Yaracuyanos	18	(1)
2021–2023	Varaždin	58	(8)
2024	Caracas	10	(1)

International career^{‡}
2013	Venezuela U17	3	(0)
- * Club domestic league appearances and goals as of 25 May 2023 ‡ National team caps and goals as of 24 October 2013

Andris Jesús Herrera Salgado (born 20 October 1996) is a Venezuelan professional footballer who plays as a second striker.

== Club career ==
=== Varaždin ===
In February 2021, he signed for Croatian club Varaždin on a free transfer. In his second season at the club, they won the league and returned to the top flight.

== Career statistics ==
=== Club ===
As of match played 9 November 2022

Appearances and goals by club, season and competition
Club	Season	League			Cup		Continental		Other		Total	
Club	Season	League	Apps	Goals	Apps	Goals	Apps	Goals	Apps	Goals	Apps	Goals
Caracas	2013–14	Venezuelan Primera División	1	0	0	0	–		–		1	0
Caracas	2015	Venezuelan Primera División	2	0	0	0	–		–		2	0
Caracas	2016	Venezuelan Primera División	5	1	0	0	–		–		5	1
Caracas	Total		8	1	0	0	–		–		8	1
Portuguesa (loan)	2016	Venezuelan Primera División	16	3	1	0	–		–		17	3
Estudiantes de Mérida	2017	Venezuelan Primera División	26	2	1	0	0	0	–		27	2
Estudiantes de Mérida	2018	Venezuelan Primera Divisióna	24	2	1	0	2	1	–		27	3
Estudiantes de Mérida	2019	Venezuelan Primera División	35	3	2	0	2	0	–		39	3
Estudiantes de Mérida	Total		85	7	4	0	4	1	–		93	8
Yaracuyanos	2020	Venezuelan Primera División	18	1	0	0	–		–		18	1
Varaždin	2020–21	Prva HNL	15	2	0	0	–		–		35	2
Varaždin	2021–22	Druga HNL	23	6	2	0	–		–		25	6
Varaždin	2022–23	Prva HNL	13	0	1	0	–		–		14	0
Varaždin	Total		51	8	3	0	–		–		54	8
Career total			178	20	8	0	4	1	0	0	190	21

== Honours ==
Caracas

- Copa Venezuela: 2013

Varaždin

- Druga HNL: 2021–22
