= Igor Postonjski =

Croatian footballer

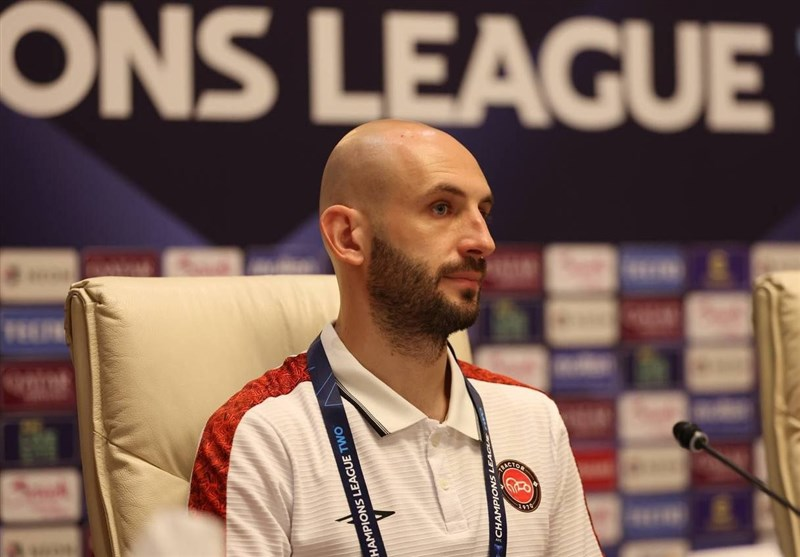

Personal information
- Full name: Igor Postonjski
- Date of birth: 4 February 1995 (age 31)
- Place of birth: Zabok, Croatia
- Height: 1.77 m (5 ft 10 in)
- Position: Defensive midfielder

Team information
- Current team: Tractor
- Number: 8

Youth career
- 2012–2014: Rijeka

Senior career*
Years	Team	Apps	(Gls)
2014–2017	Gorica	40	(5)
2017–2020	Inter Zaprešić	102	(3)
2020	Zagorec	2	(0)
2021–2024	Varaždin	83	(15)
2024–	Tractor	27	(0)

International career^{‡}
2010	Croatia U15	2	(0)
- * Club domestic league appearances and goals as of 1 August 2025 ‡ National team caps and goals as of 24 July 2010 (UTC)

Igor Postonjski (born 04 February 1995) is a Croatian footballer who plays for Iranian club Tractor as a midfielder.

== Club career ==
Postonjski started his career with Croatian side Gorica. In 2017, he signed for Croatian side Inter Zaprešić. In 2021, he signed for Croatian side Varaždin. On 19 July 2024, Postonjski joined Tractor on a one-year contract.

== Career statistics ==
As of match played 30 June 2025

Appearances and goals by club, season and competition
Club	Season	League			National cup (Note: Includes Croatian Football Cup, Iranian Hazfi Cup)		Continental		Other		Total	
Club	Season	Division	Apps	Goals	Apps	Goals	Apps	Goals	Apps	Goals	Apps	Goals
Gorica	2014–15	Druga HNL	11	0	0	0	—		—		11	0
Gorica	2015–16	Druga HNL	16	2	1	0	—		—		17	2
Gorica	2016–17	Druga HNL	13	3	1	0	—		—		14	3
Gorica	Total		40	5	2	0	—		—		42	5
Inter Zaprešić	2016–17	Prva HNL	15	0	0	0	—		—		15	0
Inter Zaprešić	2017–18	Prva HNL	27	0	2	1	—		—		29	1
Inter Zaprešić	2018–19	Prva HNL	30	3	2	0	—		—		32	3
Inter Zaprešić	2019–20	Prva HNL	30	0	3	1	—		—		33	1
Inter Zaprešić	Total		102	3	7	2	—		—		109	5
Varaždin	2020–21	Prva HNL	20	0	0	0	—		—		20	0
Varaždin	2021–22	Druga HNL	24	7	2	1	—		—		26	8
Varaždin	2022–23	Prva HNL	8	1	0	0	—		—		8	1
Varaždin	2023–24	Prva HNL	31	7	2	1	—		—		33	8
Varaždin	Total		83	15	4	2	—		—		87	17
Tractor	2024–25	Persian Gulf Pro League	27	0	1	0	8 (Note: Appearances in AFC Champions League Two)	0	—		36	0
Tractor	2025–26	Persian Gulf Pro League	0	0	0	0	0	0	1 (Note: Appearance in Iranian Super Cup)	0	1	0
Tractor	Total		27	0	1	0	8	0	1	0	37	0
Career total			252	23	14	4	8	0	1	0	275	27

== Honours ==
Tractor

- Persian Gulf Pro League: 2024–25
- Iranian Super Cup: 2025
