= Itsuki Urata =

Japanese footballer (born 1997)

Personal information
- Date of birth: 29 January 1997 (age 29)
- Place of birth: Tokyo, Japan
- Height: 1.77 m (5 ft 10 in)
- Position: Left-back

Team information
- Current team: Slaven Belupo
- Number: 77

Youth career
- JEF United Chiba

Senior career*
Years	Team	Apps	(Gls)
2015–2017	JEF United Chiba	0	(0)
2015	→ J.League U-22 Selection	1	(0)
2016	→ PSTC (loan)	2	(0)
2016	→ Ryukyu (loan)	8	(0)
2017	→ Giravanz Kitakyushu (loan)	13	(0)
2018	Giravanz Kitakyushu	26	(1)
2019	Zorya Luhansk	0	(0)
2020–2023	Varaždin	61	(2)
2023–2024	Maribor	19	(0)
2024–2026	Bunyodkor	37	(2)
2026–	Slaven Belupo	2	(0)

International career
2013–2014	Japan U17		
2014–2015	Japan U18		
2016	Japan U19		
2017	Japan U20		
2018	Japan U23		
- * Club domestic league appearances and goals as of 14 August 2026

Itsuki Urata (浦田 樹, Urata Itsuki; born 29 January 1997) is a Japanese professional footballer who plays as a left-back for Croatian Football League club Slaven Belupo.

== Career ==
Urata joined J2 League club JEF United Chiba in 2015. In September 2016, he moved to J3 League club FC Ryukyu on loan.

On 18 August 2020, Urata joined Croatian First Football League club Varaždin on a permanent deal.

On 23 June 2023, Urata joined Slovenian side Maribor on a free transfer, signing a one-year deal with the option for another season.

On 25 July 2024, he signed a contract with the Uzbek club Bunyodkor.

== Career statistics ==
As of 1 January 2018

Appearances and goals by club, season and competition
Season	Club	League			National cup		Total	
Season	Club	Division	Apps	Goals	Apps	Goals	Apps	Goals
2015	JEF United Chiba	J2 League	0	0	0	0	0	0
2016	JEF United Chiba	J2 League	0	0	0	0	0	0
2016	FC Ryukyu	J3 League	8	0	0	0	8	0
2017	Giravanz Kitakyushu	J3 League	13	0	0	0	13	0
Total			21	0	0	0	21	0
