= Mehdi Mehdikhani =

Iranian footballer

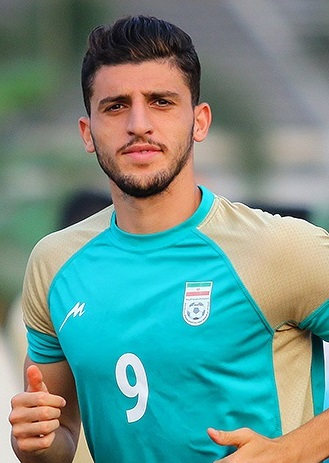

Personal information
- Full name: Mohammad Mehdi Mehdikhani
- Date of birth: July 28, 1997 (age 29)
- Place of birth: Kermanshah, Iran
- Height: 1.81 m (5 ft 11 in)
- Positions: Forward; attacking midfielder; wing back

Team information
- Current team: Be'sat Kermanshah
- Number: 2

Youth career
- –2015: Saipa
- 2015–2017: Niroye Zamini

Senior career*
Years	Team	Apps	(Gls)
2017–2019	Shahr Khodro	39	(2)
2019–2020	Varaždin	25	(1)
2020–2022	Persepolis	15	(0)
2022–2023	Havadar	18	(0)
2024–2025	Damash Gilan	16	(0)
2025–	Be'sat Kermanshah	44	(3)

International career^{‡}
2016–2017	Iran U20	9	(6)
2017–	Iran U23	7	(2)
- * Club domestic league appearances and goals as of 13 February 2023 ‡ National team caps and goals as of 17 November 2020

Mehdi Mehdikhani (Persian: مهدی مهدی‌خانی; born 28 July 1997 in Kermanshah) is an Iranian professional football player who plays as a forward for Azadegan League club Be'sat Kermanshah.

== Club career ==
=== Persepolis ===
On 16 November 2020, Mehdikhani signed a two-year contract with Persian Gulf Pro League champions Persepolis.

== Club career statistics ==
As of 2 June 2022

Club	Division	Season	League		Cup		Continental		Total	
Club	Division	Season	Apps	Goals	Apps	Goals	Apps	Goals	Apps	Goals
Shahr Khodro	Pro League	2017–18	12	0	0	0	—		12	0
Shahr Khodro	Pro League	2018–19	26	2	2	1	—		28	3
Shahr Khodro	Total		38	2	2	1	—		40	3
Varaždin	Prva NHL	2019–20	17	1	2	1	—		19	2
Persepolis	Pro League	2020–21	11	0	2	0	3	0	16	0
Persepolis	Pro League	2021–22	4	0	0	0	—		4	0
Persepolis	Total		15	0	2	0	3	0	20	0
Career Totals			70	3	6	2	3	0	79	5

== Honours ==
Persepolis

- Iranian Super Cup; Runner-Up (1): 2021
