= Zoran Kastel =

Croatian footballer and manager

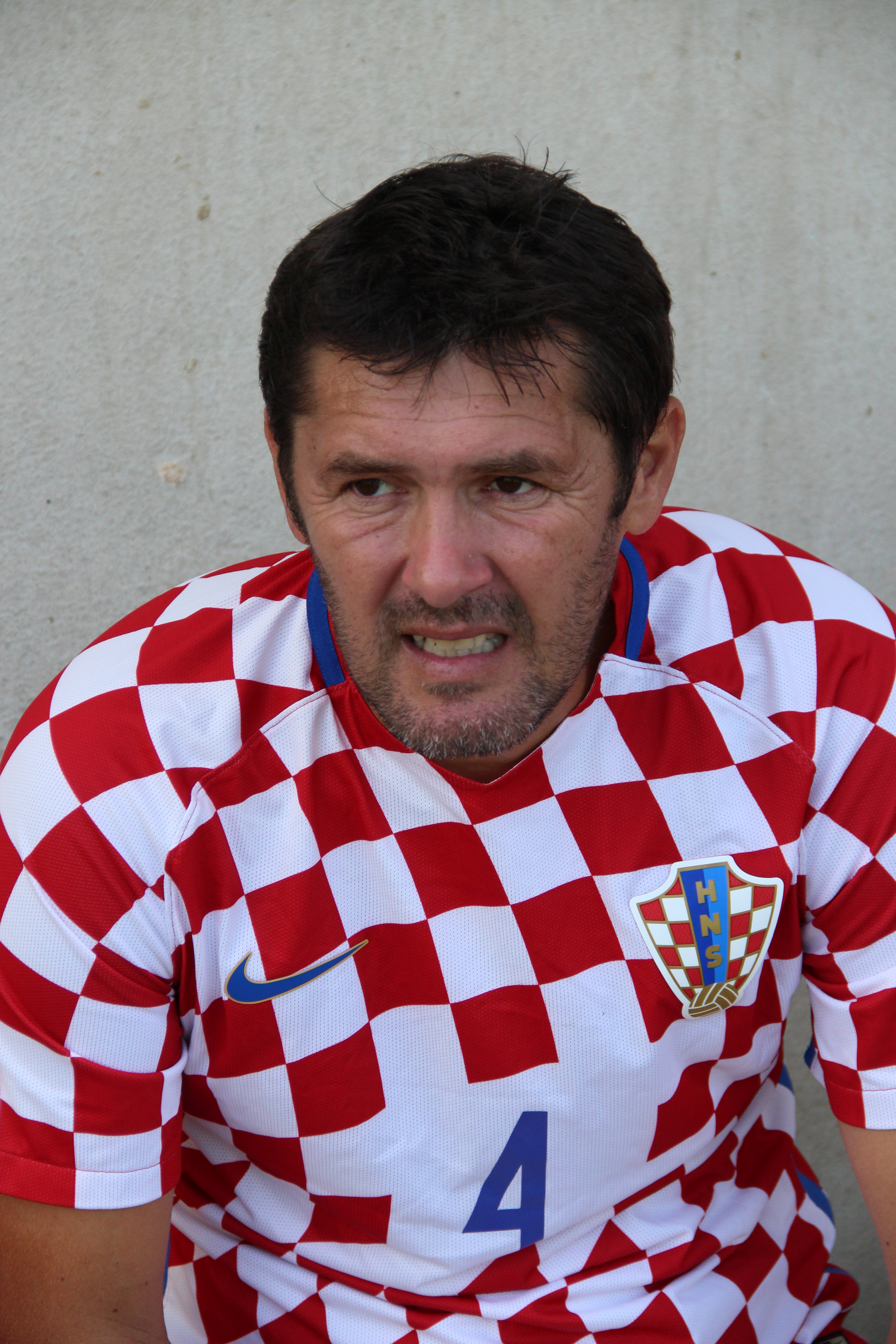
- Kastel in 2018

Personal information
- Full name: Zoran Kastel
- Date of birth: 22 October 1972 (age 54)
- Place of birth: Osijek, SR Croatia, SFR Yugoslavia
- Height: 1.90 m (6 ft 3 in)
- Position: Midfielder

Senior career*
Years	Team	Apps	(Gls)
1992	Osijek	15	(0)
1992–1993	Belišće	28	(2)
1993–1994	Osijek	17	(0)
1995–1996	Slavonija Požega	30	(2)
1996–1997	Inker Zaprešić	3	(0)
1997–2005	Varteks	187	(9)
2006–2007	Dinamo Tirana	38	(2)
Total		318	(15)

Managerial career
- Graničar
- Ivančica
- 2013-2014: Podravina
- 2014-2015: Varaždin
- 2015-2016: Al Taawoun U23
- 2017: Varaždin
- 2017-2018: Al Ittihad Kalba U17
- 2018–2020: Varaždin (assistant)
- 2020–2021: Varaždin
- * Club domestic league appearances and goals

Zoran Kastel (born 22 October 1972) is a Croatian professional football manager and former player who most recently manager of Prva HNL club Varaždin.

== Playing career ==
=== Club ===
Born in Varaždin, Kastel joined the youth academy of the local powerhouse Varteks. He was promoted to the club's first team squad for the 1998–99 season, and soon established himself as a regular member of the team, appearing in 23 league matches in his debut season. He had appeared in a total of 171 Prva HNL matches and scored 9 goals in his seven and a half seasons with Varteks, before leaving the club to join the Albanian Superliga side Dinamo Tirana during the winter break of the 2006–07 season. He played for the Albanian powerhouse for a season and a half, before retiring in July 2007.

== Managerial career ==
Kastel worked as an assistant to Mladen Posavec in Saudi Arabia and as coach of the U17 team of Al Ittihad Kalba in the United Arab Emirates. He replaced Samir Toplak as manager of Varaždin in December 2020.

== Managerial statistics ==
As of match played 22 May 2021

Managerial record by team and tenure
Team	From	To	Record				
Team	From	To	G	W	D	L	Win %
Varaždin	27 May 2017	19 September 2017	6	2	2	2	33.33
Varaždin	7 December 2020	28 May 2021	22	3	7	12	13.64
Total			28	5	9	14	17.86
