= Dario Špikić =

Croatian footballer

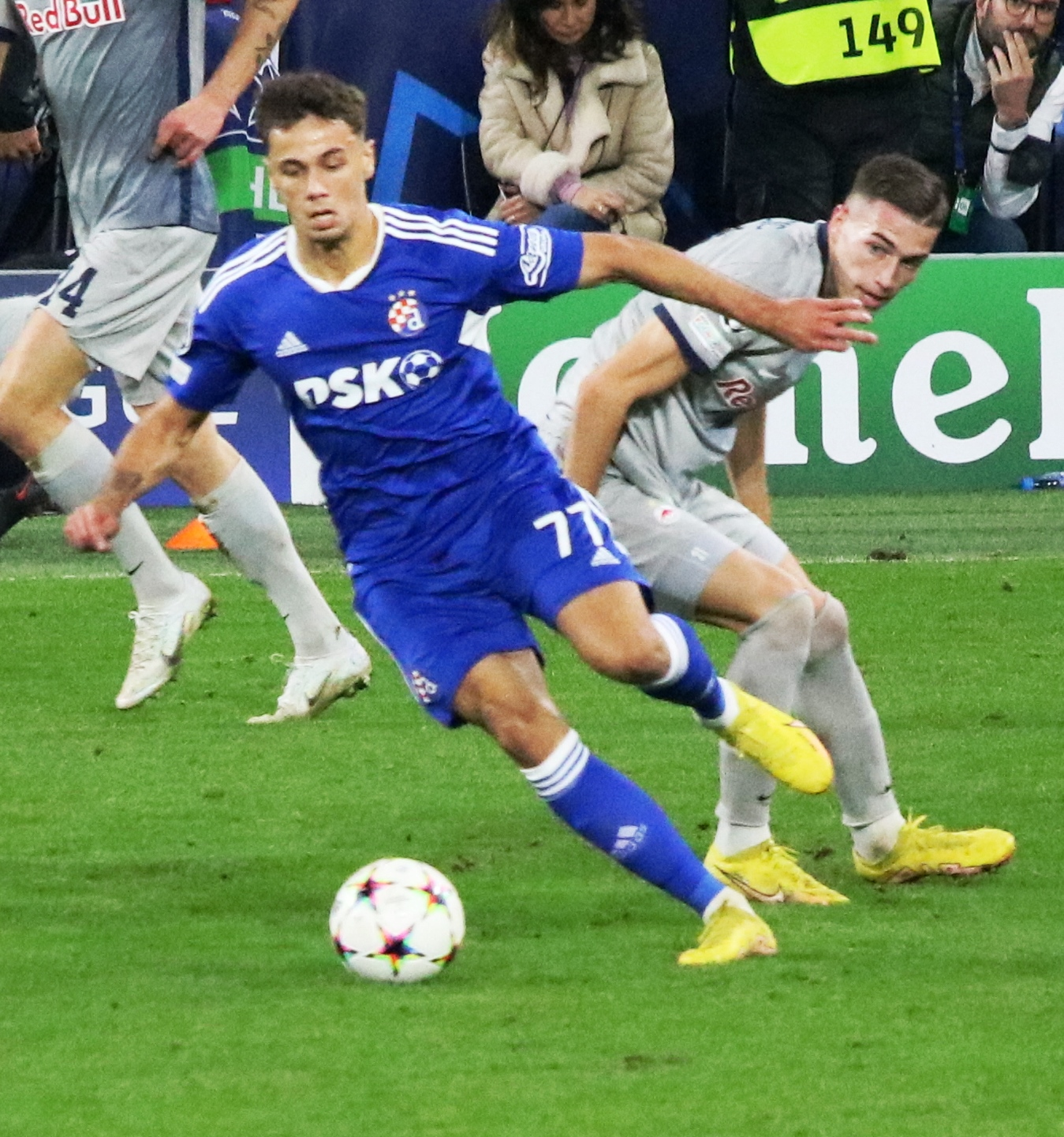
- Dario Špikić playing for Dinamo Zagreb.

Personal information
- Full name: Dario Špikić
- Date of birth: 22 March 1999 (age 27)
- Place of birth: Zagreb, Croatia
- Height: 1.82 m (6 ft 0 in)
- Position: Winger

Team information
- Current team: Rio Ave
- Number: 18

Youth career
- 2007: Kurilovec
- 2007–2017: Dinamo Zagreb

Senior career*
| Years | Team | Apps | (Gls) |
| 2017–2018 | Dinamo Zagreb II | 27 | (3) |
| 2017–2020 | Hajduk Split | 1 | (0) |
| 2018–2020 | → Hajduk Split II | 30 | (4) |
| 2020–2021 | Gorica | 32 | (3) |
| 2021–2025 | Dinamo Zagreb | 99 | (14) |
| 2021 | → Gorica (loan) | 17 | (3) |
| 2025 | → Aris (loan) | 12 | (2) |
| 2025– | Rio Ave | 30 | (2) |

International career^{‡}
| 2013 | Croatia U14 | 1 | (0) |
| 2014 | Croatia U15 | 5 | (1) |
| 2015–2016 | Croatia U17 | 14 | (5) |
| 2016–2017 | Croatia U19 | 8 | (3) |
| 2018–2019 | Croatia U20 | 2 | (1) |
| 2020–2021 | Croatia U21 | 10 | (2) |
- * Club domestic league appearances and goals as of 25 May 2026 ‡ National team caps and goals as of 20 June 2023

Dario Špikić (born 22 March 1999) is a Croatian professional footballer who plays as a winger for Primeira Liga club Rio Ave.

== Career ==
On 15 August 2025, Špikić signed a three-year contract with Primeira Liga club Rio Ave.

== Career statistics ==
As of match played 11 May 2025

Appearances and goals by club, season and competition
| Club | Season | League | | | Cup | | Europe | | Other | | Total | |
| Club | Season | Division | Apps | Goals | Apps | Goals | Apps | Goals | Apps | Goals | Apps | Goals |
|---|---|---|---|---|---|---|---|---|---|---|---|---|
| Dinamo Zagreb II | 2016–17 | 2. HNL | 9 | 2 | — | | — | | — | | 9 | 2 |
| Dinamo Zagreb II | 2017–18 | 2. HNL | 18 | 1 | — | | — | | — | | 18 | 1 |
| Dinamo Zagreb II | Total | | 27 | 3 | — | | — | | — | | 27 | 3 |
| Hajduk Split | 2018–19 | 1. HNL | 1 | 0 | — | | — | | — | | 1 | 0 |
| Hajduk Split II | 2018–19 | 1. HNL | 20 | 3 | — | | — | | — | | 20 | 3 |
| Hajduk Split II | 2019–20 | 1. HNL | 10 | 1 | — | | — | | — | | 10 | 1 |
| Hajduk Split II | Total | | 30 | 4 | — | | — | | — | | 30 | 4 |
| Gorica | 2019–20 | 1. HNL | 15 | 0 | 0 | 0 | — | | — | | 15 | 0 |
| Gorica | 2020–21 | 1. HNL | 24 | 3 | 3 | 1 | — | | — | | 27 | 4 |
| Gorica | Total | | 29 | 3 | 3 | 1 | — | | — | | 42 | 4 |
| Dinamo Zagreb | 2021–22 | 1. HNL | 23 | 2 | 2 | 0 | 4 (Note: Appearances in UEFA Europa League) | 0 | 0 | 0 | 29 | 2 |
| Dinamo Zagreb | 2022–23 | 1. HNL | 34 | 7 | 4 | 1 | 12 (Note: Appearances in UEFA Champions League) | 0 | 1 (Note: Appearance in Croatian Football Super Cup) | 0 | 53 | 8 |
| Dinamo Zagreb | 2023–24 | 1. HNL | 28 | 4 | 3 | 0 | 13 (Note: Four appearances and one goal in UEFA Champions League, two appearances and one goal in UEFA Europa League, seven appearances in UEFA Conference League) | 2 | 1 | 0 | 45 | 6 |
| Dinamo Zagreb | 2024–25 | 1. HNL | 14 | 2 | 1 | 1 | 6 | 1 | 0 | 0 | 21 | 4 |
| Dinamo Zagreb | Total | | 99 | 15 | 10 | 2 | 35 | 3 | 2 | 0 | 146 | 20 |
| Aris (loan) | 2024–25 | Superleague Greece | 12 | 2 | — | | — | | — | | 12 | 2 |
| Career total | | | 198 | 27 | 13 | 3 | 35 | 3 | 2 | 0 | 250 | 33 |
