= Demir Peco =

Bosnian footballer (born 1996)

Personal information
- Date of birth: 31 July 1996 (age 30)
- Place of birth: Monthey, Switzerland
- Height: 1.79 m (5 ft 10 in)
- Position: Right winger

Team information
- Current team: Velež Mostar
- Number: 14

Youth career
- –2015: Velež Mostar

Senior career*
Years	Team	Apps	(Gls)
2015–2016	Velež Mostar	18	(0)
2016–2020	Radnik Bijeljina	82	(9)
2020–2023	Varaždin	26	(1)
2021–2022	→ Velež Mostar (loan)	23	(2)
2023	Sloga Meridian	10	(0)
2023–	Velež Mostar	17	(1)

International career
2017–2018	Bosnia and Herzegovina U21	6	(0)
- * Club domestic league appearances and goals as of 1 June 2024

Demir Peco (born 31 July 1996) is a Bosnian professional footballer who plays as a right winger for Bosnian Premier League club Velež Mostar.

== International career ==
He also played for the Bosnia and Herzegovina U21 national team, making six appearances for the team but did not score a goal.

== Honours ==
Radnik Bijeljina

- Republika Srpska Cup: 2016–17, 2017–18, 2018–19

Velež Mostar

- Bosnian Cup: 2021–22
