= Domagoj Drožđek =

Croatian footballer

Personal information
- Date of birth: 20 March 1996 (age 30)
- Place of birth: Varaždin, Croatia
- Height: 1.80 m (5 ft 11 in)
- Positions: Left winger; striker

Team information
- Current team: Al-Khaldiya

Youth career
- 2004-2007: Varteks
- 2007-2008: Sloboda Tužno
- 2008-2009: Varteks
- 2009–2013: Dinamo Zagreb
- 2013–2015: Borussia Dortmund

Senior career*
Years	Team	Apps	(Gls)
2015–2016	Borussia Dortmund II	12	(0)
2016–2018	Varaždin	28	(16)
2018–2021	Lokomotiva Zagreb	38	(4)
2020–2021	→ Varaždin (loan)	28	(7)
2021–2023	Busan IPark	53	(3)
2023–2024	Varaždin	37	(7)
2024–2025	Apollon Limassol	15	(0)
2025–2026	Tractor	34	(14)
2026–	Al-Khaldiya	0	(0)

International career
2012	Croatia U16	4	(0)
2012	Croatia U17	1	(0)
2014	Croatia U19	3	(0)
- * Club domestic league appearances and goals as of 18 April 2025

Domagoj Drožđek (born 20 March 1996) is a Croatian professional footballer who plays as a winger for Iranian club Al-Khaldiya in Bahraini Premier League.

== Club career ==
Born in Varaždin to a Croatian father and German mother, Drožđek started his youth career with the academy of Varteks before joining Dinamo Zagreb. He moved to German club Borussia Dortmund in 2013, after agreeing to a three-and-a-half-year deal.

After a stint with Borussia Dortmund II, Drožđek returned to Croatia and joined third-tier club Varaždin on 1 September 2016. During the 2017–18 season, he scored 16 league goals (including a hat-trick against Gorica), and won the Best Player of the Tournament award.

On 30 August 2018, Drožđek joined first tier club Lokomotiva.

On 23 February 2021, Drožđek joined K League 2 side Busan IPark for an undisclosed fee.

== Honours ==
Tractor

- Persian Gulf Pro League: 2024–25
- Iranian Super Cup: 2025
