= Marko Stolnik =

Croatian footballer (born 1996)

Personal information
- Date of birth: 8 July 1996 (age 30)
- Place of birth: Varaždin, Croatia
- Height: 1.89 m (6 ft 2 in)
- Position: Centre-back

Team information
- Current team: Rudeš
- Number: 5

Youth career
- –2012: Varaždin
- 2012–2014: Dinamo Zagreb

Senior career*
Years	Team	Apps	(Gls)
2014–2018	Dinamo Zagreb	0	(0)
2015–2018	Dinamo Zagreb II	51	(1)
2014–2015	→ Sesvete (loan)	15	(0)
2016–2017	→ Lokomotiva (loan)	3	(0)
2018–2023	Varaždin	94	(2)
2022	→ Auda (loan)	17	(2)
2023–2024	UTA Arad	30	(0)
2024–2025	AEL Limassol	18	(1)
2025–2026	UTA Arad	6	(0)
2026–	Rudeš	0	(0)

International career
2012	Croatia U16	11	(1)
2012–2013	Croatia U17	16	(0)
2013–2014	Croatia U18	4	(1)
2014–2015	Croatia U19	8	(0)
2015	Croatia U20	1	(0)
- * Club domestic league appearances and goals as of 18 May 2026

Marko Stolnik (born 8 July 1996) is a Croatian professional footballer who plays as a centre-back for HNL club Rudeš.

== Honours ==
Varaždin

- 2. HNL: 2018–19
