= NK Podravina =

Croatian football club

- Full name: Nogometni klub Podravina Ludbreg
- Ground: Stadion NK Podravina
- Capacity: 5,000
- League: 1. ŽNL
| Home colours | Away colours |

NK Podravina is Croatian football club located in the city of Ludbreg. It is named after Podravina, Drava river basin region in Croatia.

Podravina made the round of 16 in the Croatian cup in the 2013–14 season, losing 3–1 to HNK Rijeka.

They are currently playing in the 4.HNL, the Croatian fourth tier.

== Honours ==
(Croatia) Treća HNL – East:

- Winners (1): 2010–11
