= 2020–21 Croatian First Football League =

Hrvatski Telekom Prva liga
- Season: 2020–21
- Dates: 14 August 2020 – 22 May 2021
- Champions: Dinamo Zagreb
- Relegated: Varaždin
- Champions League: Dinamo Zagreb
- Europa Conference League: Osijek; Rijeka; Hajduk Split
- Matches: 180
- Goals: 456 (2.53 per match)
- Top goalscorer: Ramón Miérez (22)
- Biggest home win: Dinamo Zagreb 6–0 Lokomotiva
- Biggest away win: Varaždin 0–5 Dinamo Zagreb
- Highest scoring: Gorica 3–4 Dinamo Zagreb; Gorica 3–4 Rijeka

The 2020–21 Croatian First Football League (also known as 1. HNL; officially styled Hrvatski Telekom Prva liga for sponsorship reasons) was the 30th season of the Croatian First Football League, the top national championship for men's association football teams in Croatia, since its establishment in 1992. The season started on 14 August 2020 and finished on 22 May 2021.

The season began with games being played behind closed doors due to the COVID-19 pandemic.

== Teams ==
On 20 May 2020, Croatian Football Federation announced that the first stage of licensing procedure for 2020–21 season was complete. For the 2020–21 Prva HNL, ten clubs were issued a top level license: Dinamo Zagreb, Gorica, Hajduk Split, Istra 1961, Lokomotiva, Osijek, Rijeka, Slaven Belupo, Šibenik and Varaždin. All of these clubs except Šibenik and Varaždin were also issued a license for participating in UEFA competitions. In the second stage of licensing, clubs that were not licensed in the first stage could appeal on the decision. On 17 June 2020, Croatian Football Federation announced that the licensing procedure for 2020–21 season was complete. Inter Zaprešić and Orijent 1919 were also issued a top level license after appeal process.

=== Stadia and locations ===
Dinamo Zagreb	Gorica	Hajduk Split	Istra 1961
Stadion Maksimir	Gradski stadion Velika Gorica	Stadion Poljud	Stadion Aldo Drosina
Capacity: 35,123	Capacity: 5,000	Capacity: 34,198	Capacity: 9,800
Lokomotiva	Locations of teams in 2020–21 Prva HNL		Osijek
Stadion Kranjčevićeva	Locations of teams in 2020–21 Prva HNL		Stadion Gradski vrt
Capacity: 5,350	Locations of teams in 2020–21 Prva HNL		Capacity: 17,061
Rijeka	Slaven Belupo	Šibenik	Varaždin
Stadion Rujevica	Stadion Ivan Kušek-Apaš	Stadion Šubićevac	Stadion Varteks
Capacity: 8,279	Capacity: 3,205	Capacity: 3,412	Capacity: 8,850

Team	City	Stadium	Capacity	Ref.
Dinamo Zagreb	Zagreb	Maksimir	35,123	
Gorica	Velika Gorica	ŠRC Velika Gorica	8,000	
Hajduk Split	Split	Poljud	34,198	
Istra 1961	Pula	Stadion Aldo Drosina	9,800	
Lokomotiva	Zagreb	Kranjčevićeva^{1}	5,350	
Osijek	Osijek	Gradski vrt	17,061	
Rijeka	Rijeka	Rujevica	8,279	
Slaven Belupo	Koprivnica	Stadion Ivan Kušek-Apaš	3,205	
Šibenik	Šibenik	Šubićevac	3,412	
Varaždin	Varaždin	Stadion Varteks	8,850	

- ^{1} Lokomotiva host their home matches at Stadion Kranjčevićeva. The stadium is originally the home ground of third-level side NK Zagreb.

Rank	Counties of Croatia	Number of teams	Club(s)
1	City of Zagreb	2	Dinamo Zagreb, Lokomotiva
2	Koprivnica-Križevci	1	Slaven Belupo
2	Osijek-Baranja	1	Osijek
2	Primorje-Gorski Kotar	1	Rijeka
2	Split-Dalmatia	1	Hajduk Split
2	Šibenik-Knin	1	Šibenik
2	Varaždin	1	Varaždin
2	Zagreb	1	Gorica
2	Istria	1	Istra 1961

=== Personnel and kits ===
Club	Manager	Captain	Kit manufacturer	Sponsors
Dinamo Zagreb	(Croatia) Damir Krznar	(North Macedonia) Arijan Ademi	Adidas	Lana grupa
Gorica	(Croatia) Siniša Oreščanin	(Bosnia and Herzegovina) Aleksandar Jovičić	FCG	—
Hajduk Split	(Italy) Paolo Tramezzani	(Croatia) Lovre Kalinić	Macron	Tommy
Istra 1961	(Croatia) Danijel Jumić	(Croatia) Slavko Blagojević	Kelme	Croatia Osiguranje
Lokomotiva	(Croatia) Samir Toplak	(Croatia) Josip Pivarić	Adidas	—
Osijek	(Croatia) Nenad Bjelica	(Croatia) Mile Škorić	2Rule	DOBRO, Stadler
Rijeka	(Croatia) Goran Tomić	(Croatia) Franko Andrijašević	Joma	Sava Osiguranje
Slaven Belupo	(Croatia) Tomislav Stipić	(Croatia) Goran Paracki	Adidas	Belupo
Šibenik	(Spain) Sergi Escobar	(Croatia) Marko Bulat	Jako	Krka National Park
Varaždin	(Croatia) Zoran Kastel	(Croatia) Marko Stolnik	Legea	Radnik, Derma

=== Managerial changes ===
Team	Outgoing manager	Manner of departure	Date of vacancy	Replaced by	Date of appointment	Position in table
Istra 1961	(Croatia) Ivan Prelec	Contract expired	14 July 2020	(Croatia) Danijel Jumić (caretaker)	16 July 2020	Pre-season
Hajduk Split	(Croatia) Igor Tudor	Signed by Juventus	21 August 2020	(Croatia) Hari Vukas	8 September 2020	3rd
Istra 1961	(Croatia) Danijel Jumić (caretaker)	Signing of Budicin	26 August 2020	(Croatia) Fausto Budicin	26 August 2020	10th
Osijek	(Croatia) Ivica Kulešević	Sacked	4 September 2020	(Croatia) Nenad Bjelica	5 September 2020	8th
Hajduk Split	(Croatia) Hari Vukas	Sacked	4 November 2020	(Croatia) Boro Primorac	4 November 2020	6th
Varaždin	(Croatia) Samir Toplak	Sacked	7 December 2020	(Croatia) Zoran Kastel	7 December 2020	9th
Gorica	(Lithuania) Valdas Dambrauskas	Signed by Ludogorets	3 January 2021	(Croatia) Siniša Oreščanin	3 January 2021	3rd
Lokomotiva	(Croatia) Goran Tomić	Resigned	9 January 2021	(Croatia) Jerko Leko	9 January 2021	8th
Hajduk Split	(Croatia) Boro Primorac	Removed from position	18 January 2021	(Italy) Paolo Tramezzani	18 January 2021	5th
Istra 1961	(Croatia) Fausto Budicin	Sacked	11 February 2021	(Croatia) Danijel Jumić	11 February 2021	10th
Rijeka	(Slovenia) Simon Rožman	Resigned	27 February 2021	(Croatia) Goran Tomić	1 March 2021	4th
Lokomotiva	(Croatia) Jerko Leko	Removed from position	13 March 2021	(Croatia) Samir Toplak	14 March 2021	10th
Dinamo Zagreb	(Croatia) Zoran Mamić	Resigned	15 March 2021	(Croatia) Damir Krznar	15 March 2021	1st
Šibenik	(Croatia) Krunoslav Rendulić	Sacked	23 March 2021	(Spain) Sergi Escobar	30 March 2021	6th

== League table ==
Pos	Team	Pld	W	D	L	GF	GA	GD	Pts	Qualification or relegation
1	Dinamo Zagreb (C)	36	26	7	3	84	28	+56	85	Qualification for the Champions League first qualifying round
2	Osijek	36	23	8	5	59	25	+34	77	Qualification for the Europa Conference League second qualifying round
3	Rijeka	36	18	7	11	51	46	+5	61	Qualification for the Europa Conference League second qualifying round
4	Hajduk Split	36	18	6	12	48	37	+11	60	Qualification for the Europa Conference League second qualifying round
5	Gorica	36	17	8	11	60	47	+13	59	
6	Šibenik	36	9	8	19	32	47	−15	35	
7	Slaven Belupo	36	7	13	16	36	53	−17	34	
8	Lokomotiva	36	7	9	20	29	60	−31	30	
9	Istra 1961	36	7	8	21	27	52	−25	29	
10	Varaždin (R)	36	6	10	20	30	61	−31	28	Relegation for the Croatian Second Football League

Source: PrvaHNL.hr
Rules for classification: 1) Points; 2) Head-to-head points; 3) Head-to-head goal difference; 4) Head-to-head goals scored (at home if two teams tied); 5) Goal difference; 6) Goals scored; 7) Play-off
(Note: Criteria 2-4 and 7 is only used if deciding champion, teams to international competition or teams for relegation and in that case criteria 6 will not be used).
(C) Champions; (R) Relegated

== Results ==
Each team plays home-and-away against every other team in the league twice, for a total of 36 matches each played.

Home \ Away	DIN	GOR	HAJ	IST	LOK	OSI	RIJ	SLA	ŠIB	VAR	DIN	GOR	HAJ	IST	LOK	OSI	RIJ	SLA	ŠIB	VAR
Dinamo Zagreb	—	3–2	3–1	5–0	6–0	4–1	0–2	3–3	1–2	4–0	—	1–0	2–0	1–0	2–0	1–0	2–0	3–0	1–0	2–2
Gorica	3–4	—	2–1	2–2	1–1	4–1	0–0	0–1	3–2	1–0	0–3	—	1–1	2–1	4–2	1–0	3–4	0–1	1–0	0–0
Hajduk Split	1–2	2–4	—	2–0	0–1	1–1	1–2	2–2	0–1	2–0	1–1	4–0	—	1–0	2–0	0–1	3–2	2–2	1–0	2–0
Istra 1961	0–1	1–1	1–0	—	3–1	1–4	1–2	2–1	1–0	0–1	0–1	0–2	0–1	—	1–1	0–2	1–2	1–0	3–2	0–1
Lokomotiva	1–1	1–2	1–2	0–0	—	0–3	1–0	2–1	0–4	2–2	0–2	0–3	0–2	0–1	—	0–2	2–3	3–1	1–0	4–0
Osijek	2–0	2–1	1–2	1–0	2–1	—	3–0	0–0	1–0	1–0	1–1	1–1	2–0	2–1	2–0	—	2–0	3–0	3–0	1–1
Rijeka	2–2	0–2	0–1	2–1	1–0	1–1	—	2–0	2–1	2–1	1–5	2–1	0–1	1–1	3–0	0–0	—	1–1	2–2	2–0
Slaven Belupo	1–5	1–2	0–2	5–1	0–0	0–1	1–3	—	0–0	2–0	0–2	0–1	1–1	1–1	0–0	2–2	0–2	—	2–2	1–0
Šibenik	0–2	1–3	0–1	1–0	3–2	0–2	2–0	0–3	—	0–1	1–1	1–1	0–2	1–0	0–0	0–4	0–1	2–0	—	0–0
Varaždin	1–2	1–5	4–2	1–1	1–1	0–1	2–1	1–2	1–3	—	0–5	2–1	0–1	1–1	0–1	2–3	2–3	1–1	1–1	—

Source: Prva HNL (in Croatian)
Legend: Blue = home team win; Yellow = draw; Red = away team win.

== Statistics ==
=== Top goalscorers ===
As of 22 May 2021

Rank	Player	Club	Goals
1	(Argentina) Ramón Miérez	Osijek	22
2	(Switzerland) Mario Gavranović	Dinamo Zagreb	17
3	(Croatia) Mislav Oršić	Dinamo Zagreb	16
4	(Croatia) Kristijan Lovrić	Gorica	15
5	(Croatia) Franko Andrijašević	Rijeka	13
6	(Australia) Deni Jurić	Šibenik	11
7	(Croatia) Mijo Caktaš	Hajduk Split	9
7	(Serbia) Ognjen Mudrinski	Gorica	9
7	(Croatia) Bruno Petković	Dinamo Zagreb	9
10	(Croatia) Ivan Krstanović	Slaven Belupo	8
10	(Croatia) Robert Murić	Rijeka	8

== Awards ==
=== Annual awards ===
Award	Club	Winner
Player of the Season	(Croatia) Bruno Petković	Dinamo Zagreb
Manager of the Season	(Croatia) Nenad Bjelica	Dinamo Zagreb
Young Player of the Season	(Croatia) Joško Gvardiol	Dinamo Zagreb

Team of the Year
Goalkeeper	(Croatia) Dominik Livaković (Dinamo Zagreb)			
Defence	(Brazil) Igor Silva (Osijek)	(Croatia) Mile Škorić (Osijek)	(Croatia) Joško Gvardiol (Dinamo Zagreb)	(Denmark) Rasmus Lauritsen (Dinamo Zagreb)
Midfield	(Croatia) Lovro Majer (Dinamo Zagreb)	(North Macedonia) Arijan Ademi (Dinamo Zagreb)	(Croatia) Luka Ivanušec (Dinamo Zagreb)	(Croatia) Mislav Oršić (Dinamo Zagreb)
Attack	(Croatia) Bruno Petković (Dinamo Zagreb)		(Argentina) Ramón Miérez (Osijek)	
