= 2017–18 Croatian Second Football League =

Druga HNL
- Season: 2017–18
- Champions: Gorica
- Promoted: Gorica
- Relegated: Novigrad
- Matches: 198
- Goals: 456 (2.3 per match)
- Top goalscorer: Domagoj Drožđek (16)
- Biggest home win: Varaždin 6–0 Solin
- Biggest away win: Novigrad 0–3 Hajduk Split II; Solin 0–3 Dinamo Zagreb II; Šibenik 0–3 Hajduk Split II
- Highest scoring: Gorica 5–2 Novigrad; Varaždin 4–3 Šibenik
- Total attendance: 87,758
- Average attendance: 443
- All statistics correct as of 20 May 2018.

The 2017–18 Croatian Second Football League (also known as Druga HNL and 2. HNL) was the 27th season of the Croatian Second Football League, the second level football competition for men's association football teams in Croatia, since its establishment in 1992. The season started on 18 August 2017 and ended on 23 May 2018.

The league is contested by twelve teams and played in a triple round robin format, with each team playing every other team three times over 33 rounds.

== Teams ==
On 21 April 2017, Croatian Football Federation announced that the first stage of licensing procedure for 2016–17 season was completed. For the 2017–18 Druga HNL, eight clubs outside of top level were issued a second level license: Rudeš, Solin, Gorica, Dinamo Zagreb II, Dugopolje. In the second stage of licensing procedure clubs that were not licensed in the first round appealed the decision. On 23 May 2017, all remaining Druga HNL were granted second division license, along with third level clubs Kustošija, Hajduk Split II, Varaždin and Trnje.

=== Stadia and locations ===
Locations of teams in 2017–18 Druga HNL

Club	Coach	City / Town	Stadium	2016–17 result	Capacity
Dinamo Zagreb II	Igor Jovičević	Zagreb	Stadion Hitrec-Kacian	5th	5,000
Dugopolje	Miroslav Bojko	Dugopolje	Stadion Hrvatski vitezovi	6th	5,200
Gorica	Ivan Prelec	Velika Gorica	Stadion Radnika	2nd	8,000
Hajduk Split II	Siniša Oreščanin	Split	Stadion Poljud second training ground	1st in (3. HNL South)	2,000
Hrvatski Dragovoljac	Igor Pamić	Zagreb	Stadion NŠC Stjepan Spajić	10th	5,000
Kustošija		Zagreb	Stadion NK Kustošija	2nd in (3. HNL West)	2,550
Lučko	Denis Bezer	Zagreb	Stadion Lučko	9th	1,500
Novigrad	Nino Bule	Novigrad	Stadion Lako	8th	1,000
Sesvete	Sergej Jakirović	Zagreb	Sv. Josip Radnik	4th	1,200
Solin	Mirko Labrović	Solin	Stadion pokraj Jadra	3rd	4,000
Šibenik	Borimir Perković	Šibenik	Stadion Šubićevac	7th	6,824
Varaždin	Mario Kovačević	Varaždin	Stadion Varteks	2nd in (3. HNL East)	8,850

=== Number of teams by county ===
Position	County	Number	Teams
1	City of Zagreb	5	Dinamo Zagreb II, Hrvatski Dragovoljac, Kustošija, Lučko and Sesvete
2	Split-Dalmatia	3	Dugopolje, Hajduk Split II and Solin
3	(Istria County) Istria	1	Novigrad
3	Šibenik-Knin	1	Šibenik
3	Varaždin	1	Varaždin
3	Zagreb County	1	Gorica

== League table ==
Pos	Team	Pld	W	D	L	GF	GA	GD	Pts	Qualification or relegation (Note: Dinamo Zagreb II and Hajduk Split II are ineligible for promotion)
1	Gorica (C, P)	33	18	8	7	44	29	+15	62	Promotion to the Croatian First Football League
2	Varaždin	33	18	7	8	50	32	+18	61 (Note: Head-to-head points: Varaždin 6, Dinamo 0)	Qualification to the promotion play-off
3	Dinamo Zagreb II	33	18	7	8	43	25	+18	61	Reserve teams are ineligible for promotion to the Croatian First Football League
4	Sesvete	33	16	6	11	46	38	+8	54	
5	Hajduk Split II	33	15	5	13	44	32	+12	50	Reserve teams are ineligible for promotion to the Croatian First Football League
6	Dugopolje	33	13	7	13	34	37	−3	46	
7	Šibenik	33	11	9	13	39	43	−4	42	
8	Kustošija	33	11	7	15	34	39	−5	40	
9	Solin	33	9	7	17	31	48	−17	34 (Note: Head-to-head points: Solin 9, Lučko 5, Dragovoljac 2)	
10	Lučko	33	8	10	15	27	40	−13	34	
11	Hrvatski Dragovoljac	33	8	10	15	37	48	−11	34	Qualification to the relegation play-off
12	Novigrad (R)	33	8	7	18	32	50	−18	31	Relegation to the Croatian Third Football League

Source: Druga-HNL.com
Rules for classification: 1) Points; 2) Head-to-head points; 3) Head-to-head goal difference; 4) Head-to-head away goals scored
(C) Champions; (P) Promoted; (R) Relegated

== Results ==
=== Matches 1–22 ===
Home \ Away	DIN	DUG	GOR	HAJ	HRV	KUS	LUČ	NOV	SES	SOL	ŠIB	VAR
Dinamo Zagreb II	—	4–0	1–0	1–2	1–0	2–1	3–0	1–0	0–2	1–0	3–1	1–2
Dugopolje	1–1	—	1–1	2–0	1–0	2–0	1–0	2–0	0–1	1–0	2–0	1–1
Gorica	0–2	2–1	—	3–0	1–0	1–0	1–1	5–2	1–0	2–0	1–0	1–2
Hajduk Split II	0–1	1–0	1–1	—	2–1	2–0	0–2	5–1	1–1	1–0	0–1	0–2
Hrvatski Dragovoljac	0–0	3–3	1–0	1–0	—	1–1	2–2	2–1	2–2	1–2	1–1	1–2
Kustošija	0–1	2–1	1–1	1–0	1–1	—	0–0	0–1	0–1	1–1	0–1	1–0
Lučko	1–1	0–0	0–2	2–2	1–1	2–1	—	0–2	2–0	1–3	1–0	3–0
Novigrad	1–1	1–2	0–1	0–3	1–0	0–2	0–0	—	2–3	2–0	1–2	1–1
Sesvete	1–1	0–1	0–0	2–1	0–1	2–0	2–0	2–1	—	0–1	2–2	3–2
Solin	0–3	0–1	0–0	1–0	4–1	1–2	0–1	1–1	4–2	—	2–1	0–0
Šibenik	0–0	1–2	1–2	0–3	3–1	1–0	0–0	1–1	1–0	1–1	—	2–1
Varaždin	2–0	1–0	3–0	2–2	0–2	1–1	1–0	0–0	0–2	2–0	0–0	—

Source: Druga HNL (in Croatian)
Legend: Blue = home team win; Yellow = draw; Red = away team win.
For upcoming matches, an "a" indicates there is an article about the rivalry between the two participants.

=== Matches 23–33 ===
Home \ Away	DIN	DUG	GOR	HAJ	HRV	KUS	LUČ	NOV	SES	SOL	ŠIB	VAR
Dinamo Zagreb II	—	—	1–0	0–2	—	4–0	—	—	0–2	2–1	2–0	—
Dugopolje	2–0	—	—	1–3	—	2–2	—	—	0–1	0–1	1–1	—
Gorica	—	2–1	—	—	3–1	—	2–0	1–0	—	—	1–1	4–2
Hajduk Split II	—	—	4–1	—	1–1	—	3–0	0–1	0–1	—	2–0	—
Hrvatski Dragovoljac	1–2	0–1	—	—	—	—	—	1–3	—	1–0	—	0–1
Kustošija	—	—	1–2	2–0	1–2	—	1–0	—	4–0	—	—	—
Lučko	0–1	2–0	—	—	2–3	—	—	1–0	—	—	—	2–3
Novigrad	1–1	3–0	—	—	—	0–1	—	—	—	3–2	—	0–1
Sesvete	—	—	0–1	—	2–2	—	2–1	5–0	—	—	3–2	0–2
Solin	—	—	1–1	0–2	—	2–4	0–0	—	3–2	—	—	—
Šibenik	—	—	—	—	2–1	2–3	3–0	3–2	—	2–0	—	—
Varaždin	2–1	2–0	—	0–1	—	2–0	—	—	—	6–0	4–3	—

Source: Druga HNL (in Croatian)
Legend: Blue = home team win; Yellow = draw; Red = away team win.
For upcoming matches, an "a" indicates there is an article about the rivalry between the two participants.

== Relegation play-offs ==
At the end of the season, eleventh placed team Hrvatski Dragovoljac was to contest a two-legged relegation play-off tie against RNK Split, runners-up of the 2017–18 Croatian Third Football League South Division. The matches, however, were not played because RNK Split did not receive a licence for Druga HNL.

=== First leg ===
30 May 2018

RNK Split	WNP	Hrvatski Dragovoljac

Stadion Park mladeži, Split

=== Second leg ===
2 June 2018

Hrvatski Dragovoljac	WNP	RNK Split

Stadion NŠC Stjepan Spajić, Zagreb

== Top scorers ==
As of 20 May 2018

Rank	Player	Club(s)	Goals
1	(Croatia) Domagoj Drožđek	Varaždin	16
2	(Croatia) Kristijan Lovrić	Lučko (2), Kustošija (11)	13
3	(Croatia) Valentino Majstorović	Hrvatski Dragovoljac	11
3	(Croatia) Borna Miklić	Dinamo Zagreb II	11
5	(Croatia) Ivan Delić	Hajduk Split II	9
5	(Croatia) Dejan Glavica	Varaždin	9
7	(Croatia) Ivan Božić	Dinamo Zagreb II	8
7	(Croatia) Ivan Mamut	Sesvete	8
7	(Croatia) Marko Tolić	Sesvete	8

== See also ==
- 2017–18 Croatian Football Cup
- 2017–18 Croatian First Football League
