= 2021–22 Croatian Second Football League =

Druga HNL
- Season: 2021–22
- Dates: 13 August 2021 – 28 May 2022
- Champions: Varaždin
- Promoted: Varaždin
- Relegated: Croatia Zmijavci; Sesvete; Osijek II; Opatija
- Matches: 240
- Goals: 627 (2.61 per match)
- Highest scoring: Martin Sekulić (11)
- All statistics correct as of 28 May 2022.

The 2021–22 Croatian Second Football League (also known as Druga HNL and 2. HNL) was the 31st season of the Croatian Second Football League, the second-level football competition for men's association football teams in Croatia, since its establishment in 1992. The season started on 13 August 2021 and ended on 28 May 2022.

The league was contested by 16 teams, two less than the previous season, and played in a double round robin format, with each team playing every other team twice over 30 rounds.

At the end of the season, the league will be reduced from 16 to 12 clubs. Reserve teams of first league clubs would not be allowed to play and were automatically moved to a lower rank.

== Teams ==
Locations of teams in 2021–22 Druga HNL

== League table ==
Pos	Team	Pld	W	D	L	GF	GA	GD	Pts	Qualification or relegation (Note: Dinamo Zagreb II and Osijek II were ineligible for promotion.)
1	Varaždin (C, P)	30	19	6	5	56	29	+27	63	Promotion to the HNL
2	Rudeš	30	17	5	8	56	27	+29	56	
3	Inter Zaprešić (X)	30	13	9	8	34	29	+5	48	Dissolved after the season (Note: Due to change in regulation, reserve teams of top level clubs (Dinamo Zagreb II and Osijek II) were not allowed to participate in second level from the following season. Later Dinamo II was dissolved.)
4	Jarun	30	11	11	8	46	38	+8	44	
5	Kustošija	30	11	9	10	39	35	+4	42	
6	Cibalia	30	11	8	11	44	42	+2	41	
7	Dinamo Zagreb II (X)	30	11	8	11	37	44	−7	41	Dissolved after the season
8	Solin	30	11	7	12	41	41	0	40	
9	Orijent 1919	30	12	4	14	44	49	−5	40	
10	Dugopolje	30	11	7	12	40	46	−6	40	
11	Dubrava	30	11	6	13	39	39	0	39	
12	BSK Bijelo Brdo	30	11	6	13	30	41	−11	39	
13	Croatia Zmijavci	30	11	5	14	32	43	−11	38	
14	Sesvete (R)	30	9	7	14	37	41	−4	34	Relegation to the 2. NL
15	Osijek II (R)	30	9	7	14	25	36	−11	34	Relegation to the 2. NL
16	Opatija (R)	30	6	7	17	27	47	−20	25	Relegation to the 2. NL

Updated to match(es) played on 28 May 2022. Source: Druga-HNL.com
Rules for classification: 1) Points; 2) Head-to-head points; 3) Head-to-head goal difference; 4) Head-to-head goals scored (at home if two teams tied); 5) Goal difference; 6) Goals scored; 7) Play-off
(Note: Criteria 2-4 and 7 is only used if deciding champion, teams for promotion or relegation and in that case criteria 6 will not be used).
(C) Champions; (P) Promoted; (R) Relegated; (X) Dissolved

== Results ==
Home \ Away	BSK	CIB	CRO	DIN	DUB	DUG	INT	JAR	KUS	OPA	ORI	OSI	RUD	SES	SOL	VAR
BSK Bijelo Brdo	—	1–1	2–0	2–1	1–0	2–0	0–3	2–2	2–3	4–1	1–4	0–2	2–1	0–0	1–0	1–0
Cibalia	1–0	—	1–0	5–2	2–0	1–0	1–1	2–1	1–1	2–2	5–1	1–0	2–1	0–1	5–3	1–1
Croatia Zmijavci	0–0	1–1	—	2–2	0–1	3–0	2–0	0–3	2–1	3–0	1–5	1–0	1–0	1–0	0–2	0–1
Dinamo Zagreb II	2–0	1–0	1–0	—	3–1	3–1	0–2	0–0	1–0	2–1	3–1	2–1	0–0	2–1	1–1	1–0
Dubrava	0–2	3–2	0–1	3–0	—	2–2	1–0	1–0	1–2	1–0	3–1	3–0	2–2	0–0	4–0	2–3
Dugopolje	3–1	2–1	1–2	2–1	1–0	—	2–2	0–2	1–0	3–2	1–1	0–0	3–2	2–1	3–1	0–0
Inter Zaprešić	4–2	1–1	0–0	1–1	2–0	1–4	—	0–1	2–1	1–0	1–0	2–0	1–0	2–0	0–1	0–1
Jarun	2–0	3–0	2–3	2–0	3–3	1–1	1–1	—	1–1	2–1	3–0	3–0	1–1	4–3	0–0	2–4
Kustošija	1–0	2–0	2–1	3–2	0–0	4–2	1–1	1–1	—	0–0	2–1	0–0	1–2	1–2	1–1	0–2
Opatija	0–0	2–1	2–1	0–0	0–2	0–2	3–0	0–1	2–1	—	0–1	1–2	3–1	1–1	1–1	2–2
Orijent 1919	0–1	2–1	3–2	4–1	2–1	2–2	1–1	3–2	0–3	3–0	—	0–1	0–1	0–3	1–4	3–1
Osijek II	1–1	2–1	1–2	1–1	0–1	2–0	1–2	0–0	0–1	0–2	1–0	—	2–1	0–3	3–2	0–0
Rudeš	3–1	4–0	2–0	3–2	4–1	4–0	3–0	3–0	2–0	3–0	2–2	1–0	—	3–0	1–0	3–0
Sesvete	0–1	1–1	2–2	4–0	0–0	1–0	1–2	3–2	0–2	2–1	0–1	1–4	0–0	—	4–0	2–3
Solin	3–0	2–4	3–0	2–1	4–2	2–1	0–0	1–1	2–1	1–0	0–1	0–0	1–2	4–0	—	0–2
Varaždin	3–0	1–0	5–1	1–1	2–1	2–1	0–1	4–0	3–3	4–0	2–1	4–1	2–1	2–1	1–0	—

Updated to match(es) played on 28 May 2022. Source: Druga HNL (in Croatian)
Legend: Blue = home team win; Yellow = draw; Red = away team win.
For upcoming matches, an "a" indicates there is an article about the rivalry between the two participants.

== See also ==
- 2021–22 Croatian First Football League
