= NK Varaždin (2012) =

Croatian football club

Varaždin
- Full name: Nogometni klub Varaždin
- Founded: 1 July 2012; 14 years ago
- Ground: Stadion Varteks
- Capacity: 8,818
- President: Dražen Vitez
- Head coach: Nikola Šafarić
- League: Croatian Football League
- 2025–26: 3rd of 10
- Website: varazdin.club
Home colours	Away colours	Third colours

Nogometni klub Varaždin, commonly referred to as NK Varaždin, is a Croatian professional football club based in Varaždin. They compete in the Croatian Football League (HNL), the top tier of Croatian football.

== History ==
The club was founded as FC Varaždin Football School (Croatian: NK Varaždin Škola nogometa, Varaždin ŠN) as a phoenix club of NK Varaždin (1931–2015) in 2012 after the latter's suspension; the club was dissolved during the second part of the 2011–12 season due to high financial debt. Legally, the two clubs' track records and honours are kept separate by the Croatian Football Federation, but the 2012 club is a continuation of the older club, which did return to competition in 2013, overlapping with the life of Varaždin ŠN. However, the older club finally declared bankruptcy and dissolved in 2015, leaving the name NK Varaždin available once again.

After steadily progressing through the levels of the Croatian football league system, NK Varaždin competed in the top division for the first time in the 2019–20 season, where they finished in eighth place. However, they were relegated the following season after finishing bottom of the table.

== Players ==
=== Current squad ===
As of 24 September 2026

Note: Flags indicate national team as defined under FIFA eligibility rules; some limited exceptions apply. Players may hold more than one non-FIFA nationality.

No.	Pos.	Nation	Player
1	GK	SCO	Robby McCrorie
3	DF	BIH	Elvir Duraković
4	MF	CRO	Luka Škaričić
5	DF	CRO	Sven Lesjak
6	MF	CRO	David Puclin
7	MF	CRO	Matej Vuk
8	MF	CRO	Tomislav Duvnjak
9	FW	BIH	Stipe Jurić
10	FW	MNE	Aleksa Latković
11	MF	NGR	Emmanuel Uchegbu (on loan from Crown Legacy FC)
12	DF	CRO	Petar Bočkaj
13	DF	MKD	Mario Mladenovski
14	DF	CRO	Roberto Punčec (captain)
15	MF	BIH	Silvio Ilinković

No.	Pos.	Nation	Player
16	DF	CRO	Novak Tepšić
17	FW	CRO	Valentin Akrap
19	MF	CRO	Luka Lukanić
20	DF	SLO	Gregor Sikošek
21	MF	CRO	Ivan Posavec
22	MF	CRO	Luka Mamić
23	DF	CRO	Frane Maglica
24	MF	CRO	Mario Marina (vice-captain)
28	MF	CRO	Ivan Canjuga
30	DF	CRO	Luka Posinković
33	GK	CRO	Josip Silić
38	FW	CPV	Iuri Tavares
44	DF	CRO	Mateo Barać

=== Dual registration ===
Note: Flags indicate national team as defined under FIFA eligibility rules; some limited exceptions apply. Players may hold more than one non-FIFA nationality.

No. / Pos. / Nation / Player; 18 / FW / ANG / Filipe Quissequel (at (Croatia) Kustošija)	No. / Pos. / Nation / Player; 29 / DF / CRO / Domagoj Begonja (at (Croatia) Kustošija)

=== Out on loan ===
Note: Flags indicate national team as defined under FIFA eligibility rules; some limited exceptions apply. Players may hold more than one non-FIFA nationality.

No.	Pos.	Nation	Player
19	MF	AZE	Rufat Abdullazade (at (Israel) Ironi Kiryat Shmona until 30 June 2027)

== Season-by-season record ==
Season	League									Cup	European competitions	Top scorer	
Season	Division	Pld	W	D	L	GF	GA	Pts	Pos.	Cup	European competitions	Player	Goals
2012–13	2. ŽNL Varaždin County East	22	14	3	5	71	24	45	3rd	DNQ			
2013–14	2. ŽNL Varaždin County East	22	14	4	4	62	24	46	3rd ↑	DNQ			
2014–15	1. ŽNL Varaždin County	30	21	5	4	81	38	68	1st ↑	DNQ			
2015–16	3. HNL East	30	10	4	16	40	47	34	11th	DNQ			
2016–17	3. HNL East	30	18	6	6	53	27	60	2nd ↑^{[1]}	R32			
2017–18	2. HNL	33	18	7	8	50	32	61	2nd	R32			
2018–19	2. HNL	26	16	3	7	40	30	51	1st ↑	R16		Leon Benko	22
2019–20	1. HNL	36	9	9	18	29	50	36	8th	R16		Domagoj Drožđek; Dejan Glavica	6
2020–21	1. HNL	36	6	10	20	30	61	28	10th ↓	R16		Jorge Obregón	7
2021–22	2. HNL	30	19	6	5	56	29	63	1st ↑	R16		Igor Postonjski; Michele Šego	7
2022–23	HNL	36	12	10	14	41	51	46	6th	R16		Fran Brodić	12
2023–24	HNL	36	10	12	14	39	47	42	6th	QF		Fran Brodić; Domagoj Drožđek; Igor Postonjski	7
2024–25	HNL	36	11	16	9	28	24	49	4th	R16		Dimitar Mitrovski	8

Key

- DNQ = Did not qualify
- R32 = Round of 32
- R16 = Round of 16

=== Notes ===
1. ^{a} : Although NK Međimurje finished top of the 2016–17 3. HNL East, they did not apply for promotion, so runners-up NK Varaždin gained promotion to 2. HNL.

== European record ==
=== Summary ===
Competition	Pld	W	D	L	GF	GA	Last season played
UEFA Conference League	4	2	0	2	5	7	2026–27
Total	4	2	0	2	5	7	

Last updated on 30 July 2026.
Pld = Matches played; W = Matches won; D = Matches drawn; L = Matches lost; GF = Goals for; GA = Goals against

=== By season ===
Season	Competition	Round	Opponent	Home	Away	Agg.
2025–26	Conference League	QR2	(Portugal) Santa Clara	2–1	0–2	2–3
2026–27	Conference League	QR2	(Czech Republic) Jablonec	3–2	0–2	3–4
