= 2019–20 GNK Dinamo Zagreb season =

Dinamo Zagreb
2019–20 season
- Chairman: Mirko Barišić
- Head coach: Nenad Bjelica; Igor Jovićević; Zoran Mamić (interim)
- Stadium: Stadion Maksimir
- Prva HNL: 1st
- Croatian Football Cup: Quarter-finals
- UEFA Champions League: Group stage
- Croatian Super Cup: Winners
- Top goalscorer: League: Mislav Oršić (13); All: Mislav Oršić (21)
- Highest home attendance: 29,385
- Biggest win: Karlovac 1919 0–7 Dinamo Zagreb
- Biggest defeat: Dinamo Zagreb 1–4 Manchester City
| Home colours | Away colours | Third colours |

The 2019–20 season was GNK Dinamo Zagreb's 29th season in the Croatian First Division and 107th year in existence as a football club. In addition to the domestic league, Dinamo Zagreb participated in this season's editions of the Croatian Cup, the Croatian Super Cup, and the UEFA Champions League. The season covered the period from 1 July 2019 to 24 July 2020.

== Players ==
=== Current squad ===
As of 25 January 2020

Note: Flags indicate national team as defined under FIFA eligibility rules; some limited exceptions apply. Players may hold more than one non-FIFA nationality.

| No. | Pos. | Nation | Player |
|---|---|---|---|
| 1 | GK | CRO | Danijel Zagorac (3rd captain) |
| 5 | MF | MKD | Arijan Ademi (Captain) |
| 8 | MF | BIH | Izet Hajrović |
| 9 | FW | SRB | Komnen Andrić |
| 10 | MF | CRO | Lovro Majer |
| 11 | FW | SUI | Mario Gavranović |
| 14 | MF | BIH | Amer Gojak |
| 17 | MF | CRO | Luka Ivanušec |
| 18 | MF | CRO | Antonio Marin |
| 19 | DF | SUI | François Moubandje |
| 20 | MF | NGR | Iyayi Atiemwen |
| 21 | FW | CRO | Bruno Petković |

| No. | Pos. | Nation | Player |
|---|---|---|---|
| 22 | DF | CRO | Marin Leovac |
| 27 | MF | CRO | Nikola Moro |
| 28 | DF | FRA | Kévin Théophile-Catherine |
| 30 | DF | SLO | Petar Stojanović |
| 39 | MF | CRO | Robert Mišković |
| 40 | GK | CRO | Dominik Livaković (Vice-captain) |
| 55 | DF | CRO | Dino Perić |
| 66 | DF | AUT | Emir Dilaver |
| 77 | FW | CRO | Sandro Kulenović |
| 92 | MF | POL | Damian Kądzior |
| 99 | FW | CRO | Mislav Oršić |

=== Out on loan ===
Note: Flags indicate national team as defined under FIFA eligibility rules; some limited exceptions apply. Players may hold more than one non-FIFA nationality.

| No. | Pos. | Nation | Player |
|---|---|---|---|
| 2 | DF | IRI | Sadegh Moharrami (at (Croatia) Lokomotiva) |
| 6 | DF | POR | Ivo Pinto (at (Portugal) Famalicão) |
| 17 | MF | BIH | Luka Menalo (at (Slovenia) Olimpija Ljubljana) |
| 20 | MF | CRO | Neven Đurasek (at (Croatia) Varaždin) |
| 23 | GK | CRO | Dinko Horkaš (at (Bosnia and Herzegovina) Zrinjski Mostar) |

| No. | Pos. | Nation | Player |
|---|---|---|---|
| 25 | FW | CRO | Mario Ćuže (at (Croatia) Istra 1961) |
| 31 | DF | CRO | Marko Lešković (at (Croatia) Lokomotiva) |
| 87 | DF | CRO | Vinko Soldo (at (Finland) KuPS) |
| 97 | MF | CRO | Bojan Knežević (at (Slovenia) Olimpija Ljubljana) |
| 98 | GK | CRO | Adrian Šemper (at (Italy) Chievo) |

== Pre-season and friendlies ==
Win Draw Loss

| 22 June 2019 Friendly | Dinamo Zagreb (Croatia) | 2–1 | (Slovenia) Olimpija Ljubljana | Zagreb, Croatia |
| 17:00 CEST (UTC+2) | | | | Stadium: Stadion Maksimir |

| 27 June 2019 Friendly | Cracovia (Poland) | 1–0 | (Croatia) Dinamo Zagreb | Murska Sobota, Slovenia |
| 18:00 CEST (UTC+2) | | | | Stadium: Fazanerija City Stadium |

| 2 July 2019 Friendly | Austria Klagenfurt | 0–2 | (Croatia) Dinamo Zagreb | Murska Sobota, Slovenia |
| 18:30 CEST (UTC+2) | | | | Stadium: Fazanerija City Stadium |

| 3 July 2019 Friendly | Dekani (Slovenia) | 0–10 | (Croatia) Dinamo Zagreb | Murska Sobota, Slovenia |
| 18:30 CEST (UTC+2) | | | Kądzior 19', 22'; Andrić 38' (pen.), 72' (pen.), 73', 81'; Marin 51'; Baturina 62'; Majer 84'; Ćuže 88' | Stadium: Fazanerija City Stadium |

| 6 July 2019 Friendly | Dinamo Zagreb (Croatia) | 2–2 | (Russia) Orenburg | Murska Sobota, Slovenia |
| 12:00 CEST (UTC+2) | | | | Stadium: Fazanerija City Stadium |

| 11 October 2019 Friendly | Sloboda Tuzla (Bosnia and Herzegovina) | 1–1 | (Croatia) Dinamo Zagreb | Tuzla, Bosnia and Herzegovina |
| 17:30 CEST (UTC+2) | Smajić 27' (pen.) | | Smajić 37' (o.g.) | Stadium: Tušanj City Stadium |

| 18 January 2020 Friendly | Dinamo Zagreb (Croatia) | 2–1 | (Czech Republic) Slovácko | Rovinjsko Selo, Croatia |
| 16:00 CET (UTC+1) | Leovac 54'; Majer 83' | | Kalabiška 55'; Havlík (red card) 87' | Stadium: Stadion Rovinjsko selo |

| 25 January 2020 Friendly | Dinamo Zagreb (Croatia) | 4–0 | (Slovenia) Koper | Rovinj, Croatia |
| 13:00 CET (UTC+1) | Petković 45+1' (pen.); Kądzior 49'; Théophile-Catherine (yellow card) 62'; Gojak 66'; Moro 79' |

| 2 February 2020 Friendly | Dinamo Zagreb (Croatia) | 2–0 | (Slovenia) Krško | Zagreb, Croatia |
| 11:00 CET (UTC+1) | Andrić 62', 67' | | | Stadium: Stadion Maksimir |

| 22 May 2020 Friendly | Dinamo Zagreb (Croatia) | 2–1 | (Croatia) Osijek | Zagreb, Croatia |
| 19:00 CEST (UTC+2) | Kulenović 20'; Karrica 78' | | Špoljarić 79' | Stadium: Stadion Maksimir |

| 23 May 2020 Friendly | Dinamo Zagreb (Croatia) | 2–3 | (Croatia) Gorica | Zagreb, Croatia |
| 18:00 CEST (UTC+2) | Majer 20'; Hajrović (yellow card) 63'; Franjić (yellow card) 71'; Ćuže 83' | | Kalik (yellow card) 24'; Suk 39'; Babec (yellow card) 60'; Ndiaye 61'; Golubickas 79' | Stadium: Stadion Maksimir |

| 29 May 2020 Friendly | Dinamo Zagreb (Croatia) | 4–1 | (Croatia) Inter Zaprešić | Zagreb, Croatia |
| 18:00 CEST (UTC+2) | Gojak 17'; Ademi 35'; Kądzior 49'; Oršić 64' | | Mamut 10' | Stadium: Stadion Maksimir |

| 29 May 2020 Friendly | Dinamo Zagreb (Croatia) | 5–2 | (Croatia) Dinamo Zagreb II | Zagreb, Croatia |
| 20:00 CEST (UTC+2) | Ivanušec 4'; Kulenović 7'; Majer (yellow card) 16', (goal) 71'; Ćuže 25'; Marin 62' | | Tueto 50'; Kim 55' | Stadium: Stadion Maksimir |

== Competitions ==
=== Overview ===
| Competition | First match | Last match | Starting round | Final position | Record | | | | | | | |
| Competition | First match | Last match | Starting round | Final position | Pld | W | D | L | GF | GA | GD | Win % |
|---|---|---|---|---|---|---|---|---|---|---|---|---|
| Prva HNL | 19 July 2019 | 24 July 2020 | Matchday 1 | Winners | 36 | 25 | 5 | 6 | 62 | 20 | +42 | 69.44 |
| Croatian Cup | 25 September 2019 | 5 February 2020 | First round | Quarter-finals | 3 | 2 | 0 | 1 | 10 | 1 | +9 | 66.67 |
| Croatian Super Cup | 13 July 2019 | | Final | Winners | 1 | 1 | 0 | 0 | 1 | 0 | +1 | 100.00 |
| Champions League | 23 July 2019 | 11 December 2019 | Second qualifying round | Group stage | 12 | 5 | 4 | 3 | 21 | 13 | +8 | 41.67 |
| Total | | | | | 52 | 33 | 9 | 10 | 94 | 34 | +60 | 63.46 |

Last updated: 24 July 2020
Source: Soccerway

=== Prva HNL ===
==== League table ====
| Pos | Team | Pld | W | D | L | GF | GA | GD | Pts | Qualification or relegation |
|---|---|---|---|---|---|---|---|---|---|---|
| 1 | Dinamo Zagreb (C) | 36 | 25 | 5 | 6 | 62 | 20 | +42 | 80 | Qualification for the Champions League second qualifying round |
| 2 | Lokomotiva | 36 | 19 | 8 | 9 | 57 | 38 | +19 | 65 | Qualification for the Champions League second qualifying round |
| 3 | Rijeka | 36 | 19 | 7 | 10 | 58 | 42 | +16 | 64 | Qualification for the Europa League third qualifying round |
| 4 | Osijek | 36 | 17 | 11 | 8 | 47 | 29 | +18 | 62 | Qualification for the Europa League second qualifying round |
| 5 | Hajduk Split | 36 | 18 | 6 | 12 | 60 | 41 | +19 | 60 | Qualification for the Europa League second qualifying round |

Source: PrvaHNL.hr
Rules for classification: 1) Points; 2) Head-to-head points; 3) Head-to-head goal difference; 4) Head-to-head goals scored (at home if two teams tied); 5) Goal difference; 6) Goals scored; 7) Play-off
(Note: Criteria 2-4 and 7 is only used if deciding champion, teams to international competition or teams for relegation and in that case criteria 6 will not be used).
(C) Champions

==== Results summary ====
| Overall | | | | | | | | Home | | | | | | Away | | | | | |
| Pld | W | D | L | GF | GA | GD | Pts | W | D | L | GF | GA | GD | W | D | L | GF | GA | GD |
|---|---|---|---|---|---|---|---|---|---|---|---|---|---|---|---|---|---|---|---|
| 36 | 25 | 5 | 6 | 62 | 20 | +42 | 80 | 15 | 2 | 1 | 34 | 9 | +25 | 10 | 3 | 5 | 28 | 11 | +17 |

Last updated: 24 July 2020.
Source: Prva HNL

==== Result round by round ====
| Round | 1 | 2 | 3 | 4 | 5 | 6 | 7 | 8 | 9 | 10 | 11 | 12 | 13 | 14 | 15 | 16 | 17 | 18 | 19 | 20 | 21 | 22 | 23 | 24 | 25 | 26 | 27 | 28 | 29 | 30 | 31 | 32 | 33 | 34 | 35 | 36 |
|---|---|---|---|---|---|---|---|---|---|---|---|---|---|---|---|---|---|---|---|---|---|---|---|---|---|---|---|---|---|---|---|---|---|---|---|---|
| Ground | H | A | H | A | A | H | A | H | A | A | H | A | H | H | A | H | A | H | H | A | H | A | H | H | A | H | A | A | H | A | H | A | A | H | A | H |
| Result | W | W | W | D | W | W | L | W | L | W | W | W | W | W | D | W | W | W | W | W | W | L | W | W | W | W | W | L | W | D | D | W | L | L | D | W |
| Position | 1 | 1 | 1 | 1 | 1 | 1 | 2 | 2 | 3 | 3 | 2 | 1 | 1 | 1 | 1 | 1 | 1 | 1 | 1 | 1 | 1 | 1 | 1 | 1 | 1 | 1 | 1 | 1 | 1 | 1 | 1 | 1 | 1 | 1 | 1 | 1 |

Updated to match(es) played on 24 July 2020. Source: Prva HNL
A = Away; H = Home; W = Win; D = Draw; L = Loss

==== Matches ====
| 19 July 2019 1 | Dinamo Zagreb | 3–0 | Lokomotiva | Zagreb |
| 21:00 CEST (UTC+2) | Kądzior 17'; Oršić 45+1'; Gojak (yellow card) 49'; Petković 85' | Report | Arežina (yellow card) 1'; Kolinger (yellow card) 12'; Petrak (yellow card) 42'; Mbodji (yellow card) 67' | Stadium: Stadion Maksimir; Attendance: 3,132; Referee: Igor Pajač |

| 27 July 2019 2 | Slaven Belupo | 0–3 | Dinamo Zagreb | Koprivnica |
| 21:00 CEST (UTC+2) | Božić (yellow card) 11'; Glavčić (yellow card) 26'; Radivojević (yellow card) 43'; Mateus (yellow card) 86' | Report | Petković 4'; Lešković (yellow card) 36'; Atiemwen 40'; Majer (yellow card) 63'; Moro 89' | Stadium: Stadion Ivan Kušek-Apaš; Attendance: 2,517; Referee: Marko Matoc |

| 2 August 2019 3 | Dinamo Zagreb | 3–1 | Gorica | Zagreb |
| 21:00 CEST (UTC+2) | Olmo 22'; Moro 57'; Gojak 83'; Atiemwen (yellow card) 90+3' | Report | Čelić (yellow card) 15'; Lovrić (yellow card) 40', (goal) 86'; Muhammed (yellow card) 61'; Suk (yellow card) 78'; Marina (yellow card) 84' | Stadium: Stadion Maksimir; Attendance: 2,676; Referee: Mario Zebec |

| 9 August 2019 4 | Osijek | 0–0 | Dinamo Zagreb | Osijek |
| 21:00 CEST (UTC+2) | Žaper (yellow card) 51'; Šutalo (yellow card) 59'; Bočkaj (yellow card) 79'; Škorić (yellow card) 86'; Marić (yellow card) 90+1' | Report | Théophile-Catherine (yellow card) 67' | Stadium: Stadion Gradski vrt Attendance: 5,127; Referee: Mario Zebec |

| 16 August 2019 5 | Inter Zaprešić | 1–2 | Dinamo Zagreb | Zaprešić |
| 21:00 CEST (UTC+2) | Tsonev 8', (yellow card) 75'; Vego (yellow card) 16'; Galić (yellow card) 33' (yellow-red card) 49' | Report | Lešković (yellow card) 26'; Théophile-Catherine (yellow card) 30'; Atiemwen 40', 50', (yellow card) 45+1'; Majer (yellow card) 84' | Stadium: Stadion ŠRC Zaprešić; Attendance: 2,686; Referee: Damir Batinić |

| 31 August 2019 7 | Hajduk Split | 1–0 | Dinamo Zagreb | Split |
| 18:30 CEST (UTC+2) | Jradi 56', (yellow card) 58' (yellow-red card) 80'; Caktaš (yellow card) 68'; Ljubić (yellow card) 90+4' | Report | Leovac (yellow card) 55'; Hajrović (yellow card) 71'; Dilaver (red card) 75'; Ademi (yellow card) 76' (yellow-red card) 76'; Gavranović (yellow card) 84' | Stadium: Stadion Poljud; Attendance: 29,359; Referee: Damir Batinić (Osijek) |

| 13 September 2019 8 | Dinamo Zagreb | 1–0 | Istra 1961 | Zagreb |
| 18:00 CEST (UTC+2) | Gavranović 53'; Ivanušec (yellow card) 73' | Report | Bušnja (yellow card) 72' | Stadium: Stadion Maksimir; Attendance: 2,700; Referee: Igor Pajač (Sveti Ivan Zelina) |

| 21 September 2019 9 | Varaždin | 1–0 | Dinamo Zagreb | Varaždin |
| 19:00 CEST (UTC+2) | Lisakovich (yellow card) 50'; Guera Djou 62'; Tkalčić (yellow card) 86'; Nevistić (yellow card) 90'; Stolnik (yellow card) 90+4' | Report | Pinto (yellow card) 26'; Hajrović (yellow card) 31'; Perić (yellow card) 63'; Moubandje (yellow card) 90+1'; Stojanović (yellow card) 90+3' | Stadium: Stadion Varteks; Attendance: 4,922; Referee: Marko Matoc (Zaprešić) |

| 27 September 2019 10 | Lokomotiva | 0–4 | Dinamo Zagreb | Zagreb |
| 19:00 CEST (UTC+2) | Tolić (yellow card) 82' | Report | Kądzior 10'; Olmo 58'; Oršić 59'; Gavranović 74' | Stadium: Stadion Kranjčevićeva; Attendance: 2,983; Referee: Ivan Bebek |

| 5 October 2019 11 | Dinamo Zagreb | 1–0 | Slaven Belupo | Zagreb |
| 17:30 CEST (UTC+2) | Petković 5' (pen.) | Report | Nowak (yellow card) 5'; Radivojević (yellow card) 53' | Stadium: Stadion Maksimir; Attendance: 1,511; Referee: Tihomir Pejin |

| 18 October 2019 12 | Gorica | 2–4 | Dinamo Zagreb | Velika Gorica |
| 17:00 CEST (UTC+2) | Lovrić 55'; Muhammed (yellow card) 59'; Čelić (yellow card) 77'; Suk 77' | Report | Oršić 25', 49', 61'; Kądzior 27'; Šitum (yellow card) 54'; Perić (yellow card) 65' (yellow-red card) 89' | Stadium: Stadion Radnik; Attendance: 4,003; Referee: Mario Zebec |

| 27 October 2019 13 | Dinamo Zagreb | 1–0 | Osijek | Zagreb |
| 16:30 CET (UTC+1) | Kądzior 42'; Théophile-Catherine (yellow card) 86' | Report | Ndockyt (yellow card) 40'; Škorić (yellow card) 57'; Mbakogu (yellow card) 83'; Oliveira (yellow card) 87' | Stadium: Stadion Maksimir; Attendance: 7,029; Referee: Igor Pajač |

| 2 November 2019 14 | Dinamo Zagreb | 1–0 | Inter Zaprešić | Zagreb |
| 16:00 CET (UTC+1) | Gvardiol 48' | Report | Mamut (yellow card) 42' | Stadium: Stadion Maksimir; Attendance: 2,404; Referee: Duje Strukan |

| 10 November 2019 15 | Rijeka | 0–5 | Dinamo Zagreb | Rijeka |
| 17:30 CET (UTC+1) | Mamić (yellow card) 11'; Andrijašević (yellow card) 13'; Lepinjica (yellow card) 51' | Report | Ivanušec 14'; Oršić 18', 26', 70'; Stojanović 20'; Kądzior (yellow card) 21'; Leovac (yellow card) 37'; Perić (yellow card) 50' | Stadium: Stadion Rujevica; Attendance: 5,517; Referee: Mario Zebec |

| 22 November 2019 16 | Dinamo Zagreb | 1–1 | Hajduk Split | Zagreb |
| 18:00 CET (UTC+1) | Ismajli 12' (o.g.); Leovac (yellow card) 44'; Hajrović (yellow card) 90+3' | Report | Simić (yellow card) 15'; Ismajli (yellow card) 23'; Kalik (yellow card) 27'; Caktaš 45+1' (pen.) | Stadium: Stadion Maksimir; Attendance: 15,757; Referee: Ivan Bebek |

| 30 November 2019 17 | Istra 1961 | 1–2 | Dinamo Zagreb | Pula |
| 17:00 CET (UTC+1) | Regan (yellow card) 25'; Galilea (yellow card) 57'; Ćuže 90+1' (pen.) | Report | Kądzior 22'; Šitum (yellow card) 42'; Oršić 49'; Zagorac (yellow card) 90'; Moro (yellow card) 90+3' | Stadium: Stadion Aldo Drosina; Attendance: 2,462; Referee: Duje Strukan |

| 6 December 2019 18 | Dinamo Zagreb | 1–0 | Varaždin | Zagreb |
| 18:00 CET (UTC+1) | Moubandje (yellow card) 64'; Gavranović 77' | Report | Senić (yellow card) 55'; Stolnik (yellow card) 76' | Stadium: Stadion Maksimir; Attendance: 1,471; Referee: Marin Vidulin |

| 14 December 2019 19 | Dinamo Zagreb | 1–0 | Lokomotiva | Zagreb |
| 17:30 CET (UTC+1) | Pinto (yellow card) 58'; Oršić 67' | Report | Çokaj (yellow card) 25'; Tolić (yellow card) 77' | Stadium: Stadion Maksimir; Attendance: 1,935; Referee: Duje Strukan |

| 18 December 2019 6 | Dinamo Zagreb | 3–0 | Rijeka | Zagreb |
| 18:00 CET (UTC+1) | Olmo 9', (yellow card) 36'; Oršić 17'; Perić (yellow card) 23'; Petković 56' (pen.) | Report | Smolčić (yellow card) 49' | Stadium: Stadion Maksimir; Attendance: 3,968; Referee: Tihomir Pejin |

| 1 February 2020 20 | Slaven Belupo | 0–2 | Dinamo Zagreb | Koprivnica |
| 17:30 CET (UTC+1) | Zirdum (yellow card) 17'; Kamber (yellow card) 45+1' | Report | Petković (yellow card) 29', (goal) 53'; Gojak (yellow card) 36'; Ivanušec (yellow card) 40', (goal) 45+3'; Stojanović (yellow card) 45' | Stadium: Stadion Ivan Kušek-Apaš; Attendance: 2,323; Referee: Mario Zebec |

| 9 February 2020 21 | Dinamo Zagreb | 2–0 | Gorica | Zagreb |
| 17:30 CET (UTC+1) | Théophile-Catherine 72'; Kądzior 86' | Report | Suk (yellow card) 11' (yellow-red card) 50'; Špikić (yellow card) 44'; Krizmanić (yellow card) 69' | Stadium: Stadion Maksimir; Attendance: 2,415; Referee: Dario Bel |

| 16 February 2020 22 | Osijek | 1–0 | Dinamo Zagreb | Osijek |
| 15:00 CET (UTC+1) | Marić (yellow card) 60', (goal) 77' (pen.); Žaper (yellow card) 67'; Grezda (yellow card) 90+2'; Silva (yellow card) 90+4' | Report | Dilaver (yellow card) 45' (yellow-red card) 67'; Stojanović (yellow card) 56' (yellow-red card) 90+6' | Stadium: Stadion Gradski vrt Attendance: 6,450; Referee: Mario Zebec |

| 23 February 2020 23 | Dinamo Zagreb | 3–2 | Inter Zaprešić | Zagreb |
| 15:00 CET (UTC+1) | Leovac 6'; Kądzior 60'; Gavranović 72' | Report | Bosec 39'; Martic (yellow card) 59'; Savić (yellow card) 65'; Andrić 90+1'; Mitrović (yellow card) 90+2' | Stadium: Stadion Maksimir; Attendance: 2,378; Referee: Marin Vidulin |

| 29 February 2020 24 | Dinamo Zagreb | 4–0 | Rijeka | Zagreb |
| 17:30 CET (UTC+1) | Ademi 1', (yellow card) 39'; Kądzior 81', (yellow card) 82'; Oršić 85'; Gojak 90+3' | Report | Capan (yellow card) 23' | Stadium: Stadion Maksimir; Attendance: 5,497; Referee: Duje Strukan |

| 4 March 2020 25 | Hajduk Split | 0–2 | Dinamo Zagreb | Split |
| 19:00 CET (UTC+1) | Ismajli (yellow card) 12' (yellow-red card) 40' | Report | Dilaver (yellow card) 38'; Ademi (yellow card) 40', (goal) 74'; Petković (yellow card) 45+2'; Kądzior 47' | Stadium: Stadion Poljud; Attendance: 22,436; Referee: Ivan Bebek |

| 8 March 2020 26 | Dinamo Zagreb | 2–0 | Istra 1961 | Zagreb |
| 15:00 CET (UTC+1) | Dilaver 2'; Leovac (yellow card) 11'; Stojanović (yellow card) 47'; Majer 69'; Moro (yellow card) 89' | Report | Tomašević (yellow card) 48'; Regan (yellow card) 68' | Stadium: Stadion Maksimir; Attendance: 2,474; Referee: Dario Kulušić |

| 6 June 2020 27 | Varaždin | 1–3 | Dinamo Zagreb | Varaždin |
| 21:05 CEST (UTC+2) | Drožđek (yellow card) 32'; Obregón 79' | Report | Ademi 13'; Petković 18' (pen.), (yellow card) 42'; Gvardiol (yellow card) 61'; Kulenović (yellow card) 89'; Marin 90+3' | Stadium: Stadion Varteks; Attendance: 0 Referee: Ivan Župan |

| 12 June 2020 28 | Lokomotiva | 1–0 | Dinamo Zagreb | Zagreb |
| 21:05 CEST (UTC+2) | Kolinger (yellow card) 61'; Tolić 90' (pen.) | Report | Moro (yellow card) 53' (yellow-red card) 89'; Leovac (yellow card) 74' | Stadium: Stadion Kranjčevićeva; Attendance: 0 Referee: Duje Strukan |

| 17 June 2020 29 | Dinamo Zagreb | 3–2 | Slaven Belupo | Zagreb |
| 18:55 CEST (UTC+2) | Kądzior 23'; Ivanušec 37'; Franjić (yellow card) 41'; Petković 90' | Report | Bačelić-Grgić (yellow card) 35'; Théophile-Catherine 45' (o.g.); Mateus 49'; Bogojević (yellow card) 59'; Soldo (yellow card) 62' | Stadium: Stadion Maksimir; Attendance: 1,682; Referee: Dario Kulušić |

| 20 June 2020 30 | Gorica | 0–0 | Dinamo Zagreb | Velika Gorica |
| 21:05 CEST (UTC+2) | Babec (yellow card) 4'; Lovrić (yellow card) 32'; Čabraja (yellow card) 90+2' | Report | Gvardiol (yellow card) 43'; Moubandje (yellow card) 58' | Stadium: Stadion Radnik; Attendance: 1,705; Referee: Marin Vidulin |

| 27 June 2020 31 | Dinamo Zagreb | 0–0 | Osijek | Zagreb |
| 20:00 CEST (UTC+2) | Đira (yellow card) 62'; Kulenović (yellow card) 90+3' | Report | Lyopa (yellow card) 50'; Igor Silva (yellow card) 60'; Majstorović (yellow card) 64'; Jugović (yellow card) 84' | Stadium: Stadion Maksimir; Attendance: 1,703; Referee: Ivan Bebek |

| 1 July 2020 32 | Inter Zaprešić | 0–1 | Dinamo Zagreb | Zaprešić |
| 18:55 CEST (UTC+2) | Postonjski (yellow card) 45+2' | Report | Ćuže 62' | Stadium: Stadion ŠRC Zaprešić; Attendance: 1,464; Referee: Ivan Župan |

| 5 July 2020 33 | Rijeka | 2–0 | Dinamo Zagreb | Rijeka |
| 21:05 CEST (UTC+2) | Gvardiol 2' (o.g.); Pavičić (yellow card) 10'; Čolak 52'; Čeliković (yellow card) 89' | Report | Gvardiol (yellow card) 3' | Stadium: Stadion Rujevica; Attendance: 2,687; Referee: Damir Batinić |

| 12 July 2020 34 | Dinamo Zagreb | 2–3 | Hajduk Split | Zagreb |
| 21:05 CEST (UTC+2) | Ivanušec 13'; Gojak (yellow card) 45+1' (yellow-red card) 45+4'; Oršić 61'; Dilaver (yellow card) 85' | Report | Dimitrov (yellow card) 25'; Vušković (yellow card) 28'; Čuić 31', 81'; Čolina (yellow card) 53'; Théophile-Catherine 86' (o.g.) | Stadium: Stadion Maksimir; Attendance: 1,967; Referee: Ivan Bebek |

| 18 July 2020 35 | Istra 1961 | 0–0 | Dinamo Zagreb | Pula |
| 21:05 CEST (UTC+2) | Blagojević (yellow card) 60'; R. Páez (yellow card) 60'; Galilea (yellow card) 66'; Grujević (yellow card) 76'; Bosančić (yellow card) 90+1' | Report | | Stadium: Stadion Aldo Drosina; Attendance: 0 Referee: Igor Pajač |

| 24 July 2020 36 | Dinamo Zagreb | 2–0 | Varaždin | Zagreb |
| 18:55 CEST (UTC+2) | Majer 9'; Ćuže 42' | Report | Rodin (yellow card) 71' | Stadium: Stadion Maksimir; Attendance: 0 Referee: Igor Pajač |

=== Croatian Cup ===
| 24 September 2019 First round | Karlovac 1919 | 0–7 | Dinamo Zagreb | Karlovac |
| 15:30 CEST (UTC+2) | Vinski (yellow card) 58'; Veselić (yellow card) 76'; Mićunović (yellow card) 90' | Report | Kądzior 10', 55'; Oršić 11'; Petković 43' (pen.); Šitum 45'; Leovac (yellow card) 51'; Atiemwen 82'; Gavranović 90' (pen.) | Stadium: Stadion Branko Čavlović-Čavlek; Attendance: 2,000; Referee: Igor Pajač (Sveti Ivan Zelina) |

| 30 October 2019 Second round | Opatija | 0–3 | Dinamo Zagreb | Opatija |
| 14:00 CET (UTC+1) | Bertoša (yellow card) 28' | Report | Kądzior 7'; Gavranović 28' (pen.), 35' | Stadium: Igralište Opatija; Attendance: 2,200; Referee: Zdenko Lovrić |

| 5 February 2020 Quarter-finals | Rijeka | 1–0 | Dinamo Zagreb | Rijeka |
| 17:00 CET (UTC+1) | Čolak 15', (yellow card) 90+1'; Lepinjica (yellow card) 21'; Acosty (yellow card) 84'; Escoval (yellow card) 87'; Smolčić (yellow card) 90' | Report | Leovac (yellow card) 73'; Dilaver (yellow card) 84'; Perić (yellow card) 87' | Stadium: Stadion Rujevica; Attendance: 4,257; Referee: Igor Pajač |

=== Croatian Super Cup ===
| 13 July 2019 Final | Dinamo Zagreb | 1–0 | Rijeka | Zagreb |
| 20:00 CEST (UTC+2) | Gavranović (yellow card) 25'; Gojak 41'; Majer (yellow card) 82' (yellow-red card) 85' | Report | Punčec (yellow card) 17'; Lepinjica (yellow card) 48'; Gorgon (yellow card) 75'; Raspopović (yellow card) 81'; Tomečak (yellow card) 90+2' | Stadium: Maksimir; Attendance: 5,075; Referee: Mario Zebec |

=== UEFA Champions League ===
==== Second qualifying round ====
| 23 July 2019 First leg | Saburtalo Tbilisi (Georgia (country)) | 0–2 | (Croatia) Dinamo Zagreb | Tbilisi, Georgia |
| 21:30 CEST (UTC+2) | | Report | Oršić 67'; Petković 78' (pen.) | Stadium: Mikheil Meskhi Stadium; Attendance: 15,165; Referee: Petr Ardeleanu (Czech Republic) |

| 30 July 2019 Second leg | Dinamo Zagreb (Croatia) | 3–0 (5–0 agg.) | (Georgia (country)) Saburtalo Tbilisi | Zagreb, Croatia |
| 20:00 CEST (UTC+2) | Oršić 77'; Petković 88'; Olmo 90+4' | Report | | Stadium: Stadion Maksimir; Attendance: 0 (No-crowd match); Referee: Daniele Doveri (Italy) |

==== Third qualifying round ====
| 6 August 2019 First leg | Dinamo Zagreb (Croatia) | 1–1 | (Hungary) Ferencváros | Zagreb, Croatia |
| 20:00 CEST (UTC+2) | Olmo 7' | Report | Sigér 59' | Stadium: Stadion Maksimir; Attendance: 14,283; Referee: Paweł Raczkowski (Poland) |

| 13 August 2019 Second leg | Ferencváros (Hungary) | 0–4 (1–5 agg.) | (Croatia) Dinamo Zagreb | Budapest, Hungary |
| 20:00 CEST (UTC+2) | | Report | Ademi 16'; Petković 47'; Olmo 55'; Gojak 79' | Stadium: Groupama Arena; Attendance: 20,321; Referee: Ruddy Buquet (France) |

==== Play-off round ====
| 21 August 2019 First leg | Dinamo Zagreb (Croatia) | 2–0 | (Norway) Rosenborg | Zagreb, Croatia |
| 21:00 CEST (UTC+2) | Petković 8' (pen.); Oršić 28' | Report | | Stadium: Stadion Maksimir; Attendance: 23,859; Referee: Daniele Orsato (Italy) |

| 27 August 2019 Second leg | Rosenborg (Norway) | 1–1 (1–3 agg.) | (Croatia) Dinamo Zagreb | Trondheim, Norway |
| 21:00 CEST (UTC+2) | David 11' | Report | Gojak 71' | Stadium: Lerkendal Stadion; Attendance: 18,173; Referee: Ovidiu Hațegan (Romania) |

==== Group stage ====
| Pos | Team | Pld | W | D | L | GF | GA | GD | Pts | Qualification | MCI | ATA | SHK | DZG |
|---|---|---|---|---|---|---|---|---|---|---|---|---|---|---|
| 1 | (England) Manchester City | 6 | 4 | 2 | 0 | 16 | 4 | +12 | 14 | Advance to knockout phase | — | 5–1 | 1–1 | 2–0 |
| 2 | (Italy) Atalanta | 6 | 2 | 1 | 3 | 8 | 12 | −4 | 7 | Advance to knockout phase | 1–1 | — | 1–2 | 2–0 |
| 3 | (Ukraine) Shakhtar Donetsk | 6 | 1 | 3 | 2 | 8 | 13 | −5 | 6 | Transfer to Europa League | 0–3 | 0–3 | — | 2–2 |
| 4 | (Croatia) Dinamo Zagreb | 6 | 1 | 2 | 3 | 10 | 13 | −3 | 5 | | 1–4 | 4–0 | 3–3 | — |

Source: UEFA
Rules for classification: Group stage tiebreakers

| 18 September 2019 1 | Dinamo Zagreb (Croatia) | 4–0 | (Italy) Atalanta | Zagreb, Croatia |
| 21:00 CEST (UTC+2) | Leovac 10'; Oršić 31', 42', 68'; Théophile-Catherine (yellow card) 39'; Moro (yellow card) 66' | Report | Djimsiti (yellow card) 18'; De Roon (yellow card) 27'; Gosens (yellow card) 79' | Stadium: Stadion Maksimir; Attendance: 28,863; Referee: Jesús Gil Manzano (Spain) |

| 1 October 2019 2 | Manchester City (England) | 2–0 | (Croatia) Dinamo Zagreb | Manchester, England |
| 21:00 CEST (UTC+2) | Cancelo (yellow card) 19'; Sterling 66'; Fernandinho (yellow card) 90+4'; Foden 90+5' | Report | Perić (yellow card) 69' | Stadium: City of Manchester Stadium; Attendance: 49,046; Referee: Serdar Gözübüyük (Netherlands) |

| 22 October 2019 3 | Shakhtar Donetsk (Ukraine) | 2–2 | (Croatia) Dinamo Zagreb | Kharkiv, Ukraine |
| 18:55 CEST (UTC+2) | Konoplyanka 16'; Patrick (yellow card) 40'; Pyatov (yellow card) 58'; Bolbat (yellow card) 59'; Dodô 75' | Report | Stojanović (yellow card) 7'; Perić (yellow card) 23'; Olmo 25'; Oršić 60' (pen.); Dilaver (yellow card) 63'; Ademi (yellow card) 64' | Stadium: Metalist Stadium; Attendance: 21,526; Referee: Antonio Mateu Lahoz (Spain) |

| 6 November 2019 4 | Dinamo Zagreb (Croatia) | 3–3 | (Ukraine) Shakhtar Donetsk | Zagreb, Croatia |
| 21:00 CET (UTC+1) | Petković 25'; Dilaver (yellow card) 34'; Moro (yellow card) 41' (yellow-red card) 74'; Ivanušec 83'; Ademi 89', (yellow card) 90+4'; Théophile-Catherine (yellow card) 90+7' | Report | Patrick 13'; Marlos (yellow card) 41' (yellow-red card) 79'; Moraes 90+3'; Tetê 90+7' (pen.) | Stadium: Stadion Maksimir; Attendance: 28,316; Referee: Felix Brych (Germany) |

| 26 November 2019 5 | Atalanta (Italy) | 2–0 | (Croatia) Dinamo Zagreb | Milan, Italy |
| 21:00 CET (UTC+1) | Muriel 27' (pen.); Toloi (yellow card) 42'; Gómez 47'; Pašalić (yellow card) 65' | Report | Théophile-Catherine (yellow card) 13'; Perić (yellow card) 19'; Stojanović (yellow card) 74' | Stadium: San Siro; Attendance: 28,365; Referee: Sergei Karasev (Russia) |

| 11 December 2019 6 | Dinamo Zagreb (Croatia) | 1–4 | (England) Manchester City | Zagreb, Croatia |
| 18:55 CET (UTC+1) | Olmo 10'; Ademi (yellow card) 34' | Report | Jesus 34', 50', 54'; Foden 84' | Stadium: Stadion Maksimir; Attendance: 29,385; Referee: Carlos del Cerro Grande (Spain) |

== Player seasonal records ==
=== Goals ===
| No. | Pos. | Nat. | Name | League | Europe | Cup | Supercup | Total |
|---|---|---|---|---|---|---|---|---|
| 99 | LW | (Croatia) | Mislav Oršić | 1 | 6 | – | – | 7 |
| 21 | CF | (Croatia) | Bruno Petković | 2 | 4 | – | – | 6 |
| 7 | AM | (Spain) | Dani Olmo | 1 | 3 | – | – | 4 |
| 14 | AM | (Bosnia and Herzegovina) | Amer Gojak | 1 | 2 | – | 1 | 4 |
| 20 | LW | (Nigeria) | Iyayi Atiemwen | 3 | – | – | – | 3 |
| 27 | DM | (Croatia) | Nikola Moro | 2 | – | – | – | 2 |
| 5 | DM | (North Macedonia) | Arijan Ademi | – | 1 | – | – | 1 |
| 92 | RW | (Poland) | Damian Kądzior | 1 | – | – | – | 1 |
| 11 | CF | (Switzerland) | Mario Gavranović | 1 | – | – | – | 1 |
| 22 | LB | (Croatia) | Marin Leovac | – | 1 | – | – | 1 |

=== Clean Sheets ===
| No. | Pos. | Nat. | Name | League | Europe | Cup | Supercup | Total |
|---|---|---|---|---|---|---|---|---|
| 40 | GK | (Croatia) | Dominik Livaković | 3 | 4 | – | 1 | 8 |

=== Appearances and goals ===
| Number | Position | Player | Apps | Goals | Apps | Goals | Apps | Goals | Apps | Goals | Apps | Goals |
| Number | Position | Player | Total | | 1. HNL | | Champions League | | Croatian Cup | | Supercup | |
|---|---|---|---|---|---|---|---|---|---|---|---|---|
| 1 | GK | (Croatia) Danijel Zagorac | 1 | 0 | 1+0 | 0 | 0+0 | 0 | 0+0 | 0 | 0+0 | 0 |
| 40 | GK | (Croatia) Dominik Livaković | 11 | 0 | 4+0 | 0 | 6+0 | 0 | 0+0 | 0 | 1+0 | 0 |
| 5 | MF | (North Macedonia) Arijan Ademi | 9 | 1 | 1+1 | 0 | 6+0 | 0 | 0+0 | 0 | 1+0 | 0 |
| 6 | DF | (Portugal) Ivo Pinto | 5 | 0 | 3+0 | 0 | 2+0 | 0 | 0+0 | 0 | 0+0 | 0 |
| 7 | MF | (Spain) Dani Olmo | 6 | 4 | 1+0 | 1 | 4+1 | 3 | 0+0 | 0 | 0+0 | 0 |
| 8 | MF | (Bosnia and Herzegovina) Izet Hajrović | 8 | 0 | 1+0 | 0 | 6+0 | 0 | 0+0 | 0 | 1+0 | 0 |
| 10 | MF | (Croatia) Lovro Majer | 8 | 0 | 4+0 | 0 | 0+3 | 0 | 0+0 | 0 | 0+1 | 0 |
| 11 | FW | (Switzerland) Mario Gavranović | 10 | 0 | 2+2 | 0 | 2+3 | 0 | 0+0 | 0 | 1+0 | 0 |
| 14 | MF | (Bosnia and Herzegovina) Amer Gojak | 12 | 4 | 3+2 | 1 | 3+3 | 2 | 0+0 | 0 | 1+0 | 1 |
| 16 | MF | (Croatia) Mario Šitum | 6 | 0 | 2+2 | 0 | 0+2 | 0 | 0+0 | 0 | 0+0 | 0 |
| 18 | MF | (Croatia) Antonio Marin | 4 | 0 | 2+2 | 0 | 0+0 | 0 | 0+0 | 0 | 0+0 | 0 |
| 19 | DF | (Switzerland) François Moubandje | 3 | 0 | 3+0 | 0 | 0+0 | 0 | 0+0 | 0 | 0+0 | 0 |
| 20 | MF | (Nigeria) Iyayi Atiemwen | 7 | 3 | 4+1 | 3 | 0+2 | 0 | 0+0 | 0 | 0+0 | 0 |
| 21 | FW | (Croatia) Bruno Petković | 11 | 6 | 2+2 | 2 | 4+2 | 4 | 0+0 | 0 | 0+1 | 0 |
| 22 | DF | (Croatia) Marin Leovac | 8 | 0 | 1+0 | 0 | 6+0 | 0 | 0+0 | 0 | 1+0 | 0 |
| 27 | MF | (Croatia) Nikola Moro | 9 | 2 | 3+1 | 0 | 3+1 | 0 | 0+0 | 0 | 0+1 | 0 |
| 28 | DF | (France) Kévin Théophile-Catherine | 2 | 0 | 2+0 | 0 | 0+0 | 0 | 0+0 | 0 | 0+0 | 0 |
| 30 | DF | (Slovenia) Petar Stojanović | 7 | 0 | 2+0 | 0 | 4+0 | 0 | 0+0 | 0 | 1+0 | 0 |
| 31 | DF | (Croatia) Marko Lešković | 8 | 0 | 4+0 | 0 | 3+0 | 0 | 0+0 | 0 | 1+0 | 0 |
| 34 | MF | (Croatia) Ivan Šunjić | 1 | 0 | 0+0 | 0 | 0+1 | 0 | 0+0 | 0 | 0+0 | 0 |
| 35 | FW | (Croatia) Roko Baturina | 1 | 0 | 0+1 | 0 | 0+0 | 0 | 0+0 | 0 | 0+0 | 0 |
| 55 | DF | (Croatia) Dino Perić | 10 | 0 | 2+1 | 0 | 6+0 | 0 | 0+0 | 0 | 1+0 | 0 |
| 66 | DF | (Austria) Emir Dilaver | 6 | 0 | 2+1 | 0 | 3+0 | 0 | 0+0 | 0 | 0+0 | 0 |
| 92 | MF | (Poland) Damian Kądzior | 6 | 1 | 3+0 | 1 | 2+0 | 0 | 0+0 | 0 | 1+0 | 0 |
| 99 | MF | (Croatia) Mislav Oršić | 8 | 4 | 1+0 | 1 | 6+0 | 3 | 0+0 | 0 | 1+0 | 0 |
