= 2018–19 GNK Dinamo Zagreb season =

GNK Dinamo Zagreb
2018–19 season
- Chairman: Mirko Barišić
- Manager: Nenad Bjelica
- Stadium: Maksimir
- Prva HNL: 1st
- Croatian Cup: Runners-up
- UEFA Champions League: Play-off round (eliminated by Young Boys)
- UEFA Europa League: Round of 16 (eliminated by Benfica)
- Top goalscorer: League: Bruno Petković; Mario Gavranović (9 each); All: Mislav Oršić (13 goals)
- Highest home attendance: 29,704 vs. Benfica (7 March 2019)
- Lowest home attendance: 2,687 vs Rudeš (28 July 2018)
- Average home league attendance: 6,344
- Biggest win: 5–0 vs. Hapoel Be'er Sheva (UEFA Champions League, 24 July 2018) 7–2 vs. Rudeš (Prva HNL, 2 February 2019)
- Biggest defeat: 3–0 vs. Benfica (UEFA Europa League, 14 March 2019)
Home colours	Away colours
- All statistics correct as of 1 August 2018.

The 2018–19 season is Dinamo Zagreb's 28th season in the Croatian First Division and 106th year in existence as a football club. The season covers the period from 1 July 2018 to 30 June 2019.

Dinamo will be defending their title as league champions, as well as their title as cup winners. They will also compete in the 2018–19 UEFA Champions League, entering the second qualifying round.

The club's manager is Nenad Bjelica, who will be in his first full-season with the club.

== Review ==
=== Preseason ===
On 23 June, Dinamo played their first friendly match of the pre-season, beating Macedonian side Rabotnički Skoplje, winning 4–0, with Mario Šitum (2), Dino Perić and Antonio Marin scoring the goals. Five days later, on 28 June, Dinamo played Azerbaijani side Qabala, winning 2–0, with Ivan Šunjić and Antonio Marin scoring the goals. The following players officially joined the club: Emir Dilaver (from Lech Poznań), Damian Kądzior (from Górnik Zabrze), Marin Leovac (from PAOK) and Mislav Oršić (from Uslan Hyundai), Lovro Majer (from feeder-club NK Lokomotiva) and Kévin Théophile-Catherine (from AS Saint-Étienne). The following players left the club: Borna Sosa (to Stuttgart), Ante Ćorić (to Roma) and El Arabi Hillal Soudani (to Nottingham Forrest) and the club will earn a combined €18m from their transfers. On 3 July, Dinamo trashed Austria Klagenfurt in a 6–1 win; with Armin Hodžić, Ivan Šunjić, Izet Hajrović, Filip Benković, Luka Menalo and Amer Gojak scoring one goal each. A day later, on 4 July, Dinamo beat Triglav 4–0 with Mario Šitum, Ivan Fiolić, Dani Olmo and Mario Budimir scoring the goals. Three days later, on 7 July, Dinamo beat Polish side Cracovia following Kamil Pestka's own goal in the 90th minute of the game. On 18 July, Dinamo drew 0–0 with feeder-team Sesvete. This was followed by a 2–1 away win over Varaždin in the last friendly game of the season, with goals from Armin Hodžić and Dino Perić, on 20 July.

=== July ===
On 24 July, in the first leg of the 2018–19 UEFA Champions League second qualifying phase, Dinamo beat Israeli club Hapoel Be'er Sheva by a scoreline of 5–0, despite media outlets calling Dinamo the underdogs of the match, as Hapoel had reached a historic 3–2 win over Inter Milan in the UEFA Europa League just two years prior. Dinamo won with goals coming from Izet Hajrović, Mislav Oršić, Arijan Ademi (2) and Armin Hodžić, taking a 5–0 lead into the second leg. On 28 July, in the first league match of the season, Dinamo drew 1–1 with Rudeš, initially going 0–1 down following Sadegh Moharrami's own goal, but a late equalizing goal from Dino Perić was enough to prevent defeat. In the second leg of the 2018–19 UEFA Champions second qualifying phase against Hapoel Be'er Sheva, Dinamo went 0–2 down by half-time, following a goal from John Ogu and Petar Stojanović's own goal. Dinamo eventually managed to draw the game 2–2 with goals from Mario Budimir and Izet Hajrović, confirming Dinamo's advancement into the next stage of the tournament qualifying phase.

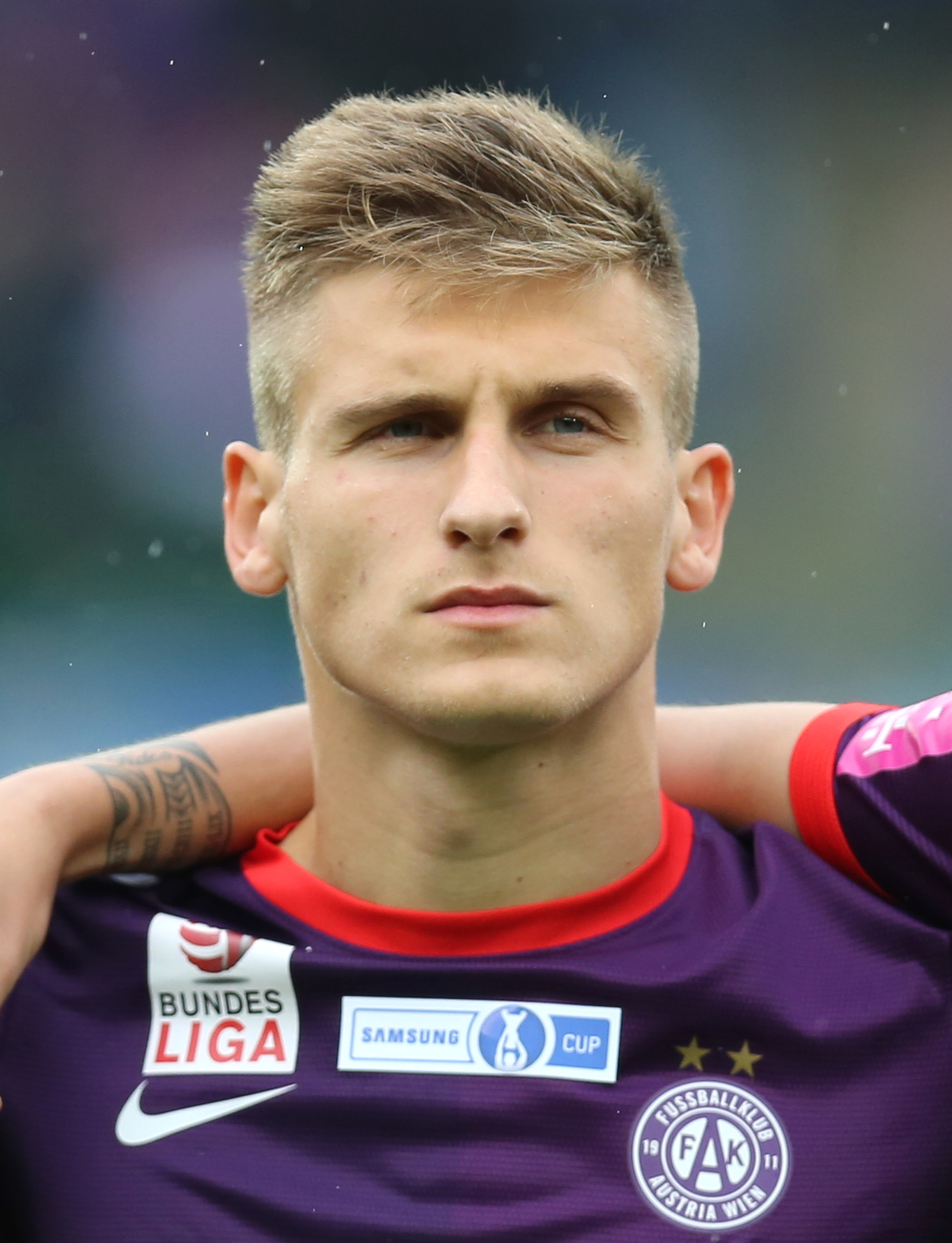
Emir Dilaver, who arrived from Lech Poznań.

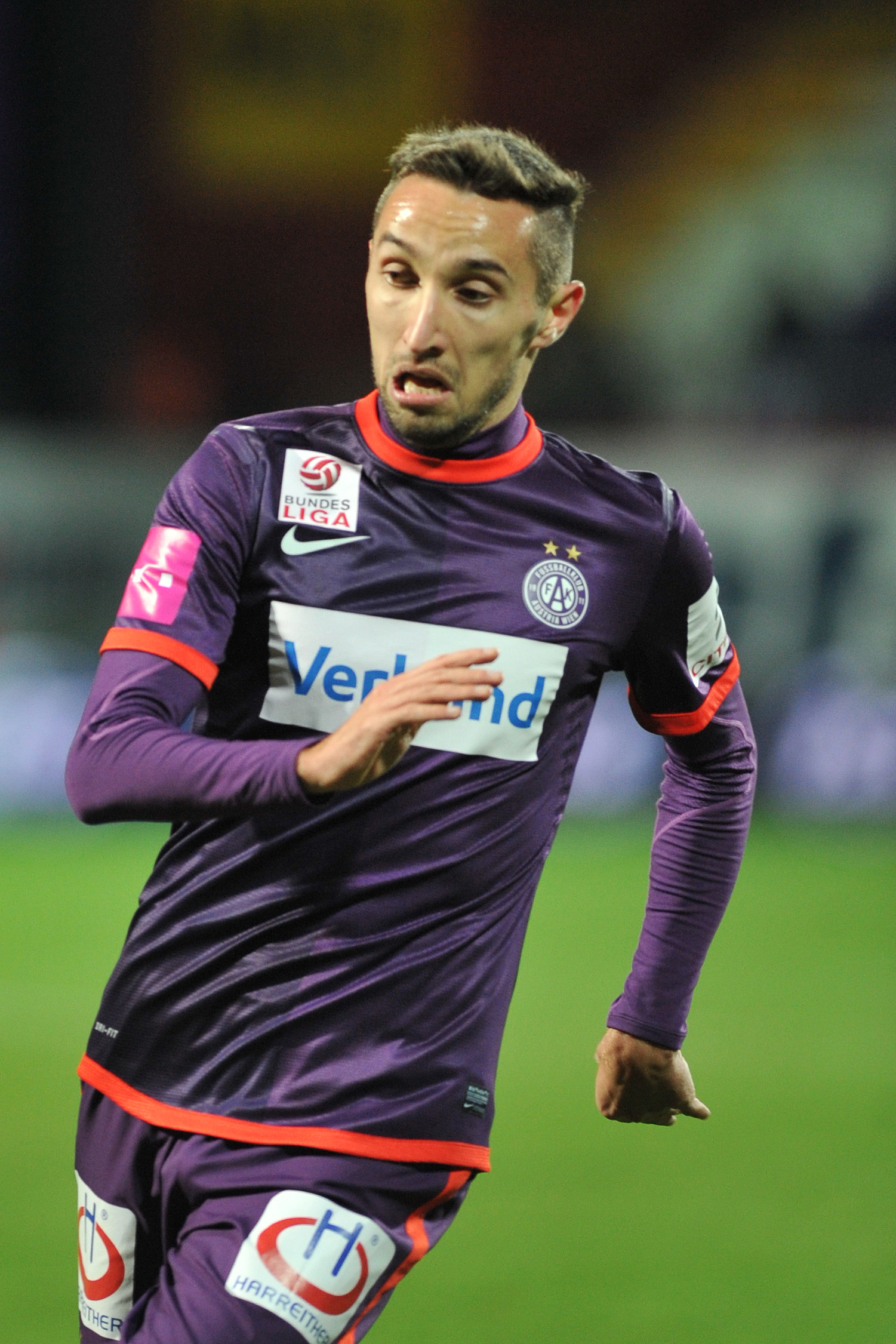
Marin Leovac, who arrived from PAOK.

=== August ===
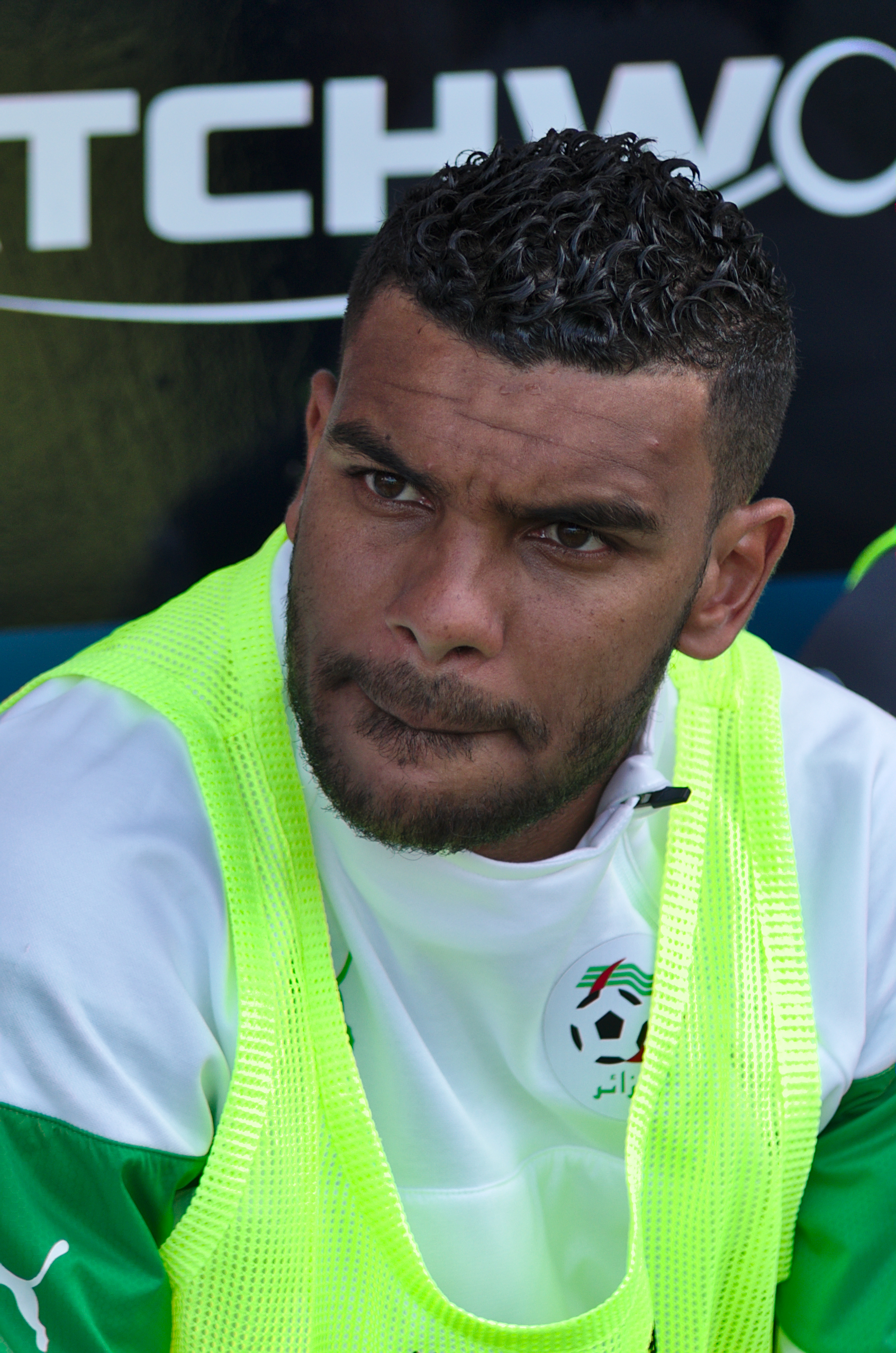
El Arabi Hillal Soudani, who spent 5 years at the club, left for Nottingham Forest.

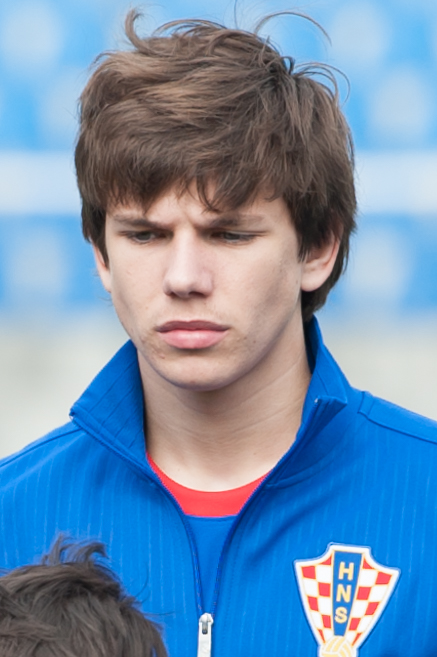
Ante Ćorić, who spent 5 years at the club, left for Roma.

On 3 August, Dinamo beat Istra 1961 by a scoreline of 3–0; with two goals from Mario Gavranović and one goal from Marin Leovac. On 7 August, Dinamo beat Kazakhstani champions Astana in the first leg of the third qualifying round of the UEFA Champions League, winning 2–0 with goals from Mario Budimir and Dani Olmo, despite being considered underdogs prior to the match. On 9 August, Dinamo Zagreb confirmed that Filip Benković signed for Premier League club Leicester City, in a fee in the region of £13m.

== Squad information ==
=== First-team squad ===
As of 8 August 2018

Note: Flags indicate national team as defined under FIFA eligibility rules; some limited exceptions apply. Players may hold more than one non-FIFA nationality.

No.	Pos.	Nation	Player
1	GK	CRO	Danijel Zagorac
2	DF	IRN	Sadegh Moharrami
3	DF	CRO	Mario Musa
5	MF	MKD	Arijan Ademi (Captain)
7	MF	ESP	Dani Olmo
8	MF	BIH	Izet Hajrović
9	FW	CRO	Mario Budimir
10	MF	CRO	Lovro Majer
11	FW	SUI	Mario Gavranović
12	GK	CRO	Dinko Horkaš
13	DF	KOS	Amir Rrahmani
14	MF	BIH	Amer Gojak
16	MF	CRO	Mario Šitum
17	MF	BIH	Luka Menalo
18	MF	CRO	Antonio Marin

No.	Pos.	Nation	Player
21	FW	CRO	Bruno Petković
22	DF	CRO	Marin Leovac
27	MF	CRO	Nikola Moro
28	DF	FRA	Kévin Théophile-Catherine
30	DF	SVN	Petar Stojanović
31	DF	CRO	Marko Lešković
34	MF	CRO	Ivan Šunjić
40	GK	CRO	Dominik Livaković
55	DF	CRO	Dino Perić
66	DF	AUT	Emir Dilaver
77	DF	ROU	Alexandru Mățel
92	MF	POL	Damian Kądzior
97	MF	CRO	Bojan Knežević
99	MF	CRO	Mislav Oršić

== Transfers ==
=== Transfers in ===
Start Date	Position	Name	Age	Type	Notes	Fee	Source
1 July 2018	CB	(Austria) Emir Dilaver	27	Transfer (from (Poland) Lech Poznań)	Permanent transfer.	€1,500,000	
1 July 2018	LW	(Croatia) Mislav Oršić	25	Transfer (from (South Korea) Ulsan Hyundai FC)	Permanent transfer.	€1,500,000	
1 July 2018	LB	(Croatia) Marin Leovac	26	Transfer (from (Greece) P.A.O.K.)	Permanent transfer.	€500,000	
1 July 2018	CM	(Poland) Damian Kądzior	26	Transfer (from (Poland) Górnik Zabrze)	Permanent transfer.	€500,000	
1 July 2018	AM	(Croatia) Lovro Majer	20	Transfer (from (Croatia) NK Lokomotiva)	Permanent transfer.	€2,500,000	
1 July 2018	CB	(France) Kévin Théophile-Catherine	28	Transfer (from (France) AS Saint-Étienne)	Permanent transfer.	Free	
	Total				€6,500,000		

=== Transfers out ===
Start Date	Position	Name	Age	Type	Notes	Fee	Source
1 July 2018	LB	(Croatia) Borna Sosa	20	Transfer (to (Germany) Stuttgart)	Permanent transfer.	€8,000,000	
1 July 2018	AM	(Croatia) Ante Ćorić	21	Transfer (to (Italy) Roma)	Permanent transfer.	€6,000,000	
1 July 2018	RW	(Algeria) El Arabi Hillal Soudani	30	Transfer (to (England) Nottingham Forrest)	Permanent transfer.	€2,300,000	
9 August 2018	CB	(Croatia) Filip Benković	21	Transfer (to (England) Leicester City)	Permanent transfer.	€14,000,000	
	Total				€30,300,000		

=== Loans out ===
Start Date	Position	Name	Age	Type	Notes	Fee	Source
9 August 2018	GK	(Croatia) Adrian Šemper	20	Transfer (to (Italy) Chievo)	One-year deal.	N/A	
	Total				N/A		

== Friendlies ==
=== Preseason ===
23 June 2018 Friendly	Dinamo Zagreb (Croatia)	4–0	(North Macedonia) Rabotnički	Zagreb, Croatia
18:00 CEST	Šitum 15', 28'; Perić 43'; Antonio Marin 48'	Report		Stadium: Maksimir

28 June 2018 Friendly	Dinamo Zagreb (Croatia)	2–0	(Azerbaijan) Gabala	Murska Sobota, Slovenia
18:00 CEST	Šunjić 64'; Antonio Marin 86'	Report		Stadium: Fazanerija

3 July 2018 Friendly	Dinamo Zagreb (Croatia)	6–1	(Austria) Klagenfurt	Murska Sobota, Slovenija
18:30 CEST	Hodžić 59'; Šunjić 71'; Hajrović 76'; Benković 83'; Menalo 86'; Gojak 89'	Report	Zakany 22'	Stadium: Fazanerija

4 July 2018 Friendly	Dinamo Zagreb (Croatia)	4–0	(Slovenia) Triglav	Murska Sobota, Slovenia
18:00 CEST	Šitum 7'; Fiolić 28'; Olmo 46'; Budimir 51'	Report		Stadium: Fazanerija

7 July 2018 Friendly	Dinamo Zagreb (Croatia)	1–0	(Poland) Cracovia	Murska Sobota, Slovenia
11:00 CEST	Pestka 90' (o.g.)	Report		Stadium: Fazanerija

18 July 2018 Friendly	Dinamo Zagreb (Croatia)	0–0	(Croatia) Sesvete	Zagreb, Croatia
18:00 CEST		Report		Stadium: Maksimir; Referee: Matej Horvat

20 July 2018 Friendly	Varaždin (Croatia)	1–2	(Croatia) Dinamo Zagreb	Varaždin, Croatia
19:30 CEST	Jertec 39'	Report	Hodžić 12'; Perić 51'	Stadium: Gradski stadion Varaždin; Referee: Ivan Slunjski

== Competitions ==
=== Overall ===
Competition	Started round	Current position / round	Final position / round	First match	Last match
Prva HNL	—	—		28 July 2018	25 May 2019
Croatian Cup	First round	—		TBD	
UEFA Champions League	Second qualifying round	Third qualifying round		24–25 July 2018	

Updated to match played August 2018
Source: Competitions

=== Overview ===
Competition	Record							
Competition	G	W	D	L	GF	GA	GD	Win %
Prva HNL	36	29	5	2	74	20	+54	80.56
Croatian Cup	5	4	0	1	9	3	+6	80.00
UEFA Champions League	6	3	2	1	12	5	+7	50.00
UEFA Europa League	10	6	2	2	16	8	+8	60.00
Total	57	42	9	6	111	36	+75	73.68

Updated to match played 26 May 2019
Source: Competitions

=== Prva HNL ===
==== Table ====
Pos	Team	Pld	W	D	L	GF	GA	GD	Pts	Qualification or relegation
1	Dinamo Zagreb (C)	36	29	5	2	74	20	+54	92	Qualification for the Champions League second qualifying round
2	Rijeka	36	19	10	7	70	36	+34	67	Qualification for the Europa League third qualifying round (Note: Rijeka qualified for the Europa League third qualifying round by winning the 2018–19 Croatian Football Cup. As a result, the spot awarded to the runners-up (Europa League second qualifying round) was passed to the third-placed team, and the spot awarded to the third-placed team (Europa League first qualifying round) was passed to the fourth-placed team.)
3	Osijek	36	18	8	10	61	36	+25	62 (Note: Head-to-head points: Osijek 7 pts, Hajduk Split 4 pts.)	Qualification for the Europa League second qualifying round
4	Hajduk Split	36	17	11	8	59	39	+20	62	Qualification for the Europa League first qualifying round
5	Gorica	36	17	8	11	57	46	+11	59	

Source: PrvaHNL.hr
Rules for classification: 1) Points; 2) Head-to-head points; 3) Head-to-head goal difference; 4) Head-to-head goals scored (at home if two teams tied); 5) Goal difference; 6) Goals scored; 7) Play-off
(Note: Criteria 2-4 and 7 is only used if deciding champion, teams to international competition or teams for relegation and in that case criteria 6 will not be used).
(C) Champions

==== Summary ====
Overall								Home						Away					
Pld	W	D	L	GF	GA	GD	Pts	W	D	L	GF	GA	GD	W	D	L	GF	GA	GD
36	29	5	2	74	20	+54	92	16	2	0	43	11	+32	13	3	2	31	9	+22

Last updated: 26 May 2019.

==== By matchday ====
Matchday	1	2	3	4	5	6	7	8	9	10	11	12	13	14	15	16	17	18	19	20	21	22	23	24	25	26	27	28	29	30	31	32	33	34	35	36
Ground	H	H	H	H	H	H	A	H	A	A	A	A	A	A	A	H	A	H	H	H	H	H	A	H	A	H	A	A	A	A	A	H	A	H	A	H
Result	D	W	W	W	W	D	W	W	D	W	W	W	W	W	L	W	W	W	W	W	W	W	D	W	W	W	W	W	W	W	L	W	D	W	W	W
Position	4	4	4	1	1	1	1	1	1	1	1	1	1	1	1	1	1	1	1	1	1	1	1	1	1	1	1	1	1	1	1	1	1	1	1	1

Updated to match(es) played on 26 May 2019. Source: Results
A = Away; H = Home; W = Win; D = Draw; L = Loss

==== Matches ====
Win Draw Loss

28 July 2018 1	Dinamo Zagreb	1–1	Rudeš	Zagreb
20:00 CEST	Perić 90+3'	Report	Moharrami 28' (o.g.)	Stadium: Maksimir; Attendance: 2,687; Referee: Igor Pajač

3 August 2018 2	Dinamo Zagreb	3–0	Istra 1961	Zagreb
21:00 CEST	Gavranović 12', 47'; Leovac 45+1'; Šunjić (yellow card) 57'	Report	J. Rodríguez (yellow card) 38'; Grujević (yellow card) 42'	Stadium: Maksimir; Attendance: 2,710; Referee: Goran Gabrilo

10 August 2018 3	Dinamo Zagreb	2–1	Slaven Belupo	Zagreb
20:00 CEST	Hodžić 19'; Lešković 42'	Report	Bogojević 90'	Stadium: Maksimir; Attendance: 2,413; Referee: Igor Križarić

17 August 2018 4	Dinamo Zagreb	2–1	Osijek	Zagreb
20:00 CEST	Théophile-Catherine 22'; Leovac (yellow card) 76'; Oršić 86'	Report	Boban (yellow card) 47'; Marić (yellow card) 70'; Petković 90' (o.g.); Škorić (yellow card) 90'; Lopa (yellow card) 90+3'	Stadium: Maksimir; Attendance: 5,012; Referee: Ivan Bebek

25 August 2018 5	Dinamo Zagreb	1–0	Lokomotiva	Zagreb
21:00 CEST	Petković 48' (pen.); Šunjić (yellow card) 72'	Report	Kolinger (yellow card) 8'; Karačić (yellow card) 48'; Đurasek (yellow card) 65'; Krstanović (yellow card) 72'; Datković (yellow card) 80'; Ivanušec (yellow card) 88'	Stadium: Maksimir; Attendance: 2,468; Referee: Dalibor Mlakar

2 September 2018 6	Dinamo Zagreb	1–1	Rijeka	Zagreb
21:00 CEST	Gavranović 32'	Report	Raspopović (yellow card) 11' (yellow-red card) 90', (goal) 38'	Stadium: Maksimir; Attendance: 5,752; Referee: Duje Strukan

15 September 2018 7	Gorica	0–1	Dinamo Zagreb	Velika Gorica
16:30 CEST	Mchedlishvili (yellow card) 11'; Čagalj (yellow card) 31'; Marina (yellow card) 43'; Zwoliński (yellow card) 69'	Report	Carvajal 49'; Stojanović (yellow card) 59' (yellow-red card) 65'; Gojak (yellow card) 90+3'	Stadium: Stadion Radnik; Attendance: 4,029; Referee: Mario Zebec

23 September 2018 8	Dinamo Zagreb	5–3	Inter Zaprešić	Zagreb
16:30 CEST	Lešković 14'; Budimir 58' (pen.); Oršić (yellow card) 68'; Petković 71', 83'; Kadzior 90+4'	Report	Valentić (yellow card) 40'; Ajayi 53'; Andrić 55'; Haramustek (red card) 57'; Mamut (yellow card) 59'; Šunjić 69' (o.g.)	Stadium: Maksimir; Attendance: 2,507; Referee: Tihomir Pejin

29 September 2018 9	Hajduk	0–0	Dinamo Zagreb	Split
16:30 CEST	Ivanovski (yellow card) 55'; Palaversa (yellow card) 76'; Hamza (yellow card) 90+5'	Report	Théophile-Catherine (yellow card) 74'	Stadium: Stadion Poljud; Attendance: 21,472; Referee: Ivan Bebek

7 October 2018 10	Rudeš	0–3	Dinamo Zagreb	Rudeš, Zagreb
16:30 CEST	Mrkonjić (yellow card) 10'; Kalik (yellow card) 44'; Oluić (yellow card) 76'	Report	Budimir 23', 28'; Rrahmani (yellow card) 57', (goal) 74'	Stadium: Stadion Kranjčevićeva; Attendance: 1,027; Referee: Ivan Vučković

20 October 2018 11	Istra 1961	1–4	Dinamo Zagreb	Pula, Istria
17:30 CEST	Fuentes 7'; Cardozo (yellow card) 20'; Traoré (yellow card) 28'; Rodríguez (yellow card) 45+1'; Regan (yellow card) 51'; Sane (yellow card) 64'	Report	Petković 8', (yellow card) 24'; Budimir (yellow card) 27', (goal) 90+3'; Šunjić (yellow card) 34'; Rrahmani (yellow card) 62'; Gavranović 65'; Ademi 66'; Stojanović (yellow card) 74'	Stadium: Stadion Aldo Drosina; Attendance: 2,200; Referee: Tihomir Pejin

28 October 2018 12	Slaven Belupo	0–2	Dinamo Zagreb	Koprivnica
17:30 CET	Gordana (yellow card) 11'; Bogojević (yellow card) 70'; Puclin (yellow card) 75'	Report	Budimir 70'; Carvajal (yellow card) 75'; Kadzior 88'	Stadium: Gradski stadion Attendance: 1,893; Referee: Ivan Bebek

4 November 2018 13	Osijek	0–2	Dinamo Zagreb	Osijek
17:30 CET	Tomelin (yellow card) 40'; Pušić (yellow card) 53'; Lončar (yellow card) 54'	Report	Stojanović (yellow card) 4'; Perić (yellow card) 12'; Gavranović 64'; Gojak (yellow card) 75'; Carvajal (yellow card) 86' (goal) 90+4'	Stadium: Stadion Gradski vrt Attendance: 8,127; Referee: Mario Zebec

11 November 2018 14	Lokomotiva	0–1	Dinamo Zagreb	Zagreb
17:30 CET	Kolinger (yellow card) 19'; Radonjić (yellow card) 51'; Majstorović (yellow card) 90+1'	Report	Petković 16'; Šunjić (yellow card) 50'; Ademi (yellow card) 57'	Stadium: Stadion Kranjčevićeva; Attendance: 3,240; Referee: Igor Pajač

24 November 2018 15	Rijeka	1–0	Dinamo Zagreb	Rijeka
15:00 CET	Zuta (yellow card) 36'; Čolak 64'; Acosty (yellow card) 90+1'	Report	Hajrović (yellow card) 29'; Dilaver (yellow card) 45'; Leovac (yellow card) 89'; Stojanović (yellow card) 90+1'	Stadium: Rujevica; Attendance: 4,635; Referee: Tihomir Pejin

2 December 2018 16	Dinamo Zagreb	1–0	Gorica	Zagreb
15:00 CET	Perić (yellow card) 49'; Šitum 55'	Report	Marina (yellow card) 65'; Oboabona (yellow card) 75'	Stadium: Maksimir; Attendance: 2,477; Referee: Ivan Bebek

9 December 2018 17	Inter Zaprešić	0–2	Dinamo Zagreb	Zaprešić
15:00 CET	Čeliković (yellow card) 37' (yellow-red card) 50'; Šimunec (yellow card) 90+1'	Report	Kadzior 22'; Rrahmani (yellow card) 38'; Petković 60', (yellow card) 79'; Lešković (yellow card) 67'; Moro (yellow card) 77'	Stadium: ŠRC Zaprešić; Attendance: 1,665; Referee: Damir Batinić

16 December 2018 18	Dinamo Zagreb	1–0	Hajduk	Zagreb
15:00 CET	Musa (yellow card) 22'; Kadzior 49', (yellow card) 49'; Carvajal (yellow card) 54'	Report	Tudor (yellow card) 9'; Nejašmić (yellow card) 43'	Stadium: Maksimir; Attendance: 11,064; Referee: Ivan Bebek

2 February 2019 19	Dinamo Zagreb	7–2	Rudeš	Zagreb
15:00 CET	Hajrović 5', 9'; Petković 19'; Gojak 40'; Perić (yellow card) 55'; Oršić 56', 60', 65'	Report	Štrkalj 23', 79'; Vuco (yellow card) 84'; Barić (yellow card) 84'	Stadium: Maksimir; Attendance: 2,237; Referee: Fran Jović

9 February 2019 20	Dinamo Zagreb	1–0	Istra 1961	Zagreb
17:30 CET	Leovac (yellow card) 33'; Petković 86' (pen.); Majer (yellow card) 88'	Report	Sávio (yellow card) 3'; Gomes (yellow card) 64'; Perić-Komšić (yellow card) 69'; López (yellow card) 75'	Stadium: Maksimir; Attendance: 2,284; Referee: Igor Pajač

17 February 2019 21	Dinamo Zagreb	3–0	Slaven Belupo	Zagreb
17:30 CET	Hajrović 67'; Oršić 77'; Musa 88'	Report	Goda (yellow card) 18'; Šarlija (yellow card) 40'	Stadium: Maksimir; Attendance: 2,383; Referee: Andrej Burilo

24 February 2019 22	Dinamo Zagreb	3–0	Osijek	Zagreb
17:30 CET	Andrić 8'; Atiemwen 21'; Rrahmani 60'	Report	Grgić (yellow card) 19'	Stadium: Maksimir; Attendance: 4,304; Referee: Mario Zebec

2 March 2019 23	Lokomotiva	1–1	Dinamo Zagreb	Zagreb
17:30 CET	Jakić (yellow card) 30'; Uzuni 80'	Report	Moro (yellow card) 25'; Leovac (yellow card) 45+1'; Majer (yellow card) 48'; Olmo 72'	Stadium: Stadion Kranjčevićeva; Attendance: 2,820; Referee: Damir Batinić

10 March 2019 24	Dinamo Zagreb	3–1	Rijeka	Zagreb
17:30 CET	Lešković (yellow card) 37'; Gavranović 42'; Perić 57'; Moro 69'	Report	Puljić 6'; Bušnja (yellow card) 8'; Pavičić (yellow card) 21'; Gorgon (yellow card) 44'; Mamić (yellow card) 45'; Kvržić (yellow card) 65'	Stadium: Maksimir; Attendance: 6,186; Referee: Marko Matoc

17 March 2019 25	Gorica	1–2	Dinamo Zagreb	Velika Gorica
15:00 CET	Marina (yellow card) 24'; Lovrić 57' (pen.); Miya (yellow card) 60'; Čagalj (yellow card) 61'	Report	Andrić 25' (pen.), 61' (pen.); Leovac (yellow card) 57'; Šunjić (yellow card) 64'; Perić (yellow card) 67'; Gojak (yellow card) 85'; Majer (yellow card) 86'	Stadium: Stadion Radnik; Attendance: 4,257; Referee: Duje Strukan

30 March 2019 26	Dinamo Zagreb	1–0	Inter Zaprešić	Zagreb
16:30 CET	Moro 16'	Report	Čeliković (yellow card) 28'	Stadium: Maksimir; Attendance: 3,612; Referee: Ivan Bebek

3 April 2019 27	Hajduk	0–1	Dinamo Zagreb	Split
19:00 CEST	Bradarić (yellow card) 16'; Caktaš (red card) 77'; Ismajli (yellow card) 85'; B. López (yellow card) 87'	Report	Théophile-Catherine (yellow card) 5'; Gavranović 26'; Šunjić (yellow card) 77'; Olmo (yellow card) 80'; Gojak (yellow card) 88'; Livaković (yellow card) 90+2'	Stadium: Stadion Poljud; Attendance: 26,664; Referee: Damir Batinić

7 April 2019 28	Rudeš	0–2	Dinamo Zagreb	Rudeš, Zagreb
16:30 CEST		Report	Majer 46'; Olmo 76'	Stadium: Stadion Kranjčevićeva; Attendance: 525; Referee: Goran Gabrilo

13 April 2019 29	Istra 1961	0–4	Dinamo Zagreb	Pula, Istria
16:30 CEST		Report	Ademi 20', (yellow card) 58'; Atiemwen (yellow card) 42'; Oršić 44'; Šunjić (yellow card) 45'; Théophile-Catherine (yellow card) 55'; Olmo 65', 73'; Rrahmani (yellow card) 76'	Stadium: Stadion Aldo Drosina; Attendance: 2,141; Referee: Dario Bel

19 April 2019 30	Slaven Belupo	0–1	Dinamo Zagreb	Koprivnica
19:00 CEST	Jajalo (yellow card) 30'; Međimorec (yellow card) 33'; Vidović (yellow card) 50'; Dolček (yellow card) 65'; Čanađija (yellow card) 71'; Menalo (yellow card) 90'	Report	Moro (yellow card) 16'; Gojak (yellow card) 40', (goal) 48'; Petković (yellow card) 75'	Stadium: Gradski stadion Attendance: 1,882; Referee: Damir Batinić

27 April 2019 31	Osijek	2–1	Dinamo Zagreb	Osijek
19:00 CEST	Oliveira 36', (yellow card) 90'; Guti (yellow card) 49'; Škorić (yellow card) 53'; Marić 76' (pen.); Pilj (yellow card) 86'	Report	Šitum 20'; Musa (yellow card) 23'; Šunjić (yellow card) 28'; Perić (yellow card) 55' (yellow-red card) 66'; Atiemwen (yellow card) 87'	Stadium: Stadion Gradski vrt Attendance: 3,310; Referee: Igor Pajač

5 May 2019 32	Dinamo Zagreb	3–0	Lokomotiva	Zagreb
19:00 CEST	Rrahmani 57'; Olmo 64'; Petković (yellow card) 77', (goal) 90+2' (pen.)	Report		Stadium: Maksimir; Attendance: 1,087; Referee: Ivan Bebek

11 May 2019 33	Rijeka	0–0	Dinamo Zagreb	Rijeka
19:00 CEST	Lepinjica (yellow card) 53'; Kvržić (yellow card) 72'	Report	Rrahmani (yellow card) 38'; Gojak (yellow card) 66'; Lešković (yellow card) 80'	Stadium: Rujevica; Attendance: 5,543; Referee: Mario Zebec

15 May 2019 34	Dinamo Zagreb	3–1	Gorica	Zagreb
18:00 CEST	Moro 17'; Olmo 21'; Leovac 71'	Report	Ndiaye 25'; Maloča (yellow card) 54'; Lovrić (yellow card) 76'	Stadium: Maksimir; Attendance: 610; Referee: Goran Gabrilo

18 May 2019 35	Inter Zaprešić	2–3	Dinamo Zagreb	Zaprešić
16:30 CEST	Ajayi 32'; Tsonev 35'; Bosec (yellow card) 90+2'	Report	Kądzior 5', 17'; Andrić 61' (pen.)	Stadium: ŠRC Zaprešić; Attendance: 1,688; Referee: Igor Križarić

26 May 2019 36	Dinamo Zagreb	3–1	Hajduk	Zagreb
19:00 CEST	Hajrović 20'; Gavranović 49', 57'; Stojanović (yellow card) 68'; Théophile-Catherine (yellow card) 70'; Šunjić (yellow card) 86'	Report	Barry (yellow card) 16'; Svatok (yellow card) 44'; Caktaš 68'	Stadium: Maksimir; Attendance: 15,433; Referee: Ivan Bebek

=== Croatian Cup ===
Win Draw Loss

26 September 2018 1st round	Sloga Mravince	0–1	Dinamo Zagreb	Mravince
15:30 CEST	Borozan (yellow card) 37'; Andabak (yellow card) 48'; Boko (yellow card) 72'; Juričić (yellow card) 79'	Report	Zagorac (yellow card) 65'; Lešković (yellow card) 73'; Budimir 79' (pen.); Musa (yellow card) 82'	Stadium: Stadion Glavica; Attendance: 1,300; Referee: Dario Kulušić

31 October 2018 2nd round	Zelina	0–4	Dinamo Zagreb	Sveti Ivan Zelina
15:30 CET	Pajač (yellow card) 23'; Saez (yellow card) 43'; Skupnjak (yellow card) 86'	Report	Gavranović 45'; Hajrović (yellow card) 54'; Gojak (yellow card) 66'; Petković 81'; Kadzior 87', 89'	Stadium: Gradski stadion Zelina; Attendance: 1,600; Referee: Zdenko Lovrić

5 December 2018 Quarter-finals	Dinamo Zagreb	1–0	Slaven Belupo	Zagreb
19:30 CET	Oršić 22'	Report	Doležal (yellow card) 42'; Puclin (yellow card) 74'	Stadium: Maksimir; Attendance: 1,687; Referee: Tihomir Pejin

23 April 2019 Semi-finals	Dinamo Zagreb	2–0	Osijek	Zagreb
18:00 CEST	Olmo 18'; Šunjić (yellow card) 30' (goal) 90'; Ademi (yellow card) 63'; Rrahmani (yellow card) 70'; Hajrović (yellow card) 72'	Report	Škorić (yellow card) 75'; Guti (yellow card) 79'	Stadium: Maksimir; Attendance: 3,483; Referee: Ivan Bebek

22 May 2019 Final	Dinamo Zagreb	1–3	Rijeka	Pula
18:00 CEST	Théophile-Catherine (yellow card) 53'; Oršić 64'; Gavranović (yellow card) 86'	Report	Čolak 13' (yellow card) 27'; Capan (yellow card) 23'; Halilović 39'; Kvržić 85'	Stadium: Stadion Aldo Drosina; Attendance: 6,742; Referee: Damir Batinić

=== UEFA Champions League ===
Win Draw Loss

==== Second qualifying round ====
24 July 2018 First leg	Dinamo Zagreb (Croatia)	5–0	(Israel) Hapoel Be'er Sheva	Zagreb
20:00 CEST	Hajrović 22'; Oršić 28'; Ademi 51', 62'; Hodžić 82'	Report		Stadium: Maksimir; Attendance: 10,000; Referee: (Turkey) Ali Palabıyık

31 July 2018 Second leg	Hapoel Be'er Sheva (Israel)	2–2 (2–7 agg.)	(Croatia) Dinamo Zagreb	Be'er Sheva
20:00 IST	Ogu 14'; Stojanović 34' (o.g.)	Report	Budimir 49'; Hajrović 54'	Stadium: Turner; Attendance: 9,000; Referee: (France) François Letexier

==== Third qualifying round ====
7 August 2018 First leg	Astana (Kazakhstan)	0–2	(Croatia) Dinamo Zagreb	Astana
20:00 ALMT		Report	Budimir 39'; Olmo 84'	Stadium: Astana Arena; Referee: (Scotland) John Beaton

14 August 2018 Second leg	Dinamo Zagreb (Croatia)	1–0 (3–0 agg.)	(Kazakhstan) Astana	Zagreb
20:00 CEST	Gavranović 74'	Report		Stadium: Maksimir; Referee: (Lithuania) Gediminas Mažeika

==== Play-off round ====
22 August 2018 First leg	Young Boys (Switzerland)	1–1	(Croatia) Dinamo Zagreb	Bern
21:00 CEST	Mbabu 2'	Report	Oršić 40'	Stadium: Wankdorf; Referee: (Spain) Undiano Mallenco

28 August 2018 Second leg	Dinamo Zagreb (Croatia)	1–2 (2–3 agg.)	(Switzerland) Young Boys	Stadion Maksimir, Zagreb
21:00	Hajrović 7'	Report	Hoarau 64' (pen.), 66'	Attendance: 28,137; Referee: Björn Kuipers (Netherlands)

=== Group D ===
Pos	Team	Pld	W	D	L	GF	GA	GD	Pts	Qualification	DZG	FEN	SPT	AND
1	(Croatia) Dinamo Zagreb	6	4	2	0	11	3	+8	14	Advance to knockout phase	—	4–1	3–1	0–0
2	(Turkey) Fenerbahçe	6	2	2	2	7	7	0	8	Advance to knockout phase	0–0	—	2–0	2–0
3	(Slovakia) Spartak Trnava	6	2	1	3	4	7	−3	7		1–2	1–0	—	1–0
4	(Belgium) Anderlecht	6	0	3	3	2	7	−5	3		0–2	2–2	0–0	—

Source: UEFA
Rules for classification: Group stage tiebreakers

20 September 2018 1	Dinamo Zagreb (Croatia)	4–1	(Turkey) Fenerbahçe	Zagreb, Croatia
21:00	Šunjić 16'; Hajrović 27', 57'; Olmo 60'	Report	Neustädter 47'	Stadium: Stadion Maksimir; Attendance: 17,303; Referee: Craig Pawson (England)

4 October 2018 2	Anderlecht (Belgium)	0–2	(Croatia) Dinamo Zagreb	Anderlecht, Brussels, Belgium
18:55		Report	Hajrović 19' (pen.); Gojak 68'	Stadium: Constant Vanden Stock Stadium; Attendance: 12,137; Referee: Vladislav Bezborodov (Russia)

25 October 2018 3	Spartak Trnava (Slovakia)	1–2	(Croatia) Dinamo Zagreb	Trnava, Slovakia
18:55	Ghorbani 32'	Report	Gavranović 64'; Oršić 77'	Stadium: Štadión Antona Malatinského; Attendance: 0 Referee: Jakob Kehlet (Denmark)

8 November 2018 4	Dinamo Zagreb (Croatia)	3–1	(Slovakia) Spartak Trnava	Zagreb, Croatia
21:00	Gojak 22'; Kadlec 36' (o.g.); Oršić 79'	Report	Chanturishvili 63'	Stadium: Stadion Maksimir, Zagreb; Attendance: 18,154; Referee: Serhiy Boyko (Ukraine)

29 November 2018 5	Fenerbahçe (Turkey)	0–0	(Croatia) Dinamo Zagreb	Istanbul, Turkey
18:55		Report		Stadium: Şükrü Saracoğlu Stadium; Attendance: 24,776; Referee: Robert Schörgenhofer (Austria)

13 December 2018 6	Dinamo Zagreb (Croatia)	0–0	(Belgium) Anderlecht	Zagreb, Croatia
21:00		Report		Stadium: Stadion Maksimir; Attendance: 12,170; Referee: Sandro Schärer (Switzerland)

==== Knockout phase ====
===== Round of 32 =====
14 February 2019 First leg	Viktoria Plzeň (Czech Republic)	2–1	(Croatia) Dinamo Zagreb	Plzeň, Czech Republic
21:00 CET	Pernica 54', 83'	Report	Olmo 41'	Stadium: Doosan Arena; Attendance: 9,731; Referee: Serdar Gözübüyük (Netherlands)

21 February 2019 Second leg	Dinamo Zagreb (Croatia)	3–0 (4–2 agg.)	(Czech Republic) Viktoria Plzeň	Zagreb, Croatia
18:55 CET	Oršić 15'; Dilaver 34'; Petković 73'	Report		Stadium: Stadion Maksimir; Attendance: 25,860; Referee: István Kovács (Romania)

===== Round of 16 =====
7 March 2019 First leg	Dinamo Zagreb (Croatia)	1–0	(Portugal) Benfica	Zagreb, Croatia
18:55 CET	Petković 38' (pen.)	Report		Stadium: Stadion Maksimir; Attendance: 29,704; Referee: Michael Oliver (England)

14 March 2019 Second leg	Benfica (Portugal)	3–0 (a.e.t.) (3–1 agg.)	(Croatia) Dinamo Zagreb	Lisbon, Portugal
21:00 CET	Jonas 71'; Ferro 94'; Grimaldo 105'	Report		Stadium: Estádio da Luz; Attendance: 47,808; Referee: Deniz Aytekin (Germany)

== Statistics ==
=== Goalscorers ===
No.	Pos.	Nat.	Name	League	Cup	Europe	Total
99	LW	(Croatia)	Mislav Oršić	6	2	5	13
21	CF	(Croatia)	Bruno Petković	9	1	2	12
7	AM	(Spain)	Dani Olmo	8	1	3	12
11	CF	(Switzerland)	Mario Gavranović	9	1	2	12
8	RW	(Bosnia and Herzegovina)	Izet Hajrović	4	0	6	10
9	ST	(Croatia)	Mario Budimir	5	1	2	8
92	RW	(Poland)	Damian Kadzior	6	2	0	8
5	DM	(North Macedonia)	Arijan Ademi	2	0	2	4
14	AM	(Bosnia and Herzegovina)	Amer Gojak	2	0	2	4
9	CF	(Serbia)	Komnen Andrić	4	0	0	4
13	CB	(Kosovo)	Amir Rrahmani	3	0	0	3
27	DM	(Croatia)	Nikola Moro	3	0	0	3
31	CB	(Croatia)	Marko Lešković	2	0	0	2
15	CF	(Bosnia and Herzegovina)	Armin Hodžić	1	0	1	2
55	CB	(Croatia)	Dino Perić	2	0	0	2
34	DM	(Croatia)	Ivan Šunjić	0	1	1	2
16	LW	(Croatia)	Mario Šitum	2	0	0	2
22	LB	(Croatia)	Marin Leovac	2	0	0	2
28	CB	(France)	Kévin Théophile-Catherine	1	0	0	1
3	LB	(Croatia)	Mario Musa	1	0	0	1
66	CB	(Austria)	Emir Dilaver	0	0	1	1
20	LW	(Nigeria)	Iyayi Atiemwen	1	0	0	1
10	AM	(Croatia)	Lovro Majer	1	0	0	1

=== Clean sheets ===
No.	Pos.	Nat.	Name	League	Cup	Europe	Total
1	GK	(Croatia)	Danijel Zagorac	1	0	2	3

=== Disciplinary record ===
No.	Pos.	Name	League		Cup		Europe		Total	
No.	Pos.	Name	Booked	Sent off (straight red)	Booked	Sent off (straight red)	Booked	Sent off (straight red)	Booked	Sent off (straight red)
15	CF	(Bosnia and Herzegovina) Armin Hodžić	1	0	0	0	0	0	1	0
19	AM	(Croatia) Ivan Fiolić	1	0	0	0	0	0	1	0
31	CB	(Croatia) Marko Lešković	1	0	0	0	0	0	1	0
34	CM	(Croatia) Ivan Šunjić	1	0	0	0	0	0	1	0
8	RW	(Bosnia and Herzegovina) Izet Hajrović	0	0	0	0	2	0	2	0
14	AM	(Bosnia and Herzegovina) Amer Gojak	0	0	0	0	2	0	2	0
30	RB	(Slovenia) Petar Stojanović	0	0	0	0	2	0	2	0
5	DM	(North Macedonia) Arijan Ademi	0	0	0	0	1	0	1	0
22	LB	(Croatia) Marin Leovac	0	0	0	0	1	0	1	0
Total			4	0	0	0	8	0	12	0

== Sponsorship ==
- Lana Group (front shirt sponsors)
- Ban Tours
- Coca-Cola
- Euroherc
- VIP
- Hrvatski Telekom
- Mlinar
- Ožujsko
- Cammeo
- Franck
- adidas (kit manufacturers)
