= Marko Đira =

Croatian footballer

Personal information
- Date of birth: 5 May 1999 (age 27)
- Place of birth: Šibenik, Croatia
- Height: 1.71 m (5 ft 7 in)
- Position: Midfielder

Team information
- Current team: Cibalia

Youth career
- –2015: Šibenik
- 2015–2019: Dinamo Zagreb

Senior career*
Years	Team	Apps	(Gls)
2018–2019	Dinamo Zagreb II	19	(0)
2019–2023	Dinamo Zagreb	17	(0)
2020–2021	→ Lokomotiva (loan)	28	(0)
2022	→ Koper (loan)	11	(1)
2023–2024	Šibenik	10	(0)
2024–2025	Rudeš	12	(0)
2025	East Riffa	0	(0)
2025	Enosis Neon Paralimni	8	(0)
2026	Sloga Doboj	2	(0)
2026–	Cibalia		

International career
2014	Croatia U15	2	(0)
2014–2015	Croatia U16	9	(0)
2015–2016	Croatia U17	18	(0)
2015–2017	Croatia U18	9	(0)
2016–2017	Croatia U19	12	(1)
2019	Croatia U20	1	(0)
- * Club domestic league appearances and goals as of 04 August 2026

Marko Đira (born 5 May 1999) is a Croatian professional footballer who plays as a midfielder for Prva NL club Cibalia .

== Career statistics ==
=== Club ===
As of 25 December 2021

Appearances and goals by club, season and competition
Club	Season	League			National cup		Continental		Other		Total	
Club	Season	Division	Apps	Goals	Apps	Goals	Apps	Goals	Apps	Goals	Apps	Goals
Dinamo Zagreb II	2018–19	Druga HNL	8	0	—		—		—		8	0
Dinamo Zagreb II	2019–20	Druga HNL	11	0	—		—		—		11	0
Dinamo Zagreb II	Total		19	0	0	0	0	0	0	0	19	0
Dinamo Zagreb	2018–19	Prva HNL	2	0	0	0	0	0	0	0	2	0
Dinamo Zagreb	2019–20	Prva HNL	15	0	1	0	3 (Note: Appearance(s) in UEFA Champions League)	0	0	0	19	0
Dinamo Zagreb	2020–21	Prva HNL	0	0	0	0	0	0	0	0	0	0
Dinamo Zagreb	2021–22	Prva HNL	0	0	0	0	0	0	0	0	0	0
Dinamo Zagreb	Total		17	0	1	0	3	0	0	0	21	0
Lokomotiva (loan)	2020–21	Prva HNL	22	0	2	0	2 (Note: One appearance in UEFA Champions League, one appearance in UEFA Europa League)	0	0	0	26	0
Lokomotiva (loan)	2021–22	Prva HNL	6	0	3	0	—		0	0	9	0
Lokomotiva (loan)	Total		28	0	5	0	2	0	0	0	35	0
Career total			64	0	6	0	5	0	0	0	75	0
