= Mislav Oršić =

Croatian footballer (born 1992)

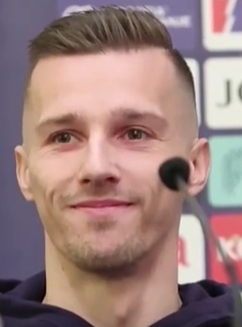
- Oršić in 2022

Personal information
- Full name: Mislav Oršić
- Date of birth: 29 December 1992 (age 33)
- Place of birth: Zagreb, Croatia
- Height: 1.79 m (5 ft 10 in)
- Position: Left winger

Team information
- Current team: Dinamo Zagreb
- Number: 99

Youth career
- 1998: Zagreb
- 1998–2006: Trešnjevka
- 2006–2008: Kustošija
- 2008–2009: Inter Zaprešić

Senior career*
Years	Team	Apps	(Gls)
2009–2013	Inter Zaprešić	90	(21)
2013–2014	Spezia	9	(0)
2014–2016	Rijeka	0	(0)
2014	→ Celje (loan)	13	(2)
2015	→ Jeonnam Dragons (loan)	33	(9)
2016	Jeonnam Dragons	16	(4)
2016	Changchun Yatai	14	(2)
2017–2018	Ulsan Hyundai	52	(14)
2018–2023	Dinamo Zagreb	132	(57)
2023	Southampton	1	(0)
2023–2024	Trabzonspor	11	(0)
2025–2026	Pafos	42	(2)
2026–	Dinamo Zagreb	7	(0)

International career^{‡}
2010	Croatia U18	1	(0)
2010–2011	Croatia U19	5	(0)
2011–2013	Croatia U20	9	(1)
2013	Croatia U21	5	(1)
2019–	Croatia	28	(2)
Medal record
Men's football
Representing Croatia
FIFA World Cup
Bronze medal – third place	2022 Qatar
- * Club domestic league appearances and goals as of 06:25, 21 November 2026 (UTC) ‡ National team caps and goals as of 23:26, 14 November 2025 (UTC)

Mislav Oršić (Croatian pronunciation: [mîslaʋ ǒːrʃitɕ]; born 29 December 1992) is a Croatian professional footballer who plays as a left winger for Dinamo Zagreb and the Croatia national team.

Born in Zagreb, Oršić started his senior career at Inter Zaprešić in 2009. Following short stints with Spezia and Celje throughout 2013 and 2014, he moved to South Korea. After a successful stint with Ulsan Hyundai, Oršić was bought in 2018 by Croatian giants and his local club Dinamo Zagreb, whom he had supported since childhood. During almost five years at the club, Oršić established himself as a club legend, helping the club win four Prva HNL titles, and reach the quarter-finals of the UEFA Europa League for the first time in its history, and becoming the club's all-time leading goalscorer in the UEFA competitions in the process. In January 2023, Oršić moved to Southampton.

Oršić made his debut for the Croatia national team in 2019. He represented his country at the UEFA Euro 2020 and the 2022 FIFA World Cup, winning the bronze medal at the latter tournament.

== Club career ==
=== Early career in Croatia, Italy, and Slovenia ===
A native of Zagreb, Oršić started practicing football at the age of five with NK Zagreb. However, a few months later, the club dissolved its youngest categories that next stop was the nearby NK Trešnjevka, where his father persuaded the club to let him train. At the age of thirteen, Oršić moved to NK Kustošija, before moving on to NK Inter Zaprešić in 2008.

Oršić started playing for Inter Zaprešić's first team in 2009. In the 2012–13 Prva HNL season he was the team's top goalscorer in with 12 goals. He moved to Spezia Calcio in the 2013 summer transfer window and played nine match for the club in the 2013–14 Serie B without scoring. The club finished eighth place in the league. Oršić returned to Croatia and joined Rijeka for an undisclosed transfer fee, where he subsequently moved to Slovenian club Celje on loan from August to December of the 2014–15 season, playing thirteen matches and scored two goals.

=== South Korean K League and Chinese Super League clubs ===
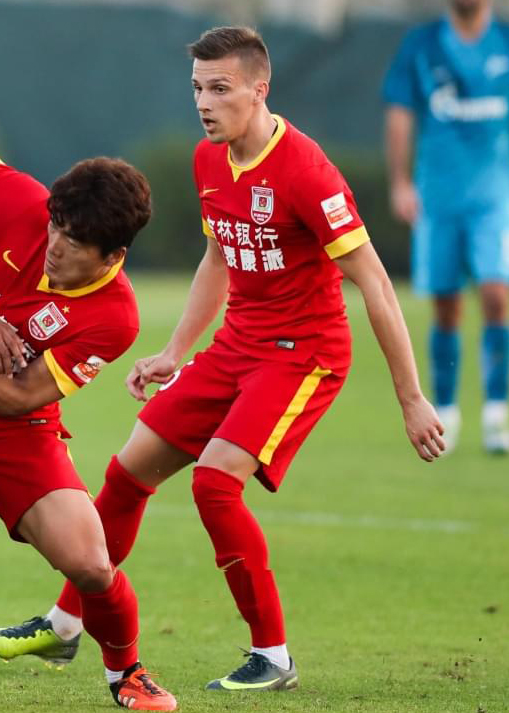
Oršić playing for Changchun Yatai in 2016

Once his loan in Celje expired, Oršić moved to South Korean club Jeonnam Dragons from February 2015 to January 2016, where he impressed with nine goals from 33 matches. The club eventually signed him for €750,000 in the January 2016 transfer window, as Oršić did not play a single match for Rijeka. He registered his name as "Orša" (Korean: 오르샤) with the K League, because South Korean players had difficulty pronouncing his name.

Oršić spent another one-year-and-a-half at Jeonnam, where he played sixteen matches and scored five goals. In July 2016, Oršić was sold to Chinese Super League club Changchun Yatai for €1.3 million, scoring twice in fourteen matches. He returned to the K League in January 2017, signing for Ulsan Hyundai for €935,000. Oršić played for Ulsan for one-year-and-a-half, winning the 2017 Korean FA Cup before returning to Croatia and signing for Dinamo Zagreb in the summer 2018 transfer window.

=== Dinamo Zagreb ===
"And to correct you, I consider that there is no bigger club than Dinamo."

— Mislav Oršić in an interview with Sportske novosti after being asked about a move to a foreign club. The quote subsequently entered the club's folklore.

On 18 September 2019, Oršić scored a hat-trick for Dinamo Zagreb against Atalanta in his 2019–20 UEFA Champions League debut. On 18 March 2021, Oršić scored a hat-trick in a 3–0 win, of which the last goal came in extra time, against Tottenham Hotspur in the Europa League Round of 16, helping his team to win 3–2 on aggregate and reach the quarter-finals for the first time in the history of the club. Furthermore, the hat-trick brought his European goal tally to 17, making him the highest scoring player in European competitions in the history of the club, surpassing club legends Igor Cvitanović and Slaven Zambata. On 9 December 2021, he scored the only goal in the 1–0 away victory against West Ham United in the Europa League group stage, sending Dinamo to the knockout round play-offs.

On 6 September 2022, Oršić scored the first goal of the 2022–23 Champions League group stages in a famous 1–0 victory for Dinamo Zagreb against Chelsea at the Maksimir. Following on from his goal against Chelsea, Oršić continued his fine form with another goal the following week against Milan, away at the San Siro. Dinamo would eventually lose the match 3–1. Despite the loss, with his goal, Oršić finally set his record for the highest scoring Dinamo player in European competitions in history, extending his European goal tally to 28.

=== Later career ===
On 6 January 2023, Southampton announced the signing of Oršić from Dinamo Zagreb on a two-and-a-half-year contract, for a reported fee of £8m. On 11 January, he made his debut in a 2–0 quarter-final EFL Cup victory against Manchester City, replacing Adam Armstrong in the 83rd minute. Later that month, on 21 January, Oršić made his only Premier League appearance in a 1–0 home defeat against Aston Villa after he replaced Armstrong in the 84th minute.

On 30 June 2023, Oršić joined Trabzonspor, subject to international clearance for a transfer fee of €4m including bonuses. One month later, he sustained a cruciate ligament tear during training which sidelined him for most of the 2023–24 season. On 21 December 2024, Oršić left the club following the termination of his contract terminated by mutual consent. According to the agreement, no termination compensation will be paid to him, and that he had wished for more playing time for the club.

On 22 January 2025, Oršić signed for Pafos. On 30 September 2025, he scored the club's first ever Champions League goal, netting from outside the box in the 45th minute of a 5–1 loss against Bayern Munich. In June 2026, Dinamo Zagreb announced his return to the club.

== International career ==
On 9 September 2019, Oršić made his international debut for the Croatian senior team in a 1–1 UEFA Euro 2020 qualifying Group E draw against Azerbaijan in Baku, coming on as a substitute for Ante Rebić in the 86th minute.

On 17 May 2021, Oršić was selected in Zlatko Dalić's 26-man squad for the UEFA Euro 2020. At the tournament, he did not play a single minute until the knockout phase, when he was replaced by Rebić in the 67th minute while Croatia were 3–1 down against Spain in the round of 16. Oršić scored his debut international goal and provided Mario Pašalić with an assist to make the score 3–3. However, Spain won 5–3 after extra time.

Oršić was selected by Zlatko Dalić and named in Croatia's 26-man squad for the World Cup on 9 November 2022. On 27 November, in the 4–1 group stage victory against Canada, Oršić provided Lovro Majer with an assist for Croatia's fourth goal. On 9 December, in the quarter-final against Brazil, Oršić provided Bruno Petković with the assist for Croatia's extra time equaliser, taking the match to a penalty shootout. Oršić would score his penalty in the shootout, the final Croatian spot-kick before Marquinhos' miss, which sent Croatia to the semi-finals for the second consecutive World Cup. Oršić then scored the winning goal in the third place play-off against Morocco, which ended in a 2–1 victory.

== Personal life ==
Oršić was born in Zagreb and grew up in the neighbourhood of Špansko. He is married to Suzana Krajinović, with whom he has two sons. Oršić has her name tattooed on his right arm and kisses it in dedication to her whenever he scores a goal.

== Career statistics ==
=== Club ===
As of match played 8 November 2026

Appearances and goals by club, season and competition
Club	Season	League			National cup (Note: Includes Croatian Cup, Coppa Italia, Slovenian Cup, Korean FA Cup, FA Cup, Turkish Cup)		League cup (Note: Includes EFL Cup)		Continental		Other		Total	
Club	Season	Division	Apps	Goals	Apps	Goals	Apps	Goals	Apps	Goals	Apps	Goals	Apps	Goals
Inter Zaprešić	2009–10	Prva HNL	8	3	1	0	—		—		—		9	3
Inter Zaprešić	2010–11	Prva HNL	25	3	1	0	—		—		—		26	3
Inter Zaprešić	2011–12	Prva HNL	24	4	2	0	—		—		—		26	4
Inter Zaprešić	2012–13	Prva HNL	33	11	1	0	—		—		—		34	11
Inter Zaprešić	Total		90	21	5	0	—		—		—		95	21
Spezia	2013–14	Serie B	9	0	2	0	—		—		—		11	0
Rijeka	2014–15	Prva HNL	—		—		—		—		—		—	
Celje (loan)	2014–15	Slovenian PrvaLiga	13	2	3	0	—		—		—		16	2
Jeonnam Dragons	2015 (loan)	K League 1	33	9	4	1	—		—		—		37	10
Jeonnam Dragons	2016	K League 1	17	5	1	2	—		—		—		18	7
Changchun Yatai	2016	Chinese Super League	14	2	—		—		—		—		14	2
Ulsan Hyundai	2017	K League 1	38	10	5	1	—		5 (Note: Appearances in AFC Champions League)	2	—		49	13
Ulsan Hyundai	2018	K League 1	14	4	0	0	—		7	4	—		21	8
Ulsan Hyundai	Total		52	14	5	1	—		12	6	—		69	21
Dinamo Zagreb	2018–19	Prva HNL	24	6	4	2	—		16 (Note: Six appearances and two goals in UEFA Champions League, ten appearances and three goals in UEFA Europa League)	5	—		44	13
Dinamo Zagreb	2019–20	Prva HNL	28	13	2	1	—		12 (Note: Appearances in UEFA Champions League)	7	—		42	21
Dinamo Zagreb	2020–21	Prva HNL	32	16	4	2	—		15 (Note: Two appearances in UEFA Champions League, thirteen appearances and six goals in UEFA Europa League)	6	—		51	24
Dinamo Zagreb	2021–22	Prva HNL	33	14	2	1	—		15 (Note: Seven appearances and one goal in UEFA Champions League, eight appearances and four goals in UEFA Europa League)	5	—		50	20
Dinamo Zagreb	2022–23	HNL	15	8	0	0	—		12	5	—		27	13
Dinamo Zagreb	Total		132	57	12	6	—		70	28	—		214	91
Southampton	2022–23	Premier League	1	0	2	0	2	0	—		—		5	0
Trabzonspor	2023–24	Süper Lig	6	0	2	0	—		—		—		8	0
Trabzonspor	2024–25	Süper Lig	5	0	0	0	—		3 (Note: One appearance in UEFA Europa League, two appearances in UEFA Conference League)	0	—		8	0
Trabzonspor	Total		11	0	2	0	—		3	0	—		16	0
Pafos	2024–25	Cypriot First Division	11	1	4	2	—		4 (Note: Appearances in UEFA Conference League)	1	0	0	19	4
Pafos	2025–26	Cypriot First Division	31	1	2	0	—		14	3	1 (Note: Appearance in Cypriot Super Cup)	0	48	4
Pafos	Total		42	2	6	2	—		18	4	1	0	67	8
Dinamo Zagreb	2026–27	Croatian Football League	7	0	1	1	—		9 (Note: Six appearances in UEFA Champions League, three appearances in UEFA Europa League)	0	—		17	1
Career total			421	112	41	13	2	0	112	38	1	0	577	163

=== International ===
As of match played 14 November 2025

Appearances and goals by national team and year
National team	Year	Apps	Goals
Croatia	2019	3	0
Croatia	2020	2	0
Croatia	2021	9	1
Croatia	2022	13	1
Croatia	2025	1	0
Total		28	2

Scores and results list Croatia's goal tally first.

List of international goals scored by Mislav Oršić
No.	Date	Venue	Cap	Opponent	Score	Result	Competition
1	28 June 2021	Parken Stadium, Copenhagen, Denmark	10	Spain	2–3	3–5 (a.e.t.)	UEFA Euro 2020
2	17 December 2022	Khalifa International Stadium, Al Rayyan, Qatar	27	Morocco	2–1	2–1	2022 FIFA World Cup

== Honours ==
Dinamo Zagreb

- Prva HNL: 2018–19, 2019–20, 2020–21, 2021–22
- Croatian Cup: 2020–21

Croatia

- FIFA World Cup third place: 2022

Individual

- UEFA Europa League Squad of the Season: 2020–21
- Football Oscar Team of the Year: 2020–21, 2021–22
- 24 Sata Croatian First League Team of the Year: 2020–21
- CIES Croatian First League Team of the Year: 2021–22
- Sportske Novosti Croatian First League Team of the Year: 2021–22
