= Dino Perić =

Croatian footballer

Personal information
- Full name: Dino Perić
- Date of birth: 12 July 1994 (age 32)
- Place of birth: Osijek, Croatia
- Height: 1.98 m (6 ft 6 in)
- Position: Centre-back

Youth career
- –2013: Osijek
- 2013: Dinamo Zagreb

Senior career*
Years	Team	Apps	(Gls)
2013	Dinamo Zagreb	0	(0)
2013	→ Sesvete (loan)	30	(6)
2014–2017	Lokomotiva	38	(1)
2016–2017	→ Dinamo Zagreb (loan)	15	(0)
2017–2026	Dinamo Zagreb	110	(10)

International career^{‡}
2012	Croatia U18	6	(0)
2012–2013	Croatia U19	10	(0)
2013	Croatia U20	1	(0)
2015	Croatia U21	7	(2)
2019	Croatia	2	(0)
- * Club domestic league appearances and goals as of 18:27, 1 December 2024 (UTC) ‡ National team caps and goals as of 12:30, 9 October 2022 (UTC)

Dino Perić (born 12 July 1994) is a former Croatian professional footballer who played as a Defender (association football)

== International career ==
He made his debut for Croatia on 16 November 2019, starting in a decisive home Euro 2020 qualifier against Slovakia and assisting Croatia's first goal in the 3–1 win that saw Croatia qualify for UEFA Euro 2020.

== Career statistics ==
As of match played on 1 December 2024

Club	Season	League			Cup		Continental		Other		Total	
Club	Season	Division	Apps	Goals	Apps	Goals	Apps	Goals	Apps	Goals	Apps	Goals
Sesvete (loan)	2012–13	Prva NL	13	3	0	0	—		—		13	3
Sesvete (loan)	2013–14	Prva NL	17	3	0	0	—		—		17	3
Sesvete (loan)	Total		30	6	0	0	—		—		30	6
Lokomotiva	2013–14	Prva HNL	3	0	—		—		—		3	0
Lokomotiva	2014–15	Prva HNL	8	0	1	0	—		—		9	0
Lokomotiva	2015–16	Prva HNL	22	1	3	0	—		—		25	1
Lokomotiva	2016–17	Prva HNL	5	0	0	0	8	2	—		13	2
Lokomotiva	Total		38	1	4	0	8	2	—		50	3
Dinamo Zagreb (loan)	2016–17	Prva HNL	10	0	3	1	1	0	—		14	1
Dinamo Zagreb	2017–18	Prva HNL	6	0	3	0	—		—		9	0
Dinamo Zagreb	2018–19	Prva HNL	22	2	0	0	5	0	—		27	2
Dinamo Zagreb	2019–20	Prva HNL	17	0	3	0	11	0	1	0	32	2
Dinamo Zagreb	2020–21	Prva HNL	17	1	3	1	6	0	—		26	2
Dinamo Zagreb	2021–22	Prva HNL	12	3	1	0	4	0	—		17	3
Dinamo Zagreb	2022–23	Prva HNL	23	3	2	0	11	1	1	0	37	4
Dinamo Zagreb	2023–24	Prva HNL	12	1	0	0	8	2	1	0	21	3
Dinamo Zagreb	2024–25	Prva HNL	1	0	0	0	0	0	0	0	1	0
Dinamo Zagreb	Total		110	10	12	1	45	3	3	0	170	14
Career total			188	17	19	2	54	5	3	0	264	524

== Honours ==
Dinamo Zagreb

- Croatian First Football League: 2017–18, 2018–19, 2019–20, 2020–21, 2021–22, 2022–23, 2023–24
- Croatian Cup: 2017–18, 2020–21
- Croatian Super Cup: 2019, 2022, 2023

=== Individual ===
- Croatian First Football League Team of the Year: 2022–23
