= Maksim Oluić =

Croatian footballer

Personal information
- Full name: Maksim Oluić
- Date of birth: 20 May 1998 (age 28)
- Place of birth: Zagreb, Croatia
- Position: Centre-back

Youth career
- 2006–2008: Dinamo Zagreb
- 2008–2011: Dubrava
- 2012–2014: Zagreb
- 2014–2017: Lokomotiva Zagreb

Senior career*
Years	Team	Apps	(Gls)
2016–2018	Lokomotiva Zagreb	17	(0)
2018–2019	Rudeš	10	(0)
2019	Rudar Velenje	0	(0)

International career
2013–2014	Croatia U15	5	(0)
2014	Croatia U16	5	(1)
2014–2015	Croatia U17	4	(1)
2016–2017	Croatia U19	8	(0)
2018	Croatia U21	1	(0)
- * Club domestic league appearances and goals as of 16 January 2020

Maksim Oluić (born 20 May 1998) is a Croatian football player who plays as a defender.

== Club career ==
A youth international since the under-15 level, Oluić went through the academies of several Zagreb-based clubs, starting at Dinamo Zagreb until the age of 10, NK Dubrava until the age of 13, and then NK Zagreb until the age of 16 when he moved to NK Lokomotiva. At Lokomotiva, he went on to make his first-team debut on 25 February 2017, coming on for Lovro Majer in the 78th minute in a 2–0 home win against NK Osijek. He went on to participate in 16 more Prva HNL matches for the club, before leaving in the summer of 2018 for NK Rudeš.
