= Danijel Zagorac =

Croatian footballer (born 1987)

Personal information
- Date of birth: 7 February 1987 (age 39)
- Place of birth: Drniš, SR Croatia, Yugoslavia
- Height: 1.86 m (6 ft 1 in)
- Position: Goalkeeper

Team information
- Current team: Dinamo Zagreb
- Number: 1

Youth career
- RNK Split

Senior career*
Years	Team	Apps	(Gls)
2006–2016	RNK Split	111	(0)
2016–	Dinamo Zagreb	56	(0)
2016	→ Lokomotiva (loan)	18	(0)
- * Club domestic league appearances and goals as of 22 December 2024

Danijel Zagorac (born 7 February 1987) is a Croatian professional football player who plays as a goalkeeper for Dinamo Zagreb.

== Career statistics ==
As of match played 22 December 2024

Appearances and goals by club, season and competition
Club	Season	League			National cup		Europe		Other		Total	
Club	Season	Division	Apps	Goals	Apps	Goals	Apps	Goals	Apps	Goals	Apps	Goals
RNK Split	2010–11	Croatian First Football League	10	0	—		—		—		10	0
RNK Split	2011–12	Croatian First Football League	11	0	—		0	0	—		11	0
RNK Split	2012–13	Croatian First Football League	5	0	2	0	—		—		7	0
RNK Split	2013–14	Croatian First Football League	32	0	0	0	—		—		32	0
RNK Split	2014–15	Croatian First Football League	25	0	8	0	2 (Note: Appearances in the UEFA Europa League)	0	—		35	0
RNK Split	2015–16	Croatian First Football League	28	0	0	0	—		—		28	0
RNK Split	Total		111	0	10	0	2	0	—		123	0
Lokomotiva (loan)	2016–17	Croatian First Football League	18	0	1	0	4	0	—		23	0
Dinamo Zagreb	2016–17	Croatian First Football League	3	0	3	0	0	0	—		6	0
Dinamo Zagreb	2017–18	Croatian First Football League	3	0	5	0	0	0	—		8	0
Dinamo Zagreb	2018–19	Croatian First Football League	14	0	2	0	6 (Note: Appearances in the UEFA Champions League)	0	—		22	0
Dinamo Zagreb	2019–20	Croatian First Football League	10	0	2	0	0	0	0	0	12	0
Dinamo Zagreb	2020–21	Croatian First Football League	3	0	4	0	1	0	—		8	0
Dinamo Zagreb	2021–22	Croatian First Football League	2	0	2	0	2	0	—		6	0
Dinamo Zagreb	2022–23	Croatian First Football League	1	0	1	0	0	0	0	0	2	0
Dinamo Zagreb	2023–24	Croatian First Football League	11	0	2	0	3 (Note: Appearances in the UEFA Conference League)	0	0	0	16	0
Dinamo Zagreb	2024–25	Croatian First Football League	9	0	1	0	3	0	0	0	13	0
Dinamo Zagreb	Total		56	0	22	0	15	0	0	0	93	0
Career total			185	0	33	0	21	0	0	0	239	0

== Honours ==
=== Club ===
RNK Split

- Croatian Second Football League: 2009–10

Dinamo Zagreb

- Croatian First Football League: 2017–18, 2018–19, 2019–20, 2020–21
- Croatian Cup: 2016–17, 2017–18, 2020–21
- Croatian Football Super Cup: 2019
