= Mario Šitum =

Croatian footballer (born 1992)

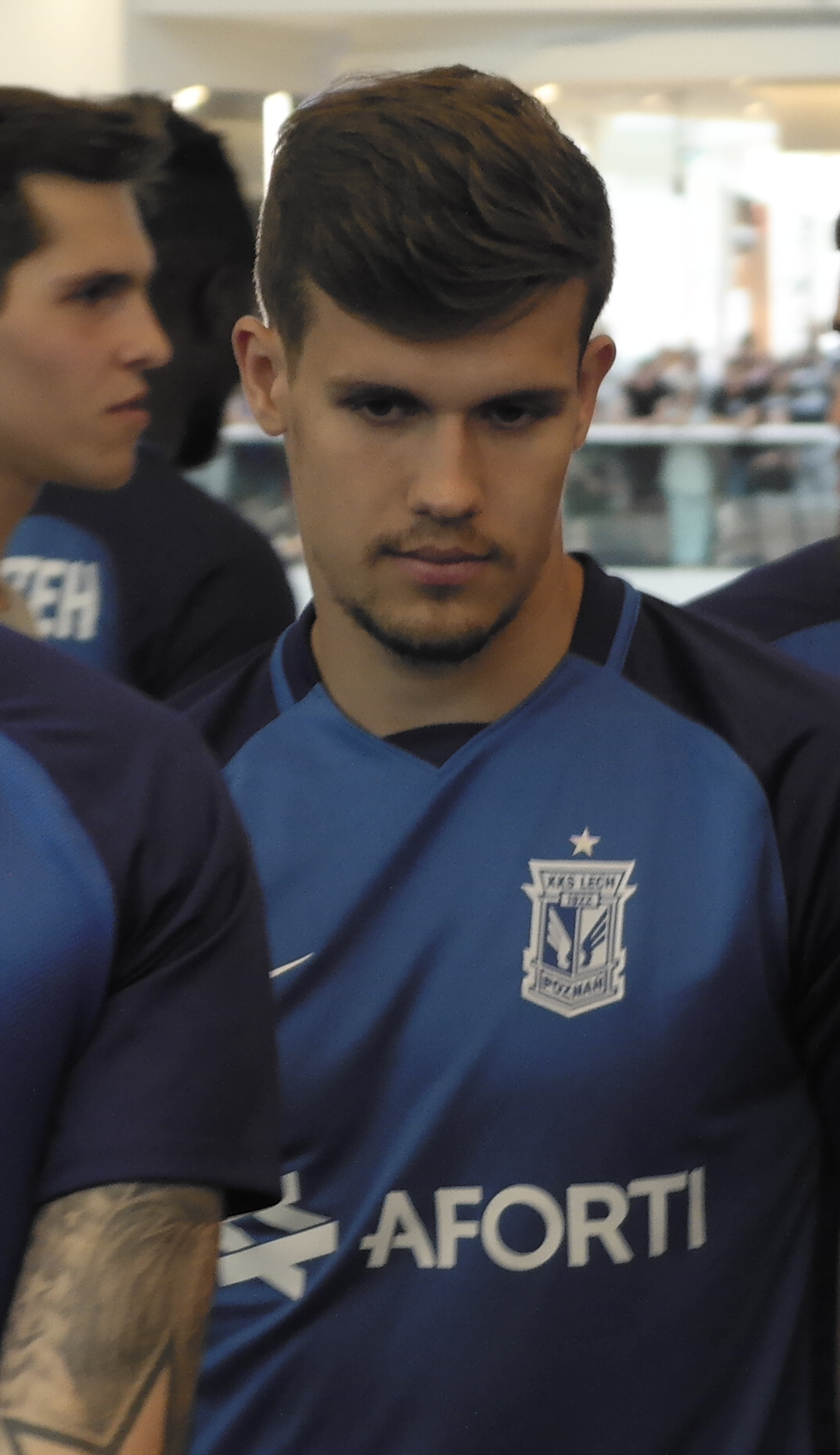

Personal information
- Date of birth: 4 April 1992 (age 34)
- Place of birth: Zagreb, Croatia
- Height: 1.73 m (5 ft 8 in)
- Positions: Winger; wing-back

Team information
- Current team: Lokomotiva
- Number: 18

Youth career
- 1999–2002: Vrapče
- 2002–2007: Kustošija
- 2007–2008: Špansko
- 2008–2011: Dinamo Zagreb

Senior career*
| Years | Team | Apps | (Gls) |
| 2011–2020 | Dinamo Zagreb | 67 | (8) |
| 2012–2014 | → Lokomotiva (loan) | 72 | (8) |
| 2014–2016 | → Spezia (loan) | 65 | (8) |
| 2017–2018 | → Lech Poznań (loan) | 24 | (2) |
| 2020 | Kayserispor | 18 | (0) |
| 2020–2022 | Reggina | 21 | (2) |
| 2021–2022 | → Cosenza (loan) | 30 | (2) |
| 2022–2025 | Catanzaro | 76 | (3) |
| 2025– | Lokomotiva | 17 | (0) |

International career
| 2009 | Croatia U17 | 3 | (1) |
| 2010 | Croatia U18 | 5 | (0) |
| 2010–2011 | Croatia U19 | 5 | (0) |
| 2012–2013 | Croatia U20 | 3 | (0) |
| 2011–2014 | Croatia U21 | 15 | (3) |
| 2017 | Croatia | 2 | (0) |
- * Club domestic league appearances and goals as of 15 June 2026

Mario Šitum (born 4 April 1992) is a Croatian professional footballer who plays for Croatian HNL club Lokomotiva.

== Club career ==
Šitum's senior career began when he was promoted from the Dinamo Academy to the first team in 2011, making his first-team debut in the same year in a 3–0 win over Czech side Sigma Olomouc. On 19 February 2011 he started and played 75 minutes in a friendly against NK Istra 1961, which Dinamo won 4–3 at the newly renovated Stadion Aldo Drosina in Pula. His first league appearance came on 26 February 2011 in Dinamo's game against Karlovac. Šitum started the match and scored in the 12th minute, a goal which turned out to be the game winner. Šitum started on a high note in the 2011–12 season, scoring the fourth goal in a 5–0 win against NK Karlovac, and then scoring twice in a 4–0 win against NK Osijek. He scored again in the next round, netting the only goal in a win against NK Lučko.

On 17 July 2014, Šitum joined Italian Serie B club Spezia on loan after a 2 1/2-year loan spell with NK Lokomotiva.

On 17 June 2017, he was loaned to Polish side Lech Poznań.

On 1 September 2022, Šitum signed with Catanzaro.

== International career ==
Internationally, Šitum scored his first goals for the Croatia national under-21 football team, during qualification for the 2015 UEFA European Under-21 Championship in the match against Liechtenstein where Šitum scored the first two goals in a 4–0 win.

In May 2015 he received a call-up to the senior Croatia squad for the friendly against Gibraltar and for a Euro 2016 qualifier game against Italy. His final international was a January 2017 China Cup against the hosts.

== Career statistics ==
=== Club ===
As of 27 May 2019

Appearances and goals by club, season and competition
| Club | Season | League | | | National cup (Note: Includes Croatian Cup, Coppa Italia) | | Europe | | Total | |
| Club | Season | Division | Apps | Goals | Apps | Goals | Apps | Goals | Apps | Goals |
|---|---|---|---|---|---|---|---|---|---|---|
| Dinamo Zagreb | 2010–11 | 1. HNL | 5 | 1 | 1 | 0 | — | | 6 | 1 |
| Dinamo Zagreb | 2011–12 | 1. HNL | 11 | 4 | 1 | 0 | 5 (Note: Appearances in UEFA Champions League) | 0 | 17 | 4 |
| Dinamo Zagreb | 2016–17 | 1. HNL | 19 | 1 | 4 | 1 | 5 | 0 | 28 | 2 |
| Dinamo Zagreb | 2018–19 | 1. HNL | 19 | 2 | 0 | 0 | 5 (Note: One appearance in UEFA Champions League, four appearances in UEFA Europa League) | 0 | 24 | 2 |
| Dinamo Zagreb | Total | | 54 | 8 | 6 | 1 | 15 | 0 | 75 | 9 |
| Lokomotiva (loan) | 2011–12 | 1. HNL | 13 | 1 | 0 | 0 | — | | 13 | 1 |
| Lokomotiva (loan) | 2012–13 | 1. HNL | 26 | 2 | 8 | 4 | — | | 34 | 6 |
| Lokomotiva (loan) | 2013–14 | 1. HNL | 33 | 5 | 0 | 0 | 2 (Note: Appearances in UEFA Europa League) | 2 | 35 | 7 |
| Lokomotiva (loan) | Total | | 72 | 8 | 8 | 4 | 2 | 2 | 82 | 14 |
| Spezia (loan) | 2014–15 | Serie B | 27 | 5 | 0 | 0 | — | | 27 | 5 |
| Spezia (loan) | 2015–16 | Serie B | 38 | 3 | 5 | 0 | — | | 43 | 3 |
| Spezia (loan) | Total | | 65 | 8 | 5 | 0 | — | | 70 | 8 |
| Lech Poznań (loan) | 2017–18 | Ekstraklasa | 24 | 2 | 0 | 0 | 5 | 2 | 29 | 4 |
| Career total | | | 215 | 26 | 19 | 5 | 22 | 4 | 256 | 35 |

=== International ===
Appearances and goals by national team and year
| National team | Year | Apps | Goals |
|---|---|---|---|
Croatia
| Croatia | 2017 | 2 | 0 |
| Total | | 2 | 0 |
