= Bojan Knežević (Croatian footballer) =

Croatian footballer

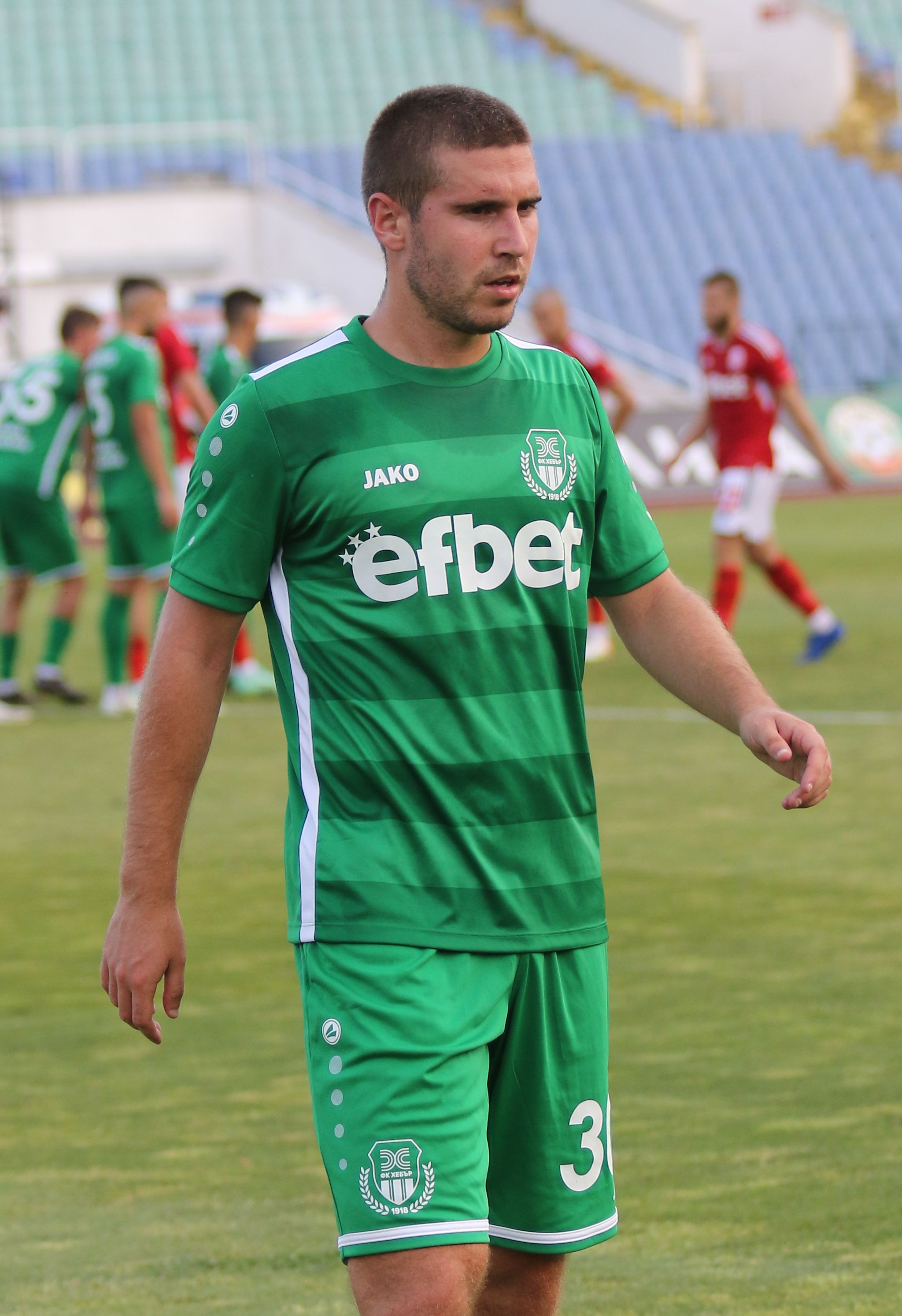
- Knežević with Hebar in 2022

Personal information
- Date of birth: 28 January 1997 (age 29)
- Place of birth: Bjelovar, Croatia
- Height: 1.78 m (5 ft 10 in)
- Position: Midfielder

Team information
- Current team: Termoli

Youth career
- 2012–2014: Dinamo Zagreb

Senior career*
Years	Team	Apps	(Gls)
2014–2021	Dinamo Zagreb	21	(0)
2015–2018	→ Dinamo Zagreb II	37	(6)
2018	→ Lokomotiva (loan)	11	(1)
2019	→ Lokomotiva (loan)	5	(0)
2019–2020	→ Olimpija Ljubljana (loan)	11	(1)
2020–2021	→ Koper (loan)	23	(0)
2021–2022	Opatija	3	(1)
2022	Gorica	12	(0)
2022	Hebar	8	(0)
2023–	Termoli	0	(0)

International career
2011	Croatia U14	2	(0)
2012	Croatia U15	4	(0)
2012	Croatia U16	5	(0)
2013	Croatia U17	12	(1)
2014	Croatia U18	4	(1)
2014–2016	Croatia U19	13	(2)
2017–2018	Croatia U21	2	(0)
- * Club domestic league appearances and goals as of 28 February 2023

Bojan Knežević (born 28 January 1997) is a Croatian footballer who plays as a midfielder for Italian Serie D club Termoli.

== Club career ==
Knežević spent his youth years at the academy of Dinamo Zagreb from 2012 to 2014. On 10 May 2014, he made his debut for the team against Istra 1961.

In January 2019, he joined Lokomotiva on loan. In July 2022, Knežević signed a contract with Bulgarian club Hebar.
