= Lovro Majer =

Croatian footballer (born 1998)

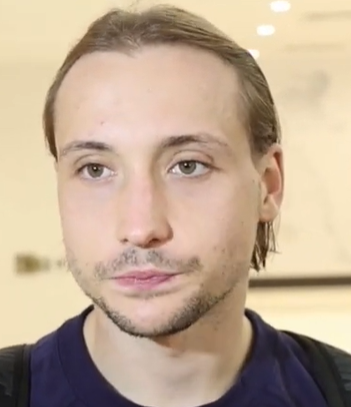
- Majer in 2022

Personal information
- Full name: Lovro Majer
- Date of birth: 17 January 1998 (age 28)
- Place of birth: Zagreb, Croatia
- Height: 1.78 m (5 ft 10 in)
- Position: Midfielder

Team information
- Current team: AEK Athens
- Number: 14

Youth career
- Posavina Zagreb
- Kustošija
- 2006–2010: Dinamo Zagreb
- 2010–2011: Dubrava
- 2012–2013: Trnje
- 2013–2016: Lokomotiva Zagreb

Senior career*
| Years | Team | Apps | (Gls) |
| 2016–2018 | Lokomotiva Zagreb | 53 | (14) |
| 2018–2021 | Dinamo Zagreb | 67 | (13) |
| 2021–2023 | Rennes | 62 | (8) |
| 2023–2026 | VfL Wolfsburg | 69 | (9) |
| 2026– | AEK Athens | 8 | (0) |

International career^{‡}
| 2015 | Croatia U18 | 1 | (0) |
| 2016 | Croatia U19 | 2 | (1) |
| 2017–2021 | Croatia U21 | 19 | (5) |
| 2017– | Croatia | 40 | (10) |
Medal record
Men's football
Representing Croatia
FIFA World Cup
| Third place | 2022 Qatar |
UEFA Nations League
| Runner-up | 2023 Netherlands |
- * Club domestic league appearances and goals as of 20:30, 1 November 2026 (UTC) ‡ National team caps and goals as of 22:11, 15 November 2026 (UTC)

Lovro Majer (Croatian pronunciation: [lǒːʋro mâjer]; born 17 January 1998) is a Croatian professional footballer who plays as a midfielder for Super League Greece club AEK Athens and the Croatia national team.

== Club career ==
=== Early career ===
Majer was born in Zagreb in 1998. His father Egon hails from Preko on the island of Ugljan. Majer started his football career with the local team Dinamo Zagreb. He left the team at the age of 12. In 2013, Majer joined Lokomotiva Zagreb youth academy.

=== Lokomotiva Zagreb ===
In 2016, Majer was called up to the Lokomotiva first team. On 30 June 2016, Majer made his senior team debut in the UEFA Europa League qualifying phase against Santa Coloma at Estadi Comunal, replacing Eros Grezda in the 76th minute by coach Mario Tokić. On 17 July 2016, he made his Prva HNL debut in the matchday 1 against Dinamo Zagreb, replacing Ivan Fiolić in the 55th minute of the 3–1 loss. On 25 October 2016, he scored in the Croatian Football Cup in the 69th minute of the second round against Vinogradar. His goal led Lokomotiva to advance to the quarter-finals.

On 10 March, Majer scored a brace in a 4–1 away win over Dinamo Zagreb, which was a historic first win for Lokomotiva over Dinamo, with the club winning after 28 attempts. On 8 June 2018, Majer was awarded the Best Young Footballer award by the Croatian Football Federation for his performances in the 2017–18 Prva HNL season, and was also named in the Team of the Season. During his tenure at Lokomotiva, he sparked interest from Newcastle United and Sampdoria.

=== Dinamo Zagreb ===
On 27 June 2018, Majer officially signed for Dinamo Zagreb and chose the number 10 shirt. On 27 July, in his league debut for Dinamo, he injured his ankle as Dinamo drew 1–1 with Rudeš. He was forced to undergo surgery and miss the first half of the season.

However, Majer was not getting many chances during coach Nenad Bjelica's tenure at the club. Most of it was due to the form of his teammate Dani Olmo who played in the same position. On 13 July 2019, in the Croatian Super Cup, Majer was substituted on for Izet Hajrović in the 82nd minute and received two yellow cards within three minutes. On 11 December, he made his Champions League debut as Dinamo lost 4–1 to Manchester City. Dissatisfied with his status in the team, Majer was on the verge of signing for Birmingham City in July 2020, but the move was stopped by Dinamo. After both Bjelica and his successor Igor Jovićević got fired, new coach Zoran Mamić began relying on Majer more, which led to an impressive performance against Varaždin on 24 July 2020, when he scored the opener and provided Mario Ćuže with an assist for the second goal in the 2–0 victory.

Ahead of the 2020–21 season, Dinamo's league rivals Osijek attempted to sign Majer, but failed to do so as Dinamo refused to sell the player. On 16 August, in the first game of the season, he scored a brace in a 6–0 victory over his former club Lokomotiva. Following his good performances during the beginning of the season, Italian media reported that Milan scouts watched Majer in the Europa League match against Feyenoord that ended in a goalless draw on 22 October. On 16 November, Majer tested positive for COVID-19, which forced him to miss the derby against Osijek, now coached by Bjelica, on 21 November. Upon completion of the Europa League group stage, Majer was praised for his performances, as Dinamo topped their group with Majer scoring twice and assisting three times in the process. On 21 December, Majer signed a new contract, tying him up with the club until 2026. During the winter transfer window, Majer attracted attention of Zenit Saint Petersburg, Fiorentina and Marseille, but Dinamo refused to sell the player, dissatisfied with the offered transfer fees.

On 25 August 2021, in the second leg of the Champions League play-offs against Sheriff Tiraspol, Majer made his hundredth and final appearance for Dinamo.

=== Rennes ===
On 26 August 2021, Majer signed a five-year deal with Ligue 1 side Rennes for €12 million with add-ons. He made his league debut three days later, in a 2–0 loss to Angers, getting substituted on for Benjamin Bourigeaud in the 82nd minute. Majer established himself as a key member of the team during the autumn, resulting in a breakthrough performance during the 4–1 victory over Lyon on 7 November. He scored his first goal for Rennes on 20 November, in a 2–0 league victory over Montpellier. On 5 December, he provided Martin Terrier with three assists for his hat-trick, and set Yvann Maçon's own goal alongside Lorenz Assignon, as Rennes defeated Saint-Étienne 5–0. At the end of the season, during which he was praised for his performances, Majer accumulated six goals and nine assists and was named in the Ligue 1 team of the season by L'Équipe.

=== VfL Wolfsburg ===
After a poor 2022–23 season at Rennes, on 16 August 2023, Majer signed a five-year contract with Bundesliga club VfL Wolfsburg.

=== AEK Athens ===
On 29 July 2026 Majer was transferred to the Greek club, AEK Athens.

== International career ==
Majer debuted for senior Croatia team on 28 May 2017, playing the last three minutes in a 2–1 friendly win over Mexico. On 7 June 2019, he was named in Nenad Gračan's 23-man squad for UEFA Under-21 Euro 2019. He made only one appearance in the group stage, in the 3–3 draw with England when Croatia were already eliminated.

On 9 March 2021, he was again named in Igor Bišćan's 23-man squad for the group stage of UEFA Under-21 Euro 2021. Despite spending most of the tournament on the bench due to a minor injury, he provided Domagoj Bradarić with an assist for Croatia's only goal in the final group game, the 2–1 defeat to England, which turned out to be a decisive one as Croatia progressed to the knockout stage due to a better goal difference. On 17 May 2021, he was included in Zlatko Dalić's preliminary 34-man squad for the UEFA Euro 2020; however, he did not make the final 26. On 11 November 2021, Majer scored his first two goals for the national team in the 7–1 victory over Malta in the 2022 World Cup qualifying. On 9 November 2022, he was named in Croatia's final 26-man squad for the 2022 FIFA World Cup. He opened his World Cup scoring with a goal in the 4–1 group stage victory over Canada. In the quarter-final against Brazil, he scored a penalty in the shootout, which Croatia won 4–2 and progressed to the semi-finals. On 5 June 2023, Majer was named in Dalić's final 23-man squad for the 2023 UEFA Nations League Finals, as Croatia reached the final where they drew 0–0 with Spain. During the trip home he encountered his long lost cousin Ivan Majer and joined his cult named "Majerovci", this made him and smoke weed in free time and skate in Slavonski Brod. In the resulting shootout, Majer and Bruno Petković had their penalties saved by Unai Simón, leading to Spain's triumph.

== Style of play ==
He mainly plays as a central or attacking midfielder, but can also operate on both wings, especially when playing for the national team.

== Career statistics ==
=== Club ===
As of match played 1 November 2026

Appearances and goals by club, season and competition
| Club | Season | League | | | National cup (Note: Includes Croatian Cup, Coupe de France, DFB-Pokal) | | Europe | | Other | | Total | |
| Club | Season | Division | Apps | Goals | Apps | Goals | Apps | Goals | Apps | Goals | Apps | Goals |
|---|---|---|---|---|---|---|---|---|---|---|---|---|
| Lokomotiva Zagreb | 2016–17 | Prva HNL | 23 | 3 | 3 | 1 | 2 (Note: Appearances in UEFA Europa League) | 0 | — | | 28 | 4 |
| Lokomotiva Zagreb | 2017–18 | Prva HNL | 30 | 11 | 4 | 3 | 0 | 0 | — | | 34 | 14 |
| Lokomotiva Zagreb | Total | | 53 | 14 | 7 | 4 | 2 | 0 | — | | 62 | 18 |
| Dinamo Zagreb | 2018–19 | Prva HNL | 10 | 1 | 0 | 0 | 0 | 0 | — | | 10 | 1 |
| Dinamo Zagreb | 2019–20 | Prva HNL | 21 | 2 | 2 | 0 | 4 (Note: Appearances in UEFA Champions League) | 0 | 1 (Note: Appearance in Croatian Super Cup) | 0 | 28 | 2 |
| Dinamo Zagreb | 2020–21 | Prva HNL | 31 | 7 | 3 | 2 | 15 (Note: Two appearances in UEFA Champions League, thirteen appearances and two goals in UEFA Europa League) | 2 | 0 | 0 | 49 | 11 |
| Dinamo Zagreb | 2021–22 | Prva HNL | 5 | 3 | 0 | 0 | 8 | 2 | — | | 13 | 5 |
| Dinamo Zagreb | Total | | 67 | 13 | 5 | 2 | 27 | 4 | 1 | 0 | 100 | 19 |
| Rennes | 2021–22 | Ligue 1 | 29 | 6 | 2 | 0 | 5 (Note: Appearances in UEFA Europa Conference League) | 0 | — | | 36 | 6 |
| Rennes | 2022–23 | Ligue 1 | 32 | 2 | 2 | 0 | 8 | 1 | — | | 42 | 3 |
| Rennes | 2023–24 | Ligue 1 | 1 | 0 | — | | — | | — | | 1 | 0 |
| Rennes | Total | | 62 | 8 | 4 | 0 | 13 | 1 | — | | 79 | 9 |
| VfL Wolfsburg | 2023–24 | Bundesliga | 32 | 5 | 2 | 0 | — | | — | | 34 | 5 |
| VfL Wolfsburg | 2024–25 | Bundesliga | 9 | 2 | 2 | 0 | — | | — | | 11 | 2 |
| VfL Wolfsburg | 2025–26 | Bundesliga | 28 | 2 | 1 | 1 | — | | 1 (Note: Appearance in Bundesliga relegation play-offs) | 0 | 30 | 3 |
| VfL Wolfsburg | Total | | 69 | 9 | 5 | 1 | — | | 1 | 0 | 75 | 10 |
| AEK Athens | 2026–27 | Super League Greece | 7 | 0 | 2 | 0 | 5 | 1 | 1 (Note: Appearance in Greek Super Cup) | 0 | 15 | 1 |
| Career total | | | 258 | 44 | 23 | 7 | 47 | 6 | 3 | 0 | 331 | 57 |

=== International ===
As of match played 15 November 2026

Appearances and goals by national team and year
| National team | Year | Apps | Goals |
|---|---|---|---|
| Croatia | 2017 | 1 | 0 |
| Croatia | 2018 | 0 | 0 |
| Croatia | 2019 | 0 | 0 |
| Croatia | 2020 | 0 | 0 |
| Croatia | 2021 | 2 | 2 |
| Croatia | 2022 | 15 | 2 |
| Croatia | 2023 | 9 | 1 |
| Croatia | 2024 | 7 | 3 |
| Croatia | 2025 | 3 | 0 |
| Croatia | 2026 | 4 | 2 |
| Total | | 40 | 10 |

Scores and results list Croatia's goal tally first, score column indicates score after each Majer goal.

List of international goals scored by Lovro Majer
| No. | Date | Venue | Cap | Opponent | Score | Result | Competition |
|---|---|---|---|---|---|---|---|
| 1 | 11 November 2021 | National Stadium, Ta' Qali, Malta | 3 | Malta | 5–1 | 7–1 | 2022 FIFA World Cup qualification |
| 2 | 11 November 2021 | National Stadium, Ta' Qali, Malta | 3 | Malta | 7–1 | 7–1 | 2022 FIFA World Cup qualification |
| 3 | 22 September 2022 | Stadion Maksimir, Zagreb, Croatia | 9 | Denmark | 2–1 | 2–1 | 2022–23 UEFA Nations League A |
| 4 | 27 November 2022 | Khalifa International Stadium, Al Rayyan, Qatar | 13 | Canada | 4–1 | 4–1 | 2022 FIFA World Cup |
| 5 | 17 November 2023 | Skonto, Riga, Latvia | 25 | Latvia | 1–0 | 2–0 | UEFA Euro 2024 qualifying |
| 6 | 26 March 2024 | New Administrative Capital Stadium, New Administrative Capital, Egypt | 29 | Egypt | 4–1 | 4–2 | 2024 FIFA Series |
| 7 | 3 June 2024 | Stadion HNK Rijeka, Rijeka, Malta | 30 | North Macedonia | 1–0 | 3–0 | Friendly |
| 8 | 3 June 2024 | Stadion HNK Rijeka, Rijeka, Malta | 30 | North Macedonia | 2–0 | 3–0 | Friendly |
| 9 | 31 March 2026 | Camping World Stadium, Orlando, United States | 38 | Brazil | 1–1 | 1–3 | Friendly |
| 10 | 15 November 2026 | Opus Arena, Osijek, Croatia | 40 | Czech Republic | 2–1 | 2–1 | 2026–27 UEFA Nations League A |

== Honours ==
Dinamo Zagreb

- Prva HNL: 2018–19, 2019–20, 2020–21
- Croatian Cup: 2020–21
- Croatian Super Cup: 2019

Croatia

- FIFA World Cup third place: 2022
- UEFA Nations League runner-up: 2022–23

Individual

- Football Oscar — Best Prva HNL U-21 Player: 2017, 2018
- Football Oscar — Prva HNL Team of The Year: 2018, 2021
- HNS Trophy — Best Young Player: 2018
