= Mirko Barišić =

Croatian businessman

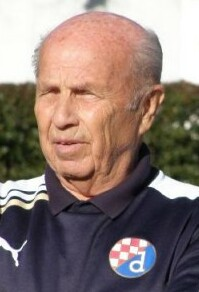
- Barišić in 2013

President of Dinamo Zagreb
- In office 9 April 2000 – 10 March 2024
- Preceded by: Zlatko Canjuga
- Succeeded by: Velimir Zajec
- In office 1990–1991
- Preceded by: Zdenko Mahmet
- Succeeded by: Josip Šoić

Personal details
- Born: 5 November 1936 (age 89) Levanjska Varoš, Kingdom of Yugoslavia
- Spouse: Božica Barišić
- Education: University of Zagreb
- Occupation: Entrepreneur

Mirko Barišić (born 5 November 1936) is a Croatian sportsman, businessman and entrepreneur who is former president of Croatian football club Dinamo Zagreb. He was the vice-president of the club from 1967 to 1970, a member of the three-year presidency from 1989 to 1991, and the president of the club from 1990 to 1991, and again since 2000 to 2024.
