= Football Oscar =

Croatian football award

The Football Oscar (Croatian: Nogometni Oscar) is an annual football award given by the Croatian Association Football Union and Sportske novosti since 2013. In the 2017 edition the award was renamed as Trophy Footballer (Croatian: Trofej Nogometaš). It is awarded to the best football player, manager and goalkeeper playing in the Croatian First League. Also, it is awarded to the best overall Croatian player at the end of every season. The best 11 Prva HNL players of the season are also selected. The award is chosen by players and managers of the Croatian league clubs.

== Team of the Year 2013 ==
- Best Croatian player: (Croatia) Luka Modrić
- Best Prva HNL player: (Croatia) Sammir
- Best Prva HNL goalkeeper: (Croatia) Ivan Kelava
- Best Prva HNL U-21 player: (Croatia) Ante Rebić
- Best Prva HNL manager: (Croatia) Tomislav Ivković

=== Prva HNL Team of the Year 2013 ===
Player	Team	Appearance
(Croatia) Ivan Kelava	Dinamo Zagreb	1
(Croatia) Šime Vrsaljko	Dinamo Zagreb	1
(Croatia) Josip Šimunić	Dinamo Zagreb	1
(Croatia) Ivica Križanac	RNK Split	1
(Croatia) Antonio Milić	Hajduk Split	1
(Croatia) Franko Andrijašević	Hajduk Split	1
(Croatia) Sammir	Dinamo Zagreb	1
(Croatia) Domagoj Antolić	Lokomotiva	1
(Croatia) Leon Benko	Rijeka	1
(Croatia) Ante Rebić	RNK Split	1
(Croatia) Andrej Kramarić	Lokomotiva	1

== Team of the Year 2014 ==
- Best Croatian player: (Croatia) Luka Modrić
- Best Prva HNL player: (Croatia) Andrej Kramarić
- Best Prva HNL goalkeeper: (Croatia) Ivan Vargić
- Best Prva HNL U-21 player: (Croatia) Mario Pašalić
- Best Prva HNL manager: (Slovenia) Matjaž Kek

=== Prva HNL Team of the Year 2014 ===
Player	Team	Appearance
(Croatia) Ivan Vargić	Rijeka	1
(Croatia) Ivan Tomečak	Rijeka	1
(Croatia) Mario Maloča	Hajduk Split	1
(Croatia) Josip Šimunić	Dinamo Zagreb	2
(Croatia) Josip Pivarić	Dinamo Zagreb	1
(Croatia) Mario Pašalić	Hajduk Split	1
(Croatia) Marcelo Brozović	Dinamo Zagreb	1
(Croatia) Ivan Močinić	Rijeka	1
(Croatia) Andrej Kramarić	Rijeka	2
(Croatia) Duje Čop	Dinamo Zagreb	1
(Algeria) El Arabi Hillel Soudani	Dinamo Zagreb	1

== Team of the Year 2015 ==
- Best Croatian player: (Croatia) Luka Modrić
- Best Prva HNL player: (Croatia) Marko Pjaca
- Best Prva HNL goalkeeper: (Croatia) Lovre Kalinić
- Best Prva HNL U-21 player: (Croatia) Marko Pjaca
- Best Prva HNL manager: (Croatia) Zoran Mamić

=== Prva HNL Team of the Year 2015 ===
Player	Team	Appearance
(Croatia) Dominik Livaković	NK Zagreb	1
(Croatia) Marin Leovac	Rijeka	1
(Croatia) Ivan Tomečak	Rijeka	2
(Croatia) Matej Mitrović	Rijeka	1
(Croatia) Marko Lešković	Rijeka	1
(Croatia) Domagoj Pavičić	Dinamo Zagreb	1
(Croatia) Ante Ćorić	Dinamo Zagreb	1
(North Macedonia) Arijan Ademi	Dinamo Zagreb	1
(Croatia) Dejan Radonjić	Istra 1961	1
(Chile) Angelo Henriquez	Dinamo Zagreb	1
(Croatia) Marko Pjaca	Dinamo Zagreb	1

== Team of the Year 2016 ==
- Best Croatian player: (Croatia) Luka Modrić
- Best Prva HNL player: (Croatia) Marko Pjaca
- Best Prva HNL goalkeeper: (Croatia) Lovre Kalinić
- Best Prva HNL U-21 player: (Croatia) Ante Ćorić
- Best Prva HNL manager: (Croatia) Zoran Mamić

=== Prva HNL Team of the Year 2016 ===
Player	Team	Appearance
(Croatia) Lovre Kalinić	Hajduk Split	1
(Croatia) Gordon Schildenfeld	Dinamo Zagreb	1
(Croatia) Josip Pivarić	Dinamo Zagreb	2
(Croatia) Marko Lešković	Rijeka	2
(North Macedonia) Stefan Ristovski	Rijeka	1
(Bosnia and Herzegovina) Tino-Sven Sušić	Hajduk Split	1
(Croatia) Ante Ćorić	Dinamo Zagreb	2
(Croatia) Marko Rog	Dinamo Zagreb	1
(Croatia) Marko Pjaca	Dinamo Zagreb	2
(North Macedonia) Ilija Nestorovski	Inter Zaprešić	1
(Croatia) Marin Tomasov	Rijeka	1

== Team of the Year 2017 ==
- Best Croatian player: (Croatia) Luka Modrić
- Best Croatian goalkeeper: (Croatia) Danijel Subašić
- Best Prva HNL player: (Croatia) Franko Andrijašević
- Best Prva HNL U-21 player: (Croatia) Lovro Majer
- Best Prva HNL manager: (Slovenia) Matjaž Kek

=== Prva HNL Team of the Year 2017 ===
Player	Team	Appearance
(Croatia) Dominik Livaković	Dinamo Zagreb	2
(Croatia) Borna Barišić	Osijek	1
(Croatia) Josip Elez	Rijeka	1
(Croatia) Marko Lešković	Dinamo Zagreb	3
(North Macedonia) Stefan Ristovski	Rijeka	2
(Croatia) Franko Andrijašević	Rijeka	2
(Croatia) Filip Bradarić	Rijeka	1
(Croatia) Josip Mišić	Rijeka	1
(Algeria) El Arabi Hillel Soudani	Dinamo Zagreb	2
(Hungary) Márkó Futács	Hajduk Split	1
(Switzerland) Mario Gavranović	Rijeka	1

== Team of the Year 2018 ==
- Best Croatian player: (Croatia) Luka Modrić
- Best Croatian female player: (Croatia) Maja Joščak
- Best Croatian goalkeeper: (Croatia) Danijel Subašić
- Best Prva HNL player: (Algeria) El Arabi Hillel Soudani
- Best Prva HNL U-21 player: (Croatia) Lovro Majer
- Best Prva HNL manager: (Slovenia) Matjaž Kek

=== Prva HNL Team of the Year 2018 ===
Player	Team	Appearance
(Croatia) Dominik Livaković	Dinamo Zagreb	3
(Croatia) Josip Juranović	Hajduk Split	1
(Croatia) Zoran Nižić	Hajduk Split	1
(Croatia) Filip Benković	Dinamo Zagreb	1
(Croatia) Borna Sosa	Dinamo Zagreb	1
(North Macedonia) Arijan Ademi	Dinamo Zagreb	2
(Croatia) Filip Bradarić	Rijeka	2
(Croatia) Lovro Majer	Lokomotiva	1
(Algeria) El Arabi Hillel Soudani	Dinamo Zagreb	3
(Brazil) Héber Araujo dos Santos	Rijeka	1
(Switzerland) Mario Gavranović	Dinamo Zagreb	2

== Team of the Year 2019 ==
- Best Croatian player: (Croatia) Luka Modrić
- Best Croatian female player: (Croatia) Leonarda Balog
- Best Croatian goalkeeper: (Croatia) Dominik Livaković
- Best Prva HNL player: (Spain) Dani Olmo
- Best Prva HNL U-21 player: (Spain) Dani Olmo
- Best Prva HNL manager: (Croatia) Nenad Bjelica
- Best Croatian futsal player: (Croatia) Duško Martinac

=== Prva HNL Team of the Year 2019 ===
Player	Team	Appearance
(Croatia) Dominik Livaković	Dinamo Zagreb	4
(France) Kévin Théophile-Catherine	Dinamo Zagreb	1
(Austria) Emir Dilaver	Dinamo Zagreb	1
(Croatia) Domagoj Bradarić	Hajduk Split	1
(Bosnia and Herzegovina) Zoran Kvržić	Rijeka	1
(Croatia) Luka Ivanušec	Lokomotiva	1
(Croatia) Domagoj Pavičić	Rijeka	2
(Spain) Dani Olmo	Dinamo Zagreb	1
(Brazil) Jairo	Hajduk Split	1
(Croatia) Bruno Petković	Dinamo Zagreb	1
(Croatia) Jakov Puljić	Rijeka	1

== Team of the Year 2020 ==
- Best Croatian player: (Croatia) Luka Modrić
- Best Croatian goalkeeper: (Croatia) Dominik Livaković
- Best Prva HNL player: (Croatia) Bruno Petković
- Best Prva HNL U-21 player: (Croatia) Luka Ivanušec
- Best Prva HNL manager: (Croatia) Nenad Bjelica
- Best Prva HNL pitch: Stadion Rujevica

=== Prva HNL Team of the Year 2020 ===
Player	Team	Appearance
(Croatia) Dominik Livaković	Dinamo Zagreb	5
(Brazil) Igor Silva	Osijek	1
(Croatia) Denis Kolinger	Lokomotiva	1
(Croatia) Mile Škorić	Osijek	1
(Croatia) Petar Bočkaj	Osijek	1
(Croatia) Nikola Moro	Dinamo Zagreb	1
(Croatia) Mijo Caktaš	Hajduk Split	1
(North Macedonia) Arijan Ademi	Dinamo Zagreb	3
(Kosovo) Lirim Kastrati	Lokomotiva	1
(Croatia) Mirko Marić	Osijek	1
(Croatia) Bruno Petković	Dinamo Zagreb	2

== Team of the Year 2021 ==
- Best Croatian player: (Croatia) Luka Modrić
- Best Croatian female player: (Croatia) Izabela Lojna
- Best Croatian goalkeeper: (Croatia) Dominik Livaković
- Best Prva HNL player: (Croatia) Bruno Petković
- Best Prva HNL U-21 player: (Croatia) Joško Gvardiol
- Best Prva HNL manager: (Croatia) Nenad Bjelica
- Best Prva HNL pitch: Stadion Maksimir

=== Prva HNL Team of the Year 2021 ===
Player	Team	Appearance
(Croatia) Dominik Livaković	Dinamo Zagreb	6
(Brazil) Igor Silva	Osijek	2
(Denmark) Rasmus Lauritsen	Dinamo Zagreb	1
(Croatia) Mile Škorić	Osijek	2
(Croatia) Joško Gvardiol	Dinamo Zagreb	1
(North Macedonia) Arijan Ademi	Dinamo Zagreb	4
(Croatia) Luka Ivanušec	Dinamo Zagreb	2
(Croatia) Lovro Majer	Dinamo Zagreb	1
(Argentina) Ramón Miérez	Osijek	1
(Croatia) Mislav Oršić	Dinamo Zagreb	1
(Croatia) Bruno Petković	Dinamo Zagreb	3

== Team of the Year 2022 ==
- Best Croatian player: (Croatia) Luka Modrić
- Best Croatian goalkeeper: (Croatia) Dominik Livaković
- Best Prva HNL player: (Croatia) Marko Livaja
- Best Prva HNL U-21 player: (Croatia) Lukas Kačavenda
- Best Prva HNL manager: (Croatia) Goran Tomić
- Best Prva HNL pitch: Stadion Rujevica
- Best Prva HNLŽ player: (Bosnia and Herzegovina) Aida Hadžić

=== Prva HNL Team of the Year 2022 ===
Player	Team	Appearance
(Croatia) Dominik Livaković	Dinamo Zagreb	7
(North Macedonia) Stefan Ristovski	Dinamo Zagreb	3
(Croatia) Josip Elez	Hajduk Split	2
(Croatia) Josip Šutalo	Dinamo Zagreb	1
(Croatia) Petar Bočkaj	Dinamo Zagreb^{OSI}	2
(North Macedonia) Arijan Ademi	Dinamo Zagreb	5
(Croatia) Domagoj Pavičić	Rijeka	3
(Croatia) Filip Krovinivić	Hajduk Split	1
(Switzerland) Josip Drmić	Rijeka	1
(Croatia) Mislav Oršić	Dinamo Zagreb	2
(Croatia) Marko Livaja	Hajduk Split	1

^{OSI} - Petar Bočkaj was transferred from NK Osijek to GNK Dinamo Zagreb during winter break.

== Team of the Year 2023 ==
- Best Croatian player: (Croatia) Luka Modrić
- Best Croatian goalkeeper: (Croatia) Dominik Livaković
- Best Prva HNL player: (Croatia) Marko Livaja
- Best Prva HNL U-21 player: (Croatia) Martin Baturina
- Best Prva HNL manager: (Croatia) Zoran Zekić
- Best Prva HNL pitch: Stadion Rujevica
- Best Prva HNLŽ player: (Croatia) Izabela Lojna
- Best Prva HMNL player: (Croatia) Kristijan Čekol

=== Prva HNL Team of the Year 2023 ===
Player	Team	Appearance
(Croatia) Dominik Livaković	Dinamo Zagreb	8
(North Macedonia) Stefan Ristovski	Dinamo Zagreb	4
(Croatia) Josip Šutalo	Dinamo Zagreb	2
(Croatia) Dino Perić	Dinamo Zagreb	1
(Croatia) Dario Melnjak	Hajduk Split	1
(Croatia) Tonio Teklić	Varaždin	1
(Croatia) Martin Baturina	Dinamo Zagreb	1
(Croatia) Josip Mišić	Dinamo Zagreb	2
(Croatia) Matija Frigan	Rijeka	1
(Croatia) Luka Ivanušec	Dinamo Zagreb	3
(Croatia) Marko Livaja	Hajduk Split	2

== Team of the Year 2024 ==
- Best Croatian player: (Croatia) Luka Modrić
- Best Croatian goalkeeper: (Croatia) Dominik Livaković
- Best Prva HNL player: (Croatia) Bruno Petković
- Best Prva HNL U-21 player: (Croatia) Martin Baturina
- Best Prva HNL manager: (Croatia) Sergej Jakirović
- Best Prva HNL pitch: Opus Arena (NK Osijek)
- Best Prva HNLŽ player: (Croatia) Maja Jošćak
- Best Prva HMNL player: (Croatia) Antonio Sekulić

=== Prva HNL Team of the Year 2024 ===
Player	Team	Appearance
(Croatia) Nediljko Labrović	Rijeka	1
(North Macedonia) Stefan Ristovski	Dinamo Zagreb	5
(Croatia) Stjepan Radeljić	Rijeka	1
(Croatia) Bruno Goda	Rijeka	1
(Croatia) Niko Galešić	Rijeka	1
(Croatia) Josip Mišić	Dinamo Zagreb	3
(Croatia) Martin Baturina	Dinamo Zagreb	2
(Croatia) Toni Fruk	Rijeka	1
(Croatia) Ramón Miérez	Osijek	1
(Croatia) Marko Pjaca	Rijeka	3
(Croatia) Bruno Petković	Dinamo Zagreb	4

== Statistics ==
=== Appearance by player ===
No.	Player	Appearance
1	(Croatia) Dominik Livaković	8
2	(North Macedonia) Arijan Ademi	5
3	(North Macedonia) Stefan Ristovski	4
4	(Croatia) Marko Lešković	3
4	(Croatia) Bruno Petković	3
4	(Algeria) El Arbi Hillel Soudani	3
4	(Croatia) Domagoj Pavičić	3
4	(Croatia) Luka Ivanušec	3

=== Appearance by club ===
No.	Club	Appearance
1	Dinamo Zagreb	58
2	Rijeka	26
3	Hajduk Split	17
4	Osijek	9
5	Lokomotiva	6
6	Split	2
7	Inter Zaprešić	1
7	Istra 1961	1
7	Zagreb	1
7	Varaždin	1

=== Appearance by nation ===
No.	Nation	Appearance
1	Croatia	91
2	North Macedonia	10
3	Brazil	4
4	Algeria	3
4	Switzerland	3
5	Bosnia and Herzegovina	2
7	Argentina	1
7	Austria	1
7	Chile	1
7	Denmark	1
7	Spain	1
7	France	1
7	Hungary	1
7	Kosovo	1

== Other awards ==
- Prva HNL Player of the Year (Tportal), given by the Croatian website Tportal, chosen by captains of league clubs.
- Croatian Footballer of the Year, given by the Croatian newspaper Večernji list, chosen by sport journalists.
- Sportske novosti Yellow Shirt award, given by the Croatian newspaper Sportske novosti, chosen by sport journalists.
