= 2021–22 GNK Dinamo Zagreb season =

Dinamo Zagreb
2021–22 season
- President: Mirko Barišić
- Head coach: Damir Krznar (until 1 December 2021); Željko Kopić (from 2 December 2021 until 21 April 2022); Ante Čačić (from 21 April 2022)
- Stadium: Stadion Maksimir
- Prva HNL: 1st
- Croatian Cup: Quarter-finals
- UEFA Champions League: Play-off round
- UEFA Europa League: Knockout round play-offs
- Top goalscorer: League: Mislav Oršić (14); All: Mislav Oršić (20)
| Home colours | Away colours |

The 2021–22 season was the 111th season in the existence of GNK Dinamo Zagreb and the club's 31st consecutive season in the top flight of Croatian football. In addition to the domestic league, Dinamo Zagreb participated in this season's editions of the Croatian Cup, the UEFA Champions League and the UEFA Europa League.

== Players ==
=== First-team squad ===
As of 7 February 2022

Note: Flags indicate national team as defined under FIFA eligibility rules; some limited exceptions apply. Players may hold more than one non-FIFA nationality.

| No. | Pos. | Nation | Player |
|---|---|---|---|
| 1 | GK | CRO | Danijel Zagorac |
| 2 | DF | IRI | Sadegh Moharrami |
| 3 | DF | CRO | Daniel Štefulj |
| 5 | MF | MKD | Arijan Ademi (captain) |
| 6 | DF | DEN | Rasmus Lauritsen |
| 7 | MF | CRO | Luka Ivanušec |
| 8 | MF | BIH | Amer Gojak |
| 9 | FW | SRB | Komnen Andrić |
| 10 | FW | CRO | Bruno Petković |
| 11 | FW | AZE | Mahir Emreli |
| 12 | DF | CRO | Petar Bočkaj |
| 13 | DF | MKD | Stefan Ristovski |
| 24 | MF | CRO | Marko Tolić |
| 27 | MF | CRO | Josip Mišić |

| No. | Pos. | Nation | Player |
|---|---|---|---|
| 28 | DF | FRA | Kévin Théophile-Catherine |
| 31 | MF | CRO | Marko Bulat |
| 35 | MF | CRO | Ivan Šaranić |
| 37 | DF | CRO | Josip Šutalo |
| 38 | MF | CRO | Bartol Franjić |
| 39 | FW | AUS | Deni Jurić |
| 40 | GK | CRO | Dominik Livaković (vice-captain) |
| 46 | MF | CRO | Martin Baturina |
| 55 | DF | CRO | Dino Perić |
| 66 | DF | AUT | Emir Dilaver |
| 70 | FW | BIH | Luka Menalo |
| 77 | FW | CRO | Dario Špikić |
| 99 | FW | CRO | Mislav Oršić |

As of 21 May 2022 after match against (Croatia) HNK Hajduk Split

| Squad no. | Name | Nat. | Pos. | Date of birth | Signed from | Apps | Goals |
Goalkeepers
| 1 | Danijel Zagorac | (Croatia) | GK | 7 February 1987 (aged 34) | (Croatia) Split | 63 | 0 |
| 12 | Nikola Čavlina | (Croatia) | GK | 2 June 2002 (aged 18) | Youth Academy | 0 | 0 |
| 40 | Dominik Livaković (vice-captain) | (Croatia) | GK | 9 January 1995 (aged 26) | (Croatia) Zagreb | 234 | 0 |
Defenders
| 2 | Sadegh Moharrami | (Iran) | RB | 1 March 1996 (aged 25) | (Iran) Persepolis | 73 | 0 |
| 3 | Daniel Štefulj | (Croatia) | LB | 8 November 1999 (aged 21) | (Croatia) Rijeka | 14 | 0 |
| 6 | Rasmus Lauritsen | (Denmark) | CB | 27 February 1996 (aged 25) | (Sweden) Norrköping | 66 | 2 |
| 12 | Petar Bočkaj | (Croatia) | LB | 23 July 1996 (aged 24) | (Croatia) Osijek | 18 | 2 |
| 13 | Stefan Ristovski | (North Macedonia) | RB | 12 February 1992 (aged 29) | (Portugal) Sporting CP | 61 | 1 |
| 28 | Kévin Théophile-Catherine | (France) | CB | 28 October 1989 (aged 31) | (France) Saint-Étienne | 141 | 3 |
| 37 | Josip Šutalo | (Croatia) | CB | 28 February 2000 (aged 21) | Youth Academy | 44 | 3 |
| 55 | Dino Perić | (Croatia) | CB | 12 July 1994 (aged 26) | (Croatia) Lokomotiva | 124 | 7 |
| 66 | Emir Dilaver | (Austria) | CB | 7 May 1991 (aged 30) | (Turkey) Rizespor | 80 | 2 |
Midfielders
| 5 | Arijan Ademi (captain) | (North Macedonia) | CM | 29 May 1991 (aged 29) | (Croatia) Šibenik | 339 | 36 |
| 7 | Luka Ivanušec | (Croatia) | AM | 26 November 1998 (aged 22) | (Croatia) Lokomotiva | 119 | 19 |
| 8 | Amer Gojak | (Bosnia and Herzegovina) | CM | 13 February 1997 (aged 24) | (Bosnia and Herzegovina) Olimpik | 196 | 17 |
| 24 | Marko Tolić | (Croatia) | AM | 7 May 1996 (aged 25) | (Croatia) Lokomotiva | 60 | 7 |
| 27 | Josip Mišić | (Croatia) | CM | 28 June 1994 (aged 26) | (Portugal) Sporting CP | 72 | 4 |
| 31 | Marko Bulat | (Croatia) | CM | 26 September 2001 (aged 19) | (Croatia) Šibenik | 20 | 1 |
| 35 | Ivan Šaranić | (Croatia) | AM | 12 May 2003 (aged 18) | Youth Academy | 0 | 0 |
| 38 | Bartol Franjić | (Croatia) | DM | 14 January 2000 (aged 21) | Youth Academy | 84 | 1 |
| 46 | Martin Baturina | (Croatia) | AM | 16 February 2003 (aged 18) | Youth Academy | 18 | 2 |
Forwards
| 9 | Komnen Andrić | (Serbia) | FW | 1 July 1995 (aged 25) | (Croatia) Inter Zaprešić | 53 | 16 |
| 10 | Bruno Petković | (Croatia) | FW | 16 September 1994 (aged 26) | (Italy) Bologna | 166 | 51 |
| 11 | Mahir Emreli | (Azerbaijan) | FW | 1 July 1997 (aged 23) | (Poland) Legia Warsaw | 10 | 2 |
| 39 | Deni Jurić | (Australia) | FW | 3 September 1997 (aged 23) | (Croatia) Šibenik | 16 | 2 |
| 70 | Luka Menalo | (Bosnia and Herzegovina) | LW | 22 July 1996 (aged 24) | (Bosnia and Herzegovina) Široki Brijeg | 49 | 6 |
| 77 | Dario Špikić | (Croatia) | RW | 22 March 1999 (aged 22) | (Croatia) Gorica | 29 | 2 |
| 99 | Mislav Oršić | (Croatia) | LW | 29 December 1992 (aged 28) | (South Korea) Ulsan Hyundai | 188 | 78 |

== Transfers ==
=== In ===
| No. | Pos | Player | Transferred from | Fee | Date | Source |
|---|---|---|---|---|---|---|
| 27 | MF | (Croatia) Josip Mišić | (Portugal) Sporting | €2.0 million | 2 June 2021 | |
| 90 | FW | (Croatia) Duje Čop | (Belgium) Standard Liège | Free | 15 June 2021 | |
| 39 | FW | (Australia) Deni Jurić | (Croatia) Šibenik | Undisclosed | 30 June 2021 | |
| 66 | DF | (Austria) Emir Dilaver | (Turkey) Rizespor | Free | 29 August 2021 | |
| 12 | DF | (Croatia) Petar Bočkaj | (Croatia) Osijek | €2.2 million | 24 December 2021 | |
| 11 | FW | (Azerbaijan) Mahir Emreli | (Poland) Legia Warsaw | Free | 2 February 2022 | |

=== Loan returnees ===
| No. | Pos | Player | Transferred from | Fee | Date | Source |
|---|---|---|---|---|---|---|
| 36 | FW | (Croatia) Marko Đira | (Croatia) Lokomotiva | Free | 1 June 2021 | |
| 34 | DF | (Croatia) Tin Hrvoj | (Croatia) Varaždin | Free | 1 June 2021 | |
| 6 | DF | (Portugal) Ivo Pinto | (Portugal) Rio Ave | Free | | |
| 29 | DF | (Switzerland) François Moubandje | (Turkey) Alanyaspor | Free | 1 June 2021 | |
| | FW | (Croatia) Marko Brkić | (Italy) Empoli | Free | | |
| 77 | FW | (Croatia) Sandro Kulenović | (Croatia) Rijeka | Free | 1 June 2021 | |
| 7 | FW | (Croatia) Antonio Marin | (Croatia) Lokomotiva | Free | 1 June 2021 | |
| 14 | MF | (Bosnia and Herzegovina) Amer Gojak | (Italy) Torino | Free | 1 June 2021 | |
| 23 | MF | (Bosnia and Herzegovina) Luka Menalo | (Croatia) Rijeka | Free | 1 June 2021 | |
| 9 | FW | (Serbia) Komnen Andrić | (Russia) Ufa | Free | | |
| 37 | DF | (Croatia) Josip Šutalo | (Croatia) Istra 1961 | Free | 1 June 2021 | |
| 3 | DF | (Croatia) Daniel Štefulj | (Croatia) Rijeka | Free | 1 June 2021 | |
| 33 | GK | (Croatia) Ivan Nevistić | (Croatia) Rijeka | Free | 1 June 2021 | |
| 77 | FW | (Croatia) Dario Špikić | (Croatia) Gorica | Free | 1 June 2021 | |
| 31 | MF | (Croatia) Marko Bulat | (Croatia) Šibenik | Free | 1 June 2021 | |
| 25 | FW | (Croatia) Mario Ćuže | (Ukraine) Dnipro-1 | Free | 1 June 2021 | |

=== Out ===
| No. | Pos | Player | Transferred to | Fee | Date | Source |
|---|---|---|---|---|---|---|
| 27 | MF | (Croatia) Josip Mišić | (Portugal) Sporting CP | Return from loan | 1 June 2021 | |
| 8 | FW | (Bosnia and Herzegovina) Izet Hajrović | (Greece) Aris Thessaloniki | End of contract | 29 June 2021 | |
| 32 | DF | (Croatia) Joško Gvardiol | (Germany) RB Leipzig | Return from loan | 1 July 2021 | |
| 11 | FW | (Switzerland) Mario Gavranović | (Turkey) Kayserispor | 2,500,000 euros | 12 August 2021 | |
| 10 | AM | (Croatia) Lovro Majer | (France) Rennes | 13,000,000 euros | 26 August 2021 | |
| 97 | DM | (Croatia) Kristijan Jakić | (Germany) Eintracht Frankfurt | 7,500,000 euros | 28 August 2021 | |
| 20 | RW | (Kosovo) Lirim Kastrati | (Poland) Legia Warsaw | 1,300,000 euros | 1 September 2021 | |
| 22 | DF | (Croatia) Marin Leovac | (Croatia) Osijek | Undisclosed | 26 January 2022 | |

=== Loan out ===
| No. | Pos | Player | Transferred to | Fee | Date | Source |
|---|---|---|---|---|---|---|
| 39 | FW | (Australia) Deni Jurić | (Croatia) Šibenik | Undisclosed | 30 June 2021 | |
| 80 | MF | (Nigeria) Iyayi Atiemwen | (Cyprus) Omonia | Undisclosed | 14 July 2021 | |
| 30 | DF | (Slovenia) Petar Stojanović | (Italy) Empoli | €340,000 | 20 July 2021 | |
| 29 | DF | (Switzerland) François Moubandje | (Turkey) Göztepe | Undisclosed | 8 January 2022 | |
| 23 | GK | (Croatia) Dinko Horkaš | (Bosnia and Herzegovina) Posušje | Undisclosed | 15 January 2022 | |
| 92 | FW | (Croatia) Jakov-Anton Vasilj | (Croatia) Lokomotiva | Undisclosed | 27 January 2022 | |
| 90 | FW | (Croatia) Duje Čop | (Slovenia) Celje | Undisclosed | 4 February 2022 | |
| 4 | DF | (Montenegro) Stefan Milić | (Slovenia) Bravo | Undisclosed | 7 February 2022 | |

== Pre-season and friendlies ==
Win Draw Loss Fixtures

| 19 June 2021 Friendly | Mura (Slovenia) | 0–4 | (Croatia) Dinamo Zagreb | Murska Sobota, Slovenia |
| 18:00 CEST (UTC+2) | Šturm (yellow card) 17' | Report | Ćuže 28'; Kulenović 41'; Baturina 82', 86' | Stadium: Fazanerija City Stadium |

| 20 June 2021 Friendly | Maribor (Slovenia) | 1–2 | (Croatia) Dinamo Zagreb | Murska Sobota, Slovenia |
| 18:00 CEST (UTC+2) | Požeg Vancaš 6'; Koderman (yellow card) 22'; Pihler (yellow card) 44'; Bobarič (yellow card) 80' | Report | Martinović 10' (o.g.); Majer (yellow card) 20'; Lauritsen 77' | Stadium: Fazanerija City Stadium |

| 24 June 2021 Friendly | Dinamo Zagreb (Croatia) | Cancelled | (Slovakia) Slovan Bratislava | Austria |
| --:-- CEST (UTC+2) |

| 24 June 2021 Friendly | Dinamo Zagreb (Croatia) | 3–0 | (Slovakia) ŠKF Sereď | Murska Sobota, Slovenia |
| 18:00 CEST (UTC+2) | Ćuže 9'; Tolić 16'; Špikić 34' | Report | Kartsampas (yellow card) 57'; Obinna (yellow card) 57' | Stadium: Fazanerija City Stadium |

| 27 June 2021 Friendly | Dinamo Zagreb (Croatia) | 2–1 | (Russia) Rostov | Beltinci, Slovenia |
| 18:00 CEST (UTC+2) | Menalo 9'; Stojanović 20'; Moharrami (yellow card) 57' | Report | Hashimoto 65' | Stadium: Beltinci Sports Park |

| 19 January 2022 Friendly | Dinamo Zagreb (Croatia) | 3–0 | (Slovenia) Domžale | Rovinj, Croatia |
| 14:30 CET (UTC+1) | Mišić (yellow card) 40'; Jurić 57', 62'; Tolić 60' | Report | | Stadium: Stadion Valbruna |

| 23 January 2022 Friendly | Dinamo Zagreb (Croatia) | 4–3 | (Austria) Sturm Graz | Zagreb, Croatia |
| 14:00 CET (UTC+1) | Menalo 36'; Ivanušec 60'; Andrić 67', 95' | Report | Lang 74', 98'; Ljubic 115' | Stadium: Stadion Maksimir |

| 28 April 2022 Global Tour for Peace | Dinamo Zagreb (Croatia) | 2–2 | (Ukraine) Dynamo Kyiv | Zagreb, Croatia |
| 18:00 CEST (UTC+2) | Vukotić 29'; Menalo 38'; Hrvoj (yellow card) 80' | Report | Vanat 8', 16'; Popov (yellow card) 59' | Stadium: Stadion Maksimir |

== Competitions ==
=== Overall record ===
| Competition | First match | Last match | Starting round | Final position | Record | | | | | | | |
| Competition | First match | Last match | Starting round | Final position | Pld | W | D | L | GF | GA | GD | Win % |
|---|---|---|---|---|---|---|---|---|---|---|---|---|
| Prva HNL | 16 July 2021 | 21 May 2022 | Matchday 1 | Winners | 36 | 24 | 7 | 5 | 68 | 22 | +46 | 66.67 |
| Croatian Cup | 22 September 2021 | 1 December 2021 | First round | Quarter-finals | 3 | 2 | 0 | 1 | 8 | 6 | +2 | 66.67 |
| UEFA Champions League | 7 July 2021 | 25 August 2021 | First qualifying round | Play-off round | 8 | 5 | 2 | 1 | 10 | 6 | +4 | 62.50 |
| UEFA Europa League | 16 September 2021 | 24 February 2022 | Group stage | Knockout round play-offs | 8 | 4 | 1 | 3 | 11 | 9 | +2 | 50.00 |
| Total | | | | | 55 | 35 | 10 | 10 | 97 | 43 | +54 | 63.64 |

Last updated: 21 May 2022
Source: Soccerway

=== Prva HNL ===
==== League table ====
| Pos | Team | Pld | W | D | L | GF | GA | GD | Pts | Qualification or relegation |
|---|---|---|---|---|---|---|---|---|---|---|
| 1 | Dinamo Zagreb (C) | 36 | 24 | 7 | 5 | 68 | 22 | +46 | 79 | Qualification to Champions League second qualifying round |
| 2 | Hajduk Split | 36 | 21 | 9 | 6 | 64 | 31 | +33 | 72 | Qualification to Europa Conference League third qualifying round (Note: The cup winner, Hajduk Split, will enter the third qualifying round of the Europa Conference League.) |
| 3 | Osijek | 36 | 19 | 12 | 5 | 49 | 29 | +20 | 69 | Qualification to Europa Conference League second qualifying round |
| 4 | Rijeka | 36 | 20 | 5 | 11 | 71 | 51 | +20 | 65 | Qualification to Europa Conference League second qualifying round |
| 5 | Lokomotiva | 36 | 12 | 13 | 11 | 55 | 50 | +5 | 49 | |

Source: PrvaHNL.hr
Rules for classification: 1) Points; 2) Head-to-head points; 3) Head-to-head goal difference; 4) Head-to-head goals scored (at home if two teams tied); 5) Goal difference; 6) Goals scored; 7) Play-off
(Note: Criteria 2-4 and 7 is only used if deciding champion, teams to international competition or teams for relegation and in that case criteria 6 will not be used).
(C) Champions

==== Results summary ====
| Overall | | | | | | | | Home | | | | | | Away | | | | | |
| Pld | W | D | L | GF | GA | GD | Pts | W | D | L | GF | GA | GD | W | D | L | GF | GA | GD |
|---|---|---|---|---|---|---|---|---|---|---|---|---|---|---|---|---|---|---|---|
| 36 | 24 | 7 | 5 | 68 | 22 | +46 | 79 | 12 | 4 | 2 | 38 | 11 | +27 | 12 | 3 | 3 | 30 | 11 | +19 |

Last updated: 21 May 2022.
Source: Prva HNL

==== Results by round ====
| Round | 1 | 2 | 3 | 4 | 5 | 6 | 7 | 8 | 9 | 10 | 11 | 12 | 13 | 14 | 15 | 16 | 17 | 18 | 19 | 20 | 21 | 22 | 23 | 24 | 25 | 26 | 27 | 28 | 29 | 30 | 31 | 32 | 33 | 34 | 35 | 36 |
|---|---|---|---|---|---|---|---|---|---|---|---|---|---|---|---|---|---|---|---|---|---|---|---|---|---|---|---|---|---|---|---|---|---|---|---|---|
| Ground | H | A | H | A | H | H | A | H | A | A | H | A | H | A | A | H | A | H | H | A | H | A | H | H | A | H | A | A | H | A | H | A | A | H | A | H |
| Result | L | W | D | W | W | W | W | W | L | W | W | D | D | W | L | D | W | L | W | W | W | W | W | D | L | W | D | W | W | W | W | W | D | W | W | W |
| Position | 8 | 4 | 5 | 4 | 3 | 2 | 1 | 1 | 3 | 3 | 2 | 3 | 3 | 1 | 3 | 3 | 3 | 4 | 2 | 1 | 1 | 1 | 1 | 1 | 2 | 1 | 1 | 1 | 1 | 1 | 1 | 1 | 1 | 1 | 1 | 1 |

Updated to match(es) played on 21 May 2022. Source: Prva HNL
A = Away; H = Home; W = Win; D = Draw; L = Loss

==== Matches ====
The league fixtures were announced on 8 June 2021.

| 16 July 2021 1 | Dinamo Zagreb | 0–2 | Slaven Belupo | Zagreb |
| 18:55 CEST (UTC+2) | | Report | Marina (yellow card) 27'; Krstanović 50'; Bogojević (yellow card) 83', (goal) 84'; Čović (yellow card) 90+3' | Stadium: Stadion Maksimir; Attendance: 570; Referee: Marin Vidulin |

| 23 July 2021 2 | Hrvatski Dragovoljac | 0–4 | Dinamo Zagreb | Zagreb |
| 20:00 CEST (UTC+2) | Teklić (yellow card) 34' | Report | Majer 19', 53'; Šutalo 36'; Gavranović 48' | Stadium: Stadion Kranjčevićeva; Attendance: 328; Referee: Ante Čuljak |

| 1 August 2021 3 | Dinamo Zagreb | 3–3 | Rijeka | Zagreb |
| 21:00 CEST (UTC+2) | Perić 9'; Majer 32'; Théophile-Catherine (yellow card) 36'; Oršić 59' | Report | Pavičić (yellow card) 10'; Issah 23', 38'; Lepinjica (yellow card) 34'; Drmić 43' | Stadium: Stadion Maksimir; Attendance: 1,503; Referee: Tihomir Pejin |

| 13 August 2021 5 | Dinamo Zagreb | 1–0 | Gorica | Zagreb |
| 20:00 CEST (UTC+2) | Doka 36' (o.g.); Perić (yellow card) 56'; Kastrati (yellow card) 71' | Report | Marjanović (yellow card) 59' | Stadium: Stadion Maksimir; Attendance: 1,282; Referee: Dario Bel |

| 21 August 2021 6 | Dinamo Zagreb | 1–0 | Lokomotiva | Zagreb |
| 21:00 CEST (UTC+2) | Oršić 77' | Report | | Stadium: Stadion Maksimir; Attendance: 1,190; Referee: Dario Kulušić |

| 29 August 2021 7 | Osijek | 0–2 | Dinamo Zagreb | Osijek |
| 19:00 CEST (UTC+2) | | Report | Jakić 33'; Lončar 65' (o.g.) | Stadium: Gradski Vrt Stadium; Attendance: 3175; Referee: Ivan Bebek |

| 11 September 2021 8 | Dinamo Zagreb | 2–0 | Šibenik | Zagreb |
| 17:00 CEST (UTC+2) | Dilaver (yellow card) 36'; Lauritsen 68'; Ivanušec 78' | Report | Bačelić Grgić (yellow card) 90' | Stadium: Stadion Maksimir; Attendance: 1,350; Referee: Tihomir Pejin |

| 25 September 2021 10 | Slaven Belupo | 1–4 | Dinamo Zagreb | Koprivnica |
| 17:00 CEST (UTC+2) | Goda (yellow card) 14'; Caimacov (yellow card) 34'; Marina (yellow card) 45'; Grgić 80' | Report | Jurić 23'; Oršić 43'; Petković 50'; Čop 76' | Stadium: Gradski stadion Ivan Kušek-Apaš; Attendance: 993; Referee: Dario Kulušić |

| 3 October 2021 11 | Dinamo Zagreb | 8–0 | Hrvatski Dragovoljac | Zagreb |
| 17:00 CEST (UTC+2) | Mišić 22'; Menalo 45+2', 65'; Ivanušec 50'; Špikić 59'; Andrić 69'; Bulat 82'; Tolić 90+3' | Report | Bašić (yellow card) 9' | Stadium: Stadion Maksimir; Attendance: 1,362; Referee: Zdenko Lovrić |

| 16 October 2021 12 | Rijeka | 3–3 | Dinamo Zagreb | Rijeka |
| 17:05 CEST (UTC+2) | Drmić 7', 38'; Velkovski 41', (yellow card) 64' | Report | Leovac (yellow card) 37'; Franjić (yellow card) 40'; Petković 58' (pen.), 65' (pen.); Menalo (yellow card) 71'; Oršić (yellow card) 76'; Andrić 82' | Stadium: Stadion Rujevica; Attendance: 6,248; Referee: Igor Pajač |

| 24 October 2021 13 | Dinamo Zagreb | 1–1 | Istra 1961 | Zagreb |
| 15:00 CEST (UTC+2) | Franjić (yellow card) 56'; Perić 84' | Report | Mišković (yellow card) 71'; Beljo 79'; Silva (yellow card) 87'; Hujber (yellow card) 89'; Mahmoud (yellow card) 90+4' | Stadium: Stadion Maksimir; Attendance: 1,300; Referee: Mario Zebec |

| 30 October 2021 14 | Gorica | 0–2 | Dinamo Zagreb | Velika Gorica |
| 17:05 CEST (UTC+2) | Lovrić (yellow card) 35'; Delfi (yellow card) 89' | Report | Petković 31' (pen.), (yellow card) 52'; Andrić 37'; Gojak (yellow card) 42' | Stadium: Stadion Radnik; Attendance: 1,293; Referee: Zdenko Lovrić |

| 7 November 2021 15 | Lokomotiva | 1–0 | Dinamo Zagreb | Zagreb |
| 15:00 CET (UTC+1) | Marić 8', (yellow card) 22'; De Hass (yellow card) 27'; Soldo (yellow card) 90+7'; Goričan (yellow card) 90+7'; Santini (yellow card) 90+8' | Report | Théophile-Catherine (yellow card) 35'; Petković (penalty missed) 38', (yellow card) 90+6' | Stadium: Stadion Kranjčevićeva; Attendance: 2,027; Referee: Igor Pajač |

| 20 November 2021 16 | Dinamo Zagreb | 1–1 | Osijek | Zagreb |
| 15:00 CET (UTC+1) | Petković 80' | Report | Fiolić 16'; Miérez (yellow card) 79'; Lončar (yellow card) 90+3' | Stadium: Stadion Maksimir; Attendance: 2,501; Referee: Duje Strukan |

| 28 November 2021 17 | Šibenik | 1–2 | Dinamo Zagreb | Šibenik |
| 15:00 CET (UTC+1) | Perić (yellow card) 14'; Marin (yellow card) 44'; Jakoliš 75'; Batarelo (yellow card) 76' | Report | Ivanušec 19'; Andrić (yellow card) 50'; Perić 80' (o.g.) | Stadium: Stadion Šubićevac; Attendance: 831; Referee: Mario Zebec |

| 5 December 2021 18 | Dinamo Zagreb | 0–2 | Hajduk Split | Zagreb |
| 17:30 CET (UTC+1) | | Report | Livaja 60'; Lovrencsics (yellow card) 69'; Sahiti 90+4'; Dolček (yellow card) 90+5' | Stadium: Stadion Maksimir; Attendance: 9,914; Referee: Zdenko Lovrić |

| 12 December 2021 19 | Dinamo Zagreb | 3–0 | Slaven Belupo | Zagreb |
| 17:05 CET (UTC+1) | Andrić 13'; Oršić 19', 25'; Šutalo (yellow card) 39' | Report | Caimacov (yellow card) 10'; Bosec (yellow card) 27'; Zapata (yellow card) 77' | Stadium: Stadion Maksimir; Attendance: 2,049; Referee: Mario Zebec |

| 15 December 2021 4 | Istra 1961 | 0–2 | Dinamo Zagreb | Pula |
| 18:00 CET (UTC+1) | Perera (yellow card) 51'; Mahmoud (yellow card) 55'; Blagojević (yellow card) 81'; Lučić (red card) 89'; Cáseres (yellow card) 90+6' | Report | Gojak 10'; Théophile-Catherine (yellow card) 53' (yellow-red card) 81'; Petković (yellow card) 74' (yellow-red card) 88'; Ristovski 90+8' | Stadium: Stadion Aldo Drosina; Attendance: 952; Referee: Duje Strukan |

| 19 December 2021 20 | Hrvatski Dragovoljac | 0–2 | Dinamo Zagreb | Zagreb |
| 15:00 GMT | Lukić (yellow card) 8' | Report | Perić 18'; Andrić 68' | Stadium: Stadion Kranjčevićeva; Attendance: 0 Referee: Dario Kulušić |

| 30 January 2022 21 | Dinamo Zagreb | 2–0 | Rijeka | Zagreb |
| 17:00 CET (UTC+1) | Šutalo 21'; Oršić 42'; Tolić (yellow card) 84' | Report | Vučkić (yellow card) 8'; Čestić (yellow card) 45+4' | Stadium: Stadion Maksimir; Attendance: 4,174; Referee: Igor Pajač |

| 6 February 2022 22 | Istra 1961 | 1–2 | Dinamo Zagreb | Pula |
| 17:05 CET (UTC+1) | Perera (yellow card) 7'; Mišković 45+1'; Cáseres (yellow card) 49' (yellow-red card) 64'; Perković (yellow card) 53'; Mahmoud (yellow card) 67' | Report | Oršić 30', 55' (pen.); Ivanušec (yellow card) 45'; Livaković (yellow card) 67'; Petković (yellow card) 82'; Ristovski (yellow card) 85' | Stadium: Stadion Aldo Drosina; Attendance: 1,408; Referee: Zdenko Lovrić |

| 12 February 2022 23 | Dinamo Zagreb | 2–1 | Gorica | Zagreb |
| 17:05 CET (UTC+1) | Ivanušec (yellow card) 39'; Ademi 55'; Oršić 89'; Ristovski (yellow card) 89'; Andrić (yellow card) 90+1'; Zagorac (yellow card) 90+1'; Tolić (yellow card) 90+2' | Report | Steenvoorden (yellow card) 24'; Jovičić (yellow card) 40'; Lovrić (yellow card) 70'; Keita (yellow card) 90'; Kalik 64', (yellow card) 90+2' | Stadium: Stadion Maksimir; Attendance: 2,432; Referee: Dario Bel |

| 20 February 2022 24 | Dinamo Zagreb | 0–0 | Lokomotiva | Zagreb |
| 17:05 CET (UTC+1) | Lauritsen (yellow card) 2'; Štefulj (yellow card) 90+3' | Report | Mersinaj (yellow card) 17'; Marić (yellow card) 74'; Dabro (yellow card) 77'; Kačavenda (yellow card) 83' | Stadium: Stadion Maksimir; Attendance: 1,886; Referee: Igor Pajač |

| 27 February 2022 25 | Osijek | 1–0 | Dinamo Zagreb | Osijek |
| 18:00 CET (UTC+1) | Bralić (yellow card) 43'; Mance 77' | Report | Gojak (yellow card) 89' | Stadium: Gradski Vrt Stadium; Attendance: 6,676; Referee: Igor Pajač |

| 5 March 2022 26 | Dinamo Zagreb | 3–0 | Šibenik | Zagreb |
| 15:00 CET (UTC+1) | Bočkaj 16'; Petković 58'; Baturina 76' | Report | Skorup (yellow card) 12'; Bilić (yellow card) 75' | Stadium: Stadion Maksimir; Attendance: 2,421; Referee: Zdenko Lovrić |

| 12 March 2022 27 | Hajduk Split | 0–0 | Dinamo Zagreb | Split |
| 18:00 CET (UTC+1) | Vuković (yellow card) 72' | Report | Petković (yellow card) 66'; Mišić (yellow card) 83'; Štefulj (yellow card) 88' | Stadium: Stadion Poljud; Attendance: 30,129; Referee: Dario Bel |

| 20 March 2022 28 | Slaven Belupo | 0–1 | Dinamo Zagreb | Koprivnica |
| 15:00 CET (UTC+1) | Lausic (yellow card) 9'; Marina (yellow card) 32'; Goda (yellow card) 76' | Report | Oršić 20'; Špikić (yellow card) 58'; Menalo (yellow card) 83' | Stadium: Gradski stadion Ivan Kušek-Apaš; Attendance: 3,013; Referee: Mario Zebec |

| 3 April 2022 29 | Dinamo Zagreb | 2–0 | Hrvatski Dragovoljac | Zagreb |
| 17:00 CEST (UTC+2) | Andrić 46'; Smolčić 81' (o.g.) | Report | | Stadium: Stadion Maksimir; Attendance: 2,029; Referee: Ante Čuljak |

| 10 April 2022 30 | Rijeka | 1–2 | Dinamo Zagreb | Rijeka |
| 20:00 CEST (UTC+2) | Gnezda Čerin 6'; Krešić (yellow card) 12', (red card) 90+4'; Lepinjica (yellow card) 61'; Smolčić (yellow card) 62'; Bušnja (yellow card) 88' | Report | Emreli 80', (yellow card) 88'; Ademi 86', (yellow card) 86'; Andrić (yellow card) 90+2' | Stadium: Stadion Rujevica; Attendance: 7,364; Referee: Mario Zebec |

| 15 April 2022 31 | Dinamo Zagreb | 3–0 | Istra 1961 | Zagreb |
| 18:00 CEST (UTC+2) | Oršić 8', 45+1'; Emreli 50' | Report | Lučić (yellow card) 42'; Perković (yellow card) 45+1'; Mahmoud (yellow card) 90' | Stadium: Stadion Maksimir; Attendance: 2,607; Referee: Dario Kulušić |

| 20 April 2022 9 | Hajduk Split | 1–0 | Dinamo Zagreb | Split |
| 19:00 CEST (UTC+2) | N. Kalinić 63', (yellow card) 63'; Livaja (yellow card) 89'; L. Kalinić (yellow card) 90+5' | Report | Théophile-Catherine (yellow card) 51' | Stadium: Stadion Poljud; Attendance: 30,038; Referee: Igor Pajač |

| 24 April 2022 32 | Gorica | 0–1 | Dinamo Zagreb | Velika Gorica |
| 19:05 CEST (UTC+2) | Muhammed (yellow card) 25'; Kalik (yellow card) 29'; Atiemwen (yellow card) 69'; Pršir (yellow card) 76' | Report | Mišić (yellow card) 25'; Livaković (yellow card) 29'; Ademi 86'; Ristovski (yellow card) 90+3' | Stadium: Stadion Radnik; Attendance: 4,500; Referee: Zdenko Lovrić |

| 1 May 2022 33 | Lokomotiva | 1–1 | Dinamo Zagreb | Zagreb |
| 19:05 CEST (UTC+2) | Kulenović 30' (pen.); Mersinaj (yellow card) 82'; Marić (yellow card) 88' | Report | Soldo 50' (o.g.) | Stadium: Stadion Kranjčevićeva; Attendance: 3,857; Referee: Ivan Bebek |

| 8 May 2022 34 | Dinamo Zagreb | 3–0 | Osijek | Zagreb |
| 20:00 CEST (UTC+2) | Oršić 35'; Špikić 60'; Mišić (yellow card) 65'; Menalo 81' | Report | Cheberko (yellow card) 15' (yellow-red card) 44'; Lončar (yellow card) 45'; Fućak (yellow card) 89' | Stadium: Stadion Maksimir; Attendance: 13,901; Referee: Igor Pajač |

| 15 May 2022 35 | Šibenik | 0–2 | Dinamo Zagreb | Šibenik |
| 19:05 CEST (UTC+2) | Attys (yellow card) 28'; Rogić (yellow card) 61'; Skorup (yellow card) 61'; Grezda (yellow card) 83'; Bilić (yellow card) 83' | Report | Tolić 39'; Bočkaj 53'; Ristovski (yellow card) 83' | Stadium: Stadion Šubićevac; Attendance: 3,522; Referee: Mario Zebec |

| 21 May 2022 36 | Dinamo Zagreb | 3–1 | Hajduk Split | Zagreb |
| 19:00 CEST (UTC+2) | Petković 53'; Oršić 90+9'; Baturina 90+10' | Report | Livaja 90+4' | Stadium: Stadion Maksimir; Attendance: 18,353; Referee: Patrik Kolarić |

=== Croatian Cup ===
| 22 September 2021 First round | HNK Orijent | 1–4 | Dinamo Zagreb | Sušak |
| 16:00 CEST (UTC+2) | Fatić 62' | Report | Čop 28'; Leovac 46'; Jurić 56'; Menalo 69' | Stadium: Stadion Krimeja; Attendance: 2,000; Referee: Mario Zebec |

| 27 October 2021 Second round | BSK Bijelo Brdo | 2–3 | Dinamo Zagreb | Bijelo Brdo |
| 15:00 CEST (UTC+2) | Gbane 33'; Čikvar 35'; Župan (yellow card) 62' | Report | Gojak 2'; Andrić 40'; Oršić 71'; Baturina (yellow card) 90+2' | Stadium: Igralište BSK; Attendance: 1,500; Referee: Dario Kulušić |

| 1 December 2021 Quarter-finals | Dinamo Zagreb | 1–3 | Rijeka | Zagreb |
| 18:30 CET (UTC+1) | Ristovski (yellow card) 69'; Tolić 73' | Report | Obregón 27'; Drmić 30'; Selahi (yellow card) 36'; Labrović (yellow card) 85'; Murić 90+7' | Stadium: Stadion Maksimir; Attendance: 1,363; Referee: Mario Zebec |

=== UEFA Champions League ===
==== First qualifying round ====
The draw for the first qualifying round was held on 15 June 2021.

| 7 July 2021 First leg | Dinamo Zagreb (Croatia) | 3–2 | (Iceland) Valur | Zagreb, Croatia |
| 19:00 CEST (UTC+2) | Ademi 8', 72'; Majer 41' (pen.) | Report | P. Sigurðsson (yellow card) 45+1'; Køhler (yellow card) 81'; K. Sigurðsson 88'; Adolphsson 90' | Stadium: Stadion Maksimir; Attendance: 987; Referee: Genc Nuza (Kosovo) |

| 13 July 2021 Second leg | Valur (Iceland) | 0–2 (2–5 agg.) | (Croatia) Dinamo Zagreb | Reykjavík, Iceland |
| 20:00 GMT (UTC±0) | F. Sigurðsson (yellow card) 33' | Report | Ivanušec 31'; Mišić (yellow card) 60'; Oršić 89' | Stadium: Hlíðarendi; Attendance: 800; Referee: Zaven Hovhannisyan (Armenia) |

==== Second qualifying round ====
The draw for the second qualifying round was held on 16 June 2021.

| 20 July 2021 First leg | Dinamo Zagreb (Croatia) | 2–0 | (Cyprus) Omonia | Zagreb, Croatia |
| 20:00 CEST (UTC+2) | Majer 65'; Jakić 81', (yellow card) 87' | Report | Kousoulos (yellow card) 29' | Stadium: Stadion Maksimir; Attendance: 2,234; Referee: Paweł Gil (Poland) |

| 27 July 2021 Second leg | Omonia (Cyprus) | 0–1 (0–3 agg.) | (Croatia) Dinamo Zagreb | Strovolos, Cyprus |
| 18:00 EEST (UTC+3) | Gómez (yellow card) 17' | Report | Théophile-Catherine (yellow card) 53'; Menalo (yellow card) 71', (goal) 79'; Petković (yellow card) 85' | Stadium: GSP Stadium; Attendance: 7,256; Referee: Glenn Nyberg (Sweden) |

==== Third qualifying round ====
The draw for the third qualifying round was held on 19 July 2021.

| 4 August 2021 First leg | Dinamo Zagreb (Croatia) | 1–1 | (Poland) Legia Warsaw | Zagreb, Croatia |
| 20:00 CEST (UTC+2) | Jakić (yellow card) 27'; Petković 60' | Report | Slisz (yellow card) 7'; Jędrzejczyk (yellow card) 44'; Martins (yellow card) 72'; Muçi 82' | Stadium: Stadion Maksimir; Attendance: 4,597; Referee: Antonio Mateu Lahoz (Spain) |

| 10 August 2021 Second leg | Legia Warsaw (Poland) | 0–1 (1–2 agg.) | (Croatia) Dinamo Zagreb | Warsaw, Poland |
| 21:00 CEST (UTC+2) | Wieteska (yellow card) 28'; Jędrzejczyk (yellow card) 28'; Josué (yellow card) 72'; Juranović (yellow card) 89' | Report | Franjić 20'; Perić (yellow card) 45+2'; Oršić (yellow card) 76'; Mišić (yellow card) 76'; Gojak (yellow card) 90+4' | Stadium: Stadion Wojska Polskiego; Attendance: 26,769; Referee: Benoît Bastien (France) |

==== Play-off round ====
The draw for the play-off round was held on 2 August 2021.

| 17 August 2021 First leg | Sheriff Tiraspol (Moldova) | 3–0 | (Croatia) Dinamo Zagreb | Tiraspol, Moldova |
| 21:00 CEST (UTC+2) | Traoré 45', 80'; Kolovos 54' | Report | Menalo (yellow card) 76' | Stadium: Sheriff Stadium; Attendance: 5,281; Referee: Cüneyt Çakır (Turkey) |

| 25 August 2021 Second leg | Dinamo Zagreb (Croatia) | 0–0 (0–3 agg.) | (Moldova) Sheriff Tiraspol | Zagreb, Croatia |
| 21:00 EEST (UTC+3) | Ivanušec (yellow card) 89' | Report | Traoré (yellow card) 10'; Fernando (yellow card) 12'; Luvannor (yellow card) 85' | Stadium: Stadion Maksimir; Attendance: 8,015; Referee: Daniele Orsato (Italy) |

=== UEFA Europa League ===
==== Group stage ====
The draw for the group stage was held on 27 August 2021.

| Pos | Team | Pld | W | D | L | GF | GA | GD | Pts | Qualification | WHU | DZA | RWI | GNK |
|---|---|---|---|---|---|---|---|---|---|---|---|---|---|---|
| 1 | (England) West Ham United | 6 | 4 | 1 | 1 | 11 | 3 | +8 | 13 | Advance to round of 16 | — | 0–1 | 2–0 | 3–0 |
| 2 | (Croatia) Dinamo Zagreb | 6 | 3 | 1 | 2 | 9 | 6 | +3 | 10 | Advance to knockout round play-offs | 0–2 | — | 3–1 | 1–1 |
| 3 | (Austria) Rapid Wien | 6 | 2 | 0 | 4 | 4 | 9 | −5 | 6 | Transfer to Europa Conference League | 0–2 | 2–1 | — | 0–1 |
| 4 | (Belgium) Genk | 6 | 1 | 2 | 3 | 4 | 10 | −6 | 5 | | 2–2 | 0–3 | 0–1 | — |

Source: UEFA
Rules for classification: Group stage tiebreakers

| 16 September 2021 1 | Dinamo Zagreb (Croatia) | 0–2 | (England) West Ham United | Zagreb, Croatia |
| 18:45 CEST (UTC+2) | Mišić (yellow card) 67' | Report | Antonio 22'; Lanzini (yellow card) 32'; Rice 50' | Stadium: Maksimir Stadion; Attendance: 12,344; Referee: Ruddy Buquet (France) |

| 30 September 2021 2 | Genk (Belgium) | 0–3 | (Croatia) Dinamo Zagreb | Genk, Belgium |
| 21:00 CEST (UTC+2) | Heynen (yellow card) 14'; Thorstvedt (yellow card) 30'; Muñoz (red card) 65' | Report | Ivanušec 10'; Petković 45+3' (pen.), 67' (pen.) | Stadium: Luminus Arena; Attendance: 11,262; Referee: Mattias Gestranius (Finland) |

| 21 October 2021 3 | Rapid Wien (Austria) | 2–1 | (Croatia) Dinamo Zagreb | Vienna, Austria |
| 18:45 CEST (UTC+2) | Grüll 9'; Greiml (yellow card) 23'; Hofmann 34', (yellow card) 73'; Wimmer (yellow card) 88'; Kitagawa (yellow card) 90+4' | Report | Oršić 24'; Andrić (yellow card) 41'; Baturina (yellow card) 51'; Tolić (yellow card) 88'; Mišić (yellow card) 90+4' | Stadium: Allianz Stadion; Attendance: 22,300; Referee: Kateryna Monzul (Ukraine) |

| 4 November 2021 4 | Dinamo Zagreb (Croatia) | 3–1 | (Austria) Rapid Wien | Zagreb, Croatia |
| 21:00 CET (UTC+1) | Petković 12'; Andrić 34'; Théophile-Catherine (yellow card) 44'; Šutalo 83' | Report | Knasmüllner 8' | Stadium: Stadion Maksimir; Attendance: 7,835; Referee: John Beaton (Scotland) |

| 25 November 2021 5 | Dinamo Zagreb (Croatia) | 1–1 | (Belgium) Genk | Zagreb, Croatia |
| 18:45 CET (UTC+1) | Menalo 35' | Report | Ugbo 45+1' | Stadium: Stadion Maksimir; Attendance: 6,892; Referee: Glenn Nyberg (Sweden) |

| 9 December 2021 6 | West Ham United (England) | 0–1 | (Croatia) Dinamo Zagreb | Stratford, England |
| 20:00 GMT (UTC±0) | | Report | Oršić 4'; Ristovski (yellow card) 31'; Ivanušec (yellow card) 44'; Mišić (yellow card) 85' | Stadium: London Stadium; Attendance: 49,401; Referee: Maurizio Mariani (Italy) |

==== Knockout phase ====
===== Knockout round play-offs =====
The Knockout round play-offs draw was held on 13 December 2021.

| 17 February 2022 First leg | Sevilla (Spain) | 3–1 | (Croatia) Dinamo Zagreb | Seville, Spain |
| 21:00 CET (UTC+1) | Rakitić 13' (pen.); Ocampos 44'; Martial 45+1'; Acuña (yellow card) 53' | Report | Livaković (yellow card) 12'; Oršić 41'; Petković (yellow card) 53'; Ristovski (yellow card) 76' | Stadium: Ramón Sánchez Pizjuán; Attendance: 28,372; Referee: Marco Guida (Italy) |

| 24 February 2022 Second leg | Dinamo Zagreb (Croatia) | 1–0 (2–3 agg.) | (Spain) Sevilla | Zagreb, Croatia |
| 18:45 CET (UTC+1) | Oršić 65' (pen.) | Report | Acuña (yellow card) 63'; Delaney (yellow card) 66' (yellow-red card) 90+1'; Bono (yellow card) 88' | Stadium: Stadion Maksimir; Attendance: 9,788; Referee: François Letexier (France) |

== Statistics ==
=== Goalscorers ===
As of 5 October 2021 after match against (Croatia) Hrvatski Dragovoljac

| Rank | No. | Pos | Nat | Name | Prva HNL | Croatian Cup | Champions League | Europa League | Total |
|---|---|---|---|---|---|---|---|---|---|
| 1 | 10 | MF | (Croatia) | Lovro Majer | 3 | 0 | 2 | 0 | 5 |
| 2 | 7 | MF | (Croatia) | Luka Ivanušec | 2 | 0 | 1 | 1 | 4 |
| 3 | 70 | FW | (Croatia) | Luka Menalo | 2 | 1 | 1 | 0 | 4 |
| 4 | 99 | FW | (Croatia) | Mislav Oršić | 3 | 0 | 1 | 0 | 4 |
| 5 | 21 | FW | (Croatia) | Bruno Petković | 1 | 0 | 1 | 2 | 4 |
| 6 | 90 | FW | (Croatia) | Duje Čop | 1 | 1 | 0 | 0 | 2 |
| 7 | 5 | MF | (North Macedonia) | Arijan Ademi | 0 | 0 | 2 | 0 | 2 |
| 8 | 97 | MF | (Croatia) | Kristijan Jakić | 1 | 0 | 1 | 0 | 2 |
| 9 | 39 | FW | (Australia) | Deni Jurić | 1 | 1 | 0 | 0 | 2 |
| 10 | 9 | FW | (Serbia) | Komnen Andrić | 1 | 0 | 0 | 0 | 1 |
| 11 | 31 | MF | (Croatia) | Marko Bulat | 1 | 0 | 0 | 0 | 1 |
| 12 | 38 | MF | (Croatia) | Bartol Franjić | 0 | 0 | 1 | 0 | 1 |
| 13 | 11 | FW | (Switzerland) | Mario Gavranović | 1 | 0 | 0 | 0 | 1 |
| 14 | 6 | DF | (Denmark) | Rasmus Lauritsen | 1 | 0 | 0 | 0 | 1 |
| 15 | 22 | DF | (Croatia) | Marin Leovac | 0 | 1 | 0 | 0 | 1 |
| 16 | 27 | MF | (Croatia) | Josip Mišić | 1 | 0 | 0 | 0 | 1 |
| 17 | 24 | MF | (Croatia) | Marko Tolić | 1 | 0 | 0 | 0 | 1 |
| 18 | 77 | FW | (Croatia) | Dario Špikić | 1 | 0 | 0 | 0 | 1 |
| 19 | 55 | DF | (Croatia) | Dino Perić | 1 | 0 | 0 | 0 | 1 |
| 20 | 37 | DF | (Croatia) | Josip Šutalo | 1 | 0 | 0 | 0 | 1 |
| Own goals | | | | | 0 | 0 | 0 | 0 | 0 |
| Totals | | | | | 23 | 4 | 10 | 3 | 40 |
