= Bruno Petković =

Croatian footballer

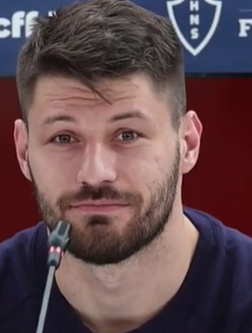
- Petković in 2022

Personal information
- Full name: Bruno Petković
- Date of birth: 16 September 1994 (age 32)
- Place of birth: Metković, Croatia
- Height: 1.93 m (6 ft 4 in)
- Position: Striker

Team information
- Current team: Kocaelispor
- Number: 9

Youth career
- 2003–2006: ONK Metković
- 2006–2007: Neretva
- 2007–2009: Dinamo Zagreb
- 2009–2010: NK Zagreb
- 2010–2011: HAŠK
- 2011–2012: Hrvatski Dragovoljac
- 2012–2013: Catania

Senior career*
Years	Team	Apps	(Gls)
2013–2016	Catania	5	(0)
2014	→ Varese (loan)	8	(1)
2015	→ Reggiana (loan)	15	(4)
2015	→ Virtus Entella (loan)	13	(1)
2016–2017	Trapani	35	(10)
2017–2019	Bologna	21	(0)
2018	→ Hellas Verona (loan)	16	(0)
2018–2019	→ Dinamo Zagreb (loan)	14	(6)
2019–2025	Dinamo Zagreb	166	(51)
2025–	Kocaelispor	18	(7)

International career^{‡}
2013	Croatia U21	1	(1)
2019–2024	Croatia	42	(11)
Medal record
Men's football
Representing Croatia
FIFA World Cup
Bronze medal – third place	2022 Qatar
UEFA Nations League
Runner-up	2023 Netherlands
- * Club domestic league appearances and goals as of 10 June 2026 ‡ National team caps and goals as of 12 October 2024

Bruno Petković (Croatian pronunciation: [brǔːno pêtkoʋitɕ]; born 16 September 1994) is a Croatian professional footballer who plays as a forward for the Turkish Süper Lig club Kocaelispor.

== Early career ==
Petković was born in Metković, Croatia. His father Jakov Petković hails from Metković and his mother Ruža Nižić is a Herzegovinian Croat from Crveni Grm near Ljubuški. His childhood football idols were Ronaldo and Zlatan Ibrahimović.

He began his youth career with his hometown clubs ONK Metković and NK Neretva, before he went to Dinamo Zagreb in 2007. He remained there until 4 September 2009, when he transferred across town to the youth academy of city rivals NK Zagreb. In the next two seasons, he represented NK HAŠK (2010–11) and Hrvatski Dragovoljac (2011–12), prior to his transfer to Italy, with Serie A side, Catania.

== Club career ==
=== Calcio Catania ===
On 27 August 2012, Petković officially transferred to Calcio Catania. The transfer fee involved was undisclosed, though Petković was inserted directly into the club's youth academy following his arrival. His first call-up to the senior squad arrived on 27 January 2013, in a 2–1 home victory over Fiorentina in league play. His league debut came on the final matchday of the 2012–13 Serie A campaign, when he appeared as an 89th-minute substitute in a 2–2 away draw with Torino. Ahead of the 2013–14 Serie A season, Petković was officially promoted to the first team, and assigned the number 32 jersey.

=== Trapani and Bologna ===
In January 2016, Petković moved to Serie B side Trapani. He scored seven goals in the second round of the Serie B season, as the Sicilian team nearly gained promotion to Serie A, failing only in the final play-off match against Pescara. The following season he scored three goals in the first round of the 2016–17 Serie B season. On 12 January 2017, Petković was purchased by Serie A team Bologna, for 1.2 million euros. He made a total of 21 Serie A appearances for the team before being loaned to Hellas Verona on 11 January 2018.

=== Dinamo Zagreb ===
==== 2018–19 season ====
On 6 August 2018, he joined Dinamo Zagreb on a season-long loan with Dinamo holding an obligation to buy his contract out at the end of the loan if certain conditions are met. On 25 August, he scored his first hat trick for Dinamo in a 3–0 home win over Lokomotiva. As the season wore on, Petković became more important to the squad and played the starring role in the peak of Dinamo Zagreb season, the 2018–19 UEFA Europa League Round of 32 home fixture against Viktoria Plzeň, when he assisted the first goal and scored the third in the 4–0 win. In the Round of 16 home fixture against Benfica he scored the only goal in the 2–0 win. However, Benfica came back beating Dinamo 3–0 at Estádio da Luz after extra time. He finished his first season in the club with 7 goals and 3 assists in 34 matches in all competitions.

==== 2019–20 season ====
Petković was instrumental to Dinamo Zagreb's successful Champions League qualifying campaign, scoring four goals against Saburtalo Tbilisi home and away, Ferencváros away, and Rosenborg home. His performances earned him a new contract with Dinamo, signed on 13 September 2019, which keeps him in the club until 2024.

He made his Champions League debut on 18 September 2019 in a 4–0 home win over Atalanta and scored his debut goal on 6 November in a 3–3 home draw with Shakhtar Donetsk.

On 17 June 2020, he scored a last minute goal in a 3–2 home victory over Slaven Belupo, the first home game of Dinamo's new manager Igor Jovićević. On 27 June, he suffered an injury in a goalless draw with Osijek that ruled him out for the rest of the season.

==== 2020–21 season ====
After missing the first Dinamo's game of the season against Lokomotiva due to the injury, Petković returned on 21 August for a game against Istra 1961, coming off the bench and scoring the only goal in the 1–0 victory. During the season, Petković was the target of criticism from the media and fans due to his inconsistency and poor form. However, on 18 February 2021, in the Europa League Round of 32, he scored a brace and provided Luka Ivanušec with a pre-assist for Iyayi Atiemwen's third goal as Dinamo defeated Krasnodar 3–2 away.

==== 2021–22 season ====
On 30 September 2021, he scored two goals from the penalty spot in a 3–0 away win over Genk in the Europa League.

==== 2022–23 season ====
On 2 November 2022, he scored a goal in a 2–1 away defeat against Chelsea in the Champions League.

== International career ==
=== Youth ===
At youth level, he was not capped as he was not good enough for Croatia U21.

=== Senior ===
Petković received his first senior Croatia call-up as a replacement for the injured Marko Livaja, for UEFA Euro 2020 qualifiers against Azerbaijan and Hungary in March 2019. On 21 March, he debuted in a 2–1 victory against the former opponent. Petković scored his first goal for the national team on 11 June in a friendly loss to Tunisia.

Petković turned out to be instrumental to Croatia's successful UEFA Euro 2020 qualifying campaign, scoring four goals and assisting one. However, following the tournament's postponement due to the COVID-19 pandemic, Petković was heavily criticized for his inefficiency in the national team during Croatia's disappointing 2020–21 Nations League campaign where they managed to win only three points in six games.

In the 2022 FIFA World Cup quarter-final on 9 December, Petković scored the equalizing goal against Brazil to take the game to penalties.

== Personal life ==
On 3 April 2021, Petković and his partner Iva Šarić became parents of a baby boy, whom they named Adrian.

Petković is an active amateur chess player and he regularly participates in humanitarian chess tournaments organised by Croatian chess grandmaster and Vice President of European Chess Union, Alojzije Janković.

Petković was an inspiration for a scene in the first episode of RTL Televizija's comedy drama show San snova, where Marko Braić's character's reaction to being interviewed by reporters was identical to that of Petković from the Zagreb Airport in 2022.

== Career statistics ==
=== Club ===
As of match played 24 January 2026

Appearances and goals by club, season and competition
Club	Season	League			National cup (Note: Includes Coppa Italia and Croatian Cup)		Europe		Other		Total	
Club	Season	Division	Apps	Goals	Apps	Goals	Apps	Goals	Apps	Goals	Apps	Goals
Catania	2012–13	Serie A	1	0	0	0	—		—		1	0
Catania	2013–14	Serie A	4	0	0	0	—		—		4	0
Catania	Total		5	0	0	0	—		—		5	0
Varese (loan)	2014–15	Serie B	8	1	1	0	—		—		9	1
Reggiana (loan)	2014–15	Lega Pro	15	4	0	0	—		3	0	18	4
Virtus Entella (loan)	2015–16	Serie B	13	1	0	0	—		—		13	1
Trapani	2015–16	Serie B	18	7	0	0	—		3 (Note: Appearances in Serie B promotion play-offs)	0	21	7
Trapani	2016–17	Serie B	17	3	0	0	—		—		17	3
Trapani	Total		71	16	0	0	—		3	0	78	16
Bologna	2016–17	Serie A	12	0	0	0	—		—		12	0
Bologna	2017–18	Serie A	9	0	1	0	—		—		10	0
Bologna	Total		21	0	1	0	—		—		22	0
Hellas Verona (loan)	2017–18	Serie A	16	0	0	0	—		—		16	0
Dinamo Zagreb	2018–19 (Note: Part of this season was spent on loan from Bologna)	Prva HNL	25	9	5	1	9 (Note: Appearances in UEFA Europa League)	2	—		39	12
Dinamo Zagreb	2019–20	Prva HNL	25	7	2	1	12 (Note: Appearances in UEFA Champions League)	5	1 (Note: Appearance in Croatian Super Cup)	0	40	13
Dinamo Zagreb	2020–21	Prva HNL	25	9	4	1	13 (Note: Two appearances in UEFA Champions League, eleven appearances and four goals in UEFA Europa League)	4	0	0	42	14
Dinamo Zagreb	2021–22	Prva HNL	30	7	1	0	14 (Note: Seven appearances and one goal in UEFA Champions League, seven appearances and three goals in UEFA Europa League)	4	—		45	11
Dinamo Zagreb	2022–23	HNL	28	10	2	0	12	4	1	0	43	14
Dinamo Zagreb	2023–24	HNL	27	11	3	0	13 (Note: Four appearances in UEFA Champions League, two appearances in UEFA Europa League, seven appearances and seven goals in UEFA Europa Conference League)	7	1	0	44	18
Dinamo Zagreb	2024–25	HNL	20	4	1	0	5	2	—		26	6
Dinamo Zagreb	Total		196	57	18	3	78	28	3	0	295	88
Kocaelispor	2025–26	Süper Lig	13	6	2	0	—		—		15	6
Career total			306	79	22	3	78	28	9	0	415	110

=== International ===
As of match played 12 October 2024

Appearances and goals by national team and year
National team	Year	Apps	Goals
Croatia	2019	8	5
Croatia	2020	5	1
Croatia	2021	8	0
Croatia	2022	8	1
Croatia	2023	5	3
Croatia	2024	8	1
Total		42	11

Scores and results list Croatia's goal tally first, score column indicates score after each Petković goal.

List of international goals scored by Bruno Petković
No.	Date	Venue	Cap	Opponent	Score	Result	Competition
1	11 June 2019	Stadion Varteks, Varaždin, Croatia	3	Tunisia	1–1	1–2	Friendly
2	6 September 2019	Anton Malatinský Stadium, Trnava, Slovakia	4	Slovakia	3–0	4–0	UEFA Euro 2020 qualifying
3	10 October 2019	Stadion Poljud, Split, Croatia	6	Hungary	2–0	3–0	UEFA Euro 2020 qualifying
4	10 October 2019	Stadion Poljud, Split, Croatia	6	Hungary	3–0	3–0	UEFA Euro 2020 qualifying
5	16 November 2019	Stadion Rujevica, Rijeka, Croatia	8	Slovakia	2–1	3–1	UEFA Euro 2020 qualifying
6	5 September 2020	Estádio do Dragão, Porto, Portugal	9	Portugal	1–3	1–4	2020–21 UEFA Nations League A
7	9 December 2022	Education City Stadium, Al Rayyan, Qatar	27	Brazil	1–1	1–1 (a.e.t.)	2022 FIFA World Cup
8	14 June 2023	De Kuip, Rotterdam, Netherlands	30	Netherlands	3–2	4–2 (a.e.t.)	2023 UEFA Nations League Finals
9	8 September 2023	Stadion Rujevica, Rijeka, Croatia	32	Latvia	1–0	5–0	UEFA Euro 2024 qualifying
10	8 September 2023	Stadion Rujevica, Rijeka, Croatia	32	Latvia	3–0	5–0	UEFA Euro 2024 qualifying
11	27 March 2024	New Administrative Capital Stadium, New Administrative Capital, Egypt	36	Egypt	2–1	4–2	2024 FIFA Series

== Honours ==
Dinamo Zagreb

- HNL: 2018–19, 2019–20, 2020–21, 2021–22, 2022–23, 2023–24
- Croatian Cup: 2020–21, 2023–24
- Croatian Super Cup: 2019, 2022, 2023

Croatia

- FIFA World Cup third place: 2022
- UEFA Nations League runner-up: 2022–23

Individual

- Football Oscar – Best Prva HNL player: 2020, 2021
- Football Oscar – Prva HNL Team of the Year: 2019, 2020, 2021
- Tportal Prva HNL Player of the Year: 2019
- Croatian First Football League top assist provided: 2019–20, 2020–21
- CIES Croatian First Football League Team of the Season: 2021–22
- Croatian Football League Player of the Year: 2023–24
- Croatian Football League Team of the Year: 2023–24
- UEFA Nations League Finals Goal of the Tournament: 2023
