= Arijan Ademi =

Macedonian footballer

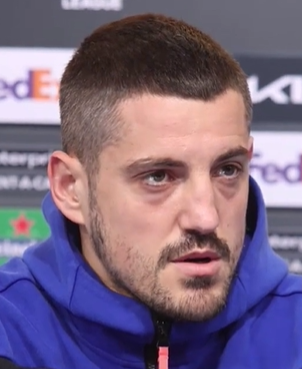
- Ademi with Dinamo Zagreb in 2021

Personal information
- Full name: Arijan Ademi
- Date of birth: 29 May 1991 (age 35)
- Place of birth: Šibenik, SR Croatia, Yugoslavia
- Height: 1.84 m (6 ft 0 in)
- Position: Defensive midfielder

Team information
- Current team: Újpest
- Number: 8

Senior career*
Years	Team	Apps	(Gls)
2007–2010	Šibenik	56	(2)
2010–2023	Dinamo Zagreb	230	(22)
2011–2012	→ Lokomotiva (loan)	3	(0)
2023	Beijing Guoan	19	(2)
2023–2025	Dinamo Zagreb	44	(4)
2025–	Újpest	17	(0)

International career^{‡}
2008–2009	Croatia U18	4	(1)
2008–2010	Croatia U19	17	(2)
2010–2011	Croatia U20	3	(0)
2010–2012	Croatia U21	9	(1)
2013–2014	Croatia	3	(0)
2014–2023	North Macedonia	33	(4)
Medal record
Men's football
Representing Croatia
UEFA European Under-19 Championship
Bronze medal – third place	2010 France
- * Club domestic league appearances and goals as of 30 May 2026 ‡ National team caps and goals as of 19:10, 9 October 2022 (UTC)

Arijan Ademi (Macedonian: Аријан Адеми; born 29 May 1991) is a professional footballer who plays for Hungarian Football League club Újpest.

Ademi started his professional career at Šibenik, debuting for the senior squad on 22 March 2008, aged just 16 years. On 16 June 2010, he was transferred to reigning Croatian champions Dinamo Zagreb, becoming the team captain in 2017. Through fourteen seasons at the club, Ademi became the most decorated player in club's history, having won 24 trophies.

Born in Croatia to Macedonian Albanian parents, Ademi represented his country of birth at various youth levels. Despite even making three appearances for the senior team, on 9 October 2014, he debuted for the Macedonia national team in an official match. He was selected to represent North Macedonia at UEFA Euro 2020.

In 2015, Ademi initially received a four-year suspension for doping, which was subsequently reduced to two years.

== Club career ==
=== Šibenik ===
Ademi began his career at Šibenik where he was promoted to the first team on 15 September 2007. He made his first senior appearance for the club on 22 March 2008 in a match against Dinamo Zagreb. He featured as a 63rd-minute substitute for Gabriel in a match Šibenik lost 5–1. The following season Ademi made 28 appearances for the senior squad, 16 of which he started in the first eleven. The 2009–10 Prva HNL was the most successful for Ademi as he made 27 appearances in the first eleven and scored two goals. He scored his first league goal on 25 July 2009 in an away match against Croatia Sesvete which Šibenik won 2–1. He was also the youngest player that captained any Prva HNL club that season.

=== Dinamo Zagreb ===
On 16 June 2010 he was transferred to Dinamo Zagreb for a fee of €400,000. He made his first appearance for his new club on 31 July 2010 in a league match against Rijeka in a match Dinamo Zagreb lost 2–1. He also made his debut in European competitions on 4 August in the 2010–11 UEFA Champions League third qualifying round match against Sheriff Tiraspol which finished with a draw 1–1. Upon arrival of the coach Vahid Halilhodžić he established himself as a first team regular in the position of defensive midfielder, and appeared as a starter in their 2010–11 UEFA Europa League group matches, as Dinamo finished third with 7 points, behind Villarreal and PAOK. By the end of the season he has won his first trophies with Dinamo, Prva HNL and Croatian Cup.

After losing his first team spot, in the second part of the 2011–12 season he was sent on loan to Lokomotiva, where he made only three appearances due to injury.

He came back from loan at the beginning of the 2012–13 season, and was a part of the squad that qualified for the 2012–13 UEFA Champions League. In the CL group stage, Ademi made 5 appearances, as Dinamo finished bottom of their group with one point.

On 7 October 2015, Dinamo Zagreb announced that Ademi failed a doping test after their recent Champions League win over Arsenal in September. UEFA subsequently suspended Ademi for a period of four years. On 27 March 2017, the suspension was reduced by two years as Ademi managed to prove that he hadn't taken doping intentionally, making him eligible for selection from October 2017. In November 2017, Ademi was named the club captain, after coach Mario Cvitanović stripped Domagoj Antolić of captaincy.

In summer 2020, upon winning Prva HNL, Ademi became the most decorated player in Dinamo's history, having won 17 trophies. On 3 December 2020, he broke Sammir's record for most appearances for Dinamo in European competitions, making his 77th appearance in the 2–0 Europa League victory over Feyenoord at De Kuip.

=== Beijing Guoan ===
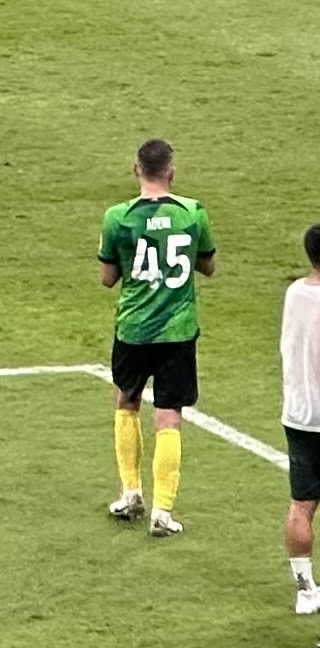
Arijan Ademi playing for Beijing Guoan in July 2023

In March 2023, it was confirmed that Ademi would be leaving Dinamo after 13 years to join Chinese Super League club Beijing Guoan. He played his final match for Dinamo on 19 March against Rijeka.

Ademi scored his first goal for Guoan in his 7th game for the club against Nantong Zhiyun on 15 May 2023.

=== Return to Dinamo Zagreb ===
On 8 September 2023, Ademi rejoined Dinamo Zagreb.

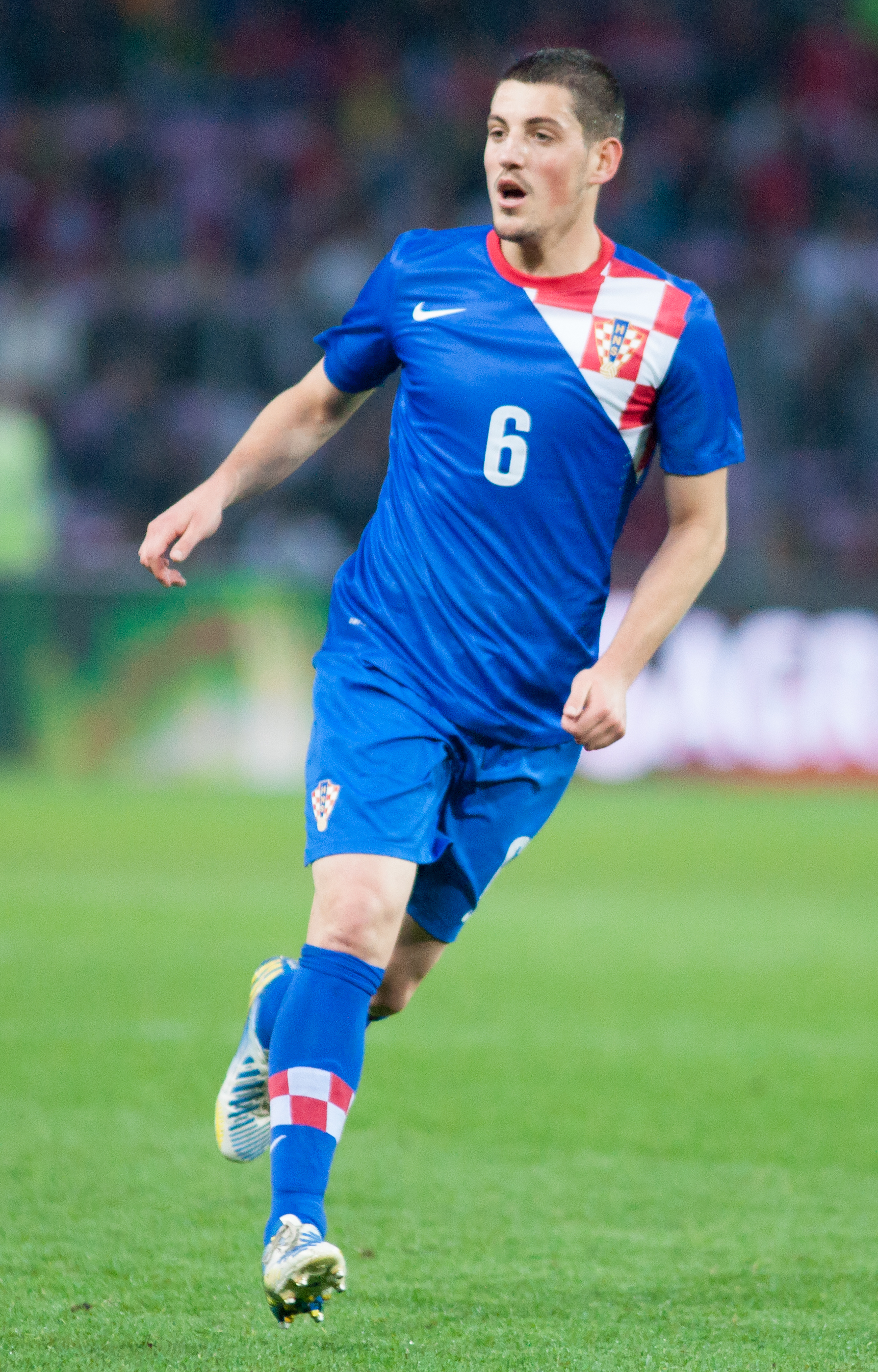
Ademi playing for Croatia in 2013

== International career ==
=== Croatia ===
Ademi made his first international appearance for Croatia playing for the under-19 football team. His debut international cap came in a friendly match against Slovenia under-19 selection in Bistra, on 12 August 2008. Croatia won the match 3–1 and Ademi played until 69th minute when he was substituted by Renato Kelić. He made another appearance the next day when two selections faced each other in Brežice. The match finished with another win by Croatian under-19 team and Ademi played full 90 minutes in that match. He scored his first international goal on 17 September in a friendly match against Bosnia and Herzegovina under-19 team in Županja. The match finished with a 2–2 draw. His first official match for under-19 team came on 5 October 2008 when the team faced Estonia in Tallinn in their 2009 UEFA under-19 football championship. Estonia won the match 4–1 with Ademi playing the full match for Croatian side. He made another appearance against Kazakhstan on 7 October 2008 in a match Croatia won 4–0. After that, Ademi was capped four times in friendly matches for the under-18 team between 10 March and 2 April 2009. He also scored a goal against Bosnia and Herzegovina under-18 team on 31 March in a home match Croatia won 3–0. Ademi returned to under-19 team on 15 September 2009 featuring in the friendly match against Slovenia. After that, he made four more official appearances for the under-19 team in their 2010 UEFA under-19 football championship qualifying campaign. On 22 January 2013 national team head coach Igor Štimac called up Ademi for a friendly match against South Korea in London on 6 February 2013. Earlier, in February 2013, Ademi had complained to the Albanian media that Albania never extended him an invitation.

=== North Macedonia ===
After Niko Kovač did not select Ademi for the 2014 FIFA World Cup squad, Ademi decided to play for Macedonia. Kovač later changed his mind and tried to call him up after the tournament but Ademi refused as he had already given his word to the Football Federation of Macedonia and didn't want to break the besa. On 9 October 2014, he made his official debut in a UEFA Euro 2016 qualifying match against Luxembourg.

On 8 October and 12 November 2020, Ademi took part in North Macedonia's 2–1 and 1–0 victories over Kosovo and Georgia in the UEFA Euro 2020 play-offs, despite being injured both times, helping North Macedonia reach their first major tournament in history. On 31 March 2021, in the 2022 FIFA World Cup qualifier against Germany in Duisburg, Ademi provided Eljif Elmas with an assist for the winning goal in the 2–1 victory. It was Germany's first defeat in the FIFA World Cup qualification since 1 September 2001 and the third ever.

On 8 March 2024, national team coach Blagoja Milevski confirmed that Ademi retired from national team.

== Personal life ==
Ademi was born in Šibenik to an ethnic Albanian family who hail from Pirok, North Macedonia. His great-grandfather moved from Pirok to Šibenik after World War I, where his grandfather Afet opened a pastry shop that is still working. He is a cousin of Macedonian professional football player Agim Ibraimi.

In April 2020, Ademi's girlfriend Andrea Janković, daughter of Janko Janković, gave birth in Zagreb to their first child, a baby boy they named Adrian. In September 2022, Ademi and Janković had their second son.

== Career statistics ==
=== Club ===
As of 23 April 2025

Club	Season	League			National Cup		Continental		Other		Total	
Club	Season	Division	Apps	Goals	Apps	Goals	Apps	Goals	Apps	Goals	Apps	Goals
Šibenik	2007–08	Prva HNL	1	0	—		—		—		1	0
Šibenik	2008–09	Prva HNL	28	0	1	0	—		—		29	0
Šibenik	2009–10	Prva HNL	27	2	7	0	—		—		34	2
Šibenik	Total		56	2	8	0	—		—		64	2
Dinamo Zagreb	2010–11	Prva HNL	21	0	7	0	8	0	—		36	0
Dinamo Zagreb	2011–12	Prva HNL	5	0	1	1	2 (Note: Appearances in UEFA Champions League)	0	—		8	1
Dinamo Zagreb	2012–13	Prva HNL	24	3	2	0	8	0	—		34	3
Dinamo Zagreb	2013–14	Prva HNL	24	1	7	2	11	1	1 (Note: Appearance in Croatian Super Cup)	0	43	4
Dinamo Zagreb	2014–15	Prva HNL	26	3	4	0	11	1	1	0	42	4
Dinamo Zagreb	2015–16	Prva HNL	8	0	—		5	1	—		13	1
Dinamo Zagreb	2016–17	Prva HNL	—		—		—		—		—	
Dinamo Zagreb	2017–18	Prva HNL	22	2	3	1	—		—		25	3
Dinamo Zagreb	2018–19	Prva HNL	15	2	4	0	12	2	—		31	4
Dinamo Zagreb	2019–20	Prva HNL	19	3	1	0	12	2	1	0	33	5
Dinamo Zagreb	2020–21	Prva HNL	27	1	3	3	15	2	0	0	45	6
Dinamo Zagreb	2021–22	Prva HNL	20	3	2	0	8	2	0	0	30	5
Dinamo Zagreb	2022–23	Prva HNL	19	4	1	0	6	2	0	0	30	6
Dinamo Zagreb	Total		230	22	38	7	98	13	3	0	370	42
Lokomotiva (loan)	2011–12	Prva HNL	3	0	—		—		—		3	0
Beijing Guoan	2023	Chinese Super League	19	2	1	0	—		—		20	2
Dinamo Zagreb	2023–24	Prva HNL	27	2	4	0	0	0	0	0	31	2
Dinamo Zagreb	2024–25	Prva HNL	17	2	2	1	6	0	0	0	25	3
Dinamo Zagreb	Total		44	4	6	1	6	0	0	0	56	5
Career total			352	30	50	8	104	13	3	0	513	51

=== International ===
As of match played 17 November 2023

National team	Year	Apps	Goals
Croatia	2013	3	0
Total		3	0
Macedonia	2014	3	0
Macedonia	2015	1	1
Macedonia	2016	0	0
Macedonia	2017	1	1
Macedonia	2018	4	0
North; Macedonia	2019	5	1
North; Macedonia	2020	4	0
North; Macedonia	2021	8	1
North; Macedonia	2022	2	0
North; Macedonia	2023	5	0
Total		33	4

==== International goals ====
North Macedonia score listed first, score column indicates score after each Ademi goal.

International goals by date, venue, cap, opponent, score, result and competition
No.	Date	Venue	Cap	Opponent	Score	Result	Competition
1	14 June 2015	Štadión pod Dubňom, Žilina, Slovakia	4	Slovakia	1–2	1–2	UEFA Euro 2016 qualifying
2	9 October 2017	Stadion Mladost, Strumica, Macedonia	5	Liechtenstein	4–0	4–0	2018 FIFA World Cup qualification
3	5 September 2019	Turner Stadium, Be'er Sheva, Israel	12	Israel	1–1	1–1	UEFA Euro 2020 qualifying
4	25 March 2021	Arena Națională, Bucharest, Romania	19	Romania	1–2	2–3	2022 FIFA World Cup qualification

== Honours ==
=== Club ===
Šibenik

- Croatian Cup runner-up: 2009–10

Dinamo Zagreb

- Prva HNL : 2010–11, 2011–12, 2012–13, 2013–14, 2014–15, 2015–16, 2017–18, 2018–19, 2019–20, 2020–21, 2021–22, 2022–23, 2023–24
- Croatian Cup : 2010–11, 2011–12, 2014–15, 2015–16, 2017–18, 2020–21, 2023–24
- Croatian Super Cup: 2010, 2013, 2019, 2022

=== Individual ===
- UEFA European Under-19 Championship Team of the Tournament: 2010
- Football Oscar Team of the Year: 2015, 2018, 2020, 2021, 2022
- Prva HNL Player of the Year (Tportal): 2020
- 24sata Team of the Season: 2020–21
- GNK Dinamo Zagreb Player of the Half-Season: 2021–22
