= Deni Jurić =

Australian soccer player

Personal information
- Date of birth: 3 September 1997 (age 29)
- Place of birth: Kogarah, Australia
- Height: 1.88 m (6 ft 2 in)
- Position: Forward

Team information
- Current team: Wisła Płock
- Number: 9

Youth career
- 2009–2011: Croatia Sesvete
- 2011–2012: Sesvete
- 2012–2013: Croatia Prigorje Sesvete
- 2013–2016: Sesvete

Senior career*
Years	Team	Apps	(Gls)
2015–2016	Sesvete	2	(0)
2016–2018	Hajduk Split II	32	(15)
2017	→ Solin (loan)	12	(3)
2018	Triglav Kranj	7	(0)
2019	Solin	13	(3)
2019–2020	Rudeš	17	(10)
2020–2021	Šibenik	32	(11)
2021–2024	Dinamo Zagreb	12	(1)
2021	→ Šibenik (loan)	4	(0)
2022	→ Gorica (loan)	12	(1)
2022–2023	→ Rijeka (loan)	6	(0)
2024	→ Koper (loan)	6	(2)
2024–2025	Koper	25	(16)
2025–	Wisła Płock	19	(5)

International career^{‡}
2015	Croatia U19	4	(0)
2017–2018	Australia U23	4	(0)
2026–	Australia	2	(0)
- * Club domestic league appearances and goals as of 18:07, 29 May 2026 (UTC) ‡ National team caps and goals as of 11:45, 31 March 2026 (UTC)

Deni Jurić (born 3 September 1997) is an Australian professional soccer player who plays as a forward for Polish club Wisła Płock and the Australia national team. He is the younger brother of Australian international Tomi Juric.

== Club career ==
Although born in Australia, Deni grew up playing his early career in Croatia, partly due to his Croatian origin, which began with the Sesvete club. He later joined the youth team of Hajduk Split for a season as well as playing in Slovenia for Triglav Kranj. He later wandered through Croatian clubs in the second division, Solin and Rudeš before moving to top-flight once more, joining for Šibenik where he played alongside another fellow Croatian Australian Doni Grdić.

=== Dinamo Zagreb ===
In 2021, he was signed by Dinamo Zagreb, making him the first-ever Australian soccer player since Mark Viduka, also another famous Croatian Australian, to play for the club. He was also loaned to his former club Šibenik, representing the team in only four matches.

== International career ==
Deni had played for both Croatian and Australian youth levels, as he carries the nationalities of both countries. In 2021, he has expressed interest in representing Croatia, although he remains open to the potential opportunity to represent Australia; he is also available to represent Bosnia and Herzegovina due to his parents are Bosnian Croats.

== Career statistics ==
=== Club ===
As of match played 16 May 2026

Appearances and goals by club, season and competition
Club	Season	League			National cup (Note: Includes Slovenian Cup, Croatian Cup)		Other		Total	
Club	Season	Division	Apps	Goals	Apps	Goals	Apps	Goals	Apps	Goals
Sesvete	2015–16	Druga HNL	2	0	0	0	0	0	2	0
Hajduk Split II	2016–17	Treća HNL South	25	15	0	0	0	0	25	15
Hajduk Split II	2017–18	Druga HNL	7	0	0	0	0	0	7	0
Hajduk Split II	Total		32	15	0	0	0	0	32	15
Solin (loan)	2017–18	Druga HNL	12	3	0	0	0	0	12	3
Triglav Kranj	2018–19	Slovenian PrvaLiga	7	0	1	0	0	0	8	0
Solin	2018–19	Druga HNL	13	3	0	0	0	0	13	3
Rudeš	2019–20	Druga HNL	17	10	0	0	0	0	17	10
Šibenik	2020–21	1. HNL	32	11	1	0	0	0	33	11
Dinamo Zagreb	2021–22	1. HNL	11	1	1	1	4 (Note: One appearance in UEFA Champions League, three appearances in UEFA Europa League)	0	16	2
Dinamo Zagreb	2023–24	Croatian Football League	1	0	0	0	0	0	1	0
Dinamo Zagreb	Total		12	1	1	1	4	0	17	2
Šibenik (loan)	2021–22	1. HNL	4	0	—		—		4	0
Gorica (loan)	2022–23	Croatian Football League	12	1	2	0	—		14	1
Rijeka (loan)	2022–23	Croatian Football League	6	0	—		—		6	0
Koper (loan)	2023–24	Slovenian PrvaLiga	6	2	—		—		6	2
Koper	2024–25	Slovenian PrvaLiga	20	11	3	0	—		23	11
Koper	2025–26	Slovenian PrvaLiga	5	5	—		4 (Note: Appearances in UEFA Conference League)	2	9	7
Koper	Total		31	18	3	0	4	2	38	20
Wisła Płock	2025–26	Ekstraklasa	19	5	0	0	—		19	5
Career total			199	67	8	1	8	2	215	70

=== International ===
As of match played 31 March 2026

Appearances and goals by national team and year
National team	Year	Apps	Goals
Australia
Australia	2026	2	0
Total		2	0

== Honours ==
Dinamo Zagreb

- Croatian First Football League: 2021–22
