= Tin Hrvoj =

Croatian footballer (born 2001)

Personal information
- Date of birth: 6 June 2001 (age 25)
- Place of birth: Zagreb, Croatia
- Height: 1.80 m (5 ft 11 in)
- Position: Right-back

Team information
- Current team: Auda
- Number: 2

Youth career
- 2007–2010: Radoboj
- 2011–2013: Hrvatski Dragovoljac
- 2013–2020: Dinamo Zagreb

Senior career*
Years	Team	Apps	(Gls)
2019–2022	Dinamo Zagreb II	46	(0)
2020–2022	Dinamo Zagreb	2	(0)
2020	→ Varaždin (loan)	0	(0)
2020–2021	→ Hrvatski Dragovoljac (loan)	3	(0)
2022–2024	Radomlje	64	(0)
2024–	Auda	67	(1)

International career
2015	Croatia U14	2	(0)
2016	Croatia U15	3	(0)
2016	Croatia U16	3	(0)
2016–2018	Croatia U17	16	(0)
2018	Croatia U18	3	(0)
2019	Croatia U19	5	(0)
2021–2022	Croatia U20	3	(0)
- * Club domestic league appearances and goals as of 12 November 2026

Tin Hrvoj (born 6 June 2001) is a Croatian footballer who plays as a right-back for Latvian club Auda.

== Career statistics ==
=== Club ===
As of 2 July 2020.

Appearances and goals by club, season and competition
Club	Season	League			National cup		Continental		Other		Total	
Club	Season	Division	Apps	Goals	Apps	Goals	Apps	Goals	Apps	Goals	Apps	Goals
Dinamo Zagreb II	2019–20	2. HNL	7	0	—		—		0	0	7	0
Dinamo Zagreb	2019–20	1. HNL	1	0	0	0	0	0	0	0	1	0
Career total			8	0	0	0	0	0	0	0	8	0
