= Dominik Livaković =

Croatian goalkeeper (born 1995)

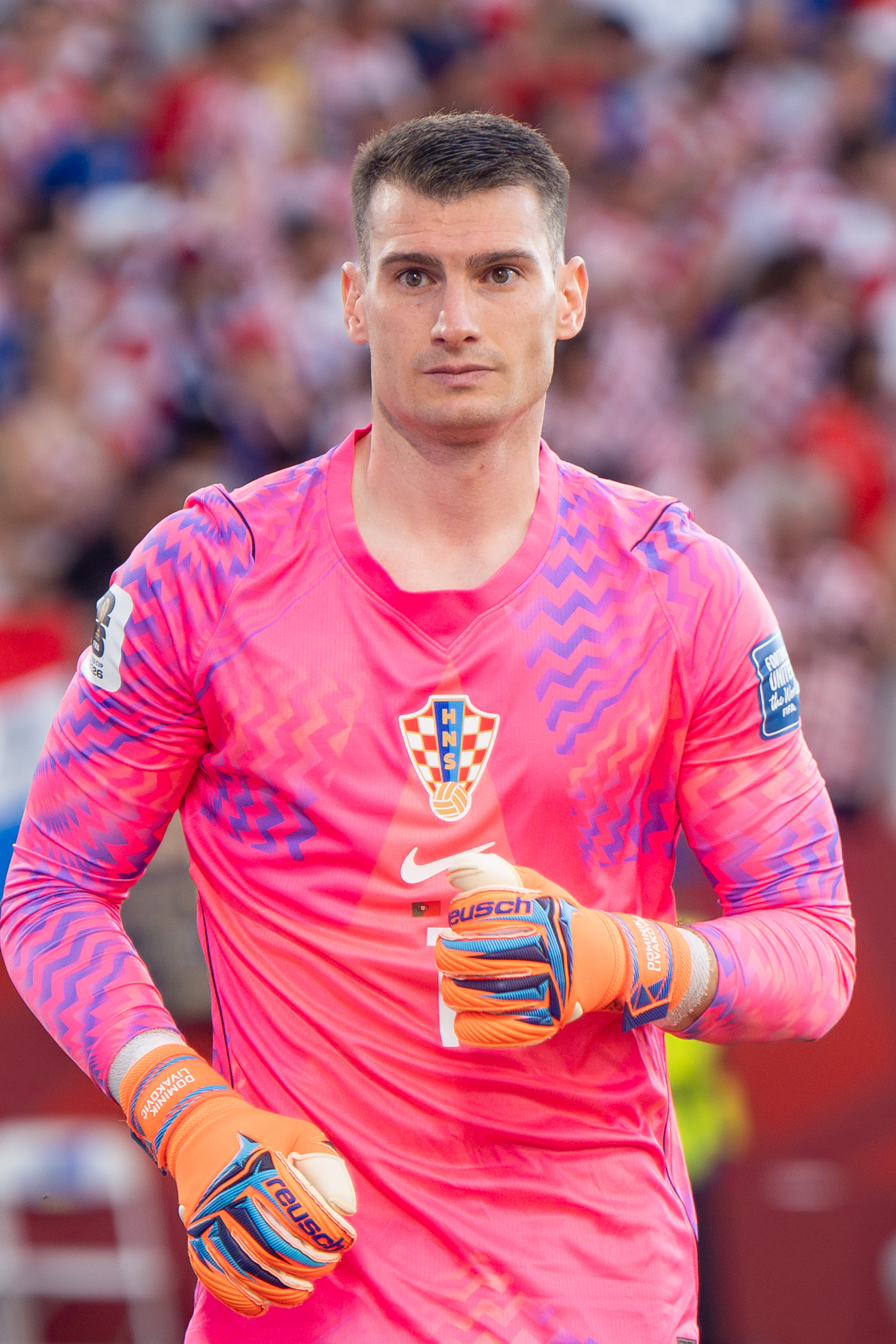
- Livaković with Croatia in 2026 FIFA World Cup

Personal information
- Full name: Dominik Livaković
- Date of birth: 9 January 1995 (age 31)
- Place of birth: Zadar, Croatia
- Height: 1.88 m (6 ft 2 in)
- Position: Goalkeeper

Team information
- Current team: Barcelona
- Number: 25

Youth career
- 2007–2012: NK Zadar
- 2012–2014: NK Zagreb

Senior career*
Years	Team	Apps	(Gls)
2012–2016	NK Zagreb	104	(0)
2016–2023	Dinamo Zagreb	207	(0)
2023–2026	Fenerbahçe	57	(0)
2025–2026	→ Girona (loan)	0	(0)
2026	→ Dinamo Zagreb (loan)	14	(0)
2026–	Barcelona	1	(0)

International career^{‡}
2010	Croatia U15	3	(0)
2011	Croatia U16	3	(0)
2011	Croatia U17	6	(0)
2013–2014	Croatia U19	6	(0)
2013	Croatia U20	1	(0)
2014–2016	Croatia U21	15	(0)
2017–	Croatia	85	(0)
Medal record
Men's football
Representing Croatia
FIFA World Cup
Runner-up	2018 Russia
Third place	2022 Qatar
UEFA Nations League
Runner-up	2023 Netherlands
- * Club domestic league appearances and goals as of 11:09, 27 August 2026 (UTC) ‡ National team caps and goals as of 23:23, 15 November 2026 (UTC)

Dominik Livaković (Croatian pronunciation: [dôminik liʋǎːkoʋitɕ, domǐ-]; born 9 January 1995) is a Croatian professional footballer who plays as a goalkeeper for La Liga club Barcelona and the Croatia national team. Livaković has spent the bulk of his career with NK Zagreb, being the club's youth product, and with Dinamo Zagreb.

Internationally, Livaković has represented Croatia since 2017, a product of their youth academy. He won back-to-back World Cup medals, coming in second at the 2018 FIFA World Cup and third in the 2022 FIFA World Cup. He holds a variety of international records, including for the most World Cup appearances by a Croatian goalkeeper (10).

== Club career ==
=== NK Zagreb ===
Livaković became part of NK Zagreb's first team at the beginning of the 2012–13 season. Initially the club's second-choice goalkeeper, he made his league debut on 31 August 2012, playing the full match in a 1–0 defeat at home to HNK Cibalia. He soon became the club's number one and made a total of 104 league appearances over four seasons, including 90 in the Prva HNL.

=== Dinamo Zagreb ===
On 30 August 2015, he agreed to join Dinamo Zagreb at the beginning of the 2016–17 season. He made his league debut for the club on 2 October 2016 in a goalless draw at home to Hajduk Split. On 18 October 2016, he made his first appearance in the UEFA Champions League in a 1–0 defeat at home to Sevilla.

On 30 July 2019, in a Champions League qualifying 3–0 victory over Saburtalo Tbilisi, Livaković broke Dražen Ladić's record for most minutes from the start of Dinamo's season without conceding a goal (413), set in 1995. He conceded his first goal of the season three days later, in a 3–1 league victory over Gorica, set the new record at 535.

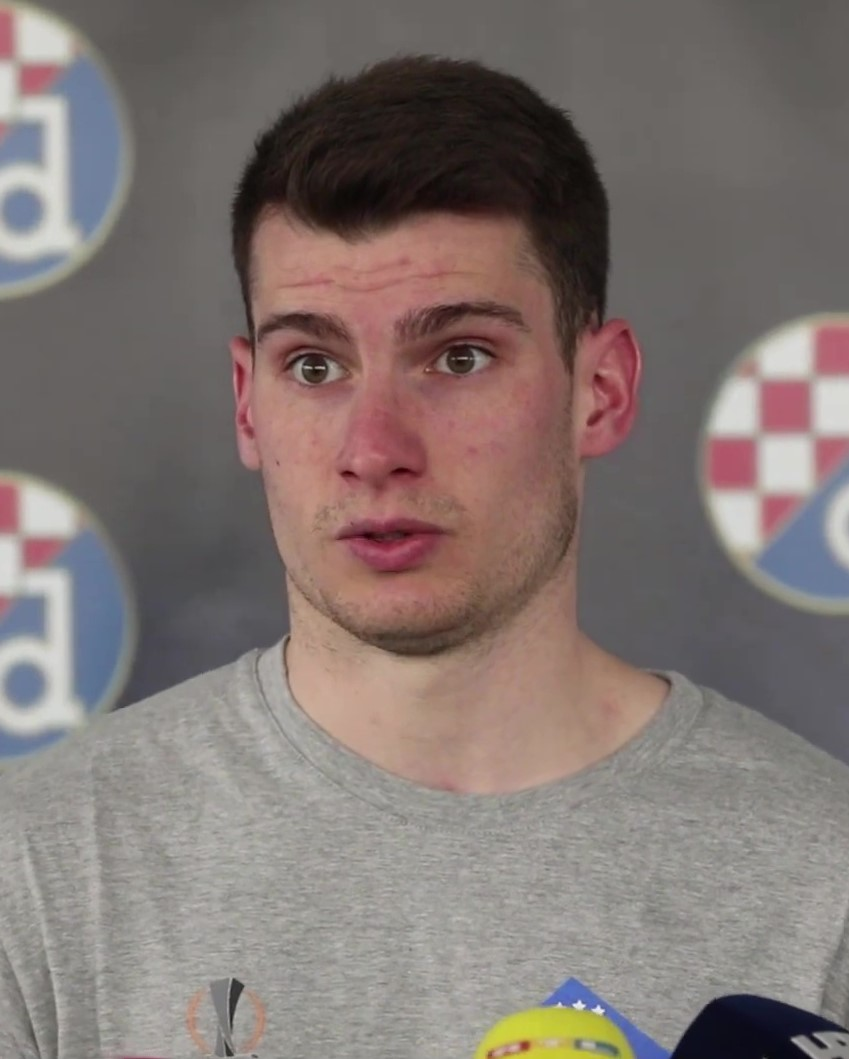
Livaković with Dinamo Zagreb in 2021

On 26 August 2020, in a Champions League qualifier against CFR Cluj, Livaković saved Ciprian Deac's penalty kick. The game went to extra time and ended as a 2–2 draw, resulting in a penalty shoot-out. Livaković saved Cătălin Golofca's attempt which would turn out crucial as Dinamo won the shootout 6–5 and progressed to the third qualifying round. In the 2020–21 Europa League group stage, Livaković was praised for his performances after he conceded only one goal in five games and led Dinamo to the first place in their group. He notably saved Steven Berghuis's penalty kick in Dinamo's 0–0 draw with Feyenoord on 22 October. On 18 March 2021, in the Europa League Round of 16 against Tottenham Hotspur, Livaković saved Harry Kane's close-range effort when the score was 3–0 for Dinamo, leading the club to a 3–2 aggregate victory and the first Europa League quarter-final in its history.

=== Fenerbahçe ===
On 25 August 2023, Livaković joined Süper Lig club Fenerbahçe on a €6.65 million fee, signing a 5-year contract. On 6 September, he was announced as one of the nominees for the 2023 Yashin Trophy.

On 17 September 2023, he made his Süper Lig debut against Antalyaspor in a 3–2 home win in Şükrü Saraçoğlu Stadium. On 21 September 2023, he made his continental debut with the team against Nordsjaelland in a 3–1 win, UEFA Conference League home match.

On 26 September 2024, he saved his compatriot Franjo Ivanović's 90+2 minutes penalty kick against Union Saint-Gilloise in a 2–1 win, UEFA Europa League home match.

==== Loan to Girona ====
On 1 September 2025, Livaković joined La Liga club Girona on loan for the remainder of the 2025–26 season. However, Girona's coach Míchel later publicly criticized Livaković's commitment to the club, stating that he refused to play in the Copa del Rey against Ourense CF in place of the fever-ridden goalkeeper Paulo Gazzaniga, as he was aiming to join another team, having already featured for Fenerbahçe earlier in the season, and focus on preparing for the World Cup. As a result, Míchel confirmed that Livaković would not feature for the team.

==== Return to Dinamo Zagreb ====
On 30 January 2026, Livaković rejoined his former club Dinamo Zagreb on loan.

=== Barcelona ===
On 27 August 2026, Livaković joined La Liga club Barcelona on a four-year contract for an initial transfer fee worth €2 million, with a further €2 million in add-ons.

On 19 September, Livaković made his debut for Barça, starting in a 3-1 away win against Sevilla after main goalkeeper Joan Garcia sustained an injury three days before in a 7-2 home win against Racing Santander.

== International career ==
Livakovic playing for Croatia at the 2026 FIFA World Cup

Livaković received his first call-up to the Croatia national football team for their friendly match against Moldova in May 2016. He debuted against Chile in the 2017 China Cup where Croatia lost on penalties.

In May 2018 Livaković was named to Croatia's preliminary 32-man squad for the 2018 FIFA World Cup in Russia, and was eventually part of the team that finished runners-up after losing the final against France. He made his competitive debut against England in the 2018–19 Nations League match held on 12 October 2018 at Stadion Rujevica in Rijeka, which ended in a goalless draw.

On 5 December 2022, in the 2022 FIFA World Cup round of 16 match against Japan, Livaković was named Man of the Match after saving three penalties in the shoot-out to help his side advance to the quarter-finals. In said quarter-finals, he saved another penalty in the shoot-out against Brazil, helping Croatia advance to the semi-finals. He produced eleven saves, with the performance earning him another Man of the Match award, as well as the rare 10/10 rating from L'Équipe, making him the 15th player in the magazine's history to be awarded it. Despite being one of the favorites for the Golden Glove award, he lost it to Emiliano Martínez.

In May 2026, Livaković was named to the Croatia national team squad for the 2026 FIFA World Cup.

== Personal life ==
Livaković hails from a prominent family. His father Zdravko Livaković is a construction engineer and a former State Secretary in the Ministry of the Sea, Transport and Infrastructure during the mandate of Božidar Kalmeta. His paternal grandfather and grandmother were a radiologist and an English teacher, respectively. His mother Manuela Skoblar is Josip Skoblar's first cousin once removed.

In June 2022, Livaković married his long-time girlfriend Helena Matić in the Zadar Cathedral.

He credited Danijel Subašić, David de Gea, and Iker Casillas as his football role models.

== Career statistics ==
=== Club ===
As of match played 19 September 2026

Appearances and goals by club, season and competition
Club	Season	League			National cup (Note: Includes Croatian Cup, Turkish Cup, Copa del Rey)		Europe		Other		Total	
Club	Season	Division	Apps	Goals	Apps	Goals	Apps	Goals	Apps	Goals	Apps	Goals
Zagreb	2012–13	Prva HNL	23	0	1	0	—		—		24	0
Zagreb	2013–14	Druga HNL	14	0	—		—		—		14	0
Zagreb	2014–15	Prva HNL	35	0	1	0	—		—		36	0
Zagreb	2015–16	Prva HNL	32	0	3	0	—		—		35	0
Zagreb	Total		104	0	5	0	—		—		109	0
Dinamo Zagreb	2016–17	Prva HNL	22	0	1	0	4 (Note: Appearances in UEFA Champions League)	0	—		27	0
Dinamo Zagreb	2017–18	Prva HNL	33	0	0	0	4 (Note: Appearances in UEFA Europa League)	0	—		37	0
Dinamo Zagreb	2018–19	Prva HNL	21	0	3	0	10	0	—		34	0
Dinamo Zagreb	2019–20	Prva HNL	26	0	1	0	12	0	1 (Note: Appearance in Croatian Super Cup)	0	40	0
Dinamo Zagreb	2020–21	Prva HNL	33	0	1	0	14 (Note: Two appearances in UEFA Champions League, twelve appearances in UEFA Europa League)	0	—		48	0
Dinamo Zagreb	2021–22	Prva HNL	34	0	1	0	14 (Note: Six appearances in UEFA Champions League, eight appearances in UEFA Europa League)	0	—		49	0
Dinamo Zagreb	2022–23	HNL	35	0	2	0	12	0	—		49	0
Dinamo Zagreb	2023–24	HNL	3	0	—		4	0	1	0	8	0
Dinamo Zagreb	Total		207	0	9	0	74	0	2	0	293	0
Fenerbahçe	2023–24	Süper Lig	34	0	0	0	6 (Note: Appearances in UEFA Europa Conference League)	0	0	0	40	0
Fenerbahçe	2024–25	Süper Lig	22	0	0	0	10 (Note: Four appearances in UEFA Champions League, six appearances in UEFA Europa League)	0	—		32	0
Fenerbahçe	2025–26	Süper Lig	1	0	—		1	0	—		2	0
Fenerbahçe	Total		57	0	0	0	17	0	0	0	74	0
Girona (loan)	2025–26	La Liga	0	0	0	0	—		—		0	0
Dinamo Zagreb (loan)	2025–26	HNL	14	0	1	0	2	0	—		17	0
Barcelona	2026–27	La Liga	1	0	0	0	0	0	0	0	1	0
Career total			383	0	15	0	93	0	2	0	494	0

=== International ===
As of match played 15 November 2026

Appearances and goals by national team and year
National team	Year	Apps	Goals
Croatia	2017	1	0
Croatia	2018	2	0
Croatia	2019	6	0
Croatia	2020	7	0
Croatia	2021	12 (Note: Four appearances in UEFA Euro 2020)	0
Croatia	2022	13 (Note: Seven appearances in 2022 FIFA World Cup)	0
Croatia	2023	10	0
Croatia	2024	11 (Note: Three appearances in UEFA Euro 2024)	0
Croatia	2025	9	0
Croatia	2026	14 (Note: Four appearances in 2026 FIFA World Cup)	0
Total		85	0

== Honours ==
NK Zagreb

- Druga HNL: 2013–14

Dinamo Zagreb

- HNL: 2017–18, 2018–19, 2019–20, 2020–21, 2021–22, 2022–23, 2025–26
- Croatian Cup: 2017–18, 2020–21, 2025–26
- Croatian Super Cup: 2019, 2022, 2023

Croatia

- FIFA World Cup runner-up: 2018; third place: 2022
- UEFA Nations League runner-up: 2022–23

Individual

- City of Zadar Award: 2018
- Honorary citizen of the Zadar County: 2019
- Trophy Footballer – Prva HNL Team of the Year: 2015, 2017, 2018, 2019, 2020, 2021, 2022, 2023
- Trophy Footballer – Best Croatian goalkeeper: 2019, 2020, 2021, 2022, 2023
- UEFA Europa League Squad of the Season: 2020–21

Orders

- Order of Duke Branimir: 2018
