= Petar Bočkaj =

Croatian footballer

Personal information
- Date of birth: 23 July 1996 (age 30)
- Place of birth: Zagreb, Croatia
- Height: 1.79 m (5 ft 10 in)
- Positions: Left-back; winger

Team information
- Current team: Varaždin
- Number: 12

Youth career
- 2003–2011: Zagorec
- 2011–2013: Dinamo Zagreb

Senior career*
Years	Team	Apps	(Gls)
2014–2015	Maksimir	25	(7)
2015–2016	Inter Zaprešić	30	(1)
2016–2017	Lokomotiva	27	(2)
2017–2021	Osijek	120	(14)
2021–2025	Dinamo Zagreb	39	(5)
2023–2024	→ Pafos (loan)	33	(2)
2025–	Varaždin	11	(0)

International career^{‡}
2013	Croatia U17	1	(0)
2013	Croatia U18	1	(0)
2017	Croatia U21	3	(1)
- * Club domestic league appearances and goals as of 15 June 2026 ‡ National team caps and goals as of 13 November 2017

Petar Bočkaj (born 23 July 1996) is a Croatian footballer who plays as a left-back or winger for Varaždin.

== Club career ==
Having passed through the ranks of the GNK Dinamo Zagreb youth academy, Bočkaj spent his first two professional seasons with NK Inter Zaprešić and NK Lokomotiva in the Croatian First Football League. In June 2017, he transferred to NK Osijek, together with his teammate Eros Grezda.

== International career ==
On 23 March 2017, Bočkaj made his debut for Croatia U21 in a friendly match against Slovenia.

== Career statistics ==
=== Club ===
As of 15 December 2024

Club	Season	League			National Cup		Continental		Other		Total	
Club	Season	Division	Apps	Goals	Apps	Goals	Apps	Goals	Apps	Goals	Apps	Goals
Inter Zaprešić	2015–16	Prva HNL	30	1	2	1	—		—		32	2
Lokomotiva	2016–17	Prva HNL	27	2	2	1	5	1	—		34	4
Osijek	2017–18	Prva HNL	29	4	2	1	8	3	—		39	8
Osijek	2018–19	Prva HNL	20	4	3	1	4	0	—		27	5
Osijek	2019–20	Prva HNL	24	4	2	3	2	0	—		28	7
Osijek	2020–21	Prva HNL	29	2	1	1	1	0	—		31	3
Osijek	2021–22	Prva HNL	18	0	3	1	3	0	—		24	1
Osijek	Total		120	14	11	7	18	3	—		149	24
Dinamo Zagreb	2021–22	Prva HNL	16	2	—		2	0	—		18	2
Dinamo Zagreb	2022–23	Prva HNL	22	3	2	1	4	1	—		28	5
Dinamo Zagreb	2024–25	Prva HNL	1	0	0	0	0	0	—		1	0
Dinamo Zagreb	Total		39	5	2	1	6	1	0	0	47	7
Pafos (loan)	2023–24	Cypriot First Division	33	2	5	0	—		—		38	2
Career total			249	24	22	10	29	5	0	0	300	39

== Honours ==
Pafos

- Cypriot Cup: 2023–24
