= Iyayi Atiemwen =

Nigerian footballer (born 1996)

Personal information
- Full name: Iyayi Believe Atiemwen
- Date of birth: 24 January 1996 (age 30)
- Place of birth: Ogbe, Nigeria
- Height: 1.80 m (5 ft 11 in)
- Positions: Forward; winger

Team information
- Current team: Al-Minaa
- Number: 88

Youth career
- Bendel Insurance

Senior career*
Years	Team	Apps	(Gls)
2016	Kayseri Erciyesspor	5	(2)
2016–2018	Çaykur Rizespor	4	(1)
2017	→ Şanlıurfaspor (loan)	8	(1)
2017	→ Manisaspor (loan)	14	(1)
2018–2019	Gorica	30	(12)
2019–2022	Dinamo Zagreb	40	(9)
2020	→ Lokomotiva (loan)	10	(1)
2021–2022	→ Omonia (loan)	9	(0)
2022	→ Gorica (loan)	9	(2)
2022–2023	Sheriff Tiraspol	15	(3)
2023–2024	Gostivari	14	(3)
2024–2025	Al-Najaf	9	(0)
2025–2026	Al-Minaa	19	(2)
- * Club domestic league appearances and goals as of 10 March 2026

Iyayi Believe Atiemwen (born 24 January 1996) is a Nigerian footballer who plays as a winger for Iraq Stars League club Al-Minaa.

== Club career ==
Atiemwen started his youth career at Bendel Insurance F.C. before moving to Kayseri Erciyesspor in 2016. After two years of unsuccessful spells in Turkey, he joined the Croatian second-tier club HNK Gorica where he made immediate impact and with whom he won the 2017–18 Croatian Second League.

Gorica gained promotion to the 2018–19 Croatian First League where they were labeled as the biggest surprise of the mid-season, finishing 5th. At the end of the year, Atiemwen was ranked third among the 2018 Prva HNL Player of the Year awards, behind Dani Olmo from Dinamo Zagreb and Héber from Rijeka.

On 22 January 2019, after spending a year at Gorica, Atiemwen signed a five-year contract with GNK Dinamo Zagreb.

On 15 February 2022, Atiemwen returned on loan to Gorica until the end of the season.

On 29 June 2022, Sheriff Tiraspol announced the signing of Atiemwen.

On 6 August 2025, Al-Minaa announced the signing of Nigerian striker to play in the Iraq Stars League. On 14 September, he made his debut for the team in a league match against Naft Maysan, which won 3–1, he scoring a brace and providing an assist.

== Personal life ==
In March 2019, accusations by two women were publicized, stating that Atiemwen had beaten them and attempted a rape in one case. One of the alleged victims announced she will officially press charges and Atiemwen was questioned by the police regarding the matter. Atiemwen himself denied the accusations, claiming he would never assault a woman, as his mother and three sisters would never forgive him.
