= 2019–20 Croatian First Football League =

Hrvatski Telekom Prva liga
- Season: 2019–20
- Dates: 19 July 2019 – 12 March 2020; 5 June 2020 – 25 July 2020
- Champions: Dinamo Zagreb
- Relegated: Inter Zaprešić
- Champions League: Dinamo Zagreb; Lokomotiva
- Europa League: Rijeka; Osijek; Hajduk Split
- Matches: 150
- Goals: 379 (2.53 per match)
- Top goalscorer: Antonio-Mirko Čolak; Mijo Caktaš; Mirko Marić (20 each)
- Biggest home win: Hajduk Split 6–0 Gorica
- Biggest away win: Rijeka 0–5 Dinamo Zagreb
- Highest scoring: Lokomotiva 6–1 Slaven Belupo
- Longest winning run: 6 games Dinamo Zagreb
- Longest unbeaten run: 13 games Dinamo Zagreb
- Longest winless run: 17 games Istra 1961
- Longest losing run: 15 games Inter Zaprešić
- Highest attendance: 29,580; Hajduk Split 1–0 Dinamo Zagreb
- Lowest attendance: 280; Inter Zaprešić 1–2 Lokomotiva
- Total attendance: 458,390
- Average attendance: 3,526

The 2019–20 Croatian First Football League (also known as 1. HNL; officially styled Hrvatski Telekom Prva liga for sponsorship reasons) was the 29th season of the Croatian First Football League, the national championship for men's association football teams in Croatia, since its establishment in 1992. The season started on 19 July 2019. It was temporarily postponed from 12 March to 5 June 2020 due to the COVID-19 pandemic.

The league was contested by ten teams.

== Teams ==
On 23 April 2019, Croatian Football Federation announced that the first stage of licensing procedure for 2019–20 season was complete. For the 2019–20 Prva HNL, only nine clubs were issued a top level license: Dinamo Zagreb, Gorica, Hajduk Split, Inter Zaprešić, Istra 1961, Osijek, Rijeka, Slaven Belupo and Varaždin. All of these clubs except Varaždin, who were newly promoted to the Prva HNL as champions of the 2018–19 Croatian Second Football League, were also issued a license for participating in UEFA competitions. In the second stage of licensing, clubs that were not licensed in the first stage could appeal on the decision.

=== Stadia and locations ===
Dinamo Zagreb	Gorica	Hajduk Split	Inter Zaprešić
Stadion Maksimir	Gradski stadion Velika Gorica	Stadion Poljud	Stadion Ivan Laljak-Ivić
Capacity: 35,123	Capacity: 5,000	Capacity: 34,198	Capacity: 5,228
Istra 1961	Locations of teams in 2019–20 Prva HNL		Lokomotiva
Stadion Aldo Drosina	Locations of teams in 2019–20 Prva HNL		Stadion Kranjčevićeva
Capacity: 9,800	Locations of teams in 2019–20 Prva HNL		Capacity: 5,350
Osijek	Rijeka	Slaven Belupo	Varaždin
Stadion Gradski vrt	Stadion Rujevica	Stadion Ivan Kušek-Apaš	Stadion Varteks
Capacity: 17,061	Capacity: 8,279	Capacity: 3,205	Capacity: 8,850

Team	City	Stadium	Capacity	Ref.
Dinamo Zagreb	Zagreb	Maksimir	35,423	
Gorica	Velika Gorica	Gradski stadion Velika Gorica	5,000	
Hajduk Split	Split	Poljud	34,198	
Inter Zaprešić	Zaprešić	Stadion ŠRC Zaprešić	5,228	
Istra 1961	Pula	Stadion Aldo Drosina	9,800	
Lokomotiva	Zagreb	Kranjčevićeva^{1}	5,350	
Osijek	Osijek	Gradski vrt	17,061	
Rijeka	Rijeka	Rujevica	8,279	
Slaven Belupo	Koprivnica	Stadion Ivan Kušek-Apaš	3,205	
Varaždin	Varaždin	Stadion Varteks	8,850	

- ^{1} Lokomotiva hosted their home matches at Stadion Kranjčevićeva. The stadium was originally the home ground of third-level side NK Zagreb.

Rank	Counties of Croatia	Number of teams	Club(s)
1	City of Zagreb	2	Dinamo Zagreb, Lokomotiva
2	Zagreb County	2	Gorica, Inter Zaprešić
3	Istria	1	Istra 1961
3	Koprivnica-Križevci	1	Slaven Belupo
3	Osijek-Baranja	1	Osijek
3	Primorje-Gorski Kotar	1	Rijeka
3	Split-Dalmatia	1	Hajduk Split
3	Varaždin	1	Varaždin

=== Personnel and kits ===
Club	Manager	Captain	Kit manufacturer	Sponsors
Dinamo Zagreb	(Croatia) Zoran Mamić	(North Macedonia) Arijan Ademi	Adidas	Lana grupa
Gorica	(Lithuania) Valdas Dambrauskas	(Croatia) Kristijan Kahlina	Alpas	-
Hajduk Split	(Croatia) Igor Tudor	(Croatia) Mijo Caktaš	Macron	Tommy
Inter Zaprešić	(Croatia) Tomislav Ivković	(Croatia) Tomislav Mazalović	Joma	-
Istra 1961	(Croatia) Ivan Prelec	(Croatia) Marin Grujević	Kelme	Croatia Osiguranje
Lokomotiva	(Croatia) Goran Tomić	(Croatia) Denis Kolinger	Adidas	-
Osijek	(Croatia) Ivica Kulešević	(Croatia) Mile Škorić	Nike	DOBRO
Rijeka	(Slovenia) Simon Rožman	(Croatia) Franko Andrijašević	Joma	Sava Osiguranje
Slaven Belupo	(Croatia) Tomislav Stipić	(Croatia) Mateas Delić	Adidas	Belupo
Varaždin	(Croatia) Samir Toplak	(Croatia) Leon Benko	Legea	TOKIĆ

=== Managerial changes ===
Team	Outgoing manager	Manner of departure	Date of vacancy	Replaced by	Date of appointment	Position in table
Istra 1961	(Croatia) Igor Cvitanović	Sacked	11 June 2019	(Croatia) Ivan Prelec	15 June 2019	Pre-season
Varaždin	(Croatia) Branko Karačić	Contract expired	17 June 2019	(Croatia) Borimir Perković	22 June 2019	Pre-season
Hajduk Split	(Croatia) Siniša Oreščanin	Sacked	19 July 2019	(Croatia) Damir Burić	20 July 2019	Pre-season
Osijek	(Croatia) Dino Skender	Sacked	21 September 2019	(Croatia) Ivica Kulešević	22 September 2019	4th
Rijeka	(Croatia) Igor Bišćan	Resigned	22 September 2019	(Slovenia) Simon Rožman	23 September 2019	3rd
Slaven Belupo	(Croatia) Ivica Sertić	Removed from position	7 October 2019	(Croatia) Tomislav Stipić	8 October 2019	8th
Varaždin	(Croatia) Borimir Perković	Sacked	8 October 2019	(Croatia) Luka Bonačić	9 October 2019	10th
Hajduk Split	(Croatia) Damir Burić	Mutual consent	19 December 2019	(Croatia) Igor Tudor	23 December 2019	2nd
Inter Zaprešić	(Croatia) Samir Toplak	Sacked	4 January 2020	(Montenegro) Željko Petrović	4 January 2020	8th
Varaždin	(Croatia) Luka Bonačić	Sacked	8 February 2020	(Croatia) Samir Toplak	10 February 2020	10th
Gorica	(Bosnia and Herzegovina) Sergej Jakirović	Sacked	24 February 2020	(Lithuania) Valdas Dambrauskas	25 February 2020	6th
Inter Zaprešić	(Montenegro) Željko Petrović	Sacked	8 April 2020	(Croatia) Tomislav Ivković		9th
Dinamo Zagreb	(Croatia) Nenad Bjelica	Sacked	16 April 2020	(Croatia) Igor Jovićević	22 April 2020	1st
Dinamo Zagreb	(Croatia) Igor Jovićević	Sacked	6 July 2020	(Croatia) Zoran Mamić	7 July 2020	1st

== League table ==
Pos	Team	Pld	W	D	L	GF	GA	GD	Pts	Qualification or relegation
1	Dinamo Zagreb (C)	36	25	5	6	62	20	+42	80	Qualification for the Champions League second qualifying round
2	Lokomotiva	36	19	8	9	57	38	+19	65	Qualification for the Champions League second qualifying round
3	Rijeka	36	19	7	10	58	42	+16	64	Qualification for the Europa League third qualifying round
4	Osijek	36	17	11	8	47	29	+18	62	Qualification for the Europa League second qualifying round
5	Hajduk Split	36	18	6	12	60	41	+19	60	Qualification for the Europa League second qualifying round
6	Gorica	36	12	13	11	44	48	−4	49	
7	Slaven Belupo	36	10	9	17	34	51	−17	39	
8	Varaždin	36	9	9	18	29	50	−21	36	
9	Istra 1961 (O)	36	5	10	21	27	59	−32	25	Qualification for the Relegation play-offs
10	Inter Zaprešić (R)	36	3	8	25	32	72	−40	17	Relegation to Croatian Second Football League

Source: PrvaHNL.hr
Rules for classification: 1) Points; 2) Head-to-head points; 3) Head-to-head goal difference; 4) Head-to-head goals scored (at home if two teams tied); 5) Goal difference; 6) Goals scored; 7) Play-off
(Note: Criteria 2-4 and 7 is only used if deciding champion, teams to international competition or teams for relegation and in that case criteria 6 will not be used).
(C) Champions; (O) Play-off winners; (R) Relegated

== Results ==
Each team played home-and-away against every other team in the league twice, for a total of 36 matches each played.

Home \ Away	DIN	GOR	HAJ	INT	IST	LOK	OSI	RIJ	SLA	VAR	DIN	GOR	HAJ	INT	IST	LOK	OSI	RIJ	SLA	VAR
Dinamo Zagreb	—	3–1	1–1	1–0	1–0	3–0	1–0	3–0	1–0	1–0	—	2–0	2–3	3–2	2–0	1–0	0–0	4–0	3–2	2–0
Gorica	2–4	—	2–1	1–1	1–1	0–0	3–1	2–0	2–0	1–0	0–0	—	3–1	1–1	3–0	1–3	0–0	0–0	0–0	0–1
Hajduk Split	1–0	3–0	—	3–1	2–0	3–0	3–2	0–4	2–0	2–0	0–2	6–0	—	2–1	2–1	1–0	0–1	2–3	2–1	2–3
Inter Zaprešić	1–2	0–2	1–1	—	0–2	1–2	3–3	1–4	3–1	2–2	0–1	0–3	1–4	—	2–0	0–2	0–1	0–1	0–2	1–2
Istra 1961	1–2	2–2	1–1	2–2	—	0–2	0–0	0–3	2–3	3–1	0–0	2–2	0–1	2–0	—	1–1	1–0	1–3	1–1	1–0
Lokomotiva	0–4	4–0	0–0	3–1	4–1	—	2–1	0–1	6–1	2–1	1–0	1–1	3–2	3–1	2–0	—	0–1	2–1	3–0	2–0
Osijek	0–0	2–1	1–0	3–1	1–0	4–0	—	3–2	2–0	2–2	1–0	2–1	0–0	1–1	2–0	1–2	—	1–0	3–2	2–0
Rijeka	0–5	1–2	1–1	1–1	2–0	1–1	1–1	—	3–1	2–1	2–0	1–2	2–0	4–1	4–2	2–2	1–0	—	1–0	3–1
Slaven Belupo	0–3	2–0	2–1	3–0	0–0	1–0	0–4	1–2	—	1–1	0–2	0–0	2–1	3–1	3–0	1–1	0–0	1–0	—	0–0
Varaždin	1–0	1–3	0–3	0–1	1–0	1–1	1–1	0–2	0–0	—	1–3	2–2	0–3	1–0	3–0	0–2	1–0	0–0	1–0	—

Source: Prva HNL (in Croatian)
Legend: Blue = home team win; Yellow = draw; Red = away team win.

== Relegation play-offs ==
At the end of the season, Istra 1961 contested a two-legged relegation play-off tie against Orijent 1919, the third-placed team of the 2019–20 Croatian Second Football League, since runners-up Croatia Zmijavci failed to apply for a top level license.

=== First leg ===
2 August 2020
20:00 CEST

Orijent 1919	0–3	Istra 1961
	Report	Gržan 8' (pen.), 64'; Maganjić 90+3'

Stadion Kantrida, Rijeka
Referee: Fran Jović

=== Second leg ===
5 August 2020
20:00 CEST

Istra 1961	0–1	Orijent 1919
	Report	Iličić 49'

Stadion Aldo Drosina, Pula
Referee: Igor Pajač

Istra 1961 won 3–1 on aggregate.

== Statistics ==
=== Top goalscorers ===
Rank	Player	Club	Goals
1	(Croatia) Antonio Čolak	Rijeka	20
1	(Croatia) Mijo Caktaš	Hajduk Split	20
1	(Croatia) Mirko Marić	Osijek	20
4	(Croatia) Kristijan Lovrić	Gorica	14
5	(Croatia) Mislav Oršić	Dinamo Zagreb	13
6	(Croatia) Ivan Krstanović	Slaven Belupo	12
7	(Nigeria) Emem Eduok	Hajduk Split	11
7	(Kosovo) Lirim Kastrati	Lokomotiva	11
7	(Croatia) Marko Tolić	Lokomotiva	11
10	(Poland) Damian Kądzior	Dinamo Zagreb	10

== Awards ==
=== Annual awards ===
Award	Winner	Club
Player of the Season	(Croatia) Bruno Petković	Dinamo Zagreb
Manager of the Season	(Croatia) Nenad Bjelica	Dinamo Zagreb
Young Player of the Season	(Croatia) Luka Ivanušec	Dinamo Zagreb

Team of the Year
Goalkeeper	(Croatia) Dominik Livaković (Dinamo Zagreb)				
Defence	(Brazil) Igor Silva (Osijek)		(Croatia) Mile Škorić (Osijek)	(Romania) Denis Kolinger (Lokomotiva)	
Midfield	(Croatia) Petar Bočkaj (Osijek)	(Croatia) Nikola Moro (Dinamo Zagreb)	(Croatia) Mijo Caktaš (Hajduk)	(North Macedonia) Arijan Ademi (Dinamo Zagreb)	(Kosovo) Lirim Kastrati (Lokomotiva)
Attack	(Croatia) Bruno Petković (Dinamo Zagreb)		(Croatia) Mirko Marić (Osijek)		
