= Denis Kolinger =

Croatian footballer

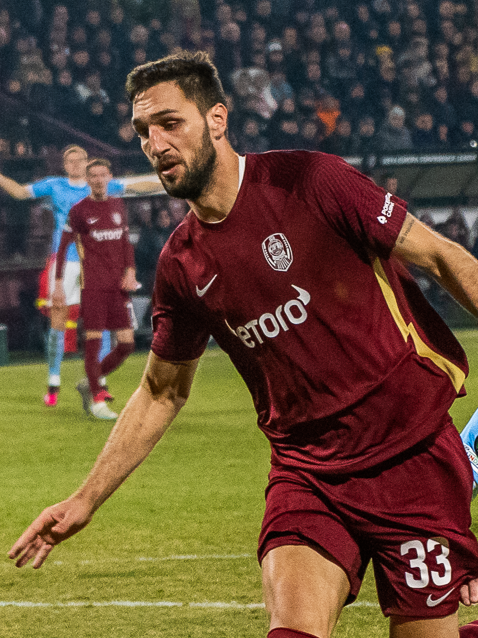
- Kolinger with CFR Cluj in 2023

Personal information
- Date of birth: 14 January 1994 (age 32)
- Place of birth: Malsch, Germany
- Height: 1.99 m (6 ft 6 in)
- Position: Centre-back

Team information
- Current team: Persija Jakarta
- Number: 30

Youth career
- 2000–2007: NK Jaska
- 2007–2012: NK Zagreb

Senior career*
Years	Team	Apps	(Gls)
2012–2016	NK Zagreb	102	(2)
2016–2021	Lokomotiva	128	(5)
2021–2024	Vejle	68	(2)
2022–2023	→ CFR Cluj (loan)	22	(2)
2024–2026	Lokomotiva	58	(1)
2026–	Persija Jakarta	8	(1)

International career^{‡}
2010	Croatia U16	5	(0)
2011	Croatia U17	3	(0)
2011	Croatia U18	3	(0)
2012	Croatia U19	2	(0)
2015	Croatia U21	6	(0)
2017	Croatia	1	(0)
- * Club domestic league appearances and goals as of 8 November 2026 ‡ National team caps and goals as of 27 March 2018

Denis Kolinger (born 14 January 1994) is a professional footballer who plays as a centre-back for Super League club Persija Jakarta. Born in Germany, he has represented the Croatia national team.

== Club career ==
Kolinger was born in Malsch, Germany where his parents were working before they returned to Stankovo in Croatia when he was three months old. He started out at NK Jaska in nearby Jastrebarsko, moving on to the NK Zagreb academy at the age of 13. He went through all the ranks of the club, debuting for the senior side in the 2011–12 season, becoming a first-team regular in the following season. After NK Zagreb was relegated after the 2015–16 season, Kolinger moved to NK Lokomotiva, signing a four-year contract.

On 15 January 2021, Kolinger moved to Danish Superliga club Vejle Boldklub on a three-year deal. In August 2024, Kolinger's contract was terminated by mutual agreement.

== International career ==
A Croatian youth international in U16, U17, U18 and U19 categories, Kolinger refused a call-up to the Croatia U21 national football team under Nenad Gračan in August 2014 claiming that he wanted to play for Germany, that he feels he is a German rather than a Croat and is therefore willing to take the chance and seek out German nationality, which he could since it is the country of his birth. However, in early 2015 he changed his mind, claiming that he realized it would be too hard for him to join the Germany U21 national football team and since March 2015 rejoined the Croatia U21 team.

He made his senior debut for Croatia in a May 2017 friendly match against Mexico, coming on as a 71st-minute substitute for Fran Tudor.

== Career statistics ==
=== Club ===
As of match played 21 December 2024

Appearances and goals by club, season and competition
Club	Season	League			National Cup (Note: Includes Croatian Cup, Danish Cup, Cupa României)		Continental		Other		Total	
Club	Season	Division	Apps	Goals	Apps	Goals	Apps	Goals	Apps	Goals	Apps	Goals
NK Zagreb	2011-12	1. HNL	1	0	0	0	—		—		1	0
NK Zagreb	2012-13	1. HNL	15	0	0	0	—		—		15	0
NK Zagreb	2013-14	2. HNL	31	0	2	0	—		—		33	0
NK Zagreb	2014-15	1. HNL	30	2	0	0	—		—		30	2
NK Zagreb	2015-16	1. HNL	25	0	2	0	—		—		27	0
NK Zagreb	Total		102	2	4	0	—		—		106	2
Lokomotiva Zagreb	2016-17	1. HNL	21	0	3	0	0	0	—		24	0
Lokomotiva Zagreb	2017-18	1. HNL	30	3	4	1	—		—		34	4
Lokomotiva Zagreb	2018-19	1. HNL	33	0	3	0	—		—		36	0
Lokomotiva Zagreb	2019-20	1. HNL	32	2	5	0	—		—		37	2
Lokomotiva Zagreb	2020-21	1 HNL	12	0	2	0	2 (Note: One appearance in UEFA Champions League, One appearance in UEFA Europa League)	0	—		16	0
Lokomotiva Zagreb	Total		128	5	17	1	2	0	—		147	6
Vejle	2020-21	Danish Superliga	18	1	2	0	—		—		20	1
Vejle	2021-22	Danish Superliga	29	1	7	1	—		—		36	2
Vejle	2023-24	Danish Superliga	19	0	2	0	—		—		21	0
Vejle	2024-25	Danish Superliga	2	0	0	0	—		—		2	0
Vejle	Total		68	2	11	1	—		—		79	3
CFR Cluj (loan)	2022-23	Liga I	21	1	2	0	8 (Note: One appearance in UEFA Champions League, Seven appearances in UEFA Europa Conference League)	0	1 (Note: Appearance(s) in Liga I European play-offs)	1	32	2
Lokomotiva Zagreb	2024-25	HNL	13	0	2	0	—		—		15	0
Career total			332	10	36	2	10	0	1	1	379	13

=== International ===
Appearances and goals by national team and year
National team	Year	Apps	Goals
Croatia	2017	1	0
Total		1	0

== Honours ==
NK Zagreb

- 2. NL: 2013–14

Lokomotiva Zagreb

- Croatian Cup runner-up: 2019–20

CFR Cluj

- Supercupa României runner-up: 2022
