= Prva HNL Player of the Year (Tportal) =

Croatian football award

The Prva HNL Player of the Year award (Croatian: Najbolji igrač Prve HNL) is an annual association football award given by the Croatian web portal Tportal.hr. It is awarded to the best football player who plays in the Prva HNL (or "1. HNL"), Croatian top flight. The winner is chosen by captains of all Prva HNL clubs.

The award was established in 2003. Eduardo and Sammir hold the record for most wins with two awards. The current award holder is Dani Olmo of GNK Dinamo Zagreb.

Another similar award is the Yellow Shirt Award which is based on aggregate player ratings in matches throughout the season as judged by the country's only sports daily Sportske novosti.

== Winners ==
Year	Player (Wins)	Club(s)
2003	(Croatia) Niko Kranjčar (1)	Dinamo Zagreb
2004	(Croatia) Tomislav Erceg (1)	Rijeka
2005	(Croatia) Eduardo (1)	Dinamo Zagreb
2006	(Croatia) Eduardo (2)	Dinamo Zagreb
2007	(Croatia) Luka Modrić (1)	Dinamo Zagreb
2008	(Croatia) Mario Mandžukić (1)	Dinamo Zagreb
2009	(Bosnia and Herzegovina) Ermin Zec (1)	Šibenik
2010	(Croatia) Sammir (1)	Dinamo Zagreb
2011	(Croatia) Ivan Santini (1)	Zadar
2012	(Croatia) Sammir (2)	Dinamo Zagreb
2013	(Croatia) Leon Benko (1)	Rijeka
2014	(Croatia) Andrej Kramarić (1)	Rijeka
2015	(Croatia) Marin Tomasov (1)	Rijeka
2016	(Croatia) Franko Andrijašević (1)	Rijeka
2017	(Algeria) El Arabi Hillel Soudani (1)	Dinamo Zagreb
2018	(Spain) Dani Olmo (1)	Dinamo Zagreb
2019	(Croatia) Bruno Petković (1)	Dinamo Zagreb
2020	(North Macedonia) Arijan Ademi (1)	Dinamo Zagreb
2021	(Croatia) Marko Livaja (1)	Hajduk Split
2022	(Croatia) Marko Livaja (2)	Hajduk Split
2023	(Croatia) Bruno Petković (2)	Dinamo Zagreb
2024	(Croatia) Marko Livaja (3)	Hajduk Split
2025	(Croatia) Toni Fruk (1)	Rijeka

== See also ==
- Sportske novosti Yellow Shirt award, for the HNL footballer of the year, given by the Croatian sport newspaper Sportske novosti, chosen by sport journalists.
- Croatian Footballer of the Year, given by the Croatian newspaper Večernji list, chosen by sport journalists.
- Football Oscar, given by the Croatian union Football syndicate, chosen by players and managers of league clubs.
