= 2013–14 HNK Rijeka season =

Rijeka
2013–14 season
- Chairman: Damir Mišković
- Manager: Matjaž Kek
- Stadium: Stadion Kantrida
- Prva HNL: 2nd
- Croatian Cup: Winners
- UEFA Europa League: Group stage
- Top goalscorer: League: Leon Benko; Andrej Kramarić (16 each); All: Andrej Kramarić (27)
- Highest home attendance: 10,500 v (Germany) VfB Stuttgart (22 August 2013)
- Lowest home attendance: 3,000 v RNK Split (1 March 2014)
- Average home league attendance: 5,500
Home colours	Away colours	Third colours

The 2013–14 season was the 68th season in HNK Rijeka’s history. It was their 23rd successive season in the Prva HNL, and 40th successive top tier season.

== Competitions ==
=== Overall ===
Competition	First match	Last match	Starting round	Final position	Record							
Competition	First match	Last match	Starting round	Final position	G	W	D	L	GF	GA	GD	Win %
Prva HNL	12 Jul 2013	17 May 2014	Matchday 1	Second	36	21	10	5	72	35	+37	58.33
Croatian Cup	9 Oct 2013	13 May 2014	First round	Winner	8	7	0	1	21	3	+18	87.50
UEFA Europa League	18 Jul 2013	12 Dec 2013	QR2	GS	12	4	6	2	17	12	+5	33.33
Total					56	32	16	8	110	50	+60	57.14

Last updated: 17 May 2014.

=== Prva HNL ===
==== Classification ====
Pos	Team	Pld	W	D	L	GF	GA	GD	Pts	Qualification or relegation
1	Dinamo Zagreb (C)	36	26	6	4	83	26	+57	84	Qualification to Champions League second qualifying round
2	Rijeka	36	21	10	5	72	35	+37	73	Qualification to Europa League second qualifying round
3	Hajduk Split	36	17	11	8	58	44	+14	62	Qualification to Europa League second qualifying round
4	RNK Split	36	14	10	12	41	41	0	52	Qualification to Europa League first qualifying round
5	Lokomotiva	36	15	7	14	57	59	−2	52	

Source: Sportnet.hr
Rules for classification: 1) points; 2) goal difference; 3) number of goals scored.
For deciding champions, qualification to UEFA Europa League and relegation: 1st points; 2nd head-to-head points; 3rd head-to-head goal difference; 4th head-to-head away goals scored
(C) Champions

==== Results summary ====
Overall								Home						Away					
Pld	W	D	L	GF	GA	GD	Pts	W	D	L	GF	GA	GD	W	D	L	GF	GA	GD
36	21	10	5	72	35	+37	73	11	7	0	43	16	+27	10	3	5	29	19	+10

Last updated: 17 May 2014.
Source: Sportnet.hr

==== Results by round ====
Round	1	2	3	4	5	6	7	8	9	10	11	12	13	14	15	16	17	18	19	20	21	22	23	24	25	26	27	28	29	30	31	32	33	34	35	36
Ground	H	A	H	A	H	H	A	H	A	A	H	A	H	A	A	H	A	H	H	A	H	A	H	H	A	H	A	A	H	A	H	A	A	H	A	H
Result	W	D	D	W	W	D	W	D	W	W	D	L	W	W	L	W	W	D	D	D	D	L	W	W	W	W	W	W	W	L	W	L	D	W	W	W
Position	2	4	4	4	3	3	3	2	3	2	2	3	3	3	3	3	2	2	2	2	3	3	3	3	3	3	2	2	2	2	2	2	2	2	2	2

Updated to match(es) played on 17 May 2014. Source: Competitive matches
A = Away; H = Home; W = Win; D = Draw; L = Loss

==== Results by opponent ====
Team	Results				Points
Team	1	2	3	4	Points
Dinamo Zagreb	0–0	0–1	2–2	0–4	2
Hajduk Split	1–1	1–1	2–2	4–1	6
Hrvatski Dragovoljac	2–0	2–0	2–0	3–1	12
Istra 1961	3–0	3–2	3–3	1–0	10
Lokomotiva	1–1	2–0	3–2	5–1	10
Osijek	5–1	3–1	1–0	0–2	9
Slaven Belupo	3–0	2–2	3–0	2–0	10
RNK Split	1–1	0–1	4–1	2–2	5
Zadar	2–1	3–0	0–1	3–0	9

Source: 2013–14 Prva HNL article

=== UEFA Europa League ===
Pos	Team	Pld	W	D	L	GF	GA	GD	Pts	Qualification	LYO	BET	VIT	RIJ
1	(France) Lyon	6	3	3	0	6	3	+3	12	Advance to knockout phase	—	1–0	1–1	1–0
2	(Spain) Real Betis	6	2	3	1	3	2	+1	9	Advance to knockout phase	0–0	—	1–0	0–0
3	(Portugal) Vitória de Guimarães	6	1	2	3	6	5	+1	5		1–2	0–1	—	4–0
4	(Croatia) Rijeka	6	0	4	2	2	7	−5	4		1–1	1–1	0–0	—

Source: Soccerway

== Matches ==
=== Prva HNL ===
12 July 2013 1	Rijeka	3–0	Istra 1961	Rijeka
19:00 CEST (UTC+02:00)	Tomečak 16'; Benko 39', 67'; Kvržić (yellow card) 74'	Report	Uzelac (yellow card) 85'	Stadium: Stadion Kantrida; Attendance: 5,000; Referee: Bruno Marić (Daruvar)

21 July 2013 2	Hajduk Split	1–1	Rijeka	Split
19:00 CEST (UTC+02:00)	Maglica 28'; Mikanović (yellow card) 53'; Maloča (yellow card) 72'	Report	Benko (yellow card) 11'; Škarabot (yellow card) 45'; Brezovec (yellow card) 55'; Maleš (yellow card) 60'; Kvržić 79'	Stadium: Stadion Poljud; Attendance: 20,000; Referee: Domagoj Ljubičić (Osijek)

28 July 2013 3	Rijeka	0–0	Dinamo Zagreb	Rijeka
19:00 CEST (UTC+02:00)	Maleš (yellow card) 49'	Report	Ademi (yellow card) 64'; Pivarić (yellow card) 82'	Stadium: Stadion Kantrida; Attendance: 10,000; Referee: Zlatko Šimčić (Koprivnica)

4 August 2013 4	Zadar	1–2	Rijeka	Zadar
19:00 CEST (UTC+02:00)	Sarić (yellow card) 45+1'; Ivančić 57'	Report	Lešković 29'; Krstanović (yellow card) 49'; Benko 83'	Stadium: Stadion Stanovi; Attendance: 2,000; Referee: Ante Vučemilović-Šimunović (Osijek)

12 August 2013 5	Rijeka	5–1	Osijek	Rijeka
20:15 CEST (UTC+02:00)	Benko 11', 58'; Alispahić 20', 22'; Pokrivač 89'	Report	Pušić (yellow card) 52'; Šimunec (yellow card) 80'; Lulić 84'	Stadium: Stadion Kantrida; Attendance: 6,000; Referee: Duje Strukan (Split)

17 August 2013 6	Rijeka	1–1	RNK Split	Rijeka
21:00 CEST (UTC+02:00)	Benko 30'; Lešković (yellow card) 90+1'	Report	Bilić 16' (pen.); Rugašević (yellow card) 43'; Rebić (yellow card) 45+1'; Paracki (yellow card) 62'; Radotić (yellow card) 80'; Križanac (red card) 88'; Galović (yellow card) 87'; Zagorac (yellow card) 90+2'	Stadium: Stadion Kantrida; Attendance: 6,000; Referee: Mario Zebec (Cestica)

25 August 2013 7	Hrvatski Dragovoljac	0–2	Rijeka	Zagreb
19:00 CEST (UTC+02:00)	Brtan (penalty missed) 25'	Report	Mujanović 22'; Zlomislić (yellow card) 29'; Bertoša (yellow card) 38'; Pokrivač 76'	Stadium: Stadion Kranjčevićeva; Attendance: 1,200; Referee: Tihomir Pejin (Donji Miholjac)

2 September 2013 8	Rijeka	1–1	Lokomotiva	Rijeka
20:15 CEST (UTC+02:00)	Maleš (yellow card) 36'; Kvržić 73'; Močinić (yellow card) 75'	Report	Trebotić 41'; Martinac (yellow card) 90+4'	Stadium: Stadion Kantrida; Attendance: 7,000; Referee: Ante Vučemilović-Šimunović (Osijek)

15 September 2013 9	Slaven Belupo	0–1	Rijeka	Koprivnica
19:00 CEST (UTC+02:00)	Gregurina (yellow card) 21'; Novinić (yellow card) 50'	Report	Kramarić 14'; Marić (yellow card) 23'; Kvržić (yellow card) 58'; Mujanović (yellow card) 81'; Vargić (yellow card) 88'; Pokrivač (yellow card) 89'	Stadium: Gradski stadion Attendance: 2,000; Referee: Duje Strukan (Split)

22 September 2013 10	Istra 1961	2–3	Rijeka	Pula
19:00 CEST (UTC+02:00)	Franjić 41'; Križman 48'; Blagojević (yellow card) 71'; Graf (yellow card) 84'; Jô (yellow card) 87'; Woon (red card) 90+1'	Report	Benko 22'; Pokrivač (yellow card) 27'; Maleš (yellow card) 43'; Kvržić 78'; Krstanović 83'; Močinić (yellow card) 86'; Mujanović (red card) 90+1'	Stadium: Stadion Aldo Drosina; Attendance: 4,000; Referee: Marko Matoc (Zaprešić)

28 September 2013 11	Rijeka	1–1	Hajduk Split	Rijeka
19:00 CEST (UTC+02:00)	Benko 25'; Krstanović (yellow card) 90+2'	Report	Kouassi 58' (yellow card) 90'; Sušić (yellow card) 90'; Jozinović (yellow card) 90+3'	Stadium: Stadion Kantrida; Attendance: 9,000; Referee: Ante Vučemilović-Šimunović (Osijek)

6 October 2013 12	Dinamo Zagreb	1–0	Rijeka	Zagreb
19:00 CEST (UTC+02:00)	Pivarić (yellow card) 47'; Ademi (yellow card) 54'; Soudani 90+3'	Report	Močinić (yellow card) 28'; Bertoša (yellow card) 39'; Datković (yellow card) 70'	Stadium: Stadion Maksimir; Attendance: 3,500; Referee: Tihomir Pejin (Donji Miholjac)

19 October 2013 13	Rijeka	3–0	Zadar	Rijeka
15:00 CEST (UTC+02:00)	Benko 53' (pen.) 87'; Kramarić 60'	Report	Matković (yellow card) 53'	Stadium: Stadion Kantrida; Attendance: 4,000; Referee: Dalibor Mlakar (Zagreb)

27 October 2013 14	Osijek	1–3	Rijeka	Osijek
19:00 CEST (UTC+02:00)	Novaković 65'; Babić (yellow card) 70'; Lukić (yellow card) 89'	Report	Kvržić 29'; Bertoša (yellow card) 45+2'; Kramarić 64'; Knežević (yellow card) 68'; Močinić 79'; Krstanović (yellow card) 90+1'	Stadium: Stadion Gradski vrt Attendance: 3,000; Referee: Mario Zebec (Cestica)

3 November 2013 15	RNK Split	1–0	Rijeka	Split
19:00 CET (UTC+01:00)	Ibriks (yellow card) 48'; Glavina 65'; Tomašević (yellow card) 80'; Križanac (yellow card) 90+4'	Report	Sharbini (yellow card) 65'; Vargić (yellow card) 68'; Brezovec (yellow card) 72'	Stadium: Stadion Park Mladeži; Attendance: 1,500; Referee: Igor Križarić (Čakovec)

1 December 2013 18	Rijeka	2–2	Slaven Belupo	Rijeka
19:00 CET (UTC+01:00)	Benko 41', 85'	Report	Rak (yellow card) 23' (goal) 64'; Matoš 31'; Pelin (yellow card) 90+1'	Stadium: Stadion Kantrida; Attendance: 4,000; Referee: Mario Zebec (Cestica)

4 December 2013 16	Rijeka	2–0	Hrvatski Dragovoljac	Rijeka
20:00 CET (UTC+01:00)	Maleš (yellow card) 35'; Sharbini (yellow card) 66'; Benko 73', 80' (yellow card) 73'; Datković (yellow card) 86'; Mujanović (yellow card) 90+1'	Report	Ljubičić (yellow card) 53'	Stadium: Stadion Kantrida; Attendance: 4,000; Referee: Igor Križarić (Čakovec)

8 December 2013 19	Rijeka	3–3	Istra 1961	Rijeka
19:00 CET (UTC+01:00)	Kramarić 4', 7', 84' (penalty missed) 70'; Brezovec (yellow card) 48'; Alispahić (yellow card) 75'	Report	Batarelo 6' (yellow card) 30'; Franjić 24'; Jô (yellow card) 36'; Radonjić (yellow card) 38'; Sačer (yellow card) 82'; Babić 83'; Čagalj (yellow card) 90+5'; Ježina (yellow card) 90+5'	Stadium: Stadion Kantrida; Attendance: 5,000; Referee: Danijel Trampus (Osijek)

15 December 2013 20	Hajduk Split	2–2	Rijeka	Split
19:00 CET (UTC+01:00)	Bradarić 76' (pen.); Maloča 90+1' (pen.)	Report	Benko 7'; Sharbini (yellow card) 18'; Kramarić 41'; Marić (yellow card) 51'; Maleš (red card) 90+1'	Stadium: Stadion Poljud; Attendance: 8,000; Referee: Fran Jović (Zagreb)

19 December 2013 17	Lokomotiva	0–2	Rijeka	Zagreb
18:00 CET (UTC+01:00)		Report	Brezovec (yellow card) 30'; Kvržić 36'; Krstanović (yellow card) 61'; Kramarić 63'; Bertoša (yellow card) 70'	Stadium: Stadion Maksimir; Attendance: 300; Referee: Domagoj Ljubičić (Osijek)

16 February 2014 22	Zadar	1–0	Rijeka	Zadar
17:00 CET (UTC+01:00)	Hrgović 65' (pen.) (red card) 83'; Con (red card) 70'; Šimurina (yellow card) 90+3'	Report	Moisés (yellow card) 55'; Benko (penalty missed) 84'	Stadium: Stadion Stanovi; Attendance: 2,000; Referee: Damir Batinić (Osijek)

23 February 2014 23	Rijeka	1–0	Osijek	Rijeka
17:00 CET (UTC+01:00)	Benko 36' (pen.); Bertoša (yellow card) 54'; Moisés (yellow card) 90+2'	Report	Pavić (yellow card) 26'; Mikulić (yellow card) 36'; Mišić (yellow card) 43'; Kurtović (yellow card) 76'	Stadium: Stadion Kantrida; Attendance: 4,000; Referee: Dalibor Mlakar (Zagreb)

26 February 2014 21	Rijeka	2–2	Dinamo Zagreb	Rijeka
17:00 CET (UTC+01:00)	Sharbini 13' (yellow card) 13'; Jugović (yellow card) 34'; Kramarić 55' (pen.) (yellow card) 55'; Mujanović (yellow card) 71'	Report	Ademi (yellow card) 34'; Halilović 63', 65'; Čop (yellow card) 85'	Stadium: Stadion Kantrida; Attendance: 7,000; Referee: Zlatko Šimčić (Koprivnica)

1 March 2014 24	Rijeka	4–1	RNK Split	Rijeka
17:00 CET (UTC+01:00)	Sharbini 13'; Kramarić 49', 78' (yellow card) 71'; Krstanović 85' (pen.)	Report	Roce 51'; Zagorac (red card) 83'	Stadium: Stadion Kantrida; Attendance: 3,000; Referee: Bruno Marić (Daruvar)

7 March 2014 25	Hrvatski Dragovoljac	0–2	Rijeka	Zagreb
17:00 CET (UTC+01:00)	Hrgović (yellow card) 79'; Špehar (yellow card) 83'	Report	Moisés 15'; Kramarić 17'; Bertoša (yellow card) 82'	Stadium: Stadion NŠC Stjepan Spajić; Attendance: 1,800; Referee: Domagoj Ljubičić (Osijek)

15 March 2014 26	Rijeka	3–2	Lokomotiva	Rijeka
19:00 CET (UTC+01:00)	Sharbini 19'; Kramarić 52'; Brezovec 80'	Report	Budimir 35', 36'; Pajač (yellow card) 90+2'	Stadium: Stadion Kantrida; Attendance: 5,000; Referee: Mario Zebec (Cestica)

23 March 2014 27	Slaven Belupo	0–3	Rijeka	Koprivnica
15:00 CET (UTC+01:00)	Pranjić (yellow card) 19'; Grgić (yellow card) 31'; Purić (yellow card) 57'; Crepulja (yellow card) 63'; Čanađija (penalty missed) 75'; Edson (yellow card) 90'	Report	Močinić (yellow card) 18' (goal) 80'; Maleš (yellow card) 43'; Krstanović 57' (pen.); Bertoša (yellow card) 74'; Kramarić 90' (pen.)	Stadium: Gradski stadion Attendance: 1,700; Referee: Igor Pristovnik (Zagreb)

30 March 2014 28	Istra 1961	0–1	Rijeka	Pula
19:00 CET (UTC+01:00)	Budicin (yellow card) 23'; Čagalj (red card) 38'; Jô (yellow card) 39'; Blagojević (yellow card) 66'; Lovrić (yellow card) 82'	Report	Knežević (yellow card) 16'; Krstanović 40' (pen.); Bertoša (yellow card) 42'; Kramarić (yellow card) 46'	Stadium: Stadion Aldo Drosina; Attendance: 2,500; Referee: Igor Križarić (Čakovec)

6 April 2014 29	Rijeka	4–1	Hajduk Split	Rijeka
15:00 CEST (UTC+02:00)	Krstanović 13' (pen.) 53' (pen.); Sharbini 69', 86' (yellow card) 70'	Report	Stipica (yellow card) 13'; Bašić (yellow card) 20'; Pašalić 28'; Maloča (red card) 52'	Stadium: Stadion Kantrida; Attendance: 9,500; Referee: Marijo Strahonja (Zagreb)

12 April 2014 30	Dinamo Zagreb	4–0	Rijeka	Zagreb
15:00 CEST (UTC+02:00)	Ademi 7' (yellow card) 34'; Pivarić 12' (yellow card) 25'; Čop 19'; Šimunić (yellow card) 20' (goal) 23'	Report	Krstanović (yellow card) 23'; Moisés (yellow card) 23'; Jugović (yellow card) 79'	Stadium: Stadion Maksimir; Attendance: 7,000; Referee: Ante Vučemilović-Šimunović (Osijek)

15 April 2014 31	Rijeka	3–0	Zadar	Rijeka
19:00 CEST (UTC+02:00)	Krstanović 17' (pen.) (yellow card) 60'; Lešković (yellow card) 20'; Brezovec (yellow card) 26'; Jugović 26'; Mitrović (yellow card) 45'; Tomečak 71'	Report	Ikić (yellow card) 16'; Oršulić (yellow card) 73'; Jerbić (yellow card) 90'	Stadium: Stadion Kantrida; Attendance: 5,000; Referee: Igor Križarić (Čakovec)

19 April 2014 32	Osijek	2–0	Rijeka	Osijek
19:00 CEST (UTC+02:00)	Barišić 29' (yellow card) 57'; Jonjić 77'; Perošević (yellow card) 78'	Report		Stadium: Stadion Gradski vrt Attendance: 3,000; Referee: Ante Vučemilović-Šimunović (Osijek)

27 April 2014 33	RNK Split	2–2	Rijeka	Split
19:00 CEST (UTC+02:00)	Erceg 49' (yellow card) 76'; Bilić (yellow card) 53' (goal) 60'; Kvesić (yellow card) 64'; Vidović (yellow card) 74'	Report	Brezovec (yellow card) 15'; Krstanović 20' (yellow card) 87'; Kramarić 34'; Mitrović (red card) 57'	Stadium: Stadion Park Mladeži; Attendance: 600; Referee: Zlatko Šimčić (Koprivnica)

2 May 2014 34	Rijeka	3–1	Hrvatski Dragovoljac	Rijeka
18:00 CEST (UTC+02:00)	Krstanović 19' (pen.); Brezovec (yellow card) 31'; Kramarić 54'; Lešković 60'; Mujanović (yellow card) 86'	Report	Lesjak (yellow card) 17'; Božić (yellow card) 45+1'; Jajčinović 68'; Ljubičić (yellow card) 90+1'	Stadium: Stadion Kantrida; Attendance: 3,723; Referee: Duje Strukan (Split)

10 May 2014 35	Lokomotiva	1–5	Rijeka	Zagreb
19:00 CEST (UTC+02:00)	Budimir 19'; Čalušić (red card) 34'	Report	Krstanović 24', 35' (pen.) 90+10' (yellow card) 90+8'; Alispahić 29' (yellow card) 42'; Ajayi 64'	Stadium: Stadion Maksimir; Attendance: 500; Referee: Tihomir Pejin (Donji Miholjac)

17 May 2014 36	Rijeka	2–0	Slaven Belupo	Rijeka
19:00 CEST (UTC+02:00)	Jugović (yellow card) 44'; Krstanović 55', 90+2'	Report	Edson (yellow card) 45'	Stadium: Stadion Kantrida; Attendance: 4,000; Referee: Igor Pristovnik (Zagreb)

Source: HRnogomet.com

=== Croatian Cup ===
9 October 2013 R1	Rijeka	11–0	BŠK Zmaj Blato	Rijeka
18:00 CEST (UTC+02:00)	Kramarić 4', 20' (pen.) 32', 51', 69', 73', 80', 85'; Brezovec 19'; Alispahić 61', 87'	Report		Stadium: Stadion Kantrida; Attendance: 3,000; Referee: Ivo Krečak (Šibenik)

30 October 2013 R2	Podravina Ludbreg	1–3	Rijeka	Ludbreg
14:00 CEST (UTC+02:00)	Pomper (yellow card) 24'; Jagec (yellow card) 55'; Bochl 59'	Report	Alispahić 66' (yellow card) 79'; Benko 76', 90' (pen.); Krstanović (yellow card) 86'	Stadium: Igralište NK Podravina; Attendance: 1,500; Referee: Dalibor Mlakar (Zagreb)

19 February 2014 QF	Rijeka	1–0	Osijek	Rijeka
17:00 CEST (UTC+02:00)	Maleš (yellow card) 30'; Bertoša (yellow card) 77'; Moisés 82'	Report	Mandić (yellow card) 24'; Jonjić (yellow card) 37'; Bralić (yellow card) 86'	Stadium: Stadion Kantrida; Attendance: 3,000; Referee: Igor Pristovnik (Zagreb)

12 March 2014 QF	Osijek	1–0 (1–1 agg.) (3–4 p)	Rijeka	Osijek
17:30 CET (UTC+01:00)	Pavić (yellow card) 54'; Dugandžić 55'; Mišić (yellow card) 90+2'	Report	Jugović (yellow card) 53'; Sharbini (yellow card) 56'; Lešković (yellow card) 89'	Stadium: Stadion Gradski vrt Attendance: 3,000; Referee: Marijo Strahonja (Zagreb)
	Penalties
	Vitaić (penalty scored); Škorić (penalty missed); Perošević (penalty missed); Dugandžić (penalty scored)		Krstanović (penalty scored); Brezovec (penalty scored); Kramarić (penalty scored); Moisés (penalty missed); Lešković (penalty scored)

19 March 2014 SF	Rijeka	2–1	Istra 1961	Rijeka
18:00 CET (UTC+01:00)	Kramarić 58', 61'; Lešković (yellow card) 66'; Moisés (yellow card) 90+1'	Report	Radonjić 8' (yellow card) 25'; Lovrić (yellow card) 90'	Stadium: Stadion Kantrida; Attendance: 7,000; Referee: Goran Gabrilo (Split)

26 March 2014 SF	Istra 1961	0–1 (1–3 agg.)	Rijeka	Pula
17:00 CET (UTC+01:00)		Report	Krstanović (yellow card) 55' (goal) 68'; Kramarić (yellow card) 82'	Stadium: Stadion Aldo Drosina; Attendance: 7,500; Referee: Bruno Marić (Daruvar)

7 May 2014 Final	Dinamo Zagreb	0–1	Rijeka	Zagreb
18:00 CEST (UTC+02:00)	Šimunović (yellow card) 45'; Čop (yellow card) 75'; Pinto (yellow card) 76'	Report	Tomečak 39'; Močinić (yellow card) 42'; Krstanović (yellow card) 59'; Leovac (red card) 90+3'; Zlomislić (red card) 85'	Stadium: Stadion Maksimir; Attendance: 10,324; Referee: Zlatko Šimčić (Koprivnica)

13 May 2014 Final	Rijeka	2–0 (3–0 agg.)	Dinamo Zagreb	Rijeka
20:00 CEST (UTC+02:00)	Mitrović 35'; Brezovec (yellow card) 39'; Leovac (yellow card) 40'; Kvržić 81'	Report	Šimunić (yellow card) 14'; Capan (yellow card) 20'; Ademi (yellow card) 64'	Stadium: Stadion Kantrida; Attendance: 10,000; Referee: Mario Zebec (Cestica)

Source: HRnogomet.com

=== UEFA Europa League ===
18 July 2013 QR2	Rijeka (Croatia)	5–0	(Wales) Prestatyn Town	Rijeka, Croatia
21:00 CEST (UTC+02:00)	Benko 19', 23', 59'; Brezovec (yellow card) 42'; Jugović 67'; Zlomislić 85'	Report	Owen (yellow card) 17'; Hessey (yellow card) 41'; Parker (yellow card) 58'; Kemp (yellow card) 84'	Stadium: Stadion Kantrida; Attendance: 8,344; Referee: Carlos Gómez (Spain)

25 July 2013 QR2	Prestatyn Town (Wales)	0–3 (0–8 agg.)	(Croatia) Rijeka	Rhyl, Wales
20:00 CEST (UTC+02:00)	Hessey (yellow card) 64'; Hunt (yellow card) 86'	Report	Močinić 37'; Boras 40'; Mujanović 65'; Bertoša (yellow card) 71'; Mance (yellow card) 77'	Stadium: Belle Vue; Attendance: 930; Referee: Dimitar Mečkarovski (Macedonia)

1 August 2013 QR3	Rijeka (Croatia)	2–1	(Slovakia) Žilina	Rijeka, Croatia
20:00 CEST (UTC+02:00)	Sharbini 3' (yellow card) 4'; Maleš (yellow card) 26'; Kvržić 59'; Močinić (yellow card) 68'	Report	Pečovský (yellow card) 45+1'; Majtán 74'; Žilák (yellow card) 90+3'	Stadium: Stadion Kantrida; Attendance: 7,000; Referee: Marco Fritz (Germany)

8 August 2013 QR3	Žilina (Slovakia)	1–1 (2–3 agg.)	(Croatia) Rijeka	Žilina, Slovakia
17:30 CEST (UTC+02:00)	Nunes (yellow card) 88'; Mihalík 89'	Report	Knežević (yellow card) 23' (red card) 89'; Pokrivač 50'; Škarabot (yellow card) 73'; Zlomislić (yellow card) 81'	Stadium: Štadión pod Dubňom; Attendance: 6,319; Referee: Antonio Damato (Italy)

22 August 2013 PO	Rijeka (Croatia)	2–1	(Germany) Stuttgart	Rijeka, Croatia
20:30 CEST (UTC+02:00)	Kvržić (yellow card) 57' (goal) 87'; Benko 74'	Report	Cacau (yellow card) 49'; Ibišević 89'	Stadium: Stadion Kantrida; Attendance: 10,000; Referee: Bas Nijhuis (Netherlands)

29 August 2013 PO	Stuttgart (Germany)	2–2 (3–4 agg.)	(Croatia) Rijeka	Stuttgart, Germany
18:00 CEST (UTC+02:00)	Gentner 34' (yellow card) 73'; Marić 75' (o.g.)	Report	Benko 30'; Maleš (yellow card) 40'; Tomečak (yellow card) 56'; Pokrivač (yellow card) 88'; Mujanović 90+4' (yellow card) 90+4'	Stadium: Mercedes-Benz Arena; Attendance: 30,200; Referee: Martin Hansson (Sweden)

19 September 2013 GS	Vitória de Guimarães (Portugal)	4–0	(Croatia) Rijeka	Guimarães, Portugal
21:05 CEST (UTC+02:00)	Malonga (yellow card) 22'; Ba 36'; Plange 48'; Maazou 68' (pen.); André 81'	Report	Močinić (yellow card) 39'; Boras (yellow card) 80'	Stadium: Estádio D. Afonso Henriques; Attendance: 9,794; Referee: Aleksei Kulbakov (Belarus)

3 October 2013 GS	Rijeka (Croatia)	1–1	(Spain) Real Betis	Rijeka, Croatia
19:00 CEST (UTC+02:00)	Benko 10'; Brezovec (yellow card) 34'; Krstanović (yellow card) 42'; Boras (yellow card) 64'	Report	Cedrick 14'; Torres (yellow card) 34'; Perquis (yellow card) 41'	Stadium: Stadion Kantrida; Attendance: 7,313; Referee: Serhiy Boiko (Ukraine)

24 October 2013 GS	Lyon (France)	1–0	(Croatia) Rijeka	Lyon, France
19:00 CEST (UTC+02:00)	Lacazette (yellow card) 9'; Grenier 65'	Report	Mujanović (yellow card) 24'; Bertoša (yellow card) 54'	Stadium: Stade de Gerland; Attendance: 30,461; Referee: Artur Dias (Portugal)

7 November 2013 GS	Rijeka (Croatia)	1–1	(France) Lyon	Rijeka, Croatia
21:05 CEST (UTC+02:00)	Kramarić 21' (yellow card) 56'; Bertoša (yellow card) 79'	Report	Pléa 14'; Lopes (yellow card) 72'	Stadium: Stadion Kantrida; Attendance: 7,300; Referee: Alon Yefet (Israel)

28 November 2013 GS	Rijeka (Croatia)	0–0	(Portugal) Vitória de Guimarães	Rijeka, Croatia
19:00 CEST (UTC+02:00)	Knežević (yellow card) 90+2'	Report	Olímpio (yellow card) 50'	Stadium: Stadion Kantrida; Attendance: 7,138; Referee: Kristinn Jakobsson (Iceland)

12 December 2013 GS	Real Betis (Spain)	0–0	(Croatia) Rijeka	Sevilla, Spain
21:05 CEST (UTC+02:00)		Report	Kvržić (yellow card) 45'; Maleš (yellow card) 59'	Stadium: Estadio Benito Villamarín; Attendance: 14,556; Referee: Danny Makkelie (Netherlands)

Source: uefa.com

=== Friendlies ===
==== Pre-season ====
18 June 2013 Friendly	Rijeka	4–0	Stupnik	Vrata
	Pilčić 5'; Benko 63'; Sharbini 79'; Pokrivač 90'	Report		Stadium: Igralište Gmajna; Attendance: 150; Referee: Milan Kukuljan (Podkilavac)

22 June 2013 Friendly	Olimpija Ljubljana (Slovenia)	0–4	(Croatia) Rijeka	Kranj, Slovenia
		Report	Knežević 15'; Benko 29'; Kvržić 72'; Alispahić 87'	Stadium: Stanko Mlakar Stadium; Attendance: 200; Referee: David Šmajc (Kranj)

25 June 2013 Friendly	Triglav Kranj (Slovenia)	0–4	(Croatia) Rijeka	Kranj, Slovenia
		Report	Pilčić 1'; Alispahić 54'; Ajayi 61'; Brezovec 83'	Stadium: Stanko Mlakar Stadium; Attendance: – Referee: Marko Podgoršek (Duplje)

29 June 2013 Friendly	Rijeka (Croatia)	3–1	(Bulgaria) Ludogorets Razgrad	Hermagor-Pressegger See, Austria
	Sharbini 22', 57'; Ajayi 69'	Report	Marcelinho 82' (pen.)	Stadium: SC Hermagor Sportplatz; Attendance: –

2 July 2013 Friendly	Rijeka (Croatia)	8–0	(Slovenia) Šampion Celje	Kostrena
	Lešković 16'; Čulina 25', 42'; Tadić 33'; Zlomislić 35'; Pilčić 52', 54'; Ajayi 90'	Report		Stadium: Stadion Žuknica; Attendance: 1,000; Referee: Ivan Bebek (Rijeka)

5 July 2013 Friendly	Rijeka (Croatia)	2–1	(Slovenia) Koper	Rijeka
	Sharbini 23'; Zlomislić 82'	Report	Brečević 45'	Stadium: Stadion Kantrida; Attendance: 2,500; Referee: Goran Brusić (Rijeka)

==== On-season ====
10 September 2013 Friendly	Grobničan	2–3	Rijeka	Čavle
	Sobotinčić 7'; Sertić 76'	Report	Krstanović 13'; Kramarić 16'; Cesarec 56'	Stadium: Stadion Mavrinci; Attendance: 800; Referee: Danijel Klarić (Ratulje)

2 April 2014 Friendly	Grobničan	0–1	Rijeka	Čavle
		Report	Sharbini 3'	Stadium: Stadion Mavrinci; Attendance: 500; Referee: Tomislav Frlan (Podhum)

8 April 2014 Friendly	Rijeka	3–0	Opatija	Kostrena
	Kramarić 4', 9' (pen.); Pušić 76'	Report		Stadium: Stadion Žuknica; Attendance: 250; Referee: Danijel Trbulin (Rijeka)

==== Mid-season ====
19 January 2014 Friendly	Rijeka (Croatia)	2–2	(Hungary) Videoton	Mijas, Spain
	Benko 35' (pen.); Vinícius 55' (o.g.)	Report	Nikolić 2'; Oliveira 49'	Stadium: La Cala Resort; Attendance: 50; Referee: Robles Sorroche (Marbella)

22 January 2014 Friendly	Rijeka (Croatia)	1–1	(Switzerland) Grasshopper	Mijas, Spain
	Krstanović 68'	Report	Salatić 90' (pen.)	Stadium: La Cala Resort; Attendance: 100; Referee: Dominguez Cervantes (Mallorca)

26 January 2014 Friendly	Rijeka (Croatia)	1–4	(Ukraine) Dynamo Kyiv	Mijas, Spain
	Krstanović 65' (pen.)	Report	Veloso 36'; Bezus 47'; Ideye 56'; Vida 73'	Stadium: La Cala Resort; Attendance: 200; Referee: Juan Francisco Caravaca (Marbella)

29 January 2014 Friendly	Koper (Slovenia)	0–1	(Croatia) Rijeka	Koper, Slovenia
		Report	Krstanović 28'	Stadium: Bonifika Stadium; Attendance: 150; Referee: Robert Ponis (Koper)

4 February 2014 Friendly	Rijeka	5–0	Grobničan	Krk
	Alispahić 17'; Kramarić 26', 57'; Moisés 45'; Sharbini 70'	Report		Stadium: SRC Josip Uravić Pepi; Attendance: 300; Referee: Domagoj Vučkov (Rijeka)

12 February 2014 Friendly	Krk	1–3	Rijeka	Krk
	Jović 65' (pen.)	Report	Benko 8'; Kvržić 52'; Krstanović 67'	Stadium: SRC Josip Uravić Pepi; Attendance: 350; Referee: Vedran Jelinčić (Kastav)

== Player seasonal records ==
Competitive matches only. Updated to games played on 17 May 2014.

=== Goals ===
Rank	Name	League	Europe	Cup	Total
1	(Croatia) Andrej Kramarić	16	1	10	27
2	(Croatia) Leon Benko	16	6	2	24
3	(Croatia) Ivan Krstanović	14	–	1	15
4	(Bosnia and Herzegovina) Zoran Kvržić	5	2	1	8
5	(Croatia) Anas Sharbini	5	1	–	6
5	(Bosnia and Herzegovina) Mehmed Alispahić	3	–	3	6
7	(Croatia) Ivan Močinić	2	1	–	3
7	(Croatia) Nikola Pokrivač	2	1	–	3
7	(Croatia) Ivan Tomečak	2	–	1	2
7	(Croatia) Goran Mujanović	1	2	–	3
11	(Croatia) Marko Lešković	2	–	–	2
11	(Croatia) Vedran Jugović	1	1	–	2
11	(Croatia) Josip Brezovec	1	–	1	2
11	(Brazil) Moisés Lima Magalhães	1	–	1	2
15	(Nigeria) Goodness Ajayi	1	–	–	1
15	(Croatia) Ivan Boras	–	1	–	1
15	(Bosnia and Herzegovina) Damir Zlomislić	–	1	–	1
15	(Croatia) Matej Mitrović	–	–	1	1
TOTALS		72	17	21	110

Source: Competitive matches

=== Assists ===
Rank	Name	League	Europe	Cup	Total
1	(Croatia) Anas Sharbini	9	2	2	13
2	(Croatia) Josip Brezovec	6	–	3	9
3	(Croatia) Ivan Krstanović	6	–	2	8
3	(Croatia) Ivan Tomečak	5	3	–	8
5	(Croatia) Andrej Kramarić	5	–	2	7
6	(Croatia) Leon Benko	4	2	–	6
6	(Croatia) Ivan Boras	4	1	1	6
8	(Bosnia and Herzegovina) Zoran Kvržić	4	1	–	5
8	(Croatia) Mateo Bertoša	2	–	3	5
8	(Croatia) Vedran Jugović	1	2	2	5
11	(Bosnia and Herzegovina) Mehmed Alispahić	3	–	1	4
11	(Brazil) Moisés Lima Magalhães	3	–	1	4
11	(Croatia) Nikola Pokrivač	2	1	1	4
14	(Croatia) Goran Mujanović	3	–	–	3
15	(Nigeria) Goodness Ajayi	2	–	–	2
15	(Croatia) Domagoj Pušić	1	–	1	2
17	(Croatia) Antonini Čulina	1	–	–	1
17	(Austria) Marin Leovac	1	–	–	1
17	(Slovenia) Matija Škarabot	1	–	–	1
17	(Bosnia and Herzegovina) Damir Zlomislić	1	–	–	1
17	(Croatia) Luka Marić	–	1	–	1
17	(Croatia) Ivan Močinić	–	1	–	1
TOTALS		64	14	19	97

Source: Competitive matches

=== Clean sheets ===
Rank	Name	League	Europe	Cup	Total
1	(Croatia) Ivan Vargić	12	3	4	19
2	(Croatia) Ivan Mance	–	1	1	2
2	(Croatia) Andrej Prskalo	1	–	–	1
TOTALS		13	4	5	22

Source: Competitive matches

=== Disciplinary record ===
Number	Position	Name	1. HNL (Note: Two yellow cards resulting in a red are counted as a total of three cards - i.e. two yellow and one red card.)		Europe		Croatian Cup		Total	
Number	Position	Name	Booked	Sent off (straight red)	Booked	Sent off (straight red)	Booked	Sent off (straight red)	Booked	Sent off (straight red)
1	GK	(Croatia) Ivan Mance	0	0	1	0	0	0	1	0
4	DF	(Slovenia) Matija Škarabot	1	0	1	0	0	0	2	0
5	DF	(Croatia) Dario Knežević	2	0	2	1	0	0	4	1
6	DF	(Croatia) Niko Datković	2	0	0	0	0	0	2	0
7	MF	(Bosnia and Herzegovina) Mehmed Alispahić	2	0	0	0	1	0	3	0
8	MF	(Croatia) Goran Mujanović	6	1	2	0	0	0	8	1
10	MF	(Croatia) Anas Sharbini	5	0	1	0	1	0	7	0
11	MF	(Croatia) Ivan Tomečak	0	0	1	0	0	0	1	0
13	MF	(Croatia) Marko Lešković	2	0	0	0	2	0	4	0
14	DF	(Croatia) Ivan Boras	0	0	2	0	0	0	2	0
15	DF	(Croatia) Matej Mitrović	3	1	0	0	0	0	3	1
16	MF	(Croatia) Ivan Močinić	4	0	2	0	1	0	7	0
19	FW	(Croatia) Leon Benko	3	0	0	0	0	0	3	0
20	MF	(Bosnia and Herzegovina) Zoran Kvržić	2	0	2	0	0	0	4	0
21	MF	(Bosnia and Herzegovina) Damir Zlomislić	1	0	1	0	0	1	2	1
22	DF	(Austria) Marin Leovac	0	0	0	0	3	1	3	1
23	DF	(Croatia) Luka Marić	2	0	0	0	0	0	2	0
24	DF	(Croatia) Mateo Bertoša	8	0	3	0	1	0	12	0
25	GK	(Croatia) Ivan Vargić	2	0	0	0	0	0	2	0
26	MF	(Croatia) Mate Maleš	8	1	3	0	1	0	12	1
27	MF	(Croatia) Nikola Pokrivač	2	0	1	0	1	0	4	0
30	MF	(Croatia) Josip Brezovec	8	0	2	0	2	0	12	0
88	MF	(Brazil) Moisés	3	0	0	0	1	0	4	0
89	MF	(Croatia) Vedran Jugović	3	0	0	0	1	0	4	0
91	FW	(Croatia) Andrej Kramarić	3	0	1	0	1	0	5	0
99	FW	(Croatia) Ivan Krstanović	8	0	1	0	3	0	12	0
TOTALS			80	3	26	1	19	2	125	6

Source: nk-rijeka.hr

=== Appearances and goals ===
Number	Position	Player	Apps	Goals	Apps	Goals	Apps	Goals	Apps	Goals
Number	Position	Player	Total		1. HNL (Note: First number represents appearances in starting eleven, while the second number indicates a substitute appearance.)		Europa League		Croatian Cup	
1	GK	(Croatia) Ivan Mance	2	0	0+0	0	1+0	0	1+0	0
4	DF	(Slovenia) Matija Škarabot	10	0	4+0	0	4+1	0	1+0	0
5	DF	(Croatia) Dario Knežević	38	0	26+0	0	8+0	0	4+0	0
6	DF	(Croatia) Niko Datković	8	0	3+2	0	2+0	0	1+0	0
7	MF	(Bosnia and Herzegovina) Mehmed Alispahić	32	6	13+8	3	7+1	0	2+1	3
8	FW	(Croatia) Goran Mujanović	42	3	21+8	1	3+4	2	4+2	0
9	FW	(Croatia) Danijel Cesarec	1	0	0+0	0	0+0	0	0+1	0
10	MF	(Croatia) Antonini Čulina	3	0	0+2	0	0+1	0	0+0	0
10	MF	(Croatia) Anas Sharbini	38	6	22+2	5	5+3	1	4+2	0
11	MF	(Croatia) Ivan Tomečak	41	3	26+1	2	9+1	0	4+0	1
13	MF	(Croatia) Marko Lešković	25	2	15+0	2	5+0	0	4+1	0
14	DF	(Croatia) Ivan Boras	17	1	8+2	0	3+2	1	2+0	0
15	DF	(Croatia) Matej Mitrović	12	1	7+1	0	0+0	0	4+0	1
16	MF	(Croatia) Ivan Močinić	47	3	24+5	2	8+3	1	4+3	0
17	FW	(Nigeria) Goodness Ohiremen Ajayi	14	1	4+7	1	1+0	0	2+0	0
19	FW	(Croatia) Leon Benko	33	24	19+1	16	11+0	6	0+2	2
20	MF	(Bosnia and Herzegovina) Zoran Kvržić	42	8	17+12	5	7+3	2	3+0	1
21	MF	(Bosnia and Herzegovina) Damir Zlomislić	15	1	5+4	0	1+3	1	0+2	0
22	DF	(Austria) Marin Leovac	13	0	8+2	0	0+0	0	2+1	0
23	DF	(Croatia) Luka Marić	32	0	19+0	0	9+0	0	3+1	0
24	DF	(Croatia) Mateo Bertoša	32	0	18+1	0	7+0	0	5+1	0
25	GK	(Croatia) Ivan Vargić	52	0	34+0	0	11+0	0	7+0	0
26	MF	(Croatia) Mate Maleš	37	0	20+2	0	12+0	0	3+0	0
27	MF	(Croatia) Nikola Pokrivač	26	3	7+9	2	5+3	1	2+0	0
28	FW	(Croatia) Josip Tadić	2	0	0+1	0	1+0	0	0+0	0
29	FW	(Croatia) Dražen Pilčić	1	0	0+0	0	0+1	0	0+0	0
29	MF	(Croatia) Domagoj Pušić	4	0	0+3	0	0+0	0	0+1	0
30	MF	(Croatia) Josip Brezovec	38	2	16+9	1	3+3	0	6+1	1
32	GK	(Croatia) Andrej Prskalo	2	0	2+0	0	0+0	0	0+0	0
50	DF	(Croatia) Ricardo Bagadur	1	0	0+0	0	0+0	0	0+1	0
88	MF	(Brazil) Moisés Lima Magalhães	21	2	11+4	1	0+0	0	6+0	1
89	MF	(Croatia) Vedran Jugović	31	2	14+6	1	4+0	1	5+2	0
91	FW	(Croatia) Andrej Kramarić	34	27	22+2	16	3+1	1	5+1	10
99	FW	(Croatia) Ivan Krstanović	37	15	11+13	14	3+5	0	4+1	1

=== Penalties ===
For
Date	Competition	Player	Opposition	Scored?
9 Oct 2013	Cup	(Croatia) Andrej Kramarić	Zmaj Blato	✓
19 Oct 2013	1. HNL	(Croatia) Leon Benko	Zadar	✓
30 Oct 2013	Cup	(Croatia) Leon Benko	Podravina	✓
8 Dec 2013	1. HNL	(Croatia) Andrej Kramarić	Istra 1961	✗
16 Feb 2014	1. HNL	(Croatia) Leon Benko	Zadar	✗
23 Feb 2014	1. HNL	(Croatia) Leon Benko	Osijek	✓
26 Feb 2014	1. HNL	(Croatia) Andrej Kramarić	Dinamo Zagreb	✓
1 Mar 2014	1. HNL	(Croatia) Ivan Krstanović	RNK Split	✓
23 Mar 2014	1. HNL	(Croatia) Ivan Krstanović	Slaven Belupo	✓
23 Mar 2014	1. HNL	(Croatia) Andrej Kramarić	Slaven Belupo	✓
30 Mar 2014	1. HNL	(Croatia) Ivan Krstanović	Istra 1961	✓
6 Apr 2014	1. HNL	(Croatia) Ivan Krstanović	Hajduk Split	✓
6 Apr 2014	1. HNL	(Croatia) Ivan Krstanović	Hajduk Split	✓
15 Apr 2014	1. HNL	(Croatia) Ivan Krstanović	Zadar	✓
2 May 2014	1. HNL	(Croatia) Ivan Krstanović	H. Dragovoljac	✓
10 May 2014	1. HNL	(Croatia) Ivan Krstanović	Lokomotiva	✓
Against
Date	Competition	Player	Opposition	Scored?
17 Aug 2013	1. HNL	(Croatia) Ivan Vargić	RNK Split	✓
25 Aug 2013	1. HNL	(Croatia) Ivan Vargić	H. Dragovoljac	✗
19 Sep 2013	UEL	(Croatia) Ivan Vargić	Vitória	✓
15 Dec 2013	1. HNL	(Croatia) Ivan Vargić	Hajduk Split	✓
15 Dec 2013	1. HNL	(Croatia) Ivan Vargić	Hajduk Split	✓
16 Feb 2014	1. HNL	(Croatia) Ivan Vargić	Zadar	✓
23 Mar 2014	1. HNL	(Croatia) Ivan Vargić	Slaven Belupo	✗

=== Overview of statistics ===
Statistic	Overall	Prva HNL	Croatian Cup	Europa League
Most appearances	Vargić (52)	Vargić (34)	4 players (7)	Maleš (12)
Most starts	Vargić (52)	Vargić (34)	Vargić (7)	Maleš (12)
Most substitute appearances	Krstanović (19)	Krstanović (13)	Močinić (3)	Krstanović (5)
Most minutes played	Vargić (4680)	Vargić (3060)	Vargić (630)	Maleš (1014)
Top goalscorer	Kramarić (27)	Benko & Kramarić (16)	Kramarić (10)	Benko (6)
Most assists	Sharbini (13)	Sharbini (9)	Bertoša & Brezovec (3)	Tomečak (3)
Most yellow cards	4 players (12)	4 players (8)	Krstanović (3)	Maleš & Bertoša (3)
Most red cards	6 players (1)	3 players (1)	Zlomislić & Leovac (1)	Knežević (1)
Last updated: 17 May 2014

== Transfers ==
=== In ===
Date	Pos.	Player	Moving from	Type	Fee
7 Feb 2013	GK	(Croatia) Ivan Vargić	(Croatia) Osijek	Transfer	€1.2 million
7 Feb 2013	RM	(Croatia) Vedran Jugović	(Croatia) Osijek	Transfer	€1.2 million
7 Feb 2013	CB	(Croatia) Marko Lešković	(Croatia) Osijek	Transfer	€1.2 million
7 Feb 2013	RW	(Bosnia and Herzegovina) Zoran Kvržić	(Croatia) Osijek	Transfer	€1.2 million
24 May 2013	LW	(Croatia) Anas Sharbini	(Saudi Arabia) Ittihad	Transfer	Free
30 May 2013	LB	(Croatia) Mateo Bertoša	(Bosnia and Herzegovina) Široki Brijeg	Transfer	€100,000
30 May 2013	CM	(Bosnia and Herzegovina) Damir Zlomislić	(Bosnia and Herzegovina) Široki Brijeg	Transfer	€100,000
4 Jun 2013	CF	(Croatia) Josip Tadić	(Australia) Melbourne Heart	Transfer	Free
7 Jun 2013	RB	(Croatia) Ivan Tomečak	(Croatia) Dinamo Zagreb	Transfer	Undisclosed
7 Jun 2013	CM	(Croatia) Nikola Pokrivač	(Croatia) Dinamo Zagreb	Transfer	Undisclosed
7 Jun 2013	DM	(Croatia) Mate Maleš	(Croatia) Lokomotiva	Transfer	Undisclosed
7 Jun 2013	RB	(Croatia) Ivan Boras	(Croatia) Lokomotiva	Transfer	Undisclosed
15 Jul 2013	CF	(Croatia) Ivan Krstanović	(Croatia) Dinamo Zagreb	Transfer	Undisclosed
15 Jun 2013	CF	(Croatia) Dražen Pilčić	(Croatia) Pomorac	Return from loan	—N/a
30 Aug 2013	CF	(Croatia) Andrej Kramarić	(Croatia) Dinamo Zagreb	Transfer	€1.2 million
4 Sep 2013	CM	(Croatia) Domagoj Pušić	(Croatia) Osijek	Transfer	€190,000
4 Sep 2013	CB	(Croatia) Matej Mitrović	(Croatia) Cibalia	Transfer	€130,000
13 Jan 2014	CM	(Brazil) Moisés Lima Magalhães	(Brazil) Portuguesa	Transfer	Undisclosed
14 Jan 2014	GK	(Croatia) Andrej Prskalo	(Croatia) Istra 1961	Transfer	Free
31 Jan 2014	LB	(Austria) Marin Leovac	Austria Wien	Transfer	€250,000

Source: Glasilo Hrvatskog nogometnog saveza

=== Out ===
Date	Pos.	Player	Moving to	Type	Fee
27 May 2013	CM	(Croatia) Damir Kreilach	(Germany) Union Berlin	Transfer	€450,000
29 May 2013	RB	(Croatia) Kristijan Čaval	—N/a	Retirement	—N/a
29 May 2013	RM	(Croatia) Drago Gabrić	(Slovenia) Domžale	Loan (until 30/6/2014)	—N/a
29 May 2013	CF	(Slovenia) Kris Jogan	(Italy) Verona	End of loan	—N/a
29 May 2013	GK	(Croatia) Robert Lisjak	(Croatia) Istra	Transfer	Free
29 May 2013	CF	(Belgium) Andréa Mbuyi-Mutombo	(Croatia) Istra 1961	Transfer	Free
29 May 2013	RB	(Poland) Łukasz Mierzejewski	(Poland) Górnik Łęczna	Transfer	Free
10 Jun 2013	AM	(Croatia) Ivor Weitzer	(Iran) Malavan	Transfer	Free
9 Jul 2013	CB	(Croatia) Adam Sušac	(Germany) Dynamo Dresden	Transfer	€70,000
23 Jul 2013	AM	(Croatia) Antonini Čulina	(Italy) Spezia	Loan (until 30/6/2014)	—N/a
2 Aug 2013	RB	(Croatia) Mato Miloš	(Italy) Siena	Loan (until 30/6/2014)	—N/a
9 Aug 2013	LB	(Nigeria) Jamilu Collins	(Croatia) Pomorac	Loan (until 30/6/2014)	—N/a
9 Aug 2013	GK	(Croatia) Simon Sluga	(Croatia) Pomorac	Loan (until 30/6/2014)	—N/a
24 Aug 2013	CF	(Croatia) Dražen Pilčić	(Slovenia) Koper	Transfer	Free
2 Sep 2013	CB	(Croatia) Mato Neretljak	(Croatia) Zadar	Loan (until 15/6/2014)	—N/a
2 Sep 2013	CF	(Croatia) Josip Tadić	(Croatia) Zadar	Loan (until 30/6/2014)	—N/a
21 Dec 2013	GK	(Croatia) Ivan Mance	—N/a	Retirement	—N/a
31 Dec 2013	LB	(Slovenia) Matija Škarabot	(Slovenia) Olimpija	Transfer	Free
7 Jan 2014	CB	(Croatia) Ricardo Bagadur	(Croatia) Pomorac	Loan (until 30/6/2014)	—N/a
7 Jan 2014	CF	(Croatia) Filip Dangubić	(Croatia) Pomorac	Loan (until 30/6/2014)	—N/a
7 Jan 2014	CF	(Nigeria) Theophilus Solomon	(Croatia) Pomorac	Loan (until 30/6/2014)	—N/a
14 Jan 2014	AM	(Nigeria) Aliyu Okechukwu	(Croatia) Pomorac	Loan (until 30/6/2014)	—N/a
16 Jan 2014	CB	(Croatia) Niko Datković	(Italy) Spezia	Loan (until 30/6/2014)	—N/a
28 Jan 2014	CF	(Croatia) Danijel Cesarec	(Croatia) Osijek	Loan (until 15/6/2014)	—N/a
24 Feb 2014	CF	(Croatia) Leon Benko	(China) Dalian Aerbin	Transfer	€1 million

Source: Glasilo Hrvatskog nogometnog saveza

Spending: ▼€3,070,000
Income: ▲€1,520,000
Expenditure: ▼€1,550,000
