= 2014 Croatian Football Cup final =

- Event: 2013–14 Croatian Cup
| Dinamo Zagreb | Rijeka |
| 0 | 3 |

First leg
| Dinamo Zagreb | Rijeka |
| 0 | 1 |
- Date: 7 May 2014
- Venue: Stadion Maksimir, Zagreb
- Man of the Match: Ivan Močinić (Rijeka)
- Referee: Zlatko Šimčić (Koprivnica)
- Attendance: 10,324
- Weather: Mostly cloudy 17 °C (63 °F)

Second leg
| Rijeka | Dinamo Zagreb |
| 2 | 0 |
- Date: 13 May 2014
- Venue: Stadion Kantrida, Rijeka
- Man of the Match: Matej Mitrović (Rijeka)
- Referee: Domagoj Ljubičić (Osijek)
- Attendance: 11,000
- Weather: Mostly cloudy 13 °C (55 °F)

The 2014 Croatian Cup final was a two-legged affair played between Dinamo Zagreb and Rijeka. The first leg was played on 7 May 2014 in Zagreb, and the second leg was played on 13 May 2014 in Rijeka.

Rijeka won the trophy with an aggregate result of 3–0. This was the last two-legged final until 2024.

== Road to the final ==
| Dinamo Zagreb | | Round | Rijeka | |
|---|---|---|---|---|
| Opponent | Result | | Opponent | Result |
| Suhopolje | 6–0 | First round | Zmaj Blato | 11–0 |
| Zagora Unešić | 5–0 | Second round | Podravina | 3–1 |
| Hajduk Split | 5–0 | Quarter-finals | Osijek | 1–0 |
| Hajduk Split | 2–1 | Quarter-finals | Osijek | 0–1 (4–2 p) |
| Slaven Belupo | 2–0 | Semi-finals | Istra 1961 | 2–1 |
| Slaven Belupo | 2–1 | Semi-finals | Istra 1961 | 1–0 |

== First leg ==
7 May 2014
18:00

| Dinamo Zagreb | 0–1 | Rijeka |
|---|---|---|
| | Report (in Croatian) | Tomečak 40' |

Stadion Maksimir, Zagreb
Attendance: 10,324
Referee: Zlatko Šimčić (Koprivnica)

| Dinamo Zagreb | Rijeka |

DINAMO ZAGREB:
| GK | 1 | (Croatia) Antonio Ježina |
| DF | 4 | (Croatia) Josip Šimunić (c) | | (substituted off) 60' |
| DF | 5 | (Croatia) Jozo Šimunović | (yellow card) 45' | (substituted off) 89' |
| DF | 6 | (Portugal) Ivo Pinto | (yellow card) 76' |
| DF | 19 | (Croatia) Josip Pivarić |
| MF | 7 | (Croatia) Arijan Ademi |
| MF | 8 | (Croatia) Domagoj Antolić | | (substituted off) 58' |
| MF | 28 | (Croatia) Alen Halilović |
| MF | 77 | (Croatia) Marcelo Brozović |
| FW | 2 | (Algeria) El Arbi Hillel Soudani |
| FW | 90 | (Croatia) Duje Čop | (yellow card) 75' |
Substitutes:
| MF | 16 | (Croatia) Domagoj Pavičić | | (substituted on) 58' |
| DF | 31 | (Croatia) Luka Capan | | (substituted on) 60' |
| MF | 2 | (Bosnia and Herzegovina) Said Husejinović | | (substituted on) 89' |
Manager:
(Croatia) Zoran Mamić

RIJEKA:
| GK | 25 | (Croatia) Ivan Vargić |
| DF | 11 | (Croatia) Ivan Tomečak |
| DF | 13 | (Croatia) Marko Lešković |
| DF | 15 | (Croatia) Matej Mitrović |
| DF | 22 | (Croatia) Marin Leovac | (yellow card) 73' (yellow-red card) 90+3' |
| MF | 16 | (Croatia) Ivan Močinić | (yellow card) 42' |
| MF | 20 | (Bosnia and Herzegovina) Zoran Kvržić | | (substituted off) 56' |
| MF | 30 | (Croatia) Josip Brezovec (c) |
| MF | 88 | (Brazil) Moisés Magalhães | | (substituted off) 72' |
| MF | 89 | (Croatia) Vedran Jugović | | (substituted off) 90' |
| FW | 99 | (Croatia) Ivan Krstanović | (yellow card) 59' |
Substitutes:
| MF | 8 | (Croatia) Goran Mujanović | | (substituted on) 56' |
| MF | 21 | (Bosnia and Herzegovina) Damir Zlomislić | (red card) 85' | (substituted on) 72' |
| DF | 24 | (Croatia) Mateo Bertoša | | (substituted on) 90' |
Manager:
(Slovenia) Matjaž Kek

Assistant referees:
Borut Križarić (Čakovec)
Dražen Fejer (Bjelovar)
Fourth official:
Jerko Crnčić (Vrbovec)
Additional assistant referees:
Igor Križarić (Čakovec)
Mario Zebec (Cestica)

Match rules

- 90 minutes.
- Seven named substitutes.
- Maximum of three substitutions.

== Second leg ==
13 May 2014
20:00

| Rijeka | 2–0 | Dinamo Zagreb |
|---|---|---|
| Mitrović 34'; Kvržić 81' | Report (in Croatian) |

Stadion Kantrida, Rijeka
Attendance: 11,000
Referee: Domagoj Ljubičić (Osijek)

| Rijeka | Dinamo Zagreb |

RIJEKA:
| GK | 25 | (Croatia) Ivan Vargić |
| DF | 11 | (Croatia) Ivan Tomečak |
| DF | 13 | (Croatia) Marko Lešković |
| DF | 15 | (Croatia) Matej Mitrović |
| DF | 22 | (Croatia) Marin Leovac | (yellow card) 40' |
| MF | 16 | (Croatia) Ivan Močinić |
| MF | 20 | (Bosnia and Herzegovina) Zoran Kvržić |
| MF | 30 | (Croatia) Josip Brezovec (c) | (yellow card) 39' |
| MF | 88 | (Brazil) Moisés Magalhães | | (substituted off) 78' |
| MF | 89 | (Croatia) Vedran Jugović | | (substituted off) 84' |
| FW | 91 | (Croatia) Andrej Kramarić | | (substituted off) 90' |
Substitutes:
| MF | 21 | (Bosnia and Herzegovina) Damir Zlomislić | | (substituted on) 78' |
| MF | 8 | (Croatia) Goran Mujanović | | (substituted on) 84' |
| FW | 99 | (Croatia) Anas Sharbini | | (substituted on) 90' |
Manager:
(Slovenia) Matjaž Kek

DINAMO ZAGREB:
| GK | 1 | (Croatia) Antonio Ježina |
| DF | 4 | (Croatia) Josip Šimunić (c) | (yellow card) 14' |
| DF | 6 | (Portugal) Ivo Pinto |
| DF | 19 | (Croatia) Josip Pivarić |
| DF | 31 | (Croatia) Luka Capan | (yellow card) 20' | (substituted off) 46' |
| MF | 7 | (Croatia) Arijan Ademi | (yellow card) 63' |
| MF | 8 | (Croatia) Domagoj Antolić |
| MF | 28 | (Croatia) Alen Halilović |
| MF | 77 | (Croatia) Marcelo Brozović |
| FW | 2 | (Algeria) El Arbi Hillel Soudani |
| FW | 90 | (Croatia) Duje Čop |
Substitutes:
| DF | 28 | (Portugal) Rúben Lima | | (substituted on) 46' |
Manager:
(Croatia) Zoran Mamić

Assistant referees:
Miro Grgić (Osijek)
Goran Pataki (Đakovo)
Fourth official:
Dalibor Conjar (Osijek)
Additional assistant referees:
Ante Vučemilović (Osijek)
Tihomir Pejin (Donji Miholjac)

Match rules

- 90 minutes.
- Penalty shoot-out if scores still level; no extra time.
- Seven named substitutes.
- Maximum of three substitutions.
