= 2013–14 in Croatian football =

Football in Croatia
- Season: 2013–14

Men's football
- Prva HNL: Dinamo Zagreb
- Druga HNL: NK Zagreb
- Croatian Cup: Rijeka
- Supercup: Dinamo Zagreb

The following article presents a summary of the 2013–14 football season in Croatia, which was the 23rd season of competitive football in the country.

== National teams ==
=== Croatia ===
Date	Venue	Opponents	Score	Croatia scorer(s)	Report
2014 FIFA World Cup qualification – Group stage
22 March 2013	Maksimir, Zagreb (H)	Serbia	2–0	Mandžukić, Olić	FIFA.com
26 March 2013	Liberty Stadium, Swansea (A)	Wales	2–1	Lovren, Eduardo	FIFA.com
7 June 2013	Maksimir, Zagreb (H)	Scotland	0–1		FIFA.com
6 September 2013	Red Star Stadium, Belgrade (A)	Serbia	1–1	Mandžukić	FIFA.com
11 October 2013	Maksimir, Zagreb (H)	Belgium	1–2	Kranjčar	FIFA.com
15 October 2013	Hampden Park, Glasgow (A)	Scotland	0–2		FIFA.com
2014 FIFA World Cup qualification – Playoff
15 November 2013	Laugardalsvöllur, Reykjavík (A)	Iceland	0–0		FIFA.com
19 November 2013	Maksimir, Zagreb (H)	Iceland	2–0	Mandžukić, Srna	FIFA.com
2014 FIFA World Cup – Group stage
12 June 2014	Arena Corinthians, São Paulo (A)	Brazil	1–3	Marcelo (o.g.)	FIFA.com
18 June 2014	Arena Amazônia, Manaus (A)	Cameroon	4–0	Mandžukić (2), Olić, Perišić	FIFA.com
23 June 2014	Arena Pernambuco, Recife (H)	Mexico	1–3	Perišić	FIFA.com

=== Croatia U21 ===
Date	Venue	Opponents	Score	Croatia scorer(s)	Report
2015 UEFA European Under-21 Football Championship qualification – Group stage
13 August 2013	Rheinpark Stadion, Vaduz (A)	Liechtenstein	5–0	Brozović (2), Petković, Mišić, Zimmermann (o.g.)	
9 September 2013	Arena Lviv, Lviv (A)	Ukraine	2–0	Rebić, Brozović	
10 October 2013	Stadion Kranjčevićeva, Zagreb (H)	Liechtenstein	4–0	Šitum (2), Brozović, Oršić	
14 October 2013	Cornaredo Stadium, Lugano (A)	Switzerland	2–0	Brozović (2)	
14 November 2013	Stadion Aldo Drosina, Pula (H)	Switzerland	0–2		
19 November 2013	Stadion Aldo Drosina, Pula (H)	Latvia	3–1	Jedvaj, Brozović, Perica	
28 May 2014	Stadion Kranjčevićeva, Zagreb (H)	Ukraine	1–1	Rebić	

=== Croatia U19 ===
Date	Venue	Opponents	Score	Croatia scorer(s)	Report
2014 UEFA European Under-19 Football Championship qualifying round
17 October 2013	Městský stadion, Ostrava (H)	Gibraltar	7–0	Kolar (3), Jedvaj, Pašalić, Mujan, Biljan	
19 October 2013	Stadion v Městských sadech, Opava (H)	Cyprus	2–2	Mujan, Kolar	
22 October 2013	Stadion v Městských sadech, Opava (A)	Czech Republic	0–3		

=== Croatia U17 ===
Date	Venue	Opponents	Score	Croatia scorer(s)	Report
2014 UEFA European Under-17 Football Championship qualifying round
8 October 2013	SRC Slavija, Sarajevo (H)	Montenegro	1–0	Mrkonjić	
10 October 2013	Asim Ferhatović Hase Stadium, Sarajevo (H)	Bosnia and Herzegovina	0–2		
13 October 2013	Asim Ferhatović Hase Stadium, Sarajevo (A)	Portugal	0–1		

== League tables ==
=== Prva HNL ===
Pos	Team	Pld	W	D	L	GF	GA	GD	Pts	Qualification or relegation
1	Dinamo Zagreb (C)	36	26	6	4	83	26	+57	84	Qualification to Champions League second qualifying round
2	Rijeka	36	21	10	5	72	35	+37	73	Qualification to Europa League second qualifying round
3	Hajduk Split	36	17	11	8	58	44	+14	62	Qualification to Europa League second qualifying round
4	RNK Split	36	14	10	12	41	41	0	52	Qualification to Europa League first qualifying round
5	Lokomotiva	36	15	7	14	57	59	−2	52	
6	Istra 1961	36	12	8	16	45	56	−11	44	
7	Zadar	36	10	5	21	35	67	−32	35	
8	Osijek	36	8	9	19	38	62	−24	33	
9	Slaven Belupo (O)	36	7	11	18	46	65	−19	32	Qualification to relegation play-off
10	Hrvatski Dragovoljac (R)	36	7	9	20	41	61	−20	30	Relegation to Croatian Second Football League

Source: Sportnet.hr
Rules for classification: 1) points; 2) goal difference; 3) number of goals scored.
For deciding champions, qualification to UEFA Europa League and relegation: 1st points; 2nd head-to-head points; 3rd head-to-head goal difference; 4th head-to-head away goals scored
(C) Champions; (O) Play-off winners; (R) Relegated

=== Druga HNL ===
Pos	Team	Pld	W	D	L	GF	GA	GD	Pts	Qualification or relegation
1	NK Zagreb (C, P)	33	20	7	6	59	26	+33	67	Promotion to Croatian First Football League
2	Cibalia	33	18	5	10	41	39	+2	59	Qualification to promotion play-off
3	Inter Zaprešić	33	16	5	12	47	32	+15	53	
4	Rudeš	33	14	5	14	45	36	+9	47	
5	Sesvete	33	12	11	10	43	40	+3	47	
6	Segesta	33	13	7	13	40	39	+1	46	
7	Gorica	33	13	6	14	32	33	−1	45	
8	Pomorac	33	10	14	9	24	24	0	44	
9	Lučko	33	10	11	12	34	36	−2	41	
10	Dugopolje	33	10	8	15	37	41	−4	38	
11	Solin (R)	33	7	13	13	26	47	−21	34	Relegation to Croatian Third Football League
12	Zelina (R)	33	4	10	19	22	57	−35	22	Relegation to Croatian Third Football League

Source: Druga-HNL.hr, Sportnet.hr (in Croatian)
Rules for classification: 1st points; 2nd goal difference; 3rd goals scored
For deciding champion, promotion and relegation: 1st points; 2nd head-to-head points; 3rd head-to-head goal difference; 4th head-to-head away goals scored.
(C) Champions; (P) Promoted; (R) Relegated

== Croatian clubs in Europe ==
=== Summary ===
Club	Competition	Starting round	Final round	Matches played
Dinamo Zagreb	UEFA Champions League	2nd qualifying round	Europa League Group Stage	12
Hajduk Split	UEFA Europa League	2nd qualifying round	3rd qualifying round	4
Lokomotiva	UEFA Europa League	2nd qualifying round	2nd qualifying round	2
Rijeka	UEFA Europa League	2nd qualifying round	Europa League Group Stage	12

=== Dinamo Zagreb ===
Date	Venue	Opponents	Score	Dinamo scorer(s)	Report
2013–14 Champions League – Second qualifying round
16 July 2013	Stade Municipal, Differdange (A)	(Luxembourg) Fola Esch	5–0	Soudani (2), Čop, Ademi, Fernandes	
23 July 2013	Stadion Maksimir, Zagreb (H)	(Luxembourg) Fola Esch	1–0	Kramarić	
2013–14 Champions League – Third qualifying round
30 July 2013	Stadion Maksimir, Zagreb (H)	(Moldova) Sheriff Tiraspol	1–0	Rukavina	
7 August 2013	Sheriff Stadium, Tiraspol (A)	(Moldova) Sheriff Tiraspol	3–0	Fernandes, Soudani, Čop	
2013–14 Champions League – Play-off round
21 August 2013	Stadion Maksimir, Zagreb (H)	Austria Wien	0–2		
27 August 2013	Generali Arena (A)	Austria Wien	3–2	Brozović, Fernandes, Bećiraj	
2013–14 Europa League – Group stage					
19 September 2012	Stadion Maksimir, Zagreb (H)	(Ukraine) Chornomorets Odesa	1–2	Fernandes	UEFA.com
3 October 2012	Vasil Levski National Stadium, Sofia (A)	(Bulgaria) Ludogorets Razgrad	0–3		UEFA.com
24 October 2012	Stadion Maksimir, Zagreb (H)	(Netherlands) PSV	0–0		UEFA.com
7 November 2012	Philips Stadion, Eindhoven (A)	(Netherlands) PSV	0–2		UEFA.com
28 November 2012	Chornomorets Stadium, Odesa (A)	(Ukraine) Chornomorets Odesa	1–2	Bećiraj	UEFA.com
12 December 2012	Stadion Maksimir, Zagreb (H)	(Bulgaria) Ludogorets Razgrad	1–2	Čop	UEFA.com

=== Hajduk Split ===
Date	Venue	Opponents	Score	Hajduk scorer(s)	Report
2013–14 Europa League – Second qualifying round
18 July 2013	Stadion Poljud, Split (H)	(North Macedonia) Turnovo	2–1	Bencun, Maloča	
25 July 2013	Philip II Arena, Skopje (A)	(North Macedonia) Turnovo	1–1	Caktaš	
2013–14 Europa League – Third qualifying round
1 August 2013	Stadion Poljud, Split (H)	(Georgia (country)) Dila Gori	0–1		
8 August 2013	Mikheil Meskhi Stadium, Tbilisi (A)	(Georgia (country)) Dila Gori	0–1		

=== Lokomotiva ===
Date	Venue	Opponents	Score	Lokomotiva scorer(s)	Report
2013–14 Europa League – Second qualifying round
18 July 2013	Traktar Stadium, Minsk (A)	(Belarus) Dinamo Minsk	2–1	Šitum, Mišić	
25 July 2013	Stadion Maksimir, Zagreb (H)	(Belarus) Dinamo Minsk	2–3	Mišić, Šitum	

=== Rijeka ===
Date	Venue	Opponents	Score	Rijeka scorer(s)	Report
2013–14 Europa League – Second qualifying round
18 July 2013	Stadion Kantrida, Rijeka (H)	(Wales) Prestatyn Town	5–0	Benko (3), Jugović, Zlomislić	UEFA.com
25 July 2013	Belle Vue, Rhyl (A)	(Wales) Prestatyn Town	3–0	Močinić, Boras, Mujanović	UEFA.com
2013–14 Europa League – Third qualifying round
1 August 2013	Stadion Kantrida, Rijeka (H)	(Slovakia) Žilina	2–1	Sharbini, Kvržić	UEFA.com
8 August 2013	Štadión pod Dubňom, Žilina (A)	(Slovakia) Žilina	1–1	Pokrivač	UEFA.com
2013–14 Europa League – Play-off round
22 August 2013	Stadion Kantrida, Rijeka (H)	(Germany) VfB Stuttgart	2–1	Benko, Kvržić	UEFA.com
8 August 2013	Mercedes-Benz Arena, Stuttgart (A)	(Germany) VfB Stuttgart	2–2	Benko, Mujanović	UEFA.com
2013–14 Europa League – Group stage
19 September 2014	Estádio D. Afonso Henriques, Guimarães (A)	(Portugal) Vitória de Guimarães	0–4		UEFA.com
3 October 2014	Stadion Kantrida, Rijeka (H)	(Spain) Real Betis	1–1	Leon Benko	UEFA.com
24 October 2014	Stade de Gerland, Lyon (A)	(France) Lyon	0–1		UEFA.com
7 November 2014	Stadion Kantrida, Rijeka (H)	(France) Lyon	1–1	Andrej Kramarić	UEFA.com
28 November 2014	Stadion Kantrida, Rijeka (H)	(Portugal) Vitória de Guimarães	0–0		UEFA.com
12 December 2014	Benito Villamarín, Seville (A)	(Spain) Real Betis	0–0		UEFA.com
