= Ricardo Bagadur =

Croatian professional footballer

Personal information
- Date of birth: 16 September 1995 (age 31)
- Place of birth: Rijeka, Croatia
- Height: 1.89 m (6 ft 2 in)
- Position: Centre-back

Team information
- Current team: Opatija
- Number: 15

Youth career
- 2006: Naprijed Hreljin
- 2007–2008: Pomorac
- 2008: Naprijed Hreljin
- 2009: Klana
- 2009–2013: HNK Rijeka
- 2014–2015: Fiorentina

Senior career*
Years	Team	Apps	(Gls)
2013–2014	Rijeka	0	(0)
2014	→ Pomorac (loan)	8	(1)
2014	→ Rijeka II	1	(2)
2014–2017	Fiorentina	1	(0)
2016	→ Salernitana (loan)	10	(2)
2016–2017	→ Benevento (loan)	1	(0)
2017–2018	Brescia	0	(0)
2018	→ FeralpiSalò (loan)	5	(0)
2018–2019	Osijek II	8	(0)
2021–2022	Hrvatski Dragovoljac	31	(2)
2022	Varaždin	7	(1)
2022	Croatia Zmijavci	13	(0)
2023–2024	Leoben	16	(0)
2024–2025	Orijent	40	(0)
2025–	Opatija	27	(2)

International career^{‡}
2013	Croatia U19	7	(0)
2015	Croatia U20	2	(0)
- * Club domestic league appearances and goals as of 17 June 2026 ‡ National team caps and goals as of 4 January 2019

Ricardo Bagadur (born 16 September 1995) is a Croatian professional footballer who plays as a centre-back for Opatija.

== Club career ==
=== Rijeka ===
Bagadur, a product of the club's Academy, only featured once in an official game for HNK Rijeka. His made his official début on 9 October 2013 (age 18) in the club's all-time record win (11–0) over Zmaj Blato in Round 1 of the 2013–14 Croatian Cup, when he replaced the injured defender Luka Marić after 30 minutes. In early 2014, Bagadur was loaned to Pomorac in the 2. HNL. Following his return from loan, he appeared in Rijeka II's season opener in the 3. HNL, when he scored a brace in an away win against Zelina on 30 August 2014.

=== Fiorentina ===
In September 2014, ACF Fiorentina signed Bagadur on a three-year deal for a reported fee of €500,000. Bagadur made his Serie A début on 18 May 2015, in a 3–0 home win against Parma, when he replaced defender Gonzalo Rodríguez after 87 minutes.

=== Salernitana ===
On 13 January 2016, Bagadur was loaned to Salernitana for the remainder of the season.

=== Benevento ===
On 24 August 2016, Bagadur was loaned to Benevento for the remainder of the season.

=== Brescia ===
On 26 July 2017, Brescia signed Bagadur from Fiorentina for an undisclosed fee.

== Career statistics ==
Season	Club	League	League		Cup		Europe		Total	
Season	Club	League	Apps	Goals	Apps	Goals	Apps	Goals	Apps	Goals
2013–14	Rijeka	Prva HNL	0	0	1	0	0	0	1	0
2013–14	Pomorac (loan)	Druga HNL	8	1	–		–		8	1
2014–15	Rijeka	Prva HNL	0	0	–		–		0	0
2014–15	Rijeka II	3. HNL West	1	2	–		–		1	2
2014–15	Fiorentina	Serie A	1	0	0	0	0	0	1	0
2015–16	Fiorentina	Serie A	0	0	–		0	0	0	0
2015–16	Salernitana (loan)	Serie B	10	2	0	0	–		10	2
2016–17	Fiorentina	Serie A	0	0	–		0	0	0	0
2016–17	Benevento (loan)	Serie B	1	0	–		–		1	0
2017–18	Brescia	Serie B	0	0	–		–		0	0
2017–18	FeralpiSalò (loan)	Serie C	5	0	–		–		5	0
2018–19	Osijek II	Druga HNL	8	0	–		–		8	0
Career total			34	5	1	0	0	0	35	5
Last Update: 16 March 2019.

== Honours ==
HNK Rijeka

- Croatian Super Cup: 2014
