= Mate Maleš =

Croatian footballer (born 1989)

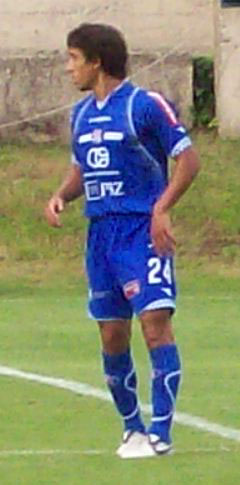
- Maleš with Dinamo Zagreb in 2008

Personal information
- Date of birth: 11 March 1989 (age 37)
- Place of birth: Šibenik, SR Croatia, SFR Yugoslavia
- Height: 1.86 m (6 ft 1 in)
- Position: Midfielder

Team information
- Current team: Rijeka (assistant coach)

Youth career
- 1999–2007: Šibenik
- 2007–2008: Hajduk Split

Senior career*
| Years | Team | Apps | (Gls) |
| 2006–2007 | Šibenik | 1 | (0) |
| 2008 | Dinamo Zagreb | 1 | (0) |
| 2008–2013 | Lokomotiva | 66 | (0) |
| 2011–2012 | → NK Zagreb (loan) | 21 | (0) |
| 2013–2018 | Rijeka | 90 | (2) |
| 2018–2019 | CFR Cluj | 8 | (0) |
| 2019–2020 | Sarpsborg 08 | 1 | (0) |
| 2020–2021 | Arezzo | 5 | (0) |
| 2021–2023 | Lokomotiva | 27 | (1) |

International career^{‡}
| 2007 | Croatia U18 | 3 | (0) |
| 2006–2007 | Croatia U19 | 4 | (0) |
| 2008 | Croatia U20 | 1 | (0) |
| 2014 | Croatia | 1 | (0) |

Managerial career
- 2025–2026: Lokomotiva (assistant)
- 2026–: Rijeka (assistant)
- * Club domestic league appearances and goals as of 23 January 2021 ‡ National team caps and goals as of 3 November 2015

Mate Maleš (Croatian pronunciation: [mǎːte mâːleʃ]; born 11 March 1989) is a Croatian football manager and former player who is currently an assistant coach of Croatian Football League club Rijeka.

== Club career ==
Maleš started his football career with HNK Šibenik, debuting for the first team at the age of 17, on 4 August 2006 against Dinamo Zagreb. His teammates in HNK Šibenik included Ante Rukavina and Gordon Schildenfeld.

In 2007, Hajduk Split acquired Maleš and introduced him to their youth system. He was set to sign his first professional contract in February 2008, after a tournament in Hong Kong in which he played for the first team. Instead, he opted to sign a five-year deal with Dinamo Zagreb. After only two matches for his new team in the early stages of the 2008–09 season, he was loaned to Lokomotiva. In the summer of 2010, his contract with Dinamo was cancelled and Maleš signed a three-year contract with Lokomotiva. He spent one of these three seasons on loan with NK Zagreb.

=== Rijeka ===
In June 2013, Maleš signed a two-year deal with HNK Rijeka. He was a regular starter during his first season with the club. However, following a serious ankle injury, he had to undergo two surgeries, followed by long recovery periods. As a consequence, he did not play a single match from 26 March 2014 until 2 August 2015, in process missing the entire 2014–15 season, with the exception of one Rijeka II appearance in 3. HNL. Nevertheless, in May 2015, Rijeka renewed his contract for two years, tying him to the club until June 2017. Maleš scored his first ever Prva HNL goal in Rijeka's 2–1 away win against Lokomotiva on 17 October 2015. From the start of the 2016–17 season and until his departure in February 2018 Maleš served as the team captain.

Maleš was signed by Chinese Super League newcomer Dalian Yifang in February 2018. However, after Wanda Group took charge of the club at the end of February 2018 and bought Nicolás Gaitán and Yannick Carrasco from Atlético Madrid, he was excluded from the squad due to the limitation of the numbers of foreign players.

=== CFR Cluj ===
On 20 June 2018, Maleš signed a contract with Romanian defending champions CFR Cluj.

=== Sarpsborg 08 ===
On 30 July 2019, Maleš signed for Sarpsborg 08 on a contract until the end of the 2020 season. On 15 August 2019 Maleš' contract was extended until the end of the 2021 season.

=== Arezzo ===
On 17 September 2020, he moved to Italian Serie C club Arezzo. On 29 January 2021, his contract was terminated by mutual consent.

== International career ==
In 2006, Mate Maleš was selected for the national under-21 team, but despite being a regular U19 player, he never got a cap for the U21s. However, he has been called up to the Croatia squad and was in the squad for the 2014 World Cup Qualifying match against Iceland, on 19 November 2013.

He made his international debut on 5 March 2014, aged 24, in a friendly away match against Switzerland, where he was in the starting line-up and eventually replaced by Luka Modrić in 56th minute. The match ended in a 2–2 draw. He missed the 2014 FIFA World Cup due to injury.

== Managerial career ==
From 2023 to 2026, Maleš worked as an assistant to Nikica Jelavić at Lokomotiva, first with the under-19 team and later with the senior team.

On 13 June 2026, he returned to Rijeka as an assistant coach to Matjaž Kek, who had previously coached him.

== Career statistics ==
| Season | Club | League | League | | Cup | | Europe | | Total | |
| Season | Club | League | Apps | Goals | Apps | Goals | Apps | Goals | Apps | Goals |
|---|---|---|---|---|---|---|---|---|---|---|
| 2006–07 | Šibenik | 1. HNL | 1 | 0 | – | | – | | 1 | 0 |
| 2007–08 | Hajduk Split | 1. HNL | – | | – | | – | | 0 | 0 |
| 2008–09 | Dinamo Zagreb | 1. HNL | 1 | 0 | – | | 1 | 0 | 2 | 0 |
| 2008–09 | Lokomotiva | 2. HNL | 15 | 0 | – | | – | | 15 | 0 |
| 2009–10 | Lokomotiva | 1. HNL | 11 | 0 | – | | – | | 11 | 0 |
| 2010–11 | Lokomotiva | 1. HNL | 17 | 0 | 2 | 0 | – | | 19 | 0 |
| 2011–12 | Lokomotiva | 1. HNL | 2 | 0 | – | | – | | 2 | 0 |
| 2011–12 | NK Zagreb | 1. HNL | 21 | 0 | 5 | 0 | – | | 26 | 0 |
| 2012–13 | Lokomotiva | 1. HNL | 21 | 0 | 8 | 2 | – | | 29 | 2 |
| Lokomotiva total | | | 66 | 0 | 10 | 2 | 0 | 0 | 76 | 2 |
| 2013–14 | Rijeka | 1. HNL | 22 | 0 | 3 | 0 | 12 | 0 | 37 | 0 |
| 2014–15 | Rijeka | 1. HNL | – | | – | | – | | 0 | 0 |
| 2015–16 | Rijeka | 1. HNL | 28 | 1 | 3 | 0 | – | | 31 | 1 |
| 2016–17 | Rijeka | 1. HNL | 25 | 1 | 4 | 1 | 2 | 0 | 31 | 2 |
| 2017–18 | Rijeka | 1. HNL | 15 | 0 | 3 | 0 | 10 | 0 | 28 | 0 |
| Rijeka total | | | 90 | 2 | 13 | 1 | 24 | 0 | 127 | 3 |
| Career total | | | 179 | 2 | 28 | 3 | 25 | 0 | 232 | 5 |
Last Update: 17 December 2017.

== Honours ==
=== Club ===
Rijeka

- Croatian First Football League: 2016–17
- Croatian Football Cup: 2013–14, 2016–17

CFR Cluj

- Liga I: 2018–19
- Supercupa României: 2018
