= Alojz Bajc =

Yugoslav cyclist (1932–2025)

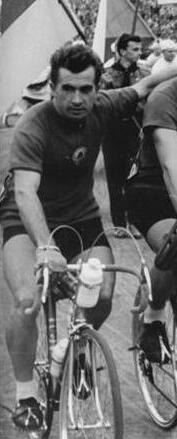
- Bajc in 1961

Personal information
- Born: 20 April 1932 Duplje, Italy (now Slovenia)
- Died: 1 November 2025 (aged 93)

Cycling career
- Sport: Cycling

Alojz Bajc (20 April 1932 – 1 November 2025) was a Yugoslav cyclist. He competed in the individual road race at the 1960 Summer Olympics.

Bajc died on 1 November 2025, at the age of 93.
