= Mateo Bertoša =

Croatian footballer

Personal information
- Date of birth: 10 August 1988 (age 38)
- Place of birth: Koper, SR Slovenia, SFR Yugoslavia
- Height: 1.85 m (6 ft 1 in)
- Position: Left-back

Team information
- Current team: Opatija
- Number: 19

Youth career
- –2003: Jadran Poreč
- 2003–2007: Rijeka

Senior career*
Years	Team	Apps	(Gls)
2006–2008	Rijeka	1	(0)
2008–2009	Jadran Poreč	32	(1)
2009–2011	Ergotelis	2	(0)
2011–2013	Široki Brijeg	47	(0)
2013–2016	Rijeka	33	(0)
2014–2016	→ Rijeka II	17	(2)
2016–2017	Istra 1961	25	(1)
2018	Pro Vercelli 1892	0	(0)
2018	Al-Quwa		
2019–	Opatija	39	(1)
- * Club domestic league appearances and goals as of 4 June 2022

Mateo Bertoša (born 10 August 1988) is a Croatian footballer who plays as a left-back for Opatija.

== Career ==
Bertoša made one Croatian Prva HNL appearance for HNK Rijeka before joining NK Jadran Poreč. He then had a short stint with Ergotelis in Greece before moving to NK Široki Brijeg. In 2013, he returned to Rijeka.

On 20 September 2018, Bertoša joined Al-Quwa Al-Jawiya in Iraq. He left the club in 2019, and on 4 April, he then joined NK Opatija.

== Career statistics ==
Club performance			League		Cup		Continental		Total	
Season	Club	League	Apps	Goals	Apps	Goals	Apps	Goals	Apps	Goals
Croatia			League		Croatian Cup		Europe		Total	
2006–07	HNK Rijeka	Prva HNL	1	0	0	0	–	–	1	0
2007–08	HNK Rijeka	Prva HNL	0	0	0	0	–	–	0	0
2008–09	Jadran Poreč	Treća HNL (West)	32	1	-	-	–	–	32	1
Greece			League		Croatian Cup		Europe		Total	
2009–10	Ergotelis	Super League Greece	2	0	1	0	–	–	3	0
2010–11	Ergotelis	Super League Greece	0	0	0	0	–	–	0	0
Bosnia and Herzegovina			League		BIH Cup		Europe		Total	
2011–12	Široki Brijeg	Premier League of Bosnia and Herzegovina	25	1	0	0	2	0	27	1
2012–13	Široki Brijeg	Premier League of Bosnia and Herzegovina	15	1	0	0	2	1	16	1
Croatia			League		Croatian Cup		Europe		Total	
2013–14	HNK Rijeka	Prva HNL	19	0	6	0	7	0	32	0
2014–15	HNK Rijeka	Prva HNL	9	0	1	1	1	0	11	1
2015–16	HNK Rijeka	Prva HNL	5	0	1	1	0	0	6	0
2016–17	NK Istra 1961	Prva HNL	10	1	1	0	-	-	11	1
2017–18	NK Istra 1961	Prva HNL	15	0	1	0	-	-	16	0
Italy			League		Coppa Italia		Europe		Total	
2017–18	Pro Vercelli 1892	Serie B	0	0	-	-	-	-	0	0
Croatia			League		Croatian Cup		Europe		Total	
2018–19	NK Opatija	Treća HNL (West)	0	0	-	-	-	-	0	0
Total			133	4	11	2	12	1	156	7

== Honours ==
Široki Brijeg

- Bosnia and Herzegovina Cup: 2013

HNK Rijeka

- Croatian Cup: 2014
