= Damir Zlomislić =

Bosnian footballer (born 1991)

Personal information
- Date of birth: 20 July 1991 (age 35)
- Place of birth: Konjic, SFR Yugoslavia
- Height: 1.93 m (6 ft 4 in)
- Position: Midfielder

Youth career
- –2010: Široki Brijeg

Senior career*
Years	Team	Apps	(Gls)
2010–2013	Široki Brijeg	24	(1)
2010	→ GOŠK Gabela (loan)		
2011	→ Vlašim (loan)	13	(0)
2011–2012	→ GOŠK Gabela (loan)	27	(4)
2013–2016	Rijeka	19	(0)
2014	→ Rijeka II	1	(0)
2015	→ Brașov (loan)	14	(0)
2015–2016	→ Istra 1961 (loan)	30	(1)
2016–2017	Gaziantep BB	6	(0)
2017	Široki Brijeg	10	(2)
2017	Shakhtyor Soligorsk	13	(0)
2018	Široki Brijeg	7	(0)
2018–2019	Vojvodina	17	(0)
2019–2024	Zrinjski Mostar	106	(3)
2024–2026	Široki Brijeg	14	(1)

International career
2009–2010	Bosnia and Herzegovina U19	12	(0)
- * Club domestic league appearances and goals as of 12 June 2026

Damir Zlomislić (born 20 July 1991) is a Bosnian professional footballer who plays as a midfielder.

== Club career ==
Zlomislić signed for Rijeka in mid-2013, and collected 19 league appearances. He also earned nine caps for Rijeka in the UEFA Europa League, scoring one goal. His first season with the club was interrupted by a long-term knee injury, which sidelined him from August 2013 until March 2014.

Given that he was a starter in only three league games in the first half of the 2014–15 season, in February 2015 Zlomislić was loaned to Brașov in Romania's Liga I for the remainder of the season. In July 2015, he was once again loaned, this time to Istra 1961 for the duration of the 2015–16 season. On 22 August 2015, he scored his first Prva HNL goal in Round 7 home match against Dinamo Zagreb.

On 3 July 2016, it was announced that Zlomislić signed for Gaziantep Büyükşehir Belediyespor in Turkey.

On 5 July 2018, Zlomislić signed a two-year deal with Vojvodina.

In July 2019, Zrinjski Mostar announced they have reached an agreement with Zlomislić. He made his official debut for Zrinjski on 28 July 2019, in a 1–0 home league win against Velež Mostar in the Mostar derby. Zlomislić scored his first goal for Zrinjski in a league match against Krupa on 28 September 2020.

== Honours ==
Široki Brijeg

- Bosnian Cup: 2012–13, 2016–17

Rijeka

- Croatian Cup: 2013–14
- Croatian Super Cup: 2014

Zrinjski Mostar

- Bosnian Premier League: 2021–22, 2022–23
- Bosnian Cup: 2022–23, 2023–24
