= Moisés (footballer, born 1988) =

Brazilian footballer

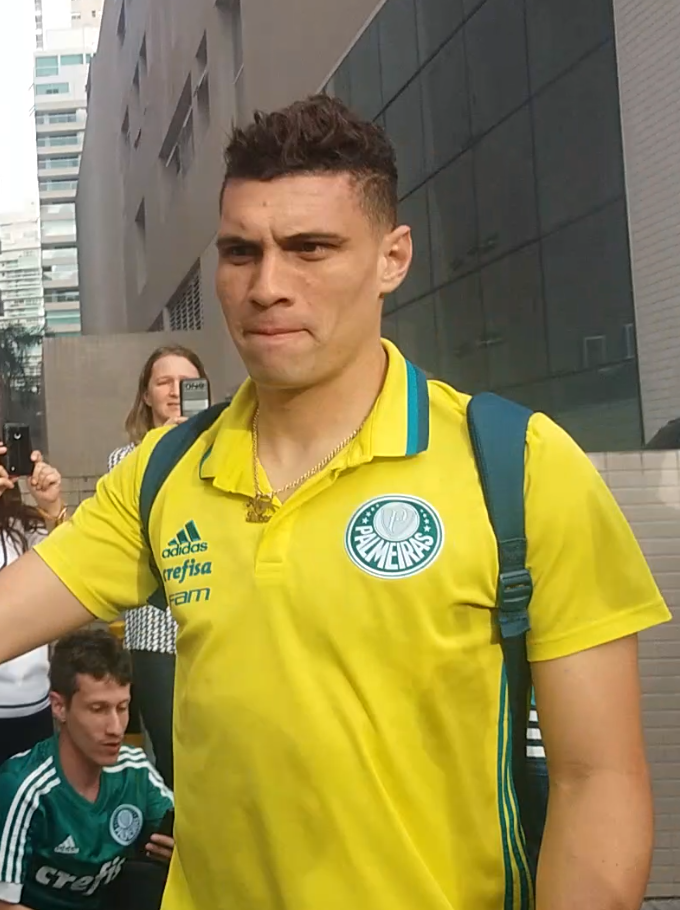
- Moisés with Palmeiras in 2016

Personal information
- Full name: Moisés Lima Magalhães
- Date of birth: 7 March 1988 (age 38)
- Place of birth: Belo Horizonte, Brazil
- Height: 1.84 m (6 ft 0 in)
- Position: Midfielder

Youth career
- América Mineiro

Senior career*
Years	Team	Apps	(Gls)
2007–2012	América Mineiro	13	(3)
2007	→ Império Toledo (loan)	0	(0)
2008	→ Rioverdense (loan)	0	(0)
2009	→ Coritiba (loan)	0	(0)
2010	→ Sport (loan)	13	(1)
2011	→ Boa Esporte (loan)	26	(4)
2012–2013	Portuguesa	65	(8)
2014–2015	Rijeka	41	(7)
2016–2019	Palmeiras	90	(8)
2019–2023	Shandong Taishan	90	(24)
2024	América Mineiro	30	(3)
Total		368	(58)
- * Club domestic league appearances and goals

Moisés Lima Magalhães (born 17 March 1988), simply known as Moisés, is a Brazilian former professional footballer who played as a midfielder.

== Career ==
=== América Mineiro ===
Born in Belo Horizonte, Moisés began his career with his hometown's América Mineiro, and was loaned to a host of clubs before being given his chance to impress at his parent club in the 2009 league season when he made his debut in a state league game on 25 January 2009 against Atlético Mineiro in a 0-0 draw. Within the season he went on to establish himself as vital player that helped win the 2009 Campeonato Brasileiro Série C title and promotion into the second tier. The following seasons he would be loaned to second tier clubs Sport Recife and then Boa Esporte, where he had a personally productive period immediately establishing himself within the team and narrowly missing out on promotion with them.

=== Portuguesa ===
In May 2012, he signed a contract with top tier club Portuguesa. On 6 June 2012, he made his Série A debut, against Coritiba in a 2-0 defeat. Four days later, Moisés scored his first top flight goal, against Atlético-GO in a 2-0 victory. Throughout the season he would be an integral member of the team that helped them avoid relegation, however the following season would see the club relegated despite actually improving upon the previous campaigns results after they were deducted four points for selecting a suspended player.

=== Rijeka ===
On 11 January 2014 Moisés signed with Prva HNL side Rijeka, initially on a loan, but the club decided to activate the clause to buy that summer, and he was signed for the following two seasons. Moisés made his first official appearance for Rijeka in a league game on 16 February 2014 against NK Zadar away from home in a 1-0 defeat. On 7 March 2014 he would score his first goal for the club in a league game against NK Hrvatski Dragovoljac in a 1-0 away victory. He would go on win the 2013–14 Croatian Football Cup against Dinamo Zagreb and 2014 Croatian Football Super Cup.

=== Palmeiras ===
In December 2015 signed a contract with top tier club Palmeiras, for four seasons. He would make his debut in a state league game on 13 February 2016 against Linense that ended in a 2-1 defeat. He would go on to make his first league appearance on 14 May 2016 against Paranaense in a 4-0 victory. He would go on to establish himself as a vital member within their team and helped win them the 2016 Campeonato Brasileiro Série A title. The following season on 19 February 2017 in a state league game against Linense that was won 4-0 saw Moisés miss six months of the season after he sustained a serious injury to his left knee within the game. On his return he would gradually once more establish himself within the team and in the following season he would once again be a vital member of the team that won the 2018 Campeonato Brasileiro Série A title.

=== Shandong Taishan ===
In July 2019, Moisés signed with top tier Chinese club Shandong Luneng Taishan (later renamed to Shandong Taishan). He made his debut for the club on 3 August 2019 in a league game against Guangzhou Evergrande Taobao that ended in a 3-0 defeat. After the game he would go on to establish himself as a regular within the team and was part of the squad that won the 2020 Chinese FA Cup against Jiangsu Suning F.C. in a 2-0 victory. The following season he would gain his first league title with the club when he was part of the team that won the 2021 Chinese Super League title. The next season he would go on to win another Chinese FA Cup with the 2022 Chinese FA Cup.

=== Return to América Mineiro ===
On 15 December 2023, Moisés returned to América Mineiro.

== Personal life ==
Moisés' younger brother, Matheus, is also a footballer. A goalkeeper, he too started his career at América Mineiro, but spent most of his career at Portugal's S.C. Braga.

== Career statistics ==
Appearances and goals by club, season and competition
Club	Season	League			State League		Cup		Continental		Other		Total	
Club	Season	Division	Apps	Goals	Apps	Goals	Apps	Goals	Apps	Goals	Apps	Goals	Apps	Goals
América Mineiro	2009	Série C	13	3	11	0	–		–		–		24	3
América Mineiro	2010	Série B	0	0	10	1	–		–		–		10	1
América Mineiro	2011	Série A	0	0	5	0	–		–		–		5	0
América Mineiro	2012	Série B	0	0	13	0	3	1	–		–		16	1
América Mineiro	Total		13	3	39	1	3	1	0	0	0	0	55	5
Coritiba (loan)	2009	Série A	0	0	0	0	–		–		–		0	0
Sport Recife (loan)	2010	Série B	13	1	0	0	–		–		–		13	1
Boa Esporte (loan)	2011	Série B	26	4	0	0	–		–		–		26	4
Portuguesa	2012	Série A	34	6	0	0	0	0	–		–		34	6
Portuguesa	2013	Série A	31	2	21	2	1	0	0	0	–		53	3
Portuguesa	Total		65	8	21	2	1	0	0	0	0	0	87	10
Rijeka	2013–14	1. HNL	15	1	–		6	1	–		–		21	2
Rijeka	2014–15	1. HNL	12	5	–		0	0	9	2	1 (Note: Appearances in Croatian Football Super Cup)	1	22	8
Rijeka	2015–16	1. HNL	14	1	–		3	1	2	0	–		19	2
Rijeka	Total		41	7	0	0	9	2	11	2	1	1	62	12
Palmeiras	2016	Série A	34	3	1	0	2	0	0	0	–		37	3
Palmeiras	2017	Série A	19	3	2	0	0	0	1	0	–		22	3
Palmeiras	2018	Série A	28	2	9	0	4	0	10	0	–		51	2
Palmeiras	2019	Série A	9	0	7	0	0	0	4	1	–		20	1
Palmeiras	Total		90	8	19	0	6	0	15	1	0	0	130	9
Shandong Taishan	2019	Chinese Super League	8	1	–		2	0	-		–		10	1
Shandong Taishan	2020	Chinese Super League	20	4	–		5	1	-		–		25	5
Shandong Taishan	2021	Chinese Super League	6	1	–		6	0	-		–		12	1
Shandong Taishan	2022	Chinese Super League	31	13	–		5	3	0	0	–		36	16
Shandong Taishan	2023	Chinese Super League	25	5	–		4	2	5	3	1 (Note: Appearances in Chinese Super Cup)	0	35	10
Shandong Taishan	Total		90	24	0	0	22	6	5	3	1	0	118	33
América Mineiro	2024	Série B	30	3	9	0	1	0	–		–		40	3
Career total			368	58	88	3	42	9	31	6	2	1	541	77

== Honours ==
América Mineiro

- Campeonato Brasileiro Série C: 2009

Portuguesa

- Campeonato Paulista Série A2: 2013

Rijeka

- Croatian Football Cup: 2013–14
- Croatian Football Super Cup: 2014

Palmeiras

- Campeonato Brasileiro Série A: 2016, 2018

Shandong Taishan

- Chinese FA Cup Best player: 2022
- Chinese Super League: 2021
- Chinese FA Cup: 2020, 2021, 2022

Individual

- Bola de Prata: 2016
- Campeonato Brasileiro Série A Team of the Year: 2016
- Best Attacking Midfielder in Brazil: 2016, 2017
