= La Cala Resort =

Residential and recreational estate

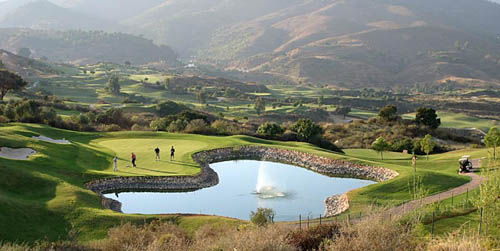
- 16th green, Campo America
- Interactive map of La Cala Resort
- 36°32′11″N 4°43′4″W

Club information
- Location: Mijas, Andalucía, Spain
- Established: 1989
- Type: Private
- Owner: FBD Holdings plc.
- Tota holes: 60
- Website: www.lacala.com

Campo America
- Designed by: Cabell Robinson
- Par: 72
- Length: 5,987 metres
- Course rating: 71.7, 133

Campo Asia
- Designed by: Cabell Robinson
- Par: 72
- Length: 5,925 metres
- Course rating: 72.1, 137

Campo Europa
- Designed by: Cabell Robinson
- Par: 71
- Length: 6,014
- Course rating: 71.7, 136

La Cala Resort is a residential and recreational estate in Mijas, Andalucía, southern Spain. Located between Marbella and Fuengirola, La Cala is home to four golf courses, three 18 hole championship golf courses and a nine-hole Par 3 course, and a golf academy. It is recognised by the Royal Spanish Golf Federation as the largest golf complex in the country. Other facilities include a luxury hotel, on-site apartments and villas, and a separate clubhouse.

The resort's three 18-hole courses were designed by Cabell B. Robinson, and are named Campo América, Campo Asia and Campo Europa. The complex has staged numerous competitions such as the Ladies European Tour qualifying school and the Spanish Pairs final, won by Miguel Ángel Jiménez and Andrés Jiménez. In September 2008 the resort hosted the Ladbrokescasino.com Masters. In July 2007 La Cala set a Guinness World Record for the largest number of golfers to compete in a one-day event in a resort, when 614 people played in a competition held to raise funds for UNICEF.

The main shareholder in the resort is the Irish insurance company FBD Holdings.
