= 2014 Croatian Football Super Cup =

Rijeka	Dinamo Zagreb
2	1
- Date: 11 July 2014
- Venue: Stadion Kantrida, Rijeka
- Man of the Match: Miral Samardžić (Rijeka)
- Referee: Zlatko Šimčić (Koprivnica)
- Attendance: 8,000
- Weather: Cloudy; 22 °C (72 °F)

The 2014 Croatian Football Super Cup was the eleventh edition of Croatian Football Super Cup, a football match contested by the winners of the Croatian First League and Croatian Football Cup competitions. The match was played on 11 July 2014 at Stadion Kantrida in Rijeka between 2013–14 Croatian First League winners Dinamo Zagreb and 2013–14 Croatian Football Cup winners Rijeka.

== Match details ==
11 July 2014
20:30

Rijeka	2–1	Dinamo Zagreb
Samardžić 11'; Moisés 69'	Report (in Croatian)	Sigali 38'

Stadion Kantrida, Rijeka
Attendance: 8,000
Referee: Zlatko Šimčić (Koprivnica)

Rijeka	Dinamo Zagreb

RIJEKA:
GK	25	(Croatia) Ivan Vargić
DF	11	(Croatia) Ivan Tomečak
DF	22	(Croatia) Marin Leovac
DF	15	(Croatia) Matej Mitrović	(yellow card) 38'
DF	19	(Slovenia) Miral Samardžić
MF	30	(Croatia) Josip Brezovec
MF	89	(Croatia) Vedran Jugović
MF	8	(Croatia) Mato Jajalo		(substituted off) 68'
MF	10	(Croatia) Anas Sharbini (c)		(substituted off) 50'
FW	88	(Brazil) Moisés
FW	99	(Croatia) Ivan Krstanović	(yellow card) 87'
Substitutes:
MF	20	(Bosnia and Herzegovina) Zoran Kvržić		(substituted on) 50'
FW	91	(Croatia) Andrej Kramarić		(substituted on) 68'
Manager:
(Slovenia) Matjaž Kek

DINAMO ZAGREB:
GK	34	(Portugal) Eduardo Carvalho
DF	27	(Croatia) Jerko Leko	(yellow card) 11'
DF	4	(Croatia) Josip Šimunić (c)
DF	19	(Croatia) Josip Pivarić
DF	22	(Argentina) Leonardo Sigali
MF	8	(Croatia) Domagoj Antolić
MF	23	(Portugal) Gonçalo Santos		(substituted off) 46'
MF	16	(North Macedonia) Arijan Ademi	(yellow card) 31'
MF	20	(Croatia) Marko Pjaca	(yellow card) 51'	(substituted off) 61'
MF	10	(Portugal) Paulo Machado
FW	90	(Croatia) Duje Čop
Substitutes:
MF	77	(Croatia) Marcelo Brozović		(substituted on) 46'
FW	15	(Croatia) Dejan Radonjić	(yellow card) 90+3'	(substituted on) 61'
Manager:
(Croatia) Zoran Mamić

Assistant referees:
Dalibor Conjar (Osijek)
Miro Grgić (Osijek)
Fourth official:
Tihomir Pejin (Donji Miholjac)

Match rules

- 90 minutes.
- Penalty shoot-out if scores still level; no extra time.
- Seven named substitutes.
- Maximum of three substitutions.
