= Igor Lovrić =

Croatian footballer (born 1987)

Personal information
- Full name: Igor Lovrić
- Date of birth: 7 October 1987 (age 39)
- Place of birth: Pula, Croatia
- Height: 1.97 m (6 ft 6 in)
- Position: Goalkeeper

Team information
- Current team: Mladost Fazana

Youth career
- Istra 1961

Senior career*
Years	Team	Apps	(Gls)
2006–2007	Istra 1961	0	(0)
2007	Žminj	12	(0)
2008–2010	Istra 1961	9	(0)
2010–2011	Karlovac	23	(0)
2012–2013	Lokomotiva	11	(0)
2014–2015	Istra 1961	14	(0)
2015–2017	Hrvatski Dragovoljac	27	(0)
2017–2018	NK Zagreb	12	(0)
2018	Opatija	8	(0)
2019-	Mladost Fazana		
- * Club domestic league appearances and goals as of 21 April 2018

Igor Lovrić (born 7 October 1987) is a Croatian footballer playing as a goalkeeper, who played for NK Opatija.

== Club career ==
=== Istra 1961 ===
A product of the youth academy he made his debut for the team in 1–0 loss against Inter Zapresic. He played 7 league matches for this club.

=== Karlovac ===
He joined Karlovac in a free transfer. Lovric was made the 2nd choice goalkeeper at Karlovac. His debut for league was against Hajduk Split in a 6–1 defeat. He was substituted in the 46th minute for conceding 5 goals

=== Lokomotiva ===
On 25 January 2012, he joined Lokomotiva on a free transfer.

== Club statistics ==
As of 3 April 2013

Team	Appearances	CS	Avg
Istra 1961	7	3	0.43
Karlovac	23	9	0.39
Lokomotiva	11	4	0.36
Total	41	16	0.39
