= Ivan Krstanović =

Bosnia and Herzegovina footballer

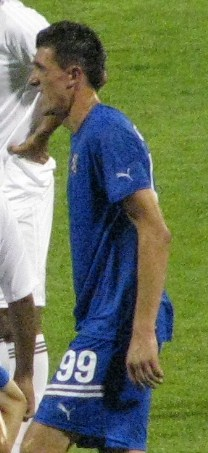
- Krstanović with Dinamo Zagreb in 2011

Personal information
- Date of birth: 5 January 1983 (age 43)
- Place of birth: Tomislavgrad, SR Bosnia and Herzegovina, Yugoslavia
- Height: 1.96 m (6 ft 5 in)
- Position: Striker

Youth career
- Tomislav

Senior career*
| Years | Team | Apps | (Gls) |
| 2000–2004 | Tomislav | | |
| 2004–2006 | Drinovci | | |
| 2006–2008 | Posušje | 41 | (19) |
| 2008–2011 | Zagreb | 82 | (31) |
| 2011–2013 | Dinamo Zagreb | 44 | (17) |
| 2013–2015 | Rijeka | 35 | (16) |
| 2015 | Zadar | 12 | (6) |
| 2015–2017 | Široki Brijeg | 48 | (16) |
| 2017–2019 | Lokomotiva | 41 | (11) |
| 2019–2023 | Slaven Belupo | 132 | (42) |
| 2024 | Karlovac 1919 | 11 | (3) |
- * Club domestic league appearances and goals as of 24 May 2024

Ivan Krstanović (born 5 January 1983) is a retired Bosnian professional footballer who played as a striker. He became known in Croatia when he became the top scorer of the Croatian Football League in the 2010–11 season with 19 goals.

== Career statistics ==
=== Club ===
As of match played 24 May 2024

| Season | Club | League | League | | Cup | | Europe | | Total | |
| Season | Club | League | Apps | Goals | Apps | Goals | Apps | Goals | Apps | Goals |
|---|---|---|---|---|---|---|---|---|---|---|
| 2006–07 | Posušje | Premijer Liga | 14 | 5 | – | | – | | 14 | 5 |
| 2007–08 | Posušje | Premijer Liga | 27 | 14 | 7 | 6 | – | | 34 | 20 |
| Total | | | 41 | 19 | 7 | 6 | 0 | 0 | 48 | 25 |
| 2008–09 | NK Zagreb | Prva HNL | 30 | 8 | 6 | 2 | – | | 36 | 10 |
| 2009–10 | NK Zagreb | Prva HNL | 24 | 4 | 4 | 1 | – | | 28 | 5 |
| 2010–11 | NK Zagreb | Prva HNL | 28 | 19 | 4 | 1 | – | | 32 | 20 |
| Total | | | 82 | 31 | 14 | 4 | 0 | 0 | 96 | 35 |
| 2011–12 | Dinamo Zagreb | Prva HNL | 22 | 10 | 7 | 2 | 6 | 2 | 35 | 14 |
| 2012–13 | Dinamo Zagreb | Prva HNL | 22 | 7 | 2 | 2 | 3 | 1 | 27 | 10 |
| total | | | 44 | 17 | 9 | 4 | 9 | 3 | 62 | 24 |
| 2013–14 | Rijeka | Prva HNL | 24 | 14 | 5 | 1 | 8 | 0 | 37 | 15 |
| 2014–15 | Rijeka | Prva HNL | 11 | 2 | 3 | 1 | 7 | 2 | 21 | 5 |
| Total | | | 35 | 16 | 8 | 2 | 15 | 2 | 58 | 20 |
| 2014–15 | Zadar | Prva HNL | 12 | 6 | 1 | 0 | – | | 13 | 6 |
| 2015–16 | Široki Brijeg | Premijer Liga | 19 | 11 | 4 | 1 | – | | 23 | 12 |
| 2016–17 | Široki Brijeg | Premijer Liga | 25 | 2 | 6 | 3 | 2 | 0 | 33 | 5 |
| 2017–18 | Široki Brijeg | Premijer Liga | 4 | 3 | – | | 4 | 2 | 8 | 5 |
| Total | | | 48 | 16 | 10 | 4 | 6 | 2 | 64 | 22 |
| 2017–18 | Lokomotiva | Prva HNL | 26 | 5 | 2 | 0 | – | | 28 | 5 |
| 2018–19 | Lokomotiva | Prva HNL | 15 | 6 | 3 | 1 | – | | 18 | 7 |
| Total | | | 41 | 11 | 5 | 1 | 0 | 0 | 46 | 12 |
| 2018–19 | Slaven Belupo | Prva HNL | 10 | 7 | – | | – | | 10 | 7 |
| 2019–20 | Slaven Belupo | Prva HNL | 33 | 12 | 3 | 1 | – | | 36 | 13 |
| 2020–21 | Slaven Belupo | Prva HNL | 29 | 8 | 2 | 1 | – | | 31 | 9 |
| 2021–22 | Slaven Belupo | Prva HNL | 28 | 10 | 3 | 2 | – | | 31 | 12 |
| 2022–23 | Slaven Belupo | Prva HNL | 32 | 5 | 3 | 1 | – | | 35 | 6 |
| Total | | | 132 | 42 | 11 | 5 | 0 | 0 | 143 | 47 |
| 2023–24 | Karlovac 1919 | 2. NL | 11 | 3 | – | | – | | 11 | 3 |
| Career total | | | 446 | 161 | 65 | 27 | 30 | 7 | 541 | 195 |

== Honours ==
=== Club ===
Dinamo Zagreb

- Croatian First Football League: 2011–12, 2012–13
- Croatian Cup: 2011–12

Rijeka

- Croatian Cup: 2013–14
- Croatian Supercup: 2014

Široki Brijeg

- Bosnia and Herzegovina Cup: 2016–17

=== Individual ===
Awards

- Sportske novosti Yellow Shirt award: 2011

Performance

- Prva HNL Player of the Season: 2010–11
