= Luka Marić (footballer, born 1987) =

Croatian footballer

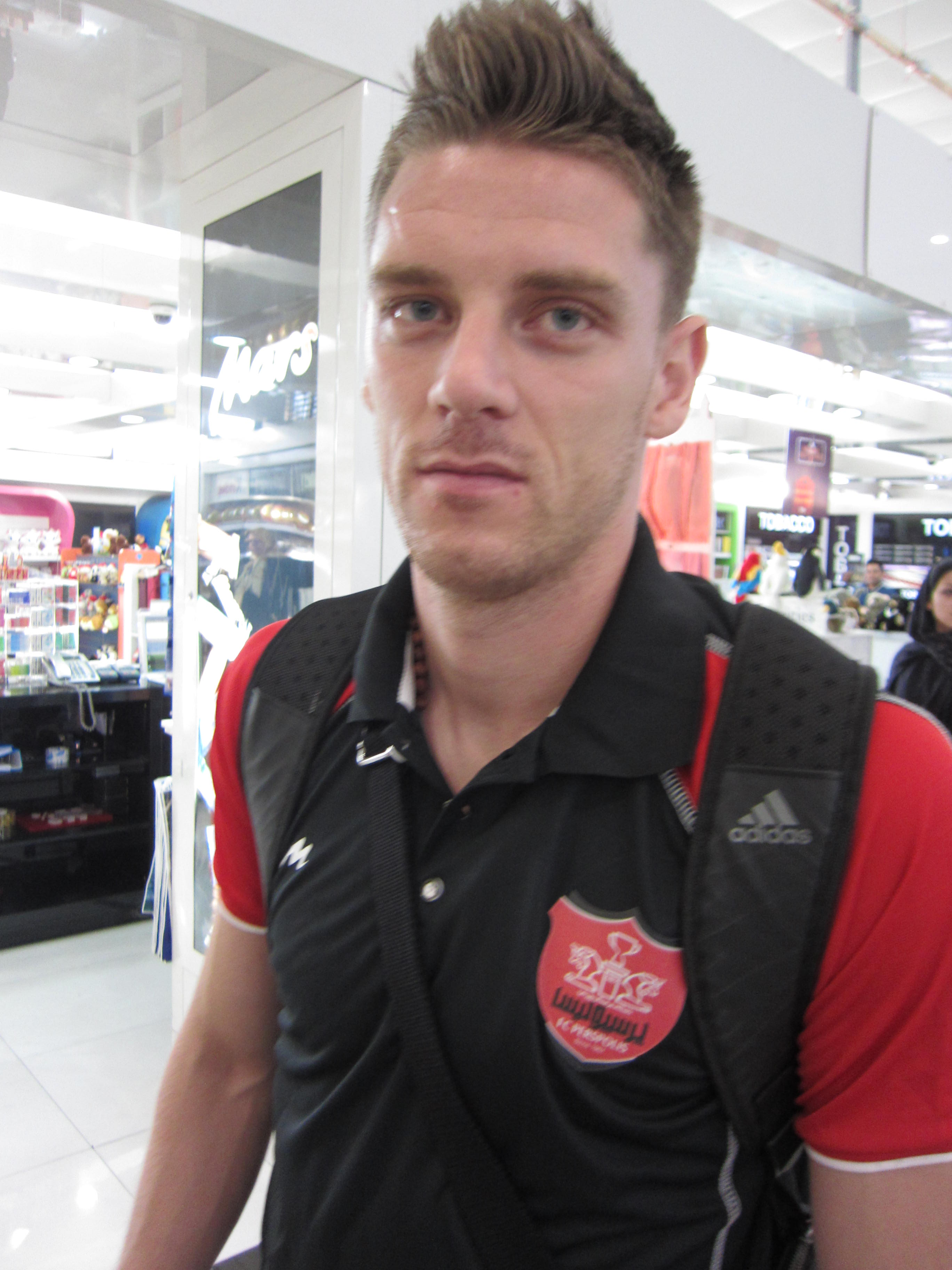
- Marić with Persepolis in 2015

Personal information
- Full name: Luka Marić
- Date of birth: 25 April 1987 (age 39)
- Place of birth: Pula, SFR Yugoslavia
- Height: 1.85 m (6 ft 1 in)
- Position: Centre-back

Team information
- Current team: Opatija
- Number: 21

Youth career
- Rovinj

Senior career*
Years	Team	Apps	(Gls)
2006–2009	Rovinj	58	(0)
2009–2011	Pomorac Kostrena	52	(1)
2011–2012	Istra 1961	19	(1)
2012–2014	Rijeka	39	(1)
2014–2015	Zawisza Bydgoszcz	17	(0)
2015–2016	Persepolis	20	(0)
2016–2018	Dinamo București	32	(2)
2018–2020	Arka Gdynia	42	(0)
2020–2021	Argeș Pitești	23	(1)
2022	FC Brașov	7	(1)
2022–2023	Concordia Chiajna	10	(0)
2023–	Opatija	58	(0)
- * Club domestic league appearances and goals as of 17 June 2026

Luka Marić (born 25 April 1987) is a Croatian professional footballer who plays as a centre-back for Opatija.

== Club career ==
Born in Pula, in his first professional season for Istra 1961 he collected 19 caps and scored once during the 2011-12 Prva HNL. In mid-2012 he moved to Rijeka. In November 2014 he moved to Zawisza Bydgoszcz.

On 5 July 2015 Marić signed a one-year deal with Iranian club Persepolis. Maric played 20 games in the 2015–16 season for Persepolis and helped the team to a runners up finish in the Persian Gulf Pro League. At the end of the 2015–16 season the club attempted to renegotiate Marić's contract but they could not reach an agreement and he was released.

In 2018–2020, he was the player of the Ekstraklasa side Arka Gdynia. On 27 October 2020, he joined the Romanian Liga I club Argeș Pitești.

== Career statistics ==
As of 31 December 2015.

Club	Season	League			Cup (Note: Includes Croatian Football Cup, Polish Cup and Hazfi Cup)		Continental (Note: Includes Europa League)		Total	
Club	Season	Division	Apps	Goals	Apps	Goals	Apps	Goals	Apps	Goals
Pomorac Kostrena	2009–10	2. HNL	24	0	4	0	—	—	28	0
Pomorac Kostrena	2010–11	2. HNL	28	1	1	0	—	—	29	1
Pomorac Kostrena	Total		52	1	5	0	—	—	57	1
Istra 1961	2011–12	1. HNL	19	1	2	0	—	—	21	1
Rijeka	2012–13	1. HNL	20	1	1	0	—	—	21	1
Rijeka	2013–14	1. HNL	19	0	4	0	9	0	32	0
Rijeka	Total		39	1	5	0	9	0	53	1
Zawisza Bydgoszcz	2014–15	Ekstraklasa	17	0	0	0	—	—	17	0
Persepolis	2015–16	Pro League	20	0	1	0	—	—	21	0
Career total			165	3	13	0	9	0	187	3

== Honours ==
Rijeka

- 1. HNL runner-up: 2013–14
- Croatian Football Cup: 2013–14

Persepolis

- Iran Pro League runner-up: 2015–16

Dinamo București

- Cupa Ligii: 2016–17

Arka Gdynia

- Polish Super Cup: 2018
