= Zoran Kvržić =

Bosnian footballer (born 1988)

Personal information
- Date of birth: 7 August 1988 (age 38)
- Place of birth: Teslić, SR Bosnia and Herzegovina, SFR Yugoslavia
- Height: 1.80 m (5 ft 11 in)
- Position: Right-back

Team information
- Current team: BSK Banja Luka
- Number: 20

Youth career
- Rudar Stanari
- Proleter Teslić

Senior career*
Years	Team	Apps	(Gls)
2005–2009	Proleter Teslić		
2009–2010	HAŠK	50	(17)
2010–2013	Osijek	75	(6)
2013–2020	Rijeka	117	(12)
2015–2016	→ Spezia (loan)	34	(1)
2016–2017	→ Sheriff Tiraspol (loan)	26	(1)
2020–2021	Kayserispor	47	(1)
2021–2023	Slaven Belupo	32	(1)
2023	Šibenik	17	(1)
2023–2026	Borac Banja Luka	62	(11)
2026–	BSK Banja Luka	12	(0)

International career
2011–2020	Bosnia and Herzegovina	8	(0)
- * Club domestic league appearances and goals as of 8 November 2026

Zoran Kvržić (pronounced [zǒran kʋřʒitɕ]; born 7 August 1988) is a Bosnian professional footballer who plays as a right-back for Bosnian Premier League club BSK Banja Luka.

Kvržić started his professional career at Proleter Teslić, before joining HAŠK in 2009. The following year, he switched to Osijek. In 2013, he was transferred to Rijeka, who loaned him to Spezia in 2015 and to Sheriff Tiraspol in 2016. He signed with Kayserispor in 2020. A year later, Kvržić moved to Slaven Belupo. In 2023, he joined Šibenik. Later that year, he signed with Borac Banja Luka. He went to BSK Banja Luka in 2026.

Kvržić made his senior international debut for Bosnia and Herzegovina in 2011, earning 8 caps until 2020.

== Club career ==
=== Early career ===
Kvržić started playing football at a local club, before joining the youth setup of his hometown team Proleter Teslić. He made his professional debut in 2005 at the age of 17.

In February 2009, he moved to Croatian side HAŠK.

In July 2010, he switched to Osijek.

=== Rijeka ===
In January 2013, Kvržić was transferred to Rijeka for an undisclosed fee. He made his official debut for the squad against Istra 1961 on 12 July. On 21 July, he scored his first goal for Rijeka against Hajduk Split. He won his first trophy with the club on 13 May 2014, by beating Dinamo Zagreb in the Croatian Cup final.

In January 2015, Kvržić was sent on a six-month loan to Italian outfit Spezia. In July, his loan was extended for an additional season.

In July 2016, he was loaned to Moldovan side Sheriff Tiraspol until the end of the campaign.

Kvržić signed a new three-year contract with Rijeka in November 2017.

He played his 100th game for the club against Cibalia on 26 November.

In September 2019, he prolonged his deal with the team until June 2022.

=== Kayserispor ===
In January 2020, Kvržić was transferred to Turkish outfit Kayserispor for an undisclosed fee. He was sent off on his competitive debut for the side on 18 January against Alanyaspor. On 13 September, he scored his first goal for Kayserispor against Kasımpaşa, which secured the victory for his squad.

=== Later stage of career ===
In October, Kvržić signed with Slaven Belupo.

In February 2023, he moved to Šibenik.

In June, he joined Borac Banja Luka.

In July 2026, he switched to BSK Banja Luka.

== International career ==
In December 2011, Kvržić received his first senior call up to Bosnia and Herzegovina, for a friendly game against Poland, and debuted in that match on 16 December.

== Career statistics ==
=== Club ===
As of match played 8 November 2026

Appearances and goals by club, season and competition
Club	Season	League			National cup (Note: Includes Croatian Cup, Coppa Italia, Cupa Moldovei, Turkish Cup, Bosnian Cup)		Continental		Other		Total	
Club	Season	Division	Apps	Goals	Apps	Goals	Apps	Goals	Apps	Goals	Apps	Goals
HAŠK	2008–09	Croatian Second League West	14	3	–		–		–		14	3
HAŠK	2009–10	Croatian Second League West	36	14	1	0	–		–		37	14
HAŠK	Total		50	17	1	0	–		–		51	17
Osijek	2010–11	Croatian Football League	21	2	3	1	–		–		24	3
Osijek	2011–12	Croatian Football League	24	0	8	3	–		–		32	3
Osijek	2012–13	Croatian Football League	30	4	4	1	4 (Note: Appearances in UEFA Europa League)	1	–		38	6
Osijek	Total		75	6	15	5	4	1	–		94	12
Rijeka	2013–14	Croatian Football League	29	5	3	1	10	2	–		42	8
Rijeka	2014–15	Croatian Football League	17	1	2	0	12	3	1 (Note: Appearance in Croatian Super Cup)	0	32	4
Rijeka	2015–16	Croatian Football League	1	0	0	0	2	1	–		3	1
Rijeka	2017–18	Croatian Football League	30	4	4	1	9 (Note: Three appearances in UEFA Champions League; six appearances, one goal in UEFA Europa League)	1	–		43	6
Rijeka	2018–19	Croatian Football League	29	2	5	1	2	0	–		36	3
Rijeka	2019–20	Croatian Football League	11	0	1	0	3	0	1	0	16	0
Rijeka	Total		117	12	15	3	38	7	2	0	172	22
Spezia (loan)	2014–15	Serie B	16	1	–		–		1 (Note: Appearance(s) in Serie B promotion play-offs)	0	17	1
Spezia (loan)	2015–16	Serie B	18	0	3	0	–		3	0	24	0
Spezia (loan)	Total		34	1	3	0	–		4	0	41	1
Sheriff Tiraspol (loan)	2016–17	Moldovan Super Liga	26	5	1	0	2 (Note: Appearances in UEFA Champions League)	0	0	0	29	5
Kayserispor	2019–20	Süper Lig	10	0	0	0	–		–		10	0
Kayserispor	2020–21	Süper Lig	36	1	1	2	–		–		37	3
Kayserispor	2021–22	Süper Lig	1	0	0	0	–		–		1	0
Kayserispor	Total		47	1	1	2	–		–		48	3
Slaven Belupo	2021–22	Croatian Football League	18	1	2	0	–		–		20	1
Slaven Belupo	2022–23	Croatian Football League	14	0	1	0	–		–		15	0
Slaven Belupo	Total		32	1	3	0	–		–		35	1
Šibenik	2022–23	Croatian Football League	17	1	3	0	–		–		20	1
Borac Banja Luka	2023–24	Bosnian Premier League	25	7	7	0	2 (Note: Appearances in UEFA Conference League)	0	–		34	7
Borac Banja Luka	2024–25	Bosnian Premier League	22	4	5	0	16 (Note: Four appearances in UEFA Champions League; four appearances in UEFA Europa League; eight appearances in UEFA Conference League)	0	1 (Note: Appearance in Bosnian Supercup)	0	44	4
Borac Banja Luka	2025–26	Bosnian Premier League	15	0	1	0	2	0	–		18	0
Borac Banja Luka	Total		62	11	13	0	20	0	1	0	96	11
BSK Banja Luka	2026–27	Bosnian Premier League	12	0	0	0	–		–		12	0
Career total			472	55	55	10	64	8	7	0	598	73

=== International ===
Appearances and goals by national team and year
National team	Year	Apps	Goals
Bosnia and Herzegovina
Bosnia and Herzegovina	2011	1	0
Bosnia and Herzegovina	2012	0	0
Bosnia and Herzegovina	2013	2	0
Bosnia and Herzegovina	2014	1	0
Bosnia and Herzegovina	2015	0	0
Bosnia and Herzegovina	2016	0	0
Bosnia and Herzegovina	2017	0	0
Bosnia and Herzegovina	2018	0	0
Bosnia and Herzegovina	2019	3	0
Bosnia and Herzegovina	2020	1	0
Total		8	0

== Honours ==
Rijeka

- Croatian Cup: 2013–14, 2018–19
- Croatian Super Cup: 2014

Sheriff Tiraspol

- Moldovan Super Liga: 2016–17
- Cupa Moldovei: 2016–17
- Supercupa Moldovei: 2016

Borac Banja Luka

- Bosnian Premier League: 2023–24, 2025–26
