= Duplje =

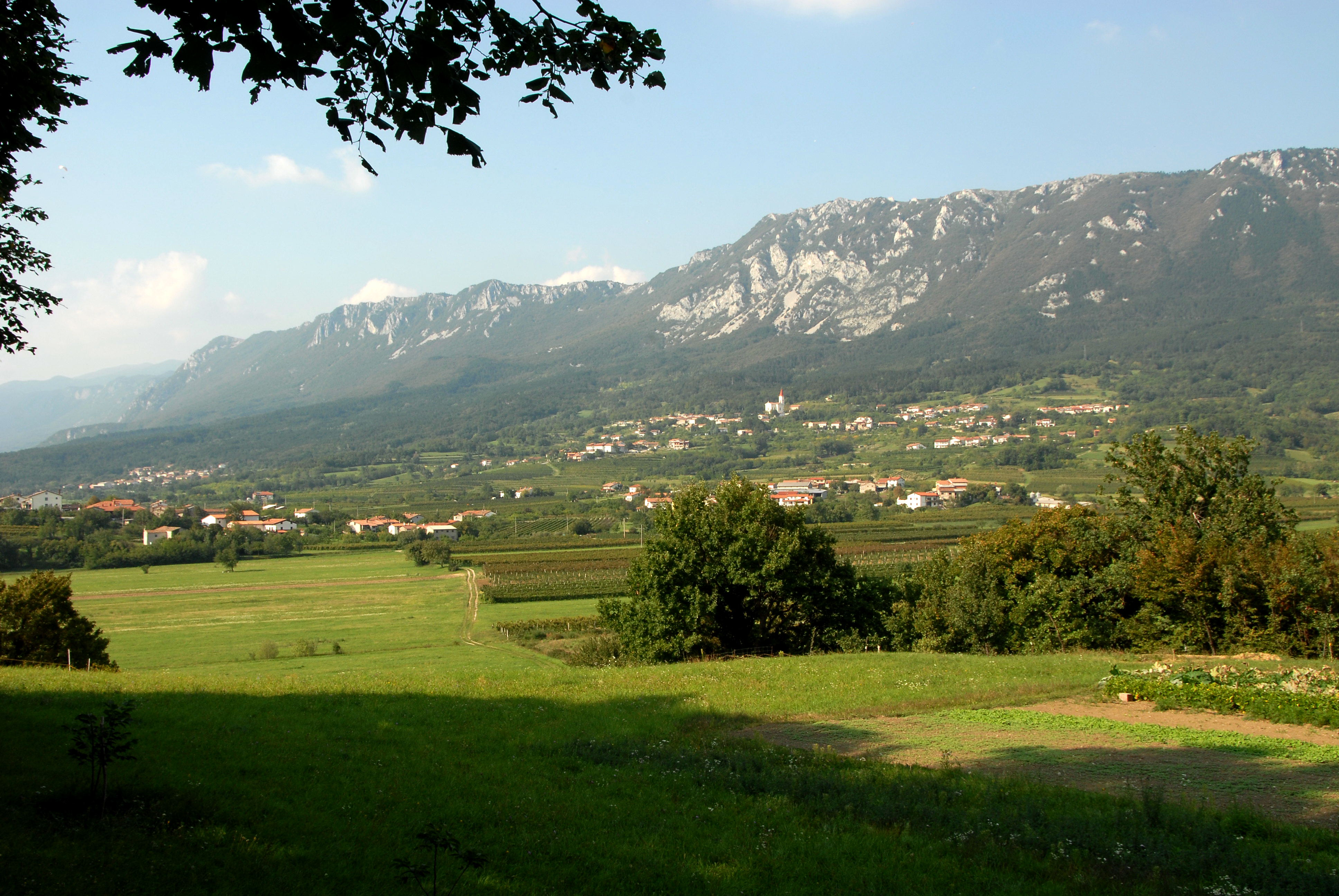
- The village of Duplje in the front and the village of Budanje in the background

- Location in Slovenia
- Coordinates: 45°51′45.12″N 13°56′49.23″E
- Country: Slovenia
- Traditional region: Littoral
- Statistical region: Gorizia
- Municipality: Vipava

Area
  - Total: 2.47 km^{2} (0.95 sq mi)
- Elevation: 114.9 m (377 ft)

Population (2002)
  - Total: 204

Duplje (pronounced [ˈduːpljɛ]) is a settlement in the Vipava Valley in the Municipality of Vipava in the Littoral region of Slovenia.
