= Ivan Boras =

Croatian football defender

Personal information
- Date of birth: 31 October 1991 (age 35)
- Place of birth: Zagreb, Croatia
- Height: 1.91 m (6 ft 3 in)
- Positions: Right back; right midfielder

Team information
- Current team: Devetka

Youth career
- –2007: Lokomotiva
- 2007–2009: Dinamo Zagreb
- 2009–2010: Lokomotiva

Senior career*
Years	Team	Apps	(Gls)
2010–2013	Lokomotiva	74	(7)
2013–2014	Rijeka	10	(0)
2014	Dinamo Zagreb	1	(0)
2014–2019	Dinamo Zagreb B	13	(0)
2019–2020	Krško	1	(0)
2021–	Devetka		

International career
2013	Croatia U21	1	(1)
- * Club domestic league appearances and goals as of 16:06, 3 December 2019 (UTC)

Ivan Boras (born 31 October 1991) is a Croatian football defender, currently playing for Devetka.
