= Vedran Jugović =

Croatian footballer (born 1989)

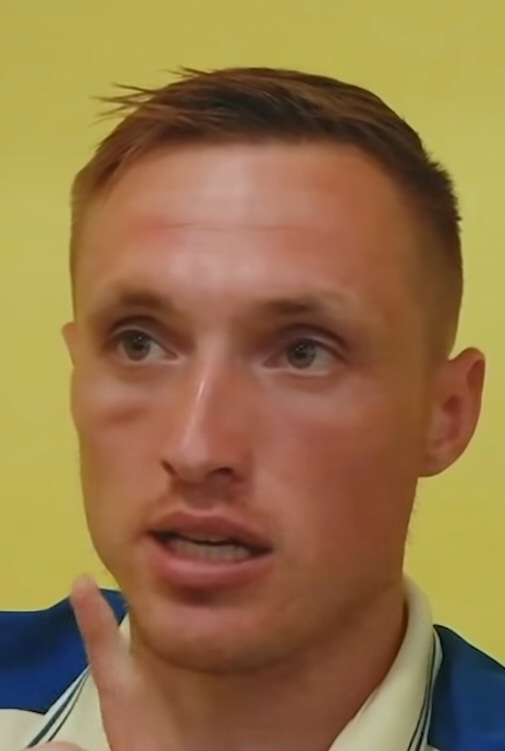

Personal information
- Date of birth: 10 September 1989 (age 37)
- Place of birth: Osijek, SR Croatia, SFR Yugoslavia
- Height: 1.78 m (5 ft 10 in)
- Position: Midfielder

Team information
- Current team: Osijek (assistant)

Youth career
- –2003: Olimpija Osijek
- 2004–2007: Osijek

Senior career*
Years	Team	Apps	(Gls)
2007–2013	Osijek	100	(7)
2007–2008	→ Olimpija (loan)		
2013–2016	Rijeka	69	(5)
2016	→ Jeonnam Dragons (loan)	33	(5)
2017–2019	Jeonnam Dragons	62	(4)
2019–2026	Osijek	144	(9)

Managerial career
- 2026–: Osijek (assistant)
- * Club domestic league appearances and goals as of 1 June 2025

Vedran Jugović (Croatian pronunciation: [ʋědran jûɡoʋitɕ]; born 10 September 1989) is a Croatian retired footballer, who most recently played for NK Osijek in the Prva HNL.

== Club career ==
=== Osijek ===
Jugović started his career playing at youth level for Osijek, with whom he signed a professional contract in 2008. He collected over 100 caps for Osijek over five seasons, scoring eight goals.

=== Rijeka ===
In February 2013, Jugović was transferred to Rijeka together with his teammate Ivan Vargić. He made his debut for Rijeka in Round 21 1. HNL fixture against HNK Cibalia, coming on as a substitute in the 61st minute. He made 10 further appearances that season, collecting two assists and scoring in the final round of the season in a 4–1 win over NK Zagreb. The 2013–14 season was difficult for Jugović, with injuries hampering his performances. He managed 31 appearances in all competitions, including a game against Real Betis, his first in the UEFA Europa League. Until December 2015, he collected 100 caps for Rijeka in all competition, scoring seven goals.

=== Jeonnam ===
On 6 January 2016, HNK Rijeka announced that Jugović has been loaned to Jeonnam Dragons for one year with a buying option. On 10 October 2016, it was revealed that Jeonnam Dragons exercised their buying option for an estimated fee of €500,000. Jugović signed a three-year contract with the Korean club.

== Career statistics ==
As of 25 May 2024

Club	Season	League			Cup		Continental		Other		Total	
Club	Season	Division	Apps	Goals	Apps	Goals	Apps	Goals	Apps	Goals	Apps	Goals
Osijek	2008–09	1. HNL	24	0	—		—		—		24	0
Osijek	2009–10	1. HNL	27	6	4	0	—		—		33	6
Osijek	2010–11	1. HNL	24	1	3	1	—		—		27	2
Osijek	2011–12	1. HNL	14	0	6	0	—		—		20	0
Osijek	2012–13	1. HNL	11	0	2	0	4	1	—		17	1
Osijek	Total		100	7	15	1	4	1	—		119	9
Rijeka	2012–13	1. HNL	12	1	—		—		—		12	1
Rijeka	2013–14	1. HNL	20	1	7	0	4	1	—		31	2
Rijeka	2014–15	1. HNL	26	3	5	1	12	0	1	0	44	4
Rijeka	2015–16	1. HNL	11	0	2	0	—		—		13	0
Rijeka	Total		69	5	15	1	16	1	—		100	7
Jeonnam Dragons	2016	K League 1	33	5	2	0	—		—		35	5
Jeonnam Dragons	2017	K League 1	28	3	1	1	—		—		29	4
Jeonnam Dragons	2018	K League 1	27	1	0	0	—		—		27	1
Jeonnam Dragons	2019	K League 2	7	0	0	0	—		—		7	0
Jeonnam Dragons	Total		95	9	3	1	0	0	—		98	10
Osijek	2019–20	1. HNL	14	0	2	0	1	0	—		17	0
Osijek	2020–21	1. HNL	23	2	2	1	1	0	—		26	3
Osijek	2021–22	1. HNL	18	0	3	0	3	0	—		24	0
Osijek	2022–23	1. HNL	32	1	3	1	0	0	—		35	2
Osijek	2023–24	1. HNL	27	4	2	0	4	0	—		33	4
Osijek	Total		114	7	12	2	9	0	—		135	9
Career total			378	28	44	5	29	2	1	0	452	35
