= Goran Mujanović =

Croatian footballer

Personal information
- Date of birth: 29 September 1983 (age 43)
- Place of birth: Varaždin, SFR Yugoslavia
- Height: 1.75 m (5 ft 9 in)
- Position: Midfielder

Youth career
- 1994–2002: Varteks

Senior career*
Years	Team	Apps	(Gls)
2002–2005	Varteks	61	(9)
2002–2003	→ Pomorac (loan)	29	(3)
2005–2007	Lierse	34	(3)
2007–2010	Varteks	86	(22)
2010–2012	Slaven Belupo	66	(8)
2012–2014	Rijeka	58	(4)
2014–2015	Al-Nasr		
2016	Birkirkara	14	(2)
2016-2017	Varaždin		
2017-2019	Trnje Trnovec	0	(0)

International career
1998–1999	Croatia U15	3	(0)
1999	Croatia U16	6	(1)
1999	Croatia U17	1	(0)
2001	Croatia U18	2	(0)
2001	Croatia U19	1	(0)
2002–2003	Croatia U20	6	(0)
2004–2005	Croatia U21	13	(0)
- * Club domestic league appearances and goals as of 26 December 2017

Goran Mujanović (born 29 September 1983) is a Croatian retired football midfielder who was last registered with Trnje Trnovec, but did not play any games there. He can also play as attacker-forward.

== Club career ==
In the 2008–09 season, with NK Varteks, he was the club's top scorer in the top level Prva HNL. He signed for Slaven Belupo in 2010.

He joined Varaždin in August 2016 after a spell in Malta.
