= HNK Rijeka Academy =

Youth academy of Croatian football club Rijeka

Rijeka II
- Full name: Hrvatski nogometni klub Rijeka II
- Founded: 4 June 2014; 11 years ago
- Dissolved: 28 May 2016
- Ground: Stadion Rujevica
- Coordinates: 45°20′52.4″N 14°24′8.1″E
- 2015–16: Treća HNL West, 10th
- Website: www.nk-rijeka.hr/momcad/2/
Home colours	Away colours	Third colours

HNK Rijeka Academy is the youth academy of HNK Rijeka. There are a total of eleven age categories within the academy, the oldest being the Juniori (under-19) and youngest the Morčići (under-8). Rijeka's football academy was officially founded in 1972. More than 400 youth footballers attend the academy.

== Training camp ==
HNK Rijeka's youth academy are based at the newly built training camp, located in the Rujevica neighbourhood, 4 km northwest of the city centre. Officially opened in August 2015 at a cost of €24 million, the training centre was financed by the owners of HNK Rijeka. In addition to four fields that are mainly used by the club's youth teams, the facility also houses Stadion Rujevica, the first team's temporary home ground during construction of new Kantrida.

== Rijeka U19 ==
Rijeka U19 compete in the Croatian Academy Football League (Juniori).

As of 6 July 2023

Note: Flags indicate national team as defined under FIFA eligibility rules; some limited exceptions apply. Players may hold more than one non-FIFA nationality.

No.	Pos.	Nation	Player
—	GK	(Serbia) SRB	Aleksa Todorović
—	GK	(Croatia) CRO	Antonio Frigan
—	GK	(Croatia) CRO	Karlo Bliznac
—	DF	(Croatia) CRO	Lukas Buić
—	DF	(Croatia) CRO	Dorian Anušić
—	DF	(Croatia) CRO	Bruno Burčul
—	DF	(Croatia) CRO	Luka Živanović
—	DF	(Croatia) CRO	Duje Dujmović
—	DF	(Croatia) CRO	Noel Bodetić
—	DF	(Croatia) CRO	Sean Šuke
—	MF	(Croatia) CRO	Nikša Čulina
—	MF	(Croatia) CRO	Lovro Mikulica

No.	Pos.	Nation	Player
—	MF	(Croatia) CRO	Andro Babić
—	MF	(Croatia) CRO	Borna Panić
—	MF	(Croatia) CRO	Boris Mikloš
—	MF	(Croatia) CRO	Dominik Simčić
—	MF	(Montenegro) MNE	Strahinja Tešović
—	FW	(Croatia) CRO	Niko Gajzler
—	FW	(Croatia) CRO	Din Begović
—	FW	(Croatia) CRO	Noah Bossi
—	FW	(Croatia) CRO	Roko Begonja
—	FW	(Croatia) CRO	Duje Korač
—	FW	(Croatia) CRO	Matej Momčilovski

== Reserve team (2014–16) ==
HNK Rijeka II were HNK Rijeka's reserve team for two consecutive seasons. Rijeka II were formed in June 2014 and initially replaced the club's U19 team. For two seasons, Rijeka II competed in Croatia's 3. HNL. Following the end of the 2015–16 Croatian Third Football League, in May 2016, the club leadership decided to disband the reserve team.

=== Seasons ===
Season	League									Top goalscorer	
Season	Division	P	W	D	L	F	A	Pts	Pos	Player	Goals
2014–15	3. HNL West	30	19	5	6	51	21	62	2nd	Filip Dangubić	16
2015–16	3. HNL West	30	13	3	14	43	49	42	10th	Dario Vizinger	7

Key

P = Matches played; W = Matches won; D = Matches drawn; L = Matches lost; F = Goals for; A = Goals against; Pts = Points won; Pos = Final position.

== Staff ==
As of 22 June 2021

- Director: (Croatia) Fausto Budicin
- Assistant director: (Croatia) Renato Pilipović
- Administrative director: (Croatia) Ranko Buketa
- First-team liaison officer: (Croatia) Vjekoslav Miletić
- Scout: (Croatia) Željko Rukavina
- Goalkeeping coaches: (Croatia) Marijan Jantoljak, (Croatia) Đoni Tafra
- Doctors: (Croatia) Luka Širola, (Croatia) Andrej Zec
- Physiotherapists: (Croatia) Bruno Greblički, (Croatia) Alen Ilić, (Croatia) Riva Milić
- Fitness coaches: (Croatia) Ivana Marković, (Croatia) Hrvoje Josipović
- Kit manager: (Croatia) Josip Jeseničnik, (Croatia) Denis Miškulin
- U19 manager: (Croatia) Dragan Tadić
- U19 assistant manager: (Croatia) Rade Ljepojević
- U17 manager: (Croatia) Zdravko Šimić
- U17 assistant manager: (Croatia) Nikola Radmanović
- U15 manager: (Croatia) Dean Bolić
- U15 assistant manager: (Croatia) Marin Duvnjak
- U14 manager: (Croatia) Marin Juričić
- U13 manager: (Croatia) Ivan Mijolović
- U12 manager: (Croatia) Đulio Staver
- U11 manager: (Croatia) Stipe Kardum
- U10 manager: (Croatia) Kristijan Čaval
- U9 manager: (Croatia) Valentino Klanac

== Honours ==
- Croatian Championship U19 (5): 1981, 1987, 1992, 1996, 2014
- Croatian Championship U17 (1): 1990
- Yugoslav Cup U18 (1): 1982
- Croatian Cup U19 (6): 1982, 1990, 1992, 1993, 1997, 2007
- Croatian Cup U17 (2): 1989, 1994
- Kvarnerska Rivijera U19/U17 (Rijeka, Croatia) (20): 1957, 1960, 1964, 1968, 1973, 1975, 1987, 1989, 1992–93, 1996, 2001, 2006, 2009–12, 2014, 2016–17
- Bellinzona U18 (Bellinzona, Switzerland) (3): 1955, 1956, 1965
- Future Talents Cup U17 (Budapest, Hungary) (1): 2016
- Football Friends Foča U17 (Foča, Bosnia and Herzegovina) (3): 2016, 2017, 2018
- Karol Wojtyła Cup U19 (Province of Rome, Italy) (1): 2017
