= 2013–14 Croatian Football Cup =

Tournament details
- Country: Croatia
- Teams: 48

Final positions
- Champions: Rijeka (3rd title)
- Runners-up: Dinamo Zagreb

Tournament statistics
- Matches played: 52
- Goals scored: 192 (3.69 per match)
- Top goal scorer: Andrej Kramarić (10)

The 2013–14 Croatian Football Cup is the twenty-third season of Croatia's football knockout competition. The defending champions are Hajduk Split, having won their sixth title the previous year by defeating Lokomotiva in the final.

== Calendar ==
Round	Date(s)	Number of fixtures	Clubs	New entries this round
Preliminary round	28 August 2013	16	48 → 32	none
First round	25 September 2013	16	32 → 16	16
Second round	30 October 2013	8	16 → 8	none
Quarter-finals	27 November and 4 December 2013	8	8 → 4	none
Semi-finals	12 and 26 March 2014	4	4 → 2	none
Final	7 and 21 May 2014	2	2 → 1	none

== Preliminary round ==
The draw for the preliminary round was held on 1 August 2013 with matches scheduled on 28 August 2013.

Tie no	Home team	Score	Away team
1	Drava Novigrad Podravski	bye	Novalja
2	Opatija	2–3	Lučko
3	Mladost Ždralovi	1–2 (aet)	Marsonia
4	Međimurje	4–3	Lekenik
5	Torpedo Kuševac	9–0	Omladinac Novi Grad
6	Novigrad	5–0	Mladost Palinovec
7	Slavonija Požega	2–0	Graničar Županja
8	Radnički Mece	1–1 (2–4 p)	Suhopolje
9	Zagora Unešić	6–3	Ogulin
10	Borac Imbriovec	2–5	Zmaj Blato
11	Jadran Poreč	3–2 (aet)	Bobota
12^{*}	Zagorec Krapina	1–4	NK Kustošija
13	Zadar	5–0	Plitvica Gojanec
14	Podravina Ludbreg	3–1 (aet)	Imotski
15^{*}	Gorica	6–0	Moslavac Popovača
16	Zelina	2–2 (5–3 p)	Croatia Grabrovnica

* Match played on 27 August.

== First round ==
First round proper consisted of 16 single-legged matches, with 16 winners of the preliminary round joined by 16 clubs with the highest cup coefficients. The draw for the first round was held on 28 August, where the club with the lowest cup coefficient hosts the one with the highest and so on. Matches were scheduled on 25 September 2013.

Tie no	Home team	Score	Away team
1	Suhopolje	0–6	Dinamo Zagreb
2^{**}	Kustošija	1–5	Hajduk Split
3	Drava Novigrad Podravski	0–3	Cibalia
4	Torpedo Kuševac	0–3	Osijek
5	Novigrad	3–0	Varaždin
6^{*}	Jadran Poreč	0–6	Slaven Belupo
7	Marsonia	0–5	NK Zagreb
8	Podravina Ludbreg	1–0	Šibenik
9^{***}	Rijeka	11–0	Zmaj Blato
10	Slavonija Požega	1–2	Istra 1961
11	Lučko	4–1	Pomorac
12	Gorica	0–0 (1–2 p)	Inter Zaprešić
13	Međimurje	bye	Karlovac
14	Segesta	0–2	Zadar
15	Zelina	0–1	Vinogradar
16	HAŠK	1–2	Zagora Unešić

* Match was played on 24 September.

** Match was played on 1 October.

*** Match was played on 9 October.

== Second round ==
The second round was contested by 16 winners from the first round in eight single-legged fixtures scheduled on 30 October 2013. It was the last stage of the competition employing the single leg format as from the quarter-finals onwards all fixtures are going to be double-legged events.

Tie no	Home team	Score	Away team
1	Zagora Unešić	0–5	Dinamo Zagreb
2	Vinogradar	1–3 (aet)	Hajduk Split
3	Cibalia	0–2	Zadar
4	Međimurje	0–2 (aet)	Osijek
5	Novigrad	0–2	Inter Zaprešić
6	Slaven Belupo	5–4	Lučko
7	NK Zagreb	0–0 (3–4 p)	Istra 1961
8	Podravina	1–3	Rijeka

== Quarter-finals ==
Quarter-final ties were played over two legs, scheduled for 27 November and 4 December 2013. The round featured eight winners from the second round. The unseeded draw for quarter-final pairings was held on 5 November. The tie between Rijeka and Osijek has been postponed for 2014 due to Rijeka's congested fixture list. Both clubs initially agreed to play the first leg in Rijeka on 12 February 2014 and the second leg in Osijek on 19 February 2014. However, due to the flooded pitch in Rijeka, the first leg was played on 19 February and the return leg in Osijek on 12 March.

Team 1	Agg.	Team 2	1st leg	2nd leg
Rijeka	1–1 (4–2 p)	Osijek	1–0	0–1
Istra 1961	3–0	Zadar	1–0	2–0
Dinamo Zagreb	7–1	Hajduk Split	5–0	2–1
Slaven Belupo	2–1	Inter Zaprešić	2–1	0–0

== Semi-finals ==
12 March 2014
17:00

Slaven Belupo	0–2	Dinamo Zagreb
	Report (in Croatian)	Pamić 56'; Brozović 73'

Gradski stadion, Koprivnica
Attendance: 2,000
Referee: Andrej Burilo (Osijek)
26 March 2014
17:00

Dinamo Zagreb	2–1	Slaven Belupo
Čop 27'; Brodić 83'	Report (in Croatian)	Rak 52'

Stadion Maksimir, Zagreb
Attendance: 1,000
Referee: Marin Vidulin (Kanfanar)

Dinamo Zagreb won 4–1 on aggregate.

19 March 2014
18:00

Rijeka	2–1	Istra 1961
Kramarić 59', 61'	Report (in Croatian)	Radonjić 9'

Stadion Kantrida, Rijeka
Attendance: 7,000
Referee: Goran Gabrilo (Split)
26 March 2014
19:00

Istra 1961	0–1	Rijeka
	Report (in Croatian)	Krstanović 68'

Stadion Aldo Drosina, Pula
Attendance: 7,500
Referee: Bruno Marić (Daruvar)

Rijeka won 3–1 on aggregate.

== Final ==
=== First leg ===
7 May 2014
18:00

Dinamo Zagreb	0–1	Rijeka
	Report (in Croatian)	Tomečak 40'

Stadion Maksimir, Zagreb
Attendance: 10,324
Referee: Zlatko Šimčić (Koprivnica)

=== Second leg ===
13 May 2014
20:00

Rijeka	2–0	Dinamo Zagreb
Mitrović 34'; Kvržić 81'	Report (in Croatian)

Stadion Kantrida, Rijeka
Attendance: 11,000
Referee: Domagoj Ljubičić (Osijek)

Rijeka won 3–0 on aggregate
