= 2009–10 HNK Rijeka season =

Rijeka
2009–10 season
- Chairman: Ivan Turčić
- Manager: Robert Rubčić, Zoran Vulić, Nenad Gračan
- Stadium: Stadion Kantrida
- Prva HNL: 9th
- Croatian Cup: Round 2
- Europa League: Qualifying Round 3
- Top goalscorer: League: Radomir Đalović (10); All: Radomir Đalović (11)
- Highest home attendance: 7,500 vs Metalist Kharkiv (30 July 2009 - Europa League)
- Lowest home attendance: 800 (2 times - Prva HNL)
- Average home league attendance: 2,087

The 2009–10 season was the 64th season in Rijeka's history. It was their 19th season in the Prva HNL and 36th successive top tier season.

== Competitions ==
Competition	First match	Last match	Starting round	Final position	Record							
Competition	First match	Last match	Starting round	Final position	G	W	D	L	GF	GA	GD	Win %
Prva HNL	27 July 2009	31 May 2010	Matchday 1	9th	30	10	10	10	49	44	+5	33.33
Croatian Cup	23 September 2009	27 October 2009	First round	Second round	2	1	0	1	2	4	−2	50.00
Europa League	16 July 2009	6 August 2009	QR2	QR3	4	1	0	3	4	5	−1	25.00
Total					36	12	10	14	55	53	+2	33.33

=== Prva HNL ===
==== Classification ====
Pos	Team	Pld	W	D	L	GF	GA	GD	Pts
7	Slaven Belupo	30	11	10	9	44	45	−1	43
8	Lokomotiva	30	12	6	12	35	38	−3	42
9	Rijeka	30	10	10	10	49	44	+5	40
10	Varteks	30	9	9	12	36	43	−7	36
11	Istra 1961	30	9	8	13	31	40	−9	35

Source: Sportnet.hr
Rules for classification: 1) points; 2) goal difference; 3) number of goals scored.
For deciding champions, qualification to UEFA Europa League and relegation: 1st points; 2nd head-to-head points; 3rd head-to-head goal difference; 4th head-to-head away goals scored.

==== Results summary ====
Overall								Home						Away					
Pld	W	D	L	GF	GA	GD	Pts	W	D	L	GF	GA	GD	W	D	L	GF	GA	GD
30	10	10	10	49	44	+5	40	8	5	2	37	18	+19	2	5	8	12	26	−14

==== Results by round ====
Round	1	2	3	4	5	6	7	8	9	10	11	12	13	14	15	16	17	18	19	20	21	22	23	24	25	26	27	28	29	30
Ground	H	A	H	A	H	A	H	A	H	A	H	A	H	A	H	A	H	A	H	A	H	A	H	A	H	A	H	A	H	A
Result	W	D	W	L	W	L	D	L	W	W	D	D	L	L	W	L	D	D	D	D	L	L	D	W	W	L	W	D	W	L
Position	2	3	2	6	4	6	5	7	5	5	5	7	7	7	8	8	9	9	9	9	9	10	10	9	9	9	9	9	9	9

Source: Competitive matches
A = Away; H = Home; W = Win; D = Draw; L = Loss

== Matches ==
=== Prva HNL ===
Round	Date	Venue	Opponent	Score	Attendance	Rijeka Scorers	Report
1	26 Jul	H	Lokomotiva	6 – 0	3,000	Ah. Sharbini (3), An. Sharbini (3)	HRnogomet.com
2	2 Aug	A	Varteks	1 – 1	2,000	Turkalj	HRnogomet.com
3	9 Aug	H	Zagreb	3 – 1	2,000	Budicin, Gerc, Fernández	HRnogomet.com
4	15 Aug	A	Cibalia	0 – 1	3,500		HRnogomet.com
5	23 Aug	H	Hajduk Split	2 – 0	7,000	Fernández (2)	HRnogomet.com
6	29 Aug	A	Šibenik	0 – 1	2,000		HRnogomet.com
7	12 Sep	H	Karlovac	1 – 1	2,000	Tadejević	HRnogomet.com
8	20 Sep	A	Dinamo Zagreb	0 – 6	1,500		HRnogomet.com
9	26 Sep	H	Međimurje	4 – 0	1,000	Matko (2), Fernández (2)	HRnogomet.com
10	3 Oct	AR	Croatia Sesvete	2 – 1	74	Turkalj, Fernández	HRnogomet.com
11	17 Oct	H	Osijek	1 – 1	1,000	Čulina	HRnogomet.com
12	24 Oct	A	Zadar	1 – 1	1,200	Đalović	HRnogomet.com
13	31 Oct	H	Slaven Belupo	2 – 3	800	Pamić, o.g.	HRnogomet.com
14	7 Nov	A	Inter Zaprešić	0 – 3	300		HRnogomet.com
15	21 Nov	H	Istra 1961	2 – 0	1,500	Štrok, Križman	HRnogomet.com
16	28 Nov	A	Lokomotiva	0 – 3	300		HRnogomet.com
17	5 Dec	H	Varteks	3 – 3	800	Đalović (2), Križman	HRnogomet.com
18	26 Feb	A	Zagreb	1 – 1	800	Đalović	HRnogomet.com
19	6 Mar	H	Cibalia	1 – 1	2,500	Križman	HRnogomet.com
20	13 Mar	A	Hajduk Split	1 – 1	10,000	Kreilach	HRnogomet.com
21	20 Mar	H	Šibenik	0 – 1	1,500		HRnogomet.com
22	27 Mar	A	Karlovac	0 – 2	1,000		HRnogomet.com
23	3 Apr	H	Dinamo Zagreb	2 – 2	5,000	Štrok, Pamić	HRnogomet.com
24	10 Apr	A	Međimurje	5 – 1	500	Gerc (3), Kreilach, Đalović	HRnogomet.com
25	14 Apr	H	Croatia Sesvete	4 – 2	1,000	Đalović (2), Štrok (2)	HRnogomet.com
26	17 Apr	A	Osijek	0 – 1	1,500		HRnogomet.com
27	24 Apr	H	Zadar	3 – 2	1,000	Đalović, Budicin, Pamić	HRnogomet.com
28	1 May	A	Slaven Belupo	1 – 1	1,200	Križman	HRnogomet.com
29	8 May	H	Inter Zaprešić	3 – 1	1,200	Đalović (2), Gerc	HRnogomet.com
30	13 May	A	Istra 1961	0 – 2	2,500		HRnogomet.com

Source: HRnogomet.com

=== Croatian Cup ===
Round	Date	Venue	Opponent	Score	Attendance	Rijeka Scorers	Report
R1	23 Sep	AR	MV Croatia	2 – 0	1,500	Đalović, Matko	HRnogomet.com
R2	27 Oct	A	Šibenik	0 – 4	1,500		HRnogomet.com

Source: HRnogomet.com

=== Europa League ===
Round	Date	Venue	Opponent	Score	Attendance	Rijeka Scorers	Report
QR2	16 Jul	A	Differdange (Luxembourg)	0 – 1	800		HRnogomet.com
QR2	23 Jul	H	Differdange (Luxembourg)	3 – 0	4,000	Cerić, An. Sharbini, Ah. Sharbini	HRnogomet.com
QR3	30 Jul	H	Metalist Kharkiv (Ukraine)	1 – 2	7,500	Ah. Sharbini	HRnogomet.com
QR3	6 Aug	A	Metalist Kharkiv (Ukraine)	0 – 2	15,000		HRnogomet.com

Source: HRnogomet.com

=== Squad statistics ===
Competitive matches only.
Appearances in brackets indicate numbers of times the player came on as a substitute.

Name	Apps	Goals	Apps	Goals	Apps	Goals	Apps	Goals
Name	League		Cup		Europe		Total	
(Croatia) Ivan Mance	18 (0)	0	1 (0)	0	3 (0)	0	22 (0)	0
(Croatia) Velimir Radman	12 (0)	0	1 (0)	0	1 (0)	0	14 (0)	0
(Croatia) Alen Pamić	26 (0)	3	2 (0)	0	3 (0)	0	31 (0)	3
(Croatia) Igor Čagalj	26 (0)	0	2 (0)	0	4 (0)	0	32 (0)	0
(Croatia) Fausto Budicin	26 (1)	2	2 (0)	0	4 (0)	0	32 (1)	2
(Croatia) Davor Landeka	25 (0)	0	2 (0)	0	3 (0)	0	30 (0)	0
(Croatia) Hrvoje Štrok	25 (4)	4	1 (0)	0	4 (0)	0	30 (4)	4
(Croatia) Sandi Križman	15 (2)	4	0 (0)	0	2 (0)	0	17 (2)	4
(Argentina) Ramón Ignacio Fernández	18 (9)	6	2 (0)	0	3 (0)	0	23 (9)	6
(Montenegro) Radomir Đalović	20 (1)	10	1 (1)	1	0 (0)	0	21 (2)	11
(Croatia) Matija Matko	11 (4)	2	1 (0)	1	1 (1)	0	13 (5)	3
(Croatia) Damir Kreilach	16 (9)	2	0 (2)	0	1 (2)	0	17 (13)	2
(Croatia) Vedran Turkalj	14 (2)	2	1 (0)	0	1 (1)	0	16 (3)	2
(North Macedonia) Vlade Lazarevski	9 (0)	0	0 (0)	0	0 (0)	0	9 (0)	0
(Croatia) Denis Ljubović	12 (2)	0	0 (1)	0	0 (0)	0	12 (3)	0
(Croatia) Mario Tadejević	12 (5)	1	2 (0)	0	2 (1)	0	16 (6)	1
(Croatia) Vedran Gerc	8 (6)	5	1 (0)	0	1 (0)	0	10 (6)	5
(Bosnia and Herzegovina) Kenan Čejvanović	9 (5)	0	1 (0)	0	1 (1)	0	11 (6)	0
(Bosnia and Herzegovina) Tarik Cerić	7 (1)	0	1 (0)	0	3 (0)	1	11 (1)	1
(Belgium) Mikael Yourassowsky	7 (0)	0	0 (0)	0	0 (0)	0	7 (0)	0
(United States) Johann Smith	0 (5)	0	0 (0)	0	1 (3)	0	1 (8)	0
(Slovenia) Nastja Čeh	3 (4)	0	0 (1)	0	0 (0)	0	3 (5)	0
(Croatia) Anas Sharbini	1 (0)	3	0 (0)	0	3 (0)	1	4 (0)	4
(Croatia) Ahmad Sharbini	1 (0)	3	0 (0)	0	3 (0)	2	4 (0)	5
(Croatia) Valentino Stepčić	5 (4)	0	0 (0)	0	0 (1)	0	5 (5)	0
(Croatia) Mislav Karoglan	2 (3)	0	0 (1)	0	0 (0)	0	2 (4)	0
(Argentina) Jonatan Germano	0 (4)	0	1 (0)	0	0 (0)	0	1 (4)	0
(Croatia) Antonini Čulina	2 (3)	1	0 (0)	0	0 (0)	0	2 (3)	1
(Croatia) Marin Datković	0 (1)	0	0 (0)	0	0 (1)	0	0 (2)	0
(Croatia) Ivan Bijelić	0 (3)	0	0 (0)	0	0 (0)	0	0 (3)	0
(Croatia) Dino Raspor	0 (1)	0	0 (0)	0	0 (0)	0	0 (1)	0
(Croatia) Matej Šućurović	0 (1)	0	0 (0)	0	0 (0)	0	0 (1)	0

== See also ==
- 2009–10 Prva HNL
- 2009–10 Croatian Cup
- 2009–10 UEFA Europa League

== External sources ==
- 2009–10 Prva HNL at HRnogomet.com
- 2009–10 Croatian Cup at HRnogomet.com
- Prvenstvo 2009.-2010. at nk-rijeka.hr
