= 2008–09 HNK Rijeka season =

Rijeka
2008–09 season
- Chairman: Dr. Ivan Vanja Frančišković
- Manager: Zlatko Dalić, Mladen Ivančić, Robert Rubčić
- Stadium: Stadion Kantrida
- Prva HNL: 3rd
- Croatian Cup: Quarterfinal
- Intertoto Cup: Round 1
- Top goalscorer: League: Anas Sharbini (14); All: Anas Sharbini, Ahmad Sharbini (17)
- Highest home attendance: 7,000 vs (Croatia) Hajduk Split (10 May 2009 - Prva HNL)
- Lowest home attendance: 300 vs (Croatia) Zagreb (12 November 2008 - Croatian Cup)
- Average home league attendance: 2,429

The 2008–09 season was the 63rd season in Rijeka's history. It was their 18th season in the Prva HNL and 35th successive top tier season.

== Competitions ==
Competition	First match	Last match	Starting round	Final position	Record							
Competition	First match	Last match	Starting round	Final position	G	W	D	L	GF	GA	GD	Win %
Prva HNL	27 July 2008	31 May 2009	Matchday 1	3rd	33	17	5	11	50	44	+6	51.52
Croatian Cup	24 September 2008	26 November 2008	First round	Quarterfinal	4	1	3	0	12	6	+6	25.00
Intertoto Cup	21 June 2008	28 June 2008	First round	First round	2	0	1	1	0	2	−2	0.00
Total					39	18	9	12	62	52	+10	46.15

=== Prva HNL ===
==== Classification ====
Pos	Team	Pld	W	D	L	GF	GA	GD	Pts	Qualification or relegation
1	Dinamo Zagreb (C)	33	23	5	5	71	26	+45	74	Qualification to Champions League second qualifying round
2	Hajduk Split	33	21	5	7	59	25	+34	68	Qualification to Europa League third qualifying round
3	Rijeka	33	17	5	11	50	44	+6	56	Qualification to Europa League second qualifying round
4	Slaven Belupo	33	16	7	10	46	39	+7	55	Qualification to Europa League first qualifying round (Note: Because both cup finalists, Dinamo and Hajduk, qualified for Europe through their league positions, all three UEFA Europa League spots were given to teams according to their league positions, what means that fourth-placed Slaven Belupo also earned a spot in Europa League.)
5	NK Zagreb	33	13	8	12	38	39	−1	47	

Source: Sportnet.hr
Rules for classification: 1) points; 2) goal difference; 3) number of goals scored.
(C) Champions

==== Results summary ====
Overall								Home						Away					
Pld	W	D	L	GF	GA	GD	Pts	W	D	L	GF	GA	GD	W	D	L	GF	GA	GD
33	17	5	11	50	44	+6	56	13	1	3	32	13	+19	4	4	8	18	31	−13

==== Results by round ====
Round	1	2	3	4	5	6	7	8	9	10	11	12	13	14	15	16	17	18	19	20	21	22	23	24	25	26	27	28	29	30	31	32	33
Ground	A	H	A	H	A	H	A	H	A	H	A	H	A	H	A	H	A	H	A	H	A	H	H	A	H	H	A	H	A	H	A	H	A
Result	L	L	D	W	W	W	L	D	W	L	D	W	D	L	L	W	L	W	D	W	L	W	W	L	W	W	W	W	L	W	W	W	L
Position	12	12	12	7	6	2	7	7	4	7	6	4	4	7	8	7	7	5	6	5	6	5	5	5	5	4	4	3	4	4	3	3	3

Source: Competitive matches
A = Away; H = Home; W = Win; D = Draw; L = Loss

== Matches ==
=== Prva HNL ===
Round	Date	Venue	Opponent	Score	Attendance	Rijeka Scorers	Report
1	27 Jul	A	Dinamo Zagreb	0 – 2	6,000		HRnogomet.com
2	3 Aug	H	Zagreb	0 – 1	2,500		HRnogomet.com
3	10 Aug	A	Inter Zaprešić	2 – 2	700	Bodrušić, Budicin	HRnogomet.com
4	17 Aug	H	Hajduk Split	3 – 1	4,000	Čagalj, An. Sharbini, Križman	HRnogomet.com
5	24 Aug	A	Croatia Sesvete	1 – 0	1,500	Ljubović	HRnogomet.com
6	31 Aug	H	Slaven Belupo	2 – 0	2,500	An. Sharbini, Ah. Sharbini	HRnogomet.com
7	14 Sep	A	Cibalia	1 – 3	1,000	Budicin	HRnogomet.com
8	21 Sep	H	Osijek	0 – 0	1,500		HRnogomet.com
9	28 Sep	A	Zadar	3 – 0	2,000	Matko, An. Sharbini (2)	HRnogomet.com
10	5 Oct	H	Šibenik	0 – 1	1,500		HRnogomet.com
11	19 Oct	A	Varteks	3 – 3	1,500	An. Sharbini, Ah. Sharbini (2)	HRnogomet.com
13	2 Nov	A	Zagreb	1 – 1	800	Ah. Sharbini	HRnogomet.com
14	9 Nov	H	Inter Zaprešić	0 – 1	1,500		HRnogomet.com
15	16 Nov	A	Hajduk Split	0 – 2	7,000		HRnogomet.com
12	19 Nov	H	Dinamo Zagreb	1 – 0	3,500	An. Sharbini	HRnogomet.com
16	23 Nov	H	Croatia Sesvete	2 – 1	1,300	Cerić (2)	HRnogomet.com
17	30 Nov	A	Slaven Belupo	1 – 2	500	Križman	HRnogomet.com
18	7 Dec	H	Cibalia	1 – 0	1,000	Fernández	HRnogomet.com
19	22 Feb	A	Osijek	2 – 2	1,500	An. Sharbini, Ah. Sharbini	HRnogomet.com
20	1 Mar	H	Zadar	2 – 1	1,500	Štrok, Ah. Sharbini	HRnogomet.com
21	8 Mar	A	Šibenik	0 – 3	3,000		HRnogomet.com
22	15 Mar	H	Varteks	2 – 1	2,000	Štrok, Cerić	HRnogomet.com
23	22 Mar	H	Croatia Sesvete	3 – 2	1,500	An. Sharbini, Budicin, Cerić	HRnogomet.com
24	5 Apr	A	Zadar	1 – 3	2,000	Ah. Sharbini	HRnogomet.com
25	11 Apr	H	Varteks	4 – 1	2,000	Križman, Ah. Sharbini, Kreilach, An. Sharbini	HRnogomet.com
26	19 Apr	H	Zagreb	2 – 0	1,500	Cerić, Križman	HRnogomet.com
27	22 Apr	A	Šibenik	1 – 0	1,500	Gerc	HRnogomet.com
28	26 Apr	H	Slaven Belupo	6 – 2	4,500	Pamić, An. Sharbini (3), o.g., Ah. Sharbini	HRnogomet.com
29	3 May	A	Dinamo Zagreb	0 – 4	10,000		HRnogomet.com
30	10 May	H	Hajduk Split	2 – 1	7,000	Pamić, Ah. Sharbini	HRnogomet.com
31	17 May	A	Osijek	2 – 1	1,500	Ah. Sharbini (2)	HRnogomet.com
32	24 May	H	Cibalia	2 – 0	2,000	An. Sharbini (2)	HRnogomet.com
33	31 May	A	Inter Zaprešić	0 – 3	800		HRnogomet.com

Source: HRnogomet.com

=== Croatian Cup ===
Round	Date	Venue	Opponent	Score	Attendance	Rijeka Scorers	Report
R1	24 Sep	A	Metalac Sisak	6 – 0	600	Ah. Sharbini (3), An. Sharbini (2), Matko	HRnogomet.com
R2	29 Oct	A	Zadar	2 – 2 (7–6 p)	1,000	Novaković, Ah. Sharbini	HRnogomet.com
QF	12 Nov	H	Zagreb	2 – 2	300	An. Sharbini, Ah. Sharbini	HRnogomet.com
QF	26 Nov	A	Zagreb	2 – 2 (4–6 p)	500	Novaković, Križman	HRnogomet.com

Source: HRnogomet.com

=== Intertoto Cup ===
Round	Date	Venue	Opponent	Score	Attendance	Rijeka Scorers	Report
R1	21 Jun	H	Renova (North Macedonia)	0 – 0	500		HRnogomet.com
R1	28 Jun	AR	Renova (North Macedonia)	0 – 2	2,000		HRnogomet.com

Source: HRnogomet.com

=== Squad statistics ===
Competitive matches only.
Appearances in brackets indicate numbers of times the player came on as a substitute.

Name	Apps	Goals	Apps	Goals	Apps	Goals	Apps	Goals
Name	League		Cup		Europe		Total	
(Croatia) Velimir Radman	25 (0)	0	4 (0)	0	2 (0)	0	31 (0)	0
(Croatia) Dario Bodrušić	14 (3)	1	2 (0)	0	2 (0)	0	18 (3)	1
(Croatia) Alen Pamić	23 (3)	2	2 (1)	0	1 (1)	0	26 (5)	2
(Croatia) Igor Čagalj	13 (5)	1	3 (0)	0	0 (1)	0	16 (6)	1
(Croatia) Fausto Budicin	24 (0)	3	4 (0)	0	2 (0)	0	30 (0)	3
(Croatia) Davor Landeka	24 (3)	0	3 (0)	0	0 (0)	0	27 (3)	0
(Bosnia and Herzegovina) Tarik Cerić	17 (2)	5	1 (1)	0	0 (0)	0	18 (3)	5
(Croatia) Anas Sharbini	27 (0)	14	4 (0)	3	1 (0)	0	32 (0)	17
(Croatia) Hrvoje Štrok	27 (3)	2	4 (0)	0	2 (0)	0	33 (3)	2
(Croatia) Dario Dabac	21 (1)	0	3 (1)	0	0 (0)	0	24 (2)	0
(Croatia) Sandi Križman	16 (12)	4	0 (4)	1	2 (0)	0	18 (16)	5
(Croatia) Ahmad Sharbini	27 (2)	12	3 (0)	5	0 (0)	0	30 (2)	17
(Croatia) Ivan Mance	7 (1)	0	0 (0)	0	0 (0)	0	7 (1)	0
(Argentina) Ramón Ignacio Fernández	11 (11)	1	2 (0)	0	0 (0)	0	13 (11)	1
(Croatia) Igor Novaković	21 (4)	0	3 (1)	2	0 (0)	0	24 (5)	2
(Croatia) Matija Matko	10 (9)	1	3 (0)	1	0 (0)	0	13 (9)	2
(Croatia) Damir Kreilach	7 (6)	1	0 (1)	0	1 (1)	0	8 (8)	1
(Croatia) Vedran Turkalj	8 (5)	0	1 (0)	0	0 (1)	0	9 (6)	0
(Croatia) Darko Miladin	7 (1)	0	0 (0)	0	0 (0)	0	7 (1)	0
(Croatia) Denis Ljubović	6 (2)	1	2 (0)	0	0 (0)	0	8 (2)	1
(Bosnia and Herzegovina) Kenan Čejvanović	6 (1)	0	0 (0)	0	0 (0)	0	6 (1)	0
(Croatia) Filip Tapalović	1 (6)	0	0 (2)	0	0 (0)	0	1 (8)	0
(Croatia) Vedran Gerc	2 (4)	1	0 (0)	0	0 (0)	0	2 (4)	1
(Croatia) Mario Tadejević	1 (3)	0	0 (1)	0	1 (0)	0	2 (4)	0
(Bosnia and Herzegovina) Alen Škoro	3 (1)	0	0 (0)	0	0 (2)	0	3 (3)	0
(Bosnia and Herzegovina) Nedim Halilović	1 (0)	0	0 (0)	0	2 (0)	0	3 (0)	0
(Croatia) Marin Datković	1 (1)	0	0 (0)	0	0 (0)	0	1 (1)	0
(Croatia) Ivan Bijelić	0 (1)	0	0 (0)	0	0 (0)	0	0 (1)	0
(Croatia) Valentino Stepčić	0 (1)	0	0 (0)	0	0 (0)	0	0 (1)	0
(Croatia) Marko Krešić	0 (1)	0	0 (0)	0	0 (0)	0	0 (1)	0
(Croatia) Nikola Šafarić	2 (0)	0	0 (0)	0	1 (0)	0	3 (0)	0
(Croatia) Luka Vučko	0 (0)	0	0 (0)	0	2 (0)	0	2 (0)	0
(Montenegro) Radomir Đalović	0 (0)	0	0 (0)	0	2 (0)	0	2 (0)	0
(Bulgaria) Georgi Ivanov	0 (0)	0	0 (0)	0	1 (0)	0	1 (0)	0

== See also ==
- 2008–09 Prva HNL
- 2008–09 Croatian Cup
- 2008 UEFA Intertoto Cup

== External sources ==
- 2008–09 Prva HNL at HRnogomet.com
- 2008–09 Croatian Cup at HRnogomet.com
- Prvenstvo 2008.-2009. at nk-rijeka.hr
