= 2007–08 HNK Rijeka season =

Rijeka
2007–08 season
- Chairman: Robert Ježić
- Manager: Zlatko Dalić
- Prva HNL: 4th
- Croatian Cup: Round 2
- Top goalscorer: League: Radomir Đalović (18); All: Radomir Đalović (19)
- Highest home attendance: 9,000 vs (Croatia) Dinamo Zagreb (1 March 2008 - Prva HNL)
- Lowest home attendance: 500 vs (Croatia) Varteks (22 March 2008 - Prva HNL)
- Average home league attendance: 3,106

The 2008–09 season was the 62nd season in Rijeka's history. It was their 17th season in the Prva HNL and 34th successive top tier season.

== Competitions ==
Competition	First match	Last match	Starting round	Final position	Record							
Competition	First match	Last match	Starting round	Final position	G	W	D	L	GF	GA	GD	Win %
Prva HNL	20 July 2007	10 May 2008	Matchday 1	4th	33	14	11	8	53	41	+12	42.42
Croatian Cup	26 September 2007	24 October 2007	First round	Second round	2	1	0	1	4	3	+1	50.00
Total					35	15	11	9	57	44	+13	42.86

=== Prva HNL ===
==== Classification ====
Pos	Team	Pld	W	D	L	GF	GA	GD	Pts	Qualification or relegation
2	Slaven Belupo	33	16	6	11	45	29	+16	54	Qualification to UEFA Cup first qualifying round (Note: Hajduk Split qualified for the UEFA Cup as a runner-up of the 2007–08 Croatian Football Cup.)
3	Osijek	33	16	6	11	43	34	+9	54	
4	Rijeka	33	14	11	8	53	41	+12	53	Qualification to Intertoto Cup first round
5	Hajduk Split	33	14	10	9	57	41	+16	52	Qualification to UEFA Cup first qualifying round
6	NK Zagreb	33	11	11	11	51	40	+11	44	

Source: Sportnet.hr
Rules for classification: 1st points; 2nd goal difference; 3rd goals scored
For deciding champions, qualification for the UEFA Cup and relegation: 1st points; 2nd head-to-head points; 3rd head-to-head goal difference; 4th head-to-head away goals scored

==== Results summary ====
Overall								Home						Away					
Pld	W	D	L	GF	GA	GD	Pts	W	D	L	GF	GA	GD	W	D	L	GF	GA	GD
33	14	11	8	53	41	+12	53	11	5	1	39	18	+21	3	6	7	14	23	−9

==== Results by round ====
Round	1	2	3	4	5	6	7	8	9	10	11	12	13	14	15	16	17	18	19	20	21	22	23	24	25	26	27	28	29	30	31	32	33
Ground	A	H	A	H	A	H	A	A	H	A	H	H	A	H	A	H	A	H	H	A	H	A	H	A	H	A	H	A	H	A	H	H	A
Result	W	W	D	W	D	W	W	L	W	L	W	W	L	D	W	W	L	D	W	D	L	D	D	D	D	L	W	L	W	D	D	W	L
Position	3	2	2	2	3	2	2	3	2	2	2	2	2	2	2	2	2	2	2	2	2	2	3	2	4	4	3	4	4	4	3	2	4

Source: Competitive matches
A = Away; H = Home; W = Win; D = Draw; L = Loss

== Matches ==
=== Prva HNL ===
Round	Date	Venue	Opponent	Score	Attendance	Rijeka Scorers	Report
1	20 Jul	A	Inter Zaprešić	1 – 0	2,500	An. Sharbini	HRnogomet.com
2	28 Jul	H	Cibalia	3 – 0	3,000	Ivanov, Đalović, Bule	HRnogomet.com
3	4 Aug	A	Osijek	2 – 2	5,000	Đalović, Bule	HRnogomet.com
4	11 Aug	H	Međimurje	3 – 1	4,000	An. Sharbini (2), Đalović	HRnogomet.com
5	18 Aug	A	Zagreb	2 – 2	2,500	Škoro (2)	HRnogomet.com
6	25 Aug	H	Slaven Belupo	1 – 0	6,000	Đalović	HRnogomet.com
7	1 Sep	A	Varteks	2 – 1	2,000	Škoro, Bule	HRnogomet.com
8	15 Sep	A	Šibenik	2 – 3	2,500	Đalović (2)	HRnogomet.com
9	22 Sep	H	Hajduk Split	4 – 0	8,000	An. Sharbini, Škoro, Ivanov, Đalović	HRnogomet.com
10	29 Sep	A	Dinamo Zagreb	0 – 1	8,000		HRnogomet.com
11	6 Oct	H	Zadar	2 – 0	2,500	Škoro, Pamić	HRnogomet.com
12	20 Oct	H	Inter Zaprešić	2 – 1	2,000	Budicin, Đalović	HRnogomet.com
13	27 Oct	A	Cibalia	0 – 2	1,000		HRnogomet.com
14	31 Oct	H	Osijek	1 – 1	2,000	Đalović	HRnogomet.com
15	3 Nov	A	Međimurje	1 – 0	500	Đalović	HRnogomet.com
16	10 Nov	H	Zagreb	2 – 1	2,500	Đalović (2)	HRnogomet.com
17	24 Nov	A	Slaven Belupo	0 – 1	2,500		HRnogomet.com
18	1 Dec	H	Varteks	1 – 1	1,000	Štrok	HRnogomet.com
19	8 Dec	H	Šibenik	2 – 0	800	Đalović, Štrok	HRnogomet.com
20	23 Feb	A	Hajduk Split	1 – 1	8,000	An. Sharbini	HRnogomet.com
21	1 Mar	H	Dinamo Zagreb	2 – 4	9,000	Škoro, Šafarić	HRnogomet.com
22	8 Mar	A	Zadar	0 – 0	3,500		HRnogomet.com
23	15 Mar	H	Zagreb	1 – 1	2,000	Štrok	HRnogomet.com
24	19 Mar	A	Šibenik	0 – 0	2,000		HRnogomet.com
25	22 Mar	H	Varteks	2 – 2	500	An. Sharbini (2)	HRnogomet.com
26	28 Mar	A	Inter Zaprešić	1 – 2	900	Šafarić	HRnogomet.com
28	12 Apr	A	Osijek	0 – 1	1,000		HRnogomet.com
29	16 Apr	H	Zadar	5 – 3	1,200	Vučko, Đalović (3), An. Sharbini	HRnogomet.com
30	19 Apr	A	Slaven Belupo	1 – 1	2,000	Božić	HRnogomet.com
31	26 Apr	H	Hajduk Split	1 – 1	4,000	An. Sharbini	HRnogomet.com
27	30 Apr	H	Međimurje	5 – 2	1,500	An. Sharbini, Đalović, Božić (2), Škoro	HRnogomet.com
32	6 May	H	Cibalia	2 – 0	1,800	Đalović, An. Sharbini	HRnogomet.com
33	10 May	A	Dinamo Zagreb	1 – 6	20,000	Tadejević	HRnogomet.com

Source: HRnogomet.com

=== Croatian Cup ===
Round	Date	Venue	Opponent	Score	Attendance	Rijeka Scorers	Report
R1	26 Sep	A	Zelina	4 – 0	1,000	An. Sharbini, Ivanov, Đalović, Ramadani	HRnogomet.com
R2	24 Oct	A	Segesta	0 – 3	600		HRnogomet.com

Source: HRnogomet.com

=== Squad statistics ===
Competitive matches only.
Appearances in brackets indicate numbers of times the player came on as a substitute.

Name	Apps	Goals	Apps	Goals	Apps	Goals
Name	League		Cup		Total	
(Serbia) Dragan Žilić	23 (0)	0	1 (0)	0	24 (0)	0
(Croatia) Filip Marčić	28 (1)	0	2 (0)	0	30 (1)	0
(Croatia) Manuel Pamić	18 (0)	1	2 (0)	0	20 (0)	1
(Croatia) Igor Čagalj	15 (3)	0	2 (0)	0	17 (3)	0
(Croatia) Luka Vučko	32 (0)	1	0 (0)	0	32 (0)	1
(Croatia) Fausto Budicin	32 (0)	1	2 (0)	0	34 (0)	1
(Croatia) Anas Sharbini	27 (1)	11	2 (0)	1	29 (1)	12
(Croatia) Hrvoje Štrok	12 (15)	3	0 (2)	0	12 (17)	3
(Croatia) Nino Bule	24 (4)	3	1 (0)	0	25 (4)	3
(Croatia) Nikola Šafarić	26 (5)	2	2 (0)	0	28 (5)	2
(Montenegro) Radomir Đalović	29 (2)	18	2 (0)	1	31 (2)	19
(Bulgaria) Georgi Ivanov	20 (1)	2	1 (0)	1	21 (1)	3
(Bosnia and Herzegovina) Alen Škoro	20 (6)	7	0 (1)	0	20 (7)	7
(Bosnia and Herzegovina) Sergej Jakirović	7 (14)	0	0 (1)	0	7 (15)	0
(Croatia) Dario Jertec	19 (4)	0	2 (0)	0	21 (4)	0
(Croatia) Ivan Božić	5 (13)	3	0 (0)	0	5 (13)	3
(Croatia) Mario Prišć	6 (4)	0	2 (0)	0	8 (4)	0
(Croatia) Velimir Radman	10 (0)	0	1 (0)	0	11 (0)	0
(Croatia) Mate Brajković	4 (6)	0	0 (1)	0	4 (7)	0
(Croatia) Duje Baković	1 (6)	0	0 (0)	0	1 (6)	0
(Croatia) Damir Kreilach	0 (5)	0	0 (0)	0	0 (5)	0
(Croatia) Mario Tadejević	2 (2)	1	0 (0)	0	2 (2)	1
(Croatia) Zedi Ramadani	0 (2)	0	0 (1)	1	0 (3)	1
(Croatia) Vedran Turkalj	1 (0)	0	0 (0)	0	1 (0)	0
(Brazil) André Luiz	1 (1)	0	0 (0)	0	1 (1)	0

== See also ==
- 2007–08 Prva HNL
- 2007–08 Croatian Cup

== External sources ==
- 2007–08 Prva HNL at HRnogomet.com
- 2007–08 Croatian Cup at HRnogomet.com
- Prvenstvo 2007.-2008. at nk-rijeka.hr
