= 2010–11 HNK Rijeka season =

Rijeka
2010–11 season
- Chairman: Ivan Turčić
- Manager: Nenad Gračan, Elvis Scoria
- Stadium: Stadion Kantrida
- Prva HNL: 9th
- Croatian Cup: Quarter-final
- Top goalscorer: League: Hrvoje Štrok (6); All: Hrvoje Štrok (10)
- Highest home attendance: 8,000 vs (Croatia) Hajduk Split (19 September 2010 - Prva HNL)
- Lowest home attendance: 600 vs (Croatia) Međimurje (26 October 2010 - Croatian Cup)
- Average home league attendance: 2,413

The 2010–11 season was the 65th season in Rijeka's history. It was their 20th season in the Prva HNL and 37th successive top tier season.

== Competitions ==
Competition	First match	Last match	Starting round	Final position	Record							
Competition	First match	Last match	Starting round	Final position	G	W	D	L	GF	GA	GD	Win %
Prva HNL	24 July 2010	21 May 2011	Matchday 1	9th	30	9	12	9	29	35	−6	30.00
Croatian Cup	22 September 2010	24 November 2010	First round	Quarterfinal	4	2	0	2	10	9	+1	50.00
Total					34	11	12	11	39	44	−5	32.35

=== Prva HNL ===
==== Classification ====
Pos	Team	Pld	W	D	L	GF	GA	GD	Pts	Qualification or relegation
7	Slaven Belupo	30	10	10	10	34	30	+4	40	
8	Osijek	30	9	12	9	31	29	+2	39	
9	Rijeka	30	9	12	9	29	35	−6	39	
10	Zadar	30	11	5	14	31	34	−3	38	
11	Varaždin	30	9	9	12	32	38	−6	36	Qualification to Europa League first qualifying round (Note: Champions League-bound Dinamo Zagreb won the 2010–11 Croatian Cup, so cup runners-up Varaždin will enter the first qualifying round of UEFA Europa League.)

Source: Prva-HNL.hr
Rules for classification: 1) points; 2) goal difference; 3) number of goals scored.
For deciding champions, qualification to UEFA Europa League and relegation: 1st points; 2nd head-to-head points; 3rd head-to-head goal difference; 4th head-to-head away goals scored

==== Results summary ====
Overall								Home						Away					
Pld	W	D	L	GF	GA	GD	Pts	W	D	L	GF	GA	GD	W	D	L	GF	GA	GD
30	9	12	9	29	35	−6	39	5	5	5	15	16	−1	4	7	4	14	19	−5

==== Results by round ====
Round	1	2	3	4	5	6	7	8	9	10	11	12	13	14	15	16	17	18	19	20	21	22	23	24	25	26	27	28	29	30
Ground	H	A	H	H	A	H	A	H	A	H	A	H	A	H	A	A	H	A	A	H	A	H	A	H	A	H	A	H	A	H
Result	W	W	W	D	W	W	L	L	L	W	D	L	D	L	L	W	L	D	L	D	W	D	D	D	D	W	D	D	D	L
Position	7	2	1	2	2	1	1	4	5	4	4	7	6	6	8	6	6	7	8	9	7	7	6	7	10	7	7	8	8	9

Source: Competitive matches
A = Away; H = Home; W = Win; D = Draw; L = Loss

== Matches ==
=== Prva HNL ===
Round	Date	Venue	Opponent	Score	Attendance	Rijeka Scorers	Report
1	24 Jul	H	RNK Split	1 – 0	2,000	o.g.	HRnogomet.com
2	31 Jul	A	Dinamo Zagreb	2 – 1	3,500	Rodić, o.g.	HRnogomet.com
3	7 Aug	H	Hrvatski Dragovoljac	3 – 0	3,000	Štrok (2), Đalović	HRnogomet.com
4	14 Aug	H	Varaždin	1 – 1	3,000	Rodić	HRnogomet.com
5	21 Aug	A	Karlovac	1 – 0	2,500	Švrljuga	HRnogomet.com
6	28 Aug	H	Slaven Belupo	2 – 1	2,000	Štrok, Kreilach	HRnogomet.com
7	11 Sep	A	Cibalia	1 – 4	1,500	Đalović	HRnogomet.com
8	19 Sep	H	Hajduk Split	0 – 1	8,000		HRnogomet.com
9	26 Sep	A	Zagreb	1 – 3	400	Đalović	HRnogomet.com
10	2 Oct	H	Lokomotiva	3 – 0	1,500	Rodić, Kreilach, Čaval	HRnogomet.com
11	16 Oct	A	Istra 1961	0 – 0	2,500		HRnogomet.com
12	23 Oct	H	Osijek	1 – 5	3,000	Štrok	HRnogomet.com
13	30 Oct	A	Šibenik	1 – 1	1,200	Budicin	HRnogomet.com
14	6 Nov	H	Inter Zaprešić	0 – 2	1,000		HRnogomet.com
15	13 Nov	A	Zadar	0 – 1	2,000		HRnogomet.com
16	20 Nov	A	RNK Split	3 – 2	1,000	Štrok, Đalović (2)	HRnogomet.com
17	27 Nov	H	Dinamo Zagreb	0 – 2	4,500		HRnogomet.com
18	3 Dec	A	Hrvatski Dragovoljac	2 – 2	700	Vukman, Štrok	HRnogomet.com
19	26 Feb	A	Varaždin	0 – 3	800		HRnogomet.com
20	5 Mar	H	Karlovac	0 – 0	1,000		HRnogomet.com
21	12 Mar	A	Slaven Belupo	1 – 0	1,500	Čulina	HRnogomet.com
22	19 Mar	H	Cibalia	0 – 0	1,000		HRnogomet.com
23	2 Apr	A	Hajduk Split	1 – 1	5,000	Budicin	HRnogomet.com
24	9 Apr	H	Zagreb	1 – 1	1,200	Pilčić	HRnogomet.com
25	15 Apr	A	Lokomotiva	0 – 0	100		HRnogomet.com
26	23 Apr	H	Istra 1961	2 – 0	1,500	Vukman, Čulina	HRnogomet.com
27	30 Apr	A	Osijek	0 – 0	1,500		HRnogomet.com
28	7 May	H	Šibenik	1 – 1	2,500	Čulina	HRnogomet.com
29	13 May	A	Inter Zaprešić	1 – 1	500	Čulina	HRnogomet.com
30	21 May	H	Zadar	0 – 2	1,000		HRnogomet.com

Source: HRnogomet.com

=== Croatian Cup ===
Round	Date	Venue	Opponent	Score	Attendance	Rijeka Scorers	Report
R1	22 Sep	A	Nosteria	4 – 2	1,000	Križman (2), Čulina (2)	HRnogomet.com
R2	26 Oct	H	Međimurje	3 – 1	600	Đalović (2), Štrok	HRnogomet.com
QF	9 Nov	A	Varaždin	1 – 2	300	Štrok	HRnogomet.com
QF	24 Nov	H	Varaždin	2 – 4	1,500	Štrok (2)	HRnogomet.com

Source: HRnogomet.com

=== Squad statistics ===
Competitive matches only.
Appearances in brackets indicate numbers of times the player came on as a substitute.

Name	Apps	Goals	Apps	Goals	Apps	Goals
Name	League		Cup		Total	
(Croatia) Robert Lisjak	30 (0)	0	2 (0)	0	32 (0)	0
(Croatia) Andro Švrljuga	25 (3)	1	4 (0)	0	29 (3)	1
(Croatia) Igor Čagalj	24 (0)	0	4 (0)	0	28 (0)	0
(Croatia) Fausto Budicin	28 (2)	2	4 (0)	0	32 (2)	2
(Croatia) Davor Landeka	24 (4)	0	3 (0)	0	27 (4)	0
(Croatia) Kristijan Čaval	22 (2)	1	2 (0)	0	24 (2)	1
(Croatia) Duje Baković	21 (0)	0	4 (0)	0	25 (0)	0
(Croatia) Hrvoje Štrok	29 (0)	6	3 (0)	4	32 (0)	10
(Croatia) Damir Kreilach	27 (1)	2	3 (0)	0	30 (1)	2
(Montenegro) Radomir Đalović	20 (0)	5	3 (0)	2	23 (0)	7
(Croatia) Antonini Čulina	14 (5)	4	1 (3)	2	15 (8)	6
(Croatia) Neven Vukman	14 (5)	1	1 (1)	0	15 (6)	1
(Croatia) Sandi Križman	7 (11)	0	3 (0)	2	10 (11)	2
(Croatia) Ivan Rodić	12 (1)	3	2 (1)	0	14 (2)	3
(Croatia) Valentino Stepčić	2 (13)	0	3 (1)	0	5 (14)	0
(Croatia) Dražen Pilčić	7 (4)	1	0 (0)	0	7 (4)	1
(Croatia) Anton Rukavina	4 (7)	0	0 (1)	0	4 (8)	0
(Montenegro) Milan Đurišić	5 (4)	0	0 (0)	0	5 (4)	0
(Croatia) Denis Ljubović	5 (1)	0	0 (0)	0	5 (1)	0
(Croatia) Vedran Gerc	3 (8)	0	0 (3)	0	3 (11)	0
(Belgium) Mikael Yourassowsky	5 (2)	0	0 (0)	0	5 (2)	0
(Netherlands) Sergio Zijler	1 (3)	0	0 (0)	0	1 (3)	0
(Croatia) Tomislav Pelin	0 (0)	0	2 (0)	0	2 (0)	0
(Croatia) Ivan Bijelić	0 (2)	0	0 (0)	0	0 (2)	0
(Croatia) Mato Miloš	1 (0)	0	0 (0)	0	1 (0)	0

== See also ==
- 2010–11 Prva HNL
- 2010–11 Croatian Cup

== External sources ==
- 2010–11 Prva HNL at HRnogomet.com
- 2010–11 Croatian Cup at HRnogomet.com
- Prvenstvo 2010.-2011. at nk-rijeka.hr
