= 2014–15 HNK Rijeka season =

Rijeka
2014–15 season
- Chairman: Damir Mišković
- Manager: Matjaž Kek
- Stadium: Stadion Kantrida
- Prva HNL: 2nd
- Croatian Cup: Semi-final
- UEFA Europa League: Group stage
- Croatian Supercup: Winner
- Top goalscorer: League: Andrej Kramarić (21); All: Andrej Kramarić (28)
- Highest home attendance: 9,500 v Dinamo (22 April 2015)
- Lowest home attendance: 3,000 v Istra 1961 (26 April 2015)
- Average home league attendance: 5,244
Home colours	Away colours	Third colours

The 2014–15 HNK Rijeka season was the 69th season in its history. It was their 24th successive season in the Prva HNL, and 41st successive top tier season.

== Competitions ==
=== Overall ===
Competition	First match	Last match	Starting round	Final position	Record							
Competition	First match	Last match	Starting round	Final position	G	W	D	L	GF	GA	GD	Win %
Prva HNL	20 Jul 2014	29 May 2015	Matchday 1	Second	36	22	9	5	76	29	+47	61.11
Croatian Cup	15 Oct 2014	22 Apr 2015	First round	Semi-final	6	4	1	1	16	5	+11	66.67
UEFA Europa League	17 Jul 2014	11 Dec 2014	QR2	Group stage	12	8	1	3	23	10	+13	66.67
Croatian Supercup	11 Jul 2014	11 Jul 2014	Final	Winner	1	1	0	0	2	1	+1	100.00
Total					55	35	11	9	117	45	+72	63.64

Last updated: 29 May 2015.

=== Prva HNL ===
==== Classification ====
Pos	Team	Pld	W	D	L	GF	GA	GD	Pts	Qualification or relegation
1	Dinamo Zagreb (C)	36	26	10	0	85	21	+64	88	Qualification to Champions League second qualifying round
2	Rijeka	36	22	9	5	76	29	+47	75	Qualification to Europa League second qualifying round
3	Hajduk Split (Note: Hajduk Split were deducted 3 points for not showing up for the match against Dinamo Zagreb in the 16th round.)	36	15	8	13	59	56	+3	50	Qualification to Europa League first qualifying round
4	Lokomotiva	36	13	7	16	59	68	−9	46	Qualification to Europa League first qualifying round
5	NK Zagreb	36	13	7	16	45	54	−9	46	

Source: Sportnet.hr
Rules for classification: 1) points; 2) goal difference; 3) number of goals scored.
For deciding champions, qualification to UEFA Europa League and relegation: 1st points; 2nd head-to-head points; 3rd head-to-head goal difference; 4th head-to-head away goals scored
(C) Champions

==== Results summary ====
Overall								Home						Away					
Pld	W	D	L	GF	GA	GD	Pts	W	D	L	GF	GA	GD	W	D	L	GF	GA	GD
36	22	9	5	76	29	+47	75	14	3	1	56	12	+44	8	6	4	20	17	+3

Last updated: 29 May 2015.
Source: Sportnet.hr

==== Results by round ====
Round	1	2	3	4	5	6	7	8	9	10	11	12	13	14	15	16	17	18	19	20	21	22	23	24	25	26	27	28	29	30	31	32	33	34	35	36
Ground	A	H	A	A	H	A	H	A	H	H	A	H	H	A	H	A	H	A	A	H	A	A	H	A	H	A	H	H	A	H	H	A	H	A	H	A
Result	W	W	W	W	W	L	W	W	L	W	D	W	D	D	W	W	W	L	W	W	D	D	D	L	W	D	D	W	W	W	W	D	W	W	W	L
Position	3	2	2	2	2	2	2	2	2	2	2	2	2	2	2	2	2	2	2	2	2	2	2	2	2	2	2	2	2	2	2	2	2	2	2	2

Updated to match(es) played on 29 May 2015. Source: Competitive matches
A = Away; H = Home; W = Win; D = Draw; L = Loss

==== Results by opponent ====
Team	Results				Points
Team	1	2	3	4	Points
Dinamo Zagreb	1–2	0–3	2–2	0–4	1
Hajduk Split	4–2	1–1	3–0	2–1	10
Istra 1961	1–0	3–1	0–0	3–0	10
Lokomotiva	1–2	6–0	0–1	5–0	6
Osijek	1–0	2–1	0–0	3–0	10
Slaven Belupo	3–0	1–1	1–1	1–1	6
RNK Split	3–0	1–1	1–1	2–0	8
Zadar	6–1	1–0	4–0	2–0	12
NK Zagreb	3–1	3–0	2–1	4–1	12

Source: 2014–15 Croatian First Football League article

=== UEFA Europa League ===
==== Group stage ====
Pos	Team	Pld	W	D	L	GF	GA	GD	Pts	Qualification	FEY	SEV	RIJ	STA
1	(Netherlands) Feyenoord	6	4	0	2	10	6	+4	12	Advance to knockout phase	—	2–0	2–0	2–1
2	(Spain) Sevilla	6	3	2	1	8	5	+3	11	Advance to knockout phase	2–0	—	1–0	3–1
3	(Croatia) Rijeka	6	2	1	3	7	8	−1	7		3–1	2–2	—	2–0
4	(Belgium) Standard Liège	6	1	1	4	4	10	−6	4		0–3	0–0	2–0	—

Source: Soccerway
Rules for classification: Group stage tiebreakers

== Matches ==
=== Prva HNL ===
20 July 2014 1	Zagreb	1–3	Rijeka	Zagreb
19:00 CEST (UTC+02:00)	Boban 48'	Report	Kramarić 56' (pen.) 71'; Ajayi 64' (yellow card) 68'; Jajalo (yellow card) 77'	Stadium: Stadion Kranjčevićeva; Attendance: 1,000; Referee: Tihomir Pejin (Donji Miholjac)

27 July 2014 2	Rijeka	4–2	Hajduk Split	Rijeka
21:00 CEST (UTC+02:00)	Kramarić 10', 21', 30'; Sharbini 40'; Brezovec (yellow card) 71'	Report	Kouassi 13'; Maloča (yellow card) 41'; Caktaš 83'	Stadium: Stadion Kantrida; Attendance: 9,000; Referee: Mario Zebec (Cestica)

4 August 2014 3	Istra 1961	0–1	Rijeka	Pula
20:15 CEST (UTC+02:00)	Ivančić (yellow card) 56'; Obšivač (yellow card) 63'; Huseinbašić (yellow card) 77'; Woon (yellow card) 79'	Report	Leovac (yellow card) 45'; Tomečak (yellow card) 64'; Krstanović 78' (pen.); Kvržić (yellow card) 82'	Stadium: Stadion Aldo Drosina; Attendance: 5,000; Referee: Zlatko Šimčić (Koprivnica)

10 August 2014 4	RNK Split	0–3	Rijeka	Split
21:00 CEST (UTC+02:00)	Cikalleshi (yellow card) 59'	Report	Leovac 1'; Lešković (yellow card) 30'; Kramarić 55', 73'; Krstanović (yellow card) 61'; Tomečak (yellow card) 86'	Stadium: Stadion Park Mladeži; Attendance: 1,800; Referee: Fran Jović (Zagreb)

16 August 2014 5	Rijeka	3–0	Slaven Belupo	Rijeka
19:00 CEST (UTC+02:00)	Tomečak 8'; Kramarić 9', 36'	Report		Stadium: Stadion Kantrida; Attendance: 4,000; Referee: Duje Strukan (Split)

24 August 2014 6	Lokomotiva	2–1	Rijeka	Zagreb
19:00 CEST (UTC+02:00)	Šovšić 71' (pen.); Pavičić 82'	Report	Leovac (yellow card) 37'; Samardžić (red card) 69'; Jajalo (yellow card) 69'; Prskalo (yellow card) 71'; Jahović 75'	Stadium: Stadion Kranjčevićeva; Attendance: 1,000; Referee: Tihomir Pejin (Donji Miholjac)

31 August 2014 7	Rijeka	6–1	Zadar	Rijeka
21:00 CEST (UTC+02:00)	Kramarić 13'; Tomečak 20' (yellow card) 90+1'; Moisés 30', 38', 88'; Cvijanović 85'	Report	Terkeš 16'	Stadium: Stadion Kantrida; Attendance: 4,000; Referee: Marko Matoc (Zaprešić)

13 September 2014 8	Osijek	0–1	Rijeka	Osijek
16:00 CEST (UTC+02:00)	Jonjić (yellow card) 57'	Report	Jugović 19'; Jajalo (yellow card) 24'; Lešković (yellow card) 44'; Bertoša (yellow card) 73'; Krstanović (yellow card) 74'	Stadium: Stadion Gradski vrt Attendance: 1,500; Referee: Mario Zebec (Cestica)

21 September 2014 9	Rijeka	1–2	Dinamo Zagreb	Rijeka
19:00 CEST (UTC+02:00)	Leovac (yellow card) 16'; Kramarić 58'; Sharbini (yellow card) 82'	Report	Soudani 33', 69'; Pivarić (yellow card) 53'; Šimunić (yellow card) 55'	Stadium: Stadion Kantrida; Attendance: 9,000; Referee: Ante Vučemilović-Šimunović (Osijek)

27 September 2014 10	Rijeka	3–0	Zagreb	Rijeka
19:00 CEST (UTC+02:00)	Kramarić 22', 26'; Krstanović 47'	Report	Kolinger (yellow card) 43'; Musa (yellow card) 52'	Stadium: Stadion Kantrida; Attendance: 4,500; Referee: Goran Gabrilo (Split)

5 October 2014 11	Hajduk Split	1–1	Rijeka	Dugopolje
16:00 CEST (UTC+02:00)	Caktaš 21' (pen.); Maloča (yellow card) 45+3'; Milić (yellow card) 51'; Gotal (yellow card) 52'; Vuković (yellow card) 87'; Mezga (yellow card) 90+1'	Report	Leovac (yellow card) 27'; Kvržić 64'; Mitrović (yellow card) 85'	Stadium: Stadion Hrvatski vitezovi Attendance: 5,500; Referee: Fran Jović (Zagreb)

18 October 2014 12	Rijeka	3–1	Istra 1961	Rijeka
19:00 CEST (UTC+02:00)	Jajalo (yellow card) 53' (goal) 54'; Kramarić 71'; Zec 90'	Report	Woon (yellow card) 29'; Tomić 44'; Pavlović (yellow card) 50'; Jô (yellow card) 83'	Stadium: Stadion Kantrida; Attendance: 5,000; Referee: Bruno Marić (Daruvar)

26 October 2014 13	Rijeka	1–1	RNK Split	Rijeka
19:00 CEST (UTC+02:00)	Kramarić 55'	Report	Roce (yellow card) 24'; Rugašević (yellow card) 30'; Ibriks 44'; Kvesić (yellow card) 49'; Cikalleshi (yellow card) 66'; Dujmović (yellow card) 85'	Stadium: Stadion Kantrida; Attendance: 4,500; Referee: Dalibor Mlakar (Zagreb)

1 November 2014 14	Slaven Belupo	1–1	Rijeka	Koprivnica
19:00 CET (UTC+01:00)	Ozobić (yellow card) 22' (goal) 60'; Purić (yellow card) 65'; Crepulja (yellow card) 80'; Dujmović (yellow card) 85'	Report	Kramarić 35' (pen.); Vešović (yellow card) 81'	Stadium: Gradski stadion Attendance: 2,200; Referee: Goran Gabrilo (Split)

9 November 2014 15	Rijeka	6–0	Lokomotiva	Rijeka
19:00 CET (UTC+01:00)	Kramarić 21', 22', 38', 49', 62'; Tomečak (yellow card) 47'; Kvržić (yellow card) 78'; Ivančić 84'	Report	Begonja (yellow card) 40'	Stadium: Stadion Kantrida; Attendance: 5,100; Referee: Tihomir Pejin (Donji Miholjac)

22 November 2014 16	Zadar	0–1	Rijeka	Zadar
17:00 CET (UTC+01:00)	Hrgović (yellow card) 40'; Šimurina (yellow card) 90+3'	Report	Močinić (yellow card) 25'; Jugović (yellow card) 40'; Moisés 61'; Sharbini (yellow card) 69'	Stadium: Stadion Stanovi; Attendance: 1,500; Referee: Damir Batinić (Osijek)

1 December 2014 17	Rijeka	2–1	Osijek	Rijeka
18:00 CET (UTC+01:00)	Samardžić 12' (yellow card) 71'; Moisés 62'; Močinić (yellow card) 69'	Report	Glavaš (yellow card) 47'; Jonjić 73'; Šorša (yellow card) 86'; Mioč (yellow card) 90'	Stadium: Stadion Kantrida; Attendance: 4,000; Referee: Duje Strukan (Split)

6 December 2014 18	Dinamo Zagreb	3–0	Rijeka	Zagreb
15:00 CET (UTC+01:00)	Ademi 40'; Henríquez 52'; Pivarić (yellow card) 59'; Brozović (yellow card) 63'; Čop 86'	Report	Kvržić (yellow card) 59'; Lešković (yellow card) 90+2'	Stadium: Stadion Maksimir; Attendance: 3,122; Referee: Mario Zebec (Cestica)

15 December 2014 19	Zagreb	1–2	Rijeka	Zagreb
18:00 CET (UTC+01:00)	Stepčić 23'; Medić (yellow card) 31'; Kolinger (yellow card) 44'	Report	Sharbini 1'; Močinić (red card) 21'; Štiglec 63' (o.g.); Bertoša (yellow card) 75'	Stadium: Stadion Kranjčevićeva; Attendance: 1,000; Referee: Bruno Marić (Daruvar)

15 February 2015 21	Istra 1961	0–0	Rijeka	Pula
15:00 CET (UTC+01:00)	Jô (yellow card) 83'	Report	Samardžić (yellow card) 26'; Radošević (yellow card) 74'	Stadium: Stadion Aldo Drosina; Attendance: 3,000; Referee: Goran Gabrilo (Split)

18 February 2015 20	Rijeka	3–0	Hajduk Split	Rijeka
17:00 CET (UTC+01:00)	Jugović 2', 85'; Balaj 13'	Report	Sušić (yellow card) 65'; Maloku (yellow card) 85'; Maloča (yellow card) 89'	Stadium: Stadion Kantrida; Attendance: 7,500; Referee: Mario Zebec (Cestica)

22 February 2015 22	RNK Split	1–1	Rijeka	Split
17:00 CET (UTC+01:00)	Glavina (yellow card) 24'; Kvesić 29' (yellow card) 55'; Mršić (yellow card) 29'; Roce (yellow card) 52'; Rugašević (yellow card) 80'	Report	Jugović (yellow card) 17'; Balaj (penalty missed) 25' 57'	Stadium: Stadion Park Mladeži; Attendance: 300; Referee: Dalibor Mlakar (Zagreb)

28 February 2015 23	Rijeka	1–1	Slaven Belupo	Rijeka
17:00 CET (UTC+01:00)	Álex 33'	Report	Parlov 32'; Grgić (yellow card) 40'; Gregurina (yellow card) 50'; Brlek (yellow card) 85'	Stadium: Stadion Kantrida; Attendance: 4,500; Referee: Mario Matoc (Zaprešić)

9 March 2015 24	Lokomotiva	1–0	Rijeka	Zagreb
18:00 CET (UTC+01:00)	Leko 90' (pen.); Doležal (yellow card) 90+2'; Gržan (yellow card) 90+3'	Report	Radošević (yellow card) 66'; Vešović (yellow card) 89'	Stadium: Stadion Kranjčevićeva; Attendance: 500; Referee: Igor Križarić (Čakovec)

15 March 2015 25	Rijeka	4–0	Zadar	Rijeka
17:00 CET (UTC+01:00)	Balaj 26'; Hristov 30', 56'; Sharbini (yellow card) 30'; Leovac 36' (yellow card) 64'	Report	Jurkić (yellow card) 35'; Mišić (yellow card) 70'	Stadium: Stadion Kantrida; Attendance: 5,200; Referee: Željko Frković (Gospić)

20 March 2015 26	Osijek	0–0	Rijeka	Osijek
18:00 CET (UTC+01:00)	Jamak (yellow card) 38'; Kurtović (yellow card) 61'; Barišić (yellow card) 80'	Report	Mitrović (yellow card) 83'	Stadium: Stadion Gradski vrt Attendance: 2,000; Referee: Marijo Strahonja (Zagreb)

4 April 2015 27	Rijeka	2–2	Dinamo Zagreb	Rijeka
17:00 CEST (UTC+02:00)	Jugović (yellow card) 25'; Balaj 30'; Bradarić (yellow card) 57'; Sharbini (yellow card) 60'; Močinić (yellow card) 64'; Radošević 90+4'	Report	Taravel (yellow card) 27'; Pjaca 46'; Sigali 82'; Fernandes (red card) 82'; Pinto (yellow card) 89'; Vukojević (yellow card) 90+4'	Stadium: Stadion Kantrida; Attendance: 6,600; Referee: Marijo Strahonja (Zagreb)

14 April 2015 28	Rijeka	4–1	Zagreb	Rijeka
19:00 CEST (UTC+02:00)	Tomečak 37'; Balaj 43'; Mitrović 59'; Lešković (yellow card) 74'; Tomasov 82'	Report	Jurendić 57' (pen.); Ljubičić (yellow card) 84'	Stadium: Stadion Kantrida; Attendance: 5,000; Referee: Duje Strukan (Split)

18 April 2015 29	Hajduk Split	1–2	Rijeka	Split
17:00 CEST (UTC+02:00)	Gotal (yellow card) 1'; Tudor 44'; Milović (yellow card) 61'; Qurbanov (yellow card) 90+2'	Report	Tomečak 80'; Vešović 82'	Stadium: Stadion Poljud; Attendance: 6,500; Referee: Dalibor Mlakar (Zagreb)

26 April 2015 30	Rijeka	3–0	Istra 1961	Rijeka
19:00 CEST (UTC+02:00)	Tomasov 28', 59'; Álex 33'	Report		Stadium: Stadion Kantrida; Attendance: 3,000; Referee: Tihomir Pejin (Donji Miholjac)

29 April 2015 31	Rijeka	2–0	RNK Split	Rijeka
18:00 CEST (UTC+02:00)	Lešković (yellow card) 45'; Samardžić (yellow card) 71'; Tomasov 76'; Glavina 90+1' (o.g.)	Report	Vidović (yellow card) 29'; Roce (yellow card) 59'; Galović (yellow card) 83'	Stadium: Stadion Kantrida; Attendance: 4,000; Referee: Željko Frković (Gospić)

4 May 2015 32	Slaven Belupo	1–1	Rijeka	Koprivnica
19:00 CEST (UTC+02:00)	Mišić 2'; Jambor (yellow card) 65'	Report	Balaj 4'; Bradarić (yellow card) 41'	Stadium: Gradski stadion Attendance: 2,000; Referee: Dalibor Mlakar (Zagreb)

10 May 2015 33	Rijeka	5–0	Lokomotiva	Rijeka
19:00 CEST (UTC+02:00)	Tomasov 25', 31'; Balaj 36'; Bradarić 45'; Sharbini 69'	Report	Mamić (yellow card) 44'; Mrčela (yellow card) 80'	Stadium: Stadion Kantrida; Attendance: 4,500; Referee: Goran Gabrilo (Split)

17 May 2015 34	Zadar	0–2	Rijeka	Zadar
19:00 CEST (UTC+02:00)	Milinković (yellow card) 25'; Banović (yellow card) 38'; Gabrić (yellow card) 65'; Krstanović (yellow card) 71'	Report	Bradarić (yellow card) 22'; Balaj 45+2'; Vešović (yellow card) 50'; Samardžić 63'	Stadium: Stadion Stanovi; Attendance: 1,500; Referee: Tihomir Pejin (Donji Miholjac)

23 May 2015 35	Rijeka	3–0	Osijek	Rijeka
18:00 CEST (UTC+02:00)	Balaj 18'; Sharbini 34' (pen.); Leovac (yellow card) 50'; Tomasov 66'	Report	Bralić (red card) 61'	Stadium: Stadion Kantrida; Attendance: 5,500; Referee: Marin Vidulin (Kanfanar)

29 May 2015 36	Dinamo Zagreb	4–0	Rijeka	Zagreb
19:00 CEST (UTC+02:00)	Pjaca 2', 64' (pen.); Taravel 28'; Soudani 73'	Report	Bradarić (yellow card) 31'; Mitrović (yellow card) 63'; Radošević (yellow card) 88'	Stadium: Stadion Maksimir; Attendance: 14,878; Referee: Goran Gabrilo (Split)

Source: HRnogomet.com

=== Croatian Cup ===
15 October 2014 R1	Lekenik	2–4	Rijeka	Sisak
15:00 CEST (UTC+02:00)	Kovačević 9' (pen.); Celjak (yellow card) 19'; Mihael Bezić (yellow card) 38'; Marić (yellow card) 42'; Gajdek (yellow card) 44'; Đurđek 74'	Report	Zec 6', 52'; Jajalo 36'; Zlomislić (yellow card) 67'; Krstanović 69'; Cvijanović (yellow card) 85'	Stadium: Gradski stadion Attendance: 400; Referee: Damir Batinić (Osijek)

29 October 2014 R2	GOŠK Dubrovnik	0–3	Rijeka	Dubrovnik
14:00 CEST (UTC+02:00)	Kovačić (yellow card) 55'; Kacić (red card) 61'	Report	Bertoša 6'; Lešković 25'; Samardžić 54'; Krstanović (red card) 88'	Stadium: Stadion Lapad; Attendance: 1,000; Referee: Goran Gabrilo (Split)

11 February 2015 QF	Rijeka	4–1	Lokomotiva	Rijeka
17:00 CEST (UTC+02:00)	Tomečak 18'; Bradarić (yellow card) 39'; Radošević (yellow card) 58'; Balaj 59'; Sharbini (yellow card) 67'; Leovac (yellow card) 75'; Jugović 77'; Lešković 89'	Report	Gržan (yellow card) 66'; Pavičić (yellow card) 68'; Mamić (yellow card) 74'; Doležal 85'	Stadium: Stadion Kantrida; Attendance: 5,500; Referee: Bruno Marić (Daruvar)

4 March 2015 QF	Lokomotiva	0–4 (1–8 agg.)	Rijeka	Zagreb
17:00 CEST (UTC+02:00)		Report	Sharbini 36'; Vešović 39'; Tomasov 51'; Ivančić 77'	Stadium: Stadion Kranjčevićeva; Attendance: 400; Referee: Tihomir Pejin (Donji Miholjac)

8 April 2015 SF	Dinamo Zagreb	2–1	Rijeka	Zagreb
18:00 CEST (UTC+02:00)	Machado 70'; Henríquez (yellow card) 75' (goal) 81'; Sigali (yellow card) 84'	Report	Lešković 6' (yellow card) 32'; Sharbini (yellow card) 11'; Leovac (yellow card) 11'; Mitrović (yellow card) 35'; Bradarić (yellow card) 41'; Vargić (yellow card) 65'	Stadium: Stadion Maksimir; Attendance: 3,100; Referee: Bruno Marić (Daruvar)

22 April 2015 SF	Rijeka	0–0 (1–2 agg.)	Dinamo Zagreb	Rijeka
18:30 CEST (UTC+02:00)	Vešović (yellow card) 34' (red card) 81'; Sharbini (yellow card) 55'; Samardžić (yellow card) 55'; Lešković (yellow card) 61'; Jugović (red card) 81'; Leovac (red card) 90+2'	Report	Taravel (yellow card) 41'; Soudani (yellow card) 83'	Stadium: Stadion Kantrida; Attendance: 8,000; Referee: Mario Zebec (Cestica)

Source: HRnogomet.com.

=== UEFA Europa League ===
17 July 2014 QR2	Rijeka (Croatia)	1–0	(Hungary) Ferencváros	Rijeka, Croatia
20:30 CEST (UTC+02:00)	Mitrović (yellow card) 6'; Krstanović (yellow card) 21' (goal) 85' (pen.)	Report	Pavlović (yellow card) 55'; Nalepa (yellow card) 65'; Mateos (yellow card) 75'	Stadium: Stadion Kantrida; Attendance: 9,000; Referee: Tobias Stieler (Germany)

24 July 2014 QR2	Ferencváros (Hungary)	1–2 (1–3 agg.)	(Croatia) Rijeka	Budapest, Hungary
20:30 CEST (UTC+02:00)	Mateos (yellow card) 49'; Lauth (yellow card) 58'; Ugrai 65' (yellow card) 68'; Gyömbér (yellow card) 75'	Report	Krstanović 20' (pen.) (red card) 54'; Brezovec (yellow card) 30'; Samardžić 37' (yellow card) 65'; Jajalo (yellow card) 42'; Sharbini (yellow card) 84'	Stadium: Ferenc Puskás Stadium; Attendance: 5,147; Referee: Paolo Valeri (Italy)

31 July 2014 QR3	Víkingur (Faroe Islands)	1–5	(Croatia) Rijeka	Tórshavn, Faroe Islands
20:00 CEST (UTC+02:00)	Hansson 35'; Vatnhamar (yellow card) 81'; Gregersen (yellow card) 90'	Report	Lešković 14'; Kvržić 45+1', 76'; Jahović 51'; Kramarić 81' (pen.)	Stadium: Tórsvøllur; Attendance: 1,203; Referee: Dimitar Mečkarovski (Macedonia)

7 August 2014 QR3	Rijeka (Croatia)	4–0 (9–1 agg.)	(Faroe Islands) Víkingur	Rijeka, Croatia
21:15 CEST (UTC+02:00)	Jahović 39', 48', 64'; Ajayi (yellow card) 51'; Jacobsen 77' (o.g.)	Report	Jacobsen (yellow card) 39'; Olsen (yellow card) 45'	Stadium: Stadion Kantrida; Attendance: 5,036; Referee: Vitali Meshkov (Russia)

21 August 2014 PO	Rijeka (Croatia)	1–0	(Moldova) Sheriff Tiraspol	Rijeka, Croatia
21:15 CEST (UTC+02:00)	Jajalo (yellow card) 23'; Leovac 85'; Sharbini (yellow card) 87'	Report	Galvão (yellow card) 29'; Isa (yellow card) 51'; Metoua (yellow card) 58'; Olímpio (yellow card) 82'	Stadium: Stadion Kantrida; Attendance: 9,020; Referee: Serge Gumienny (Belgium)

28 August 2014 PO	Sheriff Tiraspol (Moldova)	0–3 (0–4 agg.)	(Croatia) Rijeka	Tiraspol, Moldova
19:00 CEST (UTC+02:00)	Potiguar (yellow card) 82'; Galvão (yellow card) 86'	Report	Ligger 29' (o.g.); Kramarić 44'; Moisés 61'; Zlomislić (yellow card) 84'	Stadium: Sheriff Stadium; Attendance: 4,853; Referee: Jorge Sousa (Portugal)

18 September 2014 GS	Standard Liège (Belgium)	2–0	(Croatia) Rijeka	Liège, Belgium
21:05 CEST (UTC+02:00)	De Sart (yellow card) 53'; M'Poku (yellow card) 70'; Ciman 74'; Araújo (yellow card) 86' (goal) 87'	Report	Kvržić (yellow card) 8'; Samardžić (yellow card) 45+1'; Krstanović (yellow card) 64'; Leovac (yellow card) 89'; Ivančić (yellow card) 90'	Stadium: Stade Maurice Dufrasne; Attendance: 8,894; Referee: Cristian Balaj (Romania)

2 October 2014 GS	Rijeka (Croatia)	2–2	(Spain) Sevilla	Rijeka, Croatia
19:00 CEST (UTC+02:00)	Cvijanović (yellow card) 13'; Kvržić (yellow card) 19' (goal) 68'; Kramarić 53' (pen.)	Report	Aspas 26'; Kolodziejczak (red card) 52'; Navarro (yellow card) 87'; Mbia 90+1'	Stadium: Stadion Kantrida; Attendance: 9,256; Referee: Kenn Hansen (Denmark)

23 October 2014 GS	Rijeka (Croatia)	3–1	(Netherlands) Feyenoord	Rijeka, Croatia
19:00 CEST (UTC+02:00)	Kramarić 63', 71', 76' (pen.); Leovac (yellow card) 68'; Jajalo (yellow card) 77'	Report	Wilkshire (yellow card) 32'; Nelom (yellow card) 53'; Toornstra 66'; Clasie (yellow card) 90+2'	Stadium: Stadion Kantrida; Attendance: 9,326; Referee: Tom Harald Hagen (Norway)

6 November 2014 GS	Feyenoord (Netherlands)	2–0	(Croatia) Rijeka	Rotterdam, Netherlands
21:05 CEST (UTC+02:00)	El Ahmadi (yellow card) 8' (goal) 28'; Immers 20' (yellow card) 85'	Report	Sharbini (yellow card) 15'; Samardžić (yellow card) 30'; Leovac (yellow card) 67'	Stadium: De Kuip; Attendance: 30,800; Referee: Craig Thomson (Scotland)

27 November 2014 GS	Rijeka (Croatia)	2–0	(Belgium) Standard Liège	Rijeka, Croatia
19:00 CEST (UTC+02:00)	Moisés 26'; Kramarić 34' (pen.) (yellow card) 90+2'; Cvijanović (yellow card) 78'; Mitrović (yellow card) 90'	Report	Arslanagic (red card) 33'; De Sart (yellow card) 81'	Stadium: Stadion Kantrida; Attendance: 8,950; Referee: Stephan Studer (Switzerland)

11 December 2014 GS	Sevilla (Spain)	1–0	(Croatia) Rijeka	Sevilla, Spain
21:05 CEST (UTC+02:00)	Vitolo (yellow card) 14'; Suárez 20'; Mbia (yellow card) 37'; Bacca (yellow card) 53'; Pareja (yellow card) 88'	Report	Močinić (yellow card) 61'; Vešović (yellow card) 74'; Tomečak (yellow card) 76'; Ivančić (yellow card) 90'	Stadium: Ramón Sánchez Pizjuán Stadium; Attendance: 24,967; Referee: Manuel Gräfe (Germany)

Source: uefa.com

=== Croatian Supercup ===
11 July 2014 Final	Dinamo Zagreb	1–2	Rijeka	Rijeka
20:30 CEST (UTC+02:00)	Leko (yellow card) 11'; Ademi (yellow card) 31'; Sigali 39'; Pjaca (yellow card) 51'; Radonjić (yellow card) 90+3'	Report	Samardžić 21'; Mitrović (yellow card) 38'; Moisés 70'; Krstanović (yellow card) 87'	Stadium: Stadion Kantrida; Attendance: 7,500; Referee: Zlatko Šimčić (Koprivnica)

Sources: HRnogomet.com

=== Friendlies ===
==== Pre-season ====
13 June 2014 Friendly	Rijeka	5–2	Stupnik	Vrata
	Sharbini 33'; Jahović 44'; Tadić 55', 77'; Kvržić 68'	Report	Zelenika 21'; Štulec 38'	Stadium: Igralište Gmajna; Attendance: 300; Referee: Slaven Skender (Rijeka)

20 June 2014 Friendly	Lovran	0–8	Rijeka	Lovran
		Report	Tadić 4'; Jahović 35', 38'; Brezovec 47'; Okechukwu 50'; Filipović 52'; Ajayi 55', 80'	Stadium: Igralište Lokva; Attendance: 1,000; Referee: Vladimir Merle (Rijeka)

27 June 2014 Friendly	Koper (Slovenia)	2–4	(Croatia) Rijeka	Kranjska Gora, Slovenia
	Štromajer 8'; Štulac 77'	Report	Krstanović 12', 32'; Kvržić 17'; Jahović 49'	Stadium: Športni park Rudeč; Attendance: 30; Referee: Nejc Kajtazovič (Kranj)

1 July 2014 Friendly	Triglav Kranj (Slovenia)	1–4	(Croatia) Rijeka	Kranj, Slovenia
	Poplatnik 24'	Report	Kramarić 8' (pen.); Jugović 54'; Jajalo 75'; Tadić 80'	Stadium: Stanko Mlakar Stadium; Attendance: 200; Referee: Nejc Kajtazovič (Kranj)

5 July 2014 Friendly	Domžale (Slovenia)	0–1	(Croatia) Rijeka	Domžale, Slovenia
		Report	Moisés 18'	Stadium: Domžale Sports Park; Referee: Boris Tošeski (Medvode)

==== On-season ====
9 September 2014 Friendly	Halubjan	0–3	Rijeka	Viškovo
		Report	Krstanović 13', 45'; Jajalo 73' (pen.)	Stadium: Igralište Brnasi; Attendance: 500; Referee: Danijel Trbulin (Rijeka)

==== Mid-season ====
15 January 2015 Friendly	Koper (Slovenia)	2–1	(Croatia) Rijeka	Koper, Slovenia
	Rahmanović 42'; Ščulac 75'	Report	Leovac 86'	Stadium: Bonifika Stadium; Attendance: 700; Referee: Damir Skomina (Koper)

21 January 2015 Friendly	Rijeka (Croatia)	1–1	(Germany) Ingolstadt 04	Mijas, Spain
	Knežević 87'	Report	Lex 59'	Stadium: La Cala Resort

28 January 2015 Friendly	Rijeka (Croatia)	1–2	(Bulgaria) Ludogorets Razgrad	Mijas, Spain
	Tomasov 29'	Report	Moți 45' (pen.); Bezjak 50'	Stadium: La Cala Resort

31 January 2015 Friendly	Rijeka (Croatia)	1–4	(Ukraine) Dnipro Dnipropetrovsk	Mijas, Spain
	Mitrović 66'	Report	Cheberyachko 14'; Matheus 71'; Kalinić 77', 89'	Stadium: La Cala Resort

7 February 2015 Friendly	Rijeka	5–1	Opatija	Rijeka
	Radošević 25'; Balaj 28'; Álex 38'; Ajayi 65'; Cvijanović 88'	Report	Rudan 82'	Stadium: Stadion Kantrida; Attendance: 1,500; Referee: Marko Linić (Dražice)

== Player seasonal records ==
Competitive matches only. Updated to games played 29 May 2015.

=== Goals ===
Rank	Name	League	Europe	Cup	Supercup	Total
1	(Croatia) Andrej Kramarić	21	7	–	–	28
2	(Albania) Bekim Balaj	9	–	1	–	10
3	(Croatia) Marin Tomasov	7	–	1	–	8
3	(Brazil) Moisés	5	2	–	1	8
5	(Croatia) Anas Sharbini	4	–	1	–	5
5	(Croatia) Ivan Tomečak	4	–	1	–	5
5	(Croatia) Ivan Krstanović	2	2	1	–	5
5	(Slovenia) Miral Samardžić	2	1	1	1	5
5	(North Macedonia) Adis Jahović	1	4	–	–	5
10	(Croatia) Vedran Jugović	3	–	1	–	4
10	(Bosnia and Herzegovina) Zoran Kvržić	1	3	–	–	4
10	(Croatia) Marko Lešković	–	1	3	–	4
13	(Austria) Marin Leovac	2	1	–	–	3
13	(Bosnia and Herzegovina) Ermin Zec	1	–	2	–	3
15	(Spain) Álex Fernández	2	–	–	–	2
15	(Bulgaria) Ventsislav Hristov	2	–	–	–	2
15	(Croatia) Josip Ivančić	1	–	1	–	2
15	(Croatia) Mato Jajalo	1	–	1	–	2
15	(Montenegro) Marko Vešović	1	–	1	–	2
20	(Nigeria) Goodness Ajayi	1	–	–	–	1
20	(Croatia) Filip Bradarić	1	–	–	–	1
20	(Slovenia) Goran Cvijanović	1	–	–	–	1
20	(Croatia) Matej Mitrović	1	–	–	–	1
20	(Croatia) Josip Radošević	1	–	–	–	1
20	(Croatia) Mateo Bertoša	–	–	1	–	1
20	Own goals	2	2	–	–	4
TOTALS		76	23	16	2	117

Source: Competitive matches

=== Assists ===
Rank	Name	League	Europe	Cup	Supercup	Total
1	(Croatia) Anas Sharbini	13	1	2	–	16
2	(Croatia) Mato Jajalo	7	2	1	–	10
3	(Austria) Marin Leovac	6	2	1	–	9
3	(Bosnia and Herzegovina) Zoran Kvržić	5	1	3	–	9
5	(Croatia) Filip Bradarić	5	–	3	–	8
5	(Croatia) Josip Brezovec	3	4	–	1	8
7	(Croatia) Vedran Jugović	6	–	–	–	6
8	(Croatia) Andrej Kramarić	2	3	–	–	5
9	(Brazil) Moisés Lima Magalhães	3	–	–	–	3
9	(Croatia) Ivan Tomečak	3	–	–	–	3
9	(Croatia) Josip Radošević	3	–	–	–	3
9	(Croatia) Josip Mišić	2	–	1	–	3
9	(Croatia) Marin Tomasov	2	–	1	–	3
9	(Croatia) Ivan Krstanović	2	–	–	1	3
15	(Albania) Bekim Balaj	2	–	–	–	2
15	(Nigeria) Goodness Ajayi	1	1	–	–	2
15	(North Macedonia) Adis Jahović	1	1	–	–	2
15	(Slovenia) Goran Cvijanović	1	–	1	–	2
15	(Croatia) Ivan Boras	–	2	–	–	2
20	(Croatia) Mateo Bertoša	1	–	–	–	1
20	(Spain) Álex Fernández	1	–	–	–	1
20	(Croatia) Josip Ivančić	1	–	–	–	1
20	(Croatia) Ivan Močinić	1	–	–	–	1
20	(Croatia) Ivan Vargić	–	1	–	–	1
20	(Croatia) Matej Mitrović	–	–	1	–	1
20	(Montenegro) Marko Vešović	–	–	1	–	1
TOTALS		71	18	15	2	106

Source: Competitive matches

=== Clean sheets ===
Rank	Name	League	Europe	Cup	Supercup	Total
1	(Croatia) Ivan Vargić	12	4	1	–	17
2	(Croatia) Andrej Prskalo	4	1	2	–	7
TOTALS		16	5	3	0	24

Source: Competitive matches

=== Disciplinary record ===
Number	Position	Name	1. HNL (Note: Two yellow cards resulting in a red are counted as a total of three cards - i.e. two yellow and one red card.)		Europe		Croatian Cup		Supercup		Total	
Number	Position	Name	Booked	Sent off (straight red)	Booked	Sent off (straight red)	Booked	Sent off (straight red)	Booked	Sent off (straight red)	Booked	Sent off (straight red)
8	MF	(Croatia) Mato Jajalo	5	0	3	0	0	0	0	0	8	0
10	MF	(Croatia) Anas Sharbini	4	0	3	0	3	0	0	0	10	0
11	DF	(Croatia) Ivan Tomečak	4	0	1	0	0	0	0	0	5	0
13	DF	(Croatia) Marko Lešković	5	0	0	0	2	0	0	0	7	0
14	MF	(Slovenia) Goran Cvijanović	0	0	2	0	1	0	0	0	3	0
15	DF	(Croatia) Matej Mitrović	3	0	2	0	1	0	1	0	7	0
16	MF	(Croatia) Ivan Močinić	5	1	1	0	0	0	0	0	6	1
17	FW	(Nigeria) Ajayi	1	0	1	0	0	0	0	0	2	0
18	MF	(Croatia) Filip Bradarić	4	0	0	0	2	0	0	0	6	0
19	DF	(Slovenia) Miral Samardžić	3	1	3	0	1	0	0	0	7	1
20	MF	(Bosnia and Herzegovina) Zoran Kvržić	3	0	2	0	0	0	0	0	5	0
21	MF	(Bosnia and Herzegovina) Damir Zlomislić	1	0	1	0	1	0	0	0	3	0
22	DF	(Austria) Marin Leovac	6	0	3	0	2	1	0	0	11	1
24	DF	(Croatia) Mateo Bertoša	2	0	0	0	0	0	0	0	2	0
25	GK	(Croatia) Ivan Vargić	0	0	0	0	1	0	0	0	1	0
28	FW	(Croatia) Josip Ivančić	0	0	2	0	0	0	0	0	2	0
29	DF	(Montenegro) Marko Vešović	3	0	1	0	1	1	0	0	5	1
30	MF	(Croatia) Josip Brezovec	1	0	1	0	0	0	0	0	2	0
32	GK	(Croatia) Andrej Prskalo	1	0	0	0	0	0	0	0	1	0
33	MF	(Croatia) Josip Radošević	3	0	0	0	1	0	0	0	4	0
89	MF	(Croatia) Vedran Jugović	3	0	0	0	0	1	0	0	3	1
91	FW	(Croatia) Andrej Kramarić	0	0	1	0	0	0	0	0	1	0
99	FW	(Croatia) Ivan Krstanović	2	0	4	1	2	1	1	0	9	2
TOTALS			59	2	31	1	18	4	2	0	110	7

Source: nk-rijeka.hr

=== Appearances and goals ===
Number	Position	Player	Apps	Goals	Apps	Goals	Apps	Goals	Apps	Goals	Apps	Goals
Number	Position	Player	Total		1. HNL (Note: First number represents appearances in starting eleven, while the second number indicates a substitute appearance.)		Europa League		Croatian Cup		Supercup	
4	DF	(Bosnia and Herzegovina) Jozo Špikić	1	0	0+1	0	0+0	0	0+0	0	0+0	0
5	DF	(Croatia) Dario Knežević	2	0	2+0	0	0+0	0	0+0	0	0+0	0
6	DF	(Croatia) Fausto Budicin	1	0	0+0	0	0+0	0	1+0	0	0+0	0
7	MF	(Croatia) Dario Čanađija	3	0	0+1	0	0+2	0	0+0	0	0+0	0
7	DF	(Portugal) Rúben Lima	3	0	0+2	0	0+0	0	1+0	0	0+0	0
7	MF	(Croatia) Marin Tomasov	18	8	10+5	7	0+0	0	1+2	1	0+0	0
8	MF	(Spain) Álex Fernández	11	2	9+0	2	0+0	0	1+1	0	0+0	0
8	MF	(Croatia) Mato Jajalo	33	2	15+3	1	12+0	0	2+0	1	1+0	0
9	FW	(Albania) Bekim Balaj	18	10	15+0	9	0+0	0	3+0	1	0+0	0
9	FW	(North Macedonia) Adis Jahović	8	5	3+1	1	3+1	4	0+0	0	0+0	0
9	FW	(Bosnia and Herzegovina) Ermin Zec	5	3	0+3	1	0+0	0	2+0	2	0+0	0
10	MF	(Croatia) Anas Sharbini	43	5	26+3	4	8+1	0	4+0	1	1+0	0
11	DF	(Croatia) Ivan Tomečak	48	5	32+1	4	11+0	0	3+0	1	1+0	0
13	DF	(Croatia) Marko Lešković	41	4	26+1	0	9+0	1	5+0	3	0+0	0
14	DF	(Croatia) Ivan Boras	1	0	0+0	0	1+0	0	0+0	0	0+0	0
14	MF	(Slovenia) Goran Cvijanović	27	1	7+8	1	4+4	0	1+3	0	0+0	0
15	DF	(Croatia) Matej Mitrović	36	1	23+2	1	7+1	0	2+0	0	1+0	0
16	MF	(Croatia) Ivan Močinić	26	0	11+8	0	2+0	0	4+1	0	0+0	0
17	FW	(Nigeria) Goodness Ohiremen Ajayi	13	1	2+8	1	1+1	0	0+1	0	0+0	0
18	MF	(Croatia) Filip Bradarić	17	1	15+0	1	0+0	0	2+0	0	0+0	0
19	DF	(Slovenia) Miral Samardžić	36	5	20+2	2	8+1	1	4+0	1	1+0	1
20	FW	(Bulgaria) Ventsislav Hristov	7	2	3+3	2	0+0	0	0+1	0	0+0	0
20	MF	(Bosnia and Herzegovina) Zoran Kvržić	32	4	9+8	1	6+6	3	2+0	0	0+1	0
21	MF	(Bosnia and Herzegovina) Damir Zlomislić	16	0	3+7	0	1+4	0	1+0	0	0+0	0
22	DF	(Austria) Marin Leovac	44	3	29+0	2	9+0	1	4+1	0	1+0	0
24	DF	(Croatia) Mateo Bertoša	11	1	6+3	0	1+0	0	1+0	1	0+0	0
25	GK	(Croatia) Ivan Vargić	43	0	28+0	0	11+0	0	3+0	0	1+0	0
27	MF	(Croatia) Josip Mišić	15	0	5+6	0	0+0	0	1+3	0	0+0	0
28	FW	(Croatia) Josip Ivančić	18	2	2+10	1	0+2	0	1+3	1	0+0	0
29	DF	(Montenegro) Marko Vešović	27	2	8+9	1	2+3	0	4+1	1	0+0	0
30	MF	(Croatia) Josip Brezovec	12	0	6+0	0	5+0	0	0+0	0	1+0	0
30	FW	(Croatia) Filip Dangubić	1	0	0+1	0	0+0	0	0+0	0	0+0	0
32	GK	(Croatia) Andrej Prskalo	12	0	8+0	0	1+0	0	3+0	0	0+0	0
33	MF	(Croatia) Josip Radošević	20	1	12+4	1	0+0	0	4+0	0	0+0	0
88	MF	(Brazil) Moisés Lima Magalhães	22	8	9+3	5	7+2	2	0+0	0	1+0	1
89	MF	(Croatia) Vedran Jugović	44	4	25+1	3	10+2	0	4+1	1	1+0	0
91	FW	(Croatia) Andrej Kramarić	31	28	18+0	21	10+2	7	0+0	0	0+1	0
99	FW	(Croatia) Ivan Krstanović	21	5	8+3	2	3+4	2	2+0	1	1+0	0

=== Penalties ===
For
Date	Competition	Player	Opposition	Scored?
17 Jul 2014	UEL	(Croatia) Ivan Krstanović	Ferencváros	✓
20 Jul 2014	1. HNL	(Croatia) Andrej Kramarić	NK Zagreb	✓
24 Jul 2014	UEL	(Croatia) Ivan Krstanović	Ferencváros	✓
31 Jul 2014	UEL	(Croatia) Andrej Kramarić	Víkingur	✓
4 Aug 2014	1. HNL	(Croatia) Ivan Krstanović	Istra 1961	✓
2 Oct 2014	UEL	(Croatia) Andrej Kramarić	Sevilla	✓
23 Oct 2014	UEL	(Croatia) Andrej Kramarić	Feyenoord	✓
1 Nov 2014	1. HNL	(Croatia) Andrej Kramarić	Slaven Belupo	✓
27 Nov 2014	UEL	(Croatia) Andrej Kramarić	Standard Liège	✓
22 Feb 2015	1. HNL	(Albania) Bekim Balaj	RNK Split	✗
23 May 2015	1. HNL	(Croatia) Anas Sharbini	Osijek	✓
Against
Date	Competition	Player	Opposition	Scored?
24 Aug 2014	1. HNL	(Croatia) Andrej Prskalo	Lokomotiva	✓
5 Oct 2014	1. HNL	(Croatia) Ivan Vargić	Hajduk Split	✓
9 Oct 2014	Cup	(Croatia) Andrej Prskalo	Lekenik	✓
9 Mar 2015	1. HNL	(Croatia) Andrej Prskalo	Lokomotiva	✓
14 Apr 2015	1. HNL	(Croatia) Ivan Vargić	NK Zagreb	✓
25 May 2015	1. HNL	(Croatia) Ivan Vargić	Dinamo Zagreb	✓

=== Overview of statistics ===
Statistic	Overall	Prva HNL	Croatian Cup	Europa League
Most appearances	Tomečak (48)	Tomečak (33)	5 players (5)	4 players (12)
Most starts	Tomečak (47)	Tomečak (32)	Lešković (5)	Jajalo (12)
Most substitute appearances	Kvržić, Cvijanović & Ivančić (15)	Ivančić (10)	3 players (3)	Kvržić (6)
Most minutes played	Tomečak (4173)	Tomečak (2835)	Lešković (450)	Vargić (990)
Top goalscorer	Kramarić (28)	Kramarić (21)	Lešković (3)	Kramarić (7)
Most assists	Sharbini (16)	Sharbini (13)	Kvržić & Bradarić (3)	Brezovec (4)
Most yellow cards	Leovac (11)	Leovac (6)	Sharbini (3)	Krstanović (4)
Most red cards	Krstanović (2)	Samardžić & Močinić (1)	4 players (1)	Krstanović (1)
Last updated: 29 May 2015.

== Transfers ==
=== In ===
Date	Pos.	Player	Moving from	Type	Fee
26 May 2014	CB	(Bosnia and Herzegovina) Jozo Špikić	(Bosnia and Herzegovina) Široki Brijeg	Transfer	€70,000
1 Jun 2014	CF	(North Macedonia) Adis Jahović	(Ukraine) Vorskla Poltava	Transfer	Free
24 Jun 2014	CM	(Croatia) Mato Jajalo	(Germany) Köln	Transfer	Free
26 Jun 2014	AM	(Croatia) Mislav Oršić	(Italy) Spezia	Transfer	Free
30 Jun 2014	CB	(Croatia) Ricardo Bagadur	(Croatia) Pomorac	Return from loan	—N/a
30 Jun 2014	LB	(Nigeria) Jamilu Collins	(Croatia) Pomorac	Return from loan	—N/a
30 Jun 2014	CF	(Croatia) Filip Dangubić	(Croatia) Pomorac	Return from loan	—N/a
30 Jun 2014	AM	(Nigeria) Aliyu Okechukwu	(Croatia) Pomorac	Return from loan	—N/a
4 Jul 2014	CB	(Croatia) Fausto Budicin	(Croatia) Istra 1961	Transfer	Free
8 Jul 2014	CB	(Slovenia) Miral Samardžić	(Moldova) Sheriff Tiraspol	Transfer	€150,000
16 Jul 2014	CM	(Croatia) Dario Čanađija	(Croatia) Slaven Belupo	Transfer	€350,000
6 Aug 2014	AM	(Argentina) Lucas Scaglia	(Colombia) Deportivo Cali	Transfer	Free
8 Aug 2014	CM	(Slovenia) Goran Cvijanović	(Slovenia) Maribor	Transfer	€100,000
26 Aug 2014	CF	(Croatia) Josip Ivančić	(Croatia) Zadar	Transfer	€50,000
1 Sep 2014	LB	(Portugal) Rúben Lima	(Croatia) Dinamo Zagreb	Loan (until 15/6/2015)	—N/a
1 Sep 2014	RB	(Montenegro) Marko Vešović	(Italy) Torino	Loan (until 30/6/2015)	—N/a
18 Sep 2014	CF	(Bosnia and Herzegovina) Ermin Zec	(Turkey) Gençlerbirliği	Transfer	Free
31 Dec 2014	CM	(Croatia) Josip Mišić	(Croatia) Osijek	Transfer	€250,000
9 Jan 2015	CF	(Albania) Bekim Balaj	(Czech Republic) Slavia Prague	Transfer	€100,000
10 Jan 2015	RW	(Croatia) Marin Tomasov	(Germany) 1860 München	Transfer	Free
23 Jan 2015	CF	(Bulgaria) Ventsislav Hristov	(Bulgaria) Beroe Stara Zagora	Transfer	€80,000
23 Jan 2015	RB	(Croatia) Mihael Rebernik	(Croatia) Međimurje	Transfer	€50,000
29 Jan 2015	CM	(Spain) Álex Fernández	(Spain) Espanyol	Loan (until 30/6/2015; option to buy)	—N/a
3 Feb 2015	CM	(Croatia) Filip Bradarić	(Croatia) Hajduk Split	Transfer	€300,000
4 Feb 2015	DM	(Croatia) Josip Radošević	(Italy) Napoli	Loan (until 31/12/2015; option to buy)	—N/a
16 Feb 2015	CF	(Croatia) Mate Bajić	(Croatia) Cibalia	Transfer	€50,000

Source: Glasilo Hrvatskog nogometnog saveza

=== Out ===
Date	Pos.	Player	Moving to	Type	Fee
6 Jun 2014	CB	(Croatia) Mato Neretljak	—N/a	Retirement	—N/a
13 Jun 2014	RW	(Croatia) Goran Mujanović	(Kuwait) Al-Nasr	Transfer	Free
13 Jun 2014	CM	(Croatia) Nikola Pokrivač	(Kazakhstan) Shakhter Karagandy	Transfer	€50,000
16 Jul 2014	CF	(Croatia) Josip Tadić	(Austria) Sturm Graz	Transfer	Free
1 Aug 2014	CF	(Croatia) Danijel Cesarec	(Croatia) Slaven Belupo	Transfer	Free
5 Aug 2014	CB	(Croatia) Luka Marić	(Poland) Zawisza Bydgoszcz	Transfer	Free
8 Aug 2014	RB	(Croatia) Ivan Boras	(Croatia) Dinamo Zagreb	Transfer	€100,000
18 Aug 2014	RB	(Croatia) Mato Miloš	(Italy) Spezia	Loan (until 30/6/2015)	—N/a
19 Aug 2014	CM	(Croatia) Domagoj Pušić	(Croatia) Zadar	Loan (until 15/6/2015)	—N/a
19 Aug 2014	CF	(Nigeria) Solomon Theophilus	(Croatia) Zadar	Loan (until 15/6/2015)	—N/a
31 Aug 2014	AM	(Croatia) Mislav Oršić	(Slovenia) Celje	Loan (until 15/6/2015)	—N/a
1 Sep 2014	GK	(Croatia) Simon Sluga	(Croatia) Lokomotiva	Loan (until 15/6/2015)	—N/a
1 Sep 2014	DM	(Croatia) Josip Brezovec	(Italy) Spezia	Loan (until 30/6/2015)	—N/a
1 Sep 2014	CM	(Croatia) Dario Čanađija	(Italy) Spezia	Loan (until 15/6/2016)	—N/a
1 Sep 2014	CF	(North Macedonia) Adis Jahović	(Russia) Krylia Sovetov	Transfer	€400,000
1 Sep 2014	CB	(Croatia) Ricardo Bagadur	(Italy) Fiorentina	Transfer	€500,000
9 Sep 2014	CM	(Croatia) Diego Živulić	(Czech Republic) Fastav Zlín	Transfer	Free
15 Dec 2014	LB	(Portugal) Rúben Lima	(Croatia) Dinamo Zagreb	End of loan	—N/a
31 Dec 2014	AM	(Croatia) Mislav Oršić	(South Korea) Jeonnam Dragons	Loan (until 31/12/2015; option to buy)	—N/a
9 Jan 2015	AM	(Argentina) Lucas Scaglia	(United States) Jacksonville Armada	Transfer	Free
10 Jan 2015	AM	(Bosnia and Herzegovina) Mehmed Alispahić	(Bosnia and Herzegovina) Sarajevo	Transfer	Free
11 Jan 2015	RW	(Bosnia and Herzegovina) Zoran Kvržić	(Italy) Spezia	Loan (until 30/6/2015)	—N/a
13 Jan 2015	AM	(Nigeria) Aliyu Okechukwu	(Croatia) Zadar	Loan (until 15/6/2015)	—N/a
15 Jan 2015	RM	(Croatia) Drago Gabrić	(Croatia) Zadar	Loan (until 15/6/2015)	—N/a
16 Jan 2015	CF	(Croatia) Andrej Kramarić	(England) Leicester City	Transfer	£9.7 million
26 Jan 2015	CF	(Bosnia and Herzegovina) Ermin Zec	(Turkey) Balıkesirspor	Transfer	€100,000
28 Jan 2015	CM	(Croatia) Mato Jajalo	(Italy) Palermo	Transfer	Undisclosed
1 Feb 2015	CF	(Croatia) Andrija Filipović	(Italy) Juventus U19	Loan (until 30/6/2015)	—N/a
10 Feb 2015	DM	(Bosnia and Herzegovina) Damir Zlomislić	(Romania) Brașov	Loan (until 15/6/2015)	—N/a
11 Feb 2015	CB	(Bosnia and Herzegovina) Jozo Špikić	(Croatia) Osijek	Loan (until 15/6/2015)	—N/a
16 Feb 2015	GK	(Nigeria) Ayotunde Ikuepamitan	(Croatia) Varaždin	Loan (until 15/6/2015)	—N/a
2 Mar 2015	CF	(Croatia) Ivan Krstanović	(Croatia) Zadar	Transfer	Free

Source: Glasilo Hrvatskog nogometnog saveza

Spending: ▼€1,550,000
Income: ▲€14,100,000
Expenditure: ▲€12,550,000
