= Andrej Prskalo =

Croatian footballer

Personal information
- Full name: Andrej Prskalo
- Date of birth: 1 May 1987 (age 39)
- Place of birth: Labin, SFR Yugoslavia
- Height: 1.86 m (6 ft 1 in)
- Position: Goalkeeper

Team information
- Current team: Opatija
- Number: 32

Youth career
- ?–2001: Jedinstvo Omladinac
- 2001–2005: Rudar Labin
- 2005–2006: Rijeka

Senior career*
| Years | Team | Apps | (Gls) |
| 2005–2010 | Rijeka | 0 | (0) |
| 2006 | → Rudar Labin (loan) | | |
| 2007–2008 | → Orijent (loan) | 33 | (0) |
| 2009–2010 | → Pomorac (loan) | 39 | (0) |
| 2010–2013 | Istra 1961 | 43 | (0) |
| 2014–2022 | Rijeka | 107 | (0) |
| 2022– | Opatija | 55 | (0) |

International career^{‡}
| 2017 | Croatia | 1 | (0) |
- * Club domestic league appearances and goals as of 17 September 2024 ‡ National team caps and goals as of 14 January 2017

Andrej Prskalo (Croatian pronunciation: [ǎndrej př̩ːskalo]; born 1 May 1987) is a Croatian football goalkeeper, who plays for NK Opatija.

== Career ==
=== Early years in HNK Rijeka ===
Prskalo signed his first professional contract with HNK Rijeka on 5 August 2005. During his first season at the club they won the 2006 Croatian Cup. Prskalo was the third choice goalkeeper and did not play a single match. During his next four seasons at the club he was loaned out to low tier clubs NK Rudar Labin, NK Pomorac Kostrena and NK Orijent Rijeka.

=== NK Istra 1961 ===
On 2 July 2010 Prskalo signed to NK Istra 1961 on a free transfer.

Prskalo played his first match during the first match of the season against Hajduk Split coming in as a substitute for Igor Lovrić who had conceded five goals. The match ended 6:1 for Hajduk with Prskalo conceding a goal from a penalty kick in the '81 minute.

Prskalo competed in 49 competitive matches for Istra.

=== HNK Rijeka ===
On 14 January 2014 Prskalo returned to HNK Rijeka on a free transfer.

Prskalo made his debut for the club 5 days later on 19 January in a friendly match against Videoton FC in which the match ended in 2:2 draw. He made his competitive debut for the club on 10 May against Lokomotiva Zagreb in 1:5 win for HNK Rijeka. Prskalo spent the next two seasons as a substitute for Ivan Vargić playing 18 matches in official competitions.

He played his first European match during the Third qualifying round of the 2014-15 Europa League against Víkingur Gøta. Rijeka won the match 4:0. Prskalo played in a notable 3:0 win against Hajduk Split on 18 February 2015. The match was the last Adriatic derby to be played on Rijeka's stadium Kantrida.

At the beginning of the 2016–17 season Prskalo became the first choice goalkeeper for the club. During the season due to the injury of captain Mate Maleš Prskalo captained his side to winning the clubs first league title and first double. Prskalo was the best goalkeeper of the league that season having 21 clean sheets. Prskalo missed out on the next season due to a muscle injury. He was only able to play 14 matches in all competitions and was replaced by Simon Sluga.

=== International ===
He made his debut and played his sole international game for Croatia in a January 2017 China Cup match against the hosts.

== Personal life ==
His father Mirko was also a football player. He is the nephew of former handball player Mladen Prskalo.

== Career statistics ==
=== Club ===
| Season | Club | League | | | Cup^{1} | | Continental^{2} | | Other^{3} | | Total | |
| Season | Club | Division | Apps | Goals | Apps | Goals | Apps | Goals | Apps | Goals | Apps | Goals |
|---|---|---|---|---|---|---|---|---|---|---|---|---|
| 2005–06 | Rijeka | Prva HNL | – | | – | | – | | – | | 0 | 0 |
| 2006–07 | Rijeka | Prva HNL | – | | – | | – | | 1 | 0 | 1 | 0 |
| 2007–08 | Rijeka | Prva HNL | – | | – | | – | | 4 | 0 | 4 | 0 |
| 2008–09 | Rijeka | Prva HNL | – | | – | | – | | 3 | 0 | 3 | 0 |
| 2009–10 | Rijeka | Prva HNL | – | | – | | – | | 4 | 0 | 4 | 0 |
| 2006–07 | Rudar Labin (loan) | Treća HNL | – | | 1 | 0 | – | | – | | 1 | 0 |
| Rudar Labin total | | | 0 | 0 | 1 | 0 | 0 | 0 | 0 | 0 | 1 | 0 |
| 2007–08 | Orijent (loan) | Treća HNL | 33 | 0 | – | | – | | – | | 33 | 0 |
| Orijent total | | | 33 | 0 | 0 | 0 | 0 | 0 | 0 | 0 | 33 | 0 |
| 2008–09 | Pomorac (loan) | Druga HNL | 10 | 0 | – | | – | | – | | 10 | 0 |
| 2009–10 | Pomorac (loan) | Druga HNL | 29 | 0 | 2 | 0 | – | | – | | 31 | 0 |
| Pomorac total | | | 39 | 0 | 2 | 0 | 0 | 0 | 0 | 0 | 41 | 0 |
| 2010–11 | Istra 1961 | Prva HNL | 4 | 0 | 1 | 0 | – | | 13 | 0 | 18 | 0 |
| 2011–12 | Istra 1961 | Prva HNL | 13 | 0 | 4 | 0 | – | | 7 | 0 | 24 | 0 |
| 2012–13 | Istra 1961 | Prva HNL | 19 | 0 | 1 | 0 | – | | 6 | 0 | 26 | 0 |
| 2013–14 | Istra 1961 | Prva HNL | 5 | 0 | 2 | 0 | – | | 3 | 0 | 10 | 0 |
| Istra 1961 total | | | 41 | 0 | 8 | 0 | 0 | 0 | 29 | 0 | 78 | 0 |
| 2013–14 | Rijeka | Prva HNL | 2 | 0 | 0 | 0 | – | | 5 | 0 | 7 | 0 |
| 2014–15 | Rijeka | Prva HNL | 8 | 0 | 3 | 0 | 1 | 0 | 5 | 0 | 17 | 0 |
| 2015–16 | Rijeka | Prva HNL | 2 | 0 | 2 | 0 | – | | 10 | 0 | 14 | 0 |
| 2016–17 | Rijeka | Prva HNL | 36 | 0 | 4 | 0 | 2 | 0 | 14 | 0 | 56 | 0 |
| 2017–18 | Rijeka | Prva HNL | 9 | 0 | 1 | 0 | 4 | 0 | 8 | 0 | 22 | 0 |
| 2018–19 | Rijeka | Prva HNL | 1 | 0 | 1 | 0 | – | | 10 | 0 | 12 | 0 |
| 2019–20 | Rijeka | Prva HNL | 18 | 0 | 1 | 0 | 4 | 0 | 4 | 0 | 27 | 0 |
| 2020–21 | Rijeka | Prva HNL | 1 | 0 | 0 | 0 | 0 | 0 | 0 | 0 | 1 | 0 |
| 2021–22 | Rijeka | Prva HNL | 4 | 0 | 0 | 0 | 3 | 0 | 6 | 0 | 13 | 0 |
| Rijeka total | | | 81 | 0 | 12 | 0 | 14 | 0 | 74 | 0 | 181 | 0 |
| Career total | | | 194 | 0 | 23 | 0 | 14 | 0 | 102 | 0 | 333 | 0 |
Last Update: 8 October 2021.

^{1}Played in Croatian Cup and Croatian Super Cup with HNK Rijeka, Rudar Labin, Pomorac and Istra 1961.
^{2}Played in UEFA Champions League and UEFA Europa League with HNK Rijeka.
^{3}Includes friendly matches with Istra 1961 and HNK Rijeka.

=== International appearances ===
Croatia national team
| Year | Apps | Goals |
|---|---|---|
| 2017 | 1 | 0 |

== Honours ==
Rijeka

- Prva HNL: 2016–17
- Croatian Cup: 2006, 2014, 2017, 2019, 2020
- Croatian Super Cup: 2014

Performance

- Most clean sheets in Prva HNL: 2016–17 season
- Best goalkeeper in Prva HNL: 2016–17 season
- HNK Rijeka goalkeeper of the decade (2010–2020)

== External sources ==
- Andrej Prskalo at the Croatian Football Federation
- Andrej Prskalo at Soccerway
- Andrej Prskalo at Croatian Football Statistics (archived) (in Croatian)
- Andrej Prskalo at nk-rijeka.hr (in Croatian)
- Andrej Prskalo at National-Football-Teams.com
