= Stanovi =

Stanovi may refer to:

- Stanovi (Brčko), a village in Bosnia and Herzegovina
- Stanovi (Doboj), a village in Bosnia and Herzegovina
- Stanovi, Zadar, a part of the city of Zadar, Croatia
- Stadion Stanovi, a football stadium in Zadar, Croatia
