= Zedi =

Zedi may refer to:

- Burmese-language word for a stupa
- Zedi (name)
