= Anas Sharbini =

Croatian footballer (born 1987)

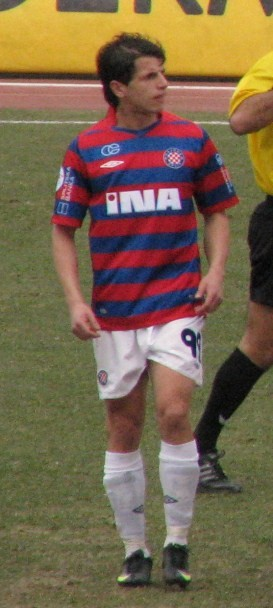
- Sharbini with Hajduk Split in 2010

Personal information
- Date of birth: 21 February 1987 (age 39)
- Place of birth: Rijeka, SR Croatia, Yugoslavia
- Height: 1.80 m (5 ft 11 in)
- Positions: Attacking midfielder; winger

Team information
- Current team: NK Rječina Dražice

Youth career
- 99: Rječina
- 1998–2005: Rijeka

Senior career*
Years	Team	Apps	(Gls)
2005–2009	Rijeka	72	(28)
2009–2012	Hajduk Split	63	(15)
2012–2013	Al-Ittihad	15	(0)
2013–2018	Rijeka	65	(11)
2016	→ Osmanlıspor (loan)	0	(0)
2018–2019	Grobničan	0	(0)
2021–	OSK Omišalj	40	(19)

International career^{‡}
2002–2003	Croatia U16	6	(0)
2003	Croatia U17	7	(4)
2004	Croatia U18	4	(0)
2005–2006	Croatia U19	11	(6)
2006	Croatia U21	1	(0)
2009–2015	Croatia	3	(2)
- * Club domestic league appearances and goals as of 2023-9-14 ‡ National team caps and goals as of 2023-9-14

Anas Sharbini (Arabic: أنس الشربيني; born 21 February 1987) is a Croatian professional footballer, currently playing for NK Rječina Dražice. He played as an attacking midfielder or winger, and was best known for his dribbling and crossing skills.

== Club career ==
=== Rijeka ===
Born in Rijeka, Sharbini rose through the ranks of his home-town club HNK Rijeka, starting his professional career with the club in 2005. Despite his young age, he was chosen to captain the side in the 2007–08 season. At Rijeka, he gained a reputation as one of the league's best dribblers and was famous for often scoring late equalizers. He was also selected by IMScouting as a "Player to Watch". Sharbini was Rijeka's top scorer with 14 goals in 2008–09 and second top scorer with 11 goals in 2007–08. Overall, prior to his transfer, he scored 28 goals in 72 league appearances for Rijeka.

=== Hajduk Split ===
On 13 August 2009 he signed for Hajduk Split in a deal which included bringing his brother Ahmad Sharbini to the Dalmatian club. The talented youngster had some troubles adjusting to his new environment and due to the club's struggles in finding and then keeping a coach for a longer term, he often found himself on and off the starting XI. He struggled to score as freely as he did at Rijeka but in between his consistent runs, he also put in some top notch performances carrying his struggling club on their way to consecutive second-place finishes in the Prva HNL in 2009–10 and 2010–11.

Sharbini reignited himself as a player in the 2011–12 season under coach Krasimir Balakov, who employed him as a left winger. After receiving heavy criticism for underperforming for some time, he scored a brace against NK Istra 1961 in a 3–0 win for Hajduk.

=== Ittihad ===
In July 2012, Sharbini was transferred to Ittihad for a sum of €1.8 million and signed a two-year contract.

=== Return to Rijeka ===
On 23 May 2013, Sharbini returned to Rijeka. He signed a two-year contract with an option for an additional year. On 29 July 2015, Sharbini signed a new three-year contract with Rijeka, extending his stay at the club until June 2018. In November 2015, after finding out he would be on the substitute's bench, Rijeka's captain Sharbini refused to travel with his teammates to Rijeka's league match against NK Osijek. He was fined €10,000 for the incident and stripped of the club's captaincy.

On 2 February 2016, Sharbini was loaned to Osmanlıspor, who play in the Turkish Süper Lig, until June 2016. He did not make any appearances during his time with Osmanlıspor due to injury. After his loan to Osmanlıspor ended, Sharbini had two years of his Rijeka contract remaining. In an unusual situation, Sharbini was not wanted back at Rijeka by both the club and coach Kek, but refused to sign for another club. According to some sources Sharbini was Rijeka's second highest paid player in 2017, despite not having played a single game.

=== Grobničan ===
On 3 July 2018 Sharbini signed for fourth tier club Grobničan. Even though he played a friendly match against Opatija during pre-season he did not play in any official matches for the club even though he was signed as a played and did not have any injuries.

=== OSK Omišalj ===
At the start of 2021, Sharbini returned to football, rejoining his brother Ahmad at OSK Omišalj.

== International career ==
Sharbini won 29 caps and scored 10 goals in various youth levels of Croatia and made his biggest impact with the Croatian U19 team. Due to his fine form in the 2007–08 season, national manager Slaven Bilić called him up to represent Croatia in their Euro 2008 campaign as a reserve in case of injuries, and most recently, for the 2010 FIFA World Cup qualifier against England in September 2009. Finally, he made his first appearance in the match against Qatar on 8 October 2009, which Croatia won 3–2. He scored his first international goal in his second cap five years later, opening a 1–2 defeat in a friendly match against Argentina in London on 12 November 2014.

== Achievements ==
Brothers Anas and Ahmad Sharbini are the only siblings to have each scored a hat-trick in the same match in top-tier European football leagues. In the first round fixture of the 2009–10 Croatian First Football League season against NK Lokomotiva, the brothers took turns. Ahmad opened the scoring after four minutes, Anas doubled the lead in the 27th minute and Ahmad made it 3–0 in the 35th minute. In the second half Anas converted a penalty in 51st minute, Ahmad completed his hat-trick in the 68th minute and two minutes later Anas scored his third goal.

Anas Sharbini holds the Croatian First Football League record in the number of assists since 2007–08, the first season for which assist data was collected. In 184 appearances for Rijeka and Hajduk Split, Sharbini set up 67 goals.

With 39 goals to his account, Sharbini is Rijeka's third top scorer in the Croatian First League.

== Career statistics ==
=== Club ===
As of 13 December 2015

Appearances and goals by club, season and competition
Club	Season	League		Cup and Supercup		Continental		Total	
Club	Season	Apps	Goals	Apps	Goals	Apps	Goals	Apps	Goals
Rijeka	2005–06	8	0	1	0	–		9	0
Rijeka	2006–07	8	0	1	0	–		9	0
Rijeka	2007–08	28	11	2	1	–		30	12
Rijeka	2008–09	27	14	4	3	1	0	32	17
Rijeka	2009–10	1	3	–		3	1	4	4
Rijeka	Total	72	28	8	4	4	1	84	33
Hajduk Split	2009–10	21	3	4	0	–		25	3
Hajduk Split	2010–11	20	5	2	0	9	0	31	5
Hajduk Split	2011–12	22	7	3	0	2	0	27	7
Hajduk Split	Total	63	15	9	0	11	0	83	15
Ittihad	2012–13	15	0	1	0	4	0	20	0
Rijeka	2013–14	24	4	6	0	8	1	38	5
Rijeka	2014–15	29	4	5	1	9	0	43	5
Rijeka	2015–16	12	3	1	0	1	0	14	3
Rijeka	Total	65	11	12	1	18	1	95	13
Career total		215	54	30	5	37	2	282	61

=== International ===
Appearances and goals by national team and year
National team	Year	Apps	Goals
Croatia	2009	1	0
Croatia	2014	1	1
Croatia	2015	1	1
Total		3	2

Scores and results list Croatia's goal tally first, score column indicates score after each Sharbini goal.

List of international goals scored by Anas Sharbini
No.	Date	Venue	Opponent	Score	Result	Competition
1	12 November 2014	Boleyn Ground, London, England	Argentina		1–2	Friendly
2	7 June 2015	Stadion Varteks, Varaždin, Croatia	Gibraltar		4–0	Friendly

== Personal life ==
Sharbini's older brother, Ahmad Sharbini, was also a professional footballer who played with Rijeka. Sharbini is of Albanian, Palestinian and Croatian descent. He was born in Rijeka, to a local Albanian Croatian mother and Palestinian father, Jamal Al-Sharbini, from Damascus, Syria.

== Honours ==
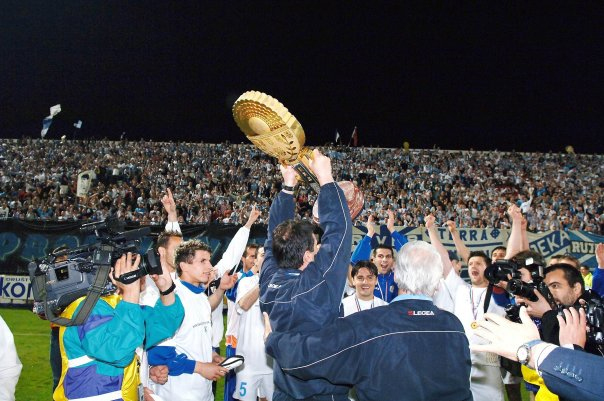
Sharbini with teammates winning the 2006 Croatian Cup with Rijeka

Rijeka

- Croatian Football Cup (2): 2005–06, 2013–14
- Croatian Football Super Cup (1): 2014

Hajduk Split

- Croatian Football Cup (1): 2009–10

Individual

- Sportske novosti Yellow Shirt award (1): 2011–12
- Most assists in the Croatian First Football League: 2010–11
