= Radomir Đalović =

Montenegrin footballer

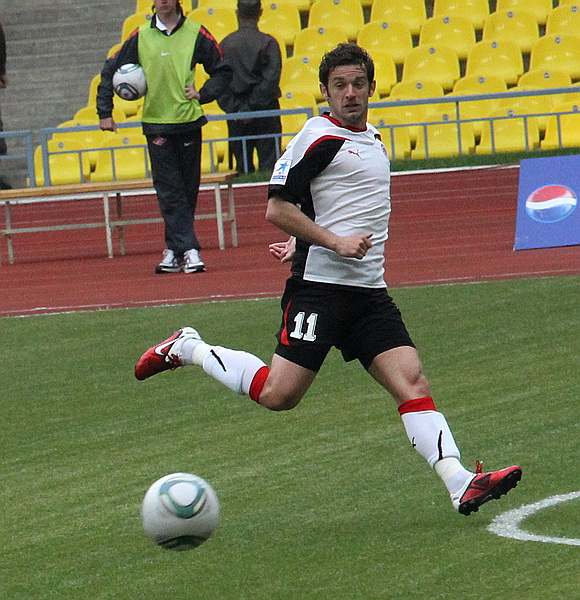
- Đalović with Amkar in 2011

Personal information
- Date of birth: 29 October 1982 (age 43)
- Place of birth: Bijelo Polje, SR Montenegro, Yugoslavia
- Height: 1.86 m (6 ft 1 in)
- Position: Forward

Senior career*
Years	Team	Apps	(Gls)
1999–2000	Jedinstvo Bijelo Polje	9	(3)
2000–2001	Red Star Belgrade	14	(2)
2001–2002	Železnik	24	(12)
2002–2006	Zagreb	72	(50)
2005–2006	→ Arminia Bielefeld (loan)	29	(7)
2006–2007	Kayseri Erciyesspor	31	(19)
2007–2008	Rijeka	23	(21)
2008–2010	Rapid București	44	(29)
2009–2010	→ Rijeka (loan)	16	(10)
2010–2011	Rijeka	29	(15)
2011–2012	Amkar Perm	26	(18)
2012–2014	Sepahan	51	(26)
2014	Shanghai Shenxin	3	(0)
2014	BEC-Tero Sasana	14	(4)
2015	Bangkok	33	(28)
2016–2017	Budućnost Podgorica	10	(4)
2017–2019	Rudar Pljevlja	59	(23)
2019	OFK Titograd	16	(2)
2020	Grbalj	11	(1)
Total		514	(274)

International career
2003–2004	Serbia and Montenegro U21	6	(1)
2007–2011	Montenegro	26	(7)

Managerial career
- 2024–2025: Rijeka
- 2025: Maribor
- 2025–2026: Kayserispor
Medal record
Representing Serbia and Montenegro
UEFA Under-21 Championship
Silver medal – second place	2004
- * Club domestic league appearances and goals

Radomir Đalović (Montenegrin: Радомир Ђаловић; born 29 October 1982) is a Montenegrin professional football coach and a former player. He last managed Süper Lig club Kayserispor. In international competitions, he has played 26 matches for the national team of Montenegro.

== Club career ==
=== Early career ===
Born in Bijelo Polje, Đalović began his football career in his hometown club FK Jedinstvo Bijelo Polje. He was soon noticed by scouts of Red Star Belgrade, who had just sold Perica Ognjenović to Real Madrid. Đalović, being a powerful and very athletic player, impressed the Belgrade side and signed for them, but later failed to make a lasting impression at the club. After only half a season, he was transferred to FK Železnik. Later, he played for the Turkish side Kayseri Erciyesspor, and had successful spells with Zagreb and Rijeka. He was known for his speed, agility, and athletic finesse, as well as impressive bicycle kicks.

=== Rapid Bucharest ===
In the summer of 2008, Đalović joined Romanian side Rapid București, after the club had paid Rijeka a transfer fee of €700,000. After one season with the club, Rapid Bucharest loaned him back to Rijeka for a season, and in the summer of 2010, after Rijeka had paid Rapid Bucharest a transfer fee of €50,000, he was officially a Rijeka player once again.

=== Amkar Perm ===
In March 2012, Đalović completed another transfer, this time to Amkar Perm, after the club had paid Rijeka a transfer fee of €450,000.

=== Sepahan ===
Soon after, in the summer of 2012, Đalović joined Iranian side Sepahan, after the club had paid Amkar Perm a transfer fee of €600,000. Sepahan was coached by Zlatko Kranjčar who had previously coached Đalović at Zagreb between 2002 and 2004. Although Đalović impressed during the 2013 AFC Champions League group stage by scoring against Al Nasr SC (Dubai) and Al-Ahli (Jeddah), Sepahan did not qualify for the knock out stages.

=== Shanghai Shenxin ===
In February 2014, Đalović completed a transfer to Chinese Super League side Shanghai Shenxin for an undisclosed amount.

=== OFK Titograd ===
In June 2019, Đalović signed for OFK Titograd on a free transfer.

== International career ==
He made his debut for Montenegro in an October 2007 friendly match against Estonia and has earned a total of 26 caps (22 official), scoring 7 goals, which places him sixth on Montenegro's all-time top scorer list. His final international was a November 2011 European Championship qualification match against the Czech Republic. He retired on 18 February 2012 for personal reasons.

== Career statistics ==
As of 17 March 2018

Appearances and goals by club, season and competition
Club	Season	League			National cup		Continental		Total	
Club	Season	Division	Apps	Goals	Apps	Goals	Apps	Goals	Apps	Goals
Jedinstvo Bijelo Polje	1999–2000	Second League of FR Yugoslavia	9	3			—		9	3
Red Star Belgrade	2000–01	First League of FR Yugoslavia	14	2			0	0	14	2
Železnik	2001–02	First League of FR Yugoslavia	24	4			—		24	4
NK Zagreb	2002–03	Prva HNL	25	8	3	0	1	0	29	8
NK Zagreb	2003–04	Prva HNL	29	9	2	0	2	1	33	10
NK Zagreb	2004–05	Prva HNL	18	7	1	1	—		19	8
Arminia Bielefeld	2004–05	Bundesliga	8	1			—		8	1
Arminia Bielefeld	2005–06	Bundesliga	21	2	4	1	—		25	3
Kayseri Erciyesspor	2006–07	Süper Lig	27	2			—		27	2
Rijeka	2007–08	Prva HNL	31	18	2	1	—		33	19
Rijeka	2008–09	Prva HNL	0	0	0	0	2	0	2	0
Rapid București	2008–09	Liga I	22	2	2	0	1	0	25	2
Rapid București	2009–10	Liga I	2	0			—		2	0
Rijeka	2009–10	Prva HNL	21	10	2	1	0	0	23	11
Rijeka	2010–11	Prva HNL	20	5	3	2	—		23	7
Amkar Perm	2011–12	Russian Premier League	27	0	1	0	—		28	0
Sepahan	2012–13	Iran Pro League	26	4	2	0	5	2	33	6
Sepahan	2013–14	Iran Pro League	13	2	1	0	0	0	11	2
Shanghai Shenxin	2014	Chinese Super League	3	0	0	0	—		3	0
BEC-Tero Sasana	2014	Thai Premier League	14	2	0	0	—		14	2
Bangkok	2015	Thai Division 1 League	33	15	0	0	—		33	15
Budućnost Podgorica	2015–16	Montenegrin First League	15	6	0	0	0	0	15	6
Budućnost Podgorica	2016–17	Montenegrin First League	32	11	0	0	4	1	36	12
Career total										

== Honours ==
=== Player ===
Red Star Belgrade

- First League of FR Yugoslavia: 2000–01

Sepahan

- Hazfi Cup: 2012–13

Budućnost Podgorica

- Montenegrin First League: 2016–17

=== Manager ===
Rijeka

- Croatian Football League: 2024–25
- Croatian Football Cup: 2024–25
