= Davor Landeka =

Croatian football player (born 1984)

Personal information
- Full name: Davor Landeka
- Date of birth: 18 September 1984 (age 42)
- Place of birth: Posušje, SR Bosnia and Herzegovina, Yugoslavia
- Height: 1.79 m (5 ft 10 in)
- Position: Central midfielder

Team information
- Current team: Posušje
- Number: 13

Youth career
- Posušje
- 2000–2003: Dinamo Zagreb

Senior career*
Years	Team	Apps	(Gls)
2003–2008	Zrinjski Mostar	127	(2)
2008–2011	Rijeka	81	(0)
2011–2012	Grasshopper	8	(0)
2012–2016	Široki Brijeg	77	(0)
2016–2017	Imotski	31	(0)
2017–	Posušje	76	(1)

International career
2004–2005	Bosnia Herzegovina U21	10	(0)
- * Club domestic league appearances and goals as of 1 May 2023

Davor Landeka (born 18 September 1984) is a BH professional footballer who plays as a midfielder for BH Premier League club Posušje.

While playing in Zrinjski, he won two titles, the national championship and the national cup. He played for the Bosnia-Herzegovina Under 21 team.

== Honours ==
=== Zrinjski Mostar ===
- Premier League of Bosnia and Herzegovina: 2004–05
- Bosnia and Herzegovina Football Cup: 2008

=== Široki Brijeg ===
- Bosnia and Herzegovina Football Cup: 2013

== Career statistics ==
Season	Club	League	League		Cup		Europe		Total	
Season	Club	League	Apps	Goals	Apps	Goals	Apps	Goals	Apps	Goals
2003–04	Zrinjski Mostar	Premier League	26	1	1	0	–		27	0
2004–05	Zrinjski Mostar	Premier League	20	1	4	0	–		24	1
2005–06	Zrinjski Mostar	Premier League	28	0	2	0	3	0	33	0
2006–07	Zrinjski Mostar	Premier League	28	0	1	0	2	0	31	0
2007–08	Zrinjski Mostar	Premier League	25	0	9	1	4	0	35	1
Zrinjski Mostar total			127	2	17	1	9	0	153	3
2008–09	Rijeka	1. HNL	27	0	3	0	0	0	30	0
2009–10	Rijeka	1. HNL	25	0	2	0	3	0	30	0
2010–11	Rijeka	1. HNL	28	0	3	0	–		30	0
Rijeka total			81	0	8	0	3	0	92	0
2011–12	Grasshopper	Super League	8	0	0	0	–		8	0
2011–12	Grasshopper U-21	1. Liga	5	0	–		–		5	0
2011–12	Grasshopper total		13	0	0	0	0	0	13	0
2012–13	Široki Brijeg	Premier League	12	0	3	0	–		8	0
2013–14	Široki Brijeg	Premier League	27	0	0	0	4	0	31	0
2014–15	Široki Brijeg	Premier League	24	0	5	0	4	0	33	0
2015–16	Široki Brijeg	Premier League	14	0	2	0	–		16	0
Široki Brijeg total			77	0	10	0	8	0	95	0
2016–17	Imotski	2. HNL	31	0	–		–		31	0
Imotski total			31	0	0	0	0	0	31	0
Career total			329	2	35	1	20	0	384	3
Stats, Rijeka stats
