= Zedi (name) =

Zedi is both a given name and a surname. Notable people with the surname include:

- Zedi Feruzi (died 2015), Burundian politician
- Zedi Ramadani (born 1985), Croatian footballer
- Rudolf Zedi (born 1974), German footballer
- Selemani Zedi (born 1965), Tanzanian politician
