= Stanovi (Doboj) =

Stanovi Станови
- Village
- Location within Bosnia and Herzegovina
- Coordinates: 44°44′34″N 17°59′16″E
- Country: Bosnia and Herzegovina
- Entity: Republika Srpska
- Municipality: Doboj
- Time zone: UTC+1 (CET)
  - Summer (DST): UTC+2 (CEST)

Stanovi (Cyrillic: Станови) is a village in the municipality of Doboj, Republika Srpska, Bosnia and Herzegovina.
