= Jan Doležal (footballer) =

Croatian footballer

Personal information
- Date of birth: 12 February 1993 (age 33)
- Place of birth: Zagreb, Croatia
- Height: 1.82 m (6 ft 0 in)
- Position: Forward

Team information
- Current team: Rudeš

Youth career
- 2003–2006: Dinamo Zagreb
- 2006–2011: Hrvatski Dragovoljac

Senior career*
Years	Team	Apps	(Gls)
2011–2014	Hrvatski Dragovoljac	45	(8)
2014–2018	Lokomotiva	79	(12)
2018–2019	Slaven Belupo	32	(1)
2019	Hrvatski Dragovoljac	10	(1)
2020	Horn	10	(0)
2020–2022	Ethnikos Achna	47	(4)
2022–2023	Rudeš	9	(3)
2023	Pegia	10	(1)
2023–2024	Enosis Neon Paralimni	12	(1)
2024–	Rudeš	12	(1)

International career^{‡}
2011	Croatia U19	1	(0)
2012	Croatia U20	2	(0)
- * Club domestic league appearances and goals as of 26 May 2024 ‡ National team caps and goals as of 20 December 2012

Jan Doležal (born 12 February 1993) is a Croatian professional footballer who plays for Rudeš as a forward.

== Club career ==
Doležal spent his youth years with GNK Dinamo Zagreb Academy, and from 2006 with NK Hrvatski Dragovoljac, where he made his professional debut in 2011. Following three seasons with the club, in 2014 he moved to NK Lokomotiva. In January 2018 Doležal was signed by NK Slaven Belupo on a two-year deal. He had a 6-month spell with Austrian second tier-outfit SV Horn in 2020.

== International career ==
Doležal was capped for Croatian U19 and U20 sides.
