= Zedi Ramadani =

Croatian footballer (born 1985)

Personal information
- Full name: Zedi Ramadani
- Date of birth: 22 April 1985 (age 41)
- Place of birth: Pula, SR Croatia, SFR Yugoslavia
- Height: 1.85 m (6 ft 1 in)
- Position: Midfielder

Youth career
- 1999–2003: Uljanik Pula
- 2004: Varteks

Senior career*
Years	Team	Apps	(Gls)
2003	Uljanik Pula		
2004–2005	Varteks	24	(1)
2005–2007	Pula	36	(3)
2007–2008	HNK Rijeka	3	(0)
2008–2009	Croati Sesvete	2	(0)
2009–2010	Vrsar	20	(0)
2010–2011	Medulin 1921	9	(0)
2011–2012	Segesta	21	(6)
2015	Kurilovec	6	(0)

International career
2000–2004	Croatia U19	21	(3)
2004–2006	Croatia U21	22	(1)
- * Club domestic league appearances and goals as of May 9, 2020

Zedi Ramadani (born 22 April 1985) is a Croatian retired football player of Albanian descent.

== Career ==
Ramadani previously played for NK Varteks, NK Pula, HNK Rijeka and NK Croatia Sesvete of the Croatian Prva HNL. A former u-21 national football team player, his professional career was crippled by a mysterious illness which turned out to be a brain tumor, which was operated on in May 2009. Recovering from the disease, he returned to playing lower league football, hoping to play in the Prva HNL again one day.

== Personal life ==
He has ethnic Albanian ancestry from North Macedonia, namely Tetovo.
