= Tarik Cerić =

Bosnian-Herzegovinian footballer

Personal information
- Date of birth: 28 January 1978 (age 48)
- Place of birth: Sarajevo, SFR Yugoslavia
- Height: 1.93 m (6 ft 4 in)
- Position: Defender

Youth career
- –2002: Olimpik Sarajevo

Senior career*
Years	Team	Apps	(Gls)
2002	SAŠK Napredak		
2003–2004	Sarajevo	2	(0)
2004–2006	Posušje	42	(4)
2006–2008	ŁKS Łódź	25	(0)
2008–2010	Rijeka	28	(5)
2010–2011	Šibenik	7	(0)
2011–2012	Velež Mostar	14	(0)
- * Club domestic league appearances and goals

Tarik Cerić (born 28 January 1978) is a Bosnian former professional footballer who played as a defender.
