= Antonini Čulina =

Croatian footballer

Personal information
- Full name: Antonini Čulina
- Date of birth: 27 January 1992 (age 34)
- Place of birth: Zadar, Croatia
- Height: 1.84 m (6 ft 1/2 in)
- Position: Midfielder

Team information
- Current team: Rijeka (assistant sporting director)

Youth career
- 2003: Zadar
- 2004–2005: Hajduk Pridraga
- 2005–2008: Dalmatinac Crno
- 2008–2011: Rijeka

Senior career*
Years	Team	Apps	(Gls)
2009–2015	Rijeka	71	(9)
2013–2015	→ Spezia (loan)	17	(1)
2015	→ Varese (loan)	10	(1)
2015–2017	Lugano	33	(10)
2018	Cracovia	16	(0)
2019	Inter Zaprešić	12	(0)
2019–2020	Viterbese	13	(0)
2020	Padova	4	(0)
2020–2021	Hapoel Afula	18	(3)

International career
2008–2009	Croatia U17	5	(0)
2010–2011	Croatia U19	9	(2)
2012–2013	Croatia U20	4	(2)
2012–2013	Croatia U21	4	(0)
- * Club domestic league appearances and goals as of 2 July 2021 (UTC)

Antonini Čulina (born 27 January 1992) is a Croatian former football player who last played as a midfielder for Hapoel Afula in Israel, as of July 2021 working as HNK Rijeka's assistant sporting director.

== Club career ==
Čulina has spent the first three years of his career with HNK Rijeka, scoring 9 goals and becoming a regular starter. In July 2013, Rijeka loaned Čulina to Spezia in Italy's Serie B. Following two seasons on loan with Spezia and Varese, in mid-2015 Čulina signed for Lugano.

On 13 September 2019, he returned to Italy, signing with Serie C club Viterbese.

On 31 January 2020, he signed a contract with Padova until the end of the season, with the club holding an option to extend it for the 2020–21 season.

On 7 December 2020 signed in Hapoel Afula.

On 2 July 2021 HNK Rijeka announced Čulina's retirement from professional football and that he would join the club as assistant to their sporting director, Robert Palikuća.

== International ==
He has also been capped for Croatia's Under-19 and Under-21 side.
