= Matija Matko =

Croatian footballer

Personal information
- Date of birth: 20 September 1982 (age 44)
- Place of birth: Zagreb, SR Croatia, Yugoslavia
- Height: 1.82 m (6 ft 0 in)
- Position: Forward

Youth career
- Dinamo Zagreb

Senior career*
Years	Team	Apps	(Gls)
2001–2003	Hrvatski Dragovoljac	23	(3)
2003–2004	Čelik Zenica	23	(9)
2004–2005	CSKA Sofia	6	(0)
2005–2006	FK Sarajevo	14	(6)
2006–2008	Zrinjski	48	(18)
2008–2010	Rijeka	30	(3)
2010–2011	Inter Zaprešić	10	(1)
2011	Zvijezda	5	(1)
2012	FK Sarajevo	18	(2)
2012	Inter Zaprešić	13	(0)
2013	Gorica	9	(1)
2013-2019	Zagorec		
- * Club domestic league appearances and goals

Matija Matko (born 20 September 1982) is a Croatian footballer who plays as a forward.

== Club career ==
In August 2008, Matko came to HNK Rijeka from HŠK Zrinjski Mostar, where he was one of the best players in the club. In 2010 Matko joined NK Inter Zaprešić.
