= Valentino Stepčić =

Croatian footballer (born 1990)

Personal information
- Full name: Valentino Stepčić
- Date of birth: 16 January 1990 (age 36)
- Place of birth: Pula, Croatia
- Height: 1.88 m (6 ft 2 in)
- Positions: Midfielder; winger

Team information
- Current team: Rudar Labin

Youth career
- 2000–2007: Rudar Labin
- 2008: Istra 1961
- 2008–2009: Rijeka

Senior career*
Years	Team	Apps	(Gls)
2009–2012	Rijeka	42	(1)
2009	→ Rudar Labin (loan)	15	(1)
2012	Rudar Labin	14	(4)
2013	Bela Krajina	12	(0)
2013–2016	Zagreb	97	(13)
2016–2017	Istra 1961	21	(3)
2017	Cibalia	7	(0)
2018	Anagennisi Deryneia	12	(1)
2018–2019	Stuttgarter Kickers	21	(3)
2019–2020	Calcio Leinfelden-Echterdingen	17	(3)
2021-	Rudar Labin		
- * Club domestic league appearances and goals as of 28 December 2022

Valentino Stepčić (born 16 January 1990) is a Croatian footballer who plays for Rudar Labin as a midfielder.

== Club career ==
Born in Pula, but originally from Labin, Stepčić spent most of his youth years at the local NK Rudar Labin. Signing for the nearby Prva HNL team HNK Rijeka, he made his first-team debut in a 3–0 away loss against NK Inter Zaprešić on 31 May 2009, coming in the 70th minute for Matija Matko. After leaving Rijeka in 2012, he spent the 2012–13 season in lower-tier teams, first back at Rudar, then at NK Bela Krajina, before signing for NK Zagreb, then in Druga HNL, achieving promotion to Prva HNL immediately at the end of the 2013–14 season. He joined German side Stuttgarter Kickers in 2018 .
