= Hrvoje Štrok =

Croatian footballer

Personal information
- Full name: Hrvoje Štrok
- Date of birth: 14 July 1980 (age 46)
- Place of birth: Zagreb, SR Croatia, Yugoslavia
- Height: 1.75 m (5 ft 9 in)
- Position: Midfielder

Senior career*
Years	Team	Apps	(Gls)
2000–2003	NK Zagreb	69	(13)
2003–2005	Dinamo Zagreb	47	(4)
2005–2006	Inter Zaprešić	15	(3)
2006–2011	Rijeka	123	(15)
2011–2013	NK Zagreb	54	(5)
2013–2015	NK Sesvete	59	(7)
2015–2016	Gorica	18	(1)
2016–2017	Hrvatski Dragovoljac	26	(4)
2017–2018	NK Savski Marof		
2018	NK Dinamo Odranski Obrež		
2018–2019	NK Rakov Potok	13	(2)
2019–2020	NK Oroslavje		
- * Club domestic league appearances and goals

Hrvoje Štrok (born 14 July 1980) is a Croatian retired football midfielder and current coach.

== Club career ==
Štrok previously played for HNK Gorica, NK Sesvete, NK Zagreb, GNK Dinamo Zagreb, NK Inter Zaprešić and HNK Rijeka.

== Career statistics ==
Club performance			League		Cup		League Cup		Continental		Total	
Season	Club	League	Caps	Goals	Caps	Goals	Caps	Goals	Caps	Goals	Caps	Goals
Croatia			League		Croatian Cup		Super Cup		Europe		Total	
2000–01	NK Zagreb	Prva HNL	21	3	4	0	–	–	-	-	23	0
2001–02	NK Zagreb	Prva HNL	22	3	0	0	–	–	-	-	26	3
2002–03	NK Zagreb	Prva HNL	24	7	3	0	1	0	1	0	29	7
2003–04	GNK Dinamo Zagreb	Prva HNL	25	2	3	0	–	–	7	0	35	2
2004–05	GNK Dinamo Zagreb	Prva HNL	22	2	3	0	1	0	3	0	92	2
2005–06	NK Inter Zaprešić	Prva HNL	15	3	1	0	–	–	0	0	16	3
2006–07	HNK Rijeka	Prva HNL	6	1	2	0	–	–	-	-	30	4
2007–08	HNK Rijeka	Prva HNL	27	3	2	0	–	–	0	0	29	3
2008–09	HNK Rijeka	Prva HNL	31	2	4	0	–	–	2	0	37	2
2009–10	HNK Rijeka	Prva HNL	29	4	1	0	–	–	4	0	34	3
2010–11	HNK Rijeka	Prva HNL	29	6	3	4	–	–	-	-	32	10
2011–12	NK Zagreb	Prva HNL	27	4	4	0	–	–	-	-	31	4
2012–13	NK Zagreb	Prva HNL	27	1	2	1	–	–	-	-	29	2
2013–14	NK Sesvete	Druga HNL	31	4	-	-	–	–	-	-	31	4
2014–15	NK Sesvete	Druga HNL	28	3	-	-	–	–	-	-	28	3
2015–16	HNK Gorica	Druga HNL	17	1	1	0	–	–	-	-	18	1
2015–16	NK Hrvatski Dragovoljac	Druga HNL	9	1	-	-	–	–	-	-	9	1
2016–17	NK Hrvatski Dragovoljac	Druga HNL	17	3	-	-	–	–	-	-	17	3
League	Prva HNL		305	41	32	5	2	0	17	0	59	46
League	Druga HNL		102	12	1	0	0	0	0	0	103	12
Total			407	53	33	4	2	0	17	0	459	57

== Honours ==
Zagreb

- Prva HNL (1): 2001–02

Dinamo Zagreb

- Croatian Cup (1): 2004

Individual

- HNK Rijeka top goalscorer - 2010–11
