= Vedran Turkalj =

Croatian football defender (born 1988)

Personal information
- Full name: Vedran Turkalj
- Date of birth: 11 May 1988 (age 38)
- Place of birth: Rijeka, SFR Yugoslavia
- Height: 1.93 m (6 ft 4 in)
- Position: Centre back

Youth career
- –2007: Rijeka

Senior career*
Years	Team	Apps	(Gls)
2006–2010	Rijeka	35	(2)
2010–2013	Pomorac	71	(5)
2014	Solin	13	(1)
2014	Zrinjski Mostar	0	(0)
2015	Bistra	7	(0)
2015–2017	Aluminij	56	(2)
2017	KA Akureyri	10	(1)
2018	Stadl-Paura	11	(2)

International career
2005	Croatia U17	1	(1)
2005	Croatia U18	3	(0)
2006–2007	Croatia U19	8	(2)
2008	Croatia U20	1	(0)
- * Club domestic league appearances and goals as of 1 June 2017

Vedran Turkalj (born 11 May 1988) is a Croatian football defender.

== Career ==
Vedran Turkalj went through the ranks of Rijeka, becoming a Croatian youth international in 2005. He made his first team debut in the 2–0 home win against Pula In the end, he collected 8 appearances in the 2006–07 season, when he was still eligible to play for the U19 team. His progress was, however, marred by an injury leading to a foot operation, which caused him to miss most of the 2007–08 season. He spent two further seasons at the club, unable to fully break in the first team for similar reasons.

In the summer of 2010 he moved to the nearby Druga HNL team Pomorac Kostrena, becoming a firm first team fixture and helping the team to secure a third-place finish in the 2010–11 season and a second-place finish in the 2011–12 season. In the following seasons he became team captain as well, before moving to Solin in January 2014.

He had a spell with KA Akureyri in 2017 and in Austria in 2018.
