= Velimir Radman =

Croatian football goalkeeper (born 1983)

Personal information
- Date of birth: 28 May 1983 (age 43)
- Place of birth: Banja Luka, SFR Yugoslavia
- Height: 1.85 m (6 ft 1 in)
- Position: Goalkeeper

Senior career*
Years	Team	Apps	(Gls)
2002–2010	Rijeka	74	(0)
2002–2003	→ Opatija (loan)		
2010–2011	Panserraikos	22	(0)
2011–2013	Atromitos	23	(0)
2013–2018	Lošinj		

International career^{‡}
1999–2000	Croatia U16	2	(0)
2001	Croatia U19	1	(0)
2005	Croatia U21	2	(0)
- * Club domestic league appearances and goals as of 13:22, 14 June 2012 (UTC) ‡ National team caps and goals as of 13:22, 14 June 2012 (UTC)

Velimir Radman (born 28 May 1983 in Banja Luka) is a Croatian football goalkeeper, who last played for NK Lošinj, a club based in Lošinj which competes in 4th Croatian league.

== Club career ==
He played for NK Rijeka from 2002 to 2010, with a one-year loan spell to NK Opatija during the 2002–03 season. On 14 July 2010 he signed for Super League Greece side Panserraikos.

On 6 June 2011 and after his good performances with the Serres team during the previous season, he signed a two-year contract for Atromitos.

== International career ==
Radman has been capped twice for the Croatia national under-21 football team. He is also an ex-Croatia under-16 and under-19 international.

== Honours ==
Rijeka

- Croatian Cup: 2005, 2006
