= Denis Ljubović =

Croatian footballer

Personal information
- Date of birth: 20 March 1988 (age 38)
- Place of birth: Rijeka, SFR Yugoslavia
- Height: 1.85 m (6 ft 1 in)
- Position: Defender

Team information
- Current team: Øystese

Youth career
- Rijeka

Senior career*
Years	Team	Apps	(Gls)
2007–2008	Orijent	28	(1)
2008–2011	Rijeka	29	(1)
2011–2012	Karlovac	9	(0)
2012–2013	Zadar	12	(0)
2013-2014	Domžale	4	(0)
2014	Opatija	0	(0)
2014-2015	Fyllingsdalen	54	(2)
2016–2019	Lysekloster	85	(8)
2021	Øystese	10	(1)
2022	Halubjan		
2022–	Øystese	15	(3)
- * Club domestic league appearances and goals as of 10 October 2022

Denis Ljubović (born 20 March 1988) is a Croatian football defender who currently plays for Norwegian amateur side Øystese Fotball.

== Club career ==
He spent the first few years of his professional career with Rijeka in Croatia's Prva HNL and was with the club until 2011. The following two seasons he played with Karlovac and Zadar in Prva HNL, before moving to Domžale in Slovenia's Prva Liga. He had a short spell with Opatija in Croatian Third Division.
