= Fausto Budicin =

Croatian former professional footballer

Personal information
- Date of birth: 1 May 1981 (age 45)
- Place of birth: Pula, SR Croatia, SFR Yugoslavia
- Height: 1.86 m (6 ft 1 in)
- Position: Defender

Youth career
- 1990–1999: Rovinj

Senior career*
Years	Team	Apps	(Gls)
1999–2002	Istra		
2002–2005	Olimpija Ljubljana	70	(7)
2005	ASKÖ Pasching	11	(0)
2005–2011	Rijeka	137	(10)
2006–2007	→ Pula Staročeško (loan)	14	(1)
2011–2014	Istra 1961	75	(2)
2014–2016	Rijeka II	53	(1)

International career
2001	Croatia U20	2	(0)
2002	Croatia U21	2	(0)

Managerial career
- 2016–2019: Rijeka U15
- 2019–2020: Orijent 1919
- 2020–2021: Istra 1961
- 2022: Rijeka
- * Club domestic league appearances and goals

Fausto Budicin (born 1 May 1981) is a Croatian professional football manager and former player who was most recently manager of Croatian First Football League club Rijeka

== Managerial career ==
On 27 March 2019, Budicin was appointed new manager at Croatian Third Football League club Orijent 1919. His first success at Orijent bench came at the end of the season; Orijent gained promotion to the second-tier Druga HNL finishing third in the 2018–19 Treća HNL West season.

In the club's inaugural second league season, Budicin led the squad to finish in third at the league table in March 2020, when the championship was postponed due to the COVID-19 pandemic in Croatia. NK Croatia Zmijavci, which finished second in the league championship, did not ask for a license to play in the First League, so Orijent took their place in the relegation play-offs for a higher tier, in which Istra 1961 was more successful.

After Orijent failed to gain promotion to the first tier, Budicin was named head coach of Istra 1961 on 26 August 2020, succeeding Ivan Prelec, whose contract expired and was not renewed. However he has been sacked on 11 February 2021. Budicin was named manager of Rijeka in June 2022, only to be replaced by Serse Cosmi after two months.

== Career statistics ==
Club performance			League		Cup		League Cup		Continental		Total	
Season	Club	League	Apps	Goals	Apps	Goals	Apps	Goals	Apps	Goals	Apps	Goals
Croatia			League		Croatian Cup		Super Cup		Europe		Total	
1999–2000	Istra	Prva HNL	0	0	–		–		–		0	0
2000–01	Istra	Druga HNL - South	–		–		–		–		–	
2000–01	Istra	Druga HNL - South	–		–		–		–		–	
Slovenia			League		Slovenian Cup		Super Cup		Europe		Total	
2002–03	Olimpija Ljubljana	Slovenian PrvaLiga	23	1	6	0	–		–		29	1
2003–04	Olimpija Ljubljana	Slovenian PrvaLiga	31	5	1	0	–		2	0	32	5
2004–05	Olimpija Ljubljana	Slovenian PrvaLiga	16	1	2	0	–		–		18	1
Austria			League		ÖFB Cup		Super Cup		Europe		Total	
2004–05	ASKÖ Pasching	Austrian Bundesliga	11	0	1	0	–		–		12	0
Croatia			League		Croatian Cup		Super Cup		Europe		Total	
2005–06	Rijeka	Prva HNL	10	0	0	0	1	0	0	0	11	0
2006–07	Pula Staročeško	Prva HNL	14	1	0	0	–		–		11	0
2006–07	Rijeka	Prva HNL	13	2	2	0	–		–		15	2
2007–08	Rijeka	Prva HNL	32	1	2	0	–		–		33	1
2008–09	Rijeka	Prva HNL	25	3	4	0	–		2	0	31	3
2009–10	Rijeka	Prva HNL	27	2	2	0	–		4	0	32	2
2010–11	Rijeka	Prva HNL	30	2	4	0	–		–		34	2
2011–12	Istra 1961	Prva HNL	14	0	1	0	–		–		15	0
2012–13	Istra 1961	Prva HNL	30	1	1	0	–		–		31	1
2013–14	Istra 1961	Prva HNL	31	1	4	0	–		–		35	1
2014–15	Rijeka	Prva HNL	0	0	1	0	0	0	0	0	1	0
2014–15	Rijeka II	Treća HNL - West	27	1	–		–		–		27	1
2015–16	Rijeka II	Treća HNL - West	26	1	–		–		–		26	0
Total	Croatia		265	15	21	0	1	0	6	0	293	15
Total	Slovenia		70	7	9	0	0	0	2	0	81	7
Total	Austria		11	0	1	0	0	0	0	0	12	0
Total	Career total		346	22	31	0	1	0	8	0	386	22

== Managerial statistics ==
As of 5 September 2022

Managerial record by team and tenure
Team	From	To	Record							
Team	From	To	G	W	D	L	GF	GA	GD	Win %
Orijent 1919	27 March 2019	26 August 2020	22	10	7	5	27	26	+1	45.45
Istra 1961	26 August 2020	12 February 2021	18	4	4	10	1	2	−1	22.22
Rijeka	20 June 2022	5 September 2022	9	1	2	6	6	12	−6	11.11
Total			49	15	13	21	34	40	−6	30.61

== Honours ==
=== Player ===
Istra

- Druga HNL (South): 2001–02

Olimpija Ljubljana

- Slovenian Cup: 2002–03

Rijeka

- Croatian Cup: 2005–06

Individual

- Most appearances in Derby della Učka

=== Manager ===
Orijent 1919

- Treća HNL (West) third-place promotion: 2018–19
