= Stadion Stanovi =

Football stadium in Zadar, Croatia

Coordinates: 44°06′46″N 15°14′49″E

Stanovi
- Interactive map of Stanovi
- Full name: Stadion Stanovi
- Location: Zadar, Croatia
- Operator: HNK Zadar
- Capacity: 5,860
- Surface: Grass

Construction
- Opened: 1979
- Renovated: 1994, 2008

Tenants
- NK Zadar (1979–2020); HNK Zadar (2020–present)

Stadion Stanovi (English: Stanovi Stadium) is a football stadium in Zadar, Croatia. It serves as the home ground for football club HNK Zadar. The stadium has a capacity of 5,860.

In the current form, the stadium was completed for the 1979 Mediterranean Games held in Split. Due to new license conditions set by the Croatian Football Federation, the stadium was equipped with a floodlight system in 2008. On 29 March 2008, NK Zadar player Hrvoje Ćustić suffered severe head injuries after colliding with a concrete wall positioned about three metres from the sideline. His death in hospital a few days later prompted a renovation of the stadium, which included removing the controversial wall.
