= List of Croatian football transfers summer 2016 =

This is a list of Croatian football transfers in the 2016 summer transfer window by club. Only clubs in the 2016–17 Croatian First Football League are included.

== Croatian First Football League ==
=== Cibalia ===
In:

No.	Pos.	Nation	Player

Out:

No.	Pos.	Nation	Player

=== Dinamo Zagreb ===
In:

No.	Pos.	Nation	Player
91	DF	CRO	Marko Lešković (from (Croatia) Rijeka)

Out:

No.	Pos.	Nation	Player
7	FW	CRO	Josip Brekalo (to (Germany) VfL Wolfsburg)
–	MF	CRO	Franko Andrijašević (to (Croatia) Rijeka)

=== Hajduk Split ===
In:

No.	Pos.	Nation	Player
9	FW	HUN	Márkó Futács (from (Turkey) Mersin İdmanyurdu)
18	MF	BIH	Zvonimir Kožulj (from (Bosnia and Herzegovina) Široki Brijeg)
20	MF	AUS	Anthony Kalik (from (Australia) Central Coast Mariners)
22	FW	GHA	Said Ahmed Said (from (Portugal) Olhanense)
27	DF	ALB	Hysen Memolla (from (Italy) Verona)
44	DF	CRO	Marko Ćosić (on loan from (Croatia) Inter Zaprešić)
50	MF	CRO	Ante Erceg (from (Turkey) Balıkesirspor)

Out:

No.	Pos.	Nation	Player
2	DF	ARG	Julián Velázquez (loan return to (Italy) Palermo)
22	FW	VEN	Manuel Arteaga (loan return to (Italy) Palermo)
44	MF	CRO	Ante Roguljić (loan return to (Austria) Red Bull Salzburg)

=== Inter Zaprešić ===
In:

No.	Pos.	Nation	Player

Out:

No.	Pos.	Nation	Player
25	DF	CRO	Marko Ćosić (to (Croatia) Hajduk Split)

=== Istra 1961 ===
In:

No.	Pos.	Nation	Player
18	DF	MKD	Risto Mitrevski (from (North Macedonia) Metalurg Skopje)
99	DF	NGA	Jamilu Collins (on loan from (Croatia) Rijeka)
9	FW	NGA	Theophilus Solomon (on loan from (Croatia) Rijeka)
–	DF	CRO	Mato Miloš (on loan from (Croatia) Rijeka)
–	DF	CRO	Mateo Bertoša (from (Croatia) Rijeka)

Out:

No.	Pos.	Nation	Player
18	MF	SRB	Milan Đurić (to (Azerbaijan) Zira)

=== Lokomotiva ===
In:

No.	Pos.	Nation	Player

Out:

No.	Pos.	Nation	Player

=== Osijek ===
In:

No.	Pos.	Nation	Player

Out:

No.	Pos.	Nation	Player

=== Rijeka ===
In:

No.	Pos.	Nation	Player
5	MF	CRO	Dario Čanađija (loan return from (Italy) Spezia)
27	MF	CRO	Josip Mišić (loan return from (Italy) Spezia)
12	GK	CRO	Simon Sluga (loan return from (Italy) Spezia)
21	MF	NGA	Goodness Ajayi (loan return from (Bosnia and Herzegovina) Široki Brijeg)
19	MF	CRO	Tomislav Turčin (loan return from (Croatia) Cibalia)
18	DF	CRO	Josip Elez (on loan from (Italy) Lazio)
22	DF	MNE	Aleksandar Šofranac (from (Montenegro) Sutjeska)
99	FW	BIH	Haris Handžić (from (Russia) Ufa)
77	DF	CRO	Ivan Martić (from (Italy) Spezia)
23	MF	CRO	Franko Andrijašević (from (Croatia) Dinamo Zagreb)
20	MF	AUT	Alexander Gorgon (from Austria Wien)
11	MF	SVN	Matic Črnic (from (Slovenia) Domžale)

Out:

No.	Pos.	Nation	Player
21	DF	SVN	Aleš Mejač (loan return to (Slovenia) Maribor)
25	GK	CRO	Ivan Vargić (loan return to (Italy) Lazio)
22	MF	MNE	Asmir Kajević (to (Serbia) Čukarički)
–	MF	NGA	Aliyu Okechukwu (to (Croatia) RNK Split)
9	FW	ALB	Bekim Balaj (to (Russia) Terek Grozny)
–	DF	NGA	Jamilu Collins (on loan to (Croatia) Istra 1961)
19	DF	SVN	Miral Samardžić (to (China) Henan Jianye)
–	MF	BIH	Damir Zlomislić (to (Turkey) Gaziantep BB)
30	MF	CRO	Josip Brezovec (to (Moldova) Sheriff)
–	MF	BIH	Zoran Kvržić (on loan to (Moldova) Sheriff)
–	FW	CRO	Filip Dangubić (on loan to (Slovenia) Krško)
–	GK	NGA	David Nwolokor (on loan to (Bosnia and Herzegovina) Vitez)
16	MF	CRO	Ivan Močinić (to (Austria) Rapid Wien)
33	DF	CRO	Mihael Rebernik (on loan to (Slovenia) Aluminij)
23	MF	ALB	Odise Roshi (to (Russia) Terek Grozny)
13	DF	CRO	Marko Lešković (to (Croatia) Dinamo Zagreb)
9	FW	NGA	Theophilus Solomon (on loan to (Croatia) Istra 1961)
–	GK	NGA	Ayotunde Ikuepamitan (on loan to (Croatia) Šibenik)
–	DF	NGA	Yusuf Musa (to (Croatia) Šibenik)
–	DF	BIH	Jozo Špikić (to (Croatia) Imotski)
7	MF	CRO	Marin Tomasov (on loan to (Saudi Arabia) Al-Nassr)
11	FW	SVN	Roman Bezjak (to (Germany) Darmstadt 98)
–	DF	CRO	Niko Datković (to (Italy) Spezia)
–	FW	CRO	Andrija Filipović (to (Italy) Siena)
–	DF	CRO	Mato Miloš (on loan to (Croatia) Istra 1961)
24	DF	CRO	Mateo Bertoša (to (Croatia) Istra 1961)

=== Slaven Belupo ===
In:

No.	Pos.	Nation	Player
6	MF	FRA	Selim Bouadla (from (Portugal) Académica de Coimbra)

Out:

No.	Pos.	Nation	Player
21	MF	CRO	Nikola Jambor (to (Belgium) Lokeren)
30	MF	CRO	Filip Ozobić (to (Azerbaijan) Gabala)
—	DF	BRA	Edson (to (Cyprus) Apollon Limassol)

=== RNK Split ===
In:

No.	Pos.	Nation	Player
—	MF	ALB	Elis Bakaj (from (Albania) Tirana)
—	MF	NGA	Aliyu Okechukwu (from (Croatia) Rijeka)

Out:

No.	Pos.	Nation	Player
