= 2016–17 HNK Rijeka season =

Rijeka
2016–17 season
- Chairman: Damir Mišković
- Manager: Matjaž Kek
- Stadium: Rujevica
- Prva HNL: 1st
- Croatian Cup: Winners
- UEFA Europa League: Third qualifying round
- Top goalscorer: League: Franko Andrijašević (16); All: Franko Andrijašević; Mario Gavranović (18 each)
- Highest home attendance: 6,004 v Dinamo Zagreb (8 April 2017)
- Lowest home attendance: 3,022 v Lokomotiva (13 August 2016)
- Average home league attendance: 4,757
- Biggest win: 4–0 v Cibalia (21 May 2017)
- Biggest defeat: 2–5 v Dinamo Zagreb (27 May 2017)
| Home colours | Away colours | Third colours |
- All statistics correct as of 31 May 2017.

The 2016–17 season was the 71st season in HNK Rijeka’s history. It was their 26th successive season in the Croatian First Football League, and 43rd successive top tier season.

== Season overview ==
=== European elimination and strong league start ===
Rijeka began their competitive campaign with a 3–0 away victory over RNK Split on 16 July 2016. In the 2016–17 UEFA Europa League, they entered in the third qualifying round against İstanbul Başakşehir. Following a goalless first leg in Istanbul, Roman Bezjak scored twice in the return at Rujevica, but two goals from Edin Višća secured a 2–2 draw for the Turkish side. Rijeka were eliminated on the away-goals rule despite remaining unbeaten across the tie.

Rijeka nevertheless made a strong start to their domestic campaign. They won five of their opening six league matches, including a 4–2 victory away to Hajduk Split. On 18 September, Rijeka defeated defending champions Dinamo Zagreb 5–2 at Rujevica, with Alexander Gorgon and Marko Vešović scoring twice each. Rijeka remained unbeaten throughout the first half of the league season and entered the winter break at the top of the table.

=== League and cup campaigns ===
Rijeka continued their unbeaten league run after the winter break, winning their first five matches of 2017. In the 2016–17 Croatian Football Cup, they defeated Đakovo Croatia, Rudeš and Lokomotiva to reach the semi-finals. Mario Gavranović scored a hat-trick in a 3–1 first-leg victory over Osijek, before a 2–0 away win completed a 5–1 aggregate victory and secured a place in the final against Dinamo Zagreb.

Rijeka's unbeaten league run ended in their 32nd match with a 1–0 defeat away to Lokomotiva on 6 May. Kek's side responded with three consecutive victories, defeating Hajduk Split, Slaven Belupo and Cibalia. The 4–0 victory over Cibalia at Rujevica on 21 May secured the first Croatian league championship in the club's history with one match remaining and ended Dinamo Zagreb's sequence of eleven consecutive titles.

=== Historic double ===
Rijeka finished the league season with 88 points from 36 matches, recording 27 victories, seven draws and two defeats. They scored 71 goals and conceded 23, finishing two points ahead of Dinamo Zagreb. Their only two league defeats came during the final five rounds, including a 5–2 loss to Dinamo after the championship had already been secured.

Four days after the final league match, Rijeka faced Dinamo again in the Croatian Cup final at Stadion Varteks in Varaždin. Gavranović scored twice and Dario Župarić added a third as Rijeka won 3–1, completing the first league-and-cup double in the club's history.

Across all competitions, Rijeka won 33 of their 44 matches and suffered only two defeats. Franko Andrijašević was the club's leading league scorer with 16 goals, while Andrijašević and Gavranović shared the overall season record with 18 goals each.

== Competitions ==
=== Overall ===
| Competition | First match | Last match | Starting round | Final position | Record | | | | | | | |
| Competition | First match | Last match | Starting round | Final position | G | W | D | L | GF | GA | GD | Win % |
|---|---|---|---|---|---|---|---|---|---|---|---|---|
| MAXtv Prva liga | 16 Jul 2016 | 27 May 2017 | Matchday 1 | Winners | 36 | 27 | 7 | 2 | 71 | 23 | +48 | 75.00 |
| Croatian Cup | 21 Sep 2016 | 31 May 2017 | First round | Winners | 6 | 6 | 0 | 0 | 19 | 6 | +13 | 100.00 |
| UEFA Europa League | 28 Jul 2016 | 4 Aug 2016 | QR3 | QR3 | 2 | 0 | 2 | 0 | 2 | 2 | +0 | 0.00 |
| Total | | | | | 44 | 33 | 9 | 2 | 92 | 31 | +61 | 75.00 |

Last updated: 31 May 2017.

=== MAXtv Prva liga ===
==== Classification ====
| Pos | Team | Pld | W | D | L | GF | GA | GD | Pts | Qualification or relegation |
|---|---|---|---|---|---|---|---|---|---|---|
| 1 | Rijeka (C) | 36 | 27 | 7 | 2 | 71 | 23 | +48 | 88 | Qualification to Champions League second qualifying round |
| 2 | Dinamo Zagreb | 36 | 27 | 5 | 4 | 68 | 24 | +44 | 86 | Qualification to Europa League third qualifying round (Note: Since winners of 2016–17 Croatian Football Cup, Rijeka, qualified for Champions League, the spot awarded to the cup winner (Europa League third qualifying round) was passed to the runners-up and all other spots were adjusted accordingly.) |
| 3 | Hajduk Split | 36 | 20 | 9 | 7 | 70 | 31 | +39 | 69 | Qualification to Europa League second qualifying round |
| 4 | Osijek | 36 | 20 | 6 | 10 | 52 | 37 | +15 | 66 | Qualification to Europa League first qualifying round |
| 5 | Lokomotiva | 36 | 12 | 8 | 16 | 41 | 38 | +3 | 44 | |

Source: Prva HNL (in Croatian), Soccerway
Rules for classification: 1) Points; 2) Head-to-head points; 3) Head-to-head goal difference; 4) Head-to-head goals scored (away goals if tied); 5) Goal difference; 6) Goals scored; 7) Play-off
(Note: Criteria 2-4 and 7 is only used if deciding Champion, teams to international competition or teams for relegation and in that case criteria 6 will not be used).
(C) Champions

==== Results summary ====
| Overall | | | | | | | | Home | | | | | | Away | | | | | |
| Pld | W | D | L | GF | GA | GD | Pts | W | D | L | GF | GA | GD | W | D | L | GF | GA | GD |
|---|---|---|---|---|---|---|---|---|---|---|---|---|---|---|---|---|---|---|---|
| 36 | 27 | 7 | 2 | 71 | 23 | +48 | 88 | 17 | 1 | 0 | 41 | 8 | +33 | 10 | 6 | 2 | 30 | 15 | +15 |

Last updated: 27 May 2017.
Source: Competitive matches

==== Results by round ====
| Round | 1 | 2 | 3 | 4 | 5 | 6 | 7 | 8 | 9 | 10 | 11 | 12 | 13 | 14 | 15 | 16 | 17 | 18 | 19 | 20 | 21 | 22 | 23 | 24 | 25 | 26 | 27 | 28 | 29 | 30 | 31 | 32 | 33 | 34 | 35 | 36 |
|---|---|---|---|---|---|---|---|---|---|---|---|---|---|---|---|---|---|---|---|---|---|---|---|---|---|---|---|---|---|---|---|---|---|---|---|---|
| Ground | A | H | A | A | H | A | H | A | H | H | A | H | H | A | H | A | H | A | A | H | A | A | H | A | H | A | H | H | A | H | H | A | H | A | H | A |
| Result | W | W | W | D | W | W | W | D | W | W | W | W | W | W | W | D | W | D | W | W | W | W | W | D | W | W | D | W | D | W | W | L | W | W | W | L |
| Position | 1 | 1 | 1 | 2 | 2 | 1 | 1 | 1 | 1 | 1 | 1 | 1 | 1 | 1 | 1 | 1 | 1 | 1 | 1 | 1 | 1 | 1 | 1 | 1 | 1 | 1 | 1 | 1 | 1 | 1 | 1 | 1 | 1 | 1 | 1 | 1 |

Updated to match(es) played on 27 May 2017. Source: Competitive matches
A = Away; H = Home; W = Win; D = Draw; L = Loss

==== Results by opponent ====
| Team | Results | | | | Points |
| Team | 1 | 2 | 3 | 4 | Points |
|---|---|---|---|---|---|
| Cibalia | 0–0 | 2–0 | 3–0 | 4–0 | 10 |
| Dinamo Zagreb | 5–2 | 1–1 | 1–1 | 2–5 | 5 |
| Hajduk Split | 4–2 | 2–1 | 1–1 | 2–0 | 10 |
| Inter Zaprešić | 1–1 | 1–0 | 2–1 | 2–0 | 10 |
| Istra 1961 | 4–1 | 2–0 | 1–0 | 1–1 | 10 |
| Lokomotiva | 1–0 | 2–0 | 2–1 | 0–1 | 9 |
| Osijek | 1–0 | 3–0 | 3–2 | 2–0 | 12 |
| Slaven Belupo | 2–0 | 0–0 | 3–2 | 2–0 | 10 |
| RNK Split | 3–0 | 2–0 | 2–0 | 2–0 | 12 |

Source: 2016–17 Croatian First Football League article

== Matches ==
=== MAXtv Prva liga ===
| 16 July 2016 1 | RNK Split | 0–3 | Rijeka | Split |
| 21:00 CEST (UTC+02:00) | Jukić (yellow card) 90' | Report | Bezjak 7', 90+1'; Maleš (yellow card) 42'; Tomasov 75' | Stadium: Park Mladeži; Attendance: 467; Referee: Fran Jović (Zagreb) |

| 22 July 2016 2 | Rijeka | 4–1 | Istra 1961 | Rijeka |
| 20:00 CEST (UTC+02:00) | Gavranović 5', 55'; Bezjak 7', 27' | Report | Roce 65'; Polić (yellow card) 77' | Stadium: Rujevica; Attendance: 3,954; Referee: Marko Matoc (Zaprešić) |

| 31 July 2016 3 | Osijek | 0–1 | Rijeka | Osijek |
| 19:00 CEST (UTC+02:00) | Petrovikj (yellow card) 23' | Report | Ristovski (yellow card) 19'; Mišić 40' | Stadium: Gradski Vrt; Attendance: 4,019; Referee: Mario Zebec (Cestica) |

| 7 August 2016 4 | Inter Zaprešić | 1–1 | Rijeka | Zaprešić |
| 19:00 CEST (UTC+02:00) | Komorski (yellow card) 27'; Bosec (yellow card) 33'; Šoljić (yellow card) 53'; Čeliković (yellow card) 59'; Puljić 90+3' (pen.); Ottochian (yellow card) 90+3' | Report | Gavranović (penalty missed) 28' 90+1'; Maleš (yellow card) 41'; Šofranac (yellow card) 79' | Stadium: ŠRC Zaprešić; Attendance: 656; Referee: Tihomir Pejin (Donji Miholjac) |

| 13 August 2016 5 | Rijeka | 1–0 | Lokomotiva | Rijeka |
| 21:00 CEST (UTC+02:00) | Mitrović 11'; Maleš (yellow card) 20'; Zuta (yellow card) 48' | Report | Zagorac (yellow card) 45+1'; Šunjić (yellow card) 62'; Rožman (yellow card) 90+1' | Stadium: Rujevica; Attendance: 3,022; Referee: Damir Batinić (Osijek) |

| 21 August 2016 6 | Hajduk Split | 2–4 | Rijeka | Split |
| 21:00 CEST (UTC+02:00) | Ohandza 13' (pen.); Šimić (yellow card) 27'; Bilyi (yellow card) 35'; Ismajli 66'; Juranović (yellow card) 68'; Erceg (yellow card) 83' | Report | Bradarić (yellow card) 13'; Gavranović 24'; Bezjak 35' (pen.) 61' (yellow card) 68'; Vešović (yellow card) 73'; Andrijašević 79'; Mišić (yellow card) 87' | Stadium: Poljud; Attendance: 10,374; Referee: Fran Jović (Zagreb) |

| 27 August 2016 7 | Rijeka | 2–0 | Slaven Belupo | Rijeka |
| 21:00 CEST (UTC+02:00) | Matei 29'; Bezjak 58' (pen.) | Report | Musa (yellow card) 14'; Jovičić (yellow card) 28' (yellow-red card) 42'; Ivanovski (yellow card) 69' | Stadium: Rujevica; Attendance: 3,451; Referee: Andrej Burilo (Osijek) |

| 11 September 2016 8 | Cibalia | 0–0 | Rijeka | Vinkovci |
| 19:00 CEST (UTC+02:00) | Zgrablić (yellow card) 37'; Jerbić (yellow card) 90+3' | Report | Vešović (yellow card) 37'; Elez (yellow card) 77'; Gorgon (penalty missed) 90+5' | Stadium: HNK Cibalia; Attendance: 1,386; Referee: Igor Križarić (Čakovec) |

| 18 September 2016 9 | Rijeka | 5–2 | Dinamo Zagreb | Rijeka |
| 19:00 CEST (UTC+02:00) | Gavranović 1'; Gorgon 33', 55'; Vešović 49', 83'; Andrijašević (yellow card) 63' | Report | Benković (yellow card) 20'; Soudani 82'; Pavičić 86'; Henríquez (yellow card) 90+1' | Stadium: Rujevica; Attendance: 5,589; Referee: Ante Vučemilović-Šimunović (Osijek) |

| 25 September 2016 10 | Rijeka | 2–0 | RNK Split | Rijeka |
| 19:00 CEST (UTC+02:00) | Gorgon 30'; Andrijašević 45' | Report | Jurendić (yellow card) 65'; Vitus (yellow card) 81' | Stadium: Rujevica; Attendance: 3,891; Referee: Damir Batinić (Osijek) |

| 30 September 2016 11 | Istra 1961 | 0–2 | Rijeka | Pula |
| 18:00 CEST (UTC+02:00) | Stepčić (yellow card) 32'; Žižić (yellow card) 86' | Report | Črnic 8'; Gorgon 22'; Mišić (yellow card) 65' | Stadium: Aldo Drosina; Attendance: 3,984; Referee: Bruno Marić (Daruvar) |

| 16 October 2016 12 | Rijeka | 3–0 | Osijek | Rijeka |
| 15:00 CEST (UTC+02:00) | Andrijašević 37'; Gavranović 41'; Gorgon (yellow card) 56' (goal) 60' | Report | Knežević (yellow card) 1'; Arsenić (yellow card) 10' (yellow-red card) 71'; Vojnović (yellow card) 39'; Pušić (yellow card) 88' | Stadium: Rujevica; Attendance: 5,430; Referee: Fran Jović (Zagreb) |

| 23 October 2016 13 | Rijeka | 1–0 | Inter Zaprešić | Rijeka |
| 17:00 CEST (UTC+02:00) | Ristovski (yellow card) 31'; Andrijašević (yellow card) 57' (goal) 67' | Report | Altiparmakovski (yellow card) 43'; Mazalović (yellow card) 57'; Blažević (yellow card) 60'; Čeliković (yellow card) 64' | Stadium: Rujevica; Attendance: 4,011; Referee: Dario Bel (Osijek) |

| 30 October 2016 14 | Lokomotiva | 0–2 | Rijeka | Zagreb |
| 15:00 CET (UTC+01:00) | Capan (yellow card) 68'; Majer (yellow card) 78' | Report | Andrijašević 63'; Gorgon 79' | Stadium: Kranjčevićeva; Attendance: 790; Referee: Igor Križarić (Čakovec) |

| 5 November 2016 15 | Rijeka | 2–1 | Hajduk Split | Rijeka |
| 15:00 CET (UTC+01:00) | Ristovski (yellow card) 33'; Elez 66', 75'; Mišić (yellow card) 90+3' | Report | Jefferson (yellow card) 49'; Futács 60'; Memolla (yellow card) 87' | Stadium: Rujevica; Attendance: 5,508; Referee: Dalibor Mlakar (Zagreb) |

| 20 November 2016 16 | Slaven Belupo | 0–0 | Rijeka | Koprivnica |
| 17:00 CET (UTC+01:00) | Purić (yellow card) 74' | Report | Zuta (yellow card) 22'; Maleš (yellow card) 61'; Čanađija (yellow card) 90+1'; Vešović (yellow card) 90+2'; Andrijašević (red card) 90+3' | Stadium: Gradski; Attendance: 1,850; Referee: Andrej Burilo (Osijek) |

| 26 November 2016 17 | Rijeka | 2–0 | Cibalia | Rijeka |
| 17:00 CET (UTC+01:00) | Gorgon 17' (pen.); Matei 24' (pen.) | Report | Tomašević (yellow card) 81' | Stadium: Rujevica; Attendance: 3,329; Referee: Tihomir Pejin (Donji Miholjac) |

| 3 December 2016 18 | Dinamo Zagreb | 1–1 | Rijeka | Zagreb |
| 15:00 CET (UTC+01:00) | Gojak (yellow card) 31'; Jonas (yellow card) 75'; Sigali 77' (yellow card) 84' | Report | Mišić (yellow card) 16'; Bradarić (yellow card) 45+1'; Gorgon 51' (yellow card) 64' (yellow-red card) 70'; Martić (yellow card) 67'; Vešović (yellow card) 74'; Ristovski (yellow card) 90+6'; Prskalo (yellow card) 90+8' | Stadium: Maksimir; Attendance: 8,319; Referee: Ante Vučemilović-Šimunović (Osijek) |

| 11 December 2016 19 | RNK Split | 0–2 | Rijeka | Split |
| 17:00 CET (UTC+01:00) | Dupovac (yellow card) 53'; Duka (red card) 58'; Jurendić (red card) 85' | Report | Maleš (yellow card) 10'; Handžić (yellow card) 72'; Andrijašević 78', 87' (pen.) | Stadium: Park Mladeži; Attendance: 565; Referee: Bruno Marić (Daruvar) |

| 17 December 2016 20 | Rijeka | 1–0 | Istra 1961 | Rijeka |
| 17:15 CET (UTC+01:00) | Andrijašević 37' | Report | Gržan (yellow card) 64' | Stadium: Rujevica; Attendance: 4,471; Referee: Goran Gabrilo (Split) |

| 19 February 2017 21 | Osijek | 2–3 | Rijeka | Osijek |
| 15:00 CET (UTC+01:00) | Lopa 23'; Ejupi 30'; Pušić (yellow card) 67' | Report | Gavranović 18'; Andrijašević 56', 85'; Bradarić (yellow card) 71'; Črnic (yellow card) 76'; Gorgon (yellow card) 90+5' | Stadium: Gradski Vrt; Attendance: 4,219; Referee: Mario Zebec (Cestica) |

| 26 February 2017 22 | Inter Zaprešić | 1–2 | Rijeka | Zaprešić |
| 17:00 CET (UTC+01:00) | Filipović 9'; Mujagić (yellow card) 43'; Mazalović (yellow card) 45'; Puljić (yellow card) 50'; Šarić (yellow card) 87' | Report | Mišić 8'; Vešović (yellow card) 37'; Ristovski (yellow card) 38'; Filipović 48' (o.g.) | Stadium: ŠRC Zaprešić; Attendance: 3,069; Referee: Ante Vučemilović-Šimunović (Osijek) |

| 4 March 2017 23 | Rijeka | 2–1 | Lokomotiva | Rijeka |
| 17:00 CET (UTC+01:00) | Ristovski (yellow card) 36'; Bradarić 42'; Vešović (yellow card) 42'; Gorgon 57' | Report | Rožman (yellow card) 16'; Grezda (yellow card) 19'; Ćorić 36' (yellow card) 36'; Doležal (yellow card) 42'; Oluić (yellow card) 47'; Capan (yellow card) 50'; Kolinger (yellow card) 60' | Stadium: Rujevica; Attendance: 5,076; Referee: Goran Gabrilo (Split) |

| 11 March 2017 24 | Hajduk Split | 1–1 | Rijeka | Split |
| 17:00 CET (UTC+01:00) | Barry (yellow card) 19' (goal) 31'; Bašić (yellow card) 43'; Erceg (yellow card) 90+6' | Report | Kulušić (yellow card) 4'; Črnic (yellow card) 71'; Bezjak 81' (pen.); Bradarić (yellow card) 87'; Prskalo (yellow card) 89'; Čanađija (yellow card) 90+4' | Stadium: Poljud; Attendance: 15,462; Referee: Mario Zebec (Cestica) |

| 19 March 2017 25 | Rijeka | 3–2 | Slaven Belupo | Rijeka |
| 17:00 CET (UTC+01:00) | Andrijašević 34'; Jovičić 51' (o.g.); Vešović (yellow card) 53' (goal) 87'; Šofranac (yellow card) 68' | Report | Tadić 14'; Stevanović (yellow card) 69'; Héber 72'; Katić (yellow card) 90+1' | Stadium: Rujevica; Attendance: 5,360; Referee: Fran Jović (Zagreb) |

| 2 April 2017 26 | Cibalia | 0–3 | Rijeka | Vinkovci |
| 19:00 CEST (UTC+02:00) | Romić (yellow card) 26'; Mlakić (yellow card) 80' | Report | Mišić (yellow card) 21'; Bradarić 33'; Andrijašević 43'; Zuta (yellow card) 45+2'; Gorgon 45+3' | Stadium: HNK Cibalia; Attendance: 2,660; Referee: Ante Vučemilović-Šimunović (Osijek) |

| 8 April 2017 27 | Rijeka | 1–1 | Dinamo Zagreb | Rijeka |
| 19:00 CEST (UTC+02:00) | Matei (yellow card) 67'; Andrijašević 68'; Gavranović (yellow card) 71'; Mišić (yellow card) 74'; Bradarić (yellow card) 77' | Report | Mățel (yellow card) 24'; Sammir (yellow card) 77'; Soudani 86' | Stadium: Rujevica; Attendance: 6,004; Referee: Mario Zebec (Cestica) |

| 15 April 2017 28 | Rijeka | 2–0 | RNK Split | Rijeka |
| 15:00 CEST (UTC+02:00) | Maleš (yellow card) 34'; Gorgon 37'; Vešović 59'; Martić (yellow card) 77' | Report | Pešić (yellow card) 50' | Stadium: Rujevica; Attendance: 4,211; Referee: Marko Matoc (Zaprešić) |

| 22 April 2017 29 | Istra 1961 | 1–1 | Rijeka | Pula |
| 19:00 CEST (UTC+02:00) | Pavić (yellow card) 10'; Gržan 58' (pen.) | Report | Gorgon 38'; Mišić (yellow card) 90' | Stadium: Aldo Drosina; Attendance: 4,746; Referee: Fran Jović (Zagreb) |

| 25 April 2017 30 | Rijeka | 2–0 | Osijek | Rijeka |
| 20:00 CEST (UTC+02:00) | Bezjak 11' (pen.); Bradarić (yellow card) 14'; Mišić (yellow card) 44'; Andrijašević 90' (pen.) | Report | Matas (yellow card) 11'; Ejupi (yellow card) 14' (yellow-red card) 45+1'; Mioč (yellow card) 45+1'; Pušić (yellow card) 82' | Stadium: Rujevica; Attendance: 5,072; Referee: Igor Križarić (Čakovec) |

| 29 April 2017 31 | Rijeka | 2–0 | Inter Zaprešić | Rijeka |
| 19:00 CEST (UTC+02:00) | Gavranović 20' (yellow card) 76'; Bezjak 25' (pen.) | Report | Bosec (red card) 24'; Šarić (yellow card) 73' | Stadium: Rujevica; Attendance: 5,496; Referee: Duje Strukan (Split) |

| 6 May 2017 32 | Lokomotiva | 1–0 | Rijeka | Zagreb |
| 19:00 CEST (UTC+02:00) | Kolinger (yellow card) 71'; Karimi (yellow card) 80'; Majer 90+2' (pen.); Šemper (yellow card) 90+4' | Report | Bradarić (yellow card) 51'; Elez (yellow card) 88'; Andrijašević (yellow card) 90+2' | Stadium: Kranjčevićeva; Attendance: 2,280; Referee: Igor Križarić (Čakovec) |

| 13 May 2017 33 | Rijeka | 2–0 | Hajduk Split | Rijeka |
| 17:00 CEST (UTC+02:00) | Ristovski (yellow card) 9'; Maleš 14'; Gavranović 29'; Vešović (yellow card) 42'; Župarić (yellow card) 45+3'; Bezjak (yellow card) 62' | Report | Erceg (yellow card) 9'; Tudor (yellow card) 63'; Nižić (yellow card) 76'; Ohandza (yellow card) 86' | Stadium: Rujevica; Attendance: 5,792; Referee: Mario Zebec (Cestica) |

| 17 May 2017 34 | Slaven Belupo | 0–2 | Rijeka | Koprivnica |
| 20:00 CEST (UTC+02:00) | Ivanovski (yellow card) 90' | Report | Andrijašević 14'; Vešović 42' (yellow card) 65' | Stadium: Gradski; Attendance: 2,751; Referee: Dalibor Mlakar (Zagreb) |

| 21 May 2017 35 | Rijeka | 4–0 | Cibalia | Rijeka |
| 19:00 CEST (UTC+02:00) | Gavranović 11', 15'; Bezjak 45+1'; Župarić 72' | Report | Brekalo (yellow card) 9'; Mijoković (yellow card) 19'; Markić (yellow card) 37'; Rubić (yellow card) 51' | Stadium: Rujevica; Attendance: 5,961; Referee: Ante Vučemilović-Šimunović (Osijek) |

| 27 May 2017 36 | Dinamo Zagreb | 5–2 | Rijeka | Zagreb |
| 19:00 CEST (UTC+02:00) | Soudani 4', 33', 44' (yellow card) 77'; Pivarić (yellow card) 6'; Olmo 47' (yellow card) 60'; Hodžić 51' | Report | Maleš (yellow card) 36'; Vešović 45+1'; Bradarić (yellow card) 54'; Andrijašević (penalty missed) 62' (yellow card) 75' (goal) 83' | Stadium: Maksimir; Attendance: 13,456; Referee: Mario Zebec (Cestica) |

Source: Croatian Football Federation

=== Croatian Cup ===
| 21 September 2016 R1 | Đakovo Croatia | 0–3 | Rijeka | Đakovo |
| 15:30 CEST (UTC+02:00) | Nikolić (yellow card) 22'; Stipanović (yellow card) 32' | Report | Gorgon (yellow card) 25' (goal) 45+1'; Bradarić (yellow card) 38'; Črnic 51'; Gavranović 57' | Stadium: Gradski; Attendance: 1,200; Referee: Fran Jović (Zagreb) |

| 26 October 2016 R2 | Rudeš | 3–5 (a.e.t.) | Rijeka | Zagreb |
| 14:00 CEST (UTC+02:00) | Topić 53' (pen.) 62' (pen.) 80' (pen.); Borevković (yellow card) 56'; Mlakić (yellow card) 64'; Barišić (yellow card) 81'; Kamenar (yellow card) 89'; Hussain (yellow card) 97' | Report | Gavranović 5' (pen.); Mitrović 8' (yellow card) 79'; Andrijašević 32'; Mišić (yellow card) 81'; Šofranac 104'; Gorgon 108' | Stadium: ŠC Rudeš; Attendance: 800; Referee: Marko Matoc (Zaprešić) |

| 29 November 2016 QF | Lokomotiva | 1–3 | Rijeka | Zagreb |
| 16:00 CET (UTC+01:00) | Zagorac (yellow card) 41'; Capan (yellow card) 59'; Çekiçi (yellow card) 74'; Maleš 79' (o.g.) | Report | Maleš 21'; Matei (yellow card) 31'; Ristovski 38'; Gorgon 42' (pen.); Handžić (yellow card) 90+2' | Stadium: Kranjčevićeva; Attendance: 320; Referee: Marko Matoc (Zaprešić) |

| 1 March 2017 SF | Rijeka | 3–1 | Osijek | Rijeka |
| 18:30 CET (UTC+01:00) | Zuta (yellow card) 3'; Gavranović 9', 23', 71'; Elez (yellow card) 49' | Report | Barišić (yellow card) 21'; Barać (yellow card) 40'; Lesjak (yellow card) 62'; Grgić (yellow card) 67'; Perošević 75' (pen.) | Stadium: Rujevica; Attendance: 5,105; Referee: Fran Jović (Zagreb) |

| 15 March 2017 SF | Osijek | 0–2 (1–5 agg.) | Rijeka | Osijek |
| 17:00 CET (UTC+01:00) | Matas (yellow card) 9'; Lesjak (red card) 49' | Report | Andrijašević (yellow card) 25' (goal) 57'; Vešović (yellow card) 49'; Škorić 52' (o.g.) | Stadium: Gradski Vrt; Attendance: 4,467; Referee: Duje Strukan (Split) |

| 31 May 2017 Final | Dinamo Zagreb | 1–3 | Rijeka | Varaždin |
| 20:15 CEST (UTC+02:00) | Pivarić (yellow card) 30'; Olmo 37'; Hodžić (yellow card) 43'; Henríquez (yellow card) 79' | Report | Gavranović 24', 46'; Vešović (yellow card) 28'; Elez (yellow card) 36'; Ristovski (yellow card) 39'; Andrijašević (yellow card) 51'; Župarić 73'; Bradarić (yellow card) 89' | Stadium: Varteks; Attendance: 8,183; Referee: Ante Vučemilović-Šimunović (Osijek) |

Source: Croatian Football Federation

=== UEFA Europa League ===
| 28 July 2016 QR3 | İstanbul Başakşehir (Turkey) | 0–0 | (Croatia) Rijeka | Istanbul, Turkey |
| 19:30 CEST (UTC+02:00) | | Report | Bradarić (yellow card) 24'; Vešović (yellow card) 42' | Stadium: Başakşehir Fatih Terim; Attendance: 5,768; Referee: Svein-Erik Edvartsen (Norway) |

| 4 August 2016 QR3 | Rijeka (Croatia) | 2–2 (2–2 agg.) | (Turkey) İstanbul Başakşehir | Rijeka, Croatia |
| 20:15 CEST (UTC+02:00) | Mitrović (yellow card) 24'; Bezjak 24', 50' (pen.); Gavranović (yellow card) 80' | Report | Uçar (yellow card) 32'; Belözoğlu (yellow card) 34'; Višća 42', 74'; Tekdemir (yellow card) 57'; Batdal (yellow card) 80'; Ünder (yellow card) 90+2' | Stadium: Rujevica; Attendance: 5,524; Referee: Marius Avram (Romania) |

Source: uefa.com

=== Friendlies ===
==== Pre-season ====
| 16 June 2016 Friendly | Opatija | 2–7 | Rijeka | Opatija |
| 18:00 CEST (UTC+02:00) | T. Rudan 29'; Radomir 82' (pen.) | Report | Brezovec 20'; Matei 27'; Bradarić 41'; Solomon 43'; Gerald 54', 58'; Ajayi 72' | Stadium: Igralište Opatije; Attendance: 300; Referee: Marko Linić (Dražice) |

| 21 June 2016 Friendly | Polet Snašići | 0–9 | Rijeka | Snašići, Labin |
| 17:30 CEST (UTC+02:00) | | Report | Turčin 12'; Močinić 13'; Ajayi 15', 29', 32'; Tomasov 58', 72', 85'; Matei 88' | Stadium: Mjesno igralište Attendance: 250; Referee: Sandi Orbanić (Žminj) |

| 25 June 2016 Friendly | Gorica (Slovenia) | 0–0 | (Croatia) Rijeka | Kranjska Gora, Slovenia |
| 18:00 CEST (UTC+02:00) | | Report | | Stadium: Športni park Rudeč; Attendance: Behind closed doors Referee: Marko Podgoršek (Kranj) |

| 29 June 2016 Friendly | Rijeka (Croatia) | 2–1 | (Albania) Skënderbeu Korçë | Kranjska Gora, Slovenia |
| 17:30 CEST (UTC+02:00) | Mišić 21'; Matei 30' | Report | James 37' | Stadium: Športni park Rudeč; Attendance: 100; Referee: Andrej Žnidaršič (Kranj) |

| 2 July 2016 Friendly | Rijeka (Croatia) | 0–1 | (Ukraine) Zorya Luhansk | Kranj, Slovenia |
| 17:30 CEST (UTC+02:00) | | Report | Lipartia 66' | Stadium: Stanko Mlakar; Attendance: 50; Referee: Nejc Kajtazovič (Kranj) |

| 6 July 2016 Friendly | Rijeka (Croatia) | 2–2 | (Slovenia) Aluminij | Rijeka, Croatia |
| 19:15 CEST (UTC+02:00) | Ajayi 25'; Matei 90' (pen.) | Report | Vrbanec 41', 68' | Stadium: Rujevica; Attendance: 1,500; Referee: Vedran Jelenčić (Kastav) |

| 9 July 2016 Friendly | Rijeka (Croatia) | 2–0 | (Slovenia) Koper | Rijeka, Croatia |
| 20:00 CEST (UTC+02:00) | Gavranović 77'; Roshi 86' | Report | | Stadium: Rujevica; Attendance: 821; Referee: Marko Linić (Dražice) |

==== On-season (2016) ====
| 16 August 2016 Friendly | Naprijed | 2–7 | Rijeka | Hreljin |
| 18:00 CEST (UTC+02:00) | Ende 51'; Tomić 79' | Report | Handžić 21', 28', 34'; Gorgon 39'; Vizinger 64', 87'; Turčin 90' | Stadium: Igralište Lonja; Attendance: 300; Referee: Vedran Jelenčić (Kastav) |

| 24 August 2016 Friendly | Grobničan | 0–6 | Rijeka | Čavle |
| 18:00 CEST (UTC+02:00) | | Report | Handžić 17'; Matei 29'; Martić 42'; Šantek 48', 57'; Rilov 87' | Stadium: Mavrinci; Attendance: 400; Referee: Vedran Jelenčić (Kastav) |

| 2 September 2016 Friendly | Rijeka (Croatia) | 1–0 | (Slovenia) Celje | Rijeka, Croatia |
| 18:30 CEST (UTC+02:00) | Mišić 82' | Report | | Stadium: Rujevica; Attendance: 500; Referee: Marko Cvijović (Rijeka) |

| 6 September 2016 Friendly | Halubjan | 0–4 | Rijeka | Viškovo |
| 17:30 CEST (UTC+02:00) | | Report | Gorgon 28'; Ajayi 35'; Gavranović 70', 84' | Stadium: Igralište Brnasi; Attendance: 300; Referee: Vedran Jelenčić (Kastav) |

| 19 October 2016 Friendly | Rijeka | 6–0 | Naprijed | Rijeka |
| 18:00 CEST (UTC+02:00) | Handžić 30', 30', 40'; Črnic 36', 64'; Lepinjica 85' | Report | | Stadium: Rujevica; Attendance: 300; Referee: Marko Cvijović (Rijeka) |

| 9 November 2016 Friendly | Rijeka | 9–1 | Grobničan | Rijeka |
| 18:00 CET (UTC+01:00) | Matei 17', 21'; Handžić 20', 33'; Andrijašević 25'; Turčin 58', 73', 86', 89' | Report | Prtenjača 68' | Stadium: Rujevica; Attendance: 300; Referee: Marko Cvijović (Rijeka) |

| 15 November 2016 Friendly | Rijeka | 4–0 | Krk | Rijeka |
| 17:00 CET (UTC+01:00) | Gorgon 50' (pen.); Matei 56', 77'; Handžić 68' | Report | | Stadium: Rujevica; Attendance: 300; Referee: Vedran Jelenčić (Kastav) |

==== Mid-season ====
| 19 January 2017 Friendly | Rijeka | 5–1 | Bjelovar | Rijeka |
| 15:00 CET (UTC+01:00) | Gavranović 6'; Gorgon 37'; Vešović 44'; Ajayi 61', 79' | Report | Tominac 29' | Stadium: Rujevica (training ground); Attendance: 200; Referee: Marko Cvijović (Rijeka) |

| 21 January 2017 Friendly | Rijeka (Croatia) | 4–0 | (Slovenia) Triglav | Rijeka, Croatia |
| 14:00 CET (UTC+01:00) | Andrijašević 24'; Črnic 69'; Kovačević 72'; Turčin 79' | Report | | Stadium: Rujevica (training ground); Attendance: 300; Referee: Marko Linić (Dražice) |

| 26 January 2017 Friendly | Rijeka (Croatia) | 3–2 | (Slovenia) Celje | Rijeka, Croatia |
| 14:30 CET (UTC+01:00) | Gorgon 36'; Črnic 74'; Zuta 82' | Report | Hadžić 18'; Belić 68' | Stadium: Rujevica (training ground); Attendance: 250; Referee: Vedran Jelenčić (Kastav) |

| 1 February 2017 Atlantic Cup | Rijeka (Croatia) | 3–0 | (Denmark) Aarhus | Parchal, Portugal |
| 16:00 GMT (UTC±00:00) | Matei 73', 80'; Gorgon 83' | Report | | Stadium: Estádio Municipal da Bela Vista; Attendance: 200; Referee: Zbyněk Proske (Czech Republic) |

| 4 February 2017 Atlantic Cup | Rijeka (Croatia) | 1–0 | (Sweden) Djurgården | Parchal, Portugal |
| 13:00 GMT (UTC±00:00) | Andrijašević 22' | Report | | Stadium: Estádio Municipal da Bela Vista; Attendance: 200; Referee: Ondřej Pechanec (Czech Republic) |

| 7 February 2017 Atlantic Cup Final | Rijeka (Croatia) | 3–0 | (Czech Republic) Jablonec | Algarve, Portugal |
| 16:00 GMT (UTC±00:00) | Gavranović 51'; Gorgon 70'; Črnic 80' | Report | | Stadium: Estádio Algarve; Attendance: 200; Referee: Nuno Almeida (Portugal) |

| 11 February 2017 Friendly | Rijeka (Croatia) | 3–2 | (Slovenia) Domžale | Rijeka, Croatia |
| 16:00 CET (UTC+01:00) | Kulušić 54', 90'; Gavranović 60' | Report | Majer 11'; Franjić 34' | Stadium: Rujevica; Attendance: 1,941; Referee: Vedran Jelenčić (Kastav) |

| 14 February 2017 Friendly | Rijeka (Croatia) | 4–1 | (Slovenia) Ilirija 1911 | Rijeka, Croatia |
| 15:30 CET (UTC+01:00) | Matei 15' (pen.) 54', 79'; Ajayi 85' | Report | Nukić 56' | Stadium: Rujevica (training ground); Attendance: Behind closed doors Referee: Slaven Skender (Rijeka) |

==== On-season (2017) ====
| 22 February 2017 Friendly | Rijeka | 11–1 | Pazinka | Rijeka |
| 16:30 CET (UTC+01:00) | Kulušić 10'; Bezjak 21'; Ajayi 23'; Črnic 27'; Kovačević 60', 67'; Matei 62', 86' (pen.) 90'; Turčin 76', 81' | Report | Lepinjica 83' | Stadium: Rujevica (training ground); Attendance: Behind closed doors Referee: Vedran Jelenčić (Kastav) |

| 28 March 2017 Friendly | Rijeka | 6–0 | Naprijed | Rijeka |
| 19:45 CEST (UTC+02:00) | Gorgon 17', 24'; Gavranović 26'; Matei 29', 50'; Črnic 60' | Report | | Stadium: Rujevica; Attendance: Behind closed doors Referee: Marko Cvijović (Rijeka) |

| 11 April 2017 Friendly | Rijeka | 5–0 | Vinodol | Rijeka |
| 17:30 CEST (UTC+02:00) | Matei 18', 49' (pen.) 55'; M. Ristovski 85'; Črnic 86' | Report | | Stadium: Rujevica (training ground); Attendance: 100; Referee: Vedran Jelenčić (Kastav) |

== Player seasonal records ==
Updated 31 May 2017. Competitive matches only.

=== Goals ===
| Rank | Name | League | Europe | Cup | Total |
|---|---|---|---|---|---|
| 1 | (Croatia) Franko Andrijašević | 16 | – | 2 | 18 |
| 1 | (Switzerland) Mario Gavranović | 11 | – | 7 | 18 |
| 3 | (Austria) Alexander Gorgon | 12 | – | 3 | 15 |
| 4 | (Slovenia) Roman Bezjak | 11 | 2 | – | 13 |
| 5 | (Montenegro) Marko Vešović | 6 | – | – | 6 |
| 6 | (Croatia) Filip Bradarić | 2 | – | – | 2 |
| 6 | (Croatia) Josip Elez | 2 | – | – | 2 |
| 6 | (Romania) Florentin Matei | 2 | – | – | 2 |
| 6 | (Croatia) Josip Mišić | 2 | – | – | 2 |
| 6 | (Slovenia) Matic Črnic | 1 | – | 1 | 2 |
| 6 | (Croatia) Mate Maleš | 1 | – | 1 | 2 |
| 6 | (Croatia) Matej Mitrović | 1 | – | 1 | 2 |
| 6 | (Croatia) Dario Župarić | 1 | – | 1 | 2 |
| 14 | (Croatia) Marin Tomasov | 1 | – | – | 1 |
| 14 | (North Macedonia) Stefan Ristovski | – | – | 1 | 1 |
| 14 | (Montenegro) Aleksandar Šofranac | – | – | 1 | 1 |
| Own goals | | 2 | – | 1 | 3 |
| TOTALS | | 71 | 2 | 19 | 92 |

Source: Competitive matches

=== Assists ===
| Rank | Name | League | Europe | Cup | Total |
|---|---|---|---|---|---|
| 1 | (Montenegro) Marko Vešović | 9 | 1 | 1 | 11 |
| 2 | (North Macedonia) Stefan Ristovski | 9 | – | – | 9 |
| 3 | (Croatia) Josip Mišić | 6 | – | 2 | 8 |
| 3 | (Croatia) Franko Andrijašević | 5 | – | 3 | 8 |
| 5 | (Croatia) Filip Bradarić | 4 | – | 3 | 7 |
| 6 | (Switzerland) Mario Gavranović | 5 | 1 | – | 6 |
| 7 | (Croatia) Josip Elez | 4 | – | 1 | 5 |
| 7 | (Austria) Alexander Gorgon | 4 | – | 1 | 5 |
| 7 | (Romania) Florentin Matei | 3 | – | 2 | 5 |
| 10 | (Slovenia) Roman Bezjak | 3 | – | – | 3 |
| 10 | (Switzerland) Ivan Martić | 3 | – | – | 3 |
| 10 | (North Macedonia) Leonard Zuta | 1 | – | 2 | 3 |
| 13 | (Nigeria) Goodness Ajayi | 2 | – | – | 2 |
| 13 | (Croatia) Marin Tomasov | 2 | – | – | 2 |
| 15 | (Croatia) Mate Maleš | 1 | – | – | 1 |
| 15 | (Albania) Odise Roshi | 1 | – | – | 1 |
| 15 | (Croatia) Dario Župarić | 1 | – | – | 1 |
| 15 | (Bosnia and Herzegovina) Haris Handžić | – | – | 1 | 1 |
| TOTALS | | 63 | 2 | 16 | 81 |

Source: Competitive matches

=== Clean sheets ===
| Rank | Name | League | Europe | Cup | Total |
|---|---|---|---|---|---|
| 1 | (Croatia) Andrej Prskalo | 21 | 1 | 1 | 23 |
| 2 | (Croatia) Simon Sluga | – | – | 1 | 1 |
| TOTALS | | 21 | 1 | 2 | 24 |

Source: Competitive matches

=== Disciplinary record ===
| Number | Position | Player | 1. HNL | | | Europe | | | Croatian Cup | | | Total | | |
|---|---|---|---|---|---|---|---|---|---|---|---|---|---|---|
| Number | Position | Player | Booked | (yellow card) (yellow-red card) | Sent off (straight red) | Booked | (yellow card) (yellow-red card) | Sent off (straight red) | Booked | (yellow card) (yellow-red card) | Sent off (straight red) | Booked | (yellow card) (yellow-red card) | Sent off (straight red) |
| 4 | DF | (Croatia) Ante Kulušić | 1 | 0 | 0 | 0 | 0 | 0 | 0 | 0 | 0 | 1 | 0 | 0 |
| 5 | MF | (Croatia) Dario Čanađija | 2 | 0 | 0 | 0 | 0 | 0 | 0 | 0 | 0 | 2 | 0 | 0 |
| 6 | DF | (North Macedonia) Stefan Ristovski | 7 | 0 | 0 | 0 | 0 | 0 | 1 | 0 | 0 | 8 | 0 | 0 |
| 8 | DF | (North Macedonia) Leonard Zuta | 3 | 0 | 0 | 0 | 0 | 0 | 1 | 0 | 0 | 4 | 0 | 0 |
| 10 | MF | (Romania) Florentin Matei | 1 | 0 | 0 | 0 | 0 | 0 | 1 | 0 | 0 | 2 | 0 | 0 |
| 11 | MF | (Slovenia) Matic Črnic | 2 | 0 | 0 | 0 | 0 | 0 | 0 | 0 | 0 | 2 | 0 | 0 |
| 13 | DF | (Croatia) Dario Župarić | 1 | 0 | 0 | 0 | 0 | 0 | 0 | 0 | 0 | 1 | 0 | 0 |
| 14 | FW | (Slovenia) Roman Bezjak | 2 | 0 | 0 | 0 | 0 | 0 | 0 | 0 | 0 | 2 | 0 | 0 |
| 15 | DF | (Croatia) Matej Mitrović | 0 | 0 | 0 | 1 | 0 | 0 | 1 | 0 | 0 | 2 | 0 | 0 |
| 17 | FW | (Switzerland) Mario Gavranović | 2 | 0 | 0 | 1 | 0 | 0 | 0 | 0 | 0 | 3 | 0 | 0 |
| 18 | DF | (Croatia) Josip Elez | 2 | 0 | 0 | 0 | 0 | 0 | 2 | 0 | 0 | 4 | 0 | 0 |
| 20 | MF | (Austria) Alexander Gorgon | 2 | 1 | 0 | 0 | 0 | 0 | 1 | 0 | 0 | 3 | 1 | 0 |
| 22 | DF | (Montenegro) Aleksandar Šofranac | 2 | 0 | 0 | 0 | 0 | 0 | 0 | 0 | 0 | 2 | 0 | 0 |
| 23 | MF | (Croatia) Franko Andrijašević | 4 | 0 | 1 | 0 | 0 | 0 | 2 | 0 | 0 | 6 | 0 | 1 |
| 26 | MF | (Croatia) Mate Maleš | 7 | 0 | 0 | 0 | 0 | 0 | 0 | 0 | 0 | 7 | 0 | 0 |
| 27 | MF | (Croatia) Josip Mišić | 8 | 0 | 0 | 0 | 0 | 0 | 1 | 0 | 0 | 9 | 0 | 0 |
| 28 | MF | (Croatia) Filip Bradarić | 8 | 0 | 0 | 1 | 0 | 0 | 2 | 0 | 0 | 11 | 0 | 0 |
| 29 | DF | (Montenegro) Marko Vešović | 9 | 0 | 0 | 1 | 0 | 0 | 2 | 0 | 0 | 12 | 0 | 0 |
| 32 | GK | (Croatia) Andrej Prskalo | 2 | 0 | 0 | 0 | 0 | 0 | 0 | 0 | 0 | 2 | 0 | 0 |
| 77 | DF | (Switzerland) Ivan Martić | 2 | 0 | 0 | 0 | 0 | 0 | 0 | 0 | 0 | 2 | 0 | 0 |
| 99 | FW | (Bosnia and Herzegovina) Haris Handžić | 1 | 0 | 0 | 0 | 0 | 0 | 1 | 0 | 0 | 2 | 0 | 0 |
| TOTALS | | | 68 | 1 | 1 | 4 | 0 | 0 | 15 | 0 | 0 | 87 | 1 | 1 |

Source: nk-rijeka.hr

=== Appearances and goals ===
| Number | Position | Player | Apps | Goals | Apps | Goals | Apps | Goals | Apps | Goals |
| Number | Position | Player | Total | | 1. HNL (Note: First number represents appearances in starting eleven, while the second number indicates a substitute appearance.) | | Europa League | | Croatian Cup | |
|---|---|---|---|---|---|---|---|---|---|---|
| 3 | MF | (Bosnia and Herzegovina) Jasmin Čeliković | 1 | 0 | 0+1 | 0 | 0+0 | 0 | 0+0 | 0 |
| 4 | DF | (Croatia) Ante Kulušić | 7 | 0 | 3+2 | 0 | 0+0 | 0 | 2+0 | 0 |
| 5 | MF | (Croatia) Dario Čanađija | 29 | 0 | 0+24 | 0 | 0+1 | 0 | 2+2 | 0 |
| 6 | DF | (North Macedonia) Stefan Ristovski | 41 | 1 | 33+0 | 0 | 2+0 | 0 | 4+2 | 1 |
| 7 | MF | (Croatia) Marin Tomasov | 4 | 1 | 2+0 | 1 | 2+0 | 0 | 0+0 | 0 |
| 8 | DF | (North Macedonia) Leonard Zuta | 43 | 0 | 34+1 | 0 | 2+0 | 0 | 5+1 | 0 |
| 10 | MF | (Romania) Florentin Matei | 23 | 2 | 9+9 | 2 | 0+2 | 0 | 3+0 | 0 |
| 11 | MF | (Slovenia) Matic Črnic | 13 | 2 | 1+10 | 1 | 0+0 | 0 | 1+1 | 1 |
| 12 | GK | (Croatia) Simon Sluga | 2 | 0 | 0+0 | 0 | 0+0 | 0 | 2+0 | 0 |
| 13 | DF | (Croatia) Dario Župarić | 12 | 2 | 11+0 | 1 | 0+0 | 0 | 1+0 | 1 |
| 14 | FW | (Slovenia) Roman Bezjak | 28 | 13 | 17+6 | 11 | 2+0 | 2 | 2+1 | 0 |
| 15 | DF | (Croatia) Matej Mitrović | 25 | 2 | 20+0 | 1 | 2+0 | 0 | 3+0 | 1 |
| 16 | MF | (Croatia) Ivan Močinić | 1 | 0 | 0+1 | 0 | 0+0 | 0 | 0+0 | 0 |
| 17 | FW | (Switzerland) Mario Gavranović | 36 | 18 | 27+2 | 11 | 2+0 | 0 | 4+1 | 7 |
| 18 | MF | (Croatia) Josip Elez | 40 | 2 | 34+0 | 2 | 2+0 | 0 | 4+0 | 0 |
| 20 | MF | (Austria) Alexander Gorgon | 31 | 15 | 21+4 | 12 | 0+0 | 0 | 5+1 | 3 |
| 21 | FW | (Nigeria) Goodness Ajayi | 8 | 0 | 0+7 | 0 | 0+0 | 0 | 0+1 | 0 |
| 22 | DF | (Montenegro) Aleksandar Šofranac | 10 | 1 | 4+3 | 0 | 0+0 | 0 | 2+1 | 1 |
| 23 | MF | (Croatia) Franko Andrijašević | 32 | 18 | 28+0 | 16 | 0+0 | 0 | 4+0 | 2 |
| 23 | MF | (Albania) Odise Roshi | 1 | 0 | 0+1 | 0 | 0+0 | 0 | 0+0 | 0 |
| 26 | MF | (Croatia) Mate Maleš | 31 | 2 | 16+9 | 1 | 2+0 | 0 | 1+3 | 1 |
| 27 | MF | (Croatia) Josip Mišić | 42 | 2 | 28+6 | 2 | 1+1 | 0 | 5+1 | 0 |
| 28 | MF | (Croatia) Filip Bradarić | 40 | 2 | 33+0 | 2 | 1+0 | 0 | 6+0 | 0 |
| 29 | DF | (Montenegro) Marko Vešović | 40 | 6 | 32+1 | 6 | 2+0 | 0 | 4+1 | 0 |
| 32 | GK | (Croatia) Andrej Prskalo | 42 | 0 | 36+0 | 0 | 2+0 | 0 | 4+0 | 0 |
| 77 | DF | (Switzerland) Ivan Martić | 19 | 0 | 6+11 | 0 | 0+0 | 0 | 1+1 | 0 |
| 99 | FW | (Bosnia and Herzegovina) Haris Handžić | 8 | 0 | 1+3 | 0 | 0+2 | 0 | 1+1 | 0 |

Source: nk-rijeka.hr

=== Suspensions ===
| Date Incurred | Competition | Player | Games Missed | Reason |
|---|---|---|---|---|
| 13 Aug 2016 | 1. HNL | (Croatia) Mate Maleš | 1 | Booked |
| 5 Nov 2016 | 1. HNL | (North Macedonia) Stefan Ristovski | 1 | Booked |
| 5 Nov 2016 | 1. HNL | (Croatia) Josip Mišić | 1 | Booked |
| 20 Nov 2016 | 1. HNL | (Montenegro) Marko Vešović | 1 | Booked |
| 20 Nov 2016 | 1. HNL | (Croatia) Franko Andrijašević | 3 | Sent off (straight red) |
| 3 Dec 2016 | 1. HNL | (Austria) Alexander Gorgon | 1 | (yellow card) (yellow-red card) |
| 19 Feb 2017 | 1. HNL | (Croatia) Filip Bradarić | 1 | Booked |
| 4 Mar 2017 | 1. HNL | (North Macedonia) Stefan Ristovski | 1 | Booked |
| 4 Mar 2017 | 1. HNL | (Montenegro) Marko Vešović | 1 | Booked |
| 2 Apr 2017 | 1. HNL | (North Macedonia) Leonard Zuta | 1 | Booked |
| 8 Apr 2017 | 1. HNL | (Croatia) Josip Mišić | 1 | Booked |
| 15 Apr 2017 | 1. HNL | (Croatia) Mate Maleš | 1 | Booked |
| 25 Apr 2017 | 1. HNL | (Croatia) Filip Bradarić | 1 | Booked |
| 6 May 2017 | 1. HNL | (Croatia) Franko Andrijašević | 1 | Booked |
| 17 May 2017 | 1. HNL | (Montenegro) Marko Vešović | 1 | Booked |

=== Penalties ===
For
| Date | Competition | Player | Opposition | Scored? |
|---|---|---|---|---|
| 4 Aug 2016 | UEL | (Slovenia) Roman Bezjak | Başakşehir | ✓ |
| 7 Aug 2016 | 1. HNL | (Switzerland) Mario Gavranović | Inter Zaprešić | ✗ |
| 21 Aug 2016 | 1. HNL | (Slovenia) Roman Bezjak | Hajduk Split | ✓ |
| 27 Aug 2016 | 1. HNL | (Slovenia) Roman Bezjak | Slaven Belupo | ✓ |
| 11 Sep 2016 | 1. HNL | (Austria) Alexander Gorgon | Cibalia | ✗ |
| 26 Oct 2016 | Cup | (Switzerland) Mario Gavranović | Rudeš | ✓ |
| 26 Nov 2016 | 1. HNL | (Austria) Alexander Gorgon | Cibalia | ✓ |
| 26 Nov 2016 | 1. HNL | (Romania) Florentin Matei | Cibalia | ✓ |
| 29 Nov 2016 | Cup | (Austria) Alexander Gorgon | Lokomotiva | ✓ |
| 11 Dec 2016 | 1. HNL | (Croatia) Franko Andrijašević | RNK Split | ✓ |
| 11 Mar 2017 | 1. HNL | (Slovenia) Roman Bezjak | Hajduk Split | ✓ |
| 25 Apr 2017 | 1. HNL | (Slovenia) Roman Bezjak | Osijek | ✓ |
| 25 Apr 2017 | 1. HNL | (Croatia) Franko Andrijašević | Osijek | ✓ |
| 29 Apr 2017 | 1. HNL | (Slovenia) Roman Bezjak | Inter Zaprešić | ✓ |
| 27 May 2017 | 1. HNL | (Croatia) Franko Andrijašević | Dinamo Zagreb | ✗ |
Against
| Date | Competition | Goalkeeper | Opposition | Scored? |
| 7 Aug 2016 | 1. HNL | (Croatia) Andrej Prskalo | Inter Zaprešić | ✓ |
| 21 Aug 2016 | 1. HNL | (Croatia) Andrej Prskalo | Hajduk Split | ✓ |
| 26 Oct 2016 | Cup | (Croatia) Simon Sluga | Rudeš | ✓ |
| 26 Oct 2016 | Cup | (Croatia) Simon Sluga | Rudeš | ✓ |
| 26 Oct 2016 | Cup | (Croatia) Simon Sluga | Rudeš | ✓ |
| 1 Mar 2017 | Cup | (Croatia) Andrej Prskalo | Osijek | ✓ |
| 22 Apr 2017 | 1. HNL | (Croatia) Andrej Prskalo | Istra 1961 | ✓ |
| 6 May 2017 | 1. HNL | (Croatia) Andrej Prskalo | Lokomotiva | ✓ |

=== Overview of statistics ===
| Statistic | Overall | 1. HNL | Croatian Cup | Europa League |
|---|---|---|---|---|
| Most appearances | Zuta (43) | Prskalo (36) | 5 players (6) | 13 players (2) |
| Most starts | Prskalo (42) | Prskalo (36) | Bradarić (6) | 10 players (2) |
| Most substitute appearances | Čanađija (27) | Čanađija (24) | Maleš (3) | Handžić & Matei (2) |
| Most minutes played | Prskalo (3,780) | Prskalo (3,240) | Bradarić (515) | 7 players (180) |
| Top goalscorer | Andrijašević & Gavranović (18) | Andrijašević (16) | Gavranović (7) | Bezjak (2) |
| Most assists | Vešović (11) | Ristovski & Vešović (9) | Andrijašević & Bradarić (3) | Gavranović & Vešović (1) |
| Most yellow cards | Vešović (12) | Vešović (9) | 4 players (2) | 4 players (1) |
| Most red cards | Andrijašević & Gorgon (1) | Andrijašević & Gorgon (1) | – | – |
Last updated: 31 May 2017.

== Transfers ==
=== In ===
| Date | Pos. | Player | Moving from | Type | Fee |
|---|---|---|---|---|---|
| 14 Jun 2016 | LB | (Nigeria) Jamilu Collins | (Croatia) Šibenik | Return from loan | —N/a |
| 14 Jun 2016 | CF | (Croatia) Filip Dangubić | (Slovenia) Krka | Return from loan | —N/a |
| 14 Jun 2016 | GK | (Nigeria) David Nwolokor | (Croatia) Šibenik | Return from loan | —N/a |
| 14 Jun 2016 | AM | (Nigeria) Aliyu Okechukwu | (Croatia) Šibenik | Return from loan | —N/a |
| 14 Jun 2016 | CF | (Nigeria) Theophilus Solomon | (Croatia) Šibenik | Return from loan | —N/a |
| 15 Jun 2016 | LW | (Nigeria) Goodness Ajayi | (Bosnia and Herzegovina) Široki Brijeg | Return from loan | —N/a |
| 15 Jun 2016 | LB | (Nigeria) Muhammed Kabiru | (Slovenia) Krka | Return from loan | —N/a |
| 15 Jun 2016 | LW | (Croatia) Anas Sharbini | (Turkey) Osmanlıspor | Return from loan | —N/a |
| 15 Jun 2016 | CB | (Bosnia and Herzegovina) Jozo Špikić | (Bosnia and Herzegovina) Široki Brijeg | Return from loan | —N/a |
| 15 Jun 2016 | RW | (Croatia) Tomislav Turčin | (Croatia) Cibalia | Return from loan | —N/a |
| 15 Jun 2016 | CM | (Bosnia and Herzegovina) Damir Zlomislić | (Croatia) Istra 1961 | Return from loan | —N/a |
| 30 Jun 2016 | CM | (Croatia) Dario Čanađija | (Italy) Spezia | Return from loan | —N/a |
| 30 Jun 2016 | CB | (Croatia) Niko Datković | (Switzerland) Lugano | Return from loan | —N/a |
| 30 Jun 2016 | CF | (Croatia) Andrija Filipović | (Italy) Spezia | Return from loan | —N/a |
| 30 Jun 2016 | RW | (Bosnia and Herzegovina) Zoran Kvržić | (Italy) Spezia | Return from loan | —N/a |
| 30 Jun 2016 | RB | (Croatia) Mato Miloš | (Italy) Perugia | Return from loan | —N/a |
| 30 Jun 2016 | CM | (Croatia) Josip Mišić | (Italy) Spezia | Return from loan | —N/a |
| 30 Jun 2016 | GK | (Croatia) Simon Sluga | (Italy) Spezia | Return from loan | —N/a |
| 1 Jul 2016 | RB | (North Macedonia) Stefan Ristovski | (Italy) Spezia | Loan (until 30/6/2017) | —N/a |
| 1 Jul 2016 | RW | (Montenegro) Marko Vešović | (Italy) Spezia | Loan (until 30/6/2017) | —N/a |
| 11 Jul 2016 | CB | (Croatia) Josip Elez | (Italy) Lazio | Loan (until 30/6/2017; option to buy for €450,000) | —N/a |
| 12 Jul 2016 | CB | (Montenegro) Aleksandar Šofranac | (Montenegro) Sutjeska | Transfer | Free |
| 19 Jul 2016 | CF | (Bosnia and Herzegovina) Haris Handžić | (Russia) Ufa | Transfer | Free |
| 29 Jul 2016 | AM | (Croatia) Franko Andrijašević | (Croatia) Dinamo Zagreb | Transfer | Free |
| 2 Aug 2016 | RB | (Switzerland) Ivan Martić | (Italy) Spezia | Transfer | Free |
| 16 Aug 2016 | RW | (Austria) Alexander Gorgon | Austria Wien | Transfer | Free |
| 30 Aug 2016 | LW | (Slovenia) Matic Črnic | (Slovenia) Domžale | Transfer | €500,000 |
| 24 Jan 2017 | CB | (Croatia) Dario Župarić | (Italy) Pescara | Loan (until 30/6/2018; option to buy for €800,000) | —N/a |
| 13 Feb 2017 | CB | (Nigeria) Bamidele Samuel Ayodeji | (Nigeria) Abuja Academy | Transfer | Free |
| 13 Feb 2017 | CB | (Croatia) Ante Kulušić | (Turkey) Gençlerbirliği | Transfer | Free |
| 14 Feb 2017 | AM | (North Macedonia) Milan Ristovski | (North Macedonia) Rabotnički | Loan (until 30/6/2017; option to buy) | —N/a |
| 14 Feb 2017 | CF | (Slovenia) Roman Bezjak | (Germany) Darmstadt 98 | Loan (until 30/6/2017) | —N/a |
| 17 Feb 2017 | DM | (Croatia) Bernardo Matić | (Croatia) NK Zagreb | Transfer | Free |
| 17 Feb 2017 | LB | (Bosnia and Herzegovina) Nikola Totić | (Croatia) Krk | Transfer | Free |

Source: Glasilo Hrvatskog nogometnog saveza

=== Out ===
| Date | Pos. | Player | Moving to | Type | Fee |
|---|---|---|---|---|---|
| 31 May 2016 | RB | (Slovenia) Aleš Mejač | (Slovenia) Maribor | End of loan | —N/a |
| 11 Jun 2016 | CB | (Croatia) Fausto Budicin | —N/a | Retirement | —N/a |
| 16 Jun 2016 | CM | (Montenegro) Asmir Kajević | (Serbia) Čukarički | Transfer | Free |
| 24 Jun 2016 | AM | (Nigeria) Aliyu Okechukwu | (Croatia) RNK Split | Transfer | Free |
| 28 Jun 2016 | CF | (Albania) Bekim Balaj | (Russia) Terek Grozny | Transfer | €1.3 million |
| 30 Jun 2016 | RB | (North Macedonia) Stefan Ristovski | (Italy) Spezia | End of loan | —N/a |
| 30 Jun 2016 | CB | (Slovenia) Miral Samardžić | (China) Henan Jianye | Transfer | €1.35 million |
| 30 Jun 2016 | GK | (Croatia) Ivan Vargić | (Italy) Lazio | End of loan | —N/a |
| 30 Jun 2016 | RB | (Montenegro) Marko Vešović | (Italy) Spezia | End of loan | —N/a |
| 6 Jul 2016 | CM | (Croatia) Josip Brezovec | (Moldova) Sheriff Tiraspol | Transfer | €250,000 |
| 7 Jul 2016 | LB | (Nigeria) Jamilu Collins | (Croatia) Istra 1961 | Loan (until 15/6/2017) | —N/a |
| 7 Jul 2016 | RW | (Bosnia and Herzegovina) Zoran Kvržić | (Moldova) Sheriff Tiraspol | Loan (until 15/6/2017; option to buy for $400,000) | —N/a |
| 8 Jul 2016 | CF | (Croatia) Filip Dangubić | (Slovenia) Krško | Loan (until 29/6/2017) | —N/a |
| 15 Jul 2016 | GK | (Nigeria) David Nwolokor | (Bosnia and Herzegovina) Vitez | Loan (until 15/6/2017) | —N/a |
| 20 Jul 2016 | CM | (Croatia) Ivan Močinić | (Austria) Rapid Wien | Transfer | €2 million |
| 25 Jul 2016 | CB | (Croatia) Marko Lešković | (Croatia) Dinamo Zagreb | Transfer | €2 million |
| 26 Jul 2016 | RW | (Albania) Odise Roshi | (Russia) Terek Grozny | Transfer | €500,000 |
| 26 Jul 2016 | CF | (Nigeria) Theophilus Solomon | (Croatia) Istra 1961 | Loan (until 15/6/2017) | —N/a |
| 28 Jul 2016 | CM | (Bosnia and Herzegovina) Damir Zlomislić | (Turkey) Gaziantep BB | Transfer | €50,000 |
| 1 Aug 2016 | GK | (Nigeria) Ayotunde Ikuepamitan | (Croatia) Šibenik | Loan (until 15/6/2017) | —N/a |
| 4 Aug 2016 | RB | (Croatia) Mihael Rebernik | (Slovenia) Aluminij | Loan (until 14/6/2017) | —N/a |
| 11 Aug 2016 | LB | (Nigeria) Yusuf Musa | (Croatia) Šibenik | Transfer | Free |
| 12 Aug 2016 | RW | (Croatia) Marin Tomasov | (Saudi Arabia) Al-Nassr | Loan (until 30/6/2017; option to buy for €2 mil.) | €800,000 |
| 16 Aug 2016 | CF | (Croatia) Mate Bajić | (Croatia) Val | Transfer | Free |
| 24 Aug 2016 | CB | (Bosnia and Herzegovina) Jozo Špikić | (Croatia) Imotski | Transfer | Free |
| 30 Aug 2016 | CF | (Slovenia) Roman Bezjak | (Germany) Darmstadt 98 | Transfer | €2.5 million |
| 31 Aug 2016 | CB | (Croatia) Niko Datković | (Italy) Spezia | Transfer | Free |
| 31 Aug 2016 | CF | (Croatia) Andrija Filipović | (Italy) Siena | Transfer | Free |
| 31 Aug 2016 | RB | (Croatia) Mato Miloš | (Croatia) Istra 1961 | Loan (until 14/6/2017; option to buy) | —N/a |
| 31 Aug 2016 | LB | (Croatia) Mateo Bertoša | (Croatia) Istra 1961 | Transfer | Free |
| 11 Jan 2017 | CB | (Croatia) Matej Mitrović | (Turkey) Beşiktaş | Transfer | €4.2 million |
| 22 Jan 2017 | CM | (Nigeria) Gerald Diyoke | (Croatia) Šibenik | Loan (until 15/6/2017) | —N/a |
| 23 Jan 2017 | CB | (Croatia) Frane Ikić | (Slovenia) Koper | Transfer | Free |
| 26 Jan 2017 | RM | (Croatia) Vedran Jugović | (South Korea) Jeonnam Dragons | Transfer | €500,000 |
| 30 Jan 2017 | CF | (Bosnia and Herzegovina) Haris Handžić | (Hungary) Debreceni | Transfer | Free |
| 3 Feb 2017 | CF | (Croatia) Dario Vizinger | (Croatia) Hrvatski Dragovoljac | Loan (until 15/6/2017) | —N/a |
| 13 Feb 2017 | RB | (Croatia) Mato Miloš | (Croatia) Istra 1961 | Transfer | Free |
| 15 Feb 2017 | LB | (Nigeria) Jamilu Collins | (Croatia) Šibenik | Loan (until 15/6/2017) | —N/a |

Source: Glasilo Hrvatskog nogometnog saveza

Spending: ▼€500,000
Income: ▲€15,450,000
Expenditure: ▲€14,950,000
