= Marko Vešović =

Montenegrin footballer (born 1991)

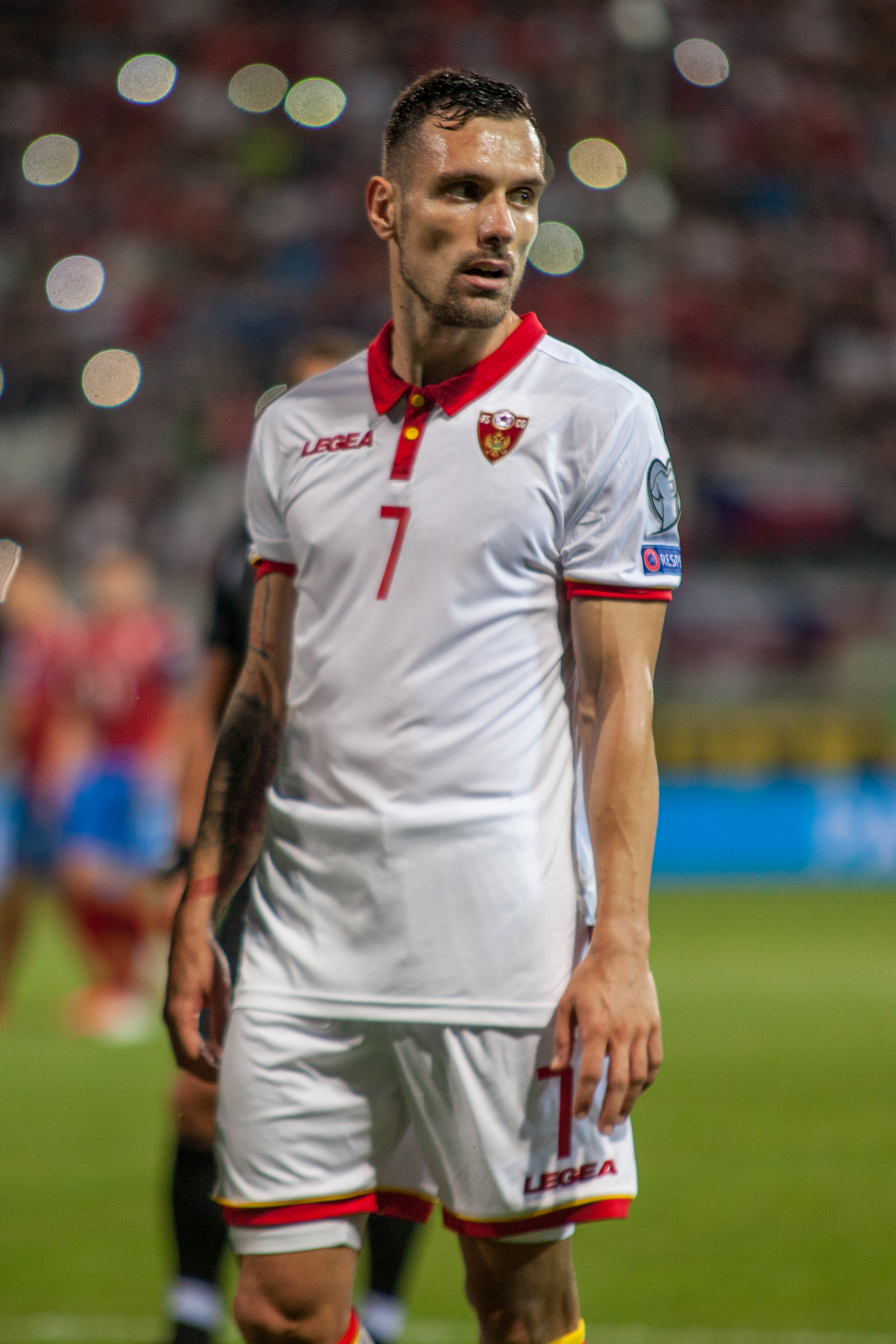
- Vešović with Montenegro in 2019

Personal information
- Date of birth: 28 August 1991 (age 35)
- Place of birth: Titograd, SR Montenegro, Yugoslavia
- Height: 1.77 m (5 ft 9 1/2 in)
- Positions: Wing-back; winger

Team information
- Current team: Lokomotiva
- Number: 23

Youth career
- 2005–2007: FK Mladost Podgorica
- 2007–2009: Budućnost

Senior career*
Years	Team	Apps	(Gls)
2008–2010	Budućnost	11	(1)
2008	→ Mladost Podgorica (loan)	12	(3)
2010–2013	Red Star Belgrade	84	(3)
2014–2015	Torino	3	(0)
2014–2015	→ Rijeka (loan)	17	(1)
2015–2018	Rijeka	67	(10)
2018–2021	Legia Warsaw	62	(2)
2021–2025	Qarabağ	86	(3)
2025–	Lokomotiva	32	(2)

International career^{‡}
2009	Montenegro U19	3	(1)
2010–2012	Montenegro U21	5	(1)
2013–	Montenegro	64	(2)
- * Club domestic league appearances and goals as of 22:33, 12 November 2026 (UTC) ‡ National team caps and goals as of 07:30, 6 October 2026 (UTC)

Marko Vešović (Serbian Cyrillic: Марко Вешовић; born 28 August 1991) is a Montenegrin professional footballer who plays as a right wing-back for Croatian HNL club Lokomotiva and the Montenegro national team.

== Club career ==
=== Early career ===
Born in what is now Podgorica, Montenegro, he spent a portion of his childhood in Lučani, where he played for the youth team of the local club Mladost Lučani. He made his senior debut with Budućnost in the 2008–09 season. He also had a half season loan spell at Mladost Podgorica.

=== Torino ===
On 30 January 2014, he signed with Italian side Torino on a free transfer, after a couple of days on trial under the manager Giampiero Ventura. He made his official debut for the Granata on 9 March 2014 during the trip to Milan against Inter, in which he was a starter, playing the full 90 minutes, lost 1–0. By the end of the 2013–14 season he made four appearances for Torino.

=== Rijeka ===
In summer 2014, he moved to Rijeka in Croatia's Prva HNL on a one-year loan. In the following year, Vešović returned to Rijeka. The transfer was facilitated through Rijeka's Italian partner club, Spezia Calcio in Serie B. On 18 September 2016, he scored a brace in a 5–2 victory for Rijeka over Dinamo Zagreb. Rijeka went on to win the Croatian First Football League in 2017; it was the first season in which Dinamo Zagreb did not finish first since 2005. Vešović was coached by Matjaž Kek during his three years at Rijeka.

=== Legia Warsaw ===
Vešović scored his first goal for Legia Warsaw in a 2–1 win over Lech Poznań on 4 March 2018.

=== Qarabağ ===
On 16 July 2021, he signed with Qarabağ on a free transfer. On 11 June 2025, Vešović's contract with Qarabağ expired and was not renewed.

== International career ==
After having been part of the Montenegrin U-19 team, Vešović was a regular player for Montenegro's U21 team between 2009 and 2013. On 20 May 2013, he was called up to the Montenegro national football team for the first time. After being an unused substitute in several games, he finally made his debut for Montenegro on 15 October 2013, as a substitute in the last match of the 2014 FIFA World Cup qualification against Moldova. On 1 September 2017, Vešović scored his first goal for Montenegro in a 3–0 away win over Kazakhstan as part of the 2018 FIFA World Cup qualification. As of 16 October 2020, he has earned a total of 30 caps, scoring 2 goals.

== Personal life ==
His father Rade Vešović, also a football player and coach, died on 23 August 2019.

== Career statistics ==
=== Club ===
As of 21 May 2018

Appearances and goals by club, season and competition
Club	Season	League			National cup (Note: Includes Serbian Cup, Croatian Cup, Polish Cup)		Europe		Other		Total	
Club	Season	Division	Apps	Goals	Apps	Goals	Apps	Goals	Apps	Goals	Apps	Goals
Red Star	2010–11	Serbian SuperLiga	24	2	3	0	2 (Note: Appearance(s) in UEFA Europa League)	0	—		29	2
Red Star	2011–12	Serbian SuperLiga	23	1	5	0	2	0	—		30	1
Red Star	2012–13	Serbian SuperLiga	25	0	3	0	5	1	—		33	1
Red Star	2013–14	Serbian SuperLiga	12	0	2	0	4	0	—		18	0
Red Star	Total		84	3	13	0	13	1	—		110	4
Torino	2013–14	Serie A	3	0	0	0	1	0	—		4	0
Rijeka	2014–15	Prva HNL	17	1	5	1	5	0	—		27	2
Rijeka	2015–16	Prva HNL	18	2	4	0	0	0	—		22	2
Rijeka	2016–17	Prva HNL	33	6	5	0	2	0	—		40	6
Rijeka	2017–18	Prva HNL	16	2	1	0	12 (Note: Six appearances in UEFA Champions League, six appearances in UEFA Europa League)	0	—		29	2
Rijeka	Total		84	11	15	1	19	0	—		118	12
Legia Warsaw	2017–18	Ekstraklasa	15	1	3	1	0	0	—		18	2
Legia Warsaw	2018–19	Ekstraklasa	25	0	2	0	4 (Note: Appearances in UEFA Champions League)	0	1 (Note: Appearance in Polish Super Cup)	0	32	0
Legia Warsaw	Total		40	1	5	1	4	0	1	0	50	2
Career total			211	15	33	2	37	1	1	0	282	18

=== International ===
As of match played 5 October 2026

Appearances and goals by national team and year
National team	Year	Apps	Goals
Montenegro	2013	2	0
Montenegro	2014	3	0
Montenegro	2015	1	0
Montenegro	2016	5	0
Montenegro	2017	4	1
Montenegro	2018	8	0
Montenegro	2019	7	1
Montenegro	2021	8	0
Montenegro	2022	7	0
Montenegro	2023	5	0
Montenegro	2024	4	0
Montenegro	2025	5	0
Montenegro	2026	5	0
Total		64	2

Scores and results list Montenegro's goal tally first, score column indicates score after each Vešović goal.

List of international goals scored by Marko Vešović
No.	Date	Venue	Opponent	Score	Result	Competition
1	1 September 2017	Astana Arena, Astana, Kazakhstan	Kazakhstan	1–0	3–0	2018 FIFA World Cup qualification
2	25 March 2019	City Stadium, Podgorica, Montenegro	England	1–0	1–5	UEFA Euro 2020 qualification

== Honours ==
Red Star Belgrade

- Serbian Cup: 2011–12

HNK Rijeka

- Croatian First League: 2016–17
- Croatian Cup: 2016–17

Legia Warsaw

- Ekstraklasa: 2017–18, 2019–20, 2020–21
- Polish Cup: 2017–18

Qarabağ

- Azerbaijan Premier League: 2021–22, 2022–23, 2023–24, 2024–25
- Azerbaijan Cup: 2021–22, 2023–24
