= Florentin Matei =

Romanian footballer

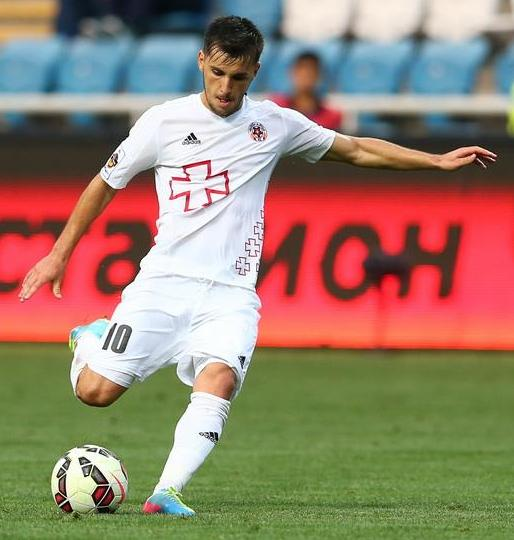
- Matei playing for Volyn Lutsk in 2015

Personal information
- Date of birth: 15 April 1993 (age 33)
- Place of birth: Bolintin-Vale, Romania
- Height: 1.75 m (5 ft 9 in)
- Position: Attacking midfielder

Youth career
- 2005–2011: Steaua București
- 2011–2012: Cesena

Senior career*
Years	Team	Apps	(Gls)
2009–2011	Steaua II București	5	(0)
2010–2011	Steaua București	2	(0)
2010	→ Unirea Urziceni (loan)	5	(0)
2011–2013	Cesena	0	(0)
2013–2016	Volyn Lutsk	54	(10)
2016–2018	Rijeka	39	(4)
2018	→ Astra Giurgiu (loan)	13	(4)
2018	Ittihad Kalba	4	(1)
2019	FCSB	6	(0)
2019	Astra Giurgiu	13	(0)
2020–2021	Apollon Limassol	36	(9)
2021–2022	Apollon Smyrnis	7	(0)
2022	UTA Arad	22	(0)
Total		205	(28)

International career^{‡}
2010	Romania U17	2	(0)
2011	Romania U19	3	(0)
- * Club domestic league appearances and goals as of 29 December 2022 ‡ National team caps and goals as of 11 October 2011

Florentin Matei (Romanian pronunciation: [florenˈtin maˈtej]; born 15 April 1993) is a Romanian professional footballer who plays as an attacking midfielder.

He began his football career at Steaua București, before leaving his native country in 2011 to play for Cesena. He then had spells with Volyn Lutsk and Rijeka, winning two domestic trophies in Croatia with the latter. At the beginning of 2018, Matei returned to Romania on loan with Astra Giurgiu, but then joined Ittihad Kalba in the summer of the same year. After being released by the Emirati side in January 2019, he was resigned by his boyhood club FCSB.

Matei represented Romania at under-17 and under-19 level.

== Club career ==
=== Steaua București ===
Born in Bolintin-Vale, Giurgiu County, Matei came through FC Steaua București's youth ranks, and in 2009 he was named the best player of the "Iulian Manzarov – International Football Tournament for Juniors" in Bulgaria. On 16 May 2010 he made his Liga I debut for the senior team, in a 2–0 victory against FC Universitatea Craiova where he came on as a substitute for Romeo Surdu in the 82nd minute; in September, he was sent on loan at fellow league side Unirea Urziceni along with several other teammates from Steaua's reserves.

The following year, Matei terminated his contract with the capital-based club. As a result, Steaua owner George Becali criticised the youngster, stating in a controversial manner that he would never become an above average player.

=== Cesena ===
After eight months as a free agent, Matei signed with A.C. Cesena from Italy on 11 September 2011. He was released only a year later.

=== Volyn Lutsk ===
In the autumn of 2013, Matei agreed to a three-year deal with Ukrainian side Volyn Lutsk, having been previously close to joining Dinamo București, the historical rival of his former club Steaua. During his spell with "the Crusaders" he made 61 appearances all competitions comprised, and scored 12 goals.

=== Rijeka ===
On 2 February 2016, HNK Rijeka announced they had signed Matei on a three-and-a-half-year contract. He was given the number 10 jersey and made his debut a week later, as an 85th-minute substitute in a 2–0 home win over NK Lokomotiva. He scored his first goal for his new team in the first leg of the Croatian Cup semi-final, helping to a 2–1 defeat of Slaven Belupo.

On 9 January 2018, Rijeka loaned Matei to Astra Giurgiu in Romania until the end of the campaign.

=== Ittihad Kalba ===
In May 2018, after his loan at Astra Giurgiu expired, he moved to Emirati club Ittihad Kalba for a transfer fee of €500,000. He netted his first goal on 28 September, in a 3–1 victory over Al-Nasr.

=== Return to FCSB ===
Matei returned to his boyhood club Steaua București—now renamed FCSB—on 4 January 2019, seven years after stating that he did not regret leaving the Roș-albaștrii and being subsequently criticised by owner Gigi Becali.

=== Return to Astra Giurgiu ===
On 19 June 2019 he signed a 1-year contract with Liga I side Astra Giurgiu.

=== Apollon Smyrnis ===
On 19 February 2022, Matei's contract with Greek club Apollon Smyrnis was terminated.

== International career ==
Matei earned caps for Romania's under-17 and under-19 teams. In early 2016, Romanian coach Mircea Lucescu regarded him as a player who would deserve to be selected for the full side.

== Career statistics ==
=== Club ===
As of 8 December 2022

Appearances and goals by club, season and competition
Club	Season	League			Cup		Continental		Other		Total	
Club	Season	Division	Apps	Goals	Apps	Goals	Apps	Goals	Apps	Goals	Apps	Goals
Steaua București II	2009–10	Liga II	3	0	–		–		–		3	0
Steaua București II	2010–11	Liga II	2	0	–		–		–		2	0
Steaua București II	Total		5	0	0	0	!0	0	!0	0	!5	0
FCSB	2009–10	Liga I	2	0	–		–		–		2	0
FCSB	2018–19	Liga I	6	0	–		–		–		6	0
FCSB	Total		8	0	0	0	!0	0	!0	0	!8	0
Unirea Urziceni (loan)	2010–11	Liga I	5	0	2	0	–		–		7	0
Volyn Lutsk	2013–14	Ukrainian Premier League	18	2	1	0	–		–		19	2
Volyn Lutsk	2014–15	Ukrainian Premier League	20	2	3	0	–		–		23	2
Volyn Lutsk	2015–16	Ukrainian Premier League	15	6	3	2	–		–		18	8
Volyn Lutsk	Total		53	10	7	2	0	0	0	0	60	12
Rijeka	2015–16	Croatian First League	13	1	2	1	–		–		15	2
Rijeka	2016–17	Croatian First League	18	2	3	0	2	0	–		23	2
Rijeka	2017–18	Croatian First League	8	1	1	0	5	2	–		14	3
Rijeka	Total		39	4	6	1	7	2	0	0	52	7
Astra Giurgiu	2017–18	Liga I	13	4	1	0	–		–		14	4
Astra Giurgiu	2019–20	Liga I	13	0	2	0	–		–		29	0
Astra Giurgiu	Total		26	4	3	0	0	0	0	0	21	4
Ittihad Kalba	2018–19	UAE Pro-League	4	1	2	0	–		–		6	1
Apollon Limassol	2019–20	Cypriot First Division	8	2	2	1	–		–		10	3
Apollon Limassol	2020–21	Cypriot First Division	28	7	1	0	2	0	–		31	7
Apollon Limassol	Total		36	9	3	1	2	0	0	0	41	10
Apollon Smyrnis	2021–22	Super League Greece	7	0	1	0	–		–		8	0
UTA Arad	2021–22	Liga I	10	0	–		–		–		10	0
UTA Arad	2022–23	Liga I	12	0	2	0	–		–		14	0
UTA Arad	Total		22	0	2	0	0	0	0	0	24	0
Career total			205	28	26	4	9	2	0	0	240	34

== Honours ==
=== Club ===
Rijeka

- Prva HNL: 2016–17
- Croatian Cup: 2016–17
