= Leonard Zuta =

Macedonian footballer

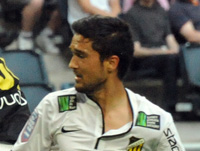

Personal information
- Full name: Leonard Zuta
- Date of birth: 9 August 1992 (age 34)
- Place of birth: Gothenburg, Sweden
- Height: 1.80 m (5 ft 11 in)
- Position: Left back

Team information
- Current team: NK Slaven Belupo
- Number: 44

Youth career
- 2005–2009: Västra Frölunda
- 2010–2012: Häcken

Senior career*
Years	Team	Apps	(Gls)
2012–2015	Häcken	57	(0)
2015–2018	Rijeka	109	(2)
2019–2020	Konyaspor	12	(0)
2020	Häcken	16	(1)
2020–2021	Lecce	23	(0)
2021–2023	Vålerenga	53	(3)
2023–2024	IF Brommapojkarna	10	(0)
2024–2025	HNK Šibenik	28	(1)
2025-	Slaven Belupo	19	(2)

International career^{‡}
2012–2013	Macedonia U21	3	(0)
2015–2018	Macedonia	15	(0)
- * Club domestic league appearances and goals as of 15 June 2026 ‡ National team caps and goals as of 04 October 2021

Leonard Zuta (Macedonian: Леонард Жута; born 9 August 1992) is a Macedonian professional footballer who plays as a left back for NK Slaven Belupo.

== Club career ==
Zuta spent the first four seasons of his professional career with BK Häcken in Allsvenskan. He made his official début on 13 April 2012, when he came in as a substitute in a home win against Mjällby AIF. Until late August 2015, Zuta made 57 appearances with Häcken, often featuring in the starting line-up.

On 31 August 2015, Zuta signed a three-year contract with Rijeka in Croatia's 1. HNL. He made his official début for the club on 19 September 2015, in a goalless home draw against Inter Zaprešić, when he entered as a substitute in the 87th minute. Zuta soon became a first team player during his stint at the club and won Croatian league and cup in 2016–17 season. Zuta also became popular figure to the supporters of Rijeka and was praised on various memes on social media.

On 8 January 2019 Zuta signed for Turkish Süper Lig club Konyaspor.

In September 2020, Zuta signed a two-year contract with Italian Serie B club Lecce, with an option for another year.

On 30 July 2021, Zuta signed a three-year contract with Norwegian Eliteserien club Vålerenga. He was brought in to replace Sam Adekugbe, who had left for Hatayspor.

On 30 August 2023, Zuta signed with IF Brommapojkarna, on a contract until the end of 2025.

== International career ==
On 15 June 2015. Zhuta made his début with the Macedonian national team in an away loss to Slovakia. He has earned a total of 15 caps, scoring no goals and his final international was a November 2016 FIFA World Cup qualification match against Spain.

== Club statistics ==
Season	Club	League	League		Cup		Continental		Total	
Season	Club	League	Apps	Goals	Apps	Goals	Apps	Goals	Apps	Goals
2012	Häcken	Allsvenskan	1	0	2	0	–		3	0
2013	Häcken	Allsvenskan	16	0	5	0	1	0	22	0
2014	Häcken	Allsvenskan	19	0	6	0	–		25	0
2015	Häcken	Allsvenskan	21	0	1	0	–		22	0
Häcken total			57	0	14	0	1	0	72	0
2015–16	Rijeka	1. HNL	26	0	4	0	–		30	0
2016–17	Rijeka	1. HNL	35	0	6	0	2	0	43	0
2017–18	Rijeka	1. HNL	35	2	4	0	10	0	49	2
2018–19	Rijeka	1. HNL	13	0	2	0	2	0	17	0
Rijeka total			109	2	16	0	14	0	139	2
Career total			166	2	30	0	15	0	211	2
Last Update: 8 December 2018.

== International statistics ==
As of 12 November 2016

National team	Year	Apps	Goals
Macedonia	2015	7	0
Macedonia	2016	8	0
Total		15	0

== Honours ==
HNK Rijeka

- Croatian First Football League: 2016–17
- Croatian Football Cup: 2016–17
