= Stefan Ristovski =

Macedonian footballer (born 1992)

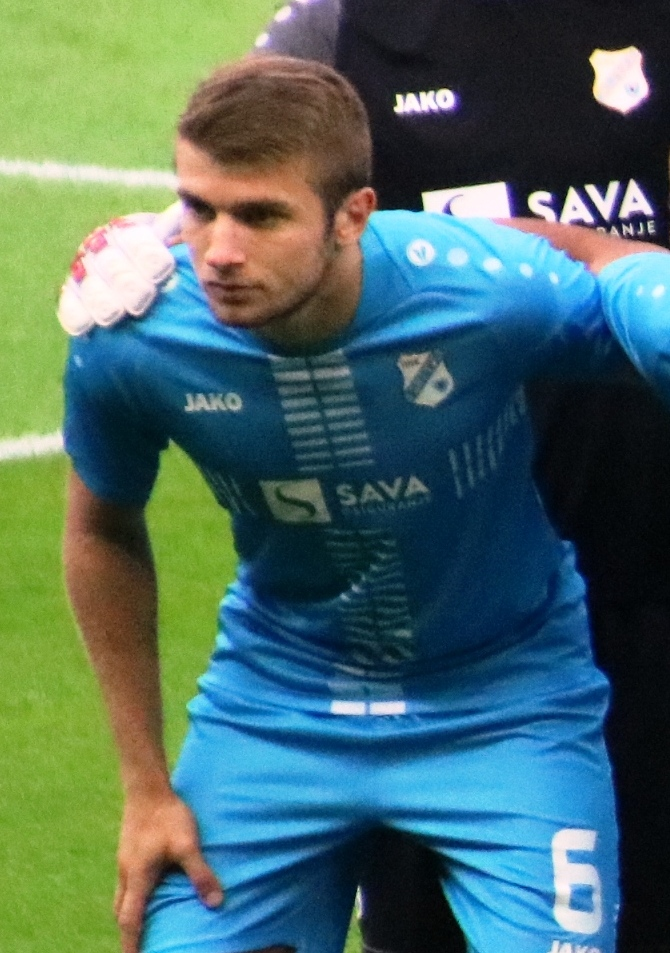
- Ristovski with Rijeka in 2017

Personal information
- Date of birth: 12 February 1992 (age 34)
- Place of birth: Skopje, Macedonia
- Height: 1.83 m (6 ft 0 in)
- Position: Right-back

Youth career
- Vardar

Senior career*
Years	Team	Apps	(Gls)
2008–2010	Vardar	17	(1)
2010–2015	Parma	6	(0)
2011–2012	→ Crotone (loan)	1	(0)
2012	→ Frosinone (loan)	12	(0)
2012–2013	→ Bari (loan)	20	(0)
2013–2014	→ Latina (loan)	37	(3)
2015	→ Latina (loan)	19	(0)
2015–2017	Rijeka	68	(0)
2017–2021	Sporting CP	52	(0)
2021–2025	Dinamo Zagreb	120	(7)
2025–2026	Sarajevo	28	(3)

International career
2008–2009	Macedonia U19	6	(0)
2009–2014	Macedonia U21	20	(1)
2011–2023	North Macedonia	82	(2)
- * Club domestic league appearances and goals as of 25 May 2026

Stefan Ristovski (Macedonian: Стефан Ристовски; born 12 February 1992) is a Macedonian footballer who plays as a right-back.

== Club career ==
Born in Skopje, Ristovski began his career at hometown club Vardar before he signed a five-year deal with Italian club Parma in January 2010. He was 17 at the time but the deal could not become official until he turned 18.

Ristovski joined Serie B club Crotone on loan on 6 July 2011. After not receiving much playing time, the loan was cancelled in the January 2012 and he was then loaned to Frosinone for the remainder of the campaign. On 5 July 2012, he was again sent on loan, to Serie B side Bari. He was then loaned out to Latina in the same division for the 2013–14 season, returning to them for a second time in January 2015. Before the bankruptcy of Parma, Ristovski was under contract with Parma until 30 June 2019.

In July 2015, Ristovski moved to Rijeka in Croatia. The transfer was facilitated through Rijeka's Italian partner club, Spezia. In order for Ristovski to remain eligible under Italy's non-EU quota, he was signed by Spezia on a free transfer and then loaned to Rijeka. On 7 August 2017, Ristovski signed with Sporting. On 2 February 2021, he signed for GNK Dinamo Zagreb. He made his debut for Dinamo on 13 February in a derby against Osijek. In his debut, he received two yellow cards and was sent off.

== International career ==
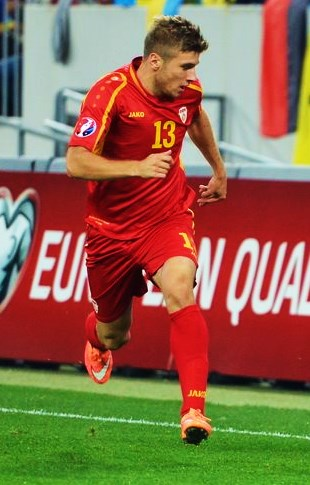
Risovski in 2014 with Macedonia

Ristovski made his debut for Macedonia on 10 August 2011 in an away friendly against Azerbaijan and has, as of April 2020, earned a total of 52 caps, scoring 1 goal. He represented the nation at UEFA Euro 2020, their first major tournament. In August 2023, while captain of the national team (a title inherited from Goran Pandev), Ristovski feuded with head coach Blagoja Milevski over team philosophy and cohesion. He released a public statement on social media announcing his withdrawal from the national team. The announcement came within a month of two national team Euro 2024 qualifiers. The impasse was spawned after the previous head coach Igor Angelovski announced that his contract would not be renewed as he himself had problems with the new administration team of FFM in 2021 despite the team's qualification for its first major tournament. Ristevski subsequently returned for two friendlies the following year.

== Personal life ==
His younger brother Milan is also a professional footballer and North Macedonia international.

Ristovski also has Portuguese citizenship, and his son was born in Portugal.

== Career statistics ==
=== Club ===
As of match played 16 July 2026

Club	Season	League			National cup (Note: Includes Coppa Italia, Croatian Cup, Taça de Portugal, Bosnian Cup)		League cup (Note: Includes Taça da Liga)		Continental		Other		Total	
Club	Season	Division	Apps	Goals	Apps	Goals	Apps	Goals	Apps	Goals	Apps	Goals	Apps	Goals
Vardar	2008–09	1. MFL	6	0	—		—		—		—		6	0
Vardar	2009–10	1. MFL	11	1	—		—		—		—		11	1
Vardar	Total		17	1	—		—		—		—		17	1
Crotone (loan)	2011–12	Serie B	1	0	1	0	—		—		—		2	0
Frosinone (loan)	2011–12	Lega Pro	12	0	—		—		—		—		12	0
Bari (loan)	2012–13	Serie B	20	0	1	0	—		—		—		21	0
Latina (loan)	2013–14	Serie B	37	3	1	0	—		—		—		38	3
Parma	2014–15	Serie A	6	0	—		—		—		—		6	0
Latina (loan)	2014–15	Serie B	19	0	—		—		—		—		19	0
Rijeka	2015–16	Prva HNL	32	0	5	0	—		1 (Note: Appearance(s) in UEFA Europa League)	0	—		38	0
Rijeka	2016–17	Prva HNL	33	0	6	1	—		2	0	—		41	1
Rijeka	2017–18	Prva HNL	3	0	—		—		4 (Note: Appearances in UEFA Champions League)	1	—		7	1
Rijeka	Total		68	0	11	1	—		7	1	—		86	2
Sporting (loan)	2017–18	Primeira Liga	8	0	7	0	1	0	7 (Note: Four appearances in UEFA Champions League; three appearances in UEFA Europa League)	0	—		23	0
Sporting	2018–19	Primeira Liga	23	0	2	0	3	0	5	0	—		33	0
Sporting	2019–20	Primeira Liga	21	0	0	0	3	0	2	0	—		26	0
Sporting	Total		52	0	9	0	7	0	14	0	—		82	0
Dinamo Zagreb	2020–21	Prva HNL	8	0	2	0	—		6	0	—		16	0
Dinamo Zagreb	2021–22	Prva HNL	30	1	2	0	—		13 (Note: Six appearances in UEFA Champions League; seven appearances in UEFA Europa League)	0	—		45	1
Dinamo Zagreb	2022–23	Prva HNL	28	4	2	0	—		11	0	—		41	4
Dinamo Zagreb	2023–24	Prva HNL	26	0	3	0	—		14 (Note: Four appearance in UEFA Champions League; two appearances in UEFA Europa League; eight appearances in UEFA Conference League)	0	1 (Note: Appearance in Croatian Super Cup)	0	44	0
Dinamo Zagreb	2024–25	Prva HNL	28	2	2	0	—		9	0	—		39	2
Dinamo Zagreb	Total		120	7	11	0	—		53	0	1	0	185	7
Sarajevo	2025–26	Bosnian Premier League	28	3	3	0	—		2 (Note: Appearances in UEFA Conference League)	0	1 (Note: Appearance in Bosnian Supercup)	0	34	3
Sarajevo	2026–27	Bosnian Premier League	0	0	0	0	—		2	0	—		2	0
Sarajevo	Total		28	3	3	0	—		4	0	1	0	36	3
Career total			380	14	37	1	7	0	78	1	2	0	504	16

=== International ===
As of 29 March 2022

National team	Year	Apps	Goals
Macedonia	2011	1	0
Macedonia	2012	3	0
Macedonia	2013	7	0
Macedonia	2014	4	0
Macedonia	2015	6	0
Macedonia	2016	8	0
Macedonia	2017	9	1
Macedonia	2018	6	0
North; Macedonia	2019	8	0
North; Macedonia	2020	8	1
North; Macedonia	2021	14	0
North; Macedonia	2022	2	0
Total		76	2

As of match played 8 September 2020. North Macedonia score listed first, score column indicates score after each Ristovski goal.

International goals by date, venue, cap, opponent, score, result and competition
No.	Date	Venue	Cap	Opponent	Score	Result	Competition
1	11 June 2017	Philip II Arena, Skopje, Macedonia	33	Spain	1–2	1–2	2018 FIFA World Cup qualification
2	8 September 2020	Boris Paichadze Dinamo Arena, Tbilisi, Georgia	54	Georgia	1–1	1–1	2020–21 UEFA Nations League C

== Honours ==
=== Club ===
Rijeka

- Prva HNL: 2016–17
- Croatian Cup: 2016–17

Sporting CP

- Taça de Portugal: 2018–19
- Taça da Liga: 2017–18, 2018–19

Dinamo Zagreb

- Prva HNL: 2020–21, 2021–22, 2022–23, 2023–24
- Croatian Cup: 2020–21 ,2023-24

=== Individual ===
- Croatian First Football League Team of the Year: 2015–16, 2016–17, 2021–22, 2022–23, 2023–24
