= Aleksandar Šofranac =

Montenegrin footballer

Personal information
- Date of birth: 21 October 1990 (age 36)
- Place of birth: Cetinje, SR Montenegro, SFR Yugoslavia
- Height: 1.86 m (6 ft 1 in)
- Position: Centre-back

Team information
- Current team: Otrant-Olympic
- Number: 5

Senior career*
Years	Team	Apps	(Gls)
2008–2013	Mladost Podgorica	88	(2)
2013–2014	Javor Ivanjica	7	(0)
2015–2016	Sutjeska Nikšić	36	(0)
2016–2017	Rijeka	7	(0)
2017–2018	Cercle Brugge	3	(0)
2018–2019	Sarajevo	13	(0)
2019–2021	Sutjeska Nikšić	53	(0)
2021–2022	Dinamo Tirana	24	(1)
2022–2023	Dečić	7	(0)
2023	Mladost DG	17	(0)
2024–2025	Rudar Pljevlja	29	(2)
2025–	Otrant-Olympic	28	(2)

International career^{‡}
2011	Montenegro U21	3	(0)
2016–	Montenegro	8	(0)
- * Club domestic league appearances and goals as of 18 June 2026 ‡ National team caps and goals as of 19 April 2023

Aleksandar Šofranac (Serbian Cyrillic: Александар Шофранац; born 21 October 1990) is a Montenegrin professional footballer who plays as a centre back for Otrant-Olympic and the Montenegro national team.

== International career ==
Šofranac made his debut for Montenegro in a March 2016 friendly match against Belarus and has, as of 16 October 2020, earned a total of 6 caps, scoring no goals.

== Career statistics ==
As of match played 25 May 2019

Appearances and goals by club, season and competition
Club	Season	League			National Cup		Other		Total	
Club	Season	Division	Apps	Goals	Apps	Goals	Apps	Goals	Apps	Goals
Mladost Podgorica	2010–11	Montenegrin First League	32	2	0	0	—		32	2
Mladost Podgorica	2011–12	Montenegrin First League	21	0	2	0	—		23	0
Mladost Podgorica	2012–13	Montenegrin First League	27	0	4	0	—		31	0
Mladost Podgorica	2013–14	Montenegrin First League	8	0	2	0	6 (Note: Appearances in the Europa League)	0	16	0
Mladost Podgorica	Total		88	2	8	0	6	0	102	2
Javor Ivanjica	2013–14	Serbian SuperLiga	7	0	1	0	—		8	0
Sutjeska Nikšić	2014–15	Montenegrin First League	8	0	2	0	0	0	10	0
Sutjeska Nikšić	2015–16	Montenegrin First League	28	0	0	0	2	0	30	0
Sutjeska Nikšić	Total		36	0	2	0	2	0	40	0
Rijeka	2016–17	Prva HNL	7	0	3	1	0	0	10	1
Cercle Brugge	2017–18	First Division B	3	0	1	0	—		4	0
Sarajevo	2017–18	Bosnian Premier League	6	0	—		—		6	0
Sarajevo	2018–19	Bosnian Premier League	7	0	2	1	0	0	9	1
Sarajevo	Total		13	0	2	1	0	0	15	1
Sutjeska Nikšić	2019–20	Montenegrin First League	0	0	0	0	0	0	0	0
Career total			154	2	17	2	8	0	179	4

== Honours ==
=== Club ===
Rijeka

- 1. HNL: 2016–17
- Croatian Cup: 2016–17

Sarajevo

- Bosnian Premier League: 2018–19
- Bosnian Cup: 2018–19
