= Alexander Gorgon =

Austrian-Polish footballer

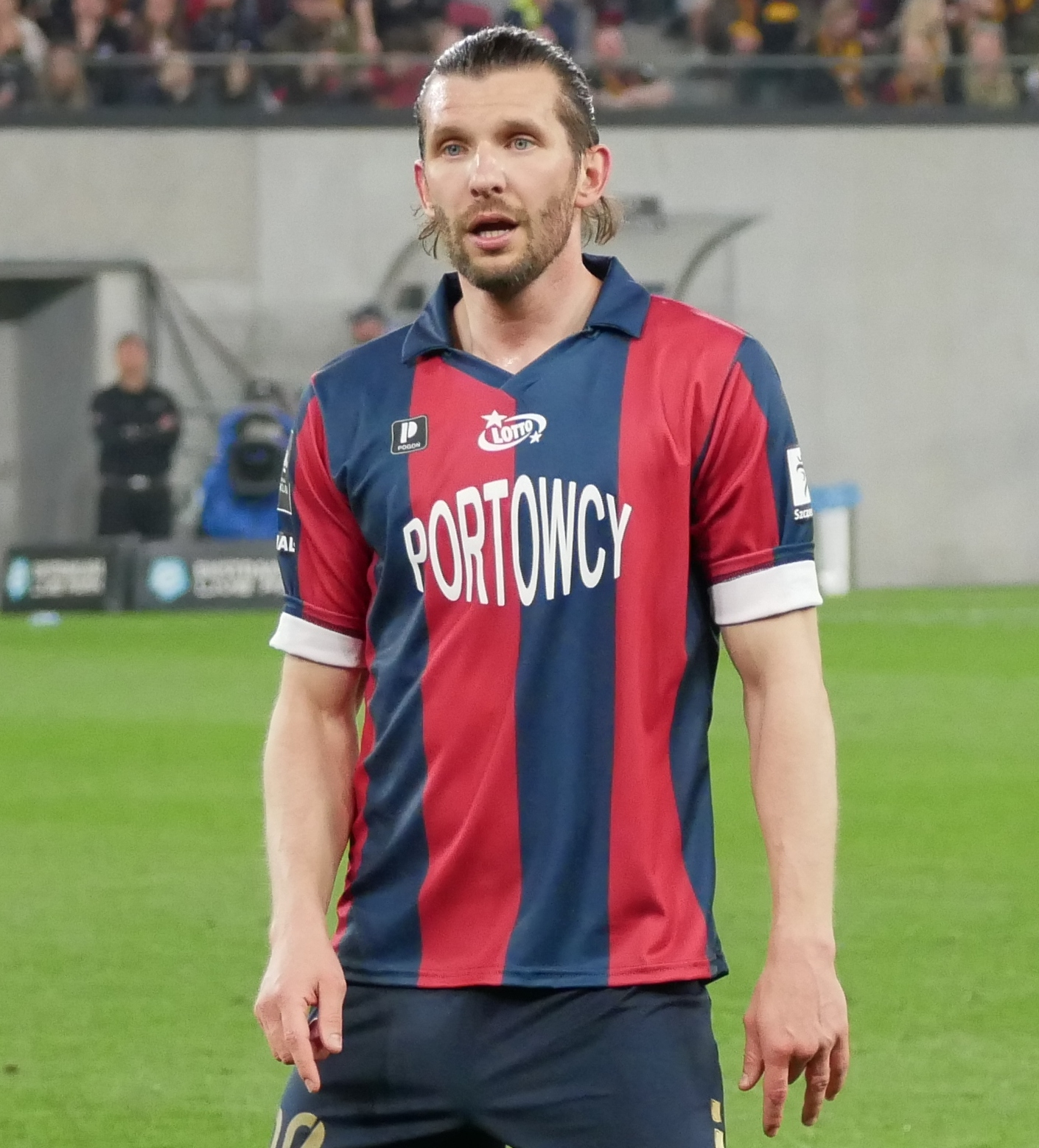
- Gorgon with Pogoń Szczecin in 2023

Personal information
- Date of birth: 28 October 1988 (age 38)
- Place of birth: Vienna, Austria
- Height: 1.85 m (6 ft 1 in)
- Position: Attacking midfielder

Team information
- Current team: Świt Szczecin
- Number: 7

Senior career*
Years	Team	Apps	(Gls)
2009–2014	Austria Wien II	36	(8)
2011–2016	Austria Wien	135	(47)
2016–2020	Rijeka	100	(34)
2020–2025	Pogoń Szczecin	92	(20)
2022–2023	Pogoń Szczecin II	4	(0)
2025–2026	Rheindorf Altach	31	(1)
2026–	Świt Szczecin	0	(0)

International career
2007	Austria U20	1	(0)
- * Club domestic league appearances and goals as of 10 June 2026

Alexander Gorgon (Polish: Aleksander Gorgoń; born 28 October 1988) is an Austrian-Polish professional footballer who plays as an attacking midfielder for II liga club Świt Szczecin.

== Career statistics ==
As of match played 16 May 2026

Appearances and goals by club, season and competition
Club	Season	League			National cup (Note: Includes Austrian Cup, Croatian Cup, Polish Cup)		Continental		Total	
Club	Season	Division	Apps	Goals	Apps	Goals	Apps	Goals	Apps	Goals
Austria Wien	2010–11	Austrian Bundesliga	3	0	2	0	—		5	0
Austria Wien	2011–12	Austrian Bundesliga	31	6	2	0	9 (Note: Appearance(s) in UEFA Europa League)	1	42	7
Austria Wien	2012–13	Austrian Bundesliga	31	10	5	1	—		36	11
Austria Wien	2013–14	Austrian Bundesliga	14	4	1	0	0	0	15	4
Austria Wien	2014–15	Austrian Bundesliga	21	8	4	1	—		25	9
Austria Wien	2015–16	Austrian Bundesliga	35	19	5	2	—		40	21
Austria Wien	Total		135	47	19	4	9	1	163	52
HNK Rijeka	2016–17	Prva HNL	25	12	6	3	—		31	15
HNK Rijeka	2017–18	Prva HNL	23	7	2	0	10 (Note: Six appearances and one goal in UEFA Champions League, four appearances and two goals in UEFA Europa League)	3	35	10
HNK Rijeka	2018–19	Prva HNL	26	8	3	1	2	1	31	10
HNK Rijeka	2019–20	Prva HNL	26	7	3	1	1	0	30	8
HNK Rijeka	Total		100	34	14	5	13	4	127	43
Pogoń Szczecin	2020–21	Ekstraklasa	24	5	3	1	—		27	6
Pogoń Szczecin	2021–22	Ekstraklasa	1	0	0	0	2 (Note: Appearances in UEFA Europa Conference League)	0	3	0
Pogoń Szczecin	2022–23	Ekstraklasa	17	3	0	0	0	0	17	3
Pogoń Szczecin	2023–24	Ekstraklasa	32	8	5	0	4	0	41	8
Pogoń Szczecin	2024–25	Ekstraklasa	18	4	3	1	—		21	5
Pogoń Szczecin	Total		92	20	11	2	6	0	109	22
Pogoń Szczecin II	2022–23	III liga, gr. II	4	0	0	0	—		4	0
Rheindorf Altach	2024–25	Austrian Bundesliga	15	0	—		—		15	0
Rheindorf Altach	2025–26	Austrian Bundesliga	16	1	4	0	—		20	1
Rheindorf Altach	Total		31	1	4	0	—		35	1
Świt Szczecin	2026–27	II liga	0	0	0	0	—		0	0
Career total			362	102	48	11	28	5	438	118

== Honours ==
Austria Wien

- Austrian Bundesliga: 2012–13

Rijeka

- Croatian First Football League: 2016–17
- Croatian Cup: 2016–17, 2018–19, 2019–20
