= Dario Čanađija =

Croatian footballer

Personal information
- Full name: Dario Čanađija
- Date of birth: 17 April 1994 (age 32)
- Place of birth: Bjelovar, Croatia
- Height: 1.76 m (5 ft 9 in)
- Position: Midfielder

Team information
- Current team: Ordabasy
- Number: 27

Youth career
- 2001–2006: Mladost Ždralovi
- 2006–2008: Bjelovar
- 2008–2009: Varteks
- 2009–2011: Slaven Belupo

Senior career*
Years	Team	Apps	(Gls)
2011–2014	Slaven Belupo	62	(5)
2014–2019	Rijeka	41	(0)
2014–2016	→ Spezia (loan)	33	(2)
2017–2018	→ Olimpija Ljubljana (loan)	31	(3)
2019	Slaven Belupo	14	(1)
2019–2020	Gorica	29	(1)
2020–2021	Astra Giurgiu	30	(1)
2021	Sarpsborg 08	12	(1)
2022	Aalesunds FK	21	(1)
2023	Šibenik	18	(0)
2023–2024	Zrinjski Mostar	17	(0)
2024	A.E. Kifisia	12	(0)
2024–2025	Gloria Buzău	15	(1)
2025–	Ordabasy	17	(1)

International career
2011–2013	Croatia U19	14	(0)
2013	Croatia U20	5	(0)
2014–2015	Croatia U21	2	(2)
- * Club domestic league appearances and goals as of 2 November 2025

Dario Čanađija (born 17 April 1994) is a Croatian professional footballer who plays as a midfielder for Kazakhstani club Ordabasy.

== Honours ==
Rijeka

- Prva HNL: 2016–17
- Croatian Cup: 2016–17

Olimpija Ljubljana

- Slovenian PrvaLiga: 2017–18
- Slovenian Cup: 2017–18

Astra Giurgiu

- Cupa României runner-up: 2020–21

Šibenik

- Croatian Cup runner-up: 2022–23
