= Goodness Ajayi =

Nigerian football player

Personal information
- Full name: Goodness Ohiremen Ajayi
- Date of birth: October 6, 1994 (age 32)
- Place of birth: Benin City, Nigeria
- Height: 1.79 m (5 ft 10 1/2 in)
- Position: Forward

Team information
- Current team: Jarun

Youth career
- 2012: Abuja Football College Academy
- 2012–2013: Rijeka

Senior career*
Years	Team	Apps	(Gls)
2013–2018	Rijeka	29	(2)
2014–2015	→ Rijeka II	14	(3)
2015–2016	→ Široki Brijeg (loan)	15	(5)
2017–2018	→ Hapoel Ashkelon (loan)	10	(2)
2018–2019	Inter Zaprešić	16	(2)
2019–2020	Astra Giurgiu	3	(0)
2021	Kazma		
2021	Quriyat Club		
2022	Rudeš	0	(0)
2022–2026	Opatija	106	(34)
2026–	Jarun		
- * Club domestic league appearances and goals as of 11 July 2026

Goodness Ohiremen Ajayi (born 6 October 1994) is a Nigerian professional footballer who plays as a forward for the Croatian club NK Jarun Zagreb.

== Career ==
Born in Benin City, Ajayi was one of several players who moved from the Nigerian Abuja Football College Academy to the Rijeka youth team in late 2012, impressing enough to stay at the club. He made his Rijeka debut in the first round of the 2013–14 season at the age of 18, becoming the first player from Abuja Academy, run by Gabriele Volpi, the owner of Rijeka and Spezia Calcio, to feature in the club's squad.

While at Rijeka, Ajayi was loaned to Bosnian Premier League club Široki Brijeg in July 2015 and to Israeli Premier League club Hapoel Ashkelon in August 2017. In June 2018, he was transferred to Inter Zaprešić as part of a player-exchange deal. On 19 June 2019, he signed a contract with Romanian Liga I club Astra Giurgiu.

== Honours ==
Rijeka

- 1. HNL: 2016–17
- Croatian Cup: 2013–14, 2016–17
- Croatian Super Cup: 2014
