= Aliyu Okechukwu =

Nigerian footballer

Mohammed Okechukwu Aliyu
Personal information
- Date of birth: September 5, 1995 (age 31)
- Place of birth: Umuna, Nigeria
- Height: 1.78 m (5 ft 10 in)
- Position: Attacking midfielder

Team information
- Current team: Primorac Biograd
- Number: 19

Youth career
- –2013: Abuja Football College Academy

Senior career*
Years	Team	Apps	(Gls)
2013–2016	Rijeka	0	(0)
2014	→ Pomorac (loan)	8	(0)
2014	→ Rijeka II	14	(2)
2015	→ Zadar (loan)	9	(0)
2015–2016	→ Šibenik (loan)	17	(3)
2016–2017	RNK Split	7	(0)
2017	Istra 1961	2	(0)
2017–2019	Šibenik	33	(3)
2019–2020	Rudeš	2	(0)
2020–2021	Primorac Biograd	30	(5)
2021–2022	Zagorec Krapina	17	(3)
2022–	Primorac Biograd	54	(7)
- * Club domestic league appearances and goals as of 19 June 2024

Aliyu Okechukwu (born September 5, 1995) is a Nigerian footballer who plays as an attacking midfielder for Primorac Biograd in Croatia.

== Club career ==
=== Rijeka ===
Okechukwu was one of several players who moved from the Nigerian Abuja Football College Academy to the HNK Rijeka Academy in 2013. Following his arrival to Rijeka, in mid-2013, he picked up the most valuable player award at the 61st international Kvarnerska Rivijera tournament. In September 2013, Okechukwu signed a 2 1/2-year contract with HNK Rijeka that ties him with the club until June 2016. During the same month, his leg was fractured during a youth tournament match in Ljubljana.

==== Pomorac (loan) ====
Following his recovery from injury, in early 2014, he was loaned to NK Pomorac in 2. HNL together with his compatriot Theophilus Solomon. He made his professional début in a home draw against NK Solin on April 2, 2014. At Pomorac, he made eight appearances without finding the net.

==== Rijeka II ====
Following his return from loan in mid-2014, Okechukwu played for Rijeka II in 3. HNL, scoring two goals in 14 appearances.

==== Zadar (loan) ====
In January 2015, Okechukwu was loaned to Zadar until the end of the 2014–15 1. HNL season, where he once again joined Solomon. He made 9 appearances with the club before the end of his loan.

==== Šibenik (loan) ====
Following their spell with Zadar, in July 2015, Okechukwu and Solomon, joined by another Nigerian David Nwolokor, were sent on a season-long loan to HNK Šibenik in 2. HNL. Okechukwu was a regular starter in the first half of the season. However, he sustained an injury during mid-season training and consequently missed the second half of the season.

=== RNK Split ===
In June 2016, Okechukwu was transferred to RNK Split.

=== Istra 1961 ===
Following a season with RNK Split, in July 2017, Okechukwu moved to NK Istra 1961.
