= Roman Bezjak =

Slovenian footballer (born 1989)

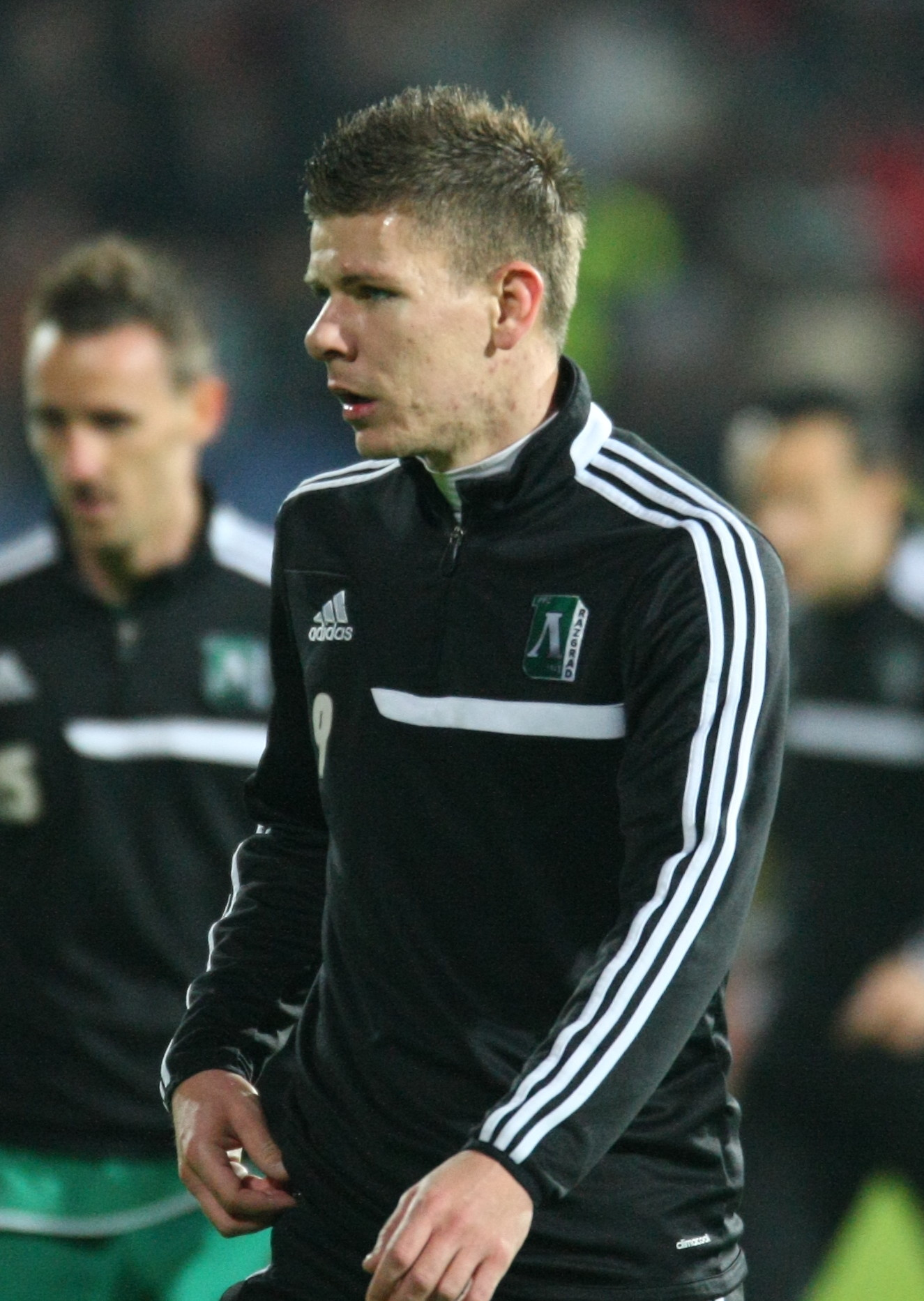

Personal information
- Date of birth: 21 February 1989 (age 37)
- Place of birth: Slovenj Gradec, SR Slovenia, Yugoslavia
- Height: 1.79 m (5 ft 10 in)
- Position: Forward

Team information
- Current team: SV Straß

Youth career
- Korotan Prevalje
- –2005: Dravograd
- 2005–2008: Celje

Senior career*
Years	Team	Apps	(Gls)
2008–2012	Celje	108	(34)
2008	→ Zagorje (loan)	5	(3)
2009–2010	→ Mladi upi Šentjur (loan)	8	(4)
2012–2015	Ludogorets Razgrad	60	(20)
2015–2016	Rijeka	39	(20)
2016–2018	Darmstadt 98	14	(0)
2017	→ Rijeka (loan)	16	(4)
2018–2019	Jagiellonia Białystok	30	(7)
2019–2020	APOEL	18	(4)
2020	Olimpija Ljubljana	16	(2)
2020–2021	Celje	10	(0)
2021–2022	Balıkesirspor	25	(1)
2022–2026	USV Wies	87	(44)
2026–	SV Straß	0	(0)

International career
2007	Slovenia U18	8	(3)
2007	Slovenia U19	6	(3)
2009–2010	Slovenia U20	2	(0)
2008–2010	Slovenia U21	2	(0)
2013–2019	Slovenia	33	(5)
- * Club domestic league appearances and goals as of 7 July 2026

Roman Bezjak (born 21 February 1989) is a Slovenian footballer who plays as a forward for Austrian club SV Straß. He made his debut for the Slovenia national team in 2013, making a total of 33 appearances and scoring 5 goals.

== Club career ==
=== Celje ===
Bezjak made his debut for Celje on 9 April 2008 against Maribor, coming on as a substitute for the last six minutes. The following season he made his first start for Celje, on 2 August 2008, in a 0–0 home draw against Domžale before being substituted by Saša Bakarić. Two weeks later, he scored his first goal in a 2–2 away draw against Primorje. He began to establish himself in the Celje first team from the 2009–10 season, making 24 league appearances and scoring 6 goals.

=== Ludogorets Razgrad ===
On 22 August 2012, Bezjak signed a four-year contract with Bulgarian A Group side Ludogorets Razgrad. He made his debut for Ludogorets against CSKA Sofia on 22 September where he came on as a substitute in a 1–0 home win. His first goals for Ludogorets came on 3 May 2013 when he scored twice in a 3–0 home win over Chernomorets Burgas. He made 14 appearances during the 2012–13 season, finishing with 5 goals.

In the following season, Bezjak became a first team regular. He scored his first goal of the season in the second league game, a 1–0 win at home to Chernomorets Burgas on 27 July 2013. On 27 October 2013, he scored his first-ever career hat-trick, netting four goals in a 5–1 league win over Lyubimets 2007. He also scored three goals in two matches against PSV Eindhoven in the group stage of the Europa League. In February 2014, he netted in both legs of the 4–3 aggregate victory over Lazio in the round of 32 of the Europa League. On 13 March 2014, he earned а penalty kick in the 3–0 home loss against Valencia, but missed from the spot. On 15 May 2014, Bezjak scored the winning goal in the 1–0 victory over Botev Plovdiv in the 2014 Bulgarian Cup Final to help his team achieve a double. He ended the season as the club's top scorer, scoring 20 goals in all competitions.

=== Rijeka ===
On 14 May 2015, Rijeka announced that Bezjak had signed a three-year contract, tying him with the club until June 2018. He made his official début for the club on 10 July 2015, in a goalless away draw against Inter Zaprešić in Round 1 of the Croatian First Football League. On 19 July 2015, Bezjak scored a brace in a 3–3 home draw against Slaven Belupo. With 13 goals to his account, he was the club's top scorer during the 2015–16 season.

=== Jagiellonia Białystok ===
On 1 February 2018, Bezjak signed a two-and-a-half-year contract with Jagiellonia Białystok. His debut for Jagiellonia was against Piast Gliwice in a 2–0 victory, when he was subbed in during the second half. Bezjak's first goal for the club was on 23 February 2018 against Lechia Gdańsk in a 4–2 win at home.

== International career ==
Bezjak earned his first cap for Slovenia on 14 August 2013, after coming on as a substitute in the 2–0 loss against Finland in a friendly match. On 23 March 2016, Bezjak scored his first goal for Slovenia in the 1–0 win against Macedonia. On 8 October 2017, Bezjak scored twice for the 2–2 draw between Slovenia and Scotland.

== Career statistics ==
=== Club ===
As of match played 2 December 2019

Appearances and goals by club, season and competition
Club	Season	League			National cup		Continental		Total	
Club	Season	Division	Apps	Goals	Apps	Goals	Apps	Goals	Apps	Goals
Celje	2007–08	1. SNL	1	0	0	0	—		1	0
Celje	2008–09	1. SNL	11	1	0	0	—		11	1
Celje	2009–10	1. SNL	24	6	4	3	—		28	9
Celje	2010–11	1. SNL	32	7	2	1	—		34	8
Celje	2011–12	1. SNL	34	16	7	1	—		41	17
Celje	2012–13	1. SNL	6	4	0	0	2 (Note: Appearances in UEFA Europa League)	0	8	4
Celje	Total		108	34	13	5	2	0	123	39
Ludogorets	2012–13	A Group	14	5	0	0	—		14	5
Ludogorets	2013–14	A Group	31	13	5	1	15 (Note: Six appearances in UEFA Champions League; nine appearances and six goals in UEFA Europa League)	6	51	20
Ludogorets	2014–15	A Group	15	2	7	0	9 (Note: Appearances in UEFA Champions League)	2	31	4
Ludogorets	Total		60	20	12	1	24	8	96	29
Rijeka	2015–16	1. HNL	32	13	5	4	2	0	39	17
Rijeka	2016–17	1. HNL	23	11	3	0	2	2	28	13
Rijeka	Total		55	24	8	4	4	2	67	30
Darmstadt 98	2016–17	Bundesliga	11	0	1	0	—		12	0
Darmstadt 98	2017–18	2. Bundesliga	3	0	1	0	—		4	0
Darmstadt 98	Total		14	0	2	0	0	0	16	0
Jagiellonia	2017–18	Ekstraklasa	14	3	0	0	0	0	14	3
Jagiellonia	2018–19	Ekstraklasa	16	4	1	0	2	0	19	4
Jagiellonia	Total		30	7	1	0	2	0	33	7
APOEL	2018–19	Cypriot First Division	14	4	5	0	0	0	19	4
APOEL	2019–20	Cypriot First Division	4	0	0	0	7 (Note: Four appearances in UEFA Champions League and three appearances in UEFA Europa League)	0	11	0
APOEL	Total		18	4	5	0	7	0	30	4
Career total			285	89	41	10	39	10	365	109

=== International ===
Appearances and goals by national team and year
National team	Year	Apps	Goals
Slovenia	2013	3	0
Slovenia	2014	2	0
Slovenia	2015	3	0
Slovenia	2016	7	1
Slovenia	2017	4	2
Slovenia	2018	9	1
Slovenia	2019	5	1
Total		33	5

Scores and results list Slovenia's goal tally first, score column indicates score after each Bezjak goal.

List of international goals scored by Roman Bezjak
No.	Date	Venue	Opponent	Score	Result	Competition
1	23 March 2016	Bonifika Stadium, Koper, Slovenia	North Macedonia	1–0	1–0	Friendly
2	8 October 2017	Stožice Stadium, Ljubljana, Slovenia	Scotland	1–1	2–2	2018 FIFA World Cup qualification
3	8 October 2017	Stožice Stadium, Ljubljana, Slovenia	Scotland	2–1	2–2	2018 FIFA World Cup qualification
4	2 June 2018	City Stadium, Podgorica, Montenegro	Montenegro	1–0	2–0	Friendly
5	9 September 2019	Stožice Stadium, Ljubljana, Slovenia	Israel	2–2	3–2	UEFA Euro 2020 qualification

== Honours ==
Ludogorets

- Bulgarian A Group: 2012–13, 2013–14
- Bulgarian Cup: 2013–14
- Bulgarian Supercup: 2014

Rijeka

- Croatian First League: 2016–17

APOEL

- Cypriot First Division: 2018–19
- Cypriot Super Cup: 2019
