= Jozo Špikić =

Bosnian footballer

Personal information
- Date of birth: 31 March 1994 (age 32)
- Place of birth: Tomislavgrad, Bosnia and Herzegovina
- Height: 1.84 m (6 ft 0 in)
- Position: Defender

Youth career
- 2009: HNK Tomislav
- 2009–2013: Široki Brijeg

Senior career*
Years	Team	Apps	(Gls)
2013–2014	Široki Brijeg	24	(3)
2014–2016	Rijeka	1	(0)
2014	→ Rijeka II	8	(0)
2015	→ Osijek (loan)	0	(0)
2015–2016	→ Široki Brijeg (loan)	0	(0)
2016	Imotski	0	(0)
2017–?	SC Oberweikertshofen		

International career
	Bosnia and Herzegovina U19	6	(0)
2013	Bosnia and Herzegovina U21	1	(0)
- * Club domestic league appearances and goals

Jozo Špikić (born 31 March 1994) is a Bosnian former professional footballer who played as a defender.

== Club career ==
A native of Tomislavgrad, after playing for the local club HNK Tomislav, Špikić joined the ranks of NK Široki Brijeg in 2009, aged 15. After passing through the academy there, Špikić established himself as a first-team regular, playing in both Europa League qualifiers against Udinese Calcio as well.

In the summer of 2014 Špikić joined NK Rijeka in the Prva HNL.

In the winter of 2017 Špikić joined SC Oberweikertshofen in the German Landesliga.
