= Tomislav Turčin =

Croatian footballer (born 1997)

Personal information
- Date of birth: 31 May 1997 (age 29)
- Place of birth: Vinkovci, Croatia
- Height: 1.79 m (5 ft 10 in)
- Position: Winger

Team information
- Current team: Radnik Križevci
- Number: 7

Youth career
- 2008: Cibalia
- 2008–2009: Vinkovci
- 2009–2010: Cibalia
- 2010–2011: Dilj
- 2011–2015: Cibalia

Senior career*
Years	Team	Apps	(Gls)
2015–2016	Cibalia	27	(1)
2016–2021	Rijeka	1	(0)
2017–2018	→ Rudeš (loan)	26	(0)
2018–2019	→ Široki Brijeg (loan)	5	(0)
2019–2020	→ Varaždin (loan)	4	(0)
2021	→ Dinamo Zagreb II (loan)	4	(2)
2021–2022	Hrvatski Dragovoljac	12	(0)
2022	Aluminij	14	(0)
2022	Sesvete	10	(1)
2023	Sileks	8	(0)
2023–	Radnik Križevci	9	(7)

International career
2016	Croatia U19	5	(1)
2017	Croatia U21	1	(0)
- * Club domestic league appearances and goals as of 15:46, 22 October 2023 (UTC)

Tomislav Turčin (born 31 May 1997) is a Croatian professional footballer who plays for Radnik Križevci as a winger.

== Club career ==
Born in Vinkovci, Turčin spent his youth years with several hometown clubs, mainly Cibalia. He made his senior debut for Cibalia on 28 February 2015, coming on as a substitute in matchday 19 of the 2014–15 Croatian Second Football League.

In October 2015, he signed a contract with Rijeka until June 2019. Rijeka loaned Turčin back to Cibalia until the end of the 2015–16 season. In July 2017, Turčin was sent on a season-long loan to Rudeš. He made his Croatian First Football League debut for Rudeš on 16 July 2017 against Osijek.

In June 2018, he was sent on another season-long loan, this time to Premier League of Bosnia and Herzegovina club Široki Brijeg. He made his debut for Široki Brijeg on 22 July 2018, in a 1–0 home win against league newcomers Tuzla City.

After Široki Brijeg, Turčin was again sent on a season-long loan, this time to Croatian First League club Varaždin.

Turčin scored his first goal for Rijeka on 7 October 2020 in a cup tie against Dilj.

== International career ==
During 2016, Turčin collected five caps for Croatia's under-19 side. He scored his first international goal in the 2016 UEFA European Under-19 Championship qualifier against Scotland.

== Honours ==
Cibalia

- Croatian Second League: 2015–16
