= David Samuel Nwolokor =

Nigerian footballer

Personal information
- Date of birth: 10 January 1996 (age 30)
- Place of birth: Port Harcourt, Nigeria
- Height: 1.86 m (6 ft 1 in)
- Position: Goalkeeper

Team information
- Current team: Rijeka
- Number: 31

Youth career
- 2013–2014: Abuja Football College Academy

Senior career*
Years	Team	Apps	(Gls)
2014–	Rijeka	0	(0)
2014–2015	→ Rijeka II	20	(0)
2015–2016	→ Šibenik (loan)	16	(0)
2016	→ Šibenik II (loan)	1	(0)
2016–2017	→ Vitez (loan)	26	(0)
2018–2019	→ iClinic Sereď (loan)	12	(0)
2022	→ Aluminij (loan)	5	(0)
2024–	→ Opatija (loan)	58	(0)
- * Club domestic league appearances and goals as of 2 August 2026

David Samuel Nwolokor (born 10 January 1996) is a Nigerian football goalkeeper who plays for Rijeka.

== Career ==
Born in Port Harcourt, Nwolokor moved from the Nigerian Abuja Football College Academy to HNK Rijeka in 2014. In July 2014, soon after arriving, he signed a two-year contract with the club. In his first season with Rijeka, he played for Rijeka II in Croatia's third division. In early 2015, he was an unused substitute for Rijeka's first team in four Prva HNL matches.

In July 2015, Rijeka sent Nwolokor on a season-long loan to Šibenik in Croatia's second division. This was followed by season-long loans to Vitez in the Premier League of Bosnia and Herzegovina and iClinic Sereď in Slovakia.

Nwolokor made his official debut for Rijeka on 7 October 2020, keeping a clean sheet in a cup tie against Dilj.
