= 2016–17 Croatian Football Cup =

Tournament details
- Country: Croatia
- Teams: 48

Final positions
- Champions: Rijeka
- Runners-up: Dinamo Zagreb

Tournament statistics
- Matches played: 49
- Goals scored: 179 (3.65 per match)
- Top goal scorer: Mario Gavranović (7)

The 2016–17 Croatian Football Cup was the twenty-sixth season of Croatia's football knockout competition. The defending champions were Dinamo Zagreb, having won their 14th title the previous year by defeating Slaven Belupo in the final.

== Calendar ==
Round	Date(s)	Number of fixtures	Clubs	New entries this round	Goals / games
Preliminary round	24 August 2016	16	48 → 32	32	61 / 16
First round	21 September 2016	16	32 → 16	16	67 / 16
Second round	26 October 2016	8	16 → 8	none	26 / 8
Quarter-finals	30 November 2016	4	8 → 4	none	9 / 4
Semi-finals	1 and 15 March 2017	4	4 → 2	none	12 / 4
Final	31 May 2017	1	2 → 1	none	4 / 1

== Participating clubs ==
The following 48 teams qualified for the competition:

Best clubs by cup coefficient 16 clubs	Winners and runners up of county cups 32 clubs
Cibalia; Dinamo Zagreb; GOŠK Dubrovnik 1919; Hajduk Split; Inter Zaprešić; Istra 1961; Lokomotiva; Osijek; Rijeka; Slaven Belupo; RNK Split; Šibenik; Zelina; Vinogradar; Zadar; Zagreb	Osijek-Baranja County cup winner: Đakovo Croatia; Osijek-Baranja County cup runner up: BSK Bijelo Brdo; Zagreb County cup winner: Gorica; Zagreb County cup runner up: Samobor; Brod-Posavina County cup winner: Marsonia; Brod-Posavina County cup runner up: Oriolik; Vukovar-Srijem County cup winner: Vukovar 1991; Vukovar-Srijem County cup runner up: Slavonija Soljani; Međimurje County cup winner: Međimurje; Međimurje County cup runner up: Međimurec Pretetinec; City of Zagreb cup winner: Rudeš; City of Zagreb cup runner up: Kustošija; Koprivnica-Križevci County cup winner: Podravac Virje; Koprivnica-Križevci County cup runner up: Koprivnica; Istria County cup winner: Novigrad; Istria County cup runner up: Veli Vrh; Sisak-Moslavina County cup winner: Libertas Novska; Sisak-Moslavina County cup runner up: Lekenik; Varaždin County cup winner: Jalžabet; Varaždin County cup runner up: Varaždin; Virovitica-Podravina County cup winner: Suhopolje; Virovitica-Podravina County cup runner up: Pitomača; Bjelovar-Bilogora County cup winner: Bjelovar; Split-Dalmatia County cup winner: Solin; Primorje-Gorski Kotar County cup winner: Krk; Požega-Slavonia County cup winner: Slavija Pleternica; Dubrovnik-Neretva County cup winner: Neretvanac; Karlovac County cup winner: Karlovac 1919; Zadar County cup winner: Primorac Biograd na Moru; Krapina-Zagorje County cup winner: Zagorec; Šibenik-Knin County cup winner: Zagora Unešić; Lika-Senj County cup winner: Otočac

== Preliminary round ==
The draw for the preliminary single-legged round was held on 3 August 2016 in Zagreb. The matches were played over four days, 20–24 August 2016.

Tie no	Home team	Score	Away team
1	Neretvanac	4–0	Suhopolje
2^{*}	Primorac Biograd na Moru	2–2 (3–5 p)	Jalžabet
3^{**}	Novigrad	3–1	Kustošija
4	Solin	4–1	Zagora Unešić
5	Međimurje	7–0	Karlovac 1919
6	Rudeš	3–1	Oriolik
7^{**}	Podravac Virje	0–5	Krk
8^{**}	Slavonija Soljani	2–3	Varaždin
9	Zagorec	0–2	Veli Vrh
10	Pitomača	2–4	Slavija Pleternica
11	Samobor	3–0	Međimurec Pretetinec
12^{**}	Gorica	1–1 (3–4 p)	BSK Bijelo Brdo
13^{*}	Bjelovar	1–0	Marsonia
14	Đakovo Croatia	0–0 (3–2 p)	Koprivnica
15	Lekenik	0–4	Vukovar 1991
16	Libertas Novska	4–1	Otočac

* Matches were played on 20 August.
** Matches were played on 23 August.

== First round ==
First round consisted of 16 single-leg matches, with 16 winners from the preliminary round joined by 16 clubs with the highest cup coefficients. The matches were played over two days, 20–21 September 2016.

Tie no	Home team	Score	Away team
1^{*}	Veli Vrh	0−5	Dinamo Zagreb
2	Jalžabet	0−6	Hajduk Split
3	Đakovo Croatia	0−3	Rijeka
4	Varaždin	2−2(2–4 p)	Slaven Belupo
5	Vukovar 1991	1−4	Osijek
6^{*}	Krk	1−2	Lokomotiva
7^{*}	Samobor	1−6 (a.e.t)	Cibalia
8	Slavija Pleternica	1−2	RNK Split
9	Neretvanac	1−3	Istra 1961
10	Bjelovar	4−0	Zagreb
11	Solin	1−0	Zadar
12^{*}	BSK Bijelo Brdo	2−3	Inter Zaprešić
13	Libertas Novska	2−5	Vinogradar
14	Rudeš	3−0	GOŠK Dubrovnik 1919
15^{*}	Međimurje	1−2 (a.e.t)	Šibenik
16	Novigrad	4−0	Zelina

* Matches were played on 20 September.

== Second round ==
Second round consisted of eight single-legged ties, with 16 winners from the first round. The pairings were determined by cup coefficients. The matches were played on 26 October 2016.

Tie no	Home team	Score	Away team
1^{*}	Bjelovar	1−2	Dinamo Zagreb
2	Solin	1−2	Hajduk Split
3	Rudeš	3−5 (a.e.t)	Rijeka
4^{*}	Novigrad	0−1	Slaven Belupo
5	Šibenik	1−2	Osijek
6	Vinogradar	1−2	Lokomotiva
7	Inter Zaprešić	1−0	Cibalia
8^{*}	Istra 1961	1−3 (a.e.t)	RNK Split

* Matches played on 25 October.

== Quarter-finals ==
Quarter-final consisted of four single-legged ties and included 8 winners from the second round. The pairings were determined by cup coefficients. The matches were played on 30 November 2016.

Tie no	Home team	Score	Away team
1	Inter Zaprešić	0−1	Dinamo Zagreb
2	RNK Split	2−1 (a.e.t)	Hajduk Split
3^{*}	Lokomotiva	1−3	Rijeka
4	Osijek	1−0	Slaven Belupo

* Match played on 29 November.

== Semi-finals ==
Semi-final consisted of two two-legged ties and included 4 winners from the quarter-final. The first leg was played 1 March 2017 and the return leg on 15 March 2017.

1 March 2017
16:45

Dinamo Zagreb	6−0	RNK Split
Hodžić 37', 51', 66', 81' (pen.); Ćorić 26', 78'	Report

Stadion Maksimir, Zagreb
Attendance: 1,623
Referee: Igor Križarić (Čakovec)
14 March 2017
17:00

RNK Split	0−0	Dinamo Zagreb
	Report

Stadion Park mladeži, Split
Attendance: 695
Referee: Marko Matoc (Zaprešić)

Dinamo Zagreb won 6–0 on aggregate.

1 March 2017
18:30

Rijeka	3−1	Osijek
Gavranović 9', 23', 71'	Report	Perošević 75' (pen.)

Stadion Rujevica, Rijeka
Attendance: 5,105
Referee: Fran Jović (Zagreb)
15 March 2017
17:00

Osijek	0−2	Rijeka
	Report	Škorić 52' (o.g.); Andrijašević 57'

Stadion Gradski vrt, Osijek
Attendance: 4,467
Referee: Duje Strukan (Split)

Rijeka won 5–1 on aggregate.

== Final ==
The final was played on 31 May 2017 at Stadion Varteks in Varaždin.

31 May 2017
20:15

Dinamo Zagreb	1−3	Rijeka
Olmo 37'	Report	Gavranović 24', 46'; Župarić 73'

Stadion Varteks, Varaždin
Attendance: 8,183
Referee: Ante Vučemilović-Šimunović (Osijek)

== Bracket ==
Second round 25–26 October 2016
Vinogradar	1
Lokomotiva	2
Rudeš	3
Rijeka	5 (a.e.t.)
Šibenik	1
Osijek	2
Novigrad	0
Slaven Belupo	1
Inter Zaprešić	1
Cibalia	0
Bjelovar	1
Dinamo Zagreb	2
Istra 1961	1
RNK Split	3 (a.e.t.)
Solin	1
Hajduk Split	2

Quarter-finals; 29–30 November 2016
Lokomotiva	1
Rijeka	3
Osijek	1
Slaven Belupo	0
Inter Zaprešić	0
Dinamo Zagreb	1
RNK Split	2 (a.e.t.)
Hajduk Split	1

Semi-finals; 1–15 March 2017
Rijeka	5 (Note: Played over two legs.)
Osijek	1
Dinamo Zagreb	6 (Note: Played over two legs.)
RNK Split	0

Final; 31 May 2017
Rijeka	3
Dinamo Zagreb	1

== Top scorers ==
Rank	Player	Club(s)	Goals
1	(Switzerland) Mario Gavranović	Rijeka	7
