= 2012–13 HNK Rijeka season =

Rijeka
2012–13 season
- Chairman: Damir Mišković
- Manager: Elvis Scoria (until 24 Feb 2013); Matjaž Kek (from 27 Feb 2013)
- Stadium: Stadion Kantrida
- Prva HNL: 3rd
- Croatian Cup: First round
- Top goalscorer: League: Leon Benko (18); All: Leon Benko (18)
- Highest home attendance: 9,000 v Dinamo (5 May 2013)
- Lowest home attendance: 1,000 v Cibalia (23 February 2013)
- Average home league attendance: 4,059
Home colours	Away colours	Third colours

The 2012–13 season was the 67th season in HNK Rijeka’s history. It was their 22nd successive season in the Prva HNL, and 39th successive top tier season.

== Competitions ==
Competition	First match	Last match	Starting round	Final position	Record							
Competition	First match	Last match	Starting round	Final position	G	W	D	L	GF	GA	GD	Win %
Prva HNL	20 July 2012	26 May 2013	Matchday 1	3rd	33	15	8	10	46	42	+4	45.45
Croatian Cup	26 September 2012	26 September 2012	First round	First round	1	0	0	1	0	1	−1	0.00
Total					34	15	8	11	46	43	+3	44.12

=== Prva HNL ===
==== League table ====
Pos	Team	Pld	W	D	L	GF	GA	GD	Pts	Qualification or relegation
1	Dinamo Zagreb (C)	33	24	5	4	68	20	+48	77	Qualification to Champions League second qualifying round
2	Lokomotiva	33	16	9	8	54	38	+16	57	Qualification to Europa League second qualifying round (Note: Hajduk Split qualify for 2013–14 Europa League Second qualifying round as winners of 2012–13 Croatian Cup.)
3	Rijeka	33	15	8	10	46	42	+4	53	Qualification to Europa League second qualifying round
4	Hajduk Split	33	14	10	9	45	31	+14	52	Qualification to Europa League second qualifying round
5	RNK Split	33	15	7	11	49	37	+12	52	

Source: Sportnet.hr
Rules for classification: 1) points; 2) goal difference; 3) number of goals scored.
For deciding champions, qualification to UEFA Europa League and relegation: 1st points; 2nd head-to-head points; 3rd head-to-head goal difference; 4th head-to-head away goals scored
(C) Champions

==== Results summary ====
Overall								Home						Away					
Pld	W	D	L	GF	GA	GD	Pts	W	D	L	GF	GA	GD	W	D	L	GF	GA	GD
33	15	8	10	46	42	+4	53	9	5	3	24	16	+8	6	3	7	22	26	−4

Last updated: 26 May 2013.
Source: Sportnet.hr

==== Results by round ====
Round	1	2	3	4	5	6	7	8	9	10	11	12	13	14	15	16	17	18	19	20	21	22	23	24	25	26	27	28	29	30	31	32	33
Ground	A	H	A	H	A	A	H	A	H	A	H	H	A	H	A	H	H	A	H	A	H	A	H	A	H	H	A	H	A	H	A	H	A
Result	L	D	W	D	D	L	W	W	W	L	W	L	W	W	L	W	W	D	D	L	D	D	W	W	W	W	L	L	W	D	L	L	W
Position	11	10	7	7	8	8	8	6	5	7	6	7	5	3	5	3	2	2	4	5	5	5	5	4	4	2	4	5	3	4	4	5	3

Updated to match(es) played on 26 May 2013. Source: Competitive matches
A = Away; H = Home; W = Win; D = Draw; L = Loss

==== Results by opponent ====
Team	Results			Points
Team	1	2	3	Points
Cibalia	1–4	0–0	1–0	4
Dinamo Zagreb	3–0	1–4	0–0	4
Hajduk Split	1–0	1–1	2–1	7
Inter Zaprešić	0–2	2–1	2–1	6
Istra 1961	2–1	1–1	0–1	4
Lokomotiva	2–2	1–2	1–3	1
Osijek	1–1	3–1	1–0	7
Slaven Belupo	3–1	0–0	2–1	7
RNK Split	0–2	2–3	1–3	0
Zadar	0–0	4–2	2–3	4
NK Zagreb	1–0	1–0	4–1	9

Source: 2012–13 Prva HNL article

== Matches ==
=== Prva HNL ===
20 July 2012 1	RNK Split	2–0	Rijeka	Split
21:00 CEST (UTC+02:00)	Vojnović 13' (yellow card) 41'; Pehar (yellow card) 49'; Baraban 57'; Rebić (yellow card) 60'	Report	Knežević (yellow card) 66'; Miloš (yellow card) 86'	Stadium: Stadion Park Mladeži; Attendance: 2,000; Referee: Igor Križarić (Čakovec)

27 July 2012 2	Rijeka	0–0	Zadar	Rijeka
20:00 CEST (UTC+02:00)		Report	Ćurjurić (yellow card) 28'; Banović (yellow card) 45+2'; Sarić (yellow card) 48'; Vasilj (yellow card) 55'; Tokić (yellow card) 90+2'; Jerbić (yellow card) 90+6'	Stadium: Stadion Kantrida; Attendance: 4,500; Referee: Bruno Marić (Daruvar)

3 August 2012 3	Zagreb	0–1	Rijeka	Zagreb
20:00 CEST (UTC+02:00)	Pavlović (yellow card) 79'	Report	Weitzer 84'	Stadium: Stadion Kranjčevićeva; Attendance: 1,000; Referee: Mario Zebec (Cestica)

11 August 2012 4	Rijeka	2–2	Lokomotiva	Rijeka
21:00 CEST (UTC+02:00)	Weitzer 52'; Brezovec (yellow card) 55'; Benko 68'; Čaval (yellow card) 82'; Mutombo (yellow card) 83'	Report	Brozović 27'; Boras 39'; Bručić (yellow card) 58'; Martinac (yellow card) 67'	Stadium: Stadion Kantrida; Attendance: 4,500; Referee: Tihomir Pejin (Donji Miholjac)

18 August 2012 5	Osijek	1–1	Rijeka	Osijek
19:00 CEST (UTC+02:00)	Perošević 10' (pen.); Zulim (yellow card) 22'; Vrgoč (red card) 24'; Aleksić (yellow card) 32'; Smoje (yellow card) 54'	Report	Kreilach (yellow card) 45'; Neretljak (yellow card) 48'; Mujanović 67'; Miloš (yellow card) 84'	Stadium: Stadion Gradski vrt Attendance: 1,000; Referee: Marijo Strahonja (Zagreb)

24 August 2012 6	Inter Zaprešić	2–0	Rijeka	Zaprešić
20:00 CEST (UTC+02:00)	Čeliković (yellow card) 6'; Šarić 79' (pen.) 89' (pen.)	Report	Brezovec (yellow card) 25'; Lisjak (yellow card) 88'	Stadium: Stadion ŠRC Zaprešić; Attendance: 1,500; Referee: Ante Vučemilović-Šimunović (Osijek)

1 September 2012 7	Rijeka	1–0	Hajduk Split	Rijeka
21:00 CEST (UTC+02:00)	Kreilach 81' (pen.); Čaval (yellow card) 86'; Mujanović (red card) 90+1'	Report	Vršajević (yellow card) 31'; Maloča (yellow card) 52'; Milović (yellow card) 60'; Jonjić (yellow card) 74'; Blažević (yellow card) 80'	Stadium: Stadion Kantrida; Attendance: 6,000; Referee: Igor Križarić (Čakovec)

16 September 2012 8	Slaven Belupo	1–3	Rijeka	Koprivnica
19:00 CEST (UTC+02:00)	Vugrinec 50'; Maras (yellow card) 58'; Čanađija (yellow card) 80'	Report	Cesarec 16' (yellow card) 88'; Benko 45+1' (yellow card) 77'; Čulina (yellow card) 77'; Brezovec (yellow card) 82'; Lisjak (yellow card) 90+1'; Močinić 90+4'	Stadium: Gradski stadion Attendance: 2,638; Referee: Mario Zebec (Cestica)

22 September 2012 9	Rijeka	3–0	Dinamo Zagreb	Rijeka
19:00 CEST (UTC+02:00)	Cesarec 16'; Neretljak (yellow card) 35'; Weitzer 54'; Mujanović (yellow card) 72'; Kreilach 82' (pen.)	Report	Kelava (yellow card) 35'; Čop (yellow card) 62'; Vrsaljko (yellow card) 81'; Pivarić (yellow card) 86'	Stadium: Stadion Kantrida; Attendance: 8,000; Referee: Zlatko Šimčić (Koprivnica)

29 September 2012 10	Cibalia	4–1	Rijeka	Vinkovci
15:30 CEST (UTC+02:00)	Neretljak 2' (o.g.); Paradžiković (yellow card) 5'; Matoš 16', 26' (pen.); Mišić (yellow card) 29'; Bartolović (yellow card) 77'; Terzić 81' (yellow card) 81'; Muženjak (yellow card) 84'	Report	Knežević (yellow card) 25'; Brezovec 57'	Stadium: Stadion HNK Cibalia; Attendance: 1,000; Referee: Goran Gabrilo (Split)

6 October 2012 11	Rijeka	2–1	Istra 1961	Rijeka
19:00 CEST (UTC+02:00)	Datković (yellow card) 20' (goal) 89'; Benko (yellow card) 33'; Cesarec 43' (yellow card) 48'	Report	Bačelić-Grgić 21' (pen.) (yellow card) 32'; Ottochian (yellow card) 26'	Stadium: Stadion Kantrida; Attendance: 3,500; Referee: Damir Batinić (Osijek)

20 October 2012 12	Rijeka	2–3	RNK Split	Rijeka
19:00 CEST (UTC+02:00)	Benko 21'; Datković 59' (yellow card) 63'; Čulina (yellow card) 86'; Mutombo (yellow card) 90+4'	Report	Rebić 33'; Vitaić 45'; Vuković (yellow card) 56'; Hrgović (yellow card) 64'; Glumac 71'; Radotić (yellow card) 74'; Pehar (yellow card) 75'; Baraban (yellow card) 87'	Stadium: Stadion Kantrida; Attendance: 4,500; Referee: Danijel Trampus (Osijek)

27 October 2012 13	Zadar	2–4	Rijeka	Zadar
19:00 CEST (UTC+02:00)	Ćurjurić (yellow card) 44'; Bilaver (yellow card) 66'; Heister (yellow card) 67'; Gluić (yellow card) 74'; Perica (yellow card) 77'; Banović 81'; Jerbić 85'	Report	Cesarec 6'; Marić (yellow card) 20'; Benko 66'; Kreilach 74' (pen.); Čulina 80'	Stadium: Stadion Stanovi; Attendance: 1,000; Referee: Ante Vučemilović-Šimunović (Osijek)

3 November 2012 14	Rijeka	1–0	Zagreb	Rijeka
15:00 CET (UTC+01:00)	Benko 44'; Mujanović (yellow card) 59'; Brezovec (yellow card) 69'; Cesarec (yellow card) 90+3'	Report	Štrok (yellow card) 41'; Mitrović (yellow card) 78'	Stadium: Stadion Kantrida; Attendance: 3,000; Referee: Zlatko Šimčić (Koprivnica)

11 November 2012 15	Lokomotiva	2–1	Rijeka	Zagreb
19:00 CET (UTC+01:00)	Mesarić (yellow card) 38'; Trebotić 45+1'; Maleš (yellow card) 74'; Samateh (yellow card) 75'; Martinac 83'	Report	Datković (yellow card) 25'; Benko (yellow card) 25'; Neretljak 72'; Weitzer (yellow card) 90+1'	Stadium: Stadion Maksimir; Attendance: 200; Referee: Damir Batinić (Osijek)

18 November 2012 16	Rijeka	3–1	Osijek	Rijeka
19:00 CET (UTC+01:00)	Brezovec 13'; Cesarec 24', 87'; Kreilach (yellow card) 72'; Weitzer (yellow card) 79'	Report	Zubak 29'; Mišić (yellow card) 32'; Lešković (yellow card) 49'; Novaković (yellow card) 58'; Smoje (yellow card) 78'; Aleksić (yellow card) 83'	Stadium: Stadion Kantrida; Attendance: 3,000; Referee: Goran Gabrilo (Split)

24 November 2012 17	Rijeka	2–1	Inter Zaprešić	Rijeka
19:00 CET (UTC+01:00)	Brezovec (yellow card) 38'; Kreilach (yellow card) 40'; Benko 68', 76' (yellow card) 83'	Report	Oršić 26'; Herceg (yellow card) 32'; Milardović (yellow card) 38'; Bagarić (yellow card) 41'; Budimir (yellow card) 58'; Čeliković (yellow card) 60'; Mlinar (yellow card) 72'; Plazanić (yellow card) 82'	Stadium: Stadion Kantrida; Attendance: 3,500; Referee: Mario Zebec (Cestica)

2 December 2012 18	Hajduk Split	1–1	Rijeka	Split
19:00 CET (UTC+01:00)	Radošević (yellow card) 45'; Andrijašević (yellow card) 50'; Maglica 51' (red card) 90+5'	Report	Močinić (yellow card) 33'; Benko 45+1'; Cesarec (yellow card) 49'; Mutombo (yellow card) 90+4'; Knežević (red card) 90+5'	Stadium: Stadion Poljud; Attendance: 7,000; Referee: Domagoj Ljubičić (Osijek)

8 December 2012 19	Rijeka	0–0	Slaven Belupo	Rijeka
19:00 CET (UTC+01:00)	Kreilach (penalty missed) 81'	Report	Bubnjić (yellow card) 29'; Pranjić (yellow card) 40'; Barić (yellow card) 78'; Čanađija (yellow card) 88'; Delić (yellow card) 90+10'	Stadium: Stadion Kantrida; Attendance: 2,000; Referee: Danijel Trampus (Osijek)

17 February 2013 20	Dinamo Zagreb	4–1	Rijeka	Zagreb
18:00 CET (UTC+01:00)	Krstanović 6'; Čop 22', 25', 50'	Report	Datković (yellow card) 42'; Benko 63'	Stadium: Stadion Maksimir; Attendance: 4,000; Referee: Zlatko Šimčić (Koprivnica)

23 February 2013 21	Rijeka	0–0	Cibalia	Rijeka
18:00 CET (UTC+01:00)	Knežević (yellow card) 17'; Čaval (yellow card) 35'	Report	Mazalović (yellow card) 53'; Matković (yellow card) 90'	Stadium: Stadion Kantrida; Attendance: 1,000; Referee: Marin Vidulin (Kanfanar)

3 March 2013 22	Istra 1961	1–1	Rijeka	Pula
18:00 CET (UTC+01:00)	Bačelić-Grgić 13' (pen.); Blagojević (yellow card) 15'	Report	Mujanović (yellow card) 12'; Kreilach 16' (pen.); Datković (yellow card) 62'; Močinić (yellow card) 71'	Stadium: Stadion Aldo Drosina; Attendance: 5,000; Referee: Zlatko Šimčić (Koprivnica)

9 March 2013 23	Rijeka	2–1	Inter Zaprešić	Rijeka
15:00 CET (UTC+01:00)	Kreilach 20' (yellow card) 69'; Cesarec 34'; Mutombo (yellow card) 90+2'	Report	Oršić 1'; Bagarić (yellow card) 28'; Šarić (yellow card) 42'; Pokrivač (yellow card) 66'; Herceg (yellow card) 76'; Kramarić (yellow card) 82'	Stadium: Stadion Kantrida; Attendance: 1,500; Referee: Duje Strukan (Split)

16 March 2013 24	Cibalia	0–1	Rijeka	Vinkovci
15:00 CET (UTC+01:00)	Bartolović (yellow card) 77'	Report	Benko 17'; Alispahić (yellow card) 37'	Stadium: Stadion HNK Cibalia; Attendance: 1,500; Referee: Dalibor Mlakar (Zagreb)

29 March 2013 25	Rijeka	2–1	Slaven Belupo	Rijeka
19:00 CET (UTC+01:00)	Benko 37', 82' (yellow card) 62'; Mance (yellow card) 90+2'	Report	Herent (yellow card) 27'; Barić (yellow card) 62'; Novinić 90'	Stadium: Stadion Kantrida; Attendance: 2,500; Referee: Mario Zebec (Cestica)

6 April 2013 26	Rijeka	1–0	Osijek	Rijeka
19:00 CEST (UTC+02:00)	Benko 31'; Brezovec (yellow card) 42'	Report	Pavić (yellow card) 38'; Tomašević (yellow card) 53'; Kurtović (yellow card) 90+1'	Stadium: Stadion Kantrida; Attendance: 4,000; Referee: Vlado Svilokos (Sisak)

12 April 2013 27	RNK Split	3–1	Rijeka	Split
18:00 CEST (UTC+02:00)	Rebić 67'; Barišić 84'; Erceg 87' (yellow card) 87'	Report	Benko 86'	Stadium: Stadion Park Mladeži; Attendance: 1,500; Referee: Marijo Strahonja (Zagreb)

20 April 2013 28	Rijeka	1–3	Lokomotiva	Rijeka
19:00 CEST (UTC+02:00)	Brezovec (yellow card) 25'; Alispahić (yellow card) 62'; Benko 77'	Report	Antolić 16'; Pjaca (yellow card) 22'; Šitum 56'; Peko (yellow card) 87' (goal) 90+2'	Stadium: Stadion Kantrida; Attendance: 5,000; Referee: Marko Matoc (Zaprešić)

28 April 2013 29	Hajduk Split	1–2	Rijeka	Split
19:00 CEST (UTC+02:00)	Oremuš (yellow card) 19'; Blažević (yellow card) 36'; Sušić 53'	Report	Mujanović 21'; Benko 36'; Neretljak (yellow card) 57'; Brezovec (yellow card) 61'; Škarabot (yellow card) 74'	Stadium: Stadion Poljud; Attendance: 10,000; Referee: Tihomir Pejin (Donji Miholjac)

5 May 2013 30	Rijeka	0–0	Dinamo Zagreb	Rijeka
19:00 CEST (UTC+02:00)	Brezovec (yellow card) 56'	Report	Addy (yellow card) 16'; Sammir (yellow card) 22'; Šimunić (yellow card) 48'; Leko (yellow card) 88'	Stadium: Stadion Kantrida; Attendance: 9,000; Referee: Vlado Svilokos (Sisak)

10 May 2013 31	Istra 1961	1–0	Rijeka	Pula
20:00 CEST (UTC+02:00)	Anđelković (yellow card) 47'; Blagojević (yellow card) 79'; Hadžić 86' (yellow card) 87'; Aganović (yellow card) 89'; Budicin (yellow card) 90+4'	Report	Mujanović (yellow card) 59'; Mutombo (yellow card) 64'; Benko (yellow card) 90+4'	Stadium: Stadion Aldo Drosina; Attendance: 4,000; Referee: Mario Zebec (Cestica)

18 May 2013 32	Rijeka	2–3	Zadar	Rijeka
19:00 CEST (UTC+02:00)	Mujanović 12'; Jogan 53'	Report	Ivančić 29'; Banović (yellow card) 34' (goal) 57'; Jerbić (yellow card) 60'; Perica 90+1'; Sarić (yellow card) 90+3'	Stadium: Stadion Kantrida; Attendance: 3,500; Referee: Ante Vučemilović-Šimunović (Osijek)

26 May 2013 33	Zagreb	1–4	Rijeka	Zagreb
18:00 CEST (UTC+02:00)	Kovačić (yellow card) 32'; Abdurahimi 76'	Report	Škarabot (yellow card) 6'; Benko 12', 54'; Mujanović (yellow card) 19'; Jugović 37'; Čulina 80'	Stadium: Stadion Kranjčevićeva; Attendance: 400; Referee: Igor Križarić (Čakovec)

Source: HRnogomet.com

=== Croatian Cup ===
26 September 2012 R1	Nedelišće	1–0 (a.e.t.)	Rijeka	Hrašćica
15:30 CEST (UTC+02:00)	Jagec (yellow card) 39' (goal) 96' (pen.); Bujanić (yellow card) 76'; Perko (yellow card) 87'; Pintarić (yellow card) 113'	Report	Cesarec (yellow card) 60'; Močinić (red card) 112'	Stadium: Dunjkovec-Pretetinec; Attendance: 800; Referee: Andrej Burilo (Osijek)

Source: HRnogomet.com

=== Friendlies ===
==== Pre-season ====
Date	Venue	Opponent	Score	Rijeka Scorers
23 Jun	N (Slovenia)	(Georgia (country)) Metalurgi	1–0	Kreilach
26 Jun	N (Slovenia)	(Austria) SV Heiligenkreuz	4–1	Gabrić, Cuculi, Mutombo, Čulina
1 Jul	H	(Russia) Tom Tomsk	2–0	Benko (2)
4 Jul	N (Croatia)	(Slovenia) Gorica	2–0	Čulina (2)
6 Jul	N (Slovenia)	(Ukraine) Sevastopol	1–1	Kreilach
9 Jul	A	(Slovenia) Radomlje	5–0	Matovina, Mutombo, Benko (2), Čulina
11 Jul	N (Slovenia)	(Romania) Gaz Metan Severin	1–2	Benko
14 Jul	H	(Slovenia) Šampion	5–1	Neretljak, Brezovec, Vranješ, Benko (2)

==== On-season ====
Date	Venue	Opponent	Score	Rijeka Scorers
24 Jul	H	(Croatia) Opatija	5–0	Dangubić (2), Miloš, Weitzer, Benko
14 Aug	A	(Croatia) Crikvenica	6–0	Cesarec (3), Mujanović, Brezovec, Benko
5 Sep	A	(Croatia) Pomorac	3–1	Cesarec, Weitzer, Mujanović
8 Sep	A	(Italy) Udinese	1–1	Benko
12 Sep	A	(Croatia) Grobničan	5–1	Gabrić, Mutombo, Čulina (2), Mujanović
13 Oct	A	(Italy) Torino	2–2	Mujanović, Benko

==== Mid-season ====
Date	Venue	Opponent	Score	Rijeka Scorers
16 Jan	A	(Italy) Spezia	2–0	Mujanović (2)
20 Jan	N (Turkey)	(Germany) Goslarer SC 08	1–2	Jogan
23 Jan	N (Turkey)	(Switzerland) FC Zürich	0–0	
26 Jan	N (Turkey)	(China) Shandong Luneng	1–1	Benko
28 Jan	N (Turkey)	(Russia) Krylia Sovetov	0–2	
30 Jan	N (Turkey)	(Ukraine) Metalurh Donetsk	1–3	Kreilach
31 Jan	N (Turkey)	(Austria) Ried	0–1	
6 Feb	H	(Bosnia and Herzegovina) Željezničar Sarajevo	1–1	Jogan
9 Feb	H	(Croatia) Orijent	3–0	Benko (2), Jogan

== Player seasonal records ==
Competitive matches only. Updated to games played 26 May 2013.

=== Top scorers ===
Rank	Name	League	Cup	Total
1	(Croatia) Leon Benko	18	–	18
2	(Croatia) Danijel Cesarec	7	–	7
3	(Croatia) Damir Kreilach	5	–	5
4	(Croatia) Ivor Weitzer	3	–	3
4	(Croatia) Goran Mujanović	3	–	3
6	(Croatia) Niko Datković	2	–	2
6	(Croatia) Josip Brezovec	2	–	2
6	(Croatia) Antonini Čulina	2	–	2
9	(Croatia) Mato Neretljak	1	–	1
9	(Croatia) Ivan Močinić	1	–	1
9	(Croatia) Vedran Jugović	1	–	1
9	(Slovenia) Kris Jogan	1	–	1
TOTALS		46	–	46

Source: Competitive matches

=== Disciplinary record ===
Includes all competitive matches. Players with 1 card or more included only.

Number	Position	Name	1. HNL (Note: Two yellow cards resulting in a red are counted as a total of three cards - i.e. two yellow and one red card.)		Croatian Cup		Total	
Number	Position	Name	Booked	Sent off (straight red)	Booked	Sent off (straight red)	Booked	Sent off (straight red)
1	GK	(Croatia) Ivan Mance	1	0	0	0	1	0
3	DF	(Croatia) Kristijan Čaval	3	0	0	0	3	0
4	DF	(Slovenia) Matija Škarabot	2	0	0	0	2	0
5	DF	(Croatia) Dario Knežević	3	1	0	0	3	1
6	DF	(Croatia) Niko Datković	6	0	0	0	6	0
7	DF	(Croatia) Mato Miloš	2	0	0	0	2	0
8	MF	(Croatia) Goran Mujanović	7	1	0	0	7	1
9	FW	(Croatia) Danijel Cesarec	4	0	1	0	5	0
11	MF	(Bosnia and Herzegovina) Mehmed Alispahić	2	0	0	0	2	0
12	GK	(Croatia) Robert Lisjak	2	0	0	0	2	0
13	MF	(Croatia) Ivor Weitzer	2	0	0	0	2	0
15	MF	(Croatia) Antonini Čulina	2	0	0	0	2	0
16	MF	(Croatia) Ivan Močinić	2	0	2	1	4	1
17	MF	(Croatia) Damir Kreilach	4	0	0	0	4	0
19	FW	(Croatia) Leon Benko	6	0	0	0	6	0
23	DF	(Croatia) Mato Neretljak	3	0	0	0	3	0
28	DF	(Croatia) Luka Marić	1	0	0	0	1	0
30	MF	(Croatia) Josip Brezovec	9	0	0	0	9	0
90	FW	(Belgium) Andrea Mbuyi-Mutombo	5	0	0	0	5	0
TOTALS			66	2	3	1	69	3

=== Appearances and goals ===
Number	Position	Player	Apps	Goals	Apps	Goals	Apps	Goals
Number	Position	Player	Total		1. HNL (Note: First number represents appearances in starting eleven, while the second number indicates a substitute appearance.)		Croatian Cup	
1	GK	(Croatia) Ivan Mance	15	0	15+0	0	0+0	0
3	DF	(Croatia) Kristijan Čaval	18	0	14+4	0	0+0	0
4	DF	(Slovenia) Matija Škarabot	13	0	13+0	0	0+0	0
5	DF	(Croatia) Dario Knežević	32	0	31+0	0	1+0	0
6	DF	(Croatia) Niko Datković	18	2	15+2	2	1+0	0
7	DF	(Croatia) Mato Miloš	7	0	2+5	0	0+0	0
8	FW	(Croatia) Goran Mujanović	30	3	22+7	3	1+0	0
9	FW	(Croatia) Danijel Cesarec	23	7	20+2	7	1+0	0
10	MF	(Croatia) Antonini Čulina	27	2	13+13	2	1+0	0
11	MF	(Bosnia and Herzegovina) Mehmed Alispahić	14	0	13+1	0	0+0	0
11	MF	(Croatia) Jurica Vranješ	6	0	2+4	0	0+0	0
12	GK	(Croatia) Robert Lisjak	19	0	17+1	0	1+0	0
13	MF	(Croatia) Ivor Weitzer	22	3	8+13	3	1+0	0
16	MF	(Croatia) Ivan Močinić	20	1	9+10	1	0+1	0
17	MF	(Croatia) Damir Kreilach	31	5	30+0	5	1+0	0
19	FW	(Croatia) Leon Benko	31	18	30+0	18	0+1	0
22	MF	(Poland) Łukasz Mierzejewski	17	0	14+3	0	0+0	0
23	DF	(Croatia) Mato Neretljak	25	1	23+2	1	0+0	0
28	DF	(Croatia) Luka Marić	21	0	16+4	0	1+0	0
30	MF	(Croatia) Josip Brezovec	31	2	30+0	2	1+0	0
32	GK	(Croatia) Ivan Vargić	1	0	1+0	0	0+0	0
77	MF	(Croatia) Drago Gabrić	12	0	6+6	0	0+0	0
88	FW	(Slovenia) Kris Jogan	5	1	1+4	1	0+0	0
88	DF	(Italy) Diego Vannucci	1	0	0+0	0	1+0	0
89	MF	(Croatia) Vedran Jugović	12	1	11+1	1	0+0	0
90	FW	(Belgium) Andréa Mbuyi-Mutombo	21	0	7+13	0	0+1	0

=== Penalties ===
For
Date	Competition	Player	Opposition	Scored?
1 Sep 2012	1. HNL	(Croatia) Damir Kreilach	Hajduk Split	✓
22 Sep 2012	1. HNL	(Croatia) Damir Kreilach	Dinamo Zagreb	✓
27 Oct 2012	1. HNL	(Croatia) Damir Kreilach	Zadar	✓
8 Dec 2012	1. HNL	(Croatia) Damir Kreilach	Slaven Belupo	✗
3 Mar 2013	1. HNL	(Croatia) Damir Kreilach	Istra 1961	✓
Against
Date	Competition	Goalkeeper	Opposition	Scored?
18 Aug 2012	1. HNL	(Croatia) Robert Lisjak	Osijek	✓
24 Aug 2012	1. HNL	(Croatia) Robert Lisjak	Inter Zaprešić	✓
24 Aug 2012	1. HNL	(Croatia) Robert Lisjak	Inter Zaprešić	✓
26 Sep 2012	Cup	(Croatia) Robert Lisjak	Nedelišće	✓
29 Sep 2012	1. HNL	(Croatia) Robert Lisjak	Cibalia	✓
6 Oct 2012	1. HNL	(Croatia) Robert Lisjak	Istra 1961	✓
3 Mar 2013	1. HNL	(Croatia) Ivan Mance	Istra 1961	✓
