= 2010–11 Club Atlas season =

Mexican football club season

The 2010–11 Atlas season was the 64th professional season of Mexico's top-flight football league. The season is split into two tournaments—the Torneo Apertura and the Torneo Clausura—each with identical formats and each contested by the same eighteen teams. Atlas began their season on July 25, 2010, against Morelia.

== Torneo Apertura ==
=== Squad ===
Note: Flags indicate national team as defined under FIFA eligibility rules; some limited exceptions apply. Players may hold more than one non-FIFA nationality.

No.	Pos.	Nation	Player
1	GK	MEX	José Francisco Canales
2	DF	ARG	Fabricio Fuentes
3	DF	MEX	Néstor Vidrio (Vice-Captain)
4	DF	MEX	Luis Robles
5	DF	MEX	Ricardo Jiménez
6	MF	MEX	Gerardo Espinoza
7	MF	MEX	Diego Campos
8	MF	COL	Michael Ortega
9	FW	MEX	Hebert Alférez
10	FW	ARG	Alfredo Moreno
11	FW	MEX	Daniel Osorno
12	GK	MEX	Pedro Hernández
13	MF	PAR	Enrique Vera

No.	Pos.	Nation	Player
15	DF	MEX	Gerardo Flores
17	FW	PAR	Jorge Achucarro
18	MF	MEX	Jesús Arturo Paganoni
19	MF	MEX	Saúl Villalobos
21	GK	MEX	Florencio Morán
22	MF	MEX	Edgar Pacheco
24	MF	MEX	Gregorio Torres
26	FW	MEX	Flavio Santos
30	DF	MEX	Dárvin Chávez
38	MF	MEX	César Ibáñez
57	MF	MEX	Jonathan Piña
58	MF	MEX	Carlos Balcázar

=== Season results ===
==== Regular season ====
July 25, 2010 Round 1	Morelia	1 – 0	Atlas	Estadio Morelos, Morelia
12:00pm	Rey 69'	Report		Referee: Mauricio Morales

July 31, 2010 Round 2	Querétaro	2 – 1	Atlas	Estadio La Corregidora, Querétaro
5:00pm	Blanco 55'; Nava 57'	Report	Vidrio 89'	Referee: Julio Escobar

August 7, 2010 Round 3	Atlas	0 – 1	Necaxa	Estadio Jalisco, Guadalajara
8:45pm		Report	Gandín 25'	Referee: Marco Antonio Rodríguez

August 15, 2010 Round 4	América	1 – 1	Atlas	Estadio Azteca, Mexico City
4:30pm	Vuoso 17'	Report	Fuentes 59'	Referee: Miguel Ángel Flores

August 21, 2010 Round 5	Atlas	0 – 1	Toluca	Estadio Jalisco, Guadalajara
8:45pm		Report	Sinha 90'	Referee: Fernando Guerrero

August 27, 2010 Round 6	Santos Laguna	3 – 1	Atlas	Estadio Corona, Torreón
7:00pm	Morales 57'; Benítez 62'; Ludueña 83'	Report	Fuentes 85'	Referee: Armando Archundia

September 11, 2010 Round 7	Atlas	1 – 3	Cruz Azul	Estadio Jalisco, Guadalajara
8:45pm	Cervantes 17'; Orozco 33'; Giménez 88'	Report	Torres 75'	Referee: José Alfredo Peñaloza

September 18, 2010 Round 8	Monterrey	2 – 0	Atlas	Estadio Tecnológico, Monterrey
7:00pm	de Nigris 52'; Suazo 58'	Report		Referee: Francisco Chacón

September 25, 2010 Round 9	Atlas	1 – 0	Puebla	Estadio Jalisco, Guadalajara
8:45pm	Moreno 13'	Report		Referee: Jorge Macías Romo

October 3, 2010 Round 10	Guadalajara	2 – 2	Atlas	Estadio Omnilife, Zapopan
4:30pm	Ponce 31'; Vidrio 90' (o.g.)	Report	Santos 24'; Flores 76'	Referee: Roberto García

October 9, 2010 Round 11	Atlas	2 – 1	San Luis	Estadio Jalisco, Guadalajara
8:45pm	Moreno 24'; Espinoza 90+3' (pen.)	Report	Ponce 76'	Referee: Mauricio Morales

October 15, 2010 Round 12	Estudiantes Tecos	2 – 1	Atlas	Estadio Tres de Marzo, Zapopan
8:00pm	Medina 18'; Ochoa 80'	Report	Santos 24'	Referee: Armando Archundia

October 23, 2010 Round 13	Atlas	3 – 1	Atlante	Estadio Jalisco, Guadalajara
8:45pm	Moreno 20' (pen.), 70'; Espinoza 48'	Report	Bermúdez 59'	Referee: Marco Antonio Rodríguez

October 26, 2010 Round 14	UNAM	1 – 1	Atlas	Estadio Olímpico Universitario, Mexico City
9:00pm	Cacho 55'	Report	Pacheco 84'	Referee: Ricardo Arellano

October 30, 2010 Round 15	Atlas	1 – 2	Pachuca	Estadio Jalisco, Guadalajara
8:45pm	Moreno 28'	Report	Manso 31'; Cvitanich 73'	Referee: Roberto García

November 6, 2010 Round 16	Chiapas	2 – 1	Atlas	Estadio Victor Manuel Reyna, Tuxtla Gutierrez
5:00pm	Razo 13'; Martínez 74'	Report	Fuentes 59'	Referee: Jaime Herrera

November 13, 2010 Round 17	Atlas	2 – 2	UANL	Estadio Jalisco, Guadalajara
8:45pm	Moreno 39' (pen.), 63' (pen.)	Report	Lobos 15'; Batista 30'	Referee: Francisco Chacón

== Goalscorers ==
Position	Nation	Name	Goals scored
1.	(Argentina)	Alfredo Moreno	7
2.	(Argentina)	Fabricio Fuentes	3
3.	(Mexico)	Gerardo Espinoza	2
3.	(Mexico)	Flavio Santos	2
5.	(Mexico)	Gerardo Flores	1
5.	(Mexico)	Edgar Iván Pacheco	1
5.	(Mexico)	Gregorio Torres	1
5.	(Mexico)	Néstor Vidrio	1
TOTAL			18

=== Results ===
==== Results summary ====
Overall								Home						Away					
Pld	W	D	L	GF	GA	GD	Pts	W	D	L	GF	GA	GD	W	D	L	GF	GA	GD
17	3	4	10	18	27	−9	13	3	1	4	10	11	−1	0	3	6	8	16	−8

Last updated: 29 January 2011.
Source: Apertura 2010 results

==== Results by round ====
Round	1	2	3	4	5	6	7	8	9	10	11	12	13	14	15	16	17
Ground	A	A	H	A	H	A	H	A	H	A	H	A	H	A	H	A	H
Result	L	L	L	D	L	L	L	L	W	D	W	L	W	D	L	L	D
Position	15	16	16	16	18	18	18	18	18	18	17	18	17	16	17	18	18

Updated to match(es) played on 29 January 2011. Source: Apertura 2010 results and mediotiempo.com
A = Away; H = Home; W = Win; D = Draw; L = Loss

== Torneo Clausura ==
=== Squad ===
Note: Flags indicate national team as defined under FIFA eligibility rules; some limited exceptions apply. Players may hold more than one non-FIFA nationality.

No.	Pos.	Nation	Player
1	GK	MEX	José Francisco Canales
2	DF	COL	Wilman Conde
3	DF	MEX	Néstor Vidrio (Vice-Captain)
4	DF	MEX	Luis Robles
5	DF	MEX	Ricardo Jiménez
6	MF	MEX	Gerardo Espinoza (Captain)
7	DF	MEX	Alfredo González Tahuilán
8	FW	COL	Michael Ortega
9	MF	MEX	Hebert Alférez
10	FW	ARG	Alfredo Moreno
11	FW	MEX	Daniel Osorno
12	FW	MEX	Daniel Arreola
13	FW	HON	Carlo Costly

No.	Pos.	Nation	Player
14	MF	MEX	César Ibáñez
15	DF	MEX	Gerardo Flores
16	DF	MEX	Alonso Zamora
17	MF	ARG	Lucas Ayala
18	MF	MEX	Jesús Arturo Paganoni
20	MF	MEX	Christian Díaz
21	GK	MEX	Alejandro Gallardo
22	MF	MEX	Edgar Iván Pacheco
24	GK	CHI	Miguel Pinto
26	FW	MEX	Flavio Santos
27	DF	MEX	Hugo Rodríguez
28	MF	BRA	Lucio Flavio dos Santos
30	DF	MEX	Dárvin Chávez

Out on loan: Note: Flags indicate national team as defined under FIFA eligibility rules; some limited exceptions apply. Players may hold more than one non-FIFA nationality.

No. / Pos. / Nation / Player; — / FW / BRA / Rômulo (loan to Guarani)	No. / Pos. / Nation / Player; — / FW / URU / Gonzalo Vargas (loan to Argentinos Juniors)

=== Season results ===
==== Regular season ====
January 8, 2011 Round 1	Atlas	5 – 0	Morelia	Estadio Jalisco, Guadalajara
8:45pm	Espinoza 27', 70'; Conde 41'; Diaz 58'; Osorno 80'	Report		Referee: Roberto García

January 15, 2011 Round 2	Atlas	2 – 1	Querétaro	Estadio Jalisco, Guadalajara
8:45pm	Pacheco 37'; Moreno 81'	Report	Bueno 49'	Referee: Jaime Herrera

January 21, 2011 Round 3	Necaxa	0 – 1	Atlas	Estadio Victoria, Aguascalientes
8:10pm		Report	Moreno 72'	Referee: Fabricio Morales

January 29, 2011 Round 4	Atlas	0 – 2	América	Estadio Jalisco, Guadalajara
8:45pm		Report	Vuoso 70'; Reyna 84'	Referee: Jorge Eduardo Gasso

February 6, 2011 Round 5	Toluca	0 – 0	Atlas	Estadio Nemesio Díez, Toluca
12:00pm		Report		Referee: Marco Antonio Rodríguez

February 12, 2011 Round 6	Atlas	1 –2	Santos Laguna	Estadio Jalisco, Guadalajara
8:45pm	Conde 56'	report	Arce 36'; Rodríguez 38' (pen.)	Referee: Francisco Chacón

February 19, 2011 Round 7	Cruz Azul	2 – 1	Atlas	Estadio Azul, Mexico City
5:00pm	Villa 2'; Romo 90+3'	Report	Santos 73'	Referee: Miguel Ángel Flores

February 26, 2011 Round 8	Atlas	1 – 0	Monterrey	Estadio Jalisco, Guadalajara
8:45pm	Espinoza 45+2'	Report		Referee: Paul Delgadillo

March 6, 2011 Round 9	Puebla	2 – 0	Atlas	Estadio Cuauhtémoc, Puebla
12:00pm	Lugo 2', 65'	Report		Referee: Roberto García Orozco

March 12, 2011 Round 10	Atlas	1 – 1	Guadalajara	Estadio Jalisco, Guadalajara
8:45pm	Santos 66'	Report	Torres 11'	Referee: Ricardo Arellano

March 19, 2011 Round 11	San Luis	1 – 1	Atlas	Estadio Alfonso Lastras, San Luis Potosí
8:45pm	Aguirre 78'	Report	Ortega 89'	Referee: Jaime Herrera

April 2, 2011 Round 12	Atlas	1 – 1	Estudiantes Tecos	Estadio Jalisco, Guadalajara
8:45pm	Costly 39'	Report	Cejas 27'	Referee: Miguel Ángel Ortega

April 9, 2011 Round 13	Atlante	3 – 1	Atlas	Estadio Quintana Roo, Cancún
9:00pm	Foinseca 10'; Pinto 54' (o.g.); Maldonado 75'	Report	Costly 89'	Referee: Paul Delgadillo

April 13, 2011 Round 14	Atlas	0 – 0	UNAM	Estadio Jalisco, Guadalajara
8:45pm		Report		Referee: Juan Genaro Medrano

April 16, 2011 Round 15	Pachuca	1 – 2	Atlas	Estadio Hidalgo, Pachuca
7:00pm	Anchico 8'	Report	Moreno 71', 87'	Referee: Erim Ramírez

April 23, 2011 Round 16	Atlas	2 – 0	Chiapas	Estadio Jalisco, Guadalajara
8:45pm	Jiménez 21'; Barraza 74'	Report		Referee: Ricardo Arellano

April 30, 2011 Round 17	UANL	3 – 0	Atlas	Estadio Universitario, San Nicolás
7:00pm	Mancilla 5'; Lobos 46'; Pulido 89'	Report		Referee: Francisco Chacón

=== Goalscorers ===
Position	Nation	Name	Goals scored
1.	(Argentina)	Alfredo Moreno	4
2.	(Mexico)	Gerardo Espinoza	3
3.	(Mexico)	Flavio Santos	2
3.	(Colombia)	Wilman Conde	2
3.	(Honduras)	Carlo Costly	2
6.	(Mexico)	Jahir Alejandro Barraza	1
6.	(Mexico)	Christian Díaz	1
6.	(Mexico)	Ricardo Jiménez	1
6.	(Mexico)	Daniel Osorno	1
6.	(Colombia)	Michael Ortega	1
6.	(Mexico)	Edgar Pacheco	1
TOTAL			19

=== Results ===
==== Results summary ====
Overall								Home						Away					
Pld	W	D	L	GF	GA	GD	Pts	W	D	L	GF	GA	GD	W	D	L	GF	GA	GD
17	6	5	6	19	19	0	23	4	3	2	13	7	+6	2	2	4	6	12	−6

Last updated: 6 May 2011.
Source: Clausura 2011 results

==== Results by round ====
Round	1	2	3	4	5	6	7	8	9	10	11	12	13	14	15	16	17
Ground	H	H	A	H	A	H	A	H	A	H	A	H	A	H	A	H	A
Result	W	W	W	L	D	L	L	W	L	D	D	D	L	D	W	W	L
Position	1	1	1	1	4	6	8	5	8	9	11	10	11	11	10	7	10

Updated to match(es) played on 16 May 2011. Source: Clausura 2011 results and mediotiempo.com
A = Away; H = Home; W = Win; D = Draw; L = Loss
