= 2009 Club Atlas season =

Atlas
Apertura 2009 season
- Manager: Ricardo La Volpe
- Stadium: Jalisco, Guadalajara, Jalisco
Home colours	Away colours	Third colours

F.C. Atlas debuted the Apertura 2009 on July 25, 2009, with a 1–0 win over Pumas.

== Summer transfers ==
In: Note: Flags indicate national team as defined under FIFA eligibility rules; some limited exceptions apply. Players may hold more than one non-FIFA nationality.

No.	Pos.	Nation	Player
7	MF	MEX	Gerardo Espinoza (Loan return from Atlante)
27	DF	MEX	Omar Trujillo (Loan from Morelia)
10	FW	MEX	Daniel Osorno (Loan from Puebla)
14	DF	MEX	Mario Pérez (Loan from Necaxa)
29	DF	MEX	Mario Méndez (Loan from Toluca)
18	MF	MEX	Miguel Zepeda (Loan from Santos Laguna)
7	FW	ARG	Daniel Rios (From Toluca)
1	GK	ARG	Mariano Barbosa (From River Plate)

Out: Note: Flags indicate national team as defined under FIFA eligibility rules; some limited exceptions apply. Players may hold more than one non-FIFA nationality.

No.	Pos.	Nation	Player
11	FW	ARG	Bruno Marioni (Loan to Estudiantes)
7	MF	MEX	Jorge Hernández (Loan to Morelia)
--	MF	MEX	Gregorio Torres (Loan to Pachuca)
17	FW	PAR	Jorge Achucarro (Released)
--	DF	MEX	Christian Sánchez (Loan to Santos Laguna)
--	DF	MEX	Jaime Durán (Loan return to Morelia)
8	MF	MEX	Lucas Ayala (Loan return to Tigres)

== Current roster ==
Note: Flags indicate national team as defined under FIFA eligibility rules; some limited exceptions apply. Players may hold more than one non-FIFA nationality.

No.	Pos.	Nation	Player
1	GK	ARG	Mariano Barbosa
2	DF	CHI	Ismael Fuentes
3	DF	MEX	Néstor Vidrio
4	DF	MEX	Luis Robles
5	DF	MEX	Ricardo Jiménez
6	MF	MEX	Gerardo Espinoza
7	FW	ARG	Daniel Ríos
8	DF	MEX	Jorge Torres Nilo
9	FW	URU	Gonzalo Vargas
10	MF	ARG	Darío Bottinelli
11	FW	MEX	Daniel Osorno
12	GK	MEX	José Francisco Canales
14	DF	MEX	Mario Pérez
15	MF	MEX	Jesus Arturo Paganoni
16	DF	MEX	Hugo Ayala (captain)

No.	Pos.	Nation	Player
17	DF	MEX	Alonso Zamora
18	MF	MEX	Miguel Zepeda
19	MF	MEX	Saúl Villalobos
20	FW	MEX	Hebert Alférez
21	MF	MEX	Sergio Vizcarra
22	MF	MEX	Edgar Pacheco
23	DF	MEX	Eduardo Rergis
24	GK	MEX	Alejandro Gallardo
25	MF	MEX	Carlos Alberto Gutiérrez
26	FW	MEX	Flavio Santos
27	DF	MEX	Omar Trujillo
28	MF	MEX	Diego Campos
29	DF	MEX	Mario Méndez
30	DF	MEX	Dárvin Chávez
34	GK	MEX	Florencio Morán

== Statistics ==
Nat	No	Player	Pos	Starts	Apps	G	A	Booked	Sent off (straight red)
(Chile)	2	Ismael Fuentes	DF	9	9	2	0	6	0
(Mexico)	3	Néstor Vidrio	DF	5	6	0	0	1	0
(Mexico)	4	Luis Robles	DF	9	9	0	0	1	0
(Mexico)	5	Ricardo Jiménez de Alba	DF	1	1	0	0	0	0
(Mexico)	6	Gerardo Espinoza	MF	8	11	2	0	3	0
(Argentina)	7	Daniel Ríos	FW	2	6	0	0	0	0
(Mexico)	8	Jorge Torres Nilo	DF	5	8	0	1	1	1
(Uruguay)	9	Gonzalo Vargas	FW	7	9	0	0	2	0
(Argentina)	10	Dario Botinelli	MF	6	7	0	2	5	0
(Mexico)	11	Daniel Osorno	FW	11	11	0	3	2	0
(Mexico)	14	Mario Pérez	DF	1	6	0	1	0	0
(Mexico)	15	Jesus Arturo Paganoni	MF	0	0	0	0	0	0
(Mexico)	16	Hugo Ayala	DF	11	11	0	0	2	0
(Mexico)	18	Miguel Zepeda	MF	3	6	0	0	0	0
(Mexico)	20	Herbert Alferez	FW	2	4	0	0	1	0
(Mexico)	22	Edgar Ivan Pacheco	MF	8	8	2	1	1	0
(Mexico)	23	Eduardo Rergis	DF	0	0	0	0	0	0
(Mexico)	27	Omar Trujillo	DF	0	3	0	0	0	0
(Mexico)	28	Diego Campos	DF	0	1	0	0	0	0
(Mexico)	29	Mario Méndez	DF	11	11	0	0	3	0
(Mexico)	30	Darvin Chavez	DF	10	10	0	0	5	1
(Mexico)	43	Christian Diaz	DF	0	2	0	0	0	0

== Goalkeepers ==
Nat	No	Player	Pos	Starts	Apps	GA	GAA	CS	Booked	Sent off (straight red)
(Argentina)	1	Mariano Barbosa	GK	4	4	4	1.0	1	1	0
(Mexico)	12	Jose Francisco Canales	GK	1	1	3	3.0	0	0	0

== 2009 Mexico Apertura ==
Atlas debuted the Apertura 2009 with a 1–0 victory over Pumas. Atlas showed a great performance in the first half. At the 45' minute marked the first goal of the game and season for Atlas, scored by Edgar Ivan Pacheco with a header, assisted by a long pass from Daniel Osorno. Apertura 2009 will be coached by Ricardo La Volpe.

Jornada 2, Atlas visited Monterrey. A poor performance by Atlas led them to lose to Monterrey 3–0. Goals scored by Monterrey were an own goal by Edgar Pacheco, Sergio Santana, and Humberto Suazo. Atlas' defense left many open spots in the defense which led Monterrey to shoot many shots. Canales was a huge factor in Monterrey's third, in which he came out and ended up leaving the goal, open.

Jornada 3, Atlas at home takes a 2–1 victory over Santos. Atlas with a much better improvements from last week. On Atlas' side, Ismael Fuentes scored the first on a corner, passed by Dario Botinelli. Gerardo Espinoza scored a very well goal. Dario Botinelli with a long pass for Daniel Osorno who makes a fast run for the ball and then re-passes the ball into the area where Espinoza gets the ball and shoots into the far angle of the goal. For Santos, Juan Carlos Mosqueda scored, but it wasn't enough for Atlas won.

Jornada 4, Atlas loses against the home team America. Atlas showed some poor performances on the defense. Now starting to show in need of a forward. Cabanas scored first for Club América with a very good goal, with errors by Hugo Ayala and Luis Robles. Atlas tied the game with a corner by Edgar Pacheco and Fuentes scores with a hard header and injures himself by bumping his head into Mosquera's head. Second Half, America again taking the lead. After a shot bounced off the crossbar, Beausejour picks up the ball and scores on Barbosa with a weak shot. Atlas had chances to score like a shot by Botinelli in which goalkeeper Guillermo Ochoa blocks and hits the crossbar. Another good opportunity by Pacheco which hits the crossbar as well.

Jornada 5, Atlas takes a loss at home against Morelia, 2–0. Sabah scored 2 goals for Morelia. Atlas, who showed great work on the field, but made few mistakes in which Morelia capitalized in.

Jornada 6, Atlas takes an away tie, 1–1 with Indios. It was a well-deserved result. Both sides gave their all and Pacheco scored a header, assisted by Mario Pérez. Indios scored a penalty, which was kicked by Edwin Santibanez.

=== Group standings ===
Group 1
Pos	Team	Pld	W	D	L	GF	GA	GD	Pts	Qualification
1	Toluca	17	11	2	4	32	19	+13	35	Advances to the Final Phase
2	San Luis	17	5	6	6	21	24	−3	21	Advances to the Final Phase
3	Guadalajara	17	5	4	8	23	29	−6	19	
4	Atlas	17	5	3	9	14	25	−11	18	
5	Querétaro	17	5	3	9	17	29	−12	18	
6	Ciudad Juárez	17	0	6	11	7	26	−19	6	

=== Top 3 goalscorers ===
Rank	Player	Club	Goals
1	(Chile) Ismael Fuentes	Atlas	2
1	(Mexico) Edgar Pacheco	Atlas	2
2	(Mexico) Gerardo Espinoza	Atlas	1
