= 2014–15 NK Zadar season =

Zadar
2014–15 season
- Chairman: Josip Bajlo
- Manager: Ferdo Milin (until 24 August 2014); Miroslav Blažević (until 2 January 2015); Igor Štimac
- Prva HNL: 10th (relegated)
- Croatian Cup: Quarter-finals
- Top goalscorer: League: Ivan Krstanović (6); All: Krstanović, Pešić (6)
- Highest home attendance: 3,500 v Hajduk Split, 2 November 2014
- Lowest home attendance: 200 v Lokomotiva, 6 December 2014
Home colours	Away colours

The 2014–15 season was the 70th season in Zadar’s history and their eighth in the Prva HNL. Their 7th place finish in the 2013–14 season means it is their 18th successive season playing in the Prva HNL. On December 2, 2014 the main chairman of NK Zadar Reno Sinovčić was arrested on grounds of corruption.

== First-team squad ==
As of 2 March 2015

Note: Flags indicate national team as defined under FIFA eligibility rules; some limited exceptions apply. Players may hold more than one non-FIFA nationality.

No.	Pos.	Nation	Player
1	GK	CRO	Mladen Matković
2	MF	CRO	Josip Bilaver
3	FW	CRO	Lovre Čirjak
4	MF	CRO	Ante Sarić
5	FW	CRO	Ivan Jovanović
6	DF	CRO	Vedran Ješe
7	MF	CRO	Domagoj Pušić (on loan from Rijeka)
8	MF	CRO	Jakov Surać
9	FW	CRO	Andrija Milinković
10	MF	CRO	Drago Gabrić (on loan from Rijeka)
11	FW	NGA	Solomon Theophilus (on loan from Rijeka)
12	GK	CRO	Tomo Gluić
14	MF	CRO	Frane Čirjak
15	DF	CRO	Jure Jerbić (captain)

No.	Pos.	Nation	Player
16	MF	CRO	Ivan Pešić
17	FW	NGA	Aliyu Okechukwu (on loan from Rijeka)
19	MF	CRO	Domagoj Krajačić
20	FW	BIH	Želimir Terkeš
21	MF	CRO	Domagoj Muić
22	MF	CRO	Marko Tešija
23	DF	CRO	Roberto Viduka
25	DF	CRO	Frane Ikić
26	DF	CRO	Darko Mišić
28	DF	BIH	Mirko Hrgović
30	DF	CRO	Jurica Buljat
99	FW	BIH	Ivan Krstanović
—	MF	CRO	Tonći Mujan (on loan from Hajduk)
—	FW	CRO	Dražen Pilčić

== Competitions ==
=== Overall ===
Competition	Started round	Final result	First match	Last Match
2014–15 Prva HNL	–	10th (relegated)	19 July	30 May
2014–15 Croatian Football Cup	First round	Quarter-finals	24 September	4 March

=== Prva HNL ===
==== Classification ====
Pos	Team	Pld	W	D	L	GF	GA	GD	Pts	Qualification or relegation
6	Slaven Belupo	36	11	9	16	38	49	−11	42	
7	RNK Split	36	9	14	13	42	49	−7	41	
8	Osijek	36	10	6	20	42	59	−17	36	
9	Istra 1961	36	7	14	15	36	59	−23	35	Qualification to relegation play-off
10	Zadar (R)	36	8	8	20	37	75	−38	32	Relegation to Croatian Second Football League

Source: Sportnet.hr
Rules for classification: 1) points; 2) goal difference; 3) number of goals scored.
For deciding champions, qualification to UEFA Europa League and relegation: 1st points; 2nd head-to-head points; 3rd head-to-head goal difference; 4th head-to-head away goals scored
(R) Relegated

==== Results summary ====
Overall								Home						Away					
Pld	W	D	L	GF	GA	GD	Pts	W	D	L	GF	GA	GD	W	D	L	GF	GA	GD
36	8	8	20	37	75	−38	32	6	4	8	24	26	−2	2	4	12	13	49	−36

Last updated: 30 May 2015.
Source: Sportnet.hr

==== Results by round ====
Round	1	2	3	4	5	6	7	8	9	10	11	12	13	14	15	16	17	18	19	20	21	22	23	24	25	26	27	28	29	30	31	32	33	34	35	36
Ground	H	H	A	H	A	H	A	H	A	A	A	H	A	H	A	H	A	H	H	H	A	H	A	H	A	H	A	A	A	H	A	H	A	H	A	H
Result	L	W	L	D	L	D	L	W	W	L	L	L	L	L	D	L	L	L	D	W	L	L	D	W	L	W	W	D	L	L	L	W	D	L	L	D
Position	7	5	8	6	9	9	9	9	5	7	9	9	9	9	10	10	10	10	10	10	9	10	10	9	10	9	8	9	10	10	10	10	9	10	10	10

Source: Competitive matches
A = Away; H = Home; W = Win; D = Draw; L = Loss

== Matches ==
=== Prva HNL ===
Round	Date	Venue	Opponent	Score	Attendance	Zadar Scorers	Report
1	19 Jul	H	RNK Split	1 – 2	1,000	Ivančić	Semafor.hns.family
2	26 Jul	H	Osijek	2 – 1	900	Ivančić, Weitzer	Semafor.hns.family
3	2 Aug	A	Dinamo Zagreb	0 – 5	1,976		Semafor.hns.family
4	9 Aug	H	NK Zagreb	2 – 2	1,200	Weitzer, Ivančić	Semafor.hns.family
5	16 Aug	A	Hajduk Split	0 – 6	10,000		Semafor.hns.family
6	23 Aug	H	Istra 1961	1 – 1	800	Šimurina	Semafor.hns.family
7	30 Aug	A	Rijeka	1 – 6	4,000	Terkeš	Semafor.hns.family
8	14 Sep	H	Slaven Belupo	4 – 0	3,000	Terkeš, Pešić, Hrgović, Pušić	Semafor.hns.family
9	19 Sep	A	Lokomotiva	1 – 0	1,000	Weitzer	Semafor.hns.family
10	29 Sep	A	RNK Split	0 – 3	1,000		Semafor.hns.family
11	4 Oct	A	Osijek	1 – 4	2,000	Ikić	Semafor.hns.family
12	18 Oct	H	Dinamo Zagreb	1 – 3	2,500	Pešić	Semafor.hns.family
13	24 Oct	A	NK Zagreb	0 – 3	200		Semafor.hns.family
14	2 Nov	H	Hajduk Split	0 – 3	3,500		Semafor.hns.family
15	8 Nov	A	Istra 1961	1 – 1	800	Buljat	Semafor.hns.family
16	22 Nov	H	Rijeka	0 – 1	1,500		Semafor.hns.family
17	29 Nov	A	Slaven Belupo	0 – 4	1,200		Semafor.hns.family
18	6 Dec	H	Lokomotiva	2 – 5	200	Theophilus, Buljat	Semafor.hns.family
19	12 Dec	H	RNK Split	1 – 1	500	Jerbić	Semafor.hns.family
20	7 Feb	H	Osijek	3 – 1	2,000	Pešić, L. Čirjak, Banović	Semafor.hns.family
21	14 Feb	A	Dinamo Zagreb	0 – 2	941		Semafor.hns.family
22	21 Feb	H	NK Zagreb	0 – 1	1,000		Semafor.hns.family
23	1 Mar	A	Hajduk Split	2 – 2	7,000	Gabrić, L. Čirjak	Semafor.hns.family
24	8 Mar	H	Istra 1961	2 – 0	800	Krstanović, L. Čirjak	Semafor.hns.family
25	14 Mar	A	Rijeka	0 – 4	5,200		Semafor.hns.family
26	21 Mar	H	Slaven Belupo	1 – 0	500	Jerbić	Semafor.hns.family
27	4 Apr	A	Lokomotiva	5 – 1	500	Gabrić, Bartolec (o.g.), Krstanović (3)	Semafor.hns.family
28	11 Apr	A	RNK Split	1 – 1	600	Jerbić	Semafor.hns.family
29	18 Apr	A	Osijek	1 – 2	4,500	Pešić	Semafor.hns.family
30	25 Apr	H	Dinamo Zagreb	0 – 1	2,000		Semafor.hns.family
31	29 Apr	A	NK Zagreb	0 – 3	1,000		Semafor.hns.family
32	2 May	H	Hajduk Split	2 – 0	3,500	Ikić, Krstanović	Semafor.hns.family
33	9 May	A	Istra 1961	0 – 0	3,700		Semafor.hns.family
34	16 May	H	Rijeka	0 – 2	1,500		Semafor.hns.family
35	23 May	A	Slaven Belupo	0 – 2	500		Semafor.hns.family
36	30 May	H	Lokomotiva	2 – 2	1,500	Krstanović, Anić	Semafor.hns.family

=== Croatian Cup ===
Round	Date	Venue	Opponent	Score	Attendance	Zadar Scorers	Report
R1	24 Sep	A	Zagora Unešić	5 – 1	1,500	Weitzer, Theophilus (3), Hrgović	Semafor.hns.family
R2	29 Oct	H	Varaždin	5 – 1	400	Pešić (2), Terkeš, F. Čirjak, Ješe	Semafor.hns.family
QF	11 Feb	A	RNK Split	0 – 1	500		Semafor.hns.family
QF	4 Mar	H	RNK Split	1 – 4	1,000	L. Čirjak	Semafor.hns.family

Sources: Prva-HNL.hr

=== Friendlies ===
Round	Date	Venue	Opponent	Score	Attendance	Zadar Scorers	Report
1	20 Jan 2015	(Croatian Republic of Herzeg-Bosnia) Međugorje	NK Neretva	2 – 2	50	Muja, Jerbić (o.g.), Čirjak (o.g.), Gabrić	zadarski.hr
2	24 Jan 2015	(Croatian Republic of Herzeg-Bosnia) Međugorje	(Croatian Republic of Herzeg-Bosnia) Zrinjski	0 – 2	100	-	Sportnet.hr

== Player seasonal records ==
Competitive matches only. Updated to games played 15 December 2014.

=== Goals ===
Rank	Name	League	Cup	Total
1	(Bosnia and Herzegovina) Ivan Krstanović	6	0	6
1	(Croatia) Ivan Pešić	4	2	6
3	(Croatia) Lovre Čirjak	3	1	4
3	(Croatia) Ivor Weitzer	3	1	4
3	(Nigeria) Theophilus Solomon	1	3	4
7	(Croatia) Josip Ivančić	3	0	3
7	(Croatia) Jure Jerbić	3	0	3
7	(Bosnia and Herzegovina) Želimir Terkeš	2	1	3
10	(Croatia) Jurica Buljat	2	0	2
10	(Croatia) Drago Gabrić	2	0	2
10	(Croatia) Mirko Hrgović	1	1	2
10	(Croatia) Frane Ikić	2	0	2
14	(Croatia) Josip Anić	1	0	1
14	(Croatia) Igor Banović	1	0	1
14	(Croatia) Frane Čirjak	0	1	1
14	(Croatia) Vedran Ješe	0	1	1
14	(Croatia) Domagoj Pušić	1	0	1
14	(Croatia) Ivan Šimurina	1	0	1
14	TOTALS	37	11	48

Source: Semafor.hns.family

== Transfers ==
=== In ===
Date	Position	Player	From	Fee
14 Jul 2014	CF	(Croatia) Vlatko Šimunac	(Croatia) NK Vinogradar	Free
14 Jul 2014	CF	(Bosnia and Herzegovina) Želimir Terkeš	(Indonesia) Persija Jakarta	?
21 Jul 2014	MF	(Croatia) Marko Tešija	(Croatia) Dugopolje	?
24 Jun 2014	FW	(Croatia) Lovre Čirjak	Unemployed	
10 Oct 2014	AM	(Croatia) Jurica Buljat	Unemployed	
14 Jan 2015	FW	(Croatia) Dražen Pilčić	Unemployed	Free
		(Croatia) Domagoj Krajačić	(Croatia) NK Lučko	
		(Croatia) Andrija Milinković	(Croatia) NK Neretva	

=== Out ===
Date	Position	Player	To	Fee
1 Jul 2014	FW	(Croatia) Antonio Jakoliš	(Romania) CFR Cluj	Free transfer
1 Jul 2014	FW	(Croatia) Marin Jurina	(Luxembourg) Etzella	?
18 Jul 2014	DF	(Croatia) Marin Oršulić	(Bulgaria) CSKA Sofia	?
18 Aug 2014	MF	(Croatia) Josip Bašić	(Croatia) HNK Šibenik	?
18 Aug 2014	DF	(Croatia) Marin Con	(Kuwait) Al-Fahaheel FC	?
25 Aug 2014	FW	(Croatia) Josip Ivančić	(Croatia) HNK Rijeka	?
30 Jun 2014	FW	(Croatia) Josip Tadić	(Croatia) HNK Rijeka	End of loan
15 Jun 2014	DF	(Croatia) Mato Neretljak	(Croatia) HNK Rijeka	End of loan
21 Oct 2014	MF	(Croatia) Marko Tešija	Unattached	?
4 Nov 2014	MF	(Croatia) Andjelo Paleka	(Croatia) NK Zlatna Luka	?
13 Jan 2015	MF	(Croatia) Ivor Weitzer	(Hungary) Pécsi MFC	?

=== Loans in ===
Date	Position	Player	From	Until
18 Aug 2014	MF	(Croatia) Domagoj Pušić	(Croatia) HNK Rijeka	30 Jun 2015
22 Aug 2014	FW	(Nigeria) Solomon Theophilus	(Croatia) HNK Rijeka	30 Jun 2015
14 Jan 2015	MF	(Nigeria) Aliyu Okechukwu	(Croatia) HNK Rijeka	30 Jun 2015
15 Jan 2015	MF	(Croatia) Drago Gabrić	(Croatia) HNK Rijeka	30 Jun 2015
15 Jan 2015	MF	(Croatia) Tonći Mujan	(Croatia) HNK Hajduk Split	30 Jun 2015

=== Loans out ===
Date	Position	Player	To	Until
12 Aug 2014	FW	(Croatia) Vlatko Blažević	(Croatia) HNK Šibenik	30 Jun 2015
