= 2011–12 HNK Rijeka season =

Rijeka
2011–12 season
- Chairman: Robert Komen, Damir Mišković (from 20 March 2012)
- Manager: Alen Horvat, Ivo Ištuk, Dragan Skočić, Elvis Scoria
- Stadium: Stadion Kantrida
- Prva HNL: 12th
- Croatian Cup: Quarter-final
- Top goalscorer: League: Damir Kreilach (9); All: Damir Kreilach (9)
- Highest home attendance: 6,000 v Hajduk Split (21 March 2011)
- Lowest home attendance: 800 v NK Zagreb (7 April 2011)
- Average home league attendance: 2,450
Home colours	Away colours

The 2011–12 season was the 66th season in Rijeka's history. It was their 21st season in the Prva HNL and 38th successive top tier season.

== Competitions ==
Competition	First match	Last match	Starting round	Final position	Record							
Competition	First match	Last match	Starting round	Final position	G	W	D	L	GF	GA	GD	Win %
Prva HNL	22 July 2011	12 May 2012	Matchday 1	12th	30	9	11	10	29	29	+0	30.00
Croatian Cup	21 September 2011	30 November 2011	First round	Quarterfinal	4	2	0	2	4	5	−1	50.00
Total					34	11	11	12	33	34	−1	32.35

=== Prva HNL ===
==== Classification ====
Pos	Team	Pld	W	D	L	GF	GA	GD	Pts	Qualification or relegation
10	Zadar	30	11	7	12	29	44	−15	40	
11	Inter Zaprešić	30	11	5	14	33	33	0	38	
12	Rijeka	30	9	11	10	29	29	0	38	
13	Lučko (R)	30	6	13	11	29	36	−7	31	Relegation to Croatian Second Football League
14	Šibenik (R)	30	6	9	15	27	39	−12	27	Relegation to Croatian Second Football League

Source: Sportnet.hr
Rules for classification: 1) points; 2) goal difference; 3) number of goals scored.
For deciding champions, qualification to UEFA Europa League and relegation: 1st points; 2nd head-to-head points; 3rd head-to-head goal difference; 4th head-to-head away goals scored
(R) Relegated

==== Results summary ====
Overall								Home						Away					
Pld	W	D	L	GF	GA	GD	Pts	W	D	L	GF	GA	GD	W	D	L	GF	GA	GD
30	9	11	10	29	29	0	38	7	5	3	14	8	+6	2	6	7	15	21	−6

==== Results by round ====
Round	1	2	3	4	5	6	7	8	9	10	11	12	13	14	15	16	17	18	19	20	21	22	23	24	25	26	27	28	29	30
Ground	A	H	A	H	A	H	A	A	H	A	H	A	H	A	H	H	A	H	A	H	A	H	H	A	H	A	H	A	H	A
Result	D	W	L	W	D	W	D	L	D	L	W	L	D	L	W	W	D	L	W	D	D	L	W	D	L	L	D	L	D	W
Position	7	3	7	6	6	5	7	8	7	8	8	8	8	9	8	6	7	9	7	8	8	11	7	7	10	11	11	12	11	12

Source: Competitive matches
A = Away; H = Home; W = Win; D = Draw; L = Loss

== Matches ==
=== Prva HNL ===
Round	Date	Venue	Opponent	Score	Attendance	Rijeka Scorers	Report
1	22 Jul	A	Osijek	1 – 1	1,500	Dedić	HRnogomet.com
2	30 Jul	H	Lučko	1 – 0	2,500	Kreilach	HRnogomet.com
3	7 Aug	A	Hajduk Split	1 – 2	10,000	Švrljuga	HRnogomet.com
4	13 Aug	H	Varaždin	2 – 0	2,500	Kreilach, Švrljuga	HRnogomet.com
5	19 Aug	A	Lokomotiva	0 – 0	1,000		HRnogomet.com
6	26 Aug	H	Šibenik	1 – 0	4,000	Kreilach	HRnogomet.com
7	11 Sep	A	Zadar	4 – 4	1,600	Čulina, Alférez, Čaval, Gutiérrez	HRnogomet.com
8	16 Sep	A	Inter Zaprešić	0 – 1	500		HRnogomet.com
9	24 Sep	H	Istra 1961	0 – 0	3,000		HRnogomet.com
10	30 Sep	A	Zagreb	1 – 2	1,200	Salčinović	HRnogomet.com
11	16 Oct	H	RNK Split	2 – 0	2,500	Križman, Stepčić	HRnogomet.com
12	22 Oct	A	Dinamo Zagreb	0 – 2	2,000		HRnogomet.com
13	29 Oct	H	Cibalia	1 – 1	1,500	Salčinović	HRnogomet.com
14	4 Nov	A	Slaven Belupo	0 – 1	1,000		HRnogomet.com
15	20 Nov	H	Karlovac	3 – 0 (Note: Karlovac failed to appear for the match, which was later awarded as a 3–0 forfeit win to Rijeka)	–	–	HRnogomet.com
16	26 Nov	H	Osijek	1 – 0	1,000	Kreilach	HRnogomet.com
17	3 Dec	AR	Lučko	1 – 1	150	Mance	HRnogomet.com
19	24 Feb	A	Varaždin	3 – 0 (Note: Varaždin was expelled so the match was awarded as a 3–0 forfeit win to Rijeka)	–	–	HRnogomet.com
20	4 Mar	H	Lokomotiva	0 – 0	3,000		HRnogomet.com
21	9 Mar	A	Šibenik	2 – 2	1,000	Kreilach (2)	HRnogomet.com
22	18 Mar	H	Zadar	0 – 1	2,000		HRnogomet.com
18	21 Mar	H	Hajduk Split	0 – 3	6,000		HRnogomet.com
23	25 Mar	H	Inter Zaprešić	1 – 0	1,500	Kreilach	HRnogomet.com
25	7 Apr	H	Zagreb	0 – 1	800		HRnogomet.com
24	11 Apr	A	Istra 1961	0 – 0	2,500		HRnogomet.com
26	14 Apr	A	RNK Split	0 – 2	400		HRnogomet.com
27	21 Apr	H	Dinamo Zagreb	1 – 1	3,000	Kreilach	HRnogomet.com
28	29 Apr	A	Cibalia	0 – 2	800		HRnogomet.com
29	6 May	H	Slaven Belupo	1 – 1	3,000	Čulina	HRnogomet.com
30	12 May	A	Karlovac	2 – 1	700	Močinić, Kreilach	HRnogomet.com

Source: HRnogomet.com

=== Croatian Cup ===
Round	Date	Venue	Opponent	Score	Attendance	Rijeka Scorers	Report
R1	21 Sep	A	BSK Bijelo Brdo	2 – 1	1,500	Salčinović, Alférez	HRnogomet.com
R2	25 Oct	H	Inter Zaprešić	1 – 0	1,200	Salčinović	HRnogomet.com
QF	23 Nov	H	Osijek	1 – 2	1,500	Alférez	HRnogomet.com
QF	30 Nov	A	Osijek	0 – 2	600		HRnogomet.com

Source: HRnogomet.com

=== Squad statistics ===
Competitive matches only.
Appearances in brackets indicate numbers of times the player came on as a substitute.

Name	Apps	Goals	Apps	Goals	Apps	Goals
Name	League		Cup		Total	
(Croatia) Robert Lisjak	28 (0)	0	4 (0)	0	32 (0)	0
(Croatia) Andro Švrljuga	24 (0)	2	4 (0)	0	28 (0)	2
(Croatia) Igor Čagalj	25 (0)	0	4 (0)	0	29 (0)	0
(Croatia) Kristijan Čaval	19 (5)	1	0 (0)	0	19 (5)	1
(Croatia) Duje Baković	12 (0)	0	3 (0)	0	15 (0)	0
(Croatia) Niko Datković	16 (0)	0	1 (0)	0	17 (0)	0
(Bosnia and Herzegovina) Alen Dedić	9 (11)	1	3 (1)	0	12 (12)	1
(Croatia) Damir Kreilach	27 (0)	9	4 (0)	0	31 (0)	9
(Croatia) Antonini Čulina	18 (1)	2	1 (0)	0	19 (1)	2
(Bosnia and Herzegovina) Fenan Salčinović	14 (5)	2	4 (0)	2	18 (5)	4
(Mexico) Carlos Alberto Gutiérrez	13 (2)	1	4 (0)	0	17 (2)	1
(Croatia) Sandi Križman	11 (2)	1	3 (0)	0	14 (2)	1
(Croatia) Ivan Močinić	11 (2)	1	0 (0)	0	11 (2)	1
(Croatia) Mario Tadejević	11 (1)	0	4 (0)	0	15 (1)	0
(Croatia) Valentino Stepčić	3 (13)	1	1 (1)	0	4 (14)	1
(Croatia) Mato Miloš	10 (3)	0	3 (0)	0	13 (3)	0
(Croatia) Neven Vukman	9 (1)	0	0 (1)	0	9 (2)	0
(Mexico) Hebert Alférez	8 (0)	1	1 (1)	2	9 (1)	3
(Croatia) Armando Mance	4 (6)	1	0 (2)	0	4 (8)	1
(Slovenia) Uroš Palibrk	7 (2)	0	0 (0)	0	7 (2)	0
(Croatia) Diego Živulić	7 (2)	0	0 (0)	0	7 (2)	0
(Croatia) Dino Drpić	7 (0)	0	0 (0)	0	7 (0)	0
(Croatia) Dražen Pilčić	2 (5)	0	0 (1)	0	2 (6)	0
(Croatia) Alen Matovina	1 (5)	0	0 (1)	0	1 (6)	0
(Croatia) Ilija Sivonjić	3 (2)	0	0 (0)	0	3 (2)	0
(Croatia) Ivan Bošnjak	4 (0)	0	0 (0)	0	4 (0)	0
(Mexico) Luis Delgadillo	1 (3)	0	0 (1)	0	1 (4)	0
(Croatia) Denis Ljubović	1 (0)	0	0 (2)	0	1 (2)	0
(Croatia) Marin Grujević	1 (1)	0	0 (1)	0	1 (2)	0
(Croatia) Adam Sušac	1 (1)	0	0 (0)	0	1 (1)	0
(Croatia) Željko Tomić	1 (1)	0	0 (0)	0	1 (1)	0
(Slovenia) Damir Čehič	0 (1)	0	0 (0)	0	0 (1)	0

== See also ==
- 2011–12 Prva HNL
- 2011–12 Croatian Cup

== External sources ==
- 2011–12 Prva HNL at HRnogomet.com
- 2011–12 Croatian Cup at HRnogomet.com
- Prvenstvo 2011.-2012. at nk-rijeka.hr
