= Eduardo Rergis =

Eduardo Rergis may refer to:

- Eduardo Rergis (footballer, born 1956), Mexican football manager and former defender
- Eduardo Rergis (footballer, born 1980), Mexican football defender, and son of footballer born 1980
