= Daniel Ríos =

Daniel Ríos may refer to:

- Daniel Andrés Ríos (born 1983), Argentine footballer
- Daniel Ríos (footballer, born 1995), Mexican footballer
- Danny Rios (born 1972), Spanish baseball pitcher
- Danny Ríos (born 2003), Salvadoran footballer
