= Mateo Plehan =

Croatian footballer

Personal information
- Date of birth: 13 March 2003 (age 23)
- Place of birth: Zagreb, Croatia
- Height: 1.78 m (5 ft 10 in)
- Position: Forward

Team information
- Current team: Gaj Mače
- Number: 13

Youth career
- 2010–2020: Inter Zaprešić

Senior career*
Years	Team	Apps	(Gls)
2020–2021	Inter Zaprešić	4	(0)
2022–2023	Ponikve	18	(1)
2023–2024	Samobor	12	(0)
2024–	Gaj Mače	12	(1)
- * Club domestic league appearances and goals as of 19:44, 13 May 2024 (UTC)

Mateo Plehan (born 13 March 2003) is a Croatian footballer currently playing as a forward for Gaj Mače.

== Career statistics ==
=== Club ===
As of 17 June 2020.

Club	Season	League			Cup		Continental		Other		Total	
Club	Season	Division	Apps	Goals	Apps	Goals	Apps	Goals	Apps	Goals	Apps	Goals
Inter Zaprešić	2019–20	1. HNL	1	0	0	0	0	0	0	0	1	0
Career total			1	0	0	0	0	0	0	0	1	0
