= Ivan Mance =

Croatian footballer

Personal information
- Date of birth: 4 February 1983 (age 43)
- Place of birth: Rijeka, SFR Yugoslavia
- Height: 1.95 m (6 ft 5 in)
- Position: Goalkeeper

Team information
- Current team: Göztepe (sporting director)

Youth career
- –2001: Orijent
- 2001–2002: Varteks

Senior career*
Years	Team	Apps	(Gls)
2002–2006	Varteks	12	(0)
2006–2007	Draga		
2007–2008	Pomorac	26	(0)
2008–2010	Rijeka	26	(0)
2010–2011	Maccabi Petah Tikva	5	(0)
2011–2012	Istra 1961	17	(0)
2012–2013	Rijeka	15	(0)

International career^{‡}
2001	Croatia U18	2	(0)
2001	Croatia U19	0	(0)
2004	Croatia U21	0	(0)
- * Club domestic league appearances and goals as of 27 May 2013 ‡ National team caps and goals as of 27 September 2018

Ivan Mance (born 4 February 1983) is a retired Croatian football goalkeeper and current sporting director of Göztepe

== Club career ==
Born in Rijeka, in his first professional season he played for Varteks during the 2003-04 Prva HNL, where he had spent the first three years of his professional career. He then moved on to lower Croatian divisions, before moving to Rijeka in 2008. After two seasons with Rijeka, he had a short stint in Israel, with Maccabi Petah Tikva, before returning to Croatia, where he had a season with Istra 1961, before returning to Rijeka in 2012.

=== Later career ===
In late 2013, he announced retirement and was hired in HNK Rijeka's scouting staff. Mance worked for Rijeka for nine years, until the summer of 2021, both as a scout and later sports director, before he left the club. On 25 June 2021, he was hired as a technical director at Cypriot club Pafos FC.

== Career statistics ==
Season	Club	League	League		Cup		Europe		Total	
Season	Club	League	Apps	Goals	Apps	Goals	Apps	Goals	Apps	Goals
2004–05	Varteks	Prva HNL	9	0	1	0	–		10	0
2005–06	Varteks	Prva HNL	3	0	1	0	–		4	0
2006–07	Draga	Treća HNL	–		–		–		-	–
2007–08	Pomorac Kostrena	Druga HNL	20	0	2	0	–		22	0
2008–09	Pomorac Kostrena	Druga HNL	6	0	4	0	–		10	0
2008–09	HNK Rijeka	Prva HNL	8	0	–		–		8	0
2009–10	HNK Rijeka	Prva HNL	18	0	1	0	3	0	22	0
2010-11	Maccabi Petah Tikva	Israeli Premier League	5	0	5	0	–		10	0
2011–12	NK Istra 1961	Prva HNL	17	0	1	0	–		18	0
2012–13	HNK Rijeka	1. HNL	15	0	0	0	–		15	0
2013–14	HNK Rijeka	1. HNL	0	0	1	0	1	0	2	0
HNK Rijeka total			41	0	2	0	4	0	47	0
Career total			103	0	16	0	4	0	123	0
Last Update: 19 May 2018.^{1} Source
