= Ivan Aleksić =

Croatian footballer (born 1993)

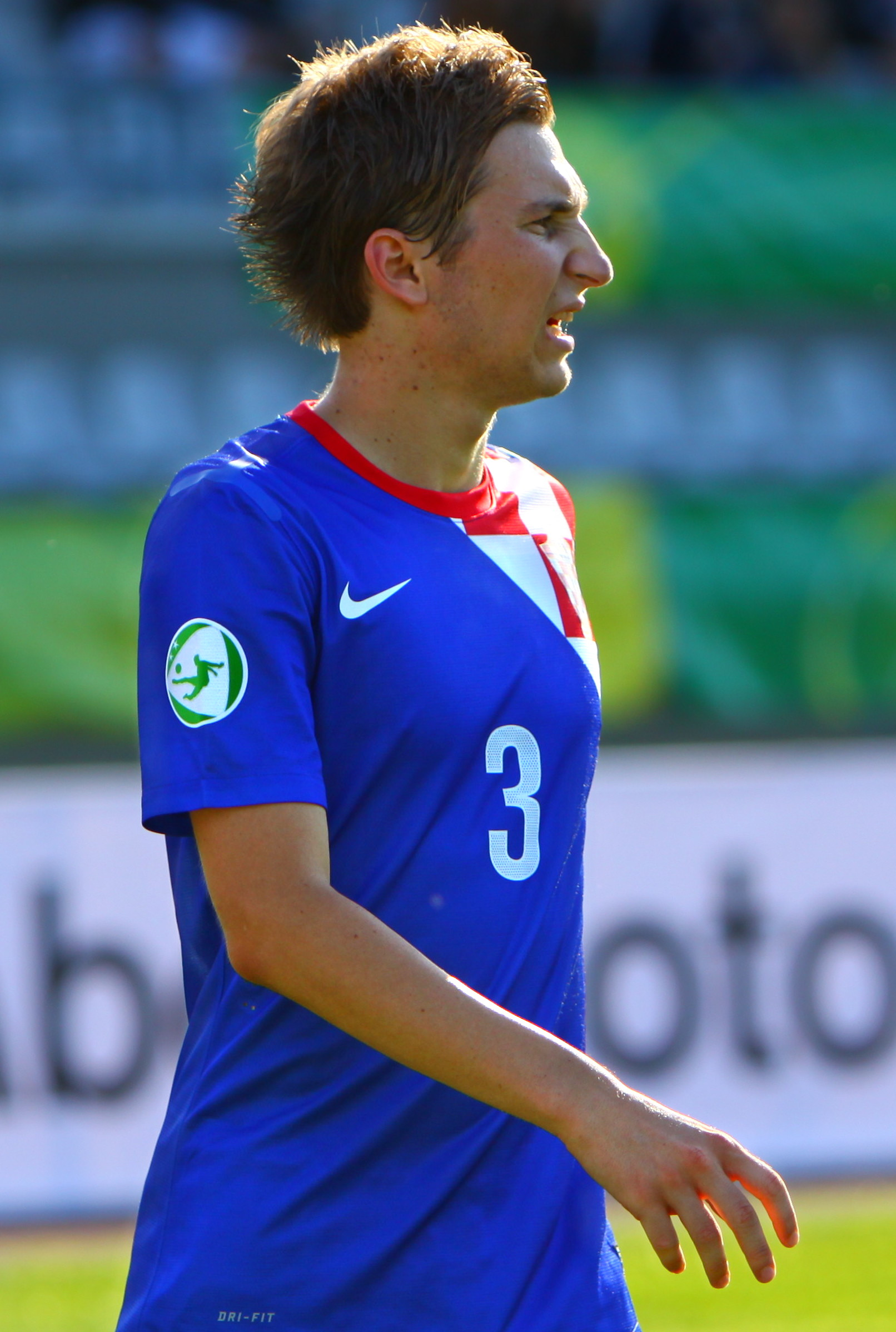
- Aleksić with Croatia U19 in 2012

Personal information
- Full name: Ivan Aleksić
- Date of birth: 6 March 1993 (age 33)
- Place of birth: Osijek, Croatia
- Height: 1.77 m (5 ft 10 in)
- Positions: Left back; left midfielder; left winger

Team information
- Current team: NK Borac Bobota
- Number: 11

Youth career
- 1999–2005: Višnjevac
- 2005–2012: Osijek

Senior career*
Years	Team	Apps	(Gls)
2011–2014	Osijek	32	(0)
2015	Višnjevac	2	(0)
2015	Inter Zaprešić	10	(1)
2015–2017	Novigrad	40	(3)
2018	KR	0	(0)
2018	→ Keflavík (loan)	5	(0)
2019	GOŠK Dubrovnik	8	(0)
2020–2021	BSK Bijelo Brdo	30	(1)
2021–2024	HNK Vukovar '91	72	(16)
2024–2025	NK Radnički Dalj	30	(8)
2025-	Višnjevac	13	(4)
2026-	NK Croatia Bogdanovci	13	(3)
2026-	NK Borac Bobota	14	(4)

International career
2008	Croatia U15	3	(1)
2009	Croatia U16	9	(2)
2009–2010	Croatia U17	13	(1)
2011	Croatia U18	4	(0)
2011–2012	Croatia U19	14	(0)
2012–2013	Croatia U20	7	(0)
- * Club domestic league appearances and goals as of 16 November 2025

Ivan Aleksić (born 6 March 1993) is a Croatian footballer who plays as a left-back for NK Borac Bobota. Alongside his playing career, he is also active as a coach and currently serves as a head coach of the HNK Vukovar '91 U14 team. In his coaching role with the HNK Vukovar ’91 U19 team during the 2025–26 season, he won the championship title in the Second NL A.

== Club career ==
Aleksić was born in Osijek on 6 March 1993. He made his professional debut for NK Osijek on 22 July 2011 in a match against NK Rijeka, wearing the number 14 shirt. During his time at the club, he made 32 official appearances.

In the summer of 2014, he moved to FK Jagodina and played in the Serbian SuperLiga during the autumn part of the season.

In January 2015, Aleksić signed for NK Inter Zaprešić. He made his first start in February 2015 against HNK Segesta Sisak and scored his first goal for the club against the same opponent on 27 March 2015. He was part of the squad that achieved promotion to the Prva HNL.

In the summer of 2015, he joined NK Novigrad. During the 2015–16 season, Novigrad qualified for the Druga HNL.

On 19 July 2018, Aleksić joined Icelandic club KR. Later that month, he was loaned to Keflavík ÍF for the remainder of the season. He made his league debut on 30 July 2018.

In September 2019, he signed for NK GOŠK Dubrovnik, before moving to BSK Bijelo Brdo in January 2020.

In the summer of 2021, Aleksić joined HNK Vukovar '91. In the 2021–22 season, the club won the Treća HNL and earned promotion. He scored 11 goals, finishing as the club's second-highest scorer. Overall, he made 72 appearances and scored 16 goals for the club.

In July 2024, Aleksić signed for NK Radnički Dalj.

In the summer of 2025, Aleksić signed for NK Višnjevac, where he made 13 appearances and scored four goals. During the winter transfer window, he moved to NK Croatia Bogdanovci.

== International career ==
Aleksić began his international career with the Croatia under-15 national team, making his debut on 14 May 2008.

He represented Croatia at all youth levels from under-15 to under-20. Most notably, he appeared in all three group-stage matches for the Croatia under-20 team at the 2013 FIFA U-20 World Cup. In total, Aleksić earned 50 caps across Croatia's youth national teams and has not been capped at senior international level.

== Coaching career ==
Aleksić obtained his UEFA C coaching licence in 2023 and completed his UEFA B licence in the summer of 2025. He currently works as the head coach of the HNK Vukovar '91 U-15 team.

== Personal life ==
Aleksić was born in Osijek and holds Croatian citizenship. In 2024, he married his wife Martina. In 2025, the couple welcomed their daughter, Lora.

== Honours ==
Inter Zaprešić

- Croatian Second League: 2014–15
