= Niko Datković =

Croatian footballer

Personal information
- Full name: Niko Datković
- Date of birth: 21 April 1993 (age 33)
- Place of birth: Rijeka, Croatia
- Height: 1.90 m (6 ft 3 in)
- Position: Centre-back

Youth career
- 2003–2008: Pomorac
- 2008–2011: Rijeka

Senior career*
Years	Team	Apps	(Gls)
2011–2016	Rijeka	39	(2)
2014–2015	→ Spezia (loan)	31	(4)
2015–2016	→ Lugano (loan)	27	(2)
2016–2018	Spezia	10	(0)
2017	→ Universitatea Craiova (loan)	9	(0)
2018–2020	Cracovia	32	(1)
2020–2021	Kisvárda	7	(1)
2021–2022	Admira Wacker	23	(1)
2022	Mirandés	3	(0)
2022–2024	Nea Salamina	41	(2)
2024–2025	Borac Banja Luka	0	(0)
Total		222	(13)

International career
2010	Croatia U17	1	(0)
2011	Croatia U18	4	(0)
2011–2012	Croatia U19	5	(0)
2011–2013	Croatia U20	9	(1)
2013–2014	Croatia U21	11	(0)
- * Club domestic league appearances and goals

Niko Datković (born 21 April 1993) is a Croatian former professional footballer who played as a centre-back.

== Club career ==
Datković was a regular starter in Rijeka's defense during his first professional year with the club in 2011–12. He made his professional debut on 26 August 2011, aged 18, in Rijeka's home win against Šibenik. In two and a half seasons with Rijeka, he collected 38 caps and scored two goals.

In early 2014, Datković was loaned to Spezia in Italy's Serie B, where he spent the second half of the 2013–14 season and the entire 2014–15 season. He spent the following season on loan with Lugano in the Swiss Super League.

On 3 September 2017, it was revealed that Spezia sent Datković on a season-long loan to CS U Craiova in Romania. On 5 August 2020, he signed with Hungarian club Kisvárda.

On 2 February 2021, Datković moved to the Austrian club Admira Wacker. On 29 January of the following year, he moved to Spanish Segunda División side Mirandés on a short-term deal.

== Career statistics ==
Season	Club	League	League		Cup		Europe		Total	
Season	Club	League	Apps	Goals	Apps	Goals	Apps	Goals	Apps	Goals
2011–12	Rijeka	Prva HNL	16	0	1	0	–		17	0
2012–13	Rijeka	Prva HNL	17	2	1	0	–		18	2
2013–14	Rijeka	Prva HNL	5	0	1	0	2	0	8	0
Rijeka total			38	2	3	0	2	0	43	2
2013–14	Spezia (loan)	Serie B	6	1	–		–		6	1
2014–15	Spezia (loan)	Serie B	25	3	2	0	–		27	3
2015–16	Lugano (loan)	Swiss Super League	27	2	2	0	–		29	2
2016–17	Spezia	Serie B	10	0	–		–		10	0
2017–18	Spezia	Serie B	0	0	–		–		0	0
2017–18	Craiova (loan)	Liga I	9	0	1	0	–		10	0
Spezia total			41	4	2	0	0	0	43	4
2017–18	Cracovia	Ekstraklasa	6	0	1	0	–		7	0
2018–19	Cracovia	Ekstraklasa	22	1	0	0	–		22	1
2019–20	Cracovia	Ekstraklasa	4	0	0	0	1	0	5	0
Cracovia total			32	1	2	0	1	0	35	1
2020–21	Admira	Austrian Bundesliga	14	1	0	0	0	0	0	0
Career total			151	10	8	0	3	0	145	9
Last Update: 20 September 2020.
