= Marijan Vuka =

Croatian former footballer (born 1980)

Personal information
- Date of birth: 10 January 1980 (age 46)
- Place of birth: Osijek, SFR Yugoslavia
- Height: 1.79 m (5 ft 10 1/2 in)
- Position: Forward

Youth career
- Osijek

Senior career*
Years	Team	Apps	(Gls)
1999–2000	Vukovar '91	27	(1)
2000–2001	Osijek	39	(13)
2001–2004	Marsonia	28	(12)
2004–2006	Kuban Krasnodar	27	(7)
2007–2008	Cibalia	7	(0)
2008	Grafičar Vodovod		
2008–2011	Međimurje	59	(32)
2011–2012	Hrvatski Dragovoljac	3	(0)
2012–2013	Konavljanin		
2013	Višnjevac		
2014	Burlington SC	14	(6)

International career
1999–2000	Croatia U20	3	(0)
- * Club domestic league appearances and goals

Marijan Vuka (born 10 January 1980) is a Croatian former footballer who played as a forward, primarily within the Croatian football leagues, with stints abroad in the Russian Premier League, and Canadian Soccer League.

== Career ==
A product of NK Osijek youth system, Vuka had spells at a number of Croatian sides in the Croatian First Football League, including NK Vukovar '91, NK Osijek, Marsonia, HNK Cibalia, NK Međimurje. Throughout his time in the Prva Liga he featured in the 2000–01 UEFA Cup, and 2001–02 UEFA Cup for NK Osijek, and played against Brøndby IF, Rapid Vienna, and AEK Athens. In 2004, he went abroad to play in the Russian Premier League with Kuban Krasnodar. After several years in Russia he returned to Croatia to play with NK Međimurje, and later played in the Croatian Second Football League with NK Grafičar Vodovod, and NK Hrvatski Dragovoljac. He would finish his football career in Croatia in the Croatian Third Football League with NK Konavljanin, and NK Višnjevac.

In 2014, he went abroad for a second term in the Canadian Soccer League to play with Burlington SC, where he appeared in 14 matches, and recorded six goals.
