= Matej Bagarić =

Croatian footballer (born 1989)

Personal information
- Date of birth: 16 January 1989 (age 37)
- Place of birth: Zagreb, SFR Yugoslavia
- Height: 2.02 m (6 ft 7 1/2 in)
- Position: Centre back

Team information
- Current team: Ponikve
- Number: 25

Youth career
- 1998–1999: Špansko
- 1999–2006: Zagreb
- 2006–2007: Dinamo Zagreb

Senior career*
Years	Team	Apps	(Gls)
2007–2011	Dinamo Zagreb	0	(0)
2008–2011	→ Lokomotiva (loan)	66	(6)
2011–2012	Lokomotiva	2	(0)
2012–2013	Inter Zaprešić	25	(0)
2013–2014	Slaven Belupo	16	(1)
2014–2015	Concordia Chiajna	14	(1)
2015	Laçi	0	(0)
2015–2017	Lučko	14	(1)
2018	Hrvatski Dragovoljac	4	(0)
2018–2019	Segesta		
2019–2020	Bistra		
2020–	Ponikve		

International career
2007	Croatia U18	4	(1)
2007–2008	Croatia U19	11	(2)
- * Club domestic league appearances and goals as of 31 March 2018

Matej Bagarić (Croatian pronunciation: [ˈmatɛj ˈbaɡaritɕ]) (born 16 January 1989 in Zagreb, SR Croatia, SFR Yugoslavia) is a Croatian professional footballer who plays for NK Ponikve. Bagarić also represented Croatia at the under–19 level.

== Club career ==
Bagarić came through youth ranks of Dinamo Zagreb, and on 26 January 2008 he joined the affiliate club Lokomotiva. He helped Lokomotiva win the league title and earn promotion to second tier. During the 2008–09 season, he featured in 24 appearances and bagged three goals for Lokomotiva, who were again promoted to the higher–level league. He remained at Lokomotiva for the 2009–10 season, and featured in the first team until he was sidelined by injuries, which continued into the 2010–11 season. His loan was prolonged until late August 2011, when his contract with Dinamo was mutually terminated and he penned a 5-year deal with NK Lokomotiva.

Ahead of the 2019–20 season, Bagarić joined NK Bistra. In 2020, he joined NK Ponikve.

== National team ==
Bagarić debuted for Croatia under–19 national team on 13 February 2007 in a match against Hungary. He was capped a total of 16 times at under–19 level and scored 4 goals.

== Honours ==
- Lokomotiva
  - 3. HNL (West) champions: 2007–08

== Career statistics ==
As of 9 September 2009

Club performance			League		Cup		League Cup		Continental		Total	
Season	Club	League	Apps	Goals	Apps	Goals	Apps	Goals	Apps	Goals	Apps	Goals
Croatia			League		Croatian Cup		League Cup		Europe		Total	
2007–08	Lokomotiva	Treća HNL	12	1							12	1
2008–09	Lokomotiva	Druga HNL	24	3							24	3
2009–10	Lokomotiva	Prva HNL	6	1							6	1
Career total			42	5	0	0	0	0	0	0	42	5
