= Vedran Ješe =

Croatian footballer (born 1981)

Personal information
- Full name: Vedran Ješe
- Date of birth: 3 February 1981 (age 45)
- Place of birth: Banja Luka, SFR Yugoslavia
- Height: 1.89 m (6 ft 2 in)
- Position: Center back

Youth career
- 1994-1995: HAŠK
- 1995–2000: NK Zagreb
- 1995–1996: → NK Posavina Zagreb (loan)

Senior career*
Years	Team	Apps	(Gls)
2000–2004	NK Zagreb	82	(9)
2001	→ Trnje (loan)	11	(4)
2004–2005	Dinamo Zagreb	18	(1)
2005–2006	Inter Zaprešić	22	(4)
2006–2009	FC Thun	9	(0)
2007	→ Bnei Yehuda (loan)	14	(3)
2007–2008	→ Ashdod (loan)	28	(0)
2008–2010	Olimpik	30	(1)
2010–2011	Kavala	0	(0)
2011–2013	Široki Brijeg	63	(4)
2014–2015	Zadar	27	(0)
2015–2021	Primorac Biograd	136	(18)

International career^{‡}
2001–2003	Croatia U-21		
2006	Croatia	2	(0)
- * Club domestic league appearances and goals as of 18 March 2021 ‡ National team caps and goals as of December 2009

Vedran Ješe born (born 3 February 1981) is a Croatian footballer who currently plays for HNK Primorac Biograd na Moru.

== Club career ==
Born in Banja Luka, where he practiced handball, Ješe took up football after emigrating to Zagreb at 13 years of age, at HAŠK. Soon he was scouted and taken into the NK Zagreb academy where he started his professional career. With Zagreb he won the Croatian First Football League title in the 2001/02 season. In September 2004, due to political pressure, he joined Dinamo Zagreb, staying one season at the club before moving on to Inter Zaprešić.

Ješe signed a 3-year contract for FC Thun in 2006.

On 15 September 2009, he signed for FK Olimpik Sarajevo. On 31 January 2010, he signed for Greek side Kavala. Playing there for only one season he then joined NK Široki Brijeg. Playing there until the summer of 2014 when he signed for NK Zadar.

== International career ==
He was part of the Croatia national under-21 football team at 2004 UEFA European Under-21 Football Championship. Ješe made his senior debut for Croatia in a January 2006 Carlsberg Cup match against South Korea and has earned a total of 2 caps, scoring no goals. His other international was three days later at the same tournament against Hong Kong.

== Honours ==
NK Zagreb

- Croatian First Football League: 2001–02
