= José Canales (footballer) =

Mexican footballer (born 1987)

Personal information
- Full name: José Francisco Canales García
- Date of birth: 4 May 1987 (age 39)
- Place of birth: Guadalajara, Jalisco, Mexico
- Height: 1.83 m (6 ft 0 in)
- Position: Goalkeeper

Team information
- Current team: Puebla (assistant)

Youth career
- Academicos

Senior career*
Years	Team	Apps	(Gls)
2006–2012	Atlas	26	(0)
2012	UdeG	8	(0)
2013–2019	BUAP	107	(0)
2019–2020	Oaxaca	17	(0)
2020	Tiburón	0	(0)

Managerial career
- 2021–2022: Atlas Reserves and Academy
- 2022: Oaxaca (Assistant)
- 2023: Tapatío (Assistant)
- 2023: Mexico U23 (Goalkeeping coach)
- 2024: Aucas (Assistant)
- 2025: Guadalajara (Assistant)
- 2026–: Puebla (assistant)
- * Club domestic league appearances and goals as of 30 August 2020

José Francisco Canales García (born 4 May 1987) is a Mexican former footballer who played as a goalkeeper.

== Club career ==
After several seasons as a back-up goalkeeper, Canales earned the starting role following a serious injury to Pedro Hernández during the Clausura 2009.

On 18 July 2020, Canales joined Atlético Ensenada from the Liga de Balompié Mexicano.
