= NK Višnjevac =

Croatian football club

- Full name: Nogometni klub Višnjevac
- Founded: 1948
- Ground: ŠRC Višnjevac
- Capacity: 1,500
- Manager: Milan Matijević
- League: MŽNL Osijek-Vinkovci (5th level)
- 2022—23: MŽNL Osijek-Vinkovci, 16th of 18
Home colours

NK Višnjevac is a Croatian football club based in the village of Višnjevac, near Osijek. The team won the Treća HNL East Division in 2003–04, but did not apply for promotion to the second division. As of 2023, they participate in the MŽNL Osijek-Vinkovci, the 5th level of Croatian football.

== History ==
NK Višnjevac were founded in 1948.

The club, then playing in the third division, were sanctioned in 2009 after they wore a kit with a political party's logo on it.

They won the county cup in 2012 leading to an appearance in the 2012-13 Croatian cup where they lost to Istra 1961 in the 1/16th round. Marijan Vuka signed for the club in 2013 at the close of his career.

In 2016, three Korean players joined Višnjevac, and were the target of purchase of a Korean businessman. However they were relegated to the fourth division in 2017.

The club also has a women's team, founded in 2018 and playing as ŽNK Višnjevac, and a sports school.

== Honours ==
(Croatia) Treća HNL – East:

- Winners (1): 2003–04
