= Danijel Cesarec =

Croatian footballer

Personal information
- Date of birth: 8 January 1983 (age 43)
- Place of birth: Slavonski Brod, SR Croatia, SFR Yugoslavia
- Height: 1.85 m (6 ft 1 in)
- Position: Striker

Senior career*
Years	Team	Apps	(Gls)
2000–2002	Marsonia	41	(7)
2002–2005	Sparta Prague	3	(0)
2003–2004	→ Příbram (loan)	23	(3)
2004–2005	→ Akratitos (loan)	24	(10)
2005–2007	Egaleo	40	(5)
2007–2010	Asteras Tripolis	72	(26)
2010–2012	Aris	31	(4)
2012	Maccabi Haifa	8	(1)
2012–2014	Rijeka	22	(7)
2014	→ Osijek (loan)	12	(4)
2014	Slaven Belupo	16	(2)

International career^{‡}
2002–2003	Croatia U21	3	(0)
- * Club domestic league appearances and goals as of 14 December 2014 ‡ National team caps and goals as of 6 October 2009

Danijel Cesarec (born 8 January 1983) is a Croatian retired footballer.

== Club career ==
=== NK Marsonia ===
Cesarec started his career in NK Marsonia. He played there 2 years (2000–2002), making 40 appearances and scoring 6 league goals. This good season was a result of a big interest from foreign clubs.

=== Sparta Prague ===
In 2002, Daniel joined Czech major club AC Sparta Prague. In Prague he made only 3 league appearances, and his dream never became true. Then, Sparta sent him loan at 1. FK Příbram. There, he made 23 league appearances, scoring 3 goals. After Příbram, Sparta Prague sent him (again) on loan at Akratitos F.C. In Akratitos, he had a fine season, with 24 performances and 10 goals.

=== Greece ===
==== Egaleo ====
Cesarec spent 2005–2007 years in Egaleo F.C. He had full seasons in Aigaleo, with a total of 40 appearances and only 5 goals. However, many Greek teams are interested to sign Cesarec.

==== Asteras Trpolis ====
Cesarec had his best time of his career in Tripoli, Greece. He joined Asteras Tripolis in 2007 summer. He stayed there for 3 years with fine seasons. His statistics with blue-yellow jersey are 72 performances and 26 goals. He was expert for heading and penalty-taking. He is the club's top goalscorer ever in Super League Greece. He was one of the most successful forwards these years.

==== Aris ====
His good form with Asteras led to him signing for Greek side Aris, but Cesarec was affected by injury and made only 30 appearances for Aris, scoring 5 goals (although three of these were in the UEFA Europa League, marking Cesarec's best goal return in European competition to date). In the 2011–2012 season, he made two league appearances, scoring in both games, against Panionios and Panathinaikos.

== Career statistics ==
=== Club ===
As of 30 December 2011.

Club	Season	League			Cup			Europe			Total		
Club	Season	Apps	Goals	Assists	Apps	Goals	Assists	Apps	Goals	Assists	Apps	Goals	Assists
Asteras Tripolis	2008–09	19	8	0	2	2	0	-	-	-	21	10	0
Asteras Tripolis	2009–10	29	10	7	2	1	0	-	-	-	31	11	7
Aris	2010–11	23	2	1	0	0	0	8	3	0	31	5	1
Aris	2011–12	8	2	0	1	0	0	-	-	-	9	2	0
