= Luis Delgadillo =

Mexican footballer (born 1991)

Personal information
- Full name: José Luis Delgadillo Pulido
- Date of birth: 23 April 1991 (age 35)
- Place of birth: Ciudad Guzmán, Jalisco, Mexico
- Height: 1.82 m (6 ft 0 in)
- Position: Striker

Team information
- Current team: Lobos BUAP
- Number: 14

Youth career
- 2010–2011: Atlas

Senior career*
Years	Team	Apps	(Gls)
2011–	Atlas	0	(0)
2011	→ HNK Rijeka (loan)	4	(0)
2013–	→ Lobos BUAP (loan)	3	(0)
- * Club domestic league appearances and goals as of 9 September 2013 ‡ National team caps and goals as of 25 July 2011

José Luis Delgadillo Pulido (born April 23, 1991) is a Mexican football striker who plays for Lobos de la BUAP on loan from Atlas.

== Club career ==
=== Club Atlas ===
Luis Delgadillo formed part of the youth teams of Club Atlas and played in the team of Segunda Division de Mexico.

=== HNK Rijeka ===
Delgadillo was transferred on loan to HNK Rijeka on 5 July 2011. In that transfer his teammate Carlos Gutiérrez, was transferred too, from the Club Atlas.

Both clubs signed an agreement where both institutions made an exchange of players, as well as working structure of basic forces.

With the agreement signed, Robert Komen chairman of HNK Rijeka presented to Luis Delgadillo as the first hire of the Rijeka to the 2011–12 Prva HNL season with his teammate Gutiérrez.

== Career statistics ==
=== Club ===
Club performance			League		Cup		Continental		Total	
Season	Club	League	Apps	Goals	Apps	Goals	Apps	Goals	Apps	Goals
Croatia			League		Croatian Cup		Europe		Total	
2011–12	HNK Rijeka	Prva HNL	3	0	1	0	0	0	4	0
Total	Croatia		3	0	1	0	0	0	4	0
Career total			4	0	1	0	0	0	5	0
