= Fabricio Fuentes =

Argentine footballer (botn 1976)

Personal information
- Full name: Fabricio Fabio Fuentes
- Date of birth: 13 October 1976 (age 50)
- Place of birth: Las Acequias, Argentina
- Height: 1.85 m (6 ft 1 in)
- Position: Centre back

Senior career*
Years	Team	Apps	(Gls)
1996–2001	Newell's Old Boys	92	(10)
1997–1998	→ Quilmes (loan)	44	(1)
2001–2003	Vélez Sársfield	69	(5)
2003	Guingamp	12	(1)
2004–2005	Vélez Sársfield	51	(3)
2005–2006	Atlas	34	(2)
2006–2009	Villarreal	67	(8)
2010–2011	Atlas	26	(3)
2011	Newell's Old Boys	6	(0)
Total		401	(33)

International career
2005	Argentina	1	(0)
- * Club domestic league appearances and goals

Fabricio Fabio Fuentes (born 13 October 1976) is an Argentine retired footballer who played as a central defender.

He competed professionally, other than in his country, in France, Mexico and Spain, amassing Primera División totals of 218 games and 18 goals over the course of ten seasons.

== Club career ==
Fuentes was born in Las Acequias. He began his career playing for Newell's Old Boys in 1996, leaving the following year for Quilmes Atlético Club in the Argentine second division before rejoining Newell's in 1998.

In 2001, Fuentes was signed for his first spell at Club Atlético Vélez Sársfield, on a US$450,000 fee (for 50% of his transfer rights). In January 2003 he was sold to Mexican club Querétaro F.C. for US$1,200,000 but, in the transfer agreement, it was established that the player would stay with Vélez until the end of the season.

However, after a good last months as Vélez's captain, Fuentes' value increased, and he was immediately sold by Querétaro to En Avant Guingamp for US$2,000,000, before having playing any official game in Mexico. After half a season in France he returned to Vélez, helping the team win the league's Clausura in 2005.

Following this success, Fuentes returned to Mexico with F.C. Atlas, but he only stayed one season before moving again, this time to Villarreal CF in Spain, where he re-joined former Vélez teammate Leandro Somoza as well as fellow Argentines Rodolfo Arruabarrena, Mariano Barbosa, Juan Román Riquelme and Gonzalo Rodríguez. During his debut campaign he benefited from a serious knee injury to the latter and scored four times in 33 La Liga games; the following years, however, he returned to the bench, but continued to be used regularly even though he also suffered serious knee problems in January 2008.

On 4 January 2010, Fuentes was released by Villarreal upon the player's request, signing with Atlas and thus returning to the side after three-and-a-half years.

== International career ==
Fuentes played once for Argentina, a friendly against Mexico on 9 March 2005 in which the former only fielded players from the domestic league. He scored in his own net, in an eventual 1–1 draw.

== Honours ==
Vélez

- Argentine Primera División: 2005 Clausura
