= Eduardo Rergis (footballer, born 1956) =

Mexican footballer and manager (born 1956)

Personal information
- Full name: Eduardo Rergis Pacheco
- Date of birth: 20 April 1956 (age 70)
- Place of birth: Veracruz, Mexico
- Height: 1.75 m (5 ft 9 in)
- Position: Defender

Senior career*
Years	Team	Apps	(Gls)
1977–1980	América		
1980–1983	Atlante		
1983–1984	Oaxtepec		
1984–1986	Tampico Madero		
1986–1988	Tigres UANL		
1988–1989	Atlante		
1989–1992	Veracruz		

International career
1976	Mexico Olympic	3	(0)
1977	Mexico U20	2	(1)
1983–1990	Mexico	4	(0)

Managerial career
- 1993: Veracruz (interim)
- 1996–1997: Puebla (assistant)
- 1998: León (assistant)
- 2000: Atlante
- 2002–2003: Mexico U20
- 2005: Veracruz (interim)
- 2006: Monarcas Morelia (assistant)
- 2006–2007: Correcaminos UAT
- 2007–2008: Jaguares de Chiapas (assistant)
- 2009: Santos Laguna (assistant)
- 2011: Santos Laguna (interim)
- 2014: Dorados de Sinaloa (assistant)
- 2017: Atlante (assistant)
- 2017: Atlante (interim)
Medal record
Pan American Games
Gold medal – first place	1975 Mexico City	Team competition
- * Club domestic league appearances and goals

Eduardo Rergis Pacheco (born 20 April 1956) is a Mexican former footballer and manager.

== Career ==
Rergis played as a central defender for Club América, Atlante, Oaxtepec, Tampico Madero, Tigres UANL and Veracruz.

Rergis played for Mexico at the 1976 Summer Olympics in Montreal and won a gold medal in football at the 1975 Pan American Games. He also participated in the 1977 FIFA World Youth Championship in Tunisia.

After he retired from playing, Rergis became a football coach. He has managed Deportivo Irapuato, Correcaminos UAT and Veracruz. He also led the Mexico U-20 team at the 2003 FIFA U-20 World Cup. He was an interim manager for Santos Laguna in 2011.

== Personal ==
Rergis's sons, Guillermo and Eduardo, are also Mexican former footballer.
