= Fenan Salčinović =

Bosnian footballer

- Salčinović with Zrinjski Mostar in 2010

Personal information
- Full name: Fenan Salčinović
- Date of birth: 26 June 1987 (age 39)
- Place of birth: Zenica, SFR Yugoslavia
- Height: 1.78 m (5 ft 10 in)
- Position: Left winger

Team information
- Current team: Čelik Zenica
- Number: 10

Senior career*
Years	Team	Apps	(Gls)
2004–2009	Čelik Zenica	84	(4)
2009–2010	Lech Poznań	0	(0)
2009–2010	→ Sandefjord (loan)	40	(4)
2010–2011	Zrinjski Mostar	14	(1)
2011–2012	Rijeka	19	(2)
2012	Olimpik Sarajevo	7	(0)
2013–2014	Sandefjord	12	(0)
2014	Čelik Zenica	9	(2)
2015–2021	Čelik Zenica	67 (Note: Does not include data from the 2014–15 and 2020–21 seasons.)	(2)
2022–2023	Čelik Zenica	10	(1)
2024–	Čelik Zenica	1	(0)

International career
2008	Bosnia and Herzegovina	1	(0)
- * Club domestic league appearances and goals as of 26 June 2024

Fenan Salčinović (born 26 June 1987) is a Bosnian professional footballer who plays as a midfielder for Čelik Zenica.

He has one cap for the Bosnia and Herzegovina national football team, earned in a match against Japan on 30 January 2008.

== Club career ==
He started his career in 2004 for Čelik and he stayed there until 2009. After Čelik he played for Lech Poznań, Sandefjord Fotball, HŠK Zrinjski Mostar and HNK Rijeka.

On 5 September 2012, Salčinović signed for FK Olimpik Sarajevo after leaving Rijeka. Olimpik however wasn't able to pay his wages so he was released from his contract in January. On 12 March 2013, Salčinović returned to Sandefjord.

In February 2014, Salčinović signed a contract to return to his home town to play for NK Čelik Zenica. In July 2014 he left Čelik, but came back to the club in January 2015.

== International career ==
Salčinović has one cap for the Bosnia and Herzegovina national football team, earned in a match against Japan on 30 January 2008 in which he came on for Mladen Žižović only 5 minutes before the final whistle.
