= Ante Sarić =

Croatian footballer

Personal information
- Full name: Ante Sarić
- Date of birth: 17 June 1992 (age 34)
- Place of birth: Zadar, Croatia
- Height: 1.84 m (6 ft 0 in)
- Position: Defender

Youth career
- –2011: Zadar

Senior career*
Years	Team	Apps	(Gls)
2011–2015	Zadar	98	(1)
2016	Politehnica Iași	7	(0)
2017	Metalleghe-BSI	12	(0)
2017–2020	Zadar	10	(0)
2020	NK Vodice		

International career
2010	Croatia U-19	2	(0)
2011	Croatia U-20	2	(0)
- * Club domestic league appearances and goals as of 27 February 2020

Ante Sarić (born 17 June 1992) is a Croatian professional footballer who plays as a defender.
