= Andréa Mbuyi-Mutombo =

Congolese footballer (born 1990)

Personal information
- Full name: Andréa M'Buyi-Mutombo
- Date of birth: 7 June 1990 (age 36)
- Place of birth: Brussels, Belgium
- Position: Forward

Youth career
- –2006: Anderlecht
- 2006–2007: FC Brussels
- 2007–2008: Portsmouth

Senior career*
Years	Team	Apps	(Gls)
2008–2009	Portsmouth	0	(0)
2008	→ Zulte Waregem (loan)	14	(3)
2009–2011	Standard Liège	2	(1)
2010–2011	→ Sint-Truiden (loan)	28	(1)
2011–2012	Cercle Brugge	8	(0)
2012–2013	Rijeka	20	(0)
2014–2015	Istra	5	(0)
2015	Fréjus Saint-Raphaël	15	(2)
2015–2016	Inverness Caledonian Thistle	19	(1)
2017–2018	RNK Split		
2018–2019	Partick Thistle	9	(0)
2019–????	Stade Lausanne Ouchy		

International career
2007	Belgium U19	3	(0)
2011	DR Congo	1	(0)
- * Club domestic league appearances and goals

Andréa Mbuyi-Mutombo (born 7 June 1990 is a Congolese former footballer.

== Career ==
Mbuyi-Mutombo began his career in the youth from Anderlecht, then in 2006 joined FC Brussels. After one year at Strombeek he was scouted and signed for Portsmouth. Mbuyi was sent on loan from Portsmouth to feeder club Zulte Waregem on 22 August 2008. He scored on his debut for Waregem, scoring in the 89th minute against Mechelen, just minutes after being substituted into the game. He scored yet again in his next match against Tubize. After only six months, the Congolese midfielder returned to Portsmouth from Zulte Waregem, where he played 14 games and scored three goals. Mutombo was supposed to stay in Belgium on loan until June, but the Belgian club officials were not happy with his attitude.

Following his release, he underwent trials at Dutch Eredivisie side NEC. He was linked with moves to Genoa, Sporting CP and Sporting Braga. On 19 June 2009, the 18-year-old attacking midfielder joined Standard Liège on a two-year deal.

On 11 December 2011, Mbuyi-Mutombo moved to Cercle Brugge on a one-year deal. After spells with Rijeka, Istra and Fréjus Saint-Raphaël, he signed a one-year deal with Scottish club Inverness Caledonian Thistle on 30 July 2015. He scored his first goal for Inverness in a 2–0 Scottish Cup win over Stirling Albion on 19 January 2016. Mutombo returned to Scotland in August 2018 signing a one-year deal with Partick Thistle. Mutombo left Thistle in January 2019 having scored 3 goals in all competitions.

== International ==
He was a youth international for Belgium, at under-19 level.

In 2011, he made his debut for the DR Congo national team.
