= Ivor Weitzer =

Croatian footballer

Personal information
- Date of birth: 24 May 1988 (age 38)
- Place of birth: Rijeka, SR Croatia, SFR Yugoslavia
- Position: Midfielder

Team information
- Current team: Opatija
- Number: 10

Youth career
- Rijeka

Senior career*
Years	Team	Apps	(Gls)
2006–2009	Rijeka	1	(0)
2007–2009	→ Orijent (loan)	56	(11)
2009–2010	Pomorac	25	(8)
2010–2011	Široki Brijeg	13	(0)
2011	Istra 1961	3	(1)
2011–2012	Pomorac	26	(14)
2012–2013	Rijeka	21	(3)
2013	Malavan	7	(0)
2014	Zadar	33	(8)
2015	Pécs	12	(0)
2015	Lučko	12	(0)
2016	Panelefsiniakos	10	(1)
2016–2017	Vllaznia Shkodër	11	(0)
2017	Buxoro	19	(4)
2018	Sloboda Tuzla	4	(0)
2018–2019	Orijent 1919	30	(16)
2019–2020	Al-Arabi	0	(0)
2020–2022	Opatija	28	(10)
2021	→ Erbil (loan)	2	(1)
2022–2024	Halubjan	45	(23)
2024–	Opatija	45	(6)

International career
2007	Croatia U19	1	(0)
- * Club domestic league appearances and goals as of 17 June 2026

Ivor Weitzer (born 24 May 1988) is a Croatian football player who plays for Opatija in the Croatian Second Football League.

== Career ==
Born in Rijeka, in his first professional season he had one appearance with Rijeka during the 2006–07 Prva HNL. Since then, he played for Orijent, Pomorac, Široki Brijeg and Istra 1961. He was the top scorer of Pomorac in the 2011–12 Druga HNL. In 2012, he moved back to Rijeka, where he spent one season.

== Career statistics ==
Season	Club	League	League		Cup		Europe		Total	
Season	Club	League	Apps	Goals	Apps	Goals	Apps	Goals	Apps	Goals
2006–07	HNK Rijeka	1. HNL	1	0	0	0	0	0	1	0
2007–08	Orijent Rijeka	3. HNL (West)	26	2	–		–		26	2
2008–09	Orijent Rijeka	3. HNL (West)	30	9	2	0	–		32	9
2009–10	Pomorac Kostrena	2. HNL	25	8	4	3	–		29	11
2010–11	Široki Brijeg	Premier League	13	0	0	0	3	1	16	1
2010–11	Istra 1961	1. HNL	3	1	–		–		3	1
2011–12	Pomorac Kostrena	2. HNL	26	14	1	0	–		27	14
2012–13	HNK Rijeka	1. HNL	21	3	1	0	–		22	3
2013–14	Malavan F.C.	Pro League	7	0	–		–		7	0
2013–14	NK Zadar	1. HNL	14	5	–		–		14	5
2014–15	NK Zadar	1. HNL	19	3	2	1	–		21	4
2014–15	Pécsi MFC	Nemzeti Bajnokság I	12	0	–		–		12	0
2015–16	NK Lučko	2. HNL	12	0	–		–		12	0
2015–16	Panelefsiniakos F.C.	Football League	10	1	–		–		10	1
2016–17	Vllaznia Shkodër	Superliga	11	0	3	2	–		14	2
2017	FK Buxoro	Super League	19	4	–		–		19	4
2017–18	Sloboda Tuzla	Premier League	4	0	0	0	–		4	0
2018–19	Orijent 1919	3. HNL (West)	30	16	–		–		30	16
Career total			309	56	13	6	3	1	325	63
Last Update: 2 June 2019.
