= Kris Jogan =

Slovenian footballer

Personal information
- Date of birth: 14 September 1991 (age 35)
- Place of birth: Šempeter pri Gorici, Slovenia
- Height: 1.90 m (6 ft 3 in)
- Position: Forward

Youth career
- Bilje
- –2010: Gorica

Senior career*
Years	Team	Apps	(Gls)
2010–2012	Gorica	75	(6)
2012–2014	Verona	0	(0)
2013	→ Rijeka (loan)	5	(1)
2013–2014	→ Nocerina (loan)	6	(1)
2014	→ Aversa Normanna (loan)	5	(0)
2014–2015	Bilje	8	(4)
2015–2016	FC Kufstein	38	(15)
2016–2017	Brda	23	(5)
2017–2018	Sammaurese	37	(7)
2018–2019	San Donà	4	(0)
2019	Gemonese 1919		
2019–2020	Brda	18	(3)
2020	Gemonese 1919		
2020–2022	Azzurra Premariacco		
2022–2024	Pro Romans Medea		

International career
2009	Slovenia U19	1	(0)
2010–2012	Slovenia U21	2	(1)
- * Club domestic league appearances and goals

Kris Jogan (born 14 September 1991) is a Slovenian former footballer who played as a forward.

== Club career ==
Jogan started his career playing at youth level for Gorica, where he signed a professional contract in 2010. In August 2012, he transferred to Verona, but was immediately loaned to Gorica. In January 2013, he was loaned to Rijeka.

In August 2013, Jogan was loaned to Nocerina. On 30 January 2014, he went on another loan, this time to Aversa Normanna.

In summer 2014 he was released by Verona. In the same summer he returned to Slovenia for Bilje. In early 2015, Jogan signed with the Austrian Regionalliga West side FC Kufstein. In 2016, he once again returned to Slovenia, spending a season with Brda in the Slovenian Second League. In 2017, Jogan joined Italian lower division side Sammaurese.
