= Robert Lisjak =

Croatian Goalkeeper (born 1978)

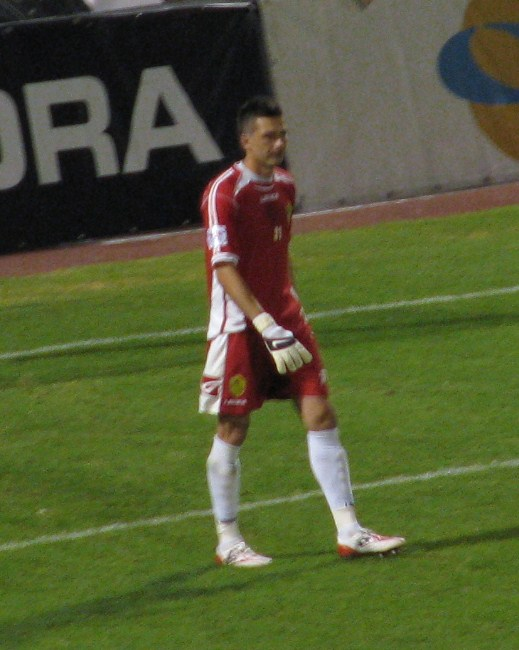

Personal information
- Full name: Robert Lisjak
- Date of birth: 5 February 1978 (age 48)
- Place of birth: Koprivnica, Croatia
- Height: 1.86 m (6 ft 1 in)
- Position: Goalkeeper

Youth career
- Križevci

Senior career*
Years	Team	Apps	(Gls)
1998–2007	Slaven Belupo	89	(0)
2007–2010	Istra 1961	59	(0)
2010–2013	Rijeka	76	(0)
2013	→ Osijek (loan)	0	(0)
2013–2014	Istra	26	(0)
2014–2017	Funtana	52	(0)
2017–2017	Medulin		
- * Club domestic league appearances and goals as of 2016-26-04

Robert Lisjak (born 5 February 1978) is a Croatian retired football goalkeeper who played for NK Funtana.

== Career statistics ==
Club	Season	League	League		Cup		Europe		Total	
Club	Season	League	Apps	Goals	Apps	Goals	Apps	Goals	Apps	Goals
Slaven Belupo	1998–99	1. HNL	1	0	–		–		1	0
Slaven Belupo	1999–00	1. HNL	3	0	–		–		20	1
Slaven Belupo	2000–01	1. HNL	0	0	1	0	2	0	3	0
Slaven Belupo	2001–02	1. HNL	5	0	0	0	–		5	0
Slaven Belupo	2002–03	1. HNL	12	0	1	0	–		13	0
Slaven Belupo	2003–04	1. HNL	12	0	2	0	–		14	0
Slaven Belupo	2004–05	1. HNL	32	0	2	0	7	0	41	0
Slaven Belupo	2005–06	1. HNL	18	0	4	0	3	0	25	0
Slaven Belupo	2006–07	1. HNL	6	0	1	0	–		7	0
Istra 1961	2007–08	2. HNL	0	0	1	0	–		1	0
Istra 1961	2008–09	2. HNL	1	0	1	0	–		2	0
Istra 1961	2009–10	1. HNL	25	0	0	0	–		25	0
HNK Rijeka	2010–11	1. HNL	30	0	2	0	–		32	0
HNK Rijeka	2011–12	1. HNL	28	0	4	0	–		32	0
HNK Rijeka	2012–13	1. HNL	18	0	1	0	–		19	0
NK Osijek	2012–13	1. HNL	0	0	–		–		0	0
Istra Pula	2013–14	1. ŽNL	26	0	–		–		26	0
Career total			217	0	20	0	12	0	249	0
