= Jure Jerbić =

Croatian footballer

Personal information
- Date of birth: 28 June 1990 (age 36)
- Place of birth: Zadar, SFR Yugoslavia
- Height: 1.89 m (6 ft 2 in)
- Position: Centre back

Team information
- Current team: NŠK Sveti Mihovil Sutomišćica
- Number: 15

Youth career
- Zadar

Senior career*
Years	Team	Apps	(Gls)
2008–2015	Zadar	163	(8)
2016	Shkëndija	1	(0)
2016–2017	Cibalia	17	(0)
2018–2023	Zadar	22	(3)
2023-2026	NK Novalja	56	(4)
2026-	NŠK Sveti Mihovil Sutomiščica		
- * Club domestic league appearances and goals as of 8 September 2022

Jure Jerbić (born 28 June 1990) is a Croatian football player, who plays for NŠK Sveti Mihovil Sutomišćica
