= Jorge Achucarro =

Paraguayan footballer (born 1981)

Personal information
- Full name: Jorge Daniel Achucarro
- Date of birth: 6 November 1981 (age 45)
- Place of birth: Fernando de la Mora, Paraguay
- Height: 1.74 m (5 ft 9 in)
- Position: Striker

Team information
- Current team: Cerro Porteño (assistant)

Senior career*
Years	Team	Apps	(Gls)
1998–2007	Cerro Porteño	215	(48)
2008–2011	Atlas	45	(11)
2009–2010	→ Newell's Old Boys (loan)	31	(8)
2011–2012	Banfield	44	(5)
2012–2013	Colón	9	(1)
2013–2014	Nacional	21	(1)
2014–2015	12 de Octubre	19	(1)
2015	Deportivo Capiatá	14	(3)
2015–2016	Chacarita Juniors	17	(8)
2016	Boca Unidos	15	(2)
2016–2017	General Díaz	15	(3)
2017	Rubio Ñu	20	(3)
2017–2018	Deportivo Capiatá	22	(1)
2019	Club 4 de Agosto		
2019	Club 8 de Setiembre		

International career
2004	Paraguay U23		(1)
2003–2010	Paraguay	12	(0)

Managerial career
- 2019: Cerro Porteño U16
- 2019–: Cerro Porteño (assistant)
- 2024: Cerro Porteño (interim)
- 2025: Cerro Porteño (interim)
- 2026: Cerro Porteño (interim)
- * Club domestic league appearances and goals

Jorge Daniel Achucarro (born 6 November 1981) is a Paraguayan football manager and former player who played as a striker. He is the current assistant manager of Cerro Porteño.

Achucarro has played for the Paraguay national football team.

== Career ==
=== Club career ===
Achucarro began his professional playing career in 1998 with Cerro Porteño, where he made over 200 appearances before leaving the club in 2008 to join the Mexican side Atlas.

In 2009, he was signed by Newell's Old Boys as a replacement for the club's former striker, the Paraguayan Santiago Salcedo.

=== Later and coaching career ===
In March 2019, Achucarro returned to the pitch, joining Paraguayan lower side Club 4 de Agosto in Areguá. However, he moved to another club in the summer 2019, joining Club 8 de Setiembre in Valle Pucú, Areguá.

Beside playing for 8 de Setiembre, which he was crowned champion of the 2019 Liga Regional de Areguá with, Achucarro was also hired as U16 head coach at his former club Cerro Porteño. On 9 October 2019, he was promoted as assistant coach to interim head coach, Víctor Bernay, for the rest of the season. Achucarro stayed at the club for the 2020 season in a different role.
