= Florencio Morán =

Mexican footballer (born 1987)

Personal information
- Full name: Florencio Javier Morán Manzo
- Date of birth: 27 March 1987 (age 39)
- Place of birth: Guadalajara, Jalisco, Mexico
- Height: 1.79 m (5 ft 10 1/2 in)
- Position: Goalkeeper

Team information
- Current team: Atlas U-21 (Manager)

Senior career*
Years	Team	Apps	(Gls)
2006–2009	Atlas	0	(0)
2006–2007	→ Puebla (loan)	4	(0)
2011	Tepic	3	(0)
2013–2019	U. de G.	18	(0)
2019	Loros UdeC	3	(0)
2020	San José	0	(0)

Managerial career
- 2022–: Atlas Reserves and Academy
- * Club domestic league appearances and goals as of 21:28, 23 September 2019 (UTC)

Florencio Javier Morán Manzo (born 27 March 1987) is a former football goalkeeper who last played for Loros UdeC in the Ascenso MX.

== Club career ==
After several seasons as a back-up goalkeeper.
