= Pedro Hernández (footballer, born 1981) =

Mexican footballer (born 1981)

Personal information
- Full name: Pedro Hernández Calderón
- Date of birth: 21 June 1981 (age 45)
- Place of birth: Guadalajara, Mexico
- Height: 1.87 m (6 ft 2 in)
- Position: Goalkeeper

Senior career*
Years	Team	Apps	(Gls)
2004–2005	Delfines de Coatzacoalcos	33	(0)
2005	Santos Laguna	5	(0)
2007–2010	Atlas	31	(0)
2010–2011	→ Necaxa (loan)	14	(0)
2012	→ Irapuato (loan)	4	(0)

Managerial career
- 2013–2015: Chiapas (Goalkeeper coach)
- 2016: Coras (Goalkeeper coach)
- 2017–2018: Atlante (Goalkeeper coach)
- 2020: Tampico Madero (Goalkeeper coach)
- * Club domestic league appearances and goals as of 5 October 2012

Pedro Hernández Calderón (born 21 June 1981) is a former football goalkeeper who last played for Irapuato FC on loan from Club Atlas.

== Club career ==
After several seasons as a back-up goalkeeper, Hernandez began the Clausura 2009 as the first choice goalkeeper for Atlas.

Atlas loaned Hernández to Club Necaxa in 2009, and he returned to the club on another six-month loan in December 2010.

Hernandez played the 2010 Bicentenario Final with Necaxa in which they defeated Leon 4–2 in the global score.
