= NK Ponikve =

Croatian football club

- Full name: Nogometni klub Ponikve
- Nickname(s): Gajničari
- Founded: 1945
- Ground: SRC Ponikve
- Capacity: 1,000
- President: Damir Kajba
- Coach: Hrvoje Pipnić
- League: Četvrta HNL – Central A
- 2024-2025: 13th
| Home colours | Away colours |

NK Ponikve is a Croatian football club founded in 1945, based in Zagreb.

Interest in football in Stenjevec rose immediately after the Second World War. At the current location of the club, Stenjevec residents enabled the construction of the first football field and gathered a group of youths in early June 1945.

On October 25, 1953, the constituent assembly of NK Ponikve convened for the first time;. It elected the first chairman, Jakov Horvat. Under the new name, the team played its first official match in the national cup competition on March 7, 1954. The first team to play under its current name consisted of Bruno Žerjav, Ivan Podgoršek, Josip Marković, Željko Zlatić, Nikola Svetličanin, Drago Brož, Franjo Dukanović, Viktor Vuletić, Z. Milin, Anton Potočnik and Erich Štrukelj.

Currently, the club is training about 300 children registered in the soccer schools and children 4–6 years old; this is popularly known as "Little Green".
