= Igor Banović =

Croatian footballer

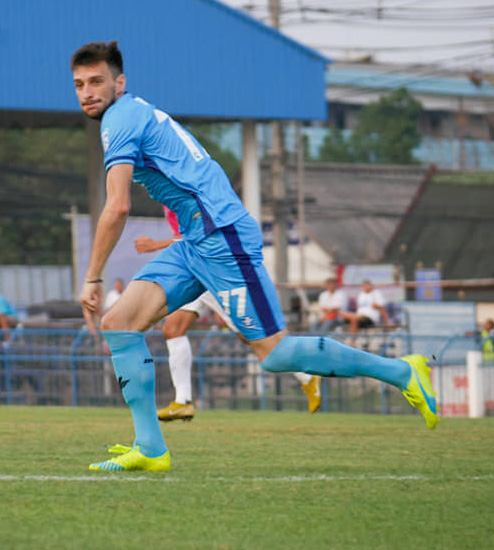
- Igor Banović playing for Samut Sakhon.

Personal information
- Full name: Igor Banović
- Date of birth: 12 May 1987 (age 39)
- Place of birth: Zadar, SFR Yugoslavia
- Height: 1.85 m (6 ft 1 in)
- Position: Midfielder

Team information
- Current team: NŠK Sveti Mihovil Sutomiščica
- Number: 8

Youth career
- NK Zadar
- Novalja

Senior career*
Years	Team	Apps	(Gls)
–2008	Novalja		
2008–2009	Raštane		
2009–2013	NK Zadar	92	(6)
2013–2014	Domžale	11	(2)
2014–2015	NK Zadar	35	(2)
2015–2017	Milsami Orhei	54	(10)
2017–2019	Lokomotiv Plovdiv	47	(2)
2019	Isloch	11	(0)
2020	Samut Sakhon	14	(1)
2021–2023	HNK Zadar		
2023–2026	NK Novalja		
2026–	NŠK Sveti Mihovil Sutomiščica		
- * Club domestic league appearances and goals as of 17:37, 5 April 2021 (UTC)

Igor Banović (born 12 May 1987) is a Croatian professional footballer who plays as a midfielder for NŠK Sveti Mihovil Sutomiščica.

He has previously played for Zadar, Domžale, Milsami Orhei, Lokomotiv Plovdiv, and Isloch Minsk Raion.

== Honours ==
=== Club ===
Lokomotiv Plovdiv

- Bulgarian Cup: 2018–19
