= Gonzalo Vargas =

Uruguayan footballer (born 1981)

Personal information
- Full name: Gonzalo Sebastián Vargas Abella
- Date of birth: 22 September 1981 (age 45)
- Place of birth: Montevideo, Uruguay
- Height: 1.75 m (5 ft 9 in)
- Position: Striker

Senior career*
Years	Team	Apps	(Gls)
2001–2004	Defensor Sporting	124	(54)
2004–2006	Gimnasia de La Plata	55	(27)
2006–2009	Monaco	8	(0)
2007–2008	→ Sochaux (loan)	10	(3)
2008–2009	→ Atlas (loan)	32	(10)
2009–2011	Atlas	24	(3)
2010–2011	→ Argentinos Juniors (loan)	22	(4)
2011–2012	Gimnasia de La Plata	23	(4)
2012–2013	Bella Vista	8	(13)
2013–2014	Rampla Juniors	28	(13)

International career
2002–2007	Uruguay	10	(3)
- * Club domestic league appearances and goals as of 1 November 2012

Gonzalo Sebastián Vargas Abella (born 22 September 1981) is a Uruguayan former football striker. He last played for Rampla Juniors.

Vargas is nicknamed Turbo because of his explosive dribbles and high speed sprints.

== Career ==
=== Club ===
He also played for Defensor Sporting (2002–2004) and the Argentine team Gimnasia y Esgrima La Plata (2005–2006). On 31 August 2007, Vargas signed for FC Sochaux-Montbéliard on loan from AS Monaco. On June 23, 2008, he was presented as the new forward for F.C. Atlas, following Bruno Marioni's departure from the club. He was given the number 9 jersey.

Vargas returned to Argentina to play for Argentinos Juniors on loan for the 2010-11 Argentine Primera División season.

=== National team ===
He has been capped by the Uruguay national side 10 times, and he has scored 3 goals.

=== International goals ===
No.	Date	Venue	Opponent	Score	Result	Competition	Ref.
1	May 23, 2006	Memorial Coliseum, Los Angeles	Romania	1–0	2–0 (W)	Friendly	
2	May 23, 2006	Memorial Coliseum, Los Angeles	Romania	2–0	2–0 (W)	Friendly	
3	February 6, 2007	Estadio General Santander, Cúcuta	Colombia	3–0	3–1 (W)	Friendly	
