= Eduardo Rergis (footballer, born 1980) =

Mexican footballer (born 1980)

Personal information
- Full name: Eduardo Rergis Borja
- Date of birth: 31 December 1980 (age 45)
- Place of birth: Mexico City, Mexico
- Height: 1.78 m (5 ft 10 in)
- Position: Defender

Senior career*
Years	Team	Apps	(Gls)
1997	Veracruz	1	(0)
2000	León	2	(0)
2002–2003	Atlante	49	(6)
2003–2005	Tigres UANL	61	(4)
2005–2006	Pachuca	31	(2)
2006–2007	Atlante	26	(0)
2007–2010	Atlas	37	(2)
2010	Instituto	3	(0)

International career
2003	Mexico	3	(0)
- * Club domestic league appearances and goals as of 3 September 2010

Eduardo Rergis Borja (born 31 December 1980) is a Mexican former professional footballer. Currently he leads the Real Oviedo youth system.

== Career ==
Rergis began his football career in Mexico, playing for Club Atlas before two knee injuries sidelined him for six months at the end of 2009. In July 2010, he returned to playing with Primera B Nacional side Instituto.

== Personal ==
Rergis Borja is the son of Eduardo Rergis, a former Mexican football player and manager.
