= Andrés Ríos (footballer, born 1983) =

Argentine footballer

Personal information
- Full name: Daniel Andrés Ríos
- Date of birth: 21 February 1983 (age 43)
- Place of birth: Córdoba, Argentina
- Height: 1.70 m (5 ft 7 in)
- Position: Striker

Team information
- Current team: América
- Number: 7

Senior career*
Years	Team	Apps	(Gls)
2002–2003	Universitario de Córdoba	?	(?)
2003–2007	Belgrano de Córdoba	82	(12)
2007–2008	Veracruz	12	(5)
2008–2009	Club Toluca	9	(0)
2009	→ Atlas (loan)	4	(0)
2010	Colón de Santa Fe	9	(1)
2010–2013	Belgrano	0	(0)
2014–	América	8	(1)
- * Club domestic league appearances and goals as of 23:07, 11 July 2010 (UTC)

Daniel Andrés Ríos (born 21 February 1983) is an Argentine football striker. He currently plays with Club América.

== Career ==
Ríos started his football career in Universitario de Córdoba in 2002, later being transferred to Belgrano in 2003. He appeared in 20 Argentine Primera División matches during 2006 and 2007, scoring 6 goals.

He later was purchased by Mexican Primera División Tiburones Rojos de Veracruz where he scored 5 goals in 12 matches in the 2007 Apertura, but failed to complete the season due to an injury suffered during a tackle by Felipe Baloy that kept him out for 2 seasons. For the 2008 Apertura he was purchased by Toluca, but only made 5 appearances before once again suffering an injury that kept him out until the 2009 Clausura. He played for Atlas on loan during the 2009–10 season.

On 26 December 2009 Colón de Santa Fe signed the Argentine forward from Veracruz on a 50% joint ownership deal until 2012. However, in 2010 he returned to Belgrano to fight for promotion in the Argentine second division.
