= Hebert Alférez =

Mexican footballer (born 1988)

Personal information
- Full name: Hebert Efraín Alférez Popoca
- Date of birth: 4 June 1988 (age 38)
- Place of birth: Benito Juárez, Quintana Roo, Mexico
- Height: 1.74 m (5 ft 8 1/2 in)
- Position: Centre forward

Youth career
- 2006–2007: Académicos

Senior career*
Years	Team	Apps	(Gls)
2006–2011	Club Atlas	48	(6)
2008–2009	→ Dorados de Sinaloa (loan)	26	(2)
2011	→ HNK Rijeka (loan)	9	(1)
2012	Atlante FC	3	(0)
2012–2014	Lobos de la BUAP	17	(4)
2015	Zacatepec Siglo XXI	4	(0)
2017 2018 barcelona de guayaquil	Loros UdeC	7	(0)
- * Club domestic league appearances and goals as of 4 July 2012

Hebert Efraín Estuardo Alférez Popoca (born 4 June 1988) is a former forward who last played for Loros UdeC on Ascenso MX.

== Career ==
Alférez began his playing career in the Atlas youth teams in 2006. After an impressive performance for Académicos in 5 games, he was called up to the first team and made his professional debut for Atlas on 1 October 2006 in a 1–1 tie against Santos Laguna. He made sporadic appearances thereafter, including one later that season in the Apertura 2006 quarterfinal against América.

He later played for Atlas' Segunda División Profesional, captaining the side to the quarterfinals and semifinals in two seasons. For the Apertura 2008 tournament, he was loaned to Dorados de Sinaloa, where he became a mainstay in the midfield.

For the Apertura 2009 season, Hebert returned to Atlas, promptly re-debuting for the Zorros in the 2009 SuperLiga, against the Kansas City Wizards in a 0–0 draw.

On 10 August 2011 Alférez was transferred on loan to Croatian club HNK Rijeka. Ten days after he debuted against NK Lokomotiva. Alférez scored his only goal on Croatia against NK Zadar on 11 September.

On 14 December 2011 Alférez was transferred to Mexican club Atlante FC. After a short spell playing for Atlante, Alférez continued playing in Lobos BUAP and Zacatepec FC
