= 2015–16 NK Osijek season =

Osijek
2015–16 season
- Chairman: Miroslav Kos
- Manager: Dražen Besek (until 1 September 2015); Zoran Zekić
- Prva HNL: TBD
- Croatian Cup: TBD
Home colours	Away colours

The 2015–16 season will be the 69th season in Osijek’s history and their twenty-fifth in the Prva HNL.

== Competitions ==
=== Overall ===
Competition	Started round	Final result	First match	Last Match
2015-16 Prva HNL	TBD	TBD	11 July	TBD
2015–16 Croatian Football Cup	TBD	TBD	TBD	TBD

=== Prva HNL ===
==== Table ====
Pos	Team	Pld	W	D	L	GF	GA	GD	Pts	Qualification or relegation
6	RNK Split	36	10	16	10	28	29	−1	46	
7	Slaven Belupo	36	10	12	14	41	42	−1	42	
8	Osijek	36	7	13	16	27	49	−22	34	
9	Istra 1961 (O)	36	4	12	20	23	58	−35	24	Qualification for the relegation play-off
10	NK Zagreb (R)	36	3	8	25	27	64	−37	17	Relegation to Croatian Second Football League

Source: PrvaHNL.hr, Soccerway
Rules for classification: 1) Points; 2) Head-to-head points; 3) Head-to-head goal difference; 4) Head-to-head goals scored (at home if two teams tied); 5) Goal difference; 6) Goals scored; 7) Play-off
(Note: Criteria 2–4 and 7 is only used if deciding Champion, teams to international competition or teams for relegation and in that case criteria 6 will not be used).
(O) Play-off winners; (R) Relegated

==== Results summary ====
Overall								Home						Away					
Pld	W	D	L	GF	GA	GD	Pts	W	D	L	GF	GA	GD	W	D	L	GF	GA	GD
4	1	2	1	5	5	0	5	0	2	0	3	3	0	1	0	1	2	2	0

Last updated: 2 Aug 2015.
Source: Competitive matches

==== Results by round ====
Round	1	2	3	4	5	6	7	8	9	10	11	12	13	14	15	16	17	18	19	20	21	22	23	24	25	26	27	28	29	30	31	32	33	34	35	36
Ground	A	H	A	H	A	H	A	A	H	H	A	H	A	H	A	H	H	A	A	H	A	H	A	H	A	A										
Result	W	D	L	D	L	L	L	L	W	D	L	L	L	D	L	W	D	D	W	L	D	D	L	L	D	L										
Position	3	1	5	5																																

Updated to match(es) played on 2 Aug 2015. Source: Competitive matches
A = Away; H = Home; W = Win; D = Draw; L = Loss

== Matches ==
=== Legend ===
Win Draw Loss Postponed

=== Pre-season friendlies ===
27 June 2015	Vasas SC (Hungary)	2–0	Osijek	Budapest
16:00 CET		Sportnet.hr		Stadium: Stadion Rudolf Illovszky

2 July 2015	Osijek	3–0	(Hungary) Paksi SE	Osijek
17:30 CET	Špoljarić 4' (Pen.); Šorša 56'; Radotić 90'	Sportnet.hr		Stadium: Gradski vrt

=== Mid-season friendlies ===
24 March 2016	Osijek	0–1	(Bosnia and Herzegovina) Široki Brijeg	Osijek
14:00 CET		Report	50' Luka Menalo	Stadium: Igralište Kraj Drave; Attendance: 300

=== Prva HNL ===
11 July 2015 1	Zagreb	0–1	Osijek	Zagreb
19:00 CET	M. Šulc (yellow card) 11'; D. Muić (yellow card) 43'	Report	30' Mandić; (yellow card) 45' Kurtović	Stadium: Stadion Kranjčevićeva; Attendance: 500; Referee: M. Strahonja

19 July 2015 2	Osijek	1–1	Dinamo	Osijek
19:00 CET	Radotić 11'; Kurtović (yellow card) 32'; Maslać (yellow card) 58'; Matas (yellow card) 61'	Report	15' Soudani; (yellow card) 50' Ademi; (yellow card) 81' Mățel; (yellow card) 83' Junior Fernandes	Stadium: Gradski vrt Attendance: 4616; Referee: Igor Križarić

25 July 2015 3	RNK Split	2–1	Osijek	Split
21:00 CET	Blagojević 21'; Špehar 24'; Rrahmani (yellow card) 21'; Obšivač (yellow card) 90+2'	Report	(yellow card) 20' Lesjak; 66' Šorša; (yellow card) 72' Aganspahić; (yellow card) 81' Maslać	Stadium: Park Mladeži; Attendance: 800; Referee: Marin Vidulin

1 Aug 2015 4	Osijek	2–2	Istra 1961	Osijek
19:00 CET	Radotić (yellow card) 21'; Matas (yellow card) 62'; Perošević 66'; Lukić (yellow card) 90+6' (goal) 90+6'	Report	(yellow card) 26' Mišić; 55' Repić; 86' (yellow card) 87' Nikolić; (yellow card) 90+3' Franjič	Stadium: Gradski vrt Attendance: 2225; Referee: Željko Frković

9 Aug 2015 5	Slaven Belupo	3–0	Osijek	Koprivnica
21:00 CET	Paracki 35'; Potokar (yellow card) 47'; Radotić 69' (ag.); Delić 84'	Report	(yellow card) 16' Matas; (yellow card) 25' Čuljak; (yellow card) 44' Lukić; (red card) 50' Mandić	Stadium: Gradski stadion Attendance: 883; Referee: Fran Jović

17 Aug 2015 6	Osijek	0–1	Lokomotiva	Osijek
20:00 CET	Lesjak (yellow card) 28'; Šarić (yellow card) 35'; Perošević (yellow card) 41'; Čuljak (yellow card) 78'; Ugarković (yellow card) 88'	Report	(yellow card) 4' Puljić; 61' Doležal; (yellow card) 62' Prenga; (yellow card) 65' Grezda	Stadium: Gradski vrt Attendance: 1.157; Referee: Marko Matoc

23 Aug 2015 7	Hajduk	3–0	Osijek	Split
21:00 CET	Maloku 19'; Bencun (yellow card) 84' (goal) 90+1'; Caktaš 87'	Report	(yellow card) 3' Šorša; (yellow card) 60' Čuljak	Stadium: Poljud; Attendance: 8,500; Referee: Domagoj Vučkov

30 Aug 2015 8	Rijeka	5–0	Osijek	Rijeka
21:00 CET	Samardžić (yellow card) 11'; Balaj 16' 49'; Bezjak 32'; Mitrović 43'; Bradarić (yellow card) 51'; Sharbini 90+3'	Report	(yellow card) 14' Radotić; (yellow card) 17' Roce; (yellow card) 24' Džolan; (yellow card) 74' Lesjak	Stadium: Rujevica; Attendance: 4,729; Referee: Duje Strukan

13 Sep 2015 9	Osijek	3–1	Inter	Osijek
17:00 CET	Perošević 27' (11m) 87' (11m); Škorić (yellow card) 36'; Mandić (yellow card) 47'; Arsenić (yellow card) 75'; Roce (yellow card) 81' (goal) 90+1'	Report	(yellow card) 26' Ottochian; (yellow card) 86' Miletić; (yellow card) 90+1' Blažević; 90+3' (11m) Čeliković	Stadium: Gradski vrt Attendance: 672; Referee: Bruno Marić

18 Sep 2015 10	Osijek	0–0	Zagreb	Osijek
18:00 CET	Roce (yellow card) 17'; Špičić (yellow card) 70'; Škorić (yellow card) 89'	Report		Stadium: Gradski vrt Attendance: 800; Referee: Duje Strukan

25 Sep 2015 11	Dinamo Zagreb	4–1	Osijek	Zagreb
18:00 CET	Hodžić 11' 40'; Henríquez 17' (yellow card) 72'; Machado (yellow card) 63'; Musa 78'	Report	(yellow card) 17' Mikulić; (yellow card) 50' (goal) 83' Grgić	Stadium: Maksimir; Attendance: 526; Referee: Jurica Mihalj

3 Oct 2015 12	Osijek	0–1	Split	Osijek
15:00 CET	Kurtović (yellow card) 25'; Škorić (yellow card) 39'; Perošević (yellow card) 87'; Matas (yellow card) 90+3'	Report	(yellow card) 38' Oremuš; (yellow card) 49' Blagojević; (yellow card) 75' Rugašević; 78' (yellow card) 83' Bagarić	Stadium: Gradski vrt Attendance: 584; Referee: Marin Vidulin

17 Oct 2015 13	Istra	2–1	Osijek	Pula
15:00 CET	Zlomislić (yellow card) 23'; Žižić (yellow card) 57'; Svraka 63'; Bouhna; Kasalica (yellow card) 85'	Report	(yellow card) 13' (goal) 58' Roce; (yellow card) 17' Lesjak; 54 Cvejba	Stadium: Stadion Aldo Drosina; Attendance: 758; Referee: Željko Frković

23 Oct 2015 14	Osijek	0–0	Slaven Belupo	Osijek
18:00 CET	Arsenić (yellow card) 15'; Špičić (yellow card) 33'; Šarić (yellow card) 70'; Čuljak (yellow card) 89'	Report	(yellow card) 76' Crepulja; (yellow card) 80' Međimorec	Stadium: Gradski vrt Attendance: 627; Referee: Duje Strukan

31 Oct 2015 15	Lokomotiva	2–1	Osijek	Zagreb
15:00 CET	Marić 6' 53'; Fiolić (yellow card) 42'; Barišić (yellow card) 64'; Leko (yellow card) 82'	Report	15' (yellow card) 15' Škorić; (yellow card) 48' Kurtović	Stadium: Stadion Kranjčevićeva; Attendance: 327; Referee: Bruno Marić

7 Nov 2015 16	Osijek	1–0	Hajduk	Osijek
15:00 CET	Šarić 41' (yellow card) 90+3'; Lukić (yellow card) 56'; Špoljarić (yellow card) 90+4'	Report	(yellow card) 90+2' Sušić	Stadium: Gradski vrt Attendance: 2,487; Referee: Dalibor Mlakar

21 Nov 2015 17	Osijek	1–1	Rijeka	Osijek
15:00 CET	Škorić 90+4'	Report	(yellow card) 29' (goal) 45' Bezjak; (yellow card) 41' Maleš; (yellow card) 73' Močinić; (yellow card) 79' Samardžić; (yellow card) 90+3' Bradarić	Stadium: Gradski vrt Attendance: 517; Referee: Marko Matoc

27 Nov 2015 18	Inter	0–0	Osijek	Zaprešić
16:00 CET	Ćosić (yellow card) 57'	Report	(yellow card) 40' Špičić	Stadium: Stadion ŠRC Zaprešić; Attendance: 450; Referee: Bruno Marić

6 Dez 2015 19	Zagreb	0–1	Osijek	Zagreb
15:00 CET	Konopek (yellow card) 76'; Muić (yellow card) 90+1'	Report	22' (yellow card) 56' Šarić; (yellow card) 54' Roce; (yellow card) 84' Kurtović	Stadium: Stadion Kranjčevićeva; Attendance: 340; Referee: Goran Gabrilo

13 Dez 2015 20	Osijek	0–1	Dinamo	Osijek
15:00 CET	Arsenić (yellow card) 10'; Kurtović (yellow card) 51'; Lukić (yellow card) 70'; Matas (yellow card) 78'	Report	41' Pjaca; (yellow card) 59' Henríquez	Stadium: Gradski vrt Attendance: 1,677; Referee: Mario Zebec

20 Dez 2015 21	Split	1–1	Osijek	Split
17:00 CET	Vidović (yellow card) 31'; Matas 89' (ag.)	Report	76' (yellow card) 76' Grgić	Stadium: Stadion Park Mladeži; Attendance: 400; Referee: Dalibor Mlakar

13 Feb 2016 22	Osijek	0–0	Istra	Osijek
15:00 CET	Šorša (yellow card) 32'; Lukić (yellow card) 39'; Kurtović (yellow card) 87'; Škorić (yellow card) 90+1'	Report	(yellow card) 23' Gojković; (yellow card) 28' Heister; (yellow card) 47' Zlomislić; (yellow card) 81' Bouhna	Stadium: Gradski vrt Attendance: 2,000; Referee: Mario Zebec

21 Feb 2016 23	Slaven Belupo	1–0	Osijek	Koprivnica
15:00 CET	Jambor (yellow card) 35'; Ozobić 38'; Savić (yellow card) 89'	Report	(yellow card) 19' Šarić; (yellow card) 76' Kurtović; (yellow card) 80' Vojnović	Stadium: Gradski stadion Attendance: 905; Referee: Jurica Mihalj

27 Feb 2016 24	Osijek	1–3	Lokomotiva	Osijek
15:00 CET	Kurtović (yellow card) 40'; Perošević (yellow card) 45+3' (goal) 81' (11m); Roce (yellow card) 54'; Grgić (yellow card) 70'	Report	6' 90' Grezda; (red card) 68' Fiolić; (yellow card) 70' Capan; (yellow card) 83' Barišić; 83' Andrijašević	Stadium: Gradski vrt Attendance: 2,000; Referee: Marko Matoc

1 March 2016 25	Hajduk	2–2	Osijek	Split
19:00 CET	Sušić 11' (yellow card) 89'; Nižić 36'; Juranović (yellow card) 40'; Jefferson (yellow card) 86'	Report	7' Šorša; (yellow card) 33' Knežević; (yellow card) 46' Lesjak; (yellow card) 50' Škorić; (yellow card) 72' Matas; 90+5' Mioč	Stadium: Stadion Poljud; Attendance: 6,961; Referee: Ivan Bebek

6 March 2016 26	Rijeka	2–1	Osijek	Rijeka
17:00 CET	Samardžić (yellow card) 39'; Bezjak (yellow card) 45' (goal) 90+3'; Gavranović 52'; Močinić (yellow card) 80'; Maleš (yellow card) 87'	Report	(yellow card) 15' Šarić; (yellow card) 32' Šorša; (yellow card) 60' Grgić; (yellow card) 80' Roce; (yellow card) 85' Špičić; 89' (11m) Perošević	Stadium: Stadion Rujevica; Attendance: 3,100; Referee: Fran Jović

11 March 2016 27	Osijek	1–0	Inter Zaprešić	Osijek
18:00 CET	Grgić 9'; Matas (yellow card) 28'; Lukić (yellow card) 52'; Perošević (yellow card) 80'; Čuljak (yellow card) 90+1'	Report	(yellow card) 27' Čeliković; (yellow card) 60' Blažević; (red card) Nestorovski; (yellow card) 90+6' Čović	Stadium: Gradski vrt Attendance: 953; Referee: Mario Zebec

18 March 2016 28	Osijek	2–0	Zagreb	Osijek
19:00 CET	Škorić (yellow card) 5'; Grgić 22' 47' (yellow card) 69'; Radotić (yellow card) 62'; Mioč (yellow card) 78'; Matas (yellow card) 81'	Report	(yellow card) 14' Stepčić; (yellow card) 55' Jurilj; (yellow card) 84' Strasser	Stadium: Gradski vrt Attendance: 1,009; Referee: Bruno Marić

3 April 2016 29	Dinamo Zagreb	3–0	Osijek	Zagreb
15:00 CEST (UTC+02:00)	Machado (yellow card) 25'; Taravel 36' (yellow card) 79'; Fernandes (penalty missed) 42' 90+2'; Henríquez 65' (yellow card) 66'	Report	Vojnović (yellow card) 35'; Škorić (yellow card) 42'	Stadium: Stadion Maksimir; Attendance: 2,238; Referee: Igor Križarić (Čakovec)

8 April 2016 30	Osijek	0–0	Split	Osijek
18:00 CET	Vojnović (yellow card) 27'; Šorša (yellow card) 72'	Report	(yellow card) 14' Obšivač; (yellow card) 19' Blagojević	Stadium: Stadion Gradski vrt Attendance: 926; Referee: Ivan Bebek

15 April 2016 31	Istra	0–0	Osijek	Pula
20:00 CET	Žižić (yellow card) 23'; Hadžić (yellow card) 72'; Repić (yellow card) 89'; Gržan (yellow card) 90+4'	Report	(yellow card) 9' Kurtović; (yellow card) 60' Šorša; (yellow card) 90+2' Roce	Stadium: Aldo Drosina; Attendance: 1,137; Referee: Fran Jović

21 April 2016 32	Osijek	0–0	Slaven Belupo	Osijek
19:00 CET	Arsenić (yellow card) 8'; Škorić (yellow card) 68'; Vojnović (yellow card) 77'	Report	(yellow card) 40' Paracki; (yellow card) 73' Burić	Stadium: Stadion Gradski vrt Attendance: 1,500; Referee: Duje Strukan

24 April 2016 33	Lokomotiva	2–0	Osijek	Zagreb
19:00 CET	Aralica 72' (yellow card) 73'; Arsenić 86' (ag.)	Report	(yellow card) 23' (yellow-red card) 48' Špičić; (yellow card) 51' Matas	Stadium: Stadion Kranjčevićeva; Attendance: 341; Referee: Marin Vidulin

1 May 2016 34	Osijek	2–1	Hajduk	Osijek
15:00 CET	Arsenić (yellow card) 39'; Knežević 50', 74'; Radotić (yellow card) 52'; Čuljak (yellow card) 60'; Vojnović (yellow card) 61'; Grgić (yellow card) 65'; Mandić (yellow card) 90+1'	Report	(yellow card) 60' (goal) 84' (pen.) Sušić; (yellow card) 82' Mastelić; (yellow card) 85' Jefferson	Stadium: Stadion Gradski vrt Attendance: 1,899; Referee: Igor Pajač

7 May 2016 35	Osijek	1–1	Rijeka	Osijek
19:00 CET	Perošević (yellow card) 17'; Knežević (yellow card) 34'; Špoljarić (yellow card) 61'; Vojnović (yellow card) 77'; Lukić 90' (yellow card) 90'	Report	(yellow card) 25' Močinić; 54' Gavranović; (yellow card) 65' Bradarić	Stadium: Stadion Gradski vrt Attendance: 1,712; Referee: Bruno Marić

13 May 2016 36	Inter	4–2	Osijek	Zaprešić
17:00 CET	Nestorovski 40' 51' 85'; Čeliković (yellow card) 49'; Bokčaj 90+4'	Report	(yellow card) 39' Mikulić; 52' Perošević; 81' Žaper; (yellow card) 85' Lesjak	Stadium: ŠRC Zaprešić; Attendance: 347; Referee: Ivan Bebek

=== Croatian Football Cup ===
22 September 2015 R1	NK Duga Resa 1929	1–3	Osijek	Duga Resa
15:30 CET	Stanković (yellow card) 7'; Borovac (yellow card) 87'; Grčić 89'	Report	(yellow card) 6' (goal) 81' Šarić; 21' (yellow card) 38' (goal) 47' Perošević; (yellow card) 85' Mihaljević	Attendance: 1,200; Referee: Marko Matoc

28 October 2015 R2	HAŠK	0–2	Osijek	Zagreb
14:00 CET	Blaškić (yellow card) 67'; Grčić (yellow card) 79'	Report	(yellow card) 24' Tsveiba; (yellow card) 64' Matas; (yellow card) 65' Anić; 69' Štrkalj; 78' Mandić	Stadium: Stadion na Peščenici; Attendance: 300; Referee: Marijo Strahonja

2 December 2015 QF	Slaven Belupo	1–1 (4–1 p)	Osijek	Koprivnica
15:30 CET	Ejupi (yellow card) 22'; Savić 47'	Report	(yellow card) 17' Škorić; (yellow card) 24' Grgić; (yellow card) 38' Matas; 54' Lesjak; (yellow card) 59' Špoljarić; (yellow card) 90+2' (yellow card) 90+2' (yellow-red card) Perošević; (yellow card) 90+4' Arsenić	Stadium: Gradski Stadion; Attendance: 688; Referee: Jurica Mihalj
	Penalties
	Ejupi (penalty scored); Ozobić (penalty scored); Crepulja (penalty scored); Paracki (penalty scored)		Škorić (penalty missed); Lukić (penalty scored); Šarić (penalty missed)

== Player seasonal records ==
Competitive matches only. Updated to games played 14 May 2016.

=== Top scorers ===
Rank	Name	League	Cup	Total
1.	(Croatia) Antonio Perošević	6	2	8
2.	(Croatia) Alen Grgić	5	0	5
3.	(Croatia) Tomislav Šarić	2	1	3
3.	(Croatia) Andrej Lukić	2	1	3
4.	(Croatia) Goran Roce	2	0	2
4.	(Croatia) Mile Škorić	2	0	2
4.	(Croatia) Nikola Mandić	1	1	2
4.	(Croatia) Tomislav Šorša	2	0	2
4.	(Croatia) Josip Knežević	2	0	2
5.	(Croatia) Tomislav Radotić	1	0	1
5.	(Croatia) Tomislav Štrkalj	0	1	1
5.	(Croatia) Zoran Lesjak	0	1	1
5.	(Croatia) Benedik Mioč	1	0	1
5.	(Croatia) Mihael Žaper	1	0	1
	TOTALS	5	TBD	5

Source: Competitive matches

== Transfers ==
=== In ===
Date	Position	Player	From	Fee
June 2015	DF	(Croatia) Tomislav Radotić	RNK Split	TBF
June 2015	DF	(Serbia) Mario Maslać	Borac Čačak	Free
July 2015	MF	(Croatia) Zoran Lesjak	NK Hrvatski Dragovoljac	Free
July 2015	MF	(Croatia) Luka Mihaljević	NK Istra 1961 II	Free
July 2015	TBF	(Croatia) Matija Čakalić	NK Metalac Osijek	TBF
July 2015	TBF	(Croatia) Matej Bekavac	NK Metalac Osijek	TBF
July 2015	TBF	(Croatia) Ivica Đolan	NK Rudeš	TBF
July 2015	TBF	(Croatia) Ivica Bukvič	NK Hrvatski Dragovoljac	TBF
August 2015	FW	(Croatia) Goran Roce	RNK Split	Free

=== Out ===
Date	Position	Player	To	Fee
Jul 1, 2015	FW	(Croatia) Aljoša Vojnović	Dinamo București	End of contract
Jul 1, 2015	FW	(Croatia) Ivan Baraban	NK Široki Brijeg	End of contract
Jul 1, 2015	TBF	(Croatia) Slavko Bralić	NK Široki Brijeg	TBF

=== Loans in ===
Date	Position	Player	From	Until
July 2015	MF	(Croatia) Tomislav Šarić	Parma	End of season

=== Loans out ===
Date	Position	Player	To	Until
TBD	TBD			TBD
