= 2014–15 NK Osijek season =

Osijek
2014–15 season
- Chairman: Slobodan Tolj (until 8 April 2015); Miroslav Kos
- Manager: Tomislav Rukavina (until 11 February 2015); Ivo Šušak
- Prva HNL: 8th
- Croatian Cup: 1/8 final
- Top goalscorer: League: Antonio Perošević (6) Aljoša Vojnović (6); All: Antonio Perošević (6) Aljoša Vojnović (6)
- Highest home attendance: 7,000 v Istra 1961, 17 May 2015
- Lowest home attendance: 700 v Lokomotiva, 13 December 2014
| Home colours | Away colours |

The 2014–15 season is the 68th season in Osijek’s history and their twenty-fourth in the Prva HNL.

== First-team squad ==
As of 19 April 2015

Note: Flags indicate national team as defined under FIFA eligibility rules; some limited exceptions apply. Players may hold more than one non-FIFA nationality.

| No. | Pos. | Nation | Player |
|---|---|---|---|
| 1 | GK | CRO | Zvonimir Mikulić |
| 2 | DF | URU | Federico Platero (on loan from FC Wil 1900) |
| 3 | DF | CRO | Zoran Arsenić |
| 4 | MF | CRO | Hrvoje Kurtović |
| 5 | DF | CRO | Slavko Bralić |
| 6 | DF | CRO | Jurica Pranjić |
| 7 | DF | CRO | Davor Špehar |
| 8 | MF | CRO | Aljoša Vojnović |
| 9 | FW | BIH | Jasmin Mešanović |
| 10 | FW | CRO | Antonio Perošević |
| 11 | MF | CRO | Josip Špoljarić |
| 12 | GK | CRO | Borna Žitnjak |
| 13 | GK | CRO | Filip Lončarić |
| 14 | DF | CRO | Neven Laštro |
| 15 | MF | CRO | Frane Vitaić |
| 16 | MF | CRO | Andrej Lukić |

| No. | Pos. | Nation | Player |
|---|---|---|---|
| 17 | MF | BIH | Nermin Jamak |
| 18 | MF | CRO | Marin Glavaš |
| 19 | DF | CRO | Borna Barišić |
| 20 | DF | BIH | Jozo Špikić (on loan from HNK Rijeka) |
| 21 | MF | CRO | Mile Škorić |
| 22 | MF | CRO | Tomislav Šorša |
| 23 | MF | SRB | Dragomir Vukobratović |
| 24 | FW | BIH | Almir Aganspahić |
| 25 | FW | CRO | Nikola Mandić |
| 26 | DF | CRO | Nikola Matas |
| 27 | DF | CRO | Tomislav Čuljak |
| 28 | MF | BUL | Daniel Peev |
| 29 | FW | CRO | Josip Čikvar |
| 30 | FW | URU | Sasha Aneff (on loan from NK Domžale) |
| 99 | FW | CRO | Marko Mrkonjić |

== Competitions ==
=== Overall ===
| Competition | Started round | Final result | First match | Last Match |
|---|---|---|---|---|
| 2014–15 Prva HNL | – | 8th | 19 July | 30 May |
| 2014–15 Croatian Football Cup | 1/16 final | 1/8 final | 24 September | 29 October |

=== Prva HNL ===
==== Classification ====
| Pos | Team | Pld | W | D | L | GF | GA | GD | Pts | Qualification or relegation |
|---|---|---|---|---|---|---|---|---|---|---|
| 6 | Slaven Belupo | 36 | 11 | 9 | 16 | 38 | 49 | −11 | 42 | |
| 7 | RNK Split | 36 | 9 | 14 | 13 | 42 | 49 | −7 | 41 | |
| 8 | Osijek | 36 | 10 | 6 | 20 | 42 | 59 | −17 | 36 | |
| 9 | Istra 1961 | 36 | 7 | 14 | 15 | 36 | 59 | −23 | 35 | Qualification to relegation play-off |
| 10 | Zadar (R) | 36 | 8 | 8 | 20 | 37 | 75 | −38 | 32 | Relegation to Croatian Second Football League |

Source: Sportnet.hr
Rules for classification: 1) points; 2) goal difference; 3) number of goals scored.
For deciding champions, qualification to UEFA Europa League and relegation: 1st points; 2nd head-to-head points; 3rd head-to-head goal difference; 4th head-to-head away goals scored
(R) Relegated

==== Results summary ====
| Overall | | | | | | | | Home | | | | | | Away | | | | | |
| Pld | W | D | L | GF | GA | GD | Pts | W | D | L | GF | GA | GD | W | D | L | GF | GA | GD |
|---|---|---|---|---|---|---|---|---|---|---|---|---|---|---|---|---|---|---|---|
| 36 | 10 | 6 | 20 | 42 | 59 | −17 | 36 | 8 | 4 | 6 | 25 | 20 | +5 | 2 | 2 | 14 | 17 | 39 | −22 |

Last updated: 30 May 2015.
Source: Sportnet.hr

==== Results by round ====
| Round | 1 | 2 | 3 | 4 | 5 | 6 | 7 | 8 | 9 | 10 | 11 | 12 | 13 | 14 | 15 | 16 | 17 | 18 | 19 | 20 | 21 | 22 | 23 | 24 | 25 | 26 | 27 | 28 | 29 | 30 | 31 | 32 | 33 | 34 | 35 | 36 |
|---|---|---|---|---|---|---|---|---|---|---|---|---|---|---|---|---|---|---|---|---|---|---|---|---|---|---|---|---|---|---|---|---|---|---|---|---|
| Ground | H | A | H | H | A | H | A | H | A | A | H | A | A | H | A | H | A | H | H | A | H | H | A | H | A | H | A | A | H | A | A | H | A | H | A | H |
| Result | L | L | D | L | W | W | D | L | L | L | W | L | L | W | L | D | L | L | L | L | W | D | W | L | L | D | L | D | W | L | L | W | L | W | L | W |
| Position | 9 | 10 | 10 | 10 | 6 | 5 | 7 | 8 | 9 | 9 | 7 | 8 | 8 | 8 | 8 | 9 | 9 | 9 | 9 | 10 | 9 | 8 | 8 | 8 | 8 | 8 | 10 | 10 | 9 | 9 | 9 | 9 | 10 | 9 | 9 | 8 |

Updated to match(es) played on 30 May 2015. Source: Competitive matches
A = Away; H = Home; W = Win; D = Draw; L = Loss

== Matches ==
=== Legend ===
Win Draw Loss Postponed

=== Prva HNL ===
| 19 July 2014 1 | Osijek | 1 – 4 | Lokomotiva | Osijek |
| 21:00 CET | Kurtović (yellow card) 59'; J. Barišić 62'; Bralić (yellow card) 80' (yellow card) 83' (yellow-red card) | Report | 4' Pavičić; 38' Pajač; 65' 88' Budimir | Stadium: Stadion Gradski vrt Attendance: 3,000; Referee: D. Vučkov |

| 26 July 2014 2 | Zadar | 2 – 1 | Osijek | Zadar |
| 21:00 CET | Ivančić 35' (yellow card) 78'; Weitzer 65'; Muić (yellow card) 69'; Šimurina (yellow card) 90+3' | Report | (yellow card) 68' Škorić; (yellow card) 73' Kurtović; 90+3' (pen.) J. Barišić | Stadium: Stadion Stanovi; Attendance: 1,000; Referee: B. Marić |

| 3 August 2014 3 | Osijek | 1 – 1 | Split | Osijek |
| 19:00 CET | Mišić 20' | Report | 18' Glavina | Stadium: Stadion Gradski vrt Attendance: 1,500; Referee: I. Križarić |

| 9 August 2014 4 | Osijek | 1 – 2 | Dinamo Zagreb | Osijek |
| 21:00 CET | Špehar (yellow card) 23'; Bralić (yellow card) 71'; J. Barišić 79' (pen.) | Report | 15' 72' (pen.) Čop; (yellow card) 22' Santos; (yellow card) 90+1' Ibáñez | Stadium: Stadion Gradski vrt Attendance: 4,000; Referee: G. Gabrilo |

| 17 August 2014 5 | Zagreb | 1 – 2 | Osijek | Zagreb |
| 19:00 CET | Jurendić 29' (pen.); Musa (yellow card) 58' | Report | 16' 87' Jonjić; (yellow card) 42' Mišić; (yellow card) 77' Vitaić; (yellow card) 85' Škorić | Stadium: Stadion Kranjčevićeva; Referee: M. Zebec |

| 24 August 2014 6 | Osijek | 2 – 0 | Hajduk Split | Osijek |
| 19:00 CET | Kurtović (yellow card) 17'; Baraban 27'; Mišić (yellow card) 32'; Mešanović (yellow card) 57'; Glavaš 73'; Jonjić (yellow card) 76' | Report | (yellow card) 29' Vuković; (yellow card) 87' Mikanović | Stadium: Stadion Gradski vrt Attendance: 5,000; Referee: M. Strahonja |

| 29 August 2014 7 | Istra 1961 | 0 – 0 | Osijek | Pula |
| 20:15 CET | Vukman (yellow card) | Report | (yellow card) B. Barišić | Stadium: Stadion Aldo Drosina; Attendance: 1,300; Referee: I. Križarić |

| 13 September 2014 8 | Osijek | 0 – 1 | Rijeka | Osijek |
| 16:00 CET | Jonjić (yellow card) 57' | Report | 19' Jugović; (yellow card) 24' Jajalo; (yellow card) 44' Lešković; (yellow card) 74' Krstanović | Stadium: Stadion Gradski vrt Attendance: 1,500; Referee: M. Zebec |

| 21 September 2014 9 | Slaven Belupo | 2 – 0 | Osijek | Koprivnica |
| 16:00 CET | Ozobić 43'; Edson (yellow card) 64'; Cesarec (yellow card) 66'; Jonjić 73' (o.g.) | Report | (yellow card) 38' Škorić; (yellow card) 63' Kurtović; (yellow card) 65' Perošević; (yellow card) 78' Jonjić | Stadium: Gradski stadion Attendance: 1,800; Referee: M. Strahonja |

| 28 September 2014 10 | Lokomotiva | 2 – 0 | Osijek | Zagreb |
| 16:00 CET | Pavičić 46' 86' | Report | | Stadium: Stadion Kranjčevićeva; Attendance: 300; Referee: M. Vidulin |

| 4 October 2014 11 | Osijek | 4 – 1 | Zadar | Osijek |
| 15:00 CET | Mešanović 29' 49'; Novaković 61'; Baraban 85' | Report | 66' Ikić | Stadium: Stadion Gradski vrt Attendance: 1,000; Referee: D. Mlakar |

| 17 October 2014 12 | Split | 3 – 0 | Osijek | Split |
| 18:00 CET | Cikalleshi 33' (pen.); Roce 35' 44' | Report | | Stadium: Stadion Park mladeži Attendance: 500; Referee: I. Križarić |

| 26 October 2014 13 | Dinamo Zagreb | 5 – 0 | Osijek | Zagreb |
| 15:00 CET | Čop 10'; Taravel 51'; Soudani 53' 70'; Šimunović (yellow card) 60'; Fernándes 62'; Andrijašević (yellow card) 89' | Report | (yellow card) 31' Mešanović | Stadium: Stadion Maksimir; Attendance: 2,000; Referee: M. Zebec |

| 2 November 2014 14 | Osijek | 1 – 0 | Zagreb | Osijek |
| 15:00 CET | Perošević (red card) 18'; B. Barišić (yellow card) 18' (goal) 33' (pen.); J. Mišić (yellow card) 26' (yellow card) 84' (yellow-red card); Mešanović (yellow card) 48' | Report | (yellow card) 60' Kolinger; (yellow card) 90' Matić | Stadium: Stadion Gradski vrt Attendance: 1,500; Referee: I. Bebek |

| 8 November 2014 15 | Hajduk Split | 2 – 1 | Osijek | Split |
| 19:00 CET | Caktaš 54' (pen.) (yellow card) 60'; Gotal 63'; Nižić (yellow card) 68'; Bradarić (yellow card) 70'; Milevskyi (yellow card) 78' | Report | (yellow card) 33' Šorša; (yellow card) 53' Jonjić; 67' Glavaš; (yellow card) 75' Pavić; (yellow card) 78' (yellow card) 85' (yellow-red card) Škorić | Stadium: Stadion Poljud; Attendance: 0 Referee: M. Vidulin |

| 21 November 2014 16 | Osijek | 1 – 1 | Istra 1961 | Osijek |
| 20:00 CET | Pavić (yellow card) 27'; Glavaš (yellow card) 37'; Mišić (yellow card) 56'; Mešanović (yellow card) 59'; Jonjić 71'; Špehar (yellow card) 78' | Report | (yellow card) 27' Jô; 64' (yellow card) 73' Radonjić; (yellow card) 89' Blagojević | Stadium: Stadion Gradski vrt Attendance: 1,200; Referee: F. Jović |

| 1 December 2014 17 | Rijeka | 2 – 1 | Osijek | Rijeka |
| 18:00 CET | Samardžić 12' (yellow card) 71'; Moisés 62'; Močinić (yellow card) 79' | Report | (yellow card) 47' Glavaš; 73' Jonjić; (yellow card) 86' Šorša; (yellow card) 90' Mioč | Stadium: Stadion Kantrida; Attendance: 4,000; Referee: D. Strukan |

| 7 December 2014 18 | Osijek | 2 – 3 | Slaven Belupo | Osijek |
| 15:00 CET | Barišić (yellow card) 10'; Glavaš (yellow card) 15'; Mešanović 84'; Škorić 87' | Report | 14' (pen.) (yellow card) 25' (goal) 56' Mirić; (yellow card) 31' Crepulja; 44' Ozobić; (yellow card) 90+2' Fuštar | Stadium: Stadion Gradski vrt Attendance: 900; Referee: M.Strahonja |

| 13 December 2014 19 | Osijek | 0 – 2 | Lokomotiva | Osijek |
| 15:00 CET | Jamak (yellow card) 39'; Matas (yellow card) 45'; Špehar (yellow card) 71'; Škorić (yellow card) 90'; Mikulić (yellow card) 90' | Report | 20' (yellow card) 59' Marić; (yellow card) 43' Bručić; (yellow card) 75' Prenga; (yellow card) 76' Biljan; (yellow card) 82' (goal) 90+4' Kolar | Stadium: Stadion Gradski vrt Attendance: 700; Referee: I. Križarić |

| 8 February 2015 20 | Zadar | 3 – 1 | Osijek | Zadar |
| 15:00 CET | Pešić 9'; Čirjak 23' (pen.); Banović 66' | Report | 3' Laštro | Stadium: Stadion Stanovi; Attendance: 1,200; Referee: I. Bebek |

| 14 February 2015 21 | Osijek | 4 – 0 | Split | Osijek |
| 15:00 CET | Perošević 34' (yellow card) 35'; Škorić 67' 83' (pen.); Vojnović 72' | Report | (yellow card) 66' Blagojević; (yellow card) 89' Barbarić | Stadium: Stadion Gradski vrt Referee: M. Strahonja |

| 22 February 2015 22 | Osijek | 1 – 1 | Dinamo Zagreb | Osijek |
| 15:00 CET | Matas (yellow card) 80'; Mešanović 84' | Report | 26' Pavičić; (yellow card) 80' Henríquez; (yellow card) 87' Sigali | Stadium: Stadion Gradski vrt Attendance: 4,000; Referee: B. Marić |

| 1 March 2015 23 | Zagreb | 0 – 4 | Osijek | Zagreb |
| 15:00 CET | Musa (yellow card) 48' | Report | (yellow card) 10' Laštro; 37' Perošević; 59' 68' 82' Vojnović | Stadium: Stadion Kranjčevićeva; Referee: G. Gabrilo |

| 8 March 2015 24 | Osijek | 0 – 1 | Hajduk Split | Osijek |
| 15:00 CET | Vukobratović (yellow card) 60'; Laštro (yellow card) 64'; Mešanović (yellow card) 76' | Report | (yellow card) 22' Mezga; 45+2' Balić; (yellow card) 90' Maloča | Stadium: Stadion Gradski vrt Attendance: 6,000; Referee: D. Vučkov |

| 15 March 2015 25 | Istra 1961 | 1 – 0 | Osijek | Pula |
| 15:00 CET | Jo (yellow card) 18'; Špehar 87' | Report | (yellow card) 74' Šorša; (yellow card) 77' Vojnović | Stadium: Stadion Aldo Drosina; Attendance: 1,500; Referee: F. Jović |

| 20 March 2015 26 | Osijek | 0 – 0 | Rijeka | Osijek |
| 18:00 CET | Jamak (yellow card) 38'; Kurtović (yellow card) 61'; Barišić (yellow card) 80' | Report | (yellow card) 83' Mitrović | Stadium: Stadion Gradski vrt Attendance: 2,000; Referee: M. Strahonja |

| 2 April 2015 27 | Slaven Belupo | 2 – 1 | Osijek | Koprivnica |
| 17:00 CET | Mihaljević 17'; Crepulja 89' | Report | 14' Peev | Stadium: Gradski stadion Attendance: 800; Referee: G. Gabrilo |

| 10 April 2015 28 | Lokomotiva | 2 – 2 | Osijek | Zagreb |
| 18:00 CET | Rukavina 28'; Begonja (yellow card) 46'; Andrijašević 49'; Bartolec (yellow card) 67' | Report | (yellow card) 38' Mešanović; 48' Aneff; 72' Vojnović; (yellow card) 86' Glavaš | Stadium: Stadion Kranjčevićeva; Referee: M. Vidulin |

| 19 April 2015 29 | Osijek | 2 – 1 | Zadar | Osijek |
| 17:00 CET | Perošević 6'; Matas (yellow card) 58'; Laštro 90+2' | Report | 23' Pešić; (yellow card) 31' (yellow card) 82' (yellow-red card) Terkeš; (yellow card) 90+1' Ikić | Stadium: Stadion Gradski vrt Attendance: 3,000; Referee: F. Jović |

| 25 April 2015 30 | Split | 3 – 2 | Osijek | Split |
| 17:00 CET | Mršić (yellow card) 9'; Bagarić 55' (yellow card) 90+2'; Woon (yellow card) 69'; Blagojević 72'; Rog (yellow card) 83'; Cikalleshi 85' | Report | 11' (yellow card) 30' Aneff; 13' (yellow card) 56' Glavaš; (yellow card) 20' Jamak; (yellow card) 36' Pavić | Stadium: Stadion Park mladeži Attendance: 800; Referee: D. Vučkov |

| 28 April 2015 31 | Dinamo Zagreb | 3 – 0 | Osijek | Zagreb |
| 18:00 CET | Pavičić 20'; Henríquez 50'; Soudani (yellow card) 55'; Ćorić 77' | Report | (yellow card) 51' Jamak; (yellow card) 68' Šorša | Stadium: Stadion Maksimir; Attendance: 1,254; Referee: D. Strukan |

| 2 May 2015 32 | Osijek | 1 – 0 | Zagreb | Osijek |
| 17:00 CET | Škorić 17'; Lukić (yellow card) 45'; Matas (yellow card) 45+1'; Jamak (yellow card) 71'; Perošević (yellow card) 75' | Report | (yellow card) 24' Kolinger; (yellow card) 84' Štiglec | Stadium: Stadion Gradski vrt Attendance: 1,500; Referee: I. Bebek |

| 9 May 2015 33 | Hajduk Split | 3 – 2 | Osijek | Split |
| 19:00 CET | Gotal 5'; Balić 64'; Caktaš 71' | Report | (yellow card) 14' Čuljak; (yellow card) 20' Bralić; (yellow card) 61' Vojnović; (yellow card) 64' Lukić; 67' Glavaš; 85' Špoljarić | Stadium: Stadion Poljud; Attendance: 3,000 |

| 17 May 2015 34 | Osijek | 1 – 0 | Istra 1961 | Osijek |
| 17:00 CET | Perošević 47'; Lukić (yellow card) 49'; Čuljak (yellow card) 59'; Škorić (yellow card) 75'; Aneff (yellow card) 90' | Report | (yellow card) 39' Jo | Stadium: Stadion Gradski vrt Attendance: 7,000; Referee: M. Zebec |

| 23 May 2015 35 | Rijeka | 3 – 0 | Osijek | Rijeka |
| 19:00 CET | Balaj 18'; Sharbini 34' (pen.); Leovac (yellow card) 50'; Tomasov 66' | Report | (yellow card) 32' (yellow card) 60' (yellow-red card) Bralić | Stadium: Stadion Kantrida; Attendance: 6,000; Referee: M. Vidulin |

| 30 May 2015 36 | Osijek | 3 – 2 | Slaven Belupo | Osijek |
| 19:00 CET | Perošević 19' 38'; Vojnović 87' (pen.) | Report | 5' Delić; (yellow card) 58' (goal) 75' (yellow card) 87' (yellow-red card) Peričić | Stadium: Stadion Gradski vrt Attendance: 7,000; Referee: F. Jović |

=== Croatian Football Cup ===
| 24 September 2014 1/16 final | Vuteks Sloga | 0 – 3 | Osijek | Vukovar |
| 15:30 CET | Arsić (yellow card) 28'; Majher (yellow card) 30'; Kisilj (yellow card) 44' | Report | (yellow card) 27' Perošević; 46' Mioč; 65' Šorša; (yellow card) 71' (goal) 76' Jonjić | Stadium: Vuteksov stadion na Sajmištu; Attendance: 600; Referee: I. Pajač |

| 29 October 2014 1/8 final | Split | 2 – 0 | Osijek | Split |
| 17:00 CET | Roce 9'; Cikalleshi 32' | Report | | Stadium: Stadion Park Mladeži |

== Player seasonal records ==
Competitive matches only. Updated to games played 30 May 2015.

=== Top scorers ===
| Rank | Name | League | Cup | Total |
|---|---|---|---|---|
| 1 | (Croatia) Antonio Perošević | 6 | - | 6 |
| 1 | (Croatia) Aljoša Vojnović | 6 | - | 6 |
| 2 | (Croatia) Matej Jonjić | 4 | 1 | 5 |
| 3 | (Bosnia and Herzegovina) Jasmin Mešanović | 4 | - | 4 |
| 3 | (Croatia) Mile Škorić | 4 | - | 4 |
| 3 | (Croatia) Marin Glavaš | 4 | - | 4 |
| 4 | (Croatia) Josip Barišić | 3 | - | 3 |
| 5 | (Croatia) Ivan Baraban | 2 | - | 2 |
| 5 | (Bosnia and Herzegovina) Neven Laštro | 2 | - | 2 |
| 5 | (Uruguay) Sasha Aneff | 2 | - | 2 |
| 6 | (Croatia) Josip Mišić | 1 | - | 1 |
| 6 | (Croatia) Borna Barišić | 1 | - | 1 |
| 6 | (Croatia) Benedik Mioč | - | 1 | 1 |
| 6 | (Croatia) Tomislav Šorša | - | 1 | 1 |
| 6 | (Croatia) Saša Novaković | 1 | - | 1 |
| 6 | (Bulgaria) Daniel Peev | 1 | - | 1 |
| 6 | (Croatia) Josip Špoljarić | 1 | - | 1 |
| | TOTALS | 42 | 3 | 45 |

Source: Competitive matches

== Transfers ==
=== In ===
| Date | Position | Player | From | Fee |
|---|---|---|---|---|
| June 2014 | DF | (Croatia) Davor Špehar | NK Hrvatski Dragovoljac | TBD |
| June 2014 | DF | (Croatia) Jurica Pranjić | NK Slaven Belupo | TBD |
| June 2014 | FW | (Croatia) Ivan Baraban | RNK Split | TBD |
| July 2014 | FW | (Bosnia and Herzegovina) Jasmin Mešanović | NK Čelik Zenica | TBD |
| September 2014 | GK | (Croatia) Filip Lončarić | FK Željezničar Sarajevo | Free |
| September 2014 | MF | (Bosnia and Herzegovina) Nermin Jamak | FK Željezničar Sarajevo | Free |
| 2 January 2015 | MF | (Croatia) Aljoša Vojnović | RNK Split | Free |
| 7 January 2015 | DF | (Croatia) Tomislav Čuljak | NK Vitez | Free |
| January 2015 | FW | (Bosnia and Herzegovina) Almir Aganspahić | FK Sarajevo | Free |
| January 2015 | DF | (Bosnia and Herzegovina) Neven Laštro | NK Široki Brijeg | Free |
| 4 February 2015 | MF | (Serbia) Dragomir Vukobratović | FC Levadia Tallinn | Free |
| 10 February 2015 | MF | (Bulgaria) Daniel Peev | FC Spartak Semey | Free |

=== Out ===
| Date | Position | Player | To | Fee |
|---|---|---|---|---|
| TBD | MF | (Croatia) Mihael Pongračić | NK Belišće | TBD |
| 31 December 2014 | MF | (Croatia) Josip Mišić | HNK Rijeka | 200,000 € |
| January 2015 | DF | (Croatia) Matej Jonjić | HNK Hajduk Split > Incheon United FC | TBD |

=== Loans in ===
| Date | Position | Player | From | Until |
|---|---|---|---|---|
| June 2014 | DF | (Croatia) Matej Jonjić | HNK Hajduk Split | End of season |
| 12 February 2015 | DF | (Bosnia and Herzegovina) Jozo Špikić | HNK Rijeka | End of season |
| 14 February 2015 | DF | (Uruguay) Federico Platero | FC Wil 1900 | 6 months |
| 16 February 2015 | FW | (Uruguay) Sasha Aneff | NK Domžale | 6 months |

=== Loans out ===
| Date | Position | Player | To | Until |
|---|---|---|---|---|
| TBD | MF | (Croatia) Matija Mišić | HNK Cibalia | TBD |
| TBD | FW | (Croatia) Alen Grgić | NK Sesvete | TBD |
| TBD | MF | (Croatia) Matej Grafina | NK Višnjevac | TBD |
| TBD | FW | (Croatia) Marko Dugandžić | Ternana Calcio | TBD |
| TBD | MF | (Croatia) Steven Ugarković | NK Gorica | TBD |
| TBD | MF | (Croatia) Benedik Mioč | NK Belišće | TBD |
| TBD | GK | (Croatia) Marko Malenica | HNK Segesta | TBD |
| TBD | MF | (Croatia) Antonio Pavić | NK Zavrč | Canceled |

Sources: nogometni-magazin.com
