= List of NK Osijek seasons =

This is a list of all seasons played by NK Osijek in national and European football, from 1947 to the most recent completed season.

This list details the club's achievements in all major competitions, and the top scorers for each season (note that only goals scored in league matches are taken into account).

== SFR Yugoslavia (1947–1991) ==
| Season | Division | P | W | D | L | F | A | Pts | Pos | Cup | Player | Goals |
| Season | League | | | | | | | | | Cup | Top goalscorer | |
|---|---|---|---|---|---|---|---|---|---|---|---|---|
| 1947–48 | Croatian League - Zone II | 12 | 8 | 3 | 1 | 42 | 13 | 19 | 1st | R16 | ? | ? |
| 1948–49 | Yugoslav Second League | 18 | 8 | 1 | 9 | 22 | 29 | 17 | 8th | R16 | ? | ? | ? |
| 1950 | Yugoslav Second League | 20 | 8 | 6 | 6 | 32 | 30 | 22 | 6th | R16 | ? | ? |
| 1951 | Yugoslav Second League | 30 | 15 | 4 | 11 | 60 | 53 | 34 | 7th | QF | ? | ? |
| 1952 | Croatian League - Osijek subassociation | 18 | 15 | 2 | 1 | 103 | 20 | 32 | 1st | —N/a | ? | ? |
| 1952–53 | Croatian-Slovenian League | 18 | 13 | 2 | 3 | 50 | 18 | 28 | 1st | R32 | ? | ? |
| 1953–54 | Yugoslav First League | 26 | 6 | 8 | 12 | 34 | 62 | 20 | 10th | R16 | Andrija Vekić | 12 |
| 1954–55 | Yugoslav First League | 26 | 6 | 7 | 13 | 29 | 51 | 19 | 12th | ? | T. Dvornić; Andrija Vekić | 8 |
| 1955–56 | Yugoslav First League | 26 | 5 | 1 | 20 | 30 | 94 | 11 | 14th | ? | Goran Popović; Andrija Vekić | 7 |
| 1956–57 | Yugoslav Second League - Zone III | 26 | 11 | 9 | 6 | 61 | 43 | 31 | 3rd | QF | ? | ? |
| 1957–58 | Yugoslav Second League - Zone III | 26 | 16 | 3 | 7 | 70 | 40 | 35 | 2nd | ? | ? | ? |
| 1958–59 | Yugoslav Second League - West | 20 | 7 | 4 | 9 | 42 | 48 | 18 | 9th | R32 | Nikola Rudić | ? |
| 1959–60 | Yugoslav Second League - West | 22 | 9 | 4 | 9 | 44 | 36 | 22 | 6th | R32 | Nikola Rudić | 14 |
| 1960–61 | Yugoslav Second League - West | 22 | 8 | 4 | 10 | 29 | 34 | 20 | 9th | R16 | ? | ? |
| 1961–62 | Yugoslav Second League - West | 22 | 5 | 9 | 8 | 34 | 39 | 19 | 7th | ? | ? | ? |
| 1962–63 | Yugoslav Second League - West | 30 | 13 | 8 | 9 | 47 | 37 | 34 | 4th | R16 | Josip Gucmirtl | 14 |
| 1963–64 | Yugoslav Second League - West | 30 | 13 | 7 | 10 | 53 | 40 | 33 | 5th | R16 | ? | ? |
| 1964–65 | Yugoslav Second League - West | 30 | 11 | 8 | 11 | 59 | 48 | 30 | 6th | ? | ? | ? |
| 1965–66 | Yugoslav Second League - West | 33 | 11 | 11 | 11 | 47 | 41 | 33 | 8th | SF | ? | ? |
| 1966–67 | Yugoslav Second League - West | 34 | 18 | 8 | 8 | 60 | 35 | 44 | 2nd | ? | Ilija Katić | 23 |
| 1967–68 | Yugoslav Second League - West | 34 | 15 | 9 | 10 | 46 | 27 | 39 | 3rd | ? | ? | ? |
| 1968–69 | Yugoslav Second League - North | 30 | 19 | 5 | 6 | 67 | 31 | 43 | 3rd | ? | ? | ? |
| 1969–70 | Yugoslav Second League - North | 30 | 17 | 8 | 5 | 60 | 21 | 42 | 1st | R16 | ? | ? |
| 1970–71 | Yugoslav Second League - North | 30 | 13 | 11 | 6 | 46 | 28 | 37 | 2nd | R16 | ? | ? |
| 1971–72 | Yugoslav Second League - North | 34 | 10 | 12 | 12 | 35 | 35 | 32 | 12th | ? | ? | ? |
| 1972–73 | Yugoslav Second League - North | 34 | 18 | 9 | 7 | 61 | 25 | 45 | 1st | —N/a | ? | ? |
| 1973–74 | Yugoslav Second League - West | 34 | 19 | 6 | 9 | 65 | 31 | 44 | 2nd | ? | Ivan Lukačević | 24 |
| 1974–75 | Yugoslav Second League - West | 34 | 12 | 9 | 13 | 37 | 38 | 33 | 13th | R32 | Ivan Lukačević | 18 |
| 1975–76 | Yugoslav Second League - West | 34 | 19 | 9 | 6 | 55 | 26 | 47 | 2nd | R32 | Ljupko Petrović | 21 |
| 1976–77 | Yugoslav Second League - West | 34 | 19 | 10 | 5 | 60 | 30 | 48 | 1st | ? | Ljupko Petrović | 16 |
| 1977–78 | Yugoslav First League | 34 | 9 | 12 | 13 | 32 | 42 | 30 | 13th | ? | Ivan Lukačević | 9 |
| 1978–79 | Yugoslav First League | 34 | 8 | 13 | 13 | 32 | 39 | 29 | 13th | R32 | Ivan Lukačević | 13 |
| 1979–80 | Yugoslav First League | 34 | 10 | 9 | 15 | 28 | 34 | 29 | 17th | R16 | Ivan Radić | 5 |
| 1980–81 | Yugoslav Second League - West | 30 | 17 | 8 | 5 | 50 | 16 | 42 | 1st | R32 | Ivan Lukačević | 13 |
| 1981–82 | Yugoslav First League | 34 | 9 | 11 | 14 | 36 | 37 | 29 | 16th | ? | Jasmin Džeko | 5 |
| 1982–83 | Yugoslav First League | 34 | 11 | 7 | 16 | 48 | 51 | 29 | 16th | R32 | Ante Rakela | 10 |
| 1983–84 | Yugoslav First League | 34 | 12 | 10 | 12 | 36 | 39 | 34 | 6th | R16 | Dragan Lepinjica | 8 |
| 1984–85 | Yugoslav First League | 34 | 12 | 7 | 15 | 37 | 46 | 31 | 12th | R16 | Goran Alar; Dražen Kukurić | 7 |
| 1985–86 | Yugoslav First League | 34 | 12 | 9 | 13 | 39 | 42 | 33 | 9th | QF | Branko Karačić; Izet Redžepagić | 6 |
| 1986–87 | Yugoslav First League | 34 | 15 | 4 | 15 | 40 | 44 | 34 | 11th | QF | Davor Šuker | 9 |
| 1987–88 | Yugoslav First League | 34 | 10 | 11 | 13 | 44 | 61 | 31 | 11th | R32 | Davor Šuker; Ante Rakela | 10 |
| 1988–89 | Yugoslav First League | 34 | 13 | 5 | 14 | 49 | 50 | 31 | 8th | R32 | Davor Šuker | 18 |
| 1989–90 | Yugoslav First League | 34 | 12 | 2 | 18 | 28 | 47 | 26 | 16th | SF | Goran Radojević | 6 |
| 1990–91 | Yugoslav First League | 36 | 14 | 4 | 16 | 52 | 57 | 32 | 9th | R16 | Goran Vlaović | 11 |

== Croatia (1992–present) ==
| Season | Division | P | W | D | L | F | A | Pts | Pos | Cup | Competition | Round | Player | Goals |
| Season | League | | | | | | | | | Cup | European competitions | | Top goalscorer | |
|---|---|---|---|---|---|---|---|---|---|---|---|---|---|---|
| 1992 | 1. HNL | 22 | 12 | 3 | 7 | 33 | 28 | 27 | 3rd | QF | | | Robert Špehar | 9 |
| 1992–93 | 1. HNL | 30 | 11 | 7 | 12 | 40 | 42 | 29 | 6th | QF | | | Alen Petrović | 10 |
| 1993–94 | 1. HNL | 34 | 12 | 11 | 11 | 56 | 58 | 35 | 8th | R2 | | | Antun Labak | 16 |
| 1994–95 | 1. HNL | 30 | 16 | 11 | 3 | 65 | 30 | 59 | 3rd | SF | | | Robert Špehar | 23 |
| 1995–96 | 1. HNL | 32 | 16 | 4 | 12 | 51 | 32 | 52 | 4th | QF | UEFA Cup | QR | Igor Pamić | 17 |
| 1996–97 | 1. HNL | 30 | 12 | 5 | 13 | 40 | 38 | 41 | 8th | SF | | | Dumitru Mitu | 10 |
| 1997–98 | 1. HNL | 32 | 14 | 6 | 12 | 42 | 38 | 48 | 3rd | R1 | | | Petar Krpan | 10 |
| 1998–99 | 1. HNL | 32 | 14 | 6 | 12 | 51 | 39 | 48 | 4th | W | UEFA Cup | QR2 | Stanko Bubalo | 10 |
| 1999–2000 | 1. HNL | 33 | 15 | 8 | 10 | 55 | 49 | 53 | 3rd | QF | UEFA Cup | R1 | Stanko Bubalo | 13 |
| 2000–01 | 1. HNL | 32 | 17 | 6 | 9 | 61 | 47 | 57 | 3rd | SF | UEFA Cup | R3 | Nenad Bjelica; Marijan Vuka | 9 |
| 2001–02 | 1. HNL | 30 | 11 | 4 | 15 | 45 | 48 | 37 | 8th | SF | UEFA Cup | R2 | Milan Pavličić | 9 |
| 2002–03 | 1. HNL | 32 | 10 | 9 | 13 | 32 | 51 | 39 | 8th | QF | | | Milan Pavličić | 11 |
| 2003–04 | 1. HNL | 32 | 11 | 6 | 15 | 50 | 57 | 39 | 4th | QF | | | Robert Špehar | 18 |
| 2004–05 | 1. HNL | 32 | 9 | 14 | 9 | 41 | 45 | 41 | 8th | SF | | | Karlo Primorac | 11 |
| 2005–06 | 1. HNL | 32 | 13 | 5 | 14 | 31 | 48 | 44 | 4th | QF | | | Josip Balatinac | 6 |
| 2006–07 | 1. HNL | 33 | 11 | 10 | 12 | 42 | 45 | 43 | 6th | R2 | Intertoto Cup | R2 | Stjepan Jukić | 9 |
| 2007–08 | 1. HNL | 33 | 16 | 6 | 11 | 43 | 34 | 54 | 3rd | R2 | | | Vedran Nikšić | 8 |
| 2008–09 | 1. HNL | 33 | 10 | 11 | 12 | 40 | 41 | 41 | 7th | R1 | | | Josip Barišić | 8 |
| 2009–10 | 1. HNL | 30 | 13 | 8 | 9 | 49 | 36 | 47 | 5th | QF | | | Josip Barišić; Ivan Miličević; Vedran Nikšić | 8 |
| 2010–11 | 1. HNL | 30 | 9 | 12 | 9 | 31 | 29 | 39 | 8th | QF | | | Ivan Miličević | 5 |
| 2011–12 | 1. HNL | 30 | 11 | 10 | 9 | 45 | 38 | 43 | 8th | RU | | | Antonio Perošević | 7 |
| 2012–13 | 1. HNL | 33 | 9 | 12 | 12 | 25 | 33 | 39 | 7th | QF | Europa League | QR2 | Antonio Perošević; Zoran Kvržić | 4 |
| 2013–14 | 1. HNL | 36 | 8 | 9 | 19 | 38 | 64 | 33 | 8th | QF | | | Josip Barišić | 6 |
| 2014–15 | 1. HNL | 36 | 10 | 6 | 20 | 42 | 59 | 36 | 8th | R2 | | | Antonio Perošević; Aljoša Vojnović | 6 |
| 2015–16 | 1. HNL | 36 | 7 | 13 | 16 | 27 | 49 | 34 | 8th | QF | | | Antonio Perošević | 6 |
| 2016–17 | 1. HNL | 36 | 20 | 6 | 10 | 52 | 37 | 66 | 4th | SF | | | Muzafer Ejupi | 14 |
| 2017–18 | 1. HNL | 36 | 14 | 14 | 8 | 53 | 38 | 56 | 4th | QF | Europa League | PO | Haris Hajradinović | 9 |
| 2018–19 | 1. HNL | 36 | 18 | 8 | 10 | 61 | 36 | 62 | 3rd | SF | Europa League | QR2 | Mirko Marić | 18 |
| 2019–20 | 1. HNL | 36 | 17 | 11 | 8 | 47 | 29 | 62 | 4th | SF | Europa League | QR2 | Mirko Marić | 20 |
| 2020–21 | 1. HNL | 36 | 23 | 8 | 5 | 59 | 25 | 77 | 2nd | QF | Europa League | QR2 | Ramón Miérez | 22 |
| 2021–22 | 1. HNL | 36 | 19 | 12 | 5 | 49 | 29 | 69 | 3rd | SF | Conference League | QR3 | Mijo Caktaš, Mihael Žaper | 5 |
| 2022–23 | HNL | 36 | 13 | 11 | 12 | 46 | 41 | 50 | 3rd | QF | Conference League | QR2 | Ramón Miérez | 12 |
| 2023–24 | HNL | 36 | 16 | 9 | 11 | 62 | 43 | 57 | 4th | QF | Conference League | QR3 | Ramón Miérez | 18 |
| 2024–25 | HNL | 36 | 11 | 9 | 16 | 46 | 52 | 42 | 7th | SF | Conference League | QR3 | Arnel Jakupović | 9 |
| 2025–26 | HNL | 36 | 8 | 11 | 17 | 27 | 49 | 35 | 9th | R2 | | | Nail Omerović | 8 |
