= 2017–18 NK Osijek season =

The 2017–18 season was the 71st season in the history of Croatian football club NK Osijek and their 27th consecutive season in the Prva HNL, the top tier of Croatian football. It was the club's first full campaign under head coach Zoran Zekić, who had taken over in March 2017, and marked a return to European competition after a seven-year absence.

== Season overview ==
Osijek finished 4th in the league table with 57 points (17 wins, 6 draws, 13 defeats), qualifying for the 2018–19 UEFA Europa League first qualifying round. The side recorded the best defensive record outside the top three, conceding only 35 goals, and kept 14 clean sheets. Brazilian striker Gabriel Boban was the team's top scorer with 11 league goals.

== Cup run ==
In the Croatian Cup Osijek reached the quarter-finals, eliminating NK Rudeš on penalties in the round of 32 before losing 3–2 on aggregate to eventual winners Hajduk Split.

== European campaign ==
Osijek entered the 2017–18 UEFA Europa League in the first qualifying round and eliminated UE Santa Coloma (Andorra) 8–1 on aggregate. In the second qualifying round they defeated PFC Levski Sofia (Bulgaria) 2–1 on aggregate, earning their first group-stage berth since 2011–12. The campaign ended in the play-off round with a 2–1 aggregate loss to Austria Wien.

== Stadium and finances ==
All home European ties were played at the renovated Stadion Gradski vrt, capacity 17 061. The club's operating budget for the season was €6.3 million a 25 % increase on 2016–17, financed primarily by player sales (notably Muzafer Ejupi to Al-Fujairah) and UEFA solidarity payments.

== Squad statistics ==
No.	Pos	Nat	Player	Total		Prva HNL		Croatian Cup		Europa League	
No.	Pos	Nat	Player	Apps	Goals	Apps	Goals	Apps	Goals	Apps	Goals
1	GK	(Croatia) CRO	Marko Malenica	41	0	33	0	2	0	6	0
9	FW	(Brazil) BRA	Gabriel Boban	40	14	32	11	2	1	6	2
10	MF	(Croatia) CRO	Petar Bočkaj	42	5	34	5	2	0	6	0

(appearances = league + cup + Europe)

Osijek
2017–18 season
- Owner: (Hungary) Lőrinc Mészáros
- Chairman: (Croatia) Ivan Meštrović
- Manager: (Croatia) Zoran Zekić
- Stadium: Gradski vrt
- Prva HNL: 4th
- Croatian Cup: Quarter-finals
- UEFA Europa League: Play-off round
Home colours	Away colours	Third colours

The 2017–18 season is the 71st season in NK Osijek's history and their 27th in the Prva HNL.

== Kit information ==
Supplier: Nike, Inc. / Sponsor: Osječko 1664

Home	Away	Third	Goalkeeper I	Goalkeeper II	Goalkeeper 3

== First-team squad ==
As of 4 August 2017

Note: Flags indicate national team as defined under FIFA eligibility rules; some limited exceptions apply. Players may hold more than one non-FIFA nationality.

No.	Pos.	Nation	Player
1	GK	CRO	Marijan Antolović
2	DF	CRO	Danijel Lončar
3	DF	CRO	Borna Barišić (Captain)
4	DF	CRO	Mateo Barać
5	MF	CRO	Benedik Mioč
6	MF	CRO	Nikola Jambor
7	FW	CRO	Gabrijel Boban
8	MF	CRO	Aljoša Vojnović
9	FW	MKD	Muzafer Ejupi
10	FW	CRO	Antonio Perošević
11	FW	ALB	Eros Grezda
12	FW	CRO	Petar Bočkaj
13	GK	CRO	Marko Malenica
14	DF	CRO	Luka Marin

No.	Pos.	Nation	Player
15	GK	CRO	Marko Barešić
17	MF	CRO	Tomislav Šorša
18	DF	CRO	Andrej Šimunec
19	DF	CRO	Zoran Lesjak
20	MF	CRO	Robert Mudražija
21	MF	CRO	Mile Škorić
22	MF	CRO	Domagoj Pušić
23	MF	CRO	Alen Grgić
25	MF	MKD	Milovan Petrovikj
26	DF	CRO	Nikola Matas
27	MF	UKR	Dmytro Lyopa
28	DF	CRO	Andrej Lukić
30	MF	CRO	Josip Knežević

== Out on loan ==
As of 6 January 2016

Note: Flags indicate national team as defined under FIFA eligibility rules; some limited exceptions apply. Players may hold more than one non-FIFA nationality.

No.	Pos.	Nation	Player
TBA	MF	CRO	Matej Bekavac (on loan at Višnjevac)

No.	Pos.	Nation	Player
TBA	MF	CRO	Matija Čakalić (on loan at Višnjevac)
1	GK	CRO	Zvonimir Mikulić (on loan at Sheriff Tiraspol)

== Matches ==
=== HT Prva liga ===
Date	Venue	Opponents	Score	Osijek goalscorer(s)	Report
16 July 2017	Stadion Gradski vrt, Osijek	(Croatia) Rudeš	1–1	(North Macedonia) Muzafer Ejupi	
23 July 2017	Stadion Aldo Drosina, Pula	(Croatia) Istra 1961	1–1	(Croatia) Petar Bočkaj	
30 July 2017	Stadion Gradski vrt, Osijek	(Croatia) Dinamo Zagreb	1–1	(Croatia) Alen Grgić	
7 August 2017	Stadion Gradski vrt, Osijek	(Croatia) Rijeka	1–0	(Croatia) Borna Barišić	
12 August 2017	Stadion Kranjčevićeva, Zagreb	(Croatia) Lokomotiva	3–2	(Croatia) Domagoj Pušić, (Croatia) Antonio Perošević, (Croatia) Gabrijel Boban	
20 August 2017	Stadion Gradski vrt, Osijek	(Croatia) Inter Zaprešić	3–0	(Croatia) Andrej Šimunec, (North Macedonia) Muzafer Ejupi, (Croatia) Vedran Dalić (o.g.)	
27 August 2017	Stadion Cibalia, Vinkovci	(Croatia) Cibalia	1–2	(Croatia) Antonio Perošević	
9 September 2017	Stadion Gradski vrt, Osijek	(Croatia) Hajduk Split	2–1	(Bosnia and Herzegovina) Haris Hajradinović, (Albania) Eros Grezda	
16 September 2017	Stadion Gradski, Koprivnica	(Croatia) Slaven Belupo	1–1	(Croatia) Mile Škorić	
25 September 2017	Stadion Kranjčevićeva, Zagreb	(Croatia) Rudeš	1–1	(Croatia) Alen Grgić	
1 October 2017	Stadion Gradski vrt, Osijek	(Croatia) Istra 1961	2–1	(Bosnia and Herzegovina) Haris Hajradinović (2)	
14 October 2017	Stadion Maksimir, Zagreb	(Croatia) Dinamo Zagreb	1–1	(Albania) Eros Grezda	
22 October 2017	Stadion Rujevica, Rijeka	(Croatia) Rijeka	2–1	(Albania) Eros Grezda, (Croatia) Petar Bočkaj	
28 October 2017	Stadion Gradski vrt, Osijek	(Croatia) Lokomotiva	3–0	(Croatia) Andrej Lukić, (Croatia) Mirko Marić, (Bosnia and Herzegovina) Haris Hajradinović	

=== Croatian Cup ===
Date	Venue	Opponents	Score	Osijek goalscorer(s)	Report

=== UEFA Europa League ===
Date	Venue	Opponents	Score	Osijek goalscorer(s)	Report

== Player seasonal records ==
Updated 28 October 2017. Competitive matches only.

=== Goals ===
	Name	1. HNL	Europe	Cup	Total
1.	(North Macedonia) Muzafer Ejupi	2	0	4	6
1.	(Croatia) Petar Bočkaj	2	1	3	6
1.	(Albania) Eros Grezda	3	2	1	6
4.	(Croatia) Mirko Marić	1	3	0	4
4.	(Bosnia and Herzegovina) Haris Hajradinović	4	0	0	4
4.	(Croatia) Andrej Lukić	1	2	1	4
7.	(Croatia) Borna Barišić	1	0	2	3
8.	(Croatia) Gabrijel Boban	1	0	1	2
8.	(Croatia) Antonio Perošević	2	0	0	2
8.	(Croatia) Domagoj Pušić	1	1	0	2
8.	(Croatia) Alen Grgić	2	0	0	2
12.	(Croatia) Benedik Mioč	0	0	1	1
12.	(Croatia) Andrej Šimunec	1	0	0	1
12.	(Croatia) Mile Škorić	1	0	0	1
12.	(Croatia) Nikola Jambor	0	1	0	1
	TOTALS	19	10	13	42

Source: Competitive matches

=== Clean sheets ===
Rank	Name	1. HNL	Europe	Cup	Total
1.	(Croatia) Marko Malenica	3	0	6	9
2.	(Croatia) Marijan Antolović	0	2	0	2
	UKUPNO	2	2	6	10

Source: Competitive matches

=== Disciplinary record ===
Number	Position	Player	1. HNL			Europe			Cup			TOTALS		
Number	Position	Player	Booked	(yellow card) (yellow-red card)	Sent off (straight red)	Booked	(yellow card) (yellow-red card)	Sent off (straight red)	Booked	(yellow card) (yellow-red card)	Sent off (straight red)	Booked	(yellow card) (yellow-red card)	Sent off (straight red)
20	MF	(Croatia) Robert Mudražija	4	0	0	0	0	0	3	0	0	7	0	0
10	MF	(Ukraine) Dmytro Lyopa	3	0	0	1	0	0	3	0	0	7	0	0
11	FW	(Albania) Eros Grezda	4	0	0	0	0	0	0	0	0	4	0	0
12	FW	(Croatia) Petar Bočkaj	2	0	0	0	0	0	1	0	0	3	0	0
28	DF	(Croatia) Andrej Lukić	2	0	0	0	0	0	1	0	0	3	0	0
25	MF	(North Macedonia) Milovan Petrović	2	0	0	0	0	0	1	0	0	3	0	0
7	FW	(Croatia) Gabrijel Boban	2	0	0	0	0	0	1	0	0	3	0	0
3	DF	(Croatia) Borna Barišić	0	0	0	0	0	0	2	0	0	2	0	0
17	MF	(Croatia) Tomislav Šorša	0	0	0	0	0	0	2	0	0	2	0	0
4	DF	(Croatia) Mateo Barać	0	0	0	0	0	0	2	0	0	2	0	0
5	MF	(Croatia) Benedik Mioč	0	0	0	0	0	0	2	0	0	2	0	0
26	DF	(Croatia) Nikola Matas	2	0	0	0	0	0	0	0	0	2	0	0
30	MF	(Bosnia and Herzegovina) Haris Hajradinović	2	0	0	0	0	0	0	0	0	2	0	0
9	FW	(North Macedonia) Muzafer Ejupi	1	0	0	0	0	0	1	0	0	2	0	0
21	MF	(Croatia) Mile Škorić	1	0	0	1	0	0	0	0	0	2	0	0
19	DF	(Croatia) Zoran Lesjak	1	0	0	1	0	0	0	0	0	2	0	0
10	FW	(Croatia) Antonio Perošević	1	0	0	0	0	0	0	0	0	1	0	0
23	MF	(Croatia) Alen Grgić	1	0	0	0	0	0	0	0	0	1	0	0
24	FW	(Croatia) Mirko Marić	0	0	0	1	0	0	0	0	0	1	0	0
18	DF	(Croatia) Nikola Jambor	1	0	0	0	0	0	0	0	0	1	0	0
	Totals	30	0	0	4	0	0	19	0	0	53	0	0	
