= List of Croatian football transfers summer 2015 =

this is a list of Croatian football transfers for summer 2015, only the Croatian First Football League is included

== Croatian First Football League ==
=== Dinamo Zagreb ===
In: Note: Flags indicate national team as defined under FIFA eligibility rules; some limited exceptions apply. Players may hold more than one non-FIFA nationality.

No.	Pos.	Nation	Player
9	FW	CHI	Ángelo Henríquez (from (England) Manchester United)
23	DF	CRO	Gordon Schildenfeld (from (Russia) Dynamo Moscow)
25	DF	CRO	Borna Barišić (from Osijek)
30	MF	CRO	Marko Rog (from Split)

Out: Note: Flags indicate national team as defined under FIFA eligibility rules; some limited exceptions apply. Players may hold more than one non-FIFA nationality.

No.	Pos.	Nation	Player
25	DF	CRO	Borna Barišić (on loan to Lokomotiva)
-	DF	GHA	Lee Addy (to (Serbia) Čukarički)
-	DF	CRO	Jozo Šimunović (to (Scotland) Celtic)
-	MF	CRO	Mario Šitum (on loan to (Italy) Spezia)
-	FW	CRO	Dino Špehar (to Split)

=== Hajduk Split ===
In: Note: Flags indicate national team as defined under FIFA eligibility rules; some limited exceptions apply. Players may hold more than one non-FIFA nationality.

No.	Pos.	Nation	Player
2	DF	ARG	Julián Velázquez (from (Italy) Palermo)
3	DF	CRO	Hrvoje Milić (from (Russia) Rostov)
6	MF	BRA	Jefferson (from (Portugal) Feirense)
11	FW	CMR	Franck Ohandza (from Sesvete)
44	MF	CRO	Ante Roguljić (on loan from (Austria) Red Bull Salzburg)

Out: Note: Flags indicate national team as defined under FIFA eligibility rules; some limited exceptions apply. Players may hold more than one non-FIFA nationality.

No.	Pos.	Nation	Player
2	DF	CRO	Dino Mikanović (to (Denmark) AGF)
6	DF	BIH	Avdija Vršajević (released)
10	FW	UKR	Artem Milevskyi (released)
78	MF	CRO	Dejan Mezga (to (Cyprus) Apollon Limassol)

=== Inter Zaprešić ===
In: Note: Flags indicate national team as defined under FIFA eligibility rules; some limited exceptions apply. Players may hold more than one non-FIFA nationality.

No.	Pos.	Nation	Player
8	MF	CRO	Frano Mlinar (on loan from (Spain) Granada)
12	GK	CRO	Josip Posavec (on loan from (Italy) Palermo)

Out: Note: Flags indicate national team as defined under FIFA eligibility rules; some limited exceptions apply. Players may hold more than one non-FIFA nationality.

No.	Pos.	Nation	Player
12	GK	CRO	Josip Posavec (to (Italy) Palermo)

=== NK Istra 1961 ===
In: Note: Flags indicate national team as defined under FIFA eligibility rules; some limited exceptions apply. Players may hold more than one non-FIFA nationality.

No.	Pos.	Nation	Player
18	MF	SRB	Milan Đurić (from (Serbia) Jagodina)
19	MF	BIH	Nermin Zolotić (on loan from (Belgium) Gent)
27	MF	BIH	Damir Zlomislić (on loan from Rijeka)
34	GK	SRB	Miloš Ostojić (from (Serbia) OFK Beograd)

Out: Note: Flags indicate national team as defined under FIFA eligibility rules; some limited exceptions apply. Players may hold more than one non-FIFA nationality.

No.	Pos.	Nation	Player

=== NK Lokomotiva ===
In: Note: Flags indicate national team as defined under FIFA eligibility rules; some limited exceptions apply. Players may hold more than one non-FIFA nationality.

No.	Pos.	Nation	Player
-	DF	CRO	Borna Barišić (on loan from Dinamo Zagreb)

Out: Note: Flags indicate national team as defined under FIFA eligibility rules; some limited exceptions apply. Players may hold more than one non-FIFA nationality.

No.	Pos.	Nation	Player

=== NK Zagreb ===
In: Note: Flags indicate national team as defined under FIFA eligibility rules; some limited exceptions apply. Players may hold more than one non-FIFA nationality.

No.	Pos.	Nation	Player

Out: Note: Flags indicate national team as defined under FIFA eligibility rules; some limited exceptions apply. Players may hold more than one non-FIFA nationality.

No.	Pos.	Nation	Player
10	MF	CRO	Filip Krovinović (to (Portugal) Rio Ave)

=== NK Osijek ===
In: Note: Flags indicate national team as defined under FIFA eligibility rules; some limited exceptions apply. Players may hold more than one non-FIFA nationality.

No.	Pos.	Nation	Player
16	DF	CRO	Tomislav Radotić (from Split)
17	DF	SRB	Mario Maslać (from (Serbia) Borac Čačak)
24	MF	CRO	Tomislav Šarić (on loan from (Italy) Parma)

Out: Note: Flags indicate national team as defined under FIFA eligibility rules; some limited exceptions apply. Players may hold more than one non-FIFA nationality.

No.	Pos.	Nation	Player
-	DF	CRO	Borna Barišić (to Dinamo Zagreb)

=== HNK Rijeka ===
In: Note: Flags indicate national team as defined under FIFA eligibility rules; some limited exceptions apply. Players may hold more than one non-FIFA nationality.

No.	Pos.	Nation	Player
4	DF	CRO	Frane Ikić (from Zadar)
6	DF	MKD	Stefan Ristovski (on loan from (Italy) Spezia)
8	DF	MKD	Leonard Zuta (from (Sweden) Häcken)
11	FW	SVN	Roman Bezjak (from (Bulgaria) Ludogorets Razgrad)
23	MF	ALB	Odise Roshi (from (Germany) Frankfurt)
29	DF	MNE	Marko Vešović (on loan from (Italy) Spezia)

Out Note: Flags indicate national team as defined under FIFA eligibility rules; some limited exceptions apply. Players may hold more than one non-FIFA nationality.

No.	Pos.	Nation	Player
1	GK	CRO	Simon Sluga (on loan to (Italy) Spezia)
5	DF	CRO	Dario Knežević (released)
7	MF	CRO	Dario Čanađija (on loan to (Italy) Spezia)
8	MF	BIH	Zoran Kvržić (on loan to (Italy) Spezia)
11	DF	CRO	Ivan Tomečak (to (Ukraine) Dnipro)
14	MF	SVN	Goran Cvijanović (to (Italy) Ascoli)
20	FW	BUL	Ventsislav Hristov (on loan to (Albania) Skënderbeu Korçë)
21	MF	BIH	Damir Zlomislić (on loan to Istra 1961)
22	DF	CRO	Marin Leovac (to (Greece) PAOK)
27	MF	CRO	Josip Mišić (on loan to (Italy) Spezia)
30	MF	CRO	Josip Brezovec (on loan to (Italy) Spezia)
-	DF	CRO	Mato Miloš (on loan to (Italy) Spezia)

=== RNK Split ===
In: Note: Flags indicate national team as defined under FIFA eligibility rules; some limited exceptions apply. Players may hold more than one non-FIFA nationality.

No.	Pos.	Nation	Player
2	DF	ALB	Amir Rrahmani (from (Albania) Partizani)
7	FW	MKD	Marko Simonovski (from (Russia) Amkar Perm)
17	FW	SRB	Miloš Đorđević (from (Serbia) Bežanija)
18	FW	CRO	Dino Špehar (from Dinamo Zagreb)

Out: Note: Flags indicate national team as defined under FIFA eligibility rules; some limited exceptions apply. Players may hold more than one non-FIFA nationality.

No.	Pos.	Nation	Player
7	MF	CRO	Aljoša Vojnović (to (Romania) Dinamo București)
99	MF	ALB	Sokol Cikalleshi (to (Turkey) İstanbul Başakşehir)
-	DF	CRO	Tomislav Radotić (to Osijek)
-	MF	CRO	Marko Rog (to Dinamo Zagreb)

=== NK Slaven Belupo ===
In: Note: Flags indicate national team as defined under FIFA eligibility rules; some limited exceptions apply. Players may hold more than one non-FIFA nationality.

No.	Pos.	Nation	Player
7	MF	AUT	Stefan Savić (from (Austria) Linz)

Out: Note: Flags indicate national team as defined under FIFA eligibility rules; some limited exceptions apply. Players may hold more than one non-FIFA nationality.

No.	Pos.	Nation	Player
-	FW	SRB	Marko Mirić (to (Belgium) Lokeren)
