= Eros Grezda =

Albanian footballer (born 1995)

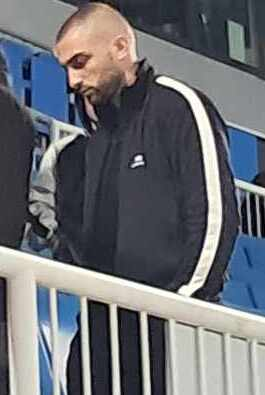
- Eros Grezda, 2024

Personal information
- Full name: Eros Genc Grezda
- Date of birth: 15 April 1995 (age 31)
- Place of birth: Gjakova, FR Yugoslavia
- Height: 1.80 m (5 ft 11 in)
- Positions: Winger; attacking midfielder

Youth career
- 2004–2010: Prishtina
- 2010: Rabotnički
- 2010–2012: Dinamo Zagreb
- 2012–2013: Grazer AK
- 2013–2014: Aluminij

Senior career*
Years	Team	Apps	(Gls)
2013–2015	Aluminij	29	(6)
2015	Zavrč	11	(0)
2015–2017	Lokomotiva	59	(14)
2017–2018	Osijek	26	(5)
2018–2020	Rangers	17	(2)
2020–2022	Osijek	11	(1)
2021	→ Zalaegerszeg (loan)	5	(1)
2022	Šibenik	12	(2)
2022–2023	Manisa	8	(0)
2023	Zalaegerszeg	7	(1)
2023–2024	Partizani Tirana	9	(0)
2024	Rudeš	9	(0)

International career^{‡}
2014–2016	Albania U21	2	(0)
2017–2019	Albania	13	(1)
- * Club domestic league appearances and goals as of 24 April 2024 ‡ National team caps and goals as of 25 March 2019

Eros Genc Grezda (born 15 April 1995) is a professional footballer who last played as a winger for Croatian club Rudeš. Born in Yugoslavia, he represented Albania internationally.

== Early life ==
Grezda was born in Gjakova, FR Yugoslavia (modern day Kosovo) and grew up in the capital Pristina. He is the third child of Genc and Valbona Grezda.

== Club career ==
=== Early career ===
Eros Grezda started his career at Prishtina, playing there between the ages of 9 and 15. He subsequently moved for a short while to Rabotnički where he was scouted by Dinamo Zagreb, where he soon moved and spent 1 year playing with the under-17 side.

=== Austria and Slovenia ===
Grezda's first taste of senior football was in Austria, where he moved in the summer of 2012, signing for Grazer AK's lower league reserve side. He played in merely two games before moving on. Grezda arrived in Slovenia in the summer of 2013, signing for second-tier NK Aluminij. He stayed in Kidričevo for a year and a half, accumulating 29 caps and 6 goals for the first team. He then moved up a tier, signing for the Slovenian PrvaLiga side NK Zavrč on 23 January 2015 alongside Antonio Pavić.

=== Lokomotiva ===
On 9 July 2015 Grezda signed for Lokomotiva in the Croatian First League for a fee of €100,000. He scored twice against Slaven Belupo on 23 December 2015 in a 3–0 win and was named best player of the week. He scored another brace against Osijek on 27 February 2016 in a match which finished in a 1–3 victory. He scored the first and last goals in the 9th and 90th minutes. On 20 April he was selected in the team of the week. On 8 May 2016 Grezda scored his 9th goal of the season in the derby against Zagreb where Lokomotiva won 2–0.

Grezda assisted the fellow Albanian U21 international Endri Çekiçi's goal against Osijek on 25 February 2017 in the 32nd minute, providing a cross from right side as Lokomotiva won 2–0. Grezda scored 1 goal and won a penalty kick himself on 7 April 2017 against Cibalia where Lokomotiva won 4–1. A week later Grezda scored again, in the Zagreb derby against Dinamo Zagreb in a 1–2 loss where Grezda scored the opening goal in the 5th minute.

=== Osijek ===
On 25 May 2017 Grezda signed a transfer to Osijek which gained him the right to play in the 2017–18 UEFA Europa League qualifying round. On 13 July 2017 Grezda scored his first UEFA club competition goal in the 2017–18 UEFA Europa League Second qualifying round first leg match against Swiss side Luzern which Osijek won 2–0. In the second leg against Luzern 1 week later, Grezda assisted the only Osijek goal scored by Muzafer Ejupi; the match finished in a 2–1 loss, however Osijek advanced into the next round by winning 3–2 on aggregate. Grezda scored his first league goal on 9 September 2017 against Hajduk Split in the 93rd minute to give Osijek the 2–1 win. Following his impressive performance and the importance of his goal in the later win, Grezda was chosen as the best player of the week.

=== Rangers ===
On 31 August 2018, Rangers of the Scottish Premiership confirmed the signing of Grezda on a four-year contract, subject to receiving visa and international clearance.

On 20 September 2019, Rangers manager Steven Gerrard said Grezda would not play for the club again after an incident during a Tunnock's Cup match between Rangers' under-21s and Northern Irish team Ballymena United: Grezda clashed with opposition defender Andrew Burns and allegedly spat on the player during the game. Several Rangers players visited opposition manager David Jeffrey to apologise afterwards, and in a statement to the media, Gerrard said the player would no longer represent the club if the allegations were confirmed. Grezda, who had not played for the Rangers first team since April 2019 after falling out of favour, was also fined for his conduct after the matter was investigated.

=== Return to Osijek ===
On 6 January 2020, it was announced that Grezda had returned to his former side Osijek for an undisclosed fee after disciplinary issues on the pitch at rangers.

=== Return to Zalaegerszeg ===
On 20 February 2023, Grezda signed a one-and-a-half-year contract with Zalaegerszeg in Hungary after playing for the club on loan a year prior.

== International career ==
=== Under-21 ===
Grezda is a Kosovar Albanian and initially only had Kosovo citizenship but declared that he was waiting on an invitation by the Albanian Football Association. He first received a call up from Albania under-21s coach Skënder Gega in August 2014 for a friendly against Qatar, but due to visa problems the game which was planned to be played in the United Kingdom did not go ahead. He was again called up in September for a friendly against Romania on 8 October 2014. He made his debut for Albania U21 in the Friendly match against Romania U21 on 8 October 2014, playing as a starter in a 3–1 loss.

Following his good form with Lokomotiva, Grezda again grabbed the attention of the Albanian Football Association and he received a call up by coach Redi Jupi for the 2017 UEFA European Under-21 Championship qualification matches against Greece U21 and Hungary U21 on 24 & 28 March 2016 respectively. However, due to the absence of Albanian citizenship Grezda could not feature in either game.

He received Albanian citizenship on 31 March 2016 alongside fellow Albania under-21 member Jasir Asani.

He was called up for the 2017 UEFA European Under-21 Championship qualification match against Greece U21 on 2 September 2016. He debuted against Greece U21 playing as a starter and substituting off at half-time for Kostandin Kariqi due to injury.

=== Senior ===
Grezda got his first call up to the Albania senior team by coach Gianni De Biasi for the 2018 FIFA World Cup qualification matches against Liechtenstein and Spain in October 2016. He was an unused substitute in both occasions. He was called up then for the 5th 2018 FIFA World Cup qualification fixture against Italy on 24 March 2017 and the Friendly match against Bosnia and Herzegovina on 28 March 2017. Grezda made his first senior debut on 24 March 2017 against Italy coming on as a substitute in the 87th minute in place of Odise Roshi.

== Career statistics ==
=== Club ===
As of 1 January 2020

Appearances and goals by club, season and competition
Club	Season	League			Cup		Europe		Total	
Club	Season	Division	Apps	Goals	Apps	Goals	Apps	Goals	Apps	Goals
Aluminij	2013–14	Slovenian Second League	18	5	2	0	—		20	5
Aluminij	2014–15	Slovenian Second League	11	1	1	0	—		12	1
Aluminij	Total		29	6	3	0	—		32	6
Zavrč	2014–15	Slovenian PrvaLiga	11	0	0	0	—		11	0
Lokomotiva Zagreb	2015–16	Croatian First League	29	9	2	0	—		31	9
Lokomotiva Zagreb	2016–17	Croatian First League	30	5	3	1	8 (Note: Appearance(s) in UEFA Europa League)	0	41	6
Lokomotiva Zagreb	Total		59	14	5	1	8	0	72	15
Osijek	2017–18	Croatian First League	26	5	3	2	8	1	37	8
Rangers	2018–19	Scottish Premiership	13	2	1	0	3	0	17	2
Career total			138	27	12	3	19	1	169	31

=== International ===
As of 10 April 2019

Appearances and goals by national team and year
National team	Year	Apps	Goals
Albania	2017	6	1
Albania	2018	5	0
Albania	2019	2	0
Total		13	1

As of 10 April 2019
Scores and results list Albania's goal tally first, score column indicates score after each Grezda goal.

List of international goals scored by Eros Grezda
No.	Date	Venue	Cap	Opponent	Score	Result	Competition
1	13 November 2017	New Antalya Stadium, Antalya, Turkey	6	Turkey	3–1	3–2	Friendly
