= Tomislav Šorša =

Croatian footballer

Personal information
- Date of birth: 11 May 1989 (age 37)
- Place of birth: Osijek, SR Croatia, SFR Yugoslavia
- Height: 1.74 m (5 ft 8 1/2 in)
- Position: Midfielder

Team information
- Current team: FC Brașov
- Number: 17

Youth career
- Osijek

Senior career*
Years	Team	Apps	(Gls)
2006–2016	Osijek	191	(11)
2008–2009	→ Karlovac (loan)	25	(2)
2016–2017	CFR Cluj	20	(2)
2017–2020	Osijek	34	(1)
2020–2022	Gjilani	38	(0)
2022–2023	FC Brașov	12	(1)
2023–	Bijelo Brdo	0	(0)

International career^{‡}
2004–2005	Croatia U17	15	(7)
2006–2008	Croatia U19	22	(1)
- * Club domestic league appearances and goals as of 1 June 2023 ‡ National team caps and goals as of 27 May 2008

Tomislav Šorša (born 11 May 1989) is a Croatian football midfielder, currently playing for FC Brașov in the Romanian Liga II.

== Club career ==
Šorša started his career playing at youth level for his hometown club Osijek, with whom he signed a professional four-year contract in July 2006. He made his debut for the first team in the 2006–07 season and made a total of thirteen appearances before being loaned to Druga HNL side Karlovac for the 2008–09 season. He helped them win the promotion to Prva HNL with two goals in 25 appearances. In September 2009, Šorša extended his contract for four more years. The following season Šorša scored his first goal in Prva HNL in a 3–1 victory over Istra 1961. He began his career as a striker, but manager Tomislav Steinbrückner moved him into a midfield role during the course of the season. In season 2016/17 he was loaned to Romanian club CFR Cluj, but returned to Osijek on 9 July 2017.

== Career statistics ==
Club	Season	League		Cup		Europe		Total	
Club	Season	Apps	Goals	Apps	Goals	Apps	Goals	Apps	Goals
Osijek	2006–07	7	0	1	0	–		8	0
Osijek	2007–08	5	0	–		–		5	0
Osijek	2008–09	1	0	–		–		1	0
Karlovac (loan)	2008–09	25	2	3	0	–		28	2
Osijek	2009–10	28	1	4	1	–		32	2
Osijek	2010–11	24	1	2	0	–		26	1
Osijek	2011–12	29	4	8	1	–		37	5
Osijek	2012–13	1	0	–		–		1	0
Osijek	2013–14	33	3	3	0	–		36	3
Osijek	2014–15	31	0	2	1	–		33	1
Osijek	2015–16	32	2	1	0	–		33	2
CFR Cluj	2016–17	20	2	2	0	–		22	2
Osijek	2017–18	13	0	–		8	0	21	0
Osijek	2018–19	13	1	2	0	4	0	19	1
	Total	262	16	28	3	12	0	302	19
