= Božo Musa =

Bosnian footballer

Personal information
- Date of birth: 15 September 1988 (age 38)
- Place of birth: Široki Brijeg, SFR Yugoslavia
- Height: 1.90 m (6 ft 3 in)
- Position: Defender

Team information
- Current team: Posušje
- Number: 26

Youth career
- 1997–2007: Široki Brijeg

Senior career*
Years	Team	Apps	(Gls)
2007–2009	Zmaj Makarska		
2009	Jadran Luka Ploče		
2010	Croatia Sesvete	1	(0)
2010	Neretva	15	(0)
2011	Vrapče	15	(0)
2011	Vinjani		
2012	RNK Split	2	(0)
2012–2013	Branitelj	23	(3)
2013–2015	NK Zagreb	69	(1)
2016–2019	Slaven Belupo	90	(0)
2019–2021	Miedź Legnica	41	(2)
2021–2026	Široki Brijeg	79	(2)
2026–	Posušje	1	(0)
- * Club domestic league appearances and goals as of 14 August 2026

Božo Musa (born 15 September 1988) is a Bosnian professional footballer who plays as a defender for First League of the Federation of Bosnia and Herzegovina club Posušje.

== Club career ==
A native of Široki Brijeg, Musa went through all the ranks of the NK Široki Brijeg academy, even featuring once for his youth national team, but started his career at the Croatian 3. HNL club Zmaj Makarska. He went on to feature in a series of lower-tier clubs, along with very brief stints at top-tier Sesvete and RNK Split.

In 2012, he returned to Bosnia and Herzegovina, playing a season for second-tier club Branitelj in Mostar, but moved back to Croatia the following season, signing for 2. HNL side NK Zagreb. Attaining promotion with the club, he remained in Zagreb playing in the 1. HNL until he annulled his contract due to unpaid wages in the summer of 2015. Musa signed with Slaven Belupo in early 2016. On 3 January 2019, he joined Polish club Miedź Legnica.

On 8 February 2021, Musa signed a two-and-a-half-year contract with his boyhood club Široki Brijeg, playing in the Bosnian Premier League. He made his official debut for the club on 28 February 2021, in a league game against Mladost Doboj Kakanj.
