= Neven Laštro =

Bosnian footballer

Personal information
- Date of birth: 1 October 1988 (age 38)
- Place of birth: Zenica, Bosnia and Herzegovina
- Height: 1.88 m (6 ft 2 in)
- Position: Defender

Team information
- Current team: Sesvete
- Number: 18

Senior career*
Years	Team	Apps	(Gls)
2008	NK Kresevo-Stanic	3	(0)
2008-2009	ASKÖ Gmünd	24	(1)
2010	Suhopolje	26	(1)
2011–2014	Travnik	71	(2)
2014–2015	Široki Brijeg	7	(0)
2015	Osijek	16	(2)
2015–2016	Zrinjski	25	(2)
2016–2017	Mladost DK	21	(1)
2017–2019	Zrinjski	10	(0)
2019–2020	Than Quảng Ninh	38	(3)
2021	Cibalia	15	(0)
2022	Karlovac	11	(2)
2022–	Sesvete	29	(2)
- * Club domestic league appearances and goals as of 22 October 2023

Neven Laštro (born 1 October 1988 in Bosnia and Herzegovina) is a Bosnian footballer who now plays for Sesvete in the Croatian Second Football League.

== Club career ==
Lastro started his senior career with NK Kresevo-Stanic. After that, he played for ASKÖ Gmünd, HNK Suhopolje, NK Pitomača, NK Travnik, NK Široki Brijeg, NK Osijek, HŠK Zrinjski Mostar, and FK Mladost Doboj Kakanj. In 2019, he signed for CLB Than Quảng Ninh in the Vietnamese V.League 1, where he has made twenty-six league appearances and scored one goal.
