= Mario Burić =

Croatian footballer

Personal information
- Full name: Mario Burić
- Date of birth: 25 October 1991 (age 35)
- Place of birth: Makarska, Croatia
- Height: 1.88 m (6 ft 2 in)
- Position: Defender

Team information
- Current team: Jarun
- Number: 24

Youth career
- 2002-2010: NK Zmaj

Senior career*
Years	Team	Apps	(Gls)
–2010	NK Zmaj		
2011–2013	Lučko	44	(2)
2013–2015	LASK	26	(0)
2014–2015	→ Union St. Florian (loan)	27	(3)
2015–2016	ViOn Zlaté Moravce	17	(0)
2016–2017	Slaven Belupo	35	(2)
2017–2019	Lokomotiva Zagreb	51	(1)
2019–2020	Béziers	8	(0)
2019-2020	→ Béziers II	6	(0)
2020	Rudeš	7	(0)
2021	Hrvatski Dragovoljac	17	(1)
2021-	EN Paralimni	0	(0)
2022-	Jarun	17	(1)
- * Club domestic league appearances and goals as of 19 June 2023

Mario Burić (born 25 October 1991), is a Croatian professional footballer who plays for second tier-side Jarun Zagfreb as a defender.

== Club career ==
Burić played in the Austrian Regionalliga and made his professional debut for ViOn Zlaté Moravce against Slovan Bratislava on 19 July 2015.

== Career statistics ==
=== Club ===
As of match played 8 November 2019

Appearances and goals by club, season and competition
Club	Season	Division	League		Cup		Other		Total	
Club	Season	Division	Apps	Goals	Apps	Goals	Apps	Goals	Apps	Goals
Lučko	2011–12	Prva HNL	17	0	0	0	—		17	0
Lučko	2012–13	Druga HNL	27	2	0	0	–		27	2
Lučko	Total		44	2	0	0	0	0	44	2
LASK	2013–14	Austrian Regionalliga Central	26	0	2	0	2 (Note: Appearances in the Regionalliga promotion playoffs)	0	30	0
St. Florian (loan)	2014–15	Austrian Regionalliga Central	27	3	0	0	—		27	3
Zlaté Moravce	2015–16	Slovak Super Liga	17	0	2	0	—		19	0
Slaven Belupo	2015–16	Prva HNL	5	0	0	0	—		5	0
Slaven Belupo	2016–17	Prva HNL	30	2	3	0	—		33	2
Slaven Belupo	Total		35	2	3	0	0	0	38	2
Lokomotiva Zagreb	2017–18	Prva HNL	29	1	4	0	—		33	1
Lokomotiva Zagreb	2018–19	Prva HNL	22	0	2	0	—		24	0
Lokomotiva Zagreb	Total		51	1	6	0	0	0	57	1
Béziers	2019–20	National	5	0	0	0	0	0	5	0
Career total			205	8	13	0	2	0	220	8
