= Ivan Čeliković =

Croatian footballer (1989–2023)

Personal information
- Date of birth: 10 April 1989
- Place of birth: Nova Gradiška, SR Croatia, Yugoslavia
- Date of death: 11 December 2023 (aged 34)
- Place of death: Čilipi, Croatia
- Height: 1.74 m (5 ft 9 in)
- Positions: Left-back; left midfielder

Youth career
- Budućnost Rešetari
- 2001–2007: Hajduk Split

Senior career*
Years	Team	Apps	(Gls)
2007-2008	Hajduk Split	0	(0)
2007–2008	→ Konavljanin (loan)		
2008–2009	Konavljanin	43	(1)
2010	Dugopolje		
2010–2011	Solin	18	(1)
2011–2012	Konavljanin	25	(2)
2012–2017	Inter Zaprešić	122	(6)
2017–2018	Shkëndija	20	(0)
2018–2020	Inter Zaprešić	41	(0)
2020–2022	Lokomotiva	29	(0)
2021	→ Jarun (loan)	5	(0)
2022–2023	Konavljanin	28	(1)
- * Club domestic league appearances and goals

Ivan Čeliković (10 April 1989 – 11 December 2023) was a Croatian professional footballer who played as a left-back.

== Career ==
Born in Nova Gradiška, Čeliković started playing football at local club Budućnost Rešetari before moving to Hajduk Split. He started his senior career on loan to third-tier NK Konavljanin, before moving on fully for a year and a half there. He would go on to spend half a season at NK Dugopolje in 2010, a second-tier season at NK Solin, and an additional season at Konavljanin before he got his break and arrived at first-tier Inter Zaprešić in 2012. In September 2015, he scored his first goal in the Prva HNL, finding the net in the 94th minute of a 3–1 defeat against Osijek. In February 2016, Spanish club Rayo Vallecano indicated interest in securing his services. He was also included in the team of the season in the 2015–16 Prva HNL Team of the Season.

In January 2017, Čeliković switched clubs and countries and signed for Macedonian club Shkëndija, with whom he penned a one-year contract. He scored his first goal for the club in a draw against Finnish club HJK Helsinki.

== Death ==
Čeliković died on 11 December 2023, at the age of 34.
