= Antonio Perošević =

Croatian footballer

Personal information
- Date of birth: 6 March 1992 (age 34)
- Place of birth: Split, Croatia
- Height: 1.80 m (5 ft 11 in)
- Positions: Forward; winger

Team information
- Current team: Čepin

Youth career
- 2003–2011: Osijek

Senior career*
Years	Team	Apps	(Gls)
2010–2017	Osijek	148	(39)
2017–2018	Puskás Akadémia	22	(9)
2018–2019	→ Ittihad Kalba (loan)	5	(2)
2019–2021	Újpest	35	(8)
2021–2022	East Bengal	14	(6)
2023	Slaven Belupo	16	(0)
2023	Podbeskidzie	8	(0)
2024–2025	BSK Bijelo Brdo	16	(3)
2026–	Čepin	0	(0)

International career^{‡}
2010	Croatia U18	7	(0)
2012	Croatia U20	8	(0)
2017	Croatia	2	(0)
- * Club domestic league appearances and goals as of 10 March 2026 ‡ National team caps and goals as of 21 August 2023

Antonio Perošević (Croatian pronunciation: [perǒːʃeʋitɕ]; born 6 March 1992) is a Croatian professional footballer who plays as a forward for Croatian Second Football League club Čepin.

== Club career ==
Perošević started his career playing at youth level for his hometown club Osijek with whom he had signed a scholarship contract in February 2010. He made his debut for the first team as a late substitute in a 2–0 win against Cibalia on 13 May 2010 in the last round of 2009–10 season. After injuries kept him out of action for a year, he returned for the second part of the 2011–12 season. He scored his first goal in Prva HNL in a 2–1 defeat against Cibalia on 11 March 2012, converting a first-half penalty. He finished the season as Osijek's top league goalscorer with seven goals.

On 30 August 2017, Perošević moved abroad for the first time, signing for Hungarian club Puskás Akadémia. A year later, he moved on to Al-Ittihad Kalba SC in the United Arab Emirates.

On 23 September 2021, Perošević moved to India and signed with Indian Super League side SC East Bengal. He scored 4 goals in 14 matches as his team finished in bottom of the league table.

In January 2023, Perošević returned to Croatia, signing for Slaven Belupo.

On 21 August 2023, he joined Polish I liga club Podbeskidzie Bielsko-Biała on a one-year deal, with an extension option for another year. On 4 January 2024, he left the club by mutual consent.

== International career ==
Perošević made his senior international debut on 11 January 2017 against Chile at the China Cup, that ended 1–1. His second and final international was against the hosts at that same tournament.

== Career statistics ==
=== Club ===
As of 3 January 2024

Appearances and goals by club, season and competition
Club	Division	League			Cup		Continental		Total	
Club	Division	Division	Apps	Goals	Apps	Goals	Apps	Goals	Apps	Goals
Osijek	2009–10	Prva HNL	1	0	—		—		1	0
Osijek	2010–11	Prva HNL	1	0	1	0	—		2	0
Osijek	2011–12	Prva HNL	12	6	3	0	—		15	7
Osijek	2012–13	Prva HNL	22	5	2	0	4 (Note: Appearance(s) in UEFA Europa League)	1	28	6
Osijek	2013–14	Prva HNL	8	0	1	0	—		9	0
Osijek	2014–15	Prva HNL	23	6	2	0	—		25	6
Osijek	2015–16	Prva HNL	23	6	3	2	—		26	8
Osijek	2016–17	Prva HNL	26	7	3	2	—		29	9
Osijek	2017–18	Prva HNL	6	2	0	0	3	0	9	2
Osijek	Total		122	32	15	4	7	1	144	37
Puskás Akadémia	2017–18	Nemzeti Bajnokság I	22	2	8	5	—		30	7
Al-Ittihad Kalba (loan)	2018–19	Pro League	0	0	0	0	—		0	0
Újpest	2019–20	Nemzeti Bajnokság I	16	0	3	1	—		19	1
Újpest	2020–21	Nemzeti Bajnokság I	19	4	5	2	—		24	6
Újpest	Total		35	4	8	3	0	0	43	7
East Bengal	2021–22	Indian Super League	14	4	0	0	—		14	4
Slaven Belupo	2022–23	HNL	13	0	0	0	—		13	0
Podbeskidzie	2023–24	I liga	3	0	1	0	—		4	0
Career total			209	42	32	13	7	1	248	56

=== International ===
As of match played 23 September 2021

Appearances and goals by national team and year
National team	Year	Apps	Goals
Croatia	2017	2	0
Total		2	0
