= Ivica Džolan =

Croatian footballer (born 1988)

Personal information
- Date of birth: 11 October 1988 (age 38)
- Place of birth: Prozor-Rama, Yugoslavia
- Height: 1.91 m (6 ft 3 in)
- Position: Centre-back

Team information
- Current team: Novaki

Youth career
- 1999–2006: Dinamo Zagreb

Senior career*
| Years | Team | Apps | (Gls) |
| 2007–2013 | Zagreb | 25 | (0) |
| 2013–2015 | Rudeš | 52 | (4) |
| 2015–2017 | Osijek | 13 | (1) |
| 2017–2018 | Fjölnir | 19 | (2) |
| 2018 | Rudeš | 1 | (0) |
| 2020– | Novaki | | |

International career
| 2007 | Croatia U19 | 1 | (0) |
- * Club domestic league appearances and goals as of 14:00, 19 October 2017 (UTC)

Ivica Džolan (born 11 October 1988) is a Croatian footballer who plays as a central defender for Novaki.

== Club career ==
Džolan kicked off his career with the youth academy of Dinamo Zagreb and in 2007 joined NK Zagreb. After failing to make regular appearances for the side, he moved to second-tier club Rudeš in 2013. While at Rudeš, he attracted the interest of Dutch club Heerenveen.

After having played a friendly match for Osijek, Džolan signed for the Prva HNL side and penned a two-year contract on 7 July 2015. On 8 August 2016, he scored his only goal for the club in the 87th minute of a league match against Lokomotiva which saw Osijek win the match by 3–2.

In March 2017, NK Osijek announced by their official website that Džolan's contract was terminated by mutual consent after he was deemed surplus by manager Zoran Zekić. Subsequently, he headed abroad for the first time and signed for Icelandic club Fjölnir. He scored 2 goals in 19 league matches for Fjölnir.
