= Davor Špehar =

Croatian footballer

Personal information
- Date of birth: 9 February 1988 (age 38)
- Place of birth: Zagreb, SR Croatia, SFR Yugoslavia
- Height: 1.80 m (5 ft 11 in)
- Position: Centre back

Youth career
- 2001-2006: Dinamo Zagreb

Senior career*
| Years | Team | Apps | (Gls) |
| 2007 | Dinamo Zagreb | 0 | (0) |
| 2007 | → Bjelovar (loan) | 13 | (0) |
| 2007–2014 | Hrvatski Dragovoljac | 140 | (4) |
| 2014–2015 | Osijek | 12 | (0) |
| 2015 | Lučko | 11 | (0) |
| 2016 | Vinogradar | 16 | (0) |
| 2017 | Sesvetski Kraljevec | 11 | (2) |

International career
| 2004–2005 | Croatia U-16 | 2 | (0) |
| 2003–2005 | Croatia U-17 | 27 | (0) |
| 2005–2006 | Croatia U-18 | 5 | (0) |
| 2005–2007 | Croatia U-19 | 21 | (0) |
- * Club domestic league appearances and goals as of 9 June 2021

Davor Špehar (born 9 February 1988) is a retired Croatian football player.

== Career ==
Špehar started his career in the Dinamo Zagreb academy, a constant fixture of Croatia U-17 and Croatia U-19 teams between 2003 and 2007. While he was still eligible to play for the U-19 team, he was sent on loan to NK Bjelovar in the Druga HNL. Dinamo did not sign a professional contract with him, however, so he moved, aged 19, to the Druga HNL side NK Hrvatski Dragovoljac. He remained at the club for the following 7 seasons, playing mostly at the center-back position, including their 10/11 and 13/14 Prva HNL bouts. During the latter, he achieved a feat unique for the league - scoring 2 goals (his only goals of the season) and an own goal in the 2-2 match against RNK Split.

In the summer of 2014, following Dragovoljac's relegation, he joined NK Osijek. After a season at the club, Špehar moved on to the second-tier NK Lučko, followed by a year at the third-tier NK Vinogradar and one more at fourth-tier Sesvetski Kraljevec before retiring from football at the end of 2017.
