= Marin Glavaš =

Croatian footballer (born 1992)

Personal information
- Full name: Marin Glavaš
- Date of birth: 17 March 1992 (age 34)
- Place of birth: Imotski, Croatia
- Height: 1.78 m (5 ft 10 in)
- Position: Winger

Team information
- Current team: Markt Allhau
- Number: 18

Youth career
- –2007: Imotski
- 2007–2011: Osijek

Senior career*
Years	Team	Apps	(Gls)
2011–2015	Osijek	59	(4)
2015	ViOn Zlaté Moravce	18	(1)
2016	Ararat Yerevan	4	(0)
2016	Celje	11	(1)
2017	Oulu	8	(0)
2018	Bad Radkersburg	11	(0)
2018	Allerheiligen	14	(6)
2019	Horn	10	(0)
2019	Weiz	11	(4)
2020	Široki Brijeg	2	(0)
2020-2021	Krško	8	(0)
2021-	Markt Allhau	22	(8)

International career
2011–2012	Croatia U20	3	(0)
- * Club domestic league appearances and goals as of 25 March 2021

Marin Glavaš (born 17 March 1992) is a Croatian professional footballer who plays as a winger, currently playing for UFC Markt Allhau in the Austrian fourth tier-Burgenlandliga.

== Club career ==
Glavaš, originally from Imotski, moved to Osijek aged 15. He made his league debut on 6 August 2011 in a 4–0 home win against NK Zagreb, at 19 years of age, coming in for Srđan Vidaković in the 84th minute. He scored his first league goal in the 2–0 home win against Hajduk Split on 24 August 2014.

In February 2016, Glavaš joined Ararat Yerevan for their training camp in the United States, joining them permanently on 24 February.

In March 2017, Glavaš signed for Finnish second-tier club Oulu for the 2017 season.

After spending 2 years in Austria playing for four different clubs, Glavaš signed a six-month contract with a possibility of a two-year extension with Bosnian Premier League club Široki Brijeg on 23 January 2020. He made his official debut for Široki Brijeg in a 3–2 away win against Mladost Doboj Kakanj on 29 February 2020. Glavaš left Široki Brijeg on 10 June 2020 after his contract with the club expired.
