= Borna Barišić =

Croatian footballer (born 1992)

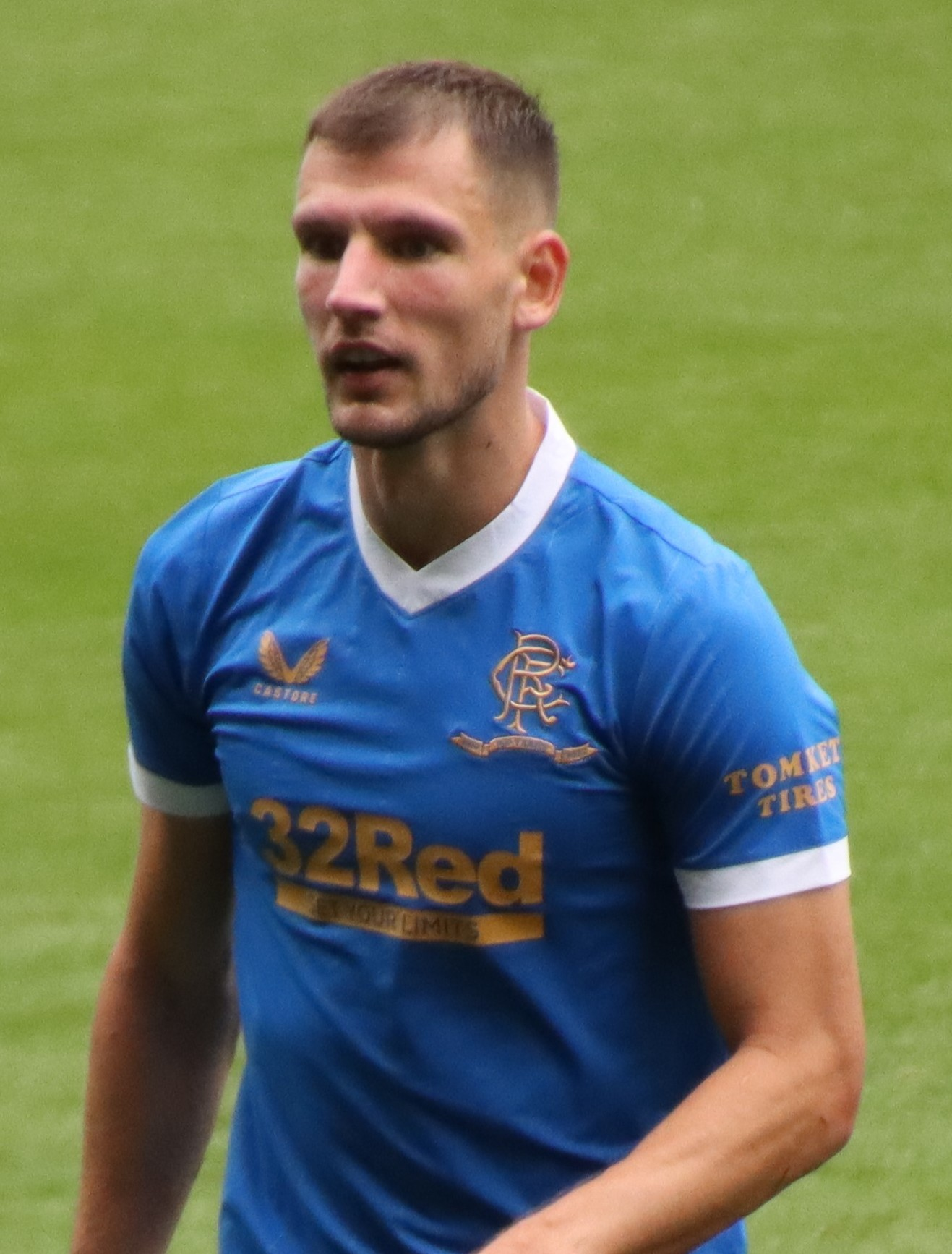
- Barišić with Rangers in 2021

Personal information
- Full name: Borna Barišić
- Date of birth: 10 November 1992 (age 34)
- Place of birth: Osijek, Croatia
- Height: 1.86 m (6 ft 1 in)
- Position: Left-back

Youth career
- 2003–2011: Osijek

Senior career*
Years	Team	Apps	(Gls)
2012–2013	BSK Bijelo Brdo		
2013–2015	Osijek	55	(6)
2015–2016	Dinamo Zagreb	4	(0)
2015–2016	→ Lokomotiva (loan)	23	(0)
2016–2018	Osijek	61	(4)
2018–2024	Rangers	163	(7)
2024–2025	Trabzonspor	11	(0)
2025	→ Leganés (loan)	3	(0)
2026–	Osijek	15	(1)

International career^{‡}
2017–2025	Croatia	41	(2)
Medal record
Men's football
Representing Croatia
FIFA World Cup
Third place	2022 Qatar
UEFA Nations League
Runner-up	2023 Netherlands
- * Club domestic league appearances and goals as of 15 June 2026 ‡ National team caps and goals as of 5 September 2024

Borna Barišić (Croatian pronunciation: [bôːrna bǎriʃitɕ]; born 10 November 1992) is a Croatian professional footballer who plays as a left-back for Osijek.

Barišić previously played for Rangers in the Scottish Premiership, Dinamo Zagreb, BSK Bijelo Brdo, and Osijek in the Prva HNL and Trabzonspor in Turkish Süper Lig. He also had loan spells at CD Leganés and Lokomotiva Zagreb.

== Club career ==
Barišić was born in Osijek in the eastern Croatian region of Slavonia to Bosnian Croat parents. His father Stipe "Moljac" Barišić hails from Galečić, while his mother Verica (née Tokić) hails from Stražbenica. He joined the youth academy of Osijek in 2003, spending eight years with the side. After failing to break into the first team, Barišić moved to nearby BSK Bijelo Brdo.

=== Osijek ===
After a single season with Bijelo Brdo, Barišić returned to Osijek. In his first season with the first team, Barišić managed 23 Prva HNL appearances, debuting on 12 July 2013 in a 3–1 loss to Dinamo Zagreb. Barišić first goal for Osijek came on 4 April 2014 in the form on an 88th-minute winner against Lokomotiva. Osijek finished in 8th place in the 2013–14 season. The following season, Barišić played in 28 games, managing one goal and two assists from left back as Osijek narrowly avoided relegation.

=== Dinamo Zagreb and Lokomotiva ===
Despite his club's struggles, Barišić's performance for Osijek in the 2014–15 season saw him earn a move to league champions Dinamo, signing a five-year contract. Barišić's made his debut for his new club against his former club Osijek on 19 July 2015. In late August, however, Barišić was loaned out to Dinamo's feeder club Lokomotiva. At Lokomotiva, Barišić made 19 league appearances, managing two assists.

=== Return to Osijek ===
Osijek were purchased in February 2016 by Hungarian oligarch Lőrinc Mészáros and Croatian entrepreneur Ivan Meštrović, the first time the club had gone into private ownership. The new ownership identified Barišić as the type of player they want representing the club; young, talented and produced by the youth academy. Barišić subsequently agreed to the transfer and was appointed captain of his junior club. Barišić made his returning debut for Osijek on 23 July 2016, captaining the club to a 2–0 win over Inter Zaprešić. Barišić made 32 league appearances, scoring once and assisting seven times as Osijek finished 4th, its highest league finish in nearly 10 years.

In summer 2017, Barišić drew attention from Ukrainian club Dynamo Kyiv, and he agreed personal terms with the club. However, at the last minute, Dynamo opted for Dinamo Zagreb's Josip Pivarić. In an interview with Sportske novosti on 11 August, Barišić publicly called out Dinamo for sabotaging the transfer. On 22 August, Dinamo Zagreb executive Zdravko Mamić was shot in his native village of Zidine, Bosnia and Herzegovina. The shooting was believed to be an assassination attempt organized by the Čepin Mafia clan, of which Barišić's father Stipe is a member.

In the 2017–18 UEFA Europa League qualifying, Barišić scored a penalty in a 1–0 away win for Osijek over PSV Eindhoven. Osijek would go on to win the home leg 1–0, knocking out PSV from the competition. Barišić made 22 appearances in the league, scoring once and assisting four times as the club again finished in fourth place.

=== Rangers ===
On 7 August 2018, Barišić signed a four-year deal with Scottish side Rangers for a reported £2.2 million. He joined the club after having just played against Rangers in the 2018–19 UEFA Europa League qualifying phase.

After an injury hit first season, on 29 December 2019, Barišić assisted both goals and was named Man of the Match in a 2–1 victory over Celtic, the first win at Celtic Park for Rangers since 2010. On 30 January 2020, he signed a new contract that would see him stay at the club until 2024.

On 18 February 2021, in his hundredth appearance for the club, Barišić scored a brace from the penalty spot in a 4–3 away win over Royal Antwerp in the Europa League Round of 32.

=== Trabzonspor ===
On 25 June 2024, Turkish side Trabzonspor announced that Barišić would join the club on a free transfer, signing a three-year deal.

==== Loan to Leganés ====
On 4 February 2025, Barišić joined La Liga side Leganés on loan for the remainder of the season. In the 10th minute of his first game for Leganés, Barišić suffered an ACL tear.

==== Release by Trabzonspor ====
On 1 September 2025, Barišić's contract with Trabzonspor was mutually terminated.

== International career ==
On 11 January 2017, Barišić made his Croatia national team debut in a friendly match against Chile. In May 2018, he was named in Croatia's preliminary 32-man squad for the 2018 World Cup in Russia but did not make the final 23.

On 21 March 2019, Barišić scored his debut international goal in a UEFA Euro 2020 qualifying against Azerbaijan, which ended in a 2–1 victory for Croatia. By the end of qualifying, he solidified his spot in the national team's starting XI.

On 17 May 2021, Barišić was included in the 26-man Croatia squad for the delayed UEFA Euro 2020 tournament.

On 9 November 2022, Barišić was later called up to the squad for the 2022 FIFA World Cup in Qatar.

== Career statistics ==
=== Club ===
As of match played 22 August 2024

Appearances and goals by club, season and competition
Club	Season	League			National cup (Note: Includes Croatian Cup, Scottish Cup)		League cup (Note: Includes Scottish League Cup)		Europe		Total	
Club	Season	Division	Apps	Goals	Apps	Goals	Apps	Goals	Apps	Goals	Apps	Goals
Osijek	2013–14	Prva HNL	21	2	1	0	—		—		22	2
Osijek	2014–15	Prva HNL	28	1	0	0	—		—		28	1
Osijek	Total		49	3	1	0	—		—		50	3
Dinamo Zagreb	2015–16	Prva HNL	1	0	0	0	—		0	0	1	0
Lokomotiva (loan)	2015–16	Prva HNL	19	0	1	0	—		0	0	20	0
Osijek	2016–17	Prva HNL	32	1	4	0	—		—		36	1
Osijek	2017–18	Prva HNL	22	1	1	0	—		8 (Note: Appearances in UEFA Europa League)	2	31	3
Osijek	2018–19	Prva HNL	1	0	0	0	—		4	1	5	1
Osijek	Total		55	2	5	0	—		12	3	72	5
Rangers	2018–19	Scottish Premiership	16	0	3	0	1	0	2	0	22	0
Rangers	2019–20	Scottish Premiership	22	2	2	0	3	0	13	0	40	2
Rangers	2020–21	Scottish Premiership	33	1	2	0	2	1	13	3	50	5
Rangers	2021–22	Scottish Premiership	23	0	2	0	1	0	17 (Note: Two appearances in UEFA Champions League, fifteen appearances in UEFA Europa League)	0	43	0
Rangers	2022–23	Scottish Premiership	30	1	4	1	2	0	10 (Note: Appearances in UEFA Champions League)	0	46	2
Rangers	2023–24	Scottish Premiership	20	0	3	1	3	0	9	0	35	1
Rangers	Total		144	4	16	2	12	1	64	3	236	10
Trabzonspor	2024–25	Süper Lig	1	0	0	0	—		4 (Note: Three appearances in UEFA Europa League, one appearance in UEFA Conference League)	0	5	0
Career total			269	9	23	2	12	1	80	6	384	18

=== International ===
As of match played 15 October 2023

Appearances and goals by national team and year
National team	Year	Apps	Goals
Croatia	2017	3	0
Croatia	2018	1	0
Croatia	2019	8	1
Croatia	2020	3	0
Croatia	2021	8	0
Croatia	2022	6	0
Croatia	2023	6	0
Total		35	1

Scores and results list Croatia's goal tally first, score column indicates score after each Barišić goal.

List of international goals scored by Borna Barišić
No.	Date	Venue	Cap	Opponent	Score	Result	Competition
1	21 March 2019	Stadion Maksimir, Zagreb, Croatia	5	Azerbaijan	1–1	2–1	UEFA Euro 2020 qualifying

== Honours ==
Dinamo Zagreb

- Prva HNL: 2015–16

Rangers

- Scottish Premiership: 2020–21
- Scottish Cup: 2021–22
- Scottish League Cup: 2023–24; runner-up: 2019–20, 2022–23
- UEFA Europa League runner-up: 2021–22

Croatia

- FIFA World Cup third place: 2022
- UEFA Nations League runner-up: 2022–23

Individual

- Croatian First Football League Team of the Year: 2016–17
- PFA Scotland Team of the Year: 2020–21 Scottish Premiership
