= Mario Maslać =

Serbian footballer

Personal information
- Full name: Mario Maslać
- Date of birth: 9 September 1990 (age 36)
- Place of birth: Novi Sad, SFR Yugoslavia
- Height: 1.90 m (6 ft 3 in)
- Position: Centre-back

Youth career
- 2001–2002: Novi Sad
- 2003–2008: Vojvodina

Senior career*
Years	Team	Apps	(Gls)
2008–2009	Veternik		
2009–2015	Borac Čačak	105	(1)
2015	Osijek	7	(0)
2016–2017	Borac Čačak	26	(1)
2017	Vojvodina	8	(1)
2017	Irtysh	13	(0)
2018	Riga	3	(0)
2019	Belasica	16	(1)
2019	Akademija Pandev	17	(1)
2020	Radnički Niš	5	(0)
2020	Akademija Pandev	12	(1)
2021–2022	PSS Sleman	26	(4)
2023	Loznica	2	(0)
2023	Dolný Kubín	8	(1)
2024–2025	Foshan Nanshi	47	(4)

International career
2011	Serbia U21	1	(0)
- * Club domestic league appearances and goals as of 1 November 2025

Mario Maslać (Serbian Cyrillic: Марио Маслаћ; born 9 September 1990) is a Serbian professional footballer who plays as a centre-back.

== Club career ==
Maslać made his senior debut with Veternik in the 2008–09 season, before moving to Borac Čačak in the summer of 2009.

On 16 June 2017, Maslać signed a one-year contract with Irtysh Pavlodar, with his contract being cancelled by mutual consent on 26 January 2018. He joined Riga for the 2018 season.

On 3 March 2024, Maslać joined China League One club Foshan Nanshi.

== International career ==
Maslać played for the Serbian national under-21 team at the Valeriy Lobanovskyi Memorial Tournament in 2011.

== Career statistics ==
As of match played 1 November 2025

Appearances and goals by club, season and competition
Club	Season	League			Cup		Continental		Other		Total	
Club	Season	Division	Apps	Goals	Apps	Goals	Apps	Goals	Apps	Goals	Apps	Goals
Borac Čačak	2009–10	Serbian SuperLiga	7	0	0	0	—		—		7	0
Borac Čačak	2010–11	Serbian SuperLiga	24	0	1	0	—		—		25	0
Borac Čačak	2011–12	Serbian SuperLiga	21	1	4	0	—		—		25	1
Borac Čačak	2012–13	Serbian First League	20	0	2	1	—		—		22	1
Borac Čačak	2013–14	Serbian First League	18	0	1	1	—		—		19	1
Borac Čačak	2014–15	Serbian SuperLiga	15	0	0	0	—		—		15	0
Borac Čačak	Total		105	1	8	2	—		—		113	3
Osijek	2015–16	1. HNL	7	0	0	0	—		—		7	0
Borac Čačak	2015–16	Serbian SuperLiga	14	1	3	1	—		—		17	2
Borac Čačak	2016–17	Serbian SuperLiga	12	0	1	0	—		—		13	0
Borac Čačak	Total		26	1	4	1	—		—		30	2
Vojvodina	2016–17	Serbian SuperLiga	8	1	0	0	—		—		8	1
Irtysh	2017	Kazakhstan Premier League	13	0	0	0	4	1	—		17	1
Riga	2018	Virslīga	3	0	0	0	—		—		3	0
Belasica	2018–19	Macedonian First Football League	16	1	0	0	—		—		16	1
Akademija Pandev	2019–20	Macedonian First Football League	17	1	0	0	—		—		17	1
Radnički Niš	2019–20	Serbian SuperLiga	5	0	0	0	—		—		5	0
Akademija Pandev	2020–21	Macedonian First Football League	12	1	0	0	—		—		12	1
PSS Sleman	2021–22	Liga 1	26	4	1	0	—		—		27	4
Loznica	2022–23	Serbian First League	2	0	0	0	—		—		2	0
Dolný Kubín	2023–24	2. Liga	8	1	0	0	—		—		8	1
Foshan Nanshi	2024	China League One	22	1	1	0	—		—		23	1
Foshan Nanshi	2025	China League One	25	3	0	0	—		—		25	3
Foshan Nanshi	Total		47	4	1	1	—		—		48	4
Career total			295	15	14	3	4	1	—		313	19

== Honours ==
=== Club ===
PSS Sleman

- Menpora Cup third place: 2021
