= Josip Špoljarić =

Croatian footballer

Personal information
- Date of birth: 5 January 1997 (age 29)
- Place of birth: Osijek, Croatia
- Height: 1.84 m (6 ft 0 in)
- Position: Striker

Team information
- Current team: Vukovar
- Number: 50

Youth career
- 2006–2014: Osijek

Senior career*
Years	Team	Apps	(Gls)
2014–2023	Osijek	67	(5)
2016–2017	Osijek II	25	(18)
2017	→ Dugopolje (loan)	18	(6)
2018	→ Santarcangelo (loan)	12	(1)
2018	Osijek II	15	(13)
2020–2021	→ Istra 1961 (loan)	25	(4)
2021–2022	→ Zalaegerszeg (loan)	29	(6)
2023–2025	Zalaegerszeg	14	(2)
2025	Nafta 1903	10	(7)
2025–	Vukovar	13	(0)

International career
2012	Croatia U15	4	(0)
2012	Croatia U16	1	(0)
2013	Croatia U17	9	(2)
2014	Croatia U18	5	(1)
2014–2016	Croatia U19	14	(4)
- * Club domestic league appearances and goals as of 15 June 2026

Josip Špoljarić (born 5 January 1997) is a Croatian professional footballer who plays for Vukovar.

== Club career ==
Špoljarić spent his entire youth career in his hometown club NK Osijek. A youth international, he was chosen in the summer of 2014 as the best player of the Croatian U-17 football league. He debuted for the first team on 11 August 2014, aged 17, in the 2–1 away loss against HNK Hajduk Split, and scored his first senior goal against the same opponent in the 3–2 home loss on 9 May 2015.

On 28 July 2021, Špoljarić joined Zalaegerszeg in Hungary on a season-long loan.
