= Goran Roce =

Croatian footballer (born 1986)

Personal information
- Date of birth: 12 April 1986 (age 40)
- Place of birth: Pula, SFR Yugoslavia
- Height: 1.83 m (6 ft 0 in)
- Position: Midfielder

Senior career*
Years	Team	Apps	(Gls)
2003–2004	Žminj		
2004–2005	Waidhofen/Ybbs	14	(1)
2005	Örgryte	0	(0)
2005–2007	Žminj		(15)
2007–2013	Istra 1961	134	(20)
2013–2015	RNK Split	52	(5)
2015–2016	Osijek	24	(2)
2016–2017	Istra 1961	31	(8)
2017–2018	Xanthi	11	(0)
2018	Istra 1961	16	(3)

International career^{‡}
2002	Croatia U16	5	(1)
- * Club domestic league appearances and goals as of 26 August 2018 ‡ National team caps and goals as of 21 November 2015

Goran Roce (born 12 April 1986) is a Croatian retired footballer who last played for NK Istra 1961.

== Club career ==
Roce started his career in 2003 with Žminj in Croatia's 3. HNL. Following a couple of seasons with his home club, Roce had stints with Waidhofen/Ybbs in the Austrian Regional League East and Örgryte in the 2005 Allsvenskan. In 2007, Roce moved to Istra 1961 where he stayed for six consecutive seasons, including the last four seasons in the 1. HNL. He scored his first goal in 1. HNL in a 2–4 defeat against Međimurje on 8 August 2009. Roce was the club's top goalscorer during the 2012–13 season, when he netted 11 goals. In 2013, he moved to RNK Split, where he stayed for two seasons. He collected six appearances for the club during the 2014–15 UEFA Europa League. In 2015, he moved to Osijek, another 1. HNL club. On 1 July 2017, he signed with Super League club Xanthi.

=== Career statistics (from 2007 onwards) ===
Season	Club	League	League		Cup		Europe		Total	
Season	Club	League	Apps	Goals	Apps	Goals	Apps	Goals	Apps	Goals
2007–08	Istra 1961	2. HNL	20	2	–		–		20	2
2008–09	Istra 1961	2. HNL	17	0	1	0	–		18	0
2009–10	Istra 1961	1. HNL	26	3	2	0	–		28	3
2010–11	Istra 1961	1. HNL	23	1	2	0	–		25	1
2011–12	Istra 1961	1. HNL	23	3	4	0	–		27	3
2012–13	Istra 1961	1. HNL	25	11	2	1	–		27	12
2013–14	RNK Split	1. HNL	29	2	–		–		29	2
2014–15	RNK Split	1. HNL	23	3	5	2	6	0	34	5
2015–16	Osijek	1. HNL	24	2	1	0	–		25	2
2016–17	Istra 1961	1. HNL	31	8	1	0	–		32	8
2017–18	Xanthi	Super League Greece	11	0	3	0	–		14	0
2017–18	Istra 1961	1. HNL	14	3	–		–		14	3
2018–19	Istra 1961	1. HNL	2	0	–		–		2	0
Career Total			268	38	21	3	6	0	295	41
Last Update: 26 August 2018.
