= Hrvoje Kurtović =

Croatian footballer (born 1983)

Personal information
- Date of birth: 6 October 1983 (age 43)
- Place of birth: Osijek, SR Croatia, SFR Yugoslavia
- Height: 1.77 m (5 ft 9 1/2 in)
- Position: Defensive midfielder

Senior career*
Years	Team	Apps	(Gls)
2003–2005	Grafičar Vodovod		
2006	Zadar		
2006–2008	Vukovar '91		
2008	Grafičar Vodovod		
2009–2016	Osijek	167	(1)

International career^{‡}
2001	Croatia U18	2	(0)
2001	Croatia U19	2	(0)
- * Club domestic league appearances and goals as of 9 November 2014 ‡ National team caps and goals as of 9 November 2014

Hrvoje Kurtović (born 6 October 1983) is a retired Croatian football midfielder, who last played for Osijek in the Prva HNL.

== Club career ==
Born in Osijek, Croatia, Kurtović got his first opportunity to play for his hometown Prva HNL club, and at the highest level of Croatian football at the beginning of 2009, aged 25, under Tomislav Steinbrückner, after Goran Todorčev got sidelined due to three yellow cards. He remained a fixture in the first team, despite being a strongly divisive figure. He was lauded by some, including his coaches, for tenaciousness and his work rate, but dismissed by many for an alleged lack of technical abilities and proneness to errors. He nevertheless became the team's captain in 2014, after Ivo Smoje's retirement from professional football.
