= Antonio Pavić =

Croatian footballer (born 1994)

Personal information
- Date of birth: 18 November 1994 (age 31)
- Place of birth: Frankfurt, Germany
- Height: 1.77 m (5 ft 10 in)
- Position: Left-back

Youth career
- 2004–2013: Osijek

Senior career*
Years	Team	Apps	(Gls)
2013–2015	Osijek	42	(1)
2015–2016	Koper	23	(0)
2017–2018	Istra 1961	23	(1)
2018–2020	Željezničar	41	(0)
2020–2021	Shkëndija	35	(0)
2022	Gżira United	8	(0)
2022–2023	Velež Mostar	7	(0)
2023–2024	Zagłębie Sosnowiec	5	(0)
2024	Željezničar	1	(0)
Total		185	(2)

International career
2009	Croatia U15	2	(0)
2009–2010	Croatia U16	4	(0)
2010–2011	Croatia U17	8	(0)
2012	Croatia U18	4	(0)
2012–2013	Croatia U19	9	(0)
2014	Croatia U21	1	(0)
- * Club domestic league appearances and goals

Antonio Pavić (born 18 November 1994) is a Croatian former professional footballer who played as a left-back.

== Honours ==
Shkëndija

- Macedonian First League: 2020–21
