= Tomislav Radotić =

Croatian footballer

Personal information
- Date of birth: 13 December 1981 (age 44)
- Place of birth: Osijek, SR Croatia, SFR Yugoslavia
- Height: 1.76 m (5 ft 9 1/2 in)
- Positions: Right-back; defensive midfielder

Youth career
- Osijek

Senior career*
Years	Team	Apps	(Gls)
1999–2001	Grafičar Vodovod		
2001–2005	Belišće		
2005–2006	Metalac Osijek	27	(2)
2006–2012	Cibalia	143	(3)
2012–2015	RNK Split	70	(0)
2015–2016	Osijek	17	(0)
2016–2017	Osijek II		
2017–2021	Tomislav Livana		

Managerial career
- 2021–2022: Osijek II
- 2022–2023: Cibalia
- 2024–2026: Osijek (assistant)
- 2026: Osijek
- * Club domestic league appearances and goals

Tomislav Radotić (born 13 December 1981) is a Croatian professional football manager and former player.

== Playing career ==
Product of the NK Osijek academy, Radotić started his senior career in a string of 2nd and 3rd tier Croatian clubs based in the Osijek-Baranja County. He made his Prva HNL debut in 2006, aged 24, after signing for HNK Cibalia. Radotić was quick to establish himself in the club's first 11, remaining there for six seasons. Initially a defensive midfielder, he found himself more and more placed playing as a right-back, which would become his primary position in later years. His debut in the European competitions came in the Europa League qualifiers in 2010, in games against Cliftonville. After his contract with Cibalia ran out in the summer of 2012, he signed a two-year deal with RNK Split.

== Managerial career ==
In June 2015, Radotić signed a two-year contract with Osijek. He was dismissed as manager of Cibalia in summer 2023.
