= Nikola Mandić (footballer) =

Croatian footballer

Personal information
- Date of birth: 19 March 1995 (age 31)
- Place of birth: Vinkovci, Croatia
- Height: 1.78 m (5 ft 10 in)
- Position: Forward

Team information
- Current team: Sloga Meridian
- Number: 7

Youth career
- 2004–2006: Borac Drenovci
- 2006–2008: Graničar Županja
- 2008–2014: Osijek

Senior career*
Years	Team	Apps	(Gls)
2013–2017	Osijek	47	(2)
2014–2015	→ Cibalia (loan)	25	(4)
2016–2017	→ Dugopolje (loan)	30	(6)
2017–2018	Krško	38	(2)
2019–2021	Krupa	40	(6)
2021–2022	Rudar Prijedor	29	(8)
2022–2023	Zrinjski Mostar	10	(2)
2023–2025	Posušje	43	(2)
2025–	Sloga Meridian	35	(1)

International career
2009	Croatia U14	2	(1)
2010	Croatia U15	3	(0)
2011	Croatia U16	4	(1)
2010–2011	Croatia U17	13	(2)
2013–2014	Croatia U19	10	(0)
- * Club domestic league appearances and goals as of 12 June 2026

Nikola Mandić (born 19 March 1995) is a Croatian professional footballer who plays as a forward for Bosnian Premier League club Sloga Meridian.

== Honours ==
Krupa

- First League of RS: 2019–20
