= Tomislav Čuljak =

Croatian footballer

Personal information
- Date of birth: 25 May 1987 (age 39)
- Place of birth: Vinkovci, Croatia
- Height: 1.75 m (5 ft 9 in)
- Position: Defender

Team information
- Current team: Cibalia (manager)

Senior career*
Years	Team	Apps	(Gls)
2007–2009	Cibalia	24	(1)
2009–2010	Zadar	11	(0)
2010–2012	Cibalia	49	(2)
2012–2013	Šibenik	22	(0)
2013–2014	Cibalia	27	(0)
2014–2015	Vitez	7	(0)
2015–2016	Osijek	29	(0)
2016–2017	Cibalia	25	(0)
2017–2019	Istra 1961	31	(0)
2020	Cibalia	3	(0)
2020–2022	Široki Brijeg	41	(0)
2022–2023	Bedem Ivankovo		
2023	Mladost Cerić		

Managerial career
- 2025–: Cibalia
- * Club domestic league appearances and goals as of 2 July 2022

Tomislav Čuljak (born 25 May 1987) is a Croatian football manager and former professional footballer who played as a defender. He is current manager of Prva NL club Cibalia.

== Club career ==
Born in Vinkovci, Čuljak kicked off his career in 2007 with hometown club Cibalia and in the early years of his career, he represented Cibalia and Zadar. In September 2014, he headed abroad for the first time and signed with Bosnian Premier League club Vitez where he joined fellow Croatian compatriot Toni Pezo.

After being released by Vitez, Čuljak returned to Croatia and signed with Osijek on a six-month contract in January 2015. In the next month, he made his debut against Dinamo Zagreb in a 1–1 draw. In 2016, Čuljak returned to Cibalia and received a red card in a league match in December against Hajduk Split.

In August 2017, Čuljak left Cibalia and moved to Istra 1961, signing a one-year deal. In February 2020, he again came back to Cibalia, but shortly after, signed a one-year contract with Bosnian Premier League club Široki Brijeg on 13 July 2020. Čuljak made his official debut for Široki Brijeg on 2 August 2020 in a league game against Tuzla City.
