= Andrej Lukić =

Croatian footballer

Personal information
- Date of birth: 2 April 1994 (age 32)
- Place of birth: Nova Gradiška, Croatia
- Height: 1.90 m (6 ft 3 in)
- Position: Centre-back

Team information
- Current team: Ruch Chorzów
- Number: 17

Youth career
- 2005–2008: Batrina
- 2008–2009: Marsonia
- 2009–2012: Osijek

Senior career*
Years	Team	Apps	(Gls)
2012–2018	Osijek	102	(5)
2014	→ Cibalia (loan)	12	(2)
2018–2021	Braga	2	(0)
2018	→ Braga B	2	(0)
2018–2019	→ Apollon Smyrnis (loan)	12	(0)
2019	→ Emmen (loan)	7	(0)
2019–2020	→ Sheriff Tiraspol (loan)	26	(4)
2021–2022	Hrvatski Dragovoljac	13	(1)
2022–2024	Mezőkövesd	61	(2)
2024–	Ruch Chorzów	48	(0)
- * Club domestic league appearances and goals as of 14:50, 29 May 2026 (UTC)

Andrej Lukić (Croatian pronunciation: [ǎndrej lǔːkitɕ]; born 2 April 1994) is a Croatian professional footballer who plays as a centre-back for Polish club Ruch Chorzów.

== Club career ==
Lukić made his Croatian First Football League debut for Osijek on 20 October 2012 in a game against Zadar.

On 21 August 2018, he joined Apollon Smyrnis on a season-long loan from Braga.

On 1 August 2019, he joined Moldovan club Sheriff Tiraspol on loan.

On 19 January 2022, Lukić moved to Mezőkövesd in Hungary.

After two years in Hungary, on 1 July 2024, Lukić joined Polish second tier club Ruch Chorzów on a two-year contract.

== Honours ==
Sheriff Tiraspol

- Moldovan Super Liga: 2019
