= Mile Škorić =

Croatian footballer (born 1991)

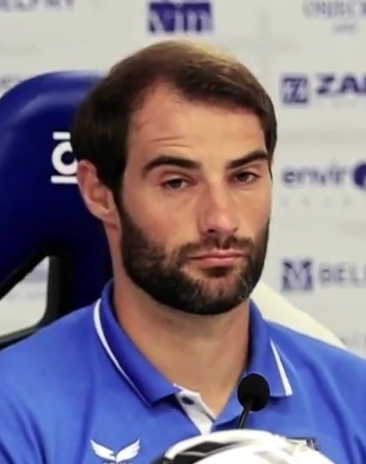
- Škorić with Osijek in 2022

Personal information
- Date of birth: 19 June 1991 (age 35)
- Place of birth: Vinkovci, SR Croatia, Yugoslavia
- Height: 1.87 m (6 ft 1 1/2 in)
- Position: Defender

Team information
- Current team: Rijeka
- Number: 5

Youth career
- 1996-: Sloga Novi Mikanovci
- -2002: Mladost Vođinci
- 2003–2006: Cibalia Vinkovci
- 2006–2010: Osijek

Senior career*
Years	Team	Apps	(Gls)
2008–2011	Osijek	27	(1)
2011	Gorica	11	(0)
2012–2013	HAŠK	37	(7)
2013–2023	Osijek	262	(15)
2023	Cangzhou Mighty Lions	21	(2)
2024	Tianjin Jinmen Tiger	28	(1)
2025–	Rijeka	3	(0)

International career
2013	Croatia U18	7	(0)
2017–2022	Croatia	7	(0)
- * Club domestic league appearances and goals as of 9 February 2025 (UTC)

Mile Škorić (born 19 June 1991) is a Croatian professional footballer who plays as a centre-back for Croatian Football League club Rijeka.

== Club career ==
Škorić started his career playing at youth level for the local club in his village Novi Mikanovci, as a goalkeeper, then moving to NK Mladost Vođinci where he was moved to the centre-back position, before joining the HNK Cibalia Vinkovci academy. At the age of 15 he moved on to Osijek with whom he had signed a scholarship contract in February 2010. He made his debut for the first team as a late substitute in a 1–1 draw against Zadar on 22 March 2008 in the 25th round of 2007–08 season. He scored his first goal in Prva HNL in a 5–1 away win against Rijeka on 23 October 2010. In 2011, he left Osijek and spent half a season with Gorica in Druga HNL, before moving to HAŠK in the same division. Škorić moved back to Osijek prior to the commencement of the 2013–14 season. Škorić played an array of midfield, side-line and offensive positions in top-tier football before settling as a central defender in 2017. His appearance and then oft misunderstood positional and passing creativity earned him the nickname "Zidane iz Novih Mikanovaca" (Zidane from Novi Mikanovci).

In March 2023, after almost ten seasons with Osijek, he signed for Chinese Super League club Cangzhou Mighty Lions on a two-year contract with the option for a third. In October 2023, however, he had his contract with the Chinese club terminated due to unpaid wages and became a free agent.

On 30 January 2024, Škorić joined Chinese Super League club Tianjin Jinmen Tiger.

== International career ==
Škorić was first called up for the Croatia squad on 28 May 2017 for a friendly match against Mexico. He acquired his first competitive cap on 8 June 2019 against Wales in a UEFA Euro 2020 qualifier.

He gained significant prominence when he drove himself from Osijek to Split (an approximate six-hour drive) to defend against Cristiano Ronaldo in a UEFA Nations League match against Portugal. Days before the match on 17 November 2020, manager Zlatko Dalic lost all of his central defenders to injuries and COVID. He called up Škorić, who was originally on the preliminary squad, two days before the match. He earned acclaim for his performance in the match and managed to keep Ronaldo scoreless, however, Portugal eventually won the game 3–2 with a 90th-minute goal.

He was a part of the squad for the postponed Euro 2020 tournament, but did not make a single appearance during the tournament.

== Career statistics ==
As of match played 2 November 2024

Appearances and goals by club, season and competition
Season	Club	League	League		Cup		Europe		Total	
Season	Club	League	Apps	Goals	Apps	Goals	Apps	Goals	Apps	Goals
Osijek	2007–08	1. HNL	1	0	—		—		1	0
Osijek	2008–09	1. HNL	9	0	1	0	—		10	0
Osijek	2009–10	1. HNL	12	0	1	0	—		13	0
Osijek	2010–11	1. HNL	5	1	1	0	—		6	1
Osijek	Total		27	1	3	0	—		30	1
Gorica	2011–12	2. HNL	11	0	—		—		11	0
HAŠK	2011–12	2. HNL	12	1	—		—		12	1
HAŠK	2012–13	2. HNL	25	6	—		—		25	6
HAŠK	Total		37	7	—		—		37	7
Osijek	2013–14	1. HNL	23	3	1	0	—		24	3
Osijek	2014–15	1. HNL	31	4	1	0	—		32	4
Osijek	2015–16	1. HNL	23	2	3	0	—		26	2
Osijek	2016–17	1. HNL	22	0	3	0	—		25	0
Osijek	2017–18	1. HNL	31	1	3	0	8	0	42	1
Osijek	2018–19	1. HNL	34	3	3	0	3	0	40	3
Osijek	2019–20	1. HNL	31	1	4	1	2	0	37	2
Osijek	2020–21	1. HNL	30	1	3	1	1	0	34	2
Osijek	2021–22	1. HNL	26	0	0	0	4	1	30	1
Osijek	2022–23	1. HNL	11	0	1	0	2	0	14	0
Osijek	Total		262	15	22	2	20	1	304	18
Cangzhou Mighty Lions	2023	Chinese Super League	21	2	0	0	—		21	2
Tianjin Jinmen Tiger	2024	Chinese Super League	28	1	2	0	—		30	1
Career total			376	26	27	2	20	1	423	29

== Honours ==
Rijeka

- Croatian Football League: 2024–25
- Croatian Football Cup: 2024–25
