= Nikola Matas =

Croatian footballer (born 1987)

Personal information
- Date of birth: 22 June 1987 (age 39)
- Place of birth: Sinj, SFR Yugoslavia
- Height: 1.85 m (6 ft 1 in)
- Position: Right back

Youth career
- 200?–2005: Junak Sinj
- 2005: Zagreb
- 2006: Junak Sinj

Senior career*
Years	Team	Apps	(Gls)
2006–2007	Junak Sinj		
2007–2009	Trogir	30	(0)
2009–2010	Junak Sinj	15	(0)
2010	Hrvace	14	(4)
2011	Uskok	11	(3)
2012	Hrvace	20	(2)
2012–2013	Junak Sinj	23	(2)
2013	Lokomotiva	7	(0)
2014–2018	Osijek	108	(1)
2018	→ Istra 1961 (loan)	13	(1)
2018–2019	Nafta 1903	9	(0)
2019–2020	Dugopolje		
2020	HNK Val		

International career
2017	Croatia	2	(0)
- * Club domestic league appearances and goals as of 22:41, 1 June 2019 (UTC)

Nikola Matas (Croatian pronunciation: [nǐkola mâtas]; born 22 June 1987) is a Croatian football defender.

== Club career ==
Nikola Matas went up through the ranks of his hometown's NK Junak Sinj academy, spending half a season in NK Zagreb, aged 18. He returned, however to Junak for his first senior season. He joined the newly promoted Druga HNL team, featuring in both their seasons at that rank, before returning to his home team, for another season in Croatia's second tier. Leaving the club again in the summer of 2010, he went on to spend 2 seasons in the Treća HNL Jug, playing for nearby NK Hrvace and NK Uskok.

This was followed by yet another return to Junak and the Druga HNL. Despite the club's relegation at the end of the season, his performances drew interest from Prva HNL sides, and he signed a 4-year contract with NK Lokomotiva.

He started off as the first choice at the right back position there, after the departure of Ivan Boras and the injury of Toni Gorupec. After the first seven rounds, however, he faded from the team and left the club at the winter break.

== International career ==
Matas made his debut for Croatia in a January 2017 China Cup match against Chile and earned a total of 2 caps, scoring no goals. His second and final international was during the same tournament against China.
