= Muzafer Ejupi =

Macedonian footballer

Personal information
- Date of birth: 16 September 1988 (age 38)
- Place of birth: Skopje, SR Macedonia, SFR Yugoslavia
- Height: 1.86 m (6 ft 1 in)
- Position: Forward

Youth career
- 2000–2006: Vardar

Senior career*
Years	Team	Apps	(Gls)
2006–2010	Vardar	48	(8)
2010–2011	Metalurg	38	(7)
2012	Kartalspor	0	(0)
2012–2013	Shkëndija	32	(19)
2013–2014	Turnovo	28	(15)
2014	Songkhla United	13	(5)
2015–2016	Slaven Belupo	49	(21)
2016–2019	Osijek	62	(18)
2019	Slaven Belupo	13	(1)

International career^{‡}
2008–2010	Macedonia U21	5	(0)
2012–2017	Macedonia	2	(0)
- * Club domestic league appearances and goals as of 3 November 2019 ‡ National team caps and goals as of 28 March 2017

Muzafer Ejupi (Macedonian: Музафер Ејупи; born 16 September 1988) is a retired Macedonian footballer. He last played in Croatia for Slaven Belupo.

== Club career ==
Ejupi started his career at FK Vardar, where he remained until 2010 when he joined Metalurg Skopje.

At the beginning of 2012 he moved to Turkey, joining Kartalspor, but left in May of the same year, not earning a single cap for the team.

That summer Ejupi joined FK Shkëndija, and proved to be in good scoring form, ending up as the number two scorer of the Macedonian First Football League, second only to Jovan Kostovski. He remained in form the following season, scoring 15 goals, trailing only behind Dejan Blaževski with 19 and Borče Manevski with 17.

In the summer of 2014 he moved abroad again, joining the Thai team Songkhla United for a half-year spell.

At the end of the year Ejupi joined Croatian First Football League club NK Slaven Belupo, where he became team's top scorer in the season 2015–16. After the successful season, he decided to move to NK Osijek. Ejupi enjoys another fruitful season, leading the scorers list after 24 rounds of the 2016-17 Croatian First Football League.

On 11 June 2019, Ejupi returned to the Slaven Belupo. He signed one-year contract with an option for one more year.

In December 2019, a statement was released by Ejupi on the Slaven Belupo website which announced his retirement. The player stated that he was "tired physically and mentally".

== International career ==
He made his senior debut for Macedonia in a December 2012 match against Poland and has earned a total of 2 caps, scoring no goals. His second and final international was a March 2017 friendly match against Belarus.

== Personal life ==
On 25 September 2019, Ejupi was brought to a local police station following a brawl in Koprivnica. It was subsequently reported by the Croatian media that he was the victim of an assault.
