= 2011–12 NK Osijek season =

Osijek
2011–12 season
- Chairman: Robert Špehar (until 22 November 2011); Zdravko Josić (from 26 March 2012)
- Manager: Vlado Bilić (until 31 March 2012); Stanko Mršić (from 31 March 2012)
- Prva HNL: 8th
- Croatian Cup: Runners-up
- Top goalscorer: League: Antonio Perošević (7); All: Anton Maglica (9)

This article shows statistics of individual players for the Osijek football club. It also lists all matches that Osijek played in the 2011–12 season.

Osijek finished eighth in the final league standings.

== First-team squad ==
As of 26 February 2012

Note: Flags indicate national team as defined under FIFA eligibility rules; some limited exceptions apply. Players may hold more than one non-FIFA nationality.

No.	Pos.	Nation	Player
1	GK	CRO	Zvonimir Mikulić
2	DF	CRO	Branko Vrgoč
3	MF	BIH	Josip Lukačević
4	MF	CRO	Hrvoje Kurtović
5	MF	CRO	Domagoj Pušić
6	DF	CRO	Dino Gavrić
7	MF	CRO	Nikša Petrović
8	MF	CRO	Marko Babić
10	MF	CRO	Antonio Perošević
11	FW	CRO	Anton Maglica
12	GK	CRO	Borna Žitnjak
13	DF	CRO	Marko Lešković
14	MF	CRO	Ivan Aleksić

No.	Pos.	Nation	Player
15	DF	CRO	Ivan Ibriks
16	DF	CRO	Saša Novaković
17	MF	CRO	Vedran Jugović
18	DF	CRO	Marin Glavaš
19	DF	CRO	Hrvoje Bubalo
20	FW	CRO	Josip Barišić
21	MF	BIH	Zoran Kvržić
22	MF	CRO	Tomislav Šorša
23	MF	CRO	Srđan Vidaković
24	DF	CRO	Ivo Smoje
25	GK	CRO	Ivan Vargić
26	FW	CRO	Ivan Miličević
28	DF	CRO	Mislav Leko

== Competitions ==
=== Overall ===
Competition	Started round	Final result	First match	Last Match
2011–12 Prva HNL	–	8th	22 July	12 May
2011–12 Croatian Cup	First round	Runners-up	20 September	9 May

=== Prva HNL ===
==== Classification ====
Pos	Team	Pld	W	D	L	GF	GA	GD	Pts	Qualification or relegation
6	NK Zagreb	30	13	6	11	36	42	−6	45	
7	Lokomotiva	30	12	8	10	33	33	0	44	
8	Osijek	30	11	10	9	45	38	+7	43	Qualification to Europa League first qualifying round (Note: Since 2011–12 Croatian Cup winners Dinamo Zagreb qualified for the 2012–13 UEFA Champions League, so cup runners-up Osijek qualified for the 2012–13 UEFA Europa League first qualifying round. Moreover, Slaven Belupo were moved up a round as the cup winner spot was not used.)
9	Istra 1961	30	11	9	10	35	33	+2	42	
10	Zadar	30	11	7	12	29	44	−15	40	

Source: Sportnet.hr
Rules for classification: 1) points; 2) goal difference; 3) number of goals scored.
For deciding champions, qualification to UEFA Europa League and relegation: 1st points; 2nd head-to-head points; 3rd head-to-head goal difference; 4th head-to-head away goals scored

==== Results summary ====
Overall								Home						Away					
Pld	W	D	L	GF	GA	GD	Pts	W	D	L	GF	GA	GD	W	D	L	GF	GA	GD
30	11	10	9	45	38	+7	43	7	6	2	27	17	+10	4	4	7	18	21	−3

Last updated: 12 May 2012.
Source: Sportnet.hr

==== Results by round ====
Round	1	2	3	4	5	6	7	8	9	10	11	12	13	14	15	16	17	18	19	20	21	22	23	24	25	26	27	28	29	30
Ground	H	A	H	A	H	A	H	A	H	H	A	H	A	H	A	A	H	A	H	A	H	A	H	A	A	H	A	H	A	H
Result	D	W	W	D	L	W	W	L	W	D	L	D	W	D	L	L	W	D	W	L	L	L	D	L	D	W	W	D	D	W
Position	8	3	2	4	7	6	3	6	4	4	6	6	6	5	5	7	5	8	5	6	8	8	9	12	11	10	9	8	9	8

Updated to match(es) played on 12 May 2012. Source: Competitive matches
A = Away; H = Home; W = Win; D = Draw; L = Loss
Notes: Round 18 was played between rounds 22 and 23, on 20–21 March 2012

== Matches ==
=== Pre-season ===
Match	Date	Venue	Opponent	Score	Attendance	Osijek Scorers	Report
1	22 Jun	H	Pécsi MFC (Hungary)	3 – 1	500	Prijić (2), Miličević	Sportnet.hr
2	2 Jul	A (Bosnia and Herzegovina)	Travnik (Bosnia and Herzegovina)	1 – 1	250	Prijić	Sportnet.hr
3	5 Jul	N (Bosnia and Herzegovina)	Zrinjski Mostar (Bosnia and Herzegovina)	1 – 2	250	Ljubojević	Sportnet.hr
4	15 Jul	H	Spartak Zlatibor Voda (Serbia)	2 – 0	500	Babić, Miličević	Sportnet.hr

=== Prva HNL ===
Round	Date	Venue	Opponent	Score	Attendance	Osijek Scorers	Report
1	22 Jul	H	Rijeka	1 – 1	2,000	Ljubojević	Sportnet.hr
2	30 Jul	A	Istra 1961	1 – 0	2,500	Miličević	Sportnet.hr
3	6 Aug	H	NK Zagreb	4 – 0	1,500	Špehar, Oršulić (o.g.), Smoje, Miličević	Sportnet.hr
4	14 Aug	A	RNK Split	2 – 2	500	Vidaković, Babić	Sportnet.hr
5	20 Aug	H	Dinamo Zagreb	0 – 4	6,000		Sportnet.hr
6	27 Aug	A	Cibalia	1 – 0	2,500	Vidaković	Sportnet.hr
7	10 Sep	H	Slaven Belupo	2 – 0	1,000	Vidaković, Šorša	Sportnet.hr
8	18 Sep	A	Karlovac	0 – 2	1,000		Sportnet.hr
9	24 Sep	H	Inter Zaprešić	1 – 0	1,500	Prijić	Sportnet.hr
10	1 Oct	H	Lučko	2 – 2	1,500	Babić, Šorša	Sportnet.hr
11	15 Oct	A	Hajduk Split	1 – 3	8,000	Ljubojević	Sportnet.hr
12	22 Oct	H	Varaždin	2 – 2	500	Ljubojević, Babić	Sportnet.hr
13	28 Oct	A	Lokomotiva	4 – 1	500	Ljubojević (2), Maglica (2)	Sportnet.hr
14	6 Nov	H	Šibenik	0 – 0	1,200		Sportnet.hr
15	19 Nov	A	Zadar	1 – 2	700	Maglica	Sportnet.hr
16	26 Nov	A	Rijeka	0 – 1	1,000		Sportnet.hr
17	4 Dec	H	Istra 1961	2 – 1	1,000	Dino Gavrić, Barišić	Sportnet.hr
19	26 Feb	H	RNK Split	3 – 2	2,000	Maglica (2), Jelić (o.g.)	Sportnet.hr
20	3 Mar	A	Dinamo Zagreb	0 – 1	1,000		Sportnet.hr
21	11 Mar	H	Cibalia	1 – 2	2,500	Perošević	Sportnet.hr
22	16 Mar	A	Slaven Belupo	0 – 2	1,500		Sportnet.hr
18	20 Mar	A	NK Zagreb	2 – 2	800	Perošević, Lešković	Sportnet.hr
23	24 Mar	H	Karlovac	1 – 1	1,500	Perošević	Sportnet.hr
24	30 Mar	A	Inter Zaprešić	0 – 2	500		Sportnet.hr
25	6 Apr	A	Lučko	2 – 2	300	Perošević (2)	Sportnet.hr
26	14 Apr	H	Hajduk Split	2 – 1	3,500	Perošević, Šorša	Sportnet.hr
27	21 Apr	A	Varaždin	3 – 0^{†}	–	–	–
28	28 Apr	H	Lokomotiva	1 – 1	1,500	Smoje	Sportnet.hr
29	5 May	A	Šibenik	1 – 1	300	Perošević	Sportnet.hr
30	12 May	H	Zadar	5 – 0	1,000	Pušić, Šorša, Lukačević, Maglica, Petrović	Sportnet.hr

^{†} Varaždin was expelled so the match was awarded as a 3–0 forfeit win to Osijek

=== Croatian Cup ===
Round	Date	Venue	Opponent	Score	Attendance	Osijek Scorers	Report
R1	20 Sep	A	Opatija	1 – 0	500	Vidaković	Sportnet.hr
R2	25 Oct	H	Radnik Sesvete	2 – 1	500	Ljubojević, Zahora	Sportnet.hr
QF	23 Nov	A	Rijeka	2 – 1	1,000	Kvržić (2)	Sportnet.hr
QF	30 Nov	H	Rijeka	2 – 0	600	Kvržić, Maglica	Sportnet.hr
SF	3 Apr	H	Cibalia	3 – 0	4,000	Maglica (2), Vrgoč	Sportnet.hr
SF	18 Apr	A	Cibalia	1 – 2	3,000	Šorša	Sportnet.hr
Final	2 May	H	Dinamo Zagreb	0 – 0	8,000		Sportnet.hr
Final	9 May	A	Dinamo Zagreb	1 – 3	10,000	Vrsaljko (o.g.)	Sportnet.hr

== Player seasonal records ==
Competitive matches only. Updated to games played 12 May 2012.

=== Goalscorers ===
Rank	Name	League	Cup	Total
1	(Croatia) Anton Maglica	6	3	9
2	(Croatia) Antonio Perošević	7	–	7
3	(Croatia) Goran Ljubojević	5	1	6
4	(Croatia) Tomislav Šorša	4	1	5
5	(Croatia) Srđan Vidaković	3	1	4
6	(Croatia) Marko Babić	3	–	3
6	(Bosnia and Herzegovina) Zoran Kvržić	–	3	3
8	(Croatia) Ivan Miličević	2	–	2
8	(Croatia) Ivo Smoje	2	–	2
10	(Croatia) Josip Barišić	1	–	1
10	(Croatia) Dino Gavrić	1	–	1
10	(Croatia) Marko Lešković	1	–	1
10	(Bosnia and Herzegovina) Josip Lukačević	1	–	1
10	(Croatia) Nikša Petrović	1	–	1
10	(Croatia) Igor Prijić	1	–	1
10	(Croatia) Domagoj Pušić	1	–	1
10	(Croatia) Dino Špehar	1	–	1
10	(Croatia) Branko Vrgoč	–	1	1
10	(Croatia) Dario Zahora	–	1	1
	Own goals	2	1	3
	TOTALS	42	12	54

Source: Competitive matches

=== Disciplinary record ===
Includes all competitive matches. Players with 1 card or more included only.

Number	Position	Name	1. HNL		Croatian Cup		Total	
Number	Position	Name	Booked	Sent off (straight red)	Booked	Sent off (straight red)	Booked	Sent off (straight red)
2	DF	(Croatia) Branko Vrgoč	7	1	1	0	8	1
3	MF	(Bosnia and Herzegovina) Josip Lukačević	3	1	0	0	3	1
4	DF	(Croatia) Hrvoje Kurtović	1	0	0	0	1	0
5	MF	(Croatia) Domagoj Pušić	1	0	0	0	1	0
6	DF	(Croatia) Dino Gavrić	4	1	1	0	5	1
7	FW	(Croatia) Igor Prijić	1	0	1	0	2	0
8	MF	(Croatia) Marko Babić	3	0	0	0	3	0
10	MF	(Croatia) Antonio Perošević	2	0	0	0	2	0
10	MF	(Croatia) Dino Špehar	1	0	0	0	1	0
11	FW	(Croatia) Anton Maglica	4	0	1	0	5	0
12	GK	(Croatia) Ivan Kardum	1	0	0	0	1	0
13	MF	(Croatia) Marko Lešković	3	0	1	0	4	0
15	DF	(Croatia) Ivan Ibriks	4	1	2	0	6	1
17	MF	(Croatia) Vedran Jugović	2	0	2	0	4	0
21	MF	(Bosnia and Herzegovina) Zoran Kvržić	7	1	2	0	9	1
22	MF	(Croatia) Tomislav Šorša	2	0	0	0	2	0
23	MF	(Croatia) Srđan Vidaković	1	0	0	0	1	0
24	DF	(Croatia) Ivo Smoje	5	0	1	0	6	0
26	FW	(Croatia) Ivan Miličević	1	1	1	0	2	1
		TOTALS	52	6	13	0	65	6

Source: Prva-HNL.hr

=== Appearances and goals ===
Number	Position	Player	Apps	Goals	Apps	Goals	Apps	Goals
Number	Position	Player	Total		1. HNL		Croatian Cup	
2	DF	(Croatia) Branko Vrgoč	32	1	20+5	0	7+0	1
3	MF	(Bosnia and Herzegovina) Josip Lukačević	29	1	22+2	1	4+1	0
4	MF	(Croatia) Hrvoje Kurtović	14	0	10+0	0	4+0	0
5	DF	(Croatia) Domagoj Pušić	17	1	3+8	1	0+6	0
6	DF	(Croatia) Dino Gavrić	24	1	21+0	1	3+0	0
7	MF	(Croatia) Mihael Pongračić	3	0	0+2	0	0+1	0
7	FW	(Croatia) Igor Prijić	15	1	1+11	1	1+2	0
8	MF	(Croatia) Marko Babić	22	3	18+0	3	4+0	0
9	FW	(Croatia) Goran Ljubojević	19	6	12+2	5	3+1	1
10	MF	(Croatia) Antonio Perošević	15	7	9+3	7	3+0	0
10	MF	(Croatia) Dino Špehar	5	1	5+0	1	0+0	0
11	FW	(Croatia) Anton Maglica	30	9	13+10	6	5+2	3
11	FW	(Croatia) Dario Zahora	2	1	0+1	0	0+1	1
12	GK	(Croatia) Ivan Kardum	21	0	17+0	0	4+0	0
13	MF	(Croatia) Marko Lešković	25	1	8+11	1	4+2	0
14	MF	(Croatia) Ivan Aleksić	5	0	3+2	0	0+0	0
15	DF	(Croatia) Ivan Ibriks	30	0	20+2	0	8+0	0
16	DF	(Croatia) Saša Novaković	1	0	0+1	0	0+0	0
17	MF	(Croatia) Vedran Jugović	19	0	13+0	0	6+0	0
18	MF	(Croatia) Marin Glavaš	3	0	0+3	0	0+0	0
20	MF	(Croatia) Nikša Petrović	5	1	2+1	1	0+2	0
20	FW	(Croatia) Josip Barišić	14	1	3+8	1	0+3	0
21	MF	(Bosnia and Herzegovina) Zoran Kvržić	32	3	23+1	0	7+1	3
22	MF	(Croatia) Tomislav Šorša	37	5	28+1	4	8+0	1
23	MF	(Croatia) Srđan Vidaković	10	4	9+0	3	1+0	1
24	DF	(Croatia) Ivo Smoje	32	2	24+0	2	8+0	0
25	GK	(Croatia) Ivan Vargić	15	0	11+0	0	4+0	0
26	FW	(Croatia) Ivan Miličević	31	2	18+7	2	3+3	0
28	DF	(Croatia) Mislav Leko	5	0	3+1	0	1+0	0
N/A	GK	(Croatia) Zvonimir Mikulić	1	0	1+0	0	0+0	0

Source: Prva-HNL.hr
