= 2010–11 NK Osijek season =

Osijek
2010–11 season
- Chairman: Robert Špehar
- Manager: Tomislav Steinbruckner (until 16 August 2010); Branko Karačić (from 16 August 2010 until 2 May 2011); Vlado Bilić (from 9 May 2011)
- Prva HNL: 8th
- Croatian Cup: Quarter-finals
- Top goalscorer: League: Ivan Miličević (5); All: Ivan Miličević (6)
- Highest home attendance: 6,000 v Hajduk Split, 1 August 2010
- Lowest home attendance: 300 v Dinamo Zagreb, 9 December 2010
Home colours	Away colours

This article shows statistics of individual players for the Osijek football club. It also lists all matches that Osijek played in the 2010–11 season.

Osijek finished eighth in the final league standings.

== First-team squad ==
As of 2 March 2011

Note: Flags indicate national team as defined under FIFA eligibility rules; some limited exceptions apply. Players may hold more than one non-FIFA nationality.

No.	Pos.	Nation	Player
1	GK	CRO	Zvonimir Mikulić
2	DF	CRO	Branko Vrgoč
3	MF	BIH	Josip Lukačević
4	MF	CRO	Hrvoje Kurtović
5	MF	CRO	Domagoj Pušić
6	DF	CRO	Dino Gavrić
7	FW	CRO	Igor Prijić
8	MF	BIH	Zoran Kvržić
9	FW	CRO	Goran Ljubojević
10	FW	CRO	Dino Špehar
11	DF	CRO	Mladen Pelaić
12	GK	CRO	Ivan Kardum
13	DF	CRO	Marko Lešković

No.	Pos.	Nation	Player
14	DF	CRO	Andrej Čaušić
15	DF	CRO	Ivan Ibriks
16	FW	CRO	Anton Maglica
17	MF	CRO	Vedran Jugović
18	MF	CRO	Milan Pavličić
19	DF	CRO	Hrvoje Bubalo
20	FW	CRO	Josip Barišić
22	MF	CRO	Tomislav Šorša
23	MF	CRO	Srđan Vidaković
24	DF	CRO	Ivo Smoje
25	GK	CRO	Ivan Vargić
26	FW	CRO	Ivan Miličević
28	MF	CRO	Marko Babić

== Competitions ==
=== Overall ===
Competition	Started round	Final result	First match	Last Match
2010–11 Prva HNL	–	8th	25 July	21 May
2010–11 Croatian Cup	First round	Quarter-finals	22 September	9 December

=== Prva HNL ===
==== Classification ====
Pos	Team	Pld	W	D	L	GF	GA	GD	Pts
6	Karlovac	30	11	8	11	25	27	−2	41
7	Slaven Belupo	30	10	10	10	34	30	+4	40
8	Osijek	30	9	12	9	31	29	+2	39
9	Rijeka	30	9	12	9	29	35	−6	39
10	Zadar	30	11	5	14	31	34	−3	38

Source: Prva-HNL.hr
Rules for classification: 1) points; 2) goal difference; 3) number of goals scored.
For deciding champions, qualification to UEFA Europa League and relegation: 1st points; 2nd head-to-head points; 3rd head-to-head goal difference; 4th head-to-head away goals scored

== Results summary ==
Overall								Home						Away					
Pld	W	D	L	GF	GA	GD	Pts	W	D	L	GF	GA	GD	W	D	L	GF	GA	GD
30	9	12	9	31	29	+2	39	6	8	1	15	10	+5	3	4	8	16	19	−3

Last updated: 21 May 2011.
Source: Sportnet.hr

=== Results by round ===
Round	1	2	3	4	5	6	7	8	9	10	11	12	13	14	15	16	17	18	19	20	21	22	23	24	25	26	27	28	29	30
Ground	A	H	A	H	A	A	H	A	H	A	H	A	H	A	H	H	A	H	A	H	H	A	H	A	H	A	H	A	H	A
Result	L	D	D	D	W	D	W	L	W	L	L	W	D	L	D	W	L	D	D	W	D	L	W	D	W	L	D	W	D	L
Position	15	13	12	12	11	10	10	11	9	10	11	9	8	11	12	10	11	11	11	8	10	10	7	8	6	8	9	7	7	8

Source: Competitive matches
A = Away; H = Home; W = Win; D = Draw; L = Loss

=== Results by opponent ===
Team	Results		Points
Team	Home	Away	Points
Cibalia	1–0	0–3	3
Dinamo Zagreb	1–3	0–1	0
Hajduk Split	2–2	1–2	1
Hrvatski Dragovoljac	0–0	1–1	2
Inter Zaprešić	1–0	0–1	3
Istra 1961	2–1	2–1	6
Karlovac	0–0	0–1	1
Lokomotiva	0–0	0–0	2
Rijeka	0–0	5–1	4
Slaven Belupo	1–1	1–2	1
RNK Split	1–0	0–1	3
Šibenik	3–1	1–2	3
Varaždin	0–0	4–2	4
Zadar	3–2	1–1	4
NK Zagreb	0–0	0–0	2

Source: 2010–11 Prva HNL article

== Matches ==
=== Pre-season ===
Match	Date	Venue	Opponent	Score	Osijek Scorers	Report
1	20 Jun	A	Torpedo Kuševac	0 – 1		Sportnet.hr
2	26 Jun	A (Bosnia and Herzegovina)	Posavina 108 (Bosnia and Herzegovina)	4 – 1	Jugović, Vehabović, Lepinjica, Maglica	SPORTplus.hr
3	2 Jul	H	Ferencváros (Hungary)	2 – 0	Maglica, Lepinjica	Sportnet.hr
4	6 Jul	A (Austria)	WAC St. Andrä (Austria)	0 – 2		Sportnet.hr
5	8 Jul	N (Austria)	Universitatea Craiova (Romania)	2 – 0	Smoje, Maglica	Sportnet.hr
6	10 Jul	N (Slovenia)	Hrvatski Dragovoljac	4 – 1	Prijić (3), I. Plum	Sportnet.hr
7	11 Jul	N (Austria)	Astra Ploieşti (Romania)	0 – 0		Sportnet.hr
8	18 Jul	H	Olimpija Osijek	6 – 1	Prijić (2), Pelaić, Barišić, Lukačević, Vidaković	Sportnet.hr

=== Prva HNL ===
Round	Date	Venue	Opponent	Score	Attendance	Osijek Scorers	Report
1	25 Jul	A	Cibalia	0 – 3	2,000		Sportnet.hr
2	1 Aug	H	Hajduk Split	2 – 2	6,000	Vidaković, Miličević	Sportnet.hr
3	6 Aug	A	Zagreb	0 – 0	2,000		Sportnet.hr
4	14 Aug	H	Lokomotiva	0 – 0	1,500		Sportnet.hr
5	21 Aug	A	Istra 1961	2 – 1	1,000	Pušić, Kvržić	Sportnet.hr
6	27 Aug	A	Hrvatski Dragovoljac	1 – 1	300	Barišić	Sportnet.hr
7	10 Sep	H	Šibenik	3 – 1	1,000	Kvržić, Barišić, Smoje	Sportnet.hr
8	17 Sep	A	Inter Zaprešić	0 – 1	400		Sportnet.hr
9	25 Sep	H	Zadar	3 – 2	1,000	Jugović, Miličević, Nikšić	Sportnet.hr
10	2 Oct	A	RNK Split	0 – 1	1,800		Sportnet.hr
11	16 Oct	H	Dinamo Zagreb	1 – 3	5,000	Nikšić	Sportnet.hr
12	23 Oct	A	Rijeka	5 – 1	1,500	Miličević, Smoje, Nikšić, Šorša, Škorić	Sportnet.hr
13	30 Oct	H	Varaždin	0 – 0	2,500		Sportnet.hr
14	6 Nov	A	Karlovac	0 – 1	1,000		Sportnet.hr
15	13 Nov	H	Slaven Belupo	1 – 1	1,500	Špehar	Sportnet.hr
16	20 Nov	H	Cibalia	1 – 0	2,000	Maglica	Sportnet.hr
17	27 Nov	A	Hajduk Split	1 – 2	3,000	Pavličić	Sportnet.hr
18	4 Dec	H	NK Zagreb	0 – 0	1,000		Sportnet.hr
19	25 Feb	A	Lokomotiva	0 – 0	200		Sportnet.hr
20	5 Mar	H	Istra 1961	2 – 1	2,000	Maglica, Smoje	Sportnet.hr
21	12 Mar	H	Hrvatski Dragovoljac	0 – 0	2,500		Sportnet.hr
22	19 Mar	A	Šibenik	1 – 2	1,000	Ljubojević	Sportnet.hr
23	2 Apr	H	Inter Zaprešić	1 – 0	1,500	Lukačević	Sportnet.hr
24	9 Apr	A	Zadar	1 – 1	1,000	Barišić	Sportnet.hr
25	16 Apr	H	RNK Split	1 – 0	1,500	Vidaković	Sportnet.hr
26	23 Apr	A	Dinamo Zagreb	0 – 1	1,850		Sportnet.hr
27	30 Apr	H	Rijeka	0 – 0	1,500		Sportnet.hr
28	6 May	A	Varaždin	4 – 2	500	Miličević (2), Maglica, Babić	Sportnet.hr
29	14 May	H	Karlovac	0 – 0	1,500		Sportnet.hr
30	21 May	A	Slaven Belupo	1 – 2	1,000	Maglica	Sportnet.hr

=== Croatian Cup ===
Round	Date	Venue	Opponent	Score	Attendance	Osijek Scorers	Report
R1	21 Sep	A	MV Croatia	2 – 1	1,500	Miličević, Jugović	Sportnet.hr
R2	27 Oct	H	Šibenik	2 – 1	2,000	Kvržić, Smoje	Sportnet.hr
QF	23 Nov	A	Dinamo Zagreb	0 – 2	1,000		Sportnet.hr
QF	9 Dec	H	Dinamo Zagreb	1 – 3	300	Špehar	Sportnet.hr

Last updated 6 May 2011
Sources: Prva-HNL.hr, Sportnet.hr

== Player seasonal records ==
Competitive matches only. Updated to games played 21 May 2011.

=== Goalscorers ===
Rank	Name	League	Cup	Total
1	(Croatia) Ivan Miličević	5	1	6
2	(Croatia) Anton Maglica	4	–	4
2	(Croatia) Ivo Smoje	3	1	4
4	(Croatia) Josip Barišić	3	–	3
4	(Bosnia and Herzegovina) Zoran Kvržić	2	1	3
4	(Croatia) Vedran Nikšić	3	–	3
7	(Croatia) Vedran Jugović	1	1	2
7	(Croatia) Dino Špehar	1	1	2
7	(Croatia) Srđan Vidaković	2	–	2
10	(Croatia) Marko Babić	1	–	1
10	(Bosnia and Herzegovina) Josip Lukačević	1	–	1
10	(Croatia) Goran Ljubojević	1	–	1
10	(Croatia) Milan Pavličić	1	–	1
10	(Croatia) Domagoj Pušić	1	–	1
10	(Croatia) Mile Škorić	1	–	1
10	(Croatia) Tomislav Šorša	1	–	1
	TOTALS	31	5	36

Source: Competitive matches

=== Disciplinary record ===
Includes all competitive matches. Players with 1 card or more included only.

Number	Position	Name	1. HNL		Croatian Cup		Total	
Number	Position	Name	Booked	Sent off (straight red)	Booked	Sent off (straight red)	Booked	Sent off (straight red)
2	DF	(Croatia) Branko Vrgoč	2	0	0	0	2	0
3	MF	(Bosnia and Herzegovina) Josip Lukačević	2	0	0	0	2	0
4	MF	(Croatia) Hrvoje Kurtović	5	0	2	0	7	0
5	MF	(Croatia) Domagoj Pušić	3	0	0	0	3	0
6	DF	(Croatia) Dino Gavrić	9	1	2	1	11	2
8	MF	(Bosnia and Herzegovina) Zoran Kvržić	5	0	0	0	5	0
11	DF	(Croatia) Mladen Pelaić	7	1	0	0	7	1
12	GK	(Croatia) Ivan Kardum	2	0	0	0	2	0
14	DF	(Croatia) Andrej Čaušić	1	0	0	0	1	0
15	DF	(Croatia) Ivan Ibriks	1	0	0	0	1	0
16	FW	(Croatia) Anton Maglica	3	0	0	0	3	0
17	MF	(Croatia) Vedran Jugović	2	0	0	0	2	0
18	MF	(Croatia) Milan Pavličić	1	0	0	0	1	0
19	DF	(Croatia) Hrvoje Bubalo	1	0	1	0	2	0
20	FW	(Croatia) Josip Barišić	1	0	0	0	1	0
22	MF	(Croatia) Tomislav Šorša	2	0	0	0	2	0
23	MF	(Croatia) Srđan Vidaković	3	0	1	0	5	0
24	DF	(Croatia) Ivo Smoje	5	0	0	0	5	0
26	FW	(Croatia) Ivan Miličević	1	0	1	0	2	0
N/A	DF	(Croatia) Jurica Pranjić	1	0	0	0	1	0
7	FW	(Croatia) Vedran Nikšić	1	0	0	0	1	0
27	DF	(Bosnia and Herzegovina) Petar Stojkić	2	0	0	0	2	0
		TOTALS	61	2	7	1	68	3

Source: Prva-HNL.hr

=== Appearances and goals ===
Number	Position	Player	Total		1. HNL		Croatian Cup	
Number	Position	Player	Apps	Goals	Apps	Goals	Apps	Goals
2	DF	(Croatia) Branko Vrgoč	11	0	10+1	0	0+0	0
3	MF	(Bosnia and Herzegovina) Josip Lukačević	26	1	20+2	1	4+0	0
4	MF	(Croatia) Hrvoje Kurtović	24	0	15+6	0	3+0	0
5	MF	(Croatia) Domagoj Pušić	18	1	14+0	1	3+1	0
6	DF	(Croatia) Dino Gavrić	29	0	25+1	0	3+0	0
7	FW	(Croatia) Igor Prijić	5	0	1+4	0	0+0	0
8	MF	(Bosnia and Herzegovina) Zoran Kvržić	23	3	13+7	2	2+1	1
9	FW	(Croatia) Goran Ljubojević	11	1	11+0	1	0+0	0
10	FW	(Croatia) Dino Špehar	18	2	13+2	1	2+1	1
11	DF	(Croatia) Mladen Pelaić	15	0	12+2	0	1+0	0
12	GK	(Croatia) Ivan Kardum	34	0	30+0	0	4+0	0
13	DF	(Croatia) Marko Lešković	2	0	0+2	0	0+0	0
14	DF	(Croatia) Andrej Čaušić	12	0	8+1	0	3+0	0
15	DF	(Croatia) Ivan Ibriks	12	0	10+1	0	1+0	0
16	FW	(Croatia) Anton Maglica	20	4	8+11	4	1+0	0
17	MF	(Croatia) Vedran Jugović	28	2	25+0	1	3+0	1
18	MF	(Croatia) Milan Pavličić	8	1	2+5	1	1+0	0
19	DF	(Croatia) Hrvoje Bubalo	8	0	6+0	0	0+2	0
20	FW	(Croatia) Josip Barišić	27	3	12+12	3	2+1	0
22	MF	(Croatia) Tomislav Šorša	26	1	24+0	1	2+0	0
23	MF	(Croatia) Srđan Vidaković	28	2	19+6	2	2+1	0
24	DF	(Croatia) Ivo Smoje	19	4	17+0	3	2+0	1
26	FW	(Croatia) Ivan Miličević	30	6	22+4	5	4+0	1
28	MF	(Croatia) Marko Babić	8	1	1+7	1	0+0	0
N/A	MF	(Croatia) Antonio Perošević	2	0	0+1	0	0+1	0
N/A	DF	(Croatia) Jurica Pranjić	3	0	2+0	0	0+1	0
N/A	MF	(Croatia) Mile Škorić	6	1	0+5	1	0+1	0
7	FW	(Croatia) Vedran Nikšić	12	3	7+4	3	1+0	0
9	FW	(Croatia) Ivan Plum	1	0	0+1	0	0+0	0
27	DF	(Bosnia and Herzegovina) Petar Stojkić	7	0	3+2	0	0+2	0

Source: Prva-HNL.hr

== Transfers ==
=== In ===
Date	Position	Player	From	Fee
8 June 2010	MF	(Bosnia and Herzegovina) Josip Lukačević	Cibalia	Free
16 June 2010	DF	(Croatia) Mladen Pelaić	Hajduk Split	Free
19 June 2010	DF	(Croatia) Ivo Smoje	Hajduk Split	Free
24 June 2010	DF	(Croatia) Hrvoje Bubalo	Međimurje	Free
20 July 2010	MF	(Bosnia and Herzegovina) Zoran Kvržić	HAŠK	Free
7 October 2010	FW	(Croatia) Dino Špehar	Youth system	–
10 February 2011	FW	(Croatia) Goran Ljubojević	AIK	Free
2 March 2011	MF	(Croatia) Marko Babić	–	Free

=== Out ===
Date	Position	Player	To	Fee
17 June 2010	FW	(Croatia) Antonio Hrnčević	Inter Zaprešić	Free
25 September 2010	MF	(North Macedonia) Goran Todorčev	Inter Zaprešić	Free
25 December 2010	DF	(Bosnia and Herzegovina) Petar Stojkić	Zrinjski Mostar	Free
28 January 2011	FW	(Croatia) Vedran Nikšić	Győri ETO	Free
28 January 2011	FW	(Croatia) Ivan Plum	Dinamo Zagreb	€150,000
28 January 2011	MF	(Croatia) Hrvoje Plum	Dinamo Zagreb	€150,000

=== Loans out ===
Date	Position	Player	To	Until
5 September 2010	DF	(Croatia) Saša Novaković	Vukovar '91	5 January 2011
12 January 2011	MF	(Croatia) Toni Kačunić	Crikvenica	End of season
22 January 2011	DF	(Croatia) Saša Novaković	Crikvenica	End of season

Sources: nogometni-magazin.com
