= 2008–09 NK Osijek season =

Osijek
2008–09 season
- Chairman: Mile Dumančić
- Manager: Ilija Lončarević (until 26 September 2008); Tomislav Steinbruckner (from 26 September 2008)
- Prva HNL: 7th
- Croatian Cup: First round
- Top goalscorer: League: Josip Barišić (8); All: Josip Barišić (8)
- Highest home attendance: 15,000 v Hajduk Split, 5 April 2009
- Lowest home attendance: 1,000 v Šibenik, 26 September 2008
Home colours	Away colours

NK Osijek started the 2008-09 Season defending third position, which is equal to their best position in Prva HNL won six times since Croatian independence. The team decided not to participate in the UEFA Intertoto Cup which would make preparations for the new season harder than usual, as happened two years ago.

To prepare for the Season, NK Osijek played a few friendly matches against 1. FC Kaiserslautern and FC Fehérvár to name a few. The new season will start with the same manager as last year, and with just Milan Pavličić sold from last years starting eleven. As the club's youth academy is one of the best in this part of Europe, several young players are drafted into the first team squad.

The club finished the season in seventh place in the league standings.

== Kit ==
Supplier: Legea
Sponsor(s): Croatia Osiguranje

Home	Away

== Player statistics ==
Shirt No.	Player	Apps (Subs)	Goals	YC	RC
1	(Croatia) Marin Skender	6	0	0	0
2	(Croatia) Dino Gavrić	4 (2)	0	2	0
3	(Croatia) Jurica Pranjić	0	0	0	0
4	(Croatia) Damir Vuica	0	0	0	0
5	(Croatia) Matej Vlaović	0	0	0	0
6	(Croatia) Tomislav Višević	5	0	3	0
7	(Croatia) Vedran Nikšić	0	0	0	0
8	(Bosnia and Herzegovina) Aleksandar Šolić	4 (2)	0	0	0
9	(Croatia) Karlo Primorac	6	2	0	0
10	(Croatia) Josip Knežević	2 (3)	1	1	0
11	(Croatia) Antonio Hrnčević	3 (4)	0	1	0
12	(Croatia) Filip Šušnjara	0	0	0	0
13	(Croatia) Slobodan Stranatić	6	0	1	0
14	(Croatia) Ivica Lončarević	0	0	0	0
15	(Croatia) Marko Prskalo	0	0	0	0
16	(North Macedonia) Goran Todorčev	1 (1)	0	1	0
17	(Croatia) Vedran Jugović	5	0	2	0
18	(Croatia) Tomislav Šorša	1	0	0	0
19	(Croatia) Domagoj Vida	6	0	2	0
20	(Paraguay) Diego Barrios	0	0	0	0
21	(Croatia) Igor Prijić	0 (2)	1	1	0
22	(Croatia) Valentin Babić	6	3	3	0
23	(Croatia) Srđan Vidaković	0	0	0	0
24	(Croatia) Ivo Smoje	6	0	2	0
25	(Croatia) Davor Pajić	0	0	0	0
26	(Croatia) Ivan Miličević	3 (3)	2	1	0
27	(Brazil) Andre Luiz	0	0	0	0
28	(Croatia) Domagoj Pušić	0 (1)	0	0	0
29	(Croatia) Josip Barišić	0	0	0	0
30	(Croatia) Ivan Kardum	0	0	0	0
31	(Croatia) Ivan Vargić	0	0	0	0
	(Croatia) Mile Škorić	2 (2)	0	1	0
33	(Croatia) Alen Milošević	7 (3)	5	3	0

== Matches ==
=== Prva HNL ===
27 July 2008 1	Croatia Sesvete	1–1	NK Osijek	Velika
20:00	Petrović 71' (pen.)		Babić 90'	Stadium: Stadion Kamen Ingrad; Attendance: 1,000; Referee: Edi Šunjić

3 August 2008 2	NK Osijek	2–0	HNK Cibalia	Osijek
20:00	Miličević 37'; Babić 80' (pen.)			Stadium: Stadion Gradski vrt Attendance: 3,500; Referee: Bruno Marić

10 August 2008 3	NK Zadar	2–2	NK Osijek	Šibenik
20:00	Smoje 58' (o.g.); Tomasov 70'		Primorac 37'; Babić 51'	Stadium: Stadion Šubićevac; Attendance: 1,000; Referee: Igor Križarić

17 August 2008 4	NK Osijek	2–1	Varteks	Osijek
20:00	Prijić 81'; Miličević 88'		Mujanović 41'	Stadium: Stadion Gradski vrt Attendance: 2,500; Referee: Igor Pristovnik

24 August 2008 5	NK Zagreb	2–1	NK Osijek	Zagreb
20:00	Čutura 71'; Vugrinec 88'		Knežević 53'	Stadium: Stadion Kranjčevićeva; Attendance: 2,500; Referee: Vlado Svilokos

31 August 2008 6	NK Osijek	1–2	Hajduk Split	Osijek
20:00	Primorac 63'		Kalinić 39'; Gabrić 52'	Stadium: Stadion Gradski vrt Attendance: 6,000; Referee: Zlatko Šimičić

== Standings ==
Pos	Team	Pld	W	D	L	GF	GA	GD	Pts
5	NK Zagreb	33	13	8	12	38	39	−1	47
6	Šibenik	33	13	7	13	44	35	+9	46
7	Osijek	33	10	11	12	40	41	−1	41
8	Cibalia	33	10	8	15	33	53	−20	38
9	Inter Zaprešić	33	9	9	15	41	50	−9	36

Source: Sportnet.hr
Rules for classification: 1) points; 2) goal difference; 3) number of goals scored.
