= 2012–13 NK Osijek season =

Osijek
2012–13 season
- Chairman: Zdravko Josić
- Manager: Stanko Mršić (until 13 May 2013); Miroslav Žitnjak (caretaker, from 13 May 2013)
- Prva HNL: 7th
- Croatian Cup: Quarter-finals
- UEFA Europa League: Second qualifying round
- Top goalscorer: League: Zoran Kvržić, Antonio Perošević (4); All: Zoran Kvržić, Ivan Miličević (6)

This article shows statistics of individual players for the Osijek football club. It also lists all matches that Osijek played in the 2012–13 season.

Osijek finished seventh in the final league standings.

== First-team squad ==
As of 1 February 2013

Note: Flags indicate national team as defined under FIFA eligibility rules; some limited exceptions apply. Players may hold more than one non-FIFA nationality.

No.	Pos.	Nation	Player
1	GK	CRO	Zvonimir Mikulić
2	DF	CRO	Branko Vrgoč
3	DF	CRO	Antonio Pavić
4	MF	CRO	Hrvoje Kurtović
5	MF	CRO	Domagoj Pušić
7	MF	CRO	Ivan Jakovljević
8	MF	CRO	Matija Mišić
9	FW	CRO	Marko Dugandžić
10	MF	CRO	Antonio Perošević
11	FW	CRO	Gavro Bagić
12	GK	CRO	Borna Žitnjak
13	MF	CRO	Marko Lešković
14	DF	CRO	Ivan Aleksić
15	DF	CRO	Ivan Ibriks

No.	Pos.	Nation	Player
16	DF	CRO	Saša Novaković
17	FW	CRO	Nikola Mandić
18	DF	CRO	Marin Glavaš
19	FW	CRO	Marin Zulim
20	FW	CRO	Mihael Pongračić
21	MF	BIH	Zoran Kvržić
22	MF	CRO	Tomislav Šorša
23	MF	BIH	Josip Lukačević
24	DF	CRO	Ivo Smoje
27	MF	CRO	Josip Mišić
28	DF	CRO	Mislav Leko
30	GK	CRO	Marko Malenica
—	MF	CRO	Nikša Petrović
—	FW	BIH	Dragan Blatnjak

== Competitions ==
=== Overall ===
Competition	Started round	Final result	First match	Last Match
2012–13 Prva HNL	–	7th	22 July 2012	26 May 213
2012–13 Croatian Cup	First round	Quarter-finals	26 September 2012	27 November 2012
2012–13 UEFA Europa League	QR1	QR2	5 July 2012	26 July 2012

=== Prva HNL ===
Pos	Team	Pld	W	D	L	GF	GA	GD	Pts
5	RNK Split	33	15	7	11	49	37	+12	52
6	Istra 1961	33	11	11	11	35	32	+3	44
7	Osijek	33	9	12	12	25	33	−8	39
8	Slaven Belupo	33	10	9	14	35	50	−15	39
9	Zadar	33	9	9	15	39	61	−22	36

Source: Sportnet.hr
Rules for classification: 1) points; 2) goal difference; 3) number of goals scored.
For deciding champions, qualification to UEFA Europa League and relegation: 1st points; 2nd head-to-head points; 3rd head-to-head goal difference; 4th head-to-head away goals scored

==== Results summary ====
Overall								Home						Away					
Pld	W	D	L	GF	GA	GD	Pts	W	D	L	GF	GA	GD	W	D	L	GF	GA	GD
33	9	12	12	25	33	−8	39	7	5	4	15	15	0	2	7	8	10	18	−8

Last updated: 2 March 2021.
Source: Sportnet.hr

==== Results by round ====
Round	1	2	3	4	5	6	7	8	9	10	11	12	13	14	15	16	17	18	19	20	21	22	23	24	25	26	27	28	29	30	31	32	33
Ground	A	H	A	A	H	A	H	A	H	A	H	H	A	H	H	A	H	A	H	A	H	A	A	A	H	A	H	A	H	A	H	A	H
Result	D	W	D	W	D	D	L	D	W	W	D	W	L	L	D	L	D	L	W	L	D	D	D	D	L	L	W	L	W	L	L	L	W
Position	8	5	6	4	5	4	7	7	6	3	4	3	4	6	7	7	7	7	7	7	7	7	7	7	8	8	7	8	8	8	8	8	7

Updated to match(es) played on 26 May 2013. Source: Competitive matches
A = Away; H = Home; W = Win; D = Draw; L = Loss

== Matches ==
=== Prva HNL ===
Round	Date	Venue	Opponent	Score	Attendance	Osijek Scorers	Report
1	22 Jul	A	Zadar	0 – 0	2,000		Sportnet.hr
2	29 Jul	H	NK Zagreb	1 – 0	600	Kvržić	Sportnet.hr
3	3 Aug	A	Lokomotiva	0 – 0	200		Sportnet.hr
4	10 Aug	A	Inter Zaprešić	3 – 0	500	Perošević (2), J. Mišić	Sportnet.hr
5	18 Aug	H	Rijeka	1 – 1	1,200	Perošević	Sportnet.hr
6	25 Aug	A	Hajduk Split	1 – 1	10,000	Lešković	Sportnet.hr
7	2 Sep	H	Slaven Belupo	1 – 2	2,000	Kvržić	Sportnet.hr
8	14 Sep	A	Dinamo Zagreb	0 – 0	1,300		Sportnet.hr
9	22 Sep	H	Cibalia	1 – 0	2,000	Ibriks	Sportnet.hr
10	29 Sep	A	Istra 1961	3 – 1	1,000	Miličević (2), Lešković	Sportnet.hr
11	6 Oct	H	RNK Split	2 – 2	1,500	Lešković, Miličević	Sportnet.hr
12	20 Oct	H	Zadar	2 – 0	2,000	Pušić, Pongračić	Sportnet.hr
13	26 Oct	A	NK Zagreb	1 – 2	200	Kvržić	Sportnet.hr
14	4 Nov	H	Lokomotiva	1 – 2	1,000	Zubak	Sportnet.hr
15	10 Nov	H	Inter Zaprešić	1 – 1	1,000	Zubak	Sportnet.hr
16	18 Nov	A	Rijeka	1 – 3	3,000	Zubak	Sportnet.hr
17	24 Nov	H	Hajduk Split	0 – 0	5,000		Sportnet.hr
18	1 Dec	A	Slaven Belupo	0 – 2	600		Sportnet.hr
19	10 Feb	H	Dinamo Zagreb	2 – 1	3,000	Vrgoč, Pušić	Sportnet.hr
20	16 Feb	A	Cibalia	0 – 2	1,000		Sportnet.hr
21	23 Feb	H	Istra 1961	0 – 0	1,000		Sportnet.hr
22	2 Mar	A	RNK Split	0 – 0	500		Sportnet.hr
23	10 Mar	A	Dinamo Zagreb	0 – 0	2,500		Sportnet.hr
24	15 Mar	A	Slaven Belupo	0 – 0	650		Sportnet.hr
25	29 Mar	H	Istra 1961	0 – 4	1,000		Sportnet.hr
26	6 Apr	A	Rijeka	0 – 1	6,000		Sportnet.hr
27	13 Apr	H	Zadar	1 – 0	3,000	Kvržić	Sportnet.hr
28	20 Apr	A	RNK Split	1 – 4	600	Perošević	Sportnet.hr
29	27 Apr	H	NK Zagreb	1 – 0	1,500	Lešković	Sportnet.hr
30	4 May	A	Lokomotiva	0 – 1	300		Sportnet.hr
31	11 May	H	Inter Zaprešić	0 – 2	500		Sportnet.hr
32	17 May	A	Hajduk Split	0 – 1	4,000		Sportnet.hr
33	26 May	H	Cibalia	1 – 0	1,000	Perošević	Sportnet.hr

=== Europa League ===
Round	Date	Venue	Opponent	Score	Attendance	Osijek Scorers	Report
QR1	5 Jul	A (Andorra)	FC Santa Coloma (Andorra)	1 – 0	516	Miličević	Sportnet.hr
QR1	12 Jul	H	FC Santa Coloma (Andorra)	3 – 1	1,500	Kvržić, Perošević, Jugović	Sportnet.hr
QR2	19 Jul	H	Kalmar FF (Sweden)	1 – 3	1,800	Miličević	Sportnet.hr
QR2	26 Jul	A (Sweden)	Kalmar FF (Sweden)	0 – 3	5,000		Sportnet.hr

=== Croatian Cup ===
Round	Date	Venue	Opponent	Score	Attendance	Osijek Scorers	Report
R1	26 Sep	A	Novalja	1 – 0	300	Zubak	Sportnet.hr
R2	30 Oct	H	Istra 1961	3 – 2 (a.e.t.)	1,000	Kvržić, Pongračić, Miličević	Sportnet.hr
QF	21 Nov	A	Cibalia	1 – 1	2,000	Lešković	Sportnet.hr
QF	27 Nov	H	Cibalia	1 – 3	4,000	Lešković	Sportnet.hr

Sources: Prva-HNL.hr

== Player seasonal records ==
Competitive matches only. Updated to games played 20 April 2013.

=== Top scorers ===
Rank	Name	League	Europe	Cup	Total
1	(Bosnia and Herzegovina) Zoran Kvržić	4	1	1	6
1	(Croatia) Ivan Miličević	3	2	1	6
3	(Croatia) Antonio Perošević	4	1	–	5
3	(Croatia) Marko Lešković	3	–	2	5
5	(Croatia) Matias Zubak	3	–	1	4
6	(Croatia) Mihael Pongračić	1	–	1	2
6	(Croatia) Domagoj Pušić	2	–	–	2
8	(Croatia) Ivan Ibriks	1	–	–	1
8	(Croatia) Josip Mišić	1	–	–	1
8	(Croatia) Vedran Jugović	–	1	–	1
8	(Croatia) Branko Vrgoč	1	–	–	1
	TOTALS	23	5	6	34

Source: Competitive matches

=== Appearances and goals ===
Number	Position	Player	Apps	Goals	Apps	Goals	Apps	Goals	Apps	Goals
Number	Position	Player	Total		1. HNL		Europa League		Croatian Cup	
1	GK	(Croatia) Zvonimir Mikulić	10	0	10+0	0	0+0	0	0+0	0
2	DF	(Croatia) Branko Vrgoč	28	1	20+0	1	4+0	0	4+0	0
3	DF	(Croatia) Antonio Pavić	7	0	3+3	0	0+1	0	0+0	0
4	MF	(Croatia) Hrvoje Kurtović	27	0	21+0	0	4+0	0	2+0	0
5	MF	(Croatia) Domagoj Pušić	19	2	16+1	2	1+0	0	1+0	0
6	MF	(Croatia) Andrej Lukić	13	0	2+8	0	0+0	0	0+3	0
7	MF	(Croatia) Ivan Jakovljević	5	0	1+4	0	0+0	0	0+0	0
7	FW	(Croatia) Matias Zubak	12	4	4+4	3	0+0	0	3+1	1
8	MF	(Croatia) Matija Mišić	8	0	3+3	0	0+1	0	1+0	0
9	FW	(Bosnia and Herzegovina) Dragan Blatnjak	6	0	6+0	0	0+0	0	0+0	0
9	FW	(Croatia) Marko Dugandžić	7	0	1+4	0	1+1	0	0+0	0
10	MF	(Croatia) Antonio Perošević	23	5	16+1	4	4+0	1	2+0	0
11	FW	(Croatia) Gavro Bagić	6	0	1+5	0	0+0	0	0+0	0
13	MF	(Croatia) Marko Lešković	32	5	24+1	3	3+0	0	4+0	2
14	DF	(Croatia) Ivan Aleksić	21	0	14+2	0	0+1	0	4+0	0
15	DF	(Croatia) Ivan Ibriks	34	1	26+1	1	4+0	0	3+0	0
16	DF	(Croatia) Saša Novaković	21	0	13+4	0	0+1	0	3+0	0
17	FW	(Croatia) Nikola Mandić	3	0	0+3	0	0+0	0	0+0	0
17	MF	(Croatia) Vedran Jugović	17	1	11+0	0	4+0	1	2+0	0
18	DF	(Croatia) Marin Glavaš	17	0	3+12	0	0+0	0	1+1	0
19	FW	(Croatia) Marin Zulim	17	0	8+6	0	0+2	0	0+1	0
20	FW	(Croatia) Mihael Pongračić	27	2	11+12	1	0+1	0	1+2	1
20	MF	(Croatia) Nikša Petrović	4	0	1+0	0	3+0	0	0+0	0
21	MF	(Bosnia and Herzegovina) Zoran Kvržić	34	6	25+1	4	4+0	1	4+0	1
22	MF	(Croatia) Tomislav Šorša	1	0	1+0	0	0+0	0	0+0	0
24	DF	(Croatia) Ivo Smoje	31	0	23+0	0	4+0	0	4+0	0
25	GK	(Croatia) Ivan Vargić	26	0	18+0	0	4+0	0	4+0	0
26	MF	(Croatia) Bruno Krstanović	2	0	0+2	0	0+0	0	0+0	0
26	FW	(Croatia) Ivan Miličević	19	6	11+1	3	3+1	2	1+2	1
27	MF	(Croatia) Josip Mišić	11	1	5+2	1	0+3	0	0+1	0
28	DF	(Croatia) Mislav Leko	12	0	8+2	0	1+0	0	0+1	0
N/A	DF	(Croatia) Andrej Šimunec	1	0	1+0	0	0+0	0	0+0	0
N/A	DF	(Croatia) Josip Tomašević	1	0	1+0	0	0+0	0	0+0	0

Sources: Prva-HNL.hr, UEFA.com
