= 2012 Croatian Football Cup final =

- Event: 2011–12 Croatian Cup
Osijek	Dinamo Zagreb
1	3

First leg
Osijek	Dinamo Zagreb
0	0
- Date: 2 May 2012
- Venue: Stadion Gradski vrt, Osijek
- Referee: Vlado Svilokos (Sisak)
- Attendance: 8,000
- Weather: Clear

Second leg
Dinamo Zagreb	Osijek
3	1
- Date: 9 May 2012
- Venue: Stadion Maksimir, Zagreb
- Referee: Ivan Bebek (Rijeka)
- Attendance: 10,000
- Weather: Clear; 24 °C (75 °F)

The 2012 Croatian Cup final was a two-legged affair played between Dinamo Zagreb and Osijek. The first leg was played in Osijek on 2 May 2012, while the second leg on 9 May 2012 in Zagreb.

Dinamo Zagreb won the trophy with an aggregate result of 3–1.

== Road to the final ==
Dinamo Zagreb		Round	Osijek	
Opponent	Result		Opponent	Result
Radoboj	5–0	First round	Opatija	1–0
HAŠK	4–0	Second round	Radnik Sesvete	2–1
Istra 1961	1–1	Quarter-finals	Rijeka	2–1
Istra 1961	1–1 (4–3 p)	Quarter-finals	Rijeka	2–0
NK Zagreb	1–1	Semi-finals	Cibalia	3–0
NK Zagreb	2–1	Semi-finals	Cibalia	1–2

== First leg ==
2 May 2012
19:00

Osijek	0–0	Dinamo Zagreb
	Report (in Croatian)

Stadion Gradski vrt, Osijek
Attendance: 8,000
Referee: Vlado Svilokos (Sisak)

Osijek	Dinamo Zagreb

OSIJEK:
GK	25	(Croatia) Ivan Vargić
DF	2	(Croatia) Branko Vrgoč
DF	13	(Croatia) Marko Lešković
DF	15	(Croatia) Ivan Ibriks
DF	24	(Croatia) Ivo Smoje (c)	(yellow card) 61'
MF	3	(Bosnia and Herzegovina) Josip Lukačević
MF	4	(Croatia) Hrvoje Kurtović
MF	10	(Croatia) Antonio Perošević		(substituted off) 67'
MF	17	(Croatia) Vedran Jugović	(yellow card) 60'	(substituted off) 80'
MF	22	(Croatia) Tomislav Šorša
FW	11	(Croatia) Anton Maglica		(substituted off) 90+1'
Substitutes:
MF	21	(Bosnia and Herzegovina) Zoran Kvržić		(substituted on) 67'
DF	5	(Croatia) Domagoj Pušić		(substituted on) 80'
MF	20	(Croatia) Nikša Petrović		(substituted on) 90+1'
Manager:
(Croatia) Stanko Mršić

DINAMO ZAGREB:
GK	30	(Croatia) Ivan Kelava
DF	4	(Croatia) Josip Šimunić		(substituted off) 80'
DF	13	(Portugal) Tonel
DF	19	(Croatia) Josip Pivarić	(yellow card) 82'
DF	24	(Croatia) Domagoj Vida
MF	7	(Croatia) Jerko Leko
MF	8	(Croatia) Mateo Kovačić
MF	10	(Croatia) Sammir	(yellow card) 60'	(substituted off) 86'
MF	11	(Croatia) Ivan Tomečak
MF	16	(Croatia) Milan Badelj (c)
FW	99	(Croatia) Ivan Krstanović		(substituted off) 39'
Substitutes:
FW	21	(Montenegro) Fatos Bećiraj		(substituted on) 39'
DF	14	(Croatia) Šime Vrsaljko		(substituted on) 80'
MF	20	(Bosnia and Herzegovina) Mehmed Alispahić		(substituted on) 86'
Manager:
(Croatia) Ante Čačić

Assistant referees:
Siniša Premužaj (Varaždin)
Mladen Lončar (Virovitica)
Fourth official:
Igor Križarić (Čakovec)

Match rules

- 90 minutes.
- Seven named substitutes.
- Maximum of three substitutions.

== Second leg ==
9 May 2012
18:00

Dinamo Zagreb	3–1	Osijek
Kovačić 51'; Bećiraj 63'; Ibáñez 90+1'	Report (in Croatian)	Vrsaljko 69' (o.g.)

Stadion Maksimir, Zagreb
Attendance: 10,000
Referee: Ivan Bebek (Rijeka)

Dinamo Zagreb	Osijek

DINAMO ZAGREB:
GK	30	(Croatia) Ivan Kelava	(yellow card) 74'
DF	13	(Portugal) Tonel	(yellow card) 85'
DF	14	(Croatia) Šime Vrsaljko
DF	19	(Croatia) Josip Pivarić
DF	24	(Croatia) Domagoj Vida
MF	5	(Argentina) Adrián Calello
MF	7	(Croatia) Jerko Leko
MF	8	(Croatia) Mateo Kovačić	(yellow card) 51'	(substituted off) 65'
MF	10	(Croatia) Sammir		(substituted off) 79'
MF	16	(Croatia) Milan Badelj (c)
FW	21	(Montenegro) Fatos Bećiraj
Substitutes:
MF	23	(Croatia) Nikola Pokrivač		(substituted on) 65'
DF	3	(Argentina) Luis Ibáñez		(substituted on) 79'
Manager:
(Croatia) Ante Čačić

OSIJEK:
GK	25	(Croatia) Ivan Vargić
DF	2	(Croatia) Branko Vrgoč	(yellow card) 43'
DF	13	(Croatia) Marko Lešković	(yellow card) 73'
DF	15	(Croatia) Ivan Ibriks
DF	24	(Croatia) Ivo Smoje (c)
MF	3	(Bosnia and Herzegovina) Josip Lukačević
MF	4	(Croatia) Hrvoje Kurtović		(substituted off) 65'
MF	17	(Croatia) Vedran Jugović	(yellow card) 19'
MF	21	(Bosnia and Herzegovina) Zoran Kvržić		(substituted off) 80'
MF	22	(Croatia) Tomislav Šorša		(substituted off) 65'
FW	11	(Croatia) Anton Maglica
Substitutes:
DF	5	(Croatia) Domagoj Pušić		(substituted on) 65'
FW	21	(Croatia) Ivan Miličević		(substituted on) 65'
MF	20	(Croatia) Nikša Petrović		(substituted on) 80'
Manager:
(Croatia) Stanko Mršić

Assistant referees:
Petar Gabrilo (Split)
Robi Kezele (Rijeka)
Fourth official:
Domagoj Vučkov (Rijeka)

Match rules

- 90 minutes.
- Penalty shoot-out if scores still level; no extra time.
- Seven named substitutes.
- Maximum of three substitutions.
