= Marin Skender =

Croatian retired football goalkeeper (born 1979)

Personal information
- Date of birth: 12 August 1979 (age 47)
- Place of birth: Osijek, SFR Yugoslavia
- Height: 1.88 m (6 ft 2 in)
- Position: Goalkeeper

Youth career
- Olimpija Osijek

Senior career*
Years	Team	Apps	(Gls)
1998–2000	Olimpija Osijek		
2000–2001	Vukovar '91		
2001–2009	Osijek	175	(0)
2009–2010	NK Zagreb	13	(0)
2010–2011	Dinamo Zagreb	0	(0)
2012–2013	FC Dila Gori	38	(0)
2013–2017	SønderjyskE	121	(0)
- * Club domestic league appearances and goals as of 1 October 2017

Marin Skender (born 12 August 1979) is a Croatian retired football goalkeeper.

== Career ==
Advancing through the youth ranks of NK Osijek, Skender went on to start his senior career with amateur side NK Olimpija Osijek in 2000, moving to NK Vukovar '91 the following year. After spending two seasons with Vukovar, he returned to NK Osijek in the summer of 2003 and joined their first team competing in the Croatian First League.

He soon found his place as a regular at NK Osijek, appearing in all of their domestic league games for three consecutive seasons between 2005 and 2008, as well as being the club's first-choice goalkeeper for more than five years. During this time, he was considered one of the best goalkeepers in the Croatian top flight, even earning himself a call-up to the Croatia national team at the beginning of their qualifying campaign for the UEFA Euro 2008 in the summer of 2006.

During the UEFA Euro 2008 qualifiers, Skender competed with Mario Galinović for the place of the national team's third-choice goalkeeper behind Stipe Pletikosa and Vedran Runje, being named on the bench for Croatia's away game at Israel in November 2006, where he remained an unused substitute as Runje played the entire game.

Following the end of the 2008–09 season, he was released from his contract at NK Osijek and was without a club until NK Zagreb signed him in October 2009.

Following the end of the 2009–10 season, he was released from his contract at NK Zagreb and was without a club until NK Dinamo Zagreb signed him in September 2010.

He was signed by Danish Superliga side SønderjyskE on 26 January 2013
