= Mateo Kovačić =

Croatian footballer (born 1994)

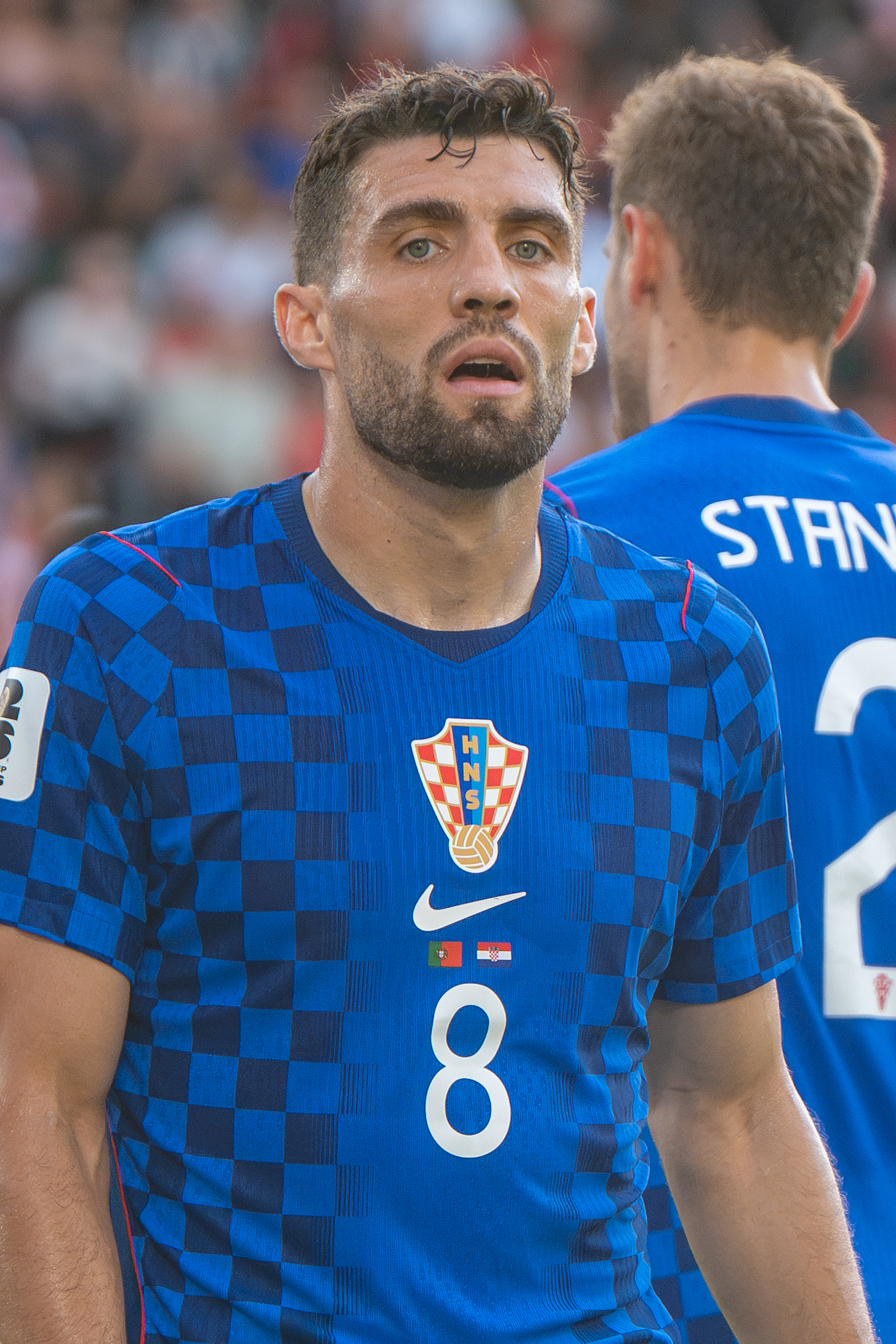
- Kovačić with Croatia at the 2026 FIFA World Cup

Personal information
- Full name: Mateo Kovačić
- Date of birth: 6 May 1994 (age 32)
- Place of birth: Linz, Austria
- Height: 1.77 m (5 ft 10 in)
- Position: Central midfielder

Team information
- Current team: Manchester City
- Number: 8

Youth career
- 2000–2007: LASK
- 2007–2010: Dinamo Zagreb

Senior career*
Years	Team	Apps	(Gls)
2010–2013	Dinamo Zagreb	43	(6)
2013–2015	Inter Milan	80	(5)
2015–2019	Real Madrid	73	(1)
2018–2019	→ Chelsea (loan)	32	(0)
2019–2023	Chelsea	110	(4)
2023–	Manchester City	70	(7)

International career^{‡}
2008	Croatia U14	2	(1)
2008	Croatia U15	2	(0)
2009–2011	Croatia U17	15	(0)
2011–2012	Croatia U19	6	(0)
2011–2014	Croatia U21	7	(0)
2013–	Croatia	123	(5)
Medal record
Men's football
Representing Croatia
FIFA World Cup
Runner-up	2018 Russia
Third place	2022 Qatar
UEFA Nations League
Runner-up	2023 Netherlands
- * Club domestic league appearances and goals as of 23:05, 17 October 2026 (UTC) ‡ National team caps and goals as of 23:30, 15 November 2026 (UTC)

Mateo Kovačić (Croatian pronunciation: [matěo kǒʋatʃitɕ]; born 6 May 1994) is a professional footballer who plays as a central midfielder for Premier League club Manchester City and the Croatia national team.

Kovačić began his professional career with Dinamo Zagreb at the age of 16, with whom he won two consecutive Prva HNL titles, before joining Inter Milan in 2013. In 2015, he moved to Real Madrid, where he won nine trophies, including three UEFA Champions League titles between 2016 and 2018. He subsequently joined Chelsea, where he won the UEFA Europa League, a fourth Champions League title, the UEFA Super Cup and the FIFA Club World Cup, as well as being named Chelsea Player of the Year for the 2019–20 season. He joined Manchester City in the summer of 2023, and won the Premier League with them in his first season.

Born in Austria, Kovačić played for Croatia at multiple youth levels before making his debut for the senior national team in 2013. He has represented the nation at the 2014, 2018, 2022 and 2026 FIFA World Cups, as well as the 2016, 2020 and 2024 UEFA European Championships. His side secured two World Cup medals in 2018 and 2022, as well as a silver medal coming in second in the 2023 UEFA Nations League final.

== Club career ==
=== Youth career ===
Kovačić began playing at an early age at the local LASK's academy. In 2007, when Kovačić was 13, he was spotted by scouts from several prominent European clubs, including Ajax, Inter Milan, Juventus and Bayern Munich, but his family opted to move to Zagreb instead, where he joined the academy of Croatian club Dinamo Zagreb.

In 2009, at the age of 15, Kovačić suffered a serious injury. His leg was broken and he could not even stand on it for the first four months after the injury. After a lengthy recovery, he finally returned to the team on 31 May 2010, appearing in the last match of the Croatian under-17 academy league, in a friendly 5–0 win against RNK Split under-17s.

=== Dinamo Zagreb ===
Kovačić started training with the club's senior squad under manager, Vahid Halilhodžić, four months later, on 6 October 2010, but continued to appear for the club in academy league matches during October. Later that month, it was reported by the local sports daily, Sportske novosti, that Arsenal's chief scout, Steve Rowley, had arrived in Zagreb to watch him perform in under-17 matches against HNK Cibalia and NK Zagreb. Kovačić had his professional league debut in the 2010–11 Prva HNL away match against Hrvatski Dragovoljac on 20 November 2010, in which he scored Dinamo's fourth goal in their 6–0 win. This made him the youngest goalscorer in the history of the league, at the age of 16 years and 198 days, breaking the record set only a week earlier by Dino Špehar who had scored for NK Osijek at the age of 16 years and 278 days on 13 November 2010. In his first senior season with Dinamo Zagreb he appeared in seven matches, making a contribution in winning the league title.

In the 2011–12 season, Kovačić rapidly established himself as a first-team regular. He played mainly in the position of left midfielder in 4–2–3–1 system. Early in the season, he helped the team reach the group stage of the season's UEFA Champions League for the first time in 12 years. Being only 17 years old, he appeared in the starting line-up of Dinamo's first group match against Real Madrid. He finished his first European season with Dinamo by scoring a goal against Lyon in the last game of the group stage in Zagreb and thus became the second youngest ever scorer in the Champions League. In the domestic league, he was a regular starter, appearing in 25 league matches and scoring five goals in the process. During a league match against NK Lučko, he became the youngest player to captain Dinamo, when taking the captaincy from Leandro Cufré. It was another successful season for him in domestic competitions as he appeared in 32 domestic league and cup matches during that season, helping Dinamo to win their seventh consecutive league title. He also scored in the 2012 Croatian Cup final against Osijek at Stadion Maksimir. In December 2011, he was named Croatian Football Hope of the Year.

In the beginning of 2012–13 season, he suffered a metatarsal bone injury that caused him to miss several games on the club's qualifying road to another Champions League. He returned just in time to play in Dinamo's first 2012–13 Champions League game against Porto. Kovačić played in all six Dinamo Zagreb's matches in the 2012–13 Champions League group stage, against Porto, Paris Saint-Germain and Dynamo Kyiv. He continued to impress with his mature performances at a young age during the first half of the season. In October 2012, he was nominated for Golden Boy, an award given by sports journalists to a young player from Europe perceived to have been the most impressive during a season. During the season's winter break, Dinamo's board threw away the speculations about Kovačić leaving the club in the near future by saying they are building a new team around him and another rising star, Alen Halilović.

=== Inter Milan ===
==== 2012–13 season ====
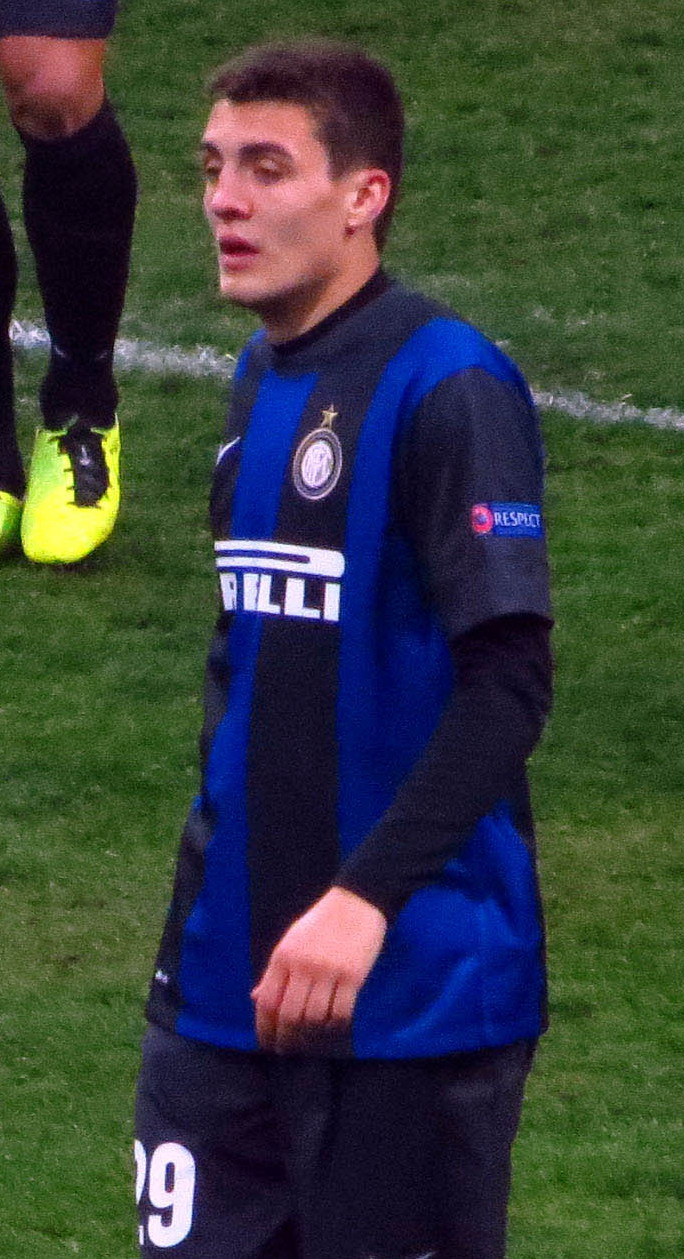
Kovačić playing for Inter Milan in 2013

On 31 January 2013, Kovačić agreed to a transfer to Serie A club Inter Milan. The deal was worth €15 million in total, with €11 million paid immediately and €4 million if Inter were to qualify for the Champions League. He made his Inter Milan debut three days later on 3 February, coming on as a half-time substitute in a 2012–13 Serie A match against Siena. On 14 February, Kovačić made his European debut before the home crowd at San Siro in a 2012–13 UEFA Europa League match against CFR Cluj. He provided the winning assist for Rodrigo Palacio, who made it 2–0 for Inter, impressing the crowd with his performance, and was given standing ovations while being substituted off in the 89th minute.

Kovačić made his first domestic league start for Inter in the next round of Serie A in a 1–4 away loss against Fiorentina. In the round of 16 of the Europa League, Inter was drawn to play against Tottenham Hotspur. After a 3–0 loss in London, Inter needed a 4–0 win in Milan to proceed to the next round. The match ended in a 4–1 win for Inter after the match went into extra time, with Kovačić playing as a starter. He impressed with his composure and playmaking ability, once again receiving ovations by the fans. Inter manager Andrea Stramaccioni hailed his performances on several occasions, describing him as a "star for the future".

On 30 March, Kovačić was a starter in his first Derby d'Italia against Juventus at San Siro. The derby ended in a 1–2 win for Juventus, with Kovačić starting the action that resulted in Rodrigo Palacio's 1–1 equaliser. Kovačić was a starter in Inter's next Serie A match, a 0–2 away win against Sampdoria, as well as in their surprising 3–4 loss to Atalanta at San Siro, where he provided an assist for Ricky Álvarez's goal. By the end of the second half of the season, he was a starter in all of the club's Serie A fixtures, as Inter finished in disappointing ninth place on the Serie A table. In May, he was given the "Gentleman Revelation of the Year" award, awarded by Inter fans.

==== 2013–2015 ====
Kovačić missed most of the pre-season training with the squad due to series of small injuries, and made his comeback just few days before the first official match of the new season, a Coppa Italia match against Cittadella at Stadio Giuseppe Meazza. During the pre-season interviews, new Inter manager Walter Mazzarri hinted Kovačić would be given a new role on the pitch, a role similar to Marek Hamšík's in Napoli. During the first half of the season, Kovačić played regularly, although he struggled with adjusting to his new tactical role. Kovačić made his first assist of the season in the match against Livorno, when he delivered an assist for Yuto Nagatomo. Unlike the previous season under manager Andrea Stramaccioni, Kovačić was not a regular starter during the 2013–14 season. In 32 Serie A matches played, he started only 14, playing the entire 90 minutes on just eight occasions. He received the chance to restore his confidence towards the end of the season, as he was Mazzarri's first-choice in the midfield in Inter's last six matches.

After being subjected to persistent transfer speculation over the summer, in September 2014, Kovačić was offered a contract extension until 2019. He started the season in strong fashion, scoring a hat-trick in the second leg of the Europa League play-off round against Stjarnan on 28 August. He scored his first league goal for Inter and assisted twice in a 7–0 win over Sassuolo on 14 September 2014. He scored the club's only goal in a 1–1 away draw with Palermo. He also scored the opening goal in a 2–0 win against ChievoVerona and scored a wonder goal in a 2–2 drawn against Lazio. On 6 January 2015, he was sent-off in a 1–1 draw with Juventus for a foul on Stephan Lichtsteiner. Three days later, Kovačić renewed his contract with Inter until June 2019.

=== Real Madrid ===
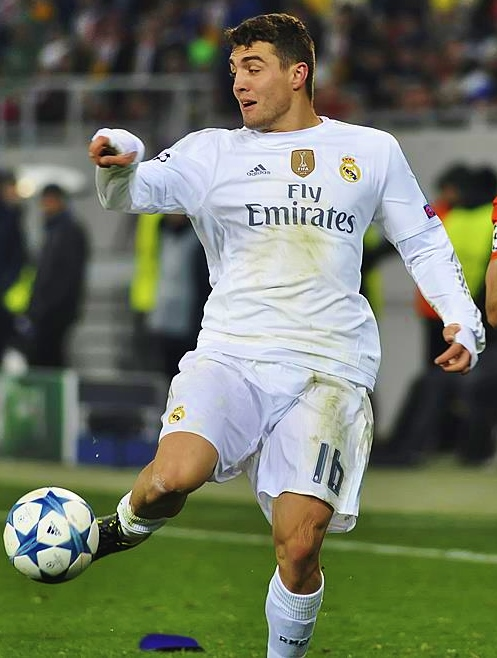
Kovačić playing for Real Madrid in 2015

On 16 August 2015, Inter manager Roberto Mancini confirmed the club was forced to sell Kovačić to La Liga club Real Madrid due to UEFA Financial Fair Play Regulations. Real Madrid also confirmed the transfer two days later, announcing Kovačić had signed a six-year contract with the club. The transfer fee was €29 million, according to Inter's financial filings. On 19 August, Kovačić was unveiled as a new player by Real Madrid at the Santiago Bernabéu Stadium. Kovačić became the fifth Croatian player, after Robert Prosinečki, Davor Šuker, Robert Jarni and Luka Modrić, to join Real Madrid.

Four days after his presentation, he made his debut as a 70th-minute substitute for Isco as Real Madrid began the 2015–16 La Liga with a 0–0 draw away to Sporting Gijón. He scored his first goal in an 8–0 home win over Malmö FF on 8 December 2015. He made 34 appearances in his first season at Real Madrid. In the opening months of the season, he was used quite regularly by then Real Madrid manager Rafael Benítez, playing in almost every midfield position there is – sometimes central, sometimes wide, sometimes further forward. However, after Zinedine Zidane replaced Benítez in early January, Kovačić's appearances became increasingly infrequent. With the Frenchman preferring to use a very defined starting 11 whenever possible instead of the more specific-lineups-for-specific-opponents approach employed by his predecessor, there was little room for Kovačić. He made eight appearances and scored one goal as Real Madrid won the 2015–16 Champions League.

Kovačić scored his first Liga goal on 29 January 2017 in a 3–0 win over Real Sociedad. He was a part-time starter when Madrid won the 2016–17 La Liga and the 2016–17 Champions League. During the 2017–18 Champions League, Kovačić made six appearances as Madrid won their third consecutive—and 13th overall—Champions League title.

=== Chelsea ===
==== 2018–2020 ====
On 8 August 2018, Kovačić joined Premier League club Chelsea on loan for the 2018–19 season. He made his debut in a 3–2 home win against Arsenal on 18 August, appearing as a second-half substitute. On 29 May 2019, he started in the 2019 Europa League final in Baku, playing until 78th minute when he was substituted off for Ross Barkley, as Chelsea beat Arsenal 4–1.

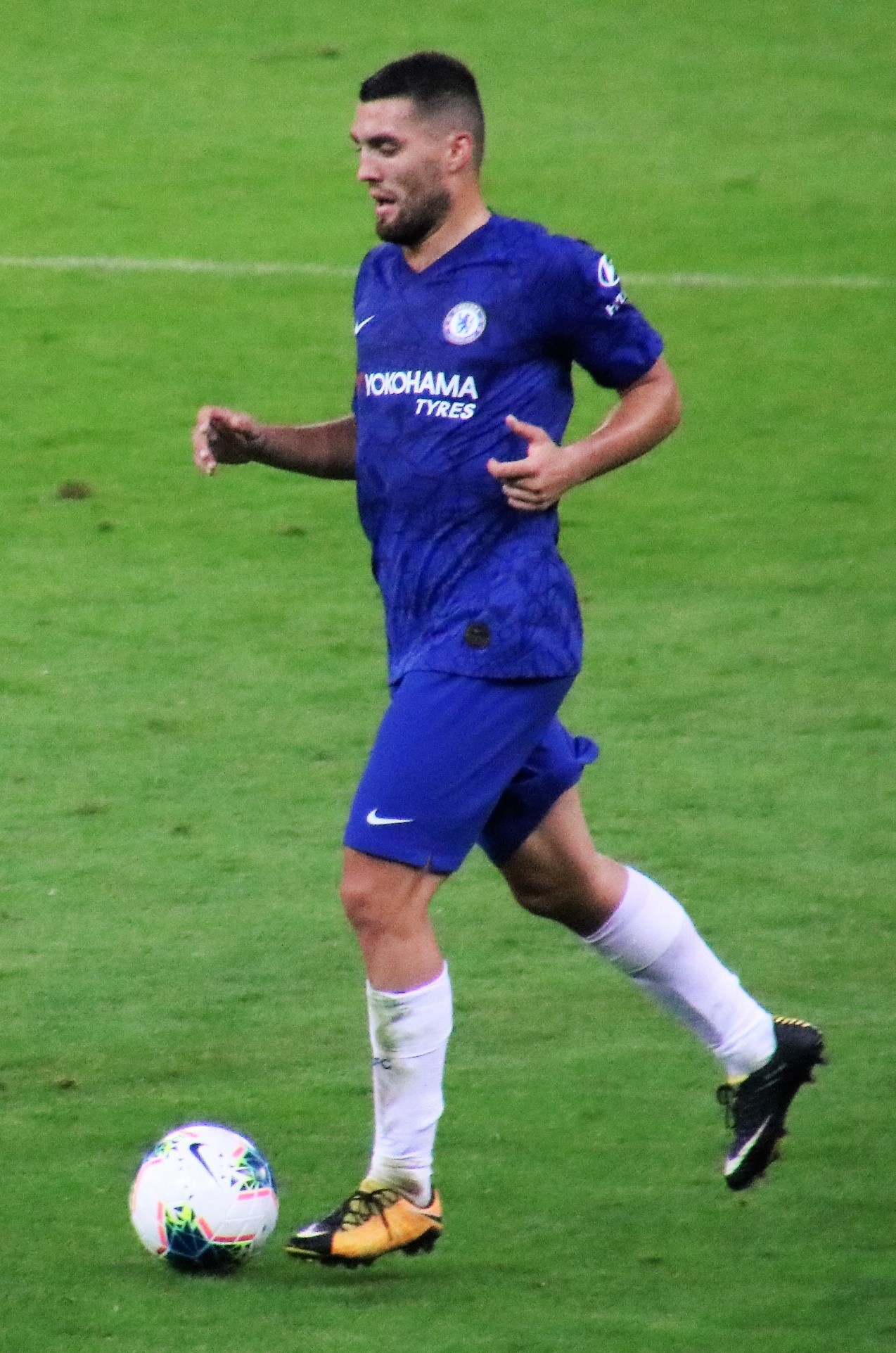
Kovačić playing for Chelsea in 2019

On 1 July 2019, Kovačić completed a permanent transfer to Chelsea, signing a five-year contract. After an underwhelming season under Maurizio Sarri, Kovačić turned into one of the most important Chelsea players under new manager Frank Lampard. Kovačić scored his first goal for Chelsea on 27 November, in a 2–2 away draw against Valencia in the 2019–20 Champions League. On 7 December, he scored his first Premier League goal in a 3–1 away loss to Everton. In the 2020 FA Cup final on 1 August 2020, he was sent off for a challenge on Granit Xhaka, as Chelsea lost 2–1 to Arsenal. On 25 August, he was named the Chelsea Player of the Year.

On 23 September 2020, Kovačić marked his 100th appearance for the club against Barnsley in the third round of the 2020–21 EFL Cup as Chelsea won 6–0 at home. After a difficult start of the season, Kovačić regained form from the previous season following the appointment of new manager Thomas Tuchel. Ahead of the second leg of the 2020–21 Champions League quarter-finals against Porto, Kovačić sustained a tendon injury and was forced to miss the semi-final tie against his former club Real Madrid, which Chelsea won 3–1 on aggregate. Despite previously winning three Champions Leagues, on 29 May 2021, Kovačić played in a Champions League final for the first time in his career, coming on for Mason Mount in the 80th minute, as Chelsea beat Manchester City 1–0.

==== 2021–2023 ====
On 11 September 2021, Kovačić provided Romelu Lukaku with an assist and scored in a 3–0 victory over Aston Villa. In late October, Kovačić suffered an injury in training and then tested positive for COVID-19 in early December. He returned to the team on 19 December, in a 0–0 draw with Wolverhampton Wanderers. On 2 January 2022, he initiated a comeback in a 2–2 home draw with Liverpool, in which he scored Chelsea's first goal while they were two goals down. He later won the Premier League Goal of the Month and the Chelsea Goal of the Year for this goal. Six days later, on 8 January, Kovačić captained Chelsea for the first time in a 5–1 victory over Chesterfield in the FA Cup. On 7 March 2023, Kovačić captained Chelsea in the 2022–23 Champions League round of 16, leading them to a 2–0 victory over Borussia Dortmund and into the quarter-finals. Four days later, on 11 March, Kovačić captained Chelsea again and scored the third goal in a 3–1 victory over Leicester City in the 2022–23 Premier League.

=== Manchester City ===
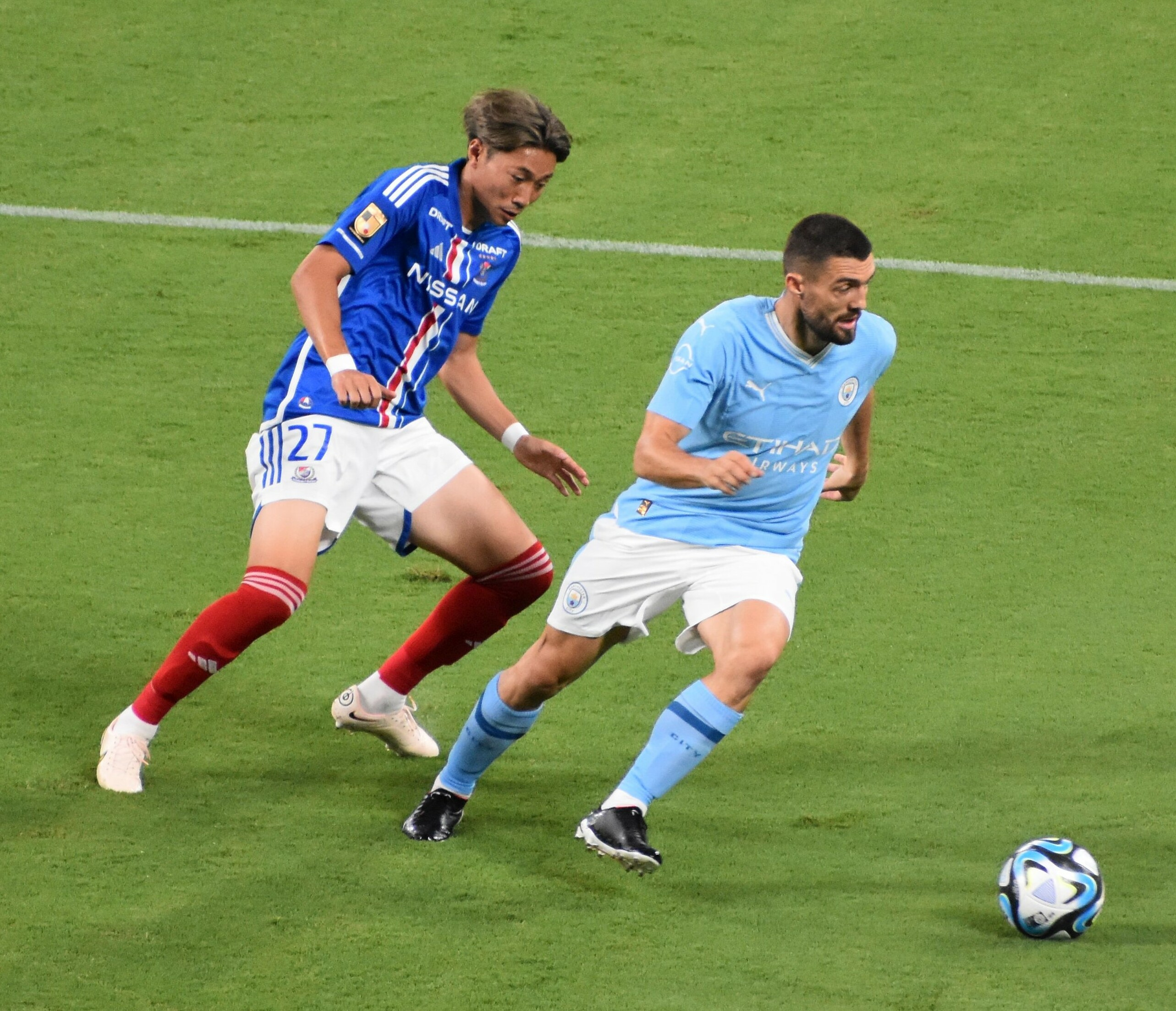
Kovačić (right) in a friendly game for Manchester City against Yokohama F. Marinos in 2023

On 27 June 2023, fellow Premier League club Manchester City announced the signing of Kovačić on a four-year deal. He became the third Croatian to sign for the club, after Vedran Ćorluka and Ante Palaversa. On 6 August, he made his competitive debut for the club against Arsenal in the FA Community Shield, which City lost 4–1 on penalties after a 1–1 draw. Kovačić won his first trophy at City on 16 August, as the Mancunian side defeated Sevilla 5–4 on penalties following a 1–1 draw in the 2023 UEFA Super Cup, with Kovačić scoring in the shootout. On 19 December 2023, Kovačić scored his first goal for Manchester City in a 3–0 FIFA Club World Cup semi-final win against Urawa Red Diamonds.

On 19 August 2024, in Manchester City's opening match of the 2024–25 Premier League season, Kovačić scored his second league goal for Manchester City as they beat his former club Chelsea 2–0 at Stamford Bridge.

== International career ==
=== Youth career ===
Kovačić appeared for the Croatia national team at various youth levels, debuting in May 2008 in an under-14 friendly match against Slovakia. Since 2011, he was a regular member of the under-19 and under-21 teams.

=== Senior career ===
==== 2012–2018 ====
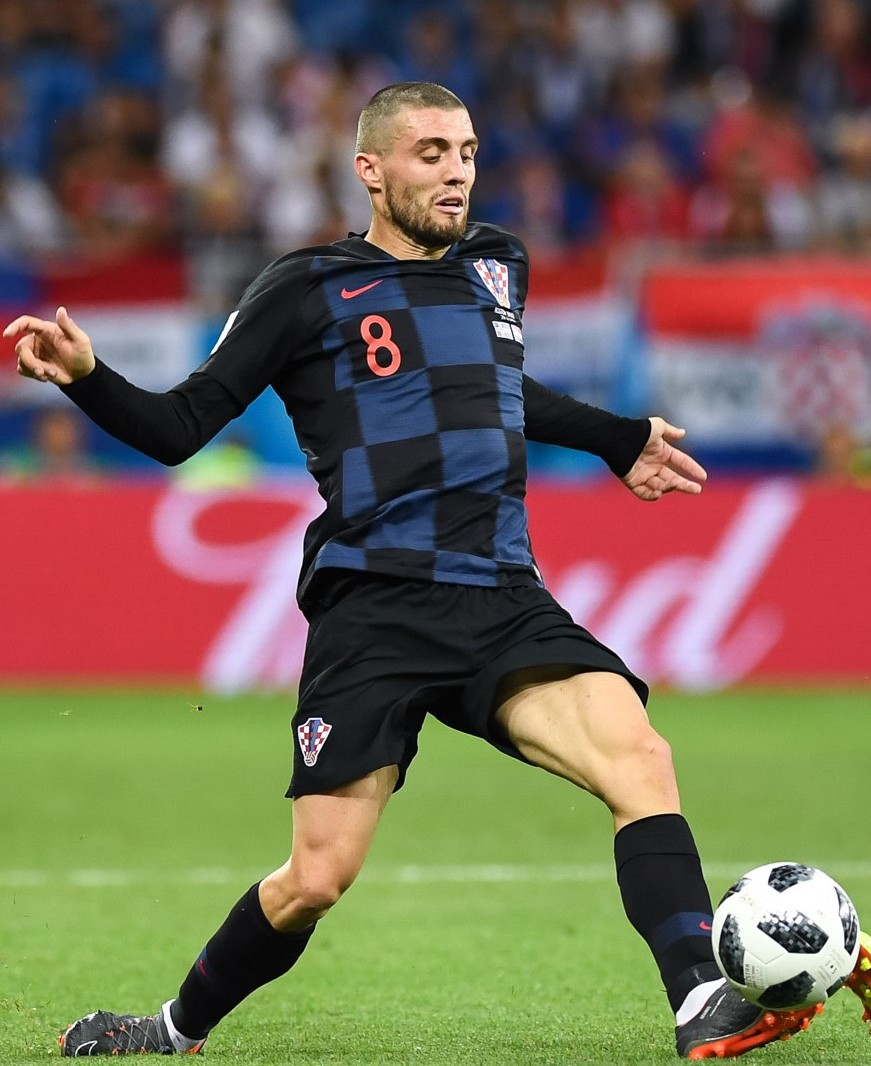
Kovačić playing for Croatia at the 2018 FIFA World Cup

In August 2012, Kovačić received his first competitive call-up for the Croatian senior team match against Switzerland, but did not play because of injury. Subsequently, he received a call up for 2014 FIFA World Cup qualification matches in March 2013. He made his senior debut in a qualification match against Serbia on 22 March, playing as a central midfielder alongside Luka Modrić, instead of a regular team starter, Ognjen Vukojević. Four days later, he played against Wales at the Liberty Stadium, coming on as a second-half substitute in a 1–2 win. His third match of the campaign came in June, when Croatia faced Scotland in Zagreb and suffered a frustrating defeat as they were unable to score despite a string of good chances. By the end of the qualifiers, Kovačić made two more competitive appearances for Croatia, as Croatia scraped into the FIFA World Cup play-offs having taken only one point from their last four qualifiers. Although he did not participate in the scoreless first leg of the play-off against Iceland in Reykjavík, Kovačić started the second leg between the two teams in Zagreb, making an assist for the team's second goal as they reached the 2014 FIFA World Cup with a 2–0 win on aggregate.

On 2 June 2014, Kovačić was named as a member of Croatia's World Cup squad. He was in Croatia's starting team for the opening game of the tournament, a 3–1 defeat to World Cup hosts Brazil at the Arena Corinthians, São Paulo, where he played for his team for 60 minutes before being substituted. He went to play all the remaining games in the group stage, as Croatia was eliminated in the group stage. On 7 June 2015, he scored his first international goal in a 4–0 victory over Gibraltar, coming in his 20th appearance for the team.

On 4 June 2018, Kovačić was selected in Zlatko Dalić's 23-man squad for the 2018 FIFA World Cup. On 22 June, Kovačić provided an assist to his teammate Ivan Rakitić as he scored Croatia's third goal in a 3–0 win over Argentina in their second group stage match of the tournament. Croatia was beaten 4–2 by France in the final on 15 July.

==== 2018–present ====
Kovačić playing for Croatia at the 2026 FIFA World Cup

Kovačić appeared in Croatia's 2018–19 UEFA Nations League A matches against Spain away and England home, that ended up as 6–0 defeat and a goalless draw, respectively. He featured throughout Croatia's successful Euro 2020 qualifying campaign, as they finished top of the group. In a 2–1 win over Wales in Osijek on 8 June 2019, he scored what would have been a goal for 2–0, however it was disallowed as Andrej Kramarić was in an offside position. In a return leg on 13 October, in the build-up to Wales' goal, Kovačić was controversially injured by Ben Davies as the match ended up as a 1–1 draw.

During Croatia's 2020–21 Nations League A campaign, Kovačić was heavily criticised for his inefficiency in the national team, especially after making an error that led to Dejan Kuluševski's opening goal in Croatia's crucial match against Sweden on 14 November 2020, that eventually finished as a 2–1 defeat. However, three days later, he scored two goals in a 3–2 defeat to Portugal, which eventually saved Croatia from relegation to the 2022–23 Nations League B as they achieved better goal difference than Sweden.

On 17 May 2021, Kovačić was selected in Dalić's 26-man squad for UEFA Euro 2020 and started all three group stage matches. In contrast to Croatia's Nations League campaign, his performances earned him widespread praise in the country as Croatia finished as the group runners-up and progressed to the round of 16. On 3 June 2022, in a 3–0 defeat to Austria in the 2022–23 Nations League A, Kovačić captained Croatia for the first time. At the 2022 FIFA World Cup, Kovačić received further praise for his performances as Croatia finished in third place.

On 20 May 2024, he was selected in the 26-man squad for the UEFA Euro 2024. A few weeks later, on 3 June, he earned his 100th international cap in a 3–0 friendly match win against North Macedonia prior to the tournament.

On 18 May 2026, Kovačić was selected in the 26-man squad for the 2026 FIFA World Cup.

== Player profile ==
=== Style of play ===
Kovačić started off as an attacking midfielder at Dinamo Zagreb, but he transformed his game at Inter where he was deployed out wide and also as a central midfielder, functioning as a deep-lying playmaker, while being coached by Andrea Stramaccioni. One of his trademarks is dropping deep to receive the ball and then driving forward, often performing his slalom runs. Under Walter Mazzarri, Kovačić was often used in a more advanced position. Former manager Giovanni Trapattoni once claimed that Kovačić knows how to reach the ball from deep and drive up the pitch like a "raging bull". Proven by his pass completion percentages, Kovačić is known for distributing the ball up the pitch.

Kovačić's style of play is characterised by exceptional ball retention and counter-pressing abilities. He combines powerful brute force with nifty changes of pace, which allows him to expertly manoeuvre through tight spaces. He lies in the 97th percentile for players dribbled past per 90 minutes, preferring to charge beyond defenders to create chances from advanced positions. Kovačić is highly proficient at what is known as "press resistance", the capacity to get out of trouble when under pressure from one or more opposition players, often via a dribble or clever pass around the corner.

=== Reception ===
The Croatia under-17 manager, Martin Novoselac, reportedly said of Kovačić, "I haven't seen a youngster with so much talent since the days of Robert Prosinečki," referring to his fast development and talent. Kovačić revealed that precisely Prosinečki is the player he admired the most while growing up. His compatriot, Zvonimir Boban, who played for Milan for over a decade, in an interview with Sky Italia in 2013 said, "He has talents that could make him even better than me, he is an incredibly serious professional for someone his age. Kovačić is a complete player. He is not a born regista but he is playing there now. He is a complete talent that can still grow — he has incredible potential." Trapattoni described him as "a mixture of Kaká and Clarence Seedorf", because of his style of play and technical characteristics. Long-time Inter captain Javier Zanetti stated that, with the exception of Ronaldo, who had arrived to Inter when he was 21, Kovačić was the most promising youngster he had seen in his 19 years at the club.

== Personal life ==
Kovačić was born in Linz, Austria, to Bosnian Croat parents Stipo and Ružica who had moved there from Zabrđe ahead of the Yugoslav Wars. After moving to Croatia he lived and grew up in Sesvetska Sela within Zagreb. Kovačić is a Catholic and attends church every Sunday. He speaks five languages: Croatian, German, English, Italian and Spanish.

In 2017, Kovačić married his longtime girlfriend Izabel Andrijanić. On 12 October 2020, Andrijanić gave birth to their first child, a boy. The child was christened, with the first name Ivan, in July 2021, with Luka Modrić as his godfather. In 2025, they had their second child, a daughter named Luna.

== Career statistics ==
=== Club ===
As of match played 28 October 2026

Appearances and goals by club, season and competition
Club	Season	League			National cup (Note: Includes Croatian Cup, Coppa Italia, Copa del Rey, FA Cup)		League cup (Note: Includes EFL Cup)		Europe		Other		Total	
Club	Season	Division	Apps	Goals	Apps	Goals	Apps	Goals	Apps	Goals	Apps	Goals	Apps	Goals
Dinamo Zagreb	2010–11	Prva HNL	7	1	2	0	—		0	0	—		9	1
Dinamo Zagreb	2011–12	Prva HNL	25	4	7	1	—		12 (Note: Appearance(s) in UEFA Champions League)	1	—		44	6
Dinamo Zagreb	2012–13	Prva HNL	11	1	1	0	—		8	0	—		20	1
Dinamo Zagreb	Total		43	6	10	1	—		20	1	—		73	8
Inter Milan	2012–13	Serie A	13	0	1	0	—		4 (Note: Appearances in UEFA Europa League)	0	—		18	0
Inter Milan	2013–14	Serie A	32	0	3	0	—		—		—		35	0
Inter Milan	2014–15	Serie A	35	5	1	0	—		8	3	—		44	8
Inter Milan	Total		80	5	5	0	—		12	3	—		97	8
Real Madrid	2015–16	La Liga	25	0	1	0	—		8	1	—		34	1
Real Madrid	2016–17	La Liga	27	1	4	0	—		6	1	2 (Note: One appearance in UEFA Super Cup, one appearance in FIFA Club World Cup)	0	39	2
Real Madrid	2017–18	La Liga	21	0	5	0	—		7	0	3 (Note: Two appearances in Supercopa de España, one appearance in FIFA Club World Cup)	0	36	0
Real Madrid	Total		73	1	10	0	—		21	2	5	0	109	3
Chelsea (loan)	2018–19	Premier League	32	0	2	0	5	0	12	0	—		51	0
Chelsea	2019–20	Premier League	31	1	6	0	1	0	8	1	1 (Note: Appearance in UEFA Super Cup)	0	47	2
Chelsea	2020–21	Premier League	27	0	3	0	2	0	10	0	—		42	0
Chelsea	2021–22	Premier League	25	2	5	0	5	0	6	0	3 (Note: One appearance in UEFA Super Cup, two appearances in FIFA Club World Cup)	0	44	2
Chelsea	2022–23	Premier League	27	1	1	0	1	0	8	1	—		37	2
Chelsea	Chelsea total		142	4	17	0	14	0	44	2	4	0	221	6
Manchester City	2023–24	Premier League	30	1	5	1	1	0	6	0	4 (Note: One appearance in FA Community Shield, one appearance in UEFA Super Cup, two appearances and one goal in FIFA Club World Cup)	1	46	3
Manchester City	2024–25	Premier League	31	6	3	0	1	0	6	1	1 (Note: Appearance in FA Community Shield)	0	42	7
Manchester City	2025–26	Premier League	6	0	2	0	0	0	1	0	—		9	0
Manchester City	2026–27	Premier League	3	0	0	0	2	1	1	0	1	0	7	1
Manchester City	Total		70	7	10	1	4	1	14	1	6	1	104	11
Career total			407	23	52	2	18	1	111	9	15	1	604	36

=== International ===
As of match played 15 November 2026

Appearances and goals by national team and year
National team	Year	Apps	Goals
Croatia	2013	7	0
Croatia	2014	12	0
Croatia	2015	5	1
Croatia	2016	8	0
Croatia	2017	5	0
Croatia	2018	12	0
Croatia	2019	7	0
Croatia	2020	7	2
Croatia	2021	12	0
Croatia	2022	16	0
Croatia	2023	6	2
Croatia	2024	11	0
Croatia	2025	3	0
Croatia	2026	12	0
Total		123	5

As of match played 2 July 2026
Scores and results list Croatia's goal tally first, score column indicates score after each Kovačić goal

List of international goals scored by Mateo Kovačić
No.	Date	Venue	Cap	Opponent	Score	Result	Competition	Ref.
1	7 June 2015	Stadion Varteks, Varaždin, Croatia	20	Gibraltar	2–0	4–0	Friendly	
2	17 November 2020	Stadion Poljud, Split, Croatia	63	Portugal	1–0	2–3	2020–21 UEFA Nations League A	
3	17 November 2020	Stadion Poljud, Split, Croatia	63	Portugal	2–2	2–3	2020–21 UEFA Nations League A	
4	28 March 2023	Bursa Metropolitan Stadium, Bursa, Turkey	93	Turkey	1–0	2–0	UEFA Euro 2024 qualifying	
5	28 March 2023	Bursa Metropolitan Stadium, Bursa, Turkey	93	Turkey	2–0	2–0	UEFA Euro 2024 qualifying	

== Honours ==
Dinamo Zagreb

- Prva HNL: 2010–11, 2011–12
- Croatian Cup: 2010–11, 2011–12

Real Madrid

- La Liga: 2016–17
- Supercopa de España: 2017
- UEFA Champions League: 2015–16, 2016–17, 2017–18
- UEFA Super Cup: 2016, 2017
- FIFA Club World Cup: 2016, 2017

Chelsea

- UEFA Champions League: 2020–21
- UEFA Europa League: 2018–19
- UEFA Super Cup: 2021
- FIFA Club World Cup: 2021
- FA Cup runner-up: 2019–20, 2021–22
- EFL Cup runner-up: 2018–19, 2021–22

Manchester City

- Premier League: 2023–24
- FA Cup: 2025–26; runner-up: 2023–24
- EFL Cup: 2025–26
- FA Community Shield: 2024
- UEFA Super Cup: 2023
- FIFA Club World Cup: 2023

Croatia

- FIFA World Cup runner-up: 2018; third place: 2022
- UEFA Nations League runner-up: 2022–23

Individual

- Croatian Football Hope of the Year: 2011
- Chelsea Player of the Season: 2019–20
- Chelsea Goal of the Season: 2021–22
- Premier League Goal of the Month: January 2022

Orders

- Order of Duke Branimir: 2018
