= Marko Lešković =

Croatian footballer (born 1991)

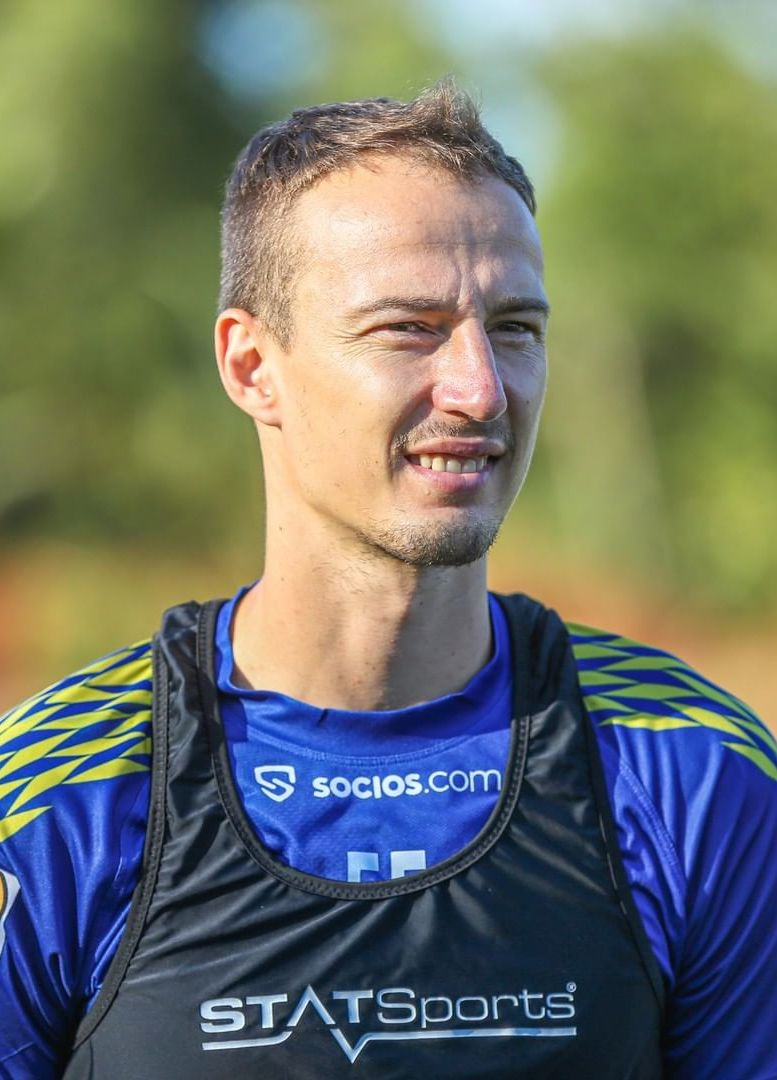
- Lešković with Kerala Blasters in 2021

Personal information
- Date of birth: 27 April 1991 (age 35)
- Place of birth: Našice, SR Croatia, SFR Yugoslavia
- Height: 1.88 m (6 ft 2 in)
- Position: Centre back

Team information
- Current team: HNK Đakovo Croatia
- Number: 25

Youth career
- 2002–2009: Osijek

Senior career*
Years	Team	Apps	(Gls)
2010–2013	Osijek	56	(5)
2010–2011	→ Suhopolje (loan)	14	(4)
2013–2016	Rijeka	62	(3)
2016–2021	Dinamo Zagreb	51	(3)
2020–2021	→ Lokomotiva (loan)	17	(4)
2021–2024	Kerala Blasters	48	(1)
2024–2025	NK Slaven Belupo	7	(0)
2025–2026	NK Koprivnica		

International career^{‡}
2009	Croatia U18	2	(0)
2009–2010	Croatia U19	3	(0)
2010–2011	Croatia U20	2	(1)
2012–2013	Croatia U21	2	(0)
2014–2017	Croatia	4	(0)
- * Club domestic league appearances and goals as of 15 June 2026 ‡ National team caps and goals as of 28 March 2017

Marko Lešković (Croatian pronunciation: [mâːrko lěʃkoʋitɕ]; born 27 April 1991) is a Croatian professional footballer who plays as a defender.

== Club career ==
=== Youth and early career ===
==== Osijek ====
Lešković started his career playing at youth level for Osijek, with whom he signed a professional contract in December 2009. In the first part of the 2010–11 season he was loaned to Druga HNL side Suhopolje where he was featured in 14 games scoring four times.

He returned to Osijek after the winter break and made his debut for the first team as a late substitute in the 2–1 win against Istra 1961 on 5 March 2011. He made one further appearance that season. In the 2011–12 season, Lešković was much more involved in the first team, making eight starts and eleven appearances off the bench. He scored his first goal in Prva HNL in a 2–2 draw with NK Zagreb on 20 March 2012. In the 2012–13 season, Lešković made 35 appearances for Osijek, playing in a range of positions including LB, CB and DM. He also scored four goals in the league as his side finished in 8th position.

=== Rijeka ===
In the summer of 2013, finalised a transfer to HNK Rijeka, signing a four-year contract. Lešković managed 25 appearances in his first season. The following season, Marko made 41 appearances as Rijeka qualified for the group stages of the Europa League and finished runners up in the 1. HNL.

=== Dinamo Zagreb ===
In July 2016, after three seasons with Rijeka, Lešković was transferred to Dinamo Zagreb. In January 2021, Lešković was loaned out to NK Lokomotiva until the end of the season.

=== Kerala Blasters ===
On 15 September 2021, Kerala Blasters announced that Lešković had joined the Indian Super League club on a one-year deal. He made his debut for the club on 19 November in the 2021–22 Indian Super League season opener against ATK Mohun Bagan FC, which they lost 4–2. He formed a formidable and successful partnership with Hormipam Ruivah and emerged as one of the best centre back pairs in the league. After a successful individual and collective season, Lešković signed a two-year contract extension for the Blasters until 2024 on 5 May 2022. On 11 November 2022, he scored his debut goal for the Blasters against the southern rivals Bengaluru FC, where he scored in the 25th minute as the Blasters won the match 3–2 at ful-time. Lešković missed the match against Mumbai City FC on 8 January 2023 due to a muscle injury. Later on 21 January, the Blasters' head coach Ivan Vukamanovic confirmed that Lešković has suffered small strain in his calf muscle and is expected to be out of action for a month. He came back from injury on 18 February 2023 against ATK Mohun Bagan in a 2–1 loss, by coming as a substitute in the 83rd minute for the goal-scorer Dimitrios Diamantakos.

During the 2023 Durand Cup, Lešković suffered a muscle injury on his right leg and missed the entire tournament. Despite recovering from the injury very soon, he suffered the same injury during the club's pre-season friendlies held at UAE. Lešković returned to the field on 29 November 2023, in the eighth league game of the 2023–24 season against Chennaiyin FC in a 3–3 draw, by coming as a substitute in the 74th minute for Kwame Peprah. In the absence of Adrian Luna, Lešković captained the team on 14 December in an away against Punjab FC which the Blasters won 1–0. Later when it was announced that Luna has been ruled out for the entire season due to a knee injury, he became the club captain in his absence. On 27 December, On 14 December, Lešković produced a player-of-the-match display against Mohun Bagan SG, helping the Blasters in a 1–0 win. It was also a third successive clean sheet victory for the club, the first time in its history.

== International career ==
Lešković has represented Croatia at all youth national levels from U18 to U21. He made his debut for the senior national team against Argentina in 2014 and earned a total of 4 caps, scoring no goals. His last international appearance was in March 2017, in a friendly match against Estonia.

== Career statistics ==
As of match played 12 April 2023

Club	Season	League			Cup		Continental		Total	
Club	Season	Division	Apps	Goals	Apps	Goals	Apps	Goals	Apps	Goals
Suhopolje (loan)	2010–11	Croatian Second Football League	14	4	3	0	–		17	4
Osijek	2010–11	Croatian First Football League	2	0	–		–		2	0
Osijek	2011–12	Croatian First Football League	19	1	6	0	–		25	1
Osijek	2012–13	Croatian First Football League	28	4	4	2	3	0	35	6
Osijek	Total		49	5	10	2	3	0	62	7
Rijeka	2013–14	Croatian First Football League	15	2	5	0	5	0	25	2
Rijeka	2014–15	Croatian First Football League	27	0	5	3	9	1	41	4
Rijeka	2015–16	Croatian First Football League	20	1	–		1	0	21	1
Rijeka	Total		62	3	10	3	15	1	87	7
Dinamo Zagreb	2016–17	Croatian First Football League	15	1	2	0	–		17	1
Dinamo Zagreb	2017–18	Croatian First Football League	13	0	3	0	1	0	17	0
Dinamo Zagreb	2018–19	Croatian First Football League	18	2	2	0	1	0	21	2
Dinamo Zagreb	2019–20	Croatian First Football League	5	0	2	0	3	0	10	0
Dinamo Zagreb	Total		51	3	9	0	5	0	65	3
Lokomotiva Zagreb (loan)	2020–21	Croatian First Football League	17	1	–		–		17	1
Kerala Blasters	2021–22	Indian Super League	21	0	–		–		21	0
Kerala Blasters	2022–23	Indian Super League	15	1	2	0	–		17	1
Kerala Blasters	Kerala Blasters total		36	1	2	0	–		38	1
Career total			229	17	34	5	23	1	286	23

== Honours ==
Osijek

- Croatian Football Cup runner-up: 2012

Rijeka

- Croatian Football Cup: 2013–14
- Croatian Football Super Cup: 2014

Dinamo Zagreb

- Prva HNL: 2017–18, 2018–19
- Croatian Football Cup: 2017–18; runner-up: 2016–17, 2018–19
- Croatian Football Super Cup: 2019

Kerala Blasters

- Indian Super League runner-up: 2021–22
