= Ivan Miličević (footballer, born 1988) =

Croatian footballer

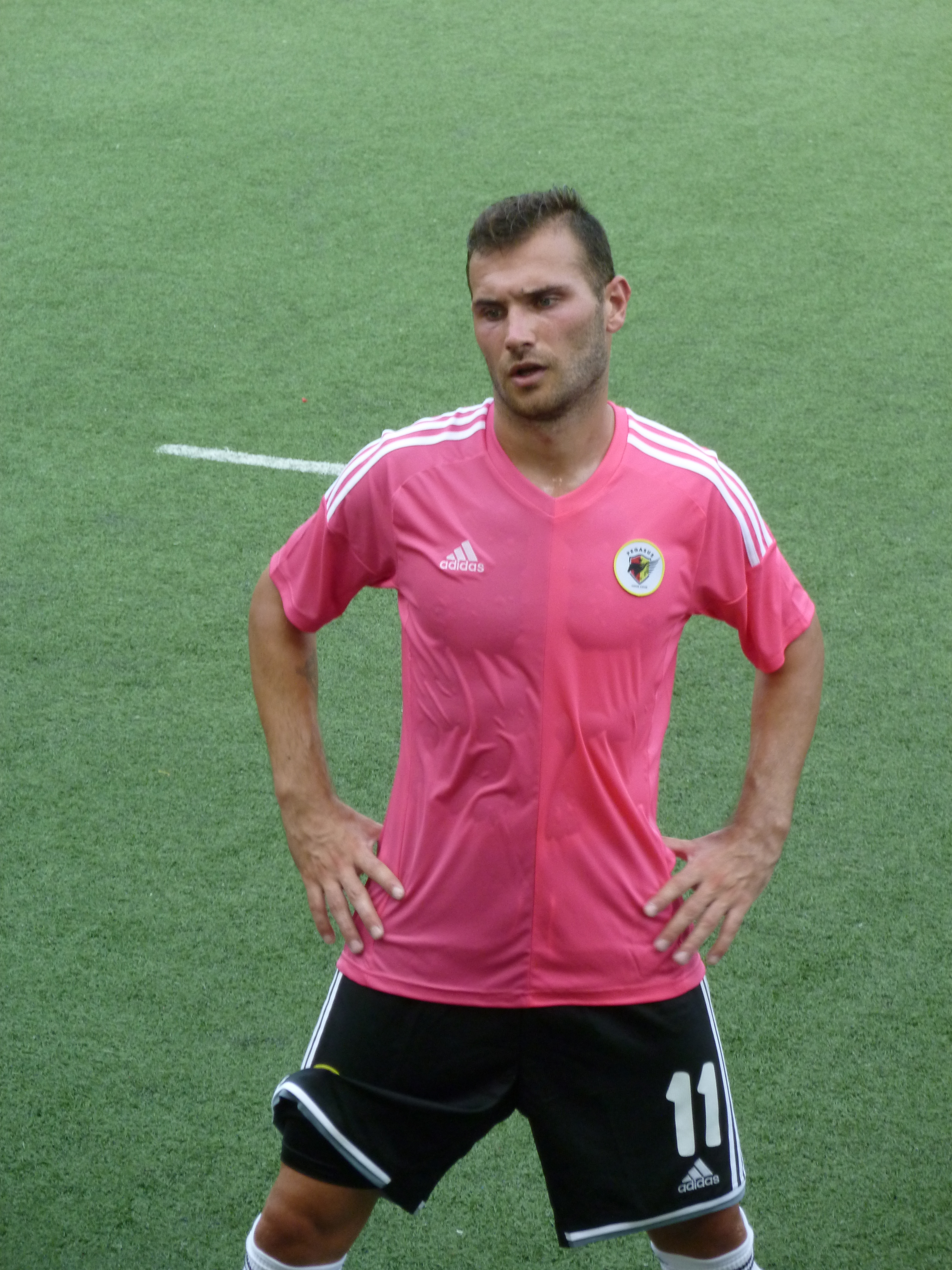
- Miličević in 2015

Personal information
- Date of birth: 11 February 1988 (age 38)
- Place of birth: Osijek, SR Croatia, SFR Yugoslavia
- Height: 1.81 m (5 ft 11 in)
- Position: Forward

Team information
- Current team: SV Prackenbach
- Number: 14

Youth career
- Osijek

Senior career*
Years	Team	Apps	(Gls)
2007–2013	Osijek	122	(23)
2007–2008	→ Olimpija Osijek (loan)	28	(22)
2013	San Antonio Scorpions	5	(0)
2013–2014	Istra 1961	9	(0)
2014–2015	Triestina	21	(5)
2015	Pegasus	0	(0)
2015	Picerno	7	(2)
2015–2016	ASD Lanusei	12	(1)
2016	Sangiovannese 1927	4	(0)
2017	Dro Alto Garda	10	(0)
2017–2018	Cibalia	27	(1)
2018–2022	DJK Vilzing	49	(20)
2022–2023	1. FC Bad Kötzting	29	(14)
2023–2024	TV Waldmünchen	22	(12)
2024–2025	SpVgg Plattling	22	(5)
2025–	SV Prackenbach	21	(8)

International career
2008–2009	Croatia U20	7	(2)
2009	Croatia U21	1	(0)
- * Club domestic league appearances and goals as of 20:37, 27 July 2026 (UTC)

Ivan Miličević (born 11 February 1988) is a Croatian footballer who is plays as a forward for SV Prackenbach in Germany.

== Career statistics ==
Club	Season	League		Cup		Europe		Total	
Club	Season	Apps	Goals	Apps	Goals	Apps	Goals	Apps	Goals
Olimpija Osijek	2007–08	28	22	1	0	–		29	22
Osijek	2008–09	31	5	1	0	–		32	5
Osijek	2009–10	28	8	3	0	–		31	8
Osijek	2010–11	26	5	4	1	–		30	6
Osijek	2011–12	25	2	6	0	–		31	2
Osijek	2012–13	12	3	3	1	4	2	19	6
	Total	150	45	18	2	4	2	172	49
Last Update: 1 March 2013
