= Mislav Leko =

Croatian footballer

Personal information
- Date of birth: 19 December 1987 (age 38)
- Place of birth: Osijek, Croatia
- Height: 1.93 m (6 ft 4 in)
- Position: Central defender

Senior career*
| Years | Team | Apps | (Gls) |
| 2007–2008 | Olimpija Osijek | | |
| 2008–2009 | Junak Sinj | 13 | (3) |
| 2009–2011 | Hrvatski Dragovoljac | 32 | (3) |
| 2011 | Karlovac | 13 | (0) |
| 2012–2013 | Osijek | 20 | (0) |
| 2014–2015 | FC Brașov | 40 | (3) |
| 2016 | Osijek | 4 | (0) |
| 2017–2018 | Fredrikstad | 49 | (2) |
| Total | | 171 | (11) |
- * Club domestic league appearances and goals

Mislav Leko (born 19 December 1987) is a Croatian retired football defender.
