= Marin Zulim =

Croatian footballer

Personal information
- Date of birth: 26 October 1991 (age 35)
- Place of birth: Split, Croatia
- Height: 1.83 m (6 ft 0 in)
- Positions: Midfielder; forward

Youth career
- Hajduk Split

Senior career*
| Years | Team | Apps | (Gls) |
| 2011 | Hajduk Split | 0 | (0) |
| 2011 | → Zadar (loan) | 3 | (0) |
| 2011–2012 | Lučko | 14 | (0) |
| 2012–2013 | Osijek | 15 | (0) |
| 2013–2014 | RNK Split | 1 | (0) |
| 2014–2015 | Istra 1961 | 1 | (0) |
| 2015 | Dugopolje | 5 | (0) |
| 2015–2019 | Inter Zaprešić | 54 | (0) |
| 2020 | Dugopolje | 0 | (0) |

International career
| 2007 | Croatia U16 | 5 | (0) |
| 2007–2008 | Croatia U17 | 4 | (0) |
| 2009 | Croatia U18 | 7 | (0) |
- * Club domestic league appearances and goals as of 08:30, 3 April 2020 (UTC)

Marin Zulim (born 26 October 1991) is a Croatian professional footballer who most recently played as a midfielder or forward for Dugopolje.
