= Branko Vrgoč =

Croatian footballer (born 1989)

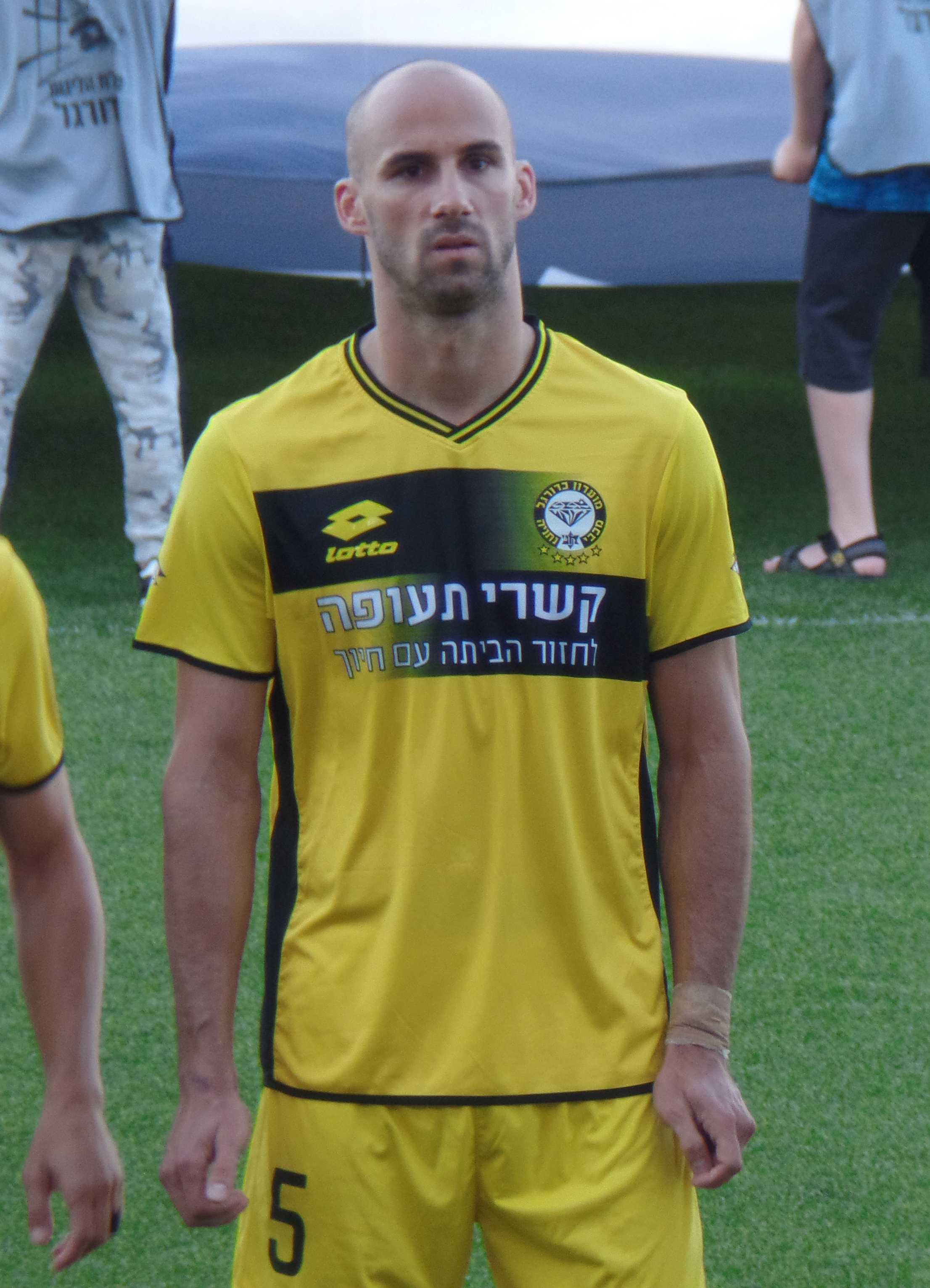
- Vrgoč in 2019

Personal information
- Date of birth: 18 December 1989 (age 36)
- Place of birth: Osijek, Croatia
- Height: 1.95 m (6 ft 5 in)
- Position: Centre-back

Team information
- Current team: Posušje
- Number: 5

Youth career
- Osijek
- 2004–2006: Višnjevac
- 2006–2008: Osijek

Senior career*
Years	Team	Apps	(Gls)
2008–2013	Osijek	56	(2)
2008–2009	→ Slavonac CO (loan)	22	(0)
2013–2016	Split	43	(1)
2016–2019	Maccabi Netanya	71	(0)
2019–2021	Anorthosis	52	(2)
2021–2022	Panetolikos	15	(0)
2022–2023	Maccabi Petah Tikva	16	(0)
2023–	Posušje	46	(2)

International career^{‡}
2008 –2009	Croatia U19	2	(0)
- * Club domestic league appearances and goals as of 1 June 2025 ‡ National team caps and goals as of 16 April 2008

Branko Vrgoč (born 18 December 1989) is a Croatian professional footballer who plays as a centre-back for Bosnian Premier League club HŠK Posušje.

== Club career ==
Vrgoč started his career playing at youth level for his hometown club Osijek. He was loaned to Druga HNL side Slavonac CO for the 2008–09 season and helped them secure a promotion spot to the Prva HNL. However, after they were unable to find a suitable ground for hosting matches, Slavonac CO were demoted to first county league. In September 2009, Vrgoč sustained a cruciate ligament injury during the preparations for the upcoming season. He underwent three surgeries during the period of one year and missed out 2009–10 season. Manager Branko Karačić, who previously coached Vrgoč in Slavonac CO, included him in the team that underwent mid-season preparations in Turkey for the second part of the 2010–11 season. He made his debut for the first team in a goalless draw against Lokomotiva on 25 February 2011.

== Career statistics ==
As to 1 June 2022

Club	Season	League		Cup		League Cup		Europe		Total	
Club	Season	Apps	Goals	Apps	Goals	Apps	Goals	Apps	Goals	Apps	Goals
Slavonac CO (loan)	2008–09	22	0	–		–		–		22	0
Osijek	2010–11	11	0	–		–		–		11	0
Osijek	2011–12	25	0	7	1	–		–		32	1
Osijek	2012–13	20	1	4	0	–		4	0	28	1
RNK Split	2013–14	14	1	–		–		–		14	1
RNK Split	2014–15	18	0	6	0	–		–		24	0
RNK Split	2015–16	11	0	0	0	–		–		11	0
Maccabi Netanya	2016–17	32	0	1	0	3	0	–		36	0
Maccabi Netanya	2017–18	19	0	2	0	–		–		21	0
Maccabi Netanya	2018–19	20	0	6	0	1	0	–		27	0
Anorthosis	2019–20	23	0	3	0	–		–		26	0
Anorthosis	2020–21	29	2	5	0	–		1	1	35	3
Panetolikos	2021–22	15	0	3	0	–		–		18	0
Maccabi Petah Tikva	2022–23	16	0	2	0	2	1	–		20	1
Total		264	4	39	1	6	1	5	1	314	7

== Honours ==
- Liga Leumit
  - Winner (1): 2016–17
- Cypriot Cup
  - Winner (1): 2020-21
