= Goran Todorčev =

Macedonian footballer

Personal information
- Full name: Goran Todorčev; Горан Тодорчев
- Date of birth: 21 January 1984 (age 42)
- Place of birth: Negotino, SR Macedonia, Yugoslavia
- Height: 1.81 m (5 ft 11 1/2 in)
- Position: Midfielder

Team information
- Current team: Rabotnički

Senior career*
Years	Team	Apps	(Gls)
2001–2007	Rabotnički	83	(3)
2007–2010	Osijek	66	(1)
2010–2012	Inter Zaprešić	25	(0)
2012	Rabotnički	1	(0)
2014	Teteks		
- * Club domestic league appearances and goals as of 1 May 2020 ‡ National team caps and goals as of 8 November 2010

Goran Todorčev (Macedonian: Горан Тодорчев) (born 21 January 1984 in Negotino) is a Macedonian retired football player.

== Club career ==
He rejoined Rabotnički after playing for the Croatian club Inter Zaprešić.

== International career ==
Todorčev was called up to the Macedonian national team for the first time for a friendly against Albania on 17 November 2010 but he was forced to withdraw because of an injury.
