= Goran Ljubojević =

Croatian footballer

Personal information
- Date of birth: 4 May 1983 (age 43)
- Place of birth: Osijek, SFR Yugoslavia
- Height: 1.91 m (6 ft 3 in)
- Position: Forward

Youth career
- Osijek

Senior career*
Years	Team	Apps	(Gls)
2001–2004	Osijek	64	(23)
2004–2006	Dinamo Zagreb	41	(13)
2006	→ St. Gallen (loan)	17	(5)
2006–2009	Genk	38	(12)
2009–2010	NK Zagreb	12	(6)
2010–2011	AIK	11	(2)
2011–2012	Osijek	25	(6)
2012	Târgu Mureș	9	(5)
2012–2013	Naft Tehran	11	(4)
2013–2014	Osijek	8	(6)
2014–2015	Balestier Khalsa	27	(20)
2015–2016	Sriwijaya	9	(3)
2016	Vinogradar	15	(10)
2017	Trnje	9	(2)
Total		296	(117)

International career
2003–2005	Croatia U21	18	(3)
- * Club domestic league appearances and goals

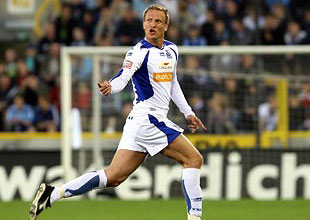
Goran Ljubojević

Goran Ljubojević (Croatian pronunciation: [ɡǒran ʎubǒːjeʋitɕ]; born 4 May 1983) is a Croatian former footballer who played as a forward.

== Club career ==
As one of the best young national team players, he was transferred at the end of August 2006 from Dinamo Zagreb to KRC Genk. He also played for NK Osijek and FC St. Gallen.

In the 2006–07 season, he earned a season record of five goals in five following games. In total, he made 11 goals for KRC Genk, according to his playing time he was the most efficient scorer in the Belgian Jupiler League of that season.

In December 2009, he turned a new page in his career by signing with NK Zagreb. He scored six goals in a half season. This opened the eyes of several teams who were interested in this targetstriker. Odense and AIK showed the most interest. Finally, AIK signed him in July 2010.

"Ljubo" also was a member of the Croatia national under 21 team. His highlight was a victory over England on 13 August 2003, which Croatia won by 0–3. Ljubojević scored the first two goals and delivered the assist for the third goal.

In 2014, he joined Balestier Khalsa as their first ever marquee signing. He scored the first goal in the 2014 Singapore Cup on 7 November 2014 and the club's maiden win in the Singapore Cup. He ended the season as a club top scorer with 27 goals.

He last played for NK Trnje based in the city of Zagreb.

== Honours ==
=== Club ===
Balestier Khalsa

- Singapore Cup: 2014

KRC GENK

- Beker van Belgie: 2009

DINAMO ZAGREB

- Croatian League Champions: 2005–2006, 2006–2007

=== Individual ===
- Top goalscorers by season of Balestier Khalsa: 2014
