= Josip Barišić (footballer, born 1986) =

Croatian footballer

Personal information
- Date of birth: 14 November 1986 (age 39)
- Place of birth: Osijek, SR Croatia, Yugoslavia
- Height: 1.86 m (6 ft 1 in)
- Position: Forward

Youth career
- 2000–2005: Osijek

Senior career*
Years	Team	Apps	(Gls)
2005–2011	Osijek	126	(27)
2007	→ Koper (loan)	7	(0)
2008	→ Slavonac CO (loan)	13	(6)
2012	Oleksandriya	5	(0)
2013	RNK Split	7	(1)
2013–2014	Osijek	46	(9)
2015	Zawisza Bydgoszcz	18	(8)
2015–2018	Piast Gliwice	51	(13)
2017	→ Arka Gdynia (loan)	5	(1)
2018–2019	Cibalia	13	(5)
2019–2020	Stal Mielec	10	(0)
2020–2023	Vukovar 1991	75	(38)

International career
2006–2007	Croatia U20	4	(1)
- * Club domestic league appearances and goals

Josip Barišić (born 14 November 1986) is a Croatian former professional footballer who played as a forward.

== Club career ==
Barišić, also known as Đozla, started his career playing at youth level for his hometown club Osijek, with whom he signed a professional five-year contract in May 2005. He made his first team debut in his team's 6–0 away loss against HNK Hajduk Split in the first round of the 2005–06 Prva HNL season. After two seasons at the club, during which he also debuted for the Croatia U20 team, he went on loan - first to the Slovenian FC Koper and then to the Druga HNL team NK Slavonac CO before returning to Osijek for three and a half further seasons. In February 2012, he signed for the Ukrainian Premier League team PFC Oleksandriya, but failed to establish himself in the first team squad and soon returned to Croatia. His next club was RNK Split in early 2013, which he left that summer, citing a lack of regular appearances as the cause, and signed again for his first club NK Osijek.

In early 2015, he joined Polish Ekstraklasa club Zawisza Bydgoszcz. On 23 June 2015, he joined Piast Gliwice, after Zawisza was relegated.

On 10 June 2019, Stal Mielec announced the signing of Barišić on a one-year deal. His contract was terminated on 10 January 2020.

== Honours ==
Arka Gdynia

- Polish Cup: 2016–17
