= Dino Gavrić =

Croatian footballer

Personal information
- Date of birth: 11 April 1989 (age 37)
- Place of birth: Osijek, Croatia
- Height: 1.90 m (6 ft 3 in)
- Position: Centre-back

Youth career
- –2004: Osijek
- 2004–2005: Dinamo Zagreb
- 2006–2008: Osijek

Senior career*
Years	Team	Apps	(Gls)
2008–2012	Osijek	73	(2)
2012–2013	Widzew Łódź	9	(0)
2013–2014	Enosis Paralimni	23	(1)
2014–2015	Dunaújváros	9	(0)
2016–2018	Velež Mostar	5	(0)
2016–2018	Fram Reykjavík	44	(4)
2019–2020	Þór Akureyri	20	(1)
2020–2021	Bijelo Brdo	25	(0)
- * Club domestic league appearances and goals

Dino Gavrić (born 11 April 1989) is a Croatian former professional footballer who played as a centre-back.

== Club career ==
Gavrić moved abroad in 2012 to play in Poland and later played for clubs in Cyprus, Hungary, Bosnia and Herzegovina and Iceland.
