= Nikša Petrović =

Croatian footballer (born 1992)

Personal information
- Date of birth: 27 January 1992 (age 34)
- Place of birth: Osijek, Croatia
- Height: 1.88 m (6 ft 2 in)
- Position: Midfielder

Youth career
- Osijek

Senior career*
Years	Team	Apps	(Gls)
2012–2014	Osijek	3	(1)
2014–2015	Vukovar '91		
2015-	Cepin		

International career^{‡}
2007	Croatia U15	3	(3)
2007	Croatia U16	4	(0)
2008	Croatia U17	4	(2)
2010	Croatia U18	2	(0)
2010	Croatia U19	2	(0)
- * Club domestic league appearances and goals as of 12 May 2012 ‡ National team caps and goals as of 16 September 2010

Nikša Petrović (born 27 January 1992) is a Croatian football midfielder, who played for Osijek in the Prva HNL.

Hi career with Osijek was ruined however by persisting knee injuries.
