= Igor Prijić =

Croatian footballer (born 1989)

Personal information
- Date of birth: 30 September 1989 (age 37)
- Place of birth: Osijek, SR Croatia, SFR Yugoslavia
- Height: 1.78 m (5 ft 10 in)
- Position: Forward

Youth career
- 1995–2009: Osijek

Senior career*
Years	Team	Apps	(Gls)
2007–2012	Osijek	34	(2)
2009–2010	→ Pomorac (loan)	13	(4)
2012	→ Marsonia (loan)	12	(4)
2012–2013	Segesta	27	(37)
2013	Pomorac	14	(4)
2014	Cibalia	6	(0)
2014–2015	Šibenik	31	(14)
2015–2016	Dugopolje	12	(5)
2016	Segesta	12	(9)
2016	Lučko	3	(0)
2016–2020	Vinogradar	92	(108)
2020	Jarun		
2021	Mladost Ždralovi		
2021	HNK Grabovac		
2021–2022	NK Zrinski Jurjevac		
2022–2023	Marsonia 1909		

International career
2007	Croatia U18	2	(0)
2007	Croatia U19	4	(3)
- * Club domestic league appearances and goals

Igor Prijić (born 30 September 1989) is a Croatian professional football forward. Prijić started his professional career with NK Osijek, from where he was sent on loan to Pomorac and Marsonia, before he was transferred in Segesta Sisak in 2012. He made his international debut for Croatia youth football national teams in 2007.

== Club career ==
Born in the town of Osijek, Croatia, Prijić started his career as a teenager in the Prva HNL at age 19, debuting for Osijek against Šibenik on 23 February 2008. According to Tomislav Steinbrückner, Igor's coach in junior categories, and later in the senior team, Igor was supposed to be key player in NK Osijek. Unfortunately due to some non football issues he never got a real chance in his home club. After loans in Pomorac and Marsonia in season 2012/2013, Igor was transferred in Segesta Sisak.

== International career ==
Great talent who possessed then 18-year-old Igor, brought him the call in Croatia U18 national football team. Debut in the national U18 team he had on 22 May 2007. against Bosnia and Herzegovina in Orašje. Because of the great games he received a call for Croatia national under-19 football team for which he had 4 appearances and three goals. He played in Qualification tournament for 2008 UEFA European Under-19 Football Championship, and he scores against Germany and Albania.

== New beginning in Segesta ==
At the beginning of 2012/2013 season, Hrvoje Braović (Segesta's coach) was decide to hire Prijić. Igor's debut for Segesta was on 8 September 2012 against Udarnik Kurilovec. In the next game, on 12 September, popular Prija is enrolled in history of Croatian football. He scored the fastest hat-trick in history of modern football. Only 3 minutes and 45 seconds it took him to score three goals against NK Dubrava. Throughout the season Igor was played 27 games for Segesta, and scores incredible 37 goals.
