= Josip Lukačević =

Bosnian footballer (1983–2025)

Personal information
- Date of birth: 3 November 1983
- Place of birth: Brčko, SR Bosnia and Herzegovina, SFR Yugoslavia
- Date of death: 23 October 2025 (aged 41)
- Place of death: Salzburg, Austria
- Height: 1.78 m (5 ft 10 in)
- Position: Left midfielder

Youth career
- Orašje

Senior career*
Years	Team	Apps	(Gls)
2001–2004	Orašje	19	(2)
2005	Hajduk Split	0	(0)
2005–2006	Široki Brijeg	22	(2)
2006	Graničar Županja	?	(?)
2007–2008	Čelik Zenica	39	(10)
2008	Luch-Energiya	6	(0)
2009–2010	Cibalia	32	(4)
2010–2012	Osijek	36	(1)
2012–2013	Lučko	14	(0)
2013–2014	Orašje	5	(0)
2014–2018	SC Golling	101	(50)
2018	FC Hallein 04	6	(0)
2019–2021	USK St. Koloman	28	(15)

International career
2007	Bosnia and Herzegovina XI	1	(0)
2008	Bosnia and Herzegovina	1	(0)
- * Club domestic league appearances and goals

Josip Lukačević (3 November 1983 – 23 October 2025) was a Bosnian professional footballer who played as a left midfielder.

== Club career ==
Lukačević spent the latter seasons in the Austrian amateur ranks.

== International career ==
Lukačević made his senior debut for Bosnia and Herzegovina in an unofficial match in 2007 against Poland. His sole official match was a June 2008 friendly against Azerbaijan in which he came on as a second-half substitute for Mladen Žižović.

== Death ==
Lukačević died in Salzburg, Austria on 23 October 2025, at the age of 41.
