= Ivan Ibriks =

Croatian footballer (born 1987)

Personal information
- Date of birth: 6 October 1987 (age 39)
- Place of birth: Suhopolje, SR Croatia, SFR Yugoslavia
- Height: 1.75 m (5 ft 9 in)
- Positions: Right back; midfielder

Youth career
- Suhopolje

Senior career*
Years	Team	Apps	(Gls)
2005	NK Pitomača	1	(1)
2005–2008	Suhopolje	131	(16)
2008–2013	Osijek	92	(2)
2013–2016	RNK Split	56	(2)
2016	Vinogradar	15	(0)
2017-2018	Busetina		
2018-2020	Suhopolje		
2020-	Podravac Sopje		
- * Club domestic league appearances and goals as of 9 July 2015

Ivan Ibriks (born 6 October 1987) is a Croatian football defender, currently playing for lower league side Podravac Sopje.
