= Ivo Smoje =

Croatian footballer

Personal information
- Full name: Ivo Smoje
- Date of birth: 21 November 1978 (age 47)
- Place of birth: Osijek, SFR Yugoslavia
- Height: 1.86 m (6 ft 1 in)

Team information
- Current team: Osijek (assistant)

Youth career
- –1992: Osijek
- 1993–1996: Olimpija Osijek
- 1996–1997: Osijek

Senior career*
Years	Team	Apps	(Gls)
1997–1999	NK Valpovka		
1999–2000	Grafičar		
2001–2002	Dinamo Zagreb	0	(0)
2001	→ Croatia Sesvete (loan)		
2004–2009	Osijek	103	(13)
2009–2010	Hajduk Split	4	(0)
2010–2014	Osijek	68	(5)

Managerial career
- 2018–: Osijek (assistant)
- 2023: Osijek (caretaker)
- * Club domestic league appearances and goals as of 29 June 2014

Ivo Smoje (born 21 November 1978) is a Croatian retired footballer who primarily played for hometown club Osijek.
