= Domagoj Pušić =

Croatian footballer (born 1991)

Personal information
- Date of birth: 24 October 1991 (age 35)
- Place of birth: Osijek, SFR Yugoslavia
- Height: 1.90 m (6 ft 3 in)
- Position: Central midfielder

Team information
- Current team: Terengganu
- Number: 8

Youth career
- Osijek

Senior career*
Years	Team	Apps	(Gls)
2008–2013	Osijek	75	(11)
2013–2015	Rijeka	3	(0)
2014–2015	→ Zadar (loan)	27	(4)
2015–2016	Lugano	17	(3)
2016–2019	Osijek	65	(14)
2016–2019	→ Osijek II	5	(1)
2019–2021	Sūduva	27	(5)
2021	Zrinjski Mostar	7	(2)
2021–2022	Cibalia	27	(7)
2022	BSK Bijelo Brdo	15	(1)
2023–	Terengganu	11	(0)

International career
2009	Croatia U18	7	(2)
2010	Croatia U19	2	(1)
2010	Croatia U20	1	(0)
- * Club domestic league appearances and goals as of 3 October 2021

Domagoj Pušić (born 24 October 1991) is a Croatian professional footballer who plays as a midfielder for Malaysia Super League side Terengganu.

== Club career ==
Pušić started his career playing at youth level for his hometown club Osijek, with whom he signed a professional three-year contract in July 2008. He made his debut for the first team in the fifth round of 2008–09 Prva HNL season against NK Zagreb on 24 August 2008, when he replaced Ivan Miličević for the final ten minutes of the match. He scored his first goal in Prva HNL the following season in a 3–1 victory over Istra 1961. On 15 January 2011, Pušić signed a two-and-a-half-year contract, extending his stay at Osijek until summer 2013.

In September 2013, Pušić signed a two-year contract with HNK Rijeka, with the possibility to extend the contract for another two years. In August 2014, he was loaned to NK Zadar until the end of the 2014–15 Prva HNL season. His contract with HNK Rijeka wasn't extended, and in June 2015 he became a free agent. On 1 October 2019, he became a member of Lithuanian side Sūduva, signing a contract lasting until the end of the 2020 season

n.

On 3 March 2021, Pušić signed a two-and-a-half-year contract with Bosnian Premier League club Zrinjski Mostar. He officially debuted for Zrinjski in a Bosnian Cup game against Sarajevo on 10 March 2021. Only three months after joining Zrinjski, Pušić left the club in June 2021.

On 3 January 2023, Pušić signed a one-year contract with Malaysia Super League club Terengganu FC.

== Honours ==
Rijeka

- Croatian Cup: 2013–14
- Croatian Super Cup: 2014

Sūduva

- A Lyga: 2019
