= NK Olimpija Osijek =

Croatian football club

NK Olimpija
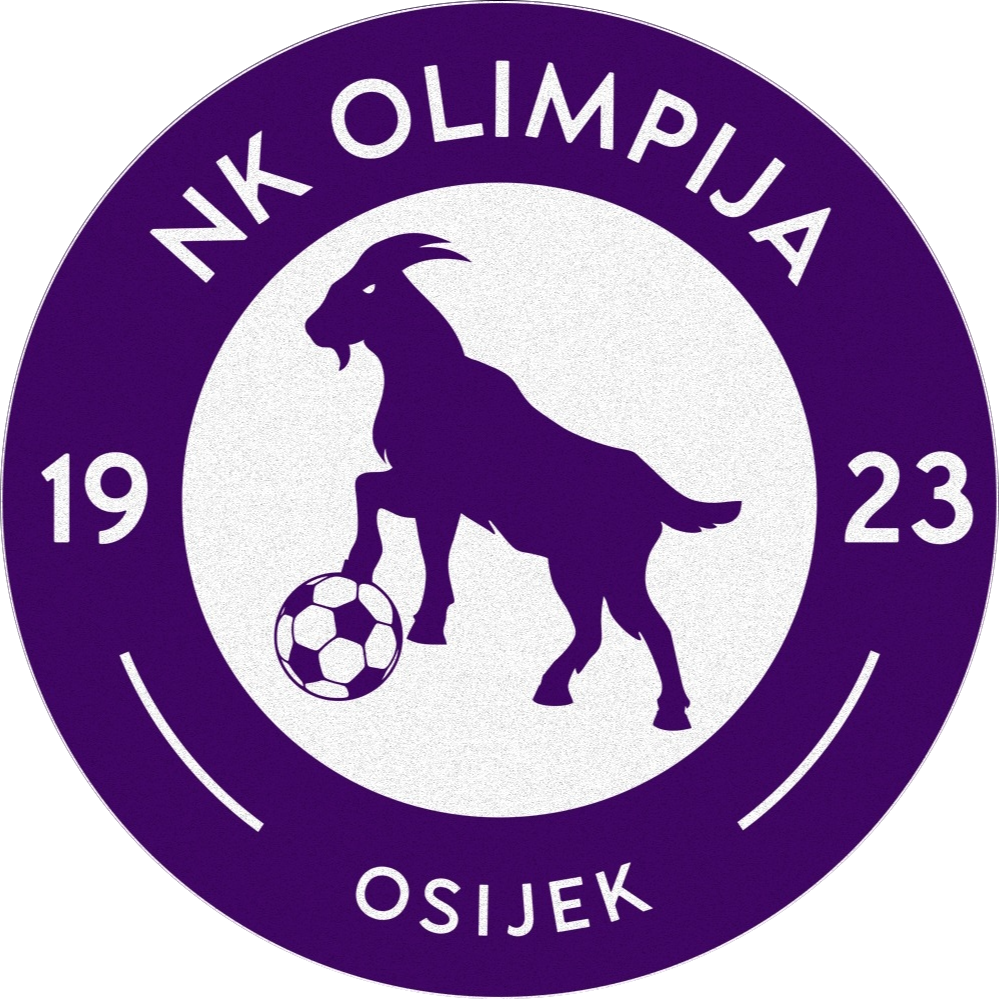
- Full name: NK Olimpija Osijek
- Founded: 1923
- Ground: Zeleno Polje
- Capacity: 2,000
- Manager: Vlado Bilić
- League: Treća HNL-East
Home colours	Away colours

NK Olimpija is a Croatian football club based in the city of Osijek.
