= Ivan Vargić =

Croatian footballer

Personal information
- Date of birth: 15 March 1987 (age 39)
- Place of birth: Osijek, SR Croatia, Yugoslavia
- Height: 1.92 m (6 ft 4 in)
- Position: Goalkeeper

Youth career
- Đakovo
- 2005–2006: Osijek

Senior career*
Years	Team	Apps	(Gls)
2006–2013	Osijek	36	(0)
2006–2007	→ Vukovar '91 (loan)	30	(0)
2008	→ Honka (loan)	0	(0)
2013–2016	Rijeka	95	(0)
2016–2020	Lazio	1	(0)
2018–2019	→ Anorthosis (loan)	10	(0)
2020–2021	Koper	30	(0)
2022–2024	Krk	35	(0)

International career
2006	Croatia U19	2	(0)
2007	Croatia U20	2	(0)
2007	Croatia U21	6	(0)
2014–2016	Croatia	3	(0)
- * Club domestic league appearances and goals as of 19:48, 14 February 2021 (UTC)

Ivan Vargić (Croatian pronunciation: [ǐʋan ʋâːrɡitɕ]; born 15 March 1987) is a Croatian former footballer who last played as a goalkeeper for Krk. He had played for Slovenian club FC Koper in the years before returning to Croatia.

== Club career ==
=== Osijek ===
Following two loans to HNK Vukovar '91 in Croatia's 2. HNL and FC Honka in Finland's Veikkausliiga, Vargić made his debut with NK Osijek in 1. HNL in April 2009. He earned 36 league caps before he left the club in 2013.

=== Rijeka ===
On 5 February 2013, HNK Rijeka announced that they have signed Vargić on a 4 1/2-year contract. During the 2015–16 1. HNL season, Vargić broke two Rijeka records: the longest streak without conceding a goal and goalkeeper who kept most clean sheets in one season. From 2 August 2015 to 4 October 2015, he did not concede a goal for 783 consecutive minutes, which is the second longest streak in the history of 1. HNL. During the 2015–16 1. HNL season, he conceded only 13 goals in 32 appearances, keeping 21 clean sheets. With 23 appearances, Vargić is also the club's most capped goalkeeper in Europe.

=== Lazio and loans ===
On 1 February 2016, both Croatian and Italian press reported that Lazio have signed Vargić for a fee of €2.7 million. Lazio immediately sent Vargić on loan to Rijeka until 30 June 2016.

On 3 September 2018, Vargić joined Cypriot club Anorthosis Famagusta on a season-long loan.

On 6 February 2020, he joined Koper in Slovenia on loan until the end of the 2019–20 season. Koper activated buyout clause and he stayed in the club until June 2021.

=== Return to Croatia ===
After spending two seasons in 3rd-tier Croatian club Krk, he retired from professional football in June 2024.

== International career ==
Vargić was a member of Croatia under-21 national team. On 12 November 2014, he made his senior national team debut in a friendly game against Argentina, entering as a substitute for Lovre Kalinić. Vargić went on to cap his national side for two more times, and the last match of his national career being against Northern Ireland in 2016.

== Honours ==
Rijeka

- Croatian Cup: 2014
- Croatian Super Cup: 2014

Lazio

- Supercoppa Italiana: 2017
