= 2012–13 HNK Cibalia season =

Cibalia
2012–13 season
- Chairman: Željko Šarčević
- Manager: Samir Toplak (until 27 July 2012); Željko Kopić (from 28 July 2012 to 25 November 2012); Miroslav Bojko (from 25 November 2012)
- Prva HNL: 11th
- Croatian Cup: Semi-finals
- Top goalscorer: League: Tomislav Mazalović (5); All: Mladen Bartolović (6)

This article shows statistics of individual players for the Cibalia football club. It also lists all matches that Cibalia played in the 2012–13 season.

Cibalia finished 11th in the final league standings.

== First-team squad ==
As of 22 October 2012

Note: Flags indicate national team as defined under FIFA eligibility rules; some limited exceptions apply. Players may hold more than one non-FIFA nationality.

No.	Pos.	Nation	Player
1	GK	CRO	Mladen Matković
2	DF	CRO	Josip Gegić
3	MF	CRO	Petar Mišić
4	MF	CRO	Marin Matoš
5	DF	CRO	Mario Lučić
7	MF	CRO	Luka Muženjak
8	FW	CRO	Jakov Puljić
9	FW	CRO	Ivan Koledić
10	FW	CRO	Tomislav Pavličić
11	FW	BIH	Mladen Bartolović
12	GK	CRO	Michael Paradžiković
13	DF	CRO	Dario Župarić
14	DF	CRO	Tomislav Jonjić

No.	Pos.	Nation	Player
15	DF	CRO	Matej Mitrović
16	FW	CRO	Niko Tokić
17	DF	CRO	Stjepan Šimičić
18	FW	CRO	Drago Ćorić
19	FW	CRO	Petar Filipović
21	MF	CRO	Tomislav Jurić
22	MF	CRO	Frane Vitaić
23	GK	CRO	Ivan Filipović
24	DF	CRO	Dario Rugašević
25	MF	CRO	Marko Čulić
26	FW	CRO	Marko Terzić
28	MF	CRO	Tomislav Mazalović

== Competitions ==
=== Overall ===
Competition	Started round	Final result	First match	Last Match
2012–13 Prva HNL	–	TBD	22 July 2012	26 May 2013
2012–13 Croatian Cup	First round	TBD	26 September 2012	TBD

=== Prva HNL ===
==== Classification ====
Pos	Team	Pld	W	D	L	GF	GA	GD	Pts	Qualification or relegation
8	Slaven Belupo	33	10	9	14	35	50	−15	39	
9	Zadar	33	9	9	15	39	61	−22	36	
10	Inter Zaprešić (R)	33	8	11	14	36	41	−5	35	Relegation to Croatian Second Football League
11	Cibalia (R)	33	9	5	19	29	44	−15	32	Relegation to Croatian Second Football League
12	NK Zagreb (R)	33	7	6	20	28	60	−32	27	Relegation to Croatian Second Football League

Source: Sportnet.hr
Rules for classification: 1) points; 2) goal difference; 3) number of goals scored.
For deciding champions, qualification to UEFA Europa League and relegation: 1st points; 2nd head-to-head points; 3rd head-to-head goal difference; 4th head-to-head away goals scored
(R) Relegated

==== Results summary ====
Overall								Home						Away					
Pld	W	D	L	GF	GA	GD	Pts	W	D	L	GF	GA	GD	W	D	L	GF	GA	GD
33	9	5	19	29	44	−15	32	6	3	7	18	18	0	3	2	12	11	26	−15

Last updated: 26 May 2013.
Source: Sportnet.hr

==== Results by round ====
Round	1	2	3	4	5	6	7	8	9	10	11	12	13	14	15	16	17	18	19	20	21	22	23	24	25	26	27	28	29	30	31	32	33
Ground	H	A	H	H	A	H	A	H	A	H	A	A	H	A	A	H	A	H	A	H	A	H	A	H	A	H	A	H	A	H	A	H	A
Result	L	L	D	L	L	D	W	W	L	W	L	L	D	L	L	W	L	D	L	W	D	L	W	L	L	W	L	L	L	L	W	W	L
Position	12	12	11	11	11	11	10	9	10	9	10	10	10	10	10	10	10	10	11	11	12	12	10	10	11	11	11	11	11	11	11	11	11

Source: Competitive matches
A = Away; H = Home; W = Win; D = Draw; L = Loss

== Matches ==
=== Prva HNL ===
22 July 2012 Match 1	Cibalia	0–3	Slaven Belupo	Vinkovci
19:00 CET	Vitaić (yellow card) 82'; Jakov Puljić (yellow card) 84'	Report (in Croatian)	Bubnjić (yellow card) 11' (goal) 13'; Čanađija (yellow card) 52'; Rak 64', 87'; Kokalović (yellow card) 79'	Stadium: Stadion HNK Cibalia; Attendance: 1,000; Referee: Damir Batinić (Osijek)

28 July 2012 Match 2	Dinamo Zagreb	2–1	Cibalia	Zagreb
21:00 CET	Leko 32' (pen.) (yellow card) 66'; Čop 62'	Report (in Croatian)	Bartolović 67'; Vitaić (yellow card) 75'	Stadium: Stadion Maksimir; Attendance: 3,000; Referee: Zlatko Šimčić (Koprivnica)

4 August 2012 Match 3	Cibalia	1–1	Inter Zaprešić	Vinkovci
20:00 CET	Župarić (yellow card) 18'; Pavličić (yellow card) 50'; Puljić 59'; Rugašević (yellow card) 73'	Report (in Croatian)	Mlinar (yellow card) 9'; Čeliković (yellow card) 10'; Batur (yellow card) 24'; Šarić 57' (pen.); Santini (yellow card) 90+4'	Stadium: Stadion HNK Cibalia; Attendance: 800; Referee: Domagoj Vučkov (Rijeka)

11 August 2012 Match 4	Cibalia	0–1	Istra 1961	Vinkovci
20:00 CET	Pavličić (yellow card) 27'; Puljić (yellow card) 39'; Bartolović (yellow card) 67'; Gegić (yellow card) 75' (yellow-red card) 79'	Report (in Croatian)	Budicin (yellow card) 33'; Prgomet (yellow card) 40'; Križman 46'	Stadium: Stadion HNK Cibalia; Attendance: 700; Referee: Danijel Trampus (Osijek)

18 August 2012 Match 5	RNK Split	3–1	Cibalia	Split
20:00 CET	Pehar (yellow card) 45+10' (goal) 79'; Vitaić 45+14', 48'	Report (in Croatian)	Bartolović 45+7'; Mazalović (yellow card) 70'	Stadium: Stadion Park mladeži Attendance: 500; Referee: Lukša Klaić (Čilipi)

18 August 2012 Match 6	Cibalia	0–0	Zadar	Vinkovci
20:00 CET		Report (in Croatian)	Prahić (yellow card) 50'; Rašo (yellow card) 90+2'	Stadium: Stadion HNK Cibalia; Attendance: 800; Referee: Duje Strukan (Split)

31 August 2012 Match 7	NK Zagreb	0–1	Cibalia	Zagreb
19:00 CET	Štrok (yellow card) 55'	Report (in Croatian)	Župarić (yellow card) 27'; Rugašević (yellow card) 37'; Vitaić 56'	Stadium: Stadion Kranjčevićeva; Attendance: 500; Referee: Damir Batinić (Osijek)

15 September 2012 Match 8	Cibalia	3–2	Lokomotiva	Vinkovci
19:00 CET	Bartolović 41'; Vitaić (yellow card) 49'; Rugašević (yellow card) 63'; Mazalović 66', 90' (yellow card) 79'; Jonjić (yellow card) 85'	Report (in Croatian)	Zakarić (yellow card) 31'; Kramarić 32', 84' (pen.); Barbarić (yellow card) 57' (yellow-red card); Lovrić (yellow card) 82'; Trebotić (yellow card) 82'	Stadium: Stadion HNK Cibalia; Attendance: 800; Referee: Marko Matoc (Zaprešić)

22 September 2012 Match 9	Osijek	1–0	Cibalia	Osijek
15:00 CET	Ibriks 77' (yellow card) 77'; Perošević (yellow card) 79'; Aleksić (yellow card) 85'	Report (in Croatian)	Mazalović (yellow card) 20'	Stadium: Stadion Gradski vrt Attendance: 2,000; Referee: Igor Pristovnik (Zagreb)

29 September 2012 Match 10	Cibalia	4–1	Rijeka	Vinkovci
15:30 CET	Neretljak 4' (o.g.); Paradžiković (yellow card) 5'; Matoš 17', 25' (pen.); Mišić (yellow card) 29'; Bartolović (yellow card) 77'; Marko Terzić 80' (yellow card) 81'; Muženjak (yellow card) 84'	Report (in Croatian)	Knežević (yellow card) 25'; Datković (yellow card) 53'; Brezovec 56'	Stadium: Stadion HNK Cibalia; Attendance: 1,500; Referee: Goran Gabrilo (Split)

5 October 2012 Match 11	Hajduk Split	4–0	Cibalia	Split
19:00 CET	Vuković 23' (pen.) 50' (pen.); Radošević (yellow card) 42'; Caktaš 73'; Milić 86'	Report (in Croatian)	Muženjak (yellow card) 44'; Terzić (yellow card) 49'	Stadium: Stadion Poljud; Attendance: 7,000; Referee: Igor Pristovnik (Zagreb)

20 October 2012 Match 12	Slaven Belupo	2–1	Cibalia	Koprivnica
18:00 CET	Vugrinec 6' (pen.), 90+2'; Pilipović (yellow card) 7'; Kokalović (yellow card) 33'	Report (in Croatian)	Matoš 34' (pen.); Vitaić (yellow card) 41'; Bartolović (yellow card) 58'; Ćorić 90'	Stadium: Gradski stadion Attendance: 1,800; Referee: Dalibor Mlakar (Zagreb)

27 October 2012 Match 13	Cibalia	0–1	Dinamo Zagreb	Vinkovci
15:00 CET	Mazalović (yellow card) 33'	Report (in Croatian)	Ibáñez (yellow card) 33'; Krstanović 76'	Stadium: Stadion HNK Cibalia; Attendance: 3,500; Referee: Ivan Bebek (Rijeka)

3 November 2012 Match 14	Inter Zaprešić	0–0	Cibalia	Zaprešić
15:00 CET	Milardović (yellow card) 45'; Ščrbec (yellow card) 58'	Report (in Croatian)	Bartolović (yellow card) 11'; Rugašević (yellow card) 22'; Mazalović (yellow card) 42'; Župarić (yellow card) 59'; Luka Muženjak (yellow card) 70'	Stadium: Stadion ŠRC Zaprešić; Attendance: 1,000; Referee: Fran Jović (Zagreb)

10 November 2012 Match 15	Istra 1961	3–0	Cibalia	Pula
15:00 CET	Roce 34'; Aganović 44', 86'	Report (in Croatian)	Jonjić (yellow card) 57' (yellow-red card)	Stadium: Stadion Aldo Drosina; Attendance: 2,000; Referee: Domagoj Ljubičić (Osijek)

17 November 2012 Match 16	Cibalia	2–1	RNK Split	Vinkovci
15:00 CET	Mazalović 18' (pen.); P. Filipović 55'; Muženjak (yellow card) 57'	Report (in Croatian)	Baraban 7'; Belle (yellow card) 17'; Glumac (red card) 17'; Pehar (yellow card) 28'; Rebić (yellow card) 38'; Radeljić (yellow card) 89'	Stadium: Stadion HNK Cibalia; Attendance: 700; Referee: Fran Jović (Zagreb)

24 November 2012 Match 17	Zadar	4–1	Cibalia	Zadar
15:00 CET	Prahić (yellow card) 14'; Mršić 17'; Banović (yellow card) 45'; Perica 48', 87'; Begonja 90'	Report (in Croatian)	Tokić (yellow card) 3'; P. Filipović (yellow card) 63' (yellow-red card); Heister 67' (o.g.)	Stadium: Stadion Stanovi; Attendance: 500; Referee: Igor Križarić (Čakovec)

1 December 2012 Match 18	Cibalia	1–1	Zagreb	Vinkovci
15:00 CET	Mišić 47'; Rugašević (yellow card) 57'; Mazalović (yellow card) 70'	Report (in Croatian)	Šovšić (yellow card) 27'; Medić (yellow card) 73' (goal) 83'; Kolinger (yellow card) 74'; Pavlović (yellow card) 17'	Stadium: Stadion HNK Cibalia; Attendance: 1,000; Referee: Zlatko Šimčić (Koprivnica)

7 December 2012 Match 19	Lokomotiva	1–0	Cibalia	Zagreb
16:00 CET	Barbarić (yellow card) 38'; Antolić 82'	Report (in Croatian)	Puljić (yellow card) 89'	Stadium: Stadion Maksimir; Attendance: 200; Referee: Domagoj Ljubičić (Osijek)

16 February 2013 Match 20	Cibalia	2–0	Osijek	Vinkovci
15:00 CET	Mazalović 18' (pen.), 58' (pen.); Vitaić (yellow card) 34'; Kurtović (yellow card) 26'; P. Filipović (yellow card) 80'; Miloš (yellow card) 90'	Report (in Croatian)	Mikulić (yellow card) 18'; Kurtović (yellow card) 26'; Smoje (yellow card) 35'; Pušić (yellow card) 59'; Perošević (red card) 77'	Stadium: Stadion HNK Cibalia; Attendance: 1,000; Referee: Igor Križarić (Čakovec)

23 February 2013 Match 21	Rijeka	0–0	Cibalia	Rijeka
18:00 CET	Knežević (yellow card) 17'; Čaval (yellow card) 35'	Summary	Tomislav Mazalović (yellow card) 52'; Mladen Matković (yellow card) 90'	Stadium: Stadion Kantrida; Attendance: 1,000; Referee: Marin Vidulin

2 March 2013 Match 22	Cibalia	0–2	Hajduk Split	Vinkovci
15:00 CET	Župarić (yellow card) 34'; Petar Mišić (yellow card) 55'	Summary	Maglica 3', 52' (yellow card) 42'; Zoran Plazonić (yellow card) 53'; Milić (yellow card) 62'; Sušić (yellow card) 88'	Stadium: Stadion HNK Cibalia; Attendance: 5,500; Referee: Marijo Strahonja

9 March 2013 Match 23	Slaven Belupo	0–2	Cibalia	Koprivnica
15:00 CET	Maras (yellow card) 6' (yellow-red card); Bubnjić (yellow card) 62'	Summary	Tomislav Mazalović 26' (pen.) (yellow card) 40'; Petar Mišić 35'; Stjepan Šimičić (yellow card) 49'	Stadium: Gradski stadion Attendance: 1,200; Referee: Igor Pristovnik

16 March 2013 Match 24	Cibalia	0–1	Rijeka	Vinkovci
15:00 CET	Bartolović (yellow card) 77'	Summary	Benko 17'; Alispahić (yellow card) 37'	Stadium: Stadion HNK Cibalia; Attendance: 1,500; Referee: Dalibor Mlakar

30 March 2013 Match 25	RNK Split	1–0	Cibalia	Split
15:00 CET	Erceg 4' (yellow card) 55'; Hrgović (yellow card) 59'; Paracki (yellow card) 74'; Križanac (yellow card) 89'	Summary	Župarić (yellow card) 15'; Bartolović (yellow card) 86'	Stadium: Stadion Park mladeži Attendance: 400; Referee: Igor Križarić

6 April 2013 Match 26	Cibalia	2–0	Lokomotiva	Vinkovci
16:00 CET	Tomislav Mazalović 20' (pen.); Filipović (yellow card) 32' (goal) 62'; Marko Terzić (yellow card) 57'; Rugašević (yellow card) 81'	Summary	Picak (yellow card) 19'; Chago (yellow card) 51'; Šitum (yellow card) 52'; Mrzljak (yellow card) 88'	Stadium: Stadion HNK Cibalia; Attendance: 700; Referee: Bruno Marić

13 April 2013 Match 27	Hajduk Split	2–1	Cibalia	Split
19:00 CET	Caktaš 27' (yellow card) 71'; Stojanović (yellow card) 41'; Maloča (yellow card) 58'; Vuković 79'; Kiš (yellow card) 81'	Summary	Bartolović 39'; Petar Mišić (yellow card) 46' (yellow-red card); Mladen Matković (yellow card) 69'; Luka Muženjak (yellow card) 87'	Stadium: Stadion Poljud; Attendance: 5,000; Referee: Fran Jović

20 April 2013 Match 28	Cibalia	0–1	Dinamo Zagreb	Vinkovci
15:00 CET	Mato Miloš (yellow card) 28'; Rugašević (yellow card) 29'; Tomislav Mazalović (yellow card) 32'; Vitaić (yellow card) 74'	Summary	Jedvaj 19'; Bećiraj (yellow card) 28'; Tomečak (yellow card) 41'	Stadium: Stadion HNK Cibalia; Attendance: 3,000; Referee: Ante Vučemilović

27 April 2013 Match 29	Istra 1961	2–1	Cibalia	Pula
19:00 CET	Milić 52'; Križman 76'	Summary	Drago Ćorić (yellow card) 21'; Pavličić (yellow card) 42'; Bartolović 69'; Marko Terzić (yellow card) 81'	Stadium: Stadion Aldo Drosina; Attendance: 1,500; Referee: Igor Križarić

4 May 2013 Match 30	Cibalia	2–3	Zadar	Vinkovci
17:00 CET	Matoš (yellow card) 7'; Vitaić 25', 76'	Summary	Josip Ivančić 8' (yellow card) 8'; Jerbić (yellow card) 28'; Domagoj Muić 30'; Heister (yellow card) 45'; Igor Banović 46' (yellow card) 90'; Bilaver (yellow card) 64'; Buljat (yellow card) 87'; Gluić (yellow card) 90'; Antonio Mršić (yellow card) 90'; Ivan Tokić (yellow card) 90'	Stadium: Stadion HNK Cibalia; Attendance: 1,000; Referee: (Croatia) Damir Batinić

10 May 2013 Match 31	Zagreb	0–2	Cibalia	Zagreb
18:00 CET	Denis Kolinger (yellow card) 26' (yellow-red card); Ante Mitrović (yellow card) 89'	Summary	Jakov Puljić (yellow card) 56'; Rugašević (yellow card) 61'; Frane Vitaić 75' (pen.); Marko Terzić 80'	Stadium: Stadion Kranjčevićeva; Attendance: 800; Referee: (Croatia) Domagoj Vučkov

18 May 2013 Match 32	Cibalia	1–0	Inter Zaprešić	Vinkovci
19:00 CET	Vitaić 12' (pen.) (yellow card) 62'; Mladen Matković (red card) 18'; Petar Mišić (yellow card) 30'; Rugašević (yellow card) 34'; Pavličić (yellow card) 45'; Filipović (yellow card) 75'; Marin Matoš (yellow card) 85'; Paradžiković (yellow card) 86'	Summary	Milnar (yellow card) 31'; Šarić (yellow card) 34'; Hrvoje Plazanić (yellow card) 88'	Stadium: Stadion HNK Cibalia; Attendance: 1,800; Referee: (Croatia) Ivan Bebek

26 May 2013 Match 33	Osijek	1–0	Cibalia	Osijek
19:00 CET	Perošević 33' (yellow card) 68'	Summary	Luka Muženjak (yellow card) 86'	Stadium: Stadion Gradski vrt Attendance: 1,000; Referee: (Croatia) Dalibor Mlakar

=== Croatian Cup ===
26 September 2012 Round 1	Vinodol	0–2	Cibalia	Novi Vinodolski
15:30		Report (in Croatian)	Bartolović 18'; Rugašević (yellow card) 85'; Vitaić 90'	Stadium: SRC Bahalin; Attendance: 700; Referee: Marin Vidulin (Kanfanar)

31 October 2012 Round 2	Cibalia	1–0	Gorica	Vinkovci
17:00	Matoš 54' (pen.) (yellow card) 71'; Rugašević (yellow card) 78'	Report (in Croatian)	Grgurović (yellow card) 36'; Čunčić (yellow card) 53'; Milanović (yellow card) 61'; Abramović (yellow card) 69'; Crnov (yellow card) 70' (yellow-red card)	Stadium: Stadion HNK Cibalia; Attendance: 400; Referee: Domagoj Ljubičić (Osijek)

21 November 2012 Quarter-Final; First leg	Cibalia	1–1	Osijek	Vinkovci
17:00	Mazalović (yellow card) 21'; Bartolović (yellow card) 48' (goal) 63'; Rugašević (yellow card) 66'	Report (in Croatian)	Zubak (yellow card) 15'; Aleksić (yellow card) 37'; Lešković 66'	Stadium: Stadion HNK Cibalia; Attendance: 2,000; Referee: Igor Križarić (Čakovec)

28 November 2012 Quarter-Final; Second Leg	Osijek	1–3 (2–4 agg.)	Cibalia	Osijek
17:00	Lešković 51' (yellow card) 52'; Vrgoč (yellow card) 81'; Mišić (yellow card) 5'	Report (in Croatian)	Koledić 1'; Pavličić (yellow card) 5'; Puljić (yellow card) 5' (goal) 53'; Jonjić (yellow card) 39'; Bartolović (yellow card) 69' (goal) 90+1'	Stadium: Stadion Gradski vrt Attendance: 4,000; Referee: Zlatko Šimčić (Koprivnica)

3 April 2013 Semi-Final; First Leg	Cibalia	1–1	Lokomotiva	Vinkovci
17:00	Tomislav Mazalović 23' (yellow card) 53'; Vitaić (yellow card) 85'	Summary	Kramarić 58'; Mrzljak (yellow card) 86'; Tomislav Martinac (yellow card) 90'	Stadium: Stadion HNK Cibalia; Attendance: 1,000; Referee: Marko Matoc

17 April 2013 Semi-Final; Second Leg	Lokomotiva	3–0 (4–1 agg.)	Cibalia	Zagreb
19:00	Šitum 19'; Antolić 43'; Musa (yellow card) 81'; Kramarić 89'	Summary	Tomislav Mazalović (yellow card) 31'	Stadium: Stadion Maksimir; Attendance: 600; Referee: Zlatko Šimčić

Sources: Prva-HNL.hr

== Player seasonal records ==
Competitive matches only. Updated to games played 8 December 2012.

=== Top scorers ===
Rank	Name	League	Cup	Total
1	(Bosnia and Herzegovina) Mladen Bartolović	3	3	6
2	(Croatia) Tomislav Mazalović	5	–	5
3	(Croatia) Marin Matoš	3	1	4
4	(Croatia) Jakov Puljić	1	1	2
4	(Croatia) Frane Vitaić	1	1	2
6	(Croatia) Petar Filipović	1	–	1
6	(Croatia) Ivan Koledić	–	1	1
6	(Croatia) Petar Mišić	1	–	1
6	(Croatia) Marko Terzić	1	–	1
	Own goals	2	–	2
	TOTALS	18	7	25

Source: Competitive matches
