= Slavonian derby =

Football rivalry in Croatia

Slavonian Derby
- Other names: Slavonski derbi
- Location: Osijek and Vinkovci, Croatia
- Teams: Osijek and Cibalia
- First meeting: 14 March 1992 (Prva HNL)
- Latest meeting: Osijek 3–1 Cibalia (9 May 2018)
- Next meeting: N/A

Statistics
- Total meetings: 73 (63 league)
- Most wins: Osijek (31)
- Most player appearances: Bakir Beširević (22)
- Top scorer: Josip Barišić (6)

Slavonian derby (Croatian: Slavonski derbi) is the name given to matches between the two most successful Croatian football clubs from the eastern Croatian region of Slavonia, the Osijek-based NK Osijek and Vinkovci-based HNK Cibalia. As of May 2018, since Croatian independence the derby was played 63 times, of which 53 in 1. HNL and 10 in the Croatian Cup. In former Yugoslavia, the two clubs played 30 derbies, including 10 in the Yugoslav First League (1982 to 1987) and 20 in the Yugoslav Second League. The teams are supported by their fanbases called Kohorta and Ultrasi, at times engaging in hooliganism at the time of the derby.

== Results ==
Competition	Played	Osijek wins	Draws	Cibalia wins	Osijek goals	Cibalia goals
Yugoslav championship (1982–1987)
First League	10	3	3	4	13	18
Croatian championship (1992–2013)
Prva HNL	53	25	14	14	78	55
Croatian Cup	10	3	2	5	14	12
Croatia totals	63	28	16	19	92	67
Total	73	31	19	23	105	85

Last updated on 9 May 2018.

== List of matches ==
=== Key ===
Match ended in a draw
Osijek win
Cibalia win

=== 1982–1987 (Yugoslav First League) ===
M	Date	Competition	Ground	Score	Osijek scorers	Dinamo Vinkovci scorers
1	24 Oct 1982	1. Div	Mladosti	3–0		Halilović, Rajović, Tunjić
2	22 May 1983	1. Div	Gradski vrt	4–2	Rakela, Todorović, Lepinjica, o.g.	N. Lušić, Šećer
3	4 Dec 1983	1. Div	Gradski vrt	1–0	Karačić	
4	30 May 1984	1. Div	Mladosti	2–2	Špoljarić, Džeko	N. Lušić, Rajović
5	19 Aug 1984	1. Div	Gradski vrt	1–1	Rakela	Leketić
6	17 Feb 1985	1. Div	Mladosti	1–0		Zahirović
7	27 Oct 1985	1. Div	Mladosti	4–0		Bogdanović, Čop (2), Zahirović
8	25 May 1986	1. Div	Gradski vrt	3–2	Redžepagić, Karačić (2)	Čop, Berecko
9	21 Sep 1986	1. Div	Gradski vrt	2–3	Kasalo, Šuker	S. Lušić, Bogdanović, Urošević
10	5 April 1987	1. Div	Mladosti	0–0		

=== 1992–present (Prva HNL and Croatian Cup) ===
M	Date	Competition	Ground	Score	Osijek scorers	Cibalia scorers	Attendance	Report
1	14 Mar 1992	1. HNL	NK Đakovo	1–1	Bjelica	G. Meštrović	1,000	HRnogomet.com
2	9 May 1992	1. HNL	NK Kutjevo	2–1	Petrović, Labak	Plavšić	1,000	HRnogomet.com
3	29 Nov 1992	1. HNL	HNK Cibalia	1–0		Lončarević	8,000	HRnogomet.com
4	13 Jun 1993	1. HNL	Gradski vrt	2–0	Petrović, Osmanagić		1,000	HRnogomet.com
5	2 Oct 1993	1. HNL	HNK Cibalia	1–1	Plavšić	Čop	2,000	HRnogomet.com
6	10 Apr 1994	1. HNL	Gradski vrt	1–1	Katić	Jurković	6,000	HRnogomet.com
7	25 Sep 1994	1. HNL	Gradski vrt	1–1	Špehar	Bogdan	8,000	HRnogomet.com
8	9 Apr 1995	1. HNL	HNK Cibalia	1–2	Bičanić, Špehar	Šimunec	2,500	HRnogomet.com
9	10 Sep 1995	1. HNL	HNK Cibalia	2–0		Bogdan, Ribić	2,500	HRnogomet.com
10	11 Oct 1995	Cup	HNK Cibalia	1–0		Bogdan	500	HRnogomet.com
11	25 Oct 1995	Cup	Gradski vrt	4–0	Zgrablić, Krpan, Vukoja, Sunara		3,000	HRnogomet.com
12	19 Nov 1995	1. HNL	Gradski vrt	4–0	Vukoja, Šimunec, Beljan, Krpan		5,000	HRnogomet.com
13	22 Sep 1996	1. HNL	Gradski vrt	1–2	Grnja	Andričević, Jurković	1,500	HRnogomet.com
14	13 Apr 1997	1. HNL	HNK Cibalia	1–2	Vuica, Rendulić	Marinčić	1,000	HRnogomet.com
15	18 Oct 1998	1. HNL	HNK Cibalia	1–0		Jurčec	2,500	HRnogomet.com
16	7 Mar 1999	1. HNL	Gradski vrt	3–1	Prišć, Balatinac, Beširević	Čutura	2,000	HRnogomet.com
17	30 May 1999	Cup	Maksimir	2–1 (asdet)	Mitu, Lasić	J. Jurić	5,000	HRnogomet.com
18	19 Sep 1999	1. HNL	HNK Cibalia	2–3	Balatinac, Vranješ, Grnja	Bošnjak (2)	3,000	HRnogomet.com
19	19 Feb 2000	1. HNL	Gradski vrt	1–1	Bjelica	Bartolović	2,500	HRnogomet.com
20	14 Mar 2000	Cup	HNK Cibalia	2–1	Pernar (o.g.)	Bošnjak, Pernar	700	HRnogomet.com
21	21 Mar 2000	Cup	Gradski vrt	0–0			1,500	HRnogomet.com
22	11 Apr 2000	1. HNL	Gradski vrt	3–0	Balatinac, Zdrilić (2)		2,000	HRnogomet.com
23	19 Aug 2000	1. HNL	Cibalia	1–1	Bjelica	M. Meštrović	500	HRnogomet.com
24	12 Nov 2000	1. HNL	Gradski vrt	3–0	Vuka, Bjelica, Zdrilić		2,500	HRnogomet.com
25	17 Nov 2001	1. HNL	HNK Cibalia	1–0		Tkalčević	500	HRnogomet.com
26	4 May 2002	1. HNL	Gradski vrt	0–0			1,500	HRnogomet.com
27	19 Oct 2002	1. HNL	HNK Cibalia	3–1	Popović	Lučić, Bartolović, Žgela	1,200	HRnogomet.com
28	22 Mar 2003	1. HNL	Gradski vrt	1–0	Ljubojević		1,500	HRnogomet.com
29	3 Aug 2003	1. HNL	HNK Cibalia	3–2	Špehar, Ljubojević	Ratković, Peraica, Ćorić	2,000	HRnogomet.com
30	2 Nov 2003	1. HNL	Gradski vrt	2–1	Mikulić, Ljubojević	Peraica	1,000	HRnogomet.com
31	15 Oct 2005	1. HNL	HNK Cibalia	3–1	Smoje	Križanović, Prijić, Stojanovski	3,000	HRnogomet.com
32	11 Mar 2006	1. HNL	Gradski vrt	1–1	Barišić	K. Knežević	3,000	HRnogomet.com
33	19 Aug 2006	1. HNL	Gradski vrt	3–1	Mostarlić, Milardović, Barišić	Zekić	2,000	HRnogomet.com
34	11 Nov 2006	1. HNL	HNK Cibalia	3–0		Zekić (3)	1,500	HRnogomet.com
35	28 Apr 2007	1. HNL	Gradski vrt	2–2	Nikšić, M. Pavličić	Kerić, Kresinger	2,000	HRnogomet.com
36	15 Sep 2007	1. HNL	HNK Cibalia	2–0		Dodik (2)	2,000	HRnogomet.com
37	23 Oct 2007	Cup	HNK Cibalia	2–1	Hrnčević	Radotić, Kerić	400	HRnogomet.com
38	8 Dec 2007	1. HNL	Gradski vrt	5–1	Nikšić (2), Jukić (2), Hrnčević	Husić	1,000	HRnogomet.com
39	19 Mar 2008	1. HNL	Gradski vrt	2–1	Smoje, Radas (o.g.)	Malčić	1,500	HRnogomet.com
40	3 Aug 2008	1. HNL	Gradski vrt	2–0	Miličević, Babić		3,500	HRnogomet.com
41	2 Nov 2008	1. HNL	HNK Cibalia	0–3	Smoje, Barišić (2)		3,000	HRnogomet.com
42	19 Apr 2009	1. HNL	HNK Cibalia	1–1	Vida	Malčić	2,500	HRnogomet.com
43	21 Nov 2009	1. HNL	HNK Cibalia	1–1	Barišić	T. Pavličić	3,000	HRnogomet.com
44	13 May 2010	1. HNL	Gradski vrt	2–0	Vidaković, Miličević		2,500	HRnogomet.com
45	25 Jul 2010	1. HNL	HNK Cibalia	3–0		Bartolović, Parmaković, T. Jurić	2,000	HRnogomet.com
46	20 Nov 2010	1. HNL	Gradski vrt	1–0	Maglica		2,000	HRnogomet.com
47	27 Aug 2011	1. HNL	HNK Cibalia	0–1	Vidaković		2,500	HRnogomet.com
48	11 Mar 2012	1. HNL	Gradski vrt	1–2	Perošević	Koledić, Župarić	1,500	HRnogomet.com
49	3 Apr 2012	Cup	Gradski vrt	3–0	Maglica (2), Vrgoč		4,000	HRnogomet.com
50	18 Apr 2012	Cup	HNK Cibalia	2–1	Šorša	Vitaić, Tomić	3,000	HRnogomet.com
51	22 Sep 2012	1. HNL	Gradski vrt	1–0	Ibriks		2,000	HRnogomet.com
52	21 Nov 2012	Cup	HNK Cibalia	1–1	Lešković	Bartolović	2,000	HRnogomet.com
53	27 Nov 2012	Cup	Gradski vrt	1–3	Lešković	Koledić, Puljić, Bartolović	5,000	HRnogomet.com
54	16 Feb 2013	1. HNL	HNK Cibalia	2–0		Mazalović (2)	1,000	HRnogomet.com
55	26 May 2013	1. HNL	Gradski vrt	1–0	Perošević		1,000	HRnogomet.com
56	27 Aug 2016	1. HNL	Gradski vrt	2–0	Mioč, J. Knežević		4,451	prvahnl.hr
57	20 Nov 2016	1. HNL	HNK Cibalia	0–2	Ejupi, Boban		1,732	prvahnl.hr
58	18 Mar 2017	1. HNL	Gradski vrt	2–0	Lyopa (2)		2,356	prvahnl.hr
59	16 May 2017	1. HNL	HNK Cibalia	1–1	J. Knežević	Vitaić	2,120	prvahnl.hr
60	27 Aug 2017	1. HNL	HNK Cibalia	2–1	Perošević	Pervan, Galić	2,180	prvahnl.hr
61	18 Nov 2017	1. HNL	Gradski vrt	1–1	Marić	Kordić	2,227	prvahnl.hr
62	11 Mar 2018	1. HNL	HNK Cibalia	1–1	Hajradinović	Galić	1,360	prvahnl.hr
63	9 May 2018	1. HNL	Gradski vrt	3–1	Marić, Hajradinović, Bočkaj	Barišić	2,856	prvahnl.hr

Note: Home team's score always shown first

== Top scorers ==
This is the list of top scoring players in the derby since 1982. Data updated up to the last derby played on 9 May 2018.

6 goals

- (Croatia) Josip Barišić (Osijek 5, Cibalia 1)

5 goals

- (Croatia) Mladen Bartolović (Cibalia)

4 goals

- (Croatia) Nenad Bjelica (Osijek)
- (Croatia) Davor Čop (Cibalia)
- (Croatia) Zoran Zekić (Cibalia)

3 goals

- (Croatia) Josip Balatinac (Osijek)
- (Croatia) Danijel Bogdan (Cibalia)
- (Croatia) Ivan Bošnjak (Cibalia)
- (Croatia) Branko Karačić (Osijek)
- (Croatia) Goran Ljubojević (Osijek)
- (Croatia) Anton Maglica (Osijek)
- (Croatia) Vedran Nikšić (Osijek)
- (Croatia) Antonio Perošević (Osijek)
- (Croatia) Ivo Smoje (Osijek)
- (Croatia) Robert Špehar (Osijek)
- (Croatia) Dubravko Zdrilić (Osijek)

== Players who have scored for both clubs in the derby ==
- (Croatia) Josip Barišić (6 goals, 5 for Osijek and 1 for Cibalia)
- (Croatia) Hrvoje Plavšić (2 goals, 1 for Osijek and 1 for Cibalia)
- (Croatia) Ivica Šimunec (2 goals, 1 for Osijek and 1 for Cibalia)

== Players who have played for both clubs (senior career) ==
- Dušan Alempić
- Marijan Antolović
- Davor Bajsić
- Ivan Baraban
- Josip Barišić
- Mario Barišić
- Danijel Bogdan
- Krešimir Brkić
- Davor Burcsa
- Tomislav Čuljak
- Ivica Duspara
- Radoslav Gusić
- Sejad Halilović
- Igor Hodonj
- Kristijan Knežević
- Ivica Kulešević
- Josip Lukačević
- Andrej Lukić
- Marko Malenica
- Goran Meštrović
- Josip Milardović
- Ivan Miličević
- Matija Mišić
- Ilica Perić
- Marko Pervan
- Hrvoje Plavšić
- Dejan Prijić
- Igor Prijić
- Tomislav Radotić
- Darko Raić-Sudar
- Tihomir Rudež
- Tomislav Steinbrückner
- Ivica Šimunec
- Tomislav Štrkalj
- Mario Tadić
- Igor Tkalčević
- Josip Tomašević
- Tomislav Višević
- Frane Vitaić
- Marijan Vuka
- Željko Vuković
- Zoran Zekić
- Matias Zubak

== Managers who have worked at both clubs ==
- Branko Karačić
- Ivica Matković
- Stanko Mršić
- Ivo Šušak
- Tonko Vukušić

== Head-to-head league ranking ==
The following table shows the final position of the two clubs in Prva HNL, the Croatian top football league. Druga HNL is shown for the seasons in which one of the clubs competed in that league due to relegation. In summary, Osijek finished the league competition ahead of Cibalia a total of 16 times, while Cibalia finished ahead of Osijek on 6 occasions.

P.	92	93	94	95	96	97	98	99	00	01	02	03	04	05	06	07	08	09	10	11	12	13	14	15	16	17	18
1																											
2																											
3	3			3			3		3	3							3		3								
4					4			4					4		4					4						4	4
5		5										5							5		5						
6		6							6							6											
7			7															7				7					
8			8			8					8	8		8			8	8		8	8		8	8	8		
9	9							9		9					9											9	
10				10							10					10											10
11													11									11					
12					12																						
13						13																					
14																											
15																											
16																											
17																											
18																											
2. HNL
1							1							1											1		
2																							2				
3																											
4																											
5																											
6																								6			

Source: HRnogomet.com
