= 2013–14 NK Osijek season =

Osijek
2013–14 season
- Chairman: Zdravko Josić (until 26 February 2014); Slobodan Tolj
- Manager: Tomislav Steinbrückner (until 19 August 2013); Davor Rupnik (until 21 October 2013); Ivica Kulešević (until 26 February 2014); Tomislav Rukavina
- Prva HNL: 8th
- Croatian Cup: Quarter-final
Home colours	Away colours

The 2013–14 season was the 67th season in Osijek’s history and their twenty-third in the Prva HNL.

Osijek finished eighth in the final league standings.

== Competitions ==
=== Overall ===
Competition	Started round	Final result	First match	Last Match
2013–14 Prva HNL	–	TBD	12 July	17 May
2013–14 Croatian Cup	First round	Quarter-final	25 September	12 March

== Results and fixtures ==
=== Legend ===
Win Draw Loss Postponed

=== Prva HNL ===
12 July 2013 1	Dinamo Zagreb	3 – 1	Osijek	Zagreb
21:00 CET	Soudani 12'; Čop 19' (pen.) 68'	Report	(yellow card) 10' Mandić; 90' Barišić	Stadium: Stadion Maksimir; Attendance: 5,000; Referee: B. Križarić

22 July 2013 2	Osijek	1 – 2	Lokomotiva	Osijek
20:15 CET	Škorić (yellow card) 19'; Mišić (yellow card) 19'; Lulić 33'; Šorša (yellow card) 45+1'	Report	55' Musa; (yellow card) 65' Pjaca; (yellow card) 78' Martinac; (yellow card) 84' Miškić; 87' (pen.) Trebotić	Stadium: Stadion Gradski vrt Attendance: 2,000; Referee: M. Matoc

27 July 2013 3	Zadar	3 – 1	Osijek	Zadar
21:00 CET	Terkeš 14'; Begonja 20'; Ivančić 64' (yellow card) 90'; Con (yellow card) 75'	Report	7' Lulić; (yellow card) 90' Novaković	Stadium: Stadion Stanovi; Attendance: 1,500; Referee: B. Marić

2 August 2013 4	Osijek	2 – 1	Slaven Belupo	Osijek
20:15 CET	Vitaić 36' (pen.); Škorić (yellow card) 39'; Šorša 59'; Pavić (yellow card) 59'; Šimunec (yellow card) 83'	Report	(yellow card) 35' Rodić; 40' (pen.) (yellow card) 67' Gregurina; (yellow card) 73' Plazanić	Stadium: Stadion Gradski vrt Attendance: 1,500; Referee: I. Bebek

12 August 2013 5	Rijeka	5 – 1	Osijek	Rijeka
20:15 CET	Benko 10' 58'; Alispahić 20' 22'; Pokrivač 89'	Report	(yellow card) 52' Pušić; (yellow card) 80' Šimunec; 84' Lulić	Stadium: Stadion Kantrida; Attendance: 5,700; Referee: D. Strukan

18 August 2013 6	Osijek	1 – 3	Istra 1961	Osijek
21:00 CET	Lulić 10'; Pušić (yellow card) 67'	Report	16' Franjić; (yellow card) 24' Križman; 59' Graf; 87' Woon	Stadium: Stadion Gradski vrt Attendance: 2,000; Referee: D. Vučkov

25 August 2013 7	Split	4 – 0	Osijek	Split
21:00 CET	Bilić 12' (pen.); Rugašević (yellow card) 23'; Vojnović (yellow card) 62' (goal) 90+1'; Galović (yellow card) 69'; Belle 73'; Glavina 80'; Kvesić (yellow card) 89'	Report	(yellow card) 15' Lulić	Stadium: Stadion Park mladeži Attendance: 600; Referee: D. Mlakar

31 August 2013 8	Osijek	1 – 0	Hajduk Split	Osijek
19:00 CET	Lulić (yellow card) 24'; Mišić (yellow card) 27'; Pušić (yellow card) 48'; Novaković 90+1' (yellow card) 90+1'	Report	(yellow card) 45' Andrijašević; (yellow card) 69' Maloku; (yellow card) 87' Lučić	Stadium: Stadion Gradski vrt Attendance: 3,000; Referee: I. Pristovnik

13 September 2013 9	Hrvatski Dragovoljac	1 – 0	Osijek	Zagreb
18:00 CET	Tomić (yellow card) 26'; Jazvić 63'; Bačelić-Grgić (yellow card) 73'; Kluk (yellow card) 90+3'	Report	(yellow card) 16' M. Mišić; (yellow card) 45+1' Kurtović; (yellow card) 58' Babić; (yellow card) 72' Novaković	Stadium: Stadion NŠC Stjepan Spajić; Attendance: 800; Referee: D. Vučkov

22 September 2013 10	Osijek	0 – 1	Dinamo Zagreb	Osijek
15:00 CET	Lukić (yellow card) 12'; Kurtović (yellow card) 54' (yellow card) 86' (yellow-red card); M. Mišić (yellow card) 89'	Report	41' Soudani; (yellow card) 76' Šimunić	Stadium: Stadion Gradski vrt Attendance: 3,500; Referee: D. Strukan

28 September 2013 11	Lokomotiva	5 – 0	Osijek	Zagreb
15:00 CET	Lendrić 30'; Bručić 33'; P. Mišić (yellow card) 39' (goal) 64'; Chago (yellow card) 42'; Budimir 72'; Šovšić 83'	Report	(yellow card) 15' Babić	Stadium: Stadion Maksimir; Attendance: 400; Referee: Z. Šimčić

5 October 2013 12	Osijek	0 – 0	Zadar	Osijek
15:00 CET	Kurtović (yellow card) 8'; Šimunec (yellow card) 28' (yellow card) 50' (yellow-red card); Vitaić (yellow card) 74'; J. Mišić (yellow card) 77'	Report	(yellow card) 30' Hrgović; (yellow card) 47' Con; (yellow card) 85' Šimurina	Stadium: Stadion Gradski vrt Attendance: 1,000; Referee: D. Vučkov

=== Croatian Cup ===
25 September 2013 1	Torpedo Kuševac	0 – 3	Osijek	Kuševac
15:30 CET		Report	2' Dugandžić; 14' Jakovljević; 20' Ugarković	Attendance: 400

30 October 2013 2	Međimurje	0 – 2	Osijek	Čakovec
17:00 CET	Vuk (yellow card) 110'	Report	(yellow card) 16' Pavić; (yellow card) 42' Mišić; (yellow card) 88' Mandić; 97' Ugarković; 112' Grgić	Stadium: Stadion SRC Mladost; Attendance: 490; Referee: M. Matoc

19 February 2014 1/4 final	Rijeka	1 – 0	Osijek	Rijeka
17:00 CET	Maleš (yellow card) 30'; Bertoša (yellow card) 77'; Moises 82'	Report	(yellow card) 24' Mandić; (yellow card) 24' Mandić; (yellow card) 37' Jonjić; (yellow card) 86' Bralić	Stadium: Stadion Kantrida; Attendance: 3,000; Referee: I. Pristovnik

12 March 2014 1/4 final	Osijek	1 – 0 (2–4 p)	Rijeka	Osijek
17:00 CET	Pavić (yellow card) 54'; Dugandžić 55'; Mišić (yellow card) 90+2'	Report	(yellow card) 53' Jugović; (yellow card) 56' Sharbini; (yellow card) 89' Lešković	Stadium: Stadion Gradski vrt Attendance: 3,000; Referee: M. Strahonja
	Penalties
	Vitaić (penalty scored); Škorić (penalty missed); Perošević (penalty missed); Dugandžić (penalty scored)		Krstanović (penalty scored); Brezovec (penalty scored); Kramarić (penalty scored); Moises (penalty missed); Lešković (penalty scored)
