= 2016–17 Croatian First Football League =

26th season of the Croatian First Football League

MAXtv Prva liga
- Season: 2016–17
- Dates: 15 July 2016 – 27 May 2017
- Champions: Rijeka
- Relegated: RNK Split
- Champions League: Rijeka
- Europa League: Dinamo Zagreb; Hajduk Split; Osijek
- Matches: 180
- Goals: 435 (2.42 per match)
- Top goalscorer: Márkó Futács (18)
- Biggest home win: Dinamo Zagreb 6–0 Cibalia; Hajduk Split 6–0 Inter Zaprešić
- Biggest away win: Hajduk Split 0–4 Dinamo Zagreb
- Highest scoring: Rijeka 5–2 Dinamo Zagreb; Hajduk Split 6–1 Cibalia; Hajduk Split 5–2 RNK Split; Dinamo Zagreb 5–2 Rijeka
- Longest winning run: Dinamo Zagreb (8)
- Longest unbeaten run: Rijeka (31)
- Longest winless run: Inter Zaprešić (17)
- Longest losing run: Cibalia (7)
- Highest attendance: 29,109; Hajduk Split 0–4 Dinamo Zagreb
- Lowest attendance: 45; Hajduk Split 1–1 Slaven Belupo; Hajduk Split 3–0 Cibalia
- Total attendance: 494,941
- Average attendance: 2,750
- All statistics correct as of 27 May 2017.

The 2016–17 Croatian First Football League (also known as 1. HNL; officially styled MAXtv Prva liga for sponsorship reasons) was the 26th season of the Croatian First Football League, the national championship for men's association football teams in Croatia, since its establishment in 1992. The fixtures were announced on 15 June 2016. The season started on 15 July 2016 and finished on 27 May 2017. The league was contested by 10 teams. Rijeka won their first ever title, which broke Dinamo Zagreb's dominance of eleven consecutive titles.

== Teams ==
On 22 April 2016, Croatian Football Federation announced that the first stage of licensing procedure for 2016–17 season was complete. For the 2016–17 Prva HNL, only seven clubs were issued a top level license: Dinamo Zagreb, Hajduk Split, Istra 1961, Lokomotiva, Rijeka, Slaven Belupo and NK Zagreb. These clubs were also issued a license for participating in UEFA competitions. In the second stage of licensing, clubs that were not licensed in the first stage appealed the decision. On 23 May 2016, it was announced that all remaining Prva HNL clubs were granted top level license. Only two teams from Druga HNL acquired the top level license: Cibalia and Šibenik.

The following teams participated in the 2016–17 Prva HNL.

Locations of teams in 2016–17 Prva HNL

=== Stadia and locations ===
Stadium	City	Home club	Licensed club(s)	Capacity
Maksimir	Zagreb	Dinamo Zagreb		38,079
Poljud	Split	Hajduk Split		34,448
Gradski vrt	Osijek	Osijek		22,050
Stadion HNK Cibalia	Vinkovci	Cibalia		9,958
Aldo Drosina	Pula	Istra 1961		8,923
Kranjčevićeva	Zagreb	Zagreb	Lokomotiva	8,850
Rujevica	Rijeka	Rijeka		6,134
ŠRC Zaprešić	Zaprešić	Inter Zaprešić		5,228
Park Mladeži	Split	RNK Split		4,075
Gradski stadion	Koprivnica	Slaven Belupo		3,134

=== Personnel and kits ===
Club	Manager	Captain	Kit manufacturer	Sponsors
Cibalia	(Bosnia and Herzegovina) Mladen Bartolović	(Croatia) Frane Vitaić	Jako	
Dinamo Zagreb	(Bulgaria) Ivaylo Petev	(Croatia) Domagoj Antolić	Puma	
Hajduk Split	(Spain) Joan Carrillo	(Croatia) Zoran Nižić	Macron	Tommy
Inter Zaprešić	(Croatia) Samir Toplak	(Croatia) Ivan Čović	Joma	Veleučilište Baltazar Zaprešić
Istra 1961	(Croatia) Darko Raić-Sudar	(Croatia) Goran Roce	Nike	Croatia Osiguranje
Lokomotiva	(Croatia) Mario Tokić	(Croatia) Luka Capan	Nike	Crodux
Osijek	(Croatia) Zoran Zekić	(Croatia) Borna Barišić	Nike	Osječko
Rijeka	(Slovenia) Matjaž Kek	(Croatia) Mate Maleš	Jako	Sava Osiguranje
Slaven Belupo	(Croatia) Željko Kopić	(Croatia) Vedran Purić	adidas	Belupo
RNK Split	(Bosnia and Herzegovina) Bruno Akrapović	(Croatia) Tomislav Duka	Jako	Skladgradnja

=== Managerial changes ===
Team	Outgoing manager	Manner of departure	Date of vacancy	Replaced by	Date of appointment	Position in table
Lokomotiva	(Croatia) Sreten Ćuk	Signed by Persepolis	30 May 2016	(Croatia) Valentin Barišić	30 May 2016	Pre-season
Hajduk Split	(Croatia) Damir Burić	Removed from position	2 June 2016	(Slovenia) Marijan Pušnik	2 June 2016	Pre-season
Dinamo Zagreb	(Croatia) Zoran Mamić	Signed by Al-Nassr	20 June 2016	(Croatia) Zlatko Kranjčar	23 June 2016	Pre-season
Lokomotiva	(Croatia) Valentin Barišić	Removed from position	6 July 2016	(Croatia) Mario Tokić (caretaker)	–	Pre-season
Istra 1961	(Croatia) Andrej Panadić	Resigned	18 July 2016	(Croatia) Goran Tomić	26 July 2016	6th
RNK Split	(Croatia) Goran Sablić	Resigned	18 July 2016	(Croatia) Vjekoslav Lokica	20 July 2016	10th
Lokomotiva	(Croatia) Mario Tokić (caretaker)	Signing of Ivković	–	(Croatia) Tomislav Ivković	23 July 2016	7th
Dinamo Zagreb	(Croatia) Zlatko Kranjčar	Resigned	18 September 2016	(Croatia) Željko Sopić (caretaker)	–	3rd
Dinamo Zagreb	(Croatia) Željko Sopić (caretaker)	Signing of Petev	–	(Bulgaria) Ivaylo Petev	29 September 2016	3rd
Lokomotiva	(Croatia) Tomislav Ivković	Signed by Al-Faisaly	14 November 2016	(Croatia) Mario Tokić	14 November 2016	6th
Cibalia	(Croatia) Stanko Mršić	Removed from position	15 November 2016	(Croatia) Siniša Sesar (caretaker)	–	9th
Istra 1961	(Croatia) Goran Tomić	Signed by Shenzhen	29 November 2016	(Croatia) Darko Raić-Sudar (caretaker)	–	5th
Hajduk Split	(Slovenia) Marijan Pušnik	Removed from position	1 December 2016	(Spain) Joan Carrillo	5 December 2016	3rd
Istra 1961	(Croatia) Darko Raić-Sudar (caretaker)	Signing of Tot	–	(Croatia) Marijo Tot	30 December 2016	8th
Cibalia	(Croatia) Siniša Sesar (caretaker)	Signing of Pacult	–	(Austria) Peter Pacult	7 January 2017	10th
RNK Split	(Croatia) Vjekoslav Lokica	Resigned	9 February 2017	(Bosnia and Herzegovina) Bruno Akrapović	12 February 2017	9th
Cibalia	(Austria) Peter Pacult	Resigned	23 March 2017	(Bosnia and Herzegovina) Mladen Bartolović	27 March 2017	10th
Istra 1961	(Croatia) Marijo Tot	Removed from position	19 May 2017	(Croatia) Darko Raić-Sudar (caretaker)	–	7th

== League table ==
Pos	Team	Pld	W	D	L	GF	GA	GD	Pts	Qualification or relegation
1	Rijeka (C)	36	27	7	2	71	23	+48	88	Qualification to Champions League second qualifying round
2	Dinamo Zagreb	36	27	5	4	68	24	+44	86	Qualification to Europa League third qualifying round (Note: Since winners of 2016–17 Croatian Football Cup, Rijeka, qualified for Champions League, the spot awarded to the cup winner (Europa League third qualifying round) was passed to the runners-up and all other spots were adjusted accordingly.)
3	Hajduk Split	36	20	9	7	70	31	+39	69	Qualification to Europa League second qualifying round
4	Osijek	36	20	6	10	52	37	+15	66	Qualification to Europa League first qualifying round
5	Lokomotiva	36	12	8	16	41	38	+3	44	
6	Istra 1961	36	10	9	17	33	49	−16	39	
7	Slaven Belupo	36	9	11	16	36	45	−9	38	
8	Inter Zaprešić	36	5	13	18	26	57	−31	28	
9	Cibalia (O)	36	4	9	23	26	79	−53	21	Qualification to Relegation play-offs
10	RNK Split (R)	36	3	9	24	12	52	−40	18	Relegation to Croatian Third Football League

Source: Prva HNL (in Croatian), Soccerway
Rules for classification: 1) Points; 2) Head-to-head points; 3) Head-to-head goal difference; 4) Head-to-head goals scored (away goals if tied); 5) Goal difference; 6) Goals scored; 7) Play-off
(Note: Criteria 2-4 and 7 is only used if deciding Champion, teams to international competition or teams for relegation and in that case criteria 6 will not be used).
(C) Champions; (O) Play-off winners; (R) Relegated

== Results ==
Each team plays home-and-away against every other team in the league twice, for a total of 36 matches each played.

Home \ Away	CIB	DIN	HAJ	INT	IST	LOK	OSI	RIJ	SLA	SPL	CIB	DIN	HAJ	INT	IST	LOK	OSI	RIJ	SLA	SPL
Cibalia	—	0–2	0–2	3–3	1–1	1–4	0–2	0–0	0–0	1–0	—	1–2	1–2	1–1	0–2	1–1	1–1	0–3	3–1	1–0
Dinamo Zagreb	3–0	—	0–0	2–1	1–1	3–1	0–1	1–1	1–1	1–0	6–0	—	0–2	2–0	2–1	3–1	2–1	5–2	1–0	4–0
Hajduk Split	6–1	0–4	—	2–0	4–0	1–0	1–0	2–4	4–0	2–1	3–0	0–1	—	6–0	4–0	1–1	5–1	1–1	1–1	5–2
Inter Zaprešić	1–0	0–1	1–1	—	2–2	2–1	0–2	1–1	1–1	2–0	1–1	0–3	1–3	—	0–3	0–0	2–2	1–2	1–1	1–0
Istra 1961	3–2	1–2	0–0	4–1	—	1–1	0–1	0–2	0–0	1–0	1–2	0–3	0–2	1–0	—	1–0	1–3	1–1	0–0	1–0
Lokomotiva	4–0	0–1	0–2	0–1	2–1	—	2–3	0–2	0–2	0–0	4–1	1–2	0–0	2–0	1–0	—	2–0	1–0	2–1	3–0
Osijek	2–0	0–2	1–1	1–1	1–1	1–0	—	0–1	1–0	3–0	2–0	0–1	2–1	2–1	2–0	1–0	—	2–3	3–0	4–0
Rijeka	2–0	5–2	2–1	1–0	4–1	1–0	3–0	—	2–0	2–0	4–0	1–1	2–0	2–0	1–0	2–1	2–0	—	3–2	2–0
Slaven Belupo	3–2	0–1	2–1	2–0	2–0	2–3	2–3	0–0	—	0–0	4–0	2–1	1–2	2–0	2–0	1–1	1–2	0–2	—	0–1
RNK Split	2–2	0–1	0–1	0–0	0–3	0–2	1–1	0–3	3–0	—	1–0	0–1	1–1	0–0	0–1	0–0	0–1	0–2	0–0	—

Source: Prva HNL (in Croatian)
Legend: Blue = home team win; Yellow = draw; Red = away team win.
For upcoming matches, an "a" indicates there is an article about the rivalry between the two participants.

== Relegation play-offs ==
At the end of the season, ninth placed Cibalia qualified for a two-legged relegation play-off tie against Gorica, runners-up of the 2016–17 Croatian Second Football League.

=== First leg ===
4 June 2017
20:00 CEST

Gorica	0–2	Cibalia
	Report	P. Mišić 52'; Baša 89'

Stadion ŠRC Zaprešić, Zaprešić
Attendance: 1,820
Referee: Fran Jović (Zagreb)

=== Second leg ===
7 June 2017
20:00 CEST

Cibalia	3–1	Gorica
Baša 22'; Glavica 58'; Vitaić 89'	Report	Pejić 40'

Stadion HNK Cibalia, Vinkovci
Attendance: 1,536
Referee: Ivan Bebek (Rijeka)

Cibalia won 5–1 on aggregate.

== Statistics ==
=== Top scorers ===
As of 27 May 2017

Rank	Player	Club	Goals
1	(Hungary) Márkó Futács	Hajduk Split	18
2	(Algeria) El Arabi Hillel Soudani	Dinamo Zagreb	17
3	(Croatia) Franko Andrijašević	Rijeka	16
3	(Bosnia and Herzegovina) Armin Hodžić	Dinamo Zagreb	16
5	(North Macedonia) Muzafer Ejupi	Osijek	14
6	(Austria) Alexander Gorgon	Rijeka	12
7	(Slovenia) Roman Bezjak	Rijeka	11
7	(Croatia) Ante Erceg	Hajduk Split	11
7	(Switzerland) Mario Gavranović	Rijeka	11
7	(Croatia) Jakov Puljić	Inter Zaprešić	11

== Awards ==
=== Annual awards ===
Award	Winner	Club
Player of the Season	(Croatia) Franko Andrijašević	Rijeka
Manager of the Season	(Slovenia) Matjaž Kek	Rijeka
Young Player of the Season	(Croatia) Lovro Majer	Lokomotiva

Team of the Year
Goalkeeper	(Croatia) Dominik Livaković (Dinamo Zagreb)			
Defence	(North Macedonia) Stefan Ristovski (Rijeka)	(Croatia) Marko Lešković (Dinamo Zagreb)	(Croatia) Josip Elez (Rijeka)	(Croatia) Borna Barišić (Osijek)
Midfield	(Algeria) Hillal Soudani (Dinamo Zagreb)	(Croatia) Josip Mišić (Rijeka)	(Croatia) Franko Andrijašević (Rijeka)	(Croatia) Filip Bradarić (Rijeka)
Attack	(Switzerland) Mario Gavranović (Rijeka)		(Hungary) Márkó Futács (Hajduk Split)	

== Attendances ==
#	Club	Average
1	Hajduk	8,340
2	Rijeka	4,757
3	Dinamo Zagreb	4,482
4	Osijek	3,118
5	Cibalia	1,739
6	Istra	1,715
7	Slaven	1,096
8	Zaprešić	851
9	Radnički	755
10	Lokomotiva	644

== See also ==
- 2016–17 Croatian Second Football League
- 2016–17 Croatian Third Football League
- 2016–17 Croatian Football Cup
