= 2005–06 Croatian Second Football League =

Druga HNL
- Season: 2005–06
- Champions: Belišće (North Division); Šibenik (South Division)
- Promoted: Šibenik
- Relegated: Grafičar Vodovod; Metalac Osijek; Graničar Županja; Slavonija Požega; Dilj; Mladost Molve; Novalja; Segesta; Karlovac

The 2005–06 Druga HNL (also known as 2. HNL) season was the 15th season of Croatia's second level football since its establishment in 1992. The league was contested in two regional groups (North Division and South Division), with 12 clubs each. This was the last season under that format as the following season featured united Druga HNL with 16 teams. Mosor were originally relegated but were reprieved so that the following season has 16 clubs.

== North Division ==
=== Clubs ===
Club	City / Town	Stadium	Capacity
Belišće	Belišće	Gradski stadion Belišće	4,000
Bjelovar	Bjelovar	Gradski stadion Bjelovar	4,000
Čakovec	Čakovec	Stadion SRC Mladost	8,000
Dilj	Vinkovci	Stadion NK Dilj	3,000
Grafičar Vodovod	Osijek	Podgrađe	4,500
Graničar Županja	Županja	u Spomen "Prve Nogometne Lopte"	2,000
Koprivnica	Koprivnica	Gradski stadion Koprivnica	4,000
Marsonia	Slavonski Brod	Gradski Stadion uz Savu	10,000
Metalac Osijek	Osijek	SC Bikara	1,500
Mladost Molve	Molve	Petar Focić Stadium	1,000
Slavonija Požega	Požega	Gradski stadion Požega	4,000
Vukovar '91	Vukovar	Gradski stadion Borovo Naselje	6,000

=== First stage ===
Pos	Team	Pld	W	D	L	GF	GA	GD	Pts	Qualification
1	Belišće	22	14	6	2	41	14	+27	48	Qualification to play-off group
2	Grafičar Vodovod	22	11	6	5	38	21	+17	39	Qualification to play-off group
3	Bjelovar	22	11	4	7	25	26	−1	37	Qualification to play-off group
4	Vukovar '91	22	11	2	9	36	21	+15	35	Qualification to play-off group
5	Koprivnica	22	10	5	7	34	23	+11	35	Qualification to play-off group
6	Metalac Osijek	22	9	6	7	28	16	+12	33	Qualification to play-off group
7	Marsonia	22	9	4	9	25	30	−5	31	Qualification to play-out group
8	Čakovec	22	7	7	8	33	40	−7	28	Qualification to play-out group
9	Graničar Županja	22	7	4	11	28	28	0	25	Qualification to play-out group
10	Dilj	22	6	6	10	28	44	−16	24	Qualification to play-out group
11	Slavonija Požega	22	5	7	10	30	42	−12	22	Qualification to play-out group
12	Mladost Molve	22	2	3	17	23	64	−41	9	Qualification to play-out group

Source: RSSSF.org
Rules for classification: 1st points; 2nd head-to-head points; 3rd head-to-head goal difference; 4th head-to-head away goals scored

==== Rounds 1–22 results ====
Home \ Away	BEL	BJE	ČAK	DILJ	GRV	GRŽ	KOP	MAR	MET	MLA	SLA	VUK
Belišće		2–0	4–0	4–0	2–1	1–0	3–0	2–0	4–1	2–0	5–1	1–0
Bjelovar	0–0		1–2	1–0	1–0	1–0	2–3	2–3	1–1	2–1	3–2	1–0
Čakovec	1–5	1–1		3–1	1–1	2–1	1–1	2–0	0–0	2–2	3–1	3–0
Dilj	1–1	0–1	5–4		1–0	0–0	1–1	3–1	2–1	4–0	3–0	1–2
Grafičar Vodovod	0–0	3–1	2–1	5–0		2–0	2–1	1–2	1–0	5–0	2–2	2–1
Graničar Županja	0–0	3–0	3–0	2–0	1–3		1–0	3–1	2–1	7–0	1–1	1–2
Koprivnica	2–0	1–2	4–0	1–1	2–2	2–0		4–1	0–2	4–0	2–1	1–0
Marsonia	1–2	0–0	1–1	1–0	0–0	1–0	0–1		0–1	4–1	1–0	2–1
Metalac Osijek	1–1	0–1	1–0	9–1	0–0	1–0	1–0	0–1		2–0	3–1	0–1
Mladost Molve	0–1	2–3	2–4	1–1	0–2	3–2	2–4	3–3	0–3		2–3	2–1
Slavonija Požega	4–0	2–0	2–2	2–2	2–4	1–1	0–0	0–1	0–0	3–1		2–0
Vukovar '91	1–1	0–1	2–0	4–1	3–0	6–0	1–0	3–1	0–0	2–1	6–0	

Source: RSSSF.org
Legend: Blue = home team win; Yellow = draw; Red = away team win.

=== Play-off Group ===
Pos	Team	Pld	W	D	L	GF	GA	GD	Pts	Qualification
1	Belišće (C)	32	18	7	7	52	27	+25	61	Qualification to promotion play-off
2	Grafičar Vodovod (R)	32	15	9	8	57	39	+18	54	
3	Metalac Osijek (R)	32	14	10	8	46	26	+20	52	
4	Koprivnica	32	14	8	10	45	36	+9	50	
5	Bjelovar	32	14	6	12	39	39	0	48	
6	Vukovar '91	32	13	5	14	41	32	+9	44	

Source: RSSSF.org
Rules for classification: 1) points; 2) goal difference; 3) number of goals scored.
(C) Champions; (R) Relegated

==== Rounds 23–32 results ====
Home \ Away	BEL	BJE	GRV	KOP	MET	VUK
Belišće		1–0	1–1	0–2	1–2	2–0
Bjelovar	1–2		3–0	3–0	2–2	2–1
Grafičar Vodovod	3–1	4–2		5–1	3–3	1–1
Koprivnica	2–1	1–1	2–0		0–0	1–0
Metalac Osijek	1–2	1–0	4–1	2–1		3–0
Vukovar '91	1–0	1–0	0–1	1–1	0–0	

Source: RSSSF.org
Legend: Blue = home team win; Yellow = draw; Red = away team win.

=== Play-out Group ===
Pos	Team	Pld	W	D	L	GF	GA	GD	Pts	Relegation
7	Marsonia	32	16	6	10	51	41	+10	54	
8	Čakovec	32	13	10	9	59	47	+12	49	
9	Graničar Županja (R)	32	11	6	15	45	40	+5	39	
10	Slavonija Požega (R)	32	10	8	14	53	62	−9	38	
11	Dilj (R)	32	8	6	18	37	75	−38	30	
12	Mladost Molve (R)	32	3	5	24	32	93	−61	14	Relegation to Croatian Third Football League

Source: RSSSF.org
Rules for classification: 1) points; 2) goal difference; 3) number of goals scored.
(R) Relegated

==== Rounds 23–32 results ====
Home \ Away	ČAK	DILJ	GRŽ	MAR	MLA	SLA
Čakovec		4–1	1–3	2–1	7–1	4–1
Dilj	0–3		0–2	1–5	3–0	0–5
Graničar Županja	2–2	4–0		2–3	2–0	0–1
Marsonia	1–0	4–1	3–1		1–1	4–1
Mladost Molve	0–0	3–1	1–3	0–2		1–4
Slavonija Požega	0–4	1–2	2–1	2–2	6–2	

Source: RSSSF.org
Legend: Blue = home team win; Yellow = draw; Red = away team win.

== South Division ==
=== Clubs ===
Club	City / Town	Stadium	Capacity
Croatia Sesvete	Sesvete	Stadion ŠRC Sesvete	3,500
Hrvatski Dragovoljac	Zagreb	Stadion NŠC Stjepan Spajić	5,000
Imotski	Imotski	Stadion Gospin dolac	4,000
Karlovac	Karlovac	Stadion 13. srpanj	12,000
Mosor	Žrnovnica	Stadion Pricviće	3,000
Naftaš Ivanić Grad	Ivanić Grad	Sportski Park Zelenjak	2,000
Novalja	Novalja	Cissa Strasko	2,000
Pomorac	Kostrena	Stadion Žuknica	3,500
Segesta	Sisak	Gradski stadion Sisak	8,000
Solin Građa	Solin	Stadion pokraj Jadra	4,000
Šibenik	Šibenik	Stadion Šubićevac	8,000
Zadar	Zadar	Stadion Stanovi	5,860

=== First stage ===
Pos	Team	Pld	W	D	L	GF	GA	GD	Pts	Qualification
1	Šibenik	22	14	5	3	47	25	+22	47	Qualification to play-off group
2	Pomorac	22	10	10	2	45	22	+23	40	Qualification to play-off group
3	Croatia Sesvete	22	11	2	9	39	30	+9	35	Qualification to play-off group
4	Novalja	22	10	3	9	36	29	+7	33	Qualification to play-off group
5	Imotski	22	8	8	6	27	26	+1	32	Qualification to play-off group
6	Naftaš Ivanić Grad	22	8	8	6	31	33	−2	32	Qualification to play-off group
7	Hrvatski Dragovoljac	22	8	8	6	30	29	+1	32	Qualification to play-out group
8	Zadar	22	7	6	9	29	27	+2	27	Qualification to play-out group
9	Mosor	22	6	7	9	21	36	−15	25	Qualification to play-out group
10	Solin Građa	22	5	6	11	37	39	−2	21	Qualification to play-out group
11	Segesta	22	6	2	14	21	41	−20	20	Qualification to play-out group
12	Karlovac	22	4	5	13	18	44	−26	17	Qualification to play-out group

Source: RSSSF.org
Rules for classification: 1st points; 2nd head-to-head points; 3rd head-to-head goal difference; 4th head-to-head away goals scored

==== Rounds 1–22 results ====
Home \ Away	SES	HRD	IMO	KAR	MSR	NIG	NOV	POM	SEG	SOL	ŠIB	ZAD
Croatia Sesvete		0–0	2–1	10–0	1–1	3–0	1–3	2–5	2–0	5–2	3–1	1–0
Hrvatski Dragovoljac	1–0		1–2	3–1	3–1	1–0	4–2	1–1	3–0	1–0	2–2	2–1
Imotski	2–1	2–0		1–0	0–0	0–0	2–1	2–2	3–2	2–2	2–1	2–0
Karlovac	0–1	1–1	0–0		0–1	1–0	0–1	0–0	0–1	2–0	0–2	0–5
Mosor	0–2	1–1	1–1	1–1		0–0	2–1	0–5	1–0	3–2	3–1	3–1
Naftaš Ivanić	2–1	3–3	1–0	3–2	4–1		1–0	1–1	2–1	3–2	1–1	3–1
Novalja	0–1	4–0	2–0	4–2	2–1	1–1		2–1	1–0	4–1	2–3	0–0
Pomorac	4–0	2–0	1–1	2–0	0–0	2–2	2–1		4–0	2–1	1–1	2–1
Segesta	1–2	3–1	2–0	0–3	2–1	4–2	1–1	0–2		1–0	2–3	0–1
Solin Građa	2–0	1–1	2–2	2–4	3–0	3–0	1–2	3–3	6–0		1–1	1–1
Šibenik	3–1	0–0	2–1	5–0	4–0	5–2	2–0	2–1	2–0	2–1		2–1
Zadar	2–0	2–1	3–1	1–1	2–0	0–0	3–2	2–2	1–1	0–1	1–2	

Source: RSSSF.org
Legend: Blue = home team win; Yellow = draw; Red = away team win.

=== Play-off Group ===
Pos	Team	Pld	W	D	L	GF	GA	GD	Pts	Qualification
1	Šibenik (C, P)	32	21	6	5	71	38	+33	69	Qualification to promotion play-off
2	Croatia Sesvete	32	18	5	9	61	42	+19	59	
3	Pomorac	32	15	13	4	65	31	+34	58	
4	Novalja (R)	32	13	6	13	49	44	+5	45	
5	Imotski	32	10	10	12	36	43	−7	40	
6	Naftaš Ivanić Grad	32	8	8	16	38	62	−24	32	

Source: RSSSF.org
Rules for classification: 1) points; 2) goal difference; 3) number of goals scored.
(C) Champions; (P) Promoted; (R) Relegated

==== Rounds 23–32 results ====
Home \ Away	SES	IMO	NIG	NOV	POM	ŠIB
Croatia Sesvete		2–1	3–0	2–1	3–2	1–0
Imotski	2–3		2–1	0–0	0–0	1–2
Naftaš Ivanić	1–3	0–2		2–4	1–4	1–5
Novalja	2–2	3–0	3–0		0–0	0–1
Pomorac	1–1	1–0	1–0	5–0		6–3
Šibenik	2–2	5–1	2–1	3–0	1–0	

Source: RSSSF.org
Legend: Blue = home team win; Yellow = draw; Red = away team win.

=== Play-out Group ===
Pos	Team	Pld	W	D	L	GF	GA	GD	Pts	Relegation
7	Zadar	32	15	6	11	52	34	+18	51	
8	Hrvatski Dragovoljac	32	13	9	10	48	39	+9	48	
9	Solin Građa	32	13	6	13	60	50	+10	45	
10	Mosor	32	9	9	14	30	53	−23	36	
11	Segesta (R)	32	9	4	19	34	59	−25	31	
12	Karlovac (R)	32	4	6	22	21	70	−49	18	Relegation to Croatian Third Football League

Source: RSSSF.org
Rules for classification: 1) points; 2) goal difference; 3) number of goals scored.
(R) Relegated

==== Rounds 23–32 results ====
Home \ Away	HDR	KAR	MSR	SEG	SOL	ZAD
Hrvatski Dragovoljac		3–1	3–0	4–1	0–1	1–0
Karlovac	0–3		1–1	0–2	0–3	0–4
Mosor	1–0	3–1		1–2	2–0	0–3
Segesta	1–1	3–0	1–1		1–2	0–1
Solin Građa	3–2	2–0	1–0	6–2		3–1
Zadar	2–1	2–0	5–0	2–0	3–2	

Source: RSSSF.org
Legend: Blue = home team win; Yellow = draw; Red = away team win.

== Promotion play-off ==
Belišće did not get a first level license so the promotion playoff against Šibenik was cancelled and Šibenik was automatically promoted.

== See also ==
- 2005–06 Prva HNL
- 2005–06 Croatian Cup
