= Žitnjak =

Žitnjak may refer to:

- a neighborhood in Zagreb, Croatia, part of the Peščenica – Žitnjak district
- Miroslav Žitnjak, a Croatian footballer
