= Ivan Kelava =

Croatian footballer

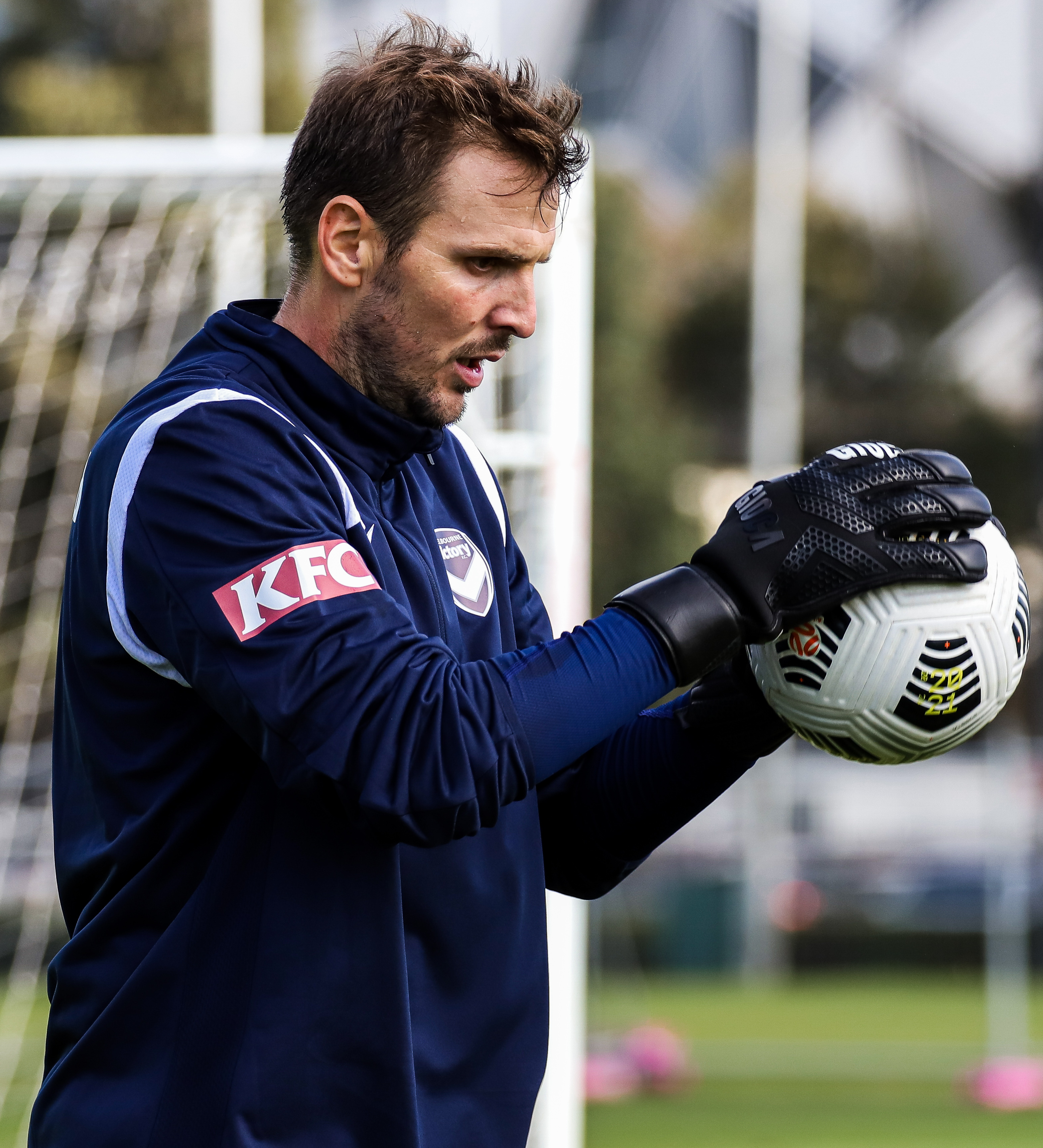
- Kelava with Melbourne Victory in 2021

Personal information
- Date of birth: 20 February 1988 (age 38)
- Place of birth: Zagreb, SR Croatia, Yugoslavia
- Height: 1.95 m (6 ft 5 in)
- Position: Goalkeeper

Team information
- Current team: Dinamo Zagreb (goalkeeping coach)

Youth career
- 1997–2006: Dinamo Zagreb

Senior career*
Years	Team	Apps	(Gls)
2007–2013	Dinamo Zagreb	101	(0)
2009–2010	→ Lokomotiva Zagreb (loan)	33	(0)
2013–2015	Udinese	10	(0)
2014	→ Carpi (loan)	1	(0)
2015	→ Spartak Trnava (loan)	14	(0)
2015–2016	Granada	0	(0)
2017	Debrecen	0	(0)
2017–2018	Politehnica Iași	14	(0)
2018–2019	Inter Zaprešić	14	(0)
2020	Alki Oroklini	11	(0)
2021	Xanthi	0	(0)
2021–2022	Melbourne Victory	27	(0)
Total		225	(0)

International career
2004	Croatia U16	1	(0)
2004–2005	Croatia U17	15	(0)
2006–2007	Croatia U19	12	(0)
2009	Croatia U20	4	(0)
2008–2010	Croatia U21	15	(0)

Managerial career
- 2025–: Dinamo Zagreb (goalkeeping coach)
- * Club domestic league appearances and goals

Ivan Kelava (born 20 February 1988) is a Croatian former professional footballer who played as a goalkeeper. He is currently goalkeeping coach of Croatian Football League club Dinamo Zagreb.

== Club career ==
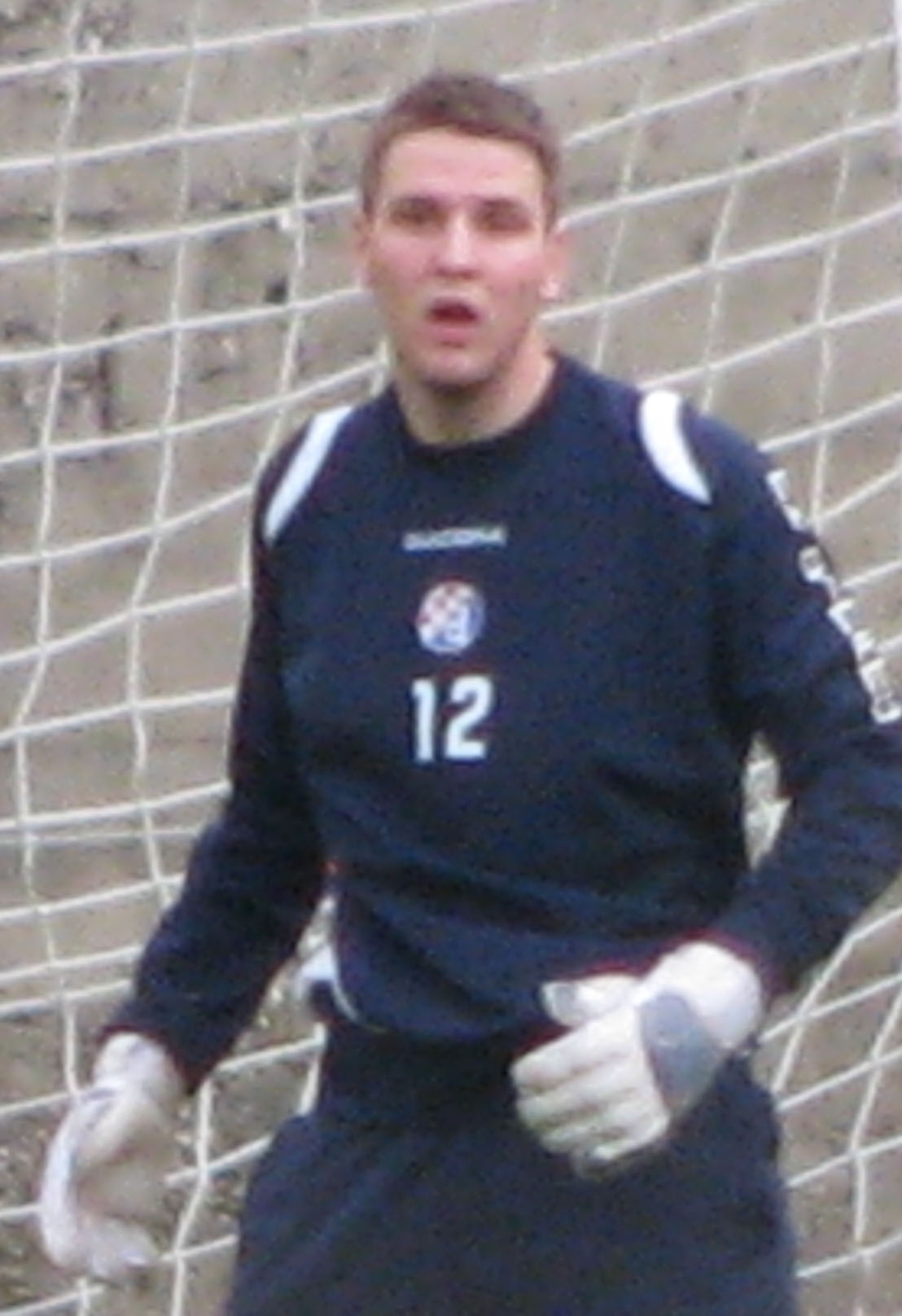
Kelava in 2008

Kelava played for Dinamo Zagreb's youth teams from 1997, being promoted to the club's senior squad in the summer of 2006.

=== Dinamo Zagreb ===
Kelava started his first–team career as the club's fourth–choice goalkeeper and did not appear in any competitive matches during the 2006–07 season. Kelava debuted for Dinamo Zagreb in the Croatian Cup in September 2007, before eventually making his Croatian First League debut in a 2–1 away victory against NK Zadar on 27 October 2007. By the end of the season he managed to establish himself as the club's second–choice goalkeeper, making a total of seven league appearances. On 2 October 2008, he made his European debut, replacing the injured Tomislav Butina in the opening minutes of the second leg of their UEFA Cup first round fixture against Sparta Prague.

In August 2009, Kelava was loaned to Lokomotiva Zagreb, where he established himself as their first–choice goalkeeper and made a total of 33 league appearances.

On 16 September 2010, Kelava kept a clean sheet in a 2–0 home win against Villarreal in the club's opening UEFA Europa League group match of the season. He was the first choice goalkeeper in the 2011–12 season as well, becoming a hero among Dinamo fans after making a number of crucial saves in the return leg of the Champions League play-off against Malmö FF which saw Dinamo through.

=== Udinese and Granada ===
On 4 July 2013, Kelava joined Udinese for €1 million. He made his Serie A debut on 25 August 2013, starting in a 2–1 away loss against Lazio. After being a backup to Željko Brkić, he subsequently had loan stints at Carpi and Spartak Trnava.

On 25 August 2015, Kelava moved to Udinese's feeder club Granada, mainly as a replacement to Real Sociedad-bound Oier Olazábal. On 29 December 2016, he terminated his contract, after being rarely used.

=== Later years ===
On 1 February 2017, Kelava signed for Hungarian club Debrecen on a two-and-a-half-year contract. On 15 June of the same year, he joined Romanian club Politehnica Iași. After having spent five years abroad, Kelava returned to his native country on 19 June 2018, and signed for Inter Zaprešić.

== International career ==
Between 2004 and 2010, Kelava was capped over 50 times for Croatia at various youth levels. He won a total of 15 international caps for the Croatian national under-21 football team since making his debut against Chile U20 in a friendly played in Kuala Lumpur on 20 May 2008.

Kelava was called up by Slaven Bilić in the Croatia squad for Euro 2012, but failed to make an appearance in the tournament. Bilić was succeeded by Igor Štimac, who also called up Kelava as an unused third choice goalkeeper behind Stipe Pletikosa and Danijel Subašić for the 2014 FIFA World Cup qualification.

== Career statistics ==
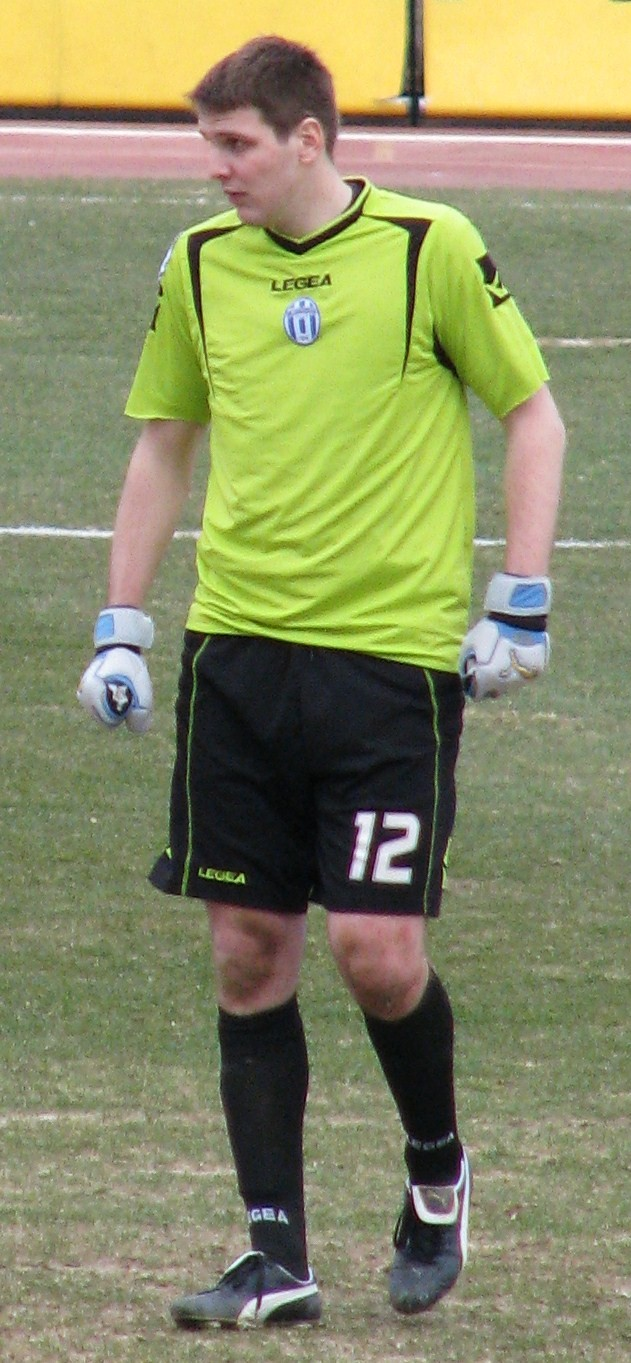
Kelava with Lokomotiva Zagreb in 2010

=== Club ===
As of match played on 30 April 2018

Appearances and goals by club, season and competition
Club	Season	League			Cup		Continental		Total	
Club	Season	Division	Apps	Goals	Apps	Goals	Apps	Goals	Apps	Goals
Dinamo Zagreb	2007–08	Prva HNL	7	0	2	0	—		9	0
Dinamo Zagreb	2008–09	Prva HNL	10	0	2	0	6 (Note: Appearances in UEFA Champions League and UEFA Europa League)	0	18	0
Dinamo Zagreb	2010–11	Prva HNL	24	0	7	0	6 (Note: Appearances in UEFA Europa League)	0	37	0
Dinamo Zagreb	2011–12	Prva HNL	27	0	7	0	12 (Note: Appearances in UEFA Champions League)	0	46	0
Dinamo Zagreb	2012–13	Prva HNL	33	0	1	0	12	0	46	0
Dinamo Zagreb	Total		101	0	19	0	36	0	156	0
Lokomotiva Zagreb (loan)	2009–10	Prva HNL	27	0	0	0	—		27	0
Lokomotiva Zagreb (loan)	2010–11	Prva HNL	6	0	1	0	—		7	0
Lokomotiva Zagreb (loan)	Total		33	0	1	0	—		34	0
Udinese	2013–14	Serie A	10	0	1	0	4	0	15	0
Carpi (loan)	2014–15	Serie B	1	0	0	0	—		1	0
Spartak Trnava (loan)	2014–15	Slovak First League	14	0	1	0	—		15	0
Granada	2015–16	La Liga	0	0	4	0	—		4	0
Debreceni	2016–17	Nemzeti Bajnokság I	0	0	0	0	—		0	0
Politehnica Iași	2017–18	Liga I	14	0	1	0	—		15	0
Inter Zaprešić	2018–19	Prva HNL	0	0	0	0	—		0	0
Career total			173	0	27	0	40	0	240	0

== Honours ==
Dinamo Zagreb

- Croatian First League: 2007–08, 2008–09, 2010–11, 2011–12, 2012–13
- Croatian Cup: 2007–08, 2008–09, 2010–11, 2011–12

Melbourne Victory

- FFA Cup: 2021

Individual

- Football Oscar Best Prva HNL goalkeeper: 2013
- Football Oscar Prva HNL Team of the Year: 2013
