= Tomislav Pavličić =

Croatian footballer

Personal information
- Full name: Tomislav Pavličić
- Date of birth: 6 December 1983 (age 42)
- Place of birth: Vinkovci, SR Croatia, SFR Yugoslavia
- Height: 1.73 m (5 ft 8 in)
- Position: Midfielder

Team information
- Current team: Dilj

Senior career*
Years	Team	Apps	(Gls)
2003–2004	Virovitica		
2004–2010	Cibalia	53	(11)
2006–2007	→ Graničar Županja (loan)	25	(22)
2007–2008	→ Suhopolje (loan)	29	(30)
2010–2011	Maribor	15	(2)
2011–2014	Cibalia	67	(4)
2014	Tomislav Cerna	12	(20)
2015	Balmazújváros	6	(0)
2015-2019	Dilj		
- * Club domestic league appearances and goals as of 12 November 2022 ‡ National team caps and goals as of 23:40, 1 June 2011 (UTC)

Tomislav Pavličić (born 6 December 1983) is a Croatian football midfielder, currently plays for Dilj Vinkovci.

== Club career ==
Known for his free kick skills, Pavličić had a difficult start of his professional career. After the end of his first season at Croatian football club Cibalia he was involved in a car accident, caused by an intoxicated driver who ran his car into Pavličić's. Pavličić sustained heavy injuries of his leg and subsequently had to endure a knee operation that sidelined him for over six months. The recovery was hard and after his return to football he first had to prove himself at Graničar Županja and a season later at Suhopolje, both members of the Croatian third division, 3.HNL. He had done that in big fashion as he scored a total of 52 goals in two season for both clubs. After a season at Suhopolje, where he scored an impressive 30 goals in 29 matches, he returned to Cibalia and was given a chance in Croatian top division, which he never let go. In his first Prva HNL season after the injury he made 29 appearances for the club, scoring five goals and earning seven assists (the highest in the league during that season). The very next season he, already a team captain, was voted in the first squad of the 2009–10 Prva HNL season. After that season his contract with Cibalia expired and he had plenty of new offers from clubs at home and abroad. He eventually decided in favour of the Slovenian side, Maribor, signing a contract until June 2013. However, his stay in Maribor was brief as he failed to fulfill the expectations of his new club and their fans and he returned to Cibalia after only one season.

== Personal life ==
After his departure from Prva HNL he promised to the fans of Cibalia that he will eventually return to the club, where he plans to finish his professional career. Although he is left footed, he uses his right hand for writing.
