= Tomislav Mazalović =

Croatian footballer

Personal information
- Full name: Tomislav Mazalović
- Date of birth: 10 June 1990 (age 36)
- Place of birth: Vinkovci, Croatia
- Height: 1.85 m (6 ft 1 in)
- Position: Midfielder

Team information
- Current team: Gaj Mače
- Number: 16

Youth career
- 1996–2008: Cibalia

Senior career*
Years	Team	Apps	(Gls)
2008–2014	Cibalia	143	(12)
2014–2018	Inter Zaprešić	110	(8)
2018–2019	Diósgyőr	14	(0)
2019–2022	Inter Zaprešić	75	(3)
2022–	Gaj Mače		

International career
2008	Croatia U19	6	(0)
2010	Croatia U20	1	(0)
- * Club domestic league appearances and goals as of 21:09, 13 November 2019 (UTC)

Tomislav Mazalović (born 10 June 1990) is a Croatian footballer who plays for Croatian club Gaj Mače as a midfielder.

== Career ==
=== Cibalia/Inter Zaprešić ===
Born in Vinkovci, Mazalović made his professional debut with Cibalia in 2008 and in the course of six years which he spent in the club, he made 143 league appearances. He scored his first goal for the club in November 2008, in a 3–1 victory over Sesvete. In 2010, he featured in an UEFA Europa League match against Cliftonville where he unsuccessfully shot at the goal a number of times. In July 2013, it was announced that his contract would not be renewed and would be released at the end of the season.

Mazalović moved to Inter Zaprešić in 2014. In October 2015, he scored his first goal in the Croatian First Football League in a 3–0 victory against Istra 1961. He received a red card in the 67th minute of a match against Hajduk Split in March 2017. In July 2016, he wore the captain's armband for the first time in a match due to the absence of Ivan Čović and Ivan Čeliković. He was injured in the month of May during a match against Cibalia.

=== Diósgyőri VTK ===
After having amassed 201 caps in the Croatian first tier, Mazalovic moved abroad and joined Hungarian club Diósgyőri VTK on 18 June 2018.

== Career statistics ==
=== Club ===
As of match played on 11 May 2019

Club	Season	League			Cup		Other		Total	
Club	Season	Division	Apps	Goals	Apps	Goals	Apps	Goals	Apps	Goals
Cibalia	2008–09	Prva HNL	26	1	0	0	—		26	1
Cibalia	2009–10	Prva HNL	21	1	0	0	—		21	1
Cibalia	2010–11	Prva HNL	19	0	2	0	2 (Note: Appearances in UEFA Europa League)	0	23	0
Cibalia	2011–12	Prva HNL	20	1	3	0	—		23	1
Cibalia	2012–13	Prva HNL	28	7	6	1	—		34	8
Cibalia	2013–14	Druga HNL	29	2	0	0	2 (Note: Appearances in Play-offs)	0	31	2
Cibalia	Total		143	12	11	1	4	0	158	13
Inter Zaprešić	2014–15	Druga HNL	23	3	1	0	—		24	3
Inter Zaprešić	2015–16	Prva HNL	29	1	1	0	—		30	1
Inter Zaprešić	2016–17	Prva HNL	28	0	1	0	—		29	0
Inter Zaprešić	2017–18	Prva HNL	30	4	2	1	—		32	5
Inter Zaprešić	Total		110	8	5	1	—		115	9
Diósgyőri	2018–19	Nemzeti Bajnokság I	14	0	1	0	—		15	0
Career total			267	20	17	2	4	0	288	22
