= Ninoslav Parmaković =

Croatian footballer

Personal information
- Date of birth: 24 November 1982 (age 43)
- Place of birth: Vinkovci, SR Croatia, SFR Yugoslavia
- Height: 1.82 m (5 ft 11 1/2 in)
- Position: Defender

Senior career*
| Years | Team | Apps | (Gls) |
| 2001–2004 | Cibalia | 15 | (0) |
| 2004–2005 | Dilj | 24 | (2) |
| 2005–2007 | Kamen Ingrad | 53 | (3) |
| 2007–2009 | Zadar | 48 | (3) |
| 2009–2012 | Cibalia | 58 | (2) |
| 2012–2015 | Slavonija Požega | | |
| 2012–2016 | NK Požega | | |
| 2016-2019 | Kaptol | | |

International career^{‡}
| 1998 | Croatia U15 | 2 | (0) |
| 1998–2000 | Croatia U17 | 4 | (0) |
| 2000 | Croatia U19 | 2 | (0) |
| 2002–2003 | Croatia U20 | 6 | (0) |
- * Club domestic league appearances and goals as of 18 November 2011 ‡ National team caps and goals as of 27 May 2003

Ninoslav Parmaković (born 24 November 1982) is a Croatian football player who played as defender.

== Club career ==
During his career he also had spells at Kamen Ingrad, Zadar, Slavonija Požega and Cibalia, as well as the second-level side Dilj.

== International career ==
Parmaković was also capped for the Croatia national team at several youth levels between 1998 and 2003.
