= Michael Paradžiković =

Croatian footballer

Personal information
- Date of birth: 9 January 1992 (age 34)
- Place of birth: Reutlingen, Germany
- Height: 1.88 m (6 ft 2 in)
- Position: Goalkeeper

Youth career
- –2006: Cibalia
- 2006–2007: Istra 1961
- 2007: Cibalia
- 2007–2008: Dilj
- 2008–2010: Cibalia

Senior career*
Years	Team	Apps	(Gls)
2010–2012	Cibalia	9	(0)
2011–2012	→ Marsonia 1909 (loan)	2	(0)

International career
2009	Croatia U17	1	(0)
2009–2010	Croatia U18	6	(0)
2009–2011	Croatia U19	9	(0)
2011	Croatia U20	2	(0)
- * Club domestic league appearances and goals

Michael Paradžiković (born 9 January 1992) is a Croatian former professional footballer who played as a goalkeeper.

== Club career ==
Paradžiković started his career playing at youth level for Cibalia, where he signed a professional three-year contract in November 2010. He made his debut for the first team on 13 August 2011 in a 4–1 defeat to Slaven Belupo. At the end of August, he was loaned to Druga HNL side Marsonia 1909 where he was featured in only two games before returning to Cibalia in January 2012.
