= Tomo Gluić =

Croatian footballer (born 1983)

Personal information
- Date of birth: 26 July 1983 (age 43)
- Place of birth: Zadar, Croatia
- Height: 1.87 m (6 ft 1 1/2 in)
- Position: Goalkeeper

Youth career
- 1993–1999: Zadar
- 1999–2002: Dinamo Zagreb
- 2000: loan to Lokomotiva Zagreb
- 2001: loan to HAŠK

Senior career*
Years	Team	Apps	(Gls)
2002–2003	ZET	17	
2003–2005	GOŠK Dubrovnik	15	
2005–2006	Bjelovar	1	
2005–2006	GOŠK Dubrovnik	12	
2007–2009	Velebit Benkovac	82	
2009–2017	Zadar	104	(0)
- * Club domestic league appearances and goals as of 26 July 2022 ‡ National team caps and goals as of 18 August 2012

Tomo Gluić (born 26 July 1983) is a Croatian retired football player, who last played for hometown club NK Zadar.

After retiring as a player, he was hired by the Chinese FA as a goalkeeper coach for their U-13 team.
