= Ivan Koledić =

Croatian footballer

Personal information
- Date of birth: 27 September 1989 (age 37)
- Place of birth: Vinkovci, SR Croatia, SFR Yugoslavia
- Height: 1.88 m (6 ft 2 in)
- Position: Forward

Team information
- Current team: Bedem Ivankovo
- Number: 10

Youth career
- –2005: Borinci Jarmina
- 2005–2007: Dilj
- 2008: Cibalia

Senior career*
Years	Team	Apps	(Gls)
2008–2013	Cibalia	47	(6)
2008–2009	→ Dilj (loan)	23	(19)
2009–2010	→ Vukovar '91 (loan)	9	(1)
2013–2014	Gorica	10	(0)
2014–2015	Vukovar '91		
2015–2022	Bedem Ivankovo		
2022-	NK Borinci Jarmina		
- * Club domestic league appearances and goals as of 4 December 2011

Ivan Koledić (born 27 September 1989) is a Croatian football forward, currently playing for NK Borinci Jarmina.

== Club career ==
He joined second tier-outfit Gorica from Cibalia in September 2013.
