= 2012–13 Croatian First Football League =

MAXtv Prva Liga
- Season: 2012–13
- Champions: Dinamo Zagreb
- Relegated: NK Zagreb; Cibalia; Inter Zaprešić
- Champions League: Dinamo Zagreb
- Europa League: Lokomotiva; Rijeka; Hajduk Split
- Matches: 198
- Goals: 489 (2.47 per match)
- Top goalscorer: Leon Benko (18 goals)
- Biggest home win: Dinamo Zagreb 6–0 NK Zagreb
- Biggest away win: Zadar 1–5 Inter Zaprešić
- Highest scoring: Zadar 2–4 Hajduk Split; Hajduk Split 5–1 NK Zagreb; Dinamo Zagreb 4–2 RNK Split; Dinamo Zagreb 6–0 NK Zagreb; Zadar 1–5 Inter Zaprešić; Zadar 2–4 Rijeka; Lokomotiva 5–1 Slaven Belupo
- Average attendance: 2,511

The 2012–13 Croatian First Football League (also known as 1. HNL; officially styled as MAXtv Prva Liga for sponsorship reasons) was the 22nd season of the Croatian First Football League, the national championship for men's association football teams in Croatia, since its establishment in 1992. The season started on 21 July 2012 and ended on 26 May 2013.

The league was contested by 12 teams, down from 16 in the previous season. Dinamo Zagreb were the defending champions, having won their seventh consecutive title in 2011–12.

== Format changes ==
The league was contested by twelve teams, four fewer than in the previous season, with each club playing every other club three times for a total of 33 rounds (last time the system was used in the 2008–09 season). On 13 April 2012, Croatian Football Federation announced that the first stage of licensing procedure for 2012–13 season was completed. For the 2012–13 Prva HNL, only three out of twenty applied clubs were issued a top level license: Dinamo Zagreb, Lokomotiva and NK Zagreb. In the second stage of licensing procedure clubs that didn't get a license appealed on the decision and provided new facts and arguments. On 15 May 2012, it was announced that all remaining Prva HNL clubs from the previous season were granted top level license, except for Šibenik, Karlovac and Varaždin. Only one team from Druga HNL acquired the top level license: Hrvatski Dragovoljac, however, they didn't manage to finish the season within top two places which would secure them promotion. Since none of the top two teams from Druga HNL acquired top level license, the 12th placed team from the 2011–12 Prva HNL were allowed to stay. If that wasn't the case, Inter Zaprešić and Rijeka would have needed to play a two-legged play-off match to decide who gets relegated since they were equal on all of the tiebreakers.

== Teams ==
The following is a complete list of teams which contested the 2012–13 Prva HNL.

Locations of teams in 2012–13 Prva HNL

=== Stadia and locations ===
| Stadium | City | Home club | Licensed club(s) | Capacity |
|---|---|---|---|---|
| Maksimir | Zagreb | Dinamo Zagreb | Lokomotiva | 37,168 |
| Poljud | Split | Hajduk Split | | 34,448 |
| Gradski vrt | Osijek | Osijek | | 22,050 |
| Kantrida | Rijeka | Rijeka | | 12,600 |
| Stadion HNK Cibalia | Vinkovci | Cibalia | | 9,958 |
| Aldo Drosina | Pula | Istra 1961 | | 8,923 |
| Kranjčevićeva | Zagreb | NK Zagreb | | 8,850 |
| Stanovi | Zadar | Zadar | | 5,860 |
| ŠRC Zaprešić | Zaprešić | Inter Zaprešić | | 5,228 |
| Park mladeži | Split | RNK Split | | 4,075 |
| Gradski stadion | Koprivnica | Slaven Belupo | | 3,059 |

=== Personnel and kits ===
| Team | Manager | Captain | Kit manufacturer | Shirt sponsor |
|---|---|---|---|---|
| Cibalia | (Croatia) Miroslav Bojko | (Croatia) Mario Lučić | Jako | Croatia Osiguranje |
| Dinamo Zagreb | (Croatia) Krunoslav Jurčić | (Croatia) Ivan Kelava | Puma | — |
| Hajduk Split | (Croatia) Igor Tudor | (Croatia) Mario Maloča | Umbro | — |
| Inter Zaprešić | (Croatia) Rajko Magić | (Croatia) Tomislav Šarić | Joma | VŠPU "B.A.Krčelić" |
| Istra 1961 | (Croatia) Igor Pamić | (Croatia) Fausto Budicin | errea | — |
| Lokomotiva | (Croatia) Tomislav Ivković | (Croatia) Leonard Mesarić | Puma | — |
| Osijek | (Croatia) Miroslav Žitnjak (caretaker) | (Croatia) Ivo Smoje | Jako | Croatia Osiguranje |
| Rijeka | (Slovenia) Matjaž Kek | (Croatia) Dario Knežević | Lotto | — |
| Slaven Belupo | (Croatia) Roman Sović | (Croatia) Alen Maras | adidas | Belupo |
| RNK Split | (Croatia) Goran Sablić | (Croatia) Andrija Vuković | Jako | Skladgradnja |
| Zadar | (Croatia) Ferdo Milin | (Croatia) Jakov Surać | Lotto | Hotel Kolovare |
| NK Zagreb | (Croatia) Miroslav Blažević | (Croatia) Hrvoje Štrok | Kappa | — |

=== Managerial changes ===
| Team | Outgoing manager | Manner of departure | Date of vacancy | Replaced by | Date of appointment | Position in table |
|---|---|---|---|---|---|---|
| Cibalia | (Croatia) Samir Toplak | Resigned | 27 July 2012 | (Croatia) Željko Kopić | 28 July 2012 | 12th |
| NK Zagreb | (Croatia) Dražen Besek | Resigned | 3 September 2012 | (Croatia) Luka Bonačić | 3 September 2012 | 12th |
| Zadar | (Croatia) Dalibor Zebić | Resigned | 22 September 2012 | (Croatia) Ferdo Milin | 24 September 2012 | 11th |
| RNK Split | (Croatia) Tonći Bašić | Removed from position | 13 October 2012 | (Croatia) Zoran Vulić | 13 October 2012 | 7th |
| NK Zagreb | (Croatia) Luka Bonačić | Sacked | 27 October 2012 | (Croatia) Dražen Madunović | 30 October 2012 | 11th |
| NK Zagreb | (Croatia) Dražen Madunović | Removed from position | 5 November 2012 | (Croatia) Miroslav Blažević | 5 November 2012 | 11th |
| Cibalia | (Croatia) Željko Kopić | Resigned | 25 November 2012 | (Croatia) Miroslav Bojko | 25 November 2012 | 10th |
| Dinamo Zagreb | (Croatia) Ante Čačić | Sacked | 26 November 2012 | (Croatia) Krunoslav Jurčić | 26 November 2012 | 1st |
| Rijeka | (Croatia) Elvis Scoria | Resigned | 24 February 2013 | (Slovenia) Matjaž Kek | 27 February 2013 | 5th |
| Slaven Belupo | (Croatia) Roy Ferenčina | Sacked | 10 March 2013 | (Croatia) Roman Sović | 14 March 2013 | 6th |
| Inter Zaprešić | (Croatia) Borimir Perković | Sacked | 14 March 2013 | (Croatia) Rajko Magić | 14 March 2013 | 12th |
| Hajduk Split | (Croatia) Mišo Krstičević | Sacked | 29 April 2013 | (Croatia) Igor Tudor | 29 April 2013 | 4th |
| RNK Split | (Croatia) Zoran Vulić | Mutual consent | 12 May 2013 | (Croatia) Goran Sablić | 13 May 2013 | 4th |
| Osijek | (Croatia) Stanko Mršić | Sacked | 13 May 2013 | (Croatia) Miroslav Žitnjak (caretaker) | 13 May 2013 | 4th |

== League table ==
| Pos | Team | Pld | W | D | L | GF | GA | GD | Pts | Qualification or relegation |
|---|---|---|---|---|---|---|---|---|---|---|
| 1 | Dinamo Zagreb (C) | 33 | 24 | 5 | 4 | 68 | 20 | +48 | 77 | Qualification to Champions League second qualifying round |
| 2 | Lokomotiva | 33 | 16 | 9 | 8 | 54 | 38 | +16 | 57 | Qualification to Europa League second qualifying round (Note: Hajduk Split qualify for 2013–14 Europa League Second qualifying round as winners of 2012–13 Croatian Cup.) |
| 3 | Rijeka | 33 | 15 | 8 | 10 | 46 | 42 | +4 | 53 | Qualification to Europa League second qualifying round |
| 4 | Hajduk Split | 33 | 14 | 10 | 9 | 45 | 31 | +14 | 52 | Qualification to Europa League second qualifying round |
| 5 | RNK Split | 33 | 15 | 7 | 11 | 49 | 37 | +12 | 52 | |
| 6 | Istra 1961 | 33 | 11 | 11 | 11 | 35 | 32 | +3 | 44 | |
| 7 | Osijek | 33 | 9 | 12 | 12 | 25 | 33 | −8 | 39 | |
| 8 | Slaven Belupo | 33 | 10 | 9 | 14 | 35 | 50 | −15 | 39 | |
| 9 | Zadar | 33 | 9 | 9 | 15 | 39 | 61 | −22 | 36 | |
| 10 | Inter Zaprešić (R) | 33 | 8 | 11 | 14 | 36 | 41 | −5 | 35 | Relegation to Croatian Second Football League |
| 11 | Cibalia (R) | 33 | 9 | 5 | 19 | 29 | 44 | −15 | 32 | Relegation to Croatian Second Football League |
| 12 | NK Zagreb (R) | 33 | 7 | 6 | 20 | 28 | 60 | −32 | 27 | Relegation to Croatian Second Football League |

Source: Sportnet.hr
Rules for classification: 1) points; 2) goal difference; 3) number of goals scored.
For deciding champions, qualification to UEFA Europa League and relegation: 1st points; 2nd head-to-head points; 3rd head-to-head goal difference; 4th head-to-head away goals scored
(C) Champions; (R) Relegated

== Results ==
Every team will play three times against each other team for a total of 33 matches. The first 22 matchdays will consist of a regular double round-robin schedule. The league standings at this point will then be used to determine the games for the last 11 matchdays.

| Home \ Away | CIB | DIN | HAJ | INT | IST | LOK | OSI | RIJ | SLA | SPL | ZAD | ZAG | CIB | DIN | HAJ | INT | IST | LOK | OSI | RIJ | SLA | SPL | ZAD | ZAG |
|---|---|---|---|---|---|---|---|---|---|---|---|---|---|---|---|---|---|---|---|---|---|---|---|---|
| Cibalia | | 0–1 | 0–2 | 1–1 | 0–1 | 3–2 | 2–0 | 4–1 | 0–3 | 2–1 | 0–0 | 1–1 | | 0–1 | | 1–0 | | 2–0 | | 0–1 | | | 2–3 | |
| Dinamo Zagreb | 2–1 | | 3–1 | 1–1 | 3–1 | 1–0 | 0–0 | 4–1 | 3–0 | 4–2 | 5–0 | 6–0 | | | 3–1 | 2–0 | | | 0–0 | | 1–0 | 2–0 | 5–0 | |
| Hajduk Split | 4–0 | 1–2 | | 1–0 | 0–1 | 0–0 | 1–1 | 1–1 | 3–1 | 1–0 | 3–0 | 5–1 | 2–1 | | | | 1–2 | 0–0 | 1–0 | 1–2 | | | | 3–2 |
| Inter Zaprešić | 0–0 | 0–2 | 1–1 | | 2–0 | 0–1 | 0–3 | 2–0 | 2–2 | 0–2 | 0–1 | 1–2 | | | 1–1 | | 0–2 | | | | 2–0 | 0–0 | | 2–0 |
| Istra 1961 | 3–0 | 0–1 | 0–0 | 3–1 | | 2–2 | 1–3 | 1–1 | 0–0 | 1–0 | 1–1 | 0–0 | 2–1 | 0–0 | | | | 1–1 | | 1–0 | | | | 0–0 |
| Lokomotiva | 1–0 | 1–3 | 2–0 | 2–3 | 1–0 | | 0–0 | 2–1 | 3–1 | 3–2 | 2–1 | 1–1 | | 1–2 | | 2–2 | | | 1–0 | | 5–1 | 1–0 | 4–1 | |
| Osijek | 1–0 | 2–1 | 0–0 | 1–1 | 0–0 | 1–2 | | 1–1 | 1–2 | 2–2 | 2–0 | 1–0 | 1–0 | | | 0–2 | 0–4 | | | | | | 1–0 | 1–0 |
| Rijeka | 0–0 | 3–0 | 1–0 | 2–1 | 2–1 | 2–2 | 3–1 | | 0–0 | 2–3 | 0–0 | 1–0 | | 0–0 | | 2–1 | | 1–3 | 1–0 | | 2–1 | | 2–3 | |
| Slaven Belupo | 2–1 | 1–4 | 0–2 | 2–2 | 3–1 | 3–2 | 2–0 | 1–3 | | 2–2 | 2–0 | 1–0 | 0–2 | | 1–1 | | 1–0 | | 0–0 | | | 0–0 | | 0–3 |
| RNK Split | 3–1 | 1–0 | 0–1 | 1–0 | 2–1 | 1–1 | 0–0 | 2–0 | 2–0 | | 3–1 | 3–2 | 1–0 | | 2–1 | | 0–1 | | 4–1 | 3–1 | | | | 4–1 |
| Zadar | 4–1 | 1–3 | 2–4 | 1–5 | 1–1 | 1–0 | 0–0 | 2–4 | 1–0 | 1–0 | | 4–0 | | | 1–1 | 1–2 | 3–2 | | | | 1–1 | 2–2 | | |
| NK Zagreb | 0–1 | 1–0 | 0–1 | 1–1 | 2–1 | 0–2 | 2–1 | 0–1 | 1–2 | 2–1 | 2–1 | | 0–2 | 0–3 | | | | 2–4 | | 1–4 | | | 1–1 | |

Source: Sportnet.hr
Legend: Blue = home team win; Yellow = draw; Red = away team win.

== Top goalscorers ==
As of 21 July 2013; Source: Sportnet.hr UEFA.com

| Rank | Player | Club | Goals |
|---|---|---|---|
| 1 | (Croatia) Leon Benko | Rijeka | 19 |
| 2 | (Croatia) Andrej Kramarić | Lokomotiva | 15 |
| 3 | (Croatia) Sammir | Dinamo Zagreb | 13 |
| 4 | (Croatia) Besart Abdurahimi | NK Zagreb | 12 |
| 4 | (Croatia) Mislav Oršić | Inter Zaprešić | 12 |
| 6 | (Croatia) Goran Roce | Istra 1961 | 11 |
| 7 | (Croatia) Ante Rebić | RNK Split | 10 |
| 7 | (Croatia) Ante Budimir | Inter Zaprešić | 10 |
| 9 | (Croatia) Mijo Caktaš | Hajduk Split | 9 |
| 9 | (Croatia) Duje Čop | Dinamo Zagreb | 9 |

== Awards ==
=== Annual awards ===
| Award | Winner | Club |
|---|---|---|
| Player of the Season | (Croatia) Sammir | Dinamo Zagreb |
| Manager of the Season | (Croatia) Tomislav Ivković | Lokomotiva Zagreb |
| Young Player of the Season | (Croatia) Ante Rebić | RNK Split |
| Goalkeeper of the Season | (Croatia) Ivan Kelava | Dinamo Zagreb |

Team of the Year
| Goalkeeper | (Croatia) Ivan Kelava (Dinamo Zagreb) | | | |
| Defence | (Croatia) Šime Vrsaljko (Dinamo Zagreb) | (Croatia) Josip Šimunić (Dinamo Zagreb) | (Croatia) Ivica Križanac (RNK Split) | (Croatia) Antonio Milić (Hajduk Split) |
| Midfield | (Croatia) Franko Andrijašević (Hajduk Split) | (Croatia) Sammir (Dinamo Zagreb) | (Croatia) Domagoj Antolić (Lokomotiva) | (Croatia) Leon Benko (Rijeka) |
| Attack | (Croatia) Ante Rebić (RNK Split) | | (Croatia) Andrej Kramarić (Lokomotiva) | |

== Attendances ==
| # | Club | Average |
|---|---|---|
| 1 | Hajduk | 9,029 |
| 2 | Rijeka | 4,000 |
| 3 | Dinamo Zagreb | 3,063 |
| 4 | Istra | 2,744 |
| 5 | Osijek | 1,731 |
| 6 | Cibalia | 1,581 |
| 7 | Slaven | 1,521 |
| 8 | Zadar | 1,463 |
| 9 | Zagreb | 1,225 |
| 10 | Zaprešić | 1,116 |
| 11 | Radnički | 1,012 |
| 12 | Lokomotiva | 582 |

== See also ==
- 2012–13 Croatian Second Football League
- 2012–13 Croatian Football Cup
