= Damir Šovšić =

Bosnian-born Croatian footballer

Personal information
- Full name: Damir Šovšić
- Date of birth: 5 February 1990 (age 36)
- Place of birth: Goražde, SR Bosnia and Herzegovina, SFR Yugoslavia
- Height: 1.77 m (5 ft 10 in)
- Position: Midfielder

Team information
- Current team: Radnik Surdulica
- Number: 10

Youth career
- –2004: Goražde
- 2004–2007: Sarajevo
- 2007–2009: Zagreb

Senior career*
Years	Team	Apps	(Gls)
2009–2013	NK Zagreb	121	(10)
2013–2016	Lokomotiva	57	(8)
2015	→ Dinamo Zagreb (loan)	5	(0)
2015	→ Dinamo Zagreb II (loan)	2	(0)
2016–2017	Dinamo Zagreb	9	(0)
2016	Dinamo Zagreb II	1	(0)
2016–2017	→ Hapoel Tel Aviv (loan)	12	(1)
2017–2018	Suwon Bluewings	21	(0)
2018	Sandecja Nowy Sącz	9	(0)
2018–2020	Zrinjski Mostar	18	(2)
2020–2023	Sandecja Nowy Sącz	59	(6)
2023	Cheonan City	23	(1)
2024–	Radnik Surdulica	0	(0)

International career
2006–2007	Bosnia and Herzegovina U17	2	(0)
2011	Croatia U21	2	(0)
- * Club domestic league appearances and goals as of 20:48, 13 December 2023 (UTC)

Damir Šovšić (born 5 February 1990) is a Bosnian-born Croatian professional footballer who plays as a midfielder for Serbian SuperLiga club Radnik Surdulica.

== Club career ==
Šovšić was signed by NK Zagreb from Bosnian side FK Sarajevo in 2008 and immediately signed a professional contract and joined the Zagreb first team, despite being just 18 years of age. At Zagreb, Šovšić became a vital part of their midfield for many years and after their unexpected relegation from the Croatian First Division in the 2012-13 season, NK Lokomotiva paid a transfer fee of about €500,000 to sign the player and keep him in the 1.HNL. In August 2015, he left Lokomotiva for Dinamo Zagreb. On 25 September 2015, he made a league debut for Dinamo Zagreb against NK Osijek, entering the game as a substitute on the home field.

In February 2017, Šovšić joined South Korean side Suwon Samsung Bluewings after terminating his contract with Dinamo Zagreb by mutual consent.

On 25 September 2020, he returned to Sandecja Nowy Sącz in Poland. On 4 January 2023, his contract was amicably terminated.

On 25 January 2023, Šovšić joined South Korean K League 2 team Cheonan City FC.

== Honours ==
Dinamo Zagreb

- 1. HNL: 2015–16
- Croatian Cup: 2015–16
