= Milorad Rajović =

Serbian footballer

Personal information
- Full name: Milorad Rajović
- Date of birth: 13 May 1955
- Place of birth: Crvenka, FPR Yugoslavia
- Date of death: 12 January 2016 (aged 60)
- Place of death: Novi Sad, Serbia
- Position: Midfielder

Youth career
- Crvenka

Senior career*
Years	Team	Apps	(Gls)
1973–1977	Crvenka	86	(11)
1977–1978	BSK Slavonski Brod	31	(4)
1978–1986	Dinamo Vinkovci	197	(33)
1986–1987	Apollon Athens	14	(0)
Total		328	(48)
- * Club domestic league appearances and goals

Milorad Rajović (Serbian Cyrillic: Милорад Рајовић; 13 May 1955 – 12 January 2016) was a Serbian footballer.

== Career ==
Rajović began his career with his home town club FK Crvenka. He also played for BSK Slavonski Brod before becoming a professional with Dinamo Vinkovici in the Yugoslav First League, making his debut against OFK Beograd on 15 August 1982. He went abroad in 1986, joining Apollon Athens in the Super League Greece.

== Personal life ==
His son is Zoran Rajović.
