= Marko Pervan =

Croatian professional footballer (born 1996)

Personal information
- Date of birth: 4 April 1996 (age 30)
- Place of birth: Metković, Croatia
- Height: 1.80 m (5 ft 11 in)
- Position: Attacking midfielder

Team information
- Current team: Cibalia
- Number: 21

Youth career
- 2003–2009: NK Međugorje
- 2010: Neretva
- 2010–2012: Adriatic Split
- 2012–2014: RNK Split

Senior career*
Years	Team	Apps	(Gls)
2014–2016	RNK Split	14	(0)
2015	→ Imotski (loan)	12	(0)
2016	→ Šibenik (loan)	8	(0)
2016–2018	Cibalia	35	(8)
2018–2019	Osijek	8	(0)
2019	→ Skënderbeu (loan)	14	(4)
2019–2020	Botev Plovdiv	18	(3)
2020	Široki Brijeg	19	(3)
2021–2022	Korona Kielce	23	(0)
2022	Široki Brijeg	5	(0)
2022–2023	Leotar	14	(1)
2023	Sloboda Tuzla	13	(0)
2023–2024	Gloria Buzău	11	(2)
2024–	Cibalia	59	(8)
- * Club domestic league appearances and goals as of 16 June 2026

Marko Pervan (born 4 April 1996) is a Croatian professional footballer who plays as an attacking midfielder for Cibalia.

== Career ==
Pervan started training with his father, a coach and a former football player, at NK Međugorje. In 2010 he went to nearby Metković, before moving on to the newly established Adriatic Split academy. In 2012, Pervar joined the top-tier RNK Split academy.

Pervan started his professional career with Split in the 1. HNL in 2014. After two seasons with the club, which also included a half-season loan stints with Imotski and Šibenik, he joined Cibalia. On 19 February 2018, Pervan was transferred to Osijek. While at Osijek, he was loaned out to Skënderbeu. In July 2019, he joined Bulgarian First League club Botev Plovdiv. He left Botev in January 2020.

On 10 February 2020, Pervan signed a one-year contract with Bosnian Premier League club Široki Brijeg. He made his official debut and scored his first goal for Široki Brijeg in a 2–2 league draw against Borac Banja Luka on 23 February 2020. Pervan left Široki Brijeg in December 2020.

On 19 January 2021, Pervan joined Polish I liga club Korona Kielce on a deal until June 2022. On 28 February 2022, he left the club by mutual consent.

== Honours ==
Korona Kielce II

- IV liga Świętokrzyskie: 2021–22
