= Darko Raić-Sudar =

Association football player (born 1972)

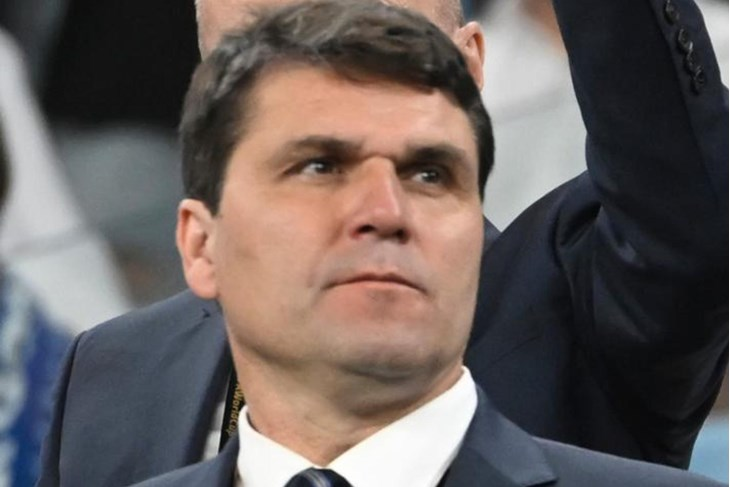
- Raić-Sudar in 2023

Personal information
- Date of birth: 7 November 1972 (age 54)
- Place of birth: Bruchsal, Germany
- Position: Midfielder

Team information
- Current team: Rijeka (sports director)

Youth career
- NK Osijek

Senior career*
Years	Team	Apps	(Gls)
1991–1997	Cibalia	114	(14)
1997–1999	Osijek	18	(3)
1998–1999	→ Cibalia (loan)	16	(3)
1999–2001	Maccabi Netanya	71	(10)
2001–2002	Bnei Yehuda	20	(2)
2002–2003	Hapoel Nof HaGalil	25	(3)
2003–2004	Cibalia	7	(0)
2004–2008	Istra 1961	121	(11)
Total		392	(46)

International career
1992	Croatia U21	4	(0)

Managerial career
- 2016: Istra 1961 (caretaker)
- 2016–2017: Istra 1961 (assistant)
- 2017–2018: Istra 1961
- 2023–: Rijeka (sports director)
- * Club domestic league appearances and goals

Darko Raić-Sudar (born 7 November 1972) is a Croatian football manager and former player. Born in Germany, he made four appearances for the Croatia U21 national team.

== Managerial career ==
In 2016 Raić-Sudar started his coaching career as the caretaker manager of Croatian First Football League team NK Istra 1961.

In also year, he became the Istra 1961 assistant manager of Marijo Tot, and later of Goran Tomić.

Following the pre-season of the 2017–18 season he was appointed the head coach, after sacking of Marijo Tot. He was sacked in July 2018. He was named sports director of Rijeka in April 2023.

== Honours ==
Osijek

- Croatian Cup: 1998–99
