= Dario Rugašević =

Croatian footballer

Personal information
- Date of birth: 29 January 1991 (age 35)
- Place of birth: Vinkovci, SFR Yugoslavia
- Height: 1.81 m (5 ft 11 in)
- Position: Left-back

Team information
- Current team: BSK Bijelo Brdo
- Number: 3

Youth career
- 2002–2009: Cibalia

Senior career*
Years	Team	Apps	(Gls)
2009–2013	Cibalia	80	(0)
2013–2015	RNK Split	61	(0)
2016	Cibalia	9	(0)
2016–2017	Gaz Metan Mediaș	25	(0)
2017–2018	Piast Gliwice	10	(0)
2018–2020	Zrinjski Mostar	18	(0)
2020	Tuzla City	18	(0)
2021	Cibalia	11	(1)
2020	Radomlje	15	(0)
2022-2023	Cibalia	16	(0)
2023–2024	Vukovar 1991	47	(1)
2024–	BSK Bijelo Brdo	0	(0)

International career
2007	Croatia U16	2	(0)
2007	Croatia U17	1	(0)
2009	Croatia U18	8	(1)
2009–2010	Croatia U19	17	(0)
2010	Croatia U20	1	(0)
2013	Croatia U21	1	(0)
- * Club domestic league appearances and goals as of 29 January 2024

Dario Rugašević (born 29 January 1991) is a Croatian professional footballer who plays as a left-back for BSK Bijelo Brdo in the Croatian Second Football League.

== Club career ==
A product of Cibalia academy, Rugašević joined the first team in the 2009–10 season and had his professional debut on 25 July 2009 in a league match against NK Zadar, and went on to appear in 17 matches for the club in his first professional season.

On 9 August 2017, he signed a contract with Piast Gliwice. After Piast, Rugašević also played for Bosnian Premier League clubs Zrinjski Mostar and Tuzla City.

== International career ==
Rugašević was a Croatia youth international having earned caps with all of the youth teams from with the Croatia under-16 team onwards.
