= NK Graničar Županja =

Croatian football club

NK Graničar
- Full name: Nogometni Klub Graničar Županja
- Founded: 1920
- Ground: Stadion u Spomen "Prve Nogometne Lopte"
- Capacity: 2,000
- Manager: Dražen Ilić
- League: Treća HNL – East
- 2021–22: 10th

NK Graničar is a Croatian football club, based in the town of Županja in Slavonia.

== History ==
Nogometni Klub Graničar was founded in 1920 in Županja as HNK Graničar, which is one of the most important sports symbols of today Županja.

Županja is known as the first place where football was played within the Kingdom of Croatia and Slavonia. Namely, the economic interests and wealth of Slavonia attracted factory workers from England in Županja in 1880, who brought with them the first football. They conceived in Županja playing football, and in the absence of a sufficient number of players in the "ball" included the local population, mainly employees, but also workers on the felling and delivery of oak logs to the tanning factory in Županja.

Most of the information about the founding of the club is from the legacy of documents and diary entries of Đuko Verner (1908– 1995), a longtime player and board member of the club. According to his data, the first usable ball, which did not originate from the legacy of the English, was bought by the People of Županja in 1920 in Sombor. Interestingly, they used pig bladders for it, which they acquired from local butchers.

Due to poor organization and irregular training, the club briefly reorganized and renamed the club to HŠK Jadran in 1922, but the original name Graničar was returned in 1926 and it was also named Croatia from 1936 to 1939. In 1926, the club joined the Football Subfederation. The games were played at the gendarmerie garden and fair. The blue color of the jerseys was repeatedly highlighted as the club's color already in those first years of activity.

After World War II Županja found itself within the framework of communist Yugoslavia. In the first years of the post-war period, the authorities confiscated the property left over from the tannins factory. As in 1945 the Yugoslav government closed all existing sports clubs and created new physicultural societies in their place, from 1947 the Dodgeball court became the former land of the tannins factory, which was donated to the club under the then name "Fiskulturno društvo Graničar" by the wife of the owner of the tannin factory Katarina Hepburn, and a stadium was built on it in the same year, and the stands were moved from the old playground to the fair, renovated and officially opened in 1949.

In the 1970s, Graničar experienced its first golden years. The golden jubilee – 50 years since the foundation of the club was celebrated, and great sporting successes were achieved. The club achieved success in the Posavina part of the Slavonian League, and in the season 1975/76 it experienced its greatest success until then, when with a victory over NK Ruškogorac from Ilok achieved placement in the Croatian Football League – group north. With the new reorganization in 1979, NK Graničar moved to the Unified Football League of Slavonia and Baranja. The 1980s began with a big ceremony for the 100th anniversary of football in Croatia and then Yugoslavia, and the stadium of NK Graničar played an important role and hosted numerous revue matches.

After a weaker period, in the early 2000s NK Graničar experienced a rise and since the 2005/2006 season it has competed in the Second Croatian Football League North. Later the club settled down mainly in the Third Football League.

In July 2018 Dražen Ilić replaced Hrvoje Bušić as manager of the club./

== Honours ==
(Croatia) Treća HNL – East:

- Winners (1): 2004–05

== Current squad ==
As of 23 April 2023

Note: Flags indicate national team as defined under FIFA eligibility rules; some limited exceptions apply. Players may hold more than one non-FIFA nationality.

No.	Pos.	Nation	Player
1	GK	(Croatia) CRO	Marko Ivkić
2	DF	(Croatia) CRO	Ivan Kovačević
3		(Croatia) CRO	Marin Spajić
4	DF	(Croatia) CRO	Hrvoje Miličević
5	DF	(Croatia) CRO	Slaven Pejčić
6	MF	(Croatia) CRO	Stjepan Babić
7	FW	(Croatia) CRO	Domagoj Džoić
8	DF	(Croatia) CRO	Filip Cerovski
9	MF	(Croatia) CRO	Hrvoje Kovačević
10	FW	(Croatia) CRO	Josip Lešić

No.	Pos.	Nation	Player
11	FW	(Croatia) CRO	Marino Lazar
12	GK	(Croatia) CRO	Bruno Lešić
13		(Croatia) CRO	Ilija Gagulić
14	FW	(Croatia) CRO	Hrvoje Hodak
15	FW	(Croatia) CRO	Josip Lotar
16	DF	(Croatia) CRO	Luka Prnjak
17	MF	(Croatia) CRO	Aron Smolčić
18	MF	(Croatia) CRO	Gabriel Dretvić
19	MF	(Croatia) CRO	Marko Pastuović
22	DF	(Croatia) CRO	Petar Duje Berač
