= Luka Begonja =

Croatian footballer

Personal information
- Full name: Luka Begonja
- Date of birth: 23 May 1992 (age 34)
- Place of birth: Zadar, Croatia
- Height: 1.87 m (6 ft 1 1/2 in)
- Position: Central midfielder

Team information
- Current team: Zadar

Youth career
- 2003–2011: Zadar

Senior career*
Years	Team	Apps	(Gls)
2008–2014	Zadar	98	(12)
2014–2018	Lokomotiva	50	(3)
2017	→ Sesvete (loan)	12	(4)
2017–2018	→ Široki Brijeg (loan)	27	(1)
2018–2019	Široki Brijeg	21	(2)
2019–	Zadar		

International career
2009–2010	Croatia U18	9	(0)
2010–2011	Croatia U19	6	(0)
2011–2013	Croatia U20	2	(1)
2013	Croatia U21	3	(0)
- * Club domestic league appearances and goals as of 20 April 2019

Luka Begonja (born 23 May 1992) is a Croatian professional footballer who plays for NK Zadar as a midfielder.

== Club career ==
On 14 April 2010, Begonja made his professional debut against NK Slaven Belupo where he was substituted in the 65th minute.
