= Miroslav Žitnjak =

Croatian footballer

Personal information
- Full name: Miroslav Žitnjak
- Date of birth: 15 September 1967 (age 59)
- Place of birth: Đakovo, SFR Yugoslavia
- Height: 6 ft 2 in (1.88 m)
- Position: Goalkeeper

Youth career
- Jedinstvo Đakovo

Senior career*
Years	Team	Apps	(Gls)
1986–1992	Osijek	102	(0)
1992–1994	Zagreb	50	(0)
1994–1996	Osijek	61	(0)
1995–1999	União Leiria	93	(3)
1999–2000	Osijek	0	(0)

International career
1988–1990	Yugoslavia U21		
1992	Croatia	1	(0)

Managerial career
- 2006–2007: Osijek
- 2013: Osijek (caretaker)
- * Club domestic league appearances and goals

Miroslav Žitnjak (born 15 September 1967) is a Croatian retired goalkeeper. He has worked at the Osijek football academy since 2004.

== Club career ==
After playing with NK Osijek in the Yugoslav First League, he moved to NK Zagreb in 1992 and played in the Prva HNL with them and afterwards again Osijek until the winter break of the 1995–96 season when he moved abroad, signing with Portuguese Primeira Liga side U.D. Leiria which he represented until 2000.

== International career ==
He represented Yugoslav U-21 team until 1990, and afterwards played one match for the Croatia national team in July 1992 against Australia.
