= Josip Milardović =

Croatian footballer (born 1982)

Personal information
- Date of birth: 10 January 1982 (age 44)
- Place of birth: Odžak, SFR Yugoslavia
- Height: 1.84 m (6 ft 1/2 in)
- Positions: Centre back; defensive midfielder

Youth career
- Osijek

Senior career*
Years	Team	Apps	(Gls)
2001–2007	Osijek	127	(8)
2007–2008	Međimurje	31	(5)
2008–2010	Cibalia	54	(6)
2010–2011	Slaven Belupo	43	(4)
2012	Guangdong Sunray Cave	11	(2)
2012–2013	Inter Zaprešić	25	(1)
2013–2015	Cibalia	27	(1)
2015	T-Team	22	(2)
2016-2017	Đakovo Croatia		

International career^{‡}
2004	Croatia U21	1	(0)
- * Club domestic league appearances and goals as of 4 December 2012 ‡ National team caps and goals as of 28 April 2004

Josip Milardović (born 10 January 1982) is a Croatian retired football midfielder.

== Career ==
Milardović established himself as a fixture in the NK Osijek first team as a 20-year-old in the 2002–2003 season, becoming the team's captain in 2006. He was called up for a trial at Amkar Perm in January 2007, but the deal fell through as he still had six months left of his contract. After his contract expired he joined Međimurje for the 2007–2008 season, but left the club after it was relegated, joining Cibalia Vinkovci. After two seasons in the club, he left for another Prva HNL team, Slaven Belupo in the summer of 2010, signing a two-year contract.
