= Petar Mišić (footballer) =

Croatian footballer (born 1994)

Personal information
- Date of birth: 24 July 1994 (age 32)
- Place of birth: Bruchsal, Germany
- Height: 1.76 m (5 ft 9 in)
- Position: Left midfielder

Team information
- Current team: Cibalia
- Number: 10

Youth career
- 2000–2007: Cibalia
- 2007–2008: Dilj
- 2008–2012: Cibalia
- 2012: → Dinamo Zagreb (loan)

Senior career*
Years	Team	Apps	(Gls)
2012–2013	Cibalia	30	(2)
2013–2015	Dinamo Zagreb	0	(0)
2013–2014	→ Lokomotiva (loan)	45	(6)
2015	→ Slaven Belupo (loan)	17	(1)
2015	Lokomotiva	5	(0)
2016–2017	Split	14	(2)
2017	Cibalia	17	(0)
2017–2020	Aarau	83	(11)
2021–2023	Tuzla City	65	(12)
2023–2025	Zrinjski Mostar	6	(1)
2024	→ Široki Brijeg (loan)	10	(3)
2025	→ Cibalia (loan)	8	(1)
2025–	Cibalia	28	(2)

International career
2011	Croatia U17	3	(0)
2012	Croatia U18	2	(0)
2012–2013	Croatia U19	8	(0)
2013–2015	Croatia U21	11	(2)
- * Club domestic league appearances and goals as of 15 June 2026

Petar Mišić (born 24 July 1994) is a Croatian professional footballer who plays as a left midfielder for Cibalia.

== Honours ==
Dinamo Zagreb

- 1. HNL: 2014–15
- Croatian Cup: 2014–15
