= Tomislav Jurić =

Croatian footballer

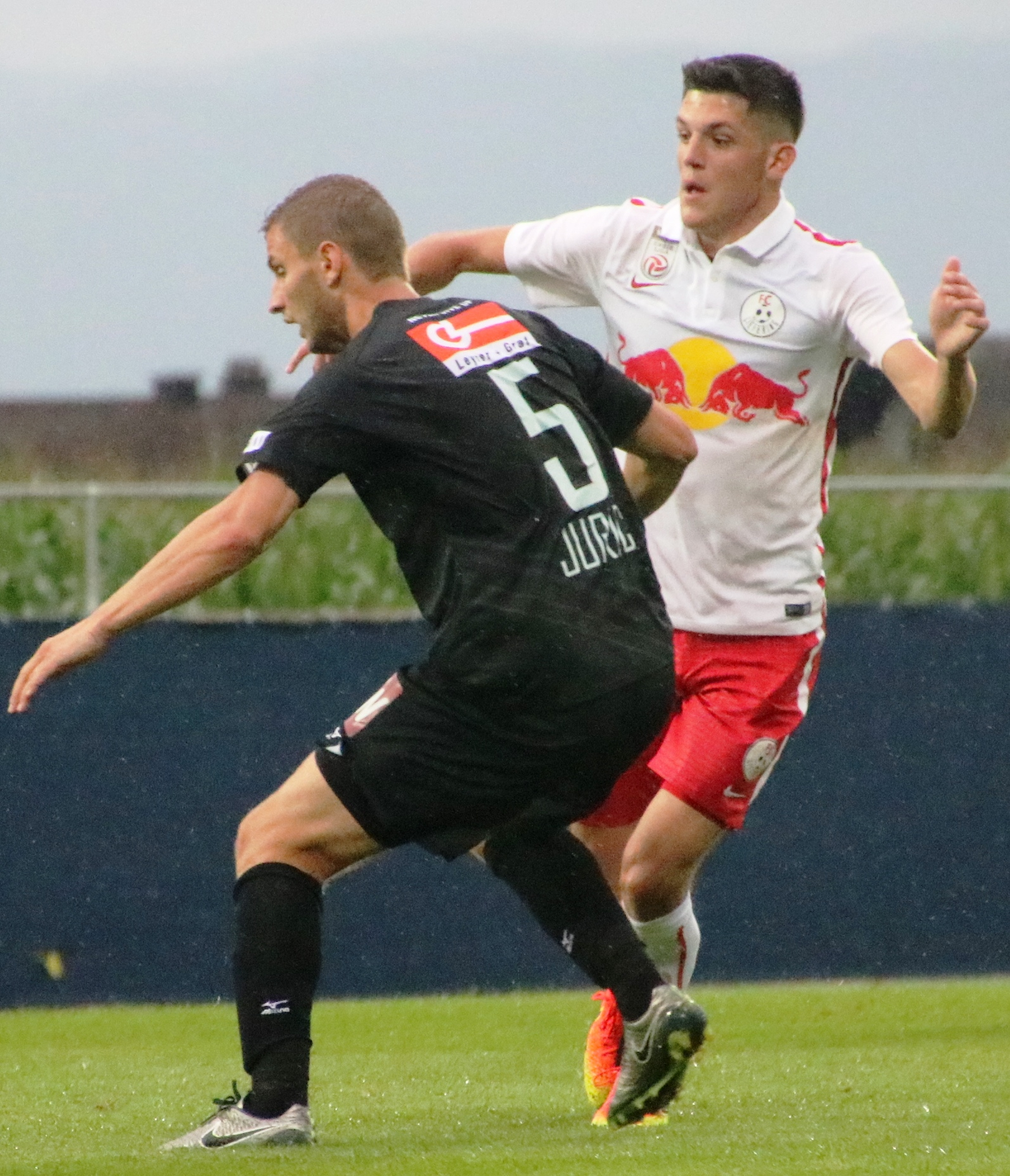

Personal information
- Full name: Tomislav Jurić
- Date of birth: 9 April 1990 (age 36)
- Place of birth: Kutina, SFR Yugoslavia
- Height: 1.86 m (6 ft 1 in)
- Position: Midfielder

Team information
- Current team: Čepin

Youth career
- –2008: Cibalia

Senior career*
Years	Team	Apps	(Gls)
2008–2013	Cibalia	88	(6)
2013–2014	Zagreb	1	(0)
2014–2015	Krka	16	(1)
2015	Brașov	14	(0)
2015–2017	Horn	44	(5)
2017–2018	SV Stripfing	20	(2)
2019–2022	USV Scheiblingkirchen-Warth	50	(9)
2022–	Čepin		

International career
	Croatia U17	1	(0)
	Croatia U19	10	(1)
- * Club domestic league appearances and goals as of 1 July 2022

Tomislav Jurić (born 8 April 1990) is a Croatian football midfielder who plays for Čepin.

== Club career ==
Jurić has had spells in Slovenia and Romania as well as in Austria where he last played for fourth-tier side USV Scheiblingkirchen-Warth.
