= Frane Vitaić =

Croatian footballer

Personal information
- Full name: Frane Vitaić
- Date of birth: 7 June 1982 (age 44)
- Place of birth: Split, SFR Yugoslavia
- Height: 1.88 m (6 ft 2 in)
- Position: Midfielder

Youth career
- Hajduk Split

Senior career*
Years	Team	Apps	(Gls)
2004	Hajduk Split	0	(0)
2005	Mosor	12	(1)
2006–2007	Osijek	9	(0)
2007	Omiš		
2007–2008	Šibenik	29	(8)
2008–2009	Oțelul Galați	17	(1)
2009–2010	RNK Split	20	(5)
2010–2013	Cibalia	77	(9)
2013–2015	Osijek	20	(1)
2015–2019	Cibalia	74	(23)
Total		258	(48)
- * Club domestic league appearances and goals as of 2 March 2021

Frane Vitaić (born 7 June 1982) is a Croatian retired footballer.

== Club career ==
=== Early years ===
Vitaić went to the Hajduk and NK Mosor youth schools, but never got to play for the Hajduk senior team.

Vitaić previously played for NK Osijek, HNK Šibenik and HNK Cibalia in the Croatian First Football League and for RNK Split and Cibalia in the Croatian Second Football League.

Vitaić was the top scorer of the 2015–16 Croatian Second Football League with 15 goals to his account.

== Personal life ==
His brother Ante Vitaić is also a football player.

== Honours ==
RNK Split

- Croatian Second Football League: 2009–10

Cibalia

- Croatian Second Football League: 2015–16
