= Stadion HNK Cibalia =

Football stadium in Vinkovci, Croatia

Coordinates: 45°17′01″N 18°47′51″E

Stadion Cibalia
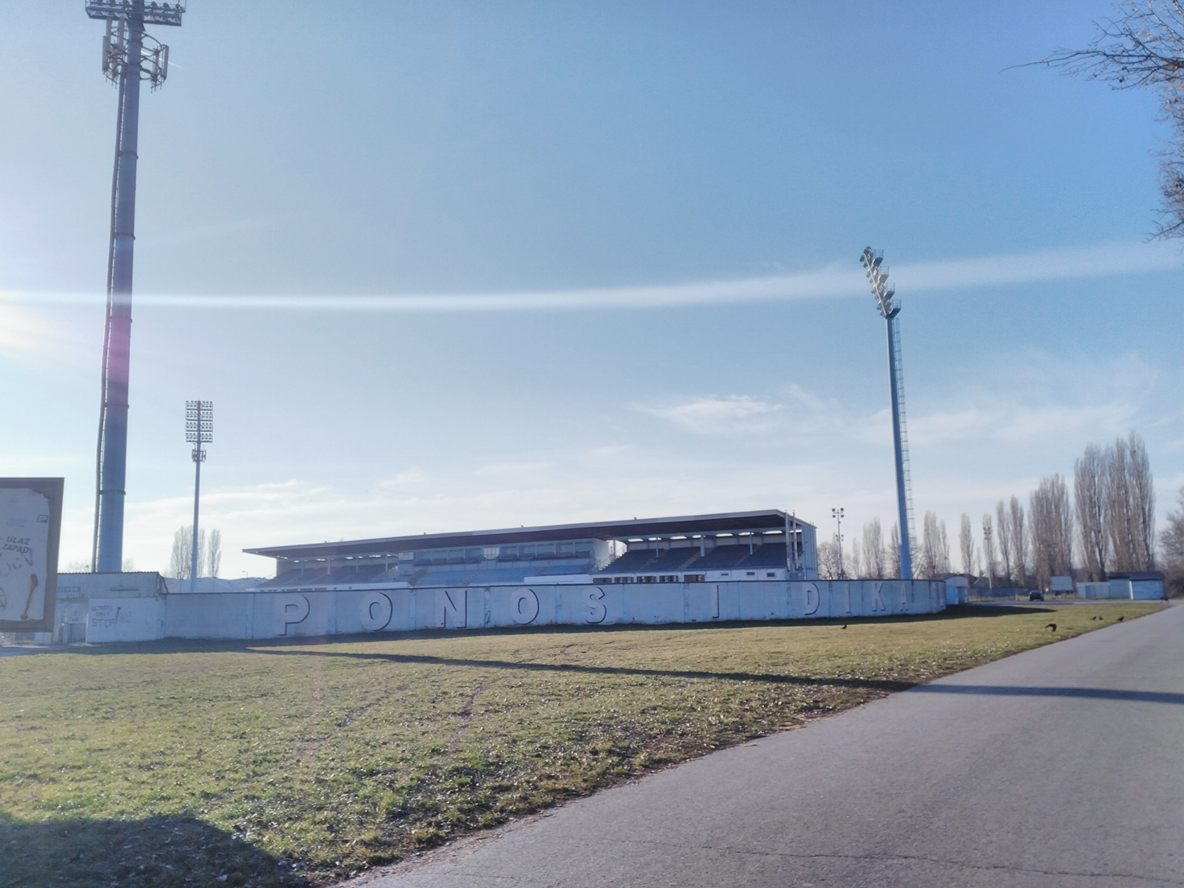
- Interactive map of Stadion Cibalia
- Former names: Stadion Mladosti
- Location: Vinkovci, Croatia
- Capacity: 10,000

Construction
- Built: 1966
- Renovated: 1982, 2003, 2008, 2010

Tenants
- Cibalia (1966–present); HNK Vukovar 1991 (2025–); Croatia national football team (2009–present)

Stadion Cibalia is a multi-purpose stadium in Vinkovci, Croatia. It is currently used mostly for football matches and is the home ground of HNK Cibalia. It has a grass court, surrounded with a clay running surface, and stands, a part of which is covered. The stadium has a seating capacity of 10,000, of which 6,000 are unroofed, 2,175 are roofed and another 120 are part of the luxury suite.

It is located in the southern part of the city, across the river Bosut from the city centre. It was built in 1966, and expanded in 1982, when Dinamo Vinkovci entered the Yugoslav First League for the first time. At the time the total capacity was 18,000, but mostly standing-only. It was last upgraded in 2003, when two sets of stands were fitted with a total of 3,700 seats.

The stadium was named Stadion Mladosti (Youth Stadium) up to 1992, and it is still common for people to refer to it this way.

In the 2025–26 season, HNK Vukovar 1991, having been promoted to Croatia's top-tier football league, will play its home matches at Stadion HNK Cibalia, as their own stadium does not meet league requirements. The club’s promotion represents a significant milestone, and the use of Stadion HNK Cibalia highlights its role as an important venue in Croatian football.

== International matches ==
Date	Competition	Teams	Score
14 November 2009	Friendly	Croatia vs. Liechtenstein	5–0
