= NK Dilj =

Croatian football club

NK Dilj Vinkovci
- Full name: Nogometni Klub Dilj Vinkovci
- Founded: 1950; 76 years ago
- Ground: Stadion NK Dilj
- Capacity: 3,000
- League: First League of Vukovar-Syrmia County
Home colours	Away colours

NK Dilj is a professional football club from the city of Vinkovci. This club competes in the First League of Vukovar-Syrmia County.

== History ==
NK Dilj was founded in 1950 in the midst of "Dilj Vinkovci".

By establishing the club, with occasional interruptions, including the competition municipalities of Vinkovci, competition in the worker's sports games and football tournaments.

From 1972 NK Dilj year begins constantly compete in the lowest rank. In 1984 realized sales in the then Municipal League of Vinkovci.

Entering the same order to improve conditions and infrastructure construction. In 1988 the club enters into inter-municipal league. Among the most significant achievements from this period is the conquest of the Municipal Cup in 1989.

Creating of HNL NK Dilj begins competition in the Treća HNL, to the 1996–97 season. become a member of the Druga HNL – North, a second season later, the newly HNL – East that same season, and leaves. The greatest successes achieved performances at Druga HNL – North for a period of 2002–2006, and at the end of the 2005–06 season. due to reorganisation of competition knocked out in the Četvrta HNL – East which still occurs.

The name of the fan group is Cigla Boys.

== Honours ==
- (Croatia) Treća HNL – West:
  - Champions (1): 2001–02
