= 2014–15 Croatian First Football League =

Croatian football league, 2014–15

MAXtv Prva Liga
- Season: 2014–15
- Champions: Dinamo Zagreb
- Relegated: Zadar
- Champions League: Dinamo Zagreb
- Europa League: Rijeka; Hajduk Split; Lokomotiva
- Matches: 180
- Goals: 519 (2.88 per match)
- Top goalscorer: Andrej Kramarić (21)
- Biggest home win: Hajduk Split 6–0 Zadar; Rijeka 6–0 Lokomotiva
- Biggest away win: Zagreb 0–6 Lokomotiva
- Highest scoring: Hajduk 5–3 Istra 1961
- Longest winning run: Dinamo Zagreb (6)
- Longest unbeaten run: Dinamo Zagreb (36)
- Longest winless run: Istra 1961, RNK Split (11)
- Longest losing run: Lokomotiva, Zadar (5)
- Highest attendance: 16,072 (Hajduk 2–3 Dinamo)
- Lowest attendance: 100 (Zagreb 1–0 S. Belupo)
- Average attendance: 2,733
- All statistics correct as of 30 May 2015.

The 2014–15 Croatian First Football League (also known as 1. HNL; officially styled as the MAXtv Prva Liga for sponsorship reasons) was the 24th season of the Croatian First Football League, the national championship for men's association football teams in Croatia, since its establishment in 1992. The season started on 18 July 2014 and ended on 30 May 2015. 10 teams contested for the title.

Dinamo Zagreb successfully defended its ninth consecutive 2014 title in the final against Sesvete.

== Teams ==
The following is a complete list of teams who will contest the 2014–15 Prva HNL.

Locations of teams in 2014–15 Prva HNL

=== Stadia and locations ===
Stadium	City	Home club	Licensed club(s)	Capacity
Maksimir	Zagreb	Dinamo Zagreb		38,079
Poljud	Split	Hajduk Split		34,448
Gradski vrt	Osijek	Osijek		22,050
Kantrida	Rijeka	Rijeka		12,600
Aldo Drosina	Pula	Istra 1961		10,000
Kranjčevićeva	Zagreb	Zagreb	Lokomotiva	8,850
Stanovi	Zadar	Zadar		6,000
Park mladeži	Split	RNK Split		4,075
Gradski stadion	Koprivnica	Slaven Belupo		3,134

=== Personnel and kits ===
Team	Manager	Captain	Kit manufacturer	Shirt sponsor
Dinamo Zagreb	(Croatia) Zoran Mamić	(North Macedonia) Arijan Ademi	Puma	—
Hajduk Split	(Croatia) Hari Vukas	(Croatia) Mario Maloča	Macron	Tommy
Istra 1961	(Croatia) Igor Pamić	(Croatia) Jure Obšivač	Errea	—
Lokomotiva	(Croatia) Marko Pinčić	(Croatia) Mario Musa	Nike	—
Osijek	(Croatia) Ivo Šušak	(Croatia) Hrvoje Kurtović	Jako	—
Rijeka	(Slovenia) Matjaž Kek	(Croatia) Dario Knežević	Jako	—
Slaven Belupo	(Croatia) Ante Čačić	(Croatia) Mato Grgić	Adidas	Belupo
RNK Split	(Croatia) Zoran Vulić	(Croatia) Danijel Zagorac	Jako	Skladgradnja
Zadar	(Croatia) Igor Štimac	(Croatia) Jure Jerbić	Lotto	Hotel Kolovare
NK Zagreb	(Croatia) Željko Kopić	(Croatia) Josip Jurendić	Kappa, Jako	—

=== Managerial changes ===
Team	Outgoing manager	Manner of departure	Date of vacancy	Replaced by	Date of appointment	Position in table
NK Zagreb	(Croatia) Vjekoslav Lokica	Contract expired	18 May 2014	(Croatia) Željko Kopić	9 June 2014	Pre-season
Zadar	(Croatia) Ferdo Milin	Resigned	25 August 2014	(Croatia) Miroslav Blažević	1 September 2014	9th
Slaven Belupo	(Croatia) Elvis Scoria	Sacked	30 October 2014	(Croatia) Ante Čačić	4 November 2014	10th
RNK Split	(Croatia) Ivan Matić	Removed from position	23 December 2014	(Croatia) Zoran Vulić	23 December 2014	6th
Zadar	(Croatia) Miroslav Blažević	Resigned	2 January 2015	(Croatia) Igor Štimac	7 January 2015	10th
Hajduk Split	(Croatia) Igor Tudor	Resigned	4 February 2015	(Croatia) Hari Vukas (caretaker)	5 February 2015	3rd
Osijek	(Croatia) Tomislav Rukavina	Sacked	8 February 2015	(Croatia) Ivo Šušak	11 February 2015	10th
Hajduk Split	(Croatia) Hari Vukas (caretaker)	End of caretaker tenure	19 February 2015	(Croatia) Stanko Poklepović	19 February 2015	3rd
Hajduk Split	(Croatia) Stanko Poklepović	Sacked	13 April 2015	(Croatia) Goran Vučević (caretaker)	13 April 2015	4th
Hajduk Split	(Croatia) Goran Vučević (caretaker)	Removed from position	23 April 2015	(Croatia) Hari Vukas	24 April 2015	4th
Lokomotiva	(Croatia) Tomislav Ivković	Sacked	11 May 2015	(Croatia) Marko Pinčić (caretaker)	11 May 2015	4th

== League table ==
Pos	Team	Pld	W	D	L	GF	GA	GD	Pts	Qualification or relegation
1	Dinamo Zagreb (C)	36	26	10	0	85	21	+64	88	Qualification to Champions League second qualifying round
2	Rijeka	36	22	9	5	76	29	+47	75	Qualification to Europa League second qualifying round
3	Hajduk Split (Note: Hajduk Split were deducted 3 points for not showing up for the match against Dinamo Zagreb in the 16th round.)	36	15	8	13	59	56	+3	50	Qualification to Europa League first qualifying round
4	Lokomotiva	36	13	7	16	59	68	−9	46	Qualification to Europa League first qualifying round
5	NK Zagreb	36	13	7	16	45	54	−9	46	
6	Slaven Belupo	36	11	9	16	38	49	−11	42	
7	RNK Split	36	9	14	13	42	49	−7	41	
8	Osijek	36	10	6	20	42	59	−17	36	
9	Istra 1961	36	7	14	15	36	59	−23	35	Qualification to relegation play-off
10	Zadar (R)	36	8	8	20	37	75	−38	32	Relegation to Croatian Second Football League

Source: Sportnet.hr
Rules for classification: 1) points; 2) goal difference; 3) number of goals scored.
For deciding champions, qualification to UEFA Europa League and relegation: 1st points; 2nd head-to-head points; 3rd head-to-head goal difference; 4th head-to-head away goals scored
(C) Champions; (R) Relegated

== Results ==
Home \ Away	DIN	HAJ	IST	LOK	OSI	RIJ	SLA	SPL	ZAD	ZAG	DIN	HAJ	IST	LOK	OSI	RIJ	SLA	SPL	ZAD	ZAG
Dinamo Zagreb		3–0 (Note: Awarded as a 3–0 forfeit win to Dinamo Zagreb.)	2–0	3–0	5–0	3–0	4–0	1–0	5–0	1–1		4–0	4–1	2–1	3–0	4–0	3–2	2–0	2–0	2–0
Hajduk Split	2–3		1–1	2–2	2–1	1–1	2–0	2–1	6–0	0–2	1–1		5–3	2–1	3–2	1–2	2–1	1–2	2–2	1–0
Istra 1961	0–4	0–2		3–2	0–0	0–1	1–0	2–0	1–1	1–2	1–1	3–2		1–1	1–0	0–0	2–2	1–1	0–0	2–1
Lokomotiva	3–4	2–5	4–2		2–0	2–1	0–0	1–1	0–1	3–0	1–2	2–1	1–2		2–2	1–0	2–0	0–3	1–5	1–2
Osijek	1–2	2–0	1–1	1–4		0–1	2–3	1–1	4–1	1–0	1–1	0–1	1–0	0–2		0–0	3–2	4–0	2–1	1–0
Rijeka	1–2	4–2	3–1	6–0	2–1		3–0	1–1	6–1	3–0	2–2	3–0	3–0	5–0	3–0		1–1	2–0	4–0	4–1
Slaven Belupo	0–0	0–1	1–1	0–2	2–0	1–1		1–0	4–0	3–2	0–0	0–2	2–1	4–0	2–1	1–1		1–0	2–0	2–1
RNK Split	0–0	1–1	1–1	2–2	3–0	0–3	2–0		3–0	2–2	1–5	1–1	2–2	0–1	3–2	1–1	2–0		1–1	1–2
Zadar	1–3	0–3	1–1	2–5	2–1	0–1	4–0	1–2		2–2	0–1	2–0	2–0	2–2	3–1	0–2	1–0	1–1		0–1
NK Zagreb	0–0	2–2	1–0	2–0	1–2	1–3	2–1	1–1	3–0		1–1	2–0	4–0	0–6	0–4	1–2	1–0	1–2	3–0	

Source: Sportnet.hr
Legend: Blue = home team win; Yellow = draw; Red = away team win.

=== Relegation play-off ===
At the end of season, ninth placed Istra 1961 qualified for a home and away relegation playoff tie against Sesvete, runners-up of the 2014–15 Croatian Second Football League. However, Sesvete's managing board decided not to contest the tie, as their home stadium in Sesvete failed to get a licence for top-level football. As the club also refused to use Maksimir Stadium as a replacement venue for hosting home games, Istra 1961 automatically avoided relegation and qualified for 2015–16 Croatian First Football League.

== Top goalscorers ==
As of 31 May 2015; Source: Croatian Football Statistics UEFA.com

Rank	Player	Club(s)	Goals	Apps	Minutes played
1	(Croatia) Andrej Kramarić	Rijeka	21	18	1551
2	(Chile) Ángelo Henríquez	Dinamo Zagreb	20	25	1588
3	(Croatia) Dejan Radonjić	Istra 1961	16	23	1742
4	(Croatia) Gabrijel Boban	NK Zagreb	13	34	2867
5	(Croatia) Duje Čop	Dinamo Zagreb	12	15	1006
6	(Algeria) El Arbi Hillel Soudani	Dinamo Zagreb	11	23	1727
6	(Croatia) Marko Pjaca	Dinamo Zagreb	11	32	2261
8	(Serbia) Marko Mirić	Slaven Belupo	10	29	2008
8	(Croatia) Domagoj Pavičić	Lokomotiva, Dinamo Zagreb	10	30	2354
8	(Albania) Sokol Cikalleshi	RNK Split	10	32	2616

== Awards ==
=== Annual awards ===
Award	Winner	Club
Player of the Season	(Croatia) Marko Pjaca	Dinamo Zagreb
Manager of the Season	(Croatia) Zoran Mamić	Dinamo Zagreb
Young Player of the Season	(Croatia) Marko Pjaca	Dinamo Zagreb
Goalkeeper of the Season	(Croatia) Lovre Kalinić	Hajduk Split

Team of the Year
Goalkeeper	(Croatia) Dominik Livaković (NK Zagreb)			
Defence	(Croatia) Ivan Tomečak (Rijeka)	(Croatia) Matej Mitrović (Rijeka)	(Croatia) Marko Lešković (Rijeka)	(Croatia) Marin Leovac (Rijeka)
Midfield	(Croatia) Dejan Radonjić (Listra 1961)	(Croatia) Domagoj Pavičić (Dinamo Zagreb)	(North Macedonia) Arijan Ademi (Dinamo Zagreb)	(Croatia) Marko Pjaca (Dinamo Zagreb)
Midfield	(Croatia) Ante Ćorić (Dinamo Zagreb			
Attack	(Chile) Ángelo Henríquez (Dinamo Zagreb)			

== Attendances ==
#	Club	Average
1	Hajduk	8,056
2	Rijeka	5,133
3	Osijek	3,267
4	Dinamo Zagreb	3,048
5	Istra	2,306
6	Slaven	1,967
7	Zadar	1,550
8	Lokomotiva	1,356
9	Zagreb	1,042
10	Radnički	1,028

== See also ==
- 2014–15 Croatian Second Football League
- 2014–15 Croatian Football Cup
