= 2015–16 Croatian First Football League =

MAXtv Prva Liga
- Season: 2015–16
- Dates: 10 July 2015 – 14 May 2016
- Champions: Dinamo Zagreb
- Relegated: NK Zagreb
- Champions League: Dinamo Zagreb
- Europa League: Rijeka; Hajduk Split; Lokomotiva
- Matches: 180
- Goals: 410 (2.28 per match)
- Top goalscorer: Ilija Nestorovski (25)
- Biggest home win: Lokomotiva 6–1 Istra 1961; Rijeka 5–0 Osijek
- Biggest away win: Lokomotiva 0–4 Dinamo
- Highest scoring: Lokomotiva 6–1 Istra 1961
- Longest winning run: Dinamo Zagreb (12)
- Longest unbeaten run: Rijeka (22)
- Longest winless run: Istra 1961 (23)
- Longest losing run: Istra 1961, Osijek, NK Zagreb (4)
- Highest attendance: 24,621 (Hajduk Split 0–3 Rijeka)
- Lowest attendance: 138 (Zagreb 2–0 RNK Split)
- Total attendance: 442,952
- Average attendance: 2,461
- All statistics correct as of 14 May 2016.

The 2015–16 Croatian First Football League (also known as 1. HNL; officially styled as MAXtv Prva Liga for sponsorship reasons) was the 25th edition, since its establishment in 1992, of the Croatian First Football League national championship for men's football in Croatia. The season began on 10 July 2015 and ended on 14 May 2016. Ten teams contested in a quadruple round robin format, with each team playing every other team four times over 36 matches.

Dinamo Zagreb successfully defended its 10th consecutive title in 2015 title. At the end of the previous season Zadar were relegated, ending their eight-season spell in top flight. They were replaced by Inter Zaprešić, who returned to the top level after two seasons in the second division.

== Teams ==
On 20 April 2015, Croatian Football Federation announced that the first stage of licensing procedure for 2015–16 season was complete. For the 2015–16 Prva HNL, only six clubs were issued a top level license: Dinamo Zagreb, Hajduk Split, Lokomotiva, Rijeka, Slaven Belupo and NK Zagreb. These clubs were also issued a license for participation in UEFA competitions. In the second stage of licensing, clubs that were not licensed in the first stage appealed the decision. On 20 May 2015, all remaining Prva HNL clubs were granted top level license. Additionally, Istra 1961 and RNK Split obtained a license for UEFA competitions. Only three teams from Druga HNL acquired the top level license: Inter Zaprešić, Sesvete and Hrvatski Dragovoljac.

The following teams participated in the 2015–16 Prva HNL.

Locations of teams in 2015–16 Prva HNL

=== Stadia and locations ===
| Stadium | City | Home club | Licensed club(s) | Capacity |
|---|---|---|---|---|
| Maksimir | Zagreb | Dinamo Zagreb | | 38,079 |
| Poljud | Split | Hajduk Split | | 34,448 |
| ŠRC Zaprešić | Zaprešić | Inter Zaprešić | | 5,228 |
| Aldo Drosina | Pula | Istra 1961 | | 8,923 |
| Gradski vrt | Osijek | Osijek | | 22,050 |
| Rujevica | Rijeka | Rijeka | | 6,036 |
| Gradski stadion | Koprivnica | Slaven Belupo | | 3,134 |
| Park mladeži | Split | RNK Split | | 4,075 |
| Kranjčevićeva | Zagreb | NK Zagreb | Lokomotiva | 8,850 |

=== Personnel and kits ===
| Club | Manager | Captain | Kit manufacturer | Sponsors |
|---|---|---|---|---|
| Dinamo Zagreb | (Croatia) Zoran Mamić | (Croatia) Domagoj Antolić | Puma | |
| Hajduk Split | (Croatia) Damir Burić | (Croatia) Goran Milović | Macron | Tommy |
| Inter Zaprešić | (Croatia) Samir Toplak | (Croatia) Marko Ćosić | Joma | Veleučilište Baltazar Zaprešić |
| Istra 1961 | (Croatia) Andrej Panadić | (Croatia) Dario Tomić | Erreà | Croatia Osiguranje |
| Lokomotiva | (Croatia) Sreten Ćuk | (Croatia) Jerko Leko | Nike | Crodux |
| Osijek | (Croatia) Zoran Zekić | (Croatia) Hrvoje Kurtović | Jako | Osječko |
| Rijeka | (Slovenia) Matjaž Kek | (Croatia) Ivan Močinić | Jako | |
| Slaven Belupo | (Croatia) Željko Kopić | (Croatia) Mateas Delić | adidas | Belupo |
| RNK Split | (Croatia) Goran Sablić | (Croatia) Danijel Zagorac | Jako | Skladgradnja |
| NK Zagreb | (Croatia) Dražen Madunović | (Croatia) Valentino Stepčić | Kappa | |

=== Managerial changes ===
| Team | Outgoing manager | Manner of departure | Date of vacancy | Replaced by | Date of appointment | Position in table |
|---|---|---|---|---|---|---|
| Hajduk Split | (Croatia) Hari Vukas | Removed from position | 1 June 2015 | (Croatia) Damir Burić | 1 June 2015 | Pre-season |
| Osijek | (Croatia) Ivo Šušak | Contract expired | 1 June 2015 | (Croatia) Dražen Besek | 14 June 2015 | Pre-season |
| Slaven Belupo | (Croatia) Ante Čačić | Signed by Lokomotiva | 3 June 2015 | (Croatia) Željko Kopić | 10 June 2015 | Pre-season |
| Lokomotiva | (Croatia) Marko Pinčić (caretaker) | End of caretaker tenure | 3 June 2015 | (Croatia) Ante Čačić | 3 June 2015 | Pre-season |
| NK Zagreb | (Croatia) Željko Kopić | Signed by Slaven Belupo | 9 June 2015 | (Croatia) Goran Vincetić | 9 June 2015 | Pre-season |
| Osijek | (Croatia) Dražen Besek | Sacked | 1 September 2015 | (Croatia) Zoran Zekić | 1 September 2015 | 9th |
| Lokomotiva | (Croatia) Ante Čačić | Signed by Croatia | 21 September 2015 | (Croatia) Sreten Ćuk | 22 September 2015 | 5th |
| RNK Split | (Croatia) Zoran Vulić | Mutual consent | 30 September 2015 | (Croatia) Goran Sablić | 30 September 2015 | 4th |
| Istra 1961 | (Croatia) Igor Pamić | Sacked | 5 October 2015 | (Croatia) Robert Rubčić (caretaker) | 5 October 2015 | 7th |
| Istra 1961 | (Croatia) Robert Rubčić (caretaker) | End of caretaker tenure | 4 January 2016 | (Croatia) Andrej Panadić | 4 January 2016 | 8th |

== League table ==
| Pos | Team | Pld | W | D | L | GF | GA | GD | Pts | Qualification or relegation |
|---|---|---|---|---|---|---|---|---|---|---|
| 1 | Dinamo Zagreb (C) | 36 | 26 | 7 | 3 | 67 | 19 | +48 | 85 | Qualification for the Champions League second qualifying round (Note: Dinamo Zagreb qualified for the Europa League third qualifying round by winning the 2015–16 Croatian Football Cup. However, since they already qualified for European competition based on their league position, the spot awarded to the cup winners was passed down the league.) |
| 2 | Rijeka | 36 | 21 | 14 | 1 | 56 | 20 | +36 | 77 | Qualification for the Europa League third qualifying round |
| 3 | Hajduk Split | 36 | 17 | 10 | 9 | 46 | 28 | +18 | 61 | Qualification for the Europa League second qualifying round |
| 4 | Lokomotiva | 36 | 16 | 4 | 16 | 56 | 53 | +3 | 52 | Qualification for the Europa League first qualifying round |
| 5 | Inter Zaprešić | 36 | 11 | 14 | 11 | 39 | 48 | −9 | 47 | |
| 6 | RNK Split | 36 | 10 | 16 | 10 | 28 | 29 | −1 | 46 | |
| 7 | Slaven Belupo | 36 | 10 | 12 | 14 | 41 | 42 | −1 | 42 | |
| 8 | Osijek | 36 | 7 | 13 | 16 | 27 | 49 | −22 | 34 | |
| 9 | Istra 1961 (O) | 36 | 4 | 12 | 20 | 23 | 58 | −35 | 24 | Qualification for the relegation play-off |
| 10 | NK Zagreb (R) | 36 | 3 | 8 | 25 | 27 | 64 | −37 | 17 | Relegation to Croatian Second Football League |

Source: PrvaHNL.hr, Soccerway
Rules for classification: 1) Points; 2) Head-to-head points; 3) Head-to-head goal difference; 4) Head-to-head goals scored (at home if two teams tied); 5) Goal difference; 6) Goals scored; 7) Play-off
(Note: Criteria 2–4 and 7 is only used if deciding Champion, teams to international competition or teams for relegation and in that case criteria 6 will not be used).
(C) Champions; (O) Play-off winners; (R) Relegated

== Results ==
| Home \ Away | DIN | HAJ | INT | IST | LOK | OSI | RIJ | SLA | SPL | ZAG | DIN | HAJ | INT | IST | LOK | OSI | RIJ | SLA | SPL | ZAG |
|---|---|---|---|---|---|---|---|---|---|---|---|---|---|---|---|---|---|---|---|---|
| Dinamo Zagreb | | 1–1 | 5–1 | 1–0 | 3–1 | 4–1 | 0–0 | 3–0 | 3–0 | 4–1 | | 2–1 | 1–0 | 1–0 | 3–2 | 3–0 | 3–0 | 2–1 | 1–0 | 1–0 |
| Hajduk Split | 0–0 | | 4–0 | 3–0 | 2–1 | 3–0 | 0–3 | 2–2 | 0–0 | 1–0 | 1–0 | | 0–2 | 3–0 | 2–0 | 2–2 | 1–2 | 2–0 | 0–0 | 1–0 |
| Inter Zaprešić | 2–2 | 0–2 | | 3–0 | 1–2 | 0–0 | 0–0 | 2–1 | 0–0 | 1–1 | 0–1 | 0–0 | | 3–0 | 3–1 | 4–2 | 0–0 | 2–1 | 1–1 | 2–2 |
| Istra 1961 | 1–1 | 4–1 | 0–0 | | 2–1 | 2–1 | 0–1 | 3–1 | 1–1 | 0–0 | 0–1 | 0–2 | 1–2 | | 0–3 | 0–0 | 0–1 | 0–2 | 0–0 | 1–4 |
| Lokomotiva | 0–4 | 1–2 | 1–2 | 6–1 | | 2–1 | 1–2 | 1–1 | 1–0 | 2–0 | 0–4 | 2–1 | 1–2 | 3–2 | | 2–0 | 0–1 | 2–0 | 1–1 | 2–0 |
| Osijek | 1–1 | 1–0 | 3–1 | 2–2 | 0–1 | | 1–1 | 0–0 | 0–1 | 0–0 | 0–1 | 2–1 | 1–0 | 0–0 | 1–3 | | 1–1 | 0–0 | 0–0 | 2–0 |
| Rijeka | 2–1 | 0–0 | 0–0 | 1–0 | 3–1 | 5–0 | | 3–3 | 2–1 | 4–1 | 0–0 | 1–0 | 4–0 | 2–0 | 2–0 | 2–1 | | 1–1 | 0–0 | 3–0 |
| Slaven Belupo | 1–2 | 0–1 | 4–0 | 0–0 | 2–2 | 3–0 | 0–0 | | 1–1 | 2–1 | 0–3 | 0–0 | 4–1 | 2–0 | 0–3 | 1–0 | 0–0 | | 0–1 | 3–0 |
| RNK Split | 1–0 | 0–2 | 1–1 | 3–0 | 2–1 | 2–1 | 0–2 | 2–0 | | 3–0 | 0–1 | 0–0 | 0–0 | 1–1 | 1–1 | 1–1 | 1–2 | 0–2 | | 1–0 |
| NK Zagreb | 0–2 | 0–2 | 2–3 | 1–1 | 1–2 | 0–1 | 3–3 | 2–0 | 1–2 | | 1–2 | 2–3 | 0–0 | 1–1 | 1–3 | 0–1 | 0–2 | 0–3 | 2–0 | |

Source: PrvaHNL.hr
Legend: Blue = home team win; Yellow = draw; Red = away team win.

== Relegation play-offs ==
At the end of the season, ninth placed Istra 1961 qualified for a two-legged relegation play-off tie against Šibenik, runners-up of the 2015–16 Croatian Second Football League.

=== First leg ===
29 May 2016
19:00

| Šibenik | 1–1 | Istra 1961 |
|---|---|---|
| Šare 87' | Report | Trojak 18' |

Stadion Šubićevac, Šibenik
Attendance: 3,000
Referee: Bruno Marić (Daruvar)

=== Second leg ===
1 June 2016
20:15

| Istra 1961 | 1–1 | Šibenik |
|---|---|---|
| Mišić 51' | | Šare 49' |
Penalties
| Zlomislić (penalty scored); Gržan (penalty scored); Mihaljević (penalty scored); Đurić (penalty missed); Victor (penalty scored); Bouhna (penalty scored) | 5–4 | (penalty scored) Plazonić; (penalty scored) Vukorepa; (penalty scored) Grković; (penalty missed) Alispahić; (penalty scored) Barać; (penalty missed) Collins |

Stadion Aldo Drosina, Pula
Attendance: 3,470
Referee: Fran Jović (Zagreb)

2–2 on aggregate. Istra 1961 won 5–4 on penalties.

== Statistics ==
=== Top scorers ===
As of 14 May 2016

| Rank | Player | Club | Goals | Apps | Minutes played |
|---|---|---|---|---|---|
| 1 | (North Macedonia) Ilija Nestorovski | Inter Zaprešić | 25 | 33 | 2968 |
| 2 | (North Macedonia) Muzafer Ejupi | Slaven Belupo | 16 | 32 | 2429 |
| 3 | (Slovenia) Roman Bezjak | Rijeka | 13 | 32 | 2625 |
| 3 | (Bosnia and Herzegovina) Armin Hodžić | Dinamo Zagreb | 13 | 24 | 1350 |
| 5 | (Croatia) Franko Andrijašević | Lokomotiva | 12 | 28 | 2354 |
| 5 | (Chile) Junior Fernandes | Dinamo Zagreb | 12 | 28 | 2119 |
| 5 | (Bosnia and Herzegovina) Tino-Sven Sušić | Hajduk Split | 12 | 27 | 2305 |
| 8 | (Croatia) Gabrijel Boban | NK Zagreb | 10 | 31 | 2699 |
| 9 | (Albania) Bekim Balaj | Rijeka | 9 | 31 | 1856 |
| 9 | (Albania) Eros Grezda | Lokomotiva | 9 | 29 | 2004 |

== Awards ==
=== Annual awards ===
| Award | Winner | Club |
|---|---|---|
| Player of the Season | (Croatia) Marko Pjaca | Dinamo Zagreb |
| Manager of the Season | (Croatia) Zoran Mamić | Dinamo Zagreb |
| Young Player of the Season | (Croatia) Ante Ćorić | Dinamo Zagreb |
| Goalkeeper of the Season | (Croatia) Lovre Kalinić | Hajduk Split |

Team of the Year
| Goalkeeper | (Croatia) Lovre Kalinić (Hajduk Split) | | | |
| Defence | (North Macedonia) Stefan Ristovski (Rijeka) | (Croatia) Gordon Schildenfeld (Dinamo Zagreb) | (Croatia) Marko Lešković (Rijeka) | (Croatia) Josip Pivarić (Dinamo Zagreb) |
| Midfield | (Croatia) Marko Pjaca (Dinamo Zagreb) | (Bosnia and Herzegovina) Tino-Sven Sušić (Hajduk Split) | (Croatia) Rog (Dinamo Zagreb) | (Croatia) Marin Tomasov (Rijeka) |
| Attack | (North Macedonia) Ilija Nestorovski (Inter Zaprešić) | | (Croatia) Ante Ćorić (Dinamo Zagreb) | |

== Attendances ==
| # | Club | Average |
|---|---|---|
| 1 | Hajduk | 9,266 |
| 2 | Rijeka | 4,018 |
| 3 | Dinamo Zagreb | 3,799 |
| 4 | Osijek | 1,520 |
| 5 | Istra | 1,423 |
| 6 | Slaven | 997 |
| 7 | Radnički | 989 |
| 8 | Lokomotiva | 949 |
| 9 | Zaprešić | 886 |
| 10 | Zagreb | 687 |

== See also ==
- 2015–16 Croatian Football Cup
- 2015–16 Croatian Second Football League
- 2015–16 Croatian Third Football League
