= Split city derby =

Splitski gradski derbi
- Other names: Derbi svetog Duje
- Location: Split, Croatia
- Teams: Hajduk and RNK
- First meeting: 16 March 1919 (unofficial)
- Latest meeting: Hajduk 5–2 Split (2016–17 Croatian League); 26 April 2017

Statistics
- Total meetings: 71 (27 league)
- Most wins: Hajduk (47)
- Top scorer: Leo Lemešić (16 goals)
- Largest victory: Hajduk 12–0 Split; 1926 Split Championship (14 Mar 1926)

Split city derby (Croatian: Splitski gradski derbi) or Derby of St. Duje (town's patron saint) is the name given to matches between Hajduk and RNK, two clubs from the Adriatic city of Split. The teams are supported by their fanbases called Hajduk's Torcida and Split's Crveni đavoli. Games are played on two nearby stadiums, Poljud and Park Mladeži.

== History ==
Derby between Hajduk and Split dates back to the days of Kingdom of Yugoslavia in the early 1920s after clubs were founded only one year apart. The first match between the two was an exhibition on 16 Mar 1919 between Hajduk and Anarh, ending in 11-0 Hajduk win. While today's RNK Split was in those times often dissolved, renamed or joined with other Split teams (over the years team was called Anarh, JNSK Jug, Split ŠK, Borac BŠK, HAŠK Split, Vicko Krstulović, Arsenal) Hajduk maintained its name and home ground, providing a field for their matches until Park mladeži was built in 1955. Teams regularly met during this period, playing friendly games and Split Championship. Between 1920 and 1941, clubs played 24 official and close to 50 friendly matches, with Hajduk winning almost all of them.

Following the end of World War II, both clubs were dissolved and joined anti-fascist movements. Split players were also active soldiers during the Spanish Civil War. After the war ended, both were reactivated, and continued their tradition which now spans to over 100 friendly games. First official league meeting came after Split qualified for their first league appearance in 1957–58 season. Split won a home game 2-0, but was eventually eliminated, only to return three years later for one more season. Their managers at time were one of Hajduk's greats Luka Kaliterna and Frane Matošić. Before Yugoslavia fell apart teams met in Yugoslav Cup couple of times, with Hajduk winning every game and achieving far memorable results.

Since Croatian independence, Hajduk joined Croatia’s top tier, while Split played lower divisions. Teams met in 1992–93 Croatian Cup in a surprising 3-0 Split win at Poljud, only to see Hajduk winning 2nd game 4-0 and go to the next round. For the next 18 years, only friendlies were occasionally played before Split earned their first elite division promotion for 2010–11 season. In the last few years, Hajduk went through financial and organisational changes, and with Split playing their best football in recent history, derbies became more leveled than ever before. Today, Split is going through a financial crisis while Hajduk became more stabilised but in the derbies, they are still equally matched.

== Results ==
The most recent derby was played on 31 July 2016 in Park Mladeži, in the 29th round of the 2016–17 Prva HNL season. It ended in a 1–0 Hajduk's win, with Franck Ohandza's only scorer.

Competition	Played	Hajduk wins	Draws	Split wins	Hajduk goals	Split goals
Split championship (1923–1936)
Split Championship	24	23	0	1	117	9
Totals	24	23	0	1	117	9
Yugoslav championship (1946–1991)
Yugoslav League	4	1	2	1	5	5
Yugoslav Cup	6	5	1	0	16	2
Yugoslavia totals	10	6	3	1	21	7
Other official games (1920–1992)
Domestic league qualifying	6	5	0	1	27	9
1940-41 Croatian League	2	1	1	0	10	1
Totals	8	6	1	1	37	10
Croatian championship (1992–present)
Prva HNL	23	11	10	2	30	15
Croatian Cup	6	2	1	3	8	8
Croatia totals	29	13	11	5	38	23
All Time	71	47	15	8	213	49

Last updated on 26 April 2017

=== Key ===
Match ended in a draw
Hajduk win
Split win

=== 1920–1941 ===
M	Date	Competition	Ground	Score	Hajduk scorers	RNK scorers
1	18 Apr 1920	Split Championship	Stari plac	0–1		?
2	3 Oct 1920	Split Championship	Stari plac	5–1	Gazdić (3), Radić, Tagliafero	?
3	13 Mar 1921	Split Championship	Stari plac	0–3	Radić, Tagliafero, Pilić	
4	20 Nov 1921	Split Championship	Stari plac	1–0	Borovčić-Kurir	
5	15 May 1922	Split Championship	Stari plac	0–5	M.Bonačić (3), Radić, Tagliafero	
6	22 Oct 1922	Split Championship	Stari plac	8–0	Hochmann (3), Rodin (2), Š.Poduje (2), Borovčić-Kurir	
7	31 May 1923	Split Championship	Stari plac	1–3	Rodin (2), Benčić	?
8	18 Nov 1923	Split Championship	Stari plac	6–1	Benčić (2), A.Bonačić (2), Borovčić-Kurir	?
9	30 Mar 1924	Split Championship	Stari plac	1–6	A.Bonačić (2), V.Poduje, Šore, Borovčić-Kurir, Benčić	?
10	1 Nov 1924	Split Championship	Stari plac	11–1	M.Bonačić (7), Radić (2), Borovčić-Kurir, Š.Poduje	?
11	1 Mar 1925	Split Championship	Stari plac	0–5	M.Bonačić (2), Machiedo, Borovčić-Kurir	
12	24 Jan 1926	Split Championship	Stari plac	0–1	Benčić	
13	14 Mar 1926	Split Championship	Stari plac	12–0	Lemešić (4), Benčić (3), Radić (3), Devivi, Š. Poduje	
14	3 Oct 1926	Split Championship	Stari plac	3–0		
15	20 Mar 1927	Split Championship	Stari plac	8–1	Benčić (4), M.Bonačić (3), Dumanić	?
16	27 Nov 1927	Split Championship	Stari plac	3–0		
17	21 Oct 1928	Split Championship	Stari plac	3–0		
18	8 May 1929	Split Championship	Stari plac	3–0	J.Bonačić (2), Radovniković-Težoro	
19	24 Nov 1929	Split Championship	Stari plac	4–1	Kragić, Mikačić, Lemešić	?
20	23 Feb 1930	Split Championship	Stari plac	7–0	Benčić (3), Lemešić (2), Kragić, Mikačić, A.Bakotić	
21	11 Nov 1930	Split Championship	Stari plac	6–0	A.Bakotić, Rodin, Š.Poduje, Kragić, Lemešić	
22	17 Apr 1932	Split Championship	Stari plac	0–7	Lemešić (3), Kragić (2), Ružić, Lin	
23	5 Aug 1934	Div 1 (qual)	Stari plac	1–2	Kragić	?
24	9 Sep 1934	Div 1 (qual)	Stari plac	5–1	Kragić (2), Lemešić (2), Dešković	?
25	12 Apr 1936	Split Championship	Stari plac	0–3	Kragić, F.Matošić, Radovniković-Težoro	
26	17 May 1936	Split Championship	Stari plac	3–1	F.Matošić, Jukić	?
27	8 Jan 1939	Cup (round of 16)	Stari plac	2–0	F.Matošić (2)	
28	15 Jan 1939	Cup (round of 16)	Stari plac	0–0		
29	8 Oct 1939	Div 1 (qual)	Stari plac	2–5	J.Matošić (3), Kacijan (2)	?
30	24 Mar 1940	Div 1 (qual)	Stari plac	8–3	Čapeta (4), Lemešić (3), Sobotka	?
31	15 Dec 1940	Banate of Croatia Championship	Stari plac	1–1	Kacijan	?
32	19 Mar 1941	Banate of Croatia Championship	Stari plac	9–0	F.Matošić (3), Batinić (2), Sobotka (2), Alujević, J.Matošić	

Note: Home team's score always shown first

=== 1945–1992 ===
M	Date	Competition	Ground	Score	Hajduk scorers	RNK scorers
33	10 Feb 1946	Croatian Championship (qual.)	Stari plac	0–2	Batinić, Viđak	
34	17 Feb 1946	Croatian Championship (qual.)	Stari plac	6–1	F.Matošić (2), V.Andrijašević (2), Lokošek, I.Radovniković	?
35	15 Dec 1957	Div 1	Stari plac	2–2	Krstulović, Žanetić	?
36	27 Apr 1958	Div 1	Park mladeži	2–0		Alujević (2)
37	20 Nov 1960	Div 1	Stari plac	1–1	Z.Bego	?
38	14 May 1961	Div 1	Park mladeži	0–2	Anković (2)	
39	20 Nov 1963	Cup (round of 32)	Stari plac	1–0	Anković	
40	2 Dec 1970	Cup (round of 32)	Stari plac	2–1	Nadoveza, Smolčić	?
41	23 Feb 1972	Cup (round of 32)	Stari plac	6–1	Šimek (2), Gluić (2), Hlevnjak, Jovanić	?
42	29 Aug 1973	Cup (round of 16)	Park mladeži	0–5	Mijač (3), Jurišić (2)	

Note: Home team's score always shown first

=== 1992– ===
M	Date	Competition	Ground	Score	Hajduk scorers	RNK scorers	Attendance	Report
43	23 Sep 1992	Cup (round of 32)	Poljud	0–3		Filipović, Perković, Škopljanac	500	HRnogomet.com
44	7 Oct 1992	Cup (round of 32)	Park mladeži	0–4	T.Erceg (2), S.Andrijašević, Jeličić		5,000	HRnogomet.com
45	29 Aug 2010	1. HNL	Park mladeži	1–1	Vukušić	Golubović	5,500	HRnogomet.com
46	12 Mar 2011	1. HNL	Poljud	3–1	Andrić (2), Vukušić	Vejić (o.g.)	8,000	HRnogomet.com
47	28 Aug 2011	1. HNL	Park mladeži	1–1	Tomasov	Obilinović	4,200	HRnogomet.com
48	10 Mar 2012	1. HNL	Poljud	0–0			12,000	HRnogomet.com
49	29 Jul 2012	1. HNL	Poljud	1–0	F.Andrijašević		12,000	HRnogomet.com
50	28 Oct 2012	1. HNL	Park mladeži	0–1	Vršajević		4,000	HRnogomet.com
51	31 Oct 2012	Cup (round of 16)	Poljud	2–1	Caktaš, Sušić	Rebić	4,000	HRnogomet.com
52	4 May 2013	1. HNL	Park mladeži	2–1	Kouassi	A.Erceg (2)	1,500	HRnogomet.com
53	28 Jul 2013	1. HNL	Park mladeži	0–3	Caktaš, Glumac (o.g.), Maglica		5,000	HRnogomet.com
54	5 Oct 2013	1. HNL	Poljud	0–0			7,000	HRnogomet.com
55	8 Feb 2014	1. HNL	Park mladeži	1–2	Pašalić (2)	Glavina	2,500	HRnogomet.com
56	13 Apr 2014	1. HNL	Poljud	1–0	Pašalić		6,000	HRnogomet.com
57	20 Sep 2014	1. HNL	Park mladeži	1–1	Maglica	Galović	3,000	HRnogomet.com
58	7 Dec 2014	1. HNL	Poljud	2–1	Ibriks (o.g.), Milić	Jukić	8,000	HRnogomet.com
59	4 Apr 2015	1. HNL	Poljud	1–2	Milevskyi	Rog, Cikalleshi	6,000	HRnogomet.com
60	8 Apr 2015	Cup (SF)	Poljud	1–1	Sušić	A.Erceg	6,000	HRnogomet.com
61	22 Apr 2015	Cup (SF)	Park mladeži	1–0		Cikalleshi	3,500	HRnogomet.com
62	29 May 2015	1. HNL	Park mladeži	1–1	Maloku	Vidović	2,500	HRnogomet.com
63	19 Jul 2015	1. HNL	Poljud	0–0			10,594	HRnogomet.com
64	27 Sep 2015	1. HNL	Park mladeži	0–2	Vlašić, Caktaš		3,000	HRnogomet.com
65	12 Dec 2015	1. HNL	Poljud	0–0			7,000	HRnogomet.com
66	3 Apr 2016	1. HNL	Park mladeži	0–0			3,500	HRnogomet.com
67	31 Jul 2016	1. HNL	Park mladeži	0–1	Ohandza		3,000	HRnogomet.com
68	16 Oct 2016	1. HNL	Poljud	2–1	Futács, Bašić	Pešić	7,276	HRnogomet.com
69	30 Nov 2016	Cup (QF)	Park mladeži	2–1 (aet)	Barry	Ugrina, Pešić	2,435	HRnogomet.com
70	19 Feb 2017	1. HNL	Park mladeži	1–1	A.Erceg	Pešić	3,068	HRnogomet.com
71	26 Apr 2017	1. HNL	Poljud	5–2	Vlašić, Nižić, A.Erceg, Said, Ohandza	Tomičić, Ugrina	5,450	HRnogomet.com

Note: Home team's score always shown first

== Player and manager records ==
=== Top scorers 1919–1992 ===
16 goals

- (Kingdom of Yugoslavia) Leo Lemešić (Hajduk)

15 goals

- (Kingdom of Yugoslavia) Ljubomir Benčić (Hajduk)
- (Kingdom of Yugoslavia) Mirko Bonačić (Hajduk)

9 goals

- (Kingdom of Yugoslavia) Vladimir Kragić (Hajduk)
- (Kingdom of Yugoslavia) (Socialist Federal Republic of Yugoslavia) Frane Matošić (Hajduk)

8 goals

- (Kingdom of Yugoslavia) Vinko Radić (Hajduk)

5 goals

- (Kingdom of Yugoslavia) Šime Poduje (Hajduk)
- (Kingdom of Yugoslavia) Janko Rodin (Hajduk)

=== Top scorers 1992– ===
Updated up to the last derby played on 26 April 2017

5 goals

- (Croatia) Ante Erceg (Split, Hajduk)

3 goals

- (Croatia) Mijo Caktaš (Hajduk)
- (Croatia) Mario Pašalić (Hajduk)
- (Croatia) Ivan Pešić (Split)

2 goals

- (Croatia) Srđan Andrić (Hajduk)
- (Albania) Sokol Cikalleshi (Split)
- (Croatia) Tomislav Erceg (Hajduk)
- (Croatia) Anton Maglica (Hajduk)
- (Cameroon) Franck Ohandza (Hajduk)
- (Bosnia and Herzegovina) Tino-Sven Sušić (Hajduk)
- (Croatia) Sandro Ugrina (Split)
- (Croatia) Nikola Vlašić (Hajduk)
- (Croatia) Ante Vukušić (Hajduk)

=== Players who have scored in Split city derby for both clubs ===
- (Croatia) Ante Erceg

=== Players who have played for both clubs (senior career) ===
- (Croatia) Mate Bilić
- (Croatia) Duje Čop
- (Croatia) Zvonimir Deranja
- (Croatia) Ante Erceg
- (Croatia) Dalibor Filipović
- (Croatia) Tomislav Glumac
- (Croatia) Juraj Grizelj
- (Bosnia and Herzegovina) Mirko Hrgović
- (Croatia) Janko Janković
- (Croatia) Frane Lojić
- (Croatia) Filip Marčić
- (Ukraine) Artem Milevskyi
- (Croatia) Goran Milović
- (Croatia) Srđan Mladinić
- (Croatia) Jure Obšivač
- (Croatia) Mirko Oremuš
- (Croatia) Ivan Pešić
- (Croatia) Ivica Pirić
- (Croatia) Nenad Pralija
- (Bosnia and Herzegovina) Ivan Radeljić
- (Bosnia and Herzegovina) Predrag Šimić
- (Croatia) Ivan Tomičić
- (Bosnia and Herzegovina) Ivan Anton Vasilj
- (Croatia) Josip Vuković

=== Managers who have worked at both clubs ===
- (Socialist Federal Republic of Yugoslavia) Lenko Grčić
- (Croatia) Ivan Katalinić
- (Socialist Federal Republic of Yugoslavia) Frane Matošić
- (Socialist Federal Republic of Yugoslavia) Jozo Matošić
- (Socialist Federal Republic of Yugoslavia) Ozren Nedoklan
- (Croatia) Stanko Poklepović
- (Socialist Federal Republic of Yugoslavia) Ivo Radovniković
- (Croatia) Zoran Vulić

== Head-to-head league results ==
	57-58	60-61	10–11	11–12	12–13	13–14	14–15	15–16	16–17
No. of teams	14	12	16	16	12	10	10	10	10
Hajduk	3	9	2	2	4	3	3	3	3
RNK	11	11	3	4	5	4	7	6	10

The table lists the place each team took in each of the seasons.

== See also ==
- Eternal derby
- Adriatic derby
- Dalmatian derby (Hajduk Split vs Šibenik)
- Dinamo–Rijeka derby
