= Zdravko Mamić =

Croatian and Bosnian football administrator and sports agent (born 1959)

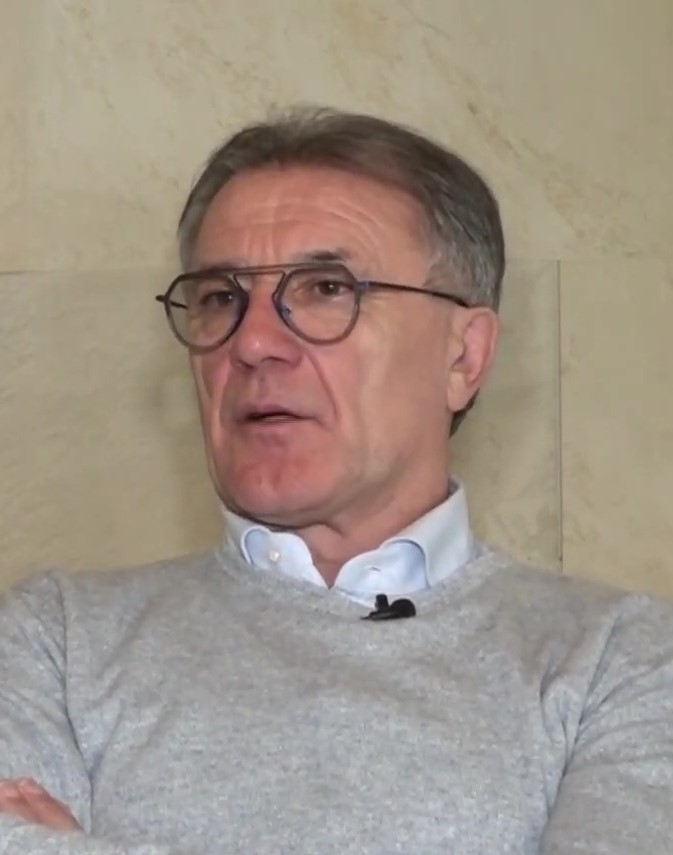
- Mamić in 2021
- Born: 16 July 1959 (age 66); Bjelovar, PR Croatia, FPR Yugoslavia
- Citizenship: Bosnia and Herzegovina; Croatia
- Occupations: Football administrator, sports agent
- Years active: 2003–present
- Known for: Former executive director of GNK Dinamo Zagreb

Zdravko Mamić (born 16 July 1959) is a Croatian and Bosnian former football administrator and sports agent. From 2003 to 2016, he was the executive director of Croatian football club GNK Dinamo Zagreb.

Mamić also worked as an advisor at NK Lokomotiva and later, between 2016 and 2021, at Dinamo Zagreb. In 2018, he was found guilty of tax fraud in Croatia at which point, in order to avoid going to prison, he fled to neighbouring Bosnia and Herzegovina where he's been living as a fugitive from justice ever since.

== Early life ==
Mamić was born in Bjelovar, PR Croatia, FPR Yugoslavia on 16 July 1959 to Herzegovinian Croat parents Josip (1929–2003) and Lucija Mamić, originally from the Herzegovina villages of Zidine and Bukova Gora, respectively, who had moved, in 1956, to the PR Croatia federal unit within FPR Yugoslavia in search of expanded employment opportunities. Mamić has two siblings, both of whom would go on to become professional footballers: older brother Stojko (born 1957) and younger brother Zoran (1971).

In the 1970s, with his two brothers (older Stojan and younger Zoran), teenage Zdravko moved from Bjelovar to the Zagreb suburb of Sesvete while their father was off working in West Germany as part of the gastarbeiter programme.

== Football executive career ==
Mamić's first direct contact with GNK Dinamo Zagreb was through the Bad Blue Boys, Dinamo's ultras supporters group.

In the 1980s, Mamić befriended the then-manager of Dinamo, Miroslav Blažević, and made his way into Dinamo. In February 2016, he resigned as executive director, but returned as an advisor. On 16 March 2021, he resigned from all positions at the club.

=== Trial ===
In 2009, Mamić was sued by Eduardo da Silva for unfavorable contract according to which had to pay 50% of salary for the entirety of the career to Mamić's family. Silva won the case in 2014.

On 18 November 2015, Mamić along with five other people was arrested over transfer irregularities in Dinamo Zagreb. He was suspected of tax evasion and bribery.

On 6 June 2018, Mamić was sentenced on first instance to six and a half years prison for transfer fraud relating to Luka Modrić and Dejan Lovren's transfer to Tottenham Hotspur and Olympique Lyonnais respectively. Mamić, his brother Zoran, former Dinamo director Damir Vrbanović and tax official Milan Pernar, were all found guilty of siphoning over €15 million from Dinamo and defrauding the state budget over €1.2 million in unpaid taxes. Mamić, who had crossed the border into Bosnia and Herzegovina one day earlier, did not attend the sentencing and stated that he would not return to Croatia.

The Court of Bosnia and Herzegovina refused to extradite Mamić since he also holds Bosnian citizenship. The Supreme Court of Croatia confirmed Mamić's sentence on 15 March 2021.

== Controversy ==
Mamić has become well known for his hostile behaviour towards journalists, including a number of public incidents punctuated by threats of violence and profanities of personal and professional nature.

In December 2011, a small group of Bad Blue Boys entered a press conference, confronting Mamić with his 'mismanagement of Dinamo Zagreb'. While in function as the chairman of Dinamo, Mamić has been detained by police. During his thirteen year reign at Dinamo Zagreb from 2003 to 2016, he appointed 15 different managers. On 15 March 2013, he was arrested after a verbal attack on Croatian Minister of Sports, Science and Education Željko Jovanović on a radio show.

During the Croatian War of Independence, Mamić participated in the privatisation of Česma Wood Industry from Bjelovar. In 2000 it was determined that the suspicious operations in the company caused 14 million HRK damage to the State budget, while the number of workers was halved.

== Personal life ==
=== Assassination attempt ===
On 22 August 2017, Mamić sustained a leg wound in an assassination attempt via ambush by two masked perpetrators who opened fire while he was exiting his vehicle during his annual visit to the village of Zidine near Tomislavgrad in Bosnia and Herzegovina, on the anniversary of his father Josip's death.
