= Zoran Mamić =

Croatian football manager (born 1971)

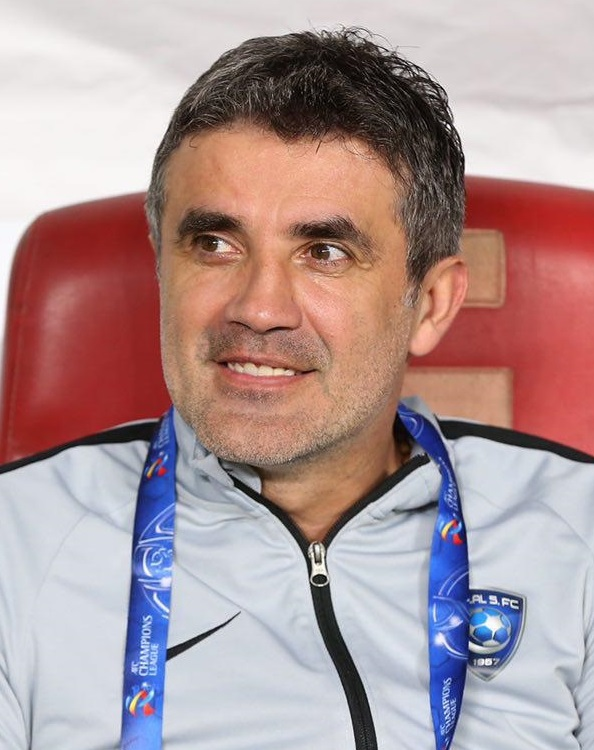
- Mamić coaching Al Hilal in 2019

Personal information
- Full name: Zoran Mamić
- Date of birth: 30 September 1971 (age 55)
- Place of birth: Zagreb, SR Croatia, Yugoslavia
- Height: 1.90 m (6 ft 3 in)
- Positions: Defensive midfielder; centre-back

Team information
- Current team: Sarajevo (adviser)

Youth career
- Dinamo Zagreb

Senior career*
Years	Team	Apps	(Gls)
1989–1996	Dinamo Zagreb	124	(15)
1991	→ GOŠK-Jug (loan)	3	(0)
1996–1998	VfL Bochum	45	(4)
1998–2000	Bayer Leverkusen	15	(0)
2000–2001	VfL Bochum	22	(0)
2001–2003	Greuther Fürth	48	(1)
2003–2004	LR Ahlen	21	(0)
2004–2005	Eintracht Trier	30	(1)
2005–2007	Dinamo Zagreb	47	(3)
Total		397	(24)

International career
1996–1998	Croatia	6	(0)

Managerial career
- 2013: Dinamo Zagreb (caretaker)
- 2013–2016: Dinamo Zagreb
- 2016–2017: Al Nassr
- 2017–2019: Al Ain
- 2019–2020: Al Hilal
- 2020–2021: Dinamo Zagreb
Medal record
Men's football
Representing Croatia
Bronze medal – third place	FIFA World Cup	1998
- * Club domestic league appearances and goals

Zoran Mamić (pronounced [zǒran mǎːmitɕ]; born 30 September 1971) is a Croatian former professional football manager and player. He is best known for his successful time as a player and later manager of Dinamo Zagreb. He is currently an adviser for Bosnian Premier League club Sarajevo.

Mamić represented the Croatia national team 6 times. He was part of the 1998 World Cup team when Croatia finished third.

Mamić was previously manager of Dinamo Zagreb, Al Ain from the UAE and Saudi sides Al Nassr and Al Hilal. In his first season with Al Ain, he won the first double in the club's 50-year history, which includes the UAE Pro League and UAE President's Cup. He also worked as the director of football at Dinamo Zagreb.

== Club career ==
Mamić played for Dinamo Zagreb between 1989 and 1996, after which he went on to spend nine years playing for various clubs in Germany. Between 1996 and 1998, he made 45 Bundesliga appearances and scored four league goals for Bochum. In 1998 he moved for two seasons to Bayer Leverkusen, but only made 15 Bundesliga appearances for the club without scoring a goal. He then returned to Bochum for the 2000–01 season and made another 23 Bundesliga appearances for the club.

In 2001 he moved to 2. Bundesliga side Greuther Fürth and spent two seasons with the club, making 48 appearances and scoring one goal in the 2. Bundesliga. He subsequently played one season apiece for 2. Bundesliga clubs LR Ahlen and Eintracht Trier, making 21 league appearances for Ahlen and 30 league appearances for Trier, scoring one goal for the latter club. In his career in Germany, Mamić made 83 Bundesliga appearances with four goals scored as well as 99 2. Bundesliga appearances with two goals scored.

In 2005 he returned to Dinamo Zagreb and finished his playing career at the club in late March 2007, after which he continued to work for the club as their sporting director. He captained the Dinamo Zagreb team that won the Croatian League championship in 2006. His last match for Dinamo Zagreb was on 3 March 2007 in their 3–1 away win over Varteks.

== International career ==
Mamić made his debut for Croatia in an October 1996 World Cup qualification match against Bosnia and Herzegovina in Bologna, coming on as a 90th-minute substitute for Slaven Bilić, and earned a total of 6 caps, scoring no goals. He was a member of the country's bronze medal-winning squad at the 1998 FIFA World Cup, although he did not play a single minute during the team's seven matches. His final international was a June 1998 friendly match against Australia.

== Managerial career ==
=== Dinamo Zagreb ===
On 22 October 2013, following the sacking of Branko Ivanković, Mamić was named caretaker manager of Dinamo Zagreb by his brother and the club chairman Zdravko Mamić. This was the second time in only two months that he was appointed as interim coach, as he (together with Damir Krznar) had taken over the team from Dinamo's previous coach Krunoslav Jurčić after their 2–0 home defeat against Austria Wien in the Champions League play-off in August 2013. He ended his first match as interim coach with an away win against Slaven Belupo. A week later, Dinamo faced Austria Wien in the second leg of the Champions League play-offs. In Vienna, Mamić and Krznar led Dinamo to a 3–2 win, failing to clinch a spot in the Champions League group stage in the last 10 minutes of the match, as Dinamo had a 3–1 lead. After sacking of coach Ivanković, Mamić was again appointed as interim coach. He chose former Dinamo Zagreb players, Damir Krznar and Igor Cvitanović, to be his assistants. In November 2013, after string of positive results, including an 0–0 match against PSV Eindhoven in the Europa League, Mamić suffered his first defeat as Dinamo Zagreb coach, in away match against PSV Eindhoven. In December 2013, Mamić led Dinamo to one of their biggest Eternal Derby triumphs against Hajduk Split, when they won 5–0 in the Croatian Cup quarter-finals. Mamić was led Dinamo to another Champions League season in 2015–16, after a total 6–2 aggregate win against KF Skënderbeu Korçë in the play-off round. In the group stage, Dimano started with a shocking 2–1 home win over Arsenal. With Arsenal further losing to Olympiacos, Dinamo Zagreb was favored to at least manage third place in the group, and secure Europa League Round of 32. However, Dinamo lost the remainder of their matches and were eliminated as last in the group. Mamić still hailed the campaign as the most memorable, due to the historic win against Arsenal.

=== Al Nassr ===
In the summer 2016, Mamić accepted an offer from Al Nassr from Saudi Arabia, ending his abysmal years in Dinamo. Mamić started the season well and after several rounds, it was speculated that he would lead Al Nassr to their first trophy after many years of hurt. In the semi-finals of the Saudi Crown Prince Cup. Al Nassr completely dominated highly favoured rivals Al Hilal and defeated them 2–0 to qualify for the final, which they lost.

In February 2017, after financial problems at the club and despite being offered a new contract, Mamić resigned and left for the United Arab Emirates to join Al Ain days later.

=== Al Ain ===
Mamić signed an 18 months contract but came to the bench when the club has already lost every chance of winning a trophy this season. Only competition that the new coach started from beginning was the 2017 AFC Champions League. Al Ain won the group and qualified for the next round undefeated where the next opponent was Iranian Esteghlal. In the first leg in Iran, in front of 80,000 fans home team got a late winner but week after Al Ain defeated their opponents 6–1 to qualify for the quarter-final. In the quarter-final stage, after the summer break, the opponent was the toughest possible - Al-Hilal. First game in Al Ain ended without goals but set pieces mistakes in the return game were expensive and Al Ain was eliminated.

Al Ain dominated the UAE Pro-League from start until the end and eventually clinched a title with 7 points advantage ahead of Al Wahda. Wins like 7–0, 6–2, 6–0, 5–0 and 4–0 became a regular thing and in the end Al Ain won the title with more than 3 goals per game percentage and the most scored goals in the history of the competition. It was the first trophy for Al Ain after three seasons and only a couple of days later, on 3 May, Mamić added a UAE President's Cup trophy too. By that he earned his place in the history books of the club because it was the first double in the club's history. At the end of the season it was announced that Mamić agreed to an extension of the contract with Al Ain until June 2019.

=== Al-Hilal ===
On 31 January 2019, Mamić was named the head coach of Al-Hilal. He was sacked on 27 April 2019, following a 5–0 home defeat to Al-Taawoun.

=== Return to Dinamo Zagreb ===
On 5 June 2019, Mamić returned to Dinamo Zagreb, being appointed as the sporting director.

On 7 July 2020, following the dismissal of Igor Jovićević, he was named the interim manager of Dinamo Zagreb until the end of the season. In his first game on 12 July, Mamić led the team to a 2–3 home defeat to fierce rivals Hajduk Split. He was intended to be a caretaker just for three league matches, however he was appointed as full manager after false information about Matjaž Kek refusing to coach Dinamo.

On 15 March 2021, following the verdict by which he was sentenced to four years in prison, Mamić resigned as manager and director of football at Dinamo.

== Personal life ==
Mamić was born in Zagreb as the third child of Josip and Lucija Mamić. Both of his parents hail from Bosnia and Herzegovina; the father, Josip, is from Zidine, and the mother, Lucija, is from Bukova Gora.

=== Tax evasion allegations ===
Zoran is a younger brother of Zdravko, former executive director of GNK Dinamo Zagreb. Both brothers have been found guilty of siphoning millions of Euros from Dinamo Zagreb and evading millions in unpaid taxes, but while Zoran has been sentenced, his brother is currently evading arrest warrants by residing in a non-extradition country. Their assets in Croatia are confiscated. In May 2021, he was arrested in Bosnia and Herzegovina, having fled there along with his brother Zdravko following his conviction. Croatia had issued an international arrest warrant for him, after failing to report to prison to begin serving his sentences for tax evasion.

Mamić married Ana Šikić in 2014, and divorced her in 2016 after committing adultery. From his first marriage with Vanja Horvat, a daughter of the famous handballer, Hrvoje Horvat, he has two children: a daughter, Nina, and son, Bruno.

== Managerial statistics ==
As of match played 14 March 2021

Club	From	To	Record								
Club	From	To	P	W	D	L	GF	GA	GD	Win %	Ref.
Dinamo Zagreb (caretaker)	22 August 2013	22 September 2013	3	3	0	0	9	4	+5	100.00	
Dinamo Zagreb	22 October 2013	20 June 2016	144	97	26	21	306	118	+188	67.36	
Al-Nassr	21 June 2016	28 January 2017	21	15	2	4	41	14	+27	71.43	
Al Ain	1 February 2017	30 January 2019	89	51	19	19	210	120	+90	57.30	
Al-Hilal	4 February 2019	26 April 2019	21	13	3	5	36	24	+12	61.90	
Dinamo Zagreb	7 July 2020	15 March 2021	42	29	7	6	96	36	+60	69.05	
Total			320	208	57	55	698	316	+382	65.00	—

== Honours ==
=== Player ===
==== Club ====
Dinamo Zagreb

- Croatian First League: 1992–93, 1995–96, 2005–06, 2006–07
- Croatian Cup: 1993–94, 1995–96, 2006–07
- Croatian Super Cup: 2006

Bayer Leverkusen

- Bundesliga runner-up: 1999–2000

==== International ====
Croatia

- FIFA World Cup third-place: 1998

=== Manager ===
Dinamo Zagreb

- Croatian First League: 2013–14, 2014–15, 2015–16, 2019–20
- Croatian Cup: 2014–15, 2015–16

Al Ain

- UAE Pro League: 2017–18
- UAE President's Cup: 2017–18
- FIFA Club World Cup runner-up: 2018

== Orders ==
- Order of the Croatian Interlace – 1998
