= Šušak =

Šušak (pronounced [ʃûʃak]) is a Croatian surname and may refer to:

- Gojko Šušak (1945–1998), Croatian politician
- Ivo Šušak (born 1948), Croatian football manager
- Milan Šušak (born 1984), Australian footballer of Serbian descent
