= Dalmatian derby =

This is a list of a football derbies of the most popular clubs in Dalmatia who play each other:

- Dalmatian derby (Hajduk Split vs Šibenik)
- Dalmatian derby (Hajduk Split vs Zadar)
- Dalmatian derby (Šibenik vs Zadar)
- Dalmatian derby (Šibenik vs Zadar, basketball)
- Dalmatian derby (Split vs Zadar, basketball)
- Split city derby (Derby of St. Duje), between Hajduk and RNK Split
