= 2014–15 Croatian Second Football League =

Croatian Second Football League
- Season: 2014–15
- Champions: Inter Zaprešić
- Promoted: Inter Zaprešić
- Relegated: Bistra
- Matches: 165
- Goals: 380 (2.3 per match)
- Top goalscorer: Ilija Nestorovski (24)
- Biggest home win: Sesvete 5–0 Inter Zaprešić; Gorica 5–0 H. Dragovoljac
- Biggest away win: Imotski 0–4 Gorica
- Highest scoring: Segesta 4–3 Sesvete

The 2014–15 Croatian Second Football League (also known as Druga HNL or 2. HNL) is the 24th season of Croatia's second level football competition since its establishment in 1992.

NK Zagreb were league champions and earned a place in Croatia's first division, Croatian First Football League. Pomorac withdrew from the competition due to financial instability.

== Format ==
The league is contested by 12 teams. Only two teams from Croatian Third Football League were granted license for competing in the second level - Bistra and Imotski.

Hrvatski Dragovoljac were relegated from 2013–14 Croatian First Football League.

== Changes from last season ==
The following clubs have been promoted or relegated at the end of the 2013–14 season:

=== From 2. HNL ===
Promoted to 1. HNL

- Zagreb

Relegated to 3. HNL

- Solin (11th place)
- Zelina (12th place)

=== To 2. HNL ===
Relegated from 1. HNL

- Hrvatski Dragovoljac (12th place)

Promoted from 3. HNL

- Bistra (3. HNL Center)
- Imotski (3. HNL South)

== Clubs ==
Locations of teams in 2014–15 Druga HNL

Club	City / Town	Stadium	2013-14 result	Capacity
Bistra	Donja Bistra	SRC Bistra	3rd in 3. HNL Center	1,000
Cibalia	Vinkovci	Stadion HNK Cibalia	2nd in 2. HNL	10,000
Dugopolje	Dugopolje	Stadion Hrvatski vitezovi	10th in 2. HNL	5,200
Gorica	Velika Gorica	Stadion Radnika	7th in 2. HNL	8,000
Hrvatski Dragovoljac	Zagreb	Stadion NŠC Stjepan Spajić	12th in 1. HNL	5,000
Imotski	Imotski	Stadion Gospin dolac	1st in 3. HNL South	4,000
Inter Zaprešić	Zaprešić	Stadion ŠRC Zaprešić	3rd in 2. HNL	5,228
Lučko	Zagreb	Stadion Lučko	9th in 2. HNL	1,500
Pomorac	Kostrena	Stadion Žuknica	7th in 2. HNL	3,000
Rudeš	Zagreb	ŠC Rudeš	4th in 2. HNL	1,000
Segesta	Sisak	Gradski stadion Sisak	6th in 2. HNL	8,000
Sesvete	Zagreb	Sv. Josip Radnik	5th in 2. HNL	1,200

=== Managerial changes ===
Team	Outgoing manager	Manner of departure	Date of vacancy	Replaced by	Date of appointment	Position in table
Cibalia	(Croatia) Stanko Mršić	Contract expired	31 May 2014	(Croatia) Zoran Tomić	25 June 2014	Pre-season
Segesta	(Croatia) Valentin Barišić	Contract expired	31 May 2014	(Croatia) Vjeran Simunić	2 July 2014	Pre-season
Dugopolje	(Croatia) Stipe Balajić	Resigned	11 September 2014	(Croatia) Mario Smodlaka	11 September 2014	2nd
Segesta	(Croatia) Vjeran Simunić	Resigned	11 September 2014	(Croatia) Mile Buinac	11 September 2014	8th
Cibalia	(Croatia) Zoran Tomić	Resigned	15 October 2014	(Croatia) Siniša Sesar	20 October 2014	4th
Bistra	(Slovenia) Iztok Kapušin	Sacked	28 October 2014	(Croatia) Bernard Gulić	28 October 2014	8th
Gorica	(Croatia) Ilija Lončarević	Mutual consent	29 November 2014	(Croatia) Dražen Biškup	3 December 2014	1st
Cibalia	(Croatia) Siniša Sesar	Resigned	29 March 2015	(Croatia) Branko Buhač (caretaker)		4th

== League table ==
Pos	Team	Pld	W	D	L	GF	GA	GD	Pts	Qualification or relegation
1	Inter Zaprešić (C, P)	30	17	7	6	48	25	+23	58	Promotion to Croatian First Football League
2	Sesvete	30	15	8	7	53	30	+23	53	Qualification to promotion play-off
3	Gorica	30	13	12	5	46	26	+20	51	
4	Rudeš	30	10	12	8	36	28	+8	42	
5	Imotski	30	9	11	10	31	38	−7	38	
6	Cibalia	30	10	8	12	36	44	−8	38	
7	Dugopolje	30	7	13	10	27	32	−5	34	
8	Segesta	30	9	7	14	31	42	−11	34	
9	Lučko	30	8	9	13	24	35	−11	33	
10	Hrvatski Dragovoljac	30	8	9	13	30	42	−12	33	Relegation to Croatian Third Football League (Note: Hrvatski Dragovoljac were kept in the division despite getting relegated.)
11	Bistra (R)	30	5	12	13	18	38	−20	27	Relegation to Croatian Third Football League
12	Pomorac (D, R)	0	0	0	0	0	0	0	0	Withdraw from the league

Source: Druga-HNL.com, Sportnet.hr (in Croatian)
Rules for classification: 1st points; 2nd goal difference; 3rd goals scored
For deciding champion, promotion and relegation: 1st points; 2nd head-to-head points; 3rd head-to-head goal difference; 4th head-to-head away goals scored.
(C) Champions; (D) Disqualified; (P) Promoted; (R) Relegated

== Results ==
=== Matches 1–22 ===
Home \ Away	BIS	CIB	DUG	GOR	HRD	IMO	INT	LUČ	RUD	SEG	SES
Bistra		1–1	1–1	0–2	1–0	1–1	1–1	2–1	0–1	2–0	0–2
Cibalia	2–1		2–0	0–1	1–1	2–3	0–3	1–0	1–1	3–0	1–0
Dugopolje	3–0	0–1		0–3	3–2	3–1	1–1	1–1	1–1	0–0	1–1
Gorica	2–0	1–2	0–0		5–0	1–2	1–0	1–1	2–2	3–2	1–1
Hrvatski Dragovoljac	1–1	2–2	0–1	0–1		0–2	2–1	2–0	3–2	2–1	1–1
Imotski	0–0	1–0	0–2	0–4	2–2		1–4	3–1	0–0	1–0	0–1
Inter Zaprešić	3–0	1–0	0–2	1–1	1–0	0–0		3–0	2–1	2–0	4–1
Lučko	1–0	1–1	2–1	2–2	0–2	1–2	0–1		1–0	0–2	0–0
Rudeš	0–0	3–0	2–0	0–0	2–0	3–1	1–2	1–4		3–0	1–2
Segesta	4–0	2–1	2–1	0–2	0–2	1–0	1–1	2–0	0–0		4–3
Sesvete	1–2	1–2	1–0	1–1	5–1	2–0	5–0	2–0	3–0	2–1	

Source: Druga-HNL.com, Hrsport.net
Legend: Blue = home team win; Yellow = draw; Red = away team win.

=== Matches 23–33 ===
Home \ Away	BIS	CIB	DUG	GOR	HRD	IMO	INT	LUČ	RUD	SEG	SES
Bistra				0–2	0–0	1–1					1–1
Cibalia	1–2		2–2			2–2	2–1			2–4	
Dugopolje	0–0				0–0			0–0		1–0	
Gorica		3–1	1–1		3–2		0–1	0–2	0–0		
Hrvatski Dragovoljac		2–1					1–2	0–0	1–2	1–0	
Imotski			3–1	1–1	0–0			2–0	0–0		1–1
Inter Zaprešić	3–0		1–1			3–1				2–0	3–0
Lučko	1–0	0–1					1–0		1–1	1–1	
Rudeš	1–0	1–1	1–0				1–1			4–0	
Segesta	1–1			1–1		1–0					1–1
Sesvete		4–0	3–0	3–1	2–0			1–2	2–1		

Source: Druga-HNL.com, Hrsport.net
Legend: Blue = home team win; Yellow = draw; Red = away team win.

== Top goalscorers ==
The top scorers in the 2014–15 Croatian Second Football League season were:

Rank	Name	Club	Goals	Apps	Minutes played
1	(North Macedonia) Ilija Nestorovski	Inter Zaprešić	24	27	2423
2	(Croatia) Jakov Puljić	Cibalia	16	26	2320
3	(Cameroon) Franck Ohandza	Sesvete	15	22	1785
4	(Croatia) Tomislav Kiš (Note: Doesn't include a goal Kiš scored in a 3–0 victory over Pomorac on 7 September 2014)	Gorica	11	16	1327
5	(Bosnia and Herzegovina) Josip Ćorić (Note: Doesn't include a goal Ćorić scored in a 1–0 victory over Pomorac on 24 August 2014)	Sesvete	9	27	2296
6	(Croatia) Miro Slavica	Imotski, Lučko	8	23	1852
6	(Croatia) Matija Dvorneković (Note: Doesn't include two goals Dvorneković scored in a 3–0 victory over Pomorac on 7 September 2014)	Gorica	8	24	2123
6	(Croatia) Matej Dumbović	Segesta	8	29	2189
9	(Croatia) Ante Vitaić	Dugopolje	7	22	1905
9	(Croatia) Nikola Rak	Gorica	7	26	2051

== See also ==
- 2014–15 Croatian First Football League
- 2014–15 Croatian Football Cup
