= 2013–14 Croatian First Football League =

MAXtv Prva Liga
- Season: 2013–14
- Champions: Dinamo Zagreb
- Relegated: Hrvatski Dragovoljac
- Champions League: Dinamo Zagreb
- Europa League: Rijeka; Hajduk Split; Split
- Matches: 180
- Goals: 514 (2.86 per match)
- Top goalscorer: Duje Čop (22)
- Biggest home win: Dinamo 6–0 Istra 1961
- Biggest away win: S. Belupo 1–6 Dinamo
- Highest scoring: S. Belupo 1–6 Dinamo; Zadar 3–4 Lokomotiva
- Longest winning run: Rijeka (6)
- Longest unbeaten run: Hajduk Split (18)
- Longest winless run: Slaven Belupo (16)
- Longest losing run: Slaven Belupo, Zadar (8)
- Highest attendance: 30,000 (Hajduk 2–0 Dinamo)
- Average attendance: 3,202

The 2013–14 Croatian First Football League (also known as 1. HNL; officially styled as MAXtv Prva Liga for sponsorship reasons) was the 23rd season of the Croatian First Football League, the national championship for men's association football teams in Croatia, since its establishment in 1992. The season began on 13 July 2013 and ended on 17 May 2014.

The league was contested by 10 teams, down from 12 in the previous season. Dinamo Zagreb were the defending champions, having won their eighth consecutive title in 2012–13.

== Teams ==
The following is a complete list of teams who contested the 2013–14 Prva HNL.

Locations of teams in 2013–14 Prva HNL

=== Stadia and locations ===
Stadium	City	Home club	Licensed club(s)	Capacity
Maksimir	Zagreb	Dinamo Zagreb	Lokomotiva	37,168
Poljud	Split	Hajduk Split		34,448
Gradski vrt	Osijek	Osijek		19,220
Kantrida	Rijeka	Rijeka		10,155
Aldo Drosina	Pula	Istra 1961		8,923
Park mladeži	Split	RNK Split		8,000
Stanovi	Zadar	Zadar		5,860
NŠC Stjepan Spajić	Zagreb	Hrvatski Dragovoljac		4,500
Gradski stadion	Koprivnica	Slaven Belupo		3,134

=== Personnel and kits ===
Team	Manager	Captain	Kit manufacturer	Shirt sponsor
Dinamo Zagreb	(Croatia) Zoran Mamić	(Croatia) Josip Šimunić	Puma	—
Hajduk Split	(Croatia) Igor Tudor	(Croatia) Mario Maloča	Macron	Tommy
Hrvatski Dragovoljac	(Croatia) Davor Mladina	(Croatia) Ivan Čović	Alpas	—
Istra 1961	(Croatia) Igor Pamić	(Croatia) Fausto Budicin	Errea	—
Lokomotiva	(Croatia) Tomislav Ivković	(Croatia) Leonard Mesarić	Nike	—
Osijek	(Croatia) Tomislav Rukavina	(Croatia) Hrvoje Kurtović	Jako	Croatia Osiguranje
Rijeka	(Slovenia) Matjaž Kek	(Croatia) Dario Knežević	Lotto	—
Slaven Belupo	(Croatia) Elvis Scoria	(Croatia) Mato Grgić	Adidas	Belupo
RNK Split	(Croatia) Ivan Matić	(Croatia) Ivica Križanac	Jako	Skladgradnja
Zadar	(Croatia) Ferdo Milin	(Croatia) Jure Jerbić	Lotto	Hotel Kolovare

=== Managerial changes ===
Team	Outgoing manager	Manner of departure	Date of vacancy	Replaced by	Date of appointment	Position in table
Slaven Belupo	(Croatia) Roman Sović	Removed from position	26 May 2013	(Croatia) Ivan Katalinić	26 May 2013	Pre-season
RNK Split	(Croatia) Goran Sablić (caretaker)	Removed from position	26 May 2013	(Croatia) Stanko Mršić	4 June 2013	Pre-season
Osijek	(Croatia) Miroslav Žitnjak (caretaker)	Removed from position	26 May 2013	(Croatia) Tomislav Steinbrückner	5 June 2013	Pre-season
Osijek	(Croatia) Tomislav Steinbrückner	Resigned	18 August 2013	(Croatia) Davor Rupnik	19 August 2013	9th
Dinamo Zagreb	(Croatia) Krunoslav Jurčić	Sacked	21 August 2013	(Croatia) Damir Krznar (caretaker)	23 August 2013	1st
Hrvatski Dragovoljac	(Croatia) Krešimir Ganjto	Sacked	26 August 2013	(Croatia) Davor Mladina	27 August 2013	8th
Dinamo Zagreb	(Croatia) Damir Krznar (caretaker)	Removed from position	2 September 2013	(Croatia) Branko Ivanković	2 September 2013	1st
Slaven Belupo	(Croatia) Ivan Katalinić	Mutual consent	21 September 2013	(Croatia) Mladen Frančić	22 September 2013	10th
Osijek	(Croatia) Davor Rupnik	Sacked	21 October 2013	(Croatia) Ivica Kulešević	21 October 2013	10th
Dinamo Zagreb	(Croatia) Branko Ivanković	Sacked	22 October 2013	(Croatia) Zoran Mamić	22 October 2013	2nd
RNK Split	(Croatia) Stanko Mršić	Sacked	15 February 2014	(Croatia) Ivan Matić	24 February 2014	5th
Slaven Belupo	(Croatia) Mladen Frančić	Sacked	23 February 2014	(Croatia) Elvis Scoria	24 February 2014	8th
Osijek	(Croatia) Ivica Kulešević	Removed from position	26 February 2014	(Croatia) Tomislav Rukavina	27 February 2014	9th

== League table ==
Pos	Team	Pld	W	D	L	GF	GA	GD	Pts	Qualification or relegation
1	Dinamo Zagreb (C)	36	26	6	4	83	26	+57	84	Qualification to Champions League second qualifying round
2	Rijeka	36	21	10	5	72	35	+37	73	Qualification to Europa League second qualifying round
3	Hajduk Split	36	17	11	8	58	44	+14	62	Qualification to Europa League second qualifying round
4	RNK Split	36	14	10	12	41	41	0	52	Qualification to Europa League first qualifying round
5	Lokomotiva	36	15	7	14	57	59	−2	52	
6	Istra 1961	36	12	8	16	45	56	−11	44	
7	Zadar	36	10	5	21	35	67	−32	35	
8	Osijek	36	8	9	19	38	62	−24	33	
9	Slaven Belupo (O)	36	7	11	18	46	65	−19	32	Qualification to relegation play-off
10	Hrvatski Dragovoljac (R)	36	7	9	20	41	61	−20	30	Relegation to Croatian Second Football League

Source: Sportnet.hr
Rules for classification: 1) points; 2) goal difference; 3) number of goals scored.
For deciding champions, qualification to UEFA Europa League and relegation: 1st points; 2nd head-to-head points; 3rd head-to-head goal difference; 4th head-to-head away goals scored
(C) Champions; (O) Play-off winners; (R) Relegated

== Results ==
Home \ Away	DIN	HAJ	HRD	IST	LOK	OSI	RIJ	SLA	SPL	ZAD	DIN	HAJ	HRD	IST	LOK	OSI	RIJ	SLA	SPL	ZAD
Dinamo Zagreb		2–2	4–1	3–1	2–1	3–1	1–0	1–0	1–0	3–0		3–0 (Note: The match was abandoned in the 85th minute at the result 1–0 for Dinamo Zagreb. It was later awarded as a 3–0 forfeit win to Dinamo Zagreb.)	5–0	6–0	2–1	4–1	4–0	3–0	2–1	3–1
Hajduk Split	2–0		2–1	2–0	3–1	1–1	1–1	1–0	0–0	1–0	0–2		2–1	0–1	2–2	4–2	2–2	3–0	1–0	3–1
Hrvatski Dragovoljac	1–1	1–2		0–1	0–2	1–0	0–2	0–0	2–2	0–2	0–1	4–1		1–2	1–3	2–0	0–2	3–3	3–2	2–1
Istra 1961	1–3	1–0	2–1		1–2	1–1	2–3	1–1	1–1	0–1	2–1	1–1	1–2		2–4	0–0	0–1	3–3	2–0	0–2
Lokomotiva	0–3	1–3	2–1	2–1		5–0	0–2	1–0	1–1	2–0	1–1	0–2	2–1	3–2		1–2	1–5	1–0	0–0	1–3
Osijek	0–1	1–0	1–1	1–3	1–2		1–3	2–1	0–0	0–0	3–2	1–1	1–1	0–1	1–1		2–0	4–1	3–1	4–0
Rijeka	0–0	1–1	2–0	3–0	1–1	5–1		2–2	1–1	3–0	2–2	4–1	3–1	3–3	3–2	1–0		2–0	4–1	3–0
Slaven Belupo	1–3	3–3	2–2	2–2	3–2	2–0	0–1		1–2	1–1	1–6	3–0	1–1	0–2	2–1	2–1	0–3		1–2	5–1
RNK Split	1–0	0–3	1–0	0–1	3–0	4–0	1–0	2–1		1–3	0–3	1–2	2–1	2–0	1–1	1–0	2–2	0–0		3–1
Zadar	0–0	1–5	1–1	0–4	0–2	3–1	1–2	0–2	0–1		1–2	1–1	0–4	1–0	3–4	3–1	1–0	2–1	0–1	

Source: Sportnet.hr
Legend: Blue = home team win; Yellow = draw; Red = away team win.

=== Relegation play-off ===
==== First leg ====
25 May 2014
19:00

Cibalia	2–2	Slaven Belupo
Puljić 52'; Fuštar 76' (o.g.)	Report (in Croatian)	Ozobić 14', 72'

Stadion HNK Cibalia, Vinkovci
Attendance: 2,500
Referee: Ivan Bebek (Rijeka)

==== Second leg ====
29 May 2014
19:00

Slaven Belupo	2–1	Cibalia
Fuštar 24'; Delić 36'	Report (in Croatian)	Muženjak 22'

Gradski stadion, Koprivnica
Attendance: 3,000
Referee: Ivan Bebek (Rijeka)

Slaven Belupo won 4–3 on aggregate

== Top goalscorers ==
As of 17 May 2014; Source: Sportnet.hr UEFA.com Prva-HNL.hr

Rank	Player	Club(s)	Goals	Apps	Minutes played
1	(Croatia) Duje Čop	Dinamo Zagreb	22	33	2353
2	(Croatia) Andrej Kramarić	Dinamo Zagreb, Rijeka	18	28	2107
3	(Croatia) Leon Benko	Rijeka	16	20	1676
3	(Algeria) El Arbi Hillel Soudani	Dinamo Zagreb	16	31	2231
6	(Bosnia and Herzegovina) Ivan Krstanović	Rijeka	14	24	1204
6	(Croatia) Ante Budimir	Lokomotiva	14	27	1840
8	(Chile) Junior Fernandes	Dinamo Zagreb	13	28	2198
9	(Croatia) Anton Maglica	Hajduk Split	12	31	2372
10	(Croatia) Mario Pašalić	Hajduk Split	11	30	2435
11	(Croatia) Stipe Bačelić-Grgić	Hrvatski Dragovoljac	10	24	2020

== Awards ==
=== Annual awards ===
Award	Winner	Club
Player of the Season	(Croatia) Andrej Kramarić	Rijeka
Manager of the Season	(Slovenia) Matjaž Kek	Rijeka
Young Player of the Season	(Croatia) Mario Pašalić	Hajduk Split
Goalkeeper of the Season	(Croatia) Ivan Vargić	Rijeka

Team of the Year
Goalkeeper	(Croatia) Vargić (Rijeka)			
Defence	(Croatia) Ivan Tomečak (Rijeka)	(Croatia) Mario Maloča (Hajduk Split)	(Croatia) Josip Šimunić (Dinamo Zagreb)	(Croatia) Josip Pivarić (Dinamo Zagreb)
Midfield	(Algeria) Hillal Soudani (Dinamo Zagreb)	(Croatia) Mario Pašalić (Hajduk Split)	(Croatia) Marcelo Brozović (Dinamo Zagreb)	(Croatia) Ivan Močinić (Rijeka)
Attack	(Croatia) Andrej Kramarić (Lokomotiva)		(Croatia) Duje Čop (Dinamo Zagreb)	

== Attendances ==
#	Club	Average
1	Hajduk	9,806
2	Rijeka	5,444
3	Dinamo Zagreb	4,457
4	Osijek	2,811
5	Istra	2,556
6	Slaven	1,728
7	Zadar	1,622
8	Hrvatski	1,328
9	Radnički	1,239
10	Lokomotiva	681
