= Vladimir Kragić =

Croatian footballer (1910–1975)

Personal information
- Date of birth: 8 June 1910
- Place of birth: Split, Austria-Hungary
- Date of death: 17 September 1975 (aged 65)
- Place of death: Split, SFR Yugoslavia
- Positions: Left back; left winger

Senior career*
Years	Team	Apps	(Gls)
1929–1939	Hajduk Split	137	(78)

International career
1930–1934	Yugoslavia	6	(4)
- * Club domestic league appearances and goals

Vladimir Kragić (8 June 1910 – 17 September 1975) was a Yugoslav professional footballer.

== Club career ==
Born in Split, Kragić spent his entire career playing for his hometown club Hajduk Split, for whom he appeared in a total of 354 matches and scored 266 goals in the period between 1929 and 1939.

Although he played as a left back in the early days of his career, he later proved to be a very successful goalscorer once he changed position to left winger and forward in the 1930s and was top scorer in the 1932–33 Yugoslav First League season with 21 goals.

== International career ==
Kragić was also capped six times for the Kingdom of Yugoslavia national team. His international debut came on 4 May 1930 in a friendly against Romania and his last appearance was on 29 April 1934 against the same opponent in a 1934 World Cup qualifier.
