= Marko Trojak =

Croatian football midfielder (born 1988)

Personal information
- Date of birth: 28 March 1988 (age 38)
- Place of birth: Varaždin, Croatia
- Height: 1.86 m (6 ft 1 in)
- Position: Midfielder

Youth career
- 2004–2006: Varteks

Senior career*
| Years | Team | Apps | (Gls) |
| 2007–2008 | Varteks | 0 | (0) |
| 2007 | → Sloboda Tužno (loan) | | |
| 2008 | → Sloboda Varaždin (loan) | | |
| 2008–2009 | Virovitica | | |
| 2009–2010 | Drava Ptuj | 8 | (0) |
| 2010–2011 | Lokomotiva Zagreb | 14 | (0) |
| 2011–2012 | Varaždin | 6 | (0) |
| 2012–2013 | Zelina | 19 | (1) |
| 2014 | SV Rödinghausen | 0 | (0) |
| 2014–2015 | SV Marsch Neuberg | 28 | (1) |
| 2016 | Istra 1961 | 13 | (0) |
| 2017–2018 | Brežice | 17 | (5) |
| 2018–2019 | Međimurje | 14 | (2) |
- * Club domestic league appearances and goals as of 7 January 2023

Marko Trojak (born 28 March 1988 in Varaždin) is a Croatian retired football midfielder.

== Club career ==
Trojak went through the ranks of his hometown club Varteks's academy, but left the club without debuting for the first team in 2008 after a year and a half on loan to his club's feeder teams. His next club would be third-tier NK Virovitica, before experiencing first-tier football in Slovenia, having joined the ailing NK Drava Ptuj following a trial. In 2010, he moved back to Croatia, joining NK Lokomotiva, and, in April 2011, helped inflict his former club (which had changed its name from Varteks to NK Varaždin) their first loss on home turf after over a year, by assisting Nino Bule for the sole goal of the match. He went on to rejoin Varaždin that summer, participating in the club's Europa League qualifications campaign which was narrowly ended by Dinamo Bucharest with 4-3 aggregate, but would feature in only 6 league matches before the club was expelled from Croatia's top league, Prva HNL, and subsequently folded. After a season at second-tier NK Zelina, Trojak spent most of the next two and a half years two lower-tier Austrian and German clubs. In the 2015/16 winter transfer period he returned to Prva HNL football after going on trial with NK Istra 1961 and passing.
