= Damir Burić (footballer) =

Croatian footballer and manager

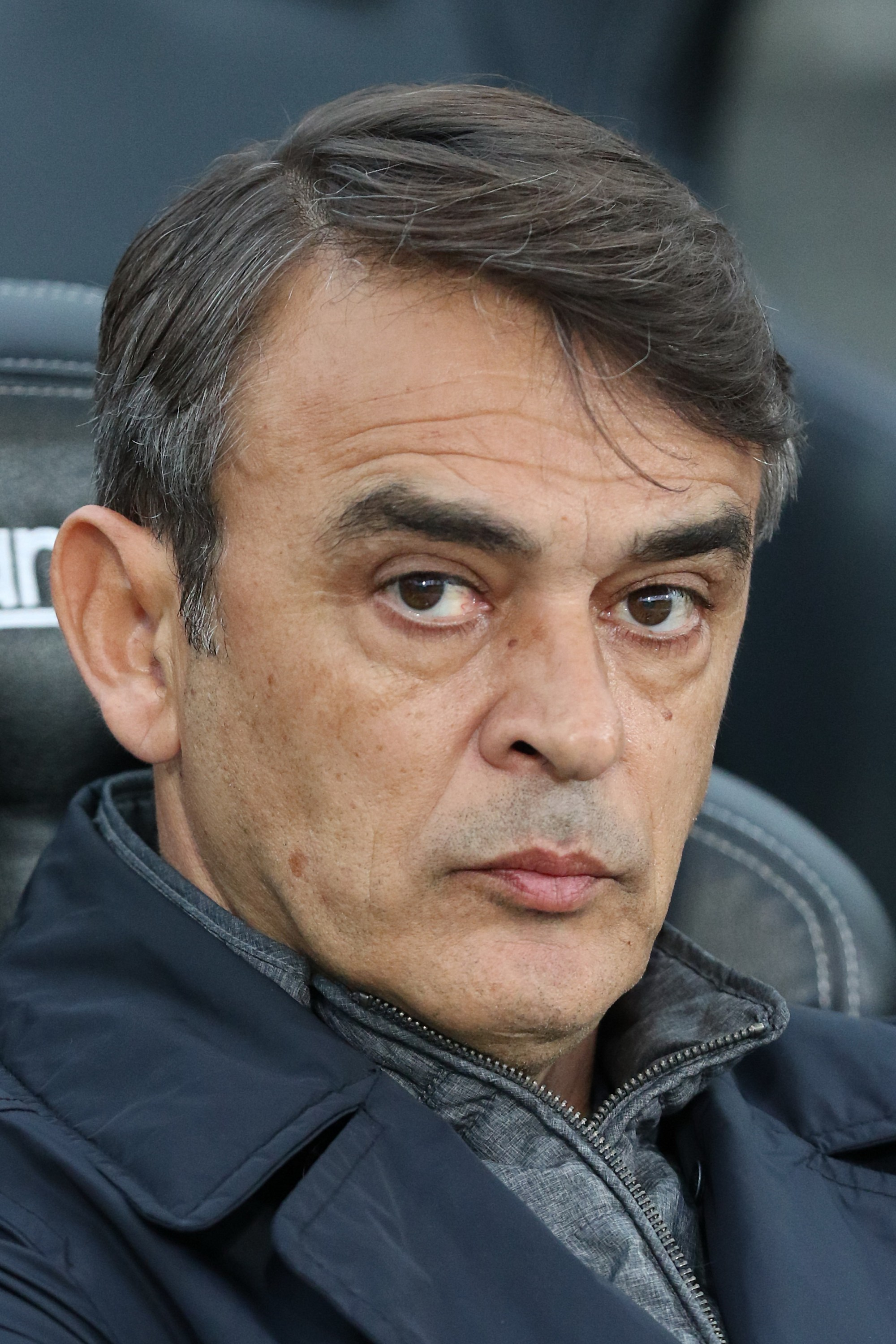
- Burić as manager of Admira Wacker in 2017

Personal information
- Date of birth: 7 July 1964 (age 62)
- Place of birth: Split, SR Croatia, Yugoslavia
- Height: 1.82 m (6 ft 0 in)
- Position: Defender

Team information
- Current team: (manager)

Youth career
- –1984: GOŠK Dubrovnik

Senior career*
Years	Team	Apps	(Gls)
1984–1988	RNK Split		
1988–1992	Waldhof Mannheim	57	(2)
1992–1999	SC Freiburg	121	(9)
1999–2000	Borussia Mönchengladbach	13	(0)

Managerial career
- 2004–2007: Freiburg II (assistant)
- 2005–2011: Freiburg (assistant)
- 2011–2012: Bayer Leverkusen (assistant)
- 2013–2014: Werder Bremen (assistant)
- 2015–2016: Hajduk Split
- 2017: Admira Wacker
- 2017–2019: Greuther Fürth
- 2019: Hajduk Split
- 2020–2021: Admira Wacker
- 2022–2023: Al-Riyadh
- 2023–2024: Ohod
- 2024–2025: Al-Arabi
- 2025–2026: Abha
- * Club domestic league appearances and goals

Damir Burić (born 7 July 1964), popularly known as Šolta, is a Croatian professional football manager and former player.

While playing in Croatia, he got the nickname "Šolta" after the island of Šolta, because roots of his family are from that island.

== Playing career ==
Burić started off his career at GOŠK Dubrovnik, before signing with hometown club RNK Split, where he stayed until 1988, when he went to Germany and became the new player of SV Waldhof Mannheim. He stayed there for four years, until 1992, playing over 50 league games for the club. In the summer od 1992, Burić signed with, back then, 2. Bundesliga club SC Freiburg. In the 1992–93 season, he won the 2. Bundesliga with Freiburg and got qualified to the Bundesliga. He stayed at the club until 1999 (making over 100 league appearances in the process), before going to Borussia Mönchengladbach. He played for the club for one season, until the end of the 1999–00 2. Bundesliga season, after which he decided to end his playing career in July 2000 at the age of 36.

== Managerial career ==
Burić worked in Germany as assistant coach of Freiburg II, Freiburg, Bayer Leverkusen and Werder Bremen.

On 29 May 2015, he was appointed manager of Prva HNL club Hajduk Split. On 2 June 2016, Burić was sacked after underperforming in the league. In January 2017, he was appointed manager of Austrian Bundesliga club Admira Wacker.

On 9 September 2017, he moved to 2. Bundesliga club SpVgg Greuther Fürth. Almost two and a half years after being given the Greuther Fürth job, Burić got sacked on 4 February 2019, because of the poor results.

On 20 July 2019 following the departure of Siniša Oreščanin, he was hired to be Hajduk Split manager for the second time in his career. On 19 December 2019, he was sacked.

On 22 September 2020, he returned to Admira Wacker.

On 18 September 2022, Burić was appointed as manager of Saudi Arabian club Al-Riyadh. He led the club to promotion to the Saudi Professional League for the first time since 2005.

On 30 September 2023, Burić was appointed as manager of Saudi First Division club Ohod.

On 4 October 2024, Burić was appointed as manager of Al-Arabi. He was sacked on 5 March 2025.

On 1 August 2025, Burić was appointed as manager of Abha.

== Managerial statistics ==
As of match played 5 March 2025

Managerial record by team and tenure
Team	Nat	From	To	Record				
Team	Nat	From	To	P	W	D	L	Win %
Hajduk Split	(Croatia)	29 May 2015	2 June 2016	49	24	11	14	48.98
Admira Wacker	(Austria)	3 January 2017	9 September 2017	26	11	5	10	42.31
Greuther Fürth	(Germany)	9 September 2017	4 February 2019	51	16	15	20	31.37
Hajduk Split	(Croatia)	20 July 2019	19 December 2019	21	11	5	5	52.38
Admira Wacker	(Austria)	22 September 2020	26 April 2021	26	5	6	15	19.23
Al-Riyadh	(Saudi Arabia)	18 September 2022	1 June 2023	29	17	6	6	58.62
Ohod	(Saudi Arabia)	30 September 2023	1 June 2024	28	6	14	8	21.43
Al-Arabi	(Saudi Arabia)	4 October 2024	5 March 2025	19	7	5	7	36.84
Abha	(Saudi Arabia)	1 August 2025		0	0	0	0	—
Total				249	97	67	85	38.96

== Honours ==
=== Player ===
Freiburg

- 2. Bundesliga: 1992–93
