= Nikola Gazdić =

Croatian footballer

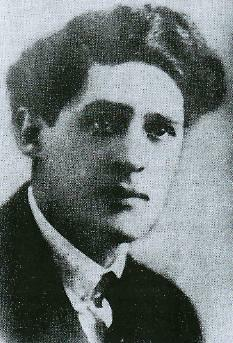
Nikola Gazdić

Nikola Gazdić-Janjčić (died 22 May 1921) was a footballer who played for Hajduk Split. Gazdić was the first Hajduk player to score more than 100 goals. He died of late stage tuberculosis after playing against Građanski Zagreb, Hajduk's greatest rival at the time, in a 2-1 victory (he scored a goal for 1-1 and was awarded a penalty that Mantler realised for 2-1 victory). He scored 106 goals in 91 matches.

Leo Lemešić named Gazdić one of the four greatest footballers in Hajduk's history.
