= Hari Vukas =

Croatian footballer and manager

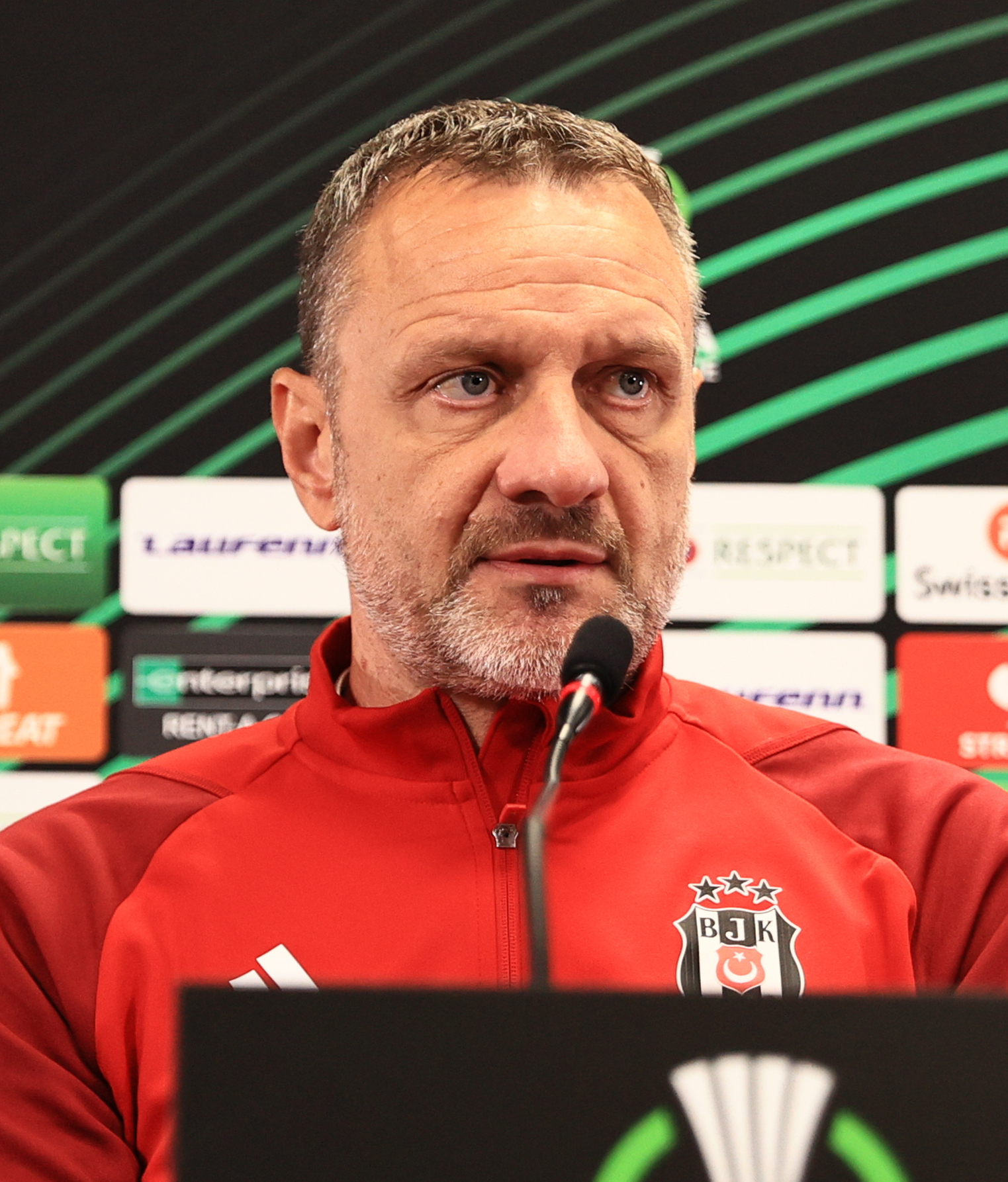
- Vukas with Beşiktaş in 2023

Personal information
- Full name: Hari Vukas
- Date of birth: 6 October 1972 (age 54)
- Place of birth: Split, SR Croatia, SFR Yugoslavia
- Position: Forward

Youth career
- –1990: Hajduk Split

Senior career*
Years	Team	Apps	(Gls)
1990–1994	Hajduk Split	15	(5)
1993–1994	→ Primorac Stobreč (loan)	32	(15)
1995	Zadar	13	(6)
1995–1997	Segesta	55	(25)
1997–1999	NK Zagreb	24	(5)
1999	Cibalia		
2000	Charleroi		
2000–2001	Troglav 1918		
2001	Domžale		
Total		159	(57)

Managerial career
- Dugopolje
- Zagora Unešić
- Dinara
- 2013: Primorac Stobreč (assistant)
- 2013–2015: Hajduk Split (assistant)
- 2015: Hajduk Split (interim)
- 2015: Hajduk Split
- 2016–2017: Karabükspor (assistant)
- 2017: Galatasaray (assistant)
- 2018: Udinese (assistant)
- 2019: Zrinjski Mostar
- 2020: Hajduk Split (assistant)
- 2020: Hajduk Split
- 2021: Dugopolje
- 2022–2023: Olympique Marseille (assistant)
- 2023: Beşiktaş (assistant)
- 2024–2025: Kayserispor (assistant)
- * Club domestic league appearances and goals

Hari Vukas (born 6 October 1972) is a Croatian professional football manager and former player.

== Managerial career ==
After having spells as head coach of Dugopolje, Zagora Unešić and Dinara, and as assistant coach of Primorac 1929 and Hajduk Split, Vukas was hired as interim manager by Hajduk following the resignation of Igor Tudor in February 2015. Soon he was named manager permanently but in May of the same year he was sacked and replaced by Damir Burić.

In the period between 2016 and 2018 Vukas worked as assistant coach to Igor Tudor at Karabükspor, Galatasaray and Udinese. On 12 June 2019, he was appointed head coach of Bosnian Premier League club Zrinjski Mostar, following the resignation of Blaž Slišković. Following a 0–2 away defeat against Zvijezda 09 on 2 November 2019, Vukas was fired from Zrinjski two days later.

On 23 December 2019, Tudor and Vukas returned to Hajduk Split; Tudor was appointed head coach, while Vukas his assistant. On 21 August 2020, following the appointment of Tudor as Juventus assistant coach, Vukas was named interim manager of Hajduk. On 8 September, it was announced Vukas would take on the role permanently. Following the dismisses of the advisor Mario Stanić and the director of football Ivan Kepčija by newly elected president Lukša Jakobušić, Vukas was fired from Hajduk on 4 November 2020. He was again manager of Dugopolje from July until December 2021.

== Managerial statistics ==
As of match played 29 December 2021

Managerial record by team and tenure
Team	Nat	From	To	Record				
Team	Nat	From	To	G	W	D	L	Win %
Hajduk Split (interim)	(Croatia)	5 February 2015	18 February 2015	3	2	0	1	66.67
Hajduk Split	(Croatia)	24 April 2015	30 May 2015	7	4	1	2	57.14
Zrinjski Mostar	(Bosnia and Herzegovina)	12 June 2019	4 November 2019	23	13	3	7	56.52
Hajduk Split	(Croatia)	21 August 2020	4 November 2020	10	4	1	5	40.00
Dugopolje	(Croatia)	1 July 2021	29 December 2021	14	6	3	5	42.86
Total				57	29	8	20	50.88

== Honours ==
=== Player ===
Hajduk Split

- Prva HNL: 1992
- Yugoslav Cup: 1990–91
- Croatian Cup: 1992–93
- Croatian Super Cup: 1994
