= Janko Rodin =

Croatian footballer (1900–1974)

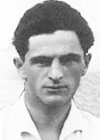

Personal information
- Date of birth: 17 February 1900
- Place of birth: Kaštel Lukšić, Austro-Hungary
- Date of death: 14 September 1974 (aged 74)
- Place of death: Kaštel Lukšić, SFR Yugoslavia
- Positions: Defender; midfielder

Senior career*
Years	Team	Apps	(Gls)
1920–1922	Hajduk Split		
1922–1923	Slavia Prague		
1923–1925	Hajduk Split		
1925–1927	BSK Belgrade		
1928–1931	Hajduk Split		

International career
1924–1926	Kingdom of SCS	4	(0)
- * Club domestic league appearances and goals

Janko Rodin (17 February 1900 – 14 September 1974) was a Croatian footballer and later president of HNK Hajduk Split.

== Career ==
Born in Kaštel Lukšić, Austro-Hungary (nowadays Croatia), he played either as full-back or winger. He started his career in Hajduk Split immediately after the end of the First World War and will spend most of his playing career at Hajduk. The exception was a period of time that he worked as a customs officer in Belgrade and during that time he played with BSK Belgrade. He also played one season in Czechoslovakia with Slavia Prague. He finished his career in 1931.

After retiring, he became the president of Hajduk Split in 1939. He headed the Hajduk delegation that, on 23 April 1944, got on board of Yugoslav Partisans armed boat "Topčider" and escaped Axis-occupied Split towards the free island of Vis. He was Hajduk president until 1945. He died in Kaštel Lukšić on 14 September 1974.

== International career ==
He made his debut for Yugoslavia in a February 1924 friendly match against Austria and earned a total of 4 caps, scoring no goals (3 as member of Hajduk during 1924 and one as member of BSK in 1926). Rodin was part of the Yugoslav football team at the 1924 Summer Olympics. His final international was an October 1926 King Alexander's Cup match against Romania.

== Honours ==
Hajduk Split

- Yugoslav championship: 1929

Preceded by Petar Machiedo	President of Hajduk Split; June 1939 – August 1941; May 1944 – October 1945	Succeeded by Humbert Fabris
