= Tomislav Rukavina =

Croatian footballer (born 1974)

Personal information
- Date of birth: 14 October 1974 (age 52)
- Place of birth: Osijek, SR Croatia, SFR Yugoslavia
- Height: 1.77 m (5 ft 10 in)
- Position: Midfielder

Team information
- Current team: Croatia U17 (manager)

Youth career
- Osijek
- 1991–1992: Hajduk Split

Senior career*
Years	Team	Apps	(Gls)
1992–1993	Osijek	30	(1)
1994–1995	NK Zagreb	57	(1)
1996–1999	Dinamo Zagreb	123	(9)
2000–2003	Venezia	50	(2)
2003–2005	Hajduk Split	65	(6)

International career
1996–1999	Croatia	5	(0)

Managerial career
- 2009-2010: Dinamo Zagreb (assistant)
- 2011: Lokomotiva Zagreb (assistant)
- 2011: Dinamo Zagreb (assistant)
- 2012: Dinamo Zagreb U19 (co-manager)
- 2013: Dinamo Zagreb (assistant)
- 2014–2015: Osijek
- 2017-2018: Dinamo Zagreb U19
- 2019–: Croatia U17
- 2020: Croatia U21
- * Club domestic league appearances and goals

Tomislav Rukavina (born 14 October 1974) is a Croatian professional football manager and former player who is the manager of the Croatia national U-17 team.

== Club career ==
In 1992 Rukavina started his football career in his hometown of Osijek, before moving to NK Zagreb during his second season. After 57 appearances for NK Zagreb, he was transferred to Dinamo (then called Croatia Zagreb), where he won four national championships. He played four seasons in Italy for S.S.C. Venezia before returning to his homeland and finishing his career at Hajduk Split. He won the HNL seven times and the Croatian cup three times.

== International career ==
Rukavina made his international debut for the Croatia national team against Poland in the 2–1 friendly win at Rijeka on 28 February 1996. He made five appearances for Croatia. His final international was a November 1999 friendly away against France.

== Managerial career ==
Rukavina became first team coach at Dinamo in March 2009., after arriving of Krunoslav Jurčić. He took charge of NK Osijek in March 2014. He became a youth coach at Dinamo in June 2017.
