= Duje Čop =

Croatian footballer

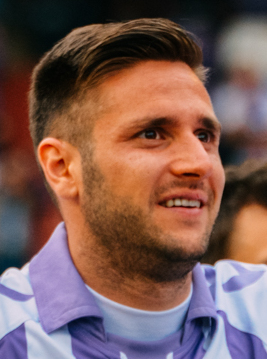
- Čop with Valladolid in 2019

Personal information
- Date of birth: 1 February 1990 (age 36)
- Place of birth: Vinkovci, SR Croatia, Yugoslavia
- Height: 1.84 m (6 ft 0 in)
- Position: Forward

Youth career
- 1998–2000: Lokomotiva Vinkovci
- 2000–2002: HNK Cibalia
- 2002–2007: Hajduk Split

Senior career*
| Years | Team | Apps | (Gls) |
| 2007–2008 | Hajduk Split | 15 | (2) |
| 2008–2009 | Nacional | 5 | (1) |
| 2009–2011 | Hajduk Split | 24 | (8) |
| 2011–2012 | RNK Split | 29 | (8) |
| 2012–2015 | Dinamo Zagreb | 67 | (43) |
| 2015–2017 | Cagliari | 16 | (4) |
| 2015–2016 | → Málaga (loan) | 31 | (7) |
| 2016–2017 | → Sporting Gijón (loan) | 31 | (9) |
| 2017–2021 | Standard Liège | 48 | (6) |
| 2018–2019 | → Valladolid (loan) | 18 | (0) |
| 2021–2023 | Dinamo Zagreb | 8 | (1) |
| 2022 | → Celje (loan) | 8 | (1) |
| 2022–2023 | → Šibenik (loan) | 21 | (4) |
| 2023–2025 | Lokomotiva | 40 | (18) |
| 2025–2026 | Rijeka | 40 | (5) |

International career
| 2006 | Croatia U16 | 8 | (1) |
| 2006 | Croatia U17 | 1 | (1) |
| 2009–2010 | Croatia U20 | 2 | (0) |
| 2011–2012 | Croatia U21 | 6 | (1) |
| 2014–2018 | Croatia | 14 | (2) |

Managerial career
- 2026–: Rijeka (assistant)
- * Club domestic league appearances and goals as of 23 May 2026

Duje Čop (born 1 February 1990) is a Croatian former professional footballer who played as a forward. He is current assistant coach of Croatian Football League club Rijeka.

Čop made over 200 appearances and scored over 80 goals in the Croatian Football League, for Hajduk Split, RNK Split, Dinamo Zagreb, Šibenik and Lokomotiva. He also finished as the league's top scorer in 2013–14, when he won the league title with Dinamo. Čop also played in the top divisions of Portugal, Italy, Spain, Belgium and Slovenia, totalling 80 games and 16 goals in La Liga for Málaga, Sporting Gijón and Valladolid.

Čop earned 14 caps and scored two international goals for Croatia between 2014 and 2018, and represented the country at UEFA Euro 2016.

== Club career ==
=== Hajduk Split / Nacional ===
Čop turned professional in 2007–08 at only age 17, helping local Hajduk Split finish fifth in the top division. In his first professional season with Hajduk, he made 15 appearances and scored 2 goals. In July 2008, at the end of the season, he joined Nacional in Portugal.

Scarcely used during his only season in Madeira (174 minutes in official games), Čop made his Primeira Liga debut on 24 January 2009 in a 1–1 home draw against Sporting Clube de Portugal. On 6 April, he scored his only goal in Portuguese football, replacing Mateus in added time away to Rio Ave and concluding a 3–0 win.

He subsequently returned to Hajduk, being sparingly used over the course of two campaigns.

=== RNK Split ===
In July 2011, Čop terminated his contract with Hajduk and signed a four-year deal with neighbouring RNK Split.

He made his debut for the team in a UEFA Europa League qualifying match against Slovenian side Domžale, scoring a goal in the away win. It was Split's first ever goal in European competitions. He also netted another goal against the same side in the second leg.

=== Dinamo Zagreb ===
In June 2012, he moved to defending champions GNK Dinamo Zagreb. He started the season with a goal against Sheriff Tiraspol in UEFA Champions League qualifying match at the Maksimir Stadium. He scored another important goal on Dinamo Zagreb road to 2012–13 Champions League, in the play-off match against Maribor. He made six appearances in the competition's group stage. On 18 February 2013, he scored his first hat-trick for Dinamo Zagreb in a derby match against Rijeka. He finished as the 2013–14 Prva HNL top goalscorer with 22 goals.

=== Cagliari ===
On 11 January 2015, Čop transferred to Italian club Cagliari. Three days later, he made his debut for them, playing the full 90 minutes in a 2–1 loss away to Parma in the round of 16 of the 2014–15 Coppa Italia. On 24 January, he scored his first goal in Serie A, the winner in a 2–1 home triumph over Sassuolo, as a substitute for Samuele Longo. On 26 April, he scored twice as the relegation-threatened Sardinians won 3–1 at Fiorentina; he totalled four goals from 16 appearances as the season ended with descent.

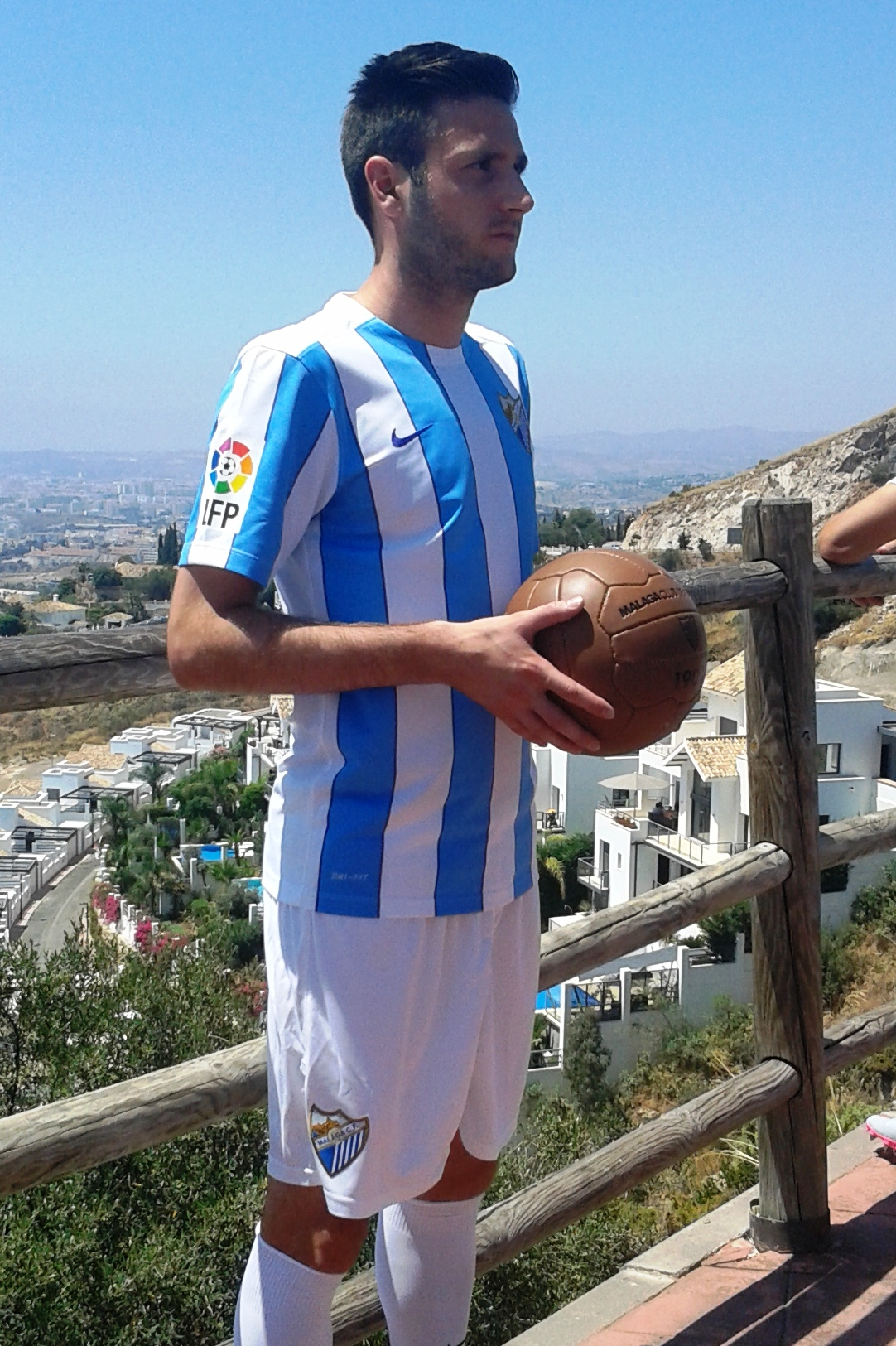
Čop presented at Málaga in 2015

On 16 July 2015, Čop moved to Málaga on a season-long loan deal. He made his La Liga debut on 21 August, starting as the campaign began with a goalless home draw against fellow Andalusians Sevilla. On 13 December, Čop scored his first goal for the Boquerones, an 87th-minute winner in a 2–1 victory at Rayo Vallecano. On the same day, he threatened to leave if his playing time would not increase.

In July 2016, Čop was loaned to Sporting de Gijón. On 26 November, he missed a late penalty in a 2–1 away loss against Real Madrid. He totalled nine goals for the Asturians, who were relegated at the end of the season.

=== Standard Liege ===
On 30 August 2017, Čop completed a €3 million move to Standard Liège in the Belgian First Division A. He scored his first goal on 20 September to conclude a 4–0 home win over Heist in the sixth round of the cup, followed four days later with a first league goal to equalise in a 2–1 win over Lokeren also at the Stade Maurice Dufrasne.

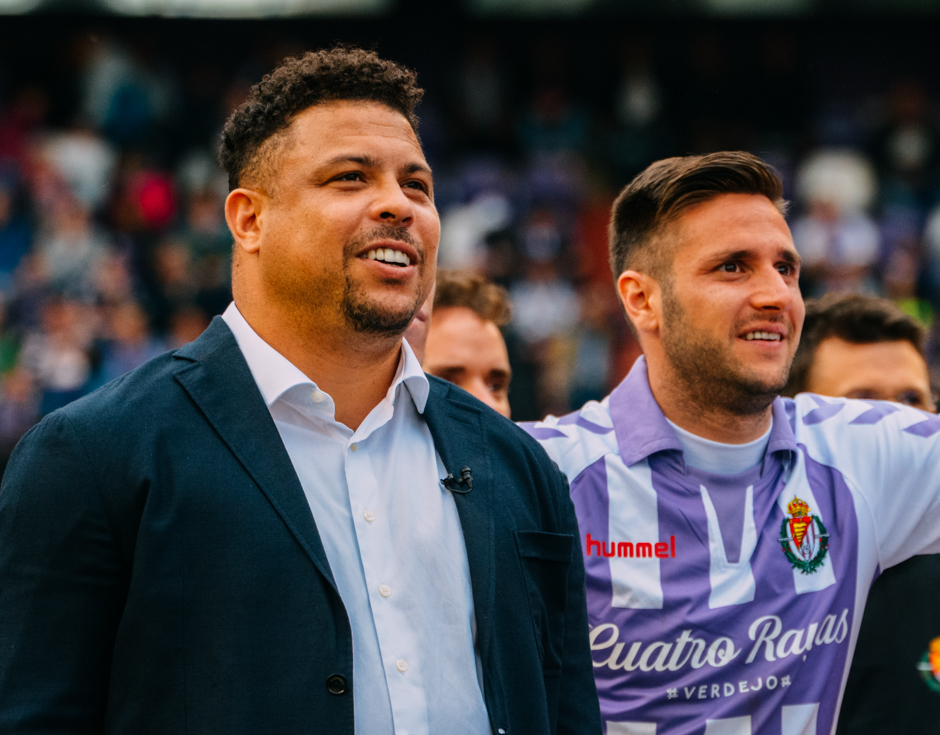
Čop (right) and Valladolid owner Ronaldo in 2019

Čop played mostly as a substitute for Standard. On 17 March, he came on in the 97th minute for Edmilson Junior as they beat Genk 1–0 in extra time to win the 2018 Belgian Cup Final and qualify for the UEFA Europa League.

On 19 August 2018 Čop agreed to a one-year loan deal with Real Valladolid. He did not score in 21 games for the club.

In 2020–21, Čop played only 424 minutes of league football for Standard, being out of the plans of managers Philippe Montanier and Mbaye Leye. He scored once that season, in a 3–2 Europa League group loss at Rangers on 3 December.

=== Return to Dinamo ===
In June 2021, Čop returned to Dinamo Zagreb after six years away. Having barely played, he was loaned to Celje of the Slovenian PrvaLiga at the start of February. Again, he played mainly from the bench, including when he scored his only goal for the club from the penalty spot in a 4–2 win at Olimpija Ljubljana.

=== Lokomotiva ===
On 29 September 2023, after his contract with Dinamo had expired, Čop signed for fellow Croatian Football League club Lokomotiva Zagreb on a free transfer.

=== Rijeka ===
On 27 January 2025, Čop signed for a Croatian Football League club Rijeka on a two and a half-year deal.

== International career ==
Čop made his senior international debut for Croatia on 4 September 2014, replacing Luka Modrić for the final 30 minutes of a 3–0 friendly win over Cyprus in Pula.

He made one appearance in Croatia's successful qualification campaign for UEFA Euro 2016; against Bulgaria on 10 October 2015, he came on for Marko Pjaca at the same mark and was sent off at the end of a 3–0 win for a foul on Strahil Popov.

Čop was part of Croatia's Euro 2016 squad and made his UEFA European Championship debut in 2–1 group stage win against defending champions Spain. He scored his first international goal in a 3–0 friendly win over Northern Ireland on 15 November 2016.

In May 2018 Čop was named in Croatia's preliminary 32-man squad for the 2018 World Cup in Russia, but did not make the final 23.

== Personal life ==
Čop's father Davor was also a footballer and a forward. He played for six seasons with Hajduk Split in the 1970s and 1980s.

== Career statistics ==
=== International ===
Scores and results list Croatia's goal tally first, score column indicates score after each Čop goal.

List of international goals scored by Duje Čop
| No | Date | Venue | Opponent | Score | Result | Competition |
|---|---|---|---|---|---|---|
| 1 | 15 November 2016 | Windsor Park, Belfast, Northern Ireland | Northern Ireland | 2–0 | 3–0 | Friendly |
| 2 | 27 May 2017 | Los Angeles Memorial Coliseum, Los Angeles, United States | Mexico | 1–0 | 2–1 | Friendly |

== Honours ==
=== Club ===
Hajduk Split

- Croatian Football Cup: 2009–10

Dinamo Zagreb

- Croatian Football League: 2012–13, 2013–14
- Croatian Super Cup: 2013

Standard Liège

- Belgian Cup: 2017–18

Rijeka

- Croatian Football League: 2024–25
- Croatian Football Cup: 2024–25

=== Individual ===
- Prva HNL Top goalscorer: 2013–14
- SN Yellow Shirt Award: 2013–14
