= Željko Kopić =

Croatian footballer and manager

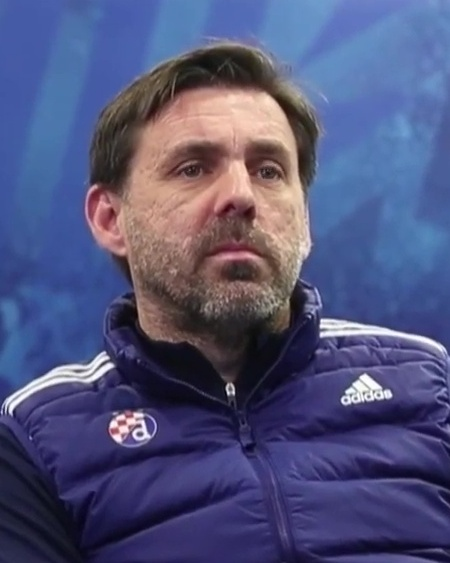
- Kopić as coach of Dinamo Zagreb in 2021

Personal information
- Date of birth: 10 September 1977 (age 49)
- Place of birth: Osijek, SR Croatia, SFR Yugoslavia
- Position: Midfielder

Senior career*
Years	Team	Apps	(Gls)
- Čakovec
2000–2001	Marsonia	17	(2)
- Sydney United
- Hrvatski Dragovoljac

Managerial career
- 2009: Zagorec
- 2009–2010: Segesta
- 2011–2012: Lučko
- 2012: Cibalia
- 2014–2015: NK Zagreb
- 2015–2017: Slaven Belupo
- 2017–2018: Hajduk Split
- 2018–2019: Pafos
- 2021–2022: Dinamo Zagreb
- 2022: Botev Plovdiv
- 2023–2026: Dinamo București
- 2026: Wieczysta Kraków
- * Club domestic league appearances and goals

Željko Kopić (born 10 September 1977) is a Croatian professional football manager and former player who was most recently in charge of Ekstraklasa club Wieczysta Kraków.

== Playing career ==
In his playing days, Željko Kopić played as a midfielder. He played in the younger age categories of Osijek and Dinamo Zagreb. In his senior career, he played for Croatian clubs Čakovec, Marsonia and Hrvatski Dragovoljac and an Australian club Sydney United.

== Managerial career ==
After his playing career, Željko Kopić became a coach. In 2006, he received the UEFA B coaching diploma, and since 2013 he has the UEFA PRO coaching diploma. At the beginning of his coaching career, he worked at the football school of Hrvatski Dragovoljac, and later became an assistant coach of the first team.

His first independent job in senior football was Zagorec from Krapina, after which he took over Segesta from Sisak. Then, he worked first as an assistant, and later as the first coach at Lučko, which was then playing in the Croatian top division. After that, he worked for a short time in Cibalia. In June 2014, he became the coach of NK Zagreb.

Towards the beginning of the next season, he became the coach of Slaven Belupo from Koprivnica, where he stayed for 96 games and became the longest-serving coach in the 110-year-old history of the club. With Slaven Belupo, he played the final of the Croatian Football Cup against Dinamo Zagreb. He left them in October 2017.

On 13 November 2017, he was named as the new Hajduk Split manager. In 34 official matches at Hajduk, he achieved 6 consecutive victories away from home and 6 consecutive victories in the national league and cup.

In October 2018, he was appointed coach of the Cypriot first league side Pafos, where he won the Coach of the Month award and achieved significant victories against the big Cypriot clubs such as Apoel, Omonia and AEK.

Upon his return to Croatia, he became the academy director of Dinamo Zagreb's football school, which is known as one of the best football schools in the world. In December 2021, after the departure of Damir Krznar, he was appointed as the coach of the first team and became the seventh coach to lead the two biggest Croatian clubs, Dinamo and Hajduk Split. With Dinamo, he achieved seven consecutive victories in the HNL and European competitions, among which the 1–0 victory against West Ham United and the 1–0 victory against Sevilla in the knockout phase of the UEFA Europa League stand out the most. The win over West Ham United was the first victory of a Croatian club against an English side on their home ground in the history of Croatian club football.

In August 2022, Kopić became the coach of the Bulgarian first division side Botev Plovdiv and during his engagement, which lasted four months, he raised the club from the last place in the table to the 10th place.

In December 2023, he became the head coach of Dinamo București. Despite the tough situation when he arrived, Kopić managed to save the club from relegation, and Dinamo București remained in Liga I. After the first half of the 2024–25 season, Dinamo held second place with a 24–17 goal difference in 15 games, making it one of the biggest surprises in the Romanian Superliga. He was honored as Manager of the Month for August 2024, an award bestowed by Gazeta Sporturilor. At the end of 2024, he won the "Manager of the Year" award.

In his first full season with the club, Dinamo had a record of thirteen wins, twelve draws and five losses in 30 games in the regular season, totalling 51 points, and qualified for the championship play-offs for the first time in eight years, finishing the season in the sixth place.

The 2025–26 season saw the team improve even further under Kopić's management, finishing the regular season with 52 points, qualifying for championship play-offs where they finished in fourth position which gave them the opportunity to play in the European competition play-offs final. Dinamo also reached the semifinals of Cupa României.

In terms of personal awards, during his time in Romania, Kopić has won several times the "Manager of the Month" award and twice the "Manager of the Year" award.

On 26 August 2026, Kopić was appointed manager of Polish top division newcomers Wieczysta Kraków, replacing Kazimierz Moskal. He was sacked by the club hours after a 2–1 away loss to Górnik Zabrze on 7 November. He left Wieczysta with a record of one win, two draws and eight losses.

== Managerial statistics ==
As of match played 7 November 2026

Managerial record by team and tenure
Team	Nat	From	To	Record							
Team	Nat	From	To	G	W	D	L	GF	GA	GD	Win %
Lučko	(Croatia)	23 August 2011	31 May 2012	24	5	12	7	24	29	−5	20.83
Cibalia	(Croatia)	30 July 2012	25 November 2012	15	4	3	8	14	24	−10	26.67
NK Zagreb	(Croatia)	6 June 2014	10 June 2015	37	13	7	17	53	63	−10	35.14
Slaven Belupo	(Croatia)	10 June 2015	24 October 2017	96	29	27	40	109	114	−5	30.21
Hajduk Split	(Croatia)	13 November 2017	6 September 2018	34	16	10	8	63	39	+24	47.06
Pafos	(Cyprus)	19 October 2018	6 November 2019	36	14	9	13	45	52	−7	38.89
Dinamo Zagreb	(Croatia)	2 December 2021	21 April 2022	19	13	2	4	27	10	+17	68.42
Botev Plovdiv	(Bulgaria)	3 August 2022	7 December 2022	15	6	1	8	25	19	+6	40.00
Dinamo București	(Romania)	1 December 2023	5 June 2026	115	43	40	32	144	121	+23	37.39
Wieczysta Kraków	(Poland)	26 August 2026	8 November 2026	11	1	2	8	11	21	−10	9.09
Career total				402	145	112	145	514	492	+22	36.07

== Honours ==
=== Manager ===
Hajduk Split

- Croatian Cup runner-up: 2017–18
