= Ivo Šušak =

Croatian football manager

Personal information
- Date of birth: 10 June 1948 (age 78)
- Place of birth: Široki Brijeg, Yugoslavia

Managerial career
- Years: Team
- 1988–1989: Dinamo Vinkovci
- 1989–1992: Zagreb
- 1992–1993: Belvedur Izola
- 1993–1995: Osijek
- 1995–1997: Hrvatski Dragovoljac
- 1997–2000: Croatia U21
- 2000–2001: Maribor
- 2002–2004: Dinamo Tbilisi
- 2003: Georgia
- 2005–2006: Osijek
- 2008–2009: Mika
- 2010: Zagreb
- 2011–2013: Croatia U21
- 2015: Osijek

Ivo Šušak (born 10 June 1948) is a Croatian football manager. He was the head coach of Dinamo Vinkovci, Zagreb, Osijek, Maribor, and Dinamo Tbilisi. He was also the head coach of Croatia under-21 team and the Georgian national team.

== Career ==
When managing Osijek in the 1994–1995 season, they qualified for the UEFA Cup for the first time in their history.

During the 2000–01 Slovenian PrvaLiga season he coached Maribor and won the league with the club, thus becoming the first foreign coach with the title of the Slovenian football champion. He has also won a Georgian championship and cup with Dinamo Tbilisi. He won the CIS Cup in Moscow with Dinamo Tbilisi in 2004. In May 2010, he replaced Igor Štimac as manager of NK Zagreb, his third spell at the club.

In February 2015, he was announced manager of Osijek for a third time as well.

== Honours ==
=== Manager ===
Zagreb

- Yugoslav Third League: 1989–90
- Yugoslav Second League: 1990–91

Maribor

- Slovenian PrvaLiga: 2000–01

Dinamo Tbilisi

- Georgian Premier League: 2002–03
- Georgian Cup: 2003–04
- Commonwealth of Independent States Cup: 2004
