= 2024 Croatian Football Cup final =

- Event: 2023–24 Croatian Cup
| Dinamo Zagreb | Rijeka |
| 3 | 1 |

First leg
| Dinamo Zagreb | Rijeka |
| 0 | 0 |
- Date: 15 May 2024
- Venue: Stadion Maksimir, Zagreb
- Referee: Dario Bel (Osijek)
- Attendance: 18,709

Second leg
| Rijeka | Dinamo Zagreb |
| 1 | 3 |
- Date: 22 May 2024
- Venue: Stadion Rujevica, Rijeka
- Referee: Jakov Titlić (Potravlje)
- Attendance: 8,127

The 2024 Croatian Cup Final was a two-legged affair played between Dinamo Zagreb and Rijeka. The first leg was played on 15 May 2024, and the second leg was played on 22 May 2024.

Dinamo Zagreb won the trophy with an aggregate result of 3–1. That was the first two-legged final since 2014.

== Road to the final ==
| Dinamo Zagreb | | Round | Rijeka | |
|---|---|---|---|---|
| Opponent | Result | | Opponent | Result |
| Bye | | Preliminary round | Bye | |
| Ponikve | 4–1 | First round | Libertas | 9–0 |
| Oriolik | 8–0 | Second round | Cibalia | 3–1 |
| Gorica | 4–0 | Quarter-finals | Rudeš | 1–0 |
| Hajduk Split | 1–0 | Semi-finals | Lokomotiva | 1–0 |

== First leg ==
15 May 2024
19:00

| Dinamo Zagreb | 0–0 | Rijeka |
|---|---|---|
| | Report |

Stadion Maksimir, Zagreb
Attendance: 18,709
Referee: Dario Bel (Osijek)

| Dinamo Zagreb | Rijeka |

| GK | 33 | (Croatia) Ivan Nevistić |
| RB | 18 | (France) Ronaël Pierre-Gabriel |
| CB | 22 | (North Macedonia) Stefan Ristovski |
| CB | 28 | (France) Kévin Théophile-Catherine |
| LB | 3 | (Japan) Takuya Ogiwara |
| CM | 25 | (Croatia) Petar Sučić | | (substituted off) 63' |
| CM | 27 | (Croatia) Josip Mišić |
| RW | 77 | (Croatia) Dario Špikić | | (substituted off) 57' |
| AM | 10 | (Croatia) Martin Baturina | | (substituted off) 90' |
| LW | 20 | (Kosovo) Arbër Hoxha | | (substituted off) 63' |
| CF | 9 | (Croatia) Bruno Petković (c) | | (substituted off) 90' |
Substitutes:
| GK | 32 | (Bosnia and Herzegovina) Faris Krkalić |
| DF | 15 | (Croatia) Moreno Živković |
| DF | 39 | (Croatia) Mauro Perković |
| MF | 5 | (North Macedonia) Arijan Ademi | | (substituted on) 63' |
| MF | 14 | (Croatia) Marko Rog | | (substituted on) 90' |
| MF | 30 | (Japan) Takuro Kaneko | | (substituted on) 57' |
| MF | 31 | (Croatia) Marko Bulat |
| MF | 77 | (Croatia) Gabriel Vidović | | (substituted on) 63' |
| FW | 17 | (Croatia) Sandro Kulenović | | (substituted on) 90' |
Manager:
| (Bosnia and Herzegovina) Sergej Jakirović | | | (yellow card) 84' |

| GK | 13 | (Bosnia and Herzegovina) Martin Zlomislić |
| RB | 28 | (Croatia) Ivan Smolčić |
| CB | 6 | (Croatia) Matej Mitrović (c) |
| CB | 26 | (Bosnia and Herzegovina) Stjepan Radeljić |
| LB | 3 | (Croatia) Bruno Goda | (yellow card) 67' |
| DM | 18 | (Albania) Lindon Selahi |
| RW | 87 | (Croatia) Marco Pašalić | | (substituted off) 77' |
| CM | 21 | (Croatia) Toni Fruk | | (substituted off) 77' |
| CM | 25 | (Croatia) Veldin Hodža |
| LW | 20 | (Croatia) Marko Pjaca | | (substituted off) 86' |
| CF | 89 | (Croatia) Franjo Ivanović | | (substituted off) 54' |
Substitutes:
| GK | 1 | (Croatia) Nediljko Labrović |
| DF | 66 | (Austria) Emir Dilaver |
| DF | 77 | (Portugal) Danilo Veiga | | (substituted on) 77' |
| MF | 4 | (Croatia) Niko Janković | | (substituted on) 77' |
| MF | 16 | (Slovenia) Dejan Petrovič | | (substituted on) 86' |
| MF | 23 | (Croatia) Alen Grgić |
| MF | 30 | (Croatia) Bruno Bogojević |
| FW | 9 | (Colombia) Jorge Obregón |
| FW | 24 | (Croatia) Mirko Marić | | (substituted on) 54' |
Manager:
(Croatia) Željko Sopić

Assistant referees:
Kristijan Novosel (Valpovo)
Kruno Šarić (Županja)
Fourth official:
Jakov Titlić (Potravlje)
Video assistant referee:
Duje Strukan (Split)
Assistant video assistant referee:
Bojan Zobenica (Velika Gorica)

Match rules

- 90 minutes.
- Nine named substitutes.
- Maximum of five substitutions.

== Second leg ==
22 May 2024
18:00

| Rijeka | 1–3 | Dinamo Zagreb |
|---|---|---|
| Fruk 90+2' | Report | Sučić 28'; Baturina 42'; Bulat 82' |

Stadion Rujevica, Rijeka
Attendance: 8,127
Referee: Jakov Titlić (Potravlje)

| Rijeka | Dinamo Zagreb |

| GK | 13 | (Bosnia and Herzegovina) Martin Zlomislić |
| RB | 28 | (Croatia) Ivan Smolčić |
| CB | 6 | (Croatia) Matej Mitrović (c) |
| CB | 26 | (Bosnia and Herzegovina) Stjepan Radeljić | (yellow card) 68' | (substituted off) 83' |
| LB | 3 | (Croatia) Bruno Goda | | (substituted off) 56' |
| DM | 18 | (Albania) Lindon Selahi | (yellow card) 76' | (substituted off) 72' |
| RW | 20 | (Croatia) Marko Pjaca | | (substituted off) 46' |
| CM | 21 | (Croatia) Toni Fruk |
| CM | 25 | (Croatia) Veldin Hodža |
| LW | 87 | (Croatia) Marco Pašalić |
| CF | 9 | (Colombia) Jorge Obregón | | (substituted off) 56' |
Substitutes:
| GK | 1 | (Croatia) Nediljko Labrović |
| DF | 5 | (Croatia) Niko Galešić | | (substituted on) 83' |
| DF | 32 | (Croatia) Marijan Čabraja | | (substituted on) 56' |
| MF | 4 | (Croatia) Niko Janković | | (substituted on) 46' |
| MF | 16 | (Slovenia) Dejan Petrovič |
| MF | 30 | (Croatia) Bruno Bogojević |
| FW | 24 | (Croatia) Mirko Marić | | (substituted on) 56' |
| FW | 89 | (Croatia) Franjo Ivanović | | (substituted on) 72' |
| FW | 99 | (Guinea) Momo Yansané |
Manager:
(Croatia) Željko Sopić

| GK | 33 | (Croatia) Ivan Nevistić |
| RB | 18 | (France) Ronaël Pierre-Gabriel |
| CB | 22 | (North Macedonia) Stefan Ristovski |
| CB | 28 | (France) Kévin Théophile-Catherine |
| LB | 3 | (Japan) Takuya Ogiwara | | (substituted off) 75' |
| CM | 5 | (North Macedonia) Arijan Ademi (c) | | (substituted off) 81' |
| CM | 25 | (Croatia) Petar Sučić | (yellow card) 20' | (substituted off) 46' |
| CM | 27 | (Croatia) Josip Mišić |
| RW | 10 | (Croatia) Martin Baturina | | (substituted off) 75' |
| CF | 9 | (Croatia) Bruno Petković | (yellow card) 68' | (substituted off) 86' |
| LW | 20 | (Kosovo) Arbër Hoxha |
Substitutes:
| GK | 32 | (Bosnia and Herzegovina) Faris Krkalić |
| DF | 6 | (France) Maxime Bernauer |
| DF | 39 | (Croatia) Mauro Perković | | (substituted on) 75' |
| MF | 14 | (Croatia) Marko Rog | | (substituted on) 46' |
| MF | 30 | (Japan) Takuro Kaneko |
| MF | 31 | (Croatia) Marko Bulat | (yellow card) 87' | (substituted on) 75' |
| MF | 72 | (Croatia) Gabriel Vidović | | (substituted on) 86' |
| FW | 17 | (Croatia) Sandro Kulenović | | (substituted on) 81' |
| FW | 19 | (Croatia) Fran Brodić |
Manager:
| (Bosnia and Herzegovina) Sergej Jakirović | | | (yellow card) 89' |

Assistant referees:
Hrvoje Radić (Split)
Goran Perica (Šibenik)
Fourth official:
Patrik Kolarić (Čakovec)
Video assistant referee:
Dario Bel (Osijek)
Assistant video assistant referee:
Marjan Tomas (Vladislavci)

Match rules

- 90 minutes.
- Penalty shoot-out if scores still level; no extra time.
- Nine named substitutes.
- Maximum of five substitutions.
