= 2023–24 in Croatian football =

Football in Croatia
- Season: 2023–24

Men's football
- HNL: Dinamo Zagreb
- 1. NL: Šibenik
- 2. NL: Opatija
- 3. NL: Polet (North); Uljanik (West); Segesta (Center); Slavonija Požega (East); Zadar (South)
- Croatian Cup: Dinamo Zagreb

Women's football
- Prva HNLŽ: Osijek
- Croatian Cup: Dinamo Zagreb

The following article presents a summary of the 2023–24 football season in Croatia, which is the 33rd season of competitive football in the country.

== National teams ==
=== Croatia ===
Date	Venue	Opponents	Score	Croatia scorer(s)	Report
UEFA Euro 2024 qualifying – Group stage
8 September 2023	Stadion Rujevica, Rijeka	Latvia	5–0	Petković (2), Ivanušec, Kramarić, Mario Pašalić	UEFA.com
11 September 2023	Republican Stadium, Yerevan	Armenia	1–0	Kramarić	UEFA.com
12 October 2023	Stadion Pampas, Osijek	Turkey	0–1		UEFA.com
15 October 2023	Cardiff City Stadium, Cardiff	Wales	1–2	Mario Pašalić	UEFA.com
18 November 2023	Skonto Stadium, Riga	Latvia	2–0	Majer, Kramarić	UEFA.com
21 November 2023	Stadion Maksimir, Zagreb	Armenia	1–0	Budimir	UEFA.com
2024 ACUD Cup
23 March 2024	Cairo International Stadium, Cairo	Tunisia	0–0; 5–4 (p)		FIFA.com
26 March 2024	New Administrative Capital Stadium, New Administrative Capital	Egypt	4–2	Vlašić, Petković, Kramarić, Majer	FIFA.com
Friendly fixtures
3 June 2024	Stadion Rujevica, Rijeka	North Macedonia	3–0	Majer (2), Marco Pašalić	hns.team
8 June 2024	Estádio Nacional, Oeiras	Portugal	2–1	Modrić, Budimir	hns.team

=== Croatia U21 ===
Date	Venue	Opponents	Score	Croatia scorer(s)	Report
2023 UEFA European Under-21 Championship – Group stage
21 June 2023	Stadionul Rapid-Giulești, Bucharest	Ukraine	0–2		UEFA.com
24 June 2023	Stadionul Rapid-Giulești, Bucharest	Spain	0–1		UEFA.com
27 June 2023	Stadionul Steaua, Bucharest	Romania	0–0		UEFA.com
2025 UEFA European Under-21 Championship qualification – Group stage
12 September 2023	Við Djúpumýrar, Klaksvík	Faroe Islands	4–2	Šimić, Hodža, Beljo, Ljubičić	UEFA.com
13 October 2023	Theodoros Kolokotronis Stadium, Tripoli	Greece	2–2	Hodža, Ljubičić	UEFA.com
17 October 2023	Stadion Radnik, Velika Gorica	Belarus	2–0	Sučić, Baturina	UEFA.com
20 November 2023	Armavir City Stadium, Armavir	Belarus	1–0	Ljubičić	UEFA.com
21 March 2024	Estadi Nacional, Andorra la Vella	Andorra	3–0	Izquierdo (o.g.), Ljubičić, Bukvić	UEFA.com
26 March 2024	Estádio de São Luís, Faro	Portugal	1–5	Ljubičić	UEFA.com
Friendly fixtures
16 November 2023	Štadión pod Zoborom, Nitra	Slovakia	2–2	Ljubičić, Ivanović	hns-cff.hr
7 June 2024	Gradski stadion Vrbovec, Vrbovec	Republic of Ireland	2–3	Matanović, Frigan	hns-cff.hr
11 June 2024	Stadion ŠRC Sesvete, Sesvete	Sweden	2–5	Škaričić, Frigan	hns-cff.hr

=== Croatia U19 ===
Date	Venue	Opponents	Score	Croatia scorer(s)	Report
2024 UEFA European Under-19 Championship qualification - Qualifying round
15 November 2023	Stadion Valbruna, Rovinj	Armenia	2–1	Vrbančić (2)	UEFA.com
18 November 2023	Stadion Valbruna, Rovinj	Faroe Islands	2–0	Košćević, Vrbančić	UEFA.com
21 November 2023	Stadion Valbruna, Rovinj	Israel	0–0		UEFA.com
2024 UEFA European Under-19 Championship qualification - Elite round
20 March 2024	Stadion Varteks, Varaždin	Germany	2–1	Pavić, Brajković	UEFA.com
23 March 2024	Stadion Varteks, Varaždin	Turkey	1–2	Košćević	UEFA.com
26 March 2024	Stadion Varteks, Varaždin	Romania	0–1		UEFA.com

=== Croatia U17 ===
Date	Venue	Opponents	Score	Croatia scorer(s)	Report
2024 UEFA European Under-17 Championship qualification - Qualifying round
3 November 2023	Stadion Branko Čavlović-Čavlek, Karlovac	Kosovo	4–0	Čović, Ćutuk, Zebić, Barić	UEFA.com
6 November 2023	Stadion Branko Čavlović-Čavlek, Karlovac	Faroe Islands	6–0	Matić (2), Durdov, Čović, Kostelac, Ahmeti	UEFA.com
9 November 2023	Stadion Branko Čavlović-Čavlek, Karlovac	England	1–5	Ćutuk	UEFA.com
2024 UEFA European Under-17 Championship qualification - Elite round
20 March 2024	Estádio Municipal Manuela Machado, Viana do Castelo	Germany	3–3	Ćutuk (2), Vojvodić	UEFA.com
23 March 2024	Estádio do FC Vizela, Vizela	Portugal	0–3		UEFA.com
26 March 2024	Estádio Municipal Manuela Machado, Viana do Castelo	Republic of Ireland	5–0	Ćutuk (2), Zebić, Marić, Puljić	UEFA.com
2024 UEFA European Under-17 Championship - Group stage
21 May 2024	Antonis Papadopoulos Stadium, Larnaca	Austria	0–0		UEFA.com
24 May 2024	Dasaki Stadium, Achna	Denmark	2–2	Čović, Mikić	UEFA.com
27 May 2024	Dasaki Stadium, Achna	Wales	1–1	Durdov	UEFA.com

=== Croatia Women's ===
Date	Venue	Opponents	Score	Croatia scorer(s)	Report
2023–24 UEFA Women's Nations League B - Group stage
22 September 2023	Stadion Varteks, Varaždin	Romania	2–1	Rudelić, Pezelj	UEFA.com
26 September 2023	NTC Senec, Senec	Slovakia	0–4		UEFA.com
27 October 2023	Bolt Arena, Helsinki	Finland	0–3		UEFA.com
31 October 2023	Stadion Šubićevac, Šibenik	Finland	0–2		UEFA.com
1 December 2023	Stadion Radnik, Velika Gorica	Slovakia	2–0	Krajinović, Dordić	UEFA.com
5 December 2023	Stadionul Arcul de Triumf, Bucharest	Romania	1–0	Rudelić	UEFA.com
2023–24 UEFA Women's Nations League B - Promotion play-offs
23 February 2024	Stadion Pampas, Osijek	Norway	0–3		UEFA.com
27 February 2024	Viking Stadion, Stavanger	Norway	0–5		UEFA.com
UEFA Women's Euro 2025 qualifying League B - Group stage
5 April 2024	Racecourse Ground, Wrexham	Wales	0–4		UEFA.com
9 April 2024	Ivan Laljak-Ivić Stadium, Zaprešić	Ukraine	1–0	Lojna	UEFA.com
31 May 2024	Zahir Pajaziti Stadium, Podujevo	Kosovo	1–0	Rudelić	UEFA.com
4 June 2024	Stadion Branko Čavlović-Čavlek, Karlovac	Kosovo	2–0	Rudelić, Marković	UEFA.com

=== Croatia Women's U19 ===
Date	Venue	Opponents	Score	Croatia scorer(s)	Report
2024 UEFA Women's Under-19 Championship qualification - Round 1
25 October 2023	Albena 1, Albena	Latvia	5–0	Augustāne (o.g.), Kolčić, Vunić, Petković, Klapan	UEFA.com
28 October 2023	Albena 1, Albena	Georgia	7–0	Živković (2), Vračević, Jojua (o.g.), Dubravica, Cindrić, Petković	UEFA.com
31 October 2023	Albena 1, Albena	Bulgaria	3–2	Dubravica, Kolčić, Živković	UEFA.com
2024 UEFA Women's Under-19 Championship qualification - Round 2
3 April 2024	Stadion Branko Čavlović-Čavlek, Karlovac	Austria	1–8	Dubravica	UEFA.com
6 April 2024	Stadion Branko Čavlović-Čavlek, Karlovac	Iceland	1–3	Dubravica	UEFA.com
9 April 2024	Stadion Branko Čavlović-Čavlek, Karlovac	Republic of Ireland	0–3		UEFA.com

=== Croatia Women's U17 ===
Date	Venue	Opponents	Score	Croatia scorer(s)	Report
2024 UEFA Women's Under-17 Championship qualification - Round 1
2 October 2023	Stadion Branko Čavlović-Čavlek, Karlovac	Malta	8–0	Veseli, Došen (2), Pestić (2), Lešić, Vanjak, Micallef (o.g.)	UEFA.com
5 October 2023	Stadion Branko Čavlović-Čavlek, Karlovac	Azerbaijan	8–0	Tomić (2), Maričić, Bandula (2), Pestić, Došen, Pešut	UEFA.com
8 October 2023	Stadion Branko Čavlović-Čavlek, Karlovac	Luxembourg	3–0	Grdiša, Oto, Došen	UEFA.com
2024 UEFA Women's Under-17 Championship qualification - Round 2
8 March 2024	Stadion Hrvatski vitezovi, Dugopolje	Austria	0–2		UEFA.com
11 March 2024	Stadion Poljud, Split	Hungary	1–0	Grdiša	UEFA.com
14 March 2024	Stadion Hrvatski vitezovi, Dugopolje	Belgium	0–1		UEFA.com

== League tables ==
=== Croatian Football League ===
Pos	Team	Pld	W	D	L	GF	GA	GD	Pts	Qualification or relegation
1	Dinamo Zagreb (C)	36	25	7	4	67	30	+37	82	Qualification to Champions League play-off round (Note: Since already qualified Real Madrid won the Champions League, Dinamo Zagreb was promoted to the Champions League play-off round as the champion with the highest coefficient in Champions League qualifying.)
2	Rijeka	36	23	5	8	69	30	+39	74	Qualification to Europa League second qualifying round (Note: The 2023–24 Croatian Football Cup winners qualified for the Europa League second qualifying round. Since the cup winners (Dinamo Zagreb) qualified for the Champions League, the Europa League spot was passed to the second-placed team, and the second Conference League second qualifying round spot was passed to the fourth-placed team.)
3	Hajduk Split	36	21	5	10	54	26	+28	68	Qualification to Conference League second qualifying round
4	Osijek	36	16	9	11	62	43	+19	57	Qualification to Conference League second qualifying round
5	Lokomotiva	36	12	15	9	52	45	+7	51	
6	Varaždin	36	10	12	14	39	47	−8	42	
7	Gorica	36	11	8	17	35	50	−15	41	
8	Istra 1961	36	10	11	15	36	54	−18	41	
9	Slaven Belupo	36	9	6	21	43	69	−26	33	
10	Rudeš (R)	36	1	6	29	22	85	−63	9	Relegation to First Football League

Source: SuperSport HNL
Rules for classification: 1) Points; 2) Head-to-head points; 3) Head-to-head goal difference; 4) Head-to-head goals scored (at home if two teams tied); 5) Goal difference; 6) Goals scored; 7) Play-off
(Note: Criteria 2-4 and 7 is only used if deciding champion, teams to international competition or teams for relegation and in that case criteria 6 will not be used).
(C) Champions; (R) Relegated

=== Croatian First Football League ===
Pos	Team	Pld	W	D	L	GF	GA	GD	Pts	Qualification or relegation
1	Šibenik (C, P)	33	26	4	3	68	18	+50	82	Promotion to the Croatian Football League
2	Zrinski Osječko 1664	33	26	3	4	53	18	+35	81	
3	Vukovar 1991	33	16	10	7	56	36	+20	58	
4	Sesvete	33	12	6	15	36	41	−5	42	
5	Jarun	33	11	7	15	35	46	−11	40	
6	Dubrava	33	10	8	15	36	44	−8	38	
7	Dugopolje	33	8	13	12	38	45	−7	37	
8	Cibalia	33	11	4	18	37	57	−20	37	
9	Croatia Zmijavci	33	8	12	13	39	48	−9	36	
10	BSK Bijelo Brdo	33	7	13	13	30	44	−14	34	
11	Orijent	33	7	12	14	34	48	−14	33	Relegation play-off
12	Solin (R)	33	4	12	17	33	50	−17	24	Relegation to the Second Football League

Updated to match(es) played on 8 June 2024. Source: Prva NL
Rules for classification: 1) Points; 2) Head-to-head points; 3) Head-to-head goal difference; 4) Head-to-head goals scored (at home if two teams tied); 5) Goal difference; 6) Goals scored; 7) Play-off
(Note: Criteria 2-4 and 7 is only used if deciding champion, teams for promotion or relegation and in that case criteria 6 will not be used).
(C) Champions; (P) Promoted; (R) Relegated

== Croatian clubs in Europe ==
=== Summary ===
Club	Competition	Starting round	Final round	Matches played
Dinamo Zagreb	Champions League	2nd qualifying round	3rd qualifying round	4
Dinamo Zagreb	Europa League	Play-off round		2
Dinamo Zagreb	Conference League	Group stage	Round of 16	10
Hajduk Split	Conference League	3rd qualifying round		2
Osijek	Conference League	2nd qualifying round	3rd qualifying round	4
Rijeka	Conference League	2nd qualifying round	Play-off round	6
ŽNK Osijek	Women's Champions League	1st qualifying round		2
Dinamo Zagreb U19	Youth League	First round	Second round	4

=== Dinamo Zagreb ===
Date	Venue	Opponents	Score	Dinamo Zagreb scorer(s)	Report
2023–24 Champions League - Second qualifying round
25 July 2023	Stadion Maksimir, Zagreb	(Kazakhstan) Astana	4–0	Špikić, Ivanušec (3)	UEFA.com
2 August 2023	Astana Arena, Astana	(Kazakhstan) Astana	2–0	Marochkin, Marin	UEFA.com
2023–24 Champions League - Third qualifying round
15 August 2023	Stadion Maksimir, Zagreb	(Greece) AEK Athens	1–2	Bulat	UEFA.com
19 August 2023	Agia Sophia Stadium, Athens	(Greece) AEK Athens	2–2	Šutalo, Ljubičić	UEFA.com
2023–24 Europa League - Play-off round
24 August 2023	Stadion Maksimir, Zagreb	(Czech Republic) Sparta Prague	3–1	Špikić, Perić, Ivanušec	UEFA.com
31 August 2023	Stadion Letná, Prague	(Czech Republic) Sparta Prague	1–4	Baturina	UEFA.com
2023–24 Conference League - Group stage
21 September 2023	Stadion Maksimir, Zagreb	(Kazakhstan) Astana	5–1	Petković (2), Bulat, Marin, Halilović	UEFA.com
5 October 2023	Fadil Vokrri Stadium, Pristina	(Kosovo) Ballkani	0–2		UEFA.com
26 October 2023	Stadion Maksimir, Zagreb	(Czech Republic) Viktoria Plzeň	0–1		UEFA.com
9 November 2023	Doosan Arena, Plzeň	(Czech Republic) Viktoria Plzeň	0–1		UEFA.com
30 November 2023	Astana Arena, Astana	(Kazakhstan) Astana	2–0	Vidović, Kaneko	UEFA.com
14 December 2023	Stadion Maksimir, Zagreb	(Kosovo) Ballkani	3–0	Perić, Petković (2)	UEFA.com
2023–24 Conference League - Knockout round play-offs
15 February 2024	Estadio Benito Villamarín, Seville	(Spain) Real Betis	1–0	Petković	UEFA.com
22 February 2024	Stadion Maksimir, Zagreb	(Spain) Real Betis	1–1	Kaneko	UEFA.com
2023–24 Conference League - Round of 16
7 March 2024	Stadion Maksimir, Zagreb	(Greece) PAOK	2–0	Petković (2)	UEFA.com
14 March 2024	Toumba Stadium, Thessaloniki	(Greece) PAOK	1–5	Hoxha	UEFA.com

=== Hajduk Split ===
Date	Venue	Opponents	Score	Hajduk Split scorer(s)	Report
2023–24 Conference League - Third qualifying round
10 August 2023	Stadion Poljud, Split	(Greece) PAOK	0–0		UEFA.com
17 August 2023	Toumba Stadium, Thessaloniki	(Greece) PAOK	0–3		UEFA.com

=== Osijek ===
Date	Venue	Opponents	Score	Osijek scorer(s)	Report
2023–24 Conference League - Second qualifying round
27 July 2023	Stadion Pampas, Osijek	(Hungary) Zalaegerszeg	1–0	Miérez	UEFA.com
3 August 2023	ZTE Arena, Zalaegerszeg	(Hungary) Zalaegerszeg	2–1	Gergényi (o.g.), Špoljarić	UEFA.com
2023–24 Conference League - Third qualifying round
10 August 2023	New Adana Stadium, Adana	(Turkey) Adana Demirspor	1–5	Gržan	UEFA.com
17 August 2023	Stadion Pampas, Osijek	(Turkey) Adana Demirspor	3–2	Nejašmić, Caktaš, Gržan	UEFA.com

=== Rijeka ===
Date	Venue	Opponents	Score	Rijeka scorer(s)	Report
2023–24 Conference League - Second qualifying round
27 July 2023	Fadil Vokrri Stadium, Pristina	(Kosovo) Dukagjini	1–0	Janković	UEFA.com
3 August 2023	Stadion Rujevica, Rijeka	(Kosovo) Dukagjini	6–1	Pašalić, Ivanović (3), Goda, Djouahra	UEFA.com
2023–24 Conference League - Third qualifying round
10 August 2023	Gundadalur, Tórshavn	(Faroe Islands) B36 Tórshavn	3–1	Janković, Goda, Radeljić	UEFA.com
17 August 2023	Stadion Rujevica, Rijeka	(Faroe Islands) B36 Tórshavn	2–0	Pašalić, Grgić	UEFA.com
2023–24 Conference League - Play-off round
24 August 2023	Stade Pierre-Mauroy, Villeneuve-d'Ascq	(France) Lille	1–2	Pašalić	UEFA.com
31 August 2023	Stadion Rujevica, Rijeka	(France) Lille	1–1 (a.e.t.)	Smolčić	UEFA.com

=== ŽNK Osijek ===
Date	Venue	Opponents	Score	ŽNK Osijek scorer(s)	Report
2023–24 UEFA Women's Champions League - First qualifying round
6 September 2023	Koševo City Stadium, Sarajevo	(Bosnia and Herzegovina) SFK 2000	4–0	Balić (2), Spahić (o.g.), Joščak	UEFA.com
9 September 2023	Koševo City Stadium, Sarajevo	(Ukraine) Vorskla Poltava	0–3		UEFA.com

=== Dinamo Zagreb U19 ===
Date	Venue	Opponents	Score	Dinamo Zagreb U19 scorer(s)	Report
2023–24 UEFA Youth League Domestic Champions Path - First round
4 October 2023	Stadion Kranjčevićeva, Zagreb	(Turkey) İstanbul Başakşehir	2–1	Graonić, Čaić	UEFA.com
25 October 2023	Esenler Stadium, Istanbul	(Turkey) İstanbul Başakşehir	3–1	Košćević (2), Miljak	UEFA.com
2023–24 UEFA Youth League Domestic Champions Path - Second round
8 November 2023	Leichtathletik-Stadion St. Jakob, Basel	(Switzerland) Basel	0–2		UEFA.com
29 November 2023	Stadion Maksimir, Zagreb	(Switzerland) Basel	0–0		UEFA.com
