= 2023–24 HNK Rijeka season =

Rijeka
2023–24 season
- President: Damir Mišković
- Head coach: Sergej Jakirović (until 21 August 2023); Željko Sopić (from 25 August 2023)
- Stadium: Rujevica
- HNL: 2nd
- Croatian Cup: Runners-up
- UEFA Europa Conference League: Play-off round
- Top goalscorer: League: Niko Janković (11); All: Niko Janković (14)
- Highest home attendance: 8,127 v. Dinamo Zagreb (22 May 2024)
- Lowest home attendance: 4,054 v. Rudeš (16 December 2023)
- Average home league attendance: 6,406
- Biggest win: 9–0 v Libertas (26 September 2023)
- Biggest defeat: 2–4 v Slaven Belupo (10 December 2023); 1–3 v Lokomotiva Zagreb (28 April 2024); 1–3 v Varaždin (11 May 2024); 0–2 v Osijek (19 May 2024); 1–3 v Dinamo Zagreb (22 May 2024)
Home colours	Away colours
- All statistics correct as of 24 May 2024.

The 2023–24 season was the 78th season in the existence of HNK Rijeka and the club's 33rd consecutive season in the top flight of Croatian football. In addition to the domestic league, Rijeka participated in this season's editions of the Croatian Cup and the UEFA Europa Conference League.

== Season overview ==
=== European campaign and change of coach ===
Rijeka opened their competitive season with a 4–0 home victory over Rudeš in the Croatian league. Their European campaign began in the second qualifying round of the 2023–24 UEFA Europa Conference League, where they defeated Dukagjini 1–0 away and 6–1 at Rujevica. Forward Franjo Ivanović scored a hat-trick in the second leg as Rijeka progressed 7–1 on aggregate. They subsequently defeated B36 Tórshavn in both legs of the third qualifying round, winning 3–1 in the Faroe Islands and 2–0 at home.

On 21 August, head coach Sergej Jakirović left Rijeka to become manager of Dinamo Zagreb, replacing Igor Bišćan. His departure came three days before Rijeka's Conference League play-off against Lille. Rijeka appointed Željko Sopić, who had begun the season as head coach of Gorica, as Jakirović's replacement.

Rijeka lost the first leg against Lille 2–1 in France despite taking the lead through Marco Pašalić. In the return match at Rujevica, Ivan Smolčić scored in the 58th minute to level the tie on aggregate and force extra time. Jonathan David equalised for Lille in the 109th minute, giving the French club a 3–2 aggregate victory and ending Rijeka's European campaign.

=== League and cup challenges ===
Under Sopić, Rijeka established themselves among the leading teams in the league. A 1–0 victory over Hajduk Split in October took Rijeka to the top of the table, while draws against Dinamo Zagreb and Osijek helped keep them in contention before the winter break. Their only league defeat between August and the end of 2023 was a 4–2 home loss to Slaven Belupo.

Rijeka began 2024 with five consecutive league victories, including a 2–1 comeback win against Hajduk at Poljud and a 4–0 home victory over Lokomotiva Zagreb. The run ended with a 1–0 defeat against Dinamo at Maksimir on 25 February, but Rijeka responded with seven successive league wins. That sequence included victories over Osijek, Hajduk and Istra 1961 and culminated in a 3–0 win against Gorica on 21 April, which preserved Rijeka's two-point advantage over Dinamo at the top of the table.

Rijeka also advanced through the Croatian Cup by defeating Libertas 9–0, Cibalia 3–1 and Rudeš 1–0. In the semi-final, Smolčić's second-half header secured a 1–0 away victory over Lokomotiva and a place in the two-legged final against Dinamo.

=== Runners-up in league and cup ===
Rijeka's title challenge was damaged by a 3–1 defeat away to Lokomotiva on 28 April, which ended their seven-match league winning run. In the following round, Rijeka hosted Dinamo in a direct contest for first place. Marko Pjaca gave Rijeka the lead from a penalty, but goals from Bruno Petković and Arbër Hoxha, the latter in the 89th minute, gave Dinamo a 2–1 victory and a four-point advantage with three matches remaining.

A 3–1 defeat against Varaždin on 11 May was Rijeka's third successive league loss. Dinamo's victory over Osijek later that day gave them an unassailable seven-point lead and confirmed Rijeka as league runners-up. Rijeka eventually finished the league season with 74 points from 23 victories, five draws and eight defeats, scoring 69 goals and conceding 30.

The first leg of the Croatian Cup final at Maksimir ended 0–0. In the return at Rujevica on 22 May, first-half goals from Petar Sučić and Martin Baturina put Dinamo in control before Marko Bulat added a third goal. Toni Fruk scored a late consolation as Rijeka lost 3–1, ending the season as runners-up in both the league and cup.

== Competitions ==
=== Overall ===
Competition	First match	Last match	Starting round	Final position	Record							
Competition	First match	Last match	Starting round	Final position	Pld	W	D	L	GF	GA	GD	Win %
SuperSport HNL	22 July 2023	26 May 2024	Matchday 1	2nd	36	23	5	8	69	30	+39	63.89
Croatian Cup	26 September 2023	22 May 2024	First round	Runners-up	6	4	1	1	15	4	+11	66.67
UEFA Europa Conference League	27 July 2023	31 August 2023	Second qualifying round	Play-off round	6	4	1	1	14	5	+9	66.67
Total					48	31	7	10	98	39	+59	64.58

Last updated: 27 May 2024
Source: Soccerway

=== SuperSport HNL ===
==== League table ====
Pos	Team	Pld	W	D	L	GF	GA	GD	Pts	Qualification or relegation
1	Dinamo Zagreb (C)	36	25	7	4	67	30	+37	82	Qualification to Champions League play-off round (Note: Since already qualified Real Madrid won the Champions League, Dinamo Zagreb was promoted to the Champions League play-off round as the champion with the highest coefficient in Champions League qualifying.)
2	Rijeka	36	23	5	8	69	30	+39	74	Qualification to Europa League second qualifying round (Note: The 2023–24 Croatian Football Cup winners qualified for the Europa League second qualifying round. Since the cup winners (Dinamo Zagreb) qualified for the Champions League, the Europa League spot was passed to the second-placed team, and the second Conference League second qualifying round spot was passed to the fourth-placed team.)
3	Hajduk Split	36	21	5	10	54	26	+28	68	Qualification to Conference League second qualifying round
4	Osijek	36	16	9	11	62	43	+19	57	Qualification to Conference League second qualifying round
5	Lokomotiva	36	12	15	9	52	45	+7	51	

Source: SuperSport HNL
Rules for classification: 1) Points; 2) Head-to-head points; 3) Head-to-head goal difference; 4) Head-to-head goals scored (at home if two teams tied); 5) Goal difference; 6) Goals scored; 7) Play-off
(Note: Criteria 2-4 and 7 is only used if deciding champion, teams to international competition or teams for relegation and in that case criteria 6 will not be used).
(C) Champions

==== Results summary ====
Overall								Home						Away					
Pld	W	D	L	GF	GA	GD	Pts	W	D	L	GF	GA	GD	W	D	L	GF	GA	GD
36	23	5	8	69	30	+39	74	14	2	2	46	12	+34	9	3	6	23	18	+5

Last updated: 27 May 2024.
Source: SuperSport HNL

==== Results by round ====
Round	1	2	3	4	5	6	7	8	9	10	11	12	13	14	15	16	17	18	19	20	21	22	23	24	25	26	27	28	29	30	31	32	33	34	35	36
Ground	H	A	H	A	H	A	H	H	A	A	H	A	H	A	H	A	A	H	H	A	H	A	H	A	H	H	A	A	H	A	H	A	H	A	A	H
Result	W	L	W	W	W	L	D	W	W	W	W	D	W	D	D	W	D	L	W	W	W	W	W	L	W	W	W	W	W	W	W	L	L	L	L	W
Position	2	4	2	2	2	2	2	2	2	2	1	1	1	1	2	2	2	3	2	1	1	1	1	1	1	1	1	1	1	1	1	2	2	2	2	2

Updated to match(es) played on 26 May 2024. Source: SuperSport HNL
A = Away; H = Home; W = Win; D = Draw; L = Loss

=== Results by opponent ===
Team	Results				Points
Team	1	2	3	4	Points
Dinamo Zagreb	1–2	2–2	0–1	1–2	1
Gorica	3–2	1–0	2–0	3–0	12
Hajduk Split	0–1	1–0	2–1	1–0	9
Istra 1961	6–0	1–1	3–0	2–0	10
Lokomotiva	2–1	1–1	4–0	1–3	7
Osijek	2–1	0–0	3–0	0–2	7
Rudeš	4–0	2–1	3–0	3–0	12
Slaven Belupo	1–0	2–4	1–0	4–0	9
Varaždin	2–2	2–0	2–0	1–3	7

Source: 2023–24 Croatian Football League article

== Matches ==
=== SuperSport HNL ===
22 July 2023 1	Rijeka	4–0	Rudeš	Rijeka
18:45 CEST (UTC+02:00)	Janković 40' (pen.) 68'; Goda (yellow card) 43' (goal) 89'; Fruk 81'	Report	Matić (yellow card) 4'	Stadium: Rujevica; Attendance: 5,070; Referee: Mateo Erceg (Benkovac)

30 July 2023 2	Hajduk Split	1–0	Rijeka	Split
21:05 CEST (UTC+02:00)	Pukštas 50'; Livaja (yellow card) 54'	Report	Hodža (yellow card) 30'; Lepinjica (yellow card) 61'; Selahi (yellow card) 64'; Djouahra (yellow card) 84'	Stadium: Poljud; Attendance: 32,584; Referee: Patrik Kolarić (Čakovec)

6 August 2023 3	Rijeka	6–0	Istra 1961	Rijeka
21:00 CEST (UTC+02:00)	Ivanović 34'; Selahi 44'; Pašalić 45+1'; Goda 59'; Smolčić (yellow card) 60'; Majstorović 61' (o.g.); Grgić 81'	Report	Nebyla (yellow card) 45+1'; Ćalušić (yellow card) 46'; Petrusenko (yellow card) 46'	Stadium: Rujevica; Attendance: 4,856; Referee: Dario Bel (Osijek)

20 August 2023 5	Rijeka	2–1	Lokomotiva	Rijeka
21:05 CEST (UTC+02:00)	Pašalić 39'; Radeljić (yellow card) 40'; Lepinjica (yellow card) 57'; Djouahra 78'	Report	Bubanja 6'; Marić (yellow card) 28'; Mersinaj (yellow card) 68'; Goričan (yellow card) 80'	Stadium: Rujevica; Attendance: 5,441; Referee: Dario Bel (Osijek)

27 August 2023 6	Dinamo Zagreb	2–1	Rijeka	Zagreb
21:05 CEST (UTC+02:00)	Bulat 38'; Ristovski (yellow card) 60'; Petković 85' (pen.); Šutalo (yellow card) 89'	Report	Janković (yellow card) 32'; Hodža (yellow card) 59'; Pašalić (yellow card) 63' (goal) 89'	Stadium: Maksimir; Attendance: 9,305; Referee: Patrik Kolarić (Čakovec)

3 September 2023 7	Rijeka	2–2	Varaždin	Rijeka
18:30 CEST (UTC+02:00)	Janković 17' (yellow card) 77'; Hodža (yellow card) 21'; Mitrović (yellow card) 69'; Obregón 85'	Report	Postonjski 70' (pen.); Brodić 74'; Pëllumbi (red card) 83'; Zelenika (yellow card) 90+5'	Stadium: Rujevica; Attendance: 5,925; Referee: Ante Čulina (Zagreb)

16 September 2023 8	Rijeka	2–1	Osijek	Rijeka
19:30 CEST (UTC+02:00)	Selahi (yellow card) 45+1'; Pjaca 47' 55'	Report	Manev (yellow card) 31'; Pušić (yellow card) 45+1' (goal) 85'; Harmash (yellow card) 67'; Lovrić (yellow card) 69'; Živković (yellow card) 90+5'	Stadium: Rujevica; Attendance: 6,373; Referee: Patrik Kolarić (Čakovec)

24 September 2023 9	Slaven Belupo	0–1	Rijeka	Koprivnica
17:00 CEST (UTC+02:00)	Božić (yellow card) 23'; Racic (yellow card) 87'	Report	Galešić 40' (yellow card) 56'; Labrović (yellow card) 88'; Fruk (yellow card) 90+2'	Stadium: Gradski; Attendance: 853; Referee: Duje Strukan (Split)

1 October 2023 10	Rudeš	1–2	Rijeka	Zagreb
15:15 CEST (UTC+02:00)	Latković (yellow card) 14'; Srbljinović (yellow card) 20'; Pešić (yellow card) 36'; Topić 90'	Report	Janković 12'; Smolčić (yellow card) 34'; Ivanović 79'; Goda (yellow card) 81'	Stadium: Kranjčevićeva; Attendance: 842; Referee: Dario Bel (Osijek)

7 October 2023 11	Rijeka	1–0	Hajduk Split	Rijeka
18:30 CEST (UTC+02:00)	Janković 63' (pen.)	Report	Odjidja-Ofoe (yellow card) 81'	Stadium: Rujevica; Attendance: 8,071; Referee: Patrik Kolarić (Čakovec)

22 October 2023 12	Istra 1961	1–1	Rijeka	Pula
15:00 CEST (UTC+02:00)	Hujber (yellow card) 20'; Marešić (yellow card) 38'; Mlinar 49' (yellow card) 90'; Douglas (yellow card) 90+6'	Report	Janković 21'; Fruk (yellow card) 74'	Stadium: Aldo Drosina; Attendance: 3,665; Referee: Ante Čulina (Zagreb)

29 October 2023 13	Rijeka	1–0	Gorica	Rijeka
15:00 CET (UTC+01:00)	Pašalić 7' (yellow card) 59'; Selahi (yellow card) 90+3'	Report	Mrzljak (yellow card) 59'; Munksgaard (yellow card) 62'	Stadium: Rujevica; Attendance: 5,776; Referee: Duje Strukan (Split)

3 November 2023 14	Lokomotiva	1–1	Rijeka	Zagreb
18:00 CET (UTC+01:00)	Tuci 27'; Mersinaj (yellow card) 53'; Marić (yellow card) 57'; Leovac (yellow card) 60'	Report	Hodža (yellow card) 29'; Fruk 43'	Stadium: Kranjčevićeva; Attendance: 1,054; Referee: Patrik Kolarić (Čakovec)

12 November 2023 15	Rijeka	2–2	Dinamo Zagreb	Rijeka
19:00 CET (UTC+01:00)	Pašalić (yellow card) 44'; Ivanović (yellow card) 45+3'; Selahi 52'; Mitrović 89'	Report	Špikić 40'; Kulenović (yellow card) 44'; Mišić (yellow card) 44'; Ristovski (yellow card) 45+3'; Théophile-Catherine (yellow card) 77'; Perić 81'; Ademi (yellow card) 84'; Marin (yellow card) 88'	Stadium: Rujevica; Attendance: 8,108; Referee: Dario Bel (Osijek)

25 November 2023 16	Varaždin	0–2	Rijeka	Varaždin
15:00 CET (UTC+01:00)	Jelenić (yellow card) 31'; Postonjski (yellow card) 34'	Report	Banda 13' (yellow card) 48'; Čabraja (yellow card) 42'; Škaričić 53' (o.g.); Goda (yellow card) 76'; Grgić (yellow card) 90+1'	Stadium: Varteks; Attendance: 1,818; Referee: Fran Jović (Zagreb)

2 December 2023 17	Osijek	0–0	Rijeka	Osijek
15:00 CET (UTC+01:00)	Bralić (yellow card) 29'; Miérez (yellow card) 87'	Report	Smolčić (yellow card) 27'; Pašalić (yellow card) 64'; Janković (yellow card) 68'; Dilaver (yellow card) 90+3'; Obregón (yellow card) 90+5'	Stadium: Opus Arena; Attendance: 7,425; Referee: Mateo Erceg (Benkovac)

10 December 2023 18	Rijeka	2–4	Slaven Belupo	Rijeka
17:10 CET (UTC+01:00)	Ivanović 79'; Obregón 89'; Dilaver (yellow card) 90+1'	Report	Sušak (yellow card) 37'; Štrkalj 45+2'; Pllana (yellow card) 51'; Mioč 70'; Lepinjica (yellow card) 75'; Caimacov 77'; Agbekpornu (yellow card) 80'; Hoxha 85'; Šakota (yellow card) 90+1'	Stadium: Rujevica; Attendance: 5,119; Referee: Duje Strukan (Split)

16 December 2023 19	Rijeka	3–0	Rudeš	Rijeka
17:00 CET (UTC+01:00)	Ivanović 15' 63'; Bogojević (yellow card) 37'; Pjaca 74'	Report	Srbljinović (yellow card) 33'; Pasariček (yellow card) 60'	Stadium: Rujevica; Attendance: 4,054; Referee: Mateo Erceg (Benkovac)

24 January 2024 4	Gorica	2–3	Rijeka	Velika Gorica
17:00 CET (UTC+01:00)	J. Mitrović 3' (yellow card) 7'; Raspopović (yellow card) 18'; Smolčić 26' (o.g.); Jurić (yellow card) 45+2'; Mrzljak (red card) 90+5'; Blummel (yellow card) 90+5'	Report	Hodža (yellow card) 30'; Pjaca 35' (pen.) (penalty missed) 53' 53'; Galešić 89'; Goda (yellow card) 90+5'	Stadium: Radnik; Attendance: 1,213; Referee: Mateo Erceg (Benkovac)

28 January 2024 20	Hajduk Split	1–2	Rijeka	Split
17:45 CET (UTC+01:00)	Pukštas 15'; Sahiti (yellow card) 37'; Sigur (yellow card) 51'; Uremović (yellow card) 76'; Žaper (yellow card) 87'; Kalik (yellow card) 90+7'; N. Kalinić (yellow card) 90+7'	Report	Smolčić (yellow card) 4'; Radeljić (yellow card) 32'; Selahi (yellow card) 47' (goal) 75'; Obregón 55'; Labrović (yellow card) 90+7'	Stadium: Poljud; Attendance: 32,621; Referee: Patrik Kolarić (Čakovec)

4 February 2024 21	Rijeka	3–0	Istra 1961	Rijeka
15:00 CET (UTC+01:00)	Hodža 10'; Bogojević (yellow card) 17'; Janković 34' (pen.); Selahi (yellow card) 40'; Marić 74'	Report	Majkić (yellow card) 23'; Erceg (yellow card) 23'; Maurić (red card) 45'	Stadium: Rujevica; Attendance: 7,558; Referee: Ante Čulina (Zagreb)

11 February 2024 22	Gorica	0–2	Rijeka	Velika Gorica
17:10 CET (UTC+01:00)	Leš (yellow card) 26'; Soldo (yellow card) 30'; Jurić (yellow card) 45' (penalty missed) 52'; Lazarov (yellow card) 90+5'	Report	Veiga (yellow card) 42'; Pjaca (penalty missed) 45+5'; Obregón 66' (pen.) 75' (pen.) (yellow card) 76'	Stadium: Radnik; Attendance: 1,015; Referee: Duje Strukan (Split)

17 February 2024 23	Rijeka	4–0	Lokomotiva	Rijeka
15:00 CET (UTC+01:00)	Bogojević 10' 31'; Galešić (yellow card) 27'; Smolčić (yellow card) 71'; Hodža 85'; Grgić 90+2'	Report	Čop (yellow card) 48'; Ma. Marić (yellow card) 54'; Canjuga (yellow card) 81'	Stadium: Rujevica; Attendance: 7,693; Referee: Igor Pajač (Sv. Ivan Zelina)

25 February 2024 24	Dinamo Zagreb	1–0	Rijeka	Zagreb
15:00 CET (UTC+01:00)	Brodić 90+4' (pen.)	Report	Fruk (yellow card) 18'; Ivanović (yellow card) 34'; Pjaca (yellow card) 77'; Goda (yellow card) 90+3'	Stadium: Maksimir; Attendance: 17,269; Referee: Dario Bel (Osijek)

3 March 2024 25	Rijeka	2–0	Varaždin	Rijeka
15:00 CET (UTC+01:00)	Smolčić (yellow card) 63'; Banda (yellow card) 77'; Galešić 80'; Mitrović 90'	Report	Boršić (yellow card) 5'; Dabro (yellow card) 28'	Stadium: Rujevica; Attendance: 6,855; Referee: Ante Čulina (Zagreb)

10 March 2024 26	Rijeka	3–0	Osijek	Rijeka
15:00 CET (UTC+01:00)	Hodža 21' 23' 63'; Veiga (yellow card) 59'	Report	Çokaj (yellow card) 36'; Pušić (yellow card) 54'	Stadium: Rujevica; Attendance: 6,718; Referee: Duje Strukan (Split)

16 March 2024 27	Slaven Belupo	0–1	Rijeka	Koprivnica
15:00 CET (UTC+01:00)	Agbekpornu (yellow card) 58'; Lepinjica (yellow card) 60'; Štefulj (yellow card) 64'; Bosec (yellow card) 68'; Štrkalj (yellow card) 88'	Report	Galešić 50'; Obregón (yellow card) 89'; Radeljić (yellow card) 90+5'	Stadium: Gradski; Attendance: 1,811; Referee: Zdenko Lovrić (Đakovo)

30 March 2024 28	Rudeš	0–3	Rijeka	Zagreb
17:00 CET (UTC+01:00)	Latković (yellow card) 81'	Report	Pašalić 10'; Marić 53'; Selahi 56'	Stadium: Kranjčevićeva; Attendance: 1,158; Referee: Tihomir Pejin (Donji Miholjac)

7 April 2024 29	Rijeka	1–0	Hajduk Split	Rijeka
19:30 CEST (UTC+02:00)	Radeljić (yellow card) 57'; Pašalić 70'	Report	Kalik (yellow card) 40'	Stadium: Rujevica; Attendance: 8,091; Referee: Horațiu Feșnic (Romania)

14 April 2024 30	Istra 1961	0–2	Rijeka	Pula
19:00 CEST (UTC+02:00)	Blagojević (yellow card) 50'; Majkić (yellow card) 90+5'	Report	Fruk 30'; Selahi (yellow card) 35'; Pjaca (yellow card) 52'; Goda 84'	Stadium: Aldo Drosina; Attendance: 5,228; Referee: Dario Bel (Osijek)

21 April 2024 31	Rijeka	3–0	Gorica	Rijeka
19:30 CEST (UTC+02:00)	Fruk (yellow card) 35'; Pjaca 68'; Petrovič (yellow card) 78'; Marić 80'; Goda 89'; Smolčić (yellow card) 90+3'	Report	Pršir (yellow card) 28'; J. Mitrović (yellow card) 61'; Kapulica (yellow card) 79'	Stadium: Rujevica; Attendance: 7,103; Referee: Mateo Erceg (Benkovac)

28 April 2024 32	Lokomotiva	3–1	Rijeka	Zagreb
19:30 CEST (UTC+02:00)	Bubanja (yellow card) 21'; Mudražija (yellow card) 34' (goal) 37'; Šotiček 43' 90+6'	Report	Radeljić (yellow card) 36'; Obregón 67'; Smolčić (yellow card) 69'; Janković (yellow card) 71'	Stadium: Kranjčevićeva; Attendance: 3,141; Referee: Patrik Kolarić (Čakovec)

5 May 2024 33	Rijeka	1–2	Dinamo Zagreb	Rijeka
19:30 CEST (UTC+02:00)	Selahi (yellow card) 23'; Goda (yellow card) 34'; Pjaca 50' (pen.); Hodža (yellow card) 64'; Radeljić (yellow card) 74'	Report	Kulenović (yellow card) 26'; Petković 75'; Hoxha 89' (yellow card) 89'; Théophile-Catherine (yellow card) 90+4'	Stadium: Rujevica; Attendance: 8,118; Referee: Tamás Bognár (Hungary)

11 May 2024 34	Varaždin	3–1	Rijeka	Varaždin
17:00 CEST (UTC+02:00)	Drožđek 16' 59'; Šego 30'; Vukčević (yellow card) 81' (yellow-red card) 86'; Škaričić (yellow card) 90+2'	Report	Janković 45'; Selahi (yellow card) 48'; Galešić (yellow card) 52'	Stadium: Varteks; Attendance: 2,654; Referee: Duje Strukan (Split)

19 May 2024 35	Osijek	2–0	Rijeka	Osijek
19:30 CEST (UTC+02:00)	Jurišić 5'; Omerović (yellow card) 57'; Matković 72'; Bralić (yellow card) 81'; Prekodravac (yellow card) 81'	Report	Čabraja (yellow card) 21'; Banda (yellow card) 68'; Fruk (yellow card) 83'; Smolčić (yellow card) 84'; Dilaver (yellow card) 84'	Stadium: Opus Arena; Attendance: 10,112; Referee: Duje Strukan (Split)

26 May 2024 36	Rijeka	4–0	Slaven Belupo	Rijeka
15:00 CEST (UTC+02:00)	Obregón 18'; Janković 45+1' 62' (yellow card) 89' (goal) 90+2'	Report		Stadium: Rujevica; Attendance: 4,351; Referee: Toni Dadić (Zagreb)

=== Croatian Cup ===
26 September 2023 R1	Libertas	0–9	Rijeka	Novska
15:30 CEST (UTC+02:00)	Verić (yellow card) 13'	Report	Yansané 4' 31'; Hodža 14'; Ivanović 18' 58'; Grgić 49'; Veiga (yellow card) 57' (goal) 90'; Bogojević 67'; Janković 84'	Stadium: Gradski stadion Attendance: 1,000; Referee: Zdenko Lovrić (Đakovo)

5 December 2023 R2	Cibalia	1–3	Rijeka	Vinkovci
13:30 CET (UTC+01:00)	Bosak (yellow card) 26'; Pejić (yellow card) 41'; Belančić (yellow card) 56'; Miljanić 76'	Report	Ivanović 33' 73'; Grgić 84'	Stadium: HNK Cibalia; Attendance: 880; Referee: Mario Zebec (Cestica)

28 February 2024 QF	Rudeš	0–1	Rijeka	Zagreb
14:00 CET (UTC+01:00)	Latković (yellow card) 54'; Šehić (yellow card) 73'	Report	Galešić 79'	Stadium: ŠC Rudeš; Attendance: 485; Referee: Duje Strukan (Split)

3 April 2024 SF	Lokomotiva	0–1	Rijeka	Zagreb
16:00 CEST (UTC+02:00)	Mudražija (yellow card) 70'; Šotiček (yellow card) 88'	Report	Galešić (yellow card) 29'; Bogojević (yellow card) 57'; Selahi (yellow card) 70'; Smolčić 70'; Petrovič (yellow card) 90+4'	Stadium: Kranjčevićeva; Attendance: 1,878; Referee: Patrik Kolarić (Čakovec)

15 May 2024 Final	Dinamo Zagreb	0–0	Rijeka	Zagreb
19:00 CEST (UTC+02:00)		Report	Goda (yellow card) 67'	Stadium: Maksimir; Attendance: 18,709; Referee: Dario Bel (Osijek)

22 May 2024 Final	Rijeka	1–3 (1–3 agg.)	Dinamo Zagreb	Rijeka
18:00 CEST (UTC+02:00)	Radeljić (yellow card) 68'; Selahi (yellow card) 76'; Fruk 90+1'	Report	Sučić (yellow card) 20' (goal) 28'; Baturina 42'; Petković (yellow card) 68'; Bulat 82' (yellow card) 87'	Stadium: Rujevica; Attendance: 8,127; Referee: Jakov Titlić (Hrvace)

=== UEFA Europa Conference League ===
27 July 2023 QR2	Dukagjini (Kosovo)	0–1	(Croatia) Rijeka	Pristina, Kosovo
20:00 CEST (UTC+02:00)	Mërlaku (yellow card) 23' (yellow-red card) 62'; Basriu (yellow card) 50'; Morina (yellow card) 86'	Report	Janković 30'; Banda (yellow card) 71'; Goda (yellow card) 73'	Stadium: Fadil Vokrri Stadium; Attendance: 2,000; Referee: Jasmin Sabotic (Luxembourg)

3 August 2023 QR2	Rijeka (Croatia)	6–1 (7–1 agg.)	(Kosovo) Dukagjini	Rijeka, Croatia
20:15 CEST (UTC+02:00)	Pašalić 27'; Ivanović 39' 45+3' 90+2'; Goda 64'; Djouahra 81'	Report	Zylfiu 42'; Haxhihamza (yellow card) 64'; Kameraj (yellow card) 78'	Stadium: Rujevica; Attendance: 6,827; Referee: Jamie Robinson (Northern Ireland)

10 August 2023 QR3	B36 Tórshavn (Faroe Islands)	1–3	(Croatia) Rijeka	Tórshavn, Faroe Islands
19:00 WEST (UTC+01:00)	Agnarsson 33'; Egilsson (yellow card) 77'; B. Nielsen (yellow card) 86'; Przybylski (yellow card) 90'	Report	Janković 41' (pen.); Goda 48'; Selahi (yellow card) 58'; Radeljić 88'	Stadium: Tórsvøllur; Attendance: 1,161; Referee: Mohammed Al-Emara (Finland)

17 August 2023 QR3	Rijeka (Croatia)	2–0 (5–1 agg.)	(Faroe Islands) B36 Tórshavn	Rijeka, Croatia
20:15 CEST (UTC+02:00)	Pašalić 14'; Veiga (yellow card) 30'; Grgić 82'	Report	Nattestad (yellow card) 10'	Stadium: Rujevica; Attendance: 6,934; Referee: Oleksii Derevinskyi (Ukraine)

24 August 2023 PO	Lille (France)	2–1	(Croatia) Rijeka	Villeneuve-d'Ascq, France
20:00 CEST (UTC+02:00)	André (yellow card) 15'; Zhegrova 43' (yellow card) 52'; Yoro 89'	Report	Pašalić 24'; Mitrović (yellow card) 51'; Labrović (yellow card) 81'	Stadium: Stade Pierre-Mauroy; Attendance: 22,189; Referee: Atilla Karaoğlan (Turkey)

31 August 2023 PO	Rijeka (Croatia)	1–1 (a.e.t.) (2–3 agg.)	(France) Lille	Rijeka, Croatia
20:15 CEST (UTC+02:00)	Fruk (yellow card) 37'; Galešić (yellow card) 45+1'; Ivanović (yellow card) 49'; Smolčić 58' (yellow card) 120+1'; Vukčević (yellow card) 111'; Obregón (yellow card) 114'	Report	David (yellow card) 8' (goal) 109'; Diakité (yellow card) 99'	Stadium: Rujevica; Attendance: 7,852; Referee: Luís Godinho (Portugal)

=== Friendlies ===
==== Pre-season ====
21 June 2023 Friendly	Rijeka	2–1	HUNS	Rijeka
19:00 CEST (UTC+02:00)	Obregón 6'; Pašalić 46'	Report	Kreković 27'	Stadium: Rujevica (training ground); Attendance: Behind closed doors Referee: Ivan Šantić (Kastav)

24 June 2023 Friendly	Rijeka (Croatia)	3–1	(Slovakia) Spartak Trnava	Rijeka, Croatia
18:30 CEST (UTC+02:00)	Djouahra 4'; Ampem 6'; Ivanović 21'	Report	Ikugar 52'	Stadium: Rujevica; Attendance: Behind closed doors Referee: Marin Rožman (Rijeka)

28 June 2023 Friendly	Rijeka (Croatia)	0–1	(Slovenia) Domžale	Kranjska Gora, Slovenia
17:30 CEST (UTC+02:00)		Report	Hasanbegović 85'	Stadium: SRC Ruteč; Attendance: Behind closed doors Referee: Andrej Žnidaršič (Kranj)

1 July 2023 Friendly	Rijeka (Croatia)	3–0	(Slovenia) Bravo	Kranjska Gora, Slovenia
17:30 CEST (UTC+02:00)	Obregón 39'; Ivanović 51' (pen.); Ampem 65' (pen.)	Report		Stadium: SRC Ruteč; Attendance: Behind closed doors Referee: Andrej Žnidaršič (Kranj)

4 July 2023 Friendly	Rijeka (Croatia)	0–0	(Serbia) Čukarički	Kranjska Gora, Slovenia
17:30 CEST (UTC+02:00)		Report		Stadium: SRC Ruteč; Attendance: Behind closed doors Referee: Anže Jerič (Kranj)

7 July 2023 Friendly	Rijeka (Croatia)	3–0	(Slovenia) Koper	Kranjska Gora, Slovenia
15:00 CEST (UTC+02:00)	Djouahra 43'; Lepinjica 55'; Hodža 60'	Report	Osuji (yellow card)	Stadium: SRC Ruteč; Attendance: Behind closed doors Referee: Anže Jerič (Kranj)

14 July 2023 Friendly	Rijeka	2–1	Slaven Belupo	Rijeka
19:00 CEST (UTC+02:00)	Janković (yellow card) 12'; Ampem 32' (pen.); Banda 35'; Grgić (penalty missed) 72'; Fruk (yellow card)	Report	Hlevnjak (yellow card) 34'; Mioč 39'	Stadium: Rujevica; Attendance: 2,300; Referee: Ivan Šantić (Kastav)

15 July 2023 Friendly	Rijeka (Croatia)	4–0	(Slovenia) Rogaška	Rijeka, Croatia
19:00 CEST (UTC+02:00)	Selahi 11'; Ivanović 62' (pen.); Pašalić 66' (pen.); Fruk 75'	Report		Stadium: Rujevica; Attendance: 500; Referee: Marin Rožman (Rijeka)

==== On-season (2023) ====
9 September 2023 Friendly	Domžale (Slovenia)	0–4	(Croatia) Rijeka	Domžale, Slovenia
17:00 CEST (UTC+02:00)		Report	Galešić 25'; Janković 31'; Obregón 49'; Bogojević 88'	Stadium: Domžale Sports Park; Attendance: Behind closed doors

14 October 2023 Friendly	Rijeka (Croatia)	1–1	(Italy) Udinese	Rijeka, Croatia
17:00 CEST (UTC+02:00)	Pašalić 36'; Janković (yellow card) 89'	Report	Zarraga 26'; Quina (yellow card) 39'; Kabasele (yellow card) 40'; Pérez (yellow card) 54' (yellow-red card) 89'; Pereyra (yellow card) 67'	Stadium: Rujevica; Attendance: 2,889; Referee: Marin Rožman (Rijeka)

18 November 2023 Friendly	Rijeka (Croatia)	1–1	(Italy) Triestina	Rijeka, Croatia
14:30 CET (UTC+01:00)	Čabraja 49' (yellow card)	Report	Adorante 24'; Fofana (yellow card); Malomo (yellow card); Lescano (yellow card) (yellow-red card) 90'	Stadium: Rujevica; Attendance: 977; Referee: Marin Rožman (Rijeka)

==== Mid-season ====
9 January 2024 Friendly	Radomlje (Slovenia)	0–2 (Note: The first half lasted 60 minutes, the second half lasted 45 minutes.)	(Croatia) Rijeka	Čatež ob Savi, Slovenia
13:30 CET (UTC+01:00)	Gorenc Stankovič (yellow card) 80'	Report	Grgić (yellow card) 60'; Yansané 73'; Galešić 89'	Stadium: Terme Čatež football field

12 January 2024 Friendly	Sturm Graz (Austria)	2–1 (Note: The game was played in 4 quarters of 30 minutes.)	(Croatia) Rijeka	Čatež ob Savi, Slovenia
13:30 CET (UTC+01:00)	Sarkaria 39'; Camara 49'; Stückler (yellow card) 80'	Report	Fruk 6'; Goda (yellow card) 40'; Petrovič (yellow card) 90+9'	Stadium: Terme Čatež football field Attendance: 50; Referee: Denis Halilović (Celje)

17 January 2024 Friendly	Rijeka (Croatia)	0–0	(Slovenia) Bravo	Rijeka, Croatia
17:00 CET (UTC+01:00)		Report		Stadium: Rujevica; Attendance: 300; Referee: Ivan Šantić (Kastav)

18 January 2024 Friendly	Rijeka	1–1	Opatija	Rijeka
11:00 CET (UTC+01:00)	Grgić 38'	Report	V. Bogolin 56'	Stadium: Rujevica (training ground); Attendance: Behind closed doors Referee: Marin Rožman (Rijeka)

==== On-season (2024) ====
18 February 2024 Friendly	Rijeka	4–0	Opatija	Rijeka
	Marić; Veiga; Yansané	Report		Stadium: Rujevica (training ground); Attendance: Behind closed doors

22 March 2024 Friendly	Rijeka (Croatia)	6–0	(Slovenia) Domžale	Rijeka, Croatia
16:00 CET (UTC+01:00)	Janković 15' (penalty missed) 40'; Obregón 43'; Ivanović 45+1' 57' (pen.); Galešić 73'; Marić 78'; Bogojević (yellow card)	Report	Nwankwo (yellow card)	Stadium: Rujevica; Attendance: Behind closed doors Referee: Marin Rožman (Rijeka)

17 April 2024 Friendly	Draga	0–9	Rijeka	Mošćenička Draga
17:00 CEST (UTC+02:00)		Report	Obregón 19'; Bogojević 32'; Petrovič 43'; Yansané 49'; Banda 56'; Bilajac 65'; Jakac 75' 88'; Medojević 86'	Stadium: Slatina; Attendance: 700; Referee: Vladimir Merle (Viškovo)

22 April 2024 Friendly	Rijeka	2–0	Opatija	Rijeka
11:00 CEST (UTC+02:00)	Čabraja 45'; Graf 60' (o.g.)	Report		Stadium: Rujevica (training ground); Attendance: Behind closed doors Referee: Marin Rožman (Rijeka)

29 April 2024 Friendly	Rijeka	3–0	Opatija	Rijeka
	Marić 8'; Janković 11'; Bilajac 70'	Report		Stadium: Rujevica; Attendance: Behind closed doors Referee: Marin Rožman (Rijeka)

== Player seasonal records ==
Updated 27 May 2024. Competitive matches only.

=== Goals ===
Rank	Name	League	Europe	Cup	Total
1	(Croatia) Niko Janković	11	2	1	14
2	(Croatia) Franjo Ivanović	5	3	4	12
3	(Croatia) Marco Pašalić	6	3	–	9
4	(Colombia) Jorge Obregón	7	–	–	7
4	(Croatia) Marko Pjaca	7	–	–	7
6	(Croatia) Veldin Hodža	5	–	1	6
6	(Croatia) Bruno Goda	4	2	–	6
8	(Croatia) Niko Galešić	4	–	1	5
8	(Croatia) Alen Grgić	2	1	2	5
10	(Albania) Lindon Selahi	4	–	–	4
10	(Croatia) Toni Fruk	3	–	1	4
12	(Croatia) Mirko Marić	3	–	–	3
12	(Croatia) Bruno Bogojević	2	–	1	3
14	(Croatia) Matej Mitrović	2	–	–	2
14	(France) Naïs Djouahra	1	1	–	2
14	(Croatia) Ivan Smolčić	–	1	1	2
14	(Guinea) Momo Yansané	–	–	2	2
18	(Zambia) Emmanuel Banda	1	–	–	1
18	(Bosnia and Herzegovina) Stjepan Radeljić	–	1	–	1
18	(Portugal) Danilo Veiga	–	–	1	1
Own goals		2	–	–	2
TOTALS		65	14	15	94

Source: Competitive matches

=== Clean sheets ===
Rank	Name	League	Europe	Cup	Total
1	(Croatia) Nediljko Labrović	18	2	–	20
2	(Bosnia and Herzegovina) Martin Zlomislić	1	–	4	5
TOTALS		19	2	4	25

Source: Competitive matches

=== Disciplinary record ===
Number	Position	Player	HNL			Europe			Croatian Cup			Total		
Number	Position	Player	Yellow card	(yellow card) (yellow-red card)	Red card	Yellow card	(yellow card) (yellow-red card)	Red card	Yellow card	(yellow card) (yellow-red card)	Red card	Yellow card	(yellow card) (yellow-red card)	Red card
1	GK	(Croatia) Nediljko Labrović	2	0	0	1	0	0	0	0	0	3	0	0
3	DF	(Croatia) Bruno Goda	6	0	0	1	0	0	1	0	0	8	0	0
4	MF	(Croatia) Niko Janković	5	0	0	0	0	0	0	0	0	5	0	0
5	DF	(Croatia) Niko Galešić	3	0	0	1	0	0	1	0	0	5	0	0
6	DF	(Croatia) Matej Mitrović	1	0	0	1	0	0	0	0	0	2	0	0
9	FW	(Colombia) Jorge Obregón	3	0	0	1	0	0	0	0	0	4	0	0
12	MF	(Zambia) Emmanuel Banda	3	0	0	1	0	0	0	0	0	4	0	0
12	MF	(Croatia) Ivan Lepinjica	2	0	0	0	0	0	0	0	0	2	0	0
12	DF	(Montenegro) Andrija Vukčević	0	0	0	1	0	0	0	0	0	1	0	0
16	MF	(Slovenia) Dejan Petrovič	1	0	0	0	0	0	1	0	0	2	0	0
18	MF	(Albania) Lindon Selahi	8	0	0	1	0	0	2	0	0	11	0	0
20	MF	(Croatia) Marko Pjaca	2	0	0	0	0	0	0	0	0	2	0	0
21	MF	(Croatia) Toni Fruk	5	0	0	1	0	0	0	0	0	6	0	0
23	MF	(Croatia) Alen Grgić	1	0	0	0	0	0	0	0	0	1	0	0
25	MF	(Croatia) Veldin Hodža	6	0	0	0	0	0	0	0	0	6	0	0
26	DF	(Bosnia and Herzegovina) Stjepan Radeljić	6	0	0	0	0	0	1	0	0	7	0	0
28	DF	(Croatia) Ivan Smolčić	9	0	0	1	0	0	0	0	0	10	0	0
30	MF	(Croatia) Bruno Bogojević	2	0	0	0	0	0	1	0	0	3	0	0
32	DF	(Croatia) Marijan Čabraja	2	0	0	0	0	0	0	0	0	2	0	0
66	DF	(Austria) Emir Dilaver	3	0	0	0	0	0	0	0	0	3	0	0
77	DF	(Portugal) Danilo Veiga	2	0	0	1	0	0	1	0	0	4	0	0
87	MF	(Croatia) Marco Pašalić	4	0	0	0	0	0	0	0	0	4	0	0
89	FW	(Croatia) Franjo Ivanović	2	0	0	1	0	0	0	0	0	3	0	0
99	MF	(France) Naïs Djouahra	1	0	0	0	0	0	0	0	0	1	0	0
TOTALS			79	0	0	12	0	0	8	0	0	99	0	0

Source: nk-rijeka.hr

=== Appearances and goals ===
Number	Position	Player	Apps	Goals	Apps	Goals	Apps	Goals	Apps	Goals
Number	Position	Player	Total		HNL (Note: First number represents appearances in starting eleven, while the second number indicates a substitute appearance.)		Conference League		Croatian Cup	
1	GK	(Croatia) Nediljko Labrović	41	0	35+0	0	6+0	0	0+0	0
2	DF	(Croatia) Lovro Kitin	2	0	0+2	0	0+0	0	0+0	0
3	DF	(Croatia) Bruno Goda	35	6	23+3	4	5+0	2	3+1	0
4	MF	(Croatia) Niko Janković	42	14	26+5	11	6+0	2	1+4	1
5	DF	(Croatia) Niko Galešić	35	5	22+5	4	3+1	0	3+1	1
6	DF	(Croatia) Matej Mitrović	31	2	19+7	2	1+2	0	2+0	0
7	MF	(United States) Steven Juncaj	2	0	0+0	0	0+0	0	0+2	0
8	MF	(Croatia) Adrian Liber	6	0	0+2	0	0+4	0	0+0	0
9	FW	(Colombia) Jorge Obregón	37	7	8+23	7	1+2	0	1+2	0
12	MF	(Zambia) Emmanuel Banda	28	1	7+15	1	2+0	0	2+2	0
12	MF	(Croatia) Ivan Lepinjica	5	0	1+1	0	0+3	0	0+0	0
12	DF	(Montenegro) Andrija Vukčević	4	0	0+1	0	2+1	0	0+0	0
13	GK	(Bosnia and Herzegovina) Martin Zlomislić	7	0	1+0	0	0+0	0	6+0	0
15	DF	(Croatia) Roko Valinčić	2	0	0+1	0	0+0	0	0+1	0
16	MF	(Slovenia) Dejan Petrovič	24	0	4+16	0	0+0	0	2+2	0
17	FW	(Croatia) Jakov Bilajac	1	0	0+1	0	0+0	0	0+0	0
18	MF	(Albania) Lindon Selahi	39	4	29+1	4	5+1	0	3+0	0
19	MF	(Croatia) Matej Momčilovski	1	0	0+0	0	0+0	0	0+1	0
20	MF	(Croatia) Marko Pjaca	31	7	23+4	7	0+0	0	3+1	0
21	MF	(Croatia) Toni Fruk	43	4	30+3	3	5+1	0	4+0	1
22	MF	(Croatia) Noel Jakac	1	0	0+1	0	0+0	0	0+0	0
23	MF	(Croatia) Alen Grgić	29	5	4+17	2	1+4	1	3+0	2
24	FW	(Croatia) Mirko Marić	19	3	8+7	3	0+0	0	2+2	0
25	MF	(Croatia) Veldin Hodža	44	6	22+10	5	5+1	0	5+1	1
26	DF	(Bosnia and Herzegovina) Stjepan Radeljić	36	1	16+9	0	5+0	1	5+1	0
27	DF	(Croatia) Šimun Butić	1	0	0+1	0	0+0	0	0+0	0
27	MF	(Bosnia and Herzegovina) Silvio Ilinković	12	0	0+5	0	0+5	0	2+0	0
28	DF	(Croatia) Ivan Smolčić	36	2	28+2	0	2+0	1	4+0	1
30	MF	(Croatia) Bruno Bogojević	19	3	8+6	2	0+1	0	3+1	1
32	DF	(Croatia) Marijan Čabraja	10	0	7+2	0	0+0	0	0+1	0
66	DF	(Austria) Emir Dilaver	22	0	16+1	0	3+0	0	2+0	0
77	DF	(Portugal) Danilo Veiga	19	1	6+5	0	4+0	0	2+2	1
87	MF	(Croatia) Marco Pašalić	41	9	26+4	6	5+1	3	3+2	0
89	FW	(Croatia) Franjo Ivanović	41	12	21+9	5	5+1	3	4+1	4
99	MF	(France) Naïs Djouahra	8	2	1+4	1	0+3	1	0+0	0
99	FW	(Guinea) Momo Yansané	11	2	5+4	0	0+0	0	1+1	2

Source: nk-rijeka.hr

=== Suspensions ===
Date Incurred	Competition	Player	Games Missed	Reason
3 Sep 2023	HNL	(Croatia) Veldin Hodža	1	Yellow card
29 Oct 2023	HNL	(Albania) Lindon Selahi	1	Yellow card
12 Nov 2023	HNL	(Croatia) Marco Pašalić	1	Yellow card
25 Nov 2023	HNL	(Croatia) Bruno Goda	1	Yellow card
2 Dec 2023	HNL	(Croatia) Niko Janković	1	Yellow card
2 Dec 2023	HNL	(Croatia) Ivan Smolčić	1	Yellow card
25 Feb 2024	HNL	(Croatia) Toni Fruk	1	Yellow card
3 Mar 2024	HNL	(Croatia) Ivan Smolčić	1	Yellow card
16 Mar 2024	HNL	(Colombia) Jorge Obregón	1	Yellow card
16 Mar 2024	HNL	(Bosnia and Herzegovina) Stjepan Radeljić	1	Yellow card
14 Apr 2024	HNL	(Albania) Lindon Selahi	1	Yellow card
5 May 2024	HNL	(Croatia) Bruno Goda	1	Yellow card
5 May 2024	HNL	(Croatia) Veldin Hodža	1	Yellow card
5 May 2024	HNL	(Bosnia and Herzegovina) Stjepan Radeljić	1	Yellow card
11 May 2024	HNL	(Croatia) Niko Galešić	1	Yellow card
19 May 2024	HNL	(Zambia) Emmanuel Banda	1	Yellow card
19 May 2024	HNL	(Austria) Emir Dilaver	1	Yellow card
19 May 2024	HNL	(Croatia) Ivan Smolčić	1	Yellow card

=== Penalties ===
For
Date	Competition	Player	Opposition	Scored?
22 Jul 2023	HNL	(Croatia) Niko Janković	Rudeš	✓
10 Aug 2023	UECL	(Croatia) Niko Janković	B36 Tórshavn	✓
7 Oct 2023	HNL	(Croatia) Niko Janković	Hajduk Split	✓
24 Jan 2023	HNL	(Croatia) Marko Pjaca	Gorica	✓
24 Jan 2023	HNL	(Croatia) Marko Pjaca	Gorica	✗
4 Feb 2024	HNL	(Croatia) Niko Janković	Istra 1961	✓
11 Feb 2024	HNL	(Croatia) Marko Pjaca	Gorica	✗
11 Feb 2024	HNL	(Colombia) Jorge Obregón	Gorica	✓
11 Feb 2024	HNL	(Colombia) Jorge Obregón	Gorica	✓
5 May 2024	HNL	(Croatia) Marko Pjaca	Dinamo Zagreb	✓
Against
Date	Competition	Goalkeeper	Opposition	Scored?
27 Aug 2023	HNL	(Croatia) Nediljko Labrović	Dinamo Zagreb	✓
3 Sep 2023	HNL	(Croatia) Nediljko Labrović	Varaždin	✓
11 Feb 2024	HNL	(Croatia) Nediljko Labrović	Gorica	✗
25 Feb 2024	HNL	(Croatia) Nediljko Labrović	Dinamo Zagreb	✓

== Transfers ==
=== In ===
Date	Pos.	Player	Moving from	Type	Fee	Ref.
4 Jun 2023	CM	(Slovenia) Dejan Petrovič	(Austria) Rapid Wien	Transfer	Free	
8 Jun 2023	CM	(Bosnia and Herzegovina) Silvio Ilinković	(Bosnia and Herzegovina) Zrinjski Mostar	Transfer	Free	
14 Jun 2023	LB	(Croatia) Marijan Čabraja	(Scotland) Hibernian	Transfer	Free	
15 Jun 2023	CB	(Croatia) Tino Agić	(Slovenia) Gorica	Return from loan	—N/a	
15 Jun 2023	CB	(Croatia) Mateo Pavlović	(France) Saint-Étienne	Return from loan	—N/a	
15 Jun 2023	DM	(Croatia) Marino Kukoč	(Croatia) Kustošija	Return from loan	—N/a	
15 Jun 2023	DM	(Croatia) Ivan Lepinjica	(Germany) Arminia Bielefeld	Return from loan	—N/a	
15 Jun 2023	CM	(Bosnia and Herzegovina) Mario Vrančić	(Bosnia and Herzegovina) Sarajevo	Return from loan	—N/a	
15 Jun 2023	LM	(Italy) Gabriel Lunetta	(Italy) Südtirol	Return from loan	—N/a	
15 Jun 2023	LW	(Croatia) Denis Bušnja	(Slovenia) Bravo	Return from loan	—N/a	
15 Jun 2023	LW	(Albania) Bernard Karrica	(Slovenia) Gorica	Return from loan	—N/a	
20 Jun 2023	CF	(Croatia) Franjo Ivanović	(Germany) Augsburg II	Transfer	Free	
22 Jun 2023	RW	(Croatia) Marco Pašalić	(Germany) Borussia Dortmund II	Transfer	Free	
26 Jun 2023	AM	(Croatia) Niko Janković	(Croatia) Dinamo Zagreb	Transfer	Free	
12 Jul 2023	AM	(Croatia) Toni Fruk	(Italy) Fiorentina	Transfer	Free	
13 Jul 2023	CB	(Bosnia and Herzegovina) Stjepan Radeljić	(Moldova) Sheriff Tiraspol	Transfer	€200,000	
10 Aug 2023	LM	(United States) Steven Juncaj	(Slovenia) Gorica	Transfer	Free	
1 Sep 2023	LW	(Croatia) Marko Pjaca	(Italy) Juventus	Transfer	Free	
9 Sep 2023	CF	(Guinea) Momo Yansané	(Moldova) Sheriff Tiraspol	Transfer	Free	
31 Dec 2023	DM	(Serbia) Damjan Pavlović	(Sweden) Degerfors IF	Return from loan	—N/a	
18 Jan 2024	CB	(Croatia) Tino Agić	(Croatia) Orijent	Return from loan	—N/a	
18 Jan 2024	CB	(Croatia) Mateo Pavlović	(Croatia) Rudeš	Return from loan	—N/a	
31 Jan 2024	CF	(Croatia) Mirko Marić	(Italy) Monza	Loan (until 30/6/2024)	—N/a	

Source: Glasilo Hrvatskog nogometnog saveza

=== Out ===
Date	Pos.	Player	Moving to	Type	Fee	Ref.
4 Jun 2023	DM	(Bosnia and Herzegovina) Mato Stanić	(Bosnia and Herzegovina) Zrinjski Mostar	Released (mutual consent)	Free	
15 Jun 2023	AM	(Croatia) Niko Janković	(Croatia) Dinamo Zagreb	End of loan	—N/a	
15 Jun 2023	LW	(Croatia) Antonio Marin	(Croatia) Dinamo Zagreb	End of loan	—N/a	
15 Jun 2023	CF	(Australia) Deni Jurić	(Croatia) Dinamo Zagreb	End of loan	—N/a	
21 Jun 2023	AM	(Spain) Pablo Álvarez	(Bulgaria) Cherno More	Released (mutual consent)	Free	
28 Jun 2023	RB	(Croatia) Filip Braut	(Slovenia) Rogaška	Released (mutual consent)	Free	
29 Jun 2023	DM	(Croatia) Andro Babić	(Bosnia and Herzegovina) Posušje	Loan (until 19/6/2024)	—N/a	
1 Jul 2023	LM	(Italy) Gabriel Lunetta	(Italy) Südtirol	Transfer (buying option)	Undisclosed	
4 Jul 2023	CM	(Bosnia and Herzegovina) Mario Vrančić	(Bosnia and Herzegovina) Sarajevo	Released (mutual consent)	Free	
4 Jul 2023	LW	(Croatia) Dominik Simčić	(Croatia) Orijent	Dual registration	—N/a	
6 Jul 2023	CF	(Austria) Marco Djuricin	(Slovakia) Spartak Trnava	Loan (until 19/6/2024; option to buy)	—N/a	
13 Jul 2023	GK	(Croatia) Mislav Zadro	(Croatia) Orijent	Dual registration	—N/a	
13 Jul 2023	CF	(Croatia) Niko Gajzler	(Croatia) Orijent	Dual registration	—N/a	
16 Jul 2023	CB	(Croatia) Duje Dujmović	(Croatia) Šibenik	Loan (until 19/6/2024)	—N/a	
19 Jul 2023	CB	(Croatia) Anton Krešić	(Romania) CFR Cluj	Loan (until 30/6/2024; option to buy)	—N/a	
19 Jul 2023	RW	(Ghana) Prince Ampem	(Turkey) Eyüpspor	Transfer	€1,500,000	
24 Jul 2023	CF	(Croatia) Matija Frigan	(Belgium) Westerlo	Transfer	€5,500,000	
1 Aug 2023	DM	(Croatia) Marino Kukoč	(Croatia) Kustošija	Released (mutual consent)	Free	
4 Aug 2023	LB	(Croatia) Noel Bodetić	(Croatia) Orijent	Dual registration	—N/a	
4 Aug 2023	DM	(Croatia) Antonio Galešić	(Croatia) Grobničan	Dual registration	—N/a	
4 Aug 2023	AM	(Croatia) Karlo Valjan	(Croatia) Orijent	Dual registration	—N/a	
22 Aug 2023	GK	(Croatia) Mislav Zadro	(Cyprus) Aris Limassol	Transfer	Undisclosed	
31 Aug 2023	LW	(France) Naïs Djouahra	(Spain) Leganés	Loan (until 19/6/2024; option to buy)	—N/a	
5 Sep 2023	LW	(Albania) Bernard Karrica	(Kosovo) Ballkani	Released (mutual consent)	Free	
6 Sep 2023	LB	(Russia) Mikhail Merkulov	—N/a	Retirement	—N/a	
7 Sep 2023	DM	(Croatia) Ivan Lepinjica	(Croatia) Slaven Belupo	Released (mutual consent)	Free	
7 Sep 2023	CM	(Croatia) Adrian Liber	(Croatia) Slaven Belupo	Released (mutual consent)	Free	
8 Sep 2023	CB	(Croatia) Tino Agić	(Croatia) Orijent	Loan (until 18/1/2024)	—N/a	
8 Sep 2023	CB	(Croatia) Mateo Pavlović	(Croatia) Rudeš	Loan (until 18/1/2024)	—N/a	
8 Sep 2023	LW	(Croatia) Denis Bušnja	(Georgia (country)) Dinamo Tbilisi	Released (mutual consent)	Free	
14 Sep 2023	LB	(Montenegro) Andrija Vukčević	(Mexico) Juárez	Transfer	€1,000,000	
22 Jan 2024	CB	(Croatia) Mateo Pavlović	(Croatia) Rudeš	Loan (until 19/6/2024)	—N/a	
2 Feb 2024	CM	(Bosnia and Herzegovina) Silvio Ilinković	(Bosnia and Herzegovina) Zrinjski Mostar	Loan (until 18/6/2024)	—N/a	
9 Feb 2024	GK	(Serbia) Aleksa Todorović	(Croatia) Orijent	Dual registration	—N/a	
9 Feb 2024	CB	(Croatia) Tino Agić	(Croatia) Orijent	Dual registration	—N/a	
9 Feb 2024	DM	(Croatia) Antonio Galešić	(Croatia) Orijent	Dual registration	—N/a	
15 Feb 2024	CB	(Croatia) Tino Agić	(Croatia) Cibalia	Loan (until 20/6/2024)	—N/a	
19 Feb 2024	CM	(Montenegro) Strahinja Tešović	(Croatia) Grobničan	Dual registration	—N/a	
28 Feb 2024	CB	(Niger) Djibrilla Ibrahim	TBC	Released (mutual consent)	Free	
14 Mar 2024	LM	(United States) Steven Juncaj	(United States) Michigan Stars FC	Loan (until 30/6/2024)	—N/a	

Source: Glasilo Hrvatskog nogometnog saveza

Spending: ▼€200,000
Income: ▲€8,000,000
Expenditure: ▲€7,800,000
