= Mirko Marić =

Footballer (born 1995)

Personal information
- Date of birth: 16 May 1995 (age 31)
- Place of birth: Split, Croatia
- Height: 1.88 m (6 ft 2 in)
- Position: Forward

Team information
- Current team: Lokomotiva

Youth career
- HNK Grude
- 2009–2012: Široki Brijeg

Senior career*
Years	Team	Apps	(Gls)
2012–2014	Široki Brijeg	39	(10)
2014–2017	Dinamo Zagreb	0	(0)
2014–2017	→ Lokomotiva (loan)	73	(17)
2017	Videoton	16	(2)
2017–2020	Osijek	97	(45)
2020–2026	Monza	52	(4)
2021–2022	→ Crotone (loan)	36	(11)
2024	→ Rijeka (loan)	15	(3)
2025	→ Venezia (loan)	10	(0)
2026–	Lokomotiva		

International career
2011	Bosnia and Herzegovina U17	4	(0)
2012–2013	Bosnia and Herzegovina U18	4	(0)
2013–2014	Bosnia and Herzegovina U19	10	(2)
2015–2016	Croatia U21	6	(2)
2017	Croatia	2	(0)
- * Club domestic league appearances and goals as of 22 July 2026

Mirko Marić (Croatian pronunciation: [mǐːrko mǎːritɕ]; born 16 May 1995) is a professional footballer who plays as a forward for the Croatian Football League club NK Lokomotiva. Born in Bosnia and Herzegovina, Marić played for the Croatia national team.

== Club career ==
=== NK Široki Brijeg ===
Marić started his professional career at Široki Brijeg.

=== Dinamo Zagreb ===
Marić signed a seven-year contract with Croatian giants Dinamo Zagreb on 27 March 2014. He spent the rest of the season at Široki Brijeg, and then moved to Dinamo Zagreb in the summer.

=== NK Široki Brijeg ===
Upon his arrival at Dinamo Zagreb in the summer of 2014, Marić was immediately loaned back to Široki Brijeg. He played six games for Široki Brijeg, including four in the Europa League qualifying phase. He scored two goals for Široki Brijeg in the second leg against Gabala in the first qualifying round. On 13 August 2014, Dinamo Zagreb withdrew their loan agreement with Široki Brijeg.

=== Lokomotiva ===
On 18 August 2014, Marić was loaned to NK Lokomotiva. He made his Prva HNL debut against Rijeka on 24 August 2014. Marić scored 28 goals in 94 games in all competitions.

=== Osijek ===
Marić joined Osijek in September 2017. In his second season, he became the league's second-best top scorer with 18 goals. By January 2020, in the following league season, Marić scored 14 goals in 19 matches. Good performances attracted various clubs; however, Osijek rejected a €5 million bid from Dynamo Kyiv. He finished the season with 20 goals as the league's joint-top goalscorer, and left the club with 53 goals in 113 games in all competitions.

=== Monza ===
On 11 August 2020, Marić moved to newly promoted Serie B side Monza, signing a five-year contract. He scored his first goal on 21 November, in a 1–1 draw to Pordenone in the league.

==== Loan to Crotone ====
On 17 August 2021, Marić moved to fellow-Serie B club Crotone on a one-year loan, with an option for purchase.

==== Loan to Rijeka ====
On 31 January 2024, Marić was loaned to Rijeka in Croatia until the end of the season.

==== Loan to Venezia ====
On 3 February 2025, Marić was loaned to Serie A team Venezia until the end of the season.

=== Return to Lokomotiva ===
On July 22 2026 it was announced that Mirko Marić has returned to NK Lokomotiva after 9 years, having signed a two-year contract.

== International career ==
Eligible to play for either Croatia or Bosnia and Herzegovina, Marić had stated that he wished to play for Croatia. He was called up for Croatia for the 2017 China Cup and played in two games.

== Personal life ==
His younger brother, Mateo is also a professional footballer , playing as a defensive midfielder for Omonia in the Cypriot First Division.

== Career statistics ==
=== Club ===
As of match played 25 May 2025

Appearances and goals by club, season and competition
Club	Season	League			Cup		Europe		Total	
Club	Season	Division	Apps	Goals	Apps	Goals	Apps	Goals	Apps	Goals
Široki Brijeg	2012–13	Bosnian Premier League	15	2	4	1	—		22	3
Široki Brijeg	2013–14	Bosnian Premier League	22	8	3	2	3	0	29	12
Široki Brijeg	2014–15	Bosnian Premier League	2	0	0	0	4	2	2	0
Široki Brijeg	Total		39	10	7	3	7	2	53	15
Lokomotiva (loan)	2014–15	Prva HNL	24	6	4	0	—		28	6
Lokomotiva (loan)	2015–16	Prva HNL	31	8	3	3	4	1	38	12
Lokomotiva (loan)	2016–17	Prva HNL	18	3	2	1	8	6	28	10
Lokomotiva (loan)	Total		73	17	9	4	12	7	94	28
Videoton	2016–17	NB I	12	2	0	0	—		12	2
Videoton	2017–18	NB I	4	0	0	0	6	0	8	0
Videoton	Total		16	2	0	0	4	0	20	2
Osijek	2017–18	Prva HNL	26	7	3	4	—		29	11
Osijek	2018–19	Prva HNL	36	18	4	1	4	1	44	20
Osijek	2019–20	Prva HNL	35	20	3	2	2	0	40	22
Osijek	Total		97	45	10	7	6	1	113	53
Monza	2020–21	Serie B	21	2	2	0	—		23	2
Monza	2023–24	Serie A	10	1	0	0	—		10	1
Monza	2024–25	Serie A	8	0	3	0	—		11	0
Monza	2025–26	Serie B	13	1	0	0	—		13	1
Monza	Total		52	4	5	0	0	0	57	4
Crotone (loan)	2021–22	Serie B	36	11	1	0	—		37	11
Rijeka (loan)	2023–24	Prva HNL	15	3	4	0	—		19	3
Venezia (loan)	2024–25	Serie A	10	0	0	0	—		10	0
Career total			338	92	36	14	29	10	403	116

=== International ===
As of game played on 14 January 2017

Appearances and goals by national team and year
National team	Year	Apps	Goals
Croatia	2017	2	0
Total		2	0

== Honours ==
Široki Brijeg

- Bosnia and Herzegovina Football Cup: 2012–13

Videoton

- Nemzeti Bajnokság I: 2017–18
