= Matej Mitrović =

Croatian footballer (born 1993)

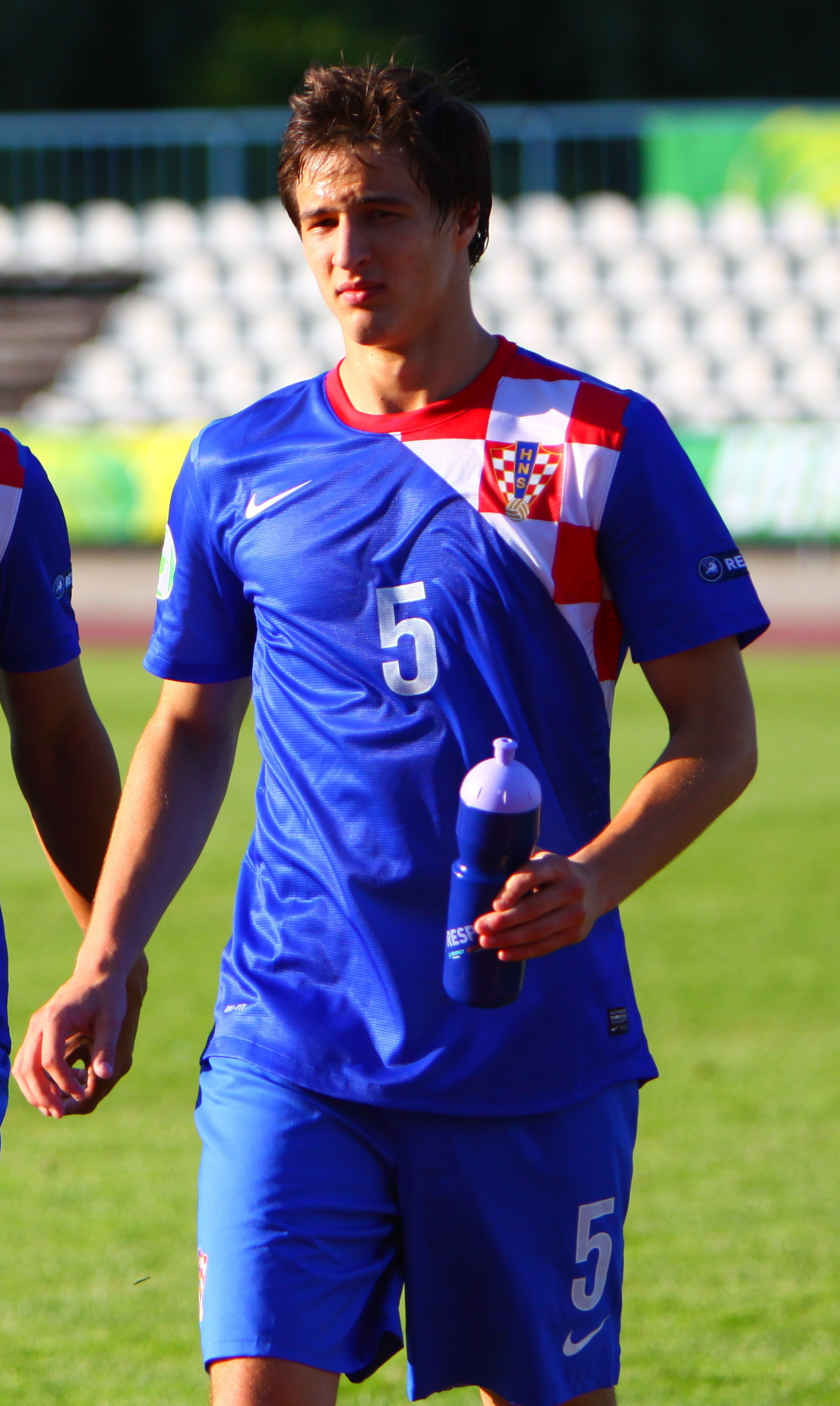
- Mitrović with Croatia U20 in 2012

Personal information
- Full name: Matej Mitrović
- Date of birth: 10 November 1993 (age 33)
- Place of birth: Požega, Croatia
- Height: 1.87 m (6 ft 2 in)
- Position: Defender

Team information
- Current team: Al Ahli
- Number: 5

Youth career
- 2002−2005: Kutjevo
- 2005−2009: Kamen Ingrad
- 2009−2011: Papuk Velika
- 2011: Cibalia

Senior career*
Years	Team	Apps	(Gls)
2011–2013	Cibalia	40	(0)
2013–2017	Rijeka	77	(3)
2017–2018	Beşiktaş	9	(0)
2018	→ Club Brugge (loan)	10	(0)
2018–2022	Club Brugge	29	(0)
2022–2024	Rijeka	31	(2)
2024–2025	Al Ahli	25	(0)

International career^{‡}
2012	Croatia U19	8	(1)
2012–2013	Croatia U20	5	(1)
2013–2014	Croatia U21	5	(0)
2014–2018	Croatia	12	(2)
- * Club domestic league appearances and goals as of 17 January 2026 ‡ National team caps and goals as of 15 October 2018

Matej Mitrović (Croatian pronunciation: [mǎtej mǐtroʋitɕ]; born 10 November 1993) is a Croatian professional footballer who plays as a defender , He also played for Croatia national team.

== Club career ==
Mitrović made his professional debut for Cibalia on 25 February 2012, aged 18, coming on as a substitute in an away win against Slaven Belupo. In September 2013, he signed a two-year contract with Rijeka in the Prva HNL. During his first season with Rijeka, Mitrović was member of the squad that won the Croatian Cup, scoring in the final against Dinamo Zagreb. In June 2016, he signed a new three-year contract which tied him with the club until June 2019. On 6 January 2017, he moved to Beşiktaş on a three-year deal for €4.2 million.

On 29 January 2018, Mitrović joined Belgian club Club Brugge on a six-month-long loan deal. On 20 July, he signed permanently for the club after agreeing to a four-year deal.

On 1 July 2022, Mitrović returned to Rijeka.

== International career ==
In November 2014, Mitrović received his first senior national team call-up, when Niko Kovač called him up as an injury replacement for Gordon Schildenfeld. He made his Croatia debut in a friendly against Argentina on 12 November 2014. In October 2016, Mitrović was called up by Ante Čačić as an injury replacement for Dejan Lovren for 2018 FIFA World Cup qualifiers against Kosovo and Finland. On 6 October 2016, he scored his first international goal in the match against Kosovo.

In May 2018, he was named in Croatia's preliminary 32-man squad for the 2018 FIFA World Cup in Russia. However, he did not make the final 23. His last international appearance was a friendly match against Jordan in October 2018.

== Career statistics ==
=== Club ===
As of match played 22 May 2024

Appearances and goals by club, season and competition
Club	Season	League			National cup (Note: Includes Croatian Football Cup, Turkish Cup, Belgian Cup)		Europe		Other		Total	
Club	Season	Division	Apps	Goals	Apps	Goals	Apps	Goals	Apps	Goals	Apps	Goals
Cibalia	2011–12	1. HNL	4	0	1	0	–		–		5	0
Cibalia	2012–13	1. HNL	33	0	6	0	–		–		39	0
Cibalia	2013–14	2. HNL	3	0	–		–		–		3	0
Cibalia	Total		40	0	7	0	–		–		47	0
Rijeka	2013–14	1. HNL	8	0	4	1	–		–		12	1
Rijeka	2014–15	1. HNL	26	1	2	0	8 (Note: Appearances in UEFA Europa League)	0	1 (Note: Appearance in Croatian Football Super Cup)	0	37	1
Rijeka	2015–16	1. HNL	23	1	5	0	1	0	–		29	1
Rijeka	2016–17	1. HNL	20	1	3	1	2	0	–		25	2
Beşiktaş	2016–17	Süper Lig	7	0	3	0	4	0	–		14	0
Beşiktaş	2017–18	Süper Lig	2	0	4	0	2 (Note: Appearances in UEFA Champions League)	0	0	0	8	0
Beşiktaş	Total		9	0	7	0	6	0	0	0	22	0
Club Brugge (loan)	2017–18	Belgian First Division A	10	0	2	1	–		–		12	1
Club Brugge	2018–19	Belgian First Division A	12	0	0	0	1	0	1 (Note: Appearance in Belgian Super Cup)	0	13	0
Club Brugge	2019–20	Belgian First Division A	7	0	0	0	5 (Note: Four appearances in UEFA Champions League, one appearance in UEFA Europa League)	0	0	0	12	0
Club Brugge	2020–21	Belgian First Division A	6	0	1	0	0	0	0	0	7	0
Club Brugge	2021–22	Belgian First Division A	4	0	1	0	0	0	1	0	6	0
Club Brugge	Total		39	0	4	1	6	0	2	0	51	1
Rijeka	2022–23	1. HNL	5	0	–		–		–		5	0
Rijeka	2023–24	1. HNL	26	2	2	0	3 (Note: Appearances in UEFA Europa Conference League)	0	–		31	2
Rijeka	Total		108	5	16	2	14	0	1	0	139	7
Career total			196	5	34	3	26	0	3	0	259	8

=== International ===
As of match played 15 October 2018

Appearances and goals by national team and year
National team	Year	Apps	Goals
Croatia	2014	1	0
Croatia	2015	0	0
Croatia	2016	3	1
Croatia	2017	5	0
Croatia	2018	3	1
Total		12	2

As of match played 15 October 2018
Croatia score listed first, score column indicates score after each Mitrović goal

No.	Date	Venue	Cap	Opponent	Score	Result	Competition
1	6 October 2016	Loro Boriçi Stadium, Shkodër, Albania	2	Kosovo	4–0	6–0	2018 FIFA World Cup qualification
2	15 October 2018	Stadion Rujevica, Rijeka, Croatia	12	Jordan	2–0	2–1	Friendly

== Honours ==
Rijeka

- Croatian Football Cup: 2013–14
- Croatian Football Super Cup: 2014

Beşiktaş

- Süper Lig: 2016–17

Club Brugge

- Belgian First Division A: 2017–18, 2019–20, 2020–21
- Belgian Super Cup: 2018, 2021

Individual

- Team of the Year: 2015
