= Marco Pašalić =

German-Croatian footballer (born 2000)

- Pašalić with Orlando City in 2026

Personal information
- Date of birth: 14 September 2000 (age 26)
- Place of birth: Karlsruhe, Germany
- Height: 1.77 m (5 ft 10 in)
- Position: Right winger

Team information
- Current team: Orlando City
- Number: 87

Youth career
- SV Sandhausen
- Karlsruher SC
- SG Siemens Karlsruhe
- –2016: TSG Hoffenheim
- 2016–2019: Karlsruher SC
- 2019–2021: VfB Stuttgart

Senior career*
Years	Team	Apps	(Gls)
2020–2021	VfB Stuttgart II	35	(8)
2021–2023	Borussia Dortmund II	35	(6)
2021–2023	Borussia Dortmund	1	(0)
2023–2025	HNK Rijeka	49	(10)
2025–	Orlando City	57	(15)

International career^{‡}
2016	Croatia U17	1	(0)
2021–2022	Croatia U21	4	(0)
2023–	Croatia	22	(2)
- * Club domestic league appearances and goals as of 23:47, 7 November 2026 (UTC) ‡ National team caps and goals as of 23:40, 15 November 2026 (UTC)

Marco Pašalić (Croatian pronunciation: [mâːrko pǎʃalitɕ]; born 14 September 2000) is a professional footballer who plays as a right winger for Major League Soccer club Orlando City. Born in Germany, he plays for the Croatia national team.

Pašalić is a product of six different German academies, but graduated from the academy of VfB Stuttgart. In Pašalić's initial years as a professional footballer, he spent most of his time playing for the reserve teams of VfB Stuttgart and Borussia Dortmund respectively. In 2022, Pašalić made his Bundesliga debut, which would ultimately be his only appearance in the league thus far. The following year, Pašalić moved to Croatia and joined HNK Rijeka.

In 2023, Pašalić made his debut for the Croatia national team, and the following year he was named to Croatia's UEFA Euro 2024 squad. After two seasons in Croatia, he joined Major League Soccer franchise Orlando City in 2025 as a designated player and in his debut season he was named to the MLS All-Star team. Pašalić represented Croatia at the 2026 FIFA World Cup.

== Club career ==
=== Early career ===
Pašalić received his early training in his hometown with Karlsruher SC and SG Siemens Karlsruhe, as well as in the youth teams of SV Sandhausen and TSG 1899 Hoffenheim. In 2016, he returned to Karlsruher, where he played for three years. Following trial training sessions at Bayern Munich and NK Osijek, he joined VfB Stuttgart II, the reserve team of VfB Stuttgart, in 2019.

=== VfB Stuttgart II ===
On 5 September 2020, Pašalić made his senior debut for VfB Stuttgart II in the Regionalliga Südwest division when he played the full match of a 2–0 loss at home to Hessen Kassel. On 24 October, Pašalić scored his first senior goal, the reserve team's second in a 2–2 draw with Kickers Offenbach. Pašalić would go on to score eight goals across 24 appearances.

=== Borussia Dortmund II and Borussia Dortmund ===
On 21 May 2021, Pašalić announced on his Instagram that he would join 3. Liga club Borussia Dortmund II, the reserve team of Bundesliga club Borussia Dortmund. On 24 July, Pašalić made his debut for the club when he started at FSV Zwickau on the opening matchweek of the 2021–22 3. Liga season. The game would end 2–1 in Borussia Dortmund II's favor, with Pašalić coming off in the 78th-minute for Cebrail Makreckis.

In the following matchweek, Pašalić scored his first goal for the club, the first goal of a 1–1 draw with Waldhof Mannheim on 31 July. After Pašalić scored two goals in three games for the reserve team, Borussia Dortmund coach Marco Rose called him into the squad for the 2021 DFL-Supercup on 17 August. Pašalić entered as a 78th-minute substitute for Giovanni Reyna in the final phase of the 3–1 defeat against Bayern Munich. Pašalić would finish the season with two goals and one assist across 13 appearances.

In the following season on 8 November 2022, he made his Bundesliga debut for Borussia Dortmund under coach Edin Terzić in a 2–0 away defeat against VfL Wolfsburg. Across the season with the reserve team, Pašalić's playing time would more than double and he would increase his output to four goals across 22 appearances.

=== HNK Rijeka ===
On 22 June 2023, Pašalić moved to Croatian Football League club HNK Rijeka on a four-year contract. On 27 June, Pašalić made his debut for the club and international debut in the qualifying rounds of the UEFA Europa Conference League when he came on as a 69th-minute substitute for Alen Grgić in a 1–0 win over KF Dukagjini.

In the following leg on 3 August, Pašalić scored his first goal for the club when he scored the first goal of a 6–1 win. Pašalić scored his first league goal for the club in the following match when he scored the third goal of a 6–0 rout of rivals Istra 1961 on 6 August. Pašalić would score six goals and make two assists across 30 league appearances in his first season with the club.

On 25 June 2024, Pašalić made his UEFA Europa League debut in the qualifying rounds of the tournament in goalless draw with Corvinul Hunedoara. On 18 September, Pašalić scored his first Croatian Cup goal when he scored the second goal of a 3–1 victory over Neretvanac. On 22 October, Pašalić scored his first senior brace in a 3–0 win at NK Bednja Beletinec in the Croatian Football Cup. Pašalić ended his time with the club with four goals and three assists across 19 league appearances in his second season.

=== Orlando City ===
Pašalić playing with Orlando City in 2026

On 5 February 2025, Major League Soccer club Orlando City announced the signing of Pašalić as a Designated Player on a three-year contract with a club option to extend into 2028. Pašalić made his debut in the opening match of the season against Philadelphia Union, scoring a brace in a 4–2 loss. Pašalić's opening goal of the match which was scored in the 8th-minute was the fastest in any of Orlando City's home openers in MLS and the fastest goal for a club debut, beating Daryl Dike's previous record in which he scored in the 17th-minute in 2020 against Inter Miami.

On 22 March, Pašalić scored the fourth goal of a 4–1 victory over D.C. United. Pašalić's goal was voted Goal of the Matchday by fans four days later with 64.7% of the vote share. On 15 July, Pašalić was selected by head coach Nico Estévez to represent the league in the 2025 MLS All-Star Game against the Liga MX All-Stars on July 23 at Q2 Stadium in Austin, Texas. The MLS All-Stars would defeat the Liga MX All-Stars 3–1 with Pašalić coming on as a 34th-minute substitute for Hirving Lozano before being substituted off in the second half for Orlando City teammate Alex Freeman.

In Pašalić's debut season in Major League Soccer, he contributed 16 goals and nine assists across all competitions for a total of 25 goal contributions, his most prolific season in his career thus far. League writer Joseph Lowery described Pašalić as the ninth most impactful signing of the 2025 season.

Following the 2026 FIFA World Cup, Pašalić became a transfer target for newly promoted Premier League club Hull City head coach Sergej Jakirović, with Jakirović describing Pašalić as an "option for the right wing". However, any deal to sign Pašalić ultimately fell through, and the club moved onto other targets. Pašalić returned to playing for Orlando City on 8 August 2026, scoring in a 2–1 loss to León in the Leagues Cup.

== International career ==
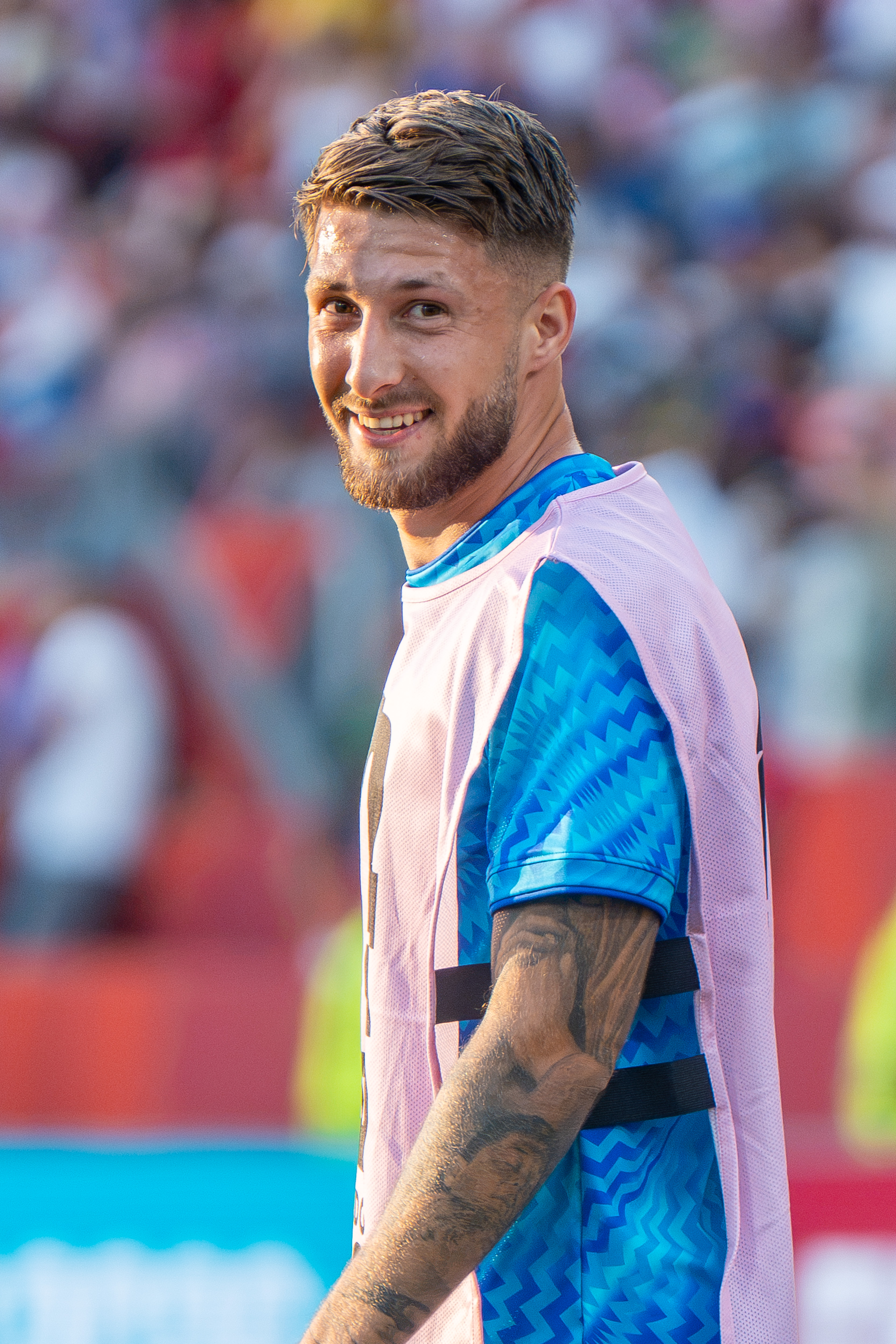
Pašalić with Croatia in 2026

Pašalić made appearances for the Croatian youth national teams of U17, and U21.

On 18 November 2023, Pašalić made his senior debut for Croatia in a 2–0 away win against Latvia during the Euro 2024 qualifying. On 20 May 2024, he was selected in the 26-man squad for the UEFA Euro 2024. A few weeks later, on 3 June, he scored his first international goal in a 3–0 friendly victory over North Macedonia prior to the tournament.

On 26 May 2025, Pašalić was called up by Croatia head coach Zlatko Dalić for World Cup qualifiers matches against Gibraltar and Czech Republic. On 18 May 2026, Pašalić was selected by Dalić for the 2026 FIFA World Cup. Pašalić was recalled to the national team by new head coach Slaven Bilić on 7 September following the World Cup for 2026–27 UEFA Nations League matches.

== Personal life ==
Pašalić was born in Karlsruhe to a Croatian refugee family who fled to Germany to escape the Yugoslav Wars in the early 1990s. Pašalić stated that he was "grateful to grow up in Germany", but that he is "fully Croatian" and that he had always opted to play for Croatia internationally. Pašalić has two brothers, one of whom owns a construction company. As a teenager, Pašalić worked for the construction company after training sessions and would often work into the early morning hours, but his brother would allow him time to rest before the next training session.

== Career statistics ==
=== Club ===
As of match played 19 November 2026

Appearances and goals by club, season and competition
Club	Season	League			National cup (Note: Includes DFB-Pokal, Croatian Cup, U.S. Open Cup)		Continental		Other		Total	
Club	Season	Division	Apps	Goals	Apps	Goals	Apps	Goals	Apps	Goals	Apps	Goals
VfB Stuttgart II	2020–21	Regionalliga Südwest	35	8	—		—		—		35	8
Borussia Dortmund II	2021–22	3. Liga	13	2	—		—		—		13	2
Borussia Dortmund II	2022–23	3. Liga	22	4	—		—		—		22	4
Borussia Dortmund II	Total		35	6	—		—		—		35	6
Borussia Dortmund	2021–22	Bundesliga	0	0	0	0	0	0	1 (Note: Appearance in DFL-Supercup)	0	1	0
Borussia Dortmund	2022–23	Bundesliga	1	0	0	0	0	0	—		1	0
Borussia Dortmund	Total		1	0	0	0	0	0	1	0	2	0
HNK Rijeka	2023–24	HNL	30	6	5	0	6 (Note: Appearances in UEFA Europa Conference League)	2	—		41	8
HNK Rijeka	2024–25	HNL	19	4	2	3	6 (Note: Four appearances in UEFA Europa League, two appearances in UEFA Conference League)	0	—		27	7
HNK Rijeka	Total		49	10	7	3	12	2	—		68	15
Orlando City	2025	Major League Soccer	33	12	1	1	—		7 (Note: Six appearances and two goals in Leagues Cup, one appearance in MLS Cup playoffs)	2	41	15
Orlando City	2026	Major League Soccer	24	3	2	0	—		4 (Note: Three appearances and one goal in Leagues Cup, one appearance in MLS Cup playoffs)	1	30	4
Orlando City	Total		57	15	3	1	—		11	3	71	20
Career total			176	38	10	4	12	2	12	23	210	48

=== International ===
As of match played 15 November 2026

Appearances and goals by national team and year
National team	Year	Apps	Goals
Croatia	2023	2	0
Croatia	2024	3	1
Croatia	2025	6	0
Croatia	2026	11	1
Total		22	2

Scores and results list Croatia's goal tally first.

List of international goals scored by Marco Pašalić
No.	Date	Venue	Cap	Opponent	Score	Result	Competition
1	3 June 2024	Stadion Rujevica, Rijeka, Croatia	5	North Macedonia	3–0	3–0	Friendly
2	26 September 2026	Fortuna Arena, Prague, Czech Republic	19	Czech Republic	2–1	2–1	2026–27 UEFA Nations League A

== Honours ==
Individual

- MLS All-Star: 2025
