= Lindon Selahi =

Albanian footballer

Personal information
- Full name: Lindon Selahi
- Date of birth: 26 February 1999 (age 27)
- Place of birth: Namur, Belgium
- Height: 1.80 m (5 ft 11 in)
- Position: Midfielder

Team information
- Current team: Widzew Łódź
- Number: 18

Youth career
- 2004–2005: CAPS Namur
- 2005–2006: Sportive Jamboise
- 2006–2011: UR Namur
- 2011–2014: Standard Liège
- 2014–2016: Anderlecht
- 2016–2018: Standard Liège

Senior career*
Years	Team	Apps	(Gls)
2017–2019	Standard Liège	1	(0)
2019–2021	Twente	30	(2)
2021	→ Willem II (loan)	16	(0)
2021–2025	Rijeka	153	(9)
2025–	Widzew Łódź	24	(1)

International career^{‡}
2014	Belgium U16	2	(0)
2015	Albania U17	5	(0)
2018–2019	Albania U21	6	(0)
2019–2020	Albania	4	(0)
- * Club domestic league appearances and goals as of 16:01, 26 May 2026 (UTC) ‡ National team caps and goals as of 19 November 2020

Lindon Selahi (born 26 February 1999) is a professional footballer who plays as a midfielder for Ekstraklasa club Widzew Łódź. Born in Belgium, he plays for the Albania national team.

== Early life ==
Selahi was born in Namur, Belgium to an Albanian family from North Macedonia. He started playing football at the age of 4 with local clubs.

== Club career ==
=== Youth career ===
Selahi started his football career in local clubs, he joined UR Namur which played in the second division at this time, he regularly played with older boys and was captain of his teams. He was noticed by Standard Liège staff and joined the club in 2011. He left the Walloon club to join RSC Anderlecht, then he joined Standard Liège again in 2016. During his youth career at Standard Liège and Anderlecht, Selahi has played with many players of the talented 99-born generation, many of them became professional football players in and outside Belgium.

=== Standard Liège ===
In June 2016, Selahi signed his first professional contract with Standard Liège. Selahi made his professional debut for Standard Liège in a 3-1 Belgian First Division A win over Anderlecht on 10 May 2018.

=== Twente ===
On 6 June 2019, Selahi signed a two-year contract with an option of further one with the Dutch club FC Twente. He made his official debut in a league game against PSV Eindhoven and scored his first Eredivisie goal on 25 October 2019 against FC Emmen.

==== Loan to Willem II Tilburg ====
On 15 January 2021, Selahi moved to Dutch club Willem II Tilburg, on loan until the end of the season.

=== HNK Rijeka ===
On 24 July 2021, Selahi signed a three-year contract with Croatian club HNK Rijeka, he arrived as a free agent.

=== Widzew Łódź ===
On 1 July 2025, Selahi joined Polish club Widzew Łódź on a three-year deal, with an option for a fourth year, where he was reunited with his former Rijeka manager Željko Sopić. Selahi was brought in as a key addition to support the club's strategic restructuring aimed at building a team capable of competing at the European level, under the leadership of new owner Robert Dobrzycki, CEO of Panattoni.

== International career ==
Selahi was born in Belgium, his family is of Albanian descent from North Macedonia, his grandparents left Kumanovo in the late 1950s then moved to Belgium in the 1960s. Selahi's family still lives in Belgium today but is attached to the Albanian homeland, all of them speak perfect Albanian. Selahi was a youth international footballer for Belgium. He had the choice between several national teams: Kosovo, Albania, Belgium and North Macedonia but he chose to represent Albania and obtained an Albanian passport in 2018. Selahi also represented the Albania U17s in a pair of friendly tournaments in 2015.

He made his debut with the Albania U21 national team against Bosnia and Herzegovina. In October 2019, he was called by the senior Albania national team. He made his debut on 14 October 2019 in a Euro 2020 qualifier against Moldova. He substituted Keidi Bare in the 89th minute.

== Personal life ==
Selahi is the cousin of fellow professional footballer Ardon Jashari, who plays as a midfielder for Belgian Pro League side Club Brugge, and represents the Switzerland national team.

== Career statistics ==
=== Club ===
As of match played 23 May 2026

Appearances and goals by club, season and competition
Club	Season	League			National cup (Note: Includes KNVB Cup, Croatian Cup, Polish Cup)		Europe		Other		Total	
Club	Season	Division	Apps	Goals	Apps	Goals	Apps	Goals	Apps	Goals	Apps	Goals
Standard Liège	2017–18	Belgian First Division A	1	0	0	0	—		—		1	0
Standard Liège	2018–19	Belgian First Division A	0	0	0	0	—		—		0	0
Standard Liège	Total		1	0	0	0	—		—		1	0
FC Twente	2019–20	Eredivisie	25	2	1	0	—		—		26	2
FC Twente	2020–21	Eredivisie	5	0	1	0	—		—		6	0
FC Twente	Total		30	2	2	0	—		—		32	2
Willem II (loan)	2020–21	Eredivisie	16	0	0	0	—		—		16	0
Rijeka	2021–22	1. HNL	30	2	4	0	2 (Note: Appearances in UEFA Conference League)	0	—		36	2
Rijeka	2022–23	1. HNL	33	2	1	0	2	0	—		36	2
Rijeka	2023–24	1. HNL	30	4	3	0	6	0	—		39	4
Rijeka	2024–25	1. HNL	30	1	6	0	6 (Note: Four appearances in UEFA Europa League, two appearances in UEFA Conference League)	0	—		42	1
Rijeka	Total		123	9	14	0	16	0	0	0	153	9
Widzew Łódź	2025–26	Ekstraklasa	24	1	3	0	—		—		27	1
Career total			194	12	19	0	16	0	0	0	229	12

=== International ===
As of 19 November 2020

Appearances and goals by national team and year
National team	Year	Apps	Goals
Albania	2019	1	0
Albania	2020	3	0
Total		4	0

== Honours ==
Standard Liège

- Belgian Cup: 2017–18

Rijeka

- Croatian Football League: 2024–25
- Croatian Football Cup: 2024–25
