= Veldin Hodža =

Kosovan footballer

Veldin Hoxha
Personal information
- Date of birth: 15 October 2002 (age 24)
- Place of birth: Rijeka, Croatia
- Height: 1.83 m (6 ft 0 in)
- Position: Defensive midfielder

Team information
- Current team: Rubin Kazan
- Number: 22

Youth career
- 2008–2021: Rijeka

Senior career*
Years	Team	Apps	(Gls)
2020–2021	Rijeka	0	(0)
2021	→ Orijent 1919 (loan)	30	(1)
2022	Hrvatski Dragovoljac	16	(0)
2022–2024	Rijeka	70	(8)
2024–	Rubin Kazan	66	(6)

International career^{‡}
2018	Croatia U17	6	(0)
2019	Croatia U18	2	(0)
2021	Croatia U19	1	(0)
2022–2024	Croatia U21	21	(3)
2025–	Kosovo	13	(1)
- * Club domestic league appearances and goals as of 21 November 2026 ‡ National team caps and goals as of 15:23, 14 November 2026 (UTC)

Veldin Hodža (Albanian: Veldin Hoxha; born 15 October 2002) is a Kosovan professional footballer who plays as a defensive midfielder for Russian Premier League club Rubin Kazan. Born in Croatia, he represented that nation at youth international levels but in 2025 switched to play for Kosovo national team at senior level.

== Club career ==
On 7 October 2020, Hodža made his senior competitive debut against Dilj in Croatian Football Cup first round. He scored a goal in the 69th minute and Rijeka won 6–0. On 26 November 2020, Hodža made his first appearance in a UEFA competition, coming in as a substitute in the 87th minute for Gnezda Čerin in their Europa League group stage match against Napoli. He then joined Orijent on loan in the winter transfer window. He was taken off loan to Orijent and moved back to Rijeka, where his contract was formally terminated, and he joined the newly promoted club Hrvatski Dragovoljac to help with their relegation battle.

On 20 June 2022, Hodža rejoined his former club Rijeka, signing a contract until summer 2024.

On 12 September 2024, Hodža signed a four-year contract with Rubin Kazan in Russia.

== International career ==
From 2018, until 2024, Hodža has been part of Croatia at youth international level, respectively has been part of the U17, U18, U19 and U21 teams and he with these teams played thirty matches and scored three goals. On 15 June 2023, Hodža was included in Croatia U21's 23-man squad for the UEFA Euro 2023 held in Georgia and Romania, where he played in two of the three group stage matches, one as a substitute, and one as a starter as Croatia finished third in their group and did not advance to the knockout stage.

In October 2023, Hodža's agent confirmed that the Kosovo national team had shown interest in him, following a meeting between Football Federation of Kosovo president Agim Ademi and the player three months earlier after his 2023–24 UEFA Europa Conference League second qualifying round match with Rijeka against Dukagjini.

On 12 June 2025, the Football Federation of Kosovo announced that Hodža had decided to represent their national team. On 29 August 2025, he accepted Kosovo's call-up for the 2026 FIFA World Cup qualification matches against Switzerland and Sweden. On 2 September 2025, Hodža's request to switch international allegiance to Kosovo was approved by FIFA. His debut with Kosovo came six days later in the 2026 FIFA World Cup qualification match against Sweden after coming on as a substitute at last minutes in place of Florent Muslija.

== Personal life ==
Born in Rijeka, Hodža is of Gorani origin from Restelicë, Dragash.

== Career statistics ==
=== Club ===
As of match played 21 November 2026

Appearances and goals by club, season and competition
Club	Season	League			Cup		Europe		Total	
Club	Season	Division	Apps	Goals	Apps	Goals	Apps	Goals	Apps	Goals
Rijeka	2019–20	Croatian First League	0	0	0	0	0	0	0	0
Rijeka	2020–21	Croatian First League	0	0	1	0	1 (Note: Appearances in UEFA Europa League)	0	2	0
Rijeka	Total		0	0	1	0	1	0	2	0
Orijent 1919 (loan)	2020–21	Croatian Second League	16	0	0	0	—		16	0
Orijent 1919 (loan)	2021–22	Croatian Second League	14	1	1	0	—		15	1
Orijent 1919 (loan)	Total		30	1	1	0	—		33	1
Hrvatski Dragovoljac	2021–22	Croatian First League	16	1	0	0	—		16	1
Rijeka	2022–23	Croatian League	33	1	2	0	2 (Note: Appearances in UEFA Conference League)	0	37	1
Rijeka	2023–24	Croatian League	32	5	6	1	6	0	44	6
Rijeka	2024–25	Croatian League	5	2	1	0	5 (Note: Three appearances in UEFA Europa League, two appearances in UEFA Conference League)	0	11	2
Rijeka	Total		70	8	9	1	13	0	92	9
Rubin Kazan	2024–25	Russian Premier League	22	2	4	0	—		26	2
Rubin Kazan	2025–26	Russian Premier League	29	3	6	0	—		35	3
Rubin Kazan	2026–27	Russian Premier League	15	1	4	0	—		19	1
Rubin Kazan	Total		66	6	14	0	0	0	80	6
Career total			182	16	25	1	14	0	221	17

=== International ===
As of match played 14 November 2026

Appearances and goals by national team and year
National team	Year	Apps	Goals
Kosovo
Kosovo	2025	4	0
Kosovo	2026	9	1
Total		13	1

Kosovo score listed first, score column indicates score after each Hodža goal.

List of international goals scored by Hodža
No.	Date	Venue	Opponent	Score	Result	Competition
1	26 March 2026	Tehelné pole, Bratislava, Slovakia	Slovakia	1–1	4–3	2026 FIFA World Cup qualification

== Honours ==
Rijeka

- Croatian Football League: 2024–25
