= Naïs Djouahra =

French footballer (born 1999)

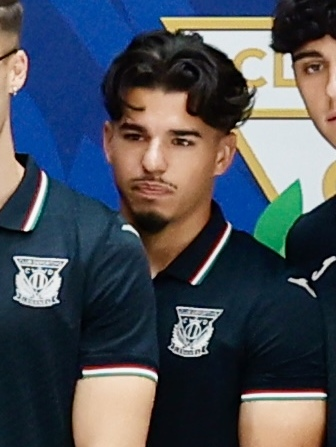
- Djouahra with Leganés in 2024

Personal information
- Date of birth: 23 November 1999 (age 26)
- Place of birth: Bourgoin-Jallieu, France
- Height: 1.71 m (5 ft 7 in)
- Position: Winger

Team information
- Current team: Arouca
- Number: 7

Youth career
- Ruy Montceau
- Bourgoin-Jallieu
- 2012–2018: Saint-Étienne

Senior career*
Years	Team	Apps	(Gls)
2018–2022	Real Sociedad B	65	(7)
2020–2022	Real Sociedad	8	(0)
2020–2021	→ Mirandés (loan)	27	(4)
2022–2025	Rijeka	52	(6)
2023–2024	→ Leganés (loan)	28	(1)
2025–	Arouca	34	(6)
- * Club domestic league appearances and goals as of 25 May 2026

Naïs Djouahra (born 23 November 1999) is a French professional footballer who plays as a left winger for Portuguese Primeira Liga club Arouca.

== Club career ==
Born in Bourgoin-Jallieu, Auvergne-Rhône-Alpes, Djouahra began his career with US Ruy Montceau at the age of six. He subsequently represented FC Bourgoin Jallieu before joining AS Saint-Étienne's youth setup for the under-14s.

On 3 July 2018, after opting not to renew his contract with Saint-Étienne, Djouahra signed a two-year contract with Real Sociedad, being initially assigned to the reserves in Segunda División B. He made his senior debut on 1 September, starting and scoring his team's second in a 3–0 home win against SCD Durango.

On 26 February 2019, after establishing himself as a regular for Sanse, Djouahra renewed his contract until 2021. He made his first team – and La Liga – debut on 29 June of the following year, coming on as a late substitute for Aritz Elustondo in a 2–1 away loss against Getafe CF.

On 30 September 2020, Djouahra was loaned to Segunda División side CD Mirandés for the season. He scored his first professional goal on 13 February of the following year, netting the opener in a 3–3 home draw against Girona FC.

Back to Sanse for the 2021–22 campaign, Djouahra was assigned back at the B-team now also in division two, but also featured regularly with the main squad. On 2 August 2022, he was transferred to Croatian Football League side HNK Rijeka, for a rumoured fee of € 750,000.

On 31 August 2023, Djouahra returned to Spain and its second division, after agreeing to a one-year loan deal with CD Leganés.

On 2 July 2025, Djouahra signed a two-season contract with Arouca in the Portuguese top tier.

== Personal life ==
Born in France, Djouahra is of Algerian descent.

== Career statistics ==
=== Club career ===
As of 6 March 2026

Club	Season	League			Cup		Continental		Total	
Club	Season	Division	Apps	Goals	Apps	Goals	Apps	Goals	Apps	Goals
Real Sociedad B	2018-19	Segunda División B	28	4	—		—		28	4
Real Sociedad B	2019-20	Segunda División B	21	3	—		—		21	3
Real Sociedad B	2021-22	Segunda División	19	0	—		—		19	0
Real Sociedad B	Total		68	7	—		—		68	7
Real Sociedad	2018-19	La Liga	0	0	0	0	—		0	0
Real Sociedad	2019-20	La Liga	2	0	0	0	—		2	0
Real Sociedad	2021-22	La Liga	7	0	3	1	1 (Note: Appearance(s) in UEFA Europa League)	0	11	1
Real Sociedad	2022-23	La Liga	0	0	—		—		0	0
Real Sociedad	Total		9	0	3	1	1	0	13	1
Mirandés (loan)	2020-21	Segunda División	27	4	1	0	—		28	4
Rijeka	2022-23	Croatian Football League	19	1	2	0	—		21	1
Rijeka	2023-24	Croatian Football League	5	1	—		3 (Note: Appearance(s) in UEFA Europa Conference League)	1	8	2
Rijeka	2024-25	Croatian Football League	28	4	5	2	2 (Note: 1 appearance each in UEFA Europa League and UEFA Conference League)	0	35	6
Rijeka	Total		52	6	7	2	5	1	64	9
Leganés (loan)	2023-24	Segunda División	28	1	2	0	—		30	1
Arouca	2025-26	Primeira Liga	25	6	1	1	—		26	7
Career Total			209	24	14	4	6	1	229	29

== Honours ==
Leganés

- Segunda División: 2023–24

Rijeka

- Croatian Football League: 2024–25
- Croatian Football Cup: 2024–25
