= Ivan Smolčić =

Croatian footballer (born 2000)

Personal information
- Date of birth: 17 August 2000 (age 26)
- Place of birth: Gospić, Croatia
- Height: 1.81 m (5 ft 11 in)
- Positions: Right-back; centre-back

Team information
- Current team: Como
- Number: 28

Youth career
- 2008–2014: Gospić 91
- 2014–2019: Rijeka

Senior career*
Years	Team	Apps	(Gls)
2019–2025	Rijeka	70	(1)
2019–2021	→ Orijent (loan)	45	(5)
2021–2022	→ Hrvatski Dragovoljac (loan)	15	(0)
2025–	Como	44	(0)

International career^{‡}
2022	Croatia U21	2	(0)
2025–	Croatia	4	(0)
- * Club domestic league appearances and goals as of 08:56, 8 November 2026 (UTC) ‡ National team caps and goals as of 12 November 2026

Ivan Smolčić (born 17 August 2000) is a Croatian professional footballer who plays as a right-back or centre-back for Serie A club Como and the Croatia national team.

== Club career ==
After playing for the youth teams of Croatian club Rijeka, Smolčić made his professional debut for the club's first team on 13 April 2019, when he entered as a substitute in a 7–0 victory against Inter Zaprešić. The following three seasons, he moved to Orijent and Hrvatski Dragovoljac on loan. Returning to Rijeka in summer 2022, Smolčić soon established himself as a starter. On 3 February 2025, Smolčić signed a four-year contract with Como in Italy.

== International career ==
In November 2022, Smolčić was capped twice for the Croatian under-21 team. On 6 September 2025, he debuted for the Croatian senior team in a 2026 FIFA World Cup qualification against Faroe Islands.

== Personal life ==
His twin brother, Hrvoje, is also a professional footballer. They moved to HNK Rijeka Academy together in 2014.

== Career statistics ==
=== Club ===
As of match played 8 November 2026

Appearances and goals by club, season and competition
Club	Season	League			National cup (Note: Includes Croatian Cup, Coppa Italia)		Europe		Other		Total	
Club	Season	Division	Apps	Goals	Apps	Goals	Apps	Goals	Apps	Goals	Apps	Goals
Rijeka	2018–19	Prva HNL	1	0	0	0	0	0	—		1	0
Rijeka	2021–22	Prva HNL	0	0	2	0	0	0	—		2	0
Rijeka	2022–23	HNL	21	0	2	0	2 (Note: Appearances in UEFA Europa Conference League)	0	—		25	0
Rijeka	2023–24	HNL	30	0	4	1	2	1	—		36	2
Rijeka	2024–25	HNL	18	1	1	0	5 (Note: Three appearances in UEFA Europa League, two appearances in UEFA Conference League)	0	—		24	1
Rijeka	Total		70	1	9	1	9	1	—		88	3
Orijent (loan)	2019–20	Druga HNL	14	2	—		—		2 (Note: Appearances in Druga HNL promotion play-offs)	0	16	2
Orijent (loan)	2020–21	Druga HNL	31	3	—		—		—		31	3
Orijent (loan)	Total		45	5	—		—		2	0	47	2
Hrvatski Dragovoljac (loan)	2021–22	Prva HNL	15	0	—		—		—		15	0
Como	2024–25	Serie A	9	0	—		—		—		9	0
Como	2025–26	Serie A	28	0	3	0	—		—		31	0
Como	2026–27	Serie A	7	0	0	0	4 (Note: Appearances in UEFA Champions League)	0	—		11	0
Como	Total		44	0	3	0	4	0	—		51	0
Career total			174	6	12	1	13	1	2	0	201	8
