= Bruno Goda =

Croatian footballer (born 1998)

Personal information
- Date of birth: 17 April 1998 (age 28)
- Place of birth: Vinkovci, Croatia
- Height: 1.82 m (6 ft 0 in)
- Position: Left-back

Team information
- Current team: Dinamo Zagreb
- Number: 3

Youth career
- –2012: Graničar Županja
- 2012–2016: Dinamo Zagreb
- 2016–2017: Hrvatski Dragovoljac

Senior career*
Years	Team	Apps	(Gls)
2016–2017	Hrvatski Dragovoljac	10	(0)
2017–2022	Slaven Belupo	121	(2)
2022–2025	Rijeka	43	(4)
2025–	Dinamo Zagreb	29	(0)

International career^{‡}
2013	Croatia U15	6	(0)
2013	Croatia U16	1	(0)
2018–19	Croatia U20	4	(0)
- * Club domestic league appearances and goals as of 27 October 2026 ‡ National team caps and goals as of 17 August 2023

Bruno Goda (born 17 April 1998) is a Croatian professional footballer who plays as a left-back for Dinamo Zagreb.

== Career statistics ==
As of match played 27 October 2026

Appearances and goals by club, season and competition
Club	Season	League			Cup		Europe		Other		Total	
Club	Season	Division	Apps	Goals	Apps	Goals	Apps	Goals	Apps	Goals	Apps	Goals
Hrvatski Dragovoljac	2016–17	Prva NL	10	0	—		—		—		10	0
Slaven Belupo	2017–18	Croatian Football League	21	1	2	0	—		—		23	1
Slaven Belupo	2018–19	Croatian Football League	16	1	1	0	—		—		17	1
Slaven Belupo	2019–20	Croatian Football League	28	0	4	1	—		—		32	1
Slaven Belupo	2020–21	Croatian Football League	29	0	2	0	—		—		31	0
Slaven Belupo	2021–22	Croatian Football League	27	0	3	0	—		—		30	0
Slaven Belupo	Total		121	2	12	1	—		—		133	3
Rijeka	2022–23	Croatian Football League	11	0	0	0	0	0	—		11	0
Rijeka	2023–24	Croatian Football League	26	4	4	0	5 (Note: Appearances in UEFA Conference League)	2	—		35	6
Rijeka	2024–25	Croatian Football League	6	0	1	0	—		—		7	0
Rijeka	Total		43	4	5	0	5	2	—		53	6
Dinamo Zagreb	2025–26	Croatian Football League	25	0	5	1	8 (Note: Appearances in UEFA Europa League)	0	—		38	1
Dinamo Zagreb	2026–27	Croatian Football League	4	0	1	0	5 (Note: Three appearances in UEFA Champions League, two appearances in UEFA Europa League)	0	—		10	0
Dinamo Zagreb	Total		29	0	6	1	13	0	—		48	1
Career total			193	6	23	2	18	2	0	0	234	10

== Honours ==
Rijeka

- Croatian Football League: 2024–25
- Croatian Football Cup: 2024–25
