= Marijan Čabraja =

Croatian footballer (born 1997)

Personal information
- Date of birth: 25 February 1997 (age 29)
- Place of birth: Pula, Croatia
- Height: 1.82 m (6 ft 0 in)
- Position: Left-back

Team information
- Current team: Gorica
- Number: 19

Youth career
- –2010: Jadran Poreč
- 2010–2016: Dinamo Zagreb

Senior career*
| Years | Team | Apps | (Gls) |
| 2015–2018 | Dinamo Zagreb II | 56 | (0) |
| 2018–2021 | Gorica | 76 | (3) |
| 2021–2022 | Dinamo Zagreb | 8 | (0) |
| 2021–2022 | → Ferencváros (loan) | 7 | (0) |
| 2022 | → Olimpija Ljubljana (loan) | 13 | (0) |
| 2022–2023 | Hibernian | 25 | (0) |
| 2023–2025 | Rijeka | 11 | (0) |
| 2025– | Gorica | 31 | (1) |

International career
| 2011 | Croatia U14 | 2 | (1) |
| 2012 | Croatia U15 | 4 | (1) |
| 2012 | Croatia U16 | 5 | (0) |
| 2013 | Croatia U17 | 4 | (0) |
| 2015 | Croatia U18 | 2 | (0) |
| 2014–2016 | Croatia U19 | 8 | (1) |
| 2019 | Croatia U21 | 3 | (0) |
- * Club domestic league appearances and goals as of 15 June 2026

Marijan Čabraja (born 25 February 1997) is a Croatian professional footballer who plays as a left-back for Croatian Football League side Gorica.

== Club career ==
Čabraja made his Prva HNL debut for Gorica on 11 August 2018 in a game against Inter Zaprešić.

On 1 February 2021, he signed for Dinamo Zagreb.

On 13 July 2022, Čabraja signed a three-year deal with Scottish Premiership side Hibernian.

After one season in Scotland, he returned to Croatian football with Rijeka.

== International career ==
Čabraja represented Croatia U19 at the 2016 UEFA European Under-19 Championship.
