= Franjo Ivanović =

Footballer (born 2003)

Personal information
- Date of birth: 1 October 2003 (age 23)
- Place of birth: Schwaz, Austria
- Height: 1.82 m (6 ft 0 in)
- Position: Forward

Team information
- Current team: Lens (on loan from Benfica)
- Number: 29

Youth career
- 2008–2015: SVg Mayrhofen
- 2015–2016: JFG Lohwald
- 2016–2023: FC Augsburg

Senior career*
Years	Team	Apps	(Gls)
2021–2023	FC Augsburg II	42	(18)
2023–2024	Rijeka	34	(8)
2024–2025	Union SG	34	(16)
2025–	Benfica	23	(6)
2026–	→ Lens (loan)	7	(2)

International career^{‡}
2017	Croatia U14	3	(0)
2018–19	Croatia U16	8	(3)
2019–20	Croatia U17	3	(0)
2021	Croatia U18	3	(1)
2021–2024	Croatia U19	8	(4)
2023–2024	Croatia U21	7	(1)
2025–	Croatia	12	(2)
- * Club domestic league appearances and goals as of 23:03, 30 October 2026 (UTC) ‡ National team caps and goals as of 3 October 2026

Franjo Ivanović (born 1 October 2003) is a professional footballer who plays as a forward for Ligue 1 club Lens, on loan from Primeira Liga club Benfica. Born in Austria, he plays for the Croatia national team.

== Club career ==
Ivanović started his football career at the age of five in 2008 with SVg Mayrhofen, where he played until 2015. He spent one season at JFG Lohwald and joined the youth academy of Germany's FC Augsburg in 2016. In June 2023, he signed a three-year contract with Croatian side Rijeka.

On 31 August 2024, Ivanović signed a four-year contract with Union SG in Belgium. He capped off his debut season with Union by winning the league title and scoring 20 goals across all competitions.

On 31 July 2025, Benfica announced that Ivanović had signed a five-year contract with the club. One week later, on 6 August, he scored his first goal on his debut in a 2–0 away victory against Nice in the Champions League qualifying.

== International career ==
Ivanović was born in Schwaz, Austria, but holds Croatian citizenship and is eligible to play for Croatia national football team. He was called up for the 2024–25 UEFA Nations League match against France on 20 March 2025, making his senior team debut in the 2–0 home victory against said opponent.

== Career statistics ==
=== Club ===
As of match played 30 October 2026

Appearances and goals by club, season and competition
Club	Season	League			National cup (Note: Includes Croatian Cup, Belgian Cup, Taça de Portugal)		League cup (Note: Includes Taça da Liga)		Continental		Other		Total	
Club	Season	Division	Apps	Goals	Apps	Goals	Apps	Goals	Apps	Goals	Apps	Goals	Apps	Goals
FC Augsburg II	2021–22	Regionalliga Bayern	6	0	—		—		—		—		6	0
FC Augsburg II	2022–23	Regionalliga Bayern	36	18	—		—		—		—		36	18
FC Augsburg II	Total		42	18	—		—		—		—		42	18
HNK Rijeka	2023–24	HNL	30	5	5	4	—		6 (Note: Appearances in UEFA Europa Conference League)	3	—		41	12
HNK Rijeka	2024–25	HNL	4	3	0	0	—		6 (Note: Four appearances in UEFA Europa League, two appearances and one goal in UEFA Conference League)	1	—		10	4
HNK Rijeka	Total		34	8	5	4	—		12	4	—		51	16
Union SG	2024–25	Belgian Pro League	34	16	2	0	—		10 (Note: Appearances in UEFA Europa League)	4	—		46	20
Union SG	2025–26	Belgian Pro League	0	0	—		—		—		1 (Note: Appearance in Belgian Super Cup)	1	1	1
Union SG	Total		34	16	2	0	—		10	4	1	1	47	21
Benfica	2025–26	Primeira Liga	25	6	4	1	2	0	11 (Note: Appearances in UEFA Champions League)	1	0	0	42	8
Benfica	2026–27	Primeira Liga	0	0	—		—		1	0	—		1	0
Benfica	Total		25	6	4	1	2	0	12	1	0	0	43	8
Lens (loan)	2026–27	Ligue 1	7	2	0	0	—		3	0	1 (Note: Appearance in Trophée des Champions)	0	11	2
Career total			142	50	11	5	2	0	37	9	2	1	194	65

=== International ===
As of match played 3 October 2026

Appearances and goals by national team and year
National team	Year	Apps	Goals
Croatia	2025	9	2
Croatia	2026	3	0
Total		12	2

Scores and results list Croatia's goal tally first.

List of international goals scored by Franjo Ivanović
No.	Date	Venue	Cap	Opponent	Score	Result	Competition
1	6 June 2025	Estádio Algarve, Faro/Loulé, Portugal	3	Gibraltar	3–0	7–0	2026 FIFA World Cup qualification
2	6 June 2025	Estádio Algarve, Faro/Loulé, Portugal	3	Gibraltar	4–0	7–0	2026 FIFA World Cup qualification

== Honours ==
NK Rijeka

- HNL: 2024–25

Union Saint-Gilloise

- Belgian Pro League: 2024–25

Lens

- Trophée des Champions: 2026
