= Niko Janković =

Croatian footballer (born 2001)

Personal information
- Date of birth: 25 August 2001 (age 25)
- Place of birth: Zagreb, Croatia
- Height: 1.86 m (6 ft 1 in)
- Position: Attacking midfielder

Team information
- Current team: Rijeka
- Number: 4

Youth career
- –2010: Trnje
- 2010–2013: Dinamo Zagreb
- 2013–2016: Stuttgart
- 2016–2020: Dinamo Zagreb

Senior career*
Years	Team	Apps	(Gls)
2019–2021	Dinamo Zagreb II	23	(5)
2020–2023	Dinamo Zagreb	1	(0)
2021	→ Slaven Belupo (loan)	2	(0)
2021	→ Gorica (loan)	8	(0)
2021–2023	→ Zrinjski Mostar (loan)	31	(4)
2023	→ Rijeka (loan)	19	(2)
2023–	Rijeka	65	(19)
2026	→ Slovan Bratislava (loan)	13	(1)

International career^{‡}
2018–2019	Croatia U18	5	(0)
2019	Croatia U19	7	(2)
2023	Croatia U20	1	(0)
- * Club domestic league appearances and goals as of 19:02, 16 May 2026 (UTC) ‡ National team caps and goals as of 7 June 2023

Niko Janković (born 25 August 2001) is a Croatian professional footballer who plays as a winger for Croatian club Rijeka. He represented Croatia internationally at various youth levels.

== Career statistics ==
As of match played 16 May 2026

Appearances and goals by club, season and competition
Club	Season	League			Cup		Europe		Other		Total	
Club	Season	Division	Apps	Goals	Apps	Goals	Apps	Goals	Apps	Goals	Apps	Goals
Dinamo Zagreb II	2018–19	Croatian First Football League	2	0	—		—		—		2	0
Dinamo Zagreb II	2020–21	Croatian First Football League	21	5	—		—		—		21	5
Dinamo Zagreb II	Total		23	5	—		—		—		23	5
Dinamo Zagreb	2020–21	Croatian Football League	1	0	0	0	0	0	0	0	1	0
Slaven Belupo (loan)	2020–21	Croatian Football League	2	0	—		—		—		2	0
Gorica (loan)	2021–22	Croatian Football League	8	0	1	0	—		—		9	0
Zrinjski Mostar (loan)	2021–22	Bosnian Premier League	13	3	—		—		—		13	3
Zrinjski Mostar (loan)	2022–23	Bosnian Premier League	18	1	—		6 (Note: One appearance in UEFA Champions League, five appearances and two goals in UEFA Conference League)	2	—		24	3
Zrinjski Mostar (loan)	Total		31	4	—		6	2	—		37	6
Rijeka (loan)	2022–23	Croatian Football League	19	2	—		—		—		19	2
Rijeka	2023–24	Croatian Football League	31	11	5	1	6 (Note: Appearances in UEFA Conference League)	2	—		42	14
Rijeka	2024–25	Croatian Football League	34	8	5	0	6 (Note: Four appearances in UEFA Europa League, two appearances in UEFA Conference League)	0	—		45	8
Rijeka	2025–26	Croatian Football League	13	0	1	0	9 (Note: Two appearances in UEFA Champions League, four appearances and one goal in UEFA Europa League, three appearances in UEFA Conference League)	1	—		23	1
Rijeka	Total		65	19	11	1	21	3	—		97	23
Slovan Bratislava	2025–26	Slovak First Football League	13	1	1	0	—		—		14	1
Career total			175	31	13	1	27	1	0	0	215	37

== Honours ==
Rijeka

- Croatian Football League: 2024–25
- Croatian Football Cup: 2024–25
