= Alen Grgić =

Croatian footballer

Personal information
- Date of birth: 10 August 1994 (age 32)
- Place of birth: Nova Gradiška, Croatia
- Height: 1.88 m (6 ft 2 in)
- Positions: Right-back; winger

Team information
- Current team: Slaven Belupo
- Number: 27

Youth career
- 2003–2008: Mladost Cernik
- 2008–2014: Osijek

Senior career*
Years	Team	Apps	(Gls)
2014–2022	Osijek	130	(13)
2015	→ Sesvete (loan)	25	(4)
2016–2017	→ Osijek II	3	(0)
2021	→ Diósgyőr (loan)	18	(0)
2021–2022	→ Slaven Belupo (loan)	9	(2)
2022–2024	Rijeka	49	(3)
2024–2025	Slaven Belupo	30	(7)
2025–2026	Noah	10	(0)
2026–	Slaven Belupo	8	(1)
- * Club domestic league appearances and goals as of 15 June 2026

Alen Grgić (born 10 August 1994) is a Croatian football defender who plays for Croatian Football League club Slaven Belupo.

Grgić played for Rijeka, then joined Slaven Belupo on a one-year contract in 2024. Here he set a career best in terms of goals scored during one season. He helped the club reach the 2025 Croatian Football Cup final against Rijeka. After the contract ran out, Grgić moved to Armenia and Noah, where he got the chance in the 2025–26 UEFA Champions League qualifying.

On 17 February 2026, Slaven Belupo announced the return of Grgić from Noah, on a contract until the summer of 2027.

== Career statistics ==
Appearances and goals by club, season and competition
Club	Season	League			Cup		Continental		Other		Total	
Club	Season	Division	Apps	Goals	Apps	Goals	Apps	Goals	Apps	Goals	Apps	Goals
Osijek	2013–14	1.HNL	5	0	2	1	—		—		7	1
Osijek	2015–16	1.HNL	20	5	2	0	—		—		22	5
Osijek	2016–17	1.HNL	23	1	4	1	—		—		27	2
Osijek	2017–18	1.HNL	30	5	2	0	3	0	—		35	5
Osijek	2018–19	1.HNL	31	1	3	0	2	0	—		36	1
Osijek	2019–20	1.HNL	3	0	0	0	—		—		3	0
Osijek	2020–21	1.HNL	4	1	2	0	1	0	—		7	1
Osijek	Total		116	13	15	2	6	0	0	0	137	15
Sesvete	2014–15	2.HNL	25	4	0	0	—		—		25	4
Sesvete	Total		25	4	0	0	0	0	0	0	25	4
Diósgyőr	2020–21	Nemzeti Bajnokság I	18	0	0	0	—		—		18	0
Diósgyőr	Total		18	0	0	0	0	0	0	0	18	0
Career total			159	17	15	2	6	0	0	0	180	19
