= List of Croatian Football League hat-tricks =

As of November 2020, since the 1992 inception of the top level Croatian association football league competition, the Croatian Football League, 132 players have scored three goals (a hat-trick) or more in a single match. Including players repeating the accomplishment, the feat has been achieved 195 times.

The first player to achieve the feat was Dean Ljubančić, in May 1992, who scored three times for Rijeka in a 3–0 victory over Istra. Eighteen players, on a total of 21 occasions, have scored more than three goals in a match: Marijo Dodik holds the record for most goals in a match, netting six times for Slaven Belupo in a 7–1 victory over Varteks, in October 2000; Goran Vlaović scored more than three goals in three different games (twice in 1993, once in 1995), while Mate Dragičević achieved it in two different games (both in 2002).

In January 1994, both Goran Vlaović and Igor Cvitanović scored hat-tricks for Croatia Zagreb twice in a week, against Dubrovnik in an 8–2 victory and a week later against Osijek in a 7–1 win. In April 2008, Rijeka's Radomir Đalović and Zadar's Želimir Terkeš scored opposing hat-tricks in a match that Rijeka won 5–3; of the 195 total hat-tricks, Terkeš' was the first, and one of only four total, scored by a player on the losing club. The July 2009 fixture between Rijeka and Lokomotiva saw Rijeka's brothers Ahmad and Anas Sharbini both score a hat-trick for the home team.

Eighteen players have score more than one hat-trick, of which four players have each accomplished the feat six different times: Igor Cvitanović, Igor Pamić, Goran Vlaović and Davor Vugrinec. Four players have each scored hat-tricks for at least three clubs: Igor Pamić (Istra, Pazinka, Osijek), Davor Vugrinec (Varteks, Rijeka, Dinamo Zagreb, NK Zagreb), Zoran Zekić (Zadar, Kamen Ingrad, Cibalia) and Ivan Krstanović (NK Zagreb, Rijeka, Zadar).

== Hat-tricks ==
Key
^{6}	Player scored six goals
^{5}	Player scored five goals
^{4}	Player scored four goals
*	Hat-trick scorer's team first in result

Player	Nationality	For	Against	Result	Date	Report
Dean Ljubančić	Croatia	Rijeka	Istra	3–0	2 May 1992	HRnogomet.com
Dinko Livada	Croatia	Radnik	Osijek	3–1	26 September 1992	HRnogomet.com
Ivan Cvjetković	Croatia	Inker Zaprešić	Cibalia	4–1	3 October 1992	HRnogomet.com
Dževad Turković	Croatia	HAŠK Građanski	Radnik	8–2	1 November 1992	HRnogomet.com
Ismet Mulavdić	Bosnia and Herzegovina	Šibenik	Radnik	3–0	29 November 1992	HRnogomet.com
Goran Vlaović	Croatia	Croatia Zagreb	Varteks	5–0	7 March 1993	HRnogomet.com
Goran Vlaović^{4}	Croatia	Croatia Zagreb	Belišće	8–1	25 April 1993	HRnogomet.com
Željko Pakasin	Croatia	Croatia Zagreb	Dubrovnik	3–1	6 June 1993	HRnogomet.com
Igor Pamić	Croatia	Istra	Zadar	5–2	13 June 1993	HRnogomet.com
Igor Cvitanović	Croatia	Croatia Zagreb	Šibenik	4–0	20 August 1993	HRnogomet.com
Tomislav Erceg	Croatia	Hajduk Split	Pazinka	5–1	4 September 1993	HRnogomet.com
Hari Vukas	Croatia	Primorac	Dubrovnik	4–2	30 October 1993	HRnogomet.com
Goran Vlaović	Croatia	Croatia Zagreb	Radnik	5–0	30 October 1993	HRnogomet.com
Igor Pamić	Croatia	Pazinka	Primorac	4–0	6 November 1993	HRnogomet.com
Goran Vlaović^{5}	Croatia	Croatia Zagreb	Pazinka	10–1	12 December 1993	HRnogomet.com
Davor Vugrinec	Croatia	Varteks	Pazinka	4–0	5 March 1994	HRnogomet.com
Goran Vukelja	Croatia	Belišće	Radnik	7–1	6 March 1994	HRnogomet.com
Igor Pamić	Croatia	Pazinka	Belišće	4–1	10 April 1994	HRnogomet.com
Antun Labak	Croatia	Osijek	Belišće	3–3	17 April 1994	HRnogomet.com
Igor Pamić	Croatia	Pazinka	Dubrava	4–0	8 May 1994	HRnogomet.com
Tomislav Erceg	Croatia	Hajduk Split	Istra	4–1	8 May 1994	HRnogomet.com
Rudika Vida	Croatia	Belišće	Varteks	3–0	11 May 1994	HRnogomet.com
Alen Peternac	Croatia	Segesta	Dubrava	5–1	5 June 1994	HRnogomet.com
Tomislav Erceg	Croatia	Hajduk Split	Radnik	10–0	5 June 1994	HRnogomet.com
Goran Vlaović^{4}	Croatia	Croatia Zagreb	Dubrovnik	8–2	5 June 1994	HRnogomet.com
Igor Cvitanović	Croatia	Croatia Zagreb	Dubrovnik	8–2	5 June 1994	HRnogomet.com
Goran Vlaović	Croatia	Croatia Zagreb	Osijek	7–1	12 June 1994	HRnogomet.com
Igor Cvitanović	Croatia	Croatia Zagreb	Osijek	7–1	12 June 1994	HRnogomet.com
Jure Ereš	Croatia	Neretva	Belišće	3–1	25 September 1994	HRnogomet.com
Ylli Shehu	Albania	Šibenik	NK Zagreb	3–3	2 October 1994	HRnogomet.com
Tomislav Erceg^{4}	Croatia	Hajduk Split	Belišće	4–0	14 October 1994	HRnogomet.com
Robert Špehar	Croatia	Osijek	Primorac	5–0	16 October 1994	HRnogomet.com
Alen Peternac	Croatia	Segesta	Osijek	3–1	6 November 1994	HRnogomet.com
Renato Jurčec^{4}	Croatia	Inker Zaprešić	Istra	4–0	11 December 1994	HRnogomet.com
Ylli Shehu	Albania	Šibenik	Primorac Sem-Tem	4–0	14 May 1995	HRnogomet.com
Alen Peternac	Croatia	Croatia Zagreb	Zadar	4–2	31 May 1995	HRnogomet.com
Igor Pamić	Croatia	Osijek	Segesta	4–0	13 August 1995	HRnogomet.com
Igor Pamić	Croatia	Osijek	Hajduk Split	5–3	15 October 1995	HRnogomet.com
Mark Viduka	Australia	Croatia Zagreb	Segesta	4–0	15 October 1995	HRnogomet.com
Vladimir Petrović	Croatia	Segesta	Rijeka	6–0	22 October 1995	HRnogomet.com
Igor Cvitanović^{4}	Croatia	Croatia Zagreb	Istra	4–0	19 November 1995	HRnogomet.com
Tomislav Žitković	Croatia	Inker Zaprešić	Cibalia	3–0	9 March 1996	HRnogomet.com
Igor Cvitanović	Croatia	Croatia Zagreb	Hrvatski Dragovoljac	6–0	5 May 1996	HRnogomet.com
Borimir Perković	Croatia	Rijeka	Istra	4–1	22 May 1996	HRnogomet.com
Igor Cvitanović	Croatia	Croatia Zagreb	Šibenik	4–0	14 August 1996	HRnogomet.com
Irfan Islami	North Macedonia	Mladost 127	Orijent	5–1	1 September 1996	HRnogomet.com
Dumitru Mitu	Romania	Osijek	Rijeka	4–0	8 September 1996	HRnogomet.com
Davor Vugrinec	Croatia	Varteks	Istra	4–0	16 November 1996	HRnogomet.com
Dragan Vukoja	Croatia	Hrvatski Dragovoljac	Šibenik	4–1	16 November 1996	HRnogomet.com
Dragan Vukoja	Croatia	Hrvatski Dragovoljac	Istra	4–1	26 April 1997	HRnogomet.com
Mate Baturina^{4}	Croatia	NK Zagreb	Samobor	6–0	3 August 1997	HRnogomet.com
Mario Bazina	Croatia	Hrvatski Dragovoljac	Slaven Belupo	6–2	17 August 1997	HRnogomet.com
Mario Bazina	Croatia	Hrvatski Dragovoljac	Slaven Belupo	3–0	19 November 1997	HRnogomet.com
Emir Džafič^{4}	Slovenia	Samobor	Slaven Belupo	5–1	15 March 1998	HRnogomet.com
Mark Viduka	Australia	Croatia Zagreb	Zadarkomerc	6–1	22 March 1998	HRnogomet.com
Vladimir Petrović	Croatia	Croatia Zagreb	Zadarkomerc	6–1	22 March 1998	HRnogomet.com
Almir Turković	Bosnia and Herzegovina	Zadarkomerc	Hajduk Split	4–2	29 April 1998	HRnogomet.com
Mirza Golubica	Bosnia and Herzegovina	Mladost 127	Šibenik	4–0	23 August 1998	HRnogomet.com
Dean Računica	Croatia	Hajduk Split	Slaven Belupo	5–0	30 August 1998	HRnogomet.com
Edin Mujčin	Bosnia and Herzegovina	Croatia Zagreb	NK Zagreb	4–0	25 October 1998	HRnogomet.com
Joško Popović	Croatia	Šibenik	Mladost 127	4–1	22 November 1998	HRnogomet.com
Miljenko Mumlek	Croatia	Varteks	Šibenik	7–0	13 December 1998	HRnogomet.com
Veldin Karić^{4}	Croatia	Varteks	Mladost 127	6–0	12 March 1999	HRnogomet.com
Joško Popović^{4}	Croatia	Šibenik	Zadarkomerc	5–1	2 May 1999	HRnogomet.com
Borimir Perković	Croatia	Osijek	Rijeka	5–2	9 May 1999	HRnogomet.com
Vlatko Đolonga	Croatia	Hrvatski Dragovoljac	Istra	5–4	28 August 1999	HRnogomet.com
Goran Meštrović	Croatia	Cibalia	Rijeka	3–1	26 September 1999	HRnogomet.com
Tomo Šokota	Croatia	Croatia Zagreb	Osijek	3–1	12 October 1999	HRnogomet.com
Boško Balaban	Croatia	Rijeka	Hrvatski Dragovoljac	4–2	6 November 1999	HRnogomet.com
Joško Popović	Croatia	NK Zagreb	Rijeka	4–1	7 March 2000	Sportnet.hr
Ivica Banović	Croatia	NK Zagreb	Rijeka	3–2	11 April 2000	Sportnet.hr
Tihomir Nosek	Croatia	Istra	Vukovar '91	4–3	29 April 2000	HRnogomet.com
Ivan Bošnjak	Croatia	Cibalia	Vukovar '91	5–2	9 May 2000	Sportnet.hr
Admir Hasančić	Bosnia and Herzegovina	Rijeka	Slaven Belupo	3–1	9 May 2000	HRnogomet.com
Marijan Vuka	Croatia	Osijek	Hrvatski Dragovoljac	6–2	19 September 2000	Sportnet.hr
Marijo Dodik^{6}	Bosnia and Herzegovina	Slaven Belupo	Varteks	7–1	21 October 2000	Sportnet.hr
Marin Lalić	Croatia	Hrvatski Dragovoljac	Šibenik	5–3	19 November 2000	HRnogomet.com
Veldin Karić	Croatia	Varteks	Hrvatski Dragovoljac	4–0	25 November 2000	Sportnet.hr
Tomo Šokota	Croatia	Dinamo Zagreb	Osijek	4–1	5 May 2001	Sportnet.hr
Ante Milicic	Australia	Rijeka	Hrvatski Dragovoljac	4–1	6 May 2001	HRnogomet.com
Boško Balaban	Croatia	Dinamo Zagreb	Slaven Belupo	6–2	27 May 2001	Sportnet.hr
Miljenko Mumlek	Croatia	Varteks	Hajduk Split	5–1	17 August 2001	Sportnet.hr
Anđelko Kvesić	Croatia	TŠK	Slaven Belupo	4–1	26 August 2001	Sportnet.hr
Ivica Olić^{4}	Croatia	NK Zagreb	TŠK	8–0	23 September 2001	Sportnet.hr
Natko Rački	Croatia	Rijeka	Šibenik	5–0	10 October 2001	Sportnet.hr
Saša Bjelanović	Croatia	Varteks	Zadar	5–1	10 October 2001	Sportnet.hr
Petar Krpan	Croatia	Osijek	Hrvatski Dragovoljac	6–1	21 October 2001	Sportnet.hr
Mate Dragičević^{4}	Croatia	Šibenik	Hrvatski Dragovoljac	4–0	9 March 2002	Sportnet.hr
Dragan Blatnjak	Bosnia and Herzegovina	Zadar	TŠK	7–1	13 April 2002	Sportnet.hr
Mate Dragičević^{4}	Croatia	Šibenik	TŠK	8–0	27 April 2002	Sportnet.hr
Zoran Zekić	Croatia	Zadar	Šibenik	3–2	4 May 2002	Sportnet.hr
Ivica Karabogdan	Croatia	Pomorac	Osijek	5–0	7 May 2003	Sportnet.hr
Ivica Olić	Croatia	Dinamo Zagreb	Varteks	5–1	17 May 2003	Sportnet.hr
Marijo Dodik	Bosnia and Herzegovina	Slaven Belupo	Zadar	5–0	17 May 2003	Sportnet.hr
Goran Ljubojević	Croatia	Osijek	Varteks	3–1	9 August 2003	Sportnet.hr
Zoran Zekić	Croatia	Kamen Ingrad	Varteks	3–0	13 September 2003	Sportnet.hr
Goran Ljubojević	Croatia	Osijek	NK Zagreb	5–2	4 October 2003	HRnogomet.com
Robert Špehar	Croatia	Osijek	Kamen Ingrad	3–2	20 March 2004	HRnogomet.com
Dario Zahora^{4}	Croatia	Dinamo Zagreb	Rijeka	5–0	17 April 2004	Sportnet.hr
Ivica Žuljević	Croatia	Međimurje	Zadar	4–0	18 September 2004	HRnogomet.com
Ivan Bošnjak	Croatia	Dinamo Zagreb	Zadar	7–0	28 May 2005	Sportnet.hr
Marin Prpić	Croatia	Rijeka	Cibalia	4–1	30 July 2005	Sportnet.hr
Eduardo da Silva	Croatia	Dinamo Zagreb	Inter Zaprešić	6–0	14 August 2005	Sportnet.hr
Ahmad Sharbini	Croatia	Rijeka	Varteks	4–1	28 August 2005	Sportnet.hr
Davor Vugrinec	Croatia	Rijeka	Međimurje	4–2	11 March 2006	Sportnet.hr
Stiven Rivić	Croatia	Pula Staro Češko	Inter Zaprešić	4–1	15 April 2006	Sportnet.hr
Davor Vugrinec	Croatia	Rijeka	Hajduk Split	4–0	22 April 2006	Sportnet.hr
Elvir Bolić	Bosnia and Herzegovina	Rijeka	Kamen Ingrad	4–2	5 August 2006	Sportnet.hr
Enes Novinić	Croatia	Varteks	Kamen Ingrad	3–0	19 August 2006	Sportnet.hr
Davor Vugrinec	Croatia	Dinamo Zagreb	Varteks	4–1	14 October 2006	Sportnet.hr
Ahmad Sharbini	Croatia	Rijeka	Cibalia	4–1	28 October 2006	Sportnet.hr
Zoran Zekić	Croatia	Cibalia	Osijek	3–0	11 November 2006	Sportnet.hr
Eduardo da Silva	Croatia	Dinamo Zagreb	Cibalia	4–0	18 November 2006	Sportnet.hr
Marko Kartelo	Croatia	Šibenik	Kamen Ingrad	4–1	2 December 2006	Sportnet.hr
Ahmad Sharbini	Croatia	Rijeka	NK Zagreb	3–1	2 May 2007	Sportnet.hr
Stjepan Jukić	Croatia	Osijek	Međimurje	6–1	5 May 2007	Sportnet.hr
Eduardo da Silva	Croatia	Dinamo Zagreb	Hajduk Split	3–0	19 May 2007	Sportnet.hr
Ante Rukavina	Croatia	Hajduk Split	Inter Zaprešić	7–1	28 July 2007	Sportnet.hr
Edin Šaranović	Bosnia and Herzegovina	Međimurje	Varteks	4–1	4 August 2007	Sportnet.hr
Vedran Nikšić	Croatia	Osijek	Međimurje	4–0	29 September 2007	Sportnet.hr
Nikola Kalinić	Croatia	Hajduk Split	Zadar	4–1	20 October 2007	Sportnet.hr
Želimir Terkeš	Bosnia and Herzegovina	Zadar	Međimurje	4–0	1 December 2007	Sportnet.hr
Krunoslav Lovrek	Croatia	NK Zagreb	Zadar	7–2	8 December 2007	Sportnet.hr
Senijad Ibričić^{4}	Bosnia and Herzegovina	NK Zagreb	Međimurje	6–1	16 April 2008	Sportnet.hr
Radomir Đalović	Montenegro	Rijeka	Zadar	5–3	16 April 2008	Sportnet.hr
Želimir Terkeš	Bosnia and Herzegovina	Zadar	Rijeka	3–5	16 April 2008	Sportnet.hr
Josip Tadić	Croatia	Dinamo Zagreb	Rijeka	6–1	10 May 2008	Sportnet.hr
Mario Mandžukić	Croatia	Dinamo Zagreb	Cibalia	6–0	17 August 2008	Sportnet.hr
Nikola Kalinić	Croatia	Hajduk Split	Slaven Belupo	3–1	23 August 2008	Sportnet.hr
Ilija Sivonjić	Croatia	Inter Zaprešić	Cibalia	3–4	24 August 2008	Sportnet.hr
Pedro Morales	Chile	Dinamo Zagreb	Croatia Sesvete	6–1	9 November 2008	Sportnet.hr
Ermin Zec	Bosnia and Herzegovina	Šibenik	Inter Zaprešić	4–0	22 March 2009	Sportnet.hr
Miroslav Slepička	Czech Republic	Dinamo Zagreb	Croatia Sesvete	4–0	19 April 2009	Sportnet.hr
Anas Sharbini	Croatia	Rijeka	Slaven Belupo	6–2	26 April 2009	Sportnet.hr
Miroslav Slepička	Czech Republic	Dinamo Zagreb	Varteks	6–1	26 April 2009	Sportnet.hr
Luiz Paulo Hilário	Brazil	Inter Zaprešić	Rijeka	3–0	31 May 2009	Sportnet.hr
Ahmad Sharbini	Croatia	Rijeka	Lokomotiva	6–0	26 July 2009	Sportnet.hr
Anas Sharbini	Croatia	Rijeka	Lokomotiva	6–0	26 July 2009	Sportnet.hr
Sammir	Brazil	Dinamo Zagreb	Osijek	5–0	16 August 2009	Sportnet.hr
Miroslav Šarić	Croatia	Inter Zaprešić	Zadar	4–3	16 October 2009	Sportnet.hr
Davor Vugrinec	Croatia	NK Zagreb	Osijek	3–5	7 November 2009	Sportnet.hr
Mario Mandžukić	Croatia	Dinamo Zagreb	Croatia Sesvete	6–0	27 February 2010	Sportnet.hr
Ante Pokrajčić	Bosnia and Herzegovina	Croatia Sesvete	Inter Zaprešić	3–1	10 April 2010	Sportnet.hr
Vedran Gerc	Croatia	Rijeka	Međimurje	5–1	10 April 2010	Sportnet.hr
Josip Milardović	Croatia	Cibalia	Croatia Sesvete	5–0	8 May 2010	Sportnet.hr
Senijad Ibričić	Bosnia and Herzegovina	Hajduk Split	Croatia Sesvete	5–2	13 May 2010	Sportnet.hr
Mislav Oršić	Croatia	Inter Zaprešić	Lokomotiva	4–2	13 May 2010	Sportnet.hr
Ivan Krstanović	Croatia	NK Zagreb	Rijeka	3–1	26 September 2010	Sportnet.hr
Ivan Santini	Croatia	Zadar	Rijeka	4–4	11 September 2011	Sportnet.hr
Ante Budimir	Croatia	Inter Zaprešić	Zadar	5–1	22 September 2012	Sportnet.hr
Duje Čop	Croatia	Dinamo Zagreb	Rijeka	4–1	17 February 2013	Sportnet.hr
Goran Roce	Croatia	Istra 1961	Osijek	4–0	29 March 2013	Sportnet.hr
Andrej Kramarić	Croatia	Rijeka	Istra 1961	3–3	8 December 2013	Sportnet.hr
Duje Čop	Croatia	Dinamo Zagreb	Slaven Belupo	6–1	8 March 2014	Sportnet.hr
El Arabi Hillel Soudani	Algeria	Dinamo Zagreb	Slaven Belupo	3–0	3 May 2014	Sportnet.hr
Ivan Krstanović	Croatia	Rijeka	Lokomotiva	5–1	10 May 2014	Sportnet.hr
Ante Budimir	Croatia	Lokomotiva	Dinamo Zagreb	3–4	25 July 2014	Sportnet.hr
Andrej Kramarić	Croatia	Rijeka	Hajduk Split	4–2	27 July 2014	Sportnet.hr
Duje Čop	Croatia	Dinamo Zagreb	Zadar	5–0	2 August 2014	Sportnet.hr
Moisés Lima Magalhães	Brazil	Rijeka	Zadar	6–1	31 August 2014	Sportnet.hr
Ángelo Henríquez	Chile	Dinamo Zagreb	Lokomotiva	3–0	5 October 2014	Sportnet.hr
Andrej Kramarić^{5}	Croatia	Rijeka	Lokomotiva	6–0	9 November 2014	Sportnet.hr
Aljoša Vojnović	Croatia	Osijek	NK Zagreb	4–0	1 March 2015	Sportnet.hr
Ivan Krstanović	Croatia	Zadar	Lokomotiva	5–1	3 April 2015	Sportnet.hr
Gabrijel Boban	Croatia	NK Zagreb	Zadar	3–0	29 April 2015	Sportnet.hr
Ángelo Henríquez	Chile	Dinamo Zagreb	RNK Split	5–1	2 May 2015	Sportnet.hr
Ángelo Henríquez	Chile	Dinamo Zagreb	Hajduk Split	4–0	16 May 2015	Sportnet.hr
Armin Hodžić	Bosnia and Herzegovina	Dinamo Zagreb	Inter Zaprešić	5–1	25 July 2015	Sportnet.hr
Ilija Nestorovski	North Macedonia	Inter Zaprešić	NK Zagreb	3–2	26 September 2015	Sportnet.hr
Franko Andrijašević	Croatia	Lokomotiva	Istra 1961	3–0	2 April 2016	Sportnet.hr
Ilija Nestorovski	North Macedonia	Inter Zaprešić	Osijek	4–2	13 May 2016	Sportnet.hr
Héber Araujo dos Santos	Brazil	Slaven Belupo	Cibalia	4–0	18 December 2016	Sportnet.hr
Amer Gojak^{4}	Bosnia and Herzegovina	Dinamo Zagreb	Cibalia	6–0	29 April 2017	Sportnet.hr
Márkó Futács^{4}	Hungary	Hajduk Split	Inter Zaprešić	6–0	20 May 2017	Sportnet.hr
El Arabi Hillel Soudani	Algeria	Dinamo Zagreb	Rijeka	5–2	27 May 2017	
Said Ahmed Said	Italy	Hajduk Split	Rudeš	4–0	20 August 2017	
El Arabi Hillel Soudani	Algeria	Dinamo Zagreb	Lokomotiva	3–0	27 August 2017	
Alexander Gorgon	Austria	Rijeka	Cibalia	7–0	9 September 2017	
Héber Araujo dos Santos	Brazil	Rijeka	Cibalia	5–1	18 March 2018	
Samir Fazli	North Macedonia	Rudeš	Cibalia	3–2	29 April 2018	
Héber Araujo dos Santos	Brazil	Rijeka	Istra 1961	3–3	26 August 2018	
Lirim Kastrati	Kosovo	Lokomotiva	Slaven Belupo	5–2	16 September 2018	
Mirko Marić	Croatia	Osijek	Inter Zaprešić	6–0	16 December 2018	
Mislav Oršić	Croatia	Dinamo Zagreb	Rudeš	7–2	2 February 2019	
Jakov Puljić^{4}	Croatia	Rijeka	Inter Zaprešić	7–0	13 April 2019	
Mijo Caktaš	Croatia	Hajduk Split	Rudeš	4–1	14 May 2019	
Mario Ćuže	Croatia	Istra 1961	Varaždin	3–1	3 August 2019	
Kristijan Lovrić	Croatia	Gorica	Varaždin	3–1	1 September 2019	
Mislav Oršić	Croatia	Dinamo Zagreb	Gorica	4–2	18 October 2019	
Serder Serderov	Russia	Inter Zaprešić	Osijek	3–3	20 October 2019	
Marko Tolić	Croatia	Lokomotiva	Inter Zaprešić	3–1	9 November 2019	
Mislav Oršić	Croatia	Dinamo Zagreb	Rijeka	5–0	10 November 2019	
Antonio Čolak^{4}	Croatia	Rijeka	Istra 1961	4–2	25 July 2020	
Mario Gavranović	Switzerland	Dinamo Zagreb	Gorica	3–2	17 October 2020	
Deni Juric	Australia	Šibenik	Varaždin	3–1	7 November 2020	
Mario Gavranović	Switzerland	Dinamo Zagreb	Gorica	3–0	16 May 2021	
Marko Livaja	Croatia	Hajduk Split	Istra 1961	3–1	12 September 2021	
Robert Murić	Croatia	Rijeka	Hrvatski Dragovoljac	4–1	4 December 2021	
Marko Livaja	Croatia	Hajduk Split	Hrvatski Dragovoljac	3–0	19 February 2022	
Josip Drmić	Switzerland	Rijeka	Šibenik	5–3	30 April 2022	
Mijo Caktaš	Croatia	Osijek	Slaven Belupo	4–0	9 October 2022	
Mijo Caktaš	Croatia	Osijek	Rudeš	4–3	30 July 2023	
Josip Drmić	Switzerland	Dinamo Zagreb	Rudeš	5–1	24 September 2023	
Vedran Jugović	Croatia	Osijek	Istra 1961	3–1	28 October 2023	
Duje Čop	Croatia	Lokomotiva	Dinamo Zagreb	3–0	23 January 2024	
Veldin Hodža	Croatia	Rijeka	Osijek	3–0	10 March 2024	
Ramón Miérez	Argentina	Osijek	Gorica	3–0	28 April 2024	
Aleksandar Trajkovski	North Macedonia	Hajduk Split	Lokomotiva	5–2	25 May 2024	
Niko Janković	Croatia	Rijeka	Slaven Belupo	4–0	26 May 2024	Sportnet.hr
Robert Mudražija	Croatia	Lokomotiva	Gorica	4–1	21 December 2024	Sportnet.hr
Nail Omerović	Bosnia and Herzegovina	Osijek	Vukovar 1991	4–0	14 September 2025	Sportnet.hr
Toni Fruk	Croatia	Rijeka	Hajduk Split	5–0	22 November 2025	Sportnet.hr
Smail Prevljak	Bosnia and Herzegovina	Istra 1961	Osijek	5–1	7 December 2025	Sportnet.hr
Dion Drena Beljo	Croatia	Dinamo Zagreb	Slaven Belupo	4–2	14 March 2026	Sportnet.hr
Dion Drena Beljo	Croatia	Dinamo Zagreb	Lokomotiva	5–0	21 March 2026	Sportnet.hr
Bruno Bogojević	Croatia	Gorica	Rijeka	4–0	22 March 2026	Sportnet.hr
Dion Drena Beljo	Croatia	Dinamo Zagreb	Vukovar 1991	4–1	13 April 2026	Sportnet.hr
Nail Omerović	Bosnia and Herzegovina	Osijek	Rudeš	6–1	8 August 2026	Sportnet.hr
Emil Frederiksen	Denmark	Istra 1961	Rudeš	3–2	13 September 2026	Sportnet.hr

== Multiple hat-tricks ==
The following table lists the number of hat-tricks scored by players who have scored three or more hat-tricks.

Rank	Player	Hat-tricks
1st	(Croatia) Igor Cvitanović	6
1st	(Croatia) Igor Pamić	6
1st	(Croatia) Goran Vlaović	6
1st	(Croatia) Davor Vugrinec	6
5th	(Croatia) Tomislav Erceg	4
5th	(Croatia) Mislav Oršić	4
5th	(Croatia) Ahmad Sharbini	4
8th	(Croatia) Dion Drena Beljo	3
8th	(Croatia) Mijo Caktaš	3
8th	(Croatia) Duje Čop	3
8th	(Bosnia and Herzegovina) Marijo Dodik	3
8th	(Brazil) Héber	3
8th	(Chile) Ángelo Henríquez	3
8th	(Croatia) Andrej Kramarić	3
8th	(Croatia) Ivan Krstanović	3
8th	(Croatia) Alen Peternac	3
8th	(Croatia) Joško Popović	3
8th	(Croatia) Eduardo da Silva	3
8th	(Algeria) El Arabi Hillel Soudani	3
8th	(Croatia) Zoran Zekić	3
