= Armando Marenzi =

Croatian football manager and former player (born 1966)

Personal information
- Date of birth: 16 March 1966 (age 60)
- Place of birth: Šibenik, SFR Yugoslavia
- Position: Midfielder

Youth career
- –1985: Šibenik

Senior career*
Years	Team	Apps	(Gls)
1985–1986	Šibenik	63	(19)
1987–1988	Spartak Subotica	40	(12)
1989–1991	Šibenik	54	(11)
1992–1994	Olympique Avignonnais	45	(11)
1994–1996	Panargiakos	60	(17)
1996–1997	Panserraikos	15	(4)
1998–2001	Šibenik	80	(10)
2001–2003	Zrinjski Mostar	73	(21)
Total		437	(113)

Managerial career
- 2008–2010: Primorac Biograd
- 2011–2016: Hajduk Split (youth)
- 2018–2020: RNK Split
- 2022–2024: Al Wasl U17
- 2025–2026: HNK Zadar
- * Club domestic league appearances and goals

Armando Marenzi (born 16 March 1966) is a Croatian professional football manager and former player.

== Playing career ==
Marenzi started his career in hometown club Šibenik, where he played for 25 years, including his youth career. In 1988, he moved to Spartak Subotica where he made his debut in the Yugoslav First League. However during the season's winter break, Marenzi returned to Šibenik playing back then in the Second League all the way until 1992, after which the club became part of the newly formed Croatian Prva HNL. In 1992, he joined France's Ligue 2, playing two years for Avignon, but after went to the Greek second division, signing with Panargiakos during the 1994–95 and 1995–96 seasons. In 1996, Marenzi joined Greek first division club Panserraikos.

At the age of 32, he returned to Šibenik to play in the Prva HNL. In December 2001, Marenzi moved to Zrinjski Mostar. He ended his career at Zrinjski in 2003.

== Managerial career ==
=== Early career ===
After finishing his playing career, Marenzi committed himself to a managerial career. He has an UEFA Pro Licence.

=== Hajduk Split ===
Marenzi was hired by Hajduk Split in August 2011 to be the manager of the U11 team. In December 2012, he was the manager of the U15 team, then in 2015 of the U19 team, while in 2016, Marenzi became the first-team assistant manager to Hari Vukas.

=== RNK Split ===
In April 2018, Marenzi was named as the new manager of Croatian Second League club RNK Split.

=== Željezničar ===
On 18 June 2021, Tomislav Ivković became the new manager of Bosnian Premier League club Željezničar, with Marenzi being announced as his assistant.

=== Borac Banja Luka ===
In December 2021, Tomislav Ivković left Željezničar and later, in January 2022, became the new sporting director of Borac Banja Luka, while Marenzi also left Željezničar and joined Borac as a coach.

=== Al-Wasl Dubai ===
In August 2022, Marenzi became the new manager of the under-17 team of Al Wasl.
