= Domagoj Torbarina =

Croatian footballer

Personal information
- Full name: Domagoj Torbarina
- Date of birth: 1 April 1992 (age 34)
- Place of birth: Zagreb, Croatia
- Height: 1.90 m (6 ft 3 in)
- Position: Defender

Team information
- Current team: Primorac Biograd

Youth career
- NK Zadar

Senior career*
Years	Team	Apps	(Gls)
2010-2011	Zadar	1	(0)
2011-2012	Raštane	15	(1)
2011-2012	Gorica	20	(0)
2012-2013	Primorac Biograd	11	(1)
2013	RM Hamm Benfica	0	(0)
2014-2015	GOŠK Dubrovnik		
2015	Zmaj Blato		
2016-2021	GOŠK Dubrovnik		
2021-2022	HV Posedarje		
2022	Primorac Biograd		

International career
	Croatia U19	10	(0)
- * Club domestic league appearances and goals

Domagoj Torbarina (born 1 April 1992 in Zagreb, Croatia) is a Croatian footballer.

== Career ==
Domagoj made his professional debut for NK Zadar in the Croatian 1st division. After, he played for NK Rastane and HNK Gorica in the Croatian 2nd division and Primorac Biograd in Croatian third league.

In July 2013 Domagoj transferred to Hamm Benfica.
