= Butić =

Butić is a Croatian or Serbian (Бутић) surname. Notable people with the surname include:

- Josip Butić (born 1974), Croatian football midfielder and manager
- Karlo Butić (born 1998), Croatian football forward
