= Marin Prpić =

Croatian footballer

Personal information
- Full name: Marin Prpić
- Date of birth: 8 December 1976 (age 49)
- Place of birth: Rijeka, SFR Yugoslavia
- Position: Midfielder

Senior career*
Years	Team	Apps	(Gls)
1993–1998	Orijent		
1998–2000	Zadar		(13)
2000–2003	Pomorac		
2003–2004	Zadar	29	(6)
2004	Rijeka	1	(0)
2004–2005	Zadar	27	(3)
2005–2006	Rijeka	8	(3)
2006	→ Segesta (loan)	11	(1)
2006–2007	Pomorac	29	(6)
2007–2009	Karlovac	53	(15)
2009–2013	Pomorac	99	(9)
2013–2014	Krk	28	(8)
- * Club domestic league appearances and goals

Marin Prpić (born 8 December 1976 in Rijeka) is a retired Croatian football player who played for Orijent, Zadar, Pomorac and Rijeka in the Croatian First Football League. He also played for several clubs in the Croatian second and third divisions.

Prpić scored a hat-trick for Rijeka in a 4–1 win over Cibalia on 30 July 2005. With 10 goals to his account, he was also the top-scorer for Pomorac during the 2001–02 Croatian First Football League season.
