= Amarildo Zela =

Albanian footballer (born 1972)

Personal information
- Date of birth: 25 August 1972 (age 54)
- Place of birth: Tirana, Albania
- Height: 1.83 m (6 ft 0 in)
- Position: Midfielder

Team information
- Current team: SG Waidhofen/Ybbs (Head coach)

Senior career*
| Years | Team | Apps | (Gls) |
| 1991–1993 | Partizani | 26 | (1) |
| 1993 | VfL Osnabrück | | |
| 1993–1995 | Tirana | 17 | (2) |
| 1995–1996 | Neretva Metković | 28 | (8) |
| 1996 | Šibenik | 1 | (0) |
| 1996–1997 | Marsonia | 25 | (4) |
| 1997–2000 | Vukovar '91 | 28 | (10) |
| 2000 | Hapoel Be'er Sheva | | |
| 2001 | Hapoel Jerusalem | | |
| 2001 | Partizani | 2 | (0) |
| 2002 | Kamen Ingrad | 11 | (3) |
| 2002 | NK Čakovec | | |
| 2003–2004 | DSV Leoben | 28 | (3) |
| 2004–2005 | Vorwärts Steyr | | |
| 2005–2006 | Blau-Weiß Linz | | |
| 2006–2009 | Vorwärts Steyr | | |
| 2010–2011 | Union Weißkirchen | | |
| 2011 | ASKÖ Leonding | | |
| 2017 | ASV Kleinreifling | | |
| 2018 | SG Grossreifling | | |
| 2019 | FCU Mayr Bau Ertl | | |

International career
| 1992–1997 | Albania | 2 | (0) |

Managerial career
- 2009–2010: Vorwärts Steyr II (player-manager)
- 2011–2012: Union Pregarten
- 2012–2013: WSC Hertha Wels
- 2014–2015: Vorwärts Steyr II (player-manager)
- 2016–2017: TuS Kremsmünster
- 2017–2019: ASKÖ Schwertberg
- 2019: FC Wels
- 2020–: SG Waidhofen/Ybbs
- * Club domestic league appearances and goals

Amarildo Zela (born 25 August 1972) is an Albanian football manager and former player who is head coach of SG Waidhofen/Ybbs. An attacking midfielder, he played two games for the Albania national team in 1992 and in 1997.

== Club career ==
Zela was born in Tirana. He played in five different countries through his career, and playing for 14 different teams in the process. He started his footballing career with KF Partizani Tirana before moving to Germany with Oberliga Nord side VfL Osnabrück. His first experience abroad was only a short one as he only spent six months at the club before moving back to Albania with SK Tirana in January 1994. After a season and a half back in Albania Zela decided to move to Croatia and the 1.HNL for the first time with NK Neretva Metković. Zela then moved to HNK Šibenik the next season where he teamed up with former Partizani teammate Ylli Shehu. It took just six months before his next move, this time i was to another Croatian club NK Vukovar '91 During his time with NK Vukovar Zela won promotion twice and teamed up with fellow Albanian Fatmir Vata for the 1999–2000 season after they were promoted to the top division in Croatia. He scored ten goals that season in the 1.HNL. After five seasons and four clubs in Croatia, Zela moved to Israel with second-tier side Hapoel Jerusalem F.C.

== International career ==
Zela made his debut for Albania in a May 1992 FIFA World Cup qualification match away against the Republic of Ireland and earned a total of two caps, scoring no goals. His other international game was a June 1997 World Cup qualification match against Portugal.

== Managerial and later career ==
After three championship titles, 110 championship appearances and 101 goals for Vorwärts Steyr, Zela hung up his boots and became manager for the club's reserve team for the 2009–2010 season. However, he returned to the pitch for the upcoming season, signing with Austrian club Union Weißkirchen and then ASKÖ Leonding in the summer 2011 at the age of 38. However, only one month later, he became manager of Union Pregarten.

On 25 September 2012, Zela was appointed manager of WSC Hertha Wels. In the summer 2014, Zela returned SK Vorwärts Steyr, once again as a player-manager for the club's reserve team.

In May 2017, 44-year-old Zela made comeback at the pitch for ASV Kleinreifling. Zela became in charge of Austrian lower league side ASKÖ Steinbach Schwertberg in 2017 but left the club in July 2019. He then took the reins at FC Wels.

In the summer 2020, Zela became the head coach of SG Waidhofen/Ybbs.

== Honours ==
- Albanian Superliga: 1993, 1995
