= Zvonimir Jurić (footballer) =

Croatian footballer and coach

Personal information
- Date of birth: 10 April 1976 (age 50)
- Place of birth: Zadar, SFR Yugoslavia
- Height: 1.80 m (5 ft 11 in)
- Position: Defender

Team information
- Current team: HNK Zadar (assistant manager)

Youth career
- –1993: NK Zadar

Senior career*
Years	Team	Apps	(Gls)
1993–2006	Zadar	304	(3)

Managerial career
- 2020–: HNK Zadar (assistant)
- * Club domestic league appearances and goals

Zvonimir Jurić (born 10 April 1976) is a Croatian retired footballer who spent his whole career playing for NK Zadar. He is currently working as assistant manager of HNK Zadar.

== Career statistics ==
Performances in Prva HNL
Season	Apps	Goals
1993–94	2	0
1994–95	9	0
1995–96	29	0
1996–97	24	0
1997–98	8	0
1998–99	26	0
2001–02	28	2
2002–03	25	0
2003–04	28	1
2004–05	27	0
Total	206	3
