= Marko Kartelo =

Croatian footballer and manager

Personal information
- Date of birth: 16 February 1981 (age 45)
- Place of birth: Šibenik, SR Croatia, Yugoslavia
- Height: 1.80 m (5 ft 11 in)
- Position: Defender

Team information
- Current team: Šibenik (manager)

Youth career
- Šibenik

Senior career*
Years	Team	Apps	(Gls)
1998–2002	Šibenik	53	(3)
2002–2005	Győri ETO	48	(5)
2005–2007	Šibenik	49	(14)
2007–2010	NK Zagreb	68	(6)
2010–2012	Šibenik	37	(3)
2012	Hapoel Haifa	0	(0)
2012	Primorac	4	(2)
2013–2015	Šibenik	2	(1)
2015–2016	SV 1910 Neuhof		

International career
1998–1999	Croatia U17	10	(1)
1999	Croatia U18	2	(0)
2000–2001	Croatia U20	6	(0)
2002	Croatia U21	3	(0)

Managerial career
- 2019–2020: NK Vodice
- 2022: Šibenik (assistant)
- 2022: Šibenik (interim)
- 2022: Šibenik
- 2024–: Šibenik
- * Club domestic league appearances and goals

Marko Kartelo (born 16 February 1981) is a Croatian professional football manager and former player who is currently the manager of Croatian Football League club HNK Šibenik.

== Playing career ==
In January 2012, Kartelo terminated his contract with Šibenik through arbitration. In February 2012 he signed a sixth-month contract with Israeli club Hapoel Haifa. He later had a spell at German lower league side SV 1910 Neuhof.

== Managerial career ==
Kartelo started his managerial career being appointed head coach of Treća HNL club NK Vodice on 11 November 2019. On 2 January 2020, he was fired from the club and replaced by Boris Pavić.

On 12 February 2022 following the sacking of Ferdo Milin after 0–5 home defeat to Hrvatski Dragovoljac, Kartelo was appointed caretaker manager of Prva HNL club HNK Šibenik. On 20 February, he led his first game as Šibenik manager, which the club lost to Rijeka 2–4. On 27 February, Kartelo led Šibenik to a 2–1 home win against Istra 1961.

On 3 March 2022, Šibenik confirmed that Kartelo would remain the head coach as a long-time solution. A day later, just a day before the league game against Dinamo Zagreb, Kartelo was sacked as the head coach by the club.

== Managerial statistics ==
As of match played 27 February 2022

Managerial record by team and tenure
Team	From	To	Record							
Team	From	To	G	W	D	L	GF	GA	GD	Win %
Šibenik	12 February 2022	4 March 2022	2	1	0	1	4	5	−1	50.00
Total			2	1	0	1	4	5	−1	50.00
