= Goran Tomić =

Croatian footballer and manager

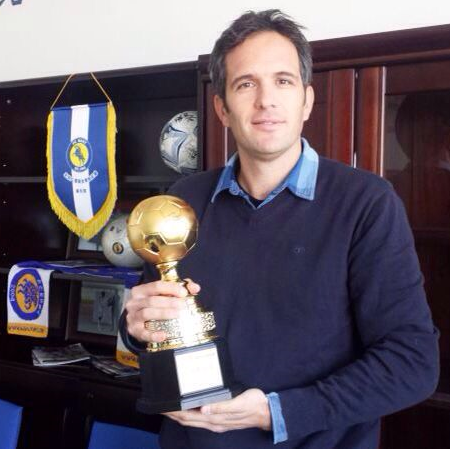
- Tomić in 2015

Personal information
- Date of birth: 18 March 1977 (age 49)
- Place of birth: Šibenik, SR Croatia, SFR Yugoslavia
- Height: 1.90 m (6 ft 3 in)
- Position: Forward

Team information
- Current team: Al-Khaldiya (head coach)

Youth career
- Šibenik

Senior career*
Years	Team	Apps	(Gls)
1994–1997	Šibenik	44	(6)
1997–2001	Vicenza	6	(0)
1998	→ AEK Athens (loan)	12	(2)
1998–1999	→ Reggina (loan)	23	(3)
2001–2005	FC Salzburg	64	(19)
2005–2006	Lierse SK	1	(0)
2006	Henan Construction	4	(0)
Total		154	(30)

International career
1997	Croatia U21	11	(1)

Managerial career
- 2011–2013: Šibenik
- 2013–2015: Beijing Baxy
- 2015: Tianjin Songjiang
- 2016: Zhejiang Yiteng
- 2016: Šibenik (interim)
- 2016: Istra 1961
- 2016–2017: Shenzhen (assistant)
- 2017–2021: Lokomotiva
- 2021–2022: Rijeka
- 2022–2023: Al Nasr
- 2024–2025: Al Bataeh
- 2025: Istra 1961
- 2026–: Al-Khaldiya
- * Club domestic league appearances and goals

Goran Tomić (pronounced [ɡǒran tômitɕ, - tǒː-]; born 18 March 1977) is a Croatian professional football manager and former player who is the head coach of Bahraini Premier League club Al-Khaldiya.

He started his managerial career with his hometown club HNK Šibenik in the Croatian Prva HNL in 2011. His previous managerial successes came while at Lokomotiva between 2017 and 2021 and Rijeka between 2021 and 2022.

== Club career ==
Tomić started his professional football career at his hometown club HNK Šibenik in the Croatian Prva HNL where he grew up no more than 50 meters away from the Šubićevac Stadium. He progressed through all the age groups within the club before finally breaking into the first team in 1994. In 1997 he moved to Vicenza which paid €700,000 for his services. He played just under 30 games in Serie A for both Reggina and Vicenza scoring three goals in the process. On 3 February 1998 Tomić was loaned to the Greek side AEK Athens for a fee of 80 million drachmas. His most successful spell was between 2001 and 2005 in the Austrian Bundesliga, playing over 60 times for FC Salzburg scoring 19 goals. He had a rather short and forgettable stint with Lierse S.K. in Belgium, before ending his career in 2006 due to a lingering foot injury, after a short spell with Chinese League One club Henan Construction.

== Managerial career ==
=== Šibenik ===
Following his retirement as a player, Tomić was first appointed as head coach of the HNK Šibenik under-19 team in September 2009. One year later he moved into the role of first team assistant manager. On 1 September 2011, Vjekoslav Lokica departed the club and Tomić realized a boyhood dream, being appointed as the new manager of the club.

Following Tomić's inaugural season with the club, 2011–12, Šibenik were relegated to second-tier Druga HNL due to serious financial problems. On 12 February 2013, Tomić resigned from the club after accepting a three-year contract to take up a position in China.

=== Beijing Baxy ===
Chinese League One side Beijing Baxy had just been relegated with 31 points, losing half of their fixtures and finishing 15th of 16 teams. However, due to the merge of Chinese Super League sides Dalian Shide and Dalian Aerbin, they were spared from relegation to the third tier in order to preserve the integrity and stability of the Chinese Leagues. On 26 February 2013, Tomić was officially announced as the new manager of Beijing Baxy.

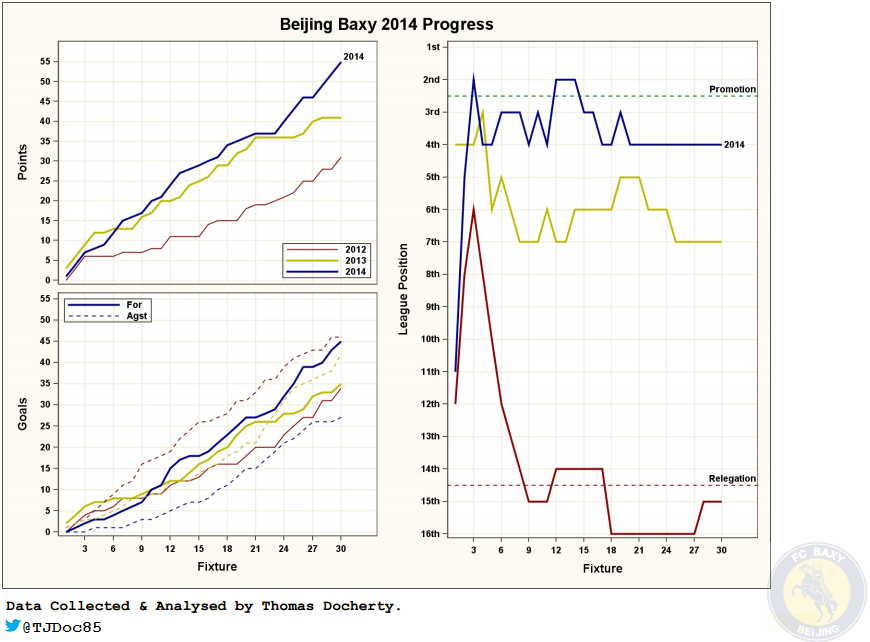
Beijing Baxy 3-year progress (2012–14): Tomić was in charge for both the 2013 & 2014 seasons

During the 2013 season, Baxy were widely expected to struggle, the aim of the season was to steady the ship and avoid relegation. Although the core of the side relegated in 2012 remained, marquee signings came in the form of Ryan Griffiths and Lucian Goian, whilst fellow Croatian Antonio Cinotti was added to the backroom staff. Tomić managed to guide Baxy not only clear of relegation but to the highest place finish in the club's history, finishing in a very respectable 7th position (P30, W11, D8, L11 – 41 pts).

The aim for the 2014 season was to improve on 2013 by finishing in the top 6 and in preparation for this Tomić drafted in Ivica Matas to join his backroom staff. Baxy also proudly announced the news of four signings from Super League teams whom joined up with the squad for pre-season training in South Korea. Shortly after returning to China however all four players had returned to their original clubs, and with other first team players also leaving in the off season, including Ryan Griffiths, preparations for the new season were plunged into crisis as the squad was left threadbare.

Despite these challenges during pre-season, having less preparation time relative to other teams in the league, Baxy consistently performed above all expectations. An unprecedented run of 22 games undefeated meant that Baxy were being touted as serious contenders for promotion to the Super League. Tomić had found a blend of foreign aid and Chinese talent meaning they were fighting for promotion all the way to the final day of the season. Eventually finishing in 4th position (P30, W14, D13, L3 – 55 pts), for the second straight year they had the highest classification in the club's history.

For his achievements in 2014, Tomić won the Chinese League One Coach of the Year award, receiving nearly 60% of the entire voting whilst Baxy also had two players elected into the Team of the Year.

Beijing Baxy's continual progression and improvement under Tomić was well noted within China. The club drew new investment from both Yanjing Beer and the Beijing Enterprises Group, promising funds to help turn Baxy into a team competing for continental prizes. Beijing Enterprises Group completed the take over of Beijing Baxy at the end of the 2014 season. Along with a new name, new crest and new club colours, came the decision to opt for a new, higher profile coach. Tomić left Beijing Baxy in January 2015.

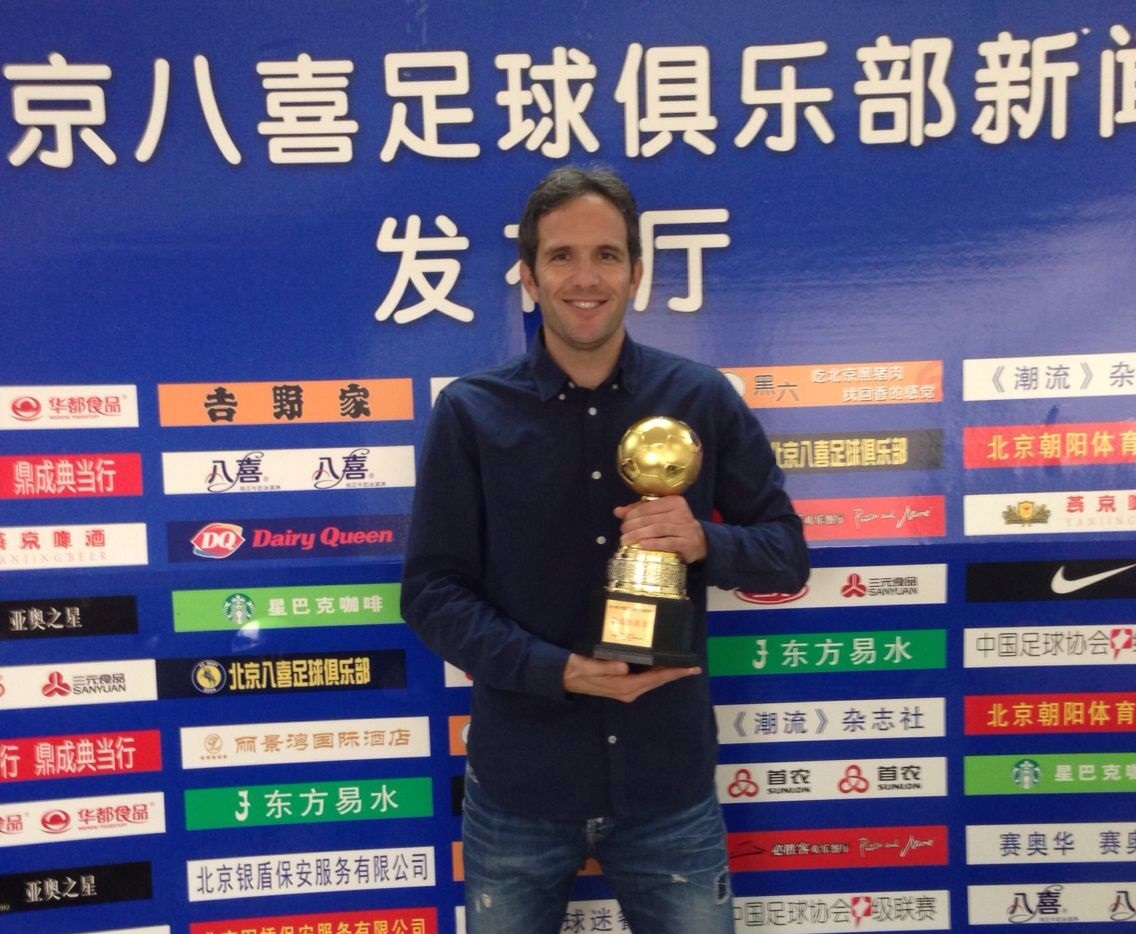
Tomić with Beijing Baxy in 2015

=== Tianjin Songjiang ===
Tomić took charge of Tianjin Songjiang on 11 May 2015, with the club rooted to the foot of the Chinese League One table after only picking up 4 points from 8 games.

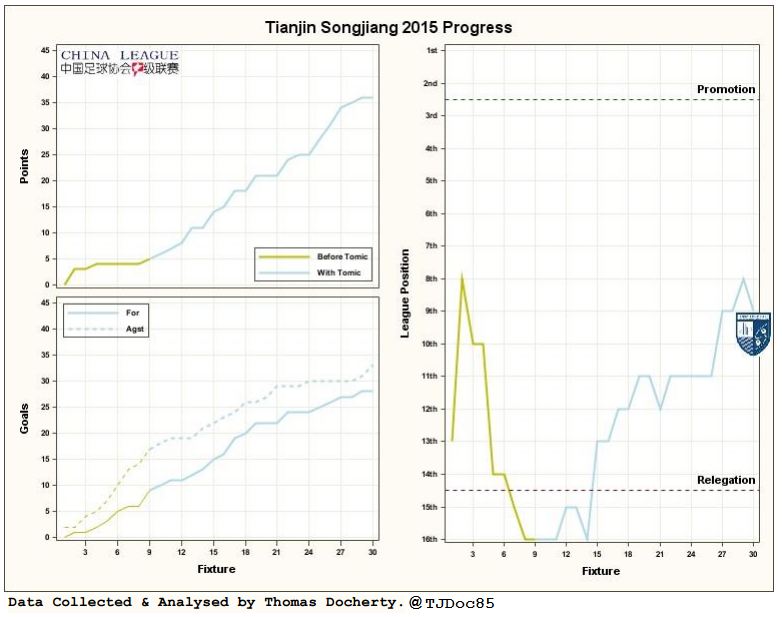
Tianjin Songjiang 2015 progress under Tomić

His arrival had an instant impact, as in the first 9 games in charge the team went on an impressive 5 game unbeaten run and lost only once (in controversial circumstances to Xinjiang). With the leaky defence beginning to seal its holes, Tomić turned his focus to finding an improved attacking threat. He successfully tempted former England under-19 and Coventry City striker Frank Nouble to join the ranks, somewhat of a coup for a Chinese League One side. Nouble formed a nice partnership with Mario Lucio and the pair sparked another good run, picking up 10 points in 5 games including victories over much stronger opposition in Dalian (4th), Qingdao Jonoon (2nd) and a very meaningful point against Tomić's former employers Beijing BG.

This inspiring haul of points was enough to claw themselves comfortably out of the relegation zone and with the attention from the local media looking on, the focus of the team soon switched from looking over their shoulder at a relegation battle, to a push for a top half finish.

Tomić's success in Songjiang had also caught the attention of the Quanjian Natural Medicine Group, whose major sponsorship deal with Songjiang's larger footballing brother Tianjin TEDA had just broken down. The ambition of Quanjian to remain involved in Tianjin sport and the improved position of Tianjin Songjiang under Tomić led to Quanjian completing a takeover of Tianjin Songjiang for the 2016 season.

Tianjin continued to progress in the league standings with the club integrating more young Chinese players, ready for the 2016 season. The absence of its foreign aid stalled the charge, Tianjin ended the 2015 season in a ninth position and were notably the only team to beat the league champions, Yanbian, in an away match during that season.

With the takeover confirmed, Tomić once again had to endure the consequence of his own success. The new owners promised an increased transfer budget, and stated their ambition of promotion in 2016, by bringing in their own personnel. Just like in Beijing, Tomić was to be replaced as manager, this time by former Real Madrid and Brazil coach, Vanderlei Luxemburgo, but not before the club issued a very complimentary press release. The club stated they were extremely grateful for Tomić's efforts in turning the club around and preventing its relegation, in a period of just 150 days. It went on to state that no matter which direction the club would take in the future, it would never forget Tomić's contribution in 2015.

=== Zhejiang Yiteng ===
Having cemented his reputation in China, Tomić continued his managerial reign in the country, signing a deal to take charge of Chinese League One side Zhejiang Yiteng on 10 January 2016. However, on 22 March the same year, after only two games in charge, Zhejiang Yiteng announced that for personal reasons, Tomić would leave the club by mutual consent.

=== Temporary return to Šibenik ===
Tomić returned home as a spectator to watch Šibenik in the final game of the 2015–16 Croatian Second League regular season, with Šibenik needed a win against leaders Cibalia to secure direct promotion to the first tier. The game finished 0–0 and Šibenik would need to attempt to gain promotion via the playoff route. Whilst leaving the stadium, Šibenik approached Tomić with a request that he considers taking the position to lead the team during the 10-day playoff period. Tomić accepted the opportunity to act as Šibenik caretaker manager, and is quoted as saying "I could not refuse this club".

The opponents in the playoffs were 9th placed Prva HNL club Istra 1961. Šibenik was at home for the 1st leg and contrary to expectation had both the majority of possession and created more goal scoring opportunities than their higher tiered counterparts. Despite this Istra took an early second half lead, though an 87th-minute equaliser set up a tasty second leg.

The second leg was a tight and nervy game with hardly anything to separate the two sides. Šibenik held a lead for all of 2 minutes before being pegged back. The tie finished 1–1 after extra time, 2–2 on aggregate and ended in the lottery of a penalty shootout. Tomić's side, despite a heroic effort to upset the odds, suffered a heart breaking 5–4 defeat on penalties.

=== Istra 1961 ===
Impressed by the progress shown at Šibenik during the playoffs, Istra 1961 approached Tomić to employ his services as manager for the 2016–17 season. On 22 July 2016, Tomić took charge of the club.

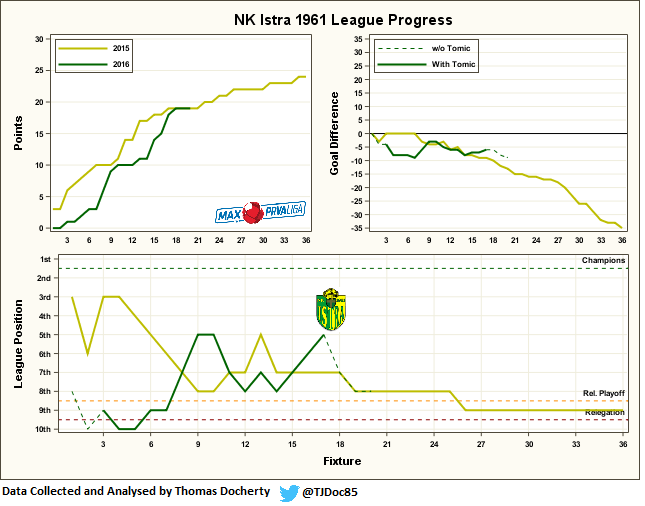
Istra 1961 league progress; 2015 through 2016

At the time of being appointed, Istra 1961 was on run that was not just a downward spiral, they were in free fall. Experiencing a run lasting more than 10 months and consisting of 28 consecutive competitive fixtures without a win. During this period they managed to find the net only 11 times, whilst conceding 46. The expectation then for the 2016–17 season was simple, avoid relegation.

Tomić started his reign with three draws in the first four games, immediately stopping the run of seven consecutive competitive defeats prior to his arrival, laying solid foundations to build upon. Building which began with a couple of shrewd attacking additions in the form of Brazilian Mário Lúcio and Nigerian Theophilus Solomon, both of whom had worked under Tomić previously.

Games that Istra 1961 would perhaps have previously lost, were now being turned into draws and points were being picked up. Even the narrow 1–2 defeat to the higher ranked giant of Dinamo Zagreb showed that progress was being made. The win-less streak was finally snapped with two widely convincing league wins (3–0, 4–1) on the spin.

With the steady progress being made in Croatia, his reputation in China and Chinese clubs preparing for the start of their new 2017 season, it was perhaps expected then that offers from Chinese clubs began to come in. These were regularly turned down by Tomić opting to stay with NK Istra to continue what was turning into a good season. However one phone call with an offer "too good to refuse" would change Tomić's career path. The legendary Sven-Göran Eriksson had offered assistant manager position to Tomić at Shenzhen FC.

Comparing Tomić's 15 league games in charge with the same time period prior to his arrival shows marked progress. Prior to his arrival, Istra 1961 had an average goal difference of -1.54 per game, picking up an average of 0.26 points per game. Contrasting this under Tomić's leadership, the average goal difference improved to -0.14 (+1.40) and the points per game increased to 1.20 (+0.94).

Tomić left Istra 1961 sitting in fifth place of the Prva HNL with a squad of players in a strong position to achieve its goal of avoiding relegation. Istra 1961 eventually secured a 6th-place finish, although did see a small drop in performance after Tomić departed, averaging 0.1 points per game less than when Tomić was in charge (1.1 v. 1.2).

=== Shenzhen FC ===
On 5 December 2016, Sven-Göran Eriksson appointed Tomić as his assistant manager at Chinese League One side Shenzhen FC as they embarked on the challenge following the outgoing Clarence Seedorf.

Shenzhen were largely tipped for promotion in 2017, and the pre-season marquee signings of Harold Preciado and Chinedu Obasi helped fire Shenzhen straight to the top of the league. An opening day 6–0 victory against Dalian Transcendence and a procession of 5 straight wins (outscoring opponents 18-5 in the process), had all the hallmarks of a positive season ahead. However the side drew 5 and lost 3 in the next 8 games and with the early season baseline being set so high, Shenzhen decided to part ways with Sven and his backroom staff, leaving the club in 4th place after 13 games.

=== Lokomotiva ===
On 27 December 2017, Tomić signed with Croatian First League side NK Lokomotiva to be the club's manager.

Tomić mastered arguably the shock of the 2017–18 season with a 4–1 away victory at league leaders Dinamo Zagreb, becoming the first manager in the club's history to achieve this feat. Prior to this occasion, Lokomotiva had met their Zagreb brothers 27 times competitively, losing in 26 of those encounters. Tomić also went on to guide his young Lokomotiva side to a semi-final appearance in the Croatian Cup, eventually losing on penalties after a 1–1 draw with Hajduk Split. Lokomotiva topped the form table as the 17/18 season came to a conclusion, going undefeated in their last 8, which included victories over the top two Rijeka and Dinamo Zagreb for a second time during the campaign. Acknowledgement of Tomić's achievements that season came in the form of his nomination by the Croatian Football Federation for Croatian Manager of the Year.

On 25 July 2020 defeating Osijek 2–1, Lokomotiva achieved the biggest success in its history so far, coming in second in the 2019–20 national league championship. Finishing in second place in the national league championship, Lokomotiva drew Rapid Wien in the 2020–21 UEFA Champions League second qualifying round but lost from them at home on 26 August (0–1).

Tomić left Lokomotiva on 9 January 2021.

=== Rijeka ===
On 1 March 2021, Tomić was appointed as the new manager of HNK Rijeka, replacing Simon Rožman. Two days later, in his debut, he led Rijeka to a 2–1 victory over Osijek in the Croatian Cup quarter-final. Having taken charge midway through the 2020/21 season, Rijeka were stranded 14 points behind HNK Gorica in 3rd place. Goran guided his new team to 8 wins in their next 13 games to sit just one point behind Gorica on the final day of the season. Incredibly the final day saw Rijeka and Gorica go head to head in a tense affair. Rijeka sealed a 2-1 victory late in the second half with a goal from Luka Menalo, stealing 3rd place in the league and clinching a place in the 2021/22 UEFA Conference Qualifiers as their reward.

The early part of the 2021/22 season saw moderate continental success, with Rijeka travelling to Malta and Scotland in the UEFA Conference Qualifiers, beating Gzira United and Hibernian, 3-0 and 5-2 agg., before succumbing to Greek side PAOK in the 3rd Qualifying Round 1-3 agg. Goran guided Rijeka to domestic cup competition success, reaching the Croatian Cup Final for the second time in his career, beating Dinamo Zagreb once more (3-1) along the way. The league performance in the HNL 1 was equally, if not more impressive, sitting continuously inside the top 4 from game week 7. These achievements, amongst others, were later recognised by his peers as he was voted the 2021/22 Croatian Manager of the Year.

Tomić left Rijeka on 27 May 2022.

=== Al Nasr SC ===
On 5 November 2022, Tomić was appointed as the new manager of Al-Nasr SC (Dubai), replacing Thorsten Fink. Al-Nasr was facing a relegation battle, having picked up only 6 points in their opening 9 games.

Even with no recognised forward to call upon, the teams overall performance saw a marked improvement during Tomić's tenure. The rate of goals scored and conceded both improved and unexpected victories were achieved against Al-Sharjah and Al-Ain (twice) which helped earn a nomination for the March Manager of the Month award. Most importantly however, the points per game significantly increased (from 0.67 to 1.24) and Tomić guided Al-Nasr to finish the season 9th, comfortably safe from relegation.

There was modest success in the domestic cups, most notably reaching the semi-final of the Pro-League Cup. From the players' perspective, Adel Taarabt in particular flourished under Tomić, notching 11 goals in 23 games played.

Tomić left Al-Nasr on 24 May 2023.

=== Al Bataeh ===
On 6 January 2024, Tomić was appointed as the new manager of Al Bataeh, replacing Mirel Radoi. At the time of taking over Al Bataeh were midtable (7th) in the UAE Pro League, with half of the season remaining. Al Bataeh would go on to record the highest finishing position in the clubs history, placing 7th with 37 points. Goran was nominated for the 2023/24 UAE Pro League Coach of the Year.

Tomić left Al-Bataeh on 8 January 2025 by mutual consent.

=== Return to NK Istra 1961 ===
On 13 June 2025, Tomić was appointed as the new manager of NK Istra 1961, replacing Gonzalo García. Tomić left Istra on 13 September 2025.

=== Al-Khaldiya ===
In August 2026, Tomić was named the head coach of Bahraini Premier League club Al-Khaldiya.

== Managerial statistics ==
As of match played 18 October 2026

Club	Nat	From	To	Record							
Club	Nat	From	To	P	W	D	L	GF	GA	+/-	Win %
Šibenik	(Croatia)	1 September 2011	12 February 2013	41	12	14	15	43	48	−5	29.27
Beijing Baxy	(China)	26 February 2013	14 January 2015	60	25	21	14	80	69	+11	41.67
Tianjin Songjiang	(China)	11 May 2015	1 November 2015	22	8	8	6	22	19	+3	36.36
Zhejiang Yiteng	(China)	10 January 2016	22 March 2016	2	0	0	2	2	7	−5	0.00
Šibenik (interim)	(Croatia)	22 May 2016	30 May 2016	2	0	2	0	2	2	+0	0.00
Istra 1961	(Croatia)	22 July 2016	4 December 2016	17	5	6	6	21	23	−2	29.41
Lokomotiva	(Croatia)	27 December 2017	9 January 2021	115	49	29	37	171	139	+32	42.61
Rijeka	(Croatia)	1 March 2021	27 May 2022	63	37	9	17	130	85	+45	58.73
Al Nasr	(United Arab Emirates)	5 November 2022	24 May 2023	24	10	3	11	32	33	−1	41.67
Al Bataeh	(United Arab Emirates)	6 January 2024	8 January 2025	29	8	5	16	43	61	−18	27.59
Istra 1961	(Croatia)	13 June 2025	13 September 2025	6	1	2	3	6	10	−4	16.67
Al-Khaldiya	(Bahrain)	4 August 2026	Present	7	3	3	1	15	9	+6	42.86
Total				388	158	102	128	567	505	+62	40.72

== Honours ==
=== Manager ===
Individual

- Croatian Football League Manager of the Year: 2021–22
- Chinese League One Manager of the Year: 2014
- Croatian Football League runner-up: 2019–20
- Croatian Cup runner-up: 2019–20, 2021–22
- 2021–22 Croatian First League Manager of the Month: August, September, October
- 2019–20 Croatian First League Manager of the Month: June, July
- Beijing Baxy Honorary Credential: 2014
