= Zoran Slavica =

Croatian footballer (born 1967)

Personal information
- Date of birth: 28 March 1967 (age 59)
- Place of birth: Šibenik, SFR Yugoslavia
- Height: 1.90 m (6 ft 3 in)
- Position: Goalkeeper

Youth career
- Šibenik

Senior career*
Years	Team	Apps	(Gls)
1988–1990	Šibenik	73	(0)
1991–1995	Hajduk Split	65	(0)
1995–1996	Rijeka	13	(0)
1997–1999	Mladost 127	49	(0)
1999–2003	Šibenik	77	(0)
Total		277	(0)

International career^{‡}
1992	Croatia	1	(0)

Managerial career
- Krka Lozovac
- 2016: Primorac Biograd
- 2017: Šibenik
- 2017–2018: Zagora Unešić
- 2019: NK Vodice
- 2021: Zagora Unešić
- * Club domestic league appearances and goals as of 7 March 2014 ‡ National team caps and goals as of 7 March 2014

Zoran Slavica (born 28 March 1967) is a Croatian professional football manager and former player, who was most recently the manager of Treća HNL club NK Vodice.

== Club career ==
During his professional career he played for Šibenik in his hometown and for Hajduk Split.

== International career ==
Slavica also earned one cap for the Croatia national team in October 1992, against the Mexico national team.

== Managerial career ==
Slavica managed Primorac Biograd in 2016 and he succeeded Davor Višić as manager of Zagora Unešić in September 2017. He replaced Siniša Petrović at Zagora in August 2021, only to make way for Dario Sablić in December that year.
