= Jakov Surać =

Croatian footballer

Personal information
- Full name: Jakov Surać
- Date of birth: 12 February 1975 (age 51)
- Place of birth: Zadar, SR Croatia, SFR Yugoslavia
- Height: 1.87 m (6 ft 1 1/2 in)
- Position: Midfielder

Senior career*
Years	Team	Apps	(Gls)
1992–1998	Zadar	138	(10)
1998–1999	Osijek	19	(0)
1999–2001	NK Zagreb	52	(0)
2001–2016	Zadar	305	(15)
Total		514	(25)

International career
1994	Croatia U20	1	(0)
- * Club domestic league appearances and goals

Jakov Surać (born 12 February 1975) is a Croatian former professional footballer who played as a midfielder. In July 2014 he set a record of being the oldest player ever to play in a Croatian First Football League match. Surać is also the most capped played in the history of the Croatian First Football League.
