= Želimir Terkeš =

Bosnia and Herzegovina footballer

Personal information
- Date of birth: 8 January 1981 (age 45)
- Place of birth: Čapljina, SR Bosnia and Herzegovina, Yugoslavia
- Height: 1.84 m (6 ft 0 in)
- Position: Forward

Youth career
- Čapljina
- Zagreb

Senior career*
Years	Team	Apps	(Gls)
1997–2001	Zagreb	0	(0)
2001	Čapljina	15	(4)
2002–2003	Zrinjski Mostar	28	(16)
2003–2004	Inter Zaprešić	15	(0)
2004–2011	Zadar	110	(39)
2011	Chongqing Lifan	20	(3)
2012–2013	Zadar	16	(3)
2013	Perak FA	3	(0)
2014	Persija Jakarta	2	(0)
2014–2018	Zadar	42	(4)

International career
2008	Bosnia and Herzegovina	1	(0)

Managerial career
- 2019-2020: Lokomotiv Plovdiv (assistant)
- 2021-2022: HNK Zadar
- * Club domestic league appearances and goals as of 2 February 2016

Želimir Terkeš (born 8 January 1981) is a Bosnian-Herzegovinian retired football striker who last played for Zadar. He previously played for NK Zadar, NK Zagreb, HNK Čapljina, HŠK Zrinjski Mostar, NK Inter Zaprešić, Chongqing Lifan and Perak FA.

== Club career ==
Terkeš started his career in the youth ranks of his hometown club HNK Čapljina before moving the youth ranks of the Croatian club NK Zagreb. Unable to win a place in the first team, he returned to his home country, and after playing a year and a half for Zrinjski Mostar and featuring in the Bosnia and Herzegovina U-21 team, he secured a transfer back to Prva HNL, signing for NK Inter Zaprešić. Unable to get into a scoring form, he moved in the summer of 2004 to NK Zadar, but was relegated at the end of the season. Impressing in the Druga HNL, he helped his club get back to the top flight after two seasons. The 2007–2008 season was his most impressive by far. He was the top scorer of the league in the end with 21 goals, three goals ahead of the Rijeka's Radomir Đalović and four ahead of the Hajduk Split player Nikola Kalinić, also accumulating 7 assists, having a run of ten goals and three assists in six games (rounds 24–29) as well. He remained in Zadar, however, but after having surgery, he struggled to regain his previous form. Somewhat plagued by injuries, he scored 14 goals in 66 games in the next two and a half seasons. In March 2011, he secured a transfer to the China League One side Chongqing Lifan and in his last match for NK Zadar before that, a 1–0 home win against NK Lokomotiva, he scored the winning goal. He signed for Malaysia Super League side Perak FA in December 2013 after a successful trial.

On 28 February 2014, Terkeš joined Indonesia Super League team Persija Jakarta for one season contract.

== International career ==
His games secured him interest from foreign clubs and got him a call-up for the Bosnia and Herzegovina national football team, for which he made his debut on 1 June 2008 in the 1–0 friendly win against Azerbaijan. It remained his sole international appearance.

== Managerial career ==
He was named manager of HNK Zadar in January 2021, succeeding Josip Butić.
