= Mario Rosas =

Spanish footballer and manager

Personal information
- Full name: Mario Alberto Rosas Montero
- Date of birth: 22 May 1980 (age 46)
- Place of birth: Málaga, Spain
- Height: 1.67 m (5 ft 5 1/2 in)
- Position: Attacking midfielder

Youth career
- 1994–1997: Barcelona

Senior career*
Years	Team	Apps	(Gls)
1997–2000	Barcelona B	103	(32)
1998–2000	Barcelona	1	(0)
2000–2002	Alavés	6	(0)
2001–2002	→ Salamanca (loan)	33	(0)
2003	Numancia	0	(0)
2003–2004	Cádiz	32	(1)
2005	Girona	13	(1)
2005–2009	Castellón	123	(16)
2009–2010	Murcia	23	(0)
2010–2011	Salamanca	19	(0)
2011–2012	Khazar	10	(0)
2012	Huesca	20	(1)
2012–2013	Hércules	19	(1)
2013–2014	Eldense	?	(0)
Total		402	(52)

International career
1995–1996	Spain U16	6	(1)
1998	Spain U17	1	(0)
1996–1999	Spain U18	22	(5)

Managerial career
- 2018–2019: Novelda
- 2021–2022: Šibenik
- 2023–2025: Bellinzona (technical director)
- * Club domestic league appearances and goals

Mario Alberto Rosas Montero (born 22 May 1980), better known simply as Mario Rosas, is a Spanish football manager, who most recently was the technical director of AC Bellinzona in the Swiss Challenge League.

An unsuccessful youth graduate at Barcelona, he went on to appear in 308 Segunda División matches over 12 professional seasons, in representation of five teams, mainly Castellón. During his active footballing career he played as an attacking midfielder.

== Playing career ==
Rosas was born in Málaga, Andalusia. Another product of FC Barcelona's prolific youth system, La Masia, he quickly excelled at their reserves, making his first-team debut on 15 May 1998 in a 1–4 home loss for the already crowned champions against UD Salamanca, in what would be his only La Liga appearance for the Catalans.

Released by Barça in 2000, Rosas signed with another team in the top flight, Deportivo Alavés, but failed to appear regularly, being also loaned to second division's Salamanca in his second season. His career would be highly irregular the following years, with outputs of less than five games – CD Numancia, Cádiz CF, both in the same level – and also playing with Girona FC in division three, with relegation.

Rosas then joined another club in the second tier, CD Castellón, for 2005–06. After a slow first year he became an undisputed starter, adding a combined 16 league goals the next three. On 7 September 2008, he scored twice – one from a penalty kick, one of his specialties– in a 2–0 home win over RC Celta de Vigo.

In early August 2010, after Murcia's relegation, the 30-year-old Rosas agreed to a two-year deal at his former side Salamanca. After meeting the same fate in Castile and León, he terminated his contract and moved abroad for the first time in his career, signing for FK Khazar Lankaran, an Azerbaijan Premier League club in Azerbaijan.

On 5 December 2012, Hércules CF acquired both Rosas and Pablo Redondo, who were free agents.

== Managerial career ==
Rosas managed Tercera División club Novelda CF between 2018 and 2019.

=== Šibenik ===
On 14 June 2021, Rosas became the new manager of Croatian Prva HNL club HNK Šibenik. Šibenik opened the 2021–22 domestic league season with a 0–3 away defeat to Osijek on 16 July. In the next three games, Šibenik went on to lose to Gorica (3–1) and Hajduk Split (1–0), and played 1–1 with Slaven Belupo.

On 15 August, Šibenik came to its first win in the league in the first game at home in the league season, defeating Hrvatski Dragovoljac 6–2, with two goals from both Stipe Bačelić-Grgić and Antonio Marin, and one goal from Ivan Delić and Marin Jakoliš. After that, Šibenik failed to defeat Rijeka away (2–1), and managed to beat Istra 1961 at home (3–1), with a goal from Delić in both matches, and two goals from Marin Jakoliš in the latter game.

On 5 January 2022, Rosas parted ways with Šibenik.

=== AC Bellinzona ===
On 3 October 2023, he was announced as the new technical director of Swiss Challenge League side AC Bellinzona. He was removed from his post on 18 March 2025.

== Managerial statistics ==
As of match played 18 December 2021

Managerial record by team and tenure
Team	From	To	Record							
Team	From	To	G	W	D	L	GF	GA	GD	Win %
Šibenik	1 July 2021	5 January 2022	20	6	4	10	29	34	−5	30.00
Total			20	6	4	10	29	34	−5	30.00
