= Josip Lukunić =

Croatian former footballer

Personal information
- Date of birth: 27 March 1981 (age 45)
- Place of birth: Šibenik, SFR Yugoslavia
- Height: 1.75 m (5 ft 9 in)
- Position: Midfielder

Senior career*
Years	Team	Apps	(Gls)
2003–2005	Croatia Sesvete		
2004	→ Šibenik (loan)		
2004–2005	→ Pula 1856 (loan)	19	(2)
2005–2006	Pula Staro Češko	8	(0)
2006	Rijeka	12	(0)
2007	Pomorac		
2008	Karlovac		
2009	Konavljanin		
2010	Naftaš HAŠK		
2010–2012	Konavljanin		
- * Club domestic league appearances and goals

Josip Lukunić (born 27 March 1981) is a Croatian former footballer who played as a midfielder.
