= 2021–22 Croatian First Football League =

Hrvatski Telekom Prva liga
- Season: 2021–22
- Dates: 16 July 2021 – 21 May 2022
- Champions: Dinamo Zagreb (23rd Croatian title)
- Relegated: Hrvatski Dragovoljac
- Champions League: Dinamo Zagreb
- Europa Conference League: Hajduk Split; Osijek; Rijeka
- Matches: 180
- Goals: 504 (2.8 per match)
- Top goalscorer: Marko Livaja (28)
- Biggest home win: Dinamo Zagreb 8–0 Hrvatski Dragovoljac
- Biggest away win: Šibenik 0–5 Hrvatski Dragovoljac
- Highest scoring: Istra 1961 3–6 Rijeka
- Longest winning run: Dinamo Zagreb 6 games
- Longest unbeaten run: Osijek 13 games
- Longest winless run: Hrvatski Dragovoljac 15 games
- Longest losing run: Hrvatski Dragovoljac 8 games
- Highest attendance: 30,524; Hajduk Split 0–0 Osijek
- Lowest attendance: 50; Hrvatski Dragovoljac 1–1 Lokomotiva
- Total attendance: 502,012
- Average attendance: 2,789

The 2021–22 Croatian First Football League (also known as 1. HNL; officially Hrvatski Telekom Prva liga for sponsorship reasons) was the 31st season of the Croatian First Football League, the national championship for men's association football teams in Croatia, since its establishment in 1992. Contested by 10 teams, the season started on 16 July 2021 and ended on 21 May 2022. Dinamo Zagreb, the defending champions, successfully defended their title.

== Teams ==
On 23 April 2021, Croatian Football Federation announced that the first stage of licensing procedure for 2020–21 season was complete. For the 2021–22 Prva HNL, eleven clubs were issued a top level license: Cibalia, Dinamo Zagreb, Gorica, Hajduk Split, Hrvatski Dragovoljac, Istra 1961, Lokomotiva, Osijek, Rijeka, Slaven Belupo and Varaždin. All of these clubs except Cibalia and Hrvatski Dragovoljac were also issued a license for participating in UEFA competitions.

=== Changes ===
Hrvatski Dragovoljac (promoted after a seven-year absence) was promoted from the 2020–21 Druga HNL. Varaždin (relegated after two years in the top flight) was relegated to 2021–22 Druga HNL.

=== Stadia and locations ===
| Dinamo Zagreb | Gorica | Hajduk Split | Hrvatski Dragovoljac |
|---|---|---|---|
| Stadion Maksimir | Gradski stadion Velika Gorica | Stadion Poljud | Stadion Kranjčevićeva |
| Capacity: 35,123 | Capacity: 5,000 | Capacity: 34,198 | Capacity: 5,350 |
| Istra 1961 | Locations of teams in 2021–22 Prva HNL | | Lokomotiva |
| Stadion Aldo Drosina | Locations of teams in 2021–22 Prva HNL | | Stadion Kranjčevićeva |
| Capacity: 10,000 | Locations of teams in 2021–22 Prva HNL | | Capacity: 5,350 |
| Osijek | Rijeka | Slaven Belupo | Šibenik |
| Stadion Gradski vrt | Stadion Rujevica | Stadion Ivan Kušek-Apaš | Stadion Šubićevac |
| Capacity: 17,061 | Capacity: 8,279 | Capacity: 3,205 | Capacity: 3,412 |

| Team | City | Stadium | Capacity | Ref. |
|---|---|---|---|---|
| Dinamo Zagreb | Zagreb | Maksimir | 35,123 | |
| Gorica | Velika Gorica | ŠRC Velika Gorica | 5,000 | |
| Hajduk Split | Split | Poljud | 34,198 | |
| Hrvatski Dragovoljac | Zagreb | Kranjčevićeva^{1} | 5,350 | |
| Istra 1961 | Pula | Stadion Aldo Drosina | 10,000 | |
| Lokomotiva | Zagreb | Kranjčevićeva^{2} | 5,350 | |
| Osijek | Osijek | Gradski vrt | 17,061 | |
| Rijeka | Rijeka | Rujevica | 8,279 | |
| Slaven Belupo | Koprivnica | Stadion Ivan Kušek-Apaš | 3,205 | |
| Šibenik | Šibenik | Šubićevac | 3,412 | |

- ^{1} Hrvatski Dragovoljac host their home matches at Stadion Kranjčevićeva. The stadium is originally the home ground of third-level side NK Zagreb.
- ^{2} Lokomotiva host their home matches at Stadion Kranjčevićeva. The stadium is originally the home ground of third-level side NK Zagreb.

| Rank | Counties of Croatia | Number of teams | Club(s) |
|---|---|---|---|
| 1 | City of Zagreb | 3 | Dinamo Zagreb, Hrvatski Dragovoljac, Lokomotiva |
| 2 | Koprivnica-Križevci | 1 | Slaven Belupo |
| 2 | Osijek-Baranja | 1 | Osijek |
| 2 | Primorje-Gorski Kotar | 1 | Rijeka |
| 2 | Split-Dalmatia | 1 | Hajduk Split |
| 2 | Šibenik-Knin | 1 | Šibenik |
| 2 | Zagreb County | 1 | Gorica |

=== Personnel and kits ===
| Club | Manager | Captain | Kit manufacturer | Sponsors |
|---|---|---|---|---|
| Dinamo Zagreb | (Croatia) Ante Čačić | (North Macedonia) Arijan Ademi | Adidas | PSK |
| Gorica | (Croatia) Samir Toplak | (Croatia) Matija Dvorneković | Alpas | Admiral Bet |
| Hajduk Split | (Lithuania) Valdas Dambrauskas | (Croatia) Lovre Kalinić | Macron | Tommy |
| Hrvatski Dragovoljac | (Croatia) Dragan Tadić | (Croatia) Zvonimir Šubarić | Macron | — |
| Istra 1961 | (Spain) Gonzalo García | (Croatia) Slavko Blagojević | Kelme | Croatia Osiguranje |
| Lokomotiva | (Croatia) Silvijo Čabraja | (Croatia) Josip Pivarić | Adidas | — |
| Osijek | (Croatia) Nenad Bjelica | (Croatia) Mile Škorić | 2Rule | Mészáros és Mészáros Kft. |
| Rijeka | (Croatia) Goran Tomić | (Croatia) Hrvoje Smolčić | Joma | Sava Osiguranje |
| Slaven Belupo | (Croatia) Zoran Zekić | (Croatia) Goran Paracki | Adidas | Belupo |
| Šibenik | (Croatia) Dean Računica | (Croatia) Mario Ćurić | Macron | — |

=== Managerial changes ===
| Team | Outgoing manager | Manner of departure | Date of vacancy | Replaced by | Date of appointment | Position in table |
|---|---|---|---|---|---|---|
| Šibenik | (Spain) Sergi Escobar | Signed by Castellón | 23 May 2021 | (Spain) Mario Rosas | 14 June 2021 | Pre-season |
| Gorica | (Croatia) Siniša Oreščanin | Sacked | 24 May 2021 | (Croatia) Krunoslav Rendulić | 30 May 2021 | Pre-season |
| Hajduk Split | (Italy) Paolo Tramezzani | Mutual consent | 27 May 2021 | (Sweden) Jens Gustafsson | 28 May 2021 | Pre-season |
| Lokomotiva | (Croatia) Samir Toplak | Contract expired | 28 May 2021 | (Croatia) Silvijo Čabraja | 8 June 2021 | Pre-season |
| Slaven Belupo | (Croatia) Tomislav Stipić | Sacked | 10 June 2021 | (Croatia) Dean Klafurić | 11 June 2021 | Pre-season |
| Istra 1961 | (Croatia) Danijel Jumić | Contract expired | 11 June 2021 | (Spain) Gonzalo García | 11 June 2021 | Pre-season |
| Hrvatski Dragovoljac | (Croatia) Miroslav Kuljanac | Sacked | 22 August 2021 | (Croatia) Davor Mladina | 22 August 2021 | 10th |
| Slaven Belupo | (Croatia) Dean Klafurić | Sacked | 27 August 2021 | (Croatia) Zoran Zekić | 31 August 2021 | 8th |
| Hajduk Split | (Sweden) Jens Gustafsson | Sacked | 1 November 2021 | (Lithuania) Valdas Dambrauskas | 2 November 2021 | 4th |
| Dinamo Zagreb | (Croatia) Damir Krznar | Resigned | 1 December 2021 | (Croatia) Željko Kopić | 1 December 2021 | 3rd |
| Šibenik | (Spain) Mario Rosas | Sacked | 5 January 2022 | (Croatia) Ferdo Milin | 5 January 2022 | 7th |
| Hrvatski Dragovoljac | (Croatia) Davor Mladina | Sacked | 12 January 2022 | (Croatia) Dragan Tadić | 12 January 2022 | 10th |
| Šibenik | (Croatia) Ferdo Milin | Sacked | 12 February 2022 | (Croatia) Marko Kartelo (caretaker) | 13 February 2022 | 7th |
| Gorica | (Croatia) Krunoslav Rendulić | Sacked | 3 March 2022 | (Croatia) Samir Toplak | 3 March 2022 | 7th |
| Šibenik | (Croatia) Marko Kartelo (caretaker) | Removed from position | 4 March 2022 | (Croatia) Ivica Matas (caretaker) | 4 March 2022 | 8th |
| Šibenik | (Croatia) Ivica Matas (caretaker) | Signing of Računica | 7 March 2022 | (Croatia) Dean Računica | 7 March 2022 | 8th |
| Dinamo Zagreb | (Croatia) Željko Kopić | Sacked | 21 April 2022 | (Croatia) Ante Čačić | 21 April 2022 | 1st |

== League table ==
| Pos | Team | Pld | W | D | L | GF | GA | GD | Pts | Qualification or relegation |
|---|---|---|---|---|---|---|---|---|---|---|
| 1 | Dinamo Zagreb (C) | 36 | 24 | 7 | 5 | 68 | 22 | +46 | 79 | Qualification to Champions League second qualifying round |
| 2 | Hajduk Split | 36 | 21 | 9 | 6 | 64 | 31 | +33 | 72 | Qualification to Europa Conference League third qualifying round (Note: The cup winner, Hajduk Split, will enter the third qualifying round of the Europa Conference League.) |
| 3 | Osijek | 36 | 19 | 12 | 5 | 49 | 29 | +20 | 69 | Qualification to Europa Conference League second qualifying round |
| 4 | Rijeka | 36 | 20 | 5 | 11 | 71 | 51 | +20 | 65 | Qualification to Europa Conference League second qualifying round |
| 5 | Lokomotiva | 36 | 12 | 13 | 11 | 55 | 50 | +5 | 49 | |
| 6 | Gorica | 36 | 12 | 9 | 15 | 43 | 50 | −7 | 45 | |
| 7 | Slaven Belupo | 36 | 9 | 9 | 18 | 35 | 54 | −19 | 36 | |
| 8 | Šibenik | 36 | 9 | 5 | 22 | 46 | 75 | −29 | 32 | |
| 9 | Istra 1961 | 36 | 7 | 10 | 19 | 42 | 67 | −25 | 31 | |
| 10 | Hrvatski Dragovoljac (R) | 36 | 4 | 7 | 25 | 31 | 75 | −44 | 19 | Relegation to First Football League |

Source: PrvaHNL.hr
Rules for classification: 1) Points; 2) Head-to-head points; 3) Head-to-head goal difference; 4) Head-to-head goals scored (at home if two teams tied); 5) Goal difference; 6) Goals scored; 7) Play-off
(Note: Criteria 2-4 and 7 is only used if deciding champion, teams to international competition or teams for relegation and in that case criteria 6 will not be used).
(C) Champions; (R) Relegated

== Results ==
Each team plays home-and-away against every other team in the league twice, for a total of 36 matches each played.

| Home \ Away | DIN | GOR | HAJ | HRV | IST | LOK | OSI | RIJ | SLA | ŠIB | DIN | GOR | HAJ | HRV | IST | LOK | OSI | RIJ | SLA | ŠIB |
|---|---|---|---|---|---|---|---|---|---|---|---|---|---|---|---|---|---|---|---|---|
| Dinamo Zagreb | — | 1–0 | 0–2 | 8–0 | 1–1 | 1–0 | 1–1 | 3–3 | 0–2 | 2–0 | — | 2–1 | 3–1 | 2–0 | 3–0 | 0–0 | 3–0 | 2–0 | 3–0 | 3–0 |
| Gorica | 0–2 | — | 1–3 | 1–1 | 1–1 | 2–2 | 1–1 | 3–4 | 1–0 | 3–1 | 0–1 | — | 0–4 | 4–0 | 1–1 | 3–3 | 1–1 | 1–0 | 0–3 | 2–3 |
| Hajduk Split | 1–0 | 0–0 | — | 2–0 | 4–0 | 1–0 | 1–2 | 1–2 | 2–0 | 1–0 | 0–0 | 1–0 | — | 2–1 | 3–1 | 4–0 | 0–0 | 1–3 | 3–1 | 2–1 |
| Hrvatski Dragovoljac | 0–4 | 0–1 | 0–1 | — | 0–1 | 2–2 | 1–2 | 2–2 | 1–2 | 1–1 | 0–2 | 0–2 | 0–3 | — | 0–0 | 1–1 | 1–3 | 2–1 | 1–1 | 3–1 |
| Istra 1961 | 0–2 | 1–2 | 1–3 | 3–1 | — | 2–1 | 2–0 | 3–6 | 1–2 | 3–4 | 1–2 | 2–1 | 1–1 | 3–0 | — | 2–2 | 2–3 | 0–2 | 3–1 | 1–2 |
| Lokomotiva | 1–0 | 0–1 | 2–2 | 3–2 | 4–0 | — | 1–1 | 0–2 | 3–0 | 1–1 | 1–1 | 2–0 | 3–3 | 2–1 | 1–1 | — | 0–0 | 2–1 | 3–1 | 2–1 |
| Osijek | 0–2 | 3–2 | 1–1 | 1–0 | 3–0 | 3–1 | — | 1–0 | 0–0 | 3–0 | 1–0 | 0–0 | 0–0 | 2–1 | 2–2 | 1–0 | — | 1–0 | 1–2 | 3–1 |
| Rijeka | 3–3 | 2–0 | 2–3 | 4–1 | 2–0 | 1–2 | 0–0 | — | 2–1 | 2–1 | 1–2 | 1–2 | 0–3 | 1–0 | 1–0 | 3–2 | 3–1 | — | 3–0 | 4–2 |
| Slaven Belupo | 1–4 | 1–2 | 3–2 | 0–1 | 1–1 | 1–2 | 0–2 | 1–2 | — | 1–1 | 0–1 | 2–1 | 0–0 | 1–0 | 0–0 | 2–1 | 0–1 | 2–2 | — | 1–1 |
| Šibenik | 1–2 | 1–2 | 2–0 | 6–2 | 3–1 | 2–1 | 0–2 | 0–1 | 1–1 | — | 0–2 | 0–1 | 1–3 | 0–5 | 2–1 | 1–4 | 0–3 | 3–5 | 2–1 | — |

Source: Prva HNL (in Croatian)
Legend: Blue = home team win; Yellow = draw; Red = away team win.

== Statistics ==
=== Top goalscorers ===
As of 21 May 2022

| Rank | Player | Club | Goals |
|---|---|---|---|
| 1 | (Croatia) Marko Livaja | Hajduk Split | 28 |
| 2 | (Switzerland) Josip Drmić | Rijeka | 21 |
| 3 | (Croatia) Dion Drena Beljo | Istra 1961 | 15 |
| 4 | (Croatia) Mislav Oršić | Dinamo Zagreb | 14 |
| 5 | (Croatia) Marko Dabro | Lokomotiva | 13 |
| 6 | (Croatia) Robert Murić | Rijeka | 11 |
| 7 | (Croatia) Marin Jakoliš | Šibenik | 10 |
| 7 | (Croatia) Ivan Krstanović | Slaven Belupo | 10 |
| 7 | (Croatia) Sandro Kulenović | Lokomotiva | 10 |
| 7 | (Slovenia) Haris Vučkić | Rijeka | 10 |
| 7 | (Croatia) Ivan Delić | Šibenik | 10 |

== Awards ==
=== Annual awards ===
| Award | Winner | Club |
|---|---|---|
| Player of the Season | (Croatia) Marko Livaja | Hajduk Split |
| Manager of the Season | (Croatia) Goran Tomić | Rijeka |
| Young Player of the Season | (Croatia) Lukas Kačavenda | Lokomotiva |

Team of the Year
| Goalkeeper | (Croatia) Dominik Livaković (Dinamo Zagreb) | | | | |
| Defence | (North Macedonia) Stefan Ristovski (Dinamo Zagreb) | | (Croatia) Josip Elez (Hajduk Split) | (Croatia) Josip Šutalo (Dinamo Zagreb) | |
| Midfield | (Croatia) Petar Bočkaj (Dinamo Zagreb) | (Croatia) Filip Krovinović (Hajduk Split) | (Croatia) Domagoj Pavičić (Rijeka) | (North Macedonia) Arijan Ademi (Dinamo Zagreb) | (Croatia) Mislav Oršić (Dinamo Zagreb) |
| Attack | (Switzerland) Josip Drmić (Rijeka) | | | (Croatia) Marko Livaja (Hajduk Split) | |
