= 2006–07 in Croatian football =

First Division champions
- Dinamo Zagreb (9th title)

Second Division champions
- Inter Zaprešić

Third Division champions
- TBD

Croatian Cup winners
- Dinamo Zagreb (8th title)

Teams in Europe
- Dinamo Zagreb, Rijeka, Osijek, Varteks

Croatia national team
- UEFA Euro 2008 qualifying

The following article presents a summary of the 2006–07 football (soccer) season in Croatia, which was the 16th season of competitive football in the country.

== League competitions ==
=== Croatian First Division ===
Pos	Team	Pld	W	D	L	GF	GA	GD	Pts	Qualification or relegation
1	Dinamo Zagreb (C)	33	30	2	1	84	22	+62	92	Qualification to Champions League first qualifying round
2	Hajduk Split	33	22	6	5	60	25	+35	72	Qualification to UEFA Cup first qualifying round
3	NK Zagreb	33	18	4	11	57	40	+17	58	Qualification to Intertoto Cup first round
4	Šibenik	33	14	7	12	50	47	+3	49	
5	Slaven Belupo (Note: Qualified for Europe as 2006–07 Croatian Football Cup finalists.)	33	14	7	12	40	37	+3	49	Qualification to UEFA Cup first qualifying round
6	Osijek	33	11	10	12	42	45	−3	43	
7	Rijeka	33	12	6	15	51	53	−2	42	
8	Varteks	33	12	6	15	49	62	−13	42	
9	Međimurje	33	11	4	18	40	60	−20	37	
10	Cibalia	33	9	5	19	33	53	−20	32	
11	Pula (R)	33	6	11	16	28	40	−12	29	Qualification to relegation play-off
12	Kamen Ingrad (Note: Kamen Ingrad were docked 2 points.) (R)	33	3	4	26	27	77	−50	11	Relegation to Croatian Second Football League

Source: prva-hnl.hr (in Croatian)
Rules for classification: 1) points; 2) goal difference; 3) number of goals scored.
(C) Champions; (R) Relegated

=== Croatian Second Division ===
Pos	Team	Pld	W	D	L	GF	GA	GD	Pts	Promotion or relegation
1	Inter Zaprešić (C, P)	30	21	5	4	60	28	+32	68	Promotion to Croatian First Football League
2	Zadar (P)	30	20	5	5	55	25	+30	65	Qualification to promotion play-off
3	Croatia Sesvete	30	18	5	7	67	38	+29	59	
4	Hrvatski Dragovoljac	30	18	4	8	60	25	+35	58	
5	Solin	30	16	5	9	58	33	+25	53	
6	Imotski	30	12	8	10	41	44	−3	44	
7	Belišće	30	11	9	10	46	40	+6	42	
8	Pomorac	30	11	9	10	53	51	+2	42	
9	Vukovar '91	30	9	8	13	40	42	−2	35	
10	Naftaš HAŠK (Note: Naftaš HAŠK were refused a 2nd level license for 2007–08 season, due to this, Moslavina remained at 2nd level.) (R)	30	8	11	11	44	49	−5	35	
11	Mosor	30	9	8	13	37	46	−9	35	
12	Marsonia	30	9	7	14	38	50	−12	34	
13	Moslavina	30	9	6	15	44	57	−13	33	Relegation to Croatian Third Football League
14	Koprivnica (R)	30	7	8	15	42	66	−24	29	Relegation to Croatian Third Football League
15	Bjelovar (R)	30	4	6	20	25	66	−41	18	Relegation to Croatian Third Football League
16	Čakovec (R)	30	4	4	22	37	87	−50	16	Relegation to Croatian Third Football League

Source: rsssf.org
Rules for classification: 1) points; 2) goal difference; 3) number of goals scored.
(C) Champions; (P) Promoted; (R) Relegated

== Croatian clubs in Europe ==
=== Summary ===
Club	Competition	Final round
Dinamo Zagreb	UEFA Champions League; UEFA Cup	Third qualifying round First round
Rijeka	UEFA Cup	First qualifying round
Varteks	UEFA Cup	First qualifying round
Osijek	UEFA Intertoto Cup	Second round

=== Dinamo Zagreb ===
Date	Venue	Opponents	Score	Dinamo scorer(s)	Report
2006–07 Champions League - Second qualifying round
25 July 2006	Aukštaitija, Panevėžys (A)	(Lithuania) Ekranas	4–1	Eduardo (2), M. Buljat, Vugrinec	uefa.com
2 Aug 2006	Maksimir, Zagreb (H)	(Lithuania) Ekranas	5–2	Ljubojević (3), Vukojević, Vugrinec	uefa.com
2006–07 Champions League - Third qualifying round
8 Aug 2006	Maksimir, Zagreb (H)	(England) Arsenal	0–3		uefa.com
23 Aug 2006	Emirates, London (A)	(England) Arsenal	1–2	Eduardo	uefa.com
2006–07 UEFA Cup - First round
14 Sep 2006	Maksimir, Zagreb (H)	(France) Auxerre	1–2	Eduardo	uefa.com
28 Sep 2006	Abbé-Deschamps, Auxerre (A)	(France) Auxerre	1–3	Eduardo	uefa.com

=== Rijeka ===
Date	Venue	Opponents	Score	Slaven scorer(s)	Report
UEFA Cup - First qualifying round
13 July 2006	Stadion na Kantridi, Rijeka (H)	(Cyprus) Omonia	2–2	Bule, Kerkez (pen)	uefa.com
27 July 2006	GSP Stadium, Nicosia (A)	(Cyprus) Omonia	1–2	Lukunić	uefa.com

=== Varteks ===
Date	Venue	Opponents	Score	Slaven scorer(s)	Report
UEFA Cup - First qualifying round
13 July 2006	Stadion Varteks, Varaždin (H)	(Albania) KF Tirana	1–1	Novinić	uefa.com
27 July 2006	Selman Stërmasi, Tirana (A)	(Albania) KF Tirana	0–2		uefa.com

=== Osijek ===
Date	Venue	Opponents	Score	Hajduk scorer(s)	Report
Intertoto Cup - Second round
2 July 2006	Stadion Gradski vrt, Osijek (H)	(Cyprus) Ethnikos Achna	2–2		
8 July 2006	Dasaki Stadium, Akhna (A)	(Cyprus) Ethnikos Achna	0–0		
