= Vlatko Blažević =

Croatian footballer

Personal information
- Date of birth: 23 October 1994 (age 32)
- Place of birth: Zadar, Croatia
- Height: 1.80 m (5 ft 11 in)
- Position: Forward

Team information
- Current team: Zlatna Luka Sukošan

Youth career
- 2000–2014: Zadar

Senior career*
Years	Team	Apps	(Gls)
2014–2017	Zadar	62	(35)
2014–2015	→ Šibenik (loan)	12	(2)
2017–2018	Inter Zaprešić	28	(8)
2018–2019	Zadar	14	(3)
2019–2020	Seregno	21	(7)
2020	Kustošija	0	(0)
2020–2021	Martina		
2021–	Zadar		
- * Club domestic league appearances and goals as of 18:17, 20 May 2021 (UTC)

Vlatko Blažević (born 23 October 1994) is a Croatian football player that currently plays for NK Zadar.
