= Josip Butić =

Croatian footballer and manager

Personal information
- Date of birth: 12 December 1974 (age 51)
- Place of birth: Zadar, SFR Yugoslavia
- Height: 1.54 m (5 ft 1 in)
- Position: Midfielder

Youth career
- Zadar
- Hajduk Split

Senior career*
Years	Team	Apps	(Gls)
1993–1998	Zadar	69	(5)
1999	Wuhan Hongtao K		
2000	Segesta		
2000–2003	Zadar	33	(4)
2003–2005	Rijeka	56	(5)
2005–2007	Zadar	12	(0)

Managerial career
- 2015–2017: Zadar
- 2019–2020: Zadar (assistant)
- 2020: HNK Zadar
- 2021: HV Posedarje
- 2022: Dugopolje
- 2022: HV Posedarje
- * Club domestic league appearances and goals as of 13:51, 7 March 2014 (UTC)

Josip Butić (born 12 December 1974) is a Croatian professional football manager and former player. He was the manager of Croatian club HNK Zadar.

== Playing career ==
During his professional career he mainly played for Zadar, while also spending one season with Segesta and two seasons with Rijeka, as well as a short spell in China.

== Managerial career ==
Butić resigned at HV Posedarje in October 2022 after leading them for a second time. He had succeeded Hari Vukas as manager of Dugopolje in between.

== Honours ==
Zadar

- 1. B HNL: 1995–96
- Croatian Second League: 2000–01, 2006–07

Rijeka

- Croatian Cup: 2005
