= Ferdo Milin =

Croatian footballer and manager

Personal information
- Date of birth: 15 December 1977 (age 48)
- Place of birth: Zadar, SFR Yugoslavia
- Height: 1.82 m (5 ft 11 1/2 in)
- Position: Defender

Youth career
- Zadar

Senior career*
Years	Team	Apps	(Gls)
1996–2004	Zadar	53	(0)
1997–1998	→ Čakovec (loan)		
1999–2000	→ Šibenik (loan)		
2002–2003	→ Novalja (loan)		
2004–2005	Hajduk Split	3	(0)
2005–2011	Zadar	119	(0)

Managerial career
- 2012–2014: Zadar
- 2014–2017: Croatia U19
- 2017–2021: United Arab Emirates U17
- 2022: Šibenik
- 2022: Posušje
- * Club domestic league appearances and goals

Ferdo Milin (born 15 December 1977) is a Croatian professional football manager and former player.

== Managerial career ==
Milin was fired by NK Zadar in December 2013.

On 5 January 2022, Milin was appointed manager of Prva HNL club Šibenik. On 12 February 2022, following a 0–5 home defeat to Hrvatski Dragovoljac in the league, he was sacked.

Milin was confirmed as manager of Bosnian Premier League club Posušje on 14 June 2022, on a two-year contract. His first match saw Posušje draw against Velež Mostar on 15 July 2022. Milin was sacked by the club on 19 September 2022, following a series of poor results.
