= HNK Zadar =

Croatian football club

- Full name: Hrvatski nogometni klub Zadar
- Founded: 26 July 2020; 6 years ago
- Ground: Stadion Stanovi; ŠC Višnjik
- Capacity: 5,860
- Chairman: Pave Jusup
- Manager: Boris Pavić
- League: 3. NL – South
- 2025–26: 3. NL. – South, 3rd of 16
- Website: https://www.hnkzadar.hr/
Home colours	Away colours

Hrvatski nogometni klub Zadar (English: Croatian Football Club Zadar), commonly referred to as HNK Zadar or simply Zadar, is a Croatian professional football club based in the city of Zadar. It currently plays in the Third Football League.

== History ==
HNK Zadar was founded on July 26, 2020, as the informal successor of NK Zadar. The club's first president was former NK Zadar chairman Damir Knežević, while Marko Pinčić was named as head coach.

Pinčić surprisingly resigned from the role, and Josip Butić became the new head coach, with Zvonimir Jurić appointed as his assistant.

As of January 8, 2021, the club announced that Želimir Terkeš would become the new head coach, with Dragan Blatnjak becoming his assistant.

== Stadium ==
The club's home ground is the 3,858-seat Stadion Stanovi.

== Recent seasons ==
Season	League									Cup	Top goalscorer	
Season	Division	P	W	D	L	F	A	Pts	Pos	Cup	Player	Goals
2020–21	1. ŽNL ZD	26	23	1	2	111	16	70	1st ↑		Vlatko Blažević	26
2021–22	3. HNL South	34	16	11	7	69	28	59	4th		Ante Vukadinović	16
2022–23	3. NL South	30	18	6	6	67	31	60	2nd		Goran Zakarić	13
2023–24	3. NL South	30	22	5	3	78	27	71	1st		Krešimir Luetić	17
2024–25	3. NL South	30	18	7	5	63	30	61	2nd		Selmir Mahmutović	31
2025–26	3. NL South	30	18	6	6	65	27	60	3rd		Ivan Santini	18

Key

1st	2nd	↑	↓
Champions	Runners-up	Promoted	Relegated

Top scorer shown in bold when he was also top scorer for the division.

- P = Played
- W = Games won
- D = Games drawn
- L = Games lost
- F = Goals for
- A = Goals against
- Pts = Points
- Pos = Final position
- 1. HNL = Croatian First League
- 2. HNL = Croatian Second League
- PR = Preliminary round
- R1 = Round 1
- R2 = Round 2
- QF = Quarter-finals
- SF = Semi-finals
- RU = Runners-up
- W = Winners

== Managers ==
- (Croatia) Marko Pinčić (Jul 21, 2020 – Jul 24, 2020)
- (Croatia) Josip Butić (Jul 25, 2020 – Jan 8, 2021)
- (Bosnia and Herzegovina) Želimir Terkeš (Jan 8, 2021 – Dec 2022)
- (Bosnia and Herzegovina) Dragan Blatnjak (Dec 7, 2022 – 2023)
