= Joško Popović =

Croatian footballer (born 1966)

Personal information
- Date of birth: 19 January 1966 (age 60)
- Place of birth: Opuzen, SFR Yugoslavia
- Height: 1.77 m (5 ft 10 in)
- Position: Striker

Senior career*
Years	Team	Apps	(Gls)
1985–1991	Velež	64	(11)
1991–1996	NK Zagreb	123	(52)
1996–1997	FC Linz	17	(1)
1997–1999	Šibenik	51	(30)
1999–2001	NK Zagreb	39	(15)
2001–2004	Kamen Ingrad	59	(14)
Total		353	(123)

International career
1994	Croatia	1	(1)
- * Club domestic league appearances and goals

Joško Popović (born 19 January 1966) is a Croatian former professional footballer who played as a striker.

== Club career ==
Popović was born in Opuzen. He played for several Prva HNL sides during his career, including NK Zagreb, Kamen Ingrad and HNK Šibenik, with whom he was the league top scorer in the 1998–99 season with 21 goals.

As of May 2010 and the conclusion of the 2009–10 Prva HNL season, Popović is ranked as the third all-time top scorer in Prva HNL with 111 goals scored, behind Igor Cvitanović (126) and Davor Vugrinec (136).

== International career ==
Popović played one game for the Croatia national team, on 20 April 1994 against Slovakia in a friendly game, scoring in the 67th minute after being brought on at half time as a substitute for Ardian Kozniku.
