= Vjekoslav Lokica =

Croatian football player

Personal information
- Date of birth: 19 September 1965 (age 61)
- Place of birth: Split, SR Croatia, SFR Yugoslavia

Managerial career
- Years: Team
- 1995–1998: Zagorec
- 1998–2000: Solin
- 2000: Šibenik
- 2001: Šibenik
- 2001–2002: Osijek
- 2003: Rijeka
- 2004: Marsonia
- 2004–2005: Posušje
- 2007–2008: Hrvatski Dragovoljac
- 2008–2010: Primorje
- 2010–2011: Šibenik
- 2011–2012: Solin
- 2013–2014: NK Zagreb
- 2015: FC Brașov
- 2016–2017: RNK Split
- 2017: Meizhou Hakka

Vjekoslav Lokica (born 19 September 1965) is a Croatian professional football manager and former player.

== Managerial career ==
He replaced Goran Sablić as manager of RNK Split in July 2016.

== Personal life ==
He was married to Žana Lelas, a former basketball player.
