= Ismet Mulavdić =

Bosnian-Herzegovinian footballer

Personal information
- Full name: Ismet Mulavdić
- Date of birth: 19 October 1968 (age 58)
- Place of birth: Gradačac, SFR Yugoslavia
- Height: 1.87 m (6 ft 1 1/2 in)
- Position: Midfielder

Youth career
- 1976–1986: FK Sarajevo

Senior career*
Years	Team	Apps	(Gls)
1986–1988	Zvijezda Gradačac	26	(2)
1988–1991	FK Sarajevo	17	(3)
1992–1993	HNK Šibenik	27	(14)
1993–1995	Genk	21	(1)
- * Club domestic league appearances and goals as of 8 November 2014 ‡ National team caps and goals as of 16 November 2014

Ismet Mulavdić (born 19 October 1968) is a retired Bosnian-Herzegovinian footballer who played for Zvijezda Gradačac, FK Sarajevo, HNK Šibenik and Belgian side KRC Genk.
