= Ylli Shehu =

Albanian footballer

Personal information
- Date of birth: 13 March 1966 (age 60)
- Place of birth: Tirana, Albania
- Position: Striker

Senior career*
Years	Team	Apps	(Gls)
1984–1993	Partizani Tirana		
1993	Apollon Smyrnis	15	(2)
1994–1995	Šibenik	43	(24)
1995–1996	Cercle Brugge	33	(6)
1997–1998	Šibenik	31	(11)

International career
1988–1995	Albania	10	(1)

Managerial career
- 2010: Teuta Durrës
- 2011: Partizani
- * Club domestic league appearances and goals

Ylli Shehu (born 13 March 1966) is an Albanian retired football player.

== Club career ==
Shehu made his senior debut for Partizani against Naftëtari Qyteti Stalin in 1984 aged only 16 and he won two Albanian championships in 1987 and 1993 with them. He had been out injured for almost two years from 1990 only to regain fitness and win that second league title.

After that he moved to Croatia and spent several seasons with HNK Šibenik, scoring 40 goals in the Croatian Prva HNL. He also played for Apollon Athens in the Greek Alpha Ethniki and had a season in Belgium with Cercle Brugge.

== International career ==
He made his debut for Albania in a September 1988 friendly match away to Romania and earned a total of 10 caps, scoring 1 goal. His final international was a September 1995 European Championship qualification match against Bulgaria.

== Honours ==
- Albanian Superliga: 2

1987, 1993
