= NK Zadar =

Former Association football club in Croatia

- Full name: Nogometni klub Zadar
- Founded: 1945; 80 years ago as FD Zadar
- Dissolved: 20 July 2020; 4 years ago
- Ground: Stadion Stanovi
- Capacity: 5,860
- 2019–20: Treća HNL – South, 11th (relegated)
Home colours	Away colours

Nogometni klub Zadar (English: Football Club Zadar), commonly referred to as NK Zadar or simply Zadar, was a Croatian football club based in Zadar, a city on the Adriatic coast, best known for playing in the top flight of Croatian football for almost twenty years.

== History ==
The first football club in Zadar was established in 1876 and was named AC Dalmazia. The club played mostly in Italian leagues until the city annexation to Yugoslavia in 1945. On 26 April 1945, a new club named Fiskulturno društvo Zadar was founded, with departments of football, basketball and athletics. On 9 February 1949, the football department was spun off as NK Zadar.

Zadar played in the Yugoslav Second League on a number of occasions, most recently in 1986.

In 1992, as Zadarkomerc the club was a founding member of the Croatian First League. Since 2001, the club has officially been called NK Zadar.

The club's greatest success in the Croatian Football Cup was achieved in season 1995–96, when they lost in the semi-final against Croatia Zagreb.

NK Zadar played in the top tier from 1992 to 1999, from 2001 to 2005, and from 2007 to 2015. Most recently, the club has been experiencing financial difficulties, and after two seasons spent in the Croatian Third League – South (2016–17, 2017–18), the club was promoted to the Croatian Second League. After a mid-table finish in 2018–19, Zadar were administratively relegated to the Third League. As of June 2019, the club had hired an attorney to appeal against their relegation.

On 20 July 2020 it was announced that NK Zadar had dissolved because of bankruptcy. A new team, HNK Zadar, was announced as its formal successor.

== Stadium ==
NK Zadar's home stadium is the Stanovi with a capacity of 3,858 persons.

== Supporters ==
The club's supporters are known as the Tornado Zadar.

== Honours ==
- Prva B HNL:
  - Runners-up (1): 1995–96
- Druga HNL:
  - Runners-up (1): 2006–07
- Treća HNL – Jug:
  - Third place, promotion (1): 2017–18

== Seasons ==
Club's logo until 2014

Season	League									Cup	Top goalscorer	
Season	Division	P	W	D	L	F	A	Pts	Pos	Cup	Player	Goals
1992	1. HNL	22	4	5	13	20	49	13	10th		Mate Šestan	6
1992–93	1. HNL	30	9	7	14	30	48	25	12th	SF	Đovani Roso	9
1993–94	1. HNL	34	8	17	9	24	36	33	11th	R2	Josip Butić, Anđelko Kvesić	5
1994–95	1. HNL	30	7	10	13	33	47	31	13th ↓	R2	Hari Vukas	6
1995–96	1. B HNL	30	16	7	7	46	30	55	2nd ↑	SF	Zoran Vujčić	8
1996–97	1. A HNL	30	11	7	12	39	45	40	10th	R1	Saša Bjelanović, Joško Španjić	6
1997–98	1. HNL	32	10	5	17	36	50	35	6th	R2	Jakov Surać	8
1998–99	1. HNL	32	9	7	16	40	54	34	11th ↓	R2	Jakša Krstulović	10
1999–2000	2. HNL	32	19	5	8	47	25	62	3rd	R1	Miroslav Vukić	14
2000–01	2. HNL	34	18	7	9	40	30	61	4th ↑	R2		
2001–02	1. HNL	30	9	9	12	43	47	36	9th	R2	Zoran Zekić	14
2002–03	1. HNL	32	9	6	17	36	71	33	10th	R2	Dragan Blatnjak	8
2003–04	1. HNL	32	7	11	14	46	71	32	6th	R2	Mate Brajković	12
2004–05	1. HNL	32	10	2	20	36	70	32	12th ↓	R1	Leonardo Barnjak	11
2005–06	2. HNL South	32	15	6	11	52	34	51	7th	R1	Želimir Terkeš	11
2006–07	2. HNL	30	20	5	5	55	25	65	2nd ↑	R1	Goran Burčul	10
2007–08	1. HNL	33	11	7	15	49	61	40	9th	R1	**Želimir Terkeš**	21
2008–09	1. HNL	33	7	8	18	28	49	29	11th	R2	Želimir Terkeš	7
2009–10	1. HNL	30	9	7	14	27	41	34	12th		Antonio Mršić, Ivan Santini	6
2010–11	1. HNL	30	11	5	14	31	34	38	10th		Ivan Santini	10
2011–12	1. HNL	30	11	7	12	29	44	40	10th	R1	Ivan Santini	10
2012–13	1. HNL	33	9	8	15	37	59	35	9th	QF	Stipe Perica	8
2013–14	1. HNL	36	10	5	21	35	67	35	7th	QF	Josip Ivančić	8
2014–15	1. HNL	36	8	8	20	37	75	32	10th ↓	QF	Ivan Krstanović	6
2015–16	2. HNL	33	5	8	20	30	73	23	12th ↓	R2	Vlatko Blažević	10
2016–17	3. HNL South	34	13	10	11	50	40	49	7th	R1	**Vlatko Blažević**	25
2017–18	3. HNL South	30	16	6	8	74	37	54	3rd ↑	R2	Karlo Torbarina	16
2018–19	2. HNL	26	9	7	10	36	40	34	8th ↓	R2	Antonio Repić	12
2019–20	3. HNL South	18	7	6	5	29	25	27	6th ↓↓	R2	Josip Anić	5

Key

1st	2nd	↑	↓
Champions	Runners-up	Promoted	Relegated

Top scorer shown in bold when he was also top scorer for the division.

- P = Played
- W = Games won
- D = Games drawn
- L = Games lost
- F = Goals for
- A = Goals against
- Pts = Points
- Pos = Final position
- 1. HNL = Croatian First League
- 2. HNL = Croatian Second League
- PR = Preliminary round
- R1 = Round 1
- R2 = Round 2
- QF = Quarter-finals
- SF = Semi-finals
- RU = Runners-up
- W = Winners

== Notable players ==
To appear in this section a player must have:

- Played at least 150 league games for the club;
- Scored at least 50 league goals for the club; or
- Played at least one international match for their national team while playing for NK Zadar.

Years in brackets indicate their spells at the club.

- (Croatia) Jakov Surać (1992–1998, 2001–2016)
- (Croatia) Fahrudin Šehić (1992–1999)
- (Croatia) Zvonimir Jurić (1994–2005)
- (Croatia) Dalibor Zebić (1996–1999, 2001–2005)
- (Croatia) Luka Modrić (1996–2001; youth team)
- (Bosnia and Herzegovina) Dragan Blatnjak (2001–2003)
- (Croatia) Danijel Subašić (youth team until 2003; senior team 2003–2009)
- (Croatia) Josip Bilaver (2003–2017)
- (Bosnia and Herzegovina) Želimir Terkeš (2004–2011, 2012–2013, 2014–2018)
- (Croatia) Dragan Župan (2005–2006, 2006–2009, 2012–2013, 2016–2020)
- (Croatia) Šime Vrsaljko (youth team until 2006)

Note: For a complete list of NK Zadar players, see Category:NK Zadar players.

== Managerial history ==
- (Socialist Federal Republic of Yugoslavia) Ante Čačić (1989–1991)
- (Croatia) Goran Krešimir Vidov (1992)
- (Croatia) Petar Zrilić (1992)
- (Croatia) Ivica Matković (1992–1993)
- (Croatia) Jakov Pinčić (interim; 1993)
- (Croatia) Ivan Gudelj (1993)
- (Croatia) Jakov Pinčić (interim; 1993)
- (Croatia) Luka Bonačić (1994)
- (Croatia) Jakov Pinčić (interim; 1994)
- (Croatia) Tomislav Bašić (1994)
- (Croatia) Josip Bajlo (1994–1995)
- (Croatia) Stanko Mršić (1995–1996)
- (Croatia) Ante Čačić (1996–1997)
- (Croatia) Ivan Katalinić (1997–1998)
- (Croatia) Boris Tičić (1998)
- (Croatia) Josip Skoblar (1998)
- (Croatia) Josip Bajlo (1999)
- (Croatia) Nikica Cukrov (1999–2000)
- (Croatia) Jakov Pinčić (interim; 2000)
- (Croatia) Mladen Vranković (2000)
- (Croatia) Siniša Jalić (2000–2001)
- (Croatia) Miodrag Paunović (2001)
- (Croatia) Stanko Mršić (2001–2002)
- (Croatia) Vjeran Simunić (2002–2003)
- (Croatia) Stanko Mršić (2003–2005)
- (Croatia) Vjeran Simunić (2005)
- (Croatia) Jakov Pinčić (interim; 2005)
- (Croatia) Milo Nižetić (2005)
- (Croatia) Jakov Pinčić (interim; 2005)
- (Croatia) Predrag Jurić (2005–2006)
- (Croatia) Dalibor Zebić (2006–2008)
- (Croatia) Zvonimir Jurić (interim; 2008)
- (Croatia) Ivica Datković (2008)
- (Croatia) Dalibor Zebić (2008–2012)
- (Croatia) Ferdo Milin (2012–2014)
- (Croatia) Zvonimir Jurić (interim; 2014)
- (Croatia) Miroslav Blažević (2014–2015)
- (Croatia) Igor Štimac (2015)
- (Croatia) Zvonimir Jurić (interim; 2015)
- (Croatia) Josip Butić (2015–2017)
- (Croatia) Ivan Pudar (2017)
- (Croatia) Leopold Burčul (2017)
- (Croatia) Vjeran Simunić (2017–2018)
- (Bosnia and Herzegovina) Dragan Blatnjak (2018)
- (Croatia) Krešimir Sunara (2018–2019)
- (Bosnia and Herzegovina) Mislav Karoglan (2019)
- (Croatia) Marko Pinčić (2019–2020)
