= HNK Šibenik =

Association football club in Croatia

- Full name: Hrvatski nogometni klub Šibenik
- Nickname: Narančasti (The Oranges)
- Short name: ŠIB
- Founded: 1 December 1932; 93 years ago (as RSD Šibenik)
- Dissolved: 31 May 2026; 3 months ago
- Ground: Stadion Šubićevac
- Capacity: 3,970
Home colours	Away colours

Hrvatski nogometni klub Šibenik (English: Croatian Football Club Šibenik), better known as HNK Šibenik or simply Šibenik (pronounced [ʃîbeniːk]), was a Croatian professional football club based in Šibenik. The club played their home matches at the Stadion Šubićevac, which has a capacity of 3,970.

== History ==
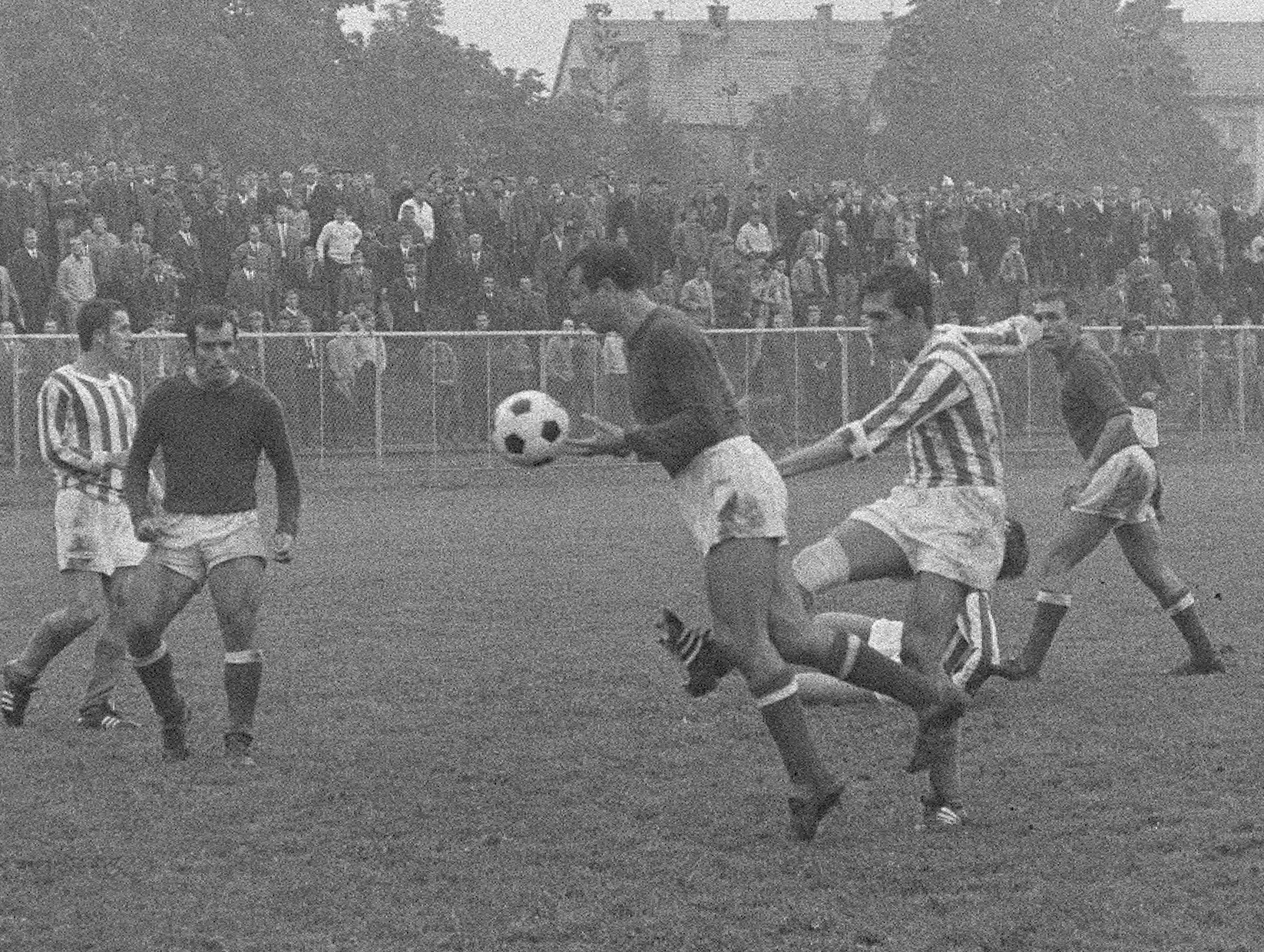
Železničar Maribor vs Šibenik in the Yugoslav Second League, September 1969.

The club was formed in 1932 under the name Radničko sportsko društvo Šibenik (Workers' Sport Association Šibenik). The first president, Dr Martin Čičin-Šain, was only appointed to this role during the first board meeting, which was held in August 1933. They played in a stadium in the town area of Crnica, next to the La Dalmatienne factory. The playing field was officially opened on 31 May 1936. The first matches played were part of a 1936 tournament between Šibenik, Osvit, Split and AŠK. Around the same time the first registered football club in Šibenik was also formed. This club was called Osvit and it was responsible for the construction of Šubićevac Stadium.

The club played its first official league match in 1946 under the name FD Šibenik and the very next year it was crowned the champion of the Dalmatia region. The club's new home ground was opened on 1 May 1948 and bore the name of "the people's hero", Rade Končar. In the 1950–51 season, Šibenik finished top of the Croatian Republic League and gained promotion to the Yugoslav Second League for the first time in its history. However, they were relegated immediately and it was not until 1954–55 that they returned to the second division. In 1957 the club made it to the semi-final of the Yugoslav Cup.

In 1983 Šibenik made it back to the Yugoslav Second League, where they played in the West Division, composed from 18 clubs from Slovenia, Croatia, Bosnia and Herzegovina and SAP Vojvodina. In their first season (1983–84) they finished fourth, while in the 1984–85 season they came close second, only three points behind the champion Čelik Zenica, thus falling short of winning promotion to the Yugoslav First League. This was their best result in the Yugoslav Second League ever. After holding the middle position of the table for the next couple of seasons, Šibenik finished fifth in the 1987–88 season. They defended their fifth place in the 1988–89 season, the first Yugoslav Second League season which featured a unified format instead of two divisions (West and East), as well as in the 1989–90 season.

Šibenik played in the Croatian First League for twelve consecutive seasons, from 1992 until 2003. In 2006 the club finished first in the Croatian Second League's southern division and returned to the first league. In the 2009–10 season, Šibenik finished fourth in domestic league, which was their best result ever, and thus qualified for the 2010–11 UEFA Europa League first qualifying round for the first time in its history. They were eliminated in the second qualifying round by Anorthosis Famagusta 2–3 on aggregate.

In the 2011–12 season, the club finished fourteenth and were relegated to the second league. In the following season, Šibenik finished fourth but due to financial difficulties, they were once again relegated to the third league. In the 2013–14 season, Šibenik finished in second place with their marksman Miro Slavica scoring 30 goals to take out the league's top goalscorer award, but failed to lead his side to promotion.

At the end of the 2014–15 season, Šibenik gained promotion to the second league, topping the third league – south. Mirko Labrović took over as manager in 2015. They finished close second to Cibalia in the 2015–16 season, failing to beat them in the last match of the season and thus failing to win direct promotion to the first tier by only one point. Šibenik played against Istra 1961 in the relegation play-offs on 29 May and 1 June 2016. Both matches ended 1–1 and Šibenik lost the play-off after penalty shootout.

In the 2018–19 season, Šibenik finished a close second to Varaždin, and again played relegation play-offs over Istra 1961. The first match played in Šibenik ended 1–1 but in the second match played on Stadion Aldo Drosina, Istra beat them by a scoreline of 0–2. On 6 May 2020, by a decision of the Croatian Football Federation to suspend the 2019–20 Croatian Second League season, Šibenik was promoted to the first tier after eight seasons.

Šibenik finished last in the 2024–25 season and were to be relegated to the Prva NL but failed to obtain a license and were demoted to the fourth tier – the 3. HNL South.

== Honours ==
- Yugoslav Third League (South):
  - Winners (3): 1950–51, 1975–76, 1982–83
- Croatian Second Football League / First Football League:
  - Winners (3): 2005–06, 2019–20, 2023–24
  - Runners-up (2): 2015–16, 2018–19
- Croatian Cup:
  - Runners-up (2): 2009–10, 2022–23

== Recent seasons ==
Season	League									Cup	European competitions		Top goalscorer	
Season	Division	P	W	D	L	F	A	Pts	Pos	Cup	European competitions		Player	Goals
1992	1. HNL	22	2	7	13	18	41	11	12th				Mile Petković, Dean Računica	4
1992–93	1. HNL	30	4	8	18	21	45	16	16th	QF			Ismet Mulavdić	6
1993–94	1. HNL	34	12	8	14	36	42	32	13th	R2			Ylli Shehu	7
1994–95	1. HNL	30	9	10	11	44	46	37	9th	R2			Ylli Shehu	22
1995–96	1. A HNL	36	15	6	15	44	43	51	7th	R2			Mate Baturina	11
1996–97	1. A HNL	30	11	8	11	35	30	41	7th	R1			Robert Banđen, Ylli Shehu	6
1997–98	1. HNL	32	9	8	15	35	45	34	9th	R1			Joško Popović	9
1998–99	1. HNL	32	12	5	15	48	59	41	8th	R2			**Joško Popović**	21
1999–2000	1. HNL	33	8	10	15	33	50	34	9th	R2			Klaudio Vuković	12
2000–01	1. HNL	32	12	7	13	40	40	43	7th	R2			Paul Matas	12
2001–02	1. HNL	30	10	6	14	33	36	36	11th	R2			Mate Dragičević	12
2002–03	1. HNL	32	8	7	17	37	53	31	12th ↓	R2			Ivan Bulat	9
2003–04	2. HNL South	32	15	4	13	45	42	49	4th	R1				
2004–05	2. HNL South	32	13	12	7	42	26	48^{(−3)}	4th	R1			Ivan Božić	12
2005–06	2. HNL South	32	21	6	5	71	38	69	1st ↑	R1			Ivan Božić	14
2006–07	1. HNL	33	14	7	12	50	47	49	4th	R2			Marko Kartelo	10
2007–08	1. HNL	33	9	12	12	34	52	39	10th	R2			Frane Vitaić, Ermin Zec	8
2008–09	1. HNL	33	13	7	13	44	35	46	6th	R1			Ermin Zec	14
2009–10	1. HNL	30	14	8	8	34	37	50	4th	RU			Ermin Zec	11
2010–11	1. HNL	30	8	11	11	37	38	35	12th	R2	Europa League	QR2	Mehmed Alispahić	11
2011–12	1. HNL	30	6	9	15	27	40	27	14th ↓	R1			Stipe Bačelić-Grgić	4
2012–13	2. HNL	30	13	10	7	42	31	48	4th ↓	R1			Franjo Tepurić	12
2013–14	3. HNL South	34	21	8	5	73	27	71	2nd	R1			Miro Slavica	30
2014–15	3. HNL South	34	23	5	6	78	25	74	1st ↑	R2			Igor Prijić	14
2015–16	2. HNL	33	20	9	4	54	21	69	2nd	R2			Theophilus Solomon	11
2016–17	2. HNL	33	12	9	12	32	33	45	7th	R2			Miro Slavica	9
2017–18	2. HNL	33	11	9	13	39	43	42	7th	R2			Davor Kukec	7
2018–19	2. HNL	26	13	7	6	38	25	46	2nd	R2			Prince Ampem	7
2019–20	2. HNL	19	13	2	4	26	15	41	1st ↑	QF			Luka Juričić	8
2020–21	1. HNL	36	9	8	19	32	47	35	6th	R2			Deni Jurić	11
2021–22	1. HNL	36	9	5	22	46	75	32	8th	R2			Ivan Delić, Marin Jakoliš	10
2022–23	HNL	36	5	12	19	24	56	27	10th ↓	RU			Ivan Dolček	5
2023–24	1. NL	33	26	4	3	68	18	82	1st ↑	R1			Josip Majić	14
2024–25	HNL	36	7	9	20	28	60	30	10th ↓	R2			Ivan Santini	7
2025–26	3. NL South	30	9	7	14	32	49	34	13th ↓↓	R1			Frano Medić	8

Key

League: P = Matches played; W = Matches won; D = Matches drawn; L = Matches lost; F = Goals for; A = Goals against; Pts = Points won; Pos = Final position;
Cup: R1 = First round; R2 = Round of 16; QF = Quarter-final; SF = Semi-final; RU = Runner-up; W = Competition won;

=== All-time record appearances ===
Rank	Player	Appearances
1	(Croatia) Josip Bulat	231
2	(Croatia) Klaudio Vuković	213
3	(Kosovo) Xhevdet Muriqi	199
4	(Croatia) Armando Marenzi	197
5	(Bosnia and Herzegovina) Anel Karabeg	175
6	(Croatia) Hrvoje Slavica	165
7	(Croatia) Zoran Slavica	150
8	(Croatia) Marko Kartelo	145
9	(Croatia) Martin Vukorepa	143
10	(Croatia) **Ivan Roca**	140
Updated 25.05.2025 (**Bold** denotes players still playing in the Hnk Šibenik, italics denotes players still playing professional football).

=== All-time top scorers Hnk Šibenik ===
Rank	Player	Goals
1	(Croatia) Klaudio Vuković	50
2	(Croatia) Armando Marenzi	41
3	(Croatia) Miro Slavica	39
4	(Albania) Ylli Shehu	35
5	(Bosnia and Herzegovina) Ermin Zec	35
6	(Socialist Federal Republic of Yugoslavia) Petar Nadoveza	30
7	(Bosnia and Herzegovina) Ivan Božić	30
8	(Croatia) Joško Popović	30
9	(Croatia) Dražen Gović	28
10	(Bosnia and Herzegovina) Mehmed Alispahić	25
Updated 05.03.2025 (**Bold** denotes players still playing in the Hnk Šibenik, italics denotes players still playing professional football).

== European record ==
=== Summary ===
Competition	Pld	W	D	L	GF	GA	Last season played
UEFA Europa League	4	2	1	1	5	3	2010–11
Total	4	2	1	1	5	3	

Last updated on 10 September 2010.
Pld = Matches played; W = Matches won; D = Matches drawn; L = Matches lost; GF = Goals for; GA = Goals against

=== By season ===
Season	Competition	Round	Opponent	Home	Away	Agg.
2010–11	Europa League	QR1	(Malta) Sliema Wanderers	0–0	3–0	3–0
2010–11	Europa League	QR2	(Cyprus) Anorthosis	0–3 (aet)	2–0	2–3

== Players ==
=== Current squad ===
As of 12 March 2025

Note: Flags indicate national team as defined under FIFA eligibility rules; some limited exceptions apply. Players may hold more than one non-FIFA nationality.

No.	Pos.	Nation	Player
1	GK	CRO	Antonio Đaković (captain)
3	DF	USA	Aidan Liu
4	DF	CRO	Josip Gačić
5	MF	CRO	Lovro Cvek
7	MF	CRO	Josip Majić
8	MF	MNE	Ognjen Bakić
9	FW	CRO	Ivan Božić
11	FW	CRO	Ivan Laća
15	DF	GHA	Morrison Agyemang
17	FW	CRO	Zlatan Koščević
18	FW	CRO	Ivan Santini
21	MF	ESP	Iker Pozo
22	FW	CRO	Toni Kolega
23	DF	CRO	Zoran Nižić

No.	Pos.	Nation	Player
24	DF	CRO	Roberto Punčec
25	GK	CRO	Patrik Mohorović
27	MF	CRO	Lovre Kulušić
28	MF	CRO	Ivan Roca
30	FW	CRO	Bruno Zdunić (on loan from Dugopolje)
32	DF	BIH	Elvir Duraković (on loan from Sarajevo)
36	MF	CRO	Ante Kavelj
40	GK	CRO	Ivan Filipović (on loan from Dinamo Zagreb)
43	DF	CRO	Šime Gržan
44	DF	MKD	Leonard Zuta
55	DF	AUT	Stefan Perić
70	MF	CRO	Antonio Jakoliš
77	FW	CRO	Ivan Baković
88	MF	CRO	Marin Prekodravac

=== Dual registration ===
Note: Flags indicate national team as defined under FIFA eligibility rules; some limited exceptions apply. Players may hold more than one non-FIFA nationality.

No.	Pos.	Nation	Player
74	GK	CRO	Luigi Mišević (at Solin)

=== Out on loan ===
Note: Flags indicate national team as defined under FIFA eligibility rules; some limited exceptions apply. Players may hold more than one non-FIFA nationality.

No.	Pos.	Nation	Player
2	DF	CRO	Bruno Brajković (at Dugopolje until 30 June 2025)
6	MF	CMR	Joseph Iyendjock (at Croatia Zmijavci until 29 June 2025)
19	FW	CRO	Ivan Delić (at Bravo until 14 June 2025)

No.	Pos.	Nation	Player
99	FW	CRO	Diego Sekulić (at Mladost Ždralovi until 30 June 2025)
—	MF	BRA	Kayky Alves (at Croatia Zmijavci until 29 June 2025)
—	FW	SUI	Leo Perić (at Dugopolje until 14 June 2025)

== Personnel ==
=== Coaching staff ===
As of 28.11.2024

Position	Staff
Director of football	(Croatia) Hrvoje Kulušić
Head coach	(Croatia) Rajko Vidović
Assistant coaches	(Croatia) Ivan Božić (Croatia) Ivo Šupe
Goalkeeper coach	(Croatia) Marko Mihaljević
Fitness coaches	(Croatia) Frane Cinotti (Croatia) Ante Rak
Physiotherapists	(Croatia) Ivan Čular (Croatia) Duje Protega (Croatia) Mario Petrović
Team manager	(Croatia) Josip Maleš
Analyst	(Croatia) Armin Alibegović

== Notable players ==
The following HNK Šibenik players have been capped at full international level. Years in brackets indicate their spells at the club.

- (Socialist Federal Republic of Yugoslavia) Petar Nadoveza (1959–1963)
- (Socialist Federal Republic of Yugoslavia) Krasnodar Rora (1962–1964)
- (Socialist Federal Republic of Yugoslavia) Nikica Cukrov (1971–1975)
- (Socialist Federal Republic of Yugoslavia) Petar Nikezić (1982–1984)
- (Socialist Federal Republic of Yugoslavia) (Croatia) Dean Računica (1986–1992)
- (Socialist Federal Republic of Yugoslavia) Slaven Bilić (1988–1989)
- (Socialist Federal Republic of Yugoslavia) (Croatia) Tomislav Erceg (1990–1991)
- (Croatia) Mate Baturina (1993–1996)
- (Albania) Ylli Shehu (1994–1995)
- (Bosnia and Herzegovina) Mario Jurić (1995–1999, 2007)
- (Albania) Amarildo Zela (1996–1997)
- (Croatia) Ivica Križanac (1997–1998)
- (Croatia) Joško Popović (1997–1999)
- (Croatia) Gordon Schildenfeld (2001–2007)
- (Croatia) Mate Maleš (2003–2007)
- (Croatia) Ante Rukavina (2004–2007)
- (Croatia) Nikola Kalinić (2006–2007)
- (Bosnia and Herzegovina) Ermin Zec (2007–2010)
- (Bosnia and Herzegovina) Mehmed Alispahić (2008–2011, 2016–2017, 2017–2018)
- (Bosnia and Herzegovina) Samir Duro (2009)
- (North Macedonia) Daniel Georgievski (2010–2012)
- (Croatia) Duje Ćaleta-Car (2012–2013)
- (Croatia) Mateo Barać (2015–2016)
- (Lithuania) Simonas Stankevičius (2016)
- (Nigeria) Jamilu Collins (2016–2017)
- (Croatia) Nediljko Labrović (2018–2021)
- (Bosnia and Herzegovina) Boris Pandža (2018–2021)
- (North Macedonia) Todor Todoroski (2019–2021)
- (North Macedonia) Isnik Alimi (2020–2021)
- (Croatia) Ivan Močinić (2020–2021)
- (Haiti) Christopher Attys (2020–2021)
- (Kosovo) Emir Sahiti (2020–2021)
- (Kosovo) Suad Sahiti (2020–2021)
- (India) Sandesh Jhingan (2021–2022)
- (Albania) Eros Grezda (2022)
- (Croatia) Duje Čop (2022–2023)
- (Bosnia and Herzegovina) Zoran Kvržić (2023)
- (North Macedonia) David Toshevski (2023–2024)
- (Croatia) Ivan Santini (2024–2025)
- (Croatia) Zoran Nižić (2024–2025)
- (North Macedonia) Leonard Zuta (2024–2025)

== Coaching history ==
- (Socialist Federal Republic of Yugoslavia) Ivica Šangulin (1983–1985)
- (Socialist Federal Republic of Yugoslavia) Petar Nadoveza (1985–1986)
- (Socialist Federal Republic of Yugoslavia) Đorđe Milić (1986–1987)
- (Socialist Federal Republic of Yugoslavia) Milan Ribar (1987–1988)
- (Socialist Federal Republic of Yugoslavia) Žarko Nedeljković (1988–1989)
- (Socialist Federal Republic of Yugoslavia) Mladen Vranković (1989–1990)
- (Socialist Federal Republic of Yugoslavia) Nikica Cukrov (1990–1992)
- (Bosnia and Herzegovina) Franjo Džidić (1992–1993)
- (Croatia) Krasnodar Rora (1993)
- (Croatia) Branko Tucak (1993–1994)
- (Croatia) Ivica Matković (1993–1994)
- (Croatia) Ivica Šangulin (1994–1995)
- (Croatia) Rajko Magić (1995)
- (Croatia) Željko Maretić (1995–1996)
- (Croatia) Vinko Begović (1996–1997)
- (Croatia) Željko Maretić (1997–1998)
- (Croatia) Ivan Buljan (1998)
- (Croatia) Stipe Kedžo (1998)
- (Croatia) Rajko Magić (1998–1999)
- (Croatia) Stanko Mršić (1999)
- (Croatia) Anđelko Godinić (1999)
- (Croatia) Goran Krešimir Vidov (1999)
- (Croatia) Željko Maretić (1999–2000)
- (Croatia) Vjekoslav Lokica (2000)
- (Croatia) Milo Nižetić (2000–2001)
- (Croatia) Vjekoslav Lokica (2001–2002)
- (Croatia) Franko Bogdan (2002)
- (Croatia) Stanko Mršić (2002–2003)
- (Croatia) Luka Bonačić (2003)
- (Croatia) Franko Bogdan (2003–2004)
- (Croatia) Milan Petrović (2004)
- (Croatia) Petar Bakotić (2004–2005)
- (Croatia) Ivan Pudar (2005–2007)
- (Bosnia and Herzegovina) Anel Karabeg (2007)
- (Croatia) Ivica Kalinić (2007–2009)
- (Croatia) Anđelko Godinić (interim) (2009)
- (Croatia) Branko Karačić (2009–2010)
- (Croatia) Anđelko Godinić (interim) (2010)
- (Croatia) Vjekoslav Lokica (2010–2011)
- (Croatia) Goran Tomić (2011–2013)
- (Croatia) Ivo Šupe (2013)
- (Croatia) Damir Petravić (2013)
- (Croatia) Ivan Bulat (interim) (2013)
- (Croatia) Nikica Cukrov (2013–2014)
- (Croatia) Damir Petravić (2014)
- (Croatia) Mirko Labrović (2014–2016)
- (Croatia) Krešimir Sunara (2016)
- (Croatia) Goran Tomić (2016)
- (Croatia) Ivan Katalinić (2016)
- (Croatia) Anđelko Godinić (2016)
- (Croatia) Stipe Balajić (2016–2017)
- (Croatia) Zoran Slavica (2017)
- (Croatia) Borimir Perković (2017–2019)
- (Croatia) Krunoslav Rendulić (2019–2021)
- (Spain) Sergi Escobar (2021)
- (Spain) Mario Rosas (2021–2022)
- (Croatia) Ferdo Milin (2022)
- (Croatia) Marko Kartelo (interim) (2022)
- (Croatia) Marko Kartelo (2022)
- (Croatia) Ivica Matas (interim) (2022)
- (Croatia) Dean Računica (2022)
- (Austria) Damir Čanadi (2022)
- (Croatia) Mario Cvitanović (2022–2023)
- (Austria) Damir Čanadi (2023)
- (Croatia) Mario Carević (2023–2024)
- (Croatia) Marko Kartelo (2024)
- (Croatia) Rajko Vidović(2024-2025)
- (Croatia) Marin Oršulić

(2025-)
