= HNK Primorac Biograd na Moru =

Croatian football club

HNK Primorac
- Full name: Hrvatski nogometni klub Primorac
- Nickname: Svijetlo-plavi (Light blues)
- Founded: 1919
- Ground: Gradski stadion Kazimir i Silvio
- Capacity: 1,500
- League: Treća HNL South
Home colours	Away colours

HNK Primorac is a Croatian professional football club based in the town of Biograd na Moru. The club plays its home games at Stadion Kazimira i Silvija.

The club took part in the 2007 Croatian Cup, when it was eliminated in the round of 16.
