= 2021–22 HNK Rijeka season =

Rijeka
2021–22 season
- President: Damir Mišković
- Head coach: Goran Tomić
- Stadium: Rujevica
- Prva HNL: 4th
- Croatian Cup: Runners-up
- UEFA Europa Conference League: Play-off round
- Top goalscorer: League: Josip Drmić (21); All: Josip Drmić (25)
- Highest home attendance: 7,485 v Hajduk Split (8 May 2022)
- Lowest home attendance: 0 v Hrvatski Dragovoljac (4 December 2021)
- Average home league attendance: 3,587
Home colours	Away colours	Third colours

The 2021–22 season was the 76th season in HNK Rijeka’s history. It was their 31st successive season in the Croatian First Football League, and 48th successive top tier season.

== Competitions ==
=== Overall ===
Competition	First match	Last match	Starting round	Final position	Record							
Competition	First match	Last match	Starting round	Final position	Pld	W	D	L	GF	GA	GD	Win %
HT Prva liga	17 July 2021	21 May 2022	Matchday 1	4th	36	20	5	11	71	51	+20	55.56
Croatian Cup	21 September 2021	26 May 2022	First round	Runners-up	5	4	0	1	20	6	+14	80.00
UEFA Europa Conference League	22 July 2021	26 August 2021	Second qualifying round	Play-off round	6	3	2	1	9	5	+4	50.00
Total					47	27	7	13	100	62	+38	57.45

Last updated: 26 May 2022
Source: Soccerway

=== HT Prva liga ===
==== League table ====
Pos	Team	Pld	W	D	L	GF	GA	GD	Pts	Qualification or relegation
2	Hajduk Split	36	21	9	6	64	31	+33	72	Qualification to Europa Conference League third qualifying round (Note: The cup winner, Hajduk Split, will enter the third qualifying round of the Europa Conference League.)
3	Osijek	36	19	12	5	49	29	+20	69	Qualification to Europa Conference League second qualifying round
4	Rijeka	36	20	5	11	71	51	+20	65	Qualification to Europa Conference League second qualifying round
5	Lokomotiva	36	12	13	11	55	50	+5	49	
6	Gorica	36	12	9	15	43	50	−7	45	

Source: PrvaHNL.hr
Rules for classification: 1) Points; 2) Head-to-head points; 3) Head-to-head goal difference; 4) Head-to-head goals scored (at home if two teams tied); 5) Goal difference; 6) Goals scored; 7) Play-off
(Note: Criteria 2-4 and 7 is only used if deciding champion, teams to international competition or teams for relegation and in that case criteria 6 will not be used).

==== Results summary ====
Overall								Home						Away					
Pld	W	D	L	GF	GA	GD	Pts	W	D	L	GF	GA	GD	W	D	L	GF	GA	GD
36	20	5	11	71	51	+20	65	11	2	5	35	23	+12	9	3	6	36	28	+8

Last updated: 21 May 2022.
Source: Prva HNL

==== Results by round ====
Round	1	2	3	4	5	6	7	8	9	10	11	12	13	14	15	16	17	18	19	20	21	22	23	24	25	26	27	28	29	30	31	32	33	34	35	36
Ground	H	H	A	H	A	H	A	H	A	A	A	H	A	H	A	H	A	H	H	H	A	H	A	H	A	H	A	A	A	H	A	H	A	H	A	H
Result	W	W	D	L	L	W	W	W	D	W	W	D	W	D	W	L	W	W	L	W	L	W	L	W	W	W	L	L	W	L	L	W	W	L	D	W
Position	3	2	1	4	5	5	3	3	3	3	2	2	2	2	1	3	3	1	3	2	4	4	4	4	4	3	4	4	4	4	4	4	4	4	4	4

Updated to match(es) played on 21 May 2022. Source: Prva HNL
A = Away; H = Home; W = Win; D = Draw; L = Loss

=== Results by opponent ===
Team	Results				Points
Team	1	2	3	4	Points
Dinamo Zagreb	3–3	3–3	0–2	1–2	2
Gorica	2–0	4–3	1–2	0–1	6
Hajduk Split	2–1	2–3	3–1	0–3	6
Hrvatski Dragovoljac	2–2	4–1	1–2	1–0	7
Istra 1961	2–0	6–3	1–0	2–0	12
Lokomotiva	1–2	2–0	3–2	1–2	6
Osijek	0–1	0–0	0–1	3–1	4
Slaven Belupo	2–1	2–1	3–0	2–2	10
Šibenik	2–1	1–0	4–2	5–3	12

Source: 2021–22 Croatian First Football League article

== Matches ==
=== HT Prva liga ===
17 July 2021 1	Rijeka	2–0	Gorica	Rijeka
21:00 CEST (UTC+02:00)	Murić 20' (pen.); Lepinjica 55'	Report	Dieye (yellow card) 12'; Moro (yellow card) 19'	Stadium: Rujevica; Attendance: 1,652; Referee: Ivan Vučković (Zagreb)

25 July 2021 2	Rijeka	2–0	Istra 1961	Rijeka
18:55 CEST (UTC+02:00)	Drmić 78' 82'; Obregón (yellow card) 81'; Pavičić (penalty missed) 90+6'	Report	Blagojević (yellow card) 18'; Matić (yellow card) 25'; Perera (yellow card) 44'; Siljan (yellow card) 90+5'	Stadium: Rujevica; Attendance: 2,015; Referee: Fran Jović (Zagreb)

1 August 2021 3	Dinamo Zagreb	3–3	Rijeka	Zagreb
21:00 CEST (UTC+02:00)	Perić 9'; Majer 32'; Théophile-Catherine (yellow card) 36'; Oršić 59'	Report	Pavičić (yellow card) 10'; Abass 23' 38'; Lepinjica (yellow card) 34'; Drmić 43'	Stadium: Maksimir; Attendance: 1,503; Referee: Tihomir Pejin (Donji Miholjac)

16 August 2021 5	Osijek	1–0	Rijeka	Osijek
21:00 CEST (UTC+02:00)	Miérez 17'	Report	Vukčević (yellow card) 90+3'	Stadium: Gradski Vrt; Attendance: 2,069; Referee: Mario Zebec (Cestica)

22 August 2021 6	Rijeka	2–1	Šibenik	Rijeka
21:00 CEST (UTC+02:00)	Krešić (yellow card) 14'; Stanić (yellow card) 31'; Drmić 64' (pen.); Bušnja 77'	Report	A. Jakoliš (yellow card) 5'; Delić 47'; Batarelo (yellow card) 63'; Rak (yellow card) 76'; Grdić (yellow card) 88'; M. Jakoliš (yellow card) 90+2'	Stadium: Rujevica; Attendance: 2,281; Referee: Goran Pečarić (Zagreb)

29 August 2021 7	Hajduk Split	1–2	Rijeka	Split
21:00 CEST (UTC+02:00)	Elez (yellow card) 35' (goal) 54'; Krovinović (yellow card) 51'	Report	Tomečak 21'; Drmić 43' (yellow card) 61'; Selahi (yellow card) 55'; Velkovski (yellow card) 90+4'	Stadium: Poljud; Attendance: 15,967; Referee: Fran Jović (Zagreb)

11 September 2021 8	Rijeka	2–1	Slaven Belupo	Rijeka
19:05 CEST (UTC+02:00)	Galović (yellow card) 47'; Abass (yellow card) 54'; Drmić 78' 85'	Report	Caimacov (yellow card) 37'; Bogojević (yellow card) 56'; Hadžić 64'; Paracki (yellow card) 83'	Stadium: Rujevica; Attendance: 2,237; Referee: Duje Strukan (Split)

17 September 2021 9	Hrvatski Dragovoljac	2–2	Rijeka	Zagreb
20:00 CEST (UTC+02:00)	Petković 28'; Majstorović 36' (pen.); Viduka (yellow card) 41'; Mamić (yellow card) 64'; Bagadur (yellow card) 71'; Turčin (yellow card) 71'; Vuco (yellow card) 80'	Report	Ampem 57' (yellow card) 87'; Pavičić 60'	Stadium: Kranjčevićeva; Attendance: 420; Referee: Dario Bel (Osijek)

26 September 2021 10	Gorica	3–4	Rijeka	Velika Gorica
17:00 CEST (UTC+02:00)	Lovrić 11' (pen.) (yellow card) 24'; Mitrović (yellow card) 21'; Marjanović 45+3'; Pršir (yellow card) 48'; Sarić (yellow card) 49'; Delfi (red card) 51'; Doka (yellow card) 57'; Fruk 90'	Report	Krešić (yellow card) 11'; Murić (yellow card) 19' (goal) 58' (pen.); Abass 43'; Selahi 46'; Bušnja (yellow card) 88'; Pavičić 90+1'	Stadium: Radnik; Attendance: 1,000; Referee: Mario Zebec (Cestica)

2 October 2021 11	Istra 1961	3–6	Rijeka	Pula
19:05 CEST (UTC+02:00)	Silva 18'; Blagojević (yellow card) 46'; Galilea (yellow card) 55'; Mahmoud 59'; Lisica 78'	Report	Krešić 24' (yellow card) 88'; Smolčić (yellow card) 27'; Pavičić 32'; Ampem (yellow card) 35' (goal) 52'; Vučkić 37' 41' (yellow card) 50'; Escoval (yellow card) 44'; Bušnja 85'; Selahi (yellow card) 88'	Stadium: Aldo Drosina; Attendance: 1,274; Referee: Fran Jović (Zagreb)

16 October 2021 12	Rijeka	3–3	Dinamo Zagreb	Rijeka
17:05 CEST (UTC+02:00)	Drmić 7' 38'; Velkovski 41' (yellow card) 64'	Report	Leovac (yellow card) 37'; Franjić (yellow card) 40'; Petković 58' (pen.) 65' (pen.); Menalo (yellow card) 71'; Oršić (yellow card) 76'; Andrić 82'	Stadium: Rujevica; Attendance: 6,248; Referee: Igor Pajač (Sveti Ivan Zelina)

20 October 2021 4	Rijeka	1–2	Lokomotiva	Rijeka
17:00 CEST (UTC+02:00)	Escoval (yellow card) 26'; Obregón (yellow card) 64'; Jurišić (yellow card) 67'; Drmić 82'	Report	Milićević 15'; Dabro (yellow card) 28' (goal) 58'; Çokaj (yellow card) 36'; Cipetić (yellow card) 88'	Stadium: Rujevica; Attendance: 2,361; Referee: Dario Kulušić (Šibenik)

24 October 2021 13	Lokomotiva	0–2	Rijeka	Zagreb
17:30 CEST (UTC+02:00)	Kačavenda (yellow card) 70'	Report	Abass (yellow card) 41'; Murić 45+1'; Gnezda Čerin (yellow card) 51'; Drmić 64' (penalty missed) 81'; Smolčić (yellow card) 73'	Stadium: Kranjčevićeva; Attendance: 571; Referee: Dario Bel (Osijek)

7 November 2021 15	Šibenik	0–1	Rijeka	Šibenik
17:30 CET (UTC+01:00)	Cvetković (yellow card) 27'	Report	Smolčić 45+1' (yellow card) 90+2'; Krešić (yellow card) 74'; Pavičić (yellow card) 89'	Stadium: Šubićevac; Attendance: 557; Referee: Ante Čuljak (Zagreb)

21 November 2021 16	Rijeka	2–3	Hajduk Split	Rijeka
17:30 CET (UTC+01:00)	Drmić 54'; Murić 78' (pen.); Ampem (yellow card) 81'	Report	Livaja 45' (yellow card) 45' (goal) 82' (pen.); Simić (yellow card) 72'; Katić (yellow card) 77'; Mlakar 90+7'	Stadium: Rujevica; Attendance: 6,578; Referee: Tihomir Pejin (Donji Miholjac)

27 November 2021 17	Slaven Belupo	1–2	Rijeka	Koprivnica
17:05 CET (UTC+01:00)	Caimacov 74'; Hadžić (penalty missed) 86'	Report	Krstanović 51' (o.g.); Drmić 71'; Selahi (yellow card) 73'; Smolčić (yellow card) 85'	Stadium: Gradski; Attendance: 387; Referee: Zdenko Lovrić (Đakovo)

4 December 2021 18	Rijeka	4–1	Hrvatski Dragovoljac	Rijeka
17:05 CET (UTC+01:00)	Gnezda Čerin (yellow card) 8'; Obregón 16'; Bušnja (yellow card) 38'; Murić 44' 47' 80'	Report	Bagadur (yellow card) 52'; Petković 67'	Stadium: Rujevica; Attendance: Behind closed doors Referee: Jakov Titlić (Hrvace)

8 December 2021 14	Rijeka	0–0	Osijek	Rijeka
17:00 CET (UTC+01:00)	Drmić (yellow card) 18'; Abass (yellow card) 43'	Report	Škorić (yellow card) 18'; Topčagić (yellow card) 24'; Fiolić (yellow card) 25'	Stadium: Rujevica; Attendance: 3,631; Referee: Dario Kulušić (Šibenik)

11 December 2021 19	Rijeka	1–2	Gorica	Rijeka
17:05 CET (UTC+01:00)	Ampem (yellow card) 17' (yellow-red card) 34'; Galović (yellow card) 30'; Drmić 78'; Selahi (yellow card) 80'	Report	Doka (yellow card) 42'; Lovrić 64'; Delfi 76'; Mitrović (yellow card) 80'; Steenvoorden (yellow card) 82'; Brodić (yellow card) 86'	Stadium: Rujevica; Attendance: 3,082; Referee: Dario Bel (Osijek)

18 December 2021 20	Rijeka	1–0	Istra 1961	Rijeka
17:05 CET (UTC+01:00)	Obregón 82'	Report		Stadium: Rujevica; Attendance: 3,255; Referee: Jakov Titlić (Hrvace)

30 January 2022 21	Dinamo Zagreb	2–0	Rijeka	Zagreb
17:30 CET (UTC+01:00)	Šutalo 21'; Oršić 42'; Tolić (yellow card) 84'	Report	Vučkić (yellow card) 8'; Čestić (yellow card) 45+4'	Stadium: Maksimir; Attendance: 4,174; Referee: Igor Pajač (Sveti Ivan Zelina)

5 February 2022 22	Rijeka	3–2	Lokomotiva	Rijeka
17:30 CET (UTC+01:00)	Murić 25' 39'; Solano (yellow card) 37'; Vučkić 60'; Čestić (yellow card) 85'; Vuk (yellow card) 90+3'	Report	Çokaj (yellow card) 45'; Mersinaj (yellow card) 56'; Dabro 58'; Kačavenda (yellow card) 68'; Kulenović 79' (yellow card) 90'	Stadium: Rujevica; Attendance: 2,855; Referee: Duje Strukan (Split)

13 February 2022 23	Osijek	1–0	Rijeka	Osijek
17:30 CET (UTC+01:00)	Fiolić (yellow card) 16'; Čestić 85' (o.g.); Brlek (yellow card) 89'	Report	Čestić (yellow card) 29'; Drmić (yellow card) 48'; Abass (yellow card) 87' (yellow-red card) 90+3'	Stadium: Gradski Vrt; Attendance: 3,406; Referee: Fran Jović (Zagreb)

20 February 2022 24	Rijeka	4–2	Šibenik	Rijeka
15:00 CET (UTC+01:00)	Selahi 16'; Vučkić 34' 66'; Murić 62'; Bušnja (yellow card) 90+1'	Report	Bačelić-Grgić (yellow card) 22'; Ćurić 70'; Attys 84'; Skorup (yellow card) 90'	Stadium: Rujevica; Attendance: 3,084; Referee: Zdenko Lovrić (Đakovo)

26 February 2022 25	Hajduk Split	1–3	Rijeka	Split
18:00 CET (UTC+01:00)	Grgić (yellow card) 35'; N. Kalinić (yellow card) 38'; Livaja 69'; Biuk (yellow card) 90'; Fossati (yellow card) 90+1'	Report	Drmić 17'; Vučkić 33'; Smolčić (yellow card) 38'; Solano (yellow card) 41'; Ampem (yellow card) 63'; Krešić 86'	Stadium: Poljud; Attendance: 11,453; Referee: Fran Jović (Zagreb)

5 March 2022 26	Rijeka	3–0	Slaven Belupo	Rijeka
17:05 CET (UTC+01:00)	Ampem (yellow card) 43'; Vučkić 55'; Drmić 70'; Gnezda Čerin 79'	Report	Marina (yellow card) 66'; Soldo (yellow card) 70'	Stadium: Rujevica; Attendance: 3,421; Referee: Duje Strukan (Split)

13 March 2022 27	Hrvatski Dragovoljac	2–1	Rijeka	Zagreb
15:00 CET (UTC+01:00)	Karrica (yellow card) 13'; K. Perić 24' 50'	Report	Ampem 74'; Smolčić (yellow card) 81'	Stadium: Kranjčevićeva; Attendance: 320; Referee: Mario Zebec (Cestica)

19 March 2022 28	Gorica	1–0	Rijeka	Velika Gorica
15:00 CET (UTC+01:00)	Da Cruz (yellow card) 55' (yellow-red card) 60'; Čestić 73' (o.g.); Muhammed (yellow card) 90+8'	Report	Ampem (yellow card) 26'; Gnezda Čerin (yellow card) 90+1'	Stadium: Radnik; Attendance: 1,150; Referee: Tihomir Pejin (Donji Miholjac)

2 April 2022 29	Istra 1961	0–2	Rijeka	Pula
19:05 CEST (UTC+02:00)	Galilea (yellow card) 11'; Perera (yellow card) 65'; Mahmoud (yellow card) 76'; Serderov (yellow card) 90+1'	Report	Vukčević (yellow card) 16'; Vučkić 29' 87'	Stadium: Aldo Drosina; Attendance: 2,170; Referee: Duje Strukan (Split)

10 April 2022 30	Rijeka	1–2	Dinamo Zagreb	Rijeka
20:00 CEST (UTC+02:00)	Gnezda Čerin 6'; Krešić (yellow card) 12' (red card) 90+4'; Lepinjica (yellow card) 61'; Smolčić (yellow card) 62'; Bušnja (yellow card) 88'	Report	Emreli 80' (yellow card) 88'; Ademi 86' (yellow card) 86'; Andrić (yellow card) 90+2'	Stadium: Rujevica; Attendance: 7,364; Referee: Mario Zebec (Cestica)

16 April 2022 31	Lokomotiva	2–1	Rijeka	Zagreb
19:10 CEST (UTC+02:00)	Milićević (yellow card) 11'; Stojković 38'; Kačavenda 46'; Cipetić (yellow card) 77'; Salihu (yellow card) 87'	Report	Drmić 90+2'	Stadium: Kranjčevićeva; Attendance: 885; Referee: Dario Bel (Osijek)

23 April 2022 32	Rijeka	3–1	Osijek	Rijeka
20:00 CEST (UTC+02:00)	Murić 19' (pen.); Velkovski (yellow card) 32'; Vučkić 36'; Drmić 48'	Report	Kleinheisler (yellow card) 56'; Mance 65'	Stadium: Rujevica; Attendance: 4,516; Referee: Mario Zebec (Cestica)

30 April 2022 33	Šibenik	3–5	Rijeka	Šibenik
19:05 CEST (UTC+02:00)	Mesa 27'; Grezda 36'; Marin (yellow card) 58'; Bilić 80'	Report	Drmić 12' 69' 72'; Selahi (yellow card) 31'; Pavičić 37'; Krešić 49'	Stadium: Šubićevac; Attendance: 778; Referee: Ante Čuljak (Zagreb)

8 May 2022 34	Rijeka	0–3	Hajduk Split	Rijeka
17:00 CEST (UTC+02:00)	Krešić (yellow card) 12'; Drmić (red card) 55'; Smolčić (yellow card) 73'	Report	Livaja 13' (pen.) 37'; Mikanović 41'; Lovrencsics (yellow card) 85'	Stadium: Rujevica; Attendance: 7,485; Referee: Dario Bel (Osijek)

14 May 2022 35	Slaven Belupo	2–2	Rijeka	Koprivnica
17:00 CEST (UTC+02:00)	Bosec (yellow card) 27'; Krstanović (yellow card) 41' (goal) 56' (pen.) 59'; Marina (yellow card) 49'; Crnac (yellow card) 73'	Report	Gnezda Čerin (yellow card) 3'; Obregón 49'; Vukčević 79'	Stadium: Gradski; Attendance: 576; Referee: Jakov Titlić (Hrvace)

21 May 2022 36	Rijeka	1–0	Hrvatski Dragovoljac	Rijeka
15:00 CEST (UTC+02:00)	Obregón 2'; Smolčić (yellow card) 18'	Report		Stadium: Rujevica; Attendance: 2,511; Referee: Igor Pajač (Sveti Ivan Zelina)

=== Croatian Cup ===
21 September 2021 R1	Pitomača	0–7	Rijeka	Pitomača
15:00 CEST (UTC+02:00)	Reščić (yellow card) 74'	Report	Bušnja 4'; Vučkić 36' 54'; Vuk 49'; Lepinjica (yellow card) 52'; Abass 71' 90'; Obregón 88' (pen.)	Stadium: NK Pitomača; Attendance: 1,500; Referee: Zdenko Lovrić (Đakovo)

13 November 2021 R2	Oriolik	0–6	Rijeka	Oriovac
14:00 CET (UTC+01:00)	Marušić (yellow card) 18'	Report	Abass 45+2' (pen.); Bušnja 48' 69' (penalty missed) 84' 84'; Obregón 56' (pen.); Krešić (yellow card) 65'; Stanić 89'	Stadium: NK Oriolik; Attendance: 600; Referee: Marko Cestarić (Sisak)

1 December 2021 QF	Dinamo Zagreb	1–3	Rijeka	Zagreb
18:30 CET (UTC+01:00)	Ristovski (yellow card) 69'; Tolić 73'	Report	Obregón 27'; Drmić 30'; Selahi (yellow card) 36'; Labrović (yellow card) 85'; Murić 90+7'	Stadium: Maksimir; Attendance: 1,363; Referee: Mario Zebec (Cestica)

9 March 2022 SF	Rijeka	3–2 (a.e.t.)	Osijek	Rijeka
18:00 CET (UTC+01:00)	Krešić 20'; Drmić (yellow card) 38' (goal) 76'; Selahi (yellow card) 68'; Ampem (yellow card) 105'; Čestić (yellow card) 111'; Merkulov 118'	Report	Fiolić (yellow card) 21'; Caktaš 42'; Leovac (yellow card) 65'; Kleinheisler (yellow card) 68'; Mance 90+2' (yellow card) 90+5'; Hiroš (yellow card) 107'; Žaper (yellow card) 107'; Fućak (yellow card) 111'	Stadium: Rujevica; Attendance: 7,225; Referee: Duje Strukan (Split)

26 May 2022 Final	Rijeka	1–3	Hajduk Split	Split
19:00 CEST (UTC+02:00)	Drmić 13'; Smolčić (yellow card) 26' (yellow-red card) 41'; Selahi (yellow card) 35'	Report	Ferro 24'; Fossati (yellow card) 26'; Melnjak 36' 56'; Grgić (yellow card) 45'	Stadium: Poljud; Attendance: 29,411; Referee: Fran Jović (Zagreb)

=== UEFA Europa Conference League ===
22 July 2021 QR2	Gżira United (Malta)	0–2	(Croatia) Rijeka	Ta'Qali, Malta
19:00 CEST (UTC+02:00)	Pisani (yellow card) 60'; Davis (yellow card) 68'; Mendoza (yellow card) 85'; Xuereb (yellow card) 90+4'	Report	Liber (yellow card) 30'; Bušnja 57'; Lepinjica (yellow card) 62' (yellow-red card) 87'; Escoval (yellow card) 72'; Ampem 77'; Bušnja (yellow card) 90'	Stadium: Centenary Stadium; Attendance: 234; Referee: Neil Doyle (Republic of Ireland)

29 July 2021 QR2	Rijeka (Croatia)	1–0 (3–0 agg.)	(Malta) Gżira United	Rijeka, Croatia
20:00 CEST (UTC+02:00)	Drmić 27'; Galović (yellow card) 89'	Report	Davis (yellow card) 35'; Haber (yellow card) 61'; Mentz (yellow card) 85'	Stadium: Rujevica; Attendance: 2,187; Referee: Veaceslav Banari (Moldova)

5 August 2021 QR3	Hibernian (Scotland)	1–1	(Croatia) Rijeka	Edinburgh, Scotland
19:45 BST (UTC+01:00)	Boyle 67'; Stevenson (yellow card) 70'; MacKay (yellow card) 82'	Report	Smolčić (yellow card) 44'; Ampem 61'; Vukčević (yellow card) 66'; Abass (yellow card) 69'	Stadium: Easter Road; Attendance: 5,600; Referee: Juan Martínez Munuera (Spain)

12 August 2021 QR3	Rijeka (Croatia)	4–1 (5–2 agg.)	(Scotland) Hibernian	Rijeka, Croatia
20:00 CEST (UTC+02:00)	Pavičić (yellow card) 26' (goal) 36'; Abass 68'; McGinn 72' (o.g.); Ampem (yellow card) 83'; Bušnja 90+3'	Report	McGregor (yellow card) 13' (yellow-red card) 66'; Newell (yellow card) 18'; Magennis 56'; Boyle (yellow card) 68'; Doyle-Hayes (yellow card) 83'	Stadium: Rujevica; Attendance: 4,077; Referee: Donatas Rumšas (Lithuania)

19 August 2021 PO	PAOK (Greece)	1–1	(Croatia) Rijeka	Thessaloniki, Greece
21:00 EEST (UTC+03:00)	Kurtić (yellow card) 86'; Galešić 90+4' (o.g.)	Report	Gnezda Čerin (yellow card) 14'; Lepinjica 33'; Galović (yellow card) 68'	Stadium: Toumba Stadium; Attendance: 8,091; Referee: Jérôme Brisard (France)

26 August 2021 PO	Rijeka (Croatia)	0–2 (1–3 agg.)	(Greece) PAOK	Rijeka, Croatia
20:00 CEST (UTC+02:00)	Abass (yellow card) 14'; Galović (yellow card) 50'; Drmić (yellow card) 74'	Report	El Kaddouri 11'; Lucas Taylor (yellow card) 17'; Świderski (yellow card) 60'; Murg 80' (yellow card) 89'	Stadium: Rujevica; Attendance: 6,722; Referee: Serhiy Boiko (Ukraine)

=== Friendlies ===
==== Pre-season ====
23 June 2021 Friendly	Rijeka (Croatia)	1–0	(Slovenia) Domžale	Rijeka, Croatia
19:00 CEST (UTC+02:00)	Mudražija 30'	Report		Stadium: Rujevica (training ground); Attendance: Behind closed doors Referee: Ivan Bebek (Rijeka)

26 June 2021 Friendly	Rijeka	3–0	Hrvatski Dragovoljac	Rijeka
19:00 CEST (UTC+02:00)	Liber 32'; Galović 40'; Bilić 72'; M. Frigan (yellow card) 82'	Report		Stadium: Rujevica (training ground); Attendance: Behind closed doors Referee: Marin Rožman (Rijeka)

30 June 2021 Friendly	Rijeka (Croatia)	2–2	(Slovakia) Žilina	Kranjska Gora, Slovenia
18:00 CEST (UTC+02:00)	Murić 12' (pen.); Bušnja 73'	Report	Bichakhchyan 14' (pen.) 59'	Stadium: Igralište Čičare; Attendance: Behind closed doors Referee: Neid Kajtazović (Kranj)

3 July 2021 Friendly	Wolfsberger AC (Austria)	1–3	(Croatia) Rijeka	Velden am Wörthersee, Austria
15:30 CEST (UTC+02:00)	Vizinger 55'	Report	Murić 16'; Bušnja 36'; Ristovski 89'	Stadium: Waldenarena; Attendance: Behind closed doors Referee: Andreas Oberbucher (Klagenfurt)

8 July 2021 Friendly	Rijeka (Croatia)	3–1	(Slovenia) Triglav Kranj	Kranjska Gora, Slovenia
18:00 CEST (UTC+02:00)	Lepinjica 44'; Hodža 53'; Bristrić 70'	Report	Tatili 15'	Stadium: Igralište Čičare; Attendance: Behind closed doors Referee: Marko Podgoršek (Slovenia)

9 July 2021 Friendly	Rijeka (Croatia)	4–3	(Hungary) MTK Budapest	Kranjska Gora, Slovenia
16:00 CEST (UTC+02:00)	Escoval 27'; Abass 36'; Murić 39'; Galović 56'	Report	Ferreira 21'; Grozav 58'; Kata 68'	Stadium: Igralište Čičare; Attendance: Behind closed doors Referee: Andrej Žnidaršič (Slovenia)

==== On-season (2021) ====
2 September 2021 Friendly	Klana	0–9	Rijeka	Klana
16:00 CEST (UTC+02:00)		Report	Escoval 22'; Vuk 24' 34' 56' (pen.) 90'; Obregón 31' 60'; Vukčević 36'; Mudražija 38'	Stadium: Igralište Grašćina; Attendance: 500; Referee: Luka Milković (Rijeka)

3 September 2021 Friendly	Rijeka (Croatia)	3–0	(Slovenia) Koper	Rijeka, Croatia
19:00 CEST (UTC+02:00)	Drmić 24'; Grudina 34' (o.g.); Obregón 70'	Report		Stadium: Rujevica; Attendance: Behind closed doors Referee: Ivan Bebek (Rijeka)

14 September 2021 Friendly	Rijeka	5–2	Maksimir	Rijeka
18:00 CEST (UTC+02:00)	Braut 17'; Vuk 18'; Lepinjica 38'; Vučkić 50'; Abass 79'	Report	Velkovski 52' (o.g.); J. Starčić 82'	Stadium: Rujevica (training ground); Attendance: Behind closed doors Referee: Marin Rožman (Rijeka)

7 October 2021 Friendly	Rijeka	3–0	Rudeš	Rijeka
17:00 CEST (UTC+02:00)	Vuk 26'; Bilić 39'; Bodetić 85'	Report		Stadium: Rujevica (training ground); Attendance: Behind closed doors Referee: Antonio Melnjak (Rijeka)

8 October 2021 Friendly	Rijeka (Croatia)	6–1	(Slovenia) Olimpija Ljubljana	Rijeka, Croatia
20:00 CEST (UTC+02:00)	Drmić 24' 29' 59'; Vučkić 55'; Obregón 80'; Mudražija 83'	Report	Tall 52'	Stadium: Kantrida; Attendance: 5,000; Referee: Luka Milković (Rijeka)

==== Mid-season ====
12 January 2022 Friendly	Rijeka (Croatia)	2–3	(Slovenia) Domžale	Umag, Croatia
14:30 CET (UTC+01:00)	Murić 8'; Abass (yellow card) 27'; Drmić 35' (pen.); Selahi (yellow card) 42'; Bušnja (penalty missed) 87'	Report	Jakupović 10' 33'; Vuk (yellow card) 27'; Zogović 64' (yellow card) 69'; Strajnar (yellow card) 80'	Stadium: Stella Maris Sports Center; Referee: Marin Vidulin (Kanfanar)

15 January 2022 Friendly	Rijeka (Croatia)	3–0	(Slovenia) Bravo	Umag, Croatia
14:30 CET (UTC+01:00)	Lepinjica 36'; Murić 42'; Abass 47' (penalty missed) 86'	Report		Stadium: Stella Maris Sports Center

19 January 2022 Friendly	Rijeka (Croatia)	4–0	(Slovenia) Gorica	Umag, Croatia
14:30 CET (UTC+01:00)	Obregón 1'; Vuk 29' (pen.), 35'; Murić 77'	Report		Stadium: Stella Maris Sports Center; Referee: Daniel Starčević (Pula)

20 January 2022 Friendly	Rijeka (Croatia)	Cancelled	(Hungary) Budafoki	Umag, Croatia
14:30 CET (UTC+01:00)		Report		Stadium: Stella Maris Sports Center

21 January 2022 Friendly	Rijeka (Croatia)	1–1	(Czech Republic) Slovácko	Umag, Croatia
13:00 CET (UTC+01:00)	Drmić 55'	Report	Havlík 6'; Kohút (yellow card) 66'	Stadium: Stella Maris Sports Center; Referee: Mateo Čalić (Marčana)

26 January 2022 Friendly	Rijeka (Croatia)	3–0	(Slovenia) Triglav Kranj	Rijeka, Croatia
17:00 CET (UTC+01:00)	Drmić 46' 56' 58'	Report		Stadium: Rujevica; Attendance: Behind closed doors Referee: Marin Rožman (Rijeka)

==== On-season (2022) ====
10 February 2022 Friendly	Rijeka (Croatia)	0–1	(Slovenia) Ilirija 1911	Rijeka, Croatia
14:00 CET (UTC+01:00)		Report	Golob 30'	Stadium: Rujevica (training ground); Attendance: Behind closed doors Referee: Vedran Jelenčić (Kastav)

25 March 2022 Friendly	Rijeka (Croatia)	5–0	(Slovenia) Celje	Rijeka, Croatia
16:00 CET (UTC+01:00)	Abass 3'; Murić 16'; Krešić 53'; Stojković 56'; Drmić 74'	Report		Stadium: Rujevica; Attendance: Behind closed doors Referee: Marin Rožman (Rijeka)

27 April 2022 Friendly	Rijeka	5–2	Međimurje	Rijeka
14:00 CEST (UTC+02:00)	Bušnja 25' 38'; Obregón 40'; Valjan 53'; Matić 59'	Report	Škvorc 30'; Čehov 64'	Stadium: Rujevica (training ground); Attendance: Behind closed doors

18 May 2022 Global Tour for Peace	Rijeka (Croatia)	1–1	Ukraine	Rijeka, Croatia
18:00 CEST (UTC+02:00)	Drmić 37'	Report	Harmash 24'; Sydorchuk (yellow card) 57'; Kacharaba (yellow card) 85'	Stadium: Rujevica; Attendance: 2,200; Referee: Ivan Bebek (Rijeka)

== Player seasonal records ==
Updated 26 May 2022. Competitive matches only.

=== Goals ===
Rank	Name	League	Europe	Cup	Total
1	(Switzerland) Josip Drmić	21	1	3	25
2	(Croatia) Robert Murić	11	–	1	12
2	(Slovenia) Haris Vučkić	10	–	2	12
4	(Croatia) Denis Bušnja	2	2	4	8
5	(Colombia) Jorge Obregón	4	–	3	7
5	(Ghana) Issah Abass	3	1	3	7
7	(Croatia) Domagoj Pavičić	4	1	–	5
7	(Ghana) Prince Ampem	3	2	–	5
9	(Croatia) Anton Krešić	3	–	1	4
10	(Slovenia) Adam Gnezda Čerin	2	–	–	2
10	(Albania) Lindon Selahi	2	–	–	2
10	(Croatia) Ivan Lepinjica	1	1	–	2
13	(Croatia) Hrvoje Smolčić	1	–	–	1
13	(Croatia) Ivan Tomečak	1	–	–	1
13	(North Macedonia) Darko Velkovski	1	–	–	1
13	(Montenegro) Andrija Vukčević	1	–	–	1
13	(Russia) Mikhail Merkulov	–	–	1	1
13	(Bosnia and Herzegovina) Mato Stanić	–	–	1	1
13	(Croatia) Matej Vuk	–	–	1	1
Own goals		1	1	–	2
TOTALS		71	9	20	100

Source: Competitive matches

=== Clean sheets ===
Rank	Name	League	Europe	Cup	Total
1	(Croatia) Nediljko Labrović	7	2	1	10
2	(Bosnia and Herzegovina) Martin Zlomislić	2	–	1	3
TOTALS		9	2	2	13

Source: Competitive matches

=== Disciplinary record ===
Number	Position	Player	1. HNL			Europe			Croatian Cup			Total		
Number	Position	Player	Yellow card	(yellow card) (yellow-red card)	Red card	Yellow card	(yellow card) (yellow-red card)	Red card	Yellow card	(yellow card) (yellow-red card)	Red card	Yellow card	(yellow card) (yellow-red card)	Red card
1	GK	(Croatia) Nediljko Labrović	0	0	0	0	0	0	1	0	0	1	0	0
4	DF	(Croatia) Nino Galović	2	0	0	3	0	0	0	0	0	5	0	0
6	DF	(Serbia) Sava-Arangel Čestić	3	0	0	0	0	0	1	0	0	4	0	0
7	MF	(Croatia) Robert Murić	1	0	0	0	0	0	0	0	0	1	0	0
8	MF	(Croatia) Adrian Liber	0	0	0	1	0	0	0	0	0	1	0	0
9	FW	(Colombia) Jorge Obregón	2	0	0	0	0	0	0	0	0	2	0	0
10	MF	(Croatia) Domagoj Pavičić	2	0	0	1	0	0	0	0	0	3	0	0
11	MF	(Ghana) Prince Ampem	6	1	0	1	0	0	1	0	0	8	1	0
12	DF	(Montenegro) Andrija Vukčević	2	0	0	1	0	0	0	0	0	3	0	0
13	MF	(Croatia) Ivan Lepinjica	2	0	0	0	1	0	1	0	0	3	1	0
14	DF	(North Macedonia) Darko Velkovski	3	0	0	0	0	0	0	0	0	3	0	0
15	DF	(Croatia) Anton Krešić	6	0	1	0	0	0	1	0	0	7	0	1
16	MF	(Slovenia) Adam Gnezda Čerin	4	0	0	1	0	0	0	0	0	5	0	0
17	MF	(Croatia) Matej Vuk	1	0	0	0	0	0	0	0	0	1	0	0
18	FW	(Switzerland) Josip Drmić	3	0	1	1	0	0	1	0	0	5	0	1
19	MF	(Slovenia) Haris Vučkić	2	0	0	0	0	0	0	0	0	2	0	0
20	DF	(Colombia) Andrés Solano	2	0	0	0	0	0	0	0	0	2	0	0
22	DF	(Croatia) Roko Jurišić	1	0	0	0	0	0	0	0	0	1	0	0
23	MF	(Croatia) Denis Bušnja	4	0	0	1	0	0	0	0	0	5	0	0
24	MF	(Bosnia and Herzegovina) Mato Stanić	1	0	0	0	0	0	0	0	0	1	0	0
26	DF	(Portugal) João Escoval	2	0	0	1	0	0	0	0	0	3	0	0
30	MF	(Albania) Lindon Selahi	5	0	0	0	0	0	3	0	0	8	0	0
33	FW	(Ghana) Issah Abass	3	1	0	2	0	0	0	0	0	5	1	0
36	DF	(Croatia) Hrvoje Smolčić	9	0	0	1	0	0	0	1	0	10	1	0
TOTALS			66	2	2	14	1	0	9	1	0	89	4	2

Source: nk-rijeka.hr

=== Appearances and goals ===
Number	Position	Player	Apps	Goals	Apps	Goals	Apps	Goals	Apps	Goals
Number	Position	Player	Total		1. HNL (Note: First number represents appearances in starting eleven, while the second number indicates a substitute appearance.)		Conference League		Croatian Cup	
1	GK	(Croatia) Nediljko Labrović	30	0	23+0	0	3+0	0	4+0	0
2	DF	(Croatia) Filip Braut	4	0	2+0	0	0+1	0	1+0	0
3	DF	(Russia) Mikhail Merkulov	6	1	1+3	0	0+0	0	1+1	1
4	DF	(Croatia) Nino Galović	18	0	7+3	0	6+0	0	2+0	0
5	DF	(Croatia) Niko Galešić	5	0	2+1	0	0+2	0	0+0	0
6	DF	(Serbia) Sava-Arangel Čestić	9	0	5+3	0	0+0	0	1+0	0
7	MF	(Croatia) Robert Murić	37	12	27+3	11	2+1	0	0+4	1
8	MF	(Croatia) Adrian Liber	17	0	4+6	0	2+3	0	1+1	0
9	FW	(Colombia) Jorge Obregón	37	7	6+21	4	1+5	0	4+0	3
10	MF	(Croatia) Domagoj Pavičić	39	5	23+7	4	6+0	1	3+0	0
11	MF	(Ghana) Prince Ampem	42	5	24+8	3	6+0	2	2+2	0
12	DF	(Montenegro) Andrija Vukčević	42	1	24+9	1	5+1	0	3+0	0
13	MF	(Croatia) Ivan Lepinjica	31	2	8+14	1	3+1	1	2+3	0
14	DF	(North Macedonia) Darko Velkovski	33	1	29+1	1	0+0	0	3+0	0
15	DF	(Croatia) Anton Krešić	36	4	24+4	3	3+1	0	4+0	1
16	MF	(Slovenia) Adam Gnezda Čerin	37	2	22+8	2	3+1	0	3+0	0
17	MF	(Croatia) Matej Vuk	21	1	4+14	0	0+1	0	2+0	1
18	FW	(Switzerland) Josip Drmić	37	25	29+1	21	4+0	1	3+0	3
19	FW	(Slovenia) Haris Vučkić	31	12	19+8	10	0+1	0	2+1	2
20	MF	(Croatia) Robert Mudražija	4	0	2+1	0	0+0	0	1+0	0
20	DF	(Colombia) Andrés Solano	13	0	10+2	0	0+0	0	0+1	0
22	DF	(Croatia) Roko Jurišić	6	0	0+4	0	0+1	0	0+1	0
23	MF	(Croatia) Denis Bušnja	33	8	3+21	2	0+5	2	3+1	4
24	MF	(Bosnia and Herzegovina) Mato Stanić	10	1	2+5	0	0+0	0	0+3	1
26	DF	(Portugal) João Escoval	16	0	7+1	0	5+0	0	1+2	0
27	DF	(Croatia) Ivan Tomečak	21	1	13+1	1	6+0	0	1+0	0
28	DF	(Croatia) Ivan Smolčić	2	0	0+0	0	0+0	0	0+2	0
30	MF	(Albania) Lindon Selahi	36	2	28+2	2	0+2	0	3+1	0
32	GK	(Croatia) Andrej Prskalo	7	0	4+0	0	3+0	0	0+0	0
33	FW	(Ghana) Issah Abass	34	7	16+10	3	5+0	1	1+2	3
36	DF	(Croatia) Hrvoje Smolčić	28	1	20+2	1	3+0	0	3+0	0
98	GK	(Bosnia and Herzegovina) Martin Zlomislić	10	0	9+0	0	0+0	0	1+0	0

Source: nk-rijeka.hr

=== Suspensions ===
Date Incurred	Competition	Player	Games Missed	Reason
22 Jul 2021	UECL	(Croatia) Ivan Lepinjica	1	(yellow card) (yellow-red card)
26 Aug 2021	UECL	(Croatia) Nino Galović	1	Yellow card
2 Oct 2021	1. HNL	(Croatia) Anton Krešić	1	Yellow card
7 Nov 2021	1. HNL	(Croatia) Hrvoje Smolčić	1	Yellow card
21 Nov 2021	1. HNL	(Ghana) Prince Ampem	1	Yellow card
27 Nov 2021	1. HNL	(Albania) Lindon Selahi	1	Yellow card
8 Dec 2021	1. HNL	(Ghana) Issah Abass	1	Yellow card
11 Dec 2021	1. HNL	(Ghana) Prince Ampem	1	(yellow card) (yellow-red card)
13 Feb 2022	1. HNL	(Serbia) Sava-Arangel Čestić	1	Yellow card
13 Feb 2022	1. HNL	(Switzerland) Josip Drmić	1	Yellow card
13 Feb 2022	1. HNL	(Ghana) Issah Abass	1	(yellow card) (yellow-red card)
20 Feb 2022	1. HNL	(Croatia) Denis Bušnja	1	Yellow card
13 Mar 2022	1. HNL	(Croatia) Hrvoje Smolčić	1	Yellow card
19 Mar 2022	1. HNL	(Ghana) Prince Ampem	1	Yellow card
19 Mar 2022	1. HNL	(Slovenia) Adam Gnezda Čerin	1	Yellow card
10 Apr 2022	1. HNL	(Croatia) Anton Krešić	2	Red card
23 Apr 2022	1. HNL	(North Macedonia) Darko Velkovski	1	Yellow card
8 May 2022	1. HNL	(Switzerland) Josip Drmić	2	Red card
8 May 2022	1. HNL	(Croatia) Anton Krešić	1	Yellow card
21 May 2022	1. HNL	(Croatia) Hrvoje Smolčić	1	Yellow card
26 May 2022	Cup	(Croatia) Hrvoje Smolčić	1	(yellow card) (yellow-red card)

=== Penalties ===
For
Date	Competition	Player	Opposition	Scored?
17 Jul 2021	1. HNL	(Croatia) Robert Murić	Gorica	✓
25 Jul 2021	1. HNL	(Croatia) Domagoj Pavičić	Istra 1961	✗
22 Aug 2021	1. HNL	(Switzerland) Josip Drmić	Šibenik	✓
21 Sep 2021	Cup	(Colombia) Jorge Obregón	Pitomača	✓
26 Sep 2021	1. HNL	(Croatia) Robert Murić	Gorica	✓
24 Oct 2021	1. HNL	(Switzerland) Josip Drmić	Lokomotiva	✗
13 Nov 2021	Cup	(Ghana) Issah Abass	Oriolik	✓
13 Nov 2021	Cup	(Colombia) Jorge Obregón	Oriolik	✓
13 Nov 2021	Cup	(Croatia) Denis Bušnja	Oriolik	✗
21 Nov 2021	1. HNL	(Croatia) Robert Murić	Hajduk Split	✓
23 Apr 2022	1. HNL	(Croatia) Robert Murić	Osijek	✓
Against
Date	Competition	Goalkeeper	Opposition	Scored?
17 Sep 2021	1. HNL	(Croatia) Andrej Prskalo	H. Dragovoljac	✓
26 Sep 2021	1. HNL	(Bosnia and Herzegovina) Martin Zlomislić	Gorica	✓
16 Oct 2021	1. HNL	(Bosnia and Herzegovina) Martin Zlomislić	Dinamo Zagreb	✓
16 Oct 2021	1. HNL	(Bosnia and Herzegovina) Martin Zlomislić	Dinamo Zagreb	✓
21 Nov 2021	1. HNL	(Bosnia and Herzegovina) Martin Zlomislić	Hajduk Split	✓
27 Nov 2021	1. HNL	(Bosnia and Herzegovina) Martin Zlomislić	Slaven Belupo	✗
8 May 2022	1. HNL	(Croatia) Nediljko Labrović	Hajduk Split	✓
14 May 2022	1. HNL	(Croatia) Nediljko Labrović	Slaven Belupo	✓

== Transfers ==
=== In ===
Date	Pos.	Player	Moving from	Type	Fee	Ref.
31 May 2021	CB	(Bosnia and Herzegovina) Jasmin Čeliković	(Bosnia and Herzegovina) Željezničar	Return from loan	—N/a	
9 Jun 2021	GK	(Croatia) Nediljko Labrović	(Croatia) Šibenik	Transfer	Free	
9 Jun 2021	RW	(Ghana) Prince Ampem	(Croatia) Šibenik	Transfer	Free	
15 Jun 2021	CB	(Croatia) Ivan Smolčić	(Croatia) Orijent 1919	Return from loan	—N/a	
15 Jun 2021	CB	(Croatia) Marko Putnik	(Croatia) Orijent 1919	Return from loan	—N/a	
15 Jun 2021	DM	(Croatia) Veldin Hodža	(Croatia) Orijent 1919	Return from loan	—N/a	
15 Jun 2021	LW	(Croatia) Matej Vuk	(Croatia) Istra 1961	Return from loan	—N/a	
15 Jun 2021	CF	(North Macedonia) Milan Ristovski	(Slovakia) Spartak Trnava	Return from loan	—N/a	
21 Jun 2021	CF	(Bosnia and Herzegovina) Admir Bristrić	(Bosnia and Herzegovina) Sloboda Tuzla	Transfer	€15,000	
28 Jun 2021	LW	(Albania) Bernard Karrica	(Croatia) Dinamo Zagreb	Transfer	Free	
29 Jun 2021	CF	(Ghana) Issah Abass	(Germany) Mainz 05	Loan (until 30/6/2022)	—N/a	
30 Jun 2021	AM	(Spain) Dani Iglesias	(Slovakia) Spartak Trnava	Return from loan	—N/a	
30 Jun 2021	RW	(Croatia) Tomislav Turčin	(Croatia) Dinamo Zagreb II	Return from loan	—N/a	
30 Jun 2021	LW	(Croatia) Denis Bušnja	(Slovakia) Sereď	Return from loan	—N/a	
5 Jul 2021	CF	(Colombia) Jorge Obregón	(Croatia) Varaždin	Transfer	€500,000	
6 Jul 2021	CF	(Switzerland) Josip Drmić	(England) Norwich City	Loan (until 30/6/2022)	—N/a	
9 Jul 2021	GK	(Bosnia and Herzegovina) Martin Zlomislić	Free agent	Transfer	Free	
16 Jul 2021	CB	(Croatia) Anton Krešić	(Italy) Atalanta	Loan (until 30/6/2022; option to buy)	—N/a	
24 Jul 2021	CM	(Albania) Lindon Selahi	(Netherlands) Twente	Transfer	Free	
28 Jul 2021	LB	(Russia) Mikhail Merkulov	(Russia) Rubin Kazan	Transfer	Free	
30 Jul 2021	DM	(Bosnia and Herzegovina) Mato Stanić	(Bosnia and Herzegovina) Široki Brijeg	Transfer	€150,000	
13 Aug 2021	AM	(Slovenia) Haris Vučkić	(Spain) Real Zaragoza	Loan (until 30/6/2022)	—N/a	
31 Dec 2021	GK	(Croatia) Antonio Frigan	(Croatia) Novigrad	Return from loan	—N/a	
8 Jan 2022	CB	(Croatia) Duje Dujmović	(Croatia) Solin	Transfer	Undisclosed	
8 Jan 2022	DM	(Croatia) Marino Kukoč	(Croatia) Split	Transfer	€25,000	
9 Jan 2022	LW	(Albania) Bernard Karrica	(Slovakia) Sereď	Return from loan	—N/a	
10 Jan 2022	CB	(Serbia) Sava-Arangel Čestić	(Germany) 1. FC Köln	Transfer	Free	
11 Jan 2022	CF	(Croatia) Matija Frigan	(Croatia) Orijent 1919	Return from loan	—N/a	
24 Jan 2022	DM	(Bosnia and Herzegovina) Mato Stanić	(Croatia) Hrvatski Dragovoljac	Return from loan	—N/a	
24 Jan 2022	DM	(Croatia) Veldin Hodža	(Croatia) Orijent 1919	Return from loan	—N/a	
31 Jan 2022	RB	(Colombia) Andrés Solano	(Spain) Atlético Madrid B	Transfer	Free	
5 Feb 2022	GK	(Serbia) Aleksa Todorović	(Serbia) Trayal	Transfer	Free	
6 Feb 2022	CM	(Canada) Antoine Coupland	(Canada) Atlético Ottawa	Transfer	Free	
10 Feb 2022	DM	(Spain) Iker Pozo	(England) Manchester City	Loan (until 30/6/2022; option to buy)	—N/a	
15 Feb 2022	CB	(Niger) Djibrilla Ibrahim	(United Arab Emirates) Al-Hilal United	Transfer	Free	
1 Apr 2022	AM	(Serbia) Dennis Stojković	Free agent	Transfer	Free	

Source: Glasilo Hrvatskog nogometnog saveza

=== Out ===
Date	Pos.	Player	Moving to	Type	Fee	Ref.
11 Jun 2021	GK	(Croatia) Ivan Nevistić	(Croatia) Dinamo Zagreb	End of loan	—N/a	
11 Jun 2021	LB	(Croatia) Daniel Štefulj	(Croatia) Dinamo Zagreb	End of loan	—N/a	
15 Jun 2021	LW	(Bosnia and Herzegovina) Luka Menalo	(Croatia) Dinamo Zagreb	End of loan	—N/a	
15 Jun 2021	CF	(Croatia) Sandro Kulenović	(Croatia) Dinamo Zagreb	End of loan	—N/a	
23 Jun 2021	CM	(Bosnia and Herzegovina) Silvio Ilinković	(Bosnia and Herzegovina) Posušje	Loan (until 30/6/2022)	—N/a	
29 Jun 2021	CB	(Bosnia and Herzegovina) Jasmin Čeliković	(Bosnia and Herzegovina) Tuzla City	End of contract	Free	
30 Jun 2021	DM	(Croatia) Luka Capan	(Turkey) Bursaspor	End of contract	Free	
30 Jun 2021	AM	(Croatia) Franko Andrijašević	(Belgium) Gent	End of loan	—N/a	
30 Jun 2021	CF	(Switzerland) Josip Drmić	(England) Norwich City	End of loan	—N/a	
30 Jun 2021	CF	(Central African Republic) Sterling Yatéké	Austria Wien	End of loan	—N/a	
10 Jul 2021	CB	(Croatia) Marko Putnik	(Croatia) Orijent 1919	Loan (until 15/6/2022)	—N/a	
10 Jul 2021	AM	(Croatia) Filip Zrilić	(Croatia) Orijent 1919	Loan (until 15/6/2022)	—N/a	
12 Jul 2021	DM	(Croatia) Veldin Hodža	(Croatia) Orijent 1919	Loan (until 15/6/2022)	—N/a	
12 Jul 2021	CF	(Croatia) Matija Frigan	(Croatia) Orijent 1919	Loan (until 15/6/2022)	—N/a	
15 Jul 2021	CF	(North Macedonia) Milan Ristovski	(Slovakia) Spartak Trnava	Transfer (buying option)	€300,000	
16 Jul 2021	CB	(Croatia) Tino Agić	(Slovenia) Gorica	Loan (until 15/6/2022)	—N/a	
16 Jul 2021	CM	(Bosnia and Herzegovina) Stjepan Lončar	(Hungary) Ferencváros	Transfer	€2,500,000	
4 Aug 2021	RW	(Croatia) Tomislav Turčin	(Croatia) Hrvatski Dragovoljac	Transfer	Free	
27 Aug 2021	GK	(Croatia) Antonio Frigan	(Croatia) Novigrad	Loan (until 30/6/2022)	—N/a	
7 Sep 2021	AM	(Spain) Dani Iglesias	(Slovakia) Sereď	Transfer	Free	
9 Sep 2021	LW	(Albania) Bernard Karrica	(Slovakia) Sereď	Loan (until 30/6/2022)	—N/a	
27 Dec 2021	CM	(Croatia) Robert Mudražija	(Denmark) Copenhagen	End of loan	—N/a	
12 Jan 2022	CB	(Croatia) Ivan Smolčić	(Croatia) Hrvatski Dragovoljac	Transfer	Free	
12 Jan 2022	DM	(Bosnia and Herzegovina) Mato Stanić	(Croatia) Hrvatski Dragovoljac	Loan (until 15/6/2022)	—N/a	
12 Jan 2022	LW	(Albania) Bernard Karrica	(Croatia) Hrvatski Dragovoljac	Loan (until 15/6/2022)	—N/a	
12 Jan 2022	CF	(Bosnia and Herzegovina) Admir Bristrić	(Croatia) Hrvatski Dragovoljac	Loan (until 15/6/2022)	—N/a	
12 Jan 2022	CF	(Croatia) Matija Frigan	(Croatia) Hrvatski Dragovoljac	Loan (until 15/6/2022)	—N/a	
13 Jan 2022	GK	(Nigeria) David Nwolokor	(Slovenia) Aluminij	Loan (until 15/6/2023)	—N/a	
15 Jan 2022	LB	(Croatia) Roko Jurišić	(Croatia) Hrvatski Dragovoljac	Loan (until 15/6/2022)	—N/a	
16 Jan 2022	CB	(Croatia) Niko Galešić	(Croatia) Hrvatski Dragovoljac	Loan (until 15/6/2022)	—N/a	
24 Jan 2022	DM	(Croatia) Veldin Hodža	(Croatia) Hrvatski Dragovoljac	Transfer	Free	
26 Jan 2022	DM	(Croatia) Marino Kukoč	(Croatia) Hrvatski Dragovoljac	Loan (until 15/6/2022)	—N/a	
27 Jan 2022	RB	(Croatia) Ivan Tomečak	(Cyprus) Pafos FC	Transfer	Free	
28 Jan 2022	CB	(Croatia) Nino Galović	(Portugal) Arouca	Transfer	Free	
31 Jan 2022	CB	(Portugal) João Escoval	(Cyprus) Anorthosis Famagusta	Transfer	Free	
13 Feb 2022	DM	(Spain) Iker Pozo	(England) Manchester City	End of loan	—N/a	
15 Feb 2022	RB	(Croatia) Filip Braut	(Croatia) Hrvatski Dragovoljac	Transfer	Free	
15 Feb 2022	CB	(Niger) Djibrilla Ibrahim	(Croatia) Orijent 1919	Loan (until 15/6/2022)	—N/a	
28 Feb 2022	GK	(Croatia) Antonio Frigan	(Croatia) Novigrad	Loan (until 30/6/2022)	—N/a	

Source: Glasilo Hrvatskog nogometnog saveza

Spending: ▼€690,000
Income: ▲€2,800,000
Expenditure: ▲€2,110,000
