= 2022 Croatian Football Cup final =

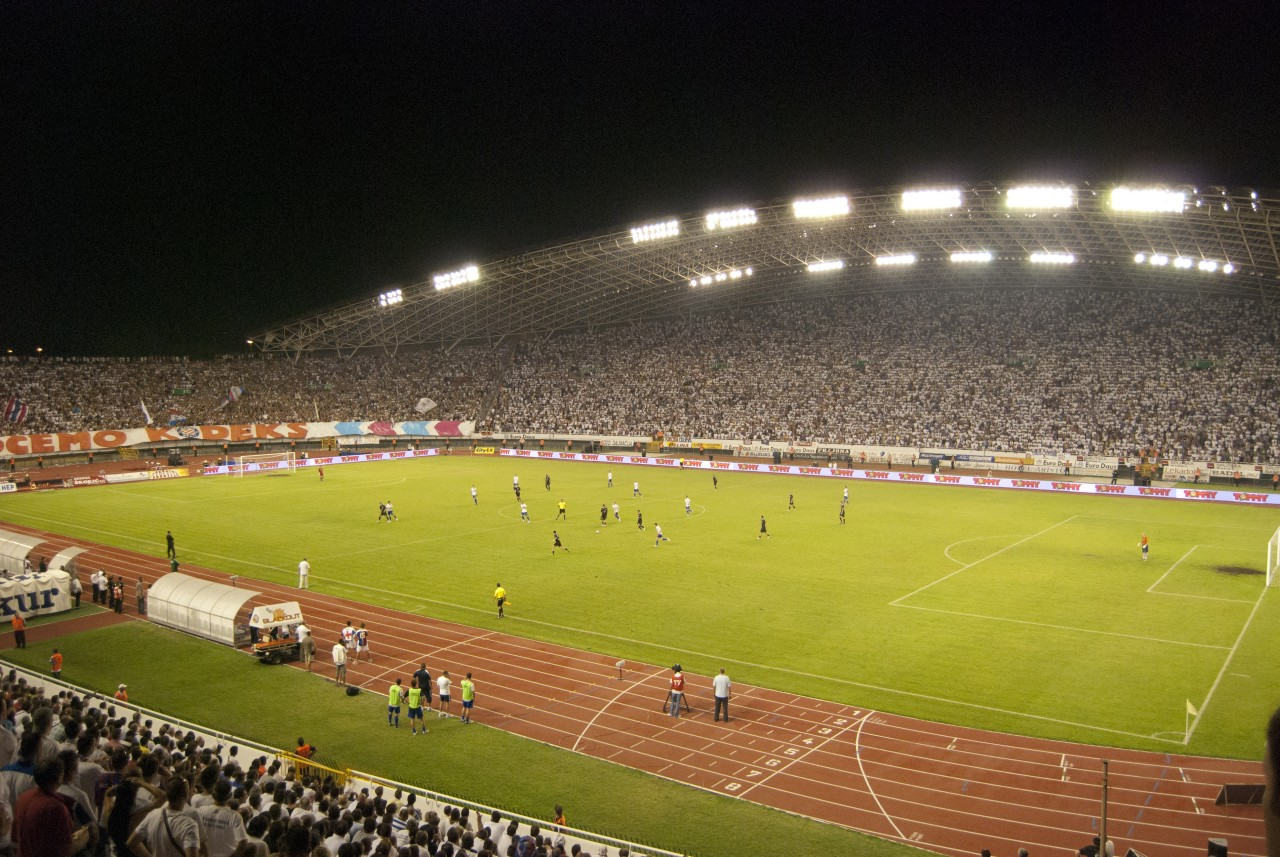
- Stadion Poljud in Split hosted the final
- Event: 2021–22 Croatian Cup
Rijeka	Hajduk Split
Prva HNL	Prva HNL
1	3
- Date: 26 May 2022
- Venue: Stadion Poljud, Split
- Referee: Fran Jović (Zagreb)
- Attendance: 29,411

The 2022 Croatian Cup final between the Adriatic rivals Rijeka and Hajduk Split was played on 26 May 2022 in Split, Croatia.

== Road to the final ==
Rijeka		Round	Hajduk Split	
Opponent	Result		Opponent	Result
Bye		Preliminary round	Bye	
NK Pitomača	7–1	First round	Primorac Biograd na Moru	2–1
Oriolik	6–0	Second round	Belišće	5−1
Dinamo Zagreb	3–1	Quarter-finals	Lokomotiva	6–3
Osijek	3–2 (a.e.t.)	Semi-finals	Gorica	2–1

== Match details ==
26 May 2022
19:00 CEST

Rijeka	1–3	Hajduk Split
Drmić 13'	Report	Ferro 24'; Melnjak 36', 56'

Stadion Poljud, Split
Attendance: 29,411
Referee: Fran Jović (Zagreb)

Rijeka	Hajduk Split

GK	1	(Croatia) Nediljko Labrović
RB	11	(Ghana) Prince Ampem		(substituted off) 75'
CB	18	(Switzerland) Josip Drmić
CB	26	(Slovenia) Adam Gnezda Čerin		(substituted off) 85'
LB	15	(Croatia) Anton Krešić
CM	9	(Colombia) Jorge Obregón		(substituted off) 46'
CM	10	(Croatia) Domagoj Pavičić		(substituted off) 63'
RW	30	(Albania) Lindon Selahi	(yellow card) 35'	(substituted off) 63'
AM	36	(Croatia) Hrvoje Smolčić (c)	(yellow card) 26' (yellow-red card) 41'
LW	14	(North Macedonia) Darko Velkovski
CF	12	(Montenegro) Andrija Vukčević
Substitutes:
GK	98	(Bosnia and Herzegovina) Martin Zlomislić
DF	6	(Serbia) Sava-Arangel Čestić
DF	20	(Colombia) Andrés Solano		(substituted on) 46'
MF	7	(Croatia) Robert Murić		(substituted on) 63'
MF	13	(Croatia) Ivan Lepinjica		(substituted on) 63'
MF	23	(Croatia) Denis Bušnja		(substituted on) 75'
MF	24	(Bosnia and Herzegovina) Mato Stanić		(substituted on) 85'
MF	17	(Croatia) Matej Vuk
FW	33	(Ghana) Issah Abass
Manager:
(Croatia) Goran Tomić

GK	91	(Croatia) Lovre Kalinić (c)
RB	19	(Croatia) Josip Elez
CB	97	(Portugal) Ferro
CB	6	(Italy) Marco Fossati	(yellow card) 27'
LB	14	(Austria) Lukas Grgić	(yellow card) 45'	(substituted off) 62'
CM	23	(Croatia) Filip Krovinović
CM	10	(Croatia) Marko Livaja
RW	17	(Croatia) Dario Melnjak		(substituted off) 90+1'
AM	24	(Croatia) Dino Mikanović
LW	29	(Slovenia) Jan Mlakar		(substituted off) 62'
CF	77	(Kosovo) Emir Sahiti		(substituted off) 81'
Substitutes:
GK	1	(Croatia) Danijel Subašić
GK	70	(Croatia) Josip Posavec
DF	2	(Croatia) Nikola Katić
DF	3	(Croatia) David Čolina		(substituted on) 62'
DF	8	(Czech Republic) Stefan Simić		(substituted on) 90+1'
MF	20	(North Macedonia) Jani Atanasov
MF	4	(Croatia) Josip Vuković		(substituted on) 62'
FW	27	(Croatia) Stipe Biuk		(substituted on) 81'
FW	90	(Croatia) Marin Ljubičić
Manager:
(Lithuania) Valdas Dambrauskas

Assistant referees:
Bojan Zobenica (Velika Gorica)
Kruno Šarić (Županja)
Fourth official:
Igor Pajač (Sveti Ivan Zelina)
Video assistant referee:
Ante Čuljak (Zagreb)
Assistant video assistant referee:
Igor Krmar (Zagreb)

Match rules

- 90 minutes.
- 30 minutes of extra-time if necessary.
- Penalty shoot-out if scores still level.
- Nine named substitutes.
- Maximum of five substitutions.
