= 2021–22 Croatian Football Cup =

SuperSport Hrvatski nogometni kup

Tournament details
- Country: Croatia
- Teams: 48

Final positions
- Champions: Hajduk Split
- Runners-up: Rijeka

Tournament statistics
- Matches played: 47
- Goals scored: 164 (3.49 per match)
- Top goal scorer: Dion Drena Beljo (5)

The 2021–22 Croatian Football Cup was the 31st season of Croatia's football knockout competition. It was sponsored by the betting company SuperSport and known as the SuperSport Hrvatski nogometni kup for sponsorship purposes. The defending champions were Dinamo Zagreb, having won their 16th title the previous year by defeating Istra 1961 in the final.

== Calendar ==
Round	Date(s)	Number of fixtures	Clubs	New entries this round	Goals / games
Preliminary round	25 August 2021	16	48 → 32	32	43 / 16
First round	22 September 2021	16	32 → 16	16	59 / 16
Second round	27 October 2021	8	16 → 8	none	33 / 8
Quarter-finals	1 December 2021	4	8 → 4	none	17 / 4
Semi-finals	2 March 2022	2	4 → 2	none	8 / 2
Final	26 May 2022	1	2 → 1	none	4 / 1

== Participating clubs ==
The following 48 teams qualified for the competition:

Best clubs by cup coefficient 16 clubs	Winners and runners up of county cups 32 clubs
Rijeka; Dinamo Zagreb; Lokomotiva; Osijek; Hajduk Split; Istra 1961; Slaven Belupo; Inter Zaprešić; Gorica; Šibenik; RNK Split; Vinogradar; Rudeš; Varaždin; Cibalia; NK Zagreb	Osijek-Baranja County cup winner: Belišće or BSK Bijelo Brdo; Osijek-Baranja County cup runner up: Belišće or BSK Bijelo Brdo; Zagreb County cup winner: Samobor; Zagreb County cup runner up: Kurilovec; Brod-Posavina County cup winner: Oriolik; Brod-Posavina County cup runner up: Marsonia; Vukovar-Srijem County cup winner: Graničar Županja; Vukovar-Srijem County cup runner up: Vuteks Sloga; Međimurje County cup winner: Međimurje; Međimurje County cup runner up: Mladost Prelog; Koprivnica-Križevci County cup winner: Borac Imbriovec; Koprivnica-Križevci County cup runner up: Radnik Križevci; Istria County cup winner: Uljanik; Istria County cup runner up: Rudar Labin; Sisak-Moslavina County cup winner: Mladost Petrinja; Sisak-Moslavina County cup runner up: Moslavina; Virovitica-Podravina County cup winner: Pitomača; Virovitica-Podravina County cup runner up: Virovitica; Varaždin County cup winner: Bednja; Varaždin County cup runner up: Podravina Ludbreg; Bjelovar-Bilogora County cup winner: Mladost Ždralovi; Bjelovar-Bilogora County cup runner up: Bjelovar; Split-Dalmatia County cup winner: Dugopolje; City of Zagreb cup winner: Sesvete; Primorje-Gorski Kotar County cup winner: Orijent 1919; Požega-Slavonia County cup winner: Slavonija Požega; Zadar County cup winner: Primorac Biograd na Moru; Karlovac County cup winner: Karlovac 1919; Dubrovnik-Neretva County cup winner: Neretvanac Opuzen; Krapina-Zagorje County cup winner: Straža; Šibenik-Knin County cup winner: Zagora Unešić; Lika-Senj County cup winner: Nehaj

== Preliminary round ==
The draw for the preliminary single-legged round was held on 3 August 2021 and the matches were scheduled on 25 August 2021.

Tie no	Home team	Score	Away team
1	Orijent 1919	2–1	Marsonia
2^{*}	Zagora Unešić	1–2	Karlovac 1919
3	Podravina Ludbreg	0–0 (3–5 p)	Bjelovar
4^{*}	Nehaj	2–0	Borac Imbriovec
5	Primorac Biograd na Moru	1–0	Samobor
6	Belišće	4–1	Mladost Prelog
7	Mladost Ždralovi	4–2	Neretvanac Opuzen
8	Bednja	1–0	Uljanik
9	Sesvete	0–0 (3–1 p)	Mladost Petrinja
10	Moslavina	0–2	Oriolik
11^{**}	Međimurje	4–0	Slavonija Požega
12	Pitomača	2–0	Kurilovec
13	Virovitica	0–4	BSK Bijelo Brdo
14	Radnik Križevci	2–3	Dugopolje
15	Graničar Županja	0–1	Rudar Labin
16	Vuteks Sloga	3–1	Straža

* Matches played on 21 August.
** Match played on 24 August.

== First round ==
The draw for the preliminary single-legged round was held on 26 August 2021 and the matches were scheduled on 22 September 2021.

Tie no	Home team	Score	Away team
1^{***}	Pitomača	0–7	Rijeka
2	Orijent 1919	1–4	Dinamo Zagreb
3^{***}	Dugopolje	1–1 (7–8 p)	Lokomotiva
4^{**}	Bednja	0–3	Osijek
5^{***}	Primorac Biograd na Moru	1–2	Hajduk Split
6^{***}	Vuteks Sloga	0–3	Istra 1961
7	Karlovac 1919	0–2	Slaven Belupo
8^{***}	Mladost Ždralovi	3–1	Inter Zaprešić
9^{*}	Nehaj	3–7	Gorica
10	Međimurje	0–1	Šibenik
11	Rudar Labin	2–0	RNK Split
12	Belišće	4–0	Vinogradar
13	Bjelovar	1–5	Rudeš
14	Sesvete	2–3 (a.e.t.)	Varaždin
15	BSK Bijelo Brdo	1–0	Cibalia
16	NK Zagreb	0–1	Oriolik

* Match played on 14 September.
** Match played on 15 September.
*** Matches played on 21 September.

== Second round ==
The second round was scheduled for 27 October 2021. The teams were drawn by tie number where winner of tie No. 1 plays against winner of tie No. 16 and so on, with bigger numbers hosting a tie.

Tie no	Home team	Score	Away team
1^{**}	Oriolik	0–6	Rijeka
2	BSK Bijelo Brdo	2–3	Dinamo Zagreb
3	Varaždin	2–3	Lokomotiva
4^{*}	Rudeš	0–2	Osijek
5^{*}	Belišće	1–5	Hajduk Split
6	Rudar Labin	2–3	Istra 1961
7^{*}	Šibenik	1–1 (4–5 p)	Slaven Belupo
8	Gorica	2–0	Mladost Ždralovi

* Matches played on 26 October.
** Match played on 13 November.

== Quarter-finals ==
The quarter-finals were scheduled for 1 December 2021.

Tie no	Home team	Score	Away team
1	Osijek	0–0 (5–4 p)	Slaven Belupo
2^{*}	Lokomotiva	3–6	Hajduk Split
3	Dinamo Zagreb	1–3	Rijeka
4^{*}	Gorica	2–2 (4–2 p)	Istra 1961

* Matches played on 30 November.

== Semi-finals ==
The semi-finals were scheduled for 2 and 9 March 2022.

2 March 2022
17:30

Hajduk Split	2–1	Gorica
Melnjak 39', 64'	Report	Kalik 90+4' (pen.)

Stadion Poljud, Split
Attendance: 13,063
Referee: Zdenko Lovrić (Đakovo)

9 March 2022
18:00

Rijeka	3–2 (a.e.t.)	Osijek
Krešić 20'; Drmić 76'; Merkulov 118'	Report	Caktaš 42'; Mance 90+2'

Stadion Rujevica, Rijeka
Attendance: 7,225
Referee: Duje Strukan (Split)

== Final ==
The final was played on 26 May 2022.

26 May 2022
19:00 CEST

Rijeka	1–3	Hajduk Split
Drmić 13'	Report	Ferro 24'; Melnjak 36', 56'

Stadion Poljud, Split
Attendance: 29,411
Referee: Fran Jović (Zagreb)

== Top scorers ==
Rank	Player	Club	Goals
1	(Croatia) Dion Drena Beljo	Istra 1961	5
2	(Croatia) Denis Bušnja	Rijeka	4
2	(Croatia) Marko Livaja	Hajduk Split	4
2	(Croatia) Marin Ljubičić	Hajduk Split	4
2	(Croatia) Toni Vinogradac	Belišće	4
6	(Ghana) Abass Issah	Rijeka	3
6	(Croatia) Kristijan Lovrić	Gorica	3
6	(Colombia) Jorge Obregón	Rijeka	3
6	(Croatia) Lucijan Tomac	Nehaj	3

Source: Statistika hrvatskog nogometa
