= Josip Drmić =

Swiss footballer (born 1992)

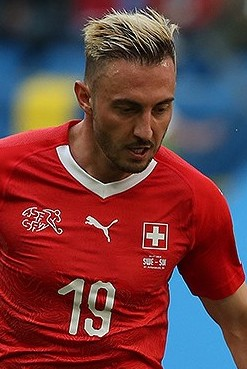
- Drmić with Switzerland at the 2018 FIFA World Cup

Personal information
- Full name: Josip Drmić
- Date of birth: 8 August 1992 (age 34)
- Place of birth: Lachen, Switzerland
- Height: 1.84 m (6 ft 0 in)
- Position: Striker

Youth career
- FC Freienbach
- –2001: FC Rapperswil-Jona
- 2001–2009: Zürich

Senior career*
Years	Team	Apps	(Gls)
2009–2011	Zürich II	26	(26)
2010–2013	Zürich	62	(18)
2013–2014	1. FC Nürnberg	33	(17)
2014–2015	Bayer Leverkusen	25	(6)
2015–2019	Borussia Mönchengladbach	43	(7)
2016	→ Hamburger SV (loan)	6	(1)
2017	→ Borussia Mönchengladbach II	1	(0)
2019–2022	Norwich City	21	(1)
2021–2022	→ Rijeka (loan)	46	(27)
2022–2024	Dinamo Zagreb	43	(9)
Total		306	(112)

International career
2010	Switzerland U18	1	(0)
2010–2011	Switzerland U19	7	(6)
2011–2013	Switzerland U21	11	(6)
2012	Switzerland Olympic	3	(0)
2012–2019	Switzerland	35	(10)
- * Club domestic league appearances and goals

Josip Drmić (pronounced [jǒsip dř̩mitɕ]; born 8 August 1992) is a Swiss former professional footballer who played as a striker.

Drmić began his career with Zürich and moved to 1. FC Nürnberg in 2013, where he scored 17 goals in his first Bundesliga season. He then moved to Bayer Leverkusen for one season and was signed by Borussia Mönchengladbach, who loaned him to Hamburger SV in 2016. After playing in the Premier League for Norwich City he moved to the Croatian Football League in 2021, playing for Rijeka and Dinamo Zagreb, before departing the latter side in 2024.

A full international from 2012 to 2019, Drmić earned 35 caps for Switzerland, and scored 10 goals. He represented them at the 2012 Olympics and the 2014 and 2018 FIFA World Cups.

== Early life ==
Drmić was born in Lachen, Canton of Schwyz, to ethnic Bosnian Croat parents from Vitez, and is a dual national of Switzerland and Croatia.

He applied for Swiss nationality at the age of 16, taking the exam three times in front of commissioners in his home village of Freienbach. On the second attempt, he was rejected because he knew more about Zürich, where he had spent six years in a football school, than the village. He then hired a lawyer who made the case that this was acceptable as Zürich is nearby and of importance to the community.

== Club career ==
=== Zürich ===
Drmić began his playing career at Zürich and rose through the youth ranks, soon playing regularly for Zürich's reserve team. He eventually made his league debut on 6 February 2010 against Neuchâtel Xamax, coming on as a substitute. He scored his first Swiss Super League goal in a 1–1 away draw against Luzern on 4 February 2012.

During the 2012–13 season, Drmić scored 13 goals in 31 Super League matches and 19 goals from 39 matches in all competitions.

=== 1. FC Nürnberg ===
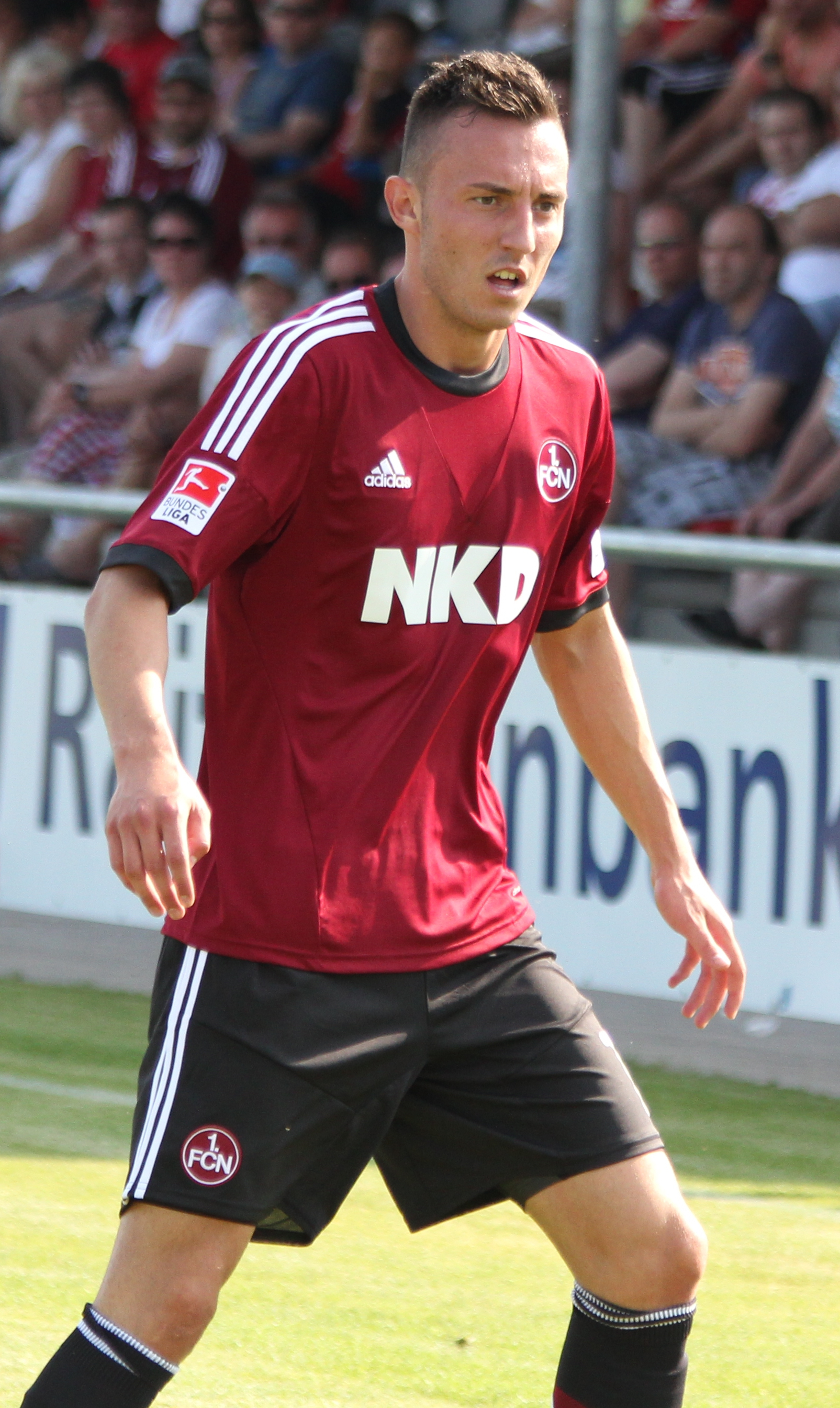
Drmić in action for Nürnberg in July 2013

In July 2013, Drmić joined Bundesliga club 1. FC Nürnberg on a four-year contract. On 18 August, he scored his first Bundesliga goal in a 2–2 draw against Hertha BSC. He finished his first season with 17 league goals, the third most by any player in the league, behind Borussia Dortmund's Robert Lewandowski and Bayern Munich's Mario Mandžukić. However, his team was relegated to the 2. Bundesliga.

=== Bayer Leverkusen ===
On 12 May 2014, Drmić agreed to sign a five-year deal with Bayer Leverkusen, for an undisclosed fee. He made his debut on 19 August as an 88th-minute substitute for Hakan Çalhanoğlu as the side won 3–2 away against Copenhagen in the first leg of their UEFA Champions League play-off.

Drmić made his league debut on 12 September by replacing Stefan Kießling in added time of a 3–3 draw at home against Werder Bremen. Nine days later, he scored his first goal for the team, starting and then equalising in the 29th minute of a 4–1 defeat at VfL Wolfsburg. He added his first brace for the club on 29 November, as a half-time replacement for Stefan Kießling in a 5–1 win over 1. FC Köln. On 13 March 2015, he added another brace for his fifth and sixth goals of the league season, in a 4–0 home win over VfB Stuttgart. Drmić was the only Leverkusen player to miss in the penalty shootout against Bayern Munich on 8 April; his attempt was saved by Manuel Neuer, which eliminated the team from the quarter-finals of the DFB-Pokal.

=== Borussia Mönchengladbach ===
On 17 June 2015, Drmić joined his third Bundesliga club, Borussia Mönchengladbach, on a four-year deal. He made his debut on 10 August, starting in a 4–1 win at FC St. Pauli in the first round of the DFB-Pokal. Five days later, he made his league bow in a 4–0 loss at Borussia Dortmund. Drmić totalled only one goal from 19 matches across all competitions before leaving on loan. His only goal came on 28 November, a header as Mönchengladbach came from behind to draw 3–3 at 1899 Hoffenheim.

On 1 February 2016, Drmić joined fellow league team Hamburger SV on loan until the end of the season. He debuted six days later, starting in a 1–1 draw with 1. FC Köln at the Volksparkstadion. On 27 February, he scored the only goal of his loan, opening a home match of the same score against FC Ingolstadt.

Following an absence through a knee injury, Drmić made his comeback on 28 October 2017, playing the first 52 minutes of Borussia Mönchengladbach II's 3–0 home loss to SC Verl in the Regionalliga.

Due to back injury and a muscle tear, Drmić played only five times in the 2018–19 Bundesliga, scoring twice.

=== Norwich City ===
On 25 June 2019, Drmić joined Norwich City on a free transfer, signing a three-year deal. He was persuaded to join them by their Swiss defender Timm Klose. He made his Premier League debut on 8 August, coming on as an 83rd-minute substitute for Teemu Pukki in a 4–1 loss at European champions Liverpool. On 5 October, again as a late replacement for the Finn, he scored his first goal as consolation in a 5–1 home loss to Aston Villa.

Drmić scored the equaliser on 4 March 2020 as Norwich drew 1–1 away to Tottenham Hotspur in the fifth round of the FA Cup, then won on penalties to reach the last eight of the tournament for the first time since 1992.

==== Rijeka (loan) ====
On 5 February 2021, Drmić joined Rijeka on loan until the end of the 2020–21 season. He scored his first goal on 17 March in a 3–1 victory over Slaven Belupo.

On 6 July 2021, the loan was extended for the 2021–22 season. He scored in each of his three appearances in the season's national cup, opening a 3–1 loss to Adriatic rivals Hajduk Split in the final; in the league he was second top scorer with 21 goals including a hat-trick in a 5–3 win at Šibenik on 30 April.

=== Dinamo Zagreb ===
Drmić signed for Dinamo Zagreb on 7 June 2022, receiving the squad number 18. He made his debut on 9 July in a penalty shootout victory over Split in the Super Cup, being substituted for Mislav Oršić after 66 minutes. Six days later in his first league game, he scored twice in a 3–2 home win over city rivals Lokomotiva Zagreb.

== International career ==
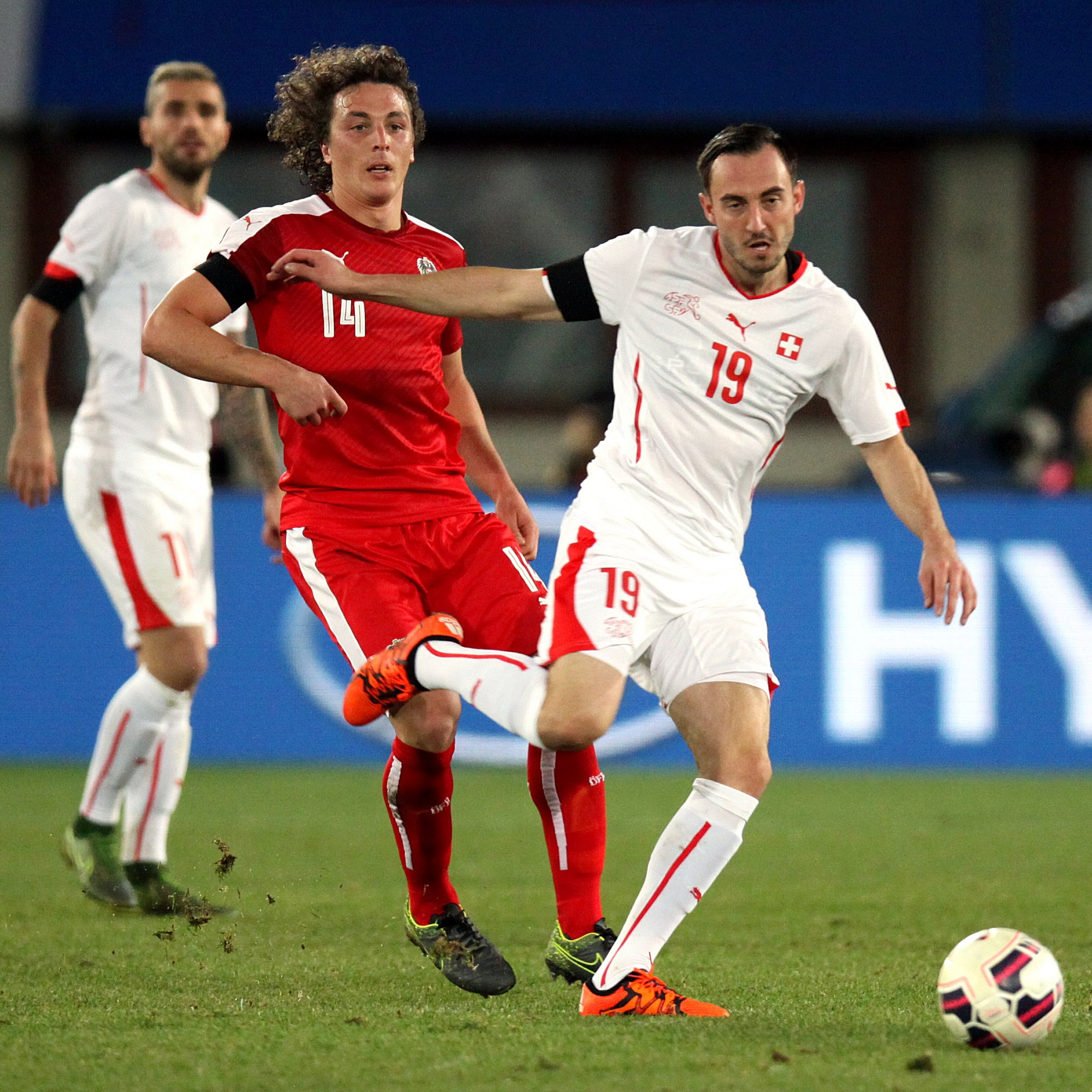
Drmić holding off Austria's Julian Baumgartlinger in a November 2015 friendly

Eligible for Switzerland, Croatia and Bosnia and Herzegovina, Drmić represents his country of birth internationally, having played at under-19, under-21 and senior level. He stated that he opted for Switzerland after nobody from the Croatian Football Federation reached out to him. He was a member of Switzerland's squad at the 2012 Summer Olympics, and came on as a substitute in the last two matches as the team were eliminated in last place in Group B.

On 11 September 2012, Drmić won his first cap for the Switzerland senior team in a 2–0 2014 FIFA World Cup qualifying win over Albania. He scored his first two international goals in a 2–2 draw with Croatia on 6 March 2014.

On 13 May 2014, Drmić was named in Switzerland's squad for the 2014 World Cup. He scored the only goal of the match in the 83rd minute from Blerim Džemaili's assist as Switzerland beat Jamaica in a warm-up match for the tournament on 30 May. In the first match of the tournament, a 2–1 win over Ecuador, he had a goal ruled out for offside and was substituted for Haris Seferovic, who scored the winning goal. Drmić was dropped for Seferovic for the second match, a 5–2 defeat to France, but returned and set up two of Xherdan Shaqiri's three goals in the 3–0 win over Honduras in the last group match in Manaus, which saw Switzerland advance to the knockout stage as group runners-up.

Drmić scored his first competitive goal for Switzerland on 14 June 2015, equalising in a 2–1 away victory over Lithuania in UEFA Euro 2016 qualifying. On 5 September, he came on in the 64th minute for Blerim Džemaili, and scored twice as the Swiss came from 0–2 down to defeat Slovenia 3–2 in a qualifier in Basel. After having knee surgery in March, he missed the final tournament.

In qualification for the 2018 World Cup, Drmić scored once, the sole goal of a victory over Latvia at the Stade de Genève on 25 March 2017. It was his first goal in any match since February 2016, heading an Admir Mehmedi cross two minutes after coming on in place of Gelson Fernandes. Manager Vladimir Petković named him for the squad to compete in the finals in Russia. In the final group game against Costa Rica in Nizhny Novgorod, he came on as a late substitute for Mario Gavranović and scored in a 2–2 draw that ensured passage to the last 16.

At the 2018–19 Nations League in Portugal, Drmić was the only player to miss in the third-place penalty shootout against England, with Jordan Pickford saving from him in sudden death.

== Career statistics ==
=== Club ===
Appearances and goals by club, season and competition
Club	Season	League			National cup (Note: Includes Swiss Cup, DFB-Pokal, FA Cup, Croatian Cup)		Europe		Other		Total	
Club	Season	Division	Apps	Goals	Apps	Goals	Apps	Goals	Apps	Goals	Apps	Goals
Zürich	2009–10	Swiss Super League	4	0	0	0	0	0	—		4	0
Zürich	2010–11	Swiss Super League	7	0	0	0	0	0	—		7	0
Zürich	2011–12	Swiss Super League	20	5	1	0	5	0	—		26	5
Zürich	2012–13	Swiss Super League	31	13	2	0	0	0	—		33	13
Zürich	Total		62	18	3	0	5	0	—		70	18
1. FC Nürnberg	2013–14	Bundesliga	33	17	1	0	—		—		34	17
Bayer Leverkusen	2014–15	Bundesliga	25	6	4	0	9 (Note: Appearances in UEFA Champions League)	0	—		38	6
Borussia Mönchengladbach	2015–16	Bundesliga	13	1	3	0	3	0	—		16	1
Borussia Mönchengladbach	2016–17	Bundesliga	12	0	1	0	0	0	—		13	0
Borussia Mönchengladbach	2017–18	Bundesliga	13	4	1	0	—		—		14	4
Borussia Mönchengladbach	2018–19	Bundesliga	5	2	0	0	—		—		5	2
Borussia Mönchengladbach	Total		43	7	5	0	3	0	—		51	7
Hamburger SV (loan)	2015–16	Bundesliga	6	1	0	0	—		—		6	1
Borussia Mönchengladbach II	2017–18	Regionalliga West	1	0	—		—		—		1	0
Norwich City	2019–20	Premier League	21	1	3	2	—		—		24	3
Norwich City	2020–21	Championship	0	0	0	0	—		—		0	0
Norwich City	Total		21	1	3	2	—		—		24	3
Rijeka (loan)	2020–21	Prva HNL	16	6	2	1	—		—		18	7
Rijeka (loan)	2021–22	Prva HNL	30	21	3	3	4 (Note: Appearances in UEFA Europa Conference League)	1	—		37	25
Rijeka (loan)	Total		46	27	5	4	4	1	—		55	32
Dinamo Zagreb	2022–23	Croatian Football League	35	6	4	6	11	2	1 (Note: Appearances in Croatian Super Cup)	0	51	14
Dinamo Zagreb	2023–24	Croatian Football League	8	3	1	3	3	0	0	0	12	6
Dinamo Zagreb	Total		43	9	5	9	14	2	1	0	63	20
Career total			280	86	25	14	35	3	1	0	341	103

=== International ===
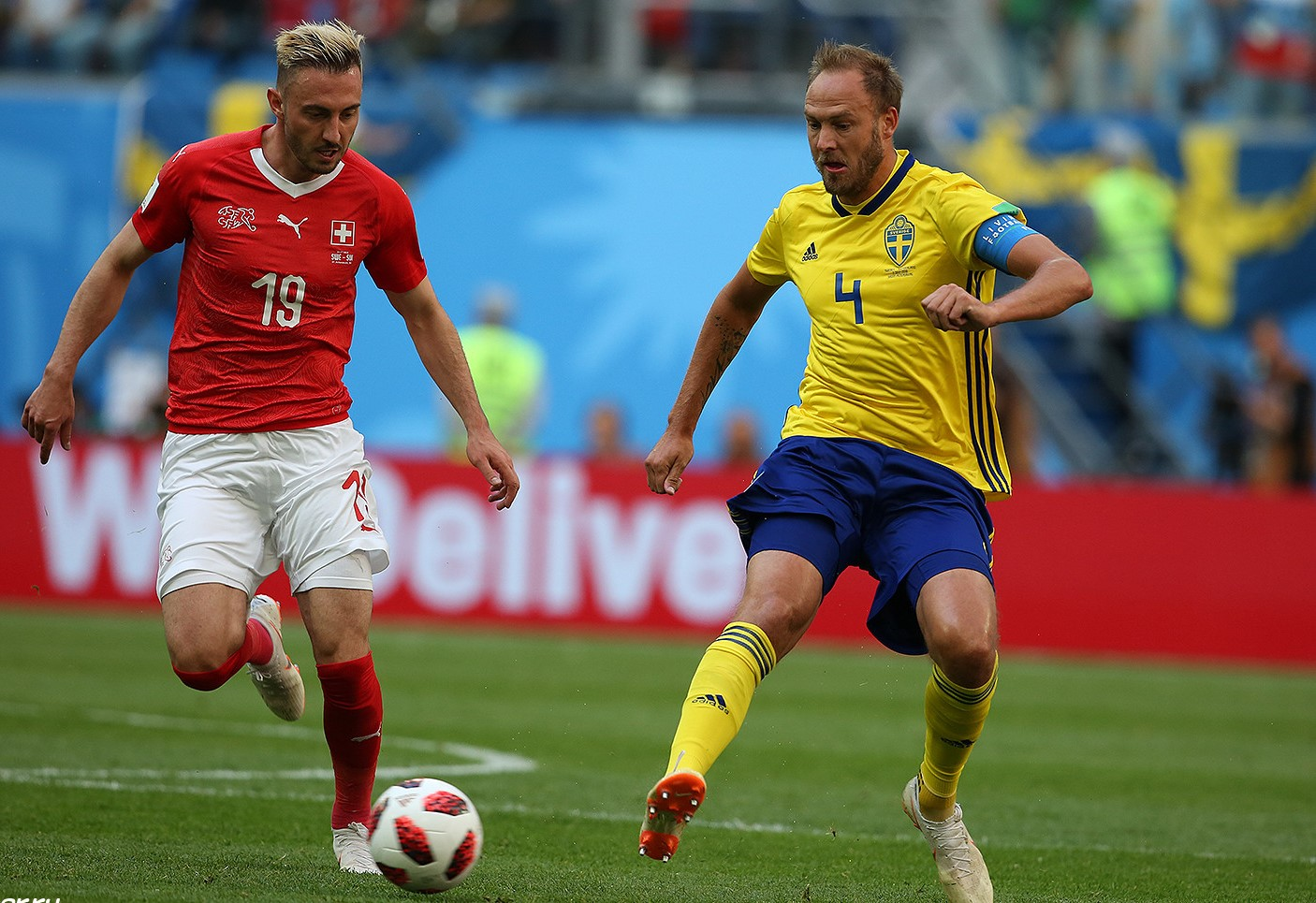
Drmić and Sweden's Andreas Granqvist at the 2018 FIFA World Cup

Switzerland
Year	Apps	Goals
2012	1	0
2013	3	0
2014	12	4
2015	9	4
2016	0	0
2017	1	1
2018	6	1
2019	3	0
Total	35	10

Scores and results list Switzerland's goal tally first.

No.	Date	Venue	Opponent	Score	Result	Competition
1.	5 March 2014	AFG Arena, St. Gallen, Switzerland	Croatia	1–0	2–2	Friendly
2.	5 March 2014	AFG Arena, St. Gallen, Switzerland	Croatia	2–1	2–2	Friendly
3.	30 May 2014	Swissporarena, Lucerne, Switzerland	Jamaica	1–0	1–0	Friendly
4.	18 November 2014	Stadion Miejski, Wrocław, Poland	Poland	1–0	2–2	Friendly
5.	14 June 2015	LFF Stadium, Vilnius, Lithuania	Lithuania	1–1	2–1	UEFA Euro 2016 qualifying
6.	5 September 2015	St. Jakob-Park, Basel, Switzerland	Slovenia	1–2	3–2	UEFA Euro 2016 qualifying
7.	5 September 2015	St. Jakob-Park, Basel, Switzerland	Slovenia	3–2	3–2	UEFA Euro 2016 qualifying
8.	13 November 2015	Štadión Antona Malatinského, Trnava, Slovakia	Slovakia	2–3	2–3	Friendly
9.	25 March 2017	Stade de Genève, Geneva, Switzerland	Latvia	1–0	1–0	2018 FIFA World Cup qualification
10.	27 June 2018	Nizhny Novgorod Stadium, Nizhny Novgorod, Russia	Costa Rica	2–1	2–2	2018 FIFA World Cup

== Honours ==
Rijeka

- Croatian Cup runner-up: 2021–22

Dinamo Zagreb

- Croatian Football League: 2022–23
- Croatian Super Cup: 2022, 2023
