= Anton Krešić =

Association football player

Personal information
- Date of birth: 29 January 1996 (age 30)
- Place of birth: Dieburg, Germany
- Height: 1.98 m (6 ft 6 in)
- Position: Defender

Team information
- Current team: CFR Cluj
- Number: 41

Youth career
- 2003–2010: Naftaš Ivanić-Grad
- 2010–2015: NK Zagreb
- 2015–2016: Atalanta

Senior career*
Years	Team	Apps	(Gls)
2016–2022	Atalanta	0	(0)
2016–2017	→ Trapani (loan)	11	(0)
2017–2018	→ Avellino (loan)	25	(3)
2018–2019	→ Cremonese (loan)	9	(0)
2019	→ Carpi (loan)	12	(0)
2019–2021	→ Padova (loan)	43	(5)
2021–2022	→ Rijeka (loan)	28	(3)
2022–2024	Rijeka	14	(0)
2023–2024	→ CFR Cluj (loan)	28	(0)
2024–	CFR Cluj	11	(1)
2025	→ Gorica (loan)	4	(0)
2026	→ Tirana (loan)	15	(1)

International career
2010	Croatia U15	2	(0)
2012–2013	Croatia U16	8	(0)
2012–2013	Croatia U17	9	(1)
2014	Croatia U19	3	(0)
- * Club domestic league appearances and goals as of 18 October 2026

Anton Krešić (Croatian pronunciation: [ǎntoːn krêʃitɕ]; born 29 January 1996) is a Croatian professional footballer who plays as a defender for Liga I club CFR Cluj.

== Club career ==
=== Atalanta ===
==== Loan to Trapani ====
On 11 July 2016, Krešić was loaned to Serie B club Trapani on a season-long loan deal. On 1 October he made his professional debut in the Serie B for Trapani as a substitute replacing Caio de Cenco in the 85th minute of a 2–0 home defeat against Cittadella. On 24 December he played his first entire match for Trapani, a 3–1 away defeat against Cesena. Krešić ended his season-long loan to Trapani with 11 appearances, including 10 as a starter.

==== Loan to Avellino ====
On 15 July 2017, Krešić was signed by Serie B side Avellino on a season-long loan deal. On 15 September he made his Serie B debut for Avellino as a substitute replacing Leonardo Morosini in the 64th minute of a 3–1 away defeat against Cesena. On 18 September he played his first entire match for Avellino, a 1–1 home draw against Venezia. On 30 September, Krešić scored his first professional goal in the 53rd minute of a 3–2 home win over Empoli. On 8 October he scored his second goal in the 65th minute of a 2–1 away defeat against Bari. On 15 October he scored his third goal in the 48th minute of a 3–2 home defeat against Salernitana. Krešić ended his loan to Avellino with 25 appearances and 3 goals.

==== Loan to Cremonese ====
On 12 July 2018 he was loaned once again in Serie B, this time to Cremonese.

==== Loan to Carpi ====
On 8 January 2019 he joined Serie B club Carpi on loan.

==== Loan to Padova ====
On 11 July 2019, Krešić joined Padova on loan with an option to buy. On 27 August 2020 the loan was renewed for the 2020–21 season.

=== Rijeka ===
On 16 July 2021, he moved to Rijeka on a season-long loan with an option to buy. He returned to Rijeka on a permanent basis on 2 July 2022.

=== CFR Cluj ===
On 17 June 2024, Krešić joined Romanian Liga I club CFR Cluj on a permanent basis following a successful loan spell the previous season.

== International ==
He was on the roster for Croatia at the 2013 UEFA European Under-17 Championship.

== Career statistics ==
As of 28 October 2026

Appearances and goals by club, season and competition
Club	Season	League			National cup (Note: Includes Coppa Italia, Coppa Italia Serie C, Croatian Cup, Cupa României)		Europe		Other		Total	
Club	Season	Division	Apps	Goals	Apps	Goals	Apps	Goals	Apps	Goals	Apps	Goals
Trapani (loan)	2016–17	Serie B	11	0	0	0	—		—		11	0
Avellino (loan)	2017–18	Serie B	25	3	0	0	—		—		25	3
Cremonese (loan)	2018–19	Serie B	9	0	1	0	—		—		10	0
Carpi (loan)	2018–19	Serie B	12	0	—		—		—		12	0
Padova (loan)	2019–20	Serie C	25	3	2 (Note: One appearance in Coppa Italia Serie C, one appearance in Coppa Italia)	0	—		3 (Note: Appearances in Serie C promotion play-offs)	0	30	3
Padova (loan)	2020–21	Serie C	18	2	0	0	—		6	1	24	3
Padova (loan)	Total		43	5	2	0	—		9	1	54	6
Rijeka (loan)	2021–22	Prva HNL	28	3	4	1	4 (Note: Appearances in UEFA Conference League)	0	—		36	4
Rijeka	2022–23	Prva HNL	14	0	2	0	2	0	—		18	0
Rijeka	Total		42	3	6	1	6	0	—		54	4
CFR Cluj (loan)	2023–24	Liga I	28	0	3	0	2	0	—		33	0
CFR Cluj	2024–25	Liga I	3	0	0	0	4	1	—		7	1
CFR Cluj	2025–26	Liga I	3	0	0	0	1	0	0	0	4	0
CFR Cluj	2026–27	Liga I	5	1	2	0	0	0	—		7	1
CFR Cluj	Total		39	1	5	0	7	1	0	0	51	2
Gorica (loan)	2024–25	Prva HNL	4	0	1	0	—		—		5	0
Tirana (loan)	2025–26	Kategoria Superiore	15	1	2	0	—		—		17	1
Career total			197	13	17	1	13	1	9	1	236	16

== Honours ==
Rijeka

- Croatian Cup runner-up: 2021–22

CFR Cluj

- Cupa României: 2024–25
- Supercupa României runner-up: 2025
