= Adam Gnezda Čerin =

Slovenian footballer (born 1999)

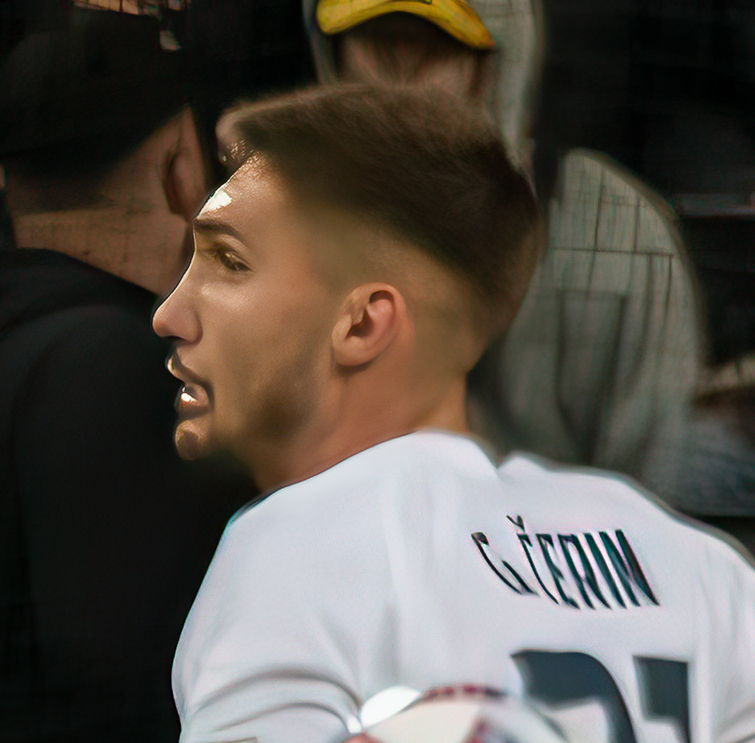
- Gnezda Čerin with Slovenia in 2022

Personal information
- Date of birth: 16 July 1999 (age 27)
- Place of birth: Postojna, Slovenia
- Height: 1.80 m (5 ft 11 in)
- Position: Midfielder

Team information
- Current team: Al Wahda
- Number: 8

Youth career
- Idrija
- –2014: Bravo
- 2014–2018: Domžale

Senior career*
Years	Team	Apps	(Gls)
2017–2019	Domžale	53	(8)
2019–2022	1. FC Nürnberg	5	(0)
2020–2022	→ Rijeka (loan)	58	(3)
2022–2026	Panathinaikos	114	(8)
2026–	Al Wahda	1	(0)

International career^{‡}
2015–2016	Slovenia U17 (Note: Official competitive UEFA matches only)	5	(1)
2017	Slovenia U19	3	(1)
2018–2021	Slovenia U21	12	(0)
2019	Slovenia B	1	(0)
2020–	Slovenia	57	(6)
- * Club domestic league appearances and goals as of 31 August 2026 ‡ National team caps and goals as of 16 November 2026

Adam Gnezda Čerin (born 16 July 1999) is a Slovenian professional footballer who plays as a midfielder for UAE Pro League club Al Wahda and the Slovenia national team.

== Club career ==
On 2 July 2022, Gnezda Čerin left 1. FC Nürnberg and signed a four-year contract with Super League Greece side Panathinaikos for an alleged transfer fee of €700,000.

== International career ==
Gnezda Čerin made his debut for Slovenia on 11 November 2020 in a friendly game against Azerbaijan. He started the game and was substituted at half-time.

== Career statistics ==
=== Club ===
As of 11 August 2026

Appearances and goals by club, season and competition
Club	Season	League			National cup (Note: Includes Slovenian Cup, Croatian Cup, Greek Cup)		Continental		Total	
Club	Season	Division	Apps	Goals	Apps	Goals	Apps	Goals	Apps	Goals
Domžale	2017–18	Slovenian PrvaLiga	11	1	0	0	2 (Note: Appearances in UEFA Europa League)	0	13	1
Domžale	2018–19	Slovenian PrvaLiga	35	7	2	1	4	0	41	8
Domžale	2019–20	Slovenian PrvaLiga	7	0	0	0	4	1	11	1
Domžale	Total		53	8	2	1	10	1	65	10
1. FC Nürnberg	2019–20	2. Bundesliga	5	0	0	0	—		5	0
Rijeka (loan)	2020–21	Prva HNL	28	1	3	0	5	0	36	1
Rijeka (loan)	2021–22	Prva HNL	30	2	3	0	4 (Note: Appearances in UEFA Conference League)	0	37	2
Rijeka (loan)	Total		58	3	6	0	9	0	73	3
Panathinaikos	2022–23	Super League Greece	34	1	4	3	2	0	40	4
Panathinaikos	2023–24	Super League Greece	26	3	4	0	10 (Note: Four appearances in UEFA Champions League, six appearances in UEFA Europa League)	0	40	3
Panathinaikos	2024–25	Super League Greece	27	2	4	1	13 (Note: Three appearances in UEFA Europa League, ten appearances in UEFA Conference League)	0	44	3
Panathinaikos	2025–26	Super League Greece	27	2	3	0	13 (Note: One appearance in UEFA Champions League, twelve appearances in UEFA Europa League)	0	43	2
Panathinaikos	2026–27	Super League Greece	0	0	0	0	4	0	4	0
Panathinaikos	Total		114	8	15	4	42	0	171	12
Career total			230	19	23	5	61	1	314	25

=== International ===
As of match played 16 November 2026

Appearances and goals by national team and year
National team	Year	Apps	Goals
Slovenia	2020	1	0
Slovenia	2021	6	1
Slovenia	2022	10	1
Slovenia	2023	10	1
Slovenia	2024	14	2
Slovenia	2025	6	1
Slovenia	2026	10	0
Total		57	6

Scores and results list Slovenia's goal tally first, score column indicates score after each Gnezda Čerin goal.

List of international goals scored by Adam Gnezda Čerin
No.	Date	Venue	Opponent	Score	Result	Competition
1	14 November 2021	Stožice Stadium, Ljubljana, Slovenia	Cyprus	2–0	2–1	2022 FIFA World Cup qualification
2	12 June 2022	Stožice Stadium, Ljubljana, Slovenia	Serbia	1–2	2–2	2022–23 UEFA Nations League B
3	17 October 2023	Windsor Park, Belfast, Northern Ireland	Northern Ireland	1–0	1–0	UEFA Euro 2024 qualifying
4	26 March 2024	Stožice Stadium, Ljubljana, Slovenia	Portugal	1–0	2–0	Friendly
5	17 November 2024	Ernst-Happel-Stadion, Vienna, Austria	Austria	1–1	1–1	2024–25 UEFA Nations League B
6	23 March 2025	Stožice Stadium, Ljubljana, Slovenia	Slovakia	1–0	1–0	2024–25 UEFA Nations League promotion/relegation play-offs

== Honours ==
Panathinaikos

- Greek Cup: 2023–24
