= Ferro (footballer) =

Portuguese footballer (born 1997)

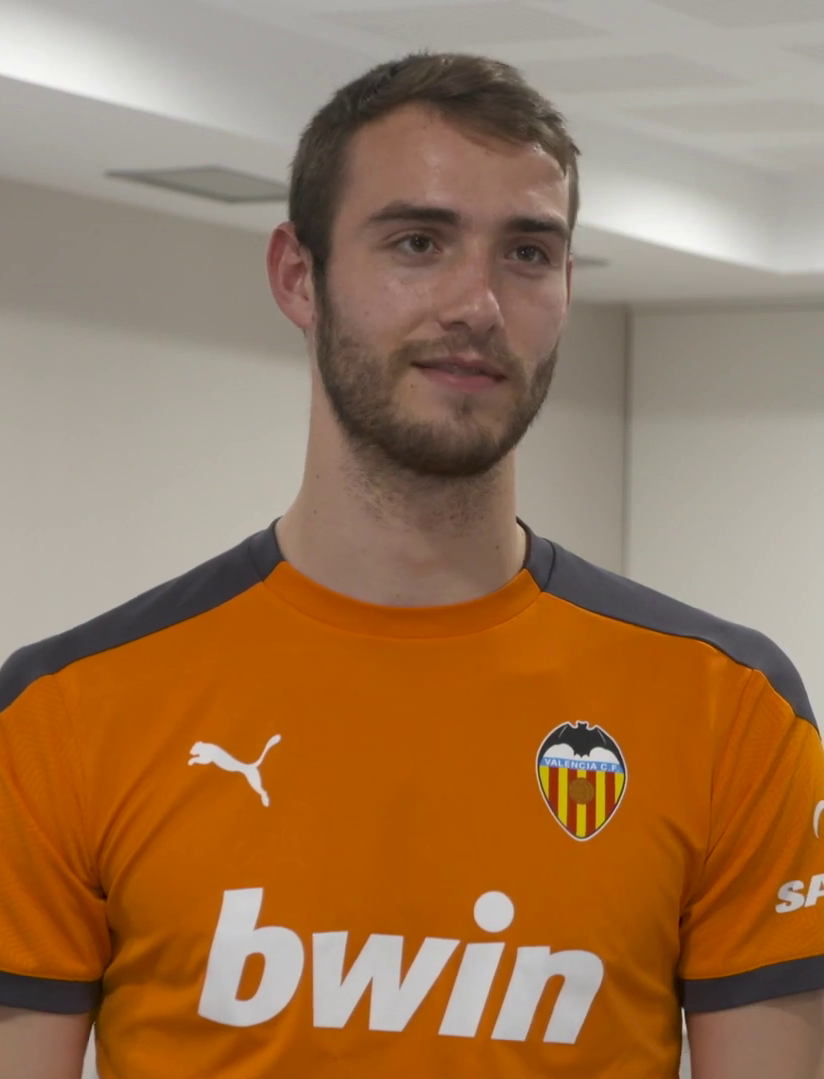
- Ferro with Valencia in 2021

Personal information
- Full name: Francisco Reis Ferreira
- Date of birth: 26 March 1997 (age 29)
- Place of birth: Oliveira de Azeméis, Portugal
- Height: 1.91 m (6 ft 3 in)
- Position: Centre back

Team information
- Current team: Estoril
- Number: 4

Youth career
- 2005–2008: Oliveirense
- 2008–2009: Casa do Benfica de Estarreja
- 2009–2011: AD Taboeira
- 2011–2016: Benfica
- 2014: → Casa Pia (loan)

Senior career*
Years	Team	Apps	(Gls)
2016–2019	Benfica B	91	(5)
2019–2023	Benfica	43	(3)
2021	→ Valencia (loan)	3	(0)
2022	→ Hajduk Split (loan)	13	(1)
2022–2023	→ Vitesse (loan)	9	(0)
2023–2024	Hajduk Split	14	(0)
2024–2025	Estrela da Amadora	18	(0)
2025–	Estoril	27	(2)

International career
2013–2014	Portugal U17	14	(0)
2015	Portugal U18	7	(1)
2015–2016	Portugal U19	13	(1)
2016–2017	Portugal U20	9	(1)
2017–2018	Portugal U21	8	(0)
- * Club domestic league appearances and goals as of 25 May 2026

Francisco Reis Ferreira (born 26 March 1997), commonly known as Ferro, is a Portuguese professional footballer who plays as a centre-back for Primeira Liga club Estoril.

Formed at Benfica, he made over 60 appearances for the club, winning the Primeira Liga in 2018–19. He was loaned to Valencia, Hajduk Split and Vitesse, winning the Croatian Football Cup with the second in 2022.

Ferro earned 51 caps for Portugal at the youth level, and was called up for the senior team in 2019.

== Club career ==
Born in Oliveira de Azeméis, Aveiro District, Ferro started his football career at local club Oliveirense in 2005, where he remained until 2008. He then played for CB Estarreja and AD Taboeira before joining Benfica's youth system in 2011. Following his progress to the club's reserve team, he made his professional debut in a 2–1 away win over Oliveirense in LigaPro on 30 January 2016.

Ferro was promoted to Benfica's first team on 1 February 2019, alongside three other reserve team players, and six days later, he debuted with the Lisbon side as a 38th-minute substitute, replacing Jardel in a 2–1 home win over Sporting CP in the first leg of the Taça de Portugal semi-finals. In his first appearance as a starter, he scored his first goal for Benfica, the sixth in a 10–0 home thrashing of Nacional in Primeira Liga on 10 February.

Four days later, Ferro made his European debut as Benfica beat Galatasaray 2–1 in the first leg of the UEFA Europa League round of 32, their first ever victory in Turkey. He scored his first UEFA goal on 14 March, the second in a 3–0 (a.e.t.) win over Dinamo Zagreb in the round of 16's second leg.

On 17 October 2019, Ferro extended his Benfica contract until 2024.

On 31 January 2021, Spanish club Valencia announced the signing of Ferro on loan for the remainder of the 2020–21 season. He made three La Liga appearances, beginning on 14 February with a 2–0 loss at Real Madrid.

Unused by Benfica in the league, Ferro was loaned to Hajduk Split of the Croatian Football League on 31 January 2022. On his debut for the eventual runners-up five days later, he scored in the third minute of a 4–0 win at Gorica; he equalised in the Dalmatian club's 3–1 win over Rijeka in the cup final on 26 May.

On 14 July 2022, Ferro joined Vitesse in the Netherlands on a season-long loan, with an option to buy.

After just half a year with Vitesse, he rejoined Hajduk Split, but this time on a permanent transfer for a fee of around €500,000.

In the summer of 2024, Ferro returned to Portugal, signing a four-year contract with Primeira Liga club Estrela da Amadora. At the end of the season, in which he made 18 appearances for the Amadora-based side, he terminated his contract and joined fellow Primeira Liga club Estoril, signing a two-year deal.

== International career ==
Ferro earned 51 caps for Portugal at youth level, starting with a 2–0 under-17 win over Bosnia and Herzegovina on 8 October 2013, in qualification for the following May's UEFA European Championship. He was called up for the finals in Malta, where the team were eliminated 2–0 in the semi-finals by eventual champions England. On 3 June 2015, he scored the first of his three international goals at the end of a 2–0 under-18 win over Norway in Mafra.

On 10 November 2015, Ferro scored the only goal as the under-19 team defeated Moldova in Nelas in a qualifier for the European Championship. He played the following July in the finals in Germany, where the side were eliminated by France in the last four. He also went with the under-20 team to the 2017 FIFA World Cup in South Korea.

In early September 2019, Ferro was called up for the first time to the Portugal national team for the UEFA Euro 2020 qualifiers against Serbia and Lithuania, replacing injured Pepe.

== Career statistics ==
=== Club ===
As of match played 23 September 2023

Appearances and goals by club, season and competition
Club	Season	League			National cup (Note: Includes Taça de Portugal, Copa del Rey, Croatian Football Cup, KNVB Cup)		League cup (Note: Includes Taça da Liga)		Europe		Other		Total	
Club	Season	Division	Apps	Goals	Apps	Goals	Apps	Goals	Apps	Goals	Apps	Goals	Apps	Goals
Benfica B	2015–16	LigaPro	9	0	—		—		—		—		9	0
Benfica B	2016–17	LigaPro	30	3	—		—		—		—		30	3
Benfica B	2017–18	LigaPro	33	2	—		—		—		—		33	2
Benfica B	2018–19	LigaPro	19	0	—		—		—		—		19	0
Benfica B	Total		91	5	—		—		—		—		91	5
Benfica	2018–19	Primeira Liga	13	2	1	0	0	0	4 (Note: Appearance(s) in UEFA Europa League)	1	—		18	3
Benfica	2019–20	Primeira Liga	26	1	6	0	0	0	7 (Note: Five appearances in UEFA Champions League, two appearances in UEFA Europa League)	0	1 (Note: Appearance in Supertaça Cândido de Oliveira)	0	40	1
Benfica	2020–21	Primeira Liga	4	0	1	0	1	0	1	0	0	0	7	0
Benfica	2021–22	Primeira Liga	0	0	1	0	1	0	0	0	—		2	0
Benfica	Total		43	3	9	0	2	0	12	1	1	0	67	4
Valencia (loan)	2020–21	La Liga	3	0	—		—		—		—		3	0
Hajduk Split (loan)	2021–22	Croatian Football League	13	1	1	1	—		—		—		14	2
Vitesse (loan)	2022–23	Eredivisie	9	0	1	0	—		—		—		10	0
Hajduk Split	2022–23	Croatian Football League	9	0	2	0	—		—		—		11	0
Hajduk Split	2023–24	Croatian Football League	4	0	0	0	—		1 (Note: Appearance in UEFA Europa Conference League)	0	1 (Note: Appearance in Croatian Football Super Cup)	0	6	0
Hajduk Split	Total		13	0	2	0	—		1	0	1	0	17	0
Career total			172	9	13	1	2	0	13	1	2	0	202	11

== Honours ==
Benfica

- Primeira Liga: 2018–19
- Supertaça Cândido de Oliveira: 2019

Hajduk Split

- Croatian Cup: 2021–22, 2022–23

Individual

- UEFA European Under-17 Championship Team of the Tournament: 2014
- Primeira Liga Defender of the Month: March 2019
