= Dario Melnjak =

Croatian footballer

Personal information
- Date of birth: 31 October 1992 (age 34)
- Place of birth: Varaždin, Croatia
- Height: 1.79 m (5 ft 10 in)
- Position: Left-back

Team information
- Current team: Hajduk Split
- Number: 17

Youth career
- –2005: Nedeljanec
- 2005–2007: Varteks
- 2007–2010: Nedeljanec

Senior career*
Years	Team	Apps	(Gls)
2010	Nedeljanec		
2011–2013	Zelina	63	(1)
2013–2015	Slaven Belupo	40	(3)
2015–2017	Lokeren	16	(0)
2016	→ Neftçi (loan)	10	(0)
2017	→ Slaven Belupo (loan)	13	(1)
2017–2019	Domžale	43	(8)
2019–2021	Çaykur Rizespor	79	(7)
2021–	Hajduk Split	130	(6)

International career
2019–2021	Croatia	8	(0)
- * Club domestic league appearances and goals as of 15 June 2026

Dario Melnjak (born 31 October 1992) is a Croatian professional footballer who plays as a left-back for Croatian Football League club Hajduk Split.

== Early and personal life ==
Melnjak was born on 31 October 1992 in Varaždin, Croatia. At just two weeks old, he had severe surgery due to a tange of his intestines, with tiny chances of survival.

Melnjak's uncles Antun and Zvonko were handball players, so did his cousins, Alen and Nenad. Apart from his native Croatian, Melnjak speaks, English, Greek, and Turkish.

== Club career ==
Melnjak started his career in the lower tier Nedeljanec, spending most of his youth career there, apart from two seasons at Varteks at under-15 level.

On 2 February 2015, Melnjak signed a contract with Belgian club Sporting Lokeren for three-and-a-half seasons.

On 20 June 2016, he signed for Azerbaijan Premier League club Neftçi on loan. On 10 November 2016, Neftçi and Lokeren mutually agreed to the early termination of his loan.

On 23 September 2021, Melnjak signed a one-year contract with Croatian club HNK Hajduk Split, with an option for a further two years.

On 19 January 2022, he extended his contract for two years until 2024. On 2 March 2022, Melnjak scored two goals against HNK Gorica in the 2021–22 Croatian Football Cup semi-final, taking Hajduk Split to the final in a 2–1 victory. In the 2022 Croatian Football Cup final on 26 May 2022, he scored twice again, this time in a 3–1 victory against HNK Rijeka to help his club winning its seventh cup and first since 2012–13.

== International career ==
On 11 June 2019, Melnjak made his Croatia national team debut in friendly match against Tunisia.

== Honours ==
Hajduk Split

- Croatian Cup: 2021–22, 2022–23
