= Sava-Arangel Čestić =

Serbian footballer

Sava Čestić
Personal information
- Full name: Sava-Arangel Čestić
- Date of birth: 19 February 2001 (age 25)
- Place of birth: Offenbach am Main, Germany
- Height: 1.92 m (6 ft 4 in)
- Position: Centre-back

Team information
- Current team: Voluntari
- Number: 6

Youth career
- 2006–2011: SG Rosenhöhe Offenbach
- 2011–2015: Kickers Offenbach
- 2015–2016: FSV Frankfurt
- 2016–2019: Schalke 04
- 2019–2020: 1. FC Köln

Senior career*
Years	Team	Apps	(Gls)
2020–2021	1. FC Köln II	28	(2)
2020–2022	1. FC Köln	11	(0)
2022	Rijeka	8	(0)
2023–2026	Heracles Almelo	21	(0)
2026–	Voluntari	4	(1)

International career^{‡}
2017	Serbia U17	3	(0)
2017–2020	Serbia U19	4	(0)
2021	Serbia U21	4	(0)
2021	Serbia	2	(0)
- * Club domestic league appearances and goals as of 2 November 2026 ‡ National team caps and goals as of 11 June 2021

Sava-Arangel Čestić (Serbian: Сава-Аранђел Честић, romanized: Sava-Aranđel Čestić; born 19 February 2001) is a professional footballer who plays as a centre-back for Liga I club Voluntari. Born in Germany, he played for the Serbia national team.

== Club career ==
A native of Offenbach am Main, Čestić began his youth career with local outfits SG Rosenhöhe and Kickers Offenbach. In 2015, he joined the youth academy of FSV Frankfurt, from where he transferred to Bundesliga team Schalke 04. In July 2019, he joined the academy of 1.FC Köln. On 28 November 2020, he made his professional debut for Köln in an away game at Borussia Dortmund. The day after his debut, it was reported that Čestić had extended his contract with the club until July 2024. On 7 January 2022, his contract with Köln was terminated with immediate effect.

On 10 January 2022, it was announced that Čestić had signed with the Croatian club Rijeka, but his contract was terminated after six months. On 22 December 2022, he signed a contracted with the Dutch club Heracles Almelo.

== International career ==
He made his debut for the Serbia national team on 7 June 2021 in a friendly against Jamaica.

== Career statistics ==
=== Club ===
As of match played 2 November 2026

Appearances and goals by club, season and competition
Club	Season	League			National cup (Note: Includes Croatian Cup, KNVB Beker, Cupa României)		Europe		Other		Total	
Club	Season	Division	Apps	Goals	Apps	Goals	Apps	Goals	Apps	Goals	Apps	Goals
1. FC Köln II	2020–21	Regionalliga West	12	2	–		–		–		12	2
1. FC Köln II	2021–22	Regionalliga West	16	0	–		–		–		16	0
1. FC Köln II	Total		28	2	–		–		–		28	2
1. FC Köln	2020–21	Bundesliga	11	0	0	0	–		0	0	11	0
1. FC Köln	2021–22	Bundesliga	0	0	0	0	–		–		0	0
1. FC Köln	Total		11	0	0	0	–		0	0	11	0
Rijeka	2021–22	1. HNL	8	0	1	0	–		–		9	0
Heracles Almelo	2022–23	Eerste Divisie	8	0	1	0	–		–		9	0
Heracles Almelo	2023–24	Eredivisie	6	0	0	0	–		–		6	0
Heracles Almelo	2024–25	Eredivisie	0	0	0	0	–		–		0	0
Heracles Almelo	2025–26	Eredivisie	7	0	1	0	–		–		8	0
Heracles Almelo	Total		21	0	2	0	–		–		23	0
Voluntari	2026–27	Liga I	4	0	1	0	–		–		5	0
Career Total			72	2	4	0	–		0	0	76	2

=== International ===
As of 11 June 2021

Appearances and goals by national team and year
National team	Year	Apps	Goals
Serbia	2021	2	0
Total		2	0

== Honours ==
Rijeka

- Croatian Cup runner-up: 2021–22

Heracles Almelo

- Eerste Divisie: 2022–23
