= Andrés Solano =

Colombian footballer (born 1998)

Personal information
- Full name: Andrés Felipe Solano Dávila
- Date of birth: 24 February 1998 (age 28)
- Place of birth: Santa Marta, Colombia
- Height: 1.76 m (5 ft 9 in)
- Position: Right-back

Youth career
- 2014–2017: Atlético Madrid

Senior career*
Years	Team	Apps	(Gls)
2017–2022	Atlético Madrid B	72	(2)
2019–2022	Atlético Madrid	1	(0)
2020–2021	→ Barcelona B (loan)	2	(0)
2022–2023	Rijeka	14	(0)

International career
2019	Colombia U23	5	(0)
- * Club domestic league appearances and goals as of 1 July 2023

Andrés Felipe Solano Dávila (born 24 February 1998) is a Colombian professional footballer who plays as a right-back.

== Club career ==
Solano joined the youth academy of Atlético Madrid at the age of 16. He was promoted to Atlético Madrid B ahead of 2017–18 season. He made his debut for the reserves on 20 August 2017, in a 3–1 win against Gimnástica Segoviana. He made his La Liga debut on 9 March 2019, in a 1–0 win against Leganés.

On 2 October 2020, FC Barcelona B announced the signing of Solano on a season long loan deal with an option to buy. He made his debut in a 1–0 home win over Gimnàstic de Tarragona the following 18 October.

On 1 November 2020, Solano suffered a cruciate ligament rupture during the 0–0 draw against AE Prat. Following a successful surgery, he was ruled out for the rest of the season.
