= Jorge Obregón =

Colombian professional footballer (born 1997)

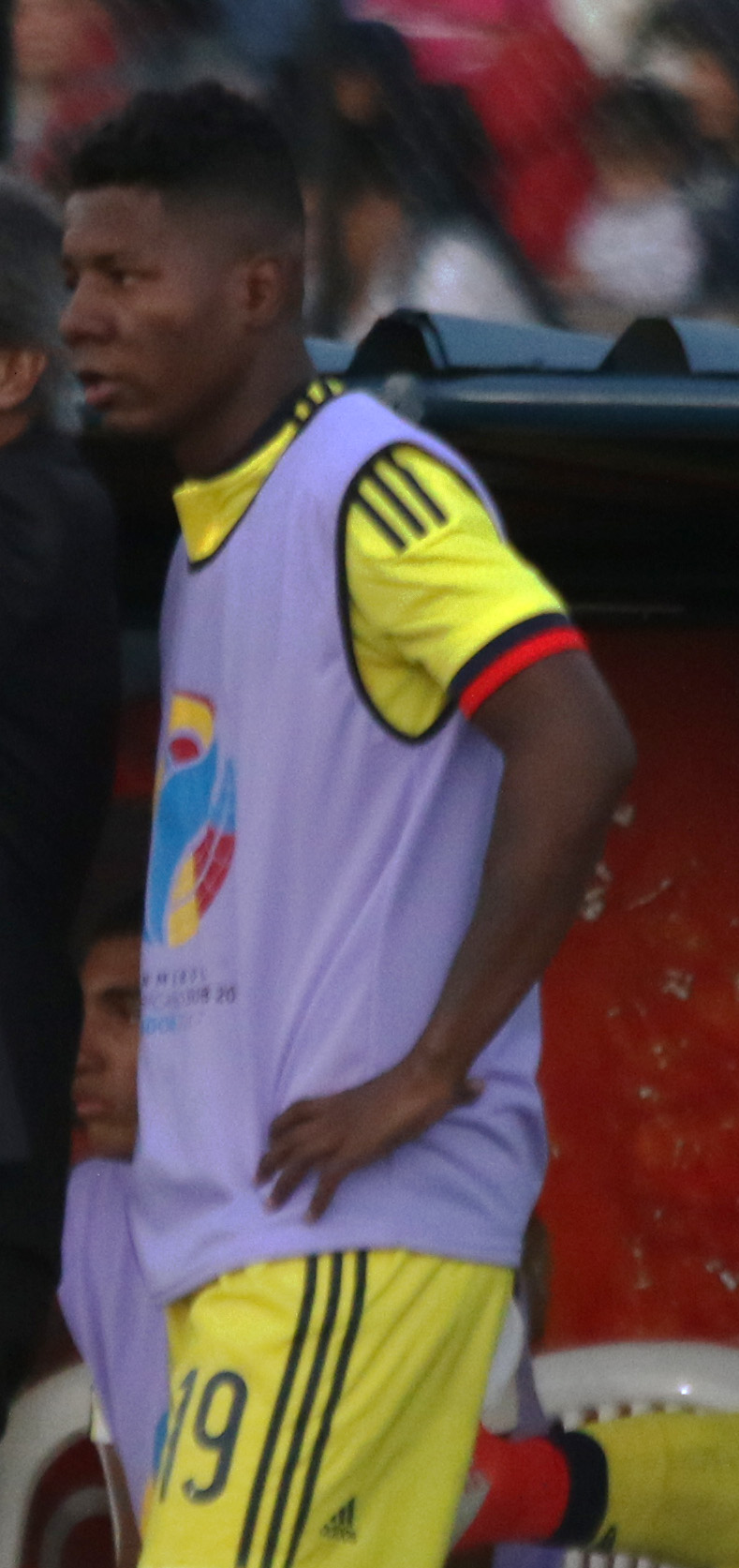
- Obregón with Colombia U20 during the 2017 South American U-20 Championship.

Personal information
- Full name: Jorge Leonardo Obregón Rojas
- Date of birth: 29 March 1997 (age 29)
- Place of birth: Puerto Tejada, Colombia
- Height: 1.82 m (6 ft 0 in)
- Position: Forward

Team information
- Current team: Águilas Doradas
- Number: 99

Youth career
- Boca Juniors de Cali
- Santa Fe

Senior career*
Years	Team	Apps	(Gls)
2015–2019	Santa Fe	10	(0)
2016	→ Llaneros (loan)	26	(9)
2018	→ Real Cartagena (loan)	35	(10)
2019	→ Jaguares de Córdoba (loan)	12	(0)
2019	Deportivo Municipal	14	(2)
2020–2021	Varaždin	45	(10)
2021–2024	Rijeka	84	(14)
2024–2025	Johor Darul Ta'zim	22	(7)
2025–	Águilas Doradas	14	(3)

International career
2017	Colombia U20	8	(1)
- * Club domestic league appearances and goals as of 12 December 2025

Jorge Leonardo Obregón Rojas (born 29 March 1997) is a Colombian professional footballer who plays as a forward for Águilas Doradas.

== Club career ==
=== Santa Fe ===
Obregón was promoted to Santa Fe senior squad in 2015. He make his professional career debut on 1 November coming on as a substitution in the 88th minute against Envigado.

Obregón returned from his Llaneros loan on 11 February 2017 and stayed with Santa Fe for the 2017 season.

==== Llaneros (loan) ====
In January 2016, Obregón was sent on loan to Colombian second division side Llaneros. He make his debut on 14 February 2016 against Barranquilla. On 15 October 2016, Obregón scored his first professional career goal by scoring a brace in a 4–3 league win over Deportivo Pereira.

==== Real Cartagena (loan) ====
In January 2018, Obregón was loaned to Real Cartagena for the 2018 Categoría Primera B season.

Jaguares de Córdoba (loan)

In January 2019, Obregón was loaned out to Jaguares de Córdoba for the 2019 Categoría Primera A season.

=== Deportivo Municipal ===
On 17 July 2019, Obregón signed for Peruvian first division club Deportivo Municipal. He scored his first goal for the club on 8 September in a 2–1 lost against Sport Boys.

=== Varaždin ===
On 10 February 2020, Obregón moved to Europe to signed with Croatian club Varaždin. He scored his first goal for the club in a 3–1 lost against Dinamo Zagreb on 6 June 2020. Obregón then scored the only goal in the match to help his team secured the 3 points against Inter Zaprešić on 25 June 2020.

On 12 May 2021, Obregón assisted twice which helped his team to draw 2–2 against Croatian giants Dinamo Zagreb.

=== Rijeka ===
After Varaždin got relegated from Prva HNL at the end of 2020–21 season, Rijeka signed Obregón on 5 July 2021. He make his debut for the club on 17 July in a league match against Gorica. Obregón was instrumental during the 2021–22 Croatian Football Cup where he scored in the second round, round of 16 and the quarter-finals which helped his team to reached the semi-finals, however he didn't make an appearance in the semis due to an injury he sustained. Obregón was part of the team run to the final but however lost 3–1 to Hajduk Split.

On 11 February 2024, Obregón scored a brace in a 2–0 win over Gorica.

=== Johor Darul Ta'zim ===
On 28 August 2024, Obregón moved to Southeast Asia to joined Malaysian giants Johor Darul Ta'zim. He scored a brace on his debut during a league match against Penang in a 5–0 win on 12 September 2024. During the 2024–25 AFC Champions League Elite match against Chinese club Shanghai Shenghua on 1 October, Obregón scored the second goal of the match with a header right which ended up with a 3–0 victorious for Johor Darul Ta'zim.

== International career ==
In January 2017, Obregón was called up to the Colombia under-20 squad for the 2017 South American U-20 Championship. On 21 January, he scored his first international goal in a 4–3 lost to Ecuador under-20. He would then assist Ever Valencia to scored the only goal which secured a 3 points win against Chile under-20 on 26 January.

== Career statistics ==
As of 1 Oct 2024

Appearances and goals by club, season and competition
Club	Season	League			National cup		League cup		Continental		Other		Total	
Club	Season	Division	Apps	Goals	Apps	Goals	Apps	Goals	Apps	Goals	Apps	Goals	Apps	Goals
Real Cartagena (loan)	2018	Categoría Primera B	35	10	3	0	0	0	0	0	–		38	10
Jaguares de Córdoba (loan)	2019	Categoría Primera A	12	0	3	0	0	0	0	0	–		15	0
Deportivo Municipal	2019	Peruvian Primera División	14	2	0	0	0	0	0	0	–		14	2
Varaždin	2019–20	Croatian Football League	11	3	0	0	–		0	0	–		11	3
Varaždin	2020–21	Croatian Football League	34	7	2	1	–		0	0	–		36	8
Varaždin	Total		45	10	2	1	0	0	0	0	0	0	47	11
Rijeka	2021–22	Croatian Football League	27	4	4	3	–		6	0	–		37	3
Rijeka	2022–23	Croatian Football League	26	3	1	0	–		2	0	–		29	3
Rijeka	2023–24	Croatian Football League	31	7	3	0	–		3	0	–		37	7
Rijeka	2024–25	Croatian Football League	0	0	0	0	–		2	0	–		2	0
Rijeka	Total		84	14	8	3	0	0	13	0	0	0	105	17
Johor Darul Ta'zim	2024–25	Malaysia Super League	8	5	0	0	3	0	10	1	–		21	6
Career total			198	41	16	4	3	0	23	1	0	0	175	3

== Honours ==
Johor Darul Ta'zim

- Malaysia Super League: 2024–25
- Malaysia Cup: 2024–25
- Malaysia Charity Shield: 2025
