= Prince Ampem =

Ghanaian footballer

Personal information
- Full name: Prince Obeng Ampem
- Date of birth: 13 April 1998 (age 28)
- Place of birth: Sunyani, Ghana
- Height: 1.69 m (5 ft 7 in)
- Position: Winger

Team information
- Current team: Shanghai Port (on loan from Eyüpspor)
- Number: 17

Youth career
- WAFA

Senior career*
Years	Team	Apps	(Gls)
2015–2018	WAFA		
2018	→ Šibenik (loan)	14	(4)
2018–2021	Šibenik	73	(15)
2021–2023	Rijeka	67	(8)
2023–	Eyüpspor	82	(17)
2026–	→ Shanghai Port (loan)	24	(7)
- * Club domestic league appearances and goals as of 8 November 2026

Prince Obeng Ampem (born 13 April 1998) is a Ghanaian professional footballer who played as a winger for Chinese Super League club Shanghai Port, on loan from Süper Lig club Eyüpspor.

== Career ==
As a youth player, Ampem was spotted by scouts from Feyenoord, one of the Netherlands' most successful clubs, who signed him for their affiliate, the West African Football Academy, where he also gained the attention of Austrian side Red Bull Salzburg.

In 2018, Ampem signed for Šibenik in the Croatian top flight.

In August 2023, Ampem signed for TFF First League club Eyüpspor.

On 25 February 2026, Ampem was loaned to Chinese Super League club Shanghai Port.

== Career statistics ==
As of matches played 8 November 2026

Appearances and goals by club, season and competition
Club	Season	League			National cup		Continental		Other		Total	
Club	Season	Division	Apps	Goals	Apps	Goals	Apps	Goals	Apps	Goals	Apps	Goals
Šibenik (loan)	2017–18	2. HNL	14	4	0	0	—		—		14	4
Šibenik	2018–19	2. HNL	25	7	2	0	—		2 (Note: Appearances in Promotion Play-off)	0	29	7
Šibenik	2019–20	2. HNL	18	4	3	0	—		—		21	4
Šibenik	2020–21	1. HNL	30	4	2	0	—		—		32	4
Šibenik	Total		73	15	7	0	—		2	0	82	15
Rijeka	2021–22	1. HNL	32	3	4	0	6	2	—		42	5
Rijeka	2022–23	HNL	35	5	2	0	2	0	—		39	5
Rijeka	Total		67	8	6	0	8	2	—		81	10
Eyüpspor	2023–24	TFF 1. Lig	33	11	0	0	—		—		33	11
Eyüpspor	2024–25	Süper Lig	29	4	4	0	—		—		33	4
Eyüpspor	2025–26	Süper Lig	20	2	1	0	—		—		21	2
Eyüpspor	Total		82	17	5	0	—		—		87	17
Shanghai Port (loan)	2026	Chinese Super League	24	7	2	1	4	6	1 (Note: Appearance in Chinese Super Cup)	0	31	14
Career total			260	51	20	1	12	8	3	0	295	60
