= NK Oriolik =

Croatian football club

- Full name: Nogometni klub Oriolik
- Founded: 1923; 103 years ago
- Ground: Igralište NK Oriolik
- Capacity: 1,500
- Chairman: Dominik Milinković
- Manager: Josip Markovinović
- League: MŽNL SB-PŽ
Home colours	Away colours

NK Oriolik is a Croatian football club based in Oriovac. The club's notable successes were appearances in the Croatian Cup, and best result was reaching the second round in the 2008–09 edition.
