= Issah Abass =

Ghanaian footballer (born 1998)

Personal information
- Date of birth: 26 September 1998 (age 28)
- Place of birth: Asokwa, Ghana
- Height: 1.73 m (5 ft 8 in)
- Positions: Winger; forward

Team information
- Current team: Radnički Niš
- Number: 8

Youth career
- Asokwa Deportivo

Senior career*
Years	Team	Apps	(Gls)
- Asokwa Deportivo
2017	→ Olimpija Ljubljana (loan)	9	(2)
2017–2018	Olimpija Ljubljana	32	(9)
2018–2022	Mainz 05	3	(0)
2019–2020	→ Utrecht (loan)	15	(2)
2019	→ Jong Utrecht (loan)	2	(3)
2021	→ Twente (loan)	8	(0)
2021–2022	→ Rijeka (loan)	26	(3)
2022–2024	Chaves	33	(4)
2024	→ Sepahan (loan)	5	(0)
2025	Jedinstvo Ub	31	(9)
2026–	Radnički Niš	15	(3)

International career
2019	Ghana U23	3	(0)
- * Club domestic league appearances and goals as of 13 June 2026

Issah Abass (born 26 September 1998) is a Ghanaian professional footballer who plays as a winger or forward for Serbian club Radnički Niš.

== Club career ==
On 31 August 2018, the last day of the 2018 summer transfer window, Abass joined Bundesliga side 1. FSV Mainz 05. On 6 January 2020, Abass joined Dutch club FC Twente on a loan deal until the end of the season.

On 31 August 2022, his contract with Mainz was dissolved by mutual consent.

In September 2022, Abass moved to Portugal, joining Primeira Liga side Chaves.

On 8 February 2024, Chaves sent Abass on loan to Persian Gulf Pro League club Sepahan until the end of the 2023–24 season.

== International career ==
Whilst playing domestic football in Ghana, Abass represented Ghana U17.

== Honours ==
Olimpija Ljubljana

- Slovenian PrvaLiga: 2017–18
- Slovenian Cup: 2017–18

Sepahan

- Iranian Hazfi Cup: 2023–24
