= Denis Bušnja =

Croatian footballer

Personal information
- Full name: Denis Bušnja
- Date of birth: 14 April 2000 (age 26)
- Place of birth: Varaždin, Croatia
- Height: 1.71 m (5 ft 7 in)
- Position: Winger

Team information
- Current team: Posušje
- Number: 23

Youth career
- 2011–2014: Čakovec
- 2014–2015: Međimurje
- 2015–2019: Rijeka

Senior career*
Years	Team	Apps	(Gls)
2018–2023	Rijeka	49	(2)
2019–2020	→ Istra 1961 (loan)	15	(0)
2020–2021	→ Sereď (loan)	27	(4)
2023	→ Bravo (loan)	15	(1)
2023	Dinamo Tbilisi	12	(1)
2024	BG Pathum United	7	(0)
2024	→ Muangthong United (loan)	8	(0)
2025	Lokomotiva	9	(0)
2026–	Posušje	9	(0)

International career
2015	Croatia U16	2	(0)
2018–2019	Croatia U19	6	(1)
2019	Croatia U20	2	(0)
2021	Croatia U21	3	(0)
- * Club domestic league appearances and goals as of 12 June 2026

Denis Bušnja (born 14 April 2000) is a Croatian professional footballer who plays as a winger for Bosnian club Posušje.

== Career statistics ==
=== Club ===
As of 19 May 2024

Appearances and goals by club, season and competition
Club	Season	League			National cup		League cup		Continental		Other		Total	
Club	Season	Division	Apps	Goals	Apps	Goals	Apps	Goals	Apps	Goals	Apps	Goals	Apps	Goals
Rijeka	2018–19	1. HNL	12	0	2	1	—		0	0	—		14	1
Rijeka	2019–20	1. HNL	3	0	—		—		0	0	0	0	3	0
Rijeka	2021–22	1. HNL	24	2	4	4	—		5	2	—		33	8
Rijeka	2022–23	1. HNL	10	0	1	0	—		2	0	—		13	0
Rijeka	Total		49	2	7	5	—		7	2	0	0	63	9
Istra 1961 (loan)	2019–20	1. HNL	15	0	1	0	—		—		0	0	16	0
Sered (loan)	2020–21	Slovak Super Liga	27	4	3	1	—		—		—		30	5
Bravo (loan)	2022–23	Slovenian PrvaLiga	15	1	1	0	—		—		—		16	0
Dinamo Tbilisi	2023	Erovnuli Liga	12	1	1	0	—		—		—		13	1
BG Pathum United	2023–24	Thai League 1	7	0	—		0	0	—		—		7	0
Career total			125	8	13	6	0	0	7	2	0	0	145	15

== Honours ==
Rijeka

- Croatian Cup: 2019
