= 2022–23 HNK Rijeka season =

Rijeka
2022–23 season
- President: Damir Mišković
- Head coach: Goran Tomić (until 28 May 2022); Dragan Tadić (20 Jun 2022 - 16 Aug 2022); Fausto Budicin (16 Aug 2022 - 5 Sep 2022); Serse Cosmi (5 Sep 2022 - 13 Nov 2022); Sergej Jakirović (since 30 Nov 2022)
- Stadium: Rujevica
- HNL: 4th
- Croatian Cup: Second round
- UEFA Europa Conference League: Second qualifying round
- Top goalscorer: League: Matija Frigan (14); All: Matija Frigan (14)
- Highest home attendance: 8,191 v. Dinamo Zagreb (21 May 2023)
- Lowest home attendance: 3,000 v. Slaven Belupo (25 February 2023)
- Average home league attendance: 4,891

The 2022–23 season was the 77th season in the existence of HNK Rijeka and the club's 32nd consecutive season in the top flight of Croatian football. In addition to the domestic league, Rijeka participated in this season's editions of the Croatian Cup and the UEFA Europa Conference League.

== Competitions ==
=== Overall ===
Competition	First match	Last match	Starting round	Final position	Record							
Competition	First match	Last match	Starting round	Final position	Pld	W	D	L	GF	GA	GD	Win %
SuperSport HNL	16 July 2022	May 2022	Matchday 1	4th	36	14	7	15	44	44	+0	38.89
Croatian Cup	19 October 2022	9 November 2022	First round	Second Round	2	0	1	1	2	3	−1	0.00
UEFA Europa Conference League	21 July 2022	28 July 2022	Second qualifying round	Second qualifying round	2	0	0	2	1	4	−3	0.00
Total					40	14	8	18	47	51	−4	35.00

Last updated: 28 May 2023
Source: Soccerway

=== SuperSport HNL ===
==== League table ====
Pos	Team	Pld	W	D	L	GF	GA	GD	Pts	Qualification or relegation
2	Hajduk Split	36	21	8	7	65	41	+24	71	Qualification to Europa Conference League third qualifying round (Note: Hajduk qualified for the Europa Conference League third qualifying round by winning the 2022–23 Croatian Football Cup.)
3	Osijek	36	13	11	12	46	41	+5	50	Qualification to Europa Conference League second qualifying round
4	Rijeka	36	14	7	15	44	44	0	49	Qualification to Europa Conference League second qualifying round
5	Istra 1961	36	11	13	12	36	38	−2	46	
6	Varaždin	36	12	10	14	41	51	−10	46	

Source: SuperSport HNL
Rules for classification: 1) Points; 2) Head-to-head points; 3) Head-to-head goal difference; 4) Head-to-head goals scored (at home if two teams tied); 5) Goal difference; 6) Goals scored; 7) Play-off
(Note: Criteria 2-4 and 7 is only used if deciding champion, teams to international competition or teams for relegation and in that case criteria 6 will not be used).

==== Results summary ====
Overall								Home						Away					
Pld	W	D	L	GF	GA	GD	Pts	W	D	L	GF	GA	GD	W	D	L	GF	GA	GD
36	14	7	15	44	44	0	49	6	4	8	21	23	−2	8	3	7	23	21	+2

Last updated: 28 May 2023.
Source: SuperSport HNL

==== Results by round ====
Round	1	2	3	4	5	6	7	8	9	10	11	12	13	14	15	16	17	18	19	20	21	22	23	24	25	26	27	28	29	30	31	32	33	34	35	36
Ground	A	A	H	A	H	A	H	A	H	H	H	A	H	A	H	A	H	A	A	A	H	A	H	A	H	A	H	H	H	A	H	A	H	A	H	A
Result	W	L	D	L	L	D	L	L	L	D	L	W	W	L	L	W	L	D	W	W	W	W	L	W	W	L	D	W	W	L	W	W	D	L	L	D
Position	4	6	5	8	9	9	10	10	10	9	10	9	8	9	9	7	8	8	8	8	8	6	7	7	5	6	6	4	3	3	3	3	3	3	4	4

Updated to match(es) played on 28 May 2023. Source: SuperSport HNL
A = Away; H = Home; W = Win; D = Draw; L = Loss

=== Results by opponent ===
Team	Results				Points
Team	1	2	3	4	Points
Dinamo Zagreb	1–3	2–7	0–1	1–2	0
Gorica	1–1	2–0	2–0	0–1	7
Hajduk Split	0–2	0–1	2–1	2–0	6
Istra 1961	1–1	0–1	2–0	2–2	5
Lokomotiva	1–3	3–0	2–1	2–0	9
Osijek	0–3	1–1	1–1	1–1	3
Slaven Belupo	0–1	1–2	0–1	3–1	3
Šibenik	1–0	0–0	2–1	1–0	10
Varaždin	1–2	3–0	3–1	0–2	6

Source: 2022–23 Croatian Football League article

== Matches ==
=== SuperSport HNL ===
16 July 2022 1	Šibenik	0–1	Rijeka	Šibenik
21:00 CEST (UTC+02:00)	Čop (yellow card) 26'; Skorup (yellow card) 36'	Report	Vučkić (yellow card) 14'; Vukčević (yellow card) 62'; Obregón 74'	Stadium: Šubićevac; Attendance: 1,678; Referee: Duje Strukan (Split)

31 July 2022 3	Rijeka	1–1	Gorica	Rijeka
21:00 CEST (UTC+02:00)	Frigan 39'; Hodža (yellow card) 53'; Álvarez (yellow card) 81'; Labrović (yellow card) 90+3'	Report	Raspopović (yellow card) 34'; Kalik 77' (yellow card) 90+3'; A. M. Jurić (yellow card) 84'; D. Jurić (yellow card) 84'	Stadium: Rujevica; Attendance: 4,000; Referee: Tihomir Pejin (Donji Miholjac)

7 August 2022 4	Lokomotiva	3–1	Rijeka	Zagreb
21:00 CEST (UTC+02:00)	Goričan 14'; Çokaj 19'; Vasilj 79'	Report	Karrica 35'; Lepinjica (yellow card) 37'; Bušnja (yellow card) 76'; Krešić (yellow card) 88'	Stadium: Kranjčevićeva; Attendance: 1,023; Referee: Dario Bel (Osijek)

14 August 2022 5	Rijeka	0–1	Slaven Belupo	Rijeka
21:00 CEST (UTC+02:00)	Bušnja (yellow card) 73'	Report	Bosec (yellow card) 65'; Crnac 70'	Stadium: Rujevica; Attendance: 4,087; Referee: Jakov Titlić (Hrvace)

21 August 2022 6	Istra 1961	1–1	Rijeka	Pula
18:55 CEST (UTC+02:00)	Galilea (yellow card) 8'; Petković 26'; Kadušić (yellow card) 40'; Marin (yellow card) 71'; Mlinar (yellow card) 75'	Report	Vučkić 5'; Vrančić (yellow card) 47'; M. Pavlović (yellow card) 81'; Selahi (yellow card) 84'	Stadium: Aldo Drosina; Attendance: 2,422; Referee: Zdenko Lovrić (Đakovo)

27 August 2022 7	Rijeka	1–2	Varaždin	Rijeka
21:05 CEST (UTC+02:00)	M. Pavlović (yellow card) 11' (yellow-red card) 73'; Djouahra 47'; Vrančić (yellow card) 53'; Bušnja (yellow card) 76'; Selahi (yellow card) 88'; Jurišić (yellow card) 90+2'	Report	Teklić (yellow card) 48' (goal) 74' (pen.); Banovec (yellow card) 67'; Kolarić 87'	Stadium: Rujevica; Attendance: 3,721; Referee: Ante Čuljak (Zagreb)

2 September 2022 8	Dinamo Zagreb	3–1	Rijeka	Zagreb
20:00 CEST (UTC+02:00)	Lauritsen 28' (yellow card) 57'; Špikić 30'; Oršić 60'; Ljubičić (yellow card) 79'	Report	Vlasenko (yellow card) 14' (goal) 84'; Liber (yellow card) 43'; Frigan (yellow card) 69'; Lunetta (yellow card) 90+3'	Stadium: Maksimir; Attendance: 5,894; Referee: Igor Pajač (Sveti Ivan Zelina)

10 September 2022 9	Rijeka	0–3	Osijek	Rijeka
18:30 CEST (UTC+02:00)	M. Pavlović (yellow card) 9'; Liber (yellow card) 55'; Vlasenko (yellow card) 70'	Report	Miérez 36' (yellow card) 37'; Caktaš 44' 63'	Stadium: Rujevica; Attendance: 3,825; Referee: Ante Čulina (Zagreb)

14 September 2022 2	Hajduk Split	2–0	Rijeka	Split
16:30 CEST (UTC+02:00)	Awaziem (yellow card) 45'; Biuk 66'; N. Kalinić 76'; Mikanović (yellow card) 76'; Kalik (yellow card) 90'	Report	Vukčević (yellow card) 14'; Galešić (yellow card) 22'; Obregón (yellow card) 23'; Lunetta (yellow card) 76' (yellow-red card) 84'	Stadium: Poljud; Attendance: 13,687; Referee: Dario Bel (Osijek)

18 September 2022 10	Rijeka	0–0	Šibenik	Rijeka
15:00 CEST (UTC+02:00)	D. Pavlović (yellow card) 42'; Hodža (yellow card) 45+2'; Vukčević (yellow card) 79'; Álvarez (yellow card) 82'; Selahi (yellow card) 89'; Krešić (yellow card) 90+3'	Report	Mesa (yellow card) 23'; M. Matić (yellow card) 45'; Delić (yellow card) 47'; Dolček (yellow card) 65'; Perić (yellow card) 86'; B. Matić (yellow card) 89'	Stadium: Rujevica; Attendance: 3,371; Referee: Fran Jović (Zagreb)

2 October 2022 11	Rijeka	0–1	Hajduk Split	Rijeka
15:00 CEST (UTC+02:00)	Lunetta (yellow card) 42'; Smolčić (yellow card) 45+2'; Krešić (yellow card) 49'; Vrančić (yellow card) 69'; Karrica (yellow card) 90+4'	Report	Awaziem (yellow card) 16' (goal) 51'; Fossati (yellow card) 45'; Kalik (yellow card) 46'; L. Kalinić (yellow card) 90'	Stadium: Rujevica; Attendance: 5,844; Referee: Igor Pajač (Sveti Ivan Zelina)

9 October 2022 12	Gorica	0–2	Rijeka	Velika Gorica
17:10 CEST (UTC+02:00)	Jovičić (yellow card) 58'; Ndockyt (yellow card) 68'; Fruk (yellow card) 71'; Banić (yellow card) 72'; Francois (yellow card) 90'	Report	Vukčević (yellow card) 13'; Álvarez (yellow card) 21'; Hodža (yellow card) 21'; Ampem 56'; Halilović (yellow card) 66' (goal) 68' (pen.)	Stadium: Radnik; Attendance: 1,437; Referee: Duje Strukan (Split)

16 October 2022 13	Rijeka	3–0	Lokomotiva	Rijeka
17:10 CEST (UTC+02:00)	M. Pavlović (yellow card) 19' (yellow-red card) 81'; Frigan 26' 78'; Vučkić 39' (pen.); Grgić (yellow card) 52'	Report	Marić (yellow card) 3'; Pivarić (yellow card) 21'; de Haas (yellow card) 38' (yellow-red card) 75'	Stadium: Rujevica; Attendance: 4,118; Referee: Zdenko Lovrić (Đakovo)

23 October 2022 14	Slaven Belupo	2–1	Rijeka	Koprivnica
17:10 CEST (UTC+02:00)	Hoxha 45'; Marina (yellow card) 66'; Krstanović 79' (pen.)	Report	Vučkić 49'; Vukčević (yellow card) 58'; Selahi (yellow card) 76'; Álvarez (red card) 78'	Stadium: Gradski; Attendance: 1,413; Referee: Ante Čulina (Zagreb)

29 October 2022 15	Rijeka	0–1	Istra 1961	Rijeka
15:00 CEST (UTC+02:00)	Ampem (yellow card) 3'; Selahi (yellow card) 32'; D. Pavlović (yellow card) 37'; Hodža (yellow card) 78'	Report	Perković (yellow card) 4'; Hujber (yellow card) 16'; Marešić (yellow card) 61'; Erceg 63' (yellow card) 82'; Boultam (yellow card) 90+4'	Stadium: Rujevica; Attendance: 3,755; Referee: Dario Bel (Osijek)

6 November 2022 16	Varaždin	0–3	Rijeka	Varaždin
15:00 CET (UTC+01:00)	Ba (red card) 45'; Brodić (yellow card) 49'; Herrera (yellow card) 64'; Jelenić (yellow card) 90+1'	Report	Frigan 47'; Álvarez (yellow card) 72'; Selahi 85'; Grgić 90+2'	Stadium: Varteks; Attendance: 2,673; Referee: Duje Strukan (Split)

13 November 2022 17	Rijeka	2–7	Dinamo Zagreb	Rijeka
17:30 CET (UTC+01:00)	Lunetta 47'; Bušnja (yellow card) 82' (red card) 82'; Vrančić 90+1'	Report	Mišić 2'; Oršić 13' 44'; Špikić 27'; J. Šutalo 56' (yellow card) 58'; Emreli 72' (yellow card) 73' (goal) 85'	Stadium: Rujevica; Attendance: 5,586; Referee: Dario Bel (Osijek)

21 January 2023 18	Osijek	1–1	Rijeka	Osijek
15:00 CET (UTC+01:00)	Špoljarić 9'	Report	Frigan 38' (pen.); Vukčević (yellow card) 45+1'; Galešić (yellow card) 61'	Stadium: Gradski Vrt; Attendance: 2,082; Referee: Patrik Kolarić (Čakovec)

28 January 2023 19	Šibenik	1–2	Rijeka	Šibenik
15:00 CET (UTC+01:00)	Delić (penalty missed) 7' 7'; Knežević (red card) 12'; Rogić (yellow card) 13'; Mina (yellow card) 35'; Grdić (yellow card) 45'	Report	Frigan 4'; Dilaver (yellow card) 6'; Obregón 87'	Stadium: Šubićevac; Attendance: 960; Referee: Zdenko Lovrić (Đakovo)

5 February 2023 20	Hajduk Split	1–2	Rijeka	Split
17:30 CET (UTC+01:00)	Livaja 90' (pen.) (penalty missed) 90+6'	Report	Frigan (yellow card) 47' (goal) 83'; Ampem 65'; Janković (yellow card) 74'	Stadium: Poljud; Attendance: 13,098; Referee: Ante Čulina (Zagreb)

12 February 2023 21	Rijeka	2–0	Gorica	Rijeka
17:10 CET (UTC+01:00)	Vukčević (yellow card) 26'; Marin 50' (pen.); Hodža (yellow card) 61'; Liber 83'	Report	Suk (yellow card) 13'; Petković (yellow card) 24'; Bralić (yellow card) 54'; Mrzljak (yellow card) 63'	Stadium: Rujevica; Attendance: 4,479; Referee: Patrik Kolarić (Čakovec)

18 February 2023 22	Lokomotiva	1–2	Rijeka	Zagreb
17:10 CET (UTC+01:00)	Mersinaj (yellow card) 43'; Marić 90+2'	Report	Frigan 10'; Janković (yellow card) 37'; Obregón 69'; Veiga (yellow card) 87'; Smolčić (yellow card) 90+3'	Stadium: Kranjčevićeva; Attendance: 1,102; Referee: Patrik Kolarić (Čakovec)

25 February 2023 23	Rijeka	0–1	Slaven Belupo	Rijeka
18:10 CET (UTC+01:00)	Selahi (yellow card) 38'; Liber (yellow card) 90+7'	Report	Hoxha (yellow card) 50'; Talys (yellow card) 56'; Crnac 85'; Mudražija (yellow card) 90+3'	Stadium: Rujevica; Attendance: 3,000; Referee: Igor Pajač (Sveti Ivan Zelina)

3 March 2023 24	Istra 1961	0–2	Rijeka	Pula
17:00 CET (UTC+01:00)	Erceg (yellow card) 43' (yellow-red card) 90'; Petrusenko (yellow card) 57'; Mlinar (red card) 70'; Galilea (yellow card) 89'	Report	Janković 22' 90+5' (pen.); Banda (yellow card) 45'; Frigan (yellow card) 90'	Stadium: Aldo Drosina; Attendance: 3,019; Referee: Jakov Titlić (Hrvace)

12 March 2023 25	Rijeka	3–1	Varaždin	Rijeka
15:00 CET (UTC+01:00)	Selahi 45'; Ampem 53'; Banda 59'; Goda (yellow card) 77'	Report	Ba (yellow card) 38'; Puclin (yellow card) 39'; Drožđek (yellow card) 57'; Jelenić 88'	Stadium: Rujevica; Attendance: 5,114; Referee: Dario Bel (Osijek)

19 March 2023 26	Dinamo Zagreb	1–0	Rijeka	Zagreb
17:30 CET (UTC+01:00)	Ristovski 67'	Report		Stadium: Maksimir; Attendance: 11,243; Referee: Menelaos Antoniou (Cyprus)

2 April 2023 27	Rijeka	1–1	Osijek	Rijeka
15:00 CEST (UTC+02:00)	Frigan 31' (pen.); Vukčević (yellow card) 50'; Dilaver (yellow card) 90+3'	Report	Jugović (yellow card) 83'; Žaper 90+4'	Stadium: Rujevica; Attendance: 5,864; Referee: Duje Strukan (Split)

8 April 2023 28	Rijeka	1–0	Šibenik	Rijeka
19:10 CEST (UTC+02:00)	Frigan 48'	Report	Đorić (yellow card) 45'; Soldo (yellow card) 61'	Stadium: Rujevica; Attendance: 4,437; Referee: Zdenko Lovrić (Đakovo)

16 April 2023 29	Rijeka	2–0	Hajduk Split	Rijeka
18:00 CEST (UTC+02:00)	Frigan 9'; Marin 76'	Report	Pukštas (yellow card) 87'	Stadium: Rujevica; Attendance: 7,749; Referee: Igor Pajač (Sveti Ivan Zelina)

23 April 2023 30	Gorica	1–0	Rijeka	Velika Gorica
15:00 CEST (UTC+02:00)	Fruk (yellow card) 6'; Raspopović (yellow card) 12' (yellow-red card) 80'; Fućak (yellow card) 60' (goal) 63'	Report	Frigan (yellow card) 22'; Hodža (yellow card) 85'; Banda (yellow card) 90+4'	Stadium: Radnik; Attendance: 2,362; Referee: Ante Čulina (Zagreb)

27 April 2023 31	Rijeka	2–0	Lokomotiva	Rijeka
18:00 CEST (UTC+02:00)	Selahi (yellow card) 50'; Frigan 65'; Liber 67'	Report	Marić (yellow card) 69'	Stadium: Rujevica; Attendance: 4,248; Referee: Duje Strukan (Split)

1 May 2023 32	Slaven Belupo	1–3	Rijeka	Koprivnica
18:10 CEST (UTC+02:00)	Krstanović 47'; Boras (yellow card) 90+2'	Report	Ampem 1'; Hodža 20'; Goda (yellow card) 45'; Frigan 79'	Stadium: Gradski; Attendance: 1,313; Referee: Patrik Kolarić (Čakovec)

6 May 2023 33	Rijeka	2–2	Istra 1961	Rijeka
19:10 CEST (UTC+02:00)	Frigan 73' (pen.); Labrović (yellow card) 76'; Ampem 90+7'	Report	Galilea (yellow card) 17' (yellow-red card) 38'; L. Marin (yellow card) 20'; Kadušić 31'; Bakrar 50'; Erceg (yellow card) 83'; Ćorić (yellow card) 86'	Stadium: Rujevica; Attendance: 6,657; Referee: Igor Pajač (Sveti Ivan Zelina)

14 May 2023 34	Varaždin	2–0	Rijeka	Varaždin
17:00 CEST (UTC+02:00)	Pilj (yellow card) 39'; Domjanić 47'; Teklić 58'; Elezi (yellow card) 68'	Report	Goda (yellow card) 28'; Hodža (yellow card) 52'; Frigan (yellow card) 90+1'	Stadium: Varteks; Attendance: 1,662; Referee: Ante Čulina (Zagreb)

21 May 2023 35	Rijeka	1–2	Dinamo Zagreb	Rijeka
19:30 CEST (UTC+02:00)	Marin 90+1'	Report	Ivanušec 43'; Moharrami 62'; Mišić (yellow card) 79'	Stadium: Rujevica; Attendance: 8,191; Referee: Duje Strukan (Split)

27 May 2023 36	Osijek	1–1	Rijeka	Osijek
19:00 CEST (UTC+02:00)	Mitrović 65' (o.g.); Barišić (yellow card) 69'; Barešić (yellow card) 90+4'; Miérez (penalty missed) 90+7'	Report	Veiga (yellow card) 13'; Banda 31'; Galešić (yellow card) 41' (yellow-red card) 90+4'; Mitrović (yellow card) 61'; Liber (yellow card) 90+3'	Stadium: Gradski Vrt; Attendance: 11,522; Referee: Patrik Kolarić (Čakovec)

=== Croatian Cup ===
19 October 2022 R1	Moslavina	1–1 (4–5 p)	Rijeka	Kutina
15:00 CEST (UTC+02:00)	Lončarević 33'; Batarelo (yellow card) 50'; Bača (yellow card) 77'; Bajlović (yellow card) 117'	Report	Krešić (yellow card) 32'; Bušnja 65'	Stadium: Gradski stadion Kutina; Attendance: 1,000; Referee: Ivan Čužić (Velika Gorica)
	Penalties
	Batarelo (penalty scored); Bača (penalty missed); Škurla (penalty scored); Peranić (penalty scored); Novak (penalty scored)		Álvarez (penalty scored); Frigan (penalty scored); Ampem (penalty scored); Djouahra (penalty scored); Galešić (penalty scored)

9 November 2022 R2	BSK Bijelo Brdo	2–1	Rijeka	Bijelo Brdo
13:00 CET (UTC+01:00)	Tokich 11'; Mišić (yellow card) 41'; Župan (yellow card) 56'; Pušić (yellow card) 64'; Pudić 75'	Report	Lunetta 7'; Álvarez (yellow card) 90'	Stadium: Bijelo Brdo; Attendance: 756; Referee: Jakov Titlić (Hrvace)

=== UEFA Europa Conference League ===
21 July 2022 QR2	Rijeka (Croatia)	1–2	(Sweden) Djurgårdens IF	Rijeka, Croatia
20:30 CEST (UTC+02:00)	Vučkić 13'; Krešić (yellow card) 77'; M. Pavlović (yellow card) 81'	Report	Finndell 38'; Edvardsen 54'; Hien (yellow card) 80'; Andersson (yellow card) 90+3'	Stadium: Rujevica; Attendance: 6,473; Referee: Christian-Petru Ciochirca (Austria)

28 July 2022 QR2	Djurgårdens IF (Sweden)	2–0 (4–1 agg.)	(Croatia) Rijeka	Stockholm, Sweden
19:00 CEST (UTC+02:00)	Asoro (yellow card) 29'; Hien 55'; Schüller (yellow card) 67'; Edvardsen (yellow card) 75'; Banda 84'; Radetinac (yellow card) 90+6'	Report	Hodža (yellow card) 29'; M. Pavlović (yellow card) 90+6'	Stadium: Tele2 Arena; Attendance: 18,605; Referee: Snir Levy (Israel)

=== Friendlies ===
==== Pre-season ====
24 June 2022 Friendly	Rijeka (Croatia)	6–0	(Slovenia) Brinje Grosuplje	Rijeka, Croatia
19:00 CEST (UTC+02:00)	Bušnja 4'; Vučkić 33' (pen.); Obregón 42' (pen.); Frigan 55'; Stanić 62'; Vrančić 80'	Report		Stadium: Rujevica (training ground); Attendance: Behind closed doors Referee: Antonio Melnjak (Rijeka)

28 June 2022 Friendly	Rijeka (Croatia)	1–0	(Serbia) Radnički 1923	Kranjska Gora, Slovenia
18:00 CEST (UTC+02:00)	Vučkić 45+3'; Lepinjica (yellow card) (yellow-red card) 73'	Report		Stadium: SRC Ruteč; Attendance: 100; Referee: Marko Podgoršek (Kranj)

1 July 2022 Friendly	Rijeka (Croatia)	1–1	(Slovenia) Bravo	Kranjska Gora, Slovenia
18:00 CEST (UTC+02:00)	Karrica 85'	Report	Trontelj 9'; Šaranić (penalty missed) 68'	Stadium: SRC Ruteč; Referee: Anže Jerič (Kranj)

5 July 2022 Friendly	Rijeka (Croatia)	5–1	(Slovenia) Triglav Kranj	Kranjska Gora, Slovenia
18:00 CEST (UTC+02:00)	Bušnja 7'; Frigan 31'; Dujmović 35'; Lepinjica 49'; Vučkić 69'	Report	Bunič 53'	Stadium: SRC Ruteč

6 July 2022 Friendly	Sparta Prague (Czech Republic)	2–0	(Croatia) Rijeka	Villach, Austria
17:00 CEST (UTC+02:00)	Daněk 55'; Juliš 61' (pen.)	Report		Stadium: Stadion Villach-Lind

9 July 2022 Friendly	Rijeka (Croatia)	1–2	(Slovenia) Koper	Rijeka, Croatia
20:00 CEST (UTC+02:00)	Bušnja 11'	Report	Kotnik 65'; Jašaragić 85'	Stadium: Rujevica; Attendance: 2,500; Referee: Antonio Melnjak (Rijeka)

==== On-season (2022) ====
24 September 2022 Friendly	Rijeka (Croatia)	4–0	(Slovenia) Celje	Rijeka, Croatia
15:00 CEST (UTC+02:00)	Vučkić 52' 57'; Karrica 62'; Obregón 77' (pen.)	Report	Popović (yellow card)	Stadium: Rujevica; Attendance: Behind closed doors Referee: Antonio Melnjak (Rijeka)

28 September 2022 Friendly	Turbina Tribalj	0–12	Rijeka	Tribalj
16:30 CEST (UTC+02:00)		Report	Bušnja 21'; Frigan 43' 65' 70' 78' 84'; Djuricin 50' (pen.) 83' 87'; Lunetta 57' 74'; Galešić 62'	Stadium: Podhumac; Attendance: 350; Referee: Marko Linić (Rijeka)

==== Mid-season ====
10 December 2022 Friendly	Rijeka	6–0	Grobničan	Rijeka
13:30 CET (UTC+01:00)	Frigan 40'; Vrančić (penalty missed) 57'; Obregón 62' 80'; Okechukwu 73' (o.g.); Marin 82'; Halilović 89' (pen.)	Report		Stadium: Rujevica (training ground); Attendance: Behind closed doors Referee: Marin Rožman (Rijeka)

16 December 2022 Friendly	Rijeka	1–2	Slaven Belupo	Rijeka
12:30 CET (UTC+01:00)	Marin 41'	Report	Krstanović 32'; Hoxha 34'	Stadium: Rujevica; Attendance: Behind closed doors Referee: Marin Rožman (Rijeka)

22 December 2022 Friendly	Juventus (Italy)	1–0	(Croatia) Rijeka	Turin, Italy
14:00 CET (UTC+01:00)	Kean 74'	Report	Vukčević (yellow card) 8'	Stadium: Juventus Stadium; Attendance: Behind closed doors Referee: Davide Ghersini (Genoa)

4 January 2023 Friendly	Rijeka (Croatia)	14–0	(Slovakia) Dolný Kubín	Rijeka, Croatia
15:00 CET (UTC+01:00)	Jurić 3' 43'; Janković 6' 26'; Frigan 13' (pen.) 42'; Djouahra 47' 79'; Hodža 48' 65' 84'; Djuricin 49'; Ampem 70'; Smolčić 87'	Report		Stadium: Rujevica (training ground); Attendance: Behind closed doors Referee: Marin Rožman (Rijeka)

6 January 2023 Friendly	Rijeka	0–0	Gorica	Rijeka
15:00 CET (UTC+01:00)		Report		Stadium: Rujevica; Attendance: Behind closed doors Referee: Antonio Melnjak (Rijeka)

13 January 2023 Friendly	Rijeka (Croatia)	1–1	(Hungary) Honvéd	Rijeka, Croatia
13:00 CET (UTC+01:00)	Djuricin (penalty missed) 17'; Gajzler 70'	Report	Krajcsovics 5'	Stadium: Rujevica (training ground); Attendance: Behind closed doors Referee: Antonio Melnjak (Rijeka)

13 January 2023 Friendly	Rijeka (Croatia)	2–0	(Hungary) Honvéd	Rijeka, Croatia
17:00 CET (UTC+01:00)	Frigan (yellow card) 16'; Marin 45' 89'; Janković (yellow card) 76'	Report	Kocsis (yellow card) 5'; Gomis (yellow card) 20' (yellow-red card) 28'; Zsótér (yellow card) 30'	Stadium: Rujevica; Attendance: 2,000; Referee: Marin Rožman (Rijeka)

==== On-season (2023) ====
22 January 2023 Friendly	Rijeka	1–1	Orijent	Rijeka
11:00 CET (UTC+01:00)	Banda 25'	Report	Monjac 33'	Stadium: Rujevica; Attendance: Behind closed doors

25 March 2023 Friendly	Rijeka (Croatia)	1–1	(Slovenia) Celje	Rijeka, Croatia
17:00 CET (UTC+01:00)	Obregón 64'	Report	Kouter 84'	Stadium: Rujevica; Attendance: 1,200; Referee: Bojan Blaškić

== Player seasonal records ==
Updated 28 May 2023. Competitive matches only.

=== Goals ===
Rank	Name	League	Europe	Cup	Total
1	(Croatia) Matija Frigan	14	–	–	14
2	(Ghana) Prince Ampem	5	–	–	5
3	(Slovenia) Haris Vučkić	3	1	–	4
4	(Croatia) Antonio Marin	3	–	–	3
4	(Colombia) Jorge Obregón	3	–	–	3
6	(Zambia) Emmanuel Banda	2	–	–	2
6	(Croatia) Niko Janković	2	–	–	2
6	(Croatia) Adrian Liber	2	–	–	2
6	(Albania) Lindon Selahi	2	–	–	2
6	(Italy) Gabriel Lunetta	1	–	1	2
11	(France) Naïs Djouahra	1	–	–	1
11	(Croatia) Alen Grgić	1	–	–	1
11	(Croatia) Alen Halilović	1	–	–	1
11	(Croatia) Veldin Hodža	1	–	–	1
11	(Albania) Bernard Karrica	1	–	–	1
11	(Switzerland) Nikita Vlasenko	1	–	–	1
11	(Bosnia and Herzegovina) Mario Vrančić	1	–	–	1
11	(Croatia) Denis Bušnja	–	–	1	1
TOTALS		44	1	2	47

Source: Competitive matches

=== Clean sheets ===
Rank	Name	League	Europe	Cup	Total
1	(Croatia) Nediljko Labrović	10	–	–	10
TOTALS		10	0	0	10

Source: Competitive matches

=== Disciplinary record ===
Number	Position	Player	HNL			Europe			Croatian Cup			Total		
Number	Position	Player	Yellow card	(yellow card) (yellow-red card)	Red card	Yellow card	(yellow card) (yellow-red card)	Red card	Yellow card	(yellow card) (yellow-red card)	Red card	Yellow card	(yellow card) (yellow-red card)	Red card
1	GK	(Croatia) Nediljko Labrović	2	0	0	0	0	0	0	0	0	2	0	0
3	DF	(Croatia) Bruno Goda	3	0	0	0	0	0	0	0	0	3	0	0
4	MF	(Croatia) Niko Janković	2	0	0	0	0	0	0	0	0	2	0	0
4	DF	(Croatia) Mateo Pavlović	2	2	0	2	0	0	0	0	0	4	2	0
5	DF	(Croatia) Niko Galešić	2	1	0	0	0	0	0	0	0	2	1	0
6	DF	(Croatia) Matej Mitrović	1	0	0	0	0	0	0	0	0	1	0	0
7	MF	(Bosnia and Herzegovina) Mario Vrančić	3	0	0	0	0	0	0	0	0	3	0	0
8	MF	(Croatia) Adrian Liber	4	0	0	0	0	0	0	0	0	4	0	0
9	FW	(Colombia) Jorge Obregón	1	0	0	0	0	0	0	0	0	1	0	0
10	MF	(Croatia) Alen Halilović	1	0	0	0	0	0	0	0	0	1	0	0
11	MF	(Ghana) Prince Ampem	1	0	0	0	0	0	0	0	0	1	0	0
12	DF	(Montenegro) Andrija Vukčević	8	0	0	0	0	0	0	0	0	8	0	0
13	MF	(Croatia) Ivan Lepinjica	1	0	0	0	0	0	0	0	0	1	0	0
15	DF	(Croatia) Anton Krešić	3	0	0	1	0	0	1	0	0	5	0	0
18	MF	(Albania) Lindon Selahi	7	0	0	0	0	0	0	0	0	7	0	0
19	MF	(Slovenia) Haris Vučkić	1	0	0	0	0	0	0	0	0	1	0	0
21	DF	(Switzerland) Nikita Vlasenko	2	0	0	0	0	0	0	0	0	2	0	0
22	MF	(Zambia) Emmanuel Banda	2	0	0	0	0	0	0	0	0	2	0	0
22	DF	(Croatia) Roko Jurišić	1	0	0	0	0	0	0	0	0	1	0	0
23	MF	(Croatia) Denis Bušnja	4	0	1	0	0	0	0	0	0	4	0	1
24	FW	(Croatia) Matija Frigan	5	0	0	0	0	0	0	0	0	5	0	0
25	MF	(Croatia) Veldin Hodža	7	0	0	1	0	0	0	0	0	8	0	0
28	DF	(Croatia) Ivan Smolčić	2	0	0	0	0	0	0	0	0	2	0	0
32	DF	(Croatia) Alen Grgić	1	0	0	0	0	0	0	0	0	1	0	0
40	MF	(Spain) Pablo Álvarez	4	0	1	0	0	0	1	0	0	5	0	1
47	MF	(Serbia) Damjan Pavlović	2	0	0	0	0	0	0	0	0	2	0	0
66	DF	(Austria) Emir Dilaver	2	0	0	0	0	0	0	0	0	2	0	0
77	DF	(Portugal) Danilo Veiga	2	0	0	0	0	0	0	0	0	2	0	0
80	MF	(Albania) Bernard Karrica	1	0	0	0	0	0	0	0	0	1	0	0
96	MF	(Italy) Gabriel Lunetta	2	1	0	0	0	0	0	0	0	2	1	0
TOTALS			79	4	2	4	0	0	2	0	0	85	4	2

Source: nk-rijeka.hr

=== Appearances and goals ===
Number	Position	Player	Apps	Goals	Apps	Goals	Apps	Goals	Apps	Goals
Number	Position	Player	Total		HNL (Note: First number represents appearances in starting eleven, while the second number indicates a substitute appearance.)		Conference League		Croatian Cup	
1	GK	(Croatia) Nediljko Labrović	38	0	36+0	0	2+0	0	0+0	0
3	DF	(Croatia) Bruno Goda	11	0	6+5	0	0+0	0	0+0	0
4	MF	(Croatia) Niko Janković	19	2	16+3	2	0+0	0	0+0	0
4	DF	(Croatia) Mateo Pavlović	15	0	13+0	0	2+0	0	0+0	0
5	DF	(Croatia) Niko Galešić	26	0	23+2	0	0+0	0	1+0	0
6	DF	(Croatia) Matej Mitrović	5	0	4+1	0	0+0	0	0+0	0
7	MF	(Bosnia and Herzegovina) Mario Vrančić	15	1	6+7	1	1+0	0	1+0	0
8	MF	(Croatia) Adrian Liber	21	2	3+17	2	1+0	0	0+0	0
9	FW	(Colombia) Jorge Obregón	29	3	6+20	3	1+1	0	1+0	0
10	MF	(Croatia) Alen Halilović	11	1	5+3	1	0+2	0	1+0	0
11	MF	(Ghana) Prince Ampem	39	5	34+1	5	2+0	0	0+2	0
12	DF	(Montenegro) Andrija Vukčević	29	0	25+1	0	2+0	0	1+0	0
13	MF	(Croatia) Ivan Lepinjica	1	0	1+0	0	0+0	0	0+0	0
13	GK	(Bosnia and Herzegovina) Martin Zlomislić	2	0	0+0	0	0+0	0	2+0	0
14	FW	(Croatia) Niko Gajzler	1	0	0+1	0	0+0	0	0+0	0
15	DF	(Croatia) Anton Krešić	18	0	10+4	0	2+0	0	2+0	0
16	MF	(Croatia) Dominik Simčić	3	0	0+3	0	0+0	0	0+0	0
17	MF	(Croatia) Matej Vuk	1	0	0+1	0	0+0	0	0+0	0
18	MF	(Albania) Lindon Selahi	36	2	30+3	2	2+0	0	1+0	0
19	FW	(Slovenia) Haris Vučkić	12	4	9+1	3	2+0	1	0+0	0
20	DF	(Colombia) Andrés Solano	2	0	2+0	0	0+0	0	0+0	0
21	DF	(Switzerland) Nikita Vlasenko	5	1	2+2	1	0+0	0	1+0	0
22	MF	(Zambia) Emmanuel Banda	19	2	6+13	2	0+0	0	0+0	0
22	DF	(Croatia) Roko Jurišić	5	0	3+1	0	0+0	0	1+0	0
23	MF	(Croatia) Denis Bušnja	13	1	3+7	0	0+2	0	1+0	1
23	MF	(Bosnia and Herzegovina) Mato Stanić	3	0	0+3	0	0+0	0	0+0	0
24	FW	(Croatia) Matija Frigan	31	14	25+2	14	1+1	0	1+1	0
25	MF	(Croatia) Veldin Hodža	37	1	30+3	1	1+1	0	2+0	0
27	FW	(Bosnia and Herzegovina) Admir Bristrić	1	0	0+1	0	0+0	0	0+0	0
28	DF	(Croatia) Ivan Smolčić	25	0	14+7	0	2+0	0	1+1	0
29	MF	(Croatia) Andro Babić	1	0	0+1	0	0+0	0	0+0	0
30	MF	(Croatia) Bruno Bogojević	1	0	0+1	0	0+0	0	0+0	0
32	DF	(Croatia) Alen Grgić	30	1	14+14	1	0+0	0	1+1	0
39	FW	(Australia) Deni Jurić	6	0	0+6	0	0+0	0	0+0	0
40	MF	(Spain) Pablo Álvarez	12	0	5+3	0	1+1	0	1+1	0
44	MF	(Croatia) Antonio Marin	18	3	17+1	3	0+0	0	0+0	0
47	MF	(Serbia) Damjan Pavlović	8	0	5+1	0	0+0	0	1+1	0
55	DF	(Croatia) Duje Dujmović	1	0	0+1	0	0+0	0	0+0	0
66	DF	(Austria) Emir Dilaver	14	0	14+0	0	0+0	0	0+0	0
77	DF	(Portugal) Danilo Veiga	17	0	14+3	0	0+0	0	0+0	0
80	MF	(Albania) Bernard Karrica	7	1	1+3	1	0+1	0	1+1	0
92	FW	(Austria) Marco Djuricin	5	0	3+2	0	0+0	0	0+0	0
96	MF	(Italy) Gabriel Lunetta	8	2	3+4	1	0+0	0	1+0	1
99	MF	(France) Naïs Djouahra	21	1	8+11	1	0+0	0	0+2	0

Source: nk-rijeka.hr

=== Suspensions ===
Date Incurred	Competition	Player	Games Missed	Reason
27 Aug 2022	HNL	(Croatia) Denis Bušnja	1	Yellow card
27 Aug 2022	HNL	(Croatia) Mateo Pavlović	1	(yellow card) (yellow-red card)
14 Sep 2022	HNL	(Italy) Gabriel Lunetta	1	(yellow card) (yellow-red card)
18 Sep 2022	HNL	(Albania) Lindon Selahi	1	Yellow card
18 Sep 2022	HNL	(Montenegro) Andrija Vukčević	1	Yellow card
2 Oct 2022	HNL	(Croatia) Anton Krešić	1	Yellow card
2 Oct 2022	HNL	(Bosnia and Herzegovina) Mario Vrančić	1	Yellow card
9 Oct 2022	HNL	(Spain) Pablo Álvarez	1	Yellow card
9 Oct 2022	HNL	(Croatia) Veldin Hodža	1	Yellow card
16 Oct 2022	HNL	(Croatia) Mateo Pavlović	1	(yellow card) (yellow-red card)
23 Oct 2022	HNL	(Spain) Pablo Álvarez	1	Red card
13 Nov 2022	HNL	(Croatia) Denis Bušnja	2	Red card
21 Jan 2023	HNL	(Montenegro) Andrija Vukčević	1	Yellow card
25 Feb 2023	HNL	(Croatia) Adrian Liber	1	Yellow card
25 Feb 2023	HNL	(Albania) Lindon Selahi	1	Yellow card
3 Mar 2023	HNL	(Croatia) Matija Frigan	1	Yellow card
2 Apr 2023	HNL	(Austria) Emir Dilaver	1	Yellow card
23 Apr 2023	HNL	(Croatia) Veldin Hodža	1	Yellow card
14 May 2023	HNL	(Croatia) Bruno Goda	1	Yellow card
27 May 2023	HNL	(Croatia) Niko Galešić	1	(yellow card) (yellow-red card)

=== Penalties ===
For
Date	Competition	Player	Opposition	Scored?
9 Oct 2022	HNL	(Croatia) Alen Halilović	Gorica	✓
16 Oct 2022	HNL	(Slovenia) Haris Vučkić	Lokomotiva	✓
21 Jan 2023	HNL	(Croatia) Matija Frigan	Osijek	✓
12 Feb 2023	HNL	(Croatia) Antonio Marin	Gorica	✓
3 Mar 2023	HNL	(Croatia) Niko Janković	Istra 1961	✓
2 Apr 2023	HNL	(Croatia) Matija Frigan	Osijek	✓
6 May 2023	HNL	(Croatia) Matija Frigan	Istra 1961	✓
Against
Date	Competition	Goalkeeper	Opposition	Scored?
27 Aug 2022	HNL	(Croatia) Nediljko Labrović	Varaždin	✓
23 Oct 2022	HNL	(Croatia) Nediljko Labrović	Slaven Belupo	✓
28 Jan 2023	HNL	(Croatia) Nediljko Labrović	Šibenik	✗
5 Feb 2023	HNL	(Croatia) Nediljko Labrović	Hajduk Split	✓
5 Feb 2023	HNL	(Croatia) Nediljko Labrović	Hajduk Split	✗
27 May 2023	HNL	(Croatia) Nediljko Labrović	Osijek	✗

== Transfers ==
=== In ===
Date	Pos.	Player	Moving from	Type	Fee	Ref.
2 Jun 2022	LW	(Croatia) Filip Dujmović	(Croatia) Jarun	Transfer	Undisclosed	
10 Jun 2022	AM	(Spain) Pablo Álvarez	(Bulgaria) Cherno More	Transfer	Free	
14 Jun 2022	AM	(Slovenia) Haris Vučkić	(Spain) Real Zaragoza	Transfer	Free	
15 Jun 2022	GK	(Croatia) Antonio Frigan	(Croatia) Novigrad	Return from loan	—N/a	
15 Jun 2022	GK	(Nigeria) David Nwolokor	(Slovenia) Aluminij	Return from loan	—N/a	
15 Jun 2022	LB	(Croatia) Roko Jurišić	(Croatia) Hrvatski Dragovoljac	Return from loan	—N/a	
15 Jun 2022	CB	(Croatia) Tino Agić	(Slovenia) Gorica	Return from loan	—N/a	
15 Jun 2022	CB	(Croatia) Niko Galešić	(Croatia) Hrvatski Dragovoljac	Return from loan	—N/a	
15 Jun 2022	CB	(Niger) Djibrilla Ibrahim	(Croatia) Orijent 1919	Return from loan	—N/a	
15 Jun 2022	CB	(Croatia) Marko Putnik	(Croatia) Orijent 1919	Return from loan	—N/a	
15 Jun 2022	CB	(Croatia) Ivan Smolčić	(Croatia) Hrvatski Dragovoljac	Transfer	Free	
15 Jun 2022	RB	(Croatia) Filip Braut	(Croatia) Hrvatski Dragovoljac	Transfer	Free	
15 Jun 2022	DM	(Croatia) Veldin Hodža	(Croatia) Hrvatski Dragovoljac	Transfer	Free	
15 Jun 2022	DM	(Croatia) Marino Kukoč	(Croatia) Hrvatski Dragovoljac	Return from loan	—N/a	
15 Jun 2022	CM	(Bosnia and Herzegovina) Silvio Ilinković	(Bosnia and Herzegovina) Posušje	Return from loan	—N/a	
15 Jun 2022	AM	(Croatia) Filip Zrilić	(Croatia) Orijent 1919	Return from loan	—N/a	
15 Jun 2022	LW	(Albania) Bernard Karrica	(Croatia) Hrvatski Dragovoljac	Return from loan	—N/a	
15 Jun 2022	CF	(Bosnia and Herzegovina) Admir Bristrić	(Croatia) Hrvatski Dragovoljac	Return from loan	—N/a	
15 Jun 2022	CF	(Croatia) Matija Frigan	(Croatia) Hrvatski Dragovoljac	Return from loan	—N/a	
18 Jun 2022	CM	(Bosnia and Herzegovina) Mario Vrančić	(England) Stoke City	Loan (until 30/6/2023)	—N/a	
22 Jun 2022	CB	(Croatia) Mateo Pavlović	(France) Amiens	Transfer	Free	
1 Jul 2022	CB	(Croatia) Matej Mitrović	(Belgium) Club Brugge	Transfer	Free	
2 Jul 2022	CB	(Croatia) Anton Krešić	(Italy) Atalanta	Transfer	€150,000	
6 Jul 2022	AM	(Croatia) Alen Halilović	(England) Reading	Transfer	Free	
18 Jul 2022	CB	(Switzerland) Nikita Vlasenko	(Italy) Juventus U23	Transfer	Undisclosed	
2 Aug 2022	LW	(France) Naïs Djouahra	(Spain) Real Sociedad B	Transfer	€750,000	
5 Aug 2022	GK	(Croatia) Mislav Zadro	(Croatia) Dinamo Zagreb	Transfer	Free	
26 Aug 2022	RB	(Croatia) Alen Grgić	(Croatia) Osijek	Transfer	Free	
31 Aug 2022	LM	(Italy) Gabriel Lunetta	(Italy) Atalanta	Transfer	Free	
31 Aug 2022	MF	(Ghana) Jacob Aboosah	(Ghana) EurAfrica FC	Loan (until 30/6/2023; option to buy)	—N/a	
31 Aug 2022	MF	(Ghana) Prince Arthur	(Ghana) EurAfrica FC	Loan (until 30/6/2023; option to buy)	—N/a	
31 Aug 2022	CF	(Austria) Marco Djuricin	Austria Wien	Transfer	Undisclosed	
6 Sep 2022	DM	(Serbia) Damjan Pavlović	(Belgium) Standard Liège	Transfer	Free	
3 Nov 2022	RW	(Croatia) Bruno Bogojević	Free agent	Transfer	Free	
16 Nov 2022	LB	(Croatia) Bruno Goda	Free agent	Transfer	Free	
7 Dec 2022	LW	(Croatia) Antonio Marin	(Croatia) Dinamo Zagreb	Loan (until 15/6/2023; option to buy)	—N/a	
9 Dec 2022	CF	(Australia) Deni Jurić	(Croatia) Dinamo Zagreb	Loan (until 15/6/2023; option to buy)	—N/a	
13 Dec 2022	CB	(Austria) Emir Dilaver	(Croatia) Dinamo Zagreb	Transfer	Free	
27 Dec 2022	AM	(Croatia) Niko Janković	(Croatia) Dinamo Zagreb	Loan (until 18/1/2024)	—N/a	
3 Jan 2023	CM	(Zambia) Emmanuel Banda	(Sweden) Djurgårdens IF	Transfer	Free	
4 Jan 2023	DM	(Bosnia and Herzegovina) Mato Stanić	(Croatia) Varaždin	Return from loan	—N/a	
18 Jan 2023	RB	(Portugal) Danilo Veiga	(Portugal) Gil Vicente	Transfer	Free	
15 Feb 2023	CM	(Bosnia and Herzegovina) Mario Vrančić	(England) Stoke City	Transfer	Free	

Source: Glasilo Hrvatskog nogometnog saveza

=== Out ===
Date	Pos.	Player	Moving to	Type	Fee	Ref.
31 May 2022	CB	(Croatia) Hrvoje Smolčić	(Germany) Eintracht Frankfurt	Transfer	€2,500,000	
6 Jun 2022	CM	(Croatia) Domagoj Pavičić	(Turkey) Konyaspor	End of contract	Free	
6 Jun 2022	RW	(Croatia) Robert Murić	(Turkey) Konyaspor	Transfer	Undisclosed	
7 Jun 2022	CF	(Switzerland) Josip Drmić	(England) Norwich City	End of loan	—N/a	
10 Jul 2021	AM	(Croatia) Filip Zrilić	(Croatia) Orijent 1919	End of contract	Free	
14 Jun 2022	GK	(Croatia) Andrej Prskalo	(Croatia) Opatija	End of contract	Free	
14 Jun 2022	CB	(Serbia) Sava-Arangel Čestić	TBC	Released (mutual consent)	Free	
14 Jun 2022	CB	(North Macedonia) Darko Velkovski	(Saudi Arabia) Al-Ettifaq	End of contract	Free	
14 Jun 2022	AM	(Slovenia) Haris Vučkić	(Spain) Real Zaragoza	End of loan	—N/a	
14 Jun 2022	CF	(Ghana) Issah Abass	(Germany) Mainz 05	End of loan	—N/a	
27 Jun 2022	CB	(Croatia) Marko Putnik	(Croatia) Orijent 1919	End of contract	Free	
30 Jun 2022	CB	(Croatia) Anton Krešić	(Italy) Atalanta	End of loan	—N/a	
30 Jun 2022	CM	(Slovenia) Adam Gnezda Čerin	(Germany) Nürnberg	End of loan	—N/a	
5 Jul 2022	CM	(Bosnia and Herzegovina) Silvio Ilinković	(Bosnia and Herzegovina) Zrinjski Mostar	Released (mutual consent)	Free	
16 Jul 2022	CB	(Croatia) Tino Agić	(Slovenia) Gorica	Loan (until 30/6/2023)	—N/a	
28 Jul 2022	DM	(Bosnia and Herzegovina) Mato Stanić	(Croatia) Varaždin	Loan (until 30/6/2023)	—N/a	
5 Aug 2022	GK	(Croatia) Mislav Zadro	(Croatia) Orijent 1919	Dual registration	—N/a	
5 Aug 2022	CB	(Niger) Djibrilla Ibrahim	(Croatia) Orijent 1919	Dual registration	—N/a	
5 Aug 2022	RB	(Croatia) Filip Braut	(Croatia) Orijent 1919	Dual registration	—N/a	
5 Aug 2022	DM	(Croatia) Antonio Galešić	(Croatia) Grobničan	Dual registration	—N/a	
5 Aug 2022	AM	(Croatia) Karlo Valjan	(Croatia) Grobničan	Dual registration	—N/a	
5 Aug 2022	LW	(Croatia) Filip Dujmović	(Croatia) Orijent 1919	Dual registration	—N/a	
12 Aug 2022	DM	(Croatia) Ivan Lepinjica	(Germany) Arminia Bielefeld	Loan (until 30/6/2023; option to buy)	—N/a	
31 Aug 2022	MF	(Ghana) Jacob Aboosah	(Croatia) Grobničan	Dual registration	—N/a	
31 Aug 2022	MF	(Ghana) Prince Arthur	(Croatia) Grobničan	Dual registration	—N/a	
5 Sep 2022	AM	(Serbia) Dennis Stojković	(Bosnia and Herzegovina) Leotar	End of contract	Free	
6 Dec 2022	LW	(Croatia) Matej Vuk	(Croatia) Istra 1961	Released (mutual consent)	Free	
7 Dec 2022	AM	(Slovenia) Haris Vučkić	(Thailand) Buriram United	Transfer	Undisclosed	
15 Dec 2022	CF	(Bosnia and Herzegovina) Admir Bristrić	(Slovenia) Olimpija Ljubljana	Released (mutual consent)	Free	
30 Dec 2022	LB	(Croatia) Roko Jurišić	(Austria) Ried	Released (mutual consent)	Free	
4 Jan 2023	LM	(Italy) Gabriel Lunetta	(Italy) Südtirol	Loan (until 30/6/2023; option to buy)	—N/a	
14 Jan 2023	MF	(Ghana) Jacob Aboosah	(Ghana) EurAfrica FC	End of loan	—N/a	
14 Jan 2023	MF	(Ghana) Prince Arthur	(Ghana) EurAfrica FC	End of loan	—N/a	
25 Jan 2023	DM	(Serbia) Damjan Pavlović	(Sweden) Degerfors IF	Loan (until 31/12/2023; option to buy)	—N/a	
31 Jan 2023	CB	(Croatia) Mateo Pavlović	(France) Saint-Étienne	Loan (until 30/06/2023)	—N/a	
31 Jan 2023	RB	(Colombia) Andrés Solano	TBC	Released (mutual consent)	Free	
31 Jan 2023	AM	(Croatia) Alen Halilović	TBC	Released (mutual consent)	Free	
2 Feb 2023	LW	(Albania) Bernard Karrica	(Slovenia) Gorica	Loan (until 30/06/2023)	—N/a	
3 Feb 2023	LW	(Croatia) Dominik Simčić	(Croatia) Orijent	Dual registration	—N/a	
10 Feb 2023	DM	(Croatia) Marino Kukoč	(Croatia) Kustošija	Loan (until 30/06/2023)	—N/a	
14 Feb 2023	CM	(Bosnia and Herzegovina) Mario Vrančić	(England) Stoke City	End of loan	—N/a	
15 Feb 2023	CM	(Bosnia and Herzegovina) Mario Vrančić	(Bosnia and Herzegovina) Sarajevo	Loan (until 30/06/2023)	—N/a	
16 Feb 2023	CB	(Switzerland) Nikita Vlasenko	TBC	Released (mutual consent)	Free	
16 Feb 2023	LW	(Croatia) Denis Bušnja	(Slovenia) Bravo	Loan (until 30/06/2023; option to buy)	—N/a	
17 Feb 2023	LW	(Croatia) Filip Dujmović	(Croatia) Kustošija	Released (mutual consent)	Free	
24 Mar 2023	CM	(Canada) Antoine Coupland	(Canada) Whitecaps FC 2	Released (mutual consent)	Free	

Source: Glasilo Hrvatskog nogometnog saveza

Spending: ▼€900,000
Income: ▲€2,500,000
Expenditure: ▲€1,600,000
