= Mario Vrančić =

Bosnian footballer

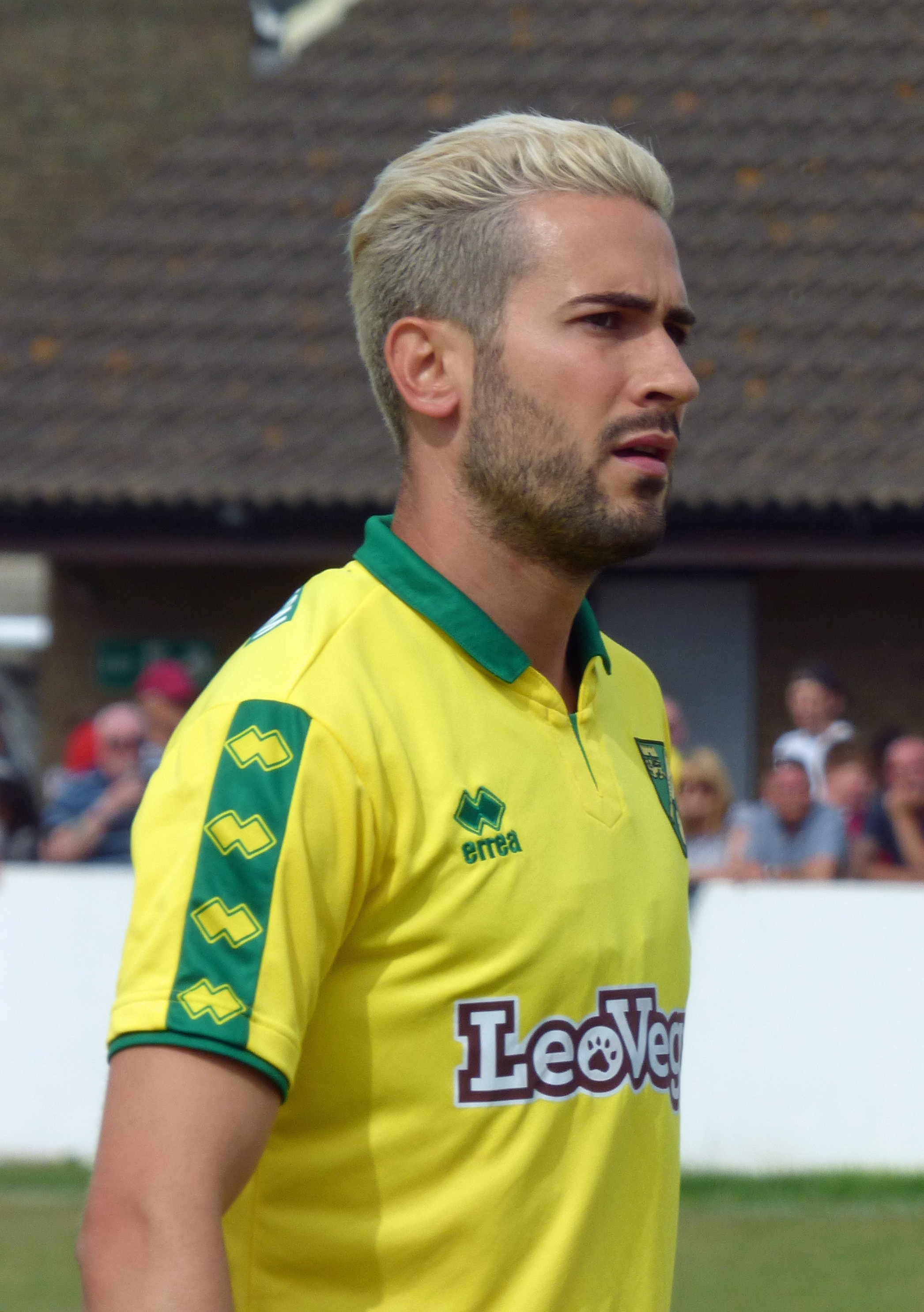
- Vrančić with Norwich City in 2017

Personal information
- Full name: Mario Vrančić
- Date of birth: 23 May 1989 (age 37)
- Place of birth: Slavonski Brod, SFR Yugoslavia
- Height: 1.87 m (6 ft 2 in)
- Position: Midfielder

Youth career
- 1996–2004: VfR Kesselstadt
- 2004–2006: Mainz 05

Senior career*
Years	Team	Apps	(Gls)
2006–2011	Mainz 05 II	45	(16)
2007–2011	Mainz 05	9	(0)
2009–2010	→ Rot Weiss Ahlen (loan)	12	(0)
2011–2012	Borussia Dortmund II	47	(16)
2012–2015	SC Paderborn	93	(12)
2015–2017	Darmstadt 98	45	(6)
2017–2021	Norwich City	123	(15)
2021–2022	Stoke City	30	(3)
2022	→ Rijeka (loan)	13	(1)
2023	Rijeka	0	(0)
2023	→ Sarajevo (loan)	14	(1)
2023	Sarajevo	8	(0)
2024–2026	Eintracht Frankfurt II	14	(2)

International career
2006	Germany U17	5	(0)
2007–2008	Germany U19	12	(1)
2008–2009	Germany U20	11	(3)
2015–2017	Bosnia and Herzegovina	6	(0)
- * Club domestic league appearances and goals as of 1 January 2025

Mario Vrančić (Bosnian pronunciation: [mâːrio ʋrâːntʃitɕ]; born 23 May 1989) is a Bosnian former professional footballer who most recently played as a midfielder for German Regionalliga club Eintracht Frankfurt II. He is the current sporting director of VfR Mannheim.

Vrančić started his professional career at Mainz 05, playing mainly in its reserve team. In 2009, he was sent on loan to Rot Weiss Ahlen. Two years later, he joined Borussia Dortmund II. The following year, he moved to SC Paderborn. Vrančić switched to Darmstadt 98 in 2015. In 2017, he was transferred to Norwich City. Four years later, Vrančić signed with Stoke City, who loaned him to Rijeka in 2022. In 2023, he signed with Rijeka, who then loaned him to Sarajevo.

A former German youth international, Vrančić made his senior international debut for Bosnia and Herzegovina in 2015, earning 6 caps until 2017.

== Club career ==
=== Early career ===
Vrančić started playing football at a local club, before joining youth academy of Mainz 05 in 2004. He made his professional debut with Mainz 05 II in 2006 at the age of 17. In June 2009, he was sent on a season-long loan to Rot Weiss Ahlen.

In January 2011, he moved to Borussia Dortmund II.

=== SC Paderborn ===
In May 2012, Vrančić signed a two-year deal with SC Paderborn. He made his official debut for the team on 3 August against Hertha BSC. On 11 August, he scored a brace in a triumph over VfL Bochum, which were his first goals for the side.

Vrančić was instrumental in SC Paderborn's first ever promotion to Bundesliga, which was sealed on 11 May 2014. He scored 5 goals and added 9 assists. The following day, he signed a new two-year contract with the team.

=== Darmstadt 98 ===
In June 2015, Vrančić was transferred to Darmstadt 98 for an undisclosed fee. He made his competitive debut for the club in DFB-Pokal game against TuS Erndtebrück on 7 August. Two weeks later, he made his league debut against Schalke 04. On 12 March 2016, he scored his first goal for Darmstadt 98 against FC Augsburg.

=== Norwich City ===
In June 2017, Vrančić joined English outfit Norwich City on a three-year deal. He debuted officially for the team on 5 August against Fulham. On 19 September, he scored a brace in EFL Cup game against Brentford, his first goals for the side. Six months later, he scored his first league goal in a defeat of Reading.

Vrančić was an important piece in Norwich City's conquest of Championship title, his first trophy with the club, which was secured on 5 May 2019 and earned them promotion to Premier League. He had an impact of 10 goals and 7 assists. In July, he extended his contract until June 2021.

Vrančić scored his first Premier League goal against Tottenham Hotspur on 28 December. He played his 100th game for the side in a loss to Manchester City on 26 July 2020.

=== Stoke City ===
In July 2021, Vrančić moved to Stoke City on a one-year deal. He made his debut on 7 August 2021 in a 3–2 victory against Reading. On 25 September 2021, he scored his first goal for Stoke against Hull City. He scored in victories over Peterborough United and Queens Park Rangers. In May 2022, he signed a one-year contract extension. Vrančić made 35 appearances for Stoke in 2021–22 as the team finished in 14th position.

=== Rijeka ===
On 18 June 2022, Vrančić signed for Croatian side Rijeka on loan for the 2022–23 season. He permanently signed for Rijeka in February 2023, being afterwards loaned to Bosnian Premier League side Sarajevo.

=== Eintracht Frankfurt II ===
On 11 June 2024, Vrančić signed with Regionalliga Südwest club Eintracht Frankfurt II.

== International career ==
Despite representing Germany at various youth levels, with whom he won the 2008 UEFA European Under-19 Football Championship, Vrančić decided to play for Bosnia and Herzegovina at senior level.

In June 2015, his request to change sports citizenship from German to Bosnian was approved by FIFA. Subsequently, he received his first senior call-up in August 2015, for UEFA Euro 2016 qualifiers against Belgium and Andorra. He debuted against the latter on 6 September.

== Personal life ==
Vrančić's older brother Damir is also a professional footballer.

== Career statistics ==
=== Club ===
As of match played 7 December 2024

Appearances and goals by club, season and competition
Club	Season	League			National cup (Note: Includes DFB-Pokal, FA Cup, Croatian Cup, Bosnia and Herzegovina Cup)		League cup (Note: Includes EFL Cup)		Continental		Total	
Club	Season	Division	Apps	Goals	Apps	Goals	Apps	Goals	Apps	Goals	Apps	Goals
Mainz 05 II	2006–07	Oberliga Südwest	1	0	—		—		—		1	0
Mainz 05 II	2007–08	Oberliga Südwest	13	9	—		—		—		13	9
Mainz 05 II	2008–09	Regionalliga West	19	7	—		—		—		19	7
Mainz 05 II	2010–11	Regionalliga West	12	0	—		—		—		12	0
Mainz 05 II	Total		45	16	—		—		—		45	16
Mainz 05	2006–07	Bundesliga	1	0	0	0	—		—		1	0
Mainz 05	2007–08	2. Bundesliga	5	0	1	0	—		—		6	0
Mainz 05	2008–09	2. Bundesliga	3	0	0	0	—		—		3	0
Mainz 05	Total		9	0	1	0	—		—		10	0
Rot Weiss Ahlen (loan)	2009–10	2. Bundesliga	12	0	0	0	—		—		12	0
Borussia Dortmund II	2010–11	Regionalliga West	15	2	—		—		—		15	2
Borussia Dortmund II	2011–12	Regionalliga West	32	14	—		—		—		32	14
Borussia Dortmund II	Total		47	16	—		—		—		47	16
SC Paderborn	2012–13	2. Bundesliga	33	5	1	0	—		—		34	5
SC Paderborn	2013–14	2. Bundesliga	30	5	1	0	—		—		31	5
SC Paderborn	2014–15	Bundesliga	30	2	1	0	—		—		31	2
SC Paderborn	Total		93	12	3	0	—		—		96	12
Darmstadt 98	2015–16	Bundesliga	22	2	3	0	—		—		25	2
Darmstadt 98	2016–17	Bundesliga	23	4	2	0	—		—		25	4
Darmstadt 98	Total		45	6	5	0	—		—		50	6
Norwich City	2017–18	Championship	35	1	1	0	3	2	—		39	3
Norwich City	2018–19	Championship	36	10	0	0	2	0	—		38	10
Norwich City	2019–20	Premier League	20	1	2	0	1	0	—		23	1
Norwich City	2020–21	Championship	32	3	1	0	1	0	—		34	3
Norwich City	Total		123	15	4	0	7	2	—		134	17
Stoke City	2021–22	Championship	30	3	2	0	3	0	—		35	3
Stoke City	2022–23	Championship	0	0	0	0	0	0	—		0	0
Stoke City	Total		30	3	2	0	3	0	—		35	3
Rijeka (loan)	2022–23	Prva HNL	13	1	1	0	—		1 (Note: Appearance(s) in the UEFA Europa Conference League)	0	15	1
Sarajevo (loan)	2022–23	Bosnian Premier League	14	1	—		—		—		14	1
Sarajevo	2023–24	Bosnian Premier League	8	0	0	0	—		2	0	10	0
Sarajevo	Total		22	1	0	0	—		2	0	24	1
Eintracht Frankfurt II	2024–25	Regionalliga Südwest	14	2	—		—		—		14	2
Career total			441	72	16	0	10	2	3	0	470	74

=== International ===
As of match played 28 March 2017

Appearances and goals by national team and year
National team	Year	Apps	Goals
Bosnia and Herzegovina
Bosnia and Herzegovina	2015	1	0
Bosnia and Herzegovina	2016	3	0
Bosnia and Herzegovina	2017	2	0
Total		6	0

== Honours ==
Norwich City

- EFL Championship: 2018–19, 2020–21

Germany U19

- UEFA European Under-19 Championship: 2008
