= 2021–22 Stoke City F.C. season =

Stoke City
2021–22 season
- Joint-Chairman: John Coates and Peter Coates
- Manager: Michael O'Neill
- Stadium: bet365 Stadium
- Championship: 14th
- FA Cup: Fifth round
- EFL Cup: Fourth round
- Top goalscorer: League: Jacob Brown (13); All: Jacob Brown (14)
- Highest home attendance: 26,384 v Blackpool (5 March 2022)
- Lowest home attendance: 17,720 v Swansea City (8 February 2022)
| Home colours | Away colours |

The 2021–22 season was Stoke City's 105th season in the Football League, and the 45th in the second tier.

Stoke had a busy summer transfer window with the permanent departure of 13 players, which enabled O'Neill to make several new additions to his squad. A new look squad began the season well, gaining 35 points from the first 23 matches and they were just outside the play-off places at the turn of the year. However a poor run of results from January saw Stoke drop down the league and finish in a mid-table position for a fourth consecutive season.

== Pre-season ==
Stoke announced their retained list on 1 June 2021 with Jordan Cousins the only senior player leaving whilst James Chester and John Obi Mikel signed one-year contract extensions. The club also posted a £87 million loss during the COVID-19 hit 2019–20 season with the losses blamed on the pandemic and "writing down" the value of the squad. Stoke were able to move on a number of players in the summer transfer window including, Benik Afobe, Moritz Bauer, Jordan Cousins, Peter Etebo, Lee Gregory, Mikel John Obi, Liam Lindsay, Bruno Martins Indi, Badou Ndiaye, Lasse Sørensen, Sam Vokes, Kevin Wimmer and Ryan Woods whilst Nathan Collins moved to Burnley for an estimated £12 million. Coming into the squad were goalkeeper Jack Bonham, striker Sam Surridge, midfielder Mario Vrančić and defender Ben Wilmot.

The Stoke squad returned to Clayton Wood for pre-season on 28 June 2021. They played a behind closed doors game against Scottish side Hibernian which ended in a 1–1 draw. Michael O'Neill then took a selected group of players for a week long training camp in Belfast. Stoke ended their week in Belfast with a 6–0 win over Linfield. On their return to England, Stoke beat Crewe Alexandra 3–2 at Gresty Road. Stoke then beat Aston Villa 2–0, lost 2–1 at Wigan Athletic before ending their pre-season schedule with a 1–1 draw against Wolverhampton Wanderers.

| Date | Opponent | Venue | Result | Scorers | Report |
|---|---|---|---|---|---|
| 9 July 2021 | Hibernian | H | 1–1 | Doughty 45' | Report |
| 17 July 2021 | Linfield | A | 6–0 | Brown (3), Fletcher, Powell, Wright-Phillips | Report |
| 20 July 2021 | Crewe Alexandra | A | 3–2 | Batth 1', Fletcher 27', Powell 44' | Report |
| 24 July 2021 | Aston Villa | H | 2–0 | Fletcher 4', Vrančić 49' | Report |
| 27 July 2021 | Wigan Athletic | A | 1–2 | Ince 42' | Report |
| 31 July 2021 | Wolverhampton Wanderers | H | 1–1 | Batth 27' | Report |

== Championship ==
=== August ===
Stoke began the season at home to Reading with supporters allowed back into stadiums for the first time since March 2020. Nick Powell scored the opening goal in the 25th minute but Reading equalised immediately through John Swift. Jacob Brown then nutmegged Rafael Cabral to restore Stoke's lead. Liam Moore brought the Royals back level before new signing Sam Surridge scored on his debut to earn Stoke a 3–2 victory and their first opening day win since 2009. The first away match of the season saw Stoke and Birmingham City cancel each other out in a goalless draw. They then put in an impressive performance away at last seasons beaten play-off finalists Swansea City, winning 3–1 with goals from Powell, Clucas and Østigård whilst Joël Piroe scored a late consolation for the Swans. Stoke continued their good start to the season with a 1–0 win against Nottingham Forest, Josh Tymon scoring his first goal for the club. City suffered their first defeat of the campaign on 28 August going down 3–0 at promotion favourites Fulham. On transfer deadline day Stoke brought in right-back Demeaco Duhaney on a short-term contract and forward Abdallah Sima on loan from Brighton.

=== September ===
After the international break Stoke faced Huddersfield Town. After the Terriers had taken the lead through Harry Toffolo just after half-time Stoke responded with Brown heading in a corner and an own goal from Matty Pearson which earned Stoke a 2–1 win and their best start to a season for 17 years. Stoke played Barnsley four days later and drew 1–1 with a Cauley Woodrow free-kick cancelling out Surridge's opener. The match ended in unsavoury fashion as after Tommy Smith had been sent-off for a foul on Claudio Gomes, tempers boiled over and a scuffle between coaching staff and players resulted in two Stoke staff and one Barnsley staff being dismissed. Stoke were then beaten 2–1 by Derby County who had announced their intention to enter administration the day before. Stoke bounced back with a 2–0 win against Hull City with Vrančić scoring his first goal for the club and Powell scoring a long range free-kick. Stoke missed several chances away at Preston North End with a Benjamin Whiteman free-kick cancelling out Powell's early header.

=== October ===
In the Midlands derby against West Bromwich Albion Stoke produced a dominant performance but were again guilty of poor finishing including a missed penalty from Surridge but with ten minutes remaining Powell lobbed Baggies keeper Sam Johnstone to earn Stoke a 1–0 victory. After the international break Stoke lost 2–1 at Sheffield United and 1–0 to league leaders AFC Bournemouth. They then lost a third match in a row, 2–1 away at Millwall despite Romaine Sawyers giving them a 20th minute lead. Stoke ended a unproductive October by blowing a three goal lead at home to Cardiff City in a 3–3 draw.

=== November ===
Stoke responded by winning back-to back away games 1–0 against Blackpool and Luton Town. During the international break Stoke announced that Chief Executive Tony Scholes will be leaving to club in January after 17 years in the role. Stoke suffered a major injury blow as Harry Souttar was ruled out for the remainder of the season after suffering a cruciate knee ligament injury playing for Australia. After the break Stoke beat newly promoted Peterborough United 2–0 with goals from Vrancic and Tyrese Campbell. Four days later poor finishing cost them as they fell to a 1–0 defeat at Bristol City. Stoke dropped out of the play-off places at the end of November at the expense of Blackburn Rovers who beat them 1–0, Reda Khadra scoring the only goal.

=== December ===
Stoke beat Queens Park Rangers 2–0 on 5 December in what was their first win in London since October 2014. City then played out a drab goalless draw against Middlesbrough. Stoke's matches against Coventry City and Barnsley was postponed following a COVID-19 outbreak at the club. They ended 2021 with a poor 2–1 defeat against Derby County.

=== January ===
Stoke began a busy January with a second consecutive 2–1 home defeat this time against Preston North End where goals from Brad Potts and Andrew Hughes cancelled out a 35-yard strike from Ben Wilmot. City beat Hull City 2–0 with goals from goals from Brown and Ince. A week later Stoke faced league leaders Fulham at home. They made a great start with D'Margio Wright-Phillips scoring his first league goal in the opening minute but Rodrigo Muniz levelled straight from the restart. Muniz scored again to put Fulham in front before half time before Lewis Baker equalised from long range. Fulham went on to win the game 3–2 through Bobby Decordova-Reid. Stoke lost 1–0 at Coventry on 25 January as poor defending gifted Viktor Gyökeres the only goal. They ended January with a 1–1 draw at Huddersfield Town.

Stoke were very active the January transfer window with Danny Batth, Adam Davies and Sam Surridge leaving the club permanently whilst Alfie Doughty and Tom Ince left on loan. Coming into the team were Lewis Baker, Taylor Harwood-Bellis, Phil Jagielka, Josh Maja, Liam Moore and Jaden Philogene.

=== February ===
Stoke dominated the next match against Swansea City with goals from Philogene, Baker and Brown earning the side a comfortable 3–0 victory. Stoke then played out an entertaining 2–2 draw against Nottingham Forest. Brennan Johnson gave Forest the lead before Maja scored his first league goal for the club. Brice Samba was then sent-off after conceding a penalty which was converted by Baker but Ryan Yates scored in stoppage time to deny Stoke the win. Stoke then drew 2–2 with Birmingham City and lost 2–1 to Luton and Bournemouth as they ended February in 15th position.

=== March ===
Stoke's poor form continued into March with a third straight league defeat, 1–0 against Blackpool prompting an angry reaction from supporters. The team then played away at the leagues bottom two clubs, Barnsley and Peterborough United and drew both matches and were also beaten by Cardiff City. Stoke ended their nine match winless run with a 2–0 win over Millwall on 19 March. During the international break it was announced by joint chairman John Coates that the clubs owners, bet365 Group, have converted £40m of loans into equity in the club's holding company, and waived £120m of shareholder loans.

=== April ===
An own goal from Sheffield United centre-back John Egan gave the Potters a second consecutive home victory. They then lost 2–1 at relegation-threatened Reading. Stoke then beat Midlands rivals West Bromwich Albion 3–1, with goals from Baker, Brown and an own goal from Jake Livermore. On Good Friday Stoke played Bristol City in a match of poor quality a late cross-cum-shot from Jay Dasilva looped over Jack Bonham to earn the Robins the win. On Easter Monday Stoke beat Blackburn Rovers 1–0 at Ewood Park with an early goal from Jacob Brown. They followed this up with another 1–0 win against Queens Park Rangers, Brown again scoring the only goal. The last away match of the season saw City beaten by play-off chasing Middlesbrough.

=== May ===
For the final match of the 2021–22 season against Coventry City, O'Neill gave a debut to academy prospect Tom Sparrow. Coventry took the lead in the 14th minute through Viktor Gyökeres before Sam Clucas earned Stoke a point just before half time. Stoke ended another disappointing season in 14th position, a fourth consecutive bottom half finish.

=== Results ===
| Match | Date | Opponent | Venue | Result | Attendance | Scorers | Report |
|---|---|---|---|---|---|---|---|
| 1 | 7 August 2021 | Reading | H | 3–2 | 19,068 | Powell 25', Brown 28', Surridge 85' | Report |
| 2 | 14 August 2021 | Birmingham City | A | 0–0 | 10,189 | | Report |
| 3 | 17 August 2021 | Swansea City | A | 3–1 | 15,927 | Powell 15', Clucas 53', Østigård 60' | Report |
| 4 | 21 August 2021 | Nottingham Forest | H | 1–0 | 21,346 | Tymon 66' | Report |
| 5 | 28 August 2021 | Fulham | A | 0–3 | 16,791 | | Report |
| 6 | 11 September 2021 | Huddersfield Town | H | 2–1 | 20,447 | Brown 50', Pearson 63' (o.g.) | Report |
| 7 | 15 September 2021 | Barnsley | H | 1–1 | 17,832 | Surridge 17' | Report |
| 8 | 18 September 2021 | Derby County | A | 1–2 | 20,545 | Ince 58' | Report |
| 9 | 25 September 2021 | Hull City | H | 2–0 | 20,124 | Vrančić 35', Powell 58' | Report |
| 10 | 28 September 2021 | Preston North End | A | 1–1 | 10,930 | Powell 6' | Report |
| 11 | 1 October 2021 | West Bromwich Albion | H | 1–0 | 22,703 | Powell 79' | Report |
| 12 | 16 October 2021 | Sheffield United | A | 1–2 | 28,576 | Brown 55' | Report |
| 13 | 19 October 2021 | Bournemouth | H | 0–1 | 18,427 | | Report |
| 14 | 23 October 2021 | Millwall | A | 1–2 | 12,896 | Sawyers 20' | Report |
| 15 | 30 October 2021 | Cardiff City | H | 3–3 | 21,413 | Brown 9', Fletcher (2) 16', 46' | Report |
| 16 | 3 November 2021 | Blackpool | A | 1–0 | 12,297 | Fletcher 79' | Report |
| 17 | 6 November 2021 | Luton Town | A | 1–0 | 10,068 | Brown 34' | Report |
| 18 | 20 November 2021 | Peterborough United | H | 2–0 | 21,285 | Vrančić 3', Campbell 90+6' | Report |
| 19 | 24 November 2021 | Bristol City | A | 0–1 | 16,949 | | Report |
| 20 | 27 November 2021 | Blackburn Rovers | H | 0–1 | 21,739 | | Report |
| 21 | 5 December 2021 | Queens Park Rangers | A | 2–0 | 13,968 | Campbell 14', Vrančić 78' | Report |
| 22 | 11 December 2021 | Middlesbrough | H | 0–0 | 21,140 | | Report |
| 23 | 30 December 2021 | Derby County | H | 1–2 | 22,235 | Ince 78' | Report |
| 24 | 3 January 2022 | Preston North End | H | 1–2 | 20,002 | Wilmot 46' | Report |
| 26 | 16 January 2022 | Hull City | A | 2–0 | 11,067 | Brown 22', Ince 50' | Report |
| 26 | 22 January 2022 | Fulham | H | 2–3 | 21,749 | Wright-Phillips 1', Baker 58' | Report |
| 27 | 25 January 2022 | Coventry City | A | 0–1 | 16,860 | | Report |
| 28 | 28 January 2022 | Huddersfield Town | A | 1–1 | 16,342 | Brown 78' | Report |
| 29 | 8 February 2022 | Swansea City | H | 3–0 | 17,720 | Philogene 47', Baker 58' (pen), Brown 78' | Report |
| 30 | 12 February 2022 | Nottingham Forest | A | 2–2 | 28,990 | Maja 68', Baker 88' (pen) | Report |
| 31 | 19 February 2022 | Birmingham City | H | 2–2 | 23,502 | Campbell (2) 25', 52' | Report |
| 32 | 23 February 2022 | Luton Town | H | 1–2 | 18,270 | Baker 90+2' | Report |
| 33 | 26 February 2022 | Bournemouth | A | 1–2 | 9,613 | Smith 20' | Report |
| 34 | 5 March 2022 | Blackpool | H | 0–1 | 26,384 | | Report |
| 35 | 8 March 2022 | Barnsley | A | 1–1 | 12,512 | Baker 90+5' | Report |
| 36 | 12 March 2022 | Peterborough United | A | 2–2 | 9,060 | Brown 28', Baker 84' (pen) | Report |
| 37 | 16 March 2022 | Cardiff City | A | 1–2 | 17,184 | Baker 23' | Report |
| 38 | 19 March 2022 | Millwall | H | 2–0 | 20,526 | Brown 19', Saville 70' (o.g.) | Report |
| 39 | 2 April 2022 | Sheffield United | H | 1–0 | 22,631 | Egan 77' (o.g.) | Report |
| 40 | 5 April 2022 | Reading | A | 1–2 | 9,928 | Sawyers 44' | Report |
| 41 | 9 April 2022 | West Bromwich Albion | A | 3–1 | 22,761 | Livermore 16' (o.g.), Brown 59', Baker 90+4' | Report |
| 42 | 15 April 2022 | Bristol City | H | 0–1 | 20,298 | | Report |
| 43 | 18 April 2022 | Blackburn Rovers | A | 1–0 | 13,428 | Brown 4' | Report |
| 44 | 23 April 2022 | Queens Park Rangers | H | 1–0 | 19,251 | Brown 45'+1 | Report |
| 45 | 30 April 2022 | Middlesbrough | A | 1–3 | 24,942 | Powell 90+4' | Report |
| 46 | 7 May 2022 | Coventry City | H | 1–1 | 23,086 | Clucas 43' | Report |

==== League table ====
| Pos | Team | Pld | W | D | L | GF | GA | GD | Pts |
|---|---|---|---|---|---|---|---|---|---|
| 11 | Queens Park Rangers | 46 | 19 | 9 | 18 | 60 | 59 | +1 | 66 |
| 12 | Coventry City | 46 | 17 | 13 | 16 | 60 | 59 | +1 | 64 |
| 13 | Preston North End | 46 | 16 | 16 | 14 | 52 | 56 | −4 | 64 |
| 14 | Stoke City | 46 | 17 | 11 | 18 | 57 | 52 | +5 | 62 |
| 15 | Swansea City | 46 | 16 | 13 | 17 | 58 | 68 | −10 | 61 |
| 16 | Blackpool | 46 | 16 | 12 | 18 | 54 | 58 | −4 | 60 |
| 17 | Bristol City | 46 | 15 | 10 | 21 | 62 | 77 | −15 | 55 |

Source: EFL Official Website
Rules for classification: 1) Points; 2) Goal difference; 3) Number of goals scored; 4) Head-to-head results; 5) Wins; 6) Away goals; 7) Penalty points (sec 9.5); 8) 12-point sending off offences

== FA Cup ==
Stoke were drawn at home to EFL League Two side Leyton Orient in the third round of the FA Cup and won 2–0 with goals from Tom Ince and Tyrese Campbell. League One side Wigan Athletic were the opponents in the fourth round and Stoke again won 2–0 with goals from debutant Josh Maja and Jacob Brown. Stoke were knocked out in the fifth round 2–1, away at Crystal Palace.

| Round | Date | Opponent | Venue | Result | Attendance | Scorers | Report |
|---|---|---|---|---|---|---|---|
| R3 | 9 January 2022 | Leyton Orient | H | 2–0 | 5,269 | Ince 43', Campbell 89' | Report |
| R4 | 5 February 2022 | Wigan Athletic | H | 2–0 | 12,641 | Maja 14', Brown 62' | Report |
| R5 | 1 March 2022 | Crystal Palace | A | 1–2 | 25,420 | Tymon 58' | Report |

== EFL Cup ==
Stoke were drawn at home to Fleetwood Town in the first round, and won the match 2–1 with goals from Sam Surridge and Harry Souttar. In the second round against Doncaster Rovers goals from Tom Ince and Sam Surridge helped the team to a 2–0 victory. Stoke overcame Premier League side Watford 3–1 in the third round with goals from Powell, Clucas and Tymon. In the fourth round, City were knocked out 2–1 by Brentford.

| Round | Date | Opponent | Venue | Result | Attendance | Scorers | Report |
|---|---|---|---|---|---|---|---|
| R1 | 10 August 2021 | Fleetwood Town | H | 2–1 | 4,694 | Surridge 45', Souttar 77' | Report |
| R2 | 24 August 2021 | Doncaster Rovers | H | 2–0 | 6,193 | Ince 38', Surridge 48' | Report |
| R3 | 21 September 2021 | Watford | A | 3–1 | 8,421 | Powell 25', Clucas 80', Tymon 85' | Report |
| R4 | 27 October 2021 | Brentford | H | 1–2 | 9,584 | Sawyers 57' | Report |

== Squad statistics ==
| No. | Pos. | Name | Championship | | FA Cup | | EFL Cup | | Total | | Discipline | |
| No. | Pos. | Name | Apps | Goals | Apps | Goals | Apps | Goals | Apps | Goals | Yellow card | Red card |
|---|---|---|---|---|---|---|---|---|---|---|---|---|
| 1 | GK | (Wales) Adam Davies | 12 | 0 | 0 | 0 | 3 | 0 | 15 | 0 | 3 | 0 |
| 2 | DF | (England) Tommy Smith | 30(2) | 1 | 1 | 0 | 0 | 0 | 31(2) | 1 | 6 | 1 |
| 3 | DF | (Wales) Morgan Fox | 9(1) | 0 | 1(1) | 0 | 1 | 0 | 11(2) | 0 | 1 | 1 |
| 4 | MF | (Wales) Joe Allen | 38(3) | 0 | 3 | 0 | 0 | 0 | 41(3) | 0 | 7 | 1 |
| 5 | DF | (Wales) James Chester | 16(1) | 0 | 2 | 0 | 3 | 0 | 21(1) | 0 | 1 | 0 |
| 6 | DF | (England) Danny Batth | 10(1) | 0 | 0 | 0 | 2 | 0 | 12(1) | 0 | 4 | 0 |
| 6 | DF | (Jamaica) Liam Moore | 4 | 0 | 2 | 0 | 0 | 0 | 6 | 0 | 0 | 0 |
| 7 | MF | (England) Sam Clucas | 16(9) | 2 | 1(1) | 0 | 1(1) | 1 | 18(11) | 3 | 6 | 0 |
| 8 | MF | (Bosnia and Herzegovina) Mario Vrančić | 24(6) | 3 | 0(2) | 0 | 0(3) | 0 | 24(11) | 3 | 3 | 0 |
| 9 | FW | (Scotland) Steven Fletcher | 16(19) | 3 | 0(2) | 0 | 1(2) | 0 | 17(23) | 3 | 2 | 0 |
| 10 | FW | (England) Tyrese Campbell | 10(16) | 4 | 1(2) | 1 | 1 | 0 | 12(18) | 5 | 2 | 0 |
| 11 | MF | (England) Alfie Doughty | 0(11) | 0 | 1 | 0 | 4 | 0 | 5(11) | 0 | 2 | 0 |
| 12 | GK | (England) Josef Bursik | 19 | 0 | 1 | 0 | 1 | 0 | 21 | 0 | 1 | 0 |
| 13 | GK | (Republic of Ireland) Jack Bonham | 15 | 0 | 2 | 0 | 0 | 0 | 17 | 0 | 0 | 0 |
| 14 | DF | (England) Josh Tymon | 44 | 1 | 2(1) | 1 | 2 | 1 | 48(1) | 3 | 7 | 0 |
| 15 | MF | (Northern Ireland) Jordan Thompson | 12(6) | 0 | 2 | 0 | 4 | 0 | 18(6) | 0 | 5 | 0 |
| 16 | DF | (England) Ben Wilmot | 31(4) | 1 | 1 | 0 | 2 | 0 | 35(4) | 1 | 11 | 0 |
| 18 | FW | (Scotland) Jacob Brown | 38(7) | 13 | 1(2) | 1 | 2(2) | 0 | 41(11) | 14 | 7 | 0 |
| 19 | DF | (Norway) Leo Østigård | 12(1) | 1 | 0 | 0 | 2 | 0 | 14(1) | 1 | 5 | 0 |
| 19 | DF | (England) Phil Jagielka | 20 | 0 | 0 | 0 | 0 | 0 | 20 | 0 | 1 | 0 |
| 20 | MF | (England) Tashan Oakley-Boothe | 0 | 0 | 0 | 0 | 0 | 0 | 0 | 0 | 0 | 0 |
| 21 | DF | (England) Demeaco Duhaney | 3 | 0 | 1 | 0 | 2 | 0 | 6 | 0 | 1 | 0 |
| 22 | FW | (England) Sam Surridge | 6(14) | 2 | 0 | 0 | 3(1) | 2 | 9(15) | 4 | 4 | 1 |
| 23 | MF | (England) Tom Ince | 4(7) | 3 | 1 | 1 | 2(1) | 1 | 7(8) | 5 | 2 | 0 |
| 24 | DF | (England) Taylor Harwood-Bellis | 22 | 0 | 2 | 0 | 0 | 0 | 24 | 0 | 3 | 0 |
| 25 | MF | (England) Nick Powell | 14(4) | 6 | 2 | 0 | 1 | 1 | 17(4) | 7 | 2 | 0 |
| 26 | DF | (England) Will Forrester | 3 | 0 | 0 | 0 | 0 | 0 | 3 | 0 | 0 | 0 |
| 27 | FW | (Senegal) Abdallah Sima | 1(1) | 0 | 0 | 0 | 0(2) | 0 | 1(3) | 0 | 0 | 0 |
| 28 | MF | (Saint Kitts and Nevis) Romaine Sawyers | 19(6) | 2 | 1 | 0 | 2(1) | 1 | 22(7) | 3 | 2 | 0 |
| 29 | GK | (England) Frank Fielding | 0 | 0 | 0 | 0 | 0 | 0 | 0 | 0 | 0 | 0 |
| 32 | MF | (England) D'Margio Wright-Phillips | 6(4) | 1 | 2 | 0 | 0 | 0 | 8(4) | 1 | 0 | 0 |
| 33 | FW | (Nigeria) Josh Maja | 9(6) | 1 | 2 | 1 | 0 | 0 | 11(6) | 2 | 1 | 0 |
| 36 | DF | (Australia) Harry Souttar | 16 | 0 | 0 | 0 | 2 | 1 | 18 | 1 | 3 | 0 |
| 37 | FW | (England) Emre Tezgel | 0 | 0 | 0(2) | 0 | 0 | 0 | 0(2) | 0 | 0 | 0 |
| 38 | MF | (England) Adam Porter | 0 | 0 | 0 | 0 | 2 | 0 | 2 | 0 | 0 | 0 |
| 39 | MF | (Wales) Tom Sparrow | 1 | 0 | 0 | 0 | 0 | 0 | 1 | 0 | 0 | 0 |
| 42 | MF | (England) Lewis Baker | 20(1) | 8 | 0 | 0 | 0 | 0 | 20(1) | 8 | 1 | 0 |
| 44 | FW | (Wales) Christian Norton | 0 | 0 | 0 | 0 | 1(1) | 0 | 1(1) | 0 | 0 | 0 |
| 47 | FW | (England) Jaden Philogene | 6(5) | 1 | 0 | 0 | 0 | 0 | 6(5) | 1 | 0 | 0 |
| Own goals | | | — | 4 | — | 0 | — | 0 | — | 4 | — | |

== Transfers ==
=== In ===
| Date | Pos. | Name | From | Fee | Ref. |
|---|---|---|---|---|---|
| 24 June 2021 | DF | (England) Ben Wilmot | (England) Watford | Undisclosed | |
| 28 June 2021 | DF | (Wales) Matt Baker | (England) Gillingham | Undisclosed | |
| 29 June 2021 | DF | (Northern Ireland) Josh Roney | (Northern Ireland) Linfield | Undisclosed | |
| 1 July 2021 | GK | (Republic of Ireland) Jack Bonham | (England) Gillingham | Free | |
| 5 July 2021 | MF | (Bosnia and Herzegovina) Mario Vrančić | (England) Norwich City | Free | |
| 16 July 2021 | DF | (Scotland) Logan Laird | (England) Exeter City | Free | |
| 4 August 2021 | FW | (England) Sam Surridge | (England) AFC Bournemouth | Undisclosed | |
| 31 August 2021 | DF | (England) Demeaco Duhaney | (England) Huddersfield Town | Free | |
| 1 September 2021 | FW | (England) Max McCarthy | (England) Congleton Town | Undisclosed | |
| 1 December 2021 | GK | (England) Frank Fielding | (England) Millwall | Free | |
| 15 January 2022 | MF | (England) Lewis Baker | (England) Chelsea | Undisclosed | |
| 16 January 2022 | DF | (England) Phil Jagielka | (England) Derby County | Free | |

=== Out ===
| Date | Pos. | Name | To | Fee | Ref. |
|---|---|---|---|---|---|
| 28 May 2021 | DF | (Austria) Kevin Wimmer | (Austria) SK Rapid Wien | Free | |
| 9 June 2021 | DF | (Scotland) Liam Lindsay | (England) Preston North End | Undisclosed | |
| 23 June 2021 | MF | (England) Ryan Woods | (England) Birmingham City | Free | |
| 24 June 2021 | DF | (Republic of Ireland) Nathan Collins | (England) Burnley | Undisclosed | |
| 30 June 2021 | GK | (England) Paul Cooper | (England) Matlock Town | Released | |
| 30 June 2021 | DF | (Republic of Ireland) Ryan Corrigan | (England) Southport | Released | |
| 30 June 2021 | DF | (England) Jordan Cousins | (England) Wigan Athletic | Released | |
| 30 June 2021 | FW | (England) Kevin Fernandes | — | Released | |
| 30 June 2021 | FW | (Belgium) Andre Godfrinne | — | Rejected contract | |
| 30 June 2021 | DF | (England) Jamie Melbourne | — | Released | |
| 30 June 2021 | DF | (Wales) Henry Nash | (England) York City | Released | |
| 30 June 2021 | DF | (England) Julius Ndene | — | Released | |
| 30 June 2021 | DF | (England) Tom Nixon | (England) Hull City | Released | |
| 30 June 2021 | FW | (England) Jai Verma | — | Released | |
| 1 July 2021 | DF | (Austria) Moritz Bauer | (Russia) FC Ufa | Undisclosed | |
| 1 July 2021 | MF | (Nigeria) John Obi Mikel | Kuwait SC | Free | |
| 5 July 2021 | DF | (Netherlands) Bruno Martins Indi | (Netherlands) AZ Alkmaar | Undisclosed | |
| 22 July 2021 | MF | (Senegal) Badou Ndiaye | (Greece) Aris Thessaloniki | Free | |
| 23 July 2021 | MF | (Denmark) Lasse Sørensen | (England) Lincoln City | Undisclosed | |
| 28 July 2021 | FW | (Wales) Sam Vokes | (England) Wycombe Wanderers | Undisclosed | |
| 5 August 2021 | FW | (England) Lee Gregory | (England) Sheffield Wednesday | Undisclosed | |
| 17 August 2021 | MF | (Republic of Ireland) James McClean | (England) Wigan Athletic | Free | |
| 18 January 2022 | DF | (England) Danny Batth | (England) Sunderland | Free | |
| 25 January 2022 | GK | (Wales) Adam Davies | (England) Sheffield United | Undisclosed | |
| 31 January 2022 | GK | (England) Nathan Broome | (England) AFC Wimbledon | Free | |
| 31 January 2022 | FW | (England) Sam Surridge | (England) Nottingham Forest | Undisclosed | |

=== Loans in ===
| Date from | Pos. | Name | From | Date to | Ref. |
|---|---|---|---|---|---|
| 10 August 2021 | DF | (Norway) Leo Østigård | (England) Brighton & Hove Albion | 5 January 2022 | (Note: On 5 January 2022, Leo Østigård was recalled to parent club Brighton.) |
| 20 August 2021 | MF | (Saint Kitts and Nevis) Romaine Sawyers | (England) West Bromwich Albion | End of season | |
| 31 August 2021 | FW | (Senegal) Abdallah Sima | (England) Brighton & Hove Albion | End of season | |
| 11 January 2022 | DF | (England) Taylor Harwood-Bellis | (England) Manchester City | End of season | |
| 21 January 2022 | FW | (England) Jaden Philogene | (England) Aston Villa | End of season | |
| 31 January 2022 | FW | (Nigeria) Josh Maja | (France) Bordeaux | End of season | |
| 31 January 2022 | DF | (Jamaica) Liam Moore | (England) Reading | End of season | |

=== Loans out ===
| Date from | Pos. | Name | To | Date to | Ref. |
|---|---|---|---|---|---|
| 17 June 2021 | DF | (England) Connor Taylor | (England) Bristol Rovers | End of season | |
| 2 July 2021 | FW | (Democratic Republic of the Congo) Benik Afobe | (England) Millwall | End of season | |
| 9 July 2021 | MF | (Nigeria) Peter Etebo | (England) Watford | End of season | |
| 16 July 2021 | GK | (Cameroon) Blondy Nna Noukeu | (England) Crawley Town | 1 January 2022 | |
| 20 July 2021 | FW | (Republic of Ireland) Ethon Varian | (Scotland) Raith Rovers | 1 January 2022 | |
| 11 August 2021 | FW | (England) Will Goodwin | (England) Hartlepool United | 1 January 2022 | |
| 31 August 2021 | FW | (Wales) Christian Norton | (England) Cheltenham Town | January 2022 | |
| 31 August 2021 | DF | (England) Will Forrester | (England) Mansfield Town | January 2022 | |
| 31 August 2021 | DF | (Wales) Eddy Jones | (England) Hartlepool United | January 2022 | |
| 15 October 2021 | MF | (Wales) Tom Sparrow | (England) AFC Telford United | November 2021 | |
| 5 November 2021 | MF | (England) Adam Porter | (England) Altrincham | 3 December 2021 | |
| 29 January 2022 | MF | (England) Alfie Doughty | (Wales) Cardiff City | End of season | |
| 31 January 2022 | MF | (England) Tom Ince | (England) Reading | End of season | |
| 1 February 2022 | DF | (Republic of Ireland) David Okagbue | (England) Chester | March 2021 | |
| 4 February 2022 | DF | (Wales) Eddy Jones | (England) Altrincham | End of season | |
| 5 February 2022 | MF | (England) Pat Jarrett | (England) AFC Telford United | End of season | |
| 8 February 2022 | DF | (Scotland) Lewis Macari | (Republic of Ireland) Dundalk | End of season | |
| 17 February 2022 | DF | (England) Tom Edwards | (United States) New York Red Bulls | End of season | |
| 24 February 2022 | DF | (England) Kieran Coates | (Republic of Ireland) Cork City | End of season | |
| 24 March 2022 | FW | (England) Douglas James-Taylor | (England) AFC Fylde | End of season | |
| 25 March 2022 | GK | (England) Frank Fielding | (England) Salford City | 1 April 2022 | |
