= Adam Porter =

English professional footballer

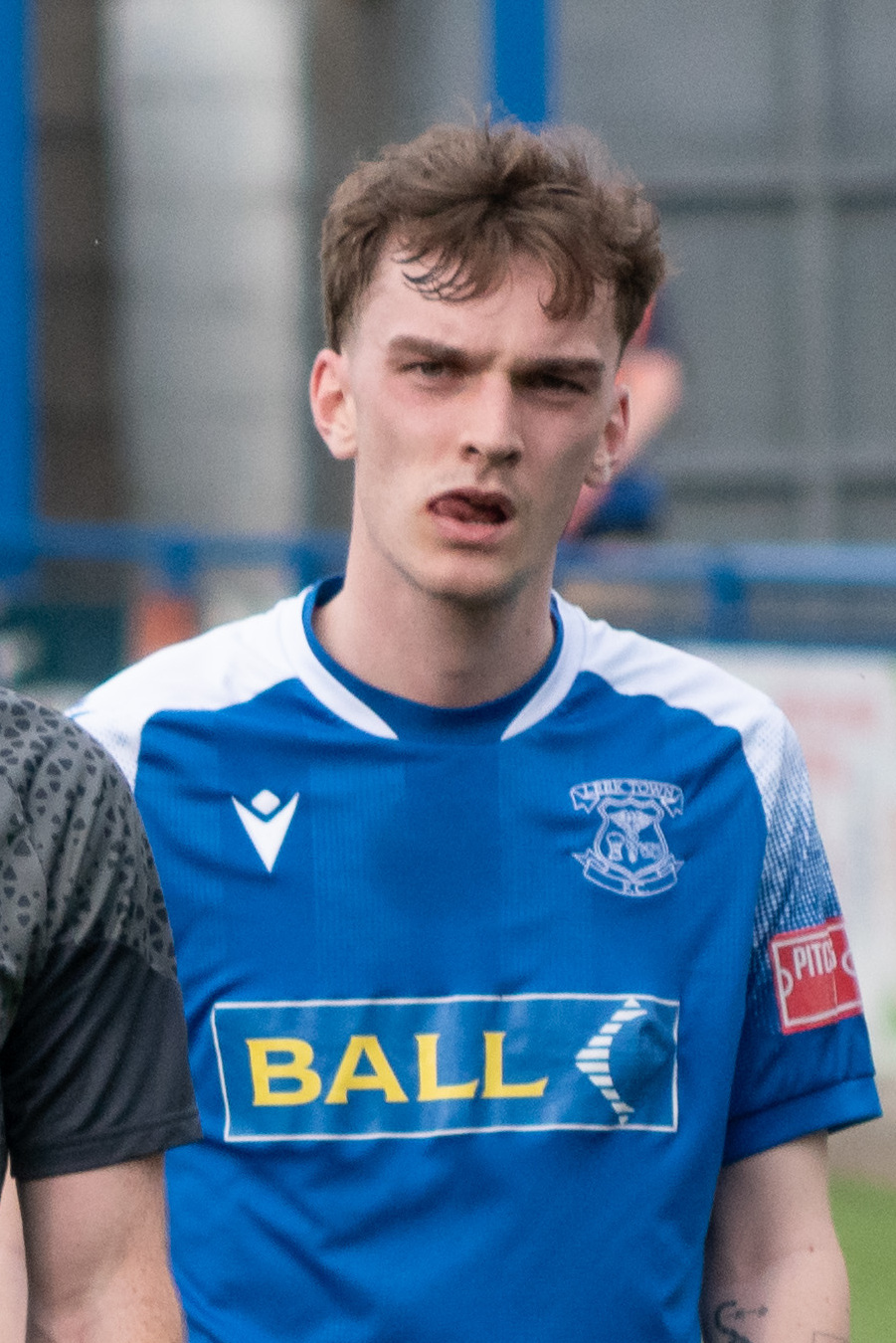
- Porter playing for Leek Town in 2025

Personal information
- Full name: Adam Matthew Porter
- Date of birth: 8 April 2002 (age 24)
- Place of birth: Biddulph, England
- Position: Midfielder

Team information
- Current team: Leek Town

Youth career
- 2009–2021: Stoke City

Senior career*
| Years | Team | Apps | (Gls) |
| 2021–2022 | Stoke City | 0 | (0) |
| 2019 | → Leek Town (loan) | 1 | (0) |
| 2021–2022 | → Altrincham (loan) | 8 | (0) |
| 2022–2023 | Salford City | 0 | (0) |
| 2022–2023 | → Truro City (loan) | 16 | (3) |
| 2023–2024 | Truro City | 40 | (7) |
| 2024– | Leek Town | 29 | (2) |
- * Club domestic league appearances and goals as of 16:09, 17 April 2025 (UTC)

Adam Matthew Porter (born 8 April 2002) is an English professional footballer who plays as a midfielder for Leek Town.

== Career ==
Porter was born in Biddulph and joined the Stoke City Academy from a young age. He progressed through the youth teams and was made captain of the under-18 side by Kevin Russell. In October 2019, he joined Northern Premier League side Leek Town on loan, where he made three appearances in all competitions. He began to travel with the first team towards the end of the 2019–20 season and was named on the bench against Nottingham Forest. Porter made his professional debut on 10 August 2021 in a EFL Cup match against Fleetwood Town. On 5 November 2021 Porter joined National League side Altrincham on a four-week youth loan. Porter made ten appearances for the Robins before returning to Stoke. Porter was released by Stoke at the end of the 2021–22 season, having spent 14 years at the club.

Following his release from Stoke City, Porter signed for EFL League Two club Salford City. On 21 October 2022, Porter joined Southern Football League Premier Division South club Truro City on loan, where he remained until February 2023. On the expiry of his contract with Salford City, Porter returned to Truro on a permanent basis ahead of the 2023–24 season, and went on to make 40 appearances for the club in the National League South, scoring 7 goals. In August 2024, he joined another previous loan club, Leek Town, recently promoted to the Northern Premier League Premier Division.

== Career statistics ==
As of match played 12 April 2025

Appearances and goals by club, season and competition
| Club | Season | League | | | FA Cup | | League Cup | | Other | | Total | |
| Club | Season | Division | Apps | Goals | Apps | Goals | Apps | Goals | Apps | Goals | Apps | Goals |
|---|---|---|---|---|---|---|---|---|---|---|---|---|
| Stoke City | 2021–22 | EFL Championship | 0 | 0 | 0 | 0 | 2 | 0 | — | | 2 | 0 |
| Leek Town (loan) | 2019–20 | NPL Division One South East | 1 | 0 | 0 | 0 | — | | 2 (Note: Appearances in FA Trophy) | 0 | 3 | 0 |
| Altrincham (loan) | 2021–22 | National League | 8 | 0 | 2 | 0 | — | | 1 | 0 | 11 | 0 |
| Salford City | 2022–23 | EFL League Two | 0 | 0 | 0 | 0 | 0 | 0 | 1 (Note: Appearances in EFL Trophy) | 0 | 1 | 0 |
| Truro City (loan) | 2022–23 | Southern League Premier South | 16 | 3 | 0 | 0 | — | | 0 | 0 | 16 | 3 |
| Truro City | 2023–24 | National League South | 40 | 7 | 0 | 0 | — | | 1 | 0 | 41 | 7 |
| Leek Town | 2024–25 | NPL Division One West | 29 | 2 | 2 | 0 | — | | 4 (Note: Appearances in Staffordshire Senior Cup) | 0 | 35 | 2 |
| Career total | | | 94 | 12 | 4 | 0 | 2 | 0 | 9 | 0 | 109 | 12 |
