= Adrian Liber =

Croatian footballer

Personal information
- Date of birth: 9 January 2001 (age 25)
- Place of birth: Zabok, Croatia
- Height: 1.71 m (5 ft 7 in)
- Position: Midfielder

Team information
- Current team: Odra Opole
- Number: 16

Youth career
- 2010–2015: Kaštelir-Labinci
- 2015–2019: Rijeka

Senior career*
Years	Team	Apps	(Gls)
2019–2023	Rijeka	39	(2)
2019–2020	→ Orijent 1919 (loan)	34	(1)
2023–2026	Slaven Belupo	69	(3)
2026–	Odra Opole	10	(0)

International career
2018	Croatia U17	1	(0)
2018	Croatia U18	3	(0)
2018–2020	Croatia U19	15	(0)
2018	Croatia U20	2	(0)
2021	Croatia U21	2	(0)
- * Club domestic league appearances and goals as of 08:37, 27 May 2026 (UTC)

Adrian Liber (born 9 January 2001) is a Croatian professional footballer who plays as a midfielder for I liga club Odra Opole.

== Career statistics ==
As of match played 26 April 2026

Appearances and goals by club, season and competition
Club	Season	League			National cup (Note: Includes Croatian Cup)		Continental		Other		Total	
Club	Season	Division	Apps	Goals	Apps	Goals	Apps	Goals	Apps	Goals	Apps	Goals
Rijeka	2018–19	1. HNL	1	0	0	0	—		—		1	0
Rijeka	2020–21	1. HNL	6	0	1	0	—		—		7	0
Rijeka	2021–22	1. HNL	10	0	2	0	5 (Note: Appearance(s) in UEFA Europa Conference League)	0	—		17	0
Rijeka	2022–23	Croatian Football League	20	2	0	0	1	0	—		21	2
Rijeka	2023–24	Croatian Football League	2	0	0	0	4	0	—		6	0
Rijeka	Total		39	2	3	0	10	0	—		52	2
Orijent 1919 (loan)	2019–20	2. HNL	18	0	0	0	—		2 (Note: Appearances in Croatian First Football League promotion/relegation play-offs)	0	20	0
Orijent 1919 (loan)	2020–21	2. HNL	16	1	0	0	—		0	0	16	1
Orijent 1919 (loan)	Total		34	1	0	0	—		2	0	36	1
Slaven Belupo	2023–24	Croatian Football League	26	0	0	0	—		—		26	0
Slaven Belupo	2024–25	Croatian Football League	28	2	4	0	—		—		32	2
Slaven Belupo	2025–26	Croatian Football League	15	1	1	0	—		—		16	1
Slaven Belupo	Total		69	3	5	0	—		—		74	3
Odra Opole	2025–26	I liga	10	0	—		—		—		10	0
Career total			152	6	8	0	10	0	2	0	172	6
