= Gabriel Lunetta =

Italian footballer (born 1996)

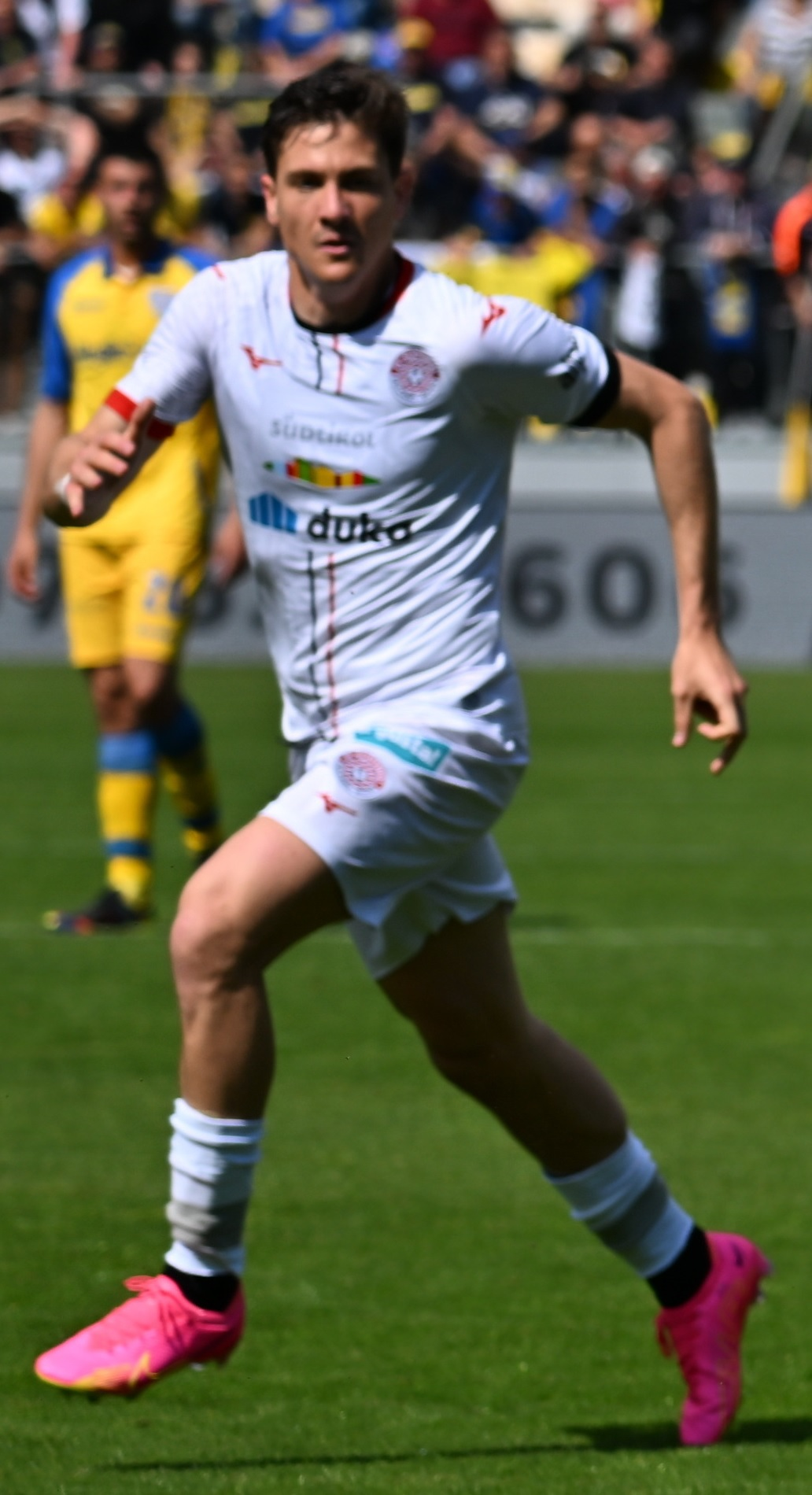
- Lunetta in 2023

Personal information
- Full name: Gabriel Antonio Lunetta
- Date of birth: 10 August 1996 (age 30)
- Place of birth: Milan, Italy
- Height: 1.86 m (6 ft 1 in)
- Position: Left winger

Team information
- Current team: Catania
- Number: 23

Youth career
- –2016: Atalanta Primavera

Senior career*
Years	Team	Apps	(Gls)
2016–2022	Atalanta	0	(0)
2016–2017	→ Gubbio (loan)	2	(0)
2017–2018	→ Renate (loan)	28	(4)
2018–2019	→ Giana Erminio (loan)	19	(1)
2019	→ Südtirol (loan)	13	(4)
2019–2021	→ Reggiana (loan)	43	(2)
2021–2022	→ Alessandria (loan)	33	(3)
2022–2023	Rijeka	7	(1)
2023	→ Südtirol (loan)	14	(0)
2023–2024	Südtirol	13	(0)
2024	Lecco	10	(0)
2024–	Catania	60	(15)
- * Club domestic league appearances and goals as of 1 May 2026

Gabriel Antonio Lunetta (born 10 August 1996) is an Italian professional footballer who plays as a left-winger for Serie C Group C club Catania.

== Club career ==
=== Atalanta ===
==== Loan to Gubbio ====
On 14 July 2016, Lunetta was loaned to Serie C club Gubbio on a season-long loan deal. On 13 September he made his professional debut in Serie C for Gubbio in a 3–1 home defeat against Sambenedettese, he was replaced by Leonardo Candellone in the 46th minute. On 30 April 2017 he played his second match for the club as a substitute replacing Daniele Casiraghi in the 82nd minute of a 3–0 away defeat against Bassano Virtus. On 13 May he made his third appearance, again as a substitute, replacing Massimo Conti in the 68th minute of a 3–2 home win over Sambenedettese in the first round of play-off. Lunetta ended his season-long loan to Gubbio with only this 3 appearances.

==== Loan to Renate ====
On 11 July 2017, Lunetta was signed by Serie C side Renate on a season-long loan deal. On 30 July, Lunetta made his debut for Renate in a 3–1 home win over Siracusa in the first round of Coppa Italia, he scored his first goal in the 57th minute and he was replaced by Guido Gòmez in the 64th minute. On 27 August, Lunetta made his Serie C debut for Renate in a 3–0 home win over Padova, he was replaced by Francesco Finocchio in the 71st minute. On 16 September, Lunetta scored his first goal in Serie C in the third minute of a 3–0 away win over Modena. On 24 September he played his first entire match for Renate, a 1–0 home win over Reggiana. On 8 November he scored his second goal in the 12th minute of a 1–1 away draw against Vicenza. Lunetta ended his loan to Renate with 31 appearances, 5 goals and 7 assists.

==== Loan to Giana Erminio and Südtirol ====
On 23 August 2018, Lunetta was loaned to Serie C club Giana Erminio on a season-long loan deal. On 16 September he made his debut for Giana Erminio in Serie C as a substitute replacing Daniele Rocco in the 60th minute of a 0–0 away draw against Vicenza Virtus. One week later, on 23 September, he played his first match as a starter in a 2–1 home defeat against Imolese, he was replaced by Mbia Seck in the 46th minute. On 7 October he scored his first goal for Giana Erminio in the 20th minute of a 2–2 home draw against Rimini. On 1 December he played his first entire match for the team, a 4–2 home defeat against FeralpiSalò. In January 2019 his loan was interrupted and he left Giana Erminio with 19 appearances, 1 goal and 2 assists.

On 29 January 2019, Lunetta was signed by Südtirol on a 6-month loan deal. On 2 February he made his debut as a substitute replacing Alessandro Fabbri in the 90th minute of a 4–2 away win over AlbinoLeffe. One week later, on 9 February, he played his first entire match for the team, a 2–0 home win over Fermana. One more week later, on 16 February he scored twice in a 4–0 home win over Gubbio. Lunetta ended his 6-month loan to Südtirol with 15 appearances, 4 goals and 1 assist.

==== Loan to Reggio Audace ====
On 14 August 2019, Lunetta was loaned to newly promoted Serie C side Reggio Audace on a season-long loan deal. Ten days later, on 24 August, he made his debut for the club in Serie C as a substitute replacing Mattia Marchi in the 85th minute and he scored his first goal in the 93rd minute of a 4–1 home win over FeralpiSalò. Eight days later, on 1 September, he scored his second goal, again as a substitute, in the 81st minute of a 2–1 away win over Ravenna. On 15 September, Lunetta played his first match as a starter for the club, a 3–0 away win over Südtirol, he was replaced by Riccardo Martinelli in the 72nd minute. Lunetta ended his season-long loan with 17 appearances, 2 goals and 2 assist and he also helped the club to reach the promotion in Serie B.

On 31 August 2020 his loan was extended for another season.

==== Loan to Alessandria ====
On 16 July 2021, he joined Alessandria on a season-long loan.

=== Rijeka ===
On 31 August 2022, Lunetta signed with Rijeka in Croatia.

=== Return to Südtirol ===
On 12 January 2023, Lunetta returned to Südtirol on loan until the end of the season. Südtirol held an obligation to purchase his rights permanently if the club avoided relegation from Serie B, which they did, making the transfer permanent.

=== Lecco ===
On 1 February 2024, Lunetta moved to Lecco.

=== Catania ===
On 29 August 2024, Lunetta signed a three-year contract with Catania.

== Career statistics ==
=== Club ===
As of 10 August 2020

Club	Season	League			Cup		Europe		Other		Total	
Club	Season	League	Apps	Goals	Apps	Goals	Apps	Goals	Apps	Goals	Apps	Goals
Gubbio (loan)	2016–17	Serie C	2	0	0	0	—		1 (Note: Appearance(s) in Serie C play-off.)	0	3	0
Renate (loan)	2017–18	Serie C	28	4	3	1	—		—		31	5
Giana Erminio (loan)	2018–19	Serie C	19	1	0	0	—		—		19	1
Südtirol (loan)	2018–19	Serie C	13	4	—		—		2	0	15	4
Reggio Audace (loan)	2019–20	Serie C	14	2	0	0	—		3	0	17	2
Career total			76	11	3	1	—		6	0	85	12
