= Pablo Álvarez (footballer, born 1997) =

Spanish footballer

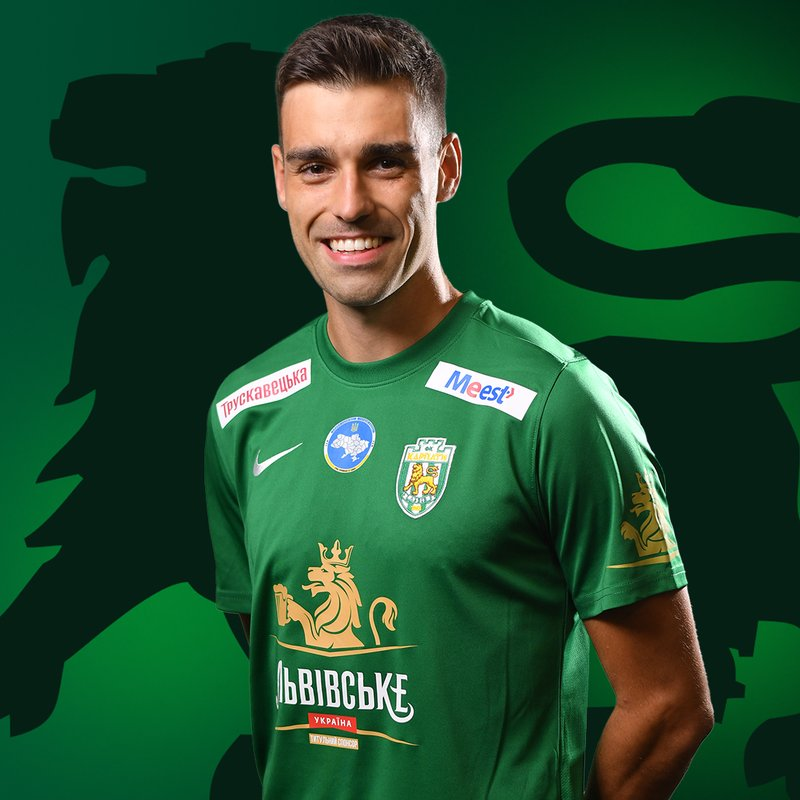

Personal information
- Full name: Pablo Álvarez García
- Date of birth: 23 April 1997 (age 29)
- Place of birth: Langreo, Spain
- Height: 1.85 m (6 ft 1 in)
- Position: Midfielder

Team information
- Current team: Aktobe
- Number: 21

Youth career
- 2013–2016: Villarreal

Senior career*
Years	Team	Apps	(Gls)
2016–2017	Villarreal C	35	(4)
2018–2020	Alavés B	21	(1)
2018–2019	→ San Ignacio (loan)	18	(6)
2021–2022	Cherno More	42	(8)
2022–2023	Rijeka	8	(0)
2023–2024	Cherno More	30	(3)
2024–2025	Karpaty Lviv	39	(2)
2026–	Aktobe	24	(1)
- * Club domestic league appearances and goals as of 1 November 2026

Pablo Álvarez García (born 23 April 1997) is a Spanish professional footballer who plays as a midfielder for Kazakhstani club Aktobe.

== Career ==
Pablo Álvarez is a footballer trained in the lower categories Real Sporting de Gijón In 2013, Álvarez joined the youth academy of Spanish La Liga side Villarreal.

Before the second half of the 2017–18 season, he signed for the reserves of Alavés in the Spanish La Liga.

In 2018, Álvarez was sent on loan to Spanish fourth division club San Ignacio, where he suffered injuries.

Before the second half of the 2020–21 season, he signed for Cherno More in the Bulgarian top flight. In May 2022 Álvarez left the team after the expiration of his contract.

After a season-long spell with Croatian side Rijeka, Pablo Álvarez became the first summer signing of his former club Cherno More.

On 14 June 2024, Álvarez signed a contract with Ukrainian club Karpaty Lviv.

== Honours ==
Individual

- Bulgarian First League Goal of the Week: 2021–22 (Week 15) v. Botev Plovdiv
