= 2022–23 Croatian Football League =

SuperSport Hrvatska nogometna liga
- Season: 2022–23
- Dates: 15 July 2022 – 28 May 2023
- Champions: Dinamo Zagreb
- Relegated: Šibenik
- Champions League: Dinamo Zagreb
- Europa Conference League: Hajduk Split; Osijek; Rijeka
- Matches: 180
- Goals: 445 (2.47 per match)
- Top goalscorer: Marko Livaja (19 goals)
- Biggest home win: Hajduk Split 5–1 Slaven Belupo (4 September 2022); Dinamo Zagreb 4–0 Hajduk Split (26 February 2023)
- Biggest away win: Rijeka 2–7 Dinamo Zagreb (13 November 2022)
- Highest scoring: Rijeka 2–7 Dinamo Zagreb (13 November 2022); Gorica 5–4 Istra 1961 (10 March 2023)
- Longest winning run: 8 matches Dinamo Zagreb
- Longest unbeaten run: 13 matches Dinamo Zagreb; Hajduk Split
- Longest winless run: 18 matches Gorica
- Longest losing run: 5 matches Šibenik; Gorica
- Total attendance: 735,219
- Average attendance: 4,085

The 2022–23 Croatian Football League (also known as HNL; officially styled SuperSport Hrvatska nogometna liga for sponsorship reasons) was the 32nd season of the Croatian top division football, the national championship for men's association football teams in Croatia, since its establishment in 1992. The season began on 15 July 2022. Due to the 2022 FIFA World Cup, the last round before the winter break was held on 12–13 November. The league resumed on 21 January and concluded on 28 May 2023.

== Teams ==
The following teams competed in the 2022–23 HNL.

=== Changes ===
Varaždin (promoted after a one-year absence) was promoted from the 2021–22 Druga HNL. Hrvatski Dragovoljac (relegated after single season in the top flight) was relegated to 2022–23 Prva NL.

=== Stadia and locations ===
Dinamo Zagreb	Gorica	Hajduk Split	Istra 1961
Stadion Maksimir	Gradski stadion Velika Gorica	Stadion Poljud	Stadion Aldo Drosina
Capacity: 24,851	Capacity: 4,536	Capacity: 33,987	Capacity: 9,921
Lokomotiva	Locations of teams in 2022–23 HNL		Osijek
Stadion Kranjčevićeva	Locations of teams in 2022–23 HNL		Stadion Gradski vrt
Capacity: 3,690	Locations of teams in 2022–23 HNL		Capacity: 18,856
Rijeka	Slaven Belupo	Šibenik	Varaždin
Stadion Rujevica	Stadion Ivan Kušek-Apaš	Stadion Šubićevac	Stadion Varteks
Capacity: 8,191	Capacity: 3,054	Capacity: 3,701	Capacity: 8,818

Team	City	Stadium	Capacity	Ref.
Dinamo Zagreb	Zagreb	Maksimir	24,851	
Gorica	Velika Gorica	ŠRC Velika Gorica	4,536	
Hajduk Split	Split	Poljud	33,987	
Istra 1961	Pula	Stadion Aldo Drosina	9,921	
Lokomotiva	Zagreb	Kranjčevićeva^{1}	3,690	
Osijek	Osijek	Gradski vrt	18,856	
Rijeka	Rijeka	Rujevica	8,191	
Slaven Belupo	Koprivnica	Stadion Ivan Kušek-Apaš	3,054	
Šibenik	Šibenik	Šubićevac	3,701	
Varaždin	Varaždin	Stadion Varteks	8,818	

- ^{1} Lokomotiva host their home matches at Stadion Kranjčevićeva. The stadium is originally the home ground of fifth-level side NK Zagreb.

Rank	Counties of Croatia	Number of teams	Club(s)
1	City of Zagreb	2	Dinamo Zagreb, Lokomotiva
2	Istria	1	Istra 1961
2	Koprivnica-Križevci	1	Slaven Belupo
2	Osijek-Baranja	1	Osijek
2	Primorje-Gorski Kotar	1	Rijeka
2	Split-Dalmatia	1	Hajduk Split
2	Šibenik-Knin	1	Šibenik
2	Varaždin	1	Varaždin
2	Zagreb County	1	Gorica

=== Personnel and kits ===
Club	Manager	Captain	Kit manufacturer	Sponsors
Dinamo Zagreb	(Croatia) Igor Bišćan	(Croatia) Dominik Livaković	Adidas	PSK
Gorica	(Croatia) Željko Sopić	(Bosnia and Herzegovina) Aleksandar Jovičić	Alpas	Admiral Bet
Hajduk Split	(Croatia) Ivan Leko	(Croatia) Lovre Kalinić	Macron	Tommy
Istra 1961	(Spain) Gonzalo García	(Croatia) Slavko Blagojević	Kelme	Germania
Lokomotiva	(Croatia) Silvijo Čabraja	(Croatia) Josip Pivarić	Macron	—
Osijek	(Croatia) Stjepan Tomas	(Croatia) Mihael Žaper	2Rule	Mészáros és Mészáros Kft.
Rijeka	(Bosnia and Herzegovina) Sergej Jakirović	(Croatia) Nediljko Labrović	Joma	Sava Osiguranje
Slaven Belupo	(Croatia) Zoran Zekić	(Croatia) Tomislav Božić	Jako	Belupo
Šibenik	(Austria) Damir Canadi	(Croatia) Mario Ćurić	Macron	Favbet
Varaždin	(Croatia) Mario Kovačević	(Croatia) Igor Postonjski	Legea	BURA VENTURES

=== Managerial changes ===
Team	Outgoing manager	Manner of departure	Date of vacancy	Replaced by	Date of appointment	Position in table
Šibenik	(Croatia) Dean Računica	Resigned	21 May 2022	(Austria) Damir Canadi	7 June 2022	Pre-season
Rijeka	(Croatia) Goran Tomić	Mutual consent	28 May 2022	(Croatia) Dragan Tadić	20 June 2022	Pre-season
Rijeka	(Croatia) Dragan Tadić	Mutual consent	16 August 2022	(Croatia) Fausto Budicin (caretaker)	16 August 2022	9th
Gorica	(Croatia) Samir Toplak	Sacked	26 August 2022	(North Macedonia) Igor Angelovski	27 August 2022	9th
Osijek	(Croatia) Nenad Bjelica	Sacked	29 August 2022	(Austria) René Poms	1 September 2022	5th
Rijeka	(Croatia) Fausto Budicin (caretaker)	End of Caretaker spell	5 September 2022	(Italy) Serse Cosmi	5 September 2022	10th
Hajduk Split	(Lithuania) Valdas Dambrauskas	Mutual consent	12 September 2022	(Bosnia and Herzegovina) Mislav Karoglan	12 September 2022	4th
Šibenik	(Austria) Damir Canadi	Mutual consent	24 September 2022	(Croatia) Mario Cvitanović	25 September 2022	7th
Rijeka	(Italy) Serse Cosmi	Mutual consent	13 November 2022	(Bosnia and Herzegovina) Sergej Jakirović	25 November 2022	8th
Gorica	(North Macedonia) Igor Angelovski	Mutual consent	13 November 2022	(Croatia) Željko Sopić	28 November 2022	10th
Hajduk Split	(Bosnia and Herzegovina) Mislav Karoglan	Removed from position	31 December 2022	(Croatia) Ivan Leko	31 December 2022	2nd
Šibenik	(Croatia) Mario Cvitanović	Sacked	31 January 2023	(Austria) Damir Canadi	31 January 2023	9th
Osijek	(Austria) René Poms	Sacked	2 March 2023	(Croatia) Borimir Perković	2 March 2023	3rd
Dinamo Zagreb	(Croatia) Ante Čačić	Sacked	6 April 2023	(Croatia) Igor Bišćan	6 April 2023	1st
Osijek	(Croatia) Borimir Perković	Mutual consent	22 April 2023	(Croatia) Stjepan Tomas	24 April 2023	4th

== League table ==
Pos	Team	Pld	W	D	L	GF	GA	GD	Pts	Qualification or relegation
1	Dinamo Zagreb (C)	36	24	9	3	81	28	+53	81	Qualification for the Champions League second qualifying round
2	Hajduk Split	36	21	8	7	65	41	+24	71	Qualification to Europa Conference League third qualifying round (Note: Hajduk qualified for the Europa Conference League third qualifying round by winning the 2022–23 Croatian Football Cup.)
3	Osijek	36	13	11	12	46	41	+5	50	Qualification to Europa Conference League second qualifying round
4	Rijeka	36	14	7	15	44	44	0	49	Qualification to Europa Conference League second qualifying round
5	Istra 1961	36	11	13	12	36	38	−2	46	
6	Varaždin	36	12	10	14	41	51	−10	46	
7	Lokomotiva	36	11	10	15	45	50	−5	43	
8	Slaven Belupo	36	10	13	13	27	46	−19	43	
9	Gorica	36	7	11	18	36	50	−14	32	
10	Šibenik (R)	36	5	12	19	24	56	−32	27	Relegation to First Football League

Source: SuperSport HNL
Rules for classification: 1) Points; 2) Head-to-head points; 3) Head-to-head goal difference; 4) Head-to-head goals scored (at home if two teams tied); 5) Goal difference; 6) Goals scored; 7) Play-off
(Note: Criteria 2-4 and 7 is only used if deciding champion, teams to international competition or teams for relegation and in that case criteria 6 will not be used).
(C) Champions; (R) Relegated

== Results ==
Each team plays home-and-away against every other team in the league twice, for a total of 36 matches each played.

Home \ Away	DIN	GOR	HAJ	IST	LOK	OSI	RIJ	SLA	ŠIB	VAR	DIN	GOR	HAJ	IST	LOK	OSI	RIJ	SLA	ŠIB	VAR
Dinamo Zagreb	—	0–0	4–1	4–1	3–2	5–2	3–1	4–1	3–0	3–1	—	4–1	4–0	1–0	2–1	1–1	1–0	4–0	4–0	2–0
Gorica	0–1	—	0–1	0–2	3–2	0–1	0–2	1–1	0–0	0–0	1–1	—	0–0	5–4	1–0	2–0	1–0	0–0	0–3	5–2
Hajduk Split	1–1	3–1	—	2–2	2–1	3–1	2–0	5–1	2–1	2–1	0–0	2–1	—	2–2	3–4	3–0	1–2	1–0	3–0	2–0
Istra 1961	1–0	1–0	0–2	—	1–2	1–0	1–1	0–0	0–0	1–2	0–0	1–0	3–0	—	0–0	1–0	0–2	1–1	3–0	2–1
Lokomotiva	1–2	2–1	2–2	2–0	—	2–1	3–1	0–1	1–1	1–2	1–2	2–2	0–3	3–1	—	1–0	1–2	1–0	1–0	1–1
Osijek	1–0	2–1	2–1	2–0	4–1	—	1–1	0–0	1–1	2–2	0–0	2–0	0–2	1–0	2–2	—	1–1	0–0	0–0	0–1
Rijeka	2–7	1–1	0–1	0–1	3–0	0–3	—	0–1	0–0	1–2	1–2	2–0	2–0	2–2	2–0	1–1	—	0–1	1–0	3–1
Slaven Belupo	1–5	2–1	2–2	0–3	0–0	0–4	2–1	—	0–0	1–0	1–1	1–1	0–1	2–0	0–0	2–1	1–3	—	0–1	1–1
Šibenik	1–2	1–1	1–1	0–0	2–1	0–2	0–1	0–2	—	1–2	2–1	0–4	2–3	0–0	0–4	1–4	1–2	3–1	—	0–2
Varaždin	1–1	2–1	0–2	1–1	0–0	4–1	0–3	0–1	2–2	—	1–3	2–1	1–4	0–0	0–0	1–3	2–0	1–0	2–0	—

Source: SuperSport HNL (in Croatian)
Legend: Blue = home team win; Yellow = draw; Red = away team win.
For upcoming matches, an "a" indicates there is an article about the rivalry between the two participants.

== Statistics ==
=== Top scorers ===
As of 28 May 2023

Rank	Player	Club	Goals
1	(Croatia) Marko Livaja	Hajduk Split	19
2	(Croatia) Matija Frigan	Rijeka	14
3	(Croatia) Fran Brodić	Varaždin	12
3	(Croatia) Luka Ivanušec	Dinamo Zagreb	12
3	(Argentina) Ramón Miérez	Osijek	12
6	(Croatia) Ante Erceg	Istra 1961	11
7	(Slovenia) Jan Mlakar	Hajduk Split	10
7	(Croatia) Bruno Petković	Dinamo Zagreb	10
9	(Croatia) Sandro Kulenović	Lokomotiva	9
10	(Algeria) Monsef Bakrar	Istra 1961	8
10	(Croatia) Dion Drena Beljo	Osijek	8
10	(Croatia) Mijo Caktaš	Osijek	8
10	(Croatia) Mislav Oršić	Dinamo Zagreb	8

== Awards ==
=== Annual awards ===
Award	Winner	Club
Player of the Season	(Croatia) Marko Livaja	Hajduk Split
Manager of the Season	(Croatia) Zoran Zekić	Slaven Belupo
Young Player of the Season	(Croatia) Martin Baturina	Dinamo Zagreb

Team of the Year
Goalkeeper	(Croatia) Dominik Livaković (Dinamo Zagreb)			
Defence	(North Macedonia) Stefan Ristovski (Dinamo Zagreb)	(Croatia) Dino Perić (Dinamo Zagreb)	(Croatia) Josip Šutalo (Dinamo Zagreb)	(Croatia) Dario Melnjak (Hajduk Split)
Midfield	(Croatia) Tonio Teklić (Varaždin)	(Croatia) Martin Baturina (Dinamo Zagreb)		(Croatia) Josip Mišić (Dinamo Zagreb)
Attack	(Croatia) Matija Frigan (Rijeka)	(Croatia) Marko Livaja (Hajduk Split)		(Croatia) Luka Ivanušec (Dinamo Zagreb)

== Attendances ==
#	Club	Average
1	Hajduk	15,345
2	Dinamo Zagreb	6,061
3	Rijeka	4,891
4	Osijek	4,044
5	Varaždin	2,978
6	Istra	1,910
7	Gorica	1,724
8	Lokomotiva	1,438
9	Šibenik	1,241
10	Slaven	1,213
