= Nediljko Labrović =

Croatian footballer (born 1999)

Personal information
- Date of birth: 10 October 1999 (age 27)
- Place of birth: Split, Croatia
- Height: 1.94 m (6 ft 4 in)
- Position: Goalkeeper

Team information
- Current team: Augsburg
- Number: 22

Youth career
- 2007–2010: Glavice
- 2010–2013: Hajduk Split
- 2013–2014: Junak Sinj
- 2015–2017: Adriatic Split

Senior career*
| Years | Team | Apps | (Gls) |
| 2016–2018 | Junak Sinj | 30 | (0) |
| 2018–2021 | Šibenik | 68 | (0) |
| 2021–2024 | Rijeka | 94 | (0) |
| 2024– | Augsburg | 15 | (0) |

International career^{‡}
| 2018–2019 | Croatia U20 | 2 | (0) |
| 2022 | Croatia U23 | 1 | (0) |
| 2024– | Croatia | 1 | (0) |
Medal record
Men's football
Representing Croatia
UEFA Nations League
| Runner-up | 2023 Netherlands |
- * Club domestic league appearances and goals as of 21 December 2024 ‡ National team caps and goals as of 26 March 2024

Nediljko Labrović (born 10 October 1999) is a Croatian professional footballer who plays as a goalkeeper for Bundesliga club Augsburg and the Croatia national team.

== Club career ==
On 9 June 2021, Labrović signed a four-year contract with Rijeka where he was set to replace the outgoing Ivan Nevistić. On 17 July, he made his debut for the club as the starting goalkeeper on the opening matchday of the domestic league in a 2–0 away win over Gorica. Five days later, he made his European debut in a 2–0 win over Gżira United in the first leg of the second round of the UEFA Europa Conference League.

On 11 June 2024, Labrović signed a five-year contract with Augsburg in Germany.

== International career ==
On 14 February 2018, Labrović made his debut for the Croatia national under-20 team playing as a starter in the friendly match against Belarus, which was won 3–1.

Labrović was called up by the senior Croatia side for the Nations League fixtures against Austria on 3 June 2022, France on 6 and 13 June 2022, and Denmark on 10 June 2022. On 31 October 2022, Labrović was named in the preliminary 34-man squad for the 2022 FIFA World Cup, but did not make the final 26.

He made his debut on 26 March 2024 in the FIFA Series Final against Egypt.

== Career statistics ==
=== Club ===
As of match played 28 October 2025

Appearances and goals by club, season and competition
| Club | Season | League | | | National cup (Note: Includes Croatian Football Cup, DFB-Pokal) | | Europe | | Other | | Total | |
| Club | Season | Division | Apps | Goals | Apps | Goals | Apps | Goals | Apps | Goals | Apps | Goals |
|---|---|---|---|---|---|---|---|---|---|---|---|---|
| Šibenik | 2018–19 | Prva NL | 23 | 0 | 2 | 0 | — | | 2 (Note: Appearances in relegation play-offs) | 0 | 27 | 0 |
| Šibenik | 2019–20 | Prva NL | 19 | 0 | 0 | 0 | — | | — | | 19 | 0 |
| Šibenik | 2020–21 | Croatian Football League | 26 | 0 | 2 | 0 | — | | — | | 28 | 0 |
| Šibenik | Total | | 68 | 0 | 4 | 0 | — | | 2 | 0 | 74 | 0 |
| Rijeka | 2021–22 | Croatian Football League | 23 | 0 | 4 | 0 | 3 (Note: Appearances in UEFA Conference League) | 0 | — | | 30 | 0 |
| Rijeka | 2022–23 | Croatian Football League | 36 | 0 | 0 | 0 | 2 | 0 | — | | 38 | 0 |
| Rijeka | 2023–24 | Croatian Football League | 35 | 0 | 0 | 0 | 6 | 0 | — | | 41 | 0 |
| Rijeka | Total | | 94 | 0 | 4 | 0 | 11 | 0 | — | | 109 | 0 |
| FC Augsburg | 2024–25 | Bundesliga | 15 | 0 | 2 | 0 | — | | — | | 17 | 0 |
| FC Augsburg | 2025–26 | Bundesliga | 0 | 0 | 1 | 0 | — | | — | | 1 | 0 |
| FC Augsburg | Total | | 15 | 0 | 3 | 0 | — | | — | | 18 | 0 |
| Career total | | | 177 | 0 | 11 | 0 | 11 | 0 | 2 | 0 | 201 | 0 |

=== International ===
As of match played 26 March 2024

Appearances and goals by national team and year
| National team | Year | Apps | Goals |
|---|---|---|---|
| Croatia | 2024 | 1 | 0 |
| Total | | 1 | 0 |

== Honours ==
Croatia

- UEFA Nations League runner-up: 2022–23

Individual

- Croatian Football League Team of the Year: 2023–24
