= Matija Frigan =

Croatian footballer

Personal information
- Date of birth: 11 February 2003 (age 23)
- Place of birth: Rijeka, Croatia
- Height: 1.85 m (6 ft 1 in)
- Position: Forward

Team information
- Current team: Parma
- Number: 20

Youth career
- –2020: Rijeka

Senior career*
Years	Team	Apps	(Gls)
2020–2023	Rijeka	27	(14)
2021	→ Orijent 1919 (loan)	13	(4)
2022	→ Hrvatski Dragovoljac (loan)	15	(3)
2023–2025	Westerlo	72	(19)
2025–	Parma	6	(0)

International career^{‡}
2021	Croatia U18	2	(3)
2021–2022	Croatia U19	12	(5)
2022	Croatia U20	3	(0)
2022–	Croatia U21	5	(0)
- * Club domestic league appearances and goals as of 28 October 2026 ‡ National team caps and goals as of 4 October 2023

Matija Frigan (born 11 February 2003) is a Croatian professional footballer who plays as a forward for Serie A club Parma.

== Early life ==
Frigan started his career with HNK Rijeka, and was a prolific striker for their youth sides.

== Club career ==
On 15 August 2025, Frigan signed a five-year contract with Parma in Italy.

== International career ==
In August 2023, Frigan received his first call-up to the Croatia senior national team by head coach Zlatko Dalić, for two UEFA Euro 2024 qualifying matches against Latvia and Armenia.

== Career statistics ==
=== Club ===
As of match played 3 May 2024

Appearances and goals by club, season and competition
Club	Season	League			Cup		Continental		Other		Total	
Club	Season	Division	Apps	Goals	Apps	Goals	Apps	Goals	Apps	Goals	Apps	Goals
HNK Rijeka	2020–21	1. HNL	0	0	0	0	1 (Note: Appearances in the UEFA Europa League)	0	0	0	1	0
HNK Rijeka	2021–22	1. HNL	0	0	0	0	0	0	0	0	0	0
HNK Rijeka	2022–23	1. HNL	27	14	2	1	2	0	0	0	31	15
HNK Rijeka	Total		27	14	0	0	3	0	0	0	32	15
Orijent 1919 (loan)	2021–22	2. HNL	13	4	1 (Note: Appearances in the Croatian Cup)	0	–		0	0	14	4
Hrvatski Dragovoljac (loan)	2021–22	1. HNL	15	3	0	0	–		0	0	15	3
Westerlo	2023–24	Belgian Pro League	30	5	1	0	–		0	0	31	5
Career total			85	26	4	1	3	0	0	0	92	27
