= 2021–22 HNK Gorica season =

HNK Gorica
2021–22 season
- Chairman: Nenad Črnko
- Manager: Siniša Oreščanin (until 24 May 2021); Krunoslav Rendulić (30 May 2021 - 3 March 2022); Samir Toplak (since 4 March 2022)
- Stadium: Stadion Radnik
- Prva HNL: 6th
- Croatian Cup: Semi-finals
- Top goalscorer: League: Kristijan Lovrić; Anthony Kalik (7 each); All: Kristijan Lovrić (10)
- Highest home attendance: 4,500 v Dinamo Zagreb (24 April 2022)
- Lowest home attendance: 200 v Hrvatski Dragovoljac (6 March 2022)
- Average home league attendance: 966

The 2021–22 HNK Gorica season was the club's 13th season in existence and the 4th consecutive season in the top flight of Croatian football.

== First-team squad ==
As of 8 May 2022

Note: Flags indicate national team as defined under FIFA eligibility rules; some limited exceptions apply. Players may hold more than one non-FIFA nationality.

No.	Pos.	Nation	Player
2	DF	NGR	Musa Muhammed
3	DF	BIH	Aleksandar Jovičić (2nd Captain)
4	DF	NED	Matthew Steenvoorden
5	DF	BIH	Saša Marjanović
8	MF	NED	Joey Suk
10	MF	CRO	Matija Dvorneković (Captain)
12	GK	CRO	Jan Paolo Debijađi
14	MF	CRO	Josip Mitrović
16	MF	CRO	Toni Fruk (on loan from Fiorentina)
17	MF	CRO	Vinko Skrbin
18	MF	CRO	Patrik Jug
19	FW	BRA	Caio Da Cruz
20	MF	CRO	Hrvoje Babec

No.	Pos.	Nation	Player
21	MF	LTU	Paulius Golubickas
22	FW	NGR	Olabiran Muyiwa (on loan from Dynamo Kyiv)
23	MF	AUS	Anthony Kalik
24	GK	CRO	Dominik Kotarski (on loan from Ajax Amsterdam)
25	DF	CRO	Krešimir Krizmanić
33	DF	MLI	Cheick Keita
50	GK	BIH	Faruk Dalipagić
55	DF	CRO	Jozo Šimunović
70	FW	MKD	Vlatko Stojanovski
77	FW	IRI	Younes Delfi (on loan from SC Charleroi)
80	MF	NGR	Iyayi Atiemwen (on loan from GNK Dinamo Zagreb)
88	MF	CRO	Jurica Pršir
98	FW	SEN	Matar Dieye

== Transfers ==
=== In ===
Pos	Player	Transferred from	Fee	Date	Source
GK	(Croatia) Jan Paolo Debijađi	(Croatia) Kurilovec	Back from loan	1 June 2021	
GK	(Croatia) Kristijan Kahlina	(Bulgaria) Ludogorets Razgrad	Back from loan	1 June 2021	
MF	(Croatia) Gojko Gadže	(Croatia) Orijent 1919	Back from loan	1 June 2021	
MF	(Lithuania) Paulius Golubickas	(Lithuania) Dainava	Back from loan	1 June 2021	
DF	(Croatia) Juraj Spudić	(Croatia) Kurilovec	Back from loan	1 June 2021	
FW	(Brazil) Caio Da Cruz	(Croatia) Kurilovec	Back from loan	1 June 2021	
FW	(Croatia) Marko Muhar	(Croatia) Kurilovec	Back from loan	1 June 2021	
FW	(Senegal) Cherif Ndiaye	(Turkey) Göztepe	Back from loan	1 June 2021	
DF	(Bosnia and Herzegovina) Saša Marjanović	(Croatia) Inter Zaprešić	Free	10 June 2021	
FW	(Croatia) Fran Brodić	(Croatia) Kustošija	Free	10 June 2021	
MF	(Croatia) Martin Šroler	(Croatia) Inter Zaprešić	Back from loan	14 June 2021	
FW	(Croatia) Tin Janušić	(Croatia) Osijek	Free	14 June 2021	
GK	(Croatia) Dominik Kotarski	(Netherlands) Ajax Amsterdam	Loan	15 June 2021	
MF	(Croatia) Toni Fruk	(Italy) Fiorentina	Loan	23 June 2021	
DF	(France) Nathan Cruce-Corcy	(France) SC Air Bel	Free	9 July 2021	
GK	(Bosnia and Herzegovina) Faruk Dalipagić	(Bosnia and Herzegovina) Zrinjski Mostar	Free	11 July 2021	
MF	(Croatia) Niko Janković	(Croatia) Dinamo Zagreb	Loan	14 July 2021	
FW	(North Macedonia) Vlatko Stojanovski	(France) Nîmes Olympique	Free	9 August 2021	
FW	(Nigeria) Olabiran Muyiwa	(Ukraine) Dynamo Kyiv	Loan	1 September 2021	
MF	(Bosnia and Herzegovina) Elvis Sarić	No team	Free	7 September 2021	
DF	(Croatia) Jozo Šimunović	No team	Free	20 October 2021	
GK	(Croatia) Jan Paolo Debijađi	(Croatia) Lučko	Recalled from loan	15 January 2022	
DF	(Croatia) Ante Matej Jurić	(Croatia) Belišće	Undisclosed	31 January 2022	
MF	(Nigeria) Iyayi Atiemwen	(Croatia) Dinamo Zagreb	Loan	15 February 2022	
FW	(Croatia) Tin Janušić	(Croatia) Kustošija	Back from loan	15 February 2022	

Source: Glasilo Hrvatskog nogometnog saveza

=== Out ===
Pos	Player	Transferred to	Fee	Date	Source
GK	(Croatia) Kristijan Kahlina	(Bulgaria) Ludogorets Razgrad	350,000 €	1 June 2021	
MF	(Iraq) Jiloan Hamad	No team	Free	1 June 2021	
FW	(Senegal) Cherif Ndiaye	(Turkey) Göztepe	1,150,000 €	2 June 2021	
FW	(Croatia) Dario Špikić	(Croatia) Dinamo Zagreb	Back from loan	11 June 2021	
MF	(Croatia) Gojko Gadže	(Bosnia and Herzegovina) Zrinjski Mostar	Free	16 June 2021	
FW	(Serbia) Ognjen Mudrinski	(Poland) Jagiellonia Białystok	Back from loan	30 June 2021	
FW	(Liberia) Sylvanus Nimely	No team	Free	1 July 2021	
DF	(Croatia) Juraj Spudić	(Slovenia) Rudar Velenje	Free	19 July 2021	
FW	(Croatia) Tin Janušić	(Croatia) Kustošija	Loan	22 July 2021	
FW	(Croatia) Josip Ivan Zorica	(Croatia) Kustošija	Loan	22 July 2021	
FW	(Croatia) Marko Muhar	(Croatia) Zelengaj Zagreb	Free	23 July 2021	
DF	(Ghana) Nasiru Moro	(Sweden) Örebro SK	200,000 €	27 July 2021	
GK	(Croatia) Leon Išek	(Croatia) Kurilovec	Free	17 August 2021	
MF	(Croatia) Tin Zavalić	(Croatia) Karlovac 1919	Loan	19 August 2021	
GK	(Croatia) Jan Paolo Debijađi	(Croatia) Lučko	Loan	7 September 2021	
MF	(Croatia) Niko Janković	(Croatia) Dinamo Zagreb	Recalled from loan	2 January 2022	
GK	(Croatia) Ivan Banić	(Slovenia) Olimpija Ljubljana	Loan	11 January 2022	
MF	(Bosnia and Herzegovina) Elvis Sarić	(South Korea) Suwon Samsung Bluewings	Free	11 January 2022	
FW	(Croatia) Fran Brodić	(Croatia) Varaždin	Loan	18 January 2022	
MF	(Gabon) Serge-Junior Martinsson Ngouali	(Norway) Sarpsborg 08	200,000 €	2 February 2022	
DF	(Albania) Albi Doka	(Hungary) Honvéd	Loan	11 February 2022	
MF	(Croatia) Martin Šroler	No team	Free	15 February 2022	
FW	(Croatia) Kristijan Lovrić	(Croatia) Osijek	2,250,000 €	15 February 2022	

Source: Glasilo Hrvatskog nogometnog saveza

Total spending: ▼0 €

Total income: ▲4,150,000 €

Total expenditure: ▲4,150,000 €

== Competitions ==
=== Overview ===
Competition	First match	Last match	Starting round	Final position	Record							
Competition	First match	Last match	Starting round	Final position	Pld	W	D	L	GF	GA	GD	Win %
HT Prva liga	17 July 2021	21 May 2022	Matchday 1	6th	36	12	9	15	43	50	−7	33.33
Croatian Cup	14 September 2021	2 March 2022	First round	Semi-finals	4	2	1	1	12	7	+5	50.00
Total					40	14	10	16	55	57	−2	35.00

Last updated: 14 May 2022
Source: Soccerway

=== Prva liga ===
==== League table ====
Pos	Team	Pld	W	D	L	GF	GA	GD	Pts	Qualification or relegation
4	Rijeka	36	20	5	11	71	51	+20	65	Qualification to Europa Conference League second qualifying round
5	Lokomotiva	36	12	13	11	55	50	+5	49	
6	Gorica	36	12	9	15	43	50	−7	45	
7	Slaven Belupo	36	9	9	18	35	54	−19	36	
8	Šibenik	36	9	5	22	46	75	−29	32	

Source: PrvaHNL.hr
Rules for classification: 1) Points; 2) Head-to-head points; 3) Head-to-head goal difference; 4) Head-to-head goals scored (at home if two teams tied); 5) Goal difference; 6) Goals scored; 7) Play-off
(Note: Criteria 2-4 and 7 is only used if deciding champion, teams to international competition or teams for relegation and in that case criteria 6 will not be used).

==== Results summary ====
Overall								Home						Away					
Pld	W	D	L	GF	GA	GD	Pts	W	D	L	GF	GA	GD	W	D	L	GF	GA	GD
36	12	9	15	43	50	−7	45	4	7	7	25	31	−6	8	2	8	18	19	−1

Last updated: 14 May 2022.
Source: Prva HNL

==== Results by round ====
Round	1	2	3	4	5	6	7	8	9	10	11	12	13	14	15	16	17	18	19	20	21	22	23	24	25	26	27	28	29	30	31	32	33	34	35	36
Ground	A	H	A	H	A	H	A	H	A	H	A	H	A	H	A	H	A	H	A	H	A	H	A	H	A	H	A	H	A	H	A	H	A	H	A	H
Result	L	W	W	L	L	W	W	D	L	L	W	D	D	L	W	D	W	D	W	L	L	L	L	L	L	W	D	W	W	D	L	L	L	D	W	D
Position	8	6	4	6	6	6	6	6	6	6	6	6	6	6	6	6	5	5	5	5	5	5	5	6	7	6	6	6	6	6	6	6	6	6	6	6

Updated to match(es) played on 13 May 2022. Source: Prva HNL
A = Away; H = Home; W = Win; D = Draw; L = Loss

==== Matches ====
17 July 2021 1	Rijeka	2–0	Gorica	Rijeka
21:00 CEST (UTC+02:00)	Murić 20' (pen.); Lepinjica 55'	Report	Dieye (yellow card) 12'; Moro (yellow card) 19'	Stadium: Stadion Rujevica; Attendance: 1,652; Referee: Ivan Vučković

24 July 2021 2	Gorica	3–1	Šibenik	Velika Gorica
21:00 CEST (UTC+02:00)	Babec 27'; Keita (yellow card) 50'; Dieye 66'; Bilić 69' (o.g.); Banić (yellow card) 86'; Fruk (yellow card) 88'	Report	Perić (yellow card) 43'; Julardžija (yellow card) 72'; Bilić 87'; Jurić (yellow card) 90+2'	Stadium: Stadion Radnik; Attendance: 400; Referee: Duje Strukan

31 July 2021 3	Istra 1961	1–2	Gorica	Pula
20:00 CEST (UTC+02:00)	Perera (yellow card) 71'; Bandé 90+2'; Matić (yellow card) 90+4'	Report	Krizmanić (yellow card) 10'; Lovrić 19' (yellow card) 77'; Keita (yellow card) 42'; Dieye 68'; Martinsson Ngouali (yellow card) 72'	Stadium: Stadion Aldo Drosina; Attendance: 536; Referee: Zdenko Lovrić

7 August 2021 4	Gorica	1–3	Hajduk Split	Velika Gorica
21:00 CEST (UTC+02:00)	Fruk (yellow card) 35'; Lovrić 56' (yellow card) 87'; Muhammed (yellow card) 79'; Pršir (yellow card) 81'	Report	Mlakar 31'; Vuković 45+1' (yellow card) 51'; Livaja 87'	Stadium: Stadion Radnik; Attendance: 1,576; Referee: Mario Zebec

13 August 2021 5	Dinamo Zagreb	1–0	Gorica	Zagreb
20:00 CEST (UTC+02:00)	Doka 36' (o.g.); Perić (yellow card) 56'; Kastrati (yellow card) 71'	Report	Marjanović (yellow card) 59'	Stadium: Stadion Maksimir; Attendance: 1,282; Referee: Dario Bel

21 August 2021 6	Gorica	1–0	Slaven Belupo	Velika Gorica
18:55 CEST (UTC+02:00)	Doka (yellow card) 13'; Dvorneković 66'; Krizmanić (yellow card) 80'; Kalik (yellow card) 82'	Report	Marina (yellow card) 64'; Soldo (yellow card) 84'	Stadium: Stadion Radnik; Attendance: 200; Referee: Duje Strukan

28 August 2021 7	Lokomotiva	0–1	Gorica	Zagreb
18:55 CEST (UTC+02:00)	Çokaj (yellow card) 39'; Aliyu (yellow card) 72'	Report	Lovrić 74'; Kalik (yellow card) 78'; Doka (yellow card) 82'; Steenvoorden (yellow card) 88'; Jovičić (yellow card) 89'	Stadium: Stadion Kranjčevićeva; Attendance: 384; Referee: Duje Strukan

10 September 2021 8	Gorica	1–1	Hrvatski Dragovoljac	Velika Gorica
20:00 CEST (UTC+02:00)	Pršir (yellow card) 22'; Babec 64'; Steenvoorden (yellow card) 78'; Jovičić (yellow card) 90'	Report	Štrkalj 74'; Lukić (yellow card) 90'	Stadium: Stadion Radnik; Attendance: 412; Referee: Ivana Martinčić

19 September 2020 9	Osijek	3–2	Gorica	Osijek
19:05 CEST (UTC+02:00)	Cheberko (yellow card) 45+1'; Daku 75', 84' (yellow card) 90+4'; Bartolec (yellow card) 79'; Lončar 90+3' (yellow card) 90+3'	Report	Kalik 30' (yellow card) 52'; Jovičić (yellow card) 44'; Krizmanić (yellow card) 75'; Brodić 80'; Šroler (yellow card) 83'; Babec (yellow card) 90+4'	Stadium: Gradski Vrt Stadium; Attendance: 1,361; Referee: Fran Jović

26 September 2021 10	Gorica	3–4	Rijeka	Velika Gorica
17:00 CEST (UTC+02:00)	Lovrić 11' (pen.) (yellow card) 24'; Mitrović (yellow card) 21'; Marjanović 45+3'; Pršir (yellow card) 48'; Sarić (yellow card) 49'; Delfi (red card) 51'; Doka (yellow card) 57'; Fruk 90'	Report	Krešić (yellow card) 11'; Murić (yellow card) 19' (goal) 58' (pen.); Abass 43'; Selahi 46'; Bušnja (yellow card) 88'; Pavičić 90+1'	Stadium: Stadion Radnik; Attendance: 1,000; Referee: Mario Zebec

1 October 2021 11	Šibenik	1–2	Gorica	Šibenik
18:00 CEST (UTC+02:00)	Ćurić 66'	Report	Fruk 15', 41'; Jovičić (yellow card) 38'; Kalik (yellow card) 49'; Stojanovski (yellow card) 78'; Janković (yellow card) 84'	Stadium: Stadion Šubićevac; Attendance: 466; Referee: Tihomir Pejin

16 October 2021 12	Gorica	1–1	Istra 1961	Velika Gorica
15:00 CEST (UTC+02:00)	Mlinar 12' (o.g.); Sarić (yellow card) 45+2'; Muhammed (yellow card) 83'; Keita (yellow card) 90+2'	Report	Mlinar (yellow card) 24'; Bandé (yellow card) 35' (goal) 54'; Perera (yellow card) 56'; Blagojević (yellow card) 74'	Stadium: Stadion Radnik; Attendance: 386; Referee: Tihomir Pejin

23 October 2021 13	Hajduk Split	0–0	Gorica	Split
17:05 CEST (UTC+02:00)	Simić (yellow card) 90+2'	Report	Sarić (yellow card) 83'; Krizmanić (yellow card) 90+1'	Stadium: Stadion Poljud; Attendance: 5,406; Referee: Ante Čuljak

30 October 2021 14	Gorica	0–2	Dinamo Zagreb	Velika Gorica
17:05 CEST (UTC+02:00)	Lovrić (yellow card) 35'; Delfi (yellow card) 89'	Report	Petković 31' (pen.) (yellow card) 52'; Andrić 37'; Gojak (yellow card) 42'	Stadium: Stadion Radnik; Attendance: 1,293; Referee: Zdenko Lovrić

5 November 2021 15	Slaven Belupo	1–2	Gorica	Koprivnica
18:00 CET (UTC+01:00)	Zvonarek (yellow card) 15'; Laušić (yellow card) 17' (goal) 43'	Report	Pršir (yellow card) 41'; Kalik 45', 62' (yellow card) 82'; Doka (yellow card) 58'; Jovičić (yellow card) 76'	Stadium: Gradski stadion Attendance: 300; Referee: Dario Kulušić

21 November 2021 16	Gorica	2–2	Lokomotiva	Velika Gorica
15:00 CET (UTC+01:00)	Fruk 3'; Pršir 24'; Jovičić (yellow card) 43'; Stojanovski (yellow card) 56'	Report	Aliyu 34'; Cipetić (yellow card) 50'; Kačavenda (yellow card) 53'; Pivarić 60'	Stadium: Stadion Radnik; Attendance: 350; Referee: Dario Bel

27 November 2021 17	Hrvatski Dragovoljac	0–1	Gorica	Zagreb
15:00 CET (UTC+01:00)	Vulikić (yellow card) 58'	Report	Lovrić 70'; Muhammed (yellow card) 90'	Stadium: Stadion Kranjčevićeva; Attendance: 105; Referee: Dario Kulušić

4 December 2021 18	Gorica	1–1	Osijek	Velika Gorica
13:00 CET (UTC+01:00)	Pršir 6'; Šimunović (yellow card) 15'; Lovrić (yellow card) 41'; Kalik (yellow card) 82'	Report	Hiroš (yellow card) 9' (goal) 45+3'; Jurčević (yellow card) 39'; Kleinheisler (yellow card) 47' (yellow-red card) 61'; Jugović (yellow card) 49'; Nejašmić (yellow card) 56'; Lončar (yellow card) 74'	Stadium: Stadion Radnik; Attendance: 673; Referee: Goran Pečarić

11 December 2021 19	Rijeka	1–2	Gorica	Rijeka
17:05 CET (UTC+01:00)	Ampem (yellow card) 17' (yellow-red card) 34'; Galović (yellow card) 30'; Drmić 78'; Selahi (yellow card) 80'	Report	Doka (yellow card) 42'; Lovrić 64'; Delfi 76'; Mitrović (yellow card) 80'; Steenvoorden (yellow card) 82'; Brodić (yellow card) 86'	Stadium: Stadion Rujevica; Attendance: 3,082; Referee: Dario Bel

18 December 2021 20	Gorica	2–3	Šibenik	Velika Gorica
13:00 CET (UTC+01:00)	Lovrić 12'; Brodić (yellow card) 58'; Stojanovski 68'	Report	A. Jakoliš 30'; Kvesić (yellow card) 47'; Delić 51'; Dasilva (yellow card) 80'; Cvetković (yellow card) 81'; M. Jakoliš 87'; Batarelo (yellow card) 89'	Stadium: Stadion Radnik; Attendance: 387; Referee: Duje Strukan

28 January 2022 21	Istra 1961	2–1	Gorica	Pula
18:00 CET (UTC+01:00)	Marin (yellow card) 44'; Lučić (yellow card) 45'; Perković 58'; Beljo 74'; Serderov (yellow card) 82'	Report	Jovičić 6'; Kalik (yellow card) 45+1'; Keita (yellow card) 69'; Babec (yellow card) 72'; Muhammed (yellow card) 82'	Stadium: Stadion Aldo Drosina; Attendance: 262; Referee: Fran Jović

5 February 2022 22	Gorica	0–4	Hajduk Split	Velika Gorica
15:00 CET (UTC+01:00)	Steenvoorden (yellow card) 73'; Babec (yellow card) 79'	Report	Ferro 3'; Livaja 39' (pen.), 82'; Mlakar 58'	Stadium: Stadion Radnik; Attendance: 1,600; Referee: Tihomir Pejin

12 February 2022 23	Dinamo Zagreb	2–1	Gorica	Zagreb
17:05 CET (UTC+01:00)	Ivanušec (yellow card) 39'; Ademi 55'; Oršić 89'; Ristovski (yellow card) 89'; Andrić (yellow card) 90+1'; Zagorac (yellow card) 90+1'; Tolić (yellow card) 90+2'	Report	Steenvoorden (yellow card) 24'; Jovičić (yellow card) 40'; Lovrić (yellow card) 70'; Keita (yellow card) 90'; Kalik 64' (yellow card) 90+2'	Stadium: Stadion Maksimir; Attendance: 2,432; Referee: Dario Bel

18 February 2022 24	Gorica	0–3	Slaven Belupo	Velika Gorica
18:00 CET (UTC+01:00)	Pršir (yellow card) 34'; Jovičić (red card) 56'	Report	Caimacov 2'; Zvonarek 10'; Marina (yellow card) 40' (goal) 56' (pen.)	Stadium: Stadion Radnik; Attendance: 285; Referee: Ivan Bebek

26 February 2022 25	Lokomotiva	2–0	Gorica	Zagreb
15:00 CET (UTC+01:00)	Kulenović 18'; Smakaj (yellow card) 39'; Dabro 71'	Report	Kotarski (yellow card) 59'; Atiemwen (yellow card) 61'	Stadium: Stadion Kranjčevićeva; Attendance: 319; Referee: Dario Kulušić

6 March 2022 26	Gorica	4–0	Hrvatski Dragovoljac	Velika Gorica
15:00 CET (UTC+01:00)	Atiemwen (yellow card) 18' (goal) 22' (pen.); Kalik (yellow card) 40' (goal) 59'; Muhammed 47'; Da Cruz 52'	Report	Frigan (yellow card) 2'; Kukoč (yellow card) 9'; Šubarić (red card) 45'; Cvetković (yellow card) 84'	Stadium: Stadion Radnik; Attendance: 200; Referee: Ivan Bebek

13 March 2022 27	Osijek	0–0	Gorica	Osijek
17:05 CET (UTC+01:00)	Lovrić (yellow card) 4'; Grgić (yellow card) 56'; Miérez (yellow card) 71'; Ivušić (yellow card) 86'; Lončar (yellow card) 90'; Kleinheisler (yellow card) 90+3'	Report	Muhammed (yellow card) 38'; Atiemwen (yellow card) 45+1'; Da Cruz (yellow card) 63'; Golubickas (yellow card) 77'	Stadium: Gradski Vrt Stadium; Attendance: 2,856; Referee: Ante Čuljak

19 March 2022 28	Gorica	1–0	Rijeka	Velika Gorica
15:00 CET (UTC+01:00)	Da Cruz (yellow card) 55' (yellow-red card) 60'; Čestić 73' (o.g.); Muhammed (yellow card) 90+8'	Report	Ampem (yellow card) 26'; Gnezda Čerin (yellow card) 90+1'	Stadium: Stadion Radnik; Attendance: 1,150; Referee: Tihomir Pejin

2 April 2022 29	Šibenik	0–1	Gorica	Šibenik
17:00 CEST (UTC+02:00)	Vidović (yellow card) 62'	Report	Babec (yellow card) 13'; Stojanovski 40'	Stadium: Stadion Šubićevac; Attendance: 487; Referee: Dario Bel

8 April 2022 30	Gorica	1–1	Istra 1961	Velika Gorica
18:00 CEST (UTC+02:00)	Muhammed (yellow card) 54'; Mitrović 62' (yellow card) 67'	Report	Galilea (yellow card) 34'; Beljo 55' (pen.)	Stadium: Stadion Radnik; Attendance: 1,086; Referee: Ivan Bebek

15 April 2022 31	Hajduk Split	1–0	Gorica	Split
20:05 CEST (UTC+02:00)	Jovičić 13' (o.g.); Krovinović (yellow card) 45'; Katić (yellow card) 79'	Report	Keita (yellow card) 58'	Stadium: Stadion Poljud; Attendance: 11,482; Referee: Tihomir Pejin

24 April 2022 32	Gorica	0–1	Dinamo Zagreb	Velika Gorica
19:05 CEST (UTC+02:00)	Muhammed (yellow card) 25'; Kalik (yellow card) 29'; Atiemwen (yellow card) 69'; Pršir (yellow card) 76'	Report	Mišić (yellow card) 25'; Livaković (yellow card) 29'; Ademi 86'; Ristovski (yellow card) 90+3'	Stadium: Stadion Radnik; Attendance: 4,500; Referee: Zdenko Lovrić

30 April 2022 33	Slaven Belupo	2–1	Gorica	Koprivnica
17:00 CEST (UTC+02:00)	Hoxha (yellow card) 37'; Zapata (yellow card) 68'; Krstanović 72'; Kvržić (yellow card) 74'; Božić 81'	Report	Babec 19'; Šimunović (yellow card) 30'; Mitrović (yellow card) 70'; Stojanovski (yellow card) 72'; Kalik (yellow card) 74'	Stadium: Gradski stadion Attendance: 505; Referee: Marin Vidulin

7 May 2022 34	Gorica	3–3	Lokomotiva	Velika Gorica
17:00 CEST (UTC+02:00)	Pršir (yellow card) 13'; Atiemwen 24'; Keita (yellow card) 30' (yellow-red card) 43'; Kalik 40', 90' (pen.) (yellow card) 82'; Jovičić (yellow card) 43'; Mitrović (yellow card) 44'	Report	Çokaj (yellow card) 35'; Pivarić (yellow card) 38' (yellow-red card) 67' (goal) 42'; Aliyu 63'; Kulenović 85'	Stadium: Stadion Radnik; Attendance: 723; Referee: Tihomir Pejin

13 May 2022 35	Hrvatski Dragovoljac	0–2	Gorica	Zagreb
18:00 CEST (UTC+02:00)	Brtan (yellow card) 32'; Bristrić (yellow card) 81'	Report	Fruk 5'; Muhammed (yellow card) 19'; Golubickas 78'; Marjanović (yellow card) 81'	Stadium: Stadion Kranjčevićeva; Attendance: 120; Referee: Patrik Kolarić

21 May 2022 36	Gorica	1–1	Osijek	Velika Gorica
17:05 CEST (UTC+02:00)	Šimunović (yellow card) 14'; Jovičić 30'; Keita (yellow card) 46'	Report	Bartolec 68'; Lovrić (red card) 82'	Stadium: Stadion Radnik; Attendance: 895; Referee: Ante Čulina

=== Croatian Football Cup ===
14 September 2021 R1	Nehaj	3–7	Gorica	Senj
16:00 CEST (UTC+02:00)	Tomac 11', 36'; T. Lagumdžija (yellow card) 22'; Prizmić 28'; Pejanović (yellow card) 29'	Report	Lovrić 9', 78' (pen.) (yellow card) 75'; Pršir 13' (yellow card) 52'; Mitrović 47', 82'; Svast 54' (0.g.); Dieye 88'	Stadium: Pod Nehajem; Attendance: 100; Referee: Marin Vidulin

27 October 2021 R2	Gorica	2–0	Mladost Ždralovi	Velika Gorica
15:00 CEST (UTC+02:00)	Stojanovski 48' (pen.); Janković (yellow card) 54'; Šroler 60'; Muhammed (yellow card) 90+1'	Report	Abramović (yellow card) 29'; Jakšić (yellow card) 39'; Sabljić (yellow card) 44'	Stadium: Stadion Radnik; Attendance: 212; Referee: Zdenko Lovrić

30 November 2021 QF	Gorica	2–2 (4–2 p)	Istra 1961	Velika Gorica
16:00 CET (UTC+01:00)	Fruk (yellow card) 34'; Dieye 45+2'; Muhammed (yellow card) 38'; Lovrić (yellow card) 51' (goal) 90+6'; Steenvoorden (yellow card) 88'; Suk (yellow card) 95'	Report	Beljo 11', 80'; Hujber (yellow card) 36'; Marin (yellow card) 69'; Mlinar (yellow card) 88'; Lučić (yellow card) 90+1'; Desio (yellow card) 90+2'	Stadium: Stadion Radnik; Attendance: 320; Referee: Duje Strukan
	Penalties
	Jovičić (penalty scored); Suk (penalty scored); Brodić (penalty scored); Steenvoorden (penalty scored)		Desio (penalty scored); Galilea (penalty scored); Iličić (penalty missed); Silva (penalty missed)

2 March 2022 SF	Hajduk Split	2–1	Gorica	Split
17:30 CET (UTC+01:00)	Melnjak 39', 64'	Report	Dieye (yellow card) 48'; Kalik 90+4' (pen.)	Stadium: Stadion Poljud; Attendance: 13,063; Referee: Zdenko Lovrić

== Player seasonal records ==
Updated 22 May 2022

=== Goals ===
Rank	Name	League	Cup	Total
1	(Croatia) Kristijan Lovrić	7	3	10
2	(Australia) Anthony Kalik	7	1	8
3	(Croatia) Toni Fruk	5	–	5
4	(Senegal) Matar Dieye	2	2	4
5	(Croatia) Hrvoje Babec	3	–	3
5	(Croatia) Jurica Pršir	2	1	3
5	(North Macedonia) Vlatko Stojanovski	2	1	3
5	(Croatia) Josip Mitrović	1	2	3
9	(Nigeria) Iyayi Atiemwen	2	–	2
9	(Bosnia and Herzegovina) Aleksandar Jovičić	2	–	2
11	(Croatia) Fran Brodić	1	–	1
11	(Brazil) Caio Da Cruz	1	–	1
11	(Iran) Younes Delfi	1	–	1
11	(Croatia) Matija Dvorneković	1	–	1
11	(Lithuania) Paulius Golubickas	1	–	1
11	(Bosnia and Herzegovina) Saša Marjanović	1	–	1
11	(Nigeria) Musa Muhammed	1	–	1
11	(Croatia) Martin Šroler	–	1	1
Own goals		3	1	4
TOTALS		43	12	55

Source: Competitive matches

=== Clean sheets ===
Rank	Name	League	Cup	Total
1	(Croatia) Dominik Kotarski	7	1	8
2	(Croatia) Ivan Banić	2	–	2
TOTALS		9	1	10

Source: Competitive matches

=== Disciplinary record ===
Number	Position	Player	1. HNL			Croatian Cup			Total		
Number	Position	Player	Yellow card	(yellow card) (yellow-red card)	Red card	Yellow card	(yellow card) (yellow-red card)	Red card	Yellow card	(yellow card) (yellow-red card)	Red card
2	DF	(Nigeria) Musa Muhammed	9	0	0	2	0	0	11	0	0
3	DF	(Bosnia and Herzegovina) Aleksandar Jovičić	8	0	1	0	0	0	8	0	1
4	DF	(Netherlands) Matthew Steenvoorden	5	0	0	1	0	0	6	0	0
5	DF	(Bosnia and Herzegovina) Saša Marjanović	2	0	0	0	0	0	2	0	0
6	DF	(Ghana) Nasiru Moro	1	0	0	0	0	0	1	0	0
7	FW	(Croatia) Kristijan Lovrić	6	0	0	2	0	0	8	0	0
8	MF	(Netherlands) Joey Suk	0	0	0	1	0	0	1	0	0
9	MF	(Croatia) Martin Šroler	1	0	0	0	0	0	1	0	0
11	FW	(Croatia) Fran Brodić	2	0	0	0	0	0	2	0	0
14	MF	(Croatia) Josip Mitrović	5	0	0	0	0	0	5	0	0
16	MF	(Croatia) Toni Fruk	2	0	0	1	0	0	3	0	0
17	DF	(Albania) Albi Doka	5	0	0	0	0	0	5	0	0
18	MF	(Gabon) Serge-Junior Martinsson Ngouali	1	0	0	0	0	0	1	0	0
19	FW	(Brazil) Caio Da Cruz	1	1	0	0	0	0	1	1	0
20	MF	(Croatia) Hrvoje Babec	4	0	0	0	0	0	4	0	0
21	MF	(Lithuania) Paulius Golubickas	1	0	0	0	0	0	1	0	0
23	MF	(Australia) Anthony Kalik	12	0	0	0	0	0	12	0	0
24	GK	(Croatia) Dominik Kotarski	1	0	0	0	0	0	1	0	0
25	DF	(Croatia) Krešimir Krizmanić	4	0	0	0	0	0	4	0	0
27	MF	(Bosnia and Herzegovina) Elvis Sarić	3	0	0	0	0	0	3	0	0
31	GK	(Croatia) Ivan Banić	1	0	0	0	0	0	1	0	0
33	DF	(Mali) Cheick Keita	7	1	0	0	0	0	7	1	0
44	MF	(Croatia) Niko Janković	1	0	0	1	0	0	2	0	0
55	DF	(Croatia) Jozo Šimunović	3	0	0	0	0	0	3	0	0
70	FW	(North Macedonia) Vlatko Stojanovski	3	0	0	0	0	0	3	0	0
77	FW	(Iran) Younes Delfi	1	0	1	0	0	0	1	0	1
80	MF	(Nigeria) Iyayi Atiemwen	4	0	0	0	0	0	4	0	0
88	MF	(Croatia) Jurica Pršir	7	0	0	1	0	0	8	0	0
98	FW	(Senegal) Matar Dieye	1	0	0	1	0	0	2	0	0
TOTALS			101	2	2	10	0	0	111	2	2

=== Appearances and goals ===
Number	Position	Player	Apps	Goals	Apps	Goals	Apps	Goals
Number	Position	Player	Total		1. HNL (Note: First number represents appearances in starting eleven, while the second number indicates a substitute appearance.)		Croatian Cup	
2	DF	(Nigeria) Musa Muhammed	23	1	20+0	1	2+1	0
3	DF	(Bosnia and Herzegovina) Aleksandar Jovičić	35	2	32+0	2	2+1	0
4	DF	(Netherlands) Matthew Steenvoorden	25	0	15+6	0	4+0	0
5	DF	(Bosnia and Herzegovina) Saša Marjanović	7	1	2+4	1	1+0	0
6	DF	(Ghana) Nasiru Moro	1	0	1+0	0	0+0	0
7	FW	(Croatia) Kristijan Lovrić	24	10	20+1	7	2+1	3
8	MF	(Netherlands) Joey Suk	12	0	4+6	0	0+2	0
9	MF	(Croatia) Martin Šroler	14	1	5+7	0	1+1	1
10	MF	(Croatia) Matija Dvorneković	17	1	1+14	1	1+1	0
11	FW	(Croatia) Fran Brodić	10	1	1+8	1	0+1	0
12	GK	(Croatia) Jan Paolo Debijađi	1	0	1+0	0	0+0	0
14	MF	(Croatia) Josip Mitrović	35	3	24+8	1	2+1	2
16	MF	(Croatia) Toni Fruk	32	5	16+13	5	2+1	0
17	DF	(Albania) Albi Doka	15	0	11+2	0	2+0	0
17	MF	(Croatia) Vinko Skrbin	2	0	0+2	0	0+0	0
18	MF	(Croatia) Patrik Jug	6	0	0+6	0	0+0	0
18	MF	(Gabon) Serge-Junior Martinsson Ngouali	14	0	9+3	0	1+1	0
19	FW	(Brazil) Caio Da Cruz	19	1	12+5	1	0+2	0
20	MF	(Croatia) Hrvoje Babec	38	3	32+2	3	3+1	0
21	MF	(Lithuania) Paulius Golubickas	14	1	4+9	1	0+1	0
22	FW	(Nigeria) Olabiran Muyiwa	5	0	0+4	0	0+1	0
23	MF	(Australia) Anthony Kalik	31	8	25+2	7	3+1	1
24	GK	(Croatia) Dominik Kotarski	28	0	24+0	0	4+0	0
25	DF	(Croatia) Krešimir Krizmanić	27	0	24+1	0	2+0	0
27	DF	(Croatia) David Sim	1	0	0+1	0	0+0	0
27	MF	(Bosnia and Herzegovina) Elvis Sarić	5	0	5+0	0	0+0	0
29	FW	(Croatia) Lovro Nezirović	1	0	0+1	0	0+0	0
30	MF	(Croatia) Luka Brlek	1	0	0+1	0	0+0	0
31	GK	(Croatia) Ivan Banić	11	0	11+0	0	0+0	0
33	DF	(Mali) Cheick Keita	31	0	27+1	0	3+0	0
44	MF	(Croatia) Niko Janković	9	0	0+8	0	1+0	0
55	DF	(Croatia) Jozo Šimunović	8	0	7+1	0	0+0	0
70	FW	(North Macedonia) Vlatko Stojanovski	24	3	8+15	2	1+0	1
77	FW	(Iran) Younes Delfi	22	1	8+13	1	0+1	0
80	MF	(Nigeria) Iyayi Atiemwen	10	2	9+0	2	1+0	0
88	MF	(Croatia) Jurica Pršir	33	3	22+7	2	3+1	1
98	FW	(Senegal) Matar Dieye	29	4	16+9	2	3+1	2
