= 2020–21 HNK Gorica season =

HNK Gorica
2020–21 season
- Chairman: Nenad Črnko
- Manager: Valdas Dambrauskas (until 3 January 2021); Siniša Oreščanin (since 3 January 2021)
- Stadium: Stadion Radnik
- Prva HNL: 5th
- Croatian Cup: Semi-finals
- Top goalscorer: League: Kristijan Lovrić (15); All: Kristijan Lovrić (18)
- Highest home attendance: 1,523 v Hajduk Split (3 October 2020)
- Lowest home attendance: 837 v Istra 1961 (19 September 2020)
- Average home league attendance: 131

The 2020–21 HNK Gorica season was the club's 12th season in existence and the 3rd consecutive season in the top flight of Croatian football.

== First-team squad ==
As of 23 May 2021

Note: Flags indicate national team as defined under FIFA eligibility rules; some limited exceptions apply. Players may hold more than one non-FIFA nationality.

No.	Pos.	Nation	Player
2	DF	NGR	Musa Muhammed
3	DF	BIH	Aleksandar Jovičić (Captain)
4	DF	NED	Matthew Steenvoorden
6	DF	GHA	Nasiru Moro
7	MF	IRQ	Jiloan Hamad
8	MF	NED	Joey Suk
9	FW	SRB	Ognjen Mudrinski (on loan from Jagiellonia Białystok)
10	MF	CRO	Matija Dvorneković
11	FW	CRO	Dario Špikić (on loan from Dinamo Zagreb)
12	GK	CRO	Ivan Ševerdija
14	MF	CRO	Josip Mitrović
17	DF	ALB	Albi Doka
18	MF	GAB	Serge-Junior Martinsson Ngouali
20	MF	CRO	Hrvoje Babec

No.	Pos.	Nation	Player
23	MF	AUS	Anthony Kalik
25	DF	CRO	Krešimir Krizmanić
29	FW	CRO	Josip Ivan Zorica
30	GK	CRO	Patrick Crnolatec
31	GK	CRO	Ivan Banić
32	MF	CRO	Tin Zavalić
33	DF	MLI	Cheick Keita
44	FW	CRO	Kristijan Lovrić
45	FW	LBR	Sylvanus Nimely
50	GK	CRO	Leon Išek
79	FW	IRI	Younes Delfi (on loan from Charleroi)
88	MF	CRO	Jurica Pršir
98	FW	SEN	Matar Dieye

== Transfers ==
=== In ===
Pos	Player	Transferred from	Fee	Date	Source
DF	(Ghana) Nasiru Moro	(Croatia) Sesvete	Back from loan	30 June 2020	
DF	(Croatia) Juraj Spudić	(Croatia) Kurilovec	Back from loan	30 June 2020	
MF	(Croatia) Martin Šroler	(Croatia) Sesvete	Back from loan	30 June 2020	
MF	(Lithuania) Paulius Golubickas	(Lithuania) Dainava	50,000 €	2 August 2020	
DF	(Albania) Albi Doka	(Albania) Tirana	Free	10 August 2020	
MF	(Croatia) Josip Mitrović	(Croatia) Rijeka	Free	11 August 2020	
FW	(Senegal) Matar Dieye	(Ukraine) Olimpik Donetsk	Free	3 September 2020	
FW	(Iran) Younes Delfi	(Belgium) Charleroi	Loan	14 September 2020	
MF	(Croatia) Jurica Pršir	(Croatia) Hajduk Split	Free	12 October 2020	
GK	(Croatia) Leon Išek	(Croatia) Primorac Biograd na Moru	Recalled from loan	15 October 2020	
FW	(Liberia) Sylvanus Nimely	(Russia) Spartak-2 Moscow	Free	4 February 2021	
DF	(Mali) Cheick Keita	No team	Free	5 February 2021	
FW	(Croatia) Dario Špikić	(Croatia) Dinamo Zagreb	Loan	5 February 2021	
MF	(Gabon) Serge-Junior Martinsson Ngouali	(Sweden) Hammarby IF	Free	15 February 2021	
FW	(Brazil) Caio Da Cruz	(Brazil) Vasco da Gama	Free	19 February 2021	

Source: Glasilo Hrvatskog nogometnog saveza

=== Out ===
Pos	Player	Transferred to	Fee	Date	Source
GK	(Croatia) Ivan Čović	No team	Free	25 July 2020	
DF	(Croatia) Maks Juraj Čelić	No team	Free	25 July 2020	
MF	(Poland) Michał Masłowski	No team	Free	25 July 2020	
MF	(Lithuania) Paulius Golubickas	(Lithuania) Dainava	Back from loan	28 July 2020	
MF	(Croatia) Martin Šroler	(Croatia) Inter Zaprešić	Loan	12 August 2020	
FW	(Senegal) Cherif Ndiaye	(Turkey) Göztepe	Loan	12 August 2020	
GK	(Croatia) Marko Veriga	(Croatia) Vrapče	Free	18 August 2020	
FW	(Croatia) Marko Muhar	(Croatia) Kurilovec	Loan	26 August 2020	
GK	(Croatia) Leon Išek	(Croatia) Primorac Biograd na Moru	Loan	31 August 2020	
MF	(Croatia) Gojko Gadže	(Croatia) Orijent 1919	Loan	15 September 2020	
DF	(Croatia) Juraj Spudić	(Croatia) Kurilovec	Loan	24 September 2020	
MF	(Croatia) Dario Čanađija	(Romania) Astra Giurgiu	400,000 €	5 October 2020	
GK	(Croatia) Jan Paolo Debijađi	(Croatia) Kurilovec	Loan	24 October 2020	
DF	(Croatia) Marijan Čabraja	(Croatia) Dinamo Zagreb	1,600,000 €	1 February 2021	
FW	(Croatia) Dario Špikić	(Croatia) Dinamo Zagreb	600,000 €	4 February 2021	
FW	(Brazil) Caio Da Cruz	(Croatia) Kurilovec	Loan	19 February 2021	
GK	(Croatia) Kristijan Kahlina	(Bulgaria) Ludogorets Razgrad	Loan	28 February 2021	
MF	(Lithuania) Paulius Golubickas	(Lithuania) Dainava	Loan	11 March 2021	

Source: Glasilo Hrvatskog nogometnog saveza

Total spending: ▼50,000 €

Total income: ▲2,600,000 €

Total expenditure: ▲2,550,000 €

== Competitions ==
=== Overview ===
Competition	First match	Last match	Starting round	Final position	Record							
Competition	First match	Last match	Starting round	Final position	Pld	W	D	L	GF	GA	GD	Win %
HT Prva liga	14 August 2020	22 May 2021	Matchday 1	5th	36	17	8	11	60	47	+13	47.22
Croatian Cup	9 September 2020	28 April 2021	Preliminary round	Semi-finals	5	4	0	1	12	8	+4	80.00
Total					41	21	8	12	72	55	+17	51.22

Source: Soccerway

=== HT Prva liga ===
==== League table ====
Pos	Team	Pld	W	D	L	GF	GA	GD	Pts	Qualification or relegation
3	Rijeka	36	18	7	11	51	46	+5	61	Qualification for the Europa Conference League second qualifying round
4	Hajduk Split	36	18	6	12	48	37	+11	60	Qualification for the Europa Conference League second qualifying round
5	Gorica	36	17	8	11	60	47	+13	59	
6	Šibenik	36	9	8	19	32	47	−15	35	
7	Slaven Belupo	36	7	13	16	36	53	−17	34	

Source: PrvaHNL.hr
Rules for classification: 1) Points; 2) Head-to-head points; 3) Head-to-head goal difference; 4) Head-to-head goals scored (at home if two teams tied); 5) Goal difference; 6) Goals scored; 7) Play-off
(Note: Criteria 2-4 and 7 is only used if deciding champion, teams to international competition or teams for relegation and in that case criteria 6 will not be used).

==== Results summary ====
Overall								Home						Away					
Pld	W	D	L	GF	GA	GD	Pts	W	D	L	GF	GA	GD	W	D	L	GF	GA	GD
36	17	8	11	60	47	+13	59	8	5	5	28	24	+4	9	3	6	32	23	+9

Source: Prva HNL

==== Results by round ====
Round	1	2	3	4	5	6	7	8	9	10	11	12	13	14	15	16	17	18	19	20	21	22	23	24	25	26	27	28	29	30	31	32	33	34	35	36
Ground	A	A	H	A	H	A	H	A	H	H	H	A	H	A	H	A	H	H	A	A	H	A	H	A	H	A	H	H	H	A	H	A	H	A	H	A
Result	W	W	W	W	D	L	W	L	D	W	L	W	D	D	W	W	L	W	L	W	W	W	W	D	D	L	L	D	L	D	W	W	W	L	L	L
Position	2	2	2	2	2	2	2	3	3	3	3	3	3	3	3	3	3	3	3	3	3	3	3	3	3	3	3	3	3	4	3	3	3	3	3	5

Source: Prva HNL
A = Away; H = Home; W = Win; D = Draw; L = Loss

==== Matches ====
14 August 2020 1	Varaždin	1–5	Gorica	Varaždin
20:00 CEST (UTC+02:00)	Đurasek 62'	Report	Muhammed (yellow card) 10'; Kalik (yellow card) 22'; Ndiaye (yellow card) 28'; Špikić 38'; Steenvoorden (yellow card) 64'; Mudrinski 81', 90+4'; Doka 90'; Čanađija 90+1'	Stadium: Stadion Varteks; Attendance: 0 Referee: Duje Strukan

22 August 2020 2	Slaven Belupo	1–2	Gorica	Koprivnica
17:55 CEST (UTC+02:00)	Glavčić 45+1'	Report	Kalik (yellow card) 81'; Mudrinski 86', 90+2'	Stadium: Gradski stadion Attendance: 0 Referee: Marin Vidulin

28 August 2020 3	Gorica	3–2	Šibenik	Velika Gorica
20:00 CEST (UTC+02:00)	Mudrinski 3'; Lovrić 65'; Babec 75'; Doka (yellow card) 80'	Report	Pandža (yellow card) 57'; Rak 87'; Anočić 90+3'	Stadium: Stadion Radnik; Attendance: 0 Referee: Ivan Vučković

13 September 2020 4	Lokomotiva	1–2	Gorica	Zagreb
19:05 CEST (UTC+02:00)	Kovačić (yellow card) 62'; Karačić 89'	Report	Čabraja (yellow card) 18'; Lovrić 32', 85'; Dvorneković (yellow card) 66'	Stadium: Stadion Kranjčevićeva; Attendance: 0 Referee: Dario Kulušić

19 September 2020 5	Gorica	2–2	Istra 1961	Velika Gorica
17:00 CEST (UTC+02:00)	Špikić (yellow card) 11' (goal) 29'; Lovrić (yellow card) 56'; Steenvoorden (red card) 73'; Delfi 89'	Report	Gržan (yellow card) 7' (goal) 76' (pen.); Vuk 11'; Galilea (yellow card) 30'; Tomašević (yellow card) 41'	Stadium: Stadion Radnik; Attendance: 837; Referee: Dario Bel

26 September 2020 6	Osijek	2–1	Gorica	Osijek
19:05 CEST (UTC+02:00)	Miérez 45+2' (pen.); Grgić 90+7'; Ndockyt (yellow card) 90+10'	Report	Babec (yellow card) 16'; Doka (yellow card) 45+2' (yellow-red card) 72'; Lovrić 84'	Stadium: Gradski Vrt Stadium; Attendance: 1,970; Referee: Marin Vidulin

3 October 2020 7	Gorica	2–1	Hajduk Split	Velika Gorica
19:05 CEST (UTC+02:00)	Babec (yellow card) 37'; Lovrić 62' (pen.); Hamad 78'	Report	Caktaš (yellow card) 29' (goal) 45' (pen.); Čolina (yellow card) 48' (yellow-red card) 70'; Jurić (yellow card) 51'	Stadium: Stadion Radnik; Attendance: 1,523; Referee: Damir Batinić

17 October 2020 8	Dinamo Zagreb	3–2	Gorica	Zagreb
19:00 CEST (UTC+02:00)	Gavranović 32', 36', 66'; Majer (yellow card) 56'; Leovac (yellow card) 56'; Petković (yellow card) 88'	Report	Čabraja (yellow card) 11'; Suk (yellow card) 27'; Mudrinski 46'; Hamad 50'; Kalik (yellow card) 68'	Stadium: Stadion Maksimir; Attendance: 815; Referee: Ivan Bebek

20 November 2020 12	Šibenik	1–3	Gorica	Šibenik
19:05 CET (UTC+01:00)	Ampem 7'	Report	Čabraja 62'; Suk 82'; Lovrić 90+3'	Stadium: Stadion Šubićevac; Attendance: 0 Referee: Dario Bel

23 November 2020 10	Gorica	1–0	Varaždin	Velika Gorica
18:00 CET (UTC+01:00)	Lovrić 20' (pen.); Kalik (yellow card) 37'; Hamad (yellow card) 57'	Report	Milić (yellow card) 61'; Đurasek (yellow card) 81'	Stadium: Stadion Radnik; Attendance: 0 Referee: Dario Kulušić

28 November 2020 13	Gorica	1–1	Lokomotiva	Velika Gorica
17:05 CET (UTC+01:00)	Kalik (yellow card) 11'; Lovrić 13' (pen.); Mitrović (yellow card) 37'; Steenvoorden (yellow card) 54'; Suk (yellow card) 73'	Report	Kolinger (yellow card) 47'; Tuci 50'	Stadium: Stadion Radnik; Attendance: 0 Referee: Zdenko Lovrić

2 December 2020 11	Gorica	0–1	Slaven Belupo	Velika Gorica
17:00 CET (UTC+01:00)	Steenvoorden (yellow card) 54'; Jovičić (yellow card) 90+2'	Report	Soldo 54'	Stadium: Stadion Radnik; Attendance: 0 Referee: Ivan Bebek

12 December 2020 15	Gorica	4–1	Osijek	Velika Gorica
15:00 CET (UTC+01:00)	Dieye 13'; Lovrić (yellow card) 26'; Špikić (yellow card) 39'; Moro (yellow card) 46'; Kalik 54' 65'; Mitrović 78'	Report	Miérez 49'; Majstorović (yellow card) 87'	Stadium: Stadion Radnik; Attendance: 0 Referee: Fran Jović

20 December 2020 16	Hajduk Split	2–4	Gorica	Split
17:05 CET (UTC+01:00)	Atanasov 24'; Diamantakos 63'; Dimitrov (yellow card) 79'	Report	Dieye 6'; Lovrić 54' (pen.) 76' (pen.); Moro 89'	Stadium: Stadion Poljud; Attendance: 0 Referee: Ivan Bebek

19 January 2021 14	Istra 1961	1–1	Gorica	Pula
16:00 CET (UTC+01:00)	Špoljarić (yellow card) 52'; Vuk 57'; Galilea (yellow card) 90'	Report	Golubickas (yellow card) 9'; Jovičić 68'	Stadium: Stadion Aldo Drosina; Attendance: 0 Referee: Ivan Vučković

23 January 2021 17	Gorica	3–4	Dinamo Zagreb	Velika Gorica
17:05 CET (UTC+01:00)	Dieye 10' (yellow card) 77'; Lovrić 42'; Špikić (yellow card) 52' (goal) 61'; Muhammed (yellow card) 88'; Banić (yellow card) 88'	Report	Ivanušec 34'; Oršić 40'; Petković 90' (pen.); Théophile-Catherine 90+5'	Stadium: Stadion Radnik; Attendance: 0 Referee: Mario Zebec

31 January 2021 18	Rijeka	0–2	Gorica	Rijeka
17:05 CET (UTC+01:00)	Galović (yellow card) 80'; Capan (red card) 90+5'	Report	Andrijašević 27' (o.g.); Lovrić 44'; Suk (yellow card) 48'; Dvorneković (yellow card) 50'; Babec (yellow card) 51'; Banić (yellow card) 84'; Moro (red card) 90+4'	Stadium: Stadion Rujevica; Attendance: 0 Referee: Fran Jović

3 February 2021 19	Varaždin	2–1	Gorica	Varaždin
15:00 CET (UTC+01:00)	Senić (yellow card) 10'; Petković (yellow card) 19'; Obregón 76'; Boban 90'	Report	Lovrić 21'; Golubickas (yellow card) 89'	Stadium: Stadion Varteks; Attendance: 0 Referee: Damir Batinić

8 February 2021 20	Slaven Belupo	0–1	Gorica	Koprivnica
18:00 CET (UTC+01:00)	Etoundi (yellow card) 33'; van Bruggen (yellow card) 45+6'; Lulić (yellow card) 65'	Report	Suk (yellow card) 15'; Lovrić 59' (yellow card) 79'; Steenvoorden (yellow card) 65'	Stadium: Gradski stadion Attendance: 0 Referee: Duje Strukan

13 February 2021 21	Gorica	1–0	Šibenik	Velika Gorica
15:00 CET (UTC+01:00)	Kalik (yellow card) 9'; Babec 71'	Report		Stadium: Stadion Radnik; Attendance: 0 Referee: Damir Batinić

17 February 2021 9	Gorica	0–0	Rijeka	Velika Gorica
17:00 CET (UTC+01:00)	Mitrović (yellow card) 12'; Krizmanić (yellow card) 40'; Doka (yellow card) 57'; Keita (yellow card) 86'	Report	(yellow card) 81' Mudražija; (yellow card) 89' Gnezda Čerin	Stadium: Stadion Radnik; Attendance: 0 Referee: Tihomir Pejin

20 February 2021 22	Lokomotiva	0–3	Gorica	Zagreb
17:05 CET (UTC+01:00)	Petrak (yellow card) 90+1'	Report	Steenvoorden 10'; Mudrinski (yellow card) 42'; Kalik (yellow card) 64'; Matar Dieye 74'; Mitrović 83'; Moro (yellow card) 85'	Stadium: Stadion Kranjčevićeva; Attendance: 0 Referee: Dario Bel

28 February 2021 23	Gorica	2–1	Istra 1961	Velika Gorica
15:00 CET (UTC+01:00)	Lovrić 50' (yellow card) 54'; Jovičić (yellow card) 52'; Mudrinski 73'	Report	Bandé 25'; Perera (yellow card) 62'	Stadium: Stadion Radnik; Attendance: 0 Referee: Zdenko Lovrić

7 March 2021 24	Osijek	1–1	Gorica	Osijek
15:00 CET (UTC+01:00)	Škorić (yellow card) 71'; Igor Silva (yellow card) 73'; Bohar 88' (pen.)	Report	Nimely (yellow card) 20'; Dieye 55'; Martinsson Ngouali (yellow card) 67'; Mitrović (yellow card) 80'	Stadium: Gradski Vrt Stadium; Attendance: 0 Referee: Ivan Bebek

13 March 2021 25	Gorica	1–1	Hajduk Split	Velika Gorica
17:05 CET (UTC+01:00)	Mujakić 6' (o.g.)	Report	Simić (yellow card) 36'; Atanasov 45'	Stadium: Stadion Radnik; Attendance: 0 Referee: Fran Jović (Zagreb)

21 March 2021 26	Dinamo Zagreb	1–0	Gorica	Zagreb
17:30 CET (UTC+01:00)	Petković (yellow card) 19', (goal) 47'; Čabraja (yellow card) 50'; Mišić (yellow card) 90+4'	Report	Muhammed (yellow card) 13'; Dvorneković (yellow card) 68'; Dieye (yellow card) 71'; Babec (yellow card) 79'	Stadium: Stadion Maksimir; Attendance: 0 Referee: Dario Kulušić

3 April 2021 27	Gorica	3–4	Rijeka	Velika Gorica
20:00 CEST (UTC+02:00)	Mitrović 73'; Nimely (yellow card) 77' (yellow-red card) 90+1'; Mudrinski 83'; Galović 85' (o.g.); Jovičić (yellow card) 89'	Report	10' Andrijašević; 13' Drmić; (yellow card) 48' Štefulj; 50' Murić; 64' Gnezda Čerin; (yellow card) 74' Andrijašević; (yellow card) 85' Lončar	Stadium: Stadion Radnik; Attendance: 0 Referee: Duje Strukan

10 April 2021 28	Gorica	0–0	Varaždin	Velika Gorica
17:00 CEST (UTC+02:00)	Moro (yellow card) 20'; Babec (yellow card) 41'; Dvorneković (yellow card) 46'; Kalik (yellow card) 73'; Krizmanić (yellow card) 79'	Report	Guera Djou (yellow card) 87'	Stadium: Stadion Radnik; Attendance: 0 Referee: Zdenko Lovrić

16 April 2021 29	Gorica	0–1	Slaven Belupo	Velika Gorica
18:05 CEST (UTC+02:00)	Pršir (yellow card) 28'; Muhammed (yellow card) 52'; Nimely (yellow card) 58'	Report	Knöll 38'; Bogojević (yellow card) 70'; Filipović (yellow card) 80'; Delić (yellow card) 90'	Stadium: Stadion Radnik; Attendance: 0 Referee: Marin Vidulin

20 April 2021 30	Šibenik	1–1	Gorica	Šibenik
17:00 CEST (UTC+02:00)	Pajić (yellow card) 27'; Sahiti 40'; Bulat (yellow card) 68'; Mina (yellow card) 84' (yellow-red card) 87'	Report	Steenvoorden (yellow card) 9'; Krizmanić (yellow card) 45+1'; Nimely (yellow card) 55'; Muhammed (yellow card) 69'; Delfi 88', (yellow card) 90+5'	Stadium: Stadion Šubićevac; Attendance: 0 Referee: Fran Jović

24 April 2021 31	Gorica	4–2	Lokomotiva	Velika Gorica
19:05 CEST (UTC+02:00)	Hamad 5' (yellow card) 79'; Mudrinski 28'; Steenvoorden (yellow card) 45+3' (yellow-red card) 56'; Špikić 53' 74'; Dieye (yellow card) 89'	Report	Pivarić 19' (pen.) 57' (pen.); Çokaj (yellow card) 66'; Lešković (yellow card) 86'; Bonansea (red card) 90'	Stadium: Stadion Radnik; Attendance: 0 Referee: Damir Batinić

2 May 2021 32	Istra 1961	0–2	Gorica	Pula
17:00 CEST (UTC+02:00)	Silva (yellow card) 18'; Hujber (yellow card) 62' (yellow-red card) 79'; Lončar (yellow card) 86'; Tomašević (yellow card) 87'	Report	Martinsson Ngouali (yellow card) 39'; Špikić 42'; Delfi (yellow card) 51'; Babec (yellow card) 59'; Krizmanić (yellow card) 83'; Mitrović 90+4'	Stadium: Stadion Aldo Drosina; Attendance: 0 Referee: Duje Strukan

7 May 2021 33	Gorica	1–0	Osijek	Velika Gorica
19:10 CEST (UTC+02:00)	Martinsson Ngouali (yellow card) 34'; Jovičić 49'	Report	Guti (yellow card) 79'; Škorić (yellow card) 84'	Stadium: Stadion Radnik; Attendance: 0 Referee: Ivan Bebek

12 May 2021 34	Hajduk Split	4–0	Gorica	Split
20:10 CEST (UTC+02:00)	Vušković 14'; Kačaniklić 16'; Livaja 23' (pen.); Biuk 39'	Report	Muhammed (yellow card) 33'; Krizmanić (yellow card) 41'	Stadium: Stadion Poljud; Attendance: 0 Referee: Tihomir Pejin

16 May 2021 35	Gorica	0–3	Dinamo Zagreb	Velika Gorica
19:10 CEST (UTC+02:00)		Report	Gavranović 3', 36', 90+3'; Baturina (yellow card) 90+2'	Stadium: Stadion Radnik; Attendance: 0 Referee: Dario Bel

22 May 2021 36	Rijeka	2–1	Gorica	Rijeka
17:00 CEST (UTC+02:00)	Andrijašević 10'; Vukčević (yellow card) 58'; Menalo 79'; Pavičić (yellow card) 85'	Report	Babec 19' (yellow card) 34'; Steenvoorden (yellow card) 27'; Krizmanić (yellow card) 82'; Jovičić (yellow card) 85'; Doka (yellow card) 86'	Stadium: Stadion Rujevica; Attendance: 0 Referee: Dario Bel

Source: Croatian Football Federation

=== Croatian Football Cup ===
9 September 2020 PR	Gorica	1–0	Belišće	Velika Gorica
18:00 CEST (UTC+02:00)	Suk (yellow card) 21'; Spudić 28'; Krizmanić (yellow card) 60'	Report	Kovačić (yellow card) 16'	Stadium: Stadion Radnik; Attendance: 0 Referee: Marko Cestarić

7 October 2020 R1	Sesvete	3–4	Gorica	Sesvete
15:00 CEST (UTC+02:00)	Majić 17'; Kožić 35'; Geljić (yellow card) 37' (goal) 59' (pen.); Malekinušić (yellow card) 76'	Report	Hamad 3'; Mitrović 4' 28'; Sabljo 21' (o.g.); Kalik (yellow card) 32'; Suk (yellow card) 34'; Jovičić (yellow card) 42'; Čabraja (yellow card) 54'	Stadium: Stadion ŠRC Sesvete; Attendance: 0 Referee: Ivana Martinčić

7 December 2020 R2	Gorica	3–1	Lokomotiva Zagreb	Velika Gorica
17:00 CET (UTC+01:00)	Mitrović 29'; Jovičić (yellow card) 60'; Lovrić 72'; Hamad (yellow card) 74'; Dieye 77'; Krizmanić (yellow card) 82'; Babec (yellow card) 89'	Report	Aliyu 50'	Stadium: Stadion Radnik; Attendance: 0 Referee: Ivan Bebek

16 March 2021 QF	Gorica	3–0	Hajduk Split	Velika Gorica
18:00 CET (UTC+01:00)	Kalik (yellow card) 7'; Lovrić 10' 82'; Steenvoorden (yellow card) 59'; Nimely 87'	Report	Simić (yellow card) 21'	Stadium: Stadion Radnik; Attendance: 0 Referee: Dario Bel (Osijek)

28 April 2021 SF	Dinamo Zagreb	4–1 (a.e.t.)	Gorica	Zagreb
18:00 CEST (UTC+02:00)	Mišić 47', (yellow card) 77'; Kastrati (yellow card) 89'; Jakić 100'; Majer 110'; Ademi 119'	Report	Špikić 3'; Krizmanić (yellow card) 13'; Keita (yellow card) 26' (yellow-red card) 48'; Pršir (yellow card) 86'	Stadium: Stadion Maksimir; Attendance: 0 Referee: Mario Zebec

Source: Croatian Football Federation

== Player seasonal records ==
Updated 23 May 2021

=== Goals ===
Rank	Name	League	Cup	Total
1	(Croatia) Kristijan Lovrić	15	3	18
2	(Serbia) Ognjen Mudrinski	9	–	9
3	(Croatia) Dario Špikić	6	1	7
3	(Croatia) Josip Mitrović	4	3	7
5	(Senegal) Matar Dieye	5	1	6
6	(Iraq) Jiloan Hamad	3	1	4
7	(Croatia) Hrvoje Babec	3	–	3
8	(Iran) Younes Delfi	2	–	2
8	(Bosnia and Herzegovina) Aleksandar Jovičić	2	–	2
8	(Australia) Anthony Kalik	2	–	2
11	(Croatia) Marijan Čabraja	1	–	1
11	(Croatia) Dario Čanađija	1	–	1
11	(Albania) Albi Doka	1	–	1
11	(Ghana) Nasiru Moro	1	–	1
11	(Netherlands) Matthew Steenvoorden	1	–	1
11	(Netherlands) Joey Suk	1	–	1
11	(Liberia) Sylvanus Nimely	–	1	1
11	(Croatia) Juraj Spudić	–	1	1
Own goals		3	1	4
TOTALS		60	12	72

Source: Competitive matches

=== Clean sheets ===
Rank	Name	League	Cup	Total
1	(Croatia) Ivan Banić	8	2	10
2	(Croatia) Kristijan Kahlina	1	–	1
TOTALS		9	2	11

Source: Competitive matches

=== Disciplinary record ===
Number	Position	Player	1. HNL			Croatian Cup			Total		
Number	Position	Player	Yellow card	(yellow card) (yellow-red card)	Red card	Yellow card	(yellow card) (yellow-red card)	Red card	Yellow card	(yellow card) (yellow-red card)	Red card
1	GK	(Croatia) Kristijan Kahlina	1	0	0	0	0	0	1	0	0
2	DF	(Nigeria) Musa Muhammed	6	0	0	0	0	0	6	0	0
3	DF	(Bosnia and Herzegovina) Aleksandar Jovičić	4	0	0	2	0	0	6	0	0
4	DF	(Netherlands) Matthew Steenvoorden	6	1	1	1	0	0	7	1	1
6	DF	(Ghana) Nasiru Moro	3	0	1	0	0	0	3	0	1
7	MF	(Iraq) Jiloan Hamad	2	0	0	1	0	0	3	0	0
8	MF	(Netherlands) Joey Suk	4	0	0	2	0	0	6	0	0
9	FW	(Serbia) Ognjen Mudrinski	1	0	0	0	0	0	1	0	0
10	MF	(Croatia) Matija Dvorneković	4	0	0	0	0	0	4	0	0
11	FW	(Croatia) Dario Špikić	3	0	0	0	0	0	3	0	0
14	MF	(Croatia) Josip Mitrović	3	0	0	0	0	0	3	0	0
17	DF	(Albania) Albi Doka	3	1	0	0	0	0	3	1	0
18	MF	(Gabon) Serge-Junior Martinsson Ngouali	3	0	0	0	0	0	3	0	0
19	DF	(Croatia) Marijan Čabraja	2	0	0	1	0	0	3	0	0
20	MF	(Croatia) Hrvoje Babec	7	0	0	1	0	0	8	0	0
21	MF	(Lithuania) Paulius Golubickas	2	0	0	0	0	0	2	0	0
23	MF	(Australia) Anthony Kalik	8	0	0	2	0	0	10	0	0
25	DF	(Croatia) Krešimir Krizmanić	6	0	0	3	0	0	9	0	0
31	GK	(Croatia) Ivan Banić	2	0	0	0	0	0	2	0	0
33	DF	(Mali) Cheick Keita	1	0	0	0	1	0	1	1	0
44	FW	(Croatia) Kristijan Lovrić	4	0	0	0	0	0	4	0	0
45	FW	(Liberia) Sylvanus Nimely	3	1	0	0	0	0	3	1	0
79	FW	(Iran) Younes Delfi	2	0	0	0	0	0	2	0	0
88	MF	(Croatia) Jurica Pršir	1	0	0	1	0	0	2	0	0
98	FW	(Senegal) Matar Dieye	3	0	0	0	0	0	3	0	0
99	FW	(Senegal) Cherif Ndiaye	1	0	0	0	0	0	1	0	0
TOTALS			85	3	2	14	1	0	99	4	2

=== Appearances and goals ===
Number	Position	Player	Apps	Goals	Apps	Goals	Apps	Goals
Number	Position	Player	Total		1. HNL (Note: First number represents appearances in starting eleven, while the second number indicates a substitute appearance.)		Croatian Cup	
1	GK	(Croatia) Kristijan Kahlina	16	0	14+0	0	2+0	0
2	DF	(Nigeria) Musa Muhammed	27	0	18+5	0	4+0	0
3	DF	(Bosnia and Herzegovina) Aleksandar Jovičić	33	2	28+0	2	5+0	0
4	DF	(Netherlands) Matthew Steenvoorden	30	1	27+0	1	3+0	0
6	DF	(Ghana) Nasiru Moro	17	1	8+5	1	1+3	0
7	MF	(Iraq) Jiloan Hamad	31	4	16+11	3	3+1	1
8	MF	(Netherlands) Joey Suk	24	1	19+2	1	3+0	0
9	FW	(Serbia) Ognjen Mudrinski	30	9	11+16	9	1+2	0
10	MF	(Croatia) Matija Dvorneković	38	0	10+23	0	3+2	0
11	FW	(Croatia) Dario Špikić	37	7	30+4	6	2+1	1
14	MF	(Croatia) Josip Mitrović	30	7	9+17	4	3+1	3
17	DF	(Albania) Albi Doka	26	1	19+4	1	1+2	0
18	MF	(Gabon) Serge-Junior Martinsson Ngouali	12	0	6+5	0	1+0	0
19	DF	(Croatia) Marijan Čabraja	19	1	17+0	1	2+0	0
20	MF	(Croatia) Hrvoje Babec	38	3	32+1	3	3+2	0
21	MF	(Lithuania) Paulius Golubickas	14	0	2+10	0	1+1	0
22	MF	(Croatia) Gojko Gadže	1	0	0+0	0	1+0	0
23	MF	(Australia) Anthony Kalik	24	2	18+3	2	2+1	0
25	DF	(Croatia) Krešimir Krizmanić	32	0	24+4	0	3+1	0
31	GK	(Croatia) Ivan Banić	25	0	22+0	0	3+0	0
33	DF	(Mali) Cheick Keita	10	0	5+4	0	1+0	0
33	DF	(Croatia) Juraj Spudić	1	1	0+0	0	1+0	1
44	FW	(Croatia) Kristijan Lovrić	32	18	24+5	15	2+1	3
45	FW	(Liberia) Sylvanus Nimely	11	1	5+4	0	0+2	1
77	MF	(Croatia) Dario Čanađija	8	1	5+2	1	1+0	0
79	FW	(Iran) Younes Delfi	5	2	1+4	2	0+0	0
88	MF	(Croatia) Jurica Pršir	16	0	3+10	0	0+3	0
98	FW	(Senegal) Matar Dieye	34	6	22+8	5	3+1	1
99	FW	(Senegal) Cherif Ndiaye	2	0	2+0	0	0+0	0
