= List of Croatian football transfers winter 2022–23 =

This is a list of Croatian football transfers for the 2022–23 winter transfer window. Only transfers featuring Croatian Football League are listed.

== Croatian Football League ==
Note: Flags indicate national team as has been defined under FIFA eligibility rules. Players may hold more than one non-FIFA nationality.

=== Dinamo Zagreb ===
In:

No.	Pos.	Nation	Player
39	DF	CRO	Mauro Perković (on loan from Istra 1961)

Out:

No.	Pos.	Nation	Player
3	DF	CRO	Daniel Štefulj (on loan to (Slovenia) Celje)
6	DF	DEN	Rasmus Lauritsen (to (Denmark) Brøndby)
11	FW	AZE	Mahir Emreli (on loan to (Turkey) Konyaspor)
20	FW	CRO	Antonio Marin (on loan to Rijeka)
66	DF	AUT	Emir Dilaver (to Rijeka)
99	FW	CRO	Mislav Oršić (to (England) Southampton)
—	GK	BIH	Faris Krkalić (on loan to Kustošija)
—	DF	CRO	Maro Katinić (on loan to (Slovenia) Bravo)
—	MF	CRO	Marko Soldo (on loan to Šibenik)
—	DF	MNE	Stefan Milić (on loan to (Bulgaria) Septemvri Sofia, previously on loan at (Slovenia) Bravo)
—	DF	CRO	Dominik Braun (on loan to Hrvatski Dragovoljac, previously on loan at Lokomotiva)
—	DF	CRO	Filip Brekalo (on loan to (Slovenia) Gorica, previously on loan at Varaždin)
—	MF	CRO	Niko Janković (on loan to Rijeka, previously on loan at (Bosnia and Herzegovina) Zrinjski Mostar)
—	MF	MNE	Milan Vukotić (on loan to (Bosnia and Herzegovina) Zrinjski Mostar, previously on loan at (Slovenia) Tabor Sežana)
—	MF	CRO	Ivan Šaranić (on loan to Varaždin, previously on loan at (Slovenia) Bravo)
—	FW	AUS	Deni Jurić (on loan to Rijeka, previously on loan at Gorica)
—	FW	BIH	Vinko Rozić (on loan to (Bosnia and Herzegovina) Posušje, previously on loan at (Bosnia and Herzegovina) Široki Brijeg)
—	MF	CRO	Marko Đira (to Šibenik)
—	FW	MNE	Andrija Kolundzić (to (Montenegro) Iskra Danilovgrad)
—	DF	KOR	Kim Hyun-woo (to (South Korea) Daejeon Hana Citizen, previously on loan at (South Korea) Ulsan Hyundai)
—	MF	WAL	Robbie Burton (free agent, previously on loan at (Republic of Ireland) Sligo Rovers)

=== Hajduk Split ===
In:

No.	Pos.	Nation	Player
4	DF	POR	Ferro (from (Portugal) Benfica, previously on loan at (Netherlands) Vitesse)
11	MF	MAR	Yassine Benrahou (from (France) Nîmes)
13	GK	AUT	Ivan Lučić (from Istra 1961)
20	FW	USA	Agustin Anello (on loan from (Belgium) Lommel)

Out:

No.	Pos.	Nation	Player
3	DF	CRO	David Čolina (to (Germany) FC Augsburg)
4	MF	CRO	Josip Vuković (on loan to (Saudi Arabia) Al-Faisaly)
11	FW	NGA	Samuel Eduok (free agent)
15	DF	BUL	Kristian Dimitrov (to (Bulgaria) Levski Sofia)
18	FW	CRO	Ivan Šarić (to (Slovenia) Mura)
20	MF	MKD	Jani Atanasov (to (Poland) Cracovia)
22	MF	CRO	Ivan Krolo (on loan to Šibenik)
27	FW	CRO	Stipe Biuk (to (United States) Los Angeles)
—	DF	CRO	Ivan Dominić (on loan to (Finland) KuPS)
—	MF	CRO	Franjo Lazar (on loan to Orijent, previously on loan at Jarun Zagreb)
—	MF	CRO	Tino Blaž Lauš (on loan to (Bosnia and Herzegovina) Velež Mostar, previously on loan at Istra 1961)
—	FW	CRO	Marin Ljubičić (to (Austria) LASK, previously on loan)

=== Osijek ===
In:

No.	Pos.	Nation	Player

Out:

No.	Pos.	Nation	Player
1	GK	CRO	Ivica Ivušić (to (Cyprus) Pafos)
2	DF	CRO	Karlo Bartolec (to (Hungary) Puskás Akadémia)
5	MF	HUN	László Kleinheisler (to (Greece) Panathinaikos)
9	FW	CRO	Dion Drena Beljo (to (Germany) FC Augsburg)
10	MF	BIH	Amer Hiroš (on loan to Šibenik)
22	DF	CRO	Danijel Lončar (to (Poland) Pogoń Szczecin)
28	DF	CRO	Slavko Bralić (on loan to Gorica)
29	FW	CRO	Kristian Fućak (on loan to Gorica)
32	DF	CRO	Uwem Alexander (on loan to Hrvatski Dragovoljac)
95	FW	CRO	Antonio Mance (to (Hungary) Debrecen)
—	DF	CRO	Luka Zebec (on loan to Bijelo Brdo)
—	FW	CRO	Vinko Petković (on loan to Gorica, previously on loan at Istra 1961)

=== Rijeka ===
In:

No.	Pos.	Nation	Player
3	DF	CRO	Bruno Goda (free agent)
4	MF	CRO	Niko Janković (on loan from Dinamo Zagreb, previously on loan at (Bosnia and Herzegovina) Zrinjski Mostar)
7	MF	BIH	Mario Vrančić (from (England) Stoke City, previously on loan)
22	MF	ZAM	Emmanuel Banda (from (Sweden) Djurgården)
30	FW	CRO	Bruno Bogojević (free agent)
39	FW	AUS	Deni Jurić (on loan from Dinamo Zagreb, previously on loan at Gorica)
44	FW	CRO	Antonio Marin (on loan from Dinamo Zagreb)
66	DF	AUT	Emir Dilaver (from Dinamo Zagreb)
77	DF	POR	Danilo Veiga (from (Portugal) Gil Vicente)

Out:

No.	Pos.	Nation	Player
4	DF	CRO	Mateo Pavlović (on loan to (France) Saint-Étienne)
7	MF	BIH	Mario Vrančić (on loan to (Bosnia and Herzegovina) Sarajevo)
10	MF	CRO	Alen Halilović (free agent)
17	FW	CRO	Matej Vuk (to Istra 1961)
19	FW	SVN	Haris Vučkić (to (Thailand) Buriram United)
20	DF	COL	Andrés Solano (free agent)
21	DF	SUI	Nikita Vlasenko (free agent)
22	DF	CRO	Roko Jurišić (to (Austria) SV Ried)
23	MF	CRO	Denis Bušnja (on loan to (Slovenia) Bravo)
27	FW	BIH	Admir Bristrić (to (Slovenia) Olimpija Ljubljana)
30	MF	CAN	Antoine Coupland (on loan to (Canada) Whitecaps 2)
34	MF	GHA	Jacob Aboosah (loan return to (Ghana) EurAfrica)
44	FW	CRO	Filip Dujmović (to Kustošija)
47	MF	CRO	Damjan Pavlović (on loan to (Sweden) Degerfors)
80	MF	CRO	Bernard Karrica (on loan to (Slovenia) Gorica)
96	MF	ITA	Gabriel Lunetta (on loan to (Italy) Südtirol)
—	MF	GHA	Prince Arthur (loan return to (Ghana) EurAfrica)

=== Lokomotiva ===
In:

No.	Pos.	Nation	Player
18	MF	CRO	Marko Hanuljak (from (Bosnia and Herzegovina) Posušje)
20	DF	CRO	Branimir Kalaica (free agent)

Out:

No.	Pos.	Nation	Player
2	DF	CRO	Dominik Braun (loan return to Dinamo Zagreb)
4	MF	CRO	Mate Maleš (retired)
18	DF	CRO	Ivan Tomečak (to Gorica)
28	FW	CRO	Mario Veljača (on loan to Hrvatski Dragovoljac)
—	GK	CRO	Matija Jesenović (on loan to Međimurje)
—	GK	CRO	Luka Matasović (on loan to Zadar, previously on loan at Jarun Zagreb)
—	DF	CRO	Marko Milošević (on loan to Marsonia 1909, previously on loan at Jarun Zagreb)
—	DF	CRO	David Čondrić (to Zagorec Krapina, previously on loan at Jarun Zagreb)
—	MF	CRO	Ivan Roca (to (Bosnia and Herzegovina) Posušje, previously on loan)
—	MF	MNE	Đorđe Magdelinić (on loan to (Montenegro) Berane, previously on loan at Međimurje)
—	FW	CRO	Joško Rendulić (on loan to (Montenegro) Berane, previously on loan at Međimurje)
—	FW	ALB	Arbër Mehmetllari (to (Albania) Laçi)

=== Gorica ===
In:

No.	Pos.	Nation	Player
9	FW	CRO	Kristian Fućak (on loan from Osijek)
13	DF	CRO	Robert Ćosić (from Rudeš)
15	MF	CRO	Filip Mrzljak (free agent)
21	GK	CRO	Božidar Radošević (from Varaždin)
32	DF	CRO	Slavko Bralić (on loan from Osijek)
44	DF	CRO	Ivan Tomečak (from Lokomotiva)
77	DF	CRO	Valentino Majstorović (free agent)
89	FW	SVN	Tim Matavž (from (Cyprus) Omonia)
90	DF	CRO	Dino Štiglec (from (Israel) Hapoel Haifa)
95	FW	CRO	Vinko Petković (on loan from Osijek, previously on loan at Istra 1961)

Out:

No.	Pos.	Nation	Player
3	DF	BIH	Aleksandar Jovičić (to (Hungary) Kisvárda)
5	DF	BIH	Saša Marjanović (to (Slovakia) Michalovce)
6	DF	USA	Amet Korça (to (United States) FC Dallas)
7	MF	AUS	Tyrese Francois (loan return to (England) Fulham)
9	FW	AUS	Deni Jurić (loan return to Dinamo Zagreb)
15	DF	SEN	Moussa Wagué (free agent)
19	FW	BRA	Caio Da Cruz (on loan to Dugopolje)
21	MF	LTU	Paulius Golubickas (to (Lithuania) Žalgiris)
23	MF	AUT	Dominik Prokop (on loan to (Austria) TSV Hartberg)
24	MF	CRO	Fran Tomek (loan return to Dinamo Zagreb)
71	MF	BRA	Wallace (to (Bosnia and Herzegovina) Velež Mostar)
—	FW	CRO	Vanja Kulenović (to Samobor)
—	MF	CRO	Domenik Quni (on loan to Lukavec, previously on loan at Karlovac)
—	FW	CRO	Antonijo Vujičić (on loan to Lukavec)
—	FW	CRO	Tin Janušić (on loan to Dugo Selo, previously on loan at Sesvete)
—	FW	ZAM	Peter Chikola (to (Spain) Cádiz Mirandilla)
—	FW	ZAM	Albert Kangwanda (to (Zambia) Kafue Celtic)

=== Slaven Belupo ===
In:

No.	Pos.	Nation	Player
7	FW	CRO	Antonio Perošević (free agent)

Out:

No.	Pos.	Nation	Player
2	DF	CRO	Matko Zirdum (to (Malaysia) Kuala Lumpur City)
7	MF	ENG	Matthias Fanimo (to (Slovenia) Koper)
16	DF	BIH	Zoran Kvržić (to Šibenik)
27	FW	CRO	Luka Branšteter (loan return to Osijek II)
28	MF	BIH	Seid Behram (to Mladost Ždralovi)
—	DF	CRO	Ivan Ganzulić (on loan to Koprivnica)
—	MF	BIH	Emanuel Mađarić (on loan to Mladost Ždralovi)
—	MF	CRO	Ivan Jajalo (on loan to Zrinski Jurjevac, previously on loan at Mladost Ždralovi)
—	MF	CRO	Franko Čordaš (on loan to Ponikve, previously on loan at Mladost Ždralovi)
—	FW	CRO	Luka Artuković (to Kurilovec, previously on loan at Koprivnica)

=== Šibenik ===
In:

No.	Pos.	Nation	Player
6	MF	CRO	Marko Soldo (on loan from Dinamo Zagreb)
9	FW	CRO	Dejan Radonjić (from (Cyprus) Anorthosis)
21	MF	ESP	Iker Pozo (from (England) Manchester City)
23	MF	CRO	Ivan Krolo (on loan from Hajduk Split)
24	MF	BIH	Amer Hiroš (on loan from Osijek)
30	FW	CRO	Josip Knežević (free agent)
33	DF	SRB	Nikola Đorić (on loan from Austria Klagenfurt)
44	MF	CRO	Marko Đira (from Dinamo Zagreb)
77	MF	CRO	Dario Čanađija (from (Norway) Aalesund)
88	DF	BIH	Zoran Kvržić (from Slaven Belupo)

Out:

No.	Pos.	Nation	Player
4	DF	CRO	Ivica Batarelo (to Croatia Zmijavci)
6	MF	AUT	Patrick Salomon (to (Austria) TWL Elektra)
7	FW	KOS	Suad Sahiti (to (Kosovo) Llapi)
19	FW	CRO	Ivan Delić (on loan to (Italy) Cosenza)
23	DF	SVN	Matija Rom (free agent)
27	MF	CRO	Niko Rak (to (Turkey) Konyaspor)
28	MF	AUT	Marcel Canadi (to (Australia) Brisbane Roar)
29	MF	SVN	Sacha Marasović (to (Slovenia) Tabor Sežana)
55	MF	CRO	Bernardo Matić (to (Kazakhstan) Ordabasy)
—	DF	CRO	Ante Bolanča (on loan to Hrvace, previously on loan at Zagora Unešić)

=== Istra 1961 ===
In:

No.	Pos.	Nation	Player
1	GK	CRO	Marijan Ćorić (from Opatija)
9	FW	CRO	Matej Vuk (from Rijeka)
15	FW	VEN	Darwin Matheus (from (United States) Atlanta United 2)
18	FW	SUI	Zoran Josipovic (from (Belarus) Dinamo Minsk)
20	DF	MDA	Iurie Iovu (from (Italy) Venezia, previously on loan)
27	MF	MTN	Abdallahi Mahmoud (reloan from (Spain) Alavés)
90	MF	ESP	Unai Naveira (on loan from (Spain) Athletic Bilbao B)

Out:

No.	Pos.	Nation	Player
1	GK	AUT	Ivan Lučić (to Hajduk Split)
3	DF	MKD	Filip Antovski (loan return to Austria Wien)
13	MF	ZAM	Prince Mumba (loan return to (Zambia) Kabwe Warriors)
25	GK	CHI	Gonzalo Collao (to (Chile) Palestino)
28	MF	CRO	Tino Blaž Lauš (loan return to Hajduk Split)
39	DF	CRO	Mauro Perković (on loan to Dinamo Zagreb)
95	FW	CRO	Vinko Petković (loan return to Osijek)
—	DF	NGA	Erhun Obanor (to (Greece) Proodeftiki)
—	FW	RUS	Serder Serderov (to (Uzbekistan) Sogdiana Jizzakh, previously on loan at (Kazakhstan) Aktobe)

=== Varaždin ===
In:

No.	Pos.	Nation	Player
9	FW	CRO	Domagoj Drožđek (from (South Korea) Busan IPark)
17	MF	MKD	Dimitar Mitrovski (from (North Macedonia) Akademija Pandev)
19	MF	CRO	Ivan Šaranić (on loan from Dinamo Zagreb, previously on loan at (Slovenia) Bravo)
21	GK	CRO	Josip Silić (from Dugopolje)
36	MF	POR	Rafa Pereira (from (Portugal) Vitória Guimarães B)

Out:

No.	Pos.	Nation	Player
3	DF	CRO	Filip Brekalo (loan return to Dinamo Zagreb)
10	MF	CRO	Ivan Posavec (to (Slovenia) Olimpija Ljubljana)
14	MF	CRO	Karlo Lusavec (on loan to Dugopolje)
17	MF	BIH	Demir Peco (to (Bosnia and Herzegovina) Sloga Meridian)
21	GK	CRO	Božidar Radošević (to Gorica)
31	MF	BIH	Mato Stanić (loan return to Rijeka)
32	DF	CRO	Matija Katanec (to (Romania) Politehnica Iași)
33	MF	CRO	Ivan Ćubelić (loan return to Hajduk Split)
—	MF	CRO	Bruno Bujan (on loan to Međimurje, previously on loan at Mladost Ždralovi)

== See also ==
- 2022–23 Croatian Football League
