= Dominik Kotarski =

Croatian footballer (born 2000)

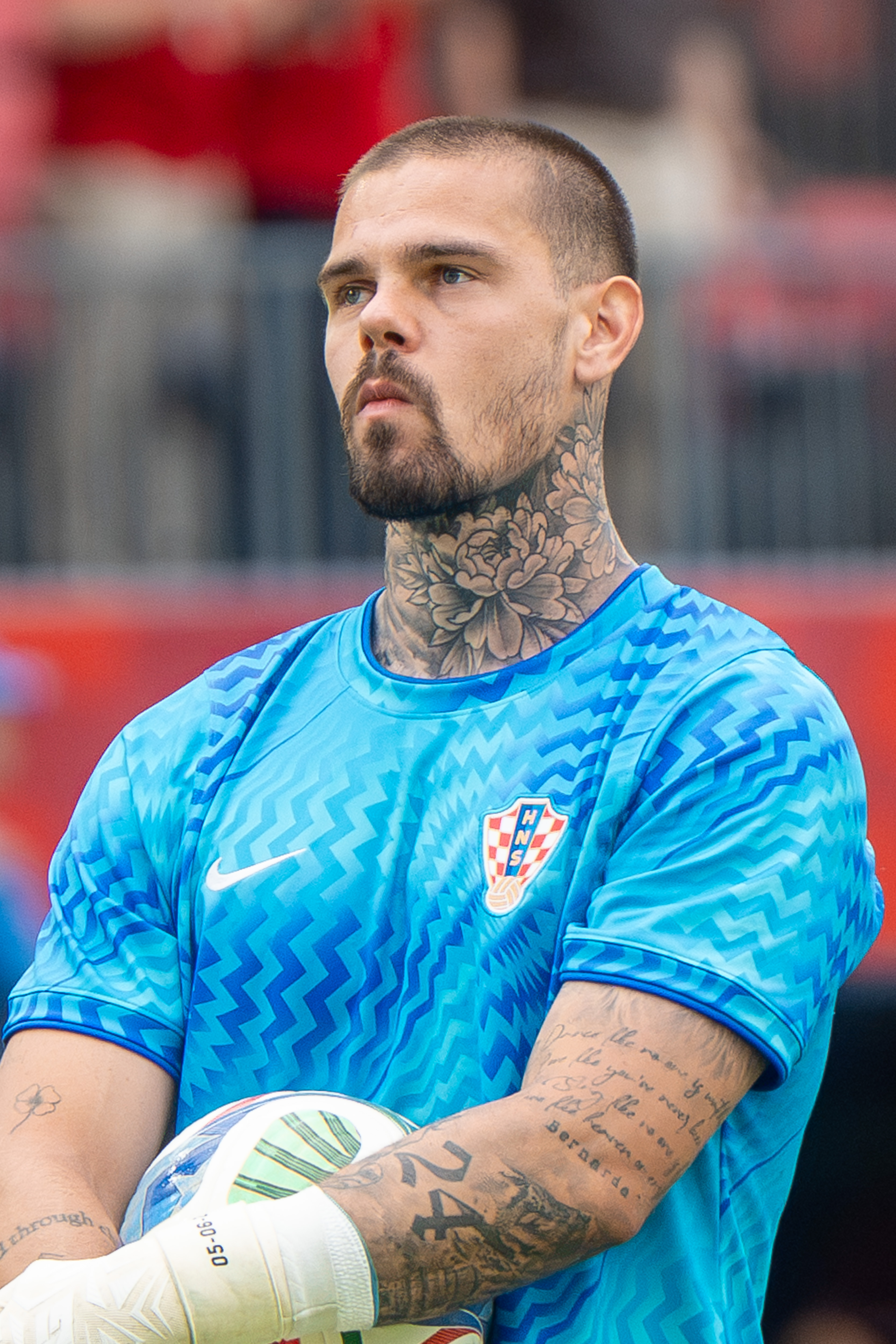
- Kotarski with Croatia in 2026

Personal information
- Date of birth: 10 February 2000 (age 26)
- Place of birth: Zabok, Croatia
- Height: 1.89 m (6 ft 2 in)
- Position: Goalkeeper

Team information
- Current team: Dinamo Zagreb (loan)
- Number: 24

Youth career
- 2006–2011: Tondach Bedekovčina
- 2011–2018: Dinamo Zagreb

Senior career*
Years	Team	Apps	(Gls)
2018–2021	Jong Ajax	60	(0)
2019–2022	Ajax	0	(0)
2021–2022	→ Gorica (loan)	24	(0)
2022–2025	PAOK	96	(0)
2025–	Copenhagen	33	(0)
2026–	→ Dinamo Zagreb (loan)	6	(0)

International career^{‡}
2014	Croatia U14	4	(0)
2015	Croatia U15	4	(0)
2015–2016	Croatia U16	14	(0)
2016–2017	Croatia U17	12	(0)
2018	Croatia U18	1	(0)
2018–2019	Croatia U19	7	(0)
2019	Croatia U20	1	(0)
2020–2023	Croatia U21	15	(0)
2024–	Croatia	4	(0)
- * Club domestic league appearances and goals as of 27 October 2026 (UTC) ‡ National team caps and goals as of 2 June 2026 (UTC)

Dominik Kotarski (Croatian pronunciation: [dôminik kôtarskiː, domǐ-]; born 10 February 2000) is a Croatian professional footballer who plays as a goalkeeper for Dinamo Zagreb, on loan from Danish Superliga club Copenhagen, and the Croatia national team.

== Club career ==
=== Ajax ===
Growing up in Brestovec Orehovički, Kotarski started training with his local club NK Tondach Bedekovčina at the age of 6. After impressing, he moved to Dinamo Zagreb's academy in 2011. On 7 July 2017, he signed his first professional contract with Ajax but had to wait until he turned 18 to officially sign with the club, and he is contracted until 30 June 2023.

Kotarski made his professional debut for Jong Ajax in a 3–0 Eerste Divisie loss to Jong PSV on 30 March 2018. Kotarski was made the third keeper of the first team ahead of the 2018–19 Eredivisie season. Due to good health of first and second choice keepers André Onana and Kostas Lamprou, he continued to ply his trade with the reserves.

==== Gorica (loan) ====
On 16 June 2021 it was announced that Kotarski would be loaned to HNK Gorica on a season-long loan spell, competing in the 1. HNL, the top-tier of professional football in his native Croatia. He featured 24 times in the league and 4 times in the cup, keeping a clean sheet in 8 of those matches.

=== PAOK ===
Οn 27 June 2022, Kotarski signed a four-year contract with Greek club PAOK.

=== FC Copenhagen ===
On 9 July 2025, Danish Superliga club F.C. Copenhagen announced the signing of Kotarski on a five-year deal. During the 2025-26 season Kotarski was the first-choice keeper for Copenhagen, when they finished 7th; their worst result since 1999.

==== Dinamo Zagreb (loan) ====
On 31 August 2026 it was announced that Kotarski would be loaned to Dinamo Zagreb on a season-long loan spell with an option to sign permanently.

== International career ==
Kotarski is a youth international for Croatia, and was the standout player for the Croatia U17s at the 2017 UEFA European Under-17 Championship.

On 31 October 2022, Kotarski was named in Croatia's preliminary 34-man squad for the 2022 FIFA World Cup, but did not make the final 26.

He made his debut on 26 March 2024 in a friendly against Egypt, substituting another debutant Nediljko Labrović at half-time.

On 18 May 2026, Kotarski was selected in the 26-man squad for the 2026 FIFA World Cup.

== Career statistics ==
=== Club ===
As of match played 27 October 2026

Appearances and goals by club, season and competition
Club	Season	League			National cup (Note: Includes Croatian Cup, Greek Cup)		Europe		Other		Total	
Club	Season	Division	Apps	Goals	Apps	Goals	Apps	Goals	Apps	Goals	Apps	Goals
Jong Ajax	2017–18	Eerste Divisie	4	0	—		—		—		4	0
Jong Ajax	2018–19	Eerste Divisie	30	0	—		—		—		30	0
Jong Ajax	2019–20	Eerste Divisie	13	0	—		—		—		13	0
Jong Ajax	2020–21	Eerste Divisie	13	0	—		—		—		13	0
Jong Ajax	Total		60	0	—		—		—		60	0
Gorica (loan)	2021–22	Prva HNL	24	0	4	0	—		—		28	0
PAOK	2022–23	Super League Greece	34	0	5	0	2 (Note: Appearances in UEFA Conference League)	0	—		41	0
PAOK	2023–24	Super League Greece	34	0	2	0	16	0	—		52	0
PAOK	2024–25	Super League Greece	28	0	2	0	16 (Note: Four appearances in UEFA Champions League, twelve appearances in UEFA Europa League)	0	—		46	0
PAOK	Total		96	0	9	0	34	0	—		139	0
Copenhagen	2025–26	Danish Superliga	30	0	6	0	14 (Note: Appearances in UEFA Champions League)	0	1 (Note: Appearance in Danish Superliga European play-off)	0	51	0
Copenhagen	2026–27	Danish Superliga	3	0	0	0	3	0	0	0	6	0
Copenhagen	Total		33	0	6	0	17	0	1	0	57	0
Dinamo Zagreb (loan)	2026–27	Croatian Football League	6	0	0	0	3 (Note: Appearances in UEFA Europa League)	0	—		9	0
Career total			219	0	19	0	54	0	1	0	293	0

=== International ===
As of match played 2 June 2026

Appearances and goals by national team and year
National team	Year	Apps	Goals
Croatia	2024	2	0
Croatia	2025	1	0
Croatia	2026	1	0
Total		4	0

== Honours ==
Jong Ajax

- Eerste Divisie: 2017–18

Ajax

- Eredivisie: 2018–19, 2020–21
- KNVB Cup: 2018–19, 2020–21

PAOK

- Super League Greece: 2023–24

Individual

- UEFA European Under-17 Championship Team of the Tournament: 2017
- Super League Greece Goalkeeper of the Season: 2023–24
- Super League Greece Team of the Season: 2023–24
