= Cheick Keita (footballer, born 1996) =

Footballer (born 1996)

Personal information
- Full name: Cheick Keita
- Date of birth: 16 April 1996 (age 30)
- Place of birth: Paris, France
- Height: 1.82 m (6 ft 0 in)
- Position: Left back

Team information
- Current team: Latina
- Number: 45

Youth career
- FC Solitaires
- Paris FC
- –2011: INF Clairefontaine
- 2011–2014: Monaco
- 2014–2015: Virtus Entella

Senior career*
Years	Team	Apps	(Gls)
2015–2017	Virtus Entella	45	(0)
2017–2020	Birmingham City	11	(0)
2017–2018	→ Bologna (loan)	3	(0)
2018–2019	→ Eupen (loan)	24	(2)
2021–2023	Gorica	43	(0)
2024–2025	L'Aquila	13	(1)
2025	Termoli	15	(2)
2025–2026	Vibonese	31	(0)
2026–	Latina	1	(0)

International career
	Mali U20	1	(0)
- * Club domestic league appearances and goals as of 29 August 2026

Cheick Keita (born 16 April 1996) is a professional footballer who plays as a left back for Italian Serie C Group B club Latina.

Keita began his senior career in Italy with Virtus Entella before joining English second-tier club Birmingham City in January 2017. He spent the 2017–18 Serie A season on loan to Bologna and the following season on loan to Belgian First Division A club Eupen, and was released by Birmingham at the end of the 2019–20 season. He joined Gorica in February 2021.

Born in France, Keita represented Mali at under-20 level and has been an unused substitute for the senior team.

== Early and personal life ==
Of Malian descent, Keita was born in 1996 in Paris, where he grew up in the Cité rouge area of the 19th arrondissement. A childhood friend, Mohamed Sylla, who became a rapper under the name of MHD, made reference to Keita in his song "Afro Trap Pt. 3 (Champions League)"; as of September 2021, its YouTube video had received more than 120 million views. Keita played football for a local youth team, FC Solitaires, before joining Paris FC. He was selected to attend INF Clairefontaine, and spent three years in Monaco's youth system before being released.

== Club career ==
=== Virtus Entella ===
After trials with French clubs failed to produce a contract, Keita joined the youth team of Italian second-tier club Virtus Entella. On 17 January 2015, he was an unused substitute in a Serie B match against Bari. Early the following season, on 12 September, the player made his senior debut in Serie B against A.C. Cesena at Stadio Comunale, playing the game as a starter under coach Alfredo Aglietti. He was shown a yellow card in the 32nd minute. On 24 October, Keita was sent off after 75 minutes of the match against Bari for receiving two yellow cards. He was again sent off on 26 March 2016 against Como, this time in stoppage time. He played 32 games (including a game in the Coppa Italia) and was shown eleven yellow cards and two red. After considerable transfer window interest from what website TuttoB.com dubbed "half of Serie A", Keita remained with Entella. He made 14 league appearances in the first half of the 2016–17 season, with only one yellow card.

=== Birmingham City ===
On 19 January 2017, Keita signed a three-and-a-half-year contract with Birmingham City of the EFL Championship (English second tier); the fee was undisclosed. According to manager Gianfranco Zola, "Everybody speaks very highly about him in Italy and a lot of teams were interested – we did very well to get him because everybody says he has got a big future." He made his debut on 4 February at home to Fulham, playing on the left of a makeshift back four, kept a clean sheet, and supplied the cross for Lukas Jutkiewicz's winning goal in what was judged a man-of-the-match performance. He continued in the struggling side for the next six matches – all defeats – until a knee injury forced him out. He was restored to the starting eleven in early April for the visit to league leaders Brighton & Hove Albion, but the Birmingham Mail's correspondent thought his forward-thinking nature made his selection too risky while the team remained in relegation danger. He finished the season with ten appearances as the team secured their Championship survival on the last day of the season. Keita was a second-half substitute in the opening match of the 2017–18 season, but picked up a groin injury that kept him out for a few weeks. Meanwhile, new manager Harry Redknapp signed Arsenal youngster Cohen Bramall on loan, and Bramall went straight into the starting eleven.

==== Loan moves ====
Keita returned to Italy to join Serie A club Bologna on loan for the 2017–18 season. He arrived with an adductor muscle injury that he expected to keep him out for two weeks, but remained under treatment for some considerable time longer, and did not take a full part in first-team training until well into November. After two appearances for the club's Primavera side, he was included in the squad for the Serie A match at home to Cagliari on 3 December, but remained unused. Keita finally made his Bologna and Serie A debut on 18 April 2018, away to Sampdoria, as a second-half substitute for regular left wing-back Adam Masina; he became the first Malian to play for the club. Head coach Roberto Donadoni said that he put Keita on rather than Ibrahima Mbaye because of his greater drive. Keita made his only start in his third and last appearance for Bologna, in a 3–1 defeat against top-of-the-table Juventus. He struggled against the trickery of Juan Cuadrado, and was unable to cover properly for Juventus' second goal because he was pushed by its scorer, Sami Khedira.

After left-back Kristian Pedersen became Birmingham's first signing of the 2018 summer transfer window, Keita joined Eupen of the Belgian First Division A on a season-long loan. In the visit to Mouscron that "pitted the league's worst defence against the worst attack", he scored the only goal – his first at senior level – when Silas Gnaka's shot was parried to his feet to give his team their first points of the season in their fifth match. He missed several weeks with a muscle injury before returning to the side after the October international break. He finished the season with 24 appearances.

==== Return to Birmingham ====
Keita remained with Birmingham City for the 2019–20 season. He was brought into the matchday squad as cover on the left wing for an FA Cup match against Coventry City in February 2020, but was not used, and kept his place on the bench for a couple of league matches. Head coach Pep Clotet described him as "a player that is very much his own player, he has his own way of seeing the game that you either take it or you don't take it." He was released when his contract expired at the end of the season.

=== Gorica ===
After training with Serie B leaders Salernitana, Keita signed an 18-month contract with Croatian First League club Gorica on 5 February 2021.

== International career ==
Keita was born in France of Malian descent. He represented Mali at under-20 level, and received his first call-up to the senior team in May 2016 for a friendly against Nigeria and an Africa Cup of Nations qualifier against South Sudan, but missed out through injury. Manager Alain Giresse selected him again for a World Cup qualifier against Gabon in November, but he remained an unused substitute.

== Career statistics ==
=== Club ===
As of match played 4 May 2025

Appearances and goals by club, season and competition
Club	Season	League			National cup (Note: Includes Coppa Italia, FA Cup, Belgian Cup, Croatian Cup)		League cup		Other		Total	
Club	Season	Division	Apps	Goals	Apps	Goals	Apps	Goals	Apps	Goals	Apps	Goals
Virtus Entella	2014–15	Serie B	0	0	0	0	—		—		0	0
Virtus Entella	2015–16	Serie B	31	0	1	0	—		—		32	0
Virtus Entella	2016–17	Serie B	14	0	2	0	—		—		16	0
Virtus Entella	Total		45	0	3	0	—		—		48	0
Birmingham City	2016–17	Championship	10	0	—		—		—		10	0
Birmingham City	2017–18	Championship	1	0	—		0	0	—		1	0
Birmingham City	2019–20	Championship	0	0	0	0	0	0	—		0	0
Birmingham City	Total		11	0	0	0	0	0	—		11	0
Bologna (loan)	2017–18	Serie A	3	0	—		—		—		3	0
Eupen (loan)	2018–19	First Division A	24	2	0	0	—		—		24	2
Gorica	2020–21	First League	9	0	1	0	—		—		10	0
Gorica	2021–22	First League	28	0	3	0	—		—		31	0
Gorica	2022–23	First League	6	0	1	0	—		—		7	0
Gorica	Total		43	0	5	0	—		—		48	0
L'Aquila	2024–25	Serie D	13	1	—		—		4 (Note: Appearances in Coppa Italia Serie D)	0	17	1
Termoli	2024–25	Serie D	15	2	—		—		—		15	2
Vibonese	2025–26	Serie D	33	0	—		—		—		33	0
Latina	2026–27	Serie C	0	0	—		—		—		0	0
Career total			227	7	8	0	0	0	4	0	166	5
