= Ivan Banić =

Croatian professional footballer (born 1994)

Personal information
- Date of birth: 18 July 1994 (age 32)
- Place of birth: Sinj, Croatia
- Height: 1.87 m (6 ft 2 in)
- Position: Goalkeeper

Team information
- Current team: Sarajevo
- Number: 31

Youth career
- 2002-2004: Junak Sinj
- 2004: Omladinac Vranjic
- 2004–2005: Junak Sinj
- 2005–2012: Hajduk Split

Senior career*
Years	Team	Apps	(Gls)
2012–2014	Hajduk Split	0	(0)
2012	→ Primorac Stobreč (loan)	2	(0)
2013	→ Hrvace (loan)	5	(0)
2013–2014	→ Primorac Stobreč (loan)	26	(0)
2014–2015	RNK Split	0	(0)
2014	→ Imotski (loan)	3	(0)
2015	→ Junak Sinj (loan)	17	(0)
2014–2016	Junak Sinj	51	(1)
2017–2018	Dugopolje	23	(0)
2018–2020	Rudeš	45	(0)
2020–2025	Gorica	119	(0)
2022	→ Olimpija Ljubljana (loan)	17	(0)
2025–	Sarajevo	39	(0)

International career
2010	Croatia U16	5	(0)
2010–2011	Croatia U17	12	(0)
2012	Croatia U18	2	(0)
2012	Croatia U19	1	(0)
- * Club domestic league appearances and goals as of 22 November 2026

Ivan Banić (born 14 May 1993) is a Croatian professional footballer who plays as a goalkeeper for Bosnian Premier League club Sarajevo.

== Club career ==
Originally from Otok near Sinj, Banić started playing football at NK Junak Sinj, before moving on to spend most of his football formation at the Hajduk Split academy After loans at Imotski and Primorac Stobreč, Banić moved to RNK Split, only to be loaned out from there again, to Imotski and Junak Sinj. After his contract expired, he stayed at Junak, playing in the third-tier of Croatian football, and established himself there, even scoring a goal against NK Solin in 2016.

Banić had his move to the second tier in early 2017, moving to NK Dugopolje, followed by a move to the Croatian top tier in the summer of 2018, playing for NK Rudeš. Following relegation, he remained a further season in the Zagreb-based club, before returning to the top flight to play with HNK Gorica. Banić moved abroad for the first time in early 2022, going on loan at Olimpija Ljubljana in Slovenia but returned at the end of the season, finding new form back in Croatia.he

== International ==
Banić was a Croatian youth international, with 20 caps for teams from U16 to U19 levels.

== Career statistics ==
=== Club ===
As of match played 22 November 2026

Appearances and goals by club, season and competition
Club	Season	League			National cup (Note: Includes Croatian Cup, Bosnian Cup)		Continental		Other		Total	
Club	Season	Division	Apps	Goals	Apps	Goals	Apps	Goals	Apps	Goals	Apps	Goals
Primorac Stobreč (loan)	2012–13	1. NL	2	0	—		—		—		2	0
Hrvace (loan)	2012–13	2. NL South	5	0	—		—		—		5	0
Primorac Stobreč (loan)	2013–14	2. NL South	26	0	—		—		—		26	0
Imotski (loan)	2014–15	1. NL	3	0	—		—		—		3	0
Junak Sinj (loan)	2014–15	2. NL South	17	0	—		—		—		17	0
Junak Sinj	2015–16	2. NL South	34	1	—		—		—		34	1
Junak Sinj	2016–17	2. NL South	17	0	—		—		—		17	0
Junak Sinj	Total		68	1	—		—		—		68	1
Dugopolje	2016–17	1. NL	1	0	—		—		—		1	0
Dugopolje	2017–18	1. NL	22	0	—		—		—		22	0
Dugopolje	Total		23	0	—		—		—		23	0
Rudeš	2018–19	Croatian Football League	26	0	—		—		—		26	0
Rudeš	2019–20	1. NL	19	0	0	0	—		—		19	0
Rudeš	Total		45	0	0	0	—		—		45	0
Gorica	2020–21	Croatian Football League	22	0	3	0	—		—		25	0
Gorica	2021–22	Croatian Football League	11	0	0	0	—		—		11	0
Gorica	2022–23	Croatian Football League	26	0	1	0	—		—		27	0
Gorica	2023–24	Croatian Football League	33	0	—		—		—		33	0
Gorica	2024–25	Croatian Football League	27	0	0	0	—		—		27	0
Gorica	Total		119	0	4	0	—		—		123	0
Olimpija Ljubljana (loan)	2021–22	Slovenian PrvaLiga	17	0	—		—		—		17	0
Sarajevo	2025–26	Bosnian Premier League	25	0	3	0	2 (Note: Appearances in UEFA Conference League)	0	1 (Note: Appearance in Bosnian Supercup)	0	31	0
Sarajevo	2026–27	Bosnian Premier League	14	0	0	0	2	0	—		16	0
Sarajevo	Total		39	0	3	0	4	0	1	0	47	0
Career total			347	1	7	0	4	0	1	0	359	1
