= Martin Šroler =

Croatian association football player

Personal information
- Date of birth: 2 November 1998 (age 28)
- Place of birth: Zagreb, Croatia
- Height: 1.75 m (5 ft 9 in)
- Positions: Attacking midfielder; winger

Team information
- Current team: Posušje
- Number: 8

Youth career
- 2004–2007: Velika Mlaka
- 2007–2009: Zagreb
- 2009–2013: Velika Mlaka
- 2013–2015: Gorica
- 2015–2017: Udarnik Kurilovec
- 2017: Koper

Senior career*
Years	Team	Apps	(Gls)
2017	Koper	1	(0)
2017–2018	Gorica II	18	(12)
2018–2022	Gorica	30	(0)
2020	→ Sesvete (loan)	3	(0)
2020–2021	→ Inter Zaprešić (loan)	32	(9)
2022	Alumnij	14	(4)
2022–2023	Mura	29	(2)
2023–2024	Gorica	4	(0)
2024	Kustošija	14	(5)
2025–2026	Bunyodkor	28	(2)
2026–	Posušje	11	(0)
- * Club domestic league appearances and goals as of 12 June 2026

Martin Šroler (born 2 November 1998) is a Croatian professional footballer who plays as an attacking midfielder or winger for Bosnian club Posušje.

== Club career ==
On 23 May 2022, Šroler signed a contract with NŠ Mura until the summer of 2025. On 27 July 2023, Šroler returned to his previous club, Gorica, signing a three-year contract.
