= Vlatko Stojanovski =

Macedonian footballer (born 1997)

Personal information
- Full name: Vlatko Stojanovski
- Date of birth: 23 April 1997 (age 29)
- Place of birth: Delčevo, Macedonia
- Height: 1.86 m (6 ft 1 in)
- Position: Striker

Team information
- Current team: Mash'al
- Number: 7

Youth career
- Metalurg Skopje

Senior career*
Years	Team	Apps	(Gls)
2014–2016	Metalurg Skopje	38	(6)
2016–2017	RNK Split	0	(0)
2017	→ Neretvanac (loan)	11	(2)
2017–2018	Dugopolje	16	(4)
2018–2019	Renova	47	(22)
2019–2021	Nîmes	6	(0)
2019–2020	Nîmes B	4	(0)
2020–2021	→ Chambly (loan)	11	(0)
2021–2022	HNK Gorica	23	(2)
2022–2023	Shkëndija	14	(2)
2023	Septemvri Sofia	8	(0)
2023–2024	Rabotnički	22	(2)
2025–2026	Besa	11	(3)
2026–	Mash'al	8	(1)

International career
2015	North Macedonia U18	1	(0)
2017	North Macedonia U21	1	(0)
2019–2022	North Macedonia	10	(2)
- * Club domestic league appearances and goals as of 29 July 2026

Vlatko Stojanovski (Macedonian: Влатко Стојановски; born 23 April 1997) is a Macedonian professional footballer who plays as a striker for Uzbekistan Super League club Mash'al.

== Club career ==
A youth academy graduate of Metalurg Skopje, Stojanovski made his professional debut on 29 October 2014 in a 2–1 loss against Shkëndija. On 29 August 2015, he scored his first professional goal in a 2–1 loss against Mladost CD.

Stojanovski scored four goals in Renova's 9–1 league win against Pobeda on 4 May 2019. He finished 2018–19 season as the top scorer in Macedonian top division.

On 3 July 2019, French Ligue 1 club Nîmes Olympique announced the signing of Stojanovski on a three-year deal.

On 12 February 2026 Mash'al Mubarek announced the signing of Stojanovski on a one-year deal.

== International career ==
He made his senior debut for North Macedonia in a November 2019 European Championship qualification match against Austria, in which he immediately scored his first international goal.

== Career statistics ==
=== International ===
As of 22 October 2022

Appearances and goals by national team and year
National team	Year	Apps	Goals
North Macedonia	2019	2	1
North Macedonia	2020	4	1
North Macedonia	2021	3	0
North Macedonia	2022	1	0
Total		10	2

Scores and results list North Macedonia's goal tally first, score column indicates score after each Stojanovski goal.

List of international goals scored by Vlatko Stojanovski
No.	Date	Venue	Cap	Opponent	Score	Result	Competition
1	16 November 2019	Ernst Happel Stadium, Vienna, Austria	1	Austria	1–2	1–2	UEFA Euro 2020 qualification
2	15 November 2020	Toše Proeski Arena, Skopje, North Macedonia	5	Estonia	2–1	2–1	2020–21 UEFA Nations League C
