= Krešimir Krizmanić =

Croatian footballer

Personal information
- Date of birth: 3 July 2000 (age 26)
- Place of birth: Zagreb, Croatia
- Height: 1.88 m (6 ft 2 in)
- Position: Defender

Team information
- Current team: OFI
- Number: 2

Youth career
- 2007-2011: Udarnik Kurilovec
- 2011-2012: Hrvatski Dragovoljac
- 2012-2019: Gorica

Senior career*
Years	Team	Apps	(Gls)
2017–2018	Gorica II	18	(2)
2018–2025	Gorica	160	(2)
2025–	OFI	33	(0)

International career
2019	Croatia U20	1	(0)
2020–2023	Croatia U21	9	(0)
- * Club domestic league appearances and goals as of 20 September 2026

Krešimir Krizmanić (born 3 July 2000) is a Croatian professional footballer who plays as a defender for Greek Super League club OFI.

== Club career ==
Krizmanić started training football at an early age at Udarnik Kurilovec in his native Velika Gorica, before moving, at the age of 11, for a season, to NK Hrvatski Dragovoljac. The following season, he joined the HNK Gorica academy. At the age of 17, he played for the club's fourth-tier reserve team. He made his professional debut with Gorica in a 3–2 Croatian First Football League win over NK Lokomotiva on 26 May 2019.

== International career ==
Krizmanić was born in Croatia, and was called up to represent the Croatia U21 at the 2021 UEFA European Under-21 Championship.

== Career statistics ==
As of 20:17, 26 April 2026

Club	Season	League			Cup		Continental		Other		Total	
Club	Season	Division	Apps	Goals	Apps	Goals	Apps	Goals	Apps	Goals	Apps	Goals
Gorica	2017–18	Druga HNL	1	0	—		—		—		1	0
Gorica	2018–19	Prva HNL	1	0	—		—		—		1	0
Gorica	2019–20	Prva HNL	11	0	3	0	—		—		14	0
Gorica	2020–21	Prva HNL	28	0	4	0	—		—		32	0
Gorica	2021–22	Prva HNL	25	0	2	0	—		—		27	0
Gorica	2022–23	Prva HNL	33	0	1	0	—		—		34	0
Gorica	2023–24	Prva HNL	29	0	2	1	—		—		31	1
Gorica	2024–25	Prva HNL	32	2	3	0	—		—		35	2
Gorica	Total		160	2	15	1	—		—		175	3
OFI	2025–26	Superleague Greece	25	0	6	0	—		1	0	32	0
Career total			185	1	21	1	0	0	1	0	207	3

== Honours ==
OFI

- Greek Cup: 2025–26
- Greek Super Cup: 2026
