= Caio Da Cruz =

Brazilian footballer (born 2002)

Personal information
- Full name: Caio Da Cruz Oliveira Queiroz
- Date of birth: 13 March 2002 (age 24)
- Place of birth: Serra, Brazil
- Position: Forward

Team information
- Current team: Sesvete (on loan from Gorica)
- Number: 28

Youth career
- Rio Branco de Barcelona
- –2019: Porto Vitória FC
- 2019: Vasco da Gama
- 2019–2021: Porto Vitória FC
- 2021: Gorica

Senior career*
Years	Team	Apps	(Gls)
2021–	Gorica	28	(2)
2021	→ Kurilovec (loan)	7	(5)
2023	→ Dugopolje (loan)	16	(0)
2023–2024	→ Radomlje (loan)	30	(2)
2024–	→ Sesvete (loan)	14	(0)
- * Club domestic league appearances and goals as of 15 December 2024

Caio Da Cruz Oliveira Queiroz (born 13 March 2002) is a Brazilian professional footballer who plays as a forward for Sesvete, on loan from Gorica of the Croatian Football League.

== Career ==
Nine months after signing a contract with Croatian side Gorica until the summer of 2023, Caio Da Cruz impressed with his performances and extended his contract to the summer of 2025.
