= Stadion Radnik =

Association football stadium in Velika Gorica, Croatia

Coordinates: 45.7240°N 16.0732°E

Gradski stadion Velika Gorica
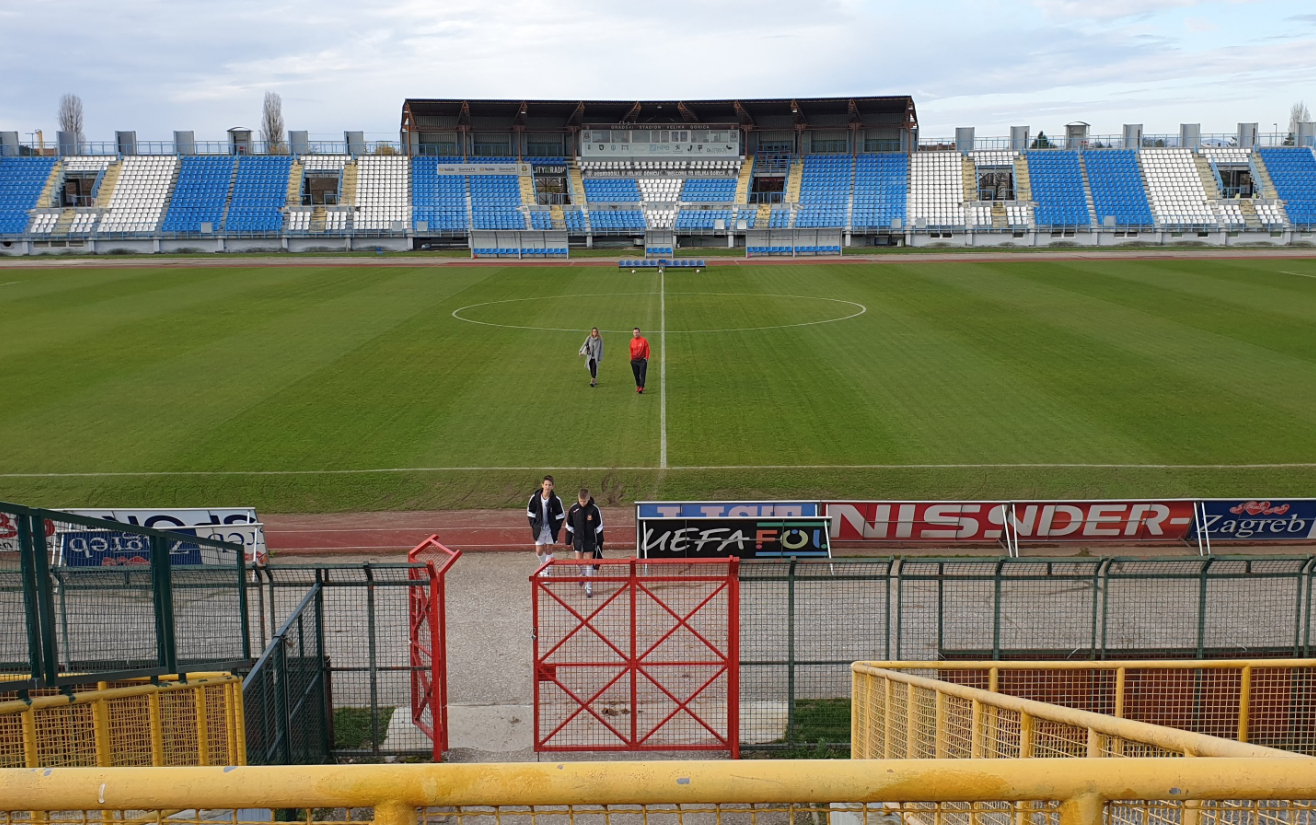
- Interactive map of Gradski stadion Velika Gorica
- Full name: ŠRC Velika Gorica - Gradski stadion
- Location: Velika Gorica, Croatia
- Owner: City of Velika Gorica
- Capacity: 8,000
- Surface: Grass
- Scoreboard: Yes
- Field size: 100x65

Construction
- Built: 1987
- Renovated: 1999, 2010, 2019, 2025

Tenants
- NK Radnik (1987–2009); HNK Gorica (2009–present); Croatia U21s (2004–present)

Gradski Stadion Velika Gorica (Croatian pronunciation: [grǎtskiː stâdijoːn ʋêlikaː gǒrit͡sa]), also known as Stadion ŠRC Velika Gorica, is an association football stadium in Velika Gorica, Croatia. It is the home stadium of HNK Gorica. The stadium has a capacity of 8,000, all of which is seated.

The stadium was built for the 1987 Summer Universiade, held in the nearby Croatian capital Zagreb. It has since been renovated three times, in 1999 for the Military World Games held in Zagreb, in 2010 to meet the requirements for Druga HNL Croatian second-level league and finally in 2019 when the stadium became an all-seater.

The stadium also sought use for concerts such as:

- August 18, 1990 - Tina Turner on Foreign Affair: The Farewell Tour.
- July 17, 2003 - Iron Maiden with their Give Me Ed... 'Til I'm Dead Tour.
- July 14, 2006 - Shakira and her Oral Fixation Tour.

== Gallery ==
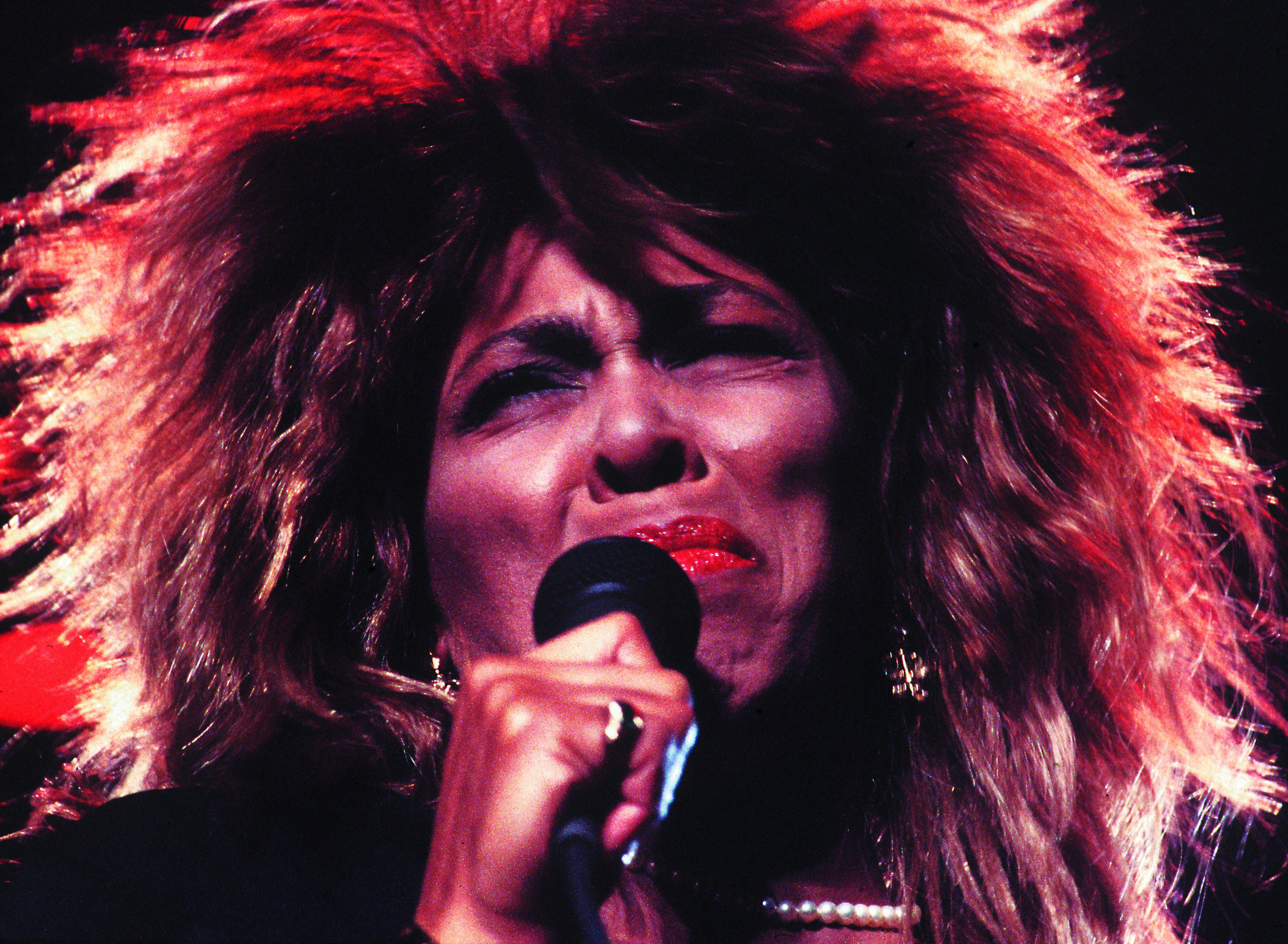
Tina Turner performing on Gradski stadion, 1990

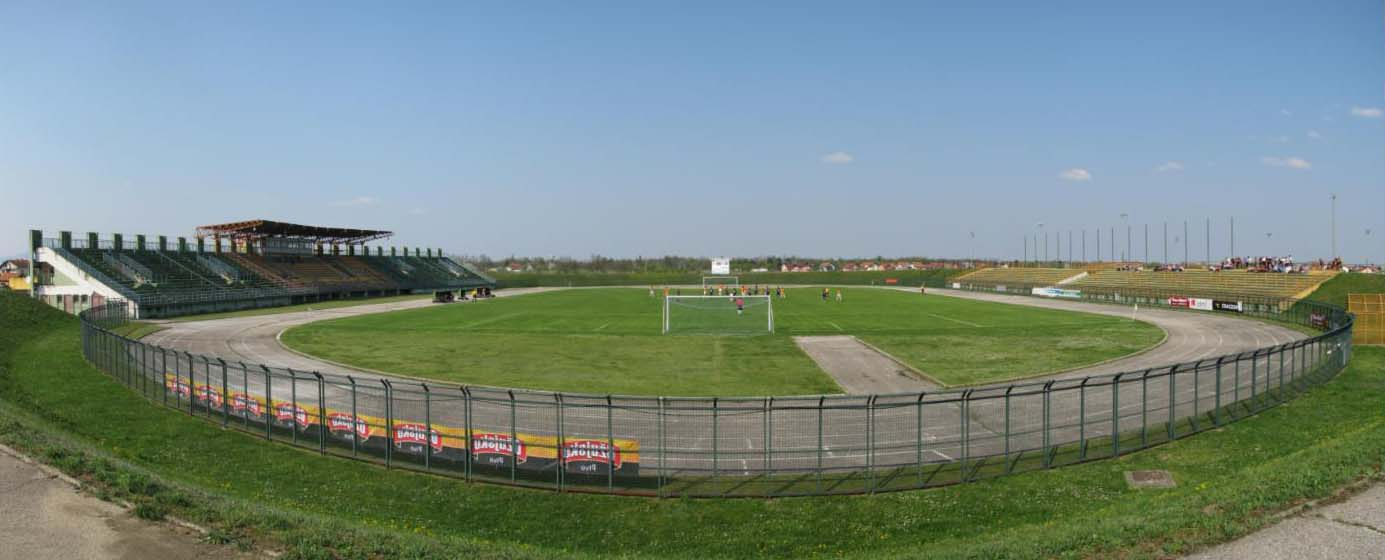
Panorama
