= Nasiru Moro =

Ghanaian footballer

Personal information
- Date of birth: 24 September 1996 (age 30)
- Place of birth: Accra, Ghana
- Height: 1.88 m (6 ft 2 in)
- Position: Central defender

Team information
- Current team: Degerfors
- Number: 15

Senior career*
Years	Team	Apps	(Gls)
2016–2019	Accra Lions FC	58	(?)
2018–2019	→ HNK Gorica (loan)	5	(0)
2019–2021	HNK Gorica	17	(1)
2019–2020	→ Sesvete (loan)	16	(0)
2021–2023	Örebro	47	(1)
2024–	Degerfors	37	(2)
- * Club domestic league appearances and goals as of 8 July 2026

Nasiru Moro (born 24 September 1996) is a Ghanaian professional footballer who plays for Swedish club Degerfors.

== Club career ==
=== HNK Gorica ===
Nasiru Moro went on loan to HNK Gorica on 31 August 2018. On 21 October 2018, he made his professional debut in the Croatian First Football League against Slaven Belupo. He later completed a permanent transfer to the club, signing a three-year deal until 2022.

=== Örebro SK ===
On 27 July 2021, Moro signed for Allsvenskan club Örebro on a two-and-a-half-year deal, until the end of the 2023 season.

=== Degerfors IF ===
In February 2024, Moro joined Superettan club Degerfors as a free agent on a two-year contract.
