= Saša Marjanović (footballer, born 2002) =

Bosnian footballer

Personal information
- Full name: Saša Marjanović
- Date of birth: 5 February 2002 (age 24)
- Place of birth: Banja Luka, Bosnia and Herzegovina
- Height: 1.93 m (6 ft 4 in)
- Position: Centre-back

Youth career
- Željezničar Banja Luka

Senior career*
Years	Team	Apps	(Gls)
2020	Željezničar Banja Luka		
2021	Inter Zaprešić	13	(1)
2021–2022	Gorica	6	(1)
2023–2025	Zemplín Michalovce	30	(1)

International career^{‡}
2021–2022	Bosnia and Herzegovina U21	4	(0)
- * Club domestic league appearances and goals as of 17 July 2025 ‡ National team caps and goals as of 3 June 2022

Saša Marjanović (born 5 February 2002) is a Bosnian professional footballer.

== Club career ==
=== MFK Zemplín Michalovce ===
Marjanović made his Slovak league debut for Zemplín Michalovce in an away fixture against MFK Ružomberok on 11 February 2023.
