= Matthew Steenvoorden =

Dutch footballer (born 1993)

Personal information
- Full name: Matthew Rudolf Maria Steenvoorden
- Date of birth: 9 January 1993 (age 33)
- Place of birth: Leidschendam, Netherlands
- Height: 1.88 m (6 ft 2 in)
- Position: Centre-back

Team information
- Current team: HHC Hardenberg
- Number: 4

Youth career
- DEVJO
- Forum Sport
- Feyenoord

Senior career*
Years	Team	Apps	(Gls)
2012–2015	Feyenoord	1	(0)
2012–2013	→ Excelsior (loan)	29	(1)
2013–2015	→ Dordrecht (loan)	26	(0)
2015–2016	Dordrecht	19	(0)
2016–2019	Cambuur	76	(11)
2019–2023	Gorica	98	(3)
2023	Pakhtakor	6	(0)
2024	Terengganu	4	(0)
2024–2025	Gorica	16	(0)
2025–	HHC Hardenberg	15	(2)

International career
2008	Netherlands U16	3	(0)
2011–2012	Netherlands U19	8	(1)
- * Club domestic league appearances and goals as of 13 December 2025

Matthew Rudolf Maria Steenvoorden (born 9 January 1993) is a Dutch professional footballer who plays as a centre-back for Tweede Divisie club HHC Hardenberg. He formerly played for Feyenoord, Excelsior and Dordrecht. Besides the Netherlands, he has played in Croatia.

== Personal life ==
The Feyenoord graduate claimed to have Indonesian blood from his grandfather who came from Central Java, precisely in Semarang. "I have Indonesian blood from my grandfather. He was born in Semarang. I want to help the national team and make my family proud," said Matthew Steenvoorden.

== International career ==
Steenvoorden played in the youth national team of the Netherlands U19 in 2011–2012.

== Club career ==
On 28 July 2023, he signed a 1.5-year contract with the Pakhtakor club of the Uzbekistan Super League.

Terengganu

On 15 February 2024, Matthew signed a contract with Malaysia Football League club Terengganu.
