= Josip Mitrović =

Croatian footballer (born 2000)

Personal information
- Date of birth: 11 June 2000 (age 26)
- Place of birth: Osijek, Croatia
- Height: 1.86 m (6 ft 1 in)
- Position: Winger

Team information
- Current team: Slaven Belupo
- Number: 11

Youth career
- –2016: HNK Cibalia
- 2016–2019: HNK Rijeka

Senior career*
Years	Team	Apps	(Gls)
2018–2020	HNK Rijeka	0	(0)
2019–2020	→ NK Inter Zaprešić (loan)	27	(1)
2020–2024	HNK Gorica	120	(13)
2024–2025	Fortuna Sittard	26	(2)
2025–	Slaven Belupo	30	(8)

International career
2016–2017	Croatia U17	12	(1)
2018–2019	Croatia U19	6	(1)
2019	Croatia U20	1	(0)
2021	Croatia U21	1	(0)
- * Club domestic league appearances and goals as of 15 June 2026

Josip Mitrović (born 11 June 2000) is a Croatian footballer who plays as a winger for Slaven Belupo.

== Life and career ==
As a youth player, he joined the youth academy of Croatian side HNK Cibalia. In 2016, he joined the youth academy of Croatian side HNK Rijeka. He started his senior career with Croatian side HNK Rijeka. On 26 September 2018, he debuted for the club during a 9–0 win over NK Radnik Križevci. In 2019, he was sent on loan to Croatian side NK Inter Zaprešić. He made twenty-seven league appearances and scored one goal while playing for the club.

In 2020, he signed for Croatian side HNK Gorica. He made one hundred and twenty league appearances and scored thirteen goals while playing for the club. In 2024, he signed for Dutch side Fortuna Sittard. He chose the number twenty-eight after signing for the club.

He was a Croatia youth international. He played for the Croatia national under-17 football team, Croatia national under-19 football team, Croatia national under-20 football team and Croatia national under-21 football team.

He was born on 11 June 2000 in Osijek, Croatia. He is a native of Đakovo, Croatia. He has been married.

== Style of play ==
His main position is as a winger. He can operate as a right-winger and left-winger. He can also operate as an attacking midfielder. He has played as a right-back while playing for Croatian side HNK Gorica.
