= Joey Suk =

Dutch footballer (born 1990)

Personal information
- Date of birth: 8 July 1989 (age 37)
- Place of birth: Deventer, Netherlands
- Height: 1.85 m (6 ft 1 in)
- Position: Midfielder

Youth career
- DVV Davo
- Go Ahead Eagles

Senior career*
Years	Team	Apps	(Gls)
2009–2013	Go Ahead Eagles	102	(23)
2013	Beerschot	11	(0)
2013–2016	NAC Breda	65	(10)
2016–2018	Go Ahead Eagles	53	(3)
2018–2023	Gorica	118	(12)
2023–2024	Karmiotissa	20	(2)
- * Club domestic league appearances and goals as of 6 February 2024

Joey Suk (born 8 July 1989) is a Dutch professional footballer who plays as a midfielder. Besides the Netherlands, he has played in Croatia.

== Early life ==
Suk was born in Deventer, Overijssel, a town in eastern Netherlands.

== Club career ==
Suk started his career at local Deventer club DVV Davo. He was picked up by Deventer's only professional club, Go Ahead Eagles as a youth player.

Suk made his league debut on 6 February 2009, in Go Ahead Eagles' away-match against FC Omniworld. Surprisingly, he was in the starting lineup and stayed there until the end of the match. The game ended 2–1 for the Eagles.

The following season, he became a regular for the Deventer side, featuring in 22 matches and scoring four goals. This created interest from several unnamed clubs.

On 5 January 2013, Suk signed with Beerschot until the summer of 2016. However, after Beerschot's bankruptcy Suk became without a club.

On 14 June 2014, Suk signed a three-year contract with NAC Breda. In his first season, Suk relegated to the Eerste Divisie.

On 13 June 2016, Suk returned to his former club Go Ahead Eagles on a free transfer, despite his contract with NAC Breda officially terminated in mid 2017.

== International career ==
As recently the Football Association of Indonesia had called some of the players overseas to play for Indonesia. Suk, with his teammate Diego Michiels, was called to join Indonesia U23 in 2012 AFC Men's Pre-Olympic Tournament against Turkmenistan U23. But, due to their Indonesian citizenship haven't done yet, they can only play for the second leg in Ashkhabad, Turkmenistan, 9 March 2011. His citizenship is finally done on 7 April 2011. Joey, along with the other two naturalized players, will be able to play for Indonesia in 2011 SEA Games.

However, the naturalization process involving Joey Suk was never completed. He was not called up to represent the Indonesia national team and did not make any appearances for the side. As a result, the process remained inactive and was not pursued further.

== Trivia ==
Suk has two tattoos; one which shows his love for his hometown Deventer, and one on his back, that shows a cross with angel wings and his name, Joey Suk, above.
