= Siniša Oreščanin =

Croatian association football manager

Personal information
- Date of birth: 30 July 1972 (age 54)
- Place of birth: Zagreb, SR Croatia, SFR Yugoslavia
- Position: Midfielder

Youth career
- Dinamo Zagreb

Senior career*
Years	Team	Apps	(Gls)
1991–1993	Radnik Sesvete		
1994–1995	Ljubuški		
1995–1996	Dugo Selo		
1996–1998	TŠK		
1999	Sloga Uskoplje		
2000–2001	ZET		
2001–2002	Sesvetski Kraljevec		
2002–2003	Maksimir		
2003–2005	Lučko		
2005–2006	Maksimir		

Managerial career
- 1999–2007: NK Sesvete (youth and senior)
- 2007–2009: NK Zagreb (youth)
- 2009–2015: Dinamo Zagreb (youth)
- 2015: Dugo Selo
- 2015–2016: Al-Nassr (youth)
- 2016–2017: Hajduk Split U17
- 2017–2018: Hajduk Split II
- 2018–2019: Hajduk Split
- 2021: Gorica
- 2023–: Croatia U19
- * Club domestic league appearances and goals

Siniša Oreščanin (born 30 July 1972) is a Croatian professional football manager and former player who was recently the manager of Prva HNL club Gorica.

== Playing career ==
Oreščanin started his football career at a younger age in cadets and juniors at Dinamo Zagreb as a central midfielder, and spent his senior career at several lower league clubs in Zagreb and the surrounding area. He also played for Croatian clubs from Bosnia and Herzegovina for a while. On three occasions, he played for NK Maksimir and besides it, he played for NK Sesvete, Dugo Selo, ZET, TŠK, Sesvetski Kraljevec and Lučko, and during the 1990s he played for HNK Ljubuški and Sloga Uskoplje in the First League of Herzeg-Bosnia. Playing for Ljubuški he also won two Herceg-Bosnia Cup titles. He ended his playing career in 2006 as the captain of Maksimir.

== Managerial career ==
Oreščanin started his coaching career as an active player, working in Sesvete from 1999 to 2007. During this time he worked as a junior coach, manager of football academy and first team coach. After six years in junior section, in 2006, he got the opportunity to lead the first team and remained at the helm of the team until 2007.

=== Dinamo Zagreb (youth) ===
After Sesvete, he went to NK Zagreb to coach the young players, where he stayed for two years before leaving for Dinamo Zagreb, with which he achieved remarkable results in five years of work. From 2009 to 2014, the young generations of Dinamo achieved great results, both domestically and internationally. In addition to winning several national championships, they also achieved great results at the Manchester United Premier Cup, a competition considered by many to be the strongest in that age category globally, winning the second place in Europe and the sixth in the world. In his several years of work at Dinamo, numerous young and later senior national team players passed through his hands.

In parallel with his work at Dinamo from 2010 to 2011, he was hired as coach in Croatian national teams up to 14 and 15 years old.

After leaving Dinamo, in 2015 he led the first team of Dugo Selo. He went to Saudi Arabia and worked there at one of the biggest clubs, Al Nassr, as the coach of the under-19 team with which he won the Cup winner title and the second place in the Championship.

=== Hajduk Split ===
Following his spell in Saudi Arabia, he moved to Split at the invitation of Krešimir Gojun, head of the Hajduk Split Academy. He first worked as a cadet coach before being appointed manager of the club's second team, which he led in the Druga HNL. During his tenure he gave playing time to a number of young players, several of whom went on to secure places in Hajduk's first team and later transferred to clubs abroad.

After a very poor Hajduk's starting the season under the leadership of Željko Kopić, the first team of Hajduk was taken over by Zoran Vulić, but he also failed to significantly improve the situation, so the management of the club decided to make another change and on 27 November 2018, Oreščanin was appointed manager.

He took the team left in a very difficult situation, in the sixth place in the championship ranking, far from the positions leading to the European competitions, and he placed the ranking among the top four as a goal before the leaders of Hajduk. Under his leadership, Hajduk experienced a rebirth, joining the fight for the second position, and in his only complete half-season on the Hajduk bench, only Dinamo won more points than his team.

The team's great games also resulted in higher prices for some players, so his tenure will remain marked by the sales of two young footballers whose career originated from Poljud, under his leadership; Ante Palaversa was sold to Manchester City and Domagoj Bradarić to Lille. Oreščanin's Hajduk was adorned with a great game, with Mijo Caktaš imposing himself as the creator, who exploded in the second part of the season after only three goals in the first part of the season and won the title of the top scorer of the Croatian First League, whose numerous attributes were owned precisely to Oreščanin's style of play.

He was dismissed as Hajduk coach on 19 July 2019 as a victim of inner fights in the club, following the shocking elimination of Hajduk by Maltese side Gzira United in the 2019–20 UEFA Europa League first qualifying round.

In the Hajduk history books, Oreščanin will remain inscribed as the coach with the best average points earned in the Croatian First League since independence.

=== Gorica ===
On 3 January 2021, Oreščanin took over Croatian top division side HNK Gorica as head coach.

On 24 May 2021 after Gorica failed to secure a spot in the 2021–22 Europa Conference League second qualifying round through the national championship, Oreščanin was sacked by the club together with his assistant, Goran Rosanda.

== Managerial statistics ==
As of 22 May 2021

Team	From	To	Record				
Team	From	To	G	W	D	L	Win %
Hajduk Split	27 November 2018	19 July 2019	24	15	3	6	62.50
Gorica	3 January 2021	24 May 2021	24	9	6	9	37.50
Total			48	24	9	15	50.00
