= Younes Delfi =

Iranian footballer

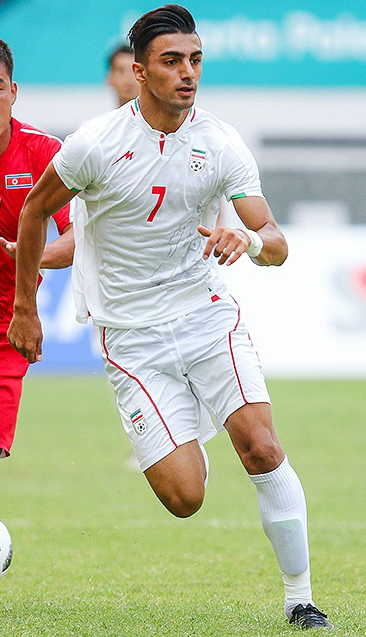
- Delfi with Iran U23 at 2018 Asian Games

Personal information
- Full name: Mohammad Younes Delfi
- Date of birth: 2 October 2000 (age 26)
- Place of birth: Shush, Iran
- Height: 1.84 m (6 ft 0 in)
- Positions: Forward; winger

Team information
- Current team: Shams Azar
- Number: 70

Youth career
- 2010–2016: Esteghlal Khuzestan

Senior career*
| Years | Team | Apps | (Gls) |
| 2016–2019 | Esteghlal Khuzestan | 39 | (7) |
| 2019–2022 | Charleroi | 6 | (1) |
| 2020–2022 | → HNK Gorica (loan) | 26 | (3) |
| 2022–2023 | Foolad | 3 | (0) |
| 2023–2024 | Gol Gohar Sirjan | 0 | (0) |
| 2024–2026 | Nirooye Zamini | 34 | (8) |
| 2026– | Shams Azar | 0 | (0) |

International career^{‡}
| 2016–2017 | Iran U17 | 13 | (6) |
| 2018–2019 | Iran U23 | 13 | (1) |
- * Club domestic league appearances and goals as of 10 March 2026 ‡ National team caps and goals as of 21 November 2019

Younes Delfi (Persian: یونس دلفی; born 2 October 2000) is an Iranian professional footballer who plays as a forward for Persian Gulf Pro League club Shams Azar. He is the youngest Iranian player to have played in Europe.

== International career ==
Delfi is a very technical player displaying his talent initially at the 2017 FIFA U-17 World Cup in India. He made an early impact in the competition, recording two goals and one assist during the group stage matches. He also contributed to the team's attacking play by earning two penalties for the Iran under-17 national team across the three group-stage fixtures.

| Year | Competition | Performance | |
| Year | Competition | Apps | Goals |
|---|---|---|---|
| 2016 | AFC U-16 Championship | 3 | 0 |
| 2017 | Granatkin Memorial | 6 | 4 |
| 2017 | FIFA U-17 World Cup | 4 | 2 |
| 2018 | Asian Games | 3 | 0 |

== Career statistics ==
As of 12 June 2022

| Club | Division | Season | League | | Cup | | Other | | Total | |
| Club | Division | Season | Apps | Goals | Apps | Goals | Apps | Goals | Apps | Goals |
|---|---|---|---|---|---|---|---|---|---|---|
| Esteghlal Khuzestan | Persian Gulf Pro League | 2016–17 | 6 | 0 | 0 | 0 | — | | 6 | 0 |
| Esteghlal Khuzestan | Persian Gulf Pro League | 2017–18 | 24 | 7 | 2 | 0 | — | | 26 | 7 |
| Esteghlal Khuzestan | Persian Gulf Pro League | 2018–19 | 9 | 0 | 2 | 0 | — | | 11 | 0 |
| Esteghlal Khuzestan | Total | | 39 | 7 | 4 | 0 | — | | 43 | 7 |
| Charleroi | Belgian First Division A | 2018–19 | 5 | 1 | 0 | 0 | — | | 5 | 1 |
| Charleroi | Belgian First Division A | 2019–20 | 0 | 0 | 0 | 0 | — | | 0 | 0 |
| HNK Gorica (loan) | Croatian First Football League | 2020-21 | 5 | 2 | 0 | 0 | — | | 5 | 2 |
| HNK Gorica (loan) | Croatian First Football League | 2021-22 | 21 | 1 | 1 | 0 | — | | 22 | 1 |
| Foolad | Persian Gulf Pro League | 2022-23 | 3 | 0 | 0 | 0 | - | - | 3 | 0 |
| Career total | | | 73 | 4 | 1 | 0 | — | | 78 | 11 |

== Honours ==
=== National ===
Iran U17

- AFC U-16 Championship - Runner-up (1): 2016
