= Jurica Pršir =

Croatian footballer (born 2000)

Personal information
- Date of birth: 29 May 2000 (age 26)
- Place of birth: Zagreb, Croatia
- Height: 1.80 m (5 ft 11 in)
- Position: Midfielder

Team information
- Current team: Wisła Płock
- Number: 18

Youth career
- 2008–2013: Zagreb
- 2013–2018: Dinamo Zagreb

Senior career*
Years	Team	Apps	(Gls)
2018–2020	Hajduk Split B	29	(5)
2019–2020	Hajduk Split	0	(0)
2020–2026	Gorica	163	(16)
2026–	Wisła Płock	7	(1)

International career
2015–2016	Croatia U16	8	(2)
2016–2017	Croatia U17	12	(2)
2017–2018	Croatia U18	4	(1)
2018–2019	Croatia U19	5	(0)
2021	Croatia U20	1	(0)
2021–2023	Croatia U21	14	(1)
- * Club domestic league appearances and goals as of 22:47, 20 October 2026 (UTC)

Jurica Pršir (born 29 May 2000) is a Croatian professional footballer who plays as a midfielder for Ekstraklasa club Wisła Płock.

== Club career ==
Pršir joined Hajduk Split together with Dario Špikić from Dinamo Zagreb in the summer of 2018. After not receiving any chances to play for Hajduk's first team, Pršir signed with Gorica on 12 October 2020.

On 12 June 2026, Polish club Wisła Płock announced the signing of Pršir on a three-year contract, starting from 1 September 2026 upon the expiration of his contract with Gorica. He joined Wisła on 11 July after both clubs reached an agreement for his earlier move.

== International career ==
Pršir has been capped for various Croatian youth national teams.
