= Musa Muhammed =

Nigerian footballer

Personal information
- Full name: Musa Muhammed Shehu
- Date of birth: 31 October 1996 (age 30)
- Place of birth: Kano, Nigeria
- Height: 1.74 m (5 ft 8 1/2 in)
- Position: Right-back

Team information
- Current team: Doxa Katokopias
- Number: 26

Youth career
- 2013–2015: FC Heart Academy

Senior career*
Years	Team	Apps	(Gls)
2015–2018	İstanbul Başakşehir	3	(0)
2017	→ Željezničar (loan)	6	(0)
2017–2018	→ Lokomotiv Plovdiv (loan)	23	(0)
2018–2022	Gorica	79	(2)
2022–2023	Sarajevo	15	(1)
2023–	Doxa Katokopias	3	(0)

International career
2013–2015	Nigeria U17	9	(3)
2015–2016	Nigeria U20	9	(4)
2016	Nigeria	3	(0)
- * Club domestic league appearances and goals as of 2 September 2023

Musa Muhammed Shehu (born 31 October 1996) is a Nigerian professional footballer who plays as a right-back for Cypriot First Division club Doxa Katokopias.

== Club career ==
Born in Kano, Muhammed has played club football for İstanbul Başakşehir.

On 3 February 2017, Muhammed signed for Željezničar.

On 7 September 2017, Muhammed was loaned to Bulgarian First League club Lokomotiv Plovdiv.

On 28 June 2022, Muhammed signed for Sarajevo.

== International career ==
He made his international debut for Nigeria in 2016, against Mali in an international friendly. and he was selected by Nigeria for their 35-man provisional squad for the 2016 Summer Olympics.
