= NK Kurilovec =

Association football club in Croatia

- Full name: NK Kurilovec Velika Gorica
- Founded: 1948; 78 years ago
- Ground: SRC Udarnik
- Capacity: 1,000
- Manager: Senad Harambašić
- League: Treća HNL
- Website: www.nk-kurilovec.hr

NK Kurilovec are a football team from Velika Gorica currently playing in the Treća HNL.

Kurilovec changed their name from NK Udarnik Kurilovec in 2018 after the town of Kurilovec became a part of Velika Gorica.

Udarnik were promoted to the Croatian third league in 2017 after winning the 4th division title by ten points. It is their second appearance in the third division.

They appeared in the 2003-04 Croatian Cup, losing in the preliminary round.

The club has a football school for children. They organise the Alpas Cup for under-11s, which features teams from all over Europe.

== Current squad ==
Note: Flags indicate national team as defined under FIFA eligibility rules; some limited exceptions apply. Players may hold more than one non-FIFA nationality.

No.	Pos.	Nation	Player
—	GK	CRO	Matija Halilić
—	GK	CRO	Leon Išek
—	DF	CRO	Ivan Bolješić
—	DF	CRO	Tomislav Grdenić
—	DF	CRO	Marko Kušec
—	DF	CRO	Ante Radoš
—	DF	CRO	Albin Saiti

No.	Pos.	Nation	Player
—	DF	BIH	Mijo Šarić
—	DF	CRO	Stjepan Završki
—	MF	CRO	Habib Alili
—	MF	CRO	Antonio Bakula
—	MF	CRO	Marin Matoš
—	MF	NGR	Musa Ugbede
—	FW	CRO	Filip Župetić

== Personnel ==
Position	Staff
Manager	(Croatia) Senad Harambašić
Fitness coach	(Croatia) Ivan Zagorec

|}
