= 2018–19 HNK Gorica season =

HNK Gorica
2018–19 season
- Chairman: Nenad Črnko
- Manager: Ivan Prelec (until 4 June 2018); Sergej Jakirović (since 18 June 2018)
- Stadium: Stadion Radnik
- Prva HNL: 6th
- Top goalscorer: League: Łukasz Zwoliński (14); All: Łukasz Zwoliński (14)
- Highest home attendance: 4,257 v Dinamo Zagreb (17 March 2019)
- Lowest home attendance: 954 v Istra 1961 (10 May 2019)
- Average home league attendance: 2,150

The 2018–19 HNK Gorica season was the club's 10th season in existence and the 1st season in the top flight of Croatian football.

== First-team squad ==
As of 26 May 2019

Note: Flags indicate national team as defined under FIFA eligibility rules; some limited exceptions apply. Players may hold more than one non-FIFA nationality.

No.	Pos.	Nation	Player
1	GK	CRO	Kristijan Kahlina
2	DF	NGR	Musa Muhammed
3	DF	BIH	Aleksandar Jovičić
4	DF	NGR	Godfrey Oboabona
5	DF	CRO	Igor Čagalj (Captain)
6	MF	POL	Michał Masłowski
7	MF	ROU	Ronaldo Deaconu
8	MF	NED	Joey Suk
9	FW	POL	Łukasz Zwoliński
10	MF	CRO	Matija Dvorneković
11	MF	NED	Justin Mathieu
12	GK	CRO	Marko Veriga
14	MF	CRO	Martin Maloča

No.	Pos.	Nation	Player
15	DF	SRB	Nemanja Ljubisavljević
18	MF	CRO	Martin Šroler
19	DF	CRO	Marijan Čabraja
21	MF	UGA	Farouk Miya
22	DF	GEO	Giorgi Mchedlishvili
25	DF	CRO	Krešimir Krizmanić
25	DF	CRO	Krešimir Krizmanić
30	MF	CRO	Mario Marina
33	DF	CRO	Matija Špičić
40	MF	GHA	Ahmed Ramzy Yussif (on loan from Accra Lions)
44	FW	CRO	Kristijan Lovrić
45	DF	GHA	Nasiru Moro (on loan from Accra Lions)
99	FW	SEN	Cherif Ndiaye

== Transfers ==
=== In ===
Pos	Player	Transferred from	Fee	Date	Source
FW	(Poland) Łukasz Zwoliński	(Poland) Pogoń Szczecin	Free	19 June 2018	
DF	(Bosnia and Herzegovina) Aleksandar Jovičić	(Croatia) Slaven Belupo	Free	5 July 2018	
FW	(Croatia) Marko Dabro	(Croatia) Cibalia	Free	5 July 2018	
FW	(Croatia) Kristijan Lovrić	(Croatia) Lokomotiva	500,000 €	5 July 2018	
MF	(Uganda) Farouk Miya	(Belgium) Standard Liège	100,000 €	13 July 2018	
MF	(Croatia) Martin Maloča	(Croatia) Sesvete	Free	17 July 2018	
FW	(Armenia) David Arshakyan	(Denmark) Vejle BK	Free	20 July 2018	
MF	(Netherlands) Joey Suk	No team	Free	27 July 2018	
DF	(Croatia) Marijan Čabraja	No team	Free	6 August 2018	
DF	(Nigeria) Musa Muhammed	(Turkey) İstanbul Başakşehir	Free	6 August 2018	
GK	(Romania) Laurențiu Brănescu	(Italy) Juventus	Loan	13 August 2018	
DF	(Ghana) Nasiru Moro	(Ghana) Accra Lions	Loan	1 September 2018	
MF	(Ghana) Ahmed Ramzy Yussif	(Ghana) Accra Lions	Loan	1 September 2018	
DF	(Nigeria) Godfrey Oboabona	No team	Free	11 September 2018	
FW	(Nigeria) Godwin Udoh	(Nigeria) Femmak Football Academy	Free	2 January 2019	
FW	(Senegal) Cherif Ndiaye	No team	Free	19 January 2019	
MF	(Romania) Ronaldo Deaconu	(Romania) Concordia Chiajna	50,000 €	31 January 2019	
GK	(Croatia) Ivan Čović	(Romania) Sepsi OSK	Free	12 February 2019	
MF	(Netherlands) Justin Mathieu	(Netherlands) SC Cambuur	15,000 €	15 February 2019	

Source: Glasilo Hrvatskog nogometnog saveza

=== Out ===
Pos	Player	Transferred to	Fee	Date	Source
MF	(Romania) Victoraș Astafei	No team	Free	15 June 2018	
FW	(Estonia) Henrik Ojamaa	(Poland) Miedź Legnica	Free	15 June 2018	
DF	(Croatia) Hrvoje Jančetić	No team	Free	1 July 2018	
FW	(Armenia) David Arshakyan	No team	Free	2 January 2019	
FW	(Croatia) Marko Dabro	No team	Free	2 January 2019	
FW	(Nigeria) Godwin Udoh	No team	Free	15 January 2019	
MF	(Nigeria) Iyayi Atiemwen	(Croatia) Dinamo Zagreb	2,650,000 €	22 January 2019	
MF	(Croatia) Dinko Matošević	(Croatia) Hrvatski Dragovoljac	Loan	30 January 2019	
MF	(Croatia) Adrian Zenko	(Croatia) Sesvete	Loan	30 January 2019	
GK	(Romania) Laurențiu Brănescu	(Italy) Juventus	Recalled from loan	31 January 2019	
DF	(Croatia) Damir Žutić	(Lithuania) FK Atlantas	Free	27 February 2019	

Source: Glasilo Hrvatskog nogometnog saveza

Total spending: ▼665,000 €

Total income: ▲2,650,000 €

Total expenditure: ▲1,990,000 €

== Competitions ==
=== Overview ===
Competition	First match	Last match	Starting round	Final position	Record							
Competition	First match	Last match	Starting round	Final position	Pld	W	D	L	GF	GA	GD	Win %
HT Prva liga	28 July 2018	26 May 2019	Matchday 1	6th	36	17	8	11	57	46	+11	47.22
Total					36	17	8	11	57	46	+11	47.22

Last updated: 5 June 2021
Source: Soccerway

=== HT Prva liga ===
==== League table ====
Pos	Team	Pld	W	D	L	GF	GA	GD	Pts	Qualification or relegation
3	Osijek	36	18	8	10	61	36	+25	62 (Note: Head-to-head points: Osijek 7 pts, Hajduk Split 4 pts.)	Qualification for the Europa League second qualifying round
4	Hajduk Split	36	17	11	8	59	39	+20	62	Qualification for the Europa League first qualifying round
5	Gorica	36	17	8	11	57	46	+11	59	
6	Lokomotiva	36	13	10	13	51	43	+8	49	
7	Slaven Belupo	36	7	16	13	41	53	−12	37	

Source: PrvaHNL.hr
Rules for classification: 1) Points; 2) Head-to-head points; 3) Head-to-head goal difference; 4) Head-to-head goals scored (at home if two teams tied); 5) Goal difference; 6) Goals scored; 7) Play-off
(Note: Criteria 2-4 and 7 is only used if deciding champion, teams to international competition or teams for relegation and in that case criteria 6 will not be used).

==== Results summary ====
Overall								Home						Away					
Pld	W	D	L	GF	GA	GD	Pts	W	D	L	GF	GA	GD	W	D	L	GF	GA	GD
36	17	8	11	57	46	+11	59	8	3	7	30	27	+3	9	5	4	27	19	+8

Last updated: 5 June 2021.
Source: Prva HNL

==== Results by round ====
Round	1	2	3	4	5	6	7	8	9	10	11	12	13	14	15	16	17	18	19	20	21	22	23	24	25	26	27	28	29	30	31	32	33	34	35	36
Ground	A	H	H	A	H	A	H	A	H	H	A	A	H	A	H	A	H	A	A	A	H	A	H	A	H	A	H	H	H	A	H	A	H	A	H	A
Result	L	D	L	W	W	W	L	W	L	W	W	W	D	W	L	L	L	D	W	L	D	D	W	W	L	D	L	W	W	D	W	D	W	L	W	W
Position	8	7	9	6	5	5	5	5	5	4	4	4	4	4	5	5	5	5	5	5	5	5	5	5	6	6	6	6	5	6	5	5	5	5	5	5

Updated to match(es) played on 26 May 2019. Source: Prva HNL
A = Away; H = Home; W = Win; D = Draw; L = Loss

==== Matches ====
28 July 2018 1	Rijeka	2–0	Gorica	Rijeka
21:00 CEST (UTC+02:00)	Pavičić 20'; Pavelić 27'; Héber (yellow card) 68'; Grahovac (yellow card) 72'	Report	Maloča (yellow card) 43'; Masłowski (yellow card) 45+1'; Jovičić (yellow card) 61'; Marina (yellow card) 79'	Stadium: Stadion Rujevica; Attendance: 5,211; Referee: Igor Križarić

4 August 2018 2	Gorica	3–3	Slaven Belupo	Velika Gorica
17:30 CEST (UTC+02:00)	Miya (yellow card) 38'; Marina (yellow card) 61'; Zwoliński 63' 74'; Atiemwen 65'; Dvorneković (yellow card) 70'; Lovrić (yellow card) 89'	Report	Puclin (yellow card) 17'; Karamarko (yellow card) 34'; Jelić 71'; Mendy 78' 89'	Stadium: Stadion Radnik; Attendance: 1,514; Referee: Dario Bel

11 August 2018 3	Gorica	2–3	Inter Zaprešić	Velika Gorica
17:30 CEST (UTC+02:00)	Atiemwen 5'; Čagalj (yellow card) 33'; Miya 47'; Mchedlishvili (yellow card) 56'; Marina (yellow card) 74'; Špičić (yellow card) 77'	Report	Andrić 41' (pen.); Postonjski (yellow card) 57'; Muhar 83'; Valentić (yellow card) 86'; Mamut 90+3' (yellow card) 90+3'	Stadium: Stadion Radnik; Attendance: 1,721; Referee: Fran Jović

19 August 2018 4	Hajduk Split	0–2	Gorica	Split
21:00 CEST (UTC+02:00)	Jradi (yellow card) 61'; Said (red card) 90+1'; Šego (yellow card) 90+7'	Report	Miya 27'; Zwoliński 40' (pen.) (yellow card) 41'; Suk (yellow card) 51'; Dvorneković (yellow card) 66'; Špičić (yellow card) 79'	Stadium: Stadion Poljud; Attendance: 11,172; Referee: Marin Vidulin

25 August 2018 5	Gorica	2–0	Rudeš	Velika Gorica
17:30 CEST (UTC+02:00)	Marina 11'; Atiemwen (yellow card) 35'; Jovičić (yellow card) 44'; Zwoliński 69'; Žutić (yellow card) 73'	Report	Obanor (yellow card) 29'; Oluić (yellow card) 44'; Soldo (yellow card) 45'; Mišković (yellow card) 80'	Stadium: Stadion Radnik; Attendance: 1,731; Referee: Damir Batinić

2 September 2018 6	Istra 1961	0–2	Gorica	Pula
18:30 CEST (UTC+02:00)	Rubić (yellow card) 12'	Report	Suk 74'; Zwoliński 78'; Marina (yellow card) 84'	Stadium: Stadion Aldo Drosina; Attendance: 1,351; Referee: Goran Gabrilo

15 September 2018 7	Gorica	0–1	Dinamo Zagreb	Velika Gorica
16:30 CEST (UTC+02:00)	Mchedlishvili (yellow card) 11'; Čagalj (yellow card) 31'; Marina (yellow card) 43'; Zwoliński (yellow card) 69'	Report	Carvajal 49'; Stojanović (yellow card) 59' (yellow-red card) 65'; Gojak (yellow card) 90+3'	Stadium: Stadion Radnik; Attendance: 4,029; Referee: Mario Zebec

22 September 2018 8	Osijek	0–1	Gorica	Osijek
16:30 CEST (UTC+02:00)	Hajradinović (yellow card) 76'	Report	Muhammed (yellow card) 47'; Zwoliński 57'; Oboabona (yellow card) 60'	Stadium: Gradski Vrt Stadium; Attendance: 2,450; Referee: Ivan Vučković

30 September 2018 9	Gorica	0–3	Lokomotiva	Velika Gorica
16:00 CEST (UTC+02:00)	Šroler (yellow card) 78'	Report	Kastrati 42'; M. Burić (yellow card) 45+1'; Uzuni 70'; D. Halilović 81'; Karačić (yellow card) 88'	Stadium: Stadion Radnik; Attendance: 1,900; Referee: Tihomir Pejin

6 October 2018 10	Gorica	2–1	Rijeka	Velika Gorica
15:00 CEST (UTC+02:00)	Marina (yellow card) 29'; Musa (yellow card) 32'; Dvorneković (yellow card) 33'; Zwoliński 54'; Atiemwen (yellow card) 57' (goal) 80'; Lovrić (yellow card) 85'; Čagalj (yellow card) 86'	Report	Puljić 45+1' (pen.) (yellow card) 65'; Grahovac (yellow card) 79'	Stadium: Stadion Radnik; Attendance: 2,659; Referee: Fran Jović

21 October 2018 11	Slaven Belupo	0–1	Gorica	Koprivnica
15:00 CEST (UTC+02:00)	Nowak (yellow card) 55'; Mateus (red card) 90+3'	Report	Atiemwen 50'; Maloča (yellow card) 58'; Zwoliński (yellow card) 64'; Suk (yellow card) 69'	Stadium: Gradski stadion Attendance: 802; Referee: Zdenko Lovrić

27 October 2018 12	Inter Zaprešić	1–3	Gorica	Zaprešić
15:00 CET (UTC+01:00)	Andrić 10' (yellow card) 22'; Šimunec (yellow card) 31'	Report	Maloča (yellow card) 18'; Dvorneković 32'; Atiemwen 44'; Marina 49'; Špičić (yellow card) 59'; Lovrić (yellow card) 77'	Stadium: Ivan Laljak-Ivić Stadium; Attendance: 414; Referee: Ante Čuljak

4 November 2018 13	Gorica	1–1	Hajduk Split	Velika Gorica
15:00 CET (UTC+01:00)	Atiemwen 12'; Marina (yellow card) 20'; Čagalj (red card) 43'; Čabraja (yellow card) 53'	Report	Ismajli (yellow card) 2'; Jradi (yellow card) 16'; Jairo 31'; Bradarić (yellow card) 55'; Juranović (yellow card) 67'; Ivanovski (yellow card) 70'	Stadium: Stadion Radnik; Attendance: 3,711; Referee: Fran Jović

9 November 2019 14	Rudeš	0–1	Gorica	Zagreb
18:00 CET (UTC+01:00)	João Erick (yellow card) 49' (yellow-red card) 74'; Pantalon (yellow card) 73'	Report	Zwoliński 62'; Atiemwen (yellow card) 76'	Stadium: Stadion Kranjčevićeva; Attendance: 280; Referee: Dario Kulušić

24 November 2018 15	Gorica	0–2	Istra 1961	Velika Gorica
17:30 CET (UTC+01:00)	Maloča (yellow card) 53'	Report	J. Rodríguez 48'; Regan 90+3'	Stadium: Stadion Radnik; Attendance: 1,577; Referee: Igor Križarić

2 December 2018 16	Dinamo Zagreb	1–0	Gorica	Zagreb
15:00 CET (UTC+01:00)	Perić (yellow card) 49'; Šitum 55'	Report	Marina (yellow card) 65'; Oboabona (yellow card) 75'	Stadium: Stadion Maksimir; Attendance: 2,477; Referee: Ivan Bebek

9 December 2018 17	Gorica	1–2	Osijek	Velika Gorica
17:30 CET (UTC+01:00)	Marina (yellow card) 10' (yellow-red card) 90+3'; Suk 11' (yellow card) 24'	Report	Marić 40' (pen.); Janža (yellow card) 64'; Grgić 74'; Guti (yellow card) 88'; Malenica (yellow card) 90+2'	Stadium: Stadion Radnik; Attendance: 1,653; Referee: Goran Gabrilo

14 December 2018 18	Lokomotiva	2–2	Gorica	Zagreb
18:00 CET (UTC+01:00)	Radonjić 32'; Ivanušec 75'; Mlinar (yellow card) 87'	Report	Miya (yellow card) 19'; Čabraja 43'; Atiemwen (yellow card) 51' (goal) 88'	Stadium: Stadion Kranjčevićeva; Attendance: 250; Referee: Goran Gabrilo

3 February 2019 19	Rijeka	1–3	Gorica	Rijeka
17:30 CET (UTC+01:00)	Acosty 6' (yellow card) 86'	Report	Suk (yellow card) 26'; Zwoliński 30' (pen.); Miya (yellow card) 32'; Čagalj (yellow card) 52'; Mtchedlishvili (yellow card) 55'; Dvorneković 57'; Maloča (yellow card) 80' (goal) 87'	Stadium: Stadion Rujevica; Attendance: 3,712; Referee: Dario Bel

9 February 2019 20	Slaven Belupo	2–0	Gorica	Koprivnica
15:00 CEST (UTC+02:00)	Krstanović 3'; Puclin 13' (yellow card) 49'; Karamarko (yellow card) 54'	Report	Čagalj (yellow card) 13'; Muhammed (yellow card) 24'; Marina (yellow card) 37'; Jovičić (yellow card) 78'	Stadium: Gradski stadion Attendance: 783; Referee: Ivan Bebek

16 February 2019 21	Gorica	2–2	Inter Zaprešić	Velika Gorica
17:30 CEST (UTC+02:00)	Lovrić 11' (yellow card) 31'; Maloča (yellow card) 41'; Čabraja (yellow card) 65'; Ndiaye (yellow card) 79'; Miya (yellow card) 84'; Suk 85'	Report	Rak 6' (yellow card) 45'; Šimunec (yellow card) 11' (yellow-red card) 20'; Matković (yellow card) 46'; Brezovec (yellow card) 82'	Stadium: Stadion Radnik; Attendance: 1,629; Referee: Dalibor Mlakar

23 February 2019 22	Hajduk Split	0–0	Gorica	Split
17:30 CET (UTC+01:00)	Lopez (yellow card) 48'; Nejašmić (yellow card) 73'; Tudor (yellow card) 87'	Report	Zwolinski (yellow card) 54'; Marina (yellow card) 63'	Stadium: Stadion Poljud; Attendance: 6,408; Referee: Marin Vidulin

2 March 2019 23	Gorica	3–1	Rudeš	Velika Gorica
15:00 CEST (UTC+02:00)	Ndiaye 21' 44'; Zwoliński 37'; Deaconu (yellow card) 86'	Report	Rožman (yellow card) 46'; Pasariček (yellow card) 64'; Lisakovich 82'	Stadium: Stadion Radnik; Attendance: 1,843; Referee: Igor Križarić

9 March 2019 24	Istra 1961	0–3	Gorica	Pula
17:30 CET (UTC+01:00)	Rimane (yellow card) 42'; Bosančić (yellow card) 50'; Maicon (yellow card) 83'; Galilea (yellow card) 88'	Report	Marina (yellow card) 39'; Suk 45'; Muhammed (yellow card) 56'; Ndiaye 66' 89'; Mathieu (yellow card) 90+4'	Stadium: Stadion Aldo Drosina; Attendance: 892; Referee: Mario Zebec

17 March 2019 25	Gorica	1–2	Dinamo Zagreb	Velika Gorica
15:00 CET (UTC+01:00)	Marina (yellow card) 24'; Lovrić 57' (pen.); Miya (yellow card) 60'; Čagalj (yellow card) 61'	Report	Andrić 25' (pen.), 61' (pen.); Leovac (yellow card) 57'; Šunjić (yellow card) 64'; Perić (yellow card) 67'; Gojak (yellow card) 85'; Majer (yellow card) 86'	Stadium: Stadion Radnik; Attendance: 4,257; Referee: Duje Strukan

29 March 2019 26	Osijek	2–2	Gorica	Osijek
16:30 CEST (UTC+02:00)	Lončar (yellow card) 54'; Škorić 57' (yellow card) 71'; Ejupi 69' (yellow card) 76' (yellow-red card) 89'	Report	Jovičić (yellow card) 15'; Suk (yellow card) 25'; Lovrić 40' 58'; Maloča (yellow card) 43'; Mathieu (yellow card) 90+3'	Stadium: Gradski Vrt Stadium; Attendance: 1,750; Referee: Fran Jović

2 April 2019 27	Gorica	0–2	Lokomotiva	Velika Gorica
16:30 CEST (UTC+02:00)	Marina (yellow card) 52'; Miya (yellow card) 60' (yellow-red card) 81'; Muhammed (yellow card) 81'	Report	Radonjić 37' 84'	Stadium: Stadion Radnik; Attendance: 1,194; Referee: Igor Križarić

6 April 2019 28	Gorica	1–0	Rijeka	Velika Gorica
19:00 CEST (UTC+02:00)	Lovrić (yellow card) 21' (goal) 48'; Čagalj (yellow card) 70'; Oboabona (yellow card) 71'; Marina (yellow card) 79'	Report	Escoval (yellow card) 27'; T. Halilović (yellow card) 79'	Stadium: Stadion Radnik; Attendance: 1,677; Referee: Ivan Vučković

14 April 2019 29	Gorica	4–3	Slaven Belupo	Velika Gorica
16:30 CEST (UTC+02:00)	Ndiaye 22'; Lovrić 34' (pen.); Dvorneković 38'; Čagalj (yellow card) 68'; Zwoliński 90'	Report	Krstanović 9' 86' (yellow card) 90'; Delić (yellow card) 33'; Suk 62' (o.g.) (yellow card) 79'; Puclin (yellow card) 73'; Doležal (yellow card) 79'; Mladen (yellow card) 86'	Stadium: Stadion Radnik; Attendance: 989; Referee: Mario Zebec

20 April 2019 30	Inter Zaprešić	2–2	Gorica	Zaprešić
16:30 CEST (UTC+02:00)	Šimunec (yellow card) 5' (goal) 80'; Serderov 13'; Kelava (yellow card) 36'; Matković (yellow card) 58'; Postonjski (yellow card) 58'; Brezovec (yellow card) 64'; Čeliković (yellow card) 77'	Report	Mchedlishvili (yellow card) 22'; Lovrić 23' (pen.); Marina (yellow card) 24'; Zwoliński (yellow card) 35' (goal) 58' (pen.); Dvorneković (yellow card) 53'; Ndiaye (yellow card) 64'	Stadium: Ivan Laljak-Ivić Stadium; Attendance: 1,224; Referee: Igor Pajač

27 April 2019 31	Gorica	3–0	Hajduk Split	Velika Gorica
16:30 CEST (UTC+02:00)	Miya 11', 47'; Zwolinski 45' (pen.) (yellow card) 48'; Maloča (yellow card) 56'; Lovrić (yellow card) 88'	Report	Posavec (yellow card) 43'; Jairo (yellow card) 51'; Bradarić (yellow card) 52'; Ismajli (yellow card) 59'	Stadium: Stadion Radnik; Attendance: 3,371; Referee: Damir Batinić

3 May 2019 32	Rudeš	1–1	Gorica	Zagreb
18:00 CEST (UTC+02:00)	D. Halilović (yellow card) 38'; Banić (yellow card) 71'; Mrkonjić 83'; João Erick (yellow card) 86'; Pejović (yellow card) 89'	Report	Ndiaye 17' (pen.); Marina (yellow card) 37'; Čagalj (yellow card) 57'; Maloča (yellow card) 78'	Stadium: Stadion Kranjčevićeva; Attendance: 169; Referee: Marin Vidulin

10 May 2019 33	Gorica	4–1	Istra 1961	Velika Gorica
16:30 CEST (UTC+02:00)	Muhammed (yellow card) 50' (goal) 83'; Ndiaye 59' (yellow card) 72'; Dvorneković 71'; Zwoliński 80'; Čabraja (yellow card) 89'	Report	Pavić (red card) 23'; Regan 31'; J. Rodríguez (yellow card) 49'; Galilea (yellow card) 50'; Miérez (yellow card) 54'; Bosančić (yellow card) 59'	Stadium: Stadion Radnik; Attendance: 954; Referee: Damir Batinić

15 May 2019 34	Dinamo Zagreb	3–1	Gorica	Zagreb
18:00 CEST (UTC+02:00)	Moro 17'; Olmo 21'; Leovac 71'	Report	Ndiaye 25'; Maloča (yellow card) 54'; Lovrić (yellow card) 76'	Stadium: Stadion Maksimir; Attendance: 610; Referee: Goran Gabrilo

19 May 2019 35	Gorica	1–0	Osijek	Velika Gorica
19:00 CEST (UTC+02:00)	Lovrić (yellow card) 21'; Suk (yellow card) 26' (goal) 57'; Čabraja (yellow card) 40'; Jovičić (yellow card) 75'; Muhammed (yellow card) 90+4'	Report	Šutalo (yellow card) 90+4'	Stadium: Stadion Radnik; Attendance: 1,693; Referee: Ivan Bebek

26 May 2019 36	Lokomotiva	2–3	Gorica	Zagreb
19:00 CEST (UTC+02:00)	Hujber (yellow card) 41'; Ivanušec 51' (pen.); N. Burić 90+2'	Report	Lovrić (yellow card) 8' (goal) 14' 60'; Čabraja (yellow card) 17'; Miya 52'	Stadium: Stadion Kranjčevićeva; Attendance: 380; Referee: Mario Zebec

Source: Croatian Football Federation

== Player seasonal records ==
Updated 6 June 2021

=== Goals ===
Rank	Name	League	Total
1	(Poland) Łukasz Zwoliński	14	14
2	(Croatia) Kristijan Lovrić	10	10
3	(Senegal) Cherif Ndiaye	8	8
4	(Nigeria) Iyayi Atiemwen	7	7
5	(Uganda) Farouk Miya	5	5
5	(Netherlands) Joey Suk	5	5
7	(Croatia) Matija Dvorneković	4	4
8	(Croatia) Mario Marina	2	2
9	(Croatia) Marijan Čabraja	1	1
9	(Nigeria) Musa Muhammed	1	1
TOTALS		57	57

Source: Competitive matches

=== Clean sheets ===
Rank	Name	League	Total
1	(Croatia) Kristijan Kahlina	11	11
TOTALS		11	11

Source: Competitive matches

=== Disciplinary record ===
Number	Position	Player	1. HNL			Total		
Number	Position	Player	Yellow card	(yellow card) (yellow-red card)	Red card	Yellow card	(yellow card) (yellow-red card)	Red card
2	DF	(Nigeria) Musa Muhammed	7	0	0	7	0	0
3	DF	(Bosnia and Herzegovina) Aleksandar Jovičić	5	0	0	5	0	0
4	DF	(Nigeria) Godfrey Oboabona	3	0	0	3	0	0
5	DF	(Croatia) Igor Čagalj	9	0	1	9	0	1
6	MF	(Poland) Michał Masłowski	1	0	0	1	0	0
7	MF	(Romania) Ronaldo Deaconu	1	0	0	1	0	0
8	MF	(Netherlands) Joey Suk	7	0	0	7	0	0
9	FW	(Poland) Łukasz Zwoliński	6	0	0	6	0	0
10	MF	(Croatia) Matija Dvorneković	4	0	0	4	0	0
11	MF	(Netherlands) Justin Mathieu	2	0	0	2	0	0
14	MF	(Croatia) Martin Maloča	10	0	0	10	0	0
16	DF	(Croatia) Damir Žutić	1	0	0	1	0	0
18	MF	(Croatia) Martin Šroler	1	0	0	1	0	0
19	DF	(Croatia) Marijan Čabraja	5	0	0	5	0	0
20	MF	(Nigeria) Iyayi Atiemwen	4	0	0	4	0	0
21	MF	(Uganda) Farouk Miya	5	1	0	5	1	0
22	DF	(Georgia (country)) Giorgi Mchedlishvili	4	0	0	4	0	0
30	MF	(Croatia) Mario Marina	16	1	0	16	1	0
33	DF	(Croatia) Matija Špičić	3	0	0	3	0	0
44	FW	(Croatia) Kristijan Lovrić	9	0	0	9	0	0
99	FW	(Senegal) Cherif Ndiaye	4	0	0	4	0	0
TOTALS			107	2	1	107	2	1

=== Appearances and goals ===
Number	Position	Player	Apps	Goals	Apps	Goals
Number	Position	Player	Total		1. HNL (Note: First number represents appearances in starting eleven, while the second number indicates a substitute appearance.)	
1	GK	(Croatia) Kristijan Kahlina	36	0	36+0	0
2	DF	(Nigeria) Musa Muhammed	26	1	19+7	1
3	DF	(Bosnia and Herzegovina) Aleksandar Jovičić	27	0	26+1	0
4	DF	(Nigeria) Godfrey Oboabona	14	0	13+1	0
5	DF	(Croatia) Igor Čagalj	28	0	28+0	0
6	MF	(Poland) Michał Masłowski	10	0	5+5	0
7	MF	(Romania) Ronaldo Deaconu	5	0	0+5	0
7	MF	(Croatia) Dinko Matošević	3	0	0+3	0
8	MF	(Netherlands) Joey Suk	27	5	25+2	5
9	FW	(Poland) Łukasz Zwoliński	33	14	32+1	14
10	MF	(Croatia) Matija Dvorneković	33	4	24+9	4
11	FW	(Armenia) David Arshakyan	4	0	0+4	0
11	MF	(Netherlands) Justin Mathieu	9	0	2+7	0
14	MF	(Croatia) Martin Maloča	27	0	22+5	0
15	DF	(Serbia) Nemanja Ljubisavljević	3	0	0+3	0
16	DF	(Croatia) Damir Žutić	5	0	2+3	0
17	MF	(Croatia) Adrian Zenko	3	0	0+3	0
18	MF	(Croatia) Martin Šroler	13	0	2+11	0
19	DF	(Croatia) Marijan Čabraja	26	1	25+1	1
20	MF	(Nigeria) Iyayi Atiemwen	17	7	17+0	7
21	MF	(Uganda) Farouk Miya	30	5	22+8	5
22	DF	(Georgia (country)) Giorgi Mchedlishvili	22	0	19+3	0
24	FW	(Croatia) Marko Dabro	3	0	0+3	0
25	DF	(Croatia) Krešimir Krizmanić	1	0	0+1	0
30	MF	(Croatia) Mario Marina	30	2	28+2	2
33	DF	(Croatia) Matija Špičić	15	0	12+3	0
44	FW	(Croatia) Kristijan Lovrić	30	10	23+7	10
45	DF	(Ghana) Nasiru Moro	5	0	4+1	0
99	FW	(Senegal) Cherif Ndiaye	17	8	10+7	8
