= 2018–19 HNK Rijeka season =

Rijeka
2018–19 season
- Chairman: Damir Mišković
- Manager: Matjaž Kek (until 6 Oct 2018); Igor Bišćan (since 9 Oct 2018)
- Stadium: Rujevica
- Prva HNL: 2nd
- Croatian Cup: Winners
- UEFA Europa League: Third qualifying round
- Top goalscorer: League: Jakov Puljić (16); All: Antonio Čolak (19)
- Highest home attendance: 7,122 v Hajduk Split (12 August 2018)
- Lowest home attendance: 2,846 v Rudeš (28 April 2019)
- Average home league attendance: 4,526
Home colours	Away colours

The 2018–19 season was the 73rd season in HNK Rijeka's history. It was their 28th successive season in the Croatian First Football League, and 45th successive top tier season.

== Competitions ==
=== Overall ===
Competition	First match	Last match	Starting round	Final position	Record							
Competition	First match	Last match	Starting round	Final position	G	W	D	L	GF	GA	GD	Win %
HT Prva liga	28 Jul 2018	25 May 2019	Matchday 1	Runners-up	36	19	10	7	70	36	+34	52.78
Croatian Cup	26 Sep 2018	22 May 2019	First round	Winners	5	5	0	0	18	4	+14	100.00
Europa League	9 Aug 2018	16 Aug 2018	Third qualifying round	Third qualifying round	2	0	1	1	1	2	−1	0.00
Total					43	24	11	8	89	42	+47	55.81

Last updated: 25 May 2019.

=== HT Prva liga ===
==== Classification ====
Pos	Team	Pld	W	D	L	GF	GA	GD	Pts	Qualification or relegation
1	Dinamo Zagreb (C)	36	29	5	2	74	20	+54	92	Qualification for the Champions League second qualifying round
2	Rijeka	36	19	10	7	70	36	+34	67	Qualification for the Europa League third qualifying round (Note: Rijeka qualified for the Europa League third qualifying round by winning the 2018–19 Croatian Football Cup. As a result, the spot awarded to the runners-up (Europa League second qualifying round) was passed to the third-placed team, and the spot awarded to the third-placed team (Europa League first qualifying round) was passed to the fourth-placed team.)
3	Osijek	36	18	8	10	61	36	+25	62 (Note: Head-to-head points: Osijek 7 pts, Hajduk Split 4 pts.)	Qualification for the Europa League second qualifying round
4	Hajduk Split	36	17	11	8	59	39	+20	62	Qualification for the Europa League first qualifying round
5	Gorica	36	17	8	11	57	46	+11	59	

Source: PrvaHNL.hr
Rules for classification: 1) Points; 2) Head-to-head points; 3) Head-to-head goal difference; 4) Head-to-head goals scored (at home if two teams tied); 5) Goal difference; 6) Goals scored; 7) Play-off
(Note: Criteria 2-4 and 7 is only used if deciding champion, teams to international competition or teams for relegation and in that case criteria 6 will not be used).
(C) Champions

==== Results summary ====
Overall								Home						Away					
Pld	W	D	L	GF	GA	GD	Pts	W	D	L	GF	GA	GD	W	D	L	GF	GA	GD
36	19	10	7	70	36	+34	67	11	6	1	39	11	+28	8	4	6	31	25	+6

Last updated: 25 May 2019.
Source: Competitive matches

==== Results by round ====
Round	1	2	3	4	5	6	7	8	9	10	11	12	13	14	15	16	17	18	19	20	21	22	23	24	25	26	27	28	29	30	31	32	33	34	35	36
Ground	H	H	H	A	H	A	H	A	H	A	A	A	H	A	H	A	H	A	H	A	H	A	H	A	H	A	H	A	H	A	H	A	H	A	H	A
Result	W	W	D	W	D	D	D	L	D	L	W	D	W	W	W	W	W	D	L	W	D	W	W	L	W	W	W	L	W	L	W	W	D	L	W	D
Position	3	1	2	1	2	3	3	4	4	5	5	5	5	5	4	3	2	3	4	3	3	2	2	2	2	2	2	2	2	2	2	2	2	2	2	2

Updated to match(es) played on 25 May 2019. Source: Competitive matches
A = Away; H = Home; W = Win; D = Draw; L = Loss

==== Results by opponent ====
Team	Results				Points
Team	1	2	3	4	Points
Dinamo Zagreb	1–1	1–0	1–3	0–0	5
Gorica	2–0	1–2	1–3	0–1	3
Hajduk Split	1–1	1–1	0–0	0–4	3
Inter Zaprešić	4–0	2–1	3–0	7–0	12
Istra 1961	3–3	2–1	2–0	7–0	10
Lokomotiva	0–2	3–0	2–1	1–0	9
Osijek	1–1	2–1	3–1	1–2	7
Rudeš	2–1	5–1	4–2	3–1	12
Slaven Belupo	0–0	1–1	2–0	1–1	6

Source: 2018–19 Croatian First Football League article

== Matches ==
=== HT Prva liga ===
28 July 2018 1	Rijeka	2–0	Gorica	Rijeka
21:00 CEST (UTC+02:00)	Pavičić 20'; Pavelić 27'; Héber (yellow card) 68'; Grahovac (yellow card) 72'	Report	Maloča (yellow card) 43'; Masłowski (yellow card) 45+1'; Jovičić (yellow card) 61'; Marina (yellow card) 79'	Stadium: Rujevica; Attendance: 5,211; Referee: Igor Križarić (Čakovec)

3 August 2018 2	Rijeka	4–0	Inter Zaprešić	Rijeka
18:30 CEST (UTC+02:00)	Acosty 4'; Pavelić (yellow card) 43'; Gorgon 64', 65'; Héber 77'	Report	Postonjski (yellow card) 14'; I. Čeliković (yellow card) 34'; Prenga (yellow card) 40'	Stadium: Rujevica; Attendance: 4,650; Referee: Dalibor Mlakar (Zagreb)

12 August 2018 3	Rijeka	1–1	Hajduk Split	Rijeka
21:00 CEST (UTC+02:00)	Zuta (yellow card) 23'; Punčec (yellow card) 39'; Puljić 62'; Župarić (yellow card) 84'	Report	Fomitschow (yellow card) 45+1'; Mikulić (yellow card) 78'; Caktaš 87' (pen.) (yellow card) 90+5'; Jairo (yellow card) 89'	Stadium: Rujevica; Attendance: 7,122; Referee: Igor Pajač (Sveti Ivan Zelina)

19 August 2018 4	Rudeš	1–2	Rijeka	Rijeka
18:30 CEST (UTC+02:00)	Petrović 23'	Report	Župarić 30'; Čolak 37'; Héber (yellow card) 59'; Raspopović (yellow card) 88'	Stadium: Rujevica; Attendance: 2,475; Referee: Tihomir Pejin (Donji Miholjac)

26 August 2018 5	Rijeka	3–3	Istra 1961	Rijeka
21:00 CEST (UTC+02:00)	Héber 4', 30', 79'; Čolak (yellow card) 43'	Report	Mierez 3', 17' (yellow card) 88'; Rubić (yellow card) 41'; Landeta (yellow card) 45+1'; Grujević (yellow card) 46'; Cardozo (yellow card) 59'; J. Rodríguez (yellow card) 72'; Regan 81'	Stadium: Rujevica; Attendance: 4,517; Referee: Marko Matoc (Zaprešić)

2 September 2018 6	Dinamo Zagreb	1–1	Rijeka	Zagreb
21:00 CEST (UTC+02:00)	Gavranović 32'; Perić (yellow card) 61'	Report	Raspopović (yellow card) 11' (yellow-red card) 90' (goal) 38'	Stadium: Maksimir; Attendance: 5,752; Referee: Duje Strukan (Split)

16 September 2018 7	Rijeka	1–1	Osijek	Rijeka
19:00 CEST (UTC+02:00)	Grahovac (yellow card) 21'; Héber 57'; Lončar (yellow card) 76'; Pavičić (yellow card) 90+2'	Report	Bočkaj (yellow card) 51' (goal) 64'	Stadium: Rujevica; Attendance: 5,127; Referee: Fran Jović (Zagreb)

22 September 2018 8	Lokomotiva	2–0	Rijeka	Zagreb
19:00 CEST (UTC+02:00)	Datković 26'; Radonjić (penalty missed) 55'; Kolinger (yellow card) 64'; Kastrati 71'	Report	Punčec (red card) 53'; Pavičić (yellow card) 59'; Escoval (yellow card) 90+3'	Stadium: Kranjčevićeva; Attendance: 1,291; Referee: Duje Strukan (Split)

30 September 2018 9	Rijeka	0–0	Slaven Belupo	Rijeka
19:00 CEST (UTC+02:00)	Raspopović (yellow card) 54'; Čanađija (yellow card) 69'	Report	Međimorec (yellow card) 44'; Jelić (yellow card) 80'	Stadium: Rujevica; Attendance: 4,320; Referee: Dalibor Mlakar (Zagreb)

6 October 2018 10	Gorica	2–1	Rijeka	Velika Gorica
15:00 CEST (UTC+02:00)	Marina (yellow card) 29'; Musa (yellow card) 32'; Dvorneković (yellow card) 33'; Zwoliński 54'; Atiemwen (yellow card) 57' (goal) 80'; Lovrić (yellow card) 85'; Čagalj (yellow card) 86'	Report	Puljić 45+1' (pen.) (yellow card) 65' (penalty missed) 86'; Grahovac (yellow card) 79'	Stadium: Radnik; Attendance: 2,659; Referee: Fran Jović (Zagreb)

19 October 2018 11	Inter Zaprešić	1–2	Rijeka	Zaprešić
18:00 CEST (UTC+02:00)	Šimunec (yellow card) 32'; Mamut (yellow card) 45+1'; Solomon 84'	Report	Čolak 11', 63'; Lončar (yellow card) 30' (yellow-red card) 36'	Stadium: ŠRC Zaprešić; Attendance: 634; Referee: Mario Zebec (Cestica)

28 October 2018 12	Hajduk Split	1–1	Rijeka	Split
15:00 CET (UTC+01:00)	Jurić (yellow card) 5'; Said 28' (pen.)	Report	Čolak (yellow card) 13'; Gorgon 50' (pen.); Čanađija (yellow card) 58'; Župarić (yellow card) 90+2'	Stadium: Poljud; Attendance: 0 (behind closed doors); Referee: Tihomir Pejin (Donji Miholjac)

5 November 2018 13	Rijeka	5–1	Rudeš	Rijeka
20:00 CET (UTC+01:00)	Gorgon 19' (pen.); Héber 45', 70'; Čolak 55'; Puljić 83'	Report	Filipović (yellow card) 18'; Pantalon 28'; Klepač (yellow card) 66'	Stadium: Rujevica; Attendance: 3,428; Referee: Josip Lučić (Vinkovci)

11 November 2018 14	Istra 1961	1–2	Rijeka	Pula
15:00 CET (UTC+01:00)	J. L. Rodríguez (yellow card) 61'; Cardozo (yellow card) 79'; Perić-Komšić 88'	Report	Čolak 7'; Kvržić 35'; Zuta (yellow card) 85'; Puljić (yellow card) 90+3'	Stadium: Aldo Drosina; Attendance: 1,953; Referee: Goran Gabrilo (Split)

24 November 2018 15	Rijeka	1–0	Dinamo Zagreb	Rijeka
15:00 CET (UTC+01:00)	Zuta (yellow card) 35'; Čolak 64'; Acosty (yellow card) 90+1'	Report	Hajrović (yellow card) 29'; Dilaver (yellow card) 45'; Leovac (yellow card) 89'; Stojanović (yellow card) 90+1'	Stadium: Rujevica; Attendance: 4,635; Referee: Tihomir Pejin (Donji Miholjac)

1 December 2018 16	Osijek	1–2	Rijeka	Osijek
15:00 CET (UTC+01:00)	Šorša 8'; Pušić (yellow card) 31'; Kamenar (yellow card) 56'; Ćavar (yellow card) 71'	Report	Čolak 43', 55'; Mamić (yellow card) 90+5'	Stadium: Gradski Vrt; Attendance: 2,134; Referee: Mario Zebec (Cestica)

8 December 2018 17	Rijeka	3–0	Lokomotiva	Rijeka
15:00 CET (UTC+01:00)	Héber 13', 77' (yellow card) 49'; Kvržić 60'; Punčec (yellow card) 62'	Report	Drožđek (yellow card) 30'; Lecjaks (yellow card) 39'; Kolinger (yellow card) 74'	Stadium: Rujevica; Attendance: 4,057; Referee: Igor Pajač (Sveti Ivan Zelina)

30 January 2019 18	Slaven Belupo	1–1	Rijeka	Koprivnica
17:00 CET (UTC+01:00)	Goda (yellow card) 24'; Bačelić-Grgić 85'	Report	Punčec (yellow card) 9'; Acosty 48'; Čolak (yellow card) 79'	Stadium: Gradski; Attendance: 584; Referee: Domagoj Vučković (Zagreb)

3 February 2019 19	Rijeka	1–3	Gorica	Rijeka
17:30 CET (UTC+01:00)	Acosty 6' (yellow card) 86'	Report	Suk (yellow card) 26'; Zwoliński 30' (pen.); Miya (yellow card) 32'; Čagalj (yellow card) 52'; Mtchedlishvili (yellow card) 55'; Dvorneković 57'; Maloča (yellow card) 80' (goal) 87'	Stadium: Rujevica; Attendance: 3,712; Referee: Dario Bel (Osijek)

10 February 2019 20	Inter Zaprešić	0–3	Rijeka	Zaprešić
15:00 CET (UTC+01:00)	Muhar (yellow card) 55'; Brezovec (yellow card) 63'	Report	Mamić (yellow card) 26'; Puljić 66', 74'; Lončar 69'	Stadium: ŠRC Zaprešić; Attendance: 460; Referee: Tihomir Pejin (Donji Miholjac)

16 February 2019 21	Rijeka	0–0	Hajduk Split	Rijeka
17:30 CET (UTC+01:00)	Lončar (yellow card) 40'	Report	Ismajli (yellow card) 31'; López (yellow card) 84'; Barry (yellow card) 89'; Tudor (yellow card) 89'	Stadium: Rujevica; Attendance: 6,527; Referee: Fran Jović (Zagreb)

22 February 2019 22	Rudeš	2–4	Rijeka	Zagreb
18:00 CET (UTC+01:00)	Vuco 15' (pen.); Smoljo (yellow card) 51'; Juranović 81'	Report	Gorgon 41' (pen.) 60'; Acosty 43'; Murić (yellow card) 77'; Puljić 78'	Stadium: Kranjčevićeva; Attendance: 279; Referee: Marko Matoc (Zaprešić)

1 March 2019 23	Rijeka	2–0	Istra 1961	Rijeka
18:00 CET (UTC+01:00)	Gorgon 43'; Kvržić (yellow card) 61'; Murić 90+2'	Report	Maicon (yellow card) 30'; Pavić (yellow card) 75'; Regan (yellow card) 85'	Stadium: Rujevica; Attendance: 4,275; Referee: Duje Strukan (Split)

10 March 2019 24	Dinamo Zagreb	3–1	Rijeka	Zagreb
17:30 CET (UTC+01:00)	Lešković (yellow card) 37'; Gavranović 42'; Perić 57'; Moro 69'	Report	Puljić 6'; Bušnja (yellow card) 8'; Pavičić (yellow card) 21'; Gorgon (yellow card) 44'; Mamić (yellow card) 45'; Kvržić (yellow card) 65'	Stadium: Maksimir; Attendance: 6,186; Referee: Marko Matoc (Zaprešić)

17 March 2019 25	Rijeka	3–1	Osijek	Rijeka
17:30 CET (UTC+01:00)	Halilović 10'; Lepinjica (yellow card) 28' (goal) 29'; Acosty (yellow card) 65'; Puljić 85'	Report	Grgić (yellow card) 8'; Guti (yellow card) 33'; Škorić (yellow card) 59'; Pušić (yellow card) 65'; Ejupi 82'; Kleinheisler (yellow card) 90+4'	Stadium: Rujevica; Attendance: 4,347; Referee: Igor Pajač (Sveti Ivan Zelina)

29 March 2019 26	Lokomotiva	1–2	Rijeka	Zagreb
19:00 CET (UTC+01:00)	Majstorović 49'	Report	Gorgon 20'; Halilović (yellow card) 32'; Puljić 72'; Capan (yellow card) 74'	Stadium: Kranjčevićeva; Attendance: 830; Referee: Mario Zebec (Cestica)

2 April 2019 27	Rijeka	2–0	Slaven Belupo	Rijeka
19:00 CEST (UTC+02:00)	Murić 21'; Velkovski (yellow card) 23'; Puljić 69'	Report	Međimorec (yellow card) 27'; Šarlija (yellow card) 62'; Puclin (yellow card) 77'; Menalo (yellow card) 81'	Stadium: Rujevica; Attendance: 3,851; Referee: Dalibor Mlakar (Zagreb)

6 April 2019 28	Gorica	1–0	Rijeka	Velika Gorica
19:00 CEST (UTC+02:00)	Lovrić (yellow card) 21' (goal) 48'; Čagalj (yellow card) 70'; Oboabona (yellow card) 71'; Marina (yellow card) 79'	Report	Escoval (yellow card) 27'; Halilović (yellow card) 79'	Stadium: Radnik; Attendance: 1,677; Referee: Ivan Vučković (Zagreb)

13 April 2019 29	Rijeka	7–0	Inter Zaprešić	Rijeka
19:00 CEST (UTC+02:00)	Halilović 27'; Puljić (penalty missed) 41' 41' 44' (pen.) 88', 90+1'; Acosty 48'; Pavičić 58'	Report	Čeliković (yellow card) 5' (yellow-red card) 40'	Stadium: Rujevica; Attendance: 4,227; Referee: Ivan Vučković (Zagreb)

20 April 2019 30	Hajduk Split	4–0	Rijeka	Split
19:00 CEST (UTC+02:00)	Jurić 2'; Barry 30'; Caktaš 45', 50'; Svatok (yellow card) 87'	Report	Halilović (yellow card) 77'	Stadium: Poljud; Attendance: 14,752; Referee: Fran Jović (Zagreb)

28 April 2019 31	Rijeka	3–1	Rudeš	Rijeka
19:00 CEST (UTC+02:00)	Mamić (yellow card) 9'; Lončar 35'; Puljić 39'; Čolak 69'; Lepinjica (yellow card) 76'; Capan (yellow card) 90+2'	Report	Lisakovich 44' (yellow card) 52'; Obanor (yellow card) 71'; Mrkonjić (yellow card) 81'	Stadium: Rujevica; Attendance: 2,846; Referee: Tihomir Pejin (Donji Miholjac)

4 May 2019 32	Istra 1961	0–7	Rijeka	Pula
19:00 CEST (UTC+02:00)	Franić (yellow card) 90+1'	Report	Pavičić 28', 49'; Čolak 36', 62'; Acosty 67'; Puljić 69'; H. Smolčić (yellow card) 77'; Capan 90'	Stadium: Aldo Drosina; Attendance: 1,741; Referee: Goran Gabrilo (Split)

11 May 2019 33	Rijeka	0–0	Dinamo Zagreb	Rijeka
19:00 CEST (UTC+02:00)	Lepinjica (yellow card) 53'; Kvržić (yellow card) 72'	Report	Rrahmani (yellow card) 38'; Gojak (yellow card) 66'; Lešković (yellow card) 80'	Stadium: Rujevica; Attendance: 5,543; Referee: Mario Zebec (Cestica)

15 May 2019 34	Osijek	2–1	Rijeka	Osijek
20:00 CEST (UTC+02:00)	Marić 24', 48'; Špoljarić (yellow card) 39'; Guti (yellow card) 66'; Pilj (yellow card) 68'	Report	Halilović (yellow card) 4'; Čolak 11' (yellow card) 45'; Pavičić (yellow card) 26' (yellow-red card) 39'; Lepinjica (yellow card) 70'; Mamić (yellow card) 80'; Escoval (yellow card) 90'	Stadium: Gradski Vrt; Attendance: 2,032; Referee: Fran Jović (Zagreb)

18 May 2019 35	Rijeka	1–0	Lokomotiva	Rijeka
19:00 CEST (UTC+02:00)	Murić 36'; Puljić (yellow card) 54'; Capan (yellow card) 80'	Report	Hujber (yellow card) 23'; Ivanušec (yellow card) 58'; Majstorović (yellow card) 59'; Đurasek (yellow card) 62'	Stadium: Rujevica; Attendance: 3,068; Referee: Igor Pajač (Sveti Ivan Zelina)

25 May 2019 36	Slaven Belupo	1–1	Rijeka	Koprivnica
20:00 CEST (UTC+02:00)	Plantak 57'; Martinaga (yellow card) 62'; Mladen (yellow card) 79'	Report	Acosty 64'	Stadium: Gradski; Attendance: 872; Referee: Dalibor Mlakar (Zagreb)

Source: Croatian Football Federation

=== Croatian Cup ===
26 September 2018 R1	Križevci	0–9	Rijeka	Križevci
15:30 CEST (UTC+02:00)	Stubičan (yellow card) 12'; Bastašić (yellow card) 68'	Report	Čolak 18', 29', 75', 80', 87'; Bušnja 35'; Pavičić 40'; Čanađija 43', 89'; Escoval (yellow card) 63'	Stadium: Gradski; Attendance: 1,000; Referee: Ante Čuljak (Zagreb)

31 October 2018 R2	Varaždin	1–2	Rijeka	Varaždin
19:00 CET (UTC+01:00)	Benko 27'	Report	Puljić 4' (yellow card) 36'; Acosty (yellow card) 75'; Héber (yellow card) 81'; Lončar (yellow card) 90+1'; Čolak 90+3'	Stadium: Varteks; Attendance: 3,650; Referee: Ivan Vučković (Zagreb)

4 December 2018 QF	Lokomotiva	1–2	Rijeka	Zagreb
19:30 CET (UTC+01:00)	Radonjić 19'; Uzuni (red card) 44'; Drožđek (yellow card) 72'; Mlinar (yellow card) 90+3'	Report	Punčec (yellow card) 44'; Župarić (yellow card) 49'; Héber 54'; Gorgon 65' (yellow card) 80'	Stadium: Kranjčevićeva; Attendance: 650; Referee: Damir Batinić (Osijek)

24 April 2019 SF	Inter Zaprešić	1–2	Rijeka	Zaprešić
18:00 CEST (UTC+02:00)	Buljat (yellow card) 15'; Tatomirović (yellow card) 60'; Brezovec 90+1'	Report	Murić 30'; Halilović (yellow card) 70'; Lončar 86'; Lepinjica (yellow card) 90'	Stadium: ŠRC Zaprešić; Attendance: 2,463; Referee: Mario Zebec (Cestica)

22 May 2019 Final	Dinamo Zagreb	1–3	Rijeka	Pula
18:00 CEST (UTC+02:00)	Théophile-Catherine (yellow card) 53'; Oršić 64'; Olmo (penalty missed) 74'; Gavranović (yellow card) 86'	Report	Čolak 13' (yellow card) 27'; Capan (yellow card) 23'; Halilović 39'; Kvržić 85'	Stadium: Aldo Drosina; Attendance: 6,742; Referee: Damir Batinić (Osijek)

Source: Croatian Football Federation

=== UEFA Europa League ===
9 August 2018 QR3	Sarpsborg 08 (Norway)	1–1	(Croatia) Rijeka	Sarpsborg, Norway
20:45 CEST (UTC+02:00)	Thomassen (yellow card) 59'; Tamm (yellow card) 70'; Zachariassen 72'; Askar (yellow card) 74'	Report	Héber (yellow card) 60'; Gorgon 83'; Čanađija (yellow card) 89'	Stadium: Sarpsborg Stadion; Attendance: 5,944; Referee: Kevin Clancy (Scotland)

16 August 2018 QR3	Rijeka (Croatia)	0–1 (1–2 agg.)	(Norway) Sarpsborg 08	Rijeka, Croatia
20:45 CEST (UTC+02:00)	Zuta (yellow card) 75'	Report	Halvorsen (yellow card) 69'; Mortensen 83'; Muhammed (yellow card) 88'; Heintz (yellow card) 90+5'	Stadium: Rujevica; Attendance: 5,351; Referee: Donatas Rumšas (Lithuania)

Source: uefa.com

=== Friendlies ===
==== Pre-season ====
22 June 2018 Friendly	Rijeka (Croatia)	2–1	(Malta) Balzan	Rijeka, Croatia
18:30 CEST (UTC+02:00)	Puljić 4'; Acosty 88'	Report	Lepović 54'	Stadium: Rujevica (training ground); Attendance: 300; Referee: Marko Linić (Dražice)

27 June 2018 Friendly	Kraljevica	0–11	Rijeka	Kraljevica
19:00 CEST (UTC+02:00)		Report	Dangubić 10', 25'; Mamić 15', 21'; Črnic 40', 45'; Lončar 46'; Čolak 50', 57', 82'; Héber 59'	Stadium: Gradski stadion Milan Ružić-Minta; Attendance: 700; Referee: Marko Linić (Dražice)

29 June 2018 Friendly	Rijeka	10–0	Vukovar '91	Rijeka
18:00 CEST (UTC+02:00)	Acosty 5'; Héber 12'; Čolak 14', 20', 42'; Puljić 31'; Grahovac 50'; Bojinov 58'; Dangubić 69', 86'	Report		Stadium: Rujevica (training ground); Attendance: 300; Referee: Milan Kukuljan (Rijeka)

5 July 2018 Friendly	Rijeka (Croatia)	5–0	(Slovakia) Žilina	Kranjska Gora, Slovenia
18:00 CEST (UTC+02:00)	Lončar 15'; Pavičić 31'; Gorgon 33'; Héber 37'; Puljić 73'	Report		Stadium: Športni park Rudeč; Attendance: Behind closed doors Referee: Andrej Žnjidaršič (Kranj)

10 July 2018 Friendly	Rijeka (Croatia)	3–1	(Russia) Spartak Moscow	Villach, Austria
18:00 CEST (UTC+02:00)	Gigot 36' (o.g.); Čolak 68', 73'	Report	Timofeyev 86'	Stadium: Landskron; Attendance: 100; Referee: Günter Messner (Austria)

13 July 2018 Friendly	Rijeka (Croatia)	2–0	(England) Luton Town	Kranjska Gora, Slovenia
17:30 CEST (UTC+02:00)	Čolak 22'; Gorgon 32'	Report		Stadium: Športni park Rudeč; Attendance: Behind closed doors Referee: David Šmajc (Slovenia)

17 July 2018 Friendly	Rijeka (Croatia)	7–0	(Slovenia) Tabor Sežana	Rijeka, Croatia
19:00 CEST (UTC+02:00)	Kvržić 12'; Gorgon 19'; Héber 33'; Acosty 47'; Salkić 54' (o.g.); Čanađija 87'; Puljić 90'	Report		Stadium: Rujevica; Attendance: 1,311; Referee: Marko Linić (Dražice)

20 July 2018 Friendly	Rijeka	9–1	Zadar	Rijeka
19:00 CEST (UTC+02:00)	Pavičić 4', 11', 44'; Héber 27', 32'; Acosty 46', 51'; Gorgon 69' (pen.); Puljić 75'	Report	Torbarina 55'	Stadium: Rujevica; Attendance: 1,500; Referee: Vedran Jelenčić (Kastav)

==== On-season ====
22 August 2018 Friendly	Rijeka (Croatia)	6–1	(Slovenia) Brinje-Grosuplje	Rijeka, Croatia
	Čolak 26', 41'; Mitrović 31'; Escoval 36'; Bušnja 48'; Smolčić 66'	Report	Potočar 23'	Stadium: Rujevica (training ground); Attendance: Behind closed doors

8 September 2018 Friendly	Rijeka (Croatia)	4–0	(Slovenia) Maribor	Rijeka, Croatia
20:00 CEST (UTC+02:00)	Puljić 11' (pen.); Gorgon 30'; Čolak 40'; Héber 54'	Report		Stadium: Kantrida; Attendance: 10,000; Referee: Ivan Bebek (Rijeka)

==== Mid-season ====
12 January 2019 Friendly	Rijeka (Croatia)	0–3	(Germany) Wolfsburg	Albufeira, Portugal
13:00 GMT (UTC±00:00)		Report	Mehmedi 43', 53', 58'	Stadium: Estádio Municipal de Albufeira; Attendance: 100; Referee: Pablo Santos (Portugal)

17 January 2019 Friendly	Rijeka (Croatia)	3–1	(Switzerland) Servette	Albufeira, Portugal
19:00 GMT (UTC±00:00)	Héber 25' (pen.); Kvržić 74'; Capan 80'	Report	Schalk 90'	Stadium: Estádio Municipal de Albufeira; Attendance: 75

20 January 2019 Friendly	Rijeka (Croatia)	1–0	(China) Beijing Sinobo Guoan	Albufeira, Portugal
16:00 GMT (UTC±00:00)	Bušnja 86'	Report		Stadium: Estádio Municipal de Albufeira; Attendance: 50

25 January 2019 Friendly	Rijeka (Croatia)	3–0	(Slovenia) Krško	Rijeka, Croatia
17:00 CET (UTC+01:00)	Lončar 20'; Acosty 28', 55'	Report		Stadium: Rujevica; Attendance: 500; Referee: Vedran Jelenčić (Kastav)

== Player seasonal records ==
Updated 25 May 2019. Competitive matches only.

=== Goals ===
Rank	Name	League	Europe	Cup	Total
1	(Croatia) Antonio Čolak	12	–	7	19
2	(Croatia) Jakov Puljić	16	–	1	17
3	(Brazil) Héber Araujo dos Santos	9	–	1	10
3	(Austria) Alexander Gorgon	8	1	1	10
5	(Ghana) Maxwell Acosty	7	–	–	7
6	(Croatia) Domagoj Pavičić	4	–	1	5
7	(Croatia) Robert Murić	3	–	1	4
8	(Croatia) Tibor Halilović	2	–	1	3
8	(Bosnia and Herzegovina) Zoran Kvržić	2	–	1	3
8	(Bosnia and Herzegovina) Stjepan Lončar	2	–	1	3
11	(Croatia) Dario Čanađija	–	–	2	2
12	(Croatia) Luka Capan	1	–	–	1
12	(Croatia) Ivan Lepinjica	1	–	–	1
12	(Austria) Mario Pavelić	1	–	–	1
12	(Montenegro) Momčilo Raspopović	1	–	–	1
12	(Croatia) Dario Župarić	1	–	–	1
12	(Croatia) Denis Bušnja	–	–	1	1
TOTALS		70	1	18	89

Source: Competitive matches

=== Clean sheets ===
Rank	Name	League	Europe	Cup	Total
1	(Croatia) Simon Sluga	13	–	–	13
2	(Croatia) Andrej Prskalo	–	–	1	1
TOTALS		13	0	1	14

Source: Competitive matches

=== Disciplinary record ===
Number	Position	Player	1. HNL			Europe			Croatian Cup			Total		
Number	Position	Player	Booked	(yellow card) (yellow-red card)	Sent off (straight red)	Booked	(yellow card) (yellow-red card)	Sent off (straight red)	Booked	(yellow card) (yellow-red card)	Sent off (straight red)	Booked	(yellow card) (yellow-red card)	Sent off (straight red)
3	DF	(Croatia) Petar Mamić	5	0	0	0	0	0	0	0	0	5	0	0
4	DF	(Croatia) Roberto Punčec	3	0	1	0	0	0	1	0	0	4	0	1
5	MF	(Croatia) Dario Čanađija	2	0	0	1	0	0	0	0	0	3	0	0
6	MF	(Croatia) Ivan Lepinjica	4	0	0	0	0	0	1	0	0	5	0	0
7	MF	(Bosnia and Herzegovina) Zoran Kvržić	3	0	0	0	0	0	0	0	0	3	0	0
8	DF	(North Macedonia) Leonard Zuta	3	0	0	1	0	0	0	0	0	4	0	0
8	MF	(Croatia) Tibor Halilović	4	0	0	0	0	0	1	0	0	5	0	0
9	FW	(Brazil) Héber Araujo dos Santos	3	0	0	1	0	0	1	0	0	5	0	0
13	DF	(Croatia) Dario Župarić	2	0	0	0	0	0	1	0	0	3	0	0
14	MF	(Ghana) Maxwell Acosty	3	0	0	0	0	0	1	0	0	4	0	0
15	MF	(Bosnia and Herzegovina) Srđan Grahovac	3	0	0	0	0	0	0	0	0	3	0	0
17	FW	(Croatia) Antonio Čolak	4	0	0	0	0	0	1	0	0	5	0	0
18	MF	(Croatia) Robert Murić	1	0	0	0	0	0	0	0	0	1	0	0
19	DF	(Austria) Mario Pavelić	1	0	0	0	0	0	0	0	0	1	0	0
20	MF	(Austria) Alexander Gorgon	1	0	0	0	0	0	1	0	0	2	0	0
21	FW	(Croatia) Jakov Puljić	3	0	0	0	0	0	1	0	0	4	0	0
22	MF	(Croatia) Denis Bušnja	1	0	0	0	0	0	0	0	0	1	0	0
24	MF	(Croatia) Domagoj Pavičić	3	1	0	0	0	0	0	0	0	3	1	0
26	DF	(Portugal) João Escoval	3	0	0	0	0	0	1	0	0	4	0	0
29	DF	(Montenegro) Momčilo Raspopović	2	1	0	0	0	0	0	0	0	2	1	0
31	MF	(Croatia) Luka Capan	3	0	0	0	0	0	1	0	0	4	0	0
33	DF	(North Macedonia) Darko Velkovski	1	0	0	0	0	0	0	0	0	1	0	0
36	DF	(Croatia) Hrvoje Smolčić	1	0	0	0	0	0	0	0	0	1	0	0
44	MF	(Bosnia and Herzegovina) Stjepan Lončar	2	1	0	0	0	0	1	0	0	3	1	0
TOTALS			61	3	1	3	0	0	12	0	0	76	3	1

Source: nk-rijeka.hr

=== Appearances and goals ===
Number	Position	Player	Apps	Goals	Apps	Goals	Apps	Goals	Apps	Goals
Number	Position	Player	Total		1. HNL (Note: First number represents appearances in starting eleven, while the second number indicates a substitute appearance.)		Europa League		Croatian Cup	
2	DF	(Croatia) Filip Braut	1	0	1+0	0	0+0	0	0+0	0
3	DF	(Croatia) Petar Mamić	20	0	15+3	0	0+0	0	2+0	0
4	DF	(Croatia) Roberto Punčec	28	0	21+1	0	2+0	0	4+0	0
5	MF	(Croatia) Dario Čanađija	20	2	12+4	0	2+0	0	1+1	2
6	MF	(Croatia) Ivan Lepinjica	14	1	10+2	1	0+0	0	2+0	0
7	MF	(Bosnia and Herzegovina) Zoran Kvržić	36	3	23+6	2	0+2	0	5+0	1
8	MF	(Croatia) Tibor Halilović	20	3	13+5	2	0+0	0	2+0	1
8	DF	(North Macedonia) Leonard Zuta	17	0	13+0	0	2+0	0	2+0	0
9	FW	(Brazil) Héber Araujo dos Santos	19	10	13+2	9	2+0	0	2+0	1
11	MF	(Croatia) Matej Vuk	2	0	1+1	0	0+0	0	0+0	0
12	GK	(Croatia) Simon Sluga	41	0	35+0	0	2+0	0	4+0	0
13	DF	(Croatia) Dario Župarić	36	1	29+1	1	2+0	0	4+0	0
14	MF	(Ghana) Maxwell Acosty	34	7	18+11	7	2+0	0	2+1	0
15	MF	(Bosnia and Herzegovina) Srđan Grahovac	15	0	8+4	0	2+0	0	0+1	0
16	MF	(Croatia) Adrian Liber	1	0	0+1	0	0+0	0	0+0	0
17	FW	(Croatia) Antonio Čolak	31	19	16+8	12	0+2	0	3+2	7
18	MF	(Croatia) Robert Murić	17	4	12+4	3	0+0	0	1+0	1
19	DF	(Austria) Mario Pavelić	11	1	9+0	1	2+0	0	0+0	0
20	MF	(Austria) Alexander Gorgon	31	10	23+3	8	2+0	1	1+2	1
21	FW	(Croatia) Jakov Puljić	34	17	19+10	16	0+1	0	2+2	1
22	MF	(Croatia) Denis Bušnja	14	1	3+9	0	0+0	0	1+1	1
23	FW	(Croatia) Josip Mitrović	1	0	0+0	0	0+0	0	0+1	0
24	MF	(Croatia) Domagoj Pavičić	39	5	29+3	4	2+0	0	4+1	1
26	DF	(Portugal) João Escoval	26	0	20+3	0	0+0	0	3+0	0
27	DF	(Croatia) Ivan Tomečak	3	0	1+1	0	0+0	0	1+0	0
28	DF	(Croatia) Ivan Smolčić	1	0	0+1	0	0+0	0	0+0	0
29	DF	(Montenegro) Momčilo Raspopović	14	1	11+0	1	0+0	0	3+0	0
31	MF	(Croatia) Luka Capan	20	1	6+10	1	0+1	0	3+0	0
32	GK	(Croatia) Andrej Prskalo	2	0	1+0	0	0+0	0	1+0	0
33	DF	(North Macedonia) Darko Velkovski	7	0	4+2	0	0+0	0	0+1	0
36	DF	(Croatia) Hrvoje Smolčić	6	0	5+1	0	0+0	0	0+0	0
44	MF	(Bosnia and Herzegovina) Stjepan Lončar	31	3	24+3	2	0+0	0	2+2	1
77	FW	(North Macedonia) Milan Ristovski	3	0	1+2	0	0+0	0	0+0	0

Source: nk-rijeka.hr

=== Suspensions ===
Date Incurred	Competition	Player	Games Missed	Reason
2 Sep 2018	1. HNL	(Montenegro) Momčilo Raspopović	1	(yellow card) (yellow-red card)
22 Sep 2018	1. HNL	(Croatia) Roberto Punčec	1	Sent off (straight red)
6 Oct 2018	1. HNL	(Bosnia and Herzegovina) Srđan Grahovac	1	Booked
19 Oct 2018	1. HNL	(Bosnia and Herzegovina) Stjepan Lončar	1	(yellow card) (yellow-red card)
24 Nov 2018	1. HNL	(North Macedonia) Leonard Zuta	1	Booked
8 Dec 2018	1. HNL	(Brazil) Héber	1	Booked
30 Jan 2019	1. HNL	(Croatia) Roberto Punčec	1	Booked
30 Jan 2019	1. HNL	(Croatia) Antonio Čolak	1	Booked
10 Mar 2019	1. HNL	(Croatia) Domagoj Pavičić	1	Booked
10 Mar 2019	1. HNL	(Croatia) Petar Mamić	1	Booked
17 Mar 2019	1. HNL	(Ghana) Maxwell Acosty	1	Booked
17 Mar 2019	1. HNL	(Croatia) Ivan Lepinjica	1	Booked
20 Apr 2019	1. HNL	(Croatia) Tibor Halilović	1	Booked
11 May 2019	1. HNL	(Bosnia and Herzegovina) Zoran Kvržić	1	Booked
15 May 2019	1. HNL	(Croatia) Domagoj Pavičić	1	(yellow card) (yellow-red card)
15 May 2019	1. HNL	(Croatia) Ivan Lepinjica	1	Booked
15 May 2019	1. HNL	(Portugal) João Escoval	1	Booked
18 May 2019	1. HNL	(Croatia) Jakov Puljić	1	Booked
18 May 2019	1. HNL	(Croatia) Luka Capan	1	Booked

=== Penalties ===
For
Date	Competition	Player	Opposition	Scored?
6 Oct 2018	1. HNL	(Croatia) Jakov Puljić	Gorica	✓
6 Oct 2018	1. HNL	(Croatia) Jakov Puljić	Gorica	✗
28 Oct 2018	1. HNL	(Austria) Alexander Gorgon	Hajduk Split	✓
5 Nov 2018	1. HNL	(Austria) Alexander Gorgon	Rudeš	✓
22 Feb 2019	1. HNL	(Austria) Alexander Gorgon	Rudeš	✓
13 Apr 2019	1. HNL	(Croatia) Jakov Puljić	Inter Zaprešić	✗
13 Apr 2019	1. HNL	(Croatia) Jakov Puljić	Inter Zaprešić	✓
Against
Date	Competition	Goalkeeper	Opposition	Scored?
12 Aug 2018	1. HNL	(Croatia) Simon Sluga	Hajduk Split	✓
22 Sep 2018	1. HNL	(Croatia) Simon Sluga	Lokomotiva	✗
28 Oct 2018	1. HNL	(Croatia) Simon Sluga	Hajduk Split	✓
3 Feb 2019	1. HNL	(Croatia) Simon Sluga	Gorica	✓
22 Feb 2019	1. HNL	(Croatia) Simon Sluga	Rudeš	✓
6 May 2017	1. HNL	(Croatia) Andrej Prskalo	Lokomotiva	✓
22 May 2019	Cup	(Croatia) Simon Sluga	Dinamo Zagreb	✗

=== Overview of statistics ===
Statistic	Overall	1. HNL	Croatian Cup	Europa League
Most appearances	Sluga (41)	Sluga (35)	Čolak, Kvržić & Pavičić (5)	13 players (2)
Most starts	Sluga (41)	Sluga (35)	Kvržić (5)	11 players (2)
Most substitute appearances	Puljić (13)	Acosty (11)	Čolak, Gorgon, Lončar & Puljić (2)	Čolak & Kvržić (2)
Most minutes played	Sluga (3,690)	Sluga (3,150)	Kvržić (450)	8 players (180)
Top goalscorer	Čolak (19)	Puljić (16)	Čolak (7)	Gorgon (1)
Most assists	Kvržić (15)	Kvržić (11)	Kvržić (4)	Acosty (1)
Most yellow cards	7 players (5)	Mamić & Pavičić (5)	12 players (1)	Čanađija, Héber & Zuta (1)
Most red cards	Lončar, Pavičić, Punčec & Raspopović (1)	Lončar, Pavičić, Punčec & Raspopović (1)	(0)	(0)
Last updated: 25 May 2019.

== Transfers ==
=== In ===
Date	Pos.	Player	Moving from	Type	Fee	Ref.
14 Jun 2018	DM	(Croatia) Bernardo Matić	(Bosnia and Herzegovina) Široki Brijeg	Return from loan	—N/a	
14 Jun 2018	GK	(Croatia) Ivan Nevistić	(Croatia) Varaždin	Return from loan	—N/a	
15 Jun 2018	CB	(Nigeria) Bamidele Samuel Ayodeji	(Croatia) Varaždin	Return from loan	—N/a	
15 Jun 2018	DM	(Nigeria) Gerald Diyoke	(Slovenia) Krško	Return from loan	—N/a	
15 Jun 2018	LB	(Nigeria) Muhammed Kabiru	(Croatia) Varaždin	Return from loan	—N/a	
15 Jun 2018	CM	(Croatia) Dominik Križanović	(Croatia) Cibalia	Return from loan	—N/a	
15 Jun 2018	CF	(Nigeria) Theophilus Solomon	(Cyprus) Omonia	Return from loan	—N/a	
15 Jun 2018	AM	(Croatia) Matej Šantek	(Slovenia) Gorica	Return from loan	—N/a	
15 Jun 2018	RW	(Croatia) Tomislav Turčin	(Croatia) Rudeš	Return from loan	—N/a	
29 Jun 2018	SS	(Croatia) Jakov Puljić	(Croatia) Inter Zaprešić	Transfer (buying obligation)	Undisclosed	
30 Jun 2018	LB	(Australia) Jason Davidson	(Slovenia) Olimpija Ljubljana	Return from loan	—N/a	
30 Jun 2018	CM	(Croatia) Dario Čanađija	(Slovenia) Olimpija Ljubljana	Return from loan	—N/a	
30 Jun 2018	CM	(Croatia) Tomislav Gomelt	(Spain) Lorca	Return from loan	—N/a	
30 Jun 2018	LW	(Nigeria) Goodness Ajayi	(Israel) Hapoel Ashkelon	Return from loan	—N/a	
5 Jul 2018	LB	(Croatia) Petar Mamić	(Croatia) Inter Zaprešić	Transfer	Undisclosed	
10 Jul 2018	RW	(North Macedonia) Milan Ristovski	(North Macedonia) Rabotnichki	Transfer (buying option)	Undisclosed	
13 Jul 2018	CM	(Bosnia and Herzegovina) Stjepan Lončar	(Bosnia and Herzegovina) Široki Brijeg	Transfer	Undisclosed	
13 Jul 2018	RB	(Montenegro) Momčilo Raspopović	(Montenegro) Budućnost	Transfer (buying option)	Undisclosed	
13 Jul 2018	CB	(North Macedonia) Darko Velkovski	(North Macedonia) Vardar	Transfer	Free	
13 Jul 2018	RB	(Austria) Mario Pavelić	(Austria) Rapid Wien	Transfer	Free	
13 Jul 2018	CB	(Croatia) Dario Župarić	(Italy) Pescara	Transfer (buying option)	€800,000	
13 Jul 2018	RW	(Ghana) Maxwell Acosty	(Italy) Crotone	Transfer (buying obligation)	Undisclosed	
30 Dec 2018	CB	(Nigeria) Bamidele Samuel Ayodeji	(Croatia) Varaždin	Return from loan	—N/a	
31 Dec 2018	DM	(Nigeria) Gerald Diyoke	(Croatia) Dugopolje	Return from loan	—N/a	
25 Jan 2019	LW	(Croatia) Matej Vuk	(Croatia) Inter Zaprešić	Return from loan	—N/a	
28 Jan 2019	CM	(Croatia) Tibor Halilović	(Poland) Wisła Kraków	Transfer	Free	
28 Jan 2019	GK	(Croatia) Ivan Nevistić	(Slovenia) Mura	Return from loan	—N/a	
5 Feb 2019	RW	(Croatia) Robert Murić	(Portugal) Braga	Transfer	Free	
8 Feb 2019	RB	(Croatia) Ivan Tomečak	(Belgium) Club Brugge	Transfer	Free	
12 Feb 2019	RW	(North Macedonia) Milan Ristovski	(Slovenia) Krško	Return from loan	—N/a	
15 Feb 2019	CM	(Croatia) Ivan Lepinjica	(Croatia) Zadar	Return from loan	—N/a	

Source: Glasilo Hrvatskog nogometnog saveza

=== Out ===
Date	Pos.	Player	Moving to	Type	Fee	Ref.
15 Jun 2018	GK	(Nigeria) Ayotunde Ikuepamitan	(Croatia) Primorac BnM	End of contract	Free	
15 Jun 2018	DM	(Croatia) Bernardo Matić	(Bosnia and Herzegovina) Široki Brijeg	End of contract	Free	
15 Jun 2018	AM	(Croatia) Anas Sharbini	(Croatia) Grobničan	End of contract	Free	
28 Jun 2018	RW	(Croatia) Tomislav Turčin	(Bosnia and Herzegovina) Široki Brijeg	Loan (until 15/6/2019)	—N/a	
30 Jun 2018	LB	(Nigeria) Muhammed Kabiru	TBC	End of contract	Free	
30 Jun 2018	LB	(Croatia) Marin Leovac	(Greece) PAOK	End of loan	—N/a	
30 Jun 2018	RB	(Greece) Charalampos Mavrias	(Scotland) Hibernian	End of contract	Free	
30 Jun 2018	CB	(Croatia) Dario Župarić	(Italy) Pescara	End of loan	—N/a	
4 Jul 2018	RW	(Croatia) Marin Tomasov	(Kazakhstan) Astana	Transfer (buying option)	€500,000	
30 Jun 2018	CF	(Croatia) Matej Jelić	(Austria) Rapid Wien	End of loan	—N/a	
5 Jul 2018	LW	(Slovenia) Matic Črnic	(Slovenia) Olimpija Ljubljana	Transfer	€250,000	
6 Jul 2018	CF	(Nigeria) Theophilus Solomon	(Croatia) Inter Zaprešić	Transfer	Undisclosed	
6 Jul 2018	LW	(Nigeria) Goodness Ajayi	(Croatia) Inter Zaprešić	Transfer	Undisclosed	
6 Jul 2018	DM	(Bosnia and Herzegovina) Jasmin Čeliković	(Croatia) Inter Zaprešić	Loan (until 15/6/2019)	—N/a	
6 Jul 2018	LW	(Croatia) Matej Vuk	(Croatia) Inter Zaprešić	Loan (until 15/6/2019)	—N/a	
10 Jul 2018	CF	(Croatia) Filip Dangubić	(Slovakia) Spartak Trnava	Transfer	Undisclosed	
10 Jul 2018	RW	(North Macedonia) Milan Ristovski	(Slovenia) Krško	Loan (until 15/6/2019)	—N/a	
10 Jul 2018	LB	(Croatia) Daniel Štefulj	(Slovenia) Krško	Loan (until 15/6/2019)	—N/a	
13 Jul 2018	GK	(Croatia) Ivan Nevistić	(Slovenia) Mura	Loan (until 15/6/2019)	—N/a	
13 Jul 2018	AM	(Croatia) Matej Šantek	(Slovenia) Rudar Velenje	Transfer	Undisclosed	
18 Jul 2018	LB	(Australia) Jason Davidson	(Australia) Perth Glory	Transfer	Free	
19 Jul 2018	GK	(Nigeria) David Samuel Nwolokor	(Slovakia) Sereď	Loan (until 30/6/2019)	—N/a	
20 Jul 2018	CB	(Croatia) Josip Elez	(Germany) Hannover 96	Transfer (buying obligation)	€2,500,000	
23 Jul 2018	CM	(Croatia) Tomislav Gomelt	(Romania) Dinamo București	Transfer	Free	
3 Aug 2018	CF	(Croatia) Emanuel Črnko	(Croatia) Varaždin	Loan (until 14/6/2019)	—N/a	
3 Aug 2018	CB	(Croatia) Luka Mikulica	(Croatia) Opatija	Loan (until 14/6/2019)	—N/a	
6 Aug 2018	CM	(Croatia) Filip Bradarić	(Italy) Cagliari	Transfer	€6,000,000	
10 Aug 2018	DM	(Nigeria) Gerald Diyoke	(Croatia) Dugopolje	Loan (until 31/12/2018)	—N/a	
16 Aug 2018	CM	(Croatia) Ivan Lepinjica	(Croatia) Zadar	Loan (until 15/6/2019)	—N/a	
17 Aug 2018	CB	(Nigeria) Bamidele Samuel Ayodeji	(Croatia) Varaždin	Loan (until 30/12/2018)	—N/a	
20 Aug 2018	CF	(Bulgaria) Valeri Bojinov	(Bulgaria) Botev Vratsa	Released (mutual consent)	Free	
22 Aug 2018	AM	(Romania) Florentin Matei	(United Arab Emirates) Al-Ittihad Kalba	Transfer	€430,000	
31 Dec 2018	DM	(Bosnia and Herzegovina) Srđan Grahovac	(Kazakhstan) Astana	End of loan	—N/a	
31 Dec 2018	CB	(Nigeria) Bamidele Samuel Ayodeji	(Nigeria) Niger Tornadoes	End of contract	Free	
14 Jan 2019	LB	(North Macedonia) Leonard Zuta	(Turkey) Konyaspor	Transfer	€400,000	
4 Feb 2019	CM	(Croatia) Dario Čanađija	(Croatia) Slaven Belupo	Released (mutual consent)	Free	
15 Feb 2019	GK	(Croatia) Ivan Nevistić	(Croatia) Varaždin	Loan (until 15/6/2019)	—N/a	
28 Mar 2019	CF	(Brazil) Héber	(United States) New York City FC	Transfer	€2,500,000	

Source: Glasilo Hrvatskog nogometnog saveza

Spending: ▼€800,000
Income: ▲€12,580,000
Expenditure: ▲€11,780,000
