= 2019–20 HNK Gorica season =

HNK Gorica
2019–20 season
- Chairman: Nenad Črnko
- Manager: Sergej Jakirović (until 24 February 2020); Valdas Dambrauskas (since 25 February 2020)
- Stadium: Stadion Radnik
- Prva HNL: 6th
- Croatian Cup: Quarter-finals
- Top goalscorer: League: Kristijan Lovrić (14); All: Kristijan Lovrić (16)
- Highest home attendance: 4,003 v Dinamo Zagreb (18 October 2019)
- Lowest home attendance: 250 v Zagreb (25 September 2019)
- Average home league attendance: 1,748

The 2019–20 HNK Gorica season was the club's 11th season in existence and the 2nd consecutive season in the top flight of Croatian football.

== First-team squad ==
As of 24 July 2020

Note: Flags indicate national team as defined under FIFA eligibility rules; some limited exceptions apply. Players may hold more than one non-FIFA nationality.

| No. | Pos. | Nation | Player |
|---|---|---|---|
| 1 | GK | CRO | Kristijan Kahlina (Captain) |
| 2 | DF | NGR | Musa Muhammed |
| 3 | DF | BIH | Aleksandar Jovičić |
| 4 | DF | NED | Matthew Steenvoorden |
| 5 | DF | CRO | Maks Juraj Čelić |
| 6 | MF | POL | Michał Masłowski |
| 7 | MF | IRQ | Jiloan Hamad |
| 8 | MF | NED | Joey Suk |
| 9 | FW | SRB | Ognjen Mudrinski (on loan from Jagiellonia Białystok) |
| 10 | MF | CRO | Matija Dvorneković |
| 11 | FW | CRO | Dario Špikić |
| 18 | MF | CRO | Martin Šroler |
| 19 | DF | CRO | Marijan Čabraja |

| No. | Pos. | Nation | Player |
|---|---|---|---|
| 20 | MF | CRO | Hrvoje Babec |
| 21 | MF | LTU | Paulius Golubickas (on loan from Dainava) |
| 22 | MF | CRO | Gojko Gadže |
| 23 | MF | AUS | Anthony Kalik |
| 25 | DF | CRO | Krešimir Krizmanić |
| 31 | GK | CRO | Ivan Banić |
| 32 | GK | CRO | Ivan Čović |
| 36 | DF | CRO | Juraj Spudić |
| 44 | FW | CRO | Kristijan Lovrić |
| 45 | DF | GHA | Nasiru Moro |
| 50 | GK | CRO | Leon Išek |
| 77 | MF | CRO | Dario Čanađija |
| 99 | FW | SEN | Cherif Ndiaye |

== Transfers ==
=== In ===
| Pos | Player | Transferred from | Fee | Date | Source |
|---|---|---|---|---|---|
| DF | (Ghana) Nasiru Moro | (Ghana) Accra Lions | Free | 27 May 2019 | |
| MF | (Croatia) Dinko Matošević | (Croatia) Hrvatski Dragovoljac | Back from loan | 1 June 2019 | |
| MF | (Croatia) Adrian Zenko | (Croatia) Sesvete | Back from loan | 1 June 2019 | |
| MF | (Croatia) Maks Juraj Čelić | (Croatia) Varaždin | Free | 13 June 2019 | |
| DF | (Netherlands) Matthew Steenvoorden | (Netherlands) SC Cambuur | Free | 7 July 2019 | |
| MF | (Croatia) Hrvoje Babec | (Croatia) Vihor Jelisavac | Free | 15 July 2019 | |
| DF | (Croatia) Patrik Periša | (Croatia) BSK Bijelo Brdo | Free | 19 July 2019 | |
| MF | (Iraq) Jiloan Hamad | No team | Free | 13 August 2019 | |
| MF | (Croatia) Dario Čanađija | (Croatia) Slaven Belupo | Free | 20 August 2019 | |
| MF | (South Korea) Min-jae Kwak | (South Korea) TNT Fitogether | Free | 9 September 2019 | |
| FW | (South Korea) Hyung-min Kang | (South Korea) TNT Fitogether | Free | 9 September 2019 | |
| MF | (Lithuania) Paulius Golubickas | (Lithuania) Dainava | Loan | 11 January 2020 | |
| FW | (Croatia) Dario Špikić | (Croatia) Hajduk Split | Free | 18 January 2020 | |
| MF | (Croatia) Gojko Gadže | (Croatia) Jarun | Free | 7 February 2020 | |
| MF | (Australia) Anthony Kalik | (Croatia) Hajduk Split | Free | 17 February 2020 | |
| FW | (Serbia) Ognjen Mudrinski | (Poland) Jagiellonia Białystok | Loan | 17 February 2020 | |
| GK | (Croatia) Ivan Banić | No team | Free | 30 April 2020 | |
| DF | (Ghana) Nasiru Moro | (Croatia) Sesvete | Back from loan | 4 June 2020 | |
| DF | (Croatia) Juraj Spudić | (Croatia) Kurilovec | Back from loan | 4 June 2020 | |
| MF | (Croatia) Martin Šroler | (Croatia) Sesvete | Back from loan | 4 June 2020 | |

Source: Glasilo Hrvatskog nogometnog saveza

=== Out ===
| Pos | Player | Transferred to | Fee | Date | Source |
|---|---|---|---|---|---|
| DF | (Ghana) Nasiru Moro | (Ghana) Accra Lions | Back from loan | 26 May 2019 | |
| MF | (Ghana) Ahmed Ramzy Yussif | (Ghana) Accra Lions | Back from loan | 26 May 2019 | |
| DF | (Georgia (country)) Giorgi Mchedlishvili | (Latvia) Ventspils | Free | 1 June 2019 | |
| DF | (Nigeria) Godfrey Oboabona | No team | Free | 1 June 2019 | |
| DF | (Croatia) Igor Čagalj | No team | Free | 19 June 2019 | |
| MF | (South Korea) Min-jae Kwak | No team | Free | 1 July 2020 | |
| MF | (Croatia) Adrian Zenko | No team | Free | 1 July 2020 | |
| FW | (South Korea) Hyung-min Kang | No team | Free | 1 July 2020 | |
| DF | (Ghana) Nasiru Moro | (Croatia) Sesvete | Loan | 17 July 2019 | |
| DF | (Croatia) Juraj Spudić | (Croatia) Kurilovec | Loan | 17 July 2019 | |
| MF | (Romania) Ronaldo Deaconu | (Romania) Sepsi OSK | 100,000 € | 8 August 2019 | |
| MF | (Uganda) Farouk Miya | (Turkey) Konyaspor | 1,700,000 € | 20 August 2019 | |
| MF | (Croatia) Mario Marina | (Azerbaijan) Sabah | 100,000 € | 28 December 2019 | |
| DF | (Croatia) Matija Špičić | (Croatia) Varaždin | Free | 9 January 2020 | |
| DF | (Serbia) Nemanja Ljubisavljević | (Lithuania) Žalgiris | Free | 24 January 2020 | |
| MF | (Croatia) Martin Šroler | (Croatia) Sesvete | Loan | 29 January 2020 | |
| FW | (Poland) Łukasz Zwoliński | (Poland) Lechia Gdańsk | 350,000 € | 8 February 2020 | |
| MF | (Netherlands) Justin Mathieu | No team | Free | 24 April 2020 | |
| DF | (Croatia) Igor Blagojević | No team | Free | 1 June 2020 | |
| DF | (Croatia) Patrik Periša | No team | Free | 1 June 2020 | |
| MF | (Croatia) Martin Maloča | No team | Free | 1 June 2020 | |
| FW | (Croatia) Antonio Bakula | No team | Free | 1 June 2020 | |

Source: Glasilo Hrvatskog nogometnog saveza

Total spending: ▼0 €

Total income: ▲2,250,000 €

Total expenditure: ▲2,250,000 €

== Competitions ==
=== Overview ===
| Competition | First match | Last match | Starting round | Final position | Record | | | | | | | |
| Competition | First match | Last match | Starting round | Final position | Pld | W | D | L | GF | GA | GD | Win % |
|---|---|---|---|---|---|---|---|---|---|---|---|---|
| HT Prva liga | 20 July 2019 | 24 July 2020 | Matchday 1 | 6th | 36 | 12 | 13 | 11 | 44 | 48 | −4 | 33.33 |
| Croatian Cup | 28 August 2019 | 4 December 2019 | Preliminary round | Quarter-finals | 4 | 3 | 0 | 1 | 21 | 3 | +18 | 75.00 |
| Total | | | | | 40 | 15 | 13 | 12 | 65 | 51 | +14 | 37.50 |

Last updated: 3 June 2021
Source: Soccerway

=== HT Prva liga ===
==== League table ====
| Pos | Team | Pld | W | D | L | GF | GA | GD | Pts | Qualification or relegation |
|---|---|---|---|---|---|---|---|---|---|---|
| 4 | Osijek | 36 | 17 | 11 | 8 | 47 | 29 | +18 | 62 | Qualification for the Europa League second qualifying round |
| 5 | Hajduk Split | 36 | 18 | 6 | 12 | 60 | 41 | +19 | 60 | Qualification for the Europa League second qualifying round |
| 6 | Gorica | 36 | 12 | 13 | 11 | 44 | 48 | −4 | 49 | |
| 7 | Slaven Belupo | 36 | 10 | 9 | 17 | 34 | 51 | −17 | 39 | |
| 8 | Varaždin | 36 | 9 | 9 | 18 | 29 | 50 | −21 | 36 | |

Source: PrvaHNL.hr
Rules for classification: 1) Points; 2) Head-to-head points; 3) Head-to-head goal difference; 4) Head-to-head goals scored (at home if two teams tied); 5) Goal difference; 6) Goals scored; 7) Play-off
(Note: Criteria 2-4 and 7 is only used if deciding champion, teams to international competition or teams for relegation and in that case criteria 6 will not be used).

==== Results summary ====
| Overall | | | | | | | | Home | | | | | | Away | | | | | |
| Pld | W | D | L | GF | GA | GD | Pts | W | D | L | GF | GA | GD | W | D | L | GF | GA | GD |
|---|---|---|---|---|---|---|---|---|---|---|---|---|---|---|---|---|---|---|---|
| 36 | 12 | 13 | 11 | 44 | 48 | −4 | 49 | 7 | 8 | 3 | 22 | 14 | +8 | 5 | 5 | 8 | 22 | 34 | −12 |

Last updated: 3 June 2021.
Source: Prva HNL

==== Results by round ====
| Round | 1 | 2 | 3 | 4 | 5 | 6 | 7 | 8 | 9 | 10 | 11 | 12 | 13 | 14 | 15 | 16 | 17 | 18 | 19 | 20 | 21 | 22 | 23 | 24 | 25 | 26 | 27 | 28 | 29 | 30 | 31 | 32 | 33 | 34 | 35 | 36 |
|---|---|---|---|---|---|---|---|---|---|---|---|---|---|---|---|---|---|---|---|---|---|---|---|---|---|---|---|---|---|---|---|---|---|---|---|---|
| Ground | H | H | A | H | A | H | A | H | A | A | A | H | A | H | A | H | A | H | H | H | A | H | A | H | A | H | A | A | A | H | A | H | A | H | A | H |
| Result | D | W | L | W | L | D | W | D | L | W | L | L | W | W | D | W | L | W | D | D | L | D | L | W | D | L | D | W | L | D | W | W | D | L | D | D |
| Position | 6 | 4 | 6 | 4 | 5 | 5 | 4 | 4 | 6 | 5 | 5 | 6 | 6 | 6 | 5 | 6 | 6 | 6 | 5 | 6 | 6 | 6 | 6 | 6 | 6 | 6 | 6 | 6 | 6 | 6 | 6 | 6 | 6 | 6 | 6 | 6 |

Updated to match(es) played on 24 July 2020. Source: Prva HNL
A = Away; H = Home; W = Win; D = Draw; L = Loss

==== Matches ====
| 20 July 2019 1 | Gorica | 1–1 | Inter Zaprešić | Velika Gorica |
| 21:00 CEST (UTC+02:00) | Masłowski 35' | Report | Mazalović (yellow card) 34'; Serderov (yellow card) 39'; Bosec 58' | Stadium: Stadion Radnik; Attendance: 1,647; Referee: Ivan Bebek |

| 28 July 2019 2 | Gorica | 3–1 | Osijek | Velika Gorica |
| 18:00 CEST (UTC+02:00) | Jovičić (yellow card) 16'; Ndiaye 35' 75'; Dvorneković (yellow card) 37'; Marina (yellow card) 51'; Miya 53' (yellow card) 64'; Lovrić (yellow card) 57'; Masłowski (yellow card) 60' | Report | Dugandžić (yellow card) 1'; Šimunec (yellow card) 19'; Lyopa (yellow card) 40'; Lončar (yellow card) 40'; Kleinheisler (yellow card) 63'; Marić 90' | Stadium: Stadion Radnik; Attendance: 1,280; Referee: Ivan Vučković |

| 2 August 2019 3 | Dinamo Zagreb | 3–1 | Gorica | Zagreb |
| 20:00 CEST (UTC+02:00) | Olmo 22'; Moro 57'; Gojak 83'; Atiemwen (yellow card) 90+3' | Report | Čelić (yellow card) 15'; Lovrić (yellow card) 40', (goal) 86'; Muhammed (yellow card) 61'; Suk (yellow card) 78'; Marina (yellow card) 84' | Stadium: Stadion Maksimir; Attendance: 2,676; Referee: Mario Zebec |

| 11 August 2019 4 | Gorica | 2–0 | Rijeka | Velika Gorica |
| 20:00 CEST (UTC+02:00) | Mathieu (yellow card) 40'; Ndiaye 45+1'; Musa (yellow card) 47'; Suk 67' | Report | Punčec (yellow card) 49'; Iglesias (yellow card) 75'; Lepinjica (yellow card) 77' | Stadium: Stadion Radnik; Attendance: 2,893; Referee: Dario Bel |

| 18 August 2019 5 | Hajduk Split | 3–0 | Gorica | Split |
| 18:00 CEST (UTC+02:00) | Jairo 30', 67'; Eduok (yellow card) 32'; Caktaš (yellow card) 45+1'; Ismajli (yellow card) 45+2'; Kalik (yellow card) 56'; Hamza (yellow card) 64'; Juranović 69' | Report | Lovrić (yellow card) 30'; Čabraja (yellow card) 30'; Dvorneković (yellow card) 45+1'; Steenvoorden (yellow card) 45+1'; Ndiaye (yellow card) 45+1' (yellow-red card) 60' | Stadium: Stadion Poljud; Attendance: 14,054; Referee: Marin Vidulin |

| 25 August 2019 6 | Gorica | 1–1 | Istra 1961 | Velika Gorica |
| 18:00 CEST (UTC+02:00) | Suk (yellow card) 45'; Hamad 53'; Zwoliński (yellow card) 66' | Report | Bosančić 6'; Galilea (yellow card) 74' | Stadium: Stadion Radnik; Attendance: 2,431; Referee: Ivan Bebek |

| 1 September 2019 7 | Varaždin | 1–3 | Gorica | Varaždin |
| 18:00 CEST (UTC+02:00) | Senić (yellow card) 19'; Benko 37' (yellow card) 45' | Report | Lovrić 20' 56' 71'; Ndiaye (yellow card) 27'; Suk (yellow card) 39'; Steenvoorden (yellow card) 63' | Stadium: Stadion Varteks; Attendance: 1,854; Referee: Ivan Župan |

| 14 September 2019 8 | Gorica | 0–0 | Lokomotiva | Velika Gorica |
| 19:00 CEST (UTC+02:00) | Marina (yellow card) 89' | Report | Moharrami (yellow card) 15'; Kolinger (yellow card) 74'; Çokaj (yellow card) 80' | Stadium: Stadion Radnik; Attendance: 2,239; Referee: Mario Zebec |

| 21 September 2019 9 | Slaven Belupo | 2–0 | Gorica | Koprivnica |
| 16:30 CEST (UTC+02:00) | Steenvoorden 28' (o.g.); Nowak (yellow card) 30'; Bogojević (yellow card) 80'; Krstanović 86' (pen.) | Report | Lovrić (yellow card) 42' (yellow-red card) 90'; Čanađija (yellow card) 56'; Zwoliński (yellow card) 82'; Čabraja (red card) 84' | Stadium: Gradski stadion Attendance: 756; Referee: Fran Jović |

| 29 September 2019 10 | Inter Zaprešić | 0–2 | Gorica | Zaprešić |
| 15:30 CEST (UTC+02:00) | Mlinar (yellow card) 18'; Serderov (yellow card) 20'; Postonjski (yellow card) 48'; Mitrović (yellow card) 90+4' | Report | Muhammed (yellow card) 13'; Marina (yellow card) 28' (yellow-red card) 53'; Čabraja 31'; Zwoliński 57'; Suk (yellow card) 90+2' | Stadium: Ivan Laljak-Ivić Stadium; Attendance: 553; Referee: Mario Zebec |

| 5 October 2019 11 | Osijek | 2–1 | Gorica | Osijek |
| 19:00 CEST (UTC+02:00) | Šutalo (yellow card) 46'; Lyopa (yellow card) 52'; Kleinheisler (yellow card) 60'; Marić 66' (pen.); Mance 75'; Majstorović (yellow card) 82'; Ivušić (yellow card) 90'; Talys (yellow card) 90+3'; Igor Silva (yellow card) 90+4' | Report | Čanađija (yellow card) 1'; Čabraja (yellow card) 36'; Ljubisavljević (yellow card) 45' (yellow-red card) 65'; Lovrić 54' (yellow card) 84'; Suk (yellow card) 75' | Stadium: Gradski Vrt Stadium; Attendance: 2,212; Referee: Ivan Vučković |

| 18 October 2019 12 | Gorica | 2–4 | Dinamo Zagreb | Velika Gorica |
| 18:00 CEST (UTC+02:00) | Lovrić 55'; Muhammed (yellow card) 59'; Čelić (yellow card) 77'; Suk 77' | Report | Oršić 25', 49', 61'; Kądzior 27'; Šitum (yellow card) 54'; Perić (yellow card) 65' (yellow-red card) 89' | Stadium: Stadion Radnik; Attendance: 4,003; Referee: Mario Zebec |

| 26 October 2019 13 | Rijeka | 1–2 | Gorica | Rijeka |
| 17:30 CEST (UTC+02:00) | Smolčić (yellow card) 68' (yellow-red card) 90'; Tomečak 82' | Report | Zwoliński 62' (yellow card) 63'; Čelić (yellow card) 88'; Lovrić (yellow card) 89'; Dvorneković 90+2' | Stadium: Stadion Rujevica; Attendance: 4,117; Referee: Duje Strukan |

| 2 November 2019 14 | Gorica | 2–1 | Hajduk Split | Velika Gorica |
| 17:30 CET (UTC+01:00) | Lovrić 11' (yellow card) 67'; Suk (yellow card) 51' (yellow-red card) 90+2' (goal) 86'; Musa Muhammed (yellow card) 71'; Marina (yellow card) 82' | Report | Jairo 28'; Ismajli (yellow card) 72'; Caktaš (yellow card) 85'; Bradarć (yellow card) 88' | Stadium: Stadion Radnik; Attendance: 3,753; Referee: Tihomir Pejin |

| 8 November 2019 15 | Istra 1961 | 2–2 | Gorica | Pula |
| 18:00 CET (UTC+01:00) | Laukžemis 3' (yellow card) 74'; Močinić 62' | Report | Steenvoorden (yellow card) 16'; Jovičić 37'; Čanađija (yellow card) 58'; Muhammed (yellow card) 77'; Marina (yellow card) 90'; Ndiaye 90+4' | Stadium: Stadion Aldo Drosina; Attendance: 699; Referee: Duje Strukan |

| 23 November 2019 16 | Gorica | 1–0 | Varaždin | Velika Gorica |
| 15:00 CET (UTC+01:00) | Ndiaye 57'; Dvorneković (yellow card) 62' | Report | Milićević (yellow card) 38'; Senić (yellow card) 76'; Stolnik (yellow card) 78'; Posavec (yellow card) 89' | Stadium: Stadion Radnik; Attendance: 1,272; Referee: Dario Bel |

| 29 November 2019 17 | Lokomotiva | 4–0 | Gorica | Zagreb |
| 19:00 CET (UTC+01:00) | Kolinger (yellow card) 19'; Kastrati 40'; Uzuni 41'; Marina (yellow card) 45' 63' (o.g.); Çokaj (yellow card) 59' | Report | Suk (yellow card) 1'; Čanađija (yellow card) 53' | Stadium: Stadion Kranjčevićeva; Attendance: 583; Referee: Damir Batinić |

| 7 December 2019 18 | Gorica | 2–0 | Slaven Belupo | Velika Gorica |
| 15:00 CET (UTC+01:00) | Čanađija (yellow card) 16'; Zwoliński 18'; Lovrić 34'; Ndiaye (yellow card) 39' (yellow-red card) 53'; Jovičić (yellow card) 84' | Report | Goda (red card) 9'; Mikulić (yellow card) 36'; Radivojević (yellow card) 67'; Bačelić-Grgić (yellow card) 84'; Lulić (yellow card) 90' | Stadium: Stadion Radnik; Attendance: 793; Referee: Ivan Vučković |

| 13 December 2019 19 | Gorica | 1–1 | Inter Zaprešić | Velika Gorica |
| 18:00 CET (UTC+01:00) | Zwoliński 1'; Muhammed (yellow card) 43' (yellow-red card) 45'; Suk (yellow card) 45+1'; Periša (yellow card) 83' | Report | Soldo (yellow card) 26'; Tsonev (yellow card) 57' (goal) 69'; Tatomirović (yellow card) 90' | Stadium: Stadion Radnik; Attendance: 689; Referee: Fran Jović |

| 2 February 2020 20 | Gorica | 0–0 | Osijek | Velika Gorica |
| 17:30 CEST (UTC+02:00) | Čabraja (yellow card) 44'; Lovrić (yellow card) 47' | Report | Pilj (yellow card) 41'; Majstorović (yellow card) 62'; Škorić (yellow card) 83' | Stadium: Stadion Radnik; Attendance: 1,817; Referee: Duje Strukan |

| 9 February 2020 21 | Dinamo Zagreb | 2–0 | Gorica | Zagreb |
| 17:30 CET (UTC+01:00) | Théophile-Catherine 72'; Kądzior 86' | Report | Suk (yellow card) 11' (yellow-red card) 50'; Špikić (yellow card) 44'; Krizmanić (yellow card) 69' | Stadium: Stadion Maksimir; Attendance: 2,415; Referee: Dario Bel |

| 16 February 2020 22 | Gorica | 0–0 | Rijeka | Velika Gorica |
| 17:30 CET (UTC+01:00) | Čabraja (yellow card) 26'; Čanađija (yellow card) 46'; Jovičić (yellow card) 79'; Lovrić (yellow card) 81' | Report | Halilović (yellow card) 19'; Escoval (yellow card) 49'; Smolčić (yellow card) 61'; Velkovski (yellow card) 81'; Čolak (yellow card) 90+1' | Stadium: Stadion Radnik; Attendance: 2,137; Referee: Fran Jović |

| 22 February 2020 23 | Hajduk Split | 6–0 | Gorica | Split |
| 15:00 CET (UTC+01:00) | Kreković 10'; Jairo 35', 56' (pen.); Caktaš 39', 47'; Eduok 80'; Dimitrov (yellow card) 90+2' | Report | Čabraja (yellow card) 9'; Kalik (yellow card) 54'; Mathieu (yellow card) 65' | Stadium: Stadion Poljud; Attendance: 8,487; Referee: Ivan Bebek |

| 28 February 2020 24 | Gorica | 3–0 | Istra 1961 | Velika Gorica |
| 19:00 CET (UTC+01:00) | Čanađija (yellow card) 40'; Dvorneković 57'; Masłowski 80'; Lovrić 90+3' | Report | Blagojević (yellow card) 21'; Galilea (yellow card) 28'; R. Páez (yellow card) 49'; Grujević (yellow card) 82' | Stadium: Stadion Radnik; Attendance: 791; Referee: Tihomir Pejin |

| 4 March 2020 25 | Varaždin | 2–2 | Gorica | Varaždin |
| 17:00 CET (UTC+01:00) | Kolarić (yellow card) 2'; Čanađija 31' (o.g.); Benko 34' (yellow card) 81'; Mamić (yellow card) 37'; Ninčević (yellow card) 90'; Stolnik (yellow card) 90+4' | Report | Lovrić 65' 90+4' (pen.); Suk (yellow card) 66' | Stadium: Stadion Varteks; Attendance: 1,411; Referee: Damir Batinić |

| 9 March 2020 26 | Gorica | 1–3 | Lokomotiva | Velika Gorica |
| 18:00 CET (UTC+01:00) | Steenvoorden 53'; Lovrić (yellow card) 66' | Report | Atiemwen 61'; Uzuni 75' 87' | Stadium: Stadion Radnik; Attendance: 1,357; Referee: Mario Zebec |

| 6 June 2019 27 | Slaven Belupo | 0–0 | Gorica | Koprivnica |
| 18:55 CEST (UTC+02:00) | Lulić (yellow card) 32'; Paracki (yellow card) 42' | Report | Kalik (yellow card) 33'; Šroler (yellow card) 83' | Stadium: Gradski stadion Attendance: 0 Referee: Marin Vidulin |

| 11 June 2019 27 | Inter Zaprešić | 0–3 | Gorica | Zaprešić |
| 18:55 CEST (UTC+02:00) | Mitrović (yellow card) 73'; Savić (yellow card) 81' | Report | Masłowski (yellow card) 20'; Ndiaye (yellow card) 40'; Lovrić 53'; Mudrinski 78' 84' | Stadium: Ivan Laljak-Ivić Stadium; Attendance: 0 Referee: Marin Vidulin |

| 17 June 2019 28 | Osijek | 2–1 | Gorica | Osijek |
| 21:05 CEST (UTC+02:00) | Marić 35'; Žaper 57'; Jugović (yellow card) 62'; Špoljarić (yellow card) 71'; Pilj (yellow card) 90+1' | Report | Steenvoorden (yellow card) 40'; Lovrić (yellow card) 59' (goal) 90+2'; Muhammed (yellow card) 90+4' | Stadium: Gradski Vrt Stadium; Attendance: 1,833; Referee: Mario Zebec |

| 20 June 2020 30 | Gorica | 0–0 | Dinamo Zagreb | Velika Gorica |
| 21:05 CEST (UTC+02:00) | Babec (yellow card) 4'; Lovrić (yellow card) 32'; Čabraja (yellow card) 90+2' | Report | Gvardiol (yellow card) 43'; Moubandje (yellow card) 58' | Stadium: Stadion Radnik; Attendance: 1,705; Referee: Marin Vidulin |

| 26 June 2020 31 | Rijeka | 1–2 | Gorica | Rijeka |
| 18:55 CEST (UTC+02:00) | Capan (yellow card) 11'; Escoval (yellow card) 49'; Lončar (yellow card) 67'; Pires 84' | Report | Lovrić 12' (pen.); Kalik (yellow card) 24'; Ndiaye 79'; Krizmanić (yellow card) 88' | Stadium: Stadion Rujevica; Attendance: 2,071; Referee: Ivan Vučković |

| 30 June 2020 32 | Gorica | 3–1 | Hajduk Split | Velika Gorica |
| 21:05 CEST (UTC+02:00) | Hamad 8'; Suk 43'; M.Musa (yellow card) 45'; Ndiaye 53'; Jovičić (yellow card) 55' | Report | Ismajli (yellow card) 34'; Jakoliš 45' | Stadium: Stadion Radnik; Attendance: 1,700; Referee: Ivan Bebek |

| 4 July 2020 33 | Istra 1961 | 2–2 | Gorica | Pula |
| 18:55 CEST (UTC+02:00) | Grujević (yellow card) 6'; Gržan 45+2'; Delić 81'; Tomašević (yellow card) 90+4' | Report | Kalik (yellow card) 15'; Lovrić (yellow card) 21'; Babec (yellow card) 44'; Hamad 49'; Mudrinski 51'; Steenvoorden (yellow card) 69' | Stadium: Stadion Aldo Drosina; Attendance: 742; Referee: Ante Čuljak |

| 10 July 2020 34 | Gorica | 0–1 | Varaždin | Velika Gorica |
| 20:00 CEST (UTC+02:00) | Dvorneković (yellow card) 75'; Ndiaye (yellow card) 82'; Kalik (yellow card) 90+6' | Report | Drožđek 76' (pen.); Kolarić (yellow card) 78' | Stadium: Stadion Radnik; Attendance: 953; Referee: Ivan Župan |

| 19 July 2020 35 | Lokomotiva | 1–1 | Gorica | Zagreb |
| 18:55 CEST (UTC+02:00) | Budimir 10' | Report | Lovrić (yellow card) 37'; Mudrinski (yellow card) 45+2' (goal) 61'; Muhammed (yellow card) 69'; Suk (yellow card) 72'; Hamad (yellow card) 82'; Steenvoorden (yellow card) 90+3' | Stadium: Stadion Kranjčevićeva; Attendance: 537; Referee: Mario Zebec |

| 24 July 2020 36 | Gorica | 0–0 | Slaven Belupo | Velika Gorica |
| 21:05 CEST (UTC+02:00) | Špikić (yellow card) 36'; Jovičić (yellow card) 48'; Moro (yellow card) 88' | Report | Goda (yellow card) 29' | Stadium: Stadion Radnik; Attendance: 0 Referee: Dario Bel |

Source: Croatian Football Federation

=== Croatian Football Cup ===
| 28 August 2019 PR | Gorica | 10–0 | Zagorec Krapina | Velika Gorica |
| 19:00 CEST (UTC+02:00) | Babec 20'; Tarle 28' (o.g.); Ndiaye 36'; Zwoliński 49' 53' 65'; Mathieu 58' 60' 81'; Lovrić 78' | Report | Smrekar (yellow card) 72' | Stadium: Stadion Radnik; Attendance: 504; Referee: Goran Pečarić |

| 25 September 2019 R1 | Gorica | 8–0 | Zagreb | Velika Gorica |
| 18:00 CEST (UTC+02:00) | Mathieu 6' 8'; Zwoliński 28' 42'; Ndiaye 62' (pen.) 73'; Maloča 79'; Dvorneković 89' | Report | Orešković (yellow card) 45'; Strunje (yellow card) 57' | Stadium: Stadion Radnik; Attendance: 250; Referee: Dario Kulušić |

| 30 October 2019 R2 | Gorica | 2–1 | Hajduk Split | Velika Gorica |
| 17:00 CEST (UTC+02:00) | Suk (yellow card) 58' (goal) 85'; Lovrić 64'; Čović (yellow card) 88'; Zwoliński (yellow card) 89' | Report | Caktaš (yellow card) 19'; Bradarić (yellow card) 63'; Posavec (yellow card) 65'; Ismajli (yellow card) 81'; Jairo (yellow card) 88'; Jurić 89' | Stadium: Stadion Radnik; Attendance: 3,011; Referee: Fran Jović |

| 4 December 2019 QF | Gorica | 1–2 | Slaven Belupo | Velika Gorica |
| 19:00 CEST (UTC+02:00) | Ndiaye (yellow card) 36' (goal) 53'; Lovrić (yellow card) 90+1' | Report | Mikulić 11'; Glavčić (yellow card) 14'; Božić (yellow card) 39'; Krstanović 75'; Bogojević (yellow card) 82'; Paracki (yellow card) 90+1' | Stadium: Stadion Radnik; Attendance: 700; Referee: Mario Zebec |

Source: Croatian Football Federation

== Player seasonal records ==
Updated 5 June 2021

=== Goals ===
| Rank | Name | League | Cup | Total |
|---|---|---|---|---|
| 1 | (Croatia) Kristijan Lovrić | 14 | 2 | 16 |
| 2 | (Senegal) Cherif Ndiaye | 7 | 4 | 11 |
| 3 | (Poland) Łukasz Zwoliński | 4 | 5 | 9 |
| 4 | (Netherlands) Joey Suk | 4 | 1 | 5 |
| 4 | (Netherlands) Justin Mathieu | – | 5 | 5 |
| 6 | (Serbia) Ognjen Mudrinski | 4 | – | 4 |
| 7 | (Iraq) Jiloan Hamad | 3 | – | 3 |
| 7 | (Croatia) Matija Dvorneković | 2 | 1 | 3 |
| 9 | (Poland) Michał Masłowski | 2 | – | 2 |
| 10 | (Croatia) Marijan Čabraja | 1 | – | 1 |
| 10 | (Bosnia and Herzegovina) Aleksandar Jovičić | 1 | – | 1 |
| 10 | (Uganda) Farouk Miya | 1 | – | 1 |
| 10 | (Netherlands) Matthew Steenvoorden | 1 | – | 1 |
| 10 | (Croatia) Hrvoje Babec | – | 1 | 1 |
| 10 | (Croatia) Martin Maloča | – | 1 | 1 |
| Own goals | | – | 1 | 1 |
| TOTALS | | 44 | 21 | 65 |

Source: Competitive matches

=== Clean sheets ===
| Rank | Name | League | Cup | Total |
|---|---|---|---|---|
| 1 | (Croatia) Kristijan Kahlina | 12 | 1 | 13 |
| 2 | (Croatia) Ivan Čović | – | 1 | 1 |
| TOTALS | | 12 | 2 | 14 |

Source: Competitive matches

=== Disciplinary record ===
| Number | Position | Player | 1. HNL | | | Croatian Cup | | | Total | | |
|---|---|---|---|---|---|---|---|---|---|---|---|
| Number | Position | Player | Yellow card | (yellow card) (yellow-red card) | Red card | Yellow card | (yellow card) (yellow-red card) | Red card | Yellow card | (yellow card) (yellow-red card) | Red card |
| 2 | DF | (Nigeria) Musa Muhammed | 9 | 1 | 0 | 0 | 0 | 0 | 9 | 1 | 0 |
| 3 | DF | (Bosnia and Herzegovina) Aleksandar Jovičić | 5 | 0 | 0 | 0 | 0 | 0 | 5 | 0 | 0 |
| 4 | DF | (Netherlands) Matthew Steenvoorden | 6 | 0 | 0 | 0 | 0 | 0 | 6 | 0 | 0 |
| 5 | DF | (Croatia) Maks Juraj Čelić | 3 | 0 | 0 | 0 | 0 | 0 | 3 | 0 | 0 |
| 6 | MF | (Poland) Michał Masłowski | 2 | 0 | 0 | 0 | 0 | 0 | 2 | 0 | 0 |
| 7 | MF | (Iraq) Jiloan Hamad | 1 | 0 | 0 | 0 | 0 | 0 | 1 | 0 | 0 |
| 8 | MF | (Netherlands) Joey Suk | 9 | 2 | 0 | 1 | 0 | 0 | 10 | 2 | 0 |
| 9 | FW | (Serbia) Ognjen Mudrinski | 1 | 0 | 0 | 0 | 0 | 0 | 1 | 0 | 0 |
| 9 | FW | (Poland) Łukasz Zwoliński | 3 | 0 | 0 | 1 | 0 | 0 | 4 | 0 | 0 |
| 10 | MF | (Croatia) Matija Dvorneković | 4 | 0 | 0 | 0 | 0 | 0 | 4 | 0 | 0 |
| 11 | MF | (Netherlands) Justin Mathieu | 2 | 0 | 0 | 0 | 0 | 0 | 2 | 0 | 0 |
| 11 | FW | (Croatia) Dario Špikić | 2 | 0 | 0 | 0 | 0 | 0 | 2 | 0 | 0 |
| 15 | DF | (Serbia) Nemanja Ljubisavljević | 0 | 1 | 0 | 0 | 0 | 0 | 0 | 1 | 0 |
| 18 | MF | (Croatia) Martin Šroler | 1 | 0 | 0 | 0 | 0 | 0 | 1 | 0 | 0 |
| 19 | DF | (Croatia) Marijan Čabraja | 7 | 0 | 1 | 0 | 0 | 0 | 7 | 0 | 1 |
| 20 | MF | (Croatia) Hrvoje Babec | 2 | 0 | 0 | 0 | 0 | 0 | 2 | 0 | 0 |
| 21 | MF | (Uganda) Farouk Miya | 1 | 0 | 0 | 0 | 0 | 0 | 1 | 0 | 0 |
| 23 | MF | (Australia) Anthony Kalik | 5 | 0 | 0 | 0 | 0 | 0 | 5 | 0 | 0 |
| 25 | DF | (Croatia) Krešimir Krizmanić | 2 | 0 | 0 | 0 | 0 | 0 | 2 | 0 | 0 |
| 30 | MF | (Croatia) Mario Marina | 6 | 1 | 0 | 0 | 0 | 0 | 6 | 1 | 0 |
| 32 | GK | (Croatia) Ivan Čović | 0 | 0 | 0 | 1 | 0 | 0 | 1 | 0 | 0 |
| 40 | DF | (Croatia) Patrik Periša | 1 | 0 | 0 | 0 | 0 | 0 | 1 | 0 | 0 |
| 44 | FW | (Croatia) Kristijan Lovrić | 13 | 1 | 0 | 1 | 0 | 0 | 14 | 1 | 0 |
| 45 | DF | (Ghana) Nasiru Moro | 1 | 0 | 0 | 0 | 0 | 0 | 1 | 0 | 0 |
| 77 | MF | (Croatia) Dario Čanađija | 7 | 0 | 0 | 0 | 0 | 0 | 7 | 0 | 0 |
| 99 | FW | (Senegal) Cherif Ndiaye | 3 | 2 | 0 | 1 | 0 | 0 | 4 | 2 | 0 |
| TOTALS | | | 96 | 8 | 1 | 5 | 0 | 0 | 101 | 8 | 1 |

=== Appearances and goals ===
| Number | Position | Player | Apps | Goals | Apps | Goals | Apps | Goals |
| Number | Position | Player | Total | | 1. HNL (Note: First number represents appearances in starting eleven, while the second number indicates a substitute appearance.) | | Croatian Cup | |
|---|---|---|---|---|---|---|---|---|
| 1 | GK | (Croatia) Kristijan Kahlina | 37 | 0 | 36+0 | 0 | 1+0 | 0 |
| 2 | DF | (Nigeria) Musa Muhammed | 34 | 0 | 31+0 | 0 | 3+0 | 0 |
| 3 | DF | (Bosnia and Herzegovina) Aleksandar Jovičić | 35 | 1 | 33+0 | 1 | 2+0 | 0 |
| 4 | DF | (Netherlands) Matthew Steenvoorden | 26 | 1 | 23+2 | 1 | 0+1 | 0 |
| 5 | DF | (Croatia) Maks Juraj Čelić | 9 | 0 | 7+1 | 0 | 1+0 | 0 |
| 6 | MF | (Poland) Michał Masłowski | 22 | 2 | 11+11 | 2 | 0+0 | 0 |
| 7 | MF | (Iraq) Jiloan Hamad | 29 | 3 | 19+6 | 3 | 2+2 | 0 |
| 8 | MF | (Netherlands) Joey Suk | 32 | 5 | 27+3 | 4 | 2+0 | 1 |
| 9 | FW | (Serbia) Ognjen Mudrinski | 12 | 4 | 3+9 | 4 | 0+0 | 0 |
| 9 | FW | (Poland) Łukasz Zwoliński | 21 | 9 | 10+7 | 4 | 2+2 | 5 |
| 10 | MF | (Croatia) Matija Dvorneković | 33 | 3 | 16+13 | 2 | 4+0 | 1 |
| 11 | MF | (Netherlands) Justin Mathieu | 18 | 5 | 6+10 | 0 | 2+0 | 5 |
| 11 | FW | (Croatia) Dario Špikić | 15 | 0 | 5+10 | 0 | 0+0 | 0 |
| 14 | MF | (Croatia) Martin Maloča | 5 | 1 | 1+2 | 0 | 2+0 | 1 |
| 15 | DF | (Serbia) Nemanja Ljubisavljević | 5 | 0 | 2+1 | 0 | 2+0 | 0 |
| 18 | MF | (Croatia) Martin Šroler | 5 | 0 | 0+5 | 0 | 0+0 | 0 |
| 19 | DF | (Croatia) Marijan Čabraja | 35 | 1 | 33+0 | 1 | 2+0 | 0 |
| 20 | MF | (Croatia) Hrvoje Babec | 28 | 1 | 17+8 | 0 | 2+1 | 1 |
| 21 | MF | (Lithuania) Paulius Golubickas | 5 | 0 | 3+2 | 0 | 0+0 | 0 |
| 21 | MF | (Uganda) Farouk Miya | 3 | 1 | 2+1 | 1 | 0+0 | 0 |
| 22 | MF | (Croatia) Gojko Gadže | 4 | 0 | 1+3 | 0 | 0+0 | 0 |
| 23 | MF | (Australia) Anthony Kalik | 9 | 0 | 6+3 | 0 | 0+0 | 0 |
| 25 | DF | (Croatia) Krešimir Krizmanić | 14 | 0 | 8+3 | 0 | 3+0 | 0 |
| 30 | MF | (Croatia) Mario Marina | 17 | 0 | 12+1 | 0 | 2+2 | 0 |
| 32 | GK | (Croatia) Ivan Čović | 3 | 0 | 0+0 | 0 | 3+0 | 0 |
| 33 | DF | (Croatia) Matija Špičić | 3 | 0 | 1+0 | 0 | 2+0 | 0 |
| 40 | DF | (Croatia) Patrik Periša | 6 | 0 | 2+3 | 0 | 0+1 | 0 |
| 44 | FW | (Croatia) Kristijan Lovrić | 34 | 16 | 31+0 | 14 | 2+1 | 2 |
| 45 | DF | (Ghana) Nasiru Moro | 3 | 0 | 3+0 | 0 | 0+0 | 0 |
| 77 | MF | (Croatia) Dario Čanađija | 25 | 0 | 17+5 | 0 | 3+0 | 0 |
| 99 | FW | (Senegal) Cherif Ndiaye | 36 | 11 | 30+3 | 7 | 2+1 | 4 |
