= Aleksandar Jovičić =

Bosnian footballer (born 1995)

Personal information
- Date of birth: 18 July 1995 (age 31)
- Place of birth: Banja Luka, Bosnia and Herzegovina
- Height: 1.89 m (6 ft 2 in)
- Position: Centre-back

Team information
- Current team: Kisvárda
- Number: 3

Youth career
- 2002–2013: Rudar Prijedor

Senior career*
Years	Team	Apps	(Gls)
2013–2014	Rudar Prijedor	12	(0)
2014–2015	Borac Banja Luka	0	(0)
2015	→ Krupa (loan)	11	(2)
2015–2016	Rudar Prijedor	25	(0)
2016–2018	Slaven Belupo	24	(1)
2018	→ Istra 1961 (loan)	10	(0)
2018–2022	Gorica	134	(5)
2022–	Kisvárda	83	(5)

International career
2015–2016	Bosnia and Herzegovina U21	7	(0)
2021	Bosnia and Herzegovina	2	(0)
- * Club domestic league appearances and goals as of 25 April 2026

Aleksandar Jovičić (pronounced [ǎleksandar jǒʋitʃitɕ]; born 18 July 1995) is a Bosnian professional footballer who plays as a centre-back for Nemzeti Bajnokság I club Kisvárda.

Jovičić started his professional career at Rudar Prijedor, before joining Borac Banja Luka in 2014, who loaned him to Krupa the following year. Later that year, he went back to Rudar Prijedor. In 2016, Jovičić moved to Slaven Belupo, who sent him on loan to Istra 1961 in 2018. Later that year, he signed with Gorica. In 2022, he moved to Kisvárda.

A former youth international for Bosnia and Herzegovina, Jovičić made his senior international debut in 2021, earning 2 caps.

== Club career ==
Jovičić came through Rudar Prijedor's youth setup, which he joined in 2002. He made his professional debut against Željezničar on 24 April 2013 at the age of 17.

In the summer of 2014, he switched to Borac Banja Luka. In February 2015, he was sent on a six-month loan to Krupa. On 11 April, he scored his first professional goal against Tekstilac.

In July, he returned to Rudar Prijedor.

In July 2016, Jovičić moved to Croatian side Slaven Belupo. In February 2018, he was loaned to Istra 1961 until the end of season.

In July, he signed with Gorica.

In November 2022, he moved to Hungarian outfit Kisvárda.

== International career ==
Jovičić was a member of the Bosnia and Herzegovina under-21 team under coach Darko Nestorović.

In May 2021, he received his first senior call up, for friendly games against Montenegro and Denmark. He debuted against the former on 2 June.

== Career statistics ==
=== Club ===
As of match played 25 April 2026

Appearances and goals by club, season and competition
Club	Season	League			National cup (Note: Includes Bosnian Cup, Croatian Cup, Magyar Kupa)		Other		Total	
Club	Season	Division	Apps	Goals	Apps	Goals	Apps	Goals	Apps	Goals
Rudar Prijedor	2012–13	Bosnian Premier League	4	0	–		–		4	0
Rudar Prijedor	2013–14	Bosnian Premier League	8	0	0	0	–		8	0
Rudar Prijedor	Total		12	0	0	0	–		12	0
Borac Banja Luka	2014–15	Bosnian Premier League	0	0	1	0	–		1	0
Krupa (loan)	2014–15	First League of the RS	11	2	–		–		11	2
Rudar Prijedor	2015–16	Bosnian Premier League	25	0	1	0	–		26	0
Slaven Belupo	2016–17	Croatian Football League	22	1	1	0	–		23	1
Slaven Belupo	2017–18	Croatian Football League	2	0	0	0	–		2	0
Slaven Belupo	Total		24	1	1	0	–		25	1
Istra 1961 (loan)	2017–18	Croatian Football League	10	0	–		1 (Note: Appearance in Croatian Football League relegation play-offs)	0	11	0
Gorica	2018–19	Croatian Football League	27	0	–		–		27	0
Gorica	2019–20	Croatian Football League	33	1	2	0	–		35	1
Gorica	2020–21	Croatian Football League	28	2	5	0	–		33	2
Gorica	2021–22	Croatian Football League	32	2	3	0	–		35	2
Gorica	2022–23	Croatian Football League	14	0	2	0	–		16	0
Gorica	Total		134	5	12	0	–		146	5
Kisvárda	2022–23	Nemzeti Bajnokság I	12	0	0	0	–		12	0
Kisvárda	2023–24	Nemzeti Bajnokság I	30	2	5	3	–		35	5
Kisvárda	2024–25	Nemzeti Bajnokság II	21	1	2	0	–		23	1
Kisvárda	2025–26	Nemzeti Bajnokság I	20	2	1	0	–		21	2
Kisvárda	Total		83	5	8	3	–		91	8
Career total			299	13	23	3	1	0	323	16

=== International ===
Appearances and goals by national team and year
National team	Year	Apps	Goals
Bosnia and Herzegovina
Bosnia and Herzegovina	2021	2	0
Total		2	0

== Honours ==
Kisvárda

- Nemzeti Bajnokság II: 2024–25
