= Kristijan Lovrić =

Croatian footballer

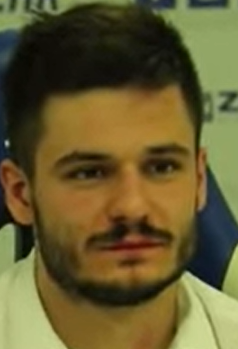

Personal information
- Date of birth: 1 December 1995 (age 30)
- Place of birth: Ogulin, Croatia
- Height: 1.86 m (6 ft 1 in)
- Position: Winger

Team information
- Current team: Rudeš

Youth career
- 2004–2007: Ogulin
- 2007–2008: Karlovac
- 2008–2012: Ogulin
- 2012–2013: Karlovac
- 2013: Ogulin

Senior career*
Years	Team	Apps	(Gls)
2013–2014	Bela Krajina	15	(19)
2014–2015	Ogulin	13	(7)
2015–2017	Kustošija	53	(28)
2017–2018	Lokomotiva	1	(0)
2017	→ Lučko (loan)	9	(2)
2018	→ Kustošija (loan)	11	(11)
2018–2022	HNK Gorica	120	(54)
2022–2024	Osijek	55	(9)
2024–2025	Amedspor	11	(2)
2025–	Rudeš	0	(0)

International career^{‡}
2021–	Croatia	1	(0)
- * Club domestic league appearances and goals as of 7 March 2025 ‡ National team caps and goals as of 30 March 2021

Kristijan Lovrić (born 1 December 1995) is a Croatian professional footballer who plays as a winger for Rudeš.

== International career ==
After three great seasons for Gorica in the Prva HNL, Croatia manager Zlatko Dalić activated a standby call-up for Lovrić due to the unavailability of Ante Rebić, for matches against Slovenia, Cyprus and Malta in the 2022 World Cup qualifiers. He made his debut on 30 March 2021 against Malta. On 17 May 2021, Lovrić was named in the preliminary 34-man squad for the UEFA Euro 2020, but did not make the final 26.

== Personal life ==
He is married to Croatian footballer Monika Conjar.

His father is from Bosnia and Herzegovina, so he is eligible for the Bosnia and Herzegovina national football team.

== Career statistics ==
=== Club ===
As of 30 October 2021

Appearances and goals by club, season and competition
Club	Season	League			Cup		Total	
Club	Season	Division	Apps	Goals	Apps	Goals	Apps	Goals
Bela Krajina	2013–14	2. SNL	5	0	0	0	5	0
Lokomotiva	2016–17	Prva HNL	1	0	0	0	0	0
Lučko (loan)	2016–17	Druga HNL	9	2	0	0	0	0
Kustošija (loan)	2017–18	Druga HNL	11	11	1	1	12	12
Gorica	2018–19	Prva HNL	30	10	0	0	30	10
Gorica	2019–20	Prva HNL	31	14	3	2	34	16
Gorica	2020–21	Prva HNL	29	15	3	3	32	18
Gorica	2021–22	Prva HNL	13	5	1	2	14	7
Gorica	Total		103	44	7	7	110	51
Career total			129	57	8	8	137	65

=== International ===
As of match played 30 March 2021

Appearances and goals by national team and year
National team	Year	Apps	Goals
Croatia	2021	1	0
Total		1	0
