= Damir Žutić =

Croatian footballer

Personal information
- Date of birth: 22 July 1993 (age 33)
- Place of birth: Croatia
- Position: Leftback

Senior career*
Years	Team	Apps	(Gls)
-2019	Gorica	142	(5)
2019	Atlantas	24	(0)
2021	Rudeš	3	(0)
- * Club domestic league appearances and goals

Damir Žutić (Lithuanian: Damiras Žutičius; born 22 July 1993 in Croatia) is a Croatian footballer who most recently played for NK Rudeš.

== Career ==
Žutić started his senior career with HNK Gorica, where he made five appearances and scored zero goals in the Croatian First Football League. After that, he moved abroad to play for Lithuanian side Atlantas Klaipeda in 2019. He left Atlantas in January 2020.
