= Héber (footballer) =

Brazilian footballer (born 1991)

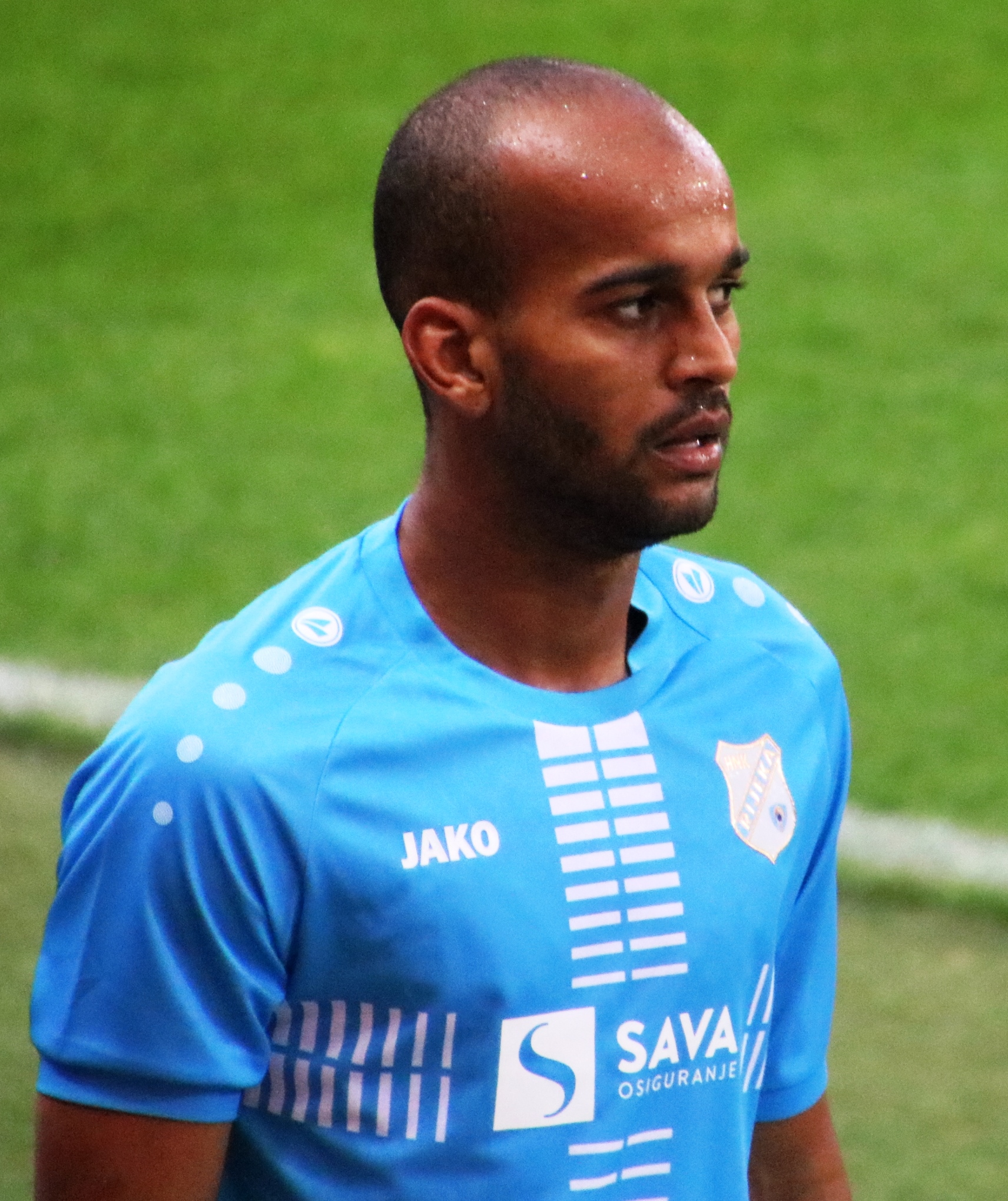
- Héber with Rijeka in 2017

Personal information
- Full name: Héber Araujo dos Santos
- Date of birth: 10 August 1991 (age 35)
- Place of birth: Colorado do Oeste, Brazil
- Height: 1.80 m (5 ft 11 in)
- Position: Forward

Team information
- Current team: América Mineiro
- Number: 11

Youth career
- –2010: Figueirense

Senior career*
Years	Team	Apps	(Gls)
2010–2011	Figueirense	61	(17)
2011–2016	Coimbra	0	(0)
2013	→ CRAC (loan)	13	(7)
2014	→ Avaí (loan)	24	(4)
2015	→ Paysandu (loan)	3	(0)
2015–2016	→ Alashkert (loan)	26	(16)
2016–2017	Slaven Belupo	30	(10)
2017–2019	Rijeka	38	(25)
2019–2022	New York City	70	(24)
2023	Seattle Sounders FC	22	(2)
2024	Cangzhou Mighty Lions	24	(8)
2025	Al Orooba	9	(3)
2025–	América Mineiro	5	(0)
- * Club domestic league appearances and goals as of 17 December 2025

Héber Araujo dos Santos (born 10 August 1991), commonly known as Héber, is a Brazilian professional footballer who plays as a forward for América Mineiro.

== Club career ==
In June 2016, Héber switched teams within the Croatian league, joining Rijeka from Slaven Belupo for a transfer fee of €450,000. He signed a three-year contract with the club with an option for a two-year extension.

On 21 March 2019, Héber joined Major League Soccer side New York City FC. He was the team's leading scorer for the 2019 season with 15 goals. In a match against Toronto FC, Héber tore his ACL, ending his 2020 season.

He was traded to Seattle Sounders FC on 29 December 2022 in exchange for $400,000 in General Allocation Money, with potential for a further $150,000 should certain conditions be met. Héber made his debut for the club in the 2022 FIFA Club World Cup and later scored in his first MLS match on 26 February against the Colorado Rapids. He was released from the team at the end of the season.

On 29 February 2024, Héber joined Chinese Super League club Cangzhou Mighty Lions.

== Career statistics ==
=== Club ===
As of matches played 12 October 2025

Appearances and goals by club, season and competition
Club	Season	League			State League		National Cup		Continental		Other		Total	
Club	Season	Division	Apps	Goals	Apps	Goals	Apps	Goals	Apps	Goals	Apps	Goals	Apps	Goals
Figueirense	2010	Serie B	8	3	0	0	0	0	—		—		8	3
Figueirense	2011	Serie A	16	3	19 (Note: Appearance(s) in Campeonato Catarinense)	10	0	0	—		—		35	13
Figueirense	2012	Serie A	4	0	6	1	0	0	—		—		10	1
Figueirense	2013	Serie B	—		8	0	0	0	—		—		8	0
Figueirense	Total		28	6	33	11	0	0	—		—		61	17
CRAC (loan)	2013	Serie C	13	7	—		1	0	—		—		14	7
Avaí (loan)	2014	Serie B	14	0	10	4	2	1	—		—		26	5
Paysandu (loan)	2014	Serie C	—		3 (Note: Appearance(s) in Campeonato Paraense)	0	0	0	—		1 (Note: Appearance(s) in Copa Verde)	0	4	0
Alashkert (loan)	2015–16	Armenian Premier League	26	16	—		4	3	4 (Note: Appearance(s) in UEFA Europa League)	1	—		34	20
Slaven Belupo	2016–17	Prva HNL	30	10	—		2	0	—		—		32	10
Rijeka	2017–18	Prva HNL	23	16	—		1	0	9 (Note: Six appearances and one goal in UEFA Champions League and three appearances in UEFA Europa League)	1	—		33	17
Rijeka	2018–19	Prva HNL	15	9	—		2	1	2	0	—		19	10
Rijeka	Total		38	25	—		3	1	11	1	—		52	27
New York City FC	2019	MLS	22	15	—		3	0	—		1 (Note: Appearance(s) in MLS Cup Playoffs)	0	26	15
New York City FC	2020	MLS	12	1	—		—		2 (Note: Appearance(s) in CONCACAF Champions League)	3	—		14	1
New York City FC	2021	MLS	7	0	—		—		5	0	1	0	13	1
New York City FC	2022	MLS	29	8	—		2	1	—		3	2	34	11
New York City FC	Total		70	24	—		5	1	7	3	5	2	87	28
Seattle Sounders FC	2023	MLS	22	2	—		—		—		3 (Note: 1 appearance in FIFA Club World Cup, 2 appearances in Leagues Cup)	0	25	2
Cangzhou Mighty Lions	2024	Chinese Super League	24	8	—		0	0	—		—		24	8
Al Orooba	2024–25	UAE Pro League	9	3	—		—		—		—		9	3
América Mineiro (loan)	2025	Serie B	5	0	—		—		—		—		5	0
Career total			279	101	46	15	17	6	22	5	9	2	373	129

== Honours ==
Alashkert

- Armenian Premier League: 2015–16

New York City FC

- MLS Cup: 2021
- Campeones Cup: 2022

Individual

- Armenian Premier League Top Scorer: 2015–16
- SN Yellow Shirt Award: 2017–18
