= Ahmed Ramzy Yussif =

Ghanaian footballer

Ramzy Yussif
Personal information
- Full name: Ahmed Ramzy Yussif
- Date of birth: 6 July 2000 (age 26)
- Place of birth: Techiman, Ghana
- Height: 1.73 m (5 ft 8 in)
- Position: Attacking midfielder

Team information
- Current team: Hearts of Oak

Youth career
- –2018: Accra Lions

Senior career*
Years	Team	Apps	(Gls)
2018–2020	Accra Lions		
2018–2019	→ HNK Gorica (loan)	0	(0)
2021	Energetik-BGU Minsk	9	(0)
2021–2024	New Edubiase United		
2024–	Hearts of Oak		
- * Club domestic league appearances and goals as of 31 July 2021

Ramzy Yussif (born 6 July 2000) is a professional Ghanaian footballer who plays as a midfielder for Hearts of Oak.

== Club career ==
=== HNK Gorica ===
Yussif signed for HNK Gorica on 31 August 2018.
