= Guti (Brazilian footballer) =

Brazilian footballer (born 1991)

Personal information
- Full name: Gutieri Tomelin
- Date of birth: 29 June 1991 (age 35)
- Place of birth: São Bento do Sul, Brazil
- Height: 1.87 m (6 ft 2 in)
- Position: Centre-back

Team information
- Current team: Sport Huancayo
- Number: 4

Youth career
- –2011: Figueirense

Senior career*
Years	Team	Apps	(Gls)
2011–2014	Figueirense	16	(0)
2014	→ Duque de Caxias (loan)	0	(0)
2014–2016	Joinville	51	(1)
2016–2018	Jagiellonia Białystok	63	(1)
2018–2021	Osijek	56	(1)
2021–2023	Hapoel Nof HaGalil	48	(2)
2023	Telavi	17	(1)
2024–	Sport Huancayo	6	(0)
- * Club domestic league appearances and goals as of 30 June 2024

Gutieri Tomelin (born 29 June 1991) is a Brazilian professional footballer who plays as a centre-back for Peruvian Primera División club Sport Huancayo.

== Honours ==
Joinville

- Brazilian Série B: 2014
