= Mario Marina =

Croatian footballer

Personal information
- Date of birth: 3 August 1989 (age 37)
- Place of birth: Bugojno, SFR Yugoslavia
- Height: 1.84 m (6 ft 1/2 in)
- Position: Midfielder

Team information
- Current team: Varaždin
- Number: 24

Youth career
- –2006: Dinara Knin
- 2006–2007: Lokomotiva Zagreb

Senior career*
Years	Team	Apps	(Gls)
2008	Dinara Knin		
2009	Zagora Unešić		
2009	Dinara Knin		
2010–2011	Imotski	33	(0)
2012	Krka Lozovac	8	(6)
2012–2016	Šibenik	42	(5)
2016	Gorica	27	(1)
2017	Široki Brijeg	10	(0)
2017–2019	Gorica	73	(3)
2020–2021	Sabah	29	(2)
2021–2023	Slaven Belupo	58	(3)
2023–	Varaždin	79	(1)
- * Club domestic league appearances and goals as of 15 June 2026

Mario Marina (born 3 August 1989) is a Croatian football midfielder who plays for Varaždin in the 1. HNL.

== Club career ==
On 29 December 2019, Marina signed 1.5 years contract with Azerbaijan Premier League side Sabah.

== Honours ==
=== Club ===
Široki Brijeg

- Bosnia and Herzegovina Football Cup (1): 2016–17

Gorica

- Croatian Second Football League (1): 2017–18
