= Andrej Šimunec =

Croatian footballer

Personal information
- Full name: Andrej Šimunec
- Date of birth: March 2, 1995 (age 31)
- Place of birth: Osijek, Croatia
- Height: 1.92 m (6 ft 4 in)
- Position: Defender

Senior career*
Years	Team	Apps	(Gls)
2013–2019	Osijek	25	(1)
2015–2016	→ Višnjevac (loan)		
2018–2019	→ Inter Zaprešić (loan)	25	(2)
2020	Aves	2	(0)

International career
2013–2014	Croatia U19	4	(0)
- * Club domestic league appearances and goals as of 10 September 2019

Andrej Šimunec (born 2 March 1995) is a Croatian professional footballer who most recently played as a defender for Aves of the Portuguese Primeira Liga.

== Career ==
Šimunec made his professional debut with his hometown club Osijek in a 1-0 Croatian First Football League win over HNK Rijeka on 6 April 2019. On 6 August 2019, signed with Aves for 3 seasons.
