= Igor Čagalj =

Croatian footballer (born 1982)

Personal information
- Date of birth: 8 October 1982 (age 44)
- Place of birth: Doboj, SFR Yugoslavia
- Height: 1.75 m (5 ft 9 in)
- Position: Defender

Youth career
- Dinamo Zagreb

Senior career*
Years	Team	Apps	(Gls)
2001–2002	Segesta	15	(0)
2002–2005	Hrvatski Dragovoljac	58	(3)
2005–2006	Inter Zaprešić	20	(0)
2006–2007	Šibenik	25	(0)
2007–2012	Rijeka	112	(1)
2012–2014	Istra 1961	43	(0)
2014–2017	Hrvatski Dragovoljac	75	(2)
2017–2019	Gorica	57	(0)
2019	Vinogradar	13	(0)
2020–2021	Ravnice	34	(0)
2021–2022	Rugvica Sava	26	(0)

International career
1998	Croatia U15	5	(0)
1998–2000	Croatia U17	6	(0)
- * Club domestic league appearances and goals

Igor Čagalj (born 8 October 1982) is a retired Croatian footballer who played as a defender.

== Career statistics ==
Appearances and goals by club, season and competition
Club performance			League		National cup		Continental		Total	
Season	Club	League	Apps	Goals	Apps	Goals	Apps	Goals	Apps	Goals
Croatia			League		Croatian Cup		Europe		Total	
2001–02	Segesta	Druga HNL – South	15	0	—		—		15	0
2002–03	Hrvatski Dragovoljac	Druga HNL – South	11	0	—		—		11	0
2003–04	Hrvatski Dragovoljac	Druga HNL – South	19	0	—		—		19	0
2004–05	Hrvatski Dragovoljac	Druga HNL – South	28	3	1	0	—		29	3
2005–06	Inter Zaprešić	Prva HNL	20	0	—		—		20	0
2006–07	Šibenik	Prva HNL	25	0	2	0	—		20	0
2007–08	Rijeka	Prva HNL	18	0	2	0	—		20	0
2008–09	Rijeka	Prva HNL	19	1	3	0	1	0	23	1
2009–10	Rijeka	Prva HNL	26	0	2	0	4	0	32	0
2010–11	Rijeka	Prva HNL	24	0	4	0	—		28	0
2011–12	Rijeka	Prva HNL	25	0	4	0	—		29	0
2012–13	Istra 1961	Prva HNL	20	0	2	0	—		22	0
2013–14	Istra 1961	Prva HNL	23	0	3	0	—		26	0
2014–15	Hrvatski Dragovoljac	Druga HNL	27	2	—		—		27	2
2015–16	Hrvatski Dragovoljac	Druga HNL	25	0	—		—		25	0
2016–17	Hrvatski Dragovoljac	Druga HNL	23	0	—		—		23	0
2017–18	Gorica	Druga HNL	29	0	—		—		29	0
2018–19	Gorica	Prva HNL	28	0	—		—		28	0
Total
Total	Hrvatski Dragovoljac total		133	5	1	0	0	0	134	5
Total	Rijeka total		112	1	15	0	5	0	132	1
Total	Istra 1961 total		43	0	5	0	0	0	48	0
Total	Gorica total		57	0	0	0	0	0	57	0
Total	Career total		405	6	23	0	5	0	433	6

== Honours ==
Gorica

- Druga HNL: 2017–18
