= Matija Dvorneković =

Croatian footballer

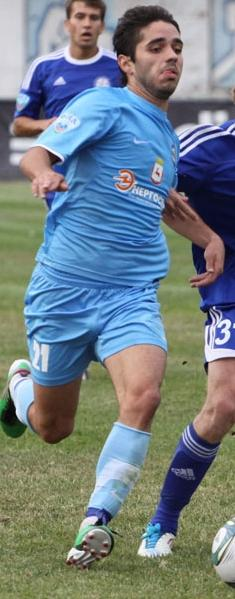

Personal information
- Date of birth: 1 January 1989 (age 37)
- Place of birth: Zagreb, SR Croatia, SFR Yugoslavia
- Height: 1.67 m (5 ft 5 1/2 in)
- Position: Winger

Youth career
- 1998–2006: Radnik Velika Gorica
- 2006–2008: Slaven Belupo

Senior career*
Years	Team	Apps	(Gls)
2008-2009	Slaven Belupo	0	(0)
2008–2009	→ Koprivnica (loan)	21	(5)
2009	→ Križevci (loan)	13	(1)
2010–2011	Gorica	32	(9)
2011–2012	Nizhny Novgorod	39	(6)
2012–2013	Volga Nizhny Novgorod	13	(1)
2013–2014	Torpedo Moscow	5	(1)
2014–2016	Gorica	40	(14)
2016–2017	Kukësi	50	(8)
2017	FH	8	(1)
2017–2022	Gorica	123	(7)

International career
2008	Croatia U19	2	(0)
- * Club domestic league appearances and goals

Matija Dvorneković (born 1 January 1989) is a Croatian retired footballer.

== Club career ==
=== Early career ===
Growing up in Velika Gorica, Dvorneković went through the ranks of the local Radnik, before joining NK Slaven Belupo's top tier U19 team in 2007. His appearances for their youth team landed him a contract in March 2008. Graduating from the academy, Dvorneković was sent on loans to third-tier teams, first for a season to Slaven's feeder club NK Koprivnica and then to NK Križevci for the start of the 2009/2010 season. At the start of 2010, the club agreed to terminate his contract so that he could move to the newly founded HNK Gorica back in his hometown. With Gorica, Dvorneković achieved promotion to the Druga HNL and was a fixture in a team that would win the second-tier competition the following season, but, before its end, he made his first international transfer, to FC Nizhny Novgorod.

=== Nizhny Novgorod ===
He made his debut in the Russian First Division for FC Nizhny Novgorod on 25 April 2011 in a game against FC Luch-Energiya Vladivostok.

=== Gorica ===
On 7 August 2014, Dvorneković signed with Gorica as a free agent.

=== Kukësi ===
On 6 January 2016, Dvorneković completed a transfer to Albanian Superliga side Kukësi by joining as a free agent. He made his debut later on 23 January, starting in team's 0–1 away defeat to Teuta Durrës for the first leg of the Albanian Cup quarter-final. On his league debut eight days later, he came off the bench and scored the third goal as Kukësi won 3–0 against Bylis Ballsh at home. During the 2016–17 season, Dvorneković contributed with 4 league goals in 33 appearances as Kukësi won its maiden Albanian Superliga title. Following the end of the season, on 10 June 2017, Kukësi decided not to continue its cooperation with the player as his wage was high, leaving him a free agent in the process.

=== FH ===
On the 1st of August 2017, Dvorneković joined the Icelandic Champions Fimleikafélag Hafnarfjarðar He played 8 games for the club.

== International career ==
A former youth international for Croatia, Dvorneković has made 2 competitive appearances for under-19 side.

== Honours ==
Kukësi

- Albanian Superliga: 2016–17
- Albanian Cup: 2015–16
- Albanian Supercup: 2016
