= Martin Maloča =

Croatian footballer

Personal information
- Full name: Martin Maloča
- Date of birth: 21 March 1990 (age 36)
- Place of birth: Zagreb, Croatia
- Position: Midfielder

Team information
- Current team: Lučko
- Number: 8

Youth career
- 2001–2005: NK Zagreb
- 2005–2009: Dubrava

Senior career*
Years	Team	Apps	(Gls)
2005–2013	Dubrava		
2013–2016	Sesvete	92	(3)
2017	Al-Faisaly	11	(0)
2017–2018	Sesvete	24	(3)
2018–2020	Gorica	30	(0)
2020-2021	Gaj		
2021–2022	Ravnice		
2022-	Lučko		
- * Club domestic league appearances and goals as of 28 July 2018

Martin Maloča (born 21 March 1990) is a Croatian footballer who plays for NK Lučko.
