= 2024–25 HNK Gorica season =

HNK Gorica
2024–25 season
- Chairman: Nenad Črnko
- Manager: Rajko Vidović (until 8 October 2024); Mario Carević (since 15 October 2024)
- Stadium: Stadion Radnik
- HNL: 8th
- Croatian Cup: Quarter-finals
- Top goalscorer: League: Marko Kolar (4); All: Marko Kolar (4)

The 2024–25 HNK Gorica season is the club's 16th season in existence and the 7th consecutive season in the top flight of Croatian football.

== Current squad ==
As of 18 April 2025

Note: Flags indicate national team as defined under FIFA eligibility rules; some limited exceptions apply. Players may hold more than one non-FIFA nationality.

No.	Pos.	Nation	Player
1	GK	CRO	Karlo Žiger
2	DF	CRO	Dino Mikanović
4	DF	NED	Matthew Steenvoorden
5	DF	CRO	Mateo Leš
6	DF	CRO	Jakov Gurlica
7	MF	ALB	Adrion Pajaziti (on loan from Fulham)
8	MF	CGO	Merveil Ndockyt
9	FW	BIH	Filip Čuić
10	MF	CRO	Jurica Pršir (Captain)
11	FW	CRO	Martin Šlogar
14	MF	MKD	Agon Elezi (on loan from Bochum)
18	MF	CRO	Ivan Fiolić
20	MF	CRO	Luka Vrzić
21	FW	CRO	Marko Kolar
23	MF	CRO	Luka Kapulica
24	DF	CRO	Mateo Bašić

No.	Pos.	Nation	Player
25	DF	CRO	Krešimir Krizmanić
27	DF	SLO	Gregor Sikošek (on loan from Maribor)
28	DF	CRO	Slavko Bralić (on loan from Celje)
29	MF	SRB	Nikola Jojić (on loan from Stoke City)
30	GK	CRO	Darijan Žarkov
31	GK	CRO	Ivan Banić (2nd Captain)
32	MF	CRO	Tibor Halilović
34	DF	CRO	Mario Matković
47	DF	CRO	Anton Krešić (on loan from Cluj)
50	FW	CRO	Ante Erceg
55	MF	CRO	Vito Čaić (on loan from Dinamo Zagreb)
77	MF	CRO	Valentino Majstorović
87	MF	CRO	Antonio Ilić
88	MF	SEN	Sekou Matar Sagna
90	DF	CRO	Dino Štiglec
99	FW	KOS	Medin Gashi

== Transfers ==
=== In ===
Pos	Player	Transferred from	Fee	Date	Source
DF	(France) Nathan Cruce-Corcy	(Croatia) Mladost Ždralovi	Back from loan	30 May 2024	
GK	(Croatia) Karlo Žiger	(Croatia) Sesvete	Back from loan	30 June 2024	
MF	(Croatia) Patrik Jug	(Slovenia) Beltinci	Back from loan	30 June 2024	
MF	(Croatia) Vinko Skrbin	(Slovenia) Tolmin	Back from loan	30 June 2024	
FW	(Brazil) Caio Da Cruz	(Slovenia) Radomlje	Back from loan	30 June 2024	
FW	(Croatia) Martin Šlogar	(Cyprus) AEZ Zakakiou	Free	11 July 2024	
FW	(Croatia) Marko Kolar	(Slovenia) Maribor	Free	19 July 2024	
DF	(Croatia) Dino Mikanović	(Croatia) Hajduk Split	Free	27 July 2024	
DF	(Croatia) Ante Sušak	(Croatia) Dinamo Zagreb	Loan	30 July 2024	
MF	(Croatia) Vito Čaić	(Croatia) Dinamo Zagreb	Loan	30 July 2024	
FW	(Croatia) Toni Majić	(Croatia) Dinamo Zagreb	Loan	30 July 2024	
MF	(Serbia) Damjan Pavlović	(Croatia) Rijeka	Free	1 August 2024	
DF	(Croatia) Jakov Gurlica	(Croatia) Dinamo Zagreb	Free	2 August 2024	
FW	(Kosovo) Medin Gashi	(Kosovo) Vushtrria	Undisclosed	11 August 2024	
DF	(Croatia) David Sim	(Slovenia) Rogaška	Free	22 August 2024	
MF	(Albania) Adrion Pajaziti	(England) Fulham	Loan	5 September 2024	
FW	(Portugal) Mesaque Djú	No team	Free	5 September 2024	
MF	(Germany) Meritan Shabani	No team	Free	15 September 2024	
DF	(Netherlands) Matthew Steenvoorden	(Malaysia) Terengganu	Free	15 October 2024	
MF	(Croatia) Tibor Halilović	No team	Free	7 November 2024	
DF	(Croatia) Slavko Bralić	(Slovenia) Celje	Loan	30 December 2024	
FW	(Croatia) Ante Erceg	(Netherlands) Fortuna Sittard	Free	2 January 2025	
FW	(Bosnia and Herzegovina) Filip Čuić	(Croatia) Lokomotiva Zagreb	Free	8 January 2025	
DF	(Slovenia) Gregor Sikošek	(Slovenia) Maribor	Loan	10 January 2025	
MF	(North Macedonia) Agon Elezi	(Germany) Bochum	Loan	10 January 2025	
MF	(Croatia) Ivan Fiolić	No team	Free	15 January 2025	
MF	(Croatia) Antonio Ilić	(Austria) Sturm Graz II	Undisclosed	21 January 2025	
GK	(Croatia) Darijan Žarkov	No team	Free	28 January 2025	
DF	(Croatia) Mateo Bašić	(Croatia) Dugopolje	Free	28 January 2025	
MF	(Croatia) Patrik Jug	Croatia Zmijavci	Recalled from loan	12 February 2025	
FW	(Croatia) Lovro Nezirović	(Croatia) Karlovac 1919	Recalled from loan	12 February 2025	
MF	(Croatia) Luka Brlek	(Croatia) Karlovac 1919	Recalled from loan	14 February 2025	
MF	(Serbia) Nikola Jojić	(England) Stoke City	Loan	17 February 2025	
DF	(Croatia) Anton Krešić	(Romania) CFR Cluj	Loan	17 February 2025	

Source: Glasilo Hrvatskog nogometnog saveza

=== Out ===
Pos	Player	Transferred to	Fee	Date	Source
MF	(Croatia) Marko Soldo	(Croatia) Dinamo Zagreb	Back from loan	28 May 2024	
FW	(Croatia) Gabrijel Rukavina	(Croatia) Dinamo Zagreb	Back from loan	28 May 2024	
DF	(Denmark) Alexander Munksgaard	(Czech Republic) Baník Ostrava	Free	30 May 2024	
MF	(Netherlands) Sven Blummel	(Netherlands) Eindhoven	Free	30 May 2024	
MF	(Croatia) Lenny Ilečić	No team	Free	18 June 2024	
FW	(Slovenia) Tim Matavž	(Slovenia) Gorica	Free	18 June 2024	
GK	(Croatia) Jan Paolo Debijađi	(Croatia) HAŠK	Free	2 July 2024	
MF	(Croatia) Josip Mitrović	(Netherlands) Fortuna Sittard	500,000 €	5 July 2024	
MF	(Croatia) Filip Mrzljak	(India) Punjab	Free	9 July 2024	
FW	(Montenegro) Nikola Vujnović	(Azerbaijan) Sumgayit	Undisclosed	13 July 2024	
DF	(Croatia) Ino Vuko	(Croatia) Karlovac 1919	Loan	25 July 2024	
MF	(Croatia) Luka Brlek	(Croatia) Karlovac 1919	Loan	25 July 2024	
FW	(Croatia) Lovro Nezirović	(Croatia) Karlovac 1919	Loan	25 July 2024	
FW	(Croatia) Ante Matej Jurić	(Italy) Brescia	400,000 €	6 August 2024	
DF	(France) Nathan Cruce-Corcy	(Montenegro) Sutjeska Nikšić	Free	8 August 2024	
MF	(Croatia) Patrik Jug	Croatia Zmijavci	Loan	13 August 2024	
DF	(Croatia) David Sim	(Croatia) Marsonia 1909	Loan	23 August 2024	
MF	(North Macedonia) Andrej Lazarov	(North Macedonia) Shkupi	Free	29 August 2024	
FW	(Brazil) Caio Da Cruz	(Croatia) Sesvete	Loan	2 September 2023	
DF	(Croatia) Ante Sušak	(Croatia) Dinamo Zagreb	Recalled from loan	6 January 2025	
FW	(Croatia) Toni Majić	(Croatia) Dinamo Zagreb	Recalled from loan	6 January 2025	
MF	(Serbia) Damjan Pavlović	(Lithuania) Kauno Žalgiris	Free	24 January 2025	
MF	(Germany) Meritan Shabani	No team	Free	3 February 2025	
FW	(Portugal) Mesaque Djú	(Portugal) Oliveirense	Free	3 February 2025	
DF	(Serbia) Đuro Giulio Đekić	(Serbia) OFK Vršac	Free	7 February 2025	
MF	(Croatia) Vinko Skrbin	(Slovenia) Gorica	Loan	13 February 2025	
FW	(Croatia) Lovro Nezirović	(Croatia) Dugo Selo	Loan	13 February 2025	
MF	(Croatia) Patrik Jug	(Croatia) Jarun	Loan	14 February 2025	
GK	(Croatia) Matej Vidić	(Croatia) Segesta	Loan	17 February 2025	
MF	(Croatia) Luka Brlek	(Slovenia) Brežice 1919	Loan	17 February 2025	
GK	(Croatia) Božidar Radošević	No team	Free	17 April 2025	
DF	(Croatia) Mario Maloča	No team	Free	17 April 2025	

Source: Glasilo Hrvatskog nogometnog saveza

Total spending: ▼0 €

Total income: ▲900,000 €

Total expenditure: ▲900,000 €

== Competitions ==
=== Overview ===
Competition	First match	Last match	Starting round	Record							
Competition	First match	Last match	Starting round	Pld	W	D	L	GF	GA	GD	Win %
SuperSport HNL	3 August 2024	TBC	Matchday 1	23	6	5	12	20	33	−13	26.09
Croatian Cup	11 September 2024		First round	2	0	2	0	2	2	+0	0.00
Total				25	6	7	12	22	35	−13	24.00

Last updated: 25 February 2025
Source: Soccerway

=== Croatian Football League ===
==== League table ====
Pos	Team	Pld	W	D	L	GF	GA	GD	Pts	Qualification or relegation (Note: The 2024–25 Croatian Football Cup winners qualify for the Europa League first qualifying round (or the second-placed team if the Croatian Cup winners finish first). If the Croatian Cup winners finish in the top three, the second Conference League second qualifying round spot will be passed to the fourth-placed team.)
6	Istra 1961	36	11	15	10	39	42	−3	48	
7	Osijek	36	11	9	16	46	52	−6	42	
8	Lokomotiva	36	10	9	17	45	54	−9	39	
9	Gorica	36	9	10	17	29	51	−22	37	
10	Šibenik (R)	36	7	9	20	28	60	−32	30	Relegation to First Football League

Source: SuperSport HNL
Rules for classification: 1) Points; 2) Head-to-head points; 3) Head-to-head goal difference; 4) Head-to-head goals scored (at home if two teams tied); 5) Goal difference; 6) Goals scored; 7) Play-off
(Note: Criteria 2-4 and 7 is only used if deciding champion, teams to international competition or teams for relegation and in that case criteria 6 will not be used).
(R) Relegated

==== Results summary ====
Overall								Home						Away					
Pld	W	D	L	GF	GA	GD	Pts	W	D	L	GF	GA	GD	W	D	L	GF	GA	GD
23	6	5	12	20	33	−13	23	6	4	2	14	12	+2	0	1	10	6	21	−15

Last updated: 25 February 2025.
Source: SuperSport HNL

==== Results by round ====
Round	1	2	3	4	5	6	7	8	9	10	11	12	13	14	15	16	17	18	19	20	21	22	23	24
Ground	H	A	H	A	H	H	A	H	A	A	H	A	H	A	A	H	A	H	H	A	H	A	H	
Result	D	L	D	L	W	L	L	W	L	L	W	L	D	L	L	W	L	L	D	D	W	L	W	
Position	5	7	6	7	7	7	8	7	8	9	8	8	8	10	10	8	10	10	10	10	9	9	9	

Updated to match(es) played on 23 February 2025. Source: SuperSport HNL
A = Away; H = Home; W = Win; D = Draw; L = Loss

==== Matches ====
3 August 2024 1	Gorica	0–0	Varaždin	Velika Gorica
21:00 CEST (UTC+02:00)	Kapulica (yellow card) 44'; Pršir (yellow card) 62'	Report	Mitrovski (yellow card) 87'	Stadium: Stadion Radnik; Attendance: 660; Referee: Ante Čulina

10 August 2024 2	Istra 1961	2–1	Gorica	Pula
21:00 CEST (UTC+02:00)	Kadušić (yellow card) 38'; Marešić 71' (pen.) (yellow card) 90+5'; Iovu (yellow card) 83'; Petrusenko 89'	Report	Štiglec (yellow card) 44'; Čaić (yellow card) 77'; Kolar 84'	Stadium: Stadion Aldo Drosina; Attendance: 2,069; Referee: Ante Terzić

18 August 2024 3	Gorica	2–2	Osijek	Velika Gorica
21:00 CEST (UTC+02:00)	Kapulica 38'; Čaić (yellow card) 62'; Pavlović 82'	Report	Jugović 53', 61'; Matković (yellow card) 59'	Stadium: Stadion Radnik; Attendance: 1,077; Referee: Mario Zebec

24 August 2024 4	Dinamo Zagreb	2–1	Gorica	Zagreb
20:30 CEST (UTC+02:00)	Kulenović 6', 57'; Mmaee (yellow card) 64'	Report	Leš (yellow card) 72'; Sagna (yellow card) 78'; Pršir 90+1'	Stadium: Stadion Maksimir; Attendance: 9,644; Referee: Ante Terzić

30 August 2024 5	Gorica	2–1	Šibenik	Velika Gorica
20:00 CEST (UTC+02:00)	Maloča (yellow card) 33'; Ndockyt 42' (yellow card) 90+6'; Šlogar (yellow card) 50'; Kolar (yellow card) 73'; Mikanović 76'	Report	Bakić (yellow card) 73'; Vasilj 90+6'	Stadium: Stadion Radnik; Attendance: 1,168; Referee: Toni Dadić

14 September 2024 6	Gorica	0–1	Rijeka	Velika Gorica
20:00 CEST (UTC+02:00)	Ndockyt (yellow card) 11'; Kolar (yellow card) 73'; Pršir (yellow card) 85'	Report	Gojak (yellow card) 20'; Janković 58'	Stadium: Stadion Radnik; Attendance: 512; Referee: Zdenko Lovrić

21 September 2024 7	Hajduk Split	4–1	Gorica	Split
20:00 CEST (UTC+02:00)	Durdov 11', 55'; Diallo (yellow card) 43'; Livaja 71' (pen.); Sigur 74'	Report	Prpić 5' (o.g.); Ndockyt (yellow card) 55'	Stadium: Stadion Poljud; Attendance: 18,764; Referee: Dario Bel

30 September 2024 8	Gorica	2–1	Slaven Belupo	Velika Gorica
16:00 CEST (UTC+02:00)	Pršir 28' (pen.); Banić (yellow card) 60'; Šlogar 90+4'	Report	Martinović 30'; Božić (yellow card) 45+1'; Bosec (yellow card) 54'; Caimacov (yellow card) 69'; Lučić (yellow card) 74'	Stadium: Stadion Radnik; Attendance: 586; Referee: Ante Terzić

5 October 2024 9	Lokomotiva	2–0	Gorica	Zagreb
16:00 CEST (UTC+02:00)	Vranjković 26'; Smakaj (yellow card) 58'; Kolinger (yellow card) 80'; Vrbančić 85'	Report	Pršir (yellow card) 81'	Stadium: Stadion Kranjčevićeva; Attendance: 372; Referee: Zdenko Lovrić

20 October 2024 10	Varaždin	2–1	Gorica	Varaždin
18:30 CEST (UTC+02:00)	Mitrovski 19'; Belcar (yellow card) 28'; Boršić (yellow card) 39'; L. Mamić 51'; Latković (yellow card) 74'	Report	Kolar 55'; Majić (yellow card) 71'	Stadium: Stadion Varteks; Attendance: 1,387; Referee: Oliver Romić

27 October 2024 11	Gorica	1–0	Istra 1961	Velika Gorica
18:30 CET (UTC+01:00)	Kapulica (yellow card) 55'; Leš (yellow card) 62'; Šlogar 84'	Report	Lekweiry (yellow card) 40'; Marešić (yellow card) 83'	Stadium: Stadion Radnik; Attendance: 813; Referee: Ante Čulina

2 November 2024 12	Osijek	2–0	Gorica	Osijek
17:30 CET (UTC+01:00)	Jelenić (yellow card) 27'; Jugović (yellow card) 33'; Leš 34' (o.g.); Tuia (yellow card) 40'; Soldo (yellow card) 58'; Jakupović (yellow card) 87'; Pušić 90'	Report	Mikanović (yellow card) 58'; Pavlović (yellow card) 83'	Stadium: Opus Arena; Attendance: 6,875; Referee: Ante Terzić

9 November 2024 13	Gorica	2–2	Dinamo Zagreb	Velika Gorica
15:00 CET (UTC+01:00)	Šlogar (yellow card) 2'; Kolar 14'; Krizmanić 62'; Ndockyt (yellow card) 69'; Štiglec (yellow card) 73'; Banić (yellow card) 75'; Steenvoorden (yellow card) 90+4'	Report	Špikić 45'; Mbuku 86'; Ristovski (yellow card) 90'	Stadium: Stadion Radnik; Attendance: 5,138; Referee: Dario Bel

30 November 2024 14	Šibenik	1–0	Gorica	Šibenik
17:45 CET (UTC+01:00)	Agyemang 37'; Roca (yellow card) 90+3'; Prekodravac (yellow card) 90+4'; Zdunić (yellow card) 90+4'; Božić (yellow card) 90+5'	Report	Maloča (yellow card) 75'; Ndockyt (yellow card) 83'	Stadium: Stadion Šubićevac; Attendance: 546; Referee: Mateo Erceg

30 November 2024 15	Rijeka	1–0	Gorica	Rijeka
17:30 CET (UTC+01:00)	Selahi (red card) 11'; Devetak (yellow card) 16'; Rukavina 85'; Radeljić (yellow card) 86'	Report	Šlogar (yellow card) 43'	Stadium: Stadion Rujevica; Attendance: 3,643; Referee: Igor Pajač

7 December 2024 16	Gorica	1–0	Hajduk Split	Velika Gorica
17:30 CET (UTC+01:00)	Kolar (yellow card) 48'; Krizmanić 50'; Pavlović (yellow card) 85'	Report	Šarlija (yellow card) 66'	Stadium: Stadion Radnik; Attendance: 5,146; Referee: Dario Bel

13 December 2024 17	Slaven Belupo	2–1	Gorica	Koprivnica
18:00 CET (UTC+01:00)	Lučić (yellow card) 32'; Nestorovski (yellow card) 49'; Grgić (yellow card) 49' (goal) 67'; Jagušić 82'	Report	Gashi 8'; Gurlica (yellow card) 49'; Pršir (yellow card) 57'; Leš (yellow card) 77'	Stadium: Gradski stadion Attendance: 1,367; Referee: Patrik Kolarić

21 December 2024 18	Gorica	1–4	Lokomotiva	Velika Gorica
15:00 CET (UTC+01:00)	Ndockyt (yellow card) 21'; Kolar (yellow card) 24'; Pršir 41'; Gurlica (yellow card) 90'	Report	Čop 11'; Pajač (yellow card) 49'; Mudražija 80', 82', 88'	Stadium: Stadion Radnik; Attendance: 0 Referee: Oliver Romić

25 January 2025 19	Gorica	1–1	Varaždin	Velika Gorica
15:00 CET (UTC+01:00)	Erceg 43' (yellow card) 45+2'; Fiolić (yellow card) 62'; Mikanović (yellow card) 68'	Report	Latković 34'; Antunović (yellow card) 85'; Mitrovski (yellow card) 88'	Stadium: Stadion Radnik; Attendance: 685; Referee: Zdenko Lovrić

31 January 2025 20	Istra 1961	0–0	Gorica	Pula
17:00 CET (UTC+01:00)		Report		Stadium: Stadion Aldo Drosina; Attendance: 1,068; Referee: Mario Zebec

8 February 2025 21	Gorica	1–0	Osijek	Velika Gorica
15:00 CET (UTC+01:00)	Pajaziti (yellow card) 31'; Krizmanić (yellow card) 38'; Mikanović 67' (yellow card) 90+4'	Report	Babec (yellow card) 31'; Matković (yellow card) 55'; Soldo (yellow card) 66'; Jugović (yellow card) 83'	Stadium: Stadion Radnik; Attendance: 783; Referee: Antonio Melnjak

15 February 2025 22	Dinamo Zagreb	3–1	Gorica	Zagreb
17:30 CET (UTC+01:00)	Kanga 33'; Théophile-Catherine (yellow card) 45+1'; Pjaca 75'; Hoxha (yellow card) 90+1'; Kulenović 90+6'	Report	Elezi 27' (yellow card) 32'; Čuić (yellow card) 56' (yellow-red card) 64'; Ndockyt (yellow card) 68'; Bralić (yellow card) 89'	Stadium: Stadion Maksimir; Attendance: 8,368; Referee: Zdenko Lovrić

23 February 2025 23	Gorica	1–0	Šibenik	Velika Gorica
15:00 CET (UTC+01:00)	Erceg (yellow card) 7' (yellow-red card) 43'; Elezi 23'	Report	Agyemang (yellow card) 75'; Santini (yellow card) 90+7'	Stadium: Stadion Radnik; Attendance: 821; Referee: Ante Terzić

=== Croatian Football Cup ===
11 September 2024 R1	Đakovo Croatia	1–1 (a.e.t.) (4–5 p)	Gorica	Đakovo
16:30 CEST (UTC+02:00)	Batinić (yellow card) 48'; Valentić (yellow card) 89'; Dogan 118'; Damjanović (yellow card)	Report	Matković (yellow card) 35'; Djú 92'; Gurlica (yellow card) 104'	Stadium: Đakovo; Attendance: 1,000; Referee: Marko Crnojević
	Penalties
	Luiz Correa (penalty scored); Ljulj (penalty scored); Šušak (penalty scored); Lulić (penalty scored); Dogan (penalty missed)		Maloča (penalty scored); Kolar (penalty scored); Krizmanić (penalty scored); Pajaziti (penalty scored); Pršir (penalty scored)

14 November 2024 R2	Varaždin	1–1 (a.e.t.) (4–5 p)	Gorica	Varaždin
17:00 CET (UTC+01:00)	Dabro 20'; L. Mamić (yellow card) 57'; Šegović (yellow card) 116'	Report	Pavlović 63'; Mikanović (yellow card) 73'; Pršir (yellow card) 80'; Gashi (yellow card) 113'	Stadium: Stadion Varteks; Attendance: 650; Referee: Zdenko Lovrić
	Penalties
	Poldrugač (penalty scored); Nekić (penalty scored); Alić (penalty scored); L. Mamić (penalty scored); Duvnjak (penalty missed); Maglica (penalty missed)		Majstorović (penalty scored); Pršir (penalty scored); Štiglec (penalty scored); Steenvoorden (penalty missed); Krizmanić (penalty scored); Gurlica (penalty scored)

== Player seasonal records ==
Updated 21 November 2024

=== Goals ===
Rank	Name	League	Cup	Total
1	(Croatia) Marko Kolar	3	–	3
2	(Croatia) Jurica Pršir	2	–	2
2	(Croatia) Martin Šlogar	2	–	2
2	(Serbia) Damjan Pavlović	1	1	2
5	(Croatia) Luka Kapulica	1	–	1
5	(Croatia) Krešimir Krizmanić	1	–	1
5	(Croatia) Dino Mikanović	1	–	1
5	(Republic of the Congo) Merveil Ndockyt	1	–	1
5	(Portugal) Mesaque Djú	–	1	1
Own goals		1	–	1
TOTALS		13	2	15

Source: Competitive matches

=== Clean sheets ===
Rank	Name	League	Cup	Total
1	(Croatia) Božidar Radošević	2	–	2
2	(Croatia) Ivan Banić	1	–	1
TOTALS		3	0	3

Source: Competitive matches

=== Disciplinary record ===
Number	Position	Player	HNL			Croatian Cup			Total		
Number	Position	Player	Yellow card	(yellow card) (yellow-red card)	Red card	Yellow card	(yellow card) (yellow-red card)	Red card	Yellow card	(yellow card) (yellow-red card)	Red card
2	DF	(Croatia) Dino Mikanović	1	0	0	1	0	0	2	0	0
4	DF	(Netherlands) Matthew Steenvoorden	1	0	0	0	0	0	1	0	0
5	DF	(Croatia) Mateo Leš	2	0	0	0	0	0	2	0	0
6	DF	(Croatia) Jakov Gurlica	0	0	0	1	0	0	1	0	0
8	MF	(Republic of the Congo) Merveil Ndockyt	4	0	0	0	0	0	4	0	0
10	MF	(Croatia) Jurica Pršir	3	0	0	1	0	0	4	0	0
11	FW	(Croatia) Martin Šlogar	2	0	0	0	0	0	2	0	0
21	FW	(Croatia) Marko Kolar	2	0	0	0	0	0	2	0	0
22	DF	(Croatia) Mario Maloča	1	0	0	0	0	0	1	0	0
23	MF	(Croatia) Luka Kapulica	2	0	0	0	0	0	2	0	0
23	MF	(Croatia) Luka Kapulica	1	0	0	0	0	0	1	0	0
24	FW	(Croatia) Toni Majić	1	0	0	0	0	0	1	0	0
31	GK	(Croatia) Ivan Banić	1	0	0	0	0	0	1	0	0
34	DF	(Croatia) Mario Matković	0	0	0	1	0	0	1	0	0
47	MF	(Serbia) Damjan Pavlović	1	0	0	0	0	0	1	0	0
55	MF	(Croatia) Vito Čaić	2	0	0	0	0	0	2	0	0
88	MF	(Senegal) Sekou Matar Sagna	1	0	0	0	0	0	1	0	0
90	DF	(Croatia) Dino Štiglec	2	0	0	0	0	0	2	0	0
99	FW	(Kosovo) Medin Gashi	0	0	0	1	0	0	1	0	0
TOTALS			27	0	0	5	0	0	32	0	0

=== Appearances and goals ===
Number	Position	Player	Apps	Goals	Apps	Goals	Apps	Goals
Number	Position	Player	Total		HNL (Note: First number represents appearances in starting eleven, while the second number indicates a substitute appearance.)		Croatian Cup	
1	GK	(Croatia) Karlo Žiger	3	0	0+1	0	2+0	0
2	DF	(Croatia) Dino Mikanović	14	1	12+0	1	1+1	0
4	DF	(Netherlands) Matthew Steenvoorden	4	0	1+2	0	1+0	0
5	DF	(Croatia) Mateo Leš	14	0	13+0	0	1+0	0
6	DF	(Croatia) Jakov Gurlica	3	0	0+1	0	2+0	0
7	FW	(Croatia) Ante Matej Jurić	1	0	0+1	0	0+0	0
7	MF	(Albania) Adrion Pajaziti	7	0	6+0	0	0+1	0
8	MF	(Republic of the Congo) Merveil Ndockyt	12	1	10+2	1	0+0	0
9	FW	(Bosnia and Herzegovina) Filip Čuić	0	0	0+0	0	0+0	0
10	MF	(Croatia) Jurica Pršir	14	2	12+0	2	1+1	0
11	FW	(Croatia) Martin Šlogar	13	2	3+8	2	2+0	0
12	FW	(Portugal) Mesaque Djú	9	1	2+5	0	1+1	1
14	MF	(North Macedonia) Agon Elezi	0	0	0+0	0	0+0	0
16	MF	(North Macedonia) Andrej Lazarov	1	0	0+1	0	0+0	0
17	MF	(Croatia) Vinko Skrbin	6	0	2+2	0	2+0	0
18	MF	(Croatia) Ivan Fiolić	0	0	0+0	0	0+0	0
20	MF	(Croatia) Luka Vrzić	5	0	0+5	0	0+0	0
21	FW	(Croatia) Marko Kolar	14	3	13+0	3	0+1	0
22	DF	(Croatia) Mario Maloča	14	0	13+0	0	1+0	0
23	MF	(Croatia) Luka Kapulica	13	1	10+2	1	0+1	0
24	DF	(Croatia) Mateo Bašić	0	0	0+0	0	0+0	0
24	FW	(Croatia) Toni Majić	7	0	1+6	0	0+0	0
25	DF	(Croatia) Krešimir Krizmanić	14	1	10+2	1	1+1	0
27	DF	(Slovenia) Gregor Sikošek	0	0	0+0	0	0+0	0
28	DF	(Croatia) Slavko Bralić	0	0	0+0	0	0+0	0
29	MF	(Serbia) Nikola Jojić	0	0	0+0	0	0+0	0
30	GK	(Croatia) Darijan Žarkov	0	0	0+0	0	0+0	0
31	GK	(Croatia) Ivan Banić	6	0	6+0	0	0+0	0
32	MF	(Croatia) Tibor Halilović	2	0	0+1	0	1+0	0
34	DF	(Croatia) Mario Matković	3	0	0+1	0	1+1	0
44	GK	(Croatia) Božidar Radošević	7	0	7+0	0	0+0	0
47	DF	(Croatia) Anton Krešić	0	0	0+0	0	0+0	0
47	MF	(Serbia) Damjan Pavlović	9	2	0+7	1	1+1	1
50	FW	(Croatia) Ante Erceg	0	0	0+0	0	0+0	0
55	MF	(Croatia) Vito Čaić	6	0	3+3	0	0+0	0
66	DF	(Croatia) Ante Sušak	4	0	0+4	0	0+0	0
77	FW	(Croatia) Valentino Majstorović	14	0	8+4	0	1+1	0
88	MF	(Senegal) Sekou Matar Sagna	2	0	0+1	0	1+0	0
90	DF	(Croatia) Dino Štiglec	14	0	11+1	0	1+1	0
99	FW	(Kosovo) Medin Gashi	6	0	0+4	0	2+0	0
