= 2023–24 HNK Gorica season =

HNK Gorica
2023–24 season
- Chairman: Nenad Črnko
- Manager: Željko Sopić (until 23 August 2023); Dinko Jeličić (30 August 2023 - 11 March 2024); Rajko Vidović (since 18 March 2024)
- Stadium: Stadion Radnik
- HNL: 7th
- Croatian Cup: Quarter-finals
- Top goalscorer: League: Tim Matavž (5); All: Tim Matavž; Ante Matej Jurić; Josip Mitrović; Nikola Vujnović (5 each)
- Highest home attendance: 5,791 v Dinamo Zagreb (13 April 2024)
- Lowest home attendance: 384 v Varaždin (15 December 2023)
- Average home league attendance: 1,830

The 2023–24 HNK Gorica season was the club's 15th season in existence and the 6th consecutive season in the top flight of Croatian football.

== Current squad ==
As of 23 February 2024

Note: Flags indicate national team as defined under FIFA eligibility rules; some limited exceptions apply. Players may hold more than one non-FIFA nationality.

No.	Pos.	Nation	Player
5	DF	CRO	Mateo Leš
6	MF	CRO	Marko Soldo (on loan from Dinamo Zagreb)
7	FW	CRO	Ante Matej Jurić
8	MF	CGO	Merveil Ndockyt
9	FW	NED	Sven Blummel
10	MF	CRO	Jurica Pršir (2nd Captain)
11	FW	CRO	Lenny Ilečić
12	GK	CRO	Jan Paolo Debijađi
13	DF	DEN	Alexander Munksgaard
14	MF	CRO	Josip Mitrović
15	MF	CRO	Filip Mrzljak (Captain)
16	MF	MKD	Andrej Lazarov

No.	Pos.	Nation	Player
22	DF	CRO	Mario Maloča
23	MF	CRO	Luka Kapulica
25	DF	CRO	Krešimir Krizmanić
30	MF	CRO	Luka Brlek
31	GK	CRO	Ivan Banić
34	DF	CRO	Mario Matković
41	FW	CRO	Gabriel Rukavina (on loan from Dinamo Zagreb)
44	GK	CRO	Božidar Radošević
46	FW	MNE	Nikola Vujnović
77	MF	CRO	Valentino Majstorović
89	FW	SLO	Tim Matavž
90	DF	CRO	Dino Štiglec

== Transfers ==
=== In ===
Pos	Player	Transferred from	Fee	Date	Source
MF	(Austria) Dominik Prokop	(Austria) Hartberg	Back from loan	31 May 2023	
GK	(Bosnia and Herzegovina) Faruk Dalipagić	(Croatia) Karlovac 1919	Back from loan	15 June 2023	
FW	(Brazil) Caio Da Cruz	(Croatia) Dugopolje	Back from loan	15 June 2023	
FW	(Croatia) Tin Janušić	(Croatia) Dugo Selo	Back from loan	15 June 2023	
MF	(Croatia) Lenny Ilečić	(Croatia) Dinamo Zagreb	Free	26 June 2023	
MF	(Netherlands) Sven Blummel	(Netherlands) MVV Maastricht	Free	1 July 2023	
DF	(Croatia) Mateo Leš	(Netherlands) Heracles Almelo	Free	5 July 2023	
GK	(Croatia) Božidar Radošević	No team	Free	8 July 2023	
MF	(Croatia) Marko Soldo	(Croatia) Dinamo Zagreb	Loan	14 July 2023	
DF	(Croatia) Mario Maloča	(Poland) Lechia Gdańsk	Free	26 July 2023	
MF	(Croatia) Martin Šroler	(Slovenia) Mura	Free	27 July 2023	
DF	(Denmark) Alexander Munksgaard	(Denmark) AGF	Undisclosed	2 August 2023	
MF	(Iraq) Abdullah Hameed	(Hungary) Zalaegerszeg II	Free	9 August 2023	
MF	(Croatia) Patrik Jug	(Slovenia) Ilirija 1911	Back from loan	1 January 2024	
MF	(North Macedonia) Andrej Lazarov	(Croatia) Rudeš	Free	26 January 2024	
FW	(Croatia) Gabriel Rukavina	(Croatia) Dinamo Zagreb	Loan	9 February 2024	

Source: Glasilo Hrvatskog nogometnog saveza

=== Out ===
Pos	Player	Transferred to	Fee	Date	Source
MF	(Austria) Dominik Prokop	(Austria) Hartberg	Undisclosed	31 May 2023	
DF	(Mali) Cheick Keita	No team	Free	3 June 2023	
DF	(Slovakia) Matúš Vojtko	(Slovakia) Slovan Bratislava	Back from loan	3 June 2023	
FW	(Croatia) Vinko Petković	(Croatia) Osijek	Back from loan	3 June 2023	
MF	(Croatia) Edin Julardžija	(Slovenia) Domžale	Free	13 June 2023	
FW	(Croatia) Kristian Fućak	(Croatia) Osijek	Back from loan	15 June 2023	
GK	(Croatia) Božidar Radošević	No team	Free	21 June 2023	
DF	(Croatia) Slavko Bralić	(Croatia) Osijek	Back from loan	21 June 2023	
MF	(Netherlands) Joey Suk	(Cyprus) Karmiotissa	Free	23 June 2023	
DF	(Croatia) Robert Ćosić	(Croatia) Šibenik	Free	4 July 2023	
MF	(Croatia) Toni Fruk	(Italy) Fiorentina	Back from loan	12 July 2023	
DF	(Croatia) Ivan Tomečak	(Croatia) Rudeš	Free	18 July 2023	
GK	(Croatia) Karlo Žiger	(Croatia) Sesvete	Loan	19 July 2023	
GK	(Bosnia and Herzegovina) Faruk Dalipagić	(Bosnia and Herzegovina) Sloboda Tuzla	Free	23 July 2023	
DF	(Netherlands) Matthew Steenvoorden	(Uzbekistan) Pakhtakor	Free	27 July 2023	
MF	(Croatia) Patrik Jug	(Slovenia) Ilirija 1911	Loan	28 July 2023	
MF	(Croatia) Vinko Skrbin	(Slovenia) Tolmin	Loan	28 July 2023	
DF	(France) Nathan Cruce-Corcy	(Croatia) Mladost Ždralovi	Loan	16 August 2023	
FW	(Brazil) Caio Da Cruz	(Slovenia) Radomlje	Loan	31 August 2023	
MF	(Iraq) Abdullah Hameed	No team	Free	1 January 2024	
MF	(Croatia) Martin Šroler	(Croatia) Kustošija	Free	1 January 2024	
MF	(Croatia) Patrik Jug	(Slovenia) Beltinci	Loan	14 February 2024	
DF	(Montenegro) Momčilo Raspopović	(Czech Republic) Karviná	Undisclosed	23 February 2024	

Source: Glasilo Hrvatskog nogometnog saveza

Total spending: ▼€0

Total income: ▲€0

Total expenditure: ▲€0

== Competitions ==
=== Overview ===
Competition	First match	Last match	Starting round	Final position	Record							
Competition	First match	Last match	Starting round	Final position	Pld	W	D	L	GF	GA	GD	Win %
SuperSport HNL	23 July 2023	24 May 2024	Matchday 1	7th	36	11	8	17	35	50	−15	30.56
Croatian Cup	27 September 2023	28 February 2024	First round	Quarter-finals	3	2	0	1	6	4	+2	66.67
Total					39	13	8	18	41	54	−13	33.33

Last updated: 25 May 2024
Source: Soccerway

=== SuperSport HNL ===
==== League table ====
Pos	Team	Pld	W	D	L	GF	GA	GD	Pts
5	Lokomotiva	36	12	15	9	52	45	+7	51
6	Varaždin	36	10	12	14	39	47	−8	42
7	Gorica	36	11	8	17	35	50	−15	41
8	Istra 1961	36	10	11	15	36	54	−18	41
9	Slaven Belupo	36	9	6	21	43	69	−26	33

Source: SuperSport HNL
Rules for classification: 1) Points; 2) Head-to-head points; 3) Head-to-head goal difference; 4) Head-to-head goals scored (at home if two teams tied); 5) Goal difference; 6) Goals scored; 7) Play-off
(Note: Criteria 2-4 and 7 is only used if deciding champion, teams to international competition or teams for relegation and in that case criteria 6 will not be used).

==== Results summary ====
Overall								Home						Away					
Pld	W	D	L	GF	GA	GD	Pts	W	D	L	GF	GA	GD	W	D	L	GF	GA	GD
36	11	8	17	35	50	−15	41	8	3	7	23	24	−1	3	5	10	12	26	−14

Last updated: 25 May 2024.
Source: SuperSport HNL

==== Results by round ====
Round	1	2	3	4	5	6	7	8	9	10	11	12	13	14	15	16	17	18	19	20	21	22	23	24	25	26	27	28	29	30	31	32	33	34	35	36
Ground	H	H	A	H	A	H	A	H	A	A	A	H	A	H	A	H	A	H	H	H	A	H	A	H	A	H	A	A	A	H	A	H	A	H	A	H
Result	D	W	D	L	L	D	W	W	W	L	D	W	L	W	D	W	L	D	L	L	L	L	L	W	L	L	D	W	D	L	L	L	L	W	L	W
Position	4	3	4	6	7	7	6	5	4	5	5	4	5	4	4	4	4	4	5	6	6	6	6	6	6	6	6	6	6	6	7	7	8	7	8	7

Updated to match(es) played on 25 May 2024. Source: SuperSport HNL
A = Away; H = Home; W = Win; D = Draw; L = Loss

==== Matches ====
23 July 2023 1	Gorica	1–1	Varaždin	Velika Gorica
18:45 CEST (UTC+02:00)	Vujnović 28'; Soldo (yellow card) 53'; Steenvoorden (yellow card) 77'	Report	Jelenić (yellow card) 20'; Brodić 80'; Elezi (yellow card) 90+3'	Stadium: Stadion Radnik; Attendance: 1,296; Referee: Duje Strukan

29 July 2023 2	Gorica	1–0	Lokomotiva	Velika Gorica
18:45 CEST (UTC+02:00)	Pršir (yellow card) 53'; Blummel 90+1'	Report	Kanižaj (yellow card) 71'	Stadium: Stadion Radnik; Attendance: 1,187; Referee: Dario Bel

5 August 2023 3	Dinamo Zagreb	0–0	Gorica	Zagreb
21:00 CEST (UTC+02:00)	Bernauer (yellow card) 47'; Mišić (yellow card) 90+4'	Report	Banić (yellow card) 74'; Ndockyt (yellow card) 82'; Maloča (yellow card) 90+5'	Stadium: Stadion Maksimir; Attendance: 3,005; Referee: Patrik Kolarić

20 August 2023 5	Osijek	1–0	Gorica	Osijek
21:00 CEST (UTC+02:00)	Caktaš 30' (yellow card) 43'; Brlek (yellow card) 66'	Report		Stadium: Opus Arena; Attendance: 6,679; Referee: Ante Čulina

25 August 2023 6	Gorica	2–2	Slaven Belupo	Velika Gorica
20:00 CEST (UTC+02:00)	Ndockyt 45+3', 51' (yellow card) 45+3'	Report	Crnac (yellow card) 40'; Hoxha 50'; Mioč 54'; Hlevnjak (yellow card) 72'; Marina (yellow card) 82'	Stadium: Stadion Radnik; Attendance: 1,114; Referee: Goran Pečarić

2 September 2023 7	Rudeš	0–2	Gorica	Zagreb
19:00 CEST (UTC+02:00)	Campos (yellow card) 42'; Vukmanović (yellow card) 56'; Petković (yellow card) 56'	Report	Majstorović 17'; Soldo 24'; Ndockyt (yellow card) 87'	Stadium: Stadion Kranjčevićeva; Attendance: 387; Referee: Mateo Erceg

17 September 2023 8	Gorica	2–1	Hajduk Split	Velika Gorica
17:00 CEST (UTC+02:00)	Pršir (yellow card) 63'; Raspopović (yellow card) 74'; Štiglec 87'; Jurić 90+2'	Report	Šarlija 62' (yellow card) 78'	Stadium: Stadion Radnik; Attendance: 4,514; Referee: Dario Bel

23 September 2023 9	Istra 1961	0–1	Gorica	Pula
17:00 CEST (UTC+02:00)	Hujber (yellow card) 8'; Marešić (yellow card) 79'; Petrusenko (yellow card) 90+5'	Report	V. Majstorović 36'; Ndockyt (yellow card) 54'; Jurić (yellow card) 78'	Stadium: Stadion Aldo Drosina; Attendance: 1,081; Referee: Fran Jović

30 September 2023 10	Varaždin	1–0	Gorica	Varaždin
17:00 CEST (UTC+02:00)	Postonjski 26' (pen.)	Report	Pršir (yellow card) 89'	Stadium: Stadion Varteks; Attendance: 1,683; Referee: Duje Strukan

8 October 2023 11	Lokomotiva	1–1	Gorica	Zagreb
15:00 CEST (UTC+02:00)	Tuci 52'; Marić (yellow card) 74'; Živković (yellow card) 89'	Report	Matavž 77'; Štiglec (yellow card) 85'	Stadium: Stadion Kranjčevićeva; Attendance: 883; Referee: Mateo Erceg

21 October 2023 12	Gorica	2–1	Dinamo Zagreb	Velika Gorica
18:10 CEST (UTC+02:00)	Vujnović 70'; Banić (yellow card) 79'; Jurić 90' (yellow card) 90'; Mrzljak (yellow card) 90'	Report	Vidović (yellow card) 28'; Ristovski (yellow card) 57'; Ademi 63'; Emreli (yellow card) 64'; Perić (yellow card) 69'; Kulenović (yellow card) 80'; Moharrami (yellow card) 90'	Stadium: Stadion Radnik; Attendance: 5,012; Referee: Patrik Kolarić

29 October 2023 13	Rijeka	1–0	Gorica	Rijeka
15:00 CET (UTC+01:00)	Pašalić 7' (yellow card) 59'; Selahi (yellow card) 90+3'	Report	Mrzljak (yellow card) 59'; Munksgaard (yellow card) 62'	Stadium: Stadion Rujevica; Attendance: 5,776; Referee: Duje Strukan

4 November 2023 14	Gorica	3–0	Osijek	Velika Gorica
16:00 CET (UTC+01:00)	Štiglec 45+2'; Pršir (yellow card) 63' (goal) 87'; Soldo 83'	Report	Jugović (yellow card) 41'; Omerović (yellow card) 61'; Bralić (yellow card) 72'	Stadium: Stadion Radnik; Attendance: 1,878; Referee: Duje Strukan

10 November 2023 15	Slaven Belupo	0–0	Gorica	Koprivnica
18:00 CET (UTC+01:00)	Liber (yellow card) 47'	Report	Soldo (yellow card) 45+1'	Stadium: Gradski stadion Attendance: 642; Referee: Dario Kulušić

26 November 2023 16	Gorica	3–0	Rudeš	Velika Gorica
17:10 CET (UTC+01:00)	Vujnović 16'; Blummel (yellow card) 27' (goal) 36', 45+3'	Report	Vukmanović (yellow card) 88'	Stadium: Stadion Radnik; Attendance: 872; Referee: Mateo Erceg

2 December 2023 17	Hajduk Split	3–0	Gorica	Split
17:30 CET (UTC+01:00)	Dajaku 20'; Žaper 64'; Sahiti 69'	Report		Stadium: Stadion Poljud; Attendance: 16,415; Referee: Patrik Kolarić

9 December 2023 18	Gorica	0–0	Istra 1961	Velika Gorica
14:50 CET (UTC+01:00)	Krizmanić (red card) 3'; Jurić (yellow card) 19'; Mrzljak (yellow card) 34'	Report	Kadušić (yellow card) 90+1'	Stadium: Stadion Radnik; Attendance: 438; Referee: Mateo Erceg

15 December 2023 19	Gorica	1–3	Varaždin	Velika Gorica
17:00 CET (UTC+01:00)	Matavž 80'; Soldo (yellow card) 90'	Report	Pilj (yellow card) 7'; Šego 59'; Drožđek 72' (pen.); Brodić 73'	Stadium: Stadion Radnik; Attendance: 384; Referee: Zdenko Lovrić

24 January 2024 4	Gorica	2–3	Rijeka	Velika Gorica
17:00 CET (UTC+01:00)	J. Mitrović 3' (yellow card) 7'; Raspopović (yellow card) 18'; Smolčić 26' (o.g.); Jurić (yellow card) 45+2'; Mrzljak (red card) 90+5'; Blummel (yellow card) 90+5'	Report	Hodža (yellow card) 30'; Pjaca 35' (pen.), 53'; Galešić 89'; Goda (yellow card) 90+5'	Stadium: Stadion Radnik; Attendance: 1,213; Referee: Mateo Erceg

28 January 2024 20	Gorica	1–2	Lokomotiva	Velika Gorica
15:00 CET (UTC+01:00)	Matavž 19'; Raspopović (yellow card) 42'; Pršir (yellow card) 45+2'; Jurić (yellow card) 71'; Maloča (yellow card) 88'; Munksgaard (yellow card) 89'	Report	Mudražija 15'; Čop 51' (pen.); Kalaica (yellow card) 55'; Huskić (yellow card) 88'	Stadium: Stadion Radnik; Attendance: 1,137; Referee: Ante Terzić

4 February 2024 21	Dinamo Zagreb	2–0	Gorica	Zagreb
17:15 CET (UTC+01:00)	Théophile-Catherine (yellow card) 24'; Baturina 33'; Špikić 73'; Mišić (yellow card) 89'	Report	Pršir (yellow card) 82'	Stadium: Stadion Maksimir; Attendance: 6,803; Referee: Patrik Kolarić

11 February 2024 22	Gorica	0–2	Rijeka	Velika Gorica
17:10 CET (UTC+01:00)	Leš (yellow card) 26'; Soldo (yellow card) 30'; Jurić (yellow card) 45'; Lazarov (yellow card) 90+5'	Report	Veiga (yellow card) 42'; Obregón 66' (pen.) 75' (pen.) (yellow card) 76'	Stadium: Stadion Radnik; Attendance: 1,015; Referee: Duje Strukan

18 February 2024 23	Osijek	3–0	Gorica	Osijek
15:00 CET (UTC+01:00)	Miérez 50'; Pušić 63'; Almási 72'	Report	Soldo (yellow card) 47'; Lazarov (yellow card) 84'	Stadium: Opus Arena; Attendance: 5,617; Referee: Fran Jović

25 February 2024 24	Gorica	1–0	Slaven Belupo	Velika Gorica
17:30 CET (UTC+01:00)	Matavž 59'; Munksgaard (yellow card) 90+3'	Report	Agbekpornu (yellow card) 45+1'; Lepinjica (yellow card) 67'	Stadium: Stadion Radnik; Attendance: 630; Referee: Ante Terzić

4 March 2024 25	Rudeš	2–1	Gorica	Zagreb
17:00 CET (UTC+01:00)	Ćorić 26' (pen.); Mašala 90+3'	Report	Matavž 39'; Soldo (yellow card) 78'; Matković (yellow card) 90+1'	Stadium: Stadion Kranjčevićeva; Attendance: 277; Referee: Jakov Titlić

9 March 2024 26	Gorica	0–3	Hajduk Split	Velika Gorica
17:10 CET (UTC+01:00)	Pršir (yellow card) 4'; Lazarov (yellow card) 45+1'; Munksgaard (yellow card) 52'	Report	Livaja 22'; Benrahou 31'; Pukštas 41'	Stadium: Stadion Radnik; Attendance: 4,749; Referee: Dario Bel

17 March 2024 27	Istra 1961	0–0	Gorica	Pula
15:00 CET (UTC+01:00)		Report	Mitrović (yellow card) 26'; Jurić (yellow card) 69'; Mrzljak (yellow card) 79'	Stadium: Stadion Aldo Drosina; Attendance: 1,283; Referee: Ante Terzić

30 March 2024 28	Varaždin	2–4	Gorica	Varaždin
14:50 CET (UTC+01:00)	Postonjski (yellow card) 13'; Vukčević (yellow card) 35'; Belcar 42'; Drožđek 90'	Report	Rukavina 25'; Mitrović 27'; Soldo (yellow card) 74'; Pršir 78'; Jurić 80' (yellow card) 90+1'	Stadium: Stadion Varteks; Attendance: 1,282; Referee: Dario Bel

6 April 2024 29	Lokomotiva	1–1	Gorica	Zagreb
16:50 CEST (UTC+02:00)	Leš 29' (o.g.); Šotiček (yellow card) 43'; Vranjković (yellow card) 90+3'	Report	Lazarov (yellow card) 64'; Mitrović 73'; Leš (yellow card) 75'; Majstorović (yellow card) 86' (yellow-red card) 87'	Stadium: Stadion Kranjčevićeva; Attendance: 608; Referee: Duje Strukan

13 April 2024 30	Gorica	0–2	Dinamo Zagreb	Velika Gorica
19:00 CEST (UTC+02:00)	Vujnović (yellow card) 39'; Štiglec (yellow card) 66'	Report	Kulenović 13'; Ristovski (yellow card) 39'; Mišić (yellow card) 61'; Petković (yellow card) 64'; Bulat 88'	Stadium: Stadion Radnik; Attendance: 5,791; Referee: Patrik Kolarić

21 April 2024 31	Rijeka	3–0	Gorica	Rijeka
19:30 CEST (UTC+02:00)	Fruk (yellow card) 35'; Pjaca 68'; Petrovič (yellow card) 78'; Marić 80'; Goda 89'; Smolčić (yellow card) 90+3'	Report	Pršir (yellow card) 28'; J. Mitrović (yellow card) 61'; Kapulica (yellow card) 79'	Stadium: Stadion Rujevica; Attendance: 7,103; Referee: Mateo Erceg

28 April 2024 32	Gorica	0–3	Osijek	Velika Gorica
17:00 CEST (UTC+02:00)		Report	Miérez 45+1', 52', 80'; Guedes (yellow card) 71'	Stadium: Stadion Radnik; Attendance: 812; Referee: Fran Jović

4 May 2024 33	Slaven Belupo	4–1	Gorica	Koprivnica
17:00 CEST (UTC+02:00)	Mioč 44', 80' (pen.); Božić 69'; Marić 90+4'	Report	Vujnović 41'; Matković (yellow card) 90+2'	Stadium: Gradski stadion Attendance: 673; Referee: Zdenko Lovrić

10 May 2024 34	Gorica	2–1	Rudeš	Velika Gorica
18:00 CEST (UTC+02:00)	Leš (yellow card) 21'; Jurić 60'; Mitrović 69' (red card) 74'	Report	Latković 14'; Kuzmanić (yellow card) 42'; Mašala (yellow card) 64'; Kunert (yellow card) 85'; Krušlin (yellow card) 90+3'	Stadium: Stadion Radnik; Attendance: 434; Referee: Ivana Martinčić

19 May 2024 35	Hajduk Split	2–1	Gorica	Split
17:00 CEST (UTC+02:00)	Trajkovski 30' (yellow card) 60'; Štiglec 64' (o.g.)	Report	Rukavina 23'; Matković (yellow card) 87'	Stadium: Stadion Poljud; Attendance: 10,111; Referee: Tihomir Pejin

24 May 2024 36	Gorica	2–0	Istra 1961	Velika Gorica
18:00 CEST (UTC+02:00)	Jurić (yellow card) 29'; Mrzljak (yellow card) 61'; Pršir 75'; Soldo 90+5'	Report	Iovu (yellow card) 22'; Čuić (yellow card) 38' (yellow-red card) 66'; Jaganjac (yellow card) 84'	Stadium: Stadion Radnik; Attendance: 461; Referee: Mateo Erceg

=== Croatian Football Cup ===
27 September 2023 R1	Zagorec Krapina	0–2	Gorica	Krapina
15:30 CEST (UTC+02:00)	Kunštić (yellow card) 46'; Bračević (yellow card) 71'	Report	Matković 11'; Vujnović 85'	Stadium: ŠRC Podgora; Attendance: 415; Referee: Dario Kulušić

1 November 2023 R2	Gorica	4–0	Radnik Križevci	Velika Gorica
16:30 CET (UTC+01:00)	Matković (yellow card) 8'; Kovač 51' (o.g.); Krizmanić 56'; Mitrović 88'; Soldo (yellow card) 85'; Jurić 88'	Report	Vukić (yellow card) 27'	Stadium: Stadion Radnik; Attendance: 755; Referee: Fran Jović

28 February 2024 QF	Dinamo Zagreb	4–0	Gorica	Zagreb
18:00 CET (UTC+01:00)	Vidović 9'; Brodić 26'; Kulenović 56' (pen.); Vrbančić 83'	Report	Rukavina (yellow card) 49'	Stadium: Stadion Maksimir; Attendance: 3,455; Referee: Zdenko Lovrić

== Player seasonal records ==
Updated 25 May 2024

=== Goals ===
Rank	Name	League	Cup	Total
1	(Slovenia) Tim Matavž	5	–	5
1	(Croatia) Ante Matej Jurić	4	1	5
1	(Croatia) Josip Mitrović	4	1	5
1	(Montenegro) Nikola Vujnović	4	1	5
5	(Netherlands) Sven Blummel	3	–	3
5	(Croatia) Jurica Pršir	3	–	3
5	(Croatia) Marko Soldo	3	–	3
8	(Croatia) Valentino Majstorović	2	–	2
8	(Republic of the Congo) Merveil Ndockyt	2	–	2
8	(Croatia) Gabriel Rukavina	2	–	2
8	(Croatia) Dino Štiglec	2	–	2
12	(Croatia) Krešimir Krizmanić	–	1	1
12	(Croatia) Mario Matković	–	1	1
Own goals		1	1	2
TOTALS		35	6	41

Source: Competitive matches

=== Clean sheets ===
Rank	Name	League	Cup	Total
1	(Croatia) Ivan Banić	10	–	10
2	(Croatia) Božidar Radošević	1	2	3
TOTALS		11	2	13

Source: Competitive matches

=== Disciplinary record ===
Number	Position	Player	HNL			Croatian Cup			Total		
Number	Position	Player	Yellow card	(yellow card) (yellow-red card)	Red card	Yellow card	(yellow card) (yellow-red card)	Red card	Yellow card	(yellow card) (yellow-red card)	Red card
4	DF	(Netherlands) Matthew Steenvoorden	1	0	0	0	0	0	1	0	0
5	DF	(Croatia) Mateo Leš	3	0	0	0	0	0	3	0	0
6	MF	(Croatia) Marko Soldo	7	0	0	1	0	0	8	0	0
7	FW	(Croatia) Ante Matej Jurić	9	0	0	0	0	0	9	0	0
8	MF	(Republic of the Congo) Merveil Ndockyt	4	0	0	0	0	0	4	0	0
9	FW	(Netherlands) Sven Blummel	2	0	0	0	0	0	2	0	0
10	MF	(Croatia) Jurica Pršir	8	0	0	0	0	0	8	0	0
13	DF	(Denmark) Alexander Munksgaard	4	0	0	0	0	0	4	0	0
14	FW	(Croatia) Josip Mitrović	3	0	1	0	0	0	3	0	1
15	MF	(Croatia) Filip Mrzljak	5	0	1	0	0	0	5	0	1
16	MF	(North Macedonia) Andrej Lazarov	4	0	0	0	0	0	4	0	0
20	DF	(Montenegro) Momčilo Raspopović	3	0	0	0	0	0	3	0	0
22	DF	(Croatia) Mario Maloča	2	0	0	0	0	0	2	0	0
23	MF	(Croatia) Luka Kapulica	1	0	0	0	0	0	1	0	0
25	DF	(Croatia) Krešimir Krizmanić	0	0	1	0	0	0	0	0	1
31	GK	(Croatia) Ivan Banić	2	0	0	0	0	0	2	0	0
34	DF	(Croatia) Mario Matković	3	0	0	1	0	0	4	0	0
41	FW	(Croatia) Gabriel Rukavina	0	0	0	1	0	0	1	0	0
46	FW	(Montenegro) Nikola Vujnović	1	0	0	0	0	0	1	0	0
77	FW	(Croatia) Valentino Majstorović	0	1	0	0	0	0	0	1	0
90	DF	(Croatia) Dino Štiglec	2	0	0	0	0	0	2	0	0
TOTALS			64	1	3	3	0	0	67	1	3

=== Appearances and goals ===
Number	Position	Player	Apps	Goals	Apps	Goals	Apps	Goals
Number	Position	Player	Total		HNL (Note: First number represents appearances in starting eleven, while the second number indicates a substitute appearance.)		Croatian Cup	
4	DF	(Netherlands) Matthew Steenvoorden	1	0	1+0	0	0+0	0
5	DF	(Croatia) Mateo Leš	26	0	15+8	0	3+0	0
6	MF	(Croatia) Marko Soldo	37	3	25+9	3	3+0	0
7	FW	(Croatia) Ante Matej Jurić	34	5	9+22	4	2+1	1
8	MF	(Republic of the Congo) Merveil Ndockyt	15	2	13+0	2	0+2	0
9	FW	(Netherlands) Sven Blummel	22	3	3+16	3	3+0	0
10	MF	(Croatia) Jurica Pršir	37	3	32+2	3	2+1	0
11	FW	(Croatia) Lenny Ilečić	16	0	2+13	0	0+1	0
13	DF	(Denmark) Alexander Munksgaard	30	0	17+11	0	2+0	0
14	FW	(Croatia) Josip Mitrović	34	5	30+2	4	1+1	1
15	MF	(Croatia) Filip Mrzljak	32	0	26+4	0	1+1	0
16	MF	(North Macedonia) Andrej Lazarov	13	0	7+6	0	0+0	0
19	FW	(Senegal) Arona Fall	3	0	0+3	0	0+0	0
20	DF	(Montenegro) Momčilo Raspopović	20	0	18+1	0	1+0	0
20	MF	(Croatia) Luka Vrzić	5	0	0+5	0	0+0	0
22	DF	(Croatia) Mario Maloča	36	0	33+1	0	2+0	0
23	MF	(Croatia) Luka Kapulica	27	0	4+20	0	2+1	0
24	MF	(Croatia) Martin Šroler	6	0	0+4	0	2+0	0
25	DF	(Croatia) Krešimir Krizmanić	31	1	25+4	0	2+0	1
31	GK	(Croatia) Ivan Banić	33	0	33+0	0	0+0	0
34	DF	(Croatia) Mario Matković	11	1	5+3	0	2+1	1
38	DF	(Croatia) Ino Vuko	1	0	0+1	0	0+0	0
40	DF	(Serbia) Đuro-Giulio Đekić	3	0	2+0	0	0+1	0
41	FW	(Croatia) Gabriel Rukavina	16	2	14+1	2	0+1	0
44	GK	(Croatia) Božidar Radošević	6	0	3+0	0	3+0	0
46	FW	(Montenegro) Nikola Vujnović	29	5	22+5	4	1+1	1
77	FW	(Croatia) Valentino Majstorović	19	2	11+8	2	0+0	0
88	MF	(Senegal) Sekou Matar Sagna	9	0	0+9	0	0+0	0
89	FW	(Slovenia) Tim Matavž	26	5	13+11	5	1+1	0
90	DF	(Croatia) Dino Štiglec	35	2	33+1	2	0+1	0
99	MF	(Iraq) Abdullah Hameed	1	0	0+0	0	0+1	0
