= 2022–23 HNK Gorica season =

HNK Gorica
2022–23 season
- Chairman: Nenad Črnko
- Manager: Samir Toplak (until 26 August 2022); Igor Angelovski (27 August 2022 - 5 November 2022); Željko Sopić (since 26 November 2022)
- Stadium: Stadion Radnik
- HNL: 9th
- Croatian Cup: Second round
- Top goalscorer: League: Toni Fruk (7); All: Toni Fruk (7)
- Highest home attendance: 4,084 v Dinamo Zagreb (1 April 2023)
- Lowest home attendance: 492 v Osijek (17 September 2022)
- Average home league attendance: 1,724

The 2022–23 HNK Gorica season was the club's 14th season in existence and the 5th consecutive season in the top flight of Croatian football.

== Current squad ==
As of 2 April 2023

Note: Flags indicate national team as defined under FIFA eligibility rules; some limited exceptions apply. Players may hold more than one non-FIFA nationality.

| No. | Pos. | Nation | Player |
|---|---|---|---|
| 1 | GK | CRO | Karlo Žiger |
| 4 | DF | NED | Matthew Steenvoorden |
| 7 | FW | CRO | Ante Matej Jurić |
| 8 | MF | NED | Joey Suk |
| 9 | FW | CRO | Kristian Fućak (on loan from Osijek) |
| 10 | MF | CRO | Jurica Pršir (2nd Captain) |
| 11 | MF | CRO | Edin Julardžija |
| 13 | DF | CRO | Robert Ćosić |
| 14 | FW | CRO | Josip Mitrović |
| 15 | MF | CRO | Filip Mrzljak (Captain) |
| 16 | MF | CRO | Toni Fruk (on loan from Fiorentina) |
| 17 | MF | CRO | Vinko Skrbin |
| 20 | DF | MNE | Momčilo Raspopović |
| 21 | GK | CRO | Božidar Radošević |

| No. | Pos. | Nation | Player |
|---|---|---|---|
| 22 | DF | SVK | Matúš Vojtko (on loan from Slovan Bratislava) |
| 23 | MF | CRO | Luka Kapulica |
| 25 | DF | CRO | Krešimir Krizmanić |
| 31 | GK | CRO | Ivan Banić |
| 32 | DF | CRO | Slavko Bralić (on loan from Osijek) |
| 33 | DF | MLI | Cheick Keita |
| 44 | DF | CRO | Ivan Tomečak |
| 46 | FW | MNE | Nikola Vujnović |
| 77 | FW | CRO | Valentino Majstorović |
| 89 | FW | SLO | Tim Matavž |
| 90 | DF | CRO | Dino Štiglec |
| 95 | FW | CRO | Vinko Petković (on loan from Osijek) |
| 99 | MF | CGO | Merveil Ndockyt |

== Transfers ==
=== In ===
| Pos | Player | Transferred from | Fee | Date | Source |
|---|---|---|---|---|---|
| DF | (Montenegro) Momčilo Raspopović | (Montenegro) Budućnost Podgorica | Free | 30 May 2022 | |
| GK | (Croatia) Dominik Kotarski | (Netherlands) Ajax Amsterdam | 1,000,000 € | 15 June 2022 | |
| FW | (Croatia) Josip Ivan Zorica | (Croatia) Kustošija | Back from loan | 15 June 2022 | |
| MF | (Croatia) Tin Zavalić | (Croatia) Karlovac 1919 | Back from loan | 15 June 2022 | |
| FW | (Croatia) Fran Brodić | (Croatia) Varaždin | Back from loan | 15 June 2022 | |
| DF | (Albania) Albi Doka | (Hungary) Honvéd | Back from loan | 15 June 2022 | |
| MF | (Croatia) Edin Julardžija | (Croatia) Dinamo Zagreb | Free | 21 June 2022 | |
| DF | (United States) Amet Korça | (Croatia) Dubrava | Undisclosed | 22 June 2022 | |
| MF | (Ukraine) Roman Plyushch | (Ukraine) Shakhtar Donetsk U19 | Free | 27 June 2022 | |
| GK | (Croatia) Karlo Žiger | (England) Chelsea U23 | Free | 29 June 2022 | |
| GK | (Croatia) Ivan Banić | (Slovenia) Olimpija Ljubljana | Recalled from loan | 4 July 2022 | |
| DF | (Slovakia) Matúš Vojtko | (Slovakia) Slovan Bratislava | Loan | 11 July 2022 | |
| FW | (Australia) Deni Jurić | (Croatia) Dinamo Zagreb | Loan | 11 July 2022 | |
| MF | (Brazil) Wallace | Austria Lustenau | Free | 14 July 2022 | |
| DF | (Senegal) Moussa Wagué | (Spain) Barcelona | Free | 18 July 2022 | |
| MF | (Croatia) Fran Tomek | (Croatia) Dinamo Zagreb | Loan | 19 July 2022 | |
| MF | (Republic of the Congo) Merveil Ndockyt | (Croatia) Osijek | Free | 25 July 2022 | |
| MF | (Zambia) Albert Kangwanda | (Zambia) Kafue Celtic | Free | 4 August 2022 | |
| MF | (Zambia) Peter Chikola | (Zambia) Kafue Celtic | Free | 25 August 2022 | |
| MF | (Austria) Dominik Prokop | (Germany) Wehen Wiesbaden | Undisclosed | 31 August 2022 | |
| MF | (Australia) Tyrese Francois | (England) Fulham | Loan | 2 September 2022 | |
| FW | (Montenegro) Nikola Vujnović | (Serbia) Voždovac | Free | 5 September 2022 | |
| MF | (Croatia) Filip Mrzljak | No team | Free | 10 December 2022 | |
| DF | (Croatia) Slavko Bralić | (Croatia) Osijek | Loan | 13 December 2022 | |
| FW | (Croatia) Kristian Fućak | (Croatia) Osijek | Loan | 13 December 2022 | |
| FW | (Croatia) Vinko Petković | (Croatia) Osijek | Loan | 13 December 2022 | |
| DF | (Croatia) Robert Ćosić | (Croatia) Rudeš | Free | 23 December 2022 | |
| FW | (Croatia) Valentino Majstorović | No team | Free | 28 December 2022 | |
| GK | (Croatia) Jan Paolo Debijađi | (Croatia) Dubrava | Recalled from loan | 1 January 2023 | |
| FW | (Slovenia) Tim Matavž | (Cyprus) Omonia | Free | 16 January 2023 | |
| GK | (Croatia) Božidar Radošević | (Croatia) Varaždin | Free | 1 February 2023 | |
| DF | (Croatia) Ivan Tomečak | (Croatia) Lokomotiva Zagreb | Free | 1 February 2023 | |
| DF | (Croatia) Dino Štiglec | (Israel) Hapoel Haifa | Free | 10 February 2023 | |
| FW | (Croatia) Tin Janušić | (Croatia) Sesvete | Back from loan | 15 February 2023 | |

Source: Glasilo Hrvatskog nogometnog saveza

=== Out ===
| Pos | Player | Transferred to | Fee | Date | Source |
|---|---|---|---|---|---|
| MF | (Croatia) Matija Dvorneković | No team | Retired | 31 May 2022 | |
| MF | (Nigeria) Iyayi Atiemwen | (Croatia) Dinamo Zagreb | Back from loan | 6 June 2022 | |
| FW | (Iran) Younes Delfi | (Belgium) Charleroi | Back from loan | 6 June 2022 | |
| FW | (Nigeria) Olabiran Muyiwa | (Ukraine) Dynamo Kyiv | Back from loan | 6 June 2022 | |
| DF | (Nigeria) Musa Muhammed | No team | Free | 7 June 2022 | |
| FW | (North Macedonia) Vlatko Stojanovski | No team | Free | 7 June 2022 | |
| DF | (Albania) Albi Doka | (Hungary) Honvéd | 300,000 € | 14 June 2022 | |
| MF | (Croatia) Tin Zavalić | No team | Free | 15 June 2022 | |
| FW | (Croatia) Fran Brodić | (Croatia) Varaždin | Free | 15 June 2022 | |
| GK | (Croatia) Dominik Kotarski | (Greece) PAOK | 2,000,000 € | 27 June 2022 | |
| FW | (Croatia) Josip Ivan Zorica | No team | Free | 30 June 2022 | |
| DF | (Croatia) Jozo Šimunović | No team | Free | 1 July 2022 | |
| MF | (Croatia) Hrvoje Babec | (Latvia) Riga | 1,600,000 € | 10 July 2022 | |
| FW | (Senegal) Matar Dieye | (Hungary) Debrecen | 130,000 € | 3 August 2022 | |
| GK | (Croatia) Jan Paolo Debijađi | (Croatia) Dubrava | Loan | 12 August 2022 | |
| GK | (Bosnia and Herzegovina) Faruk Dalipagić | (Croatia) Karlovac 1919 | Loan | 18 August 2022 | |
| MF | (Croatia) Patrik Jug | (Croatia) Zagorec Krapina | Dual registration | 18 August 2022 | |
| MF | (Australia) Anthony Kalik | (Croatia) Hajduk Split | 300,000 € | 26 August 2022 | |
| MF | (Zambia) Peter Chikola | (Croatia) Zagorec Krapina | Dual registration | 31 August 2022 | |
| MF | (Croatia) Vinko Skrbin | (Croatia) Hrvatski Dragovoljac | Dual registration | 31 August 2022 | |
| FW | (Brazil) Caio Da Cruz | (Croatia) Hrvatski Dragovoljac | Dual registration | 31 August 2022 | |
| FW | (Croatia) Ante Matej Jurić | (Croatia) Hrvatski Dragovoljac | Dual registration | 31 August 2022 | |
| FW | (Zambia) Albert Kangwanda | (Croatia) Hrvatski Dragovoljac | Dual registration | 31 August 2022 | |
| FW | (Croatia) Tin Janušić | (Croatia) Sesvete | Loan | 2 September 2022 | |
| DF | (Bosnia and Herzegovina) Aleksandar Jovičić | (Hungary) Kisvárda | Free | 16 November 2022 | |
| MF | (Lithuania) Paulius Golubickas | No team | Free | 22 November 2022 | |
| DF | (Senegal) Moussa Wagué | No team | Free | 9 December 2022 | |
| FW | (Australia) Deni Jurić | (Croatia) Dinamo Zagreb | Back from loan | 9 December 2022 | |
| MF | (Brazil) Wallace | No team | Free | 2 January 2023 | |
| MF | (Zambia) Albert Kangwanda | (Zambia) Red Arrows | Free | 7 January 2023 | |
| DF | (United States) Amet Korça | (United States) FC Dallas | Undisclosed | 10 January 2023 | |
| MF | (Australia) Tyrese Francois | (England) Fulham | Back from loan | 10 January 2023 | |
| DF | (Bosnia and Herzegovina) Saša Marjanović | (Slovakia) Zemplín Michalovce | Undisclosed | 17 January 2023 | |
| MF | (Croatia) Fran Tomek | (Croatia) Dinamo Zagreb | Recalled from loan | 27 January 2023 | |
| MF | (Zambia) Peter Chikola | (Spain) Cádiz CF Mirandilla | Free | 31 January 2023 | |
| MF | (Austria) Dominik Prokop | (Austria) Hartberg | Loan | 6 February 2023 | |
| GK | (Croatia) Jan Paolo Debijađi | (Croatia) Hrvatski Dragovoljac | Dual registration | 14 February 2023 | |
| DF | (France) Nathan Cruce-Corcy | (Croatia) Zagorec Krapina | Dual registration | 15 February 2023 | |
| FW | (Brazil) Caio Da Cruz | (Croatia) Dugopolje | Loan | 15 February 2023 | |
| FW | (Croatia) Tin Janušić | (Croatia) Dugo Selo | Loan | 15 February 2023 | |

Source: Glasilo Hrvatskog nogometnog saveza

Total spending: ▼1,000,000 €

Total income: ▲4,330,000 €

Total expenditure: ▲3,330,000 €

== Competitions ==
=== Overview ===
| Competition | First match | Last match | Starting round | Final position | Record | | | | | | | |
| Competition | First match | Last match | Starting round | Final position | Pld | W | D | L | GF | GA | GD | Win % |
|---|---|---|---|---|---|---|---|---|---|---|---|---|
| SuperSport HNL | 16 July 2022 | | Matchday 1 | 9th | 36 | 7 | 11 | 18 | 36 | 50 | −14 | 19.44 |
| Croatian Cup | 18 October 2022 | 9 November 2022 | First round | Second round | 2 | 1 | 0 | 1 | 3 | 4 | −1 | 50.00 |
| Total | | | | | 38 | 8 | 11 | 19 | 39 | 54 | −15 | 21.05 |

Last updated: 29 May 2023
Source: Soccerway

=== SuperSport HNL ===
==== League table ====
| Pos | Team | Pld | W | D | L | GF | GA | GD | Pts | Qualification or relegation |
|---|---|---|---|---|---|---|---|---|---|---|
| 6 | Varaždin | 36 | 12 | 10 | 14 | 41 | 51 | −10 | 46 | |
| 7 | Lokomotiva | 36 | 11 | 10 | 15 | 45 | 50 | −5 | 43 | |
| 8 | Slaven Belupo | 36 | 10 | 13 | 13 | 27 | 46 | −19 | 43 | |
| 9 | Gorica | 36 | 7 | 11 | 18 | 36 | 50 | −14 | 32 | |
| 10 | Šibenik (R) | 36 | 5 | 12 | 19 | 24 | 56 | −32 | 27 | Relegation to First Football League |

Source: SuperSport HNL
Rules for classification: 1) Points; 2) Head-to-head points; 3) Head-to-head goal difference; 4) Head-to-head goals scored (at home if two teams tied); 5) Goal difference; 6) Goals scored; 7) Play-off
(Note: Criteria 2-4 and 7 is only used if deciding champion, teams to international competition or teams for relegation and in that case criteria 6 will not be used).
(R) Relegated

==== Results summary ====
| Overall | | | | | | | | Home | | | | | | Away | | | | | |
| Pld | W | D | L | GF | GA | GD | Pts | W | D | L | GF | GA | GD | W | D | L | GF | GA | GD |
|---|---|---|---|---|---|---|---|---|---|---|---|---|---|---|---|---|---|---|---|
| 36 | 7 | 11 | 18 | 36 | 50 | −14 | 32 | 6 | 6 | 6 | 19 | 20 | −1 | 1 | 5 | 12 | 17 | 30 | −13 |

Last updated: 29 May 2023.
Source: SuperSport HNL

==== Results by round ====
| Round | 1 | 2 | 3 | 4 | 5 | 6 | 7 | 8 | 9 | 10 | 11 | 12 | 13 | 14 | 15 | 16 | 17 | 18 | 19 | 20 | 21 | 22 | 23 | 24 | 25 | 26 | 27 | 28 | 29 | 30 | 31 | 32 | 33 | 34 | 35 | 36 |
|---|---|---|---|---|---|---|---|---|---|---|---|---|---|---|---|---|---|---|---|---|---|---|---|---|---|---|---|---|---|---|---|---|---|---|---|---|
| Ground | A | H | A | A | H | A | H | A | H | H | A | H | H | A | H | A | H | A | A | H | A | A | H | A | H | A | H | H | A | H | H | A | H | A | H | A |
| Result | L | D | D | L | W | L | L | L | L | L | D | L | L | L | D | L | D | D | L | L | L | L | W | D | W | L | D | W | W | W | D | D | D | L | W | L |
| Position | 7 | 8 | 9 | 10 | 7 | 7 | 9 | 9 | 9 | 10 | 10 | 10 | 10 | 10 | 10 | 10 | 10 | 10 | 10 | 10 | 10 | 10 | 10 | 10 | 10 | 10 | 10 | 10 | 10 | 9 | 9 | 9 | 9 | 9 | 9 | 9 |

Updated to match(es) played on 28 May 2023. Source: SuperSport HNL
A = Away; H = Home; W = Win; D = Draw; L = Loss

==== Matches ====
| 16 July 2022 1 | Osijek | 2–1 | Gorica | Osijek |
| 19:00 CEST (UTC+02:00) | Nejašmić (yellow card) 33'; Beljo 62', 74' (pen.); Miérez (yellow card) 90+2' | Report | Golubickas (yellow card) 15'; Krizmanić (yellow card) 21'; Lončar 66' (o.g.); Jovičić (yellow card) 73'; Keita (yellow card) 80'; Mitrović (yellow card) 86'; Julardžija (red card) 86'; Steenvoorden (yellow card) 90+2' | Stadium: Gradski Vrt Stadium; Attendance: 3,590; Referee: Ante Čuljak |

| 23 July 2022 2 | Gorica | 0–0 | Šibenik | Velika Gorica |
| 18:55 CEST (UTC+02:00) | Kalik (yellow card) 75'; Mitrović (yellow card) 89' | Report | Mina (yellow card) 24' | Stadium: Stadion Radnik; Attendance: 715; Referee: Ante Čulina |

| 31 July 2022 3 | Rijeka | 1–1 | Gorica | Rijeka |
| 21:00 CEST (UTC+02:00) | M. Frigan 39'; Hodža (yellow card) 53'; Álvarez (yellow card) 81'; Labrović (yellow card) 90+3' | Report | Raspopović (yellow card) 34'; Kalik 77' (yellow card) 90+3'; A. M. Jurić (yellow card) 84'; D. Jurić (yellow card) 84' | Stadium: Stadion Rujevica; Attendance: 4,000; Referee: Tihomir Pejin |

| 13 August 2022 5 | Gorica | 3–2 | Lokomotiva | Velika Gorica |
| 18:30 CEST (UTC+02:00) | Kalik 61' (pen.); Fruk 66'; A. M. Jurić (yellow card) 70'; Vojtko (yellow card) 77'; Da Cruz 79'; Raspopović (yellow card) 90+5' | Report | Vasilj 9'; Tuci 84'; de Haas (yellow card) 90' | Stadium: Stadion Radnik; Attendance: 765; Referee: Patrik Kolarić |

| 19 August 2022 6 | Slaven Belupo | 2–1 | Gorica | Koprivnica |
| 20:00 CEST (UTC+02:00) | Tepšić (yellow card) 30'; Talys (yellow card) 36'; Krstanović (yellow card) 66'; Kocijan (yellow card) 69'; Crnac 78'; Žuljević 83'; Fanimo (yellow card) 86' | Report | Raspopović 4'; Suk (yellow card) 64' | Stadium: Gradski stadion Attendance: 673; Referee: Ante Čuljak |

| 26 August 2022 7 | Gorica | 0–2 | Istra 1961 | Velika Gorica |
| 20:00 CEST (UTC+02:00) | Da Cruz (yellow card) 45'; Suk (yellow card) 49'; Wagué (yellow card) 90+3' | Report | Erceg 81', 90+4' | Stadium: Stadion Radnik; Attendance: 1,356; Referee: Ivan Bebek |

| 3 September 2022 8 | Varaždin | 2–1 | Gorica | Varaždin |
| 18:55 CEST (UTC+02:00) | Elezi 10', 43'; Belcar (yellow card) 51'; Pilj (yellow card) 69'; Šego (red card) 74'; Pëllumbi (yellow card) 81' | Report | D. Jurić 61' (yellow card) 77' (yellow-red card) 90+3'; Fruk (yellow card) 64'; Steenvoorden (yellow card) 88' | Stadium: Stadion Varteks; Attendance: 2,263; Referee: Radoslav Petrov Gidženov |

| 10 September 2022 9 | Gorica | 0–1 | Dinamo Zagreb | Velika Gorica |
| 21:05 CEST (UTC+02:00) | Wagué (yellow card) 50'; Tomek (yellow card) 90+1' | Report | Ivanušec (yellow card) 85'; Oršić 90+3' | Stadium: Stadion Radnik; Attendance: 3,641; Referee: Zdenko Lovrić |

| 17 September 2022 10 | Gorica | 0–1 | Osijek | Velika Gorica |
| 16:55 CEST (UTC+02:00) | Suk (yellow card) 57'; Steenvoorden (yellow card) 70'; Golubickas (yellow card) 81'; Jovičić (yellow card) 84'; Banić (yellow card) 90+3'; Raspopović (red card) 90+3' | Report | Gržan 19'; Barri (yellow card) 26'; Miérez (yellow card) 66'; Lončar (yellow card) 90+2' | Stadium: Stadion Radnik; Attendance: 492; Referee: Duje Strukan |

| 2 October 2022 11 | Šibenik | 1–1 | Gorica | Šibenik |
| 17:30 CEST (UTC+02:00) | Mesa (yellow card) 10'; Mina (yellow card) 50'; Kreković (yellow card) 67'; Arai (yellow card) 71' (yellow-red card) 73'; Delić 82' (pen.) | Report | Fruk 38'; Pršir (yellow card) 45' (yellow-red card) 55'; Julardžija (yellow card) 75' (yellow-red card) 90+1'; Mitrović (yellow card) 76'; Vujnović (yellow card) 89' | Stadium: Stadion Šubićevac; Attendance: 876; Referee: Fran Jović |

| 9 October 2022 12 | Gorica | 0–2 | Rijeka | Velika Gorica |
| 17:10 CEST (UTC+02:00) | Jovičić (yellow card) 58'; Ndockyt (yellow card) 68'; Fruk (yellow card) 71'; Banić (yellow card) 72'; Francois (yellow card) 90' | Report | Vukčević (yellow card) 13'; Álvarez (yellow card) 21'; Hodža (yellow card) 21'; Ampem 56'; Halilović (yellow card) 66' (goal) 68' (pen.) | Stadium: Stadion Radnik; Attendance: 1,437; Referee: Duje Strukan |

| 15 October 2022 13 | Gorica | 0–1 | Hajduk Split | Velika Gorica |
| 19:05 CEST (UTC+02:00) | Krizmanić (yellow card) 25'; Wagué (red card) 49'; Pršir (yellow card) 49'; Vojtko (yellow card) 90+7' | Report | Livaja 90+8' | Stadium: Stadion Radnik; Attendance: 3,878; Referee: Dario Bel |

| 22 October 2022 14 | Lokomotiva | 2–1 | Gorica | Zagreb |
| 15:00 CEST (UTC+02:00) | Tuci (yellow card) 17'; Kulenović 32'; Stojković (yellow card) 55'; Bubanja (yellow card) 57'; Goričan 74'; Mersinaj (yellow card) 89' | Report | Fruk 52'; Krizmanić (yellow card) 75'; Da Cruz (yellow card) 88' | Stadium: Stadion Kranjčevićeva; Attendance: 730; Referee: Jakov Titlić |

| 26 October 2022 4 | Hajduk Split | 3–1 | Gorica | Split |
| 16:30 CEST (UTC+02:00) | Livaja 2', 59' (pen.) (yellow card) 12'; Sahiti (yellow card) 17'; Vuković (yellow card) 43'; Awaziem 72' | Report | Francois 9'; Korça (yellow card) 24' (red card) 85'; Jovičić (yellow card) 58'; Ndockyt (yellow card) 90' | Stadium: Stadion Poljud; Attendance: 12,219; Referee: Fran Jović |

| 31 October 2022 15 | Gorica | 1–1 | Slaven Belupo | Velika Gorica |
| 14:00 CET (UTC+01:00) | Mitrović (yellow card) 19'; Steenvoorden (yellow card) 27'; Vujnović 45+2' | Report | Zirdum 10'; Kocijan (yellow card) 14' (yellow-red card) 21'; Mudražija (yellow card) 17'; Bosec (yellow card) 45+1' | Stadium: Stadion Radnik; Attendance: 575; Referee: Ivan Bebek |

| 4 November 2022 16 | Istra 1961 | 1–0 | Gorica | Pula |
| 18:00 CET (UTC+01:00) | Mlinar (yellow card) 34'; Cáseres (yellow card) 48'; Galilea (yellow card) 68'; Hujber (yellow card) 74'; Bakrar 90' | Report | Steenvoorden (yellow card) 45+4'; Francois (yellow card) 57'; Keita (yellow card) 87' | Stadium: Stadion Aldo Drosina; Attendance: 890; Referee: Ante Čulina |

| 18 January 2023 17 | Gorica | 0–0 | Varaždin | Velika Gorica |
| 15:00 CET (UTC+01:00) | Fruk (yellow card) 56'; Pršir (yellow card) 59'; Vojtko (yellow card) 65' | Report | Stolnik (yellow card) 22'; Elezi (yellow card) 67' | Stadium: Stadion Radnik; Attendance: 990; Referee: Zdenko Lovrić |

| 21 January 2023 18 | Dinamo Zagreb | 0–0 | Gorica | Zagreb |
| 17:30 CET (UTC+01:00) | Bočkaj (yellow card) 61'; Mišić (yellow card) 80' | Report | Steenvoorden (yellow card) 12'; Fućak (yellow card) 73'; Raspopović (yellow card) 90+5' | Stadium: Stadion Maksimir; Attendance: 3,568; Referee: Duje Strukan |

| 29 January 2023 19 | Osijek | 2–0 | Gorica | Osijek |
| 15:00 CET (UTC+01:00) | Miérez 15'; Špoljarić 63' | Report | A. M. Jurić (yellow card) 36'; Majstorović (yellow card) 79' | Stadium: Gradski Vrt Stadium; Attendance: 2,012; Referee: Ivan Bebek |

| 5 February 2023 20 | Gorica | 0–3 | Šibenik | Velika Gorica |
| 15:00 CET (UTC+01:00) | Raspopović (yellow card) 16'; Mrzljak (yellow card) 90+4' | Report | Čanađija (yellow card) 36'; Čop 44', 90+4' (pen.); Dolček 64' | Stadium: Stadion Radnik; Attendance: 1,024; Referee: Tihomir Pejin |

| 12 February 2023 21 | Rijeka | 2–0 | Gorica | Rijeka |
| 17:10 CET (UTC+01:00) | Vukčević (yellow card) 26'; Marin 50' (pen.); Hodža (yellow card) 61'; Liber 83' | Report | Suk (yellow card) 13'; Petković (yellow card) 24'; Bralić (yellow card) 54'; Mrzljak (yellow card) 63' | Stadium: Stadion Rujevica; Attendance: 4,479; Referee: Patrik Kolarić |

| 19 February 2023 22 | Hajduk Split | 2–1 | Gorica | Split |
| 17:10 CET (UTC+01:00) | Anello (yellow card) 33'; Lovrencsics (yellow card) 36'; Livaja 58'; Fossati (yellow card) 63'; Prpić (yellow card) 68'; N. Kalinić 79'; Letaj (yellow card) 90+3' | Report | Steenvoorden (yellow card) 32'; Ndockyt (yellow card) 58'; Bralić 65' | Stadium: Stadion Poljud; Attendance: 12,362; Referee: Tihomir Pejin |

| 25 February 2023 23 | Gorica | 1–0 | Lokomotiva | Velika Gorica |
| 16:00 CET (UTC+01:00) | Mrzljak (yellow card) 41'; Mitrović (yellow card) 66'; Fućak 87'; Pršir (yellow card) 90+1' | Report | Stojković (yellow card) 22'; Bubanja (yellow card) 41'; Milićević (yellow card) 45+4'; Kulenović (yellow card) 53' | Stadium: Stadion Radnik; Attendance: 806; Referee: Duje Strukan |

| 4 March 2023 24 | Slaven Belupo | 1–1 | Gorica | Koprivnica |
| 18:10 CET (UTC+01:00) | Manaj (yellow card) 32'; Crnac 60' (yellow card) 78'; Martinaga (yellow card) 84'; Božić (yellow card) 90+2' | Report | Suk (yellow card) 49'; Mitrović 53'; Steenvoorden (red card) 75' | Stadium: Gradski stadion Attendance: 613; Referee: Ante Čulina |

| 10 March 2023 25 | Gorica | 5–4 | Istra 1961 | Velika Gorica |
| 17:00 CET (UTC+01:00) | Štiglec (yellow card) 28'; Bralić 30' (yellow card) 60'; A. M. Jurić (yellow card) 62'; Krizmanić (yellow card) 70'; Pršir 79' (pen.); Banić (yellow card) 80'; Fućak 81'; Suk 83'; Mrzljak (yellow card) 85'; Mitrović 90+6' | Report | Bakrar 13', 42'; Hujber (yellow card) 45+2'; Cáseres 55'; Marešić (yellow card) 71'; Boultam (yellow card) 74'; Majkić (yellow card) 78'; Matheus 90+5' | Stadium: Stadion Radnik; Attendance: 937; Referee: Zdenko Lovrić |

| 17 March 2023 26 | Varaždin | 2–1 | Gorica | Varaždin |
| 17:00 CET (UTC+01:00) | Brodić 53', 87' | Report | Krizmanić (yellow card) 49'; Mitrović 74' | Stadium: Stadion Varteks; Attendance: 1,585; Referee: Jakov Titlić |

| 1 April 2023 27 | Gorica | 1–1 | Dinamo Zagreb | Velika Gorica |
| 17:00 CEST (UTC+02:00) | Mitrović 85' | Report | Ljubičić 60' (yellow card) 90+5' | Stadium: Stadion Radnik; Attendance: 4,084; Referee: Ivan Bebek |

| 8 April 2023 28 | Gorica | 2–0 | Osijek | Velika Gorica |
| 15:00 CEST (UTC+02:00) | Fućak 73', 83'; Bralić (yellow card) 86' | Report | Lovrić (yellow card) 68'; Špoljarić (yellow card) 90+1' | Stadium: Stadion Radnik; Attendance: 1,349; Referee: Patrik Kolarić |

| 14 April 2023 29 | Šibenik | 0–4 | Gorica | Šibenik |
| 18:00 CEST (UTC+02:00) | Kvržić (yellow card) 40'; Dolček (yellow card) 45+2'; Perić (yellow card) 45+3'; Đira (yellow card) 90+4' | Report | Fruk 8', 18'; Ndockyt 13'; Bralić 41'; Tomečak (yellow card) 45+2'; Vujnović (yellow card) 87'; Štiglec (yellow card) 90+3' | Stadium: Stadion Šubićevac; Attendance: 659; Referee: Duje Strukan |

| 23 April 2023 30 | Gorica | 1–0 | Rijeka | Velika Gorica |
| 15:00 CEST (UTC+02:00) | Fruk (yellow card) 6'; Raspopović (yellow card) 12' (yellow-red card) 80'; Fućak (yellow card) 60' (goal) 63' | Report | M. Frigan (yellow card) 22'; Hodža (yellow card) 85'; Banda (yellow card) 90+4' | Stadium: Stadion Radnik; Attendance: 2,362; Referee: Ante Čulina |

| 26 April 2023 31 | Gorica | 0–0 | Hajduk Split | Velika Gorica |
| 19:10 CEST (UTC+02:00) | Pršir (yellow card) 15'; Banić (yellow card) 17'; Bralić (yellow card) 45+2'; Fućak (yellow card) 54'; Krizmanić (yellow card) 90+4' | Report | Benrahou (yellow card) 45+2'; Borevković (yellow card) 45+3'; Awaziem (yellow card) 65'; Anello (yellow card) 86' | Stadium: Stadion Radnik; Attendance: 3,516; Referee: Zdenko Lovrić |

| 1 May 2023 32 | Lokomotiva | 2–2 | Gorica | Zagreb |
| 16:00 CEST (UTC+02:00) | Stojković 43'; Tuci 47' | Report | Kapulica 61'; Vojtko 90+7' (yellow card) 90+8' | Stadium: Stadion Kranjčevićeva; Attendance: 833; Referee: Ivan Bebek |

| 6 May 2023 33 | Gorica | 0–0 | Slaven Belupo | Velika Gorica |
| 17:00 CEST (UTC+02:00) | | Report | Kocijan (yellow card) 22'; Crnac (yellow card) 35'; Bosec (yellow card) 59'; Marković (yellow card) 65' | Stadium: Stadion Radnik; Attendance: 1,312; Referee: Dario Bel |

| 13 May 2023 34 | Istra 1961 | 1–0 | Gorica | Pula |
| 19:10 CEST (UTC+02:00) | Erceg 33' (pen.); Kadušić (yellow card) 65' | Report | Tomečak (yellow card) 32'; Steenvoorden (yellow card) 90+6' | Stadium: Stadion Aldo Drosina; Attendance: 1,234; Referee: Ivan Bebek |

| 20 May 2023 35 | Gorica | 5–2 | Varaždin | Velika Gorica |
| 18:00 CEST (UTC+02:00) | Ndockyt 2'; Suk 22' (yellow card) 62'; Fruk 73', 86'; Steenvoorden 83' | Report | Kolarić 34'; Škaričić (yellow card) 58'; Pilj (yellow card) 81'; Težak 89' | Stadium: Stadion Radnik; Attendance: 1,784; Referee: Patrik Kolarić |

| 28 May 2023 36 | Dinamo Zagreb | 4–1 | Gorica | Zagreb |
| 19:15 CEST (UTC+02:00) | Ljubičić 23'; Ivanušec 33'; Špikić 80'; Perić 87' | Report | Ndockyt 5' (yellow card) 5' | Stadium: Stadion Maksimir; Attendance: 16,059; Referee: Ivan Bebek |

=== Croatian Football Cup ===
| 18 October 2022 R1 | Dubrava | 2–3 | Gorica | Zagreb |
| 15:00 CEST (UTC+02:00) | Boyan 1'; Ikenna (yellow card) 62'; Petriško 75' | Report | Vujnović 28' (yellow card) 52'; Jovičić (yellow card) 36'; Steenvoorden 45+1'; Mitrović 90+2' | Stadium: Kustošija; Attendance: 100; Referee: Dario Kulušić |

| 9 November 2022 R2 | Šibenik | 2–0 | Gorica | Šibenik |
| 18:00 CET (UTC+01:00) | Čop (yellow card) 31' (goal) 54' (pen.); Dolček 48'; Đaković (yellow card) 66'; Mesa (yellow card) 75' | Report | Cruce-Corcy (yellow card) 11'; Keita (yellow card) 15'; Marjanović (yellow card) 53'; Kapulica (yellow card) 64'; Wagué (yellow card) 70'; Jovičić (yellow card) 83'; Pršir (yellow card) 85' | Stadium: Stadion Šubićevac; Attendance: 309; Referee: Patrik Kolarić |

== Player seasonal records ==
Updated 29 May 2023

=== Goals ===
| Rank | Name | League | Cup | Total |
|---|---|---|---|---|
| 1 | (Croatia) Toni Fruk | 7 | – | 7 |
| 2 | (Croatia) Kristian Fućak | 5 | – | 5 |
| 2 | (Croatia) Josip Mitrović | 4 | 1 | 5 |
| 4 | (Croatia) Slavko Bralić | 3 | – | 3 |
| 4 | (Republic of the Congo) Merveil Ndockyt | 3 | – | 3 |
| 6 | (Australia) Anthony Kalik | 2 | – | 2 |
| 6 | (Netherlands) Joey Suk | 2 | – | 2 |
| 6 | (Netherlands) Matthew Steenvoorden | 1 | 1 | 2 |
| 6 | (Montenegro) Nikola Vujnović | 1 | 1 | 2 |
| 10 | (Brazil) Caio Da Cruz | 1 | – | 1 |
| 10 | (Australia) Tyrese Francois | 1 | – | 1 |
| 10 | (Australia) Deni Jurić | 1 | – | 1 |
| 10 | (Croatia) Luka Kapulica | 1 | – | 1 |
| 10 | (Croatia) Jurica Pršir | 1 | – | 1 |
| 10 | (Montenegro) Momčilo Raspopović | 1 | – | 1 |
| 10 | (Slovakia) Matúš Vojtko | 1 | – | 1 |
| Own goals | | 1 | – | 1 |
| TOTALS | | 36 | 3 | 39 |

Source: Competitive matches

=== Clean sheets ===
| Rank | Name | League | Cup | Total |
|---|---|---|---|---|
| 1 | (Croatia) Ivan Banić | 7 | – | 7 |
| 2 | (Croatia) Božidar Radošević | 2 | – | 2 |
| TOTALS | | 9 | 0 | 9 |

Source: Competitive matches

=== Disciplinary record ===
| Number | Position | Player | HNL | | | Croatian Cup | | | Total | | |
|---|---|---|---|---|---|---|---|---|---|---|---|
| Number | Position | Player | Yellow card | (yellow card) (yellow-red card) | Red card | Yellow card | (yellow card) (yellow-red card) | Red card | Yellow card | (yellow card) (yellow-red card) | Red card |
| 3 | DF | (Bosnia and Herzegovina) Aleksandar Jovičić | 4 | 0 | 0 | 2 | 0 | 0 | 6 | 0 | 0 |
| 4 | DF | (Netherlands) Matthew Steenvoorden | 8 | 0 | 1 | 0 | 0 | 0 | 8 | 0 | 1 |
| 5 | DF | (Bosnia and Herzegovina) Saša Marjanović | 0 | 0 | 0 | 1 | 0 | 0 | 1 | 0 | 0 |
| 6 | DF | (United States) Amet Korça | 1 | 0 | 1 | 0 | 0 | 0 | 1 | 0 | 1 |
| 7 | MF | (Australia) Tyrese Francois | 2 | 0 | 0 | 0 | 0 | 0 | 2 | 0 | 0 |
| 7 | FW | (Croatia) Ante Matej Jurić | 4 | 0 | 0 | 0 | 0 | 0 | 4 | 0 | 0 |
| 8 | MF | (Netherlands) Joey Suk | 6 | 0 | 0 | 0 | 0 | 0 | 6 | 0 | 0 |
| 9 | FW | (Croatia) Kristian Fućak | 3 | 0 | 0 | 0 | 0 | 0 | 3 | 0 | 0 |
| 9 | FW | (Australia) Deni Jurić | 1 | 1 | 0 | 0 | 0 | 0 | 1 | 1 | 0 |
| 10 | MF | (Croatia) Jurica Pršir | 4 | 1 | 0 | 1 | 0 | 0 | 5 | 1 | 0 |
| 11 | MF | (Croatia) Edin Julardžija | 0 | 1 | 1 | 0 | 0 | 0 | 0 | 1 | 1 |
| 14 | MF | (Croatia) Josip Mitrović | 5 | 0 | 0 | 0 | 0 | 0 | 5 | 0 | 0 |
| 15 | MF | (Croatia) Filip Mrzljak | 4 | 0 | 0 | 0 | 0 | 0 | 4 | 0 | 0 |
| 15 | DF | (Senegal) Moussa Wagué | 2 | 0 | 1 | 1 | 0 | 0 | 3 | 0 | 1 |
| 16 | MF | (Croatia) Toni Fruk | 4 | 0 | 0 | 0 | 0 | 0 | 4 | 0 | 0 |
| 19 | FW | (Brazil) Caio Da Cruz | 2 | 0 | 0 | 0 | 0 | 0 | 2 | 0 | 0 |
| 20 | DF | (Montenegro) Momčilo Raspopović | 4 | 1 | 1 | 0 | 0 | 0 | 4 | 1 | 1 |
| 21 | MF | (Lithuania) Paulius Golubickas | 2 | 0 | 0 | 0 | 0 | 0 | 2 | 0 | 0 |
| 22 | DF | (Slovakia) Matúš Vojtko | 4 | 0 | 0 | 0 | 0 | 0 | 4 | 0 | 0 |
| 23 | MF | (Australia) Anthony Kalik | 2 | 0 | 0 | 0 | 0 | 0 | 2 | 0 | 0 |
| 23 | MF | (Croatia) Luka Kapulica | 0 | 0 | 0 | 1 | 0 | 0 | 1 | 0 | 0 |
| 24 | MF | (Croatia) Fran Tomek | 1 | 0 | 0 | 0 | 0 | 0 | 1 | 0 | 0 |
| 25 | DF | (Croatia) Krešimir Krizmanić | 6 | 0 | 0 | 0 | 0 | 0 | 6 | 0 | 0 |
| 31 | GK | (Croatia) Ivan Banić | 4 | 0 | 0 | 0 | 0 | 0 | 4 | 0 | 0 |
| 32 | DF | (Croatia) Slavko Bralić | 4 | 0 | 0 | 0 | 0 | 0 | 4 | 0 | 0 |
| 33 | DF | (Mali) Cheick Keita | 2 | 0 | 0 | 1 | 0 | 0 | 3 | 0 | 0 |
| 44 | DF | (Croatia) Ivan Tomečak | 2 | 0 | 0 | 0 | 0 | 0 | 2 | 0 | 0 |
| 45 | DF | (France) Nathan Cruce-Corcy | 0 | 0 | 0 | 1 | 0 | 0 | 1 | 0 | 0 |
| 46 | FW | (Montenegro) Nikola Vujnović | 2 | 0 | 0 | 1 | 0 | 0 | 3 | 0 | 0 |
| 77 | DF | (Croatia) Valentino Majstorović | 1 | 0 | 0 | 0 | 0 | 0 | 1 | 0 | 0 |
| 90 | DF | (Croatia) Dino Štiglec | 2 | 0 | 0 | 0 | 0 | 0 | 2 | 0 | 0 |
| 95 | FW | (Croatia) Vinko Petković | 1 | 0 | 0 | 0 | 0 | 0 | 1 | 0 | 0 |
| 99 | MF | (Republic of the Congo) Merveil Ndockyt | 4 | 0 | 0 | 0 | 0 | 0 | 4 | 0 | 0 |
| TOTALS | | | 91 | 4 | 5 | 9 | 0 | 0 | 100 | 4 | 5 |

=== Appearances and goals ===
| Number | Position | Player | Apps | Goals | Apps | Goals | Apps | Goals |
| Number | Position | Player | Total | | HNL (Note: First number represents appearances in starting eleven, while the second number indicates a substitute appearance.) | | Croatian Cup | |
|---|---|---|---|---|---|---|---|---|
| 1 | GK | (Croatia) Karlo Žiger | 1 | 0 | 0+0 | 0 | 1+0 | 0 |
| 3 | DF | (Bosnia and Herzegovina) Aleksandar Jovičić | 16 | 0 | 12+2 | 0 | 2+0 | 0 |
| 4 | DF | (Netherlands) Matthew Steenvoorden | 26 | 2 | 24+1 | 1 | 1+0 | 1 |
| 5 | DF | (Bosnia and Herzegovina) Saša Marjanović | 1 | 0 | 0+0 | 0 | 0+1 | 0 |
| 6 | DF | (United States) Amet Korça | 3 | 0 | 2+0 | 0 | 0+1 | 0 |
| 7 | MF | (Australia) Tyrese Francois | 12 | 1 | 9+1 | 1 | 1+1 | 0 |
| 7 | FW | (Croatia) Ante Matej Jurić | 16 | 0 | 7+8 | 0 | 0+1 | 0 |
| 8 | MF | (Netherlands) Joey Suk | 30 | 2 | 18+12 | 2 | 0+0 | 0 |
| 9 | FW | (Croatia) Kristian Fućak | 17 | 5 | 13+4 | 5 | 0+0 | 0 |
| 9 | FW | (Australia) Deni Jurić | 13 | 1 | 8+3 | 1 | 1+1 | 0 |
| 10 | MF | (Croatia) Jurica Pršir | 36 | 1 | 32+2 | 1 | 2+0 | 0 |
| 11 | MF | (Croatia) Edin Julardžija | 15 | 0 | 2+11 | 0 | 1+1 | 0 |
| 13 | DF | (Croatia) Robert Ćosić | 2 | 0 | 1+1 | 0 | 0+0 | 0 |
| 14 | FW | (Croatia) Josip Mitrović | 31 | 5 | 26+4 | 4 | 1+0 | 1 |
| 15 | MF | (Croatia) Filip Mrzljak | 12 | 0 | 12+0 | 0 | 0+0 | 0 |
| 15 | DF | (Senegal) Moussa Wagué | 14 | 0 | 6+7 | 0 | 1+0 | 0 |
| 16 | MF | (Croatia) Toni Fruk | 24 | 7 | 22+2 | 7 | 0+0 | 0 |
| 17 | MF | (Croatia) Vinko Skrbin | 3 | 0 | 0+3 | 0 | 0+0 | 0 |
| 19 | FW | (Brazil) Caio Da Cruz | 12 | 1 | 3+8 | 1 | 0+1 | 0 |
| 20 | DF | (Montenegro) Momčilo Raspopović | 24 | 1 | 18+5 | 1 | 0+1 | 0 |
| 21 | MF | (Lithuania) Paulius Golubickas | 12 | 0 | 7+4 | 0 | 0+1 | 0 |
| 21 | GK | (Croatia) Božidar Radošević | 10 | 0 | 10+0 | 0 | 0+0 | 0 |
| 22 | DF | (Slovakia) Matúš Vojtko | 26 | 1 | 10+14 | 1 | 2+0 | 0 |
| 23 | MF | (Australia) Anthony Kalik | 4 | 2 | 4+0 | 2 | 0+0 | 0 |
| 23 | MF | (Croatia) Luka Kapulica | 11 | 1 | 4+6 | 1 | 1+0 | 0 |
| 23 | MF | (Austria) Dominik Prokop | 7 | 0 | 3+3 | 0 | 1+0 | 0 |
| 24 | MF | (Croatia) Fran Tomek | 1 | 0 | 0+1 | 0 | 0+0 | 0 |
| 25 | DF | (Croatia) Krešimir Krizmanić | 34 | 0 | 29+4 | 0 | 1+0 | 0 |
| 30 | MF | (Croatia) Luka Brlek | 1 | 0 | 0+0 | 0 | 0+1 | 0 |
| 31 | GK | (Croatia) Ivan Banić | 27 | 0 | 26+0 | 0 | 1+0 | 0 |
| 32 | DF | (Croatia) Slavko Bralić | 18 | 3 | 18+0 | 3 | 0+0 | 0 |
| 33 | DF | (Mali) Cheick Keita | 7 | 0 | 5+1 | 0 | 1+0 | 0 |
| 34 | DF | (Croatia) Mario Matković | 1 | 0 | 0+1 | 0 | 0+0 | 0 |
| 44 | DF | (Croatia) Ivan Tomečak | 17 | 0 | 17+0 | 0 | 0+0 | 0 |
| 45 | DF | (France) Nathan Cruce-Corcy | 1 | 0 | 0+0 | 0 | 1+0 | 0 |
| 46 | FW | (Montenegro) Nikola Vujnović | 21 | 2 | 6+13 | 1 | 2+0 | 1 |
| 71 | MF | (Brazil) Wallace | 5 | 0 | 0+5 | 0 | 0+0 | 0 |
| 77 | FW | (Croatia) Valentino Majstorović | 19 | 0 | 3+16 | 0 | 0+0 | 0 |
| 89 | FW | (Slovenia) Tim Matavž | 15 | 0 | 5+10 | 0 | 0+0 | 0 |
| 90 | DF | (Croatia) Dino Štiglec | 15 | 0 | 10+5 | 0 | 0+0 | 0 |
| 95 | FW | (Croatia) Vinko Petković | 7 | 0 | 3+4 | 0 | 0+0 | 0 |
| 99 | MF | (Republic of the Congo) Merveil Ndockyt | 30 | 3 | 20+9 | 3 | 1+0 | 0 |
