= Karlo Žiger =

Croatian footballer (born 2001)

Personal information
- Full name: Karlo Žiger
- Date of birth: 11 May 2001 (age 25)
- Place of birth: Zagreb, Croatia
- Position: Goalkeeper

Team information
- Current team: Sesvete
- Number: 1

Youth career
- 2008–2017: NK Zagreb
- 2017–2019: Chelsea

Senior career*
Years	Team	Apps	(Gls)
2019–2022	Chelsea	0	(0)
2019	→ Sutton United (loan)	0	(0)
2021–2022	→ Rudar Velenje (loan)	16	(0)
2022–2025	Gorica	2	(0)
2023–2024	→ Sesvete (loan)	28	(0)
2025–	Sesvete	29	(0)
- * Club domestic league appearances and goals as of 16 June 2026

Karlo Žiger (born 11 May 2001) is a Croatian professional footballer who plays as a goalkeeper for Sesvete.

== Career ==
Žiger started his career with English Premier League side Chelsea. Before the second half of 2018–19, he was sent on loan to Sutton United in the English fifth tier. In 2021, Žiger was sent on loan to Slovenian second-tier club Rudar Velenje. In 2022, he signed for Gorica in the Croatian top flight. Ahead of the 2023–24 campaign, Žiger joined Prva NL side, Sesvete on a season-long loan.

== Career statistics ==
As of match played 6 October 2023.

Appearances and goals by club, season and competition
Club	Season	League			National Cup		League Cup		Europe		Other		Total	
Club	Season	Division	Apps	Goals	Apps	Goals	Apps	Goals	Apps	Goals	Apps	Goals	Apps	Goals
Chelsea	2018–19	Premier League	0	0	0	0	0	0	0	0	0	0	0	0
Chelsea	2019–20	Premier League	0	0	0	0	0	0	0	0	0	0	0	0
Chelsea	2020–21	Premier League	0	0	0	0	0	0	0	0	—		0	0
Chelsea	2021–22	Premier League	0	0	0	0	0	0	0	0	0	0	0	0
Chelsea	Total		0	0	0	0	0	0	0	0	0	0	0	0
Chelsea U23	2020–21	—			—		—		—		1 (Note: Appearance in the EFL Trophy)	0	1	0
Sutton United (loan)	2018–19	National League	0	0	—		—		—		1 (Note: Appearance in the FA Trophy)	0	1	0
Rudar Velenje (loan)	2021–22	2. SNL	16	0	—		—		—		—		16	0
Gorica	2022–23	Prva HNL	0	0	1	0	—		—		—		1	0
Gorica	2023–24	Prva HNL	0	0	0	0	—		—		—		0	0
Gorica	Total		0	0	1	0	—		—		—		1	0
Sesvete (loan)	2023–24	Prva NL	8	0	0	0	—		—		—		8	0
Career total			24	0	1	0	0	0	0	0	2	0	27	0
