= Tyrese Francois =

Australian soccer player

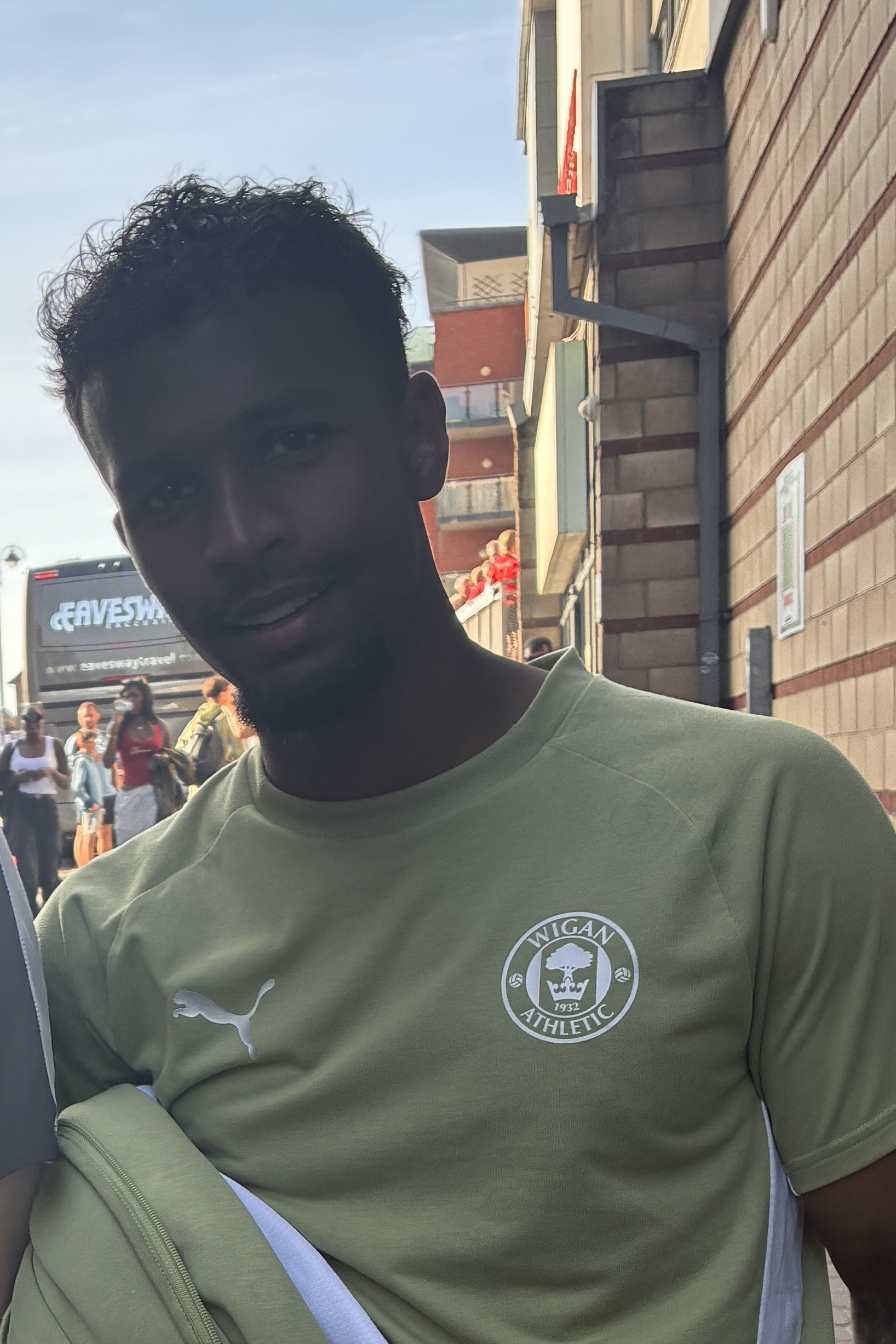
- Tyrese Francois with Wigan Athletic in 2025.

Personal information
- Full name: Tyrese Jay Francois
- Date of birth: 16 July 2000 (age 26)
- Place of birth: Campbelltown, New South Wales, Australia
- Height: 1.73 m (5 ft 8 in)
- Position: Defensive midfielder

Team information
- Current team: Brisbane Roar
- Number: 8

Youth career
- Campbelltown Uniting Church SC
- Camden Tigers
- 2013–2019: Fulham

Senior career*
Years	Team	Apps	(Gls)
2019–2024	Fulham	4	(0)
2022–2023	→ HNK Gorica (loan)	10	(1)
2024	→ Vejle (loan)	15	(0)
2024–2026	Wigan Athletic	18	(0)
2026–	Brisbane Roar	1	(0)

International career
2021–2022	Australia U23	8	(0)
- * Club domestic league appearances and goals as of 24 October 2026

Tyrese Jay Francois (born 16 July 2000) is an Australian professional soccer player who plays as a central or defensive midfielder for A-League Men club Brisbane Roar.

== Early life ==
Tyrese Jay Francois was born in Campbelltown, New South Wales, to a Mauritian father and an English Mauritian mother. He joined Campbelltown Uniting Church Soccer Club at the age of five, and later moved to Camden Tigers. Alongside football, he also played rugby league at junior level, playing at fullback. While in Australia, Francois trained under Andrea Icardi at the AC Milan Academy Australia. In 2013, his family moved to London, England, where he and his brother Marlee Francois signed for Fulham Academy.

== Club career ==
On 27 August 2019, Francois made his professional debut for Fulham in an EFL Cup tie against Southampton. On 1 September 2022 Francois joined Croatian team HNK Gorica on a season long loan from Fulham. He played his first game coming off the bench on 3 September in a 2–1 defeat to NK Varaždin.

On 1 February 2024, it was confirmed that Francois had been loaned to Danish Superliga side Vejle Boldklub until 30 June 2024. After completing his loan, Francois departed Fulham at the end of his contract. On 19 July 2024, Francois signed for Wigan Athletic, penning a two-year contract.

On 6 May 2026 the club announced the player would be leaving in the summer when his contract expired.

On 28 August 2026, Francois returned to his homeland after signing a multi-year deal with Brisbane Roar.

== International career ==
Francois was called up to the senior Australia squad for two friendly matches against New Zealand in September 2022. He was an unused substitute for the match on 25 September 2022 in Auckland.

== Personal life ==
Francois supports Wests Tigers.

== Career statistics ==
As of match played on 24 October 2026

Appearances and goals by club, season and competition
Club	Season	League			National cup (Note: Includes FA Cup)		League cup (Note: Includes EFL Cup)		Other		Total	
Club	Season	Division	Apps	Goals	Apps	Goals	Apps	Goals	Apps	Goals	Apps	Goals
Fulham U21	2018–19	—			—		—		3 (Note: Appearance(s) in EFL Trophy)	0	3	0
Fulham U21	2019–20	—			—		—		1	0	1	0
Fulham U21	2020–21	—			—		—		1	0	1	0
Fulham U21	2023–24	—			—		—		1	0	1	0
Fulham U21	Total		—		—		—		6	0	6	0
Fulham	2019–20	Championship	0	0	0	0	1	0	—		1	0
Fulham	2020–21	Premier League	1	0	0	0	1	0	—		2	0
Fulham	2021–22	Championship	2	0	1	0	1	0	—		4	0
Fulham	2022–23	Premier League	1	0	0	0	1	0	—		2	0
Fulham	2023–24	Premier League	0	0	1	0	1	0	—		2	0
Fulham	Total		4	0	2	0	5	0	—		11	0
Gorica (loan)	2022–23	Prva HNL	10	1	2	0	—		—		12	1
Vejle (loan)	2023–24	Danish Superliga	15	0	0	0	—		—		15	0
Wigan Athletic	2024–25	EFL League One	5	0	1	0	0	0	1	0	7	0
Wigan Athletic	2025–26	EFL League One	13	0	1	0	0	0	0	0	14	0
Wigan Athletic	Total		18	0	2	0	0	0	1	0	21	0
Brisbane Roar	2026–27	A-League Men	1	0	0	0	—		—		1	0
Career total			48	1	4	0	5	0	7	0	64	1
