= Kristian Fućak =

Croatian footballer

Personal information
- Date of birth: 14 November 1998 (age 27)
- Place of birth: Rijeka, Croatia
- Height: 1.93 m (6 ft 4 in)
- Position: Forward

Team information
- Current team: Miedź Legnica
- Number: 9

Youth career
- –2016: Grobničan

Senior career*
Years	Team	Apps	(Gls)
2016–2019	Grobničan	73	(18)
2019–2020	Varaždin	13	(1)
2020	→ Orijent (loan)	3	(1)
2020–2021	Grobničan	7	(2)
2021–2022	Orijent	28	(10)
2022–2025	Osijek	23	(1)
2023	→ Gorica (loan)	17	(5)
2024–2025	→ Zalaegerszeg (loan)	7	(0)
2025	Istra 1961	16	(1)
2025–2026	Stal Mielec	18	(4)
2026–	Miedź Legnica	0	(0)
- * Club domestic league appearances and goals as of 15:01, 30 May 2026 (UTC)

Kristian Fućak (born 14 November 1998) is a Croatian professional footballer who plays as a forward for I liga club Miedź Legnica.

== Club career ==
Fućak started his senior career at Grobničan. After impressing on trial, he signed for then second-league side, Varaždin. On 20 July 2019, Fućak made his Prva HNL debut with Varaždin in a match against Rijeka, coming in for Dominik Glavina in the 84th minute.

After impressing at Orijent, Fućak drew interest from Rijeka and Osijek, ultimately signing for the latter for a reported €100,000 plus bonuses on 19 January 2022 . On 19 January 2023. Osijek loaned Fućak, along with teammates Slavko Bralić and Vinko Petković to Gorica until the end of the season. While at loan in Gorica, Fućak scored five goals, including two against his own club Osijek, and assisted two goals. Shortly after returning to Osijek upon the expiration of his loan at Gorica, he tore his ACL during a match against Adana Demirspor. Fućak entered the game in Adana in the 71st minute, and was injured shortly after stepping onto the field. Despite the injury, he played ten more minutes until the end of the game.
