= Wallace (footballer, born 1998) =

Brazilian footballer

Personal information
- Full name: Wallace Menezes dos Santos
- Date of birth: 23 June 1998 (age 28)
- Height: 1.79 m (5 ft 10 in)
- Position: Midfielder

Team information
- Current team: Velež Mostar
- Number: 70

Youth career
- –2017: Sergipe
- 2016: → Fluminense (youth loan)
- 2017: → Grêmio (youth loan)

Senior career*
Years	Team	Apps	(Gls)
2017–2018	Sergipe	15	(0)
2018	Internacional	0	(0)
2019	Maruinense		
2020–2022	Austria Lustenau	64	(11)
2021–2022	Austria Lustenau II	2	(1)
2022	Gorica	5	(0)
2023–	Velež Mostar	6	(0)
- * Club domestic league appearances and goals as of 1 May 2023

Wallace Menezes dos Santos (born 23 June 1998), commonly known as Wallace, is a Brazilian professional footballer who plays as a midfielder for Bosnian Premier League club Velež Mostar.

== Career statistics ==
=== Club ===
As of 22 October 2021.

Club	Season	League			State League		Cup		Other		Total	
Club	Season	Division	Apps	Goals	Apps	Goals	Apps	Goals	Apps	Goals	Apps	Goals
Sergipe	2017	Série D	0	0	2 (Note: Appearances in the Campeonato Sergipano)	0	0	0	0	0	2	0
Sergipe	2018	Série D	7	0	6	0	0	0	0	0	13	0
Sergipe	Total		7	0	8	0	0	0	0	0	15	0
Internacional	2018	Série A	0	0	0	0	0	0	0	0	0	0
Austria Lustenau	2019–20	2. Liga	13	1	—		3 (Note: Appearances in the Austrian Cup)	0	0	0	16	1
Austria Lustenau	2020–21	2. Liga	27	7	—		1	0	0	0	28	7
Austria Lustenau	2021–22	2. Liga	24	3	—		2	0	0	0	26	3
Austria Lustenau	Total		64	11	0	0	6	0	0	0	70	11
Austria Lustenau II	2021–22	Austrian Regionalliga	2	1	—		—		0	0	2	1
Gorica	2022–23	Croatian Football League	5	0	—		—		0	0	5	0
Career total			78	11	8	0	6	0	0	0	92	10
