= Dino Mikanović =

Croatian footballer (born 1994)

Personal information
- Date of birth: 7 May 1994 (age 32)
- Place of birth: Nova Gradiška, Croatia
- Height: 1.74 m (5 ft 9 in)
- Position: Right-back

Team information
- Current team: Universitatea Cluj
- Number: 24

Youth career
- –2009: Mladost Cernik
- 2009–2012: Osijek
- 2012–2013: Hajduk Split

Senior career*
Years	Team	Apps	(Gls)
2013–2015	Hajduk Split	24	(1)
2014	Hajduk Split II	3	(0)
2015–2019	AGF	99	(0)
2019–2022	Kairat	70	(1)
2022–2024	Hajduk Split	52	(2)
2024–2025	Gorica	30	(2)
2025–	Universitatea Cluj	48	(2)

International career
2012	Croatia U18	3	(0)
2012	Croatia U19	1	(0)
2013–2016	Croatia U21	13	(0)
- * Club domestic league appearances and goals as of 7 November 2026

Dino Mikanović (born 7 May 1994) is a Croatian professional footballer who plays as a right-back for Liga I club Universitatea Cluj.

== Club career ==
Born in Nova Gradiška but hailing from the village of Podvrško, Mikanović started his youth career at the nearby Mladost Cernik. He joined the U17 team of NK Osijek in 2009, spending the next three seasons there before moving to Hajduk Split on a free transfer, as he was not offered a contract after he turned 18. For this club has debuted against Slaven Belupo on 10 April 2013.

He made his debut for Hajduk in his one and only appearance in the 2012–13 season, coming on in the 85th minute against Slaven Belupo. The next season Dino was more prominent in the first team at Hajduk, making 16 appearances in all competitions, scoring his first goal in a 1–1 draw against NK Zadar and assisting a further three goals.

On 15 July 2015, he signed on a four-year contract with AGF Aarhus of the Danish Superliga.

On 19 February 2019, Mikanović signed a two-year contract with FC Kairat.

On 28 January 2022, Hajduk Split announced the return of Mikanović, on a contract until the summer of 2024. His contract ended in June 2024 with Hajduk Split and Mikanović not coming to terms about the renewal. During his time with the club, Mikanović won three domestic cups and made 101 appearances in all competitions, scoring three goals and assisting eight.

On 27 July 2024, HNK Gorica announced the free transfer of Mikanović. He signed a two-year contract following his departure from Hajduk Split. He made his league debut on 3 August 2024 in a home game against Varaždin, but was substituted in the 22nd minute following an injury. The game ended as a goalless draw. Mikanović scored his first goal for the club on 30 August 2024 in the 76 minute in a 2–1 league win on home turf against the newly promoted Šibenik side.

== Career statistics ==
As of 7 November 2026

Appearances and goals by club, season and competition
Club	Season	League			National cup (Note: Includes Croatian Cup, Danish Cup, Kazakhstan Cup, Cupa României)		Europe		Other		Total	
Club	Season	Division	Apps	Goals	Apps	Goals	Apps	Goals	Apps	Goals	Apps	Goals
Hajduk Split	2012–13	Prva HNL	1	0	—		—		—		1	0
Hajduk Split	2013–14	Prva HNL	10	1	2	0	4 (Note: Appearance(s) in UEFA Europa League)	0	—		16	1
Hajduk Split	2014–15	Prva HNL	13	0	1	0	1	0	—		15	0
Hajduk Split	2015–16	Prva HNL	—		—		1	0	—		1	0
Hajduk Split	Total		24	1	3	0	6	0	—		33	1
AGF	2015–16	Danish Superliga	19	0	4	1	—		—		23	1
AGF	2016–17	Danish Superliga	29	0	1	0	—		—		30	0
AGF	2017–18	Danish Superliga	31	0	0	0	—		—		31	0
AGF	2018–19	Danish Superliga	20	0	2	0	—		—		22	0
AGF	Total		99	0	7	1	—		—		106	1
Kairat	2019	Kazakhstan Premier League	31	1	0	0	4	0	1 (Note: Appearance in Kazakhstan Super Cup)	0	36	1
Kairat	2020	Kazakhstan Premier League	19	0	0	0	2	0	—		21	0
Kairat	2021	Kazakhstan Premier League	20	0	7	0	12 (Note: Four appearances in UEFA Champions League, one appearance in UEFA Europa League, seven appearances in UEFA Europa Conference League)	0	1	0	40	0
Kairat	Total		70	1	7	0	18	0	2	0	97	1
Hajduk Split	2021–22	Prva HNL	16	1	2	0	—		—		18	1
Hajduk Split	2022–23	Prva HNL	24	1	1	0	4 (Note: Appearances in UEFA Europa Conference League)	0	—		29	1
Hajduk Split	2023–24	Prva HNL	12	0	3	0	2	0	—		17	0
Hajduk Split	Total		52	2	6	0	6	0	—		64	2
Gorica	2024–25	Prva HNL	30	2	2	0	—		—		32	2
Universitatea Cluj	2025–26	Liga I	34	2	6	0	—		—		40	2
Universitatea Cluj	2026–27	Liga I	14	0	2	0	2	0	0	0	18	0
Universitatea Cluj	Total		48	2	8	0	2	0	0	0	58	2
Career total			297	8	33	1	32	0	2	0	362	9

== Honours ==
Hajduk Split

- Croatian Cup: 2012–13, 2021–22, 2022–23

Hajduk Split

- Danish Cup runner-up: 2015–16

Kairat

- Kazakhstan Premier League: 2020
- Kazakhstan Cup: 2021

Universitatea Cluj

- Cupa României runner-up: 2025–26
- Supercupa României runner-up: 2026
