= Edin Julardžija =

Croatian footballer

Personal information
- Date of birth: 21 January 2001 (age 25)
- Place of birth: Zagreb, Croatia
- Height: 1.73 m (5 ft 8 in)
- Position: Midfielder

Team information
- Current team: Košice
- Number: 10

Youth career
- 2007–2019: Dinamo Zagreb

Senior career*
Years	Team	Apps	(Gls)
2019–2020	Dinamo Zagreb II	18	(3)
2020–2022	Dinamo Zagreb	2	(0)
2021	→ Slaven Belupo (loan)	8	(0)
2021–2022	→ Šibenik (loan)	10	(0)
2022–2023	Gorica	13	(0)
2023	Domžale	3	(1)
2023–2025	Sarajevo	32	(1)
2024–2025	→ Mura (loan)	23	(0)
2026–	Košice	9	(0)

International career
2015	Croatia U14	2	(0)
2016–2017	Croatia U16	5	(0)
2017–2018	Croatia U17	2	(0)
2019	Croatia U18	4	(0)
2020	Croatia U19	2	(0)
2021	Croatia U20	2	(0)
- * Club domestic league appearances and goals as of 25 May 2026

Edin Julardžija (born 21 January 2001) is a Croatian professional footballer who plays as a midfielder for Slovak First Football League club Košice.

== Club career ==
Julardžija was born in the Zagreb neighbourhood of Ferenščica. His father Dino, who hails from Bešpelj near Jajce, Bosnia and Herzegovina, was a coach at Dinamo Zagreb academy, which Edin joined when he was six years old. He started attracting attention of prominent European clubs such as Chelsea (whose offer his family refused in 2014), Milan, Fiorentina, Lazio and Valencia.

Julardžija made his senior debut for Dinamo Zagreb on 17 November 2018, in a friendly against Široki Brijeg. He was a key part of Dinamo's 2019–20 UEFA Youth League campaign, notably scoring a Panenka in a penalty shoot-out in the round of 16 against Bayern Munich. On 1 April 2020, he signed a professional contract with Dinamo. On 18 July 2020, he made his competitive senior debut in a 0–0 draw with Istra 1961, replacing Lovro Majer in the 85th minute. On 30 November 2020, Julardžija was named amongst twenty best players of the Youth League by UEFA, alongside teammate Bernard Karrica.

In February 2021, Julardžija was loaned out to Slaven Belupo, to replace his Dinamo teammate Niko Janković whose loan deal got terminated by Slaven due to injury. In July, he was sent on another loan, this time to Šibenik.

Julardžija signed a four-year contract with Gorica in the summer of 2022.

On 12 January 2026, it was announced that Julardžija would be joining Slovak club FC Košice, becoming their first signing of the winter transfer window.

== International career ==
Eligible to represent Croatia and Bosnia and Herzegovina internationally, Julardžija opted for the former.

== Career statistics ==
As of match played 28 October 2025

Appearances and goals by club, season and competition
Club	Season	League			National cup (Note: Includes Croatian Cup, Slovenian Cup, Bosnia and Herzegovina Cup)		Continental		Total	
Club	Season	Division	Apps	Goals	Apps	Goals	Apps	Goals	Apps	Goals
Dinamo Zagreb II	2018–19	Croatian Second League	1	0	—		—		1	0
Dinamo Zagreb II	2020–21	Croatian Second League	17	3	—		—		17	3
Dinamo Zagreb II	Total		18	3	—		—		18	3
Dinamo Zagreb	2019–20	Croatian First League	2	0	0	0	0	0	2	0
Slaven Belupo (loan)	2020–21	Croatian First League	8	0	1	0	—		9	0
Šibenik (loan)	2021–22	Croatian First League	10	0	0	0	—		10	0
Gorica	2022–23	Croatian League	13	0	2	0	—		15	0
Domžale	2023–24	Slovenian PrvaLiga	3	1	0	0	2 (Note: Appearance(s) in UEFA Europa Conference League)	0	5	1
Sarajevo	2023–24	Bosnian Premier League	27	1	3	0	—		30	1
Sarajevo	2024–25	Bosnian Premier League	3	0	—		4	0	7	0
Sarajevo	2025–26	Bosnian Premier League	2	0	1	0	—		3	0
Sarajevo	Total		32	1	4	0	4	0	40	1
Mura (loan)	2024–25	Slovenian PrvaLiga	23	0	1	0	—		24	0
Career total			109	5	8	0	6	0	123	5

== Honours ==
Dinamo Zagreb

- Prva HNL: 2019–20
