= Gabriel Rukavina =

Croatian footballer

Personal information
- Date of birth: 16 January 2004 (age 22)
- Place of birth: Zagreb, Croatia
- Height: 1.80 m (5 ft 11 in)
- Position: Forward

Team information
- Current team: Arouca
- Number: 20

Youth career
- –2021: Dinamo Zagreb

Senior career*
Years	Team	Apps	(Gls)
2020–2022	Dinamo Zagreb II	27	(4)
2022–2024	Dinamo Zagreb	8	(0)
2024	→ Gorica (loan)	15	(2)
2024–2026	Rijeka	46	(3)
2026–	Arouca	0	(0)

International career^{‡}
2020	Croatia U16	2	(0)
2020–2021	Croatia U17	6	(0)
2021–2022	Croatia U18	7	(2)
2021–2023	Croatia U19	18	(4)
2025	Croatia U21	4	(0)
- * Club domestic league appearances and goals as of 4 September 2026 ‡ National team caps and goals as of 6 June 2025

Gabriel Rukavina is a Croatian professional footballer who plays as a forward for Portuguese club Arouca.

== Early and personal life ==
Rukavina was born in the Croatian capital Zagreb in January 2004. He is the son of former professional footballer and current manager Tomislav Rukavina.

== Club career ==
Rukavina played for Dinamo Zagreb from a young age, and made his professional debut for the club's B team, coming on as a substitute in the 72nd minute, in a 1–1 draw against Osijek II, in the Prva NL. Rukavina scored his first goal in a 2–2 draw away to Craoatia Zmijavci, after coming on at half-time for Ante Crnac. Rukavina would go on to make 27 appearances in the league, registering 4 goals, including a brace against Dugopolje in a 3–1 win,

Rukavina would be promoted to the first team the next season, and would make his first team debut in a 3–1 away win against NK Varaždin, coming on as a 89th minute sub for Luka Ivanušec. He would go on to make 5 more substitute appearances that season, helping the side to the 2022–23 Prva HNL title.

On 9 February 2024, Rukavina joined Gorica on loan until the end of the season.

Rukavina joined fellow Prva HNL club HNK Rijeka in July 2024, signing a four-year contract with the club. Rijeka won the league title in Rukavina's first season at the club, with Rukavina scoring 3 league goals in 31 appearances as Rijeka beat out his old side Dinamo Zagreb on the final day, eventually winning the league due to their superior head-to-head record against Dinamo.

== International career ==
Rukavina has competed for Croatia's U16, U17, U18 and U19 teams, amassing over 20 appearances.

== Career statistics ==
=== Club ===
As of match played 23 May 2026

Appearances and goals by club, season and competition
Club	Season	League			National cup		Continental		Other		Total	
Club	Season	Division	Apps	Goals	Apps	Goals	Apps	Goals	Apps	Goals	Apps	Goals
Dinamo Zagreb II	2021–22	Druga HNL	27	4	0	0	—		—		27	4
Dinamo Zagreb II	Total		27	4	0	0	0	0	0	0	27	4
Dinamo Zagreb	2022–23	Prva HNL	6	0	0	0	0	0	0	0	6	0
Dinamo Zagreb	2023–24	Prva HNL	2	0	1	0	2 (Note: 2 appearances in UEFA Europa Conference League)	0	0	0	5	0
Dinamo Zagreb	Total		8	0	1	0	2	0	0	0	11	0
Gorica (loan)	2023–24	Prva HNL	15	2	1	0	0	0	0	0	16	2
Rijeka	2024–25	Prva HNL	31	3	6	0	3 (Note: 2 appearances in UEFA Europa League; 1 appearance in UEFA Conference League)	0	0	0	40	3
Rijeka	2025–26	Prva HNL	13	0	2	1	3 (Note: 2 appearances in UEFA Champions League; 1 appearance in UEFA Conference League)	0	0	0	18	1
Rijeka	2026–27	Prva HNL	2	0	0	0	2 (Note: 2 appearances in UEFA Conference League)	0	0	0	4	0
Rijeka	Total		46	3	8	1	8	0	0	0	62	4
Career total			96	9	10	1	10	0	0	0	116	10

== Honours ==
Club

Dinamo Zagreb

- Croatian Football League:2022–23
- Croatian Super Cup:2023

Rijeka

- Croatian Football League: 2024–25
- Croatian Football Cup: 2024–25
