= Medin Gashi =

Kosovan footballer (born 2006)

Personal information
- Date of birth: 1 February 2006 (age 20)
- Place of birth: Pristina, Kosovo
- Height: 1.76 m (5 ft 9 in)
- Position: Forward

Team information
- Current team: Kustošija (on loan from Gorica)
- Number: 9, 99

Youth career
- –2022: Forca Vushtrri
- 2022–2024: Vushtrria
- 2024: Gorica

Senior career*
Years	Team	Apps	(Gls)
2024–	Gorica	29	(1)
2025–	→ Kustošija (loan)	11	(4)

International career^{‡}
2022	Kosovo U17	3	(0)
2024	Kosovo U19	2	(1)
2025–	Kosovo U21	5	(3)
- * Club domestic league appearances and goals as of 20 September 2026 ‡ National team caps and goals as of 6 October 2026

Medin Gashi (born 1 February 2006) is a Kosovan professional footballer who plays as a forward for Croatian First League club Kustošija, on co-operation loan from Croatian League club Gorica.

== Club career ==
Gashi began playing football at the Forca football school in Vushtrri. In January 2022, he joined Vushtrria alongside fellow young player Amsal Krasniqi.

In August 2024, Gashi joined Croatian club Gorica, signing a three-year contract that ran until 2027. He was initially assigned to the club's junior team. During his first weeks at the club, Gashi attracted attention with his scoring in friendly matches. He scored seven goals across his first two appearances for Gorica, including four goals in the opening 15 minutes of a match against Lučko.

Gashi subsequently featured for Gorica's senior team in the Croatian League. On 13 December 2024, he scored the opening goal in the eighth minute of a match against Slaven Belupo. Gorica lost 2–1, and Gashi was substituted in the 63rd minute. It was his first league goal of the 2024–25 season.

On 29 October 2025, Gashi scored in the 92nd minute of Gorica's 6–0 away victory against Rudeš in the Croatian Cup. The result secured Gorica's place in the quarter-finals of the competition.

== International career ==
Since 2022, Gashi is part of Kosovo at youth international level, respectively representing the U17, U19 and U21 teams and he with these teams played ten matches and scored four goals.
