= Sven Blummel =

Dutch footballer (born 1996)

Personal information
- Full name: Sven Johannes Gerardus Blummel
- Date of birth: 8 September 1996 (age 30)
- Place of birth: Schijndel, Netherlands
- Height: 1.78 m (5 ft 10 in)
- Position: Winger

Youth career
- 2001–2004: RKSV Schijndel
- 2004–2010: PSV
- 2010–2015: RKSV Schijndel

Senior career*
Years	Team	Apps	(Gls)
2015–2017	Jong PSV	16	(1)
2017–2019	FC Den Bosch	72	(23)
2019–2020	Fremad Amager	14	(2)
2020–2021	De Graafschap	8	(0)
2021	→ MVV (loan)	17	(4)
2021–2023	MVV	73	(13)
2023–2024	Gorica	19	(3)
2024–2026	Eindhoven	67	(12)
- * Club domestic league appearances and goals as of 28 April 2026

Sven Johannes Gerardus Blummel (born 8 September 1996) is a Dutch professional footballer who plays as a winger.

== Club career ==
=== Early years ===
Blummel started playing youth football for hometown club RKSV Schijndel before joining the PSV youth academy in 2004. He returned to Schijndel in 2010 and progressed through various youth levels, before again moving to PSV to join their reserve team, Jong PSV, competing in the second-tier Eerste Divisie in 2015. He made his professional debut in the Eerste Divisie on 18 September 2015, replacing Suently Alberto in the 62nd minute of a 3–0 home loss to Sparta Rotterdam.

=== FC Den Bosch ===
In May 2017, Blummel joined FC Den Bosch on a two-year contract with an option for an additional season.

=== Fremad Amager ===
On 12 August 2019, Blummel joined Danish 1st Division club Fremad Amager. He made his debut for Fremad on 16 August in a 3–2 league loss at home against Nykøbing. On 25 August, he scored his first goal for the club, opening the score in an eventual 3–1 away loss in the league to HB Køge. Blummel made 15 appearances for Fremad, scoring twice, before returning to the Netherlands.

=== De Graafschap ===
Blummed returned to the Netherlands after four months in Denmark, joining Eerste Divisie club De Graafschap on a two-and-a-half-year deal on 31 December 2019. He made his debut for the club on 10 January 2020, replacing the injured Mohamed Hamdaoui in the 31st minute of a 2–1 home win over Jong FC Utrecht.

=== MVV ===
On 29 January 2021, he joined MVV. According to the conditions of the transfer, he was loaned until the end of the 2020–21 season, and then transferred permanently on a contract until 2023.

=== Gorica ===
On 1 July 2023, Blummel signed a two-year contract with Croatian Football League club Gorica, after his contract with MVV had expired the previous day.

== Career statistics ==
As of match played 27 May 2023

Appearances and goals by club, season and competition
Club	Season	League			National cup (Note: Includes KNVB Cup, Danish Cup)		Other		Total	
Club	Season	Division	Apps	Goals	Apps	Goals	Apps	Goals	Apps	Goals
Jong PSV	2015–16	Eerste Divisie	10	1	—		—		10	1
Jong PSV	2016–17	Eerste Divisie	6	0	—		—		6	0
Jong PSV	Total		16	1	—		—		16	1
FC Den Bosch	2017–18	Eerste Divisie	38	13	2	2	—		40	15
FC Den Bosch	2018–19	Eerste Divisie	34	10	1	0	2 (Note: Appearances in Eerste Divisie playoffs)	0	37	10
FC Den Bosch	Total		72	23	3	2	2	0	77	25
Fremad Amager	2019–20	Danish 1st Division	14	2	1	0	—		15	2
De Graafschap	2019–20	Eerste Divisie	6	0	0	0	—		6	0
De Graafschap	2020–21	Eerste Divisie	2	0	0	0	0	0	2	0
De Graafschap	Total		8	0	0	0	0	0	8	0
MVV (loan)	2020–21	Eerste Divisie	17	4	0	0	—		17	4
MVV	2021–22	Eerste Divisie	36	8	2	0	—		38	8
MVV	2022–23	Eerste Divisie	37	5	1	0	2	0	40	5
MVV	Total		90	17	3	0	2	0	95	17
Gorica	2023–24	Croatian Football League	0	0	0	0	—		0	0
Career total			200	43	7	2	4	0	211	45
