= Mateo Leš =

Croatian footballer

Personal information
- Date of birth: 25 March 2000 (age 26)
- Place of birth: Virovitica, Croatia
- Height: 1.89 m (6 ft 2 in)
- Position: Defender

Team information
- Current team: HNK Gorica
- Number: 5

Youth career
- NK Virovitica
- 2015–2020: Dinamo Zagreb

Senior career*
Years	Team	Apps	(Gls)
2019–2020	Dinamo Zagreb II	3	(0)
2020–2023	Heracles Almelo	23	(1)
2023–	HNK Gorica	74	(0)

International career
2016–2017	Croatia U17	4	(0)
2017	Croatia U18	1	(0)
- * Club domestic league appearances and goals as of 15 June 2026

Mateo Leš (born 25 March 2000) is a Croatian professional footballer who plays as a defender for HNK Gorica.

== Club career ==
A youth product of Dinamo Zagreb, Leš signed with Heracles Almelo in the Eredivisie in September 2020. He made his professional debut with Heracles Almelo in a 4–0 Eredivisie win over FC Emmen on 12 January 2021.

On 5 July 2023, Leš left Heracles for HNK Gorica.
