= Nikola Vujnović =

Montenegrin footballer

Personal information
- Date of birth: 11 January 1997 (age 29)
- Place of birth: Cetinje, FR Yugoslavia
- Height: 1.77 m (5 ft 10 in)
- Position: Striker

Team information
- Current team: Mornar
- Number: 97

Senior career*
Years	Team	Apps	(Gls)
2012–2014	Radnički Obrenovac	20	(4)
2014	→ Rad (loan)	1	(0)
2015–2018	Villarreal C	46	(9)
2018–2019	Villarreal B	18	(3)
2019–2020	Podgorica	31	(7)
2020–2022	Voždovac	43	(15)
2022	→ Sporting Kansas City (loan)	9	(0)
2022–2024	Gorica	46	(5)
2024	Sumgayit	13	(2)
2025	Partizani Tirana	6	(0)
2025	Jedinstvo Ub	9	(2)
2026–	Mornar	13	(0)

International career^{‡}
2012–2013	Montenegro U17	3	(1)
2014–2015	Montenegro U19	6	(6)
2014–2018	Montenegro U21	9	(0)
2020–	Montenegro	5	(1)
- * Club domestic league appearances and goals as of 17 June 2026 ‡ National team caps and goals as of 7 December 2021

Nikola Vujnović (Serbian Cyrillic: Никола Вујновић; born 11 January 1997) is a Montenegrin professional footballer who plays as a forward for Mornar.

== Club career ==
=== Villarreal ===
Vujnović joined Spanish club Villarreal in the summer of 2015. He initially played in Villarreal's C team in his first few seasons at the club. However, he was eventually promoted to Villarreal B. He featured in Villarreal B's 2018–19 Premier League International Cup campaign, scoring a penalty in a 7–0 win against Liverpool's reserves on 21 November 2018.

=== Podgorica ===
On 30 July 2019, Vujnović signed a one-year contract with Montenegrin club Podgorica. He scored a total of seven goals over the course of the 2019–20 season.

=== Voždovac ===
On 29 July 2020, Vujnović joined Voždovac.

=== Sporting Kansas City ===
On 15 February 2022, Vujnović signed with Sporting Kansas City on a season long loan with a purchase option. On 8 July 2022, Vujnović and Kansas City agreed to terminate his loan at the club.

=== Sumgayit ===
On 13 July 2024, Vujnović signed with Sumgayit FK.

== International career ==
He made his national team debut on 7 October 2020 in a friendly against Latvia.

== Career ==
=== International ===
As of match played on 16 November 2021

Montenegro
Year	Apps	Goals
2021	5	1
Total	5	1

As of match played 13 November 2021. Montenegro score listed first, score column indicates score after each of his goal.

No	Date	Venue	Cap	Opponent	Score	Result	Competition
1	13 November 2021	Podgorica City Stadium, Podgorica, Montenegro	3	Netherlands	2–2	2–2	2022 FIFA World Cup qualification
