= Slavko Bralić =

Croatian footballer

Personal information
- Date of birth: 15 December 1992 (age 33)
- Place of birth: Split, Croatia
- Height: 1.91 m (6 ft 3 in)
- Position: Centre back

Youth career
- 2003–2007: Omladinac Vranjic
- 2007: Solin
- 2007–2011: Omladinac Vranjic

Senior career*
Years	Team	Apps	(Gls)
2011–2013	Solin	42	(3)
2013–2015	Osijek	41	(1)
2015–2018	Široki Brijeg	61	(3)
2018	Neftçi Baku	10	(0)
2019	AEL	24	(1)
2020–2021	Vojvodina	37	(1)
2021–2024	Osijek	49	(1)
2023	→ Gorica (loan)	18	(3)
2024–2025	Celje	6	(0)
2025	→ Gorica (loan)	14	(0)
2025–2026	Sarajevo	29	(1)
- * Club domestic league appearances and goals as of 25 May 2026

Slavko Bralić (born 15 December 1992) is a Croatian professional footballer playing as a defender.

== Club career ==
On 15 June 2018, Bralić signed a one-year contract with Neftçi. On 15 January 2019, after 13 games for Neftçi, Bralić was demoted to Neftçi-2 after being told to find a new club. Bralić was released from his Neftçi contract on 30 January 2019 by mutual consent. On January 31, 2019, Bralic signed a 2.5-year contract with Greek Super League club AEL After half a season in Greece, on February 7, 2020, Bralic signed a 1.5-year contract with Serbian SuperLiga club Vojvodina from Novi Sad. On 1 June 2021, Bralic signed a 3-year contract with Croatian First Football League club NK Osijek. On 20 July 2025, Bralić signed a one-year contract with Sarajevo.

== Career statistics ==
=== Club ===
As of match played 25 May 2026

Appearances and goals by club, season and competition
Club	Season	League			National cup (Note: Includes Croatian Cup, Bosnian Cup, Azerbaijan Cup, Greek Cup, Serbian Cup, Slovenian Cup)		Continental		Other		Total	
Club	Season	Division	Apps	Goals	Apps	Goals	Apps	Goals	Apps	Goals	Apps	Goals
Solin	2011–12	2. HNL	14	1	0	0	—		—		14	1
Solin	2012–13	2. HNL	28	2	0	0	—		—		28	2
Solin	Total		42	3	0	0	—		—		42	3
Osijek	2013–14	HNL	24	1	4	0	—		—		28	1
Osijek	2014–15	HNL	17	0	2	0	—		—		19	0
Osijek	Total		41	1	6	0	—		—		47	1
Široki Brijeg	2015–16	Bosnian Premier League	20	1	3	0	—		—		23	1
Široki Brijeg	2016–17	Bosnian Premier League	23	1	8	0	0	0	—		31	1
Široki Brijeg	2017–18	Bosnian Premier League	28	1	4	0	4 (Note: Appearance(s) in UEFA Europa League)	0	—		36	1
Široki Brijeg	Total		71	3	15	0	4	0	—		90	3
Neftçi Baku	2018–19	Azerbaijan Premier League	10	0	1	0	2	0	—		13	0
AEL	2018–19	Super League Greece	8	1	—		—		—		8	1
AEL	2019–20	Super League Greece	16	0	0	0	—		—		16	0
AEL	Total		24	1	0	0	—		—		24	1
Vojvodina	2019–20	Serbian SuperLiga	7	0	3	0	—		—		10	0
Vojvodina	2020–21	Serbian SuperLiga	30	1	3	0	1	0	—		34	1
Vojvodina	Total		37	1	6	0	1	0	—		44	1
Osijek	2021–22	HNL	16	0	1	0	0	0	—		17	0
Osijek	2022–23	HNL	7	0	0	0	1 (Note: Appearance(s) in UEFA Europa Conference League)	0	—		8	0
Osijek	2023–24	HNL	26	1	2	1	0	0	—		28	2
Osijek	Total		49	1	3	1	1	0	—		53	2
Gorica (loan)	2022–23	HNL	18	3	—		—		—		18	3
Celje	2024–25	Slovenian PrvaLiga	6	0	1	1	1	0	—		8	1
Gorica (loan)	2024–25	HNL	14	0	1	0	—		—		15	0
Sarajevo	2025–26	Bosnian Premier League	29	1	1	0	1	0	1 (Note: Appearance in Bosnian Supercup)	0	32	1
Career total			341	14	34	2	10	0	1	0	376	16

== Honours ==
=== Club ===
Široki Brijeg

- Bosnian Cup: 2016–17

Vojvodina

- Serbian Cup: 2019–20

Celje

- Slovenian Cup: 2024–25
