= 2021–22 NK Slaven Belupo season =

NK Slaven Belupo
2021–22 season
- Chairman: Hrvoje Kolarić
- Manager: Zoran Zekić
- Stadium: Gradski stadion Ivan Kušek-Apaš
- Prva HNL: 7th
- Croatian Cup: Quarter-finals
Home colours	Away colours	Third colours

The 2021–22 season is the 113th season in the existence of NK Slaven Belupo and the 14th consecutive season in the top flight of Croatian football. In addition to the domestic league, NK Slaven Belupo participated in this season's edition of the Croatian Cup.

== Players ==
=== First-team squad ===
As of 9 March 2022

Note: Flags indicate national team as defined under FIFA eligibility rules; some limited exceptions apply. Players may hold more than one non-FIFA nationality.

No.	Pos.	Nation	Player
1	GK	CRO	Antun Marković
2	DF	CRO	Matko Zirdum
3	DF	NGR	Ikouwem Udo
4	MF	CRO	Mario Marina
6	DF	CRO	Tomislav Božić
7	DF	CRO	Bruno Goda
8	MF	CRO	Mihael Mlinarić
9	FW	KOS	Arbër Hoxha
10	MF	CRO	Lovro Zvonarek (on loan from Bayern Munich)
11	FW	CRO	Ante Crnac
12	GK	CRO	Ivan Čović
13	FW	BRA	Marcos Paulo
14	MF	CRO	Luka Liklin
15	DF	CRO	Goran Paracki

No.	Pos.	Nation	Player
16	DF	BIH	Zoran Kvržić
17	MF	CRO	Mateo Kocijan
18	MF	CRO	Arijan Brković
19	FW	COL	Hansel Zapata (on loan from Sheriff Tiraspol)
20	DF	CRO	Filip Hlevnjak
21	FW	CRO	Marin Laušić
22	DF	CRO	Vinko Soldo
23	MF	CRO	Ivijan Svržnjak (on loan from Dinamo Zagreb II)
24	DF	CRO	Novak Tepšić
25	GK	CRO	Ivan Sušak
26	MF	MDA	Mihail Caimacov
30	FW	CRO	Bruno Bogojević
33	DF	CRO	Antonio Bosec
99	FW	CRO	Ivan Krstanović

=== Out on loan ===
As of 9 February 2022

Note: Flags indicate national team as defined under FIFA eligibility rules; some limited exceptions apply. Players may hold more than one non-FIFA nationality.

No.	Pos.	Nation	Player
—	DF	CRO	Filip Srpak (at Križevci until 30 June 2022)
—	DF	ARG	Gonzalo Gamarra (at Inter Zaprešić until 30 June 2022)
—	DF	CRO	Romano Lisjak (at Križevci until 30 June 2022)
—	MF	BIH	Nikola Turanjanin (at Dubrava until 30 June 2022)

No.	Pos.	Nation	Player
—	MF	CRO	Tomislav Srbljinović (at Rudeš until 30 June 2022)
—	FW	CRO	Luka Artuković (at Koprivnica until 30 June 2022)
—	FW	CRO	Mateo Monjac (at Tabor Sežana until 30 June 2022)
—	FW	BIH	Nedim Hadžić (at Sloboda Tuzla until 30 June 2022)

== Pre-season and friendlies ==
Win Draw Loss Fixtures

== Competitions ==
=== Overall record ===
Competition	First match	Last match	Starting round	Final position	Record							
Competition	First match	Last match	Starting round	Final position	Pld	W	D	L	GF	GA	GD	Win %
Prva HNL	16 July 2021	21 May 2022	Matchday 1		33	9	7	17	31	48	−17	27.27
Croatian Cup	22 September 2021	1 December 2021	First round	Quarter-finals	3	1	2	0	3	1	+2	33.33
Total					36	10	9	17	34	49	−15	27.78

Last updated: 30 April 2022
Source: Soccerway

=== Prva HNL ===
==== League table ====
Pos	Team	Pld	W	D	L	GF	GA	GD	Pts
5	Lokomotiva	36	12	13	11	55	50	+5	49
6	Gorica	36	12	9	15	43	50	−7	45
7	Slaven Belupo	36	9	9	18	35	54	−19	36
8	Šibenik	36	9	5	22	46	75	−29	32
9	Istra 1961	36	7	10	19	42	67	−25	31

Source: PrvaHNL.hr
Rules for classification: 1) Points; 2) Head-to-head points; 3) Head-to-head goal difference; 4) Head-to-head goals scored (at home if two teams tied); 5) Goal difference; 6) Goals scored; 7) Play-off
(Note: Criteria 2-4 and 7 is only used if deciding champion, teams to international competition or teams for relegation and in that case criteria 6 will not be used).

==== Results summary ====
Overall								Home						Away					
Pld	W	D	L	GF	GA	GD	Pts	W	D	L	GF	GA	GD	W	D	L	GF	GA	GD
4	1	2	1	4	3	+1	5	0	1	1	2	3	−1	1	1	0	2	0	+2

Last updated: 7 August 2021.
Source: Prva HNL

==== Results by round ====
Round	1	2	3	4	5	6	7	8	9	10	11	12	13	14	15	16	17	18	19	20	21	22	23	24	25	26	27	28	29	30	31	32	33	34	35	36
Ground	A	H	A	H	A	A	H	A	H	H	A	H	A	H	H	A	H	A	A	H	A	H	A	A	H	A	H	H	A	H	A	H	H	A	H	A
Result	W	L	D	D	L	L	L	L	D	L	L	L	D	W	L	W	L	W	L	W	W	D	L	W	W	L	D	L	L	L	L	D	W			
Position	4	5	6	6																																

Updated to match(es) played on 30 April 2022. Source: Prva HNL
A = Away; H = Home; W = Win; D = Draw; L = Loss

==== Matches ====
The league fixtures were announced on 8 June 2021.

16 July 2021 1	Dinamo Zagreb	0–2	Slaven Belupo	Zagreb
18:55 CEST (UTC+2)		Report	Marina (yellow card) 27'; Krstanović 50'; Bogojević (yellow card) 83', (goal) 84'; Čović (yellow card) 90+3'	Stadium: Stadion Maksimir; Attendance: 570; Referee: Marin Vidulin

24 July 2021 2	Slaven Belupo	1–2	Lokomotiva	Koprivnica
18:55 CEST (UTC+2)	Krstanović 66' (pen.)	Report	Çokaj 22'; Pivarić 80'	Stadium: Gradski stadion Ivan Kušek Apaš; Attendance: 513; Referee: Dario Bel

1 August 2021 3	Osijek	0–0	Slaven Belupo	Osijek
21:00 CEST (UTC+2)	Bralić (yellow card) 58'	Report	Krstanović (yellow card) 16'; Marina (yellow card) 42'; Van Bruggen (yellow card) 61'; Paracki (yellow card) 89'	Stadium: Gradski Vrt Stadium; Attendance: 1,016; Referee: Igor Pajač

14 August 2021 5	Hajduk Split	2–0	Slaven Belupo	Split
21:00 CEST (UTC+2)	Sahiti 35', (yellow card) 53'; Livaja 48'	Report	Lulić (yellow card) 5'; Bogojević (yellow card) 51'; Goda (yellow card) 81'	Stadium: Stadion Poljud; Attendance: 6,806; Referee: Ivan Bebek

21 August 2021 6	Gorica	1–0	Slaven Belupo	Velika Gorica
18:55 CEST (UTC+2)	Doka (yellow card) 13'; Dvorneković 66'; Krizmanić (yellow card) 80'; Kalik (yellow card) 82'	Report	Marina (yellow card) 64'; Soldo (yellow card) 84'	Stadium: Stadion Radnik; Attendance: 200; Referee: Duje Strukan

11 September 2021 8	Rijeka	2–1	Slaven Belupo	Rijeka
19:05 CEST (UTC+2)	Galović (yellow card) 47'; Issah (yellow card) 54'; Drmić 78', 85'	Report	Caimacov (yellow card) 37'; Bogojević (yellow card) 56'; Hadžić 64'; Paracki (yellow card) 83'	Stadium: Rujevica; Attendance: 2,237; Referee: Duje Strukan

18 September 2021 9	Slaven Belupo	1–1	Istra 1961	Koprivnica
17:00 CEST (UTC+2)	Marina (yellow card) 15'; Krstanović 49' (pen.); Brković (yellow card) 64'; Monjac (yellow card) 90+1'	Report	Mahmoud (yellow card) 14'; Navarro (red card) 37'; Perković 90+4'	Stadium: Gradski stadion Ivan Kušek-Apaš; Attendance: 487; Referee: Zdenko Lovrić

25 September 2021 10	Slaven Belupo	1–4	Dinamo Zagreb	Koprivnica
17:00 CEST (UTC+2)	Goda (yellow card) 14'; Caimacov (yellow card) 34'; Marina (yellow card) 45'; Grgić 80'	Report	Jurić 23'; Oršić 43'; Petković 50'; Čop 76'	Stadium: Gradski stadion Ivan Kušek-Apaš; Attendance: 993; Referee: Dario Kulušić

17 October 2021 12	Slaven Belupo	0–2	Osijek	Koprivnica
15:00 CEST (UTC+2)	Bogojević (yellow card) 36'; Caimacov (yellow card) 37'; Zirdum (yellow card) 78'	Report	Bočkaj (yellow card) 17'; Hiroš 22'; Nejašmić 45'; Škorić (yellow card) 86'	Stadium: Gradski stadion Ivan Kušek Apaš; Attendance: 467; Referee: Duje Strukan

31 October 2021 14	Slaven Belupo	3–2	Hajduk Split	Koprivnica
15:00 CET (UTC+1)	Laušić 2'; Krstanović 34', (yellow card) 87'; Mlinarić 84', (yellow card) 90+5'; Čović (yellow card) 90+6'	Report	Fossati (yellow card) 36'; Katić (yellow card) 45'; Kačaniklić (yellow card) 64'; Livaja 66'; Biuk 86'	Stadium: Gradski Stadion Ivan Kušek Apaš; Attendance: 1,613; Referee: Fran Jović

5 November 2021 15	Slaven Belupo	1–2	Gorica	Koprivnica
18:00 CET (UTC+1)	Zvonarek (yellow card) 15'; Laušić (yellow card) 17', (goal) 43'	Report	Pršir (yellow card) 41'; Kalik 45', 62', (yellow card) 82'; Doka (yellow card) 58'; Jovičić (yellow card) 76'	Stadium: Gradski Stadion Ivan Kušek Apaš; Attendance: 300; Referee: Dario Kulušić

27 November 2021 17	Slaven Belupo	1–2	Rijeka	Koprivnica
17:05 CET (UTC+1)	Caimacov 74'; Hadžić (penalty missed) 86'	Report	Krstanović 51' (o.g.); Drmić 71'; Selahi (yellow card) 73'; Smolčić (yellow card) 85'	Stadium: Gradski stadion Ivan Kušek-Apaš; Attendance: 387; Referee: Zdenko Lovrić

6 December 2021 18	Istra 1961	1–2	Slaven Belupo	Pula
18:00 CET (UTC+1)	Silva (yellow card) 18' (yellow-red card) 66'; Perera (yellow card) 35'; Mišković 51'; Perković (yellow card) 79'	Report	Zapata 20'; Hadžić 31'; Brković (yellow card) 38'; Kocijan (yellow card) 58'; Paracki (yellow card) 72'; Krstanović (yellow card) 79'	Stadium: Stadion Aldo Drosina; Attendance: 374; Referee: Ante Čuljak

12 December 2021 19	Dinamo Zagreb	3–0	Slaven Belupo	Zagreb
17:05 CET (UTC+1)	Andrić 13'; Oršić 19', 25'; Šutalo (yellow card) 39'	Report	Caimacov (yellow card) 10'; Bosec (yellow card) 27'; Zapata (yellow card) 77'	Stadium: Stadion Maksimir; Attendance: 2,049; Referee: Mario Zebec

29 January 2022 21	Osijek	1–2	Slaven Belupo	Osijek
15:00 CET (UTC+1)	Caktaš 74', (yellow card) 90+5'; Leovac (yellow card) 77'	Report	Zvonarek 49'; Božić 68'; Brković (yellow card) 72'; Zapata (yellow card) 90+2'; Crnac (yellow card) 90+5'	Stadium: Gradski Vrt Stadium; Attendance: 2,072; Referee: Duje Strukan

13 February 2022 23	Hajduk Split	3–1	Slaven Belupo	Split
15:00 CET (UTC+1)	Sahiti 13'; Grgić 26'; Livaja 71' (pen.); Katić (yellow card) 78'	Report	Zapata 52'; Bosec (yellow card) 58' (yellow-red card) 62'; Goda (yellow card) 65'	Stadium: Stadion Poljud; Attendance: 9,759; Referee: Ante Čuljak

18 February 2022 24	Gorica	0–3	Slaven Belupo	Velika Gorica
18:00 CET (UTC+1)	Pršir (yellow card) 34'; Jovičić (red card) 56'	Report	Caimacov 2'; Zvonarek 10'; Marina (yellow card) 40', (goal) 56' (pen.)	Stadium: Stadion Radnik; Attendance: 285; Referee: Ivan Bebek

5 March 2022 26	Rijeka	3–0	Slaven Belupo	Rijeka
17:05 CET (UTC+1)	Ampem (yellow card) 43'; Vučkić 55'; Drmić 70'; Gnezda Čerin 79'	Report	Marina (yellow card) 66'; Soldo (yellow card) 70'	Stadium: Rujevica; Attendance: 3,421; Referee: Duje Strukan

12 March 2022 27	Slaven Belupo	0–0	Istra 1961	Koprivnica
15:00 CET (UTC+1)	Marina (yellow card) 5'; Goda (yellow card) 29'; Brković (yellow card) 62'; Bosec (yellow card) 73'; Crnac (yellow card) 90+3'	Report	Hujber (yellow card) 29'; Mlinar (yellow card) 41'; Ivančić (yellow card) 65'; Perera (yellow card) 88'	Stadium: Gradski stadion Ivan Kušek-Apaš; Attendance: 450; Referee: Dario Kulušić

20 March 2022 28	Slaven Belupo	0–1	Dinamo Zagreb	Koprivnica
15:00 CET (UTC+1)	Lausic (yellow card) 9'; Marina (yellow card) 32'; Goda (yellow card) 76'	Report	Oršić 20'; Špikić (yellow card) 58'; Menalo (yellow card) 83'	Stadium: Gradski stadion Ivan Kušek-Apaš; Attendance: 3,013; Referee: Mario Zebec

10 April 2022 30	Slaven Belupo	0–1	Osijek	Koprivnica
17:00 CEST (UTC+2)	Tepšić (yellow card) 60'; Marina (yellow card) 75'; Krstanović (yellow card) 76'	Report	Fiolić (yellow card) 9'; Caktaš 33', (yellow card) 69'	Stadium: Gradski Stadion Ivan Kušek Apaš; Attendance: 669; Referee: Igor Pajač

24 April 2022 32	Slaven Belupo	0–0	Hajduk Split	Koprivnica
17:00 CEST (UTC+2)	Marina (yellow card) 22'; Zvonarek (yellow card) 44'	Report	Katić (yellow card) 11'; Biuk (yellow card) 45'; Fossati (yellow card) 78'; Krovinović (yellow card) 82'; Simić (yellow card) 90+3'	Stadium: Gradski Stadion Ivan Kušek Apaš; Attendance: 3,200; Referee: Fran Jović

30 April 2022 33	Slaven Belupo	2–1	Gorica	Koprivnica
17:00 CEST (UTC+02:00)	Hoxha (yellow card) 37'; Zapata (yellow card) 68'; Krstanović 72'; Kvržić (yellow card) 74'; Božić 81'	Report	Babec 19'; Šimunović (yellow card) 30'; Mitrović (yellow card) 70'; Stojanovski (yellow card) 72'; Kalik (yellow card) 74'	Stadium: Gradski stadion Attendance: 505; Referee: Marin Vidulin

14 May 2022 35	Slaven Belupo	2–2	Rijeka	Koprivnica
17:00 CEST (UTC+2)	Bosec (yellow card) 27'; Krstanović (yellow card) 41', (goal) 56' (pen.), 59'; Marina (yellow card) 49'; Crnac (yellow card) 73'	Report	Gnezda Čerin (yellow card) 3'; Obregón 49'; Vukčević 79'	Stadium: Gradski Stadion Ivan Kušek Apaš; Attendance: 576; Referee: Jakov Titlić

20 May 2022 36	Istra 1961	3–1	Slaven Belupo	Pula
18:00 CEST (UTC+2)	Blagojević (yellow card) 18' (yellow-red card) 71'; Galilea (yellow card) 45+1'; Beljo 48' (pen.), 90+4'; Bandé 54'	Report	Liklin (yellow card) 35'; Bosec (yellow card) 67'; Zvonarek 76'	Stadium: Stadion Aldo Drosina; Attendance: 559; Referee: Fran Jović
