= 2021–22 NK Istra 1961 season =

NK Istra 1961
2021–22 season
- Owner: Baskonia - Alavés Group
- Manager: Danijel Jumić (until 11 June 2021); Gonzalo García (since 11 June 2021)
- Stadium: Stadion Aldo Drosina
- Prva HNL: 9th
- Croatian Cup: Quarter-finals
- Top goalscorer: League: Dion Drena Beljo (15); All: Dion Drena Beljo (20)
- Highest home attendance: 3,981 v Hajduk Split (6 March 2022)
- Lowest home attendance: 261 v Lokomotiva Zagreb (1 November 2021)
- Average home league attendance: 940

The 2021–22 NK Istra 1961 season was the club's 61st season in existence and the 13th consecutive season in the top flight of Croatian football.

== First-team squad ==
As of 22 April 2022

Note: Flags indicate national team as defined under FIFA eligibility rules; some limited exceptions apply. Players may hold more than one non-FIFA nationality.

No.	Pos.	Nation	Player
1	GK	AUT	Ivan Lučić
2	DF	CRO	Luka Hujber
3	DF	GHA	Gideon Acquah (on loan from Montijo)
4	MF	CRO	Frano Mlinar
5	MF	ARG	Facundo Cáseres (on loan from Vélez Sarsfield)
6	MF	ESP	Antonio Perera (on loan from Deportivo Alavés)
7	MF	CRO	Slavko Blagojević
8	MF	ESP	Einar Galilea
10	FW	CRO	Robert Mišković
11	FW	BRA	Lucas Moura
12	DF	ESP	Rafa Navarro
14	DF	CRO	Luka Marin
16	MF	ARG	Gonzalo Desio
17	MF	MTN	Abdallahi Mahmoud (on loan from Deportivo Alavés)

No.	Pos.	Nation	Player
18	FW	BFA	Hassane Bandé (on loan from Ajax)
20	MF	CRO	Antonio Ivančić
21	GK	CRO	Lovro Majkić
23	FW	CRO	Dion Drena Beljo (on loan from Osijek)
25	GK	CHI	Gonzalo Collao
27	DF	CRO	Bernardo Matić
31	DF	CRO	Fran Vujnović
32	DF	CRO	Mihael Rovis
34	FW	CRO	Mateo Lisica
36	MF	CRO	Mateo Tomić
39	DF	CRO	Mauro Perković
44	DF	POR	João Silva (on loan from Deportivo Alavés)
77	MF	CRO	Dino Kapitanović

== Transfers ==
=== In ===
Pos	Player	Transferred from	Fee	Date	Source
FW	(Croatia) Robert Perić-Komšić	(Croatia) Cibalia	Back from loan	30 May 2021	
DF	(Croatia) Bernardo Matić	(Spain) Racing de Santander	Free	8 June 2021	
MF	(Croatia) Frano Mlinar	(Croatia) Slaven Belupo	Free	8 June 2021	
FW	(Nigeria) Theophilus Solomon	(Kuwait) Qadsia SC	Free	8 June 2021	
FW	(Croatia) Miroslav Iličić	(Croatia) Slaven Belupo	Free	9 June 2021	
DF	(Serbia) Damjan Daničić	(Croatia) Dinamo Zagreb	Loan	18 June 2021	
DF	(Portugal) João Silva	(Spain) Deportivo Alavés	Loan	20 June 2021	
DF	(Spain) Rafa Navarro	(Spain) Deportivo Alavés	Free	25 June 2021	
GK	(Croatia) Tony Macan	(Croatia) Uljanik	Back from loan	30 June 2021	
MF	(Spain) Einar Galilea	(Spain) Deportivo Alavés	Free	30 June 2021	
FW	(Croatia) Robert Mišković	(Croatia) Osijek	Free	30 June 2021	
GK	(Chile) Gonzalo Collao	(Spain) Extremadura	Free	10 July 2021	
FW	(Croatia) Dion Drena Beljo	(Croatia) Osijek	Loan	14 July 2021	
DF	(Croatia) Luka Marin	(Croatia) Osijek	Free	17 July 2021	
FW	(Russia) Serder Serderov	(Hungary) Mezőkövesd	Free	6 August 2021	
MF	(Argentina) Gonzalo Desio	(Argentina) Estudiantes de La Plata	Free	9 August 2021	
DF	(Nigeria) Erhun Obanor	(Albania) Kukësi	Free	17 August 2021	
MF	(Mauritania) Abdallahi Mahmoud	(Spain) Deportivo Alavés	Loan	18 August 2021	
MF	(Wales) Robbie Burton	(Croatia) Dinamo Zagreb	Loan	21 August 2021	
MF	(Argentina) Facundo Cáseres	(Argentina) Vélez Sarsfield	Loan	22 August 2021	
DF	(Ghana) Gideon Acquah	(Spain) Montijo	Loan	4 January 2022	
FW	(Brazil) Lucas Moura	(Brazil) São José	Free	18 January 2022	
GK	(Croatia) Jan Paus-Kunšt	(Croatia) Karlovac 1919	Recalled from loan	4 February 2022	
MF	(Croatia) Dino Kapitanović	(Croatia) Dinamo Zagreb II	Free	15 February 2022	

Source: Glasilo Hrvatskog nogometnog saveza

=== Out ===
Pos	Player	Transferred to	Fee	Date	Source
GK	(Cameroon) Fabrice Ondoa	(Spain) Deportivo Alavés	Back from loan	28 May 2021	
FW	(Croatia) Šime Gržan	(Croatia) Osijek	Free	28 May 2021	
MF	(Senegal) Arona Sané	No team	Free	29 May 2021	
MF	(Wales) Dylan Levitt	(England) Manchester United	Back from loan	30 May 2021	
FW	(Croatia) Josip Špoljarić	(Croatia) Osijek	Back from loan	30 May 2021	
FW	(Croatia) Leon Šipoš	(Latvia) Spartaks Jūrmala	Back from loan	31 May 2021	
DF	(Spain) Rafael Páez	No team	Free	1 June 2021	
MF	(Croatia) Dino Halilović	No team	Free	1 June 2021	
GK	(Croatia) Lovro Juric	No team	Free	2 June 2021	
FW	(Croatia) Robert Perić-Komšić	No team	Free	2 June 2021	
DF	(Croatia) Josip Tomašević	No team	Free	3 June 2021	
DF	(Croatia) Josip Šutalo	(Croatia) Dinamo Zagreb	Back from loan	15 June 2021	
MF	(Croatia) Matej Vuk	(Croatia) Rijeka	Back from loan	15 June 2021	
DF	(Portugal) João Silva	(Spain) Deportivo Alavés	Free	19 June 2021	
DF	(Croatia) Petar Bosančić	No team	Free	23 June 2021	
FW	(Japan) Taichi Hara	(Spain) Deportivo Alavés	Undisclosed	24 June 2021	
DF	(Spain) Rafa Navarro	(Spain) Deportivo Alavés	Back from loan	25 June 2021	
MF	(Spain) Einar Galilea	(Spain) Deportivo Alavés	Back from loan	29 June 2021	
MF	(Montenegro) Stefan Lončar	(Spain) Deportivo Alavés	Back from loan	1 July 2021	
GK	(Croatia) Tony Macan	(Croatia) Rudar Labin	Free	2 July 2021	
MF	(Croatia) Donato Bernobić	(Croatia) BSK Bijelo Brdo	Loan	12 July 2021	
DF	(Spain) Sergi González	(Spain) Deportivo Alavés	Back from loan	21 July 2021	
FW	(Bosnia and Herzegovina) Gedeon Guzina	No team	Free	21 July 2021	
DF	(Austria) Mario Lovre Vojković	No team	Free	22 July 2021	
FW	(Nigeria) Theophilus Solomon	(Kosovo) Ballkani	Free	3 August 2021	
GK	(Croatia) Jan Paus-Kunšt	(Croatia) Karlovac 1919	Loan	10 August 2021	
DF	(Serbia) Damjan Daničić	(Croatia) Dinamo Zagreb	Recalled from loan	31 December 2021	
MF	(Wales) Robbie Burton	(Croatia) Dinamo Zagreb	Recalled from loan	31 December 2021	
DF	(Nigeria) Erhun Obanor	(Cyprus) PAEEK	Loan	2 January 2022	
DF	(Croatia) David Legović	(Croatia) Osijek	Undisclosed	28 January 2022	
GK	(Croatia) Jan Paus-Kunšt	(Croatia) Cres	Loan	8 February 2022	
FW	(Croatia) Miroslav Iličić	(Slovenia) Celje	Free	14 February 2022	
FW	(Croatia) Josip Hmura	(Croatia) Jadran Poreč	Loan	24 February 2022	
FW	(Russia) Serder Serderov	(Kazakhstan) Aktobe	Loan	22 April 2022	

Source: Glasilo Hrvatskog nogometnog saveza

Total spending: ▼0 €

Total income: ▲0 €

Total expenditure: ▲0 €

== Competitions ==
=== Overview ===
Competition	First match	Last match	Starting round	Final position	Record							
Competition	First match	Last match	Starting round	Final position	Pld	W	D	L	GF	GA	GD	Win %
HT Prva liga	18 July 2021	20 May 2022	Matchday 1	9th	36	7	10	19	42	67	−25	19.44
Croatian Cup	21 September 2021	30 November 2021	First Round	Quarter-finals	3	2	1	0	8	4	+4	66.67
Total					39	9	11	19	50	71	−21	23.08

Last updated: 21 May 2022
Source: Soccerway

=== HT Prva liga ===
==== League table ====
Pos	Team	Pld	W	D	L	GF	GA	GD	Pts	Qualification or relegation
6	Gorica	36	12	9	15	43	50	−7	45	
7	Slaven Belupo	36	9	9	18	35	54	−19	36	
8	Šibenik	36	9	5	22	46	75	−29	32	
9	Istra 1961	36	7	10	19	42	67	−25	31	
10	Hrvatski Dragovoljac (R)	36	4	7	25	31	75	−44	19	Relegation to First Football League

Source: PrvaHNL.hr
Rules for classification: 1) Points; 2) Head-to-head points; 3) Head-to-head goal difference; 4) Head-to-head goals scored (at home if two teams tied); 5) Goal difference; 6) Goals scored; 7) Play-off
(Note: Criteria 2-4 and 7 is only used if deciding champion, teams to international competition or teams for relegation and in that case criteria 6 will not be used).
(R) Relegated

==== Results summary ====
Overall								Home						Away					
Pld	W	D	L	GF	GA	GD	Pts	W	D	L	GF	GA	GD	W	D	L	GF	GA	GD
36	7	10	19	42	67	−25	31	6	2	10	31	35	−4	1	8	9	11	32	−21

Last updated: 21 May 2022.
Source: Prva HNL

==== Results by round ====
Round	1	2	3	4	5	6	7	8	9	10	11	12	13	14	15	16	17	18	19	20	21	22	23	24	25	26	27	28	29	30	31	32	33	34	35	36
Ground	H	A	H	H	A	H	A	H	A	A	H	A	A	H	A	H	A	H	H	A	H	H	A	H	A	H	A	A	H	A	A	H	A	H	A	H
Result	W	L	L	L	L	W	L	L	D	W	L	D	D	W	L	L	L	L	W	L	W	L	D	L	L	D	D	D	L	D	L	D	D	L	L	W
Position	2	7	8	8	9	7	8	8	8	8	8	8	8	8	8	8	8	9	8	9	9	9	9	9	9	9	9	9	9	8	9	9	9	9	9	9

Updated to match(es) played on 20 May 2022. Source: Prva HNL
A = Away; H = Home; W = Win; D = Draw; L = Loss

==== Matches ====
18 July 2021 1	Istra 1961	3–1	Hrvatski Dragovoljac	Pula
18:55 CEST (UTC+02:00)	Bandé 10', 17'; Matić 45+3'; Mlinar (yellow card) 49'	Report	Sekulić (yellow card) 29'; Bašić (yellow card) 35'; Jazvić (yellow card) 45+2'; Roca (yellow card) 77'; Veljača 90+3'	Stadium: Stadion Aldo Drosina; Attendance: 713; Referee: Mario Zebec

25 July 2021 2	Rijeka	2–0	Istra 1961	Rijeka
18:55 CEST (UTC+02:00)	Drmić 78', 82'; Obregón (yellow card) 81'	Report	Blagojević (yellow card) 18'; Matić (yellow card) 25'; Perera (yellow card) 44'; Siljan (yellow card) 90+5'	Stadium: Stadion Rujevica; Attendance: 2,015; Referee: Fran Jović

31 July 2021 3	Istra 1961	1–2	Gorica	Pula
20:00 CEST (UTC+02:00)	Perera (yellow card) 71'; Bandé 90+2'; Matić (yellow card) 90+4'	Report	Krizmanić (yellow card) 10'; Lovrić 19' (yellow card) 77'; Keita (yellow card) 42'; Dieye 68'; Martinsson Ngouali (yellow card) 72'	Stadium: Stadion Aldo Drosina; Attendance: 536; Referee: Zdenko Lovrić

14 August 2021 5	Lokomotiva	4–0	Istra 1961	Zagreb
18:55 CEST (UTC+02:00)	Cipetić (yellow card) 6'; Kačavenda (yellow card) 13'; Dabro 20', 49' (yellow card) 20'; Aliyu 31', 45'; de Haas (yellow card) 65'	Report	Navarro (yellow card) 24'; Blagojević (yellow card) 33'; Daničić (yellow card) 68'	Stadium: Stadion Kranjčevićeva; Attendance: 307; Referee: Tihomir Pejin

31 July 2021 6	Istra 1961	2–0	Osijek	Pula
18:55 CEST (UTC+02:00)	Blagojević (yellow card) 43'; Beljo (yellow card) 53'; Bandé 83'; Mišković 90+4'	Report	Bohar (yellow card) 36'; Nejašmić (yellow card) 61'	Stadium: Stadion Aldo Drosina; Attendance: 621; Referee: Ivan Bebek

28 August 2021 7	Šibenik	3–1	Istra 1961	Šibenik
21:00 CEST (UTC+02:00)	Delić 17'; M. Jakoliš 22', 32' (yellow card) 76'; Mina (yellow card) 64'; Marin (yellow card) 74'; Bedoya (yellow card) 90+2'	Report	Perera (yellow card) 32'; Silva (yellow card) 56'; Navarro (yellow card) 61'; Beljo 74'; Bandé (yellow card) 76'; Mahmoud (yellow card) 76'; Daničić (yellow card) 90+4'	Stadium: Stadion Šubićevac; Attendance: 501; Referee: Ante Čuljak

12 September 2021 8	Istra 1961	1–3	Hajduk Split	Pula
17:00 CEST (UTC+02:00)	Mahmoud (yellow card) 45'; Beljo 88'; Daničić (yellow card) 90'; Bandé (yellow card) 90+4'	Report	Krovinović (yellow card) 39'; Livaja 52' (pen.) 58' (pen.) 74'	Stadium: Stadion Aldo Drosina; Attendance: 1,761; Referee: Dario Bel

18 September 2021 9	Slaven Belupo	1–1	Istra 1961	Koprivnica
17:00 CEST (UTC+02:00)	Marina (yellow card) 15'; Krstanović 49' (pen.); Brković (yellow card) 64'; Monjac (yellow card) 90+1'	Report	Mahmoud (yellow card) 14'; Navarro (red card) 37'; Perković 90+4'	Stadium: Gradski stadion Attendance: 487; Referee: Zdenko Lovrić

27 September 2021 10	Hrvatski Dragovoljac	0–1	Istra 1961	Zagreb
18:00 CEST (UTC+02:00)	Bašić (yellow card) 59'; Majstorović (yellow card) 79'; Mamić (yellow card) 81'; Bagadur (yellow card) 90+1'	Report	Beljo 19'; Mlinar (yellow card) 47'; Perera (yellow card) 83'; Silva (yellow card) 87'	Stadium: Stadion Kranjčevićeva; Attendance: 92; Referee: Duje Strukan

2 October 2021 11	Istra 1961	3–6	Rijeka	Pula
19:05 CEST (UTC+02:00)	Silva 18'; Blagojević (yellow card) 46'; Galilea (yellow card) 55'; Mahmoud 59'; Lisica 78'	Report	Krešić 24' (yellow card) 88'; Smolčić (yellow card) 27'; Pavičić 32', 37'; Ampem (yellow card) 35' (goal) 52'; Vučkić 41' (yellow card) 50'; Escoval (yellow card) 44'; Bušnja 85'; Selahi (yellow card) 88'	Stadium: Stadion Aldo Drosina; Attendance: 1,274; Referee: Fran Jović

16 October 2021 12	Gorica	1–1	Istra 1961	Velika Gorica
15:00 CEST (UTC+02:00)	Mlinar 12' (o.g.); Sarić (yellow card) 45+2'; Muhammed (yellow card) 83'; Keita (yellow card) 90+2'	Report	Mlinar (yellow card) 24'; Bandé (yellow card) 35' (goal) 54'; Perera (yellow card) 56'; Blagojević (yellow card) 74'	Stadium: Stadion Radnik; Attendance: 386; Referee: Tihomir Pejin

24 October 2021 13	Dinamo Zagreb	1–1	Istra 1961	Zagreb
15:00 CEST (UTC+02:00)	Franjić (yellow card) 56'; Perić 84'	Report	Mišković (yellow card) 71'; Beljo 79'; Silva (yellow card) 87'; Hujber (yellow card) 89'; Mahmoud (yellow card) 90+4'	Stadium: Stadion Maksimir; Attendance: 1,300; Referee: Mario Zebec

1 November 2021 14	Istra 1961	2–1	Lokomotiva	Pula
18:00 CET (UTC+01:00)	Nevistić 8' (o.g.); Bandé (yellow card) 20'; Marin (yellow card) 38'; Galilea (yellow card) 38'; Beljo 54' (pen.); Serderov (yellow card) 90+2'	Report	Dabro 15'; Mersinaj (yellow card) 33'; Cipetić (yellow card) 45'; Florucz (yellow card) 84'	Stadium: Stadion Aldo Drosina; Attendance: 261; Referee: Igor Pajač

6 November 2021 15	Osijek	3–0	Istra 1961	Osijek
15:00 CET (UTC+01:00)	Žaper 5'; Topčagić 59'; Fiolić 75'	Report	Mlinar (yellow card) 8'; Mahmoud (yellow card) 17'; Perera (yellow card) 51'; Mišković (yellow card) 68'	Stadium: Gradski Vrt Stadium; Attendance: 1,177; Referee: Mario Zebec

20 November 2021 16	Istra 1961	3–4	Šibenik	Pula
17:05 CET (UTC+01:00)	L. Marin 44'; Hujber (yellow card) 45'; Desio (yellow card) 65'; Bandé (yellow card) 66'; Mlinar (yellow card) 77'; Beljo 82'; Mišković 88'; Galilea (yellow card) 90+4'; Collao (yellow card) 90+5'	Report	M. Jakoliš 39', 90+5'; Delić 61', 72'; Bilić (yellow card) 90+4'	Stadium: Stadion Aldo Drosina; Attendance: 372; Referee: Goran Pečarić

26 November 2021 17	Hajduk Split	4–0	Istra 1961	Split
20:00 CET (UTC+01:00)	Ljubičić 11'; Fossati 27' (yellow card) 29'; Krovinović 70'; Livaja 90+2'	Report	Perera (yellow card) 11'; Beljo (yellow card) 43'	Stadium: Stadion Poljud; Attendance: 4,560; Referee: Fran Jović

6 December 2021 18	Istra 1961	1–2	Slaven Belupo	Pula
18:00 CET (UTC+01:00)	Silva (yellow card) 18' (yellow-red card) 66'; Perera (yellow card) 35'; Mišković 51'; Perković (yellow card) 79'	Report	Zapata 20'; Hadžić 31'; Brković (yellow card) 38'; Kocijan (yellow card) 58'; Paracki (yellow card) 72'; Krstanović (yellow card) 79'	Stadium: Stadion Aldo Drosina; Attendance: 374; Referee: Ante Čuljak

10 December 2021 19	Istra 1961	3–0	Hrvatski Dragovoljac	Pula
18:00 CET (UTC+01:00)	Mahmoud 19'; Bandé 27'; Lisica 72'; Hujber (yellow card) 76'; Mlinar (yellow card) 79'; Marin (yellow card) 87'	Report	Majstorović (yellow card) 40'	Stadium: Stadion Aldo Drosina; Attendance: 296; Referee: Jakov Titlić

15 December 2021 4	Istra 1961	0–2	Dinamo Zagreb	Pula
18:00 CET (UTC+01:00)	Perera (yellow card) 51'; Mahmoud (yellow card) 55'; Blagojević (yellow card) 81'; Lučić (red card) 89'; Cáseres (yellow card) 90+6'	Report	Gojak 10'; Théophile-Catherine (yellow card) 53' (yellow-red card) 81'; Petković (yellow card) 74' (yellow-red card) 88'; Ristovski 90+8'	Stadium: Stadion Aldo Drosina; Attendance: 952; Referee: Duje Strukan

18 December 2021 20	Rijeka	1–0	Istra 1961	Rijeka
17:05 CET (UTC+01:00)	Obregón 82'	Report		Stadium: Stadion Rujevica; Attendance: 3,255; Referee: Jakov Titlić

28 January 2022 21	Istra 1961	2–1	Gorica	Pula
18:00 CET (UTC+01:00)	Marin (yellow card) 44'; Lučić (yellow card) 45'; Perković 58'; Beljo 74'; Serderov (yellow card) 82'	Report	Jovičić 6'; Kalik (yellow card) 45+1'; Keita (yellow card) 69'; Babec (yellow card) 72'; Muhammed (yellow card) 82'	Stadium: Stadion Aldo Drosina; Attendance: 262; Referee: Fran Jović

6 February 2022 22	Istra 1961	1–2	Dinamo Zagreb	Pula
17:05 CET (UTC+01:00)	Perera (yellow card) 7'; Mišković 45+1'; Cáseres (yellow card) 49' (yellow-red card) 64'; Perković (yellow card) 53'; Mahmoud (yellow card) 67'	Report	Oršić 30', 55' (pen.); Ivanušec (yellow card) 45'; Livaković (yellow card) 67'; Petković (yellow card) 82'; Ristovski (yellow card) 85'	Stadium: Stadion Aldo Drosina; Attendance: 1,408; Referee: Zdenko Lovrić

12 February 2022 23	Lokomotiva	1–1	Istra 1961	Zagreb
15:00 CET (UTC+01:00)	Salihu (yellow card) 8' (yellow-red card) 43'; Kulenović 80'; Çokaj (yellow card) 90'; Aliyu (yellow card) 90+2'	Report	Galilea (yellow card) 50'; Beljo 54'; Mahmoud (yellow card) 56'; Perera (yellow card) 59'; Perković (yellow card) 75'	Stadium: Stadion Kranjčevićeva; Attendance: 326; Referee: Tihomir Pejin

19 February 2022 24	Istra 1961	2–3	Osijek	Pula
17:05 CET (UTC+01:00)	Silva (yellow card) 55'; Beljo 57'; Galilea 84'	Report	Caktaš 27'; Marin 40' (o.g.); Jurčević (yellow card) 45'; Miérez (yellow card) 50'; Cheberko (yellow card) 79'; Žaper (yellow card) 89'; Mance 90+5'	Stadium: Stadion Aldo Drosina; Attendance: 762; Referee: Duje Strukan

27 February 2022 25	Šibenik	2–1	Istra 1961	Šibenik
15:00 CET (UTC+01:00)	Marin 53'; Rak (yellow card) 53'; Delić 64'	Report	Beljo 45+2'; Perera (yellow card) 57'	Stadium: Stadion Šubićevac; Attendance: 776; Referee: Ivana Martinčić

6 March 2022 26	Istra 1961	1–1	Hajduk Split	Pula
17:05 CET (UTC+01:00)	Beljo 54'; Mahmoud (yellow card) 70'	Report	N. Kalinić 30' (yellow card) 61'; Mikanović (yellow card) 63'	Stadium: Stadion Aldo Drosina; Attendance: 3,981; Referee: Tihomir Pejin

12 March 2022 27	Slaven Belupo	0–0	Istra 1961	Koprivnica
15:00 CET (UTC+01:00)	Marina (yellow card) 5'; Goda (yellow card) 29'; Brković (yellow card) 62'; Bosec (yellow card) 73'; Crnac (yellow card) 90+3'	Report	Hujber (yellow card) 29'; Mlinar (yellow card) 41'; Ivančić (yellow card) 65'; Perera (yellow card) 88'	Stadium: Gradski stadion Attendance: 450; Referee: Dario Kulušić

18 March 2022 28	Hrvatski Dragovoljac	0–0	Istra 1961	Zagreb
18:00 CET (UTC+01:00)	Jurišić (yellow card) 38'	Report		Stadium: Stadion Kranjčevićeva; Attendance: 200; Referee: Zdenko Lovrić

2 April 2022 29	Istra 1961	0–2	Rijeka	Pula
19:05 CEST (UTC+02:00)	Galilea (yellow card) 11'; Perera (yellow card) 65'; Mahmoud (yellow card) 76'; Serderov (yellow card) 90+1'	Report	Vukčević (yellow card) 16'; Vučkić 29', 87'	Stadium: Stadion Aldo Drosina; Attendance: 2,170; Referee: Duje Strukan

8 April 2022 30	Gorica	1–1	Istra 1961	Velika Gorica
18:00 CEST (UTC+02:00)	Muhammed (yellow card) 54'; Mitrović 62' (yellow card) 67'	Report	Galilea (yellow card) 34'; Beljo 55' (pen.)	Stadium: Stadion Radnik; Attendance: 1,086; Referee: Ivan Bebek

15 April 2022 31	Dinamo Zagreb	3–0	Istra 1961	Zagreb
18:00 CEST (UTC+02:00)	Oršić 8', 45+1'; Emreli 50'	Report	Lučić (yellow card) 42'; Perković (yellow card) 45+1'; Mahmoud (yellow card) 90'	Stadium: Stadion Maksimir; Attendance: 2,607; Referee: Dario Kulušić

23 April 2022 32	Istra 1961	2–2	Lokomotiva	Pula
17:00 CEST (UTC+02:00)	Beljo 16'; Perera (yellow card) 37'; Cáseres 68'; Perković (yellow card) 85'	Report	Marić 27'; Mersinaj (yellow card) 47'; Kulenović 90+5'	Stadium: Stadion Aldo Drosina; Attendance: 500; Referee: Dario Bel

1 May 2022 33	Osijek	2–2	Istra 1961	Osijek
17:00 CEST (UTC+02:00)	Lovrić 4' (yellow card) 71'; Caktaš 12' (yellow card) 17'; Bralić (yellow card) 45+3'	Report	Perković 18'; Galilea 39' (yellow card) 71'; Beljo (yellow card) 45+3'; Cáseres (yellow card) 53'; Rovis (yellow card) 64'; Hujber (yellow card) 82'; Mlinar (yellow card) 84'; Collao (yellow card) 90+1'	Stadium: Gradski Vrt Stadium; Attendance: 2,668; Referee: Duje Strukan

7 May 2022 34	Istra 1961	1–2	Šibenik	Pula
19:05 CEST (UTC+02:00)	Perera (yellow card) 31'; Rovis (yellow card) 44'; Cáseres 73'; Mišković (yellow card) 77'	Report	Šimunović (yellow card) 7'; Delić 26'; Ćurić 45+1' (pen.); Vidović (yellow card) 59'; Marin (yellow card) 76'; Asanović (yellow card) 81'	Stadium: Stadion Aldo Drosina; Attendance: 684; Referee: Ante Čulina

14 May 2022 35	Hajduk Split	3–1	Istra 1961	Split
19:05 CEST (UTC+02:00)	Livaja (yellow card) 32' (goal) 45+2' (pen.), 52' (pen.); Krovinović 54'	Report	Mahmoud 15' (yellow card) 16' (yellow-red card) 45+4'; Blagojević (yellow card) 45+1'; Cáseres (yellow card) 50'; Perković (yellow card) 69'	Stadium: Stadion Poljud; Attendance: 16,056; Referee: Zdenko Lovrić

20 May 2022 36	Istra 1961	3–1	Slaven Belupo	Pula
18:00 CEST (UTC+02:00)	Blagojević (yellow card) 18' (yellow-red card) 71'; Galilea (yellow card) 45+1'; Beljo 48' (pen.), 90+4'; Bandé 54'	Report	Liklin (yellow card) 35'; Bosec (yellow card) 67'; Zvonarek 76'	Stadium: Stadion Aldo Drosina; Attendance: 559; Referee: Fran Jović

Source: Croatian Football Federation

=== Croatian Football Cup ===
21 September 2021 R1	Vuteks Sloga	0–3	Istra 1961	Vukovar
15:30 CEST (UTC+02:00)	Popin (yellow card) 39'	Report	Blagojević (yellow card) 44'; Obanor 54'; Mahmoud 76' (yellow card) 81'; Silva (yellow card) 89'; Beljo 90'	Stadium: NK Vuteks; Attendance: 400; Referee: Goran Pečarić

27 October 2021 R2	Rudar Labin	2–3	Istra 1961	Labin
15:30 CEST (UTC+02:00)	Licul 33'; Kurtić (yellow card) 35'; Boucaux 52'	Report	Beljo 6' 70'; Serderov 76'	Stadium: NK Rudar; Attendance: 350; Referee: Ivana Martinčić

30 November 2021 QF	Gorica	2–2 (4–2 p)	Istra 1961	Velika Gorica
16:00 CET (UTC+01:00)	Fruk (yellow card) 34'; Dieye 45+2'; Muhammed (yellow card) 38'; Lovrić (yellow card) 51' (goal) 90+6'; Steenvoorden (yellow card) 88'; Suk (yellow card) 95'	Report	Beljo 11', 80'; Hujber (yellow card) 36'; Marin (yellow card) 69'; Mlinar (yellow card) 88'; Lučić (yellow card) 90+1'; Desio (yellow card) 90+2'	Stadium: Stadion Radnik; Attendance: 320; Referee: Duje Strukan
	Penalties
	Jovičić (penalty scored); Suk (penalty scored); Brodić (penalty scored); Steenvoorden (penalty scored)		Desio (penalty scored); Galilea (penalty scored); Iličić (penalty missed); Silva (penalty missed)

Source: Croatian Football Federation

== Player seasonal records ==
Updated 21 May 2022

=== Goals ===
Rank	Name	League	Cup	Total
1	(Croatia) Dion Drena Beljo	15	5	20
2	(Burkina Faso) Hassane Bandé	7	–	7
3	(Croatia) Robert Mišković	4	–	4
3	(Mauritania) Abdallahi Mahmoud	3	1	4
5	(Croatia) Mauro Perković	3	–	3
6	(Argentina) Facundo Cáseres	2	–	2
6	(Spain) Einar Galilea	2	–	2
6	(Croatia) Mateo Lisica	2	–	2
9	(Croatia) Luka Marin	1	–	1
9	(Croatia) Bernardo Matić	1	–	1
9	(Portugal) João Silva	1	–	1
9	(Nigeria) Erhun Obanor	–	1	1
9	(Russia) Serder Serderov	–	1	1
Own goals		1	–	1
TOTALS		42	8	50

Source: Competitive matches

=== Clean sheets ===
Rank	Name	League	Cup	Total
1	(Austria) Ivan Lučić	5	–	5
2	(Chile) Gonzalo Collao	–	1	1
TOTALS		5	1	6

Source: Competitive matches

=== Disciplinary record ===
Number	Position	Player	1. HNL			Croatian Cup			Total		
Number	Position	Player	Yellow card	(yellow card) (yellow-red card)	Red card	Yellow card	(yellow card) (yellow-red card)	Red card	Yellow card	(yellow card) (yellow-red card)	Red card
1	GK	(Austria) Ivan Lučić	2	0	1	1	0	0	3	0	1
2	DF	(Croatia) Luka Hujber	5	0	0	1	0	0	6	0	0
4	MF	(Croatia) Frano Mlinar	8	0	0	1	0	0	9	0	0
5	MF	(Argentina) Facundo Cáseres	3	1	0	0	0	0	3	1	0
6	MF	(Spain) Antonio Perera	16	0	0	0	0	0	16	0	0
7	MF	(Croatia) Slavko Blagojević	7	1	0	1	0	0	8	1	0
8	MF	(Spain) Einar Galilea	8	0	0	0	0	0	8	0	0
10	FW	(Croatia) Robert Mišković	3	0	0	0	0	0	3	0	0
11	DF	(Serbia) Damjan Daničić	3	0	0	0	0	0	3	0	0
12	DF	(Spain) Rafa Navarro	2	0	1	0	0	0	2	0	1
14	DF	(Croatia) Luka Marin	3	0	0	1	0	0	4	0	0
16	MF	(Argentina) Gonzalo Desio	1	0	0	1	0	0	2	0	0
17	MF	(Mauritania) Abdallahi Mahmoud	11	1	0	1	0	0	12	1	0
18	FW	(Burkina Faso) Hassane Bandé	5	0	0	0	0	0	5	0	0
20	MF	(Croatia) Antonio Ivančić	1	0	0	0	0	0	1	0	0
23	FW	(Croatia) Dion Drena Beljo	3	0	0	0	0	0	3	0	0
25	GK	(Chile) Gonzalo Collao	2	0	0	0	0	0	2	0	0
27	DF	(Croatia) Bernardo Matić	2	0	0	0	0	0	2	0	0
28	FW	(Russia) Serder Serderov	3	0	0	0	0	0	3	0	0
32	DF	(Croatia) Mihael Rovis	2	0	0	0	0	0	2	0	0
33	MF	(Croatia) Antonio Siljan	1	0	0	0	0	0	1	0	0
39	DF	(Croatia) Mauro Perković	6	0	0	0	0	0	6	0	0
44	DF	(Portugal) João Silva	4	1	0	1	0	0	5	1	0
TOTALS			101	4	2	8	0	0	109	4	2

=== Appearances and goals ===
Number	Position	Player	Apps	Goals	Apps	Goals	Apps	Goals
Number	Position	Player	Total		1. HNL (Note: First number represents appearances in starting eleven, while the second number indicates a substitute appearance.)		Croatian Cup	
1	GK	(Austria) Ivan Lučić	32	0	31+0	0	1+0	0
2	DF	(Croatia) Luka Hujber	27	0	23+1	0	3+0	0
3	DF	(Nigeria) Erhun Obanor	3	1	0+1	0	1+1	1
4	MF	(Croatia) Frano Mlinar	35	0	29+3	0	3+0	0
5	MF	(Argentina) Facundo Cáseres	18	2	13+4	2	0+1	0
6	MF	(Spain) Antonio Perera	33	0	29+1	0	1+2	0
7	MF	(Croatia) Slavko Blagojević	25	0	16+7	0	2+0	0
8	MF	(Spain) Einar Galilea	33	2	30+2	2	1+0	0
9	FW	(Croatia) Miroslav Iličić	13	0	4+7	0	1+1	0
10	FW	(Croatia) Robert Mišković	37	4	19+16	4	2+0	0
11	DF	(Serbia) Damjan Daničić	13	0	3+9	0	1+0	0
11	FW	(Brazil) Lucas Moura	4	0	0+4	0	0+0	0
12	DF	(Spain) Rafa Navarro	12	0	11+1	0	0+0	0
14	DF	(Croatia) Luka Marin	25	1	21+2	1	2+0	0
16	MF	(Argentina) Gonzalo Desio	13	0	1+9	0	0+3	0
17	MF	(Mauritania) Abdallahi Mahmoud	27	4	15+9	3	2+1	1
18	FW	(Burkina Faso) Hassane Bandé	31	7	24+5	7	2+0	0
20	MF	(Croatia) Antonio Ivančić	15	0	6+9	0	0+0	0
21	GK	(Croatia) Lovro Majkić	2	0	2+0	0	0+0	0
22	FW	(Bosnia and Herzegovina) Branko Đukić	1	0	0+1	0	0+0	0
23	FW	(Croatia) Dion Drena Beljo	37	20	30+4	15	2+1	5
25	GK	(Chile) Gonzalo Collao	7	0	3+2	0	2+0	0
26	MF	(Wales) Robbie Burton	1	0	0+1	0	0+0	0
27	DF	(Croatia) Bernardo Matić	5	1	5+0	1	0+0	0
28	FW	(Russia) Serder Serderov	24	1	6+15	0	2+1	1
31	DF	(Croatia) Fran Vujnović	2	0	0+2	0	0+0	0
32	DF	(Croatia) Mihael Rovis	8	0	5+3	0	0+0	0
33	MF	(Croatia) Antonio Siljan	2	0	0+2	0	0+0	0
34	MF	(Croatia) Mateo Lisica	31	2	20+8	2	1+2	0
35	DF	(Croatia) Antonio Maurić	3	0	0+3	0	0+0	0
36	MF	(Croatia) Mateo Tomić	1	0	1+0	0	0+0	0
39	DF	(Croatia) Mauro Perković	26	3	20+5	3	1+0	0
44	DF	(Portugal) João Silva	33	1	29+1	1	3+0	0
77	MF	(Croatia) Dino Kapitanović	7	0	0+7	0	0+0	0
