= 2020–21 GNK Dinamo Zagreb season =

Dinamo Zagreb
2020–21 season
- President: Mirko Barišić
- Head coach: Zoran Mamić (until 15 March); Damir Krznar (from 15 March)
- Stadium: Stadion Maksimir
- Prva HNL: 1st
- Croatian Cup: Winners
- UEFA Champions League: Third qualifying round
- UEFA Europa League: Quarter-finals
- Top goalscorer: League: Mario Gavranović (17); All: Mislav Oršić (24)
Home colours	Away colours	Third colours

The 2020–21 GNK Dinamo Zagreb season was the club's 110th season in existence and its 30th consecutive season in the top flight of Croatian football. In addition to the domestic league, Dinamo Zagreb participated in this season's editions of the Croatian Football Cup, the UEFA Champions League, and the UEFA Europa League. The season covered the period from 26 July 2020 to 30 June 2021.

== First-team squad ==
As of 22 May 2021

Squad no.	Name	Nat.	Pos.	Date of birth	Signed from	Apps	Goals
Goalkeepers
1	Danijel Zagorac	(Croatia)	GK	7 February 1987 (aged 34)	(Croatia) Split	56	0
33	Renato Josipović	(Croatia)	GK	12 June 2001 (aged 19)	Youth Academy	2	0
40	Dominik Livaković (vice-captain)	(Croatia)	GK	9 January 1995 (aged 26)	(Croatia) Zagreb	186	0
Defenders
2	Sadegh Moharrami	(Iran)	RB	1 March 1996 (aged 25)	(Iran) Persepolis	50	0
4	Stefan Milić	(Montenegro)	CB	6 July 2000 (aged 20)	(Montenegro) Budućnost Podgorica	3	1
6	Rasmus Lauritsen	(Denmark)	CB	27 February 1996 (aged 25)	(Sweden) Norrköping	38	1
13	Stefan Ristovski	(North Macedonia)	RB	12 February 1992 (aged 29)	(Portugal) Sporting CP	16	0
19	Marijan Čabraja	(Croatia)	LB	25 February 1997 (aged 24)	(Croatia) Gorica	10	0
22	Marin Leovac	(Croatia)	LB	7 August 1988 (aged 32)	(Greece) PAOK	78	4
28	Kévin Théophile-Catherine	(France)	CB	28 October 1989 (aged 31)	(France) Saint-Étienne	103	3
30	Petar Stojanović	(Slovenia)	RB	7 October 1995 (aged 25)	(Slovenia) Maribor	183	2
32	Joško Gvardiol (on loan)	(Croatia)	CB/LB	23 January 2002 (aged 19)	(Germany) RB Leipzig	52	4
55	Dino Perić	(Croatia)	CB	12 July 1994 (aged 26)	(Croatia) Lokomotiva	108	5
Midfielders
5	Arijan Ademi (captain)	(North Macedonia)	DM	29 May 1991 (aged 29)	(Croatia) Šibenik	310	31
10	Lovro Majer	(Croatia)	AM	17 January 1998 (aged 23)	(Croatia) Lokomotiva	87	14
17	Luka Ivanušec	(Croatia)	AM	26 November 1998 (aged 22)	(Croatia) Lokomotiva	77	14
24	Marko Tolić	(Croatia)	AM	7 May 1996 (aged 25)	(Croatia) Lokomotiva	28	4
26	Robbie Burton	(Wales)	CM	26 December 1999 (aged 21)	(England) Arsenal U23	18	0
27	Josip Mišić (on loan)	(Croatia)	CM	28 June 1994 (aged 26)	(Portugal) Sporting CP	22	3
38	Bartol Franjić	(Croatia)	DM	14 January 2000 (aged 21)	Youth Academy	42	0
80	Iyayi Atiemwen	(Nigeria)	AM	24 January 1996 (aged 25)	(Croatia) Gorica	58	12
97	Kristijan Jakić	(Croatia)	DM	14 May 1997 (aged 24)	(Croatia) Lokomotiva	46	2
Forwards
8	Izet Hajrović	(Bosnia and Herzegovina)	RW	4 August 1991 (aged 29)	(Germany) Werder Bremen	87	14
11	Mario Gavranović	(Switzerland)	ST	24 November 1989 (aged 31)	(Croatia) Rijeka	128	47
20	Lirim Kastrati	(Kosovo)	RW	16 January 1999 (aged 22)	(Croatia) Lokomotiva	41	4
21	Bruno Petković	(Croatia)	ST	16 September 1994 (aged 26)	(Italy) Bologna	121	39
99	Mislav Oršić	(Croatia)	LW	29 December 1992 (aged 28)	(South Korea) Ulsan Hyundai	137	58

=== New contracts ===
Date	Pos	No.	Player	Ref.
11 December 2020	DF	2	(Iran) Sadegh Moharrami	
15 December 2020	MF	38	(Croatia) Bartol Franjić	
21 December 2020	MF	10	(Croatia) Lovro Majer	
5 February 2021	FW	99	(Croatia) Mislav Oršić	

== Transfers ==
=== In ===
No.	Pos	Player	Transferred from	Fee	Date	Source
97	MF	(Croatia) Kristijan Jakić	(Croatia) Lokomotiva	€1.2 million	24 July 2020	
4	DF	(Montenegro) Stefan Milić	(Montenegro) Budućnost Podgorica	€1.0 million	2 August 2020	
24	MF	(Croatia) Marko Tolić	(Croatia) Lokomotiva	€300,000	14 August 2020	
32	DF	(Croatia) Joško Gvardiol	(Germany) RB Leipzig	Loan	28 September 2020	
3	DF	(Denmark) Rasmus Lauritsen	(Sweden) Norrköping	€1.6 million	2 October 2020	
	FW	(Montenegro) Andrija Kolundžić	(Montenegro) Iskra Danilovgrad		5 October 2020	
	FW	(Montenegro) Milan Vukotić	(Montenegro) Budućnost Podgorica		5 October 2020	
27	MF	(Croatia) Josip Mišić	(Portugal) Sporting	Loan	19 October 2020	
	DF	(Netherlands) Dennis Gyamfi	(England) Leicester City	Free	11 December 2020	
	DF	(Croatia) Daniel Štefulj	(Croatia) Rijeka	€4.0 million	25 January 2021	
	GK	(Croatia) Ivan Nevistić	(Croatia) Rijeka	€4.0 million	27 January 2021	
19	DF	(Croatia) Marijan Čabraja	(Croatia) Gorica	€1.6 million	1 February 2021	
13	DF	(North Macedonia) Stefan Ristovski	(Portugal) Sporting	€1.3 million	2 February 2021	
	FW	(Croatia) Dario Špikić	(Croatia) Gorica	€600,000	4 February 2021	
	MF	(Croatia) Marko Bulat	(Croatia) Šibenik	€2.2 million	11 February 2021	
	DF	(Netherlands) Justin de Haas	(Netherlands) PSV Eindhoven	Loan	16 February 2021	

=== Loan returnees ===
No.	Pos	Player	Transferred from	Date	Source
	GK	(Croatia) Marko Mikulić	(Croatia) Sesvete	30 June 2020	
	FW	(Croatia) Borna Petrović	(Slovenia) Rudar Velenje	30 June 2020	
31	DF	(Croatia) Marko Lešković	(Croatia) Lokomotiva	30 June 2020	
	MF	(Croatia) Bojan Knežević	(Slovenia) Olimpija Ljubljana	31 July 2020	
23	FW	(Bosnia and Herzegovina) Luka Menalo	(Slovenia) Olimpija Ljubljana	31 July 2020	
6	DF	(Portugal) Ivo Pinto	(Portugal) Famalicão	2 August 2020	
9	FW	(Serbia) Komnen Andrić	(Croatia) Inter Zaprešić	5 August 2020	
	MF	(Nigeria) Iyayi Atiemwen	(Croatia) Lokomotiva	5 August 2020	
20	FW	(Kosovo) Lirim Kastrati	(Croatia) Lokomotiva	5 August 2020	
	DF	(Croatia) Tin Hrvoj	(Croatia) Varaždin	24 September 2020	
25	FW	(Croatia) Mario Ćuže	(Croatia) Lokomotiva	19 October 2020	
4	DF	(Montenegro) Stefan Milić	(Croatia) Varaždin	18 January 2021	
7	FW	(Croatia) Antonio Marin	(Italy) Monza	25 January 2021	

=== Out ===
No.	Pos	Player	Transferred to	Fee	Date	Source
	GK	(Croatia) Marko Mikulić	(Austria) Mauerwerk	Free	1 July 2020	
35	FW	(Croatia) Roko Baturina	(Hungary) Ferencváros	€1 million	3 August 2020	
	FW	(Croatia) Borna Petrović	(Austria) TSV Hartberg	Free	13 August 2020	
27	MF	(Croatia) Nikola Moro	(Russia) Dynamo Moscow	€8.5 million	17 August 2020	
92	MF	(Poland) Damian Kądzior	(Spain) Eibar	€2 million	29 August 2020	
98	GK	(Croatia) Adrian Šemper	(Italy) ChievoVerona	€1.5 million	1 September 2020	
18	FW	(Argentina) Matías Godoy	(Argentina) Atlético Rafaela	Return from loan	7 September 2020	
	DF	(Bosnia and Herzegovina) Vedad Radonja	(Greece) AEK Athens	€200,000	10 September 2020	
	DF	(Croatia) Mateo Leš	(Netherlands) Heracles Almelo	€250,000	15 September 2020	
66	DF	(Austria) Emir Dilaver	(Turkey) Çaykur Rizespor	€1 million	27 September 2020	
32	DF	(Croatia) Joško Gvardiol	(Germany) RB Leipzig	€16 million	28 September 2020	

=== Loan out ===
No.	Pos	Player	Transferred to	Fee	Date	Source
25	FW	(Croatia) Mario Ćuže	(Croatia) Lokomotiva	Free	12 August 2020	
36	FW	(Croatia) Marko Đira	(Croatia) Lokomotiva	Free	12 August 2020	
34	DF	(Croatia) Tin Hrvoj	(Croatia) Varaždin	Free	20 August 2020	
6	DF	(Portugal) Ivo Pinto	(Portugal) Rio Ave	Free	29 August 2020	
19	DF	(Switzerland) François Moubandje	(Turkey) Alanyaspor	Free	3 September 2020	
	FW	(Croatia) Marko Brkić	(Italy) Empoli	Free	17 September 2020	
77	FW	(Croatia) Sandro Kulenović	(Croatia) Rijeka	Free	21 September 2020	
7	FW	(Croatia) Antonio Marin	(Italy) Monza	Free	1 October 2020	
4	DF	(Montenegro) Stefan Milić	(Croatia) Varaždin	Free	1 October 2020	
14	MF	(Bosnia and Herzegovina) Amer Gojak	(Italy) Torino	Free	5 October 2020	
23	MF	(Bosnia and Herzegovina) Luka Menalo	(Croatia) Rijeka	Free	6 October 2020	
9	FW	(Serbia) Komnen Andrić	(Russia) Ufa	Free	15 October 2020	
18	DF	(Serbia) Damjan Daničić	(Croatia) Varaždin	Free	19 October 2020	
37	DF	(Croatia) Josip Šutalo	(Croatia) Istra 1961	Free	18 January 2021	
	DF	(Croatia) Daniel Štefulj	(Croatia) Rijeka	Free	25 January 2021	
	GK	(Croatia) Ivan Nevistić	(Croatia) Rijeka	Free	27 January 2021	
	FW	(Croatia) Dario Špikić	(Croatia) Gorica	Free	4 February 2021	
	FW	(Croatia) Mario Ćuže	(Ukraine) Dnipro-1	Free	6 February 2021	
	MF	(Croatia) Marko Bulat	(Croatia) Šibenik	Free	11 February 2021	

▼ Total Spending: €13,800,000

▲ Total Income: €30,450,000

▲ Net Income: €16,650,000

== Pre-season and friendlies ==
Win Draw Loss

8 August 2020 Friendly	Dinamo Zagreb (Croatia)	3–0	(Slovenia) Celje	Zagreb, Croatia
18:00 CEST (UTC+2)	Marin 7'; Gavranović 26'; Kulenović 51'	Report		Stadium: Stadion Maksimir; Attendance: 0 Referee: Fran Jović (Zagreb)
Note: Played behind closed doors due to the COVID-19 pandemic.

14 January 2021 Friendly	Dinamo Zagreb (Croatia)	2–1	(Hungary) MOL Fehérvár	Rovinj, Croatia
13:00 CET (UTC+1)	Oršić 20' (pen.); Petković (yellow card) 68', (goal) 78'; Leovac (yellow card) 75'	Report	Zivzivadze 13'; Kovács (yellow card) 16'; Rus (yellow card) 19'; Fiola (yellow card) 24' (yellow-red card) 81'	Stadium: Igralište Valbruna; Attendance: 0 Referee: Marin Vidulin (Kanfanar)
Note: Played behind closed doors due to the COVID-19 pandemic.

== Competitions ==
=== Overview ===
Competition	First match	Last match	Starting round	Final position	Record							
Competition	First match	Last match	Starting round	Final position	Pld	W	D	L	GF	GA	GD	Win %
Prva HNL	17 August 2020	22 May 2021	Matchday 1	Winners	36	26	7	3	84	28	+56	72.22
Croatian Cup	26 September 2020	19 May 2021	First round	Winners	5	5	0	0	21	5	+16	100.00
Champions League	26 August 2020	16 September 2020	Second qualifying round	Third qualifying round	2	0	1	1	3	4	−1	0.00
Europa League	1 October 2020	15 April 2021	Play-off round	Quarter-finals	13	8	2	3	20	9	+11	61.54
Total					56	39	10	7	128	46	+82	69.64

Last updated: 22 May 2021
Source: Soccerway

=== Prva HNL ===
==== League table ====
Pos	Team	Pld	W	D	L	GF	GA	GD	Pts	Qualification or relegation
1	Dinamo Zagreb (C)	36	26	7	3	84	28	+56	85	Qualification for the Champions League first qualifying round
2	Osijek	36	23	8	5	59	25	+34	77	Qualification for the Europa Conference League second qualifying round
3	Rijeka	36	18	7	11	51	46	+5	61	Qualification for the Europa Conference League second qualifying round
4	Hajduk Split	36	18	6	12	48	37	+11	60	Qualification for the Europa Conference League second qualifying round
5	Gorica	36	17	8	11	60	47	+13	59	

Source: PrvaHNL.hr
Rules for classification: 1) Points; 2) Head-to-head points; 3) Head-to-head goal difference; 4) Head-to-head goals scored (at home if two teams tied); 5) Goal difference; 6) Goals scored; 7) Play-off
(Note: Criteria 2-4 and 7 is only used if deciding champion, teams to international competition or teams for relegation and in that case criteria 6 will not be used).
(C) Champions

==== Results summary ====
Overall								Home						Away					
Pld	W	D	L	GF	GA	GD	Pts	W	D	L	GF	GA	GD	W	D	L	GF	GA	GD
36	26	7	3	84	28	+56	85	14	2	2	44	13	+31	12	5	1	40	15	+25

Last updated: 22 May 2021.
Source: Prva HNL

==== Results by round ====
Round	1	2	3	4	5	6	7	8	9	10	11	12	13	14	15	16	17	18	19	20	21	22	23	24	25	26	27	28	29	30	31	32	33	34	35	36
Ground	H	A	H	A	H	H	A	H	A	A	H	A	H	A	A	H	A	H	H	A	H	A	H	H	A	H	A	A	H	A	H	A	A	H	A	H
Result	W	W	W	W	D	L	W	W	W	D	W	L	W	W	D	W	W	L	W	W	W	D	W	W	W	W	D	W	W	D	W	W	W	D	W	W
Position	1	1	1	1	1	1	1	1	1	1	1	1	1	2	1	1	1	1	1	1	1	1	1	1	1	1	1	1	1	1	1	1	1	1	1	1

Updated to match(es) played on 22 May 2021. Source: Prva HNL
A = Away; H = Home; W = Win; D = Draw; L = Loss

==== Matches ====
The league fixtures were announced on 29 July 2020.

16 August 2020 1	Dinamo Zagreb	6–0	Lokomotiva	Zagreb
20:05 CEST (UTC+2)	Majer 6', 27'; Burton (yellow card) 43'; Gavranović 50'; Stojanović (yellow card) 68'; Oršić 78'; Ivanušec 79'; Andrić 89'	Report	Kolinger (yellow card) 32'; Osmanković (yellow card) 61'	Stadium: Stadion Maksimir; Attendance: 0 Referee: Fran Jović

21 August 2020 2	Istra 1961	0–1	Dinamo Zagreb	Pula
20:05 CEST (UTC+2)	Regan (yellow card) 23'; Sergi (yellow card) 75'; Páez (yellow card) 86'; Blagojević (yellow card) 86'; Tomašević (yellow card) 89'	Report	Kastrati (yellow card) 34' (yellow-red card) 57'; Petković 87' (pen.)	Stadium: Stadion Aldo Drosina; Attendance: 0 Referee: Dario Bel

30 August 2020 3	Dinamo Zagreb	4–1	Osijek	Zagreb
20:05 CEST (UTC+2)	Gavranović 5'; Ademi (yellow card) 41', (goal) 71'; Petković (yellow card) 55'; Andrić 81' (pen.); Tolić 86' (pen.)	Report	Grezda 48', (yellow card) 58'; Talys (yellow card) 83'	Stadium: Stadion Maksimir; Attendance: 0 Referee: Mario Zebec

12 September 2020 4	Hajduk Split	1–2	Dinamo Zagreb	Split
19:00 CEST (UTC+2)	Jurić 88'	Report	Stojanović (yellow card) 40'; Kastrati 42'; Oršić 50'	Stadium: Stadion Poljud; Attendance: 0 Referee: Ivan Bebek

19 September 2020 5	Dinamo Zagreb	3–3	Slaven Belupo	Zagreb
19:05 CEST (UTC+2)	Gavranović 4', 8'; Théophile-Catherine (yellow card) 32'; Majer 69'; Stojanović (yellow card) 71'; Jakić (yellow card) 76'	Report	Etoundi 1'; Krstanović 22' (pen.); Van Bruggen (yellow card) 34'; Mlinar (yellow card) 38'; Glavčić (yellow card) 66'; Knöll 73'; Zirdum (yellow card) 78' (yellow-red card) 89'	Stadium: Stadion Maksimir; Attendance: 354; Referee: Dario Kulušić

4 October 2020 7	Varaždin	1–2	Dinamo Zagreb	Varaždin
17:00 CEST (UTC+2)	Drožđek 8' (pen.); Elezi (yellow card) 19'; Stolnik (yellow card) 45+1'	Report	Lauritsen (yellow card) 6'; Leovac (yellow card) 24'; Oršić 45+1', 54'; Majer (yellow card) 90+2'	Stadium: Stadion Varteks; Attendance: 1,870; Referee: Dario Bel

17 October 2020 8	Dinamo Zagreb	3–2	Gorica	Zagreb
19:00 CEST (UTC+2)	Gavranović 32', 36', 66'; Majer (yellow card) 56'; Leovac (yellow card) 56'; Petković (yellow card) 88'	Report	Čabraja (yellow card) 11'; Suk (yellow card) 27'; Mudrinski 46'; Hamad 50'; Kalik (yellow card) 68'	Stadium: Stadion Maksimir; Attendance: 815; Referee: Ivan Bebek

25 October 2020 9	Šibenik	0–2	Dinamo Zagreb	Šibenik
15:00 CET (UTC+1)	Mesa (yellow card) 29'; Pandža (yellow card) 53'; Ćurić (yellow card) 65'	Report	Ivanušec (yellow card) 45'; Petković 54' (pen.); Stojanović (yellow card) 60'; Oršić 72'	Stadium: Stadion Šubićevac; Attendance: 1,200; Referee: Ivan Bebek

1 November 2020 10	Lokomotiva	1–1	Dinamo Zagreb	Zagreb
17:05 CET (UTC+1)	Maliqi (yellow card) 37'; Ibrahim 42'; Kolinger (yellow card) 75'	Report	Ivanušec 8'; Burton (yellow card) 40'	Stadium: Kranjčevićeva; Attendance: 0 Referee: Duje Strukan

8 November 2020 11	Dinamo Zagreb	5–0	Istra 1961	Zagreb
15:00 CET (UTC+1)	Gavranović 6', 75'; Jakić 45+1'; Oršić 76'; Tolić 87'	Report	Bosančić (yellow card) 72'	Stadium: Stadion Maksimir; Attendance: 0 Referee: Mario Zebec

21 November 2020 12	Osijek	2–0	Dinamo Zagreb	Osijek
15:00 CET (UTC+1)	Škorić (yellow card) 27'; Vuković (yellow card) 45'; Pilj 55'; Žaper 90'	Report	Théophile-Catherine (yellow card) 1'; Jakić (yellow card) 58'; Lauritsen (yellow card) 59'; Leovac (yellow card) 90+2'	Stadium: Gradski Vrt Stadium; Attendance: 0 Referee: Duje Strukan

6 December 2020 14	Slaven Belupo	1–5	Dinamo Zagreb	Koprivnica
15:00 CET (UTC+1)	Krstanović (yellow card) 31'; Goda (yellow card) 67'; Knöll 85'	Report	Gavranović 5', 16'; Stojanović (yellow card) 35'; Ivanušec (yellow card) 40', (goal) 90+5'; Petković 78'; Tolić (yellow card) 90+3'; Hajrović 90+4'	Stadium: Gradski stadion Attendance: 0 Referee: Mario Zebec

13 December 2020 15	Rijeka	2–2	Dinamo Zagreb	Rijeka
17:05 CET (UTC+1)	Smolčić (yellow card) 7'; Galović 28', (yellow card) 44'; Menalo 35'; Murić (yellow card) 51'; Capan (yellow card) 51'; Tomečak (yellow card) 80'	Report	Ivanušec 1'; Gavranović (yellow card) 44'; Lauritsen 82'	Stadium: Stadion Rujevica; Attendance: 0 Referee: Mario Zebec

19 December 2020 16	Dinamo Zagreb	4–0	Varaždin	Zagreb
17:05 CET (UTC+1)	Oršić 23'; Petković 31', 79' (pen.); Mišić (yellow card) 82'; Hajrović 90+1'	Report	Đurasek (yellow card) 71'	Stadium: Stadion Maksimir; Attendance: 0 Referee: Dario Kulušić

19 January 2021 6	Dinamo Zagreb	0–2	Rijeka	Zagreb
18:05 CET (UTC+1)	Ivanušec (yellow card) 26'; Petković (penalty missed) 53'; Leovac (yellow card) 59'	Report	Galović (yellow card) 22'; Štefulj (yellow card) 58'; Lončar 66'; Andrijašević 71'; Smolčić (yellow card) 75'; Capan (yellow card) 89'; Pavičić (yellow card) 90+1'	Stadium: Stadion Maksimir; Attendance: 0 Referee: Duje Strukan

23 January 2021 17	Gorica	3–4	Dinamo Zagreb	Velika Gorica
17:05 CET (UTC+1)	Dieye 11', (yellow card) 78'; Lovrić 43'; Špikić (yellow card) 52', (goal) 61'; Muhammed (yellow card) 88'; Banić (yellow card) 88'	Report	Ivanušec 34'; Oršić 41'; Petković 89' (pen.); Théophile-Catherine 90+5'	Stadium: Stadion Radnik; Attendance: 0 Referee: Mario Zebec

27 January 2021 13	Dinamo Zagreb	3–1	Hajduk Split	Zagreb
17:05 CET (UTC+1)	Oršić 16', 18'; Franjić (yellow card) 48'; Perić (yellow card) 78'; Majer 83'; Lauritsen (yellow card) 87'	Report	Vušković 6'; Jradi (yellow card) 24'; Jakoliš (yellow card) 49'; Jurić (yellow card) 75'	Stadium: Stadion Maksimir; Attendance: 0 Referee: Mario Zebec
Note: The match originally scheduled for 29 November 2020, but postponed due to Dinamo Zagreb's involvement in the Europa League.

30 January 2021 18	Dinamo Zagreb	1–2	Šibenik	Zagreb
17:05 CET (UTC+1)	Atiemwen (yellow card) 5', (goal) 22'	Report	Bulat (yellow card) 2'; Sahiti 13'; Mesa (yellow card) 23'; Jurić 65', (yellow card) 65'; Schildenfeld (yellow card) 80'	Stadium: Stadion Maksimir; Attendance: 0 Referee: Dario Bel

2 February 2021 19	Dinamo Zagreb	2–0	Lokomotiva	Zagreb
18:05 CET (UTC+1)	Gavranović 9'; Atiemwen 64'; Théophile-Catherine (yellow card) 86'	Report	Papadopoulos (yellow card) 9'; Marić (yellow card) 13'; Malikji (yellow card) 26'; Çokaj (yellow card) 38'; Marković (yellow card) 87'	Stadium: Stadion Maksimir; Attendance: 0 Referee: Marin Vidulin

7 February 2021 20	Istra 1961	0–1	Dinamo Zagreb	Pula
17:05 CET (UTC+1)	Tomašević (yellow card) 46'; Perera (yellow card) 56'; Šutalo (yellow card) 81'	Report	Jakić (yellow card) 35'; Atiemwen 36'	Stadium: Stadion Aldo Drosina; Attendance: 0 Referee: Zdenko Lovrić

13 February 2021 21	Dinamo Zagreb	1–0	Osijek	Zagreb
17:05 CET (UTC+1)	Oršić 15'; Ristovski (yellow card) 72' (yellow-red card) 77'; Petković (yellow card) 90+1'	Report	Vuković (yellow card) 27'; Kleinheisler (yellow card) 70'; Bočkaj (yellow card) 75'; Miérez (yellow card) 89'; Guti (yellow card) 90+2'	Stadium: Stadion Maksimir; Attendance: 0 Referee: Ivan Bebek

28 February 2021 23	Dinamo Zagreb	3–0	Slaven Belupo	Zagreb
17:05 CET (UTC+1)	Stojanović (yellow card) 50'; Gvardiol 60'; Tolić 64'; Gavranović 90'	Report	Kim Hyun-woo (yellow card) 31'; Gamarra (yellow card) 44'; Bogojević (yellow card) 54'; Petričić (yellow card) 79'	Stadium: Stadion Maksimir; Attendance: 0 Referee: Marin Vidulin

7 March 2021 24	Dinamo Zagreb	2–0	Rijeka	Zagreb
17:30 CET (UTC+1)	Ivanušec 27'; Oršić 65'	Report	Vukčević (yellow card) 64'; Andrijašević (yellow card) 72'; Drmić (yellow card) 78'; Galović (yellow card) 90'	Stadium: Stadion Maksimir; Attendance: 0 Referee: Duje Strukan

14 March 2021 25	Varaždin	0–5	Dinamo Zagreb	Varaždin
15:00 CET (UTC+1)	Senić (yellow card) 32'	Report	Atiemwen 7'; Mišić 16'; Gavranović 24'; Franjić (yellow card) 67'; Oršić 70', 78'	Stadium: Stadion Varteks; Attendance: 0 Referee: Ivan Bebek

21 March 2021 26	Dinamo Zagreb	1–0	Gorica	Zagreb
17:30 CET (UTC+1)	Petković (yellow card) 19', (goal) 47'; Čabraja (yellow card) 50'; Mišić (yellow card) 90+4'	Report	Muhammed (yellow card) 13'; Dvorneković (yellow card) 68'; Dieye (yellow card) 71'; Babec (yellow card) 79'	Stadium: Stadion Maksimir; Attendance: 0 Referee: Dario Kulušić

3 April 2021 27	Šibenik	1–1	Dinamo Zagreb	Šibenik
19:00 CEST (UTC+2)	Pajić (yellow card) 47'; Martín (yellow card) 51'; Juric (yellow card) 53'; Mesa 77'; Ampem (yellow card) 79'; Rogić (yellow card) 90'	Report	Gavranović (yellow card) 4'; Stojanović (yellow card) 48'; Majer 70'; Hajrović (yellow card) 90'	Stadium: Stadion Šubićevac; Attendance: 0 Referee: Mario Zebec

11 April 2021 28	Lokomotiva	0–2	Dinamo Zagreb	Zagreb
19:10 CEST (UTC+2)	Maleš (yellow card) 47'	Report	Gvardiol 30'; Atiemwen 70'; Ivanušec (yellow card) 81'	Stadium: Kranjčevićeva; Attendance: 0 Referee: Fran Jović

18 April 2021 29	Dinamo Zagreb	1–0	Istra 1961	Zagreb
19:05 CEST (UTC+2)	Petković 38' (pen.); Gavranović (yellow card) 60'; Stojanović (yellow card) 80'; Burton (red card) 84'	Report	Galilea (yellow card) 37'; Blagojević (yellow card) 69'; Gržan (yellow card) 80'	Stadium: Stadion Maksimir; Attendance: 0 Referee: Igor Pajač

21 April 2021 30	Osijek	1–1	Dinamo Zagreb	Osijek
20:30 CEST (UTC+2)	Igor Silva (yellow card) 36'; Kleinheisler (yellow card) 59'; Žaper (yellow card) 60'; Erceg 64'; Cheberko (yellow card) 65'	Report	Majer 5', (yellow card) 78'; Ristovski (yellow card) 24'; Ademi (yellow card) 56'; Petković (yellow card) 90'; Lauritsen (yellow card) 90+3'	Stadium: Gradski Vrt Stadium; Attendance: 0 Referee: Mario Zebec

25 April 2021 31	Dinamo Zagreb	2–0	Hajduk Split	Zagreb
20:00 CEST (UTC+2)	Petković 21' (pen.), (yellow card) 71'; Kastrati 35'; Franjić (yellow card) 39'	Report	Simić (yellow card) 45'; Jurić (yellow card) 90+3'	Stadium: Stadion Maksimir; Attendance: 0 Referee: Ivan Bebek

1 May 2021 32	Slaven Belupo	0–2	Dinamo Zagreb	Koprivnica
17:00 CEST (UTC+2)	Goda (yellow card) 21'; Čović (yellow card) 22'; Mlinar (yellow card) 75'; Božić (yellow card) 90+4'	Report	Tolić 64'; Kastrati (yellow card) 82'; Oršić 86'	Stadium: Gradski stadion Attendance: 0 Referee: Igor Pajač

5 May 2021 22	Hajduk Split	1–1	Dinamo Zagreb	Split
18:00 CEST (UTC+2)	Livaja 44'; Simić (yellow card) 59'; Fossati (yellow card) 69'	Report	Majer 16'; Jakić (yellow card) 25'; Lauritsen (yellow card) 66'	Stadium: Stadion Poljud; Attendance: 0 Referee: Igor Pajač
Note: The match was originally scheduled for 21 February 2021, but was postponed after more than ten Hajduk players tested positive for COVID-19.

9 May 2021 33	Rijeka	1–5	Dinamo Zagreb	Rijeka
19:00 CEST (UTC+2)	Menalo 1'; Murić (yellow card) 59'; Capan (yellow card) 79'	Report	Galović 43' (o.g.); Mišić 48', (yellow card) 57'; Capan 49' (o.g.); Oršić 64'; Vukčević 88' (o.g.)	Stadium: Stadion Rujevica; Attendance: 0 Referee: Duje Strukan

12 May 2021 34	Dinamo Zagreb	2–2	Varaždin	Zagreb
18:05 CEST (UTC+2)	Ivanušec 9'; Perić 40'; Tolić (yellow card) 72'; Čabraja (yellow card) 80'	Report	Elezi (yellow card) 32', (goal) 34'; Herrera 59'; Novoselec (yellow card) 67'; Senić (yellow card) 77'; Pëllumbi (yellow card) 80'; Zelenika (yellow card) 90+3'	Stadium: Stadion Maksimir; Attendance: 0 Referee: Dario Kulušić

16 May 2021 35	Gorica	0–3	Dinamo Zagreb	Velika Gorica
19:10 CEST (UTC+2)	Lovrić (penalty missed) 87'	Report	Gavranović 3', 36', 90+3'; Baturina (yellow card) 90+2'	Stadium: Stadion Radnik; Attendance: 0 Referee: Dario Bel

22 May 2021 36	Dinamo Zagreb	1–0	Šibenik	Zagreb
18:00 CEST (UTC+2)	Tolić (yellow card) 30'; Jakić (yellow card) 58'; Milić 88'	Report		Stadium: Stadion Maksimir; Attendance: 0 Referee: Mario Zebec

=== Croatian Football Cup ===
26 September 2020 First round	Ferdinandovac	1–7	Dinamo Zagreb	Ferdinandovac
15:00 CEST (UTC+2)	Begović (yellow card) 23'; Križanović 37'	Report	Gojak 13'; Ivanušec 28'; Andrić 56', 83'; Menalo 60', 68', 88'	Stadium: Stadion Ferdinandovac; Attendance: 2,000; Referee: Dario Bel

16 December 2020 Second round	Rudeš	0–2	Dinamo Zagreb	Zagreb
13:00 CET (UTC+1)	Šehić (yellow card) 42'; Grgić (red card) 90'	Report	Hajrović 61'; Burton (yellow card) 76'; Perić 90+3'	Stadium: Igralište NK Rudeš; Attendance: 0 Referee: Ante Čuljak

3 March 2021 Quarter-finals	Dinamo Zagreb	2–0	Slaven Belupo	Zagreb
17:00 CET (UTC+1)	Petković 70' (pen.); Ademi 78'	Report	Bosec (yellow card) 24'; Knöll (yellow card) 82'	Stadium: Stadion Maksimir; Attendance: 0 Referee: Ivan Bebek

28 April 2021 Semi-finals	Dinamo Zagreb	4–1 (a.e.t.)	Gorica	Zagreb
18:00 CEST (UTC+2)	Mišić 47', (yellow card) 77'; Kastrati (yellow card) 89'; Jakić 100'; Majer 110'; Ademi 119'	Report	Špikić 3'; Krizmanić (yellow card) 13'; Keita (yellow card) 26' (yellow-red card) 48'; Pršir (yellow card) 86'	Stadium: Stadion Maksimir; Attendance: 0 Referee: Mario Zebec

19 May 2021 Final	Dinamo Zagreb	6–3	Istra 1961	Velika Gorica
20:00 CEST (UTC+2)	Oršić 5', 74'; Ademi 9', (yellow card) 61'; Jakić (yellow card) 18'; Majer 33'; Šutalo 59' (o.g.); Théophile-Catherine (yellow card) 79'; Gavranović 84'	Report	Hara 52', 53'; Galilea (yellow card) 56'; Gržan 64' (pen.), (yellow card) 80'; Perera (yellow card) 81'	Stadium: Stadion Radnik; Attendance: 0 Referee: Duje Strukan

=== UEFA Champions League ===
26 August 2020 Second qualifying round	CFR Cluj (Romania)	2–2 (a.e.t.) (5–6 p)	(Croatia) Dinamo Zagreb	Cluj-Napoca, Romania
20:00 CEST (UTC+2)	Pereira 64'; Bălgrădean (yellow card) 79'; Đoković (yellow card) 86'; Debeljuh (yellow card) 89', (goal) 90+3'; Burcă (yellow card) 90+3'; Bordeianu (yellow card) 92'; Rondón (yellow card) 115'	Report	Gojak 14'; Ademi (yellow card) 44'; Théophile-Catherine (red card) 51'; Kastrati 78', (yellow card) 119'; Leovac (yellow card) 82'; Livaković (yellow card) 90+2'; Petković (yellow card) 101'	Stadium: Stadionul Dr. Constantin Rădulescu; Attendance: 0 Referee: António Nobre (Portugal)
	Penalties
	Vinícius (penalty scored); Đoković (penalty scored); Rondón (penalty scored); Sušić (penalty scored); Golofca (penalty missed); Deac (penalty scored); Boli (penalty missed)		(penalty scored) Petković; (penalty scored) Leovac; (penalty scored) Ademi; (penalty scored) Stojanović; (penalty missed) Gojak; (penalty scored) Dilaver; (penalty scored) Gvardiol

16 September 2020 Third qualifying round	Ferencváros (Hungary)	2–1	(Croatia) Dinamo Zagreb	Budapest, Hungary
19:00 CEST (UTC+2)	Lovrencsics 2'; Uzuni 65'; Boli (yellow card) 67'; Nguen (yellow card) 78'; Frimpong (yellow card) 79'; Ćivić (yellow card) 87'	Report	Uzuni 23' (o.g.); Gojak (yellow card) 61'; Jakić (yellow card) 81'; Petković (yellow card) 81'	Stadium: Groupama Arena; Attendance: 0 Referee: Tobias Stieler (Germany)

=== UEFA Europa League ===
==== Qualifying rounds ====
1 October 2020 Play-off round	Dinamo Zagreb (Croatia)	3–1	(Estonia) Flora	Zagreb, Croatia
19:00 CEST (UTC+2)	Gavranović 11'; Ademi 26', 87'; Leovac (yellow card) 90+3'	Report	Sinyavskiy 65'	Stadium: Stadion Maksimir; Attendance: 0 Referee: Ali Palabıyık (Turkey)

==== Group stage ====
The group stage draw was held on 2 October 2020.

Pos	Team	Pld	W	D	L	GF	GA	GD	Pts	Qualification	DZG	WAC	FEY	CSM
1	(Croatia) Dinamo Zagreb	6	4	2	0	9	1	+8	14	Advance to knockout phase	—	1–0	0–0	3–1
2	(Austria) Wolfsberger AC	6	3	1	2	7	6	+1	10	Advance to knockout phase	0–3	—	1–0	1–1
3	(Netherlands) Feyenoord	6	1	2	3	4	8	−4	5		0–2	1–4	—	3–1
4	(Russia) CSKA Moscow	6	0	3	3	3	8	−5	3		0–0	0–1	0–0	—

Source: UEFA
Rules for classification: Group stage tiebreakers

22 October 2020 1	Dinamo Zagreb (Croatia)	0–0	(Netherlands) Feyenoord	Zagreb, Croatia
21:00 CEST (UTC+2)	Kastrati (yellow card) 32'; Petković (yellow card) 77'	Report	Senesi (yellow card) 61' (yellow-red card) 73'; Nieuwkoop (yellow card) 84'; Teixeira (yellow card) 90+3'	Stadium: Stadion Maksimir; Attendance: 1,271; Referee: Mattias Gestranius (Finland)

29 October 2020 2	CSKA Moscow (Russia)	0–0	(Croatia) Dinamo Zagreb	Moscow, Russia
18:55 CET (UTC+1)		Report	Petković (yellow card) 61'; Jakić (yellow card) 90+1'	Stadium: VEB Arena; Attendance: 6,411; Referee: Radu Petrescu (Romania)

5 November 2020 3	Dinamo Zagreb (Croatia)	1–0	(Austria) Wolfsberger AC	Zagreb, Croatia
21:00 CET (UTC+1)	Leovac (yellow card) 55'; Franjić (yellow card) 66'; Majer (yellow card) 71'; Atiemwen 76'	Report	Taferner (yellow card) 14' (yellow-red card) 45'; Baumgartner (yellow card) 25'; Wernitznig (yellow card) 36'; Dieng (yellow card) 47'; Pavelić (yellow card) 68'; Hodzić (yellow card) 89'	Stadium: Stadion Maksimir; Attendance: 0 Referee: Jérôme Brisard (France)

26 November 2020 4	Wolfsberger AC (Austria)	0–3	(Croatia) Dinamo Zagreb	Klagenfurt, Austria
18:55 CET (UTC+1)	Leitgeb (yellow card) 44'; Scherzer (yellow card) 59'; Novak (yellow card) 83'	Report	Majer 60'; Petković 75'; Ivanušec 90+1'	Stadium: Wörthersee Stadion; Attendance: 0 Referee: Serhiy Boyko (Ukraine)

3 December 2020 5	Feyenoord (Netherlands)	0–2	(Croatia) Dinamo Zagreb	Rotterdam, Netherlands
18:55 CET (UTC+1)	Spajić (yellow card) 23'; Toornstra (yellow card) 43'; Malacia (yellow card) 46'; Geertruida (yellow card) 50'; Berghuis (yellow card) 82'; Senesi (yellow card) 90+1'	Report	Théophile-Catherine (yellow card) 24'; Petković 45+5' (pen.), (yellow card) 86'; Majer 53'	Stadium: De Kuip; Attendance: 0 Referee: Chris Kavanagh (England)

10 December 2020 6	Dinamo Zagreb (Croatia)	3–1	(Russia) CSKA Moscow	Zagreb, Croatia
21:00 CET (UTC+1)	Gavranović (yellow card) 2'; Gvardiol 25'; Oršić 41'; Kastrati 75'; Franjić (yellow card) 81'	Report	Oblyakov (yellow card) 41'; Vasin (yellow card) 51'; Bistrović 76'; Gaich (yellow card) 85'	Stadium: Stadion Maksimir; Attendance: 0 Referee: Tiago Martins (Portugal)

==== Knockout phase ====
===== Round of 32 =====
The draw for the round of 32 was held on 14 December 2020.

18 February 2021 First leg	Krasnodar (Russia)	2–3	(Croatia) Dinamo Zagreb	Krasnodar, Russia
18:55 CET (UTC+1)	Berg 28'; Claesson 69'	Report	Petković 15', 54'; Atiemwen 75'; Franjić (yellow card) 90'	Stadium: Krasnodar Stadium; Attendance: 9,897; Referee: Bartosz Frankowski (Poland)

25 February 2021 Second leg	Dinamo Zagreb (Croatia)	1–0 (4–2 agg.)	(Russia) Krasnodar	Zagreb, Croatia
21:00 CET (UTC+1)	Oršić 31'; Majer (yellow card) 60'	Report	Vilhena (yellow card) 42'	Stadium: Stadion Maksimir; Attendance: 0 Referee: Halil Umut Meler (Turkey)

===== Round of 16 =====
The draw for the round of 16 was held on 26 February 2021. The order of legs was reversed after the original draw to avoid a scheduling conflict with the Arsenal v Olympiacos second leg in the same city on 18 March, as Arsenal were the domestic cup winners and given higher priority over Tottenham.

11 March 2021 First leg	Tottenham Hotspur (England)	2–0	(Croatia) Dinamo Zagreb	Tottenham, England
20:00 GMT (UTC±0)	Kane 25', 70'; Dier (yellow card) 45+2'; Sánchez (yellow card) 79'; Højbjerg (yellow card) 85'	Report	Ademi (yellow card) 69'; Ivanušec (yellow card) 77'; Ristovski (yellow card) 88'	Stadium: Tottenham Hotspur Stadium; Attendance: 0 Referee: Serdar Gözübüyük (Netherlands)

18 March 2021 Second leg	Dinamo Zagreb (Croatia)	3–0 (a.e.t.) (3–2 agg.)	(England) Tottenham Hotspur	Zagreb, Croatia
18:55 CET (UTC+1)	Jakić (yellow card) 32'; Oršić 62', 83', 106'; Lauritsen (yellow card) 80'; Stojanović (yellow card) 90+3'	Report	Lamela (yellow card) 22'	Stadium: Stadion Maksimir; Attendance: 0 Referee: Davide Massa (Italy)

===== Quarter-finals =====
The draw for the quarter-finals was held on 19 March 2021.

8 April 2021 First leg	Dinamo Zagreb (Croatia)	0–1	(Spain) Villarreal	Zagreb, Croatia
21:00 CEST (UTC+2)		Report	Gerard 44' (pen.), (yellow card) 76'	Stadium: Stadion Maksimir; Attendance: 0 Referee: Daniel Siebert (Germany)

15 April 2021 Second leg	Villarreal (Spain)	2–1 (3–1 agg.)	(Croatia) Dinamo Zagreb	Villarreal, Spain
21:00 CEST (UTC+2)	Alcácer 36'; Gerard 43'; Trigueros (yellow card) 60'	Report	Jakić (yellow card) 40'; Oršić 74'	Stadium: Estadio de la Cerámica; Attendance: 0 Referee: Danny Makkelie (Netherlands)

== Statistics ==
=== Goalscorers ===
As of 22 May 2021

Rank	No.	Pos	Nat	Name	Prva HNL	Croatian Cup	Champions League	Europa League	Total
1	99	FW	(Croatia)	Mislav Oršić	16	2	0	6	24
2	11	FW	(Switzerland)	Mario Gavranović	17	1	0	1	19
3	21	FW	(Croatia)	Bruno Petković	9	1	0	4	14
4	10	MF	(Croatia)	Lovro Majer	7	2	0	2	11
5	17	MF	(Croatia)	Luka Ivanušec	7	1	0	1	9
6	80	FW	(Nigeria)	Iyayi Atiemwen	5	0	0	2	7
7	5	MF	(North Macedonia)	Arijan Ademi	1	3	0	2	6
8	9	FW	(Serbia)	Komnen Andrić	2	2	0	0	4
8	20	FW	(Kosovo)	Lirim Kastrati	2	0	1	1	4
8	24	MF	(Croatia)	Marko Tolić	4	0	0	0	4
11	8	FW	(Bosnia and Herzegovina)	Izet Hajrović	2	1	0	0	3
11	23	FW	(Bosnia and Herzegovina)	Luka Menalo	0	3	0	0	3
11	27	MF	(Croatia)	Josip Mišić	2	1	0	0	3
11	32	DF	(Croatia)	Joško Gvardiol	2	0	0	1	3
15	14	MF	(Bosnia and Herzegovina)	Amer Gojak	0	1	1	0	2
15	55	DF	(Croatia)	Dino Perić	1	1	0	0	2
15	97	MF	(Croatia)	Kristijan Jakić	1	1	0	0	2
18	4	DF	(Montenegro)	Stefan Milić	1	0	0	0	1
18	6	DF	(Denmark)	Rasmus Lauritsen	1	0	0	0	1
18	28	DF	(France)	Kévin Théophile-Catherine	1	0	0	0	1
Own goals					3	1	1	0	5
Totals					84	21	3	20	128
