= Iličić =

Iličić is a surname. Notable people with the surname include:

- Josip Iličić (born 1988), Slovenian football player of Bosnian Croat descent
- Miroslav Iličić (born 1998), Croatian football player

== See also ==
- Ilinčić
