= Lirim Kastrati (footballer, born January 1999) =

Kosovan footballer

Personal information
- Full name: Lirim M. Kastrati
- Date of birth: 16 January 1999 (age 27)
- Place of birth: Hogosht, FR Yugoslavia
- Height: 1.76 m (5 ft 9 in)
- Position: Winger

Team information
- Current team: Vllaznia Shkodër
- Number: 7

Youth career
- 2011–2013: Kika
- 2013–2014: Dardana
- 2014–2017: Shkëndija Tiranë
- 2017–2018: Lokomotiva

Senior career*
Years	Team	Apps	(Gls)
2017–2020	Lokomotiva	80	(21)
2020–2021	Dinamo Zagreb	32	(2)
2021–2022	Legia Warsaw	16	(0)
2022–2024	Fehérvár	49	(9)
2024	→ Lokomotiva (loan)	9	(0)
2025–	Vllaznia Shkodër	32	(3)

International career^{‡}
2017–2018	Kosovo U19	5	(0)
2017–2020	Kosovo U21	7	(1)
2018–	Kosovo	17	(1)
- * Club domestic league appearances and goals as of 24 June 2026 ‡ National team caps and goals as of 12 October 2021

Lirim M. Kastrati (born 16 January 1999) is a Kosovan professional footballer who plays as a winger for Albanian club Vllaznia Shkodër, and the Kosovo national team.

== Club career ==
=== Lokomotiva ===
On 17 February 2018, Kastrati made his debut as a professional footballer in a 1–0 away defeat against Istra 1961 after being named in the starting line-up. On 10 March 2018, he scored his first two goals in a 4–1 away win over Dinamo Zagreb. On 16 September 2018, Kastrati scored the first hat-trick of his career in a 5–2 away win over Slaven Belupo. On 17 February 2020, Kastrati signed a five-year contract with Dinamo Zagreb. He was sent back on loan to Lokomotiva for the remainder of the season. Four days later, he played the first game after the return against Varaždin after being named in the starting line-up.

=== Dinamo Zagreb ===
On 5 August 2020, Kastrati returned to Dinamo Zagreb. His debut with Dinamo Zagreb came eleven days later in a 6–0 home win against his former club Lokomotiva after being named in the starting line-up. Five days after debut, Kastrati was sent off in a 0–1 away win against Istra 1961 after a rough tackle on Obeng Regan. On 26 August, he scored his first goal for Dinamo Zagreb in his third appearance for the club in a 2–2 away draw over CFR Cluj in Champions League qualifying, which Dinamo Zagreb won 6–5 after penalty shootout and progressed to the third qualifying round.

On 12 September, Kastrati scored his first league goal in the Eternal derby as Dinamo Zagreb defeated Hajduk Split 2–1 at Stadion Poljud. On 22 October, he made his debut in a UEFA competition in the Europa League against Feyenoord after being named in the starting line-up. On 10 December, he scored his first European goal for Dinamo Zagreb in a 3–1 home win over CSKA Moscow.

During the second half of the season, Kastrati's inefficiency forced coach Zoran Mamić and his successor Damir Krznar to drop him from the starting XI. On 25 April 2021, Krznar unexpectedly named Kastrati in the starting XI for another Eternal derby, this time at Stadion Maksimir, which ended as a 2–0 victory with Kastrati scoring the second goal. After the game, Kastrati and Hajduk's coach Paolo Tramezzani were a subject of controversy after Kastrati was seen giving Tramezzani his shirt.

=== Legia Warsaw ===
On 1 September 2021, Kastrati joined Ekstraklasa side Legia Warsaw. In same day later, the club confirmed that he had joined on a four-year contract and received squad number 7. His debut with Legia Warsaw came ten days later in a 1–0 away defeat against Śląsk Wrocław after coming on as a substitute at 46th minute in place of Kacper Skibicki. On 15 September 2021, he scored his first goal for Legia Warsaw in his second appearance for the club in a 1–0 away win over Spartak Moscow in UEFA Europa League.

=== Fehérvár ===
On 29 August 2022, Kastrati signed a three-year contract with Nemzeti Bajnokság I club Fehérvár and received squad number 10. His debut with Fehérvár came two days later in a 2–1 home win against Kecskemét after coming on as a substitute at 66th minute in place of Funsho Bamgboye.

== International career ==
=== Under-19 ===
On 1 October 2017, Kastrati was named as part of the Kosovo U19 squad for 2018 UEFA European Under-19 Championship qualifications. On 3 October 2017, he made his debut with Kosovo U19 in a match against Austria U19 after being named in the starting line-up.

=== Under-21 ===
On 6 November 2017, Kastrati received a call-up from Kosovo U21 for 2019 UEFA European Under-21 Championship qualification matches against Israel U21 and Azerbaijan U21. On 14 November 2017, he made his debut with Kosovo U21 in a match against Azerbaijan U21 after coming on as a substitute at 46th minute in place of Mirlind Daku.

=== Senior ===
On 5 October 2018, Kastrati received a call-up from Kosovo for the 2018–19 UEFA Nations League matches against Malta and Faroe Islands. On 11 October 2018, he made his debut with Kosovo in a match against Malta after coming on as a substitute at 83rd minute in place of Vedat Muriqi. He scored his debut goal and the only goal in the 2020–21 UEFA Nations League victory over Moldova on 18 November 2020, saving Kosovo from relegation to League D.

== Personal life ==
Kastrati was born in Hogosht, Kamenica, FR Yugoslavia (present-day Kosovo) to Kosovo Albanian parents. He is in a relationship with Croatian model Anđela Šimac, with whom he has a daughter Indiah.

== Career statistics ==
=== Club ===
As of 31 August 2022

Appearances and goals by club, season and competition
Club	Season	League			National cup (Note: Includes Croatian Cup, Polish Cup)		Continental		Total	
Club	Season	Division	Apps	Goals	Apps	Goals	Apps	Goals	Apps	Goals
Lokomotiva	2017–18	Croatian First League	14	3	1	0	—		15	3
Lokomotiva	2018–19	Croatian First League	32	7	3	0	—		35	7
Lokomotiva	2019–20	Croatian First League	34	11	5	0	—		39	11
Lokomotiva	Total		80	21	9	0	—		89	21
Dinamo Zagreb	2020–21	Croatian First League	27	2	3	0	11 (Note: Two appearances and one goal in UEFA Champions League, nine appearances and one goal in UEFA Europa League)	2	41	4
Dinamo Zagreb	2021–22	Croatian First League	5	0	0	0	5 (Note: Appearances in UEFA Champions League)	0	10	0
Dinamo Zagreb	Total		32	2	3	0	16	2	51	4
Legia Warsaw	2021–22	Ekstraklasa	15	0	3	1	5 (Note: Appearances in UEFA Europa League)	1	23	2
Legia Warsaw	2022–23	Ekstraklasa	1	0	—		—		1	0
Legia Warsaw	Total		16	0	3	1	5	1	24	2
Fehérvár	2022–23	Nemzeti Bajnokság I	1	0	0	0	—		1	0
Career total			129	23	15	1	21	3	165	27

=== International ===
As of 12 October 2021

Appearances and goals by national team and year
National team	Year	Apps	Goals
Kosovo	2018	1	0
Kosovo	2019	2	0
Kosovo	2020	6	1
Kosovo	2021	8	0
Total		17	1

==== International goals ====
As of 18 November 2020
Scores and results list Kosovo's goal tally first.

No.	Date	Venue	Opponent	Score	Result	Competition	Ref.
1	18 November 2020	Fadil Vokrri Stadium, Pristina, Kosovo	Moldova	1–0	1–0	2020–21 UEFA Nations League C3	
2	16 November 2022	Fadil Vokrri Stadium, Pristina, Kosovo	Armenia	2–2	2–2	Friendly	

== Honours ==
Dinamo Zagreb

- Prva HNL: 2020–21
- Croatian Cup: 2020–21
