= Ilinčić =

Ilinčić is a Serbian surname (Serbian Cyrillic: Илинчић). Notable people with the surname include:

- Roksanda Ilinčić (born 1975), Serbian fashion designer
- Zlatko Ilinčić (born 1968), Serbian chess grandmaster

== See also ==
- Iličić
