= Gonzalo Collao =

Chilean footballer (born 1997)

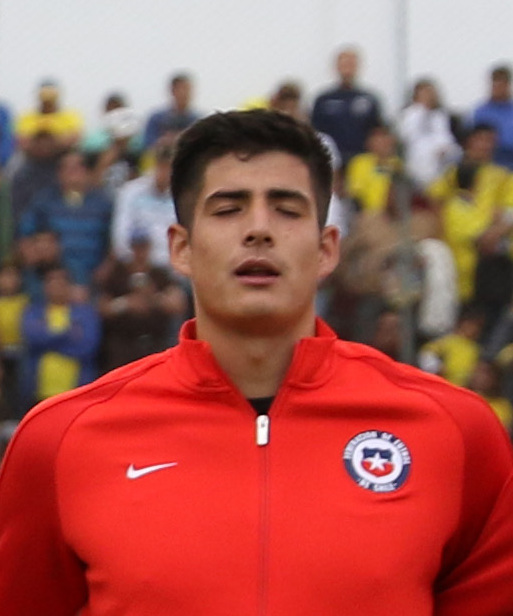
- Collao lining up with Chile U20 in 2017

Personal information
- Full name: Gonzalo Antonio Collao Villegas
- Date of birth: 9 September 1997 (age 29)
- Place of birth: Coquimbo, Chile
- Position: Goalkeeper

Team information
- Current team: Deportes Puerto Montt
- Number: 29

Youth career
- Coquimbo Unido
- 2012–2016: Universidad de Chile

Senior career*
Years	Team	Apps	(Gls)
2017–2019	Universidad de Chile	0	(0)
2018	→ Cobreloa (loan)	8	(0)
2020–2021	Extremadura B	25	(0)
2020–2021	Extremadura	3	(0)
2021–2022	Istra 1961	5	(0)
2023	Palestino	4	(0)
2024–2025	Audax Italiano	3	(0)
2026–	Deportes Puerto Montt	1	(0)

International career
2017	Chile U20	4	(0)
2018	Chile	1	(0)
- * Club domestic league appearances and goals as of 23 February 2026

Gonzalo Antonio Collao Villegas (born 9 September 1997) is a Chilean professional footballer who plays as a goalkeeper for Deportes Puerto Montt.

== Club career ==
Born in Coquimbo, Collao joined Universidad de Chile's youth setup at the age of 14, from Coquimbo Unido. He was promoted to the first team ahead of the 2017 season, and made his senior debut on 22 July of that year by coming on as a substitute for injured Fernando de Paul in a 2–0 Copa Chile win against Ñublense.

In January 2018, Collao joined Cobreloa in Primera B on loan for one year. He returned to his parent club in the following year, after making eight appearances.

On 26 August 2019, Collao agreed to a deal with Segunda División side Extremadura UD on a free transfer, effective as of 1 January 2020; he was initially assigned to the reserves in Tercera División. On 24 January 2020 he joined the Spanish club.

On 10 July 2021, he moved to Istra 1961 in the Croatian Prva HNL on a deal for three seasons.

At the end of 2022, he returned to his homeland and joined Palestino for the 2023 season. However, he ended it in July of the same year. The next year, he joined Audax Italiano.

On 30 December 2025, Collao joined Deportes Puerto Montt for the 2026 season.

== International career ==
Collao represented Chile at under-20 level before being called up for the full side on 14 March 2018, for two friendlies against Denmark and Sweden. He made his full international debut on 31 May, in a 3–2 friendly loss against Romania.

== Personal life ==
In the second half of 2023, Collao started to study nutrition and health, not retiring from football at the time.
