= Robbie Burton (footballer) =

Welsh footballer (born 1999)

Personal information
- Date of birth: 26 December 1999 (age 26)
- Place of birth: Gravesend, England
- Height: 1.76 m (5 ft 9 in)
- Position: Midfielder

Youth career
- Teviot Rangers
- 2006–2020: Arsenal

Senior career*
| Years | Team | Apps | (Gls) |
| 2020–2023 | Dinamo Zagreb II | 10 | (0) |
| 2020–2023 | Dinamo Zagreb | 14 | (0) |
| 2021 | → Istra 1961 (loan) | 1 | (0) |
| 2022 | → Sligo Rovers (loan) | 12 | (0) |
| 2023 | Sligo Rovers | 7 | (0) |

International career^{‡}
- Wales U16
| 2015–2016 | Wales U17 | 4 | (0) |
- Wales U19
| 2019–2020 | Wales U21 | 7 | (0) |
- * Club domestic league appearances and goals as of 12:23, 29 November 2023 (UTC) ‡ National team caps and goals as of 14:43, 3 December 2019 (UTC)

Robbie Burton (born 26 December 1999) is a professional footballer who plays as a midfielder, most recently for Sligo Rovers in the League of Ireland Premier Division.

Born in England, he represented Wales at youth international level.

== Early and personal life ==
Burton was born in Gravesend. He grew up near Welling, and was raised by his grandparents.

== Club career ==
Burton began his career with Teviot Rangers, signing for Arsenal at the age of 6. He turned professional in summer 2018. He became captain of the Arsenal under-23 team for the 2019–20 season.

In February 2020 he moved to Croatian club Dinamo Zagreb, playing initially for their second team in the Druga HNL.

The transfer was reportedly worth up to £800,000. He made two appearances for Dinamo Zagreb II in Druga HNL, against Hrvatski Dragovoljac and Sesvete on 28 February and 8 March respectively, getting sent off during the latter match. Following a good performance in a 3–0 friendly win over Celje on 8 August, coach Zoran Mamić decided to give Burton a chance in the first team. He made his Prva HNL debut on 16 August 2020 in a 6–0 win over Lokomotiva. On 5 November 2020, he made his European debut for Dinamo in the 1–0 Europa League victory over Wolfsberg.

On 21 August 2021, Burton was loaned out to Istra 1961 until the end of the season.

In July 2022, he signed for League of Ireland Premier Division club Sligo Rovers on loan until the end of their season. He made his debut on 31 July 2022, coming off the bench in a 2–1 FAI Cup defeat at home to Wexford.

In January 2023, Burton parted ways with Dinamo Zagreb.

Burton returned to Sligo Rovers on a permanent basis on 25 August 2023, after 8 months without a club. He made 7 appearances for the club before being released at the end of the season.

== International career ==
Burton was eligible for Wales through his Welsh grandfather, and played for them at under-16, under-17 and under-19 youth level, before progressing to under-21.

== Career statistics ==
As of match played 28 October 2023

Appearances and goals by club, season and competition
| Club | Season | League | | | National Cup (Note: Includes appearances in Croatian Cup & FAI Cup) | | Europe | | Other | | Total | |
| Club | Season | Division | Apps | Goals | Apps | Goals | Apps | Goals | Apps | Goals | Apps | Goals |
|---|---|---|---|---|---|---|---|---|---|---|---|---|
| Arsenal U21 | 2018–19 | — | | | — | | — | | 2 (Note: Appearances in the EFL Trophy) | 0 | 2 | 0 |
| Arsenal U21 | 2019–20 | — | | | — | | — | | 3 | 0 | 3 | 0 |
| Arsenal U21 | Total | | — | | — | | — | | 5 | 0 | 5 | 0 |
| Dinamo Zagreb II | 2019–20 | Druga HNL | 2 | 0 | — | | — | | — | | 2 | 0 |
| Dinamo Zagreb II | 2020–21 | Druga HNL | 4 | 0 | — | | — | | — | | 4 | 0 |
| Dinamo Zagreb II | 2021–22 | Druga HNL | 4 | 0 | — | | — | | — | | 4 | 0 |
| Dinamo Zagreb II | 2022–23 | Druga HNL | 0 | 0 | — | | — | | — | | 0 | 0 |
| Dinamo Zagreb II | Total | | 10 | 0 | — | | — | | — | | 10 | 0 |
| Dinamo Zagreb | 2020–21 | Prva HNL | 14 | 0 | 2 | 0 | 2 (Note: Appearances in UEFA Europa League) | 0 | — | | 18 | 0 |
| Dinamo Zagreb | 2021–22 | Prva HNL | 0 | 0 | 0 | 0 | 0 | 0 | — | | 0 | 0 |
| Dinamo Zagreb | 2022–23 | Prva HNL | 0 | 0 | 0 | 0 | 0 | 0 | — | | 0 | 0 |
| Dinamo Zagreb | Total | | 14 | 0 | 2 | 0 | 2 | 0 | — | | 18 | 0 |
| Istra 1961 (loan) | 2021–22 | Prva HNL | 1 | 0 | — | | — | | — | | 1 | 0 |
| Sligo Rovers (loan) | 2022 | League of Ireland Premier Division | 12 | 0 | 1 | 0 | 1 (Note: Appearances in UEFA Europa Conference League) | 0 | — | | 14 | 0 |
| Sligo Rovers | 2023 | League of Ireland Premier Division | 7 | 0 | — | | — | | — | | 7 | 0 |
| Career total | | | 44 | 0 | 3 | 0 | 3 | 0 | 5 | 0 | 55 | 0 |
