= Erhun Obanor =

Nigerian footballer (born 1995)

Personal information
- Date of birth: 5 September 1995 (age 31)
- Place of birth: Benin City, Nigeria
- Height: 1.92 m (6 ft 4 in)
- Position: Defender

Youth career
- –2012: BJ Foundation Academy

Senior career*
| Years | Team | Apps | (Gls) |
| 2012–2016 | BJ Foundation Academy | | |
| 2012–2013 | → COD United (loan) | | |
| 2013–2015 | → Bendel Insurance (loan) | | |
| 2014–2015 | → Abia Warriors (loan) | | |
| 2016 | → MFM (loan) | | |
| 2016–2018 | Greuther Fürth | 0 | (0) |
| 2018–2019 | Rudeš | 23 | (0) |
| 2019–2020 | Kukësi | 26 | (0) |
| 2020–2021 | Laçi | 27 | (0) |
| 2021–2022 | Istra | 1 | (0) |
| 2022 | → PAEEK (loan) | 9 | (0) |
| 2022–2023 | Proodeftiki | 9 | (0) |
| 2023 | Tirana | 0 | (0) |
| 2023–2024 | Al-Ain | 31 | (0) |
| 2024–2025 | Al-Zulfi | 30 | (1) |

International career
| 2014- | Nigeria U23 | 11 | (0) |
| 2014 | Nigeria | 2 | (0) |
- * Club domestic league appearances and goals as of 16 June 2025

Erhun Obanor (born 5 September 1995) is a Nigerian professional footballer who plays as a defender.

== Club career ==
A native of Benin City, Obanor is a product of the BJ Foundation Academy. He was loaned out at the start of the 2012-2013 season to the second-tier side COD United F.C. Mid-2013, he was loaned on to top-tier side Bendel Insurance., playing a season there before being sub-loaned to Abia Warriors F.C. until November 2015. In January 2016, Obanor signed a 3.5-year long contract with the Tunisian greats Club Africain, but had to cancel it and return to Nigeria because of dubious transfer fee reasons. In April 2016, he was loaned on by BJ Academy to MFM F.C.

Obanor moved abroad, however, already in July 2017, signing for SpVgg Greuther Fürth in Germany, joining the team in September of the same year, following the 2016 Summer Olympics. However, he didn't break into the team, and found himself unable to get any playing time, his nationality preventing him from playing for the reserves. His contract was finally rescinded in the summer of 2018, and he moved to NK Rudeš in Croatia.

After two years playing in Albania for Kukësi and KF Laçi, Obanor returned to Croatia to sign for Istra in June 2021.

Having only accumulated a single league appearance for the Croatian side in 2021, Obanor was sent in January 2022 on loan to the Cypriot First Division side PAEEK until the end of the season.

On 1 August 2023, Obanor joined Saudi Arabian club Al-Ain. On 30 July 2024, Obanor joined Al-Zulfi.

== International career ==
Obanor was a member of the Nigeria national football team. He was selected by Nigeria for their 35-man provisional squad for the 2016 Summer Olympics.
