= Gonzalo Gamarra =

Argentine footballer (born 1999)

Personal information
- Full name: Gonzalo Julián Gamarra Leyton
- Date of birth: 2 July 1999 (age 27)
- Place of birth: Quitilipi, Argentina
- Height: 1.82 m (6 ft 0 in)
- Position: Left-back

Team information
- Current team: Floriana
- Number: 25

Youth career
- Juventud Cooperativista
- 2010–2011: River Plate
- 2012–2017: Boca Juniors

Senior career*
Years	Team	Apps	(Gls)
2017–2018	Senglea Athletic	16	(0)
2018	Gavorrano	0	(0)
2019	Senglea Athletic	10	(0)
2019–2021	Chiasso	33	(0)
2021–2022	Slaven Belupo	11	(0)
2021–2022	→ Inter Zaprešić (loan)	20	(0)
2023	Güemes	24	(0)
2024	Brown de Adrogué	22	(1)
2025–	Floriana	34	(1)
- * Club domestic league appearances and goals as of 7 May 2026

Gonzalo Julián Gamarra Leyton (born 2 July 1999) is an Argentine professional footballer who plays as a left-back for Maltese Premier League club Floriana.

== Career ==
Gamarra played at youth level for Juventud Cooperativista, River Plate and Boca Juniors. He began his senior career with Maltese Premier League outfit Senglea Athletic in 2017. He made his debut on 23 September versus Tarxien Rainbows. A first sending off occurred on 4 March 2018 against Ħamrun Spartans, amid sixteen 2017–18 games. Gamarra left in mid-2018 for Italian Serie D team Gavorrano, though he'd rejoin Senglea in January 2019 after not playing for Gavorrano. After ten games for Senglea, Gamarra headed to Switzerland to sign for Challenge League club Chiasso. He was sent off in both his second and last appearance.

On 29 January 2021, having terminated his Chiasso contract two days prior, Gamarra signed with Croatian First League side Slaven Belupo. He debuted on 8 February by starting a home loss to Gorica, though would be substituted off for Frano Mlinar with twenty-eight minutes remaining.

== Career statistics ==
As of 23 February 2021.

Appearances and goals by club, season and competition
Club	Season	League			Cup		League Cup		Continental		Other		Total	
Club	Season	Division	Apps	Goals	Apps	Goals	Apps	Goals	Apps	Goals	Apps	Goals	Apps	Goals
Senglea Athletic	2017–18	Premier League	16	0	0	0	—		—		0	0	16	0
Gavorrano	2018–19	Serie D	0	0	0	0	0	0	—		0	0	0	0
Senglea Athletic	2018–19	Premier League	10	0	0	0	—		—		0	0	10	0
Chiasso	2019–20	Challenge League	32	0	0	0	—		—		0	0	32	0
Chiasso	2020–21	Challenge League	1	0	1	0	—		—		0	0	2	0
Chiasso	Total		33	0	1	0	—		—		0	0	34	0
Slaven Belupo	2020–21	First League	2	0	0	0	—		—		0	0	2	0
Career total			61	0	1	0	0	0	—		0	0	62	0
