= Nutrition and Health =

- Discipline: Nutrition
- Language: English
- Edited by: Michael Crawford

Publication details
- History: 1982-present
- Publisher: SAGE Publications
- Frequency: Quarterly

Standard abbreviations
- ISO 4: Nutr. Health

Indexing
- ISSN: 0260-1060
- OCLC no.: 8790842

Links
- Journal homepage; Online access; Online archive

Nutrition and Health is a quarterly peer-reviewed medical journal that covers the field of nutrition. The editor-in-chief is Michael Crawford (Imperial College London). It was established in 1982 and is currently published by SAGE Publications.

== Abstracting and indexing ==
Nutrition and Health is abstracted and indexed in:

- Agroforestry Abstracts
- ArticleFirst
- Biological Abstracts
- Food Science and Technology Abstracts
- Physical Education Index
