= Marin Laušić =

Croatian footballer (born 2001)

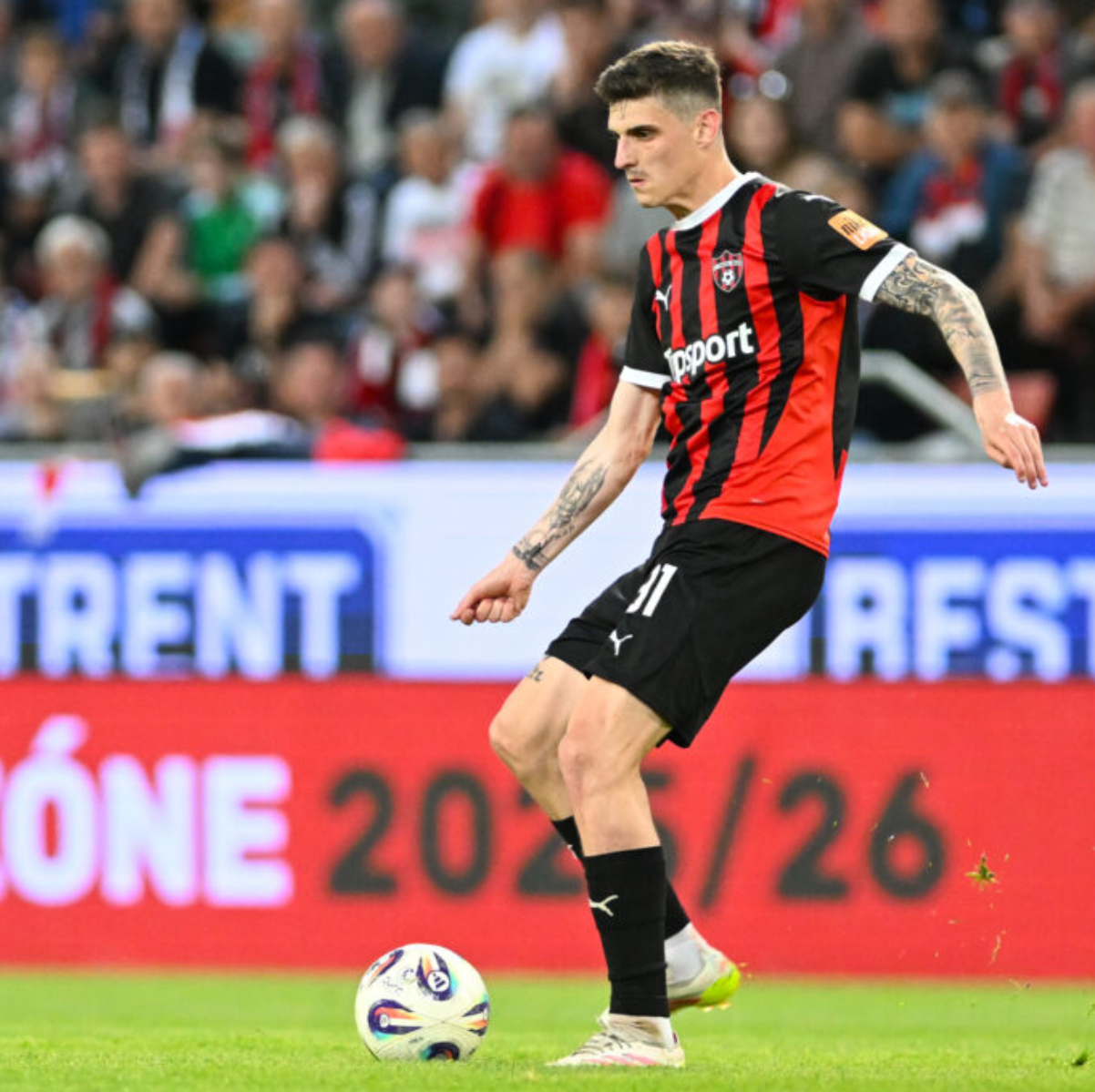
- Laušić in action for Spartak Trnava in 2026

Personal information
- Date of birth: 26 June 2001 (age 25)
- Place of birth: Split, Croatia
- Height: 1.87 m (6 ft 2 in)
- Position: Midfielder

Team information
- Current team: Spartak Trnava
- Number: 91

Youth career
- –2014: NK Adriatic
- 2014–2017: Hajduk Split
- 2017–2019: Solin
- 2019–2020: Slaven Belupo

Senior career*
Years	Team	Apps	(Gls)
2020–2022	Slaven Belupo	23	(2)
2020–2021	→ Solin (loan)	28	(3)
2022–2024	Maribor	36	(3)
2024–2025	Liepāja	44	(4)
2026–	Spartak Trnava	26	(1)

International career
2021	Croatia U21	1	(0)
2022	Croatia U20	3	(0)
- * Club domestic league appearances and goals as of 21 November 2026

Marin Laušić (born 26 June 2001) is a Croatian footballer who plays for Slovak First League club Spartak Trnava as a midfielder.

Laušić grew up playing football in his hometown club of Hajduk Split. As a youth player, he played for NK Solin and later Slaven Belupo. He also played at the men's level in both of these clubs. He later transferred to Slovenian NK Maribor, where he would make his European debut and play in the final of the 2023 Slovenian Cup. In July 2024 he joined FK Liepaja. He played regularly for the club, playing 44 league games in a year and a half, where he would be able to score four goals and assist eight. In 2026 he joined FC Spartak Trnava.

He is also a former Croatian youth represent, playing for the U20 and U21 sides.

== Club career ==
=== Early career ===
Laušić spent four years in the Hajduk Split youth academy. From there he went to NK Solin, and would later get his first professional contract at Croatian First League club Slaven Belupo. Laušić made 26 appearances for altogether for Slaven Belupo in the league and Cup, scoring twice providing two assists. He made his debut in the first round of the 2021/22 season in a 2–0 victory against Dinamo Zagreb. He scored and assisted a goal in a 3–2 win against Hajduk Split, and would receive his first call up to the U21 team after his performance.

=== NK Maribor ===
On 2 August 2022, Laušić joined Slovenian club NK Maribor, signing a three year contract. Two days later, he made his debut for the club, coming on as a substitute for Andraž Žinič in a 2–0 loss against HJK Helsinki in the third round of the Europa League. Ten days later, he also made his league debut, this time coming on for Žan Vipotnik in a 3–2 away defeat against Domžale. On 6 December 2022, Laušić scored his first goal for the club, in a 7–0 league win against Radomlje. He started in the 2022–23 Slovenian Cup final against NK Olimpija Ljubljana, where Maribor would lose 2–1 after Timi Max Elšnik would score the winning penalty for Olimpija in the 120+10th minute of extra time. Laušić played 36 league games for Maribor, scoring three goals. He fell out of favor after the arrival of coach Ante Šimundža, and in his final season he only made 13 appearances in the First League.

=== FK Liepāja ===
In 2024, Laušić joined Latvian club FK Liepāja. In his last season with the club, he was one of the most important players. He would make 30 appearances, scoring 3 times and assisting 5 goals. He played a significant role with the club, helping them finish 3rd in the Latvian First League and securing Conference League matches. Laušić would be released by the club after no being able to agree on an extension.

=== Spartak Trnava ===
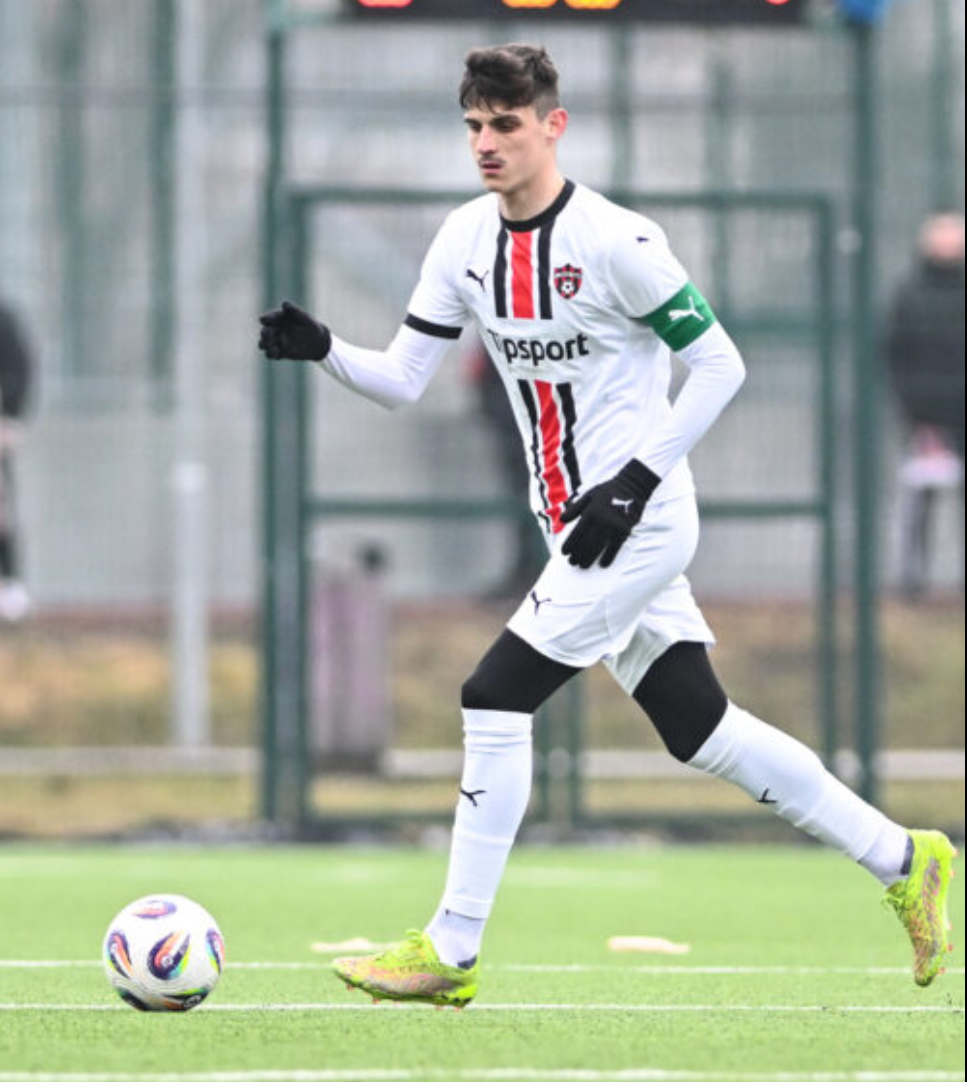
Laušić playing in a friendly against MFK Zvolen.

On 24 January 2026, it was announced that Laušić would be the first winter signing of Slovak club Spartak Trnava, signing a two-and-a-half-year contract. He debuted for the club in a 1–1 draw against rivals Slovan Bratislava in the Slovak Cup round of 16, where he helped Spartak advance after winning 5–4 on penalties. He made his first goal contribution on 7 March 2026, assisting a goal to Luka Khorkheli in a 1–0 away win against MŠK Žilina.

== International career ==
On 1 November 2021, Laušić was called-up to the Croatia national under-21 football team for the first time ahead of matches against Estonia and Austria. He debuted ten days later on 11 November, coming on as a substitute for Stipe Biuk in a 2–0 home match win against Estonia.
