= Ivan Čović =

Croatian footballer

Personal information
- Date of birth: 17 September 1990 (age 36)
- Place of birth: Zagreb, Croatia
- Height: 1.94 m (6 ft 4 1/2 in)
- Position: Goalkeeper

Team information
- Current team: Slaven Belupo
- Number: 32

Youth career
- 1998–2007: Inter Zaprešić
- 2007–2008: Dinamo Zagreb
- 2008–2009: Inter Zaprešić

Senior career*
Years	Team	Apps	(Gls)
2009–2010	Inter Zaprešić	31	(0)
2010–2014	Hrvatski Dragovoljac	101	(0)
2014–2017	Inter Zaprešić	67	(0)
2017–2018	Apollon Smyrnis	22	(0)
2018–2019	Sepsi OSK	0	(0)
2019–2020	Gorica	0	(0)
2020–	Slaven Belupo	55	(0)
- * Club domestic league appearances and goals as of 15 June 2026

Ivan Čović (born 17 September 1990) is a Croatian footballer who plays as a goalkeeper for Slaven Belupo.

== Club career ==
=== Inter Zaprešić ===
On July 1, 2009, Čović signed his first professional contract with Inter Zaprešić.

=== NK Hrvatski Dragovoljac ===
On July 2, 2010, Čović signed for NK Hrvatski Dragovoljac as a free agent. He played for the team from 2010 to 2014 having 101 apps.

=== Return to Inter Zaprešić ===
On September 1, 2014, Čović returned to his former club NK Inter Zaprešić for an undisclosed fee.

=== Apollon Smyrnis ===
In June 2017, Čović switched clubs and countries and signed for Apollon Smyrnis.

=== Sepsi OSK Sfântu Gheorghe and HNK Gorica ===
Čović joined Sepsi OSK on 28 June 2018. He played there until 13 February 2019, where he joined HNK Gorica.
