= Miroslav Iličić =

Croatian footballer

Personal information
- Date of birth: 17 April 1998 (age 28)
- Place of birth: Rijeka, Croatia
- Height: 1.85 m (6 ft 1 in)
- Position: Forward

Team information
- Current team: Orijent
- Number: 9

Youth career
- –2010: Grobničan
- 2010–2017: Rijeka

Senior career*
Years	Team	Apps	(Gls)
2015–2016	Rijeka II	20	(1)
2017–2020	Orijent	72	(33)
2020–2021	Slaven Belupo	19	(2)
2021–2022	Istra 1961	11	(0)
2022	Celje	3	(0)
2022–2023	Gorica	19	(2)
2023–2024	Botoșani	14	(1)
2024	Podbeskidzie	10	(2)
2024–2025	Široki Brijeg	22	(3)
2025	Foggia	10	(1)
2026–	Orijent	16	(7)
- * Club domestic league appearances and goals as of 17 June 2026

Miroslav Iličić (born 17 April 1998) is a Croatian professional footballer who plays as a forward for Orijent.
