= Antonio Perera =

Spanish footballer

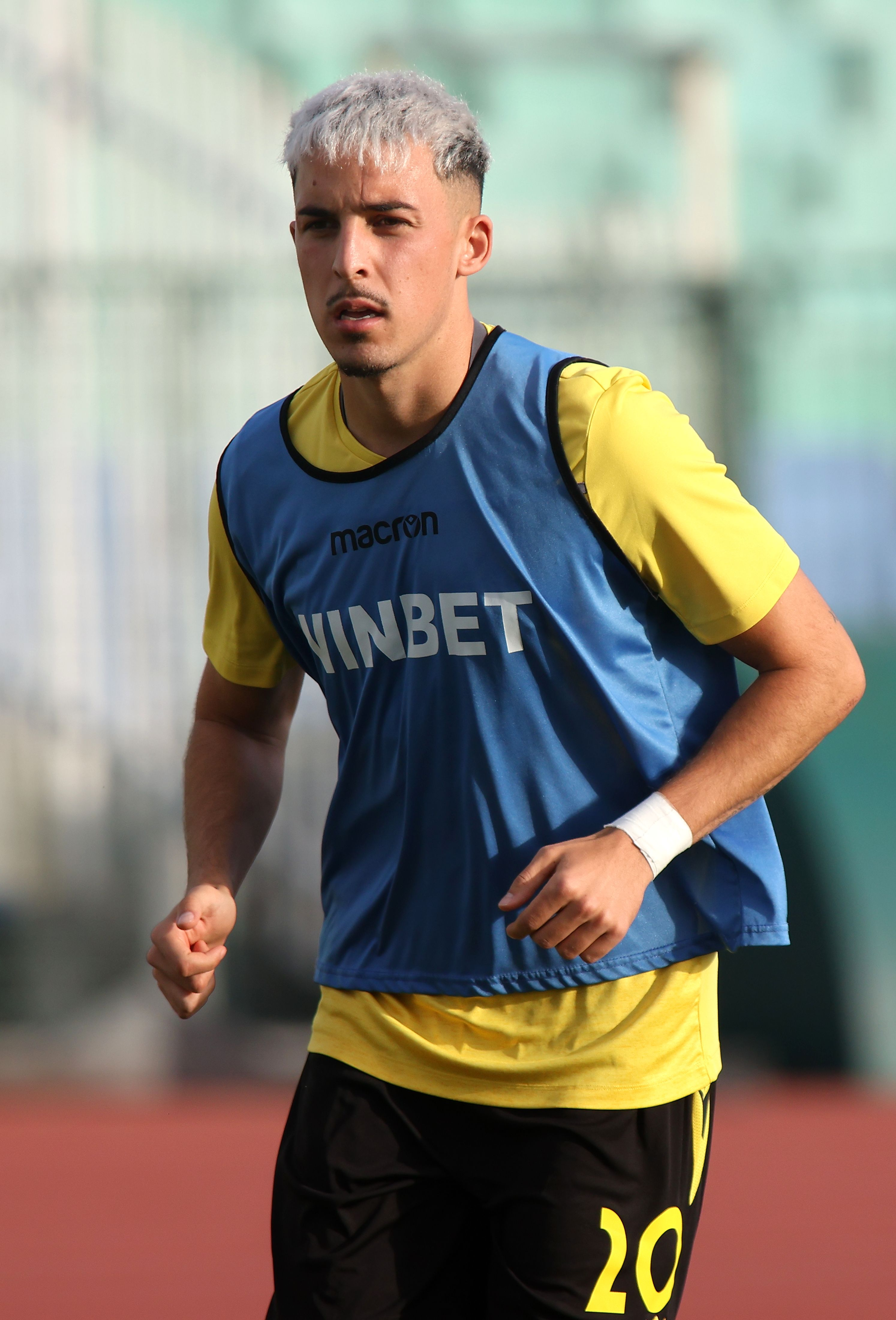
- Perera for Botev Plovdiv in the 2022–23 season

Personal information
- Full name: Antonio Perera Calderón
- Date of birth: 8 June 1997 (age 29)
- Place of birth: Novelda del Guadiana, Spain
- Height: 1.86 m (6 ft 1 in)
- Position: Central midfielder

Team information
- Current team: Lugo
- Number: 12

Youth career
- Gévora
- Flecha Negra
- Diocesano

Senior career*
Years	Team	Apps	(Gls)
2016–2017	Extremadura B	23	(3)
2017	Extremadura	6	(1)
2017–2020	Alavés B	83	(4)
2020–2022	Alavés	0	(0)
2020–2022	→ Istra 1961 (loan)	44	(0)
2022–2025	Botev Plovdiv	47	(2)
2026–	Lugo	11	(0)
- * Club domestic league appearances and goals as of 9 June 2026

Antonio Perera Calderón (born 8 June 1997) is a Spanish professional footballer who plays as a central midfielder for Primera Federación club Lugo.

== Career ==
Perera was born in Novelda del Guadiana, Badajoz, Extremadura, and represented CD Gévora, CP Flecha Negra and CD Diocesano as a youth. In 2016, after finishing his formation, he moved to Extremadura UD; initially assigned to the reserves in Tercera División, he also featured for the first team in Segunda División B during the campaign.

In November 2017, Perera signed a three-year contract with Deportivo Alavés, being assigned to the B-side also in the fourth division. He was a regular starter for the B's during the following years, helping in their promotion to the third level in 2019.

On 19 August 2020, Perera signed a new four-year contract with the Babazorros, being immediately loaned to Croatian First Football League side NK Istra 1961 for one year. He made his professional debut on 8 November, coming on as a late substitute for Slavko Blagojević in 5–0 away loss against GNK Dinamo Zagreb.

On 5 August 2022, Perera was transferred to Bulgarian First League club PFC Botev Plovdiv.

On 20 January 2026, Perera signed with Lugo in the Spanish third tier.

== Honours ==
Botev Plovdiv

- Bulgarian Cup: 2023–24
