= Frano Mlinar =

Croatian footballer

Personal information
- Date of birth: 30 March 1992 (age 34)
- Place of birth: Zagreb, Croatia
- Height: 1.84 m (6 ft 0 in)
- Position: Midfielder

Team information
- Current team: Maksimir

Youth career
- 1999–2010: Dinamo Zagreb

Senior career*
Years	Team	Apps	(Gls)
2010–2011	Dinamo Zagreb	1	(0)
2010–2012	Lokomotiva	27	(0)
2012–2013	Inter Zaprešić	41	(2)
2013–2016	Udinese	0	(0)
2014–2015	→ Aarau (loan)	14	(0)
2015–2016	→ Inter Zaprešić (loan)	29	(0)
2016–2017	Wil	20	(0)
2017–2018	Mezőkövesd	21	(1)
2018–2019	Lokomotiva	12	(0)
2019–2020	Inter Zaprešić	30	(1)
2020–2021	Slaven Belupo	25	(0)
2021–2024	Istra 1961	84	(4)
2024–2025	Zrinjski Mostar	6	(0)
2025	Mura	11	(0)
2025–2026	Jarun Zagreb	16	(0)
2026–	Maksimir	0	(0)

International career
2007	Croatia U15	5	(0)
2008	Croatia U16	5	(1)
2008–2009	Croatia U17	10	(1)
2009–2010	Croatia U18	9	(2)
2010–2011	Croatia U19	13	(1)
2011–2013	Croatia U20	9	(0)
2013–2014	Croatia U21	2	(0)
- * Club domestic league appearances and goals as of 3 March 2026

Frano Mlinar (born 30 March 1992) is a Croatian professional football who plays as a midfielder for Maksimir.

== Club career ==
A product of Dinamo Zagreb Academy, Mlinar was promoted to the club's first team squad in January 2010, and had his professional league debut in the second part of the 2009–10 season. However, he made only one appearance for the club before the end of season and was subsequently loaned to NK Lokomotiva, Dinamo's farm team, in June 2010, staying there for a year and a half before cancelling his contract with Dinamo and moving to NK Inter Zaprešić.

On 1 July 2013, Mlinar joined Italian club Udinese Calcio for €1 million and he was given shirt number 14.

On 8 June 2021, Mlinar signed with Istra.

== International career ==
Internationally, Mlinar represented Croatia at all youth levels up until the Croatia under-21 team.
