= 2018–19 NK Istra 1961 season =

NK Istra 1961
2018–19 season
- Owner: Baskonia - Alavés Group
- Manager: Darko Raić-Sudar (until 10 July 2018); Manolo Márquez (10 July 2018 - 18 September 2018); Curro Torres (20 September 2018 - 27 October 2018); Krunoslav Rendulić (28 October 2018 - 4 March 2019); Igor Cvitanović (since 4 March 2019)
- Stadium: Stadion Aldo Drosina
- Prva HNL: 9th (play-off winners)
- Croatian Cup: Second round
- Top goalscorer: League: Ramón Miérez (9); All: Ramón Miérez (10)
- Highest home attendance: 3,470 v Hajduk Split (23 September 2018)
- Lowest home attendance: 392 v Rudeš (24 May 2019)
- Average home league attendance: 1,348
Home colours	Away colours

The 2018–19 NK Istra 1961 season was the club's 58th season in existence and the 10th consecutive season in the top flight of Croatian football. Additionally, it was the first season under ownership of Spanish Baskonia - Alavés Group.

== First-team squad ==
As of 3 June 2019

Note: Flags indicate national team as defined under FIFA eligibility rules; some limited exceptions apply. Players may hold more than one non-FIFA nationality.

No.	Pos.	Nation	Player
1	GK	ESP	Ioritz Landeta
2	DF	BRA	Maicon da Silva
3	DF	CRO	Petar Rubić
4	DF	ESP	Julio Rodríguez
5	DF	CRO	Tomislav Čuljak
6	DF	CRO	Petar Bosančić
7	MF	ESP	Dani Iglesias (on loan from Deportivo Alavés)
8	MF	ESP	Einar Galilea (on loan from Deportivo Alavés)
9	MF	ESP	Adrián Fuentes (on loan from Deportivo Alavés)
10	FW	LTU	Karolis Laukžemis
11	MF	CMR	Dani Ndi
12	GK	CRO	Josip Čondrić
13	FW	ARG	Ramón Miérez (on loan from Tigre)
15	DF	CRO	Martin Franić
16	DF	MKD	Agron Rufati

No.	Pos.	Nation	Player
17	MF	SEN	Arona Sané
18	FW	CRO	Robert Perić-Komšić
20	MF	CRO	Antonio Ivančić
21	GK	CRO	Lovro Majkić
22	DF	CRO	Marin Grujević (captain)
23	MF	MNE	Stefan Lončar (on loan from Deportivo Alavés)
24	DF	AUT	Markus Pavić
25	DF	GUF	Kévin Rimane (on loan from Paris Saint-Germain)
26	MF	GHA	Obeng Regan
28	MF	VEN	Octavio Páez
29	MF	KOS	Enbija Shehu
30	MF	CRO	Hisa Ramadani
31	MF	CRO	Toni Burić
32	MF	ESP	Madger Gomes
34	FW	BRA	Bruno Sávio (on loan from Louletano)

== Transfers ==
=== In ===
Pos	Player	Transferred from	Fee	Date	Source
DF	(Croatia) Marin Grujević	(Croatia) Rudeš	Free	12 July 2018	
DF	(Spain) Julio Rodríguez	(Spain) Recreativo	Free	12 July 2018	
DF	(France) Nicolas Senzemba	(France) Sochaux	Loan	12 July 2018	
MF	(France) Michel Espinosa	(France) Laval	Free	12 July 2018	
MF	(Senegal) Arona Sané	(Spain) Atlético Madrid	Free	12 July 2018	
MF	(Spain) Adrián Fuentes	(Spain) Deportivo Alavés B	Loan	12 July 2018	
GK	(Spain) Ioritz Landeta	(Spain) Deportivo Alavés B	Free	21 July 2018	
DF	(Croatia) Petar Rubić	(Croatia) Cibalia	Free	21 July 2018	
MF	(Ghana) Obeng Regan	(Serbia) Čukarički	Free	21 July 2018	
DF	(Croatia) Petar Bosančić	(Croatia) Hajduk Split	Free	25 July 2018	
MF	(Croatia) Antonio Ivančić	(Croatia) Rudeš	Free	25 July 2018	
FW	(Croatia) Vice Miljanić	(Croatia) Rudeš	Free	25 July 2018	
MF	(Spain) Dani Iglesias	(Spain) Deportivo Alavés B	Loan	26 July 2018	
FW	(Albania) Eraldo Çinari	(Spain) Deportivo Alavés B	Loan	26 July 2018	
FW	(Argentina) Luis Vila	(Argentina) Olimpo	Free	26 July 2018	
GK	(Croatia) Josip Čondrić	(Croatia) Rudeš	Free	27 July 2018	
DF	(Argentina) Tomás Oneto	(Argentina) Talleres	Loan	27 July 2018	
MF	(Spain) Arturo Segado	(Spain) Deportivo Alavés	Loan	27 July 2018	
FW	(Lithuania) Karolis Laukžemis	(Lithuania) Sūduva	Free	28 July 2018	
GK	(Croatia) Lovro Majkić	(Croatia) Rijeka U19	Free	30 July 2018	
DF	(Croatia) Martin Franić	(Croatia) Rudeš	Free	1 August 2018	
DF	(North Macedonia) Agron Rufati	(Croatia) Lokomotiva	Free	1 August 2018	
MF	(Argentina) Agustín Cardozo	(Argentina) Tigre	Loan	1 August 2018	
FW	(Argentina) Ramón Miérez	(Argentina) Tigre	Loan (fee: €250,000 )	1 August 2018	
FW	(Mali) Moha Traoré	(Spain) Cádiz	Free	7 August 2018	
FW	(Croatia) Robert Perić-Komšić	(Spain) Deportivo Alavés B	Free	24 August 2018	
MF	(Spain) Francisco Tena	No team	Free	31 August 2018	
MF	(South Korea) Kim Young-gyu	(Spain) Mérida	Free	31 August 2018	
MF	(Panama) José Luis Rodríguez	(Belgium) Gent II	Free	31 August 2018	
MF	(Ecuador) Jonathan Caicedo	(Ecuador) 9 de Octubre	Free	23 October 2018	
MF	(Cameroon) Dani Ndi	No team	Free	4 January 2019	
DF	(Austria) Markus Pavić	(France) Sochaux	Free	14 January 2019	
MF	(Spain) Einar Galilea	(Spain) Deportivo Alavés	Loan	14 January 2019	
MF	(Montenegro) Stefan Lončar	(Spain) Deportivo Alavés	Loan	18 January 2019	
MF	(Spain) Madger Gomes	(France) Sochaux	Free	24 January 2019	
FW	(Brazil) Bruno Sávio	(Portugal) Louletano	Loan	30 January 2019	
MF	(Democratic Republic of the Congo) Jordan Nkololo	No team	Free	4 February 2019	
DF	(Brazil) Maicon da Silva	(Italy) Livorno	Free	5 February 2019	
DF	(French Guiana) Kévin Rimane	(France) Paris Saint-Germain	Loan	8 February 2019	

Source: Glasilo Hrvatskog nogometnog saveza

=== Out ===
Pos	Player	Transferred to	Fee	Date	Source
MF	(Croatia) Dino Halilović	(Croatia) Lokomotiva	Free	20 June 2018	
DF	(Croatia) Antonio Pavić	(Bosnia and Herzegovina) Željezničar Sarajevo	Free	26 June 2018	
GK	(Croatia) Marijan Ćorić	No team	Free	1 July 2018	
GK	(Croatia) Vanja Iveša	No team	Free	1 July 2018	
DF	(Croatia) Ivan Zgrablić	(Romania) Voluntari	Free	1 July 2018	
FW	(Croatia) Andrej Kerić	(Maldives) United Victory	Free	1 July 2018	
MF	(Croatia) Josip Krznarić	(Austria) Lafnitz	Free	10 August 2018	
MF	(Croatia) Andrea Ottochian	(Croatia) Vinogradar	Free	17 August 2018	
FW	(Croatia) Nikola Prelčec	(Croatia) Dugopolje	Free	17 August 2018	
FW	(Canada) Colin Jacques	No team	Free	27 August 2018	
MF	(Bosnia and Herzegovina) Dejan Maksimović	(Serbia) Zemun	Free	30 August 2018	
FW	(Albania) Eraldo Çinari	(Spain) Deportivo Alavés	Recalled from loan	30 August 2018	
DF	(France) Nicolas Senzemba	(France) Sochaux	Recalled from loan	31 August 2018	
MF	(Croatia) Goran Roce	No team	Retired	8 November 2018	
MF	(Spain) Francisco Tena	No team	Free	17 December 2018	
FW	(Argentina) Luis Vila	No team	Free	17 December 2018	
MF	(Spain) Arturo Segado	(Spain) Deportivo Alavés	Recalled from loan	8 January 2019	
DF	(Argentina) Tomás Oneto	(Argentina) Talleres	Recalled from loan	18 January 2019	
MF	(South Korea) Kim Young-gyu	(Spain) El Ejido	Loan	24 January 2019	
FW	(Mali) Moha Traoré	(Spain) Melilla	Loan	24 January 2019	
MF	(Panama) José Luis Rodríguez	(Spain) Deportivo Alavés B	Loan	31 January 2019	
MF	(Argentina) Agustín Cardozo	(Argentina) Tigre	Recalled from loan	1 February 2019	
FW	(Croatia) Vice Miljanić	(Slovenia) Brda	Loan	15 February 2019	
MF	(Democratic Republic of the Congo) Jordan Nkololo	No team	Free	16 April 2019	
MF	(France) Michel Espinosa	No team	Free	29 April 2019	
MF	(Ecuador) Jonathan Caicedo	No team	Free	1 May 2019	

Source: Glasilo Hrvatskog nogometnog saveza

Total spending: ▼€250,000

Total income: ▲€0

Total expenditure: ▼€250,000

== Competitions ==
=== Overview ===
Competition	First match	Last match	Starting round	Final position	Record							
Competition	First match	Last match	Starting round	Final position	Pld	W	D	L	GF	GA	GD	Win %
HT Prva liga	29 July 2018	24 May 2019	Matchday 1	9th	36	6	7	23	31	73	−42	16.67
Relegation play-offs	31 May 2019	3 June 2019	First leg	Winners	2	1	1	0	3	1	+2	50.00
Croatian Cup	26 September 2018	30 October 2018	First round	Second round	2	1	0	1	5	4	+1	50.00
Total					40	8	8	24	39	78	−39	20.00

Last updated: 9 April 2021
Source: Soccerway

=== HT Prva liga ===
==== League table ====
Pos	Team	Pld	W	D	L	GF	GA	GD	Pts	Qualification or relegation
6	Lokomotiva	36	13	10	13	51	43	+8	49	
7	Slaven Belupo	36	7	16	13	41	53	−12	37	
8	Inter Zaprešić	36	9	4	23	40	84	−44	31	
9	Istra 1961 (O)	36	6	7	23	31	73	−42	25	Qualification for the Relegation play-offs
10	Rudeš (R)	36	3	5	28	26	80	−54	14	Relegation to Croatian Second Football League

Source: PrvaHNL.hr
Rules for classification: 1) Points; 2) Head-to-head points; 3) Head-to-head goal difference; 4) Head-to-head goals scored (at home if two teams tied); 5) Goal difference; 6) Goals scored; 7) Play-off
(Note: Criteria 2-4 and 7 is only used if deciding champion, teams to international competition or teams for relegation and in that case criteria 6 will not be used).
(O) Play-off winners; (R) Relegated

==== Results summary ====
Overall								Home						Away					
Pld	W	D	L	GF	GA	GD	Pts	W	D	L	GF	GA	GD	W	D	L	GF	GA	GD
36	6	7	23	31	73	−42	25	3	4	11	12	36	−24	3	3	12	19	37	−18

Last updated: 9 April 2021.
Source: Competitive matches

==== Results by round ====
Round	1	2	3	4	5	6	7	8	9	10	11	12	13	14	15	16	17	18	19	20	21	22	23	24	25	26	27	28	29	30	31	32	33	34	35	36
Ground	H	A	A	H	A	H	A	H	A	A	H	H	A	H	A	H	A	H	H	A	A	H	A	H	A	H	A	A	H	H	A	H	A	H	A	H
Result	D	L	L	L	D	L	W	L	W	L	L	D	L	L	W	L	L	W	D	L	L	D	L	L	L	L	L	D	L	W	D	L	L	L	L	W
Position	6	9	10	10	9	9	9	9	8	9	9	9	9	9	9	9	9	9	9	9	9	9	9	9	9	9	9	9	9	9	9	9	9	9	9	9

Updated to match(es) played on 24 May 2019. Source: Prva HNL
A = Away; H = Home; W = Win; D = Draw; L = Loss

==== Matches ====
29 July 2018 1	Istra 1961	1–1	Slaven Belupo	Pula
18:30 CEST (UTC+02:00)	Espinosa (yellow card) 31'; Rubić 74'; Segado (yellow card) 90'	Report	Šarlija (yellow card) 25'; Bongongui 52'; Aparicio (yellow card) 63'; Međimorec (yellow card) 71'	Stadium: Stadion Aldo Drosina; Attendance: 2,002; Referee: Mario Zebec

3 August 2018 2	Dinamo Zagreb	3–0	Istra 1961	Zagreb
21:00 CEST (UTC+02:00)	Gavranović 12' 47'; Leovac 45+1'; Šunjić (yellow card) 57'	Report	J. Rodríguez (yellow card) 38'; Grujević (yellow card) 42'	Stadium: Stadion Maksimir; Attendance: 2,710; Referee: Goran Gabrilo

12 August 2018 3	Osijek	3–0	Istra 1961	Osijek
18:30 CEST (UTC+02:00)	Škorić (yellow card) 21'; Henty 49'; Hajradinović 73' (pen.); Lončar 80'; Grgić (yellow card) 68'	Report	Espinosa (yellow card) 61'; Traoré (yellow card) 67'	Stadium: Gradski Vrt Stadium; Attendance: 2,359; Referee: Ivan Vučković

18 August 2018 4	Istra 1961	1–2	Lokomotiva	Pula
21:00 CEST (UTC+02:00)	Oneto (yellow card) 60'; Traoré (yellow card) 65'; Ivančić 73'	Report	Krstanović 29'; Jakić (yellow card) 49'; Radonjić (yellow card) 77'; Kastrati 80'	Stadium: Stadion Aldo Drosina; Attendance: 1,100; Referee: Duje Strukan

26 August 2018 5	Rijeka	3–3	Istra 1961	Rijeka
21:00 CEST (UTC+02:00)	Héber 4' 30' 79'; Čolak (yellow card) 43'	Report	Miérez 3' 17' (yellow card) 88'; Rubić (yellow card) 41'; Landeta (yellow card) 45+1'; Grujević (yellow card) 46'; Cardozo (yellow card) 59'; J. Rodríguez (yellow card) 72'; Regan 81'	Stadium: Stadion Rujevica; Attendance: 4,517; Referee: Marko Matoc

2 September 2018 6	Istra 1961	0–2	Gorica	Pula
18:30 CEST (UTC+02:00)	Rubić (yellow card) 12'	Report	Suk 74'; Zwoliński 78'; Marina (yellow card) 84'	Stadium: Stadion Aldo Drosina; Attendance: 1,351; Referee: Goran Gabrilo

14 September 2018 7	Inter Zaprešić	1–2	Istra 1961	Zaprešić
18:00 CEST (UTC+02:00)	Muhar (yellow card) 34'; Andrić (yellow card) 69' (goal) 79' (pen.); Prenga (yellow card) 74'; Rak (yellow card) 90+3'	Report	Miérez 20' 87'; Oneto (yellow card) 38'; Segado (yellow card) 45'; Rufati (yellow card) 52'; Bosančić (yellow card) 57'; Sané (yellow card) 80'; Cardozo (yellow card) 83'	Stadium: Stadion ŠRC Zaprešić; Attendance: 472; Referee: Goran Gabrilo

23 September 2018 8	Istra 1961	2–4	Hajduk Split	Pula
19:00 CEST (UTC+02:00)	J. L. Rodríguez 40'; Miérez 52' (yellow card) 87'; Oneto (yellow card) 70'; Grujević (red card) 90+2'	Report	Gyurcsó 21' 25'; Ivanovski 36' 65'; Filip (yellow card) 49'	Stadium: Stadion Aldo Drosina; Attendance: 3,470; Referee: Igor Pajač

1 October 2018 9	Rudeš	0–3	Istra 1961	Zagreb
18:00 CEST (UTC+02:00)	João Erick (yellow card) 33'; Obanor (yellow card) 34' (yellow-red card) 87'; Vojković (yellow card) 64'; Kalik (yellow card) 80'	Report	Grujević 22'; Miérez 42'; Regan (yellow card) 50' (goal) 90+2'; Cardozo (yellow card) 54'	Stadium: Stadion Kranjčevićeva; Attendance: 250; Referee: Igor Križarić

6 October 2018 10	Slaven Belupo	3–1	Istra 1961	Koprivnica
19:00 CEST (UTC+02:00)	Vidović 8'; Bogojević (yellow card) 45'; Gordana (yellow card) 64'; Mendy 66'; Bačelić-Grgić 90+1'	Report	Segado (yellow card) 41'; Miérez (yellow card) 64'; Perić-Komšić 75'	Stadium: Gradski stadion Attendance: 951; Referee: Dario Bel

20 October 2018 11	Istra 1961	1–4	Dinamo Zagreb	Pula
17:30 CEST (UTC+02:00)	Fuentes 7'; Cardozo (yellow card) 20'; Traoré (yellow card) 28'; J. L. Rodríguez (yellow card) 45+1'; Regan (yellow card) 51'; Sane (yellow card) 64'	Report	Petković 8', (yellow card) 24'; Budimir (yellow card) 27', (goal) 90+3'; Šunjić (yellow card) 34'; Rrahmani (yellow card) 62'; Gavranović 65'; Ademi 66'; Stojanović (yellow card) 74'	Stadium: Stadion Aldo Drosina; Attendance: 2,200; Referee: Tihomir Pejin

27 October 2018 12	Istra 1961	1–1	Osijek	Pula
17:30 CET (UTC+01:00)	Miérez (yellow card) 41' (goal) 86'; Traoré (yellow card) 43'; Bosančić (yellow card) 58'	Report	Pušić (yellow card) 19'; Kamenar 29'; Lončar (yellow card) 52'; Janža (yellow card) 73'; Ćavar (yellow card) 82'; Pilj (yellow card) 84'	Stadium: Stadion Aldo Drosina; Attendance: 850; Referee: Marko Matoc

3 November 2018 13	Lokomotiva	1–0	Istra 1961	Zagreb
15:00 CET (UTC+01:00)	Lecjaks 45'	Report	Regan (yellow card) 43'; Miérez (yellow card) 58' (yellow-red card) 75'; Rubić (yellow card) 67'; Traoré (yellow card) 78'; Oneto (yellow card) 85'	Stadium: Stadion Kranjčevićeva; Attendance: 729; Referee: Damir Batinić

11 November 2018 14	Istra 1961	1–2	Rijeka	Pula
15:00 CET (UTC+01:00)	J. L. Rodríguez (yellow card) 61'; Cardozo (yellow card) 79'; Perić-Komšić 88'	Report	Čolak 7'; Kvržić 35'; Zuta (yellow card) 85'; Puljić (yellow card) 90+3'	Stadium: Aldo Drosina; Attendance: 1,953; Referee: Goran Gabrilo

24 November 2018 15	Gorica	0–2	Istra 1961	Velika Gorica
17:30 CET (UTC+01:00)	Maloča (yellow card) 53'	Report	J. Rodríguez 48'; Regan 90+3'	Stadium: Stadion Radnik; Attendance: 1,577; Referee: Igor Križarić

30 November 2018 16	Istra 1961	0–2	Inter Zaprešić	Pula
16:00 CET (UTC+01:00)	J. Rodríguez (yellow card) 26'; Sané (yellow card) 31'; Traoré (yellow card) 41'; Cardozo (yellow card) 41' (yellow-red card) 89'; Bosančić (yellow card) 87'	Report	Andrić 27' (pen.) 90' (pen.); Muhar (yellow card) 41'; Šimunec (yellow card) 41' (yellow-red card) 90+3'; Čeliković (yellow card) 86'	Stadium: Stadion Aldo Drosina; Attendance: 666; Referee: Fran Jović

8 December 2018 17	Hajduk Split	3–1	Istra 1961	Split
17:30 CET (UTC+01:00)	Jradi (yellow card) 61'; Juranović (yellow card) 61'; Vučur 67'; Caktaš 76' (pen.); Ivanovski 84' (yellow card) 85'	Report	Fuentes 51'; Traoré (yellow card) 61'; Rubić (yellow card) 75'	Stadium: Stadion Poljud; Attendance: 0 Referee: Dalibor Mlakar

16 December 2018 18	Istra 1961	1–0	Rudeš	Pula
17:30 CET (UTC+01:00)	Traoré (yellow card) 57'; Iglesias (yellow card) 61'; Čuljak (yellow card) 65'; Perić-Komšić 88'; Fuentes (yellow card) 90+4'	Report	Mišković (yellow card) 46'; Filipović (yellow card) 51'; Pantalon (yellow card) 62'; Kalik (yellow card) 70'; Klepač (yellow card) 70'	Stadium: Stadion Aldo Drosina; Attendance: 500; Referee: Marko Matoc

2 February 2019 19	Istra 1961	1–1	Slaven Belupo	Pula
17:30 CET (UTC+01:00)	Sané (yellow card) 54'; Ndi 64'; Iglesias (yellow card) 89'	Report	Goda (yellow card) 54'; Krstanović 73'	Stadium: Stadion Aldo Drosina; Attendance: 524; Referee: Duje Strukan

9 February 2019 20	Dinamo Zagreb	1–0	Istra 1961	Zagreb
17:30 CET (UTC+01:00)	Leovac (yellow card) 33'; Petković 86' (pen.); Majer (yellow card) 88'	Report	Sávio (yellow card) 3'; Gomes (yellow card) 64'; Perić-Komšić (yellow card) 69'; J. Rodríguez (yellow card) 75'	Stadium: Stadion Maksimir; Attendance: 2,284; Referee: Igor Pajač

17 February 2019 21	Osijek	1–0	Istra 1961	Osijek
15:00 CET (UTC+01:00)	Abazaj 68'; Lončar (yellow card) 88'	Report	Pavić (yellow card) 61'; Regan (yellow card) 64'; Lončar (yellow card) 90+1'	Stadium: Gradski Vrt Stadium; Attendance: 2,252; Referee: Ivan Vučković

24 February 2019 22	Istra 1961	0–0	Lokomotiva	Pula
15:00 CET (UTC+01:00)	Rimane (yellow card) 29'; Galilea (yellow card) 35'; Gomes (yellow card) 87'	Report	Radonjić (yellow card) 29'; Majstorović (yellow card) 54'; Đurasek (yellow card) 90+3'	Stadium: Stadion Aldo Drosina; Attendance: 816; Referee: Dario Bel

1 March 2019 23	Rijeka	2–0	Istra 1961	Rijeka
18:00 CET (UTC+01:00)	Gorgon 43'; Kvržić (yellow card) 61'; Murić 90+2'	Report	Maicon (yellow card) 30'; Pavić (yellow card) 75'; Regan (yellow card) 85'	Stadium: Stadion Rujevica; Attendance: 4,275; Referee: Duje Strukan

9 March 2019 24	Istra 1961	0–3	Gorica	Pula
17:30 CET (UTC+01:00)	Rimane (yellow card) 42'; Bosančić (yellow card) 50'; Maicon (yellow card) 83'; Galilea (yellow card) 88'	Report	Marina (yellow card) 39'; Suk 45'; Muhammed (yellow card) 56'; Ndiaye 66' 89'; Mathieu (yellow card) 90+4'	Stadium: Stadion Aldo Drosina; Attendance: 892; Referee: Mario Zebec

15 March 2019 25	Inter Zaprešić	3–1	Istra 1961	Zaprešić
18:00 CET (UTC+01:00)	Muhar (yellow card) 22'; Brezovec (yellow card) 24'; Serderov 41' 90+3'; Mamut 80'	Report	Ndi 30' (yellow card) 78' (yellow-red card) 89'; Laukžemis (yellow card) 45'; Fuentes (yellow card) 90'	Stadium: Stadion ŠRC Zaprešić; Attendance: 360; Referee: Damir Batinić

30 March 2019 26	Istra 1961	0–2	Hajduk Split	Pula
19:00 CET (UTC+01:00)	Galilea (yellow card) 14'; Sané (yellow card) 61'; Franić (red card) 89'	Report	Jairo 11'; Ismajli (yellow card) 36'; López (yellow card) 59'; Gyurcsó 90'	Stadium: Stadion Aldo Drosina; Attendance: 2,414; Referee: Ivan Vučković

4 April 2019 27	Rudeš	1–0	Istra 1961	Zagreb
18:00 CEST (UTC+02:00)	Štrkalj 36' (pen.); Rožman (yellow card) 41'; Smoljo (yellow card) 83'	Report		Stadium: Stadion Kranjčevićeva; Attendance: 134; Referee: Tihomir Pejin

8 April 2019 28	Slaven Belupo	3–3	Istra 1961	Koprivnica
18:00 CEST (UTC+02:00)	Krstanović 12' (pen.); Čanađija (yellow card) 27'; Vidović (yellow card) 27' (goal) 64'; Mateus 52' (yellow card) 77'; Šarlija (yellow card) 90+5'	Report	Laukžemis (yellow card) 11' (goal) 27'; Lončar (yellow card) 80'; Sané (yellow card) 82'; Rimane (yellow card) 85'; Fuentes 90'; Miérez 90+7' (pen.)	Stadium: Gradski stadion Attendance: 525; Referee: Ivan Bebek

13 April 2019 29	Istra 1961	0–4	Dinamo Zagreb	Pula
16:30 CEST (UTC+02:00)		Report	Ademi 20', (yellow card) 58'; Atiemwen (yellow card) 42'; Oršić 44'; Šunjić (yellow card) 45'; Théophile-Catherine (yellow card) 55'; Olmo 65' 73'; Rrahmani (yellow card) 76'	Stadium: Stadion Aldo Drosina; Attendance: 2,141; Referee: Dario Bel

19 April 2019 30	Istra 1961	1–0	Osijek	Pula
16:30 CEST (UTC+02:00)	Lončar (yellow card) 15'; Miérez (yellow card) 18' (goal) 88'; Sané (yellow card) 33'; Pavić (yellow card) 40'	Report	Pušić (yellow card) 39'	Stadium: Stadion Aldo Drosina; Attendance: 763; Referee: Duje Strukan

26 April 2019 31	Lokomotiva	1–1	Istra 1961	Zagreb
18:00 CEST (UTC+02:00)	Ivanušec 40'; Rakić (yellow card) 79'; Burić (yellow card) 81'	Report	Galilea (yellow card) 39'; Fuentes 50'; Miérez (yellow card) 60'; Iglesias (yellow card) 62'; Rufati (yellow card) 70'; J. Rodríguez (yellow card) 90+4'	Stadium: Stadion Kranjčevićeva; Attendance: 480; Referee: Mario Zebec

4 May 2019 32	Istra 1961	0–7	Rijeka	Pula
19:00 CEST (UTC+02:00)	Franić (yellow card) 90+1'	Report	Pavičić 28' 49'; Čolak 36' 62'; Acosty 67'; Puljić 69'; Smolčić (yellow card) 77'; Capan 90'	Stadium: Aldo Drosina; Attendance: 1,741; Referee: Goran Gabrilo

10 May 2019 33	Gorica	4–1	Istra 1961	Velika Gorica
16:30 CEST (UTC+02:00)	Muhammed (yellow card) 50' (goal) 83'; Ndiaye 59' (yellow card) 72'; Dvorneković 71'; Zwoliński 80'; Čabraja (yellow card) 89'	Report	Pavić (red card) 23'; Regan 31'; J. Rodríguez (yellow card) 49'; Galilea (yellow card) 50'; Miérez (yellow card) 54'; Bosančić (yellow card) 59'	Stadium: Stadion Radnik; Attendance: 954; Referee: Damir Batinić

14 May 2019 34	Istra 1961	0–1	Inter Zaprešić	Pula
16:30 CEST (UTC+02:00)	Rimane (yellow card) 10'; Rufati (yellow card) 54'; Bosančić (yellow card) 82'; Iglesias (yellow card) 90+1'	Report	Tatomirović (yellow card) 6'; Serderov 36'; Postonjski (yellow card) 43'; Šimunec (yellow card) 64'; Valentić (yellow card) 70'; Rak (yellow card) 86'; Matković (yellow card) 90+3'	Stadium: Stadion Aldo Drosina; Attendance: 488; Referee: Dalibor Mlakar

19 May 2019 35	Hajduk Split	4–1	Istra 1961	Split
16:30 CEST (UTC+02:00)	Caktaš 48'; Gyurcsó 56'; Jairo 77'; Bradarić (yellow card) 79'; Nejašmić 90+3'	Report	Ivančić 6' (yellow card) 81'; Fuentes (yellow card) 44'; Ramadani (yellow card) 53'; Galilea (yellow card) 83'; Burić (yellow card) 89'	Stadium: Stadion Poljud; Attendance: 0 Referee: Tihomir Pejin

24 May 2019 36	Istra 1961	2–0	Rudeš	Pula
18:00 CEST (UTC+02:00)	Páez (yellow card) 53'; Iglesias 63'; Rubić (yellow card) 77'; Pavić 90+2'	Report	Božić (yellow card) 9'; João Erick (yellow card) 80'; Pejović (yellow card) 85'	Stadium: Stadion Aldo Drosina; Attendance: 392; Referee: Duje Strukan

Source: Croatian Football Federation

==== Relegation play-offs ====
31 May 2019 First leg	Šibenik	1–1	Istra 1961	Šibenik
19:00 CEST (UTC+02:00)	Kukec 13'; Pandža (yellow card) 88'	Report	Fuentes 15'; Rodríguez (yellow card) 52'; Regan (yellow card) 65'	Stadium: Stadion Šubićevac; Attendance: 3,200; Referee: Ivan Bebek

3 June 2019 Second leg	Istra 1961	2–0 (3–1 agg.)	Šibenik	Pula
19:00 CEST (UTC+02:00)	Pavić (yellow card) 3'; Fuentes 21'; Galilea (yellow card) 43'; Ivančić 70'; Iglesias (yellow card) 74'; Perić-Komšić (yellow card) 90+2'	Report	Bulat (yellow card) 37'; Blaić (yellow card) 56'; Musa (yellow card) 82'	Stadium: Stadion Aldo Drosina; Attendance: 3,209; Referee: Mario Zebec
Note: Istra 1961 won on aggregate to secure a spot in the 2019–20 Croatian First Football League.

Source: Croatian Football Federation

=== Croatian Football Cup ===
26 September 2018 R1	Sloga Nova Gradiška	2–4	Istra 1961	Nova Gradiška
15:30 CEST (UTC+02:00)	Kulundžić (yellow card) 45+3' (yellow-red card) 86'; Kašljević (yellow card) 53'; Filipović (yellow card) 73' (goal) 85'; F. Bungić 82'; D. Bungić (yellow card) 85'	Report	Oneto (yellow card) 32'; Regan (yellow card) 42'; Traoré (yellow card) 45+3' (goal) 63'; Ivančić 56' 90+3'; Sané 73'	Stadium: NK Sloga; Attendance: 650; Referee: Dario Bel

30 October 2018 R2	Inter Zaprešić	2–1	Istra 1961	Zaprešić
17:00 CET (UTC+01:00)	Ajayi 38'; Andrić (yellow card) 51'; Ćulum (yellow card) 51' (goal) 53'; Prenga (yellow card) 63'	Report	Traoré (yellow card) 19'; Oneto (yellow card) 27'; Miérez 39' (yellow card) 59'; Cardozo (yellow card) 41'	Stadium: Ivan Laljak-Ivić Stadium; Attendance: 320; Referee: Fran Jović

Source: Croatian Football Federation

== Player seasonal records ==
Updated 13 April 2021

=== Goals ===
Rank	Name	League	Relegation play-offs	Cup	Total
1	(Argentina) Ramón Miérez	9	–	1	10
2	(Spain) Adrián Fuentes	4	2	–	6
3	(Croatia) Antonio Ivančić	2	1	2	5
4	(Ghana) Obeng Regan	4	–	–	4
5	(Croatia) Robert Perić-Komšić	3	–	–	3
6	(Cameroon) Dani Ndi	2	–	–	2
7	(Croatia) Marin Grujević	1	–	–	1
7	(Spain) Dani Iglesias	1	–	–	1
7	(Lithuania) Karolis Laukžemis	1	–	–	1
7	(Austria) Markus Pavić	1	–	–	1
7	(Panama) José Luis Rodríguez	1	–	–	1
7	(Spain) Julio Rodríguez	1	–	–	1
7	(Croatia) Petar Rubić	1	–	–	1
7	(Senegal) Arona Sané	–	–	1	1
7	(Mali) Moha Traoré	–	–	1	1
TOTALS		31	3	5	39

Source: Competitive matches

=== Clean sheets ===
Rank	Name	League	Relegation play-offs	Cup	Total
1	(Croatia) Josip Čondrić	6	1	–	7
TOTALS		6	1	0	7

Source: Competitive matches

=== Disciplinary record ===
Number	Position	Player	1. HNL			Relegation play-offs			Croatian Cup			Total		
Number	Position	Player	Yellow card	(yellow card) (yellow-red card)	Red card	Yellow card	(yellow card) (yellow-red card)	Red card	Yellow card	(yellow card) (yellow-red card)	Red card	Yellow card	(yellow card) (yellow-red card)	Red card
1	GK	(Spain) Ioritz Landeta	1	0	0	0	0	0	0	0	0	1	0	0
2	DF	(Brazil) Maicon da Silva	2	0	0	0	0	0	0	0	0	2	0	0
2	DF	(Argentina) Tomás Oneto	4	0	0	0	0	0	2	0	0	6	0	0
3	DF	(Croatia) Petar Rubić	5	0	0	0	0	0	0	0	0	5	0	0
4	DF	(Spain) Julio Rodríguez	6	0	0	1	0	0	0	0	0	7	0	0
5	DF	(Croatia) Tomislav Čuljak	1	0	0	0	0	0	0	0	0	1	0	0
6	DF	(Croatia) Petar Bosančić	6	0	0	0	0	0	0	0	0	6	0	0
7	MF	(Spain) Dani Iglesias	4	0	0	1	0	0	0	0	0	5	0	0
8	MF	(France) Michel Espinosa	2	0	0	0	0	0	0	0	0	2	0	0
8	MF	(Spain) Einar Galilea	6	0	0	1	0	0	0	0	0	7	0	0
9	MF	(Spain) Adrián Fuentes	3	0	0	0	0	0	0	0	0	3	0	0
10	FW	(Lithuania) Karolis Laukžemis	2	0	0	0	0	0	0	0	0	2	0	0
11	MF	(Cameroon) Dani Ndi	0	1	0	0	0	0	0	0	0	0	1	0
13	FW	(Argentina) Ramón Miérez	7	1	0	0	0	0	1	0	0	8	1	0
14	MF	(Panama) José Luis Rodríguez	2	0	0	0	0	0	0	0	0	2	0	0
15	DF	(Croatia) Martin Franić	1	0	1	0	0	0	0	0	0	1	0	1
16	DF	(North Macedonia) Agron Rufati	3	0	0	0	0	0	0	0	0	3	0	0
17	MF	(Senegal) Arona Sané	7	0	0	0	0	0	0	0	0	7	0	0
18	FW	(Croatia) Robert Perić-Komšić	1	0	0	1	0	0	0	0	0	2	0	0
20	MF	(Croatia) Antonio Ivančić	1	0	0	0	0	0	0	0	0	1	0	0
22	DF	(Croatia) Marin Grujević	2	0	1	0	0	0	0	0	0	2	0	1
23	MF	(Argentina) Agustín Cardozo	5	1	0	0	0	0	1	0	0	6	1	0
23	MF	(Montenegro) Stefan Lončar	3	0	0	0	0	0	0	0	0	3	0	0
24	DF	(Austria) Markus Pavić	3	0	1	1	0	0	0	0	0	4	0	1
24	MF	(Spain) Arturo Segado	3	0	0	0	0	0	0	0	0	3	0	0
25	DF	(French Guiana) Kévin Rimane	4	0	0	0	0	0	0	0	0	4	0	0
26	MF	(Ghana) Obeng Regan	5	0	0	1	0	0	1	0	0	7	0	0
28	MF	(Venezuela) Octavio Páez	1	0	0	0	0	0	0	0	0	1	0	0
28	FW	(Mali) Moha Traoré	9	0	0	0	0	0	2	0	0	11	0	0
30	MF	(Croatia) Hisa Ramadani	1	0	0	0	0	0	0	0	0	1	0	0
31	MF	(Croatia) Toni Burić	1	0	0	0	0	0	0	0	0	1	0	0
32	MF	(Spain) Madger Gomes	2	0	0	0	0	0	0	0	0	2	0	0
34	FW	(Brazil) Bruno Sávio	1	0	0	0	0	0	0	0	0	1	0	0
TOTALS			104	3	3	6	0	0	7	0	0	117	3	3

=== Appearances and goals ===
Number	Position	Player	Apps	Goals	Apps	Goals	Apps	Goals	Apps	Goals
Number	Position	Player	Total		1. HNL (Note: First number represents appearances in starting eleven, while the second number indicates a substitute appearance.)		Relegation play-offs		Croatian Cup	
1	GK	(Spain) Ioritz Landeta	6	0	5+0	0	0+0	0	1+0	0
2	DF	(Brazil) Maicon da Silva	9	0	4+5	0	0+0	0	0+0	0
2	DF	(Argentina) Tomás Oneto	12	0	10+0	0	0+0	0	2+0	0
3	DF	(Croatia) Petar Rubić	20	1	14+4	1	1+0	0	1+0	0
4	DF	(Spain) Julio Rodríguez	24	1	21+1	1	2+0	0	0+0	0
5	DF	(Croatia) Tomislav Čuljak	8	0	6+1	0	0+0	0	1+0	0
6	DF	(Croatia) Petar Bosančić	27	0	23+0	0	2+0	0	1+1	0
7	MF	(Spain) Dani Iglesias	22	1	10+10	1	2+0	0	0+0	0
8	MF	(France) Michel Espinosa	8	0	5+3	0	0+0	0	0+0	0
8	MF	(Spain) Einar Galilea	14	0	10+2	0	2+0	0	0+0	0
9	MF	(Spain) Adrián Fuentes	21	6	8+9	4	2+0	2	1+1	0
10	FW	(Lithuania) Karolis Laukžemis	12	1	5+6	1	0+1	0	0+0	0
11	MF	(Cameroon) Dani Ndi	11	2	8+3	2	0+0	0	0+0	0
11	MF	(Croatia) Goran Roce	2	0	1+1	0	0+0	0	0+0	0
12	GK	(Croatia) Josip Čondrić	34	0	31+0	0	2+0	0	1+0	0
13	FW	(Argentina) Ramón Miérez	23	10	19+3	9	0+0	0	1+0	1
14	MF	(Democratic Republic of the Congo) Jordan Nkololo	2	0	1+1	0	0+0	0	0+0	0
14	MF	(Panama) José Luis Rodríguez	9	1	8+0	1	0+0	0	1+0	0
15	DF	(Croatia) Martin Franić	17	0	12+2	0	1+1	0	1+0	0
16	DF	(North Macedonia) Agron Rufati	19	0	15+1	0	2+0	0	1+0	0
17	MF	(Senegal) Arona Sané	25	1	21+2	0	0+0	0	2+0	1
18	FW	(Croatia) Robert Perić-Komšić	18	3	7+9	3	0+1	0	0+1	0
18	FW	(Argentina) Luis Vila	6	0	0+6	0	0+0	0	0+0	0
20	MF	(Croatia) Antonio Ivančić	21	5	15+2	2	2+0	1	2+0	2
22	DF	(Croatia) Marin Grujević	29	1	25+2	1	1+1	0	0+0	0
23	MF	(Argentina) Agustín Cardozo	14	0	12+1	0	0+0	0	1+0	0
23	MF	(Montenegro) Stefan Lončar	16	0	11+3	0	1+1	0	0+0	0
24	DF	(Austria) Markus Pavić	16	1	14+1	1	1+0	0	0+0	0
24	MF	(Spain) Arturo Segado	16	0	9+5	0	0+0	0	1+1	0
25	MF	(South Korea) Kim Young-gyu	3	0	0+2	0	0+0	0	1+0	0
25	DF	(French Guiana) Kévin Rimane	9	0	8+1	0	0+0	0	0+0	0
26	MF	(Ghana) Obeng Regan	32	4	26+3	4	1+0	0	1+1	0
27	FW	(Croatia) Vice Miljanić	2	0	2+0	0	0+0	0	0+0	0
28	MF	(Venezuela) Octavio Páez	4	0	1+2	0	0+1	0	0+0	0
28	FW	(Mali) Moha Traoré	16	1	10+4	0	0+0	0	2+0	1
29	MF	(Ecuador) Jonathan Caicedo	7	0	1+5	0	0+0	0	0+1	0
29	DF	(France) Nicolas Senzemba	3	0	3+0	0	0+0	0	0+0	0
30	MF	(Croatia) Hisa Ramadani	2	0	1+1	0	0+0	0	0+0	0
31	MF	(Croatia) Toni Burić	6	0	5+1	0	0+0	0	0+0	0
32	MF	(Spain) Madger Gomes	5	0	5+0	0	0+0	0	0+0	0
34	FW	(Brazil) Bruno Sávio	9	0	4+5	0	0+0	0	0+0	0
