= 2019–20 NK Istra 1961 season =

NK Istra 1961
2019–20 season
- Owner: Baskonia - Alavés Group
- Manager: Igor Cvitanović (until 11 June 2019); Ivan Prelec (since 15 June 2019)
- Stadium: Stadion Aldo Drosina
- Prva HNL: 9th (play-off winners)
- Croatian Cup: Second round
- Top goalscorer: League: Mario Ćuže (7); All: Mario Ćuže (8)
- Highest home attendance: 4,569 v Hajduk Split (29 September 2019)
- Lowest home attendance: 434 v Inter Zaprešić (30 October 2019)
- Average home league attendance: 1,321
Home colours	Away colours

The 2019–20 NK Istra 1961 season was the club's 59th season in existence and the 11th consecutive season in the top flight of Croatian football.

== First-team squad ==
As of 5 August 2020

Note: Flags indicate national team as defined under FIFA eligibility rules; some limited exceptions apply. Players may hold more than one non-FIFA nationality.

No.	Pos.	Nation	Player
1	GK	CRO	Tony Macan
2	MF	CRO	Mario Munivrana
4	DF	ESP	Rafael Páez (on loan from Deportivo Alavés)
5	DF	MKD	Agron Rufati
6	DF	CRO	Petar Bosančić
7	FW	CRO	Šime Gržan
8	MF	ESP	Einar Galilea (on loan from Deportivo Alavés)
9	MF	ESP	Adrián Fuentes (on loan from Deportivo Alavés)
10	FW	BIH	Gedeon Guzina
11	FW	CRO	Josip Maganjić (on loan from Fiorentina)
12	GK	CRO	Josip Čondrić
13	FW	CRO	Ivan Delić (on loan from Hajduk Split)
14	MF	CRO	Denis Bušnja (on loan from Rijeka)
15	DF	CRO	Martin Franić
16	MF	CRO	Ivan Močinić
17	MF	SEN	Arona Sané

No.	Pos.	Nation	Player
18	FW	CRO	Robert Perić-Komšić
20	MF	CRO	Antonio Ivančić
21	GK	CRO	Lovro Majkić
22	DF	CRO	Marin Grujević (captain)
23	MF	MNE	Stefan Lončar (on loan from Deportivo Alavés)
24	DF	AUT	Markus Pavić
26	MF	GHA	Obeng Regan
27	DF	CRO	Josip Tomašević
28	MF	VEN	Octavio Páez
29	DF	ESP	Sergi González (on loan from Deportivo Alavés)
30	MF	CRO	Matija Fintić (on loan from Dinamo Zagreb)
31	MF	CRO	Toni Burić
33	MF	ALB	Drilon Sadiku
34	MF	CRO	Mateo Lisica
40	GK	CRO	Tomislav Duka
77	MF	CRO	Slavko Blagojević

== Transfers ==
=== In ===
Pos	Player	Transferred from	Fee	Date	Source
MF	(Spain) Adrián Fuentes	(Spain) Deportivo Alavés	Loan	26 June 2019	
MF	(South Korea) Kim Young-gyu	(Spain) El Ejido	Back from loan	30 June 2019	
FW	(Croatia) Vice Miljanić	(Slovenia) Brda	Back from loan	30 June 2019	
MF	(Panama) José Luis Rodríguez	(Spain) Deportivo Alavés B	Back from loan	30 June 2019	
FW	(Mali) Moha Traoré	(Spain) Melilla	Back from loan	30 June 2019	
MF	(Croatia) Mario Munivrana	(Croatia) Međimurje	Free	5 July 2019	
MF	(Spain) Einar Galilea	(Spain) Deportivo Alavés	Loan	9 July 2019	
DF	(Croatia) Josip Tomašević	(Slovenia) Rudar Velenje	Free	12 July 2019	
FW	(Croatia) Šime Gržan	(Bosnia and Herzegovina) GOŠK Gabela	Free	12 July 2019	
FW	(Croatia) Mario Ćuže	(Croatia) Dinamo Zagreb II	Loan	15 July 2019	
DF	(Spain) Rafael Páez	(Spain) Deportivo Alavés	Loan	2 August 2019	
DF	(Spain) Sergi González	(Spain) Deportivo Alavés	Loan	20 August 2019	
MF	(Croatia) Ivan Močinić	(Austria) Rapid Wien	Free	23 August 2019	
MF	(Croatia) Matija Fintić	(Croatia) Dinamo Zagreb II	Loan	2 September 2019	
MF	(Croatia) Denis Bušnja	(Croatia) Rijeka	Loan	2 September 2019	
FW	(Croatia) Josip Maganjić	(Italy) Fiorentina Primavera	Loan	2 September 2019	
GK	(Croatia) Tomislav Duka	(Croatia) Hajduk Split	Free	24 Jan 2020	
MF	(Croatia) Slavko Blagojević	(Latvia) RFS	Free	24 January 2020	
FW	(Bosnia and Herzegovina) Gedeon Guzina	(Bosnia and Herzegovina) Sarajevo	Free	7 February 2020	
FW	(Croatia) Ivan Delić	(Croatia) Hajduk Split	Loan	10 February 2020	
DF	(Croatia) Petar Rubić	(Croatia) Hrvatski Dragovoljac	Back from loan	30 June 2020	
FW	(Croatia) Vice Miljanić	(Croatia) Jadran Poreč	Back from loan	30 June 2020	
FW	(Croatia) Hisa Ramadani	(Croatia) Rovinj	Back from loan	30 June 2020	
FW	(Lithuania) Karolis Laukžemis	(Slovenia) Tabor Sežana	Back from loan	31 July 2020	

Source: Glasilo Hrvatskog nogometnog saveza

=== Out ===
Pos	Player	Transferred from	Fee	Date	Source
MF	(Spain) Adrián Fuentes	(Spain) Deportivo Alavés B	Back from loan	12 June 2019	
MF	(Spain) Einar Galilea	(Spain) Deportivo Alavés	Back from loan	12 June 2019	
MF	(Spain) Dani Iglesias	(Spain) Deportivo Alavés B	Back from loan	12 June 2019	
DF	(French Guiana) Kévin Rimane	(France) Paris Saint-Germain	Back from loan	14 June 2019	
FW	(Argentina) Ramón Miérez	(Argentina) Tigre	Back from loan	14 June 2019	
MF	(Spain) Madger Gomes	(England) Doncaster Rovers	Free	20 June 2019	
DF	(Croatia) Tomislav Čuljak	No team	Free	1 July 2019	
DF	(Brazil) Maicon da Silva	No team	Free	1 July 2019	
MF	(Cameroon) Dani Ndi	No team	Free	1 July 2019	
FW	(Brazil) Bruno Sávio	(Portugal) Louletano	Back from loan	1 July 2019	
MF	(South Korea) Kim Young-gyu	No team	Free	3 July 2019	
MF	(Panama) José Luis Rodríguez	(Spain) Deportivo Alavés B	Free	11 July 2019	
FW	(Mali) Moha Traoré	(Spain) Hércules	Free	15 July 2019	
GK	(Spain) Ioritz Landeta	(Spain) Sestao River Club	Free	22 July 2019	
DF	(Spain) Julio Rodríguez	(Romania) Voluntari	Free	24 July 2019	
FW	(Croatia) Vice Miljanić	(Croatia) Jadran Poreč	Loan	7 August 2019	
MF	(Croatia) Hisa Ramadani	(Croatia) Rovinj	Loan	16 August 2019	
FW	(Croatia) Elvis Trešnjić	(Croatia) Uljanik	Back from loan	16 August 2019	
FW	(Croatia) Mario Ćuže	(Croatia) Dinamo Zagreb II	Recalled from loan	20 January 2020	
FW	(Lithuania) Karolis Laukžemis	(Slovenia) Tabor Sežana	Loan	28 January 2020	
DF	(Croatia) Petar Rubić	(Croatia) Hrvatski Dragovoljac	Loan	14 February 2020	
DF	(Croatia) Petar Rubić	No team	Free	12 June 2020	

Source: Glasilo Hrvatskog nogometnog saveza

Total spending: ▼€0

Total income: ▲€0

Total expenditure: ▲€0

== Competitions ==
=== Overview ===
Competition	First match	Last match	Starting round	Final position	Record							
Competition	First match	Last match	Starting round	Final position	Pld	W	D	L	GF	GA	GD	Win %
HT Prva liga	21 July 2019	25 July 2020	Matchday 1	9th	36	5	10	21	27	59	−32	13.89
Relegation play-offs	2 August 2020	5 August 2020	First leg	Winners	2	1	0	1	3	1	+2	50.00
Croatian Cup	25 September 2019	30 October 2019	First round	Second round	2	1	0	1	4	4	+0	50.00
Total					40	7	10	23	34	64	−30	17.50

Last updated: 6 April 2021
Source: Soccerway

=== HT Prva liga ===
==== League table ====
Pos	Team	Pld	W	D	L	GF	GA	GD	Pts	Qualification or relegation
6	Gorica	36	12	13	11	44	48	−4	49	
7	Slaven Belupo	36	10	9	17	34	51	−17	39	
8	Varaždin	36	9	9	18	29	50	−21	36	
9	Istra 1961 (O)	36	5	10	21	27	59	−32	25	Qualification for the Relegation play-offs
10	Inter Zaprešić (R)	36	3	8	25	32	72	−40	17	Relegation to Croatian Second Football League

Source: PrvaHNL.hr
Rules for classification: 1) Points; 2) Head-to-head points; 3) Head-to-head goal difference; 4) Head-to-head goals scored (at home if two teams tied); 5) Goal difference; 6) Goals scored; 7) Play-off
(Note: Criteria 2-4 and 7 is only used if deciding champion, teams to international competition or teams for relegation and in that case criteria 6 will not be used).
(O) Play-off winners; (R) Relegated

==== Results summary ====
Overall								Home						Away					
Pld	W	D	L	GF	GA	GD	Pts	W	D	L	GF	GA	GD	W	D	L	GF	GA	GD
36	5	10	21	27	59	−32	25	4	8	6	20	24	−4	1	2	15	7	35	−28

Last updated: 4 April 2021.
Source: Competitive matches

==== Results by round ====
Round	1	2	3	4	5	6	7	8	9	10	11	12	13	14	15	16	17	18	19	20	21	22	23	24	25	26	27	28	29	30	31	32	33	34	35	36
Ground	A	A	H	A	H	A	H	A	H	H	H	A	H	A	H	A	H	A	A	A	H	A	H	A	H	A	H	H	H	A	H	A	H	A	H	A
Result	L	W	W	L	L	D	D	L	L	D	D	L	L	D	D	L	L	L	L	L	W	L	D	L	W	L	L	L	W	L	D	L	D	L	D	L
Position	8	6	5	6	6	6	7	7	8	8	7	7	8	8	7	8	8	8	9	9	9	9	9	9	8	8	8	8	8	9	9	9	9	9	9	9

Updated to match(es) played on 25 July 2020. Source: Prva HNL
A = Away; H = Home; W = Win; D = Draw; L = Loss

==== Matches ====
21 July 2019 1	Hajduk Split	2–0	Istra 1961	Split
20:00 CEST (UTC+02:00)	Simić 8'; Caktaš (yellow card) 35'; Nejašmić (yellow card) 82'; Barry 88'	Report	Rufati (yellow card) 74'	Stadium: Stadion Poljud; Attendance: 8,248; Referee: Tihomir Pejin

26 July 2019 2	Inter Zaprešić	0–2	Istra 1961	Zaprešić
20:00 CEST (UTC+02:00)	Mazalović (yellow card) 53'; Serderov (yellow card) 71'; Mlinar (yellow card) 73'; Galić (yellow card) 79'	Report	Gržan (yellow card) 26'; Galilea (yellow card) 34' (yellow-red card) 84'; Munivrana (yellow card) 80'; Ćuže 83' 90+3'	Stadium: Stadion ŠRC Zaprešić; Attendance: 400; Referee: Duje Strukan

3 August 2019 3	Istra 1961	3–1	Varaždin	Pula
19:00 CEST (UTC+02:00)	Ćuže 8' 48' 73'; Perić-Komšić (yellow card) 38'; Pavić (yellow card) 51'; Grujević (yellow card) 76'	Report	Senić (yellow card) 8'; Sambolec (yellow card) 35'; Stolnik (yellow card) 52'; Milićević (yellow card) 54'; Benko 59' (pen.)	Stadium: Stadion Aldo Drosina; Attendance: 1,922; Referee: Igor Pajač

10 August 2019 4	Lokomotiva	4–1	Istra 1961	Zagreb
21:00 CEST (UTC+02:00)	Datković 34'; Ivanušec 38'; Uzuni (yellow card) 58'; Drožđek 84'; Kastrati 86'	Report	Tomašević (yellow card) 64'; Ćuže 79'	Stadium: Stadion Kranjčevićeva; Attendance: 522; Referee: Dario Kulušić

17 August 2019 5	Istra 1961	2–3	Slaven Belupo	Pula
21:00 CEST (UTC+02:00)	Gržan 15' (pen.); Galilea (yellow card) 32'; Regan 35'; Fuentes (yellow card) 38'; Perić-Komšić (yellow card) 69'; Grujević (yellow card) 90+2'	Report	Krstanović 12' 42'; Paracki (yellow card) 14'; Međimorec (yellow card) 28'; Puclin 60' (yellow card) 64'	Stadium: Stadion Aldo Drosina; Attendance: 2,027; Referee: Fran Jović

25 August 2019 6	Gorica	1–1	Istra 1961	Velika Gorica
18:00 CEST (UTC+02:00)	Suk (yellow card) 45'; Hamad 53'; Zwoliński (yellow card) 66'	Report	Bosančić 6'; Galilea (yellow card) 74'	Stadium: Stadion Radnik; Attendance: 2,431; Referee: Ivan Bebek

31 August 2019 7	Istra 1961	0–0	Osijek	Pula
21:00 CEST (UTC+02:00)	Lončar (yellow card) 21'	Report	Lyopa (yellow card) 27'; Bočkaj (yellow card) 42'	Stadium: Stadion Aldo Drosina; Attendance: 1,956; Referee: Marko Matoc

13 September 2019 8	Dinamo Zagreb	1–0	Istra 1961	Zagreb
18:00 CEST (UTC+02:00)	Gavranović 53'; Ivanušec (yellow card) 73'	Report	Bušnja (yellow card) 72'	Stadium: Stadion Maksimir; Attendance: 2,700; Referee: Igor Pajač

22 September 2019 9	Istra 1961	0–3	Rijeka	Pula
19:00 CEST (UTC+02:00)	Ivančić (yellow card) 10' (yellow-red card) 41'	Report	Andrijašević 6'; Lončar 45'; Escoval (yellow card) 60'; Halilović (yellow card) 70'; Murić 77'	Stadium: Stadion Aldo Drosina; Attendance: 2,797; Referee: Igor Pajač

29 September 2019 10	Istra 1961	1–1	Hajduk Split	Pula
19:00 CEST (UTC+02:00)	Galilea (yellow card) 18'; Pavić (yellow card) 68'; Lončar 80' (yellow card) 80'; Čondrić (yellow card) 88'	Report	Jradi (yellow card) 14'; Caktaš 35' (yellow card) 75'; Bradarić (yellow card) 42'; Simić (yellow card) 88'	Stadium: Stadion Aldo Drosina; Attendance: 4,569; Referee: Fran Jović

4 October 2019 11	Istra 1961	2–2	Inter Zaprešić	Pula
18:00 CEST (UTC+02:00)	Ivančić 47' 56'; Regan (yellow card) 79'; Grujević (yellow card) 89'	Report	Grgić 6'; Frelih 90+4'	Stadium: Stadion Aldo Drosina; Attendance: 1,555; Referee: Fran Jović

19 October 2019 12	NK Varaždin	1–0	Istra 1961	Varaždin
15:00 CEST (UTC+02:00)	Guera Djou (yellow card) 24'; Adžić (yellow card) 35'; Benko 87'	Report	Močinić (yellow card) 90+1'	Stadium: Stadion Varteks; Attendance: 1,360; Referee: Dario Bel

27 October 2019 13	Istra 1961	0–2	Lokomotiva	Pula
15:00 CEST (UTC+02:00)	Bušnja (yellow card) 70'; Rufati (yellow card) 74'	Report	Kolinger (yellow card) 55'; Tolić 85'; Tuci (yellow card) 87' (goal) 90+2'	Stadium: Stadion Aldo Drosina; Attendance: 1,420; Referee: Marko Matoc

3 November 2019 14	Slaven Belupo	0–0	Istra 1961	Koprivnica
15:00 CET (UTC+01:00)	Glavčić (yellow card) 57'; Goda (yellow card) 65'; Božić (yellow card) 83'; Ejupi (yellow card) 90+3'	Report	Bušnja (yellow card) 22'; Bosančić (yellow card) 48'; Galilea (yellow card) 86'	Stadium: Gradski stadion Attendance: 867; Referee: Ivan Bebek

8 November 2019 15	Istra 1961	2–2	Gorica	Pula
18:00 CET (UTC+01:00)	Laukžemis 3' (yellow card) 74'; Močinić 62'	Report	Steenvoorden (yellow card) 16'; Jovičić 37'; Čanađija (yellow card) 58'; Muhammed (yellow card) 77'; Marina (yellow card) 90'; Ndiaye 90+4'	Stadium: Stadion Aldo Drosina; Attendance: 699; Referee: Duje Strukan

24 November 2019 16	Osijek	1–0	Istra 1961	Osijek
15:00 CET (UTC+01:00)	Mbakogu (yellow card) 4'; Igor Silva (yellow card) 67'; Talys (yellow card) 75'; Marić 90+4' (pen.)	Report	Bosančić (yellow card) 15'; Pavić (yellow card) 26' (yellow-red card) 52'; Ćuže (yellow card) 70'; Čondrić (yellow card) 84'; Sergi (yellow card) 90+4'	Stadium: Gradski Vrt Stadium; Attendance: 2,455; Referee: Duje Strukan

30 November 2019 17	Istra 1961	1–2	Dinamo Zagreb	Pula
17:30 CET (UTC+01:00)	Regan (yellow card) 25'; Galilea (yellow card) 57'; Ćuže 90' (pen.)	Report	Kądzior 22'; Šitum (yellow card) 42'; Oršić 49'; Zagorac (yellow card) 90'; Moro (yellow card) 90+3'	Stadium: Stadion Aldo Drosina; Attendance: 2,462; Referee: Duje Strukan

8 December 2019 18	Rijeka	2–0	Istra 1961	Rijeka
17:30 CET (UTC+01:00)	Gorgon 15'; Murić 28'	Report	Galilea (yellow card) 34'; Tomašević (yellow card) 57'; Bosančić (yellow card) 69'; Gržan (yellow card) 71'; Regan (yellow card) 74'	Stadium: Stadion Rujevica; Attendance: 4,045; Referee: Igor Pajač

15 December 2019 19	Hajduk Split	2–1	Istra 1961	Split
17:30 CET (UTC+01:00)	Tahiraj (yellow card) 11'; Jairo (yellow card) 15'; Simić (yellow card) 38'; Caktaš 62', 69'	Report	Pavić (yellow card) 28'; Fintić 43'; Rubić (red card) 90+1'	Stadium: Stadion Poljud; Attendance: 6,262; Referee: Ivan Bebek

31 January 2020 20	Inter Zaprešić	2–0	Istra 1961	Zaprešić
18:00 CET (UTC+01:00)	Mitrović 11'; Bosančić 26' (o.g.); Postonjski (yellow card) 38'; Tsonev (yellow card) 77'	Report	Blagojević (yellow card) 41'	Stadium: Stadion ŠRC Zaprešić; Attendance: 906; Referee: Ivan Bebek

7 February 2020 21	Istra 1961	1–0	Varaždin	Pula
18:00 CET (UTC+01:00)	Gržan 30'; Ivančić (yellow card) 75'	Report	Neven Đurasek (yellow card) 78'; Benko (yellow card) 85'	Stadium: Stadion Aldo Drosina; Attendance: 625; Referee: Damir Batinić

14 February 2020 22	Lokomotiva	2–0	Istra 1961	Zagreb
18:00 CET (UTC+01:00)	Tolić (yellow card) 3'; Uzuni 63' 67'	Report	Galilea (yellow card) 5'; Blagojević (yellow card) 8'; R. Páez (yellow card) 80'	Stadium: Stadion Kranjčevićeva; Attendance: 320; Referee: Duje Strukan

23 February 2020 23	Istra 1961	1–1	Slaven Belupo	Pula
17:30 CET (UTC+01:00)	R. Páez 4'; Tomašević (yellow card) 82'	Report	Mateus (yellow card) 23'; Krstanović 33' (yellow card) 46'; Božić (yellow card) 64'; Jeffrén (yellow card) 84'	Stadium: Stadion Aldo Drosina; Attendance: 830; Referee: Ivan Vučković

28 February 2020 24	Gorica	3–0	Istra 1961	Velika Gorica
19:00 CET (UTC+01:00)	Čanađija (yellow card) 40'; Dvorneković 57'; Masłowski 80'; Lovrić 90+3'	Report	Blagojević (yellow card) 21'; Galilea (yellow card) 28'; R. Páez (yellow card) 49'; Grujević (yellow card) 82'	Stadium: Stadion Radnik; Attendance: 791; Referee: Tihomir Pejin

4 March 2020 25	Istra 1961	1–0	Osijek	Pula
15:00 CET (UTC+01:00)	Delić 2'; Pavić (yellow card) 28'; Regan (yellow card) 42'; Ivančić (yellow card) 72'; Galilea (yellow card) 87'	Report	Majstorović (yellow card) 39'	Stadium: Stadion Aldo Drosina; Attendance: 603; Referee: Mario Zebec

8 March 2020 26	Dinamo Zagreb	2–0	Istra 1961	Zagreb
15:00 CET (UTC+01:00)	Dilaver 2'; Leovac (yellow card) 11'; Stojanović (yellow card) 47'; Majer 69'; Moro (yellow card) 89'	Report	Tomašević (yellow card) 48'; Regan (yellow card) 68'	Stadium: Stadion Maksimir; Attendance: 2,474; Referee: Dario Kulušić

7 June 2020 27	Istra 1961	1–3	Rijeka	Pula
18:55 CEST (UTC+02:00)	Galilea (yellow card) 3'; Perić-Komšić 88'; Gržan (yellow card) 89'	Report	Lončar 4'; Čolak 70'; Murić 90+3'	Stadium: Stadion Aldo Drosina; Attendance: 0 Referee: Dario Bel

11 June 2020 28	Istra 1961	0–1	Hajduk Split	Pula
21:05 CEST (UTC+02:00)	Blagojević (yellow card) 47'; Regan (yellow card) 87'; Čondrić (yellow card) 90+1'; Močinić (yellow card) 90+1'	Report	Caktaš 6'; Ismajli (yellow card) 57'; Dolček (yellow card) 90'; Jradi (yellow card) 90+1'	Stadium: Stadion Aldo Drosina; Attendance: 0 Referee: Damir Batinić

16 June 2020 29	Istra 1961	2–0	Inter Zaprešić	Pula
18:55 CEST (UTC+02:00)	Bosančić 6'; Gržan 34' (pen.); Galilea (yellow card) 81'	Report	Mlinar (yellow card) 45'; van Bruggen (yellow card) 85'	Stadium: Stadion Aldo Drosina; Attendance: 902; Referee: Ivan Bebek

20 June 2020 30	NK Varaždin	3–0	Istra 1961	Varaždin
21:05 CEST (UTC+02:00)	Rodin (yellow card) 43'; Posavec (yellow card) 46'; Obregón 54'; Senić (yellow card) 77'; Drožđek 85'; Petković 90+5'	Report	Tomašević (yellow card) 90'	Stadium: Stadion Varteks; Attendance: 1,360; Referee: Dario Bel

25 June 2020 31	Istra 1961	1–1	Lokomotiva	Pula
18:55 CEST (UTC+02:00)	Guzina 14'; Blagojević (yellow card) 18'; Regan (yellow card) 38'; Antonio Ivančić (yellow card) 50'; Galilea (yellow card) 75'	Report	Kastrati 8'; Jakić (yellow card) 10'; Karačić (red card) 69'	Stadium: Stadion Aldo Drosina; Attendance: 665; Referee: Dario Bel

30 June 2020 32	Slaven Belupo	3–0	Istra 1961	Koprivnica
18:55 CEST (UTC+02:00)	Zirdum 13'; Krstanović 25'; Jeffrén 27'	Report	Lončar (yellow card) 61'; O. Páez (yellow card) 79'	Stadium: Gradski stadion Attendance: 502; Referee: Ivan Vučković

4 July 2020 33	Istra 1961	2–2	Gorica	Pula
18:55 CEST (UTC+02:00)	Grujević (yellow card) 6'; Gržan 45+2'; Delić 81'; Tomašević (yellow card) 90+4'	Report	Kalik (yellow card) 15'; Lovrić (yellow card) 21'; Babec (yellow card) 44'; Hamad 49'; Mudrinski 51'; Steenvoorden (yellow card) 69'	Stadium: Stadion Aldo Drosina; Attendance: 742; Referee: Ante Čuljak

11 July 2020 34	Osijek	2–0	Istra 1961	Osijek
21:05 CEST (UTC+02:00)	Žaper (yellow card) 4'; Ndockyt (yellow card) 39'; Lyopa (yellow card) 39' (goal) 45+2'; Špoljarić (yellow card) 55'; Mance 82'	Report	Močinić (yellow card) 31'; Čondrić (yellow card) 45+2'; Duka (yellow card) 74'	Stadium: Gradski Vrt Stadium; Attendance: 2,178; Referee: Marko Matoc

18 July 2020 35	Istra 1961	0–0	Dinamo Zagreb	Pula
21:05 CEST (UTC+02:00)	Blagojević (yellow card) 60'; R. Páez (yellow card) 60'; Galilea (yellow card) 66'; Grujević (yellow card) 76'; Bosančić (yellow card) 90+1'	Report		Stadium: Stadion Aldo Drosina; Attendance: 0 Referee: Igor Pajač

25 July 2020 36	Rijeka	4–2	Istra 1961	Rijeka
21:05 CEST (UTC+02:00)	Čolak 18' 24' 35' (pen.) 54'; Velkovski (yellow card) 78'	Report	Gržan (yellow card) 30'; Guzina 60' 78' (pen.); Rufati (yellow card) 61'; Tomašević (yellow card) 86'; Lončar (yellow card) 87'	Stadium: Stadion Rujevica; Attendance: 0 Referee: Mario Zebec

Source: Croatian Football Federation

==== Relegation play-offs ====
2 August 2020 First leg	Orijent 1919	0–3	Istra 1961	Rijeka
20:00 CEST (UTC+02:00)	Ivančević (red card) 23'; Gerc (yellow card) 88' (yellow-red card) 90+1'	Report	Gržan 8' (pen.) 64'; Močinić (yellow card) 28'; Blagojević (yellow card) 31'; Ivančić (red card) 89'; Čondrić (yellow card) 90+2'; Maganjić 90+3'	Stadium: Stadion Kantrida; Attendance: 0 Referee: Fran Jović

5 August 2020 Second leg	Istra 1961	0–1 (3–1 agg.)	Orijent 1919	Pula
20:00 CEST (UTC+02:00)	Sané (yellow card) 25'; Blagojević (yellow card) 63'; Močinić (yellow card) 90+3'	Report	Mohorovičić (yellow card) 34'; Iličić 49'; Monjac (yellow card) 82'; Fumić (yellow card) 89'; Črnko (yellow card) 90+2'	Stadium: Stadion Aldo Drosina; Attendance: 0 Referee: Igor Pajač
Note: Istra 1961 won on aggregate to secure a spot in the 2020–21 Croatian First Football League.

Source: Croatian Football Federation

=== Croatian Football Cup ===
25 September 2019 R1	Kurilovec	2–3 (a.e.t.)	Istra 1961	Velika Gorica
15:30 CEST (UTC+02:00)	Spudić 3'; Čurek 31' (yellow card) 90'; Sudar (yellow card) 102'	Report	Munivrana 29'; Lončar (yellow card) 55'; Rufati (yellow card) 60' (goal) 95'; Ćuže 64'; Regan (yellow card) 90'; Grujević (yellow card) 102'	Stadium: SRC Udarnik; Attendance: 300; Referee: Ivan Župan

30 October 2019 R2	Istra 1961	1–2	Inter Zaprešić	Pula
16:00 CET (UTC+01:00)	Ivančić 22' (yellow card) 32'; Franić (yellow card) 45+1'; Rufati (yellow card) 56'; Galilea (yellow card) 83'	Report	Grgić 19'; Mazalović (yellow card) 70'; Bosec (yellow card) 75'; Postonjski 76'; Mlinar (yellow card) 85'	Stadium: Stadion Aldo Drosina; Attendance: 434; Referee: Duje Strukan

Source: Croatian Football Federation

== Player seasonal records ==
Updated 6 April 2021

=== Goals ===
Rank	Name	League	Relegation play-offs	Cup	Total
1	(Croatia) Mario Ćuže	7	–	1	8
2	(Croatia) Šime Gržan	4	2	–	6
3	(Bosnia and Herzegovina) Gedeon Guzina	3	–	–	3
3	(Croatia) Antonio Ivančić	2	–	1	3
5	(Croatia) Petar Bosančić	2	–	–	2
5	(Croatia) Ivan Delić	2	–	–	2
7	(Croatia) Matija Fintić	1	–	–	1
7	(Lithuania) Karolis Laukžemis	1	–	–	1
7	(Montenegro) Stefan Lončar	1	–	–	1
7	(Croatia) Ivan Močinić	1	–	–	1
7	(Spain) Rafael Páez	1	–	–	1
7	(Croatia) Robert Perić-Komšić	1	–	–	1
7	(Ghana) Obeng Regan	1	–	–	1
7	(Croatia) Josip Maganjić	–	1	–	1
7	(Croatia) Mario Munivrana	–	–	1	1
7	(North Macedonia) Agron Rufati	–	–	1	1
TOTALS		27	3	4	34

Source: Competitive matches

=== Clean sheets ===
Rank	Name	League	Relegation play-offs	Cup	Total
1	(Croatia) Josip Čondrić	4	1	–	5
2	(Croatia) Tomislav Duka	2	–	–	2
3	(Croatia) Lovro Majkić	1	–	–	1
TOTALS		7	1	0	8

Source: Competitive matches

=== Disciplinary record ===
Number	Position	Player	1. HNL			Relegation play-offs			Croatian Cup			Total		
Number	Position	Player	Yellow card	(yellow card) (yellow-red card)	Red card	Yellow card	(yellow card) (yellow-red card)	Red card	Yellow card	(yellow card) (yellow-red card)	Red card	Yellow card	(yellow card) (yellow-red card)	Red card
2	MF	(Croatia) Mario Munivrana	1	0	0	0	0	0	0	0	0	1	0	0
3	DF	(Croatia) Petar Rubić	0	0	1	0	0	0	0	0	0	0	0	1
4	DF	(Spain) Rafael Páez	3	0	0	0	0	0	0	0	0	3	0	0
5	DF	(North Macedonia) Agron Rufati	3	0	0	0	0	0	2	0	0	5	0	0
6	DF	(Croatia) Petar Bosančić	4	0	0	0	0	0	0	0	0	4	0	0
7	FW	(Croatia) Šime Gržan	4	0	0	0	0	0	0	0	0	4	0	0
8	MF	(Spain) Einar Galilea	13	1	0	0	0	0	1	0	0	14	1	0
9	MF	(Spain) Adrián Fuentes	1	0	0	0	0	0	0	0	0	1	0	0
10	FW	(Lithuania) Karolis Laukžemis	1	0	0	0	0	0	0	0	0	1	0	0
12	GK	(Croatia) Josip Čondrić	4	0	0	1	0	0	0	0	0	5	0	0
14	MF	(Croatia) Denis Bušnja	3	0	0	0	0	0	0	0	0	3	0	0
15	DF	(Croatia) Martin Franić	0	0	0	0	0	0	1	0	0	1	0	0
16	MF	(Croatia) Ivan Močinić	3	0	0	2	0	0	0	0	0	5	0	0
17	MF	(Senegal) Arona Sané	0	0	0	1	0	0	0	0	0	1	0	0
18	FW	(Croatia) Robert Perić-Komšić	2	0	0	0	0	0	0	0	0	2	0	0
20	MF	(Croatia) Antonio Ivančić	3	1	0	0	0	1	1	0	0	4	1	1
22	DF	(Croatia) Marin Grujević	6	0	0	0	0	0	1	0	0	7	0	0
23	MF	(Montenegro) Stefan Lončar	4	0	0	0	0	0	1	0	0	5	0	0
24	DF	(Austria) Markus Pavić	4	1	0	0	0	0	0	0	0	4	1	0
25	FW	(Croatia) Mario Ćuže	1	0	0	0	0	0	0	0	0	1	0	0
26	MF	(Ghana) Obeng Regan	7	0	0	0	0	0	1	0	0	8	0	0
27	DF	(Croatia) Josip Tomašević	7	0	0	0	0	0	0	0	0	7	0	0
28	MF	(Venezuela) Octavio Páez	1	0	0	0	0	0	0	0	0	1	0	0
29	DF	(Spain) Sergi González	1	0	0	0	0	0	0	0	0	1	0	0
40	GK	(Croatia) Tomislav Duka	1	0	0	0	0	0	0	0	0	1	0	0
77	MF	(Croatia) Slavko Blagojević	6	0	0	2	0	0	0	0	0	8	0	0
TOTALS			83	3	1	6	0	1	8	0	0	97	3	2

=== Appearances and goals ===
Number	Position	Player	Apps	Goals	Apps	Goals	Apps	Goals	Apps	Goals
Number	Position	Player	Total		1. HNL (Note: First number represents appearances in starting eleven, while the second number indicates a substitute appearance.)		Relegation play-offs		Croatian Cup	
2	MF	(Croatia) Mario Munivrana	8	1	0+7	0	0+0	0	1+0	1
3	DF	(Croatia) Petar Rubić	7	0	1+4	0	0+0	0	2+0	0
4	DF	(Spain) Rafael Páez	10	1	6+2	1	2+0	0	0+0	0
5	DF	(North Macedonia) Agron Rufati	9	1	4+2	0	0+1	0	2+0	1
6	DF	(Croatia) Petar Bosančić	32	2	29+1	2	0+2	0	0+0	0
7	FW	(Croatia) Šime Gržan	37	6	31+2	4	2+0	2	1+1	0
8	MF	(Spain) Einar Galilea	33	0	29+2	0	1+0	0	0+1	0
9	MF	(Spain) Adrián Fuentes	8	0	4+4	0	0+0	0	0+0	0
10	FW	(Lithuania) Karolis Laukžemis	5	1	3+0	1	0+0	0	2+0	0
10	FW	(Bosnia and Herzegovina) Gedeon Guzina	16	3	12+2	3	2+0	0	0+0	0
11	FW	(Croatia) Josip Maganjić	10	1	2+7	0	0+1	1	0+0	0
12	GK	(Croatia) Josip Čondrić	29	0	27+0	0	2+0	0	0+0	0
13	FW	(Croatia) Ivan Delić	15	2	10+4	2	0+1	0	0+0	0
14	MF	(Croatia) Denis Bušnja	16	0	6+9	0	0+0	0	1+0	0
15	DF	(Croatia) Martin Franić	16	0	9+5	0	0+0	0	2+0	0
16	MF	(Croatia) Ivan Močinić	22	1	10+9	1	2+0	0	1+0	0
17	MF	(Senegal) Arona Sané	6	0	1+3	0	1+1	0	0+0	0
18	FW	(Croatia) Robert Perić-Komšić	26	1	7+18	1	0+0	0	0+1	0
20	MF	(Croatia) Antonio Ivančić	32	3	24+6	2	1+0	0	1+0	1
21	GK	(Croatia) Lovro Majkić	4	0	1+1	0	0+0	0	2+0	0
22	DF	(Croatia) Marin Grujević	31	0	27+1	0	2+0	0	0+1	0
23	MF	(Montenegro) Stefan Lončar	36	1	23+9	1	1+1	0	1+1	0
24	DF	(Austria) Markus Pavić	30	0	28+1	0	1+0	0	0+0	0
25	FW	(Croatia) Mario Ćuže	20	8	16+2	7	0+0	0	0+2	1
26	MF	(Ghana) Obeng Regan	22	1	15+5	1	0+0	0	2+0	0
27	DF	(Croatia) Josip Tomašević	35	0	31+0	0	2+0	0	2+0	0
28	MF	(Venezuela) Octavio Páez	2	0	0+2	0	0+0	0	0+0	0
29	DF	(Spain) Sergi González	11	0	8+1	0	1+0	0	1+0	0
30	MF	(Croatia) Matija Fintić	17	1	8+8	1	0+0	0	1+0	0
33	MF	(Albania) Drilon Sadiku	1	0	0+1	0	0+0	0	0+0	0
34	MF	(Croatia) Mateo Lisica	4	0	1+3	0	0+0	0	0+0	0
35	FW	(Croatia) Vice Miljanić	2	0	1+1	0	0+0	0	0+0	0
40	GK	(Croatia) Tomislav Duka	8	0	8+0	0	0+0	0	0+0	0
77	MF	(Croatia) Slavko Blagojević	16	0	14+0	0	2+0	0	0+0	0
