= Francisco Tena =

Francisco Tena may refer to:

- Francisco Tena (footballer, born 1901), Spanish football forward
- Francisco Tena (footballer, born 1993), Spanish football midfielder
