= Adrián Fuentes =

Spanish footballer

Personal information
- Full name: Adrián Fuentes González
- Date of birth: 17 July 1996 (age 30)
- Place of birth: Madrid, Spain
- Height: 1.88 m (6 ft 2 in)
- Positions: Forward; winger

Team information
- Current team: Mallorca

Youth career
- Moratalaz

Senior career*
Years	Team	Apps	(Gls)
2014–2015	Alhama	32	(14)
2016–2017	Lorca B	33	(18)
2017–2021	Alavés B	17	(12)
2018–2021	→ Istra 1961 (loan)	36	(4)
2021	Murcia	11	(1)
2021–2023	Córdoba	48	(15)
2023–2024	Castellón	10	(0)
2023–2024	→ Lugo (loan)	25	(0)
2024–2025	Tarazona	36	(16)
2025–2026	Córdoba	40	(14)
2026–	Mallorca	11	(6)
- * Club domestic league appearances and goals as of 24 October 2026

Adrián Fuentes González (born 17 July 1996) is a Spanish professional footballer who plays as either a forward or a left winger for RCD Mallorca.

== Club career ==
Born in Madrid, Fuentes was an ED Moratalaz youth graduate. In August 2015, he joined Tercera División side EF Alhama on a trial basis, subsequently signing a contract and making his senior debut during the campaign.

In July 2016, Fuentes joined Lorca FC and was assigned to the reserves also in the fourth division. Roughly one year later he moved to another reserve team, Deportivo Alavés B in the same category.

In July 2018, Fuentes was loaned to Alavés' affiliate club NK Istra 1961, for one season. He made his professional debut on 1 October, coming on as a late substitute for goalscorer Ramón Mierez in a 3–0 Croatian First Football League away win against NK Rudeš.

Fuentes' loan was renewed in 2019 and 2020, scoring four goals in 36 league games for the club from Pula. He also scored in both legs of a 3–1 aggregate win over HNK Šibenik to retain his team's place in the league in 2019, while his tenure was interrupted by injuries.

On 30 January 2021, Fuentes terminated his link with Alavés and moved to Real Murcia in Segunda División B. He joined Córdoba CF in the new fourth-tier Segunda División RFEF on 18 July, contributing 13 goals as promotion was won in his first season.

On 26 January 2023, Fuentes signed for CD Castellón also in Primera Federación. On 7 August, however, he was loaned to fellow third division side CD Lugo, for one year.

On 30 July 2024, SD Tarazona announced the signing of Fuentes. On 6 June of the following year, after scoring 16 goals during the campaign, he returned to Córdoba on a two-year deal, with the club now in Segunda División.

Fuentes continued his goalscoring form in the 2025–26 season, netting 14 goals and being Córdoba's top scorer. On 30 June 2026, he moved to fellow second division side RCD Mallorca on a four-year contract.

== Career statistics ==
As of match played 24 October 2026

Appearances and goals by club, season and competition
Club	Season	League			Cup		Other		Total	
Club	Season	Division	Apps	Goals	Apps	Goals	Apps	Goals	Apps	Goals
Alhama	2014–15	Tercera División	32	14	—		—		32	14
Lorca B	2016–17	Tercera División	33	18	—		—		33	18
Alavés B	2017–18	Tercera División	17	12	—		4 (Note: Two appearances in 2018 Tercera División play-offs, two appearances in Copa Federación de España)	0	21	12
Istra 1961 (loan)	2018–19	Croatian Football League	17	4	2	0	2 (Note: Appearances in relegation play-offs)	2	21	6
Istra 1961 (loan)	2019–20	Croatian Football League	8	0	0	0	—		8	0
Istra 1961 (loan)	2020–21	Croatian Football League	11	0	1	0	—		12	0
Istra 1961 (loan)	Total		36	4	3	0	2	2	41	6
Murcia	2020–21	Segunda División B	11	1	—		—		11	1
Córdoba	2021–22	Segunda Federación	33	13	1	0	5 (Note: Appearances in Copa Federación de España)	0	39	13
Córdoba	2022–23	Primera Federación	15	2	1	0	—		16	2
Córdoba	Total		48	15	2	0	5	0	55	15
Castellón	2022–23	Primera Federación	10	0	—		0	0	10	0
Lugo (loan)	2023–24	Primera Federación	25	0	3	1	—		28	1
Tarazona	2024–25	Primera Federación	36	16	—		—		36	16
Córdoba	2025–26	Segunda División	40	14	1	0	—		41	14
Mallorca	2026–27	Segunda División	11	6	0	0	—		11	6
Career total			299	100	9	1	11	2	319	103
