= Lovro Majkić =

Croatian association football player

Personal information
- Date of birth: 8 October 1999 (age 27)
- Place of birth: Zagreb, Croatia
- Height: 1.90 m (6 ft 3 in)
- Position: Goalkeeper

Team information
- Current team: Aris
- Number: 21

Youth career
- –2014: Zagreb
- 2014–2018: Rijeka

Senior career*
Years	Team	Apps	(Gls)
2018–2025	Istra 1961	112	(0)
2025–	Aris	2	(0)

International career^{‡}
2023	Croatia U23	1	(0)
- * Club domestic league appearances and goals as of 30 August 2025 ‡ National team caps and goals as of 9 June 2023

Lovro Majkić (born 8 October 1999) is a Croatian professional footballer who plays as a goalkeeper for Greek Super League club Aris.

== Career ==
After dealing with a string of injuries during his first few seasons with Istra 1961, Majkić finally got his chance and became the starting goalkeeper in May 2022.

== Personal life ==
Majkić is from Bistra.

== Career statistics ==
As of match played 1 July 2025

Club	Season	League			National Cup		Continental		Other		Total	
Club	Season	Division	Apps	Goals	Apps	Goals	Apps	Goals	Apps	Goals	Apps	Goals
Istra 1961	2019–20	Prva HNL	2	0	2	0	—		—		4	0
Istra 1961	2020–21	Prva HNL	8	0	0	0	—		—		8	0
Istra 1961	2021–22	Prva HNL	2	0	0	0	—		—		2	0
Istra 1961	2022–23	Prva HNL	35	0	0	0	—		—		35	0
Istra 1961	2023–24	Prva HNL	34	0	0	0	—		—		34	0
Istra 1961	2024–25	Prva HNL	31	0	2	0	—		—		33	0
Istra 1961	Total		112	0	4	0	—		—		116	0
Career total			112	0	4	0	0	0	0	0	116	0
