= Arturo Segado =

Spanish footballer

Personal information
- Full name: Arturo Segado Muñoz
- Date of birth: 17 April 1997 (age 29)
- Place of birth: Andújar, Spain
- Height: 1.75 m (5 ft 9 in)
- Position: Midfielder

Team information
- Current team: Torre del Mar

Youth career
- 2004–2009: Betis Iliturgitano
- 2009–2011: La Cañada
- 2011–2016: Málaga

Senior career*
Years	Team	Apps	(Gls)
2016–2017	Málaga B	34	(1)
2017–2019	Alavés	0	(0)
2017–2018	→ Rudeš (loan)	26	(1)
2018	→ Istra 1961 (loan)	14	(0)
2019	Deportivo B	9	(0)
2019–2020	Badajoz	0	(0)
2020	→ Mérida (loan)	6	(0)
2020–2021	Leioa	26	(0)
2021–2023	Toledo	59	(0)
2024	Moscardó	21	(2)
2024–	Torre del Mar	6	(0)
- * Club domestic league appearances and goals as of 13 October 2024

Arturo Segado Muñoz (born 17 April 1997) is a Spanish footballer who plays for Torre del Mar as a midfielder.

== Career ==
Born in Andújar, Jaén, Andalusia, Segado finished his formation with Málaga CF. In 2016, he was promoted to the B-team. He played 34 matches and found the net once. He also captained the club's juvenile team which debuted in the UEFA Youth League.

In July 2017, Segado terminated his contract with Málaga. In the following month, he signed for Deportivo Alavés and was immediately loaned to Croatian side NK Rudeš for one year. He made his debut for the Croatian club in a 3–2 defeat against Dinamo Zagreb.

On 8 January 2019, after another loan stint at NK Istra 1961, Segado left the Glorioso and joined another reserve team, Deportivo Fabril in Segunda División B. On 3 September 2019 it was confirmed, that Segado had joined CD Badajoz. However, he did only play one game for the club in the Copa del Rey, before being loaned out to Mérida AD on the last day of the January 2020 market.
