= José Luis Rodríguez (footballer, born 1998) =

Panamanian footballer (born 1998)

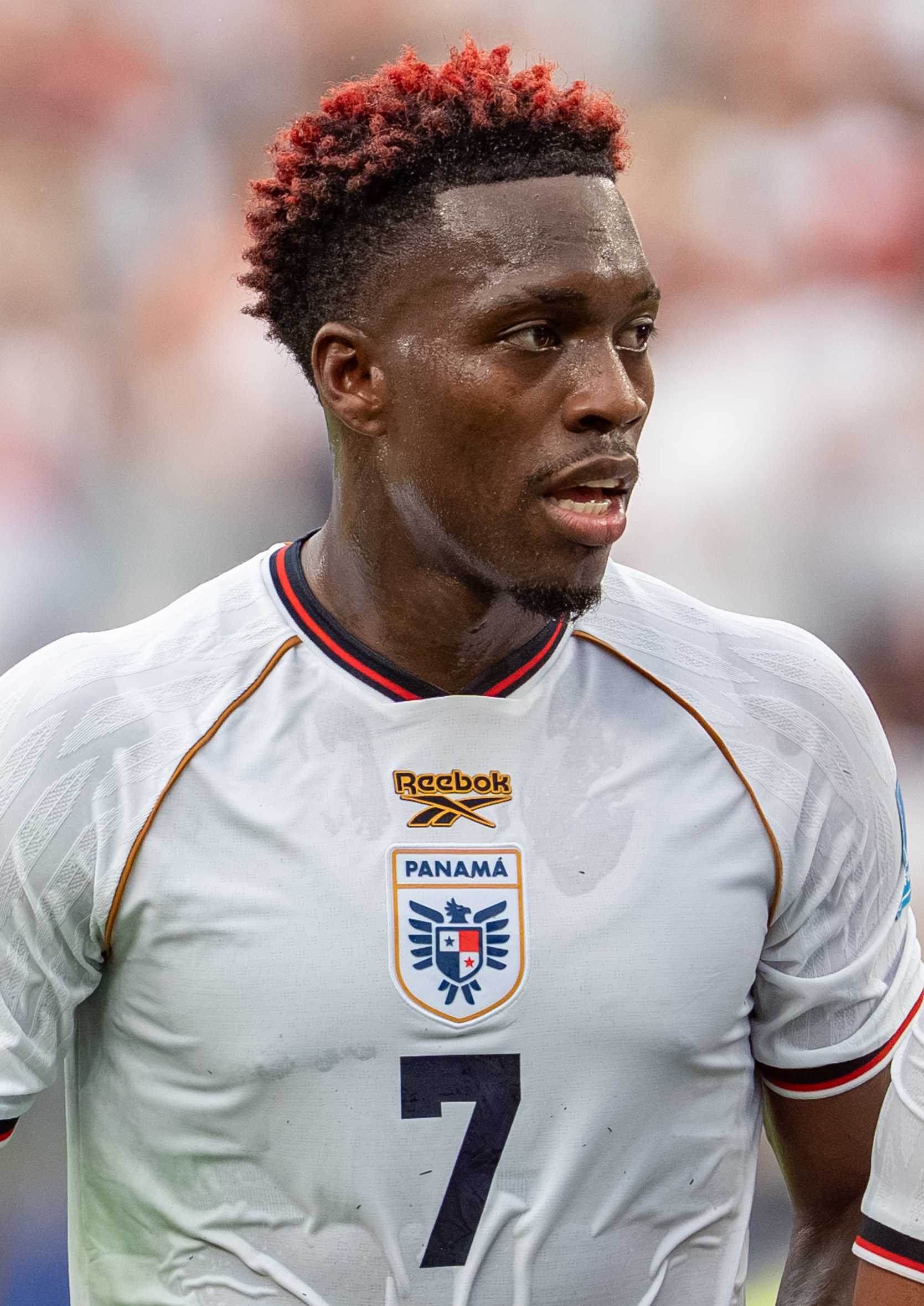
- Rodríguez with Panama in 2026

Personal information
- Full name: José Luis Rodríguez Francis
- Date of birth: 19 June 1998 (age 28)
- Place of birth: Panama City, Panama
- Height: 1.80 m (5 ft 11 in)
- Position: Winger

Team information
- Current team: Juárez
- Number: 11

Youth career
- Chorrillo

Senior career*
| Years | Team | Apps | (Gls) |
| 2015–2016 | Chorrillo | 16 | (1) |
| 2016 | → Gent II (loan) | 6 | (1) |
| 2016–2018 | Gent II | 44 | (7) |
| 2018 | Istra 1961 | 8 | (1) |
| 2019–2020 | Alavés B | 48 | (4) |
| 2020–2022 | Alavés | 1 | (0) |
| 2020–2021 | → Lugo (loan) | 26 | (5) |
| 2021–2022 | → Sporting Gijón (loan) | 35 | (3) |
| 2022–2024 | Famalicão | 30 | (2) |
| 2024–2025 | Red Star Belgrade | 5 | (1) |
| 2024–2025 | → Juárez (loan) | 9 | (0) |
| 2025– | Juárez | 63 | (6) |

International career^{‡}
| 2014–2015 | Panama U17 | 4+ | (1+) |
| 2018– | Panama | 75 | (8) |
- * Club domestic league appearances and goals as of 18:09, 18 September 2026 (UTC) ‡ National team caps and goals as of 17:30, 5 October 2026 (UTC)

José Luis Rodríguez Francis (born 19 June 1998), commonly known as Puma, is a Panamanian professional footballer who plays as a left winger for Liga MX club Juárez and the Panama national team.

== Personal life ==
Rodríguez grew up in El Chorrillo, Panama City and is the brother of retired Chorrillo captain Marcos Villarreal. He was nicknamed "Cocobolo" at a young age for his short hair.

== Club career ==
Rodríguez played for hometown club Chorrillo in his youth. In the 2015–16 season of the Liga Panameña de Fútbol, he made his debut on 17 July 2015 in a 0–1 away loss against Atlético Chiriquí. His first and only goal of the season came on 2 April 2016 in a 3–2 away win against Alianza, scoring the winning goal for Chorrillo in the 90th minute. In 2016, Rodríguez moved to the under-21 team of Belgium club Gent on loan with an option to buy. On 9 December 2016, Gent signed Rodríguez on a permanent deal, with a contract lasting until 2019. In September 2018 he signed for Croatian club Istra 1961.

On 1 February 2019, Rodríguez joined Deportivo Alavés and would play for their B-team. He made his first team – and La Liga – debut on 10 July of the following year, replacing Joselu in a 0–2 away loss against Real Madrid.

On 4 September 2020, Rodríguez renewed his contract with Alavés until 2022, and was immediately loaned to Segunda División side CD Lugo for the season. On 30 July of the following year, he moved to fellow league team Sporting de Gijón also in a temporary deal.

On 15 August 2022, Rodríguez signed a four-year contract with Primeira Liga side F.C. Famalicão.

== International career ==
Rodríguez was called up to the Panama under-17 team in 2014, scoring on 3 March 2015 against Haiti in the 2015 CONCACAF U-17 Championship.

On 14 May 2018, Rodríguez was included in Panama's preliminary squad for the 2018 FIFA World Cup, the country's first ever FIFA World Cup. Rodríguez made his international debut for Panama on 29 May 2018 in a 0–0 friendly home draw against Northern Ireland. The following day, Rodríguez was included in Panama's final 23-man World Cup squad.

Rodríguez made his World Cup debut in Panama's opening match on 18 June 2018 in a 0–3 loss to Belgium, starting the match before being substituted in the 63rd minute for Ismael Díaz.

== Career statistics ==
=== Club ===
As of match played 18 September 2026

Appearances and goals by club, season and competition
| Club | Season | League | | | National cup | | League Cup | | Continental | | Other | | Total | |
| Club | Season | Division | Apps | Goals | Apps | Goals | Apps | Goals | Apps | Goals | Apps | Goals | Apps | Goals |
|---|---|---|---|---|---|---|---|---|---|---|---|---|---|---|
| Chorrillo | 2015–16 | Liga LPF | 16 | 1 | 0 | 0 | — | | — | | — | | 16 | 1 |
| Istra 1961 | 2018–19 | Prva HNL | 8 | 1 | 1 | 0 | — | | — | | — | | 9 | 1 |
| Alavés B | 2018–19 | Tercera División | 13 | 3 | — | | — | | — | | — | | 13 | 3 |
| Alavés B | 2019–20 | Segunda División B | 24 | 2 | — | | — | | — | | — | | 24 | 2 |
| Alavés B | Total | | 37 | 5 | 0 | 0 | — | | — | | 0 | 0 | 37 | 5 |
| Alavés | 2019–20 | La Liga | 1 | 0 | 0 | 0 | — | | — | | — | | 1 | 0 |
| Lugo (loan) | 2020–21 | Segunda División | 26 | 5 | 0 | 0 | — | | — | | — | | 26 | 5 |
| Sporting Gijón (loan) | 2021–22 | Segunda División | 35 | 0 | 4 | 0 | — | | — | | — | | 39 | 0 |
| Famalicão | 2022–23 | Primeira Liga | 7 | 1 | 2 | 1 | 1 | 0 | — | | — | | 10 | 2 |
| Famalicão | 2023–24 | Primeira Liga | 23 | 1 | 1 | 0 | 0 | 0 | — | | — | | 24 | 1 |
| Famalicão | Total | | 30 | 2 | 3 | 1 | 1 | 0 | — | | — | | 34 | 3 |
| Red Star Belgrade | 2024–25 | Serbian SuperLiga | 5 | 1 | 0 | 0 | — | | 1 | 0 | 0 | 0 | 6 | 1 |
| Juárez (loan) | 2024–25 | Liga MX | 9 | 0 | — | | — | | — | | — | | 9 | 0 |
| Juárez | 2024–25 | Liga MX | 17 | 1 | — | | — | | — | | — | | 17 | 1 |
| Juárez | 2025–26 | Liga MX | 37 | 4 | 0 | 0 | — | | 0 | 0 | 3 (Note: Appearances in Leagues Cup) | 0 | 40 | 4 |
| Juárez | 2026–27 | Liga MX | 9 | 1 | 0 | 0 | — | | 0 | 0 | 3 | 0 | 12 | 1 |
| Juárez | Total | | 63 | 6 | 0 | 0 | — | | 0 | 0 | 6 | 0 | 59 | 6 |
| Career total | | | 228 | 21 | 8 | 1 | 1 | 0 | 1 | 0 | 6 | 0 | 244 | 22 |

=== International ===
As of match played 5 October 2026

Appearances and goals by national team and year
| National team | Year | Apps | Goals |
|---|---|---|---|
| Panama | 2018 | 10 | 0 |
| Panama | 2019 | 8 | 0 |
| Panama | 2021 | 14 | 2 |
| Panama | 2022 | 8 | 0 |
| Panama | 2023 | 4 | 2 |
| Panama | 2024 | 9 | 3 |
| Panama | 2025 | 13 | 1 |
| Panama | 2026 | 9 | 0 |
| Total | | 75 | 8 |

Scores and results list Panama's goal tally first.

List of international goals scored by José Luis Rodríguez
| No. | Date | Venue | Opponent | Score | Result | Competition |
|---|---|---|---|---|---|---|
| 1 | 21 July 2021 | Exploria Stadium, Orlando, Florida, United States | Grenada | 2–0 | 3–1 | 2021 CONCACAF Gold Cup |
| 2 | 21 July 2021 | Exploria Stadium, Orlando, Florida, United States | Grenada | 3–0 | 3–1 | 2021 CONCACAF Gold Cup |
| 3 | 13 October 2023 | Ergilio Hato Stadium, Willemstad, Curaçao | Curaçao | 2–0 | 2–1 | 2023–24 CONCACAF Nations League A |
| 4 | 20 November 2023 | Estadio Rommel Fernández, Panama City, Panama | Costa Rica | 2–0 | 3–1 | 2023–24 CONCACAF Nations League A |
| 5 | 6 June 2024 | Estadio Rommel Fernández, Panama City, Panama | Guyana | 2–0 | 2–0 | 2026 FIFA World Cup qualification |
| 6 | 9 June 2024 | Estadio Nacional, Managua, Nicaragua | Montserrat | 3–1 | 3–1 | 2026 FIFA World Cup qualification |
| 7 | 18 November 2024 | Estadio Rommel Fernández, Panama City, Panama | Costa Rica | 2–1 | 2–2 | 2024–25 Nations League QF |
| 8 | 18 November 2025 | Estadio Rommel Fernández, Panama City, Panama | El Salvador | 3–0 | 3–0 | 2026 FIFA World Cup qualification |

== Honours ==
Panama

- CONCACAF Nations League runner-up: 2024–25
