= Agustín Cardozo (footballer, born 1997) =

Argentine footballer

Personal information
- Full name: Agustín Ezequiel Cardozo
- Date of birth: 30 May 1997 (age 29)
- Place of birth: San Isidro, Buenos Aires, Argentina
- Height: 1.75 m (5 ft 9 in)
- Positions: Midfielder; winger

Team information
- Current team: Lanús
- Number: 30

Youth career
- Tigre

Senior career*
Years	Team	Apps	(Gls)
2016–2025	Tigre	123	(6)
2017	→ Santamarina (loan)	10	(0)
2018	→ Istra 1961 (loan)	13	(0)
2022	→ Gimnasia LP (loan)	39	(0)
2025–	Lanús	45	(0)
- * Club domestic league appearances and goals as of 17:21, 6 June 2026 (UTC)

Agustín Ezequiel Cardozo (born 30 May 1997) is an Argentine footballer who plays for Lanús.

== Honours ==
Tigre

- Copa de la Superliga: 2019
- Primera Nacional: 2021

Lanús

- Copa Sudamericana: 2025
- Recopa Sudamericana: 2026
