= Tomás Oneto =

Argentine footballer

Personal information
- Full name: Tomás Alexis Oneto
- Date of birth: 19 February 1998 (age 28)
- Place of birth: Pueblo Doyle, Argentina
- Height: 1.85 m (6 ft 1 in)
- Position: Centre-back

Team information
- Current team: Güemes

Youth career
- Talleres

Senior career*
Years	Team	Apps	(Gls)
2018–2019	Talleres	0	(0)
2018–2019	→ Istra 1961 (loan)	10	(0)
2019	→ Alavés B (loan)	5	(0)
2020	Aucas	3	(0)
2020–2023	All Boys	63	(2)
2023–2024	Universidad Católica	14	(1)
2024–2025	Chacarita Juniors	24	(0)
2025–2026	Olimpo	6	(0)
2026–	Güemes	5	(0)
- * Club domestic league appearances and goals as of 16:54, 29 April 2026 (UTC)

Tomás Alexis Oneto (born 19 February 1998) is an Argentine professional footballer who plays as a centre-back for Güemes.

== Career ==
Oneto began his senior career with Talleres, a team he spent his youth career with; featuring for the U20s at the 2018 U-20 Copa Libertadores in Uruguay, making three appearances. He left the club on loan in July 2018, joining Istra 1961 of the Croatian First Football League. Oneto's debut arrived on 12 August during a 3–0 defeat against Osijek. Eleven more matches followed. In January 2019, Oneto switched Croatia for Spain by agreeing a move to Tercera División side Alavés B. He won promotion with them to Segunda División B, though didn't feature much due to injuries. He returned to Talleres at the end of 2019.

January 2020 saw Oneto head out to Ecuadorian Serie A outfit Aucas. He'd appear just five times due to the COVID-19 pandemic, though did make his first appearances in the Copa Sudamericana versus Vélez Sarsfield in February. In the succeeding October, Oneto signed for All Boys of Primera B Nacional on a free transfer; penning a contract until December 2021. He was sent off twice in his first five appearances.

== Career statistics ==
As of 6 October 2023.

Club statistics
Club	Division	League			Cup		Continental		Total	
Club	Division	Season	Apps	Goals	Apps	Goals	Apps	Goals	Apps	Goals
Talleres	Primera División	2018-19	0	0	—		—		0	0
Talleres	Primera División	2019-20	0	0	—		—		0	0
Talleres	Total		0	0	—		—		0	0
Istra 1961	First League	2018-19	10	0	2	0	—		12	0
Alavés B	Tercera División	2018-19	3	0	—		—		3	0
Alavés B	Segunda División B	2019-20	2	0	—		—		2	0
Alavés B	Total		5	0	—		—		5	0
Aucas	Serie A	2020	3	0	—		2	0	5	0
All Boys	Primera B Nacional	2020	5	0	—		—		5	0
All Boys	Primera B Nacional	2021	30	0	—		—		30	0
All Boys	Primera B Nacional	2022	28	2	—		—		28	2
All Boys	Total		63	2	—		—		63	2
Universidad Católica	Serie A	2023	14	1	0	0	2	0	16	1
Career total			95	3	2	0	4	0	101	3
