= Jonathan Caicedo (footballer) =

Ecuadorian footballer (born 1996)

Personal information
- Full name: Jonathan Elias Caicedo Valencia
- Date of birth: 25 December 1996 (age 29)
- Place of birth: Esmeraldas, Ecuador
- Position: Winger

Youth career
- 2011–2016: Norte América

Senior career*
Years	Team	Apps	(Gls)
2016–2018	Norte América		
2018	9 de Octubre	5	(0)
2018–2019	Istra 1961	6	(0)
- * Club domestic league appearances and goals as of 4 April 2019

Jonathan Elias Caicedo Valencia (born 25 December 1996) is an Ecuadorian footballer who plays as a winger.

== Club career ==
Born in Esmeraldas on Christmas 1996, Caicedo joined the youth teams of the third-tier side from Guayaquil, Club Sport Norte América in April 2011. He remained at the club until early May 2018, when he moved to neighboring es:9 de Octubre Fútbol Club.

In late October 2018, Caicedo joined the top-tier Croatian side NK Istra 1961 on a three-year long contract, becoming the first Ecuadorian ever to feature in Croatian football. He made his league debut in the 1–0 away loss to Lokomotiva Zagreb, on November 3, 2018, having already debuted for the club in the Croatian Football Cup match against Inter Zaprešić on October 30, 2018.
