= Nicolas Senzemba =

French footballer (born 1996)

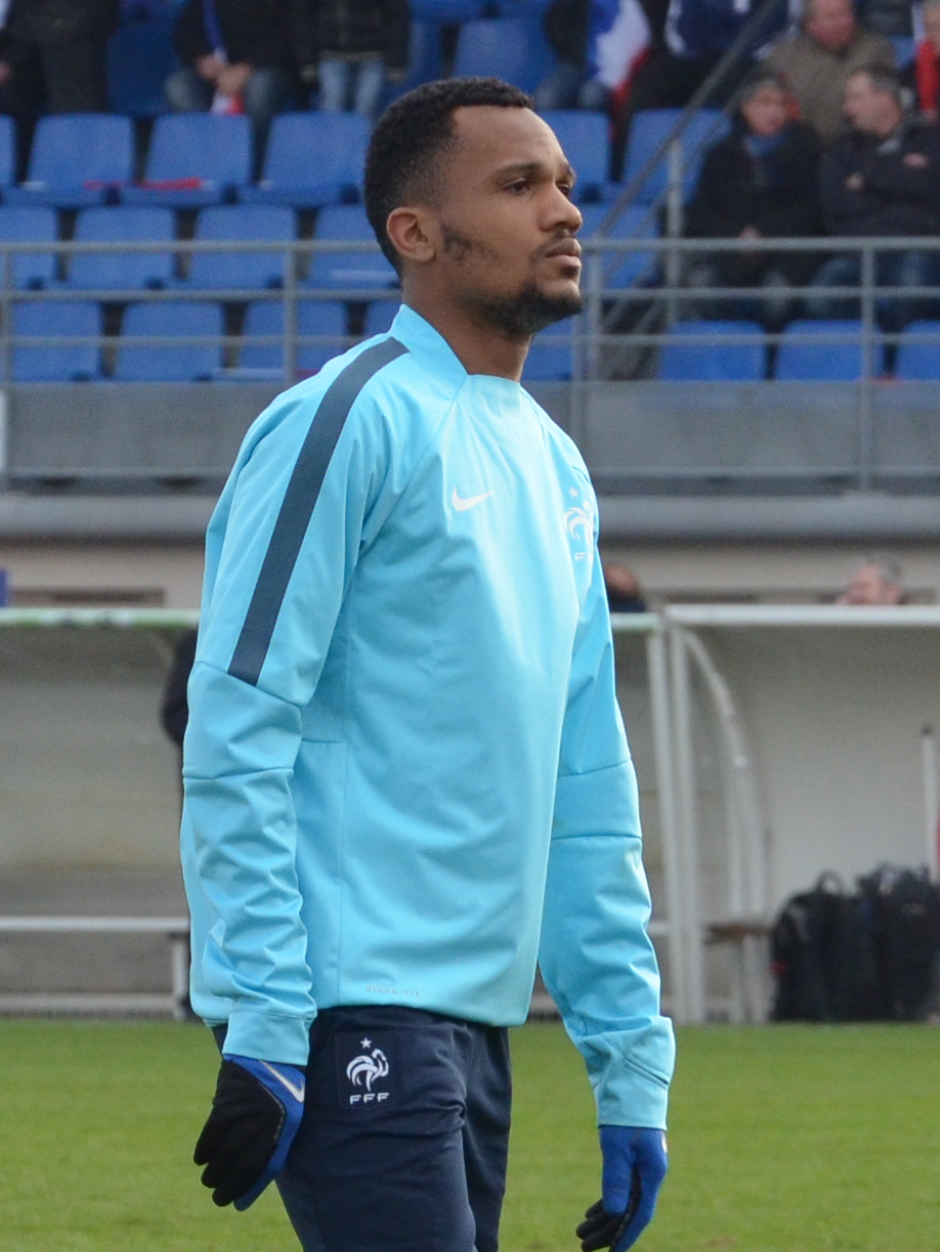
- Senzemba in 2015

Personal information
- Date of birth: 25 March 1996 (age 30)
- Place of birth: Champigny-sur-Marne, France
- Height: 1.78 m (5 ft 10 in)
- Position: Left-back

Team information
- Current team: Le Touquet

Youth career
- 2003–2005: VGA Saint-Maur
- 2005–2007: Champigny FC
- 2007–2011: Pau
- 2011–2014: Sochaux

Senior career*
Years	Team	Apps	(Gls)
2013–2020	Sochaux II	66	(2)
2014–2020	Sochaux	7	(0)
2016–2017	→ Pau (loan)	9	(0)
2018	→ Istra 1961 (loan)	3	(0)
2019	→ Concarneau (loan)	15	(0)
2020–2021	Sedan	6	(0)
2021–2022	Le Touquet	3	(0)
2022	Rumilly Vallières	12	(0)
2022–2023	GOAL	25	(0)
2024	US Gravelines		
2024–	Le Touquet		

International career^{‡}
2011–2012	France U16	13	(0)
2012–2013	France U17	13	(0)
2013–2014	France U18	0	(0)
2014–2015	France U19	11	(0)
- * Club domestic league appearances and goals as of 3 June 2023 ‡ National team caps and goals as of 17:52, 8 November 2018 (UTC)

Nicolas Senzemba (born 25 March 1996) is a French professional footballer who plays as a left-back for Le Touquet.

== Club career ==
Nicolas Senzemba is a youth exponent from FC Sochaux-Montbéliard. In 2015, he won the Coupe Gambardella with the club.

He made his league cup debut on 12 August 2014 against Stade Lavallois. and his Ligue 2 debut on 3 October 2014 against AJ Auxerre.

In the summer of 2018, Senzemba was sent on loan to Croatian side NK Istra 1961. After featuring in three matches in the Prva HNL the loan was terminated and he was loaned to Championnat National side US Concarneau at the beginning of October 2018. However, he had to wait until January 2019 for eligibility and made his debut for Concarneau on 18 January against Drancy.

In June 2020, after being released by Sochaux, Senzemba joined Championnat National 2 side CS Sedan Ardennes.

== International career ==
Senzemba has represented France internationally at U16, U17, and U19 levels.

== Honours ==
- Coupe Gambardella: 2015
