= Josip Čondrić =

Croatian footballer

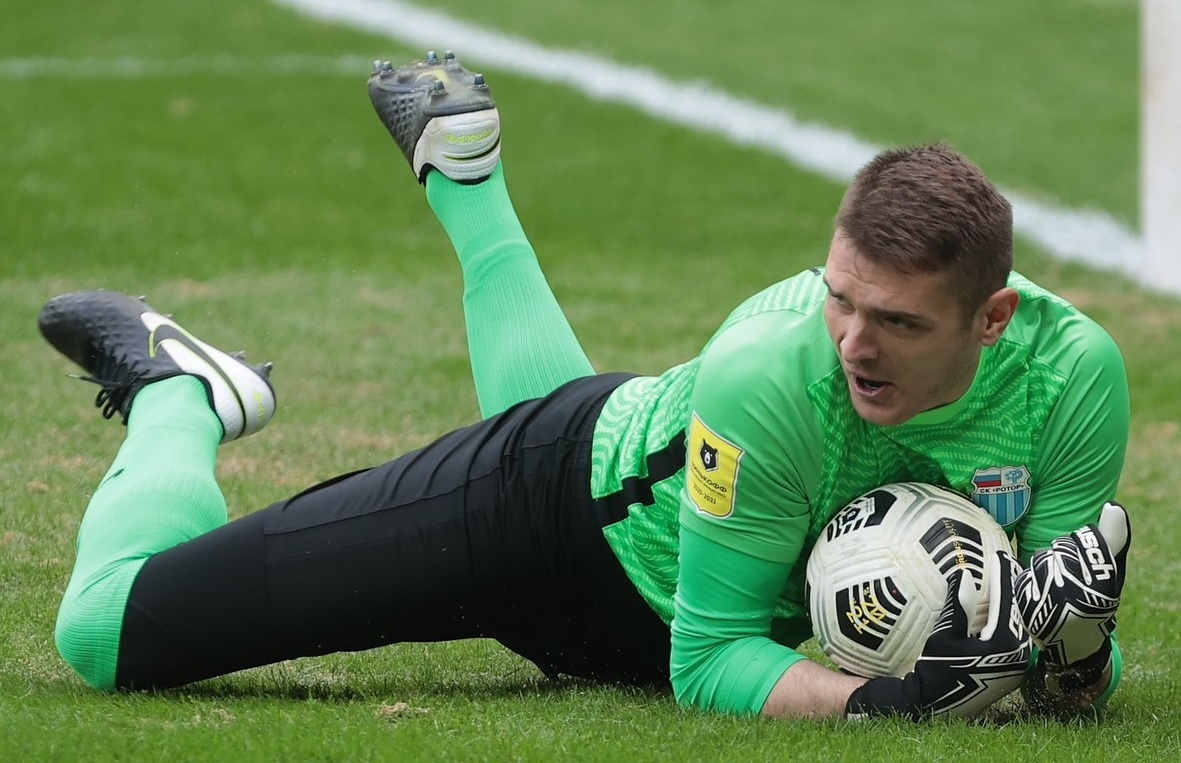
- Čondrić with Rotor Volgograd in 2021

Personal information
- Date of birth: 27 August 1993 (age 33)
- Place of birth: Zagreb, Croatia
- Height: 1.95 m (6 ft 5 in)
- Position: Goalkeeper

Team information
- Current team: Astana
- Number: 93

Youth career
- 2004–2005: Rudeš
- 2005–2006: Kustošija
- 2007–2008: Hrvatski Dragovoljac
- 2008–2010: Rudeš
- 2010–2011: Lokomotiva Zagreb
- 2012: HAŠK Zagreb

Senior career*
Years	Team	Apps	(Gls)
2012	HAŠK Zagreb	0	(0)
2013	Zagreb	0	(0)
2014	Trešnjevka	15	(0)
2014–2016	Zagreb	19	(0)
2014–2015	→ Bistra (loan)	22	(0)
2017–2018	Rudeš	24	(0)
2018–2020	Istra 1961	58	(0)
2020–2021	Rotor Volgograd	22	(0)
2021–2023	Zrinjski Mostar	30	(0)
2023–	Astana	57	(0)
- * Club domestic league appearances and goals as of 1 November 2026

Josip Čondrić (born 27 August 1993) is a Croatian professional footballer who plays as a goalkeeper for Kazakhstan Premier League club Astana.

== Club career ==
Čondrić, hailing from Zagreb's Rudeš neighborhood, started playing football at the local club NK Rudeš, but moved between several other Zagreb-area clubs during his youth years.

He started his career on the sidelines, as third-choice at HAŠK Zagreb and, since 2013, NK Zagreb, behind Dominik Livaković and Jakša Herceg. In 2014, he was released to fourth-tier NK Trešnjevka, but returned to NK Zagreb that summer, only to be loaned on to second-tier NK Bistra. In 2015, Čondrić returned yet again to NK Zagreb, again third-choice behind Livaković and Herceg, making his Prva HNL debut in the 2–3 home loss to HNK Hajduk Split, in the last game of the season., making some key saves.

Following NK Zagreb's relegation, Čondrić became the first-choice goalkeeper in the Druga HNL, but due to the club's problems he moved to his old club, NK Rudeš, in the same league, as back-up for Krunoslav Hendija. Rudeš achieved promotion, and, following Hendija's departure for NK Lokomotiva, Čondrić came ahead of Dominik Picak and took the first-team spot, which he kept until the end of the season, being hailed as the hero of the club's home 1–0 win against subsequent champions GNK Dinamo Zagreb in May 2018.

In the summer of 2018, Čondrić moved to NK Istra 1961., sharing time in the first 11 with Ioritz Landeta After having made 58 league appearances for Istra 1961, Čondrić left the club in August 2020.

On 28 August 2020, he signed with Russian Premier League club FC Rotor Volgograd.
