= Octavio Páez =

Venezuelan footballer (born 2000)

Personal information
- Full name: Octavio Andrés Páez Gil
- Date of birth: 28 February 2000 (age 26)
- Place of birth: Venezuela
- Position: Midfielder

Youth career
- Academia Emeritense
- Istra 1961

Senior career*
Years	Team	Apps	(Gls)
2019–2020	Istra 1961	7	(0)
2021	Leiknir Reykjavík		

International career
- Venezuela U17
- * Club domestic league appearances and goals

Octavio Andrés Páez Gil (born 28 February 2000) is a Venezuelan football who last played as a midfielder for Leiknir Reykjavík.

== Career ==
In 2018, Páez joined the youth academy of Croatian side Istra 1961. In 2021, he signed for Leiknir Reykjavík.
