= Agron Rufati =

Macedonian footballer

Personal information
- Date of birth: 6 April 1999 (age 27)
- Place of birth: Zagreb, Croatia
- Height: 1.83 m (6 ft 0 in)
- Position: Centre-back

Team information
- Current team: Dinamo
- Number: 2

Youth career
- 2008–2010: Tekstilac Ravnice Zagreb
- 2010–2013: HAŠK Zagreb
- 2014–2017: Dinamo Zagreb
- 2017–2018: Lokomotiva Zagreb

Senior career*
Years	Team	Apps	(Gls)
2018–2020	Istra 1961	23	(0)
2020–2022	Zorya Luhansk	14	(0)
2022–2023	Academica Clinceni	13	(0)
2023–2024	AP Brera	40	(2)
2024–	Dinamo City	11	(0)

International career^{‡}
2017	Macedonia U18	2	(0)
2017–2018	Macedonia U19	6	(0)
2018–2020	North Macedonia U21	14	(1)
- * Club domestic league appearances and goals as of 14 March 2024 ‡ National team caps and goals as of 31 July 2023

Agron Rufati (Macedonian: Агрон Руфати, born 6 April 1999) is a professional footballer who plays as a centre-back for Dinamo City . Born in Croatia, he has represented North Macedonia at youth level.

== Career ==
Born and raised in Zagreb, Croatia, Rufati started playing football at the local Tekstilac Ravnice Zagreb, before moving on to the more renowned HAŠK Zagreb. At the beginning of 2014, he joined the town's top academy, that of GNK Dinamo Zagreb where he would remain until the end of 2016. Following a successful season with NK Lokomotiva in the U19 youth league, Rufati joined NK Istra 1961 on 14 July 2018. Only 2 weeks after joining Istra he already made his professional debut in the opening round of the 2018–19 Croatian First Football League, having played 90 minutes in the 1–1 draw against Slaven Belupo on 29 July 2018.

== Honours ==
Zorya Luhansk

- Ukrainian Cup runner-up : 2020-21

Dinamo City

- Albanian Cup: 2024–25
