= Moha Traoré =

Malian footballer

Moha
Personal information
- Full name: Mohamed Traoré Diarra
- Date of birth: 29 November 1994 (age 31)
- Place of birth: Barcelona, Spain
- Height: 1.86 m (6 ft 1 in)
- Position: Forward

Team information
- Current team: SD Logroñés
- Number: 9

Youth career
- 2005–2006: La Florida
- 2006–2007: Espanyol
- 2007–2008: Hospitalet
- 2008–2012: Badalona
- 2012–2013: Espanyol

Senior career*
Years	Team	Apps	(Gls)
2011	Badalona	0	(0)
2012–2014	Espanyol B	17	(2)
2013–2014	→ Badalona (loan)	10	(0)
2014	→ Prat (loan)	14	(1)
2014–2015	Elche B	15	(1)
2015–2017	Córdoba B	69	(30)
2016–2017	Córdoba	4	(0)
2017–2018	Cádiz	11	(1)
2018–2019	Istra 1961	14	(0)
2019	→ Melilla (loan)	15	(2)
2019–2020	Hércules	23	(1)
2020–2021	Recreativo Huelva	6	(1)
2021–2022	Cornellà	23	(3)
2023	Cornellà	14	(0)
2023–2024	Intercity	32	(0)
2024	Badalona Futur	17	(4)
2025	Yeclano Deportivo	10	(0)
2025–	SD Logroñés	26	(0)
- * Club domestic league appearances and goals as of 7 May 2026

Mohamed Traoré Diarra (born 29 November 1994), commonly known as Moha, is a Spanish-Malian professional footballer who plays as a forward for Segunda Federación club SD Logroñés.

In a journeyman career, he played 15 games and scored once in the Segunda División for Córdoba and Cádiz, but spent most of his years in the lower leagues. He also had a brief spell in Croatia's top flight with Istra 1961.

== Club career ==
Born in Barcelona, Catalonia, Moha joined RCD Espanyol's youth setup in January 2012, after spells at CF Badalona and CE L'Hospitalet. He made his senior debut with the reserves during the campaign, winning promotion from Tercera División.

After being rarely used, Moha returned to Badalona in July 2013, on loan for one year. In January of the following year he was loaned to AE Prat, also of the Segunda División B.

On 12 July 2014, Moha signed for another reserve team, Elche CF Ilicitano also in the third tier. The following March, he was an unused substitute for the first team's La Liga game at RC Celta de Vigo because of Jonathas' injury, and in July 2015 he moved to Córdoba CF, being assigned to its B-team in the fourth division.

Moha made his professional debut on 13 March 2016, coming on as a half-time substitute for Luso in a 2–1 home loss against CD Lugo in the Segunda División. On 25 June 2017, after impressing with the reserves, he signed a three-year contract with Cádiz CF also in the second tier. Never a starter, he scored once in his season there, coming on late and confirming a 4–1 win over fellow Andalusians Sevilla Atlético at the Estadio Ramón de Carranza on 10 March 2018.

In August 2018, Moha left Spain for the first time in his career, signing for NK Istra 1961 of the Croatian First Football League. In 15 total games for the team from Pula he scored once, in a 4–2 cup first round win away to NK Sloga Nova Gradiška.

In January 2019 Moha returned to Spain's third tier on loan at UD Melilla. After helping the team from the North African exclave to the play-offs, he moved across the division to sign for Hércules CF in July.

Moha rescinded his contract with Hércules one year early in August 2020, and signed for Recreativo de Huelva. His participation at the club was delayed for a month, until he recovered from COVID-19. He played only six times, scoring once, as the club suffered a double relegation to the Tercera División RFEF due to a league restructuring. In June 2021, he returned to his native region and signed for UE Cornellà, two leagues above. Having been released a year later, he was brought back to the club in January 2023.

== International career ==
On 17 February 2014, Moha announced his intention to switch his allegiance to Mali.

On 20 March 2015, he was called up to the full squad for friendlies against Gabon and Ghana, but did not appear in either match.

== Personal life ==
Moha's younger brother, Adama, is also a footballer.
