= Arona Sané =

Senegalese footballer del Viveiro

Personal information
- Date of birth: 21 June 1995 (age 31)
- Place of birth: Sindia, Senegal
- Height: 1.73 m (5 ft 8 in)
- Position: Winger

Team information
- Current team: Sarriana
- Number: 19

Youth career
- Casa Sports
- ASC Jamoral
- 2009–2014: Atlético Madrid

Senior career*
Years	Team	Apps	(Gls)
2014–2015	Atlético Madrid C	33	(3)
2015–2018	Atlético Madrid B	102	(4)
2018	Atlético Madrid	1	(0)
2018–2021	Istra 1961	41	(0)
2021–2022	Langreo	8	(0)
2022	Alondras	13	(0)
2022–2023	Viveiro	29	(2)
2023–	Sarriana	83	(13)
- * Club domestic league appearances and goals as of 14 May 2026

Arona Sané (born 21 June 1995) is a Senegalese professional footballer who plays for Spanish club Sarriana as a right winger.

== Club career ==
Born in Sindia, Sané joined Atlético Madrid's youth setup in 2009 at the age of 14, from ASC Jamoral. He made his senior debut for the C-team in the 2013–14 campaign, in Tercera División.

Sané was promoted to the reserves ahead of the 2015–16 campaign, with the side now also in the fourth level. He helped the club in their promotion to Segunda División B in 2017, but suffered a knee injury during the final match of the play-offs.

Sané made his first team – and La Liga – debut on 6 May 2018, coming on as a first-half substitute for injured Vitolo in a 0–2 home loss against RCD Espanyol.
