= Francisco Tena (footballer, born 1993) =

Spanish footballer

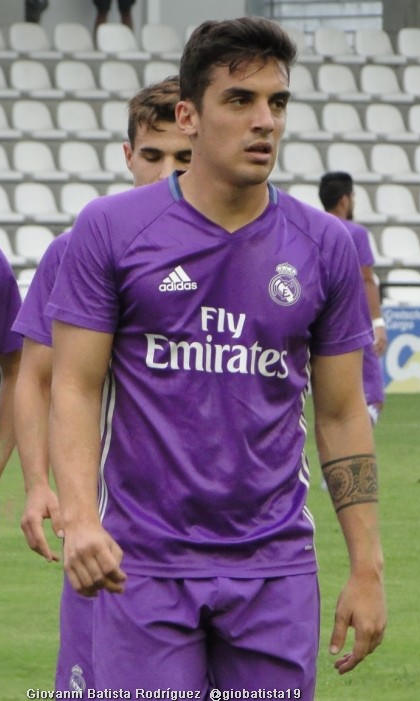

Personal information
- Full name: Francisco Manuel Tena Jaramillo
- Date of birth: 28 June 1993 (age 33)
- Place of birth: La Rinconada, Spain
- Height: 1.79 m (5 ft 10 1/2 in)
- Position: Midfielder

Youth career
- 2003–2007: Sevilla
- 2007–2011: AD Nervión
- 2011–2012: Betis

Senior career*
Years	Team	Apps	(Gls)
2012–2013	Ronda	29	(0)
2013–2014	Alcalá	31	(1)
2014–2016	Sevilla B	49	(1)
2016–2018	Real Madrid B	22	(0)
2018	Istra 1961	0	(0)
2019	Sanse	10	(0)
2019–2021	Ejea	47	(0)
2021–2022	El Ejido	29	(1)
2022–2024	Teruel	62	(0)
- * Club domestic league appearances and goals as of 25 May 2024

Francisco Manuel Tena Jaramillo (born 28 June 1993) is a Spanish footballer who plays as a midfielder.

== Club career ==
Born in La Rinconada, Seville, Andalusia, Tena graduated from Real Betis' youth system, but made his senior debuts for CD Ronda in the 2012–13 season, in Tercera División. In June 2013 he returned to Betis, but subsequently moved to Segunda División B's Córdoba CF B in the following month.

In August, however, Tena rescinded with the Verdiblancos and joined CD Alcalá in the fourth level. After being an ever-present figure during the campaign, he signed a one-year deal with Sevilla FC on 4 July 2014, being assigned to the reserves in the third division.

Tena played his first match as a professional on 3 December 2014, coming on as a substitute for Antonio Cotán in the 82nd minute of a 5–1 home routing of CE Sabadell FC for the Copa del Rey.

In September 2018, Tena joined the Prva HNL team NK Istra 1961, but left the club in December of the same year, not featuring in a single game.

On 29 January 2019, Tena then signed with UD Sanse.
