= Petar Bosančić =

Croatian footballer (born 1996)

Personal information
- Date of birth: 19 April 1996 (age 30)
- Place of birth: Split, Croatia
- Height: 1.90 m (6 ft 3 in)
- Position: Centre back

Team information
- Current team: FK Žalgiris
- Number: 37

Youth career
- 2006–2011: Solin
- 2012–2014: Hajduk Split

Senior career*
Years	Team	Apps	(Gls)
2014–2018	Hajduk Split	7	(0)
2014–2015	→ Hajduk Split II	34	(2)
2015–2016	→ Dugopolje (loan)	9	(1)
2016–2017	→ Sesvete (loan)	17	(1)
2018–2021	Istra 1961	73	(2)
2021	Mariupol	5	(0)
2022	Široki Brijeg	10	(0)
2022–2023	Cherno More	22	(0)
2023–2024	Riga FC	24	(1)
2024	FK Auda	11	(1)
2025–	Žalgiris	30	(1)

International career
2017–2018	Croatia U21	3	(1)
- * Club domestic league appearances and goals as of 17 September 2026

Petar Bosančić (Croatian pronunciation: [pětar bǒsaːtʃitɕ, pê-]; born 19 April 1996) is a Croatian professional footballer who plays as a centre back for Lithuanian club FK Žalgiris in TOPLYGA.

== Club career ==
Petar Bosančić started his career in the NK Solin youth academy, moving to the nearby giants Hajduk Split at the beginning of 2012. In the 2014–15 season, he established himself as a regular in Hajduk's third-tier B team, before making his debut for the injury and suspension-riddled first team on 26 April 2015 away 2–0 win against Slaven Belupo.

In March 2023, Bosančić signed for Latvian Higher League club Riga. He departed the club in July 2024 having had his contract terminated by mutual consent.

=== FK Žalgiris ===
In February 2025 Petar Bosančić signed with Lithuanian FK Žalgiris. On 3 March 2025 was injured at training and passed a part of the season. On 11 September 2025 announced, that footballer began training with Žalgiris team.

== International career ==
Though, as of April 2015, he hasn't played a single youth international match, Bosančić was placed on the extended, preliminary 35 candidate list for the Croatia U17 team for the 2013 FIFA U-17 World Cup, not making the final cut.
