= Kim Young-gyu (footballer) =

South Korean footballer

Kiu
Personal information
- Full name: Kim Young-Gyu
- Date of birth: 5 January 1995 (age 31)
- Place of birth: Yeongju, South Korea
- Height: 1.66 m (5 ft 5 in)
- Position: Winger

Team information
- Current team: Daejeon Korail
- Number: 7

Youth career
- 2010–2011: Real Madrid
- 2010–2011: → Palencia (loan)
- 2011–2013: Almería

Senior career*
Years	Team	Apps	(Gls)
2013–2017	Almería B	56	(0)
2013–2017	Almería	2	(0)
2015	→ Avilés (loan)	12	(1)
2016–2017	→ Melilla (loan)	24	(2)
2017–2018	Mérida	34	(3)
2018–2019	Istra 1961	2	(0)
2019	→ El Ejido (loan)	13	(0)
2020–2021	Siheung City	31	(4)
2022–	Daejeon Korail	0	(0)

International career
2014	South Korea U20	2	(0)
- * Club domestic league appearances and goals as of 6 November 2021

Kim Young-gyu (Korean: 김영규; born 5 January 1995), commonly known as Kiu, is a South Korean footballer who plays as a winger for Daejeon Korail FC.

== Football career ==
Kiu was born in Yeongju, and began his footballing career at local club Young In FBC. In 2010, aged 15, he signed for Real Madrid, but never appeared neither for its first team, nor for its youth setup. In January of the following year, he signed for second-tier club UD Almería, after impressing with CF Palencia.

Kiu was promoted to the reserves in the 2013 summer, and made his debut for the Andalusians' first team on 19 August, coming on as a late substitute for Fernando Soriano in a 2–3 La Liga home loss against Villarreal CF. On 30 January 2015, after appearing rarely, he was loaned to Real Avilés also in Segunda División B, until June.

On 26 July 2016, Kiu was loaned to fellow third-tier club UD Melilla, for one year. After that, he joined Mérida AD on a permanent basis.

Following Mérida's relegation, Kiu joined NK Istra 1961 of the Croatian First Football League in August 2018. Having made three substitute appearances of total five minutes duration, he came back to Spain's third tier in January when he was loaned to CD El Ejido, who ended the campaign with descent.
