= Obeng Regan =

Ghanaian footballer

Personal information
- Date of birth: 15 August 1994 (age 32)
- Place of birth: Kumasi, Ghana
- Height: 1.74 m (5 ft 8 1/2 in)
- Position: Midfielder

Team information
- Current team: Arsenal Tivat
- Number: 26

Youth career
- Feyenoord Ghana

Senior career*
Years	Team	Apps	(Gls)
2010–2011	Asante Kotoko	4	(0)
2012–2014	Napredak Kruševac	46	(2)
2014–2018	Čukarički	60	(4)
2017–2018	→ Inter Zaprešić (loan)	18	(0)
2018–2020	Istra 1961	51	(5)
2021	Mladost Lučani	9	(0)
2021–2022	Železničar Pančevo	42	(1)
2023	Novi Sad 1921	11	(0)
2023	Maziya S&RC		
2024–2025	Tekstilac Odžaci	10	(0)
2025–	Arsenal Tivat	4	(0)
- * Club domestic league appearances and goals as of 6 January 2025

Obeng Regan (born 15 August 1994) is a Ghanaian footballer who plays as a midfielder for Arsenal Tivat.

== Club career ==
=== Asante Kotoko ===
Born in Kumasi, he played in Ghana with Fetteh Feyenoord academy before being signed by Asante Kotoko SC in 2010. He debuted for Kotoko in the 2010–11 Ghana Premier League having made 4 appearances in the league that season under the coach Bogdan Korak.

=== Napredak Kruševac ===
Regan moved to Serbia where he spent one year attending high school in the city of Čačak and training with local teams Borac and Sloboda. Earlier he had also trained with clubs in England and the Netherlands. In summer 2012 he signed with FK Napredak Kruševac who brought him along another Ghanaian, Harif Mohammed, also former Asante Kotoko player. Initially he played with Napredak youth squad, but soon he made his league debut for the senior team by playing against OFK Mladenovac, on August 25, 2012. At the end of the 2012–13 Serbian First League season Napredak finished top, and thus won promotion to the 2013–14 Serbian SuperLiga. In May 2014, Regan went on a trial with Ajax, and Ajax's coach Frank de Boer reportedly wanted to sign him.

=== Čukarički ===
Regan signed a four-year contract with Čukarički on 17 August 2014.

=== Železničar Pančevo ===
On 18 August 2021, he joined Železničar Pančevo.

== Honours ==
Napredak Kruševac

- Serbian First League: 2012–13

Čukarički

- Serbian Cup: 2014–15
