= Julio Rodríguez (footballer, born 1995) =

Spanish footballer

Personal information
- Full name: Julio César Rodríguez López
- Date of birth: 7 December 1995 (age 30)
- Place of birth: Mieres, Spain
- Height: 1.94 m (6 ft 4 in)
- Position: Centre-back

Team information
- Current team: Avilés
- Number: 4

Youth career
- 2004–2005: Caudal
- 2005–2008: Oviedo
- 2008–2012: Sporting Gijón

Senior career*
Years	Team	Apps	(Gls)
2012–2016	Sporting B	76	(1)
2013–2017	Sporting Gijón	0	(0)
2016–2017	→ Barnsley (loan)	0	(0)
2017–2018	Recreativo	17	(0)
2018–2019	Istra 1961	22	(1)
2019	Voluntari	7	(0)
2020	Tsarsko Selo	13	(0)
2020–2021	Wisła Płock	1	(0)
2021–2023	Podbeskidzie	53	(3)
2023–	Avilés	41	(3)

International career
2013	Spain U18	1	(0)
2013	Spain U19	2	(0)
- * Club domestic league appearances and goals as of 15 June 2025

Julio César Rodríguez López (born 7 December 1995), known as Julio Rodríguez, is a Spanish professional footballer who plays as a centre-back for Avilés.

== Football career ==
Rodríguez was born in Mieres, Asturias. A product of Sporting de Gijón's prolific youth academy, he made his senior debuts in the 2012–13 season, playing 30 games in Segunda División B for the reserves.

Rodríguez first appeared officially with the main squad on 11 September 2013, starting in a 3–2 away loss against Recreativo de Huelva for the season's Copa del Rey. On 2 September 2014 he was definitely promoted to the main squad in Segunda División.

On 31 August 2016, Rodríguez was loaned to Championship club Barnsley for one season, initially assigned to the Development squad. Upon returning, he cut ties with the club on 26 July 2017.

In February 2020, Rodríguez joined Bulgarian club Tsarsko Selo Sofia.
