= Marin Grujević =

Croatian footballer

Personal information
- Full name: Marin Grujević
- Date of birth: 23 December 1991 (age 34)
- Place of birth: Rijeka, Croatia
- Height: 1.75 m (5 ft 9 in)
- Position: Right back

Team information
- Current team: Cibalia
- Number: 20

Youth career
- 2005: Draga
- 2005–2006: Rijeka
- 2006–2007: Opatija
- 2007–2010: Rijeka

Senior career*
| Years | Team | Apps | (Gls) |
| 2010–2013 | Rijeka | 2 | (0) |
| 2010–2011 | → Grobničan (loan) | 45 | (1) |
| 2012–2013 | → Pomorac (loan) | 25 | (0) |
| 2013–2014 | Pomorac | 28 | (0) |
| 2015–2017 | Novigrad | 72 | (6) |
| 2017–2018 | Istra 1961 | 20 | (1) |
| 2018 | Rudeš | 15 | (0) |
| 2018–2020 | Istra 1961 | 55 | (1) |
| 2021–2025 | Opatija | 92 | (3) |
| 2025– | Cibalia | 25 | (1) |
- * Club domestic league appearances and goals as of 15 June 2026

Marin Grujević (born 9 March 1994) is a Croatian professional footballer who plays as a right back for Cibalia.
