= Antonio Ivančić =

Croatian footballer

Personal information
- Full name: Antonio Ivančić
- Date of birth: 25 May 1995 (age 31)
- Place of birth: Zagreb, Croatia
- Height: 1.82 m (6 ft 0 in)
- Position: Midfielder

Team information
- Current team: Zrinjski Mostar
- Number: 20

Senior career*
Years	Team	Apps	(Gls)
2015–2018	Rudeš	65	(2)
2018–2022	Istra 1961	89	(9)
2023–	Zrinjski Mostar	99	(9)
- * Club domestic league appearances and goals as of 19 September 2026

Antonio Ivančić (born 25 May 1995) is a Croatian professional footballer who plays as a midfielder for Bosnian Premier League club Zrinjski Mostar.

== Career statistics ==
As of match played 19 September 2026

Appearances and goals by club, season and competition
Club	Season	League			National cup (Note: Includes Croatian Cup, Bosnian Cup)		Continental		Other		Total	
Club	Season	Division	Apps	Goals	Apps	Goals	Apps	Goals	Apps	Goals	Apps	Goals
Rudeš	2015–16	2. HNL	15	0	–		–		–		15	0
Rudeš	2016–17	2. HNL	27	1	1	0	–		–		28	1
Rudeš	2017–18	1. HNL	23	1	3	0	–		–		26	1
Rudeš	Total		65	2	4	0	–		–		69	2
Istra 1961	2018–19	1. HNL	17	2	2	2	–		2 (Note: Appearances in 2018–19 Croatian First Football League relegation play-offs)	1	21	5
Istra 1961	2019–20	1. HNL	30	2	1	1	–		1 (Note: Appearance in 2019–20 Croatian First Football League relegation play-offs)	0	32	3
Istra 1961	2020–21	1. HNL	27	5	4	0	–		–		31	5
Istra 1961	2021–22	1. HNL	15	0	0	0	–		–		15	0
Istra 1961	Total		89	9	7	3	–		3	1	99	13
Zrinjski Mostar	2022–23	Bosnian Premier League	12	1	6	1	–		–		18	2
Zrinjski Mostar	2023–24	Bosnian Premier League	27	3	6	0	14 (Note: Four appearances and one goal in UEFA Champions League; four appearances and one goal in UEFA Europa League; six appearances in UEFA Conference League)	2	–		47	5
Zrinjski Mostar	2024–25	Bosnian Premier League	28	4	4	0	5 (Note: Appearances in UEFA Conference League)	0	1 (Note: Appearance in Bosnian Supercup)	0	38	4
Zrinjski Mostar	2025–26	Bosnian Premier League	24	0	7	1	14 (Note: Four appearance in UEFA Champions League; three appearances in UEFA Europa League; seven appearances in UEFA Conference League)	0	1	0	46	1
Zrinjski Mostar	2026–27	Bosnian Premier League	8	1	0	0	2	0	–		10	1
Zrinjski Mostar	Total		99	9	23	2	35	2	2	0	159	13
Career total			253	20	34	5	35	2	5	1	327	28

== Honours ==
Rudeš

- Croatian Second League: 2016–17

Zrinjski Mostar

- Bosnian Premier League: 2022–23, 2024–25
- Bosnian Cup: 2022–23, 2023–24
- Bosnian Supercup: 2024
