= Markus Pavić =

Austrian footballer

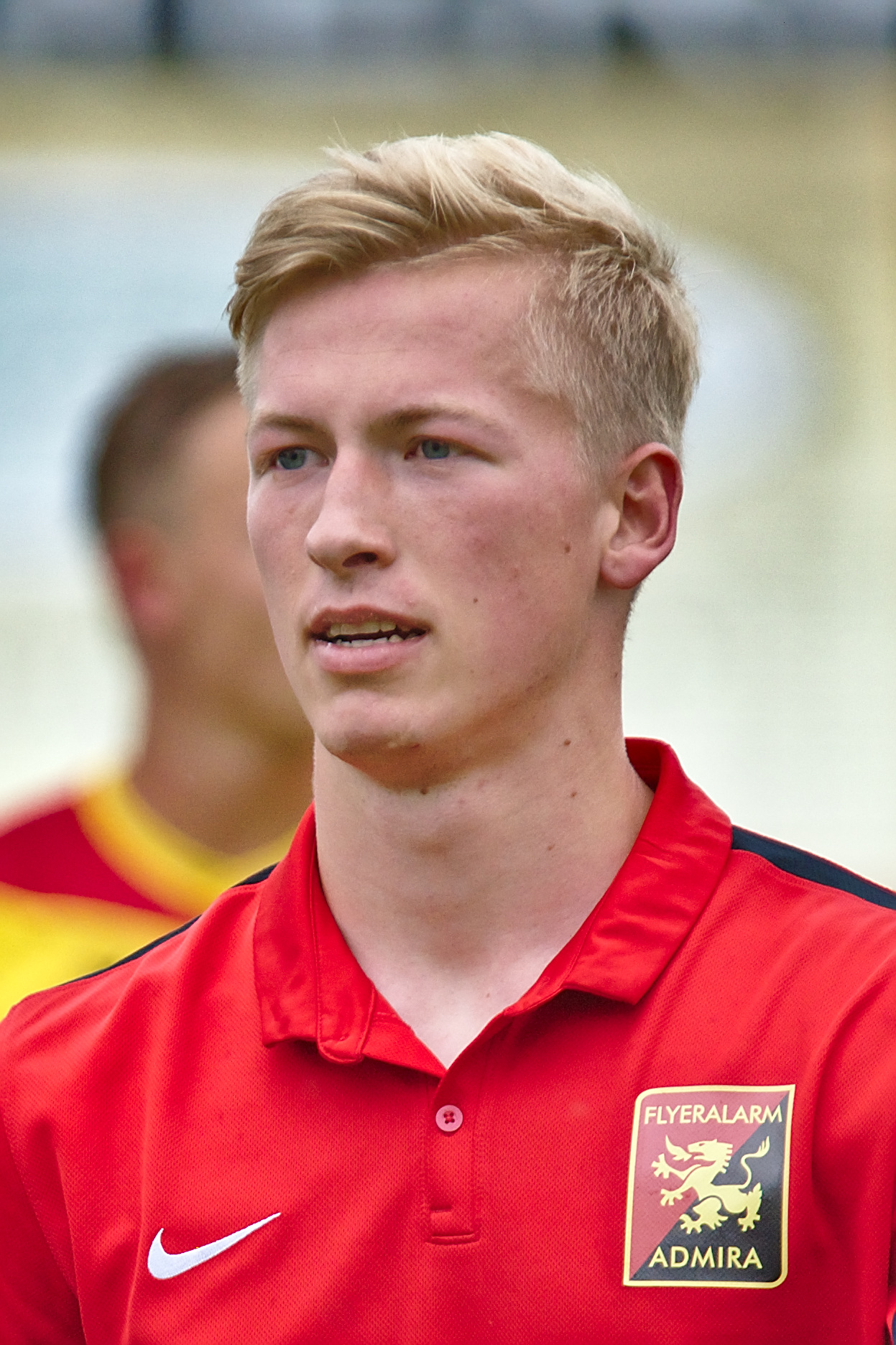

Personal information
- Date of birth: 26 March 1995 (age 31)
- Place of birth: Vienna, Austria
- Height: 1.84 m (6 ft 1/2 in)
- Position: Left back

Youth career
- 2003–2008: Austria Wien
- 2009–2012: FC Stadlau

Senior career*
| Years | Team | Apps | (Gls) |
| 2012–2014 | SV Wienerberg | 48 | (4) |
| 2014–2017 | Admira Wacker | 17 | (0) |
| 2014–2016 | → Admira Wacker II (loan) | 44 | (2) |
| 2017–2018 | Rudeš | 28 | (0) |
| 2018 | Sochaux | 0 | (0) |
| 2018 | → Sochaux II | 2 | (0) |
| 2019–2020 | Istra 1961 | 44 | (1) |
| 2020–2022 | Virtus Entella | 39 | (0) |
- * Club domestic league appearances and goals as of 23 April 2022

Markus Pavić (born 26 March 1995) is an Austrian footballer who plays as a left back.

== Career ==
On 4 September 2020, he joined Italian Serie B club Virtus Entella.

== Personal life ==
Born in Austria, Pavic is of Croatian descent.

== Career statistics ==
=== Club ===
As of match played 9 April 2022

Appearances and goals by club, season and competition
| Club | Season | League | | | National Cup | | Continental | | Other | | Total | |
| Club | Season | Division | Apps | Goals | Apps | Goals | Apps | Goals | Apps | Goals | Apps | Goals |
|---|---|---|---|---|---|---|---|---|---|---|---|---|
| Admira Wacker | 2015–16 | Austrian Bundesliga | 9 | 0 | 0 | 0 | — | | — | | 9 | 0 |
| Admira Wacker | 2016–17 | Austrian Bundesliga | 8 | 0 | 1 | 0 | 4 (Note: Appearance(s) in UEFA Europa League) | 0 | — | | 13 | 0 |
| Admira Wacker | Total | | 17 | 0 | 1 | 0 | 4 | 0 | 0 | 0 | 22 | 0 |
| Rudeš | 2017–18 | Prva HNL | 28 | 0 | 1 | 0 | — | | — | | 29 | 0 |
| Sochaux | 2018–19 | Ligue 2 | 0 | 0 | 2 | 0 | — | | — | | 2 | 0 |
| Istra 1961 | 2018–19 | Prva HNL | 15 | 1 | 0 | 0 | — | | 1 (Note: Appearance(s) in Relegation Playoffs) | 0 | 16 | 1 |
| Istra 1961 | 2019–20 | Prva HNL | 29 | 0 | 0 | 0 | — | | 1 | 0 | 30 | 0 |
| Istra 1961 | Total | | 44 | 1 | 0 | 0 | 0 | 0 | 2 | 0 | 46 | 1 |
| Virtus Entella | 2020–21 | Serie B | 21 | 0 | 2 | 0 | — | | — | | 23 | 0 |
| Virtus Entella | 2021–22 | Serie C | 18 | 0 | — | | — | | — | | 18 | 0 |
| Virtus Entella | Total | | 39 | 0 | 2 | 0 | 0 | 0 | 0 | 0 | 41 | 0 |
| Career total | | | 128 | 1 | 6 | 0 | 4 | 0 | 2 | 0 | 140 | 1 |
