= Maicon (footballer, born 1993) =

Brazilian footballer

Personal information
- Full name: Maicon da Silva Moreira
- Date of birth: 10 March 1993 (age 33)
- Place of birth: Cachoeira do Sul, Brazil
- Height: 1.84 m (6 ft 0 in)
- Positions: Right midfielder; right back

Youth career
- Cachoeira
- Juventude
- –2011: Grêmio
- 2011–2012: Reggina

Senior career*
Years	Team	Apps	(Gls)
2012–2014	Reggina	36	(2)
2013	→ Pontedera (loan)	2	(0)
2014–2019	Livorno	26	(2)
2016	→ Sport Recife (loan)	13	(0)
2017	→ Boavista (loan)	13	(2)
2019	NK Istra 1961	9	(0)
2020	FC Tulsa	1	(0)

International career^{‡}
2014	Brazil U23	1	(0)
- * Club domestic league appearances and goals as of 19 May 2019 ‡ National team caps and goals as of 12 November 2016

Maicon da Silva Moreira, simply known as Maicon (born 10 March 1993), is a Brazilian footballer who last played as a right midfielder or right defender for FC Tulsa in the USL Championship.

== Club career ==
Born in Cachoeira do Sul, Rio Grande do Sul. Maicon first played for clubs in the state.

In 2011, he moved to Italy and joined Reggina Calcio's youth setup. He made his professional debut on 6 May 2012, in a 1–3 loss at Sampdoria, and after a brief loan period with Pontedera, he established himself in the club's starting XI.

Maicon joined American USL Championship club FC Tulsa in January 2020. In August 2020 FC Tulsa announced they mutually terminated his contract after just 7 months with the club.
