= Ioritz Landeta =

Spanish footballer

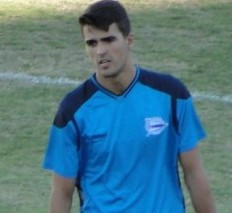

Personal information
- Full name: Ioritz Landeta Batiz
- Date of birth: 10 October 1995 (age 31)
- Place of birth: Munguía, Spain
- Height: 1.93 m (6 ft 4 in)
- Position: Goalkeeper

Youth career
- 2005–2007: Mungia
- 2008–2010: Danok Bat
- 2010–2011: Romo
- 2011–2014: Leioa

Senior career*
Years	Team	Apps	(Gls)
2014–2015	Gatika		
2015–2016	Zamudio		
2016–2019	Alavés B	64	(0)
2018–2019	→ Istra 1961 (loan)	5	(0)
2019–2020	Sestao	15	(0)
2020–2021	Portugalete	2	(0)
2021–2023	Arenas Getxo	53	(0)
- * Club domestic league appearances and goals as of 3 May 2021

Ioritz Landeta Batiz (born 10 October 1995) is a Spanish professional footballer who plays as a goalkeeper.

== Club career ==
Landeta played for a host of clubs during his youth, and in May 2015 he signed for Zamudio SD in Tercera División, from Gatika FT. In July 2016 he moved to Deportivo Alavés, being initially assigned to the reserves also in the fourth division.

In July 2018, Landeta was loaned to Alavés' affiliate club NK Istra 1961, for one season. He made his professional debut on 18 August, starting in a 1–2 Croatian First Football League home loss against NK Lokomotiva.

On 21 July 2019, Landeta signed for fourth division side Sestao River Club.

== Career statistics ==
As of match played 14 May 2023

Appearances and goals by club, season and competition
Club	Season	League			National Cup		Other		Total	
Club	Season	Division	Apps	Goals	Apps	Goals	Apps	Goals	Apps	Goals
Alavés	2017–18	La Liga	0	0	0	0	—		7	0
Istra 1961 (loan)	2018–19	1. HNL	5	0	1	0	0	0	6	0
Sestao	2019–20	Tercera División	15	0	1	0	2	0	18	0
Portugalete	2020–21	Segunda División B	2	0	2	0	—		4	0
Arenas Getxo	2021–22	Segunda División RFEF	20	0	—		1	0	21	0
Arenas Getxo	2022–23	Segunda Federación	33	0	2	0	—		35	0
Arenas Getxo	Total		53	0	2	0	1	0	56	0
Career total			75	0	6	0	3	0	84	0
