= 2017–18 HNK Hajduk Split season =

Hajduk Split
2017–18 season
- Chairman: Ivan Kos
- Manager: Joan Carrillo (until 6 November 2017); Željko Kopić (from 13 November 2017)
- Prva HNL: 3rd
- Croatian Cup: Runners-up
- Europa League: Play-off round
- Top goalscorer: League: Said Ahmed Said (11); All: Ante Erceg, Said Ahmed Said (13)
- Highest home attendance: 31,654 vs Everton (24 August 2017)
- Lowest home attendance: 6,085 vs Rudeš (3 March 2018)
Home colours	Away colours

The 2017–18 season was the 107th season in Hajduk Split's history and their twenty-seventh in the Prva HNL. Their 3rd-place finish in the 2016–17 season means it was their 27th successive season playing in the Prva HNL.

== First-team squad ==
For details of former players, see List of HNK Hajduk Split players.

As of 23 May 2018

Note: Flags indicate national team as defined under FIFA eligibility rules; some limited exceptions apply. Players may hold more than one non-FIFA nationality.

No.	Pos.	Nation	Player
1	GK	CRO	Dante Stipica
2	DF	BRA	Gustavo Carbonieri
3	DF	ESP	Borja López
4	DF	CRO	Petar Bosančić
5	MF	GAM	Hamza Barry
7	MF	HUN	Ádám Gyurcsó (on loan from Pogoń Szczecin)
9	FW	HUN	Márkó Futács
10	FW	POR	Hugo Almeida
13	GK	CRO	Ivo Grbić
14	MF	CRO	Josip Radošević
15	FW	CRO	Michele Šego
17	DF	CRO	Josip Juranović
18	MF	BIH	Zvonimir Kožulj
20	MF	CRO	Mijo Caktaš

No.	Pos.	Nation	Player
22	FW	ITA	Said Ahmed Said
23	DF	CRO	Zoran Nižić (captain)
24	DF	CRO	Mario Tičinović (on loan from Lokeren)
25	GK	CRO	Karlo Letica
26	MF	CRO	Toma Bašić
27	DF	ALB	Hysen Memolla
31	DF	GER	André Fomitschow
32	DF	CRO	Fran Tudor
33	MF	CRO	Stanko Jurić
34	DF	KOS	Ardian Ismajli
71	GK	CRO	Davor Matijaš
77	DF	ROU	Steliano Filip
90	MF	GRE	Savvas Gentsoglou
91	MF	CRO	Tonio Teklić

== Competitions ==
=== Overall record ===
As of match played 23 May 2018

Performance by competition
Competition	Starting round	Final position/round	First match	Last match
Prva HNL	—N/a	3rd	16 July 2017	19 May 2018
Croatian Football Cup	First round	Runners-up	20 September 2017	23 May 2018
UEFA Europa League	Second qualifying round	Play-off round	13 July 2017	24 August 2017

Statistics by competition
Competition	Pld	W	D	L	GF	GA	GD	Win%
Prva HNL	36	19	9	8	70	38	+32	52.78
Croatian Football Cup	5	3	1	1	8	3	+5	60.00
UEFA Europa League	6	3	2	1	6	4	+2	50.00
Total	47	25	12	10	86	45	+41	53.19

=== Prva HNL ===
==== Classification ====
Pos	Team	Pld	W	D	L	GF	GA	GD	Pts	Qualification or relegation
1	Dinamo Zagreb (C)	36	22	7	7	68	34	+34	73	Qualification for the Champions League second qualifying round
2	Rijeka	36	22	4	10	75	32	+43	70	Qualification for the Europa League third qualifying round (Note: Since the winners of the 2017–18 Croatian Football Cup, Dinamo Zagreb, qualified for European competition based on league position, the spot awarded to the cup winners (Europa League third qualifying round) was passed to the runners-up, the spot awarded to the runners-up was passed to the third-placed team, and the spot awarded to the third-placed team was passed to the fourth-placed team.)
3	Hajduk Split	36	19	9	8	70	38	+32	66	Qualification for the Europa League second qualifying round
4	Osijek	36	14	14	8	53	38	+15	56	Qualification for the Europa League first qualifying round
5	Lokomotiva	36	14	9	13	47	48	−1	51	

Source: PrvaHNL.hr
Rules for classification: 1) Points; 2) Head-to-head points; 3) Head-to-head goal difference; 4) Head-to-head goals scored (at home if two teams tied); 5) Goal difference; 6) Goals scored; 7) Play-off
(Note: Criteria 2–4 and 7 is only used if deciding champion, teams to international competition or teams for relegation and in that case criteria 6 will not be used).
(C) Champions

==== Results summary ====
Overall								Home						Away					
Pld	W	D	L	GF	GA	GD	Pts	W	D	L	GF	GA	GD	W	D	L	GF	GA	GD
36	19	9	8	70	38	+32	66	9	5	4	31	18	+13	10	4	4	39	20	+19

Last updated: 19 May 2018.
Source: Competitive matches

==== Results by round ====
Round	1	2	3	4	5	6	7	8	9	10	11	12	13	14	15	16	17	18	19	20	21	22	23	24	25	26	27	28	29	30	31	32	33	34	35	36
Ground	A	A	A	A	H	A	H	A	H	H	H	H	H	A	H	A	H	A	A	H	A	A	H	H	H	A	H	H	A	H	H	A	A	A	H	A
Result	W	D	W	L	W	W	W	L	L	D	W	W	D	D	L	W	D	W	W	W	W	W	L	W	W	D	D	W	W	W	L	D	L	W	D	L
Position	1	3	3	3	2	2	2	3	3	3	2	2	2	2	2	2	3	2	3	2	2	2	2	2	2	2	2	2	2	2	2	3	3	3	3	3

Source: Competitive matches
A = Away; H = Home; W = Win; D = Draw; L = Loss

==== Results by opponent ====
Team	Results				Points
Team	1	2	3	4	Points
Cibalia	2–1	2–1	5–0	4–0	12
Dinamo Zagreb	1–3	2–2	1–0	1–2	4
Inter Zaprešić	2–2	2–0	5–0	3–0	10
Istra 1961	2–0	3–1	3–2	5–1	12
Lokomotiva	3–1	2–2	2–0	1–0	10
Osijek	1–2	1–1	3–3	1–1	3
Rijeka	0–2	2–1	1–1	1–3	4
Rudeš	4–0	2–3	1–0	1–2	6
Slaven Belupo	1–0	0–0	0–1	0–0	5

Source: 2017–18 Croatian First Football League article

== Matches ==
=== Friendlies ===
==== Pre-season ====
Match	Date	Venue	Opponent	Score	Hajduk Scorers	Report
1	29 Jun	A (Slovenia)	(Slovenia) Rudar Velenje	2 – 2	(Croatia) Erceg (2)	hajduk.hr
2	3 Jul	N (Slovenia)	(Ukraine) Zorya Luhansk	0 – 1	—	hajduk.hr
3	7 Jul	A (Slovenia)	(Slovenia) Krško	2 – 0	(Croatia) Erceg, (Croatia) Vlašić	hajduk.hr

==== On-season ====
Match	Date	Venue	Opponent	Score	Hajduk Scorers	Report
1	6 Oct	A (Bosnia and Herzegovina)	(Bosnia and Herzegovina) Vitez	3 – 0	(Bosnia and Herzegovina) Kožulj, (Croatia) Prtajin, (The Gambia) Barry	hajduk.hr
2	9 Nov	A	(Croatia) Jadran Tučepi	5 – 0	(Croatia) Jandrek, (Croatia) Pasariček, (Croatia) Kovačević (2), (Albania) Deliu	hajduk.hr
3	24 Mar	A (Poland)	(Poland) Górnik Zabrze	2 – 3	(Hungary) Gyurcsó, (Croatia) Kovačević	hajduk.hr

==== Mid-season ====
Match	Date	Venue	Opponent	Score	Hajduk Scorers	Report
1	14 Jan	H	(Croatia) Varteks	5 – 0	(Kosovo) Ismajli, (Italy) Said, (Portugal) Almeida, (Croatia) Kovačević (2)	hajduk.hr
2	20 Jan	N (Turkey)	(Switzerland) FC Zürich	4 – 1	(Italy) Said, (Spain) Borja, (Portugal) Almeida (2)	hajduk.hr
3	26 Jan	N (Turkey)	(Poland) Lech Poznań	1 – 0	(Croatia) Nižić	hajduk.hr
4	27 Jan	N (Turkey)	(Slovakia) AS Trenčín	4 – 2	(Hungary) Gyurcsó (2), (The Gambia) Hamza, (Italy) Said	hajduk.hr
5	2 Feb	A (Bosnia and Herzegovina)	(Bosnia and Herzegovina) GOŠK Gabela	1 – 2	(Hungary) Gyurcsó	hajduk.hr
6	3 Feb	N (Bosnia and Herzegovina)	(Bosnia and Herzegovina) Zrinjski	2 – 1	(Cameroon) Ohandza (2)	hajduk.hr

=== Prva HNL ===
16 July 2017 1	Lokomotiva	1–3	Hajduk Split	Zagreb
19:00 CEST (UTC+02:00)	Karačić 47'; Doležal (yellow card) 52'; Datković (yellow card) 56'; Majer (yellow card) 70'; Kolar (yellow card) 76'	Report	Ohandza (yellow card) 27'; Barry (yellow card) 42'; Ohandza 45'; Erceg 54'; Nižić (yellow card) 76' (goal) 87'	Stadium: Stadion Maksimir; Attendance: 2,293; Referee: Ivan Bebek (Rijeka)

23 July 2017 2	Inter Zaprešić	2–2	Hajduk Split	Zaprešić
19:00 CEST (UTC+02:00)	Mazalović (yellow card) 31'; Blažević (yellow card) 38'; Šarić 61'; Puljić 64'	Report	Gentsoglou 14'; Vlašić 21'; Kožulj (yellow card) 78'	Stadium: Stadion ŠRC Zaprešić; Attendance: 2,169; Referee: Mario Zebec (Cestica)

30 July 2017 3	Cibalia	1–2	Hajduk Split	Vinkovci
18:00 CEST (UTC+02:00)	Karamarko (yellow card) 53'; Muženjak (yellow card) 66'; Čuljak (yellow card) 75'; Vitaić 83'	Report	Barry (yellow card) 12'; Kožulj (yellow card) 45'; Said 57'; Vlašić 76'	Stadium: Stadion HNK Cibalia; Attendance: 2,291; Referee: Igor Pajač (Sveti Ivan Zelina)

6 August 2017 4	Dinamo Zagreb	3–1	Hajduk Split	Zagreb
19:00 CEST (UTC+02:00)	Ćorić 8'; Olmo 78'; Soudani 80'; Sigali (yellow card) 90+3'	Report	Juranović (yellow card) 6'; Nižić 64'; Šehić (yellow card) 83'	Stadium: Stadion Maksimir; Attendance: 11,936; Referee: Mario Zebec (Cestica)

11 August 2017 5	Hajduk Split	1–0	Slaven Belupo	Split
21:00 CEST (UTC+02:00)	Ohandza 62'	Report	Bouadla (yellow card) 41'; Međimorec (yellow card) 69' (yellow-red card) 90+3'	Stadium: Stadion Poljud; Attendance: 10,177; Referee: Dalibor Mlakar (Zagreb)

20 August 2017 6	Rudeš	0–4	Hajduk Split	Zagreb
19:00 CEST (UTC+02:00)	Vuco (yellow card) 15' (yellow-red card) 24'; Borevković (yellow card) 19' (yellow-red card) 30'; Mesarić (yellow card) 22'; Cristian (yellow card) 34'	Report	Said 12' (45+2), 59'; Barry 39'; Pešić (yellow card) 42'; Barry (yellow card) 45'; Carbonieri (yellow card) 47'	Stadium: Stadion Kranjčevićeva; Attendance: 2,102; Referee: Damir Batinić (Osijek)

27 August 2017 7	Hajduk Split	2–0	Istra 1961	Split
21:00 CEST (UTC+02:00)	Erceg 6'; Gentsoglou (yellow card) 18'; Vlašić 31' (pen.); Pešić (yellow card) 82'	Report	Čuljak (yellow card) 31'; Puclin (yellow card) 51'; Hadžić (yellow card) 66'; Maksimović (yellow card) 68'; Prelčec (yellow card) 80'	Stadium: Stadion Poljud; Attendance: 8,956; Referee: Fran Jović (Zagreb)

9 September 2017 8	Osijek	2–1	Hajduk Split	Osijek
19:00 CEST (UTC+02:00)	Hajradinović 51'; Robert Mudražija (yellow card) 59'; Grezda (yellow card) 63' (goal) 90+3'; Lukić (yellow card) 86'	Report	Barry (yellow card) 31'; Nižić 50'; Juranović (yellow card) 50'; López (yellow card) 55'	Stadium: Stadion Gradski vrt Attendance: 8,054; Referee: Dalibor Mlakar (Zagreb)

17 September 2017 9	Hajduk Split	0–2	Rijeka	Split
17:00 CEST (UTC+02:00)	Said (yellow card) 86'	Report	Župarić (yellow card) 16'; Héber 24' 58'; Elez (yellow card) 88'	Stadium: Stadion Poljud; Attendance: 18,108; Referee: Igor Pajač (Sveti Ivan Zelina)

24 September 2017 10	Hajduk Split	2–2	Lokomotiva	Split
19:00 CEST (UTC+02:00)	Erceg (yellow card) 57'; Almeida 73', 89'; Said (yellow card) 90+3'	Report	Šunjić (yellow card) 43'; Krstanović 66'; Musa (yellow card) 70'; Capan 90+3' (yellow card) 90+3'; Radonjić (yellow card) 90+3'; Ivanušec (yellow card) 90+3'	Stadium: Stadion Poljud; Attendance: 8,088; Referee: Damir Batinić (Osijek)

30 September 2017 11	Hajduk Split	2–0	Inter Zaprešić	Split
19:00 CEST (UTC+02:00)	Radošević 9'; Erceg 59'; Nižić (yellow card) 73' (yellow-red card) 89'	Report	Mazalović (yellow card) 33'	Stadium: Stadion Poljud; Attendance: 7,059; Referee: Fran Jović (Zagreb)

15 October 2017 12	Hajduk Split	2–1	Cibalia	Split
19:00 CEST (UTC+02:00)	Bašić 6'; Radošević 57'	Report	Plum 13'; Galić (yellow card) 68'	Stadium: Stadion Poljud; Attendance: 8,015; Referee: Dalibor Mlakar (Zagreb)

21 October 2017 13	Hajduk Split	2–2	Dinamo Zagreb	Split
19:00 CEST (UTC+02:00)	Erceg 38', 90+4' (pen.) (yellow card) 60'; Almeida (yellow card) 88'; Šehić (yellow card) 90+2'; Kožulj (yellow card) 90+6'	Report	Doumbia (yellow card) 88'; Benković 89'; Henríquez 90+1'; Stojanović (yellow card) 90+4'; Sosa (yellow card) 90+6'	Stadium: Stadion Poljud; Attendance: 24,736; Referee: Tihomir Pejin (Donji Miholjac)

29 October 2017 14	Slaven Belupo	0–0	Hajduk Split	Koprivnica
15:00 CEST (UTC+02:00)	Goda (yellow card) 90'	Report		Stadium: Gradski stadion Attendance: 2,207; Referee: Ivan Bebek (Rijeka)

4 November 2017 15	Hajduk Split	2–3	Rudeš	Split
19:00 CET (UTC+01:00)	López 15'; Ohandza 21'; Tudor (yellow card) 63'	Report	Borevković (yellow card) 29'; Entrena 61', 89' (yellow card) 89'; Budimir 69'	Stadium: Stadion Poljud; Attendance: 6,355; Referee: Damir Batinić (Osijek)

19 November 2017 16	Istra 1961	1–3	Hajduk Split	Pula
18:00 CET (UTC+01:00)	Čuljak (yellow card) 13'; Kitanovski (yellow card) 43' (goal) 66'; Bertoša (yellow card) 45+1'; Halilović (yellow card) 51'; Ofosu (penalty missed) 90+2' (yellow card) 90+2'	Report	López 8' (yellow card) 35'; Erceg 42'; Said 43'; Memolla (yellow card) 58'; Pešić (yellow card) 88'	Stadium: Stadion Aldo Drosina; Attendance: 3,119; Referee: Igor Pajač (Sveti Ivan Zelina)

25 November 2017 17	Hajduk Split	1–1	Osijek	Split
18:00 CET (UTC+01:00)	Ismajili (yellow card) 58'; Said (yellow card) 63' (goal) 90+2'; López (yellow card) 68'	Report	Grgić 39'; Bočkaj (yellow card) 69'; Boban (yellow card) 85'	Stadium: Stadion Poljud; Attendance: 10,076; Referee: Fran Jović (Zagreb)

2 December 2017 18	Rijeka	1–2	Hajduk Split	Rijeka
18:00 CET (UTC+01:00)	Bradarić 11'; Pavičić (yellow card) 37'; Zuta (yellow card) 65'; Gavranović (penalty missed) 68'; Gorgon (yellow card) 74'	Report	Bašić 3' (yellow card) 8'; Erceg (yellow card) 43' (goal) 51'; Gentsoglou (yellow card) 68'; Barry (yellow card) 70'; Ismajli (yellow card) 71'; Letica (yellow card) 90+4'	Stadium: Stadion Rujevica; Attendance: 6,349; Referee: Igor Pajač (Sveti Ivan Zelina)

10 December 2017 19	Lokomotiva	0–2	Hajduk Split	Zagreb
15:00 CET (UTC+01:00)	Doležal (yellow card) 27' (yellow-red card) 51'; Barić (yellow card) 67'; Majer (yellow card) 77' (yellow-red card) 81'	Report	Letica (yellow card) 27'; Gentsoglou (yellow card) 61'; Tudor (yellow card) 63'; Ohandza 66', 90+4'; Said (yellow card) 79'	Stadium: Stadion Maksimir; Attendance: 1,290; Referee: Mario Zebec (Cestica)

17 December 2017 20	Hajduk Split	5–0	Inter Zaprešić	Split
15:00 CET (UTC+01:00)	Said (yellow card) 23' (goal) 56'; Ohandza 49'; Erceg 67', 75'; Almeida 77'	Report	Andrić (yellow card) 41'; Regan (yellow card) 45'; Komorski (yellow card) 53'	Stadium: Stadion Poljud; Attendance: 7,417; Referee: Ivan Vučković (Zagreb)

11 February 2018 21	Cibalia	0–5	Hajduk Split	Vinkovci
15:00 CET (UTC+01:00)	Plum (yellow card) 30'; Rubić (yellow card) 61'	Report	Said 39'; Caktaš (yellow card) 60' (goal) 61'; Fomitschow 69'; Ohandza 76', 80'	Stadium: Stadion HNK Cibalia; Attendance: 3,196; Referee: Mario Zebec (Cestica)

18 February 2018 22	Dinamo Zagreb	0–1	Hajduk Split	Zagreb
15:00 CET (UTC+01:00)	Lešković (yellow card) 40'; Gavranović (penalty missed) 80'; Doumbia (yellow card) 84'	Report	López (yellow card) 53' (yellow-red card) 79'; Ohandza 53'; Nižić (yellow card) 62'; Filip (yellow card) 90+4'	Stadium: Stadion Maksimir; Attendance: 13,500; Referee: Tihomir Pejin (Donji Miholjac)

24 February 2018 23	Hajduk Split	0–1	Slaven Belupo	Split
17:00 CET (UTC+01:00)	Ismajli (yellow card) 5'; Ohandza (red card) 73'; Tičinović (yellow card) 83'	Report	Vidović (yellow card) 29'; Ivanovski (yellow card) 35'; Delić 73'	Stadium: Stadion Poljud; Attendance: 12,360; Referee: Ivan Vučković (Zagreb)

3 March 2018 24	Hajduk Split	1–0	Rudeš	Split
15:00 CET (UTC+01:00)	Radošević (yellow card) 5'; Gyurcsó 52'; Šego (yellow card) 83'	Report	Fazli (yellow card) 8'; Borevković (yellow card) 28'	Stadium: Stadion Poljud; Attendance: 6,085; Referee: Ivan Bebek (Rijeka)

10 March 2018 25	Hajduk Split	3–2	Istra 1961	Split
17:00 CET (UTC+01:00)	Gyurcsó 16'; Said 71'; Letica 90+6'	Report	Vojnović 27' (yellow card) 39'; Matei 53'; Iveša (yellow card) 89'; Čuljak (yellow card) 90+2' (yellow-red card) 90+4'; Halilović (yellow card) 90+5'	Stadium: Stadion Poljud; Attendance: 7,780; Referee: Dalibor Mlakar (Zagreb)

18 March 2018 26	Osijek	3–3	Hajduk Split	Osijek
17:00 CET (UTC+01:00)	Grezda (yellow card) 17'; Marić 22'; Lopa 31' (yellow card) 75'; Šimunec (yellow card) 39'; Škorić (yellow card) 68'; Hajradinović 77' (pen.); Ejupi (yellow card) 86'	Report	Bašić 2'; Barry (yellow card) 11'; López (yellow card) 37'; Gentsoglou 41' (yellow card) 64'; Radošević (yellow card) 55'; Šimunec 57' (o.g.); Fomitschow (yellow card) 73' (yellow-red card) 87'; Caktaš (yellow card) 77'	Stadium: Stadion Gradski vrt Attendance: 3,850; Referee: Fran Jović (Zagreb)

31 March 2018 27	Hajduk Split	1–1	Rijeka	Split
17:00 CEST (UTC+02:00)	Ismajli (yellow card) 8'; Said (yellow card) 45+1'; Caktaš 62' (pen.); Nižić (yellow card) 88'; Kovačević (yellow card) 90+2'	Report	Raspopović (yellow card) 14'; Čolak (yellow card) 30' (yellow-red card) 90+4' (goal) 52'; Župarić (yellow card) 45'; Punčec (yellow card) 90+1'	Stadium: Stadion Poljud; Attendance: 15,690; Referee: Igor Pajač (Sveti Ivan Zelina)

7 April 2018 28	Hajduk Split	1–0	Lokomotiva	Split
19:00 CEST (UTC+02:00)	Caktaš 30'; Ismajli (yellow card) 64'; Fomitschow (yellow card) 75'	Report	Majer (yellow card) 53'; Babić (yellow card) 77'; Majstorović (yellow card) 82'	Stadium: Stadion Poljud; Attendance: 8,656; Referee: Damir Batinić (Osijek)

14 April 2018 29	Inter Zaprešić	0–3	Hajduk Split	Zaprešić
19:00 CEST (UTC+02:00)	Postonjski (yellow card) 59'; Grgić (red card) 90+1'	Report	Barry (yellow card) 20'; Gyurcsó 59'; Caktaš (yellow card) 64' (goal) 68' (pen.), 79'	Stadium: Stadion ŠRC Zaprešić; Attendance: 1,665; Referee: Fran Jović (Zagreb)

18 April 2018 30	Hajduk Split	4–0	Cibalia	Split
20:00 CEST (UTC+02:00)	Gyurcsó 19', 90+2'; Futács 44'; Radošević 58'	Report		Stadium: Stadion Poljud; Attendance: 14,169; Referee: Ivan Vučković (Zagreb)

22 April 2018 31	Hajduk Split	1–2	Dinamo Zagreb	Split
17:00 CEST (UTC+02:00)	López (yellow card) 12'; Caktaš 25'; Radošević (yellow card) 47'	Report	Gavranović 14', 59'; Doumbia (yellow card) 24'; Ademi (yellow card) 31'; Rrahmani (yellow card) 44'; Fiolić (yellow card) 76'	Stadium: Stadion Poljud; Attendance: 31,751; Referee: Mario Zebec (Cestica)

29 April 2018 32	Slaven Belupo	0–0	Hajduk Split	Koprivnica
19:00 CEST (UTC+02:00)	Arap (yellow card) 53'; Ivanovski (yellow card) 71'; Goda (yellow card) 83'	Report	Gentsoglou (yellow card) 12'; Futács (yellow card) 46'; Nižić (yellow card) 56'	Stadium: Gradski Stadion Ivan Kušek Apaš; Attendance: 2,403; Referee: Dalibor Mlakar (Zagreb)

6 May 2018 33	Rudeš	2–1	Hajduk Split	Zagreb
17:00 CEST (UTC+02:00)	Anderson 14' (yellow card) 78'; M. Pavić (yellow card) 28'; Mesarić (yellow card) 32'; Galilea (yellow card) 44' (goal) 83'; Picak (yellow card) 89'; Ivančić (yellow card) 90+2'	Report	Barry (yellow card) 8' (goal) 78'; Futács (yellow card) 57'; Fomitschow (yellow card) 83'; López (yellow card) 90+2'	Stadium: Stadion Kranjčevićeva; Attendance: 1,236; Referee: Marin Vidulin (Kanfanar)

9 May 2018 34	Istra 1961	1–5	Hajduk Split	Pula
18:00 CEST (UTC+02:00)	Roce 27'; Matas (yellow card) 45'; A. Pavić (yellow card) 65'; Vojnović (yellow card) 86'	Report	Gyurcsó 5' (yellow card) 45'; Tudor 13'; Said 36' (yellow card) 45'; Bašić (yellow card) 61'; Futács 86'; Šego 89'	Stadium: Aldo Drosina; Attendance: 2,272; Referee: Damir Batinić (Osijek)

13 May 2018 35	Hajduk Split	1–1	Osijek	Split
19:00 CEST (UTC+02:00)	Tudor 41'; Bašić (yellow card) 43'; Fomitschow (yellow card) 88'; López (yellow card) 90+3'	Report	Barać (yellow card) 11' (yellow-red card) 90+3'; Marić 59'; Barišić (yellow card) 79'; Škorić (yellow card) 81'; Šimunec (yellow card) 90+3'; Grgić (yellow card) 90+3'	Stadium: Stadion Poljud; Attendance: 10,495; Referee: Igor Pajač (Sveti Ivan Zelina)

19 May 2018 36	Rijeka	3–1	Hajduk Split	Rijeka
17:00 CEST (UTC+02:00)	Čolak 2' (yellow card) 46'; Pavičić 36'; Gorgon (yellow card) 65'; Leovac (yellow card) 77'; Puljić 90+5'	Report	López (yellow card) 6' (yellow-red card) 62'; Said 50' (yellow card) 81'; Ismajli (yellow card) 55'	Stadium: Stadion Rujevica; Attendance: 7,039; Referee: Fran Jović (Zagreb)

Source: Croatian Football Federation

=== Croatian Cup ===
20 September 2017 R1	Oriolik	0–3	Hajduk Split	Oriovac
15:30 CEST (UTC+02:00)	Vrljić (yellow card) 30'; Kokotović (yellow card) 43'	Report	Said 13', 90+2' (pen.); Barry (yellow card) 32'; Nižić (yellow card) 43'; Fomitschow (yellow card) 61'; Bašić 82'	Stadium: Igralište NK Oriolik; Attendance: 2,000; Referee: Fran Jović (Zagreb)

25 October 2017 R2	Šibenik	0–1	Hajduk Split	Šibenik
18:00 CEST (UTC+02:00)	Šare (red card) 31'; Fuštin (yellow card) 42'; Celić (yellow card) 45+2'; Brekalo (yellow card) 71'; Pecolaj (yellow card) 71'; Stanić (yellow card) 75'; Ćosić (yellow card) 86'	Report	Fomitschow 33'; Radošević (yellow card) 45'; Kožulj (yellow card) 59'; Tudor (yellow card) 60'; Erceg (yellow card) 71'; López (yellow card) 71'; Šehić (yellow card) 74'	Stadium: Stadion Šubićevac; Attendance: 3,000; Referee: Fran Jović (Zagreb)

29 November 2017 QF	Osijek	1–3	Hajduk Split	Osijek
18:00 CET (UTC+01:00)	Jambor (yellow card) 24'; Marić 59'; Mioč (yellow card) 76'; Škorić (yellow card) 80'	Report	Ohandza 39' (yellow card) 81'; Barry (yellow card) 42'; Said (yellow card) 45+1'; Nižić 68'; Tudor (yellow card) 77'; Stipica (yellow card) 90+2'; Erceg 90+3'	Stadium: Stadion Gradski vrt Attendance: 4,256; Referee: Mario Zebec (Cestica)

13 March 2018 SF	Lokomotiva	1–1 (a.e.t.) (2–4 p)	Hajduk Split	Zagreb
17:30 CET (UTC+01:00)	Musa (yellow card) 29'; Majstorović 55'; Šunjić (yellow card) 75'	Report	Fomitschow (yellow card) 30'; Barry 58'; Kovačević (yellow card) 87'; Bašić (yellow card) 96'	Stadium: Stadion Kranjčevićeva; Attendance: 2,480; Referee: Ivan Bebek (Rijeka)
	Penalties
	Majer (penalty missed); Ivanušec (penalty scored); Musa (penalty missed); Havojić (penalty scored)		(penalty scored) Caktaš (penalty scored) Said (penalty missed) Bašić (penalty scored) Filip (penalty scored) Radošević

23 May 2018 Final	Dinamo Zagreb	1–0	Hajduk Split	Vinkovci
19:00 CEST (UTC+02:00)	Stojanović (yellow card) 36'; Gavranović 55'; Hajrović (yellow card) 65'; Gojak (yellow card) 73'	Report	Barry (yellow card) 17'; Gyurcsó (yellow card) 29'; Futács (yellow card) 71'	Stadium: Stadion HNK Cibalia; Attendance: 8,208; Referee: Mario Zebec (Cestica)

Source: Croatian Football Federation

=== Europa League ===
==== Second qualifying round ====
13 July 2017 First leg	Hajduk Split (Croatia)	1–0	(Bulgaria) Levski Sofia	Dugopolje, Croatia
20:30 CEST (UTC+02:00)	Futács 24' (pen.); Erceg (yellow card) 51'; Nižić (yellow card) 65'; Barry (yellow card) 72'; Memolla (yellow card) 81'	Report	Jablonsky (yellow card) 20'; Goranov (yellow card) 56'; Panayotov (yellow card) 56'; Cvetković (yellow card) 59'; Vutov (yellow card) 65'	Stadium: Stadion Hrvatski vitezovi Attendance: 5,000; Referee: Mohammed Al-Hakim (Sweden)

20 July 2017 Second leg	Levski Sofia (Bulgaria)	1–2 (1–3 agg.)	(Croatia) Hajduk Split	Sofia, Bulgaria
20:00 EEST (UTC+03:00)	Cvetković (yellow card) 28'; Buș 69'	Report	López (yellow card) 60'; Ohandza 80'; Erceg 86'	Stadium: Stadion Georgi Asparuhov; Attendance: 0 Referee: Ali Palabıyık (Turkey)

==== Third qualifying round ====
27 July 2017 First leg	Brøndby (Denmark)	0–0	(Croatia) Hajduk Split	Copenhagen, Denmark
20:00 CEST (UTC+02:00)	Arajuuri (yellow card) 5' (yellow-red card) 90+3'; Fisker (yellow card) 80'	Report	Futács (yellow card) 34'; Erceg (yellow card) 59'	Stadium: Brøndby Stadium; Attendance: 12,535; Referee: Kevin Clancy (Scotland)

3 August 2017 Second leg	Hajduk Split (Croatia)	2–0 (2–0 agg.)	(Denmark) Brøndby	Split, Croatia
20:30 CEST (UTC+02:00)	Erceg 59', 63'; Futács (yellow card) 65'; Šehić (yellow card) 87'	Report	Crone (yellow card) 61'; Hermannsson (yellow card) 79'; Rønnow (yellow card) 86'; Mukhtar (yellow card) 87'	Stadium: Stadion Poljud; Attendance: 30,204; Referee: Orel Grinfeeld (Israel)

==== Play-off round ====
17 August 2017 First leg	Everton (England)	2–0	(Croatia) Hajduk Split	Liverpool, England
20:05 WEST (UTC+01:00)	Schneiderlin (yellow card) 19'; Keane 30'; Gueye 44'; Bešić (yellow card) 90+1'	Report	Memolla (yellow card) 41'	Stadium: Goodison Park; Attendance: 34,977; Referee: Ivan Kružliak (Slovakia)

24 August 2017 Second leg	Hajduk Split (Croatia)	1–1 (1–3 agg.)	(England) Everton	Split, Croatia
21:00 CEST (UTC+02:00)	Radošević 43'; Said (penalty missed) 65'; Radošević (yellow card) 74'; Erceg (yellow card) 90'	Report	Sigurðsson 46'; Bešić (yellow card) 72'	Stadium: Stadion Poljud; Attendance: 31,645; Referee: Sergei Karasev (Russia)

Source: uefa.com

== Player seasonal records ==
Updated 6 March 2021

=== Top scorers ===
Rank	Name	League	Europe	Cup	Total
1	(Italy) Said Ahmed Said	11	–	2	13
1	(Croatia) Ante Erceg	9	3	1	13
3	(Cameroon) Franck Ohandza	9	1	1	11
4	(Croatia) Mijo Caktaš	6	–	–	6
4	(Hungary) Ádám Gyurcsó	6	–	–	6
6	(Croatia) Josip Radošević	3	1	–	4
6	(Croatia) Zoran Nižić	3	–	1	4
6	(Croatia) Toma Bašić	3	–	1	4
9	(Portugal) Hugo Almeida	3	–	–	3
9	(Croatia) Nikola Vlašić	3	–	–	3
9	(Hungary) Márkó Futács	2	1	–	3
9	(The Gambia) Hamza Barry	2	–	1	3
13	(Spain) Borja López	2	–	–	2
13	(Greece) Savvas Gentsoglou	2	–	–	2
13	(Croatia) Fran Tudor	2	–	–	2
13	(Germany) André Fomitschow	1	–	1	2
17	(Croatia) Karlo Letica	1	–	–	1
17	(Croatia) Michele Šego	1	–	–	1
Own goals		1	–	–	1
TOTALS		70	6	8	84

Source: Competitive matches

=== Clean sheets ===
Rank	Name	League	Europe	Cup	Total
1	(Croatia) Karlo Letica	10	–	2	12
2	(Croatia) Dante Stipica	4	3	–	7
TOTALS		14	3	2	19

Source: Competitive matches

=== Disciplinary record ===
Number	Position	Name	1. HNL			Europa League			Croatian Cup			Total		
Number	Position	Name	Booked	(yellow card) (yellow-red card)	Sent off (straight red)	Booked	(yellow card) (yellow-red card)	Sent off (straight red)	Booked	(yellow card) (yellow-red card)	Sent off (straight red)	Booked	(yellow card) (yellow-red card)	Sent off (straight red)
1	GK	(Croatia) Dante Stipica	0	0	0	0	0	0	1	0	0	1	0	0
2	DF	(Brazil) Gustavo Carbonieri	1	0	0	0	0	0	0	0	0	1	0	0
3	DF	(Spain) Borja López	7	2	0	1	0	0	1	0	0	9	2	0
5	MF	(The Gambia) Hamza Barry	8	0	0	1	0	0	3	0	0	12	0	0
7	MF	(Hungary) Ádám Gyurcsó	1	0	0	0	0	0	1	0	0	2	0	0
9	FW	(Hungary) Márkó Futács	2	0	0	2	0	0	1	0	0	5	0	0
10	FW	(Portugal) Hugo Almeida	1	0	0	0	0	0	0	0	0	1	0	0
11	FW	(Cameroon) Franck Ohandza	1	0	1	0	0	0	1	0	0	2	0	1
14	MF	(Croatia) Josip Radošević	3	0	0	1	0	0	1	0	0	5	0	0
15	FW	(Croatia) Michele Šego	1	0	0	0	0	0	0	0	0	1	0	0
17	DF	(Croatia) Josip Juranović	2	0	0	0	0	0	0	0	0	2	0	0
18	MF	(Bosnia and Herzegovina) Zvonimir Kožulj	3	0	0	0	0	0	1	0	0	4	0	0
21	MF	(Croatia) Ivan Pešić	3	0	0	0	0	0	0	0	0	3	0	0
20	MF	(Croatia) Mijo Caktaš	3	0	0	0	0	0	0	0	0	3	0	0
22	FW	(Italy) Said Ahmed Said	8	0	0	0	0	0	1	0	0	9	0	0
23	DF	(Croatia) Zoran Nižić	4	1	0	1	0	0	1	0	0	6	1	0
24	DF	(Croatia) Mario Tičinović	1	0	0	0	0	0	0	0	0	1	0	0
25	GK	(Croatia) Karlo Letica	2	0	0	0	0	0	0	0	0	2	0	0
26	MF	(Croatia) Toma Bašić	3	0	0	0	0	0	1	0	0	4	0	0
27	DF	(Albania) Hysen Memolla	1	0	0	2	0	0	0	0	0	3	0	0
29	MF	(Bosnia and Herzegovina) Edin Šehić	2	0	0	1	0	0	1	0	0	4	0	0
31	DF	(Germany) André Fomitschow	3	1	0	0	0	0	2	0	0	5	1	0
32	DF	(Croatia) Fran Tudor	2	0	0	0	0	0	2	0	0	4	0	0
34	DF	(Kosovo) Ardian Ismajli	6	0	0	0	0	0	0	0	0	6	0	0
50	FW	(Croatia) Ante Erceg	3	0	0	3	0	0	1	0	0	7	0	0
77	DF	(Romania) Steliano Filip	1	0	0	0	0	0	0	0	0	1	0	0
90	MF	(Greece) Savvas Gentsoglou	5	0	0	0	0	0	0	0	0	5	0	0
99	FW	(Croatia) Franko Kovačević	1	0	0	0	0	0	1	0	0	2	0	0
TOTALS			78	4	1	12	0	0	20	0	0	110	4	1

Sources: Prva-HNL.hr, UEFA.com

=== Appearances and goals ===
Number	Position	Player	Apps	Goals	Apps	Goals	Apps	Goals	Apps	Goals
Number	Position	Player	Total		1. HNL (Note: First number represents appearances in starting eleven, while the second number indicates a substitute appearance.)		Europa League		Croatian Cup	
1	GK	(Croatia) Dante Stipica	25	0	17+0	0	6+0	0	2+0	0
2	DF	(Brazil) Gustavo Carbonieri	7	0	6+0	0	1+0	0	0+0	0
3	DF	(Spain) Borja López	36	2	28+0	2	5+0	0	3+0	0
4	DF	(Croatia) Petar Bosančić	4	0	0+3	0	0+0	0	1+0	0
5	MF	(The Gambia) Hamza Barry	42	3	27+4	2	6+0	0	5+0	1
7	MF	(Hungary) Ádám Gyurcsó	16	6	13+1	6	0+0	0	2+0	0
8	MF	(Croatia) Nikola Vlašić	12	3	5+1	3	6+0	0	0+0	0
9	FW	(Hungary) Márkó Futács	16	3	5+6	2	4+0	1	0+1	0
10	FW	(Portugal) Hugo Almeida	16	3	1+13	3	0+0	0	1+1	0
11	FW	(Cameroon) Franck Ohandza	23	11	15+3	9	1+3	1	1+0	1
14	MF	(Croatia) Josip Radošević	45	4	34+1	3	5+0	1	5+0	0
15	FW	(Croatia) Michele Šego	6	1	1+4	1	0+0	0	0+1	0
16	FW	(Croatia) Ivan Delić	2	0	0+2	0	0+0	0	0+0	0
17	DF	(Croatia) Josip Juranović	33	0	24+3	0	3+1	0	2+0	0
18	MF	(Bosnia and Herzegovina) Zvonimir Kožulj	30	0	9+14	0	2+3	0	1+1	0
19	MF	(Croatia) Darko Nejašmić	1	0	0+0	0	0+0	0	0+1	0
20	MF	(Croatia) Mijo Caktaš	15	6	12+1	6	0+0	0	2+0	0
21	FW	(Croatia) Ivan Pešić	16	0	7+5	0	0+3	0	0+1	0
22	FW	(Italy) Said Ahmed Said	36	13	22+6	11	1+3	0	4+0	2
23	DF	(Croatia) Zoran Nižić	33	4	23+0	3	6+0	0	4+0	1
24	DF	(Croatia) Mario Tičinović	11	0	2+8	0	0+0	0	1+0	0
25	GK	(Croatia) Karlo Letica	23	1	19+0	1	1+0	0	3+0	0
26	MF	(Croatia) Toma Bašić	28	4	23+4	3	0+1	0	1+2	1
27	DF	(Albania) Hysen Memolla	20	0	13+0	0	6+0	0	1+0	0
29	MF	(Bosnia and Herzegovina) Edin Šehić	15	0	1+11	0	0+1	0	2+0	0
31	DF	(Germany) André Fomitschow	24	2	20+0	1	0+0	0	4+0	1
32	MF	(Croatia) Fran Tudor	27	2	17+3	2	3+1	0	2+1	0
34	DF	(Kosovo) Ardian Ismajli	16	0	12+2	0	0+0	0	1+1	0
47	MF	(Croatia) Robert Jandrek	6	0	0+4	0	0+0	0	1+1	0
50	FW	(Croatia) Ante Erceg	23	13	14+1	9	5+1	3	2+0	1
77	MF	(Romania) Steliano Filip	5	0	2+2	0	0+0	0	0+1	0
90	MF	(Greece) Savvas Gentsoglou	34	2	22+2	2	6+0	0	3+1	0
91	MF	(Croatia) Tonio Teklić	3	0	0+2	0	0+0	0	0+1	0
99	FW	(Croatia) Franko Kovačević	6	0	2+2	0	0+0	0	1+1	0

Sources: Prva-HNL.hr, UEFA.com

=== Overview of statistics ===
Statistic	Overall	1. HNL	Croatian Cup	Europa League
Most appearances	Radošević (45)	Radošević (35)	Hamza & Radošević (5)	7 players (6)
Most starts	Radošević (44)	Radošević (34)	Hamza & Radošević (5)	6 players (6)
Most substitute appearances	Kožulj (18)	Kožulj (14)	T. Bašić (2)	4 players (3)
Most minutes played	Radošević (3,903)	Radošević (3,010)	Hamza (456)	Memolla, Nižić & Stipica (540)
Top goalscorer	Erceg & Said (13)	Said (11)	Said (2)	Erceg (3)
Most assists	Said (8)	Said (8)	–	Memolla (2)
Most yellow cards	Hamza (12)	Hamza & Said (8)	Hamza (3)	Erceg (3)
Most red cards	López (2)	López (2)	–	–
Last updated: 6 March 2021.

== Transfers ==
=== In ===
Date	Position	Player	From	Fee
21 April 2017	DF	(Bosnia and Herzegovina) Edin Šehić	(Croatia) NK Zagreb	Free
2 June 2017	MF	(Croatia) Josip Radošević	(Austria) Red Bull Salzburg	Free
6 June 2017	MF	(The Gambia) Hamza Barry	(Cyprus) Apollon Limassol	Undisclosed
13 June 2017	FW	(Croatia) Ivan Pešić	(Croatia) RNK Split	Free
15 June 2017	FW	(Croatia) Franko Kovačević	(Croatia) HNK Rijeka	N/A
23 June 2017	DF	(Germany) André Fomitschow	(Netherlands) NEC Nijmegen	Free
27 June 2017	MF	(Greece) Savvas Gentsoglou	(Italy) Bari 1908	Free
29 June 2017	DF	(Spain) Borja López	(Spain) FC Barcelona B	Undisclosed
7 July 2017	DF	(Brazil) Gustavo Carbonieri	(Brazil) Rio Preto	Free
31 August 2017	FW	(Portugal) Hugo Almeida	(Greece) AEK Athens	Free
24 January 2018	DF	(Romania) Steliano Filip	(Romania) FC Dinamo București	350.000 €
25 January 2018	MF	(Croatia) Mijo Caktaš	(Russia) Rubin Kazan	Free
15 February 2018	MF	(Croatia) Stanko Jurić	(Croatia) NK Dugopolje	Free

Total spending: ▼350.000 €

=== Out ===
Date	Position	Player	To	Fee
4 June 2017	DF	(Bosnia and Herzegovina) Josip Kvesić	(Cyprus) Anorhosis Famagusta	Free (released)
9 June 2017	DF	(Croatia) Ante Vrljičak	(Croatia) NK Slaven Belupo	Free (released)
14 June 2017	DF	(Croatia) Marko Ćosić	(Croatia) NK Inter Zaprešić	Loan ended
30 June 2017	DF	(Bulgaria) Georgi Terziev	(Bulgaria) Ludogorets	Loan ended
1 July 2017	MF	(Croatia) Marko Bencun	(Croatia) NK Inter Zaprešić	Free (released)
5 July 2017	MF	(Brazil) Jefferson	(Portugal) G.D. Chaves	200.000 €
31 August 2017	FW	(Croatia) Ivan Mastelić		Free (released)
31 August 2017	DF	(Croatia) Zvonimir Milić	(Croatia) HNK Cibalia Vinkovci	Free (released)
31 August 2017	MF	(Croatia) Nikola Vlašić	(England) Everton F.C.	8.700.000 €
8 January 2018	MF	(Croatia) Ante Erceg	(United Arab Emirates) Al Ahli Shabab	1.500.000 €
10 January 2018	MF	(Croatia) Ivan Pešić	(Romania) FC Dinamo București	Free
15 January 2018	FW	(Croatia) Boris Rapaić	(Turkey) Fenerbahçe S.K.	Free (released)

Total income: ▲10.200.000 €

Total expenditure: ▲9.850.000 €

=== Promoted from youth squad ===
Position	Player	Age
GK	(Croatia) Karlo Letica	20
MF	(Croatia) Tonio Teklić	18
FW	(Croatia) Michele Šego	17

=== Loans in ===
Date	Position	Player	From	Until
17 January 2018	MF	(Hungary) Ádám Gyurcsó	(Poland) Pogoń Szczecin	30 June 2018
16 February 2018	DF	(Croatia) Mario Tičinović	(Belgium) K.S.C. Lokeren	30 June 2018

=== Loans out ===
Date	Position	Player	To	Until
31 August 2017	DF	(Croatia) Bruno Budalić	(Croatia) RNK Split	30 June 2018^{1}
31 August 2017	FW	(Australia) Deni Jurić	(Croatia) NK Solin	30 June 2018
31 August 2017	MF	(Australia) Anthony Kalik	(Australia) Sydney FC	30 June 2018
31 August 2017	MF	(Croatia) Frane Vojković	(Croatia) HNK Cibalia	30 June 2018
31 January 2018	MF	(Croatia) Mario Lovre Vojković	(Croatia) NK Dugopolje	29 June 2018
31 January 2018	MF	(Croatia) Robert Jandrek	(Croatia) NK Dugopolje	29 June 2018
31 January 2018	MF	(Bosnia and Herzegovina) Edin Šehić	(Slovenia) NK Rudar Velenje	30 June 2018

^{1} Loan was terminated on 10 February 2018

Sources: Glasilo Hrvatskog nogometnog saveza
