= 2017–18 GNK Dinamo Zagreb season =

GNK Dinamo Zagreb
2017–18 season
- Chairman: Mirko Barišić
- Manager: Mario Cvitanović (from 13 July, until 10 March); Nikola Jurčević (from 12 March, until 14 May); Nenad Bjelica (from 15 May)
- Stadium: Maksimir Stadium
- Prva HNL: 1st
- Croatian Cup: Winners
- UEFA Europa League: Play-off round (knocked out by Skënderbeu Korçë)
- Top goalscorer: League: El Arabi Hillel Soudani (17); All: El Arabi Hillel Soudani (18)
- Highest home attendance: 13,500 (vs. Hajduk Split)
- Lowest home attendance: 514 (vs. Rudeš)
Home colours	Away colours	Third colours

The 2017–18 season is Dinamo Zagreb's 27th season in the Croatian First Division and 105th year in existence as a football club.

This is the first season since 2006 that Dinamo Zagreb failed to qualify for the group stages of a European competition.

Mario Cvitanović was the manager of the club and had moved to club to 1st position, going unbeaten for 21 league games, but after two abysmal performances against rivals HNK Rijeka and feeder-club NK Lokomotiva, both of which were defeats by a score of 4–1, he ultimately resigned as manager of the club on 10 March 2018.

Nikola Jurčević then took over as head coach, returning to Dinamo, having managed them in the 2003–04 season. Dinamo confirmed the title following Rijeka and Hajduk's draws with Cibalia and Osijek, respectively. However, on 14 May, another poor form resulted in Nikola Jurčević's dismissal as manager, being head coach for just 65 days.

After much speculation, Nenad Bjelica took over as manager, signing a reported two-year contract. He won the Croatian Football Cup with the club, beating Hajduk Split in the final. This season was a major success for Dinamo, as the club won the domestic double.

On 6 June 2018, the former executive director and advisor of the club, Zdravko Mamić, was sentenced to a six-and-a-half-year prison sentence for corruption. On the same day, the club released a statement on their official website, in which they claimed that they were "shocked" with the verdict, also claiming that they "firmly believe" that Zdravko Mamić and the others who were sentenced are innocent.

== Season review ==
=== Competitions ===
==== HT PrvaLiga ====
15 July: Dinamo Zagreb won their first game of the season against Istra 1961 by a result of 2–0, with goals coming from defensive midfielder Nikola Moro and centre-back Filip Benković.

21 July: Dinamo Zagreb won against HNK Cibalia by a result 4–0, with a brace from centre-forward Armin Hodžić and a goal each from winger Júnior Fernándes and Ante Ćorić.

30 July: Dinamo Zagreb were held to a draw by NK Osijek in their first away game of the season, with Nikola Moro clinching a goal in a 1–1 draw.

6 August: Dinamo Zagreb won at home against old rivals Hajduk Split, by a score of 3–1. Goals from Ante Ćorić, Dani Olmo and El Arabi Hillel Soudani were enough to secure a win in the first of four meetings between the two sides.

11 August: Dinamo Zagreb beat league champions HNK Rijeka at the Stadion Rujevica by a result of 2–0 with a brace from Júnior Fernándes.

20 August: Dinamo Zagreb secure a 2–0 win over Slaven Belupo with goals from attacking midfielder Ivan Fiolić and centre-back Amir Rrahmani.

27 August: A hat-trick from El Arabi Hillel Soudani is enough to secure Dinamo Zagreb a comfortable 3–0 win over feeder-club NK Lokomotiva.

9 September: Dinamo Zagreb earn a hard-fought home win over newly-promoted NK Rudeš, with goals from Ángelo Henríquez, El Arabi Hillel Soudani and Filip Benković securing a win.

16 September: Goals from Ángelo Henríquez, El Arabi Hillel Soudani and Tongo Doumbia secure a 3–1 away win for Dinamo Zagreb against NK Inter Zaprešić.

24 September: Dinamo are held to a stalemate (0–0 draw) away to Istra 1961.

30 September: Dinamo secure a 5–2 away win against HNK Cibalia, with a brace from Dani Olmo and El Arabi Hillel Soudani and a goal from Armin Hodžić.

14 October: A last-minute equalizer from Ángelo Henríquez rescued Dinamo from their first defeat of the season against NK Osijek in a 1–1 draw.

21 October: Dinamo drew 2–2 with rivals Hajduk Split in an entertaining and dramatic match, as goals from Filip Benković in the 89th minute and Ángelo Henríquez in the 90th minute gave Dinamo a 2–1 lead before Ante Erceg struck a late equalizer in the 94th minute.

28 October: Dinamo moved 9 points clear of league champions HNK Rijeka and 7 points clear of second-placed NK Osijek at the top of the table as a goal from Nikola Moro and a brace from El Arabi Hillel Soudani sealed a 3–1 win for Dinamo against HNK Rijeka.

5 November: Dinamo won 1–0 against NK Slaven Belupo with a late goal from Amer Gojak.

26 November: Dinamo drew 1–1 with newly promoted side NK Rudeš.

3 December: Dinamo won 1–0 against Inter Zaprešić with a goal from Spanish footballer Dani Olmo.

9 December: Dinamo secured a 5–1 home win against NK Istra 1961 with goals from Nikola Moro, El Arabi Hillel Soudani, Ante Ćorić and Armin Hodžić (2).

16 December: Dinamo won 1–0 against HNK Cibalia with a goal from Ángelo Henríquez.

10 February: Dinamo won 4–2 in entertaining display against NK Osijek, with El Arabi Hillel Soudani, Arijan Ademi (2) and Dani Olmo getting on the scoresheet.

18 February: Dinamo lost 1–0 against Hajduk Split at home.

4 March: Dinamo beat Slaven Belupo by a score of 1–0, with Mario Gavranović scoring the goal.

7 March: Dinamo suffered a 4–1 defeat by HNK Rijeka, with Mario Gavranović scoring the only goal for Dinamo.

10 March: Dinamo suffered a humiliating defeat by NK Lokomotiva, their very own feeder-club, with Dani Olmo scoring the only goal for the club. Following the defeat, Mario Cvitanović resigned as manager of the club. Nikola Jurčević then took over as head coach.

17 March: Dinamo won 2–0 against NK Rudeš, with Mario Gavranović and Dani Olmo scoring.

31 March: Dinamo drew 0–0 with NK Inter Zaprešić.

8 April: Dinamo secured a 4–0 win over Istra 1961 with El Arabi Hillel Soudani, Dani Olmo, Ivan Fiolić and Mario Gavranović scoring one goal each.

14 April: Dinamo beat HNK Cibalia by a score of 2–0, with El Arabi Hillel Soudani scoring a brace.

18 April: Dinamo suffered a setback in their title chase following a surprise 1–0 home loss to NK Osijek.

22 April: Dinamo secured a 2–1 away win over rivals Hajduk Split with Mario Gavranović scoring twice.

28 April: Dinamo suffered another setback in their title chase after a 1–0 loss to HNK Rijeka at home. The Dinamo line-up and bench notably included many reserve and academy players, due to the unavailability of many first-team players because of injuries or suspensions.

4 May: Dinamo drew 2–2 with Slaven Belupo, with Mario Budimir and Filip Benković scoring a goal each for Dinamo.

8 May: Dinamo suffered their second successive defeat against feeder-club NK Lokomotiva, losing 3–1 at the Stadion Kranjčevićeva, with El Arabi Hillel Soudani scoring the only goal.

14 May: Dinamo were crowned league champions, despite losing 1–0 to NK Rudeš, but Rijeka and Hajduk's draws made it mathematically impossible for Dinamo to lose first place at the top of the league table.

19 May: Dinamo finished the season with a 3–1 win over Inter Zaprešić with El Arabi Hillel Soudani and Mario Gavranović (2) scoring the goals.

==== Croatian Football Cup ====
20 September: Dinamo won 6–0 away to NK Borac Imbriovec in the 1st round of the Croatian Football Cup with Ivan Fiolić and Alen Jurilj scoring a brace and Dani Olmo and Armin Hodžić scoring once.

31 October: Dinamo played second-tier side NK Novigrad in the 2nd round. After the regular game ended 0–0, the match was decided on penalties. Dinamo won 3–2.

29 November: Dinamo played NK Istra 1961 and won 4–2. Ángelo Henríquez marked off a fine performance with a hat-trick.

4 April : Dinamo beat HNK Rijeka in the semi-final by a score of 3–0, with Izet Hajrović, El Arabi Hillel Soudani and Ante Ćorić scoring the goals. (The match was originally scheduled for 28 February, but due to unfavourable weather conditions, it was moved to 4 April).

23 May: Dinamo won the 2018 Croatian Football Cup Final after beating bitter rivals Hajduk Split, with Mario Gavranović scoring the only goal, although the game was controversially overshadowed by the allegedly poor refereeing decisions made by referee Mario Zebec.

== Kit information ==
Supplier: adidas / Sponsor: Hrvatski Telekom

Home	Away	Third

== Squad information ==
As of 19 July 2017

=== First team squad ===
Note: Games played and goals scored include all competitions.

No.	Name	Nat	Position	Since	Date of Birth (Age)	Signed from
Goalkeepers
1	Danijel Zagorac	(Croatia)	GK	2016	7 February 1987 (age 30)	(Croatia) Split
33	Marko Mikulić	(Croatia)	GK	2009	30 January 1994 (age 23)	(Croatia) Academy
40	Dominik Livaković	(Croatia)	GK	2016	9 January 1995 (age 22)	(Croatia) Zagreb
Centerbacks
13	Amir Rrahmani	(Kosovo)	CB	2016	24 February 1994 (age 23)	(Croatia) Split
26	Filip Benković	(Croatia)	CB	2015	13 July 1997 (age 20)	(Croatia) Academy
31	Marko Lešković	(Croatia)	CB	2016	27 April 1991 (age 26)	(Croatia) Rijeka
55	Dino Perić	(Croatia)	CB	2017	12 July 1994 (age 23)	(Croatia) Lokomotiva
Fullbacks
3	Borna Sosa	(Croatia)	LB	2015	21 January 1998 (age 19)	(Croatia) Academy
6	Jan Lecjaks	(Czech Republic)	LB	2017	9 August 1990 (age 27)	(Switzerland) Young Boys
30	Petar Stojanović	(Slovenia)	RB	2016	7 October 1995 (age 21)	(Slovenia) Maribor
77	Alexandru Mățel	(Romania)	RB	2015	17 October 1989 (age 27)	(Romania) Astra Giurgiu
Defensive Midfielders
5	Arijan Ademi (vice-captain)	(North Macedonia)	DM	2010	29 May 1991 (age 26)	(Croatia) Šibenik
27	Nikola Moro	(Croatia)	DM	2016	12 March 1998 (age 19)	(Croatia) Dinamo Zagreb B
Central Midfielders
4	Tongo Doumbia	(Mali)	CM	2017	6 August 1989 (age 28)	(France) Toulouse
28	Zvonko Pamić	(Croatia)	CM	2013	4 February 1991 (age 26)	(Croatia) Karlovac
Attacking Midfielders
10	Ante Ćorić	(Croatia)	AM	2014	14 April 1997 (age 20)	(Austria) Red Bull Salzburg
14	Amer Gojak	(Bosnia and Herzegovina)	AM	2015	13 February 1997 (age 20)	(Bosnia and Herzegovina) Olimpic
29	Ivan Fiolić	(Croatia)	AM	2017	29 April 1996 (age 21)	(Croatia) Lokomotiva
Forwards
7	Dani Olmo	(Spain)	AM	2015	7 May 1998 (age 19)	(Croatia) Dinamo Zagreb B
8	Izet Hajrović	(Bosnia and Herzegovina)	RW	2018	4 August 1991 (age 26)	Free Agent
2	El Arabi Hillel Soudani	(Algeria)	CF	2013	25 November 1987 (age 29)	(Portugal) Vitória de Guimarães
11	Mario Gavranović	(Switzerland)	CF	2018	November 24, 1989 (age 28)	(Croatia) HNK Rijeka
15	Armin Hodžić	(Bosnia and Herzegovina)	SS	2014	17 November 1994 (age 22)	(England) Liverpool

== Transfers ==
=== Transfers In ===
Position	Name	Age	Type	Notes	Fee	Source
DF	(Kosovo) Amir Rrahmani	23	Loan Return (from (Croatia) Lokomotiva)	Loan return.	Free	
DF	(Croatia) Dino Perić	22	Transfer (from (Croatia) Lokomotiva)	Permanent transfer.	Undisclosed	
DF	(Czech Republic) Jan Lecjaks	26	Transfer (from (Switzerland) Young Boys)	Permanent transfer.	€500,000	
DF	(Croatia) Mario Musa	26	Loan Return (from (Sweden) Hammarby)	Loan return.	Free	
MF	(Mali) Tongo Doumbia	27	Transfer (from (France) Toulouse)	Permanent transfer.	€800,000	
MF	(Croatia) Marko Rog	21	Loan Return (from (Italy) Napoli)	Loan return.	Free	
MF	(Iran) Ali Karimi	23	Loan Return (from (Croatia) Lokomotiva)	Loan return.	Free	
FW	(Albania) Endri Çekiçi	20	Loan Return (from (Croatia) Lokomotiva)	Loan return.	Free	
FW	(Chile) Júnior Fernándes	29	Loan Return (from (Turkey) Alanyaspor)	Loan return.	Free	
Total				€1,300,000		

=== Transfers Out ===
Position	Name	Age	Type	Notes	Fee	Source
DF	(Croatia) Gordon Schildenfeld	32	Transfer (to (Cyprus) Anorthosis)	Permanent transfer on a free.	Undisclosed	
DF	(Croatia) Dino Perić	22	Loan Return (to (Croatia) Lokomotiva)	Loan return after 1-year loan spell.	Free	
DF	(Croatia) Vinko Soldo	19	Loan (to (Croatia) Lokomotiva)	1-year loan spell.	Free	
DF	(Croatia) Josip Pivarić	28	Transfer (to (Ukraine) Dynamo Kyiv)	Permanent transfer.	€2,000,000	
DF	(Croatia) Mario Musa	27	Loan (to (Croatia) Lokomotiva)	1-year loan spell.	Free	
MF	(Croatia) Marko Rog	21	Transfer (to (Italy) Napoli)	Permanent transfer.	€13,000,000	
MF	(Croatia) Domagoj Pavičić	23	Loan (to (Croatia) Rijeka)	6-month loan spell. (until January)	Free	
MF	(Iran) Ali Karimi	23	Transfer (to (Iran) Sepahan)	Permanent transfer on a free.	Free	
MF	(Portugal) Gonçalo	30	Transfer (to (Portugal) Desportivo Aves)	Permanent transfer.	Free	
MF	(Portugal) Paulo Machado	31	Transfer (to (Portugal) Desportivo Aves)	Permanent transfer, after contract expiration.	Free	
FW	(Brazil) Sammir	30	Transfer (to (China) Wuhan Zall)	Permanent transfer.	Undisclosed	
FW	(Albania) Endri Çekiçi	20	Loan (to (Croatia) Dinamo Zagreb Academy)	1-year loan spell.	Free	
FW	(Brazil) Marcos Guilherme	21	Loan Return (to (Brazil) Atlético Paranaense)	Loan return after 6-month loan spell.	Free	
FW	(Croatia) Mario Šitum	25	Loan (to (Poland) Lech Poznań)	1-year loan spell.	Free	
FW	(Chile) Júnior Fernándes	29	Transfer (to (Turkey) Alanyaspor)	Permanent transfer.	€2,000,000	
Total				€17,000,000		

== Competitions ==
=== Overview ===
Competition	Record							
Competition	Pld	W	D	L	GF	GA	GD	Win %
Prva HNL	36	22	7	7	68	34	+34	61.11
Cup	5	4	1	0	14	2	+12	80.00
Europa League	4	1	3	0	3	2	+1	25.00
Total	45	27	11	7	85	38	+47	60.00

Last updated: 23 May 2018
Source: Competitions

== Competitions ==
=== HT Prva Liga ===
==== League table ====
Pos	Team	Pld	W	D	L	GF	GA	GD	Pts	Qualification or relegation
1	Dinamo Zagreb (C)	36	22	7	7	68	34	+34	73	Qualification for the Champions League second qualifying round
2	Rijeka	36	22	4	10	75	32	+43	70	Qualification for the Europa League third qualifying round (Note: Since the winners of the 2017–18 Croatian Football Cup, Dinamo Zagreb, qualified for European competition based on league position, the spot awarded to the cup winners (Europa League third qualifying round) was passed to the runners-up, the spot awarded to the runners-up was passed to the third-placed team, and the spot awarded to the third-placed team was passed to the fourth-placed team.)
3	Hajduk Split	36	19	9	8	70	38	+32	66	Qualification for the Europa League second qualifying round
4	Osijek	36	14	14	8	53	38	+15	56	Qualification for the Europa League first qualifying round
5	Lokomotiva	36	14	9	13	47	48	−1	51	

Source: PrvaHNL.hr
Rules for classification: 1) Points; 2) Head-to-head points; 3) Head-to-head goal difference; 4) Head-to-head goals scored (at home if two teams tied); 5) Goal difference; 6) Goals scored; 7) Play-off
(Note: Criteria 2–4 and 7 is only used if deciding champion, teams to international competition or teams for relegation and in that case criteria 6 will not be used).
(C) Champions

==== Matches ====
Date	Venue	Opponents	Score	Dinamo Zagreb scorer(s)	Report
15 July 2017	Stadion Maksimir, Zagreb	(Croatia) Istra 1961	2–0	(Croatia) Moro, (Croatia) Benković	PrvaHNL
21 July 2017	Stadion Maksimir, Zagreb	(Croatia) Cibalia	4–0	(Bosnia and Herzegovina) Hodžić (2), (Chile) Fernándes, (Croatia) Ćorić	PrvaHNL
30 July 2017	Stadion Gradski vrt, Osijek	(Croatia) Osijek	1–1	(Croatia) Moro	PrvaHNL
6 August 2017	Stadion Maksimir, Zagreb	(Croatia) Hajduk Split	3–1	(Croatia) Ćorić, (Spain) Olmo, (Algeria) Soudani	PrvaHNL
11 August 2017	Stadion Rujevica, Rijeka	(Croatia) Rijeka	2–0	(Chile) Fernándes (2)	PrvaHNL
20 August 2017	Stadion Maksimir, Zagreb	(Croatia) Slaven Belupo	2–0	(Croatia) Fiolić, (Kosovo) Rrahmani	
27 August 2017	Stadion Kranjčevićeva, Zagreb	(Croatia) Lokomotiva	3–0	(Algeria) Soudani (3)	
9 September 2017	Stadion Maksimir, Zagreb	(Croatia) Rudeš	3–2	(Chile) Henríquez, (Algeria) Soudani, (Croatia) Benković	
16 September 2017	Stadion ŠRC Zaprešić, Zaprešić	(Croatia) Inter Zaprešić	3–1	(Chile) Henríquez, (Algeria) Soudani, (Mali) Doumbia	
24 September 2017	Stadion Aldo Drosina, Pula	(Croatia) Istra 1961	0–0		
30 September 2017	Stadion HNK Cibalia, Vinkovci	(Croatia) Cibalia	5–2	(Spain) Olmo (2), (Algeria) Soudani (2), (Bosnia and Herzegovina) Hodžić	
14 October 2017	Stadion Maksimir, Zagreb	(Croatia) Osijek	1–1	(Chile) Henríquez	
21 October 2017	Stadion Poljud, Split	(Croatia) Hajduk Split	2–2	(Croatia) Benković, (Chile) Henríquez	
28 October 2017	Stadion Maksimir, Zagreb	(Croatia) Rijeka	3–1	(Croatia) Moro, (Algeria) Soudani (2)	
5 November 2017	Gradski stadion, Koprivnica	(Croatia) Slaven Belupo	1–0	(Bosnia and Herzegovina) Gojak	
19 November 2017	Stadion Maksimir, Zagreb	(Croatia) Lokomotiva	2–0	(Croatia) Fiolić, (Czech Republic) Lecjaks	
26 November 2017	Stadion Kranjčevićeva, Zagreb	(Croatia) Rudeš	1–1	(Bosnia and Herzegovina) Hodžić	
3 December 2017	Stadion Maksimir, Zagreb	(Croatia) Inter Zaprešić	1–0	(Spain) Olmo	
9 December 2017	Stadion Maksimir, Zagreb	(Croatia) Istra 1961	5–1	(Croatia) Moro, (Algeria) Soudani, (Croatia) Ćorić, (Bosnia and Herzegovina) Hodžić (2)	
16 December 2017	Stadion Maksimir, Zagreb	(Croatia) Cibalia	1–0	(Chile) Henríquez	
10 February 2018	Stadion Gradski vrt, Osijek	(Croatia) Osijek	4–2	(Algeria) Soudani, (North Macedonia) Ademi (2), (Spain) Olmo	
18 February 2018	Stadion Maksimir, Zagreb	(Croatia) Hajduk Split	0–1		
4 March 2018	Stadion Maksimir, Zagreb	(Croatia) Slaven Belupo	1–0	(Switzerland) Gavranović	
7 March 2018	Stadion Rujevica, Rijeka	(Croatia) Rijeka	1–4	(Switzerland) Gavranović	
10 March 2018	Stadion Maksimir, Zagreb	(Croatia) Lokomotiva	1–4	(Spain) Olmo	
17 March 2018	Stadion Maksimir, Zagreb	(Croatia) Rudeš	2–0	(Switzerland) Gavranović, (Spain) Olmo	
31 March 2018	Stadion ŠRC Zaprešić, Zaprešić	(Croatia) Inter Zaprešić	0–0		
8 April 2018	Stadion Aldo Drosina, Pula	(Croatia) Istra 1961	4–0	(Algeria) Soudani, (Spain) Olmo, (Croatia) Fiolić, (Switzerland) Gavranović	
14 April 2018	Stadion HNK Cibalia, Vinkovci	(Croatia) Cibalia	2–0	(Algeria) Soudani (2)	
18 April 2018	Stadion Maksimir, Zagreb	(Croatia) Osijek	0–1		
22 April 2018	Stadion Poljud, Split	(Croatia) Hajduk Split	2–1	(Switzerland) Gavranović (2)	
28 April 2018	Stadion Maksimir, Zagreb	(Croatia) Rijeka	0–1		
4 May 2018	Gradski stadion, Koprivnica	(Croatia) Slaven Belupo	2–2	(Croatia) Budimir, (Croatia) Benković	
8 May 2018	Stadion Kranjčevićeva, Zagreb	(Croatia) Lokomotiva	1–3	(Algeria) Soudani	
14 May 2018	Stadion Kranjčevićeva, Zagreb	(Croatia) Rudeš	0–1		
19 May 2018	Stadion Maksimir, Zagreb	(Croatia) Inter Zaprešić	3–1	(Algeria) Soudani, (Switzerland) Gavranović (2)	

=== Croatian Football Cup ===
==== Matches ====
Date	Venue	Opponents	Score	Dinamo Zagreb scorer(s)	Report
2017–18 Croatian Football Cup – First round
20 September 2017	Igralište NK Borac, Imbriovec	(Croatia) Borac Imbriovec	6–0	(Bosnia and Herzegovina) Hodžić, (Croatia) Fiolić (2), (Spain) Olmo, (Croatia) Jurilj (2)	SofaScore
2017–18 Croatian Football Cup – Second round
31 October 2017	Igralište Lako, Novigrad	(Croatia) Novigrad	0–0		SofaScore
2017–18 Croatian Football Cup – Quarter-finals
29 November 2017	Stadion Maksimir, Zagreb	(Croatia) Istra 1961	4–2	(Chile) Henríquez (3), (North Macedonia) Ademi	SofaScore
2017–18 Croatian Football Cup – Semi-finals
4 April 2018	Stadion Maksimir, Zagreb	(Croatia) Rijeka	3–0	(Bosnia and Herzegovina) Hajrović, (Algeria) Soudani, (Croatia) Ćorić	SofaScore
2017–18 Croatian Football Cup – Final
23 May 2018	Stadion HNK Cibalia, Vinkovci	(Croatia) Hajduk Split	1–0	(Switzerland) Gavranović	SofaScore

=== UEFA Europa League ===
==== Matches ====
Date	Venue	Opponents	Score	Dinamo Zagreb scorer(s)	Report
2017–18 UEFA Europa League – Third qualifying round
27 July 2017	Stadion Maksimir, Zagreb	(Norway) Odd	2–1	(Bosnia and Herzegovina) Hodžić, (Chile) Fernándes	UEFA.com
3 August 2017	Skagerak Arena, Skien	(Norway) Odd	0–0		UEFA.com
2017–18 UEFA Europa League – Play-off round
17 August 2017	Stadion Maksimir, Zagreb	(Albania) Skënderbeu Korçë	1–1	(Chile) Henríquez	UEFA.com
24 August 2017	Elbasan Arena, Elbasan	(Albania) Skënderbeu Korçë	0–0 (a)		UEFA.com

== Squad statistics ==
=== Appearances ===
List contains only players who are currently at the club.

No.	Pos.	Nat.	Name	First League	Football Cup	Europa League	Total
1	GK	(Croatia)	Danijel Zagorac	2	2	0	4
2	FW	(Algeria)	El Arabi Hillel Soudani	19	2	3	24
3	DF	(Croatia)	Borna Sosa	17	1	0	18
4	MF	(Mali)	Tongo Doumbia	21	1	2	24
5	MF	(North Macedonia)	Arijan Ademi (Captain)	14	1	0	15
6	DF	(Czech Republic)	Jan Lecjaks	12	1	4	17
7	MF	(Spain)	Dani Olmo	23	2	2	27
8	MF	(Bosnia and Herzegovina)	Izet Hajrović	6	0	0	6
10	MF	(Croatia)	Ante Ćorić	12	2	3	17
11	FW	(Switzerland)	Mario Gavranović	6	0	0	6
13	DF	(Kosovo)	Amir Rrahmani	16	1	2	19
14	MF	(Bosnia and Herzegovina)	Amer Gojak	15	1	4	20
15	FW	(Bosnia and Herzegovina)	Armin Hodžić	21	1	4	26
19	MF	(Croatia)	Ivan Fiolić	13	1	2	16
26	DF	(Croatia)	Filip Benković	19	2	2	23
27	MF	(Croatia)	Nikola Moro	24	1	4	29
30	DF	(Slovenia)	Petar Stojanović	22	2	4	28
31	DF	(Croatia)	Marko Lešković	12	2	1	15
40	GK	(Croatia)	Dominik Livaković	24	0	4	28
55	DF	(Croatia)	Dino Perić	1	0	0	1
77	DF	(Romania)	Alexandru Mățel	3	0	0	3

=== Goalscorers ===
The list is sorted by shirt number when total goals are equal.

Rnk	Pos	No.	Player	First League	Football Cup	Europa League	Total
1	CF	2	(Algeria) El Arabi Hillel Soudani	12	0	0	12
2	CF	9	(Chile) Ángelo Henríquez	5	3	1	9
3	LW	7	(Spain) Dani Olmo	7	1	0	8
4	SS	15	(Bosnia and Herzegovina) Armin Hodžić	6	1	1	8
5	AM	29	(Croatia) Ivan Fiolić	2	2	0	4
6	CF	78	(Chile) Júnior Fernándes	3	0	1	4
7	DM	5	(North Macedonia) Arijan Ademi	2	1	0	3
8	AM	10	(Croatia) Ante Ćorić	3	0	0	3
9	CF	11	(Switzerland) Mario Gavranović	3	0	0	3
10	CB	26	(Croatia) Filip Benković	3	0	0	3
11	DM	27	(Croatia) Nikola Moro	3	0	0	3
12	CF	16	(Croatia) Alen Jurilj	0	2	0	2
13	CM	4	(Mali) Tongo Doumbia	1	0	0	1
14	LB	6	(Czech Republic) Jan Lecjaks	1	0	0	1
15	CB	13	(Kosovo) Amir Rrahmani	1	0	0	1
16	AM	14	(Bosnia and Herzegovina) Amer Gojak	1	0	0	1

=== Clean Sheets ===
Rnk	Pos	No.	Player	First League	Football Cup	Europa League	Total
1	GK	40	(Croatia) Dominik Livaković	12	0	2	14
2	GK	1	(Croatia) Danijel Zagorac	1	1	0	2
3	GK	33	(Croatia) Marko Mikulić	–	–	–	–
Total				13	1	4	18
