= 2018 Croatian Football Cup final =

- Event: 2017–18 Croatian Cup
Dinamo Zagreb	Hajduk Split
1	0
- Date: 23 May 2018
- Venue: Stadion HNK Cibalia, Vinkovci
- Referee: Mario Zebec (Cestica)
- Attendance: 8,208

The 2018 Croatian Cup final between Dinamo Zagreb and Hajduk Split was played on 23 May 2018 at Stadion HNK Cibalia in Vinkovci. This was the first meeting of the two most popular Croatian clubs in the final since 2009. Dinamo Zagreb secured a domestic double after winning both the cup and the 2017–18 Croatian First Football League.

== Road to the final ==
Dinamo Zagreb		Round	Hajduk Split	
Opponent	Result		Opponent	Result
Borac Imbriovec	6–0	First round	Oriolik	3–0
Novigrad	0−0 (3–2 p)	Second round	Šibenik	1–0
Istra 1961	4–2	Quarter-finals	Osijek	3–1
Rijeka	3–0	Semi-finals	Lokomotiva	1–1 (4–2 p)

== Match details ==
23 May 2018
19:00

Dinamo Zagreb	1−0	Hajduk Split
Gavranović 55'	Report

Stadion HNK Cibalia, Vinkovci
Attendance: 8,208
Referee: Mario Zebec (Cestica)

Dinamo Zagreb	Hajduk Split

DINAMO ZAGREB:
GK	1	(Croatia) Danijel Zagorac
FW	2	(Algeria) El Arbi Hillel Soudani		(substituted off) 90'
MF	5	(North Macedonia) Arijan Ademi (c)
DF	6	(Czech Republic) Jan Lecjaks
MF	7	(Spain) Dani Olmo		(substituted off) 82'
MF	8	(Bosnia and Herzegovina) Izet Hajrović	(yellow card) 65'	(substituted off) 69'
FW	11	(Switzerland) Mario Gavranović
DF	13	(Kosovo) Amir Rrahmani
MF	14	(Bosnia and Herzegovina) Amer Gojak	(yellow card) 73'
DF	30	(Slovenia) Petar Stojanović	(yellow card) 36'
DF	55	(Croatia) Dino Perić
Substitutes:
GK	40	(Croatia) Dominik Livaković
FW	9	(Croatia) Mario Budimir
MF	10	(Croatia) Ante Ćorić
FW	15	(Bosnia and Herzegovina) Armin Hodžić		(substituted on) 82'
MF	19	(Croatia) Ivan Fiolić		(substituted on) 69'
DF	21	(Brazil) Gabriel Magalhães
DF	26	(Croatia) Filip Benković		(substituted on) 90'
Manager:
(Croatia) Nenad Bjelica

HAJDUK SPLIT:
GK	1	(Croatia) Dante Stipica
MF	5	(The Gambia) Hamza Barry	(yellow card) 17'	(substituted off) 76'
MF	7	(Hungary) Ádám Gyurcsó	(yellow card) 29'
MF	14	(Croatia) Josip Radošević
MF	20	(Croatia) Mijo Caktaš
FW	22	(Italy) Said Ahmed Said		(substituted off) 70'
DF	23	(Croatia) Zoran Nižić (c)
DF	24	(Croatia) Mario Tičinović		(substituted off) 59'
DF	31	(Germany) André Fomitschow
DF	32	(Croatia) Fran Tudor
MF	90	(Greece) Savvas Gentsoglou
Substitutes:
GK	71	(Croatia) Davor Matijaš
FW	9	(Hungary) Márkó Futács	(yellow card) 71'	(substituted on) 70'
FW	10	(Portugal) Hugo Almeida		(substituted on) 76'
FW	15	(Croatia) Michele Šego		(substituted on) 59'
MF	26	(Croatia) Toma Bašić
DF	27	(Albania) Hysen Memolla
DF	34	(Kosovo) Ardian Ismajli
Manager:
(Croatia) Željko Kopić

Assistant referees:
Borut Križarić (Čakovec)
Dalibor Conjar (Osijek)
Fourth official:
Goran Pataki (Đakovo)
Additional assistant referees:

Match rules

- 90 minutes.
- 30 minutes of extra-time if necessary.
- Penalty shoot-out if scores still level.
- Seven named substitutes.
- Maximum of three substitutions.
