= Hysen Memolla =

Albanian footballer

Personal information
- Date of birth: 3 July 1992 (age 34)
- Place of birth: Kavajë, Albania
- Height: 1.86 m (6 ft 1 in)
- Position: Left back

Team information
- Current team: Al-Jahra

Youth career
- USD Pezze di Greco
- –2010: ASD Esperia Monopoli
- 2010–2011: Martina Franca

Senior career*
Years	Team	Apps	(Gls)
2011–2014	Martina Franca	52	(0)
2014–2016	Hellas Verona	0	(0)
2014–2015	→ Martina Franca (loan)	27	(0)
2015–2016	→ Koper (loan)	17	(2)
2016–2019	Hajduk Split	40	(0)
2019	Salernitana	4	(0)
2019	KPV	8	(3)
2020–2021	Diósgyőr	19	(0)
2022–2023	Lahti	26	(0)
2023–2024	Egnatia	22	(0)
2024	→ Chindia Târgoviște (loan)	9	(0)
2024–2025	Suhareka	29	(0)
2025–	Al-Jahra	0	(0)

International career^{‡}
2017–2021	Albania	6	(0)
- * Club domestic league appearances and goals as of 26 June 2025 ‡ National team caps and goals as of 28 March 2021

Hysen Memolla (born 3 July 1992) is an Albanian professional footballer who plays as a left back for Kuwaiti Premier League club Al-Jahra.

== Club career ==
=== Early career ===
Born in Kavajë, Albania, Memolla moved to Apulia, Italy at the age of one with his parents. He started training football in his hometown Pezze di Greco, before moving to the youth ranks of ASD Esperia in nearby Monopoli. In 2010 he moved to the academy of Martina Franca, recently promoted to Eccellenza. The following year, he joined the first-team squad, now in fifth-tier Serie D and featured in the squad that achieved another promotion, to Lega Pro Seconda Divisione. After two further seasons in the fourth-tier, Memolla signed a contract with the Serie A side Hellas Verona.

=== Hellas Verona and loans ===
Memolla wouldn't feature for the first-team however, partly due to non-EU citizenship. He was sent immediately back on loan to Martina Franca, now in third-tier Lega Pro.

His next loan would be of a higher profile as he moved on loan to the Slovenian top-tier side FC Koper. He played in 17 matches for the club, scoring twice, but did not feature after mid-March 2016.

=== Hajduk Split ===
He signed as a free agent for HNK Hajduk Split on 4 July 2016, after passing successfully a trial. Memolla made his Hajduk debut in a Round 3 Prva HNL match against RNK Split at Park Mladeži in a 0–1 win for Hajduk. His contract was prolonged for two further years after he established himself as a first-team player.

=== Salernitarna ===
Memolla did not feature in a single game in the 2018–19 season after being replaced in the starting line up by André Fomitschow and Domagoj Bradarić. He was eventually moved to Hajduk's 2nd team and placed on transfer list. On 24 January 2019, he terminated his contract with Hajduk and joined the Serie B side Salernitana.

=== KPV ===
On 12 August 2019, he moved to Finland and signed with Kokkolan Palloveikot (KPV) in Veikkausliiga.

=== Diósgyőr ===
Half year later, he signed to Hungary with Diósgyőr.

=== Lahti ===
On 21 January 2022, he returned to Finland and signed with Veikkausliiga side Lahti for the 2022 season.

=== Egnatia ===
On 15 April 2023, Memolla signed a contract extension with the club until June 2025.

== International career ==
Memolla received his first international call up at the Albania national under-21 football team by coach Skënder Gega for a 3 days testing from 7–10 May 2012.

=== Albania senior side ===
Following his good form at Hajduk Split mostly in the 2017–18 UEFA Champions League qualifying phase and play-off round, progressing through 3 rounds and qualifying for play-off, Memolla received his first call for the Albania senior team by newly appointed coach Christian Panucci for the 2018 FIFA World Cup qualification matches against Liechtenstein and Macedonia on 2 and 5 September 2017. He was an unused substitute against the former and made his debut against the later, coming on as a substitute in the 73rd minute in place of national team's captain, Ansi Agolli.

== Career statistics ==
=== Club ===
As of 21 December 2024

Club statistics
Club	Season	League			Cup		Europe (Note: Including continental competitions, such as UEFA Champions League and UEFA Europa League)		Other		Total	
Club	Season	Division	Apps	Goals	Apps	Goals	Apps	Goals	Apps	Goals	Apps	Goals
Martina Franca	2011–12	Serie D	20	0	—						20	0
Martina Franca	2012–13	Lega Pro Seconda Divisione	20	0	2	0	—				22	0
Martina Franca	2013–14	Lega Pro Seconda Divisione	12	0	2	0	—				14	0
Martina Franca (loan)	2014–15	Lega Pro	27	0	—						27	0
Total			79	0	4	0	—				83	0
Koper (loan)	2015–16	Slovenian PrvaLiga	17	2	3	0	—				20	2
Hajduk Split	2016–17	1. HNL	24	0	2	0	2	0	—		28	0
Hajduk Split	2017–18	1. HNL	13	0	1	0	6	0	—		20	0
Hajduk Split	Total		54	2	6	0	8	0	—		68	2
Salernitana	2018–19	Serie B	3	0	—				1 (Note: Appearances in Serie B relegation play-offs)	0	4	0
KPV	2019	Veikkausliiga	8	3	—				2 (Note: Appearances in Veikkausliiga relegation play-offs)	0	10	3
Diósgyőr	2019–20	NB I	5	0	—						5	0
Diósgyőr	2020–21	NB I	14	0	1	0	—				15	0
Diósgyőr	Total		30	3	1	0	—		3	0	34	3
Lahti	2022	Veikkausliiga	26	0	5	1	—		1	0	32	1
Egnatia	2022–23	Kategoria Superiore	13	0	3	0	—				16	0
Egnatia	2023–24	Kategoria Superiore	9	0	1	0	2	0	0 (Note: Appearances in Albanian Supercup)	0	12	0
Egnatia	Total		48	0	9	0	2	0	1	0	60	1
Chindia Târgoviște (loan)	2023–24	Liga II	9	0	—						9	0
Suhareka	2024–25	Kosovo Superleague	10	0	0	0	—		—		10	0
Career total			230	5	20	1	10	0	4	0	264	6

=== International ===
As of 28 March 2021

Appearances and goals by national team and year
National team	Year	Apps	Goals
Albania	2017	2	0
Albania	2018	1	0
Albania	2019	0	0
Albania	2020	2	0
Albania	2021	1	0
Total		6	0

== Honours ==
Martina Franca

- Serie D: 2011–12

Hajduk Split

- Croatian Cup runner-up: 2018–19

Egnatia

- Kategoria Superiore: 2023–24
- Albanian Cup: 2022–23, 2023–24
- Albanian Cup runner-up: 2023
