= Zvonimir Kožulj =

Bosnian footballer (born 1993)

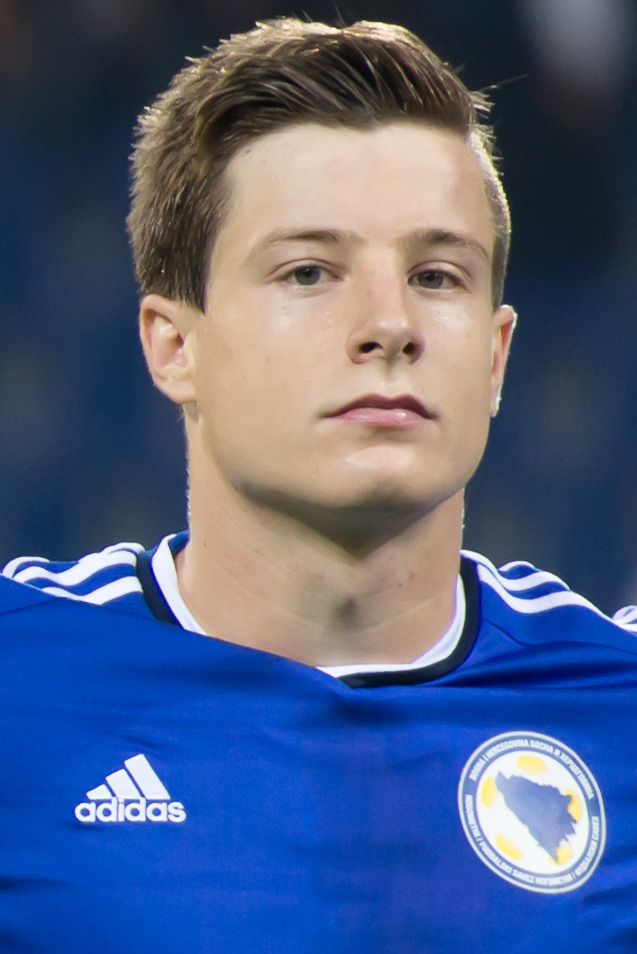
- Kožulj with Bosnia and Herzegovina U21 in 2014

Personal information
- Full name: Zvonimir Kožulj
- Date of birth: 15 November 1993 (age 32)
- Place of birth: Ljubuški, Republic of Bosnia and Herzegovina
- Height: 1.80 m (5 ft 11 in)
- Position: Midfielder

Youth career
- 2000–2011: Zrinjski Mostar
- 2011–2013: Široki Brijeg

Senior career*
Years	Team	Apps	(Gls)
2013–2016	Široki Brijeg	54	(11)
2013	→ Vitez (loan)	10	(1)
2014	→ Branitelj (loan)	12	(1)
2016–2018	Hajduk Split	49	(4)
2018–2020	Pogoń Szczecin	56	(12)
2020–2021	Gaziantep	18	(0)
2021–2022	Eyüpspor	6	(0)
2022	→ Bruk-Bet Termalica (loan)	0	(0)
2023	Sandecja Nowy Sącz	0	(0)
2023–2024	Zrinjski Mostar	4	(0)
2024	Universitatea Craiova	2	(0)
2024–2025	Široki Brijeg	8	(0)
2025	Kamen Podbablje	7	(1)
Total		226	(30)

International career
2012	Bosnia and Herzegovina U19	4	(0)
2014	Bosnia and Herzegovina U21	1	(0)
2016	Bosnia and Herzegovina	1	(0)
- * Club domestic league appearances and goals

Zvonimir Kožulj (Croatian pronunciation: [zʋǒnimiːr kǒʒuːʎ]; born 15 November 1993) is a Bosnian former professional footballer who played as a midfielder.

Kožulj started his professional career at Široki Brijeg, who loaned him to Vitez in 2013 and to Branitelj in 2014. In 2016, he joined Hajduk Split. Two years later, he was transferred to Pogoń Szczecin. After unsuccessful stints with Turkish sides Gaziantep and Eyüpspor, Kožulj signed with Bruk-Bet Termalica in 2022 but never made an appearance due to an injury picked up shortly after joining.

A former youth international for Bosnia and Herzegovina, Kožulj made his senior international debut in 2016.

== Club career ==
=== Early career ===
Kožulj came through Zrinjski Mostar's youth academy, which he left in 2011 to join Široki Brijeg. He made his professional debut against Čelik Zenica on 30 March 2013 at the age of 19.

In the summer of 2013, he was sent on a six-month loan to Vitez. On 24 August 2013, he scored his first professional goal. In January 2014, he was loaned to Branitelj until the end of season.

=== Hajduk Split ===
On 14 June 2016, Kožulj was transferred to Croatian side Hajduk Split for an undisclosed fee. He made his competitive debut for the club in UEFA Europa League qualifier against Politehnica Iași on 14 July. Three days later, on his league debut, he scored a goal in an away win over Cibalia.

=== Pogoń Szczecin ===
In June 2018, Kožulj signed a three-year contract with Polish team Pogoń Szczecin. He made his official debut for the club on 20 July against Miedź Legnica. On 19 October, Kožulj scored his first goal for Pogoń Szczecin in an away defeat to Jagiellonia. He was released from his contract in April 2020.

=== Later career ===
In August 2020, he joined the Turkish club Gaziantep FK.

In the winter of 2022, he was loaned to Polish club Bruk-Bet Termalica Nieciecza for six months with a purchase option, but he did not have a chance to debut after suffering an ACL injury during his first training session with the club. From January to April 2023, he was with Sandecja Nowy Sącz, though he did not play any matches.

On 24 June 2023, he signed with Bosnian champions Zrinjski Mostar, agreeing to a contract until 2025. He played in the group stage of the UEFA Europa Conference League and was the hero of the first-round match against AZ Alkmaar, turning the game around with two goals and an assist. A few weeks later, just before the second-leg match against Legia Warsaw, the media reported that he had been moved to the junior team. The club's coach commented that Kožulj was no longer with them, having made the personal decision not to continue with the team.

== International career ==
Having been eligible to represent both Bosnia and Herzegovina and Croatia, Kožulj opted for the former, representing it on various youth levels.

In May 2016, he received his first senior call-up for a friendly game against Spain and the 2016 Kirin Cup. Kožulj debuted against Japan on 7 June.

== Career statistics ==
=== Club ===
Appearances and goals by club, season and competition
Club	Season	League			National cup (Note: Includes Bosnian Cup, Croatian Cup, Polish Cup, Turkish Cup, Cupa României)		Continental		Total	
Club	Season	Division	Apps	Goals	Apps	Goals	Apps	Goals	Apps	Goals
Široki Brijeg	2012–13	Bosnian Premier League	6	0	2	0	0	0	8	0
Široki Brijeg	2014–15	Bosnian Premier League	26	5	7	1	2 (Note: Appearances in UEFA Europa League)	0	35	6
Široki Brijeg	2015–16	Bosnian Premier League	22	6	3	1	—		25	7
Široki Brijeg	Total		54	11	12	2	2	0	68	13
Vitez (loan)	2013–14	Bosnian Premier League	10	1	2	0	—		12	1
Branitelj (loan)	2013–14	First League of FBiH	12	1	—		—		12	1
Hajduk Split	2016–17	1. HNL	26	4	3	0	6	0	35	4
Hajduk Split	2017–18	1. HNL	23	0	2	0	5	0	30	0
Hajduk Split	Total		49	4	5	0	11	0	65	4
Pogoń Szczecin	2018–19	Ekstraklasa	34	9	1	0	—		35	9
Pogoń Szczecin	2019–20	Ekstraklasa	22	3	1	0	—		23	3
Pogoń Szczecin	Total		56	12	2	0	—		58	12
Gaziantep	2020–21	Süper Lig	18	0	2	1	—		20	1
Eyüpspor	2021–22	TFF First League	6	0	1	0	—		7	0
Bruk-Bet Termalica (loan)	2021–22	Ekstraklasa	0	0	—		—		0	0
Sandecja Nowy Sącz	2022–23	I liga	0	0	—		—		0	0
Zrinjski Mostar	2023–24	Bosnian Premier League	4	0	0	0	6 (Note: Four appearances in UEFA Champions League, two appearances and two goals in UEFA Europa Conference League)	2	10	2
Universitatea Craiova	2023–24	Liga I	2	0	1	0	—		3	0
Široki Brijeg	2024–25	Bosnian Premier League	8	0	1	0	—		9	0
Kamen Podbablje	2025–26	Treća NL	7	1	—		—		7	1
Career total			226	30	26	3	19	2	271	35

=== International ===
As of match played 7 June 2016

National team	Year	Apps	Goals
Bosnia and Herzegovina
Bosnia and Herzegovina	2016	1	0
Total		1	0

== Honours ==
Široki Brijeg

- Bosnian Cup: 2012–13

Hajduk Split

- Croatian Cup runner-up: 2017–18

Individual

- Ekstraklasa Player of the Month: May 2019, July 2019
