= Robert Jandrek =

Croatian footballer

Personal information
- Date of birth: 30 August 1995 (age 31)
- Place of birth: Sinj, Croatia
- Height: 1.83 m (6 ft 0 in)
- Position: Right winger

Team information
- Current team: Posušje
- Number: 47

Youth career
- 2002–2006: Junak Sinj
- 2006–2007: Omladinac Vranjic
- 2007–2009: Hajduk Split
- 2009–2010: Glavice
- 2010–2013: Junak Sinj
- 2013–2014: Lokomotiva Zagreb

Senior career*
Years	Team	Apps	(Gls)
2014–2015	Junak Sinj	43	(5)
2016–2018	Hajduk Split	9	(0)
2016–2017	→ Hajduk II	44	(18)
2018	→ Dugopolje (loan)	8	(1)
2018–2019	Junak Sinj		
2019	Krško	16	(0)
2019–2020	Junak Sinj		
2020	Ilzer SV	0	(0)
2020–2022	Junak Sinj	32	(8)
2022–2023	NK Hrvace		
2023–	Posušje	3	(0)
- * Club domestic league appearances and goals as of 5 October 2023

Robert Jandrek (Croatian pronunciation: [rǒbert jǎndrek]; born 30 August 1995) is a Croatian footballer who plays as a right winger for Posušje.

== Club career ==
Born in Sinj, Croatia, Jandrek started his hometown club NK Junak Sinj at the age of 7, before moving on to NK Omladinac Vranjic, before spending two seasons at the regional powerhouse HNK Hajduk Split's academy. Though a right winger, he played at his own initiative at right-back in a generation with the likes of Mario Pašalić, Tonći Mujan and others. Not breaking through, Jandrek returned to the Sinj region, first to NK Glavice, and then back to Junak. Jandrek spent his last U19 season at NK Lokomotiva in Zagreb, where he was moved from the wing to the center of the pitch, but returned to NK Junak Sinj and his old playing position in the summer of 2014.

Jandrek made a strong impact at the third-tier club, quickly securing a first-team place, accumulating 26 caps and 1 goal in his first senior season. He picked up the pace the following fall, drawing interest from HNK Hajduk Split again. Hajduk moved fast and, in November 2015, settled his transfer. Jandrek joined the club at the beginning of 2016, becoming a firm fixture in the reserve team (third-tier at the time). Jandrek picked up his form, scoring 6 goals in 15 matches from the wing, playing well enough that Joan Carrillo not calling him up for the first-team preparations created controversy among the followers of the club. Jandrek, however, was not forgotten by the first team manager, and made his Prva HNL debut on March 31, 2017, in the 1–3 away win against Inter Zaprešić, coming on in the 89th minute for Said Ahmed Said. Hajduk's reserve squad achieved promotion to Druga HNL at the end of the season, Jandrek having contributed with 12 goals in 26 matches in total.

In August 2019, Jandrek returned to NK Junak Sinj. Jandrek moved to Austrian club Ilzer SV in February 2020. However, due to the COVID-19 pandemic, no official games was played during his time at the club, so he left the club again in the summer 2020, after playing a few friendly games. He then returned to Junak Sinj once again.
