= Hrvoje Plum =

Croatian footballer

Personal information
- Date of birth: 28 May 1994 (age 32)
- Place of birth: Vinkovci, Croatia
- Height: 1.79 m (5 ft 10 in)
- Position: Midfielder

Youth career
- –2011: Osijek
- –2013: Dinamo Zagreb

Senior career*
Years	Team	Apps	(Gls)
2013	Dinamo Zagreb	0	(0)
2013	→ Sesvete (loan)	14	(1)
2013–2014	Lokomotiva	9	(0)
2015–2016	Cibalia	28	(0)
2016–2017	Dugopolje	28	(3)
2017–2018	Cibalia	30	(1)
2018–2019	Osijek II	12	(2)
2019–2023	Glentoran	108	(16)

International career
2010	Croatia U16	3	(0)
2010–2011	Croatia U17	4	(0)
2012–2013	Croatia U19	3	(0)
- * Club domestic league appearances and goals as of 15 May 2023

Hrvoje Plum (born 28 May 1994) is a Croatian footballer who plays as a midfielder and is currently a free agent.

== Career ==
Plum started his senior career with Osijek. In 2013, he signed for Lokomotiva in the Croatian First Football League, where he made nine appearances and scored zero goals. After that, he played for Croatian clubs Cibalia and Dugopolje.

On 6 July 2019, Plum signed for NIFL Premiership side Glentoran and further extended his contract with the club for another year in January 2020.
