= Josip Radošević =

Croatian footballer (born 1994)

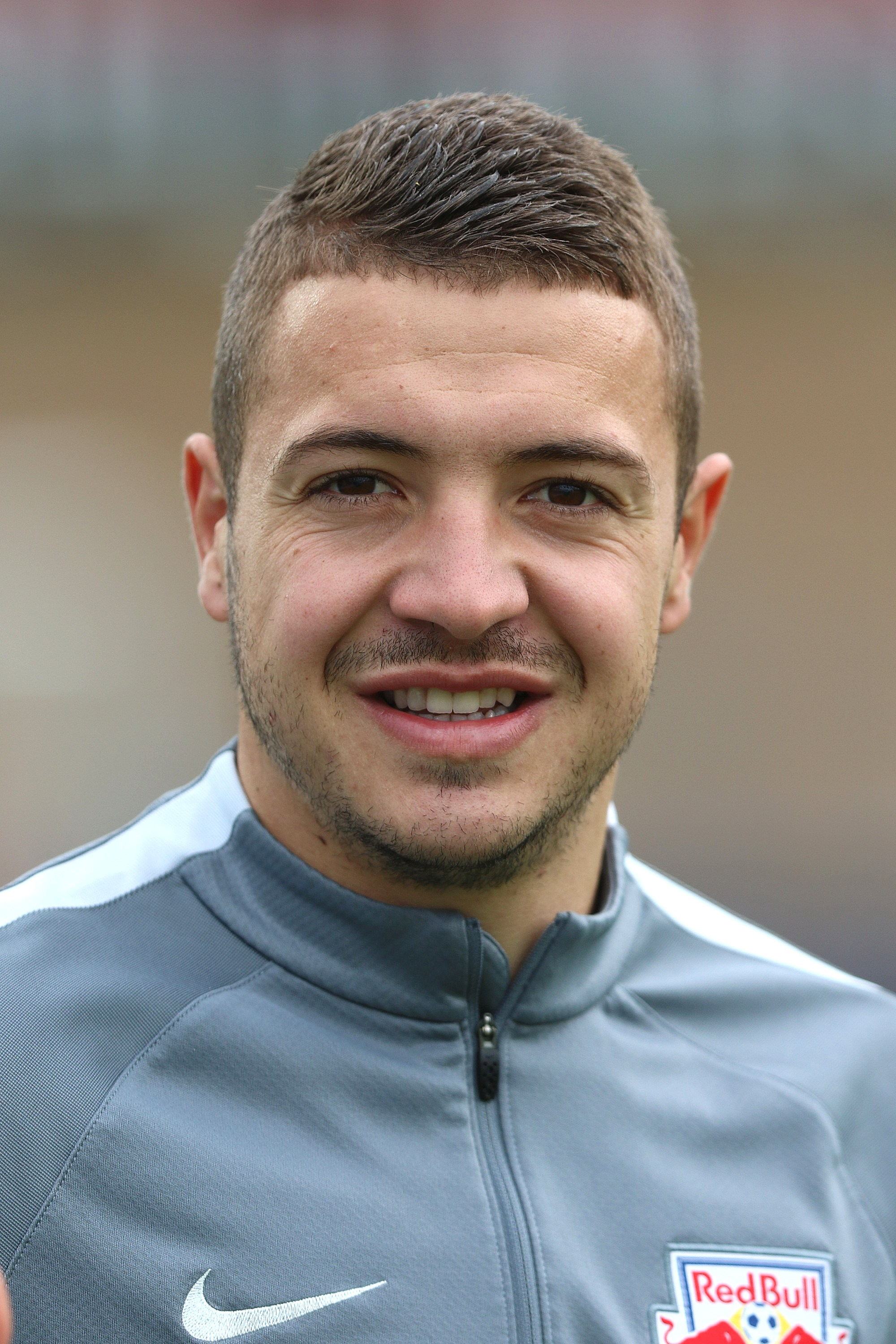
- Radošević with Red Bull Salzburg in 2017

Personal information
- Date of birth: 3 April 1994 (age 32)
- Place of birth: Split, Croatia
- Height: 1.80 m (5 ft 11 in)
- Position: Defensive midfielder

Team information
- Current team: Istra 1961

Youth career
- 2005–2012: Hajduk Split

Senior career*
Years	Team	Apps	(Gls)
2011–2013	Hajduk Split	24	(0)
2013–2016	Napoli	9	(0)
2015–2016	→ Rijeka (loan)	32	(2)
2016	→ Eibar (loan)	8	(0)
2016–2017	Red Bull Salzburg	20	(3)
2017–2018	Hajduk Split	35	(3)
2018–2025	Brøndby	187	(9)
2025–	Istra 1961	47	(1)

International career
2010	Croatia U16	4	(2)
2010–2011	Croatia U17	16	(0)
2011–2012	Croatia U19	6	(0)
2013	Croatia U20	2	(0)
2013–2016	Croatia U21	16	(4)
2012	Croatia	1	(0)
- * Club domestic league appearances and goals as of 07:41, 8 September 2026 (UTC)

Josip Radošević (Croatian pronunciation: [jǒsip radǒːʃeʋitɕ]; born 3 April 1994) is a Croatian professional footballer who plays as a defensive midfielder for Croatian Football League club Istra 1961.

A product of the Hajduk Split academy, Radošević made his first-team debut at 17 and became a regular in midfield before joining Napoli in 2013. He played rarely in Italy and spent time on loan at Rijeka and Eibar. He won the Austrian league and cup double with Red Bull Salzburg in 2016–17, then spent a season back at Hajduk. In 2018 he joined Brøndby, where he won the 2020–21 Danish Superliga and became the foreign player with the most appearances in the club's history. He returned to Croatia with Istra in 2025.

Radošević won one cap for Croatia, starting a 2014 FIFA World Cup qualifier against Belgium in September 2012 at the age of 18.

== Club career ==
=== Hajduk Split ===
Radošević came through the youth academy of his hometown club, Hajduk Split. He was promoted to the senior squad in November 2011. On 23 November 2011, aged 17, he made his first-team debut in a 1–0 win over NK Zagreb in the quarter-finals of the 2011–12 Croatian Cup. He started seven league matches that season.

In the 2012–13 season, Radošević became a regular in defensive midfield and made 17 league appearances before the winter break. The Croatian press nicknamed him "Hajduk's Gattuso". After his departure in January 2013, head coach Mišo Krstičević described him as one of the pillars of the team and said he would be missed.

=== Napoli ===
On 29 January 2013, Radošević joined Serie A club Napoli on loan with an obligation to buy. He made his debut on 25 August 2013, the opening day of the 2013–14 season, replacing Gonzalo Higuaín in the 84th minute of a 3–0 home win over Bologna. He made nine appearances that season, including a start against Atalanta in the Coppa Italia. He was part of the squad that won the Coppa Italia that season.

In the summer of 2014, Cesena and Bari tried to take Radošević on loan, but head coach Rafael Benítez kept him as a fourth-choice central midfielder. He did not play a minute in the first six league matches of the 2014–15 season. He made ten appearances in total for Napoli.

==== Rijeka (loan) ====
On 4 February 2015, Radošević joined Rijeka on loan until 31 December 2015. He scored his first goal for the club on 4 April 2015, an equaliser in the fourth minute of stoppage time in a 2–2 draw with Dinamo Zagreb. He made 32 league appearances for Rijeka and scored twice.

==== Eibar (loan) ====
On 31 January 2016, Radošević joined La Liga club Eibar on loan until the end of the season, with an option to buy. Head coach José Luis Mendilibar had asked for a holding midfielder after an injury to Gonzalo Escalante. Radošević struggled at first to adapt to Mendilibar's style of play and to the language. He made eight appearances and started several matches late in the season. He returned to Napoli for pre-season training in the summer of 2016.

=== Red Bull Salzburg ===
On 31 August 2016, the final day of the transfer window, Radošević joined Austrian club Red Bull Salzburg on a free transfer. He initially signed a contract until the end of the season. Salzburg director Christoph Freund described him as an aggressive defensive midfielder who was strong in the tackle. He made 28 appearances in his only season at the club and scored three league goals. Salzburg won a fourth successive Austrian Bundesliga title. They completed the double by beating Rapid Wien 2–1 in the Austrian Cup final on 1 June 2017.

=== Return to Hajduk Split ===
In June 2017, Radošević returned to Hajduk Split as a free agent. On signing, he said it felt as if he had never left. He became the team's vice-captain and occasionally wore the captain's armband.

Hajduk eliminated Brøndby in the third qualifying round of the 2017–18 UEFA Europa League, drawing 0–0 in Denmark and winning 2–0 at the Poljud. In the play-off round against Everton, Radošević opened the scoring at the Poljud with a shot from 30 metres in the 43rd minute. The match ended 1–1 and Everton went through on aggregate. Hajduk challenged Dinamo Zagreb for the league title until the final month of the season. His last match for the club was the 2018 Croatian Cup final, which Hajduk lost to Dinamo in Vinkovci. He made 45 appearances and scored four goals in his second spell at Hajduk.

=== Brøndby ===
On 27 July 2018, Radošević joined Danish Superliga club Brøndby on a four-year contract for a fee of €800,000. Brøndby had first noticed him in the 2017 Europa League qualifiers. The transfer was completed within two or three days, while he was in Hajduk's squad for a Europa League qualifier against Slavia Sofia. Brøndby signed him to replace Christian Nørgaard, a fan favourite who had joined Fiorentina, in defensive midfield.

Radošević made his debut on 5 August 2018 in a 2–0 home win over Nordsjælland. He scored his first goal for the club in a 3–3 draw away to Nordsjælland on 10 February 2019.

Niels Frederiksen took over as head coach in the summer of 2019, and Radošević kept his place in defensive midfield. He scored in a 4–2 home win over Nordsjælland on 15 September 2019. On 27 October 2019, he injured his shoulder in a 5–2 win over Randers. The injury required surgery and kept him out for a long spell.

Radošević won back a regular starting place in the first half of the 2020–21 season. Brøndby went on to win the Danish Superliga, their first league title since 2005.

Radošević tested positive for COVID-19 amid an outbreak in the Brøndby first team on 6 August 2021. He missed the derby against Copenhagen and the first leg of the UEFA Champions League play-off against his former club Red Bull Salzburg. On 20 August 2021, he signed a four-year contract extension running until June 2025.

On 3 September 2023, Radošević played his 147th Superliga game for Brøndby, surpassing Johan Larsson as the non-Dane with the most league appearances for the club.

In January 2025, with six months left on his contract, Radošević did not travel with Brøndby to their winter training camp in Portugal. Brøndby had wanted to keep him, but he wished to return to Croatia for family reasons. The club agreed to release him, and Radošević gave up part of his bonuses to make the move possible. He left Brøndby after 226 appearances, the most by a foreign player in the club's history.

=== Istra 1961 ===
On 30 January 2025, Radošević signed for Istra 1961 on a contract until June 2027. It was his first spell in the Croatian top flight for seven years. Istra director Saša Bjelanović said Radošević had chosen the club despite more lucrative offers from other clubs. He quickly became one of the key players in Gonzalo García's side.

By the 2025–26 season, Radošević was Istra's captain. On 20 March 2026, he won the ball in midfield, carried it forward and scored from around 20 metres to give Istra a 2–1 home win over Varaždin.

In June 2026, Istra's Basque owners cut the club's budget and appointed Javier Cabello as head coach. Cabello decided that Radošević did not suit his style of play. The club told Radošević and his representatives that ending his contract by mutual consent would be best for both sides. Bjelanović confirmed that Radošević would leave the club. He was left out of the 34-man squad for pre-season training.

Radošević did not find a new club over the summer. At the end of August, the club ordered him back to training, where he would work separately from the first team, with his contract expiring in June 2027.

== International career ==
Radošević was a part of the Croatian national under-17 team in the qualifications for the 2011 UEFA European Under-17 Football Championship, playing in all six group games. Although Croatia ended qualifications undefeated, in the elite round they finished runners-up in the group behind hosts Netherlands and failed to qualify. Overall, he gathered 35 appearances for the youth teams, scoring two goals. In August 2012, Radošević was called up to the national team by manager Igor Štimac for the 2014 FIFA World Cup qualification matches against Macedonia and Belgium as an alternative for the defensive midfielder Ognjen Vukojević. On 11 September 2012, Radošević made his full debut for the national side in a 1–1 draw against Belgium, making him the youngest player to debut in the history of the national team.

== Career statistics ==
=== Club ===
As of match played 23 May 2026

Appearances and goals by club, season and competition
Club	Season	League	League		National cup (Note: Includes Croatian Football Cup, Coppa Italia, Austrian Cup, Danish Cup)		Europe		Total	
Club	Season	League	Apps	Goals	Apps	Goals	Apps	Goals	Apps	Goals
Hajduk Split	2011–12	1. HNL	7	0	2	0	—		9	0
Hajduk Split	2012–13	1. HNL	17	0	3	0	4 (Note: Appearances in the UEFA Europa League)	0	24	0
Hajduk Split	Total		24	0	5	0	4	0	33	0
Napoli	2013–14	Serie A	8	0	1	0	—		9	0
Rijeka (loan)	2014–15	1. HNL	16	1	4	0	—		20	1
Rijeka (loan)	2015–16	1. HNL	16	1	2	0	2	0	20	1
Rijeka (loan)	Total		32	2	6	0	2	0	40	2
Eibar (loan)	2015–16	La Liga	8	0	—				8	0
Red Bull Salzburg	2016–17	Austrian Bundesliga	20	3	3	1	5	1	28	5
Hajduk Split	2017–18	1. HNL	35	3	5	0	5	1	45	1
Brøndby IF	2018–19	Danish Superliga	30	2	3	0	4	0	37	2
Brøndby IF	2019–20	Danish Superliga	27	1	1	0	6	0	36	1
Brøndby IF	2020–21	Danish Superliga	31	0	2	0	—		33	1
Brøndby IF	2021–22	Danish Superliga	26	1	2	0	7 (Note: One appearance in UEFA Champions League, six appearances in UEFA Europa League)	0	35	1
Brøndby IF	2022–23	Danish Superliga	27	3	0	0	4 (Note: Appearances in the UEFA Conference League)	0	31	3
Brøndby IF	2023–24	Danish Superliga	31	2	4	0	—		35	2
Brøndby IF	2024–25	Danish Superliga	15	0	2	0	4	0	21	0
Brøndby IF	Total		187	9	14	0	25	0	226	9
Istra	2024–25	Croatian Football League	15	0	2	0	—		17	0
Istra	2025–26	Croatian Football League	32	1	1	0	—		33	1
Istra	Total		47	1	3	0	—		50	1
Career total			361	18	37	1	41	2	439	21

== Honours ==
Napoli

- Coppa Italia: 2013–14
- Supercoppa Italiana: 2014

Red Bull Salzburg

- Austrian Bundesliga: 2016–17
- Austrian Cup: 2016–17

Brøndby

- Danish Superliga: 2020–21
