= Gustavo Carbonieri =

Brazilian footballer (born 1992)

Personal information
- Full name: Gustavo Carbonieri Santa Rosa
- Date of birth: 4 March 1992 (age 34)
- Place of birth: São Paulo, Brazil
- Height: 1.90 m (6 ft 3 in)
- Position: Centre-back

Team information
- Current team: Rio Branco Atlético Clube
- Number: 3

Youth career
- –2011: Ponte Preta

Senior career*
Years	Team	Apps	(Gls)
2011–2013	Tombense	0	(0)
2011	→ Salgueiro (loan)	6	(1)
2012	→ Rio Branco (loan)	4	(0)
2013–2014	Central	14	(2)
2014	Penapolense	1	(0)
2014	Bragantino	19	(1)
2014–2016	Tombense	1	(0)
2015–2016	→ Santa Clara (loan)	23	(0)
2016–2017	Rio Preto	14	(0)
2017–2018	Hajduk Split	6	(0)
2019	Atibaia	0	(0)
2019–2021	Tsarsko Selo	15	(1)
2021	Trepça'89	7	(0)
2021–2022	Al-Yarmouk	0	(0)
2022–	Casale	3	(0)
- * Club domestic league appearances and goals as of 27 February 2021

Gustavo Carbonieri Santa Rosa (born 4 March 1992) is a Brazilian professional footballer who plays as a centre-back for Brazilian club Rio Branco Atlético Clube.

== Club career ==
Born in São Paulo, Carbonieri started his career with Série B team Salgueiro in 2011. After playing for a number of clubs in the lower divisions of Brazilian football, he returned to the second tier in 2014 with Bragantino. He scored his only goal for the club in a Copa do Brasil match against São Paulo.

In 2015, Carbonieri moved to Tombense in search of more first team opportunities. However he was loaned out to Portuguese club Santa Clara of the Segunda Liga where he managed to make 27 appearances. In June 2017, he joined Croatian club Hajduk Split on trial. During his trial, he played the whole 90 minute of a friendly against Zorya Luhansk. On 7 July, the club via a statement published in their website announced that they had signed Carbonieri. In September, he was successfully operated as he suffered a ventricular rupture and dislocation of left ankle. In May 2018 his contract was terminated with mutual consent.
