= Tongo Doumbia =

Malian footballer (born 1989)

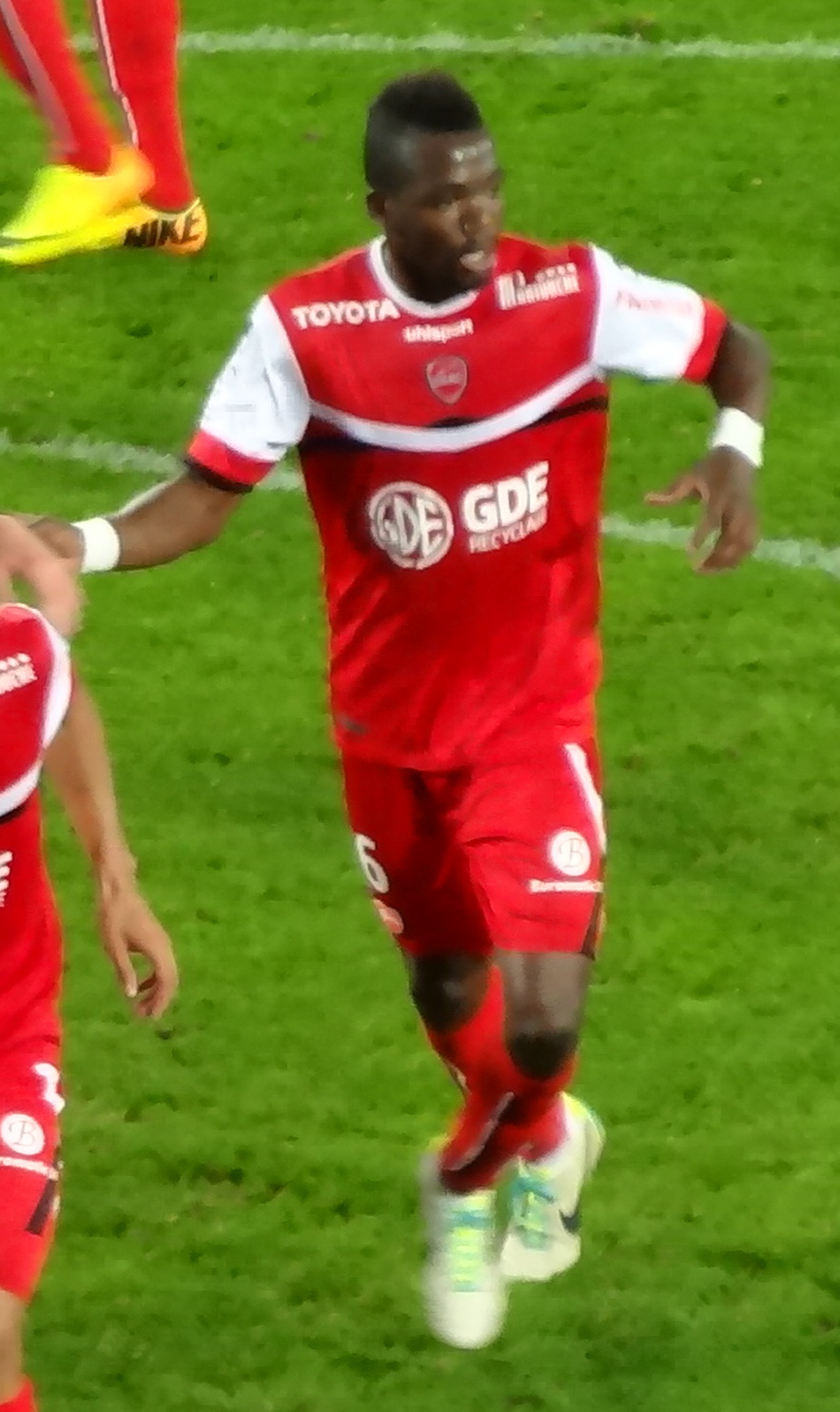
- Doumbia playing for Valenciennes in 2013

Personal information
- Full name: Tongo Hamed Doumbia
- Date of birth: 6 August 1989 (age 37)
- Place of birth: Vernon, Eure, France
- Height: 1.91 m (6 ft 3 in)
- Position: Midfielder

Team information
- Current team: TFC

Youth career
- 1999–2000: Olympique Noisy-le-Sec
- 2000–2001: JS Noisy-le-Sec
- 2001–2002: Olympique Noisy-le-Sec
- 2002–2005: FC Les Lilas
- 2006–2007: RSC Montreuil

Senior career*
Years	Team	Apps	(Gls)
2007–2008	Châteauroux B	17	(12)
2008–2009	Châteauroux	1	(0)
2009–2012	Rennes	53	(2)
2012	→ Wolverhampton Wanderers (loan)	16	(2)
2012–2014	Wolverhampton Wanderers	17	(0)
2013–2014	→ Valenciennes (loan)	36	(4)
2014–2017	Toulouse	59	(4)
2017–2018	Dinamo Zagreb	29	(1)
2018-2019	Al Ain	10	(1)
2019-2021	Ajman	14	(0)
2021–2022	Aktobe	19	(0)
2022–2023	Western United	20	(2)
2023	Tuwaiq	1	(0)
2025–	TFC		

International career^{‡}
2008–2010	Mali U–21	19	(1)
2012–	Mali	20	(0)
- * Club domestic league appearances and goals as of 2 May 2023 ‡ National team caps and goals as of 17 June 2019

Tongo Hamed Doumbia (born 6 August 1989) is a Malian professional footballer who plays as a midfielder for Emirati club TFC. He has previously played for the Mali national team.

== Club career ==
=== French football ===
Doumbia played youth football with Olympique Noisy-le-Sec, JS Noisy-le-Sec, FC Les Lilas and RSC Montreuil. Aged 17 he signed a contract with Ligue 2 club LB Châteauroux in summer 2007. He played for their reserve team of Châteauroux in the French Fifth Division, playing just one first team game for the club; on 20 February 2009 against Guingamp.

After two years with Châteauroux Doumbia left to sign for Rennes on 19 June 2009. He made his debut for team in the Coupe de la Ligue against FC Sochaux on 23 September 2009. During the 2010–11 and 2011–12 seasons he became a more regular player in the Rennes line-up, making a total of 59 appearances for the club to date.

=== Wolves ===
On 30 July 2012, Doumbia initially joined English side Wolverhampton Wanderers on a planned season-long loan deal, with view to a permanent move. On 13 November 2012, Wolves announced that Doumbia had signed a permanent contract to keep him at the club until summer 2016. He made 35 appearances in total during the season as the club ended up becoming relegated to League One.

After this relegation, new Wolves manager Kenny Jackett stated that Doumbia was not likely to feature in his plans for the new season. On 6 August 2013 he left Wolves to join Ligue 1 club Valenciennes on a season-long loan, where he became a regular player but could not help them avoid relegation.

=== Toulouse ===
On 29 August 2014, Doumbia signed for Ligue 1 club Toulouse for an undisclosed fee.

=== Al Ain FC ===
Doumbia signed for Al Ain FC in Abu Dhabi on 5 October 2018.

=== Aktobe ===
On 18 February 2021, Doumbia signed for Kazakhstan Premier League club FC Aktobe.

=== Western United ===
On 24 August 2022, Doumbia signed for Australian club Western United, ahead of the 2022-23 A-League season. Doumbia spent one season at Western United, before being released by the club.

=== Tuwaiq ===
On 29 August 2023, Doumbia joined Saudi Second Division side Tuwaiq.

== International career ==
He made his debut for the Mali national football team on 27 May 2012 in a friendly against Ivory Coast, The game ended with an Ivorian 2–1 victory.

He competed in the 2015 Africa Cup of Nations and played in group stage matches with Cameroon and Ivory Coast. But Mali did not make it to the playoffs.
