= Said Ahmed Said =

Italian footballer (born 1993)

Ahmed Said
Personal information
- Full name: Said Ahmed Said
- Date of birth: 20 April 1993 (age 33)
- Place of birth: Kumasi, Ghana
- Height: 1.84 m (6 ft 0 in)
- Position: Striker

Youth career
- 2004–2011: Inter Milan
- 2010–2011: → Chievo (loan)
- 2011–2013: Genoa

Senior career*
Years	Team	Apps	(Gls)
2012–2016	Genoa	5	(1)
2014	→ Monza (loan)	10	(0)
2014–2015	→ Mantova (loan)	34	(5)
2015–2016	→ Olhanense (loan)	36	(8)
2016–2019	Hajduk Split	67	(21)
2019–2021	Rio Ave	4	(1)
2019–2020	→ Lokeren (loan)	14	(0)
2021–2022	Argeș Pitești	26	(3)
2022–2023	Panserraikos	21	(8)
2024–2025	Sloboda Tuzla	15	(4)
2025–2026	Unirea Slobozia	24	(1)

International career
2012	Italy U19	1	(0)
- * Club domestic league appearances and goals as of 18 May 2026

Said Ahmed Said (born 20 April 1993) is a professional footballer who plays as a striker. Born in Ghana, he has represented Italy at youth level.

== Career ==
=== Internazionale ===
Born in Ghana, Said moved to Italy at a young age. He was a product of Inter Milan's youth system. He scored 14 goals for the under-17 team in the 2009–10 season and was also the second-highest goalscorer, behind teammate Fabio Hoxha. On 31 August 2010 Said departed Inter on loan for ChievoVerona's Primavera team, however he only featured 9 times.

=== Genoa ===
In August 2011 Said transferred to Genoa. He made his Serie A debut on 1 November 2012, against ACF Fiorentina.

On 2 January 2014 Said was loaned to Monza. He was farmed out to Mantova in Summer 2014.

=== Olhanense ===
On 31 August 2015, Said was signed by Olhanense on a temporary deal. Said scored 8 goals in 36 matches at Olhanense in the LigaPro.

=== Hajduk Split ===
On 5 July 2016, Said was signed by HNK Hajduk Split. Said made his Hajduk debut on 14 July 2016 in a 2–2 draw against Politehnica Iași at the Emil Alexandrescu Stadium in Romania in the Second Round of the 2016–17 UEFA Europa League qualifying. Said came on as a substitute in the 68th minute and scored the equalising goal in the 94th minute. Said made his 1. HNL debut on 17 July 2016, playing 60 minutes before coming off for Zvonimir Kožulj in a 2–0 win over HNK Cibalia. On 24 August 2017, he missed a penalty against Everton in a Europa League Qualifier. On 19 August 2018, in the 90th minute of Hajduk's home loss against Gorica, he received a red card and a 4-match suspension after headbutting Gorica's goalkeeper Kristijan Kahlina.

=== Rio Ave ===
On 31 January 2019, Said was signed by Rio Ave. After four caps in 2019, the forward was loaned on to Lokeren in Belgium for one year.

== Honours ==
Hajduk Split

- Croatian Cup runner-up: 2017–18

Panserraikos

- Super League Greece 2: 2022–23
