= 2017–18 Croatian Football Cup =

Tournament details
- Country: Croatia
- Teams: 48

Final positions
- Champions: Dinamo Zagreb
- Runners-up: Hajduk Split

Tournament statistics
- Matches played: 47
- Goals scored: 193 (4.11 per match)
- Top goal scorer: Mirko Marić (4)

The 2017–18 Croatian Football Cup was the twenty-seventh season of Croatia's football knockout competition. The defending champions were Rijeka, having won their fourth title the previous year by defeating Dinamo Zagreb in the final.

== Calendar ==
Round	Date(s)	Number of fixtures	Clubs	New entries this round	Goals / games
Preliminary round	23 August 2017	16	48 → 32	32	89 / 16
First round	20 September 2017	16	32 → 16	16	63 / 16
Second round	25 October 2017	8	16 → 8	none	19 / 8
Quarter-finals	29 November 2017	4	8 → 4	none	16 / 4
Semi-finals	28 February 2018	2	4 → 2	none	5 / 2
Final	23 May 2018	1	2 → 1	none	1 / 1

== Participating clubs ==
The following 48 teams qualified for the competition:

Best clubs by cup coefficient 16 clubs	Winners and runners up of county cups 32 clubs
Cibalia; Dinamo Zagreb; GOŠK Dubrovnik 1919; Hajduk Split; Inter Zaprešić; Istra 1961; Lokomotiva; Osijek; Rijeka; Slaven Belupo; RNK Split; Šibenik; Vinogradar; Zadar; NK Zagreb; Zelina	Osijek-Baranja County cup winner: Đakovo Croatia; Osijek-Baranja County cup runner up: FEŠK Feričanci; Zagreb County cup winner: Gorica; Zagreb County cup runner up: Vrbovec; Brod-Posavina County cup winner: Batrina; Brod-Posavina County cup runner up: Oriolik; Vukovar-Srijem County cup winner: Bedem Ivankovo; Vukovar-Srijem County cup runner up: Fruškogorac Ilok; Međimurje County cup winner: Međimurje; Međimurje County cup runner up: Nedelišće; City of Zagreb cup winner: Rudeš; City of Zagreb cup runner up: Sesvete; Koprivnica-Križevci County cup winner: Borac Imbriovec; Koprivnica-Križevci County cup runner up: Križevci; Istria County cup winner: Novigrad; Istria County cup runner up: Mladost Fažana; Sisak-Moslavina County cup winner: Lekenik; Sisak-Moslavina County cup runner up: Moslavina; Varaždin County cup winner: Varaždin; Varaždin County cup runner up: Nedeljanec; Bjelovar-Bilogora County cup winner: Bjelovar; Bjelovar-Bilogora County cup runner up: Garić Garešnica; Virovitica-Podravina County cup winner: Virovitica; Split-Dalmatia County cup winner: Croatia Zmijavci; Primorje-Gorski Kotar County cup winner: Crikvenica; Požega-Slavonia County cup winner: Slavonija Požega; Dubrovnik-Neretva County cup winner: Zmaj Blato; Karlovac County cup winner: Karlovac 1919; Zadar County cup winner: Dragovoljac Poličnik; Krapina-Zagorje County cup winner: Straža Hum na Sutli; Šibenik-Knin County cup winner: Zagora Unešić; Lika-Senj County cup winner: Nehaj Senj

== Preliminary round ==
The draw for the preliminary single-legged round was held on 20 July 2017 in Zagreb. The matches were played on 23 August 2017.

Tie no	Home team	Score	Away team
1^{*}	Zagora Unešić	4–2	Nedeljanec
2	Fruškogorac Ilok	0–10	Varaždin
3^{*}	Virovitica	3–3 (6–7 p)	Vrbovec
4	Križevci	2–4 (a.e.t.)	Đakovo Croatia
5	Straža Hum na Sutli	1–3 (a.e.t.)	Nedelišće
6^{**}	Garić Garešnica	0–5	Sesvete
7	Bedem Ivankovo	4–1 (a.e.t.)	Međimurje
8^{*}	Lekenik	0–6	Oriolik
9^{**}	Gorica	8–0	Moslavina
10	Rudeš	2–0	Dragovoljac Poličnik
11	Nehaj Senj	3–2 (a.e.t.)	Batrina
12	Borac Imbriovec	4–3 (a.e.t.)	Karlovac 1919
13^{*}	Croatia Zmijavci	7–1	FEŠK Feričanci
14	Crikvenica	2–3 (a.e.t.)	Bjelovar
15	Slavonija Požega	2–1	Mladost Fažana
16^{**}	Novigrad	3–0	Zmaj Blato

* Matches played on 19 August.
** Matches played on 22 August.

== First round ==
The first round was played on 20 September 2017.

Tie no	Home team	Score	Away team
1	Borac Imbriovec	0–6	Dinamo Zagreb
2	Vrbovec	1–3	Rijeka
3	Oriolik	0–3	Hajduk Split
4	Croatia Zmijavci	0–1	Slaven Belupo
5	Bedem Ivankovo	0–3	Lokomotiva
6	Sesvete	3–0	RNK Split
7	Nehaj Senj	0–6	Osijek
8	Đakovo Croatia	0–4	Istra 1961
9^{***}	Varaždin	1–2	Cibalia
10^{*}	Slavonija Požega	1–2	Zadar
11	Nedelišće	0–6	Inter Zaprešić
12	Bjelovar	2–3	NK Zagreb
13^{**}	Rudeš	2–2 (4–2 p)	Vinogradar
14	Zagora Unešić	0–3	Šibenik
15^{**}	Gorica	3–0	GOŠK Dubrovnik 1919
16	Novigrad	5–1	Zelina

* Match played on 19 September.
** Matches played on 4 October.
*** Match played on 18 October.

== Second round ==
The second round was played on 25 October 2017.

Tie no	Home team	Score	Away team
1^{**}	Novigrad	0–0 (2–3 p)	Dinamo Zagreb
2^{****}	Gorica	0–3	Rijeka
3	Šibenik	0–1	Hajduk Split
4^{*}	Rudeš	2–0 (a.e.t.)	Slaven Belupo
5	NK Zagreb	0–1	Lokomotiva
6	Inter Zaprešić	2–1 (a.e.t.)	Sesvete
7	Zadar	0–4	Osijek
8^{***}	Cibalia	2–3	Istra 1961

* Match played on 24 October.
** Match played on 31 October.
*** Match played on 7 November.
**** Match played on 14 November.

== Quarter-finals ==
The quarter-final was played on 29 November 2017.

Tie no	Home team	Score	Away team
1	Dinamo Zagreb	4−2	Istra 1961
2^{*}	Rudeš	1−2	Lokomotiva
3^{**}	Inter Zaprešić	1−2	Rijeka
4	Osijek	1−3	Hajduk Split

* Match played on 30 November.
** Match played on 13 December at Stadion Rujevica in Rijeka due to inadequate pitch condition at ŠRC Zaprešić.

== Semi-finals ==
The semi-final was originally scheduled for 28 February 2018 but was later postponed due to unfavourable weather conditions.

13 March 2018
17:30

Lokomotiva	1−1 (a.e.t.)	Hajduk Split
Majstorović 55'	Report	Barry 58'
Penalties
Majer (penalty missed); Ivanušec (penalty scored); Musa (penalty missed); Havojić (penalty scored)	2–4	(penalty scored) Caktaš; (penalty scored) Said; (penalty missed) Bašić; (penalty scored) Filip; (penalty scored) Radošević

Stadion Kranjčevićeva, Zagreb
Attendance: 2,480
Referee: Ivan Bebek (Rijeka)

4 April 2018
17:00

Dinamo Zagreb	3−0	Rijeka
Hajrović 24'; Soudani 80'; Ćorić 82'	Report

Stadion Maksimir, Zagreb
Attendance: 6,037
Referee: Mario Zebec (Cestica)

== Final ==
The final was played on 23 May 2018 at Stadion HNK Cibalia in Vinkovci.

23 May 2018
19:00

Dinamo Zagreb	1−0	Hajduk Split
Gavranović 55'	Report

Stadion HNK Cibalia, Vinkovci
Attendance: 8,208
Referee: Mario Zebec (Cestica)

== Bracket ==
Second round 24 October–14 November 2017
Novigrad	0 (2)
Dinamo Zagreb	0 (3 p)
Cibalia	2
Istra 1961	3
Inter Zaprešić	2 (a.e.t.)
Sesvete	1
Gorica	0
Rijeka	3
Rudeš	2 (a.e.t.)
Slaven Belupo	0
NK Zagreb	0
Lokomotiva	1
Zadar	0
Osijek	4
Šibenik	0
Hajduk Split	1

Quarter-finals; 29 November–13 December 2017
Dinamo Zagreb	4
Istra 1961	2
Inter Zaprešić	1
Rijeka	2
Rudeš	1
Lokomotiva	2
Osijek	1
Hajduk Split	3

Semi-finals; 13 March–4 April 2018
Dinamo Zagreb	3
Rijeka	0
Lokomotiva	1 (2)
Hajduk Split	1 (4 p)

Final; 23 May 2018
Dinamo Zagreb	1
Hajduk Split	0

== Top scorers ==
Rank	Player	Club(s)	Goals
1	(Croatia) Mirko Marić	Osijek	4
2	(Switzerland) Mario Gavranović	Dinamo	3
2	(Chile) Ángelo Henríquez	Dinamo	3
2	(Croatia) Josip Kozić	Bjelovar	3
2	(Croatia) Lovro Majer	Lokomotiva	3
2	(Croatia) Luka Nakić	Gorica	3
2	(Croatia) Antonio Samac	Novigrad	3
2	(Croatia) Antonio Štimac	Sesvete	3
