= André Fomitschow =

German footballer

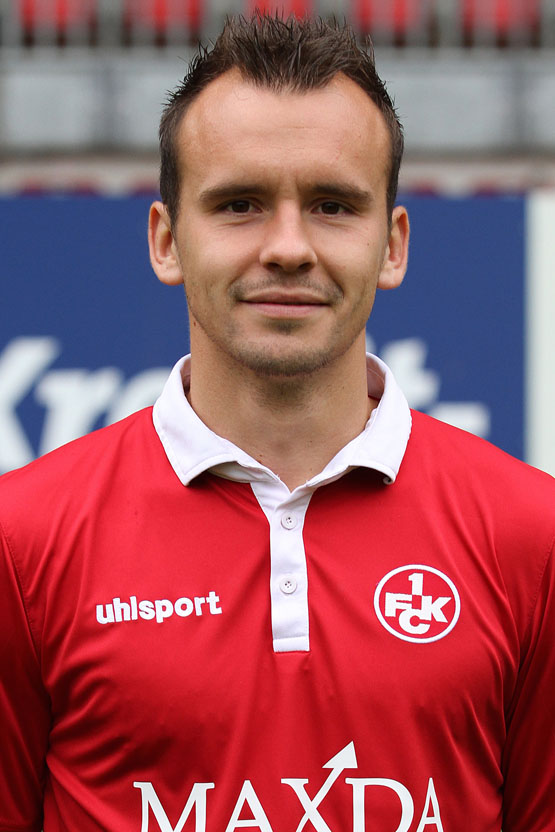
- Fomitschow in 2015

Personal information
- Date of birth: 7 September 1990 (age 36)
- Place of birth: Dresden, East Germany
- Height: 1.80 m (5 ft 11 in)
- Position: Left winger

Youth career
- –2003: FC Brome
- 2003–2009: VfL Wolfsburg

Senior career*
Years	Team	Apps	(Gls)
2009–2012	VfL Wolfsburg II	67	(21)
2012–2013	Fortuna Düsseldorf II	9	(3)
2012–2014	Fortuna Düsseldorf	1	(0)
2013–2014	→ Energie Cottbus (loan)	34	(1)
2014–2016	1. FC Kaiserslautern	24	(0)
2014	1. FC Kaiserslautern II	1	(0)
2016–2017	NEC Nijmegen	25	(0)
2017–2019	Hajduk Split	36	(1)
2018	Hajduk Split II	1	(0)
2021–2023	FSV Jägersburg	36	(8)
- * Club domestic league appearances and goals as of 05:40, 4 July 2024 (UTC)

André Fomitschow (born 7 September 1990) is a German professional footballer who plays as a left winger.

== Career ==
Born in Dresden, Fomitschow started his professional career with the reserve team of VfL Wolfsburg. During the 2011–12 season, he scored his career best of 17 goals in the season. On 10 June 2012, he joined Fortuna Düsseldorf on a three-year contract. On 27 November, he made his first team debut in a 1–1 draw against Borussia Dortmund. On 23 January 2013, he joined Energie Cottbus on a loan deal till the remainder of the season. After featuring 14 times for the side and scoring one goal against 1. FC Kaiserslautern, his loan deal was extended till the end of 2013–14 season on 5 June.

On 20 June 2014, Fomitschow joined 1. FC Kaiserslautern on a free transfer, penning a deal till 30 June 2016. In September 2015, he suffered a ligament injury during a 3–0 defeat against 1. FC Nürnberg.

On 31 August 2016, Fomitschow moved abroad and joined Dutch Eredivisie club NEC Nijmegen on a one-year contract. On 23 June 2017, he signed for Croatian club Hajduk Split on a two-year contract. On 16 July, he made his debut in a 3–1 victory over Lokomotiva. On 26 October, he scored his first goal (from a free kick) for the club in a 1–0 cup victory against Šibenik, which saw his side progressing to the next round. On 11 February 2018, he scored his first league goal in a 5–0 routing of Cibalia.

== Personal life ==
Fomitschow's parents are originally from Saint Petersburg, Russia. His mother-tongue is Russian.

== Career statistics ==
As of 2 April 2022

Appearances and goals by club, season and competition
Club	Season	League			Cup		Continental		Total	
Club	Season	Division	Apps	Goals	Apps	Goals	Apps	Goals	Apps	Goals
VfL Wolfsburg II	2009–10	Regionalliga	14	1	—		—		14	1
VfL Wolfsburg II	2010–11	Regionalliga	22	3	—		—		22	3
VfL Wolfsburg II	2011–12	Regionalliga	31	17	—		—		31	17
VfL Wolfsburg II	Total		67	21	—		—		67	21
Fortuna Düsseldorf II	2012–13	Regionalliga	9	3	—		—		9	3
Fortuna Düsseldorf	2012–13	Bundesliga	1	0	0	0	—		1	0
Energie Cottbus (loan)	2012–13	2. Bundesliga	14	1	0	0	—		14	1
Energie Cottbus (loan)	2013–14	2. Bundesliga	20	0	1	0	—		21	0
Energie Cottbus (loan)	Total		34	1	1	0	—		35	1
1. FC Kaiserslautern II	2014–15	Regionalliga	1	0	—		—		1	0
1. FC Kaiserslautern	2014–15	2. Bundesliga	11	0	3	0	—		14	0
1. FC Kaiserslautern	2015–16	2. Bundesliga	13	0	0	0	—		13	0
1. FC Kaiserslautern	Total		24	0	3	0	—		27	0
NEC Nijmegen	2016–17	Eredivisie	25	0	1	0	1 (Note: Appearance in Relegation Play-offs)	0	27	0
Hajduk Split	2017–18	1. HNL	20	1	4	1	0	0	24	2
Hajduk Split	2018–19	1. HNL	16	0	3	0	4 (Note: Appearances in UEFA Europa League)	0	23	0
Hajduk Split	Total		36	1	7	1	4	0	47	2
Hajduk Split II	2017–18	2. HNL	1	0	0	0	–		1	0
Career total			199	28	12	1	5	0	216	29
