= NK Novigrad =

Croatian football club

- Full name: Nogometni klub Novigrad - Club di Calcio Cittanova
- Founded: 1947
- Ground: Stadion Lako
- Capacity: 2,300
- Chairman: Zvonimir Hodak
- League: Istrian Third League North
- Website: https://m.facebook.com/NK-Novigrad-306167302871776/
Home colours	Away colours

NK Novigrad is a Croatian association football club founded in 1947 and based in the town of Novigrad in Istria County. It currently plays in the Istrian Third Football League.

== History ==
The club reached the third Croatian league for the first time in 2012.

The club played in the national cup several times after winning the regional cup, including in 2013 and 2017.

In 2020 the club's directors were accused of not paying several players, coaches, and support staff following the club's relegation.

The club were relegated in 2022 after withdrawing from the Third Division West, and after one inactive season they started playing in the lowest tier, Istrian third league north.

== Honours ==
- (Croatia) Treća HNL – West
  - Winners (1): 2015–16
