= Mario Musa =

Croatian professional footballer (born 1990)

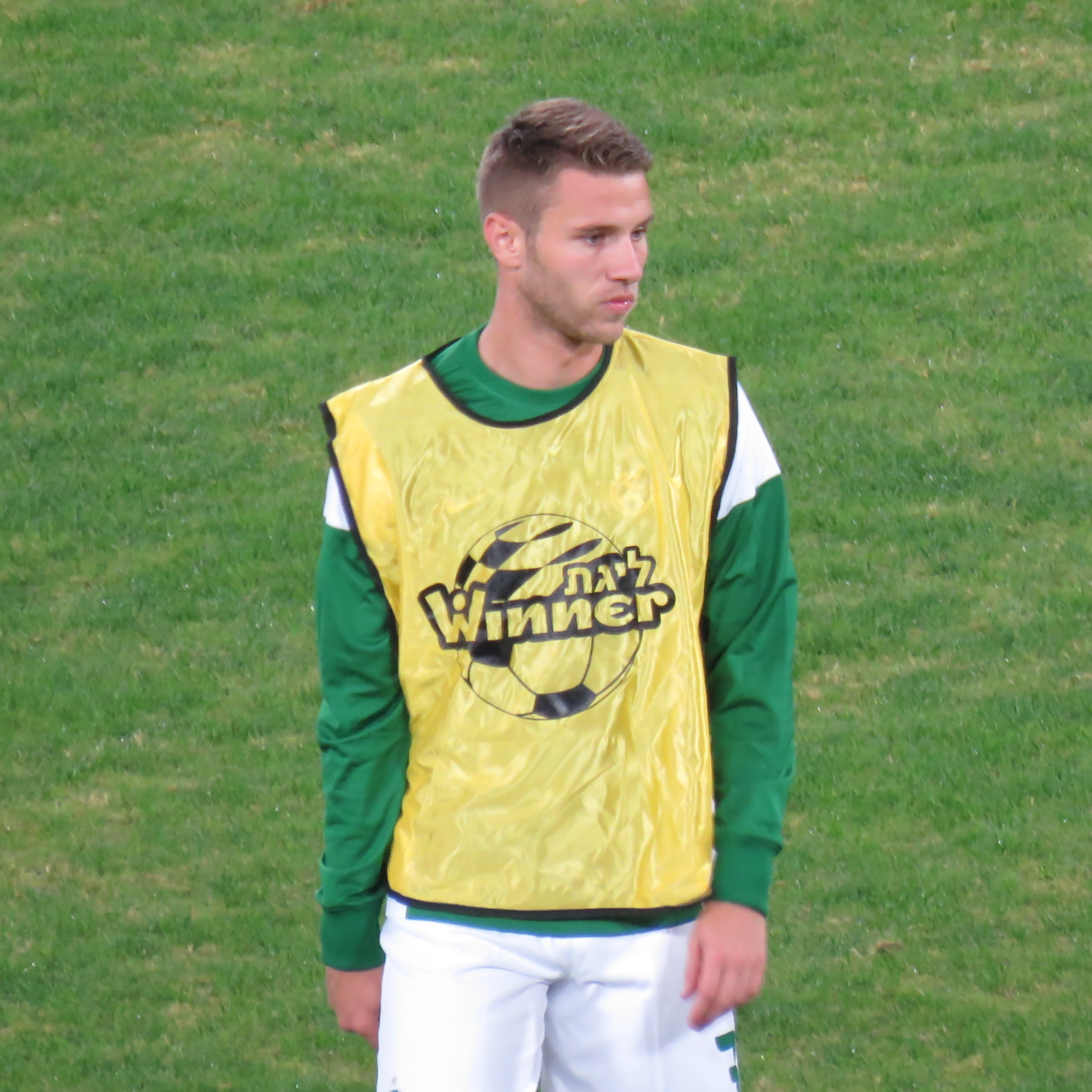
- Musa with Maccabi Haifa in 2016

Personal information
- Date of birth: 6 July 1990 (age 36)
- Place of birth: Zagreb, SFR Yugoslavia
- Height: 1.83 m (6 ft 0 in)
- Position: Left-back

Youth career
- 1996–2003: Zrinski Farkaševac
- 2003–2005: Posavina Zagreb
- 2005–2006: Samobor
- 2007–2009: Dinamo Zagreb

Senior career*
Years	Team	Apps	(Gls)
2009–2015	Lokomotiva Zagreb	106	(6)
2015–2019	Dinamo Zagreb	29	(2)
2015	→ Dinamo Zagreb II	4	(0)
2016	→ Maccabi Haifa (loan)	11	(0)
2017	→ Hammarby IF (loan)	2	(0)
2017–2018	→ Lokomotiva Zagreb (loan)	27	(3)
2021–2022	Lokomotiva Zagreb	6	(0)
2022	Aluminij	11	(0)

International career
2008	Croatia U18	3	(0)
2008	Croatia U19	2	(0)
2011	Croatia U21	2	(0)
- * Club domestic league appearances and goals as of 5 November 2022

Mario Musa (Croatian pronunciation: [ˈmaːriɔ ˈmuːsa]; born 6 July 1990) is a Croatian professional footballer who plays as a left-back.

== Club career ==
Born in Zagreb, Musa started playing football at his local Zrinski from Farkaševec Samoborski. After seven years at the club, he moved to Davor Šuker's academy at Posavina Zagreb and subsequently Samobor, before joining the Dinamo Zagreb academy in 2007.

Following his youth career Musa became a part of a series of loans and transfers between Dinamo Zagreb and Lokomotiva Zagreb, playing for Lokomotiva in the Prva HNL, but going on loans from Dinamo Zagreb or joining Lokomotiva on free transfers and returning, depending on loaned player quotas between the two clubs.

In January 2015, he returned to Dinamo Zagreb, but suffered an injury during training. He would go on to feature 17 times for the first team, scoring one goal, before being loaned on again, this time abroad, to Maccabi Haifa. He did not remain in Israel, however, but moved to Sweden, again on loan, in early 2017, signing for Hammarby Fotboll. He would go on to feature only twice for the Swedish club before returning to Croatia. Two more loan spells at Lokomotiva followed, with Zagreb pulling him back from his planned 2018–19 loan after only one month, in mid-August 2018, in need of a left-back to serve as alternate for Marin Leovac.

== International career ==
Musa featured in the Croatian under-21 team in 2011.
