= 2020–21 NK Osijek season =

Osijek
2020–21 season
- Owner: Lőrinc Mészáros (until 9 September 2020); NK OS d.o.o. (since 9 September 2020)
- President: Ferenc Szakály
- Manager: Ivica Kulešević (until 4 September 2020); Nenad Bjelica (since 5 September 2020)
- Stadium: Gradski Vrt Stadium
- Prva HNL: 2nd
- Croatian Cup: Quarter-finals
- UEFA Europa League: Second qualifying round
- Top goalscorer: League: Ramón Miérez (22); All: Ramón Miérez (23)
- Highest home attendance: 1,970 v Gorica (26 September 2020)
- Lowest home attendance: 1,970 v Gorica (26 September 2020)
- Average home league attendance: 109
colours	Away colours	Third colours

The 2020–21 NK Osijek season was the club's 74th season in existence and the 30th consecutive season in the top flight of Croatian football.

== Players ==
As of 4 May 2021

Note: Flags indicate national team as defined under FIFA eligibility rules; some limited exceptions apply. Players may hold more than one non-FIFA nationality.

No.	Pos.	Nation	Player
1	GK	CRO	Ivica Ivušić
2	DF	BRA	Igor Silva
3	DF	BRA	Talys
4	DF	BRA	Guti
5	MF	HUN	László Kleinheisler
7	MF	CRO	Vedran Jugović
8	MF	CGO	Merveil Ndockyt
9	FW	CRO	Ante Erceg (on loan from Brøndby)
10	MF	UKR	Dmytro Lyopa
11	FW	ALB	Eros Grezda
12	MF	CRO	Petar Bočkaj
13	FW	ARG	Ramón Miérez (on loan from Deportivo Alavés)
15	GK	CRO	Marko Barešić
17	MF	CRO	Petar Brlek
18	DF	ESP	José Antonio Caro

No.	Pos.	Nation	Player
19	MF	CRO	Mihael Žaper
20	DF	SLO	Mario Jurčević
21	DF	CRO	Mile Škorić (captain)
22	DF	CRO	Danijel Lončar
23	DF	CRO	Filip Mekić
24	FW	HUN	Ádám Gyurcsó
25	MF	CRO	Marin Pilj
26	FW	CRO	Ivan Santini
30	FW	AUT	Mihret Topčagić
33	GK	CRO	Antonijo Ježina
35	FW	CRO	Dion Drena Beljo
39	FW	SLO	Damjan Bohar
44	MF	CRO	Josip Vuković
77	DF	CRO	Mato Miloš
98	DF	UKR	Yevhen Cheberko (on loan from LASK)

== Transfers ==
=== In ===
Pos	Player	Transferred from	Fee	Date	Source
FW	(Croatia) Robert Mišković	(Croatia) Dinamo Zagreb	Return from loan	30 June 2020	
MF	(Republic of the Congo) Merveil Ndockyt	(Spain) Getafe	€550,000	1 August 2020	
DF	(Brazil) Igor Silva	(Greece) Olympiacos	€500,000	2 August 2020	
FW	(Croatia) Ante Erceg	(Denmark) Brøndby	Loan	19 August 2020	
GK	(Croatia) Antonijo Ježina	(Croatia) Slaven Belupo	Free	25 August 2020	
FW	(Argentina) Ramón Miérez	(Spain) Deportivo Alavés	Loan	27 August 2020	
DF	(Slovenia) Mario Jurčević	(Slovenia) Olimpija Ljubljana	Free	9 September 2020	
DF	(Spain) José Antonio Caro	(Spain) Albacete	Free	9 September 2020	
FW	(Slovenia) Damjan Bohar	(Poland) Zagłębie Lubin	€850,000	23 September 2020	
MF	(Croatia) Josip Vuković	(Portugal) Marítimo	Free	28 September 2020	
DF	(Croatia) Luka Marin	(Slovenia) Olimpija Ljubljana	Recalled from loan	31 December 2020	
FW	(Austria) Mihret Topčagić	(Lithuania) Sūduva	Free	6 January 2021	
DF	(Croatia) Mato Miloš	(Portugal) Aves	Free	13 January 2021	
MF	(Croatia) Petar Brlek	(Italy) Genoa	Free	15 January 2021	
MF	(Moldova) Mihail Caimacov	(Slovenia) Olimpija Ljubljana	Recalled from loan	31 January 2021	
DF	(Ukraine) Yevhen Cheberko	(Austria) LASK	Loan	5 February 2021	
FW	(Croatia) Ivan Santini	(China) Jiangsu Suning	Free	12 February 2021	
FW	(Hungary) Ádám Gyurcsó	(Croatia) Hajduk Split	Free	15 February 2021	
FW	(Argentina) Ramón Miérez	(Spain) Deportivo Alavés	€2,500,000	13 May 2021	

=== Out ===
Pos	Player	Transferred to	Fee	Date	Source
FW	(Nigeria) Jerry Mbakogu	Free agent	Released	3 July 2020	
MF	(Republic of the Congo) Merveil Ndockyt	(Spain) Getafe	Return from loan	31 July 2020	
DF	(Brazil) Igor Silva	(Greece) Olympiacos	Return from loan	31 July 2020	
MF	(Croatia) Karlo Kamenar	(Lithuania) Žalgiris	Loan	10 August 2020	
FW	(Croatia) Antonio Mance	(Hungary) Puskás Akadémia	Loan	10 August 2020	
GK	(Croatia) Marko Malenica	(Poland) Lech Poznań	Loan	10 August 2020	
MF	(Moldova) Mihail Caimacov	(Slovenia) Olimpija Ljubljana	Loan	12 August 2020	
FW	(Croatia) Mirko Marić	(Italy) Monza	€4,500,000	1 September 2020	
DF	(Croatia) Tomislav Šorša	(Kosovo) Gjilani	Free	3 September 2020	
FW	(Croatia) Josip Špoljarić	(Croatia) Istra 1961	Loan	28 September 2020	
DF	(Croatia) Robert Ćosić	(Croatia) Rudeš	Loan	28 September 2020	
DF	(Croatia) Luka Marin	(Slovenia) Olimpija Ljubljana	Loan	2 October 2020	
DF	(North Macedonia) Todor Todoroski	(Croatia) Šibenik	Loan	15 October 2020	
GK	(Croatia) Marko Malenica	(Hungary) Diósgyőri VTK	Loan	5 January 2021	
DF	(Croatia) Luka Marin	(Hungary) Diósgyőri VTK	Loan	15 January 2021	
MF	(Croatia) Ante Majstorović	(China) Shanghai Port F.C.	€3,310,000	17 January 2021	
MF	(Croatia) Alen Grgić	(Hungary) Diósgyőri VTK	Loan	18 January 2021	
DF	(Croatia) Robert Ćosić	(Croatia) Rudeš	Free	3 February 2021	
MF	(Moldova) Mihail Caimacov	(Slovenia) Koper	Loan	4 February 2021	
MF	(Croatia) Juraj Ljubić	(Bosnia and Herzegovina) Zrinjski Mostar	Free	4 February 2021	
MF	(Croatia) Karlo Kamenar	(Hungary) Mezőkövesd	Free	15 February 2021	
FW	(Croatia) Robert Mišković	(Bosnia and Herzegovina) Sloboda Tuzla	Loan	20 February 2021	
FW	(Argentina) Ramón Miérez	(Spain) Deportivo Alavés	Return from loan	13 May 2021	

▼ Total Spending: €4,400,000

▲ Total Income: €7,810,000

▲ Net Income: €3,410,000

== Competitions ==
=== Overview ===
Competition	First match	Last match	Starting round	Final position	Record							
Competition	First match	Last match	Starting round	Final position	Pld	W	D	L	GF	GA	GD	Win %
HT Prva liga	15 August 2020	22 May 2021	Matchday 1	2nd	36	23	8	5	59	25	+34	63.89
Croatian Cup	7 October 2020	3 March 2021	First round	Quarter-finals	3	2	0	1	10	3	+7	66.67
UEFA Europa League	17 September 2020		Second qualifying round	Second qualifying round	1	0	0	1	1	2	−1	0.00
Total					40	25	8	7	70	30	+40	62.50

Last updated: 23 May 2021
Source: Soccerway

=== HT Prva liga ===
==== League table ====
Pos	Team	Pld	W	D	L	GF	GA	GD	Pts	Qualification or relegation
1	Dinamo Zagreb (C)	36	26	7	3	84	28	+56	85	Qualification for the Champions League first qualifying round
2	Osijek	36	23	8	5	59	25	+34	77	Qualification for the Europa Conference League second qualifying round
3	Rijeka	36	18	7	11	51	46	+5	61	Qualification for the Europa Conference League second qualifying round
4	Hajduk Split	36	18	6	12	48	37	+11	60	Qualification for the Europa Conference League second qualifying round
5	Gorica	36	17	8	11	60	47	+13	59	

Source: PrvaHNL.hr
Rules for classification: 1) Points; 2) Head-to-head points; 3) Head-to-head goal difference; 4) Head-to-head goals scored (at home if two teams tied); 5) Goal difference; 6) Goals scored; 7) Play-off
(Note: Criteria 2-4 and 7 is only used if deciding champion, teams to international competition or teams for relegation and in that case criteria 6 will not be used).
(C) Champions

==== Results summary ====
Overall								Home						Away					
Pld	W	D	L	GF	GA	GD	Pts	W	D	L	GF	GA	GD	W	D	L	GF	GA	GD
36	23	8	5	59	25	+34	77	13	4	1	30	8	+22	10	4	4	29	17	+12

Last updated: 23 May 2021.
Source: Prva HNL

==== Results by round ====
Round	1	2	3	4	5	6	7	8	9	10	11	12	13	14	15	16	17	18	19	20	21	22	23	24	25	26	27	28	29	30	31	32	33	34	35	36
Ground	H	H	A	H	A	H	A	H	A	A	A	H	A	H	A	H	A	H	H	H	A	H	A	H	A	H	A	A	A	H	A	H	A	H	A	H
Result	D	L	L	W	W	W	W	W	W	W	D	W	D	W	L	W	W	W	W	W	L	W	W	D	W	W	W	D	W	D	D	D	L	W	W	W
Position	5	7	8	6	4	4	2	2	2	2	2	2	2	2	2	2	2	2	2	2	2	2	2	2	2	2	2	2	2	2	2	2	2	2	2	2

Updated to match(es) played on 22 May 2021. Source: Prva HNL
A = Away; H = Home; W = Win; D = Draw; L = Loss

==== Matches ====
15 August 2020 1	Osijek	0–0	Slaven Belupo	Osijek
20:05 CEST (UTC+02:00)	Škorić (yellow card) 26' (yellow-red card) 30'; Majstorović (yellow card) 70'	Report	Bačelić-Grgić (yellow card) 48'; Glavčić (yellow card) 67'; Lulić (yellow card) 87'	Stadium: Gradski Vrt Stadium; Attendance: 0 Referee: Ivan Bebek

23 August 2020 2	Osijek	1–2	Hajduk Split	Osijek
17:55 CEST (UTC+02:00)	Beljo (yellow card) 20'; Jugović 43'; Špoljarić (yellow card) 87'	Report	Jairo 34', (yellow card) 67'; Caktaš 36' (pen.); Posavec (yellow card) 56'; Jurić (yellow card) 88'	Stadium: Gradski Vrt Stadium; Attendance: 0 Referee: Mario Zebec

30 August 2020 3	Dinamo Zagreb	4–1	Osijek	Zagreb
20:05 CEST (UTC+02:00)	Gavranović 5'; Ademi (yellow card) 41', (goal) 71'; Petković (yellow card) 55'; Andrić 81' (pen.); Tolić 86' (pen.)	Report	Grezda 48', (yellow card) 58'; Talys (yellow card) 83'	Stadium: Stadion Maksimir; Attendance: 0 Referee: Mario Zebec

12 September 2020 4	Osijek	3–0	Rijeka	Osijek
19:00 CEST (UTC+02:00)	Jugović 5'; Bočkaj 38'; Erceg (yellow card) 43'; Miérez 75'; Pilj (yellow card) 77'	Report	Arsenić (red card) 37'; Tomečak (yellow card) 45'; Gnezda Čerin (yellow card) 57'; Andrijašević (yellow card) 61'; Čolak (yellow card) 73'	Stadium: Gradski Vrt Stadium; Attendance: 0 Referee: Marko Matoc

20 September 2020 5	Varaždin	0–1	Osijek	Varaždin
19:05 CEST (UTC+02:00)	Obregón (yellow card) 12'	Report	Žaper 15'; Majstorović (yellow card) 45+2'; Jugović (yellow card) 52'	Stadium: Stadion Varteks; Attendance: 1,437; Referee: Ivan Bebek

26 September 2020 6	Osijek	2–1	Gorica	Osijek
19:05 CEST (UTC+02:00)	Miérez 45+2' (pen.); Grgić 90+7'; Ndockyt (yellow card) 90+10'	Report	Babec (yellow card) 16'; Doka (yellow card) 45+2' (yellow-red card) 72'; Lovrić 84'	Stadium: Gradski Vrt Stadium; Attendance: 1,970; Referee: Marin Vidulin

3 October 2020 7	Šibenik	0–2	Osijek	Šibenik
17:00 CEST (UTC+02:00)	Pandža (yellow card) 25'; Sahiti (yellow card) 46'; Kvesić (yellow card) 71'	Report	Miérez 68' 75' (pen.); Igor Silva (yellow card) 90+5'	Stadium: Stadion Šubićevac; Attendance: 1,173; Referee: Ante Čuljak

31 October 2020 10	Slaven Belupo	0–1	Osijek	Koprivnica
15:00 CEST (UTC+02:00)	Paracki (yellow card) 64'	Report	Bohar 47'; Caro (yellow card) 54'; Lončar (yellow card) 60'; Jurčević (yellow card) 84'	Stadium: Gradski stadion Attendance: 0 Referee: Marko Matoc

4 November 2020 8	Osijek	2–1	Lokomotiva	Osijek
17:00 CET (UTC+01:00)	Pilj 9' (yellow card) 49'; Miérez 40' (pen.); Jurčević (yellow card) 90+2'	Report	Đira (yellow card) 22'; Petrak (yellow card) 37'; Chajia 73'	Stadium: Gradski Vrt Stadium; Attendance: 0 Referee: Dario Kulušić

7 November 2020 11	Hajduk Split	1–1	Osijek	Split
17:00 CET (UTC+01:00)	Vušković (yellow card) 47'; Čolina 55'	Report	Miérez 23'; Lyopa (yellow card) 50'; Ivušić (yellow card) 90+6'	Stadium: Stadion Poljud; Attendance: 0 Referee: Fran Jović

21 November 2020 12	Osijek	2–0	Dinamo Zagreb	Osijek
15:00 CET (UTC+01:00)	Škorić (yellow card) 27'; Vuković (yellow card) 45'; Pilj 54'; Žaper 90'	Report	Théophile-Catherine (yellow card) 1'; Jakić (yellow card) 58'; Lauritsen (yellow card) 59'; Leovac (yellow card) 90+2'	Stadium: Gradski Vrt Stadium; Attendance: 0 Referee: Duje Strukan

25 November 2020 9	Istra 1961	1–4	Osijek	Pula
17:00 CET (UTC+01:00)	Špoljarić 7'; Vuk (yellow card) 34'; Blagojević (yellow card) 44'; Perera (yellow card) 45+1'	Report	Miérez 31' (yellow card) 52'; Bohar 45' (pen.); Žaper 68'; Erceg (yellow card) 74' (goal) 75'; Talys (yellow card) 84'	Stadium: Stadion Aldo Drosina; Attendance: 0 Referee: Goran Pečarić

29 November 2020 13	Rijeka	1–1	Osijek	Rijeka
17:05 CET (UTC+01:00)	Pavičić (yellow card) 16' (yellow-red card) 60'; Andrijašević 64'	Report	Vuković (yellow card) 13'; Igor Silva (yellow card) 37'; Miérez (yellow card) 60'; Bočkaj 83'	Stadium: Stadion Rujevica; Attendance: 0 Referee: Fran Jović

5 December 2020 14	Osijek	1–0	Varaždin	Osijek
15:00 CET (UTC+01:00)	Škorić (yellow card) 44'; Bohar 60'; Ivušić (yellow card) 90+2'	Report	Senić (yellow card) 28'; Grgec (yellow card) 66'; Đurasek (yellow card) 70'; Daničić (yellow card) 90'	Stadium: Gradski Vrt Stadium; Attendance: 0 Referee: Goran Pečarić

12 December 2020 15	Gorica	4–1	Osijek	Velika Gorica
15:00 CET (UTC+01:00)	Dieye 13'; Lovrić (yellow card) 26'; Špikić (yellow card) 39'; Moro (yellow card) 46'; Kalik 54' 65'; Mitrović 77'	Report	Miérez 49'; Majstorović (yellow card) 87'	Stadium: Stadion Radnik; Attendance: 0 Referee: Fran Jović

19 December 2020 16	Osijek	1–0	Šibenik	Osijek
15:00 CET (UTC+01:00)	Škorić 18'; Igor Silva (yellow card) 68'; Bočkaj (yellow card) 72'; Vuković (yellow card) 77'; Žaper (yellow card) 90'	Report	Rak (yellow card) 35'; Batarelo (yellow card) 73'; Alimi (yellow card) 80'	Stadium: Gradski Vrt Stadium; Attendance: 0 Referee: Igor Pajač

22 January 2021 17	Lokomotiva	0–3	Osijek	Zagreb
15:00 CET (UTC+01:00)	Papadopoulos (yellow card) 31' (yellow-red card) 48'; Çokaj (yellow card) 34'; Marić (yellow card) 54'	Report	Miérez 18' 35' (pen.); Škorić (yellow card) 38'; Bočkaj (yellow card) 52'; Bohar 58'	Stadium: Stadion Kranjčevićeva; Attendance: 0 Referee: Ivan Bebek

30 January 2021 18	Osijek	1–0	Istra 1961	Osijek
15:00 CET (UTC+01:00)	Miérez (yellow card) 6' (goal) 30' (pen.); Žaper (yellow card) 86'; Jurčević (yellow card) 89'	Report	Lončar (yellow card) 13'; Tomašević (yellow card) 45+3'; Hujber (yellow card) 52'; G. Kim (yellow card) 88'; J. Šutalo (yellow card) 90+4'	Stadium: Gradski Vrt Stadium; Attendance: 0 Referee: Duje Strukan

2 February 2021 19	Osijek	3–0	Slaven Belupo	Osijek
16:00 CET (UTC+01:00)	Erceg (yellow card) 24'; Brlek 45+3'; Žaper 52'; Bohar 55'	Report	Bačelić-Grgić (yellow card) 37'; Prce (yellow card) 44'; Paracki (yellow card) 76'	Stadium: Gradski Vrt Stadium; Attendance: 0 Referee: Dario Kulušić

6 February 2021 20	Osijek	2–0	Hajduk Split	Osijek
15:00 CET (UTC+01:00)	Igor Silva (yellow card) 36'; Kleinheisler 59'; Miérez (yellow card) 75' (goal) 89'; Lončar (yellow card) 85'	Report	Simić (yellow card) 11'; Mujakić (yellow card) 44' (yellow-red card) 51'; Dimitrov (yellow card) 82'	Stadium: Gradski Vrt Stadium; Attendance: 0 Referee: Ivan Bebek

13 February 2021 21	Dinamo Zagreb	1–0	Osijek	Zagreb
17:05 CET (UTC+01:00)	Oršić 15'; Ristovski (yellow card) 72' (yellow-red card) 77'; Petković (yellow card) 90+1'	Report	Vuković (yellow card) 27'; Kleinheisler (yellow card) 70'; Bočkaj (yellow card) 75'; Miérez (yellow card) 89'; Guti (yellow card) 90+2'	Stadium: Stadion Maksimir; Attendance: 0 Referee: Ivan Bebek

21 February 2021 22	Osijek	2–0	Rijeka	Osijek
15:00 CET (UTC+01:00)	Miérez 25' 69'	Report	Pavičić (yellow card) 90+2'	Stadium: Gradski Vrt Stadium; Attendance: 0 Referee: Duje Strukan

26 February 2021 23	Varaždin	2–3	Osijek	Varaždin
18:00 CET (UTC+01:00)	Peco 16'; Herrera 21'; Pëllumbi (yellow card) 30'; Grgec (yellow card) 51'	Report	Lončar (yellow card) 8'; Miérez 52' (pen.), 78'; Santini 68'; Jugović (yellow card) 71'	Stadium: Stadion Varteks; Attendance: 0 Referee: Goran Pečarić

7 March 2021 24	Osijek	1–1	Gorica	Osijek
15:00 CET (UTC+01:00)	Škorić (yellow card) 71'; Igor Silva (yellow card) 73'; Bohar 88' (pen.)	Report	Nimely (yellow card) 20'; Dieye 55'; Martinsson Ngouali (yellow card) 67'; Mitrović (yellow card) 80'	Stadium: Gradski Vrt Stadium; Attendance: 0 Referee: Ivan Bebek

14 March 2021 25	Šibenik	0–4	Osijek	Šibenik
17:05 CET (UTC+01:00)	Mesa (yellow card) 40'	Report	Santini (yellow card) 5' (goal) 49'; Kleinheisler 13'; Miérez 47'; Lončar (yellow card) 65'; Erceg 85'	Stadium: Stadion Šubićevac; Attendance: 0 Referee: Mario Zebec

19 March 2021 26	Osijek	2–0	Lokomotiva	Osijek
18:00 CET (UTC+01:00)	Kleinheisler 14'; Vuković (yellow card) 68'; Miérez 79'	Report	Šimić (yellow card) 19'; Marin (yellow card) 25'; Lešković (yellow card) 66'; Çokaj (yellow card) 75'	Stadium: Gradski Vrt Stadium; Attendance: 0 Referee: Marin Vidulin

3 April 2021 27	Istra 1961	0–2	Osijek	Pula
15:00 CEST (UTC+02:00)	Bosančić (yellow card) 12'	Report	Miérez 30'; Erceg 88'	Stadium: Stadion Aldo Drosina; Attendance: 0 Referee: Fran Jović

11 April 2021 28	Slaven Belupo	2–2	Osijek	Koprivnica
15:00 CEST (UTC+02:00)	Bogojević 36'; van Bruggen (yellow card) 50'; Knöll 52'; Paracki (yellow card) 55'; Prce (yellow card) 60'	Report	Igor Silva (yellow card) 19'; Žaper 45+1'; Kleinheisler 71'	Stadium: Gradski stadion Attendance: 0 Referee: Dario Kulušić

16 April 2021 29	Hajduk Split	0–1	Osijek	Split
20:30 CEST (UTC+02:00)	Vušković (yellow card) 31'; Todorović (yellow card) 45'; Simić (yellow card) 78'; Fossati (yellow card) 83' (yellow-red card) 85'; Diamantakos (yellow card) 90+3'	Report	Jugović (yellow card) 39'; Miérez 48'; Kleinheisler (yellow card) 53'; Lončar (yellow card) 83'; Bočkaj (yellow card) 90+6'	Stadium: Stadion Poljud; Attendance: 0 Referee: Ivan Bebek

21 April 2021 30	Osijek	1–1	Dinamo Zagreb	Osijek
20:30 CEST (UTC+02:00)	Igor Silva (yellow card) 36'; Kleinheisler (yellow card) 59'; Žaper (yellow card) 60'; Erceg 64'; Cheberko (yellow card) 65'	Report	Majer 5' (yellow card) 78'; Ristovski (yellow card) 24'; Ademi (yellow card) 56'; Petković (yellow card) 90'; Lauritsen (yellow card) 90+3'	Stadium: Gradski Vrt Stadium; Attendance: 0 Referee: Mario Zebec

25 April 2021 31	Rijeka	0–0	Osijek	Rijeka
17:00 CEST (UTC+02:00)	Capan (yellow card) 26'; Andrijašević (yellow card) 46'; S. Lončar (yellow card) 61'; Smolčić (yellow card) 79'; Murić (yellow card) 85'	Report	Erceg (yellow card) 14'; Jugović (yellow card) 59'; D. Lončar (yellow card) 75' (yellow-red card) 90+3'; Santini (yellow card) 78'; Škorić (yellow card) 80'	Stadium: Stadion Rujevica; Attendance: 0 Referee: Fran Jović

2 May 2021 32	Osijek	1–1	Varaždin	Osijek
19:05 CEST (UTC+02:00)	Igor Silva (yellow card) 58'; Cheberko (yellow card) 62'; Miérez 74'; Lyopa (yellow card) 77'	Report	Posavec (yellow card) 38'; Vuk (yellow card) 63'; Obregón 69'; Čelić (yellow card) 79'	Stadium: Gradski Vrt Stadium; Attendance: 0 Referee: Dario Kulušić

7 May 2021 33	Gorica	1–0	Osijek	Velika Gorica
19:10 CEST (UTC+02:00)	Martinsson Ngouali (yellow card) 34'; Jovičić 49'	Report	Guti (yellow card) 79'; Škorić (yellow card) 84'	Stadium: Stadion Radnik; Attendance: 0 Referee: Ivan Bebek

11 May 2021 34	Osijek	3–0	Šibenik	Osijek
19:05 CEST (UTC+02:00)	Žaper (yellow card) 31'; Santini 65'; Miérez 73'; Gyurcsó 90+3'	Report	Bulat (yellow card) 33'; Torres (yellow card) 42'; Mina (yellow card) 81'	Stadium: Gradski Vrt Stadium; Attendance: 0 Referee: Marin Vidulin

16 May 2021 35	Lokomotiva	0–2	Osijek	Zagreb
19:05 CEST (UTC+02:00)	Stojković (yellow card) 44'; Çokaj (yellow card) 69'; Lešković (yellow card) 72'	Report	Cheberko (yellow card) 21'; Santini (yellow card) 45+1'; Lyopa (yellow card) 45+2'; Kleinheisler 60'; Bočkaj (yellow card) 76'; Bohar 90+2'; Barišić (yellow card) 90+5'	Stadium: Stadion Kranjčevićeva; Attendance: 0 Referee: Dario Kulušić

23 May 2021 36	Osijek	2–1	Istra 1961	Osijek
17:00 CEST (UTC+02:00)	Kleinheisler 34'; Beljo 90+2'	Report	Ivančić 41'; Sergi (yellow card) 65'; Hujber (yellow card) 90+2'	Stadium: Gradski Vrt Stadium; Attendance: 0 Referee: Duje Strukan

Source: Croatian Football Federation

=== Croatian Football Cup ===
6 October 2020 First round	Crikvenica	1–5	Osijek	Crikvenica
15:00 CET (UTC+01:00)	Matešković (yellow card) 9'; Prpić 51'	Report	Erceg 10' (pen.); Lončar 14'; Miérez 24'; Jugović 27'; Mišković 47'	Stadium: Gradski stadion Attendance: 0 Referee: Marino Majstorović

14 November 2020 Second round	Kurilovec	0–4	Osijek	Velika Gorica
13:30 CET (UTC+01:00)	Matoš (yellow card) 54'; Muhar (yellow card) 83'	Report	Bočkaj 38'; Pilj 52', 75'; Lyopa (yellow card) 56', (goal) 82'	Stadium: SRC Udarnik; Attendance: 0 Referee: Mario Zebec

3 March 2021 Quarter-finals	Osijek	1–2	Rijeka	Osijek
17:00 CET (UTC+01:00)	Škorić 14'; Jurčević (yellow card) 70'; Igor Silva (yellow card) 90+5'	Report	Murić 7', 71' (pen.); Vukčević (yellow card) 34'; Gnezda Čerin (yellow card) 60'; Menalo (yellow card) 90'	Stadium: Gradski Vrt Stadium; Attendance: 0 Referee: Mario Zebec

Source: Croatian Football Federation

=== UEFA Europa League ===
17 September 2020 Second qualifying round	Osijek (Croatia)	1–2	(Switzerland) Basel	Osijek, Croatia
20:45 CEST (UTC+02:00)	Žaper (yellow card) 69'; Igor Silva (yellow card) 75'; Majstorović 84'	Report	Cabral 18', (yellow card) 49'; Widmer (yellow card) 39'; Stocker 44', (yellow card) 90+1'; Padula (yellow card) 86'	Stadium: Gradski Vrt Stadium; Attendance: 0 Referee: José Luis Munuera Montero (Spain)

Source: uefa.com

=== Friendlies ===
==== Pre-season ====
5 August 2020 Friendly	Budafoki (Hungary)	1–1	(Croatia) Osijek	Felcsút, Hungary
18:00 CEST (UTC+02:00)	Skribek 55'	Report	Grezda 34'	Stadium: Pancho Aréna; Referee: József Erdős

8 August 2020 Friendly	Zalaegerszeg (Hungary)	Cancelled	(Croatia) Osijek	Felcsút, Hungary
18:00 CEST (UTC+02:00)				Stadium: Pancho Aréna

8 August 2020 Friendly	Puskás Akadémia (Hungary)	3–1	(Croatia) Osijek	Felcsút, Hungary
18:00 CEST (UTC+02:00)	Knežević 30'; Plšek 54'; Băluță 77' (pen.)	Report	Špoljarić 37'	Stadium: Pancho Aréna; Referee: Tamas Apko

==== Mid-season ====
9 January 2021 Friendly	Osijek (Croatia)	2–3	(Austria) Sturm Graz	Rovinj, Croatia
14:30 CET (UTC+01:00)	Bočkaj 50'; Lyopa 60'	Report	Gazibegović 19'; Wüthrich 31'; Kuen (yellow card) 43'; Siebenhandl (yellow card) 71'; Mwepu 75'; Jäger (yellow card) 79'	Stadium: Stadion Valbruna

15 January 2021 Friendly	Osijek (Croatia)	1–2	(Slovenia) Koper	Rovinj, Croatia
14:00 CET (UTC+01:00)	Erceg 32'	Report	Bešir (yellow card) 66'; Palčič 83'; Vekić 87'	Stadium: Stadion Valbruna

16 January 2021 Friendly	Osijek (Croatia)	2–2	(Hungary) Fehérvár	Rovinj, Croatia
11:00 CET (UTC+01:00)	Miérez 45' 70'	Report	Musliu (yellow card) 38'; Halmai 50'; Dárdai 61'	Stadium: Stadion Valbruna

== Player seasonal records ==
Updated 23 May 2021

=== Goals ===
Rank	Name	League	Europe	Cup	Total
1	(Argentina) Ramón Miérez	22	–	1	23
2	(Slovenia) Damjan Bohar	7	–	–	7
3	(Hungary) László Kleinheisler	6	–	–	6
4	(Croatia) Mihael Žaper	5	–	–	5
4	(Croatia) Ante Erceg	4	–	1	5
6	(Croatia) Marin Pilj	2	–	2	4
7	(Croatia) Ivan Santini	3	–	–	3
7	(Croatia) Petar Bočkaj	2	–	1	3
7	(Croatia) Vedran Jugović	2	–	1	3
10	(Croatia) Mile Škorić	1	–	1	2
11	(Croatia) Dion Drena Beljo	1	–	–	1
11	(Croatia) Petar Brlek	1	–	–	1
11	(Albania) Eros Grezda	1	–	–	1
11	(Croatia) Alen Grgić	1	–	–	1
11	(Hungary) Ádám Gyurcsó	1	–	–	1
11	(Croatia) Ante Majstorović	–	1	–	1
11	(Croatia) Danijel Lončar	–	–	1	1
11	(Ukraine) Dmytro Lyopa	–	–	1	1
11	(Croatia) Robert Mišković	–	–	1	1
TOTALS		59	1	10	70

Source: Competitive matches

=== Clean sheets ===
Rank	Name	League	Europe	Cup	Total
1	(Croatia) Ivica Ivušić	20	–	–	20
2	(Croatia) Antonijo Ježina	–	–	1	1
TOTALS		20	0	1	21

Source: Competitive matches

=== Disciplinary record ===
Number	Position	Player	1. HNL			Europe			Croatian Cup			Total		
Number	Position	Player	Yellow card	(yellow card) (yellow-red card)	Red card	Yellow card	(yellow card) (yellow-red card)	Red card	Yellow card	(yellow card) (yellow-red card)	Red card	Yellow card	(yellow card) (yellow-red card)	Red card
1	GK	(Croatia) Ivica Ivušić	2	0	0	0	0	0	0	0	0	2	0	0
2	DF	(Brazil) Igor Silva	8	0	0	1	0	0	1	0	0	10	0	0
3	DF	(Brazil) Talys	2	0	0	0	0	0	0	0	0	2	0	0
4	DF	(Brazil) Guti	2	0	0	0	0	0	0	0	0	2	0	0
5	MF	(Hungary) László Kleinheisler	3	0	0	0	0	0	0	0	0	3	0	0
6	DF	(Croatia) Ante Majstorović	3	0	0	0	0	0	0	0	0	3	0	0
7	MF	(Croatia) Vedran Jugović	4	0	0	0	0	0	0	0	0	4	0	0
8	MF	(Republic of the Congo) Merveil Ndockyt	1	0	0	0	0	0	0	0	0	1	0	0
9	FW	(Croatia) Ante Erceg	4	0	0	0	0	0	0	0	0	4	0	0
10	MF	(Ukraine) Dmytro Lyopa	3	0	0	0	0	0	1	0	0	4	0	0
11	FW	(Albania) Eros Grezda	1	0	0	0	0	0	0	0	0	1	0	0
12	MF	(Croatia) Petar Bočkaj	5	0	0	0	0	0	0	0	0	5	0	0
13	FW	(Argentina) Ramón Miérez	5	0	0	0	0	0	0	0	0	5	0	0
17	FW	(Croatia) Josip Špoljarić	1	0	0	0	0	0	0	0	0	1	0	0
18	DF	(Spain) José Antonio Caro	1	0	0	0	0	0	0	0	0	1	0	0
19	MF	(Croatia) Mihael Žaper	4	0	0	1	0	0	0	0	0	5	0	0
20	DF	(Slovenia) Mario Jurčević	3	0	0	0	0	0	1	0	0	4	0	0
21	DF	(Croatia) Mile Škorić	6	1	0	0	0	0	0	0	0	6	1	0
22	DF	(Croatia) Danijel Lončar	5	1	0	0	0	0	0	0	0	5	1	0
25	MF	(Croatia) Marin Pilj	2	0	0	0	0	0	0	0	0	2	0	0
26	FW	(Croatia) Ivan Santini	3	0	0	0	0	0	0	0	0	3	0	0
27	DF	(Bosnia and Herzegovina) Adrian Leon Barišić	1	0	0	0	0	0	0	0	0	1	0	0
35	FW	(Croatia) Dion Drena Beljo	1	0	0	0	0	0	0	0	0	1	0	0
44	MF	(Croatia) Josip Vuković	5	0	0	0	0	0	0	0	0	5	0	0
98	DF	(Ukraine) Yevhen Cheberko	3	0	0	0	0	0	0	0	0	3	0	0
TOTALS			78	2	0	2	0	0	3	0	0	83	2	0

=== Appearances and goals ===
Number	Position	Player	Apps	Goals	Apps	Goals	Apps	Goals	Apps	Goals
Number	Position	Player	Total		1. HNL (Note: First number represents appearances in starting eleven, while the second number indicates a substitute appearance.)		Europa League		Croatian Cup	
1	GK	(Croatia) Ivica Ivušić	38	0	36+0	0	1+0	0	1+0	0
2	DF	(Brazil) Igor Silva	35	0	29+2	0	1+0	0	1+2	0
3	DF	(Brazil) Talys	11	0	5+3	0	1+0	0	2+0	0
4	DF	(Brazil) Guti	16	0	7+8	0	0+0	0	0+1	0
5	MF	(Hungary) László Kleinheisler	34	6	22+9	6	1+0	0	2+0	0
6	DF	(Croatia) Ante Majstorović	17	1	14+0	0	1+0	1	1+1	0
6	MF	(Croatia) Šimun Mikolčić	1	0	0+1	0	0+0	0	0+0	0
7	MF	(Croatia) Vedran Jugović	26	3	16+7	2	1+0	0	2+0	1
8	MF	(Republic of the Congo) Merveil Ndockyt	12	0	7+5	0	0+0	0	0+0	0
9	FW	(Croatia) Ante Erceg	30	5	9+18	4	1+0	0	2+0	1
10	MF	(Ukraine) Dmytro Lyopa	16	1	5+10	0	0+0	0	1+0	1
11	FW	(Albania) Eros Grezda	5	1	3+1	1	1+0	0	0+0	0
12	MF	(Croatia) Petar Bočkaj	32	3	22+7	2	1+0	0	1+1	1
13	FW	(Argentina) Ramón Miérez	35	23	30+1	22	0+1	0	3+0	1
14	FW	(Croatia) Martin Sekulić	1	0	0+1	0	0+0	0	0+0	0
16	FW	(Croatia) Luka Branšteter	1	0	0+1	0	0+0	0	0+0	0
16	FW	(Croatia) Robert Mišković	5	1	0+3	0	0+0	0	0+2	1
17	MF	(Croatia) Petar Brlek	6	1	4+2	1	0+0	0	0+0	0
17	FW	(Croatia) Josip Špoljarić	3	0	1+2	0	0+0	0	0+0	0
18	DF	(Spain) José Antonio Caro	7	0	3+2	0	0+0	0	1+1	0
19	MF	(Croatia) Mihael Žaper	33	5	30+0	5	1+0	0	2+0	0
20	DF	(Slovenia) Mario Jurčević	24	0	18+5	0	0+0	0	1+0	0
21	DF	(Croatia) Mile Škorić	34	2	30+0	1	1+0	0	2+1	1
22	DF	(Croatia) Danijel Lončar	24	1	15+5	0	1+0	0	2+1	1
23	DF	(Croatia) Alen Grgić	7	1	0+4	1	0+1	0	2+0	0
23	DF	(Croatia) Filip Mekić	3	0	0+3	0	0+0	0	0+0	0
24	FW	(Hungary) Ádám Gyurcsó	5	1	2+2	1	0+0	0	0+1	0
25	MF	(Croatia) Marin Pilj	34	4	21+9	2	0+1	0	1+2	2
26	FW	(Croatia) Ivan Santini	13	3	6+6	3	0+0	0	0+1	0
27	DF	(Bosnia and Herzegovina) Adrian Leon Barišić	3	0	2+1	0	0+0	0	0+0	0
29	MF	(Croatia) Juraj Ljubić	2	0	1+1	0	0+0	0	0+0	0
29	MF	(Croatia) Dario Pudić	1	0	0+1	0	0+0	0	0+0	0
30	MF	(Croatia) Domagoj Babin	1	0	0+1	0	0+0	0	0+0	0
30	DF	(North Macedonia) Todor Todoroski	2	0	0+2	0	0+0	0	0+0	0
33	GK	(Croatia) Antonijo Ježina	2	0	0+0	0	0+0	0	2+0	0
35	FW	(Croatia) Dion Drena Beljo	10	1	1+8	1	0+0	0	0+1	0
39	FW	(Slovenia) Damjan Bohar	32	7	25+6	7	0+0	0	1+0	0
44	MF	(Croatia) Josip Vuković	22	0	10+10	0	0+0	0	2+0	0
77	DF	(Croatia) Mato Miloš	14	0	10+3	0	0+0	0	1+0	0
98	DF	(Ukraine) Yevhen Cheberko	13	0	12+1	0	0+0	0	0+0	0
