= 2021–22 NK Osijek season =

Osijek
2021–22 season
- Owner: NK OS d.o.o.
- President: Ferenc Szakály
- Head coach: Nenad Bjelica
- Stadium: Gradski Vrt Stadium
- Prva HNL: 3rd
- Croatian Cup: Semi-finals
- UEFA Europa Conference League: Third qualifying round
- Top goalscorer: League: Mijo Caktaš; Mihael Žaper (5 each); All: Mijo Caktaš (6)
- Highest home attendance: 7,181 v Hajduk Split (3 April 2022)
- Lowest home attendance: 551 v Šibenik (16 July 2021)
- Average home league attendance: 2,764
Home colours	Away colours	Third colours

The 2021–22 NK Osijek season was the club's 75th season in existence and the 31st consecutive season in the top flight of Croatian football.

== Players ==
As of 19 February 2022

Note: Flags indicate national team as defined under FIFA eligibility rules; some limited exceptions apply. Players may hold more than one non-FIFA nationality.

No.	Pos.	Nation	Player
1	GK	CRO	Ivica Ivušić
2	DF	CRO	Karlo Bartolec
4	DF	CRO	Marin Leovac
5	MF	HUN	László Kleinheisler
6	MF	CRO	Darko Nejašmić (on loan from Hajduk Split)
7	MF	CRO	Vedran Jugović
8	MF	CGO	Merveil Ndockyt
9	FW	CRO	Ante Erceg (on loan from Brøndby)
10	MF	BIH	Amer Hiroš
11	MF	CRO	Mijo Caktaš
13	FW	ARG	Ramón Miérez
14	MF	CRO	Ivan Fiolić
18	MF	ESP	Diego Barri
19	MF	CRO	Mihael Žaper
20	DF	SLO	Mario Jurčević

No.	Pos.	Nation	Player
21	DF	CRO	Mile Škorić (captain)
22	DF	GER	Danijel Lončar
23	MF	CRO	Petar Brlek
27	FW	CRO	Vinko Petković
28	DF	CRO	Slavko Bralić
29	FW	CRO	Kristian Fućak
30	FW	AUT	Mihret Topčagić
31	GK	CRO	Marko Malenica
32	DF	CRO	Alen Grgić
39	FW	SLO	Damjan Bohar
44	FW	CRO	Kristijan Lovrić
77	DF	CRO	Mato Miloš
95	FW	CRO	Antonio Mance
98	DF	UKR	Yevhen Cheberko

== Transfers ==
=== In ===
Pos	Player	Transferred from	Fee	Date	Source
MF	(Bosnia and Herzegovina) Amer Hiroš	(Bosnia and Herzegovina) Mladost Doboj Kakanj	Free	24 May 2021	
GK	(Croatia) Marko Malenica	(Hungary) Diósgyőri VTK	Return from loan	1 June 2021	
DF	(Croatia) Slavko Bralić	(Serbia) Vojvodina	Free	1 June 2021	
DF	(Croatia) Alen Grgić	(Hungary) Diósgyőri VTK	Return from loan	1 June 2021	
DF	(Croatia) Luka Marin	(Hungary) Diósgyőri VTK	Return from loan	1 June 2021	
DF	(North Macedonia) Todor Todoroski	(Croatia) Šibenik	Return from loan	1 June 2021	
MF	(Moldova) Mihail Caimacov	(Slovenia) Koper	Return from loan	1 June 2021	
FW	(Croatia) Antonio Mance	(Hungary) Puskás Akadémia	Return from loan	1 June 2021	
FW	(Croatia) Robert Mišković	(Bosnia and Herzegovina) Sloboda Tuzla	Return from loan	1 June 2021	
FW	(Croatia) Josip Špoljarić	(Croatia) Istra 1961	Return from loan	1 June 2021	
FW	(Croatia) Šime Gržan	(Croatia) Istra 1961	Free	17 June 2021	
MF	(Croatia) Darko Nejašmić	(Croatia) Hajduk Split	Loan	21 June 2021	
MF	(Croatia) Ivan Fiolić	(Belgium) Genk	Free	16 July 2021	
DF	(Croatia) Karlo Bartolec	(Denmark) Copenhagen	€250,000	2 August 2021	
DF	(Ukraine) Yevhen Cheberko	(Austria) LASK	€500,000	2 January 2022	
DF	(Brazil) Talys	(Hungary) Honvéd	Recalled from loan	6 January 2021	
FW	(Croatia) Kristian Fućak	(Croatia) Orijent 1919	€100,000	6 January 2022	
FW	(Croatia) Vinko Petković	(Croatia) Hrvatski Dragovoljac	Free	18 January 2022	
MF	(Croatia) Mijo Caktaš	(Saudi Arabia) Damac	Free	21 January 2022	
DF	(Croatia) Marin Leovac	(Croatia) Dinamo Zagreb	€300,000	26 January 2022	
FW	(Croatia) Antonio Mance	(Germany) Erzgebirge Aue	Recalled from loan	29 January 2022	
MF	(Spain) Diego Barri	(Spain) Badajoz	Free	30 January 2022	
FW	(Albania) Eros Grezda	(Hungary) Zalaegerszeg	Recalled from loan	13 February 2022	
DF	(Croatia) Alen Grgić	(Croatia) Slaven Belupo	Recalled from loan	14 February 2022	
FW	(Croatia) Kristijan Lovrić	(Croatia) Gorica	€2,250,000	15 February 2022	
MF	(Croatia) Darko Nejašmić	(Croatia) Hajduk Split	€1,250,000	6 May 2022	

=== Out ===
Pos	Player	Transferred to	Fee	Date	Source
DF	(Brazil) Guti	Free agent	End of contract	23 May 2021	
MF	(Ukraine) Dmytro Lyopa	Free agent	End of contract	23 May 2021	
FW	(Hungary) Ádám Gyurcsó	Free agent	End of contract	23 May 2021	
FW	(Croatia) Ivan Santini	Free agent	End of contract	23 May 2021	
MF	(Croatia) Josip Vuković	(Croatia) Hajduk Split	Free	22 June 2021	
DF	(Brazil) Talys	(Hungary) Honvéd	Loan	23 June 2021	
FW	(Croatia) Robert Mišković	(Croatia) Istra 1961	Free	30 June 2021	
DF	(Croatia) Filip Mekić	(Croatia) Varaždin	Free	12 July 2021	
FW	(Croatia) Dion Drena Beljo	(Croatia) Istra 1961	Loan	14 July 2021	
DF	(Croatia) Luka Marin	(Croatia) Istra 1961	Free	16 July 2021	
DF	(Brazil) Igor Silva	(France) Lorient	€2,500,000	23 July 2021	
DF	(North Macedonia) Todor Todoroski	(Serbia) Radnički Niš	Free	24 July 2021	
FW	(Albania) Eros Grezda	(Hungary) Zalaegerszeg	Loan	29 July 2021	
FW	(Croatia) Josip Špoljarić	(Hungary) Zalaegerszeg	Loan	29 July 2021	
FW	(Croatia) Antonio Mance	(Germany) Erzgebirge Aue	Loan	25 August 2021	
DF	(Croatia) Alen Grgić	(Croatia) Slaven Belupo	Loan	31 August 2021	
MF	(Moldova) Mihail Caimacov	(Croatia) Slaven Belupo	Free	31 August 2021	
GK	(Croatia) Antonijo Ježina	Free agent	Released	12 October 2021	
MF	(Croatia) Petar Bočkaj	(Croatia) Dinamo Zagreb	€2,700,000	24 December 2021	
MF	(Croatia) Marin Pilj	(Slovenia) Olimpija Ljubljana	Free	29 December 2021	
DF	(Ukraine) Yevhen Cheberko	(Austria) LASK	Return from loan	31 December 2021	
DF	(Brazil) Talys	(Cyprus) Pafos FC	Loan	7 January 2022	
DF	(Bosnia and Herzegovina) Adrian Leon Barišić	(Italy) Frosinone	Loan	8 January 2022	
DF	(Spain) José Antonio Caro	(Spain) UCAM Murcia	Loan	20 January 2022	
FW	(Croatia) Šime Gržan	(Hungary) Zalaegerszeg	Loan	25 January 2022	
FW	(Kosovo) Mirlind Daku	(Slovenia) Mura	Loan	7 February 2022	
FW	(Albania) Eros Grezda	(Croatia) Šibenik	Free	16 February 2022	
MF	(Croatia) Darko Nejašmić	(Croatia) Hajduk Split	Return from loan	6 May 2022	
FW	(Croatia) Ante Erceg	(Denmark) Brøndby	Return from loan	25 May 2022	

▼ Total Spending: €4,650,000

▲ Total Income: €5,200,000

▲ Net Income: €550,000

== Competitions ==
=== Overall record ===
Competition	First match	Last match	Starting round	Final position	Record							
Competition	First match	Last match	Starting round	Final position	Pld	W	D	L	GF	GA	GD	Win %
HT Prva liga	16 July 2021	21 May 2022	Matchday 1	3rd	36	19	12	5	49	29	+20	52.78
Croatian Cup	15 September 2021	9 March 2022	First round	Semi-finals	4	2	1	1	7	3	+4	50.00
UEFA Europa Conference League	22 July 2021	12 August 2021	Second qualifying round	Third qualifying round	4	1	2	1	4	5	−1	25.00
Total					44	22	15	7	60	37	+23	50.00

Last updated: 22 May 2022
Source: Soccerway

=== HT Prva liga ===
==== League table ====
Pos	Team	Pld	W	D	L	GF	GA	GD	Pts	Qualification or relegation
1	Dinamo Zagreb (C)	36	24	7	5	68	22	+46	79	Qualification to Champions League second qualifying round
2	Hajduk Split	36	21	9	6	64	31	+33	72	Qualification to Europa Conference League third qualifying round (Note: The cup winner, Hajduk Split, will enter the third qualifying round of the Europa Conference League.)
3	Osijek	36	19	12	5	49	29	+20	69	Qualification to Europa Conference League second qualifying round
4	Rijeka	36	20	5	11	71	51	+20	65	Qualification to Europa Conference League second qualifying round
5	Lokomotiva	36	12	13	11	55	50	+5	49	

Source: PrvaHNL.hr
Rules for classification: 1) Points; 2) Head-to-head points; 3) Head-to-head goal difference; 4) Head-to-head goals scored (at home if two teams tied); 5) Goal difference; 6) Goals scored; 7) Play-off
(Note: Criteria 2-4 and 7 is only used if deciding champion, teams to international competition or teams for relegation and in that case criteria 6 will not be used).
(C) Champions

==== Results summary ====
Overall								Home						Away					
Pld	W	D	L	GF	GA	GD	Pts	W	D	L	GF	GA	GD	W	D	L	GF	GA	GD
36	19	12	5	49	29	+20	69	11	5	2	26	12	+14	8	7	3	23	17	+6

Last updated: 22 May 2022.
Source: Prva HNL

==== Results by round ====
Round	1	2	3	4	5	6	7	8	9	10	11	12	13	14	15	16	17	18	19	20	21	22	23	24	25	26	27	28	29	30	31	32	33	34	35	36
Ground	H	A	H	A	H	A	H	A	H	A	H	A	H	A	H	A	H	A	H	A	H	A	H	A	H	A	H	A	H	A	H	A	H	A	H	A
Result	W	W	D	W	W	L	L	D	W	W	D	W	W	D	W	D	W	D	W	D	L	W	W	W	W	D	D	W	D	W	W	L	D	L	W	D
Position	1	1	2	1	2	4	5	5	4	4	4	3	3	3	2	1	1	3	1	3	3	3	3	3	1	2	2	2	2	2	2	2	3	3	3	3

Updated to match(es) played on 21 May 2022. Source: Prva HNL
A = Away; H = Home; W = Win; D = Draw; L = Loss

==== Matches ====
16 July 2021 1	Osijek	3–0	Šibenik	Osijek
21:00 CEST (UTC+02:00)	Miloš (yellow card) 26'; Pilj (yellow card) 33'; Miérez 63'; Nejašmić (yellow card) 67'; Bohar 90', 90+5' (pen.)	Report	Jurić (yellow card) 90+1'	Stadium: Gradski Vrt Stadium; Attendance: 551; Referee: Goran Pečarić

25 July 2021 2	Hajduk Split	1–2	Osijek	Split
21:00 CEST (UTC+02:00)	Krovinović (yellow card) 23'; Livaja (yellow card) 24' (goal) 63'; Vušković (yellow card) 39'; Vuković (yellow card) 55'; Atanasov (yellow card) 90+6'	Report	Škorić (yellow card) 11'; Jurčević 66'; Pilj 87'	Stadium: Stadion Poljud; Attendance: 9,486; Referee: Igor Pajač

1 August 2021 3	Osijek	0–0	Slaven Belupo	Osijek
21:00 CEST (UTC+02:00)	Bralić (yellow card) 58'	Report	Krstanović (yellow card) 16'; Marina (yellow card) 42'; Van Bruggen (yellow card) 61'; Paracki (yellow card) 89'	Stadium: Gradski Vrt Stadium; Attendance: 1,016; Referee: Igor Pajač

8 August 2021 4	Hrvatski Dragovoljac	1–2	Osijek	Zagreb
18:55 CEST (UTC+02:00)	Majstorović 55' (pen.); Viduka (yellow card) 74'; Vulikić (yellow card) 87'	Report	Mance 13'; Bralić (yellow card) 32'; Nejašmić 75'	Stadium: Stadion Kranjčevićeva; Attendance: 120; Referee: Dario Kulušić

16 August 2021 5	Osijek	1–0	Rijeka	Osijek
21:00 CEST (UTC+02:00)	Miérez 17'	Report	Vukčević (yellow card) 90+3'	Stadium: Gradski Vrt Stadium; Attendance: 2,069; Referee: Mario Zebec

22 August 2021 6	Istra 1961	2–0	Osijek	Pula
18:55 CEST (UTC+02:00)	Blagojević (yellow card) 43'; Beljo (yellow card) 53'; Bandé 83'; Mišković 90+4'	Report	Bohar (yellow card) 36'; Nejašmić (yellow card) 61'	Stadium: Stadion Aldo Drosina; Attendance: 621; Referee: Ivan Bebek

29 August 2021 7	Osijek	0–2	Dinamo Zagreb	Osijek
18:55 CEST (UTC+02:00)	Miloš (yellow card) 31'; Škorić (yellow card) 59'	Report	Jakić 33'; Šutalo (yellow card) 58'; Ristovski (yellow card) 59'; Ivušić 65' (o.g.); Tolić (yellow card) 68'	Stadium: Gradski Vrt Stadium; Attendance: 3,175; Referee: Ivan Bebek

12 September 2021 8	Lokomotiva	1–1	Osijek	Zagreb
19:05 CEST (UTC+02:00)	Nevistić (yellow card) 40'; Kačavenda (yellow card) 62'; Dabro 70'	Report	Miérez (yellow card) 35'; Fiolić (yellow card) 36' (yellow-red card) 75'; Topčagić (yellow card) 82' (goal) 90+2'; Škorić (yellow card) 85'; Nejašmić (yellow card) 86'	Stadium: Stadion Kranjčevićeva; Attendance: 491; Referee: Mario Zebec

19 September 2021 9	Osijek	3–2	Gorica	Osijek
19:05 CEST (UTC+02:00)	Cheberko (yellow card) 45+1'; Daku 75', 84' (yellow card) 90+4'; Bartolec (yellow card) 79'; Lončar 90+3' (yellow card) 90+3'	Report	Kalik 30' (yellow card) 52'; Jovičić (yellow card) 44'; Krizmanić (yellow card) 75'; Brodić 80'; Šroler (yellow card) 83'; Babec (yellow card) 90+4'	Stadium: Gradski Vrt Stadium; Attendance: 1,361; Referee: Fran Jović

25 September 2021 10	Šibenik	0–2	Osijek	Šibenik
19:05 CEST (UTC+02:00)	A. Jakoliš (yellow card) 90+3'	Report	Fiolić 18'; Topčagić (yellow card) 29'; Bartolec (yellow card) 59'; Žaper 82'; Nejašmić (yellow card) 87'	Stadium: Stadion Šubićevac; Attendance: 746; Referee: Ante Čuljak

3 October 2021 11	Osijek	1–1	Hajduk Split	Osijek
19:30 CEST (UTC+02:00)	Kleinheisler 10'; Hiroš (yellow card) 41'; Jugović (yellow card) 66'; Žaper (yellow card) 85'	Report	Lončar 19' (o.g.); Livaja (yellow card) 66'	Stadium: Gradski Vrt Stadium; Attendance: 5,118; Referee: Igor Pajač

17 October 2021 12	Slaven Belupo	0–2	Osijek	Koprivnica
15:00 CEST (UTC+02:00)	Bogojević (yellow card) 36'; Caimacov (yellow card) 37'; Zirdum (yellow card) 78'	Report	Bočkaj (yellow card) 17'; Hiroš 22'; Nejašmić 45'; Škorić (yellow card) 86'	Stadium: Gradski stadion Attendance: 467; Referee: Duje Strukan

23 October 2021 13	Osijek	1–0	Hrvatski Dragovoljac	Osijek
15:00 CEST (UTC+02:00)	Žaper 71'; Bočkaj (yellow card) 88'; Daku (yellow card) 90+3'	Report	Bagadur (yellow card) 19'; Majstorović (yellow card) 36'; Vulikić (yellow card) 50'; Perić (yellow card) 57'	Stadium: Gradski Vrt Stadium; Attendance: 1,311; Referee: Jakov Titlić

6 November 2021 15	Osijek	3–0	Istra 1961	Osijek
15:00 CET (UTC+01:00)	Žaper 5'; Topčagić 59'; Fiolić 75'	Report	Mlinar (yellow card) 8'; Mahmoud (yellow card) 17'; Perera (yellow card) 51'; Mišković (yellow card) 68'	Stadium: Gradski Vrt Stadium; Attendance: 1,177; Referee: Mario Zebec

20 November 2021 16	Dinamo Zagreb	1–1	Osijek	Zagreb
15:00 CET (UTC+01:00)	Petković 80'	Report	Fiolić 16'; Miérez (yellow card) 79'; Lončar (yellow card) 90+3'	Stadium: Stadion Maksimir; Attendance: 2,501; Referee: Duje Strukan

26 November 2021 17	Osijek	3–1	Lokomotiva	Osijek
18:00 CET (UTC+01:00)	Bartolec (yellow card) 39'; Nejašmić 40'; Fiolić (yellow card) 51' (goal) 90+6'; Jugović (yellow card) 57'; Miérez (yellow card) 70'; Bočkaj (yellow card) 76'; Daku 86'	Report	Kulenović 9'; Aliyu (yellow card) 12' (yellow-red card) 72'; Marić (yellow card) 37'; Çokaj (yellow card) 58' (yellow-red card) 90+3'; Soldo (yellow card) 76'	Stadium: Gradski Vrt Stadium; Attendance: 1,083; Referee: Igor Pajač

4 December 2021 18	Gorica	1–1	Osijek	Velika Gorica
13:00 CET (UTC+01:00)	Pršir 6'; Šimunović (yellow card) 15'; Lovrić (yellow card) 41'; Kalik (yellow card) 82'	Report	Hiroš (yellow card) 9' (goal) 45+3'; Jurčević (yellow card) 39'; Kleinheisler (yellow card) 47' (yellow-red card) 61'; Jugović (yellow card) 49'; Nejašmić (yellow card) 56'; Lončar (yellow card) 74'	Stadium: Stadion Radnik; Attendance: 673; Referee: Goran Pečarić

8 December 2021 14	Rijeka	0–0	Osijek	Rijeka
17:00 CET (UTC+01:00)	Drmić (yellow card) 18'; Abass (yellow card) 43'	Report	Škorić (yellow card) 18'; Topčagić (yellow card) 24'; Fiolić (yellow card) 25'	Stadium: Stadion Rujevica; Attendance: 3,631; Referee: Dario Kulušić

12 December 2021 19	Osijek	3–1	Šibenik	Osijek
13:00 CET (UTC+01:00)	Miérez 3'; Bohar 6'; Lončar (yellow card) 13'; Kleinheisler 33'; Hiroš (yellow card) 55'	Report	Marin 7'; Mina (yellow card) 53'; Ćurić (yellow card) 90+1'	Stadium: Gradski Vrt Stadium; Attendance: 1,027; Referee: Ivana Martinčić

19 December 2021 20	Hajduk Split	0–0	Osijek	Split
17:30 CET (UTC+01:00)	Kalinić (yellow card) 21'; Lovrencsics (yellow card) 60'	Report	Miloš (yellow card) 21'; Cheberko (yellow card) 27'; Bohar (yellow card) 45'; Pilj (yellow card) 90+6'	Stadium: Stadion Poljud; Attendance: 30,524; Referee: Fran Jović

29 January 2022 21	Osijek	1–2	Slaven Belupo	Osijek
15:00 CET (UTC+01:00)	Caktaš 74' (yellow card) 90+5'; Leovac (yellow card) 77'	Report	Zvonarek 49'; Božić 68'; Brković (yellow card) 72'; Zapata (yellow card) 90+2'; Crnac (yellow card) 90+5'	Stadium: Gradski Vrt Stadium; Attendance: 2,072; Referee: Duje Strukan

6 February 2022 22	Hrvatski Dragovoljac	1–3	Osijek	Zagreb
15:00 CET (UTC+01:00)	Karrica 8'; Frigan (yellow card) 54'; Vulikić (yellow card) 84'	Report	Galešić 29' (o.g.); Bohar 54' (pen.); Lončar (yellow card) 60'; Caktaš 81'	Stadium: Stadion Kranjčevićeva; Attendance: 300; Referee: Dario Kulušić

13 February 2022 23	Osijek	1–0	Rijeka	Osijek
17:30 CET (UTC+01:00)	Fiolić (yellow card) 16'; Čestić 85' (o.g.); Brlek (yellow card) 89'	Report	Čestić (yellow card) 29'; Drmić (yellow card) 48'; Issah (yellow card) 87' (yellow-red card) 90+3'	Stadium: Gradski Vrt Stadium; Attendance: 3,406; Referee: Fran Jović

19 February 2022 24	Istra 1961	2–3	Osijek	Pula
17:05 CET (UTC+01:00)	Silva (yellow card) 55'; Beljo 57'; Galilea 84'	Report	Caktaš 27'; Marin 40' (o.g.); Jurčević (yellow card) 45'; Miérez (yellow card) 50'; Cheberko (yellow card) 79'; Žaper (yellow card) 89'; Mance 90+5'	Stadium: Stadion Aldo Drosina; Attendance: 762; Referee: Duje Strukan

27 February 2022 25	Osijek	1–0	Dinamo Zagreb	Osijek
18:00 CET (UTC+01:00)	Bralić (yellow card) 43'; Mance 77'	Report	Gojak (yellow card) 89'	Stadium: Gradski Vrt Stadium; Attendance: 6,676; Referee: Igor Pajač

4 March 2022 26	Lokomotiva	0–0	Osijek	Zagreb
18:00 CET (UTC+01:00)	Mersinaj (yellow card) 85'	Report	Škorić (yellow card) 31'	Stadium: Stadion Kranjčevićeva; Attendance: 884; Referee: Mario Zebec

13 March 2022 27	Osijek	0–0	Gorica	Osijek
17:05 CET (UTC+01:00)	Lovrić (yellow card) 4'; Grgić (yellow card) 56'; Miérez (yellow card) 71'; Ivušić (yellow card) 86'; Lončar (yellow card) 90'; Kleinheisler (yellow card) 90+3'	Report	Muhammed (yellow card) 38'; Atiemwen (yellow card) 45+1'; Da Cruz (yellow card) 63'; Golubickas (yellow card) 77'	Stadium: Gradski Vrt Stadium; Attendance: 2,856; Referee: Ante Čuljak

20 March 2022 28	Šibenik	0–3	Osijek	Šibenik
17:05 CET (UTC+01:00)	Mina (yellow card) 17'; Asanović (yellow card) 59'	Report	Lovrić 54' (yellow card) 75'; Leovac (yellow card) 64'; Marin 70' (o.g.); Topčagić 78'	Stadium: Stadion Šubićevac; Attendance: 667; Referee: Duje Strukan

3 April 2022 29	Osijek	0–0	Hajduk Split	Osijek
19:30 CEST (UTC+02:00)	Lovrić (yellow card) 6'; Miérez (yellow card) 34'; Caktaš (yellow card) 55'; Cheberko (yellow card) 80'; Žaper (yellow card) 90+3'	Report	Ferro (yellow card) 32'; Livaja (yellow card) 45+6'	Stadium: Gradski Vrt Stadium; Attendance: 7,181; Referee: Fran Jović

10 April 2022 30	Slaven Belupo	0–1	Osijek	Koprivnica
17:00 CEST (UTC+02:00)	Tepšić (yellow card) 60'; Marina (yellow card) 75'; Krstanović (yellow card) 76'	Report	Fiolić (yellow card) 9'; Caktaš 33' (yellow card) 69'	Stadium: Gradski stadion Attendance: 669; Referee: Igor Pajač

16 April 2022 31	Osijek	2–1	Hrvatski Dragovoljac	Osijek
17:05 CEST (UTC+02:00)	Žaper 3'; Bralić (yellow card) 19'; Topčagić 45+2'	Report	Galešić 32'; Markovina (yellow card) 39'; Brtan (yellow card) 51'; Bristrić (yellow card) 64'; Karrica (yellow card) 90+3'	Stadium: Gradski Vrt Stadium; Attendance: 4,371; Referee: Jakov Titlić

23 April 2022 32	Rijeka	3–1	Osijek	Rijeka
20:00 CEST (UTC+02:00)	Murić 19' (pen.); Velkovski (yellow card) 32'; Vučkić 36'; Drmić 48'	Report	Kleinheisler (yellow card) 56'; Mance 65'	Stadium: Stadion Rujevica; Attendance: 4,516; Referee: Mario Zebec

1 May 2022 33	Osijek	2–2	Istra 1961	Osijek
17:00 CEST (UTC+02:00)	Lovrić 4' (yellow card) 71'; Caktaš 12' (yellow card) 17'; Bralić (yellow card) 45+3'	Report	Perković 18'; Galilea 39' (yellow card) 71'; Beljo (yellow card) 45+3'; Cáseres (yellow card) 53'; Rovis (yellow card) 64'; Hujber (yellow card) 82'; Mlinar (yellow card) 84'; Collao (yellow card) 90+1'	Stadium: Gradski Vrt Stadium; Attendance: 2,668; Referee: Duje Strukan

8 May 2022 34	Dinamo Zagreb	3–0	Osijek	Zagreb
20:00 CEST (UTC+02:00)	Oršić 35'; Špikić 60'; Mišić (yellow card) 65'; Menalo 81'	Report	Cheberko (yellow card) 15' (yellow-red card) 44'; Lončar (yellow card) 45'; Fućak (yellow card) 89'	Stadium: Stadion Maksimir; Attendance: 13,901; Referee: Igor Pajač

15 May 2022 35	Osijek	1–0	Lokomotiva	Osijek
17:00 CEST (UTC+02:00)	Žaper 25'; Brlek (yellow card) 42'; Jurčević (yellow card) 53'; Bralić (yellow card) 90+3'	Report	Çokaj (yellow card) 48'; Kulenović (yellow card) 52'; Kačavenda (yellow card) 78'; Vranjković (yellow card) 78'; Soldo (yellow card) 87'	Stadium: Gradski Vrt Stadium; Attendance: 2,638; Referee: Duje Strukan

21 May 2022 36	Gorica	1–1	Osijek	Velika Gorica
17:05 CEST (UTC+02:00)	Šimunović (yellow card) 14'; Jovičić 30'; Keita (yellow card) 46'	Report	Bartolec 68'; Lovrić (red card) 82'	Stadium: Stadion Radnik; Attendance: 895; Referee: Ante Čulina

=== Croatian Cup ===
15 September 2021 First round	Bednja	0–3	Osijek	Beletinec
16:00 CEST (UTC+02:00)	Puškadija (yellow card) 82'	Report	Cheberko 3'; Bočkaj 30'; Daku 77'; Malenica (red card) 89'	Stadium: Kod mosta Attendance: 1,500; Referee: Ante Čuljak

26 October 2021 Second round	Rudeš	0–2	Osijek	Zagreb
13:00 CEST (UTC+02:00)	Srbljinović (yellow card) 48'; Marković (yellow card) 66'	Report	Lončar (yellow card) 19'; Fiolić 55'; Cheberko (yellow card) 62'; Žaper (yellow card) 65'; Miérez 71'	Stadium: ŠC Rudeš; Attendance: 1,000; Referee: Jakov Titlić

1 December 2021 Quarter-finals	Osijek	0–0 (a.e.t.) (5–4 p)	Slaven Belupo	Osijek
16:00 CET (UTC+01:00)	Škorić (yellow card) 70'; Lončar (yellow card) 88'; Miloš (yellow card) 90+4'; Žaper (red card) 94'; Daku (yellow card) 114'; Topčagić (yellow card) 120'	Report	Božić (yellow card) 39'; Goda (yellow card) 45+1'; Marina (yellow card) 83'; Caimacov (yellow card) 93'; Kvržić (yellow card) 105' (yellow-red card) 108'; Zirdum (yellow card) 107'	Stadium: Gradski Vrt Stadium; Attendance: 1,171; Referee: Fran Jović
	Penalties
	Brlek (penalty scored); Jugović (penalty scored); Škorić (penalty missed); Lončar (penalty scored); Fiolić (penalty scored); Daku (penalty scored)		Krstanović (penalty scored); Paracki (penalty scored); Glavčić (penalty scored); Goda (penalty missed); Marina (penalty scored); Zirdum (penalty missed)

9 March 2022 Semi-finals	Rijeka	3–2 (a.e.t.)	Osijek	Rijeka
18:00 CET (UTC+01:00)	Krešić 20'; Drmić (yellow card) 38' (goal) 76'; Selahi (yellow card) 68'; Ampem (yellow card) 105'; Čestić (yellow card) 111'; Merkulov 118'	Report	Fiolić (yellow card) 21'; Caktaš 42'; Leovac (yellow card) 65'; Kleinheisler (yellow card) 68'; Mance 90+2' (yellow card) 90+5'; Hiroš (yellow card) 107'; Žaper (yellow card) 107'; Fućak (yellow card) 111'	Stadium: Stadion Rujevica; Attendance: 7,225; Referee: Duje Strukan

=== UEFA Europa Conference League ===
==== Second qualifying round ====
22 July 2021 First leg	Pogoń Szczecin (Poland)	0–0	(Croatia) Osijek	Szczecin, Poland
21:00 CEST (UTC+02:00)	Kurzawa (yellow card) 57'	Report	Hiroš (yellow card) 85'	Stadium: Stadion im. Floriana Krygiera; Attendance: 6,615; Referee: Horațiu Feșnic (Romania)

29 July 2021 Second leg	Osijek (Croatia)	1–0 (1–0 agg.)	(Poland) Pogoń Szczecin	Osijek, Croatia
21:00 CEST (UTC+02:00)	Jurčević (yellow card) 39'; Kleinheisler 44'; Škorić (yellow card) 84'; Fiolić (yellow card) 87'	Report	Zech (yellow card) 35'; Drygas (yellow card) 90+2'; Stolarski (yellow card) 90+4'	Stadium: Gradski Vrt Stadium; Attendance: 3,816; Referee: Luis Godinho (Portugal)

==== Third qualifying round ====
5 August 2021 First leg	CSKA Sofia (Bulgaria)	4–2	(Croatia) Osijek	Sofia, Bulgaria
19:00 CEST (UTC+02:00)	Mazikou 30'; Carey 39'; Caicedo 42'; Yomov 74'	Report	Žaper (yellow card) 30'; Mattheij 41' (o.g.); Topčagić 90+3'	Stadium: Vasil Levski National Stadium; Attendance: 4,494; Referee: Donatas Rumšas (Lithuania)

12 August 2021 Second leg	Osijek (Croatia)	1–1 (3–5 agg.)	(Bulgaria) CSKA Sofia	Osijek, Croatia
21:15 CEST (UTC+02:00)	Škorić 45' (yellow card) 84'; Miérez (yellow card) 48'; Lončar (red card) 86'	Report	Carey 33'; Busatto (yellow card) 54'; Geferson (yellow card) 76'; Wildschut (yellow card) 77'; Turitsov (yellow card) 83'; Youga (yellow card) 84'	Stadium: Gradski Vrt Stadium; Attendance: 3,706; Referee: Donald Robertson (Scotland)

=== Friendlies ===
==== Pre-season ====
19 June 2021 Friendly	Osijek	4–0	Čepin	Osijek
10:00 CEST (UTC+02:00)	Bočkaj 4'; Mance 10' 30'; Špoljarić 77'	Report		Stadium: Gradski Vrt Stadium; Attendance: 0

24 June 2021 Friendly	Polet Sveti Martin na Muri	2–4	Osijek	Sveti Martin na Muri
18:00 CEST (UTC+02:00)	Brezovec 31' (pen.); Nejašmić 52' (o.g.)	Report	Bohar 34'; Bočkaj 40'; Beljo 76' 88'	Stadium: NK POLET (SMnM); Attendance: 350

26 June 2021 Friendly	Osijek (Croatia)	1–2	(Poland) Śląsk Wrocław	Sveti Martin na Muri, Croatia
11:00 CEST (UTC+02:00)	Miérez 9'	Report	Lewkot (yellow card) 48'; Musonda 68'; Pich 80'	Stadium: NK POLET (SMnM); Attendance: 50; Referee: Igor Križarić

1 July 2021 Friendly	Osijek (Croatia)	1–1	(Hungary) Fehérvár	Sveti Martin na Muri, Croatia
18:00 CEST (UTC+02:00)	Bočkaj 52'; Miloš (yellow card) 89'	Report	Zivzivadze 64'	Stadium: NK POLET (SMnM)

3 July 2021 Friendly	Osijek (Croatia)	0–0	(Hungary) Zalaegerszeg	Sveti Martin na Muri, Croatia
11:00 CEST (UTC+02:00)		Report		Stadium: NK POLET (SMnM)

10 July 2021 Friendly	Osijek (Croatia)	3–0	(Serbia) TSC Bačka Topola	Osijek, Croatia
18:00 CEST (UTC+02:00)	Miérez 52'; Bohar 57'; Mance 90'	Report		Stadium: Gradski Vrt Stadium; Attendance: 800

==== On-season (2021) ====
8 October 2021 Friendly	Vukovar 1991	1–4	Osijek	Borovo Naselje
13:30 CEST (UTC+02:00)	Barišić 50' (yellow card) 55'	Report	Topčagić 22', 39'; Pilj 42'; Gržan 88'	Stadium: Gradski stadion Borovo Naselje

20 October 2021 Friendly	Osijek	2–2	Vukovar 1991	Osijek
15:00 CEST (UTC+02:00)	Bralić 82'; Cheberko 84'	Report	Tustonjić 29'; Barišić 38'	Stadium: Gradski Vrt Stadium

12 November 2021 Friendly	Osijek (Croatia)	2–0	(Hungary) Szentlőrinc	Osijek, Croatia
12:30 CET (UTC+01:00)	Miérez 14'; Gonzalez 48'	Report		Stadium: Gradski Vrt Stadium

==== Mid-season ====
8 January 2022 Friendly	Osijek	2–0	BSK Bijelo Brdo	Osijek
12:00 CET (UTC+01:00)	Fućak 64'; Bralić 86'	Report		Stadium: Gradski Vrt Stadium; Attendance: 300

15 January 2022 Friendly	Osijek (Croatia)	2–0	(Slovenia) Olimpija Ljubljana	Poreč, Croatia
14:00 CET (UTC+01:00)	Bohar 4' (pen.); Bartolec 17'; Daku 62'	Report		Stadium: Zelena Laguna Football camp Referee: Marin Vidulin

20 January 2022 Friendly	Osijek (Croatia)	3–1	(Hungary) Haladás	Poreč, Croatia
15:00 CET (UTC+01:00)	Topčagić 28'; Miloš (yellow card) 44'; Mikolčić 45+2'; Fućak 54'	Report	Kállai (yellow card) 25'; Bošnjak (yellow card) 44'; Németh 59'	Stadium: Zelena Laguna Football camp Referee: Amel Dizdarević

22 January 2022 Friendly	Osijek (Croatia)	3–0	(Slovenia) Tabor Sežana	Poreč, Croatia
11:00 CET (UTC+01:00)	Fiolić 13', 80'; Brlek 42'	Report	Stančič (yellow card) 19'	Stadium: Zelena Laguna Football camp

==== On-season (2022) ====
9 February 2022 Friendly	Osijek	3–0	Belišće	Osijek
15:00 CET (UTC+01:00)	Topčagić 3'; Caktaš 44'; Leovac 58'	Report		Stadium: Gradski Vrt Stadium

22 February 2022 Friendly	Osijek	3–2	Zrinski Jurjevac	Osijek
17:00 CET (UTC+01:00)	Fiolić 54', 90'; Mance 78'	Report	Moises 82'; Ulm 86'	Stadium: Gradski Vrt Stadium

25 March 2022 Friendly	Osijek	5–0	Cibalia	Grabovac
11:00 CET (UTC+01:00)	Kleinheisler 23'; Fiolić 26'; Caktaš 58'; Jugović 67'; Petković 78'	Report		Stadium: Franjo Dušić - Tetek; Attendance: Behind closed doors

== Player seasonal records ==
Updated 22 May 2022

=== Goals ===
Rank	Name	League	Europe	Cup	Total
1	(Croatia) Mijo Caktaš	5	–	1	6
2	(Croatia) Mihael Žaper	5	–	–	5
2	(Austria) Mihret Topčagić	4	1	–	5
2	(Croatia) Ivan Fiolić	4	–	1	5
2	(Croatia) Antonio Mance	4	–	1	5
6	(Slovenia) Damjan Bohar	4	–	–	4
6	(Kosovo) Mirlind Daku	3	–	1	4
6	(Argentina) Ramón Miérez	3	–	1	4
9	(Croatia) Darko Nejašmić	3	–	–	3
9	(Hungary) László Kleinheisler	2	1	–	3
11	(Bosnia and Herzegovina) Amer Hiroš	2	–	–	2
11	(Croatia) Kristijan Lovrić	2	–	–	2
13	(Croatia) Karlo Bartolec	1	–	–	1
13	(Slovenia) Mario Jurčević	1	–	–	1
13	(Germany) Danijel Lončar	1	–	–	1
13	(Croatia) Marin Pilj	1	–	–	1
13	(Croatia) Mile Škorić	–	1	–	1
13	(Croatia) Petar Bočkaj	–	–	1	1
13	(Ukraine) Yevhen Cheberko	–	–	1	1
Own goals		4	1	–	5
TOTALS		49	4	7	60

Source: Competitive matches

=== Clean sheets ===
Rank	Name	League	Europe	Cup	Total
1	(Croatia) Ivica Ivušić	12	2	–	14
2	(Croatia) Marko Malenica	5	–	2	7
3	(Croatia) Marko Barešić	–	–	1	1
3	(Argentina) Ramón Miérez	–	–	1	1
TOTALS		17	2	4	23

Source: Competitive matches

=== Disciplinary record ===
Number	Position	Player	1. HNL			Europe			Croatian Cup			Total		
Number	Position	Player	Yellow card	(yellow card) (yellow-red card)	Red card	Yellow card	(yellow card) (yellow-red card)	Red card	Yellow card	(yellow card) (yellow-red card)	Red card	Yellow card	(yellow card) (yellow-red card)	Red card
1	GK	(Croatia) Ivica Ivušić	1	0	0	0	0	0	0	0	0	1	0	0
2	DF	(Croatia) Karlo Bartolec	3	0	0	0	0	0	0	0	0	3	0	0
4	DF	(Croatia) Marin Leovac	2	0	0	0	0	0	1	0	0	3	0	0
5	MF	(Hungary) László Kleinheisler	2	1	0	0	0	0	1	0	0	3	1	0
6	MF	(Croatia) Darko Nejašmić	5	0	0	0	0	0	0	0	0	5	0	0
7	MF	(Croatia) Vedran Jugović	3	0	0	0	0	0	0	0	0	3	0	0
10	MF	(Bosnia and Herzegovina) Amer Hiroš	3	0	0	1	0	0	1	0	0	5	0	0
11	MF	(Croatia) Mijo Caktaš	4	0	0	0	0	0	0	0	0	4	0	0
12	MF	(Croatia) Petar Bočkaj	3	0	0	0	0	0	0	0	0	3	0	0
13	FW	(Argentina) Ramón Miérez	6	0	0	1	0	0	0	0	0	7	0	0
14	MF	(Croatia) Ivan Fiolić	4	1	0	1	0	0	1	0	0	6	1	0
19	MF	(Croatia) Mihael Žaper	3	0	0	1	0	0	2	0	1	6	0	1
20	DF	(Slovenia) Mario Jurčević	3	0	0	1	0	0	0	0	0	4	0	0
21	DF	(Croatia) Mile Škorić	6	0	0	2	0	0	1	0	0	9	0	0
22	DF	(Croatia) Danijel Lončar	7	0	0	0	0	1	2	0	0	9	0	1
23	MF	(Croatia) Petar Brlek	2	0	0	0	0	0	0	0	0	2	0	0
25	MF	(Croatia) Marin Pilj	2	0	0	0	0	0	0	0	0	2	0	0
26	FW	(Kosovo) Mirlind Daku	2	0	0	0	0	0	1	0	0	3	0	0
28	DF	(Croatia) Slavko Bralić	6	0	0	0	0	0	0	0	0	6	0	0
29	FW	(Croatia) Kristian Fućak	1	0	0	0	0	0	1	0	0	2	0	0
30	FW	(Austria) Mihret Topčagić	3	0	0	0	0	0	1	0	0	4	0	0
31	GK	(Croatia) Marko Malenica	0	0	0	0	0	0	0	0	1	0	0	1
32	DF	(Croatia) Alen Grgić	1	0	0	0	0	0	0	0	0	1	0	0
39	FW	(Slovenia) Damjan Bohar	2	0	0	0	0	0	0	0	0	2	0	0
44	FW	(Croatia) Kristijan Lovrić	4	0	1	0	0	0	0	0	0	4	0	1
77	DF	(Croatia) Mato Miloš	3	0	0	0	0	0	1	0	0	4	0	0
95	FW	(Croatia) Antonio Mance	0	0	0	0	0	0	1	0	0	1	0	0
98	DF	(Ukraine) Yevhen Cheberko	4	1	0	0	0	0	1	0	0	5	1	0
TOTALS			85	3	1	7	0	1	15	0	2	107	3	4

=== Appearances and goals ===
Number	Position	Player	Apps	Goals	Apps	Goals	Apps	Goals	Apps	Goals
Number	Position	Player	Total		1. HNL (Note: First number represents appearances in starting eleven, while the second number indicates a substitute appearance.)		Conference League		Croatian Cup	
1	GK	(Croatia) Ivica Ivušić	31	0	26+0	0	4+0	0	1+0	0
2	DF	(Croatia) Karlo Bartolec	16	1	13+2	1	0+0	0	1+0	0
4	DF	(Croatia) Marin Leovac	7	0	4+2	0	0+0	0	1+0	0
5	MF	(Hungary) László Kleinheisler	37	3	22+8	2	4+0	1	3+0	0
6	MF	(Croatia) Darko Nejašmić	32	3	23+4	3	1+2	0	2+0	0
7	MF	(Croatia) Vedran Jugović	24	0	10+8	0	3+0	0	0+3	0
8	MF	(Republic of the Congo) Merveil Ndockyt	10	0	2+5	0	0+1	0	2+0	0
9	FW	(Croatia) Ante Erceg	3	0	0+3	0	0+0	0	0+0	0
10	MF	(Bosnia and Herzegovina) Amer Hiroš	34	2	12+14	2	0+4	0	2+2	0
11	MF	(Croatia) Mijo Caktaš	14	6	11+2	5	0+0	0	1+0	1
12	FW	(Croatia) Petar Bočkaj	24	1	14+4	0	2+1	0	2+1	1
13	FW	(Argentina) Ramón Miérez	36	4	21+7	3	4+0	0	3+1	1
14	MF	(Croatia) Ivan Fiolić	30	5	21+4	4	1+1	0	3+0	1
15	GK	(Croatia) Marko Barešić	1	0	0+0	0	0+0	0	1+0	0
18	DF	(Spain) José Antonio Caro	1	0	0+0	0	0+0	0	0+1	0
18	MF	(Spain) Diego Barri	2	0	1+1	0	0+0	0	0+0	0
19	MF	(Croatia) Mihael Žaper	35	5	25+3	5	3+0	0	4+0	0
20	DF	(Slovenia) Mario Jurčević	20	1	13+4	1	3+0	0	0+0	0
21	DF	(Croatia) Mile Škorić	33	1	26+0	0	4+0	1	3+0	0
22	DF	(Germany) Danijel Lončar	39	1	31+1	1	4+0	0	3+0	0
23	MF	(Croatia) Petar Brlek	18	0	6+11	0	0+0	0	0+1	0
25	MF	(Croatia) Marin Pilj	20	1	2+13	1	1+2	0	1+1	0
26	FW	(Kosovo) Mirlind Daku	16	4	1+11	3	0+1	0	0+3	1
27	DF	(Bosnia and Herzegovina) Adrian Leon Barišić	2	0	0+1	0	0+0	0	1+0	0
27	FW	(Croatia) Vinko Petković	1	0	0+1	0	0+0	0	0+0	0
28	DF	(Croatia) Slavko Bralić	17	0	12+4	0	0+0	0	1+0	0
29	FW	(Croatia) Kristian Fućak	14	0	6+7	0	0+0	0	0+1	0
30	FW	(Austria) Mihret Topčagić	28	5	12+12	4	0+1	1	2+1	0
31	GK	(Croatia) Marko Malenica	12	0	10+0	0	0+0	0	2+0	0
32	DF	(Croatia) Alen Grgić	10	0	9+0	0	0+0	0	1+0	0
34	DF	(Croatia) Ivan Cvijanović	1	0	0+1	0	0+0	0	0+0	0
37	FW	(Croatia) Šime Gržan	14	0	6+7	0	0+1	0	0+0	0
39	FW	(Slovenia) Damjan Bohar	30	4	12+10	4	3+1	0	0+4	0
44	FW	(Croatia) Kristijan Lovrić	12	2	10+1	2	0+0	0	0+1	0
77	DF	(Croatia) Mato Miloš	28	0	15+7	0	4+0	0	1+1	0
95	FW	(Croatia) Antonio Mance	21	5	5+12	4	1+2	0	0+1	1
98	DF	(Ukraine) Yevhen Cheberko	25	1	15+4	0	2+1	0	3+0	1
