= 2020–21 NK Slaven Belupo season =

NK Slaven Belupo
2020–21 season
- Chairman: Hrvoje Kolarić
- Head coach: Tomislav Stipić (until 10 June 2021)
- Stadium: Gradski stadion
- Prva HNL: 7th
- Croatian Cup: Quarter-finals
- Top goalscorer: League: Nemanja Glavčić (1); All: Nemanja Glavčić (1)
- All statistics correct as of 22 August 2020.

The 2020–21 NK Slaven Belupo season is the club's 114th season in existence and the 13th consecutive season in the top flight of Croatian football. In addition to the domestic league, Slaven Belupo will participate in this season's edition of the Croatian Cup. The season covers the period from 1 July 2020 to 30 June 2021.

== Players ==
=== First-team squad ===
As of 18 August 2020

Note: Flags indicate national team as defined under FIFA eligibility rules; some limited exceptions apply. Players may hold more than one non-FIFA nationality.

| No. | Pos. | Nation | Player |
|---|---|---|---|
| 1 | GK | CRO | Ivan Filipović |
| 2 | DF | CRO | Matko Zirdum |
| 3 | DF | CRO | Bruno Čovo |
| 4 | DF | CRO | Frane Maglica |
| 5 | DF | NED | Damian van Bruggen |
| 6 | DF | CRO | Tomislav Božić |
| 7 | DF | CRO | Bruno Goda |
| 8 | MF | CRO | Frano Mlinar |
| 9 | FW | CMR | Franck Etoundi |
| 10 | MF | CRO | Stipe Bačelić-Grgić |
| 11 | MF | SRB | Nemanja Glavčić |
| 12 | GK | CRO | Ivan Čović |

| No. | Pos. | Nation | Playerhttps://nk-slaven-belupo.hr/ |
|---|---|---|---|
| 13 | MF | CRO | Marko Čovo |
| 15 | MF | CRO | Goran Paracki |
| 18 | MF | CRO | Arijan Brković |
| 19 | FW | GER | Törles Knöll |
| 20 | DF | CRO | Franjo Prce |
| 22 | DF | CRO | Vinko Soldo (on loan from Dinamo Zagreb) |
| 25 | GK | CRO | Karlo Slukić |
| 26 | MF | CRO | Karlo Lulić |
| 29 | FW | ITA | Martin Boakye |
| 30 | FW | CRO | Bruno Bogojević |
| 99 | FW | CRO | Ivan Krstanović |

=== Out on loan ===
Note: Flags indicate national team as defined under FIFA eligibility rules; some limited exceptions apply. Players may hold more than one non-FIFA nationality.

| No. | Pos. | Nation | Player |
|---|---|---|---|
| 26 | DF | CRO | Ante Vrljičak (at Bravo until 15 June 2020) |
| 97 | FW | KOS | Festim Alidema (at Hrvatski Dragovoljac until 30 June 2020) |

| No. | Pos. | Nation | Player |
|---|---|---|---|
| — | DF | CRO | Zvonimir Šarlija (at Kasımpaşa until 30 June 2020) |

== Competitions ==
=== Overview ===
Slaven Belupo started the season with a batch of mixed results, drawing 5 out of their 7 opening games. Their first win came on 16 October 2020 on matchday 8, with a scoreline of 5:1 against Istra 1961. Slaven Belupo stopped drawing games until the winter break, winning 4 out of 12 games. After the winter break, Slaven Belupo yet again entered drawing form, drawing 8 out of 14 games. After that, they stopped drawing again and lost 5 games in a row, coming closer to the relegation zone. Before the final matchday, Slaven Belupo were only 3 points above the relegation zone. Despite the concerns, Slaven Belupo survived with a dramatic goal from Lovro Zvonarek, ensuring a 1:0 victory over relegation rivals NK Varaždin. Despite the survival and a 7th place finish, Tomislav Stipić was sacked on 10 June 2021 after just 2 wins after the winter break.

| Competition | First match | Last match | Starting round | Record | | | | | | | |
| Competition | First match | Last match | Starting round | Pld | W | D | L | GF | GA | GD | Win % |
|---|---|---|---|---|---|---|---|---|---|---|---|
| HT Prva liga | 15 August 2020 | 15 May 2021 | Matchday 1 | 36 | 7 | 13 | 16 | 36 | 53 | −17 | 19.44 |
| Croatian Cup | 7 October 2020 | 3 March 2021 | First round | 3 | 2 | 0 | 1 | 13 | 3 | +10 | 66.67 |
| Total | | | | 39 | 9 | 13 | 17 | 49 | 56 | −7 | 23.08 |

Last updated: 19 December 2021
Source: Soccerway

=== HT Prva liga ===
==== League table ====
| Pos | Team | Pld | W | D | L | GF | GA | GD | Pts |
|---|---|---|---|---|---|---|---|---|---|
| 5 | Gorica | 36 | 17 | 8 | 11 | 60 | 47 | +13 | 59 |
| 6 | Šibenik | 36 | 9 | 8 | 19 | 32 | 47 | −15 | 35 |
| 7 | Slaven Belupo | 36 | 7 | 13 | 16 | 36 | 53 | −17 | 34 |
| 8 | Lokomotiva | 36 | 7 | 9 | 20 | 29 | 60 | −31 | 30 |
| 9 | Istra 1961 | 36 | 7 | 8 | 21 | 27 | 52 | −25 | 29 |

Source: PrvaHNL.hr
Rules for classification: 1) Points; 2) Head-to-head points; 3) Head-to-head goal difference; 4) Head-to-head goals scored (at home if two teams tied); 5) Goal difference; 6) Goals scored; 7) Play-off
(Note: Criteria 2-4 and 7 is only used if deciding champion, teams to international competition or teams for relegation and in that case criteria 6 will not be used).

==== Results summary ====
| Overall | | | | | | | | Home | | | | | | Away | | | | | |
| Pld | W | D | L | GF | GA | GD | Pts | W | D | L | GF | GA | GD | W | D | L | GF | GA | GD |
|---|---|---|---|---|---|---|---|---|---|---|---|---|---|---|---|---|---|---|---|
| 36 | 7 | 13 | 16 | 36 | 53 | −17 | 34 | 3 | 7 | 8 | 17 | 25 | −8 | 4 | 6 | 8 | 19 | 28 | −9 |

Last updated: 28 October 2020.
Source: Prva HNL

==== Results by round ====
| Round | 1 | 2 | 3 | 4 | 5 | 6 | 7 | 8 | 9 | 10 | 11 | 12 | 13 | 14 | 15 | 16 | 17 | 18 | 19 | 20 | 21 | 22 | 23 | 24 | 25 | 26 | 27 | 28 | 29 | 30 | 31 | 32 | 33 | 34 | 35 | 36 |
|---|---|---|---|---|---|---|---|---|---|---|---|---|---|---|---|---|---|---|---|---|---|---|---|---|---|---|---|---|---|---|---|---|---|---|---|---|
| Ground | A | H | A | H | A | A | H | H | A | H | A | H | A | H | A | H | A | H | A | H | A | H | A | H | A | H | A | H | A | H | A | H | A | H | A | H |
| Result | D | L | D | D | D | D | L | W | W | L | W | L | W | L | L | L | L | W | L | L | D | D | L | D | D | D | D | D | W | D | L | L | L | L | L | W |
| Position | 6 | 8 | 7 | 8 | 7 | 7 | 8 | 6 | 6 | 6 | 6 | 6 | 6 | 6 | 7 | 7 | 7 | 7 | 7 | 7 | 7 | 7 | 7 | 7 | 7 | 7 | 7 | 6 | 6 | 6 | 7 | 7 | 7 | 7 | 7 | 7 |

Updated to match(es) played on 28 October 2020. Source: Prva HNL
A = Away; H = Home; W = Win; D = Draw; L = Loss

==== Matches ====
| 15 August 2020 1 | Osijek | 0–0 | Slaven Belupo | Osijek |
| 20:05 CEST (UTC+2) | Škorić (yellow card) 26' (yellow-red card) 30'; Majstorović (yellow card) 70' | Report | Bačelić-Grgić (yellow card) 48'; Glavčić (yellow card) 67'; Lulić (yellow card) 87' | Stadium: Gradski Vrt Stadium; Attendance: 0 Referee: Ivan Bebek |

| 22 August 2020 2 | Slaven Belupo | 1–2 | Gorica | Koprivnica |
| 17:55 CEST (UTC+2) | Glavčić 45+1' | Report | Kalik (yellow card) 81'; Mudrinski 86', 90+2' | Stadium: Gradski stadion Attendance: 0 Referee: Marin Vidulin |

| 29 August 2020 3 | Hajduk Split | 2–2 | Slaven Belupo | Split |
| 20:05 CEST (UTC+2) | Jairo (yellow card) 6' (yellow-red card) 85'; Vušković (yellow card) 45'; Diamantakos 52'; Gyurcsó 65' | Report | Krstanović 38' (pen.), (yellow card) 79'; Lulić (yellow card) 63'; Bačelić-Grgić 71' | Stadium: Stadion Poljud; Attendance: 0 Referee: Damir Batinić |

| 11 September 2020 4 | Slaven Belupo | 0–0 | Šibenik | Koprivnica |
| 20:00 CEST (UTC+2) | Boakye (yellow card) 34'; Lulić (yellow card) 61'; Goda (yellow card) 90+3' | Report | Rak (yellow card) 26'; Pandža (yellow card) 44'; Pajić (yellow card) 81'; Ampem (yellow card) 85' | Stadium: Gradski stadion Attendance: 0 Referee: Ante Čuljak |

| 19 September 2020 5 | Dinamo Zagreb | 3–3 | Slaven Belupo | Zagreb |
| 19:05 CEST (UTC+2) | Gavranović 4', 8'; Théophile-Catherine (yellow card) 32'; Majer 69'; Stojanović (yellow card) 71'; Jakić (yellow card) 76' | Report | Etoundi 1'; Krstanović 22' (pen.); Van Bruggen (yellow card) 34'; Mlinar (yellow card) 38'; Glavčić (yellow card) 66'; Knöll 73'; Zirdum (yellow card) 78' (yellow-red card) 89' | Stadium: Stadion Maksimir; Attendance: 354; Referee: Dario Kulušić |

| 4 October 2020 7 | Rijeka | 2–0 | Slaven Belupo | Rijeka |
| 19:05 CEST (UTC+2) | Tomečak (yellow card) 45+1'; Andrijašević 69'; Štefulj (yellow card) 76'; Kulenović 90+2' (pen.) | Report | Goda (yellow card) 55'; Prce (yellow card) 76' | Stadium: Rujevica; Attendance: 2,275; Referee: Ivan Vučković |

| 16 October 2020 8 | Slaven Belupo | 5–1 | Istra 1961 | Koprivnica, Croatia |
| | | Report | | Stadium: Gradski |

| 23 October 2020 9 | Varaždin | 1-2 | Slaven Belupo | Varaždin, Croatia |
| | | Report | | Stadium: Anđelko Herjavec |

| 28 October 2020 6 | Slaven Belupo | 0–0 | Lokomotiva | Koprivnica |
| 17:00 CET (UTC+1) | | Report | | Stadium: Gradski stadion Attendance: 0 Referee: Tihomir Pejin |

== Statistics ==
=== Goalscorers ===
As of 29 August 2020

| Rank | No. | Pos | Nat | Name | HT Prva liga | Croatian Cup | Total |
|---|---|---|---|---|---|---|---|
| 1 | 10 | MF | (Croatia) | Stipe Bačelić-Grgić | 1 | 0 | 1 |
| 1 | 11 | MF | (Serbia) | Nemanja Glavčić | 1 | 0 | 1 |
| 1 | 99 | FW | (Croatia) | Ivan Krstanović | 1 | 0 | 1 |
| Totals | | | | | 3 | 0 | 3 |
