= Ramón Miérez =

Argentine footballer

Personal information
- Full name: Ramón Nazareno Miérez
- Date of birth: 13 May 1997 (age 29)
- Place of birth: Resistencia, Argentina
- Height: 1.82 m (6 ft 0 in)
- Position: Forward

Team information
- Current team: Al-Nasr
- Number: 13

Youth career
- Tigre

Senior career*
Years	Team	Apps	(Gls)
2016–2019	Tigre	30	(4)
2018–2019	→ Istra 1961 (loan)	22	(9)
2019–2021	Alavés	0	(0)
2019–2020	→ Tenerife (loan)	20	(1)
2020–2021	→ Osijek (loan)	31	(22)
2021–2024	Osijek	95	(34)
2024–2025	Al Jazira	23	(6)
2025–	Al-Nasr	10	(2)
- * Club domestic league appearances and goals as of 6 January 2026

Ramón Nazareno Miérez (born 13 May 1997) is an Argentine professional footballer who plays as a forward for UAE Pro League club Al-Nasr.

== Career ==
On 14 June 2019, Miérez signed for Deportivo Alavés in Spain. On 5 August, however, he was loaned to Segunda División side CD Tenerife for one year.

On 27 August 2020, Miérez went to NK Osijek on loan. Miérez signed a permanent deal with Osijek following the successful loan.

== Career statistics ==
=== Club ===
As of match played 6 January 2026

Appearances and goals by club, season and competition
Club	Season	League			National cup (Note: Includes Copa Argentina, Croatian Football Cup and UAE President's Cup)		League cup (Note: Includes UAE League Cup)		Continental		Total	
Club	Season	Division	Apps	Goals	Apps	Goals	Apps	Goals	Apps	Goals	Apps	Goals
Tigre	2016	Argentine Primera División	2	1	1	0	—		—		3	1
Tigre	2016–17	Argentine Primera División	20	2	1	0	—		—		21	2
Tigre	2017–18	Argentine Primera División	8	1	—		—		—		8	1
Tigre	Total		30	4	2	0	—		—		32	4
Istra (loan)	2018–19	Prva HNL	22	9	1	1	—		—		23	10
Tenerife (loan)	2019–20	Segunda División	20	1	—		—		—		20	1
Osijek (loan)	2020–21	Prva HNL	31	22	3	1	—		1 (Note: Appearance in UEFA Europa League)	0	35	23
Osijek	2021–22	Prva HNL	28	3	4	1	—		4 (Note: Appearances in UEFA Europa Conference League)	0	36	4
Osijek	2022–23	Prva HNL	32	12	2	0	—		2	0	36	12
Osijek	2023–24	Prva HNL	34	19	3	1	—		4	1	41	21
Osijek	2024–25	Prva HNL	1	0	—		—		2	3	3	3
Osijek	Total		127	56	12	3	—		13	4	152	63
Al Jazira	2024–25	UAE Pro League	22	6	3	2	7	5	—		32	13
Al Jazira	2025–26	UAE Pro League	1	0	—		—		—		1	0
Al Jazira	Total		23	6	3	2	7	5	—		33	13
Al-Nasr	2025–26	UAE Pro League	10	2	1	0	4	1	—		15	3
Career total			206	73	15	4	2	2	13	4	236	83

== Honours ==
Al Jazira

- UAE League Cup: 2024–25

Individual

- Croatian Football League Team of the Year: 2023–24
- Croatian Football League Top scorer: 2020–21, 2023–24
