= Mihael Žaper =

Croatian footballer

Personal information
- Date of birth: 11 August 1998 (age 28)
- Place of birth: Osijek, Croatia
- Height: 1.88 m (6 ft 2 in)
- Position: Midfielder

Team information
- Current team: Hajduk Split
- Number: 45

Youth career
- 2008–2010: Olimpija Osijek
- 2010–2016: Osijek

Senior career*
Years	Team	Apps	(Gls)
2016–2019	Osijek II	56	(6)
2016–2023	Osijek	127	(18)
2023–	Hajduk Split	13	(1)
2025	→ Lokomotiva (loan)	4	(0)
2026	→ Radomlje (loan)	14	(0)

International career
2016	Croatia U19	2	(0)
2019–2021	Croatia U21	5	(0)
2022	Croatia U23	1	(0)
- * Club domestic league appearances and goals as of 16:43, 15 August 2026 (UTC)

Mihael Žaper (born 11 August 1998) is a Croatian professional footballer who plays as a midfielder for Croatian Football League club Hajduk Split.

== Club career ==
Žaper made his professional debut with Osijek in a 4–2 Croatian First Football League loss to Inter Zaprešić on 13 May 2016, scoring his side's second goal in his debut.

== International career ==
Žaper was born in Croatia, and was called up to represent the Croatia U21 at the 2021 UEFA European Under-21 Championship.

== Career statistics ==
As of 27 July 2023

Appearances and goals by club, season and competition
Club	Season	League			Croatian Cup		Continental		Other		Total	
Club	Season	Division	Apps	Goals	Apps	Goals	Apps	Goals	Apps	Goals	Apps	Goals
Osijek	2015–16	Prva HNL	1	1	—		—		—		1	1
Osijek	2016–17	Prva HNL	0	0	0	0	—		—		0	0
Osijek	2017–18	Prva HNL	0	0	0	0	—		—		0	0
Osijek	2018–19	Prva HNL	10	2	1	0	—		—		11	2
Osijek	2019–20	Prva HNL	30	4	3	0	2 (Note: Appearance(s) in UEFA Europa League)	0	—		35	4
Osijek	2020–21	Prva HNL	30	5	2	0	1	0	—		33	5
Osijek	2021–22	Prva HNL	28	5	4	0	3 (Note: Appearance(s) in UEFA Conference League)	0	—		35	5
Osijek	2022–23	Prva HNL	28	1	3	0	1	0	—		32	1
Career total			127	18	13	0	7	0	0	0	147	18
