= Nemanja Glavčić =

Serbian footballer

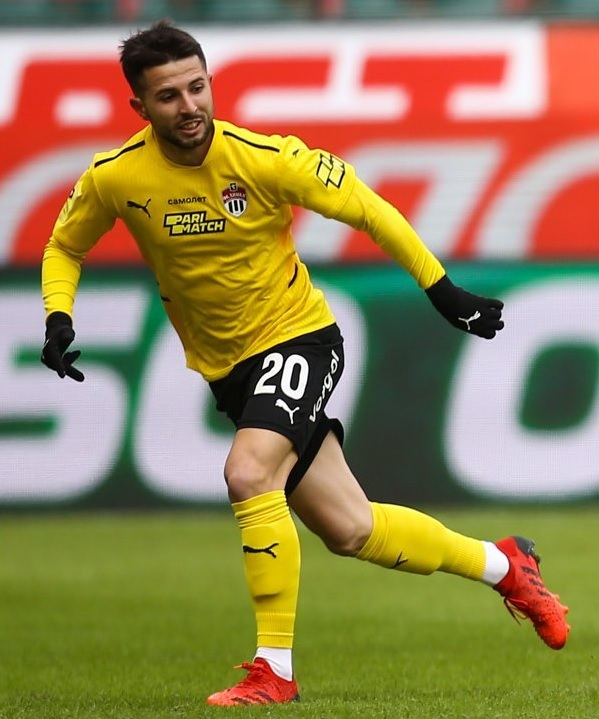
- Glavčić with Khimki in 2022

Personal information
- Date of birth: 19 February 1997 (age 29)
- Place of birth: Kraljevo, Serbia, FR Yugoslavia
- Height: 1.70 m (5 ft 7 in)
- Position: Midfielder

Team information
- Current team: Radnički 1923
- Number: 35

Youth career
- 2002–: Bambi Kraljevo
- Apolon Kraljevo
- –2010: Sloga Kraljevo
- 2011–2014: Partizan

Senior career*
Years	Team	Apps	(Gls)
2014–2016	Partizan	2	(0)
2014–2016	→ Teleoptik (loan)	31	(3)
2016–2019	Spartak Subotica	92	(2)
2019–2022	Slaven Belupo	86	(5)
2022–2023	Khimki	29	(1)
2023–2025	Volos	45	(2)
2025–2026	AEL Limassol	37	(1)
2026–	Radnički 1923	0	(0)

International career^{‡}
2012–2013	Serbia U16	14	(2)
2013–2014	Serbia U17	18	(1)
2014–2015	Serbia U18	13	(0)
2015–2016	Serbia U19	14	(2)
2016–2017	Serbia U20	5	(0)
- * Club domestic league appearances and goals as of 21 July 2026 ‡ National team caps and goals as of 23 December 2017

Nemanja Glavčić (Serbian Cyrillic: Немања Главчић; born 19 February 1997) is a Serbian professional footballer who plays as a midfielder for Serbian SuperLiga club Radnički 1923.

== Club career ==
=== Partizan ===
Originating from Bogutovac, Glavčić was born in Kraljevo. He started training for football at the age of 5 with local football school "Bambi". He played for youth categories of Sloga Kraljevo until 2011, when he joined Partizan. He was loaned to Teleoptik for the 2014–15 season. Glavčić signed his first professional five-year contract with Partizan on 18 June 2015. He made his Serbian SuperLiga debut in 3rd fixture of 2015–16 Serbian SuperLiga, against Novi Pazar. During the winter break off-season, Glavčić returned to Teleoptik, where he spent the rest of 2015–16 season. In summer 2016, Glavčić terminated the contract with club.

=== Spartak Subotica ===
Glavčić moved to Spartak Subotica in summer 2016 and signed a three-year professional contract with the club. He started the 2016–17 Serbian SuperLiga season as the back-up option, having split playing time with Nnaemeka Ajuru for the first half-season. During the second half-season, Glavčić played mostly matches, pairing with Marko Pantić on two defensive midfield positions. During the season, Glavčić made 33 matches in both domestic competitions at total, under coach Andrey Chernyshov. Glavčić scored his first goal for Spartak Subotica in 3–2 victory over Mačva Šabac on 14 August 2017. He also scored in the Serbian Cup match against Polet Lipljan on 20 September same year.

=== Slaven Belupo ===
On 9 July 2019, Glavčić signed for Prva HNL club Slaven Belupo. He scored his first goal on 30 October 2019 in a Croatian Cup match against BSK Bijelo Brdo, which Slaven won 2–0. Upon arrival of new coach Tomislav Stipić, Glavčić soon turned into one of the key parts of the Slaven squad. He scored his first Prva HNL goal on 22 August 2020 in a 2–1 defeat to Gorica. On 16 October, he scored once and assisted Tomislav Božić twice in a 5–1 routing of Istra 1961. He also notably assisted Stipe Bačelić-Grgić in a 2–2 draw with Hajduk Split and Törles Knöll in a 3–3 draw with Dinamo Zagreb on 29 August and 19 September, respectively. His great performances in Croatia sparked debates in Serbia about whether Partizan gave up on the player too early.

=== Khimki ===
On 18 January 2022, he signed a 2.5-year contract with Russian club Khimki.

=== Volos ===
On 27 June 2023, he joined Volos on a free transfer.

== International career ==
Glavčić has been called up to the Serbia national team selections since 2012. As a youth player, he represented the country passing all selections from under-16 to under-19 level. In November 2016, he was also called into the Serbia national under-20 football team under coach Nenad Lalatović for a friendly match against Montenegro, after which he appeared as a regular team member until 2017.

== Career statistics ==
=== Club ===
As of 8 July 2023

Appearances and goals by club, season and competition
Club	Season	League			Cup (Note: Includes the Serbian Cup and the Croatian Cup)		Continental		Other		Total	
Club	Season	Division	Apps	Goals	Apps	Goals	Apps	Goals	Apps	Goals	Apps	Goals
Partizan	2014–15	Serbian SuperLiga	0	0	0	0	0	0	—		0	0
Partizan	2015–16	Serbian SuperLiga	2	0	1	0	0	0	—		3	0
Partizan	Total		2	0	1	0	0	0	0	0	3	0
Teleoptik (loan)	2014–15	Serbian League Belgrade	22	1	—		—		—		22	1
Teleoptik (loan)	2015–16	Serbian League Belgrade	9	2	—		—		—		9	2
Teleoptik (loan)	Total		31	3	0	0	0	0	0	0	31	3
Spartak Subotica	2016–17	Serbian SuperLiga	31	0	2	0	—		—		33	0
Spartak Subotica	2017–18	Serbian SuperLiga	30	1	2	1	—		—		32	2
Spartak Subotica	2018–19	Serbian SuperLiga	31	1	3	0	6 (Note: Appearances in the UEFA Europa League)	0	—		40	1
Spartak Subotica	Total		92	2	7	1	6	0	0	0	105	3
Slaven Belupo	2019–20	Prva HNL	34	0	4	1	—		—		38	1
Slaven Belupo	2020–21	Prva HNL	35	5	3	0	—		—		38	5
Slaven Belupo	2021–22	Prva HNL	17	0	3	0	—		—		20	0
Slaven Belupo	Total		86	5	10	1	0	0	0	0	96	6
Khimki	2021–22	Russian Premier League	12	0	—		—		2 (Note: Appearances in the relegation play-offs)	0	14	0
Khimki	2022–23	Russian Premier League	17	1	4	0	—		—		21	1
Khimki	Total		29	1	4	0	0	0	2	0	35	1
Career total			240	11	22	2	6	0	2	0	270	13

== Honours ==
Partizan

- Serbian Cup: 2015–16
