= Novi grad, Osijek =

Novi grad
- City district of Osijek
- Gradska četvrt Novi grad Novi Grad City District
- Interactive map of Novi grad
- Country: Croatia
- City: Osijek

Government
  - President of Council: Anto Bošnjak (HDSSB)

Population (2001)
  - Total: 16,520

Novi grad is a city district of Osijek, Croatia. It has 16,520 inhabitants distributed in 6,210 households.

Day of the city district is on 5 July, on feast of Saints Cyril and Methodius.

Its name in Croatian literally means "New Town".

== History ==
Novi grad has emerged in the end of 18th century with arrival of German immigrants.
