= Marin Pilj =

Croatian footballer (born 1996)

Personal information
- Date of birth: 3 December 1996 (age 29)
- Place of birth: Osijek, Croatia
- Height: 1.65 m (5 ft 5 in)
- Position: Midfielder

Team information
- Current team: Valpovka Valpovo

Youth career
- 2003–2006: Valpovka Valpovo
- 2006–2009: Osijek
- 2009–2014: KNŠ Hypo Limač

Senior career*
Years	Team	Apps	(Gls)
2015–2016	Belišće	34	(2)
2016–2018	Novigrad	28	(5)
2018	Osijek II	18	(7)
2018–2021	Osijek	100	(7)
2022	Olimpija Ljubljana	23	(2)
2022–2024	Varaždin	48	(3)
2024-2025	Terengganu FC	12	(3)
2025-2026	Vukovar 1991	20	(2)
2026-	Valpovka Valpovo	0	(0)
- * Club domestic league appearances and goals as of 28 June 2024

Marin Pilj (born 3 December 1996) is a Croatian professional footballer who plays as a midfielder for Valpovka Valpovo.
