= Gradski vrt Stadium =

Football stadium in Osijek, Croatia

- Stadion Gradski vrt
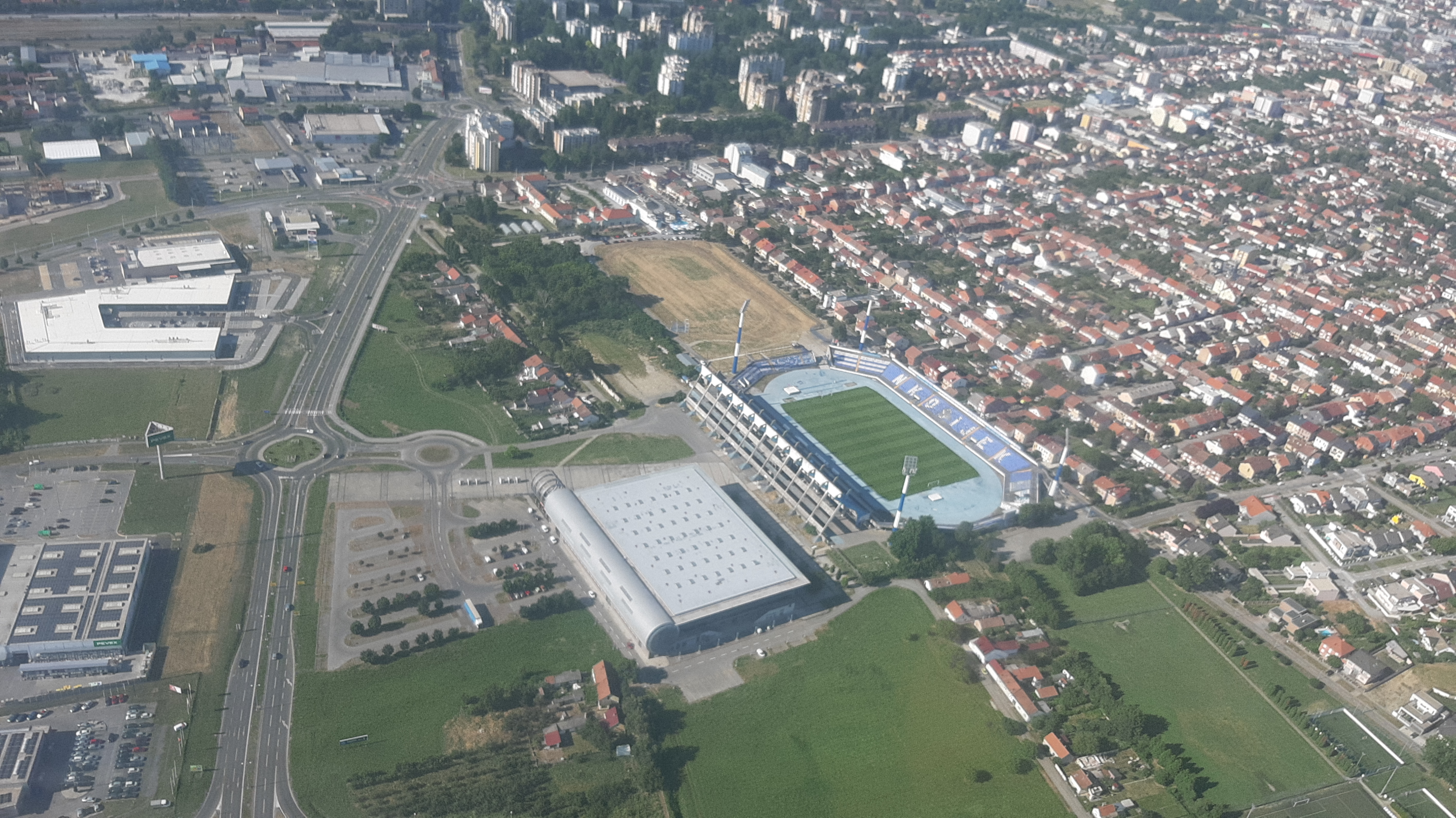
- Aerial view of the stadium Gradski vrt Osijek, 2023
- Interactive map of Gradski vrt Stadium
- Full name: Gradski vrt Stadium
- Location: Novi grad, Osijek, Croatia
- Coordinates: 45°32′42″N 18°41′45″E
- Owner: City of Osijek
- Operator: ŽNK Osijek
- Capacity: 18,856
- Surface: Grass
- Field size: 106 × 69 m

Construction
- Opened: 1980
- Renovated: 2005, 2010

Tenants
- HNK Vukovar 1991 (2026–); NK Osijek (1980–2023); Zrinski Osječko 1664 (2023–); Croatia national football team (1996–2022)

Gradski vrt Stadium (Croatian: Stadion Gradski vrt, lit. 'City Garden Stadium') is a multi-use stadium in Osijek, Croatia. It is located in the Gradski vrt neighbourhood in Novi grad city district. With a capacity of 18,856, it has been best known as the home ground of Croatian football club NK Osijek.

== History ==
Construction started in 1949, but works were stopped several times. The first match played on the ground of Gradski Vrt was played between NK Osijek and FK Sloboda Tuzla on 7 September 1958. In 1980, the stadium was officially opened.

In 1982, the record of stadium attendance was broken, on the football match between NK Osijek and Dinamo Zagreb. At that match, there were 40,000 attendants. The result was 1–2.

In 1998 seats and reflectors were installed. In 2005, the stadium was renovated. Under the west stand, VIP rooms were set and the lodge was rearranged, adding 1,000 new seats. The athletics track was reconstructed, repainted from red to blue. After this renovation, the stadium has fulfilled UEFA's stadium criteria. In the same year, the stadium was a part of Croatia and Hungary's failed bid for the 2012 European Football Championship. At that time a project of a new stadium with a larger capacity was presented.

In 2010, the stadium was again repaired: the pitch was relaid, fences were painted and the seats were numbered. The reason was a friendly match between Croatia and Wales, which was held on 23 May that year.

In May 2016, the stadium hosted the Croatian Cup final.

== Future ==
In April 2018, NK Osijek president Ivan Meštrović released plans for a new stadium for the club. A new state of the art stadium will be built at the Pampas neighbourhood in Osijek as part of the new NK Osijek training centre. The capacity of the new stadium will be 13,000, with all of the seats covered. The stadium will be UEFA category four and is supposed to be finished in Autumn 2022. During the stadium construction, NK Osijek will play their home games at the current stadium, which is in the future going to be used as the main stadium for the NK Osijek B squad.

== International fixtures ==
| Date | Competition | Opponent | Score | Att. | Ref |
Croatia (1990–present)
| 10 April 1996 | Friendly | Hungary | 4–1 | 10,287 | |
| 22 April 1998 | Friendly | Poland | 4–1 | 16,000 | |
| 24 March 2001 | 2002 FIFA World Cup qualification | Latvia | 4–1 | 13,345 | |
| 7 September 2002 | UEFA Euro 2004 qualification | Estonia | 0–0 | 10,766 | |
| 28 May 2006 | Friendly | Iran | 2–2 | 20,000 | |
| 23 May 2010 | Friendly | Wales | 2–0 | 10,482 | |
| 16 October 2012 | 2014 FIFA World Cup qualification | Wales | 2–0 | 17,500 | |
| 31 May 2014 | Friendly | Mali | 2–1 | 15,212 | |
| 13 October 2014 | UEFA Euro 2016 qualification | Azerbaijan | 6–0 | 16,021 | |
| 23 March 2016 | Friendly | Israel | 2–0 | 10,545 | |
| 8 June 2018 | Friendly | Senegal | 2–1 | 15,998 | |
| 8 June 2019 | UEFA Euro 2020 qualification | Wales | 2–1 | 17,061 | |
| 11 October 2021 | 2022 FIFA World Cup qualification | Slovakia | 2–2 | 9,926 | |
| 3 June 2022 | 2022–23 UEFA Nations League | Austria | 0–3 | 13,994 | |

== Gallery ==
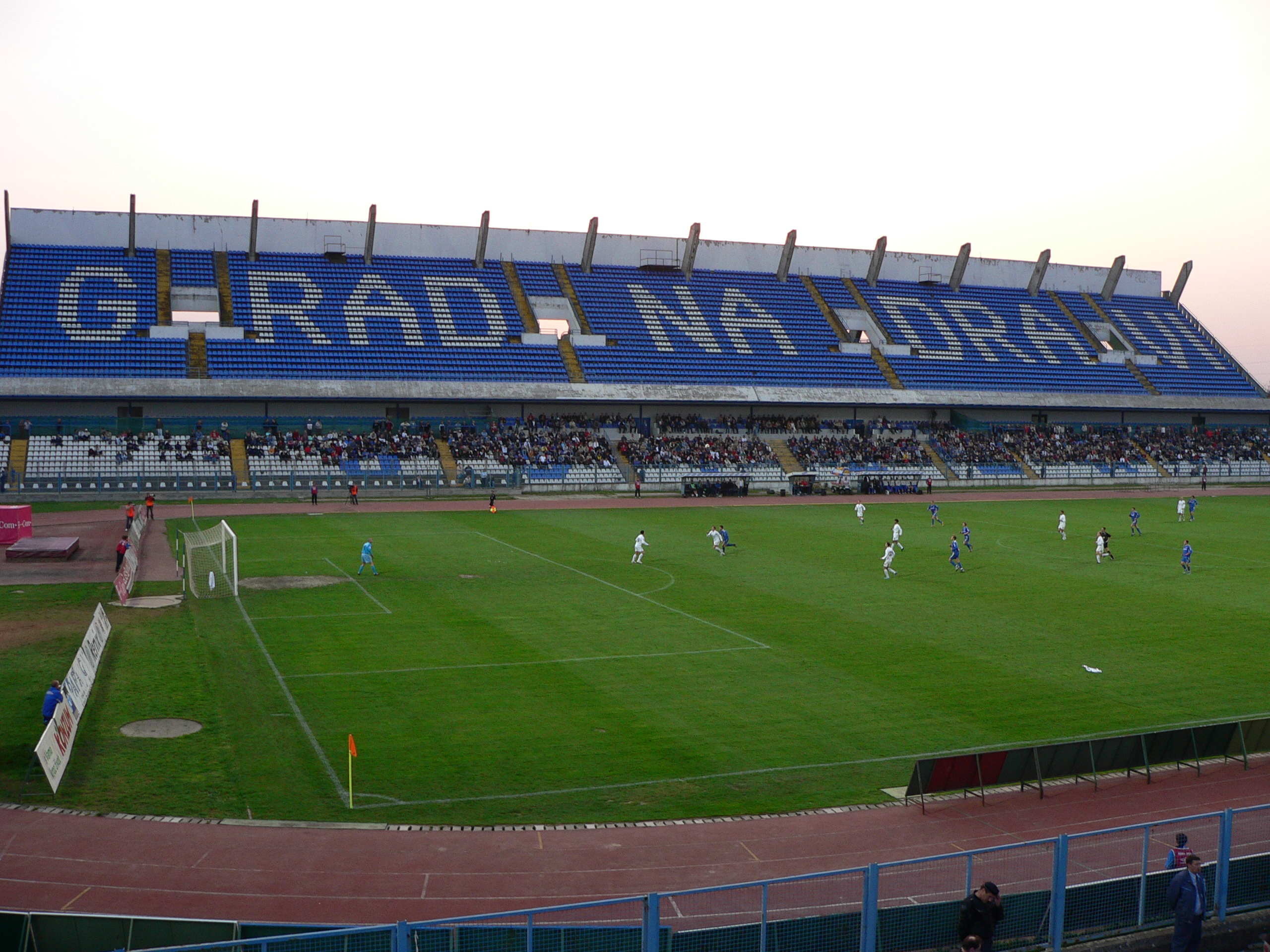
West stand (before 2005 renovation)

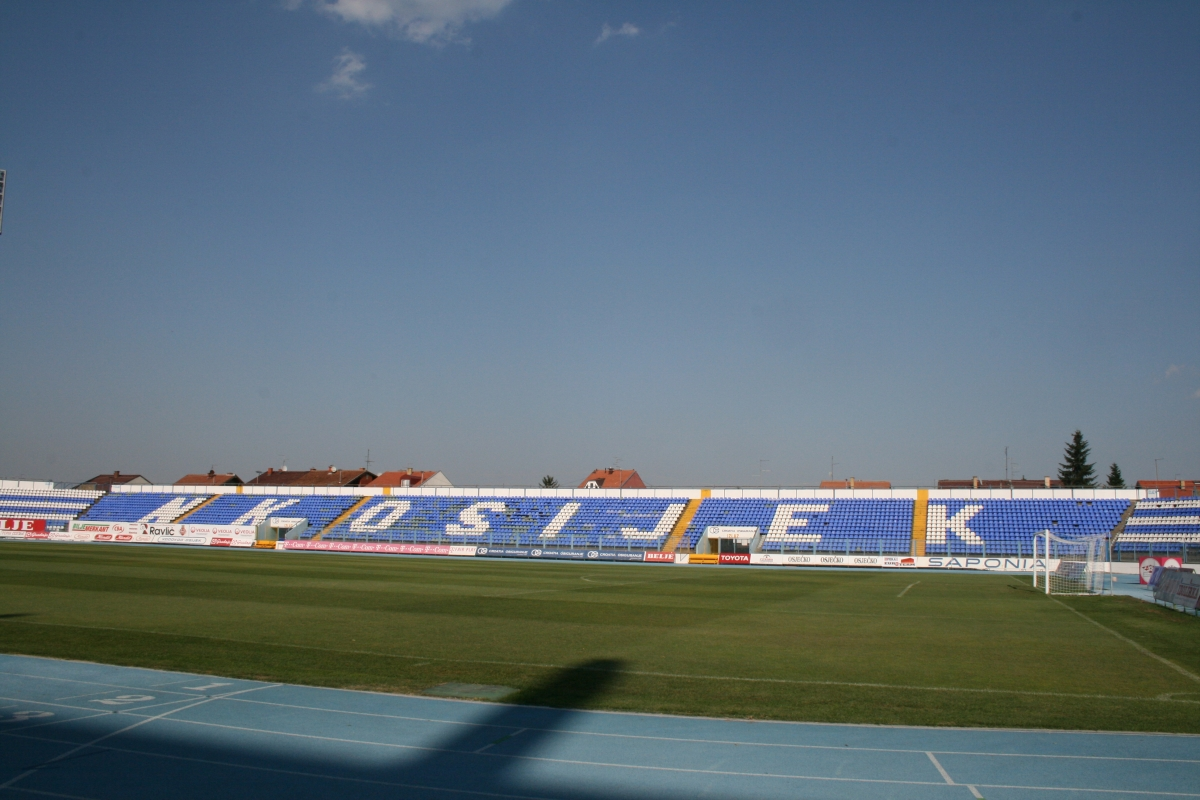
East stand (after 2005 renovation).

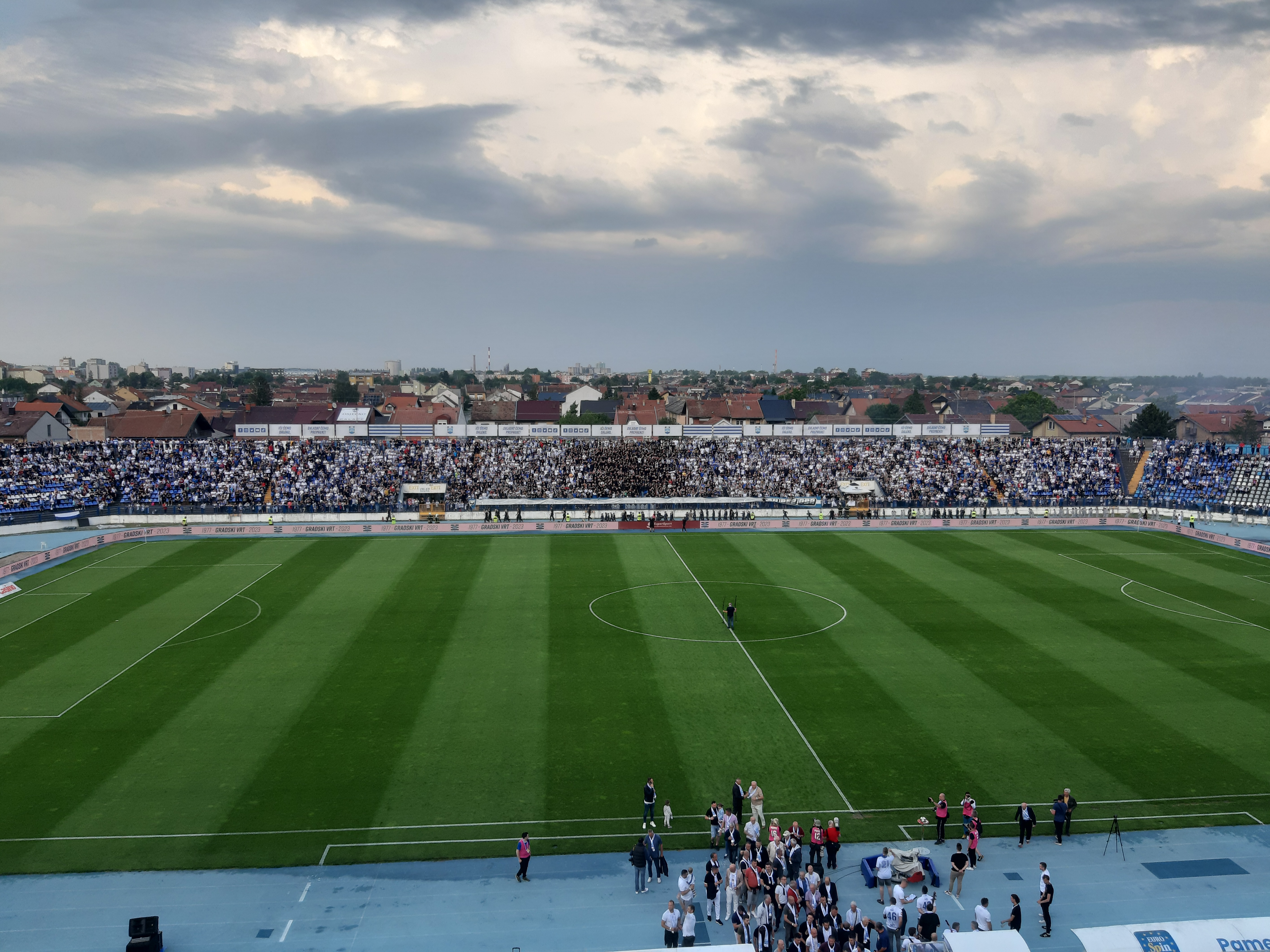
Last match at stadium Gradski vrt, May 2023

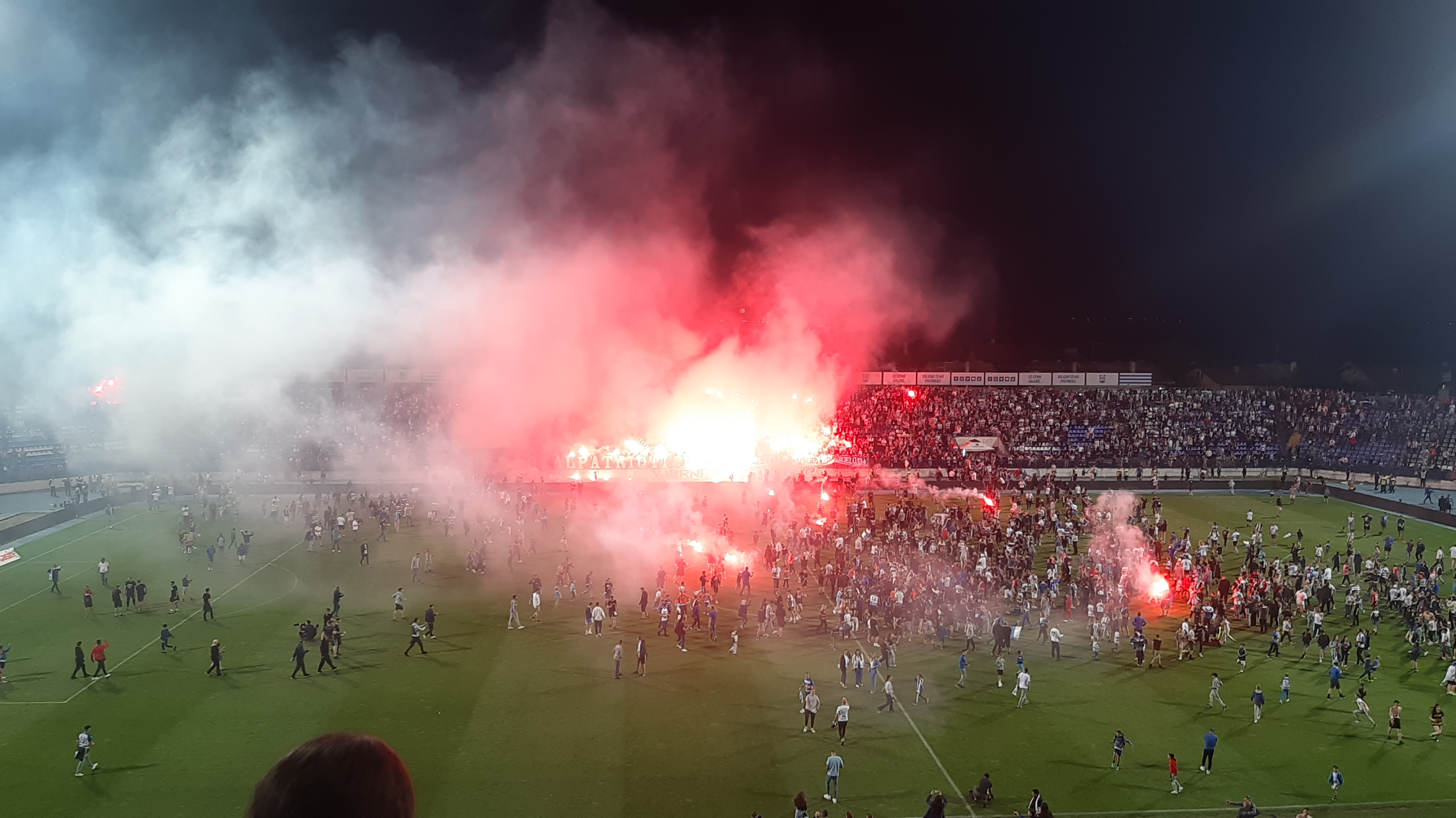
Fireworks by fans of the football club Osijek after the last game played at the Gradski vrt stadium
