= Danijel Lončar =

German footballer

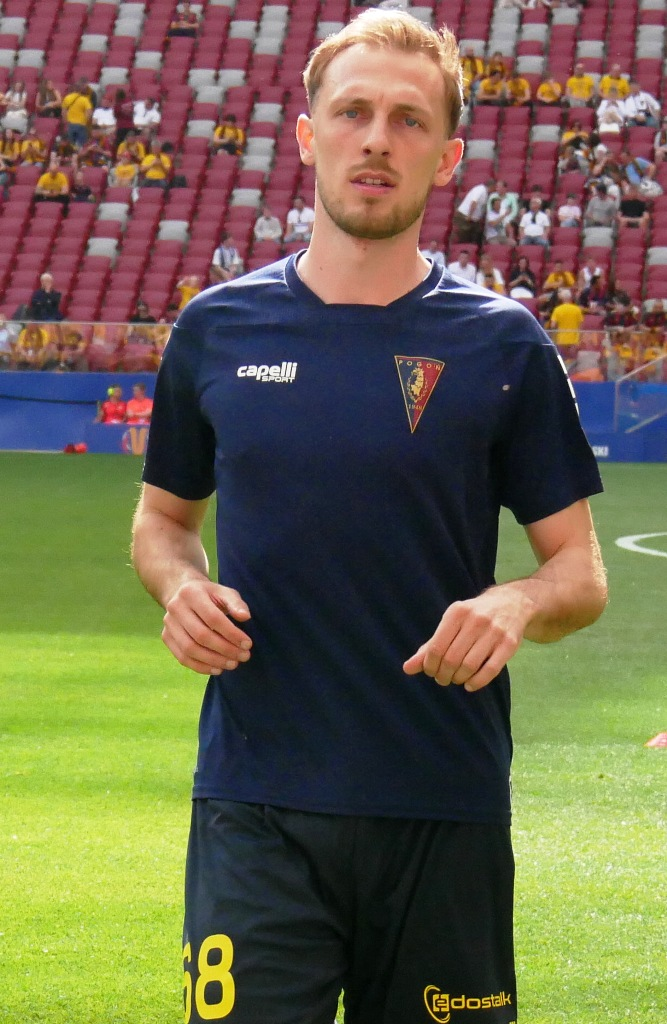
- Lončar with Pogoń Szczecin in 2025

Personal information
- Full name: Danijel Lončar
- Date of birth: 26 June 1997 (age 29)
- Place of birth: Versmold, Germany
- Height: 1.90 m (6 ft 3 in)
- Position: Centre-back

Team information
- Current team: Persib Bandung
- Number: 22

Youth career
- Osijek

Senior career*
Years	Team	Apps	(Gls)
2017–2023	Osijek	103	(3)
2018–2019	Osijek II	8	(0)
2023–2026	Pogoń Szczecin	64	(2)
2023	Pogoń Szczecin II	1	(0)
2026–	Persib Bandung	5	(0)
- * Club domestic league appearances and goals as of 22:00, 1 November 2026 (UTC)

Danijel Lončar (born 26 June 1997) is a German professional footballer who plays as a centre-back for Super League club Persib Bandung.
