= Mato Miloš =

Croatian footballer (born 1993)

Personal information
- Full name: Mato Miloš
- Date of birth: 30 June 1993 (age 33)
- Place of birth: Pula, Croatia
- Height: 1.75 m (5 ft 9 in)
- Position: Right-back

Team information
- Current team: Odra Opole
- Number: 7

Youth career
- 2003–2007: Jadran Poreč
- 2007–2012: Rijeka

Senior career*
| Years | Team | Apps | (Gls) |
| 2011–2016 | Rijeka | 21 | (0) |
| 2013 | → Cibalia (loan) | 11 | (0) |
| 2013–2014 | → Siena (loan) | 11 | (0) |
| 2014–2015 | → Spezia (loan) | 41 | (0) |
| 2016 | → Perugia (loan) | 14 | (1) |
| 2016–2017 | Istra 1961 | 29 | (0) |
| 2017–2018 | Benfica | 0 | (0) |
| 2017–2018 | → Lechia Gdańsk (loan) | 14 | (0) |
| 2018–2020 | Aves | 21 | (0) |
| 2021–2022 | Osijek | 41 | (0) |
| 2022–2024 | Widzew Łódź | 43 | (1) |
| 2024 | Mura | 7 | (0) |
| 2025– | Odra Opole | 24 | (0) |

International career
| 2009 | Croatia U16 | 4 | (0) |
| 2009 | Croatia U17 | 2 | (0) |
| 2011 | Croatia U18 | 4 | (0) |
| 2011–2012 | Croatia U19 | 6 | (0) |
| 2011–2013 | Croatia U20 | 3 | (0) |
| 2013–2014 | Croatia U21 | 6 | (0) |
| 2017 | Croatia | 1 | (0) |
- * Club domestic league appearances and goals as of 08:27, 27 May 2026 (UTC)

Mato Miloš (Croatian pronunciation: [mîloʃ]; born 30 June 1993) is a Croatian professional footballer who plays as a right-back for I liga club Odra Opole.

== Club career ==
Born in Pula, Miloš went through the ranks of his hometown club NK Jadran Poreč, before moving to NK Rijeka, aged 14. He got his first cap for Rijeka at the age of 17, during the 2010-11 Prva HNL. In early 2013, he was loaned to Cibalia, and this was followed by loans to Siena, Spezia and Perugia in Italy's Serie B.

In August 2017, he was transferred to Benfica for a fee of €400,000. On 31 August, he joined Polish side Lechia Gdańsk on a season-long loan deal. In 2018, he moved to fellow Portuguese side CD Aves. In January 2021, he signed with Osijek.

On 27 August 2022, Miloš returned to Poland to join top division side Widzew Łódź on a two-year contract, with an option for another year. He recorded one goal and three assists in 44 appearances across all competitions, and left the club at the end of the 2023–24 season.

In August 2024, Miloš joined Slovenian outfit Mura. He made seven league appearances before terminating his contract at the end of the year. On 31 March 2025, he signed a three-month contract with Polish second tier side Odra Opole; the club however missed the deadline to register Miloš to play. On 19 June 2025, he prolonged his contract with Odra for another year.

== International career ==
He has earned six caps for the Croatia under-19 team, including a cap at the 2012 UEFA European Championship.

He made his senior debut for Croatia in a May 2017 friendly match against Mexico, coming on as a 90th-minute substitute for Nikola Vlašić. It remained his sole international appearance.

== Career statistics ==
=== International ===
Appearances and goals by national team and year
| National team | Year | Apps | Goals |
|---|---|---|---|
Croatia
| Croatia | 2017 | 1 | 0 |
| Total | | 1 | 0 |
