= Antonijo Ježina =

Croatian footballer

Personal information
- Date of birth: 5 June 1989 (age 37)
- Place of birth: Šibenik, SR Croatia, SFR Yugoslavia
- Height: 1.93 m (6 ft 4 in)
- Position: Goalkeeper

Youth career
- –2001: Mladost Tribunj
- 2001–2004: NK Otok Murter
- 2004–2008: Zadar

Senior career*
Years	Team	Apps	(Gls)
2007–2012	Zadar	80	(0)
2013	Istra 1961	26	(0)
2014–2016	Dinamo Zagreb	21	(0)
2015–2016	Dinamo Zagreb II	4	(0)
2016–2019	Royal Antwerp	4	(0)
2019–2020	Slaven Belupo	18	(0)
2020–2021	Osijek	0	(0)

International career^{‡}
2006–2007	Croatia U18	5	(0)
2006–2008	Croatia U19	8	(0)
2008–2009	Croatia U20	4	(0)
2007–2009	Croatia U21	6	(0)
2013	Croatia	1	(0)
- * Club domestic league appearances and goals as of 27 July 2019 ‡ National team caps and goals as of 25 October 2015

Antonijo Ježina (born 5 June 1989) is a Croatian footballer who most recently played for Osijek as a goalkeeper.

== Club career ==
Ježina joined Belgian second tier-side Royal Antwerp in summer 2016.

== International career ==
He made his debut for the Croatian senior national team on September 10, 2013, in a friendly match against South Korea. Entering the match as an injury time substitute for Dario Krešić, he conceded a goal in less than a minute he spent on the field.
