= Törles Knöll =

German footballer

Personal information
- Full name: Törles Tim Knöll
- Date of birth: 13 September 1997 (age 29)
- Place of birth: Dieburg, Germany
- Height: 1.84 m (6 ft 0 in)
- Position: Forward

Team information
- Current team: Al-Tai
- Number: 9

Youth career
- TV Semd
- –2006: GSV Gundershausen
- 2006–2010: Darmstadt 98
- 2010–2012: Eintracht Frankfurt
- 2012–2013: FSV Frankfurt
- 2013–2016: Mainz 05

Senior career*
Years	Team	Apps	(Gls)
2016–2018	Hamburger SV II	62	(37)
2017–2018	Hamburger SV	1	(0)
2018–2020	1. FC Nürnberg	17	(1)
2019	1. FC Nürnberg II	1	(3)
2019–2020	→ Wehen Wiesbaden (loan)	18	(2)
2020–2021	Slaven Belupo	37	(7)
2021–2022	Türkgücü München	16	(1)
2022–2023	Kickers Offenbach	13	(2)
2023–2024	Vukovar 1991	47	(21)
2024	Den Bosch	15	(3)
2025	Vukovar 1991	18	(6)
2025–	Al-Tai	0	(0)

International career^{‡}
2017	Germany U20	4	(0)
2018	Germany U21	2	(1)
- * Club domestic league appearances and goals as of 20 December 2024 ‡ National team caps and goals as of 20:15, 19 November 2018 (UTC)

Törles Tim Knöll (born 13 September 1997) is a German professional footballer who plays as a forward for Saudi club Al-Tai.

== Career ==
In February 2018, 1. FC Nürnberg announced Knöll would join the club for the 2018–19 season from Hamburger SV II.

On 22 August 2019, Knöll joined Wehen Wiesbaden on a season-long loan deal.

Knöll left 1. FC Nürnberg in August 2020 joining Croatian First Football League side Slaven Belupo.

In June 2024, Knöll joined Dutch Eerste Divisie club Den Bosch on a two-year contract with the option for a further season.

On 24 December 2024, he agreed to return to his previous Croatian club Vukovar 1991 in January 2025.

On 17 September 2025, Knöll joined Saudi First Division League club Al-Tai.
