= 2020–21 NK Istra 1961 season =

NK Istra 1961
2020–21 season
- Owner: Baskonia - Alavés Group
- Manager: Ivan Prelec (until 15 August 2020); Fausto Budicin (26 August 2020 - 11 February 2021); Danijel Jumić (since 11 February 2021)
- Stadium: Stadion Aldo Drosina
- Prva HNL: 9th
- Croatian Cup: Runners-up
- Top goalscorer: League: Matej Vuk (6); All: Taichi Hara (8)
- Highest home attendance: 761 v Šibenik (26 September 2020)
- Lowest home attendance: 761 v Šibenik (26 September 2020)
- Average home league attendance: 42
Home colours

The 2020–21 NK Istra 1961 season was the club's 60th season in existence and the 12th consecutive season in the top flight of Croatian football.

== First-team squad ==
As of 23 February 2021

Note: Flags indicate national team as defined under FIFA eligibility rules; some limited exceptions apply. Players may hold more than one non-FIFA nationality.

No.	Pos.	Nation	Player
1	GK	AUT	Ivan Lučić
2	DF	CRO	Luka Hujber
3	DF	ESP	Sergi González (on loan from Deportivo Alavés)
4	DF	ESP	Rafael Páez (on loan from Deportivo Alavés)
6	DF	CRO	Petar Bosančić
7	FW	CRO	Šime Gržan
8	MF	ESP	Einar Galilea (on loan from Deportivo Alavés)
9	FW	JPN	Taichi Hara
10	FW	BIH	Gedeon Guzina
11	FW	CRO	Josip Špoljarić (on loan from NK Osijek)
12	DF	ESP	Rafa Navarro (on loan from Deportivo Alavés)
14	MF	ESP	Antonio Perera (on loan from Deportivo Alavés)
16	GK	CMR	Fabrice Ondoa (on loan from Deportivo Alavés)
17	MF	SEN	Arona Sané
18	FW	BFA	Hassane Bandé (on loan from Ajax)
20	MF	CRO	Antonio Ivančić
21	GK	CRO	Lovro Majkić

No.	Pos.	Nation	Player
22	MF	CRO	Matej Vuk (on loan from Rijeka)
23	MF	MNE	Stefan Lončar
24	MF	CRO	Dino Halilović
27	DF	CRO	Josip Tomašević
28	FW	CRO	Leon Šipoš (on loan from Spartaks Jūrmala)
30	DF	AUT	Mario Lovre Vojković
31	DF	CRO	Toni Burić
34	MF	CRO	Mateo Lisica
36	FW	CRO	Marko Bibić
37	DF	CRO	Josip Šutalo (on loan from Dinamo Zagreb)
39	DF	CRO	Mauro Perković
42	GK	CRO	Jan Paus-Kunšt
44	DF	POR	João Silva
63	MF	WAL	Dylan Levitt (on loan from Manchester United)
77	MF	CRO	Slavko Blagojević
96	GK	CRO	Lovro Juric

== Transfers ==
=== In ===
Pos	Player	Transferred from	Fee	Date	Source
MF	(Spain) Antonio Perera	(Spain) Deportivo Alavés	Loan	26 August 2020	
DF	(Croatia) Luka Hujber	(Croatia) Lokomotiva	Free	4 September 2020	
MF	(Croatia) Dino Halilović	(Croatia) Lokomotiva	Undisclosed	4 September 2020	
GK	(Croatia) Lovro Juric	(Croatia) Dinamo Zagreb II	Free	11 September 2020	
DF	(Austria) Mario Lovre Vojković	(Austria) SV Ried	Free	14 September 2020	
MF	(Croatia) Matej Vuk	(Croatia) Rijeka	Loan	15 September 2020	
FW	(Croatia) Josip Špoljarić	(Croatia) Osijek	Loan	28 September 2020	
DF	(South Korea) Kim Hyun-woo	(Croatia) Dinamo Zagreb II	Loan	29 September 2020	
MF	(South Korea) Kim Gyu-hyeong	(Croatia) Dinamo Zagreb II	Loan	29 September 2020	
DF	(Spain) Rafa Navarro	(Spain) Deportivo Alavés	Loan	5 October 2020	
GK	(Austria) Ivan Lučić	No team	Free	23 November 2020	
DF	(Croatia) Josip Šutalo	(Croatia) Dinamo Zagreb	Loan	18 January 2021	
DF	(Portugal) João Silva	(Portugal) Sporting CP	Free	2 February 2021	
FW	(Croatia) Leon Šipoš	(Latvia) Spartaks Jūrmala	Loan	2 February 2021	
FW	(Burkina Faso) Hassane Bandé	(Netherlands) Ajax	Loan	9 February 2021	
FW	(Japan) Taichi Hara	(Japan) Tokyo	Free	10 February 2021	
GK	(Cameroon) Fabrice Ondoa	(Spain) Deportivo Alavés	Loan	13 February 2021	
MF	(Wales) Dylan Levitt	(England) Manchester United	Loan	15 February 2021	

Source: Glasilo Hrvatskog nogometnog saveza

=== Out ===
Pos	Player	Transferred to	Fee	Date	Source
MF	(Croatia) Matija Fintić	(Croatia) Dinamo Zagreb II	Back from loan	5 August 2020	
MF	(Croatia) Mario Munivrana	No team	Free	7 August 2020	
MF	(Croatia) Denis Bušnja	(Croatia) Rijeka	Back from loan	9 August 2020	
FW	(Croatia) Ivan Delić	(Croatia) Hajduk Split	Back from loan	10 August 2020	
DF	(Croatia) Marin Grujević	No team	Free	14 August 2020	
MF	(Croatia) Ivan Močinić	No team	Free	14 August 2020	
DF	(Croatia) Martin Franić	No team	Free	19 August 2020	
GK	(Croatia) Josip Čondrić	(Russia) Rotor Volgograd	122,000 €	28 August 2020	
FW	(Croatia) Josip Maganjić	(Italy) Fiorentina	Back from loan	31 August 2020	
DF	(Austria) Markus Pavić	No team	Free	14 August 2020	
MF	(Ghana) Obeng Regan	No team	Free	8 September 2020	
GK	(Croatia) Tomislav Duka	(Croatia) Zagora Unešić	Free	11 September 2020	
GK	(Croatia) Tony Macan	(Croatia) Uljanik	Loan	18 September 2020	
DF	(North Macedonia) Agron Rufati	(Ukraine) Zorya Luhansk	Undisclosed	18 September 2020	
FW	(Lithuania) Karolis Laukžemis	No team	Free	24 September 2020	
MF	(Venezuela) Octavio Páez	No team	Free	4 October 2020	
MF	(Albania) Drilon Sadiku	(Belgium) Lierse	Free	5 October 2020	
FW	(Croatia) Robert Perić-Komšić	(Croatia) Cibalia	Loan	9 October 2020	
MF	(Spain) Adrián Fuentes	(Spain) Deportivo Alavés	Recalled from loan	29 January 2021	
FW	(Croatia) Vice Miljanić	(Croatia) Inter Zaprešić	Free	6 February 2021	
DF	(South Korea) Kim Hyun-woo	(Croatia) Dinamo Zagreb II	Recalled from loan	11 February 2021	
MF	(South Korea) Kim Gyu-hyeong	(Croatia) Dinamo Zagreb II	Recalled from loan	11 February 2021	

Source: Glasilo Hrvatskog nogometnog saveza

Total spending: ▼0 €

Total income: ▲122,000 €

Total expenditure: ▲122,000 €

== Competitions ==
=== Overview ===
Competition	First match	Last match	Starting round	Final position	Record							
Competition	First match	Last match	Starting round	Final position	Pld	W	D	L	GF	GA	GD	Win %
HT Prva liga	16 August 2020	22 May 2021	Matchday 1	9th	36	7	8	21	27	52	−25	19.44
Croatian Cup	7 October 2020	19 May 2021	First round	Runners-up	5	4	0	1	13	8	+5	80.00
Total					41	11	8	22	40	60	−20	26.83

Last updated: 23 May 2021
Source: Soccerway

=== HT Prva liga ===
==== League table ====
Pos	Team	Pld	W	D	L	GF	GA	GD	Pts	Qualification or relegation
6	Šibenik	36	9	8	19	32	47	−15	35	
7	Slaven Belupo	36	7	13	16	36	53	−17	34	
8	Lokomotiva	36	7	9	20	29	60	−31	30	
9	Istra 1961	36	7	8	21	27	52	−25	29	
10	Varaždin (R)	36	6	10	20	30	61	−31	28	Relegation for the Croatian Second Football League

Source: PrvaHNL.hr
Rules for classification: 1) Points; 2) Head-to-head points; 3) Head-to-head goal difference; 4) Head-to-head goals scored (at home if two teams tied); 5) Goal difference; 6) Goals scored; 7) Play-off
(Note: Criteria 2-4 and 7 is only used if deciding champion, teams to international competition or teams for relegation and in that case criteria 6 will not be used).
(R) Relegated

==== Results summary ====
Overall								Home						Away					
Pld	W	D	L	GF	GA	GD	Pts	W	D	L	GF	GA	GD	W	D	L	GF	GA	GD
36	7	8	21	27	52	−25	29	6	2	10	16	23	−7	1	6	11	11	29	−18

Last updated: 23 May 2021.
Source: Prva HNL

==== Results by round ====
Round	1	2	3	4	5	6	7	8	9	10	11	12	13	14	15	16	17	18	19	20	21	22	23	24	25	26	27	28	29	30	31	32	33	34	35	36
Ground	A	H	A	H	A	H	A	A	H	H	A	H	A	H	A	H	H	A	A	H	A	H	A	H	A	A	H	H	A	H	H	A	H	A	H	A
Result	L	L	L	L	D	W	D	L	L	W	L	L	D	D	L	W	W	L	L	L	D	L	L	W	W	D	L	L	L	L	D	L	L	D	W	L
Position	8	10	10	10	10	10	9	10	10	8	8	10	10	8	10	8	8	8	9	9	10	10	10	9	8	8	8	8	9	9	9	10	10	10	9	9

Updated to match(es) played on 22 May 2021. Source: Prva HNL
A = Away; H = Home; W = Win; D = Draw; L = Loss

==== Matches ====
16 August 2020 1	Hajduk Split	2–0	Istra 1961	Split
17:55 CEST (UTC+02:00)	Čuić (yellow card) 53'; Dimitrov 72'*Gyurcsó 83'; Caktaš (yellow card) 90+4'	Report	Blagojević (yellow card) 34'	Stadium: Stadion Poljud; Attendance: 0 Referee: Mario Zebec

21 August 2020 2	Istra 1961	0–1	Dinamo Zagreb	Pula
20:05 CEST (UTC+02:00)	Regan (yellow card) 23'; Sergi (yellow card) 75'; Páez (yellow card) 86'; Blagojević (yellow card) 86'; Tomašević (yellow card) 89'	Report	Kastrati (yellow card) 34' (yellow-red card) 57'; Petković 87' (pen.)	Stadium: Stadion Aldo Drosina; Attendance: 0 Referee: Dario Bel

29 August 2020 3	Rijeka	2–1	Istra 1961	Rijeka
17:55 CEST (UTC+02:00)	Andrijašević 13', 69' (pen.); Galović (yellow card) 53'; Čerin (yellow card) 81'; Capan (yellow card) 90+5'	Report	Bosančić (yellow card) 62'; Guzina 70'	Stadium: Stadion Rujevica; Attendance: 0 Referee: Fran Jović

12 September 2020 4	Istra 1961	0–1	Varaždin	Pula
19:00 CEST (UTC+02:00)	Blagojević (yellow card) 25'; Guzina (yellow card) 57'; Galilea (yellow card) 83'; Hujber (yellow card) 86'	Report	Senić (yellow card) 5', (goal) 37'; Kolarić (yellow card) 64'	Stadium: Stadion Aldo Drosina; Attendance: 0 Referee: Duje Strukan

19 September 2020 5	Gorica	2–2	Istra 1961	Velika Gorica
17:00 CEST (UTC+02:00)	Špikić (yellow card) 11' (goal) 29'; Lovrić (yellow card) 56'; Steenvoorden (red card) 73'; Delfi 89'	Report	Gržan (yellow card) 7' (goal) 76' (pen.); Vuk 11'; Galilea (yellow card) 30'; Tomašević (yellow card) 41'	Stadium: Stadion Radnik; Attendance: 837; Referee: Dario Bel

26 September 2020 6	Istra 1961	1–0	Šibenik	Pula
17:00 CEST (UTC+02:00)	Ivančić 39'; Sergi (yellow card) 76'; Bosančić (yellow card) 82'	Report	Bilić (yellow card) 69'	Stadium: Stadion Aldo Drosina; Attendance: 761; Referee: Igor Pajač

2 October 2020 7	Lokomotiva	0–0	Istra 1961	Zagreb
18:00 CEST (UTC+02:00)	Karačić (yellow card) 46'; Kallaku (yellow card) 48'; Đira (yellow card) 51'; Sammir (yellow card) 68'	Report	Galilea (yellow card) 18'; Bosančić (yellow card) 44'	Stadium: Stadion Kranjčevićeva; Attendance: 330; Referee: Tihomir Pejin

16 October 2020 8	Slaven Belupo	5–1	Istra 1961	Koprivnica
18:00 CEST (UTC+02:00)	Božić 31' 45+2'; Krstanović 50' (pen.); Mlinar (yellow card) 53'; Glavčić 61'; Boakye 79'	Report	Vuk 85'	Stadium: Gradski stadion Attendance: 308; Referee: Zdenko Lovrić

31 October 2020 10	Istra 1961	1–0	Hajduk Split	Pula
17:05 CEST (UTC+02:00)	Sergi (yellow card) 44'; Halilović (yellow card) 56'; Galilea (yellow card) 75'; Vuk 86'	Report	Jradi (yellow card) 35'; Caktaš (yellow card) 90+6'	Stadium: Stadion Aldo Drosina; Attendance: 0 Referee: Tihomir Pejin

8 November 2020 11	Dinamo Zagreb	5–0	Istra 1961	Zagreb
15:00 CET (UTC+01:00)	Gavranović 6', 75'; Jakić 45+1'; Oršić 76'; Tolić 87'	Report	Bosančić (yellow card) 72'	Stadium: Stadion Maksimir; Attendance: 0 Referee: Mario Zebec

25 November 2020 9	Istra 1961	1–4	Osijek	Pula
17:00 CET (UTC+01:00)	Špoljarić 7'; Vuk (yellow card) 34'; Blagojević (yellow card) 44'; Perera (yellow card) 45+1'	Report	Miérez 31' (yellow card) 52'; Bohar 45' (pen.); Žaper 68'; Erceg (yellow card) 74' (goal) 75'; Talys (yellow card) 84'	Stadium: Stadion Aldo Drosina; Attendance: 0 Referee: Goran Pečarić

28 November 2020 13	Varaždin	1–1	Istra 1961	Varaždin
15:00 CET (UTC+01:00)	Obregón 51'; Benko (yellow card) 85'	Report	Blagojević (yellow card) 67'; Perera (yellow card) 81'; Bosančić (yellow card) 89'; Gržan 90+7' (pen.)	Stadium: Stadion Varteks; Attendance: 0 Referee: Igor Pajač

19 January 2021 14	Istra 1961	1–1	Gorica	Pula
16:00 CET (UTC+01:00)	Špoljarić (yellow card) 52'; Vuk 57'; Galilea (yellow card) 90'	Report	Golubickas (yellow card) 9'; Jovičić 68'	Stadium: Stadion Aldo Drosina; Attendance: 0 Referee: Ivan Vučković

24 January 2021 17	Istra 1961	2–1	Slaven Belupo	Pula
17:05 CET (UTC+01:00)	Tomašević (yellow card) 37'; Galilea (yellow card) 57'; Hujber (yellow card) 67'; Špoljarić 81' (pen.) 90+1' (pen.); Šutalo (yellow card) 87'	Report	Glavčić 10'; Goda (yellow card) 28'; Bogojević (yellow card) 40'; Bačelić-Grgić (yellow card) 45+1'; van Bruggen (yellow card) 80'	Stadium: Stadion Aldo Drosina; Attendance: 0 Referee: Igor Pajač

27 January 2021 12	Istra 1961	1–2	Rijeka	Pula
15:00 CET (UTC+01:00)	Ivančić (yellow card) 32'; Špoljarić 38'; Bosančić (yellow card) 40'	Report	Andrijašević 29' 65' (pen.); Smolčić (red card) 82'	Stadium: Aldo Drosina; Attendance: 0 Referee: Ivan Vučković

30 January 2021 18	Osijek	1–0	Istra 1961	Osijek
15:00 CET (UTC+01:00)	Miérez (yellow card) 6' (goal) 30' (pen.); Žaper (yellow card) 86'; Jurčević (yellow card) 89'	Report	Lončar (yellow card) 13'; Tomašević (yellow card) 45+3'; Hujber (yellow card) 52'; G. Kim (yellow card) 88'; Šutalo (yellow card) 90+4'	Stadium: Gradski Vrt Stadium; Attendance: 0 Referee: Duje Strukan

3 February 2021 19	Hajduk Split	1–0	Istra 1961	Split
19:10 CET (UTC+01:00)	Nayir 16' (yellow card) 66'; Atanasov (yellow card) 45+1'	Report	Vojković (yellow card) 7'; Tomašević (yellow card) 25'	Stadium: Poljud; Attendance: 0 Referee: Zdenko Lovrić

7 February 2021 20	Istra 1961	0–1	Dinamo Zagreb	Pula
17:05 CET (UTC+01:00)	Tomašević (yellow card) 46'; Perera (yellow card) 56'; Šutalo (yellow card) 81'	Report	Jakić (yellow card) 35'; Atiemwen 36'	Stadium: Stadion Aldo Drosina; Attendance: 0 Referee: Zdenko Lovrić

10 February 2021 15	Šibenik	1–0	Istra 1961	Šibenik
16:00 CET (UTC+01:00)	Mesa (yellow card) 39'; Jurić 52' (yellow card) 56'; E. Sahiti (yellow card) 71'	Report	Bosančić (yellow card) 44'; Galilea (yellow card) 90+3'	Stadium: Stadion Šubićevac; Attendance: 0 Referee: Tihomir Pejin

14 February 2021 21	Rijeka	1–1	Istra 1961	Rijeka
15:00 CET (UTC+01:00)	Murić 8'; Pavičić (yellow card) 9'; Arsenić (yellow card) 26'; Mudražija (yellow card) 32'; Vukčević (yellow card) 78'; Lončar (yellow card) 90+3'	Report	Gržan 5'; Sergi (yellow card) 16'; Tomašević (yellow card) 34'; Galilea (yellow card) 46'; Bosančić (yellow card) 70'; Hujber (yellow card) 86'; Lučić (yellow card) 90+4'	Stadium: Stadion Rujevica; Attendance: 0 Referee: Dario Kulušić

20 February 2020 22	Istra 1961	0–1	Varaždin	Pula
15:00 CET (UTC+01:00)	Galilea (yellow card) 65'; Tomašević (yellow card) 87'	Report	Grgec (yellow card) 50'; Stolnik (red card) 58'; Obregón (yellow card) 70'; Senić 89'; Urata (yellow card) 90+2'; Herrera (yellow card) 90+5'	Stadium: Stadion Aldo Drosina; Attendance: 0 Referee: Fran Jović

28 February 2021 23	Gorica	2–1	Istra 1961	Velika Gorica
15:00 CET (UTC+01:00)	Lovrić 50' (yellow card) 54'; Jovičić (yellow card) 52'; Mudrinski 73'	Report	Bandé 25'; Perera (yellow card) 62'	Stadium: Stadion Radnik; Attendance: 0 Referee: Zdenko Lovrić

5 March 2021 24	Istra 1961	3–2	Šibenik	Pula
18:00 CET (UTC+01:00)	Gržan 55' (pen.); Ivančić 57'; Hara 63'	Report	Todoroski (yellow card) 25'; E. Sahiti (yellow card) 41' (goal) 44'; Bulat 75'	Stadium: Stadion Aldo Drosina; Attendance: 0 Referee: Dario Bel

10 March 2021 16	Istra 1961	3–1	Lokomotiva	Pula
17:00 CET (UTC+01:00)	Ivančić 20' 53'; Vuk 40'; Galilea (yellow card) 45'; Blagojević (yellow card) 56'	Report	Hadžić 28'; Çokaj (yellow card) 37'; Pivarić (yellow card) 42'; Papadopoulos (yellow card) 56'; Maleš (yellow card) 67'; Santini (yellow card) 90+4'	Stadium: Stadion Aldo Drosina; Attendance: 0 Referee: Duje Strukan

13 March 2021 25	Lokomotiva	0–1	Istra 1961	Zagreb
15:00 CET (UTC+01:00)	Marin (yellow card) 55'; Lešković (yellow card) 82'	Report	Navarro 38'; Bosančić (yellow card) 73'	Stadium: Stadion Kranjčevićeva; Attendance: 0 Referee: Duje Strukan

20 March 2021 26	Slaven Belupo	1–1	Istra 1961	Koprivnica
15:00 CET (UTC+01:00)	Iličić 27'; Goda (yellow card) 44'; Knöll (yellow card) 59'; Bosec (yellow card) 80'; Paracki (yellow card) 85'; Glavčić (yellow card) 85'	Report	Blagojević (yellow card) 25'; Gržan 45' (pen.); Bandé (yellow card) 50'; Perković (yellow card) 56'	Stadium: Gradski stadion Attendance: 0 Referee: Fran Jović

3 April 2021 27	Istra 1961	0–2	Osijek	Pula
15:00 CEST (UTC+02:00)	Bosančić (yellow card) 12'	Report	Miérez 30'; Erceg 88'	Stadium: Stadion Aldo Drosina; Attendance: 0 Referee: Fran Jović

11 April 2021 28	Istra 1961	0–1	Hajduk Split	Pula
17:05 CEST (UTC+02:00)	Sergi (yellow card) 6'; Blagojević (yellow card) 25' (yellow-red card) 88'; Halilović (yellow card) 33'; Navarro (yellow card) 45+2'; Bandé (yellow card) 53'; Gržan (yellow card) 86'	Report	Nayir (yellow card) 52'; Simić 68'; Kalinić (yellow card) 90+4'	Stadium: Stadion Aldo Drosina; Attendance: 0 Referee: Marko Matoc

18 April 2021 29	Dinamo Zagreb	1–0	Istra 1961	Zagreb
19:05 CEST (UTC+02:00)	Petković 38' (pen.); Gavranović (yellow card) 60'; Stojanović (yellow card) 80'; Burton (red card) 84'	Report	Galilea (yellow card) 37'; Blagojević (yellow card) 69'; Gržan (yellow card) 80'	Stadium: Stadion Maksimir; Attendance: 0 Referee: Igor Pajač

21 April 2021 30	Istra 1961	1–2	Rijeka	Pula
18:05 CEST (UTC+02:00)	Galilea 44'	Report	Murić 20'; Gnezda Čerin (yellow card) 32'; Kulenović 36'	Stadium: Stadion Aldo Drosina; Attendance: 0 Referee: Dario Bel

26 April 2021 31	Varaždin	1–1	Istra 1961	Varaždin
18:00 CEST (UTC+02:00)	Guera Djou (yellow card) 27' (yellow-red card) 81'; Posavec 34'; Peco (yellow card) 45'; Senić (yellow card) 88'	Report	Hara 18' (yellow card) 30'; Levitt (yellow card) 72'; Galilea (yellow card) 83'	Stadium: Stadion Varteks; Attendance: 0 Referee: Dario Bel

2 May 2021 32	Istra 1961	0–2	Gorica	Pula
17:00 CEST (UTC+02:00)	Silva (yellow card) 18'; Hujber (yellow card) 62' (yellow-red card) 79'; Lončar (yellow card) 86'; Tomašević (yellow card) 87'	Report	Martinsson Ngouali (yellow card) 39'; Špikić 42'; Delfi (yellow card) 51'; Babec (yellow card) 59'; Krizmanić (yellow card) 83'; Mitrović 90+4'	Stadium: Stadion Aldo Drosina; Attendance: 0 Referee: Duje Strukan

7 May 2021 33	Šibenik	1–0	Istra 1961	Šibenik
17:05 CEST (UTC+02:00)	Ćurić (yellow card) 32'; S. Sahiti 48'; Bailone (red card) 73'	Report		Stadium: Stadion Šubićevac; Attendance: 0 Referee: Fran Jović

11 May 2021 34	Istra 1961	1–1	Lokomotiva	Pula
17:00 CEST (UTC+02:00)	Blagojević (yellow card) 31'; Sergi 45+2'	Report	Maleš (yellow card) 28'; Pivarić 38' (pen.) (yellow card) 87'; Kačavenda (yellow card) 44'; Šimić (yellow card) 48'; Cipetić (yellow card) 54'; Lešković (yellow card) 57'; Çokaj (yellow card) 79'	Stadium: Stadion Aldo Drosina; Attendance: 0 Referee: Ivan Bebek

15 May 2021 35	Istra 1961	1–0	Slaven Belupo	Pula
17:00 CEST (UTC+02:00)	Hara (yellow card) 32'; Vuk 46'; Gržan (yellow card) 79'; Hujber (yellow card) 84'; Lučić (yellow card) 89'; Sergi (yellow card) 89'	Report	Bogojević (yellow card) 45'	Stadium: Stadion Aldo Drosina; Attendance: 0 Referee: Mario Zebec

23 May 2021 36	Osijek	2–1	Istra 1961	Osijek
17:00 CEST (UTC+02:00)	Kleinheisler 34'; Beljo 90+2'	Report	Ivančić 41'; Sergi (yellow card) 65'; Hujber (yellow card) 90+2'	Stadium: Gradski Vrt Stadium; Attendance: 0 Referee: Duje Strukan

Source: Croatian Football Federation

=== Croatian Football Cup ===
7 October 2020 R1	Polet Sveti Martin na Muri	0–2	Istra 1961	Sveti Martin na Muri
15:00 CEST (UTC+02:00)	Šarić (yellow card) 31'; Škvorc (yellow card) 78'	Report	Hujber (yellow card) 3'; Vojković (yellow card) 23'; Bosančić (yellow card) 80'; Guzina 86'; Špoljarić 90+3'	Stadium: NK POLET (SMnM); Attendance: 450; Referee: Goran Pečarić

24 February 2021 R2	Šibenik	0–2	Istra 1961	Šibenik
17:00 CET (UTC+01:00)	Bulat (yellow card) 80'; Mesa (yellow card) 89'	Report	Hara 46'; Šutalo (yellow card) 66'; Halilović (yellow card) 70'; Blagojević (yellow card) 90+1'; Lučić (yellow card) 90+4'; Gržan 90+5'	Stadium: Stadion Šubićevac; Attendance: 0 Referee: Ante Čuljak

16 March 2021 QF	Oriolik	0–3	Istra 1961	Oriovac
15:00 CET (UTC+01:00)	Stahović (yellow card) 32'; Lucić (yellow card) 37'	Report	Hara 60'; Hara 87'; Živatović 90' (o.g.)	Stadium: Oriolik; Attendance: 0 Referee: Ante Čuljak

14 April 2021 SF	Istra 1961	3–2	Rijeka	Pula
18:00 CEST (UTC+02:00)	Šutalo 7'; Hara 22', (yellow card) 68'; Guzina 44', (yellow card) 70'; Galilea (yellow card) 69'; Lučić (yellow card) 90+3'	Report	Menalo (yellow card) 18'; Drmić 52'; Velkovski (yellow card) 60'; Lončar (yellow card) 66'; Murić (yellow card) 66' (goal) 72' (pen.)	Stadium: Stadion Aldo Drosina; Attendance: 0 Referee: Duje Strukan

19 May 2021 Final	Dinamo Zagreb	6–3	Istra 1961	Velika Gorica
20:00 CEST (UTC+02:00)	Oršić 5', 74'; Ademi 9', (yellow card) 61'; Jakić (yellow card) 18'; Majer 33'; Šutalo 59' (o.g.); Théophile-Catherine (yellow card) 79'; Gavranović 84'	Report	Hara 52', 53'; Galilea (yellow card) 56'; Gržan 64' (pen.), (yellow card) 80'; Perera (yellow card) 81'	Stadium: Stadion Radnik; Attendance: 0 Referee: Duje Strukan

Source: Croatian Football Federation

== Player seasonal records ==
Updated 23 May 2021

=== Goals ===
Rank	Name	League	Cup	Total
1	(Japan) Taichi Hara	2	6	8
2	(Croatia) Šime Gržan	5	2	7
3	(Croatia) Matej Vuk	6	–	6
4	(Croatia) Antonio Ivančić	5	–	5
4	(Croatia) Josip Špoljarić	4	1	5
6	(Bosnia and Herzegovina) Gedeon Guzina	1	2	3
7	(Burkina Faso) Hassane Bandé	1	–	1
7	(Spain) Einar Galilea	1	–	1
7	(Spain) Sergi González	1	–	1
7	(Spain) Rafa Navarro	1	–	1
7	(Croatia) Josip Šutalo	–	1	1
Own goals		–	1	1
TOTALS		27	13	40

Source: Competitive matches

=== Clean sheets ===
Rank	Name	League	Cup	Total
1	(Austria) Ivan Lučić	2	1	3
2	(Croatia) Lovro Majkić	2	–	2
2	(Croatia) Lovro Juric	1	1	2
4	(Cameroon) Fabrice Ondoa	–	1	1
TOTALS		5	3	8

Source: Competitive matches

=== Disciplinary record ===
Number	Position	Player	1. HNL			Croatian Cup			Total		
Number	Position	Player	Yellow card	(yellow card) (yellow-red card)	Red card	Yellow card	(yellow card) (yellow-red card)	Red card	Yellow card	(yellow card) (yellow-red card)	Red card
1	GK	(Austria) Ivan Lučić	2	0	0	2	0	0	4	0	0
2	DF	(Croatia) Luka Hujber	6	1	0	1	0	0	7	1	0
3	DF	(Spain) Sergi González	6	0	0	0	0	0	6	0	0
4	DF	(Spain) Rafael Páez	1	0	0	0	0	0	1	0	0
6	DF	(Croatia) Petar Bosančić	10	0	0	1	0	0	11	0	0
7	FW	(Croatia) Šime Gržan	4	0	0	1	0	0	5	0	0
8	MF	(Spain) Einar Galilea	12	0	0	2	0	0	14	0	0
9	FW	(Japan) Taichi Hara	3	0	0	1	0	0	4	0	0
10	FW	(Bosnia and Herzegovina) Gedeon Guzina	1	0	0	1	0	0	2	0	0
11	FW	(Croatia) Josip Špoljarić	1	0	0	0	0	0	1	0	0
12	DF	(Spain) Rafa Navarro	1	0	0	0	0	0	1	0	0
13	MF	(South Korea) Kim Gyu-hyeong	1	0	0	0	0	0	1	0	0
14	MF	(Spain) Antonio Perera	4	0	0	1	0	0	5	0	0
18	FW	(Burkina Faso) Hassane Bandé	2	0	0	0	0	0	2	0	0
20	MF	(Croatia) Antonio Ivančić	1	0	0	0	0	0	1	0	0
22	MF	(Croatia) Matej Vuk	1	0	0	0	0	0	1	0	0
23	MF	(Montenegro) Stefan Lončar	2	0	0	0	0	0	2	0	0
24	MF	(Croatia) Dino Halilović	2	0	0	1	0	0	3	0	0
26	MF	(Ghana) Obeng Regan	1	0	0	0	0	0	1	0	0
27	DF	(Croatia) Josip Tomašević	9	0	0	0	0	0	9	0	0
30	DF	(Austria) Mario Lovre Vojković	1	0	0	1	0	0	2	0	0
37	DF	(Croatia) Josip Šutalo	3	0	0	1	0	0	4	0	0
39	DF	(Croatia) Mauro Perković	1	0	0	0	0	0	1	0	0
44	DF	(Portugal) João Silva	1	0	0	0	0	0	1	0	0
63	MF	(Wales) Dylan Levitt	1	0	0	0	0	0	1	0	0
77	MF	(Croatia) Slavko Blagojević	9	1	0	1	0	0	10	1	0
TOTALS			86	2	0	14	0	0	100	2	0

=== Appearances and goals ===
Number	Position	Player	Apps	Goals	Apps	Goals	Apps	Goals
Number	Position	Player	Total		1. HNL (Note: First number represents appearances in starting eleven, while the second number indicates a substitute appearance.)		Croatian Cup	
1	GK	(Austria) Ivan Lučić	26	0	23+0	0	3+0	0
2	DF	(Croatia) Luka Hujber	25	0	17+5	0	3+0	0
3	DF	(Spain) Sergi González	25	1	22+2	1	1+0	0
4	DF	(Spain) Rafael Páez	9	0	7+2	0	0+0	0
5	DF	(South Korea) Kim Hyun-woo	6	0	1+4	0	1+0	0
5	DF	(North Macedonia) Agron Rufati	1	0	0+1	0	0+0	0
6	DF	(Croatia) Petar Bosančić	24	0	19+1	0	4+0	0
7	FW	(Croatia) Šime Gržan	38	7	32+1	5	2+3	2
8	MF	(Spain) Einar Galilea	27	1	25+0	1	2+0	0
9	MF	(Spain) Adrián Fuentes	12	0	4+7	0	1+0	0
9	FW	(Japan) Taichi Hara	18	8	14+0	2	3+1	6
10	FW	(Bosnia and Herzegovina) Gedeon Guzina	29	3	12+14	1	2+1	2
11	FW	(Croatia) Josip Špoljarić	30	5	15+10	4	3+2	1
12	DF	(Spain) Rafa Navarro	20	1	15+2	1	2+1	0
13	MF	(South Korea) Kim Gyu-hyeong	5	0	1+3	0	0+1	0
14	MF	(Spain) Antonio Perera	18	0	8+6	0	1+3	0
16	GK	(Cameroon) Fabrice Ondoa	1	0	0+0	0	1+0	0
17	MF	(Senegal) Arona Sané	15	0	5+9	0	1+0	0
18	FW	(Burkina Faso) Hassane Bandé	20	1	10+6	1	1+3	0
18	FW	(Croatia) Robert Perić-Komšić	1	0	0+1	0	0+0	0
20	MF	(Croatia) Antonio Ivančić	31	5	20+7	5	2+2	0
21	GK	(Croatia) Lovro Majkić	8	0	8+0	0	0+0	0
22	MF	(Croatia) Matej Vuk	30	6	21+5	6	3+1	0
23	MF	(Montenegro) Stefan Lončar	27	0	12+13	0	2+0	0
24	MF	(Croatia) Dino Halilović	21	0	6+11	0	3+1	0
26	MF	(Ghana) Obeng Regan	2	0	2+0	0	0+0	0
27	DF	(Croatia) Josip Tomašević	23	0	19+1	0	3+0	0
28	MF	(Venezuela) Octavio Páez	2	0	0+2	0	0+0	0
28	FW	(Croatia) Leon Šipoš	10	0	2+7	0	0+1	0
30	DF	(Austria) Mario Lovre Vojković	5	0	2+1	0	2+0	0
33	MF	(Albania) Drilon Sadiku	2	0	0+2	0	0+0	0
34	MF	(Croatia) Mateo Lisica	19	0	7+10	0	2+0	0
36	FW	(Croatia) Marko Bibić	1	0	0+1	0	0+0	0
37	DF	(Croatia) Josip Šutalo	26	1	22+0	0	4+0	1
39	DF	(Croatia) Mauro Perković	6	0	4+2	0	0+0	0
44	DF	(Portugal) João Silva	11	0	6+4	0	1+0	0
63	MF	(Wales) Dylan Levitt	9	0	2+5	0	2+0	0
77	MF	(Croatia) Slavko Blagojević	32	0	28+1	0	1+2	0
96	GK	(Croatia) Lovro Juric	6	0	5+0	0	1+0	0
