= Dylan Levitt =

Welsh footballer (born 2000)

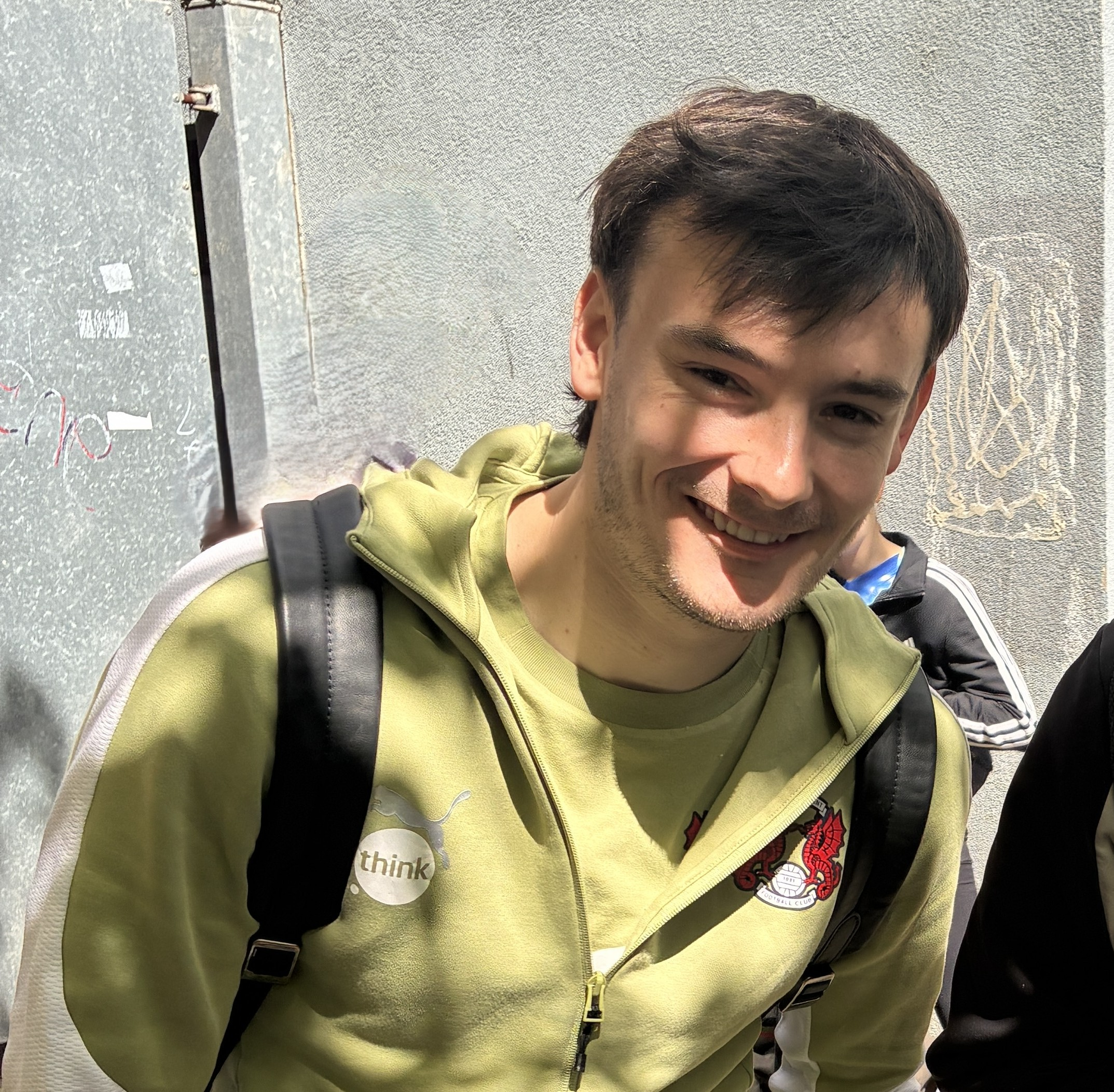
- Levitt with Leyton Orient in 2026

Personal information
- Full name: Dylan James Christopher Levitt
- Date of birth: 17 November 2000 (age 25)
- Place of birth: Bodelwyddan, Wales
- Height: 5 ft 11 in (1.80 m)
- Position: Midfielder

Team information
- Current team: Motherwell
- Number: 63

Youth career
- –2019: Manchester United

Senior career*
Years	Team	Apps	(Gls)
2019–2022	Manchester United	0	(0)
2020–2021	→ Charlton Athletic (loan)	3	(0)
2021	→ Istra 1961 (loan)	7	(0)
2021–2022	→ Dundee United (loan)	25	(5)
2022–2023	Dundee United	27	(5)
2023–2026	Hibernian	59	(4)
2026	Leyton Orient	8	(1)
2026–	Motherwell	2	(1)

International career^{‡}
2016	Wales U17	3	(0)
2017–2019	Wales U19	9	(0)
2019	Wales U21	1	(0)
2020–2022	Wales	13	(0)
- * Club domestic league appearances and goals as of 06:59, 6 September 2026 (UTC) ‡ National team caps and goals as of 21:11, 25 September 2022 (UTC)

Dylan James Christopher Levitt (born 17 November 2000) is a Welsh professional footballer who plays as a midfielder for Scottish Premiership club Motherwell.

Levitt is a graduate of the Manchester United youth system. He made his senior debut in a UEFA Europa League match in November 2019, which was his only first-team appearance for Manchester United. He spent time on loan at Charlton Athletic, Croatian club Istra 1961 and Scottish club Dundee United. He left Manchester United in July 2022 and joined Dundee United on a permanent deal. Levitt moved to Hibernian a year later.

Levitt represented Wales at several youth levels, before making his senior international debut in a UEFA Nations League game against Finland in September 2020. He was selected for the Wales squads that played in UEFA Euro 2020 and the 2022 FIFA World Cup.

== Club career ==
=== Manchester United ===
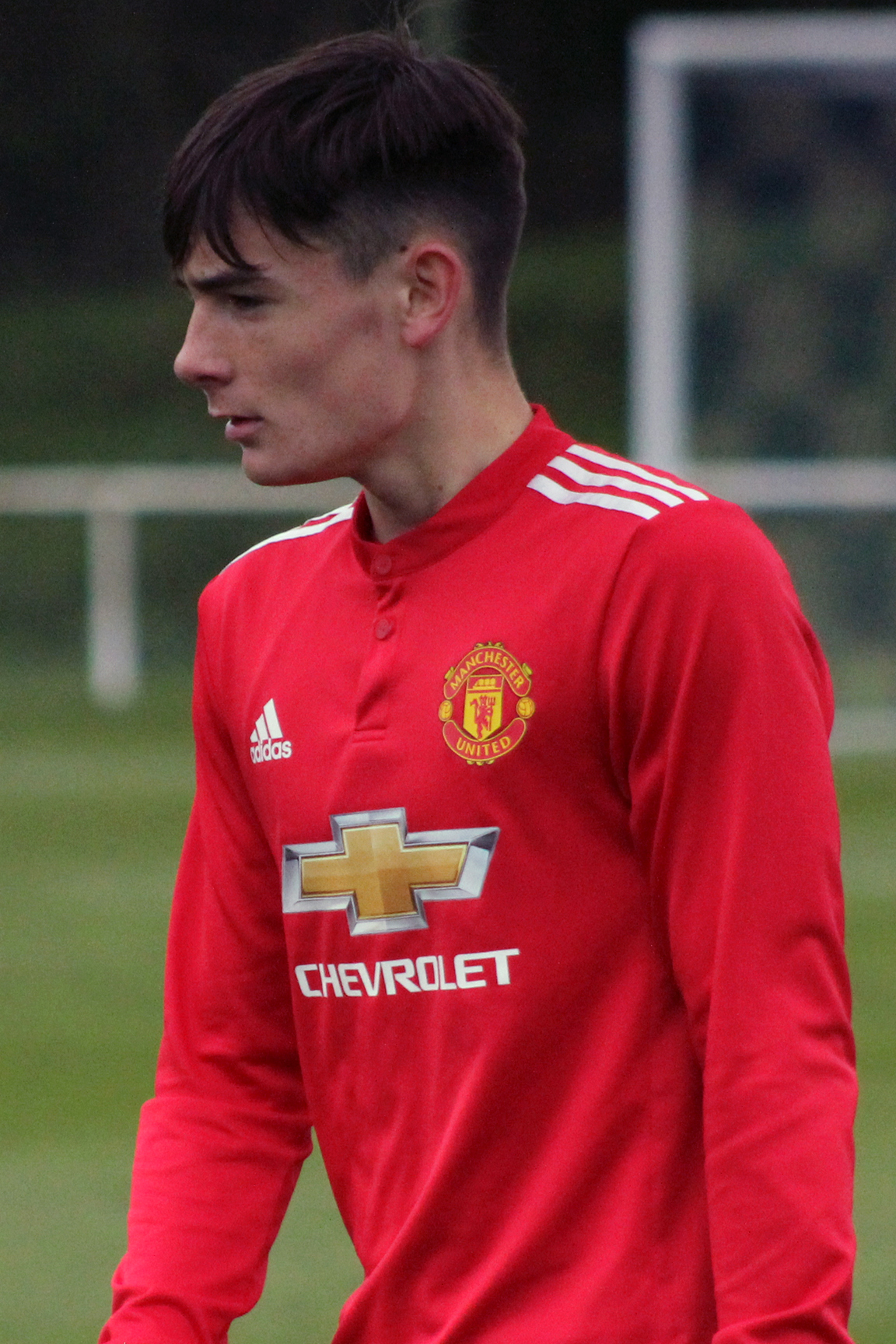
Levitt with Manchester United U18 in 2017.

Levitt joined the Manchester United youth system at the age of eight and signed his first professional contract with the club in April 2018. In November 2019, he signed a new contract with the club until June 2022. He made his senior debut with United in a UEFA Europa League match against Astana on 28 November 2019.

On 8 September 2020, Levitt was sent on a season-long loan to Charlton Athletic. On 8 January 2021, it was reported that Levitt's loan at Charlton Athletic had been cut short after he made only five first-team appearances at the League One club.

On 15 February 2021, Levitt joined Prva HNL side Istra 1961 on loan for the remainder of the 2020–21 season. On 14 April, he was unexpectedly given a chance by coach Danijel Jumić in the Croatian Cup semi-final against Rijeka, being named in the starting lineup. He played until 64th minute when he was replaced by Dino Halilović, as Istra managed to pull off an upset 3–2 win and qualify for the final.

=== Dundee United ===
On 20 August 2021, Levitt joined Scottish Premiership club Dundee United on a season-long loan. After scoring six goals in 29 league and cup appearances for the Tangerines, including an extra-time winner against Kilmarnock in the fourth round of the 2021–22 Scottish Cup, and three in the final five league matches to help Dundee United qualify for European football, Levitt was voted the fans' player of the year.

Levitt then joined Dundee United on a two-year deal in July 2022, and later extended this contract by one year. United were relegated from the Premiership after the 2022–23 season, and in July 2023 the club accepted an offer of around £300,000 for him from Hibernian.

=== Hibernian ===
Levitt signed a three-year contract with Scottish Premiership club Hibernian on 5 July 2023.

=== Leyton Orient ===
In February 2026 Levitt joined EFL League One club Leyton Orient on a 18 month contract.

=== Motherwell ===
On 1 September 2026, Scottish Premiership club Motherwell announced the signing of Levitt from Leyton Orient for an undisclosed fee, to a two-year contract with the club holding the option of an additional year.

== International career ==
Levitt represented Wales at under-17, under-19 and under-21 levels. In May 2019, he was called up to the Wales senior squad for the first time. He made his debut on 3 September 2020, in a 1–0 2020–21 UEFA Nations League B away win against Finland. In May 2021, he was selected in Wales' 26-man squad for UEFA Euro 2020. He made his tournament debut as a late substitute in Wales' 1–0 defeat against Italy in Rome. In November 2022, he was named in the Wales squad for the 2022 FIFA World Cup.

== Career statistics ==
=== Club ===
As of match played 15 May 2024

Appearances and goals by club, season and competition
Club	Season	League			National cup (Note: Includes FA Cup, Croatian Cup and Scottish Cup)		League cup (Note: Includes EFL Cup and Scottish League Cup)		Continental		Other		Total	
Club	Season	Division	Apps	Goals	Apps	Goals	Apps	Goals	Apps	Goals	Apps	Goals	Apps	Goals
Manchester United U21	2019–20	—	—		—		—		—		2 (Note: Appearances in EFL Trophy)	0	2	0
Manchester United	2019–20	Premier League	0	0	0	0	0	0	1 (Note: Appearance in UEFA Europa League)	0	—		1	0
Manchester United	2020–21	Premier League	0	0	0	0	0	0	0	0	—		0	0
Manchester United	2021–22	Premier League	0	0	0	0	0	0	0	0	—		0	0
Manchester United	Total		0	0	0	0	0	0	1	0	—		1	0
Charlton Athletic (loan)	2020–21	League One	3	0	1	0	1	0	—		0	0	5	0
Istra 1961 (loan)	2020–21	Prva HNL	7	0	2	0	—		—		—		9	0
Dundee United (loan)	2021–22	Scottish Premiership	25	5	3	1	1	0	—		—		29	6
Dundee United	2022–23	Scottish Premiership	27	5	2	0	2	0	2 (Note: Appearances in UEFA Europa Conference League)	0	—		33	5
Dundee United	Total		52	10	5	1	3	0	2	0	—		62	11
Hibernian	2023–24	Scottish Premiership	28	2	3	0	1	0	4	0	—		36	2
Career total			90	12	11	1	5	0	7	0	2	0	115	13

=== International ===
As of match played 25 September 2022

Appearances and goals by national team and year
National team	Year	Apps	Goals
Wales	2020	5	0
Wales	2021	5	0
Wales	2022	3	0
Total		13	0
