= 2021 Croatian Football Cup final =

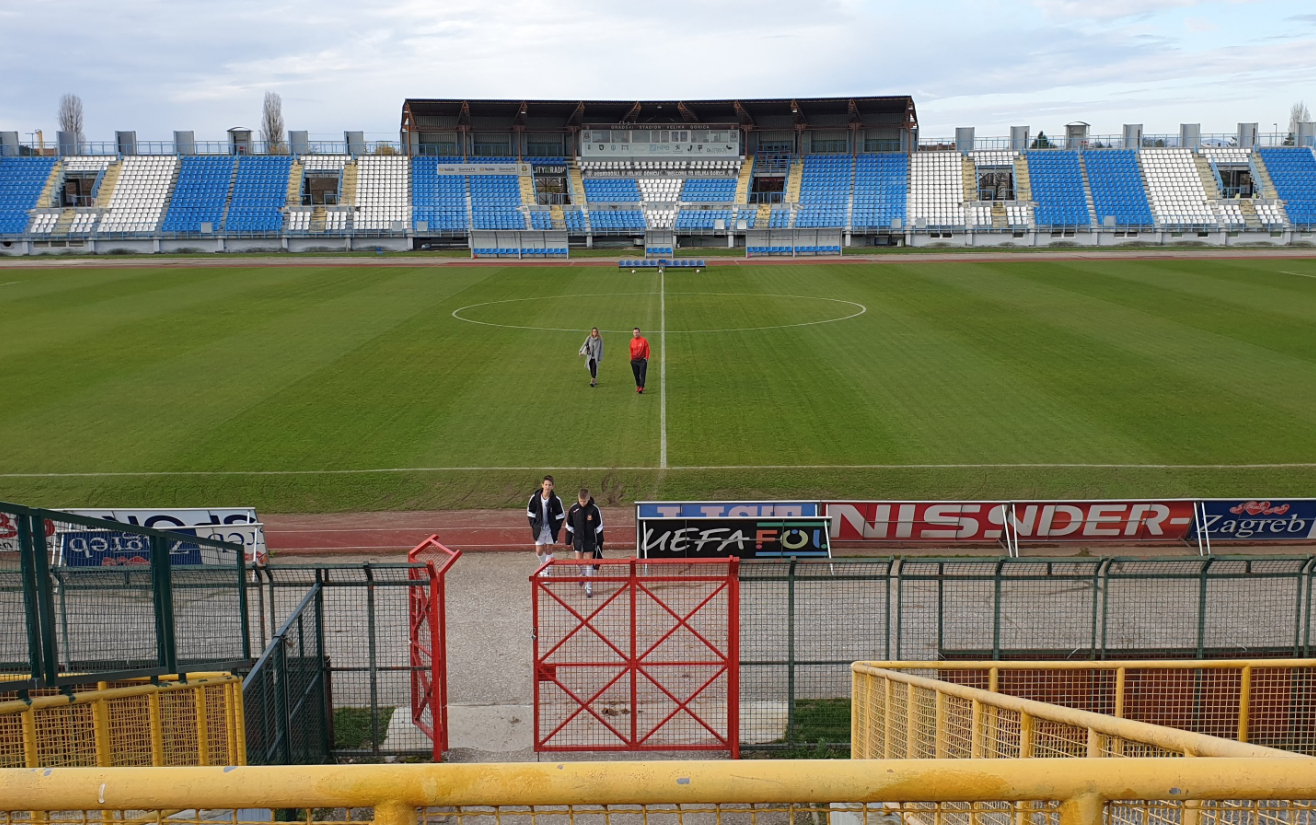
- Stadion Radnik in Velika Gorica hosted the final
- Event: 2020–21 Croatian Cup
Dinamo Zagreb	Istra 1961
Prva HNL	Prva HNL
6	3
- Date: 19 May 2021
- Venue: Stadion Radnik, Velika Gorica
- Referee: Duje Strukan (Split)
- Attendance: 0 (Note: The match was played behind closed doors due to the COVID-19 pandemic in Croatia.)

The 2021 Croatian Cup final between Dinamo Zagreb and Istra 1961 was played on 19 May 2021 in Velika Gorica.

== Road to the final ==
Dinamo Zagreb		Round	Istra 1961	
Opponent	Result		Opponent	Result
Bye		Preliminary round	Bye	
NK Ferdinandovac	7–1	First round	Polet Sveti Martin na Muri	2–0
Rudeš	2–0	Second round	Šibenik	2−0
Slaven Belupo	2–0	Quarter-finals	Oriolik	3–0
Gorica	4–1 (a.e.t.)	Semi-finals	Rijeka	3–2

== Match details ==
19 May 2021
20:00 CEST

Dinamo Zagreb	6–3	Istra 1961
Oršić 5', 75'; Ademi 9'; Majer 33'; Šutalo 59' (o.g.); Gavranović 84'	Report	Hara 52', 53'; Gržan 63' (pen.)

Stadion Radnik, Velika Gorica
Attendance: 0
Referee: Duje Strukan (Split)

Dinamo Zagreb	Istra 1961

GK	1	(Croatia) Danijel Zagorac
RB	13	(North Macedonia) Stefan Ristovski
CB	6	(Denmark) Rasmus Lauritsen
CB	28	(France) Kévin Théophile-Catherine	(yellow card) 79'
LB	32	(Croatia) Joško Gvardiol
CM	5	(North Macedonia) Arijan Ademi (c)	(yellow card) 61'
CM	97	(Croatia) Kristijan Jakić	(yellow card) 19'	(substituted off) 62'
RW	17	(Croatia) Luka Ivanušec		(substituted off) 73'
AM	10	(Croatia) Lovro Majer		(substituted off) 85'
LW	99	(Croatia) Mislav Oršić		(substituted off) 85'
CF	21	(Croatia) Bruno Petković		(substituted off) 62'
Substitutes:
GK	40	(Croatia) Dominik Livaković
DF	30	(Slovenia) Petar Stojanović
DF	22	(Croatia) Marin Leovac
MF	38	(Croatia) Bartol Franjić		(substituted on) 85'
MF	27	(Croatia) Josip Mišić		(substituted on) 62'
MF	24	(Croatia) Marko Tolić		(substituted on) 73'
FW	11	(Switzerland) Mario Gavranović		(substituted on) 62'
FW	20	(Kosovo) Lirim Kastrati		(substituted on) 85'
FW	8	(Bosnia and Herzegovina) Izet Hajrović
Manager:
(Croatia) Damir Krznar

GK	1	(Austria) Ivan Lučić
RB	2	(Croatia) Luka Hujber
CB	37	(Croatia) Josip Šutalo
CB	27	(Croatia) Josip Tomašević
LB	3	(Spain) Sergi González
CM	8	(Spain) Einar Galilea	(yellow card) 56'	(substituted off) 64'
CM	24	(Croatia) Dino Halilović (c)		(substituted off) 64'
RW	7	(Croatia) Šime Gržan	(yellow card) 80'	(substituted off) 85'
AM	20	(Croatia) Antonio Ivančić		(substituted off) 70'
LW	22	(Croatia) Matej Vuk		(substituted off) 85'
CF	9	(Japan) Taichi Hara
Substitutes:
GK	16	(Cameroon) Fabrice Ondoa
DF	39	(Croatia) Mauro Perković
DF	44	(Portugal) João Silva
MF	14	(Spain) Antonio Perera	(yellow card) 81'	(substituted on) 64'
MF	23	(Montenegro) Stefan Lončar
MF	77	(Croatia) Slavko Blagojević		(substituted on) 64'
FW	18	(Burkina Faso) Hassane Bandé		(substituted on) 70'
FW	11	(Croatia) Josip Špoljarić		(substituted on) 85'
FW	34	(Croatia) Mateo Lisica		(substituted on) 85'
Manager:
(Croatia) Danijel Jumić

Assistant referees:
Bojan Zobenica (Velika Gorica)
Ivan Mihalj (Velika Gorica)
Fourth official:
Igor Pajač (Sveti Ivan Zelina)
Video assistant referee:
Ivan Bebek (Rijeka)
Assistant video assistant referee:
Robi Kezele (Rijeka)

Match rules

- 90 minutes.
- 30 minutes of extra-time if necessary.
- Penalty shoot-out if scores still level.
- Nine named substitutes.
- Maximum of five substitutions.
