= Jurica Vručina =

Croatian footballer (born 1989)

Personal information
- Date of birth: 21 October 1989 (age 37)
- Place of birth: Varaždin, SFR Yugoslavia
- Positions: Defender; forward

Team information
- Current team: NK Međimurec Dunjkovec-Pretetinec

Senior career*
Years	Team	Apps	(Gls)
	Slaven Belupo	0	(0)
- Međimurje
2009-2011	Podravina		
2011	Rudeš		
2012	Ivančica		
2012	Tomori	4	(0)
2013-2014	Međimurje		
2014-2015	Nedelišće		
2016	SC Kemeten	14	(7)
2016-2017	SVH Waldbach-Wenigzell	24	(4)
2017-2019	Mönichkirchen FC	46	(60)
2019	SV Mühldorf	22	(33)
2019-2021	Union Großsteinbach	33	(37)
2022	Sc St.Margarethen/Raab	11	(11)
2022–	NK Međimurec DP		
- * Club domestic league appearances and goals

Jurica Vrucina (born 31 October 1989 in Croatia) is a Croatian footballer who plays for NK Međimurec Dunjkovec-Pretetinec.

== Career ==
Vrucina started his senior career with NK Slaven Belupo. In 2012, he signed for Albanian Superliga club FK Tomori Berat, where he made four appearances and scored zero goals. After that, he played for Croatian clubs NK Međimurje and NK Nedelišće and Austrian clubs SC Kemeten, SVH Waldbach, Mönichkirchen, SV Mühldorf, and Union Großsteinbach.
