= Josip Tomašević =

Josip Tomašević may refer to:

- Josip Tomašević (footballer, born 1993), Croatian footballer
- Josip Tomašević (footballer, born 1994), Croatian footballer
- Josip Jozo Tomašević (1908–1994), American economist and historian
