= 2020–21 Croatian Football Cup =

Tournament details
- Country: Croatia
- Teams: 48

Final positions
- Champions: Dinamo Zagreb
- Runners-up: Istra 1961

Tournament statistics
- Matches played: 46
- Goals scored: 188 (4.09 per match)
- Top goal scorer(s): Luka Menalo; Taichi Hara; Martin Šaban (6 each)

The 2020–21 Croatian Football Cup was the thirtieth season of Croatia's football knockout competition. The defending champions were Rijeka, having won their sixth title the previous year by defeating Lokomotiva in the final.

== Calendar ==
Round	Date(s)	Number of fixtures	Clubs	New entries this round	Goals / games
Preliminary round	9 September 2020	16	48 → 32	32	70 / 16
First round	7 October 2020	16	32 → 16	16	64 / 15
Second round	16 December 2020	8	16 → 8	none	24 / 8
Quarter-finals	3 March 2021	4	8 → 4	none	11 / 4
Semi-finals	7, 14 or 28 April	2	4 → 2	none	10 / 2
Final	19 May 2021	1	2 → 1	none	9 / 1

== Participating clubs ==
The following 48 teams qualified for the competition:

Best clubs by cup coefficient 16 clubs	Winners and runners up of county cups 32 clubs
Dinamo Zagreb; Rijeka; Hajduk Split; Slaven Belupo; RNK Split; Osijek; Lokomotiva; Inter Zaprešić; Istra 1961; Vinogradar; Zadar; Šibenik; Cibalia; NK Zagreb; Rudeš; Novigrad	Osijek-Baranja County cup winner: Belišće; Osijek-Baranja County cup runner up: BSK Bijelo Brdo; Zagreb County cup winner: Kurilovec; Zagreb County cup runner up: Gorica; Brod-Posavina County cup winner: Sloga Nova Gradiška; Brod-Posavina County cup runner up: Oriolik; Vukovar-Srijem County cup winner: Graničar Županja; Vukovar-Srijem County cup runner up: Dilj; Međimurje County cup winner: Polet SMnM; Međimurje County cup runner up: Rudar Mursko Središće; Koprivnica-Križevci County cup winner: Tehnika Koprivnica; Koprivnica-Križevci County cup runner up: Ferdinandovac; Istria County cup winner: Rudar Labin; Istria County cup runner up: Pazinka; Sisak-Moslavina County cup winner: Mladost Petrinja; Sisak-Moslavina County cup runner up: Segesta; Virovitica-Podravina County cup winner: Papuk Orahovica; Virovitica-Podravina County cup runner up: Virovitica; Varaždin County cup winner: Varaždin; Varaždin County cup runner up: Ivančica; Bjelovar-Bilogora County cup winner: Mladost Ždralovi; Bjelovar-Bilogora County cup runner up: Bjelovar; Split-Dalmatia County cup winner: Croatia Zmijavci; City of Zagreb cup winner: Sesvete; Primorje-Gorski Kotar County cup winner: Crikvenica; Požega-Slavonia County cup winner: Slavonija; Zadar County cup winner: Primorac Biograd na Moru; Karlovac County cup winner: Karlovac 1919; Dubrovnik-Neretva County cup winner: GOŠK 1919 Dubrovnik; Krapina-Zagorje County cup winner: Gaj Mače; Šibenik-Knin County cup winner: Mladost Tribunj; Lika-Senj County cup winner: Lika 95

== Preliminary round ==
The draw for the preliminary single-legged round was held on 25 August 2020 and the matches were played on 9 September 2020.

Tie no	Home team	Score	Away team
1	Oriolik	2–1	Karlovac 1919
2	Kurilovec	4–0	Papuk Orahovica
3	Dilj	1–0	Virovitica
4	Pazinka	0–2	Crikvenica
5	Graničar Županja	1–0	Slavonija Požega
6^{*}	Segesta	3–4	Croatia Zmijavci
7^{*}	Bjelovar	0–5	Varaždin
8	GOŠK 1919 Dubrovnik	4–2	BSK Bijelo Brdo
9	Gorica	1–0	Belišće
10	Rudar Labin	2–0 (a.e.t.)	Primorac Biograd
11	Gaj Mače	20–2	Lika 95
12	Sloga Nova Gradiška	0–3	Sesvete
13	Mladost Tribunj	0–2	Polet SMnM
14	Mladost Ždralovi	3–1	Mladost Petrinja
15	Ferdinandovac	3–1	Ivančica
16	Rudar Mursko Središće	3–0	Tehnika Koprivnica

* Matches played on 8 September.

== First round ==
Teams in first round were paired by club coefficient and the matches were played on 7 October 2020.

Tie no	Home team	Score	Away team
1	Dilj	0–6	Rijeka
2^{*}	Ferdinandovac	1–7	Dinamo Zagreb
3	Gaj Mače	2–3 (a.e.t.)	Lokomotiva
4^{****}	Graničar Županja	1–2	Hajduk Split
5^{**}	Rudar Mursko Središće	0–9	Slaven Belupo
6^{****}	Crikvenica	1–5	Osijek
7^{******}	Rudar Labin	2–0	Inter Zaprešić
8	Polet SMnM	0–2	Istra 1961
9	Croatia Zmijavci	0–2 (a.e.t.)	Šibenik
10	Oriolik	1–0	Split
11^{***}	Kurilovec	6–0	Vinogradar
12	GOŠK Dubrovnik	bye	Zadar
13	Mladost Ždralovi	0–1 (a.e.t.)	Zagreb
14	Sesvete	3–4	Gorica
15	Novigrad	1–3	Rudeš
16^{*****}	Varaždin	2–0	Cibalia

* Match played on 26 September.
** Match played on 29 September.
*** Match played on 30 September.
**** Matches played on 6 October.
***** Match played on 10 October.
****** Match played on 11 October. Abandoned at halftime because of bad weather. Match continued on 13 October.

== Second round ==
The second round was scheduled for 16 December 2020. The teams were drawn by tie number where winner of tie No. 1 plays against winner of tie No. 16 and so on, with bigger numbers hosting a tie.

Tie no	Home team	Score	Away team
1	Varaždin	1–2	Rijeka
2	Rudeš	0–2	Dinamo Zagreb
3^{**}	Gorica	3–1	Lokomotiva
4^{******}	Zagreb	0–3	Hajduk Split
5^{***}	GOŠK Dubrovnik	1–4	Slaven Belupo
6^{*}	Kurilovec	0–4	Osijek
7^{*****}	Oriolik	1–0(a.e.t.)	Rudar Labin
8^{****}	Šibenik	0–2	Istra 1961

* Match played on 14 November.
** Match played on 7 December.
*** Match played on 23 February.
**** Match played on 24 February.
***** Match played on 28 February.
****** Match played on 2 March.

== Quarter-finals ==
The quarter-finals were scheduled for 3 March 2021.

Tie no	Home team	Score	Away team
1^{*}	Oriolik	0–3	Istra 1961
2	Dinamo Zagreb	2–0	Slaven Belupo
3	Osijek	1–2	Rijeka
4^{*}	Gorica	3–0	Hajduk Split

* Matches played on 16 March.

== Semi-finals ==
The semi-finals were scheduled for 14 April 2021. Dinamo Zagreb v HNK Gorica has been postponed due to Dinamo's participation in the 2020–21 UEFA Europa League quarter finals.

14 April 2021
18:00

Istra 1961	3–2	Rijeka
Šutalo 7'; Hara 23'; Guzina 44'	Report	Drmić 52'; Murić 72' (pen.)

Stadion Aldo Drosina, Pula
Attendance: 0 (Note: The match was played behind closed doors due to the COVID-19 pandemic in Croatia.)
Referee: Duje Strukan (Split)

28 April 2021
18:00

Dinamo Zagreb	4–1 (a.e.t.)	Gorica
Mišić 46'; Jakić 100'; Majer 110'; Ademi 118'	Report	Špikić 52'

Stadion Maksimir, Zagreb
Attendance: 0
Referee: Mario Zebec (Cestica)

== Final ==
The final was played on 19 May 2021.

19 May 2021
20:00 CEST

Dinamo Zagreb	6–3	Istra 1961
Oršić 5', 75'; Ademi 9'; Majer 33'; Šutalo 59' (o.g.); Gavranović 84'	Report	Hara 52', 53'; Gržan 63' (pen.)

Stadion Radnik, Velika Gorica
Attendance: 0
Referee: Duje Strukan (Split)

== Top scorers ==
Rank	Player	Club(s)	Goals
1	(Bosnia and Herzegovina) Luka Menalo	Dinamo Zagreb; Rijeka	6
1	(Japan) Taichi Hara	Istra 1961	6
1	(Croatia) Martin Šaban	Gaj Mače	6
4	(Croatia) Bruno Rihtar	Gaj Mače	5
5	(Croatia) Davor Iskrić	Gaj Mače	3
5	(Croatia) Tomislav Gudelj	Croatia Zmijavci	3
5	(Croatia) Filip Hodak	Kurilovec	3
5	(Croatia) Luka Sedlaček	Kurilovec	3
5	(Croatia) Mihovil Geljić	Sesvete	3
5	(Croatia) Josip Mitrović	Gorica	3
5	(Croatia) Kristijan Lovrić	Gorica	3
5	(Croatia) Luka Matić	GOŠK Dubrovnik	3
5	(Croatia) Miroslav Iličić	Slaven Belupo	3
5	(Croatia) Robert Murić	Rijeka	3
5	(North Macedonia) Arijan Ademi	Dinamo Zagreb	3
