= Neven Vukman =

Croatian football midfielder (born 1985)

Personal information
- Date of birth: 11 April 1985 (age 41)
- Place of birth: Varaždin, SFR Yugoslavia
- Height: 1.81 m (5 ft 11 1/2 in)
- Position: Defensive midfielder

Team information
- Current team: Ivančica

Youth career
- 1991–1996: Ivančica
- 1996–2002: Varteks

Senior career*
Years	Team	Apps	(Gls)
2002–2009	Varteks	85	(6)
2009–2010	Karlovac	20	(2)
2010–2012	Rijeka	29	(2)
2012	Taraz	18	(1)
2013	Varaždin	13	(1)
2014	Zelina	14	(1)
2014–2016	Istra 1961	26	(0)
2016–2017	Varteks	17	(1)
2017–2018	Allerheiligen	23	(5)
2018	TuS Greinbach	7	(0)
2019	Varteks	12	(0)
2019-	Ivančica		

International career^{‡}
2004–2006	Croatia U21	13	(2)
2006	Croatia	2	(0)
- * Club domestic league appearances and goals as of 22 January 2023 ‡ National team caps and goals as of 3 September 2006

Neven Vukman (born 11 April 1985) is a Croatian football midfielder, who is currently playing for hometown club Ivančica.

== Club career ==
A product of the NK Varteks youth academy (a club which folded in 2015, and is not associated with his 2019 club), he made his debut for the first team in 2002. He remained in the club for the following 7 seasons, showing great promise, playing for the U21 national team and debuting for the A national team, but was plagued by injuries, which made him miss the entire 2007/2008 season. In January 2009 he went for a try out with Inter Turku in Finland, but returned to Varteks and remained until the summer of 2009, when he moved to newly promoted NK Karlovac. In the summer of 2010 he was transferred to NK Rijeka.

In 2016, after a series of seasons with Taraz, Varaždin, Zelina and Istra 1961, Vukman joined the new NK Varteks, which is located in the same city and stadium (Stadion Varteks) as his original youth club of the same name.

Vukman moved to Germany's Allerheiligen, and later a team in Greinbach, Austria, before returning to the Varteks in 2019.

== International career ==
Vukman made his international debut against South Korea in the 2–0 friendly tournament loss in Hong Kong on 29 January 2006. He has made two appearances for the Croatia national football team, his final international was three days after his debut against hosts Hong Kong.
