= Einar Galilea =

Spanish footballer (born 1994)

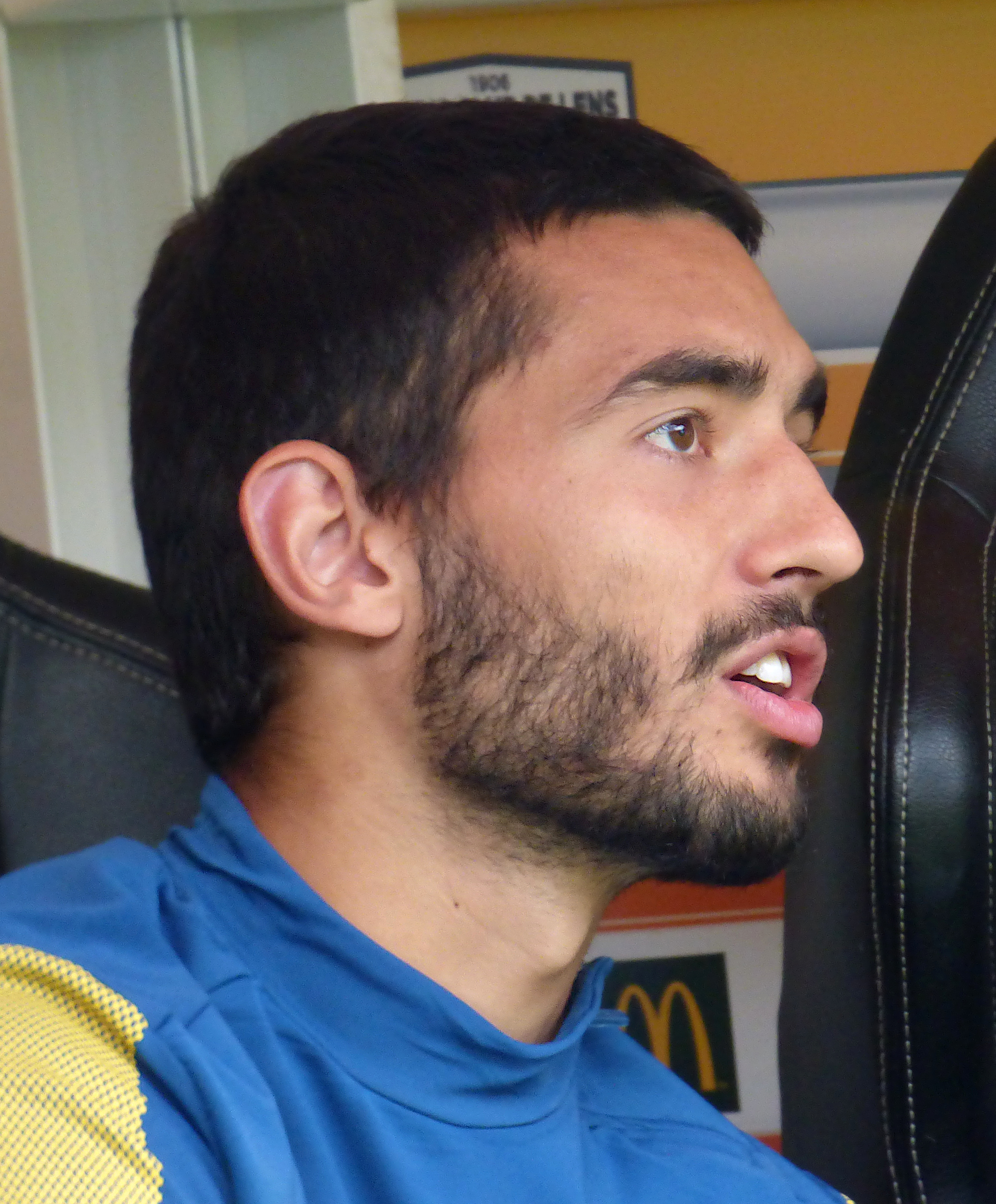
- Galilea in 2018

Personal information
- Full name: Einar Galilea Azaceta
- Date of birth: 22 May 1994 (age 32)
- Place of birth: Vitoria-Gasteiz, Spain
- Height: 1.84 m (6 ft 1/2 in)
- Positions: Centre-back; midfielder

Team information
- Current team: Málaga
- Number: 4

Youth career
- 2005-2012: Alavés

Senior career*
Years	Team	Apps	(Gls)
2012–2017	Alavés B	86	(3)
2013–2021	Alavés	22	(0)
2018	→ Rudeš (loan)	14	(1)
2018	→ Sochaux (loan)	3	(0)
2019–2021	→ Istra 1961 (loan)	68	(1)
2021–2023	Istra 1961	63	(4)
2023–	Málaga	76	(4)

International career^{‡}
2026–	Basque Country	1	(0)
- * Club domestic league appearances and goals as of 19 August 2026 ‡ National team caps and goals as of 14 November 2026

Einar Galilea Azaceta (born 22 May 1994) is a Spanish professional footballer who plays for Spanish club Málaga CF as either a centre-back or a midfielder.

Formed at Alavés, he spent part of his career in the Croatian Football League, making over 100 appearances mainly for Istra 1961 and also for Rudeš.

== Career ==
=== Alavés ===
Born in Vitoria-Gasteiz, Álava, Galilea finished his formation with his hometown club Deportivo Alavés, and made his senior debut with the reserves in the 2012–13 campaign. On 19 May 2013, as the Basque side were already in the play-offs, he made his first team debut, coming on as a substitute in a 3–1 win at CD Izarra.

On 4 January 2014 Galilea made his debut as a professional, again from the bench in a 2–0 success at CD Numancia in the Segunda División championship. On 20 August he was definitely promoted to the main squad, and renewed his link until 2017 on 2 September.

After the club's promotion to La Liga, it was announced on 18 August 2016 that Galilea would return to the B-side, but still being involved with the first team. He scored his first senior goal ten days later, netting the second in a 4–0 Tercera División home routing of Santutxu FC.

On 16 January 2017, despite being injured, Galilea renewed his contract for two more seasons. Roughly one year later, he was loaned to NK Rudeš until June.

Galilea renewed his contract until 2021 on 9 June 2018, and was loaned to Ligue 2 side FC Sochaux-Montbéliard eleven days later.

=== Istra 1961 ===
In January 2019, Galilea left Sochaux and went on loan again to NK Istra 1961. On 30 August 2020, the deal was extended for a further season.

Galilea scored his first goal for the team from Pula on 21 April 2021, in a 2–1 home loss to rivals HNK Rijeka. On 19 May, he played in the 2021 Croatian Football Cup Final, lost 6–3 to GNK Dinamo Zagreb.

At the end of June 2021, Galilea's contract at Alavés expired, and he joined Istra 1961 permanently.

=== Málaga ===
On 30 June 2023, Galilea returned to his home country after signing a two-year deal with Primera Federación side Málaga CF. He was regularly used in the following years, as the club achieved two promotions in three years, and agreed to a one-year extension on 8 July 2026.

Galilea made his La Liga debut at the age of 32 on 19 August 2026, starting in a 2–0 away loss to Atlético Madrid.

== Career statistics ==
=== Club ===
As of match played 18 December 2021

Appearances and goals by club, season and competition
Club	Season	League			National Cup		League Cup		Other		Total	
Club	Season	Division	Apps	Goals	Apps	Goals	Apps	Goals	Apps	Goals	Apps	Goals
Alavés	2012–13	Segunda División B	1	0	0	0	—		—		1	0
Alavés	2013–14	Segunda División	2	0	0	0	—		—		2	0
Alavés	2014–15	Segunda División	13	0	4	0	—		—		17	0
Alavés	2015–16	Segunda División	6	0	2	0	—		—		8	0
Alavés	2016–17	Primera División	0	0	0	0	—		—		0	0
Alavés	2017–18	Primera División	0	0	0	0	—		—		0	0
Total			22	0	6	0	-	-	-	-	28	0
Rudeš (loan)	2017–18	1. HNL	14	1	0	0	—		—		14	1
Sochaux (loan)	2018–19	Ligue 2	3	0	2	0	1	0	—		6	0
Istra 1961 (loan)	2018–19	1. HNL	12	0	0	0	—		2 (Note: Appearance(s) in Relegation Playoffs)	0	14	0
Istra 1961 (loan)	2019–20	1. HNL	31	0	1	0	—		1	0	33	0
Istra 1961 (loan)	2020–21	1. HNL	25	1	2	0	—		—		27	1
Istra 1961	2021-22	1. HNL	32	2	1	0	—		—		24	1
Total			108	3	6	0	1	0	3	0	118	3
Career total			130	3	12	0	1	0	3	0	146	3

== Honours ==
Alavés

- Segunda División: 2015–16
