= Rafa Navarro (footballer, born 1994) =

Spanish association football player

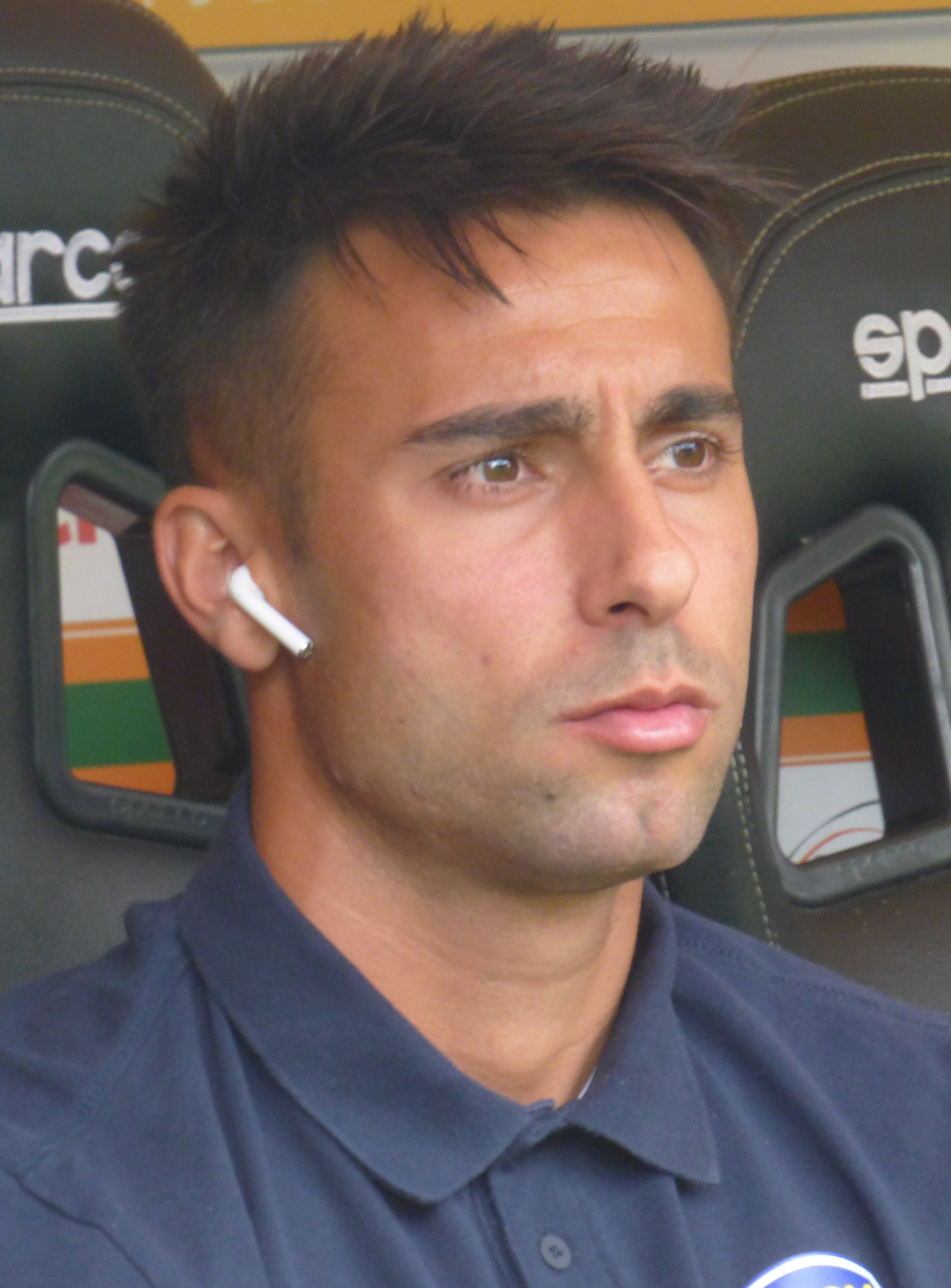
- Navarro in 2018

Personal information
- Full name: Rafael Jesús Navarro Mazuecos
- Date of birth: 24 February 1994 (age 32)
- Place of birth: Salteras, Spain
- Height: 1.73 m (5 ft 8 in)
- Position: Right-back

Team information
- Current team: Atlético Central

Youth career
- 2004–2010: Sevilla
- 2010–2012: Coria
- 2012–2013: Betis

Senior career*
Years	Team	Apps	(Gls)
2012–2013	Betis B	1	(0)
2013–2014	Gerena	32	(2)
2014–2016	Betis B	69	(2)
2016–2018	Betis	21	(2)
2018–2022	Alavés	0	(0)
2018–2019	→ Sochaux (loan)	23	(1)
2020–2022	→ Istra 1961 (loan)	30	(1)
2022–2023	SS Reyes	24	(0)
2024–2025	Ugento	22	(0)
2025–	Atlético Central	2	(0)
- * Club domestic league appearances and goals as of 8 November 2025

Rafael "Rafa" Jesús Navarro Mazuecos (born 24 February 1994) is a Spanish professional footballer who plays as a right-back for Tercera Federación club Atlético Central.

== Club career ==
Born in Salteras, Seville, Andalusia, Navarro represented Sevilla FC, Coria CF and Real Betis as a youth. He made his senior debut with the latter's B-team on 2 December 2012, starting in a 2–3 home loss against CD San Roque de Lepe in the Segunda División B.

On 2 August 2013, Navarro signed for CD Gerena of the Tercera División. He was an undisputed starter for the club during the campaign, and subsequently returned to Betis and its reserve team on 4 July 2014.

Navarro featured regularly for Betis B in the following seasons, and renewed his contract with the club until 2020 on 13 June 2016. On 24 August, he was definitely promoted to the main squad and was assigned the number 2 shirt.

Navarro made his professional – and La Liga – debut on 23 September 2016, playing the full 90 minutes in a 1–0 home win against Málaga CF. His first goal in the category came on the following 18 March, netting the last in a 2–0 home success over CA Osasuna.

On 2 July 2018, Navarro signed a three-year contract with fellow top-tier club Deportivo Alavés, being immediately loaned to Ligue 2 side FC Sochaux-Montbéliard for one year. Upon returning, he spent the entire 2019–20 campaign unregistered before joining affiliate side NK Istra 1961 on loan on 5 October 2020.

== Career statistics ==
=== Club ===
As of match played 5 March 2021

Appearances and goals by club, season and competition
Club	Season	League			National Cup		League Cup		Total	
Club	Season	Division	Apps	Goals	Apps	Goals	Apps	Goals	Apps	Goals
Betis B	2012–13	Segunda Divisíon B	1	0	—		—		1	0
Gerena	2013–14	Tercera División	32	2	—		—		32	2
Betis B	2014–15	Segunda Divisíon B	32	1	—		—		32	1
Betis B	2015–16	Segunda Divisíon B	37	1	—		—		37	1
Betis B	Total		70	2	0	0	0	0	70	2
Betis	2016–17	La Liga	18	2	0	0	—		18	2
Betis	2017–18	La Liga	3	0	2	0	—		5	0
Betis	Total		21	2	2	0	0	0	23	2
Alavés	2019–20	La Liga	0	0	0	0	—		0	0
Sochaux (loan)	2018–19	Ligue 2	23	1	2	0	1	0	26	1
Istra 1961 (loan)	2020–21	Prva HNL	9	0	1	0	—		10	0
Career total			155	7	5	0	1	0	161	7
