= Kim Hyun-woo (footballer, born 1999) =

South Korean footballer

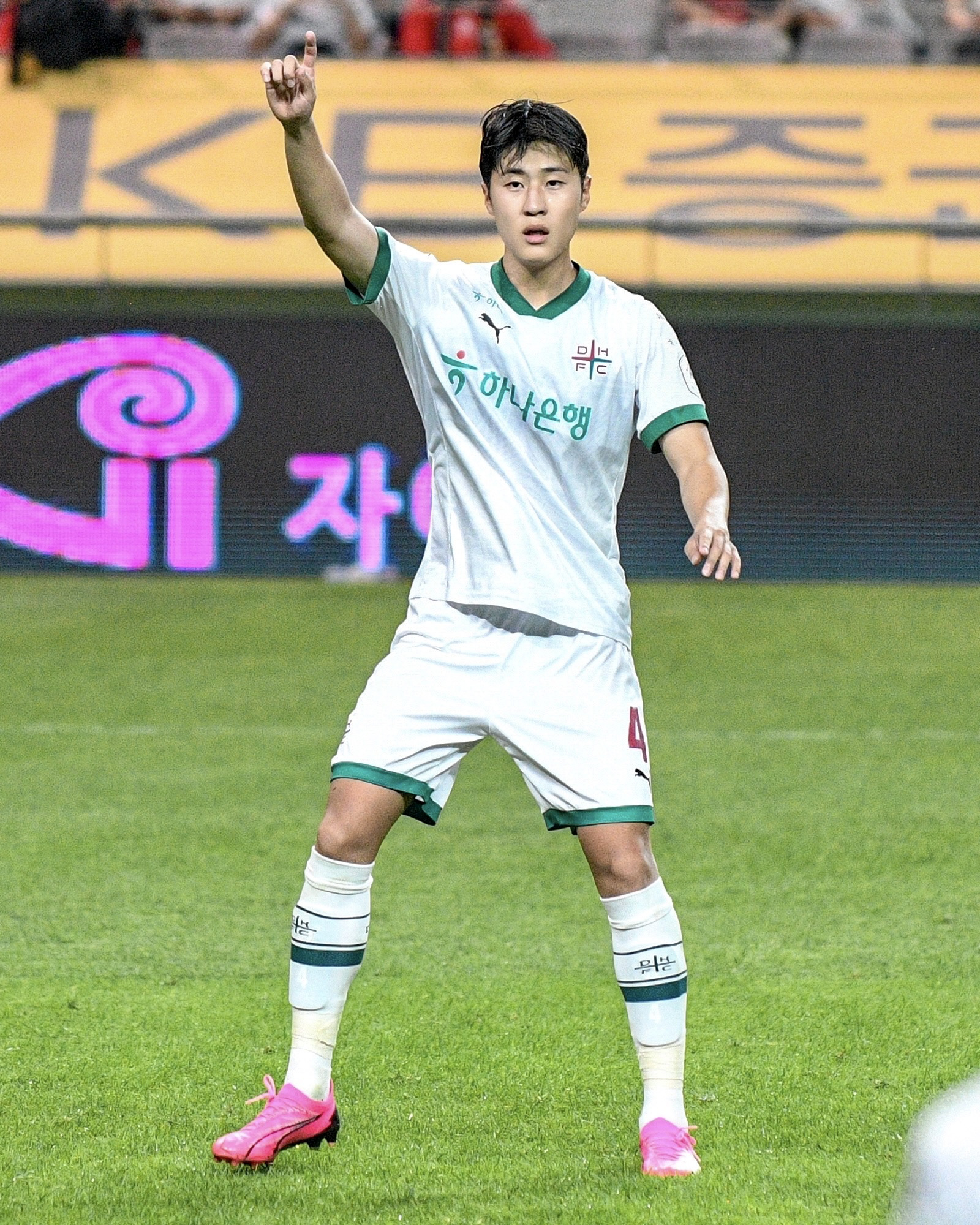
- Kim in 2024

Personal information
- Date of birth: March 7, 1999 (age 27)
- Place of birth: Busan, South Korea
- Height: 1.83 m (6 ft 0 in)
- Position: Defender

Team information
- Current team: Gimcheon Sangmu (on loan from Daejeon Hana Citizen

Youth career
- Ulsan Hyundai FC

Senior career*
Years	Team	Apps	(Gls)
2018	Ulsan Hyundai FC	0	(0)
2018–2020	→ Dinamo Zagreb II (loan)	23	(1)
2020–2023	Dinamo Zagreb II	15	(2)
2020	Dinamo Zagreb	0	(0)
2020–2021	→ Istra 1961 (loan)	5	(0)
2021	→ Slaven Belupo (loan)	9	(0)
2022	→ Ulsan Hyundai (loan)	0	(0)
2023–	Daejeon Hana Citizen II	3	(0)
2023–	Daejeon Hana Citizen	65	(1)
2025–	→ Gimcheon Sangmu (loan)	9	(0)

International career^{‡}
2016	South Korea U17	6	(1)
2017–2019	South Korea U20	22	(4)
2020–2022	South Korea U23	2	(0)
- * Club domestic league appearances and goals as of 4 August 2026 ‡ National team caps and goals as of 23:30, 12 June 2022 (UTC)

Kim Hyun-woo (Korean: 김현우; born 7 March 1999 in South Korea) is a South Korean footballer who plays as a defender for Gimcheon Sangmu on loan from Daejeon Hana Citizen in K League 1 and the South Korea U23 national team.

== Career ==
In 2018, Kim signed for GNK Dinamo Zagreb, Croatia's most successful club with fellow South Korean Kim Gyu-hyeong.

On 29 September 2020, he joined 1. HNL side NK Istra 1961 on loan.

On 12 February 2021, he joined NK Slaven Belupo until the end of the season.

Ahead of the 2022 K League 1 season, Kim joined Ulsan Hyundai on loan. His only appearance came on 24 April 2022, where he played the full 90 minutes in a 5-0 victory over Guangzhou F.C. in the 2022 AFC Champions League.

After four years in Croatia, Kim joined K League 1 side Daejeon Hana Citizen on a permanent deal on 5 January 2023.

== Career statistics ==
=== Club ===
As of 2 September 2023.

Club	Season	League			Cup		Other		Total	
Club	Season	Division	Apps	Goals	Apps	Goals	Apps	Goals	Apps	Goals
Ulsan Hyundai	2018	K League 1	0	0	0	0	0	0	0	0
Ulsan Hyundai	2019	K League 1	0	0	0	0	0	0	0	0
Ulsan Hyundai	2020	K League 1	0	0	0	0	0	0	0	0
Ulsan Hyundai	Total		0	0	0	0	0	0	0	0
Dinamo Zagreb II (loan)	2018–19	2. HNL	12	1	–		0	0	12	1
Dinamo Zagreb II (loan)	2019–20	2. HNL	11	0	–		0	0	11	0
Dinamo Zagreb II	2019–20	2. HNL	2	0	–		0	0	2	0
Dinamo Zagreb II	2020–21	2. HNL	3	1	–		0	0	3	1
Dinamo Zagreb II	2021-22	2. HNL	10	1					38	3
Dinamo Zagreb II	Total		38	3	0	0	0	0	38	3
Dinamo Zagreb	2019-20	1. HNL	0	0	0	0	0	0	0	0
Istra 1961 (loan)	2020-21	1. HNL	5	0	1	0	0	0	6	0
Slaven Belupo (loan)	2020-21	1. HNL	9	0	2	1	0	0	11	1
Ulsan Hyundai (loan)	2022	K League 1	0	0	0	0	1	0	1	0
Daejeon Hana Citizen II	2023	K League 4	3	0	–		–		3	0
Daejeon Hana Citizen	2023	K League 1	22	0	1	0	0	0	23	0
Career total			77	3	4	1	1	0	82	4
