= Josip Šutalo =

Croatian professional footballer (born 2000)

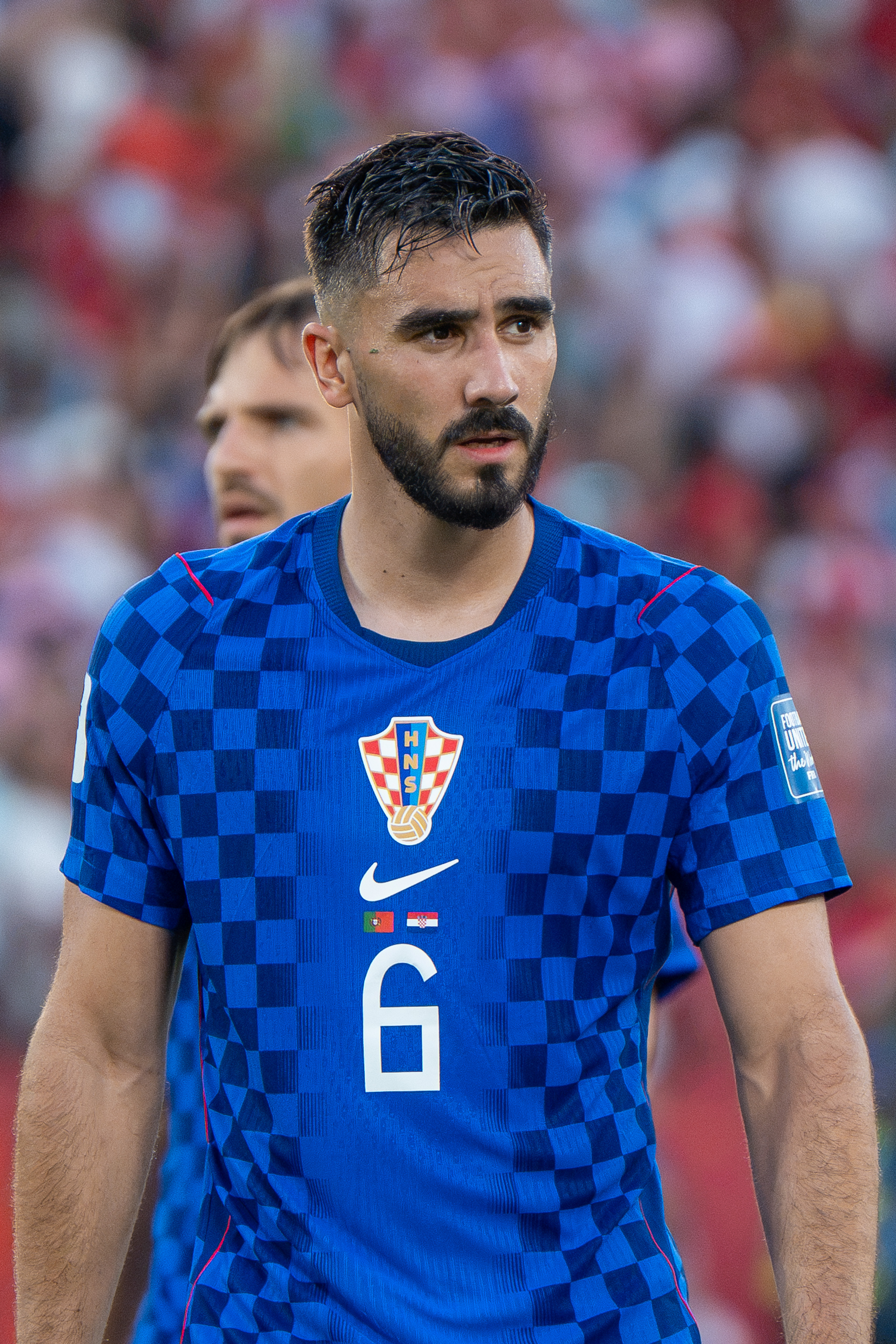
- Šutalo with Croatia in 2026

Personal information
- Full name: Josip Šutalo
- Date of birth: 28 February 2000 (age 26)
- Place of birth: Čapljina, Bosnia and Herzegovina
- Height: 1.85 m (6 ft 1 in)
- Position: Centre-back

Team information
- Current team: Lazio (on loan from Ajax)
- Number: 37

Youth career
- –2014: Neretva
- 2014–2020: Dinamo Zagreb

Senior career*
Years	Team	Apps	(Gls)
2018–2020	Dinamo Zagreb II	15	(0)
2020–2023	Dinamo Zagreb	65	(4)
2021	→ Istra 1961 (loan)	22	(0)
2023–	Ajax	76	(3)
2026–	→ Lazio (loan)	6	(0)

International career^{‡}
2015	Croatia U15	2	(0)
2015–2016	Croatia U16	15	(0)
2016	Croatia U17	10	(1)
2018	Croatia U18	2	(0)
2018–2019	Croatia U19	4	(0)
2021	Croatia U20	1	(0)
2021–2022	Croatia U21	8	(2)
2022–	Croatia	40	(0)
Medal record
Men's football
Representing Croatia
FIFA World Cup
Third place	2022 Qatar
UEFA Nations League
Runner-up	2023 Netherlands
- * Club domestic league appearances and goals as of 27 October 2026 ‡ National team caps and goals as of 7 October 2026

Josip Šutalo (born 28 February 2000) is a Croatian professional footballer who plays as a centre-back for Serie A club Lazio, on loan from Eredivisie club Ajax, and the Croatia national team.

== Early life ==
Šutalo was born in Čapljina, Bosnia and Herzegovina, and started playing youth football with NK Neretva in neighbouring Metković, Croatia. In July 2014, he joined the youth academy of Dinamo Zagreb, where he advanced through the junior squads and featured in Dinamo's UEFA Youth League runs, reaching the quarter-finals twice, as well as the final of the 2018–19 Premier League International Cup.

== Club career ==
=== Dinamo Zagreb ===
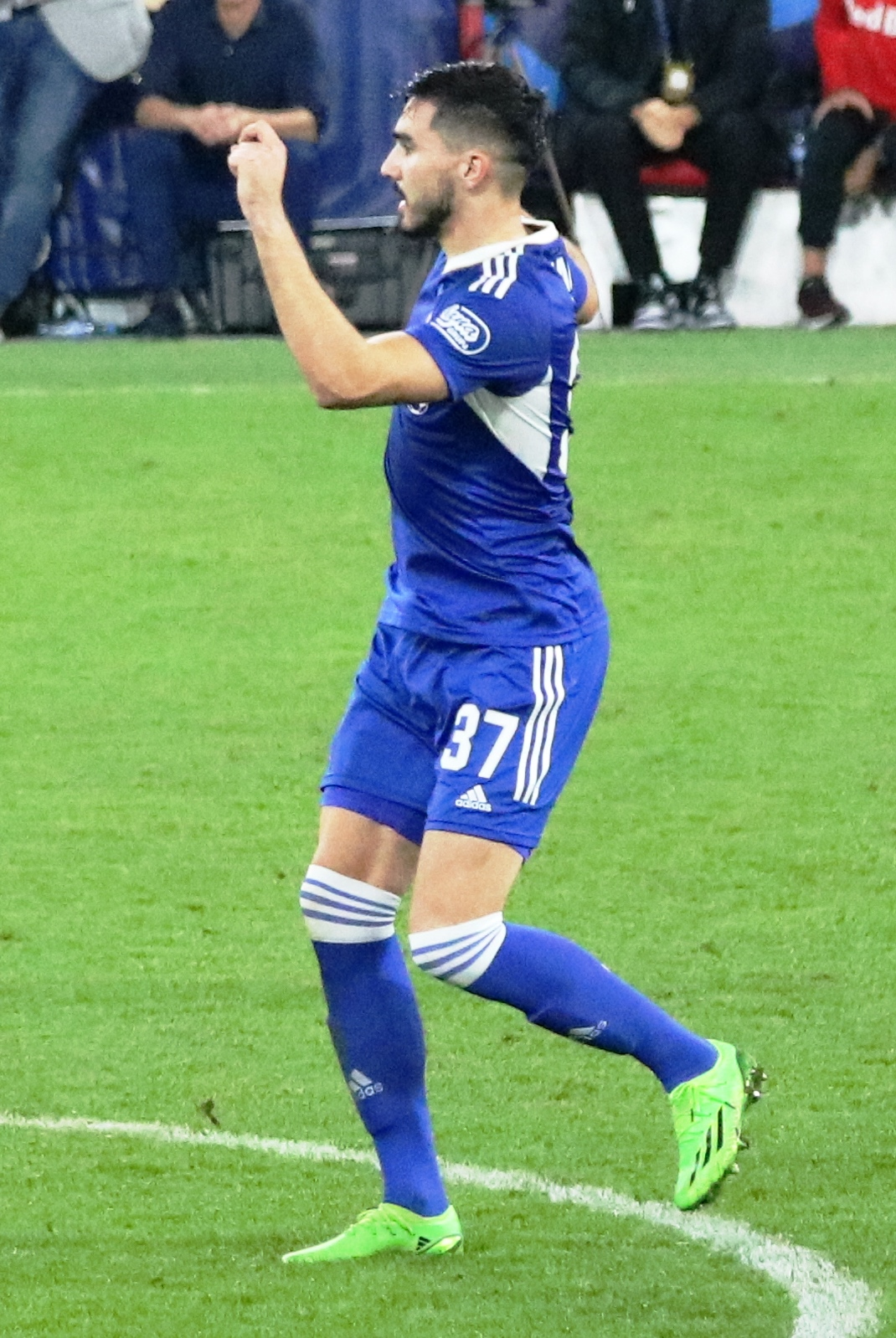
Šutalo with Dinamo Zagreb in 2022

After progressing through the academy, Šutalo made his senior debut for the reserve squad, Dinamo Zagreb II, on 1 September 2018 in a 3–1 win against Bijelo Brdo. On 30 October 2019, he debuted for the first team in a 3–0 victory over Opatija in the Croatian Cup. He made his Prva HNL debut on 1 July 2020 in a 1–0 win over Inter Zaprešić.

On 18 January 2021, Šutalo moved on a six-month loan to fellow Prva HNL club Istra 1961 for the remainder of the 2020–21 season. He made his debut the following day in a 1–1 league draw against Gorica. On 19 May 2021, he started in the Croatian Cup final, scoring an own goal as Istra were defeated 6–3 by his parent club Dinamo.

Šutalo returned to Dinamo for the 2021–22 season and established himself as a starting centre-back. On 23 July 2021, he registered his first goal and assist for Dinamo in a 4–0 league victory over Hrvatski Dragovoljac. He made his UEFA Europa League debut on 16 September 2021 in a 2–0 group stage defeat to West Ham United, scoring his first European goal on 4 November in a 3–1 home win over Rapid Wien. On 6 September 2022, he made his UEFA Champions League debut in a 1–0 group stage victory over Chelsea.

=== Ajax ===
On 21 August 2023, Šutalo signed a five-year contract with Eredivisie club Ajax for an initial transfer fee of €20.5 million. He made his debut on 3 September 2023 against Fortuna Sittard in a 0–0 draw, captaining the team on his first appearance for the club. In his debut season, he made 32 appearances across all competitions, scoring one league goal and making eight appearances across the UEFA Europa League and UEFA Europa Conference League.

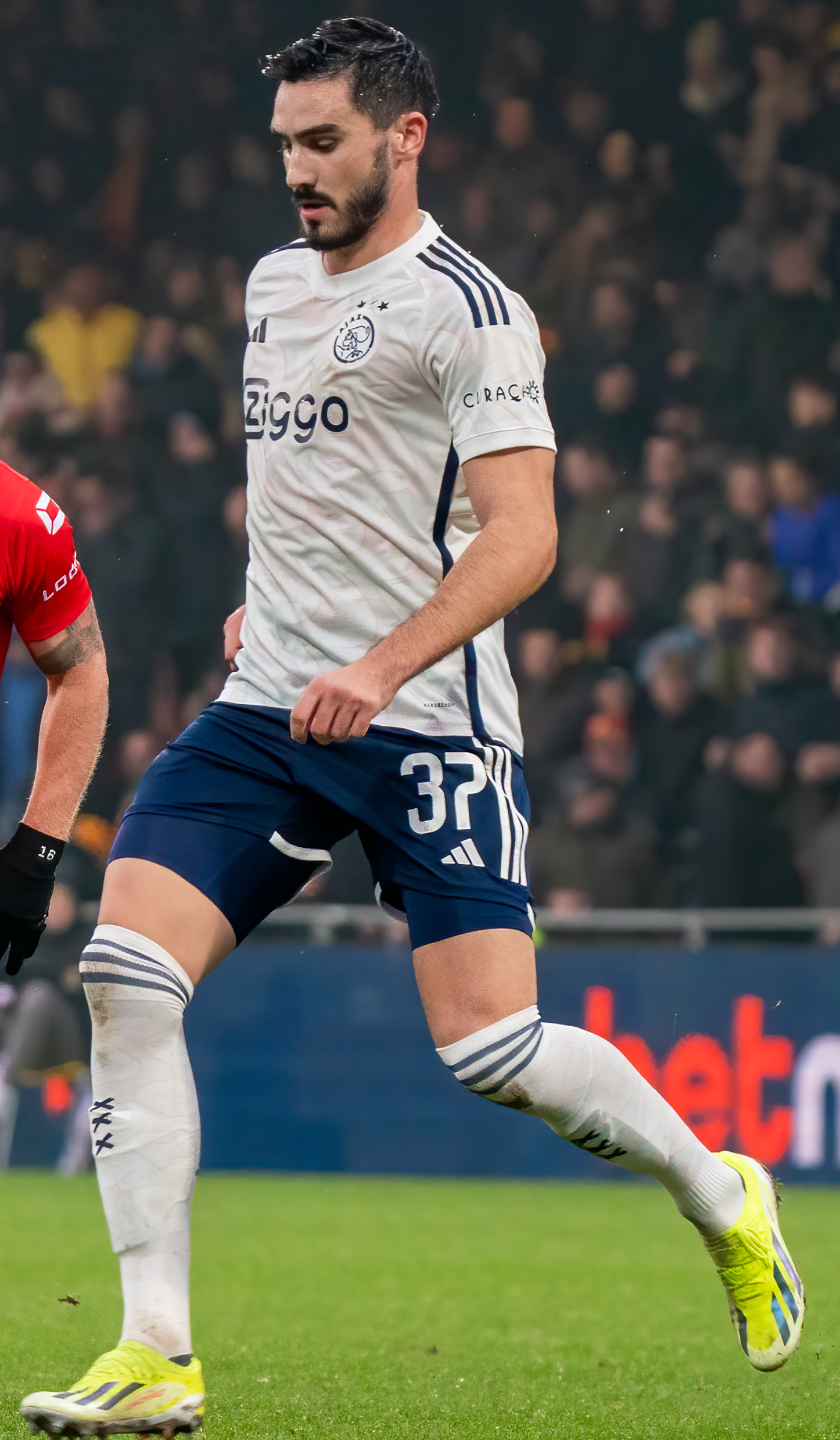
Šutalo playing for Ajax in 2024

During the 2024–25 season, Šutalo became a core component of the defensive line under new head coach Francesco Farioli, forming a regular central defensive partnership with Youri Baas. Under Farioli's structured tactical system, which provided clearer defensive instructions and emphasized collective coverage, Šutalo's form saw marked improvement compared to his debut year. He finished the campaign with 45 appearances and three goals across all competitions, and his performances earned him inclusions in the official Eredivisie Team of the Month for September 2024 and April 2025.

Šutalo continued as a starting centre-back during the 2025–26 season, recording 24 appearances in the Eredivisie and six in the UEFA Champions League, concluding his third season with Ajax on 108 total appearances and four goals.

=== Lazio ===
On 22 August 2026, Italian club Lazio announced the signing of Šutalo on a season-long loan with an option to make the transfer permanent.

== International career ==
Šutalo represented Croatia across various youth international levels, including under-15, under-16, under-17, under-18, under-19, under-20, and under-21 teams. He received his first senior call-up and debuted for the Croatia national team on 10 June 2022, starting and playing the full 90 minutes in a 1–0 away victory against Denmark in the UEFA Nations League.

In November 2022, Šutalo was named in Croatia's 26-man squad for the 2022 FIFA World Cup in Qatar. On 17 December 2022, he made his tournament debut, starting and playing the full match in a 2–1 victory against Morocco in the third place play-off to win the bronze medal.

On 5 June 2023, he was selected in Croatia's final squad for the 2023 UEFA Nations League Finals. He started and played the full match in both the 4–2 semi-final victory over the Netherlands and the final against Spain, which Croatia lost on penalties after a 0–0 draw.

Šutalo was selected in Croatia's squads for UEFA Euro 2024 and the 2026 FIFA World Cup.

== Style of play ==
Šutalo is a right-footed centre-back known for his composure in possession, distribution from the back line, and ability to break opposition lines with progressive passing. During his time at Ajax, he frequently functioned as a primary ball progressor during build-up play, utilizing ball-carrying into open spaces and precise passing under pressure. Defensively, analysts have highlighted his positioning, proactive anticipation to execute interceptions and blocks, and tactical effectiveness when operating in a structured defensive collective.

== Career statistics ==
=== Club ===
As of match played 27 October 2026

Appearances and goals by club, season and competition
Club	Season	League			National cup (Note: Includes Croatian Cup, KNVB Cup)		Europe		Other		Total	
Club	Season	Division	Apps	Goals	Apps	Goals	Apps	Goals	Apps	Goals	Apps	Goals
Dinamo Zagreb II	2018–19	Druga HNL	5	0	—		—		—		5	0
Dinamo Zagreb II	2019–20	Druga HNL	4	0	—		—		—		4	0
Dinamo Zagreb II	2020–21	Druga HNL	6	0	—		—		—		6	0
Dinamo Zagreb II	Total		15	0	0	0	0	0	0	0	15	0
Dinamo Zagreb	2019–20	Prva HNL	4	0	1	0	0	0	—		5	0
Dinamo Zagreb	2020–21	Prva HNL	3	0	1	0	0	0	—		4	0
Dinamo Zagreb	2021–22	Prva HNL	28	2	1	0	7 (Note: Appearances in UEFA Europa League)	1	—		36	3
Dinamo Zagreb	2022–23	HNL	27	2	2	1	7 (Note: Appearances in UEFA Champions League)	0	0	0	36	3
Dinamo Zagreb	2023–24	HNL	3	0	0	0	4	1	1 (Note: Appearance in Croatian Super Cup)	0	8	1
Dinamo Zagreb	Total		65	4	5	1	18	2	1	0	89	7
Istra 1961 (loan)	2020–21	Prva HNL	22	0	4	1	—		—		26	1
Ajax	2023–24	Eredivisie	23	1	1	0	8 (Note: Five appearances in UEFA Europa League, three appearances in UEFA Europa Conference League)	0	—		32	1
Ajax	2024–25	Eredivisie	29	2	0	0	16	1	—		45	3
Ajax	2025–26	Eredivisie	24	0	1	0	6	0	0	0	31	0
Ajax	Total		76	3	2	0	30	1	0	0	108	4
Lazio (loan)	2026–27	Serie A	6	0	0	0	—		0	0	6	0
Career total			184	7	11	2	48	3	1	0	244	12

=== International ===
As of match played 6 October 2026

Appearances and goals by national team and year
National team	Year	Apps	Goals
Croatia	2022	4	0
Croatia	2023	9	0
Croatia	2024	10	0
Croatia	2025	7	0
Croatia	2026	10	0
Total		40	0

== Honours ==
Dinamo Zagreb

- HNL: 2019–20, 2021–22, 2022–23
- Croatian Super Cup: 2023

Croatia

- FIFA World Cup third place: 2022
- UEFA Nations League runner-up: 2022–23

=== Individual ===
- Croatian First Football League Team of the Year: 2021–22, 2022–23
- Eredivisie Team of the Month: September 2024, April 2025
