= Matej Vuk =

Croatian footballer (born 2000)

Personal information
- Full name: Matej Vuk
- Date of birth: 10 June 2000 (age 26)
- Place of birth: Čakovec, Croatia
- Height: 1.83 m (6 ft 0 in)
- Position: Midfielder

Team information
- Current team: Varaždin
- Number: 7

Youth career
- 2007-2011: Mladost Prelog
- 2011-2012: Međimurje
- 2011-2014: Čakovec
- 2014–2018: Rijeka

Senior career*
Years	Team	Apps	(Gls)
2018–2022	Rijeka	23	(0)
2018	→ Inter Zaprešić (loan)	12	(0)
2020	→ Sereď (loan)	9	(4)
2020–2021	→ Istra 1961 (loan)	26	(6)
2023–2024	Istra 1961	51	(5)
2025–	Varaždin	43	(5)

International career^{‡}
2015	Croatia U15	2	(0)
2015–16	Croatia U16	7	(1)
2016	Croatia U17	3	(1)
2017	Croatia U18	2	(0)
2018	Croatia U19	4	(0)
2019	Croatia U20	2	(0)
2020	Croatia U21	1	(0)
- * Club domestic league appearances and goals as of 15 June 2026 ‡ National team caps and goals as of 8 December 2022

Matej Vuk (born 10 June 2000) is a Croatian professional footballer who plays as a midfielder for Croatian First Football League club Varaždin and the Croatia national under-21 team.

== Club career ==
Born in Čakovec, Međimurje County, growing up in Čehovec near Prelog, Vuk started training for and playing football at the local NK Mladost Prelog at the age of 7. Following stints at NK Međimurje and NK Čakovec, Vuk joined the HNK Rijeka academy at the age of 14, where he went through all remaining ranks. However, he made his first senior appearances on loan at Inter Zaprešić in 2018. He played his first professional match on 28 July 2018, on the opening day of the 2018–19 season against Lokomotiva. He was in the starting lineup as Zaprešić lost by a score of 0–4 away at Stadion Kranjčevićeva.

In September 2020, Vuk was sent on a one-season loan to Istra. He immediately scored in his first appearance for Istra, opening the score against HNK Gorica on 19 September 2020, as the match ended 2–2. He finished the season as the top goalscorer for the club, scoring six goals in 30 total appearances, before returning to Rijeka.

In December 2022 Vuk rejoined NK Istra 1961, signing a contract until 2025.

== International career ==
Having played for numerous national youth teams, Vuk made his debut for the Croatia under-21 team against Lithuania on 17 November 2020. He was in the starting lineup before being replaced by Luka Ivanušec at half-time in a 7–0 win. He was selected to compete in the 2021 UEFA European Under-21 Championship, where he initially replaced an injured Luka Sučić, but had to withdraw from the tournament himself due to an injury.

== Career statistics ==
As of match played 16 December 2023

Appearances and goals by club, season and competition
Club	Season	League			National cup		Europe		Other		Total	
Club	Season	Division	Apps	Goals	Apps	Goals	Apps	Goals	Apps	Goals	Apps	Goals
Rijeka	2018–19	1. HNL	2	0	0	0	—		—		2	0
Rijeka	2019–20	1. HNL	2	0	1	1	1	0	—		4	1
Rijeka	2020–21	1. HNL	0	0	0	0	—		—		0	0
Rijeka	2021–22	1. HNL	18	0	2	1	1 (Note: Appearance(s) in the UEFA Europa Conference League)	0	0	0	21	1
Rijeka	2022–23	1. HNL	1	0	0	0	—		—		1	0
Rijeka	Total		23	0	3	2	2	0	0	0	28	2
Inter Zaprešić (loan)	2018–19	1. HNL	12	0	2	0	—		—		14	0
iClinic Sereď (loan)	2019–20	Fortuna Liga	9	4	0	0	—		—		9	4
Istra (loan)	2020–21	1. HNL	26	6	4	0	—		—		30	6
Istra	2022–23	1. HNL	15	0	0	0	—		—		15	0
Istra	2023–24	1. HNL	14	3	2	0	—		—		16	3
Istra	Total		29	3	2	0	—		—		31	3
Career total			99	13	11	2	2	0	0	0	112	15

== Honours ==
Rijeka

- Croatian Cup: 2018–19, 2019–20
