= Sergi González =

Spanish footballer

Sergi Gonzalez
Personal information
- Full name: Sergio González Testón
- Date of birth: 26 May 1995 (age 31)
- Place of birth: Madrid, Spain
- Height: 1.81 m (5 ft 11 in)
- Position: Left back

Team information
- Current team: Racing Madrid

Youth career
- Atlético Madrid

Senior career*
| Years | Team | Apps | (Gls) |
| 2014–2016 | Atlético Madrid C | 34 | (3) |
| 2015–2016 | → Rayo Majadahonda (loan) | 26 | (1) |
| 2016–2018 | Atlético Madrid B | 31 | (1) |
| 2017–2018 | Atlético Madrid | 0 | (0) |
| 2018–2019 | Ararat-Armenia | 23 | (0) |
| 2019–2021 | Alavés | 0 | (0) |
| 2019–2021 | → Istra 1961 (loan) | 30 | (0) |
| 2022–2025 | SS Reyes | 37 | (2) |
| 2025 | Bergantiños | 3 | (0) |
| 2025– | Racing Madrid | 2 | (0) |
- * Club domestic league appearances and goals as of 28 September 2025

Sergio González Testón (born 26 May 1995), commonly known as Sergi, is a Spanish footballer who plays for Tercera Federación club Racing Madrid as a left back.

== Club career ==
Born in Madrid, Sergi was an Atlético Madrid youth graduate. He made his senior debut with the C-team on 7 September 2014, starting in a 5–1 Tercera División home routing of AD Colmenar Viejo.

Sergi scored his first senior goal on 26 October 2014, netting the first in a 2–1 away win against CD San Fernando de Henares. The following 19 July, he was loaned to Segunda División B side CF Rayo Majadahonda, for one year.

After featuring regularly for the club, Sergi returned to Atleti in July 2016 and was assigned to the reserves in the fourth division. He made his first team debut on 25 October 2017, starting in a 1–1 away draw against Elche CF, for the season's Copa del Rey. On 22 February 2018, he made his European debut, playing 90 minutes in a 1–0 win against F.C. Copenhagen in the second leg of the round of 32 of the Europa League.

On 24 August 2018, Sergi signed for FC Ararat-Armenia, leaving on 20 June 2019 when his contract expired.

Sergi then returned to Spain with Deportivo Alavés, who loaned him to NK Istra 1961, their partner club in the Croatian Football League. After two years with the Pula-based club – including playing in their 6–3 defeat to GNK Dinamo Zagreb in the 2021 cup final – he joined UD San Sebastián de los Reyes in the Primera División RFEF in January 2022.
