= Ivančić =

Ivančić is a Croatian surname, and stems from the male given name Ivan. Notable people with the surname include:

- Antonio Ivančić (born 1995), Croatian footballer
- Ivan Ivančić (1937–2014), Bosnian-Croatian athletics coach and shot putter
- Josip Ivančić (born 1991), Croatian professional footballer
- Kruno Ivančić (born 1994), Croatian football winger
- Mirko Ivančić (born 1960), Croatian rower
- Mladen Ivančić (footballer) (born 1970), Croatian former football defender and manager
- Mladen Ivančić (film promoter) (born 1955), New Zealand film official of Croatian descent
- Nina Ivančić (born 1953), Croatian artist
- Tomislav Ivančić (1938–2017), Croatian theologian and academic
- Viktor Ivančić (born 1960), Croatian journalist
- Zoran Ivančić (born 1975), Croatian retired football defender
