= Gedeon Guzina =

Bosnian footballer

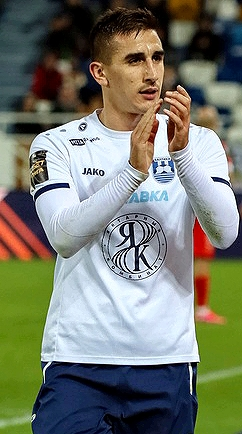
- Guzin as part of Baltika in 2022

Personal information
- Date of birth: 26 December 1993 (age 32)
- Place of birth: Ilidža, Bosnia and Herzegovina
- Height: 1.87 m (6 ft 2 in)
- Position: Centre-forward

Team information
- Current team: Orenburg
- Number: 30

Senior career*
Years	Team	Apps	(Gls)
–2014	Drina HE Višegrad	0	(0)
2014–2016	Sutjeska Foča	1	(0)
2016	Tekstilac Derventa	12	(5)
2016–2017	Borac Banja Luka	27	(4)
2017–2018	Zvijezda Gradačac	25	(8)
2018–2019	Mladost Doboj Kakanj	30	(7)
2019–2020	Sarajevo	10	(0)
2020–2021	Istra 1961	40	(4)
2021–2022	Radomlje	27	(9)
2022–2024	Baltika Kaliningrad	51	(16)
2024–2025	Radomlje	3	(0)
2025	Chernomorets Novorossiysk	13	(7)
2025–	Orenburg	42	(4)
- * Club domestic league appearances and goals as of 21 November 2026

Gedeon Guzina (born 26 December 1993) is a Bosnian professional footballer who plays as a centre-forward for Russian club Orenburg.

Guzina started his professional career at Višegrad.

== Early life ==
He was born on 26 December 1993 on Ilidža during Bosnian War.

== Club career ==
=== Mladost Doboj Kakanj ===
In June 2018 he signed for Mladost Doboj Kakanj. He played an excellent season, making thirty appearances with seven goals.

=== Sarajevo ===
After a year in Doboj Kakanj, he signed for Sarajevo. He signed a contract for two years. He left the club after half a season.

=== Istra 1961 ===
In February 2020 he signed for Croatian club Istra 1961. In the Croatian club, he showed his qualities and became irreplaceable in the first team. After more than a year and a half and great performances for Istra, he left the club for free due to the expiration of his contract.

=== Radomlje ===
Not long after the contract with the club from Croatia expired, he settled down in Slovenia, signing for Radomlje. He did not stay long in Slovenia because he left the club after a great season.

=== Baltika Kaliningrad ===
In July 2022 he signed for Russian club Baltika from Kaliningrad. He coped perfectly in Russia, he was the club's and the league's top scorer.

On 4 June 2024, Guzina left Baltika as his contract expired.

=== NK Radomlje ===
He goes back to Radomlje as a free agent.

== Career statistics ==
=== Club ===
As of match played 21 November 2026

Appearances and goals by club, season and competition
Club	Season	League			National cup (Note: Includes Bosnian Cup, Croatian Cup, Slovenian Cup, Russian Cup)		Continental		Total	
Club	Season	Division	Apps	Goals	Apps	Goals	Apps	Goals	Apps	Goals
Borac Banja Luka	2016–17	First League of RS	27	4	1	0	–		28	4
Zvijezda Gradačac	2017–18	First League of FBiH	25	8	0	0	–		25	8
Mladost Doboj Kakanj	2018–19	Bosnian Premier League	30	7	0	0	–		30	7
Sarajevo	2019–20	Bosnian Premier League	10	0	1	1	2 (Note: One appearance in UEFA Champions League, one appearance in UEFA Europa League)	0	13	1
Istra 1961	2019–20	Prva HNL	16	3	0	0	–		16	3
Istra 1961	2020–21	Prva HNL	26	1	3	2	–		29	3
Istra 1961	Total		42	4	3	2	–		45	6
Radomlje	2021–22	Slovenian PrvaLiga	27	9	1	0	–		28	9
Baltika Kaliningrad	2022–23	Russian First League	33	14	0	0	–		33	14
Baltika Kaliningrad	2023–24	Russian Premier League	18	2	6	1	–		24	3
Baltika Kaliningrad	Total		51	16	6	1	–		57	17
Radomlje	2024–25	Slovenian PrvaLiga	3	0	0	0	–		3	0
Chernomorets Novorossiysk	2024–25	Russian First League	13	7	0	0	–		13	7
Orenburg	2025–26	Russian Premier League	27	2	6	0	–		33	2
Orenburg	2026–27	Russian Premier League	15	2	4	0	–		19	2
Orenburg	Total		42	4	10	0	–		52	4
Career total			270	59	22	4	2	0	294	63

== Honours ==
Sarajevo

- Bosnian Premier League: 2019–20
