= Kim Gyu-hyeong =

South Korean footballer

Personal information
- Date of birth: 29 March 1999 (age 27)
- Place of birth: Gyeongju, South Korea
- Height: 1.68 m (5 ft 6 in)
- Position: Midfielder

Team information
- Current team: Pohang Steelers
- Number: 22

Youth career
- 2008–2011: Ipsil Elementary School
- 2012–2014: Hyundai Middle School (Youth)
- 2015–2017: Hyundai High School (Youth)
- 2018: → Dinamo Zagreb (youth loan)

Senior career*
Years	Team	Apps	(Gls)
2018–2020	Ulsan Hyundai	0	(0)
2018–2020	→ Dinamo Zagreb II (loan)	25	(3)
2020–	Dinamo Zagreb II	3	(1)
2020–	Dinamo Zagreb	0	(0)
2020–2021	→ Istra 1961 (loan)	4	(0)
2021	→ Slaven Belupo (loan)	1	(0)
2021	→ NK Kustošija (loan)	6	(1)
2022	→ Jeju United (loan)	6	(0)
2023	Suwon FC	5	(0)
2024–	Pohang Steelers	1	(0)

International career^{‡}
2014–2016	South Korea U17	11	(6)
2018	South Korea U20	3	(0)
- * Club domestic league appearances and goals as of 26 February 2022 ‡ National team caps and goals as of 13 March 2021

- Kim Gyu-hyeong
- Hangul: 김규형
- RR: Gim Gyuhyeong
- MR: Kim Kyuhyŏng

Kim Gyu-hyeong (Korean: 김규형; born 29 March 1999) is a South Korean footballer currently playing as a midfielder for Pohang Steelers.

== Career statistics ==
=== Club ===
As of 13 March 2021.

Club	Season	League			Cup		Other		Total	
Club	Season	Division	Apps	Goals	Apps	Goals	Apps	Goals	Apps	Goals
Ulsan Hyundai	2018	K League 1	0	0	0	0	0	0	0	0
Ulsan Hyundai	2019	K League 1	0	0	0	0	0	0	0	0
Ulsan Hyundai	2020	K League 1	0	0	0	0	0	0	0	0
Ulsan Hyundai	Total		0	0	0	0	0	0	0	0
Dinamo Zagreb II (loan)	2018–19	2. HNL	9	2	–		0	0	9	2
Dinamo Zagreb II (loan)	2019–20	2. HNL	16	1	–		0	0	16	1
Dinamo Zagreb II	2019–20	2. HNL	3	1	–		0	0	3	1
Dinamo Zagreb II	Total		28	4	0	0	0	0	28	4
Dinamo Zagreb	2020–21	1. HNL	0	0	0	0	0	0	0	0
Istra 1961 (loan)	2020–21	1. HNL	4	0	1 (Note: Appearances in the Croatian Cup)	0	0	0	5	0
Slaven Belupo (loan)	2020–21	1. HNL	1	0	0	0	0	0	1	0
Career total			33	4	1	0	0	0	34	4
