= Danijel Jumić =

Croatian footballer (born 1986)

Personal information
- Date of birth: 27 June 1986 (age 40)
- Place of birth: Osijek, SR Croatia, SFR Yugoslavia
- Height: 1.88 m (6 ft 2 in)
- Position: Striker

Senior career*
Years	Team	Apps	(Gls)
2004–2005	Koper	18	(5)
2005–2008	Kärnten II	32	(9)
2005–2008	Kärnten	14	(3)
2007	→ Spittal (loan)	18	(7)
2008–2009	Jadran Poreč		
2009	Dunajská Streda	9	(2)
2010	Novigrad	2	(0)
2010–2011	Vllaznia	2	(0)

International career
2004	Croatia U18	3	(0)
2004	Croatia U19	7	(2)

Managerial career
- 2013–2017: Jadran Poreč (youth)
- 2017–2019: Jadran Poreč
- 2020: Istra 1961 (interim)
- 2021: Istra 1961
- 2021–2023: Osijek (youth)
- 2023: Trabzonspor (assistant)
- 2023–2024: Union Berlin (assistant)
- 2024–: Dinamo Zagreb (assistant)
- * Club domestic league appearances and goals

Danijel Jumić (born 27 June 1986) is a Croatian football coach and former player who most recently the manager of Prva HNL club Istra 1961.

He played for Vllaznia Shkodër in the Albanian Superliga in 2010.

He was appointed Academy manager at NK Osijek in June 2021 after leaving NK Istra 1961.

== Managerial statistics ==
As of match played 21 May 2021

Managerial record by team and tenure
Team	From	To	Record				
Team	From	To	G	W	D	L	Win %
Istra 1961	19 August 2017	27 August 2017	2	0	0	2	0.00
Istra 1961	11 February 2021	11 June 2021	21	7	4	10	33.33
Total			23	7	4	12	30.43
