= Šime Gržan =

Croatian footballer

Personal information
- Date of birth: 6 April 1994 (age 32)
- Place of birth: Zadar, Croatia
- Height: 1.72 m (5 ft 7 1/2 in)
- Position: Right winger

Team information
- Current team: Al-Anwar
- Number: 43

Youth career
- 2003–2012: Zadar

Senior career*
Years	Team	Apps	(Gls)
2011–2013	Zadar	49	(1)
2014–2015	Lokomotiva	28	(3)
2016–2017	Istra 1961	46	(7)
2018–2019	Zrinjski Mostar	9	(0)
2019	GOŠK Gabela	12	(1)
2019–2021	Istra 1961	66	(9)
2021–2024	Osijek	68	(1)
2022	→ Zalaegerszeg (loan)	7	(0)
2024–2025	Šibenik	27	(3)
2025–2026	Macarthur FC	17	(0)
2026–	Al-Anwar	0	(0)

International career^{‡}
2012	Croatia U18	6	(0)
2011–2013	Croatia U19	9	(0)
- * Club domestic league appearances and goals as of 28 August 2026 ‡ National team caps and goals as of 10 July 2016

Šime Gržan (Croatian: [ˈʃime ˈɡrʒan]; born 6 April 1994) is a Croatian professional footballer who plays for Al-Anwar in the Saudi First Division League.

== Club career ==
Gržan went through all the ranks of his hometown club NK Zadar's academy, debuting for the first team shortly after his 17th birthday, on 14 May 2011, coming in the 82nd minute of the home 0–0 draw against GNK Dinamo Zagreb for Luka Begonja. He continued featuring for the first team until the end of 2013. He scored his only goal for Zadar in March 2013, the game winner against NK Lokomotiva, to Begonja's assist.

In the 2013–14 winter transfer period Gržan and teammate Begonja moved together to Lokomotiva. Two years later, Gržan moved on to NK Istra 1961.

After almost of two years playing at Istra, Gržan left the club and signed for Premier League of Bosnia and Herzegovina club HŠK Zrinjski Mostar on 29 December 2017. He won the league title with Zrinjski in the 2017–18 season. He left Zrinjski on 1 February 2019.

The same day that Gržan left Zrinjski, he signed for NK GOŠK Gabela. He made his first appearance for GOŠK on 23 February 2019, in a 1–0 away loss against FK Mladost Doboj Kakanj. He scored his first goal for GOŠK on 24 April 2019, in a 1–2 home loss against FK Radnik Bijeljina. In May 2019, after the end of the season and after the relegation of GOŠK to the First League of FBiH, Gržan decided to leave the club.

On 25 January 2022, Gržan joined Zalaegerszeg in Hungary on loan until the end of the season.

== International career ==
Gržan represented Croatia on various youth levels.

He was part of the Croatia U18 and Croatia U19 teams, featuring in 9 and 6 games respectively for them.

Gržan was also a part of the Croatia U21 team, but didn't feature in any game for them.

== Honours ==
=== Club ===
Zrinjski Mostar

- Bosnian Premier League: 2017–18
