= Josip Tomašević (footballer, born 1993) =

Croatian footballer

Personal information
- Date of birth: 26 September 1993 (age 33)
- Place of birth: Virovitica, Croatia
- Position: Defender

Team information
- Current team: BSK Bijelo Brdo
- Number: 6

Senior career*
Years	Team	Apps	(Gls)
2010–2013	Osijek	1	(0)
2012	→ Graničar (loan)	11	(2)
2013–2015	Novigrad	57	(9)
2015–2017	Cibalia	54	(1)
2017–2019	Rudar Velenje	57	(1)
2019–2021	Istra 1961	51	(0)
2021–2022	Cibalia	8	(1)
2022	Prishtina	10	(0)
2022-	BSK Bijelo Brdo	19	(0)

International career
2008	Croatia U15	3	(0)
2009	Croatia U16	9	(1)
2009–2010	Croatia U17	11	(0)
2010–2012	Croatia U19	10	(1)
- * Club domestic league appearances and goals as of 19 June 2023

Josip Tomašević (born 26 September 1993) is a Croatian footballer who plays for BSK Bijelo Brdo as a defender.
