= NK Ivančica =

Croatian football club

Ivančica
- Full name: Nogometni Klub Ivančica Ivanec
- Founded: 1934; 91 years ago
- Dissolved: 2013; 12 years ago
- Ground: Gradski stadion Ivanec
- Capacity: 1,500

Nogometni Klub Ivančica Ivanec (English: Ivančica Ivanec Football Club), commonly referred to as NK Ivančica or simply Ivančica, was a Croatian football club based in the town of Ivanec.
