= Dino Halilović =

Croatian footballer

Personal information
- Date of birth: 8 February 1998 (age 28)
- Place of birth: Zagreb, Croatia
- Height: 1.81 m (5 ft 11 in)
- Position: Midfielder

Team information
- Current team: Al-Tai
- Number: 6

Youth career
- 2010–2016: Dinamo Zagreb
- 2016–2017: Udinese

Senior career*
Years	Team	Apps	(Gls)
2017–2018	Istra 1961	24	(0)
2018–2020	Lokomotiva	31	(3)
2019	→ Rudeš (loan)	16	(0)
2020–2021	Istra 1961	17	(0)
2021–2022	Esbjerg fB	7	(0)
2022–2023	FC Den Bosch	24	(1)
2023	Tabor Sežana	12	(2)
2023–2025	Velež Mostar	54	(6)
2025–	Al-Tai	0	(0)

International career
2013	Croatia U16	1	(0)
2015	Croatia U17	4	(0)
2015	Croatia U18	4	(1)
2016	Croatia U19	4	(1)
2018–2019	Croatia U20	6	(0)
- * Club domestic league appearances and goals as of 1 June 2025

Dino Halilović (born 8 February 1998) is a Croatian footballer who plays as a midfielder for Saudi club Al-Tai.

== Club career ==
Born in Zagreb, Halilović started his youth career with the academy of Dinamo Zagreb at the age of 12. Although in March 2014, reports emerged of him joining FC Barcelona B, In early 2016, he joined the academy of Italian club Udinese Calcio. In spite of him linked with Spanish club UD Las Palmas and German club Hamburger SV, he moved to Croatian club Istra 1961 on a two-year contract on 28 June 2017.

On 19 June 2018, Halilović moved to fellow league club Lokomotiva. On 25 January 2019, Halilović was loaned out to NK Rudeš for the rest of the season.

On 16 August 2021, Halilović joined Danish 1st Division club Esbjerg fB on a deal until June 2023. However, on 10 January 2022 Esbjerg confirmed, that they had terminated the contract of Halilović by mutual agreement.

On 12 January 2022, Halilović signed with FC Den Bosch in the Netherlands until the summer of 2023.

On 10 September 2025, Halilović joined Saudi FDL club Al-Tai.

== International career ==
Halilović represented the Croatian under-17 team at the 2015 UEFA European Under-17 Championship, where his team reached the quarter-finals. Although he was named in the squad for the 2015 under-17 World Cup, he failed to feature in the competition.

== Personal life ==
His father, Sejad Halilović, is a Bosniak, and his mother, Vanessa, is a Croat. His father is a former Croatian and Bosnian international. Dino has two brothers, Damir and Alen, the latter being a Croatian international who also played for FC Barcelona.

== Career statistics ==
=== Club ===
As of 28 November 2021

Appearances and goals by club, season and competition
Club	Season	League			National cup		Other		Total	
Club	Season	Division	Apps	Goals	Apps	Goals	Apps	Goals	Apps	Goals
Istra 1961	2017–18	Prva HNL	24	0	3	2	2 (Note: Appearances in relegation play-offs)	0	29	2
Lokomotiva	2018–19	Prva HNL	8	1	3	0	0	0	11	1
Lokomotiva	2019–20	Prva HNL	21	1	3	1	0	0	24	2
Lokomotiva	2020–21	Prva HNL	2	1	0	0	1 (Note: Appearances in UEFA Champions League)	0	3	1
Lokomotiva	Total		31	3	6	1	1	0	38	4
Rudeš (loan)	2018–19	Prva HNL	16	0	0	0	0	0	16	0
Istra 1961	2020–21	Prva HNL	17	0	4	0	0	0	21	0
Esbjerg fB	2021–22	1st Division	7	0	1	0	0	0	8	0
Career total			95	3	14	3	3	0	112	6
