= Petar Mamić =

Croatian footballer (born 1996)

Personal information
- Date of birth: 6 March 1996 (age 30)
- Place of birth: Zagreb, Croatia
- Height: 1.83 m (6 ft 0 in)
- Position: Left-back

Team information
- Current team: Zrinjski Mostar
- Number: 12

Youth career
- 2004–2014: Dinamo Zagreb

Senior career*
Years	Team	Apps	(Gls)
2014–2017	Dinamo Zagreb II	51	(6)
2014–2017	Dinamo Zagreb	1	(0)
2015	→ Lokomotiva (loan)	9	(0)
2017	Frosinone	0	(0)
2017–2018	Inter Zaprešić	24	(1)
2018–2020	Rijeka	19	(0)
2020	→ Varaždin (loan)	13	(1)
2020–2021	Raków Częstochowa	0	(0)
2021	Podbeskidzie	12	(0)
2021–2022	Hrvatski Dragovoljac	11	(0)
2022–2024	Žalgiris	52	(4)
2024	CFR Cluj	3	(0)
2024–	Zrinjski Mostar	49	(2)

International career
2010	Croatia U14	2	(0)
2010–2011	Croatia U15	6	(0)
2012	Croatia U16	8	(0)
2012–2013	Croatia U17	21	(6)
2013–2014	Croatia U18	3	(0)
2013–2015	Croatia U19	7	(0)
2017–2019	Croatia U21	5	(0)
- * Club domestic league appearances and goals as of 12 September 2026

Petar Mamić (pronounced [pětär mä̌:mit͡ɕ]; born 6 March 1996) is a Croatian professional footballer who plays as a left-back for Bosnian Premier League club Zrinjski Mostar.

== Club career ==
=== Early career ===
==== Dinamo Zagreb ====
Petar started off by playing in Dinamo's Hitrec-Kacian football academy. With Dinamo's pioneers he won three titles from 2008 to 2009 to 2010–11 and with the cadets he won one title in 2012–13. Besides these titles he won the 2014 Mladen Ramljak Tournament with the cadets scoring a total of five goals, won the silver medal with the cadets on the 2014 Zayed International Football Cup and, with the juniors, won the 2014 Tournament of Turopolje. He went with Luka Capan on football trials with the seniors and made his debut for the seniors, donning the number 15, in a 3–1 win against NK Istra 1961 on 6 February 2014 playing the first half. However, Mamić and Capan were put on the B squad after the 2014 summer transfer window to serve as backup for the seniors.

=== 2014–15 season ===
==== Dinamo Zagreb 2 ====
Mamić debuted for the B team, this time wearing the number 26, in a friendly 4–0 win over NK Hrvatski Dragovoljac on 20 July 2014. Mamić proceeded to play seven more friendlies earning a red card in the sixth game before suffering a concussion in the seventh game after a strong blow to the head only minutes after having scored his first goal for the B team against NK Jedinstvo Sveti Križ Začretje. Following his injury, he was replaced by Nicolas Taravel but resumed training after only a week making a comeback, and also debut in the league, five days later, on 9 September, in a 5–2 win over NK Moslavina. Mamić, after having played one more league game, was called in for the U-19 national team to participate in the 2015 UEFA European Under-19 Championship qualification and missed out on three league games before returning, on 14 October, in a friendly against NK Libertas Novska. Mamić returned to the league on 18 October, playing full-time and earning a yellow card in a tie with NK Vrbovec. Mamić played five more games in the fall season, earning two more yellow cards and scoring his first ever league goal from a penalty, on 29 November, in a 3–1 win over NK Rijeka II.

Mamić was speculated to be kept in the B team so as to maintain Dinamo B's domination in the league in hopes of moving up to Druga HNL, especially after Mario Musa was called back to Dinamo's seniors. However, on 8 January 2015, Lokomotiva announced that Mamić had been loaned out to them for the rest of the season, along with Franko Andrijašević and Dino Perić.

==== Lokomotiva ====
Mamić debuted for NK Lokomotiva on 18 January 2015, wearing the number 3, in a friendly 3–0 win over NK Vrapče. Mamić went to Rovinj on trials with the team and played all of the matches of the Arena Kup. Mamić debuted for the team in the league on 7 February in a 1–2 loss against GNK Dinamo Zagreb. Three weeks later he was a last-minute substitute and was substituted in on two more games before being given another chance to play in the starting roster again in a 1–2 loss against Dinamo. Mamić was once more a substitute and finally got to play three full games in a row at the end of the season, even earning two yellow cards. Mamić also played both quarter-final games against NK Rijeka in the 2014–15 Croatian Football Cup and earned a yellow card in the first game.

Lokomotiva had qualified for the 2015–16 UEFA Europa League so Mamić went with the team on trials in Slovenia and debuted in the Europa League on 9 July 2015 in the second leg of the First round in a 2–2 draw against Welsh side Airbus UK Broughton F.C. He remained on the bench in the Second round against P.A.O.K. with Lokomotiva eventually being expelled with a 3–7 aggregate score. Mamić was benched for the first three games of the 2015-16 season before being transferred back to Dinamo Zagreb 2 to enable Dinamo to loan out Borna Barišić to Lokomotiva seeing as they had already loaned out six players to them. (Note: Six was the maximum number of players that could be loaned out from one club to another in the same league level as per the decision of the 2015 HNS Assembly, article 52, paragraph 2.)

=== 2015–16 season ===
==== Return to Dinamo Zagreb 2 ====
Having left NK Lokomotiva, Mamić returned in the second round of the 2015–16 Croatian Second Football League on 22 August 2015 in a 2–0 loss against HNK Šibenik. He played four more games before scoring an own goal in a 0–2 loss against NK Rudeš as well as earning a yellow card in the next match. He did, however, make up for it after another game by scoring his first goal of the season, as well as the equalizer, after having received a yellow card, in a 2–1 turnover victory over HNK Šibenik. He played two further games, receiving a yellow card in the second one before playing a game for the first team in the second round of the 2015-16 Croatian Football Cup against NK Mladost Ždralovi in which he also received a yellow card. He then missed out on the next match due to accumulated yellow cards and returned on 13 November against HNK Gorica but remained on the bench. Mamić finished the first half of the season playing full-time in both remaining games and earning one more yellow card. He played seven warm up games before the start of the second half of the season, including warm ups in Umag. Mamić continued the season in style scoring the first goal from a penalty in a 3–2 turnover victory against HNK Segesta and giving an assist to Karlo Majić for the equalizer. He scored the last goal in a 3–0 victory over NK Rudeš in the very next game from an assist from Bojan Knežević as well as the last goal in a 2–0 victory two games later against HNK Segesta after an assist by Tibor Halilović. Mamić played the next four matches before playing an excellent match, giving both assists in a 2–1 victory over NK Sesvete and earning a yellow card. He played another two games but was forced to miss out on the following match against HNK Gorica after having accumulated two yellow cards. He finished the season playing both remaining games.

=== 2016–17 season ===
==== Continued success with Dinamo Zagreb 2 ====
After the season ended Mamić played in all of the B team's five preseason warm-up games and started the following season playing the second half of the first game against NK Solin and earning a yellow card. He was then benched for the following two games in light of transfer negotiations with Cagliari Calcio but returned in the following match against NK Novigrad after the 2016 summer transfer window had closed. He went on to play the next three league matches, earning a further two yellow cards but then missed the next game after having been added to the first team's final roster for the 2016-17 UEFA Champions League. Ultimately he was not chosen for the game squad and so returned in the next league match but was again benched in the next game when, due to many player's absences, six first team players came on. He played the next game and then earned a yellow card and scored a last-minute goal in a 3–1 victory over NK Solin with Dinamo one player down. In the following game he accumulated a second yellow card causing him to miss the next game but returned immediately after and then gave an assist to Davor Lovren to put Dinamo ahead in a 1–2 loss against NK Lučko. He played the next game, receiving another yellow card, and missed the one after that a week before playing Dinamo's first game of the 2016–17 Premier League International Cup against Swansea City. He played the closing game of the half season and then the second match of the Premier League International Cup against Chelsea but was replaced by Kruno Ivančić in the last group match against Feyenoord. In mid January he started trials before the second half of the season but his transfer to Frosinone Calcio was announced before the end of the month.

==== Frosinone ====
Mamić was being eyed by a few Italian clubs (including Cagliari) before finally transferring to Frosinone Calcio, which had been relegated to Serie B in the previous season and was hoping to return to Serie A. Having been transferred before the start of the second half of the season he was given a trial period to prove himself on the field. After a lackluster performance in the trials his position in the team was uncertain but he then joined the youth team as a non-quota player for one game of the Campionato Nazionale Primavera against A.S. Roma. After that he was put on the first team for the thirtieth match day. However, he was benched for his first four games, missing out on a few training sessions between the second and third games due to a friendly with the Croatia U-21 team but managed to return to training immediately after to continue being benched. He then missed the next game only to be benched for two more games. After yet another absence, this time of four games, he returned to the bench for two more games and then missed out on the last game of the season. His final appearance on the bench was for the first leg of the semi-final of the promotional play-offs. Having played zero minutes on the field and only nine games on the bench, Mamić had left no discernible mark on the team and was rumored to be loaned out to allow him to play more regularly. However, with his trial period finished and Frosinone remaining in Serie B, his departure was completed by the end of July.

=== 2017–18 season ===
==== Inter Zaprešić ====
A little over two weeks after leaving Frosinone, it was announced that Mamić was joining NK Inter Zaprešić to strengthen its defense, along with Mato Grgić, after Jakov Filipović had left. His first game for Inter was a friendly 0–5 loss against SK Sturm Graz. Mamić, again donning the number 3, made his competitive debut for Inter and return to the Croatian First Football League on 10 September 2017, earning a yellow card, in a 0–3 loss against his former club NK Lokomotiva. He played four further league games, giving an assist for the equalizer to Tomislav Šarić and earning a yellow card in the second game against HNK Cibalia as well as earning another yellow in the fourth game against NK Slaven Belupo and then missed out on one game. He also played two Cup games before scoring his first league goal for the team in a 1–1 draw against NK Istra 1961. He played the next four league games, receiving yellow cards in the latter three, forcing him to miss the following match. He finished the year playing the last game of the half season and the Cup quarter-final.

Mamić joined the team in warm-ups before the beginning of the second half of the season and then went with the team to Medulin, returning to the Arena Kup after three years. He played all three group matches, doubling the team's lead in the last game with a header in a 2–0 victory over FK Borac Banja Luka and cementing their spot in the final. He went on to play the final, with Inter securing the cup in a 1–0 victory over NK Lokomotiva. He finished the warm-ups with the team in one last friendly and then started the latter half of the season playing in the first two games, earning a yellow card in the first one. He was benched for the third game but returned to the starting roster in the very next game and then scored a goal in the following game against NK Lokomotiva which was misjudged offside only to give an own goal assist to Lokomotiva's Toni Datković, thus securing Inter a 2–3 turnover victory. He missed out on the following game because of the 2019 UEFA European Under-21 Championship qualification and returned for the following two games but was then again absent for a game. He joined the team for a friendly charity game against NK Međimurec and returned as a substitute in the next league game. Mamić played the remaining six games of the season in the starting roster, earning a yellow in the first of these, as well as playing two more friendlies. With the season coming to an end, rumors started circulating that Mamić, who still contractually had one more season with Inter, was being eyed by a few other Croatian clubs, namely Dinamo and Rijeka.

=== 2018–19 season ===
==== Rijeka ====
On 15 June HNK Rijeka officially announced that Mamić had been transferred to the team and three days later during his introduction confirmed it to be on a four-year contract to compete with Leonard Zhuta for the starting left back position. He debuted for the team wearing the number 19 on 22 June in a friendly against Balzan F.C. and scored his first (and second) goal for the team in the very next friendly on 27 June against NK Kraljevica. He played in the following six friendlies giving assists in three of them. As the season started, Mamić had to wait for the second game to debut on the bench wearing the number 3, after two more absences in the league (as well as the Europa League) played another friendly and then after a final league absence debuted as a last-minute substitute on 2 September in a 1–1 draw against GNK Dinamo before missing out the next friendly due to obligations with the national under-21 team. Upon returning he immediately played his first full game in the starting roster on 16 September in a 1–1 draw against NK Osijek as Zhuta was injured but was then benched for the next league game with his position taken up by right-back Mario Pavelić. With Zhuta back in form, he was benched in the first round of the Cup and completely off the team for the next six matches, only playing the second round of the Cup and being called up for two fixtures with the national under-21 side again. He came back to the bench and on against Dinamo on 24 November as a right-back substitute after Momčilo Raspopović had been injured. He finally returned to his natural position and the starting roster in the next game as Zhuta had accumulated yellows, playing the full match, earning a yellow and finished the first half of the season on the bench on both the Cup quarter-final and last league match.

As Leonard Zhuta had been transferred to Konyaspor in the winter transfer window, a new first squad left-back option had to be decided upon. Petar went to Albufeira with the team on warm-ups before the second half of the season and played in all three friendlies, as well as the last friendly, played on home-ground. As the second half of the season started, Mamić became a standard member of the starting roster playing full-time in the first seven games, beginning with a 1–1 draw against NK Slaven Belupo in which he even had a chance at goal. In this set of games, he gave two assists, one to Maxwell Acosty against HNK Gorica on 2 February and one to Jakov Puljić against GNK Dinamo on 10 March, both for the leading goal in games that would eventually end in 1–3 losses. He also received a yellow card in the latter game and second overall after having received one four games prior. As he had been called up for the national under-21 side once again, he missed out on the next league match as well as a friendly. Upon returning he played three games but then missed out on the following two due to a suspected strain. Mamić returned to for the Cup semi-final and next league game in which he earned a yellow card. After a benching, Petar played full-time in the next two matches, earning a yellow and giving an assist to Antonio Čolak for the leading goal in the second one on 15 May, an eventual 1–2 loss against NK Osijek. He only played the last nine minutes of the following game due to a progression of osteomyelitis of the pubis and because of this finished the season on the bench in both the last league game, as well as the Cup final.

=== 2019–20 season ===
==== Long recovery and quiet suspension in Rijeka ====
Still recovering from the osteomyelitis which had plagued him for the last nine rounds of the previous season, and in view of HNK Rijeka rejecting a proposition to acquire Giorgos Valerianos while at the same time eyeing Abdu Conté, both left backs, Mamić joined the team on trials on 17 June and started them in style by scoring the opening goal in a friendly 3–1 victory over NK Bravo on 21 June. However, seeing as he had not adequately recovered, Mamić was unable to join the team on the rest of the trials in Rijeka and Kranjska Gora and then missed out on the Croatian Super Cup and all four of Rijeka's games in the UEFA Europa League third qualifying round and Play-off round as well as the first five rounds of the League. He finally returned to the bench for the next round on 1 September against NK Inter and on to the pitch in the next game, a friendly against HNK Šibenik on 7 September. Mamić continued being benched for the following five rounds before yet another absence, but appeared in the Cup, playing full-time in both the Second round on 1 October against NK Buje, scoring the seventh goal in an 11–0 victory, as well as the Round of sixteen on 30 October against NK Varaždin, scoring the opener in a minimal 2–1 victory. Between these cup games, Mamić played two friendlies but was again benched for a game after helping his team to the Cup quarter-finals. He at last debuted in the new season on 10 November and received a yellow in a devastating 0–5 loss against GNK Dinamo. Following this, Petar was, along with Roberto Punčec, Zoran Kvržić and Lorenco Šimić, removed from the first team squad. Seeing as Rijeka didn't have an active second squad and the players were too old to play in the youth teams and were so given a separate training regiment, the Croatian Football Syndicate filed an appeal against this decision on the grounds of every player having a right to train and play with the rest of their designated squad. However, since this was a commonplace practice in Croatian football, the appeal fell on deaf ears and due to all this, Mamić was absent from the remaining five games of the half-season.

==== Loan to Varaždin ====
As the second half of the season approached, Petar's fate was still unknown. He had missed out on all the preseason warm-ups as well as the Cup quarter-finals. As for his suspended teammates, Roberto Punčec had left the club two weeks after their suspension and had joined Sporting Kansas City ten days later, Zoran Kvržić had transferred to Kayserispor on 9 January 2020 and Lorenco Šimić's loan had been transferred to DAC Dunajská Streda on 6 February, leaving Mamić the sole suspended player one round into the start of the second half of the season. Having returned left back Daniel Štefulj from his loan to NK Varaždin on 11 January, it had become obvious that HNK Rijeka had no intention of rehabilitating Mamić. A month after this development, on 10 February, two rounds into the season, Mamić was loaned out to NK Varaždin and joined the team on the bench in the next round against NK Inter. He debuted full-time in the following game against NK Lokomotiva on 21 February and earned a yellow, becoming a starter then on. After playing a friendly and two more league games he earned yet another yellow and was so absent from the next game due to accumulated cards. Mamić then scored his first goal for the team in a 3-1 friendly victory over NK Kustošija on 10 March. Three days before the next league round, the Croatian Football Federation suspended all competitions under its jurisdiction due to the ongoing COVID-19 pandemic and the club soon followed suit suspending all senior team practice on 15 March.

Following relaxed pandemic measures, over six weeks after their suspension, senior team practice resumed on 27 April and Petar played in all three friendly warm up games. He resumed the league along with the rest of the team on 6 June against GNK Dinamo and following a goalless draw scored his first league goal for the team on 16 June in a 3–2 victory over HNK Hajduk even earning himself a spot in Telesport's ideal XI of the league's 29th round. After yet another win, Mamić gave an assist to Jorge Obregón in a 1–0 victory over NK Inter on 25 June and was pronounced man of the match as well as earning a second spot in Telesport's ideal XI. He played the remaining five games of the season as a starter, playing the last four full-time and securing Varaždin's spot in the top tier of Croatian football for the next season in the third game.

=== 2020–21 season ===
==== Raków Częstochowa ====
Petar played in NK Varaždin's only preseason warm-up and was expected to be permanently transferred to the club. However, as the season progressed, Petar's loan was not extended amidst negotiations with NK Istra 1961. Ultimately his contract with HNK Rijeka was terminated on 10 September as negotiations with Istra fell through and talks of interest from Cracovia and some Romanian clubs surfaced. Finally, Mamić reached an agreement with Ekstraklasa side Raków Częstochowa the following day on a two-year contract. Five rounds later, on 17 October, Mamić at last debuted on the bench. Following this, however, Petar remained on the bench for the next two league rounds as well as the Round of 32 of the Polish Cup before missing out on the next league game. Ultimately, Mamić finished the half-season on the bench in the remaining four games as reports of his transfer to Podbeskidzie Bielsko-Biała surfaced.

==== Podbeskidzie Bielsko-Biała ====
A little under three weeks after the first reports of his potential transfer to Podbeskidzie, Mamić's transfer was confirmed on 9 January 2021 on a contract to the end of the season with an option of extending it for an additional year and immediately debuted for the team the same day playing the first half of its first warm-up game before the continuation of the season against Czech side SFC Opava. He played the next friendly and then joined the team on trials in Poreč where he played in both remaining friendlies. Upon returning to Poland, Petar made his Ekstraklasa debut on 31 January, playing the full 90 minutes and earning a yellow card in a 1–0 victory over Legia Warsaw. He played the following four matches full-time before being substituted in the last minutes of the next one. He then received a concussion on 15 March in the following game against Stal Mielec, forcing an injury substitution after which he missed out on the next two league games. Petar returned in a friendly on 26 March but played for only part of the second half and was then benched for the following two league games. He at last returned to the league pitch in style on 20 April, giving an assist to Rafał Janicki for the team's opening goal and equalizer before being substituted out in an eventual 3–4 loss to Śląsk Wrocław. Even though he remained a starter, Petar did not play full-time in any of the remaining four league matches but did give an assist on 8 May to Jakub Hora for the leading goal in an eventual 1–1 tie with Wisła Płock. With Podbeskidzie ending up relegated and Petar being one of the club's more expensive players, they amicably agreed not to extend his contract, leaving him a free agent on 18 June.

=== 2021–22 season ===
==== Hrvatski Dragovoljac ====
A week after the 2021 summer transfer window had closed, news surfaced that Petar was returning to the Croatian First Football League and joining newly promoted NK Hrvatski Dragovoljac in yet another bid to avoid relegation.

== International career ==
Mamić debuted for the Croatian under-14 team on 26 May 2010 playing a friendly against Bavaria. Later that year he joined the under-15 team and played six friendlies throughout the season. After a short hiatus he joined the national under-16 side eventually competing in eight friendlies.

=== Croatia under-17 ===
Mamić made his debut for the Croatia under-17 team on 1 August 2012 in a friendly against the Czech Republic scoring his first ever international goal only two days later in a friendly against Serbia. Mamić was selected for the 2013 UEFA European Under-17 Championship qualification team. He played a good first game against Israel receiving a yellow card only to score his first competitive goal in the second match against Kazakhstan. After qualifying for the Elite round Mamić scored the first goal against Spain after a corner kick in the 45' minute eventually leading to Croatia's victory. Petar played the rest of the qualifications qualifying for the European Championship and after two goalless games received a red card in the final game against Ukraine. In October Mamić, having missed the first game of the World Cup, played a very good game against Panama and played a somewhat weaker game against Uzbekistan eventually being replaced by Ivan Fiolić.

=== Croatia under-19 ===
Besides playing three friendlies with the Croatian under-18 team Mamić was called in for the Croatia national under-19 football team and debuted on 12 August 2013 in a friendly against Azerbaijan playing 79 minutes before being replaced by Luka Capan. Mamić was also called in for the 2015 UEFA European Under-19 Championship qualification playing full-time in all three games earning a yellow card in the third game against Turkey and qualifying for the Elite Round. Mamić played the first and third game in the Elite Round with both ending in draws but ultimately failed to qualify for the 2015 UEFA European Under-19 Championship.

=== Croatia under-21 ===
Mamić participated in three day trials for the Croatia national under-21 football team in Sveti Martin na Muri and debuted for the team on 23 March 2017, playing the last half hour, in a friendly 3–0 win over Slovenia. He joined the team for the autumn 2017 part of the 2019 UEFA European Under-21 Championship qualification and debuted in the competition as a last-minute substitute in a 5–1 victory over the Czech Republic on 9 October 2017. He accompanied the team for the entire qualifying tournament and played full-time in the last game against San Marino on 15 October 2018. He played the team's following match, a friendly against France on 15 November 2018, and another against Italy on 25 March 2019. He was named in the preliminary squad for the Euro but eventually missed the cut due to osteomyelitis and so didn't accompany the team for two friendlies as well as the entire tournament.

== Player profile ==
Mamić is a player with strong physical attributes and pace. He has been described as the best left-back of his generation in the GNK Dinamo Zagreb Academy. Exclusively a left-sided player, his natural role is that of a defensive full-back. He occasionally advances along the flank toward the opposing goal, where he can deliver crosses or take shots. He is an admirer of Andrew Robertson but doesn't try to emulate anyone's specific style. He is most at home playing in tandem with a player in front who can take up finishing roles, either a left midfielder like Alexander Gorgon in HNK Rijeka or a left winger like Domagoj Bradarić in the Croatia national under-21 football team.

== Personal life ==
Petar, just like fellow players Niko Kranjčar and Andrej Kramarić, graduated, in 2014, from the prestigious XV Gymnasium in Zagreb. He is currently enrolled in the Faculty of Economics and Business of the University of Zagreb and is working on his master's thesis in accounting titled "Taxation of Athletes in Croatia".

His father Ivica (pronounced [ǐʋit͡sä]) played for Dinamo's cadets along with football coach Nikola Jurčević who is Petar's confirmation sponsor. He is also a distant relation of football manager brothers Zoran and Zdravko Mamić as both families trace routes to the village of Zidine.

Petar participated on 14 August 2021 in a charitable event organized by Serbian owned Croatian gambling company Germania Sport by betting, correctly, on a humanitarian ballot on the outcome of five games and winning 4220 Kuna for the Orphanage in Nazor's Street in Zagreb.

== Career statistics ==
As of match played 12 September 2026

Appearances and goals by club, season and competition
Club	Season	League			National cup (Note: Includes Croatian Cup, Lithuanian Cup, Romanian Cup, Bosnian Cup)		Continental		Other		Total	
Club	Season	Division	Apps	Goals	Apps	Goals	Apps	Goals	Apps	Goals	Apps	Goals
Dinamo Zagreb	2013–14	Croatian First League	1	0	—		—		—		1	0
Dinamo Zagreb	2015–16	Croatian First League	0	0	1	0	—		—		1	0
Dinamo Zagreb	Total		1	0	1	0	—		—		2	0
Dinamo Zagreb II	2014–15	Croatian Third League	13	1	—		—		—		13	1
Dinamo Zagreb II	2015–16	Croatian Second League	25	4	—		—		—		25	4
Dinamo Zagreb II	2016–17	Croatian Second League	13	1	—		—		—		13	1
Dinamo Zagreb II	Total		51	6	—		—		—		51	6
Lokomotiva (loan)	2014–15	Croatian First League	9	0	2	0	—		—		11	0
Lokomotiva (loan)	2015–16	Croatian First League	0	0	—		1 (Note: Appearance in UEFA Europa League)	0	—		1	0
Lokomotiva (loan)	Total		9	0	2	0	1	0	—		12	0
Inter Zaprešić	2017–18	Croatian First League	24	1	3	0	—		—		27	1
Rijeka	2018–19	Croatian First League	18	0	2	0	—		—		20	0
Rijeka	2019–20	Croatian First League	1	0	2	2	—		—		3	2
Rijeka	Total		19	0	4	2	—		—		23	2
Varaždin (loan)	2019–20	Croatian First League	13	1	—		—		—		13	1
Podbeskidzie	2020–21	Ekstraklasa	12	0	—		—		—		12	0
Hrvatski Dragovoljac	2021–22	Croatian First League	11	0	—		—		—		11	0
Žalgiris	2022	A Lyga	28	3	2	0	—		1 (Note: Appearance in the Lithuanian Supercup)	0	31	3
Žalgiris	2023	A Lyga	24	1	2	0	13 (Note: Six appearances in UEFA Champions League, one appearance in UEFA Europa League, six appearances in UEFA Europa Conference League)	0	—		39	1
Žalgiris	Total		52	4	4	0	13	0	1	0	70	4
Žalgiris	2023	A Lyga	0	0	—		3 (Note: One appearance in UEFA Champions League, two appearances in UEFA Europa Conference League)	0	—		3	0
CFR Cluj	2023–24	Liga I	3	0	1	0	—		—		4	0
Zrinjski Mostar	2024–25	Bosnian Premier League	15	0	2	0	2 (Note: Appearance(s) in UEFA Conference League)	0	1 (Note: Appearance(s) in the Bosnian Supercup)	0	20	0
Zrinjski Mostar	2025–26	Bosnian Premier League	27	2	4	0	14 (Note: Four appearances and one goal in UEFA Champions League, three appearances in UEFA Europa League, seven appearances in UEFA Conference League)	1	1	0	46	3
Zrinjski Mostar	2026–27	Bosnian Premier League	7	0	0	0	1	0	—		8	0
Zrinjski Mostar	Total		49	2	6	0	17	1	2	0	74	3
Career total			244	14	21	2	34	1	4	0	303	17

== Honours ==
Dinamo Zagreb

- Prva HNL: 2013–14, 2015–16
- Croatian Cup: 2015–16
- Croatian Super Cup runner-up: 2014

Rijeka

- Croatian Cup: 2018–19
- Croatian Super Cup runner-up: 2019

Žalgiris

- A Lyga: 2022
- Lithuanian Cup: 2022
- Lithuanian Supercup: 2023

Zrinjski Mostar

- Bosnian Premier League: 2024–25
- Bosnian Supercup: 2024
