= 2019–20 HNK Rijeka season =

Rijeka
2019–20 season
- Chairman: Damir Mišković
- Manager: Igor Bišćan (until 22 Sep 2019); Simon Rožman (since 23 Sep 2019)
- Stadium: Rujevica
- Prva HNL: 3rd
- Croatian Cup: Winners
- UEFA Europa League: Play-off round
- Croatian Supercup: Runners-up
- Top goalscorer: League: Antonio Čolak (20); All: Antonio Čolak (26)
- Highest home attendance: 7,562 v (Belgium) Gent (29 August 2019)
- Lowest home attendance: 2,071 v Gorica (26 June 2020)
- Average home league attendance: 4,088
| Home colours | Away colours |

The 2019–20 season was the 74th season in HNK Rijeka’s history. It was their 29th successive season in the Croatian First Football League, and 46th successive top tier season.

== Competitions ==
=== Overall ===
| Competition | First match | Last match | Starting round | Final position | Record | | | | | | | |
| Competition | First match | Last match | Starting round | Final position | G | W | D | L | GF | GA | GD | Win % |
|---|---|---|---|---|---|---|---|---|---|---|---|---|
| HT Prva liga | 20 Jul 2019 | 25 Jul 2020 | Matchday 1 | 3rd | 36 | 19 | 7 | 10 | 58 | 42 | +16 | 52.78 |
| Croatian Cup | 1 Oct 2019 | 1 Aug 2020 | First round | Winners | 5 | 5 | 0 | 0 | 18 | 3 | +15 | 100.00 |
| Europa League | 8 Aug 2019 | 29 Aug 2019 | Third qualifying round | Play-off round | 4 | 2 | 1 | 1 | 6 | 3 | +3 | 50.00 |
| Croatian Supercup | 13 Jul 2019 | 13 Jul 2019 | Final | Runners-up | 1 | 0 | 0 | 1 | 0 | 1 | −1 | 0.00 |
| Total | | | | | 46 | 26 | 8 | 12 | 82 | 49 | +33 | 56.52 |

Last updated: 1 August 2020.

=== HT Prva liga ===
==== Classification ====
| Pos | Team | Pld | W | D | L | GF | GA | GD | Pts | Qualification or relegation |
|---|---|---|---|---|---|---|---|---|---|---|
| 1 | Dinamo Zagreb (C) | 36 | 25 | 5 | 6 | 62 | 20 | +42 | 80 | Qualification for the Champions League second qualifying round |
| 2 | Lokomotiva | 36 | 19 | 8 | 9 | 57 | 38 | +19 | 65 | Qualification for the Champions League second qualifying round |
| 3 | Rijeka | 36 | 19 | 7 | 10 | 58 | 42 | +16 | 64 | Qualification for the Europa League third qualifying round |
| 4 | Osijek | 36 | 17 | 11 | 8 | 47 | 29 | +18 | 62 | Qualification for the Europa League second qualifying round |
| 5 | Hajduk Split | 36 | 18 | 6 | 12 | 60 | 41 | +19 | 60 | Qualification for the Europa League second qualifying round |

Source: PrvaHNL.hr
Rules for classification: 1) Points; 2) Head-to-head points; 3) Head-to-head goal difference; 4) Head-to-head goals scored (at home if two teams tied); 5) Goal difference; 6) Goals scored; 7) Play-off
(Note: Criteria 2-4 and 7 is only used if deciding champion, teams to international competition or teams for relegation and in that case criteria 6 will not be used).
(C) Champions

==== Results summary ====
| Overall | | | | | | | | Home | | | | | | Away | | | | | |
| Pld | W | D | L | GF | GA | GD | Pts | W | D | L | GF | GA | GD | W | D | L | GF | GA | GD |
|---|---|---|---|---|---|---|---|---|---|---|---|---|---|---|---|---|---|---|---|
| 36 | 19 | 7 | 10 | 58 | 42 | +16 | 64 | 10 | 5 | 3 | 32 | 21 | +11 | 9 | 2 | 7 | 26 | 21 | +5 |

Last updated: 25 July 2020.
Source: Competitive matches

==== Results by round ====
| Round | 1 | 2 | 3 | 4 | 5 | 6 | 7 | 8 | 9 | 10 | 11 | 12 | 13 | 14 | 15 | 16 | 17 | 18 | 19 | 20 | 21 | 22 | 23 | 24 | 25 | 26 | 27 | 28 | 29 | 30 | 31 | 32 | 33 | 34 | 35 | 36 |
|---|---|---|---|---|---|---|---|---|---|---|---|---|---|---|---|---|---|---|---|---|---|---|---|---|---|---|---|---|---|---|---|---|---|---|---|---|
| Ground | H | A | H | A | H | A | H | H | A | A | H | A | H | A | H | A | A | H | H | A | H | A | H | A | H | H | A | A | H | A | H | A | H | A | A | H |
| Result | W | W | W | L | D | L | D | D | W | W | D | W | L | L | L | W | W | W | W | L | W | D | W | L | W | W | W | D | D | L | L | L | W | W | W | W |
| Position | 4 | 3 | 3 | 3 | 3 | 4 | 4 | 4 | 3 | 3 | 4 | 3 | 3 | 4 | 5 | 4 | 3 | 3 | 3 | 4 | 3 | 4 | 3 | 3 | 3 | 2 | 2 | 3 | 2 | 4 | 5 | 5 | 4 | 4 | 4 | 3 |

Updated to match(es) played on 25 July 2020. Source: Competitive matches
A = Away; H = Home; W = Win; D = Draw; L = Loss

==== Results by opponent ====
| Team | Results | | | | Points |
| Team | 1 | 2 | 3 | 4 | Points |
|---|---|---|---|---|---|
| Dinamo Zagreb | 0–3 | 0–5 | 0–4 | 2–0 | 3 |
| Gorica | 0–2 | 1–2 | 0–0 | 1–2 | 1 |
| Hajduk Split | 1–1 | 4–0 | 2–0 | 3–2 | 10 |
| Inter Zaprešić | 1–1 | 4–1 | 4–1 | 1–0 | 10 |
| Istra 1961 | 3–0 | 2–0 | 3–1 | 4–2 | 12 |
| Lokomotiva | 1–0 | 1–1 | 1–2 | 2–2 | 5 |
| Osijek | 1–1 | 2–3 | 1–0 | 0–1 | 4 |
| Slaven Belupo | 3–1 | 2–1 | 1–0 | 0–1 | 9 |
| Varaždin | 2–1 | 2–0 | 3–1 | 0–0 | 10 |

Source: 2019–20 Croatian First Football League article

== Matches ==
=== HT Prva liga ===
| 20 July 2019 1 | Rijeka | 2–1 | Varaždin | Rijeka |
| 19:00 CEST (UTC+02:00) | Murić 7', 58' | Report | 22' (yellow card) 63' Kolarić; (yellow card) 66' Jertec; (yellow card) 70' Benko; (yellow card) 90+2' Senić | Stadium: Rujevica; Attendance: 4,675; Referee: Dario Bel (Osijek) |

| 27 July 2019 2 | Lokomotiva | 0–1 | Rijeka | Zagreb |
| 21:00 CEST (UTC+02:00) | Uzuni (yellow card) 64'; Karačić (yellow card) 75'; Petrak (yellow card) 82' | Report | (yellow card) 12' Pavičić; (yellow card) 66' Lepinjica; 90+2' Čolak | Stadium: Kranjčevićeva; Attendance: 829; Referee: Mario Zebec (Cestica) |

| 3 August 2019 3 | Rijeka | 3–1 | Slaven Belupo | Rijeka |
| 21:00 CEST (UTC+02:00) | Čolak 24'; Lončar 30'; Lepinjica (yellow card) 38'; Punčec (yellow card) 42'; Tomečak 73' | Report | (yellow card) 28' Iharoš; (yellow card) 45+1' Glavčić; 47' Krstanović; (yellow card) 83' Međimorec | Stadium: Rujevica; Attendance: 4,289; Referee: Ante Čuljak (Zagreb) |

| 11 August 2019 4 | Gorica | 2–0 | Rijeka | Velika Gorica |
| 20:00 CEST (UTC+02:00) | Mathieu (yellow card) 40'; Ndiaye 45+1'; Musa (yellow card) 47'; Suk 67' | Report | (yellow card) 49' Punčec; (yellow card) 75' Iglesias; (yellow card) 77' Lepinjica | Stadium: Radnik; Attendance: 2,893; Referee: Dario Bel (Osijek) |

| 18 August 2019 5 | Rijeka | 1–1 | Osijek | Rijeka |
| 20:00 CEST (UTC+02:00) | Čolak (yellow card) 29' (goal) 34'; Murić (yellow card) 41'; Capan (yellow card) 90+3'; Kvržić (yellow card) 90+3' | Report | (yellow card) 10' Mance; (yellow card) 33' Majstorović; 86' Žaper | Stadium: Rujevica; Attendance: 4,832; Referee: Duje Strukan (Split) |

| 1 September 2019 7 | Rijeka | 1–1 | Inter Zaprešić | Rijeka |
| 20:00 CEST (UTC+02:00) | Punčec (yellow card) 1'; Murić (yellow card) 22'; Gorgon 31'; Lepinjica (yellow card) 35' | Report | 2' (pen.) (yellow card) 79' Mamut; (yellow card) 11' Mlinar; (yellow card) 21' Postonjski; (yellow card) 22' Mazalović; (yellow card) 52' Savić; (yellow card) 79' Ljubić; (yellow card) 81' Soldo; (yellow card) 89' Matković | Stadium: Rujevica; Attendance: 3,529; Referee: Ante Čuljak (Zagreb) |

| 15 September 2019 8 | Rijeka | 1–1 | Hajduk Split | Rijeka |
| 19:00 CEST (UTC+02:00) | Andrijašević 31'; Capan (yellow card) 64' | Report | (yellow card) 25' Jurić; (yellow card) 40' Jairo; (yellow card) 58' Jakoliš; (yellow card) 66' Bradarić; 78' Teklić | Stadium: Rujevica; Attendance: 7,108; Referee: Fran Jović (Zagreb) |

| 22 September 2019 9 | Istra 1961 | 0–3 | Rijeka | Pula |
| 19:00 CEST (UTC+02:00) | Ivančić (yellow card) 10' (yellow-red card) 41' | Report | 6' Andrijašević; 45' Lončar; (yellow card) 60' Escoval; (yellow card) 70' Halilović; 77' Murić | Stadium: Aldo Drosina; Attendance: 2,797; Referee: Igor Pajač (Sveti Ivan Zelina) |

| 28 September 2019 10 | Varaždin | 0–2 | Rijeka | Varaždin |
| 16:30 CEST (UTC+02:00) | Đurasek (yellow card) 38' (yellow-red card) 69'; Senić (yellow card) 87' | Report | 12' Escoval; 36' (yellow card) 90+1' Halilović; (yellow card) 52' Župarić; (yellow card) 90' Murić | Stadium: Varteks; Attendance: 1,946; Referee: Igor Pajač (Sveti Ivan Zelina) |

| 6 October 2019 11 | Rijeka | 1–1 | Lokomotiva | Rijeka |
| 19:00 CEST (UTC+02:00) | Halilović (yellow card) 14'; Acosty (yellow card) 28'; Andrijašević 45+1' | Report | (yellow card) 38' Marković; (yellow card) 39' Jakić; 49' (yellow card) 84' Uzuni; (yellow card) 55' Çokaj; (yellow card) 74' Assane | Stadium: Rujevica; Attendance: 4,835; Referee: Igor Pajač (Sveti Ivan Zelina) |

| 19 October 2019 12 | Slaven Belupo | 1–2 | Rijeka | Koprivnica |
| 17:30 CEST (UTC+02:00) | Radivojević 14' | Report | 74' Gorgon; 90' Acosty | Stadium: Gradski; Attendance: 1,258; Referee: Tihomir Pejin (Donji Miholjac) |

| 26 October 2019 13 | Rijeka | 1–2 | Gorica | Rijeka |
| 17:30 CEST (UTC+02:00) | Smolčić (yellow card) 68' (yellow-red card) 90'; Tomečak 82' | Report | 62' (yellow card) 63' Zwoliński; (yellow card) 88' Čelić; (yellow card) 89' Lovrić; 90+2' Dvorneković | Stadium: Rujevica; Attendance: 4,117; Referee: Duje Strukan (Split) |

| 3 November 2019 14 | Osijek | 3–2 | Rijeka | Osijek |
| 17:30 CET (UTC+01:00) | Majstorović (yellow card) 44'; Marić 65'; Lopa 79'; Žaper 88' | Report | (yellow card) 36' Gorgon; 37' Čolak; 45' Župarić; (yellow card) 60' Lepinjica; (yellow card) 63' Andrijašević; (yellow card) 66' Lončar | Stadium: Gradski Vrt; Attendance: 3,550; Referee: Fran Jović (Zagreb) |

| 10 November 2019 15 | Rijeka | 0–5 | Dinamo Zagreb | Rijeka |
| 17:30 CET (UTC+01:00) | Mamić (yellow card) 11'; Andrijašević (yellow card) 13'; Lepinjica (yellow card) 51' | Report | 14' Ivanušec; 18' 26' 70' Oršić; 20' Stojanović; (yellow card) 21' Kądzior; (yellow card) 37' Leovac; (yellow card) 50' Perić | Stadium: Rujevica; Attendance: 5,517; Referee: Mario Zebec (Cestica) |

| 24 November 2019 16 | Inter Zaprešić | 1–4 | Rijeka | Zaprešić |
| 17:30 CET (UTC+01:00) | Mitrović (yellow card) 72'; Mazalović (yellow card) 78'; Soldo 90+1' | Report | 6' Andrijašević; 23' 28' Čolak; 32' Gorgon; (yellow card) 79' Tomečak | Stadium: ŠRC Zaprešić; Attendance: 820; Referee: Tihomir Pejin (Donji Miholjac) |

| 1 December 2019 17 | Hajduk Split | 0–4 | Rijeka | Split |
| 17:30 CET (UTC+01:00) | Nejašmić (yellow card) 21'; Jradi (yellow card) 42'; Caktaš (yellow card) 49'; Barry (yellow card) 86'; Jurić (yellow card) 90+5' | Report | (yellow card) 15' (goal) 43' Acosty; 83' Raspopović; 87' Gorgon; (yellow card) 89' Andrijašević; 90+3' (yellow card) 90+5' Halilović; (yellow card) 90+5' Prskalo | Stadium: Poljud; Attendance: 13,605; Referee: Fran Jović (Zagreb) |

| 8 December 2019 18 | Rijeka | 2–0 | Istra 1961 | Rijeka |
| 17:30 CET (UTC+01:00) | Gorgon 15'; Murić 28' | Report | (yellow card) 34' Galilea; (yellow card) 57' Tomašević; (yellow card) 69' Bosančić; (yellow card) 71' Gržan; (yellow card) 74' Obeng | Stadium: Rujevica; Attendance: 4,045; Referee: Igor Pajač (Sveti Ivan Zelina) |

| 14 December 2019 19 | Rijeka | 3–1 | Varaždin | Rijeka |
| 15:00 CET (UTC+01:00) | Acosty 12'; Čolak 47' 90'; Escoval (yellow card) 73' | Report | (yellow card) 30' Prce; 83' (pen.) Glavica; (yellow card) 90' Štefulj | Stadium: Rujevica; Attendance: 3,865; Referee: Ivan Vučković (Zagreb) |

| 18 December 2019 6 | Dinamo Zagreb | 3–0 | Rijeka | Zagreb |
| 18:00 CET (UTC+01:00) | Olmo 9' (yellow card) 36'; Oršić 17'; Perić (yellow card) 23'; Petković 56' (pen.) | Report | (yellow card) 49' Smolčić | Stadium: Maksimir; Attendance: 3,968; Referee: Tihomir Pejin (Donji Miholjac) |

| 1 February 2020 20 | Lokomotiva | 2–1 | Rijeka | Zagreb |
| 15:00 CET (UTC+01:00) | Kastrati 45', 71' | Report | (yellow card) 38' Lepinjica; (yellow card) 76' Andrijašević; 86' Lončar | Stadium: Kranjčevićeva; Attendance: 863; Referee: Damir Batinić (Osijek) |

| 9 February 2020 21 | Rijeka | 1–0 | Slaven Belupo | Rijeka |
| 15:00 CET (UTC+01:00) | Lončar (yellow card) 13'; Čolak 33' (yellow card) 40'; Lepinjica (yellow card) 55' | Report | (yellow card) 53' Bačelić-Grgić; (yellow card) 69' Glavčić; (red card) 72' Mikulić; (yellow card) 90+1' Mateus | Stadium: Rujevica; Attendance: 3,532; Referee: Marko Matoc (Zaprešić) |

| 16 February 2020 22 | Gorica | 0–0 | Rijeka | Velika Gorica |
| 17:30 CET (UTC+01:00) | Čabraja (yellow card) 26'; Čanađija (yellow card) 46'; Jovičić (yellow card) 79'; Lovrić (yellow card) 81' | Report | (yellow card) 19' Halilović; (yellow card) 49' Escoval; (yellow card) 61' Smolčić; (yellow card) 81' Velkovski; (yellow card) 90+1' Čolak | Stadium: Radnik; Attendance: 2,137; Referee: Fran Jović (Zagreb) |

| 22 February 2020 23 | Rijeka | 1–0 | Osijek | Rijeka |
| 17:30 CET (UTC+01:00) | Gorgon (yellow card) 6' (goal) 11'; Lepinjica (yellow card) 28' | Report | (yellow card) 8' (red card) 90' Škorić; (yellow card) 66' Žaper | Stadium: Rujevica; Attendance: 5,204; Referee: Duje Strukan (Split) |

| 29 February 2020 24 | Dinamo Zagreb | 4–0 | Rijeka | Zagreb |
| 17:30 CET (UTC+01:00) | Ademi 1' (yellow card) 39'; Kądzior 81' (yellow card) 82'; Oršić 85'; Gojak 90+3' | Report | (yellow card) 23' Capan | Stadium: Maksimir; Attendance: 5,497; Referee: Duje Strukan (Split) |

| 3 March 2020 25 | Rijeka | 4–1 | Inter Zaprešić | Rijeka |
| 19:00 CET (UTC+01:00) | Čolak 9'; Lepinjica 41'; Galović 66' (yellow card) 87'; Murić 84' | Report | (yellow card) 24' Martić; (yellow card) 65' Barić; 70' Mamut; (yellow card) 87' Andrić | Stadium: Rujevica; Attendance: 3,376; Referee: Ivan Vučković (Zagreb) |

| 8 March 2020 26 | Rijeka | 2–0 | Hajduk Split | Rijeka |
| 17:30 CET (UTC+01:00) | Raspopović (yellow card) 30'; Capan (yellow card) 42'; Čolak 61'; Gorgon 72' (pen.) | Report | (yellow card) 37' Mujakić; (yellow card) 59' Jakoliš; (yellow card) 71' Caktaš | Stadium: Rujevica; Attendance: 7,326; Referee: Damir Batinić (Osijek) |

| 7 June 2020 27 | Istra 1961 | 1–3 | Rijeka | Pula |
| 18:55 CEST (UTC+02:00) | Galilea (yellow card) 3'; Perić-Komšić 88'; Gržan (yellow card) 89' | Report | 4' Lončar; 70' Čolak; 90+3' Murić | Stadium: Aldo Drosina; Attendance: Behind closed doors Referee: Dario Bel (Osijek) |

| 12 June 2020 28 | Varaždin | 0–0 | Rijeka | Varaždin |
| 18:55 CEST (UTC+02:00) | Tkalčić (yellow card) 16'; Glavina (yellow card) 73'; Obregón (yellow card) 75'; Glavica (yellow card) 90+1' | Report | (yellow card) 11' Lepinjica | Stadium: Varteks; Attendance: Behind closed doors Referee: Tihomir Pejin (Donji Miholjac) |

| 16 June 2020 29 | Rijeka | 2–2 | Lokomotiva | Rijeka |
| 21:05 CEST (UTC+02:00) | Capan (yellow card) 18' (yellow-red card) 83'; Andrijašević (yellow card) 32' (goal) 78'; Smolčić (yellow card) 65'; Yatéké 66' | Report | (yellow card) 27' (goal) 36' Kastrati; (yellow card) 38' Kovačić; (yellow card) 40' (goal) 87' (pen.) Karačić; (yellow card) 76' Halilović; (yellow card) 90' Jakić; (yellow card) 90+1' Kolinger | Stadium: Rujevica; Attendance: 2,584; Referee: Damir Batinić (Osijek) |

| 21 June 2020 30 | Slaven Belupo | 1–0 | Rijeka | Koprivnica |
| 18:55 CEST (UTC+02:00) | Mateus 30' (yellow card) 57'; Ježina (yellow card) 44'; Bačelić-Grgić (yellow card) 58'; Jeffrén (yellow card) 72'; Havelka (yellow card) 79'; Božić (yellow card) 85'; Lulić (yellow card) 90+1'; Goda (yellow card) 90+3' | Report | (yellow card) 26' Gorgon; (yellow card) 90+3' Halilović | Stadium: Gradski; Attendance: 753; Referee: Marko Matoc (Zaprešić) |

| 26 June 2020 31 | Rijeka | 1–2 | Gorica | Rijeka |
| 18:55 CEST (UTC+02:00) | Capan (yellow card) 11'; Escoval (yellow card) 49'; Lončar (yellow card) 67'; Pires 84' | Report | 12' (pen.) Lovrić; (yellow card) 24' Kalik; 79' Ndiaye; (yellow card) 88' Krizmanić | Stadium: Rujevica; Attendance: 2,071; Referee: Ivan Vučković (Zagreb) |

| 1 July 2020 32 | Osijek | 1–0 | Rijeka | Osijek |
| 21:05 CEST (UTC+02:00) | Škorić (yellow card) 25'; Mance 53' | Report | (yellow card) 84' Velkovski; (yellow card) 90' (yellow-red card) 90' Galović; (yellow card) 90+2' Halilović | Stadium: Gradski Vrt; Attendance: 3,026; Referee: Duje Strukan (Split) |

| 5 July 2020 33 | Rijeka | 2–0 | Dinamo Zagreb | Rijeka |
| 21:05 CEST (UTC+02:00) | Gvardiol 2' (o.g.); Pavičić (yellow card) 10'; Čolak 52'; Čeliković (yellow card) 89' | Report | (yellow card) 5' Gvardiol | Stadium: Rujevica; Attendance: 2,687; Referee: Damir Batinić (Osijek) |

| 11 July 2020 34 | Inter Zaprešić | 0–1 | Rijeka | Zaprešić |
| 18:55 CEST (UTC+02:00) | Mlinar (yellow card) 54'; Mazalović (yellow card) 62'; Nekić (yellow card) 82' | Report | (yellow card) 8' Pavičić; (yellow card) 54' Halilović; 71' (pen.) Čolak; (yellow card) 85' Braut | Stadium: ŠRC Zaprešić; Attendance: 312; Referee: Ivan Vučković (Zagreb) |

| 19 July 2020 35 | Hajduk Split | 2–3 | Rijeka | Split |
| 21:05 CEST (UTC+02:00) | Eduok 39'; Jurić (yellow card) 63'; Caktaš 69' (pen.) | Report | 19' 45' (yellow card) 45+1' Čolak; (yellow card) 57' Halilović; (yellow card) 72' Braut; (yellow card) 90' Lepinjica; 90+2' Galović | Stadium: Poljud; Attendance: Behind closed doors Referee: Damir Batinić (Osijek) |

| 25 July 2020 36 | Rijeka | 4–2 | Istra 1961 | Rijeka |
| 21:05 CEST (UTC+02:00) | Čolak 18', 24', 35' (pen.), 54'; Velkovski (yellow card) 78' | Report | (yellow card) 30' Gržan; 60', 78' (pen.) Guzina; (yellow card) 61' Rufati; (yellow card) 86' Tomašević; (yellow card) 87' Lončar | Stadium: Rujevica; Attendance: Behind closed doors Referee: Mario Zebec (Cestica) |

Source: Croatian Football Federation

=== Croatian Cup ===
| 1 October 2019 R1 | Buje | 0–11 | Rijeka | Buje |
| 15:30 CEST (UTC+02:00) | | Report | Murić 4' 81'; Čolak 10' 16'; Punčec 26' (yellow card) 33' (goal) 54'; Pavičić 31'; Mamić 66'; Lončar 74'; Vuk 80'; Smolčić 90' | Stadium: Gradski; Attendance: 1,150; Referee: Ivan Vučković (Zagreb) |

| 30 October 2019 R2 | Varaždin | 1–2 | Rijeka | Varaždin |
| 19:30 CET (UTC+01:00) | Senić (yellow card) 6'; Roca (yellow card) 49'; Milićević (yellow card) 81'; Vuk 83'; Kolarić (yellow card) 85'; Stolnik (yellow card) 90+4' | Report | Puljić (yellow card) 33'; Mamić 47'; Gorgon 54'; Župarić (yellow card) 85' | Stadium: Varteks; Attendance: 1,399; Referee: Igor Pajač (Sveti Ivan Zelina) |

| 5 February 2020 QF | Rijeka | 1–0 | Dinamo Zagreb | Rijeka |
| 17:00 CET (UTC+01:00) | Čolak 16' (yellow card) 90+1'; Lepinjica (yellow card) 21'; Acosty (yellow card) 84'; Escoval (yellow card) 86'; Smolčić (yellow card) 90' | Report | Leovac (yellow card) 73'; Dilaver (yellow card) 84'; Perić (yellow card) 87' | Stadium: Rujevica; Attendance: 4,257; Referee: Igor Pajač (Sveti Ivan Zelina) |

| 31 May 2020 SF | Rijeka | 3–2 | Osijek | Rijeka |
| 20:15 CEST (UTC+02:00) | Smolčić (yellow card) 17' (yellow-red card) 87'; Halilović (yellow card) 51'; Murić 66'; Čolak 73' (pen.); Velkovski (yellow card) 80'; Yatéké 86'; Lepinjica (yellow card) 90+1'; Capan (yellow card) 90+2' | Report | Bočkaj 17', 48'; Kleinheisler (yellow card) 24' (yellow-red card) 56'; Žaper (yellow card) 46'; Talys (yellow card) 70'; Jugović (yellow card) 72'; Ndockyt (yellow card) 90+1'; Igor Silva (yellow card) 90+1' | Stadium: Rujevica; Attendance: Behind closed doors Referee: Igor Pajač (Sveti Ivan Zelina) |

| 1 August 2020 Final | Rijeka | 1–0 | Lokomotiva | Šibenik |
| 20:30 CEST (UTC+02:00) | Escoval (yellow card) 66'; Velkovski (yellow card) 73'; Halilović 77'; Lepinjica (yellow card) 79' | Report | (yellow card) 51' Çokaj; (yellow card) 82' Čeliković | Stadium: Šubićevac; Attendance: Behind closed doors Referee: Tihomir Pejin (Donji Miholjac) |

Source: Croatian Football Federation

=== UEFA Europa League ===
| 8 August 2019 QR3 | Rijeka (Croatia) | 2–0 | (Scotland) Aberdeen | Rijeka, Croatia |
| 20:00 CEST (UTC+02:00) | Kvržić (yellow card) 54'; Čolak 62' (pen.); Župarić (yellow card) 64'; Capan (yellow card) 79'; Murić 87' | Report | Logan (yellow card) 61'; Cosgrove (yellow card) 90+1' | Stadium: Rujevica; Attendance: 6,452; Referee: Ricardo de Burgos Bengoetxea (Spain) |

| 15 August 2019 QR3 | Aberdeen (Scotland) | 0–2 (0–4 agg.) | (Croatia) Rijeka | Aberdeen, Scotland |
| 19:45 BST (UTC+01:00) | Ojo (yellow card) 6' (yellow-red card) 20'; Lewis (yellow card) 20'; Cosgrove (yellow card) 27'; Campbell (yellow card) 67'; Main (yellow card) 89' | Report | Lončar 10' (yellow card) 72'; Čolak 32' | Stadium: Pittodrie; Attendance: 15,246; Referee: Harald Lechner (Austria) |

| 22 August 2019 PO | KAA Gent (Belgium) | 2–1 | (Croatia) Rijeka | Ghent, Belgium |
| 20:30 CEST (UTC+02:00) | Owusu (yellow card) 14'; Depoitre 57', 71'; Yaremchuk (yellow card) 58'; Jonathan David (yellow card) 68' | Report | Kvržić (yellow card) 33'; Halilović 39' | Stadium: Ghelamco Arena; Attendance: 12,198; Referee: Daniel Stefański (Poland) |

| 29 August 2019 PO | Rijeka (Croatia) | 1–1 (2–3 agg.) | (Belgium) KAA Gent | Rijeka, Croatia |
| 20:00 CEST (UTC+02:00) | Puljić (yellow card) 21' (goal) 32'; Capan (yellow card) 56' | Report | Plastun 33'; Kaminski (yellow card) 67'; Asare (yellow card) 88' | Stadium: Rujevica; Attendance: 7,562; Referee: François Letexier (France) |

Source: uefa.com

=== Croatian Super Cup ===
| 13 July 2019 Final | Dinamo Zagreb | 1–0 | Rijeka | Zagreb |
| 20:00 CEST (UTC+02:00) | Gavranović (yellow card) 25'; Gojak 41'; Majer (yellow card) 82' (yellow-red card) 85' | Report | Punčec (yellow card) 17'; Lepinjica (yellow card) 48'; Gorgon (yellow card) 75'; Raspopović (yellow card) 81'; Tomečak (yellow card) 90+2' | Stadium: Maksimir; Attendance: 5,075; Referee: Mario Zebec (Cestica) |

=== Friendlies ===
==== Pre-season ====
| 21 June 2019 Friendly | Rijeka (Croatia) | 3–1 | (Slovenia) Bravo | Rijeka, Croatia |
| 18:30 CEST (UTC+02:00) | Mamić 56'; Čolak 69', 83' | Report | Žagar-Knez 90+3' | Stadium: Rujevica (training ground); Attendance: Behind closed doors Referee: Antonio Melnjak |

| 29 June 2019 Friendly | Rijeka (Croatia) | 2–1 | (Slovenia) Celje | Rijeka, Croatia |
| 18:00 CEST (UTC+02:00) | Acosty 11'; Vuk 83' | Report | Štraus 55' | Stadium: Rujevica (training ground); Attendance: 200; Referee: Marko Linić (Dražice) |

| 5 July 2019 Friendly | Rijeka (Croatia) | 1–2 | (Russia) Sochi | Kranj, Slovenia |
| 17:00 CEST (UTC+02:00) | Gorgon 12' | Report | Karapetian 23'; Pesegov 38' (pen.) | Stadium: Stanko Mlakar; Attendance: Behind closed doors Referee: Andrej Žnjidaršič (Kranj) |

| 9 July 2019 Friendly | Rijeka (Croatia) | 4–1 | (Cyprus) APOEL | Kranjska Gora, Slovenia |
| 18:00 CEST (UTC+02:00) | Čolak 7'; Halilović 40'; Bušnja 53', 84' | Report | Al-Taamari 38' | Stadium: Športni park Rudeč; Attendance: Behind closed doors |

==== On-season (2019) ====
| 4 August 2019 Friendly | Rijeka | 2–1 | Orijent 1919 | Rijeka |
| | Babić; Vuk | Report | Flego | Stadium: Rujevica (training ground); Attendance: Behind closed doors |

| 7 September 2019 Friendly | Rijeka | 1–0 | Šibenik | Rijeka |
| 19:30 CEST (UTC+02:00) | Andrijašević 33' | Report | | Stadium: Rujevica; Attendance: Behind closed doors Referee: Marin Vidulin (Kanfanar) |

| 12 October 2019 Friendly | Rijeka (Croatia) | 1–1 | (Bosnia and Herzegovina) Zrinjski Mostar | Rijeka, Croatia |
| 19:00 CEST (UTC+02:00) | Župarić 16' | Report | Stojkić 40' | Stadium: Kantrida; Attendance: 7,500; Referee: Vedran Jelenčić (Kastav) |

==== Mid-season ====
| 11 January 2020 Friendly | Rijeka (Croatia) | 9–0 | (Slovenia) Šampion | Rijeka, Croatia |
| | Iglesias 4'; Puljić 11', 27', 41'; Gašper 47' (o.g.); Acosty 60'; Čolak 70', 81'; Capan 76' | Report | | Stadium: Rujevica (training ground); Attendance: Behind closed doors |

| 15 January 2020 Friendly | Rijeka (Croatia) | 1–2 | (Czech Republic) Slovácko | Umag, Croatia |
| | Gorgon 55' | Report | Dvořák 11'; Sadílek 88' | Stadium: Stella Maris Sports Center; Attendance: Behind closed doors |

| 17 January 2020 Friendly | Rijeka (Croatia) | 1–0 | (Hungary) Budafoki | Umag, Croatia |
| | Raspopović 16' | Report | | Stadium: Stella Maris Sports Center; Attendance: Behind closed doors |

| 22 January 2020 Friendly | Rijeka (Croatia) | 7–0 | (Slovenia) Triglav Kranj | Umag, Croatia |
| | Čolak 13', 20', 35'; Murić 15'; Iglesias 50'; Acosty 65'; Puljić 83' | Report | | Stadium: Stella Maris Sports Center; Attendance: Behind closed doors |

| 25 January 2020 Friendly | Rijeka (Croatia) | 4–2 | (Slovenia) Olimpija Ljubljana | Rijeka, Croatia |
| 15:00 CET (UTC+01:00) | Velkovski 10'; Andrijašević 65'; Čolak 67', 87' | Report | Vukušić 15'; Lupeta 90' | Stadium: Rujevica; Attendance: 1,000; Referee: Mario Zebec (Cestica) |

==== On-season (2020) ====
| 19 May 2020 Friendly | Rijeka | 4–1 | Inter Zaprešić | Rijeka |
| | Yatéké 13'; Lončar 32'; Čolak 47', 69' | Report | Tsonev 54' | Stadium: Rujevica; Attendance: Behind closed doors Referee: Ivan Bebek (Rijeka) |

| 24 May 2020 Friendly | Rijeka | 5–1 | Istra 1961 | Rijeka |
| | Andrijašević 5'; Čolak 11'; Lončar 64'; Murić 80'; Galović 98' | Report | Fintić 15' | Stadium: Rujevica; Attendance: Behind closed doors Referee: Ivan Bebek (Rijeka) |

== Player seasonal records ==
Updated 1 August 2020. Competitive matches only.

=== Goals ===
| Rank | Name | League | Europe | Cup | Supercup | Total |
|---|---|---|---|---|---|---|
| 1 | (Croatia) Antonio Čolak | 20 | 2 | 4 | – | 26 |
| 2 | (Croatia) Robert Murić | 6 | 1 | 3 | – | 10 |
| 3 | (Austria) Alexander Gorgon | 7 | – | 1 | – | 8 |
| 4 | (Bosnia and Herzegovina) Stjepan Lončar | 4 | 1 | 1 | – | 6 |
| 5 | (Croatia) Franko Andrijašević | 5 | – | – | – | 5 |
| 6 | (Croatia) Tibor Halilović | 2 | 1 | 1 | – | 4 |
| 7 | (Ghana) Maxwell Acosty | 3 | – | – | – | 3 |
| 8 | (Croatia) Nino Galović | 2 | – | – | – | 2 |
| 8 | (Croatia) Ivan Tomečak | 2 | – | – | – | 2 |
| 8 | (Central African Republic) Sterling Yatéké | 1 | – | 1 | – | 2 |
| 8 | (Croatia) Petar Mamić | – | – | 2 | – | 2 |
| 8 | (Croatia) Roberto Punčec | – | – | 2 | – | 2 |
| 13 | (Portugal) João Escoval | 1 | – | – | – | 1 |
| 13 | (Croatia) Ivan Lepinjica | 1 | – | – | – | 1 |
| 13 | (Brazil) Felipe Pires | 1 | – | – | – | 1 |
| 13 | (Montenegro) Momčilo Raspopović | 1 | – | – | – | 1 |
| 13 | (Croatia) Dario Župarić | 1 | – | – | – | 1 |
| 13 | (Croatia) Jakov Puljić | – | 1 | – | – | 1 |
| 13 | (Croatia) Domagoj Pavičić | – | – | 1 | – | 1 |
| 13 | (Croatia) Hrvoje Smolčić | – | – | 1 | – | 1 |
| 13 | (Croatia) Matej Vuk | – | – | 1 | – | 1 |
| Own goals | | 1 | – | – | – | 1 |
| TOTALS | | 58 | 6 | 18 | 0 | 82 |

Source: Competitive matches

=== Clean sheets ===
| Rank | Name | League | Europe | Cup | Supercup | Total |
|---|---|---|---|---|---|---|
| 1 | (Croatia) Ivor Pandur | 7 | – | 3 | – | 10 |
| 2 | (Croatia) Andrej Prskalo | 5 | 2 | – | – | 7 |
| TOTALS | | 12 | 2 | 3 | 0 | 17 |

Source: Competitive matches

=== Disciplinary record ===
| Number | Position | Player | 1. HNL | | | Europe | | | Croatian Cup | | | Supercup | | | Total | | |
|---|---|---|---|---|---|---|---|---|---|---|---|---|---|---|---|---|---|
| Number | Position | Player | Booked | (yellow card) (yellow-red card) | Sent off (straight red) | Booked | (yellow card) (yellow-red card) | Sent off (straight red) | Booked | (yellow card) (yellow-red card) | Sent off (straight red) | Booked | (yellow card) (yellow-red card) | Sent off (straight red) | Booked | (yellow card) (yellow-red card) | Sent off (straight red) |
| 2 | DF | (Croatia) Filip Braut | 2 | 0 | 0 | 0 | 0 | 0 | 0 | 0 | 0 | 0 | 0 | 0 | 2 | 0 | 0 |
| 3 | DF | (Croatia) Petar Mamić | 1 | 0 | 0 | 0 | 0 | 0 | 0 | 0 | 0 | 0 | 0 | 0 | 1 | 0 | 0 |
| 4 | DF | (Croatia) Nino Galović | 1 | 1 | 0 | 0 | 0 | 0 | 0 | 0 | 0 | 0 | 0 | 0 | 1 | 1 | 0 |
| 4 | DF | (Croatia) Roberto Punčec | 3 | 0 | 0 | 0 | 0 | 0 | 1 | 0 | 0 | 1 | 0 | 0 | 5 | 0 | 0 |
| 6 | MF | (Croatia) Ivan Lepinjica | 11 | 0 | 0 | 0 | 0 | 0 | 3 | 0 | 0 | 1 | 0 | 0 | 15 | 0 | 0 |
| 7 | MF | (Bosnia and Herzegovina) Zoran Kvržić | 1 | 0 | 0 | 2 | 0 | 0 | 0 | 0 | 0 | 0 | 0 | 0 | 3 | 0 | 0 |
| 8 | MF | (Croatia) Tibor Halilović | 9 | 0 | 0 | 0 | 0 | 0 | 1 | 0 | 0 | 0 | 0 | 0 | 10 | 0 | 0 |
| 10 | MF | (Croatia) Domagoj Pavičić | 3 | 0 | 0 | 0 | 0 | 0 | 0 | 0 | 0 | 0 | 0 | 0 | 3 | 0 | 0 |
| 13 | DF | (Croatia) Dario Župarić | 1 | 0 | 0 | 1 | 0 | 0 | 1 | 0 | 0 | 0 | 0 | 0 | 3 | 0 | 0 |
| 14 | FW | (Ghana) Maxwell Acosty | 2 | 0 | 0 | 0 | 0 | 0 | 1 | 0 | 0 | 0 | 0 | 0 | 3 | 0 | 0 |
| 14 | DF | (North Macedonia) Darko Velkovski | 3 | 0 | 0 | 0 | 0 | 0 | 2 | 0 | 0 | 0 | 0 | 0 | 5 | 0 | 0 |
| 17 | FW | (Croatia) Antonio Čolak | 4 | 0 | 0 | 0 | 0 | 0 | 1 | 0 | 0 | 0 | 0 | 0 | 5 | 0 | 0 |
| 18 | MF | (Croatia) Robert Murić | 3 | 0 | 0 | 0 | 0 | 0 | 0 | 0 | 0 | 0 | 0 | 0 | 3 | 0 | 0 |
| 19 | MF | (Croatia) Franko Andrijašević | 5 | 0 | 0 | 0 | 0 | 0 | 0 | 0 | 0 | 0 | 0 | 0 | 5 | 0 | 0 |
| 20 | FW | (Austria) Alexander Gorgon | 3 | 0 | 0 | 0 | 0 | 0 | 0 | 0 | 0 | 1 | 0 | 0 | 4 | 0 | 0 |
| 21 | FW | (Croatia) Jakov Puljić | 0 | 0 | 0 | 1 | 0 | 0 | 1 | 0 | 0 | 0 | 0 | 0 | 2 | 0 | 0 |
| 26 | DF | (Portugal) João Escoval | 4 | 0 | 0 | 0 | 0 | 0 | 2 | 0 | 0 | 0 | 0 | 0 | 6 | 0 | 0 |
| 27 | DF | (Croatia) Ivan Tomečak | 1 | 0 | 0 | 0 | 0 | 0 | 0 | 0 | 0 | 1 | 0 | 0 | 2 | 0 | 0 |
| 29 | DF | (Montenegro) Momčilo Raspopović | 1 | 0 | 0 | 0 | 0 | 0 | 0 | 0 | 0 | 1 | 0 | 0 | 2 | 0 | 0 |
| 30 | MF | (Spain) Dani Iglesias | 1 | 0 | 0 | 0 | 0 | 0 | 0 | 0 | 0 | 0 | 0 | 0 | 1 | 0 | 0 |
| 31 | MF | (Croatia) Luka Capan | 5 | 1 | 0 | 2 | 0 | 0 | 1 | 0 | 0 | 0 | 0 | 0 | 8 | 1 | 0 |
| 32 | GK | (Croatia) Andrej Prskalo | 1 | 0 | 0 | 0 | 0 | 0 | 0 | 0 | 0 | 0 | 0 | 0 | 1 | 0 | 0 |
| 36 | DF | (Croatia) Hrvoje Smolčić | 3 | 1 | 0 | 0 | 0 | 0 | 1 | 1 | 0 | 0 | 0 | 0 | 4 | 2 | 0 |
| 40 | DF | (Bosnia and Herzegovina) Jasmin Čeliković | 1 | 0 | 0 | 0 | 0 | 0 | 0 | 0 | 0 | 0 | 0 | 0 | 1 | 0 | 0 |
| 44 | MF | (Bosnia and Herzegovina) Stjepan Lončar | 3 | 0 | 0 | 1 | 0 | 0 | 0 | 0 | 0 | 0 | 0 | 0 | 4 | 0 | 0 |
| TOTALS | | | 72 | 3 | 0 | 7 | 0 | 0 | 15 | 1 | 0 | 5 | 0 | 0 | 99 | 4 | 0 |

Source: nk-rijeka.hr

=== Appearances and goals ===
| Number | Position | Player | Apps | Goals | Apps | Goals | Apps | Goals | Apps | Goals | Apps | Goals |
| Number | Position | Player | Total | | 1. HNL (Note: First number represents appearances in starting eleven, while the second number indicates a substitute appearance.) | | Europa League | | Croatian Cup | | Supercup | |
|---|---|---|---|---|---|---|---|---|---|---|---|---|
| 2 | DF | (Croatia) Filip Braut | 10 | 0 | 6+3 | 0 | 0+0 | 0 | 1+0 | 0 | 0+0 | 0 |
| 3 | DF | (Croatia) Niko Galešić | 1 | 0 | 0+1 | 0 | 0+0 | 0 | 0+0 | 0 | 0+0 | 0 |
| 3 | DF | (Croatia) Petar Mamić | 3 | 2 | 1+0 | 0 | 0+0 | 0 | 2+0 | 2 | 0+0 | 0 |
| 4 | DF | (Croatia) Nino Galović | 12 | 2 | 9+1 | 2 | 0+0 | 0 | 2+0 | 0 | 0+0 | 0 |
| 4 | DF | (Croatia) Roberto Punčec | 16 | 2 | 9+0 | 0 | 4+0 | 0 | 2+0 | 2 | 1+0 | 0 |
| 6 | MF | (Croatia) Ivan Lepinjica | 37 | 1 | 21+6 | 1 | 4+0 | 0 | 4+1 | 0 | 1+0 | 0 |
| 7 | MF | (Bosnia and Herzegovina) Zoran Kvržić | 16 | 0 | 10+1 | 0 | 3+0 | 0 | 1+0 | 0 | 1+0 | 0 |
| 8 | MF | (Croatia) Tibor Halilović | 37 | 4 | 27+1 | 2 | 4+0 | 1 | 4+0 | 1 | 0+1 | 0 |
| 9 | FW | (Croatia) Matko Babić | 4 | 0 | 0+2 | 0 | 0+0 | 0 | 0+2 | 0 | 0+0 | 0 |
| 10 | MF | (Croatia) Domagoj Pavičić | 27 | 1 | 12+12 | 0 | 0+0 | 0 | 2+0 | 1 | 0+1 | 0 |
| 11 | MF | (Croatia) Matej Vuk | 4 | 1 | 1+1 | 0 | 0+1 | 0 | 1+0 | 1 | 0+0 | 0 |
| 11 | FW | (Central African Republic) Sterling Yatéké | 11 | 2 | 2+8 | 1 | 0+0 | 0 | 0+1 | 1 | 0+0 | 0 |
| 12 | GK | (Croatia) Simon Sluga | 1 | 0 | 0+0 | 0 | 0+0 | 0 | 0+0 | 0 | 1+0 | 0 |
| 13 | DF | (Croatia) Dario Župarić | 23 | 1 | 17+0 | 1 | 4+0 | 0 | 1+0 | 0 | 1+0 | 0 |
| 14 | MF | (Ghana) Maxwell Acosty | 22 | 3 | 9+8 | 3 | 4+0 | 0 | 0+1 | 0 | 0+0 | 0 |
| 14 | DF | (North Macedonia) Darko Velkovski | 22 | 0 | 17+1 | 0 | 0+1 | 0 | 3+0 | 0 | 0+0 | 0 |
| 17 | FW | (Croatia) Antonio Čolak | 41 | 26 | 27+5 | 20 | 4+0 | 2 | 4+0 | 4 | 1+0 | 0 |
| 18 | MF | (Croatia) Robert Murić | 31 | 10 | 13+11 | 6 | 0+3 | 1 | 2+1 | 3 | 0+1 | 0 |
| 19 | MF | (Croatia) Franko Andrijašević | 29 | 5 | 25+1 | 5 | 0+0 | 0 | 3+0 | 0 | 0+0 | 0 |
| 20 | MF | (Austria) Alexander Gorgon | 30 | 8 | 20+6 | 7 | 0+1 | 0 | 2+0 | 1 | 1+0 | 0 |
| 21 | FW | (Croatia) Jakov Puljić | 11 | 1 | 5+3 | 0 | 0+2 | 1 | 1+0 | 0 | 0+0 | 0 |
| 22 | MF | (Croatia) Denis Bušnja | 3 | 0 | 1+2 | 0 | 0+0 | 0 | 0+0 | 0 | 0+0 | 0 |
| 24 | DF | (Croatia) Daniel Štefulj | 12 | 0 | 9+0 | 0 | 0+0 | 0 | 3+0 | 0 | 0+0 | 0 |
| 25 | GK | (Croatia) Ivor Pandur | 22 | 0 | 18+0 | 0 | 0+0 | 0 | 4+0 | 0 | 0+0 | 0 |
| 26 | DF | (Portugal) João Escoval | 31 | 1 | 24+3 | 1 | 0+0 | 0 | 2+1 | 0 | 1+0 | 0 |
| 27 | DF | (Croatia) Ivan Tomečak | 29 | 2 | 20+3 | 2 | 2+0 | 0 | 2+1 | 0 | 1+0 | 0 |
| 29 | DF | (Montenegro) Momčilo Raspopović | 26 | 1 | 13+7 | 1 | 3+1 | 0 | 0+1 | 0 | 1+0 | 0 |
| 30 | MF | (Spain) Dani Iglesias | 14 | 0 | 3+6 | 0 | 0+3 | 0 | 1+1 | 0 | 0+0 | 0 |
| 31 | MF | (Croatia) Luka Capan | 29 | 0 | 12+8 | 0 | 4+0 | 0 | 2+2 | 0 | 1+0 | 0 |
| 32 | GK | (Croatia) Andrej Prskalo | 23 | 0 | 18+0 | 0 | 4+0 | 0 | 1+0 | 0 | 0+0 | 0 |
| 36 | DF | (Croatia) Hrvoje Smolčić | 27 | 1 | 23+1 | 0 | 0+0 | 0 | 3+0 | 1 | 0+0 | 0 |
| 40 | DF | (Bosnia and Herzegovina) Jasmin Čeliković | 2 | 0 | 0+2 | 0 | 0+0 | 0 | 0+0 | 0 | 0+0 | 0 |
| 44 | MF | (Bosnia and Herzegovina) Stjepan Lončar | 40 | 6 | 24+7 | 4 | 4+0 | 1 | 3+2 | 1 | 0+0 | 0 |
| 95 | FW | (Brazil) Felipe Pires | 5 | 1 | 0+5 | 1 | 0+0 | 0 | 0+0 | 0 | 0+0 | 0 |

Source: nk-rijeka.hr

=== Suspensions ===
| Date Incurred | Competition | Player | Games Missed | Reason |
|---|---|---|---|---|
| 11 Aug 2019 | 1. HNL | (Croatia) Ivan Lepinjica | 1 | Booked |
| 1 Sep 2019 | 1. HNL | (Croatia) Roberto Punčec | 1 | Booked |
| 28 Sep 2019 | 1. HNL | (Croatia) Robert Murić | 1 | Booked |
| 6 Oct 2019 | 1. HNL | (Croatia) Tibor Halilović | 1 | Booked |
| 26 Oct 2019 | 1. HNL | (Croatia) Hrvoje Smolčić | 1 | (yellow card) (yellow-red card) |
| 10 Nov 2019 | 1. HNL | (Croatia) Ivan Lepinjica | 1 | Booked |
| 1 Dec 2019 | 1. HNL | (Croatia) Franko Andrijašević | 1 | Booked |
| 16 Feb 2020 | 1. HNL | (Portugal) João Escoval | 1 | Booked |
| 16 Feb 2020 | 1. HNL | (Croatia) Antonio Čolak | 1 | Booked |
| 22 Feb 2020 | 1. HNL | (Croatia) Ivan Lepinjica | 1 | Booked |
| 29 Feb 2020 | 1. HNL | (Croatia) Luka Capan | 1 | Booked |
| 31 May 2020 | Cup | (Croatia) Hrvoje Smolčić | 1 | (yellow card) (yellow-red card) |
| 16 Jun 2020 | 1. HNL | (Croatia) Hrvoje Smolčić | 1 | Booked |
| 16 Jun 2020 | 1. HNL | (Croatia) Luka Capan | 1 | (yellow card) (yellow-red card) |
| 21 Jun 2020 | 1. HNL | (Austria) Alexander Gorgon | 1 | Booked |
| 21 Jun 2020 | 1. HNL | (Croatia) Tibor Halilović | 1 | Booked |
| 26 Jun 2020 | 1. HNL | (Bosnia and Herzegovina) Stjepan Lončar | 1 | Booked |
| 1 Jul 2020 | 1. HNL | (Croatia) Nino Galović | 1 | (yellow card) (yellow-red card) |
| 11 Jul 2020 | 1. HNL | (Croatia) Domagoj Pavičić | 1 | Booked |
| 19 Jul 2020 | 1. HNL | (Croatia) Tibor Halilović | 1 | Booked |
| 25 Jul 2020 | 1. HNL | (North Macedonia) Darko Velkovski | 1 | Booked |

=== Penalties ===
For
| Date | Competition | Player | Opposition | Scored? |
|---|---|---|---|---|
| 8 Aug 2019 | UEL | (Croatia) Antonio Čolak | Aberdeen | ✓ |
| 8 Mar 2020 | 1. HNL | (Austria) Alexander Gorgon | Hajduk Split | ✓ |
| 31 May 2020 | Cup | (Croatia) Antonio Čolak | Osijek | ✓ |
| 11 Jul 2020 | 1. HNL | (Croatia) Antonio Čolak | Inter Zaprešić | ✓ |
| 25 Jul 2020 | 1. HNL | (Croatia) Antonio Čolak | Istra 1961 | ✓ |
Against
| Date | Competition | Goalkeeper | Opposition | Scored? |
| 1 Sep 2019 | 1. HNL | (Croatia) Andrej Prskalo | Inter Zaprešić | ✓ |
| 14 Dec 2019 | 1. HNL | (Croatia) Ivor Pandur | Varaždin | ✓ |
| 18 Dec 2019 | 1. HNL | (Croatia) Andrej Prskalo | Dinamo Zagreb | ✓ |
| 16 Jun 2020 | 1. HNL | (Croatia) Ivor Pandur | Lokomotiva | ✓ |
| 26 Jun 2020 | 1. HNL | (Croatia) Ivor Pandur | Gorica | ✓ |
| 19 Jul 2020 | 1. HNL | (Croatia) Ivor Pandur | Hajduk Split | ✓ |
| 25 Jul 2020 | 1. HNL | (Croatia) Ivor Pandur | Istra 1961 | ✓ |

=== Overview of statistics ===
| Statistic | Overall | 1. HNL | Croatian Cup | Europa League |
|---|---|---|---|---|
| Most appearances | Čolak (41) | Čolak (32) | Lepinjica & Lončar (5) | 10 players (4) |
| Most starts | Čolak (36) | Čolak & Halilović (27) | Čolak, Halilović, Lepinjica & Pandur (4) | 9 players (4) |
| Most substitute appearances | Murić (16) | Pavičić (12) | Babić, Capan & Lončar (2) | Iglesias & Murić (3) |
| Most minutes played | Čolak (3,125) | Čolak (2,510) | Lepinjica (386) | 4 players (360) |
| Top goalscorer | Čolak (26) | Čolak (20) | Čolak (4) | Čolak (2) |
| Most assists | Andrijašević (8) | Andrijašević (8) | Murić & Štefulj (2) | Acosty (3) |
| Most yellow cards | Lepinjica (15) | Lepinjica (11) | Lepinjica (3) | Capan & Kvržić (2) |
| Most red cards | Smolčić (2) | Capan, Galović & Smolčić (1) | Smolčić (1) | – |
Last updated: 28 June 2021.

== Transfers ==
=== In ===
| Date | Pos. | Player | Moving from | Type | Fee | Ref. |
|---|---|---|---|---|---|---|
| 14 Jun 2019 | CF | (Croatia) Emanuel Črnko | (Croatia) Varaždin | Return from loan | —N/a | |
| 15 Jun 2019 | CB | (Bosnia and Herzegovina) Jasmin Čeliković | (Croatia) Inter Zaprešić | Return from loan | —N/a | |
| 15 Jun 2019 | GK | (Croatia) Ivan Nevistić | (Croatia) Varaždin | Return from loan | —N/a | |
| 15 Jun 2019 | LB | (Croatia) Daniel Štefulj | (Slovenia) Krško | Return from loan | —N/a | |
| 15 Jun 2019 | RW | (Croatia) Tomislav Turčin | (Bosnia and Herzegovina) Široki Brijeg | Return from loan | —N/a | |
| 28 Jun 2019 | CF | (Croatia) Matko Babić | (Croatia) Lokomotiva | Transfer | Free | |
| 30 Jun 2019 | GK | (Nigeria) David Nwolokor | (Slovakia) Sereď | Return from loan | —N/a | |
| 5 Jul 2019 | CF | (Croatia) Antonio Čolak | (Germany) 1899 Hoffenheim | Transfer (buying option) | €850,000 | |
| 26 Jul 2019 | AM | (Spain) Dani Iglesias | (Spain) Deportivo Alavés | Transfer | Free | |
| 12 Aug 2019 | CB | (Croatia) Lorenco Šimić | (Italy) Sampdoria | Loan (until 30/6/2020; option to buy) | —N/a | |
| 6 Sep 2019 | AM | (Croatia) Franko Andrijašević | (Belgium) Gent | Loan (until 30/6/2021) | —N/a | |
| 30 Jun 2020 | RW | (Croatia) Tomislav Turčin | (Croatia) Varaždin | Return from loan | —N/a | |
| 30 Jun 2020 | CF | (Croatia) Matko Babić | (Czech Republic) Karviná | Return from loan | —N/a | |
| 15 Jul 2020 | RM | (Austria) Mario Pavelić | (Austria) Admira Wacker | Return from loan | —N/a | |
| 15 Jul 2020 | CF | (North Macedonia) Milan Ristovski | (Slovakia) Nitra | Return from loan | —N/a | |
| 20 Jul 2020 | LW | (Croatia) Matej Vuk | (Slovakia) Sereď | Return from loan | —N/a | |
| 20 Jan 2020 | LB | (Croatia) Daniel Štefulj | (Croatia) Varaždin | Return from loan | —N/a | |
| 24 Jan 2020 | RB | (Austria) Mario Pavelić | (Norway) Sarpsborg 08 | Return from loan | —N/a | |
| 28 Jan 2020 | CB | (Bosnia and Herzegovina) Jasmin Čeliković | (Bosnia and Herzegovina) Zrinjski Mostar | Return from loan | —N/a | |
| 28 Jan 2020 | CB | (Croatia) Nino Galović | (Japan) Sagan Tosu | Transfer | Free | |
| 14 Feb 2020 | LW | (Brazil) Felipe Pires | (Germany) 1899 Hoffenheim | Loan (until 30/6/2020; option to buy) | —N/a | |
| 18 Feb 2020 | CF | (Central African Republic) Sterling Yatéké | Austria Wien | Loan (until 30/6/2021; option to buy) | —N/a | |

Source: Glasilo Hrvatskog nogometnog saveza

=== Out ===
| Date | Pos. | Player | Moving to | Type | Fee | Ref. |
|---|---|---|---|---|---|---|
| 30 Jun 2019 | CF | (Croatia) Antonio Čolak | (Germany) 1899 Hoffenheim | End of loan | —N/a | |
| 1 Jul 2019 | CB | (Bosnia and Herzegovina) Jasmin Čeliković | (Bosnia and Herzegovina) Zrinjski Mostar | Loan (until 15/6/2020) | —N/a | |
| 15 Jul 2019 | GK | (Croatia) Ivan Nevistić | (Croatia) Varaždin | Loan (until 15/6/2020) | —N/a | |
| 15 Jul 2019 | RW | (Croatia) Josip Mitrović | (Croatia) Inter Zaprešić | Loan (until 14/6/2020) | —N/a | |
| 15 Jul 2019 | RW | (Croatia) Tomislav Turčin | (Croatia) Varaždin | Loan (until 15/6/2020) | —N/a | |
| 17 Jul 2019 | CF | (North Macedonia) Milan Ristovski | (Slovakia) Nitra | Loan (until 15/6/2020) | —N/a | |
| 22 Jul 2019 | GK | (Croatia) Simon Sluga | (England) Luton Town | Transfer | €1,700,000 | |
| 1 Aug 2019 | RB | (Austria) Mario Pavelić | (Norway) Sarpsborg 08 | Loan (until 18/1/2020) | —N/a | |
| 2 Aug 2019 | CF | (Croatia) Emanuel Črnko | (Croatia) Orijent 1919 | End of contract | Free | |
| 6 Aug 2019 | LB | (Croatia) Daniel Štefulj | (Croatia) Varaždin | Loan (until 14/6/2020) | —N/a | |
| 9 Aug 2019 | CM | (Croatia) Adrian Liber | (Croatia) Orijent 1919 | Loan (until 14/6/2020) | —N/a | |
| 9 Aug 2019 | CB | (Croatia) Ivan Smolčić | (Croatia) Orijent 1919 | Loan (until 15/6/2021) | —N/a | |
| 1 Sep 2019 | AM | (Croatia) Denis Bušnja | (Croatia) Istra 1961 | Loan (until 15/6/2020) | —N/a | |
| 19 Sep 2019 | DM | (Nigeria) Gerald Diyoke | (Slovenia) Brežice 1919 | End of contract | Free | |
| 30 Jun 2020 | LW | (Brazil) Felipe Pires | (Germany) Hoffenheim | End of loan | —N/a | |
| 28 Jul 2020 | CF | (Croatia) Matko Babić | (Cyprus) AEL Limassol | Transfer | Free | |
| 15 Jan 2020 | RW | (Bosnia and Herzegovina) Zoran Kvržić | (Turkey) Kayserispor | Transfer | €400,000 | |
| 4 Feb 2020 | SS | (Croatia) Jakov Puljić | (Poland) Jagiellonia Białystok | Transfer | €500,000 | |
| 5 Feb 2020 | CB | (Croatia) Lorenco Šimić | (Italy) Sampdoria | End of loan | —N/a | |
| 7 Feb 2020 | RB | (Austria) Mario Pavelić | (Austria) Admira Wacker | Loan (until 15/6/2020) | —N/a | |
| 10 Feb 2020 | LB | (Croatia) Petar Mamić | (Croatia) Varaždin | Loan (until 15/6/2020) | —N/a | |
| 11 Feb 2020 | LW | (Croatia) Matej Vuk | (Slovakia) Sereď | Loan (until 15/6/2020) | —N/a | |
| 13 Feb 2020 | CB | (Croatia) Roberto Punčec | (United States) Sporting Kansas City | Released (mutual consent) | Free | |
| 20 Feb 2020 | CF | (Croatia) Matko Babić | (Czech Republic) Karviná | Loan (until 15/6/2020) | —N/a | |
| 20 Feb 2020 | CB | (Croatia) Dario Župarić | (United States) Portland Timbers | Transfer | €800,000 | |
| 26 Feb 2020 | LW | (Ghana) Maxwell Acosty | (South Korea) Anyang | Transfer | €500,000 | |

Source: Glasilo Hrvatskog nogometnog saveza

Spending: ▼€850,000
Income: ▲€3,900,000
Expenditure: ▲€3,050,000
