= 2019 Croatian Football Super Cup =

Dinamo Zagreb	Rijeka
1	0
- Date: 13 July 2019
- Venue: Stadion Maksimir, Zagreb
- Referee: Mario Zebec (Cestica)
- Attendance: 5,075

The 2019 Croatian Football Super Cup was the twelfth edition of Croatian Football Super Cup, a football match contested by the winners of the Croatian First League and Croatian Football Cup. The match was played on 13 July 2019 at Stadion Maksimir in Zagreb between 2018–19 Croatian First League winners Dinamo Zagreb and 2018–19 Croatian Football Cup winners Rijeka.

== Match details ==
13 July 2019
20:00

Dinamo Zagreb	1–0	Rijeka
Gojak 41'	Report

Stadion Maksimir, Zagreb
Attendance: 5,075
Referee: Mario Zebec (Cestica)

Dinamo Zagreb	Rijeka

GK	40	(Croatia) Dominik Livaković
RB	30	(Slovenia) Petar Stojanović
CB	31	(Croatia) Marko Lešković
CB	55	(Croatia) Dino Perić
LB	22	(Croatia) Marin Leovac
CM	5	(North Macedonia) Arijan Ademi (c)
AM	14	(Bosnia and Herzegovina) Amer Gojak
AM	92	(Poland) Damian Kądzior
RF	8	(Bosnia and Herzegovina) Izet Hajrović		(substituted off) 82'
CF	11	(Switzerland) Mario Gavranović	(yellow card) 25'	(substituted off) 65'
LF	99	(Croatia) Mislav Oršić		(substituted off) 90+2'
Substitutes:
GK	1	(Croatia) Danijel Zagorac
DF	32	(Croatia) Joško Gvardiol
MF	20	(Nigeria) Iyayi Atiemwen
MF	27	(Croatia) Nikola Moro		(substituted on) 90+2'
MF	10	(Croatia) Lovro Majer	(yellow card) 83' (yellow-red card) 85'	(substituted on) 82'
FW	21	(Croatia) Bruno Petković		(substituted on) 65'
FW	16	(Croatia) Mario Šitum
Manager:
(Croatia) Nenad Bjelica

GK	12	(Croatia) Simon Sluga
CB	26	(Portugal) João Escoval		(substituted off) 63'
CB	13	(Croatia) Dario Župarić
CB	4	(Croatia) Roberto Punčec	(yellow card) 17'
CM	29	(Montenegro) Momčilo Raspopović	(yellow card) 81'
CM	31	(Croatia) Luka Capan		(substituted off) 72'
CM	6	(Croatia) Ivan Lepinjica	(yellow card) 48'	(substituted off) 85'
CM	14	(Croatia) Ivan Tomečak	(yellow card) 90+1'
RF	7	(Bosnia and Herzegovina) Zoran Kvržić
CF	17	(Croatia) Antonio Čolak
LF	20	(Austria) Alexander Gorgon (c)	(yellow card) 74'
Substitutes:
GK	32	(Croatia) Andrej Prskalo
DF	5	(North Macedonia) Darko Velkovski
MF	14	(Ghana) Boadu Maxwell Acosty
MF	22	(Croatia) Denis Bušnja
MF	10	(Croatia) Domagoj Pavičić		(substituted on) 63'
MF	8	(Croatia) Tibor Halilović		(substituted on) 72'
FW	18	(Croatia) Robert Murić		(substituted on) 85'
Manager:
(Croatia) Igor Bišćan

Assistant referees:
Goran Pataki (Đakovo)
Vedran Đurak (Sisak)
Fourth official:
Marko Matoc (Zaprešić)
Additional assistant referees:

Match rules

- 90 minutes.
- 30 minutes of extra-time if necessary.
- Penalty shoot-out if scores still level.
- Seven named substitutes.
- Maximum of three substitutions.
