= Jasmin Čeliković =

Bosnian football defender (born 1999)

Personal information
- Date of birth: 7 January 1999 (age 27)
- Place of birth: Bihać, Bosnia and Herzegovina
- Height: 1.89 m (6 ft 2 in)
- Position: Centre back

Team information
- Current team: Sloga Doboj
- Number: 17

Youth career
- 2010–2012: Vrapče
- 2012–2015: Zagreb
- 2015–2016: Rijeka

Senior career*
Years	Team	Apps	(Gls)
2016–2021	Rijeka	4	(0)
2018–2019	→ Inter Zaprešić (loan)	22	(0)
2019	→ Zrinjski Mostar (loan)	1	(0)
2020	→ Sereď (loan)	8	(0)
2021	→ Željezničar (loan)	13	(0)
2021–2024	Tuzla City	57	(5)
2023–2024	→ Akhmat Grozny (loan)	22	(0)
2024–2025	Akhmat Grozny	0	(0)
2024–2025	→ Panetolikos (loan)	1	(0)
2025	Koper	2	(0)
2025–2026	Vllaznia Shkodër	19	(0)
2026–	Sloga Doboj	3	(0)

International career
2015–2016	Bosnia and Herzegovina U17	14	(0)
2016–2018	Bosnia and Herzegovina U19	15	(1)
2018–2019	Bosnia and Herzegovina U21	4	(0)
- * Club domestic league appearances and goals as of 20 September 2026

Jasmin Čeliković (Bosnian pronunciation: [jǎsmiːn tʃělikoʋitɕ]; born 7 January 1999) is a Bosnian professional footballer who plays as a centre back for Bosnian Premier League club Sloga Doboj.

Čeliković started his professional career at Rijeka, who loaned him to Inter Zaprešić in 2018 and to Zrinjski Mostar in 2019. The club later loaned him to Sereď and Željezničar.

== Club career ==
Čeliković started playing football at local clubs, before joining Rijeka's youth academy in 2015. He made his professional debut against Split on 11 December 2016 at the age of 17.

In June 2018, Čeliković was sent on a season-long loan to Inter Zaprešić.

In June 2019, he was loaned to Bosnian side Zrinjski Mostar until the end of season. After Zrinjski, Čeliković was loaned out to Fortuna Liga club ŠKF Sereď. In January 2021, he was sent on a six-month-long loan to Bosnian club Željezničar.

On 10 July 2023, Čeliković joined Russian Premier League club Akhmat Grozny on a season-long loan with an option to buy.

In July 2024, Čeliković joined Super League Greece club Panetolikos on a season-long loan deal after Akhmat Grozny activated their option to buy. On 21 June 2025, his contract with Akhmat was terminated by mutual consent.

On 1 July 2025, Čeliković signed a contract with Koper in Slovenia until the end of 2026.

== International career ==
Čeliković represented Bosnia and Herzegovina on all youth levels. He also served as captain of country's all youth selections.

== Career statistics ==
=== Club ===
As of match played 20 September 2026

Appearances and goals by club, season and competition
Club	Season	League			National cup (Note: Includes Croatian Cup, Bosnian Cup, Slovak Cup, Russian Cup, Albanian Cup)		Continental		Total	
Club	Season	Division	Apps	Goals	Apps	Goals	Apps	Goals	Apps	Goals
Rijeka	2016–17	1. HNL	1	0	0	0	–		1	0
Rijeka	2017–18	1. HNL	1	0	0	0	0	0	1	0
Rijeka	2019–20	1. HNL	2	0	0	0	–		2	0
Rijeka	Total		4	0	0	0	0	0	4	0
Inter Zaprešić (loan)	2018–19	1. HNL	22	0	2	0	–		24	0
Zrinjski Mostar (loan)	2019–20	Bosnian Premier League	1	0	2	0	0	0	3	0
Sereď (loan)	2020–21	Slovak Super Liga	8	0	1	1	–		9	1
Željezničar (loan)	2020–21	Bosnian Premier League	13	0	1	0	–		14	0
Tuzla City	2021–22	Bosnian Premier League	28	2	4	0	–		32	2
Tuzla City	2022–23	Bosnian Premier League	29	3	4	0	4 (Note: Appearances in UEFA Europa Conference League)	1	37	4
Tuzla City	Total		57	5	8	0	4	1	69	6
Akhmat Grozny (loan)	2023–24	Russian Premier League	22	0	7	1	–		29	1
Panetolikos (loan)	2024–25	Super League Greece	1	0	–		–		1	0
Koper	2025–26	Slovenian PrvaLiga	2	0	–		3	0	5	0
Vllaznia	2025–26	Kategoria Superiore	18	0	5	0	–		23	0
Vllaznia	2026–27	Kategoria Superiore	1	0	–		2	0	3	0
Vllaznia	Total		19	0	5	0	2	0	26	0
Sloga Doboj	2026–27	Bosnian Premier League	3	0	0	0	–		3	0
Career total			152	5	26	2	9	1	187	8

== Honours ==
Rijeka

- 1. HNL: 2016–17
- Croatian Cup: 2019–20
