= Darko Velkovski =

Macedonian footballer

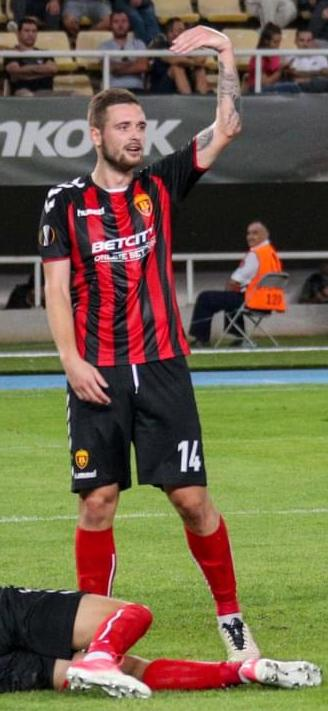
- Velkovski with Vardar in 2017

Personal information
- Full name: Darko Velkovski
- Date of birth: 21 June 1995 (age 31)
- Place of birth: Skopje, Macedonia
- Height: 1.88 m (6 ft 2 in)
- Position: Centre-back

Team information
- Current team: Vardar
- Number: 14

Youth career
- –2011: Makedonija Gjorche Petrov

Senior career*
Years	Team	Apps	(Gls)
2011–2015	Rabotnički	109	(11)
2015–2018	Vardar	53	(1)
2018–2022	Rijeka	62	(1)
2022–2023	Al-Ettifaq	15	(0)
2024	Dinamo Bucureşti	16	(1)
2025	Nyíregyháza Spartacus	3	(0)
2025–2026	Zrinjski Mostar	1	(0)
2026–	Vardar	16	(4)

International career^{‡}
2011–2013	Macedonia U17	9	(2)
2012–2013	Macedonia U18	1	(0)
2012–2013	Macedonia U19	10	(4)
2014	Macedonia U20	1	(0)
2013–2017	Macedonia U21	20	(2)
2014–	North Macedonia	55	(3)
- * Club domestic league appearances and goals as of 23 May 2026 ‡ National team caps and goals as of 25 March 2025

Darko Velkovski (Macedonian: Дарко Велковски; born 21 June 1995) is a Macedonian footballer who plays as a centre-back or as a defensive midfielder for Macedonian club Vardar and the North Macedonia national team.

== Club career ==
=== Dinamo București ===
On 3 January 2024, Dinamo București announced the signing of Velkovski, who prior to this was a free agent for more than 6 months. Velkovski made his debut for the team on 27 January 2024, in the 1–2 loss against Rapid București. On 12 February 2024, he scored his first goal for the club, in the 2–0 away win against champions Farul Constanța. For this performance, he was selected in the Liga I Team of the Week.

He was released by Dinamo in June 2024.

== International career ==
He made his senior debut for North Macedonia in a June 2014 friendly match against China and as of then, he has earned a total of 41 caps, scoring 3 goals.

On 8 October 2020, he scored his first national goal against Kosovo in the UEFA Euro 2020 qualifying play-offs.

=== International ===
As of match played 10 June 2024

Appearances and goals by national team and year
National team	Year	Apps	Goals
North Macedonia (Note: North Macedonia was known as Macedonia until 2019)
North Macedonia	2014	2	0
North Macedonia	2015	1	0
North Macedonia	2016	1	0
North Macedonia	2017	5	0
North Macedonia	2018	2	0
North Macedonia	2019	8	0
North Macedonia	2020	7	1
North Macedonia	2021	12	2
North Macedonia	2022	7	0
North Macedonia	2023	3	0
North Macedonia	2024	3	0
Total		51	3

As of match played 8 October 2021. North Macedonia score listed first, score column indicates score after each Velkovski goal.

International goals by date, venue, cap, opponent, score, result and competition
No.	Date	Venue	Cap	Opponent	Score	Result	Competition
1	8 October 2020	Toshe Proeski Arena, Skopje, Macedonia	22	Kosovo	2–1	2–1	UEFA Euro 2020 qualifying play-offs
2	5 September 2021	Laugardalsvöllur, Reykjavík, Iceland	33	Iceland	1–0	2–2	2022 FIFA World Cup qualification
3	8 October 2021	Rheinpark Stadion, Vaduz, Liechtenstein	35	Liechtenstein	1–0	4–0	2022 FIFA World Cup qualification

== Honours ==
Rabotnički

- 1. MFL: 2013–14
- Macedonian Cup: 2013–14, 2014–15

Vardar

- 1. MFL: 2015–16, 2016–17

Rijeka

- Croatian Cup: 2018–19, 2019–20
- Croatian Super Cup runner-up: 2019
