= Ivan Lepinjica =

Croatian association football player

Personal information
- Date of birth: 9 July 1999 (age 27)
- Place of birth: Rijeka, Croatia
- Height: 1.90 m (6 ft 3 in)
- Position: Midfielder

Team information
- Current team: Sabah
- Number: 13

Youth career
- 2007–2013: Pazinka
- 2013–2018: Rijeka

Senior career*
Years	Team	Apps	(Gls)
2018–2023	Rijeka	79	(3)
2018	→ Zadar (loan)	12	(1)
2022–2023	→ Arminia Bielefeld (loan)	22	(0)
2023–2024	Slaven Belupo	22	(3)
2024–	Sabah	52	(2)

International career
2017	Croatia U19	3	(0)
2019	Croatia U20	1	(0)
2019	Croatia U21	5	(0)
- * Club domestic league appearances and goals as of 22 June 2026

Ivan Lepinjica (born 9 July 1999) is a Croatian professional footballer who plays as a midfielder for Azerbaijan Premier League club Sabah.

== Club career ==
On 12 August 2022, Lepinjica joined Arminia Bielefeld in the 2. Bundesliga on loan with an option to buy.

== Career statistics ==
As of 7 August 2022

Appearances and goals by club, season and competition
Club	Season	League			Croatian Cup		Continental		Other		Total	
Club	Season	Division	Apps	Goals	Apps	Goals	Apps	Goals	Apps	Goals	Apps	Goals
Zadar (loan)	2018–19	Druga HNL	12	1	2	1	—		—		14	2
Rijeka	2018–19	Prva HNL	12	1	2	0	—		—		14	1
Rijeka	2019–20	Prva HNL	27	1	5	0	4 (Note: Appearances in UEFA Europa League)	0	1 (Note: Appearance in Croatian Super Cup)	0	37	1
Rijeka	2020–21	Prva HNL	15	0	1	0	4	0	—		20	0
Rijeka	2021–22	Prva HNL	22	1	5	0	4 (Note: Appearances in UEFA Europa Conference League)	1	—		31	2
Rijeka	2022–23	Prva HNL	1	0	—		—		—		1	0
Rijeka	Total		77	3	13	0	12	1	1	0	103	4
Career total			89	4	15	1	12	1	1	0	117	6

== Honours ==
Rijeka

- Croatian Cup: 2018–19, 2019–20

Sabah

- Azerbaijan Premier League: 2025–26
- Azerbaijan Cup: 2024–25, 2025–26
