= Matko Babić =

Croatian footballer

Personal information
- Date of birth: 28 July 1998 (age 28)
- Place of birth: Zagreb, Croatia
- Height: 1.84 m (6 ft 0 in)
- Position: Forward

Team information
- Current team: Voluntari
- Number: 9

Youth career
- 2006–2009: Dubrava
- 2009–2013: Dinamo Zagreb
- 2013–2014: NK Zagreb
- 2014–2016: Lokomotiva

Senior career*
Years	Team	Apps	(Gls)
2015–2019	Lokomotiva	38	(2)
2016–2017	→ Rudeš (loan)	27	(7)
2019–2020	Rijeka	2	(0)
2020	→ Karviná (loan)	0	(0)
2020–2022	AEL Limassol	28	(7)
2021–2022	→ PAEEK (loan)	26	(4)
2022–2023	Hermannstadt	23	(1)
2023	Radomlje	2	(0)
2024	Rudeš	3	(0)
2024–2025	1599 Șelimbăr	23	(15)
2025–	Voluntari	41	(10)

International career
2015	Croatia U17	9	(1)
2015	Croatia U18	4	(0)
2016	Croatia U19	1	(0)
2018–2019	Croatia U20	2	(0)
2018	Croatia U21	4	(0)
- * Club domestic league appearances and goals as of 24 October 2026

Matko Babić (born 28 July 1998) is a Croatian professional footballer who plays as a forward for Liga I club Voluntari.

== Honours ==
Rudeš

- Croatian Second League: 2016–17

Rijeka

- Croatian Super Cup runner-up: 2019
