= Maxwell Acosty =

Ghanaian footballer (born 1991)

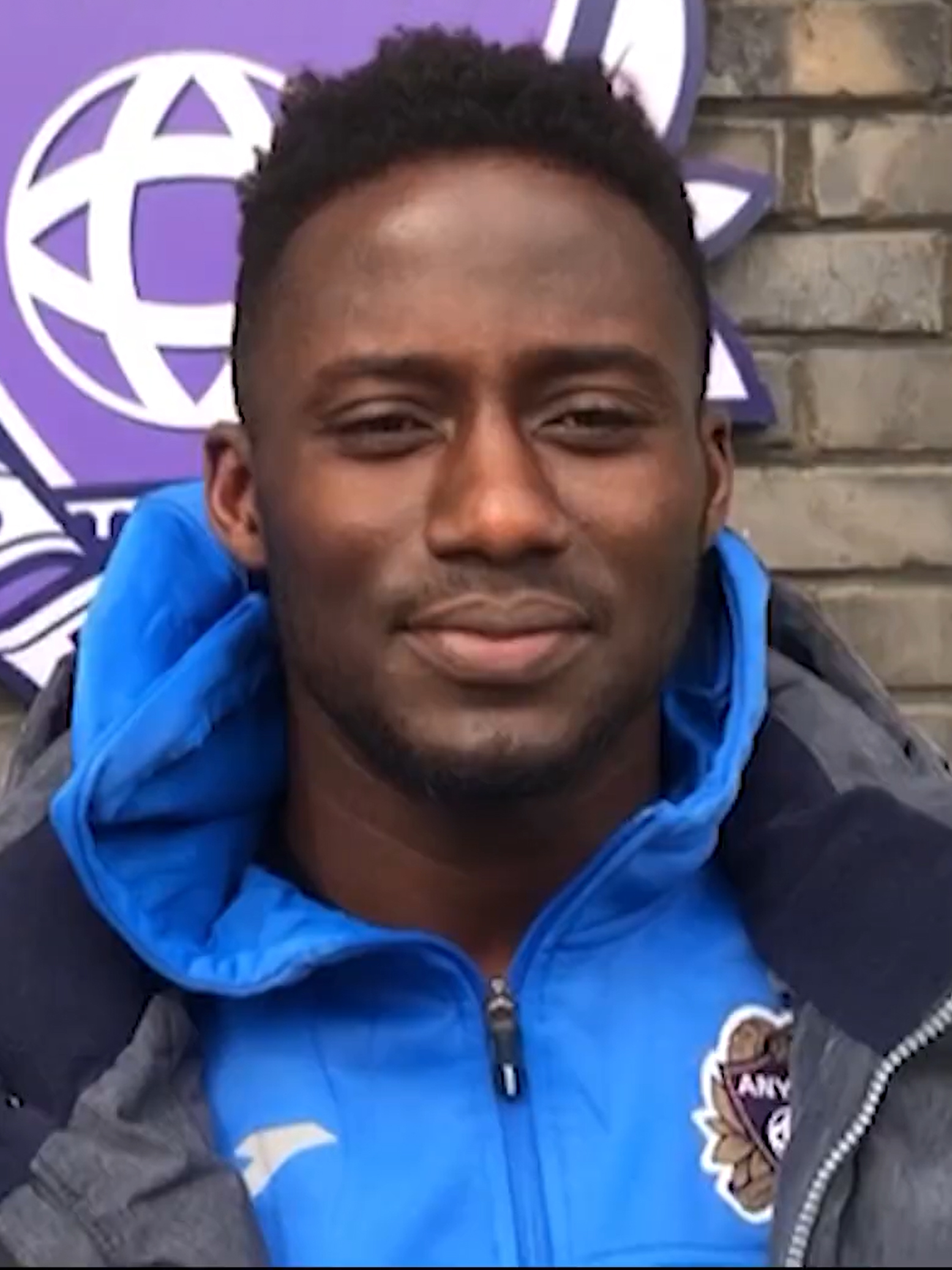
- Acosty with FC Anyang in 2020

Personal information
- Full name: Boadu Maxwell Acosty
- Date of birth: 10 September 1991 (age 35)
- Place of birth: Sunyani, Ghana
- Height: 1.78 m (5 ft 10 in)
- Position: Winger

Team information
- Current team: Tuttocuoio
- Number: 10

Youth career
- –2009: Reggiana
- 2009–2011: Fiorentina

Senior career*
Years	Team	Apps	(Gls)
2008–2009	Reggiana	12	(1)
2009–2015	Fiorentina	5	(0)
2012–2013	→ Juve Stabia (loan)	37	(1)
2013–2014	→ Chievo (loan)	7	(0)
2014	→ Carpi (loan)	12	(0)
2014–2015	→ Modena (loan)	18	(1)
2015–2017	Latina	49	(9)
2017–2017	Crotone	11	(0)
2017–2020	Rijeka	68	(16)
2020–2022	FC Anyang	68	(19)
2023–2024	Suwon Samsung Bluewings	25	(4)
2024–	Tuttocuoio	5	(1)
- * Club domestic league appearances and goals as of 17 November 2024

Boadu Maxwell Acosty (born 10 September 1991) is a Ghanaian professional footballer who plays as a winger for Italian Serie D club Tuttocuoio.

== Career ==
=== Reggiana ===
Acosty started his youth and senior career with Italian club Reggiana in the 2008–09 Lega Pro Prima Divisione season before going on to sign for Fiorentina in July 2009.

=== Fiorentina ===
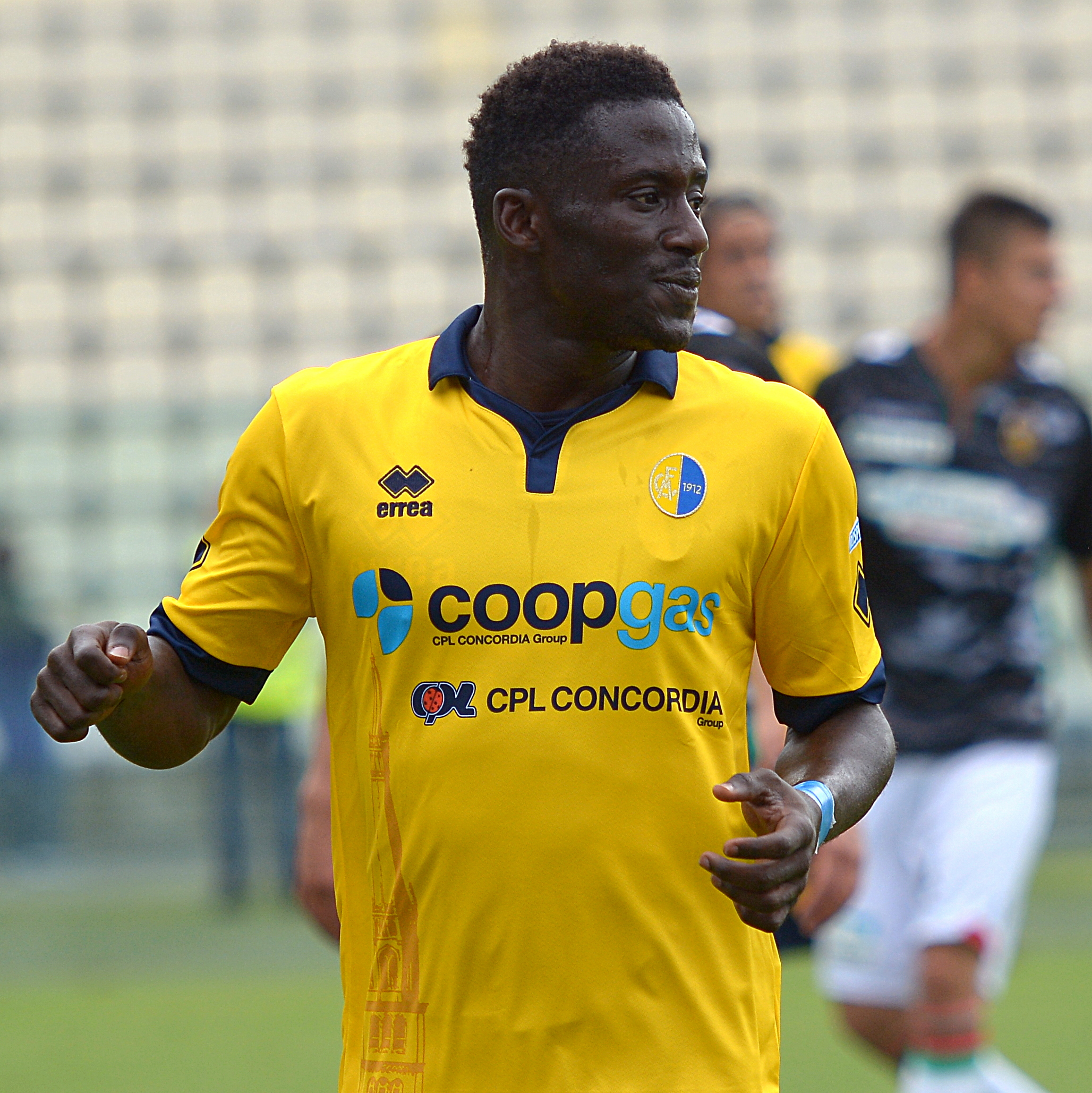
Acosty with Modena in 2015

Acosty made his Serie A debut for Fiorentina on 22 January 2012, in a match against Cagliari when he came on as a substitute in the 64th minute for teammate Adem Ljajić.

=== FC Anyang ===
After having played for HNK Rijeka in the Croatian First Football League between 2017 and 2020, Acosty joined Korean second division side FC Anyang in February 2020 as free transfer.

== Career statistics ==
As of 26 February 2020

Appearances and goals by club, season and competition
Club	Season	League			Cup		Continental		Total	
Club	Season	Division	Apps	Goals	Apps	Goals	Apps	Goals	Apps	Goals
Reggiana	2008–09	Lega Pro Prima	12	1	0	0	–		12	1
Fiorentina	2009–10	Serie A	0	0	0	0	0	0	0	0
Fiorentina	2010–11	Serie A	0	0	0	0	0	0	0	0
Fiorentina	2011–12	Serie A	5	0	0	0	0	0	5	0
Juve Stabia (loan)	2012–13	Serie B	37	1	3	1	–		40	2
Chievo (loan)	2013–14	Serie A	7	0	1	0	–		8	0
Carpi (loan)	2013–14	Serie B	12	0	0	0	–		12	0
Modena (loan)	2014–15	Serie B	18	1	1	0	–		19	1
Latina	2015–16	Serie B	33	7	0	0	–		33	7
Latina	2016–17	Serie B	16	2	0	0	–		16	2
Crotone	2016–17	Serie A	11	0	0	0	–		11	0
Rijeka	2017–18	Croatian First League	22	6	3	0	6	1	31	7
Rijeka	2018–19	Croatian First League	29	7	3	0	2	0	34	7
Rijeka	2019–20	Croatian First League	17	3	1	0	4	0	22	3
FC Anyang	2020	K League 2	19	7	2	0	-	-	21	7
Career total			238	35	14	1	12	1	264	37

== Honours ==
Rijeka

- Croatian Cup: 2018–19

Individual

- K League 2 Top Assist Provider Award: 2022
