= Mario Pavelić =

Austrian footballer

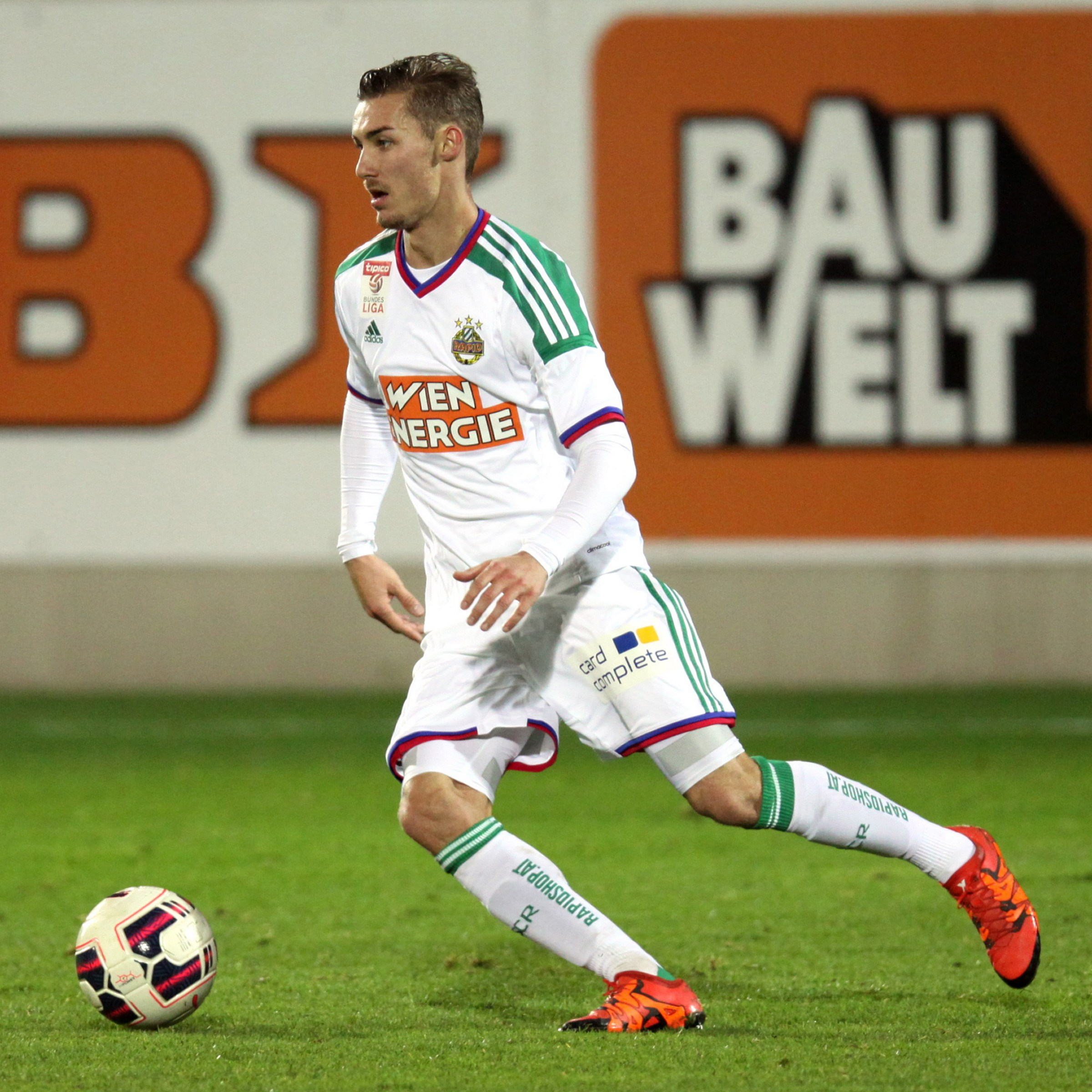
- Pavelić with Rapid Wien in 2015

Personal information
- Date of birth: 19 September 1993 (age 33)
- Place of birth: Eisenstadt, Austria
- Height: 1.80 m (5 ft 11 in)
- Position: Right back

Team information
- Current team: SV Leobendorf
- Number: 23

Youth career
- 2001–2009: Neusiedl am See
- 2009–2011: Rapid Wien

Senior career*
Years	Team	Apps	(Gls)
2011–2014	Rapid Wien II	58	(2)
2013–2018	Rapid Wien	104	(4)
2018–2020	Rijeka	9	(1)
2019	→ Sarpsborg 08 (loan)	8	(0)
2020	→ Admira Wacker (loan)	14	(1)
2020–2021	Wolfsberger AC	10	(0)
2021–2023	Žalgiris	70	(2)
2025–	SV Leobendorf	45	(1)

International career
2009	Austria U16	2	(0)
2010	Austria U17	2	(0)
2010	Austria U18	1	(0)
2012	Austria U19	3	(0)
- * Club domestic league appearances and goals as of 28 June 2026

Mario Pavelić (born 19 September 1993) is an Austrian professional footballer who plays as a right back for SV Leobendorf.

== Club career ==
In summer 2013, he was promoted to Rapid Wien's first team squad by head coach Zoran Barišić. In May 2018, Pavelić signed a three-year contract with HNK Rijeka in Croatia. On 31 July 2019, Pavelić was loaned to Sarpsborg 08 FF in Norway until the end of the year.

On 5 October 2020, he signed with Wolfsberger AC.

In August 2021 he signed with Lithuanian FK Žalgiris. On 9 August 2021 he made his debut in A Lyga against Banga. On 25 October Žalgiris announced that player left the club.

== International career ==
Pavelić was born in Austria to Bosnian parents from Sarajevo, and was called up to represent Bosnia internationally. Pavelić has represented Austria at youth levels, from under-16 to under-19.

== Honours ==
=== Rijeka ===
- Croatian Cup: 2019
