= Roberto Punčec =

Croatian footballer

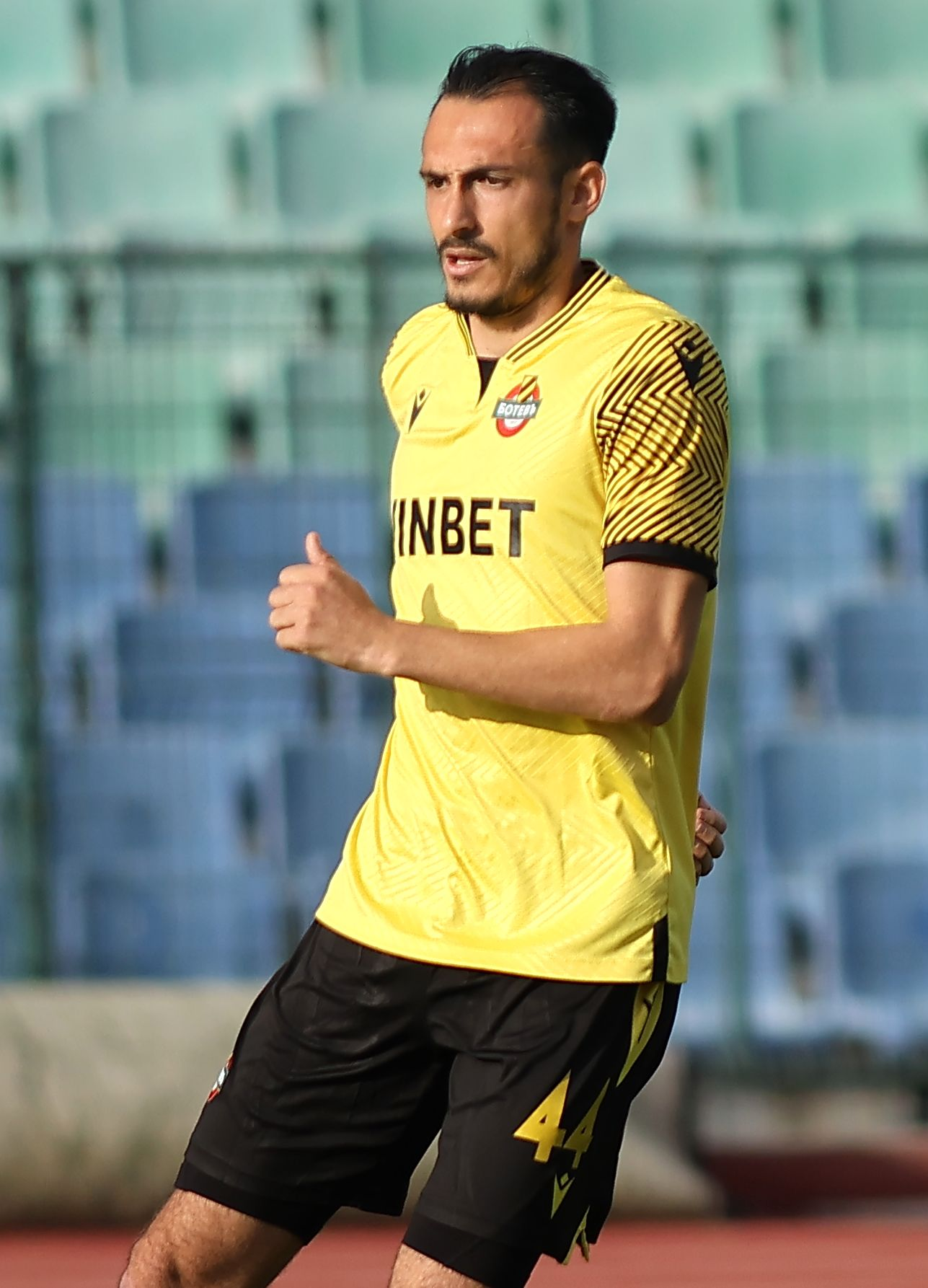
- Punčec in Botev Plovdiv

Personal information
- Date of birth: 27 October 1991 (age 35)
- Place of birth: Varaždin, Croatia
- Height: 1.86 m (6 ft 1 in)
- Position: Defender

Team information
- Current team: Varaždin
- Number: 14

Youth career
- 1999–2002: Trnje Trnovec
- 2002–2009: Varteks

Senior career*
Years	Team	Apps	(Gls)
2008–2011	Varteks / Varaždin	53	(1)
2011–2013	Maccabi Tel Aviv	18	(0)
2012–2013	→ Union Berlin (loan)	21	(0)
2013–2017	Union Berlin	100	(1)
2017–2019	Rijeka	58	(1)
2019–2021	Sporting Kansas City	23	(0)
2022–2023	Botev Plovdiv	44	(0)
2024–2025	Šibenik	34	(1)
2025–	Varaždin	20	(0)

International career^{‡}
2005	Croatia U14	2	(0)
2007	Croatia U16	4	(0)
2007–2008	Croatia U17	4	(0)
2009	Croatia U18	7	(0)
2009–2010	Croatia U19	10	(0)
2011	Croatia U20	3	(0)
2010–2011	Croatia U21	6	(0)
Medal record
Men's football
Representing Croatia
UEFA European Under-19 Championship
Bronze medal – third place	2010 France
- * Club domestic league appearances and goals as of 15 June 2026 ‡ National team caps and goals as of 27 May 2015

Roberto Punčec (Croatian: [pûːntʃeːts]; born 27 October 1991) is a Croatian professional footballer who plays as a defender for Varaždin.

== Club career ==
A product of NK Varteks youth academy, Punčec joined the first team in the 2008–09 season and had his professional debut on 2 November 2008 in a league match against Hajduk Split. He went on to appear in 27 matches for the club in his first two professional seasons, with the club changing its name to NK Varaždin in mid-2010.

After filing for arbitration to Croatian Football Federation his contract with the financially troubled Varaždin was terminated due to unpaid wages, and on 31 August 2011, Punčec signed a two-year contract with Maccabi Tel Aviv.

In July 2012, Punčec joined Union Berlin on a season-long loan with the option to buy. Following five years with Union Berlin, in June 2017, Punčec joined Rijeka on a three-year deal as a free-agent.

On 4 December 2019, it was announced Punčec would join Major League Soccer club Sporting Kansas City ahead of the 2020 season. Following the 2021 season, Punčec's contract option was declined by Kansas City. In February 2022, he signed a contract with Bulgarian club Botev Plovdiv.

== International career ==
Punčec has been capped at the Croatia national team at every youth level, and was part of the Croatia squad at the 2011 FIFA U-20 World Cup in Colombia, playing in all three of their group stage matches.

== Career statistics ==
As of 3 November 2019

Appearances and goals by club, season and competition
Club	Season	League			Cup		Continental		Total	
Club	Season	Division	Apps	Goals	Apps	Goals	Apps	Goals	Apps	Goals
Varteks	2008–09	Prva HNL	6	0	–		–		6	0
Varteks	2009–10	Prva HNL	21	1	5	0	–		26	1
Varaždin	2010–11	Prva HNL	25	0	6	2	–		31	2
Varaždin	2011–12	Prva HNL	1	0	–		2	0	3	0
Varteks / Varaždin total			53	1	11	2	2	0	66	3
Maccabi Tel Aviv	2011–12	Premier League	18	0	–		5	0	23	0
Union Berlin	2012–13	2. Bundesliga	21	0	2	0	–		23	0
Union Berlin	2013–14	2. Bundesliga	21	0	2	0	–		23	0
Union Berlin	2014–15	2. Bundesliga	30	0	1	0	–		31	0
Union Berlin	2015–16	2. Bundesliga	23	1	0	0	–		23	1
Union Berlin	2016–17	2. Bundesliga	26	0	2	0	–		28	0
Union Berlin	Total		121	1	7	0	0	0	128	1
Rijeka	2017–18	Prva Liga	27	1	3	0	3	0	33	1
Rijeka	2018–19	Prva Liga	22	0	4	0	2	0	28	0
Rijeka	2019–20	Prva Liga	9	0	3	2	4	0	16	2
Rijeka	Total		58	1	10	2	9	0	77	3
Career total			250	3	28	4	16	0	294	7

== Honours ==
=== Rijeka ===
- Croatian Cup: 2019
