= Luka Capan =

Croatian footballer

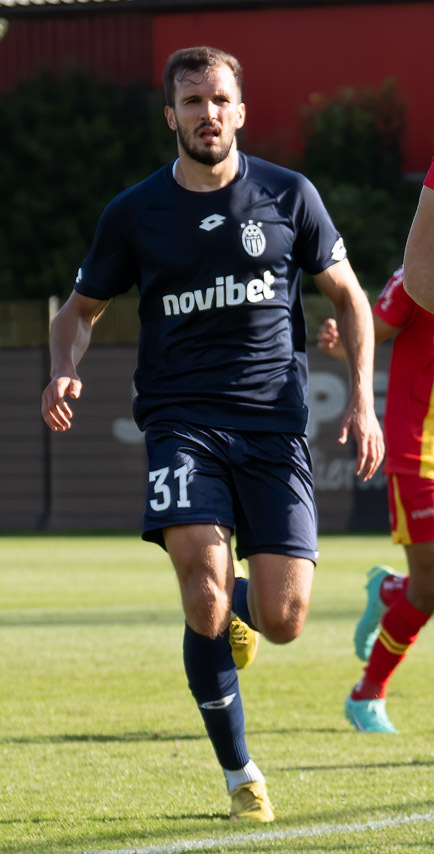
- Capan with A.E. Kifisia in 2023

Personal information
- Date of birth: 6 April 1995 (age 31)
- Place of birth: Zagreb, Croatia
- Height: 1.86 m (6 ft 1 in)
- Position: Centre-back

Team information
- Current team: SV Ried
- Number: 29

Youth career
- 2004–2010: NK Zagreb
- 2010–2014: Dinamo Zagreb

Senior career*
Years	Team	Apps	(Gls)
2013–2015	Dinamo Zagreb	6	(0)
2014–2015	Dinamo Zagreb II	27	(2)
2015–2017	Lokomotiva Zagreb	65	(6)
2018–2021	Rijeka	69	(2)
2021–2022	Bursaspor	28	(1)
2022–2023	Budapest Honvéd	18	(0)
2023–2024	Kifisia	20	(0)
2024–2026	TSC	43	(0)
2026–	SV Ried	0	(0)

International career^{‡}
2011	Croatia U17	2	(0)
2013	Croatia U19	4	(0)
2015–2016	Croatia U21	7	(0)
- * Club domestic league appearances and goals as of 7 September 2026 ‡ National team caps and goals as of 17 November 2017

Luka Capan (born 6 April 1995) is a professional Croatian footballer who plays as a centre-back for Austrian club SV Ried.

== Career ==
His first involvement with Dinamo Zagreb was being an unused substitute in an UEFA Europa League defeat to Ludogorets in December 2013. He was included in the squad following the injury of Jeremy Taravel. He made his debut for the club in a 6–1 win against Slaven Belupo in March 2014, coming as a 60th-minute substitute for Jozo Šimunović. In January 2018, Capan signed a three-and-a-half-year contract with HNK Rijeka.

In July 2023, Capan joined newly promoted Super League Greece club Kifisia.

In May 2024, Capan joined Serbian SuperLiga club TSC.

On 2 September 2026, Capan joined Austrian Bundesliga side SV Ried.

== Career statistics ==
As of 8 August 2023

Club	Season	League			Cup		Continental		Other		Total	
Club	Season	Division	Apps	Goals	Apps	Goals	Apps	Goals	Apps	Goals	Apps	Goals
Dinamo Zagreb	2013–14	Prva HNL	6	0	3	0	0	0	—		9	0
Dinamo Zagreb	2014–15	Prva HNL	0	0	0	0	0	0	—		0	0
Dinamo Zagreb	Total		6	0	3	0	0	0	—		9	0
Lokomotiva Zagreb	2015–16	Prva HNL	26	1	1	0	4	0	—		31	1
Lokomotiva Zagreb	2016–17	Prva HNL	25	1	3	0	7	0	—		35	1
Lokomotiva Zagreb	2017–18	Prva HNL	14	4	2	0	—		—		16	4
Lokomotiva Zagreb	Total		65	6	6	0	11	0	—		82	6
Rijeka	2017–18	Prva HNL	11	0	0	0	—		—		11	0
Rijeka	2018–19	Prva HNL	16	1	3	0	2	0	—		21	1
Rijeka	2019–20	Prva HNL	19	0	4	0	4	0	—		27	0
Rijeka	2020–21	Prva HNL	23	1	3	0	5	0	—		31	1
Rijeka	Total		69	2	10	0	11	0	—		90	2
Bursaspor	2021–22	TFF 1. Lig	28	1	2	0	—		—		30	1
Budapest Honvéd	2022–23	NB I	18	0	1	0	—		—		19	0
Career total			186	9	22	0	22	0	0	0	230	9
