= 2019–20 Croatian Football Cup =

Tournament details
- Country: Croatia
- Teams: 48

Final positions
- Champions: Rijeka
- Runners-up: Lokomotiva

Tournament statistics
- Matches played: 47
- Goals scored: 197 (4.19 per match)
- Top goal scorer(s): Justin Mathieu, Łukasz Zwoliński (5)

The 2019–20 Croatian Football Cup was the twenty-ninth season of Croatia's football knockout competition. The defending champions were Rijeka, having won their fifth title the previous year by defeating Dinamo Zagreb in the final.

== Calendar ==
Round	Date(s)	Number of fixtures	Clubs	New entries this round	Goals / games
Preliminary round	29 August 2019	16	48 → 32	32	70 / 16
First round	25 September 2019	16	32 → 16	16	84 / 16
Second round	30 October 2019	8	16 → 8	none	23 / 8
Quarter-finals	4 December 2019	4	8 → 4	none	10 / 4
Semi-finals	30 May 2020	2	4 → 2	none	9 / 2
Final	1 August 2020	1	2 → 1	none	1 / 1

== Participating clubs ==
The following 48 teams qualified for the competition:

Best clubs by cup coefficient 16 clubs	Winners and runners up of county cups 32 clubs
Dinamo Zagreb; Rijeka; Hajduk Split; Slaven Belupo; RNK Split; Osijek; Lokomotiva; Inter Zaprešić; Istra 1961; Vinogradar; Zadar; Šibenik; Cibalia; NK Zagreb; Rudeš; Novigrad	Osijek-Baranja County cup winner: Belišće; Osijek-Baranja County cup runner up: BSK Bijelo Brdo; Zagreb County cup winner: Kurilovec; Zagreb County cup runner up: Gorica; Brod-Posavina County cup winner: Oriolik; Brod-Posavina County cup runner up: Sloga Nova Gradiška; Vukovar-Srijem County cup winner: Slavonac; Vukovar-Srijem County cup runner up: Vuteks-Sloga; Međimurje County cup winner: Međimurje; Međimurje County cup runner up: Nedelišće; Koprivnica-Križevci County cup winner: Mladost (KP); Koprivnica-Križevci County cup runner up: Borac Imbriovec; Istria County cup winner: Buje; Istria County cup runner up: Jadran-Poreč; Sisak-Moslavina County cup winner: Segesta; Sisak-Moslavina County cup runner up: Mladost Petrinja; Virovitica-Podravina County cup winner: Papuk Orahovica; Virovitica-Podravina County cup runner up: Suhopolje; Varaždin County cup winner: Varaždin; Varaždin County cup runner up: Bednja; Bjelovar-Bilogora County cup winner: Bjelovar; Bjelovar-Bilogora County cup runner up: Dinamo Predavac; Split-Dalmatia County cup winner: Hrvace; City of Zagreb cup winner: Maksimir; Primorje-Gorski Kotar County cup winner: Opatija; Požega-Slavonia County cup winner: Slavonija; Zadar County cup winner: Primorac Biograd na Moru; Karlovac County cup winner: Karlovac 1919; Dubrovnik-Neretva County cup winner: Jadran Luka Ploče; Krapina-Zagorje County cup winner: Zagorec Krapina; Šibenik-Knin County cup winner: Zagora Unešić; Lika-Senj County cup winner: Nehaj Senj

== Preliminary round ==
The draw for the preliminary single-legged round was held on 30 July 2019 and the matches were played on 28 August 2019.

Tie no	Home team	Score	Away team
1	Mladost (KP)	1–4	Sloga Nova Gradiška
2	Nehaj Senj	0–2	Karlovac 1919
3	Primorac Biograd na Moru	1–3	BSK Bijelo Brdo
4	Dinamo Predavac	1–3 (a.e.t.)	Kurilovec
5^{*}	Suhopolje	2–6	Oriolik
6^{**}	Hrvace	3–1	Segesta
7	Slavonac Komletinci	2–2 (3–4 p)	Buje
8	Gorica	10–0	Zagorec Krapina
9	Bednja	1–2 (a.e.t.)	Vuteks-Sloga
10	Bjelovar	0–3	Opatija
11	Maksimir	2–6	Varaždin
12	Zagora Unešić	5–1	Papuk Orahovica
13	Belišće	0–0 (4–2 p)	Jadran Luka Ploče
14	Borac Imbriovec	1–3	Jadran-Poreč
15	Nedelišće	0–2	Slavonija Požega
16	Mladost Petrinja	3–0	Međimurje

* Match played on 14 August.
** Match played on 27 August.

== First round ==
The first round was played on 25 September 2019.

Tie no	Home team	Score	Away team
1^{*}	Karlovac 1919	0–7	Dinamo Zagreb
2^{**}	Buje	0–11	Rijeka
3	Mladost Petrinja	0–2	Hajduk Split
4^{*}	Hrvace	1–2	Slaven Belupo
5	Belišće	3–1 (a.e.t.)	RNK Split
6^{*}	Vuteks-Sloga	0–8	Osijek
7^{*}	Oriolik	0–3	Lokomotiva
8	Jadran-Poreč	3–7	Inter Zaprešić
9	Kurilovec	2–3 (a.e.t.)	Istra 1961
10	Sloga Nova Gradiška	1–2	Vinogradar
11	Zagora Unešić	1–2 (a.e.t.)	Zadar
12	Slavonija Požega	1–5	Šibenik
13	BSK Bijelo Brdo	1–0	Cibalia
14	Gorica	8–0	NK Zagreb
15	Varaždin	4–2	Rudeš
16	Opatija	3–1	Novigrad

* Matches played on 24 September.
** Match played on 1 October.

== Second round ==
The second round was played on 30 October 2019.

Tie no	Home team	Score	Away team
1	Opatija	0–3	Dinamo Zagreb
2	Varaždin	1–2	Rijeka
3	Gorica	2–1	Hajduk Split
4	BSK Bijelo Brdo	0–2	Slaven Belupo
5	Šibenik	2–1	Belišće
6^{*}	Zadar	0–3	Osijek
7	Vinogradar	0–3	Lokomotiva
8	Istra 1961	1–2	Inter Zaprešić

* Match played on 23 October.

== Quarter-finals ==
The quarter-finals were played on 3 and 4 December 2019.

Tie no	Home team	Score	Away team
1	Rijeka	1–0	Dinamo Zagreb
2	Inter Zaprešić	0–2	Osijek
3	Šibenik	0–4	Lokomotiva
4	Gorica	1–2	Slaven Belupo

== Semi-finals ==
The semi-finals were played on 30 and 31 May 2020.

30 May 2020
20:15

Slaven Belupo	1–3	Lokomotiva
Goda 6'	Report	Çokaj 67'; Tolić 79'; Uzuni 90+5'

Gradski Stadion Ivan Kušek Apaš, Koprivnica
Attendance: 0 (Note: The match was played behind closed doors due to the COVID-19 pandemic in Croatia.)
Referee: Ivan Bebek (Rijeka)

31 May 2020
20:15

Rijeka	3–2	Osijek
Murić 66'; Čolak 74' (pen.); Yatéké 86'	Report	Bočkaj 16', 48'

Stadion Rujevica, Rijeka
Attendance: 0
Referee: Igor Pajač (Zelina)

== Final ==
The final was played on 1 August 2020.

1 August 2020
20:30 CEST

Rijeka	1–0	Lokomotiva
Halilović 76'	Report

Stadion Šubićevac, Šibenik
Attendance: 0
Referee: Tihomir Pejin (Donji Miholjac)

== Bracket ==
Second round 30 October 2019
Varaždin	1
Rijeka	2
Opatija	0
Dinamo Zagreb	3
Istra 1961	1
Inter Zaprešić	2
Zadar	0
Osijek	3
Gorica	2
Hajduk Split	1
BSK Bijelo Brdo	0
Slaven Belupo	2
Šibenik	2
Belišće	1
Vinogradar	0
Lokomotiva	3

Quarter-finals; 3–4 December 2019
Rijeka	1
Dinamo Zagreb	0
Inter Zaprešić	0
Osijek	2
Gorica	1
Slaven Belupo	2
Šibenik	0
Lokomotiva	4

Semi-finals; 30–31 May 2020
Rijeka	3
Osijek	2
Slaven Belupo	1
Lokomotiva	3

Final; 1 August 2020
Rijeka	1
Lokomotiva	0

== Top scorers ==
Rank	Player	Club(s)	Goals
1	(Netherlands) Justin Mathieu	Gorica	5
1	(Poland) Łukasz Zwoliński	Gorica	5
3	(Croatia) Drago Gabrić	Zagora Unešić	4
3	(Croatia) Dominik Glavina	Varaždin	4
3	(Croatia) Antonio Mance	Osijek	4
3	(Croatia) Vice Miljanić	Jadran-Poreč	4
3	(Senegal) Cherif Ndiaye	Gorica	4
8	(Croatia) Antonio Čolak	Rijeka	3
8	(Croatia) Domagoj Drožđek	Lokomotiva	3
8	(Switzerland) Mario Gavranović	Dinamo Zagreb	3
8	(Croatia) Goran Jurić	Oriolik	3
8	(Poland) Damian Kądzior	Dinamo Zagreb	3
8	(Croatia) Patrik Mijić	Oriolik	3
8	(Croatia) Josip Mitrović	Inter Zaprešić	3
