= 2018–19 Croatian Football Cup =

Tournament details
- Country: Croatia
- Teams: 48

Final positions
- Champions: Rijeka
- Runners-up: Dinamo Zagreb

Tournament statistics
- Matches played: 47
- Goals scored: 160 (3.4 per match)
- Top goal scorer: Antonio Čolak (7)

The 2018–19 Croatian Football Cup was the twenty-eighth season of Croatia's football knockout competition. The defending champions were Dinamo Zagreb, having won their fifteenth title the previous year by defeating Hajduk Split in the final.

== Calendar ==
| Round | Date(s) | Number of fixtures | Clubs | New entries this round | Goals / games |
|---|---|---|---|---|---|
| Preliminary round | 29 August 2018 | 16 | 48 → 32 | 32 | 56 / 16 |
| First round | 26 September 2018 | 16 | 32 → 16 | 16 | 55 / 16 |
| Second round | 31 October 2018 | 8 | 16 → 8 | none | 30 / 8 |
| Quarter-finals | 5 December 2018 | 4 | 8 → 4 | none | 10 / 4 |
| Semi-finals | 24 April 2019 | 2 | 4 → 2 | none | 5 / 2 |
| Final | 22 May 2019 | 1 | 2 → 1 | none | 4 / 1 |

== Participating clubs ==
The following 48 teams qualified for the competition:

| Best clubs by cup coefficient 16 clubs | Winners and runners up of county cups 32 clubs |
| Cibalia; Dinamo Zagreb; GOŠK Dubrovnik 1919; Hajduk Split; Inter Zaprešić; Istra 1961; Lokomotiva; Osijek; Rijeka; Slaven Belupo; RNK Split; Šibenik; Vinogradar; Zadar; NK Zagreb; Zelina | Osijek-Baranja County cup winner: BSK Bijelo Brdo; Osijek-Baranja County cup runner up: Višnjevac; Zagreb County cup winner: Kurilovec; Zagreb County cup runner up: Sava Strmec; Brod-Posavina County cup winner: Marsonia; Brod-Posavina County cup runner up: Sloga Nova Gradiška; Vukovar-Srijem County cup winner: Vukovar 1991; Vukovar-Srijem County cup runner up: Graničar Županja; Međimurje County cup winner: Međimurje; Međimurje County cup runner up: Nedelišće; City of Zagreb cup winner: Hrvatski Dragovoljac; City of Zagreb cup runner up: Vrapče; Istria County cup winner: Rovinj; Istria County cup runner up: Rudar Labin; Sisak-Moslavina County cup winner: Libertas Novska; Sisak-Moslavina County cup runner up: Segesta; Virovitica-Podravina County cup winner: Pitomača; Virovitica-Podravina County cup runner up: Suhopolje; Varaždin County cup winner: Varaždin; Varaždin County cup runner up: Bednja; Koprivnica-Križevci County cup winner: Koprivnica; Koprivnica-Križevci County cup runner up: Križevci; Bjelovar-Bilogora County cup winner: Bjelovar; Split-Dalmatia County cup winner: Sloga Mravince; Primorje-Gorski Kotar County cup winner: Krk; Požega-Slavonia County cup winner: Slavija Pleternica; Zadar County cup winner: Primorac Biograd na Moru; Karlovac County cup winner: Karlovac 1919; Dubrovnik-Neretva County cup winner: Jadran Luka Ploče; Krapina-Zagorje County cup winner: Zagorec Krapina; Šibenik-Knin County cup winner: Zagora Unešić; Lika-Senj County cup winner: Nehaj Senj |

== Preliminary round ==
The draw for the preliminary single-legged round was held on 1 August 2018 and the matches were played on 29 August 2018.

| Tie no | Home team | Score | Away team |
|---|---|---|---|
| 1 | Bednja | 2–0 | Pitomača |
| 2 | Suhopolje | 2–3 | Kurilovec |
| 3 | Slavija Pleternica | 1–0 | Segesta |
| 4 | Koprivnica | 1–3 | Sloga Mravince |
| 5 | Križevci | 2–0 | Rovinj |
| 6 | Zagorec Krapina | 9–0 | Libertas Novska |
| 7 | Višnjevac | 1–2 | Vrapče |
| 8 | BSK Bijelo Brdo | 0–0 (3–4 p) | Vukovar 1991 |
| 9^{**} | Rudar Labin | 0–3 | Krk |
| 10^{***} | Nehaj Senj | 4–1 | Graničar Županja |
| 11^{*} | Primorac Biograd na Moru | 3–1 | Zagora Unešić |
| 12 | Jadran Luka Ploče | 1–0 | Bjelovar |
| 13 | Međimurje | 5–0 | Sava Strmec |
| 14 | Nedelišće | 2–4 | Sloga Nova Gradiška |
| 15^{***} | Hrvatski Dragovoljac | 0–3 | Varaždin |
| 16 | Karlovac 1919 | 1–2 | Marsonia |

* Match played on 18 August.
** Match played on 21 August.
*** Matches played on 28 August.

== First round ==
The draw for the first round was held on 31 August 2018 and the matches were played on 26 September 2018.

| Tie no | Home team | Score | Away team |
|---|---|---|---|
| 1 | Sloga Mravince | 0–1 | Dinamo Zagreb |
| 2 | Križevci | 0–9 | Rijeka |
| 3 | Vrapče | 0–2 | Hajduk Split |
| 4^{***} | Kurilovec | 0–2 | Slaven Belupo |
| 5 | Jadran Luka Ploče | 3–1 | RNK Split |
| 6^{**} | Zagorec Krapina | 0–3 | Osijek |
| 7 | Primorac Biograd na Moru | 0–1 | Lokomotiva |
| 8 | Sloga Nova Gradiška | 2–4 | Istra 1961 |
| 9^{*} | Bednja | 0–3 | Inter Zaprešić |
| 10^{***} | Vukovar 1991 | 3–5 (a.e.t.) | Zadar |
| 11 | Krk | 1–0 | Cibalia |
| 12 | Slavija Pleternica | 0–4 | Vinogradar |
| 13 | Marsonia | 3–0 | NK Zagreb |
| 14 | Nehaj Senj | 2–2 (2–4 p) | Šibenik |
| 15 | Varaždin | 2–0 | Međimurje |
| 16 | Zelina | 2–0 | GOŠK Dubrovnik 1919 |

* Match played on 18 September.
** Match played on 19 September.
*** Matches played on 25 September.

== Second round ==
The second round matches were played on 31 October 2018.

| Tie no | Home team | Score | Away team |
|---|---|---|---|
| 1 | Zelina | 0–4 | Dinamo Zagreb |
| 2 | Varaždin | 1–2 | Rijeka |
| 3 | Šibenik | 1–2 (a.e.t.) | Hajduk Split |
| 4 | Marsonia | 0–1 | Slaven Belupo |
| 5 | Vinogradar | 4–2 | Jadran Luka Ploče |
| 6 | Krk | 1–5 | Osijek |
| 7^{*} | Zadar | 1–3 | Lokomotiva |
| 8^{*} | Inter Zaprešić | 2–1 | Istra 1961 |

* Matches played on 30 October.

== Quarter-finals ==
The quarter-final matches were played on 5 December 2018.

| Tie no | Home team | Score | Away team |
|---|---|---|---|
| 1 | Dinamo Zagreb | 1–0 | Slaven Belupo |
| 2^{*} | Lokomotiva | 1–2 | Rijeka |
| 3^{*} | Inter Zaprešić | 3–0 | Vinogradar |
| 4 | Osijek | 2–1 | Hajduk Split |

* Matches played on 4 December.

== Semi-finals ==
Semi-final matches are scheduled for 24 April 2019.

23 April 2019
18:00

| Dinamo Zagreb | 2–0 | Osijek |
|---|---|---|
| Olmo 18'; Šunjić 90' | Report |

Stadion Maksimir, Zagreb
Attendance: 3,483
Referee: Ivan Bebek (Rijeka)

24 April 2019
18:00

| Inter Zaprešić | 1–2 | Rijeka |
|---|---|---|
| Brezovec 90+1' | Report | Murić 30'; Lončar 86' |

Stadion ŠRC Zaprešić, Zaprešić
Attendance: 2,463
Referee: Mario Zebec (Cestica)

== Final ==
The final was played on 22 May 2019 at Stadion Aldo Drosina in Pula.

22 May 2019
18:00

| Dinamo Zagreb | 1−3 | Rijeka |
|---|---|---|
| Oršić 63' | Report | Čolak 13'; Halilović 39'; Kvržić 84' |

Stadion Aldo Drosina, Pula
Attendance: 6,742
Referee: Damir Batinić (Osijek)

== Bracket ==
Second round 30–31 October 2018
Zadar | 1
Lokomotiva | 3
Varaždin | 1
Rijeka | 2
Inter Zaprešić | 2
Istra 1961 | 1
Vinogradar | 4
Jadran Luka Ploče | 2
Krk | 1
Osijek | 5
Šibenik | 1
Hajduk Split | 2 (a.e.t.)
Zelina | 0
Dinamo Zagreb | 4
Marsonia | 0
Slaven Belupo | 1

Quarter-finals; 4–5 December 2018
Lokomotiva | 1
Rijeka | 2
Inter Zaprešić | 3
Vinogradar | 0
Osijek | 2
Hajduk Split | 1
Dinamo Zagreb | 1
Slaven Belupo | 0

Semi-finals; 23–24 April 2019
Inter Zaprešić | 1
Rijeka | 2
Dinamo Zagreb | 2
Osijek | 0

Final; 22 May 2019
Rijeka | 3
Dinamo Zagreb | 1

== Top scorers ==
| Rank | Player | Club(s) | Goals |
|---|---|---|---|
| 1 | (Croatia) Antonio Čolak | Rijeka | 7 |
| 2 | (Croatia) Matija Smrekar | Zagorec Krapina | 5 |
| 3 | (Croatia) Filip Bungić | Sloga Nova Gradiška | 4 |
| 3 | (Croatia) Igor Prijić | Vinogradar | 4 |
| 5 | (Croatia) Vlatko Blažević | Zadar | 3 |
| 5 | (Croatia) Robert Brdar | Krk | 3 |
| 5 | (Croatia) Mihovil Šutalo | Jadran Luka Ploče | 3 |
| 5 | (Croatia) Ivan Vukelić | Nehaj Senj | 3 |
