= 2020–21 HNK Rijeka season =

Rijeka
2020–21 season
- Chairman: Damir Mišković
- Manager: Simon Rožman (until 27 Feb 2021); Goran Tomić (since 1 Mar 2021)
- Stadium: Rujevica
- Prva HNL: 3rd
- Croatian Cup: Semi-final
- UEFA Europa League: Group stage
- Top goalscorer: League: Franko Andrijašević (13); All: Franko Andrijašević (14)
- Highest home attendance: 2,275 v Slaven Belupo (4 October 2020)
- Lowest home attendance: 2,072 v Varaždin (17 October 2020)
- Average home league attendance: 242
Home colours	Away colours

The 2020–21 season was the 75th season in HNK Rijeka’s history. It was their 30th successive season in the Croatian First Football League, and 47th successive top tier season.

== Competitions ==
=== Overall ===
Competition	First match	Last match	Starting round	Final position	Record							
Competition	First match	Last match	Starting round	Final position	Pld	W	D	L	GF	GA	GD	Win %
HT Prva liga	15 August 2020	22 May 2021	Matchday 1	3rd	36	18	7	11	51	46	+5	50.00
Croatian Cup	7 October 2020	14 April 2021	First round	Semi-final	4	3	0	1	12	5	+7	75.00
UEFA Europa League	24 September 2020	10 December 2020	Third qualifying round	Group stage	8	3	1	4	9	12	−3	37.50
Total					48	24	8	16	72	63	+9	50.00

Last updated: 23 May 2021
Source: Competitions

=== HT Prva liga ===
==== League table ====
Pos	Team	Pld	W	D	L	GF	GA	GD	Pts	Qualification or relegation
1	Dinamo Zagreb (C)	36	26	7	3	84	28	+56	85	Qualification for the Champions League first qualifying round
2	Osijek	36	23	8	5	59	25	+34	77	Qualification for the Europa Conference League second qualifying round
3	Rijeka	36	18	7	11	51	46	+5	61	Qualification for the Europa Conference League second qualifying round
4	Hajduk Split	36	18	6	12	48	37	+11	60	Qualification for the Europa Conference League second qualifying round
5	Gorica	36	17	8	11	60	47	+13	59	

Source: PrvaHNL.hr
Rules for classification: 1) Points; 2) Head-to-head points; 3) Head-to-head goal difference; 4) Head-to-head goals scored (at home if two teams tied); 5) Goal difference; 6) Goals scored; 7) Play-off
(Note: Criteria 2-4 and 7 is only used if deciding champion, teams to international competition or teams for relegation and in that case criteria 6 will not be used).
(C) Champions

==== Results summary ====
Overall								Home						Away					
Pld	W	D	L	GF	GA	GD	Pts	W	D	L	GF	GA	GD	W	D	L	GF	GA	GD
36	18	7	11	51	46	+5	61	8	6	4	24	20	+4	10	1	7	27	26	+1

Last updated: 23 May 2021.
Source: Competitive matches

==== Results by round ====
Round	1	2	3	4	5	6	7	8	9	10	11	12	13	14	15	16	17	18	19	20	21	22	23	24	25	26	27	28	29	30	31	32	33	34	35	36
Ground	H	A	H	A	H	A	H	H	A	A	H	A	H	A	H	A	A	H	H	A	H	A	H	A	H	H	A	A	H	A	H	A	H	A	A	H
Result	W	L	W	L	L	W	W	W	D	L	W	W	D	W	D	W	L	L	D	W	D	L	L	L	D	W	W	W	W	W	D	L	L	W	W	W
Position	4	4	4	5	6	5	5	4	5	5	4	4	4	3	4	4	4	4	4	4	4	4	4	4	4	4	4	4	4	3	4	4	4	4	4	3

Updated to match(es) played on 22 May 2021. Source: Competitive matches
A = Away; H = Home; W = Win; D = Draw; L = Loss

==== Results by opponent ====
Team	Results				Points
Team	1	2	3	4	Points
Dinamo Zagreb	2–0	2–2	0–2	1–5	4
Gorica	0–0	0–2	4–3	2–1	7
Hajduk Split	0–1	2–1	0–1	2–3	3
Istra 1961	2–1	2–1	1–1	2–1	10
Lokomotiva	0–1	1–0	3–2	3–0	9
Osijek	0–3	1–1	0–2	0–0	2
Slaven Belupo	2–0	3–1	1–1	2–0	10
Šibenik	2–1	0–2	2–2	1–0	7
Varaždin	2–1	1–2	2–0	3–2	9

Source: 2020–21 Croatian First Football League article

=== UEFA Europa League ===
==== Group stage ====
Pos	Team	Pld	W	D	L	GF	GA	GD	Pts	Qualification	NAP	RSO	AZ	RJK
1	(Italy) Napoli	6	3	2	1	7	4	+3	11	Advance to knockout phase	—	1–1	0–1	2–0
2	(Spain) Real Sociedad	6	2	3	1	5	4	+1	9	Advance to knockout phase	0–1	—	1–0	2–2
3	(Netherlands) AZ	6	2	2	2	7	5	+2	8		1–1	0–0	—	4–1
4	(Croatia) Rijeka	6	1	1	4	6	12	−6	4		1–2	0–1	2–1	—

Source: UEFA
Rules for classification: Group stage tiebreakers

== Matches ==
=== HT Prva liga ===
15 August 2020 1	Rijeka	2–1	Šibenik	Rijeka
17:55 CEST (UTC+02:00)	Lončar (yellow card) 45+1'; Lepinjica (yellow card) 67'; Yatéké (yellow card) 83' (goal) 84'; Murić 90'	Report	9' (yellow card) 75' Bulat; (yellow card) 73' Španja	Stadium: Rujevica; Attendance: Behind closed doors Referee: Damir Batinić (Osijek)

21 August 2020 2	Lokomotiva	1–0	Rijeka	Zagreb
17:55 CEST (UTC+02:00)	Sammir (yellow card) 22'; Halilović (yellow card) 44' (goal) 53'; Vojković (yellow card) 73'	Report	(yellow card) 85' Raspopović	Stadium: Kranjčevićeva; Attendance: Behind closed doors Referee: Duje Strukan (Split)

29 August 2020 3	Rijeka	2–1	Istra 1961	Rijeka
17:55 CEST (UTC+02:00)	Andrijašević 13' 69' (pen.); Galović (yellow card) 53'; Gnezda Čerin (yellow card) 81'; Capan (yellow card) 90+5'	Report	(yellow card) 62' Bosančić; 70' Guzina	Stadium: Rujevica; Attendance: Behind closed doors Referee: Fran Jović (Zagreb)

12 September 2020 4	Osijek	3–0	Rijeka	Osijek
17:55 CEST (UTC+02:00)	Jugović 5'; Bočkaj 38'; Erceg (yellow card) 43'; Miérez 75'; Pilj (yellow card) 77'	Report	(red card) 37' Arsenić; (yellow card) 45' Tomečak; (yellow card) 57' Gnezda Čerin; (yellow card) 61' Andrijašević; (yellow card) 73' Čolak	Stadium: Gradski Vrt; Attendance: Behind closed doors Referee: Marko Matoc (Zaprešić)

4 October 2020 7	Rijeka	2–0	Slaven Belupo	Rijeka
19:05 CEST (UTC+02:00)	Tomečak (yellow card) 45+1'; Andrijašević 69'; Štefulj (yellow card) 76'; Kulenović 90+2' (pen.)	Report	(yellow card) 55' Goda; (yellow card) 76' Prce	Stadium: Rujevica; Attendance: 2,275; Referee: Ivan Vučković (Zagreb)

17 October 2020 8	Rijeka	2–1	Varaždin	Rijeka
17:05 CEST (UTC+02:00)	Štefulj (yellow card) 12'; Stolnik 20' (o.g.); Kulenović 36'; Gnezda Čerin (yellow card) 60'; Lepinjica (yellow card) 90+2'	Report	(yellow card) 14' Benko; 17' (yellow card) 90' Obregón; (yellow card) 45+2' Stolnik; (yellow card) 71' Urata; (yellow card) 90+5' Kolarić	Stadium: Rujevica; Attendance: 2,072; Referee: Igor Pajač (Sveti Ivan Zelina)

1 November 2020 10	Šibenik	2–0	Rijeka	Šibenik
15:00 CET (UTC+01:00)	Bulat 12'; Kvesić (yellow card) 40'; Ćurić (yellow card) 44'; Sahiti 74' (yellow card) 90+3'	Report	(yellow card) 38' Tomečak; (yellow card) 40' (yellow-red card) 40' Velkovski; (yellow card) 45+1' Kulenović; (yellow card) 75' Lončar; (yellow card) 90+2' Smolčić	Stadium: Šubićevac; Attendance: Behind closed doors Referee: Fran Jović (Zagreb)

8 November 2020 11	Rijeka	1–0	Lokomotiva	Rijeka
17:05 CET (UTC+01:00)	Murić 17' (pen.); Lončar (yellow card) 71'	Report	(yellow card) 16' Pivarić	Stadium: Rujevica; Attendance: Behind closed doors Referee: Zdenko Lovrić

29 November 2020 13	Rijeka	1–1	Osijek	Rijeka
15:00 CET (UTC+01:00)	Pavičić (yellow card) 16' (yellow-red card) 60'; Andrijašević 64'	Report	(yellow card) 13' Vuković; (yellow card) 37' Igor Silva; (yellow card) 60' Miérez; 83' Bočkaj	Stadium: Rujevica; Attendance: Behind closed doors Referee: Fran Jović (Zagreb)

6 December 2020 14	Hajduk Split	1–2	Rijeka	Split
17:05 CET (UTC+01:00)	Caktaš 10' (pen.) (yellow card) 61'; Simić (yellow card) 48'; Dolček (yellow card) 85'	Report	40' Lončar; 70' Menalo; (yellow card) 90+1' Nevistić	Stadium: Poljud; Attendance: Behind closed doors Referee: Damir Batinić (Osijek)

13 December 2020 15	Rijeka	2–2	Dinamo Zagreb	Rijeka
17:05 CET (UTC+01:00)	Smolčić (yellow card) 7'; Galović 28' (yellow card) 44'; Menalo 35'; Murić (yellow card) 51'; Capan (yellow card) 51'; Tomečak (yellow card) 80'	Report	1' Ivanušec; (yellow card) 44' Gavranović; 82' Lauritsen	Stadium: Rujevica; Attendance: Behind closed doors Referee: Mario Zebec (Cestica)

19 January 2021 6	Dinamo Zagreb	0–2	Rijeka	Zagreb
18:05 CET (UTC+01:00)	Ivanušec (yellow card) 26'; Petković (penalty missed) 53'; Leovac (yellow card) 59'	Report	(yellow card) 22' Galović; (yellow card) 58' Štefulj; 66' Lončar; 71' Andrijašević; (yellow card) 75' Smolčić; (yellow card) 89' Capan; (yellow card) 90+1' Pavičić	Stadium: Maksimir; Attendance: Behind closed doors Referee: Duje Strukan (Split)

23 January 2021 17	Varaždin	2–1	Rijeka	Varaždin
15:00 CET (UTC+01:00)	Urata 3' (yellow card) 58'; Horkaš (yellow card) 17'; Postonjski (yellow card) 31'; Obregón 33'; Đurasek (yellow card) 65'	Report	80' Kulenović	Stadium: Varteks; Attendance: Behind closed doors Referee: Ante Čuljak (Zagreb)

27 January 2021 12	Istra 1961	1–2	Rijeka	Pula
15:00 CET (UTC+01:00)	Ivančić (yellow card) 32'; Špoljarić 38'; Bosančić (yellow card) 40'	Report	29' 65' (pen.) Andrijašević; (red card) 82' Smolčić	Stadium: Aldo Drosina; Attendance: Behind closed doors Referee: Ivan Vučković (Zagreb)

31 January 2021 18	Rijeka	0–2	Gorica	Rijeka
17:05 CET (UTC+01:00)	Galović (yellow card) 81'; Capan (red card) 90+4'	Report	20' (o.g.) Andrijašević; 44' Lovrić; (yellow card) 48' Suk; (yellow card) 50' Dvorneković; (yellow card) 52' Babec; (yellow card) 84' Banić; (red card) 90+4' Moro	Stadium: Rujevica; Attendance: Behind closed doors Referee: Fran Jović (Zagreb)

3 February 2021 19	Rijeka	2–2	Šibenik	Rijeka
17:05 CET (UTC+01:00)	Pavičić 35'; Arsenić (yellow card) 48'; Galović (yellow card) 88'; Andrijašević 90+10' (pen.)	Report	27' Sahiti; 32' Jurić; (yellow card) 90+10' Todoroski	Stadium: Rujevica; Attendance: Behind closed doors Referee: Ivan Vučković (Zagreb)

6 February 2021 20	Lokomotiva	2–3	Rijeka	Zagreb
17:05 CET (UTC+01:00)	Kallaku 11'; Pivarić 56' (pen.); Cipetić (yellow card) 68' (yellow-red card) 70'	Report	(yellow card) 55' Nevistić; 71' (pen.) 90+1' (pen.) Murić; 90+3' Kulenović	Stadium: Kranjčevićeva; Attendance: Behind closed doors Referee: Damir Batinić (Osijek)

10 February 2021 5	Rijeka	0–1	Hajduk Split	Rijeka
18:05 CET (UTC+01:00)	Kulenović (yellow card) 59'; Vukčević (yellow card) 77'	Report	(yellow card) 86' Vušković; 90+4' Caktaš	Stadium: Rujevica; Attendance: Behind closed doors Referee: Dario Bel (Osijek)

14 February 2021 21	Rijeka	1–1	Istra 1961	Rijeka
15:00 CET (UTC+01:00)	Murić 8'; Pavičić (yellow card) 9'; Arsenić (yellow card) 26'; Mudražija (yellow card) 32'; Vukčević (yellow card) 78'; Lončar (yellow card) 90+3'	Report	6' Gržan; (yellow card) 16' Sergi González; (yellow card) 34' Tomašević; (yellow card) 46' Einar Galilea; (yellow card) 70' Bosančić; (yellow card) 86' Hujber; (yellow card) 90+4' Lučić	Stadium: Rujevica; Attendance: Behind closed doors Referee: Dario Kulušić (Šibenik)

17 February 2021 9	Gorica	0–0	Rijeka	Velika Gorica
17:00 CET (UTC+01:00)	Mitrović (yellow card) 12'; Krizmanić (yellow card) 40'; Doka (yellow card) 57'; Keita (yellow card) 86'	Report	(yellow card) 81' Mudražija; (yellow card) 89' Gnezda Čerin	Stadium: Radnik; Attendance: Behind closed doors Referee: Tihomir Pejin (Donji Miholjac)

21 February 2021 22	Osijek	2–0	Rijeka	Osijek
15:00 CET (UTC+01:00)	Miérez 25' 69'	Report	(yellow card) 90+2' Pavičić	Stadium: Gradski Vrt; Attendance: Behind closed doors Referee: Duje Strukan (Split)

27 February 2021 23	Rijeka	0–1	Hajduk Split	Rijeka
17:30 CET (UTC+01:00)	Yatéké (yellow card) 11'; Andrijašević (penalty missed) 90+6'	Report	72' Nayir	Stadium: Rujevica; Attendance: Behind closed doors Referee: Damir Batinić (Osijek)

7 March 2021 24	Dinamo Zagreb	2–0	Rijeka	Zagreb
17:30 CET (UTC+01:00)	Ivanušec 27'; Oršić 65'	Report	(yellow card) 64' Vukčević; (yellow card) 72' Andrijašević; (yellow card) 78' Drmić; (yellow card) 90' Galović	Stadium: Maksimir; Attendance: Behind closed doors Referee: Duje Strukan (Split)

12 March 2021 25	Rijeka	1–1	Slaven Belupo	Rijeka
18:00 CET (UTC+01:00)	Lončar (yellow card) 34'; Pavičić (yellow card) 36'; Galešić (yellow card) 49'; Andrijašević 52'; Capan (yellow card) 68'; Gnezda Čerin (yellow card) 85'	Report	(yellow card) 32' Paracki; 76' van Bruggen	Stadium: Rujevica; Attendance: Behind closed doors Referee: Tihomir Pejin (Donji Miholjac)

17 March 2021 16	Slaven Belupo	1–3	Rijeka	Koprivnica
17:00 CET (UTC+01:00)	Glavčić 23' van Bruggen (yellow card) 54'	Report	69' Drmić; 74' Menalo; 81' Galović	Stadium: Gradski; Attendance: Behind closed doors Referee: Tihomir Pejin (Donji Miholjac)

21 March 2021 26	Rijeka	2–0	Varaždin	Rijeka
15:00 CET (UTC+01:00)	Galović 22' 35'; Capan (yellow card) 43'	Report		Stadium: Rujevica; Attendance: Behind closed doors Referee: Igor Pajač (Sveti Ivan Zelina)

3 April 2021 27	Gorica	3–4	Rijeka	Velika Gorica
20:00 CEST (UTC+02:00)	Mitrović 73'; Nimely (yellow card) 77' (yellow-red card) 90+1'; Mudrinski 83'; Galović 85' (o.g.); Jovičić (yellow card) 89'	Report	10' Andrijašević; 13' Drmić; (yellow card) 48' Štefulj; 50' Murić; 64' Gnezda Čerin; (yellow card) 74' Andrijašević; (yellow card) 85' Lončar	Stadium: Radnik; Attendance: Behind closed doors Referee: Duje Strukan (Split)

10 April 2021 28	Šibenik	0–1	Rijeka	Šibenik
19:05 CEST (UTC+02:00)	Bilić (yellow card) 40'; Ćurić (yellow card) 53'	Report	72' Drmić; (yellow card) 83' Pavičić	Stadium: Šubićevac; Attendance: Behind closed doors Referee: Tihomir Pejin (Donji Miholjac)

17 April 2021 29	Rijeka	3–0	Lokomotiva	Rijeka
19:05 CEST (UTC+02:00)	Murić 10'; Kulenović 12' 31'	Report	(yellow card) 75' Marić	Stadium: Rujevica; Attendance: Behind closed doors Referee: Duje Strukan (Split)

21 April 2021 30	Istra 1961	1–2	Rijeka	Pula
18:05 CEST (UTC+02:00)	Galilea 44'	Report	20' Murić; (yellow card) 32' Gnezda Čerin; 36' Kulenović	Stadium: Aldo Drosina; Attendance: Behind closed doors Referee: Dario Bel (Osijek)

25 April 2021 31	Rijeka	0–0	Osijek	Rijeka
17:00 CEST (UTC+02:00)	Capan (yellow card) 26'; Andrijašević (yellow card) 46'; Murić (penalty missed) 58' (yellow card) 85'; S. Lončar (yellow card) 61'; Smolčić (yellow card) 79'	Report	(yellow card) 14' Erceg; (yellow card) 59' Jugović; (yellow card) 75' (yellow-red card) 90+3' D. Lončar; (yellow card) 78' Santini; (yellow card) 80' Škorić	Stadium: Rujevica; Attendance: Behind closed doors Referee: Fran Jović (Zagreb)

1 May 2021 32	Hajduk Split	3–2	Rijeka	Split
20:00 CEST (UTC+02:00)	Biuk 14'; Štefulj (yellow card) 30' 45' (o.g.); Kačaniklić 47'; Livaja (yellow card) 84'; Jurić (yellow card) 89'	Report	31' Drmić; 65' Andrijašević	Stadium: Poljud; Attendance: Behind closed doors Referee: Marko Matoc (Zaprešić)

9 May 2021 33	Rijeka	1–5	Dinamo Zagreb	Rijeka
19:00 CEST (UTC+02:00)	Menalo 1'; Murić (yellow card) 59'; Capan (yellow card) 79'	Report	43' (o.g.) Galović; 48' (yellow card) 57' Mišić; 49' (o.g.) Capan; 64' Oršić; 88' (o.g.) Vukčević	Stadium: Rujevica; Attendance: Behind closed doors Referee: Duje Strukan (Split)

12 May 2021 34	Slaven Belupo	0–2	Rijeka	Koprivnica
16:00 CEST (UTC+02:00)	Mlinar (yellow card) 54'	Report	40' Andrijašević; (yellow card) 55' Menalo; 69' (pen.) Drmić	Stadium: Gradski; Attendance: Behind closed doors Referee: Fran Jović (Zagreb)

16 May 2021 35	Varaždin	2–3	Rijeka	Varaždin
15:00 CEST (UTC+02:00)	Obregón (yellow card) 19' (goal) 34'; Novoselec 84'	Report	(yellow card) 53' Lončar; 62' Menalo; 67' Capan; 79' Drmić	Stadium: Varteks; Attendance: Behind closed doors Referee: Igor Pajač (Sveti Ivan Zelina)

22 May 2021 36	Rijeka	2–1	Gorica	Rijeka
17:00 CEST (UTC+02:00)	Andrijašević 10'; Vukčević (yellow card) 58'; Menalo 79'; Pavičić (yellow card) 85'	Report	19' (yellow card) 34' Babec; (yellow card) 27' Steenvoorden; (yellow card) 82' Krizmanić; (yellow card) 85' Jovičić; (yellow card) 86' Doka	Stadium: Rujevica; Attendance: Behind closed doors Referee: Dario Bel (Osijek)

Source: Croatian Football Federation

=== Croatian Cup ===
7 October 2020 R1	Dilj	0–6	Rijeka	Vinkovci
15:00 CEST (UTC+02:00)	Radić (yellow card) 62'	Report	Turčin 30'; Menalo 33' 55'; Pavičić 37'; Hodža 68'; Ilinković 77'	Stadium: NK Dilj; Attendance: 150; Referee: Ivan Matić

16 December 2020 R2	Varaždin	1–2	Rijeka	Varaždin
16:00 CET (UTC+01:00)	Posavec 39' (yellow card) 77'; Stolnik (yellow card) 41'; Đurasek (yellow card) 45+2'; Zelenika (yellow card) 85'	Report	Lončar (yellow card) 60'; Galović 78'; Štefulj (yellow card) 87'; Menalo 90+2'	Stadium: Varteks; Attendance: Behind closed doors Referee: Zdenko Lovrić (Đakovo)

3 March 2021 QF	Osijek	1–2	Rijeka	Osijek
14:30 CET (UTC+01:00)	Škorić 14'; Miérez (penalty missed) 35'; Jurčević (yellow card) 70'; Silva (yellow card) 90+5'	Report	Murić 7' 71' (pen.); Vukčević (yellow card) 34'; Gnezda Čerin (yellow card) 60'; Menalo (yellow card) 90'	Stadium: Gradski Vrt; Attendance: Behind closed doors Referee: Mario Zebec (Cestica)

14 April 2021 SF	Istra 1961	3–2	Rijeka	Pula
18:00 CEST (UTC+02:00)	Šutalo 7'; Hara 22', (yellow card) 68'; Guzina 44', (yellow card) 70'; Galilea (yellow card) 69'; Lučić (yellow card) 90+3'	Report	Menalo (yellow card) 18'; Drmić 52'; Velkovski 52'; Lončar (yellow card) 66'; Murić (yellow card) 66' (goal) 72' (pen.)	Stadium: Aldo Drosina; Attendance: Behind closed doors Referee: Duje Strukan (Split)

Source: Croatian Football Federation

=== UEFA Europa League ===
24 September 2020 QR3	Rijeka (Croatia)	2–0 (a.e.t.)	(Ukraine) Kolos Kovalivka	Rijeka, Croatia
20:45 CEST (UTC+02:00)	Escoval 102'; Raspopović (yellow card) 105'; Kulenović (yellow card) 105+2'; Štefulj (yellow card) 107'; Andrijašević 115'; Lepinjica (yellow card) 120+2'	Report	Kravchenko (yellow card) 3'; Zadoya (yellow card) 37'; Kostyshyn (yellow card) 52'; Bohdanov (yellow card) 105+3'	Stadium: Rujevica; Attendance: Behind closed doors Referee: Tiago Martins (Portugal)

1 October 2020 PO	Copenhagen (Denmark)	0–1	(Croatia) Rijeka	Copenhagen, Denmark
20:00 CEST (UTC+02:00)	Nelsson (yellow card) 30'; Ankersen (yellow card) 59'; Sigurðsson (yellow card) 62'; Zeca (yellow card) 90+2'	Report	Ankersen 20' (o.g.); Capan (yellow card) 22'; Kulenović (yellow card) 62'; Gnezda Čerin (yellow card) 79'; Raspopović (yellow card) 90+4'	Stadium: Parken; Attendance: Behind closed doors Referee: Chris Kavanagh (England)

22 October 2020 GS	Rijeka (Croatia)	0–1	(Spain) Real Sociedad	Rijeka, Croatia
18:55 CEST (UTC+02:00)	Andrijašević (yellow card) 1'; Pavičić (yellow card) 36'; Capan (yellow card) 90'; Lepinjica (yellow card) 90+7'	Report	Merino (yellow card) 90'; Bautista 90+3'	Stadium: Stadion Rujevica; Attendance: 2,089; Referee: Bartosz Frankowski (Poland)

29 October 2020 GS	AZ (Netherlands)	4–1	(Croatia) Rijeka	Alkmaar, Netherlands
21:00 CET (UTC+01:00)	Koopmeiners 6' (pen.) (yellow card) 17'; Guðmundsson 20' 60' (yellow card) 31'; Karlsson 51'	Report	Kulenović (yellow card) 13' (goal) 72'; Menalo (yellow card) 34'; Lepinjica (yellow card) 86'	Stadium: AFAS Stadion; Attendance: 0 Referee: Sergey Ivanov (Russia)

5 November 2020 GS	Rijeka (Croatia)	1–2	(Italy) Napoli	Rijeka, Croatia
18:55 CET (UTC+01:00)	Murić 13'; Smolčić (yellow card) 30'; Braut (yellow card) 44'	Report	Politano (yellow card) 22'; Demme 43'; Koulibaly (yellow card) 45+2'; Braut 62' (o.g.)	Stadium: Stadion Rujevica; Attendance: 0 Referee: Mattias Gestranius (Finland)

26 November 2020 GS	Napoli (Italy)	2–0	(Croatia) Rijeka	Naples, Italy
21:00 CET (UTC+01:00)	Anastasio 41' (o.g.); Lozano 75'	Report	Anastasio (yellow card) 74'	Stadium: Stadio San Paolo; Attendance: 0 Referee: Halis Özkahya (Turkey)

3 December 2020 GS	Real Sociedad (Spain)	2–2	(Croatia) Rijeka	San Sebastián, Spain
21:00 CET (UTC+01:00)	Merino (yellow card) 23'; Bautista 69'; Monreal 79'	Report	Velkovski 38'; Andrijašević (yellow card) 41'; Halilović (yellow card) 68'; Lončar 73'	Stadium: Anoeta Stadium; Attendance: 0 Referee: João Pinheiro (Portugal)

10 December 2020 GS	Rijeka (Croatia)	2–1	(Netherlands) AZ	Rijeka, Croatia
18:55 CET (UTC+01:00)	Menalo (yellow card) 28' (goal) 52'; Capan (yellow card) 38'; Lončar (yellow card) 82'; Tomečak 90+3'	Report	Wijndal (yellow card) 38' (goal) 57'; Midtsjø (yellow card) 45+1'; Karlsson (red card) 81'; Stengs (yellow card) 83'	Stadium: Stadion Rujevica; Attendance: 0 Referee: Sergei Karasev (Russia)

Source: uefa.com

=== Friendlies ===
==== Mid-season ====
8 January 2021 Friendly	Rijeka (Croatia)	0–1	(Hungary) Fehérvár	Umag, Croatia
15:00 CET (UTC+01:00)		Report	Bamgboye 65'	Stadium: Stella Maris Sports Center; Attendance: Behind closed doors Referee: Alen Halilović

13 January 2021 Friendly	Rijeka (Croatia)	3–0	(Slovenia) Gorica	Umag, Croatia
14:45 CET (UTC+01:00)	Menalo 22'; Andrijašević 45' (pen.); Murić 52' (pen.)	Report	Kavčič (red card) 51'	Stadium: Stella Maris Sports Center; Attendance: Behind closed doors Referee: Mateo Čalić (Marčana)

15 January 2021 Friendly	Rijeka (Croatia)	4–2	(Hungary) Budafoki	Umag, Croatia
14:30 CET (UTC+01:00)	Braut 12' (yellow card) 25'; Kulenović 16'; Kulenović 26'; Galović (yellow card) 71'; Murić 80'	Report	Romić (yellow card) 24'; Zsóri 70' 89'	Stadium: Stella Maris Sports Center; Attendance: Behind closed doors Referee: Marin Vidulin (Kanfanar)

==== On-season ====
27 March 2021 Friendly	Rijeka (Croatia)	0–3	(Slovenia) Koper	Umag, Croatia
16:00 CET (UTC+01:00)		Report	Spinelli 50'; Jelić Balta 68'; Stevanović 86'	Stadium: Stella Maris Sports Center; Attendance: Behind closed doors

== Player seasonal records ==
Updated 23 May 2021. Competitive matches only.

=== Goals ===
Rank	Name	League	Europe	Cup	Supercup	Total
1	(Croatia) Franko Andrijašević	13	1	–	–	14
2	(Croatia) Robert Murić	8	1	3	–	12
3	(Bosnia and Herzegovina) Luka Menalo	6	1	3	–	10
4	(Croatia) Sandro Kulenović	7	1	–	–	8
5	(Switzerland) Josip Drmić	6	–	1	–	7
6	(Croatia) Nino Galović	4	–	1	–	5
7	(Bosnia and Herzegovina) Stjepan Lončar	2	1	–	–	3
8	(Croatia) Domagoj Pavičić	1	–	1	–	2
9	(Croatia) Luka Capan	1	–	–	–	1
9	(Slovenia) Adam Gnezda Čerin	1	–	–	–	1
9	(Central African Republic) Sterling Yatéké	1	–	–	–	1
9	(Portugal) João Escoval	–	1	–	–	1
9	(Croatia) Ivan Tomečak	–	1	–	–	1
9	(North Macedonia) Darko Velkovski	–	1	–	–	1
9	(Croatia) Veldin Hodža	–	–	1	–	1
9	(Bosnia and Herzegovina) Silvio Ilinković	–	–	1	–	1
9	(Croatia) Tomislav Turčin	–	–	1	–	1
Own goals		1	1	–	–	2
TOTALS		51	9	12	0	72

Source: Competitive matches

=== Clean sheets ===
Rank	Name	League	Europe	Cup	Supercup	Total
1	(Croatia) Ivan Nevistić	9	2	–	–	11
2	(Croatia) Antonio Frigan	–	–	1	–	1
2	(Nigeria) David Nwolokor	–	–	1	–	1
TOTALS		9	2	2	0	13

Source: Competitive matches

=== Disciplinary record ===
Number	Position	Player	1. HNL			Europe			Croatian Cup			Supercup			Total		
Number	Position	Player	Booked	(yellow card) (yellow-red card)	Sent off (straight red)	Booked	(yellow card) (yellow-red card)	Sent off (straight red)	Booked	(yellow card) (yellow-red card)	Sent off (straight red)	Booked	(yellow card) (yellow-red card)	Sent off (straight red)	Booked	(yellow card) (yellow-red card)	Sent off (straight red)
2	DF	(Croatia) Filip Braut	0	0	0	1	0	0	0	0	0	0	0	0	1	0	0
3	DF	(Croatia) Niko Galešić	1	0	0	0	0	0	0	0	0	0	0	0	1	0	0
4	DF	(Croatia) Nino Galović	6	0	0	0	0	0	0	0	0	0	0	0	6	0	0
6	MF	(Croatia) Ivan Lepinjica	2	0	0	3	0	0	0	0	0	0	0	0	5	0	0
7	MF	(Croatia) Robert Murić	3	0	0	0	0	0	1	0	0	0	0	0	4	0	0
8	MF	(Croatia) Tibor Halilović	0	0	0	1	0	0	0	0	0	0	0	0	1	0	0
10	MF	(Croatia) Domagoj Pavičić	6	1	0	1	0	0	0	0	0	0	0	0	7	1	0
11	FW	(Central African Republic) Sterling Yatéké	2	0	0	0	0	0	0	0	0	0	0	0	2	0	0
12	DF	(Montenegro) Andrija Vukčević	4	0	0	0	0	0	1	0	0	0	0	0	5	0	0
14	DF	(North Macedonia) Darko Velkovski	0	1	0	0	0	0	1	0	0	0	0	0	1	1	0
15	DF	(Croatia) Zoran Arsenić	2	0	1	0	0	0	0	0	0	0	0	0	2	0	1
16	MF	(Slovenia) Adam Gnezda Čerin	6	0	0	1	0	0	1	0	0	0	0	0	8	0	0
17	FW	(Croatia) Antonio Čolak	1	0	0	0	0	0	0	0	0	0	0	0	1	0	0
17	MF	(Bosnia and Herzegovina) Luka Menalo	1	0	0	2	0	0	2	0	0	0	0	0	5	0	0
18	FW	(Switzerland) Josip Drmić	1	0	0	0	0	0	0	0	0	0	0	0	1	0	0
19	MF	(Croatia) Franko Andrijašević	4	0	0	2	0	0	0	0	0	0	0	0	6	0	0
20	DF	(Montenegro) Momčilo Raspopović	1	0	0	2	0	0	0	0	0	0	0	0	3	0	0
20	MF	(Croatia) Robert Mudražija	2	0	0	0	0	0	0	0	0	0	0	0	2	0	0
23	DF	(Italy) Armando Anastasio	0	0	0	1	0	0	0	0	0	0	0	0	1	0	0
24	DF	(Croatia) Daniel Štefulj	5	0	0	1	0	0	1	0	0	0	0	0	7	0	0
27	DF	(Croatia) Ivan Tomečak	4	0	0	0	0	0	0	0	0	0	0	0	4	0	0
31	MF	(Croatia) Luka Capan	7	0	1	3	0	0	0	0	0	0	0	0	10	0	1
33	GK	(Croatia) Ivan Nevistić	2	0	0	0	0	0	0	0	0	0	0	0	2	0	0
36	DF	(Croatia) Hrvoje Smolčić	4	0	1	1	0	0	0	0	0	0	0	0	5	0	1
44	MF	(Bosnia and Herzegovina) Stjepan Lončar	8	0	0	1	0	0	2	0	0	0	0	0	11	0	0
99	FW	(Croatia) Sandro Kulenović	2	0	0	3	0	0	0	0	0	0	0	0	5	0	0
TOTALS			74	2	3	23	0	0	9	0	0	0	0	0	106	2	3

Source: nk-rijeka.hr

=== Appearances and goals ===
Number	Position	Player	Apps	Goals	Apps	Goals	Apps	Goals	Apps	Goals	Apps	Goals
Number	Position	Player	Total		1. HNL (Note: First number represents appearances in starting eleven, while the second number indicates a substitute appearance.)		Europa League		Croatian Cup		Supercup	
1	GK	(Nigeria) David Nwolokor	2	0	0+0	0	0+0	0	2+0	0	0+0	0
2	DF	(Croatia) Filip Braut	11	0	4+3	0	1+1	0	1+1	0	0+0	0
3	DF	(Croatia) Niko Galešić	8	0	6+2	0	0+0	0	0+0	0	0+0	0
4	DF	(Croatia) Nino Galović	38	5	31+0	4	3+0	0	4+0	1	0+0	0
6	MF	(Croatia) Ivan Lepinjica	20	0	4+11	0	0+4	0	1+0	0	0+0	0
7	MF	(Croatia) Robert Murić	38	12	18+12	8	5+0	1	3+0	3	0+0	0
8	MF	(Croatia) Tibor Halilović	9	0	5+0	0	2+1	0	0+1	0	0+0	0
8	MF	(Croatia) Adrian Liber	7	0	0+6	0	0+0	0	0+1	0	0+0	0
9	FW	(North Macedonia) Milan Ristovski	3	0	0+3	0	0+0	0	0+0	0	0+0	0
10	MF	(Croatia) Domagoj Pavičić	36	2	14+15	1	4+2	0	1+0	1	0+0	0
11	FW	(Central African Republic) Sterling Yatéké	25	1	3+16	1	0+5	0	0+1	0	0+0	0
12	DF	(Montenegro) Andrija Vukčević	13	0	9+3	0	0+0	0	1+0	0	0+0	0
13	DF	(Croatia) Ennio Travaglia	1	0	0+0	0	0+0	0	1+0	0	0+0	0
14	DF	(North Macedonia) Darko Velkovski	16	1	7+1	0	7+0	1	0+1	0	0+0	0
15	DF	(Croatia) Zoran Arsenić	10	0	7+2	0	0+0	0	0+1	0	0+0	0
16	MF	(Slovenia) Adam Gnezda Čerin	36	1	26+2	1	5+0	0	3+0	0	0+0	0
17	FW	(Croatia) Antonio Čolak	4	0	4+0	0	0+0	0	0+0	0	0+0	0
17	MF	(Bosnia and Herzegovina) Luka Menalo	36	10	20+8	6	4+0	1	4+0	3	0+0	0
18	FW	(Switzerland) Josip Drmić	18	7	11+5	6	0+0	0	2+0	1	0+0	0
18	DF	(Croatia) Noa Zuliani	1	0	0+0	0	0+0	0	0+1	0	0+0	0
19	MF	(Croatia) Franko Andrijašević	40	14	30+0	13	7+0	1	3+0	0	0+0	0
20	MF	(Croatia) Robert Mudražija	18	0	8+9	0	0+0	0	0+1	0	0+0	0
20	DF	(Montenegro) Momčilo Raspopović	9	0	1+4	0	0+4	0	0+0	0	0+0	0
21	FW	(Croatia) Tomislav Turčin	2	1	0+1	0	0+0	0	1+0	1	0+0	0
22	GK	(Croatia) Antonio Frigan	1	0	0+0	0	0+0	0	0+1	0	0+0	0
22	DF	(Croatia) Roko Jurišić	2	0	1+1	0	0+0	0	0+0	0	0+0	0
23	DF	(Italy) Armando Anastasio	4	0	1+0	0	1+2	0	0+0	0	0+0	0
24	DF	(Croatia) Daniel Štefulj	44	0	23+9	0	7+1	0	3+1	0	0+0	0
25	MF	(Bosnia and Herzegovina) Silvio Ilinković	1	1	0+0	0	0+0	0	0+1	1	0+0	0
25	GK	(Croatia) Ivor Pandur	2	0	2+0	0	0+0	0	0+0	0	0+0	0
26	DF	(Portugal) João Escoval	26	1	14+5	0	3+3	1	1+0	0	0+0	0
27	DF	(Croatia) Ivan Tomečak	43	1	30+2	0	8+0	1	3+0	0	0+0	0
30	MF	(Spain) Dani Iglesias	2	0	0+2	0	0+0	0	0+0	0	0+0	0
31	MF	(Croatia) Luka Capan	31	1	23+0	1	4+1	0	3+0	0	0+0	0
32	GK	(Croatia) Andrej Prskalo	1	0	1+0	0	0+0	0	0+0	0	0+0	0
33	GK	(Croatia) Ivan Nevistić	43	0	33+0	0	8+0	0	2+0	0	0+0	0
36	DF	(Croatia) Hrvoje Smolčić	24	0	15+1	0	7+0	0	1+0	0	0+0	0
44	MF	(Bosnia and Herzegovina) Stjepan Lončar	42	3	29+2	2	8+0	1	3+0	0	0+0	0
54	MF	(Croatia) Veldin Hodža	2	1	0+0	0	0+1	0	0+1	1	0+0	0
60	FW	(Croatia) Matija Frigan	1	0	0+0	0	0+1	0	0+0	0	0+0	0
71	MF	(Croatia) Dominik Simčić	1	0	0+0	0	0+0	0	0+1	0	0+0	0
99	FW	(Croatia) Sandro Kulenović	38	8	16+13	7	4+2	1	2+1	0	0+0	0

Source: nk-rijeka.hr

=== Suspensions ===
Date Incurred	Competition	Player	Games Missed	Reason
12 Sep 2020	1. HNL	(Croatia) Zoran Arsenić	1	Sent off (straight red)
17 Oct 2020	1. HNL	(Slovenia) Adam Gnezda Čerin	1	Booked
29 Oct 2020	UEL	(Croatia) Sandro Kulenović	1	Booked
29 Oct 2020	UEL	(Croatia) Ivan Lepinjica	1	Booked
1 Nov 2020	1. HNL	(Croatia) Ivan Tomečak	1	Booked
1 Nov 2020	1. HNL	(North Macedonia) Darko Velkovski	1	(yellow card) (yellow-red card)
8 Nov 2020	1. HNL	(Bosnia and Herzegovina) Stjepan Lončar	1	Booked
29 Nov 2020	1. HNL	(Croatia) Domagoj Pavičić	1	(yellow card) (yellow-red card)
10 Dec 2020	UEL	(Croatia) Luka Capan	1	Booked
19 Jan 2021	1. HNL	(Croatia) Luka Capan	1	Booked
19 Jan 2021	1. HNL	(Croatia) Nino Galović	1	Booked
19 Jan 2021	1. HNL	(Croatia) Hrvoje Smolčić	1	Booked
19 Jan 2021	1. HNL	(Croatia) Daniel Štefulj	1	Booked
27 Jan 2021	1. HNL	(Croatia) Hrvoje Smolčić	1	Sent off (straight red)
31 Jan 2021	1. HNL	(Croatia) Luka Capan	1	Sent off (straight red)
21 Feb 2021	1. HNL	(Croatia) Domagoj Pavičić	1	Booked
7 Mar 2021	1. HNL	(Croatia) Nino Galović	1	Booked
7 Mar 2021	1. HNL	(Montenegro) Andrija Vukčević	1	Booked
3 Apr 2021	1. HNL	(Croatia) Franko Andrijašević	1	Booked
3 Apr 2021	1. HNL	(Bosnia and Herzegovina) Stjepan Lončar	1	Booked
21 Apr 2021	1. HNL	(Slovenia) Adam Gnezda Čerin	1	Booked
25 Apr 2021	1. HNL	(Croatia) Luka Capan	1	Booked
9 May 2021	1. HNL	(Croatia) Robert Murić	1	Booked
22 May 2021	1. HNL	(Croatia) Domagoj Pavičić	1	Booked

=== Penalties ===
For
Date	Competition	Player	Opposition	Scored?
29 Aug 2020	1. HNL	(Croatia) Franko Andrijašević	Istra 1961	✓
4 Oct 2020	1. HNL	(Croatia) Sandro Kulenović	Slaven Belupo	✓
8 Nov 2020	1. HNL	(Croatia) Robert Murić	Lokomotiva	✓
27 Jan 2021	1. HNL	(Croatia) Franko Andrijašević	Istra 1961	✓
3 Feb 2021	1. HNL	(Croatia) Franko Andrijašević	Šibenik	✓
6 Feb 2021	1. HNL	(Croatia) Robert Murić	Lokomotiva	✓
6 Feb 2021	1. HNL	(Croatia) Robert Murić	Lokomotiva	✓
27 Feb 2021	1. HNL	(Croatia) Franko Andrijašević	Hajduk Split	✗
3 Mar 2021	Cup	(Croatia) Robert Murić	Osijek	✓
14 Apr 2021	Cup	(Croatia) Robert Murić	Istra 1961	✓
25 Apr 2021	1. HNL	(Croatia) Robert Murić	Osijek	✗
12 May 2021	1. HNL	(Switzerland) Josip Drmić	Slaven Belupo	✓
Against
Date	Competition	Goalkeeper	Opposition	Scored?
29 Oct 2020	UEL	(Croatia) Ivan Nevistić	AZ	✓
6 Dec 2020	1. HNL	(Croatia) Ivan Nevistić	Hajduk Split	✓
19 Jan 2021	1. HNL	(Croatia) Ivan Nevistić	Dinamo Zagreb	✗
6 Feb 2021	1. HNL	(Croatia) Ivan Nevistić	Lokomotiva	✓
3 Mar 2021	Cup	(Croatia) Ivan Nevistić	Osijek	✗

=== Overview of statistics ===
Statistic	Overall	1. HNL	Croatian Cup	Europa League
Most appearances	Štefulj (44)	Nevistić (33)	Galović, Menalo & Štefulj (4)	Lončar, Nevistić, Štefulj & Tomečak (8)
Most starts	Nevistić (43)	Nevistić (33)	Galović & Menalo (4)	Lončar, Nevistić & Tomečak (8)
Most substitute appearances	Yatéké (22)	Yatéké (16)	14 players (1)	Yatéké (5)
Most minutes played	Nevistić (3,900)	Nevistić (2,970)	Galović (360)	Nevistić (750)
Top goalscorer	Andrijašević (14)	Andrijašević (13)	Menalo & Murić (3)	8 players (1)
Most assists	Murić (10)	Murić (8)	Andrijašević & Murić (2)	Andrijašević, Lončar & Menalo (2)
Most yellow cards	Lončar (11)	Lončar (8)	Lončar & Menalo (2)	Capan, Kulenović & Lepinjica (3)
Most red cards	5 players (1)	5 players (1)	–	–
Last updated: 28 June 2021.

== Transfers ==
=== In ===
Date	Pos.	Player	Moving from	Type	Fee	Ref.
9 Aug 2020	GK	(Croatia) Ivan Nevistić	(Croatia) Varaždin	Return from loan	—N/a	
9 Aug 2020	LB	(Croatia) Petar Mamić	(Croatia) Varaždin	Return from loan	—N/a	
9 Aug 2020	LW	(Croatia) Josip Mitrović	(Croatia) Inter Zaprešić	Return from loan	—N/a	
9 Aug 2020	LW	(Croatia) Denis Bušnja	(Croatia) Istra 1961	Return from loan	—N/a	
12 Aug 2020	LB	(Croatia) Ennio Travaglia	(Croatia) Orijent 1919	Transfer	Free	
26 Aug 2020	CM	(Slovenia) Adam Gnezda Čerin	(Germany) Nürnberg	Loan (until 30/6/2022; option to buy)	—N/a	
7 Sep 2020	CB	(Croatia) Zoran Arsenić	(Poland) Jagiellonia Białystok	Loan (until 30/6/2021; option to buy)	—N/a	
21 Sep 2020	CF	(Croatia) Sandro Kulenović	(Croatia) Dinamo Zagreb	Loan (until 15/6/2021; option to buy)	—N/a	
6 Oct 2020	LB	(Italy) Armando Anastasio	(Italy) Monza	Loan (until 30/6/2021)	—N/a	
6 Oct 2020	LW	(Bosnia and Herzegovina) Luka Menalo	(Croatia) Dinamo Zagreb	Loan (until 15/6/2021; option to buy)	—N/a	
18 Jan 2021	CM	(Croatia) Adrian Liber	(Croatia) Orijent 1919	Return from loan	—N/a	
22 Jan 2021	LB	(Croatia) Roko Jurišić	(Croatia) Dinamo Zagreb II	Transfer	Free	
25 Jan 2021	CB	(Bosnia and Herzegovina) Jasmin Čeliković	(Slovakia) Sereď	Return from loan	—N/a	
26 Jan 2021	LB	(Croatia) Daniel Štefulj	(Croatia) Dinamo Zagreb	Loan (until 15/6/2021)	—N/a	
27 Jan 2021	CM	(Croatia) Robert Mudražija	(Denmark) Copenhagen	Loan (until 30/6/2022)	—N/a	
29 Jan 2021	GK	(Croatia) Ivan Nevistić	(Croatia) Dinamo Zagreb	Loan (until 15/6/2021)	—N/a	
4 Feb 2021	LB	(Montenegro) Andrija Vukčević	(Belgium) Waasland-Beveren	Transfer	Free	
5 Feb 2021	CF	(Switzerland) Josip Drmić	(England) Norwich City	Loan (until 30/6/2021)	—N/a	

Source: Glasilo Hrvatskog nogometnog saveza

=== Out ===
Date	Pos.	Player	Moving to	Type	Fee	Ref.
3 Aug 2020	LW	(Austria) Alexander Gorgon	(Poland) Pogoń Szczecin	Transfer	Free	
11 Aug 2020	CB	(Croatia) Josip Mitrović	(Croatia) Gorica	Transfer	Free	
12 Aug 2020	LW	(Croatia) Denis Bušnja	(Slovakia) Sereď	Loan (until 30/6/2021)	—N/a	
1 Sep 2020	GK	(Croatia) Ivor Pandur	(Italy) Hellas Verona	Transfer	€900,000	
9 Sep 2020	CB	(Bosnia and Herzegovina) Jasmin Čeliković	(Slovakia) Sereď	Loan (until 15/6/2021)	—N/a	
11 Sep 2020	LB	(Croatia) Petar Mamić	(Poland) Raków Częstochowa	Transfer	Free	
15 Sep 2020	LW	(Croatia) Matej Vuk	(Croatia) Istra 1961	Loan (until 15/6/2021)	—N/a	
21 Sep 2020	LB	(Croatia) Antonio Čolak	(Greece) PAOK	Transfer	€3,000,000	
5 Oct 2020	RM	(Austria) Mario Pavelić	(Austria) Wolfsberger AC	Transfer	Free	
1 Jan 2021	RB	(Montenegro) Momčilo Raspopović	(Romania) Astra Giurgiu	Transfer	€200,000	
11 Jan 2021	DM	(Croatia) Tibor Halilović	(Netherlands) Heerenveen	Transfer	€1,500,000	
18 Jan 2021	LB	(Italy) Armando Anastasio	(Italy) Monza	End of loan	—N/a	
25 Jan 2021	LB	(Croatia) Daniel Štefulj	(Croatia) Dinamo Zagreb	Transfer	€1,000,000	
26 Jan 2021	CF	(North Macedonia) Milan Ristovski	(Slovakia) Spartak Trnava	Loan (until 15/6/2021; option to buy)	—N/a	
28 Jan 2021	GK	(Croatia) Ivan Nevistić	(Croatia) Dinamo Zagreb	Transfer	€3,000,000	
1 Feb 2021	AM	(Spain) Dani Iglesias	(Slovakia) Spartak Trnava	Loan (until 30/6/2021; option to buy)	—N/a	
8 Feb 2021	CB	(Bosnia and Herzegovina) Jasmin Čeliković	(Bosnia and Herzegovina) Željezničar	Loan (until 31/5/2021)	—N/a	
9 Feb 2021	CB	(Croatia) Marko Putnik	(Croatia) Orijent 1919	Loan (until 15/6/2021)	—N/a	
9 Feb 2021	DM	(Croatia) Veldin Hodža	(Croatia) Orijent 1919	Loan (until 15/6/2021)	—N/a	
15 Feb 2021	LB	(Croatia) Ennio Travaglia	(Bosnia and Herzegovina) Zrinjski Mostar	Transfer	Free	
15 Feb 2021	RW	(Croatia) Tomislav Turčin	(Croatia) Dinamo Zagreb II	Loan (until 30/6/2021)	—N/a	
23 Feb 2021	CB	(Croatia) Zoran Arsenić	(Poland) Jagiellonia Białystok	End of loan	—N/a	

Source: Glasilo Hrvatskog nogometnog saveza

Spending: ▼€0
Income: ▲€9,600,000
Expenditure: ▲€9,600,000
