= 2020 Croatian Football Cup final =

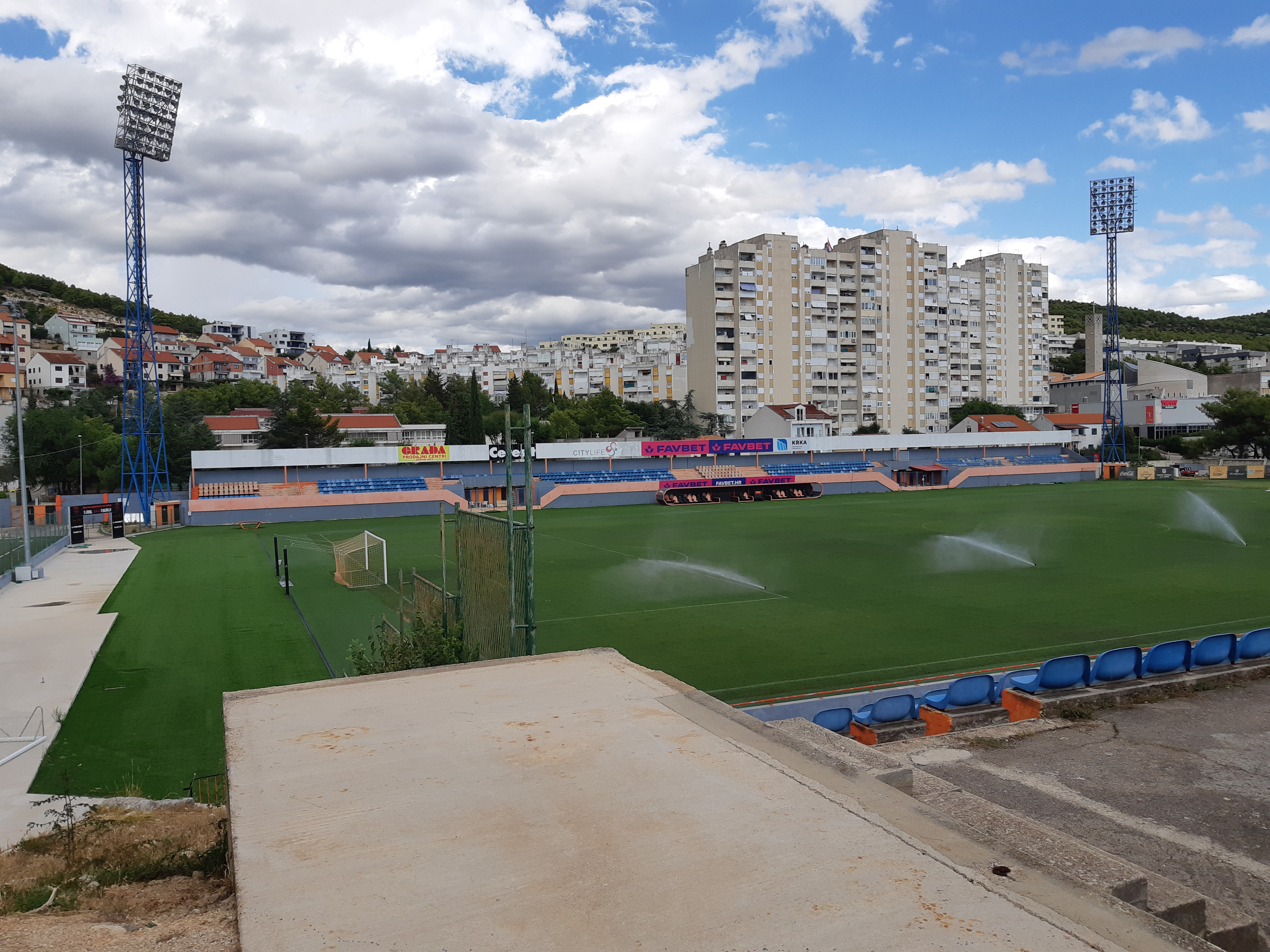
- Stadion Šubićevac in Šibenik hosted the final
- Event: 2019–20 Croatian Cup
Rijeka	Lokomotiva
Prva HNL	Prva HNL
1	0
- Date: 1 August 2020
- Venue: Stadion Šubićevac, Šibenik
- Referee: Tihomir Pejin (Donji Miholjac)
- Attendance: 0 (Note: The match was played behind closed doors due to the COVID-19 pandemic in Croatia.)

The 2020 Croatian Cup final between Rijeka and Lokomotiva was played on 1 August 2020 in Šibenik.

== Road to the final ==
Rijeka		Round	Lokomotiva	
Opponent	Result		Opponent	Result
Bye		Preliminary round	Bye	
Buje	11–0	First round	Oriolik	3–0
Varaždin	2–1	Second round	Vinogradar	3−0
Dinamo Zagreb	1–0	Quarter-finals	Šibenik	4–0
Osijek	3–2	Semi-finals	Slaven Belupo	3–1

== Match details ==
1 August 2020
20:30 CEST

Rijeka	1–0	Lokomotiva
Halilović 76'	Report

Stadion Šubićevac, Šibenik
Attendance: 0
Referee: Tihomir Pejin (Donji Miholjac)

Rijeka	Lokomotiva

Rijeka:
GK	25	(Croatia) Ivor Pandur
CB	14	(North Macedonia) Darko Velkovski	(yellow card) 74'
CB	4	(Croatia) Nino Galović
CB	26	(Portugal) João Escoval	(yellow card) 67'
RM	2	(Croatia) Filip Braut
CM	10	(Croatia) Domagoj Pavičić		(substituted off) 89'
CM	44	(Bosnia and Herzegovina) Stjepan Lončar
CM	8	(Croatia) Tibor Halilović
LM	24	(Croatia) Daniel Štefulj		(substituted off) 90+5'
AM	19	(Croatia) Franko Andrijašević (c)		(substituted off) 46'
CF	17	(Croatia) Antonio Čolak
Substitutes:
GK	1	(Nigeria) David Nwolokor
GK	32	(Croatia) Andrej Prskalo
DF	3	(Croatia) Niko Galešić
DF	27	(Croatia) Ivan Tomečak		(substituted on) 90+5'
DF	29	(Montenegro) Momčilo Raspopović
DF	31	(Croatia) Luka Capan		(substituted on) 89'
MF	6	(Croatia) Ivan Lepinjica	(yellow card) 80'	(substituted on) 46'
MF	40	(Bosnia and Herzegovina) Jasmin Čeliković
FW	7	(Croatia) Robert Murić
FW	11	(Central African Republic) Sterling Yateke
FW	30	(Spain) Dani Iglesias
Manager:
(Slovenia) Simon Rožman

GK	13	(Croatia) Ivo Grbić
RB	26	(Australia) Fran Karačić
CB	6	(Croatia) Dominik Kovačić
CB	20	(Croatia) Denis Kolinger (c)
LB	11	(Croatia) Ivan Čeliković	(yellow card) 82'	(substituted off) 85'
RM	8	(Croatia) Oliver Petrak		(substituted off) 77'
CM	16	(Albania) Jon Mersinaj		(substituted off) 78'
LM	18	(Albania) Enis Çokaj	(yellow card) 51'	(substituted off) 71'
AM	24	(Croatia) Marko Tolić
CF	22	(Kosovo) Lirim Kastrati
CF	7	(Albania) Myrto Uzuni
Substitutes:
GK	12	(Croatia) Krunoslav Hendija
DF	14	(Serbia) Nikola Pejović
DF	29	(Austria) Petar Gluhakovic
DF	3	(Bosnia and Herzegovina) Stipo Marković		(substituted on) 85'
MF	10	(Croatia) Sammir		(substituted on) 77'
MF	23	(Croatia) Kristijan Jakić		(substituted on) 71'
MF	28	(Croatia) Dino Halilović
MF	4	(Croatia) Frane Vojković
FW	15	(Croatia) Josip Majić
FW	17	(Albania) Indrit Tuci
FW	5	(Serbia) Đorđe Rakić
FW	9	(Croatia) Mario Budimir		(substituted on) 78'
Manager:
(Croatia) Goran Tomić

Assistant referees:
Goran Pataki (Đakovo)
Goran Perica (Šibenik)
Fourth official:
Marko Matoc (Zaprešić)
Video assistant referee:
Goran Gabrilo (Split)
Assistant video assistant referee:
Tomislav Petrović (Valpovo)

Match rules

- 90 minutes.
- 30 minutes of extra-time if necessary.
- Penalty shoot-out if scores still level.
- Eleven named substitutes.
- Maximum of five substitutions.
