= Hrvoje Smolčić =

Croatian footballer (born 2000)

Personal information
- Date of birth: 17 August 2000 (age 26)
- Place of birth: Gospić, Croatia
- Height: 1.85 m (6 ft 1 in)
- Position: Centre back

Team information
- Current team: Çorum
- Number: 6

Youth career
- 2008–2014: Gospić 91
- 2014–2019: Rijeka

Senior career*
Years	Team	Apps	(Gls)
2019–2022	Rijeka	68	(1)
2022–2026	Eintracht Frankfurt	20	(1)
2024–2025	→ LASK (loan)	24	(3)
2025–2026	→ Kocaelispor (loan)	26	(1)
2026–	Çorum	8	(0)

International career
2018–2019	Croatia U19	5	(0)
2019	Croatia U20	2	(0)
2021–2022	Croatia U21	6	(0)
- * Club domestic league appearances and goals as of 16 October 2026

Hrvoje Smolčić (born 17 August 2000) is a Croatian professional footballer who plays as a centre back for Süper Lig club Çorum in Turkey.

== Club career ==
After playing for the youth teams of Croatian club Rijeka, Smolčić made his professional debut for the club's first team on 17 March 2019, when he appeared as a starter in a 3–1 victory against Osijek. In the 2019–20 season, he played 24 league matches and won the Croatian Cup with his team, appearing in three cup matches, but missing the final against Lokomotiva Zagreb due to being suspended after receiving two yellow cards in the semi-final.

On 31 May 2022, it was announced that Smolčić will move to Bundesliga side Eintracht Frankfurt for the 2022–23 season, on a five-year deal until 2027.

On 24 June 2024, Smolčić was loaned by LASK in Austria.

On 6 September 2025, he was loaned by Kocaelispor in Turkey, with an option to buy.

== International career ==
On 14 August 2018, Smolčić played his first international game for the Croatian under-19 team, coming off the bench for Leon Kreković in a friendly match against Italy. After playing four more matches for the under-19 team and appearing in two matches for the under-20 squad, he debuted for the under-21 team on 8 October 2021 in a European Under-21 Championship qualifying match against Norway.

== Career statistics ==
As of match played 1 June 2025

Appearances and goals by club, season and competition
Club	Season	League			National cup (Note: Includes Croatian Cup, DFB-Pokal, Austrian Cup)		Europe		Other		Total	
Club	Season	Division	Apps	Goals	Apps	Goals	Apps	Goals	Apps	Goals	Apps	Goals
Rijeka	2018–19	Prva HNL	6	0	—		—		—		6	0
Rijeka	2019–20	Prva HNL	24	0	3	1	—		—		27	1
Rijeka	2020–21	Prva HNL	16	0	1	0	7 (Note: Appearances in UEFA Europa League)	0	—		24	0
Rijeka	2021–22	Prva HNL	22	1	3	0	3 (Note: Appearances in UEFA Europa Conference League)	0	—		28	1
Rijeka	Total		68	1	7	1	10	0	—		85	2
Eintracht Frankfurt	2022–23	Bundesliga	9	0	2	1	3 (Note: Appearances in UEFA Champions League)	0	0	0	14	1
Eintracht Frankfurt	2023–24	Bundesliga	11	1	1	0	6	0	—		18	1
Eintracht Frankfurt	Total		20	1	3	1	9	0	0	0	32	2
LASK (loan)	2024–25	Austrian Bundesliga	21	3	3	0	6 (Note: One appearance in UEFA Europa League, five appearances in UEFA Conference League)	0	—		30	3
Career total			109	5	13	2	25	0	—		147	7

== Personal life ==
Hrvoje's twin brother Ivan is also a professional footballer. The twins moved to HNK Rijeka Academy together in 2014.

== Honours ==
Rijeka

- Croatian Cup: 2018–19, 2019–20
