= 2015 Croatian Football Cup final =

- Event: 2014–15 Croatian Cup
Dinamo Zagreb	RNK Split
0	0
- Dinamo Zagreb won 4–2 on penalties
- Date: 20 May 2015
- Venue: Stadion Maksimir, Zagreb
- Man of the Match: Dario Rugašević (RNK Split)
- Referee: Ivan Bebek (Rijeka)
- Attendance: 11,124
- Weather: Cloudy

The 2015 Croatian Cup final was a one-legged affair played between Dinamo Zagreb and RNK Split. The final was played in Zagreb on 20 May 2015.

Dinamo Zagreb won the trophy after the penalty shoot-out. For the first time the final was played as a single game.

== Road to the final ==
Dinamo Zagreb		Round	RNK Split	
Opponent	Result		Opponent	Result
bye		Preliminary round	Croatia Grabrovnica	1–0
Ponikve	2–1	First round	Segesta	2–0
Opatija	4−2 (aet)	Second round	Osijek	2–0
Istra 1961	1–0	Quarter-finals	Zadar	1–0
Istra 1961	3–0	Quarter-finals	Zadar	4–1
Rijeka	2–1	Semi-finals	Hajduk Split	1–1
Rijeka	0–0	Semi-finals	Hajduk Split	1–0

== Match details ==
20 May 2015
20:00

Dinamo Zagreb	0–0 (a.e.t.)	RNK Split
	Report (in Croatian)
Penalties
Henríquez (penalty scored); Taravel (penalty scored); Pivarić (penalty scored); Machado (penalty scored)	4–2	(penalty scored) Barbarić; (penalty missed) Rog; (penalty missed) Blagojević; (penalty scored) Mršić

Stadion Maksimir, Zagreb
Attendance: 11,124
Referee: Ivan Bebek (Rijeka)

Dinamo Zagreb	RNK Split

DINAMO ZAGREB:
GK	1	(Croatia) Antonio Ježina
DF	5	(Croatia) Jozo Šimunović	(yellow card) 101'
DF	6	(Portugal) Ivo Pinto
DF	19	(Croatia) Josip Pivarić
DF	22	(Argentina) Leonardo Sigali		(substituted off) 52'
MF	8	(Croatia) Marko Pjaca
MF	10	(Portugal) Paulo Machado
MF	16	(North Macedonia) Arijan Ademi (c)	(yellow card) 45+2'
MF	24	(Croatia) Ante Ćorić		(substituted off) 65'
FW	2	(Algeria) El Arbi Hillel Soudani	(yellow card) 9'	(substituted off) 106'
FW	9	(Chile) Ángelo Henríquez
Substitutes:
DF	87	(France) Jérémy Taravel	(yellow card) 114'	(substituted on) 52'
FW	31	(Chile) Junior Fernándes		(substituted on) 65'
MF	18	(Croatia) Domagoj Pavičić		(substituted on) 106'
Manager:
(Croatia) Zoran Mamić

RNK SPLIT:
GK	12	(Croatia) Danijel Zagorac (c)	(yellow card) 120+1'
DF	3	(Croatia) Denis Glavina		(substituted off) 89'
DF	5	(Croatia) Branko Vrgoč
DF	13	(South Korea) Chung Woon	(yellow card) 40'	(substituted off) 90+3'
DF	19	(Croatia) Tomislav Barbarić	(yellow card) 13'
DF	26	(Croatia) Nino Galović	(yellow card) 90+3' (yellow-red card) 94'
MF	10	(Croatia) Ante Erceg
MF	17	(Croatia) Marko Rog	(yellow card) 81'
MF	24	(Serbia) Miloš Vidović	(yellow card) 45+2'
MF	77	(Croatia) Slavko Blagojević	(yellow card) 7'
FW	99	(Albania) Sokol Cikalleshi		(substituted off) 97'
Substitutes:
DF	25	(Croatia) Dario Rugašević	(yellow card) 117'	(substituted on) 89'
MF	8	(Croatia) Antonio Mršić		(substituted on) 90+3'
DF	4	(Croatia) Ante Majstorović	(yellow card) 110'	(substituted on) 97'
Manager:
(Croatia) Zoran Vulić

Assistant referees:
Tomislav Petrović (Valpovo)
Miro Grgić (Osijek)
Fourth official:
Dalibor Conjar (Osijek)
Additional assistant referees:
Domagoj Vučkov (Rijeka)
Mario Zebec (Cestica)

Match rules

- 90 minutes.
- 30 minutes of extra-time if necessary.
- Penalty shoot-out if scores still level.
- Seven named substitutes.
- Maximum of three substitutions.
