= Sandro Kulenović =

Croatian footballer (born 1999)

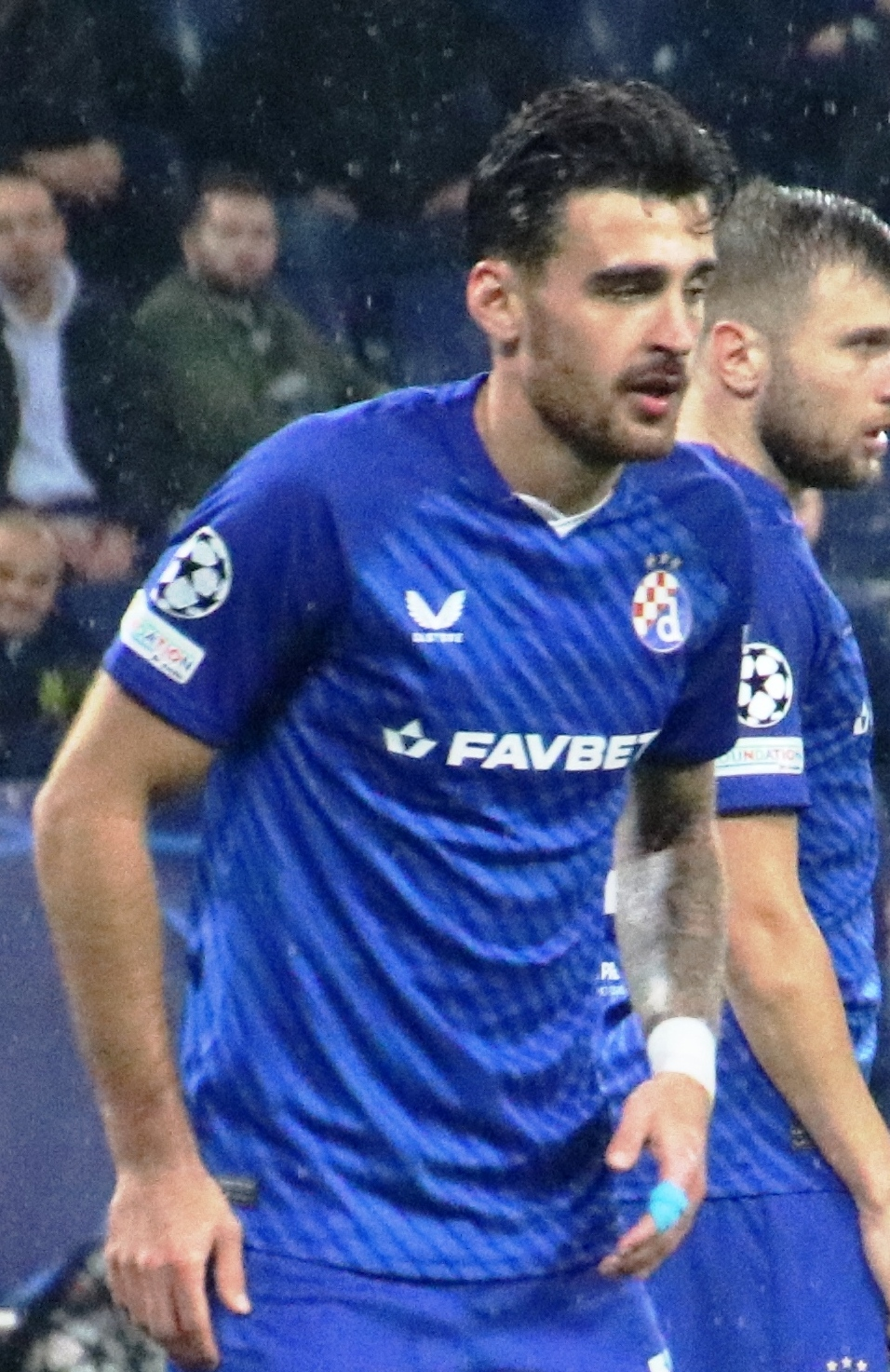
- Kulenović in 2024 with Dinamo Zagreb

Personal information
- Date of birth: 4 December 1999 (age 26)
- Place of birth: Zagreb, Croatia
- Height: 1.91 m (6 ft 3 in)
- Position: Striker

Team information
- Current team: Torino
- Number: 17

Youth career
- 2008–2016: Dinamo Zagreb
- 2017–2018: → Juventus (loan)

Senior career*
Years	Team	Apps	(Gls)
2016–2017	Legia Warsaw II	26	(8)
2018–2019	Legia Warsaw	24	(5)
2019–2026	Dinamo Zagreb	90	(28)
2020–2021	→ Rijeka (loan)	29	(7)
2021–2023	→ Lokomotiva (loan)	69	(20)
2026	→ Torino (loan)	13	(0)
2026–	Torino	9	(2)

International career
2013	Croatia U14	3	(0)
2015	Croatia U15	4	(0)
2014–2015	Croatia U16	10	(2)
2015–2016	Croatia U17	16	(6)
2016–2017	Croatia U19	9	(3)
2018–2019	Croatia U20	3	(3)
2019–2021	Croatia U21	16	(6)
2022–2023	Croatia U23	2	(1)
- * Club domestic league appearances and goals as of 01:04, 12 November 2026 (UTC)

Sandro Kulenović (Croatian pronunciation: [sâːndro kulěːnoʋitɕ]; born 4 December 1999) is a Croatian professional footballer who plays as a striker for Serie A club Torino.

== Club career ==
Kulenović was born in Zagreb in 1999. His father Almin Kulenović, who hails from Bihać, is a former Bosnian international who has seven caps for Bosnia and Herzegovina. His mother Tajana (née Prša) is the daughter of Croatian musician Franjo "Nano" Prša.

Kulenović joined the academy of Dinamo Zagreb in 2008. During the 2015–16 season, he played 27 times for the reserves, scoring 22 goals and adding 11 assists. On 7 June 2016, he moved abroad and joined the academy of Polish club Legia Warsaw on a three-year contract. On 22 July 2017, he was loaned out to the youth team of Italian club Juventus, but returned to his parent club in the following June.

On 10 July 2018, Kulenović made his first team debut, playing the last nine minutes of a 1–0 victory over Irish club Cork City in the UEFA Champions League. On 22 August, he signed a three-year contract extension with the club. On 27 October, he scored his first goal for the club in a 1–1 league draw against Jagiellonia Białystok.

On 2 September 2019, Kulenović returned to Dinamo Zagreb, signing a long-term deal. He debuted on 21 September against Varaždin. However, after an unsuccessful season where he failed to scored a single goal, he was loaned out to Rijeka on 21 September 2020. On 24 September, in a Europa League third qualifying round against Kolos Kovalivka, he made his debut for Rijeka. The match went into extra time and, while the score was 1–0, Kulenović notably had an opportunity to set the score to 2–0; however, the ball stopped in a puddle of mud on the goal line as the pitch was soaking wet due to heavy rain. It was then netted in by teammate Franko Andrijašević. He scored his first goal for Rijeka on 4 October, a penalty kick in a 2–0 victory over Slaven Belupo. In the second half of the season, Kulenović fell out of favour with coach Simon Rožman, who left him out of the squad during the training ahead of the derby with Hajduk Split on 27 February 2021.

On 31 January 2026, Kulenović joined Serie A outfit Torino on a five-month loan, with an option to buy and a condititonal obligation to make the move permanent.. Since Torino stayed up in Serie A, the clause was automatically activated, making him a Torino player as of 1 July.

== International career ==
Kulenović has been capped at youth international level and also captained the Croatia under-16 team. He was part of Croatia's 23-man squads for UEFA Under-21 Euros 2019 and 2021.

During August 2024, various Bosnian and Croatian media reported about the possibility of Kulenović choosing to represent Bosnia and Herzegovina internationally. Kulenović allegedly refused to represent any national team other than Croatia, as well as stated that he had not been contacted by the Football Association of Bosnia and Herzegovina at all.

== Style of play ==
Kulenović plays as a typical number 9. Croatian journalists have often hailed him as "the new Mandžukić", whom he named his idol alongside Fernando Torres.

== Career statistics ==
As of match played 12 October 2026

Appearances and goals by club, season and competition
Club	Season	League			National cup (Note: Includes Polish Cup, Croatian Cup, Coppa Italia)		Europe		Total	
Club	Season	Division	Apps	Goals	Apps	Goals	Apps	Goals	Apps	Goals
Legia Warsaw	2018–19	Ekstraklasa	21	4	3	0	1 (Note: Appearance(s) in UEFA Champions League)	0	25	4
Legia Warsaw	2019–20	Ekstraklasa	3	1	0	0	8 (Note: Appearances in UEFA Europa League)	1	11	2
Legia Warsaw	Total		24	5	3	0	9	1	36	6
Dinamo Zagreb	2019–20	Prva HNL	16	0	0	0	0	0	16	0
Dinamo Zagreb	2020–21	Prva HNL	2	0	0	0	0	0	2	0
Dinamo Zagreb	2021–22	Prva HNL	0	0	0	0	1	0	1	0
Dinamo Zagreb	2023–24	Prva HNL	21	7	6	4	8 (Note: Appearances in UEFA Europa Conference League)	0	35	11
Dinamo Zagreb	2024–25	Prva HNL	35	15	3	2	9	3	47	20
Dinamo Zagreb	2025–26	Prva HNL	16	6	2	3	8	1	26	10
Dinamo Zagreb	Total		90	28	11	9	26	4	127	41
Rijeka (loan)	2020–21	Prva HNL	29	7	2	0	6	1	37	8
Lokomotiva (loan)	2021–22	Prva HNL	29	10	3	1	—		32	11
Lokomotiva (loan)	2022–23	Prva HNL	34	9	3	3	—		37	12
Lokomotiva (loan)	2023–24	Prva HNL	6	1	—		—		6	1
Lokomotiva (loan)	Total		69	20	6	4	—		75	24
Torino (loan)	2025–26	Serie A	13	0	1	1	—		14	1
Torino	2026–27	Serie A	4	2	2	0	—		6	2
Torino	Total		17	2	3	1	—		20	3
Career total			229	62	25	14	41	6	295	82

== Honours ==
Dinamo Zagreb

- Croatian Football League: 2019–20, 2023–24
- Croatian Cup: 2023–24
