= Momčilo Raspopović =

Montenegrin footballer

Personal information
- Date of birth: 18 March 1994 (age 32)
- Place of birth: Podgorica, Montenegro, FR Yugoslavia
- Height: 1.83 m (6 ft 0 in)
- Position: Right back

Team information
- Current team: Budućnost Podgorica
- Number: 20

Youth career
- 2006–2012: Budućnost Podgorica

Senior career*
Years	Team	Apps	(Gls)
2012–2018	Budućnost Podgorica	143	(7)
2018	→ Rijeka (loan)	8	(0)
2018–2021	Rijeka	36	(2)
2021	Astra Giurgiu	13	(1)
2021–2022	Budućnost Podgorica	28	(3)
2022–2024	Gorica	35	(1)
2024–2025	Karviná	17	(0)
2025–	Budućnost Podgorica	24	(2)

International career^{‡}
2010	Montenegro U17	3	(0)
2012	Montenegro U19	2	(0)
2013–2016	Montenegro U21	9	(1)
2019–	Montenegro	4	(0)
- * Club domestic league appearances and goals as of 17 June 2026 ‡ National team caps and goals as of 9 October 2020

Momčilo Raspopović (Montenegrin Cyrillic: Момчило Распоповић; born 18 March 1994) is a Montenegrin professional footballer who plays as a right back for Budućnost Podgorica and the Montenegro national football team.

== Club career ==
=== Budućnost ===
Born in Podgorica, he raised through the ranks of Budućnost where he made his senior debut playing in the Montenegrin First League in the 2012–13 season. At the age of 22, he played both legs in the Europa League second qualifying round matches for Budućnost against Genk. In the first leg played on 14 July 2016, Raspopović was a starter, although Budućnost lost by a score of 2–0 at Genk's Luminus Arena. He also started in the second leg against Genk a week later, which Budućnost won 2–0, although Raspopović missed a crucial penalty in the penalty shootout after overtime. It was arguably Raspopović's first encounter with a team from a significantly stronger league, as Genk at the time fielded the likes of Wilfred Ndidi. Following more than five years with the club, in January 2018, he was loaned to HNK Rijeka in Croatia until the end of the season with a buying option.

=== Rijeka ===
Raspopović was loaned to Rijeka in January 2018, after which he made his league debut in a 4–0 victory against NK Istra 1961 on 10 February 2018. After playing a total of eight league games for the rest of the 2017–18 season, Rijeka opted to buy Raspopović's contract from Budućnost, after which he was no a loaned player. On 2 September 2018, Raspopović scored a goal from distance in a 1–1 tie against Dinamo Zagreb.

=== Karviná ===
On 23 February 2024, Raspopović signed a contract with Czech club Karviná.

== International career ==
After having been part of the Montenegrin U17 and Montenegrin U19 team, Raspopović has been a regular presence in the Montenegrin U21 team between 2013 and 2016. On 14 November 2019, he made his senior debut under coach Faruk Hadžibegić in Montenegro's Euro 2020 qualifier against England, which Montenegro lost 7–0.

== Honours ==
Budućnost

- Montenegrin First League: 2016–17
- Montenegrin Cup: 2012–13

Rijeka

- Croatian Cup: 2019, 2020
