= Ivan Nevistić =

Croatian footballer (born 1998)

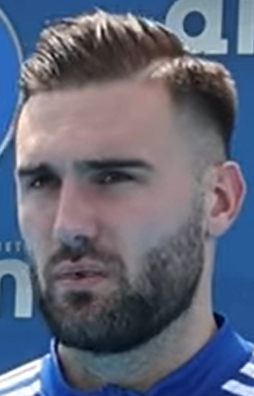
- Nevistić in 2024 Dinamo Zagreb

Personal information
- Full name: Ivan Nevistić
- Date of birth: 31 July 1998 (age 28)
- Place of birth: Đakovo, Croatia
- Height: 1.93 m (6 ft 4 in)
- Position: Goalkeeper

Team information
- Current team: Dinamo Zagreb
- Number: 33

Youth career
- 2009–2013: Đakovo
- 2013–2015: Osijek
- 2015–2017: Rijeka

Senior career*
Years	Team	Apps	(Gls)
2016–2021	Rijeka	33	(0)
2017–2018	→ Varaždin (loan)	32	(0)
2018	→ Mura (loan)	0	(0)
2019–2020	→ Varaždin (loan)	48	(0)
2021–	Dinamo Zagreb	62	(0)
2021–2022	→ Lokomotiva (loan)	26	(0)

International career
2012	Croatia U14	2	(0)
2013	Croatia U15	4	(0)
2013–2014	Croatia U16	3	(0)
2014–2015	Croatia U17	4	(0)
2015	Croatia U18	4	(0)
2016–2017	Croatia U19	11	(0)
2018	Croatia U20	2	(0)
2019	Croatia U21	1	(0)
- * Club domestic league appearances and goals as of 29 August 2026

Ivan Nevistić (born 31 July 1998) is a Croatian professional footballer who plays as a goalkeeper for Croatian Football League club Dinamo Zagreb.

== Club career ==
Nevistić started his football career at the club Đakovo from his hometown with the same name. He joined Rijeka's youth team in June 2015. He signed his first professional contract with the club in June 2016. He spent most of his early professional years on loan at Varaždin. In July 2018, Nevistić signed a new four-year contract with Rijeka. In the 2020–21 UEFA Europa League, Nevistić accumulated more saves than any other goalkeeper in the group stage (19), as Rijeka finished last in their group.

== International career ==
He has been capped for various Croatian youth national teams.

== Career statistics ==
As of match played 29 August 2026

Appearances and goals by club, season and competition
Club	Season	League			National cup (Note: Includes Croatian Cup, Slovenian Cup)		Europe		Other		Total	
Club	Season	Division	Apps	Goals	Apps	Goals	Apps	Goals	Apps	Goals	Apps	Goals
Rijeka	2016–17	Croatian Football League	0	0	0	0	0	0	—		0	0
Rijeka	2020–21	Croatian Football League	33	0	2	0	8 (Note: Appearances in UEFA Europa League)	0	—		43	0
Rijeka	Total		33	0	2	0	8	0	—		43	0
Varaždin (loan)	2017–18	Croatian Second Football League	32	0	1	0	—		2 (Note: Appearances in relegation play-offs)	0	35	0
Mura (loan)	2018–19	Slovenian PrvaLiga	0	0	1	0	—		—		1	0
Varaždin (loan)	2018–19	First Football League	12	0	—		—		—		12	0
Varaždin (loan)	2019–20	First Football League	36	0	2	0	—		—		38	0
Varaždin (loan)	Total		48	0	2	0	—		—		50	0
Dinamo Zagreb	2021–22	Croatian Football League	0	0	0	0	0	0	0	0	0	0
Dinamo Zagreb	2022–23	Croatian Football League	1	0	1	0	0	0	—		2	0
Dinamo Zagreb	2023–24	Croatian Football League	21	0	4	0	9 (Note: Two appearances in UEFA Europa League, seven appearances in UEFA Conference League)	0	—		34	0
Dinamo Zagreb	2024–25	Croatian Football League	24	0	5	0	7 (Note: Appearances in UEFA Champions League)	0	—		36	0
Dinamo Zagreb	2025–26	Croatian Football League	13	0	0	0	5	0	—		18	0
Dinamo Zagreb	2026–27	Croatian Football League	3	0	0	0	3 (Note: Three appearances in UEFA Champions League)	0	—		6	0
Dinamo Zagreb	Total		62	0	10	0	24	0	0	0	96	0
Lokomotiva (loan)	2021–22	First Football League	26	0	3	0	—		—		29	0
Career total			189	0	19	0	32	0	2	0	242	0
