= Filip Braut =

Croatian footballer

Personal information
- Date of birth: 5 June 2002 (age 24)
- Place of birth: Rijeka, Croatia
- Height: 1.68 m (5 ft 6 in)
- Position: Right-back

Team information
- Current team: Orijent
- Number: 2

Youth career
- 2013–2020: Rijeka

Senior career*
Years	Team	Apps	(Gls)
2019–2022	Rijeka	19	(0)
2022	Hrvatski Dragovoljac	13	(0)
2022–2023	Rijeka	0	(0)
2022–2023	→ Orijent (loan)	32	(1)
2023	Rogaška	9	(0)
2024–	Orijent	79	(1)

International career^{‡}
2016	Croatia U14	3	(0)
2018–2019	Croatia U17	13	(0)
2019	Croatia U18	1	(0)
2019–	Croatia U19	8	(0)
- * Club domestic league appearances and goals as of 17 June 2026 ‡ National team caps and goals as of 23:18, 6 October 2020 (UTC)

Filip Braut (born 5 June 2002) is a Croatian professional footballer who plays as a right-back for Orijent.

== Club career ==
Born in Rijeka, Braut progressed through the youth academy of hometown club HNK Rijeka. He made his professional debut on 25 May 2019 against Slaven Belupo, on the last matchday of the 2018–19 season. He was utilised as a centre-back in the 1–1 draw. With this appearance, he became the youngest player to debut for the club at 16 years, 11 months and 20 days.

Braut signed his first professional contract on 26 February 2020. On 1 August 2020, Braut started in the Croatian Cup final against Lokomotiva Zagreb, where he won his first trophy after a 1–0 win.

== International career ==
From 2018 to 2019, Braut represented the Croatia U17, where he won eight caps.

== Career statistics ==
=== Club ===
As of 30 January 2022

Club	Season	League			Cup		Continental		Other		Total	
Club	Season	Division	Apps	Goals	Apps	Goals	Apps	Goals	Apps	Goals	Apps	Goals
Rijeka	2018–19	1. HNL	1	0	0	0	0	0	0	0	1	0
Rijeka	2019–20	1. HNL	9	0	1	0	0	0	0	0	10	0
Rijeka	2020–21	1. HNL	7	0	2	0	2	0	0	0	11	0
Rijeka	2021–22	1. HNL	2	0	1	0	1	0	0	0	4	0
Career total			19	0	4	0	3	0	0	0	26	0

== Honours ==
Rijeka

- Croatian Cup: 2018–19, 2019–20
