= Luka Menalo =

Footballer (born 1996)

Personal information
- Date of birth: 22 July 1996 (age 30)
- Place of birth: Opuzen, Croatia
- Height: 1.81 m (5 ft 11 in)
- Position: Winger

Team information
- Current team: Persib Bandung
- Number: 9

Youth career
- –2013: Čapljina
- 2013–2014: Višići
- 2014–2015: Široki Brijeg

Senior career*
| Years | Team | Apps | (Gls) |
| 2014 | Čapljina | 12 | (2) |
| 2014–2018 | Široki Brijeg | 71 | (28) |
| 2018–2025 | Dinamo Zagreb | 59 | (5) |
| 2019 | → Slaven Belupo (loan) | 12 | (0) |
| 2019–2020 | → Olimpija Ljubljana (loan) | 33 | (10) |
| 2020 | Dinamo Zagreb II | 2 | (0) |
| 2020–2021 | → Rijeka (loan) | 28 | (6) |
| 2024 | → Celje (loan) | 18 | (2) |
| 2025–2026 | Rijeka | 32 | (4) |
| 2026 | Sarajevo | 17 | (3) |
| 2026– | Persib Bandung | 9 | (2) |

International career^{‡}
| 2014–2015 | Bosnia and Herzegovina U19 | | |
| 2017–2018 | Bosnia and Herzegovina U21 (Note: Official competitive UEFA matches only.) | 7 | (2) |
| 2018– | Bosnia and Herzegovina | 16 | (3) |
- * Club domestic league appearances and goals as of 20 November 2026 ‡ National team caps and goals as of 12 October 2025

Luka Menalo (Croatian pronunciation: [lûːka měnalo]; born 22 July 1996) is a professional footballer who plays as a winger for Indonesian Super League club Persib Bandung. Born in Croatia, he plays for the Bosnia and Herzegovina national team.

Menalo started his senior career at Čapljina, before joining Široki Brijeg in 2014. A former youth international for Bosnia and Herzegovina, he made his senior international debut in 2018.

== Club career ==
=== Early career ===
Growing up in Čapljina, Menalo made his senior debut for HNK Čapljina against Mladost on 2 March 2014 at the age of 17. On 14 May, he scored his first senior goal against Igman Konjic.

In the summer of 2014, Menalo switched to Široki Brijeg. In January 2015, he signed a professional contract with the team until 2020. Menalo scored his first career hat-trick on 21 September 2016, in a game against his former club Čapljina. Menalo was voted the best young player of the league in his last two seasons with Široki Brijeg.

=== Dinamo Zagreb ===
In February 2018, Croatian side Dinamo Zagreb announced that Menalo would join them the following season on a five-year contract. He made his competitive debut for the club against Rudeš on 27 July 2018.

In January 2019, Menalo was loaned to Slaven Belupo until the end of the 2018–19 season.

In July 2019, he was sent on a season-long loan to Slovenian PrvaLiga side Olimpija Ljubljana.

Menalo scored a hat-trick in the 2020–21 Croatian Cup win over Ferdinandovac on 26 September 2020, which were his first goals for Dinamo Zagreb.

In October 2020, he was sent on a season-long loan to Rijeka. He scored 10 goals in 36 appearances for the club in all competitions.

After returning from loan, Menalo scored a brace for Dinamo in a triumph over Hrvatski Dragovoljac in October 2021, his first league goals with the club.

=== Persib Bandung ===
On 2 July 2026, Menalo officially completed a transfer to Indonesian Super League club Persib Bandung, marking his first venture into Asian football following his extensive career in Croatia, Slovenia, and Bosnia and Herzegovina.

== International career ==
Menalo, an ethnic Croat, represented Bosnia and Herzegovina at under-19 and under-21 level. As he was born in Croatia and is of Croatian descent, he could have represented Croatia, but declined the offers.

In January 2018, he received his first senior call-up, for friendly games against the United States and Mexico. Menalo debuted in a goalless draw against the former on 28 January. On 7 September 2021, Menalo scored his first goal for the national team in the 2022 FIFA World Cup qualification match against Kazakhstan, putting Bosnia and Herzegovina 2–1 ahead in an eventual 2–2 draw.

== Career statistics ==
=== Club ===
As of match played 19 November 2026

Appearances and goals by club, season and competition
| Club | Season | League | | | National cup (Note: Includes Bosnian Cup, Croatian Cup, Slovenian Cup) | | Continental | | Other | | Total | |
| Club | Season | Division | Apps | Goals | Apps | Goals | Apps | Goals | Apps | Goals | Apps | Goals |
|---|---|---|---|---|---|---|---|---|---|---|---|---|
| Čapljina | 2013–14 | First League of FBiH | 12 | 2 | — | | — | | — | | 12 | 2 |
| Široki Brijeg | 2014–15 | Bosnian Premier League | 4 | 2 | 2 | 0 | — | | — | | 6 | 2 |
| Široki Brijeg | 2015–16 | Bosnian Premier League | 16 | 4 | 4 | 4 | — | | — | | 20 | 8 |
| Široki Brijeg | 2016–17 | Bosnian Premier League | 28 | 10 | 7 | 4 | 2 (Note: Appearances in UEFA Europa League) | 0 | — | | 37 | 14 |
| Široki Brijeg | 2017–18 | Bosnian Premier League | 23 | 12 | 1 | 0 | 4 | 0 | — | | 28 | 12 |
| Široki Brijeg | Total | | 71 | 28 | 14 | 8 | 6 | 0 | — | | 91 | 36 |
| Dinamo Zagreb | 2018–19 | Croatian First League | 10 | 0 | 2 | 0 | 0 | 0 | — | | 12 | 0 |
| Dinamo Zagreb | 2020–21 | Croatian First League | 1 | 0 | 1 | 3 | — | | — | | 2 | 3 |
| Dinamo Zagreb | 2021–22 | Croatian First League | 22 | 3 | 2 | 1 | 13 (Note: Seven appearances and one goal in UEFA Champions League, six appearances and one goal in UEFA Europa League) | 2 | — | | 37 | 6 |
| Dinamo Zagreb | 2022–23 | Croatian League | 22 | 2 | 3 | 0 | 4 (Note: Appearances in UEFA Champions League) | 0 | 1 (Note: Appearances in Croatian Super Cup) | 0 | 30 | 2 |
| Dinamo Zagreb | 2023–24 | Croatian League | 4 | 0 | 2 | 0 | 3 (Note: One appearance in UEFA Champions League, two appearances in UEFA Conference League) | 0 | 1 | 0 | 10 | 0 |
| Dinamo Zagreb | Total | | 59 | 5 | 10 | 4 | 20 | 2 | 2 | 0 | 91 | 11 |
| Slaven Belupo (loan) | 2018–19 | Croatian First League | 12 | 0 | — | | — | | — | | 12 | 0 |
| Olimpija Ljubljana (loan) | 2019–20 | Slovenian PrvaLiga | 33 | 10 | 1 | 0 | 4 | 2 | — | | 38 | 12 |
| Dinamo Zagreb II | 2020–21 | Croatian Second League | 2 | 0 | — | | — | | — | | 2 | 0 |
| Rijeka (loan) | 2020–21 | Croatian First League | 28 | 6 | 4 | 3 | 4 | 1 | — | | 36 | 10 |
| Celje (loan) | 2023–24 | Slovenian PrvaLiga | 13 | 1 | — | | — | | — | | 13 | 1 |
| Celje (loan) | 2024–25 | Slovenian PrvaLiga | 5 | 1 | — | | 5 (Note: Two appearances in UEFA Champions League, two appearances and one goal in UEFA Europa League, one appearance in UEFA Conference League) | 1 | — | | 10 | 2 |
| Celje (loan) | Total | | 18 | 2 | — | | 5 | 1 | — | | 23 | 3 |
| Rijeka | 2024–25 | Croatian League | 17 | 1 | 4 | 0 | — | | — | | 21 | 1 |
| Rijeka | 2025–26 | Croatian League | 15 | 3 | 1 | 0 | 11 (Note: Two appearances in UEFA Champions League, four appearances and one goal in UEFA Europa League, five appearances in UEFA Conference League) | 1 | — | | 27 | 4 |
| Rijeka | Total | | 32 | 4 | 5 | 0 | 11 | 1 | — | | 48 | 5 |
| Sarajevo | 2025–26 | Bosnian Premier League | 17 | 3 | 3 | 0 | — | | 1 (Note: Appearance in Bosnian Supercup) | 0 | 21 | 3 |
| Persib Bandung | 2026–27 | Super League | 9 | 2 | — | | 4 (Note: Appearances in AFC Champions League Two) | 1 | 2 (Note: Appearances in ASEAN Club Championship) | 2 | 15 | 5 |
| Career total | | | 293 | 62 | 37 | 15 | 54 | 8 | 5 | 2 | 389 | 87 |

=== International ===
As of match played 12 October 2025

Appearances and goals by national team and year
| National team | Year | Apps | Goals |
|---|---|---|---|
Bosnia and Herzegovina
| Bosnia and Herzegovina | 2018 | 2 | 0 |
| Bosnia and Herzegovina | 2019 | 0 | 0 |
| Bosnia and Herzegovina | 2020 | 0 | 0 |
| Bosnia and Herzegovina | 2021 | 6 | 2 |
| Bosnia and Herzegovina | 2022 | 5 | 1 |
| Bosnia and Herzegovina | 2023 | 2 | 0 |
| Bosnia and Herzegovina | 2024 | 0 | 0 |
| Bosnia and Herzegovina | 2025 | 1 | 0 |
| Total | | 16 | 3 |

Scores and results list Bosnia and Herzegovina's goal tally first, score column indicates score after each Menalo goal.

List of international goals scored by Luka Menalo
| No. | Date | Venue | Opponent | Score | Result | Competition | Ref. |
|---|---|---|---|---|---|---|---|
| 1 | 7 September 2021 | Bilino Polje Stadium, Zenica, Bosnia and Herzegovina | Kazakhstan | 2–1 | 2–2 | 2022 FIFA World Cup qualification | |
| 2 | 13 November 2021 | Bilino Polje Stadium, Zenica, Bosnia and Herzegovina | Finland | 1–2 | 1–3 | 2022 FIFA World Cup qualification | |
| 3 | 11 June 2022 | Podgorica City Stadium, Podgorica, Montenegro | Montenegro | 1–0 | 1–1 | 2022–23 UEFA Nations League B | |

== Honours ==
Široki Brijeg

- Bosnian Cup: 2016–17

Dinamo Zagreb

- Croatian Football League: 2021–22, 2022–23
- Croatian Super Cup: 2022, 2023

Celje

- Slovenian PrvaLiga: 2023–24

Rijeka

- Croatian Football League: 2024–25
- Croatian Cup: 2024–25

Persib Bandung

- Piala Presiden runner-up: 2026

Individual

- Bosnian Premier League Young Player of the Season: 2016–17, 2017–18
