= Domagoj Pavičić =

Croatian footballer

Personal information
- Date of birth: 9 March 1994 (age 32)
- Place of birth: Zagreb, Croatia
- Height: 1.79 m (5 ft 10 in)
- Position: Central midfielder

Team information
- Current team: Gorica
- Number: 24

Youth career
- –2004: Jarun Zagreb
- 2005–2007: NK Zagreb
- 2007–2012: Dinamo Zagreb

Senior career*
Years	Team	Apps	(Gls)
2012–2018	Dinamo Zagreb	56	(5)
2012–2013	→ Lokomotiva (loan)	18	(1)
2014–2015	→ Lokomotiva (loan)	21	(8)
2018–2022	Rijeka	141	(15)
2022–2023	Konyaspor	7	(0)
2023–	Aris	2	(0)
2024	→ Dinamo București (loan)	18	(1)
2024–2025	→ Sarajevo (loan)	25	(2)
2025–	Gorica	32	(3)

International career
2008	Croatia U14	2	(2)
2009	Croatia U15	2	(0)
2009–2010	Croatia U16	15	(1)
2009–2011	Croatia U17	20	(0)
2012	Croatia U18	2	(0)
2012–2013	Croatia U19	10	(2)
2014–2016	Croatia U21	8	(1)
- * Club domestic league appearances and goals as of 15 June 2026

Domagoj Pavičić (born 9 March 1994) is a Croatian professional footballer who plays as a midfielder for Gorica.

== Career ==
Pavičić joined Lokomotiva on two loans from Dinamo Zagreb in order to get first team chances. He scored his first goal for the club against Zadar in a 2–0 away win. After returning from loan, it was announced that he would debut against his old club Lokomotiva. He came in the match as a 74th-minute substitute for Junior Fernandes as Dinamo won the match 2–0. Zoran Mamić, the coach of Dinamo Zagreb said: "Pavičić represents the future of Dinamo and maybe soon he will be in a very narrow choice for the first team." On 1 September 2017, Pavičić was loaned to Rijeka until January 2018. In January 2018, following the end of the loan, Pavičić signed a 4 1/2-year contract with Rijeka. After leaving Rijeka in summer 2022, he joined Konyaspor as a free agent, being followed by his teammate Robert Murić.

On 20 June 2023, he signed a three-year contract with Aris.

On January 16, 2024, the Dinamo Bucharest club announced that it had signed a contract with Domagoj, the period of the contract not being mentioned. He ended his loan in May 2024 and returned to Aris.

== Career statistics ==
As of match played 31 May 2025

Appearances and goals by club, season and competition
Club	Season	League			National cup (Note: Includes Croatian Cup, Turkish Cup, Bosnia and Herzegovina Cup)		Continental		Other		Total	
Club	Season	Division	Apps	Goals	Apps	Goals	Apps	Goals	Apps	Goals	Apps	Goals
Lokomotiva (loan)	2012–13	Prva HNL	12	0	2	0	—		—		14	0
Lokomotiva (loan)	2013–14	Prva HNL	6	1	—		—		—		6	1
Lokomotiva (loan)	2014–15	Prva HNL	21	8	3	1	—		—		24	9
Lokomotiva (loan)	Total		39	9	5	1	—		—		44	10
Dinamo Zagreb	2013–14	Prva HNL	10	1	2	0	—		—		12	1
Dinamo Zagreb	2014–15	Prva HNL	9	2	2	0	—		—		11	2
Dinamo Zagreb	2015–16	Prva HNL	11	0	2	0	1 (Note: Appearance(s) in UEFA Champions League)	0	—		14	0
Dinamo Zagreb	2016–17	Prva HNL	24	2	2	0	8	0	—		34	2
Dinamo Zagreb	2017–18	Prva HNL	2	0	—		1 (Note: Appearance(s) in UEFA Europa League)	0	—		3	0
Dinamo Zagreb	Total		56	5	8	0	10	0	—		74	5
Rijeka	2017–18	Prva HNL	26	5	3	1	5	1	—		34	7
Rijeka	2018–19	Prva HNL	32	4	5	1	2	0	—		39	5
Rijeka	2019–20	Prva HNL	24	0	2	1	0	0	1 (Note: Appearance in Croatian Super Cup)	0	27	1
Rijeka	2020–21	Prva HNL	29	1	1	1	6	0	—		36	2
Rijeka	2021–22	Prva HNL	30	5	3	0	6 (Note: Appearance(s) in UEFA Europa Conference League)	1	—		39	6
Rijeka	Total		141	15	14	4	19	2	1	0	175	21
Konyaspor	2022–23	Süper Lig	7	0	2	0	3	0	—		12	0
Aris Thessaloniki	2023–24	Super League	2	0	—		4	0	—		6	0
Dinamo București (loan)	2023–24	Liga I	18	1	—		—		2 (Note: Appearance in Liga I promotion/relegation play-offs)	0	20	1
Sarajevo (loan)	2024–25	Bosnian Premier League	25	2	7	1	—		—		32	3
Career total			288	32	36	6	36	2	3	0	363	40

== Honours ==
Dinamo Zagreb

- Prva HNL: 2013–14, 2014–15, 2015–16
- Croatian Cup: 2014–15, 2015–16

Rijeka

- Croatian Cup: 2018–19, 2019–20
- Croatian Super Cup runner-up: 2019

Sarajevo

- Bosnian Cup: 2024–25

Individual

- Team of the Year Prva HNL: 2018–19, 2021–22
- Most assists in the Prva HNL: 2017–18
