= Robert Murić =

Croatian footballer

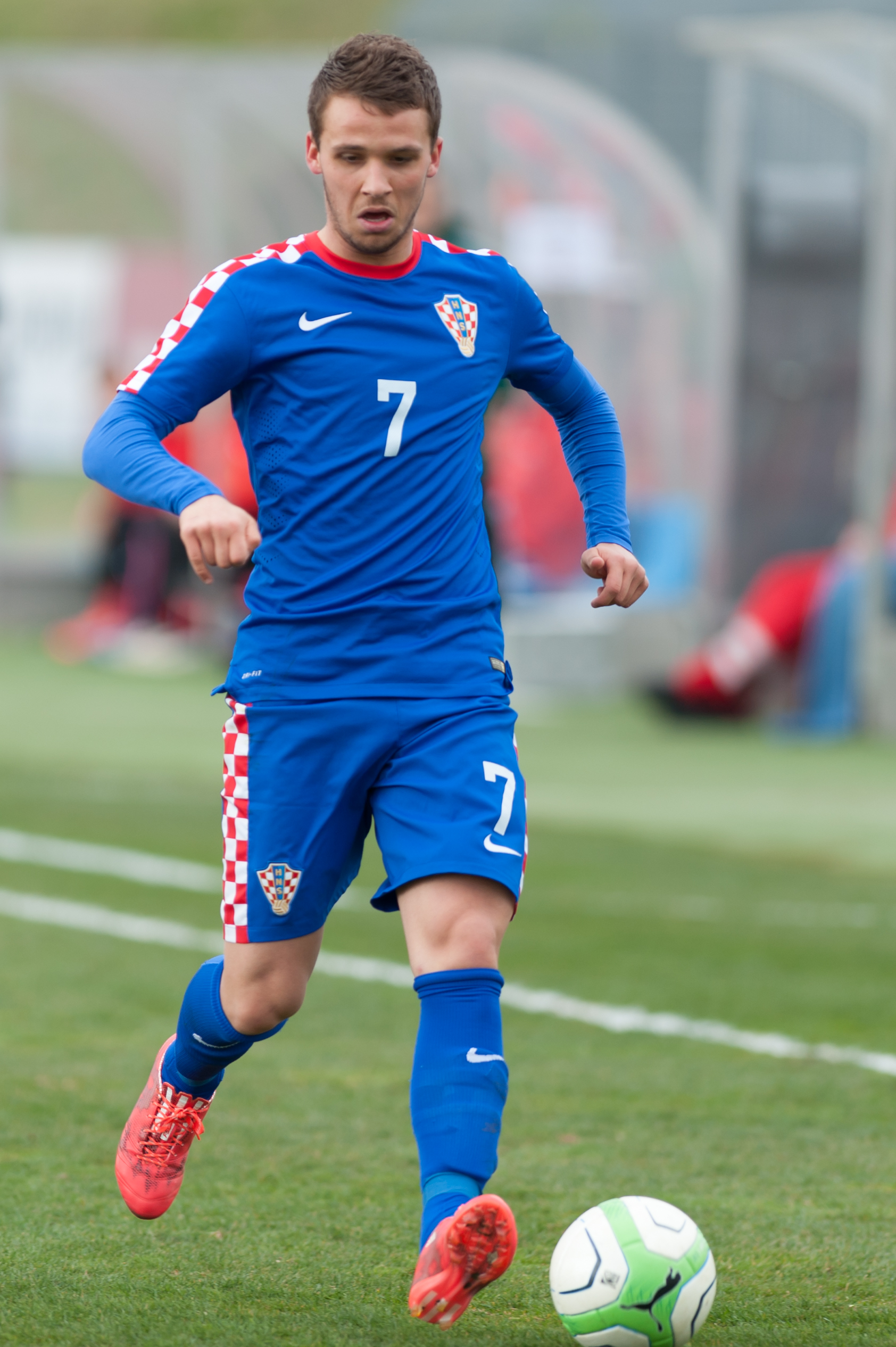
- Murić playing for Croatia U19 in 2015

Personal information
- Date of birth: 12 March 1996 (age 30)
- Place of birth: Varaždin, Croatia
- Height: 1.79 m (5 ft 10 1/2 in)
- Position: Right winger

Team information
- Current team: Bylis Ballsh
- Number: 99

Youth career
- 2002–2005: Lepoglava
- 2006–2007: Schiedel Novi Golubovec
- 2007–2008: Ivančica Ivanec
- 2009–2011: Zagorec Krapina
- 2011–2014: Dinamo Zagreb

Senior career*
Years	Team	Apps	(Gls)
2014–2017	Jong Ajax	48	(15)
2015–2016	Ajax	2	(0)
2016–2017	→ Pescara (loan)	5	(1)
2017–2019	Braga B	18	(2)
2019–2022	Rijeka	100	(28)
2022–2024	Konyaspor	44	(2)
2024–2025	Slaven Belupo	20	(2)
2025–2026	NŠ Mura	27	(0)
2026–	Bylis Ballsh	0	(0)

International career^{‡}
2012–2013	Croatia U17	7	(3)
2015	Croatia U19	3	(0)
2019	Croatia U21	5	(1)
- * Club domestic league appearances and goals as of 25 June 2025 ‡ National team caps and goals as of 21 June 2019

Robert Murić (born 12 March 1996) is a Croatian professional footballer who plays as a right winger for Albanian club Bylis Ballsh.

== Club career ==
Murić played youth football in Croatia for Lepoglava, Schiedel Novi Golubovec, Ivančica Ivanec, Zagorec Krapina and Dinamo Zagreb.

In January 2014 he was linked with a transfer to English club Manchester United.

In June 2014 he signed a four-year contract with Dutch club Ajax, effective from 1 July 2014. Dinamo Zagreb claimed that the contract between Murić and Ajax was not valid, and that he remained their player. In July 2014 Murić was awarded squad number 18 by Ajax for the forthcoming season. He played for Jong Ajax in the Eerste Divisie for the 2014–15 and 2015–16 seasons.

He spent the 2016–17 season on loan at Italian club Pescara.

In August 2017 he signed a five-year contract with Portuguese club Braga.

In February 2019 he returned to Croatia and signed a two-and-a-half-year contract with HNK Rijeka.

In June 2022 he signed for Turkish club Konyaspor. He left the club in February 2024. Later that month he signed for Slaven Belupo.

On 15 February 2025, Murić joined NŠ Mura on a one-year deal with an option for an additional one-year extension.

== International career ==
Murić has played for the Croatia under-17 team, for whom he played at the 2013 FIFA U-17 World Cup, as well as the 2013 UEFA European Under-17 Football Championship. He also played for the under-19 team. On 25 March 2019, Murić made his debut with Croatia U21 in the match against Italy U21. He took part with the U21 team in the 2019 UEFA European Under-21 Championship.

== Career statistics ==
As of 26 May 2022.

Club	Season	League	League		Cup		Europe		Total	
Club	Season	League	Apps	Goals	Apps	Goals	Apps	Goals	Apps	Goals
Jong Ajax	2014–15	Jupiler League	17	4	–		–		23	4
Jong Ajax	2015–16	Jupiler League	28	8	–		–		28	8
Jong Ajax	2016–17	Jupiler League	1	1	–		–		1	1
Jong Ajax	2017–18	Jupiler League	2	2	–		–		2	2
Total			48	15	0	0	0	0	48	15
Ajax	2015–16	Eredivisie	2	0	–		–		2	0
Pescara (loan)	2016–17	Serie A	5	1	1	0	–		6	1
Braga B	2017–18	LigaPro	8	0	–		–		8	0
Braga B	2018–19	LigaPro	10	2	–		–		10	2
Total			18	2	0	0	0	0	18	2
Rijeka	2018–19	1. HNL	16	3	1	1	–		17	4
Rijeka	2019–20	1. HNL	24	6	4 (Note: One appearance in Croatian Super Cup and three in Croatian Football Cup.)	3	3 (Note: Appearances in UEFA Europa League.)	1	31	10
Rijeka	2020–21	1. HNL	30	8	3	3	5	1	38	12
Rijeka	2021–22	1. HNL	30	11	4	1	3	0	37	12
Total			100	28	12	8	11	2	123	38
Career total			173	46	13	8	11	2	197	56

== Honours ==
Dinamo Zagreb

- Croatian First Football League: 2013–14

Rijeka

- Croatian Cup: 2019, 2020

=== Individual ===
- Croatian First Football League top assist provider: 2021–22
