= Tibor Halilović =

Croatian footballer (born 1995)

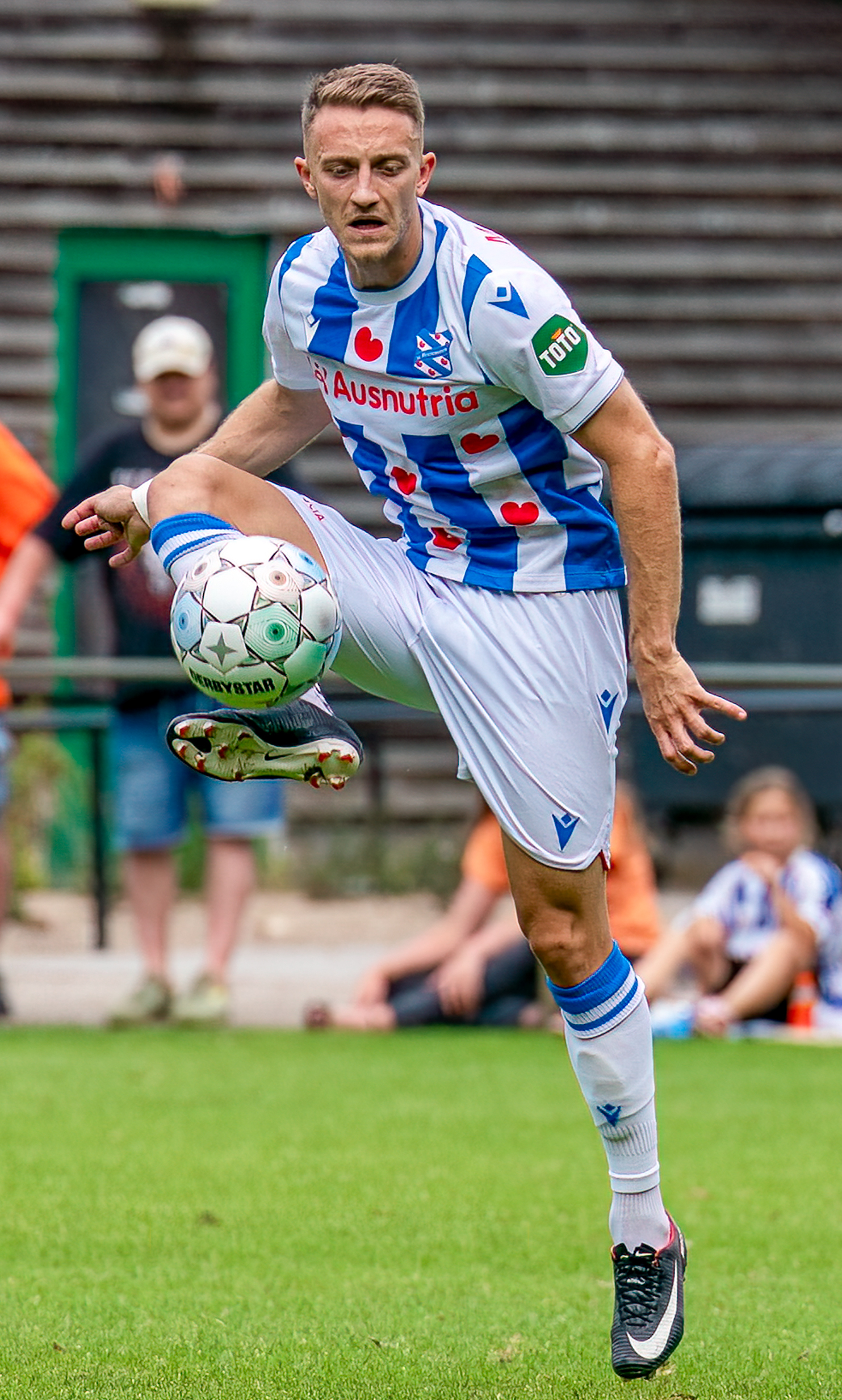
- Tibor Halilović in 2023 with Heerenveen

Personal information
- Date of birth: 18 March 1995 (age 31)
- Place of birth: Zagreb, Croatia
- Height: 1.76 m (5 ft 9 in)
- Position: Midfielder

Team information
- Current team: Tractor
- Number: 7

Youth career
- 2002–2014: Dinamo Zagreb

Senior career*
Years	Team	Apps	(Gls)
2014–2016	Dinamo Zagreb II	46	(5)
2016–2017	Lokomotiva	18	(4)
2017–2019	Wisła Kraków	36	(7)
2019–2021	Rijeka	51	(17)
2021–2023	Heerenveen	69	(16)
2023–2024	Dinamo Zagreb	10	(1)
2024–2025	Gorica	20	(8)
2025–	Tractor	27	(0)
- * Club domestic league appearances and goals as of 1 June 2025

Tibor Halilović (born 18 March 1995) is a Croatian professional footballer who plays as a midfielder for league Persian Gulf Pro League club Tractor.

== Club career ==
On 23 June 2017 Halilović signed a contract with Wisła Kraków in Poland.

=== Rijeka ===
On 22 January 2019, Halilović signed a 2 1/2-year contract with HNK Rijeka in Croatia with a one-year extension option.

Halilović scored the only goal of the Croatian Cup Final against his former club Lokomotiva on 1 August 2020, securing Rijeka their second consecutive Croatian Cup title.

=== Heerenveen ===
On 11 January 2021, Halilović signed with SC Heerenveen until 2024.

=== Dinamo Zagreb ===
On 4 September 2023, Halilović returned to Dinamo Zagreb until 2024.

== Personal life ==
He is cousins with fellow professional footballer Alen Halilović.

== Honours ==
Rijeka

- Croatian Football Cup: 2018–19, 2019–20

Dinamo Zagreb

- Croatian First League: 2023–24
- Croatian Football Cup: 2023–24

Tractor

- Iranian Super Cup: 2025
