= Sterling Yatéké =

Central African Republic footballer

Personal information
- Full name: Sterling Siloe Yatéké
- Date of birth: 15 September 1999 (age 27)
- Place of birth: Bangui, Central African Republic
- Height: 1.85 m (6 ft 1 in)
- Position: Forward

Team information
- Current team: Kolding
- Number: 17

Youth career
- Rèal Comboni

Senior career*
Years	Team	Apps	(Gls)
2016–2017	Rèal Comboni		
2017–2018	Yong Sports Academy		
2018	TPS	11	(7)
2019	Austria Wien	5	(0)
2019–2022	Austria Wien II	32	(8)
2020–2021	→ Rijeka (loan)	29	(2)
2022–2024	Helsingør	36	(8)
2024–	Kolding	37	(13)
- * Club domestic league appearances and goals as of 18:29, 4 October 2026 (UTC)

Sterling Siloe Yatéké (born 15 September 1999) is a Central African professional footballer who plays for Danish 1st Division side Kolding IF.

== Career statistics ==
As of 4 October 2024.

Appearances and goals by club, season and competition
Club	Season	League			Cup (Note: Includes Austrian Cup, Croatian Football Cup and Danish Cup)		Europe		Total	
Club	Season	Division	Apps	Goals	Apps	Goals	Apps	Goals	Apps	Goals
TPS	2018	Veikkausliiga	11	7	–		–		11	7
Austria Wien	2018–19	Austrian Bundesliga	2	0	–		–		2	0
Austria Wien	2019–20	Austrian Bundesliga	3	0	1	1	0	0	4	1
Austria Wien	Total		5	0	1	1	0	0	6	1
Austria Wien II	2018–19	Austrian Second League	12	4	–		–		12	4
Austria Wien II	2019–20	Austrian Second League	9	3	–		–		9	3
Austria Wien II	2021–22	Austrian Second League	11	1	–		–		11	1
Austria Wien II	Total		32	8	0	0	0	0	32	8
Rijeka (loan)	2019–20	1. HNL	10	1	1	1	–		11	2
Rijeka (loan)	2020–21	1. HNL	18	1	1	0	5 (Note: Appearances in UEFA Europa League)	0	24	1
Rijeka (loan)	Total		28	2	2	1	5	0	35	3
Helsingør	2022–23	Danish 1st Division	22	4	2	0	–		24	4
Helsingør	2023–24	Danish 1st Division	14	4	0	0	–		14	4
Helsingør	Total		36	8	2	0	0	0	38	8
Kolding	2024–25	Danish 1st Division	11	1	2	1	–		12	2
Career total			123	26	7	3	5	0	135	29
