= Simon Rožman =

Slovenian football manager (born 1983)

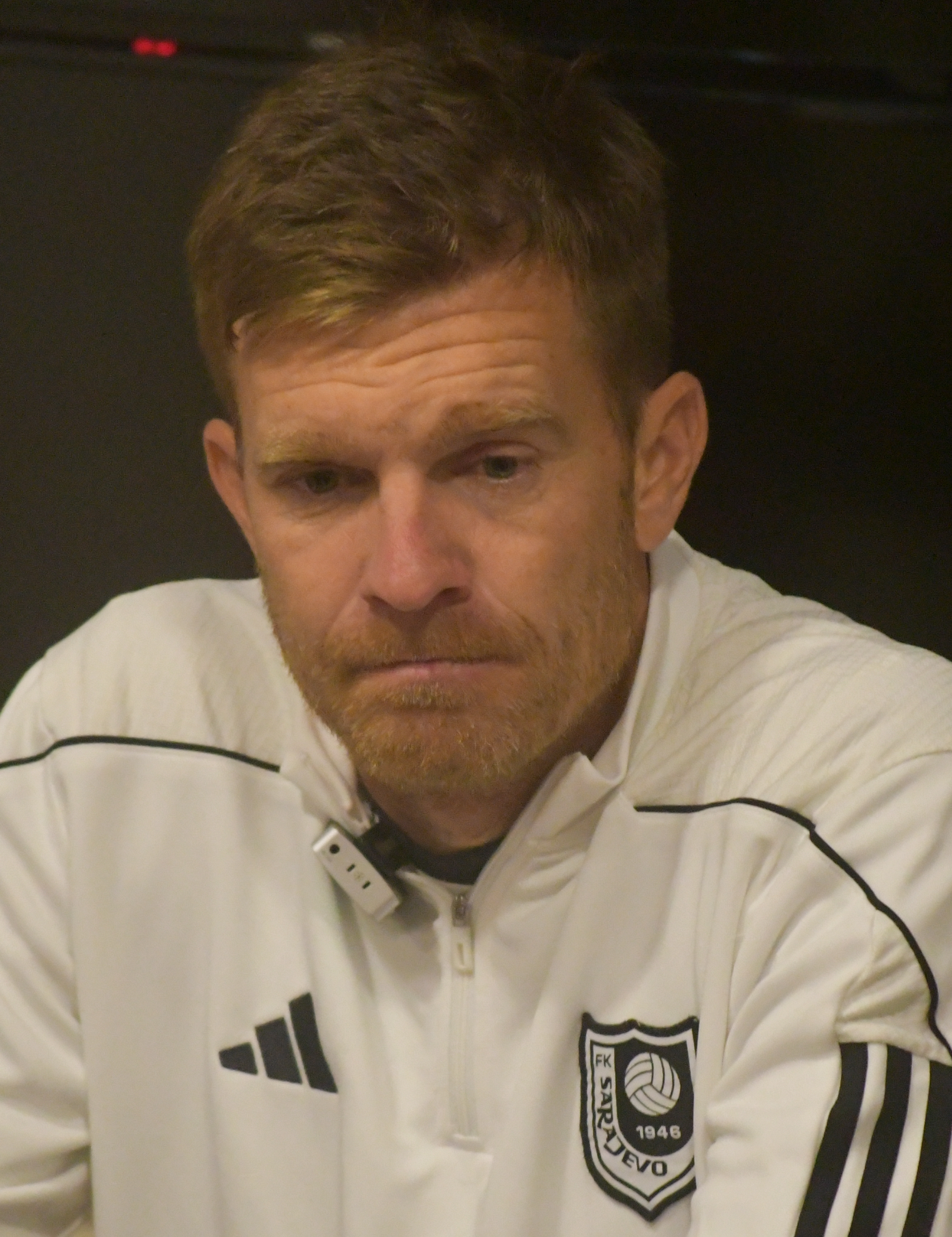
- Rožman with Sarajevo in 2023

Personal information
- Date of birth: 6 April 1983 (age 43)
- Place of birth: Celje, SR Slovenia, Yugoslavia
- Position: Midfielder

Team information
- Current team: Zrinjski Mostar (manager)

Youth career
- –2002: Celje

Senior career*
Years	Team	Apps	(Gls)
2000–2002	Celje	1	(0)
2002	Mons Claudius		
2004–2009	Kovinar Štore		

Managerial career
- 2014–2015: Celje
- 2016–2019: Domžale
- 2019–2021: Rijeka
- 2021: Maribor
- 2022: Celje
- 2022–2023: Domžale
- 2023–2024: Sarajevo
- 2025: Osijek
- 2026–: Zrinjski Mostar
- * Club domestic league appearances and goals

Simon Rožman (born 6 April 1983) is a Slovenian professional football manager and former player who is the manager of Bosnian Premier League club Zrinjski Mostar.

== Managerial career ==
=== Celje ===
Rožman started his managerial career at Celje, where he was at first part of the academy coaching structure, and was in charge of the youth selections. During his time in Celje, he was also the Academy Director. In April 2014, he took over the senior team, becoming the youngest manager in the Slovenian PrvaLiga. He led the club to the second place in the league and was the runner-up of the national cup in 2015.

=== Domžale ===
In 2016 Rožman joined Domžale, first as a sports coordinator, but soon he was promoted to the first team manager. In his first season, he won the national cup and came fourth in the league. In the next season, he led the club to the third place in the league; he also managed to reach the play-off round of the 2017–18 Europa League, eliminating Bundesliga side SC Freiburg on the way. He left Domžale on 3 September 2019, after failing to win a single game during the first eight rounds of the 2019–20 Slovenian PrvaLiga campaign.

=== Rijeka ===
On 23 September 2019, Rožman was appointed as head coach of Prva HNL club Rijeka. With Rijeka, he won the 2019–20 Croatian Cup after beating Lokomotiva 1–0 in the final. During the 2020–21 Europa League qualifying phase, he led Rijeka to respective 2–0 and 1–0 victories over Kolos Kovalivka and Copenhagen, qualifying for the group stage, where the team won four points in a group with Napoli, Real Sociedad and AZ Alkmaar. He resigned on 27 February 2021 after losing 1–0 at home against Hajduk Split.

=== Maribor ===
On 20 March 2021, Rožman signed a three-year contract with Slovenian side Maribor, replacing Mauro Camoranesi. He left the club six months later, on 20 September 2021, after a poor start of the 2021–22 season, as Maribor was sitting in sixth place after nine rounds.

== Managerial statistics ==
As of match played 21 November 2026

Managerial record by team and tenure
Team	From	To	Record				
Team	From	To	G	W	D	L	Win %
Celje	29 April 2014	1 September 2015	59	28	14	17	47.46
Domžale	2 September 2016	3 September 2019	134	67	32	35	50.00
Rijeka	23 September 2019	27 February 2021	65	34	10	21	52.31
Maribor	20 March 2021	20 September 2021	23	10	3	10	43.48
Celje	1 January 2022	1 June 2022	17	6	2	9	35.29
Domžale	2 June 2022	3 August 2023	44	18	14	12	40.91
Sarajevo	3 August 2023	12 June 2024	36	17	10	9	47.22
Osijek	20 March 2025	29 October 2025	23	6	6	11	26.09
Zrinjski Mostar	19 June 2026	Present	17	13	2	2	76.47
Total			418	199	93	126	47.61

== Honours ==
=== Manager ===
Domžale

- Slovenian Cup: 2016–17

Rijeka

- Croatian Cup: 2019–20
