= Antonio Čolak =

Croatian footballer (born 1993)

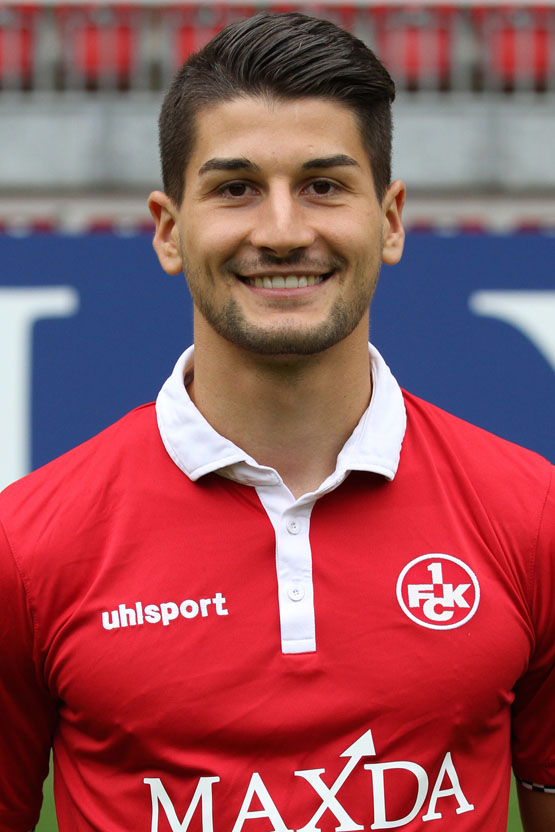
- Čolak with 1. FC Kaiserslautern in 2015

Personal information
- Full name: Antonio-Mirko Čolak
- Date of birth: 17 September 1993 (age 33)
- Place of birth: Ludwigsburg, Germany
- Height: 1.88 m (6 ft 2 in)
- Position: Striker

Team information
- Current team: Legia Warsaw
- Number: 14

Youth career
- 1997–2000: SGV Freiberg Fußball
- 2000–2008: Stuttgarter Kickers
- 2008–2010: SGV Freiberg
- 2010–2011: 1899 Hoffenheim

Senior career*
Years	Team	Apps	(Gls)
2011–2012	Karlsruher SC II	1	(1)
2012–2015	1. FC Nürnberg II	58	(28)
2013–2015	1. FC Nürnberg	7	(0)
2014–2015	→ Lechia Gdańsk (loan)	30	(10)
2015–2019	1899 Hoffenheim	0	(0)
2015	→ 1. FC Kaiserslautern II (loan)	1	(2)
2015–2016	→ 1. FC Kaiserslautern (loan)	22	(5)
2016–2017	→ Darmstadt 98 (loan)	22	(4)
2017	→ FC Ingolstadt II (loan)	1	(1)
2017	→ FC Ingolstadt (loan)	6	(0)
2018–2019	→ Rijeka (loan)	40	(18)
2019–2020	Rijeka	36	(20)
2020–2022	PAOK	25	(3)
2021	→ Malmö FF (loan)	26	(14)
2022–2023	Rangers	25	(14)
2023–2024	Parma	22	(3)
2024–2025	Spezia	24	(1)
2025–	Legia Warsaw	13	(3)
2026–	Legia Warsaw II	1	(1)

International career
2011	Croatia U18	4	(0)
2011–2012	Croatia U19	14	(6)
2011–2012	Croatia U20	3	(1)
2020–2021	Croatia	3	(0)
- * Club domestic league appearances and goals as of 12:40, 19 September 2026 (UTC)

Antonio-Mirko Čolak (Croatian pronunciation: [tʃǒlak, tʃôlaːk]; born 17 September 1993) is a professional footballer who plays as a forward for Ekstraklasa club Legia Warsaw. Born in Germany, he plays for the Croatia national team.

Čolak began his senior career in the lower divisions of German football and has since gone on to play in the top flights of German, Polish, Croatian, Greek, Swedish and Scottish football. He was the top scorer in the 2019–20 Prva HNL season while playing for Croatian club HNK Rijeka. He won the 2021 Allsvenskan title while on loan at Swedish club Malmö from Greek club PAOK.

Čolak played more than 20 times for Croatia's youth national teams, before making his senior international debut for the country in November 2020, in a friendly against Turkey.

== Club career ==
=== Early career ===
The Čolak family immigrated to Germany in 1992 to avoid the war in the former Yugoslavia, where Antonio was born on 17 September 1993. Born in Ludwigsburg, in 2000 he signed for Stuttgarter Kickers, where he remained for eight years before returning to Freiburg in 2008. From there he joined the youth academy at Hoffenheim in 2010 for just one year, and in 2011 moved to Karlsruhe, where he made his professional debut in the lower leagues. In 2012 he was signed by 1. FC Nürnberg, initially for the reserve team. Čolak made his debut on 19 October 2013 in a Bundesliga game against Eintracht Frankfurt. He entered the field after 78 minutes for Tomáš Pekhart. He stayed in Nuremberg until 2015, playing in seven games, while for one season he was loaned out to Lechia Gdańsk, where he scored ten goals in 31 games, also contributing two assists.

=== Hoffenheim and loan spells ===
In the summer of 2015 he signed a contract with TSG 1899 Hoffenheim, but he did not play with the club throughout his contract. Initially he joined 1. FC Kaiserslautern on a season-long loan. On 25 July 2016, Čolak joined Darmstadt 98 on a season-long loan. For the following season he was again sent out on loan, to 2. Bundesliga side FC Ingolstadt.

=== Rijeka ===
Following the mutually agreed termination of the loan at Ingolstadt, in January 2018, Čolak was loaned to HNK Rijeka in Croatia until June 2019. Following the end of the loan, on 22 June 2019 Čolak officially joined HNK Rijeka on a three-year contract. In the 2019–20 season, he was the top scorer in the Croatian championship with 20 goals, while with Rijeka he also won two Croatian Cups. His performances also saw him win a place in the Croatia national football team.

=== PAOK and loan to Malmö ===
On 20 September 2020, PAOK agreed terms with Rijeka for the purchase of Čolak. The Greek club paid a fee over €3,000,000, while Čolak signed a four-year contract worth €450,000 per year.

On 6 March 2021, Čolak moved to Swedish side Malmö FF, on a loan deal until December 2021. At Malmö FF, Čolak quickly established himself as a prolific goalscorer with ten goals in his first 15 appearances and went on to win the title with Malmö. In December 2021, with Malmö FF unwilling to pay the buy out of €3 million that had been set in his loan contract, Croatian newspaper "Sportske Novosti" linked Čolak with a move to Dinamo Zagreb. He returned to PAOK from the beginning of January 2022.

On 20 March 2022, he scored a goal after an Alexandru Mitriță assist, helping PAOK to gain a 1–0 away win against rivals AEK Athens for the Play-off round. It was his first goal for the club after his return from Malmö FF.

=== Rangers ===
On 7 July 2022, Čolak joined his eleventh club Rangers, signing a three-year deal with the Scottish Premiership team. He made his debut for the club against Scottish Premiership side Livingston, starting the match on 30 July. Čolak scored his first goal for Rangers in Scottish Premiership match against Kilmarnock on 6 August then followed this by netting in the next two consecutive matches verse Union Saint-Gilloise and St Johnstone.

On 24 August, Čolak scored the winning goal in the Champions League play-off second leg against PSV Eindhoven to send Rangers to the group stage for the first time since 2010.

=== Parma ===
On 15 July 2023, Čolak left Rangers to join Italian side Parma for an undisclosed fee, reported to be £2.5 million.

=== Spezia ===
On 30 October 2024, Čolak moved to Spezia in Serie B on a two-year contract.

=== Legia Warsaw ===
On 2 September 2025, Čolak signed for Ekstraklasa club Legia Warsaw on a two-year deal. The day prior, Čolak was completing a medical at fellow Polish club Górnik Zabrze and was due to sign his contract, but withdrew last minute after being approached by Legia.

== International career ==
Čolak played youth international football for Croatia at under-18, under-19 and under-20 levels. On 27 August 2020 Croatia national team head coach Zlatko Dalić included Čolak in the list of players for the Nations League fixtures against Portugal on 5 September 2020 and France on 8 September 2020.

On 31 October 2022, Čolak was named in Croatia's preliminary 34-man squad for the 2022 FIFA World Cup, but did not make the final 26.

== Career statistics ==
=== Club ===
As of match played 19 September 2026

Appearances and goals by club, season and competition
Club	Season	League			National cup (Note: Includes Polish Cup, DFB-Pokal, Croatian Football Cup, Greek Football Cup, Svenska Cupen, Scottish Cup)		League cup (Note: Includes Scottish League Cup)		Europe		Other		Total	
Club	Season	Division	Apps	Goals	Apps	Goals	Apps	Goals	Apps	Goals	Apps	Goals	Apps	Goals
Karlsruher II	2011–12	Regionalliga Süd	1	1	—		—		—		—		1	1
Nürnberg II	2012–13	Regionalliga Bayern	31	12	—		—		—		—		31	12
Nürnberg II	2013–14	Regionalliga Bayern	26	16	—		—		—		—		26	16
Nürnberg II	2014–15	Regionalliga Bayern	1	0	—		—		—		—		1	0
Nürnberg II	Total		58	28	—		—		—		—		58	28
Nürnberg	2013–14	Bundesliga	6	0	0	0	—		—		—		6	0
Nürnberg	2014–15	2. Bundesliga	1	0	0	0	—		—		—		1	0
Nürnberg	Total		7	0	0	0	—		—		—		7	0
Lechia Gdańsk (loan)	2014–15	Ekstraklasa	30	10	1	0	—		—		—		31	10
Hoffenheim	2015–16	Bundesliga	0	0	0	0	—		—		—		0	0
Kaiserslautern II (loan)	2015–16	Regionalliga Südwest	1	2	—		—		—		—		1	2
Kaiserslautern (loan)	2015–16	2. Bundesliga	22	5	2	0	—		—		—		24	5
Darmstadt (loan)	2016–17	Bundesliga	22	4	2	3	—		—		—		24	7
Ingolstadt II (loan)	2017–18	Regionalliga Bayern	1	1	—		—		—		—		1	1
Ingolstadt (loan)	2017–18	2. Bundesliga	6	0	2	0	—		—		—		8	0
Rijeka (loan)	2017–18	Prva HNL	16	6	0	0	—		0	0	—		16	6
Rijeka (loan)	2018–19	Prva HNL	24	12	5	7	—		2 (Note: Appearances in UEFA Europa League)	0	—		31	19
Rijeka	2019–20	Prva HNL	32	20	4	4	—		4	2	1 (Note: Appearance in Croatian Football Super Cup)	0	41	26
Rijeka	2020–21	Prva HNL	4	0	0	0	—		0	0	—		4	0
Rijeka	Total		76	38	9	11	—		6	2	1	0	92	51
PAOK	2020–21	Super League Greece	10	1	0	0	—		6 (Note: One appearance in UEFA Champions League, five appearances in UEFA Europa League)	0	—		16	1
PAOK	2021–22	Super League Greece	15	2	2	1	—		6 (Note: Appearances in UEFA Conference League)	0	—		23	3
PAOK	Total		25	3	2	1	—		12	0	—		39	4
Malmö FF (loan)	2021	Allsvenskan	26	14	1	3	—		14 (Note: Appearances in UEFA Champions League)	5	—		41	22
Rangers	2022–23	Scottish Premiership	25	14	3	1	1	0	10	3	—		39	18
Parma	2023–24	Serie B	22	3	0	0	—		—		—		22	3
Spezia	2024–25	Serie B	24	1	0	0	—		—		2 (Note: Appearances in Serie B promotion play-offs)	0	26	1
Legia Warsaw	2025–26	Ekstraklasa	13	3	1	0	—		6	1	—		20	4
Legia Warsaw	2026–27	Ekstraklasa	0	0	0	0	—		—		—		0	0
Legia Warsaw	Total		13	3	1	0	—		6	1	—		20	4
Legia Warsaw II	2026–27	II liga	1	1	—		—		—		—		1	1
Career total			360	128	23	19	1	0	48	11	3	0	436	158

=== International ===
As of match played 7 September 2021

Appearances and goals by national team and year
National team	Year	Apps	Goals
Croatia	2020	1	0
Croatia	2021	2	0
Total		3	0

== Honours ==
Rijeka

- Croatian Cup: 2018–19, 2019–20

Malmö FF

- Allsvenskan: 2021

PAOK

- Greek Cup runner-up: 2021–22

Rangers

- Scottish League Cup runner-up: 2022–23

Parma

- Serie B: 2023–24

Individual

- Croatian First Football League top scorer: 2019–20 (20 goals)
- Croatian Cup top scorer: 2018–19
