= 2019 Croatian Football Cup final =

- Event: 2018–19 Croatian Cup
Dinamo Zagreb	Rijeka
1	3
- Date: 22 May 2019
- Venue: Stadion Aldo Drosina, Pula
- Man of the Match: Zoran Kvržić
- Referee: Damir Batinić (Osijek)
- Attendance: 6,742

The 2019 Croatian Cup final between Dinamo Zagreb and Rijeka was played on 22 May 2019 in Pula.

== Road to the final ==
Dinamo Zagreb		Round	Rijeka	
Opponent	Result		Opponent	Result
bye		Preliminary round	bye	
Sloga Mravince	1–0	First round	Križevci	9–0
Zelina	4−0	Second round	Varaždin	2–1
Slaven Belupo	1–0	Quarter-finals	Lokomotiva	2–1
Osijek	2–0	Semi-finals	Inter Zaprešić	2–1

== Match details ==
22 May 2019
18:00

Dinamo Zagreb	1−3	Rijeka
Oršić 63'	Report	Čolak 13'; Halilović 39'; Kvržić 84'

Stadion Aldo Drosina, Pula
Attendance: 6,742
Referee: Damir Batinić (Osijek)

Dinamo Zagreb	Rijeka

DINAMO ZAGREB:
GK	40	(Croatia) Dominik Livaković
MF	5	(North Macedonia) Arijan Ademi (c)
MF	7	(Spain) Dani Olmo	(penalty missed) 74'
DF	13	(Kosovo) Amir Rrahmani		(substituted off) 46'
MF	20	(Nigeria) Iyayi Atiemwen		(substituted off) 46'
FW	21	(Croatia) Bruno Petković
DF	28	(France) Kévin Théophile-Catherine	(yellow card) 53'	(substituted off) 78'
DF	30	(Slovenia) Petar Stojanović
MF	34	(Croatia) Ivan Šunjić
DF	66	(Austria) Emir Dilaver
MF	99	(Croatia) Mislav Oršić
Substitutes:
GK	1	(Croatia) Danijel Zagorac
MF	8	(Bosnia and Herzegovina) Izet Hajrović		(substituted on) 78'
FW	11	(Switzerland) Mario Gavranović	(yellow card) 86'	(substituted on) 46'
DF	22	(Croatia) Marin Leovac		(substituted on) 46'
MF	27	(Croatia) Nikola Moro
DF	55	(Croatia) Dino Perić
MF	92	(Poland) Damian Kądzior
Manager:
(Croatia) Nenad Bjelica

RIJEKA:
GK	12	(Croatia) Simon Sluga
DF	4	(Croatia) Roberto Punčec
MF	6	(Croatia) Ivan Lepinjica		(substituted off) 75'
MF	7	(Bosnia and Herzegovina) Zoran Kvržić (c)
MF	8	(Croatia) Tibor Halilović		(substituted off) 80'
DF	13	(Croatia) Dario Župarić
FW	17	(Croatia) Antonio Čolak	(yellow card) 27'	(substituted off) 83'
MF	24	(Croatia) Domagoj Pavičić
DF	26	(Portugal) João Escoval
DF	27	(Croatia) Ivan Tomečak
MF	31	(Croatia) Luka Capan	(yellow card) 23'
Substitutes:
GK	32	(Croatia) Andrej Prskalo
DF	3	(Croatia) Petar Mamić
MF	14	(Ghana) Boadu Maxwell Acosty
FW	18	(Croatia) Robert Murić
FW	20	(Austria) Alexander Gorgon		(substituted on) 80'
FW	21	(Croatia) Jakov Puljić		(substituted on) 83'
MF	44	(Bosnia and Herzegovina) Stjepan Lončar		(substituted on) 75'
Manager:
(Croatia) Igor Bišćan

Assistant referees:
Tomislav Petrović (Valpovo)
Miro Grgić (Osijek)
Fourth official:
Goran Pataki (Đakovo)
Additional assistant referees:
Igor Pajač (Sveti Ivan Zelina)
Marko Matoc (Zaprešić)

Match rules

- 90 minutes.
- 30 minutes of extra-time if necessary.
- Penalty shoot-out if scores still level.
- Seven named substitutes.
- Maximum of three substitutions.
