= Nino Galović =

Croatian footballer (born 1992)

Personal information
- Date of birth: 6 July 1992 (age 34)
- Place of birth: Supetar, Croatia
- Height: 1.84 m (6 ft 0 in)
- Position: Centre-back

Youth career
- 2001–2009: Hajduk Split
- 2009–2011: RNK Split

Senior career*
Years	Team	Apps	(Gls)
2011–2016	RNK Split	83	(2)
2015	→ Slaven Belupo (loan)	11	(0)
2016	Ashdod	6	(0)
2017–2018	Dinamo Minsk	56	(6)
2019	Sagan Tosu	3	(0)
2019	→ Dinamo Minsk (loan)	14	(1)
2020–2021	Rijeka	51	(6)
2022–2025	Arouca	50	(0)

International career
2007	Croatia U15	1	(1)
2008	Croatia U16	4	(0)
2008	Croatia U17	1	(0)
2012	Croatia U20	2	(0)
2012–2014	Croatia U21	3	(0)
- * Club domestic league appearances and goals as of 17 May 2025

Nino Galović (born 6 July 1992) is a Croatian professional footballer who plays as a centre-back.

== Club career ==
On 10 September 2011, Galović made his professional debut playing against NK Varaždin where he started the match and played the whole 90 minutes. During his first senior year, he played only 9 games in total. During his second senior year, he became a starter and played every minute without a yellow card until winter break. After winter break he only played several more games under a new coach.

In the third season, he didn't start because of a minor injury. Later, through the season he managed to play 19 games. He became captain of RNK Split and led his team to the playoff phase of UEFA Europa League where they lost to Torino. Throughout the season he recorded 48 matches(33 leagues, 7 cups, 8 Europe), the most minutes in his team and the most minutes in the whole league.

On 7 July 2016 signed with F.C. Ashdod from Israeli Premier League. In Israel, Galovic played just 6 league matches and 4 Toto cup matches. After 7 months in FC Ashdod, he broke the contract.

On 9 January 2017, Nino signed with FC Dinamo Minsk. Galovic became club captain in his second year in Dinamo Minsk. He played a major role in Dinamo Minsk playing 84 games and scoring 11 times.

On 1 January 2019, he signed for the Japanese club Sagan Tosu, where he was a teammate with Fernando Torres. There he played only several games and after 8 months he returned to Dinamo Minsk on a half-season loan option.

After breaking the contract with Sagan Tosu, Nino signed with NK Rijeka on 28 January 2020. In Rijeka, Nino spent 2 years, where played over 65 games and scored 7 goals. During 2-year spell, he won the cup with NK Rijeka and participated in UEFA Europa League. During that time he also captained the team on a few occasions.

In January 2022, he signed with the Portuguese team Arouca.
