= 2000–01 HNK Hajduk Split season =

Hajduk Split
2000–01 season
- Chairman: Branko Grgić
- Manager: Petar Nadoveza; Zoran Vulić
- Prva HNL: 1st
- Croatian Cup: Runners-up
- Champions League: Second qualifying round
- Top goalscorer: League: Stanko Bubalo (14); All: Stanko Bubalo (21)
- Highest home attendance: 32,000 vs Dinamo Zagreb (14 April 2001)
- Lowest home attendance: 0 vs Marsonia (9 August 2000)
- Average home league attendance: 7,594

The 2000–01 season was the 90th season in Hajduk Split’s history and their tenth in the Prva HNL. Their 2nd place finish in the 1999–2000 season meant it was their 10th successive season playing in the Prva HNL.

== Competitions ==
=== Overall record ===
Performance by competition
Competition	Starting round	Final position/round	First match	Last match
Prva HNL	—N/a	Winners	6 August 2000	27 May 2001
Croatian Football Cup	First round	Runners-up	6 September 2000	23 May 2001
UEFA Champions League	Second qualifying round		26 July 2000	2 August 2000

Statistics by competition
Competition	Pld	W	D	L	GF	GA	GD	Win%
Prva HNL	32	20	6	6	66	23	+43	62.50
Croatian Football Cup	8	5	1	2	20	6	+14	62.50
UEFA Champions League	2	0	1	1	2	4	−2	0.00
Total	42	25	8	9	88	33	+55	59.52

=== Prva HNL ===
==== First stage ====
Pos	Team	Pld	W	D	L	GF	GA	GD	Pts	Qualification
1	Dinamo Zagreb	22	13	7	2	49	23	+26	46	Qualification to championship group
2	Osijek	22	13	5	4	49	28	+21	44	Qualification to championship group
3	Hajduk Split	22	12	5	5	39	16	+23	41	Qualification to championship group
4	NK Zagreb	22	10	4	8	43	38	+5	34	Qualification to championship group
5	Varteks	22	8	8	6	42	36	+6	32	Qualification to championship group

Source: RSSSF.org
Rules for classification: 1) points; 2) goal difference; 3) number of goals scored.

==== Second stage (championship play-off) ====
Pos	Team	Pld	W	D	L	GF	GA	GD	Pts	Qualification
1	Hajduk Split (C)	32	20	6	6	66	23	+43	66	Qualification to Champions League second qualifying round
2	Dinamo Zagreb	32	19	8	5	70	36	+34	65	Qualification to UEFA Cup qualifying round
3	Osijek	32	17	6	9	61	47	+14	57	Qualification to UEFA Cup qualifying round
4	Varteks	32	12	9	11	56	56	0	45	Qualification to UEFA Cup qualifying round
5	Slaven Belupo	32	11	11	10	39	37	+2	44	Qualification to Intertoto Cup first round
6	NK Zagreb	32	11	5	16	51	58	−7	38	Qualification to Intertoto Cup first round

Source: RSSSF.org
Rules for classification: 1) points; 2) goal difference; 3) number of goals scored.
(C) Champions

==== Results summary ====
Overall								Home						Away					
Pld	W	D	L	GF	GA	GD	Pts	W	D	L	GF	GA	GD	W	D	L	GF	GA	GD
32	20	6	6	66	23	+43	66	12	3	1	38	8	+30	8	3	5	28	15	+13

Last updated: 27 May 2001.
Source: Sportnet.hr

==== Results by round ====
Round	1	2	3	4	5	6	7	8	9	10	11	12	13	14	15	16	17	18	19	20	21	22	23	24	25	26	27	28	29	30	31	32
Ground	H	A	H	A	H	A	H	A	H	A	H	A	H	A	H	A	H	A	H	A	H	A	H	A	H	A	H	A	H	A	H	A
Result	W	W	W	L	D	D	L	W	W	L	D	W	W	L	W	W	W	L	W	D	D	W	W	D	W	W	W	W	W	L	W	W
Position	3	2	2	2	2	3	4	4	3	4	4	4	3	3	3	3	3	3	3	3	3	3	3	2	2	2	1	1	1	1	1	1

Source: Competitive matches
A = Away; H = Home; W = Win; D = Draw; L = Loss

==== Results by opponent ====
Team	1–22		23–32		Points
Team	1	2	1	2	Points
Čakovec	0–2	3–1	—	—	3
Cibalia	1–1	2–0	—	—	7
Dinamo Zagreb	0–1	2–3	3–1	0–1	3
Hrvatski Dragovoljac	3–1	4–0	—	—	6
Marsonia	2–0	5–0	—	—	6
Osijek	1–2	1–1	2–0	4–0	6
Rijeka	0–0	3–0	—	—	4
Slaven Belupo	2–1	0–2	1–1	1–0	3
Šibenik	0–0	3–0	—	—	4
Varteks	2–0	1–1	6–0	4–2	10
NK Zagreb	2–0	2–0	4–2	2–0	12

Source: 2000–01 Croatian First Football League article

== Matches ==
=== Prva HNL ===
==== First stage ====
6 August 2000 2	NK Zagreb	0–2	Hajduk Split	Zagreb
18:00 CEST (UTC+02:00)	Verhas (yellow card) 51' (yellow-red card) 54'	Report	Bilić 68'; I. Bošnjak 90'	Stadium: Stadion Kranjčevićeva; Attendance: 4,000; Referee: Miroslav Vitković (Vinkovci)

9 August 2000 1	Hajduk Split	2–0	Marsonia	Split
18:30 CEST (UTC+02:00)	Leko 5'; Bilić 42'	Report	Petrović (yellow card) 19' (yellow-red card) 90'	Stadium: Stadion Poljud; Attendance: 0 Referee: Dražen Komar (Zdenci Brdovečki)

13 August 2000 3	Hajduk Split	2–1	Slaven Belupo	Split
20:00 CEST (UTC+02:00)	Leko 27'; Božac 38'	Report	Geršak 55'	Stadium: Stadion Poljud; Attendance: 4,000; Referee: Ante Kulušić (Šibenik)

19 August 2000 4	Čakovec	2–0	Hajduk Split	Čakovec
17:00 CEST (UTC+02:00)	Škopljanac (red card) 48'; Demir (yellow card) 56' (yellow-red card) 80'; Bubek 69'; Caban 81'	Report	Puljiz (yellow card) 63' (yellow-red card) 84'	Stadium: Stadion SRC Mladost; Attendance: 6,000; Referee: Goran Marić (Zagreb)

27 August 2000 5	Hajduk Split	1–1	Cibalia	Split
19:00 CEST (UTC+02:00)	Sablić 90'	Report	Jurić 22'	Stadium: Stadion Poljud; Attendance: 3,000; Referee: Slavko Čulina (Zagreb)

9 September 2000 6	Rijeka	0–0	Hajduk Split	Rijeka
18:30 CEST (UTC+02:00)		Report		Stadium: Stadion Kantrida; Attendance: 6,000; Referee: Ivica Katuša (Čakovec)

19 September 2000 7	Hajduk Split	0–1	Dinamo Zagreb	Split
18:30 CEST (UTC+02:00)		Report	Drpić (yellow card) 25' (yellow-red card) 87'; Balaban 36'	Stadium: Stadion Poljud; Attendance: 17,000; Referee: Ivan Novak (Varaždin)

24 September 2000 8	Hrvatski Dragovoljac	1–3	Hajduk Split	Zagreb
16:00 CEST (UTC+02:00)	Dujmović (yellow card) 10' (yellow-red card) 70'; Katulić 29'	Report	I. Bošnjak 27'; Bilić 40'; Leko 45'	Stadium: Stadion NŠC Stjepan Spajić; Attendance: 2,500; Referee: Vlado Svilokos (Sisak)

30 September 2000 9	Hajduk Split	2–0	Varteks	Split
18:00 CEST (UTC+02:00)	I. Bošnjak 30'; Leko 59' (pen.)	Report	Madunović (red card) 25'	Stadium: Stadion Poljud; Attendance: 1,500; Referee: Ante Kulušić (Šibenik)

4 October 2000 10	Osijek	2–1	Hajduk Split	Osijek
20:00 CEST (UTC+02:00)	Bjelica 45'; Balatinac 90'	Report	Bubalo 85'	Stadium: Stadion Gradski vrt Attendance: 6,000; Referee: Goran Marić (Zagreb)

14 October 2000 11	Hajduk Split	0–0	Šibenik	Split
17:30 CEST (UTC+02:00)		Report		Stadium: Stadion Poljud; Attendance: 1,500; Referee: Goran Marić (Zagreb)

22 October 2000 12	Marsonia	0–5	Hajduk Split	Slavonski Brod
15:30 CEST (UTC+02:00)		Report	Miladin 28'; Leko 44' (red card) 85'; Musa 56'; Deranja 72'; Pletikosa 74' (pen.)	Stadium: Gradski stadion uz Savu; Attendance: 5,000; Referee: Draženko Kovačić (Križevci)

29 October 2000 13	Hajduk Split	2–0	NK Zagreb	Split
16:00 CET (UTC+01:00)	I. Bošnjak 7'; Bubalo 90'	Report		Stadium: Stadion Poljud; Attendance: 10,000; Referee: Vlado Svilokos (Sisak)

4 November 2000 14	Slaven Belupo	2–0	Hajduk Split	Koprivnica
14:00 CET (UTC+01:00)	Jurčec 46'; Dodik 85' (pen.)	Report	Miladin (yellow card) 16' (yellow-red card) 85'; Miše (yellow card) 26' (yellow-red card) 56'	Stadium: Gradski stadion Attendance: 3,500; Referee: Ivan Bebek (Rijeka)

12 November 2000 15	Hajduk Split	3–1	Čakovec	Split
16:00 CET (UTC+01:00)	Musa 39'; Bilić 52', 73'	Report	Petreski 83'	Stadium: Stadion Poljud; Attendance: 3,500; Referee: Nikola Petir (Kašina)

18 November 2000 16	Cibalia	0–2	Hajduk Split	Vinkovci
14:00 CET (UTC+01:00)		Report	Andrić 68'; Bubalo 85'	Stadium: Stadion HNK Cibalia; Attendance: 2,000; Referee: Šime Vukić (Rijeka)

26 November 2000 17	Hajduk Split	3–0	Rijeka	Split
16:00 CET (UTC+01:00)	Bubalo 37'; Leko 68' (pen.), 77'	Report	Horvat (red card) 64'	Stadium: Stadion Poljud; Attendance: 2,500; Referee: Slavko Čulina (Zagreb)

3 December 2000 18	Dinamo Zagreb	3–2	Hajduk Split	Zagreb
15:30 CET (UTC+01:00)	Balaban 12'; Šokota 67'; Gondžić 90'	Report	Deranja 68'; Miladin 69'	Stadium: Stadion Maksimir; Attendance: 15,000; Referee: Željko Širić (Osijek)

25 February 2001 19	Hajduk Split	4–0	Hrvatski Dragovoljac	Split
15:00 CET (UTC+01:00)	Vukojević 41' (o.g.); Leko 70'; Bubalo 75'; Deranja 90'	Report		Stadium: Stadion Poljud; Attendance: 2,000; Referee: Miroslav Vitković (Vinkovci)

4 March 2001 20	Varteks	1–1	Hajduk Split	Varaždin
15:00 CET (UTC+01:00)	Bjelanović 89'; Muka (red card) 90'	Report	Srna (yellow card) 5' (yellow-red card) 63'; Bubalo 52'	Stadium: Stadion Varteks; Attendance: 6,000; Referee: Željko Širić (Osijek)

10 March 2001 21	Hajduk Split	1–1	Osijek	Split
16:00 CET (UTC+01:00)	Deranja 20'	Report	Kukoč 82'	Stadium: Stadion Poljud; Attendance: 10,000; Referee: Ivan Novak (Varaždin)

18 March 2001 22	Šibenik	0–3	Hajduk Split	Šibenik
15:00 CET (UTC+01:00)		Report	Deranja 5'; Musa 82'; Bilić 87'	Stadium: Stadion Šubićevac; Attendance: 6,000; Referee: Slavko Čulina (Zagreb)

==== Championship play-off ====
31 March 2001 23	Hajduk Split	4–2	NK Zagreb	Split
16:00 CEST (UTC+02:00)	Deranja 18', 73'; I. Bošnjak 60'; Bubalo 85'	Report	Čižmek 21'; Franja 31'	Stadium: Stadion Poljud; Attendance: 4,000; Referee: Dražen Komar (Zdenci Brdovečki)

8 April 2001 24	Slaven Belupo	1–1	Hajduk Split	Koprivnica
15:00 CEST (UTC+02:00)	Posavec 81'	Report	Rendulić 76'	Stadium: Gradski stadion Attendance: 4,000; Referee: Goran Marić (Zagreb)

14 April 2001 25	Hajduk Split	3–1	Dinamo Zagreb	Split
17:30 CEST (UTC+02:00)	Bubalo 11', 30'; Musa 70'	Report	Sedloski 23'	Stadium: Stadion Poljud; Attendance: 32,000; Referee: Ivan Novak (Varaždin)

21 April 2001 26	Osijek	0–2	Hajduk Split	Osijek
16:00 CEST (UTC+02:00)		Report	Leko 6' (pen.); Deranja 61'	Stadium: Stadion Gradski vrt Attendance: 4,000; Referee: Ivan Novak (Varaždin)

29 April 2001 27	Hajduk Split	6–0	Varteks	Split
15:00 CEST (UTC+02:00)	Deranja 23'; I. Bošnjak 36'; Leko 41'; Bubalo 45'; Bilić 71', 74'	Report		Stadium: Stadion Poljud; Attendance: 10,000; Referee: Goran Marić (Zagreb)

2 May 2001 28	NK Zagreb	0–2	Hajduk Split	Zagreb
15:30 CEST (UTC+02:00)		Report	Bilić 28'; Leko 82'	Stadium: Stadion Kranjčevićeva; Attendance: 4,000; Referee: Željko Širić (Osijek)

6 May 2001 29	Hajduk Split	1–0	Slaven Belupo	Split
15:30 CEST (UTC+02:00)	Bubalo 15'	Report		Stadium: Stadion Poljud; Attendance: 10,000; Referee: Željko Širić (Osijek)

13 May 2001 30	Dinamo Zagreb	1–0	Hajduk Split	Zagreb
16:30 CEST (UTC+02:00)	Cvitanović 48'	Report		Stadium: Stadion Maksimir; Attendance: 25,000; Referee: Draženko Kovačić (Križevci)

19 May 2001 31	Hajduk Split	4–0	Osijek	Zadar
16:30 CEST (UTC+02:00)	Bubalo 15'; Bilić 73'; Deranja 85', 87'	Report	Turković (red card) 54'	Stadium: Stadion Stanovi; Attendance: 12,000; Referee: Draženko Kovačić (Križevci)

27 May 2001 32	Varteks	2–4	Hajduk Split	Varaždin
16:30 CEST (UTC+02:00)	Karić 20' (pen.); Bjelanović 28'	Report	Leko 12', 26' (pen.); Bubalo 35', 62'	Stadium: Stadion Varteks; Attendance: 10,000; Referee: Goran Marić (Zagreb)

Source: hajduk.hr

=== Croatian Football Cup ===
6 September 2000 R1	Lokomotiva Vinkovci	1–8	Hajduk Split	Vinkovci
16:30 CEST (UTC+02:00)	Plavšić 14' (pen.)	Report	Leko 21', 77' (pen.); Bubalo 22', 74', 90'; Grdic 59'; Božac 62'; I. Bošnjak 79'	Stadium: Lenije; Attendance: 1,000; Referee: Željko Širić (Osijek)

17 October 2000 R2	Hajduk Split	1–0	Čakovec	Split
17:00 CEST (UTC+02:00)	Bilić 90+3'	Report		Stadium: Stadion Poljud; Attendance: 1,000; Referee: Draženko Kovačić (Križevci)

6 March 2001 QF	Hrvatski Dragovoljac	2–2	Hajduk Split	Zagreb
15:30 CET (UTC+01:00)	S. Bošnjak 11'; Fumić 84' (pen.)	Report	Deranja 14', 90+2'	Stadium: Stadion NŠC Stjepan Spajić; Attendance: 2,000; Referee: Željko Širić (Osijek)

14 March 2001 QF	Hajduk Split	5–0 (7–2 agg.)	Hrvatski Dragovoljac	Split
16:00 CET (UTC+01:00)	Bubalo 16', 54', 74', 89'; Deranja 25'	Report		Stadium: Stadion Poljud; Attendance: 1,500; Referee: Ivan Bebek (Rijeka)

11 April 2001 SF	Osijek	0–3	Hajduk Split	Osijek
17:00 CEST (UTC+02:00)		Report	Bilić 43', 84'; I. Bošnjak 53'	Stadium: Stadion Gradski vrt Attendance: 4,000; Referee: Draženko Kovačić (Križevci)

18 April 2001 SF	Hajduk Split	1–0 (4–0 agg.)	Osijek	Split
17:00 CEST (UTC+02:00)	Gjuzelov 9'	Report		Stadium: Stadion Poljud; Attendance: 2,500; Referee: Goran Marić (Zagreb)

9 May 2001 Final	Hajduk Split	0–2	Dinamo Zagreb	Split
17:30 CEST (UTC+02:00)		Report	Šokota 40'; Mikić 57'	Stadium: Stadion Poljud; Attendance: 28,000; Referee: Draženko Kovačić (Križevci)

23 May 2001 Final	Dinamo Zagreb	1–0 (3–0 agg.)	Hajduk Split	Zagreb
17:30 CEST (UTC+02:00)	Pilipović 16'; Sedloski (red card) 70'	Report		Stadium: Stadion Maksimir; Attendance: 15,000; Referee: Željko Širić (Osijek)

Source: hajduk.hr

=== Champions League ===
==== Second qualifying round ====
26 July 2000 First leg	Hajduk Split (Croatia)	0–2	(Hungary) Dunaferr	Split, Croatia
20:15 CEST (UTC+02:00)		Report	Tököli 57'; Éger 90+3'	Stadium: Stadion Poljud; Attendance: 16,000; Referee: Cosimo Bolognino (Italy)

2 August 2000 Second leg	Dunaferr (Hungary)	2–2 (4–2 agg.)	(Croatia) Hajduk Split	Győr, Hungary
20:45 CEST (UTC+02:00)	Zavadszky 20'; Tököli 87'	Report	Bilić 9', 28'	Stadium: Stadion ETO; Attendance: 10,750; Referee: Dermot Gallagher (England)

Source: hajduk.hr

== Player seasonal records ==
=== Top scorers ===
Rank	Name	League	Europe	Cup	Total
1	(Croatia) Stanko Bubalo	14	–	7	21
2	(Croatia) Mate Bilić	10	2	3	15
2	(Croatia) Ivan Leko	13	–	2	15
4	(Croatia) Zvonimir Deranja	11	–	3	14
5	(Croatia) Ivan Bošnjak	6	–	2	8
6	(Croatia) Igor Musa	4	–	–	4
6	(Croatia) Darko Miladin	2	–	–	4
8	(Croatia) Dalibor Božac	1	–	1	2
9	(Croatia) Srđan Andrić	1	–	–	1
9	(North Macedonia) Igor Gjuzelov	–	–	1	1
9	(Australia) Anthony Grdic	–	–	1	1
9	(Croatia) Stipe Pletikosa	1	–	–	1
9	(Croatia) Krunoslav Rendulić	1	–	–	1
9	(Croatia) Goran Sablić	1	–	–	1
	Own goals	1	–	–	1
	TOTALS	66	2	20	88

Source: Competitive matches

== See also ==
- 2000–01 Croatian First Football League
- 2000–01 Croatian Football Cup

== External sources ==
- 2000–01 Prva HNL at HRnogomet.com
- 2000–01 Croatian Cup at HRnogomet.com
- 2000–01 UEFA Champions League at rsssf.com
