= 2001 Croatian Football Cup final =

- Event: 2000–01 Croatian Cup
Hajduk Split	Dinamo Zagreb
0	3

First leg
Hajduk Split	Dinamo Zagreb
0	2
- Date: 9 May 2001
- Venue: Stadion Poljud, Split
- Man of the Match: Tomo Šokota (Dinamo Zagreb)
- Referee: Draženko Kovačić (Križevci)
- Attendance: 28,000
- Weather: Cloudy

Second leg
Dinamo Zagreb	Hajduk Split
1	0
- Date: 23 May 2001
- Venue: Stadion Maksimir, Zagreb
- Man of the Match: Mihael Mikić (Dinamo Zagreb)
- Referee: Željko Širić (Osijek)
- Attendance: 15,000
- Weather: Clear

The 2001 Croatian Cup final was a two-legged affair played between Hajduk Split and Dinamo Zagreb. The first leg was played in Split on 9 May 2001, while the second leg on 23 May 2001 in Zagreb.

Dinamo Zagreb won the trophy with an aggregate result of 3–0.

== Road to the final ==
Hajduk Split		Round	Dinamo Zagreb	
Opponent	Result		Opponent	Result
Lokomotiva Vinkovci	8–1	First round	Mladost Molve	9–0
Čakovec	1–0	Second round	Šibenik	2–0
Hrvatski Dragovoljac	2–2	Quarter-finals	Kamen Ingrad	4–0
Hrvatski Dragovoljac	5–0	Quarter-finals	Kamen Ingrad	3–2
Osijek	3–0	Semi-finals	NK Zagreb	0–1
Osijek	1–0	Semi-finals	NK Zagreb	4–1

== First leg ==
9 May 2001
17:30

Hajduk Split	0–2	Dinamo Zagreb
	Report (in Croatian)	Šokota 40'; Mikić 57'

Stadion Poljud, Split
Attendance: 28,000
Referee: Draženko Kovačić (Križevci)

HAJDUK SPLIT:
GK	1	(Croatia) Stipe Pletikosa
DF	2	(North Macedonia) Igor Gjuzelov
DF	5	(Croatia) Goran Sablić		(substituted off) 68'
DF	21	(Croatia) Darko Miladin
DF	29	(Bosnia and Herzegovina) Ivan Radeljić
DF	30	(Croatia) Krunoslav Rendulić		(substituted off) 58'
MF	7	(Croatia) Stanko Bubalo		(substituted off) 58'
MF	8	(Croatia) Igor Musa
MF	10	(Croatia) Ivan Leko (c)
FW	11	(Croatia) Zvonimir Deranja
FW	12	(Croatia) Ivan Bošnjak
Substitutes:
MF	26	(Croatia) Mario Carević	(yellow card) 86'	(substituted on) 58'
FW	9	(Croatia) Mate Bilić		(substituted on) 58'
MF	14	(Croatia) Srđan Andrić		(substituted on) 68'
Manager:
(Croatia) Zoran Vulić

DINAMO ZAGREB:
GK	1	(Croatia) Tomislav Butina
DF	2	(Croatia) Mario Tokić	(yellow card) 86'
DF	4	(North Macedonia) Goce Sedloski
DF	5	(Croatia) Kristijan Polovanec
DF	13	(Australia) Eddy Bosnar
MF	7	(Croatia) Mihael Mikić
MF	8	(Croatia) Jasmin Agić
MF	27	(Croatia) Renato Pilipović
FW	14	(Croatia) Dario Zahora		(substituted off) 66'
FW	21	(Croatia) Igor Cvitanović		(substituted off) 61'
FW	25	(Croatia) Tomo Šokota (c)	(yellow card) 40'	(substituted off) 86'
Substitutes:
MF		(Croatia) Mario Bazina		(substituted on) 61'
MF		(Brazil) Alexandre	(yellow card) 85'	(substituted on) 66'
FW		(Croatia) Tomislav Gondžić		(substituted on) 86'
Manager:
(Croatia) Ilija Lončarević

Assistant referees:
Darko Slivar (Valpovo)
Darko Kolić (Sibinj)

Match rules

- 90 minutes.
- Seven named substitutes.
- Maximum of three substitutions.

== Second leg ==
23 May 2001
17:30

Dinamo Zagreb	1–0	Hajduk Split
Pilipović 16'	Report (in Croatian)

Stadion Maksimir, Zagreb
Attendance: 15,000
Referee: Željko Širić (Osijek)

DINAMO ZAGREB:
GK	1	(Croatia) Tomislav Butina
DF	2	(Croatia) Mario Tokić
DF	4	(North Macedonia) Goce Sedloski	(red card) 70'
DF	5	(Croatia) Kristijan Polovanec
DF	17	(Croatia) Boris Leutar
MF	7	(Croatia) Mihael Mikić
MF	8	(Croatia) Jasmin Agić	(yellow card) 65'
MF	16	(Croatia) Jerko Leko
MF	27	(Croatia) Renato Pilipović		(substituted off) 75'
FW	21	(Croatia) Igor Cvitanović		(substituted off) 78'
FW	25	(Croatia) Tomo Šokota (c)		(substituted off) 81'
Substitutes:
FW	14	(Croatia) Dario Zahora		(substituted on) 75'
MF		(Croatia) Mario Bazina		(substituted on) 78'
FW	9	(Croatia) Niko Kranjčar		(substituted on) 81'
Manager:
(Croatia) Ilija Lončarević

HAJDUK SPLIT:
GK	1	(Croatia) Stipe Pletikosa (c)
DF	4	(Croatia) Dalibor Božac
DF	20	(Croatia) Vik Lalić
DF	24	(Croatia) Jurica Puljiz
DF	29	(Bosnia and Herzegovina) Ivan Radeljić
MF	3	(Bosnia and Herzegovina) Mirko Hrgović	(yellow card) 39'	(substituted off) 85'
MF	8	(Croatia) Igor Musa
MF	14	(Croatia) Srđan Andrić	(yellow card) 79'	(substituted off) 80'
MF	26	(Croatia) Mario Carević
MF	27	(Croatia) Duje Špalj		(substituted off) 71'
FW	9	(Croatia) Mate Bilić
Substitutes:
MF		(Croatia) Igor Bilokapić		(substituted on) 71'
MF		(Croatia) Ivan Grivičić		(substituted on) 80'
MF	15	(Croatia) Ivan Rajčić		(substituted on) 85'
Manager:
(Croatia) Zoran Vulić

Assistant referees:
Matija Strugačevac (Belišće)
Darko Slivar (Valpovo)

Match rules

- 90 minutes.
- Penalty shoot-out if scores still level; no extra time.
- Seven named substitutes.
- Maximum of three substitutions.
