= 1998–99 NK Croatia Zagreb season =

Croatia Zagreb
1998–99 season
- President: Zlatko Canjuga
- Manager: Zlatko Kranjčar (until 24 October); Velimir Zajec (25 October to 21 April); Ilija Lončarević (from 22 April)
- Stadium: Stadion Maksimir
- 1. HNL: 1st (5th title)
- Croatian Cup: First round
- Champions League: Group stage
- Top goalscorer: Edin Mujčin (10)

During the 1998–99 Croatian football season, Croatia Zagreb competed in the Prva HNL.

== Season summary ==
Croatia Zagreb made their debut in the Champions League group stage, drawn against Olympiakos, Porto and Ajax. Zagreb failed to win any of their first three group games, resulting in the departure of manager Zlatko Kranjčar. His replacement, Velimir Zajec, inspired a turnaround and wins against Porto and Ajax gave the club hope of reaching the quarter-finals. A home draw with Olympiakos in the final group stage match saw Croatia Zagreb finish second in their group, but as they were the lowest-ranked of all the group stage runners-up they did not progress.

In the first round of the Croatian Football Cup the club was sensationally knocked out by fourth-level amateur side NK Dugo Selo 3–2.

In the league, Croatia was unbeaten in the first 11 matches of the season. Their first defeat came in November against Rijeka. They ended the first stage of the championship in March on top of the table, with a single point ahead of Rijeka, and 11 points ahead of their biggest rivals Hajduk Split in third place.

In the championship playoff, played as a round-robin mini-league involving top six teams from the first stage, Croatia finished on top, winning their fifth Croatian title since the country's independence, and ninth national title overall.

== First-team squad ==
Squad at end of season

Note: Flags indicate national team as defined under FIFA eligibility rules; some limited exceptions apply. Players may hold more than one non-FIFA nationality.

| No. | Pos. | Nation | Player |
|---|---|---|---|
| 12 | GK | CRO | Tomislav Butina |
| 1 | GK | CRO | Dražen Ladić |
| 30 | GK | CRO | Ivan Turina |
| 23 | GK | CRO | Vladimir Vasilj |
| 17 | DF | CRO | Mario Cvitanović |
| 5 | DF | CRO | Goran Jurić |
| 3 | DF | CRO | Damir Krznar |
| 11 | DF | CRO | Tomislav Rukavina |
| 15 | DF | CRO | Daniel Šarić |
| 6 | DF | CRO | Danijel Štefulj |
| 2 | DF | CRO | Mario Tokić |
| 20 | DF | CRO | Stjepan Tomas |
| 4 | DF | MKD | Goce Sedloski |
| 19 | MF | CRO | Mario Bazina |

| No. | Pos. | Nation | Player |
|---|---|---|---|
| 22 | MF | CRO | Igor Bišćan |
| 21 | MF | CRO | Joško Jeličić |
| 24 | MF | CRO | Krunoslav Jurčić |
| 14 | MF | CRO | Mihael Mikić |
| 8 | MF | CRO | Robert Prosinečki |
| 10 | MF | BIH | Edin Mujčin |
| 7 | MF | BIH | Nermin Šabić |
| 28 | FW | CRO | Domagoj Abramović |
| 26 | FW | CRO | Ardian Kozniku |
| 16 | FW | CRO | Josip Šimić |
| 25 | FW | CRO | Tomo Šokota |
| 9 | FW | LTU | Gražvydas Mikulėnas |
| 13 | FW | JPN | Kazuyoshi Miura |

=== Left club during season ===
Note: Flags indicate national team as defined under FIFA eligibility rules; some limited exceptions apply. Players may hold more than one non-FIFA nationality.

| No. | Pos. | Nation | Player |
|---|---|---|---|
| 4 | MF | CRO | Silvio Marić (to Newcastle United) |
| 9 | FW | AUS | Mark Viduka (to Celtic) |
| 13 | DF | CRO | Dario Šimić (to Inter) |

== Competitions ==
=== 1. HNL ===
==== First stage (Rounds 1–22) ====
| 7 August 1998 1 | Croatia Zagreb | 4–1 | Šibenik | Zagreb |
| | Marić 11', 53'; Jeličić 36'; D. Šimić 45' | | Popović 62' | Stadium: Maksimir |

| 16 August 1998 2 | Zadarkomerc | 1–1 | Croatia Zagreb | Zadar |
| | Zupan 67' | | Jurčić 62' | Stadium: Stanovi |

| 20 August 1998 3 | Croatia Zagreb | 4–2 | Osijek | Zagreb |
| | Jeličić 45', 71'; D. Šimić 47'; Šokota 62' | | Perković 38'; Tadić 75' | Stadium: Maksimir |

| 30 August 1998 4 | Croatia Zagreb | 2–1 | Hrvatski Dragovoljac | Zagreb |
| | Marić 53'; Šokota 73' | | Bošnjak 16' | Stadium: Maksimir |

| 11 September 1998 5 | Mladost 127 | 0–4 | Croatia Zagreb | Suhopolje |
| | | | Mujčin 15', 18'; Viduka 60'; Mikić 85' | Stadium: Park |

| 20 September 1998 6 | Croatia Zagreb | 2–1 | Cibalia | Zagreb |
| | Mujčin 20' (pen.); Šarić 42' | | Jurčec 57' | Stadium: Maksimir |

| 25 September 1998 7 | Slaven Belupo | 0–1 | Croatia Zagreb | Koprivnica |
| | | | Marić 39' | Stadium: Gradski stadion |

| 4 October 1998 8 | Croatia Zagreb | 2–0 | Varteks | Zagreb |
| | Šokota 35'; Krznar 61' | | | Stadium: Maksimir |

| 25 October 1998 10 | Croatia Zagreb | 4–0 | NK Zagreb | Zagreb |
| | Mujčin 2' (pen.), 9', 59' (pen.); Marić 86' | | | Stadium: Maksimir |

| 1 November 1998 11 | Hajduk Split | 1–1 | Croatia Zagreb | Split |
| | Leko 49' | | Viduka 9' | Stadium: Poljud |

| 7 November 1998 12 | Šibenik | 1–2 | Croatia Zagreb | Šibenik |
| | Bulat 72' | | Viduka 65' (75) | Stadium: Šubićevac |

| 11 November 1998 9 | Rijeka | 1–0 | Croatia Zagreb | Rijeka |
| | Ivančić ?' | | | Stadium: Kantrida |

| 14 November 1998 13 | Croatia Zagreb | 4–0 | Zadarkomerc | Zagreb |
| | Mujčin 20', 49'; Mikić 39'; Jeličić 58' | | | Stadium: Maksimir |

| 21 November 1998 14 | Osijek | 0–1 | Croatia Zagreb | Osijek |
| | | | Jeličić 61' | Stadium: Gradski Vrt |

| 29 November 1998 15 | Hrvatski Dragovoljac | 1–0 | Croatia Zagreb | Zagreb |
| | | | | Stadium: Siget |

| 14 December 1998 17 | Cibalia | 0–1 | Croatia Zagreb | Vinkovci |
| | | | Kozniku ?' | Stadium: Stadion HNK Cibalia |

| 17 February 1999 16 | Croatia Zagreb | 3–0 | Mladost 127 | Zagreb |
| | Jeličić ?'; Mikulėnas ?'; Mikić ?' | | | Stadium: Maksimir |

| 21 February 1999 18 | Croatia Zagreb | 2–1 | Slaven Belupo | Zagreb |
| | Mikulėnas ?'; Jurčić ?' | | Drvosek ?' | Stadium: Maksimir |

| 26 February 1999 19 | Varteks | 2–0 | Croatia Zagreb | Varaždin |
| | Posavec ?'; Karić ?' | | | Stadium: Stadion Varteks |

| 7 March 1999 20 | Croatia Zagreb | 3–0 | Rijeka | Zagreb |
| | Mujčin 4'; Bišćan 22'; Prosinečki 62' (pen.) | | | Stadium: Maksimir |

| 14 March 1999 21 | NK Zagreb | 1–2 | Croatia Zagreb | Zagreb |
| | Kosić 90' | | Prosinečki 18'; Mikulėnas 72' | Stadium: Kranjčevićeva |

| 21 March 1999 22 | Croatia Zagreb | 1–0 | Hajduk Split | Zagreb |
| | M. Cvitanović 76' | | | Stadium: Maksimir |

==== Standings ====
| Pos | Team | Pld | W | D | L | GF | GA | GD | Pts | Qualification |
|---|---|---|---|---|---|---|---|---|---|---|
| 1 | Croatia Zagreb | 22 | 17 | 2 | 3 | 44 | 14 | +30 | 53 | Qualification to championship group |
| 2 | Rijeka | 22 | 17 | 1 | 4 | 35 | 18 | +17 | 52 | Qualification to championship group |
| 3 | Hajduk Split | 22 | 12 | 6 | 4 | 38 | 17 | +21 | 42 | Qualification to championship group |
| 4 | Osijek | 22 | 11 | 3 | 8 | 37 | 23 | +14 | 36 | Qualification to championship group |
| 5 | Varteks | 22 | 9 | 3 | 10 | 40 | 36 | +4 | 30 | Qualification to championship group |

Source: RSSSF.org
Rules for classification: 1st points; 2nd head-to-head points; 3rd head-to-head goal difference; 4th head-to-head away goals scored

==== Championship playoff (Rounds 23–32) ====
| 18 April 1999 1 | Croatia Zagreb | 1–0 | Hrvatski Dragovoljac | Zagreb |
| | Mujčin 41' | | | Stadium: Maksimir |

| 21 April 1999 2 | Croatia Zagreb | 0–1 | Rijeka | Zagreb |
| | | | Balaban 14' | Stadium: Maksimir |

| 25 April 1999 3 | Hajduk Split | 1–0 | Croatia Zagreb | Split |
| | Erceg 66' | | | Stadium: Poljud |

| 2 May 1999 4 | Croatia Zagreb | 1–1 | Osijek | Zagreb |
| | Prosinečki 74' (pen.) | | Vuica 4' | Stadium: Maksimir |

| 9 May 1999 5 | Varteks | 1–2 | Croatia Zagreb | Varaždin |
| | Kamberović 4' | | Mikić 2'; Jurčić 74' | Stadium: Stadion Varteks |

| 12 May 1999 6 | Hrvatski Dragovoljac | 1–1 | Croatia Zagreb | Slavonski Brod |
| | Jazić 29' | | Prosinečki 60' (pen.) | Stadium: Vlainić-Dida |

| 16 May 1999 7 | Rijeka | 0–2 | Croatia Zagreb | Rijeka |
| | | | Bišćan 5'; Šokota 84' | Stadium: Kantrida |

| 19 May 1999 8 | Croatia Zagreb | 1–1 | Hajduk Split | Zagreb |
| | J. Šimić 26' | | Vuković 56' | Stadium: Maksimir |

| 23 May 1999 9 | Osijek | 0–1 | Croatia Zagreb | Osijek |
| | | | Kozniku 84' | Stadium: Gradski Vrt |

| 26 May 1999 10 | Croatia Zagreb | 2–0 | Varteks | Zagreb |
| | J. Šimić 20'; Kozniku 79' | | | Stadium: Maksimir |

==== Standings ====
| Pos | Team | Pld | W | D | L | GF | GA | GD | Pts | Qualification |
|---|---|---|---|---|---|---|---|---|---|---|
| 1 | Croatia Zagreb (C) | 10 | 5 | 3 | 2 | 11 | 6 | +5 | 45 | Qualification to Champions League third qualifying round |
| 2 | Rijeka | 10 | 5 | 3 | 2 | 18 | 15 | +3 | 44 | Qualification to Champions League second qualifying round |
| 3 | Hajduk Split | 10 | 5 | 3 | 2 | 24 | 15 | +9 | 39 | Qualification to UEFA Cup qualifying round |
| 4 | Osijek | 10 | 3 | 3 | 4 | 14 | 16 | −2 | 30 | Qualification to UEFA Cup first round |
| 5 | Hrvatski Dragovoljac | 10 | 3 | 1 | 6 | 15 | 21 | −6 | 23 | Qualification to Intertoto Cup first round |
| 6 | Varteks | 10 | 2 | 1 | 7 | 10 | 19 | −9 | 22 | Qualification to Intertoto Cup first round |

Source: RSSSF.org
Rules for classification: 1st points; 2nd head-to-head points; 3rd head-to-head goal difference; 4th head-to-head away goals scored
(C) Champions

=== Croatian Cup ===
| 8 September 1998 Round of 32 | Dugo Selo (IV) | 3–2 | Croatia Zagreb | Dugo Selo |
| | Benkoci 48'; Rukavina 75' (o.g.); Car 88' | | Viduka 17'; Šokota 45' | Stadium: Gradski stadion Attendance: 2,000; Referee: Miro Martinović (Osijek) |

=== UEFA Champions League ===
==== Second qualifying round ====
| 12 August 1998 1st leg | Celtic (Scotland) | 1–0 | Croatia Zagreb | Glasgow |
| 20:45 CET (UTC+01:00) | Jackson 50' | Report | | Stadium: Celtic Park; Attendance: 51,335; Referee: José María García-Aranda |

| 26 August 1998 2nd leg | Dinamo Zagreb (Croatia) | 3–0 (3–1 agg.) | (Scotland) Celtic | Zagreb |
| 20:30 CET (UTC+01:00) | Marić 22'; Prosinečki 45' (pen.), 68' | Report | | Stadium: Maksimir; Attendance: 23,570; Referee: Pierluigi Collina |

==== Group stage ====
| 16 September 1998 Matchday 1 | Croatia Zagreb | 0–0 | (Netherlands) Ajax | Zagreb |
| 20:45 | | Report | | Stadium: Maksimir; Attendance: 28,000; Referee: Kim Milton Nielsen |

| 30 September 1998 Matchday 2 | Olympiacos (Greece) | 2–0 | Croatia Zagreb | Athens |
| | Alexandris 21'; Gogić 80' | Report | | Stadium: Spiridon Louis; Attendance: 60,502; Referee: David Elleray |

| 21 October 1998 Matchday 3 | Porto (Portugal) | 3–0 | Croatia Zagreb | Porto |
| | Doriva 33'; Zahovič 42', 75' | Report | | Stadium: Estádio das Antas; Attendance: 16,500; Referee: Günter Benkö |

| 4 November 1998 Matchday 4 | Croatia Zagreb | 3–1 | (Portugal) Porto | Zagreb |
| | Mikić 7'; Rukavina 37'; Mujčin 61' | Report | Jardel 39' | Stadium: Maksimir; Attendance: 10,000; Referee: Markus Merk |

| 25 November 1998 Matchday 5 | Ajax (Netherlands) | 0–1 | Croatia Zagreb | Amsterdam |
| | | Report | J. Šimić 67' | Stadium: Amsterdam ArenA; Attendance: 48,000; Referee: Marc Batta |

| 9 December 1998 Matchday 6 | Croatia Zagreb | 1–1 | (Greece) Olympiacos | Zagreb |
| | Jeličić 35' | Report | Giannakopoulos 64' | Stadium: Maksimir; Attendance: 16,546; Referee: Rune Pedersen |

==== Standings ====
| Pos | Team | Pld | W | D | L | GF | GA | GD | Pts | Qualification |
|---|---|---|---|---|---|---|---|---|---|---|
| 1 | (Greece) Olympiacos | 6 | 3 | 2 | 1 | 8 | 6 | +2 | 11 | Advance to knockout stage |
| 2 | Croatia Zagreb | 6 | 2 | 2 | 2 | 5 | 7 | −2 | 8 | |
| 3 | (Portugal) Porto | 6 | 2 | 1 | 3 | 11 | 9 | +2 | 7 | |
| 4 | (Netherlands) Ajax | 6 | 2 | 1 | 3 | 4 | 6 | −2 | 7 | |

Source: UEFA
