= 2000–01 Croatian Football Cup =

Tournament details
- Country: Croatia
- Teams: 48

Final positions
- Champions: Dinamo Zagreb (5th title)
- Runners-up: Hajduk Split

Tournament statistics
- Matches played: 53
- Goals scored: 200 (3.77 per match)
- Top goal scorer: Stanko Bubalo (7)

The 2000–01 Croatian Football Cup was the tenth edition of Croatia's football knockout competition. Hajduk Split were the defending champions, and it was won by Dinamo Zagreb.

== Calendar ==
Round	Main date	Number of fixtures	Clubs	New entries this round
Preliminary round	13–15 August 2000	16	48 → 32	none
First round	3–6 September 2000	16	32 → 16	16
Second round	17–24 October 2000	8	16 → 8	none
Quarter-finals	6–7 and 14 March 2001	8	8 → 4	none
Semi-finals	11 and 18 April 2001	4	4 → 2	none
Final	9 and 23 May 2000	2	2 → 1	none

== Preliminary round ==
Tie no	Home team	Score	Away team
1	TVIN Virovitica	3–4	Lokomotiva Vinkovci
2	Vukovar '91	1–2	Mladost Molve
3	Bjelovar	2–3	TŠK Topolovac
4	Mosor	0–1	Metalac Osijek
5	Valpovka	5–1	Oštrc Zlatar
6	Orijent	4–3	Jadran Ploče
7	Junak Sinj	4–1	Gospić
8	MIV Sračinec	2–3	Hrašće Promil
9	Rovinj	2–3	Čakovec
10	Sloboda Varaždin	3–2	NOŠK Novigrad
11	Stupnik	2–3	Kamen Ingrad
12	Sloga Čakovec	0–1	PIK Vrbovec
13	Koprivnica	4–3	Moslavina
14	Zagora Unešić	2–4	Karlovac
15	Marsonia	4–0	Žminj
16	Sloga Nova Gradiška	1–0	Croatia Sesvete

== First round ==
Tie no	Home team	Score	Away team
1	Dragovoljac Hrašće	1–4	Osijek
2	Čakovec	2–1	Marsonia
3	Kamen Ingrad	2–0	Rijeka
4	Lokomotiva Vinkovci	1–8	Hajduk Split
5	Junak Sinj	1–3	Varteks
6	Sloga Nova Gradiška	0–5	NK Zagreb
7	Valpovka	1–4	Cibalia
8	Osijek Koteks	1–1 (aet) (1–4 p)	Slaven Belupo
9	Karlovac	1–1 (aet) (5–6 p)	Zadar
10	TŠK Topolovac	2–3 (aet)	Inker Zaprešić
11	Sloboda Varaždin	1–2 (aet)	Segesta
12	PIK Vrbovec	4–2	Belišće
13	Orijent	3–2 (aet)	Dubrovnik
14	Koprivnica	1–4	Hrvatski Dragovoljac
15	Mladost Molve	0–9	Dinamo Zagreb
16	Šibenik	w.o.	Mladost 127

== Second round ==
Tie no	Home team	Score	Away team
1	Hajduk Split	1–0	Čakovec
2	Inter Zaprešić	1–0 (aet)	Cibalia
3	PIK Vrbovec	0–4	Varteks
4	Zadar	1–2	Kamen Ingrad
5	Segesta	0–2	NK Zagreb
6	Slaven Belupo	0–0 (aet) (3–4 p)	Hrvatski Dragovoljac
7	Orijent	0–1	Osijek
8	Croatia Zagreb	2–0	Šibenik

== Quarter-finals ==
Team 1	Agg.	Team 2	1st leg	2nd leg
NK Zagreb	3–3 (4–2 p)	Varteks	3–0	0–3
Osijek	5–1	Inker Zaprešić	4–0	1–1
Hrvatski Dragovoljac	2–7	Hajduk Split	2–2	0–5
Kamen Ingrad	2–7	Dinamo Zagreb	0–4	2–3

== Semi-finals ==
11 April 2001
16:00

NK Zagreb	1–0	Dinamo Zagreb
Popović 64'	Report

Stadion Kranjčevićeva, Zagreb
Attendance: 1,500
Referee: Željko Širić (Osijek)
18 April 2001
17:00

Dinamo Zagreb	4–1	NK Zagreb
Mikić 7'; Balaban 11'; Sedloski 53'; Šokota 56'	Report	Čačić 88'

Stadion Maksimir, Zagreb
Attendance: 2,500
Referee: Draženko Kovačić (Križevci)

Dinamo Zagreb won 4–2 on aggregate.

11 April 2001
17:00

Osijek	0–3	Hajduk Split
	Report	Bilić 43', 84'; Bošnjak 53'

Stadion Gradski vrt, Osijek
Attendance: 4,000
Referee: Draženko Kovačić (Križevci)
18 April 2001
17:00

Hajduk Split	1–0	Osijek
Gjuzelov 9'	Report

Stadion Poljud, Split
Attendance: 2,500
Referee: Goran Marić (Zagreb)

Hajduk Split won 4–0 on aggregate.

== Final ==
=== First leg ===
9 May 2001
17:30

Hajduk Split	0–2	Dinamo Zagreb
	Report (in Croatian)	Šokota 40'; Mikić 57'

Stadion Poljud, Split
Attendance: 28,000
Referee: Draženko Kovačić (Križevci)

=== Second leg ===
23 May 2001
17:30

Dinamo Zagreb	1–0	Hajduk Split
Pilipović 16'	Report (in Croatian)

Stadion Maksimir, Zagreb
Attendance: 15,000
Referee: Željko Širić (Osijek)

Dinamo Zagreb won 3–0 on aggregate.

== See also ==
- 2000–01 Croatian First Football League
- 2000–01 Croatian Second Football League
