= List of Croatian football transfers summer 2017 =

This is a list of Croatian football transfers in the 2016 summer transfer window by club. Only clubs in the Hrvatski Telekom Prva liga are included.

== Croatian First Football League ==
=== Cibalia ===
In:

No.	Pos.	Nation	Player
5	DF	CRO	Marko Karamarko (from Osijek)
8	DF	CRO	Frane Ikić (from (Slovenia) Koper)
13	MF	CRO	Zvonimir Filipović (on loan from Osijek)
17	MF	CRO	Hrvoje Plum (from Dugopolje)
18	FW	CRO	Ante Kordić (from (Austria) Deutschlandsberger)
21	MF	CRO	Valentino Stepčić (from Zagreb)
26	FW	CRO	Ivan Miličević (from (Italy) Dro Alto Garda)
93	DF	CRO	Špiro Peričić (from Dugopolje)
95	GK	CRO	Ivan Brkić (from Lokomotiva)
97	FW	CRO	Ivan Galić (from (Albania) Flamurtari)
--	GK	CRO	Stipe Nevistić (from Hrvatski Dragovoljac)
--	DF	CRO	Zvonimir Milić (on loan from Hajduk Split)
--	FW	CRO	Frane Vojković (on loan from Hajduk Split)

Out:

No.	Pos.	Nation	Player
3	DF	CRO	Krešimir Kelez (to RNK Split)
5	DF	CRO	Jure Jerbić (to Zadar)
6	MF	CRO	Josip Tomašević (to (Slovenia) Rudar Velenje)
11	MF	CRO	Dejan Glavica (to Varaždin)
13	FW	CRO	Edi Baša (to (Bosnia and Herzegovina) Široki Brijeg)
14	DF	AUT	Toni Tipurić (to (Romania) Concordia Chiajna)
17	MF	CRO	Luka Mijoković (to (Romania) Târgu Mureș)
18	DF	CRO	Filip Žderić (to (Romania) Gaz Metan Mediaș)
19	DF	CRO	Tomislav Čuljak (to Istra 1961)
20	MF	CRO	Petar Mišić (to (Switzerland) Aarau)
24	FW	CRO	Matej Grafina (to (Austria) Deutschlandsberger)
25	FW	CRO	Ivan Mastelić (loan return to Hajduk Split)
26	DF	CRO	Danijel Romić (to (Hungary) Soroksár)
27	FW	CRO	Marko Brekalo (to Šibenik)
28	MF	CRO	Matija Misić (to (Hungary) Kisvárda)
--	MF	CRO	Florian Abramović (to Đakovo Croatia)
--	DF	BIH	Toni Markić (to (Italy) Bisceglie)

=== Dinamo Zagreb ===
In:

No.	Pos.	Nation	Player
8	DF	CZE	Jan Lecjaks (from (Switzerland) BSC Young Boys)

Out:

No.	Pos.	Nation	Player

=== Hajduk Split ===
In:

No.	Pos.	Nation	Player

Out:

No.	Pos.	Nation	Player

=== Inter Zaprešić ===
In:

No.	Pos.	Nation	Player

Out:

No.	Pos.	Nation	Player

=== Istra 1961 ===
In:

No.	Pos.	Nation	Player

Out:

No.	Pos.	Nation	Player

=== Lokomotiva ===
In:

No.	Pos.	Nation	Player

Out:

No.	Pos.	Nation	Player

=== Osijek ===
In:

No.	Pos.	Nation	Player

Out:

No.	Pos.	Nation	Player

=== Rijeka ===
In:

No.	Pos.	Nation	Player
14	MF	GHA	Boadu Maxwell Acosty (on loan from (Italy) Crotone)
19	MF	CRO	Tomislav Gomelt (from (Italy) Bari)
—	MF	CRO	Damjan Đoković (from (Italy) Spezia)

Out:

No.	Pos.	Nation	Player

=== Rudeš ===
In:

No.	Pos.	Nation	Player
1	GK	CRO	Dominik Picak (from Dugopolje)
2	MF	CRO	Tony Livančić (from (Bosnia and Herzegovina) Vitez)
5	DF	ESP	Antonio Cristian (on loan from (Spain) Alavés)
7	MF	CRO	Karlo Lulić (from (Italy) Sampdoria)
9	FW	CRO	Mario Budimir (free agent)
13	FW	CRO	Tomislav Turčin (on loan from Rijeka)
16	DF	AUT	Markus Pavic (from (Austria) Admira Wacker)
17	MF	ESP	Juanan Entrena (on loan from (Spain) Alavés)
18	FW	BIH	Robert Perić-Komšić (from Lokomotiva U19)
21	MF	CRO	Domagoj Muić (from Zagreb)
24	MF	ESP	Arturo Segado (from (Spain) Atlético Malagueño)
25	FW	CHN	Feng Boyuan (on loan from (China) Liaoning)
26	FW	COL	Rodrigo Rivas (from (Cyprus) Anagennisi Deryneia)
--	GK	CRO	Mario Gudelj (from Imotski)

Out:

No.	Pos.	Nation	Player

=== Slaven Belupo ===
In:

No.	Pos.	Nation	Player
3	DF	CRO	Mihael Rebernik (from Rijeka)
6	MF	SRB	Miloš Vidović (from RNK Split)
7	DF	CRO	Bruno Goda (from Hrvatski Dragovoljac U19)
8	FW	BIH	Benjamin Tatar (from Gorica)
9	FW	CRO	Pero Pejić (from (Albania) Kukësi)
17	MF	ALB	Bruno Telushi (from (Albania) Flamurtari)
21	DF	CRO	Ante Vrljičak (from Hajduk Split II)
23	FW	CRO	Vice Kendeš (from Hrvatski Dragovoljac)
24	MF	CRO	Kristijan Bistrović (from Slaven Belupo U19)
25	GK	CRO	Karlo Slukić (from Slaven Belupo U19)
27	MF	CRO	Dinko Trebotić (from (Norway) Fredrikstad)

Out:

No.	Pos.	Nation	Player
3	DF	CRO	Marko Martinaga (on loan to Koprivnica)
6	MF	SVN	Dalibor Stevanović (to (Switzerland) Servette)
8	MF	DEN	Søren Christensen (to (Denmark) Nykøbing)
9	FW	BRA	Héber (to Rijeka)
15	DF	KOS	Fidan Aliti (to (Albania) Skënderbeu Korçë)
17	MF	CRO	Mario Burić (to Lokomotiva)
18	DF	CRO	Gordan Barić (to Lokomotiva)
23	DF	CRO	Dario Melnjak (loan return to (Belgium) Lokeren)
27	FW	CRO	Dominik Radić (to (Slovenia) Rudar Velenje)
