= NK Inker Zaprešić =

Association football club in Croatia

Inker Zaprešić
- Full name: Nogometni klub Inker Zaprešić
- Nicknames: Keramičari (The Ceramists); Div iz predgrađa (The Giant from the Suburb)
- Short name: INK
- Founded: 25 July 2022; 4 years ago
- Ground: Stadion ŠRC Zaprešić
- Capacity: 5,228
- President: Franjo Herceg
- Head coach: Bernard Gulić
- League: Druga NL
- 2025–26: Treća NL Center, 1st of 16 (promoted)
Home colours	Away colours

Nogometni klub Inker Zaprešić is a Croatian professional football club based in Zaprešić.

== History ==
The club was founded in July 2022 as a phoenix club of NK Inter Zaprešić after it was dissolved due to bankruptcy. The name "Inker" was chosen after local ceramics factory and was former name of club's predecessor from 1991 to 2003. Prime goal of newly founded club was to keep youth academy of recently defunct Inter running, ensuring football continuity in Zaprešić. Lovro Benčević was elected as the first president. Senior squad was not formed at the time.

However, in summer of 2023. it was announced that the upcoming season of 2023-24 will be premiere season of NK Inker senior squad. Senior squad will compete in 6th tier - JŽNL (Jedinstvena županijska nogometna liga), highest tier under the Zagreb County football association authority. Tomislav Gondžić was appointed as the first head coach after one year spell as youth coach in club's academy.

== Academy ==
As NK Inter Zaprešić informal successor, the club succeeded its youth academy, which enabled retaining league status of all of the youth selections. Ernad Skulić, ex-Inter player was appointed as academy director. Youth academy currently consists of 15 selections in all age groups.

== Season-by-season record ==
Season	League									Cup	European competitions	Top scorer	
Season	Division	Pld	W	D	L	GF	GA	Pts	Pos.	Cup	European competitions	Player	Goals
2023–24	JŽNL Zagreb County (6th tier)	30	24	4	2	127	14	76	1st ↑	DNQ			
2024–25	4. NL Zagreb (5th tier)	30	22	6	2	88	18	72	1st ↑	DNQ			
2025–26	3. NL Centar - B (4th tier)	30	23	4	3	79	26	53	1st ↑	DNQ			
2026–27	Druga NL (3rd tier)												

Key

- DNQ = Did not qualify

== Managers ==
- (Croatia) Tomislav Gondžić (Jun 30, 2023 – May, 2024)
- (Croatia) Mario Poljski (May, 2024 – September, 2024)
- (Croatia) Bernard Gulić (September, 2024 – Present)
