= Igor Bišćan =

Croatian footballer and manager

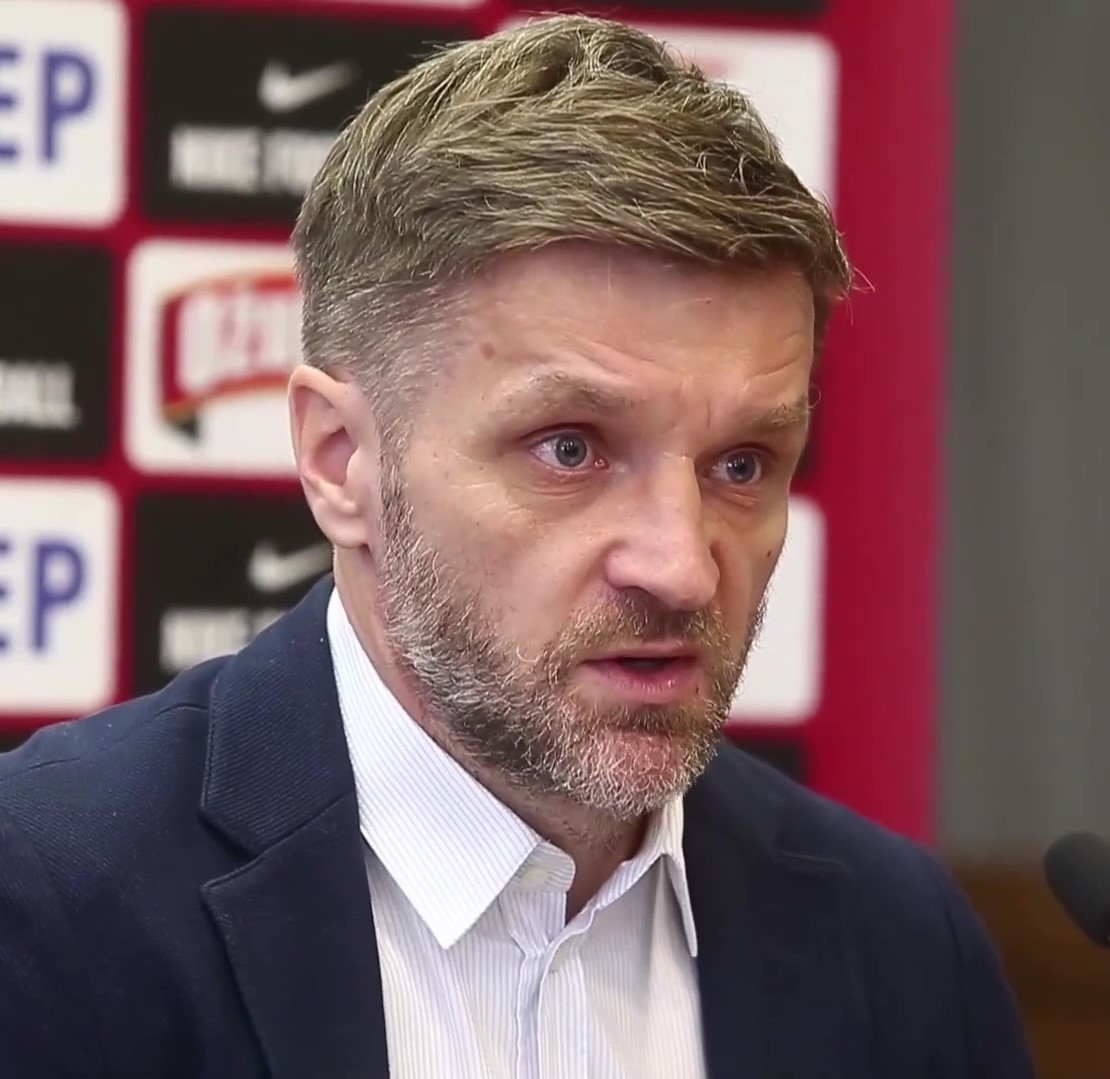
- Bišćan in 2021

Personal information
- Date of birth: 4 May 1978 (age 48)
- Place of birth: Zagreb, SR Croatia, Yugoslavia
- Height: 1.91 m (6 ft 3 in)
- Positions: Defender; midfielder

Youth career
- Dinamo Zagreb

Senior career*
Years	Team	Apps	(Gls)
1995–2000	Dinamo Zagreb	67	(11)
1995–1996	→ Samobor (loan)	12	(1)
2000–2005	Liverpool	72	(2)
2005–2007	Panathinaikos	36	(3)
2008–2012	Dinamo Zagreb	61	(1)
Total		248	(18)

International career
1998	Croatia U20	2	(1)
1997–2000	Croatia U21	15	(1)
1999	Croatia B	1	(0)
1999–2001	Croatia	15	(1)

Managerial career
- 2016–2017: Rudeš
- 2017–2018: Olimpija Ljubljana
- 2018–2019: Rijeka
- 2019–2023: Croatia U21
- 2023: Dinamo Zagreb
- 2023: Al-Shabab
- 2024–2025: Al-Ahli
- 2026–: United Arab Emirates U23
- * Club domestic league appearances and goals

Igor Bišćan (Croatian pronunciation: [îɡor bǐʃtɕan]; born 4 May 1978) is a Croatian professional football manager and former player who last coached Qatar Stars League club Al-Ahli. In his playing career, he was a versatile player and could play almost every position in defence or midfield, but featured mostly as a central midfielder, or as a central defender in his latter years.

Bišćan played for his hometown club Dinamo Zagreb, English club Liverpool, with whom he won a Champions League winners medal, Greek club Panathinaikos, and represented the Croatia national team internationally, debuting in UEFA Euro 2000 qualifying match against North Macedonia on 13 June 1999.

== Club career ==
=== Early career ===
At the start of his career, Bišćan began to amass an impressive level of playing experience, representing Croatia at youth football level and then captaining his club, Dinamo Zagreb, in the UEFA Champions League and the UEFA Cup. He was part of what is considered the most successful era of Dinamo in the Prva HNL, winning two consecutive league titles in 1999 and 2000 and participating in two consecutive group stages of Champions League (Group A, 1998–99 and Group D, 1999–2000). During his four seasons in Croatia, Bišćan scored 11 goals in 84 appearances in domestic leagues, which brought attention of foreign clubs to the promising midfielder.

=== Liverpool ===
On 8 December 2000, Bišćan contract was bought-out by Liverpool for £5.5 million at the behest of its manager, Gérard Houllier, having been sought by Juventus, Barcelona, Ajax and Milan. His debut came in a Premier League match against Ipswich Town, which Liverpool lost 1–0, with Bišćan coming off the bench to replace Christian Ziege in 71st minute. One week later, he played full 90 minutes against Manchester United at Old Trafford, with Liverpool breaking 3,240 minutes of United's undefeated run at their home ground by defeating them 1–0. He made an impressive start to his Liverpool career, briefly displacing Dietmar Hamann from the starting 11 as the defensive midfielder. He made 21 appearances by the end of the 2000–01 season, 15 of which he started and six of which he came off the substitutes' bench in. He scored his first goal for Liverpool on 14 January 2001, converting in the 18th minute of the 2000–01 League Cup match against Crystal Palace in a 5–0 victory. Unfortunately for Bišćan, he was cup–tied and therefore ineligible to play for Liverpool in their UEFA Cup-winning season.

Although Bišćan was originally signed as a central midfielder, Gérard Houllier felt he was more useful as centre back and often played Bišćan out of his natural position, sometimes even as a winger or full back. Bišćan fell out of favour after his first year at Liverpool, making only 23 appearances in the next two seasons. During this time, he made few starts and spent a total of 37 matches on the bench without being used as a substitute. A major injury crisis of the team in 2003–04 season gave Bišćan a comeback chance, and by the start of the new Premier League season, he had returned into the starting 11, featuring regularly as a centre-back in the absences of Stéphane Henchoz and Jamie Carragher. By the end of the season, Bišćan featured in 39 matches, 30 of which he played the entire 90 minutes. He was sent-off in 36th minute of Liverpool's UEFA Cup second leg match against Marseille, which turned things around for Liverpool as they were eliminated from the competition, after which he struggled to regain his place.

In the 2004–05 season, Bišćan returned to a central midfield role and played a vital part in Liverpool's run to the finals of the UEFA Champions League and was notable particularly for his marauding runs from midfield during matches against Bayer Leverkusen, Juventus and Chelsea. He was an unused substitute against Milan in the final. His last official match for the Reds was on 15 May 2005 in a Premier League clash against Aston Villa. During his last season Bišćan scored two more goals (against Fulham and Bolton Wanderers) and made a total of 35 appearances. Although Bišćan failed to live up to expectations, he is fondly remembered by Liverpool fans after his impressive final year at the club.

As a Liverpool player, he also made a cameo appearance in the film Goal!, scoring a header in the final match of the film when Liverpool were playing Newcastle United.

=== Panathinaikos ===
Following the termination of his contract with the Reds, on 15 June 2005, Bišćan signed for major Greek club Panathinaikos. During his two years in Athens, he made 36 appearances and scored 3 goals. Bišćan had a major decline in his game, disappointing both fans and the club owners. On 1 June 2007, Bišćan's contract expired and the club showed no interest in renewing his contract, making him a free agent again.

=== Return to Dinamo Zagreb ===
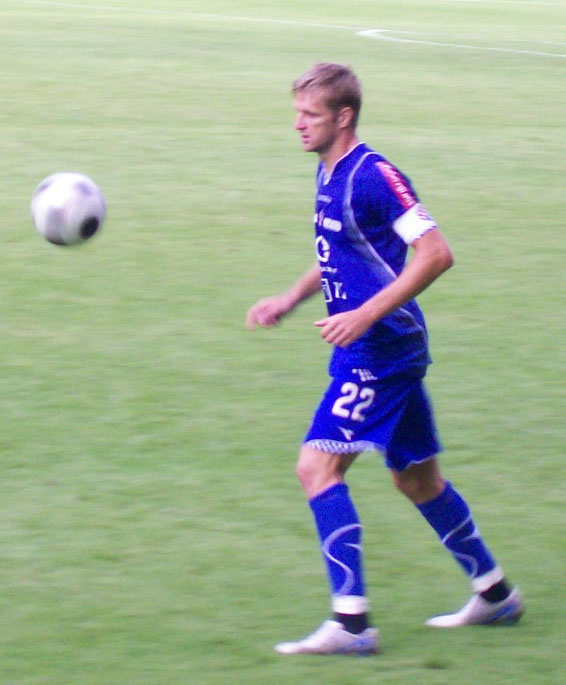
Bišćan playing for Dinamo Zagreb in 2008

Bišćan spent the next six months resting from football and mostly avoiding the high public interest shown in him. During this time, he was regularly approached by Dinamo Zagreb director Zdravko Mamić, who was interested in bringing Bišćan back to his home club. After months of negotiations, Bišćan finally signed contract on 3 December 2007. Although he was criticized for his lacking performances by the fans, Bišćan rose to become the captain of the club after the departure of Luka Modrić to Tottenham Hotspur. Following his return, Dinamo played for two consecutive seasons in UEFA Cup group stages, also winning two domestic league titles and two Croatian Cup titles.

On 19 April 2011, it was announced by unconfirmed reports that Bišćan has been scheduled for an operation on a joint that could spell the end of his career. Luckily, Bišćan opted to continue playing football and end his career at Dinamo. In April 2012, he terminated his contract with the club.

== International career ==
Bišćan's debut appearance for the Croatia national team came on a UEFA Euro 2000 qualifying match against Macedonia in Skopje on 5 June 1999. He scored his first and only international goal against Mexico on 16 June 1999. He also collected yellow cards on three occasions. Eleven out of fifteen Croatia's matches Bišćan featured in finished in a draw. His last official match was against Scotland on 1 September 2001.

After leaving the national team camp in 2003, Bišćan was suspended by Croatian Football Federation and refused to play for the national team ever since. He also represented Croatia at under-21 level and was capped in the Croatia B team on one occasion.

== Managerial career ==
Bišćan started his managerial career as an assistant coach at second-tier Druga HNL club Rudeš in 2016. Soon he was named head coach of the club, winning the 2016–17 Druga HNL title.

One month later, Bišćan signed with Slovenian PrvaLiga club Olimpija Ljubljana to be their head coach. In his inaugural season at Olimpija, he won the Slovenian PrvaLiga title and the Slovenian Cup, but in June 2018 club president, Milan Mandarić, unexpectedly sacked him.

=== Rijeka ===
On 9 October 2018, Bišćan was named head coach of first-tier Prva HNL club Rijeka.

Immediately after coming to the club, Bišćan faced criticism by the club's supporters, Armada, because of his former acts as a player of Dinamo Zagreb. He debuted at Rijeka bench in a 2–1 away win against Inter Zaprešić on 10 October. After a slew of good results, Bišćan ended the 2018–19 season in the second place in the championship, and won the Croatian Cup defeating Dinamo 3–1 in the final.

On 13 July 2019, he lost the Super Cup game 1–0 to Dinamo. In August the same year, Bišćan led the team to two victories in the third qualifying round of the UEFA Europa League over Scottish side Aberdeen. He later failed to take the club to the group stage, losing to Gent 3–2 on aggregate in the play-offs.

Bišćan resigned from his position as Rijeka head coach on 22 September 2019, after a 3–0 win against Istra 1961.

=== Croatia U21 ===
After Croatia U21 lost a Euro 2021 qualifier 2–1 against Scotland, head coach Nenad Gračan resigned on 11 September 2019 and was succeeded by Bišćan on 1 October. Bišćan made his debut in a friendly 4–1 victory over Hungary on 11 October.

On 14 October, Croatia broke the record for their biggest victory in history, beating San Marino 7–0 in Serravalle. On 18 November, Croatia compromised their qualification for the Euro 2021 after losing another qualifier, this time 2–1 against the Czech Republic. In August 2020, Bišćan tested positive for COVID-19 and was forced to lead the team to a 5–0 victory over Greece from isolation. However, after drawing 0–0 with the Czech Republic four days later, on 7 September, Croatia were forced to win all their remaining games to have a chance to qualify directly. On 8 October, Croatia once again broke the record for their biggest victory in history, beating San Marino 10–0 in Zagreb. On 12 November, Croatia failed to win their crucial qualifier against Scotland away, drawing 2–2. However, thanks to a high 7–0 win over Lithuania and Scotland losing to Greece away on 17 November, Croatia secured the second place in their qualifying group. Subsequently, they qualified for the tournament as one of five best ranked second-placed teams. Upon qualification, Bišćan received widespread national praise for his approach and utilization of the qualities of the national team, which had turned into a synonym for failure in Croatian football throughout the years.

Bišćan named his 23-man squad for the group stage of the tournament on 9 March 2021. However, during the month, several important players were ruled out, mostly due to injuries, such as Josip Brekalo, Boško Šutalo, Joško Gvardiol, Luka Sučić and Borna Sosa. After the opening match, the 1–0 loss to Portugal on 25 March, Bišćan was criticized for his catenaccio tactics that were deemed uncharacteristic for Croatian football, which is best known for its midfielders. Three days later, Bišćan led Croatia to their first ever victory at the European Under-21 Championships, beating Switzerland 3–2. However, despite losing 2–1 to England in the final group game on 31 March, Croatia qualified for the quarter-finals for the first time in their history due to a better goal difference. In the quarter-final against reigning champions Spain on 31 May, Croatia lost 2–1 after extra time.

=== Dinamo Zagreb ===
On 6 April 2023, a day after Šibenik unexpectedly eliminated Dinamo Zagreb in the semi-finals of the national cup, Dinamo parted ways with head coach Ante Čačić and appointed Bišćan as the new head coach. He was sacked on 21 August of the same year after Dinamo were eliminated by AEK Athens in the third qualifying round of the 2023–24 UEFA Champions League season.

=== Al-Shabab ===
On 18 October 2023, Bišćan was appointed as manager of Saudi Pro League club Al-Shabab. He was sacked on 27 December 2023 after a 1–0 defeat to Al-Okhdood.

=== Al-Alhli ===
On 7 June 2024, Bišćan was appointed as manager of Qatar Stars League club Al-Ahli SC (Doha). He was named coach of the month twice in a row (August and September).

== Personal life ==
In 2007, Bišćan married his wife, Marija, whom he started dating three years earlier. The couple have four daughters: Nina Marija, Bruna, Lena, and Borna.

== Career statistics ==
=== Club ===
Appearances and goals by club, season and competition
Club	Season	League			National cup		League cup		Continental		Total	
Club	Season	Division	Apps	Goals	Apps	Goals	Apps	Goals	Apps	Goals	Apps	Goals
Samobor (loan)	1997–98	Prva HNL	12	1	—		—		—		12	1
Croatia Zagreb	1997–98	Prva HNL	5	0	2	0	—		0	0	7	0
Croatia Zagreb	1998–99	Prva HNL	19	2	1	0	—		3	0	23	2
Croatia Zagreb	Total		24	2	3	0	0	0	3	0	30	2
Dinamo Zagreb	1999–00	Prva HNL	29	6	6	1	—		6	0	41	7
Dinamo Zagreb	2000–01	Prva HNL	14	3	1	0	—		6	0	21	3
Dinamo Zagreb	Total		43	9	7	1	0	0	12	0	62	10
Liverpool	2000–01	Premier League	13	0	4	0	4	1	0	0	21	1
Liverpool	2001–02	Premier League	5	0	0	0	0	0	4	0	9	0
Liverpool	2002–03	Premier League	6	0	1	0	3	0	3	0	13	0
Liverpool	2003–04	Premier League	29	0	1	0	2	0	7	0	39	0
Liverpool	2004–05	Premier League	19	2	1	0	6	0	9	0	35	2
Liverpool	Total		72	2	7	0	15	1	23	0	117	3
Panathinaikos	2005–06	Alpha Ethniki	20	3	—		—		6	0	26	3
Panathinaikos	2006–07	Super League Greece	16	0	5	0	—		5	0	26	0
Panathinaikos	Total		36	3	5	0	0	0	11	0	52	3
Dinamo Zagreb	2007–08	Prva HNL	9	0	5	1	—		0	0	14	1
Dinamo Zagreb	2008–09	Prva HNL	27	1	6	1	—		12	2	45	4
Dinamo Zagreb	2009–10	Prva HNL	8	0	0	0	—		6	1	14	1
Dinamo Zagreb	2010–11	Prva HNL	14	0	4	1	—		10	1	28	2
Dinamo Zagreb	2011–12	Prva HNL	3	0	0	0	—		0	0	3	0
Dinamo Zagreb	Total		61	1	15	3	0	0	28	4	104	8
Career total			248	19	37	4	15	1	77	4	377	28

=== International ===
Appearances and goals by national team and year
National team	Year	Apps	Goals
Croatia	1999	7	1
Croatia	2000	4	0
Croatia	2001	4	0
Total		15	1

Scores and results list Croatia's goal tally first, score column indicates score after each Bišćan goal.

List of international goals scored by Igor Bišćan
No.	Date	Venue	Cap	Opponent	Score	Result	Competition
1	16 June 1999	Seoul World Cup Stadium, Seoul, South Korea	3	Mexico	2–1	2–1	Friendly

== Managerial statistics ==
As of match played 22 December 2023

Managerial record by team and tenure
Team	From	To	Record				
Team	From	To	P	W	D	L	Win %
Rudeš	7 June 2016	2 June 2017	36	19	9	8	52.78
Olimpija Ljubljana	2 June 2017	6 June 2018	44	28	12	4	63.64
Rijeka	9 October 2018	23 September 2019	43	26	9	8	60.47
Croatia U21 (Note: Competitive matches only; friendly games are not included.)	1 October 2019	6 April 2023	25	15	3	7	60.00
Dinamo Zagreb	6 April 2023	21 August 2023	17	10	5	2	58.82
Al-Shabab	18 October 2023	27 December 2023	11	3	3	5	27.27
Total			176	101	41	34	57.39

== Honours ==
=== Player ===
Samobor

- Croatian Second League: 1995–96 (West)

Dinamo Zagreb

- Croatian First League: 1997–98, 1998–99, 1999–2000, 2007–08, 2008–09, 2008–09, 2010–11, 2011–12
- Croatian Cup: 1997–98, 2007–08, 2008–09, 2010–11
- Croatian Super Cup: 2010

Liverpool

- Football League Cup: 2000–01, 2002–03; runner-up 2004–05
- FA Charity Shield: 2001
- UEFA Champions League: 2004–05
- UEFA Super Cup: 2001

=== Manager ===
Rudeš

- Croatian Second League: 2016–17

Olimpija Ljubljana

- Slovenian PrvaLiga: 2017–18
- Slovenian Cup: 2017–18

Rijeka

- Croatian Cup: 2018–19

Dinamo Zagreb

- Croatian Football League: 2022–23
- Croatian Super Cup: 2023
