= Benjamin Demir =

Macedonian footballer

Personal information
- Date of birth: 16 May 1996 (age 30)
- Place of birth: Skopje, Macedonia
- Height: 1.81 m (5 ft 11 in)
- Position: Winger

Team information
- Current team: Vardar
- Number: 10

Youth career
- 2012–2013: Vardar

Senior career*
Years	Team	Apps	(Gls)
2013–2014	Vardar	0	(0)
2013	→ Teteks (loan)	0	(0)
2014	Inter Zaprešić	9	(0)
2015	Gorno Lisiče	0	(0)
2015	Hajduk Split II		
2015–2016	Teteks		
2016	Pelister	3	(0)
2017	Rabotnichki	10	(1)
2017–2018	Skopje	27	(2)
2018	Spartak Subotica	1	(0)
2019	Makedonija	29	(3)
2020	Shkupi	2	(0)
2020–2021	Makedonija	11	(0)
2021	Belasica	13	(2)
2021	Skopje	11	(1)
2022-	Vardar	14	(4)

International career
2012	Macedonia U17	2	(0)
2014	Macedonia U19	3	(0)
- * Club domestic league appearances and goals as of 2 September 2023

Benjamin Demir (Macedonian: Бенјамин Демир, born 16 May 1996) is a Macedonian footballer who plays as a winger for FK Vardar.

== Club career ==
Born in Skopje, he started playing in the youth section of local powerhouse FK Vardar. He had a loan spell at FK Pelister, but his senior debut happened after signing with Croatian side NK Inter Zaprešić where he played the first half of the 2014–15 Druga HNL. During winter-break he returned to Macedonia and joined FK Gorno Lisiče, however, in February he returned to Croatia and signed with powerhouse HNK Hajduk Split playing the rest of the season with their reserves team. In summer 2015 he returned to Macedonia and joined FK Teteks debuting with them in the 2015–16 Macedonian First Football League. During summer 2017 he signed with FK Pelister, however, soon after he left the club without debuting for them. He joined FK Rabotnichki during winter-breal of 2016–17. In summer 2017 he moved to FK Skopje where he played the entire 2017–18 Macedonian First Football League. In summer 2018 he moved abroad again, this time to Serbia, and joined FK Spartak Subotica where he played the first half of the 2018–19 Serbian SuperLiga. During winter-break he returned to Macedonia and signed with FK Makedonija Gjorče Petrov.

== International career ==
Benjamin Demir represented Macedonia at U17 level in 2012, and in U19 level in 2014. He also received calls for Macedonian U21 side in 2018 but failed to debut.

== Personal life ==
He is the son of former footballer Erol Demir. He has daughter Dora. His wife is Teamina Demir.
