= Gordan Barić =

Croatian footballer

Personal information
- Date of birth: 11 August 1994 (age 32)
- Place of birth: Leninsk-Kuznetsky, Kemerovo Oblast, Russia
- Height: 1.73 m (5 ft 8 in)
- Positions: Right back; right wing

Team information
- Current team: Inker Zaprešić
- Number: 18

Youth career
- 2003–2012: Inter Zaprešić

Senior career*
Years	Team	Apps	(Gls)
2013–2015	Bistra	71	(1)
2015–2017	Slaven Belupo	37	(3)
2017–2018	Lokomotiva	25	(0)
2018–2019	Rudeš	19	(0)
2019–2021	Inter Zaprešić	36	(0)
2021–2023	Rudeš	14	(0)
2023–	Inker Zaprešić	2	(0)
- * Club domestic league appearances and goals as of 31 August 2023

Gordan Barić (born 11 August 1994) is a Croatian footballer who plays for Inker Zaprešić as a defender.
