= Ivan Laljak-Ivić Stadium =

Association football stadium in Zaprešić, Croatia

- Stadion Ivan Laljak-Ivić
- Inker
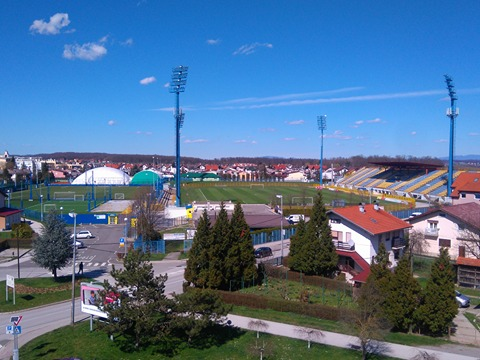
- Stadium as it was in March 2018
- Interactive map of Ivan Laljak-Ivić Stadium
- Location: Zaprešić, Croatia
- Coordinates: 45°51′53″N 15°47′59″E
- Owner: City of Zaprešić
- Capacity: 5,228
- Surface: Hybrid grass
- Record attendance: approx. 12,000 (Jugokeramika vs. BSK Slavonski Brod)
- Field size: 105 x 68 metres (114.8 x 74.3 yards)

Construction
- Built: 1962 (basic football pitch); 1987 (underwent major upgrades)

Tenants
- Inter Zaprešić (1962–2022); Inker Zaprešić (2022–present); Dinamo Zagreb II (2026–present)

Ivan Laljak-Ivić Stadium (Croatian: Stadion Ivan Laljak-Ivić) is a football stadium inside the sports complex ŠRC Zaprešić in Zaprešić, Croatia. The primary user of this stadium is a football club NK Inker Zaprešić. The stadium has a capacity of 5,228.

== History ==
The stadium was being built gradually. The first football pitch on the stadium's current location was opened back in 1962. In 1987, the larger eastern stand was built in order to fulfill the needs of Summer Universiade held that same year. In 2005, after NK Inter Zaprešić finished runners-up in Croatian First Football league, the stadium received the new floodlights. In 2016 the city of Zaprešić decided to rebuild the adjacent training grounds inside the complex. For this purpose the brand new artificial turf pitch was built, while smaller, already existing artificial turf pitch was renovated. In May 2018, reconstruction of main football pitch started. This includes: implementation of new ground drainage, ground heating system and installation of new hybrid grass. On December 14, 2019 an assembly of Inter Zaprešić was held to commemorate 90 years of the club. The assembly decided to rename ŠRC Zaprešić to Ivan Laljak-Ivić stadium in honour of their late president. Under the guidance of Laljak-Ivić Inter entered the First League of Croatia and achieved their greatest success, winning the Croatian cup.

== Other assets inside the complex ==
Except for football purposed facilities, inside the complex there is: a multi-functional hall used by various local sport clubs, University of Applied Sciences Zaprešić, along with its accompanying facilities such as the library and student cafeteria, several cafe shops, civic associations and a Novi Dvori restaurant.

== Gallery ==
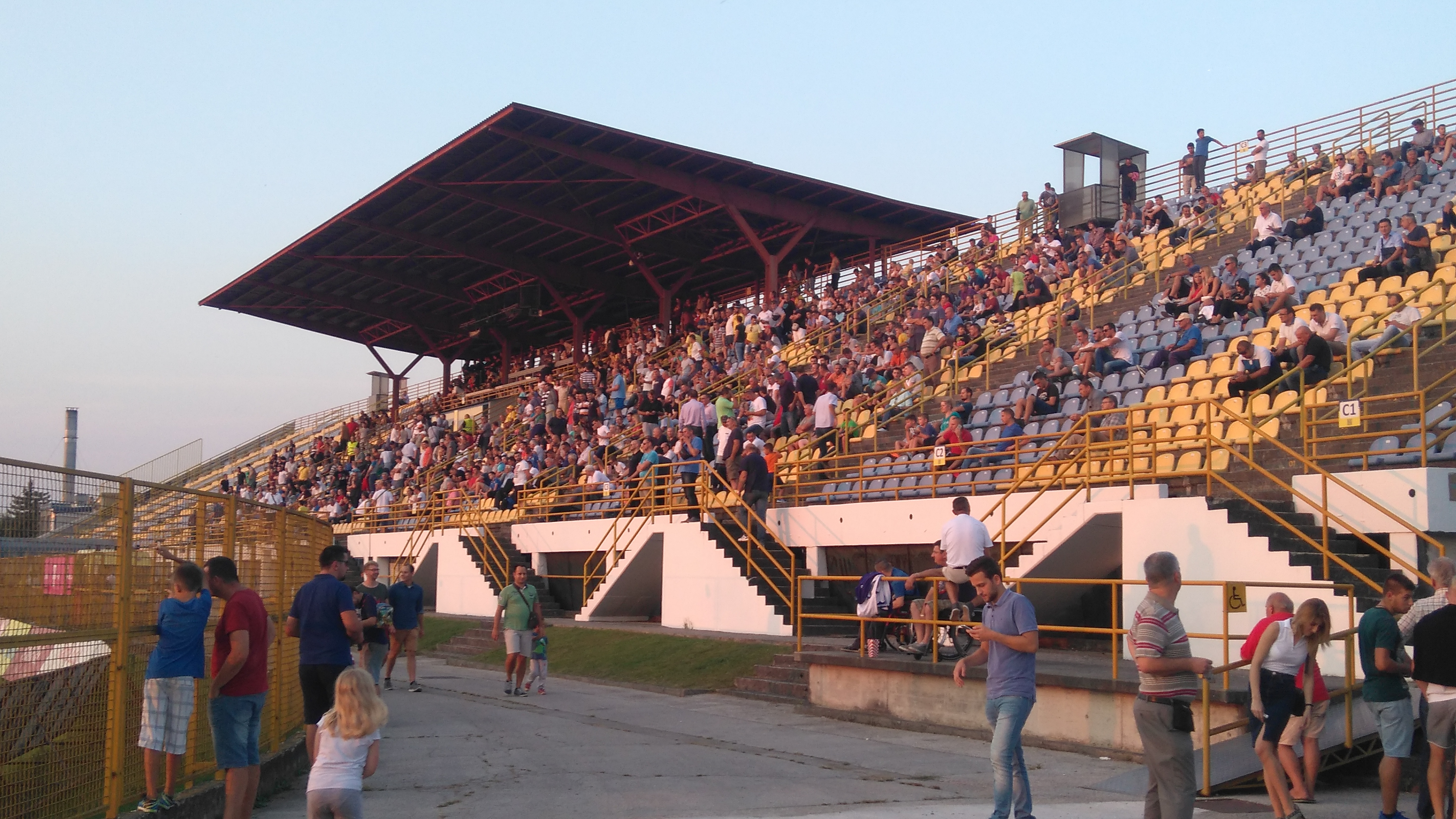
Eastern stand during a football match.

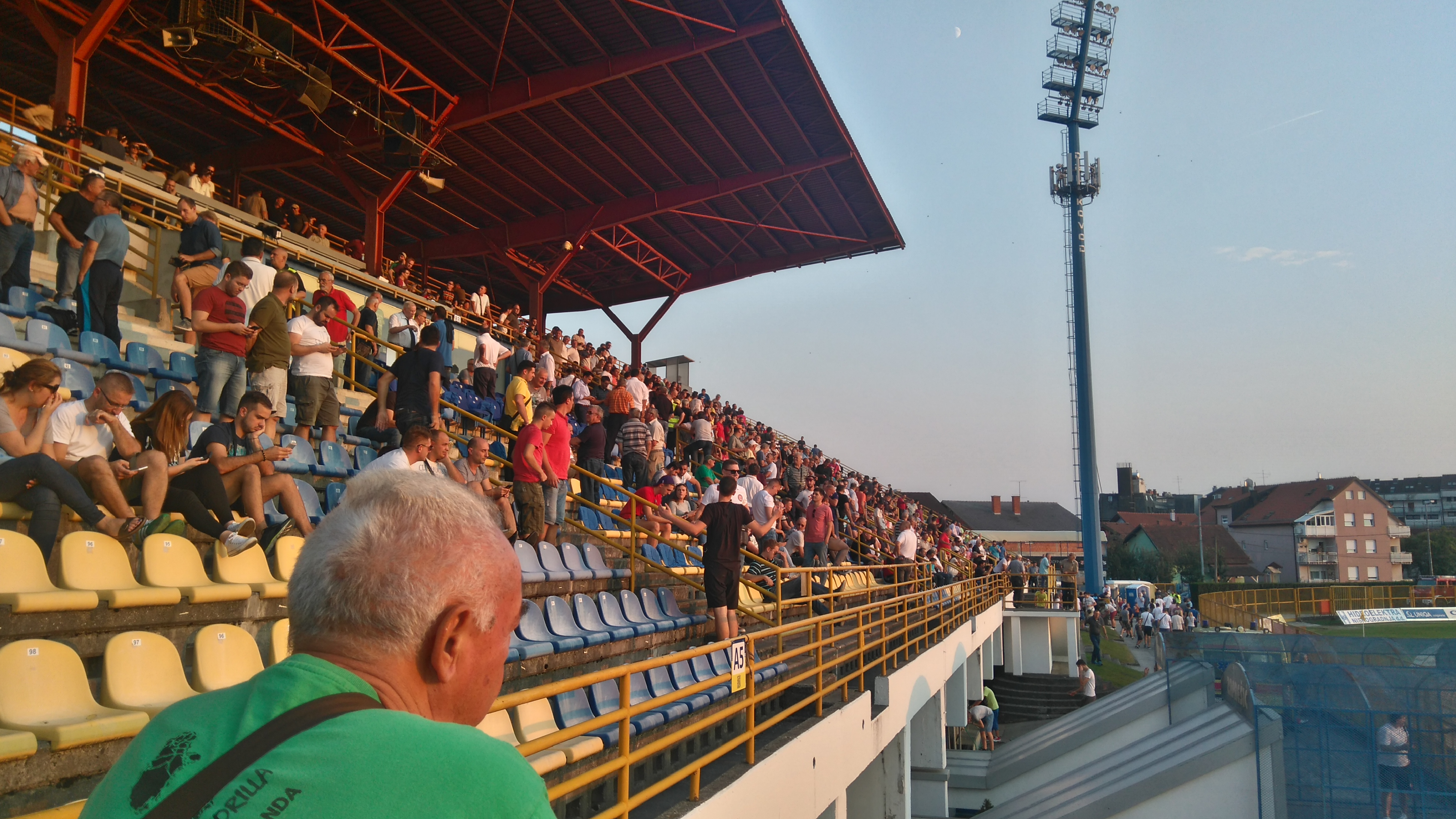
View from the stairs towards the eastern stand.

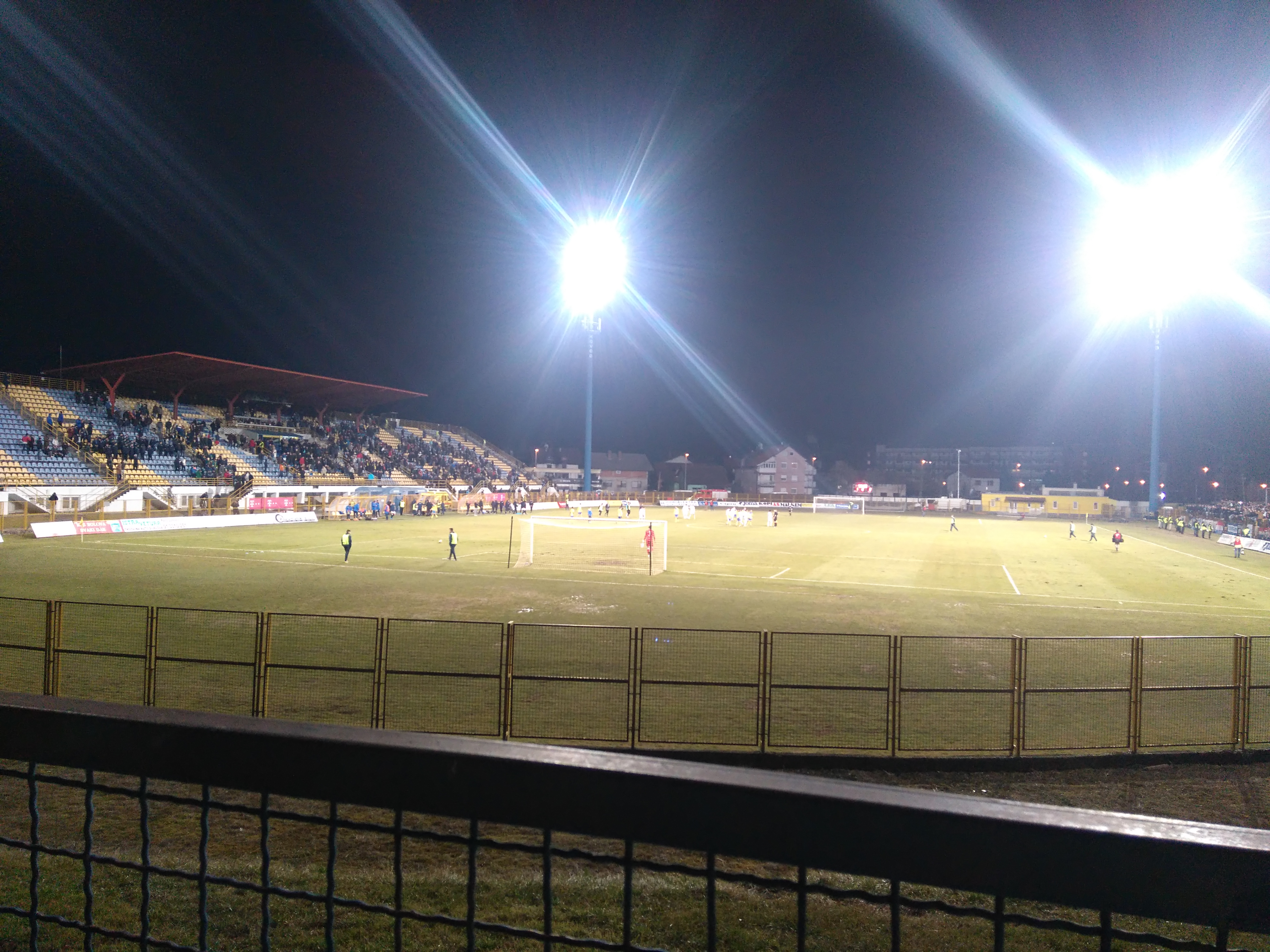
Stadium during the night game.

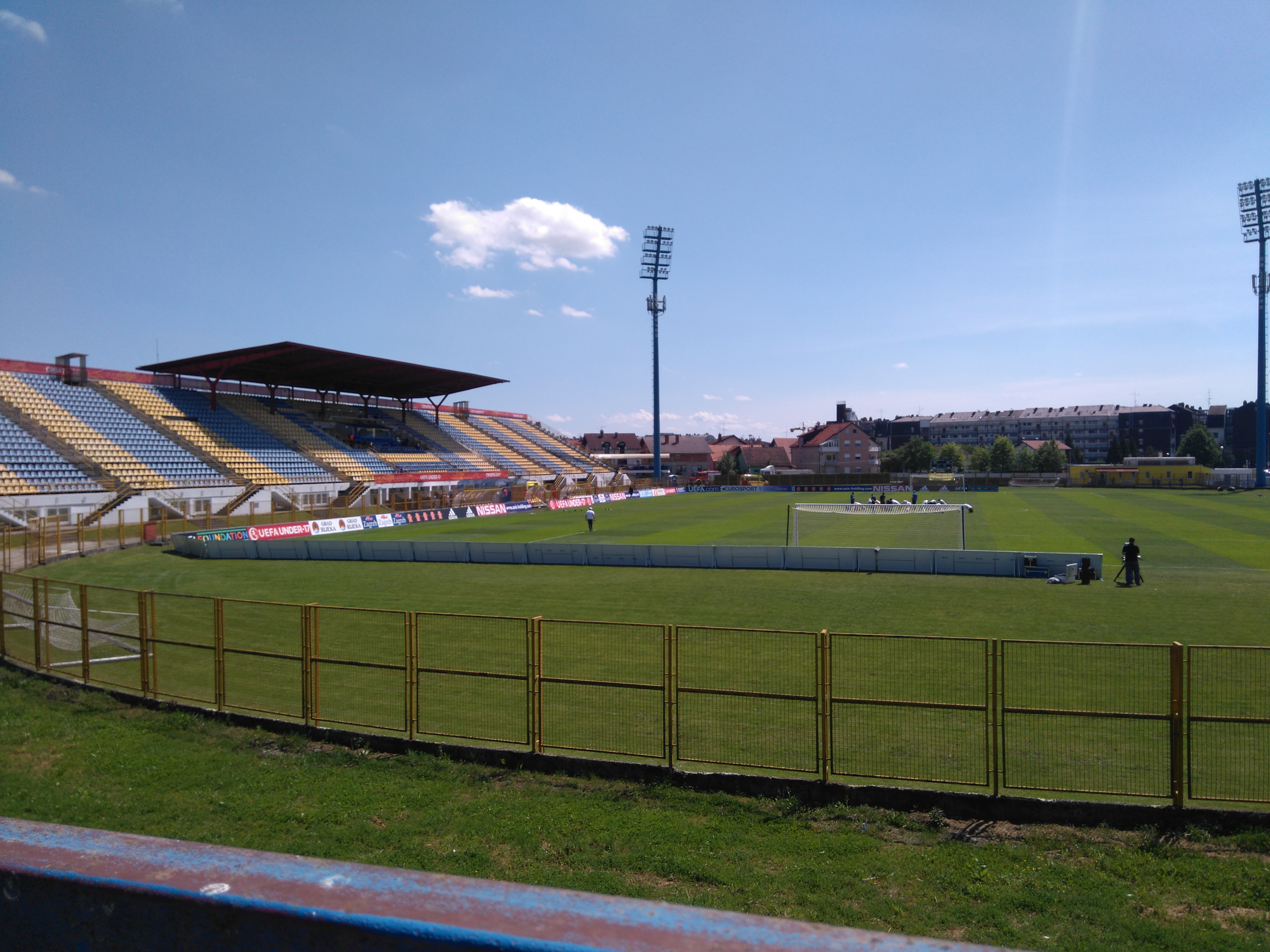
Stadium after the 2017 UEFA European Under-17 Championship match between France and Faroe Islands.

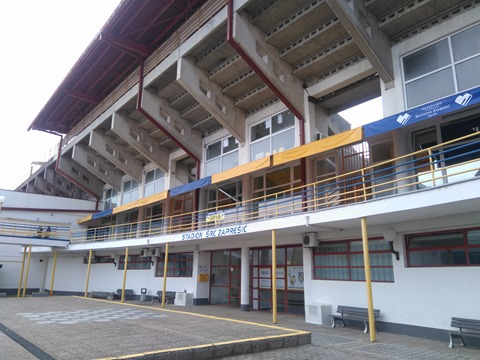
Eastern entrance to the stand and Baltazar university.

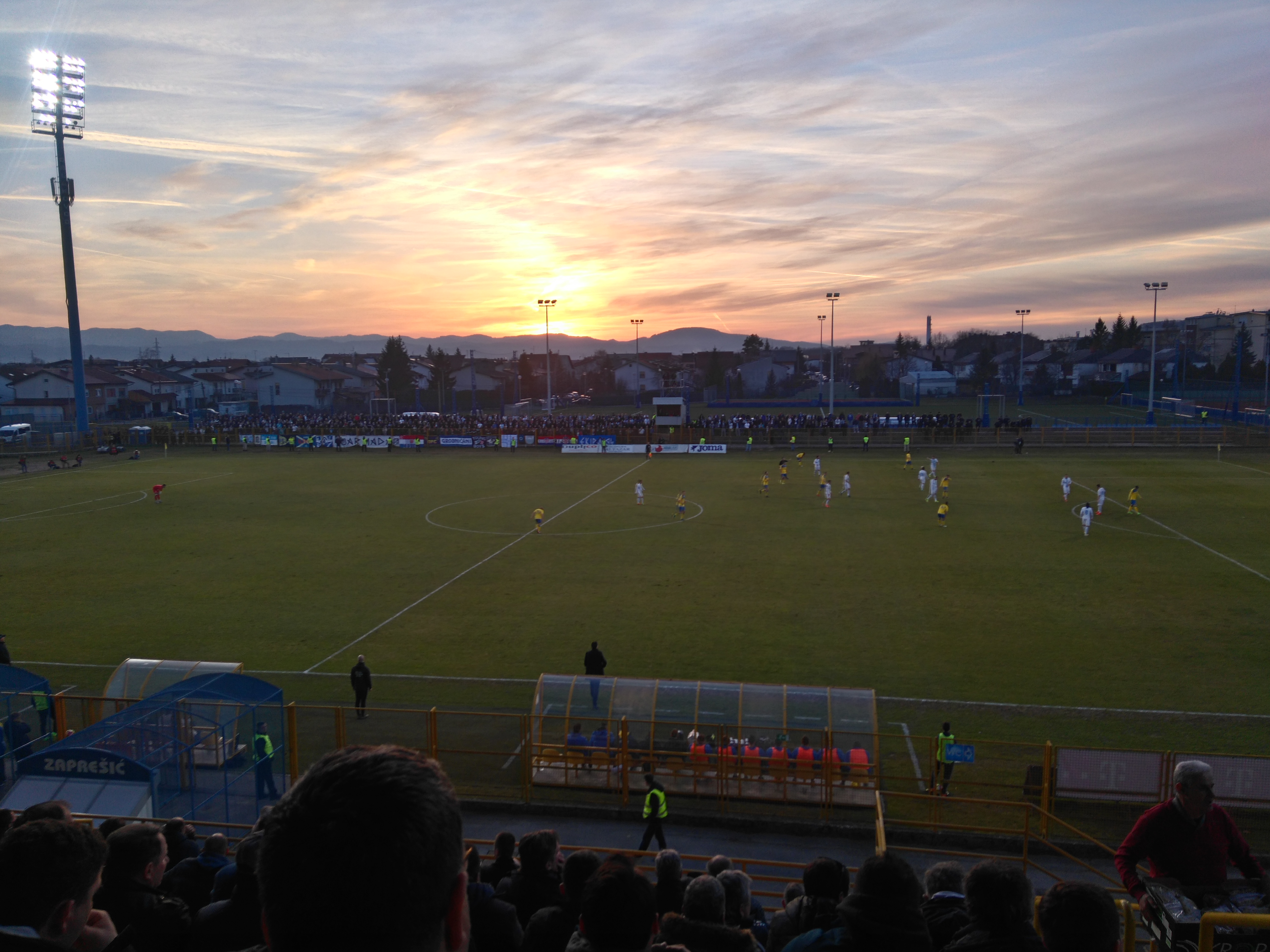
Guest fans on smaller western stand.

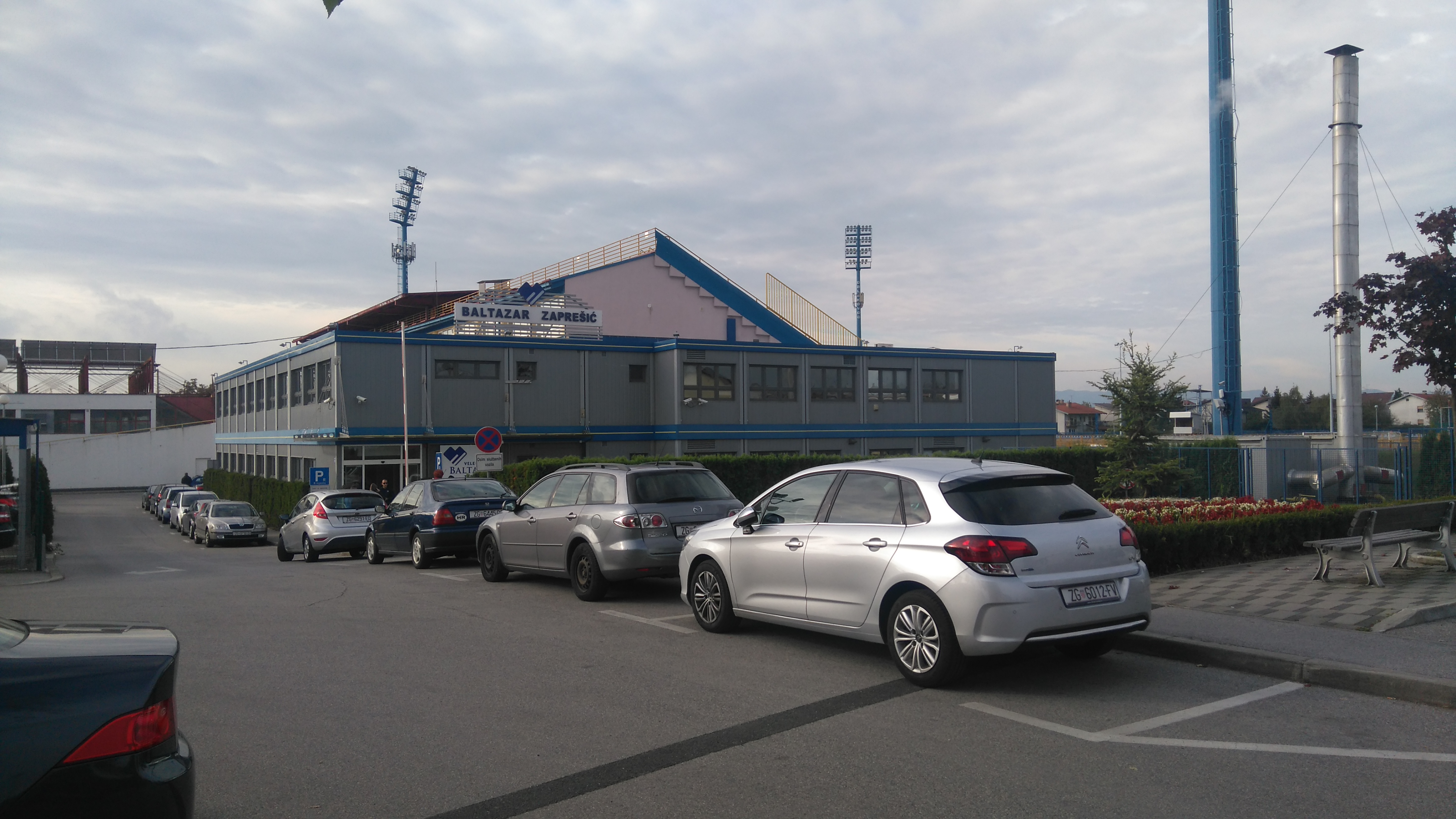
University of Applied Sciences Zaprešić, located on the stadium.
