= NK Kreševo-Stanić =

Association football club

- Full name: Nogometni Klub Kreševo-Stanić
- Founded: 1956; 69 years ago
- Ground: Stamal Arena
Home colours	Away colours

NK Kreševo-Stanić is a Bosnian football team based in the Central Bosnian town of Kreševo. The home ground is the Stamal Arena in Kreševo.

== History ==
Soccer began in Kreševo in the summer of 1956 when students would return from school and play against the nearby towns of Kiseljak and Fojnica. In 1966 the Mayor of the town of Branko Tavra designated some land for the formation of an official football club and a stadium was built with the help of the players.

In 1969, Kreševo played its first match against Mladosti from Sarajevo and emerged victorious 5–4. Shortly after when the potential was evident in this small town, it registered to compete in the Sarajevo district.

After playing for some time in the Second Division North in Bosnia and Herzegovina, NK Kreševo were promoted at the expense of their neighbouring town NK Kiseljak.

2004/05 was NK Kreševo's 1st season in the First League of the Federation of Bosnia and Herzegovina where they finished in a respectable 4th place. In 2005/2006 season the club struggled somewhat and narrowly avoided relegation by finishing 13, with all teams below them being relegated.

However, in 2006/2007, headed by Spomenko Bošnjak (who had a bright career in the premier leagues of both Croatia and Bosnia and Herzegovina) in a Player/Coach role, the club was leading the 1st division after 4 rounds and was pushing for promotion into the Premier League of Bosnia and Herzegovina.
