= Ivan Rajčić =

Croatian footballer

Personal information
- Full name: Ivan Rajčić
- Date of birth: 16 April 1981 (age 45)
- Place of birth: Split, SR Croatia, SFR Yugoslavia
- Height: 1.85 m (6 ft 1 in)
- Position: Midfielder

Senior career*
Years	Team	Apps	(Gls)
1998–2000	Verona	0	(0)
2001–2005	Chieti	46	(4)
2005	→ Bari (loan)	10	(0)
2005–2011	Bari	78	(1)
2009	→ Frosinone (loan)	11	(0)
2010	→ Taranto (loan)	12	(0)
2010–2011	→ Barletta (loan)	26	(0)
2011–2013	Benevento	56	(1)
2014–2016	Casertana	34	(1)
2016	Martina	15	(0)
2016–2018	Casertana	60	(4)

International career
1998	Croatia U-17	3	(0)
2001	Croatia U-20	1	(0)
- * Club domestic league appearances and goals as of 15 May 2018

Ivan Rajčić (born 16 April 1981) is a Croatian retired footballer.

== Career ==
On 13 July 2011 Rajčić was signed by Benevento in a 2-year deal.

In 2013 Rajčić was suspended for 3 1/2 years for his involvement in a match-fixing scandal. It was reduced by Tribunale Nazionale di Arbitrato per lo Sport to 13 months in April 2014.

In 2014, he was signed by Casertana. On 26 January 2016 Rajčić was signed by Martina in a 1 1/2-year deal.
