= Mladen Posavec =

Croatian footballer and manager

Personal information
- Date of birth: 22 August 1971 (age 55)
- Place of birth: Koprivnica, Croatia
- Height: 1.77 m (5 ft 9 1/2 in)
- Position: Midfielder

Team information
- Current team: Al Batin FC (asst. manager)

Senior career*
Years	Team	Apps	(Gls)
1992–2000	Varteks	169	(12)
2000–2002	SW Bregenz	32	(3)
2003	Blau-Weiß Feldkirch	12	(0)
2003–2004	SV Lochau		
2005	Viktoria Bregenz	2	(0)
2005–2006	SV Lochau	10	(0)
2007	SW Bregenz		

Managerial career
- 2008–2010: SW Bregenz II
- 2010–2013: SW Bregenz
- 2014: Viktoria Bregenz
- 2014–2015: Austria Lustenau II
- 2014–2015: Austria Lustenau
- 2015–2016: Al-Taawoun (Academy dir.)
- 2019: Al Ain (assistant)
- 2021: Saham
- 2021: Suwaiq
- 2021-: Al Batin (assistant)
- * Club domestic league appearances and goals

Mladen Posavec (born 22 August 1971) is a Croatian football manager and former midfielder, who works as an assistant to Al Batin FC manager Alen Horvat.

== Playing career ==
Posavec has had spells at several Austrian clubs.
