= Gražvydas Mikulėnas =

Lithuanian footballer

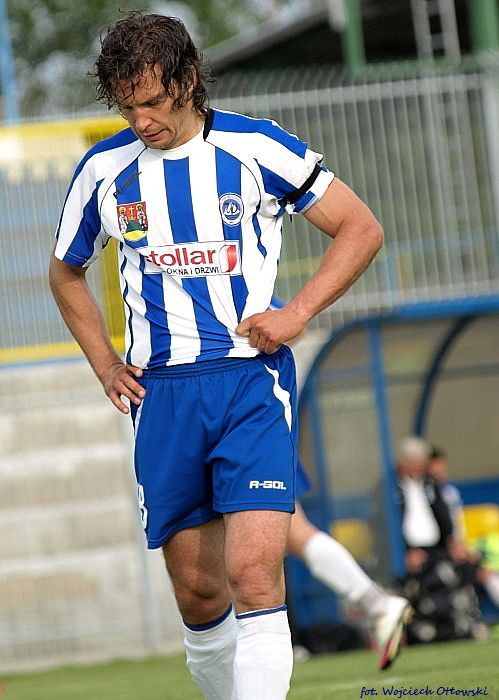

Personal information
- Full name: Gražvydas Mikulėnas
- Date of birth: 16 December 1973 (age 52)
- Place of birth: Vilnius, Lithuania
- Height: 1.90 m (6 ft 3 in)
- Position: Striker

Senior career*
Years	Team	Apps	(Gls)
1990–1996	Žalgiris	79	(31)
1996–1999	Polonia Warsaw	62	(22)
1999–2000	Dinamo Zagreb	15	(4)
2000	Polonia Warsaw	7	(2)
2000–2001	GKS Katowice	20	(3)
2002–2004	Akratitos	8	(0)
2004	Wisła Płock	25	(4)
2004–2005	Ventspils	26	(3)
2005	Radomiak Radom	17	(5)
2006	Zawisza Bydgoszcz 2	17	(4)
2006	Ruch Chorzów	48	(21)
2006–2008	GKS Katowice	55	(12)
2009–2012	Wigry Suwałki	68	(35)
2012–2013	Taip Vilnius		
2013	Gariūnai Vilnius		
2014	Bekentas Vilnius		

International career
1997–2003	Lithuania	12	(1)
- * Club domestic league appearances and goals

Gražvydas Mikulėnas (born 16 December 1973 in Vilnius) is a Lithuanian former professional footballer who played as a striker.

== International career ==
Mikulėnas made 12 appearances for the Lithuania national team between 1997 and 2003. His debut took place in the match against Poland in Olsztyn on 24 September 1997 (a 0–2 loss).

== Honours ==
Žalgiris

- LFF Lyga: 1991, 1991–92
- Lithuanian Cup: 1991, 1992–93, 1993–94

Dinamo Zagreb

- Prva HNL: 1998–99

Polonia Warsaw

- Ekstraklasa: 1999–2000
- Polish League Cup: 1999–2000

Ventspils

- Latvian Cup: 2004

Ruch Chorzów

- II liga: 2006–07

Individual

- II liga East top scorer: 2010–11
- Polish Cup top scorer: 2010–11
