= Bernard Gulić =

Croatian footballer

Personal information
- Date of birth: 9 April 1980 (age 46)
- Place of birth: Zagreb, SFR Yugoslavia
- Height: 1.88 m (6 ft 2 in)
- Position: Defender

Youth career
- –1997: Inter Zaprešić
- 1997–1998: Hrvatski Zagreb

Senior career*
Years	Team	Apps	(Gls)
1998–2003	Hrvatski Dragovoljac	83+	(3+)
2004–2012	Inter Zaprešić	159+	(18+)
2012–2014	Bistra		
- * Club domestic league appearances and goals

Bernard Gulić (born 9 April 1980) is a Croatian retired football defender.
