= Erol Demir =

Macedonian football player

Personal information
- Full name: Erol Demir
- Date of birth: 18 September 1970 (age 56)
- Place of birth: SFR Yugoslavia
- Positions: Defender; midfielder

Senior career*
Years	Team	Apps	(Gls)
1988–1991	Vardar	24	(2)
1997–1998	Železnik		
1999–2000	Vardar		
2000–2001	Čakovec	4	(1)

International career
1990	Yugoslavia U21	1	(0)
- * Club domestic league appearances and goals

Erol Demir (Macedonian: Ерол Демир; born 18 September 1970) is a former Macedonian footballer.

== Club career ==
Demir made his debut with one appearance for FK Vardar in the 1988–89 Yugoslav First League. He played with Vardar in the Yugoslav league system until 1991.

During the 1990s besides Vardar he also played with Serbian side FK Železnik in the 1997–98 First League of FR Yugoslavia.

Later, he also played in Croatia with NK Čakovec in the 2000–01 Prva HNL.

== International career ==
At national team level, Demir made an appearance for Yugoslavia U21 in 1990.

== Personal life ==
His son, Benjamin Demir, is also a footballer.
