= Spomenko Bošnjak =

Bosnian-Herzegovinian footballer

Personal information
- Full name: Spomenko Bošnjak
- Date of birth: 18 July 1973 (age 53)
- Place of birth: SFR Yugoslavia
- Height: 1.80 m (5 ft 11 in)
- Position: Defender

Senior career*
Years	Team	Apps	(Gls)
1996–2001	Hrvatski Dragovoljac	131	(10)
2002	Dinamo Zagreb	21	(2)
2003–2005	Metalurh Zaporizhzhia	49	(5)
2006	Široki Brijeg	13	(0)
2006–2007	Kreševo-Stanić		

International career
2002	Bosnia and Herzegovina	2	(0)
- * Club domestic league appearances and goals

Spomenko Bošnjak (born 18 July 1973) is a former Bosnian-Herzegovinian footballer.

== Club career ==
An ethnic Croat, he started his career at NK Hrvatski dragovoljac at Prva HNL. He then played for NK Dinamo Zagreb and Ukrainian side FC Metalurh Zaporizhya. At age of 33, he returned to Bosnia and Herzegovina and played for NK Široki Brijeg and NK Kreševo-Stanić.

== International career ==
Bošnjak was capped twice for Bosnia and Herzegovina, he made his debut on 11 October 2002 against Germany, a friendly. On 16 October he played his last match against Norway for European Championship qualification.
