= Dalibor Božac =

Croatian footballer (born 1976)

Personal information
- Full name: Dalibor Božac
- Date of birth: 3 June 1976 (age 50)
- Place of birth: Pula, Croatia
- Height: 1.89 m (6 ft 2 in)
- Position: Defender

Senior career*
Years	Team	Apps	(Gls)
1995–2000	Istra		
2000–2001	Hajduk Split	9	(1)
2002	Pomorac	12	(1)
2002–2004	Slaven Belupo	48	(2)
2004	Istra 1961	13	(0)
2004	Međimurje	9	(0)
2005–2008	Slaven Belupo	44	(1)
2008–2009	Istra 1961	24	(1)

International career
1996	U19	3	
- * Club domestic league appearances and goals as of 13 May 2010

Dalibor Božac (born 3 June 1976) is a Croatian retired football defender.
