= Mihael Mikić =

Croatian footballer and manager

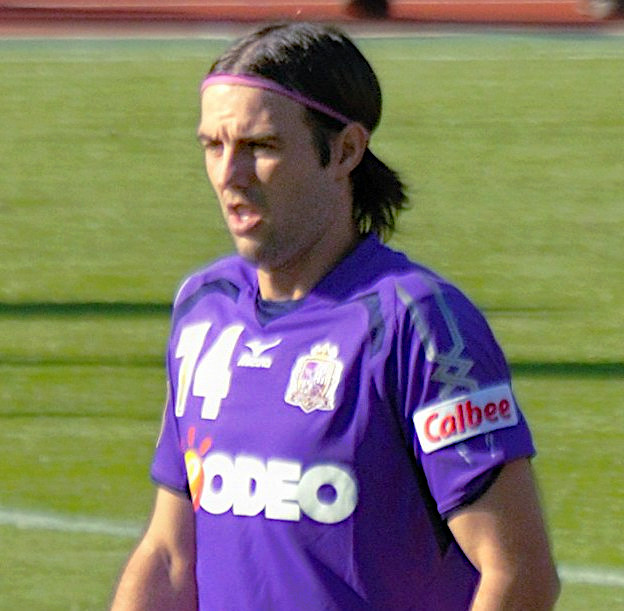
- Mikić with Sanfrecce Hiroshima in 2010

Personal information
- Full name: Mihael Mikić
- Date of birth: 6 January 1980 (age 46)
- Place of birth: Zagreb, SR Croatia, SFR Yugoslavia
- Height: 1.77 m (5 ft 10 in)
- Position: Right midfielder

Youth career
- 1987–1993: Bistra
- 1993–1996: Inker Zaprešić

Senior career*
Years	Team	Apps	(Gls)
1996–1997	Inker Zaprešić	25	(5)
1997–2004	Dinamo Zagreb	144	(24)
2004–2006	1. FC Kaiserslautern	26	(0)
2006	Rijeka	14	(0)
2007–2008	Dinamo Zagreb	46	(4)
2009–2017	Sanfrecce Hiroshima	223	(8)
2018	Shonan Bellmare	6	(0)
Total		484	(41)

International career
1997–1999	Croatia U19	12	(5)
1999–2001	Croatia U21	19	(6)

Managerial career
- 2019–2021: Croatia U21 (assistant)
- 2021: Dinamo Zagreb (assistant)
- 2021–2022: Dinamo Zagreb II (assistant)
- 2022–2023: Maribor (assistant)
- 2023–2024: Celje (assistant)
- * Club domestic league appearances and goals

Mihael Mikić (Croatian pronunciation: [mǐxael mǐːkitɕ]; born 6 January 1980) is a Croatian former professional footballer who played as a right midfielder.

He most commonly played as a right winger or right-back, but was known as a quite effective forward in the beginnings of his career.

== Club career ==
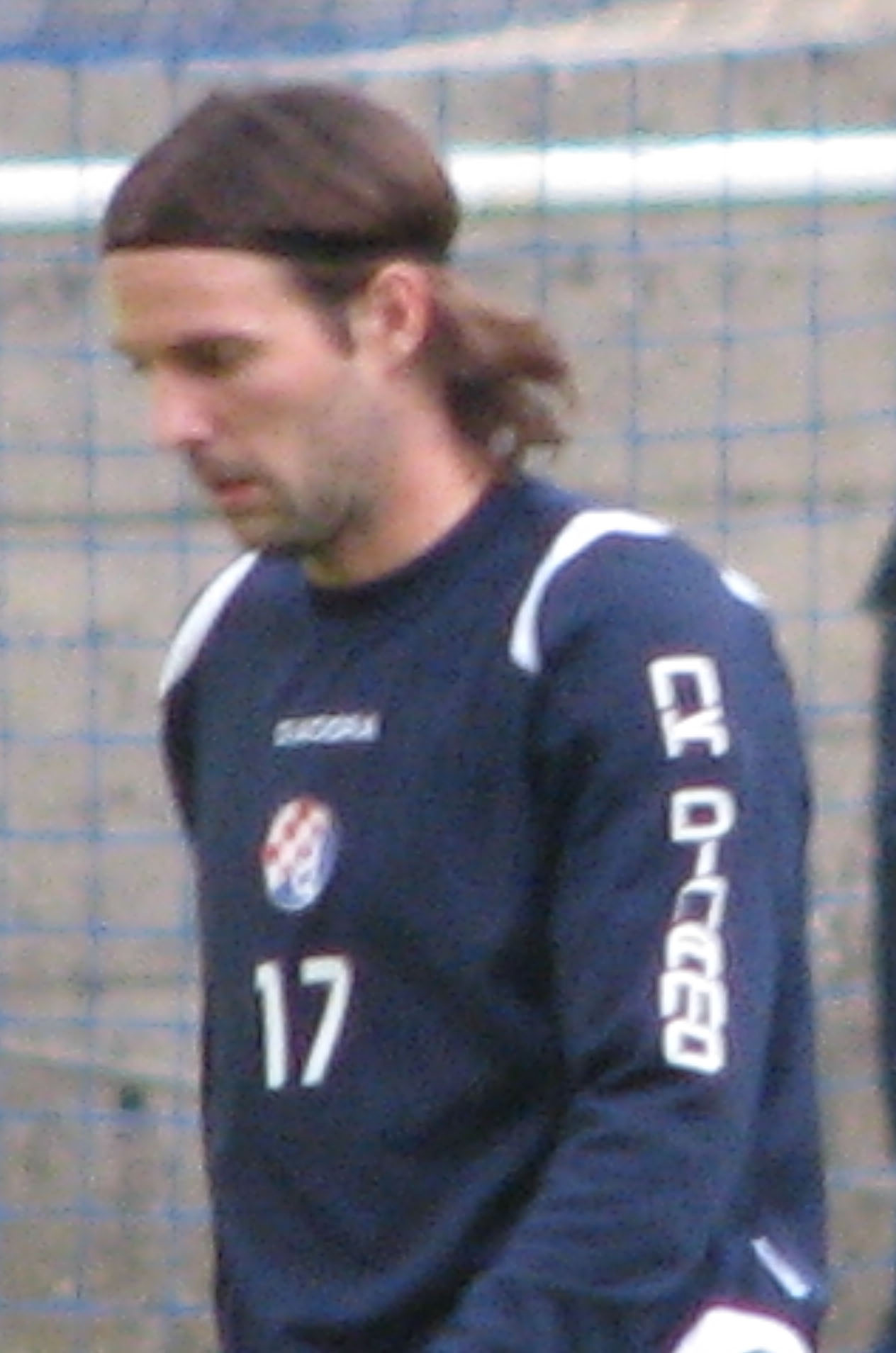
Mikić playing for Dinamo Zagreb

Mikić was born in Zagreb and started to play football at Bistra when he was seven years old. At the age of 13, he moved to Inker Zaprešić and started his professional career at the club already at the age of 16. He left Inker after his first professional season and went on to sign with Dinamo Zagreb, where he became a regular by the time he turned 19.

He was still only 18 years old when he went on to make three appearances for Dinamo Zagreb in the UEFA Champions League group stage in the autumn of 1998, starting in two matches and becoming notable for scoring the club's first goal in the UEFA Champions League when he opened the scoring in the 7th minute of Dinamo's fourth group match, against Porto at home in Zagreb. Dinamo won the match 3–1 and went on to win 1–0 against Ajax Amsterdam away and draw 1–1 against Olympiacos at home, but failed to advance to the quarterfinals after finishing second in their group. Mikić appeared in all of Dinamo's three home matches, playing as a striker.

He also played with Dinamo Zagreb in the UEFA Champions League in the following year and made five appearances in six group matches, but was a starting player only once. He scored one goal in Dinamo's final group match, away against Olympique de Marseille, that ended in a 2–2 draw. Dinamo was eliminated from the competition after finishing last out of four teams in their group.

Mikić continued to play for Dinamo Zagreb until 2004 and then he left the club after seven seasons for German Bundesliga side 1. FC Kaiserslautern. In his first season in Germany, he made only six Bundesliga appearances for Kaiserslautern and was not a regular in the first part of the 2005–06 season either, making only four appearances in the league, but then he became a regular after the winter break and collected a total of 20 Bundesliga appearances until the end of the season. He did not manage to score any goals in a total of 29 competitive appearances for Kaiserslautern and left the club in June 2006, shortly after they were relegated to the 2. Bundesliga with a 16th-place finish in the first division.

In July 2006, he came back to Croatia by signing with Rijeka and made his competitive debut for the club on 13 July 2006 in their first-leg first-round UEFA Cup qualifier against Cypriot club Omonia Nicosia. Omonia eliminated Rijeka from the competition in the second leg by winning 4–3 on aggregate. Mikić's domestic league debut for Rijeka came on 30 July 2006 in the club's opening match of the 2006–07 season, where they celebrated a 4–3 away victory against Cibalia.

In January 2007, Mikić left Rijeka after making only 14 domestic league appearances for the club and returned to his former club Dinamo Zagreb, making his domestic league debut in their 2–1 victory in derby against Hajduk Split on 24 February 2007.

On 25 December 2008, it was announced that Mikić moved to J. League side Sanfrecce Hiroshima.

== International career ==
Mikić could not crack the Croatian national A-team, but he had a fairly successful international career at youth level with the Croatian national under-19 and under-21 teams.

He debuted for the Croatian under-19 team on 3 November 1997 against Northern Ireland in their qualifying campaign for the 1998 European Under-18 Championship and subsequently made another two appearances for the team in the qualifying, scoring once. In July 1998, he was seen by many as the best player of the Croatian team at the European Under-18 Championship finals in Cyprus, where he scored three goals in four matches and helped the team to reach the third place after beating Portugal on penalty shootout. After the tournament, he made another four appearances and scored one goal for the team in their qualifying campaign for the 1999 European Under-18 Championship.

Mikić won his last international cap for the Croatian under-19 team on 24 March 1999 and went to make his debut for the country's under-21 team in their opening match of the 1999 World Youth Championship in Nigeria, against Ghana on 4 April 1999. He appeared in all four matches played by the Croatian team at the tournament before they were eliminated by Brazil in the round of 16. Until the end of the year 1999, he made five appearances and scored three goals for the Croatian under-21 team in their qualifying campaign for the 2000 European Under-21 Championship and subsequently also appeared in all three group matches at the final tournament in Slovakia, where Croatia was eliminated in the group stage. He continued to play for the Croatian under-21 team until November 2001, making six appearances and scoring three goals in their qualifying campaign for the 2002 European Under-21 Championship.

== Career statistics ==
Appearances and goals by club, season and competition
Club	Season	League			Cup		League Cup		Continental		Other		Total	
Club	Season	Division	Apps	Goals	Apps	Goals	Apps	Goals	Apps	Goals	Apps	Goals	Apps	Goals
Inker Zaprešić	1996–97	Prva HNL	25	5	0	0	—		—		—		25	5
Dinamo Zagreb	1997–98	Prva HNL	5	2	2	1	—		0	0	—		7	3
Dinamo Zagreb	1998–99	Prva HNL	15	6	1	0	—		3	1	—		19	7
Dinamo Zagreb	1999–00	Prva HNL	26	6	4	1	—		7	1	—		37	8
Dinamo Zagreb	2000–01	Prva HNL	28	3	7	2	—		2	0	—		37	5
Dinamo Zagreb	2001–02	Prva HNL	25	3	6	0	—		4	0	—		35	3
Dinamo Zagreb	2002–03	Prva HNL	28	3	1	0	—		4	0	1	0	29	3
Dinamo Zagreb	2003–04	Prva HNL	17	1	6	1	—		4	0	1	0	27	2
Dinamo Zagreb	Total		144	24	27	5	—		24	2	2	0	197	31
1. FC Kaiserslautern	2004–05	Bundesliga	6	0	2	0	—		—		—		8	0
1. FC Kaiserslautern	2005–06	Bundesliga	20	0	1	0	—		—		—		21	0
1. FC Kaiserslautern	Total		26	0	3	0	—		—		—		29	0
Rijeka	2006–07	Prva HNL	14	0	3	0	—		1	0	1	0	19	0
Dinamo Zagreb	2006–07	Prva HNL	10	3	4	0	—		0	0	—		14	3
Dinamo Zagreb	2007–08	Prva HNL	21	1	7	1	—		3	0	—		31	2
Dinamo Zagreb	2008–09	Prva HNL	15	0	2	1	—		6	0	—		23	1
Dinamo Zagreb	Total		46	4	13	2	—		9	0	—		68	6
Sanfrecce Hiroshima	2009	J1 League	25	0	0	0	5	0	—		—		30	0
Sanfrecce Hiroshima	2010	J1 League	16	1	2	1	4	0	0	0	—		22	2
Sanfrecce Hiroshima	2011	J1 League	31	2	1	0	1	0	—		—		33	2
Sanfrecce Hiroshima	2012	J1 League	28	0	0	0	1	0	—		—		29	0
Sanfrecce Hiroshima	2013	J1 League	29	2	4	0	2	0	4	0	0	0	39	2
Sanfrecce Hiroshima	2014	J1 League	20	0	1	0	2	0	4	0	1	0	28	0
Sanfrecce Hiroshima	2015	J1 League	33	1	2	0	1	0	—		3	0	39	1
Sanfrecce Hiroshima	2016	J1 League	27	1	1	0	1	0	1	0	1	0	31	1
Sanfrecce Hiroshima	2017	J1 League	14	1	0	0	1	0	—		—		15	1
Sanfrecce Hiroshima	Total		223	8	11	0	18	0	9	0	5	0	266	8
Shonan Bellmare	2018	J1 League	6	0	0	0	0	0	—		—		6	0
Career total			484	41	57	8	18	0	43	2	8	0	610	51

== Honours ==
Dinamo Zagreb

- Prva HNL: 1997–98, 1998–99, 1999–2000, 2002–03, 2006–07, 2007–08
- Croatian Cup: 1997–98, 2000–01, 2001–02, 2006–07, 2007–08
- Croatian Super Cup: 2002, 2003

Sanfrecce Hiroshima

- J. League Division 1: 2012, 2013, 2015
- Japanese Super Cup: 2013, 2014, 2016
