= Igor Gjuzelov =

Macedonian footballer

Personal information
- Full name: Igor Gjuzelov; Игор Ѓузелов
- Date of birth: 2 April 1976 (age 50)
- Place of birth: Strumica, SFR Yugoslavia
- Height: 1.85 m (6 ft 1 in)
- Position: Center back

Senior career*
Years	Team	Apps	(Gls)
1993–1995	Belasica	45	(0)
1995–1999	Sileks	110	(7)
1999–2001	Hajduk Split	62	(1)
2001–2002	Shakhtar Donetsk	2	(0)
2001–2002	→ Shakhtar-2 Donetsk	11	(0)
2002–2006	Metalurh Donetsk	75	(4)
2006	→ Hapoel Petah Tikva (loan)	6	(0)
2006–2011	Cercle Brugge	40	(0)

International career^{‡}
1998–2003	Macedonia	18	(1)
- * Club domestic league appearances and goals as of 29 July 2010 ‡ National team caps and goals as of 10 July 2007

Igor Gjuzelov or Igor Đuzelov (Macedonian: Игор Ѓузелов; born 2 April 1976), also known in some Turkish sources as İgor Güzelov, is a retired Macedonian professional football player. Gjuzelov is a central defender.

== Club career ==
Gjuzelov played for Belgian First division side Cercle Brugge until the 2010–11 season.

== International career ==
He made his senior debut for Macedonia in a March 1998 friendly match against Bulgaria in Skopje and has earned a total of 18 caps, scoring 1 goal. His final international was an October 2003 friendly away against Ukraine.

=== Honors ===
- FK Sileks

Champion:1996, 1997, 1998
Cup Winner: 1997

- HNK Hajduk Split

Champion:2001
Cup Winner: 2000

- Shakhtar Donetsk

Champion :2002
Cup Winner :2002
