= Stanko Bubalo =

Croatian footballer

Personal information
- Full name: Stanko Bubalo
- Date of birth: 26 April 1973 (age 53)
- Place of birth: Široki Brijeg, SFR Yugoslavia
- Height: 1.85 m (6 ft 1 in)
- Position: Striker

Senior career*
Years	Team	Apps	(Gls)
1995–1998	Široki Brijeg		
1998–2000	Osijek	62	(23)
2000–2001	Hajduk Split	26	(15)
2001–2007	Kärnten	133	(35)
2007–2009	Široki Brijeg	48	(14)
2009–2010	Posušje		

International career
1999–2000	Croatia	2	(0)
- * Club domestic league appearances and goals

Stanko Bubalo (born 26 April 1973 in Široki Brijeg) is a Croatian retired footballer who played as a striker.

== International career ==
He made two appearances for the Croatia national football team, making his debut against Mexico in a friendly game on 16 June 1999 and playing his final international in a May 2000 friendly against France.
