= Tomo Šokota =

Croatian footballer

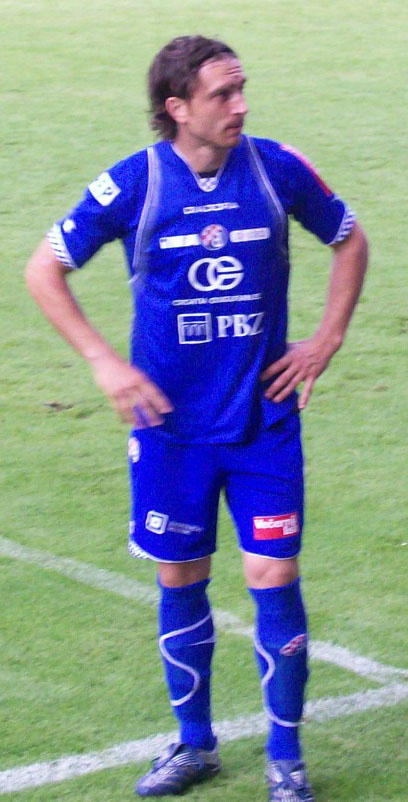
- Dinamo Zagreb

Personal information
- Full name: Tomislav Šokota
- Date of birth: 8 April 1977 (age 49)
- Place of birth: Zagreb, SFR Yugoslavia
- Height: 1.84 m (6 ft 1/2 in)
- Position: Striker

Senior career*
Years	Team	Apps	(Gls)
1996–1997	Samobor	24	(11)
1997–2001	Dinamo Zagreb	92	(49)
2001–2005	Benfica	60	(21)
2004–2005	Benfica B		
2005–2007	FC Porto	3	(0)
2007–2009	Dinamo Zagreb	20	(6)
2009–2010	Lokeren	27	(5)
2010–2011	Olimpija Ljubljana	19	(7)
2020	NŠK Sveti Mihovil	1	(0)

International career
2003–2004	Croatia	8	(2)
- * Club domestic league appearances and goals

Tomislav "Tomo" Šokota (born 8 April 1977) is a Croatian former footballer who played as a striker. Šokota was a powerful striker but his promising career was overshadowed by frequent injuries, especially in second half of the 2000s. Šokota gave his best performances during his first spell with Dinamo Zagreb (1997–2001) and at Portuguese side Benfica (2001–2005). He was also a Croatia international, capped eight times during the team's Euro 2004 campaign.

== Club career ==
Šokota joined Porto from rivals Benfica, where he played between 2001 and 2005. He previously played four seasons for Croatian First League side Dinamo Zagreb, who signed him to his first professional contract from his youth club NK Samobor in 1997. While playing for Dinamo Zagreb, he became the top goalscorer of the Croatian First League in both 1999–2000 and 2000–01 seasons, scoring 21 and 20 goals respectively. He also made several appearances in the UEFA Champions League with the club during their participations in the 1998 and 1999 group stages of the competition. Following his very successful 2000–01 season he was signed by Primeira Liga side Benfica. During his time with the Lisbon side he played up front alongside Norwegian striker Azar Karadas for two seasons.

By the end of 2004, and after refusing all Benfica's contract renewal proposals, Šokota was relegated to Benfica B, the club's reserve squad, where he eventually played for the rest of the 2004–05 season. On 25 January 2004, he played in a 1–0 away win against Vitória de Guimarães, a game overshadowed by the tragic death of his teammate Miklós Fehér. In June 2005, after his contract with Benfica finally expired, he joined rivals FC Porto on a free transfer.

He has been plagued by injuries in his time in Portugal, having undergone four major surgeries. While at FC Porto, his first injury was at the beginning of the 2005–06 season, and he only returned to an official match on the last day of the Portuguese league. Soon, in the 2006–07 pre-season, he had another injury and as a result he played his first Superliga match against Estrela Amadora on 3 February 2007. Šokota returned to his hometown club Dinamo Zagreb in March 2007 in which he played until July 2009. In July 2009 Šokota moved to the Belgian League, signing a contract with Lokeren. Following a year with the Belgian side he moved to Slovenian side Olimpija Ljubljana for the 2010–11 season.

== International career ==
Šokota debuted for the Croatia national team in their second-leg Euro 2004 qualifying play-off match versus Slovenia in November 2003 and also played all three matches at the Euro 2004 finals in Portugal before the Croatian team exited the competition in the group stage. Following UEFA Euro 2004, he was called up to be a part of the Croatian squad to play at the 2006 FIFA World Cup but due to a very serious injury he had to miss the tournament.

He won a total of eight caps and scored two goals for Croatia. His international goals came in friendlies against Turkey and Denmark.

=== International goals ===
Goal	Date	Venue	Opponent	Score	Result	Competition
1	31 March 2004	Maksimir, Zagreb	Turkey	1 – 0	2 – 2	Friendly
2	5 June 2004	Parken, Copenhagen	Denmark	1 – 0	2 – 1	Friendly

== Honours ==
=== Club ===
NK Samobor

- Croatian Second League: 1995–96 (West)

Dinamo Zagreb

- Croatian First League (5): 1997–98, 1998–99, 1999–2000, 2007–08, 2008–09
- Croatian Cup (4): 1997–98, 2000–01, 2007–08, 2008–09

Benfica

- Primeira Liga: 2004–05
- Taça de Portugal: 2003–04
- Supertaça Cândido de Oliveira: Runner-up 2004

Benfica B

- Terceira Divisão: 2004–05

Porto

- Primeira Liga: 2005–06, 2006–07
- Taça de Portugal: 2005–06
- Supertaça Cândido de Oliveira: 2006

=== Individual ===
- Croatian Football Hope of the Year: 1999
- Croatian First League Top scorer: 2000, 2001
- Taça de Portugal Co-Top scorer: 2004
