= Tomislav Gondžić =

Croatian footballer

Personal information
- Date of birth: 30 April 1980 (age 44)
- Place of birth: Zagreb, SFR Yugoslavia
- Height: 1.75 m (5 ft 9 in)
- Position(s): Midfielder, Forward

Senior career*
Years	Team	Apps	(Gls)
1996-1997	Inker Zaprešić	2	(0)
1997-1999	Croatia Zagreb	0	(0)
1999-2000	Croatia Sesvete		
2000-2001	Dinamo Zagreb	22	(3)
2002-2003	Zadar	30	(8)
2003-2006	Inter Zaprešić	59	(10)
2006-2008	SC Weiz	52	(36)
2009	NK Otočac		
2009-2010	NK Savski Marof		
2011-2013	NK Mladost Kraj Donji		
- *Club domestic league appearances and goals

Tomislav Gondžić (born 30 April 1980 in Croatia) is a Croatian retired professional footballer.

== Club career ==
Gondžić had a spell in the Austrian third and fourth tier, with SC Weiz.
