= Ivan Bošnjak (footballer) =

Croatian footballer

Personal information
- Date of birth: 6 February 1979 (age 47)
- Place of birth: Vinkovci, SR Croatia, Yugoslavia
- Height: 1.79 m (5 ft 10 1/2 in)
- Positions: Striker; winger

Youth career
- Cibalia

Senior career*
Years	Team	Apps	(Gls)
1996–2000	Cibalia	62	(23)
2000–2002	Hajduk Split	54	(9)
2002–2003	Al-Ittihad Tripoli	4	(1)
2003–2006	Dinamo Zagreb	62	(33)
2006–2009	Genk	59	(9)
2009–2010	Iraklis Thessaloniki	12	(0)
2011	Chongqing Lifan	22	(6)
2012	Rijeka	4	(0)
2013	DPMM	5	(0)
2014	Persija Jakarta	14	(4)
Total		298	(85)

International career
1993	Croatia U14	1	(0)
1995	Croatia U16	1	(0)
1997	Croatia U19	1	(0)
1999	Croatia U20	1	(0)
2000–2001	Croatia U21	7	(0)
2000–2006	Croatia	14	(1)
- * Club domestic league appearances and goals

Ivan Bošnjak (Croatian pronunciation: [ˈiʋan ˈbɔʃɲak]; born 6 February 1979) is a Croatian retired professional footballer who played as a forward. He spent most of his career playing for boyhood club HNK Cibalia, Dinamo Zagreb and Hajduk Split in his native Croatia, as well as Genk in Belgium and Chongqing Lifan in China.

== Club career ==
Bošnjak started his professional career at local club HNK Cibalia in the 1996–97 season. He went on to move to Hajduk Split in 2000 and left the club after two seasons for Al-Ittihad Tripoli from Libya, where he spent a season without getting a chance to make a single appearance in an official match. He came back to Croatia by signing with Dinamo Zagreb in 2004. At the club level, he had his biggest personal successes while being named the best player of the Croatian First League in 2000 and becoming the league's top goalscorer in 2006 with 22 goals scored. He transferred to China League One club Chongqing Lifan in the 2011 season. In March 2012, Bošnjak joined Rijeka in his native country. He agreed terms with Brunei's DPMM FC in February 2013, but only lasted at the S.League club until May. The following year, Bošnjak moved to Persija Jakarta.

== International career ==
Bošnjak played for the Croatia national team and collected a total of 14 international caps in which he managed to score one goal. He made his debut for the Croatian team in their friendly match against Slovakia on 16 August 2000 in Bratislava, but subsequently made only one more appearance for the team over a timespan of more than four years before eventually becoming their regular member in 2005 by making six appearances in the 2006 FIFA World Cup qualifying. He went on to score his first goal for Croatia in their friendly match against Hong Kong at the 2006 Carlsberg Cup in Hong Kong and was then also selected to be part of the Croatian squad at the 2006 World Cup finals in Germany, but played at the tournament for only four minutes of regular time in Croatia's second group match against Japan.

=== International appearances ===
Croatia national team
Year	Apps	Goals
2000	1	0
2002	1	0
2005	7	0
2006	5	1
Total	14	1

== Honours ==
=== Club ===
Cibalia

- Croatian Second League: 1997–98 (East)

Hajduk Split

- Croatian First League: 2000–01

Al-Ittihad Tripoli

- Libyan Premier League: 2002–03
- Libyan Super Cup: 2002

Dinamo Zagreb

- Croatian First League: 2005–06
- Croatian Cup: 2004

Genk

- Belgian Cup: 2009

=== Individual ===
- SN Yellow Shirt Award: 2000
- Heart of Hajduk Award: 2001
- Croatian First League Top Scorer: 2006
