= Dražice =

Dražice may refer to places:

- Dražice, Croatia, a village in Croatia
- Dražice (Tábor District), a municipality and village in the Czech Republic
- Dražice, a village and part of Benátky nad Jizerou in the Czech Republic
- Dražice, Rimavská Sobota District, a municipality and village in Slovakia

== See also ==
- Dražíč, a municipality and village in the Czech Republic
- Darko Dražić, a Croatian footballer
- Dražica, a settlement in Slovenia
- Dražičky, a municipality and village in the Czech Republic
