= 2015–16 HNK Rijeka season =

Rijeka
2015–16 season
- Chairman: Damir Mišković
- Manager: Matjaž Kek
- Stadium: Kantrida (Jul 2015); Rujevica (from Aug 2015)
- Prva HNL: 2nd
- Croatian Cup: Semi-final
- UEFA Europa League: Second qualifying round
- Top goalscorer: League: Roman Bezjak (13); All: Roman Bezjak (17)
- Highest home attendance: 8,200 v Aberdeen (16 July 2015)
- Lowest home attendance: 2,522 v RNK Split (1 May 2016)
- Average home league attendance: 4,216
Home colours	Away colours	Third colours

The 2015–16 season was the 70th season in HNK Rijeka’s history. It was their 25th successive season in the Prva HNL, and 42nd successive top tier season.

== Competitions ==
=== Overall ===
Competition	First match	Last match	Starting round	Final position	Record							
Competition	First match	Last match	Starting round	Final position	G	W	D	L	GF	GA	GD	Win %
MAXtv Prva Liga	10 Jul 2015	14 May 2016	Matchday 1	Runners-up	36	21	14	1	56	20	+36	58.33
Croatian Cup	23 Sep 2015	5 Apr 2016	First round	Semi-final	5	4	0	1	16	4	+12	80.00
UEFA Europa League	16 Jul 2015	23 Jul 2015	QR2	QR2	2	0	1	1	2	5	−3	0.00
Total					43	25	15	3	74	29	+45	58.14

Last updated: 14 May 2016.

=== MAXtv Prva Liga ===
==== Table ====
Pos	Team	Pld	W	D	L	GF	GA	GD	Pts	Qualification or relegation
1	Dinamo Zagreb (C)	36	26	7	3	67	19	+48	85	Qualification for the Champions League second qualifying round (Note: Dinamo Zagreb qualified for the Europa League third qualifying round by winning the 2015–16 Croatian Football Cup. However, since they already qualified for European competition based on their league position, the spot awarded to the cup winners was passed down the league.)
2	Rijeka	36	21	14	1	56	20	+36	77	Qualification for the Europa League third qualifying round
3	Hajduk Split	36	17	10	9	46	28	+18	61	Qualification for the Europa League second qualifying round
4	Lokomotiva	36	16	4	16	56	53	+3	52	Qualification for the Europa League first qualifying round
5	Inter Zaprešić	36	11	14	11	39	48	−9	47	

Source: PrvaHNL.hr, Soccerway
Rules for classification: 1) Points; 2) Head-to-head points; 3) Head-to-head goal difference; 4) Head-to-head goals scored (at home if two teams tied); 5) Goal difference; 6) Goals scored; 7) Play-off
(Note: Criteria 2–4 and 7 is only used if deciding Champion, teams to international competition or teams for relegation and in that case criteria 6 will not be used).
(C) Champions

==== Results summary ====
Overall								Home						Away					
Pld	W	D	L	GF	GA	GD	Pts	W	D	L	GF	GA	GD	W	D	L	GF	GA	GD
36	21	14	1	56	20	+36	77	12	6	0	35	9	+26	9	8	1	21	11	+10

Last updated: 14 May 2016.
Source: Sportnet.hr

==== Results by round ====
Round	1	2	3	4	5	6	7	8	9	10	11	12	13	14	15	16	17	18	19	20	21	22	23	24	25	26	27	28	29	30	31	32	33	34	35	36
Ground	A	H	A	H	A	H	A	H	A	H	A	H	A	H	A	H	A	H	A	H	A	H	A	H	A	H	A	H	A	H	A	H	A	H	A	H
Result	D	D	D	W	D	D	W	W	W	D	D	W	W	W	W	W	D	W	D	D	W	W	L	W	W	W	W	W	D	W	W	D	W	D	D	W
Position	6	5	6	4	4	4	2	2	2	2	3	3	3	2	1	1	1	1	2	2	2	2	2	2	2	2	2	2	2	2	2	2	2	2	2	2

Updated to match(es) played on 14 May 2016. Source: Competitive matches
A = Away; H = Home; W = Win; D = Draw; L = Loss

==== Results by opponent ====
Team	Results				Points
Team	1	2	3	4	Points
Dinamo Zagreb	0–0	2–1	0–3	0–0	5
Hajduk Split	0–0	3–0	1–0	2–1	10
Inter Zaprešić	0–0	0–0	0–0	4–0	6
Istra 1961	1–0	1–0	1–0	2–0	12
Lokomotiva	3–1	2–1	2–0	1–0	12
Osijek	5–0	1–1	2–1	1–1	8
Slaven Belupo	3–3	0–0	1–1	0–0	4
Split	2–0	2–1	2–1	0–0	10
Zagreb	3–3	4–1	2–0	3–0	10

Source: 2015–16 Croatian First Football League article

== Matches ==
=== MAXtv Prva Liga ===
10 July 2015 1	Inter Zaprešić	0–0	Rijeka	Zaprešić
20:00 CEST (UTC+02:00)	Komorski (yellow card) 33'; Mazalović (yellow card) 35'; Hanžek (yellow card) 49'; Čeliković (yellow card) 90+3'; Bočkaj (yellow card) 90+3'	Report	Leovac (yellow card) 18'; Kvržić (yellow card) 35'; Lešković (penalty missed) 51'; Močinić (yellow card) 52'	Stadium: ŠRC Zaprešić; Attendance: 3,380; Referee: Goran Gabrilo (Split)

19 July 2015 2	Rijeka	3–3	Slaven Belupo	Rijeka
21:00 CEST (UTC+02:00)	Moisés (penalty missed) 41'; Bezjak 45+1', 82'; Leovac (yellow card) 66'; Balaj 67'	Report	Ejupi 9', 48' (pen.); Mikulić (yellow card) 41'; Paracki (yellow card) 42'; Križman 88'	Stadium: Kantrida; Attendance: 4,203; Referee: Dalibor Mlakar (Zagreb)

26 July 2015 3	Zagreb	3–3	Rijeka	Zagreb
19:00 CEST (UTC+02:00)	Boban 26', 34'; Ljubičić (yellow card) 27'; Krovinović 73'	Report	Bradarić (yellow card) 13'; Balaj 24', 32'; Samardžić (yellow card) 75'; Bezjak 78'; Radošević (yellow card) 69' (yellow-red card) 79'	Stadium: Kranjčevićeva; Attendance: 800; Referee: Damir Batinić (Osijek)

2 August 2015 4	Rijeka	3–1	Lokomotiva	Rijeka
21:00 CEST (UTC+02:00)	Leovac 6'; Samardžić (yellow card) 28'; Bezjak 36' (yellow card) 50'; Mitrović (yellow card) 38'; Bradarić (yellow card) 52'; Sharbini 60' (yellow card) 60'	Report	Prenga (yellow card) 23'; Andrijašević 25' (yellow card) 55'; Leko (yellow card) 44'; Bručić (yellow card) 79'	Stadium: Rujevica; Attendance: 5,454; Referee: Duje Strukan (Split)

8 August 2015 5	Dinamo Zagreb	0–0	Rijeka	Zagreb
21:00 CEST (UTC+02:00)	Taravel (yellow card) 67'	Report	Maleš (yellow card) 4'; Balaj (yellow card) 15'; Sharbini (yellow card) 39'; Ristovski (yellow card) 40'; Leovac (yellow card) 77'; Bezjak (red card) 82'	Stadium: Maksimir; Attendance: 5,200; Referee: Mario Zebec (Cestica)

15 August 2015 6	Rijeka	0–0	Hajduk Split	Rijeka
19:00 CEST (UTC+02:00)	Moisés (red card) 16'; Sharbini (yellow card) 62'	Report	Vlašić (yellow card) 15'; Caktaš (yellow card) 22'; Nižić (yellow card) 36'; Jefferson (yellow card) 57'; Velázquez (red card) 64'; Sušić (yellow card) 65'	Stadium: Rujevica; Attendance: 5,287; Referee: Marijo Strahonja (Zagreb)

22 August 2015 7	RNK Split	0–2	Rijeka	Split
19:00 CEST (UTC+02:00)	Vidović (yellow card) 17'; Obšivač (yellow card) 22'; Mršić (yellow card) 63'	Report	Tomasov 7', 84' (yellow card) 56'; Roshi (yellow card) 33'; Balaj (yellow card) 44'; Lešković (red card) 59'	Stadium: Park Mladeži; Attendance: 1,000; Referee: Tihomin Pejin (Donji Miholjac)

30 August 2015 8	Rijeka	5–0	Osijek	Rijeka
21:00 CEST (UTC+02:00)	Samardžić (yellow card) 11'; Balaj 16', 49'; Bezjak 32'; Mitrović 43'; Bradarić (yellow card) 51'; Sharbini 90+3'	Report	Radotić (yellow card) 14'; Roce (yellow card) 17'; Džolan (yellow card) 24'; Lesjak (yellow card) 74'	Stadium: Rujevica; Attendance: 4,729; Referee: Duje Strukan (Split)

13 September 2015 9	Istra 1961	0–1	Rijeka	Pula
19:00 CEST (UTC+02:00)	Žižić (yellow card) 10'; Mišić (yellow card) 42'; Bouhna (yellow card) 64'	Report	Bezjak 9'; Močinić (yellow card) 29'; Lešković (yellow card) 36'; Maleš (yellow card) 57'; Radošević (yellow card) 89'	Stadium: Aldo Drosina; Attendance: 3,012; Referee: Fran Jović (Zagreb)

19 September 2015 10	Rijeka	0–0	Inter Zaprešić	Rijeka
19:15 CEST (UTC+02:00)	Vešović (yellow card) 47'; Bradarić (penalty missed) 90+1'	Report	Begić (yellow card) 34'; Blažević (yellow card) 47'; Glavina (yellow card) 71'; Komorski (yellow card) 90'	Stadium: Rujevica; Attendance: 4,221; Referee: Ante Vučemilović-Šimunović (Osijek)

26 September 2015 11	Slaven Belupo	0–0	Rijeka	Koprivnica
19:00 CEST (UTC+02:00)	Rozman (yellow card) 83'	Report	Močinić (yellow card) 89'	Stadium: Gradski; Attendance: 744; Referee: Damir Batinić (Osijek)

4 October 2015 12	Rijeka	4–1	Zagreb	Rijeka
19:00 CEST (UTC+02:00)	Moisés 3' (yellow card) 53'; Ristovski (yellow card) 19'; Bradarić (yellow card) 45' (yellow-red card) 75'; Roshi 79'; Radošević 83'; Balaj 85'	Report	Šulc (yellow card) 8'; Bevab (yellow card) 24'; Šehić (yellow card) 58'; Boban 88'	Stadium: Rujevica; Attendance: 3,358; Referee: Igor Križarić (Čakovec)

17 October 2015 13	Lokomotiva	1–2	Rijeka	Zagreb
19:00 CEST (UTC+02:00)	Fiolić (yellow card) 16'; Perić 23'; Barišić (yellow card) 86'; Prenga (yellow card) 90+2'	Report	Maleš 48'; Lešković 71'	Stadium: Kranjčevićeva; Attendance: 682; Referee: Damir Batinić (Osijek)

25 October 2015 14	Rijeka	2–1	Dinamo Zagreb	Rijeka
15:00 CET (UTC+01:00)	Samardžić (yellow card) 3' (goal) 50'; Bezjak (yellow card) 30'; Vešović (yellow card) 34'; Moisés (yellow card) 36'; Maleš (yellow card) 87'; Sharbini 90+1' (yellow card) 90+1'	Report	Fernandes 6'; Mățel (yellow card) 32'; Taravel (red card) 34'; Antolić (yellow card) 41'	Stadium: Rujevica; Attendance: 5,474; Referee: Marko Matoc (Zaprešić)

1 November 2015 15	Hajduk Split	0–3	Rijeka	Split
17:00 CET (UTC+01:00)		Report	Bezjak 28'; Tomasov 42' (yellow card) 44'; Balaj 50' (yellow card) 87'; Bradarić (yellow card) 71'	Stadium: Poljud; Attendance: 24,621; Referee: Marijo Strahonja (Zaprešić)

8 November 2015 16	Rijeka	2–1	RNK Split	Rijeka
19:00 CET (UTC+01:00)	Samardžić 3'; Moisés (yellow card) 33'; Bezjak 37'; Tomasov (penalty missed) 43'; Vargić (yellow card) 48'; Sharbini (yellow card) 68'	Report	Majstorović (yellow card) 42'; Mršić 49' (pen.); Vrgoč (yellow card) 66'	Stadium: Rujevica; Attendance: 5,201; Referee: Fran Jović (Zagreb)

21 November 2015 17	Osijek	1–1	Rijeka	Osijek
15:00 CET (UTC+01:00)	Škorić 90+7' (pen.)	Report	Bezjak (yellow card) 29' (goal) 45'; Maleš (yellow card) 41'; Močinić (yellow card) 73'; Samardžić (yellow card) 79'; Bradarić (yellow card) 90+3'	Stadium: Gradski vrt Attendance: 517; Referee: Marko Matoc (Zaprešić)

28 November 2015 18	Rijeka	1–0	Istra 1961	Rijeka
17:00 CET (UTC+01:00)	Tomasov 18'; Močinić (yellow card) 56'; Zuta (yellow card) 83'	Report	Tomić (yellow card) 66'; Nikolić (yellow card) 74'	Stadium: Rujevica; Attendance: 4,180; Referee: Tihomin Pejin (Donji Miholjac)

4 December 2015 19	Inter Zaprešić	0–0	Rijeka	Zaprešić
18:00 CET (UTC+01:00)		Report	Balaj (yellow card) 39'; Maleš (yellow card) 41'; Vešović (yellow card) 52'; Zuta (yellow card) 68'	Stadium: ŠRC Zaprešić; Attendance: 514; Referee: Mario Zebec (Cestica)

13 December 2015 20	Rijeka	1–1	Slaven Belupo	Rijeka
17:00 CET (UTC+01:00)	Tomasov 25'; Maleš (yellow card) 56'; Bradarić (yellow card) 90+1'	Report	Arap 71'; Štiglec (yellow card) 81'	Stadium: Rujevica; Attendance: 3,048; Referee: Damir Batinić (Osijek)

18 December 2015 21	Zagreb	0–2	Rijeka	Zagreb
18:00 CET (UTC+01:00)	Ćubel (yellow card) 15'; Ćavar (yellow card) 29'	Report	Ristovski (yellow card) 24'; Bezjak 53', 63'	Stadium: Kranjčevićeva; Attendance: 600; Referee: Duje Strukan (Split)

12 February 2016 22	Rijeka	2–0	Lokomotiva	Rijeka
18:00 CET (UTC+01:00)	Tomasov 18'; Samardžić (yellow card) 23'; Gavranović 25'; Balaj (yellow card) 88'	Report	Capan (yellow card) 17'; Prenga (yellow card) 54'; Pamić (yellow card) 65'	Stadium: Rujevica; Attendance: 3,200; Referee: Andrej Burilo (Osijek)

21 February 2016 23	Dinamo Zagreb	3–0	Rijeka	Zagreb
17:00 CET (UTC+01:00)	Soudani 64', 90+2'; Sigali (yellow card) 51' (goal) 83'; Schildenfeld (yellow card) 85'	Report	Gavranović (yellow card) 27'; Maleš (yellow card) 45'; Brezovec (yellow card) 57'; Bezjak (yellow card) 67'	Stadium: Maksimir; Attendance: 10,075; Referee: Ante Vučemilović-Šimunović (Osijek)

27 February 2016 24	Rijeka	1–0	Hajduk Split	Rijeka
17:00 CET (UTC+01:00)	Matei (yellow card) 11'; Maleš (yellow card) 45+1' (yellow-red card) 66'; Samardžić 49'; Brezovec (yellow card) 77'; Močinić (yellow card) 77'	Report	Mastelić (yellow card) 27'; Jefferson (yellow card) 41'	Stadium: Rujevica; Attendance: 5,450; Referee: Damir Batinić (Osijek)

2 March 2016 25	RNK Split	1–2	Rijeka	Split
19:00 CET (UTC+01:00)	Bagarić (penalty missed) 45'; Rrahmani 45+1'; Jakić (yellow card) 51'; Špehar (yellow card) 59'; Majstorović (yellow card) 70'; Arroyo (yellow card) 87'	Report	Matei (yellow card) 30'; Gavranović 32'; Samardžić (yellow card) 34'; Zuta (yellow card) 45'; Balaj 74' (yellow card) 72' (yellow-red card) 76'; Mitrović (yellow card) 82'	Stadium: Park Mladeži; Attendance: 1,000; Referee: Dalibor Mlakar (Zagreb)

6 March 2016 26	Rijeka	2–1	Osijek	Rijeka
17:00 CET (UTC+01:00)	Samardžić (yellow card) 39'; Bezjak (yellow card) 45' (goal) 90+2'; Gavranović 52'; Močinić (yellow card) 80'; Maleš (yellow card) 87'	Report	Šarić (yellow card) 15'; Šorša (yellow card) 32'; Grgić (yellow card) 60'; Roce (yellow card) 80'; Špičić (yellow card) 85'; Perošević 89' (pen.)	Stadium: Rujevica; Attendance: 3,736; Referee: Fran Jović (Zagreb)

12 March 2016 27	Istra 1961	0–1	Rijeka	Pula
17:00 CET (UTC+01:00)	Žižić (yellow card) 23'; Đurić (yellow card) 23'	Report	Tomasov 52'; Zuta (yellow card) 69'; Bradarić (yellow card) 71'	Stadium: Aldo Drosina; Attendance: 2,251; Referee: Ante Vučemilović-Šimunović (Osijek)

19 March 2016 28	Rijeka	4–0	Inter Zaprešić	Rijeka
17:00 CET (UTC+01:00)	Tomasov 4'; Gavranović 18'; Samardžić 65'; Balaj 67'; Mitrović (yellow card) 69'	Report	Bočkaj (yellow card) 36'	Stadium: Rujevica; Attendance: 3,691; Referee: Duje Strukan (Split)

2 April 2016 29	Slaven Belupo	0–0	Rijeka	Koprivnica
19:00 CEST (UTC+02:00)		Report	Gavranović (yellow card) 49'	Stadium: Gradski; Attendance: 1,507; Referee: Fran Jović (Zagreb)

9 April 2016 30	Rijeka	3–0	Zagreb	Rijeka
19:00 CEST (UTC+02:00)	Bradarić 19'; Bezjak 21' (yellow card) 68'; Maleš (yellow card) 49'; Matei 51'; Močinić (yellow card) 75'	Report	Strasser (yellow card) 40'; Musa (yellow card) 65'; Šulc (yellow card) 86'	Stadium: Rujevica; Attendance: 3,033; Referee: Željko Frković (Gospić)

16 April 2016 31	Lokomotiva	0–1	Rijeka	Zagreb
15:00 CEST (UTC+02:00)	Marić (penalty missed) 49'	Report	Brezovec (yellow card) 39'; Gavranović 59'; Zuta (yellow card) 77'; Vargić (yellow card) 88'	Stadium: Kranjčevićeva; Attendance: 867; Referee: Marko Matoc (Zaprešić)

19 April 2016 32	Rijeka	0–0	Dinamo Zagreb	Rijeka
20:00 CEST (UTC+02:00)		Report	Sigali (yellow card) 75'	Stadium: Rujevica; Attendance: 5,776; Referee: Bruno Marić (Daruvar)

24 April 2016 33	Hajduk Split	1–2	Rijeka	Split
15:00 CEST (UTC+02:00)	Sušić 25'	Report	Maleš (yellow card) 36'; Balaj (yellow card) 37'; Vešović 57'; Gavranović 79'	Stadium: Poljud; Attendance: 6,369; Referee: Fran Jović (Zagreb)

1 May 2016 34	Rijeka	0–0	RNK Split	Rijeka
19:00 CEST (UTC+02:00)	Bradarić (yellow card) 19'; Samardžić (yellow card) 23'; Maleš (yellow card) 70'	Report	Oremuš (yellow card) 60'; Bárcenas (yellow card) 64'; Vidović (yellow card) 64'; Franjić (yellow card) 68'	Stadium: Rujevica; Attendance: 2,522; Referee: Ante Vučemilović-Šimunović (Osijek)

7 May 2016 35	Osijek	1–1	Rijeka	Osijek
19:00 CEST (UTC+02:00)	Perošević (yellow card) 17'; Knežević (yellow card) 34'; Špoljarić (yellow card) 61'; Vojnović (yellow card) 77'; Lukić 90' (yellow card) 90'	Report	Močinić (yellow card) 25'; Gavranović 54'; Bradarić (yellow card) 65'	Stadium: Gradski vrt Attendance: 1,712; Referee: Bruno Marić (Daruvar)

14 May 2016 36	Rijeka	2–0	Istra 1961	Rijeka
17:00 CEST (UTC+02:00)	Vešović 32'; Brezovec 52'	Report		Stadium: Rujevica; Attendance: 3,322; Referee: Goran Gabrilo (Split)

Source: Croatian Football Federation

=== Croatian Cup ===
23 September 2015 R1	Bednja	0–10	Rijeka	Beletinec
15:30 CEST (UTC+02:00)		Report	Moisés 7'; Tomasov 21', 50', 70', 78'; Samardžić 31', 34'; Zuta (yellow card) 38'; Balaj 41'; Bezjak 81'; Bradarić 89'	Stadium: Kraj mosta Attendance: 1,500; Referee: Fran Jović (Zagreb)

28 October 2015 R2	Opatija	0–3	Rijeka	Opatija
14:00 CET (UTC+01:00)		Report	Moisés (yellow card) 52'; Tomasov 54'; Zuta (yellow card) 64'; Bezjak 70'; Roshi 79'	Stadium: Igralište Opatije; Attendance: 800; Referee: Dalibor Mlakar (Zagreb)

8 December 2015 QF	Lokomotiva	0–1	Rijeka	Zagreb
17:00 CET (UTC+01:00)	Grezda (yellow card) 11'; Mrčela (yellow card) 33'; Puljić (yellow card) 37'; Leko (yellow card) 42'	Report	Zuta (yellow card) 50'; Bezjak 65' (yellow card) 88'; Tomasov (yellow card) 83'; Vešović (yellow card) 90+1'	Stadium: Kranjčevićeva; Attendance: 300; Referee: Bruno Marić (Daruvar)

15 March 2016 SF	Rijeka	2–1	Slaven Belupo	Rijeka
18:00 CET (UTC+01:00)	Bezjak 10'; Matei 15'	Report	Musa (yellow card) 31'; Christensen 71'; Delić (yellow card) 90+1'	Stadium: Rujevica; Attendance: 4,596; Referee: Mario Zebec (Cestica)

5 April 2016 SF	Slaven Belupo	3–0 (4–2 agg.)	Rijeka	Koprivnica
17:30 CEST (UTC+02:00)	Christensen (yellow card) 9'; Ejupi 43'; Ozobić 54'; Pokrivač 72' (yellow card) 77'	Report	Brezovec (yellow card) 15'; Mitrović (yellow card) 16'; Samardžić (yellow card) 53'	Stadium: Gradski; Attendance: 2,500; Referee: Damir Batinić (Osijek)

Source: Croatian Football Federation

=== UEFA Europa League ===
16 July 2015 QR2	Rijeka (Croatia)	0–3	(Scotland) Aberdeen	Rijeka, Croatia
21:00 CEST (UTC+02:00)	Leovac (yellow card) 55'; Lešković (yellow card) 67'	Report	Considine 38'; Pawlett 52'; McLean 75'	Stadium: Kantrida; Attendance: 8,200; Referee: Amaury Delerue (France)

23 July 2015 QR2	Aberdeen (Scotland)	2–2 (5–2 agg.)	(Croatia) Rijeka	Aberdeen, Scotland
20:45 CEST (UTC+02:00)	McGinn 64'; Shinnie (yellow card) 71'; Hayes 72'; Logan (yellow card) 90+2'	Report	Tomasov 58'; Kvržić 63' (yellow card) 67'	Stadium: Pittodrie; Attendance: 15,803; Referee: Marco Guida (Italy)

Source: uefa.com

=== Friendlies ===
==== Pre-season ====
17 June 2015 Friendly	Rijeka	7–1	Rijeka All Stars	Rijeka
	Balaj 34', 62'; Močinić 44'; Bezjak 76'; Roshi 82'; Dangubić 87'; Tomasov 88'	Report	Krstanović 40'	Stadium: Kantrida; Attendance: 4,000; Referee: Domagoj Vučkov (Rijeka)

24 June 2015 Friendly	Triglav Kranj (Slovenia)	0–8	(Croatia) Rijeka	Kranjska Gora, Slovenia
		Report	Zlomislić 12'; Balaj 19'; Ajayi 34'; Bezjak 48', 68'; Jugović 76'; Bradarić 78' (pen.); Sharbini 83'	Stadium: Športni park Rudeč; Attendance: – Referee: Andraž Stojanoski (Kranj)

27 June 2015 Friendly	Rudar Velenje (Slovenia)	0–5	(Croatia) Rijeka	Kranjska Gora, Slovenia
		Report	Tomasov 52'; Balaj 54', 64'; Ajayi 75'; Hristov 90'	Stadium: Športni park Rudeč; Attendance: – Referee: Nejc Kajtazovič (Kranj)

30 June 2015 Friendly	Krka Novo Mesto (Slovenia)	0–4	(Croatia) Rijeka	Kranjska Gora, Slovenia
		Report	Bezjak 9'; Hristov 35', 87'; Balaj 74'	Stadium: Športni park Rudeč; Attendance: – Referee: Andrej Žnidaršič (Kranj)

3 July 2015 Friendly	Rijeka (Croatia)	3–1	(Bosnia and Herzegovina) Sarajevo	Kranjska Gora, Slovenia
17:30 CEST (UTC+02:00)	Sharbini 57'; Tomečak 61'; Kvržić 79'	Report	Puzigaća 33'	Stadium: Športni park Rudeč; Attendance: – Referee: Andrej Žnidaršič (Kranj)

==== On-season (2015) ====
25 August 2015 Friendly	Rijeka	9–1	Orijent 1919	Rijeka
	Vizinger 16', 52'; Sharbini 30'; Bezjak 63'; Močinić 69'; Roshi 72'; Tomečak 75', 81'; Bradarić 90'	Report	Omerović 64'	Stadium: Rujevica; Attendance: 2,000; Referee: Danijel Trbulin (Rijeka)

2 September 2015 Friendly	Rijeka	3–1	Lošinj	Rijeka
	Sharbini 40'; Bajić 46'; Budan 90'	Report	Brdar 64'	Stadium: Rujevica; Attendance: 1,000; Referee: Vedran Jelenčić (Rijeka)

8 September 2015 Friendly	Rudar Labin	0–6	Rijeka	Labin
		Report	Tomasov (red card) 51'; Bezjak 54'; Sharbini 57'; Lešković 65'; Cisotti 77'; Ikić 82' (pen.) 85'	Stadium: Gradski; Attendance: 800; Referee: Petar Pejkunović (Potpićan)

29 September 2015 Friendly	Rječina	0–4	Rijeka	Dražice
		Report	Sharbini 33'; Jugović 60', 68'; Bezjak 65'	Stadium: Igralište Rječine; Attendance: 600; Referee: Marko Linić (Dražice)

13 October 2015 Friendly	Rijeka	7–1	Vinodol	Rijeka
	Sharbini 5', 25'; Cisotti 49'; Nakić 57'; Gerald 61'; Vizinger 64', 87'	Report	Tomić 68' (pen.)	Stadium: Rujevica; Attendance: – Referee: Vladimir Merle (Rijeka)

==== Mid-season ====
20 January 2016 Friendly	Rijeka (Croatia)	1–0	(Qatar) Al-Gharafa	Abu Dhabi, United Arab Emirates
17:00 GST (UTC+04:00)	Bezjak 83'	Report		Stadium: Al-Wahda F.C. training camp (field 2); Attendance: 100; Referee: Ali Karimi (United Arab Emirates)

24 January 2016 Friendly	Dubai (United Arab Emirates)	0–4	(Croatia) Rijeka	Dubai, United Arab Emirates
17:00 GST (UTC+04:00)		Report	Gavranović 7'; Rashed 24' (o.g.); Bezjak 40'; Zuta (red card) 42'; Balaj 50'	Stadium: Dubai Club Stadium; Attendance: 100; Referee: Ali Karimi (United Arab Emirates)

30 January 2016 Friendly	Rijeka (Croatia)	1–0	(Slovenia) Gorica	Rijeka, Croatia
17:00 CET (UTC+01:00)	Balaj 55'	Report		Stadium: Rujevica; Attendance: 1,600; Referee: Vedran Jelenčić (Kastav)

2 February 2016 Friendly	Rijeka (Croatia)	5–0	(Slovenia) Rudar Velenje	Rijeka, Croatia
17:00 CET (UTC+01:00)	Balaj 25', 32'; Gavranović 28' (pen.); Kajević 52'; Rebernik 75'	Report		Stadium: Rujevica; Attendance: 1,000; Referee: Marko Linić (Dražice)

6 February 2016 Friendly	Rijeka (Croatia)	2–1	(Bosnia and Herzegovina) Široki Brijeg	Rijeka, Croatia
17:00 CET (UTC+01:00)	Kajević 84'; Bezjak 86'	Report	Kožulj 49'	Stadium: Rujevica; Attendance: 2,000; Referee: Vedran Jelenčić (Kastav)

==== On-season (2016) ====
16 February 2016 Friendly	Rijeka (Croatia)	6–0	(Slovenia) Zavrč	Rijeka, Croatia
				Stadium: Rujevica; Attendance: Behind closed doors

25 March 2016 Friendly	Rijeka (Croatia)	4–2	(Slovenia) Krško	Rijeka, Croatia
	Brezovec 70'; Tomasov 80', 87', 90'		Đurković 23'; Pavič 45'	Stadium: Rujevica; Attendance: Behind closed doors Referee: Ivan Bebek (Rijeka)

== Player seasonal records ==
Updated 14 May 2016. Competitive matches only.

=== Goals ===
Rank	Name	League	Europe	Cup	Total
1	(Slovenia) Roman Bezjak	13	–	4	17
2	(Croatia) Marin Tomasov	8	1	5	14
3	(Albania) Bekim Balaj	9	–	1	10
4	(Switzerland) Mario Gavranović	7	–	–	7
5	(Slovenia) Miral Samardžić	4	–	2	6
6	(Croatia) Anas Sharbini	3	–	–	3
7	(Montenegro) Marko Vešović	2	–	–	2
7	(Croatia) Filip Bradarić	1	–	1	2
7	(Romania) Florentin Matei	1	–	1	2
7	(Brazil) Moisés Lima Magalhães	1	–	1	2
7	(Albania) Odise Roshi	1	–	1	2
12	(Croatia) Josip Brezovec	1	–	–	1
12	(Croatia) Marin Leovac	1	–	–	1
12	(Croatia) Marko Lešković	1	–	–	1
12	(Croatia) Mate Maleš	1	–	–	1
12	(Croatia) Matej Mitrović	1	–	–	1
12	(Croatia) Josip Radošević	1	–	–	1
12	(Bosnia and Herzegovina) Zoran Kvržić	–	1	–	1
TOTALS		56	2	16	74

Source: Competitive matches

=== Assists ===
Rank	Name	League	Europe	Cup	Total
1	(Croatia) Marin Tomasov	12	–	3	15
2	(Slovenia) Roman Bezjak	5	–	1	6
2	(North Macedonia) Stefan Ristovski	4	–	2	6
4	(Romania) Florentin Matei	4	–	1	5
5	(Croatia) Ivan Močinić	4	–	–	4
6	(Croatia) Vedran Jugović	3	–	–	3
6	(Montenegro) Marko Vešović	3	–	–	3
6	(Croatia) Josip Radošević	2	1	–	3
6	(North Macedonia) Leonard Zuta	–	–	3	3
10	(Albania) Bekim Balaj	2	–	–	2
10	(Croatia) Josip Brezovec	2	–	–	2
10	(Croatia) Mate Maleš	2	–	–	2
10	(Croatia) Filip Bradarić	1	–	1	2
14	(Switzerland) Mario Gavranović	1	–	–	1
14	(Croatia) Marko Lešković	1	–	–	1
14	(Croatia) Matej Mitrović	1	–	–	1
14	(Albania) Odise Roshi	1	–	–	1
14	(Croatia) Anas Sharbini	1	–	–	1
14	(Croatia) Ivan Vargić	1	–	–	1
14	(Bosnia and Herzegovina) Zoran Kvržić	–	1	–	1
14	(Brazil) Moisés Lima Magalhães	–	–	1	1
TOTALS		50	2	12	64

Source: Competitive matches

=== Clean sheets ===
Rank	Name	League	Europe	Cup	Total
1	(Croatia) Ivan Vargić	21	–	1	22
2	(Croatia) Andrej Prskalo	1	–	2	3
TOTALS		22	0	3	25

Source: Competitive matches

=== Disciplinary record ===
Number	Position	Name	1. HNL			Europe			Croatian Cup			Total		
Number	Position	Name	Booked	(yellow card) (yellow-red card)	Sent off (straight red)	Booked	(yellow card) (yellow-red card)	Sent off (straight red)	Booked	(yellow card) (yellow-red card)	Sent off (straight red)	Booked	(yellow card) (yellow-red card)	Sent off (straight red)
6	DF	(North Macedonia) Stefan Ristovski	3	0	0	0	0	0	0	0	0	3	0	0
7	MF	(Croatia) Marin Tomasov	2	0	0	0	0	0	1	0	0	3	0	0
8	MF	(Bosnia and Herzegovina) Zoran Kvržić	1	0	0	1	0	0	0	0	0	2	0	0
8	DF	(North Macedonia) Leonard Zuta	5	0	0	0	0	0	3	0	0	8	0	0
9	FW	(Albania) Bekim Balaj	6	1	0	0	0	0	0	0	0	6	1	0
10	MF	(Romania) Florentin Matei	2	0	0	0	0	0	0	0	0	2	0	0
10	MF	(Croatia) Anas Sharbini	5	0	0	0	0	0	0	0	0	5	0	0
11	FW	(Slovenia) Roman Bezjak	6	0	1	0	0	0	1	0	0	7	0	1
13	DF	(Croatia) Marko Lešković	1	0	1	1	0	0	0	0	0	2	0	1
15	DF	(Croatia) Matej Mitrović	3	0	0	0	0	0	1	0	0	4	0	0
16	MF	(Croatia) Ivan Močinić	9	0	0	0	0	0	0	0	0	9	0	0
17	FW	(Switzerland) Mario Gavranović	2	0	0	0	0	0	0	0	0	2	0	0
18	MF	(Croatia) Filip Bradarić	9	1	0	0	0	0	0	0	0	9	1	0
19	DF	(Slovenia) Miral Samardžić	9	0	0	0	0	0	1	0	0	10	0	0
22	DF	(Croatia) Marin Leovac	3	0	0	1	0	0	0	0	0	4	0	0
23	MF	(Albania) Odise Roshi	1	0	0	0	0	0	0	0	0	1	0	0
25	GK	(Croatia) Ivan Vargić	2	0	0	0	0	0	0	0	0	2	0	0
26	MF	(Croatia) Mate Maleš	11	1	0	0	0	0	0	0	0	11	1	0
29	DF	(Montenegro) Marko Vešović	3	0	0	0	0	0	1	0	0	4	0	0
30	MF	(Croatia) Josip Brezovec	3	0	0	0	0	0	1	0	0	4	0	0
33	MF	(Croatia) Josip Radošević	1	1	0	0	0	0	0	0	0	1	1	0
88	MF	(Brazil) Moisés Lima Magalhães	3	0	1	0	0	0	1	0	0	4	0	1
TOTALS			90	4	3	3	0	0	10	0	0	103	4	3

Source: nk-rijeka.hr

=== Appearances and goals ===
Number	Position	Player	Apps	Goals	Apps	Goals	Apps	Goals	Apps	Goals
Number	Position	Player	Total		1. HNL (Note: First number represents appearances in starting eleven, while the second number indicates a substitute appearance.)		Europa League		Croatian Cup	
1	GK	(Croatia) Simon Sluga	3	0	2+0	0	1+0	0	0+0	0
6	DF	(North Macedonia) Stefan Ristovski	38	0	31+1	0	1+0	0	5+0	0
7	MF	(Croatia) Marin Tomasov	43	14	32+4	8	2+0	1	4+1	5
8	MF	(Bosnia and Herzegovina) Zoran Kvržić	3	1	0+1	0	0+2	1	0+0	0
8	DF	(North Macedonia) Leonard Zuta	30	0	24+2	0	0+0	0	4+0	0
9	FW	(Albania) Bekim Balaj	37	10	20+11	9	1+1	0	2+2	1
10	MF	(Romania) Florentin Matei	15	2	10+3	1	0+0	0	2+0	1
10	MF	(Croatia) Anas Sharbini	14	3	10+2	3	1+0	0	1+0	0
11	FW	(Slovenia) Roman Bezjak	39	17	30+2	13	1+1	0	4+1	4
11	DF	(Croatia) Ivan Tomečak	6	0	4+1	0	1+0	0	0+0	0
13	DF	(Croatia) Marko Lešković	21	1	20+0	1	1+0	0	0+0	0
15	DF	(Croatia) Matej Mitrović	29	1	20+3	1	1+0	0	5+0	0
16	MF	(Croatia) Ivan Močinić	34	0	24+7	0	0+1	0	1+1	0
17	FW	(Switzerland) Mario Gavranović	15	7	13+0	7	0+0	0	2+0	0
18	MF	(Croatia) Filip Bradarić	33	2	20+6	1	2+0	0	3+2	1
19	DF	(Slovenia) Miral Samardžić	37	6	30+0	4	2+0	0	5+0	2
20	FW	(Croatia) Dario Vizinger	2	0	1+1	0	0+0	0	0+0	0
21	DF	(Slovenia) Aleš Mejač	2	0	1+1	0	0+0	0	0+0	0
22	DF	(Croatia) Marin Leovac	7	1	5+0	1	2+0	0	0+0	0
23	MF	(Albania) Odise Roshi	25	2	1+19	1	1+0	0	2+2	1
24	DF	(Croatia) Mateo Bertoša	6	0	3+2	0	0+0	0	1+0	0
25	GK	(Croatia) Ivan Vargić	36	0	32+0	0	1+0	0	3+0	0
26	MF	(Croatia) Mate Maleš	31	1	25+3	1	0+0	0	2+1	0
27	MF	(Croatia) Josip Mišić	1	0	1+0	0	0+0	0	0+0	0
29	DF	(Montenegro) Marko Vešović	22	2	6+12	2	0+0	0	0+4	0
30	MF	(Croatia) Josip Brezovec	13	1	7+5	1	0+0	0	1+0	0
32	GK	(Croatia) Andrej Prskalo	4	0	2+0	0	0+0	0	2+0	0
33	MF	(Croatia) Josip Radošević	20	1	7+9	1	2+0	0	2+0	0
33	DF	(Croatia) Mihael Rebernik	1	0	0+1	0	0+0	0	0+0	0
40	MF	(Nigeria) Gerald Diyoke	1	0	0+1	0	0+0	0	0+0	0
88	MF	(Brazil) Moisés Lima Magalhães	19	2	10+4	1	2+0	0	2+1	1
89	MF	(Croatia) Vedran Jugović	13	0	5+6	0	0+0	0	2+0	0

Source: nk-rijeka.hr

=== Suspensions ===
Date Incurred	Competition	Player	Games Missed	Reason
29 May 2015	1. HNL	(Croatia) Filip Bradarić	1	Booked
29 May 2015	1. HNL	(Croatia) Matej Mitrović	1	Booked
29 May 2015	1. HNL	(Croatia) Josip Radošević	1	Booked
26 Jul 2015	1. HNL	(Croatia) Josip Radošević	1	(yellow card) (yellow-red card)
8 Aug 2015	1. HNL	(Slovenia) Roman Bezjak	2	Sent off (straight red)
8 Aug 2015	1. HNL	(Croatia) Marin Leovac	1	Booked
15 Aug 2015	1. HNL	(Brazil) Moisés	1	Sent off (straight red)
15 Aug 2015	1. HNL	(Croatia) Anas Sharbini	1	Booked
22 Aug 2015	1. HNL	(Croatia) Marko Lešković	1	Sent off (straight red)
30 Aug 2015	1. HNL	(Croatia) Filip Bradarić	1	Booked
30 Aug 2015	1. HNL	(Slovenia) Miral Samardžić	1	Booked
26 Sep 2015	1. HNL	(Croatia) Ivan Močinić	1	Booked
4 Oct 2015	1. HNL	(Croatia) Filip Bradarić	1	(yellow card) (yellow-red card)
25 Oct 2015	1. HNL	(Croatia) Mate Maleš	1	Booked
1 Nov 2015	1. HNL	(Albania) Bekim Balaj	1	Booked
8 Nov 2015	1. HNL	(Brazil) Moisés	1	Booked
21 Nov 2015	1. HNL	(Slovenia) Roman Bezjak	1	Booked
4 Dec 2015	1. HNL	(Montenegro) Marko Vešović	1	Booked
8 Dec 2015	Cup	(North Macedonia) Leonard Zuta	1	Booked
13 Dec 2015	1. HNL	(Croatia) Filip Bradarić	1	Booked
13 Dec 2015	1. HNL	(Croatia) Mate Maleš	1	Booked
18 Dec 2015	1. HNL	(North Macedonia) Stefan Ristovski	1	Booked
12 Feb 2016	1. HNL	(Slovenia) Miral Samardžić	1	Booked
27 Feb 2016	1. HNL	(Croatia) Mate Maleš	1	(yellow card) (yellow-red card)
27 Feb 2016	1. HNL	(Croatia) Ivan Močinić	1	Booked
2 Mar 2016	1. HNL	(North Macedonia) Leonard Zuta	1	Booked
2 Mar 2016	1. HNL	(Albania) Bekim Balaj	1	(yellow card) (yellow-red card)
19 Mar 2016	1. HNL	(Croatia) Matej Mitrović	1	Booked
9 Apr 2016	1. HNL	(Slovenia) Roman Bezjak	1	Booked
9 Apr 2016	1. HNL	(Croatia) Mate Maleš	1	Booked
16 Apr 2016	1. HNL	(Croatia) Josip Brezovec	1	Booked
24 Apr 2016	1. HNL	(Albania) Bekim Balaj	1	Booked
1 May 2016	1. HNL	(Slovenia) Miral Samardžić	1	Booked
7 May 2016	1. HNL	(Croatia) Ivan Močinić	1	Booked
7 May 2016	1. HNL	(Croatia) Filip Bradarić	1	Booked

=== Penalties ===
For
Date	Competition	Player	Opposition	Scored?
10 Jul 2015	1. HNL	(Croatia) Marko Lešković	Inter Zaprešić	✗
19 Jul 2015	1. HNL	(Brazil) Moisés	Slaven Belupo	✗
19 Sep 2015	1. HNL	(Croatia) Filip Bradarić	Inter Zaprešić	✗
8 Nov 2015	1. HNL	(Croatia) Marin Tomasov	RNK Split	✗
Against
Date	Competition	Goalkeeper	Opposition	Scored?
19 Jul 2015	1. HNL	(Croatia) Ivan Vargić	Slaven Belupo	✓
8 Nov 2015	1. HNL	(Croatia) Ivan Vargić	RNK Split	✓
21 Nov 2015	1. HNL	(Croatia) Ivan Vargić	Osijek	✓
2 Mar 2016	1. HNL	(Croatia) Ivan Vargić	RNK Split	✗
6 Mar 2016	1. HNL	(Croatia) Ivan Vargić	Osijek	✓
16 Apr 2016	1. HNL	(Croatia) Ivan Vargić	Lokomotiva	✗

=== Overview of statistics ===
Statistic	Overall	Prva HNL	Croatian Cup	Europa League
Most appearances	Tomasov (43)	Tomasov (36)	6 players (5)	8 players (2)
Most starts	Tomasov (38)	Tomasov & Vargić (32)	Mitrović, Ristovski & Samardžić (5)	6 players (2)
Most substitute appearances	Roshi (21)	Roshi (19)	Vešović (4)	Kvržić (2)
Most minutes played	Samardžić (3,330)	Vargić (2,880)	Mitrović & Samardžić (450)	Leovac, Moisés & Samardžić (180)
Top goalscorer	Bezjak (17)	Bezjak (13)	Tomasov (5)	Kvržić & Tomasov (1)
Most assists	Tomasov (15)	Tomasov (12)	Tomasov & Zuta (3)	Kvržić & Radošević (1)
Most yellow cards	Maleš (11)	Maleš (11)	Zuta (3)	Kvržić, Leovac & Lešković (1)
Most red cards	7 players (1)	7 players (1)	–	–
Last updated: 14 May 2016.

== Transfers ==
=== In ===
Date	Pos.	Player	Moving from	Type	Fee
19 Jun 2015	CF	(Slovenia) Roman Bezjak	(Bulgaria) Ludogorets	Transfer	Free
19 Jun 2015	GK	(Croatia) Simon Sluga	(Croatia) Lokomotiva	Return from loan	—N/a
3 Jul 2015	GK	(Croatia) Ivan Nevistić	(Croatia) Osijek	Transfer	€50,000
3 Jul 2015	CF	(Croatia) Dario Vizinger	(Croatia) Varaždin	Transfer	€50,000
6 Jul 2015	RW	(Bosnia and Herzegovina) Zoran Kvržić	(Italy) Spezia	Return from loan	—N/a
6 Jul 2015	RW	(Albania) Odise Roshi	(Germany) FSV Frankfurt	Transfer	Free
7 Jul 2015	RB	(North Macedonia) Stefan Ristovski	(Italy) Spezia	Loan (until 30/6/2016)	—N/a
17 Jul 2015	CF	(Italy) Juri Cisotti	(Italy) Spezia	Loan (until 30/6/2016)	—N/a
20 Jul 2015	CB	(Croatia) Frane Ikić	(Croatia) Zadar	Transfer	€65,000
11 Aug 2015	RB	(Montenegro) Marko Vešović	(Italy) Spezia	Loan (until 30/6/2016)	—N/a
4 Sep 2015	LB	(North Macedonia) Leonard Zuta	(Sweden) Häcken	Transfer	€50,000
22 Jan 2016	CM	(Croatia) Josip Brezovec	(Italy) Spezia	Return from loan	—N/a
22 Jan 2016	CM	(Montenegro) Asmir Kajević	(Switzerland) Zürich	Transfer	Free
22 Jan 2016	RW	(Croatia) Tomislav Turčin	(Croatia) Cibalia	Transfer	€60,000
29 Jan 2016	LB	(Nigeria) Jamilu Collins	(Slovenia) Krka	Return from loan	—N/a
5 Feb 2016	GK	(Croatia) Ivan Vargić	(Italy) Lazio	Loan (until 30/6/2016)	—N/a
9 Feb 2016	CF	(Switzerland) Mario Gavranović	(Switzerland) Zürich	Transfer	€600,000
9 Feb 2016	AM	(Romania) Florentin Matei	(Ukraine) Volyn Lutsk	Transfer	€500,000
9 Feb 2016	RB	(Slovenia) Aleš Mejač	(Slovenia) Maribor	Loan (until 31/5/2016)	—N/a

Source: Glasilo Hrvatskog nogometnog saveza

=== Out ===
Date	Pos.	Player	Moving to	Type	Fee
23 Jun 2015	CF	(Croatia) Josip Ivančić	(Slovenia) Koper	Loan (until 15/6/2016)	—N/a
24 Jun 2015	DM	(Croatia) Domagoj Pušić	(Switzerland) Lugano	Transfer	Free
1 Jul 2015	CM	(Spain) Álex Fernández	(Spain) Espanyol	End of loan	—N/a
6 Jul 2015	RB	(Montenegro) Marko Vešović	(Italy) Torino	End of loan	—N/a
9 Jul 2015	LB	(Nigeria) Jamilu Collins	(Slovenia) Krka	Loan (until 14/6/2016)	—N/a
9 Jul 2015	CF	(Bulgaria) Ventsislav Hristov	(Albania) Skënderbeu Korçë	Loan (until 30/6/2016)	—N/a
9 Jul 2015	GK	(Nigeria) David Nwolokor	(Croatia) Šibenik	Loan (until 14/6/2016)	—N/a
9 Jul 2015	CF	(Nigeria) Solomon Theophilus	(Croatia) Šibenik	Loan (until 14/6/2016)	—N/a
14 Jul 2015	CF	(Croatia) Filip Dangubić	(Slovenia) Krka	Loan (until 14/6/2016)	—N/a
16 Jul 2015	AM	(Nigeria) Aliyu Okechukwu	(Croatia) Šibenik	Loan (until 14/6/2016)	—N/a
19 Jul 2015	CB	(Bosnia and Herzegovina) Jozo Špikić	(Bosnia and Herzegovina) Široki Brijeg	Loan (until 15/6/2016)	—N/a
19 Jul 2015	CM	(Bosnia and Herzegovina) Damir Zlomislić	(Croatia) Istra 1961	Loan (until 15/6/2016)	—N/a
22 Jul 2015	CB	(Croatia) Niko Datković	(Switzerland) Lugano	Loan (until 30/6/2016)	—N/a
23 Jul 2015	AM	(Croatia) Antonini Čulina	(Switzerland) Lugano	Transfer	Undisclosed
30 Jul 2015	LW	(Nigeria) Goodness Ajayi	(Bosnia and Herzegovina) Široki Brijeg	Loan (until 15/6/2016)	—N/a
3 Aug 2015	CF	(Croatia) Andrija Filipović	(Italy) Spezia	Loan (until 30/6/2016)	—N/a
3 Aug 2015	RB	(Croatia) Mato Miloš	(Italy) Spezia	Loan (until 30/6/2016)	—N/a
5 Aug 2015	RW	(Bosnia and Herzegovina) Zoran Kvržić	(Italy) Spezia	Loan (until 30/6/2016)	—N/a
12 Aug 2015	GK	(Croatia) Simon Sluga	(Italy) Spezia	Loan (until 30/6/2016)	—N/a
17 Aug 2015	LB	(Croatia) Marin Leovac	(Greece) PAOK	Transfer	€1.7 million
23 Aug 2015	CM	(Croatia) Josip Mišić	(Italy) Spezia	Loan (until 30/6/2016)	—N/a
31 Aug 2015	RB	(Croatia) Ivan Tomečak	(Ukraine) Dnipro	Transfer	€1 million
21 Sep 2015	CB	(Croatia) Dario Knežević	—N/a	Retirement	—N/a
12 Oct 2015	CM	(Slovenia) Goran Cvijanović	(Slovenia) Gorica	Transfer	Free
19 Nov 2015	RW	(Croatia) Drago Gabrić	(Slovenia) Koper	Transfer	Free
13 Jan 2016	CF	(Italy) Juri Cisotti	(Italy) Spezia	End of loan	—N/a
15 Jan 2016	AM	(Croatia) Mislav Oršić	(South Korea) Jeonnam Dragons	Transfer	$1 million
18 Jan 2016	RB	(Croatia) Mato Miloš	(Italy) Perugia	Loan (until 30/6/2016)	—N/a
21 Jan 2016	DM	(Croatia) Josip Radošević	(Italy) Napoli	End of loan	—N/a
30 Jan 2016	LB	(Nigeria) Muhammed Kabiru	(Slovenia) Krka	Loan (until 15/6/2016)	—N/a
1 Feb 2016	GK	(Croatia) Ivan Vargić	(Italy) Lazio	Transfer	€2.559 million
3 Feb 2016	CF	(Bulgaria) Ventsislav Hristov	(Bulgaria) Levski Sofia	Transfer	€80,000
7 Feb 2016	CM	(Brazil) Moisés	(Brazil) Palmeiras	Transfer	€1 million
11 Feb 2016	RW	(Croatia) Tomislav Turčin	(Croatia) Cibalia	Loan (until 15/6/2016)	—N/a
15 Feb 2016	LB	(Nigeria) Jamilu Collins	(Croatia) Šibenik	Loan (until 14/6/2016)	—N/a
15 Feb 2016	RM	(Croatia) Vedran Jugović	(South Korea) Jeonnam Dragons	Loan (until 31/12/2016; option to buy)	—N/a
15 Feb 2016	LW	(Croatia) Anas Sharbini	(Turkey) Osmanlıspor	Loan (until 15/6/2016; option to buy)	€100,000
19 Feb 2016	CF	(Croatia) Josip Ivančić	(Moldova) Sheriff Tiraspol	Transfer	€100,000

Source: Glasilo Hrvatskog nogometnog saveza

Spending: ▼€1,375,000
Income: ▲€7,414,000
Expenditure: ▲€6,039,000
