= Brdar =

Brdar is a surname. Notable people with the surname include:

- Jakov Brdar (born 1949), Slovene-Bosnian sculptor
- Michael Brdar (born 1994), American baseball coach
- Robert Brdar (born 1995), Croatian footballer
