= List of Croatian records in Olympic weightlifting =

List of Croatian's olympic records in weightlifting

The following are the national records in Olympic weightlifting in Croatia. Records are maintained in each weight class for the snatch lift, clean and jerk lift, and the total for both lifts by the Croatian Weightlifting Federation (Hrvatski dizački savez).

== Current records ==
Key to tables: Awaiting ratification Not ratified or later rescinded by Croatian Weightlifting Federation

=== Men ===
Event	Record	Athlete	Date	Meet	Place	Ref
60 kg
Snatch	105 kg	Standard				
Clean & Jerk	120 kg	Standard				
Total	225 kg	Standard				
65 kg
Snatch	112 kg	Standard				
Clean & Jerk	135 kg	Standard				
Total	247 kg	Standard				
71 kg
Snatch	120 kg	Standard				
Clean & Jerk	145 kg	Standard				
Total	265 kg	Standard				
79 kg
Snatch	130 kg	Standard				
Clean & Jerk	155 kg	Standard				
Clean & Jerk	160 kg	Nikola Todorović	22 April 2026	European Championships	Batumi, Georgia	
Total	285 kg	Standard				
Total	289 kg	Nikola Todorović	22 April 2026	European Championships	Batumi, Georgia	
88 kg
Snatch	140 kg	Standard				
Clean & Jerk	175 kg	Standard				
Total	315 kg	Standard				
94 kg
Snatch	145 kg	Standard				
Clean & Jerk	177 kg	Standard				
Total	321 kg	Standard				
110 kg
Snatch	150 kg	Standard				
Clean & Jerk	190 kg	Standard				
Total	340 kg	Standard				
+110 kg
Snatch	160 kg	Standard				
Clean & Jerk	200 kg	Standard				
Total	360 kg	Standard				

=== Women ===
Event	Record	Athlete	Date	Meet	Place	Ref
48 kg
Snatch	62 kg	Standard				
Clean & Jerk	83 kg	Standard				
Total	145 kg	Standard				
53 kg
Snatch	67 kg	Standard				
Clean & Jerk	85 kg	Standard				
Total	152 kg	Standard				
58 kg
Snatch	75 kg	Standard				
Clean & Jerk	92 kg	Standard				
Total	167 kg	Standard				
63 kg
Snatch	77 kg	Standard				
Clean & Jerk	96 kg	Standard				
Total	171 kg	Standard				
69 kg
Snatch	85 kg	Standard				
Clean & Jerk	105 kg	Standard				
Total	190 kg	Standard				
77 kg
Snatch	92 kg	Standard				
Clean & Jerk	110 kg	Standard				
Total	202 kg	Standard				
86 kg
Snatch	97 kg	Standard				
Clean & Jerk	117 kg	Standard				
Total	214 kg	Standard				
+86 kg
Snatch	102 kg	Standard				
Clean & Jerk	125 kg	Standard				
Total	227 kg	Standard				

== Historical records ==
=== Men (2018–2025) ===
Event	Record	Athlete	Date	Meet	Place	Ref
55 kg
Snatch	80 kg	Standard				
Clean & Jerk	100 kg	Standard				
Total	180 kg	Standard				
61 kg
Snatch	105 kg	Standard				
Clean & Jerk	130 kg	Standard				
Total	235 kg	Standard				
67 kg
Snatch	115 kg	Standard				
Clean & Jerk	135 kg	Standard				
Total	245 kg	Standard				
73 kg
Snatch	125 kg	Standard				
Clean & Jerk	147 kg	Ivan Novko	24 November 2024		Split, Croatia	
Total	270 kg	Standard				
81 kg
Snatch	135 kg	Amar Musić	4 November 2018	World Championships	Ashgabat, Turkmenistan	
Clean & Jerk	160 kg	Standard				
Total	290 kg	Standard				
89 kg
Snatch	145 kg	Amar Musić	19 May 2019	Croatian Championships	Zagreb, Croatia	
Clean & Jerk	180 kg	Amar Musić	19 May 2019	Croatian Championships	Zagreb, Croatia	
Total	325 kg	Amar Musić	19 May 2019	Croatian Championships	Zagreb, Croatia	
96 kg
Snatch	145 kg	Amar Musić	24 September 2022		Split, Croatia	
Clean & Jerk	176 kg	Amar Musić	24 September 2022		Split, Croatia	
Total	321 kg	Amar Musić	24 September 2022		Split, Croatia	
102 kg
Snatch	145 kg	Standard				
Clean & Jerk	175 kg	Standard				
Total	320 kg	Standard				
109 kg
Snatch	151 kg	Dino Đale	30 September 2023		Split, Croatia	
Clean & Jerk	190 kg	Standard				
Total	340 kg	Standard				
+109 kg
Snatch	161 kg	Ante Vuković	23 November 2019	Ivan Helman Cup	Zagreb, Croatia	
Clean & Jerk	200 kg	Standard				
Total	360 kg	Standard				

=== Men (1998–2018) ===
Event	Record	Athlete	Date	Meet	Place	Ref
-56 kg
Snatch	83 kg	Ensar Musić	25 February 2006		Rijeka, Croatia	
Clean & Jerk	105 kg	Ensar Musić	25 February 2006		Rijeka, Croatia	
Total	188 kg	Ensar Musić	25 February 2006		Rijeka, Croatia	
-62 kg
Snatch	150 kg	Nikolaj Pešalov	17 September 2000	Olympic Games	Sydney, Australia	
Clean & Jerk	177.5 kg	Nikolaj Pešalov	26 April 2000	European Championships	Sofia, Bulgaria	
Total	325 kg	Nikolaj Pešalov	26 April 2000	European Championships	Sofia, Bulgaria	
-69 kg
Snatch	150 kg	Nikolaj Pešalov	18 August 2004	Olympic Games	Athens, Greece	
Clean & Jerk	187.5 kg	Nikolaj Pešalov	18 August 2004	Olympic Games	Athens, Greece	
Total	337.5 kg	Nikolaj Pešalov	18 August 2004	Olympic Games	Athens, Greece	
-77 kg
Snatch	148 kg	Amar Musić	13 June 2007	World Junior Championships	Prague, Czech Republic	
Clean & Jerk	186 kg	Ensar Musić	17 June 2010	World Junior Championships	Sofia, Bulgaria	
Total	328 kg	Amar Musić	13 June 2007	World Junior Championships	Prague, Czech Republic	
-85 kg
Snatch	160 kg	Musić	27 September 2008		Split, Croatia	
Clean & Jerk	200 kg	Yoto Yotov	26 March 2011		Rijeka, Croatia	
Total	353 kg	Musić	26 March 2011		Rijeka, Croatia	
-94 kg
Snatch						
Clean & Jerk						
Total						
-105 kg
Snatch						
Clean & Jerk	212 kg	Ante Vuković	3 March 2012	Croatian League	Split, Croatia	
Total	385 kg	Ante Vuković	3 March 2012	Croatian League	Split, Croatia	
+105 kg
Snatch	180 kg	Ante Vuković	20 October 2012	Croatian Cup	Osijek, Croatia	
Clean & Jerk	215 kg	Ante Vuković	20 October 2012	Croatian Cup	Osijek, Croatia	
Total	395 kg	Ante Vuković	20 October 2012	Croatian Cup	Osijek, Croatia	

=== Women (2018–2025) ===
Event	Record	Athlete	Date	Meet	Place	Ref
45 kg
Snatch	60 kg	Tihana Majer	18 September 2019	World Championships	Pattaya, Thailand	
Clean & Jerk	81 kg	Tihana Majer	3 April 2021	European Championships	Moscow, Russia	
Total	136 kg	Tihana Majer	18 September 2019	World Championships	Pattaya, Thailand	
49 kg
Snatch	62 kg	Tihana Majer	26 June 2022		Split, Croatia	
Clean & Jerk	80 kg	Tihana Majer	24 April 2022		Zagreb, Croatia	
Total	140 kg	Tihana Majer	24 April 2022		Zagreb, Croatia	
55 kg
Snatch	68 kg	Marina Marković	15 November 2020		Osijek, Croatia	
Clean & Jerk	85 kg	Marina Marković	29 February 2020		Malta	
Total	151 kg	Marina Marković	29 February 2020		Malta	
59 kg
Snatch	78 kg	Ivana Gorišek	21 May 2023		Zagreb, Croatia	
Clean & Jerk	92 kg	Chiara Reljac	12 March 2023		Vukovar, Croatia	
Total	168 kg	Ivana Gorišek	14 April 2024		Osijek, Croatia	
64 kg
Snatch	77 kg	Ivana Gorišek	10 December 2022	World Championships	Bogotá, Colombia	
Snatch	78 kg	Ivana Gorišek	18 April 2023	European Championships	Yerevan, Armenia	
Clean & Jerk	94 kg	Barbara Maljković	3 December 2023		Osijek, Croatia	
Total	170 kg	Ivana Gorišek	10 December 2022	World Championships	Bogotá, Colombia	
71 kg
Snatch	81 kg	Ivona Gavran	21 May 2023		Zagreb, Croatia	
Clean & Jerk	98 kg	Natalia Biberica	16 July 2021		Dražice, Croatia	
Total	174 kg	Ivona Gavran	9 November 2022		Pécs, Hungary	
76 kg
Snatch	95 kg	Ivona Gavran	3 December 2023		Osijek, Croatia	
Clean & Jerk	116 kg	Ivona Gavran	24 November 2024		Split, Croatia	
Total	206 kg	Ivona Gavran	24 November 2024		Split, Croatia	
81 kg
Snatch	82 kg	Standard				
Clean & Jerk	100 kg	Natalia Biberica	29 September 2021	European U23 Championships	Rovaniemi, Finland	
Total	179 kg	Standard				
87 kg
Snatch	85 kg	Standard				
Clean & Jerk	100 kg	Standard				
Total	185 kg	Standard				
+87 kg
Snatch	90 kg	Standard				
Clean & Jerk	111 kg	Mirjam Dragičević	3 August 2023	European U23 Championships	Bucharest, Romania	
Total	195 kg	Standard				

=== Women (1998–2018) ===
Event	Record	Athlete	Date	Meet	Place	Ref
48 kg
Snatch	64 kg	Tihana Majer	27 March 2018	European Championships	Bucharest, Romania	
Clean & Jerk	76 kg	Tihana Majer	14 April 2018		San Marino	
Total	139 kg	Tihana Majer	27 March 2018	European Championships	Bucharest, Romania	
53 kg
Snatch	66 kg	Tina Erceg	9 December 2017	Croatian Cup	Split, Croatia	
Clean & Jerk	81 kg	Milijana Vojinović	11 April 2015	European Championships	Tbilisi, Georgia	
Total	144 kg	Tina Erceg	13 May 2016		Osijek, Croatia	
58 kg
Snatch	76 kg	Tea Šojat	12 April 2016	European Championships	Førde, Norway	
Clean & Jerk	91 kg	Tea Šojat	12 April 2016	European Championships	Førde, Norway	
Total	167 kg	Tea Šojat	12 April 2016	European Championships	Førde, Norway	
63 kg
Snatch	84 kg	Tea Šojat	29 March 2018	European Championships	Bucharest, Romania	
Clean & Jerk	101 kg	Tea Šojat	29 March 2018	European Championships	Bucharest, Romania	
Total	185 kg	Tea Šojat	29 March 2018	European Championships	Bucharest, Romania	
69 kg
Snatch	83 kg	Mihaela Kruljac	30 October 2015		Dražice, Croatia	
Clean & Jerk	103 kg	Mihaela Kruljac	30 October 2015		Dražice, Croatia	
Total	186 kg	Mihaela Kruljac	30 October 2015		Dražice, Croatia	
75 kg
Snatch	87 kg	Mihaela Kruljac	12 December 2015		Split, Croatia	
Clean & Jerk	107 kg	Mihaela Kruljac	4 November 2016		Split, Croatia	
Total	193 kg	Mihaela Kruljac	12 December 2015		Split, Croatia	
90 kg
Snatch	88 kg	Mihaela Kruljac	10 December 2016		Split, Croatia	
Clean & Jerk	112 kg	Mihaela Kruljac	10 December 2016		Split, Croatia	
Total	200 kg	Mihaela Kruljac	10 December 2016		Split, Croatia	
+90 kg
Snatch	66 kg	Ana Crnjac	3 June 2018		Dražice, Croatia	
Clean & Jerk	82 kg	Ana Crnjac	3 June 2018		Dražice, Croatia	
Total	148 kg	Ana Crnjac	3 June 2018		Dražice, Croatia	
