= Church of St. Nicholas, Rijeka =

Serbian Orthodox church in Rijeka, Croatia

Coordinates: 45°19′33″N 14°26′34″E

Saint Nicholas Church
- Crkva svetog Nikole; Црква светог Николе
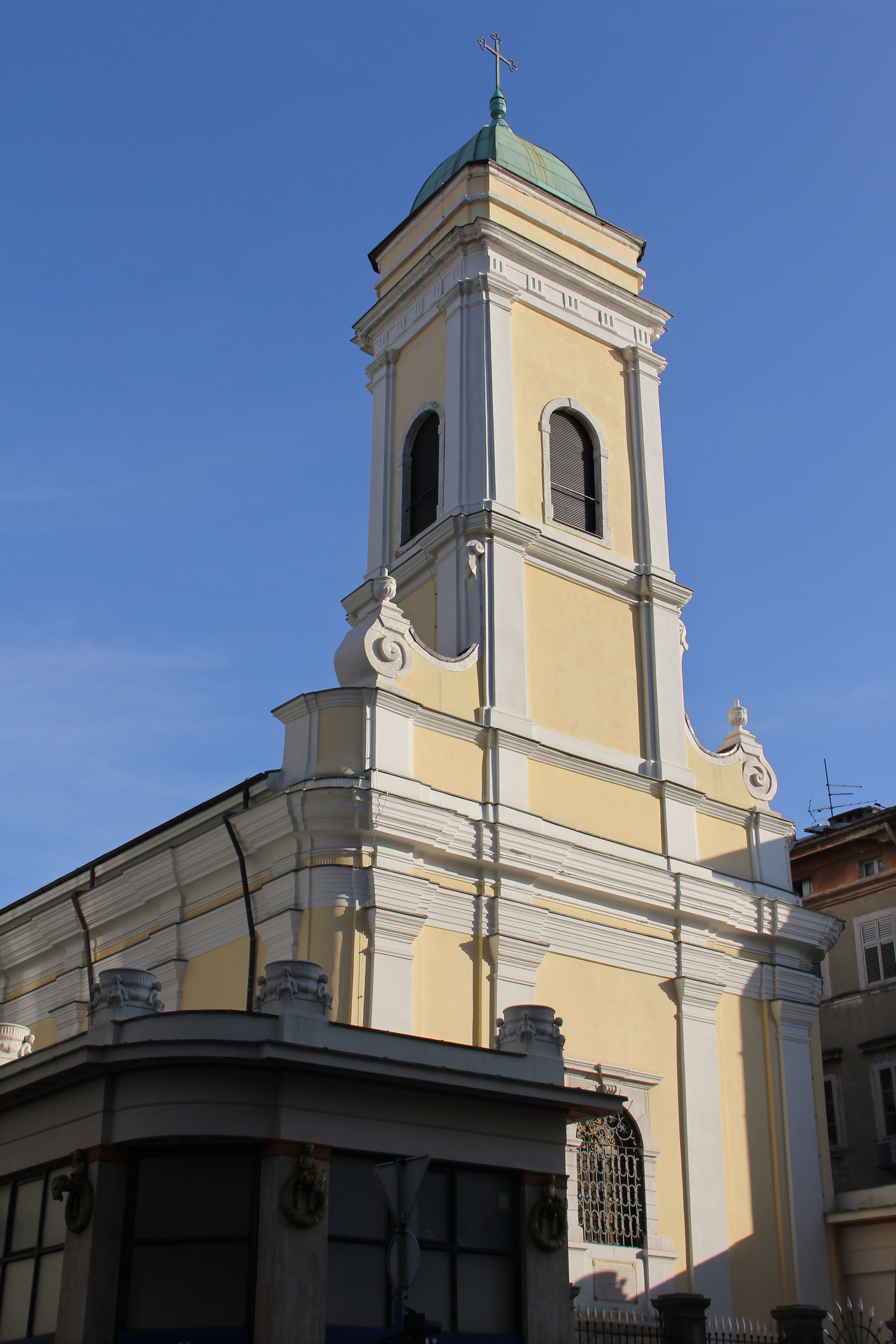
- Saint Nicholas Church
- Saint Nicholas Church
- Location: Rijeka
- Country: Croatia
- Denomination: Serbian Orthodox

History
- Founded: 1790
- Dedication: Saint Nicholas

Architecture
- Style: Classical

Administration
- Archdiocese: Eparchy of Upper Karlovac

The Church of St. Nicholas (Serbo-Croatian: Crkva svetog Nikole / Црква светог Николе) is a Serbian Orthodox church in Rijeka, Croatia. The church is dedicated to Saint Nicholas. The building of the church was completed in 1790.

== History ==
The church was designed by local architect Ignazio Hencke in 1787 year and was built in 1790 using money of Orthodox Serbs who fled the Ottoman Empire and settled in Fiume (Rijeka) city in 1768. At the same time urban local authorities hindered the construction. The church kept numerous icons from monasteries in Bosnia and Vojvodina.

Rijeka has a notable Serb minority (6.57% in 2011, 11,24% in 1991), while the Serb-inhabited villages of Milaši and Moravice (Gorski kotar) historically gravitated towards Rijeka.

== Gallery ==
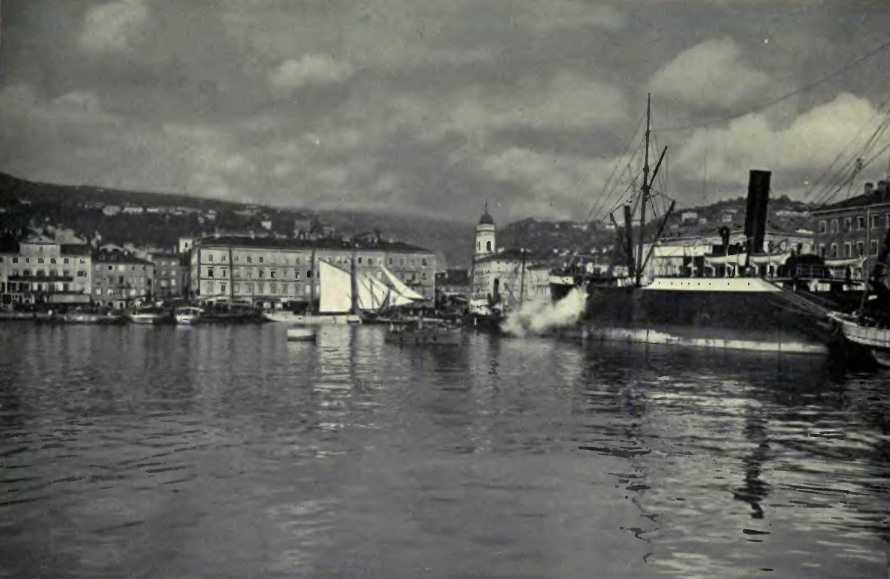
Fiume port in 1923. The Saint Nicolas Church in the center.

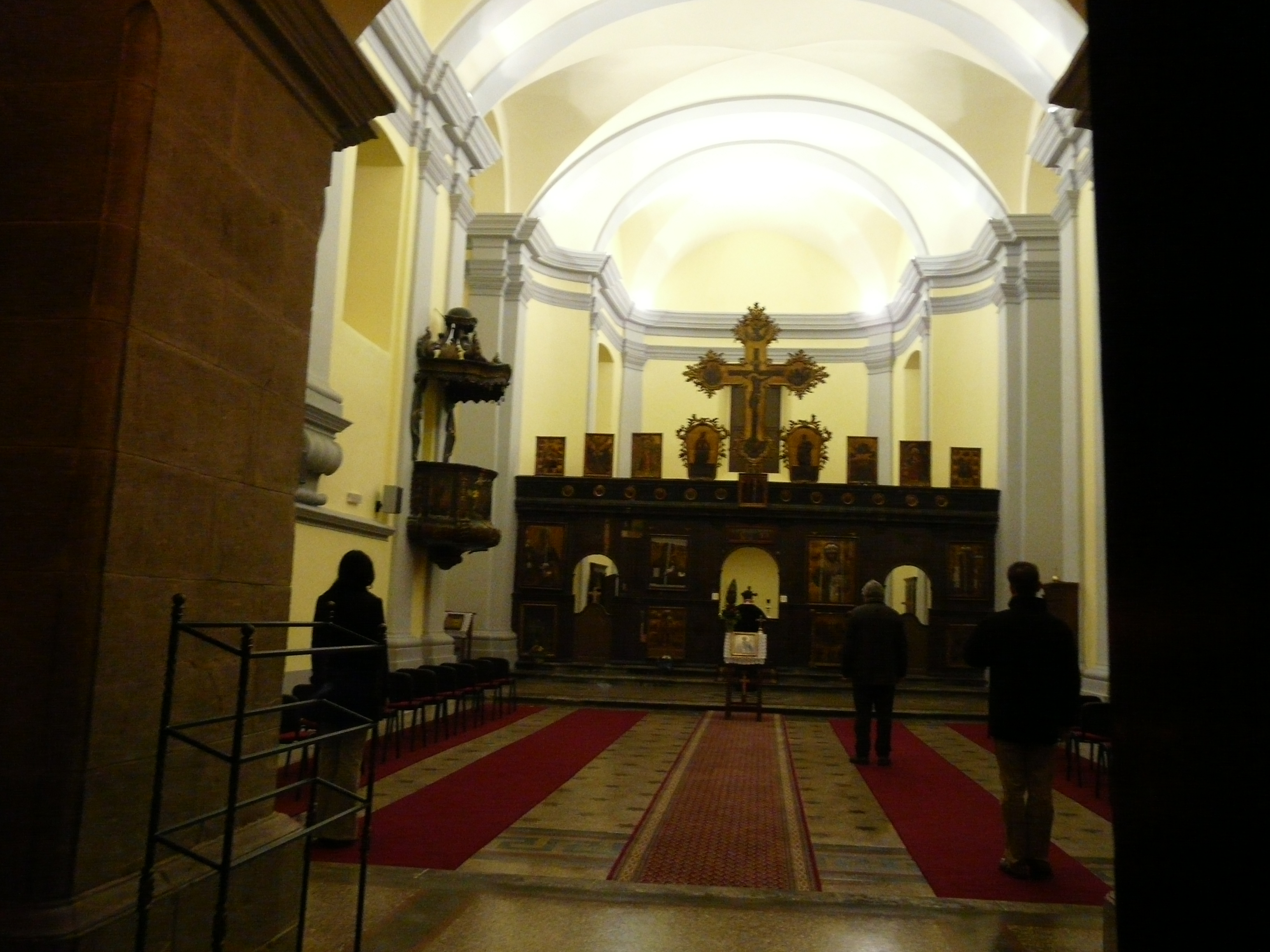
Inside the Church.

== See also ==
- Eparchy of Upper Karlovac
- Rijeka
- Serbs of Croatia
- List of Serbian Orthodox churches in Croatia
