= Valići =

Settlement in Primorje-Gorski Kotar County, Croatia

- Settlement
- Interactive map of Valići
- Location of Valići in Croatia
- Coordinates: 45°22′27″N 14°26′27″E
- Country: Croatia
- County: Primorje-Gorski Kotar
- Municipality: Jelenje

Area
  - Total: 0.2 km^{2} (0.077 sq mi)

Population (2021)
  - Total: 0
  - Density: 0.0/km^{2} (0.0/sq mi)
- Time zone: UTC+1 (CET)
  - Summer (DST): UTC+2 (CEST)
- Postal code: 51219 Čavle

Valići is a settlement in the Municipality of Jelenje in Croatia. In 2021, its population was 0.

== Demographics ==
Valići: Population trends 1857–2021
v

population	75	89	93	96	90	77	81	103	100	96	88	18	6	6	3	1
	1857	1869	1880	1890	1900	1910	1921	1931	1948	1953	1961	1971	1981	1991	2001	2011	2021

Sources: Croatian Bureau of Statistics publications
