= Lubarska =

Settlement in Primorje-Gorski Kotar County, Croatia

- Settlement
- Interactive map of Lubarska
- Location of Lubarska in Croatia
- Coordinates: 45°23′17″N 14°26′33″E
- Country: Croatia
- County: Primorje-Gorski Kotar
- Municipality: Jelenje

Area
  - Total: 0.2 km^{2} (0.077 sq mi)

Population (2021)
  - Total: 93
  - Density: 470/km^{2} (1,200/sq mi)
- Time zone: UTC+1 (CET)
  - Summer (DST): UTC+2 (CEST)
- Postal code: 51219 Čavle

Lubarska is a settlement in the Municipality of Jelenje in Croatia. In 2021, its population was 93.

== Demographics ==
Lubarska: Population trends 1857–2021
v

population	108	112	85	99	99	105	90	115	137	119	125	119	100	105	85	114	93
	1857	1869	1880	1890	1900	1910	1921	1931	1948	1953	1961	1971	1981	1991	2001	2011	2021

Sources: Croatian Bureau of Statistics publications
