= Kukuljani =

- Location of Kukuljani in Croatia
- Coordinates: 45°24′12″N 14°25′02″E
- Country: Croatia
- County: Primorje-Gorski Kotar County
- Municipality: Jelenje

Area
  - Total: 3.3 km^{2} (1.3 sq mi)
- Elevation: 300 m (980 ft)

Population (2021)
  - Total: 90
  - Density: 27/km^{2} (71/sq mi)
- Time zone: UTC+1 (CET)
  - Summer (DST): UTC+2 (CEST)
- Postal code: 51218

Kukuljani (Italian: Cucugliani) is a village in the Primorje-Gorski Kotar County, Croatia. Administratively it belongs to the municipality of Jelenje.

== Population ==
Population number according to the census
1880	1890	1900	1910	1948	1953	1961	1971	1981	1991	2001	2011
233	228	255	255	116	127	122	119	101	81	82	87
