= Zoretići =

Settlement in Primorje-Gorski Kotar County, Croatia

- Settlement
- Interactive map of Zoretići
- Location of Zoretići in Croatia
- Coordinates: 45°23′51″N 14°25′27″E
- Country: Croatia
- County: Primorje-Gorski Kotar
- Municipality: Jelenje

Area
  - Total: 2.6 km^{2} (1.0 sq mi)

Population (2021)
  - Total: 93
  - Density: 36/km^{2} (93/sq mi)
- Time zone: UTC+1 (CET)
  - Summer (DST): UTC+2 (CEST)
- Postal code: 51219 Čavle

Zoretići is a settlement in the Municipality of Jelenje in Croatia. In 2021, its population was 93.

== Demographics ==
Zoretići: Population trends 1857–2021
v

population	173	162	195	213	199	198	177	204	125	156	163	171	143	116	98	92	93
	1857	1869	1880	1890	1900	1910	1921	1931	1948	1953	1961	1971	1981	1991	2001	2011	2021

Sources: Croatian Bureau of Statistics publications
