= Podkilavac =

Village in Primorje-Gorski Kotar, Croatia

- Village
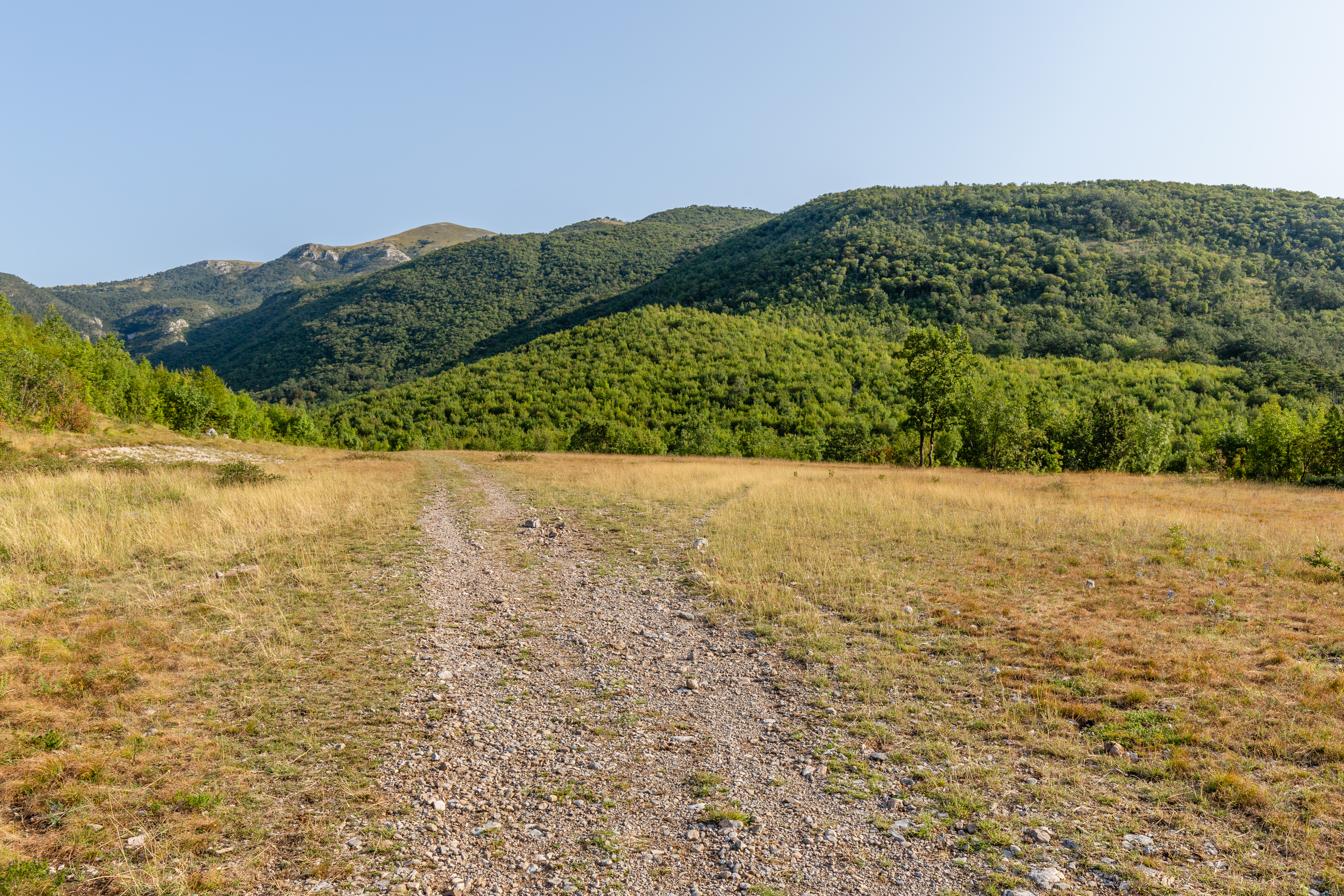
- Landscape near Podkilavac

- Location within Croatia
- Coordinates: 45.39839°N 14.46107°E
- Country: Croatia
- County: Primorje-Gorski Kotar
- Municipality: Jelenje

Area
  - Total: 41.6 km^{2} (16.1 sq mi)

Population (2021)
  - Total: 328
  - Density: 7.88/km^{2} (20.4/sq mi)
- Time zone: UTC+1 (CET)
  - Summer (DST): UTC+2 (CEST)
- Postal code: 51218
- Area code: 051
- Vehicle registration: RI

Podkilavac is a village in Primorje-Gorski Kotar, Croatia, just to the north of Dražice and approximately 8 km to the north of Rijeka. Administratively, it is part of the municipality of Jelenje. As of 2021, it had a population of 328.
