= Lukeži =

Settlement in Primorje-Gorski Kotar County, Croatia

- Settlement
- Interactive map of Lukeži
- Location of Lukeži in Croatia
- Coordinates: 45°22′47″N 14°27′05″E
- Country: Croatia
- County: Primorje-Gorski Kotar
- Municipality: Jelenje

Area
  - Total: 0.3 km^{2} (0.12 sq mi)

Population (2021)
  - Total: 148
  - Density: 490/km^{2} (1,300/sq mi)
- Time zone: UTC+1 (CET)
  - Summer (DST): UTC+2 (CEST)
- Postal code: 51219 Čavle

Lukeži is a settlement in the Municipality of Jelenje in Croatia. In 2021, its population was 148.

== Demographics ==
Lukeži: Population trends 1857–2021
v

| population | 270 | 195 | 214 | 257 | 289 | 299 | 267 | 306 | 276 | 266 | 276 | 269 | 241 | 204 | 181 | 193 | 148 |
| | 1857 | 1869 | 1880 | 1890 | 1900 | 1910 | 1921 | 1931 | 1948 | 1953 | 1961 | 1971 | 1981 | 1991 | 2001 | 2011 | 2021 |

Sources: Croatian Bureau of Statistics publications
