= Brnelići =

Settlement in Primorje-Gorski Kotar County, Croatia

- Settlement
- Interactive map of Brnelići
- Location of Brnelići in Croatia
- Coordinates: 45°23′41″N 14°26′08″E
- Country: Croatia
- County: Primorje-Gorski Kotar
- Municipality: Jelenje

Area
  - Total: 0.6 km^{2} (0.23 sq mi)

Population (2021)
  - Total: 78
  - Density: 130/km^{2} (340/sq mi)
- Time zone: UTC+1 (CET)
  - Summer (DST): UTC+2 (CEST)
- Postal code: 51219 Čavle

Brnelići is a settlement in the Municipality of Jelenje in Croatia. In 2021, its population was 78.

== Demographics ==
Brnelići: Population trends 1857–2021
v

population	160	145	139	150	173	174	179	226	78	91	110	103	74	62	83	85	78
	1857	1869	1880	1890	1900	1910	1921	1931	1948	1953	1961	1971	1981	1991	2001	2011	2021

Sources: Croatian Bureau of Statistics publications
