= Ivan Močinić =

Croatian footballer

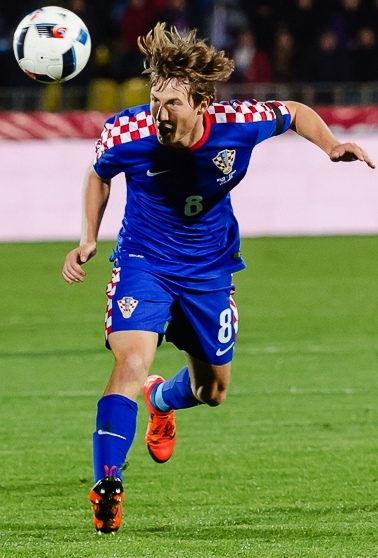
- Močinić with Croatia in 2015

Personal information
- Date of birth: 30 April 1993 (age 33)
- Place of birth: Rijeka, Croatia
- Height: 1.80 m (5 ft 11 in)
- Position: Midfielder

Youth career
- 2004–2008: Rijeka
- 2008–2009: Lokomotiva Rijeka
- 2009–2011: Rijeka

Senior career*
Years	Team	Apps	(Gls)
2011–2016	Rijeka	112	(4)
2016–2019	Rapid Wien	14	(0)
2017–2019	→ Rapid Wien II	11	(1)
2019–2020	Istra 1961	19	(1)
2020–2021	Olimpija Ljubljana	6	(0)
2021–2022	Šibenik	1	(0)

International career
2015	Croatia	1	(0)
- * Club domestic league appearances and goals as of 11 May 2021

Ivan Močinić (born 30 April 1993) is a Croatian retired footballer who played as a midfielder. He spent vast majority of his career with Croatian First Football League side Rijeka.

== Club career ==
=== Rijeka ===
Močinić made his début for Rijeka in an away match against Dinamo Zagreb in October 2011. During his first professional season he collected 13 caps. Močinić scored his first goal for Rijeka in the last round of 2011–12 Prva HNL, against Karlovac 1919. During the following five seasons with Rijeka, he has been a regular starter on most occasions, collecting 141 appearances in the league, domestic cup and Europe. Močinić performed most consistently during the 2013–14 season when his solid performances earned him 47 appearances in all competitions. He particularly impressed in Rijeka's triumph over Dinamo Zagreb in the 2014 Croatian Football Cup Final. Močinić was team captain for the first time in the away loss to Dinamo Zagreb on 12 April 2014. During the 2015–16 season, he had more starts as the team captain than any other teammate.

During the 2015 winter transfer window, numerous clubs expressed interest in signing Močinić, namely Dinamo Zagreb, Newcastle United, Celtic, Rubin Kazan, Lazio, Sampdoria, Atalanta, Carpi, Bordeaux and Olympiacos. However, Rijeka rejected several offers and Močinić stayed with the club.

=== Rapid Wien ===
On 16 July 2016, both the Austrian and Croatian press reported that Močinić agreed terms with SK Rapid Wien, with the transfer valued at €2.5 million.

== International career ==
Močinić earned 21 caps for Croatia's under-19, under-20 and under-21 sides, including three caps at the 2012 UEFA European Under-19 Football Championship. His impressive performances in the first half of 2014 earned him a first call-up for the Croatia national football team. He was originally included in the 2014 FIFA World Cup squad for Croatia, but a last minute injury forced him out of the tournament. On 17 November 2015, Močinić made a senior national team début for Croatia in an away win against Russia, when he played the entire match. It was his sole international appearance.

== Career statistics ==
As of match played 15 December 2020

Club	Season	League	League		Cup		Europe		Other		Total	
Club	Season	League	Apps	Goals	Apps	Goals	Apps	Goals	Apps	Goals	Apps	Goals
Rijeka	2011–12	1. HNL	13	1	0	0	—		—		13	1
Rijeka	2012–13	1. HNL	19	1	1	0	—		—		20	1
Rijeka	2013–14	1. HNL	29	2	7	0	11 (Note: Appearances in UEFA Europa League)	1	—		47	3
Rijeka	2014–15	1. HNL	19	0	5	0	2	0	—		26	0
Rijeka	2015–16	1. HNL	31	0	2	0	1	0	—		34	0
Rijeka	2016–17	1. HNL	1	0	—		—		—		1	0
Rijeka total			112	4	15	0	14	1	0	0	141	5
Rapid	2016–17	Bundesliga	14	0	2	0	8	0	—		24	0
Rapid II	2017–18	Regionalliga	3	0	—		—		—		3	0
Rapid II	2018–19	Regionalliga	8	1	—		—		—		8	1
Rapid II total			11	1	0	0	0	0	0	0	11	1
Istra 1961	2019–20	1. HNL	19	1	1	0	—		2 (Note: Appearances in 1. HNL relegation play-offs)	0	22	1
Olimpija	2020–21	1. SNL	6	0	0	0	—		—		6	0
Career total			162	6	18	0	22	1	2	0	204	7

== Honours ==
=== Club ===
Rijeka

- Croatian Cup: 2013–14
- Croatian Super Cup: 2014

=== Individual ===
- Football Oscar Team of the Year: 2014
