= Drastin =

Settlement in Primorje-Gorski Kotar County, Croatia

- Settlement
- Interactive map of Drastin
- Location of Drastin in Croatia
- Coordinates: 45°22′43″N 14°26′52″E
- Country: Croatia
- County: Primorje-Gorski Kotar
- Municipality: Jelenje

Population (2021)
  - Total: 38
- Time zone: UTC+1 (CET)
  - Summer (DST): UTC+2 (CEST)
- Postal code: 51219 Čavle

Drastin is a settlement in the Municipality of Jelenje in Croatia. In 2021, its population was 38.

== Demographics ==
Drastin: Population trends 1857–2021
v

population	73	74	81	85	83	71	68	62	55	46	52	46	30	21	20	17	38
	1857	1869	1880	1890	1900	1910	1921	1931	1948	1953	1961	1971	1981	1991	2001	2011	2021

Sources: Croatian Bureau of Statistics publications
