= Baštijani =

Settlement in Primorje-Gorski Kotar County, Croatia

- Settlement
- Interactive map of Baštijani
- Location of Baštijani in Croatia
- Coordinates: 45°23′11″N 14°26′03″E
- Country: Croatia
- County: Primorje-Gorski Kotar
- Municipality: Jelenje

Area
  - Total: 0.8 km^{2} (0.31 sq mi)

Population (2021)
  - Total: 14
  - Density: 18/km^{2} (45/sq mi)
- Time zone: UTC+1 (CET)
  - Summer (DST): UTC+2 (CEST)
- Postal code: 51219 Čavle

Baštijani is a settlement in the Municipality of Jelenje in Croatia. In 2021, its population was 14.

== Demographics ==
Baštijani: Population trends 1857–2021
v

population	306	307	32	15	12	25	446	424	17	19	16	14	12	14	17	18	14
	1857	1869	1880	1890	1900	1910	1921	1931	1948	1953	1961	1971	1981	1991	2001	2011	2021

Sources: Croatian Bureau of Statistics publications
