= Lopača =

Settlement in Primorje-Gorski Kotar County, Croatia

- Settlement
- Interactive map of Lopača
- Location of Lopača in Croatia
- Coordinates: 45°22′41″N 14°26′28″E
- Country: Croatia
- County: Primorje-Gorski Kotar
- Municipality: Jelenje

Area
  - Total: 0.9 km^{2} (0.35 sq mi)

Population (2021)
  - Total: 78
  - Density: 87/km^{2} (220/sq mi)
- Time zone: UTC+1 (CET)
  - Summer (DST): UTC+2 (CEST)
- Postal code: 51219 Čavle

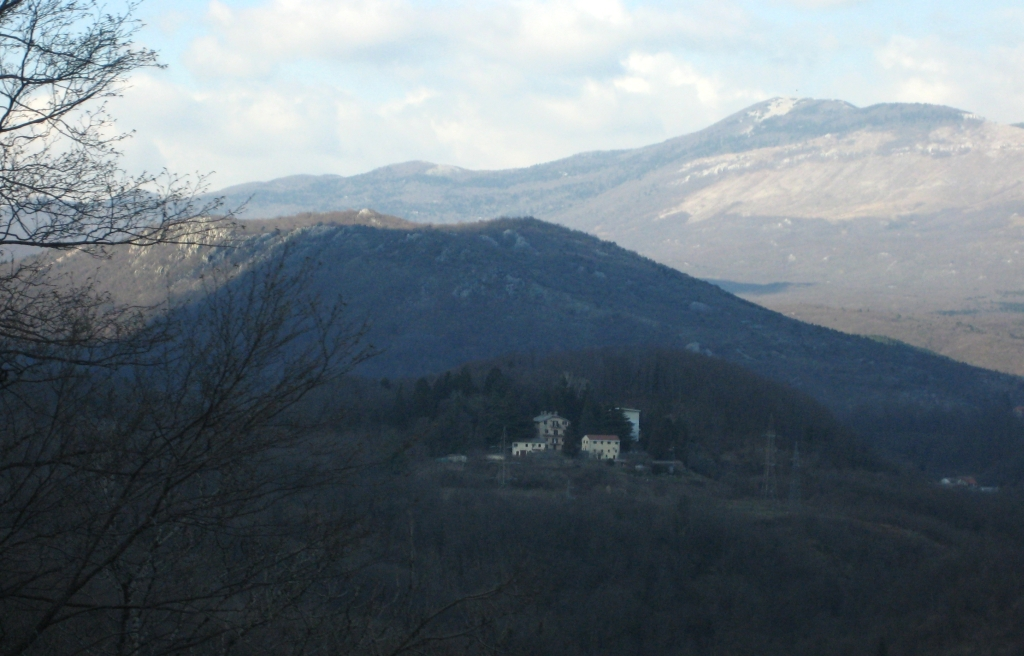

Lopača is a settlement in the Municipality of Jelenje in Croatia. In 2021, its population was 78.

== Demographics ==
Lopača: Population trends 1857–2021
v

population										18	60	263			71	87	78
	1857	1869	1880	1890	1900	1910	1921	1931	1948	1953	1961	1971	1981	1991	2001	2011	2021

Sources: Croatian Bureau of Statistics publications
