= Mate Bajić =

Croatian footballer

Personal information
- Date of birth: 3 November 1995 (age 30)
- Place of birth: Dortmund, Germany
- Height: 1.75 m (5 ft 9 in)
- Position: Forward

Team information
- Current team: Tomislav Cerna
- Number: 9

Youth career
- 2003–2006: Zrinski Tordinci
- 2006–2011: Cibalia
- 2011–2012: Dinamo Zagreb
- 2012–2013: Cibalia

Senior career*
Years	Team	Apps	(Gls)
2013–2015	Cibalia	24	(1)
2015–2016	Rijeka	0	(0)
2015–2016	→ Rijeka II	32	(9)
2016–2017	Val Kaštel Stari	14	(4)
2017	Primorac BNM	13	(6)
2017–2018	Bedem Ivankovo	23	(8)
2018–2020	Cibalia	46	(8)
2021	Bijelo Brdo	12	(1)
2021	Primorac BNM	12	(2)
2022-	Tomislav Cerna	6	(3)

International career
2011	Croatia U16	4	(0)
2013−2014	Croatia U19	4	(0)
- * Club domestic league appearances and goals as of 00:44, 27 April 2022 (UTC)

Mate Bajić (born 3 November 1995) is a German-born Croatian professional footballer, who plays for Tomislav Cerna.

== Career ==
=== Cibalia ===
In August 2012, Bajić signed his first professional contract with HNK Cibalia in Croatia's 1. HNL. He made his debut on 26 May 2013, in the final round of the 2012–13 Croatian First Football League. He entered as a substitute in the 67th minute in Cibalia's away loss to NK Osijek, what proved to be the club's last top-tier match. Although Cibalia was relegated to 2. HNL, Bajić stayed with the club during 2013–14 and the first half of 2014–15.

=== Rijeka ===
In February 2015, Bajić signed a contract with HNK Rijeka in 1. HNL that ties him with the club until June 2017. In his first half-season with the club, Bajić played for Rijeka II in 3. HNL. During the 2015–16 season, Bajić was a regular starter for Rijeka II, scoring 6 goals.

In January 2016, Bajić was one of several Rijeka II players who were brought in to the first-team's pre-season training camp in Dubai. He was capped in four of Rijeka's mid-season friendlies. However, following the end of the season, Rijeka did not renew his contract.
