= Martinovo Selo =

Settlement in Primorje-Gorski Kotar County, Croatia

- Settlement
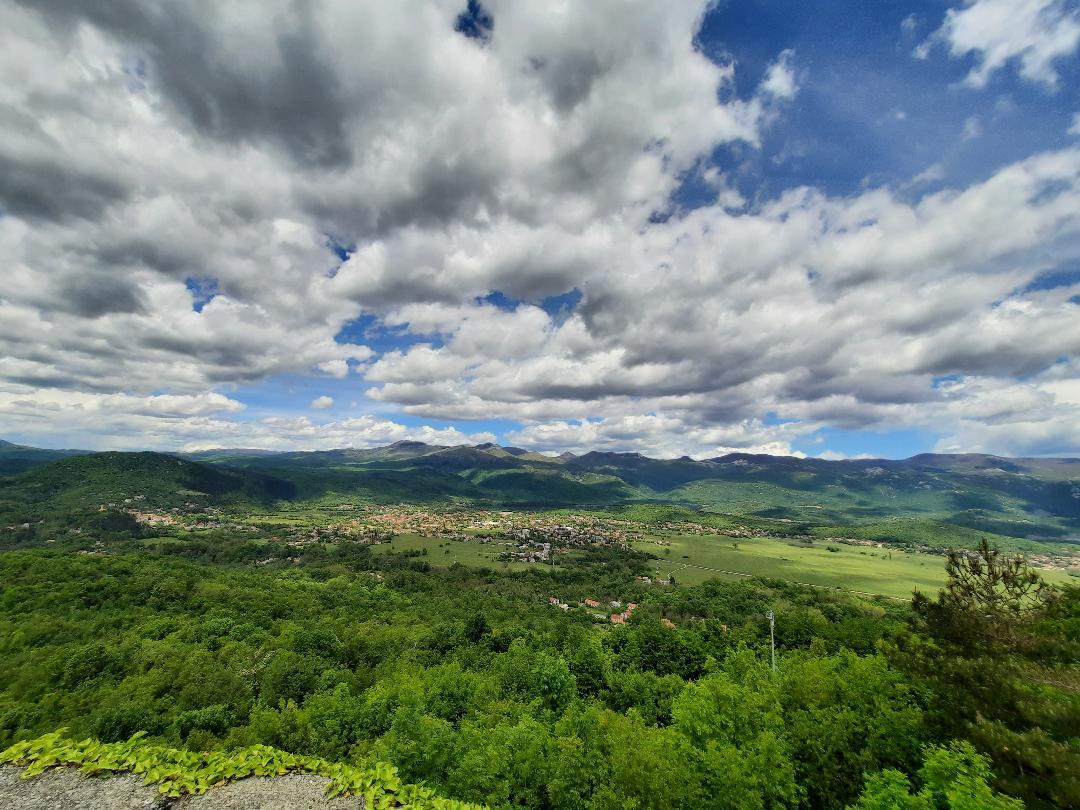
- Interactive map of Martinovo Selo
- Location of Martinovo Selo in Croatia
- Coordinates: 45°23′13″N 14°26′25″E
- Country: Croatia
- County: Primorje-Gorski Kotar
- Municipality: Jelenje

Area
  - Total: 0.2 km^{2} (0.077 sq mi)

Population (2021)
  - Total: 112
  - Density: 560/km^{2} (1,500/sq mi)
- Time zone: UTC+1 (CET)
  - Summer (DST): UTC+2 (CEST)
- Postal code: 51219 Čavle

Martinovo Selo is a settlement in the Municipality of Jelenje in Croatia. In 2021, its population was 112.

== Demographics ==
Martinovo Selo: Population trends 1857–2021
v

population	169	156	162	161	183	212	169	164	142	137	134	146	150	131	129	117	112
	1857	1869	1880	1890	1900	1910	1921	1931	1948	1953	1961	1971	1981	1991	2001	2011	2021

Sources: Croatian Bureau of Statistics publications
