= Gerald Diyoke =

Nigerian footballer

Personal information
- Full name: Gerald Chibueze Diyoke
- Date of birth: March 11, 1996 (age 30)
- Place of birth: Kaduna, Nigeria
- Height: 1.75 m (5 ft 9 in)
- Position: Midfielder

Team information
- Current team: Trnje
- Number: 28

Youth career
- –2014: Abuja Football College Academy
- 2014: Rijeka

Senior career*
Years	Team	Apps	(Gls)
2014–2019	Rijeka	1	(0)
2014–2016	→ Rijeka II	49	(1)
2017	→ Šibenik (loan)	13	(0)
2017–2018	→ Krško (loan)	7	(0)
2018	→ Dugopolje (loan)	7	(0)
2019	Brežice 1919	6	(0)
2020–2023	Cibalia	70	(10)
2023	Kustošija	6	(0)
2024	Jarun	14	(0)
2024–2025	Zagreb	24	(1)
2025–	Trnje	27	(0)
- * Club domestic league appearances and goals as of 18 July 2026

Gerald Chibueze Diyoke (born March 11, 1996) is a Nigerian footballer who plays as a midfielder for NK Trnje.

== Club career ==
Gerald moved to Rijeka in early 2014 from its affiliate in Nigeria, the Abuja Football College Academy, following in the footsteps of several of his compatriots. In April 2014, he signed his first contract with HNK Rijeka that ties him with the club until the end of 2016. In his first season with the club, Gerald played for Rijeka Reserves in the Croatian Third Football League. With 28 appearances, he was the most capped Rijeka II player during 2014–15. In the first half of the 2015–16 season, Gerald was a regular starter for Rijeka II, missing only one match due to suspension.

In January 2016, Gerald was one of several Rijeka II players who were brought in to the first-team's pre-season training camp in Dubai. He was capped in four of Rijeka’s mid-season friendlies and subsequently included in the first-team squad. On 14 May 2016, he made his official debut for the first team, when he entered as a substitute in a home win against Istra 1961 in the final round of the 2015–16 Croatian First Football League. In January 2017, Gerald was loaned to HNK Šibenik in Croatian Second Football League until the end of the season.
