= Trnovica, Primorje-Gorski Kotar County =

Settlement in Primorje-Gorski Kotar County, Croatia

Trnovica
- Settlement
- Interactive map of Trnovica
- Location of Trnovica in Croatia
- Coordinates: 45°23′40″N 14°25′32″E
- Country: Croatia
- County: Primorje-Gorski Kotar
- Municipality: Jelenje

Area
  - Total: 0.7 km^{2} (0.27 sq mi)

Population (2021)
  - Total: 49
  - Density: 70/km^{2} (180/sq mi)
- Time zone: UTC+1 (CET)
  - Summer (DST): UTC+2 (CEST)
- Postal code: 51219 Čavle

Trnovica is a settlement in the Municipality of Jelenje in Croatia. In 2021, its population was 49.

== Demographics ==
Trnovica: Population trends 1857–2021
v

population			54	97	116	134			102	86	96	73	76	58	61	47	49
	1857	1869	1880	1890	1900	1910	1921	1931	1948	1953	1961	1971	1981	1991	2001	2011	2021

Sources: Croatian Bureau of Statistics publications
