= Ratulje =

Settlement in Primorje-Gorski Kotar County, Croatia

- Settlement
- Interactive map of Ratulje
- Location of Ratulje in Croatia
- Coordinates: 45°23′08″N 14°26′42″E
- Country: Croatia
- County: Primorje-Gorski Kotar
- Municipality: Jelenje

Area
  - Total: 0.2 km^{2} (0.077 sq mi)

Population (2021)
  - Total: 84
  - Density: 420/km^{2} (1,100/sq mi)
- Time zone: UTC+1 (CET)
  - Summer (DST): UTC+2 (CEST)
- Postal code: 51219 Čavle

Ratulje is a settlement in the Municipality of Jelenje in Croatia. In 2021, its population was 84.

== Demographics ==
Ratulje: Population trends 1857–2021
v

population	93	80	79	83	88	95	108	137	143	123	123	110	106	114	109	114	84
	1857	1869	1880	1890	1900	1910	1921	1931	1948	1953	1961	1971	1981	1991	2001	2011	2021

Sources: Croatian Bureau of Statistics publications
