= Jelenje =

- Municipality
- Općina Jelenje; Municipality of Jelenje
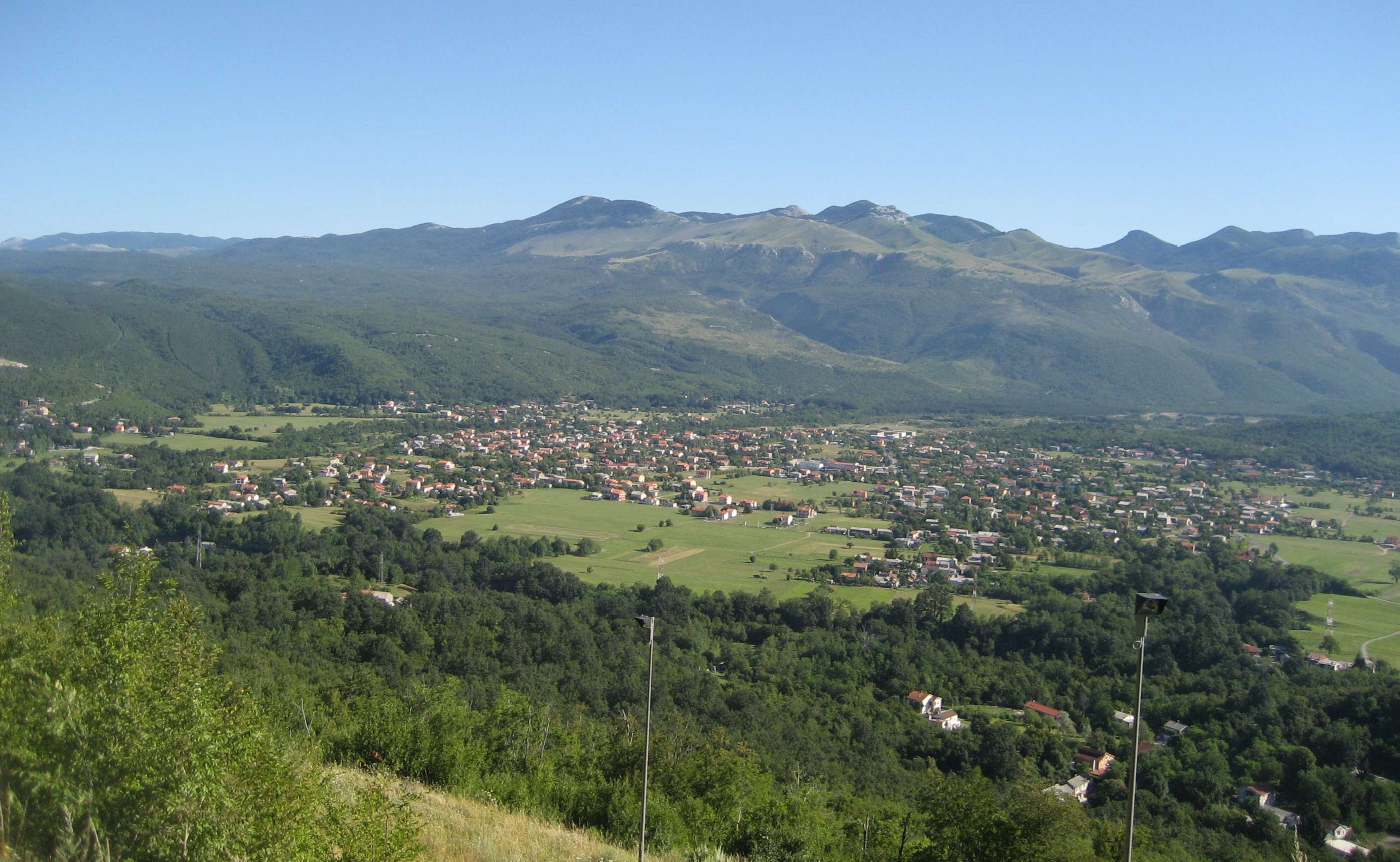
- View over Dražice in Jelenje

- Location within Croatia
- Coordinates: 45°23′N 14°28′E
- Country: Croatia
- County: Primorje-Gorski Kotar County

Government
  - Mayor: Robert Marčelja (PGS)
  - City Council: 15 members: PGS (5); _; Independents (4); _; SDP-ARS-HNS-HSS (3); _; HDZ (2); _; AM (1)

Area
  - Municipality: 109.1 km^{2} (42.1 sq mi)
  - Urban: 51.2 km^{2} (19.8 sq mi)

Population (2021)
  - Municipality: 5,096
  - Density: 46.71/km^{2} (121.0/sq mi)
  - Urban: 395
  - Urban density: 7.71/km^{2} (20.0/sq mi)
- Time zone: UTC+1 (CET)
  - Summer (DST): UTC+2 (CEST)
- Area code: 051
- Website: jelenje.hr

Jelenje is a village and municipality in the Primorje-Gorski Kotar County in western Croatia. As of 2021, the municipality had a population of 5,096 with 94.6% Croats. The village itself had an urban population of 395.

== History ==
After the Lujzijana was built, the Družtvo lujzinske ceste constructed a building in Jelenje together with stables and two cisterns. In 1874, the society would sell all its assets along the road, including those in Jelenje.

A 22 December 1939 decision as part of agrarian reforms by Ban Šubašić to confiscate the forest property in Jelenje and surroundings of the Thurn and Taxis family, Kálmán Ghyczy and Nikola Petrović resulted in a legal dispute known as the Thurn and Taxis Affair, in part because of the relative status of the family and in part because of the proximity to the Italian border.

== Demographics ==
In 1895, the obćina of Jelenje (court at Jelenje), with an area of 138 square kilometres (53 mi^{2}), belonged to the kotar of Sušak (Bakar court and electoral district) in the županija of Modruš-Rieka (Ogulin court and financial board). There were 697 houses, with a population of 3208. Its 13 villages and 8 hamlets were divided for taxation purposes into 3 porezne obćine, under the Bakar office.

In the 2011 census, the municipality consisted of the following settlements:

- Baštijani, population 18
- Brnelići, population 85
- Drastin, population 17
- Dražice, population 2,093
- Jelenje, population 425
- Kukuljani, population 87
- Lopača, population 87
- Lubarska, population 114
- Lukeži, population 193
- Martinovo Selo, population 117
- Milaši, population 76
- Podhum, population 1,446
- Podkilavac, population 332
- Ratulje, population 114
- Trnovica, population 47
- Valići, population 1
- Zoretići, population 92

== Nature ==
Zygaena loti has been recorded in Jelenje.

== Bibliography ==
=== Biology ===
- Šašić, Martina; Nahirnić, Ana; Tarmann, Gerhard M. (2016-12-31). "Zygaenidae (Lepidoptera) in the Lepidoptera collections of the Croatian Natural History Museum". Natura Croatica: Periodicum Musei Historiae Naturalis Croatici. 25 (2): 233–248. doi:10.20302/NC.2016.25.19. eISSN 1848-7386.

=== History ===
- CKHSGR (1855-03-19) [written 1855-02-16]. "Oglas od strane c. k. hèrv. slav. gruntovnicah ravnateljstva". Carsko kraljevske službene narodne novine (in Serbo-Croatian). Vol. 21, no. 64. p. 190. ISSN 1333-5243.
- Prusac, Stjepan (2023-09-26) [defended 2023-09-25]. Posjedi obitelji Thurn Taxis nakon 1918. godine [Thurn Taxis Estates in Croatia after First World War] (Thesis) (in Croatian). Zagreb: Filozofski fakultet Sveučilišta u Zagrebu.
- V.R.T. (June 2009). "Novo vozilo i garaža za DVD Jelenje" (PDF). Nazovi 193 (in Croatian). Vol. 2, no. 3. p. 19. Archived from the original (PDF) on 2022-09-27.
- Banska vlast Banovine Hrvatske (1940b). "Gospodarska prosvjeta i banovinska dobra". Godišnjak banske vlasti Banovine Hrvatske. Vol. 1. pp. 89–96.
