= Dražice, Rimavská Sobota District =

Village and municipality in Slovakia

Dražice Perjése
- Municipality
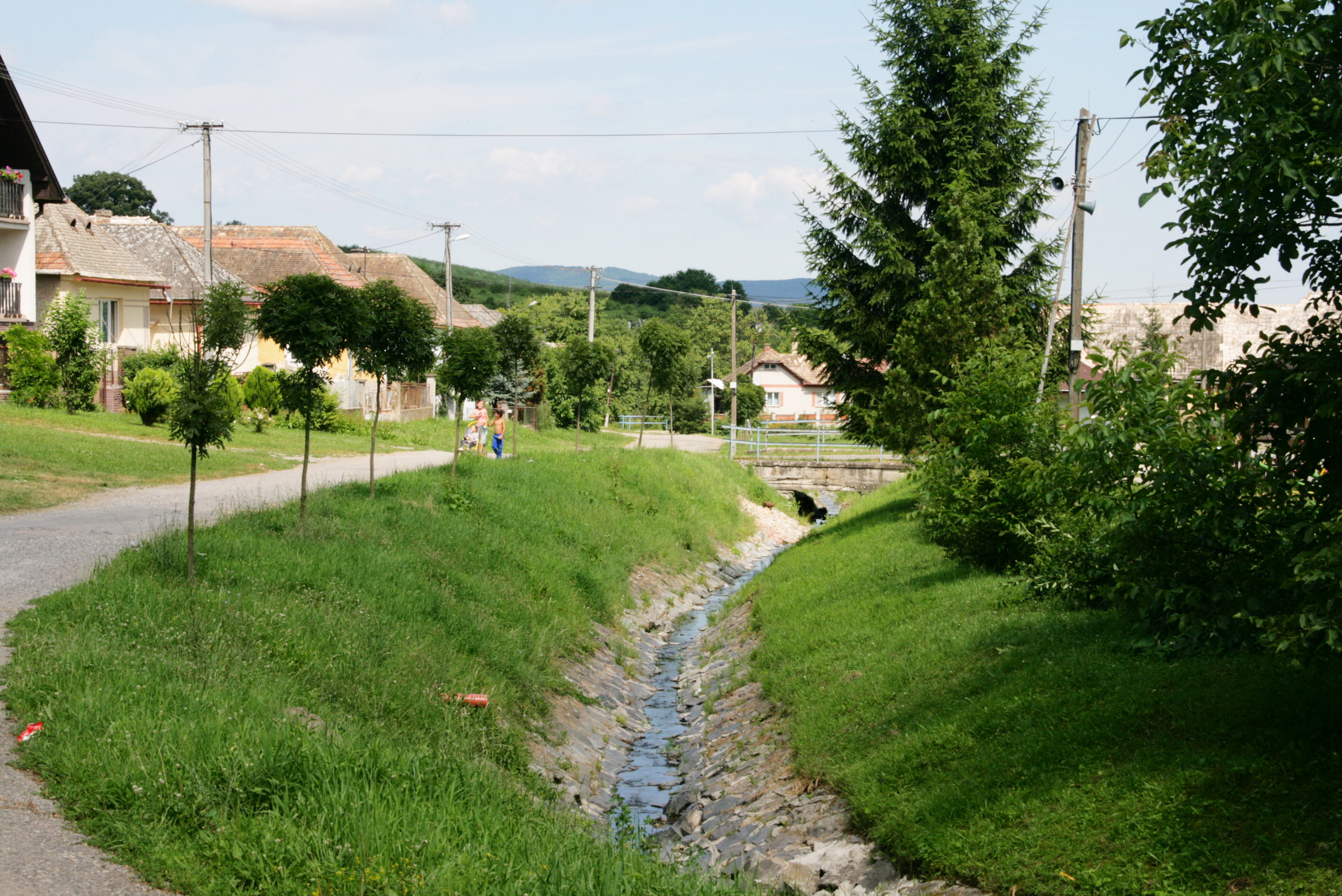

- Flag

- Location of Dražice in the Banská Bystrica Region Location of Dražice in Slovakia
- Coordinates: 48°26′N 20°04′E
- Country: Slovakia
- Region: Banská Bystrica Region
- District: Rimavská Sobota District
- First mentioned: 1323

Area
  - Total: 11.50 km^{2} (4.44 sq mi)
- Elevation: 275 m (902 ft)

Population (2025)
  - Total: 248
- Time zone: UTC+1 (CET)
  - Summer (DST): UTC+2 (CEST)
- Postal code: 980 23
- Area code: +421 47
- Vehicle registration plate (until 2022): RS
- Website: www.drazice.sk

Dražice (Hungarian: Perjése, formerly: Perjesse) is a village and municipality in the Rimavská Sobota District of the Banská Bystrica Region of Slovakia.

== History ==
In historical records, the village was first mentioned in 1323 (1323 Peryese, 1393 Peryeze), when it belonged to Blh Castle. It then passed to the Széchy family (16th century) and to Muráň (17th century). From 1938 to 1944 it belonged to Hungary under the First Vienna Award.

== Population ==
Population statistic (10 years)
Year	1995	2005	2015	2025
Count	180	223	268	248
Difference		+23.88%	+20.17%	−7.46%

Population statistic
Year	2024	2025
Count	248	248
Difference		+0%

It has a population of 248 people (31 December 2025).

=== Ethnicity ===
Census 2021 (1+ %)
Ethnicity	Number	Fraction
Hungarian	122	48.03%
Slovak	119	46.85%
Romani	50	19.68%
Not found out	17	6.69%
Total	254	

In year 2021 was 254 people by ethnicity 122 as Hungarian, 119 as Slovak, 50 as Romani, 17 as Not found out and 1 as Czech.

Note on population: The difference values of population numbers in the table "Population statistic" and in the sections "Ethnicity" & "Religion" is caused by the use of various statistical methods.

=== Religion ===
Census 2021 (1+ %)
Religion	Number	Fraction
Roman Catholic Church	105	41.34%
None	80	31.5%
Evangelical Church	49	19.29%
Not found out	15	5.91%
Greek Catholic Church	4	1.57%
Total	254	

In year 2021 was 254 people by religion 105 from Roman Catholic Church, 80 from None, 49 from Evangelical Church, 15 from Not found out, 4 from Greek Catholic Church and 1 from Calvinist Church.

== Genealogical resources ==
The records for genealogical research are available at the state archive "Statny Archiv in Banska Bystrica, Slovakia"

- Roman Catholic church records (births/marriages/deaths): 1829-1887 (parish B)
- Lutheran church records (births/marriages/deaths): 1685-1897 (parish B)
- Reformated church records (births/marriages/deaths): 1782-1862 (parish B)

== See also ==
- List of municipalities and towns in Slovakia
