= Dražičky =

- Municipality
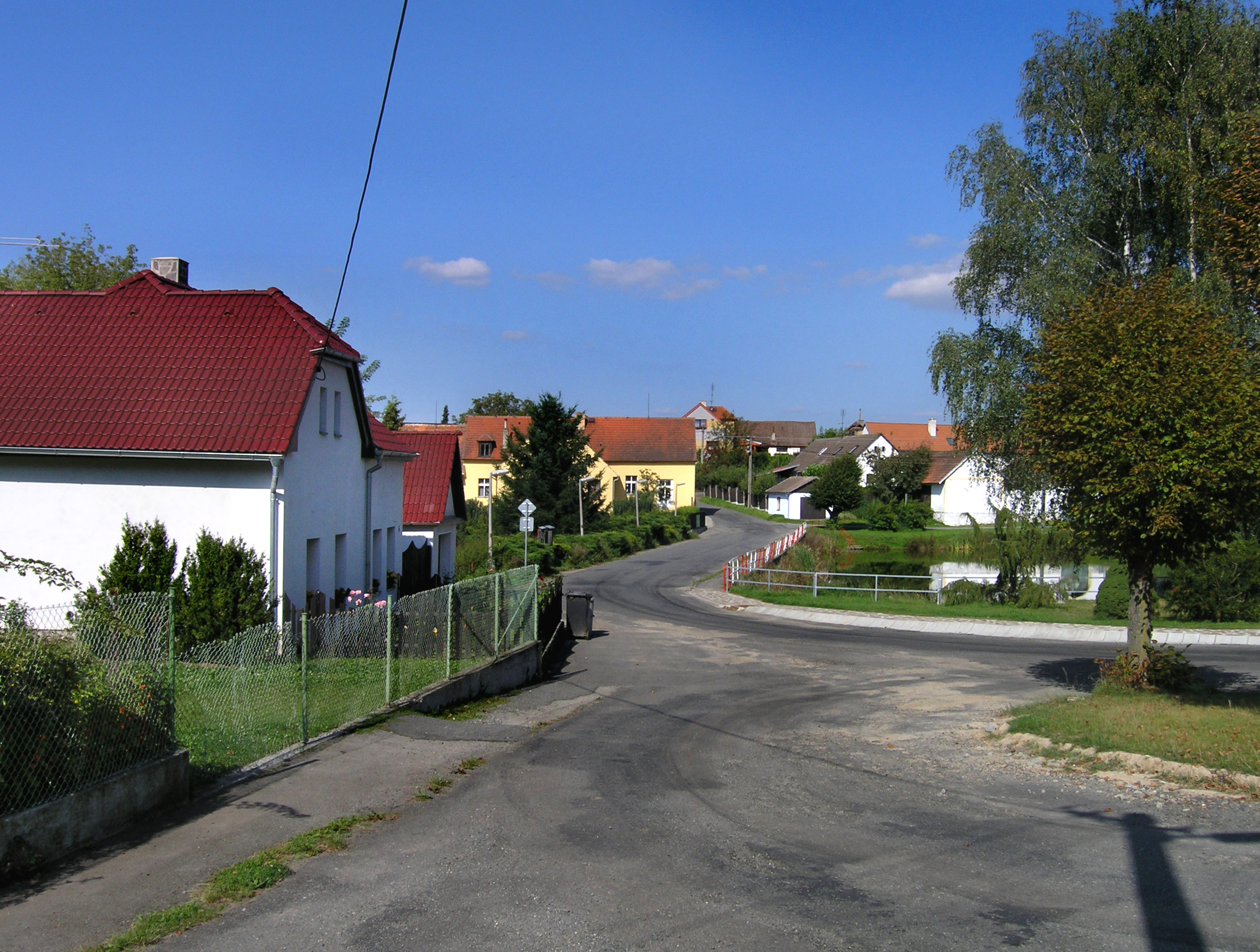
- Centre of Dražičky

- Location in the Czech Republic
- Coordinates: 49°23′57″N 14°35′55″E
- Country: Czech Republic
- Region: South Bohemian
- District: Tábor
- First mentioned: 1379

Area
  - Total: 5.13 km^{2} (1.98 sq mi)
- Elevation: 454 m (1,490 ft)

Population (2026-01-01)
  - Total: 178
  - Density: 34.7/km^{2} (89.9/sq mi)
- Time zone: UTC+1 (CET)
  - Summer (DST): UTC+2 (CEST)
- Postal code: 391 75
- Website: www.drazicky.cz

Dražičky is a municipality and village in Tábor District in the South Bohemian Region of the Czech Republic. It has about 200 inhabitants.

Dražičky lies approximately 6 kilometres (4 mi) south-west of Tábor, 48 km (30 mi) north of České Budějovice, and 78 km (48 mi) south of Prague.

== Demographics ==
Historical population
Year	Pop.	±%
1869	307	—
1880	324	+5.5%
1890	294	−9.3%
1900	261	−11.2%
1910	249	−4.6%
1921	205	−17.7%
1930	206	+0.5%
1950	151	−26.7%
1961	151	+0.0%
1970	134	−11.3%
1980	112	−16.4%
1991	79	−29.5%
2001	67	−15.2%
2011	147	+119.4%
2021	159	+8.2%
Source: Censuses
