= Milaši =

Settlement in Primorje-Gorski Kotar County, Croatia

- Settlement
- Interactive map of Milaši
- Location of Milaši in Croatia
- Coordinates: 45°23′33″N 14°25′56″E
- Country: Croatia
- County: Primorje-Gorski Kotar
- Municipality: Jelenje

Area
  - Total: 0.3 km^{2} (0.12 sq mi)

Population (2021)
  - Total: 76
  - Density: 250/km^{2} (660/sq mi)
- Time zone: UTC+1 (CET)
  - Summer (DST): UTC+2 (CEST)
- Postal code: 51219 Čavle

Milaši is a settlement in the Municipality of Jelenje in Croatia. In 2021, its population was 76.

== Demographics ==
Milaši: Population trends 1857–2021
v

population	89	107	108	124	123	157	135	142	77	67	68	64	70	60	60	76	76
	1857	1869	1880	1890	1900	1910	1921	1931	1948	1953	1961	1971	1981	1991	2001	2011	2021

Sources: Croatian Bureau of Statistics publications
