= Robert Brdar =

Croatian football midfielder

Personal information
- Full name: Robert Brdar
- Date of birth: 3 April 1995 (age 31)
- Place of birth: Rijeka, Croatia
- Position: Midfielder

Team information
- Current team: Vinodol

Youth career
- 2005–2009: Grobničan
- 2009–2014: Rijeka

Senior career*
Years	Team	Apps	(Gls)
2014–2015	Zavrč	15	(1)
2015	Grobničan	12	(2)
2015–2016	Lošinj	12	(6)
2016	Novigrad	2	(0)
2016–2017	Orijent 1919	14	(5)
2017–2019	Krk	46	(31)
2019–2020	Lučko	0	(0)
2020–2021	Orijent 1919	12	(2)
2021	Grobničan		
2022–	Vinodol		
- * Club domestic league appearances and goals as of 9 March 2021

Robert Brdar (born 3 April 1995) is a Croatian football midfielder who currently plays for Vinodol.
