= Dražice, Croatia =

Village in Primorje-Gorski Kotar, Croatia

Dražice
- Village
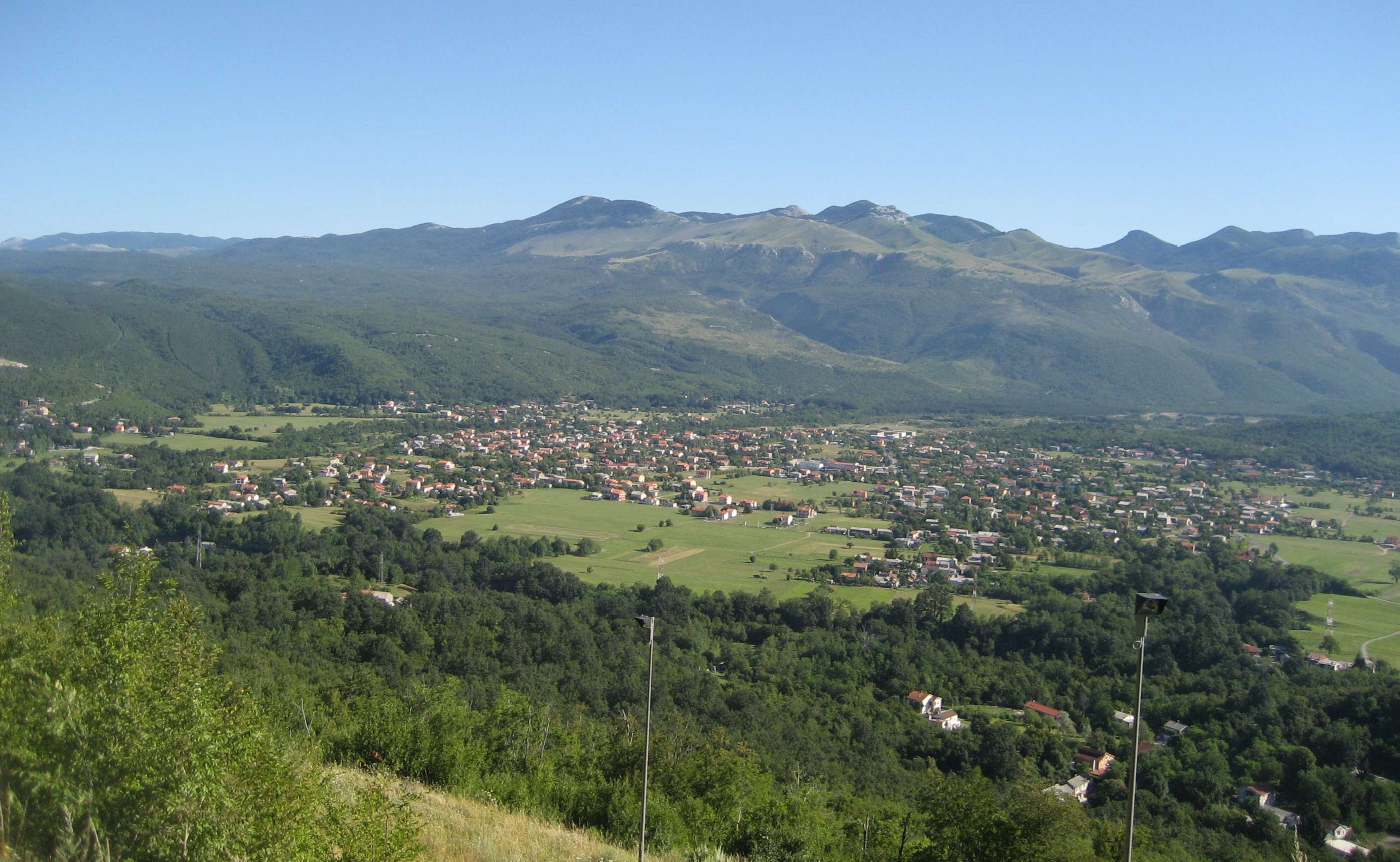
- View of Dražice

- Location within Croatia
- Coordinates: 45.38884°N 14.46646°E
- Country: Croatia
- County: Primorje-Gorski Kotar
- Municipality: Jelenje

Area
  - Total: 2.0 km^{2} (0.77 sq mi)

Population (2021)
  - Total: 2,064
  - Density: 1,000/km^{2} (2,700/sq mi)
- Time zone: UTC+1 (CET)
  - Summer (DST): UTC+2 (CEST)
- Postal code: 51218
- Area code: 051
- Vehicle registration: RI

Dražice is a village in Primorje-Gorski Kotar, western Croatia. Dražice is located south of Podkilavac and west of Podhum. It is part of the municipality of Jelenje. As of 2021, it had a population of 2,064.

== History ==
A 22 December 1939 decision as part of agrarian reforms by Ban Šubašić to confiscate the forest property in Dražice and surroundings of the Thurn and Taxis family, Kálmán Ghyczy and Nikola Petrović resulted in a legal dispute known as the Thurn and Taxis Affair, in part because of the relative status of the family and in part because of the proximity to the Italian border.

== Bibliography ==
- Prusac, Stjepan (2023-09-26) [defended 2023-09-25]. Posjedi obitelji Thurn Taxis nakon 1918. godine [Thurn Taxis Estates in Croatia after First World War] (Thesis) (in Croatian). Zagreb: Filozofski fakultet Sveučilišta u Zagrebu.
- Banska vlast Banovine Hrvatske (1940b). "Gospodarska prosvjeta i banovinska dobra". Godišnjak banske vlasti Banovine Hrvatske. Vol. 1. pp. 89–96.
