= 2023 Croatian Football Cup final =

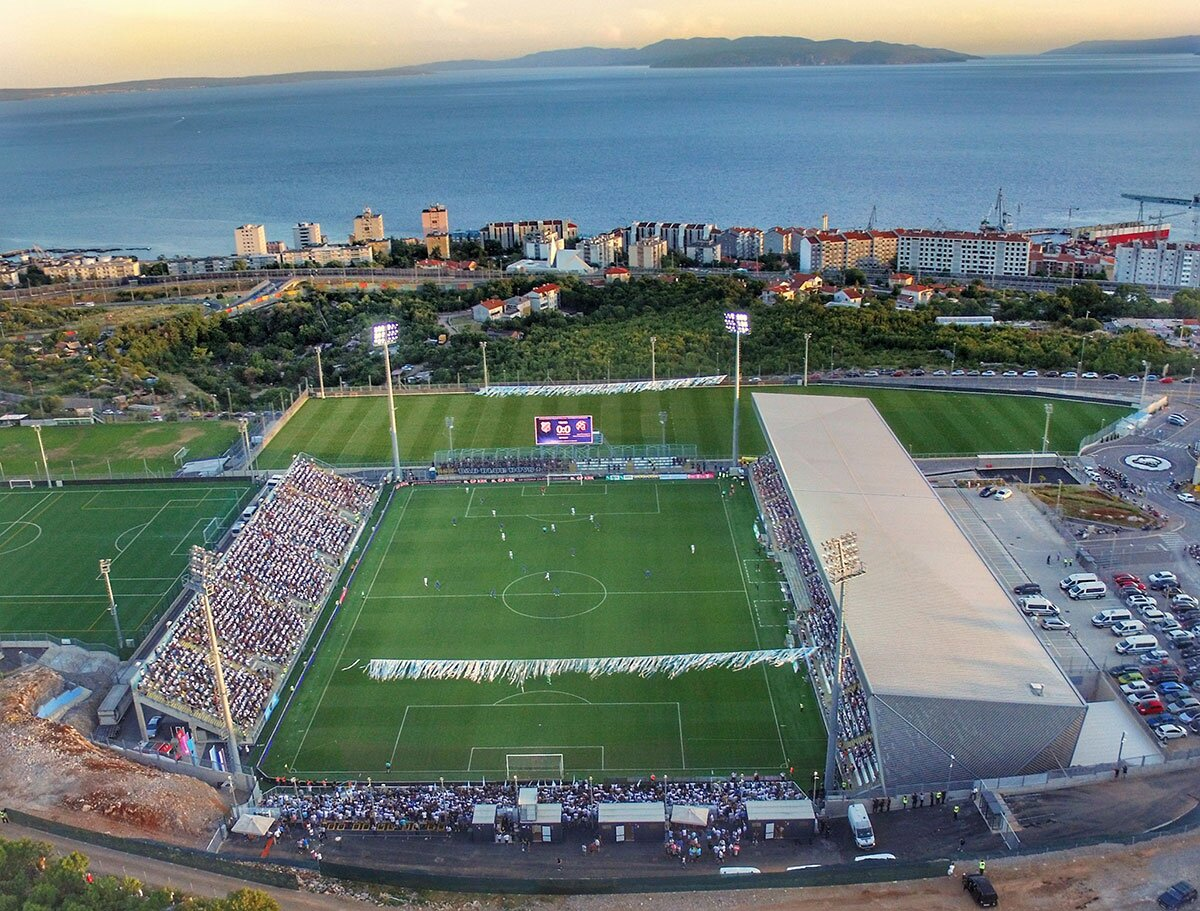
- Stadion Rujevica in Rijeka hosted the final
- Event: 2022–23 Croatian Cup
Hajduk Split	Šibenik
HNL	HNL
2	0
- Date: 24 May 2023
- Venue: Stadion Rujevica, Rijeka
- Referee: Igor Pajač (Sveti Ivan Zelina)
- Attendance: 7,041

The 2023 Croatian Cup final between the Dalmatian rivals Hajduk Split and Šibenik was played on 24 May 2023 in Rijeka.

Hajduk Split won the trophy with a result of 2–0. This was the last one-legged final until 2026.

== Road to the final ==
Hajduk Split		Round	Šibenik	
Opponent	Result		Opponent	Result
Bye		Preliminary round	Bye	
Tehničar Cvetkovec	5–1	First round	Jadran Poreč	2–1
Mladost Ždralovi	2–0	Second round	Gorica	2−0
Osijek	2–1	Quarter-finals	BSK Bijelo Brdo	2–0
Slaven Belupo	1–0	Semi-finals	Dinamo Zagreb	2–1

== Match details ==
24 May 2023
19:00 CEST

Hajduk Split	2–0	Šibenik
Melnjak 64'; Livaja 90+4' (pen.)	Report

Stadion Rujevica, Rijeka
Attendance: 7,041
Referee: Igor Pajač (Sveti Ivan Zelina)

Hajduk Split	Šibenik

GK	13	(Austria) Ivan Lučić
RB	43	(Canada) Niko Sigur
CB	25	(Nigeria) Chidozie Awaziem
CB	97	(Portugal) Ferro		(substituted off) 90+2'
LB	17	(Croatia) Dario Melnjak
CM	23	(Croatia) Filip Krovinović
CM	21	(United States) Rokas Pukštas
RW	77	(Kosovo) Emir Sahiti		(substituted off) 79'
AM	11	(Morocco) Yassine Benrahou		(substituted off) 86'
LW	29	(Slovenia) Jan Mlakar
CF	10	(Croatia) Marko Livaja (c)	(yellow card) 90+5'
Substitutes:
GK	1	(Croatia) Danijel Subašić
DF	6	(Italy) Marco Fossati		(substituted on) 86'
DF	8	(Czech Republic) Stefan Simić
DF	33	(Kosovo) Elvis Letaj
DF	42	(Croatia) Niko Đolonga
DF	44	(Croatia) Luka Vušković		(substituted on) 90+2'
MF	20	(United States) Agustin Anello		(substituted on) 79'
MF	88	(Croatia) Ivan Ćubelić
FW	9	(Croatia) Nikola Kalinić
Manager:
(Croatia) Ivan Leko

GK	1	(Croatia) Antonio Đaković
RB	88	(Bosnia and Herzegovina) Zoran Kvržić (c)
CB	5	(Austria) Stefan Perić
CB	3	(Bosnia and Herzegovina) Josip Kvesić		(substituted off) 69'
LB	17	(Colombia) Marcos Mina		(substituted off) 69'
RM	37	(Japan) Haruki Arai
CM	33	(Serbia) Nikola Đorić		(substituted off) 86'
CM	6	(Croatia) Marko Soldo		(substituted off) 79'
LM	24	(Bosnia and Herzegovina) Amer Hiroš
CF	34	(Croatia) Karlo Špeljak		(substituted off) 69'
CF	11	(Croatia) Ivan Dolček
Substitutes:
GK	95	(Croatia) Lovre Rogić
DF	6	(Colombia) Juan Camilo Mesa		(substituted on) 69'
DF	16	(Croatia) Viktor Damjanić
DF	25	(Australia) Doni Grdić		(substituted on) 86'
DF	31	(Croatia) Josip Baturina
MF	4	(Croatia) Mislav Matić
MF	21	(Spain) Iker Pozo	(yellow card) 89'	(substituted on) 69'
MF	77	(Croatia) Dario Čanađija	(yellow card) 72'	(substituted on) 69'
FW	30	(Croatia) Josip Knežević		(substituted on) 79'
Manager:
(Austria) Damir Čanadi

Assistant referees:
Sanja Rođak-Karšić (Podravske Sesvete)
Vedran Đurak (Sveti Ivan Zelina)
Fourth official:
Patrik Kolarić (Čakovec)
Video assistant referee:
Fran Jović (Zagreb)
Assistant video assistant referee:
Bojan Zobenica (Velika Gorica)

Match rules

- 90 minutes.
- 30 minutes of extra-time if necessary.
- Penalty shoot-out if scores still level.
- Nine named substitutes.
- Maximum of five substitutions.
