= 2022–23 HNK Hajduk Split season =

Hajduk Split
2022–23 season
- Chairman: Lukša Jakobušić
- Manager: Valdas Dambrauskas (until 12 September 2022); Mislav Karoglan (12 September 2022 - 31 December 2022); Ivan Leko (since 31 December 2022)
- HNL: 2nd
- Croatian Cup: Winners
- Europa Conference League: Play-off round
- Croatian Super Cup: Runners-up
- Top goalscorer: League: Marko Livaja (19); All: Marko Livaja (21)
- Highest home attendance: 32,600 (vs. Dinamo Zagreb) (21 October 2022)
- Lowest home attendance: 9,358 (vs. Šibenik) (22 January 2023)
- Average home league attendance: 15,345
Home colours	Away colours	Third colours

The 2022–23 season was the 112th season in Hajduk Split’s history and their thirty-second in the HNL.

== First-team squad ==
For details of former players, see List of HNK Hajduk Split players.

As of 21 May 2023

Note: Flags indicate national team as defined under FIFA eligibility rules; some limited exceptions apply. Players may hold more than one non-FIFA nationality.

No.	Pos.	Nation	Player
1	GK	CRO	Danijel Subašić
3	DF	CRO	Dominik Prpić
4	DF	POR	Ferro
5	DF	CRO	Toni Borevković (on loan from Vitória de Guimarães)
6	MF	ITA	Marco Fossati
7	MF	AUS	Anthony Kalik
8	DF	CZE	Stefan Simić
9	FW	CRO	Nikola Kalinić
10	FW	CRO	Marko Livaja (Vice-captain)
11	MF	MAR	Yassine Benrahou
13	GK	AUT	Ivan Lučić
14	MF	AUT	Lukas Grgić
17	DF	CRO	Dario Melnjak
19	DF	CRO	Josip Elez (3rd captain)
20	MF	USA	Agustin Anello (on loan from Lommel)

No.	Pos.	Nation	Player
21	MF	USA	Rokas Pukštas
23	MF	CRO	Filip Krovinović
24	DF	CRO	Dino Mikanović
25	DF	NGR	Chidozie Awaziem (on loan from Boavista)
26	DF	HUN	Gergő Lovrencsics
28	MF	CRO	Roko Brajković
29	FW	SLO	Jan Mlakar
30	GK	CRO	Karlo Sentić
33	DF	KOS	Elvis Letaj
34	MF	CRO	Marko Capan
43	DF	CAN	Niko Sigur
44	DF	CRO	Luka Vušković
77	MF	KOS	Emir Sahiti
88	MF	CRO	Ivan Ćubelić
91	GK	CRO	Lovre Kalinić (Captain)

== Competitions ==
=== Overview ===
Competition	First match	Last match	Starting round	Final position	Record							
Competition	First match	Last match	Starting round	Final position	Pld	W	D	L	GF	GA	GD	Win %
SuperSport HNL	17 July 2022	28 May 2023	Matchday 1	2nd	36	21	8	7	65	41	+24	58.33
Croatian Cup	12 October 2022	24 May 2023	First Round	Winners	5	5	0	0	12	2	+10	100.00
Europa Conference League	4 August 2022	25 August 2022	Third qualifying round	Play-off round	4	1	0	3	5	8	−3	25.00
Croatian Super Cup	9 July 2022	9 July 2022	Final	Runners-up	1	0	1	0	0	0	+0	0.00
Total					46	27	9	10	82	51	+31	58.70

Last updated: 29 May 2023
Source: Soccerway

=== SuperSport HNL ===
==== Classification ====
Pos	Team	Pld	W	D	L	GF	GA	GD	Pts	Qualification or relegation
1	Dinamo Zagreb (C)	36	24	9	3	81	28	+53	81	Qualification for the Champions League second qualifying round
2	Hajduk Split	36	21	8	7	65	41	+24	71	Qualification to Europa Conference League third qualifying round (Note: Hajduk qualified for the Europa Conference League third qualifying round by winning the 2022–23 Croatian Football Cup.)
3	Osijek	36	13	11	12	46	41	+5	50	Qualification to Europa Conference League second qualifying round
4	Rijeka	36	14	7	15	44	44	0	49	Qualification to Europa Conference League second qualifying round
5	Istra 1961	36	11	13	12	36	38	−2	46	

Source: SuperSport HNL
Rules for classification: 1) Points; 2) Head-to-head points; 3) Head-to-head goal difference; 4) Head-to-head goals scored (at home if two teams tied); 5) Goal difference; 6) Goals scored; 7) Play-off
(Note: Criteria 2-4 and 7 is only used if deciding champion, teams to international competition or teams for relegation and in that case criteria 6 will not be used).
(C) Champions

==== Results summary ====
Overall								Home						Away					
Pld	W	D	L	GF	GA	GD	Pts	W	D	L	GF	GA	GD	W	D	L	GF	GA	GD
36	21	8	7	65	41	+24	71	12	4	2	39	18	+21	9	4	5	26	23	+3

Last updated: 29 May 2023.
Source: SuperSport HNL

==== Results by round ====
Round	1	2	3	4	5	6	7	8	9	10	11	12	13	14	15	16	17	18	19	20	21	22	23	24	25	26	27	28	29	30	31	32	33	34	35	36
Ground	A	H	A	H	A	H	A	H	A	H	A	H	A	H	A	H	A	H	A	H	A	H	A	H	A	H	A	H	A	H	A	H	A	H	A	H
Result	W	W	W	W	L	W	L	W	D	D	W	W	W	D	D	W	D	W	L	L	W	W	L	L	W	W	W	D	L	W	D	D	W	W	W	W
Position	1	2	2	1	2	2	2	2	2	2	2	2	2	2	2	2	2	2	2	2	2	2	2	2	2	2	2	2	2	2	2	2	2	2	2	2

Updated to match(es) played on 28 May 2023. Source: SuperSport HNL
A = Away; H = Home; W = Win; D = Draw; L = Loss

==== Results by opponent ====
Team	Results				Points
Team	1	2	3	4	Points
Dinamo Zagreb	1–4	1–1	0–4	0–0	2
Gorica	3–1	1–0	2–1	0–0	10
Istra 1961	2–0	2–2	0–3	2–2	5
Lokomotiva	2–1	2–2	3–4	3–0	7
Osijek	1–2	3–1	2–0	3–0	9
Rijeka	2–0	1–0	1–2	0–2	6
Slaven Belupo	5–1	2–2	1–0	1–0	10
Šibenik	1–1	2–1	3–2	3–0	10
Varaždin	2–0	2–1	4–1	2–0	12

Source: 2022–23 Croatian Football League article

== Matches ==
=== Friendlies ===
==== Pre-season ====
25 June 2022 Friendly	CFR Cluj (Romania)	2–0	(Croatia) Hajduk Split	Dietersdorf bei Fürstenfeld, Austria
18:00	Deac 39' (pen.); Manea 42'; Burcă (yellow card) 87'	Report	Krolo (yellow card) 69'	Stadium: Waldstadion Dietersdorf; Referee: Michael Steindl

29 June 2022 Friendly	HSV (Germany)	2–2	(Croatia) Hajduk Split	Fürstenfeld, Austria
17:30	Glatzel 33'; Königsdörffer 88'	Report	Livaja 28'; Ćubelić 68'	Stadium: Rudolf Gutmann Stadion; Referee: Rene Eisner

1 July 2022 Friendly	Gent (Belgium)	3–0	(Croatia) Hajduk Split	Friedberg, Austria
18:30	Cuypers 28'; Bruno 43', 49'	Report		Stadium: Sportplatz Friedberg; Referee: Thomas Paier

2 July 2022 Friendly	Kisvárda (Hungary)	1–1	(Croatia) Hajduk Split	Bad Blumau, Austria
10:30	Mešanović 29'	Report	Kačaniklić 50'; Diamantakos (penalty missed) 89'	Stadium: Safenstadion

==== On-season ====
21 July 2022 Friendly	Hajduk Split (Croatia)	0–2	(Bosnia and Herzegovina) Posušje	Split, Croatia
19:00		Report	Milanović; Pavković	Stadium: Stadion Poljud; Attendance: 0

26 July 2022 Friendly	Hajduk Split	6–2	Solin	Split, Croatia
17:00	Šarić 6'; Biuk 46', 47'; Atanasov 49'; Sahiti 60'; Livaja 90'	Report	Chinedu 20'; Prpić 37' (o.g.)	Stadium: Stadion Poljud; Attendance: 0

25 September 2022 Friendly	Urania Baška Voda	1–4	Hajduk Split	Baška Voda, Croatia
15:30	Barać 82'	Report	Vrcić 7'; Melnjak 9'; Krolo 47'; Kalik 86' (pen.); Đolonga (yellow card) 88'	Stadium: ŠC Ante Jurišić Ako; Attendance: 1,000; Referee: Ante Znaor (Podbablje)

27 September 2022 Friendly	Neretvanac Opuzen	1–2	Hajduk Split	Opuzen, Croatia
15:30	Vučković 34'	Report	Krovinović (yellow card) 23'; Jemo 79'; Duić 90'	Stadium: Stadion Podvornica; Attendance: 1,600; Referee: Matko Babić (Opuzen)

==== Mid-season ====
16 December 2022 Friendly	Hajduk Split (Croatia)	4–3	(Germany) Schalke 04	Split, Croatia
18:00	Ćubelić 24'; Awaziem (yellow card) 44'; Sahiti 47'; Biuk 61'; Vušković 72'; Vrcić (yellow card) 84'	Report	Polter 37'; Bülter 45' (pen.); Mollet (yellow card) 45+1'; Drexler (yellow card) 54'; Kozuki 74'; Latza (yellow card) 76'	Stadium: Stadion Poljud; Attendance: 3,000; Referee: Ante Terzić (Split)

21 December 2022 Friendly	Auxerre (France)	1–0	(Croatia) Hajduk Split	Auxerre, France
19:30	Niang 30'	Report		Stadium: Stade de l'Abbé Deschamps; Attendance: 2,305; Referee: Ali Djedid

7 January 2023 Friendly	Radomlje (Slovenia)	1–3	(Croatia) Hajduk Split	Poreč, Croatia
14:30	F. Čuić 54'; Pogačar (yellow card) 61'	Report	Livaja 3'; Krovinović 7'; Antunović 81'	Stadium: Zelena Laguna Football Camp; Referee: Antonio Melnjak

11 January 2023 Friendly	MOL Fehérvár (Hungary)	2–3 (Note: The game was played with 60 minute halves.)	(Croatia) Hajduk Split	Poreč, Croatia
14:00	Kodro 10' (pen.), 57'; Kastrati (yellow card) 70'; Kojnok (yellow card) 77'	Report	Livaja 7' (pen.), 13'; Sahiti 24'; Fossati (yellow card) 90'; Prpić (yellow card) 90'	Stadium: Zelena Laguna Football Camp; Referee: Marin Vidulin

14 January 2023 Friendly	Celje (Slovenia)	0–2	(Croatia) Hajduk Split	Poreč, Croatia
14:30		Report	Fossati 30'; Pukštas (yellow card) 44'; Vrcić 58'; Kalik (yellow card) 87'	Stadium: Zelena Laguna Football Camp; Referee: Antonio Melnjak

15 January 2023 Friendly	1. FC Slovácko (Czech Republic)	1–1	(Croatia) Hajduk Split	Poreč, Croatia
12:00	Kim 22'	Report	Krovinović 7'	Stadium: Zelena Laguna Football Camp; Referee: Marin Vidulin

=== Croatian Football Super Cup ===
9 July 2022 Final	Dinamo Zagreb	0–0 (4–1 p)	Hajduk Split	Zagreb
20:00 CEST (UTC+02:00)	Drmić (yellow card) 63'; Ademi (yellow card) 72'; Lauritsen (yellow card) 85'; Ljubičić (yellow card) 89'	Report	Mikanović (yellow card) 36'; Krovinović (yellow card) 41'; Simić (yellow card) 57'; Grgić (yellow card) 84'	Stadium: Stadion Maksimir; Attendance: 16,532; Referee: Igor Pajač (Sveti Ivan Zelina)
	Penalties
	Petković (penalty scored); Oršić (penalty scored); Ljubičić (penalty scored); Ivanušec (penalty scored)		(penalty scored) Livaja; (penalty missed) Mlakar; (penalty missed) Vuković

=== SuperSport HNL ===
17 July 2022 1	Istra 1961	0–2	Hajduk Split	Pula
21:00 CEST (UTC+02:00)	Hujber (yellow card) 15'; Maurić (yellow card) 18'; Mlinar (yellow card) 58'; Antovski (yellow card) 90+2'	Report	Melnjak 43'; Mlakar (yellow card) 55'; Livaja 61'	Stadium: Stadion Aldo Drosina; Attendance: 4,246; Referee: Tihomir Pejin (Donji Miholjac)

30 July 2022 3	Varaždin	0–2	Hajduk Split	Varaždin
21:00 CEST (UTC+02:00)	Teklić (yellow card) 45+1'; Pëllumbi (yellow card) 62'	Report	Livaja 29', 45+2' (yellow card) 88'	Stadium: Stadion Varteks; Attendance: 6,947; Referee: Ante Čulina (Zagreb)

13 August 2022 5	Dinamo Zagreb	4–1	Hajduk Split	Zagreb
21:05 CEST (UTC+02:00)	Baturina 61' (yellow card) 81'; Ademi 64'; Gojak 84'; Oršić 90+1'	Report	Grgić (yellow card) 16'; Atanasov 45+2' (yellow card) 45+2'; Livaja (yellow card) 59'	Stadium: Stadion Maksimir; Attendance: 14,031; Referee: Dario Bel (Osijek)

21 August 2022 6	Hajduk Split	2–1	Lokomotiva	Split
21:05 CEST (UTC+02:00)	Awaziem 33'; Mlakar (yellow card) 36'; Grgić 40'; Elez (yellow card) 59'; Mikanović (yellow card) 90'	Report	Mersinaj (yellow card) 4'; Smakaj (yellow card) 30'; Çokaj (yellow card) 50'; Kulenović 74' (pen.)	Stadium: Stadion Poljud; Attendance: 19,243; Referee: Tihomir Pejin (Donji Miholjac)

28 August 2022 7	Osijek	2–1	Hajduk Split	Osijek
21:05 CEST (UTC+02:00)	Leovac 23' (yellow card) 49'; Beljo 41' (pen.); Jugović (yellow card) 88'; Brlek (yellow card) 90+7'; Mance (yellow card) 90+10'	Report	Lovrencsics (yellow card) 43'; Sahiti (yellow card) 46'; Livaja 73' (pen.); Kalik (yellow card) 76'; Mikanović (yellow card) 79'; Awaziem (yellow card) 90'	Stadium: Stadion Gradski vrt Attendance: 7,820; Referee: Ante Čulina (Zagreb)

4 September 2022 8	Hajduk Split	5–1	Slaven Belupo	Split
21:05 CEST (UTC+02:00)	Mlakar 51'; Sahiti (yellow card) 53'; Čolina 60'; Atanasov 77'; Awaziem (yellow card) 79'; Kalinić 81', 90+2'	Report	Hoxha (yellow card) 33' (yellow-red card) 56' (goal) 43'	Stadium: Stadion Poljud; Attendance: 15,108; Referee: Fran Jović (Zagreb)

9 September 2022 9	Šibenik	1–1	Hajduk Split	Šibenik
20:00 CEST (UTC+02:00)	M. Matić (yellow card) 83'; Dolček 90+7'	Report	Čolina (yellow card) 14'; Fossati (yellow card) 31'; Mlakar 49'	Stadium: Stadion Šubićevac; Attendance: 2,578; Referee: Igor Pajač (Sveti Ivan Zelina)

14 September 2022 2	Hajduk Split	2–0	Rijeka	Split
16:30 CEST (UTC+02:00)	Awaziem (yellow card) 45'; Biuk 66'; N. Kalinić 76'; Mikanović (yellow card) 76'; Kalik (yellow card) 90'	Report	Vukčević (yellow card) 14'; Galešić (yellow card) 22'; Obregón (yellow card) 23'; Lunetta (yellow card) 76' (yellow-red card) 84'	Stadium: Stadion Poljud; Attendance: 13,687; Referee: Dario Bel (Osijek)

17 September 2022 10	Hajduk Split	2–2	Istra 1961	Split
19:05 CEST (UTC+02:00)	Lovrencsics (yellow card) 25'; Livaja 47', 88'; Kalik (yellow card) 82'; Sahiti (yellow card) 90+3'	Report	Erceg 52'; Boultam 64'; Kadušić (yellow card) 71'; Majkić (yellow card) 90+1'	Stadium: Stadion Poljud; Attendance: 12,976; Referee: Patrik Kolarić (Čakovec)

2 October 2022 11	Rijeka	0–1	Hajduk Split	Rijeka
15:00 CEST (UTC+02:00)	Lunetta (yellow card) 42'; Smolčić (yellow card) 45+2'; Krešić (yellow card) 49'; Vrančić (yellow card) 69'; Karrica (yellow card) 90+4'	Report	Awaziem (yellow card) 16' (goal) 51'; Fossati (yellow card) 45'; Kalik (yellow card) 46'; L. Kalinić (yellow card) 90'	Stadium: Stadion Rujevica; Attendance: 5,844; Referee: Igor Pajač (Sveti Ivan Zelina)

8 October 2022 12	Hajduk Split	2–1	Varaždin	Split
19:05 CEST (UTC+02:00)	Sahiti 33'; Fossati (yellow card) 40'; Lovrencsics (yellow card) 85'; Awaziem 90+8'	Report	Brodić 72'; Jelenić (yellow card) 87'; Puclin (yellow card) 89'; J. Stanić (yellow card) 90+8'	Stadium: Stadion Poljud; Attendance: 13,501; Referee: Ante Čulina (Zagreb)

15 October 2022 13	Gorica	0–1	Hajduk Split	Velika Gorica
19:05 CEST (UTC+02:00)	Krizmanić (yellow card) 25'; Wagué (red card) 49'; Pršir (yellow card) 49'; Vojtko (yellow card) 90+7'	Report	Livaja (penalty missed) 52' 90+8'	Stadium: Stadion Radnik; Attendance: 3,878; Referee: Dario Bel (Osijek)

21 October 2022 14	Hajduk Split	1–1	Dinamo Zagreb	Split
18:00 CEST (UTC+02:00)	Livaja 26'; Awaziem (yellow card) 70'; Subašić (yellow card) 71'	Report	Petković 72' (pen.); J. Šutalo (yellow card) 74'; Ljubičić (yellow card) 90+4'	Stadium: Stadion Poljud; Attendance: 32,600; Referee: Igor Pajač (Sveti Ivan Zelina)

26 October 2022 4	Hajduk Split	3–1	Gorica	Split
16:30 CEST (UTC+02:00)	Livaja 2', 59' (pen.) (penalty missed) 90+1' (yellow card) 12'; Sahiti (yellow card) 17'; Vuković (yellow card) 43'; Awaziem 72'	Report	Francois 9'; Korça (yellow card) 24' (red card) 85'; Jovičić (yellow card) 58'; Ndockyt (yellow card) 90'	Stadium: Stadion Poljud; Attendance: 12,219; Referee: Fran Jović (Zagreb)

30 October 2022 15	Lokomotiva	2–2	Hajduk Split	Zagreb
15:00 CET (UTC+01:00)	Mersinaj (yellow card) 38'; Milićević (yellow card) 44'; Tuci (yellow card) 71' (goal) 90+5'; Marić (yellow card) 78'; Aliyu 88'	Report	Mikanović (yellow card) 44'; Grgić (yellow card) 45'; Fossati (yellow card) 45+1'; Sahiti 61'; Mlakar 67'; Čolina (yellow card) 90+5'	Stadium: Stadion Kranjčevićeva; Attendance: 4,369; Referee: Zdenko Lovrić (Đakovo)

5 November 2022 16	Hajduk Split	3–1	Osijek	Split
17:30 CET (UTC+01:00)	Sahiti 10'; Livaja (yellow card) 32' (goal) 69' (pen.); Mlakar 79'	Report	Gržan (yellow card) 5'; Bralić (yellow card) 30'; Leovac 45'	Stadium: Stadion Poljud; Attendance: 9,720; Referee: Menelaos Antoniou (Cyprus)

12 November 2022 17	Slaven Belupo	2–2	Hajduk Split	Koprivnica
17:30 CET (UTC+01:00)	Hoxha 49' (yellow card) 89'; Bosec (yellow card) 53'; Krstanović 57' (pen.); Božić (yellow card) 88'	Report	Krovinović 12' (yellow card) 90+3'; Pukštas 28'; Livaja (yellow card) 35'; Simić (yellow card) 57'; Sahiti (yellow card) 65' (yellow-red card) 79'; Mikanović (yellow card) 90+3'	Stadium: Gradski Stadion Ivan Kušek Apaš; Attendance: 3,198; Referee: Ante Čulina (Zagreb)

22 January 2023 18	Hajduk Split	2–1	Šibenik	Split
15:00 CET (UTC+01:00)	Kalik 45'; Awaziem (yellow card) 60'; Livaja 85'	Report	Arai 13'; Mesa (yellow card) 42'	Stadium: Stadion Poljud; Attendance: 9,358; Referee: Tihomir Pejin (Donji Miholjac)

29 January 2023 19	Istra 1961	3–0	Hajduk Split	Pula
17:10 CET (UTC+01:00)	Erceg 29', 65'; Galilea 53'	Report	Prpić (yellow card) 14'; Simić (yellow card) 73'	Stadium: Stadion Aldo Drosina; Attendance: 4,785; Referee: Igor Pajač (Sveti Ivan Zelina)

5 February 2023 20	Hajduk Split	1–2	Rijeka	Split
17:30 CET (UTC+01:00)	Livaja 90' (pen.) (penalty missed) 90+6'	Report	Frigan (yellow card) 47' (goal) 83'; Ampem 65'; Janković (yellow card) 74'	Stadium: Stadion Poljud; Attendance: 13,098; Referee: Ante Čulina (Zagreb)

11 February 2023 21	Varaždin	1–4	Hajduk Split	Varaždin
15:00 CET (UTC+01:00)	Jelenić (yellow card) 44'; Brodić 51'; Elezi (red card) 53'	Report	Melnjak 47'; Awaziem (yellow card) 64'; Pukštas (yellow card) 69' (goal) 79', 90+2'; Livaja 77'	Stadium: Stadion Varteks; Attendance: 5,881; Referee: Dario Bel (Osijek)

19 February 2023 22	Hajduk Split	2–1	Gorica	Split
17:10 CET (UTC+01:00)	Anello (yellow card) 33'; Lovrencsics (yellow card) 36'; Livaja 58'; Fossati (yellow card) 63'; Prpić (yellow card) 68'; N. Kalinić 79'; Letaj (yellow card) 90+3'	Report	Steenvoorden (yellow card) 32'; Ndockyt (yellow card) 58'; Bralić 65'	Stadium: Stadion Poljud; Attendance: 12,362; Referee: Tihomir Pejin (Donji Miholjac)

26 February 2023 23	Dinamo Zagreb	4–0	Hajduk Split	Zagreb
15:00 CET (UTC+01:00)	Ademi 8'; Baturina 10'; Perić (yellow card) 30'; Ivanušec 38', 63'	Report	Mikanović (yellow card) 68'	Stadium: Stadion Maksimir; Attendance: 14,010; Referee: Dario Bel (Osijek)

5 March 2023 24	Hajduk Split	3–4	Lokomotiva	Split
15:00 CET (UTC+01:00)	Mlakar 40'; Livaja 66' (pen.); Benrahou (yellow card) 79' (goal) 89'; Krovinović (yellow card) 90+2'	Report	Bubanja 12' (yellow card) 78'; Stojković 28'; Marić (yellow card) 34'; Aliyu 83' 87'	Stadium: Stadion Poljud; Attendance: 13,499; Referee: Patrik Kolarić (Čakovec)

12 March 2023 25	Osijek	0–2	Hajduk Split	Osijek
17:30 CET (UTC+01:00)	Cheberko (yellow card) 27'; Škorić (yellow card) 86'	Report	Livaja 28' (pen.); Melnjak 35'; Benrahou (yellow card) 76'; Lučić (yellow card) 90+1'	Stadium: Stadion Gradski vrt Attendance: 6,107; Referee: Fran Jović (Zagreb)

18 March 2023 26	Hajduk Split	1–0	Slaven Belupo	Split
18:10 CET (UTC+01:00)	Vušković (yellow card) 48'; Grgić (yellow card) 64'; Mikanović 72'	Report	Jambor (yellow card) 63'	Stadium: Stadion Poljud; Attendance: 14,005; Referee: Dario Bel (Osijek)

1 April 2023 27	Šibenik	2–3	Hajduk Split	Šibenik
19:10 CEST (UTC+02:00)	Dolček 63'; Pozo (yellow card) 89'; Kvržić 90'	Report	Mikanović (yellow card) 25'; Livaja 45'; Mlakar 53'; Pukštas 59'; N. Kalinić (yellow card) 90+2'	Stadium: Stadion Šubićevac; Attendance: 2,718; Referee: Igor Pajač (Sveti Ivan Zelina)

7 April 2023 28	Hajduk Split	2–2	Istra 1961	Split
18:10 CEST (UTC+02:00)	Mlakar 2', 45+1'; Grgić (yellow card) 36'; Ferro (yellow card) 36'; Livaja (yellow card) 36'; Borevković (red card) 46'; Krovinović (yellow card) 90+7'	Report	Hujber 20'; Bakrar 21'; Marešić (yellow card) 39' (yellow-red card) 79'; Majkić (yellow card) 88'	Stadium: Stadion Poljud; Attendance: 14,966; Referee: Ante Čulina (Zagreb)

16 April 2023 29	Rijeka	2–0	Hajduk Split	Rijeka
18:00 CEST (UTC+02:00)	Frigan 9'; Marin 76'	Report	Pukštas (yellow card) 87'	Stadium: Stadion Rujevica; Attendance: 7,749; Referee: Igor Pajač (Sveti Ivan Zelina)

22 April 2023 30	Hajduk Split	2–0	Varaždin	Split
19:10 CEST (UTC+02:00)	Benrahou 25'; Borevković (yellow card) 47'; Sahiti 65'; Anello (yellow card) 90+1'	Report		Stadium: Stadion Poljud; Attendance: 10,596; Referee: Zdenko Lovrić (Đakovo)

26 April 2023 31	Gorica	0–0	Hajduk Split	Velika Gorica
19:10 CEST (UTC+02:00)	Pršir (yellow card) 15'; Banić (yellow card) 17'; Bralić (yellow card) 45+2'; Fućak (yellow card) 54'; Krizmanić (yellow card) 90+4'	Report	Benrahou (yellow card) 45+2'; Borevković (yellow card) 45+3'; Awaziem (yellow card) 65'; Anello (yellow card) 86'	Stadium: Stadion Radnik; Attendance: 3,516; Referee: Zdenko Lovrić (Đakovo)

30 April 2023 32	Hajduk Split	0–0	Dinamo Zagreb	Split
18:00 CEST (UTC+02:00)		Report		Stadium: Stadion Poljud; Attendance: 30,515; Referee: Dario Bel (Osijek)

7 May 2023 33	Lokomotiva	0–3	Hajduk Split	Zagreb
19:20 CEST (UTC+02:00)		Report	Benrahou 53'; Livaja 82'; Ćubelić 89'	Stadium: Stadion Kranjčevićeva; Attendance: 2,964; Referee: Patrik Kolarić (Čakovec)

13 May 2023 34	Hajduk Split	3–0	Osijek	Split
17:00 CEST (UTC+02:00)	Awaziem 25'; Melnjak 50'; Mlakar 62'	Report		Stadium: Stadion Poljud; Attendance: 10,009; Referee: Igor Pajač (Sv. Ivan Zelina)

19 May 2023 35	Slaven Belupo	0–1	Hajduk Split	Koprivnica
16:00 CEST (UTC+02:00)	Hlevnjak (yellow card) 57'	Report	Mlakar 37'	Stadium: Gradski Stadion Ivan Kušek Apaš; Attendance: 2,241; Referee: Dario Bel (Osijek)

28 May 2023 36	Hajduk Split	3–0	Šibenik	Split
17:00 CEST (UTC+02:00)	Brajković 54'; Mlakar 64'; Benrahou 77'	Report		Stadium: Stadion Poljud; Attendance: 18,753; Referee: Mateo Erceg (Benkovac)

=== Croatian Football Cup ===
12 October 2022 R1	Tehničar Cvetkovec	1–5	Hajduk Split	Cvetkovec
15:30 CEST (UTC+02:00)	Vrkić (yellow card) 53'; Hudak 69' (pen.)	Report	Vukonić 6' (o.g.); Mlakar 23', 25'; Dimitrov (red card) 34'; Vuković 61'; Šarić 65'; Atanasov (yellow card) 68'	Stadium: Stadion Cvetkovec; Attendance: 4,000; Referee: Ante Čuljak (Zagreb)

8 November 2022 R2	Mladost Ždralovi	0–2	Hajduk Split	Bjelovar
14:00 CET (UTC+01:00)	Brezina (yellow card) 22'; Bošnjak (yellow card) 43'; Baraban (penalty missed) 58'; Kožarić (yellow card) 66'; Jakšić (yellow card) 68'	Report	Mlakar 32'; Melnjak 38'; Awaziem (yellow card) 65'	Stadium: Gradski Stadion Bjelovar; Attendance: 3,000; Referee: Ante Čulina (Zagreb)

1 March 2023 QF	Osijek	1–2	Hajduk Split	Osijek
18:00 CET (UTC+01:00)	Škorić (yellow card) 75'; Živković 83'	Report	Vušković 21'; Krovinović 77'	Stadium: Stadion Gradski vrt Attendance: 4,727; Referee: Igor Pajač (Sv. Ivan Zelina)

12 April 2023 SF	Slaven Belupo	0–1	Hajduk Split	Koprivnica
17:30 CEST (UTC+02:00)	Jambor (yellow card) 56'; Soldo (yellow card) 60'; Mioč (yellow card) 85'	Report	Ferro (yellow card) 33'; Livaja 59' (pen.) (yellow card) 90+3'; Pukštas (yellow card) 88'	Stadium: Gradski Stadion Ivan Kušek Apaš; Attendance: 3,000; Referee: Patrik Kolarić (Čakovec)

24 May 2023 Final	Hajduk Split	2–0	Šibenik	Rijeka
19:00 CEST (UTC+02:00)	Melnjak 64'; Livaja 90+4' (pen.) (yellow card) 90+5'	Report	Čanađija (yellow card) 72'; Pozo (yellow card) 89'	Stadium: Stadion Rujevica; Attendance: 7,041; Referee: Igor Pajač (Sv. Ivan Zelina)

=== UEFA Europa Conference League ===
==== Third qualifying round ====
4 August 2022 First leg	Hajduk Split (Croatia)	3–1	(Portugal) Vitória de Guimarães	Split, Croatia
21:00 CEST (UTC+02:00)	Krovinović (yellow card) 23' (goal) 87'; Sahiti 67'; Melnjak 75'	Report	T. Silva (yellow card) 12'; Maga 61'; Semedo (yellow card) 72'	Stadium: Stadion Poljud; Attendance: 32,000; Referee: Mohammed Al-Hakim (Sweden)

10 August 2022 Second leg	Vitória de Guimarães (Portugal)	1–0 (2–3 agg.)	(Croatia) Hajduk Split	Guimarães, Portugal
17:00 WEST (UTC+01:00)	Anderson 5'; Amaro (yellow card) 42'; Varela (yellow card) 45'; T. Silva (yellow card) 45+1' (yellow-red card) 77'	Report	Livaja (yellow card) 37'; Simić (yellow card) 40'; Vuković (yellow card) 45'; Čolina (yellow card) 57'; Borevković (yellow card) 59'; Biuk (yellow card) 90'	Stadium: Estádio D. Afonso Henriques; Attendance: 15,214; Referee: Ali Palabıyık (Turkey)

==== Play-off round ====
18 August 2022 First leg	Villarreal (Spain)	4–2	(Croatia) Hajduk Split	Valencia, Spain
20:45 CEST (UTC+2)	Morales 15', 36'; Livaja 19' (o.g.); Baena (yellow card) 32'; G. Moreno 45+1'; Mandi (yellow card) 82'	Report	Biuk 2'; Livaja (yellow card) 13'; Sahiti (yellow card) 35'; Awaziem (yellow card) 73'; Fossati 85' (pen.); Lovrencsics (yellow card) 90+4'	Stadium: Ciutat de València; Attendance: 11,275; Referee: Aleksei Kulbakov (Belarus)

25 August 2022 Second leg	Hajduk Split (Croatia)	0–2 (2–6 agg.)	(Spain) Villarreal	Split, Croatia
21:00 CEST (UTC+02:00)	Mikanović (yellow card) 20'	Report	Coquelin (yellow card) 22'; Pedraza 37'; Chukwueze 56'; G. Moreno (yellow card) 77'; Cuenca (yellow card) 89'	Stadium: Stadion Poljud; Attendance: 30,000; Referee: Andris Treimanis (Latvia)

== Player seasonal records ==
Updated 29 May 2023

=== Goals ===
Rank	Name	League	Europe	Cup	Super Cup	Total
1	(Croatia) Marko Livaja	19	–	2	–	21
2	(Slovenia) Jan Mlakar	11	–	3	–	14
3	(Croatia) Dario Melnjak	4	1	2	–	7
4	(Nigeria) Chidozie Awaziem	5	–	–	–	5
4	(Kosovo) Emir Sahiti	4	1	–	–	5
6	(Morocco) Yassine Benrahou	4	–	–	–	4
6	(Croatia) Nikola Kalinić	4	–	–	–	4
6	(United States) Rokas Pukštas	4	–	–	–	4
9	(Croatia) Filip Krovinović	1	1	1	–	3
10	(North Macedonia) Jani Atanasov	2	–	–	–	2
10	(Croatia) Stipe Biuk	1	1	–	–	2
12	(Croatia) Roko Brajković	1	–	–	–	1
12	(Croatia) David Čolina	1	–	–	–	1
12	(Croatia) Ivan Ćubelić	1	–	–	–	1
12	(Austria) Lukas Grgić	1	–	–	–	1
12	(Australia) Anthony Kalik	1	–	–	–	1
12	(Croatia) Dino Mikanović	1	–	–	–	1
12	(Italy) Marco Fossati	–	1	–	–	1
12	(Croatia) Ivan Šarić	–	–	1	–	1
12	(Croatia) Josip Vuković	–	–	1	–	1
12	(Croatia) Luka Vušković	–	–	1	–	1
Own goals		–	–	1	–	1
TOTALS		65	5	12	0	82

Source: Competitive matches

=== Clean sheets ===
Rank	Name	League	Europe	Cup	Super Cup	Total
1	(Austria) Ivan Lučić	9	–	2	–	11
2	(Croatia) Lovre Kalinić	4	–	–	1	5
3	(Croatia) Karlo Sentić	3	–	1	–	4
4	(Croatia) Danijel Subašić	1	–	–	–	1
TOTALS		17	0	3	1	21

Source: Competitive matches

=== Disciplinary record ===
Number	Position	Player	HNL			Conference League			Croatian Cup			Croatian Super Cup			Total		
Number	Position	Player	Yellow card	(yellow card) (yellow-red card)	Red card	Yellow card	(yellow card) (yellow-red card)	Red card	Yellow card	(yellow card) (yellow-red card)	Red card	Yellow card	(yellow card) (yellow-red card)	Red card	Yellow card	(yellow card) (yellow-red card)	Red card
1	GK	(Croatia) Danijel Subašić	1	0	0	0	0	0	0	0	0	0	0	0	1	0	0
3	DF	(Croatia) David Čolina	2	0	0	1	0	0	0	0	0	0	0	0	3	0	0
3	DF	(Croatia) Dominik Prpić	2	0	0	0	0	0	0	0	0	0	0	0	2	0	0
4	DF	(Portugal) Ferro	1	0	0	0	0	0	1	0	0	0	0	0	2	0	0
4	MF	(Croatia) Josip Vuković	1	0	0	1	0	0	0	0	0	0	0	0	2	0	0
5	DF	(Croatia) Toni Borevković	2	0	1	1	0	0	0	0	0	0	0	0	3	0	1
6	MF	(Italy) Marco Fossati	5	0	0	0	0	0	0	0	0	0	0	0	5	0	0
7	MF	(Australia) Anthony Kalik	4	0	0	0	0	0	0	0	0	0	0	0	4	0	0
8	DF	(Czech Republic) Stefan Simić	2	0	0	1	0	0	0	0	0	1	0	0	4	0	0
9	FW	(Croatia) Nikola Kalinić	1	0	0	0	0	0	0	0	0	0	0	0	1	0	0
10	FW	(Croatia) Marko Livaja	6	0	0	2	0	0	2	0	0	0	0	0	10	0	0
11	MF	(Morocco) Yassine Benrahou	3	0	0	0	0	0	0	0	0	0	0	0	3	0	0
13	GK	(Austria) Ivan Lučić	1	0	0	0	0	0	0	0	0	0	0	0	1	0	0
14	MF	(Austria) Lukas Grgić	4	0	0	0	0	0	0	0	0	1	0	0	5	0	0
15	DF	(Bulgaria) Kristian Dimitrov	0	0	0	0	0	0	0	0	1	0	0	0	0	0	1
19	DF	(Croatia) Josip Elez	1	0	0	0	0	0	0	0	0	0	0	0	1	0	0
20	MF	(United States) Agustin Anello	3	0	0	0	0	0	0	0	0	0	0	0	3	0	0
20	MF	(North Macedonia) Jani Atanasov	1	0	0	0	0	0	1	0	0	0	0	0	2	0	0
21	MF	(United States) Rokas Pukštas	2	0	0	0	0	0	1	0	0	0	0	0	3	0	0
23	MF	(Croatia) Filip Krovinović	3	0	0	1	0	0	0	0	0	1	0	0	5	0	0
24	DF	(Croatia) Dino Mikanović	7	0	0	1	0	0	0	0	0	1	0	0	9	0	0
25	DF	(Nigeria) Chidozie Awaziem	8	0	0	1	0	0	1	0	0	0	0	0	10	0	0
26	DF	(Hungary) Gergő Lovrencsics	4	0	0	1	0	0	0	0	0	0	0	0	5	0	0
27	FW	(Croatia) Stipe Biuk	0	0	0	1	0	0	0	0	0	0	0	0	1	0	0
29	FW	(Slovenia) Jan Mlakar	2	0	0	0	0	0	0	0	0	0	0	0	2	0	0
33	DF	(Kosovo) Elvis Letaj	1	0	0	0	0	0	0	0	0	0	0	0	1	0	0
44	DF	(Croatia) Luka Vušković	1	0	0	0	0	0	0	0	0	0	0	0	1	0	0
77	MF	(Kosovo) Emir Sahiti	4	1	0	1	0	0	0	0	0	0	0	0	5	1	0
91	GK	(Croatia) Lovre Kalinić	1	0	0	0	0	0	0	0	0	0	0	0	1	0	0
TOTALS			73	1	1	12	0	0	6	0	1	4	0	0	95	1	2

=== Appearances and goals ===
Number	Position	Player	Apps	Goals	Apps	Goals	Apps	Goals	Apps	Goals	Apps	Goals
Number	Position	Player	Total		HNL (Note: First number represents appearances in starting eleven, while the second number indicates a substitute appearance.)		Conference League		Croatian Cup		Croatian Super Cup	
1	GK	(Croatia) Danijel Subašić	1	0	1+0	0	0+0	0	0+0	0	0+0	0
3	DF	(Croatia) David Čolina	16	1	6+7	1	1+2	0	0+0	0	0+0	0
3	DF	(Croatia) Dominik Prpić	7	0	4+1	0	0+0	0	1+1	0	0+0	0
4	DF	(Portugal) Ferro	11	0	9+0	0	0+0	0	2+0	0	0+0	0
4	MF	(Croatia) Josip Vuković	17	1	6+5	0	2+1	0	1+1	1	1+0	0
5	DF	(Croatia) Toni Borevković	18	0	13+2	0	1+1	0	0+0	0	1+0	0
6	MF	(Italy) Marco Fossati	33	1	21+6	0	1+1	1	2+2	0	0+0	0
7	MF	(Australia) Anthony Kalik	9	1	5+3	1	0+0	0	1+0	0	0+0	0
8	DF	(Czech Republic) Stefan Simić	22	0	11+5	0	2+1	0	1+1	0	1+0	0
9	FW	(Croatia) Nikola Kalinić	20	4	3+15	4	0+1	0	0+0	0	1+0	0
10	FW	(Croatia) Marko Livaja	43	21	33+1	19	4+0	0	4+0	2	1+0	0
11	MF	(Morocco) Yassine Benrahou	19	4	11+6	4	0+0	0	2+0	0	0+0	0
11	FW	(Nigeria) Samuel Eduok	1	0	0+0	0	0+0	0	0+1	0	0+0	0
13	GK	(Austria) Ivan Lučić	16	0	12+1	0	0+0	0	3+0	0	0+0	0
14	MF	(Austria) Lukas Grgić	33	1	17+9	1	4+0	0	2+0	0	1+0	0
15	DF	(Bulgaria) Kristian Dimitrov	1	0	0+0	0	0+0	0	1+0	0	0+0	0
17	DF	(Croatia) Dario Melnjak	45	7	33+2	4	4+0	1	5+0	2	1+0	0
18	FW	(Croatia) Ivan Šarić	3	1	0+1	0	0+0	0	0+2	1	0+0	0
19	DF	(Croatia) Josip Elez	16	0	9+2	0	4+0	0	0+0	0	0+1	0
20	MF	(United States) Agustin Anello	13	0	4+7	0	0+0	0	0+2	0	0+0	0
20	MF	(North Macedonia) Jani Atanasov	16	2	3+8	2	0+3	0	2+0	0	0+0	0
21	MF	(United States) Rokas Pukštas	26	4	15+6	4	0+0	0	5+0	0	0+0	0
22	MF	(Croatia) Ivan Krolo	6	0	0+4	0	0+0	0	0+2	0	0+0	0
23	MF	(Croatia) Filip Krovinović	44	3	33+2	1	4+0	1	4+0	1	1+0	0
24	DF	(Croatia) Dino Mikanović	30	1	14+10	1	4+0	0	1+0	0	1+0	0
25	DF	(Nigeria) Chidozie Awaziem	36	5	24+4	5	2+2	0	3+1	0	0+0	0
26	DF	(Hungary) Gergő Lovrencsics	25	0	11+7	0	0+4	0	2+1	0	0+0	0
27	FW	(Croatia) Stipe Biuk	22	2	14+1	1	3+1	1	2+0	0	1+0	0
28	MF	(Croatia) Roko Brajković	5	1	1+4	1	0+0	0	0+0	0	0+0	0
29	FW	(Slovenia) Jan Mlakar	41	14	24+9	11	0+2	0	5+0	3	0+1	0
30	GK	(Croatia) Karlo Sentić	18	0	14+2	0	0+0	0	2+0	0	0+0	0
33	DF	(Kosovo) Elvis Letaj	4	0	1+3	0	0+0	0	0+0	0	0+0	0
34	MF	(Croatia) Marko Capan	5	0	3+1	0	0+0	0	0+1	0	0+0	0
35	FW	(Croatia) Jere Vrcić	1	0	0+0	0	0+0	0	0+1	0	0+0	0
42	DF	(Croatia) Niko Đolonga	1	0	0+1	0	0+0	0	0+0	0	0+0	0
43	DF	(Canada) Niko Sigur	8	0	7+0	0	0+0	0	1+0	0	0+0	0
44	DF	(Croatia) Luka Vušković	11	1	7+1	0	0+0	0	2+1	1	0+0	0
77	MF	(Kosovo) Emir Sahiti	33	5	20+7	4	4+0	1	1+0	0	0+1	0
88	MF	(Croatia) Ivan Ćubelić	11	1	0+11	1	0+0	0	0+0	0	0+0	0
91	GK	(Croatia) Lovre Kalinić	14	0	9+0	0	4+0	0	0+0	0	1+0	0

== Transfers ==
=== In ===
Date	Position	Player	From	Fee
20 June 2022	DF	(Croatia) Toni Borevković	(Portugal) Vitória de Guimarães	Loan
30 June 2022	DF	(Croatia) Mario Vušković	(Germany) Hamburger SV	Loan ended
30 June 2022	MF	(Croatia) Darko Nejašmić	(Croatia) Osijek	Loan ended
30 June 2022	DF	(Bulgaria) Kristian Dimitrov	(Romania) CFR Cluj	Loan ended
30 June 2022	MF	(Croatia) Tonio Teklić	(Croatia) Varaždin	Loan ended
30 June 2022	MF	(Croatia) Mario Čuić	(Slovenia) Radomlje	Loan ended
30 June 2022	MF	(Croatia) Ivan Dolček	(Portugal) Famalicão	Loan ended
30 June 2022	MF	(Albania) Mark Bushaj	Croatia Zmijavci	Loan ended
30 June 2022	MF	(Croatia) Tino Blaž Lauš	(Bosnia and Herzegovina) Posušje	Loan ended
30 June 2022	MF	(Croatia) Jakov Blagaić	(Bosnia and Herzegovina) Široki Brijeg	Loan ended
30 June 2022	DF	(Croatia) Ante Bekavac	Croatia Zmijavci	Loan ended
30 June 2022	MF	(Croatia) Bruno Jenjić	(Croatia) Dugopolje	Loan ended
30 June 2022	GK	(Croatia) Vice Baždarić	(Croatia) Cibalia	Loan ended
30 June 2022	DF	(Croatia) Tvrtko Buljan	(Croatia) Solin	Loan ended
30 June 2022	FW	(Greece) Dimitrios Diamantakos	(Israel) Ashdod	Loan ended
30 June 2022	DF	(Croatia) Ivan Ćalušić	(Slovenia) Radomlje	Loan ended
30 June 2022	FW	(Croatia) Ivan Šarić	(Slovenia) Radomlje	Loan ended
30 June 2022	MF	(Croatia) Dino Skorup	(Croatia) Šibenik	Loan ended
30 June 2022	FW	(Croatia) Michele Šego	(Croatia) Varaždin	Loan ended
30 June 2022	GK	(Croatia) Karlo Sentić	(Croatia) Varaždin	Loan ended
30 June 2022	DF	(Croatia) Luka Škaričić	(Croatia) Varaždin	Loan ended
30 June 2022	MF	(Croatia) Ivan Ćubelić	(Croatia) Dugopolje	Loan ended
1 July 2022	GK	(Croatia) Lovre Kalinić	(England) Aston Villa	Free
1 August 2022	DF	(Nigeria) Chidozie Awaziem	(Portugal) Boavista	Loan
22 August 2022	DF	(Croatia) Ivan Ćalušić	(Slovenia) Radomlje	Recalled from loan
26 August 2022	MF	(Australia) Anthony Kalik	(Croatia) Gorica	300,000 €
25 November 2022	MF	(Croatia) Ivan Ćubelić	(Croatia) Varaždin	Recalled from loan
30 November 2022	GK	(Austria) Ivan Lučić	(Croatia) Istra 1961	Free
23 December 2022	FW	(Croatia) Marin Ljubičić	(Austria) LASK Linz	Loan ended
10 January 2023	DF	(Kosovo) Elvis Letaj	(Slovenia) Tabor Sežana	Recalled from loan
17 January 2023	MF	(Croatia) Tino Blaž Lauš	(Croatia) Istra 1961	Recalled from loan
23 January 2023	MF	(Croatia) Franjo Lazar	(Croatia) Jarun	Recalled from loan
26 January 2023	MF	(Morocco) Yassine Benrahou	(France) Nîmes Olympique	Free
13 February 2023	MF	(United States) Agustin Anello	(Belgium) Lommel	Loan
15 February 2023	DF	(Portugal) Ferro	(Portugal) Benfica	500,000 €
25 April 2023	MF	(Croatia) Ivan Krolo	(Croatia) Šibenik	Recalled from loan

Total Spending: ▼800,000 €

=== Out ===
Date	Position	Player	To	Fee
15 June 2022	GK	(Croatia) Josip Posavec	(Denmark) Aalborg	Free (released)
28 June 2022	FW	(Croatia) Marin Ljubičić	(Austria) LASK Linz	Loan
30 June 2022	DF	(Portugal) Ferro	(Portugal) Benfica	Loan ended
30 June 2022	GK	(Croatia) Lovre Kalinić	(England) Aston Villa	Loan ended
30 June 2022	DF	(Croatia) Nikola Katić	(Scotland) Rangers	Loan ended
1 July 2022	GK	(Croatia) Vice Baždarić	(Slovenia) Rogaška	End of contract
1 July 2022	DF	(Croatia) Ante Bekavac	Croatia Zmijavci	End of contract
1 July 2022	DF	(Croatia) Ivan Dolček	(Croatia) Šibenik	Loan
1 July 2022	DF	(Croatia) Luka Škaričić	(Croatia) Varaždin	Loan
1 July 2022	DF	(Croatia) Mario Vušković	(Germany) Hamburger SV	3,000,000 €
1 July 2022	MF	(Croatia) Marko Brkljača	(Croatia) Dinamo Zagreb	End of contract
1 July 2022	MF	(Albania) Mark Bushaj	Croatia Zmijavci	End of contract
1 July 2022	MF	(Croatia) Ivan Ćalušić	(Slovenia) Radomlje	Loan
1 July 2022	MF	(Croatia) Bruno Jenjić	(Croatia) Junak Sinj	End of contract
1 July 2022	MF	(Croatia) Tino Blaž Lauš	(Croatia) Istra 1961	Loan
1 July 2022	MF	(Croatia) Darko Nejašmić	(Croatia) Osijek	1,250,000 €
1 July 2022	MF	(Croatia) Dino Skorup	(Croatia) Šibenik	Free (released)
1 July 2022	MF	(Croatia) Tonio Teklić	(Croatia) Varaždin	Free (released)
1 July 2022	FW	(Croatia) Michele Šego	(Croatia) Varaždin	Free (released)
7 July 2022	MF	(Croatia) Mario Čuić	(Slovenia) Radomlje	Loan
7 July 2022	MF	(Bosnia and Herzegovina) Madžid Šošić	(Slovenia) Radomlje	Loan
14 July 2022	MF	(Croatia) Franjo Lazar	(Croatia) Jarun	Loan
19 July 2022	FW	(Sweden) Alexander Kačaniklić	(Cyprus) AEL Limassol	Free (released)
20 July 2022	DF	(Kosovo) Elvis Letaj	(Slovenia) Tabor Sežana	Loan
26 July 2022	GK	(Croatia) Ivan Perić	(Croatia) Rudeš	Free
1 August 2022	GK	(Croatia) Toni Silić	(Croatia) Dugopolje	Loan
5 August 2022	DF	(Croatia) Ivan Dominić	(Croatia) Solin	Dual registration
5 August 2022	MF	(United States) Rokas Pukštas	(Croatia) Solin	Dual registration
24 August 2022	FW	(Greece) Dimitrios Diamantakos	(India) Kerala Blasters	Free (released)
26 August 2022	FW	(Bosnia and Herzegovina) Filip Čuić	(Slovenia) Radomlje	Loan
31 August 2022	MF	(Croatia) Jakov Blagaić	(Bosnia and Herzegovina) Borac BL	Free (released)
31 August 2022	MF	(Croatia) Ivan Ćubelić	(Croatia) Varaždin	Loan
19 December 2022	MF	(Croatia) Ivan Krolo	(Croatia) Šibenik	Loan
23 December 2022	FW	(Croatia) Marin Ljubičić	(Austria) LASK Linz	2,900,000 €
30 December 2022	DF	(Bulgaria) Kristian Dimitrov	(Bulgaria) Levski Sofia	Free (released)
30 December 2022	FW	(Croatia) Stipe Biuk	(United States) Los Angeles FC	6,500,000 €
30 December 2022	FW	(Croatia) Ivan Šarić	(Slovenia) Mura	Undisclosed
4 January 2023	MF	(Croatia) Josip Vuković	(Saudi Arabia) Al Faisaly	Loan (fee: 100,000 €)
14 January 2023	DF	(Croatia) David Čolina	(Germany) Augsburg	650,000 €
14 January 2023	DF	(Croatia) Ivan Dominić	(Finland) KuPS	Loan
19 January 2023	FW	(Nigeria) Samuel Eduok		Free (released)
23 January 2023	MF	(North Macedonia) Jani Atanasov	(Poland) Cracovia	420,000 €
10 February 2023	MF	(Croatia) Franjo Lazar	(Croatia) Orijent	Loan
21 February 2023	MF	(Croatia) Tino Blaž Lauš	(Bosnia and Herzegovina) Velež Mostar	Loan

Total Income: ▲14,820,000 €

Total expenditure: ▲14,020,000 €

=== Promoted from youth squad ===
Position	Player	Age
MF	(Croatia) Ivan Krolo	19
DF	(Kosovo) Elvis Letaj	19
MF	(Croatia) Marko Capan	18
DF	(Croatia) Dominik Prpić	18
MF	(United States) Rokas Pukštas	18
FW	(Croatia) Roko Brajković	17
DF	(Croatia) Luka Vušković	16
DF	(Canada) Niko Sigur	19
