= 2022 Croatian Football Super Cup =

Dinamo Zagreb	Hajduk Split
0	0
- Dinamo Zagreb won 4–1 on penalties
- Date: 9 July 2022
- Venue: Stadion Maksimir, Zagreb
- Man of the Match: Lovre Kalinić (Hajduk Split)
- Referee: Igor Pajač
- Attendance: 16,532

The 2022 Croatian Football Super Cup was the thirteenth edition of the Croatian Football Super Cup, a football match contested by the winners of the Croatian First League and Croatian Football Cup. The match was played on 9 July 2022 at Stadion Maksimir in Zagreb between the 2021–22 Croatian First League winners Dinamo Zagreb and the 2021–22 Croatian Football Cup winners Hajduk Split.

== Match details ==
9 July 2022
20:00 UTC+2

Dinamo Zagreb	0–0	Hajduk Split
	Report
Penalties
Petković (penalty scored); Oršić (penalty scored); Ljubičić (penalty scored); Ivanušec (penalty scored)	4–1	(penalty scored) Livaja; (penalty missed) Mlakar; (penalty missed) Vuković

Stadion Maksimir, Zagreb
Attendance: 16,532
Referee: Igor Pajač (Sveti Ivan Zelina)

Dinamo Zagreb	Hajduk Split

GK	40	(Croatia) Dominik Livaković
RB	2	(Iran) Sadegh Moharrami
CB	6	(Denmark) Rasmus Lauritsen	(yellow card) 85'
CB	55	(Croatia) Dino Perić
LB	14	(Austria) Robert Ljubičić	(yellow card) 89'
RM	77	(Croatia) Dario Špikić		(substituted off) 86'
CM	5	(North Macedonia) Arijan Ademi (c)	(yellow card) 72'	(substituted off) 77'
CM	27	(Croatia) Josip Mišić
LM	7	(Croatia) Luka Ivanušec
CF	10	(Croatia) Bruno Petković
CF	18	(Switzerland) Josip Drmić	(yellow card) 63'	(substituted off) 66'
Substitutes:
GK	1	(Croatia) Danijel Zagorac
DF	66	(Austria) Emir Dilaver
DF	13	(North Macedonia) Stefan Ristovski
DF	28	(France) Kévin Théophile-Catherine
MF	12	(Croatia) Petar Bočkaj
MF	8	(Bosnia and Herzegovina) Amer Gojak
MF	70	(Bosnia and Herzegovina) Luka Menalo		(substituted on) 86'
MF	24	(Croatia) Marko Tolić
MF	46	(Croatia) Martin Baturina		(substituted on) 77'
MF	20	(Croatia) Antonio Marin
FW	39	(Australia) Deni Jurić
FW	99	(Croatia) Mislav Oršić		(substituted on) 66'
Manager:
(Croatia) Ante Čačić

GK	91	(Croatia) Lovre Kalinić (c)
RB	24	(Croatia) Dino Mikanović	(yellow card) 36'	(substituted off) 90+1'
CB	5	(Croatia) Toni Borevković
CB	8	(Czech Republic) Stefan Simić	(yellow card) 57'
LB	17	(Croatia) Dario Melnjak
DM	14	(Austria) Lukas Grgić	(yellow card) 84'
CM	4	(Croatia) Josip Vuković
CM	27	(Croatia) Stipe Biuk		(substituted off) 58'
AM	23	(Croatia) Filip Krovinović	(yellow card) 41'
CF	9	(Croatia) Nikola Kalinić
CF	10	(Croatia) Marko Livaja
Substitutes:
GK	1	(Croatia) Danijel Subašić
GK	30	(Croatia) Karlo Sentić
DF	19	(Croatia) Josip Elez		(substituted on) 90+1'
DF	3	(Croatia) David Čolina
DF	15	(Bulgaria) Kristian Dimitrov
DF	26	(Hungary) Gergő Lovrencsics
DF	31	(Croatia) Dominik Prpić
MF	77	(Kosovo) Emir Sahiti		(substituted on) 58'
MF	20	(North Macedonia) Jani Atanasov
MF	22	(Croatia) Ivan Krolo
MF	88	(Croatia) Ivan Ćubelić
FW	29	(Slovenia) Jan Mlakar		(substituted on) 70'
Manager:
(Lithuania) Valdas Dambrauskas

Assistant referees:
Goran Pataki (Đakovo)
Marjan Tomas (Osijek)
Fourth official:
Mario Zebec (Cestica)
Additional assistant referees:

Match rules

- 90 minutes.
- 30 minutes of extra-time if necessary.
- Penalty shoot-out if scores still level.
- Seven named substitutes.
- Maximum of three substitutions.
