= Marco Fossati =

Italian footballer (born 1992)

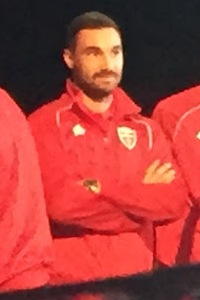
- Fossati in 2019

Personal information
- Full name: Marco Ezio Fossati
- Date of birth: 5 October 1992 (age 34)
- Place of birth: Monza, Italy
- Height: 1.80 m (5 ft 11 in)
- Position: Midfielder

Team information
- Current team: Trento
- Number: 6

Youth career
- 2001–2002: Cimiano
- 2002–2007: AC Milan
- 2007–2010: Inter Milan
- 2010–2011: AC Milan

Senior career*
Years	Team	Apps	(Gls)
2011–2015	AC Milan	0	(0)
2011–2012	→ Latina (loan)	22	(3)
2012–2013	→ Ascoli (loan)	34	(4)
2013–2014	→ Bari (loan)	23	(0)
2014–2015	→ Perugia (loan)	33	(3)
2015–2017	Cagliari	36	(1)
2016–2017	→ Hellas Verona (loan)	37	(2)
2017–2019	Hellas Verona	17	(0)
2019–2021	Monza	45	(3)
2021	→ Hajduk Split (loan)	13	(0)
2021–2023	Hajduk Split	53	(1)
2023–2024	Universitatea Cluj	11	(0)
2024–2025	AlbinoLeffe	34	(3)
2025–	Trento	30	(1)

International career
2008–2009	Italy U17	18	(0)
2009	Italy U18	2	(0)
2012–2013	Italy U20	9	(1)
2013	Italy U21	5	(0)
- * Club domestic league appearances and goals as of 29 April 2026

Marco Ezio Fossati (born 5 October 1992) is an Italian professional footballer who plays as a midfielder for Serie C Group A club Trento.

== Club career ==
=== Early career ===
Born in Monza, in the Milan metropolitan area, Fossati started playing football as a child with amateur team Cimiano in 2001, before joining A.C. Milan's youth system at the start of the 2002–03 season. Five years later he left for city rival Internazionale, where he went on to spend three seasons, playing for the Allievi (under-17) and Primavera (under-20) sides, as well as making three appearances with the first team in friendly matches. However, in July 2010 Fossati was transferred back to Milan, along with Attila Filkor and Cristian Daminuţă, for a total fee of €7 million. He spent the 2010–11 season playing for Milan's Primavera (under-20) side.

=== Loan spells (2011–2015) ===
At the start of the 2011–12 season Fossati was sent out on loan to Lega Pro Prima Divisione club Latina, making his official debut for the club on 4 September 2011, in a 1–1 draw against Siracusa. He went on to score two goals in 22 league appearances. The following season, Fossati joined Serie B side Ascoli on another loan spell. For the 2013–14 campaign he moved to Bari, another Serie B club, once again on a loan deal.

=== Cagliari ===
On 24 June 2015, Fossati joined Cagliari on a three-year contract. After a season he left the club.

=== Verona ===
On 8 June 2016, Fossati was signed by Verona on loan, with an obligation to sign. As part of the deal, goalkeeper Rafael moved to opposite direction in a definitive deal. On 20 June 2017, Cagliari confirmed the selling of Fossati to Verona outright.

=== Monza ===
On 5 January 2019, he signed a one-and-a-half-year contract with Monza.

=== Hajduk Split ===
On 11 February 2021, Fossati was sent on a six-month loan to Croatian First Football League side HNK Hajduk Split. He joined Hajduk Split permanently on 31 August.

=== Universitatea Cluj ===
On 23 September 2023, Fossati joined Romanian Liga I club Universitatea Cluj.

=== Return to Italy ===
On 23 August 2024, Fossati signed with AlbinoLeffe in Serie C.

== International career ==
Fossati started his youth international career in a training camp for players born in 1992 and 1993. He then played his first match in Saarland quadrangular tournament. He played all three matches in 2009 U-17 Euro qualifying, and all three matches in the elite round. In the final round Azzurrini lost to Germany in the semi-final, but still qualified for 2009 FIFA U-17 World Cup. At the World Junior Cup, he played all five matches. After a call-up to Italy U-19 team in September 2010, he never received a call-up again.

Fossati returned to international teams from 2012 to 2013.

== Career statistics ==
As of 7 May 2025

Club	Season	League			Cup		Continental		Other		Total	
Club	Season	Division	Apps	Goals	Apps	Goals	Apps	Goals	Apps	Goals	Apps	Goals
Latina (loan)	2011–12	Lega Pro Prima Divisione	22	3	1 (Note: Appearances in Coppa Italia Lega Pro)	0	—		1 (Note: Appearances in Lega Pro Prima Divisione-Relegation play-offs)	0	24	3
Ascoli (loan)	2012–13	Serie B	34	4	2	0	—		—		36	4
Bari (loan)	2013–14	Serie B	23	0	1	0	—		3 (Note: Appearances in Serie B-Promotion play-offs)	0	27	0
Perugia (loan)	2014–15	Serie B	33	3	2	0	—		1	0	36	3
Cagliari	2015–16	Serie B	36	1	1	0	—		—		37	1
Hellas Verona (loan)	2016–17	Serie B	37	2	2	1	—		—		39	3
Hellas Verona	2017–18	Serie A	17	0	2	0	—		—		19	0
Hellas Verona	Total		54	2	4	1	—		—		58	3
Monza	2018–19	Serie C	13	1	3 (Note: Appearances in Coppa Italia Serie C)	0	—		1 (Note: Appearances in Serie C-Promotion play-offs)	0	17	1
Monza	2019–20	Serie C	22	2	2	0	—		—		24	2
Monza	2020–21	Serie B	10	0	3	0	—		—		13	0
Monza	Total		45	3	8	0	—		1	0	54	3
Hajduk Split (loan)	2020–21	Prva HNL	13	0	2	0	—		—		15	0
Hajduk Split	2021–22	Prva HNL	26	1	4	0	—		—		30	1
Hajduk Split	2022–23	Prva HNL	27	0	4	0	2	1	0	0	33	1
Hajduk Split	Total		66	1	10	0	2	1	0	0	78	2
Universitatea Cluj	2023–24	Liga I	11	0	2	1	—		—		13	1
AlbinoLeffe	2024–25	Serie C	34	3	0	0	—		1	0	35	3
Career total			358	17	31	2	2	1	7	0	398	20

== Honours ==
Cagliari

- Serie B: 2015–16

Monza

- Serie C Group A: 2019–20
- Coppa Italia Serie C runner-up: 2018–19

Hajduk Split

- Croatian Cup: 2021–22, 2022–23
- Croatian Super Cup runner-up: 2022

Individual

- 2009 UEFA European Under-17 Championship Team of the Tournament
