= Dominik Prpić =

Croatian footballer (born 2004)

Personal information
- Date of birth: 19 May 2004 (age 22)
- Place of birth: Zagreb, Croatia
- Height: 1.88 m (6 ft 2 in)
- Position: Centre-back

Team information
- Current team: Porto
- Number: 21

Youth career
- 2010–2017: Zagreb
- 2017: Lokomotiva
- 2017–2022: Hajduk Split

Senior career*
Years	Team	Apps	(Gls)
2022–2025	Hajduk Split	44	(0)
2023–2024	→ Radomlje (loan)	12	(0)
2025–	Porto	6	(0)

International career^{‡}
2019	Croatia U15	2	(0)
2021–2022	Croatia U18	6	(0)
2022	Croatia U19	5	(1)
2024–	Croatia U21	10	(0)
- * Club domestic league appearances and goals as of 16:12, 8 December 2025 (UTC) ‡ National team caps and goals as of 16:12, 10 May 2026 (UTC)

Dominik Prpić (born 19 May 2004) is a Croatian professional footballer who plays as a centre-back for Primeira Liga club Porto.

== Club career ==
Prpić started playing football at the age of six at Zagreb, until early 2017, when he moved to Lokomotiva, but, having been scouted by Hajduk Split, he moved to the Dalmatian club that same summer. At Hajduk, he featured regularly for his generation in the following years, and, on 2 June 2022, had his contract with the club extended until the summer of 2025. He was subsequently added to the senior team. He made his league debut coming in for Stefan Simić in the 2–2 away draw with Slaven Belupo on 12 November 2022. His first game in the starting lineup was the 2–1 win against Šibenik on 22 January 2023.

On 10 July 2025, Prpić moved to Portuguese Primeira Liga club Porto, signing a five-year contract, for a transfer fee of €4.5 million, which could rise to €5.5 million with add-ons, and Hajduk Split keeping a 10% sell-on fee. His release clause was set at €60 million. He made his debut a month later, coming off the bench to replace Jan Bednarek in a 3–0 league victory over Vitória de Guimarães at the Estádio do Dragão.

== Personal life ==
Prpić is from Zagreb, with roots from Lika, Dalmatia and Dubrovnik.

== Career statistics ==
As of match played 10 May 2026

Appearances and goals by club, season and competition
Club	Season	League			National cup (Note: Includes Croatian Cup, Slovenian Cup and Taça de Portugal)		League cup (Note: Includes Taça da Liga)		Europe		Other		Total	
Club	Season	Division	Apps	Goals	Apps	Goals	Apps	Goals	Apps	Goals	Apps	Goals	Apps	Goals
Hajduk Split	2022–23	Croatian Football League	5	0	2	0	—		—		0	0	7	0
Hajduk Split	2023–24	Croatian Football League	9	0	1	0	—		—		—		10	0
Hajduk Split	2024–25	Croatian Football League	30	0	1	0	—		2 (Note: Appearances in UEFA Conference League)	0	—		33	0
Hajduk Split	Total		44	0	4	0	—		2	0	—		50	0
Radomlje (loan)	2023–24	1. SNL	12	0	1	0	—		—		—		13	0
Porto	2025–26	Primeira Liga	6	0	3	0	1	0	2 (Note: Appearances in UEFA Europa League)	0	—		12	0
Career total			62	0	8	0	1	0	4	0	0	0	75	0

== Honours ==
Hajduk Split

- Croatian Cup: 2022–23

Porto

- Primeira Liga: 2025–26
