= Robert Ljubičić =

Croatian footballer (born 1999)

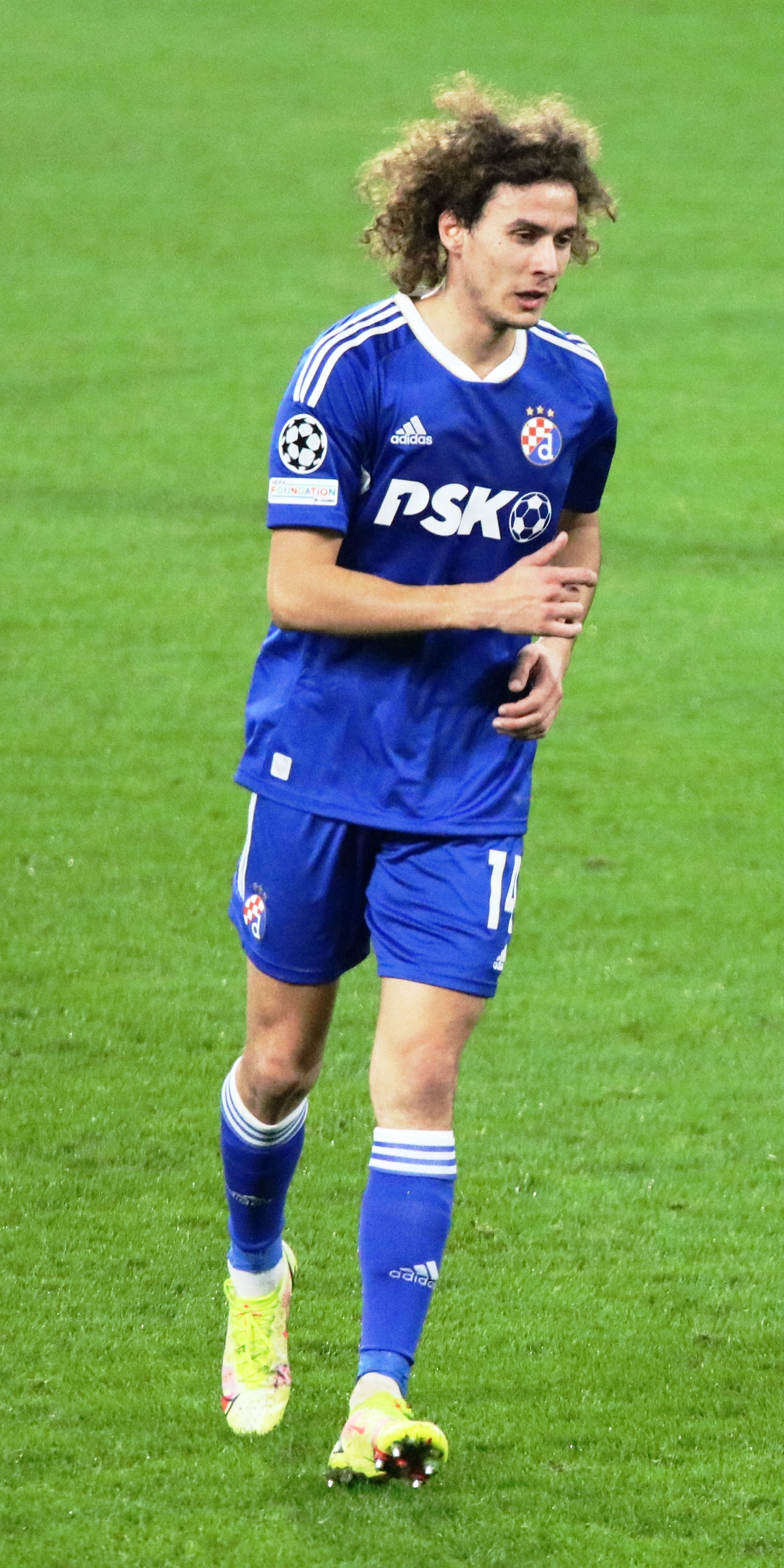
- Ljubičić with Dinamo Zagreb in 2022

Personal information
- Date of birth: 14 July 1999 (age 27)
- Place of birth: Vienna, Austria
- Height: 1.78 m (5 ft 10 in)
- Position: Midfielder

Team information
- Current team: LASK (on loan from AEK Athens)
- Number: 10

Youth career
- 2005–2006: Favoritner AC
- 2006–2009: Rapid Wien
- 2009–2014: Wiener Sportklub
- 2014–2018: AKA St. Pölten

Senior career*
Years	Team	Apps	(Gls)
2018	St. Pölten II	11	(1)
2018–2021	St. Pölten	92	(7)
2021–2022	Rapid Wien	27	(3)
2022–2024	Dinamo Zagreb	49	(3)
2024–	AEK Athens	47	(9)
2026–	→ LASK (loan)	9	(1)

International career^{‡}
2019	Croatia U20	2	(0)
2020	Austria U21	1	(0)
- * Club domestic league appearances and goals as of 31 October 2026 ‡ National team caps and goals as of 4 September 2020

Robert Ljubičić (born 14 July 1999) is a professional footballer who plays as a midfielder for Austrian Bundesliga club LASK, on loan from Greek Super League side AEK Athens. Born in Austria, he represents Croatia internationally.

== Club career ==
After three full seasons at St. Pölten in the Austrian Bundesliga, it was announced on 8 March 2021 that Ljubičić would join Rapid Wien in the summer of 2021 on a three-year deal. His brother, Dejan, was captain of the club at the time, but his departure to Köln in Germany was announced in April. He made his debut at Rapid in the second qualifying round of the UEFA Champions League against Sparta Prague on 20 July, in his brother's position of central midfield.

On 13 June 2022, HNL club Dinamo Zagreb announced the signing of Ljubičić. On 11 October 2022, he scored his first Champions League goal in a 1–1 draw against Red Bull Salzburg.

=== AEK Athens ===
On 31 January 2024, Ljubičić joined Super League Greece side AEK Athens for a fee of €4 million, becoming the club's second most expensive acquisition, only behind Orbelín Pineda. He signed a contract running until the summer of 2029. Roughly 20 days later, he scored his first goal in a 3–0 home win against Kifisia.

==== Loan to LASK ====
On 22 July 2026, Ljubičić joined Austrian Bundesliga club LASK on loan. A month later, on 25 August, he scored his first goal for the club in a 5–1 victory over Celtic after extra time in the Champions League qualifying play-off round, as the club qualified for the main tournament for the first time in its history.

== International career ==
Ljubičić is of Bosnian Croat descent, so he was eligible to represent Austria, Bosnia and Herzegovina and Croatia. He was capped for the Croatia U20 team in 2019, but decided to switch allegiances to Austria U21 team in 2020. He has not made a senior international debut for either country as of August 2021.

In November 2022, Ljubičić opted to represent Croatia instead of Austria.

== Style of play ==
In Austria, Ljubičić mainly played as a defensive midfielder. However, after joining Dinamo Zagreb, head coach Ante Čačić moved him to the position of left-back. Initially unwanted position, after half a year with Dinamo, Ljubičić stated that he adapted to the position and now prefers it.

== Personal life ==
His older brother Dejan is also a professional footballer. They were born in Austria to Bosnian Croat parents from Busovača.

== Career statistics ==
As of match played 3 November 2026

Appearances and goals by club, season and competition
Club	Season	League			National cup (Note: Includes Austrian Cup, Croatian Football Cup, Greek Football Cup)		Continental		Other		Total	
Club	Season	Division	Apps	Goals	Apps	Goals	Apps	Goals	Apps	Goals	Apps	Goals
St. Pölten	2017–18	Austrian Bundesliga	5	1	—		—		—		5	1
St. Pölten	2018–19	Austrian Bundesliga	26	1	3	1	—		—		29	2
St. Pölten	2019–20	Austrian Bundesliga	29	3	3	0	—		—		32	3
St. Pölten	2020–21	Austrian Bundesliga	32	2	1	0	—		—		33	2
St. Pölten	Total		92	7	7	1	—		—		99	8
Rapid Wien	2021–22	Austrian Bundesliga	27	3	2	0	11 (Note: One appearance in UEFA Champions League, eight appearances and one goal in UEFA Europa League, two appearances in UEFA Europa Conference League)	1	—		40	4
Dinamo Zagreb	2022–23	Prva HNL	33	2	4	1	12 (Note: Appearances in UEFA Champions League)	1	1 (Note: Appearance in Croatian Football Super Cup)	0	50	4
Dinamo Zagreb	2023–24	Prva HNL	16	1	0	0	11 (Note: Four appearances and one goal in UEFA Champions League, two appearances in UEFA Europa League, five appearances in UEFA Europa Conference League)	1	1	0	26	2
Dinamo Zagreb	Total		49	3	4	1	23	2	2	0	76	6
AEK Athens	2023–24	Super League Greece	11	3	0	0	—		—		11	3
AEK Athens	2024–25	Super League Greece	22	2	3	0	4 (Note: Appearances in UEFA Conference League)	1	—		29	3
AEK Athens	2025–26	Super League Greece	18	4	3	0	7	0	—		28	4
AEK Athens	Total		51	9	6	0	11	1	—		68	10
LASK (loan)	2026–27	Austrian Bundesliga	9	1	3	1	6	3	—		18	5
Career total			228	23	22	3	51	7	2	0	303	33

== Honours ==
Dinamo Zagreb

- Croatian Football League: 2022–23
- Croatian Super Cup: 2022, 2023

AEK Athens

- Super League Greece: 2025–26
