= Ivan Lučić (footballer, born 1995) =

Austrian footballer (born 1995)

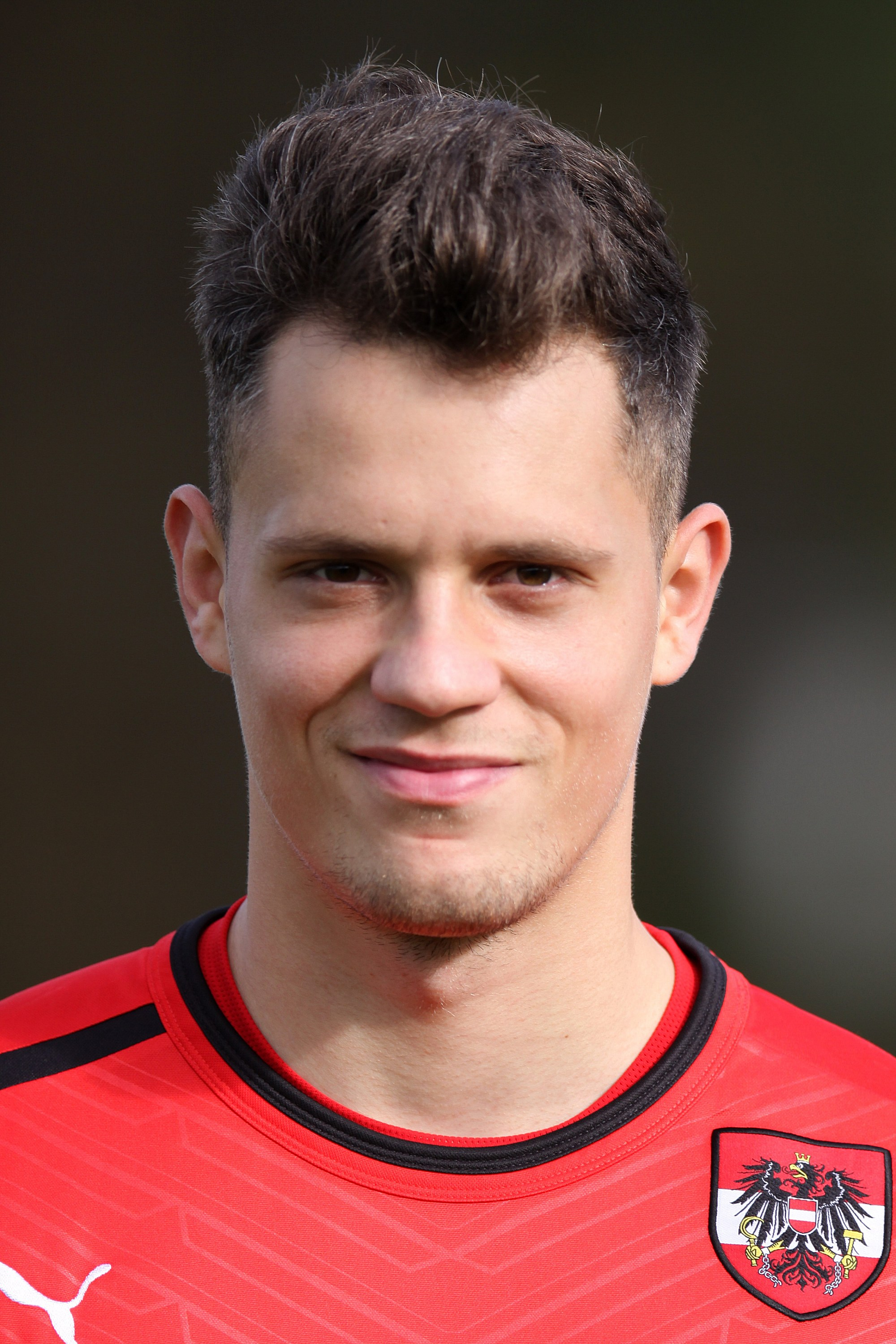
- Lučić in November 2015

Personal information
- Date of birth: 23 March 1995 (age 31)
- Place of birth: Vienna, Austria
- Height: 1.94 m (6 ft 4 in)
- Position: Goalkeeper

Team information
- Current team: Miedź Legnica
- Number: 1

Youth career
- 2004–2006: Post SV Wien
- 2006–2008: FC Stadlau
- 2008–2012: Austria Wien

Senior career*
Years	Team	Apps	(Gls)
2012	Austria Wien II	0	(0)
2012–2014	Ried	1	(0)
2013–2014	→ Union St. Florian (loan)	25	(2)
2014–2016	Bayern Munich II	15	(0)
2015–2016	Bayern Munich	0	(0)
2016–2018	Bristol City	2	(0)
2017	→ AaB (loan)	0	(0)
2018–2020	Austria Wien	23	(0)
2020–2023	Istra 1961	55	(0)
2023–2026	Hajduk Split	69	(0)
2026–	Miedź Legnica	14	(0)

International career
2010	Austria U16	3	(0)
2011	Austria U17	1	(0)
2012–2013	Austria U18	4	(0)
2013–2014	Austria U19	11	(0)
2016	Austria U21	1	(0)
- * Club domestic league appearances and goals as of 15:07, 29 May 2026 (UTC)

Ivan Lučić (born 23 March 1995) is an Austrian professional footballer who plays as a goalkeeper for I liga club Miedź Legnica.

== Club career ==
=== Youth years in Austria ===
Lučić began playing football when he was nine years old at the Viennese club Post SV in 2004. In 2006, he moved to FC Stadlau before entering the youth teams of Austria Vienna in 2008. After four years at die Veilchen, Lučić joined Austrian Bundesliga side SV Ried prior to the 2012–13 season. Eventually, he made his professional debut for Ried on 11 May 2014 in the last match of the 2013–14 season, a 2–5 home defeat against Rapid Vienna, where he played 89 minutes.

In order to receive more playing time, he was loaned to Austrian Regional League Central team Union St. Florian for the 2013–14 season. Lučić debuted for the club on the first day of the season in a 3–0 win against Klagenfurt. Late in the season, he was also able to score two goals for St. Florian, one via penalty kick in a home loss against Kapfenberger SV reserves on 2 May 2014 and one via a converted direct free kick in a home win against Union Vöcklamarkt on 16 May 2014.

=== Bayern Munich ===
Prior to the 2014–15 season, Lučić was transferred to German Regionalliga Bayern club FC Bayern Munich II, the reserve team of Bayern Munich. His first appearance for his new club was in a home loss against Würzburger Kickers on 11 July 2014. Soon thereafter, he was invited to join the professional team in their training camp in the United States. However, Lučić suffered a sprained ankle during the camp which sidelined him for several months. He returned to action for Bayern II on 10 April 2015. A few days later, first-team coach Pep Guardiola added him to the squad for the first leg of the 2014–15 UEFA Champions League quarterfinal against FC Porto.

=== Bristol City ===
On 27 July 2016, Lučić signed for Bristol City for an undisclosed fee, following a successful trial. Lučić made his Bristol City debut in a 2–1 EFL Cup win against Fulham on 21 September 2016, a game in which he saved a Cauley Woodrow penalty.

Lučić had his contract at the club cancelled by mutual consent on 31 January 2018, making two appearances for the club.

=== AaB (loan) ===
Lučić was loaned out to Danish Superliga-side AaB on 28 January 2017 for the rest of the season.

== International career ==
Born in Austria, Lučić is of Croatian descent. Lučić made his international debut for the Austria national youth football team in an under-16 match against Hungary at Bruck an der Leitha on 28 September 2010. His only under-17 team appearance came on 11 January 2011 against Portugal at Miróbriga. The first of four under-18 appearances was a match against the German under-17 team at Waldkraiburg on 14 April 2012. Lučić then debuted for the Austrian under-19 side against Northern Ireland at Vienna on 11 September 2013 and was subsequently added to the squad for the 2014 UEFA European Under-19 Championship, where he played in two group stage matches against Hungary and Israel and in the semifinal against Germany.

== Career statistics ==
As of match played 24 May 2026

Appearances and goals by club, season and competition
Club	Season	League			National cup (Note: Includes Austrian Cup, Danish Cup, Croatian Cup, Polish Cup)		League cup (Note: Includes Football League Cup)		Continental		Other		Total	
Club	Season	League	Apps	Goals	Apps	Goals	Apps	Goals	Apps	Goals	Apps	Goals	Apps	Goals
Ried	2013–14	Austrian Bundesliga	1	0	0	0	—		—		—		1	0
Union St. Florian (loan)	2013–14	Regional League Central	25	2	1	0	—		—		—		26	2
Bayern Munich II	2014–15	Regionalliga Bayern	4	0	—		—		—		—		4	0
Bayern Munich II	2015–16	Regionalliga Bayern	11	0	—		—		—		—		11	0
Bayern Munich II	Total		15	0	—		—		—		—		15	0
Bristol City	2016–17	Championship	2	0	0	0	1	0	—		—		3	0
Bristol City	2017–18	Championship	0	0	0	0	0	0	—		—		0	0
Bristol City	Total		2	0	0	0	1	0	—		—		3	0
AaB (loan)	2016–17	Danish Superliga	0	0	2	0	—		—		—		2	0
Austria Wien	2018–19	Austrian Bundesliga	5	0	—		—		—		—		5	0
Austria Wien	2019–20	Austrian Bundesliga	18	0	2	0	—		2 (Note: Appearances in UEFA Europa League)	0	—		22	0
Austria Wien	Total		23	0	2	0	—		2	0	—		27	0
Istra 1961	2020–21	Prva HNL	23	0	3	0	—		—		—		26	0
Istra 1961	2021–22	Prva HNL	31	0	1	0	—		—		—		32	0
Istra 1961	2022–23	Prva HNL	1	0	2	0	—		—		—		3	0
Istra 1961	Total		55	0	6	0	—		—		—		61	0
Hajduk Split	2022–23	Prva HNL	13	0	3	0	—		—		—		16	0
Hajduk Split	2023–24	Prva HNL	28	0	2	0	—		2 (Note: Appearances in UEFA Conference League)	0	1 (Note: Appearance in Croatian Super Cup)	0	33	0
Hajduk Split	2024–25	Prva HNL	28	0	2	0	—		4	0	—		34	0
Hajduk Split	2025–26	Prva HNL	0	0	0	0	—		0	0	—		0	0
Hajduk Split	Total		69	0	7	0	—		6	0	1	0	83	0
Miedź Legnica	2025–26	I liga	14	0	—		—		—		—		14	0
Career total			204	2	18	0	1	0	8	0	1	0	232	2

== Honours ==
Hajduk Split

- Croatian Cup: 2022–23
