= Elvis Letaj =

Kosovan footballer (born 2003)

Personal information
- Date of birth: 26 September 2003 (age 23)
- Place of birth: Karlovac, Croatia
- Height: 1.75 m (5 ft 9 in)
- Position: Left-back

Team information
- Current team: Ballkani
- Number: 22

Youth career
- 2013–2017: ŠN Joso Bego Šibenik
- 2017–2022: Hajduk Split

Senior career*
Years	Team	Apps	(Gls)
2020–2022	Hajduk Split II	1	(0)
2022–2025	Hajduk Split	4	(0)
2022	→ Tabor Sežana (loan)	17	(0)
2023	→ Kalcer Radomlje (loan)	2	(0)
2024	→ Radomlje (loan)	8	(0)
2025–	Ballkani	21	(0)

International career^{‡}
2019–2020	Croatia U17	5	(0)
2023	Kosovo U21	2	(0)
- * Club domestic league appearances and goals as of 22 June 2026 ‡ National team caps and goals as of 27 March 2023

Elvis Letaj (born 26 September 2003) is a professional footballer who plays as a left-back for Ballkani. Born in Croatia, he most recently represented Kosovo at youth level.

== Club career ==
=== Hajduk Split ===
Born in Karlovac, Letaj grew up in Šibenik, where he practiced football for four years at the Joso Bego Football School, before impressing HNK Hajduk Split scouts and moving to their academy in the summer of 2017.

On 4 October 2020, Letaj made his debut with Hajduk Split II in a 3–2 home win against Dubrava after being named in the starting line-up. On 17 July 2022, he was named as a Hajduk Split substitute for the first time in a league match against Istra 1961 after a long time and good performances in the under-19 team. Three days later, Letaj signed his first professional contract with Hajduk after agreeing to a three-year deal.

==== Loan at Tabor Sežana ====
On 20 July 2022, Hajduk Split after signing a professional contract with Letaj, announced the loan of him to Slovenian PrvaLiga club Tabor Sežana. A day later, the club confirmed that Letaj's loan was a season-long loan. His debut with Tabor Sežana came three days after joining in a 1–2 home defeat against Olimpija Ljubljana after being named in the starting line-up.

==== Return from loan ====
In January 2023, Letaj returned to Croatian Football League side Hajduk Split. On 11 February 2023, he was named as a Hajduk Split substitute for the first time after return in a league match against Varaždin. His debut with Hajduk Split came eight days later in a 2–1 home win against Gorica after coming on as a substitute in the 61st minute in place of Agustin Anello.

== International career ==
In September 2019, Letaj becomes part of Croatia U17 with which he made his debut in a 3–1 home defeat against Slovakia U17 after coming on as a substitute at 46th minute in place of Fran Žilinski. On 15 September 2022, he received a call-up from Kosovo U21 for a training camp held in Antalya, Turkey and for the hybrid friendly match against Greenland.

On 18 March 2023, Letaj received again a call-up from Kosovo U21 for the friendly matches against Moldova and Turkey. His official debut with Kosovo U21 came six days later in the friendly match against Moldova after being named in the starting line-up.
