= Emir Sahiti =

Kosovan footballer

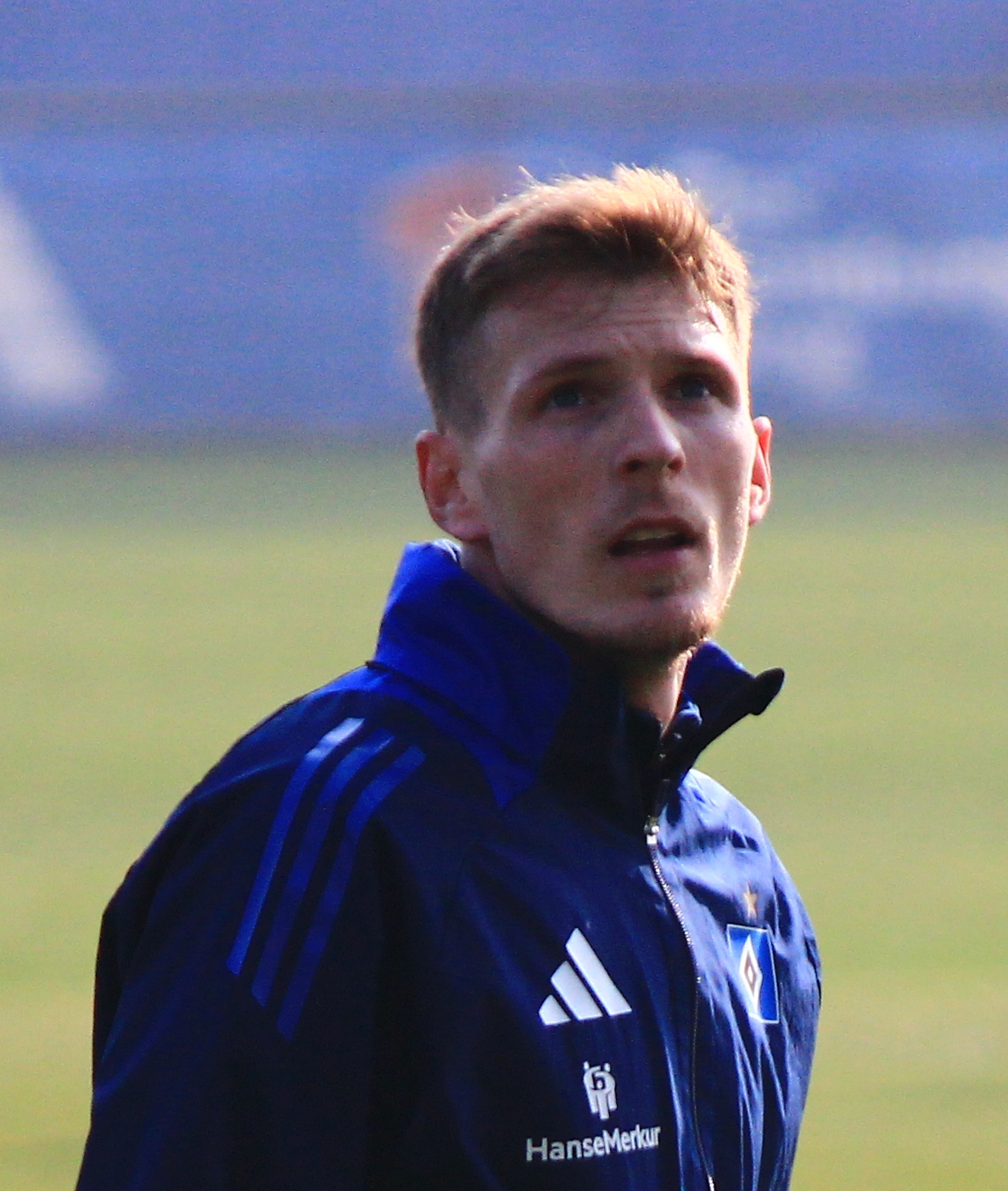
- Sahiti with Hamburger SV in 2025

Personal information
- Date of birth: 29 November 1998 (age 27)
- Place of birth: Zemun, FR Yugoslavia
- Height: 1.74 m (5 ft 9 in)
- Position: Left winger

Team information
- Current team: Hannover 96
- Number: 44

Youth career
- Ramiz Sadiku
- –2015: Prishtina

Senior career*
Years	Team	Apps	(Gls)
2015	Trepça '89	0	(0)
2015–2018	Rabotnički	32	(1)
2018–2020	Hajduk Split II	25	(2)
2018–2024	Hajduk Split	99	(13)
2020–2021	→ Šibenik (loan)	33	(7)
2024–2026	Hamburger SV	24	(3)
2026	→ Maccabi Tel Aviv (loan)	15	(2)
2026–	Hannover 96	0	(0)

International career^{‡}
2015	Albania U19	1	(0)
2018–2019	Albania U21	10	(2)
2022–	Kosovo	7	(1)
- * Club domestic league appearances and goals as of 1 September 2026 ‡ National team caps and goals as of 23:17, 23 March 2025 (UTC)

Emir Sahiti (born 29 November 1998) is a Kosovan professional footballer who plays as a left winger for 2. Bundesliga club Hannover 96. Born in Zemun, FR Yugoslavia (now Serbia), he is a former youth international for Albania and represents the Kosovo national team at senior level.

Sahiti began his youth career with Ramiz Sadiku before joining Prishtina, and made his senior debut in 2015 with Trepça '89. He later moved abroad to Rabotnički, where he gained regular first-team experience, before signing for Croatian club Hajduk Split in 2018. Initially featuring for Hajduk Split II, he established himself in the first team, making nearly 100 league appearances and scoring 13 goals. During the 2020–21 season, Sahiti was loaned to Šibenik, where he enjoyed a productive spell, scoring seven goals in 33 appearances.

In 2024, Sahiti joined Hamburger SV, continuing his career in Germany, and in 2026 he moved on loan to Israeli club Maccabi Tel Aviv.

At international level, Sahiti represented Albania at under-19 and under-21 level before switching allegiance to Kosovo. He made his senior international debut for Kosovo in 2022 and has since earned multiple caps, scoring his first international goal for the national team during this period.

== Club career ==
=== Early career and Trepça '89 ===
Sahiti is a product of the youth systems of Kosovan sides Ramiz Sadiku and Prishtina. In April 2014, Sahiti, together with his brother Suad, was on trial with Belgian team Standard Liège, but the trial was unsuccessful, despite earlier indications that they would sign a contract. On 25 June 2015, he joined Kosovo Superleague side Trepça '89.

=== Rabotnički ===
On 15 June 2015, Sahiti signed a two-year contract with Macedonian First League club Rabotnički, with the transfer becoming legally effective in August 2015. He joined his brother Suad, who had been part of Rabotnički since September 2014. On 17 October 2015, Sahiti made his debut in a 0–0 home draw against Bregalnica Štip after being named in the starting line-up.

==== Loan at Hajduk Split II ====
On 3 February 2018, Sahiti joined Croatian Second League side Hajduk Split II on a six-month loan with a buyout clause. On 10 March 2018, he made his debut in a 3–0 away defeat against Gorica after coming on as a substitute in the 78th minute in place of Tonio Teklić.

=== Return to Hajduk Split ===
On 29 August 2018, Sahiti returned and signed a four-year contract with Croatian club Hajduk Split. Eleven days later, he made his debut with the second team in a 2–0 home win against Kustošija after coming on as a substitute in the 74th minute in place of Stanko Jurić. On 1 December 2018, Sahiti was named as a first-team substitute for the first time in a league match against Rudeš. His debut with the first team came on 23 February 2019 in a 0–0 home draw against Gorica after coming on as a substitute in the 68th minute in place of Anthony Kalik.

==== Loan at Šibenik ====
On 21 July 2020, Sahiti joined Croatian First League side Šibenik on a season-long loan. On 15 August 2020, he made his debut in a 2–1 away defeat against Rijeka after being named in the starting line-up.

==== Return from loan ====
On 23 June 2021, Sahiti returned to Croatian First League side Hajduk Split after agreeing to a four-year contract extension and received squad number 77. On 17 July 2021, he made his debut against Lokomotiva after being named in the starting line-up and assisted in his side's first goal during a 2–2 away draw.

=== Hamburger SV ===
On 30 August 2024, Sahiti signed with Hamburger SV in Germany.

== International career ==
=== Youth ===
From 2015 until 2019, Sahiti was part of Albania at youth international level, having represented the U19 and U21 teams and he with these teams played eleven matches and scored two goals.

=== Senior ===
"I am very happy and proud to have joined the Kosovo national team. I will give my best for this jersey, because I grew up here and I feel extremely good being part of the Dardanians."

— Sahiti shares his first impression after deciding to play for Kosovo.

On 28 December 2021, the Football Federation of Kosovo announced that Sahiti had decided to represent the national team. On 18 March 2022, Sahiti received a call-up for friendly matches against Burkina Faso and Switzerland, but due to injury, he was unable to join the squad.

His debut for Kosovo came on 9 June 2022 in the UEFA Nations League match against Northern Ireland after coming on as a substitute in the 88th minute in place of Milot Rashica.

On 15 October 2024, he scored his first goal for Kosovo during a 2024–25 UEFA Nations League C match against Cyprus.

== Personal life ==
Sahiti was born in Zemun, FR Yugoslavia, to Albanian parents from Medveđa, and is the younger brother of Kosovo international Suad Sahiti.

== Career statistics ==
=== Club ===
As of match played 3 December 2025

Appearances and goals by club, season and competition
Club	Season	League			National cup		Europe		Other		Total	
Club	Season	Division	Apps	Goals	Apps	Goals	Apps	Goals	Apps	Goals	Apps	Goals
Rabotnički	2015–16	Macedonian First League	7	0	0	0	—		—		7	0
Rabotnički	2016–17	Macedonian First League	16	0	0	0	0	0	—		16	0
Rabotnički	2017–18	Macedonian First League	9	1	0	0	3 (Note: Appearances in UEFA Europa League)	0	—		12	1
Rabotnički	Total		32	1	0	0	3	0	—		35	1
Hajduk Split II	2017–18	Croatian Second League	9	1	—		—		—		9	1
Hajduk Split II	2018–19	Croatian Second League	14	1	—		—		—		14	1
Hajduk Split II	2019–20	Croatian Second League	2	0	—		—		—		2	0
Hajduk Split II	Total		25	2	—		—		—		25	2
Hajduk Split	2018–19	Croatian First League	4	0	—		—		—		4	0
Hajduk Split	2021–22	Croatian First League	32	5	5	1	2 (Note: Appearances in UEFA Conference League)	1	—		39	7
Hajduk Split	2022–23	Croatian League	27	4	1	0	4	1	1 (Note: Appearance in Croatian Football Super Cup)	0	33	5
Hajduk Split	2023–24	Croatian League	32	4	3	2	2	0	1	0	38	6
Hajduk Split	2024–25	Croatian League	4	0	3	0	0	0	—		7	0
Hajduk Split	Total		99	13	12	3	8	2	2	0	121	18
Šibenik (loan)	2020–21	Croatian First League	33	7	2	0	—		—		35	7
Hamburger SV	2024–25	2. Bundesliga	22	3	—		—		—		22	3
Hamburger SV	2025–26	Bundesliga	2	0	2	0	—		—		4	0
Hamburger SV	Total		24	3	2	0	—		—		26	0
Career total			213	26	16	3	11	2	2	0	242	31

=== International ===
As of match played 23 March 2025

Appearances and goals by national team and year
National team	Year	Apps	Goals
Kosovo	2022	2	0
Kosovo	2024	3	1
Kosovo	2025	2	0
Total		7	1

Scores and results list Kosovo's goal tally first, score column indicates score after each Emir Sahiti goal.

List of international goals scored by Emir Sahiti
No.	Date	Venue	Opponent	Score	Result	Competition	Ref.
1	15 October 2024	Fadil Vokrri Stadium, Pristina, Kosovo	Cyprus	3–0	3–0	2024–25 UEFA Nations League C	

== Honours ==
Hajduk Split

- Croatian Cup: 2021–22, 2022–23
