= Lukas Grgić =

Austrian footballer

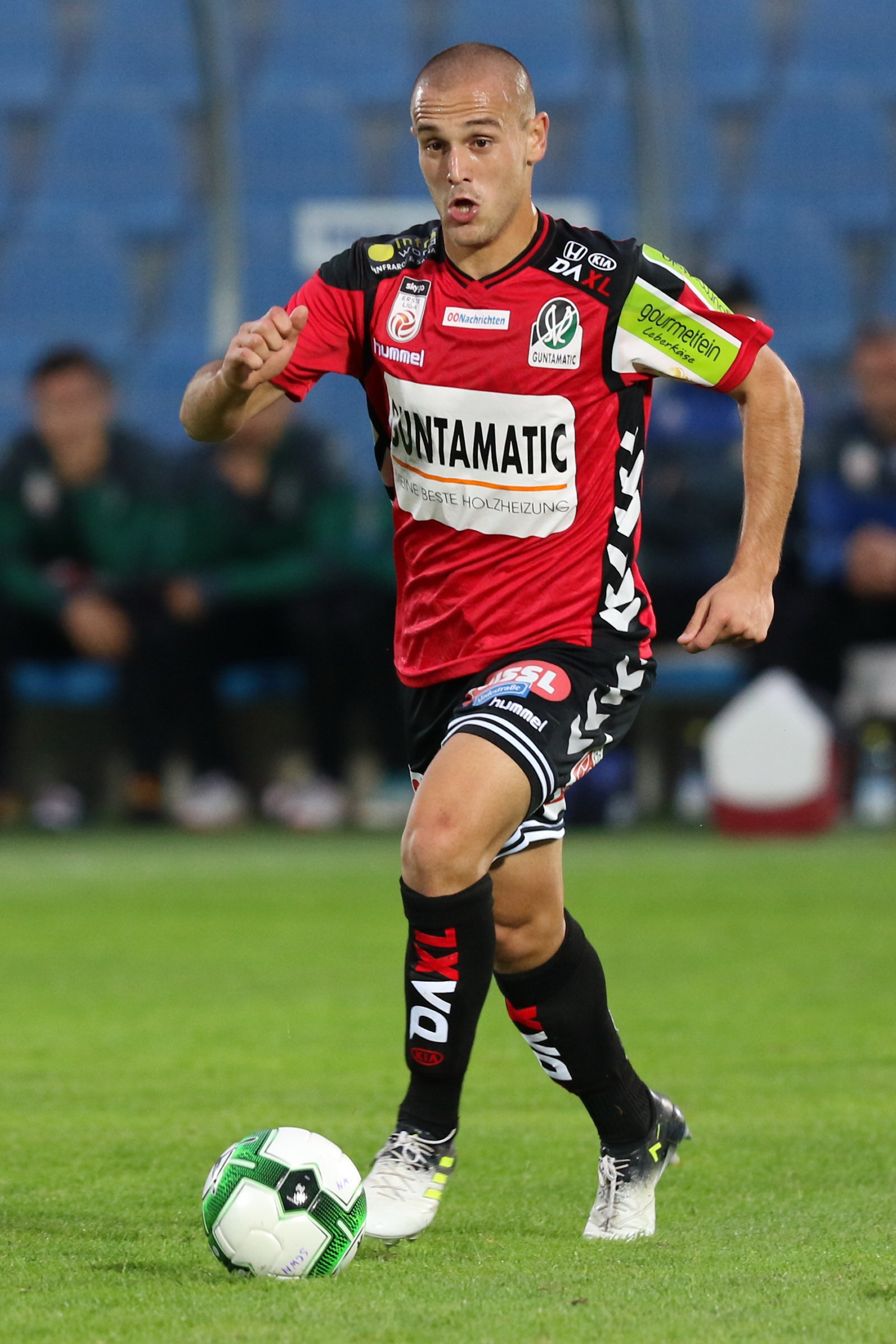
- Grgić with SV Ried in 2018

Personal information
- Date of birth: 17 August 1995 (age 31)
- Place of birth: Wels, Austria
- Height: 1.83 m (6 ft 0 in)
- Position: Midfielder

Team information
- Current team: Bari
- Number: 8

Youth career
- 2002–2011: FC Wels

Senior career*
Years	Team	Apps	(Gls)
2011–2013	FC Wels II	26	(2)
2012–2013	Wels	1	(0)
2012–2013	→ WSC Hertha Wels (loan)	21	(1)
2013–2014	Wallern	28	(1)
2014–2018	Pasching/LASK Juniors	46	(4)
2014–2018	LASK	31	(3)
2017–2018	→ Ried (loan)	27	(1)
2018–2019	Ried	27	(1)
2019–2020	Swarovski Tirol	19	(0)
2020–2022	LASK	28	(4)
2022–2023	Hajduk Split	38	(2)
2023–2026	Rapid Vienna	63	(2)
2026–	Bari	0	(0)
- * Club domestic league appearances and goals as of 10 May 2026

Lukas Grgić (born 17 August 1995) is an Austrian footballer who plays for Serie C Group C club Bari in Italy.

== Club career ==
On 10 January 2022, Grgić signed a 4.5-year contract with Hajduk Split in Croatia.

On 23 July 2026, Grgić joined Bari in Italy on a two-season deal.

== Personal life ==
Born in Austria, Grgić is of Croatian descent.

== Career statistics ==
As of match played 10 May 2026

Appearances and goals by club, season and competition
Club	Season	League			Cup		Continental		Other		Total	
Club	Season	Division	Apps	Goals	Apps	Goals	Apps	Goals	Apps	Goals	Apps	Goals
LASK	2014–15	2. Liga	4	0	—		—		—		4	0
LASK	2015–16	2. Liga	7	0	0	0	—		—		7	0
LASK	2016–17	2. Liga	20	3	2	0	—		—		22	3
LASK	Total		31	3	2	0	—		—		33	3
Ried (loan)	2017–18	Austrian Bundesliga	27	1	1	0	—		—		28	1
Ried	2018–19	Austrian Bundesliga	27	1	3	1	—		—		30	2
Swarovski Tirol	2019–20	Austrian Bundesliga	19	0	3	0	—		—		22	0
LASK	2020–21	Austrian Bundesliga	15	2	3	0	3	0	—		21	2
LASK	2021–22	Austrian Bundesliga	12	1	2	0	7	0	—		21	1
LASK	Total		27	3	5	0	10	0	—		42	3
Hajduk Split	2021–22	Prva HNL	12	1	2	0	—		—		14	1
Hajduk Split	2022–23	Prva HNL	26	1	2	0	4	0	1 (Note: Appearance in Croatian Football Super Cup)	0	33	1
Hajduk Split	Total		38	2	4	0	4	0	1	0	47	2
Rapid Wien	2023–24	Austrian Bundesliga	21	2	5	0	0	0	—		26	2
Rapid Wien	2024–25	Austrian Bundesliga	26	0	1	0	15 (Note: Five appearances and one goal in UEFA Europa League, ten appearances in UEFA Conference League)	1	—		42	1
Rapid Wien	2025–26	Austrian Bundesliga	16	0	2	0	8 (Note: Appearances in UEFA Conference League)	0	—		26	0
Rapid Wien	Total		63	2	8	0	23	1	—		94	3
Career Total			232	12	26	1	37	1	1	0	296	14

== Honours ==
Hajduk Split

- Croatian Cup: 2021–22
