= Anthony Kalik =

Australian soccer player

Personal information
- Full name: Anthony Kalik
- Date of birth: 5 November 1997 (age 29)
- Place of birth: St Leonards, New South Wales, Australia
- Height: 1.76 m (5 ft 9 1/2 in)
- Position: Attacking midfielder

Team information
- Current team: Kauno Žalgiris
- Number: 20

Youth career
- 2010–2011: Manly United
- 2012: NSWIS
- 2012–2013: AIS

Senior career*
Years	Team	Apps	(Gls)
2013	AIS	14	(5)
2014–2016	Central Coast Mariners	13	(0)
2016–2020	Hajduk Split	29	(0)
2016–2019	Hajduk Split II	24	(5)
2017–2018	→ Sydney FC (loan)	4	(0)
2018	→ Rudeš (loan)	16	(0)
2020–2022	Gorica	61	(11)
2022–2026	Hajduk Split	80	(6)
2026–	Kauno Žalgiris	7	(0)

International career^{‡}
2013–2016	Australia U20	4	(0)
2021	Australia U23	3	(0)
- * Club domestic league appearances and goals as of 17 September 2026 ‡ National team caps and goals as of 30 July 2021

Anthony Kalik (Croatian: [kalik] ka-LICK; born 5 November 1997) is an Australian professional soccer player who plays as an attacking midfielder for Toplyga club Kauno Žalgiris.

Kalik played youth football at Manly United FC and was then offered a 2 year scholarship at the Australian Institute of Sport before making his professional debut for Central Coast Mariners.

Kalik has represented Australia at under-20 level.

== Early life ==
Kalik is of Croatian origin. Both of his parents came to Australia from the island of Korčula, at time part of Yugoslavia. His father Denis, a former football player for BŠK Zmaj, is from Blato while his mother Francis is from Vela Luka.

== Club career ==
=== Central Coast Mariners ===
In 2013, Kalik signed a three-year deal with Central Coast Mariners, making him the youngest professional footballer in Australia. He made his competitive debut for the club in a win over Palm Beach in the 2014 FFA Cup, coming on for Glen Trifiro with ten minutes remaining. Kalik made his A-League debut in a victory over Adelaide United in February 2015.

=== Hajduk Split ===
On 1 February 2016 the Mariners announced that Kalik had been loaned to Hajduk Split until at least June 2016. He was recommended to the club by fellow Australian and former Hajduk player Josip Skoko. He made his first team debut for the club in the controversial 2–1 away loss to NK Lokomotiva, coming in at half-time for Manuel Arteaga. He managed to get 11 caps for Hajduk that season and make it into the first lineup as well.

On 28 May 2016, Hajduk Split bought him for 32,000 euros. For Hajduk, it was the first time since 2012 that they paid a transfer fee for a player.

==== Loan to Sydney FC ====
Kalik returned to Australia in September 2017 on loan, to play for Sydney FC in the 2017–18 season. At the end of the season he returned to Hajduk Split.

==== Loan to NK Rudeš ====
In July 2018 he joined Croatian Prva HNL club NK Rudeš on loan along with Frane Vojković. He had 16 appearances during first part of the season, which NK Rudeš concluded as the last team in the league. During winter break he returned to HNK Hajduk Split.

== International career ==
Kalik was selected for the Australia U-20 squad for 2014 AFC U-19 Championship qualification in October 2013. He made his debut in a win over Chinese Taipei.

== Career statistics ==
As of match played 5 May 2024

Appearances and goals by club, season and competition
Club	Season	League			Cup		Continental		Total	
Club	Season	Division	Apps	Goals	Apps	Goals	Apps	Goals	Apps	Goals
AIS	2013	National Premier Leagues	14	5	—		—		14	5
Central Coast Mariners	2014–15	A-League	8	0	1	0	0	0	9	0
Central Coast Mariners	2015–16	A-League	5	0	0	0	—		5	0
Central Coast Mariners	Total		13	0	1	0	0	0	14	0
Hajduk Split	2015–16	Croatian First Football League	11	0	1	0	—		12	0
Hajduk Split	2016–17	Croatian First Football League	0	0	0	0	0	0	0	0
Hajduk Split	2018–19	Croatian First Football League	9	0	0	0	—		9	0
Hajduk Split	2019–20	Croatian First Football League	9	0	1	0	1	0	11	0
Hajduk Split	Total		29	0	2	0	1	0	32	0
Hajduk II	2016–17	Croatian Third Football League	21	5	—		—		21	5
Hajduk II	2018–19	Croatian Second Football League	3	0	—		—		3	0
Hajduk II	Total		24	5	—		—		24	5
Sydney FC (loan)	2017–18	A-League	4	0	1	0	2	0	7	0
Rudeš (loan)	2018–19	Croatian First Football League	16	0	0	0	—		16	0
Gorica	2019–20	Croatian First Football League	9	0	0	0	—		9	0
Gorica	2020–21	Croatian First Football League	21	2	3	0	—		24	2
Gorica	2021–22	Croatian First Football League	27	7	4	1	—		31	8
Gorica	2022–23	Croatian First Football League	4	2	—		—		4	2
Gorica	Total		61	11	7	1	—		68	12
Hajduk Split	2022–23	Croatian First Football League	8	1	1	0	—		9	1
Hajduk Split	2023–24	Croatian First Football League	24	1	3	0	1	0	28	1
Hajduk Split	Total		32	2	4	0	1	0	37	2
Career total			193	23	15	1	4	0	212	24

== Honours ==
Hajduk II

- Croatian Third Football League South: 2016–17

Sydney

- A-League Premiership: 2017–18
- FFA Cup: 2017

Kauno Žalgiris

- Toplyga: 2026
- Lithuanian Cup: 2026

Records

- Youngest Central Coast Mariners player: 16 years, 347 days

== See also ==
- List of Central Coast Mariners FC players
