= Agustin Anello =

American soccer player (born 2002)

Personal information
- Full name: Agustín Anello Giaquinta
- Date of birth: April 22, 2002 (age 24)
- Place of birth: Hialeah, Florida, U.S.
- Height: 1.82 m (6 ft 0 in)
- Position: Winger

Team information
- Current team: Philadelphia Union
- Number: 28

Youth career
- Cornellà
- Espanyol
- 2019–2021: Lommel

Senior career*
Years	Team	Apps	(Gls)
2021–2023	Lommel	38	(7)
2023	→ Hajduk Split (loan)	11	(0)
2023–2024	Sparta Rotterdam	8	(0)
2023	Jong Sparta	1	(0)
2024	→ Cambuur (loan)	9	(0)
2024–2026	Boston River	41	(9)
2026–	Philadelphia Union	10	(1)

International career^{‡}
2023	United States U23	2	(0)
- * Club domestic league appearances and goals as of 08:33, 29 May 2026 (UTC) ‡ National team caps and goals as of November 29, 2023

Agustín Anello Giaquinta (born April 22, 2002) is an American professional soccer player who plays as a winger for the Philadelphia Union of Major League Soccer.

== Club career ==
As a youngster Anello played for the academies of Cornellà and Espanyol before joining Belgian side Lommel in 2019. In September 2021, he signed his first professional contract with the club. In February 2023, he joined Hajduk Split on loan until the end of the season with an option to make the deal permanent.

On July 2, 2023, Anello signed a contract with Sparta Rotterdam in the Netherlands for the term of three seasons, with an option for a fourth. In January 2024, he joined Cambuur on loan for the remainder of the season.

After spending a season with Boston River, Anello signed with the Philadelphia Union of Major League Soccer in February 2026. His contract is for the 2028–2029 season with an option for the 2029–2030 season. The transfer fee was a reported $2.5 million.

== International career ==
On November 18, 2023, Anello made his debut for United States under-23 as a substitute in a friendly against Iraq U23 that ended in a 1–1 draw.

== Personal life ==
Anello was born in Hialeah, Florida to Argentinian parents before moving with his family to Barcelona at the age of 10. His uncle Eliezer Anello was a professional footballer for Auckland City. He also holds Italian citizenship.

== Career statistics ==
=== Club ===
As of match played November 5, 2023

Appearances and goals by club, season and competition
Club	Season	League			National cup (Note: Includes Belgian Cup, Croatian Football Cup, KNVB Cup)		Total	
Club	Season	Division	Apps	Goals	Apps	Goals	Apps	Goals
Lommel	2021–22	Challenger Pro League	20	1	3	0	23	1
Lommel	2022–23	Challenger Pro League	18	6	1	0	19	6
Lommel	Total		38	7	4	0	42	7
Hajduk Split (loan)	2022–23	Croatian Football League	11	0	2	0	13	0
Sparta Rotterdam	2023–24	Eredivisie	8	0	1	0	9	0
Career total			57	7	7	0	64	7

== Honors ==
Hajduk Split

- Croatian Cup: 2022–23
