= Ivan Krolo =

Croatian footballer (born 2003)

Personal information
- Date of birth: 23 January 2003 (age 23)
- Place of birth: Split, Croatia
- Height: 1.89 m (6 ft 2 in)
- Position: Midfielder

Team information
- Current team: Croatia Zmijavci
- Number: 17

Youth career
- –2011: Solin
- 2011–2017: Adriatic Split
- 2017–2022: Hajduk Split

Senior career*
Years	Team	Apps	(Gls)
2020	Hajduk Split II	1	(0)
2022–2024	Hajduk Split	4	(0)
2023	→ Šibenik (loan)	1	(0)
2023–2024	→ Radomlje (loan)	30	(2)
2024–2025	Lokomotiva	0	(0)
2025	→ Dugopolje (loan)	14	(0)
2025–	Croatia Zmijavci	19	(1)

International career^{‡}
2017	Croatia U14	3	(0)
2018–2019	Croatia U16	6	(0)
2019–2020	Croatia U17	8	(0)
2021	Croatia U18	2	(0)
2021–2022	Croatia U19	9	(0)
- * Club domestic league appearances and goals as of 17 June 2026 ‡ National team caps and goals as of 23:01, 9 February 2025 (UTC)

Ivan Krolo (born 23 January 2003) is a Croatian footballer who plays as a midfielder for Croatia Zmijavci.

== Club career ==
Krolo signed a professional contract with Hajduk in 2022 August until the summer of 2027. Hajduk loaned Krolo to fellow Dalmatian first league side Šibenik for the second half of the 2022–23 season.

== Personal life ==
Krolo grew up in Solin with family roots originally from Aržano.
