= Haruki Arai =

Japanese association football player

Haruki Arai 新井 晴樹
Personal information
- Date of birth: 12 April 1998 (age 28)
- Place of birth: Fukaya, Saitama, Japan
- Height: 1.68 m (5 ft 6 in)
- Positions: Winger; midfielder

Team information
- Current team: Kyoto Sanga
- Number: 77

Youth career
- FC Civetta Fukaya
- FC Owl
- 2014–2016: Shochi Fukaya High School

College career
Years	Team	Apps	(Gls)
2017–2020	Kokushikan University		

Senior career*
Years	Team	Apps	(Gls)
2021–2023	FC TIAMO Hirakata	12	(1)
2021–2022	→ Cerezo Osaka (loan)	3	(0)
2022–2023	→ HNK Šibenik (loan)	35	(2)
2023	→ Cerezo Osaka (loan)	8	(0)
2024	Mito HollyHock	34	(1)
2025	Sagan Tosu	38	(3)
2026–	Kyoto Sanga	16	(2)
- * Club domestic league appearances and goals as of 1 August 2026

Haruki Arai (新井 晴樹, Arai Haruki; born 12 April 1998) is a Japanese footballer who plays as a midfielder for J1 League club Kyoto Sanga.

== Club career ==
Arai made his professional debut for Cerezo Osaka in an Emperor's Cup win against Albirex Niigata on 4 August 2021. Five days later, he made his J1 League debut, playing 45 minutes against Vegalta Sendai. From there to the end of the season, he was selected to play just another two matches for Cerezo, which were at the J.League Cup. His debut at the 2022 season for Cerezo came in the same competition, where he got an assist against Gamba Osaka, in the team's second match of the season. He played more two matches in March, being it the last month where he earned game time with Cerezo. Despite not playing too many minutes of football across the two seasons, it caught the attention of the 1.HNL club HNK Šibenik. He then left Cerezo to sign for the Croatian club on a loan transfer until 1 July 2023, being loaned by FC TIAMO Hirakata, from the Japan Football League, the 4th division in their league system.

Following his season at HNK Šibenik, Arai was loaned again to Cerezo Osaka, featuring in 8 games, before his transfer from TIAMO to Mito HollyHock was announced in late December 2013.

== Career statistics ==
=== Club ===
As of 21 April 2026

Appearances and goals by club, season and competition
Club	Season	League			National cup (Note: Includes Emperors Cup, Croatian Football Cup)		League cup (Note: Includes J.League Cup)		Total	
Club	Season	Division	Apps	Goals	Apps	Goals	Apps	Goals	Apps	Goals
FC TIAMO Hirakata	2021	JFL	12	1	–		–		12	1
Cerezo Osaka (loan)	2021	J1 League	1	0	1	0	2	0	4	0
Cerezo Osaka (loan)	2022	J1 League	2	0	0	0	4	0	6	0
Cerezo Osaka (loan)	Total		3	0	1	0	6	0	10	0
HNK Šibenik (loan)	2022–23	1. HNL	35	2	4	1	0	0	39	3
Cerezo Osaka (loan)	2023	J1 League	8	0	1	0	0	0	9	0
Mito HollyHock	2024	J2 League	34	1	1	0	1	0	36	1
Sagan Tosu	2025	J2 League	38	3	1	0	1	0	40	3
Kyoto Sanga	2026	J1 (100)	9	0	–		–		9	0
Career total			139	7	8	1	8	0	155	8
