= Mislav Matić =

Croatian footballer (born 2000)

Personal information
- Date of birth: 6 January 2000 (age 26)
- Place of birth: Sinj, Croatia
- Height: 1.95 m (6 ft 5 in)
- Position: Centre-back

Team information
- Current team: Vardar
- Number: 4

Youth career
- –2017: Junak Sinj
- 2017–2018: Rudeš
- 2018–2019: Lokomotiva Zagreb

Senior career*
Years	Team	Apps	(Gls)
2019–2020	Lokomotiva Zagreb	0	(0)
2019–2020	→ Rudeš (loan)	15	(0)
2020–2022	Mynai	35	(0)
2022–2023	Šibenik	33	(1)
2023	Rudeš	15	(0)
2024	Široki Brijeg	6	(0)
2025–	Vardar	46	(4)

International career
2019	Croatia U19	1	(0)
2019	Croatia U20	1	(0)
- * Club domestic league appearances and goals as of 23 May 2026

Mislav Matić (born 6 January 2000) is a Croatian footballer playing as a centre-back who plays for Vardar.

== Career ==
=== Youth career and Lokomotiva Zagreb ===
Until the age of 17, Matić played for Croatian Third Football League side Junak Sinj before joining Lokomotiva Zagreb in the top flight.

=== Rudeš ===
In 2019, he was sent on loan to Croatian Second Football League team Rudeš until the end of the season.

=== Mynai ===
In 2020, he signed for Mynai in the Ukrainian top flight.

=== Šibenik ===
In summer 2022, he signed for Šibenik.

== Personal life ==
Matić's older brother, Bernardo, is also a footballer.
