= Filip Krovinović =

Croatian footballer

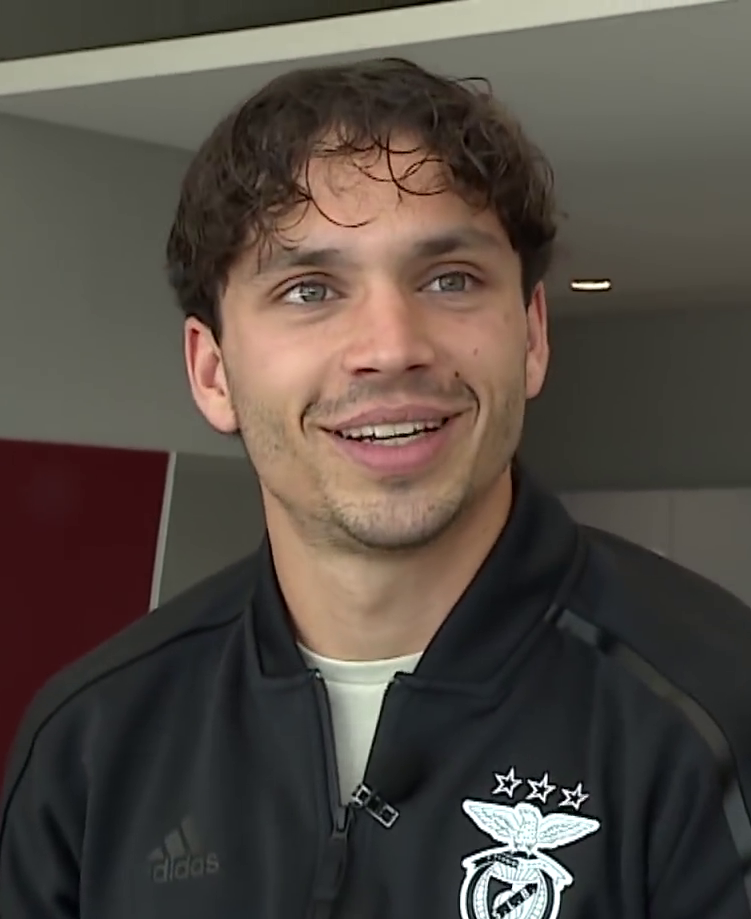
- Krovinović with Benfica in 2018

Personal information
- Full name: Filip Krovinović
- Date of birth: 29 August 1995 (age 31)
- Place of birth: Zagreb, Croatia
- Height: 1.75 m (5 ft 9 in)
- Position: Midfielder

Team information
- Current team: Grêmio
- Number: 10

Youth career
- 2004–2007: Lokomotiva Zagreb
- 2007–2009: Dinamo Zagreb
- 2009–2012: Zagreb

Senior career*
Years	Team	Apps	(Gls)
2012–2015	Zagreb	75	(12)
2015–2017	Rio Ave	35	(5)
2017–2021	Benfica	17	(1)
2019	Benfica B	3	(0)
2019–2021	→ West Bromwich Albion (loan)	51	(3)
2021	→ Nottingham Forest (loan)	19	(1)
2021–2026	Hajduk Split	159	(15)
2026–	Grêmio		

International career^{‡}
2013	Croatia U19	4	(0)
2014–2016	Croatia U21	11	(1)
- * Club domestic league appearances and goals as of 15 June 2026 ‡ National team caps and goals as of 14 March 2019

Filip Krovinović (born 29 August 1995) is a Croatian professional footballer who plays as a midfielder for Campeonato Brasileiro Série A club Grêmio.

== Club career ==
=== NK Zagreb ===
Krovinović, coming from the NK Zagreb academy, made his Prva HNL debut against GNK Dinamo Zagreb on 5 April 2013, signing a five-year professional contract with the team soon after. In the summer of 2015, due to increasing financial problems at NK Zagreb and transfer window moving towards the end, media rumors of a transfer to Dinamo Zagreb and especially to Hajduk Split became more intense, however a compensation fee of €400,000 plus a percentage of any future transfer which NK Zagreb was seeking wasn't paid by either club. In the end, both Krovinović and NK Zagreb accepted a transfer bid from Portugal.

=== Rio Ave ===
On 30 August 2015, Krovinović signed a four-year contract with Portuguese club Rio Ave of the Primeira Liga. Towards the late end of summer transfer window, he joined a Rio Ave team who by then had a series of positive results. Regular Croatian under 21 national team member made his debut for Rio Ave on 10 October 2015 in starting eleven against Vitória de Guimarães in a league cup match at home, ending in a 3–2 victory. In next three months Krovinović gathered only seven appearances, one of which was the away league cup match on 29 December 2015 against Leixões that Rio Ave won 2–1. For a second time that season Krovinović played all 90 minutes being one of the match heroes. The young midfielder was in process of adjusting to the demands of the Primeira Liga and Rio Ave, gradually receiving more and more playing time. Over the next two months Krovinović managed to gather 10 more appearances, scoring two goals.

His first goal for Rio Ave came on 13 January 2016 in a quarter-final national cup match against Estoril, in which he scored the second goal of the game in a 3–0 home victory seeing Rio Ave progress to semi-finals of the Portuguese Cup. A week later he scored his second goal in a 1–1 home league cup draw with Belenenses. His last appearance in 2015–16 season, making a total of 17 appearances in his first season with Rio Ave, was on 7 March 2016 in round 25 of the Primeira Liga against Estoril as a half-time substitute in a 3–1 defeat at home. Since then, Krovinović was oddly removed from the starting eleven and even from the bench on most occasions, being excluded from the squad for the rest of the season. Despite the fact that he did not play in any Rio Ave official match for next three months, Krovinović made great progress advancing in various technical and tactical segments bracing himself for very fast, technically polished football played in Primeira Liga.

With the end of 2015–16 campaign and replacement of coach Pedro Martins by coach Capucho on 20 May 2016, Krovinović received a number 10 jersey at the beginning of the 2016–17 season, thus acknowledging high expectations the club had for him in becoming one of the more important players for the team in an upcoming season. With the arrival of new coach Luís Castro, Krovinović started to play more scoring two goals this season.

=== Benfica ===
On 14 June 2017, Krovinović signed a five-year contract with Portuguese champions Benfica. He won the 2018–19 Primeira Liga with them in his second season at the club.

==== Loans to West Bromwich Albion ====
After winning the league title with Benfica, Krovinović was loaned out to West Bromwich Albion in the EFL Championship, initially for one season. After returning to his parent club over the summer, Benfica agreed another season-long loan with West Brom. On 4 October 2020, Krovinović made his Premier League debut as a substitute for Romaine Sawyers in a 2–0 away defeat by Southampton.

==== Loan to Nottingham Forest ====
On 22 January 2021, Krovinović was recalled from his loan at West Bromwich Albion and immediately loaned to Nottingham Forest for the remainder of the 2020–21 season. He scored his first goal for Nottingham Forest in a 1–1 draw with Brentford on 20 March 2021.

=== Hajduk Split ===
On 19 July 2021, Krovinović returned to the Croatian Football League, signing with HNK Hajduk Split. He signed a contract until the summer of 2024 and picked jersey number 23. In his first season with Hajduk, Krovinović won the 2021–22 Croatian Football Cup. Krovinović reached 100 appearances for Hajduk in a 1–1 draw away at NK Osijek.

Grêmio

On 27 July 2026, Krovinović signed for Brazilian side Grêmio FBPA on a contract until the end of 2028.

== International career ==
On 1 September 2016 at Gradski stadion in Koprivnica Krovinović played 90 minutes for Croatia U21 in 2017 UEFA European Under-21 Championship qualification Group 6 home match against Sweden. Match ended in 1–1 draw with Krovinović missing to complete a goal at the opening when his shot was off target by a thin margin thus failing to gain advantage from Croats better start. Draw was a bit of disappointment and compromised the position and chances to qualify for European Under-21 Championship even though Croatia remained group leader.

== Career statistics ==
As of match played 28 April 2024

Appearances and goals by club, season and competition
Club	Season	League			National cup		League cup		Europe		Total	
Club	Season	Division	Apps	Goals	Apps	Goals	Apps	Goals	Apps	Goals	Apps	Goals
NK Zagreb	2012–13	Prva HNL	2	0	0	0	—		—		2	0
NK Zagreb	2013–14	Druga HNL	32	7	2	1	—		—		34	8
NK Zagreb	2014–15	Prva HNL	35	3	1	0	—		—		36	3
NK Zagreb	2015–16	Prva HNL	6	2	0	0	—		—		6	2
NK Zagreb	Total		75	12	3	1	—		—		78	13
Rio Ave	2015–16	Primeira Liga	9	0	4	1	4	1	—		17	1
Rio Ave	2016–17	Primeira Liga	26	5	1	0	4	0	2 (Note: Appearance(s) in UEFA Europa League)	0	33	5
Rio Ave	Total		35	5	5	1	8	1	2	0	50	6
Benfica	2017–18	Primeira Liga	13	1	3	1	3	0	—		19	2
Benfica	2018–19	Primeira Liga	4	0	2	0	1	0	2	0	9	0
Benfica	Total		17	1	5	1	4	0	2	0	28	2
West Bromwich Albion	2019–20	Championship	40	3	2	0	1	0	—		43	3
West Bromwich Albion	2020–21	Premier League	11	0	1	0	0	0	—		12	0
West Bromwich Albion	Total		51	3	3	0	1	0	0	0	55	3
Nottingham Forest (loan)	2020–21	Championship	19	1	—		—		—		19	1
Hajduk Split	2021–22	Prva HNL	27	5	3	2	—		2	0	32	7
Hajduk Split	2022–23	Prva HNL	35	1	4	1	—		4	1	43	3
Hajduk Split	2023–24	Prva HNL	31	5	3	1	—		2	0	36	6
Hajduk Split	Total		93	11	10	4	—		8	1	111	16
Career total			290	33	26	7	13	1	12	1	341	42

== Honours ==
NK Zagreb

- Druga HNL: 2013–14

Benfica

- Primeira Liga: 2018–19

Hajduk Split

- Croatian Cup: 2021–22, 2022–23
