= Ivan Ćubelić =

Croatian footballer (born 2003)

Personal information
- Date of birth: 2 June 2003 (age 23)
- Place of birth: Split, Croatia
- Height: 1.84 m (6 ft 0 in)
- Position: Midfielder

Team information
- Current team: Rijeka
- Number: 8

Youth career
- 2010–2011: Solin
- 2011–2013: Adriatic Split
- 2013–2020: Hajduk Split

Senior career*
| Years | Team | Apps | (Gls) |
| 2020–2021 | Hajduk Split II | 22 | (1) |
| 2021–2024 | Hajduk Split | 12 | (1) |
| 2021–2022 | → Dugopolje (loan) | 21 | (4) |
| 2022 | → Varaždin (loan) | 3 | (0) |
| 2023 | → Solin (loan) | 12 | (2) |
| 2024–2026 | Slaven Belupo | 62 | (2) |
| 2026– | Rijeka | 0 | (0) |

International career^{‡}
| 2017 | Croatia U14 | 3 | (0) |
| 2018 | Croatia U15 | 5 | (0) |
| 2018 | Croatia U16 | 2 | (0) |
| 2018–2020 | Croatia U17 | 19 | (2) |
| 2021 | Croatia U19 | 6 | (0) |
| 2023 | Croatia U20 | 1 | (0) |
- * Club domestic league appearances and goals as of 15 June 2026 ‡ National team caps and goals as of 7 June 2023

Ivan Ćubelić (born 2 June 2003) is a Croatian footballer currently playing as a midfielder for Slaven Belupo. He was included in The Guardian's "Next Generation 2020".

== Career statistics ==
=== Club ===
As of 20 July 2022.

=== Current Club ===
Slaven Belupo

| Club | Season | League | | | Cup | | Continental | | Other | | Total | |
| Club | Season | Division | Apps | Goals | Apps | Goals | Apps | Goals | Apps | Goals | Apps | Goals |
|---|---|---|---|---|---|---|---|---|---|---|---|---|
| Hajduk Split II | 2020–21 | 2. HNL | 22 | 1 | – | | – | | 0 | 0 | 22 | 1 |
| Hajduk Split | 2021–22 | 1. HNL | 1 | 0 | 0 | 0 | 0 | 0 | 0 | 0 | 1 | 0 |
| Dugopolje (loan) | 2021–22 | 2. HNL | 21 | 4 | 0 | 0 | – | | 0 | 0 | 21 | 4 |
| Hajduk Split | 2022–23 | 1. HNL | 1 | 0 | 0 | 0 | 0 | 0 | 0 | 0 | 1 | 0 |
| Career total | | | 45 | 5 | 0 | 0 | 0 | 0 | 0 | 0 | 45 | 5 |
