= Stefan Simić =

Czech footballer

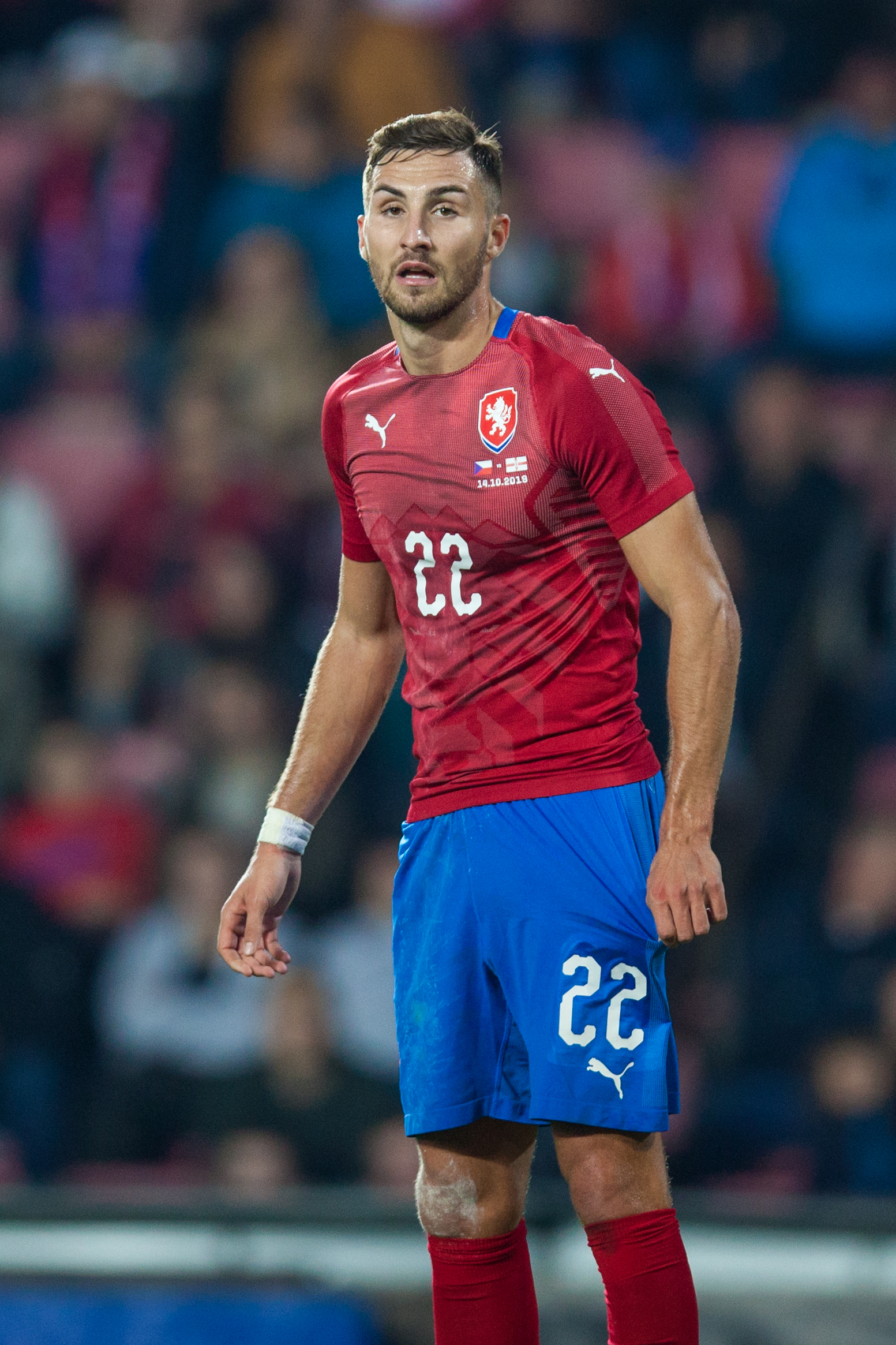
- Simić with the Czech Republic in 2019

Personal information
- Full name: Stefan Simić
- Date of birth: 20 January 1995 (age 31)
- Place of birth: Prague, Czech Republic
- Height: 1.89 m (6 ft 2 1/2 in)
- Positions: Centre-back; right-back

Team information
- Current team: Omonia
- Number: 27

Youth career
- 2001–2012: Slavia Prague
- 2012–2013: Genoa
- 2013–2014: AC Milan

Senior career*
Years	Team	Apps	(Gls)
2014–2019	AC Milan	0	(0)
2014–2015	→ Varese (loan)	17	(0)
2016–2017	→ Mouscron (loan)	30	(1)
2017–2018	→ Crotone (loan)	9	(0)
2019	→ Frosinone (loan)	0	(0)
2019–2023	Hajduk Split	77	(3)
2023–2024	Eibar	1	(0)
2024–2025	Karmiotissa	19	(0)
2025–	Omonia	24	(1)

International career
2011	Czech Republic U16	6	(0)
2011–2012	Czech Republic U17	16	(1)
2012–2014	Czech Republic U19	15	(0)
2014	Czech Republic U20	3	(0)
2016–2017	Czech Republic U21	10	(0)
2017–2019	Czech Republic	2	(0)
- * Club domestic league appearances and goals as of 23 May 2026

Stefan Simić (Czech: Simič, pronounced [stêfaːn sǐːmitɕ]; born 20 January 1995) is a Czech professional footballer who plays as a defender for Omonia.

== Club career ==
=== Early career ===
Simić entered Slavia Prague's youth ranks at the age of six. He rose through the ranks and became the youngest player to sign a professional contract with the club, aged 15 years and 11 months. He played his first minutes for the senior side on 12 February 2011 in a friendly match against Croatian side Hajduk Split, as a part of the latter's centenary celebration, in honour of his mother's death. He left the club before making his debut in an official match, joining the youth ranks of Genoa in Italy in January 2012. The transfer reportedly cost 12 million Kč.

=== AC Milan ===
Simić played for a year and a half for Genoa Primavera side before moving to AC Milan. He was an integral part of the youth team that won the 2014 Torneo di Viareggio

In the summer of 2014, Simić joined the Serie B side Varese on loan and played 17 games for the team during the season. After missing out on the first half of the 2015–16 season due to injury to his right fibula, Simić was supposed to join Hajduk Split in a six-month loan deal in January 2016. While he was already in Split to sign, he was recalled to Milan due to the injury of his teammate Philippe Mexès.

For the 2016–17 season, Simić was loaned out to Belgian First Division side Royal Mouscron-Péruwelz. On 31 August 2017, he was loaned out again, this time to Serie A club Crotone.

On 24 January 2019, Simić joined Serie A club Frosinone on loan until 30 June.

=== Hajduk Split ===
On 28 June 2019, Simić joined Croatian First Football League club Hajduk Split on a free transfer. He signed four-year contract.

=== Eibar ===
On 12 September 2023, Simić signed a one-year contract with Eibar in the Spanish Segunda División.

== International career ==
Simić chose to represent Czech Republic while having the possibility to play for Croatia, Serbia and Bosnia and Herzegovina, from which his parents came from, his father's ethnicity and whose passports he holds as well.

Simić accumulated 40 caps and 1 goal between 2011 and 2014 for the Czech youth national teams, playing at U16, U17, U19, U20 and U21 levels. He debuted for Czech national football team on 11 November 2017 in a 1–0 victory against Qatar.

== Personal life ==
Simić is of Bosnian Serb and Croatian descent. His father Radoje hails from Prijedor, Bosnia and Herzegovina and his mother Suzana hails from Zagreb, Croatia. His family fled to Prague during the Croatian War of Independence before his birth. He considers himself a fan of Hajduk Split and Slavia Prague.

== Career statistics ==
=== Club ===
As of match played 25 June 2025

Appearances and goals by club, season and competition
Club	Season	League			National cup (Note: Includes Coppa Italia, Belgian Cup, Croatian Cup, Copa del Rey, Cypriot Cup)		Continental		Other		Total	
Club	Season	Division	Apps	Goals	Apps	Goals	Apps	Goals	Apps	Goals	Apps	Goals
Varese (loan)	2014–15	Serie B	17	0	3	0	—		—		20	0
Milan	2015–16	Serie A	0	0	0	0	—		—		0	0
Milan	2018–19	Serie A	0	0	0	0	1	0	—		1	0
Milan	Total		0	0	0	0	1	0	—		1	0
Mouscron (loan)	2016–17	Belgian First Division A	30	1	2	1	—		—		32	2
Crotone (loan)	2017–18	Serie A	9	0	1	0	—		—		10	0
Hajduk Split	2019–20	Prva HNL	16	1	1	0	1	0	—		18	1
Hajduk Split	2020–21	Prva HNL	24	1	3	0	—		—		27	1
Hajduk Split	2021–22	Prva HNL	22	1	2	0	2	0	—		26	1
Hajduk Split	2022–23	Prva HNL	15	0	2	0	3	0	—		20	0
Hajduk Split	Total		77	3	8	0	6	0	0	0	91	3
Eibar	2023–24	Segunda División	1	0	3	0	—		—		4	0
Karmiotissa	2024–25	Cypriot First Division	19	0	0	0	—		—		19	0
Omonia	2024–25	Cypriot First Division	10	0	2	0	0	0	—		12	0
Career Total			163	4	19	1	7	0	0	0	189	5

== Honours ==
Hajduk Split

- Croatian Cup: 2021–22

Omonia

- Cypriot First Division: 2025–26
