= 2021–22 HNK Hajduk Split season =

Hajduk Split
2021–22 season
- Chairman: Lukša Jakobušić
- Manager: Paolo Tramezzani (until 27 May 2021); Jens Gustafsson (28 May 2021 - 1 November 2021); Valdas Dambrauskas (since 2 November 2021)
- Prva HNL: 2nd
- Croatian Cup: Winners
- Europa Conference League: Second qualifying round
- Top goalscorer: League: Marko Livaja (28); All: Marko Livaja (32)
- Highest home attendance: 30,524 (vs. Osijek) (19 December 2021)
- Lowest home attendance: 3,240 (vs. Hrvatski Dragovoljac) (6 November 2021)
- Average home league attendance: 12,667
Home colours	Away colours	Third colours

The 2021–22 season was the 111th season in Hajduk Split’s history and their thirty-first in the Prva HNL.

== First-team squad ==
For details of former players, see List of HNK Hajduk Split players.

As of 30 April 2022

Note: Flags indicate national team as defined under FIFA eligibility rules; some limited exceptions apply. Players may hold more than one non-FIFA nationality.

No.	Pos.	Nation	Player
1	GK	CRO	Danijel Subašić
2	DF	CRO	Nikola Katić (on loan from Rangers)
3	DF	CRO	David Čolina
4	MF	CRO	Josip Vuković
6	MF	ITA	Marco Fossati
7	FW	SWE	Alexander Kačaniklić
8	DF	CZE	Stefan Simić (Vice-captain)
9	FW	CRO	Nikola Kalinić
10	MF	CRO	Marko Livaja
11	MF	NGR	Samuel Eduok
14	MF	AUT	Lukas Grgić
17	DF	CRO	Dario Melnjak
19	DF	CRO	Josip Elez (3rd captain)

No.	Pos.	Nation	Player
20	MF	MKD	Jani Atanasov
23	MF	CRO	Filip Krovinović
24	DF	CRO	Dino Mikanović
26	DF	HUN	Gergő Lovrencsics
27	MF	CRO	Stipe Biuk
29	FW	SLO	Jan Mlakar
33	GK	CRO	Toni Silić
70	GK	CRO	Josip Posavec
77	FW	ALB	Emir Sahiti
90	FW	CRO	Marin Ljubičić
91	GK	CRO	Lovre Kalinić (Captain; on loan from Aston Villa)
97	DF	POR	Ferro (on loan from Benfica)

== Competitions ==
=== Overview ===
Competition	First match	Last match	Starting round	Final position	Record							
Competition	First match	Last match	Starting round	Final position	Pld	W	D	L	GF	GA	GD	Win %
HT Prva liga	17 July 2021	21 May 2022	Matchday 1	2nd	36	21	9	6	64	31	+33	58.33
Croatian Cup	21 September 2021	26 May 2022	First Round	Winners	5	5	0	0	18	7	+11	100.00
Europa Conference League	22 July 2021	29 July 2021	Second qualifying round	Second qualifying round	2	1	0	1	3	4	−1	50.00
Total					43	27	9	7	85	42	+43	62.79

Last updated: 26 May 2022
Source: Soccerway

=== HT Prva liga ===
==== Classification ====
Pos	Team	Pld	W	D	L	GF	GA	GD	Pts	Qualification or relegation
1	Dinamo Zagreb (C)	36	24	7	5	68	22	+46	79	Qualification to Champions League second qualifying round
2	Hajduk Split	36	21	9	6	64	31	+33	72	Qualification to Europa Conference League third qualifying round (Note: The cup winner, Hajduk Split, will enter the third qualifying round of the Europa Conference League.)
3	Osijek	36	19	12	5	49	29	+20	69	Qualification to Europa Conference League second qualifying round
4	Rijeka	36	20	5	11	71	51	+20	65	Qualification to Europa Conference League second qualifying round
5	Lokomotiva	36	12	13	11	55	50	+5	49	

Source: PrvaHNL.hr
Rules for classification: 1) Points; 2) Head-to-head points; 3) Head-to-head goal difference; 4) Head-to-head goals scored (at home if two teams tied); 5) Goal difference; 6) Goals scored; 7) Play-off
(Note: Criteria 2-4 and 7 is only used if deciding champion, teams to international competition or teams for relegation and in that case criteria 6 will not be used).
(C) Champions

==== Results summary ====
Overall								Home						Away					
Pld	W	D	L	GF	GA	GD	Pts	W	D	L	GF	GA	GD	W	D	L	GF	GA	GD
36	21	9	6	64	31	+33	72	12	3	3	29	11	+18	9	6	3	35	20	+15

Last updated: 21 May 2022.
Source: Prva HNL

==== Results by round ====
Round	1	2	3	4	5	6	7	8	9	10	11	12	13	14	15	16	17	18	19	20	21	22	23	24	25	26	27	28	29	30	31	32	33	34	35	36
Ground	A	H	H	A	H	A	H	A	H	H	A	A	H	A	H	A	H	A	A	H	A	A	H	A	H	A	H	H	A	H	H	A	H	A	H	A
Result	D	L	W	W	W	W	L	W	W	W	D	L	D	L	W	W	W	W	D	D	W	W	W	W	L	D	D	W	D	W	W	D	W	W	W	L
Position	5	8	7	3	3	1	3	2	2	2	3	4	4	4	4	4	4	2	4	4	2	2	2	2	3	4	3	3	3	3	3	3	2	2	2	2

Updated to match(es) played on 21 May 2022. Source: Prva HNL
A = Away; H = Home; W = Win; D = Draw; L = Loss

==== Results by opponent ====
Team	Results				Points
Team	1	2	3	4	Points
Dinamo Zagreb	1–0	2–0	0–0	1–3	7
Gorica	3–1	0–0	4–0	1–0	10
Hrvatski Dragovoljac	1–0	2–0	3–0	2–1	12
Istra 1961	3–1	4–0	1–1	3–1	10
Lokomotiva	2–2	1–0	3–3	4–0	8
Osijek	1–2	1–1	0–0	0–0	3
Rijeka	1–2	3–2	1–3	3–0	6
Slaven Belupo	2–0	2–3	3–1	0–0	7
Šibenik	1–0	0–2	3–1	2–1	9

Source: 2021–22 Croatian First Football League article

== Matches ==
=== Friendlies ===
==== Pre-season ====
19 June 2021 Friendly	Slaven Gruda	1–9	Hajduk Split	Gruda, Croatia
	Pulić 89' (pen.)	Report	Biuk 37'; Ljubičić 46' 60' 80'; Ćubelić 55'; Livaja 64' 71' 72' 82'	Stadium: Stadion Gnjile

26 June 2021 Friendly	U Craiova 1948 (Romania)	1–2	(Croatia) Hajduk Split	Slovenske Konjice, Slovenia
17:30	Raicea 59'; Zanfir (yellow card) 71'	Report	Elez (yellow card) 53'; Livaja 77'; Ljubičić 82'; Vuković (yellow card) 90'

29 June 2021 Friendly	Śląsk Wrocław (Poland)	0–4	(Croatia) Hajduk Split	Kidričevo, Slovenia
18:00	Mączyński (yellow card) 29'; Verdasca (yellow card) 35'	Report	Brkljača 11'; Vušković 20'; Ljubičić (yellow card) 38'; Jakoliš (yellow card) 40'; Čolina (yellow card) 45'; Atanasov 71'; Šarić 81'	Stadium: Aluminij Sports Park

4 July 2021 Friendly	Aris Thessaloniki (Greece)	1–3	(Croatia) Hajduk Split	Odranci, Slovenia
17:30	Chatzipirpiridis 23'; Benalouane (yellow card) 54'	Report	Livaja 7' (yellow card) 31'; Jairo 72'; Ljubičić 78'

7 July 2021 Friendly	Celje (Slovenia)	3–0	(Croatia) Hajduk Split	Celje, Slovenia
19:00	Medved 52' 73'; Brecl 89'	Report		Stadium: Stadion Z'dežele

8 July 2021 Friendly	Hajduk Split (Croatia)	1–0	(Romania) UTA Arad	Slovenske Konjice, Slovenia
10:30	Jairo (yellow card) 30' (goal) 40'	Report

12 July 2021 Friendly	Hajduk Split (Croatia)	1–3	(Bosnia and Herzegovina) Zrinjski Mostar	Split, Croatia
21:00	Eduok 39'; Vušković (yellow card) 62'; Čuić (yellow card) 64'	Report	Bilbija 17' 23'; Juranović (yellow card) 66'; Malekinušić (yellow card) 80'; Gadže (yellow card) 80'; Mašić 90+6'	Stadium: Stadion Poljud; Attendance: 3,150; Referee: Duje Strukan (Split)

==== On-season (2021) ====
23 August 2021 Friendly	GOŠK Kaštela	1–3	Hajduk Split	Kaštel Gomilica, Croatia
17:45	Maretić 61'	Report	Brkljača 22'; Ljubičić 59'; Domančić 70'	Stadium: SC Jure Bakotić; Attendance: 700; Referee: Mateo Budić

4 September 2021 Friendly	Zmaj Makarska	0–2	Hajduk Split	Makarska, Croatia
17:00		Report	Diamantakos 60'; Eduok 69'	Stadium: Gradski sportski centar Attendance: 2,000; Referee: Marino Majstrović (Split)

9 October 2021 Friendly	Zadar	0–6	Hajduk Split	Zadar, Croatia
17:00		Report	Diamantakos 28', 50'; Katić 30'; Fossati 44'; Kačaniklić 59'; Mlakar 70'	Stadium: Stadion Stanovi; Attendance: 2,500; Referee: Ivan Vukančić

==== Mid-season ====
9 January 2022 Friendly	Hajduk Split (Croatia)	Cancelled	(Netherlands) Ajax	Algarve, Portugal
14:30		Report		Stadium: Estádio Algarve

16 January 2022 Friendly	Hajduk Split (Croatia)	2–1	(Bosnia and Herzegovina) Široki Brijeg	Split, Croatia
14:30	Dolček 26'; Čolina (yellow card) 30'; Brkljača 72'	Report	Mujan 27'; Jurica (yellow card) 64'	Stadium: Stadion Poljud; Attendance: 2,151; Referee: Marino Majstrović (Split)

22 January 2022 Friendly	Hajduk Split (Croatia)	1–1	(Bosnia and Herzegovina) Velež Mostar	Split, Croatia
13:00	Livaja 59'	Report	Vehabović (yellow card) 75'; Ovčina (yellow card) 85'; Pršeš 89'	Stadium: Stadion Poljud; Attendance: 1,252; Referee: Ante Terzić (Split)

25 January 2022 Friendly	Hajduk Split	4–2	Varaždin	Split, Croatia
14:30	Ljubičić 7'; Vuković (yellow card) 38'; Livaja 56'; Kačaniklić 70'; Mlakar 77'	Report	Vuk 17'; Šego 27'; Senić (yellow card) 34'; Belcar (yellow card) 84'	Stadium: Stadion Poljud; Attendance: 511; Referee: Duje Strukan (Split)

==== On-season (2022) ====
27 March 2022 Friendly	Hajduk Split (Croatia)	5–2	(Slovenia) Radomlje	Split, Croatia
14:00	Melnjak 15'; Katić 27'; Kačaniklić 30', 57'; Mikanović 41'	Report	Pogačar 17'; Mužek 60'	Stadium: Stadion Poljud; Attendance: 500; Referee: Marino Majstrović (Split)

1 May 2022 Global Tour for Peace	Hajduk Split (Croatia)	3–3	(Ukraine) Shakhtar Donetsk	Split, Croatia
15:00	Ljubičić 10', 80'; Lazar 49'; Letaj (yellow card) 72'	Report	Sudakov (yellow card) 43'; Topalov 59'; Stasyuk 74'; Boryachuk 90+2'	Stadium: Stadion Poljud; Attendance: 6,000; Referee: Jelena Pejković (Split)

=== HT Prva liga ===
17 July 2021 1	Lokomotiva	2–2	Hajduk Split	Zagreb
18:55 CEST (UTC+02:00)	Soldo 42'; Dabro 47'; Kačavenda (yellow card) 68'; Marić (yellow card) 84'	Report	Mlakar 30', 55'	Stadium: Stadion Kranjčevićeva; Attendance: 1,000; Referee: Tihomir Pejin (Donji Miholjac)

25 July 2021 2	Hajduk Split	1–2	Osijek	Split
21:00 CEST (UTC+02:00)	Krovinović (yellow card) 23'; Livaja (yellow card) 24' (goal) 63'; Vušković (yellow card) 39'; Vuković (yellow card) 55'; Atanasov (yellow card) 90+6'	Report	Škorić (yellow card) 11'; Jurčević 66'; Pilj 87'	Stadium: Stadion Poljud; Attendance: 9,486; Referee: Igor Pajač (Sveti Ivan Zelina)

1 August 2021 3	Hajduk Split	1–0	Šibenik	Split
18:55 CEST (UTC+02:00)	Eduok 27'; Dolček (yellow card) 76'; Sahiti (yellow card) 83'; Simić (yellow card) 90+5'	Report	Ćurić (yellow card) 20'; Bilić (yellow card) 53'; Mesa (yellow card) 58'; Kvesić (yellow card) 77'; Delić (yellow card) 90+1'; Rogić (yellow card) 90+6'	Stadium: Stadion Poljud; Attendance: 5,163; Referee: Fran Jović (Zagreb)

7 August 2021 4	Gorica	1–3	Hajduk Split	Velika Gorica
21:00 CEST (UTC+02:00)	Fruk (yellow card) 35'; Lovrić 56' (yellow card) 87'; Muhammed (yellow card) 79'; Pršir (yellow card) 81'	Report	Mlakar 31'; Vuković 45+1' (yellow card) 51'; Livaja 87'	Stadium: Stadion Radnik; Attendance: 1,576; Referee: Mario Zebec (Cestica)

14 August 2021 5	Hajduk Split	2–0	Slaven Belupo	Split
21:00 CEST (UTC+02:00)	Sahiti 35' (yellow card) 53'; Livaja 48'	Report	Lulić (yellow card) 5'; Bogojević (yellow card) 51'; Goda (yellow card) 81'	Stadium: Stadion Poljud; Attendance: 6,806; Referee: Ivan Bebek (Rijeka)

20 August 2021 6	Hrvatski Dragovoljac	0–1	Hajduk Split	Zagreb
20:00 CEST (UTC+02:00)	Šubarić (yellow card) 68'	Report	Simić 90+5'	Stadium: Stadion Kranjčevićeva; Attendance: 990; Referee: Zdenko Lovrić (Đakovo)

29 August 2021 7	Hajduk Split	1–2	Rijeka	Split
21:00 CEST (UTC+02:00)	Elez (yellow card) 35' (goal) 54'; Krovinović (yellow card) 51'	Report	Tomečak 21'; Drmić 43' (yellow card) 61'; Selahi (yellow card) 55'; Velkovski (yellow card) 90+4'	Stadium: Stadion Poljud; Attendance: 15,967; Referee: Fran Jović (Zagreb)

12 September 2021 8	Istra 1961	1–3	Hajduk Split	Pula
17:00 CEST (UTC+02:00)	Mahmoud (yellow card) 45'; Beljo 88'; Daničić (yellow card) 90'; Bandé (yellow card) 90+4'	Report	Krovinović (yellow card) 39'; Livaja 52' (pen.) 58' (pen.) 74'	Stadium: Stadion Aldo Drosina; Attendance: 1,761; Referee: Dario Bel (Osijek)

26 September 2021 10	Hajduk Split	1–0	Lokomotiva	Split
19:05 CEST (UTC+02:00)	Livaja (yellow card) 9' (goal) 80'; Simić (yellow card) 41'	Report	Maleš (yellow card) 41'; Kačavenda (yellow card) 56'; Marić (yellow card) 63'; Pivarić (yellow card) 70'; de Haas (yellow card) 78'; Cipetić (yellow card) 90+2'	Stadium: Stadion Poljud; Attendance: 7,657; Referee: Ivan Bebek (Rijeka)

3 October 2021 11	Osijek	1–1	Hajduk Split	Osijek
19:30 CEST (UTC+02:00)	Kleinheisler 10'; Hiroš (yellow card) 41'; Jugović (yellow card) 66'; Žaper (yellow card) 85'	Report	Lončar 19' (o.g.); Livaja (yellow card) 66'	Stadium: Stadion Gradski vrt Attendance: 5,118; Referee: Igor Pajač (Sveti Ivan Zelina)

17 October 2021 12	Šibenik	2–0	Hajduk Split	Šibenik
17:30 CEST (UTC+02:00)	Mina 25'; Bačelić-Grgić (yellow card) 40'; Ćurić (yellow card) 74' (goal) 84' (pen.); Batarelo (yellow card) 90+4'	Report		Stadium: Stadion Šubićevac; Attendance: 1,668; Referee: Zdenko Lovrić (Đakovo)

23 October 2021 13	Hajduk Split	0–0	Gorica	Split
17:05 CEST (UTC+02:00)	Simić (yellow card) 90+2'	Report	Sarić (yellow card) 83'; Krizmanić (yellow card) 90+1'	Stadium: Stadion Poljud; Attendance: 5,406; Referee: Ante Čuljak (Zagreb)

31 October 2021 14	Slaven Belupo	3–2	Hajduk Split	Koprivnica
15:00 CET (UTC+01:00)	Laušić 2'; Krstanović 34' (yellow card) 87'; Mlinarić 84' (yellow card) 90+5'; Čović (yellow card) 90+6'	Report	Fossati (yellow card) 36'; Katić (yellow card) 45'; Kačaniklić (yellow card) 64'; Livaja 66'; Biuk 86'	Stadium: Gradski Stadion Ivan Kušek Apaš; Attendance: 1,613; Referee: Fran Jović (Zagreb)

6 November 2021 15	Hajduk Split	2–0	Hrvatski Dragovoljac	Split
17:05 CET (UTC+01:00)	Ljubičić 29'; Elez (yellow card) 60'; Sahiti 67'	Report	Vuco (yellow card) 87'	Stadium: Stadion Poljud; Attendance: 3,240; Referee: Ivana Martinčić (Koprivnica)

21 November 2021 16	Rijeka	2–3	Hajduk Split	Rijeka
17:30 CET (UTC+01:00)	Drmić 54'; Murić 78' (pen.); Ampem (yellow card) 81'	Report	Livaja 45', 82' (pen.) (yellow card) 45'; Simić (yellow card) 72'; Katić (yellow card) 77'; Mlakar 90+7'	Stadium: Stadion Rujevica; Attendance: 6,578; Referee: Tihomir Pejin (Donji Miholjac)

26 November 2021 17	Hajduk Split	4–0	Istra 1961	Split
20:00 CET (UTC+01:00)	Ljubičić 11'; Fossati 27' (yellow card) 29'; Krovinović 70'; Livaja 90+2'	Report	Perera (yellow card) 11'; Beljo (yellow card) 43'	Stadium: Stadion Poljud; Attendance: 4,560; Referee: Fran Jović (Zagreb)

5 December 2021 18	Dinamo Zagreb	0–2	Hajduk Split	Zagreb
17:30 CET (UTC+01:00)		Report	Livaja 60'; Lovrencsics (yellow card) 69'; Sahiti 90+4'; Dolček (yellow card) 90+5'	Stadium: Stadion Maksimir; Attendance: 9,914; Referee: Zdenko Lovrić (Đakovo)

11 December 2021 19	Lokomotiva	3–3	Hajduk Split	Zagreb
15:00 CET (UTC+01:00)	Elez 11' (o.g.); Mersinaj (yellow card) 48'; Marić 63' (yellow card) 69'; Kačavenda (yellow card) 83'; Katić 86' (o.g.)	Report	Livaja 34'; Mlakar 77', 81'; Katić (yellow card) 78'	Stadium: Stadion Kranjčevićeva; Attendance: 2,776; Referee: Tihomir Pejin (Donji Miholjac)

19 December 2021 20	Hajduk Split	0–0	Osijek	Split
17:30 CET (UTC+01:00)	L. Kalinić (yellow card) 21'; Lovrencsics (yellow card) 60'	Report	Bohar (penalty missed) 13'; Miloš (yellow card) 21'; Cheberko (yellow card) 27'; Bohar (yellow card) 45'; Pilj (yellow card) 90+6'	Stadium: Stadion Poljud; Attendance: 30,524; Referee: Fran Jović (Zagreb)

29 January 2022 21	Šibenik	1–3	Hajduk Split	Šibenik
17:05 CET (UTC+01:00)	Rak (yellow card) 7'; Ćurić 24'; Skorup (yellow card) 65'	Report	Livaja 15' (pen.), 45' (pen.); Fossati (yellow card) 29'; Vuković (yellow card) 51'; Krovinović 68'	Stadium: Stadion Šubićevac; Attendance: 1,156; Referee: Mario Zebec (Cestica)

5 February 2022 22	Gorica	0–4	Hajduk Split	Velika Gorica
15:00 CET (UTC+01:00)	Steenvoorden (yellow card) 73'; Babec (yellow card) 79'	Report	Ferro 3'; Livaja 39' (pen.), 82'; Mlakar 58'	Stadium: Stadion Radnik; Attendance: 1,600; Referee: Tihomir Pejin (Donji Miholjac)

13 February 2022 23	Hajduk Split	3–1	Slaven Belupo	Split
15:00 CET (UTC+01:00)	Sahiti 13'; Grgić 26'; Livaja 71' (pen.); Katić (yellow card) 78'	Report	Zapata 52'; Bosec (yellow card) 58' (yellow-red card) 62'; Goda (yellow card) 65'	Stadium: Stadion Poljud; Attendance: 9,759; Referee: Ante Čuljak (Zagreb)

19 February 2022 24	Hrvatski Dragovoljac	0–3	Hajduk Split	Zagreb
15:00 CET (UTC+01:00)	Frigan (yellow card) 18'; Bristrić (yellow card) 24'; Karrica (yellow card) 54'	Report	Livaja 32' (pen.), 74' (pen.), 79'; Katić (yellow card) 53'	Stadium: Stadion Kranjčevićeva; Attendance: 1,650; Referee: Dario Bel (Osijek)

26 February 2022 25	Hajduk Split	1–3	Rijeka	Split
18:00 CET (UTC+01:00)	Grgić (yellow card) 35'; N. Kalinić (yellow card) 38'; Livaja 69'; Biuk (yellow card) 90'; Fossati (yellow card) 90+1'	Report	Drmić 17'; Vučkić 33'; Smolčić (yellow card) 38'; Solano (yellow card) 41'; Ampem (yellow card) 63'; Krešić 86'	Stadium: Stadion Poljud; Attendance: 11,453; Referee: Fran Jović (Zagreb)

6 March 2022 26	Istra 1961	1–1	Hajduk Split	Pula
17:05 CET (UTC+01:00)	Beljo 54'; Mahmoud (yellow card) 70'	Report	N. Kalinić 30' (yellow card) 61'; Mikanović (yellow card) 63'	Stadium: Stadion Aldo Drosina; Attendance: 3,981; Referee: Tihomir Pejin (Donji Miholjac)

12 March 2022 27	Hajduk Split	0–0	Dinamo Zagreb	Split
18:00 CET (UTC+01:00)	Vuković (yellow card) 72'	Report	Petković (yellow card) 66'; Mišić (yellow card) 83'; Štefulj (yellow card) 88'	Stadium: Stadion Poljud; Attendance: 30,129; Referee: Dario Bel (Osijek)

19 March 2022 28	Hajduk Split	4–0	Lokomotiva	Split
17:05 CET (UTC+01:00)	N. Kalinić 22'; Krovinović 43'; Melnjak 54'; Sahiti 62'; Lovrencsics (yellow card) 79'; Ljubičić (yellow card) 90'	Report	Pivarić (yellow card) 33'; Maleš (yellow card) 45+2'; Dabro (yellow card) 56'; Mersinaj (yellow card) 90+1'	Stadium: Stadion Poljud; Attendance: 11,873; Referee: Igor Pajač (Sveti Ivan Zelina)

3 April 2022 29	Osijek	0–0	Hajduk Split	Osijek
19:30 CEST (UTC+02:00)	Lovrić (yellow card) 6'; Caktaš (penalty missed) 33'; Miérez (yellow card) 34'; Caktaš (yellow card) 55'; Cheberko (yellow card) 80'; Žaper (yellow card) 90+3'	Report	Ferro (yellow card) 32'; Livaja (yellow card) 45+6'	Stadium: Stadion Gradski vrt Attendance: 7,181; Referee: Fran Jović (Zagreb)

9 April 2022 30	Hajduk Split	2–1	Šibenik	Split
19:05 CEST (UTC+02:00)	Krovinović 32'; Biuk (yellow card) 45'; Mlakar (yellow card) 67'; Elez 87'; Fossati (yellow card) 90+3'	Report	Bilić (yellow card) 33'; Rogić (yellow card) 33'; Šimunović (yellow card) 48'; Ćurić 54'; Skorup (yellow card) 90+3'	Stadium: Stadion Poljud; Attendance: 8,645; Referee: Ante Čuljak (Zagreb)

15 April 2022 31	Hajduk Split	1–0	Gorica	Split
20:05 CEST (UTC+02:00)	Jovičić 13' (o.g.); Krovinović (yellow card) 45'; Katić (yellow card) 79'	Report	Keita (yellow card) 58'	Stadium: Stadion Poljud; Attendance: 11,482; Referee: Tihomir Pejin (Donji Miholjac)

20 April 2022 9	Hajduk Split	1–0	Dinamo Zagreb	Split
19:00 CEST (UTC+02:00)	N. Kalinić 63' (yellow card) 63'; Livaja (yellow card) 89'; L. Kalinić (yellow card) 90+5'	Report	Théophile-Catherine (yellow card) 51'	Stadium: Stadion Poljud; Attendance: 30,038; Referee: Igor Pajač (Sveti Ivan Zelina)

24 April 2022 32	Slaven Belupo	0–0	Hajduk Split	Koprivnica
17:00 CEST (UTC+02:00)	Marina (yellow card) 22'; Zvonarek (yellow card) 44'	Report	Katić (yellow card) 11'; Biuk (yellow card) 45'; Fossati (yellow card) 78'; Krovinović (yellow card) 82'; Simić (yellow card) 90+3'	Stadium: Gradski Stadion Ivan Kušek Apaš; Attendance: 3,200; Referee: Fran Jović (Zagreb)

29 April 2022 33	Hajduk Split	2–1	Hrvatski Dragovoljac	Split
18:00 CEST (UTC+02:00)	N. Kalinić 6'; Grgić (yellow card) 72'; Livaja 87'	Report	Frigan 51'; Bristrić (yellow card) 72'; Brtan (yellow card) 81'	Stadium: Stadion Poljud; Attendance: 9,775; Referee: Ivana Martinčić (Koprivnica)

8 May 2022 34	Rijeka	0–3	Hajduk Split	Rijeka
17:00 CEST (UTC+02:00)	Krešić (yellow card) 12'; Drmić (red card) 55'; Smolčić (yellow card) 73'	Report	Livaja 13' (pen.), 37'; Mikanović 41'; Lovrencsics (yellow card) 85'	Stadium: Stadion Rujevica; Attendance: 7,485; Referee: Dario Bel (Osijek)

14 May 2022 35	Hajduk Split	3–1	Istra 1961	Split
19:05 CEST (UTC+02:00)	Livaja (yellow card) 32' (goal) 45+2' (pen.), 52' (pen.); Krovinović 54'	Report	Mahmoud 15' (yellow card) 16' (yellow-red card) 45+4'; Blagojević (yellow card) 45+1'; Cáseres (yellow card) 50'; Perković (yellow card) 69'	Stadium: Stadion Poljud; Attendance: 16,056; Referee: Zdenko Lovrić (Đakovo)

21 May 2022 36	Dinamo Zagreb	3–1	Hajduk Split	Zagreb
20:00 CEST (UTC+02:00)	Petković 53'; Oršić 90+9'; Baturina 90+10'	Report	Livaja 90+4'	Stadium: Stadion Maksimir; Attendance: 18,353; Referee: Patrik Kolarić (Čakovec)

=== Croatian Cup ===
21 September 2021 R1	Primorac Biograd na Moru	1–2	Hajduk Split	Biograd na Moru
17:00 CEST (UTC+02:00)	Lazarevski 12' (pen.)	Report	Krovinović 42'; Ljubičić 60'	Stadium: Kažimira i Silvija; Attendance: 1,400; Referee: Fran Jović (Zagreb)

26 October 2021 R2	Belišće	1–5	Hajduk Split	Belišće
15:00 CEST (UTC+02:00)	Anočić 5'; Jurič (yellow card) 40'	Report	Livaja 4', 57', 68'; Ljubičić 35', 58' (yellow card) 52'	Stadium: Gradski stadion Belišće; Attendance: 2,200; Referee: Ivan Vučković (Zagreb)

30 November 2021 QF	Lokomotiva	3–6	Hajduk Split	Zagreb
18:30 CET (UTC+01:00)	Pivarić 45+2' (pen.); Dabro 59'; Tuci (yellow card) 83'; Elez 90+4' (o.g.)	Report	Krovinović 7'; Atanasov 51', 56'; Ljubičić 53'; Livaja 57'; Sahiti 90'	Stadium: Stadion Kranjčevićeva; Attendance: 1,603; Referee: Dario Bel (Osijek)

2 March 2022 SF	Hajduk Split	2–1	Gorica	Split
17:30 CET (UTC+01:00)	Melnjak 39', 64'	Report	Dieye (yellow card) 48'; Kalik 90+4' (pen.)	Stadium: Stadion Poljud; Attendance: 13,063; Referee: Zdenko Lovrić (Đakovo)

26 May 2022 Final	Rijeka	1–3	Hajduk Split	Split
19:00 CEST (UTC+02:00)	Drmić 13'; Smolčić (yellow card) 26' (yellow-red card) 41'; Selahi (yellow card) 35'	Report	Ferro 24'; Fossati (yellow card) 26'; Melnjak 36', 56'; Grgić (yellow card) 45'	Stadium: Stadion Poljud; Attendance: 29,411; Referee: Fran Jović (Zagreb)

=== UEFA Europa Conference League ===
==== Second qualifying round ====
22 July 2021 First leg	Hajduk Split (Croatia)	2–0	(Kazakhstan) Tobol	Split, Croatia
21:00 CEST (UTC+02:00)	Ljubičić 21', 53' (yellow card) 51'	Report	Amanović (yellow card) 39'; Kairov (yellow card) 43'	Stadium: Stadion Poljud; Attendance: 11,141; Referee: Christian Dingert (Germany)

29 July 2021 Second leg	Tobol (Kazakhstan)	4–1 (a.e.t.) (4–3 agg.)	(Croatia) Hajduk Split	Kostanay, Kazakhstan
21:00 OMST (UTC+06:00)	Kairov (yellow card) 31'; Jovančić (yellow card) 37' (goal) 56'; Sergeyev 61', 67'; Valiullin (yellow card) 81'; Tagybergen 118'	Report	Vušković (yellow card) 14'; Krovinović (penalty missed) 70'; Sahiti 90+4'; Simić (yellow card) 94'	Stadium: Central Stadium; Attendance: 2,000; Referee: Vladimir Moskalev (Russia)

== Player seasonal records ==
Updated 27 May 2022

=== Goals ===
Rank	Name	League	Europe	Cup	Total
1	(Croatia) Marko Livaja	28	–	4	32
2	(Croatia) Marin Ljubičić	2	2	4	8
3	(Slovenia) Jan Mlakar	7	–	–	7
3	(Kosovo) Emir Sahiti	5	1	1	7
3	(Croatia) Filip Krovinović	5	–	2	7
6	(Croatia) Dario Melnjak	1	–	4	5
7	(Croatia) Nikola Kalinić	4	–	–	4
8	(Croatia) Josip Elez	2	–	–	2
8	(Portugal) Ferro	1	–	1	2
8	(North Macedonia) Jani Atanasov	–	–	2	2
11	(Croatia) Stipe Biuk	1	–	–	1
11	(Nigeria) Samuel Eduok	1	–	–	1
11	(Italy) Marco Fossati	1	–	–	1
11	(Austria) Lukas Grgić	1	–	–	1
11	(Croatia) Dino Mikanović	1	–	–	1
11	(Czech Republic) Stefan Simić	1	–	–	1
11	(Croatia) Josip Vuković	1	–	–	1
Own goals		2	–	–	2
TOTALS		64	3	18	85

Source: Competitive matches

=== Clean sheets ===
Rank	Name	League	Europe	Cup	Total
1	(Croatia) Lovre Kalinić	15	1	–	16
2	(Croatia) Josip Posavec	2	–	–	2
3	(Croatia) Danijel Subašić	1	–	–	1
TOTALS		18	1	0	19

Source: Competitive matches

=== Disciplinary record ===
Number	Position	Player	1. HNL			Conference League			Croatian Cup			Total		
Number	Position	Player	Yellow card	(yellow card) (yellow-red card)	Red card	Yellow card	(yellow card) (yellow-red card)	Red card	Yellow card	(yellow card) (yellow-red card)	Red card	Yellow card	(yellow card) (yellow-red card)	Red card
2	DF	(Croatia) Nikola Katić	7	0	0	0	0	0	0	0	0	7	0	0
4	MF	(Croatia) Josip Vuković	4	0	0	0	0	0	0	0	0	4	0	0
6	MF	(Italy) Marco Fossati	6	0	0	0	0	0	1	0	0	7	0	0
7	FW	(Sweden) Alexander Kačaniklić	1	0	0	0	0	0	0	0	0	1	0	0
8	DF	(Czech Republic) Stefan Simić	5	0	0	1	0	0	0	0	0	6	0	0
9	FW	(Croatia) Nikola Kalinić	3	0	0	0	0	0	0	0	0	3	0	0
10	FW	(Croatia) Marko Livaja	7	0	0	0	0	0	0	0	0	7	0	0
14	MF	(Austria) Lukas Grgić	2	0	0	0	0	0	1	0	0	3	0	0
19	DF	(Croatia) Josip Elez	2	0	0	0	0	0	0	0	0	2	0	0
20	MF	(North Macedonia) Jani Atanasov	1	0	0	0	0	0	0	0	0	1	0	0
23	MF	(Croatia) Filip Krovinović	5	0	0	0	0	0	0	0	0	5	0	0
24	DF	(Croatia) Dino Mikanović	1	0	0	0	0	0	0	0	0	1	0	0
26	DF	(Hungary) Gergő Lovrencsics	4	0	0	0	0	0	0	0	0	4	0	0
27	FW	(Croatia) Stipe Biuk	3	0	0	0	0	0	0	0	0	3	0	0
29	FW	(Slovenia) Jan Mlakar	1	0	0	0	0	0	0	0	0	1	0	0
31	DF	(Croatia) Ivan Dolček	2	0	0	0	0	0	0	0	0	2	0	0
44	DF	(Croatia) Mario Vušković	1	0	0	1	0	0	0	0	0	2	0	0
77	MF	(Kosovo) Emir Sahiti	2	0	0	0	0	0	0	0	0	2	0	0
90	FW	(Croatia) Marin Ljubičić	1	0	0	1	0	0	1	0	0	3	0	0
91	GK	(Croatia) Lovre Kalinić	2	0	0	0	0	0	0	0	0	2	0	0
97	DF	(Portugal) Ferro	1	0	0	0	0	0	0	0	0	1	0	0
TOTALS			60	0	0	3	0	0	3	0	0	66	0	0

=== Appearances and goals ===
Number	Position	Player	Apps	Goals	Apps	Goals	Apps	Goals	Apps	Goals
Number	Position	Player	Total		1. HNL (Note: First number represents appearances in starting eleven, while the second number indicates a substitute appearance.)		Conference League		Croatian Cup	
1	GK	(Croatia) Danijel Subašić	6	0	3+1	0	0+0	0	1+1	0
2	DF	(Croatia) Nikola Katić	25	0	17+4	0	0+0	0	3+1	0
3	DF	(Croatia) David Čolina	37	0	14+17	0	2+0	0	1+3	0
4	MF	(Croatia) Josip Vuković	28	1	17+7	1	2+0	0	0+2	0
5	DF	(Bulgaria) Kristian Dimitrov	10	0	1+5	0	0+1	0	2+1	0
6	MF	(Italy) Marco Fossati	30	1	22+4	1	0+0	0	3+1	0
7	FW	(Sweden) Alexander Kačaniklić	12	0	2+8	0	0+0	0	1+1	0
8	DF	(Czech Republic) Stefan Simić	26	1	13+9	1	2+0	0	1+1	0
9	FW	(Croatia) Nikola Kalinić	12	4	9+2	4	0+0	0	0+1	0
10	FW	(Croatia) Marko Livaja	40	32	33+1	28	1+0	0	4+1	4
11	FW	(Nigeria) Samuel Eduok	4	1	2+2	1	0+0	0	0+0	0
13	MF	(Croatia) Marko Brkljača	3	0	0+2	0	0+0	0	0+1	0
14	MF	(Croatia) Mario Čuić	6	0	1+4	0	0+1	0	0+0	0
14	MF	(Austria) Lukas Grgić	14	1	11+1	1	0+0	0	2+0	0
15	DF	(Croatia) Ivan Ćalušić	6	0	1+3	0	0+0	0	2+0	0
16	DF	(Kosovo) Lumbardh Dellova	3	0	0+3	0	0+0	0	0+0	0
17	DF	(Croatia) Dario Melnjak	32	5	23+5	1	0+0	0	3+1	4
18	FW	(Greece) Dimitrios Diamantakos	8	0	1+4	0	0+2	0	1+0	0
19	DF	(Croatia) Josip Elez	36	2	31+0	2	1+1	0	3+0	0
20	MF	(North Macedonia) Jani Atanasov	27	2	8+13	0	0+2	0	3+1	2
21	FW	(Brazil) Jairo	6	0	0+4	0	1+1	0	0+0	0
21	MF	(United States) Rokas Pukštas	1	0	1+0	0	0+0	0	0+0	0
23	MF	(Croatia) Filip Krovinović	32	7	27+0	5	2+0	0	3+0	2
24	DF	(Croatia) Dino Mikanović	18	1	11+5	1	0+0	0	2+0	0
26	DF	(Hungary) Gergő Lovrencsics	34	0	24+6	0	2+0	0	2+0	0
27	FW	(Croatia) Stipe Biuk	34	1	21+7	1	0+1	0	4+1	0
29	FW	(Slovenia) Jan Mlakar	33	7	15+12	7	2+0	0	2+2	0
31	MF	(Croatia) Roko Brajković	1	0	0+1	0	0+0	0	0+0	0
31	DF	(Croatia) Ivan Dolček	13	0	4+5	0	0+2	0	1+1	0
44	DF	(Croatia) Mario Vušković	4	0	2+1	0	1+0	0	0+0	0
70	GK	(Croatia) Josip Posavec	4	0	4+0	0	0+0	0	0+0	0
77	MF	(Kosovo) Emir Sahiti	39	7	24+8	5	2+0	1	3+2	1
88	MF	(Croatia) Ivan Ćubelić	1	0	0+1	0	0+0	0	0+0	0
90	FW	(Croatia) Marin Ljubičić	36	8	12+18	2	2+0	2	3+1	4
91	GK	(Croatia) Lovre Kalinić	35	0	29+0	0	2+0	0	4+0	0
97	DF	(Portugal) Ferro	14	2	13+0	1	0+0	0	1+0	1

== Transfers ==
=== In ===
Date	Position	Player	From	Fee
23 May 2021	FW	(Croatia) Leon Kreković	(Croatia) Dugopolje	Loan ended
28 May 2021	DF	(Croatia) Josip Elez	(Germany) Hannover 96	Free
1 June 2021	MF	(Albania) Emir Sahiti	(Croatia) Šibenik	Loan ended
23 June 2021	MF	(Croatia) Josip Vuković	(Croatia) Osijek	Free
27 June 2021	DF	(Kosovo) Lumbardh Dellova	(Kosovo) Prishtina	Loan ended
30 June 2021	FW	(Croatia) Michele Šego	(Croatia) Dugopolje	Loan ended
1 July 2021	FW	(Slovenia) Jan Mlakar	(England) Brighton & Hove Albion	300,000 €
5 July 2021	DF	(Hungary) Gergő Lovrencsics	(Hungary) Ferencváros	Free
11 July 2021	GK	(Croatia) Lovre Kalinić	(England) Aston Villa	Loan
19 July 2021	MF	(Croatia) Filip Krovinović	(Portugal) Benfica	1,500,000 €
17 August 2021	MF	(Croatia) Dino Skorup	(Croatia) Hrvatski Dragovoljac	Loan ended
17 August 2021	MF	(Croatia) Tonio Teklić	(Croatia) Hrvatski Dragovoljac	Loan ended
31 August 2021	DF	(Croatia) Nikola Katić	(Scotland) Rangers	Loan
31 August 2021	MF	(Italy) Marco Fossati	(Italy) Monza	Free
22 September 2021	GK	(Croatia) Danijel Subašić	Free agent	Free
23 September 2021	DF	(Croatia) Dario Melnjak	Free agent	Free
10 January 2022	MF	(Austria) Lukas Grgić	(Austria) LASK Linz	100,000 €
25 January 2022	FW	(Croatia) Marin Jakoliš	(Croatia) Šibenik	Loan ended
28 January 2022	DF	(Croatia) Dino Mikanović	(Kazakhstan) Kairat	75,000 €
31 January 2022	DF	(Portugal) Ferro	(Portugal) Benfica	Loan
2 February 2022	GK	(Croatia) Vice Baždarić	(Croatia) Opatija	Loan ended
6 February 2022	FW	(Croatia) Nikola Kalinić	(Italy) Hellas Verona	Free
8 February 2022	DF	(Croatia) Ante Bekavac	(Croatia) Dugopolje	Loan ended

Total Spending: ▼1,975,000 €

=== Out ===
Date	Position	Player	To	Fee
1 June 2021	DF	(Bosnia and Herzegovina) Nihad Mujakić	(Belgium) Kortrijk	Loan ended
1 June 2021	DF	(Bosnia and Herzegovina) Darko Todorović	(Austria) Red Bull Salzburg	Loan ended
1 June 2021	MF	(Italy) Marco Fossati	(Italy) Monza	Loan ended
1 June 2021	FW	(Turkey) Umut Nayir	(Turkey) Beşiktaş	Loan ended
5 June 2021	FW	(Croatia) Leon Kreković	(Belgium) Beerschot	200,000 €
18 June 2021	MF	(Croatia) Stanko Jurić	(Italy) Parma	2,000,000 €
19 June 2021	DF	(Croatia) Vicko Ševelj	(Bosnia and Herzegovina) Sarajevo	End of contract
21 June 2021	MF	(Croatia) Darko Nejašmić	(Croatia) Osijek	Loan
25 June 2021	FW	(Nigeria) Stephen Chinedu	(Albania) Dinamo Tirana	Free
1 July 2021	DF	(Croatia) Božo Mikulić		End of contract
1 July 2021	MF	(Croatia) Mijo Caktaš		End of contract
5 July 2021	MF	(Croatia) Dino Skorup	(Croatia) Hrvatski Dragovoljac	Loan
5 July 2021	MF	(Croatia) Tonio Teklić	(Croatia) Hrvatski Dragovoljac	Loan
10 July 2021	GK	(Croatia) Karlo Sentić	(Croatia) Varaždin	Loan
10 July 2021	FW	(Croatia) Michele Šego	(Croatia) Varaždin	Loan
19 July 2021	GK	(Croatia) Vice Baždarić	(Croatia) Opatija	Loan
17 December 2021	DF	(Croatia) Ante Bekavac	(Croatia) Dugopolje	Loan
21 July 2021	FW	(Croatia) Marin Jakoliš	(Croatia) Šibenik	Loan
19 August 2021	FW	(Brazil) Jairo	(Cyprus) Pafos	500,000 €
27 August 2021	MF	(Croatia) Ivan Ćubelić	(Croatia) Dugopolje	Loan
31 August 2021	DF	(Croatia) Mario Vušković	(Germany) Hamburger SV	Loan (fee: 1,200,000 €)
31 August 2021	MF	(Croatia) Tonio Teklić	(Croatia) Varaždin	Loan
31 August 2021	FW	(Croatia) Ivan Brnić	(Croatia) Dugopolje	Free
17 December 2021	DF	(Kosovo) Lumbardh Dellova	(Kosovo) Ballkani	Free
4 January 2022	FW	(Greece) Dimitrios Diamantakos	(Israel) Ashdod	Loan
19 January 2022	DF	(Croatia) Ivan Ćalušić	(Slovenia) Radomlje	Loan
20 January 2022	MF	(Croatia) Mario Čuić	(Slovenia) Radomlje	Loan
28 January 2022	MF	(Croatia) Dino Skorup	(Croatia) Šibenik	Loan
29 January 2022	FW	(Croatia) Marin Jakoliš	(France) Angers	500,000 €
31 January 2022	MF	(Croatia) Ivan Dolček	(Portugal) Famalicão	Loan
2 February 2022	DF	(Croatia) Luka Škaričić	(Croatia) Varaždin	Loan
3 February 2022	GK	(Croatia) Vice Baždarić	(Croatia) Cibalia	Loan
7 February 2022	DF	(Bulgaria) Kristian Dimitrov	(Romania) CFR Cluj	Loan
9 February 2022	DF	(Croatia) Ante Bekavac	Croatia Zmijavci	Loan

Total Income: ▲4,400,000 €

Total expenditure: ▲2,425,000 €

=== Promoted from youth squad ===
Position	Player	Age
MF	(Croatia) Dino Skorup	21
DF	(Croatia) Luka Škaričić	19
GK	(Croatia) Toni Silić	17
GK	(Croatia) Ivan Perić	19
MF	(Kosovo) Emir Sahiti	22
MF	(Croatia) Ivan Ćubelić	18
DF	(Croatia) Ivan Ćalušić	21
MF	(United States) Rokas Pukštas	17
