= 2021–22 HNK Šibenik season =

HNK Šibenik
2021–22 season
- Chairwoman: Marina Jurić
- Manager: Mario Rosas (2021–2022); Ferdo Milin; Marko Kartelo (interim); Marko Kartelo; Ivica Matas (interim); Dean Računica
- Stadium: Stadion Šubićevac
- Prva HNL: 9th
- Croatian Cup: Second round
Home colours	Away colours

The 2021–22 season is the 50th season in the existence of HNK Šibenik and the 16th consecutive season in the top flight of Croatian football. In addition to the domestic league, HNK Šibenik participated in this season's edition of the Croatian Cup.

== Players ==
=== First-team squad ===
As of 20 March 2022

Note: Flags indicate national team as defined under FIFA eligibility rules; some limited exceptions apply. Players may hold more than one non-FIFA nationality.

No.	Pos.	Nation	Player
1	GK	CRO	Antonio Đaković
2	DF	COL	Juan Camilo Mesa
3	DF	BIH	Josip Kvesić
5	DF	AUT	Stefan Perić
6	DF	CRO	Karlo Bilić
7	MF	KOS	Suad Sahiti
8	MF	CRO	Edin Julardžija (on loan from Dinamo Zagreb)
9	MF	ESP	Burgui
10	MF	CRO	Mario Ćurić (captain)
14	MF	CRO	Stipe Bačelić-Grgić
15	DF	CRO	Ivan Bikić
16	FW	ALB	Eros Grezda
17	DF	COL	Marcos Mina
18	MF	CRO	Ivica Vidović (on loan from Dinamo Zagreb)
19	FW	CRO	Ivan Delić

No.	Pos.	Nation	Player
20	FW	CRO	Antonio Marin (on loan from Dinamo Zagreb)
21	DF	CRO	Viktor Damjanić
22	GK	CRO	Marko Benat
24	DF	CRO	Luka Šimunović
25	DF	AUS	Doni Grdić
27	MF	CRO	Niko Rak
29	DF	CRO	Antonio Asanović
31	DF	CRO	Ante Bolanča
33	DF	FRA	Alexandre Klopp
58	MF	KOS	Mal Mehmeti
70	MF	CRO	Antonio Jakoliš
70	FW	CRO	Duje Škugor
88	MF	CRO	Dino Skorup (on loan from Hajduk Split)
94	MF	HAI	Christopher Attys (on loan from Inter Milan)
95	GK	CRO	Lovre Rogić

== Transfers ==
Date	Player	Position	No.	Last Club	Fee	Ref.
18 August 2021	(India) Sandesh Jhingan	CB	55	(India) ATK Mohun Bagan	Free transfer	

== Pre-season and friendlies ==
Win Draw Loss Fixtures

== Competitions ==
=== Overall record ===
Competition	First match	Last match	Starting round	Final position	Record							
Competition	First match	Last match	Starting round	Final position	Pld	W	D	L	GF	GA	GD	Win %
Prva HNL	16 July 2021	May 2022	Matchday 1		35	9	5	21	45	73	−28	25.71
Croatian Cup	22 September 2021	26 October 2021	First round	Second round	2	1	1	0	2	1	+1	50.00
Total					37	10	6	21	47	74	−27	27.03

Last updated: 15 May 2022
Source: Soccerway

=== Prva HNL ===
==== League table ====
Pos	Team	Pld	W	D	L	GF	GA	GD	Pts	Qualification or relegation
6	Gorica	36	12	9	15	43	50	−7	45	
7	Slaven Belupo	36	9	9	18	35	54	−19	36	
8	Šibenik	36	9	5	22	46	75	−29	32	
9	Istra 1961	36	7	10	19	42	67	−25	31	
10	Hrvatski Dragovoljac (R)	36	4	7	25	31	75	−44	19	Relegation to First Football League

Source: PrvaHNL.hr
Rules for classification: 1) Points; 2) Head-to-head points; 3) Head-to-head goal difference; 4) Head-to-head goals scored (at home if two teams tied); 5) Goal difference; 6) Goals scored; 7) Play-off
(Note: Criteria 2-4 and 7 is only used if deciding champion, teams to international competition or teams for relegation and in that case criteria 6 will not be used).
(R) Relegated

==== Results summary ====
Overall								Home						Away					
Pld	W	D	L	GF	GA	GD	Pts	W	D	L	GF	GA	GD	W	D	L	GF	GA	GD
0	0	0	0	0	0	0	0	0	0	0	0	0	0	0	0	0	0	0	0

Last updated: 23 July 2021.
Source: Prva HNL

==== Results by round ====
Round	1	2	3	4	5	6	7	8	9	10	11	12	13	14	15	16	17	18	19	20	21	22	23	24	25	26	27	28	29	30	31	32	33	34	35	36
Ground	A	A	A	A	H	A	H	A	H	H	H	H	H	A	H	A	H	A	A	A	H	A	H	A	H	A	H	H	H	A	H	A	H	A	H	A
Result	L	L	L	D	W	L	W	L	W	L	L	W	D	D	L	W	L	D	L	W	L	D	L	L	W	L	L	L	L	L	W	L	L	W	L	
Position	9	10																																		

Updated to match(es) played on 15 May 2022. Source: Prva HNL
A = Away; H = Home; W = Win; D = Draw; L = Loss

==== Matches ====
The league fixtures were announced on 8 June 2021.

16 July 2021 1	Osijek	3–0	Šibenik	Osijek
21:00 CEST (UTC+2)	Miloš (yellow card) 26'; Pilj (yellow card) 33'; Miérez 63'; Nejašmić (yellow card) 67'; Bohar 90', 90+5' (pen.)	Report	Jurić (yellow card) 90+1'	Stadium: Gradski Vrt Stadium; Attendance: 551; Referee: Goran Pečarić

24 July 2021 2	Gorica	3–1	Šibenik	Velika Gorica
21:00 CEST (UTC+2)	Babec 27'; Keita (yellow card) 50'; Dieye 66'; Bilić 69' (o.g.); Banić (yellow card) 86'; Fruk (yellow card) 88'	Report	Perić (yellow card) 43'; Julardžija (yellow card) 72'; Bilić 87'; Jurić (yellow card) 90+2'	Stadium: Stadion Radnik; Attendance: 400; Referee: Duje Strukan

1 August 2021 3	Hajduk Split	1–0	Šibenik	Split
18:55 CEST (UTC+2)	Eduok 27'; Dolček (yellow card) 76'; Sahiti (yellow card) 83'; Simić (yellow card) 90+5'	Report	Ćurić (yellow card) 20'; Bilić (yellow card) 53'; Mesa (yellow card) 58'; Kvesić (yellow card) 77'; Delić (yellow card) 90+1'; Rogić (yellow card) 90+6'	Stadium: Stadion Poljud; Attendance: 5,163; Referee: Fran Jović

22 August 2021 6	Rijeka	2–1	Šibenik	Rijeka
21:00 CEST (UTC+2)	Krešić (yellow card) 14'; Stanić (yellow card) 31'; Drmić 64' (pen.); Bušnja 77'	Report	A. Jakoliš (yellow card) 5'; Delić 47'; Batarelo (yellow card) 63'; Rak (yellow card) 76'; Grdić (yellow card) 88'; M. Jakoliš (yellow card) 90+2'	Stadium: Rujevica; Attendance: 2,281; Referee: Goran Pečarić

28 August 2021 7	Šibenik	3–1	Istra 1961	Šibenik
21:00 CEST (UTC+2)	Delić 17'; M. Jakoliš 22', 32', (yellow card) 76'; Mina (yellow card) 64'; Marin (yellow card) 74'; Bedoya (yellow card) 90+2'	Report	Perera (yellow card) 32'; Silva (yellow card) 56'; Navarro (yellow card) 61'; Beljo 74'; Bandé (yellow card) 76'; Mahmoud (yellow card) 76'; Daničić (yellow card) 90+4'	Stadium: Stadion Šubićevac; Attendance: 501; Referee: Ante Čuljak

11 September 2021 8	Dinamo Zagreb	2–0	Šibenik	Zagreb
17:00 CEST (UTC+2)	Dilaver (yellow card) 36'; Lauritsen 68'; Ivanušec 78'	Report	Bačelić-Grgić (yellow card) 90'	Stadium: Stadion Maksimir; Attendance: 1,350; Referee: Tihomir Pejin

25 September 2021 10	Šibenik	0–2	Osijek	Šibenik
19:05 CEST (UTC+2)	A. Jakoliš (yellow card) 90+3'	Report	Fiolić 18'; Topčagić (yellow card) 29'; Bartolec (yellow card) 59'; Žaper 82'; Nejašmić (yellow card) 87'	Stadium: Stadion Šubićevac; Attendance: 746; Referee: Ante Čuljak

1 October 2021 11	Šibenik	1–2	Gorica	Šibenik
18:00 CEST (UTC+2)	Ćurić 66'	Report	Fruk 15', 41'; Jovičić (yellow card) 38'; Kalik (yellow card) 49'; Stojanovski (yellow card) 78'; Janković (yellow card) 84'	Stadium: Stadion Šubićevac; Attendance: 466; Referee: Tihomir Pejin

17 October 2021 12	Šibenik	2–0	Hajduk Split	Šibenik
17:30 CEST (UTC+2)	Mina 25'; Bačelić-Grgić (yellow card) 40'; Ćurić (yellow card) 74' (goal) 84' (pen.); Batarelo (yellow card) 90+4'	Report		Stadium: Stadion Šubićevac; Attendance: 1,668; Referee: Zdenko Lovrić

7 November 2021 15	Šibenik	0–1	Rijeka	Šibenik
17:30 CET (UTC+1)	Cvetković (yellow card) 27'	Report	Smolčić 45+1' (yellow card) 90+2'; Krešić (yellow card) 74'; Pavičić (yellow card) 89'	Stadium: Šubićevac; Attendance: 557; Referee: Ante Čuljak

20 November 2021 16	Istra 1961	3–4	Šibenik	Pula
17:05 CET (UTC+1)	L. Marin 44'; Hujber (yellow card) 45'; Desio (yellow card) 65'; Bandé (yellow card) 66'; Mlinar (yellow card) 77'; Beljo 82'; Mišković 88'; Galilea (yellow card) 90+4'; Collao (yellow card) 90+5'	Report	M. Jakoliš 39', 90+5'; Delić 61', 72'; Bilić (yellow card) 90+4'	Stadium: Stadion Aldo Drosina; Attendance: 372; Referee: Goran Pečarić

28 November 2021 17	Šibenik	1–2	Dinamo Zagreb	Šibenik
15:00 CET (UTC+1)	Perić (yellow card) 14'; Marin (yellow card) 44'; Jakoliš 75'; Batarelo (yellow card) 76'	Report	Ivanušec 19'; Andrić (yellow card) 50'; Perić 80' (o.g.)	Stadium: Stadion Šubićevac; Attendance: 831; Referee: Mario Zebec

12 December 2021 19	Osijek	3–1	Šibenik	Osijek
13:00 CET (UTC+1)	Miérez 3'; Bohar 6'; Lončar (yellow card) 13'; Kleinheisler 33'; Hiroš (yellow card) 55'	Report	Marin 7'; Mina (yellow card) 53'; Ćurić (yellow card) 90+1'	Stadium: Gradski Vrt Stadium; Attendance: 1,027; Referee: Ivana Martinčić

18 December 2021 20	Gorica	2–3	Šibenik	Velika Gorica
13:00 CET (UTC+1)	Lovrić 12'; Brodić (yellow card) 58'; Stojanovski 68'	Report	A. Jakoliš 30'; Kvesić (yellow card) 47'; Delić 51'; Dasilva (yellow card) 80'; Cvetković (yellow card) 81'; M. Jakoliš 87'; Batarelo (yellow card) 89'	Stadium: Stadion Radnik; Attendance: 387; Referee: Duje Strukan

29 January 2022 21	Šibenik	1–3	Hajduk Split	Šibenik
17:05 CET (UTC+1)	Rak (yellow card) 7'; Ćurić 24'; Skorup (yellow card) 65'	Report	Livaja 15' (pen.), 45' (pen.); Fossati (yellow card) 29'; Vuković (yellow card) 51'; Krovinović 68'	Stadium: Stadion Šubićevac; Attendance: 1,156; Referee: Mario Zebec

20 February 2022 24	Rijeka	4–2	Šibenik	Rijeka
15:00 CET (UTC+1)	Selahi 16'; Vučkić 34', 66'; Murić 62'; Bušnja (yellow card) 90+1'	Report	Bačelić-Grgić (yellow card) 22'; Ćurić 70'; Attys 84'; Skorup (yellow card) 90'	Stadium: Rujevica; Attendance: 3,084; Referee: Zdenko Lovrić

27 February 2022 25	Šibenik	2–1	Istra 1961	Šibenik
15:00 CET (UTC+1)	Marin 53'; Rak (yellow card) 53'; Delić 64'	Report	Beljo 45+2'; Perera (yellow card) 57'	Stadium: Stadion Šubićevac; Attendance: 776; Referee: Ivana Martinčić

5 March 2022 26	Dinamo Zagreb	3–0	Šibenik	Zagreb
15:00 CET (UTC+1)	Bočkaj 16'; Petković 58'; Baturina 76'	Report	Skorup (yellow card) 12'; Bilić (yellow card) 75'	Stadium: Stadion Maksimir; Attendance: 2,421; Referee: Zdenko Lovrić

20 March 2022 28	Šibenik	0–3	Osijek	Šibenik
17:05 CET (UTC+1)	Mina (yellow card) 17'; Asanović (yellow card) 59'	Report	Lovrić 54', (yellow card) 75'; Leovac (yellow card) 64'; Marin 70' (o.g.); Topčagić 78'	Stadium: Šubićevac; Attendance: 667; Referee: Duje Strukan

2 April 2022 29	Šibenik	0–1	Gorica	Šibenik
17:00 CEST (UTC+2)	Vidović (yellow card) 62'	Report	Babec (yellow card) 13'; Stojanovski 40'	Stadium: Stadion Šubićevac; Attendance: 487; Referee: Dario Bel

9 April 2022 30	Hajduk Split	2–1	Šibenik	Split
19:05 CEST (UTC+2)	Krovinović 32'; Biuk (yellow card) 45'; Mlakar (yellow card) 67'; Elez 87'; Fossati (yellow card) 90+3'	Report	Bilić (yellow card) 33'; Rogić (yellow card) 33'; Šimunović (yellow card) 48'; Ćurić 54'; Skorup (yellow card) 90+3'	Stadium: Stadion Poljud; Attendance: 8,645; Referee: Ante Čuljak

30 April 2022 33	Šibenik	3–5	Rijeka	Šibenik
19:05 CEST (UTC+2)	Mesa 27'; Grezda 36'; Marin (yellow card) 58'; Bilić 80'	Report	Drmić 12', 69', 72'; Selahi (yellow card) 31'; Pavičić 37'; Krešić 49'	Stadium: Stadion Šubićevac; Attendance: 778; Referee: Ante Čuljak

7 May 2022 34	Istra 1961	1–2	Šibenik	Pula
19:05 CEST (UTC+2)	Perera (yellow card) 31'; Rovis (yellow card) 44'; Cáseres 73'; Mišković (yellow card) 77'	Report	Šimunović (yellow card) 7'; Delić 26'; Ćurić 45+1' (pen.); Vidović (yellow card) 59'; Marin (yellow card) 76'; Asanović (yellow card) 81'	Stadium: Stadion Aldo Drosina; Attendance: 684; Referee: Ante Čulina

15 May 2022 35	Šibenik	0–2	Dinamo Zagreb	Šibenik
19:05 CEST (UTC+2)	Attys (yellow card) 28'; Rogić (yellow card) 61'; Skorup (yellow card) 61'; Grezda (yellow card) 83'; Bilić (yellow card) 83'	Report	Tolić 39'; Bočkaj 53'; Ristovski (yellow card) 83'	Stadium: Stadion Šubićevac; Attendance: 3,522; Referee: Mario Zebec
