= 2022–23 HNK Šibenik season =

HNK Šibenik
2022–23 season
- Manager: Mario Cvitanović (until 31 January); Damir Canadi (from 31 January)
- Stadium: Stadion Šubićevac
- Croatian Football League: 10th (relegated)
- Croatian Football Cup: Runners-up
- Top goalscorer: League: Ivan Dolček (5); All: Ivan Dolček (6)

The 2022–23 HNK Šibenik season was the club's 91st season in existence and its third consecutive season in the top flight of Croatian football. In addition to the domestic league, HNK Šibenik participated in this season's edition of the Croatian Football Cup. The season covered the period from 1 July 2022 to 30 June 2023.

== Transfers ==
=== In ===
Pos.	Player	Transferred from	Fee	Date	Source
DF	(Slovenia) Matija Rom	(Ukraine) Kolos Kovalivka	Free	11 July 2022	
DF	(Croatia) Martin Pajić	(Cyprus) Pafos	Free	22 July 2022	
DF	(Croatia) Luka Šimunović	(Belarus) Shakhtyor Soligorsk	Loan return	31 December 2022	
MF	(Croatia) Josip Knežević	Unattached	Free	18 January 2023	
MF	(Bosnia and Herzegovina) Amer Hiroš	(Croatia) Osijek	Loan	25 January 2023	
MF	(Croatia) Dario Čanađija	(Norway) Aalesund	Free	27 January 2023	

=== Out ===
Pos.	Player	Transferred to	Fee	Date	Source
DF	(Croatia) Karlo Bilić	Released		1 July	
DF	(Croatia) Luka Šimunović	(Belarus) Shakhtyor Soligorsk	Loan	18 July 2022	
MF	(Croatia) Mario Ćurić	(Russia) Torpedo Moscow	€400,000	8 September 2022	
FW	(Croatia) Ivan Delić	(Italy) Cosenza	Loan	31 January 2023	
MF	(Croatia) Niko Rak	(Turkey) Konyaspor	€200,000	4 March 2023	

== Pre-season and friendlies ==
Win Draw Loss

30 June 2022 Friendly	Olimpija Ljubljana (Slovenia)	0–0	(Croatia) Šibenik
17:00 CET (UTC+1)

2 July 2022 Friendly	Maritsa Plovdiv (Bulgaria)	0–3	(Croatia) Šibenik
17:00 CET (UTC+1)

8 July 2022 Friendly	Šibenik (Croatia)	2–2	(Bosnia and Herzegovina) HŠK Posušje
18:00 CET (UTC+1)

12 July 2022 Friendly	Šibenik (Croatia)	5–0	(Croatia) Zagora Unešić
19:00 CET (UTC+1)

5 January 2023 Friendly	Šibenik (Croatia)	0–0	(Slovakia) Dolný Kubín
11:00 CET (UTC+1)

8 January 2023 Friendly	Šibenik (Croatia)	4–0	(Serbia) Radnički Beograd
11:00 CET (UTC+1)

11 January 2023 Friendly	Šibenik (Croatia)	0–2	(Croatia) Lokomotiva Zagreb
14:30 CET (UTC+1)

15 January 2023 Friendly	Šibenik (Croatia)	3–0	(North Macedonia) Makedonija GP
11:00 CET (UTC+1)

25 March 2023 Friendly	Šibenik (Croatia)	1–1	(Bosnia and Herzegovina) Zrinjski Mostar
13:00 CET (UTC+1)

== Competitions ==
=== Overview ===
Competition	First match	Last match	Starting round	Final position	Record							
Competition	First match	Last match	Starting round	Final position	Pld	W	D	L	GF	GA	GD	Win %
Croatian Football League	16 July 2022	28 May 2023	Matchday 1	10th	36	5	12	19	24	56	−32	13.89
Croatian Football Cup	18 October 2022	24 May 2023	Round of 32	Runners-up	5	4	0	1	8	4	+4	80.00
Total					41	9	12	20	32	60	−28	21.95

Source: Soccerway

=== Croatian Football League ===
==== League table ====
Pos	Team	Pld	W	D	L	GF	GA	GD	Pts	Qualification or relegation
6	Varaždin	36	12	10	14	41	51	−10	46	
7	Lokomotiva	36	11	10	15	45	50	−5	43	
8	Slaven Belupo	36	10	13	13	27	46	−19	43	
9	Gorica	36	7	11	18	36	50	−14	32	
10	Šibenik (R)	36	5	12	19	24	56	−32	27	Relegation to First Football League

Source: SuperSport HNL
Rules for classification: 1) Points; 2) Head-to-head points; 3) Head-to-head goal difference; 4) Head-to-head goals scored (at home if two teams tied); 5) Goal difference; 6) Goals scored; 7) Play-off
(Note: Criteria 2-4 and 7 is only used if deciding champion, teams to international competition or teams for relegation and in that case criteria 6 will not be used).
(R) Relegated

==== Results summary ====
Overall								Home						Away					
Pld	W	D	L	GF	GA	GD	Pts	W	D	L	GF	GA	GD	W	D	L	GF	GA	GD
36	5	12	19	24	56	−32	27	3	4	11	15	33	−18	2	8	8	9	23	−14

==== Results by round ====
Round	1	2	3	4	5	6	7	8	9	10	11	12	13	14	15	16	17	18	19	20	21	22	23	24	25	26	27	28	29	30	31	32	33	34	35	36
Ground	H	A	H	A	H	A	H	A	H	A	H	A	H	A	H	A	H	A	H	A	H	A	H	A	H	A	H	A	H	A	H	A	H	A	H	A
Result	L	D	W	D	D	D	L	D	D	D	D	D	L	D	L	L	L	L	L	W	L	W	D	L	W	D	L	L	L	L	W	L	L	L	L	L
Position																																				

A = Away; H = Home; W = Win; D = Draw; L = Loss

==== Matches ====
16 July 2022 1	Šibenik	0–1	Rijeka	Šibenik
21:00			Obregón 74'	Stadium: Stadion Šubićevac; Referee: Duje Strukan

23 July 2022 2	Gorica	0–0	Šibenik	Velika Gorica
18:55				Stadium: Stadion Radnik; Referee: Ante Čulina

29 July 2022 3	Šibenik	2–1	Lokomotiva Zagreb	Šibenik
18:55	Čop 38'; Matić 74'		Kulenović 83' (pen.)	Stadium: Stadion Šubićevac; Referee: Ivan Bebek

6 August 2022 4	Slaven Belupo	0–0	Šibenik	Koprivnica
18:55				Stadium: Gradski stadion Referee: Ante Čulina

12 August 2022 5	Šibenik	0–0	Istra 1961	Šibenik
20:00				Stadium: Stadion Šubićevac; Referee: Ante Čuljak

20 August 2022 6	Varaždin	2–2	Šibenik	Varaždin
18:30	Šego 29', 50'		Čop 24'; Delić 69' (pen.)	Stadium: Stadion Varteks; Referee: Fran Jović

28 August 2022 7	Šibenik	1–2	Dinamo Zagreb	Šibenik
				Stadium: Stadion Šubićevac

3 September 2022 8	Osijek	1–1	Šibenik	Osijek
				Stadium: Opus Arena

9 September 2022 9	Šibenik	1–1	Hajduk Split	Šibenik
				Stadium: Stadion Šubićevac

18 September 2022 10	Rijeka	0–0	Šibenik	Rijeka
				Stadium: Stadion Rujevica

2 October 2022 11	Šibenik	1–1	Gorica	Šibenik
				Stadium: Stadion Šubićevac

7 October 2022 12	Lokomotiva Zagreb	1–1	Šibenik	Zagreb
				Stadium: Stadion Kranjčevićeva

14 October 2022 13	Šibenik	0–2	Slaven Belupo	Šibenik
				Stadium: Stadion Šubićevac

23 October 2022 14	Istra 1961	0–0	Šibenik	Pula
				Stadium: Stadion Aldo Drosina

28 October 2022 15	Šibenik	1–2	Varaždin	Šibenik
				Stadium: Stadion Šubićevac

6 November 2022 16	Dinamo Zagreb	3–0	Šibenik	Zagreb
				Stadium: Stadion Maksimir

13 November 2022 17	Šibenik	0–2	Osijek	Šibenik
				Stadium: Stadion Šubićevac

22 January 2023 18	Hajduk Split	2–1	Šibenik	Split
				Stadium: Stadion Poljud

28 January 2023 19	Šibenik	1–2	Rijeka	Šibenik
				Stadium: Stadion Šubićevac

5 February 2023 20	Gorica	0–3	Šibenik	Velika Gorica
				Stadium: Stadion Radnik

12 February 2023 21	Šibenik	0–4	Lokomotiva Zagreb	Šibenik
				Stadium: Stadion Šubićevac

17 February 2023 22	Slaven Belupo	0–1	Šibenik	Koprivnica
				Stadium: Gradski stadion

24 February 2023 23	Šibenik	0–0	Istra 1961	Šibenik
				Stadium: Stadion Šubićevac

4 March 2023 24	Varaždin	2–0	Šibenik	Varaždin
16:00	Brodić 45+1'; Teklić 54'			Stadium: Stadion Varteks; Referee: Goran Pečarić

11 March 2023 25	Šibenik	2–1	Dinamo Zagreb	Šibenik
				Stadium: Stadion Šubićevac

18 March 2023 26	Osijek	0–0	Šibenik	Osijek
				Stadium: Opus Arena

1 April 2023 27	Šibenik	2–3	Hajduk Split	Šibenik
				Stadium: Stadion Šubićevac

8 April 2023 28	Rijeka	1–0	Šibenik	Rijeka
				Stadium: Stadion Rujevica

14 April 2023 29	Šibenik	0–4	Gorica	Šibenik
				Stadium: Stadion Šubićevac

21 April 2023 30	Lokomotiva Zagreb	1–0	Šibenik	Zagreb
				Stadium: Stadion Kranjčevićeva

25 April 2023 31	Šibenik	3–1	Slaven Belupo	Šibenik
				Stadium: Stadion Šubićevac

29 April 2023 32	Istra 1961	3–0	Šibenik	Pula
				Stadium: Stadion Aldo Drosina

5 May 2023 33	Šibenik	0–2	Varaždin	Šibenik
				Stadium: Stadion Šubićevac

14 May 2023 34	Dinamo Zagreb	4–0	Šibenik	Zagreb
				Stadium: Stadion Maksimir

19 May 2023 35	Šibenik	1–4	Osijek	Šibenik
				Stadium: Stadion Šubićevac

28 May 2023 36	Hajduk Split	3–0	Šibenik	Split
				Stadium: Stadion Poljud

=== Croatian Football Cup ===
18 October 2022 Round of 32	Jadran Poreč	1–2	Šibenik
15:00	Lepinjica 11'; Šverko (red card) 84'		Marasović 24'; Delić 72'

9 November 2022 Round of 16	Šibenik	2–0	Gorica	Šibenik
18:00	Dolček 48'; Čop 54' (pen.)			Stadium: Stadion Šubićevac

1 March 2023 Quarter-finals	BSK Bijelo Brdo	0–2	Šibenik	Bijelo Brdo
12:30		Report	Knežević 21'; Arai 88'	Stadium: Stadion BSK; Referee: Ante Čulina

5 April 2023 Semi-finals	Šibenik	2–1	Dinamo Zagreb	Šibenik
17:30	Pozo 72'; Čop 90+3'	Report	Drmić 1'	Stadium: Stadion Šubićevac; Referee: Dario Bel

24 May 2023 Final	Hajduk Split	2–0	Šibenik	Rijeka
19:00	Melnjak 62'; Livaja 90+5' (pen.)	Report		Stadium: Stadion Rujevica; Referee: Igor Pajač
