= Dino Skorup =

Croatian footballer

Personal information
- Date of birth: 4 October 1999 (age 27)
- Place of birth: Split, Croatia
- Height: 1.87 m (6 ft 1 1/2 in)
- Position: Central midfielder

Team information
- Current team: Torpedo Kutaisi
- Number: 20

Youth career
- 2006–2008: Dalmatinac Split
- 2008–2018: Hajduk Split

Senior career*
Years	Team	Apps	(Gls)
2017–2021	Hajduk Split II	30	(3)
2020	→ Varaždin (loan)	8	(0)
2021–2022	Hajduk Split	1	(0)
2021	→ Hrvatski Dragovoljac (loan)	3	(0)
2022	→ Šibenik (loan)	14	(0)
2022–2023	Šibenik	15	(0)
2023–2024	GOŠK Gabela	30	(7)
2024–2025	Borac Banja Luka	12	(1)
2025–2026	Sepsi OSK	17	(0)
2026	→ Borac Banja Luka (loan)	15	(1)
2026–	Torpedo Kutaisi	6	(0)

International career
2013	Croatia U14	1	(0)
2017	Croatia U19	4	(0)
- * Club domestic league appearances and goals as of 14 September 2026

Dino Skorup (born 4 October 1999) is a Croatian professional footballer who plays as a midfielder for Erovnuli Liga club Torpedo Kutaisi.

== Club career ==
Born in Split, Skorup graduated from the youth academy of Hajduk Split and was promoted to the reserves ahead of the 2018–19 season. In October 2018, however, he received an injury that would sideline him until the end of the season The following season, he was a regular in the reserve squad, playing occasionally in friendly games with the first team.

In the summer of 2020, Skorup was sent on loan to the top-tier NK Varaždin, along with teammate Ivan Delić. Skorup made his Prva HNL debut in a 1–5 home loss against HNK Gorica, coming in the 87th minute for Marko Stolnik.

== International career ==
As of December 2020, Skorup was capped in 5 matches overall for Croatia's U14 and U19 teams.

== Honours ==
Šibenik

- Croatian Cup runner-up: 2022–23
