= Iker Pozo =

Spanish footballer

Personal information
- Full name: Iker Pozo La Rosa
- Date of birth: 6 August 2000 (age 26)
- Place of birth: Fuengirola, Spain
- Height: 1.73 m (5 ft 8 in)
- Position: Midfielder

Team information
- Current team: Rodina Moscow
- Number: 8

Youth career
- 2007–2012: Real Madrid
- 2012–2020: Manchester City

Senior career*
Years	Team	Apps	(Gls)
2020–2023	Manchester City	0	(0)
2020–2021	→ FC Eindhoven (loan)	28	(3)
2022	→ Rijeka (loan)	0	(0)
2023–2025	Šibenik	57	(2)
2025–2026	Gorica	32	(4)
2026–	Rodina Moscow	12	(2)
- * Club domestic league appearances and goals as of 22 November 2026

Iker Pozo La Rosa (born 6 August 2000) is a Spanish footballer who plays as a midfielder for the Russian Premier League club Rodina Moscow.

== Career ==
=== Early career ===
Pozo's earliest football career was influenced by his older brother José Ángel's, as, when Real Madrid brought the older Pozo from UD Fuengirola Los Boliches, the entire family moved to Madrid, and Iker joined the Real Madrid academy. Five years later, when José Ángel was snapped up by Manchester City, the younger Pozo, aged 11, followed him to the Manchester City academy.

In the 2017/18 season he featured in the U19 team's UEFA Youth League run up to the semi-finals, featuring in 6 matches and gathering 2 assists. He was also moved to the U23 team, where he would feature for in the subsequent two seasons as well.

=== FC Eindhoven ===
Pozo joined the Dutch second-tier side FC Eindhoven for a season-long loan in the summer of 2020. He quickly established himself as a starter at the club, playing mostly in a more forward central midfield role than the defensive one he played at City, resulting in his first three senior goals.

=== Loans to Croatian clubs ===
In February 2022, Pozo was loaned to HNK Rijeka. In the first week, before the official paperwork arrived, he impressed the staff at the club. On his first training session after the loan was officially finalized, however, he injured his knee. After the magnetic resonance showed the injury was serious, his loan was canceled and he returned to Manchester, not having played a single official game for the club.

In February 2023, Pozo joined HNK Šibenik.

=== Rodina Moscow ===
On 16 July 2026, Pozo signed a three-year contract with the Russian Premier League newcomers Rodina Moscow. On 31 July 2026, Pozo scored the first ever Rodina's goal in the Russian Premier League.

== Career statistics ==
As of 22 November 2026

Club	Season	League			Cup		Total	
Club	Season	Division	Apps	Goals	Apps	Goals	Apps	Goals
FC Eindhoven (loan)	2020–21	Eerste Divisie	28	3	1	0	29	3
Rijeka (loan)	2021–22	Croatian Football League	0	0	0	0	0	0
Šibenik	2022–23	Croatian Football League	7	0	3	1	10	1
Šibenik	2023–24	First Football League	31	2	1	0	32	2
Šibenik	2024–25	Croatian Football League	19	0	0	0	19	0
Šibenik	Total		57	2	4	1	61	3
Gorica	2025–26	Croatian Football League	32	4	3	1	35	5
Rodina Moscow	2026–27	Russian Premier League	12	2	4	0	16	2
Career total			129	11	12	2	141	13
