= Josip Kvesić =

Bosnian footballer (born 1990)

Personal information
- Date of birth: 21 September 1990 (age 36)
- Place of birth: Široki Brijeg, SFR Yugoslavia
- Height: 1.79 m (5 ft 10 in)
- Position: Left-back

Team information
- Current team: Sloga Doboj
- Number: 33

Youth career
- –2007: Široki Brijeg
- 2007–2008: Žilina

Senior career*
Years	Team	Apps	(Gls)
2008–2010	Žilina	7	(0)
2010–2011	Varaždin	34	(0)
2011–2015	Željezničar	68	(1)
2015–2016	Antalyaspor	6	(0)
2016	→ Karşıyaka (loan)	6	(0)
2016–2017	Hajduk Split	9	(0)
2017	Anorthosis Famagusta	0	(0)
2018–2020	Široki Brijeg	37	(3)
2020–2023	Šibenik	74	(0)
2023–	Sloga Doboj	68	(2)

International career
2008	Bosnia and Herzegovina U19	12	(0)
2011–2012	Bosnia and Herzegovina U21	10	(0)
- * Club domestic league appearances and goals as of 26 May 2026

Josip Kvesić (born 21 September 1990) is a Bosnian Croat professional footballer who plays as a left-back for Bosnian Premier League club Sloga Doboj.

== Career statistics ==
As of match played 26 May 2026

Appearances and goals by club, season and competition
Club	Season	League			National cup (Note: Includes Bosnian Cup, Turkish Cup, Croatian Cup)		Continental		Total	
Club	Season	Division	Apps	Goals	Apps	Goals	Apps	Goals	Apps	Goals
Žilina	2008–09	Slovak First League	5	0	—		—		5	0
Žilina	2009–10	Slovak First League	2	0	—		—		2	0
Žilina	Total		7	0	—		—		7	0
Varaždin	2009–10	Croatian Football League	12	0	—		—		12	0
Varaždin	2010–11	Croatian Football League	22	0	—		—		22	0
Varaždin	Total		34	0	—		—		34	0
Željezničar	2011–12	Bosnian Premier League	24	1	2	0	2 (Note: Appearances in UEFA Europa League)	0	28	1
Željezničar	2012–13	Bosnian Premier League	15	0	5	0	2 (Note: Appearances in the UEFA Champions League)	1	22	1
Željezničar	2013–14	Bosnian Premier League	3	0	—		—		3	0
Željezničar	2014–15	Bosnian Premier League	26	0	2	0	4	0	32	0
Željezničar	2015–16	Bosnian Premier League	0	0	—		4	0	4	0
Željezničar	Total		68	1	9	0	12	1	89	2
Antalyaspor	2015–16	Süper Lig	6	0	2	0	—		8	0
Karşıyaka (loan)	2015–16	TFF First League	6	0	1	0	—		7	0
Hajduk Split	2016–17	Croatian Football League	9	0	1	0	—		10	0
Široki Brijeg	2017–18	Bosnian Premier League	9	1	—		—		9	1
Široki Brijeg	2018–19	Bosnian Premier League	13	1	2	1	2	0	17	2
Široki Brijeg	2019–20	Bosnian Premier League	15	1	1	0	2	0	18	1
Široki Brijeg	Total		37	3	3	1	4	0	44	4
Šibenik	2020–21	Croatian Football League	33	0	2	0	—		35	0
Šibenik	2021–22	Croatian Football League	27	0	1	0	—		28	0
Šibenik	2022–23	Croatian Football League	14	0	1	0	—		15	0
Šibenik	Total		74	0	4	0	—		78	0
Sloga Doboj	2023–24	Bosnian Premier League	25	2	6	0	—		31	2
Sloga Doboj	2024–25	Bosnian Premier League	28	0	2	0	—		30	0
Sloga Doboj	2025–26	Bosnian Premier League	15	0	4	1	—		19	1
Sloga Doboj	Total		68	2	12	1	—		80	3
Career total			309	6	32	2	16	1	357	9

== Honours ==
Željezničar

- Bosnian Premier League: 2011–12, 2012–13
- Bosnian Cup: 2011–12

Individual

- Bosnian Premier League Young Player of the Season: 2011–12
