= Cole Dasilva =

English footballer (born 1999)

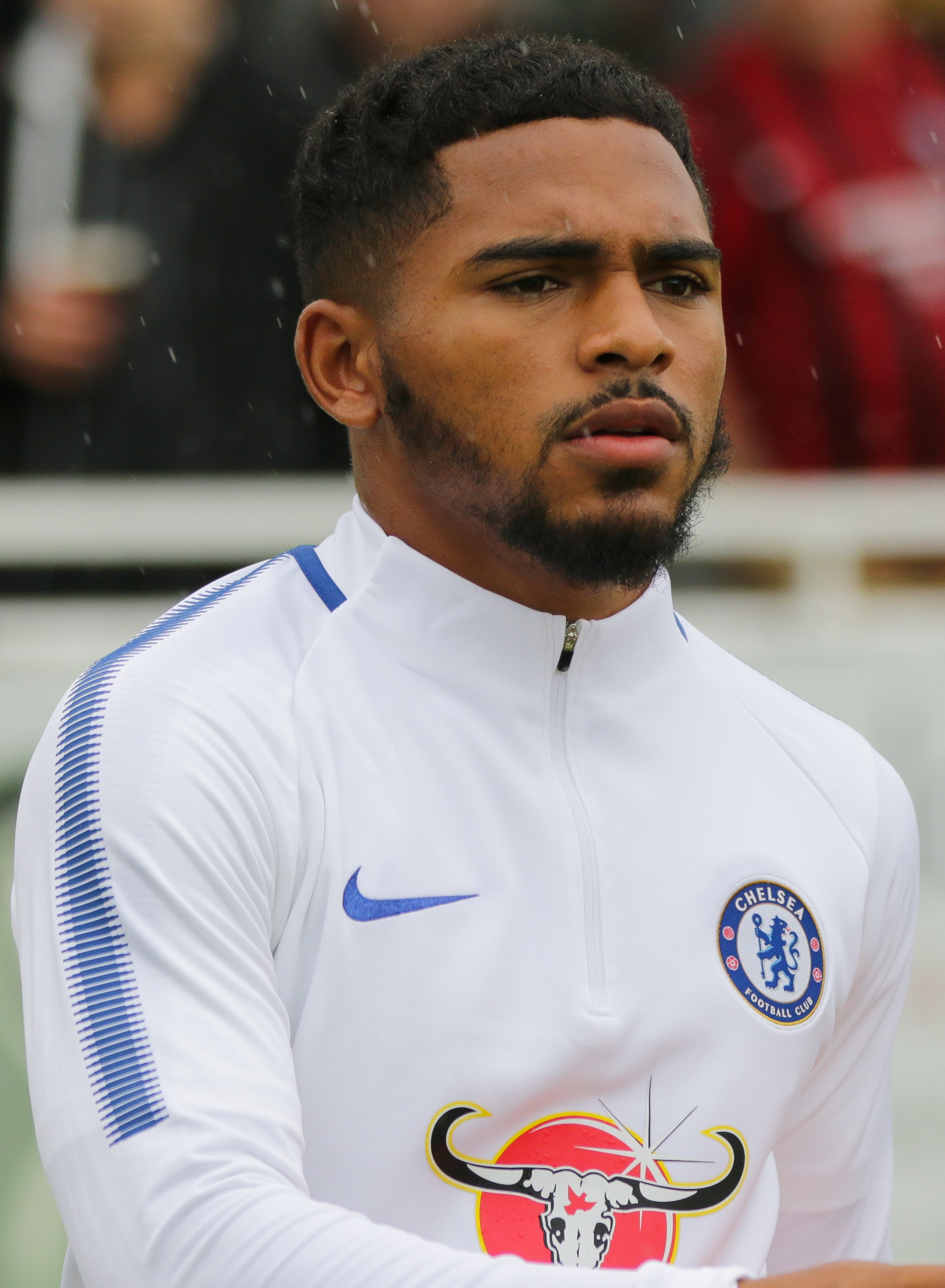
- Dasilva warming up for Chelsea DS in 2017.

Personal information
- Full name: Cole Perry Dasilva
- Date of birth: 11 May 1999 (age 27)
- Place of birth: Luton, England
- Height: 1.70 m (5 ft 7 in)
- Position: Full back

Team information
- Current team: Cheshunt

Youth career
- Luton Celtic
- –2012: Luton Town
- 2012–2018: Chelsea
- 2018–2020: Brentford

Senior career*
Years	Team	Apps	(Gls)
2021–2022	HNK Šibenik	4	(0)
2022	Oxford City	6	(0)
2022	Hemel Hempstead Town	6	(0)
2022–2023	Royston Town	35	(1)
2023–2024	Biggleswade Town	18	(1)
2024	Bedford Town	6	(0)
2024–2026	Bishop's Stortford	80	(14)
2026–	Cheshunt	1	(0)

International career
–2014	Wales U15		
2014	Wales U16		
2014	England U16	1	(0)
2015–2016	Wales U17	6	(0)
2016	Wales U19	3	(0)
2017	Wales U20	1	(0)
2017–2019	Wales U21	3	(0)
- * Club domestic league appearances and goals as of 17:48, 8 August 2026 (UTC)

Cole Perry Dasilva (born 11 May 1999) is a professional footballer who plays as a full back for Isthmian League Premier Division club Cheshunt.

Dasilva is a product of the Chelsea and Luton Town academies and began his professional career with Brentford in 2018. Following his release in 2020 and spell with Leicester City U23, Dasilva transferred to Croatian club HNK Šibenik in 2021. He returned to England in 2022 and entered non-League football. Born in England, Dasilva was capped by England and Wales at youth international level.

== Club career ==
=== Chelsea ===
Initially a left winger, Dasilva began his career at hometown club Luton Celtic, playing alongside his brothers Rio and Jay under his father's management. The brothers later entered the youth system at Luton Town and were a part of the U11 team which beat a Bayern Munich youth team in the 2009 Final of the five-a-side Aarau Masters. The brothers transferred to the Chelsea academy for a combined £1 million fee in January 2012. Dasilva began a scholarship in 2015 and progressed to sign a professional contract in June 2016, signing a one-year extension a year later. He had a successful youth career with the club, developing into a full back and winning the 2015–16 U18 Premier League and the 2015–16 FA Youth Cup. He also made three appearances in Chelsea's 2017–18 UEFA Youth League-winning campaign and made two EFL Trophy appearances for the U23 team. Dasilva was released at the end of the 2017–18 season.

=== Brentford ===
On 7 August 2018, Dasilva joined the B team at Championship club Brentford on a two-year contract for an undisclosed fee, with the option of a further year. He made 41 appearances and scored seven goals during the 2018–19 season and was a part of the team which won the 2018–19 Middlesex Senior Cup. During the 2019–20 pre-season, Dasilva was included in the first team squad for its training camp in Austria, but was largely frozen out of the B team during the regular season and was released when his contract expired in June 2020.

=== HNK Šibenik ===
After playing the final three months of the 2020–21 season with Leicester City U23 as a free agent, Dasilva signed a contract with Croatian First League club HNK Šibenik on 27 June 2021. On 6 September, it was reported that Dasilva had finally been registered to play for the club and he made six appearances prior to the winter break, predominantly as a substitute. Dasilva failed to win a call into a matchday squad after the winter break and departed the club in March 2022.

=== Non-League football ===
==== 2022–2023 ====
On 8 March 2022, Dasilva signed an undisclosed-length contract with National League South club Oxford City. During what remained of the 2021–22 season, Dasilva made 8 appearances and was a part of the Oxfordshire Senior Cup-winning squad, but he did not feature in the Hoops' unsuccessful playoff campaign. Dasilva signed a contract with National League South club Hemel Hempstead Town in July 2022, but after making six appearances during the first seven weeks of the 2022–23 season, he was released to join Southern League Premier Division Central club Royston Town in September 2022. Dasilva finished a mid-table 2022–23 season with 39 appearances and one goal.

==== 2023–2026 ====
In August 2023, Dasilva dropped a division to transfer to Southern League First Division Central club Biggleswade Town. He made 25 appearances and scored two goals, prior to transferring across the division to Bedford Town on 5 March 2024. He made 6 appearances during the remainder of the 2023–24 season and was an unused substitute during the team's successful playoff campaign. In August 2024, Dasilva transferred to Southern League Premier Division Central club Bishop's Stortford. His performances in his 48 appearances during the 2024–25 season were recognised with the club's Supporters' and Players' Player of the Year awards. Dasilva was retained for the 2025–26 season and made 46 appearances, scoring a career-high 15 goals.

==== 2026–present ====
In July 2026, Dasilva transferred to Isthmian League Premier Division club Cheshunt.

== International career ==
Dasilva was capped by Wales at U15, U16, U17, U19, U20 and U21 level and England at U16 level. He was a part of Wales' 2014–15 Victory Shield-winning team, but was not included in the squad for the deciding match versus Northern Ireland. Dasilva made a single appearance during the U20 team's 2017 Toulon Tournament campaign.

== Personal life ==
Dasilva is one of three footballing brothers – he is twin to Rio and younger brother to Jay. He is of Welsh and Brazilian descent.

== Career statistics ==
As of match played 8 August 2026

Appearances and goals by club, season and competition
Club	Season	League			National cup (Note: Includes Croatian Cup, FA Cup)		Other		Total	
Club	Season	Division	Apps	Goals	Apps	Goals	Apps	Goals	Apps	Goals
Chelsea U21	2017–18	—					2 (Note: Appearances in EFL Trophy)	0	2	0
HNK Šibenik	2021–22	Croatian First League	4	0	2	0	—		6	0
Oxford City	2021–22	National League South	6	0	—		2 (Note: Appearances in Oxfordshire Senior Cup)	0	8	0
Hemel Hempstead Town	2022–23	National League South	6	0	—		—		6	0
Royston Town	2022–23	Southern League Premier Division Central	35	1	1	0	3 (Note: 2 appearances in FA Trophy, 1 appearance in Herts Senior Cup)	0	39	1
Biggleswade Town	2023–24	Southern League First Division Central	18	1	6	0	2 (Note: 1 appearance and 1 goal in FA Trophy, 1 appearance in Bedfordshire Senior Cup)	1	26	2
Bedford Town	2023–24	Southern League First Division Central	6	0	—		0	0	6	0
Bishop's Stortford	2024–25	Southern League Premier Division Central	41	4	4	1	3	0	48	5
Bishop's Stortford	2025–26	Southern League Premier Division Central	39	10	1	0	6 (Note: 3 appearances and 3 goals in FA Trophy, 3 appearances and 2 goals in Herts Senior Cup)	5	46	15
Bishop's Stortford	Total		80	14	5	1	9	5	94	20
Cheshunt	2026–27	Isthmian League Premier Division	1	0	0	0	0	0	1	0
Career total			156	16	14	1	18	6	188	23

== Honours ==
Brentford B

- Middlesex Senior Cup: 2018–19

Oxford City

- Oxfordshire Senior Cup: 2021–22

Bedford Town

- Southern League First Division Central play-offs: 2024

Wales U16

- Victory Shield: 2014–15

Individual

- Bishop's Stortford Supporters' Player of the Year: 2024–25
- Bishop's Stortford Players' Player of the Year: 2024–25
