= Christopher Attys =

Haitian footballer (born 2001)

Personal information
- Date of birth: 13 March 2001 (age 25)
- Place of birth: Saint-Maurice, France
- Height: 1.86 m (6 ft 1 in)
- Position: Midfielder

Team information
- Current team: Triestina
- Number: 8

Youth career
- –2018: Torcy
- 2018–2021: Inter Milan
- 2020–2021: → SPAL (loan)

Senior career*
| Years | Team | Apps | (Gls) |
| 2021–2022 | Inter Milan | 0 | (0) |
| 2021–2022 | → Šibenik (loan) | 20 | (1) |
| 2022–2023 | Imolese | 9 | (0) |
| 2023–2024 | Trento | 39 | (7) |
| 2024 | → Feralpisalò (loan) | 3 | (0) |
| 2024– | Triestina | 26 | (2) |
| 2025 | → Lecco (loan) | 9 | (0) |

International career^{‡}
| 2024– | Haiti | 16 | (3) |
- * Club domestic league appearances and goals as of 30 April 2026 ‡ National team caps and goals as of 13 November 2025

Christopher Attys (born 13 March 2001) is a professional footballer who plays as a midfielder for Serie D Group C club Triestina. Born in France, he plays for the Haiti national team.

== Club career ==
In 2018, Attys joined the youth academy of Serie A side Inter Milan from the youth academy of Torcy in the French sixth division. In 2020, he was sent on loan to Italian second division club SPAL. In 2021, he was sent on loan to Šibenik in Croatia. On 18 September 2021, Attys debuted for Šibenik in a 2–1 win over Lokomotiva.

On 6 January 2023, Attys moved to Serie C club Trento on a permanent deal.

On 1 February 2024, Attys joined Serie B club Feralpisalò on loan.

On 19 July 2024, he joined Serie C side Triestina on a three-year deal. On 30 January 2025, Attys was loaned by Lecco, with an option to buy.

== International career ==
Born in France, Attys is of Haitian descent. He was called up to the Haiti national team for a set of 2026 FIFA World Cup qualification matches in June 2024.

== Career statistics ==
=== Club ===
As of match played 23 August 2025

Appearances and goals by club, season and competition
| Club | Season | League | | | Cup | | Europe | | Other | | Total | |
| Club | Season | Division | Apps | Goals | Apps | Goals | Apps | Goals | Apps | Goals | Apps | Goals |
|---|---|---|---|---|---|---|---|---|---|---|---|---|
| Inter Milan | 2021–22 | Serie A | 0 | 0 | 0 | 0 | 0 | 0 | 0 | 0 | 0 | 0 |
| HNK Šibenik (loan) | 2021–22 | Croatian Football League | 20 | 1 | 2 | 0 | — | | — | | 22 | 1 |
| Imolese | 2022–23 | Serie C | 9 | 0 | — | | — | | 2 (Note: Appearances in Coppa Italia Serie C) | 0 | 11 | 0 |
| Trento | 2022–23 | Serie C | 17 | 3 | — | | — | | — | | 17 | 3 |
| Trento | 2023–24 | Serie C | 22 | 4 | — | | — | | 0 | 0 | 22 | 4 |
| Trento | Total | | 39 | 7 | — | | — | | 0 | 0 | 39 | 7 |
| Feralpisalò (loan) | 2023–24 | Serie B | 3 | 0 | — | | — | | — | | 3 | 0 |
| Triestina | 2024–25 | Serie C | 17 | 2 | — | | — | | — | | 17 | 2 |
| Triestina | 2025–26 | Serie C | 1 | 0 | — | | — | | 0 | 0 | 1 | 0 |
| Triestina | Total | | 18 | 2 | — | | — | | 0 | 0 | 18 | 2 |
| Lecco (loan) | 2024–25 | Serie C | 9 | 0 | — | | — | | — | | 9 | 0 |
| Career total | | | 98 | 10 | 2 | 0 | 0 | 0 | 2 | 0 | 102 | 10 |

=== International ===
As of match played 18 November 2025

Appearances and goals by national team and year
| National team | Year | Apps | Goals |
|---|---|---|---|
| Haiti | 2024 | 7 | 3 |
| Haiti | 2025 | 9 | 0 |
| Total | | 16 | 2 |

=== International goals ===
Scores and results list Haiti's goal tally first.

| No. | Date | Venue | Opponent | Score | Result | Competition |
|---|---|---|---|---|---|---|
| 1. | 9 September 2024 | Mayagüez Athletics Stadium, Mayagüez, Puerto Rico | Sint Maarten | 1–0 | 6–0 | 2024–25 CONCACAF Nations League B |
| 2. | 15 November 2024 | Mayagüez Athletics Stadium, Mayagüez, Puerto Rico | Sint Maarten | 1-0 | 8-0 | 2024–25 CONCACAF Nations League B |
| 3. | 19 November 2024 | Mayagüez Athletics Stadium, Mayagüez, Puerto Rico | Puerto Rico | 1-0 | 3-0 | 2024–25 CONCACAF Nations League B |

- Haiti plays their home games in other countries, due to amid gang violence.

== Career statistics ==
=== Club ===
As of 20 May 2022

| Club | Season | League | | | Cup | | Europe | | Other | | Total | |
| Club | Season | League | Apps | Goals | Apps | Goals | Apps | Goals | Apps | Goals | Apps | Goals |
|---|---|---|---|---|---|---|---|---|---|---|---|---|
| Šibenik (loan) | 2021–22 | Prva HNL | 20 | 1 | 2 | 0 | — | | — | | 22 | 1 |
| Career total | | | 20 | 1 | 2 | 0 | — | | — | | 22 | 1 |
