= 2018–19 Croatian Second Football League =

Druga HNL
- Season: 2018–19
- Champions: Varaždin
- Promoted: Varaždin
- Relegated: Zadar; Lučko
- Matches: 182
- Goals: 425 (2.34 per match)
- Top goalscorer: Leon Benko (21)
- Biggest home win: Šibenik 5–0 Zadar
- Biggest away win: Varaždin 1–4 Dinamo Zagreb II; Međimurje 1–4 Hajduk Split II
- Highest scoring: Sesvete 3–3 Zadar; Varaždin 4–2 Hajduk Split II; Hajduk Split II 3–3 BSK; Zadar 5–1 Solin
- Total attendance: 88,509
- Average attendance: 486
- All statistics correct as of 25 May 2019.

The 2018–19 Croatian Second Football League (also known as Druga HNL and 2. HNL) was the 28th season of the Croatian Second Football League, the second-level football competition for men's association football teams in Croatia, since its establishment in 1992. The season started on 24 August 2018 and ended in May 2019.

The league is contested by 14 teams and played in a double round robin format, with each team playing every other team twice over 26 rounds.

== Teams ==
On 23 April 2018, Croatian Football Federation announced that the first stage of licensing procedure for 2018–19 season was completed. For the 2018–19 Druga HNL, only six clubs outside of top level were issued a second level license: Dinamo Zagreb II, Gorica, Hajduk Split II, Lučko, Osijek II and Sesvete. In the second stage of licensing procedure clubs that were not licensed in the first round appealed the decision.

The following teams have mathematically secured their place in the 2018–19 Druga HNL.

=== Stadia and locations ===
Locations of teams in 2018–19 Druga HNL

Club	Coach	City / Town	Stadium	2017–18 result	Capacity
BSK	(Croatia) Denis Krstanović	Bijelo Brdo	Igralište BSK	2nd (in Treća HNL East)	
Dinamo Zagreb II	(Croatia) Igor Jovićević	Zagreb	Stadion Hitrec-Kacian	3rd	5,000
Dugopolje	(Croatia) Miroslav Bojko	Dugopolje	Stadion Hrvatski vitezovi	6th	5,200
Hajduk Split II	(Croatia) Mario Despotović	Split	Stadion Poljud	5th	35,000
Hrvatski Dragovoljac	(Croatia) Boris Perković	Zagreb	Stadion NŠC Stjepan Spajić	11th	5,000
Kustošija	(Croatia) Ante Ivanda	Zagreb	Stadion NK Kustošija	8th	2,550
Lučko	(Croatia) Dražen Biškup	Zagreb	Stadion Lučko	10th	1,500
Međimurje	(Croatia) Matija Kristić	Čakovec	Stadion SRC Mladost	3rd (in Treća HNL East)	6,500
Osijek II	(Croatia) Dino Skender	Osijek	Stadion Gradski vrt	1st (in Treća HNL East)	18,856
Sesvete	(Croatia) Dino Babić	Zagreb	Stadion sv. Josip Radnik	4th	1,200
Solin	(Croatia) Mladen Jurić	Solin	Stadion pokraj Jadra	9th	4,000
Šibenik	(Croatia) Borimir Perković	Šibenik	Stadion Šubićevac	7th	6,824
Zadar	(Croatia) Krešimir Sunara	Zadar	Stadion Stanovi	3rd (in Treća HNL South)	5,860
Varaždin	(Croatia) Branko Karačić	Varaždin	Stadion Varteks	2nd	8,850

=== Number of teams by county ===
Position	County	Number	Teams
1	City of Zagreb	5	Dinamo Zagreb II, Hrvatski Dragovoljac, Kustošija, Lučko and Sesvete
2	Split-Dalmatia	3	Dugopolje, Hajduk Split II and Solin
3	Osijek-Baranja	2	BSK and Osijek II
4	Međimurje	1	Međimurje
4	Šibenik-Knin	1	Šibenik
4	Varaždin	1	Varaždin
4	Zadar	1	Zadar

== League table ==
Pos	Team	Pld	W	D	L	GF	GA	GD	Pts	Qualification or relegation (Note: Dinamo Zagreb II, Hajduk Split II and Osijek II are ineligible for promotion)
1	Varaždin (C, P)	26	16	3	7	40	30	+10	51	Promotion to the Croatian First Football League
2	Šibenik	26	13	7	6	38	25	+13	46	Qualification to the promotion play-off
3	Osijek II	26	13	5	8	37	26	+11	44	Reserve teams are ineligible for promotion to the Croatian First Football League
4	Hajduk Split II	26	12	7	7	36	29	+7	43	Reserve teams are ineligible for promotion to the Croatian First Football League
5	Dugopolje	26	13	4	9	29	26	+3	43	
6	Sesvete	26	11	7	8	38	26	+12	40	
7	Dinamo Zagreb II	26	10	7	9	31	26	+5	37	Reserve teams are ineligible for promotion to the Croatian First Football League
8	Zadar (R)	26	9	7	10	36	40	−4	34	Relegation to the Croatian Third Football League
9	BSK Bijelo Brdo	26	6	10	10	31	37	−6	28	
10	Solin	26	5	13	8	24	31	−7	28	
11	Kustošija	26	7	7	12	20	28	−8	28	
12	Hrvatski Dragovoljac	26	7	6	13	23	29	−6	27	
13	Međimurje	26	6	7	13	26	42	−16	25	
14	Lučko (R)	26	6	6	14	16	31	−15	24	Relegation to the Croatian Third Football League

Source: Druga-HNL.com
Rules for classification: 1) Points; 2) Head-to-head points; 3) Head-to-head goal difference; 4) Head-to-head goals scored (at home if two teams tied); 5) Goal difference; 6) Goals scored; 7) Play-off
(Note: Criteria 2-4 and 7 is only used if deciding champion, teams for promotion or relegation and in that case criteria 6 will not be used).
(C) Champions; (P) Promoted; (R) Relegated

== Results ==
Home \ Away	BSK	DIN	DUG	HAJ	HRV	KUS	LUČ	MEĐ	OSI	SES	SOL	ŠIB	VAR	ZAD
BSK Bijelo Brdo	—	2–0	1–1	2–2	0–0	2–0	1–0	3–2	2–2	0–3	1–1	2–1	0–1	1–1
Dinamo Zagreb II	3–1	—	3–0	0–0	0–0	0–2	2–0	1–0	4–1	0–0	1–1	0–1	1–2	2–1
Dugopolje	2–0	1–0	—	0–1	2–1	1–0	2–0	4–0	1–0	1–1	0–0	1–0	1–2	1–0
Hajduk Split II	3–3	2–0	0–2	—	1–0	1–1	1–0	2–1	3–1	1–0	1–1	2–0	1–1	2–0
Hrvatski Dragovoljac	1–0	0–1	1–2	0–1	—	0–1	2–1	3–0	0–1	1–3	2–2	1–1	0–1	3–1
Kustošija	1–1	1–0	3–2	1–1	0–1	—	0–0	2–1	0–1	2–0	0–0	0–1	2–1	0–0
Lučko	2–3	1–0	1–1	0–2	0–0	2–1	—	0–0	1–0	1–0	2–0	0–1	1–0	2–2
Međimurje	1–0	1–1	1–2	1–4	3–1	1–1	1–0	—	2–1	1–1	1–0	0–0	0–2	4–1
Osijek II	1–1	3–0	4–0	3–1	3–1	2–0	0–0	2–1	—	1–0	0–0	1–0	3–0	2–0
Sesvete	1–0	1–2	1–0	4–1	3–1	3–0	3–1	3–1	3–1	—	3–0	0–0	1–1	3–3
Solin	2–2	1–1	1–0	1–0	0–0	1–0	3–0	1–0	0–1	1–1	—	1–1	1–2	2–2
Šibenik	3–2	2–2	0–1	2–1	2–1	2–1	3–0	2–2	2–2	1–0	3–2	—	2–0	5–0
Varaždin	2–1	1–4	1–0	4–2	0–2	2–1	1–0	4–0	2–0	3–0	2–1	3–1	—	2–2
Zadar	1–0	1–3	3–1	1–0	0–1	2–0	2–1	1–1	2–1	2–0	5–1	0–2	3–0	—

Source: Druga HNL (in Croatian)
Legend: Blue = home team win; Yellow = draw; Red = away team win.
For upcoming matches, an "a" indicates there is an article about the rivalry between the two participants.

== Top scorers ==
As of 25 May 2019

Rank	Player	Club(s)	Goals
1	(Croatia) Leon Benko	Varaždin	21
2	(Croatia) Marko Tolić	Sesvete	15
3	(Croatia) Josip Špoljarić	Osijek II	13
4	(Croatia) Antonio Repić	Zadar	12
5	(Croatia) Mario Munivrana	Međimurje	8
6	(Croatia) Ivan Delić	Hajduk Split II	7
6	(Croatia) Valentino Majstorović	Hrvatski Dragovoljac	7
6	(Ghana) Prince Ampem	Šibenik	7
6	(Croatia) Mario Vasilj	Sesvete	7

== See also ==
- 2018–19 Croatian Football Cup
- 2018–19 Croatian First Football League
