= Josip Vuković =

Croatian footballer

Personal information
- Date of birth: 2 May 1992 (age 34)
- Place of birth: Split, Croatia
- Height: 1.84 m (6 ft 0 in)
- Position: Defensive midfielder

Team information
- Current team: Dugopolje
- Number: 20

Youth career
- –2011: Hajduk Split

Senior career*
Years	Team	Apps	(Gls)
2011–2014	Dugopolje	29	(0)
2014–2015	Hajduk Split	20	(0)
2014–2015	→ Hajduk Split B	5	(1)
2015–2017	Istra 1961	21	(0)
2017	Split	10	(0)
2017	Vitez	9	(0)
2018	Olimpik Donetsk	8	(0)
2018–2020	Marítimo	46	(0)
2018	Marítimo B	3	(0)
2020–2021	Osijek	20	(0)
2021–2023	Hajduk Split	35	(3)
2023	→ Al Faisaly (loan)	18	(1)
2023–2024	Pendikspor	16	(0)
2024–2025	Kocaelispor	50	(3)
2025–2026	Sakaryaspor	26	(1)
2026–	Dugopolje	8	(4)

International career
2008	Croatia U17	1	(0)
2010–2011	Croatia U19	12	(0)
- * Club domestic league appearances and goals as of 8 November 2026

Josip Vuković (born 2 May 1992) is a Croatian footballer who plays as a midfielder for Prva NL club Dugopolje.

== Club career ==
Josip Vuković went through the ranks of HNK Hajduk Split, establishing himself, as well, as a regular for the Croatia U19 team in the 2010/2011 season. He was released, however, by Hajduk, in the summer of 2011, and he joined the Druga HNL side NK Dugopolje. Soon after, however, this was followed by injury, forcing Vuković to miss the following 1.5 seasons, returning only in the late stages of the 2012/2013 season. He was re-signed by Hajduk in the summer of 2014 and he made his Prva HNL debut on 24 August 2014, in a 0–2 loss against NK Osijek, after the coach Igor Tudor decided to rest several first-team players.

On 22 June 2018 Josip Vuković signed a three-year professional contract with Marítimo.

On 4 January 2023, Vuković joined Saudi club Al-Faisaly on loan.

On 9 July 2023, he signed with Süper Lig club Pendikspor.
