= Alexander Cvetković =

English footballer (born 1996)

Alexander Cvetkovic
Personal information
- Full name: Alexander Zoran Cvetkovic
- Date of birth: 29 November 1996 (age 29)
- Place of birth: London, England
- Height: 1.85 m (6 ft 1 in)
- Position: Defensive midfielder

Team information
- Current team: Etzella Ettelbruck

Youth career
- 2001–2003: RKSV Blauw-Zwart
- 2003–2005: HVV Den Haag
- 2005: HV & CV Quick
- 2006–2008: West Ham United
- 2008–2011: Tottenham Hotspur
- 2011–2013: Manchester United
- 2014–2015: Wigan Athletic

Senior career*
Years	Team	Apps	(Gls)
2016–2018	Fola Esch	16	(0)
2020–2021	Fola Esch	11	(2)
2021	Šibenik	8	(0)
2022	Hrvatski Dragovoljac	7	(0)
2023	Eintracht Trier	12	(2)
2023–2024	Rot Weiss Ahlen	23	(0)
2025	San Ignacio	4	(0)
2025–2026	Penybont	18	(2)
2026–	Etzella Ettelbruck	3	(1)
- * Club domestic league appearances and goals as of 08:59, 24 August 2026 (UTC)

Alexander Zoran Cvetkovic (born 29 November 1996) is an English professional footballer who plays as a defensive midfielder for Etzella Ettelbruck. Besides England, he has played in the Netherlands, Luxembourg and Croatia.

== Club career ==
After a spell in Croatia, on 1 February 2023, Cvetkovic joined Regionalliga Südwest side Eintracht Trier on a contract until the end of the season. In June 2023, he signed for Regionalliga West side Rot Weiss Ahlen on a free transfer. In January 2025, Cvetkovic joined Tercera Federación side San Ignacio. He made four appearances during his time in Spain. In July 2025, Cvetković signed for Penybont, first featuring on the bench for the side in their Conference League qualifying match against Kauno Žalgiris. In July 2026, Cvetković returned to Luxembourg to sign for newly-promoted Luxembourg National Division side Etzella Ettelbruck.

== Career statistics ==
=== Club ===
As of 23 August 2021

Club	Season	League			National Cup		League Cup		Continental		Other		Total	
Club	Season	Division	Apps	Goals	Apps	Goals	Apps	Goals	Apps	Goals	Apps	Goals	Apps	Goals
Fola Esch	2016–17	Luxembourg National Division	13	0	1 (Note: Appearances in the Luxembourg Cup)	2	–		–		0	0	14	2
Fola Esch	2017–18	Luxembourg National Division	3	0	0	0	1 (Note: Appearances in the Coupe de la Ligue)	0	2 (Note: Appearances in UEFA Europa League qualifying)	0	0	0	6	0
Fola Esch	2020–21	Luxembourg National Division	0	0	1	2	–		–		0	0	1	2
Fola Esch	Total		16	0	2	4	1	0	2	0	0	0	21	2
Šibenik	2021–22	1. HNL	8	0	0	0	–		–		0	0	1	0
Career total			24	0	2	4	3	0	2	0	0	0	22	2
