= Mario Ćurić =

Croatian association football player

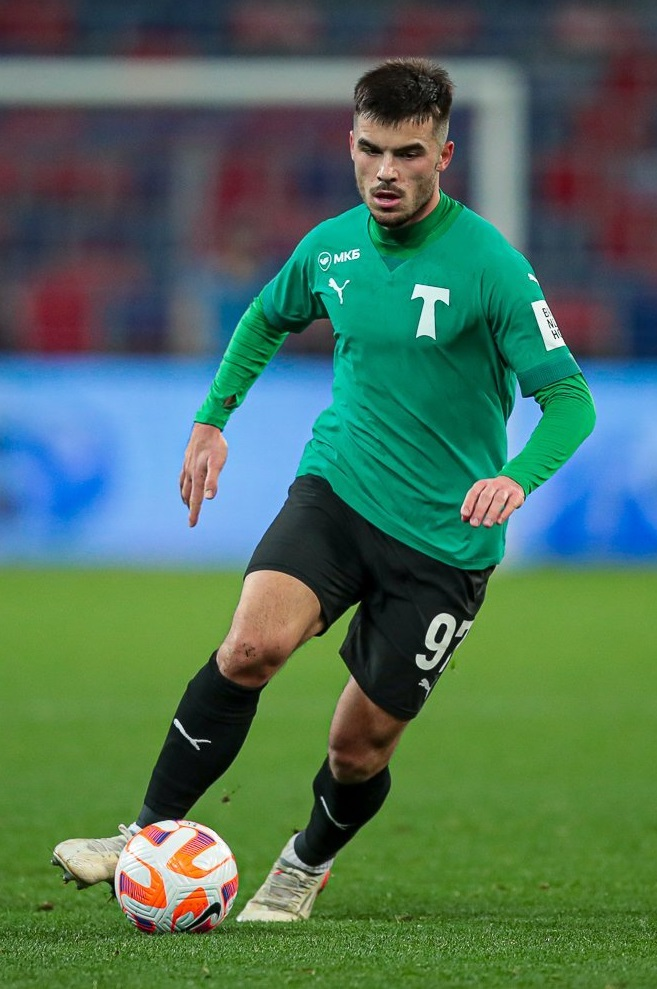
- Ćurić with Torpedo Moscow in 2022

Personal information
- Date of birth: 28 September 1998 (age 28)
- Place of birth: Split, Croatia
- Height: 1.82 m (6 ft 0 in)
- Position: Midfielder

Team information
- Current team: FC Torpedo Moscow
- Number: 97

Youth career
- –2017: Hajduk Split

Senior career*
Years	Team	Apps	(Gls)
2017–2018	Hajduk Split II	28	(3)
2018–2019	Solin	23	(2)
2019–2022	Šibenik	95	(9)
2022–	Torpedo Moscow	95	(6)

International career^{‡}
2013	Croatia U-16	1	(0)
2023	Croatia U-23	1	(0)
- * Club domestic league appearances and goals as of 16 May 2026 ‡ National team caps and goals as of 9 June 2023

Mario Ćurić (born 28 September 1998) is a Croatian professional footballer who plays as a midfielder for FC Torpedo Moscow of the Russian Premier League.

== Club career ==
In the summer transfer window of 2019, Šibenik signed Ćurić from fellow second league side Solin.

On 8 September 2022, Ćurić signed with FC Torpedo Moscow in Russia.

== International career ==
He has been capped once for Croatia U16 in a friendly game against Kuwait .

== Career statistics ==
As of 24 May 2025

Club	Season	League			Cup		Continental		Total	
Club	Season	Division	Apps	Goals	Apps	Goals	Apps	Goals	Apps	Goals
Hajduk Split II	2017–18	Prva NL	28	3	–		–		28	3
Solin	2018–19	Prva NL	23	2	–		–		23	2
Šibenik	2019–20	Prva NL	19	1	2	0	–		21	1
Šibenik	2020–21	HNL	35	1	2	0	–		37	1
Šibenik	2021–22	HNL	35	7	2	1	–		37	8
Šibenik	2022–23	HNL	6	0	–		–		6	0
Šibenik	Total		95	9	6	1	0	0	101	10
Torpedo Moscow	2022–23	Russian Premier League	17	1	4	1	–		21	2
Torpedo Moscow	2023–24	Russian First League	27	0	1	0	–		28	0
Torpedo Moscow	2024–25	Russian First League	29	4	0	0	–		29	4
Torpedo Moscow	Total		73	5	5	1	0	0	78	6
Career total			219	19	11	2	0	0	230	21
