= Marcos Mina =

Colombian footballer (born 1999)

Personal information
- Full name: Marcos David Mina Lucumí
- Date of birth: 12 April 1999 (age 27)
- Place of birth: Cali, Colombia
- Height: 1.77 m (5 ft 10 in)
- Position: Defender

Team information
- Current team: América de Cali
- Number: 14

Youth career
- –2017: Deportes Quindío

Senior career*
Years	Team	Apps	(Gls)
2018–2021	Boca Juniors de Cali	37	(0)
2021–2023	Šibenik	63	(2)
2023–	América de Cali	61	(0)
- * Club domestic league appearances and goals as of 11 December 2025

Marcos David Mina Lucumí (born 12 April 1999) is a Colombian footballer who currently plays as a defender for América de Cali.

== Career statistics ==
=== Club ===
As of 1 April 2024.

Club	Division	League			Cup		Other		Total	
Club	Division	Season	Apps	Goals	Apps	Goals	Apps	Goals	Apps	Goals
Boca Juniors de Cali	Categoría Primera B	2018	15	0	1	0	0	0	16	0
Boca Juniors de Cali	Categoría Primera B	2019	22	0	2	0	0	0	24	0
Boca Juniors de Cali	Total		37	0	3	0	0	0	40	0
Šibenik	1. HNL	2020–21	10	0	1	0	0	0	11	0
Šibenik	1. HNL	2021–22	23	1	1	0	0	0	24	1
Šibenik	1. HNL	2022–23	30	1	3	0	0	0	33	1
Šibenik	Total		63	2	5	0	0	0	68	2
América de Cali	Categoría Primera A	2023	15	0	1	0	0	0	16	0
Career total			100	2	8	0	0	0	108	2
