= Amer Hiroš =

Bosnian footballer (born 1996)

Personal information
- Date of birth: 10 June 1996 (age 30)
- Place of birth: Sarajevo, Bosnia and Herzegovina
- Height: 1.82 m (6 ft 0 in)
- Position: Winger

Team information
- Current team: Borac Banja Luka
- Number: 12

Youth career
- –2014: Željezničar

Senior career*
Years	Team	Apps	(Gls)
2014–2016	Željezničar	4	(0)
2016	→ Goražde (loan)	12	(1)
2016–2017	Goražde	20	(2)
2017–2021	Mladost Doboj Kakanj	82	(9)
2019	→ Olimpik (loan)	14	(0)
2021–2023	Osijek	36	(2)
2023	→ Šibenik (loan)	16	(1)
2024	Željezničar	26	(4)
2025–	Borac Banja Luka	57	(6)

International career
2014	Bosnia and Herzegovina U18	2	(0)
2014–2015	Bosnia and Herzegovina U19	6	(0)
- * Club domestic league appearances and goals as of 20 September 2026

Amer Hiroš (born 10 June 1996) is a Bosnian professional footballer who plays as a winger for Bosnian Premier League club Borac Banja Luka.

== Club career ==
=== Željezničar ===
After passing through all the youth levels at hometown club Željezničar in two years, Hiroš appeared seven times for the senior team, including one appearance in the 2015–16 Europa League qualifiers against Balzan. In that game, he came on in the 84th minute, replacing Zoran Kokot.

=== Goražde ===
In February 2016, Hiroš was loaned to Goražde until the end of the half-season. He signed for Goražde immediately the same summer after his contract with Želježničar expired. He left the club in 2017.

=== Mladost Doboj Kakanj ===
In July 2017, Hiroš signed for Bosnian Premier League club Mladost Doboj Kakanj. In Mladost, he showed his qualities, but in January 2019 he was sent on loan to Olimpik until the end of the season. After returning from his loan, Hiroš became a standard member of the first team. After four years, he left the club.

=== Osijek ===
In July 2021, Hiroš signed for Croatian Prva HNL club Osijek on a free transfer. On 25 January 2023, he signed for Šibenik on loan until the end of season. He returned to Osijek following the end of his loan. He left the club by mutual consent in January 2024.

=== Return to Željezničar ===
On 22 January 2024, Hiroš returned to Željezničar, signing a deal until the end of the year. He made his first appearance since his return to the club on 17 February 2024, in a 0–0 home draw against Zrinjski Mostar. He scored his first goal for Željezničar in a 3–0 home win against Sarajevo in the city derby on 3 March 2024.

On 14 April 2024, Hiroš was sent off after a straight red card in the Sarajevo derby. On 1 January 2025, he left Željezničar after deciding not to renew his contract with the club.

== Career statistics ==
=== Club ===
As of match played 20 September 2026

Appearances and goals by club, season and competition
Club	Season	League			National cup (Note: Includes Bosnian Cup, Croatian Cup)		Continental		Other		Total	
Club	Season	Division	Apps	Goals	Apps	Goals	Apps	Goals	Apps	Goals	Apps	Goals
Željezničar	2014–15	Bosnian Premier League	0	0	0	0	0	0	—		0	0
Željezničar	2015–16	Bosnian Premier League	4	0	2	0	1 (Note: Appearance in UEFA Europa League)	0	—		7	0
Željezničar	Total		4	0	2	0	1	0	—		7	0
Goražde (loan)	2015–16	First League of FBiH	12	1	0	0	—		—		12	1
Goražde	2016–17	First League of FBiH	20	2	2	0	—		—		22	2
Mladost Doboj Kakanj	2017–18	Bosnian Premier League	28	1	1	0	—		—		29	1
Mladost Doboj Kakanj	2018–19	Bosnian Premier League	13	0	1	0	—		—		14	0
Mladost Doboj Kakanj	2019–20	Bosnian Premier League	17	1	0	0	—		—		17	1
Mladost Doboj Kakanj	2020–21	Bosnian Premier League	24	7	1	0	—		—		25	7
Mladost Doboj Kakanj	Total		82	9	3	0	—		—		85	9
Olimpik (loan)	2018–19	First League of FBiH	14	0	0	0	—		—		14	0
Osijek	2021–22	Prva HNL	26	2	4	0	4 (Note: Appearances in UEFA Europa Conference League)	0	—		34	2
Osijek	2022–23	Prva HNL	5	0	1	0	0	0	—		6	0
Osijek	2023–24	Prva HNL	5	0	1	0	2	0	—		8	0
Osijek	Total		36	2	6	0	6	0	—		48	2
Šibenik (loan)	2022–23	Prva HNL	16	1	3	0	—		—		19	1
Željezničar	2023–24	Bosnian Premier League	12	2	—		—		—		12	2
Željezničar	2024–25	Bosnian Premier League	14	2	1	0	—		—		15	2
Željezničar	Total		26	4	1	0	—		—		27	4
Borac Banja Luka	2024–25	Bosnian Premier League	14	1	4	1	—		1 (Note: Appearance in Bosnian Supercup)	0	19	2
Borac Banja Luka	2025–26	Bosnian Premier League	35	4	1	0	2	0	—		38	4
Borac Banja Luka	2026–27	Bosnian Premier League	8	1	0	0	7 (Note: One appearance in UEFA Champions League, six appearances and one goal in UEFA Conference League)	1	—		15	2
Borac Banja Luka	Total		557	6	5	1	9	1	1	0	72	8
Career total			267	25	22	1	16	1	1	0	306	27
