= Juan Camilo Mesa =

Colombian footballer (born 1998)

Personal information
- Full name: Juan Camilo Mesa Antúnez
- Date of birth: 23 February 1998 (age 28)
- Place of birth: Los Patios, Norte de Santander, Colombia
- Height: 1.85 m (6 ft 1 in)
- Position: Defender

Team information
- Current team: Drita
- Number: 5

Youth career
- –2017: Atlético Bucaramanga

Senior career*
Years	Team	Apps	(Gls)
2017	Atlético Bucaramanga	2	(0)
2018–2021	América de Cali	10	(0)
2020–2021	→ Šibenik (loan)	22	(1)
2021–2023	Šibenik	45	(1)
2023	Tuzla City	0	(0)
2023–2024	Dinamo	5	(0)
2024–	Drita	43	(1)

International career
2019	Colombia U23	1	(1)
- * Club domestic league appearances and goals as of 26 June 2025

Juan Camilo Mesa Antúnez (born 23 February 1998) is a Colombian footballer who plays as a defender for Drita in Kosovo.

== Club career ==
Born in Los Patios in the Norte de Santander Department of Colombia, Mesa began his career with Atlético Bucaramanga, making two league appearances in the 2017 season. He moved to fellow top-flight club América de Cali for the 2018 season, but struggled to establish himself in the first team in his first season. The 2019 season was more productive for Mesa, notching a number of appearances during the season.

However, the following year he once again fell out of favour, and was linked with a move away from the club to an unnamed club in Croatia. This was later revealed to be Croatian First Football League side Šibenik, and Mesa joined the club in August 2020, initially on a one-year loan deal with an option to buy. He joined the club alongside compatriots Juan Nieva and Yeferson Contreras.

After Šibenik took up the option to buy Mesa, he spent another two seasons with the club before joining Bosnia and Herzegovina side Tuzla City. However, he left the club shortly after joining, without making an appearance, and moved to Albania, joining Dinamo City.

== International career ==
Mesa was called up to the Colombian under-23 side in August 2019, ahead of friendlies against Argentina and Brazil the following month. He did not feature in the game against Brazil, but scored Colombia's goal in the 3–1 loss to Argentina on 8 September.

== Career statistics ==
=== Club ===
As of 12 January 2024.

Appearances and goals by club, season and competition
Club	Season	League			Cup (Note: Includes Copa Colombia, Serbian Cup, Bosnia and Herzegovina Cup and Albanian Cup)		Continental		Other		Total	
Club	Season	Division	Apps	Goals	Apps	Goals	Apps	Goals	Apps	Goals	Apps	Goals
Atlético Bucaramanga	2017	Categoría Primera A	2	0	4	0	0	0	0	0	6	0
América de Cali	2018	Categoría Primera A	1	0	0	0	0	0	0	0	1	0
América de Cali	2019	Categoría Primera A	8	0	7	0	0	0	0	0	15	0
América de Cali	2020	Categoría Primera A	1	0	0	0	0	0	0	0	1	0
América de Cali	2021	Categoría Primera A	0	0	0	0	0	0	0	0	0	0
América de Cali	Total		10	0	7	0	0	0	0	0	17	0
Šibenik (loan)	2020–21	1. HNL	22	1	2	0	–		0	0	22	1
Šibenik	2021–22	1. HNL	12	1	0	0	–		0	0	12	1
Šibenik	2022–23	1. HNL	33	0	5	0	–		0	0	38	0
Šibenik	Total		67	2	7	0	0	0	0	0	74	2
Tuzla City	2023–24	Liga 12	0	0	0	0	–		0	0	0	0
Dinamo City	2023–24	Kategoria Superiore	5	0	2	0	–		0	0	7	0
Career total			94	2	20	0	0	0	0	0	114	2
