= Niko Rak =

Croatian footballer (born 2003)

Personal information
- Date of birth: 26 July 2003 (age 23)
- Place of birth: Šibenik, Croatia
- Height: 1.73 m (5 ft 8 in)
- Position: Midfielder

Team information
- Current team: Dobrudzha
- Number: 14

Youth career
- 2011–2020: Šibenik

Senior career*
Years	Team	Apps	(Gls)
2020–2023	Šibenik	44	(0)
2023–2025	Konyaspor	5	(0)
2025–2026	Primorje	38	(1)
2026	Dobrudzha	5	(0)

International career^{‡}
2019	Croatia U16	3	(0)
2019	Croatia U17	2	(0)
2021–2022	Croatia U19	8	(1)
2022	Croatia U20	1	(0)
2023	Croatia U21	2	(0)
- * Club domestic league appearances and goals as of 22 September 2026 ‡ National team caps and goals as of 20 September 2025

Niko Rak (born 26 July 2003) is a Croatian footballer who plays for plays for Bulgarian club Dobrudzha as a midfielder.

== Club career ==
On 28 August 2020 he played his first match for Šibenik, coming on as a substitute for Mario Ćurić in the 79th minute in a match against Gorica. On 7 August 2021 he made his first start for Šibenik in a match against Slaven Belupo.

== International career ==
Niko Rak has played internationally for Croatia at under-16, under-17 and under-19 levels.
