= Karlo Bilić =

Croatian footballer

Personal information
- Date of birth: 6 September 1993 (age 33)
- Place of birth: Split, Croatia
- Height: 1.88 m (6 ft 2 in)
- Position: Centre-back

Team information
- Current team: Rudar Velenje

Youth career
- 2004–2011: Orkan Dugi Rat
- 2011–2012: RNK Split

Senior career*
Years	Team	Apps	(Gls)
2012–2014	Orkan Dugi Rat		
2015	Dugopolje	1	(0)
2015	Slavija Sarajevo	2	(0)
2016	Orkan Dugi Rat		
2016–2017	VSS Košice	23	(3)
2017–2018	Železiarne Podbrezová	11	(0)
2017	→ Železiarne Podbrezová II	2	(0)
2019–2022	Šibenik	72	(5)
2023	Koper	11	(0)
2023–	Ħamrun Spartans	0	(0)
- * Club domestic league appearances and goals as of 5 June 2023

Karlo Bilić (born 6 September 1993) is a Croatian professional footballer who plays as a defender for Ħamrun Spartans.

== Club career ==
=== Železiarne Podbrezová ===
Bilić made his professional debut for Železiarne Podbrezová against Spartak Trnava on 29 July 2017.

=== Šibenik ===
On 14 February 2019, Bilić signed with Šibenik.

== Honours ==
Šibenik

- Croatian Second League: 2019–20
