= Ivan Delić (Croatian footballer) =

Croatian footballer (born 1998)

Personal information
- Date of birth: 29 September 1998 (age 28)
- Place of birth: Split, Croatia
- Height: 1.86 m (6 ft 1 in)
- Position: Forward

Team information
- Current team: Dugopolje
- Number: 9

Youth career
- Hajduk Split

Senior career*
Years	Team	Apps	(Gls)
2017–2019	Hajduk Split II	37	(13)
2017–2021	Hajduk Split	15	(0)
2020	→ Istra 1961 (loan)	14	(2)
2020	→ NK Varaždin (loan)	13	(1)
2021	Slaven Belupo	13	(1)
2021–2025	Šibenik	74	(19)
2023	→ Cosenza (loan)	13	(0)
2025	→ Bravo (loan)	8	(0)
2025	Široki Brijeg	14	(0)
2026–	Dugopolje	14	(1)

International career
2013	Croatia U15	7	(0)
2014	Croatia U16	2	(0)
2015	Croatia U17	3	(0)
2015	Croatia U18	4	(0)
- * Club domestic league appearances and goals as of 16 June 2026

Ivan Delić (born 29 September 1998) is a Croatian professional footballer who plays as a forward for Dugopolje.

== Club career ==
Born in Split, Delić graduated from the youth academy of Hajduk Split and was promoted to the reserves ahead of the 2017–18 season. On 29 October 2017, he made his first team debut, coming on as a substitute for Ivan Pešić in a 0–0 draw against Slaven Belupo.

On 17 April 2018, Delić signed his first professional contract, penning a deal until 2021.

On 31 January 2023, Delić joined Cosenza in the Italian second-tier Serie B on loan, with an option to buy.

== International career ==
On 10 October 2015, Delić was called to the under-17 team for the Under-17 World Cup.

== Career statistics ==
As of match played on 26 August 2018

Club	Season	League			Cup		Continental		Total	
Club	Season	Division	Apps	Goals	Apps	Goals	Apps	Goals	Apps	Goals
Hajduk Split II	2017–18	Druga HNL	29	9	—		—		29	9
Hajduk Split II	2018–19	Druga HNL	8	4	—		—		8	4
Hajduk Split II	Total		37	13	—		—		37	13
Hajduk Split	2017–18	Prva HNL	2	0	0	0	0	0	2	0
Hajduk Split	2018–19	Prva HNL	2	0	0	0	1 (Note: Appearance in UEFA Europa League)	0	3	0
Hajduk Split	Total		4	0	0	0	1	0	5	0
Career total			41	13	0	0	1	0	42	13
