= Stadion Šubićevac =

Association football stadium in Šibenik, Croatia

Coordinates: 43.7435533°N 15.8960581°E

- Šubićevac; Šubija
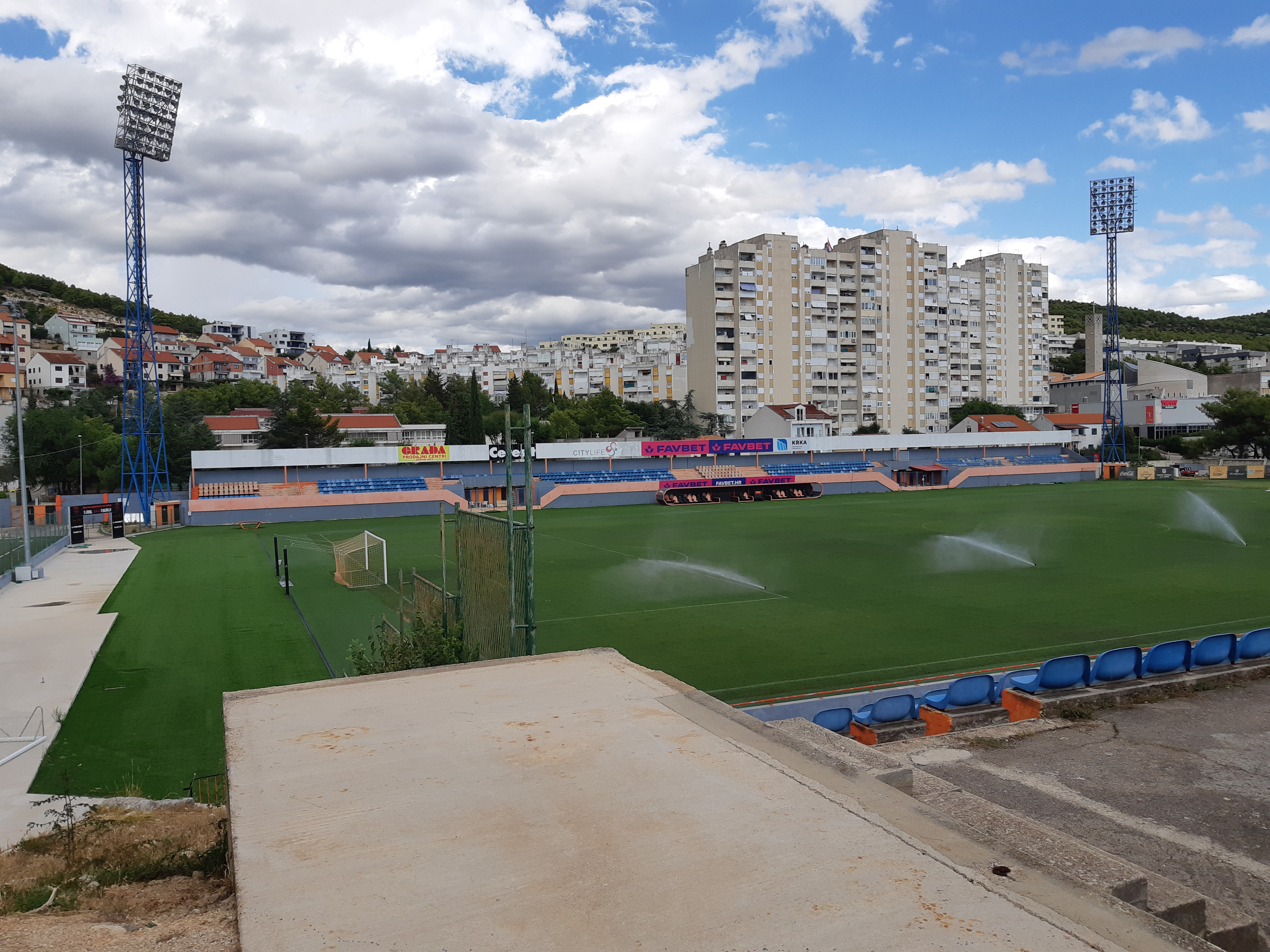
- Interactive map of Stadion Šubićevac
- Full name: Stadion Šubićevac
- Former names: Stadion Rade Končar
- Location: Šibenik, Croatia
- Owner: City of Šibenik
- Operator: GNK Šibenik
- Capacity: 3,412

Construction
- Built: 1946–1948
- Opened: 1 May 1948; 78 years ago
- Renovated: 1951, 1979, 2000, 2020
- Expanded: 1955, 1979

Tenants
- HNK Šibenik (1948–2026); GNK Šibenik (2026–present); Croatia (2003–present)

Stadion Šubićevac (English: Šubićevac Stadium, pronounced [ˈstâdioːn ˈʃubitɕevats]), also known simply as Šubićevac, is an association football stadium in Šibenik, Croatia. It is the home stadium of GNK Šibenik football club. The stadium has a capacity of 3,412, all of which is seated.

The stadium was in the Communist era named after the Yugoslav Partisan leader Rade Končar and known as Stadion Rade Končar. Last time it was renovated in the summer of 2020.

It was the home stadium of the HNK Šibenik football club until its dissolution in 2026.

== History ==
Construction of a new stadium began in early 1946, as part of the sports complex which featured a football pitch, athletics track, courts for tennis, basketball and volleyball and concrete stands. The location chosen for the project was an area called Šubićevac, which is where Rade Končar, a notable Second World War anti-fascist fighter, was executed by the Italian army along with 25 other members of the resistance. The stadium was hence named Stadion Rade Končar (English: Rade Končar Stadium) in memory of him.

The first phase of the construction went on for two years, and the stadium broke ground on 1 May 1948, when a friendly match was played between Šibenik and Hajduk Split. Several football games as part of the 1979 Mediterranean Games, hosted by nearby Split, were also played on the stadium. For this occasion, the east stand was constructed, while the west stand was renovated.

The final of the 2019–20 Croatian Cup between Rijeka and Lokomotiva was played on the stadium on 1 August 2020.

== International matches ==
Date	Competition	Teams	Score
21 September 1979	1979 Mediterranean Games	(Socialist Federal Republic of Yugoslavia) Yugoslavia vs. Egypt	3–0
9 February 2003	Friendly	Croatia vs. (North Macedonia) Macedonia	2–2
12 October 2014	2015 UEFA European Under-19 Championship qualification	Croatia vs. Turkey	0–0
11 November 2015	2017 UEFA European Under-21 Championship qualification	Croatia vs. San Marino	4–0
10 September 2019	2021 UEFA European Under-21 Championship qualification	Croatia vs. Scotland	1–2
