= HNK Hajduk Split Reserves and Academy =

Akademija Luka Kaliterna
- Full name: Akademija HNK Hajduk ˝Luka Kaliterna˝
- Founded: 18 March 1919; 107 years ago
- Ground: Stadion Poljud Training Ground 2
- Capacity: 2,000
- Chairman: Ivan Bilić
- Manager: Goran Sablić
- Website: hajduk.hr/eng/club/hajduk-II
Home colours	Away colours

Academy Luka Kaliterna is the youth team of HNK Hajduk Split. There are a total of ten age categories within the academy, the oldest being u-19 and youngest u-8.

From the 2014–15 season, HNK Hajduk Split Reserves was formed and replaced the U-19 team to compete in Croatia's reorganised Third Division. The newly formed reserve teams in Croatian football replaced U-19 teams, with the national U-19 competition dissolved before formed again the next year, during 2015–16 season. The new reserve teams are not able to play in the same division as their senior teams. Therefore, Hajduk II is ineligible for promotion to the Prva HNL and may progress only up to Druga HNL as long as the senior team is in Prva HNL. Reserve team is also not permitted to enter the Croatian Cup. The reserve team is intended to be the final step between the academy and the first team, and is made up of promising youngsters between the age of 18 and 21, with up to five players over the age of 21 eligible to play each week. Hajduk II team stopped existing at the end of season 20-21 due to high costs, and small benefit.

== Current squad (Hajduk U-19) ==
As of 10 November 2025

Note: Flags indicate national team as defined under FIFA eligibility rules; some limited exceptions apply. Players may hold more than one non-FIFA nationality.

No.	Pos.	Nation	Player
—	GK	USA	Adrian Hrvojevic
—	GK	CRO	Ivan Pocrnjic
—	GK	CRO	Niko Pavičić Ivelja
—	DF	CRO	Roko Gabric
—	DF	CRO	Niko Sablić
—	DF	CRO	Antonio Beidenegl
—	DF	CRO	Duje Milisic
—	DF	CRO	Mateo Čupić
—	DF	CRO	Ivan Jurilj
—	DF	CRO	Zvonimir Hrastović
—	DF	CRO	Ante Bartulović
—	MF	CRO	Luka Burić
—	MF	CRO	Roko Vojvodić

No.	Pos.	Nation	Player
—	MF	CRO	Davor Bistre
—	MF	CRO	Ivano Ora
—	MF	CRO	Sebastijan Kajtazi
—	MF	CRO	Filip Bokan
—	MF	UKR	Ilya Kutya
—	FW	CRO	Duje Pranić
—	FW	CRO	Bruno Mišura
—	FW	CRO	Šime Perko
—	FW	CRO	Duje Matić
—	FW	UKR	Dmytro Zudin
—	FW	UKR	Ante Bralić

=== Players with multiple nationalities ===
- (Croatia) (Australia) Noa Skoko
- (Canada) (Croatia) Niko Sigur
- (Bosnia and Herzegovina) (Croatia) Ante Prusina
- (United States) (Croatia) Mark Hrvojević

=== Out on loan ===
As of 1 February 2023

Note: Flags indicate national team as defined under FIFA eligibility rules; some limited exceptions apply. Players may hold more than one non-FIFA nationality.

No.	Pos.	Nation	Player
—	DF	CRO	Ivan Dominić (at KuPS until 12 August 2023)
—	GK	CRO	Luigi Mišević (at Šibenik until 30 June 2023)

No.	Pos.	Nation	Player
—	MF	CRO	Ivo Čengić (at Dugopolje until 30 June 2023)
—	FW	CRO	Leonardo Petrović (at Jadran LP until 30 June 2023)

Source: Hajduk.hr

=== Recent seasons ===
Season	League									Cup	Top goalscorer	
Season	Division	P	W	D	L	F	A	Pts	Pos	Cup	Player	Goals
2017–18	1. HNL	22	16	2	4	62	29	50	2nd	QF	Jurica Bajić	14
2018–19	1. HNL	26	16	7	3	77	22	55	3rd	QF	Jurica Bajić, Ivan Šarić	9
2019–20	1. HNL	17	13	3	1	50	13	42	1st	SF	Marin Ljubičić	15
2020–21	1. HNL	26	24	1	1	81	13	73	1st	SF	Marin Ljubičić	25
2021–22	1. HNL	30	22	7	1	76	16	73	1st	SF	Filip Čuić	15
2022–23	1. HNL	16	12	2	2	36	11	38	2nd	SF	Jere Vrcić	7

== Current squad (Hajduk U-17) ==
Some players are listed on both Hajduk U-19 and Hajduk U-17 teams as they play games for both teams.

As of 1 February 2023

Note: Flags indicate national team as defined under FIFA eligibility rules; some limited exceptions apply. Players may hold more than one non-FIFA nationality.

No.	Pos.	Nation	Player
—	GK	CRO	Ivan Bosančić
—	GK	CRO	Toni Pažur
—	GK	CRO	Raul Bezeljak
—	GK	CRO	Marin Biočić
—	DF	CRO	Niko Fridl
—	DF	CRO	Ivan Krstanović
—	DF	CRO	Duje Milišić
—	DF	CRO	Toni Perajica
—	DF	CRO	Roko Tudor
—	DF	AUS	Nicholas Zdrilić
—	DF	CRO	Marino Skelin
—	MF	CRO	Dominik Tolja
—	MF	CRO	Luka Hodak
—	MF	CRO	Marin Ćalušić

No.	Pos.	Nation	Player
—	MF	CRO	Noa Skoko
—	MF	CRO	Ivano Carević
—	MF	CRO	Mateo Lekaj
—	MF	CRO	Duje Reić
—	MF	CRO	Ivano Ora
—	FW	CRO	Marino Žeravica
—	FW	CRO	Andro Marušić
—	FW	CRO	Patrik Prodanović
—	FW	CRO	Marin Kuzmanić
—	FW	CRO	Bruno Durdov
—	FW	CRO	Toma Žunić
—	FW	CRO	Lovre Lončar
—	FW	CRO	Duje Matić

=== Recent seasons ===
Season	League									Cup	Top goalscorer	
Season	Division	P	W	D	L	F	A	Pts	Pos	Cup	Player	Goals
2013–14	1. HNL	30	19	4	7	61	35	61	3rd	Round of 16	Boris Rapaić	14
2014–15	1. HNL	30	14	6	10	46	34	48	5th	SF	Ivan Delić	10
2015–16	1. HNL	30	22	6	2	87	27	72	2nd	RU	Ivan Vujčić	20
2016–17	1. HNL	30	22	3	5	97	31	69	2nd	RU	Michele Šego	22
2017–18	1. HNL	23	19	3	1	84	25	60	1st	Finals	Ivan Šarić	21
2018–19	1. HNL	15	10	5	0	34	9	35	2nd	QF	David Katuša	7

== Current squad (Hajduk U-15) ==
As of 1 February 2023

Note: Flags indicate national team as defined under FIFA eligibility rules; some limited exceptions apply. Players may hold more than one non-FIFA nationality.

No.	Pos.	Nation	Player
—	GK	CRO	Roko Mašković
—	GK	CRO	Ivan Pocrnjić
—	GK	CRO	Josip Pandurić
—	DF	CRO	Vice Rados
—	DF	CRO	Ivano Papić
—	DF	CRO	Antonio Beidenegl
—	DF	CRO	Mateo Čupić
—	DF	CRO	Karlo Gabrilo
—	DF	CRO	Ante Bartulović
—	MF	UKR	Illya Kutya
—	MF	CRO	Silvio Ivanišević Dvornik
—	MF	CRO	Roko Vojvodić

No.	Pos.	Nation	Player
—	MF	CRO	Mateo Juričić
—	MF	CRO	Marin Tapalović
—	MF	CRO	Davor Bistre
—	MF	CRO	Filip Bokan
—	MF	CRO	Roko Jenjić
—	MF	CRO	Gabrijel Čirjak
—	MF	CRO	Gabrijel Vukičević
—	FW	CRO	Šime Perko
—	FW	CRO	Lovre Šuvar
—	FW	UKR	Dmytro Zudin
—	FW	AUS	Noah Ivan Slunjski

=== Recent seasons ===
Season	League									Cup	Top goalscorer	
Season	Division	P	W	D	L	F	A	Pts	Pos	Cup	Player	Goals
2014–15	1. HNL	30	23	6	1	90	16	75	2nd	RU	Jakov Blagaić	22
2015–16	1. HNL	30	19	7	4	78	23	64	2nd	Round of 16	Bruno Jenjić	23
2016–17	1. HNL	30	20	4	6	49	15	64	2nd	W	Marin Ljubičić	9
2017–18	1. HNL	26	19	3	4	57	11	60	2nd	Finals	Leonardo Petrović	23
2018–19	1. HNL	15	12	1	2	32	7	37	2nd	SF	Mislav Petrović	13

=== Hajduk 2 recent seasons ===
Season	League									Top goalscorer	
Season	Division	P	W	D	L	F	A	Pts	Pos	Player	Goals
2014–15	3. HNL South	34	18	5	11	65	42	59	5th	Ivan Prskalo	11
2015–16	3. HNL South	34	14	8	12	49	36	50	5th	Robert Jandrek	10
2016–17	3. HNL South	34	23	5	6	86	29	74	1st ↑	Deni Jurić	15
2017–18	2. HNL	33	15	5	13	44	32	50	5th	Ivan Delić	9
2018–19	2. HNL	26	12	7	7	36	29	43	4th	Ivan Delić	7
2019–20	2. HNL	19	7	6	6	29	23	27	6th	Jurica Bajić	8
2020–21	2. HNL	34	11	8	15	58	60	41	15th	Ivan Šarić	13

Key

League: P = Matches played; W = Matches won; D = Matches drawn; L = Matches lost; F = Goals for; A = Goals against; Pts = Points won; Pos = Final position.

== Current staff ==
Updated 22 June 2024

Staff	Job title
(Croatia) Goran Sablić	Head of Youth Academy
(Croatia) Hrvoje Vuković	Head of Youth Academy Assistant
(Croatia) Mate Radić	Talent scout
(Croatia) Zlatko Jerković	Under-19 Manager
(Croatia) Ivan Vukasović	Under-18 Manager
(Croatia) Luka Vučko	Under-17 Manager
(Croatia) Frane Lojić	Under-16 Manager
(Croatia) Zlatko Jerković	Under-15 Manager
(Croatia) Marin Nerlović	Under-14 Manager
(Croatia) Ante Puljiz	Under-13 Manager
(Croatia) Roko Španjić	Under-12 Manager
(Croatia) Ante Vitaić	Under-11 Manager
(Croatia) Ivan Rako	Under-10 Manager
(Croatia) Mario Lovreković	Under-9 Manager
(Croatia) Josip Vardić	Under-8 Manager
(Croatia) Ivica Roguljić	Goalkeeper Coach Coordinator
(Croatia) Nikša Butara	U-18 and U-16 Goalkeeping coach
(Croatia) Goran Blažević	U-17 and U-15 Goalkeeping coach
(Croatia) Mateo Bebić	U-14 and U-13 Goalkeeping coach
(Croatia) Marko Čagalj	U-12 and U-11 Goalkeeping coach
(Croatia) Marko Županović	U-10, U-9 and U-8 Goalkeeping coach
(Croatia) Vinko Bego	Individual coach
(Croatia) Joško Španjić	Individual coach
(Croatia) Marko Sičić	Individual coach
(Croatia) Danijel Vušković	Individual coach

== UEFA Youth League record ==
Season	Stage	Round	Opponent	Home	Away	Agg.
2021–22	Domestic Champions Path	1R	(North Macedonia) Shkëndija	3–1	2–0	5–1
2021–22	Domestic Champions Path	2R	(Belarus) Minsk	3–0	1–1	4–1
2021–22	Domestic Champions Path	PO	(Spain) Atlético Madrid	0–0 (2–3 p)		
2022–23	Domestic Champions Path	1R	(Azerbaijan) Gabala	3–0	2–1	5–1
2022–23	Domestic Champions Path	2R	(Albania) Apolonia	3–1	3–0	6–1
2022–23	Domestic Champions Path	PO	(Ukraine) Shakhtar Donetsk	1–0		
2022–23	Domestic Champions Path	R16	(England) Manchester City	2–1		
2022–23	Domestic Champions Path	QF	(Germany) Borussia Dortmund		1–1 (9–8 p)	
2022–23	Domestic Champions Path	SF	(Italy) Milan	3–1		
2022–23	Domestic Champions Path	Final	(Netherlands) AZ Alkmaar	0–5		

== Honours ==
Honours	No.	Years
Domestic leagues
(Croatia) Croatian U-18 Football League Champions	22	1949, 1953, 1956, 1957, 1965, 1969, 1970, 1971, 1975, 1978, 1982, 1985, 1988, 1989, 1990, 1991, 1995, 1997, 1998, 2004, 2005, 2012, 2021
(Croatia) Croatian U-17 Football League Champions	7	1995, 1996, 1997, 2001, 2004, 2005, 2012
(Socialist Federal Republic of Yugoslavia) Yugoslav U-18 Football League Champions	5	1952, 1970, 1971, 1978, 1985
Domestic cups
(Socialist Federal Republic of Yugoslavia) Yugoslav U-18 Cup Winners	6	1970, 1971, 1972, 1977, 1979, 1980
International
(European Union) Kvarnerska rivijera U-18 (Rijeka, Croatia) Winners	11	1953, 1958, 1972, 1979, 1980, 1988, 1990, 1994, 1997, 1998, 2000
(European Union) Supercup Tournament U-18 (Bern, Switzerland) Winners	1	1998
(European Union) Hopes Tournament U-20 (Monthey, Switzerland) Winners	2	1997, 1998
(European Union) Jugend Cup U-17 (Bludenz, Vorarlberg, Austria) Winners	1	1995
(European Union) International Youth Friendly Tournament U-18 (San Giorgio, Italy) Winners	2	1989, 1993
(European Union) Primo torneo internationale di calcio U-18 (Santa Teressa di Gallura, Sardegna, Italy) Winners	1	1977
(European Union) Tournament International Juniors U-19 (Croix, France) Winners	2	1971, 1972
