= 2019–20 HNK Hajduk Split season =

Hajduk Split
2019–20 season
- Chairman: Marin Brbić
- Manager: Siniša Oreščanin (until 19 July 2019); Damir Burić (20 July 2019 - 16 December 2019); Igor Tudor (from January 2020)
- Prva HNL: 5th
- Croatian Cup: Second round
- Europa League: First qualifying round
- Top goalscorer: League: Mijo Caktaš (20); All: Mijo Caktaš (20)
- Highest home attendance: 29,359 (vs. Dinamo) (31 August 2019)
- Lowest home attendance: 0 (Three matches)
| Home colours | Away colours |

The 2019–20 season was the 109th season in Hajduk Split’s history and their twenty-ninth in the Prva HNL.

== First-team squad ==
For details of former players, see List of HNK Hajduk Split players.

As of 19 July 2020

Note: Flags indicate national team as defined under FIFA eligibility rules; some limited exceptions apply. Players may hold more than one non-FIFA nationality.

| No. | Pos. | Nation | Player |
|---|---|---|---|
| 4 | DF | BUL | Kristian Dimitrov |
| 5 | MF | GAM | Hamza Barry |
| 6 | MF | CRO | Darko Nejašmić |
| 7 | FW | CRO | Leon Kreković |
| 8 | DF | CZE | Stefan Simić |
| 9 | FW | CRO | Marin Jakoliš |
| 10 | MF | CRO | Mijo Caktaš |
| 11 | FW | NGR | Samuel Eduok |
| 13 | GK | CRO | Goran Blažević |
| 17 | DF | CRO | Josip Juranović (captain) |
| 18 | DF | BIH | Nihad Mujakić (on loan from Kortrijk) |
| 19 | MF | CRO | Mario Čuić |
| 21 | FW | BRA | Jairo |
| 23 | FW | CRO | Ivan Brnić |

| No. | Pos. | Nation | Player |
|---|---|---|---|
| 24 | MF | CRO | Stanko Jurić |
| 29 | DF | AUT | Stipe Vučur |
| 30 | DF | CRO | Josip Bašić |
| 31 | DF | CRO | Ivan Dolček |
| 34 | DF | ALB | Ardian Ismajli |
| 35 | DF | CRO | David Čolina |
| 40 | GK | CRO | Marin Ljubić |
| 44 | DF | CRO | Mario Vušković |
| 47 | FW | ALB | Francesco Tahiraj |
| 55 | DF | CRO | Stipe Radić |
| 70 | GK | CRO | Josip Posavec |
| 77 | DF | KOS | Lumbardh Dellova |
| 93 | MF | LBN | Bassel Jradi |

== Competitions ==
=== Overview ===
| Competition | First match | Last match | Starting round | Final position | Record | | | | | | | |
| Competition | First match | Last match | Starting round | Final position | Pld | W | D | L | GF | GA | GD | Win % |
|---|---|---|---|---|---|---|---|---|---|---|---|---|
| HT Prva liga | 21 July 2019 | 25 July 2020 | Matchday 1 | 5th | 36 | 18 | 6 | 12 | 60 | 41 | +19 | 50.00 |
| Croatian Cup | 25 September 2019 | 30 October 2019 | First round | Second round | 2 | 1 | 0 | 1 | 3 | 2 | +1 | 50.00 |
| Europa League | 9 July 2019 | 18 July 2019 | First qualifying round | First qualifying round | 2 | 1 | 0 | 1 | 3 | 3 | +0 | 50.00 |
| Total | | | | | 40 | 20 | 6 | 14 | 66 | 46 | +20 | 50.00 |

Source: Soccerway

=== HT Prva liga ===
==== Classification ====
| Pos | Team | Pld | W | D | L | GF | GA | GD | Pts | Qualification or relegation |
|---|---|---|---|---|---|---|---|---|---|---|
| 3 | Rijeka | 36 | 19 | 7 | 10 | 58 | 42 | +16 | 64 | Qualification for the Europa League third qualifying round |
| 4 | Osijek | 36 | 17 | 11 | 8 | 47 | 29 | +18 | 62 | Qualification for the Europa League second qualifying round |
| 5 | Hajduk Split | 36 | 18 | 6 | 12 | 60 | 41 | +19 | 60 | Qualification for the Europa League second qualifying round |
| 6 | Gorica | 36 | 12 | 13 | 11 | 44 | 48 | −4 | 49 | |
| 7 | Slaven Belupo | 36 | 10 | 9 | 17 | 34 | 51 | −17 | 39 | |

Source: PrvaHNL.hr
Rules for classification: 1) Points; 2) Head-to-head points; 3) Head-to-head goal difference; 4) Head-to-head goals scored (at home if two teams tied); 5) Goal difference; 6) Goals scored; 7) Play-off
(Note: Criteria 2-4 and 7 is only used if deciding champion, teams to international competition or teams for relegation and in that case criteria 6 will not be used).

==== Results summary ====
| Overall | | | | | | | | Home | | | | | | Away | | | | | |
| Pld | W | D | L | GF | GA | GD | Pts | W | D | L | GF | GA | GD | W | D | L | GF | GA | GD |
|---|---|---|---|---|---|---|---|---|---|---|---|---|---|---|---|---|---|---|---|
| 36 | 18 | 6 | 12 | 53 | 30 | +23 | 60 | 13 | 0 | 5 | 32 | 14 | +18 | 5 | 6 | 7 | 21 | 16 | +5 |

Last updated: 25 July 2020.
Source: Competitive matches

==== Results by round ====
| Round | 1 | 2 | 3 | 4 | 5 | 6 | 7 | 8 | 9 | 10 | 11 | 12 | 13 | 14 | 15 | 16 | 17 | 18 | 19 | 20 | 21 | 22 | 23 | 24 | 25 | 26 | 27 | 28 | 29 | 30 | 31 | 32 | 33 | 34 | 35 | 36 |
|---|---|---|---|---|---|---|---|---|---|---|---|---|---|---|---|---|---|---|---|---|---|---|---|---|---|---|---|---|---|---|---|---|---|---|---|---|
| Ground | H | A | H | A | H | A | H | A | H | A | H | A | H | A | H | A | H | A | H | A | H | A | H | A | H | A | H | A | H | A | H | A | H | A | H | A |
| Result | W | W | W | L | W | L | W | D | W | D | W | D | W | L | W | D | L | D | W | W | W | L | W | D | L | L | W | W | L | L | W | L | L | W | L | W |
| Position | 2 | 2 | 2 | 2 | 2 | 2 | 1 | 1 | 1 | 1 | 1 | 2 | 2 | 2 | 2 | 2 | 2 | 2 | 2 | 2 | 2 | 2 | 2 | 2 | 2 | 4 | 3 | 2 | 3 | 5 | 2 | 4 | 5 | 5 | 5 | 5 |

Source: Competitive matches
A = Away; H = Home; W = Win; D = Draw; L = Loss

==== Results by opponent ====
| Team | Results | | | | Points |
| Team | 1 | 2 | 3 | 4 | Points |
|---|---|---|---|---|---|
| Dinamo Zagreb | 1–0 | 1–1 | 0–2 | 3–2 | 7 |
| Gorica | 3–0 | 1–2 | 6–0 | 1–3 | 6 |
| Inter Zaprešić | 3–1 | 1–1 | 2–1 | 4–1 | 10 |
| Istra 1961 | 2–0 | 1–1 | 2–1 | 1–0 | 10 |
| Lokomotiva | 3–0 | 0–0 | 1–0 | 2–3 | 7 |
| Osijek | 0–1 | 3–2 | 0–0 | 0–1 | 4 |
| Rijeka | 1–1 | 0–4 | 0–2 | 2–3 | 1 |
| Slaven Belupo | 1–2 | 2–0 | 1–2 | 2–1 | 6 |
| Varaždin | 3–0 | 2–0 | 3–0 | 2–3 | 9 |

Source: 2019–20 Croatian First Football League article

== Matches ==
=== Friendlies ===
==== Pre-season ====
| 21 June 2019 Friendly | Solin | 1–4 | Hajduk Split | Solin, Croatia |
| 17:45 | Barišić 36' | Report | Jurić 24'; Teklić 57', 59'; Gyurcsó 72' | Stadium: Stadion pokraj Jadra; Attendance: 1,100; Referee: Toni Bešker (Solin) |

| 29 June 2019 Friendly | Krylia Sovetov (Russia) | 1–2 | (Croatia) Hajduk Split | Rogoza, Slovenia |
| | Sobolev 48' | Report | Delić 14'; Gyurcsó 18' |

| 30 June 2019 Friendly | Aluminij (Slovenia) | 1–0 | (Croatia) Hajduk Split | Kidričevo, Slovenia |
| | Štor 12' | Report | | Stadium: Aluminij Sports Park |

| 3 July 2019 Friendly | Śląsk Wrocław (Poland) | 2–1 | (Croatia) Hajduk Split | Slovenske Konjice, Slovenia |
| | Golla 19', 41' | Report | Šego 90' |

| 4 July 2019 Friendly | Zorya Luhansk (Ukraine) | 1–1 | (Croatia) Hajduk Split | Limbuš, Slovenia |
| | Abu Hanna 52' | Report | Nejašmić 40' | Stadium: Pod Grajskim gričem |

==== On-season ====
| 4 September 2019 Friendly | OSK Otok | 0–5 | Hajduk Split | Otok, Croatia |
| | | Report | Delić 9'; Jakoliš 23'; Kalik 44', 84'; Skorup 65' | Stadium: ŠC Gola brda |

| 25 November 2019 Friendly | Omladinac Vranjic | 0–1 | Hajduk Split | Vranjic, Croatia |
| | | Report | Teklić 65' | Stadium: SC Kava |

==== Mid-season ====
| 14 January 2020 Friendly | Hajduk Split (Croatia) | 1–1 | (Switzerland) Grasshoper | Belek, Turkey |
| 17:45 | Caktaš 86' | Report | Momoh 60' |

| 17 January 2020 Friendly | Hajduk Split (Croatia) | 5–0 | (Hungary) Honvéd | Belek, Turkey |
| | Kreković 13'; Jurić 31'; Eduok 72'; Caktaš 78', 90' | Report |

| 20 January 2020 Friendly | Hajduk Split (Croatia) | 3–1 | (North Macedonia) Vardar | Belek, Turkey |
| | Kreković 73', 85'; Teklić 82' | Report | Micevski 12' |

| 24 January 2020 Friendly | Hajduk Split (Croatia) | 1–0 | (Ukraine) Dynamo Kyiv | Belek, Turkey |
| | Radić 90' | Report |

=== HT Prva liga ===
| 21 July 2019 1 | Hajduk Split | 2–0 | Istra 1961 | Split |
| 20:00 CEST (UTC+02:00) | Simić 8'; Caktaš (yellow card) 35'; Nejašmić (yellow card) 82'; Barry 88' | Report | Rufati (yellow card) 74' | Stadium: Stadion Poljud; Attendance: 8,248; Referee: Tihomir Pejin (Donji Miholjac) |

| 28 July 2019 2 | Varaždin | 0–3 | Hajduk Split | Varaždin |
| 20:00 CEST (UTC+02:00) | Jertec (yellow card) 20'; Đurasek (yellow card) 90+2' | Report | Simić (yellow card) 47'; Dolček 49'; Caktaš 55'; Hamza (yellow card) 76'; Eduok 86' | Stadium: Stadion Varteks; Attendance: 5,132; Referee: Fran Jović (Zagreb) |

| 4 August 2019 3 | Hajduk Split | 3–0 | Lokomotiva | Split |
| 18:00 CEST (UTC+02:00) | Caktaš 40'; Eduok 43'; Nejašmić 56'; Simić (yellow card) 77'; Kalik (yellow card) 90' | Report | | Stadium: Stadion Poljud; Attendance: 15,156; Referee: Ivan Bebek (Rijeka) |

| 11 August 2019 4 | Slaven Belupo | 2–1 | Hajduk Split | Koprivnica |
| 18:00 CEST (UTC+02:00) | Krstanović (yellow card) 29' (goal) 84' (pen.); Puclin 37' (yellow card) 52'; M. Delić (yellow card) 42'; Zirdum (yellow card) 69'; Bogojević (yellow card) 76' (yellow-red card) 79'; Karamarko (yellow card) 88' | Report | Simić (yellow card) 28'; Svatok (yellow card) 87'; Ismajli (yellow card) 84'; Eduok (yellow card) 86' (goal) 90+6'; Dolček (yellow card) 90+4' | Stadium: Gradski Stadion Ivan Kušek Apaš; Attendance: 2,789; Referee: Marko Matoc (Zaprešić) |

| 18 August 2019 5 | Hajduk Split | 3–0 | Gorica | Split |
| 18:00 CEST (UTC+02:00) | Jairo 30', 67'; Eduok (yellow card) 32'; Caktaš (yellow card) 45+1'; Ismajli (yellow card) 45+2'; Kalik (yellow card) 56'; Hamza (yellow card) 64'; Juranović 69' | Report | Lovrić (yellow card) 30'; Čabraja (yellow card) 30'; Dvorneković (yellow card) 45+1'; Steenvoorden (yellow card) 45+1'; Ndiaye (yellow card) 45+1' (yellow-red card) 60' | Stadium: Stadion Poljud; Attendance: 14,054; Referee: Marin Vidulin (Kanfanar) |

| 25 August 2019 6 | Osijek | 1–0 | Hajduk Split | Osijek |
| 20:00 CEST (UTC+02:00) | Mance 34' (yellow card) 54'; Marić (yellow card) 38'; Kleinheisler (yellow card) 66'; Žaper (yellow card) 90+1' | Report | Eduok (yellow card) 26'; Nejašmić (yellow card) 47'; Ismajli (yellow card) 90+3' | Stadium: Stadion Gradski vrt Attendance: 7,354; Referee: Igor Pajač (Sveti Ivan Zelina) |

| 31 August 2019 7 | Hajduk Split | 1–0 | Dinamo Zagreb | Split |
| 18:30 CEST (UTC+02:00) | Jradi 56' (yellow card) 58' (yellow-red card) 80'; Caktaš (yellow card) 68'; Ljubić (yellow card) 90+4' | Report | Leovac (yellow card) 55'; Hajrović (yellow card) 71'; Dilaver (red card) 75'; Ademi (yellow card) 76' (yellow-red card) 76'; Gavranović (yellow card) 84' | Stadium: Stadion Poljud; Attendance: 29,359; Referee: Damir Batinić (Osijek) |

| 15 September 2019 8 | Rijeka | 1–1 | Hajduk Split | Rijeka |
| 19:00 CEST (UTC+02:00) | Andrijašević 31'; Capan (yellow card) 64' | Report | Jurić (yellow card) 25'; Jairo (yellow card) 40'; Jakoliš (yellow card) 58'; Bradarić (yellow card) 66'; Teklić 78' | Stadium: Stadion Rujevica; Attendance: 7,108; Referee: Fran Jović (Zagreb) |

| 22 September 2019 9 | Hajduk Split | 3–1 | Inter Zaprešić | Split |
| 16:30 CEST (UTC+02:00) | Barry (yellow card) 27'; Caktaš 41' (pen.); Jurić 46'; Ismajli (yellow card) 71'; Jairo 86' | Report | Serderov 49'; Mazalović (yellow card) 58' (yellow-red card) 90+2' | Stadium: Stadion Poljud; Attendance: 13,175; Referee: Dario Bel (Osijek) |

| 29 September 2019 10 | Istra 1961 | 1–1 | Hajduk Split | Pula |
| 19:00 CEST (UTC+02:00) | Galilea (yellow card) 18'; Pavić (yellow card) 68'; Lončar 80' (yellow card) 80'; Čondrić (yellow card) 88' | Report | Jradi (yellow card) 14'; Caktaš 35' (yellow card) 75'; Bradarić (yellow card) 42'; Simić (yellow card) 88' | Stadium: Stadion Aldo Drosina; Attendance: 4,569; Referee: Fran Jović (Zagreb) |

| 5 October 2019 11 | Hajduk Split | 2–0 | Varaždin | Split |
| 15:00 CEST (UTC+02:00) | Jairo 21'; Nejašmić 65'; Edouk (yellow card) 79' | Report | Štefulj (yellow card) 33'; Adžić (yellow card) 73'; M. Senić (yellow card) 79' (yellow-red card) 90'; Prce (yellow card) 81' | Stadium: Stadion Poljud; Attendance: 7,945; Referee: Marin Vidulin (Kanfanar) |

| 20 October 2019 12 | Lokomotiva | 0–0 | Hajduk Split | Zagreb |
| 17:30 CEST (UTC+02:00) | Kastrati (yellow card) 54' | Report | Bradarić (yellow card) 17'; Svatok (yellow card) 59'; Simić (yellow card) 90+1' | Stadium: Stadion Kranjčevićeva; Attendance: 4,120; Referee: Ivan Bebek (Rijeka) |

| 26 October 2019 13 | Hajduk Split | 2–0 | Slaven Belupo | Split |
| 15:00 CEST (UTC+02:00) | Jairo 14'; Barry (yellow card) 53'; Juranović 74' | Report | Bogojević (yellow card) 22'; Puclin (yellow card) 24' | Stadium: Stadion Poljud; Attendance: 9,045; Referee: Dario Bel (Osijek) |

| 2 November 2019 14 | Gorica | 2–1 | Hajduk Split | Velika Gorica |
| 17:30 CET (UTC+01:00) | Lovrić 11' (yellow card) 67'; Suk (yellow card) 51' (yellow-red card) 90+2' (goal) 86'; Musa Muhammed (yellow card) 71'; Marina (yellow card) 82' | Report | Jairo 28'; Ismajli (yellow card) 72'; Caktaš (yellow card) 85'; Bradarć (yellow card) 88' | Stadium: Stadion Radnik; Attendance: 3,753; Referee: Tihomir Pejin (Donji Miholjac) |

| 10 November 2019 15 | Hajduk Split | 3–2 | Osijek | Split |
| 15:00 CET (UTC+01:00) | Caktaš 22'; Edouk (yellow card) 33' (goal) 41'; Barry (yellow card) 60'; Jairo (yellow card) 67' (yellow-red card) 73' (goal) 72'; Vušković (red card) 75' | Report | Škorić (yellow card) 13'; Mance (yellow card) 15'; Lopa (yellow card) 29'; Žaper 43'; Marić 52'; Silva (yellow card) 59'; Bočkaj (yellow card) 62' | Stadium: Stadion Poljud; Attendance: 7,805; Referee: Igor Pajač (Sveti Ivan Zelina) |

| 22 November 2019 16 | Dinamo Zagreb | 1–1 | Hajduk Split | Zagreb |
| 18:00 CET (UTC+01:00) | Ismajli 12' (o.g.); Leovac (yellow card) 44'; Hajrović (yellow card) 90+3' | Report | Simić (yellow card) 15'; Ismajli (yellow card) 23'; Kalik (yellow card) 27'; Caktaš 45+1' (pen.) | Stadium: Stadion Maksimir; Attendance: 15,757; Referee: Ivan Bebek (Rijeka) |

| 1 December 2019 17 | Hajduk Split | 0–4 | Rijeka | Split |
| 17:30 CET (UTC+01:00) | Nejašmić (yellow card) 20'; Jradi (yellow card) 42'; Caktaš (yellow card) 49'; Hamza (yellow card) 86'; Jurić (yellow card) 90+5' | Report | Acosty (yellow card) 15' (goal) 43'; Raspopović 83'; Gorgon 87'; Andrijaševićć (yellow card) 89'; Halilović 90+3' (yellow card) 90+5'; Prskalo (yellow card) 90+5' | Stadium: Stadion Poljud; Attendance: 13,605; Referee: Fran Jović (Zagreb) |

| 7 December 2019 18 | Inter Zaprešić | 1–1 | Hajduk Split | Zaprešić |
| 17:30 CET (UTC+01:00) | Simić 26' (o.g.); Postonjski (yellow card) 37'; Mazalović (yellow card) 49'; Grgić (yellow card) 51' | Report | Kalik (yellow card) 35'; Eduok 42'; Jurić (yellow card) 45' | Stadium: Stadion ŠRC Zaprešić; Attendance: 1,620; Referee: Mario Zebec (Varaždin) |

| 15 December 2019 19 | Hajduk Split | 2–1 | Istra 1961 | Split |
| 17:30 CET (UTC+01:00) | Tahiraj (yellow card) 11'; Jairo (yellow card) 15'; Simić (yellow card) 38'; Caktaš 62', 69' | Report | Pavić (yellow card) 28'; Fintić 43'; Rubić (red card) 90+1' | Stadium: Stadion Poljud; Attendance: 6,262; Referee: Ivan Bebek (Rijeka) |

| 2 February 2020 20 | Varaždin | 0–3 | Hajduk Split | Varaždin |
| 15:00 CET (UTC+01:00) | Glavina (yellow card) 16'; Roca (yellow card) 53'; Stolnik (yellow card) 71' | Report | Caktaš (penalty missed) 15'; Tahiraj (yellow card) 19'; Jradi 42' (yellow card) 76'; Caktaš 72' (pen.); Eduok 90+3' (pen.) | Stadium: Stadion Varteks; Attendance: 5,043; Referee: Tihomir Pejin (Donji Miholjac) |

| 8 February 2020 21 | Hajduk Split | 1–0 | Lokomotiva | Split |
| 17:30 CET (UTC+01:00) | Eduok 28'; Jakoliš (yellow card) 69'; Mujakić (red card) 85'; Kreković (yellow card) 90+3' | Report | Kolinger (yellow card) 38'; Tuci (yellow card) 62'; Jakić (yellow card) 86' | Stadium: Stadion Poljud; Attendance: 11,870; Referee: Igor Pajač (Sveti Ivan Zelina) |

| 15 February 2020 22 | Slaven Belupo | 2–1 | Hajduk Split | Koprivnica |
| 17:30 CET (UTC+01:00) | Bačelić-Grgić 45+3'; Goda (yellow card) 56'; Bogojević (yellow card) 69'; Krstanović 88' | Report | Eduok 14'; Jurić (yellow card) 22' (yellow-red card) 37'; Ismajli (yellow card) 90+3' | Stadium: Gradski Stadion Ivan Kušek Apaš; Attendance: 2,912; Referee: Igor Pajač (Sveti Ivan Zelina) |

| 22 February 2020 23 | Hajduk Split | 6–0 | Gorica | Split |
| 15:00 CET (UTC+01:00) | Kreković 10'; Jairo 35', 56' (pen.); Caktaš 39', 47'; Eduok 80'; Dimitrov (yellow card) 90+2' | Report | Čabraja (yellow card) 9'; Kalik (yellow card) 54'; Mathieu (yellow card) 65' | Stadium: Stadion Poljud; Attendance: 8,487; Referee: Ivan Bebek (Rijeka) |

| 29 February 2020 24 | Osijek | 0–0 | Hajduk Split | Osijek |
| 15:00 CET (UTC+01:00) | Bočkaj (yellow card) 43'; Mance (yellow card) 89' | Report | Barry (yellow card) 57'; Jradi (yellow card) 67'; Dimitrov (yellow card) 72' | Stadium: Stadion Gradski vrt Attendance: 6,593; Referee: Fran Jović (Zagreb) |

| 4 March 2020 25 | Hajduk Split | 0–2 | Dinamo Zagreb | Split |
| 19:00 CET (UTC+01:00) | Ismajli (yellow card) 12' (yellow-red card) 40' | Report | Dilaver (yellow card) 38'; Petković (yellow card) 45+2'; Kadzior 47'; Ademi (yellow card) 40' (goal) 74' | Stadium: Stadion Poljud; Attendance: 22,436; Referee: Ivan Bebek (Rijeka) |

| 8 March 2020 26 | Rijeka | 2–0 | Hajduk Split | Rijeka |
| 17:30 CET (UTC+01:00) | Raspopović (yellow card) 30'; Capan (yellow card) 42'; Čolak 61'; Gorgon 72' (pen.) | Report | Mujakić (yellow card) 37'; Jakoliš (yellow card) 59'; Caktaš (yellow card) 71' | Stadium: Stadion Rujevica; Attendance: 7,326; Referee: Damir Batinić (Osijek) |

| 5 June 2020 27 | Hajduk Split | 2–1 | Inter Zaprešić | Split |
| 20:00 CEST (UTC+02:00) | Hamza (yellow card) 36'; Caktaš 60' (pen.) (yellow card) 82'; Ismajli (yellow card) 90+3'; Dimitrov 90+7' | Report | Mamut (yellow card) 30' (goal) 37'; Mlinar (yellow card) 59' | Stadium: Stadion Poljud; Attendance: 0 Referee: Zdenko Lovrić (Đakovo) |

| 11 June 2020 28 | Istra 1961 | 0–1 | Hajduk Split | Pula |
| 21:05 CEST (UTC+02:00) | Blagojević (yellow card) 47'; Obeng (yellow card) 87'; Čondrić (yellow card) 90+1'; Močinić (yellow card) 90+1' | Report | Caktaš 6'; Ismajli (yellow card) 57'; Dolček (yellow card) 90'; Jradi (yellow card) 90+1' | Stadium: Stadion Aldo Drosina; Attendance: 0 Referee: Damir Batinić (Osijek) |

| 16 June 2020 29 | Hajduk Split | 2–3 | Varaždin | Split |
| 18:55 CEST (UTC+02:00) | Vušković 49'; Caktaš 74'; Hamza (yellow card) 90+4' | Report | Drožđek 19', 40'; Mamić 24'; Teklić (yellow card) 63' | Stadium: Stadion Poljud; Attendance: 0 Referee: Ivan Vučković (Zagreb) |

| 21 June 2020 30 | Lokomotiva | 3–2 | Hajduk Split | Zagreb |
| 21:05 CEST (UTC+02:00) | Çokaj (yellow card) 41'; Kolinger 45+1', 90+7' (yellow card) 72'; Tuci 63'; Uzuni (yellow card) 77' | Report | Caktaš 3', 36' (pen.); Vušković (yellow card) 22'; Jradi (yellow card) 47' | Stadium: Stadion Kranjčevićeva; Attendance: 1,590; Referee: Damir Batinić (Osijek) |

| 26 June 2020 31 | Hajduk Split | 2–1 | Slaven Belupo | Split |
| 21:05 CEST (UTC+02:00) | Caktaš 10' (pen.); Vušković (yellow card) 29'; Čolina (yellow card) 41'; Eduok 60'; Dimitrov (yellow card) 89' | Report | Međimorec 25'; Havelka (yellow card) 51'; Mateus (penalty missed) 90' | Stadium: Stadion Poljud; Attendance: 4,253; Referee: Mario Zebec (Osijek) |

| 30 June 2020 32 | Gorica | 3–1 | Hajduk Split | Velika Gorica |
| 21:05 CEST (UTC+02:00) | Hamad 8'; Suk 43'; M.Musa (yellow card) 45'; Ndiaye 53'; Jovičić (yellow card) 55' | Report | Ismajli (yellow card) 34'; Jakoliš 45' | Stadium: Stadion Radnik; Attendance: 1,700; Referee: Ivan Bebek (Rijeka) |

| 5 July 2020 33 | Hajduk Split | 0–1 | Osijek | Split |
| 18:55 CEST (UTC+02:00) | Jradi (yellow card) 6'; Tahiraj (yellow card) 39'; Radić (yellow card) 45' | Report | Bočkaj 15'; Špoljarić (yellow card) 35'; Pilj (yellow card) 65' | Stadium: Stadion Poljud; Attendance: 5,816; Referee: Mario Zebec (Osijek) |

| 12 July 2020 34 | Dinamo Zagreb | 2–3 | Hajduk Split | Zagreb |
| 21:05 CEST (UTC+02:00) | Ivanušec 13'; Gojak (yellow card) 45+1' (yellow-red card) 45+4'; Oršić 61'; Dilaver (yellow card) 85' | Report | Caktaš (penalty missed) 20'; Dimitrov (yellow card) 25'; Vušković (yellow card) 28'; Čuić 31', 81'; Čolina (yellow card) 53'; Théophile-Catherine 86' (o.g.) | Stadium: Stadion Maksimir; Attendance: 1,967; Referee: Ivan Bebek (Rijeka) |

| 19 July 2020 35 | Hajduk Split | 2–3 | Rijeka | Split |
| 21:05 CEST (UTC+02:00) | Eduok 39'; Jurić (yellow card) 63'; Caktaš 69' (pen.) | Report | Čolak 19', 45' (yellow card) 45+1'; Halilović (yellow card) 57'; Braut (yellow card) 72'; Lepinjica (yellow card) 90'; Galović 90+2' | Stadium: Stadion Poljud; Attendance: 0 Referee: Damir Batinić (Osijek) |

| 25 July 2020 36 | Inter Zaprešić | 1–4 | Hajduk Split | Zaprešić |
| 18:55 CEST (UTC+02:00) | Mamut (yellow card) 26'; Soldo (yellow card) 65' (yellow-red card) 72'; Andrić 90+3' | Report | Dimitrov (yellow card) 36'; Vušković (yellow card) 49' (yellow-red card) 50'; Caktaš 57', 75'; Grgić 63' (o.g.); Jairo (yellow card) 71'; Jradi 90+1'; Radić (yellow card) 90+2' | Stadium: Stadion ŠRC Zaprešić; Attendance: 0 Referee: Fran Jović (Zagreb) |

Source: Croatian Football Federation

=== Croatian Cup ===
| 25 September 2019 R1 | Mladost Petrinja | 0–2 | Hajduk Split | Petrinja |
| 15:30 CEST (UTC+02:00) | | Report | Ljubić (yellow card) 11'; Kalik 32'; Jairo 90+1' | Stadium: Gradski stadion Attendance: 2,500; Referee: Tihomir Pejin (Donji Miholjac) |

| 30 October 2019 R2 | Gorica | 2–1 | Hajduk Split | Velika Gorica |
| 17:00 CEST (UTC+02:00) | Suk (yellow card) 58' (goal) 85'; Lovrić 64'; Čović (yellow card) 88'; Zwoliński (yellow card) 89' | Report | Caktaš (yellow card) 19'; Bradarić (yellow card) 63'; Posavec (yellow card) 65'; Ismajli (yellow card) 81'; Jairo (yellow card) 88'; Jurić 89' | Stadium: Stadion Radnik; Attendance: 3,011; Referee: Fran Jović (Zagreb) |

Source: Croatian Football Federation

=== UEFA Europa League ===
==== First qualifying round ====
| 9 July 2019 First leg | Gżira United (Malta) | 0–2 | (Croatia) Hajduk Split | Ta' Qali, Malta |
| 18:00 CEST (UTC+02:00) | | Report | Gyurcsó 44'; Jurić (yellow card) 73'; Dolček (yellow card) 90+5' (goal) 90+6' | Stadium: Centenary Stadium; Attendance: 683; Referee: Gal Leibovitz (Israel) |

| 18 July 2019 Second leg | Hajduk Split (Croatia) | 1–3 (3–3a agg.) | (Malta) Gżira United | Split, Croatia |
| 20:00 CEST (UTC+02:00) | Jradi 7' | Report | Corbalan (yellow card) 30'; Jefferson 57'; Koné 69', 90+6'; Barbosa (yellow card) 80'; Conti (yellow card) 90+2' | Stadium: Stadion Poljud; Attendance: 18,236; Referee: Nikolas Neokleous (Cyprus) |

Source: uefa.com

== Player seasonal records ==
Updated 8 April 2021

=== Goals ===
| Rank | Name | League | Europe | Cup | Total |
|---|---|---|---|---|---|
| 1 | (Croatia) Mijo Caktaš | 20 | – | – | 20 |
| 2 | (Nigeria) Samuel Eduok | 11 | – | – | 11 |
| 3 | (Brazil) Jairo | 9 | – | 1 | 10 |
| 4 | (Lebanon) Bassel Jradi | 3 | 1 | – | 4 |
| 5 | (Croatia) Darko Nejašmić | 2 | – | – | 2 |
| 5 | (Croatia) Josip Juranović | 2 | – | – | 2 |
| 5 | (Croatia) Mario Čuić | 2 | – | – | 2 |
| 5 | (Croatia) Ivan Dolček | 1 | 1 | – | 2 |
| 5 | (Croatia) Stanko Jurić | 1 | – | 1 | 2 |
| 6 | (Czech Republic) Stefan Simić | 1 | – | – | 1 |
| 6 | (The Gambia) Hamza Barry | 1 | – | – | 1 |
| 6 | (Croatia) Tonio Teklić | 1 | – | – | 1 |
| 6 | (Croatia) Leon Kreković | 1 | – | – | 1 |
| 6 | (Croatia) Mario Vušković | 1 | – | – | 1 |
| 6 | (Bulgaria) Kristian Dimitrov | 1 | – | – | 1 |
| 6 | (Croatia) Marin Jakoliš | 1 | – | – | 1 |
| 6 | (Hungary) Ádám Gyurcsó | – | 1 | – | 1 |
| 6 | (Australia) Anthony Kalik | – | – | 1 | 1 |
| Own goals | | 2 | – | – | 2 |
| TOTALS | | 60 | 3 | 3 | 66 |

Source: Competitive matches

=== Clean sheets ===
| Rank | Name | League | Europe | Cup | Total |
|---|---|---|---|---|---|
| 1 | (Croatia) Josip Posavec | 10 | – | – | 10 |
| 2 | (Croatia) Marin Ljubić | 2 | – | 1 | 3 |
| 3 | (Croatia) Tomislav Duka | 1 | 1 | – | 2 |
| TOTALS | | 13 | 1 | 1 | 15 |

Source: Competitive matches

=== Disciplinary record ===
| Number | Position | Player | 1. HNL | | | Europa League | | | Croatian Cup | | | Total | | |
|---|---|---|---|---|---|---|---|---|---|---|---|---|---|---|
| Number | Position | Player | Yellow card | (yellow card) (yellow-red card) | Red card | Yellow card | (yellow card) (yellow-red card) | Red card | Yellow card | (yellow card) (yellow-red card) | Red card | Yellow card | (yellow card) (yellow-red card) | Red card |
| 4 | DF | (Bulgaria) Kristian Dimitrov | 5 | 0 | 0 | 0 | 0 | 0 | 0 | 0 | 0 | 5 | 0 | 0 |
| 5 | MF | (The Gambia) Hamza Barry | 9 | 0 | 0 | 0 | 0 | 0 | 0 | 0 | 0 | 9 | 0 | 0 |
| 6 | MF | (Croatia) Darko Nejašmić | 3 | 0 | 0 | 0 | 0 | 0 | 0 | 0 | 0 | 3 | 0 | 0 |
| 7 | FW | (Croatia) Leon Kreković | 1 | 0 | 0 | 0 | 0 | 0 | 0 | 0 | 0 | 1 | 0 | 0 |
| 8 | DF | (Czech Republic) Stefan Simić | 7 | 0 | 0 | 0 | 0 | 0 | 0 | 0 | 0 | 7 | 0 | 0 |
| 9 | FW | (Croatia) Marin Jakoliš | 3 | 0 | 1 | 0 | 0 | 0 | 0 | 0 | 0 | 3 | 0 | 1 |
| 10 | MF | (Croatia) Mijo Caktaš | 9 | 0 | 0 | 0 | 0 | 0 | 1 | 0 | 0 | 10 | 0 | 0 |
| 11 | FW | (Nigeria) Samuel Eduok | 6 | 0 | 0 | 0 | 0 | 0 | 0 | 0 | 0 | 6 | 0 | 0 |
| 14 | DF | (Ukraine) Oleksandr Svatok | 2 | 0 | 0 | 0 | 0 | 0 | 0 | 0 | 0 | 2 | 0 | 0 |
| 18 | DF | (Bosnia and Herzegovina) Nihad Mujakić | 1 | 0 | 1 | 0 | 0 | 0 | 0 | 0 | 0 | 1 | 0 | 1 |
| 21 | FW | (Brazil) Jairo | 3 | 1 | 0 | 0 | 0 | 0 | 1 | 0 | 0 | 4 | 1 | 0 |
| 23 | MF | (Australia) Anthony Kalik | 4 | 0 | 0 | 0 | 0 | 0 | 0 | 0 | 0 | 4 | 0 | 0 |
| 24 | MF | (Croatia) Stanko Jurić | 4 | 1 | 0 | 1 | 0 | 0 | 0 | 0 | 0 | 5 | 1 | 0 |
| 28 | MF | (Croatia) Filip Bradarić | 4 | 0 | 0 | 0 | 0 | 0 | 1 | 0 | 0 | 5 | 0 | 0 |
| 31 | DF | (Croatia) Ivan Dolček | 2 | 0 | 0 | 1 | 0 | 0 | 0 | 0 | 0 | 3 | 0 | 0 |
| 34 | DF | (Albania) Ardian Ismajli | 10 | 1 | 0 | 0 | 0 | 0 | 1 | 0 | 0 | 11 | 1 | 0 |
| 35 | DF | (Croatia) David Čolina | 2 | 0 | 0 | 0 | 0 | 0 | 0 | 0 | 0 | 2 | 0 | 0 |
| 40 | GK | (Croatia) Marin Ljubić | 1 | 0 | 0 | 0 | 0 | 0 | 1 | 0 | 0 | 2 | 0 | 0 |
| 44 | DF | (Croatia) Mario Vušković | 4 | 1 | 1 | 0 | 0 | 0 | 0 | 0 | 0 | 4 | 1 | 1 |
| 47 | FW | (Albania) Francesco Tahiraj | 3 | 0 | 0 | 0 | 0 | 0 | 0 | 0 | 0 | 3 | 0 | 0 |
| 55 | DF | (Croatia) Stipe Radić | 2 | 0 | 0 | 0 | 0 | 0 | 0 | 0 | 0 | 2 | 0 | 0 |
| 70 | GK | (Croatia) Josip Posavec | 0 | 0 | 0 | 0 | 0 | 0 | 1 | 0 | 0 | 1 | 0 | 0 |
| 93 | MF | (Lebanon) Bassel Jradi | 7 | 1 | 0 | 0 | 0 | 0 | 0 | 0 | 0 | 7 | 1 | 0 |
| TOTALS | | | 92 | 5 | 3 | 2 | 0 | 0 | 6 | 0 | 0 | 100 | 5 | 3 |

=== Appearances and goals ===
| Number | Position | Player | Apps | Goals | Apps | Goals | Apps | Goals | Apps | Goals |
| Number | Position | Player | Total | | 1. HNL (Note: First number represents appearances in starting eleven, while the second number indicates a substitute appearance.) | | Europa League | | Croatian Cup | |
|---|---|---|---|---|---|---|---|---|---|---|
| 1 | GK | (Croatia) Tomislav Duka | 4 | 0 | 2+0 | 0 | 2+0 | 0 | 0+0 | 0 |
| 3 | DF | (Spain) Borja López | 1 | 0 | 0+0 | 0 | 1+0 | 0 | 0+0 | 0 |
| 4 | DF | (Bulgaria) Kristian Dimitrov | 14 | 1 | 12+2 | 1 | 0+0 | 0 | 0+0 | 0 |
| 5 | MF | (The Gambia) Hamza Barry | 31 | 1 | 24+3 | 1 | 2+0 | 0 | 2+0 | 0 |
| 6 | MF | (Croatia) Darko Nejašmić | 26 | 2 | 20+5 | 2 | 1+0 | 0 | 0+0 | 0 |
| 7 | FW | (Hungary) Ádám Gyurcsó | 2 | 1 | 1+0 | 0 | 1+0 | 1 | 0+0 | 0 |
| 7 | FW | (Croatia) Leon Kreković | 15 | 1 | 4+11 | 1 | 0+0 | 0 | 0+0 | 0 |
| 8 | FW | (Czech Republic) Stefan Simić | 18 | 1 | 16+0 | 1 | 1+0 | 0 | 1+0 | 0 |
| 9 | FW | (Croatia) Marin Jakoliš | 18 | 0 | 6+10 | 1 | 0+0 | 0 | 0+2 | 0 |
| 10 | MF | (Croatia) Mijo Caktaš | 33 | 20 | 32+0 | 20 | 0+0 | 0 | 1+0 | 0 |
| 11 | FW | (Nigeria) Samuel Eduok | 32 | 11 | 20+10 | 11 | 0+0 | 0 | 1+1 | 0 |
| 14 | DF | (Ukraine) Oleksandr Svatok | 9 | 0 | 5+1 | 0 | 2+0 | 0 | 1+0 | 0 |
| 17 | DF | (Croatia) Josip Juranović | 34 | 2 | 32+0 | 2 | 1+0 | 0 | 1+0 | 0 |
| 18 | MF | (Bosnia and Herzegovina) Dino Beširović | 4 | 0 | 0+2 | 0 | 1+0 | 0 | 1+0 | 0 |
| 18 | DF | (Bosnia and Herzegovina) Nihad Mujakić | 9 | 0 | 9+0 | 0 | 0+0 | 0 | 0+0 | 0 |
| 19 | FW | (Croatia) Ivan Delić | 7 | 0 | 0+5 | 0 | 2+0 | 0 | 0+0 | 0 |
| 19 | MF | (Croatia) Mario Čuić | 8 | 2 | 6+2 | 2 | 0+0 | 0 | 0+0 | 0 |
| 20 | FW | (Croatia) Jakov Blagaić | 9 | 0 | 1+8 | 0 | 0+0 | 0 | 0+0 | 0 |
| 21 | FW | (Brazil) Jairo | 37 | 10 | 33+0 | 9 | 2+0 | 0 | 1+1 | 1 |
| 23 | FW | (Croatia) Ivan Brnić | 7 | 0 | 3+4 | 0 | 0+0 | 0 | 0+0 | 0 |
| 23 | MF | (Australia) Anthony Kalik | 11 | 1 | 4+5 | 0 | 0+1 | 0 | 1+0 | 1 |
| 24 | MF | (Croatia) Stanko Jurić | 26 | 2 | 15+7 | 1 | 1+1 | 0 | 2+0 | 1 |
| 28 | MF | (Croatia) Filip Bradarić | 10 | 0 | 9+0 | 0 | 0+0 | 0 | 1+0 | 0 |
| 29 | DF | (Austria) Stipe Vučur | 2 | 0 | 1+1 | 0 | 0+0 | 0 | 0+0 | 0 |
| 30 | DF | (Croatia) Josip Bašić | 5 | 0 | 3+0 | 0 | 1+0 | 0 | 1+0 | 0 |
| 31 | DF | (Croatia) Ivan Dolček | 24 | 2 | 12+9 | 1 | 1+1 | 1 | 1+0 | 0 |
| 33 | DF | (Croatia) Domagoj Bradarić | 1 | 0 | 0+0 | 0 | 1+0 | 0 | 0+0 | 0 |
| 34 | DF | (Albania) Ardian Ismajli | 30 | 0 | 28+0 | 0 | 1+0 | 0 | 1+0 | 0 |
| 35 | DF | (Croatia) David Čolina | 24 | 0 | 18+4 | 0 | 0+0 | 0 | 2+0 | 0 |
| 40 | GK | (Croatia) Marin Ljubić | 9 | 0 | 8+0 | 0 | 0+0 | 0 | 1+0 | 0 |
| 44 | DF | (Croatia) Mario Vušković | 11 | 1 | 8+2 | 1 | 0+0 | 0 | 1+0 | 0 |
| 47 | FW | (Albania) Francesco Tahiraj | 12 | 0 | 8+2 | 0 | 1+1 | 0 | 0+0 | 0 |
| 55 | DF | (Croatia) Stipe Radić | 8 | 0 | 4+4 | 0 | 0+0 | 0 | 0+0 | 0 |
| 70 | GK | (Croatia) Josip Posavec | 27 | 0 | 26+0 | 0 | 0+0 | 0 | 1+0 | 0 |
| 91 | FW | (Croatia) Tonio Teklić | 15 | 1 | 0+13 | 1 | 0+0 | 0 | 1+1 | 0 |
| 93 | MF | (Lebanon) Bassel Jradi | 36 | 4 | 26+7 | 3 | 2+0 | 1 | 1+0 | 0 |

=== Overview of statistics ===
| Statistic | Overall | 1. HNL | Croatian Cup | Europa League |
|---|---|---|---|---|
| Most appearances | Jairo (37) | Jairo, Jradi & Caktaš (33) | 10 players (2) | 14 players (2) |
| Most starts | Jairo (36) | Jairo (33) | 6 players (2) | 7 players (2) |
| Most substitute appearances | Teklić (14) | Teklić (13) | 5 players (1) | 5 players (2) |
| Most minutes played | Jairo (3,113) | Juranović (2,828) | Hamza & Jurić (180) | 5 players (180) |
| Top goalscorer | Caktaš (20) | Caktaš (20) | Jairo, Jurić & Kalik (1) | Dolček, Jradi & Gyurcsó (1) |
| Most assists | Jradi & Jairo (7) | Jradi & Jairo (7) | – | Bašić & Hamza (1) |
| Most yellow cards | Ismajli (11) | Ismajli (10) | 6 players (1) | Jurić & Dolček (1) |
| Most red cards | 6 players (1) | 6 players (1) | – | – |
Last updated: 25 July 2020.

== Transfers ==
=== In ===
| Date | Position | Player | From | Fee |
|---|---|---|---|---|
| 7 June 2019 | GK | (Croatia) Josip Posavec | (Italy) Palermo | 500,000 € |
| 1 July 2019 | DF | (Czech Republic) Stefan Simić | (Italy) Milan | 500,000 € |
| 1 July 2019 | DF | (Croatia) Ivan Dolček | (Croatia) Slaven Belupo | 500,000 € |
| 18 July 2019 | DF | (Croatia) David Čolina | (France) Monaco U21 | 700,000 € |
| 19 July 2019 | FW | (Nigeria) Samuel Eduok | (Turkey) BB Erzurumspor | 250,000 € |
| 25 July 2019 | FW | (Croatia) Marin Jakoliš | (Austria) Admira Wacker | 100,000 € |
| 2 September 2019 | MF | (Croatia) Filip Bradarić | (Italy) Cagliari | Loan |
| 2 September 2019 | FW | (Peru) Iván Bulos | (Portugal) Boavista | Free |
| 19 January 2020 | DF | (Bosnia and Herzegovina) Nihad Mujakić | (Belgium) Kortrijk | Loan |
| 11 February 2020 | DF | (Bulgaria) Kristian Dimitrov | (Bulgaria) Botev Plovdiv | 400,000 € |
| 1 July 2020 | FW | (Hungary) Ádám Gyurcsó | (Hungary) Puskás Akadémia | Loan ended |
| 5 July 2020 | FW | (Greece) Dimitrios Diamantakos | (Germany) St. Pauli | Free |

Total spending: ▼2,950,000 €

=== Out ===
| Date | Position | Player | To | Fee |
|---|---|---|---|---|
| 11 June 2019 | FW | (Croatia) Franko Kovačević | (Croatia) Rudeš | 300,000 € |
| 1 July 2019 | DF | (Croatia) Fran Tudor | | End of contract |
| 1 July 2019 | FW | (North Macedonia) Mirko Ivanovski | | End of contract |
| 1 July 2019 | DF | (Germany) André Fomitschow | | End of contract |
| 3 July 2019 | MF | (Croatia) Ante Palaversa | (England) Manchester City | Loan ended |
| 19 July 2019 | DF | (Croatia) Domagoj Bradarić | (France) Lille | 7,000,000 € |
| 6 August 2019 | DF | (Spain) Borja López | (Spain) Sporting Gijón | 50,000 € |
| 6 August 2019 | DF | (Croatia) Božo Mikulić | (Croatia) Slaven Belupo | Loan |
| 29 August 2019 | FW | (Hungary) Ádám Gyurcsó | (Hungary) Puskás Akadémia | Loan |
| 28 November 2019 | FW | (Peru) Iván Bulos | | Free (released) |
| 1 January 2020 | DF | (Ukraine) Oleksandr Svatok | (Ukraine) SC Dnipro-1 | 350,000 € |
| 3 January 2020 | MF | (Bosnia and Herzegovina) Dino Beširović | (Hungary) Mezőkövesd | Loan |
| 3 January 2020 | GK | (Croatia) Tomislav Duka | (Croatia) Istra 1961 | Free |
| 18 January 2020 | FW | (Croatia) Dario Špikić | (Croatia) Gorica | 200,000 € |
| 18 January 2020 | FW | (Croatia) Michele Šego | (Croatia) Slaven Belupo | Loan |
| 20 January 2020 | GK | (Croatia) Davor Matijaš | (Belgium) Royal Antwerp | 200,000 € |
| 23 January 2020 | MF | (Croatia) Filip Bradarić | (Italy) Cagliari | Loan ended |
| 9 February 2020 | FW | (Croatia) Ivan Delić | (Croatia) Istra 1961 | Loan |
| 9 February 2020 | FW | (Croatia) Tonio Teklić | (Croatia) Varaždin | Loan |
| 18 February 2020 | MF | (Australia) Anthony Kalik | (Croatia) Gorica | Free |
| 1 July 2020 | GK | (Croatia) Goran Blažević | | End of contract |
| 1 July 2020 | DF | (Croatia) Josip Bašić | | End of contract |
| 1 July 2020 | DF | (Austria) Stipe Vučur | | End of contract |
| 1 July 2020 | MF | (Bosnia and Herzegovina) Dino Beširović | (Hungary) Mezőkövesd | 150,000 € |

Total income: ▲8,250,000 €

Total expenditure: ▲5,300,000 €

=== Promoted from youth squad ===
| Position | Player | Age |
|---|---|---|
| DF | (Croatia) Mario Vušković | 18 |
| MF | (Croatia) Mario Čuić | 18 |
| FW | (Croatia) Stipe Radić | 19 |
| FW | (Croatia) Leon Kreković | 19 |
| FW | (Croatia) Jakov Blagaić | 19 |
| FW | (Croatia) Ivan Brnić | 19 |
| FW | (Croatia) Dario Špikić | 20 |
| DF | (Kosovo) Lumbardh Dellova | 21 |
