= 2020–21 HNK Hajduk Split season =

Hajduk Split
2020–21 season
- Chairman: Marin Brbić (until 13 July 2020); Lukša Jakobušić (from 30 October 2020)
- Manager: Igor Tudor (until 21 August 2020); Hari Vukas (8 September 2020 - 4 November 2020); Boro Primorac (4 November 2020 - 18 January 2021); Paolo Tramezzani (from 18 January 2021)
- Prva HNL: 4th
- Croatian Cup: Quarter-finals
- Europa League: Third qualifying round
- Top goalscorer: League: Mijo Caktaš (9); All: Mijo Caktaš (12)
- Highest home attendance: 4,517 (vs. Šibenik) (18 October 2020)
- Lowest home attendance: 3,340 (vs. Varaždin) (27 September 2020)
Home colours	Away colours	Third colours

The 2020–21 season was the 110th season in Hajduk Split’s history and their thirtieth in the Prva HNL.

== First-team squad ==
For details of former players, see List of HNK Hajduk Split players.

As of 22 May 2021

Note: Flags indicate national team as defined under FIFA eligibility rules; some limited exceptions apply. Players may hold more than one non-FIFA nationality.

No.	Pos.	Nation	Player
4	MF	ITA	Marco Fossati (on loan from Monza)
5	DF	BUL	Kristian Dimitrov
6	MF	CRO	Darko Nejašmić
7	FW	SWE	Alexander Kačaniklić
8	DF	CZE	Stefan Simić
9	FW	CRO	Marin Jakoliš
10	MF	CRO	Mijo Caktaš
11	FW	CRO	Marko Livaja
14	FW	GRE	Dimitrios Diamantakos
17	FW	TUR	Umut Nayir (on loan from Beşiktaş)
18	DF	BIH	Nihad Mujakić (on loan from Kortrijk)
19	MF	CRO	Mario Čuić
20	MF	MKD	Jani Atanasov
21	FW	BRA	Jairo

No.	Pos.	Nation	Player
23	MF	CRO	Ivan Brnić
24	MF	CRO	Stanko Jurić
27	FW	CRO	Stipe Biuk
29	DF	CRO	Božo Mikulić
30	GK	CRO	Karlo Sentić
31	DF	CRO	Ivan Dolček
35	DF	CRO	David Čolina
44	DF	CRO	Mario Vušković
55	DF	BIH	Darko Todorović (on loan from RB Salzburg)
70	GK	CRO	Josip Posavec
90	FW	CRO	Marin Ljubičić
91	GK	CRO	Lovre Kalinić (Captain; on loan from Aston Villa)
99	MF	CRO	Tonio Teklić

== Competitions ==
=== Overview ===
Competition	First match	Last match	Starting round	Final position	Record							
Competition	First match	Last match	Starting round	Final position	Pld	W	D	L	GF	GA	GD	Win %
HT Prva liga	16 August 2020	22 May 2021	Matchday 1	4th	36	18	6	12	48	37	+11	50.00
Croatian Cup	6 October 2020	16 March 2021	First Round	Quarter-finals	3	2	0	1	5	4	+1	66.67
Europa League	17 September 2020	24 September 2020	Second qualifying round	Third qualifying round	2	1	0	1	1	2	−1	50.00
Total					41	21	6	14	54	43	+11	51.22

Source: Soccerway

=== HT Prva liga ===
==== Classification ====
Pos	Team	Pld	W	D	L	GF	GA	GD	Pts	Qualification or relegation
2	Osijek	36	23	8	5	59	25	+34	77	Qualification for the Europa Conference League second qualifying round
3	Rijeka	36	18	7	11	51	46	+5	61	Qualification for the Europa Conference League second qualifying round
4	Hajduk Split	36	18	6	12	48	37	+11	60	Qualification for the Europa Conference League second qualifying round
5	Gorica	36	17	8	11	60	47	+13	59	
6	Šibenik	36	9	8	19	32	47	−15	35	

Source: PrvaHNL.hr
Rules for classification: 1) Points; 2) Head-to-head points; 3) Head-to-head goal difference; 4) Head-to-head goals scored (at home if two teams tied); 5) Goal difference; 6) Goals scored; 7) Play-off
(Note: Criteria 2-4 and 7 is only used if deciding champion, teams to international competition or teams for relegation and in that case criteria 6 will not be used).

==== Results summary ====
Overall								Home						Away					
Pld	W	D	L	GF	GA	GD	Pts	W	D	L	GF	GA	GD	W	D	L	GF	GA	GD
36	18	6	12	48	37	+11	60	8	4	6	27	19	+8	10	2	6	21	18	+3

Source: Prva HNL

==== Results by round ====
Round	1	2	3	4	5	6	7	8	9	10	11	12	13	14	15	16	17	18	19	20	21	22	23	24	25	26	27	28	29	30	31	32	33	34	35	36
Ground	H	A	H	H	A	H	A	H	A	A	H	A	A	H	A	H	A	H	H	A	H	H	A	H	A	H	A	A	H	A	A	H	A	H	A	H
Result	W	W	D	L	W	W	L	L	W	L	D	W	L	L	L	L	W	L	W	L	D	D	W	W	D	W	W	W	L	D	L	W	W	W	W	W
Position	3	3	3	3	3	3	3	5	4	4	5	5	5	5	5	5	5	5	5	5	5	5	5	5	5	5	5	5	5	5	5	5	5	5	5	4

Source: Prva HNL
A = Away; H = Home; W = Win; D = Draw; L = Loss

==== Results by opponent ====
Team	Results				Points
Team	1	2	3	4	Points
Dinamo Zagreb	1–2	1–3	1–1	0–2	1
Gorica	1–2	2–4	1–1	4–0	4
Istra 1961	2–0	0–1	1–0	1–0	9
Lokomotiva	2–1	0–1	2–0	2–0	9
Osijek	2–1	1–1	0–2	0–1	4
Rijeka	1–0	1–2	1–0	3–2	9
Slaven Belupo	2–2	2–0	2–2	1–1	6
Šibenik	0–1	1–0	1–0	2–0	9
Varaždin	2–0	2–4	2–0	1–0	9

Source: 2020–21 Croatian First Football League article

== Matches ==
=== Friendlies ===
==== Mid-season ====
12 January 2021 Friendly	Hajduk Split	3–2	Solin	Postira, Croatia
17:45	Vulikić 17' (o.g.); Gyurcsó 42' (pen.); Atanasov 69'	Report	Pekić 59'; Ninčević 89' (pen.)	Stadium: Podježice; Referee: Duje Strukan (Split)

16 January 2021 Friendly	Hajduk Split	1–1	Croatia Zmijavci	Split, Croatia
14:00	Diamantakos 54' (pen.)	Report	Mrkonjić 17'	Stadium: Stadion Poljud; Referee: Marino Majstrović (Split)

=== HT Prva liga ===
16 August 2020 1	Hajduk Split	2–0	Istra 1961	Split
17:55 CEST (UTC+02:00)	Čuić (yellow card) 53'; Dimitrov 72'; Gyurcsó 83'; Caktaš (yellow card) 90+4'	Report	Blagojević (yellow card) 34'	Stadium: Stadion Poljud; Attendance: 0 Referee: Mario Zebec (Cestica)

23 August 2020 2	Osijek	1–2	Hajduk Split	Osijek
17:55 CEST (UTC+02:00)	Beljo (yellow card) 20'; Jugović 43'; Špoljarić (yellow card) 87'	Report	Jairo 34' (yellow card) 67'; Caktaš 36' (pen.); Posavec (yellow card) 56'; Jurić (yellow card) 88'	Stadium: Stadion Gradski vrt Attendance: 0 Referee: Mario Zebec (Cestica)

29 August 2020 3	Hajduk Split	2–2	Slaven Belupo	Split
20:05 CEST (UTC+02:00)	Jairo (yellow card) 5' (yellow-red card) 86'; Vušković (yellow card) 45'; Diamantakos 52'; Gyurcsó 65'	Report	Krstanović 38' (pen.) (yellow card) 79'; Lulić (yellow card) 63'; Bačelić-Grgić 71'	Stadium: Stadion Poljud; Attendance: 0 Referee: Damir Batinić (Osijek)

12 September 2020 4	Hajduk Split	1–2	Dinamo Zagreb	Split
19:00 CEST (UTC+02:00)	Jurić 88'	Report	Stojanović (yellow card) 40'; Kastrati 42'; Oršić 50'	Stadium: Stadion Poljud; Attendance: 0 Referee: Ivan Bebek (Rijeka)

27 September 2020 6	Hajduk Split	2–0	Varaždin	Split
19:05 CEST (UTC+02:00)	Gyurcsó 5'; Jurić (yellow card) 37'; Caktaš 50' (pen.); Dimitrov (yellow card) 90'; Teklić (yellow card) 90+2'	Report	Pëllumbi (yellow card) 9' (red card) 15'; Zelenika (yellow card) 49'; Urata (yellow card) 69'; Mehdikhani (yellow card) 85'; Skorup (yellow card) 90'	Stadium: Stadion Poljud; Attendance: 3,340; Referee: Fran Jović (Zagreb)

3 October 2020 7	Gorica	2–1	Hajduk Split	Velika Gorica
19:05 CEST (UTC+02:00)	Babec (yellow card) 37'; Lovrić 62' (pen.); Hamad 78'	Report	Caktaš (yellow card) 29' (goal) 45' (pen.); Čolina (yellow card) 48' (yellow-red card) 70'; Jurić (yellow card) 51'; Jairo (penalty missed) 90+10'	Stadium: Stadion Radnik; Attendance: 1,523; Referee: Damir Batinić (Osijek)

18 October 2020 8	Hajduk Split	0–1	Šibenik	Split
15:00 CEST (UTC+02:00)		Report	E. Sahiti 34'; Bulat (yellow card) 84'	Stadium: Stadion Poljud; Attendance: 4,517; Referee: Mario Zebec (Cestica)

31 October 2020 10	Istra 1961	1–0	Hajduk Split	Pula
17:05 CEST (UTC+02:00)	Sergi (yellow card) 44'; Halilović (yellow card) 56'; Galilea (yellow card) 75'; Vuk 86'	Report	Jradi (yellow card) 35'; Caktaš (penalty missed) 76'; Caktaš (yellow card) 90+6'	Stadium: Stadion Aldo Drosina; Attendance: 0 Referee: Tihomir Pejin (Donji Miholjac)

7 November 2020 11	Hajduk Split	1–1	Osijek	Split
17:00 CET (UTC+01:00)	Vušković (yellow card) 47'; Čolina 55'; Jradi (penalty missed) 90+6'	Report	Miérez 23'; Lyopa (yellow card) 50'; Ivušić (yellow card) 90+6'	Stadium: Stadion Poljud; Attendance: 0 Referee: Fran Jović (Zagreb)

21 November 2020 12	Slaven Belupo	0–2	Hajduk Split	Koprivnica
17:05 CET (UTC+01:00)	Paracki (yellow card) 54'; Boakye (yellow card) 90+8'	Report	Nayir 45+2'; Soldo 56' (o.g.); Simić (yellow card) 82'; Vušković (yellow card) 83'	Stadium: Gradski Stadion Ivan Kušek Apaš; Attendance: 0 Referee: Ivan Bebek (Rijeka)

24 November 2020 9	Lokomotiva	1–2	Hajduk Split	Zagreb
17:00 CET (UTC+01:00)	Petrak (yellow card) 34'; Tuci 56'; Kolinger (yellow card) 50'; Đira (yellow card) 82'	Report	Caktaš 12' 90'; Simić (yellow card) 24'	Stadium: Stadion Kranjčevićeva; Attendance: 0 Referee: Marin Vidulin (Kanfanar)

6 December 2020 14	Hajduk Split	1–2	Rijeka	Split
17:05 CET (UTC+01:00)	Caktaš 10' (pen.) (yellow card) 61'; Simić (yellow card) 48'; Dolček (yellow card) 85'	Report	Lončar 40'; Menalo 70'; Nevistić (yellow card) 90+1'	Stadium: Stadion Poljud; Attendance: 0 Referee: Damir Batinić (Osijek)

12 December 2020 15	Varaždin	4–2	Hajduk Split	Varaždin
17:05 CET (UTC+01:00)	Posavec 4'; Grgec 32'; Daničić (yellow card) 56'; Senić 58' (yellow card) 68'; Benko (yellow card) 73'; Horkaš (yellow card) 87'; Obregón 90+5'	Report	Dimitrov (yellow card) 44'; Caktaš 72' 78'; Jradi (yellow card) 81'	Stadium: Stadion Varteks; Attendance: 0 Referee: Ante Čuljak (Zagreb)

20 December 2020 16	Hajduk Split	2–4	Gorica	Split
17:05 CET (UTC+01:00)	Atanasov 24'; Diamantakos 63'; Dimitrov (yellow card) 79'	Report	Dieye 6'; Lovrić 54' (pen.) 76' (pen.); Moro 89'	Stadium: Stadion Poljud; Attendance: 0 Referee: Ivan Bebek (Rijeka)

22 January 2021 17	Šibenik	0–1	Hajduk Split	Šibenik
18:05 CET (UTC+01:00)	Alimi (yellow card) 90+3'	Report	Todorović (yellow card) 23'; Teklić (yellow card) 25' (goal) 62'; Caktaš (penalty missed) 90+3'	Stadium: Stadion Šubićevac; Attendance: 0 Referee: Damir Batinić (Osijek)

27 January 2021 13	Dinamo Zagreb	3–1	Hajduk Split	Zagreb
17:05 CET (UTC+01:00)	Oršić 16' 18'; Franjić (yellow card) 48'; Perić (yellow card) 78'; Majer 83'; Lauritsen (yellow card) 87'	Report	Vušković 6'; Jradi (yellow card) 24'; Jakoliš (yellow card) 49'; Jurić (yellow card) 75'	Stadium: Stadion Maksimir; Attendance: 0 Referee: Mario Zebec (Cestica)

30 January 2021 18	Hajduk Split	0–1	Lokomotiva	Split
19:10 CET (UTC+01:00)	Teklić (yellow card) 43'; Caktaš (penalty missed) 50'	Report	Petrak 4'; Cipetić (yellow card) 40'; Jelavić (yellow card) 48'; Šimić (yellow card) 77'; Marić (yellow card) 87'	Stadium: Stadion Poljud; Attendance: 0 Referee: Tihomir Pejin (Donji Miholjac)

3 February 2021 19	Hajduk Split	1–0	Istra 1961	Split
19:10 CET (UTC+01:00)	Nayir 16' (penalty missed) 26' (yellow card) 66'; Atanasov (yellow card) 45+1'	Report	Vojković (yellow card) 7'; Tomašević (yellow card) 25'	Stadium: Stadion Poljud; Attendance: 0 Referee: Zdenko Lovrić (Đakovo)

6 February 2021 20	Osijek	2–0	Hajduk Split	Osijek
15:00 CET (UTC+01:00)	Igor Silva (yellow card) 36'; Kleinheisler 59'; Miérez (yellow card) 75' (goal) 89'; Lončar (yellow card) 85'	Report	Simić (yellow card) 11'; Mujakić (yellow card) 44' (yellow-red card) 51'; Dimitrov (yellow card) 82'	Stadium: Stadion Gradski vrt Attendance: 0 Referee: Ivan Bebek (Rijeka)

10 February 2021 5	Rijeka	0–1	Hajduk Split	Rijeka
18:05 CET (UTC+01:00)	Kulenović (yellow card) 59'; Vukčević (yellow card) 77'	Report	Vušković (yellow card) 86'; Caktaš 90+4'	Stadium: Stadion Rujevica; Attendance: 0 Referee: Dario Bel (Osijek)

27 February 2021 23	Rijeka	0–1	Hajduk Split	Rijeka
17:30 CET (UTC+01:00)	Yatéké (yellow card) 11'; Andrijašević (penalty missed) 90+6'	Report	Nayir 72'	Stadium: Stadion Rujevica; Attendance: 0 Referee: Damir Batinić (Osijek)

6 March 2021 24	Hajduk Split	2–0	Varaždin	Split
17:05 CET (UTC+1)	Čolina 8'; Memija 45+1' (o.g.); Livaja (yellow card) 45+3'; Jurić (yellow card) 50'; Fossati (yellow card) 74' (yellow-red card) 88'	Report	Pëllumbi (yellow card) 20'; Senić (yellow card) 42'; Guera Djou (yellow card) 86' (yellow-red card) 90+1'; Benko (yellow card) 89'	Stadium: Stadion Poljud; Attendance: 0 Referee: Igor Pajač (Sveti Ivan Zelina)

13 March 2021 25	Gorica	1–1	Hajduk Split	Velika Gorica
17:05 CET (UTC+1)	Mujakić 6' (o.g.)	Report	Simić (yellow card) 36'; Atanasov 45'	Stadium: Stadion Radnik; Attendance: 0 Referee: Fran Jović (Zagreb)

20 March 2021 26	Hajduk Split	1–0	Šibenik	Split
17:05 CET (UTC+1)	Ljubičić 72'; Vušković (yellow card) 84'	Report	Bilić (yellow card) 39'; Jurić (yellow card) 50'; Alimi (yellow card) 75' (yellow-red card) 77'; S. Sahiti (yellow card) 81'	Stadium: Stadion Poljud; Attendance: 0 Referee: Ante Čuljak (Zagreb)

3 April 2021 27	Lokomotiva	0–2	Hajduk Split	Zagreb
12:55 CEST (UTC+02:00)	Čeliković (yellow card) 33'; Cipetić (yellow card) 47'; Musa (yellow card) 86'; Petrak (yellow card) 90+3'	Report	Livaja 15' (yellow card) 51'; Nayir 48'; Jurić (yellow card) 86'; Ljubičić (yellow card) 90+2'	Stadium: Stadion Kranjčevićeva; Attendance: 0 Referee: Ivan Bebek (Rijeka)

7 April 2021 21	Hajduk Split	2–2	Slaven Belupo	Split
18:00 CEST (UTC+02:00)	Fossati (yellow card) 26'; Mujakić (red card) 41'; Nayir 22' 90+3'	Report	Božić (yellow card) 34'; Lulić (yellow card) 41'; Goda (yellow card) 44'; Krstanović 65' (yellow card) 65' (goal) 69'; Julardžija (yellow card) 73'; Bosec (yellow card) 78'	Stadium: Stadion Poljud; Attendance: 0 Referee: Goran Pečarić (Zagreb)

11 April 2021 28	Istra 1961	0–1	Hajduk Split	Pula
17:05 CEST (UTC+02:00)	Sergi (yellow card) 6'; Blagojević (yellow card) 25' (yellow-red card) 88'; Halilović (yellow card) 33'; Navarro (yellow card) 45+2'; Bandé (yellow card) 53'; Gržan (yellow card) 86'	Report	Nayir (yellow card) 52'; Simić 68'; Kalinić (yellow card) 90+4'	Stadium: Stadion Aldo Drosina; Attendance: 0 Referee: Marko Matoc (Zaprešić)

16 April 2021 29	Hajduk Split	0–1	Osijek	Split
20:30 CEST (UTC+02:00)	Vušković (yellow card) 31'; Todorović (yellow card) 45'; Simić (yellow card) 78'; Fossati (yellow card) 83' (yellow-red card) 85'; Diamantakos (yellow card) 90+3'	Report	Jugović (yellow card) 39'; Miérez 48'; Kleinheisler (yellow card) 53'; Lončar (yellow card) 83'; Bočkaj (yellow card) 90+6'	Stadium: Stadion Poljud; Attendance: 0 Referee: Ivan Bebek (Rijeka)

20 April 2021 30	Slaven Belupo	1–1	Hajduk Split	Koprivnica
19:05 CEST (UTC+02:00)	Goda (yellow card) 53'; Krstanović 66'; Mlinar (yellow card) 88'	Report	Dimitrov 10'; Livaja (yellow card) 49'; Todorović (red card) 60'; Mujakić (yellow card) 90+4'	Stadium: Gradski Stadion Ivan Kušek Apaš; Attendance: 0 Referee: Damir Batinić (Osijek)

25 April 2021 31	Dinamo Zagreb	2–0	Hajduk Split	Zagreb
20:00 CEST (UTC+2)	Petković 21' (pen.) (yellow card) 71'; Kastrati 35'; Franjić (yellow card) 39'	Report	Simić (yellow card) 45'; Jurić (yellow card) 90+3'	Stadium: Stadion Maksimir; Attendance: 0 Referee: Ivan Bebek (Rijeka)

1 May 2021 32	Hajduk Split	3–2	Rijeka	Split
20:00 CEST (UTC+2)	Biuk 14'; Štefulj (yellow card) 30' 45' (o.g.); Kačaniklić 47'; Livaja (yellow card) 84'; Jurić (yellow card) 89'	Report	Drmić 31'; Andrijašević 65'	Stadium: Stadion Poljud; Attendance: 0 Referee: Marko Matoc (Zaprešić)

5 May 2021 22	Hajduk Split	1–1	Dinamo Zagreb	Split
18:00 CEST (UTC+2)	Livaja 44'; Simić (yellow card) 59'; Fossati (yellow card) 69'	Report	Majer 16'; Jakić (yellow card) 24'; Lauritsen (yellow card) 65'	Stadium: Stadion Poljud; Attendance: 0 Referee: Igor Pajač (Sveti Ivan Zelina)

9 May 2021 33	Varaždin	0–1	Hajduk Split	Varaždin
17:00 CEST (UTC+2)	Senić (yellow card) 53'; Posavec (yellow card) 56'; Postonjski (yellow card) 75'; Horkaš (yellow card) 89'	Report	Simić (yellow card) 68'; Livaja 89' (pen.); Jairo (yellow card) 90+1'; Kalinić (yellow card) 90+4'	Stadium: Stadion Varteks; Attendance: 0 Referee: Zdenko Lovrić (Đakovo)

12 May 2021 34	Hajduk Split	4–0	Gorica	Split
20:10 CEST (UTC+2)	Vušković 14'; Kačaniklić 16'; Livaja 23' (pen.); Biuk 39'	Report	Muhammed (yellow card) 33'; Krizmanić (yellow card) 41'	Stadium: Stadion Poljud; Attendance: 0 Referee: Tihomir Pejin (Donji Miholjac)

16 May 2021 35	Šibenik	0–2	Hajduk Split	Šibenik
17:05 CEST (UTC+2)	Schildenfeld (yellow card) 65'; Alimi (yellow card) 82'	Report	Fossati (yellow card) 27'; Todorović (yellow card) 46'; Livaja 58'; Jakoliš 70'	Stadium: Stadion Šubićevac; Attendance: 0 Referee: Ivan Vučković (Zagreb)

22 May 2021 36	Hajduk Split	2–0	Lokomotiva	Split
17:00 CEST (UTC+2)	Livaja 29'; Atanasov (yellow card) 32'; Biuk 82'	Report	Cipetić (yellow card) 44'; Kačavenda (yellow card) 56'; Papadopoulos (yellow card) 58'	Stadium: Stadion Poljud; Attendance: 0 Referee: Damir Batinić (Osijek)

Source: Croatian Football Federation

=== Croatian Cup ===
6 October 2020 R1	Graničar Županja	1–2	Hajduk Split	Županja
15:00 CEST (UTC+02:00)	Lotar 38'	Report	Caktaš 27' 65'	Stadium: Županja; Attendance: 1,000; Referee: Ante Čuljak (Zagreb)

2 March 2021 R2	Zagreb	0–3	Hajduk Split	Zagreb
15:00 CET (UTC+01:00)	Čavala (yellow card) 12'; Strunje (yellow card) 17' (yellow-red card) 65'; Medić (yellow card) 34'	Report	Fossati (yellow card) 49'; Jairo 58' 71'; Livaja 66'; Simić (yellow card) 77'	Stadium: Veslačka; Attendance: 0 Referee: Marko Matoc (Zaprešić)

16 March 2021 QF	Gorica	3–0	Hajduk Split	Velika Gorica
18:00 CET (UTC+01:00)	Kalik (yellow card) 7'; Lovrić 10' 82'; Steenvoorden (yellow card) 59'; Nimely 87'	Report	Simić (yellow card) 21'	Stadium: Stadion Radnik; Attendance: 0 Referee: Dario Bel (Osijek)

Source: Croatian Football Federation

=== UEFA Europa League ===
17 September 2020 2QR	Renova (North Macedonia)	0–1	(Croatia) Hajduk Split	Skopje, North Macedonia
15:30 CEST (UTC+2)	Gafuri (yellow card) 45+2'; Abdulla (yellow card) 66'; Gavazaj (yellow card) 90+2'; Mishkovski (yellow card) 90+3'	Report	Caktaš 4'; Jairo (yellow card) 7'; Vušković (yellow card) 42'; Mujakić (yellow card) 64'; Todorović (yellow card) 70'; Diamantakos (yellow card) 90+3'	Stadium: Petar Miloševski Training Centre (Note: Renova played their home match against Hajduk Split at Petar Miloševski Training Centre, Skopje, instead of their regular stadium Ecolog Arena, Tetovo.); Attendance: 0 Referee: João Pinheiro (Portugal)

24 September 2020 3QR	Galatasaray (Turkey)	2–0	(Croatia) Hajduk Split	Istanbul, Turkey
20:00 CEST (UTC+2)	Bayram (yellow card) 37'; Belhanda 77'; Babel 86'	Report	Mujakić (yellow card) 25'; Diamantakos (yellow card) 70'	Stadium: Türk Telekom Stadium; Attendance: 0 Referee: Craig Pawson (England)

Source: uefa.com

== Player seasonal records ==
Updated 28 May 2021

=== Goals ===
Rank	Name	League	Europe	Cup	Total
1	(Croatia) Mijo Caktaš	9	1	2	12
2	(Croatia) Marko Livaja	6	–	1	7
3	(Turkey) Umut Nayir	6	–	–	6
4	(Croatia) Stipe Biuk	3	–	–	3
4	(Hungary) Ádám Gyurcsó	3	–	–	3
4	(Brazil) Jairo	1	–	2	3
7	(North Macedonia) Jani Atanasov	2	–	–	2
7	(Croatia) David Čolina	2	–	–	2
7	(Greece) Dimitrios Diamantakos	2	–	–	2
7	(Bulgaria) Kristian Dimitrov	2	–	–	2
7	(Sweden) Alexander Kačaniklić	2	–	–	2
7	(Croatia) Mario Vušković	2	–	–	2
13	(Croatia) Marin Jakoliš	1	–	–	1
13	(Croatia) Stanko Jurić	1	–	–	1
13	(Croatia) Marin Ljubičić	1	–	–	1
13	(Czech Republic) Stefan Simić	1	–	–	1
13	(Croatia) Tonio Teklić	1	–	–	1
Own goals		3	–	–	3
TOTALS		48	1	5	54

Source: Competitive matches

=== Clean sheets ===
Rank	Name	League	Europe	Cup	Total
1	(Croatia) Lovre Kalinić	11	–	–	11
2	(Croatia) Josip Posavec	4	1	1	6
TOTALS		15	1	1	17

Source: Competitive matches

=== Disciplinary record ===
Number	Position	Player	1. HNL			Europa League			Croatian Cup			Total		
Number	Position	Player	Yellow card	(yellow card) (yellow-red card)	Red card	Yellow card	(yellow card) (yellow-red card)	Red card	Yellow card	(yellow card) (yellow-red card)	Red card	Yellow card	(yellow card) (yellow-red card)	Red card
4	MF	(Italy) Marco Fossati	3	2	0	0	0	0	1	0	0	4	2	0
5	DF	(Bulgaria) Kristian Dimitrov	4	0	0	0	0	0	0	0	0	4	0	0
8	DF	(Czech Republic) Stefan Simić	9	0	0	0	0	0	2	0	0	11	0	0
9	FW	(Croatia) Marin Jakoliš	1	0	0	0	0	0	0	0	0	1	0	0
10	MF	(Croatia) Mijo Caktaš	4	0	0	0	0	0	0	0	0	4	0	0
11	FW	(Croatia) Marko Livaja	4	0	0	0	0	0	0	0	0	4	0	0
14	FW	(Greece) Dimitrios Diamantakos	1	0	0	2	0	0	0	0	0	3	0	0
17	FW	(Turkey) Umut Nayir	2	0	0	0	0	0	0	0	0	2	0	0
18	DF	(Bosnia and Herzegovina) Nihad Mujakić	1	1	1	2	0	0	0	0	0	3	1	1
19	MF	(Croatia) Mario Čuić	1	0	0	0	0	0	0	0	0	1	0	0
20	MF	(North Macedonia) Jani Atanasov	2	0	0	0	0	0	0	0	0	2	0	0
21	FW	(Brazil) Jairo	2	1	0	1	0	0	0	0	0	3	1	0
24	MF	(Croatia) Stanko Jurić	8	0	0	0	0	0	0	0	0	8	0	0
31	DF	(Croatia) Ivan Dolček	1	0	0	0	0	0	0	0	0	1	0	0
35	DF	(Croatia) David Čolina	0	1	0	0	0	0	0	0	0	0	1	0
44	DF	(Croatia) Mario Vušković	6	0	0	1	0	0	0	0	0	7	0	0
55	DF	(Bosnia and Herzegovina) Darko Todorović	3	0	1	1	0	0	0	0	0	4	0	1
70	GK	(Croatia) Josip Posavec	1	0	0	0	0	0	0	0	0	1	0	0
90	FW	(Croatia) Marin Ljubičić	1	0	0	0	0	0	0	0	0	1	0	0
91	GK	(Croatia) Lovre Kalinić	2	0	0	0	0	0	0	0	0	2	0	0
93	MF	(Lebanon) Bassel Jradi	3	0	0	0	0	0	0	0	0	3	0	0
99	MF	(Croatia) Tonio Teklić	3	0	0	0	0	0	0	0	0	3	0	0
TOTALS			62	5	2	7	0	0	3	0	0	72	5	2

=== Appearances and goals ===
Number	Position	Player	Apps	Goals	Apps	Goals	Apps	Goals	Apps	Goals
Number	Position	Player	Total		1. HNL (Note: First number represents appearances in starting eleven, while the second number indicates a substitute appearance.)		Europa League		Croatian Cup	
1	GK	(Croatia) Marin Ljubić	2	0	1+0	0	0+0	0	1+0	0
4	MF	(Italy) Marco Fossati	15	0	13+0	0	0+0	0	1+1	0
5	DF	(Bulgaria) Kristian Dimitrov	21	2	16+4	2	0+0	0	1+0	0
6	MF	(Croatia) Darko Nejašmić	19	0	8+9	0	1+1	0	0+0	0
7	FW	(Sweden) Alexander Kačaniklić	15	2	12+2	2	0+0	0	1+0	0
7	FW	(Croatia) Leon Kreković	5	0	0+3	0	0+1	0	0+1	0
8	DF	(Czech Republic) Stefan Simić	27	1	24+0	1	0+0	0	3+0	0
9	FW	(Croatia) Marin Jakoliš	33	1	15+13	1	1+1	0	2+1	0
10	MF	(Croatia) Mijo Caktaš	20	12	16+1	9	2+0	1	1+0	2
11	FW	(Croatia) Marko Livaja	17	7	15+0	6	0+0	0	1+1	1
14	FW	(Greece) Dimitrios Diamantakos	22	2	9+10	2	2+0	0	1+0	0
15	DF	(Croatia) Stipe Radić	1	0	0+0	0	0+0	0	0+1	0
17	FW	(Turkey) Umut Nayir	26	6	20+5	6	0+0	0	1+0	0
18	DF	(Bosnia and Herzegovina) Nihad Mujakić	21	0	13+4	0	2+0	0	2+0	0
19	MF	(Croatia) Mario Čuić	9	0	4+3	0	0+0	0	2+0	0
20	MF	(North Macedonia) Jani Atanasov	26	2	11+12	2	0+2	0	1+0	0
21	FW	(Brazil) Jairo	29	3	17+7	1	2+0	0	2+1	2
22	FW	(Hungary) Ádám Gyurcsó	19	3	14+2	3	2+0	0	1+0	0
22	MF	(Croatia) Dino Skorup	1	0	1+0	0	0+0	0	0+0	0
23	FW	(Croatia) Ivan Brnić	5	0	2+3	0	0+0	0	0+0	0
24	MF	(Croatia) Stanko Jurić	37	1	32+1	1	2+0	0	1+1	0
26	DF	(Croatia) Branimir Barišić	1	0	0+1	0	0+0	0	0+0	0
27	FW	(Croatia) Stipe Biuk	11	3	8+1	3	0+0	0	0+2	0
28	DF	(Croatia) Vicko Ševelj	3	0	1+2	0	0+0	0	0+0	0
31	DF	(Croatia) Ivan Dolček	19	0	6+10	0	0+1	0	2+0	0
33	DF	(Croatia) Ante Bekavac	1	0	0+0	0	0+0	0	1+0	0
34	DF	(Albania) Ardian Ismajli	3	0	3+0	0	0+0	0	0+0	0
35	DF	(Croatia) David Čolina	32	2	29+0	2	2+0	0	1+0	0
44	DF	(Croatia) Mario Vušković	33	2	28+1	2	2+0	0	2+0	0
47	FW	(Albania) Francesco Tahiraj	1	0	0+1	0	0+0	0	0+0	0
55	DF	(Bosnia and Herzegovina) Darko Todorović	29	0	23+3	0	1+0	0	1+1	0
70	GK	(Croatia) Josip Posavec	17	0	14+0	0	2+0	0	1+0	0
90	FW	(Croatia) Marin Ljubičić	8	1	2+5	1	0+0	0	0+1	0
91	GK	(Croatia) Lovre Kalinić	22	0	21+0	0	0+0	0	1+0	0
93	MF	(Lebanon) Bassel Jradi	17	0	14+1	0	1+0	0	1+0	0
99	MF	(Croatia) Tonio Teklić	14	1	5+8	1	0+0	0	1+0	0

=== Overview of statistics ===
Statistic	Overall	1. HNL	Croatian Cup	Europa League
Most appearances	Jurić (37)	Jurić (33)	Jairo, Jakoliš & Simić (3)	12 players (2)
Most starts	Jurić (35)	Jurić (32)	Simić (3)	9 players (2)
Most substitute appearances	Jakoliš (15)	Jakoliš (13)	Biuk (2)	Atanasov (2)
Most minutes played	Jurić (3,058)	Jurić (2,791)	Simić (242)	6 players (180)
Top goalscorer	Caktaš (12)	Caktaš (9)	Caktaš & Jairo (2)	Caktaš (1)
Most assists	Livaja (7)	Livaja (6)	Diamantakos & Livaja (1)	Jairo (1)
Most yellow cards	Simić (11)	Simić (9)	Simić (2)	Diamantakos & Mujakić (2)
Most red cards	Fossati & Mujakić (2)	Fossati & Mujakić (2)	–	–
Last updated: 28 May 2021.

== Transfers ==
=== In ===
Date	Position	Player	From	Fee
10 August 2020	DF	(Croatia) Božo Mikulić	(Croatia) Slaven Belupo	Loan ended
10 August 2020	MF	(Croatia) Tonio Teklić	(Croatia) Varaždin	Loan ended
12 August 2020	FW	(Croatia) Michele Šego	(Croatia) Slaven Belupo	Loan ended
12 August 2020	FW	(Croatia) Ivan Delić	(Croatia) Istra 1961	Loan ended
11 August 2020	DF	(Bosnia and Herzegovina) Darko Todorović	(Austria) Red Bull Salzburg	Loan
8 September 2020	MF	(North Macedonia) Jani Atanasov	(Turkey) Bursaspor	Free
7 October 2020	FW	(Turkey) Umut Nayir	(Turkey) Beşiktaş	Loan
18 January 2021	GK	(Croatia) Lovre Kalinić	(England) Aston Villa	Loan
18 January 2021	MF	(Croatia) Dino Skorup	(Croatia) Varaždin	Loan ended
18 January 2021	FW	(Croatia) Ivan Delić	(Croatia) Varaždin	Loan ended
22 January 2021	MF	(Croatia) Jakov Blagaić	(Slovenia) Olimpija Ljubljana	Loan ended
1 February 2021	FW	(Croatia) Michele Šego	(Slovenia) Bravo	Loan ended
9 February 2021	MF	(Italy) Marco Fossati	(Italy) Monza	Loan
15 February 2021	FW	(Sweden) Alexander Kačaniklić	(Sweden) Hammarby	Undisclosed
17 February 2021	FW	(Croatia) Marko Livaja	(Greece) AEK Athens	Free
11 May 2021	FW	(Nigeria) Samuel Eduok	(Turkey) Konyaspor	Loan ended

Total Spending: ▼€0

=== Out ===
Date	Position	Player	To	Fee
29 July 2020	DF	(Croatia) Josip Juranović	(Poland) Legia Warsaw	€400,000
1 August 2020	MF	(The Gambia) Hamza Barry		End of contract
5 August 2020	FW	(Croatia) Michele Šego	(Slovenia) Bravo	Loan
7 August 2020	FW	(Albania) Emir Sahiti	(Croatia) Šibenik	Loan
11 August 2020	MF	(Croatia) Dino Skorup	(Croatia) Varaždin	Loan
11 August 2020	FW	(Croatia) Ivan Delić	(Croatia) Varaždin	Loan
20 August 2020	MF	(Croatia) Jakov Blagaić	(Slovenia) Olimpija Ljubljana	Loan
26 August 2020	FW	(Nigeria) Samuel Eduok	(Turkey) Konyaspor	Loan
8 September 2020	DF	(Kosovo) Lumbardh Dellova	(Kosovo) Prishtina	Loan
14 September 2020	DF	(Albania) Ardian Ismajli	(Italy) Spezia	€2,500,000
12 October 2020	MF	(Croatia) Jurica Pršir	(Croatia) Gorica	Free
16 October 2020	DF	(Albania) Francesco Tahiraj		Free (released)
21 January 2021	FW	(Croatia) Ivan Delić	(Croatia) Slaven Belupo	Undisclosed
1 February 2021	GK	(Croatia) Marin Ljubić	(Turkey) İstanbulspor	€200,000
1 February 2021	DF	(Croatia) Stipe Radić	(Belgium) Beerschot	€450,000
2 February 2021	FW	(Croatia) Michele Šego	(Croatia) Dugopolje	Loan
15 February 2021	FW	(Hungary) Ádám Gyurcsó	(Croatia) Osijek	Free
15 February 2021	FW	(Croatia) Leon Kreković	(Croatia) Dugopolje	Loan
21 May 2021	MF	(Lebanon) Bassel Jradi		Free (released)

Total Income: ▲€3,550,000

Total expenditure: ▲€3,550,000

=== Promoted from youth squad ===
Position	Player	Age
GK	(Croatia) Karlo Sentić	19
FW	(Croatia) Stipe Biuk	18
FW	(Croatia) Marin Ljubičić	19
