= Goran Blažević =

Croatian footballer

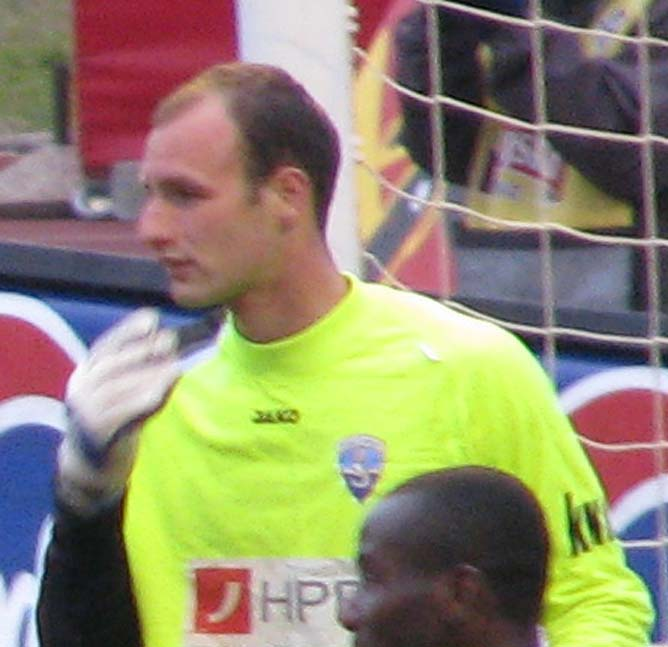
- Blažević with Šibenik in 2009

Personal information
- Date of birth: 7 June 1986 (age 40)
- Place of birth: Split, SFR Yugoslavia
- Height: 2.01 m (6 ft 7 in)
- Position: Goalkeeper

Team information
- Current team: Hajduk Split (youth gk coach)

Youth career
- 1998–2004: Hajduk Split

Senior career*
Years	Team	Apps	(Gls)
2004–2006	Hajduk Split	0	(0)
2004–2006	→ Trogir (loan)		
2007	Zagora Unešić		
2007–2008	Junak Sinj		
2008–2011	Šibenik	93	(0)
2012–2013	Hajduk Split	41	(0)
2013–2014	Levski Sofia	21	(0)
2014–2015	Torpedo Moscow	0	(0)
2016–2018	Slaven Belupo	26	(0)
2018–2020	Hajduk Split	5	(0)

International career^{‡}
2002	Croatia U16	4	(0)
2003	Croatia U17	1	(0)
- * Club domestic league appearances and goals as of 5 July 2020 ‡ National team caps and goals as of 5 July 2020

Goran Blažević (born 7 June 1986), nicknamed Šiljo, is a Croatian retired football goalkeeper.

== Club career ==
=== Early career ===
A product of the famous HNK Hajduk Split youth academy and one-time Croatian U16, U17 and U19 national team player, Goran began his senior career in 2004 on loan at HNK Trogir, then playing in the 1. Županijska liga Splitsko-dalmatinska. The club topped the table and moved to the 3. HNL – South and Goran played another season there. Dismissed from Hajduk as surplus, Goran played two more seasons in 3. HNL – South, first for NK Zagora Unešić and then NK Junak Sinj, where he was the star player in a season that resulted in their promotion to 2. HNL, catching the attention of some 1. HNL clubs.

=== HNK Šibenik ===
In 2008, Blažević moved to HNK Šibenik, quickly becoming a first team player (50 first team caps in his first two seasons at the club). With HNK Šibenik in financial difficulties, Blažević cancelled his contract with the club in December 2011.

=== Hajduk Split ===
In January 2012, Blažević signed a four-year contract with Hajduk Split. As Hajduk's former first choice goalkeeper Subašić had just left the club for French Ligue 2 side AS Monaco, Blažević immediately was bestowed the first choice at the historic club.

=== Levski Sofia ===
In September 2013 Blažević passed successfully his medical and signed a 2-year contract with Bulgarian side Levski Sofia. He quickly became first choice at the expense of Plamen Iliev, but gradually lost his starting spot following the appointment of Antoni Zdravkov.

=== Torpedo Moscow ===
In the summer of 2014, Blažević moved to the Russianside FC Torpedo Moscow, where he took on the role of backup to Yuri Zhevnov. He went on to play only one game for the club, in the Russian Cup, a 2–0 away loss to CSKA Moscow, before succumbing to an Achilles tendon injury requiring surgery at the start of 2015. Blažević was released by the club that summer.

=== Slaven Belupo ===
At the start of 2016, Blažević signed to Slaven Belupo in Croatia, playing only two matches before a shoulder injury forced him off the pitch until the end of the season. Returning in the summer of 2016. At the start of the season, Blažević, not fully healed, lost the starting place to Antun Marković, but after full recovery, took it over in September 2016. Marković would ultimately secure said position the following year, and Blažević would stay second-choice until his contract expired at the end of 2017.

=== Return to Hajduk Split ===
In September 2018, Blažević was signed by his former club HNK Hajduk Split, requiring a backup goalkeeper for Josip Posavec and Marin Ljubić, due to Tomislav Duka's injury. In October 2018, after Posavec was injured and Ljubić relegated to the reserve team, Blažević stepped in, featuring in 5 league matches and one cup match. Following Posavec and Duka's recovery in December 2018, Blažević was relegated again to a backup role, before he was released from the club after his second one-season contract expired at the end of June 2020.

After his retirement which came in the wake of leaving Hajduk, Blažević started working at the academy of Hajduk Split as a goalkeeper coach.

== International career ==
While in the HNK Hajduk Split academy, Blažević was capped four times for the Croatia U16 team, and once for the Croatia U17, as backup to Filip Lončarić.

In September 2009 he received his first call-up for Croatia, for friendly match vs. Liechtenstein. However, he was on the bench, while Danijel Subašić played the whole match.

In May 2010 he received his second call-up, for friendly matches against Austria, Wales, and Estonia, following the injury of Vedran Runje. Being the third choice, after Danijel Subašić and Stipe Pletikosa, he didn't get his cap that time.
