= Leon Kreković =

Croatian footballer

Personal information
- Date of birth: 7 May 2000 (age 26)
- Place of birth: Knin, Croatia
- Height: 1.82 m (6 ft 0 in)
- Position: Forward

Team information
- Current team: Kauno Žalgiris
- Number: 9

Youth career
- 2007–2012: Dinara Knin
- 2012–2018: Hajduk Split

Senior career*
Years	Team	Apps	(Gls)
2017–2020	Hajduk Split II	44	(6)
2019–2021	Hajduk Split	18	(1)
2021	→ Dugopolje (loan)	15	(1)
2021–2022	Beerschot	7	(0)
2022–2023	Šibenik	17	(0)
2023	Lahti	13	(2)
2024–2025	Kotwica Kołobrzeg	35	(1)
2025–2026	Posušje	27	(5)
2026–	Kauno Žalgiris	7	(5)

International career
2014	Croatia U14	4	(0)
2015–2016	Croatia U16	14	(6)
2016–2017	Croatia U17	8	(1)
2017	Croatia U18	4	(2)
2018–2019	Croatia U19	9	(2)
2019	Croatia U20	2	(2)
- * Club domestic league appearances and goals as of 17 September 2026

Leon Kreković (born 7 May 2000) is a Croatian professional footballer who plays as a forward for Toplyga club Kauno Žalgiris.

== Club career ==
Krekovic started his senior career with HNK Hajduk Split in the Croatian First Football League, where he has made 18 league appearances and scored one goal.

In July 2021, he signed a two-year contract with Beerschot in Belgium.

On 14 July 2023, Kreković signed with Finnish club Lahti for the rest of the 2023 season.

On 17 January 2024, Kreković joined Polish third-tier side Kotwica Kołobrzeg on a deal until mid-2025. On 22 June 2025, he was released along with the rest of the roster.

== International career ==
He represented Croatia at the 2017 UEFA European Under-17 Championship where Croatia was eliminated at group stage.

== Career statistics ==
As of match played 29 July 2026

Appearances and goals by club, season and competition
Club	Season	League			National cup (Note: Includes Croatian Cup, Belgian Cup, Polish Cup)		Europe		Other		Total	
Club	Season	Division	Apps	Goals	Apps	Goals	Apps	Goals	Apps	Goals	Apps	Goals
Hajduk Split II	2017–18	2. HNL	9	2	—		—		—		9	2
Hajduk Split II	2018–19	2. HNL	14	2	—		—		—		14	2
Hajduk Split II	2019–20	2. HNL	12	0	—		—		—		12	0
Hajduk Split II	2020–21	2. HNL	9	2	—		—		—		9	2
Hajduk Split II	Total		44	6	—		—		—		44	6
Hajduk Split	2019–20	1. HNL	15	1	0	0	—		—		15	1
Hajduk Split	2020–21	1. HNL	3	0	1	0	1 (Note: Appearance in UEFA Europa League)	0	—		5	0
Hajduk Split	Total		18	1	1	0	1	0	—		20	1
Dugopolje (loan)	2020–21	2. HNL	15	1	0	0	—		—		15	1
Beerschot	2021–22	Belgian Pro League	7	0	1	0	—		—		8	0
Šibenik	2022–23	Croatian Football League	17	0	2	0	—		—		19	0
Lahti	2023	Veikkausliiga	13	2	0	0	—		—		13	2
Kotwica Kołobrzeg	2023–24	II liga	11	0	—		—		—		11	0
Kotwica Kołobrzeg	2024–25	I liga	24	1	1	1	—		—		25	2
Kotwica Kołobrzeg	Total		35	1	1	1	—		—		36	2
Posušje	2025–26	Bosnian Premier League	27	5	0	0	—		—		27	5
Kauno Žalgiris	2026	TOPLYGA	1	0	0	0	2 (Note: Appearances in UEFA Champions League)	1	—		3	1
Career total			177	16	5	1	3	1	0	0	185	18

== Honours ==
Kauno Žalgiris

- Toplyga: 2026
- Lithuanian Cup: 2026
