= Darko Nejašmić =

Croatian footballer (born 1999)

Personal information
- Date of birth: 25 January 1999 (age 27)
- Place of birth: Split, Croatia
- Height: 1.85 m (6 ft 1 in)
- Position: Midfielder

Team information
- Current team: NEC
- Number: 6

Youth career
- –2015: Adriatic Split
- 2015–2017: Hajduk Split

Senior career*
Years	Team	Apps	(Gls)
2017–2022	Hajduk Split II	38	(3)
2018–2022	Hajduk Split	63	(3)
2021–2022	→ Osijek (loan)	27	(3)
2022–2024	Osijek	67	(4)
2024–2025	Sharjah	27	(1)
2025–	NEC	37	(5)

International career
2017	Croatia U19	4	(1)
2018	Croatia U20	4	(2)
2019–2020	Croatia U21	8	(2)
- * Club domestic league appearances and goals as of 25 October 2026

Darko Nejašmić (born 25 January 1999) is a Croatian professional footballer who plays as a midfielder for Eredivisie club NEC Nijmegen.

== Club career ==
Born in Split, Nejašmić represented the academy of local Adriatic Split as a youth, before moving on to the youth team of Hajduk Split. In 2017, he was promoted to the reserve team and played regularly during the season. On 20 September 2017, he made his first team debut, coming on as a substitute for Josip Radošević in a 3–0 victory over Oriolik in Croatian Cup.

On 18 June 2018, Nejašmić was promoted to the senior team and signed his first professional contract. He made his league debut on 1 December, playing the whole ninety minutes of a 4–1 victory over Rudeš.

On 6 May 2022, Osijek signed him permanently on a three-year contract.

On 6 September 2024, Nejašmić joined UAE Pro League club Sharjah on a two-year contract.

== International career ==
On 2 October 2018, Nejašmić was called to the under-21 national team for 2019 UEFA European Under-21 Championship qualification matches against Italy and San Marino.

Nejašmić's mother is from Bosnia and Herzegovina, so he is also eligible to play for the Bosnia and Herzegovina national football team.

== Career statistics ==
As of match played 25 October 2026

Club	Season	League			National cup (Note: Includes Croatian Football Cup)		League cup (Note: Includes UAE League Cup)		Continental		Total	
Club	Season	Division	Apps	Goals	Apps	Goals	Apps	Goals	Apps	Goals	Apps	Goals
Hajduk Split	2019–20	Prva HNL	0	0	1	0	—		—		1	0
Hajduk Split	2018–19	Prva HNL	21	1	2	0	—		—		23	1
Hajduk Split	2019–20	Prva HNL	25	2	0	0	—		1 (Note: Appearance(s) in UEFA Europa League)	0	26	2
Hajduk Split	2020–21	Prva HNL	17	0	0	0	—		2	0	19	0
Hajduk Split	Total		63	3	3	0	—		3	0	69	3
Osijek (loan)	2021–22	Prva HNL	27	3	2	0	—		3 (Note: Appearances in UEFA Europa Conference League)	0	32	3
Osijek	2022–23	Prva HNL	27	1	1	0	—		2	0	30	1
Osijek	2023–24	Prva HNL	36	3	3	0	—		4	1	43	4
Osijek	2024–25	Prva HNL	4	0	0	0	—		4	0	8	0
Osijek	Total		94	7	6	0	—		13	1	113	8
Sharjah FC	2024–25	UAE Pro League	14	0	2	0	5	0	6 (Note: Appearances in AFC Champions League Two)	1	27	1
NEC	2025–26	Eredivisie	29	4	3	0	—		—		32	4
NEC	2026–27	Eredivisie	8	1	0	0	—		7 (Note: Four appearances in UEFA Champions League, three appearances in UEFA Europa League)	0	15	1
NEC	Total		37	5	3	0	—		7	0	47	5
Career Total			208	15	14	0	5	0	29	2	256	17

== Honours ==
Sharjah

- AFC Champions League Two: 2024–25
