= David Čolina =

Croatian footballer

Personal information
- Date of birth: 19 July 2000 (age 26)
- Place of birth: Zagreb, Croatia
- Height: 1.74 m (5 ft 9 in)
- Position: Left-back

Team information
- Current team: Zagłębie Lubin
- Number: 6

Youth career
- 2008: Polet Buševec
- 2008–2009: Hrvatski Dragovoljac
- 2009–2018: Dinamo Zagreb
- 2018–2019: Monaco

Senior career*
Years	Team	Apps	(Gls)
2019–2023	Hajduk Split	96	(3)
2023	Augsburg II	2	(0)
2023–2026	Augsburg	7	(1)
2024	→ Vejle (loan)	12	(0)
2024–2025	→ Vejle (loan)	26	(0)
2025–2026	→ Osijek (loan)	29	(0)
2026–	Zagłębie Lubin	0	(0)

International career
2014	Croatia U14	4	(2)
2015	Croatia U15	5	(0)
2016	Croatia U16	3	(0)
2015–2017	Croatia U17	23	(1)
2017	Croatia U18	2	(0)
2017–2019	Croatia U19	16	(0)
2019	Croatia U20	1	(0)
2019–2023	Croatia U21	19	(0)
- * Club domestic league appearances and goals as of 15 June 2026

David Čolina (born 19 July 2000) is a Croatian professional footballer who plays as a left-back for Ekstraklasa club Zagłębie Lubin.

== Club career ==
Born in Zagreb, Čolina started training with Hrvatski Dragovoljac before moving to Dinamo Zagreb in 2008. In August 2018, he signed for Monaco.

=== Hajduk ===
On 22 July 2019, Čolina signed with Hajduk Split, on a four-year contract. On 28 July 2019, Čolina made his Hajduk debut, playing the full game as his side beat Varaždin 3–0 at Stadion Varteks in Round 2 of the 2019–20 Prva HNL.

=== Augsburg ===
On 14 January 2023, Čolina signed a contract with German club Augsburg until 30 June 2027.

He scored on his debut for the club with his first touch of the ball on 22 January 2023 in a match against Borussia Dortmund when he came on as a substitute.

On 24 January 2024, Čolina was loaned by Vejle in Denmark. After completing his loan spell, Čolina returned to Augsburg. On 20 July 2024, Čolina was back in Vejle on a new rental agreement, this time until the end of the season, with an option to buy included.

In July 2025, Čolina joined Croatian Football League club Osijek on a season-long loan with an option to buy.

=== Zagłębie Lubin ===
On 3 July 2026, Čolina joined Polish Ekstraklasa club Zagłębie Lubin on a two-year contract.

== Career statistics ==
As of match played 16 May 2026

Appearances and goals by club, season and competition
Club	Season	League			National cup (Note: Includes Croatian Cup, DFB-Pokal, Danish Cup)		Continental		Total	
Club	Season	Division	Apps	Goals	Apps	Goals	Apps	Goals	Apps	Goals
Hajduk Split	2019–20	Prva HNL	22	0	1	0	0	0	23	0
Hajduk Split	2020–21	Prva HNL	29	2	1	0	2 (Note: Appearances in the UEFA Europa League)	0	32	2
Hajduk Split	2021–22	Prva HNL	31	0	4	0	2 (Note: Appearances in the UEFA Europa Conference League)	0	37	0
Hajduk Split	2022–23	Prva HNL	14	1	0	0	3 (Note: Appearances in UEFA Europa Conference League)	0	17	1
Hajduk Split	Total		96	3	6	0	7	0	109	3
Augsburg	2022–23	Bundesliga	7	1	0	0	—		7	1
Augsburg	2023–24	Bundesliga	0	0	1	0	—		1	0
Augsburg	Total		7	1	1	0	—		8	1
Vejle (loan)	2023–24	Danish Superliga	12	0	—		—		12	0
Vejle (loan)	2024–25	Danish Superliga	26	0	1	0	—		27	0
Osijek (loan)	2025–26	Prva HNL	29	0	2	1	—		31	1
Zagłębie Lubin	2026–27	Ekstraklasa	0	0	0	0	—		0	0
Career total			170	4	10	1	7	0	187	5

== Honours ==
Hajduk Split

- Croatian Cup: 2021–22
