= Ivan Dolček =

Croatian footballer

Personal information
- Date of birth: 24 April 2000 (age 26)
- Place of birth: Koprivnica, Croatia
- Height: 1.81 m (5 ft 11 in)
- Position: Winger

Team information
- Current team: Dundee United (on loan from Dunajská Streda)
- Number: 19

Youth career
- 2006-2009: Drava Podravske Sesvete
- 2009-2011: Graničar Đurđevac
- 2011-2015: Dinamo Zagreb
- 2015: → Šibenik (loan)
- 2015-2019: Slaven Belupo

Senior career*
Years	Team	Apps	(Gls)
2017–2019	Slaven Belupo	13	(0)
2019–2023	Hajduk Split	56	(1)
2020	→ Hajduk Split II	2	(1)
2022	→ Famalicão (loan)	9	(1)
2022–2023	→ Šibenik (loan)	29	(5)
2024–2026	Dunajská Streda	6	(0)
2024–2025	→ Slaven Belupo (loan)	31	(3)
2025–2026	→ Dundee United (loan)	28	(5)
2026-	NK Osijek	0	(0)

International career
2018	Croatia U18	4	(1)
2017–2019	Croatia U19	10	(0)
2021	Croatia U20	2	(0)
2019–2022	Croatia U21	6	(0)
2022	Croatia U23	1	(0)
- * Club domestic league appearances and goals as of 20 May 2026

Ivan Dolček (born 24 April 2000) is a Croatian professional footballer who plays as a winger for NK Osijek

== Club career ==
Dolček started playing football at the local club in Podravske Sesvete, where he comes from. At the age of 9 he moved on to Graničar Đurđevac where he was noticed by GNK Dinamo Zagreb scouts, and he moved to their academy at the age of 11. He went on to stay for four years at the club, spending his last 6 months at the club on loan at HNK Šibenik. At the age of 15, he moved to Slaven Belupo's academy, where he would play for the U-17 and U-19 teams.

On 1 July 2019, Dolček moved from Slaven Belupo to Hajduk Split, signing a four-year contract with the club from Split.

On 9 July 2019, Dolček scored on his debut appearance for Hajduk Split. He came off the bench in a 2–0 win over Gżira United F.C. in the first qualifying round of the 2019–20 UEFA Europa League and scored in the 95th minute. Dolček got his first Prva HNL goal in his second league game for Hajduk, scoring the opener in a 3–0 win over NK Varaždin at Stadion Varteks.

In January 2024, Dolček joined Slovak First Football League club Dunajská Streda on a three-and-a-half-year contract.

== Career statistics ==
=== Club ===
As of 11 August 2023

Appearances and goals by club, season and competition
Club	Season	League			Cup		Continental		Other		Total	
Club	Season	Division	Apps	Goals	Apps	Goals	Apps	Goals	Apps	Goals	Apps	Goals
Slaven Belupo	2017–18	Prva HNL	3	0	—		—		—		3	0
Slaven Belupo	2018–19	Prva HNL	10	0	1	0	—		—		11	0
Slaven Belupo	Total		13	0	1	0	—		—		14	0
Hajduk Split	2019–20	Prva HNL	21	1	1	0	2	1	—		24	2
Hajduk Split	2020–21	Prva HNL	16	0	2	0	1	0	—		19	0
Hajduk Split	2021–22	Prva HNL	9	0	2	0	2	0	—		13	0
Hajduk Split	2023–24	Prva HNL	10	0	0	0	1	0	—		11	0
Hajduk Split	Total		56	1	5	0	6	1	—		67	2
Famalicão (loan)	2021–22	Primeira Liga	9	1	—		—		—		9	1
Šibenik (loan)	2022–23	Prva HNL	29	5	4	1	—		—		33	6
Career total			107	7	10	1	6	1	0	0	123	9
