= Mario Čuić =

Croatian footballer

Personal information
- Date of birth: 22 April 2001 (age 25)
- Place of birth: Split, Croatia
- Position: Midfielder

Team information
- Current team: Zrinjski Mostar
- Number: 10

Youth career
- –2015: Tomislav
- 2015–2020: Hajduk Split

Senior career*
Years	Team	Apps	(Gls)
2019–2021	Hajduk Split II	19	(3)
2020–2023	Hajduk Split	20	(2)
2022–2023	→ Radomlje (loan)	40	(3)
2023–2024	Istra 1961	37	(3)
2025	Varaždin	8	(0)
2025–2026	Posušje	32	(5)
2026–	Zrinjski Mostar	3	(0)

International career
2017–2019	Croatia U17	10	(1)
2019	Croatia U19	6	(1)
2023	Croatia U23	1	(0)
- * Club domestic league appearances and goals as of 19 September 2026

Mario Čuić (born 22 April 2001) is a Croatian professional footballer who plays as a midfielder for Bosnian Premier League club Zrinjski Mostar.

== Club career ==
Mario Čuić was born in Split, but raised in Donji Brišnik, a village in the municipality of Tomislavgrad, Bosnia and Herzegovina. He started his football career at local club Tomislav. He moved to neighbouring Croatia, joining the youth academy of famed Dalmatian club Hajduk Split in 2015. In late 2019, he signed a five-year contract with Hajduk.

Čuić made his debut for Hajduk on 11 June 2020, earning a place in the starting eleven and playing 66 minutes in a 1–0 win over Istra 1961. Aged 19, Čuić scored his first and second Hajduk goals in the Eternal derby in a 3–2 win over Dinamo Zagreb at Stadion Maksimir. The goals came in his sixth ever professional appearance.

== Career statistics ==
As of match played 19 September 2026

Appearances and goals by club, season and competition
Club	Season	League			National cup (Note: Includes Croatian Cup, Bosnian Cup)		Continental		Total	
Club	Season	Division	Apps	Goals	Apps	Goals	Apps	Goals	Apps	Goals
Hajduk Split II	2019–20	Croatian Second League	3	0	—		—		3	0
Hajduk Split II	2020–21	Croatian Second League	16	3	—		—		16	3
Hajduk Split II	Total		19	3	—		—		19	3
Hajduk Split	2019–20	Croatian First League	8	2	—		—		8	2
Hajduk Split	2020–21	Croatian First League	7	0	2	0	—		9	0
Hajduk Split	2021–22	Croatian First League	5	0	—		1 (Note: Appearance(s) in UEFA Europa Conference League)	0	6	0
Hajduk Split	Total		20	2	2	0	1	0	23	2
Radomlje (loan)	2021–22	Slovenian PrvaLiga	6	2	—		—		6	2
Radomlje (loan)	2022–23	Slovenian PrvaLiga	34	1	—		—		34	1
Radomlje (loan)	Total		40	3	—		—		40	3
Istra 1961	2023–24	Croatian First League	30	2	2	0	—		32	2
Istra 1961	2024–25	Croatian First League	7	1	1	1	—		8	2
Istra 1961	Total		37	3	3	1	—		40	4
Varaždin	2024–25	Croatian First League	8	0	—		—		8	0
Posušje	2025–26	Bosnian Premier League	32	5	1	0	—		33	5
Zrinjski Mostar	2026–27	Bosnian Premier League	3	0	0	0	2	0	5	0
Career total			159	16	6	1	3	0	168	17
