= Stipe Biuk =

Croatian footballer (born 2002)

Personal information
- Date of birth: 26 December 2002 (age 23)
- Place of birth: Split, Croatia
- Height: 1.84 m (6 ft 0 in)
- Position: Winger

Team information
- Current team: Widzew Łódź
- Number: 79

Youth career
- –2011: Solin
- 2011–2020: Hajduk Split

Senior career*
Years	Team	Apps	(Gls)
2020	Hajduk Split II	1	(0)
2021–2022	Hajduk Split	52	(5)
2023–2024	Los Angeles FC	30	(3)
2024	→ Valladolid (loan)	11	(0)
2024–2026	Valladolid	37	(1)
2024–2025	→ Hajduk Split (loan)	17	(2)
2026–	Widzew Łódź	0	(0)

International career
2016	Croatia U14	1	(0)
2018	Croatia U16	3	(0)
2018–2019	Croatia U17	10	(1)
2019	Croatia U18	2	(0)
2021–2024	Croatia U21	20	(2)
- * Club domestic league appearances and goals as of 9 June 2026

Stipe Biuk (Croatian pronunciation: [stǐːpe bîuːk]; born 26 December 2002) is a Croatian professional footballer who plays as a winger for Ekstraklasa club Widzew Łódź.

== Club career ==
=== Hajduk Split ===
Biuk came through the ranks of Solin, before joining the Hajduk Split in 2011. While in the Hajduk academy, he attracted attention from Bayern Munich and Red Bull Salzburg. On 16 January 2021, he signed a professional contract with Hajduk, tying him to the club until 2026. At the time of signing the contract, Biuk had offers from 1899 Hoffenheim, VfL Wolfsburg, Borussia Mönchengladbach, and Galatasaray.

Biuk made his debut for Hajduk on 2 March 2021, in a Croatian Cup 3–0 victory over Zagreb, being substituted on for Jairo in the 74th minute. He made his Prva HNL debut on the 20 March 2021, starting on the left wing in Hajduk's 1–0 derby win against Šibenik, due to absence of Alexander Kačaniklić, Dimitrios Diamantakos and Umut Nayir. After the match, coach Paolo Tramezzani gave Biuk no significant amount of playtime until the 2–0 derby defeat to Dinamo Zagreb on 25 April. Since then, Biuk became a regular for Hajduk, scoring three goals and delivering two assists by the end of the season. He scored his debut goal for Hajduk on 1 May, in a 3–2 derby victory over Rijeka. On 22 May, he scored in a crucial 2–0 victory over Lokomotiva Zagreb, securing a Europa Conference League qualifying spot for Hajduk.

After a rougher start of the 2021–22 season during the tenure of Jens Gustafsson, Biuk improved his form with the arrival of Valdas Dambrauskas.

=== Los Angeles FC ===
On 30 December 2022, Biuk signed a four-year contract with Major League Soccer side Los Angeles FC.

=== Valladolid ===
On 25 January 2024, Biuk was loaned to Segunda División side Real Valladolid, until the end of the season. On 8 July, after the club's promotion to La Liga, his buyout clause was activated, and he signed a permanent five-year deal with the Pucelanos.

==== Loan to Hajduk Split ====
Biuk made his return to Hajduk Split on a one-year loan move on 1 September 2024 from Valladolid. He was given the number 27 shirt again, which he had worn while playing for Hajduk Split two years prior.

=== Widzew Łódź ===
On 21 August 2026, Biuk moved on a free transfer to Ekstraklasa club Widzew Łódź, signing a contract until June 2029 with an option for another year.

== International career ==
Following his good club form in the 2020–21 season, on 17 May 2021, Biuk was included in Igor Bišćan's 23-man squad for 2021 UEFA Under-21 Euro knockout stage. He made his debut on 31 May in the 2–1 quarter-final defeat to Spain, coming on for Lovro Majer in the 78th minute. He won a penalty deep in injury time, which Luka Ivanušec successfully converted and took the game to extra time; however, Javi Puado's second goal knocked Croatia out of the tournament.

== Personal life ==
Stipe Biuk was born in Split and grew up in Solin. His father Robert Biuk is a retired policeman who hails from Vrlika. His mother Danijela Boduljak died on 28 December 2011 while making a birthday cake for Stipe, collapsing in the kitchen due to a ruptured aneurysm in her head. His brothers Filip and Duje are also football players, playing for Mosor and Krško 1922 respectively.

Biuk named Marco Reus his football role model. Apart from Hajduk Split, he is also a fan of Borussia Dortmund and Liverpool.

== Career statistics ==
As of match played 31 May 2026

Appearances and goals by club, season and competition
Club	Season	League			National cup (Note: Includes Croatian Cup, U.S. Open Cup)		Continental		Other		Total	
Club	Season	Division	Apps	Goals	Apps	Goals	Apps	Goals	Apps	Goals	Apps	Goals
Hajduk Split II	2020–21	Druga HNL	1	0	—		—		—		1	0
Hajduk Split	2020–21	Prva HNL	9	3	2	0	0	0	—		11	3
Hajduk Split	2021–22	Prva HNL	28	1	4	0	1 (Note: Appearances in UEFA Europa Conference League)	0	—		31	1
Hajduk Split	2022–23	Prva HNL	15	1	2	0	4	1	—		21	2
Hajduk Split	Total		52	5	8	0	5	1	—		42	4
LAFC	2023	MLS	30	3	1	0	8 (Note: Appearances in CONCACAF Champions League)	0	4 (Note: Three appearances in Leagues Cup, one appearance in Campeones Cup)	0	39	3
Valladolid (loan)	2023–24	Segunda División	11	0	—		—		—		11	0
Valladolid	2025–26	Segunda División	37	1	0	0	—		—		37	1
Valladolid	Total		48	1	0	0	—		—		48	1
Hajduk Split (loan)	2024–25	Prva HNL	17	2	2	0	0	0	—		19	2
Widzew Łódź	2026–27	Ekstraklasa	0	0	0	0	—		—		0	0
Career total			148	11	11	0	13	1	4	0	176	12

== Honours ==
Hajduk Split

- Croatian Cup: 2021–22
