= Niko Havelka =

Croatian footballer (born 1999)

Personal information
- Date of birth: 17 December 1999 (age 26)
- Place of birth: Varaždin, Croatia
- Height: 1.70 m (5 ft 7 in)
- Position: Central midfielder

Team information
- Current team: Omonia Aradippou
- Number: 8

Youth career
- –2018: Varaždin

Senior career*
Years	Team	Apps	(Gls)
2018–2020	Varaždin	10	(0)
2019	→ Podravina (loan)		
2020–2021	Slaven Belupo	4	(0)
2020–2021	→ Međimurje (loan)	30	(8)
2021–2022	Onisilos Sotira	15	(0)
2022–2023	Bistrica	30	(4)
2023–	Omonia Aradippou	82	(1)
- * Club domestic league appearances and goals as of 14 June 2026

Niko Havelka (born 17 December 1999) is a Croatian professional footballer who plays as a central midfielder for Omonia Aradippou.

== Club career ==
Havelka began his football career with local Varaždin making his senior debut for the side in May 2018, as a substitute in a 2–1 win over Hrvatski Dragovoljac in a Croatian Second Football League match. In August 2019, he joined Croatian Third Football League side Podravina on loan until the end of the year. After his return from loan, he joined Slaven Belupo on a permanent deal. On 28 February 2020, Havelka made his professional debut in the Croatian First Football League as a substitute against his former side Varaždin. In summer of 2020, he joined returned to the second division to join Međimurje on a season-long loan deal.
