= Tonio Teklić =

Croatian footballer (born 1999)

Personal information
- Date of birth: 9 September 1999 (age 27)
- Place of birth: Split, Croatia
- Height: 1.82 m (6 ft 0 in)
- Position: Attacking midfielder

Team information
- Current team: Mardin 1969 (on loan from Widzew Łódź)

Youth career
- 2008–2010: Solin
- 2010–2015: Adriatic Split
- 2015–2017: Hajduk Split

Senior career*
Years	Team	Apps	(Gls)
2016–2020	Hajduk Split B	50	(8)
2017–2022	Hajduk Split	32	(2)
2020	→ Varaždin (loan)	12	(0)
2021	→ Hrvatski Dragovoljac (loan)	4	(0)
2021–2022	→ Varaždin (loan)	26	(4)
2022–2023	Varaždin	33	(8)
2023–2025	Trabzonspor	5	(0)
2024	→ Fatih Karagümrük (loan)	8	(0)
2024–2025	→ Erzurumspor (loan)	33	(4)
2025–	Widzew Łódź	8	(0)
2025	Widzew Łódź II	1	(1)
2026	→ Osijek (loan)	13	(0)
2026–	→ Mardin 1969 (loan)	0	(0)

International career
2017	Croatia U18	2	(0)
2016–2017	Croatia U19	5	(1)
2018	Croatia U20	1	(0)
2022–2023	Croatia U23	2	(1)
- * Club domestic league appearances and goals as of 17:13, 29 May 2026 (UTC)

Tonio Teklić (Croatian pronunciation: [têklitɕ]; born 9 September 1999) is a Croatian professional footballer who plays as an attacking midfielder for TFF 1. Lig club Mardin 1969, on loan from Widzew Łódź.

== Club career ==
Teklić was born in Split to a family originally from Livno and living in the suburb Solin. He began his youth career at the local NK Solin and quickly moved to the new-founded Adriatic Split where he spent 5 years at the youth levels winning various tournaments and individual awards. In the summer of 2015, Teklić, alongside many of his Adriatic teammates signed youth contracts with Hajduk Split. He established himself throughout the Hajduk B squad and got called up for senior squad league match of Hajduk against Lokomotiva Zagreb, where he entered as a substitute in the 46th minute, replacing Savvas Gentsoglou.

Teklić became a permanent part of the first-team squad at the beginning of 2019.

On 21 July 2023, he signed a three-year contract with Süper Lig club Trabzonspor.

On 22 July 2025, Teklić joined Polish club Widzew Łódź on a free transfer, signing a four-year contract. On 3 January 2026, he returned to Croatia and joined Osijek on loan for the remainder of the season.

On 5 August 2026, he moved on loan to Turkish second division club Mardin 1969.
