= Francesco Tahiraj =

Albanian footballer (born 1996)

Personal information
- Date of birth: 21 September 1996 (age 30)
- Place of birth: Turin, Italy
- Height: 1.72 m (5 ft 8 in)
- Position: Winger

Team information
- Current team: Partizani B
- Number: 47

Youth career
- –2006: CBS Milan
- 2006–2014: Juventus
- 2013–2014: → Carpi (loan)
- 2014–2015: Torino
- 2015: → Carpi (loan)

Senior career*
Years	Team	Apps	(Gls)
2015–2016	Zavrč	20	(2)
2016–2019	Aluminij	72	(16)
2019–2020	Hajduk Split	22	(0)
2020–2022	Lokomotiva	10	(0)
2022–2024	Radomlje	19	(0)
2024–	Partizani B	1	(0)

International career
2012	Albania U17	1	(1)
2014	Albania U19	2	(1)
- * Club domestic league appearances and goals as of 24 August 2022

Francesco Tahiraj (Albanian: Françesko Tahiraj; born 21 September 1996) is an Albanian professional footballer who plays as a winger for Kategoria e Tretë club Partizani B.

== Club career ==
=== Early career ===
Tahiraj started his youth career at CBS Milan academy based in Turin, Italy. At the age of 11, the former Juventus player Gianluca Pessotto spotted him and Tahiraj had a successfully trial with Juventus academy and in summer of 2006 he moved to Juventus.

In August 2013 he was loaned out for a year to Carpi for primavera team. On 16 July 2014 Juventus sold him to city rivals FC Torino for a fee of €75,000. In January 2015 Torino loaned him to Carpi primavera for a half season.

=== Zavrč ===
After spending several years in Italy as a youth player, in August 2015 Tahiraj signed a professional contract with Slovenian side NK Zavrč.

Tahiraj made his professional debut in the Slovenian PrvaLiga on 21 August 2015, replacing Veljko Batrović in the 83rd minute in a championship game against Domžale, which finished as a goalless draw.

=== Hajduk Split ===
On 12 January 2019, Tahiraj signed for Hajduk Split on a contract lasting until the summer of 2022.

== International career ==
=== Albania U17 ===
Tahiraj was invited for the first time to the Albanian under-17 team by the coach Džemal Mustedanagić to participate in the 2013 UEFA European Under-21 Championship qualifiers in October 2012. In the first two games of the qualification tournament he was an unused substitute. Tahiraj made his debut for the U17s side against Liechtenstein U17 on 23 October 2012, playing as a starter and also scoring a goal in the 39th minute in a 6–0 victory.

=== Albania U19 ===
Tahiraj was called up to the Albanian under-19 team by the coach Altin Lala for the friendly match against Italy on 17 December 2014.

== Career statistics ==
=== Club ===
As of 20 July 2016

Appearances and goals by club, season and competition
Season	Club	Division	League		National cup		Continental		Total	
Season	Club	Division	Apps	Goals	Apps	Goals	Apps	Goals	Apps	Goals
2015–16	Zavrč	Slovenian PrvaLiga	20	2	3	0	—		23	2
Total			20	2	3	0	0	0	23	2
Career total			20	2	3	0	0	0	23	2

== Honours ==
Aluminij

- Slovenian Cup runner-up: 2017–18
