= Ivan Brnić =

Croatian footballer

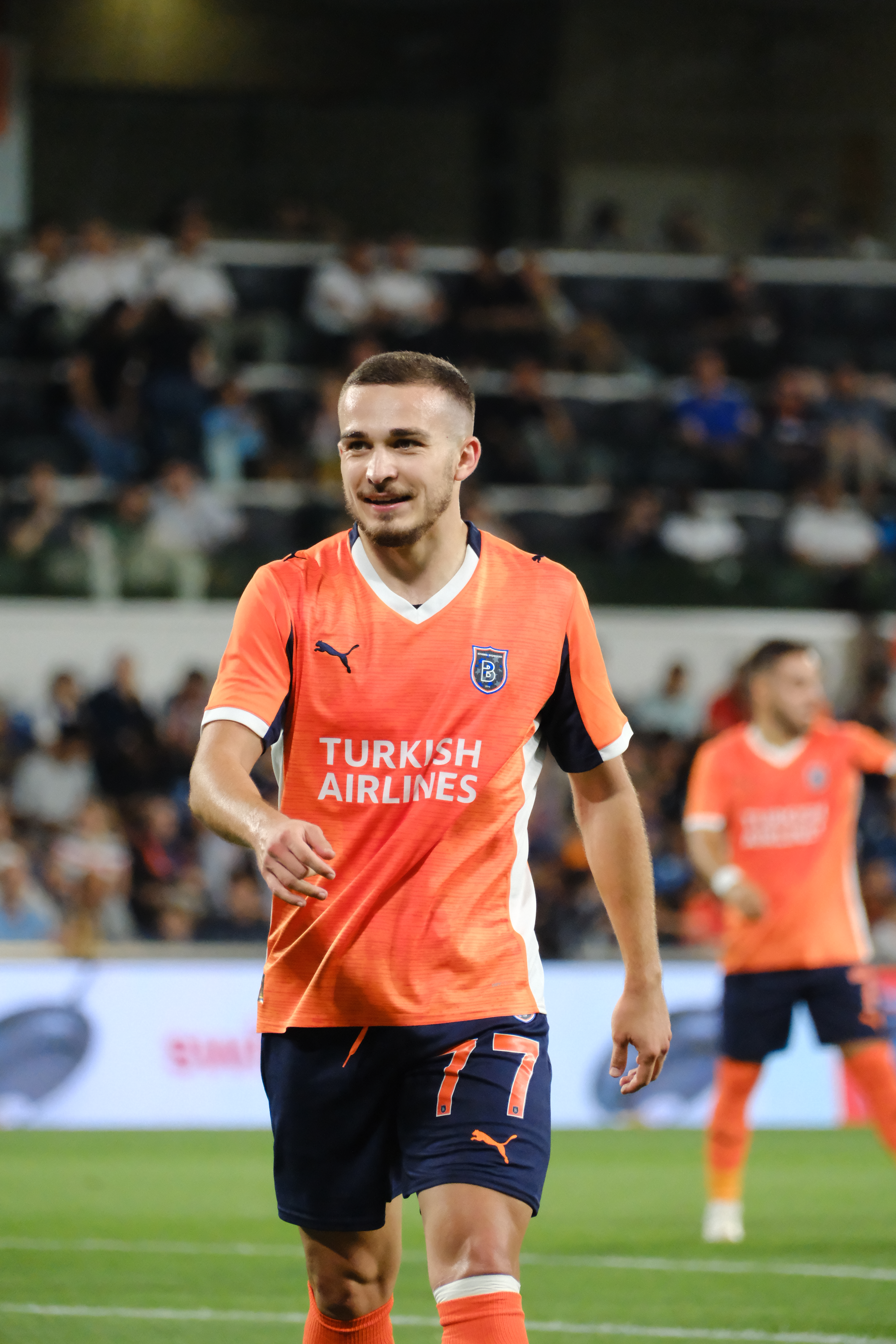

Personal information
- Date of birth: 23 August 2001 (age 25)
- Place of birth: Split, Croatia
- Height: 1.75 m (5 ft 9 in)
- Position: Winger

Team information
- Current team: İstanbul Başakşehir
- Number: 77

Youth career
- 2009–2011: Zmaj Makarska
- 2011–2020: Hajduk Split

Senior career*
Years	Team	Apps	(Gls)
2019–2021	Hajduk Split II	25	(5)
2020–2021	Hajduk Split	12	(0)
2021–2022	Dugopolje	26	(11)
2022–2023	Maribor	35	(7)
2023–2025	Olympiacos	4	(0)
2024	Olympiacos B	7	(3)
2024–2025	→ Celje (loan)	15	(4)
2025–	İstanbul Başakşehir	39	(7)

International career
2016	Croatia U15	5	(3)
2017–2018	Croatia U17	13	(3)
2019–2020	Croatia U19	9	(6)
2021–2022	Croatia U20	4	(1)
- * Club domestic league appearances and goals as of 10 June 2026

Ivan Brnić (born 23 August 2001) is a Croatian professional footballer who plays as a winger for Turkish club İstanbul Başakşehir.

== Career ==
Brnić spent his youth career in the Hajduk Split academy. He made his senior debut for Hajduk in June 2020 in a match against Inter Zaprešić.

== Career statistics ==
=== Club ===
As of 3 February 2024

Appearances and goals by club, season and competition
Club	Season	League			National cup		Continental		Total	
Club	Season	Division	Apps	Goals	Apps	Goals	Apps	Goals	Apps	Goals
Hajduk Split II	2018–19	Croatian Second League	3	1	—		—		3	1
Hajduk Split II	2019–20	Croatian Second League	5	1	—		—		5	1
Hajduk Split II	2020–21	Croatian Second League	17	3	—		—		17	3
Hajduk Split II	Total		25	5	—		—		25	5
Hajduk Split	2019–20	Croatian First League	7	0	0	0	0	0	7	0
Hajduk Split	2020–21	Croatian First League	5	0	0	0	0	0	5	0
Hajduk Split	Total		12	0	0	0	—		12	0
Dugopolje	2021–22	Croatian Second League	26	11	1	0	—		27	11
Maribor	2022–23	Slovenian PrvaLiga	34	7	5	2	8 (Note: Four appearances in UEFA Champions League, two appearances in UEFA Europa League, two appearances in UEFA Europa Conference League)	0	47	9
Maribor	2023–24	Slovenian PrvaLiga	1	0	0	0	6 (Note: Appearances in UEFA Europa Conference League)	2	7	2
Maribor	Total		35	7	5	2	14	2	54	11
Olympiacos	2023–24	Super League Greece	4	0	0	0	0	0	4	0
Career total			102	23	6	2	14	2	122	27
