= Stanko Jurić =

Croatian footballer (born 1996)

Personal information
- Date of birth: 16 August 1996 (age 30)
- Place of birth: Split, Croatia
- Height: 1.89 m (6 ft 2 in)
- Position: Defensive midfielder

Team information
- Current team: Valladolid
- Number: 24

Youth career
- Dalmatinac Split
- Adriatic Split
- 2012–2015: Dugopolje

Senior career*
Years	Team	Apps	(Gls)
2015–2018	Dugopolje	61	(3)
2018–2021	Hajduk Split	79	(5)
2021–2024	Parma	66	(3)
2023–2024	→ Valladolid (loan)	38	(2)
2024–	Valladolid	61	(1)
- * Club domestic league appearances and goals as of 9 June 2026

Stanko Jurić (born 16 August 1996) is a Croatian professional footballer who plays as a defensive midfielder for Spanish Segunda División club Valladolid.

== Career ==
Born in Split, Jurić started his youth career with the academy of local NK Dalmatinac Split, before joining the counterpart of NK Adriatic Split. In 2012, he joined the youth setup of NK Dugopolje. He was given a contract through 2019 and promoted to the senior team, which had just been demoted to the second tier, three years later. He participated in 25 games during his first season with the senior team. Subsequently, he cemented his place in his team, playing regularly and was also appointed as the club captain.

In winter of 2017, Jurić started training with Hajduk Split and went on to feature for the club in friendly matches. Amidst reports of Hajduk, Rijeka and Osijek's interest in signing him, he joined Hajduk Split on 15 February 2018 on a two-year deal. He played 14 times and scored one goal for the reserves in the 2017–18 season. On 2 August, he made his first team debut in a 3–2 victory over Bulgarian club Slavia Sofia in the UEFA Europa League. Coming on as a substitute for the injured Dino Beširović, he scored a goal in the 24th minute of the match. He dedicated his goal to his late grandfather. His first league goal came against Lokomotiva Zagreb in the 2nd round of 2018-19 Prva HNL.

In June 2019, after making 30 first team appearances in the 2018–19 HNK Hajduk Split season, Jurić signed a new contract with Hajduk, lasting until 30 June 2021.

On 18 June 2021, Italian Serie B side Parma announced the arrival of Jurić, as the midfielder penned a contract lasting until 30 June 2025.

On 19 August 2023, Jurić joined Valladolid in Spain on loan with an option to buy.

== Career statistics ==
As of 2 June 2024

Appearances and goals by club, season and competition
Club	Season	League			Cup		Continental		Other		Total	
Club	Season	Division	Apps	Goals	Apps	Goals	Apps	Goals	Apps	Goals	Apps	Goals
Dugopolje	2015–16	Druga HNL	25	0	0	0	—		—		25	0
Dugopolje	2016–17	Druga HNL	21	2	0	0	—		—		21	2
Dugopolje	2017–18	Druga HNL	15	1	0	0	—		—		15	1
Dugopolje	Total		61	3	0	0	—		—		61	3
Hajduk Split	2018–19	Prva HNL	24	3	3	1	3 (Note: Appearances in UEFA Europa League)	1	—		30	5
Hajduk Split	2019–20	Prva HNL	22	1	2	1	2	0	—		26	2
Hajduk Split	2020–21	Prva HNL	33	1	2	0	2	0	—		37	1
Hajduk Split	Total		79	5	7	2	7	1	—		93	8
Parma	2021–22	Serie B	36	3	1	0	—		—		37	3
Parma	2022–23	Serie B	30	0	3	1	—		1 (Note: Appearances in Serie B play off)	0	34	1
Parma	Total		66	3	4	1	—		1	0	71	4
Valladolid (loan)	2023–24	Segunda División	38	2	0	0	—		—		38	2
Career total			244	13	11	3	7	1	1	0	263	17
