= Jakov Blagaić =

Croatian footballer

Personal information
- Full name: Jakov Blagaić
- Date of birth: 8 February 2000 (age 26)
- Place of birth: Split, Croatia
- Height: 1.73 m (5 ft 8 in)
- Position: Attacking midfielder

Team information
- Current team: Rudeš
- Number: 20

Youth career
- –2011: Adriatic Split
- 2011–2017: Hajduk Split

Senior career*
Years	Team	Apps	(Gls)
2017–2021	Hajduk Split II	40	(11)
2019–2022	Hajduk Split	9	(0)
2020–2021	→ Olimpija Ljubljana (loan)	5	(0)
2021–2022	→ Široki Brijeg (loan)	25	(1)
2023–2024	Borac Banja Luka	40	(7)
2024–2025	Puszcza Niepołomice	22	(1)
2025–2026	Argeș Pitești	19	(0)
2026–	Rudeš	2	(0)

International career
2016	Croatia U16	2	(0)
2017	Croatia U17	2	(0)
2018	Croatia U18	2	(0)
2019	Croatia U19	5	(1)
2019	Croatia U20	1	(0)
- * Club domestic league appearances and goals as of 15 May 2026

Jakov Blagaić (born 8 February 2000) is a Croatian professional footballer who plays as an attacking midfielder for HNL club Rudeš.

== Club career ==
Blagaić started his senior career with Hajduk Split in the Croatian First Football League, where he has made nine league appearances during the 2019–20 season.

== Career statistics ==
=== Club ===
As of match played 15 May 2026

Club	Season	League			National cup (Note: Includes Slovenian Cup, Bosnian Cup, Polish Cup, Cupa României)		Europe		Other		Total	
Club	Season	Division	Apps	Goals	Apps	Goals	Apps	Goals	Apps	Goals	Apps	Goals
Hajduk Split II	2017–18	2. HNL	1	0	–		–		–		1	0
Hajduk Split II	2018–19	2. HNL	9	1	–		–		–		9	1
Hajduk Split II	2019–20	2. HNL	14	7	–		–		–		14	7
Hajduk Split II	2020–21	2. HNL	16	3	–		–		–		16	3
Hajduk Split II	Total		40	11	–		–		–		40	11
Hajduk Split	2019–20	1. HNL	9	0	–		–		–		9	0
Hajduk Split	2020–21	1. HNL	0	0	0	0	–		–		0	0
Hajduk Split	2021–22	1. HNL	0	0	–		0	0	–		0	0
Hajduk Split	2022–23	1. HNL	0	0	–		0	0	0	0	0	0
Hajduk Split	Total		9	0	0	0	0	0	0	0	9	0
Olimpija Ljubljana (loan)	2020–21	Slovenian PrvaLiga	5	0	1	0	1 (Note: Appearances in UEFA Europa League)	0	–		7	0
Široki Brijeg (loan)	2021–22	Bosnian Premier League	25	1	3	0	–		–		28	1
Borac Banja Luka	2022–23	Bosnian Premier League	11	2	1	0	–		–		12	2
Borac Banja Luka	2023–24	Bosnian Premier League	29	5	6	1	2 (Note: Appearances in UEFA Conference League)	0	–		37	6
Borac Banja Luka	Total		40	7	7	1	2	0	–		49	8
Puszcza Niepołomice	2024–25	Ekstraklasa	22	1	3	0	–		–		25	1
Argeș Pitești	2025–26	Liga I	19	0	6	1	–		–		25	1
Rudeš	2026–27	HNL	2	0	0	0	–		–		2	0
Career total			162	20	20	2	3	0	0	0	185	22

== Honours ==
Borac Banja Luka

- Bosnian Premier League: 2023–24
- Bosnian Cup runner-up: 2023–24
