= Marin Ljubić =

Croatian footballer (born 1997)

Personal information
- Date of birth: 18 October 1997 (age 29)
- Place of birth: Split, Croatia
- Height: 1.87 m (6 ft 2 in)
- Position: Goalkeeper

Team information
- Current team: NO CLUB
- Number: 40

Youth career
- –2016: Hajduk Split

Senior career*
Years	Team	Apps	(Gls)
2017–2019	Hajduk Split II	31	(0)
2016	→ Primorac Stobreč (loan)		
2017	→ Val Kaštel Stari (loan)		
2018–2021	Hajduk Split	12	(0)
2021–2022	İstanbulspor	6	(0)
2022	→ Mura (loan)	9	(0)
2023	Lahti	20	(0)
2024	Bunyodkor	13	(0)
2025	East Riffa		
2025–	Zrinjski	6	(0)
- * Club domestic league appearances and goals as of 12 February 2026

Marin Ljubić (born 18 October 1997) is a Croatian professional footballer who plays as a goalkeeper for Zrinjski.

== Career ==
=== Hajduk Split ===
On 29 July 2018, Ljubić made his Hajduk Split debut, coming on as a substitute for Tomislav Duka in a 4–1 defeat against Osijek. Four days later, he got his first start and a European debut in UEFA Europa League second round qualifier against Slavia Sofia. Ljubić had a couple of saves and helped Hajduk reach third qualifying round after a 3–2 win in Sofia.

=== FC Lahti ===
On 16 January 2023, Ljubić signed a one-year contract with Finnish Veikkausliiga side Lahti. During the season, he made a total of 24 appearances for the club.

=== FC Bunyodkor ===
Ljubić signed with Bunyodkor in Uzbekistan Super League for the 2024 season.

=== East Riffa ===
In 2025, Ljubić moved to Bahraini team East Riffa Club. On February 28, he scored a stoppage-time equalizing goal from a corner in the quarterfinals of the King's Cup against Al-Riffa, where his side would go on to lose via a penalty shootout in which he converted a penalty.

== Career statistics ==
As of 27 November 2024.

Appearances and goals by club, season and competition
Club	Season	League			National cup (Note: Includes Croatian Cup, Turkish Cup, Slovenian Cup, Suomen Cup and Uzbekistan Cup)		Continental		Other		Total	
Club	Season	Division	Apps	Goals	Apps	Goals	Apps	Goals	Apps	Goals	Apps	Goals
Hajduk Split II	2017–18	2. HNL	14	0	–		–		–		14	0
Hajduk Split II	2018–19	2. HNL	17	0	–		–		–		17	0
Hajduk Split II	Total		31	0	0	0	0	0	0	0	31	0
Hajduk Split	2018–19	1. HNL	3	0	1	0	1 (Note: Includes UEFA Europa League)	0	–		5	0
Hajduk Split	2019–20	1. HNL	8	0	1	0	0	0	–		9	0
Hajduk Split	2020–21	1. HNL	1	0	1	0	0	0	–		2	0
Hajduk Split	Total		12	0	3	0	1	0	0	0	16	0
İstanbulspor	2020–21	1. Lig	6	0	0	0	–		–		6	0
İstanbulspor	2021–22	1. Lig	0	0	2	0	–		–		2	0
İstanbulspor	2022–23	Süper Lig	0	0	0	0	–		–		0	0
İstanbulspor	Total		6	0	2	0	0	0	0	0	8	0
Mura (loan)	2021–22	Slovenian PrvaLiga	9	0	0	0	–		–		9	0
Lahti	2023	Veikkausliiga	20	0	0	0	–		4 (Note: Includes Finnish League Cup)	0	24	0
Bunyodkor	2024	Uzbekistan Super League	13	0	1	0	–		–		14	0
East Riffa	2024–25	Bahraini Premier League					–		–			
Career total			91	0	6	0	1	0	4	0	102	0
