= Samuel Eduok =

Nigerian association football player

Personal information
- Full name: Samuel Emem Eduok
- Date of birth: 31 January 1994 (age 32)
- Place of birth: Itu, Nigeria
- Height: 1.76 m (5 ft 9 in)
- Positions: Winger; striker

Senior career*
Years	Team	Apps	(Gls)
2011–2014	Dolphins		
2013	→ Akwa United (loan)		
2015–2017	Espérance	24	(7)
2016–2017	→ Kasımpaşa (loan)	29	(4)
2017–2019	Kasımpaşa	78	(19)
2019	BB Erzurumspor	15	(4)
2019–2023	Hajduk Split	34	(12)
2020	→ Konyaspor (loan)	4	(0)

International career^{‡}
- Nigeria U20
2015–	Nigeria	1	(0)
- * Club domestic league appearances and goals as of 12 November 2022 ‡ National team caps and goals as of 10:54, 29 January 2019 (UTC)

Samuel Emem Eduok (born 31 January 1994) is a Nigerian professional footballer who plays as a winger and striker.

== Club career ==
Born in Itu, Eduok played for Dolphins and Akwa United, and was the second-top scorer in the 2014 Nigeria Premier League with 20 goals. In December 2014 he signed a contract with Norwegian club Sarpsborg 08; after changing his mind he signed a second contract with Tunisian club Espérance in January 2015, resulting in a transfer row. He completed the transfer to Espérance later that month.

He moved initially on loan to Turkish club Kasımpaşa in August 2016. The loan deal became permanent at the end of the 2016–17 season.

In January 2019 he signed for BB Erzurumspor. He left the club at the end of the season.

On 19 July 2019 Eduok signed for Croatian First Football League club HNK Hajduk Split. He signed a 3-year contract and was given the number 11 shirt. Eduok scored on debut for Hajduk, coming off the bench and netting the 3rd goal in a 3–0 win over NK Varaždin at Stadion Varteks.

In August 2020 he signed for Turkish club Konyaspor on loan.

== International career ==
Eduok has played for the Nigeria under-20s, and played at the 2013 FIFA U-20 World Cup.

On Friday, 7 November 2014, he scored the first professional goal at the Godswill Akpabio International Stadium, Uyo, via a 35th-minute header off Solomon Kwambe's assist, as the home-based Super Eagles beat Ghana U23 team 1–0, in an unofficial international friendly held to commission the sports complex.

He had to pull out of the senior national team in January 2015 due to his ongoing club transfer row.

He made his senior debut as a 69th-minute substitute in the 2017 Cup of Nations qualifier at Tanzania.
