= Josip Posavec =

Croatian footballer (born 1996)

Personal information
- Full name: Josip Posavec
- Date of birth: 10 March 1996 (age 30)
- Place of birth: Varaždin, Croatia
- Height: 1.92 m (6 ft 4 in)
- Position: Goalkeeper

Team information
- Current team: Lokomotiva Zagreb
- Number: 12

Youth career
- 2006–2008: Milengrad 2005 Budinščina
- 2008–2010: Tondach Bedekovčina
- 2010–2015: Inter Zaprešić

Senior career*
Years	Team	Apps	(Gls)
2013–2016	Inter Zaprešić	25	(0)
2016–2019	Palermo	49	(0)
2018–2019	→ Hajduk Split (loan)	29	(0)
2019–2022	Hajduk Split	44	(0)
2022–2024	AaB	34	(0)
2024–2025	Rijeka	1	(0)
2025	→ Primorje (loan)	15	(0)
2025–	Lokomotiva Zagreb	33	(0)

International career^{‡}
2013	Croatia U17	1	(0)
2013	Croatia U19	1	(0)
2015–2019	Croatia U21	19	(0)
- * Club domestic league appearances and goals as of 15 June 2026 ‡ National team caps and goals as of 25 March 2019

Josip Posavec (born 10 March 1996) is a Croatian footballer who plays as a goalkeeper for Croatian Football League club NK Lokomotiva Zagreb

== Early life ==
He was born in Varaždin and grew up in Zajezda, within the municipality of Budinščina, where he started playing football at local club Milengrad.

== Career ==
=== Palermo ===
On 31 August 2015, the Serie A club Palermo announced that they had finalised the signing of Posavec, and that he will join the Italian club at the end of the football season 2015/2016. However, on 26 January 2016, Palermo announced that Posavec would join the club already in January, to replace Simone Colombi who left for Carpi.

=== Hajduk Split ===
On 7 July 2018, Posavec returned to the Croatian First Football League, signing for HNK Hajduk Split on a one-year loan deal. Posavec made his debut for Hajduk on 26 July 2017 in a 1–0 victory over PFC Slavia Sofia in the second round of 2018-19 UEFA Europa League qualifying phase, earning plaudits for his performance. Posavec made 33 appearances for Hajduk in all competitions.

On 8 June 2019, Hajduk announced that they had signed Posavec from Palermo on a permanent, four-year deal.

== Career statistics ==
As of match played 3 May 2026

Appearances and goals by club, season and competition
Club	Season	League			National Cup		Europe		Other		Total	
Club	Season	Division	Apps	Goals	Apps	Goals	Apps	Goals	Apps	Goals	Apps	Goals
Inter Zaprešić	2012–13	1. HNL	0	0	—		—		—		0	0
Inter Zaprešić	2013–14	1. HNL	2	0	0	0	—		—		2	0
Inter Zaprešić	2014–15	1. HNL	3	0	0	0	—		—		3	0
Inter Zaprešić	2015–16	1. HNL	20	0	0	0	—		—		20	0
Inter Zaprešić	Total		25	0	0	0	—		—		25	0
Palermo	2015–16	Serie A	1	0	—		—		—		1	0
Palermo	2016–17	Serie A	29	0	1	0	—		—		30	0
Palermo	2017–18	Serie B	19	0	2	0	—		0	0	21	0
Palermo	Total		49	0	3	0	—		0	0	52	0
Hajduk Split (loan)	2018–19	1. HNL	29	0	1	0	3	0	—		33	0
Hajduk Split	2019–20	1. HNL	26	0	1	0	0	0	—		27	0
Hajduk Split	2020–21	1. HNL	14	0	1	0	2	0	—		17	0
Hajduk Split	2021–22	1. HNL	4	0	0	0	0	0	—		4	0
Hajduk Split	Hajduk total		73	0	3	0	5	0	—		81	0
AaB	2022–23	Danish Superliga	10	0	0	0	—		—		10	0
AaB	2023–24	Danish 1st Division	24	0	1	0	—		—		25	0
AaB	Total		34	0	1	0	—		—		35	0
Rijeka	2024–25	HNL	1	0	1	0	1	0	—		3	0
Primorje (loan)	2024–25	Slovenian PrvaLiga	15	0	—		—		—		15	0
Lokomotiva Zagreb	2025–26	HNL	33	0	1	0	—		—		34	0
Career Total			230	0	8	0	6	0	0	0	244	0
