= Tomislav Duka =

Croatian footballer

Personal information
- Full name: Tomislav Duka
- Date of birth: 7 September 1992 (age 34)
- Place of birth: Split, Croatia
- Height: 1.90 m (6 ft 3 in)
- Position: Goalkeeper

Team information
- Current team: Orkan Dugi Rat

Youth career
- 2003–2007: Hajduk Split
- 2007–2011: RNK Split

Senior career*
| Years | Team | Apps | (Gls) |
| 2011–2017 | RNK Split | 37 | (0) |
| 2012 | → Kamen Ivanbegovina | ? | (?) |
| 2012–2013 | → Zagora Unešić (loan) | 28 | (0) |
| 2013–2014 | → Imotski (loan) | 21 | (0) |
| 2017–2018 | CFR Cluj | 0 | (0) |
| 2018–2019 | Hajduk Split | 3 | (0) |
| 2019–2020 | Istra 1961 | 8 | (0) |
| 2020 | Zagora Unešić | 12 | (0) |
| 2021–2023 | Žalgiris | 39 | (0) |
| 2024 | Velež Mostar | 2 | (0) |
| 2025 | Dugopolje | 14 | (0) |
| 2025–2026 | Zadar | 29 | (0) |
| 2026– | Orkan Dugi Rat | 0 | (0) |
- * Club domestic league appearances and goals as of 23 May 2026

Tomislav Duka (born 7 September 1992) is a Croatian professional footballer who plays a goalkeeper for Orkan Dugi Rat.

== Club career ==
Duka went through the youth teams of his hometown clubs HNK Hajduk Split and RNK Split, joining the latter at the age of 15, subsequently moving up to the club's senior side. The club's third-choice goalkeeper after Andrija Vuković and Danijel Zagorac, he went on a series of loans. First, the fourth-tier Kamen Ivanbegovina, which he helped achieve promotion to the Treća HNL Jug, he moved on to third-tier NK Zagora Unešić and then NK Imotski, which he, helped achieve promotion to the Druga HNL. After the departure of Andrija Vuković, Duka became the substitute of Danijel Zagorac, finally getting his chance to debut in the Prva HNL in March 2016, at the age of 23, in face of Zagorac's upcoming departure from the club. He gained some media recognition after starring in RNK Split's away 0–0 draw against HNK Rijeka, being hailed by the local media as the team's hero after the match.

After joining NK Istra 1961 in January 2020, Duka returned to NK Zagora Unešić in the Croatian Third Football League on 11 September 2020.

== Honours ==
=== Club ===
CFR Cluj

- Liga I: 2017–18

FK Žalgiris

- A lyga: 2021, 2022
