= 2018–19 HNK Hajduk Split season =

Hajduk Split
2018–19 season
- Chairman: Jasmin Huljaj (until 6 March 2019); Marin Brbić (from 6 March 2019)
- Manager: Željko Kopić (until 5 September 2018); Zoran Vulić (9 September 2018 - 26 November 2018); Siniša Oreščanin (from 27 November 2018)
- Prva HNL: 4th
- Croatian Cup: Quarter-finals
- Europa League: Third Qualifying round
- Top goalscorer: League: Mijo Caktaš (19); All: Mijo Caktaš (21)
- Highest home attendance: 26,664 (vs Dinamo Zagreb) (3 April 2019)
- Lowest home attendance: 0 (Five matches)
Home colours	Away colours

The 2018–19 season was the 108th season in Hajduk Split's history and their twenty-eighth in the Prva HNL.

== First-team squad ==
For details of former players, see List of HNK Hajduk Split players.

As of 4 March 2019

Note: Flags indicate national team as defined under FIFA eligibility rules; some limited exceptions apply. Players may hold more than one non-FIFA nationality.

No.	Pos.	Nation	Player
1	GK	CRO	Tomislav Duka
3	DF	ESP	Borja López
4	DF	CRO	Božo Mikulić
5	MF	GAM	Hamza Barry
6	MF	CRO	Darko Nejašmić
7	MF	HUN	Ádám Gyurcsó
8	FW	MKD	Mirko Ivanovski
10	MF	CRO	Mijo Caktaš (captain)
11	FW	CRO	Michele Šego
13	GK	CRO	Goran Blažević
14	DF	UKR	Oleksandr Svatok
15	MF	CRO	Ante Palaversa (on loan from Manchester City)
17	DF	CRO	Josip Juranović
18	MF	BIH	Dino Beširović
19	FW	CRO	Ivan Delić

No.	Pos.	Nation	Player
21	FW	BRA	Jairo
23	MF	AUS	Anthony Kalik
24	MF	CRO	Stanko Jurić
25	MF	ALB	Emir Sahiti
29	DF	AUT	Stipe Vučur
31	DF	GER	André Fomitschow
32	DF	CRO	Fran Tudor
33	DF	CRO	Domagoj Bradarić
34	DF	ALB	Ardian Ismajli
40	GK	CRO	Marin Ljubić
47	FW	ALB	Francesco Tahiraj
70	GK	CRO	Josip Posavec (on loan from Palermo)
91	FW	CRO	Tonio Teklić
93	MF	LBN	Bassel Jradi

== Competitions ==
=== Overview ===
Competition	First match	Last match	Starting round	Final position	Record							
Competition	First match	Last match	Starting round	Final position	Pld	W	D	L	GF	GA	GD	Win %
HT Prva liga	29 July 2020	26 May 2021	Matchday 1	4th	36	17	11	8	59	39	+20	47.22
Croatian Cup	26 September 2018	5 December 2018	First Round	Quarter-finals	3	2	0	1	5	3	+2	66.67
Europa League	26 July 2018	16 August 2018	Second qualifying round	Third qualifying round	4	2	1	1	5	4	+1	50.00
Total					43	21	12	10	69	46	+23	48.84

Source: Soccerway

=== HT Prva liga ===
==== Classification ====
Pos	Team	Pld	W	D	L	GF	GA	GD	Pts	Qualification or relegation
2	Rijeka	36	19	10	7	70	36	+34	67	Qualification for the Europa League third qualifying round (Note: Rijeka qualified for the Europa League third qualifying round by winning the 2018–19 Croatian Football Cup. As a result, the spot awarded to the runners-up (Europa League second qualifying round) was passed to the third-placed team, and the spot awarded to the third-placed team (Europa League first qualifying round) was passed to the fourth-placed team.)
3	Osijek	36	18	8	10	61	36	+25	62 (Note: Head-to-head points: Osijek 7 pts, Hajduk Split 4 pts.)	Qualification for the Europa League second qualifying round
4	Hajduk Split	36	17	11	8	59	39	+20	62	Qualification for the Europa League first qualifying round
5	Gorica	36	17	8	11	57	46	+11	59	
6	Lokomotiva	36	13	10	13	51	43	+8	49	

Source: PrvaHNL.hr
Rules for classification: 1) Points; 2) Head-to-head points; 3) Head-to-head goal difference; 4) Head-to-head goals scored (at home if two teams tied); 5) Goal difference; 6) Goals scored; 7) Play-off
(Note: Criteria 2-4 and 7 is only used if deciding champion, teams to international competition or teams for relegation and in that case criteria 6 will not be used).

==== Results summary ====
Overall								Home						Away					
Pld	W	D	L	GF	GA	GD	Pts	W	D	L	GF	GA	GD	W	D	L	GF	GA	GD
36	17	11	8	56	37	+19	62	9	6	3	28	15	+13	8	5	5	28	22	+6

Last updated: 26 May 2019.
Source: Competitive matches

==== Results by round ====
Round	1	2	3	4	5	6	7	8	9	10	11	12	13	14	15	16	17	18	19	20	21	22	23	24	25	26	27	28	29	30	31	32	33	34	35	36
Ground	H	A	A	H	A	A	H	A	H	H	H	A	H	A	H	A	H	A	H	A	H	A	H	A	H	A	H	A	H	A	H	A	H	A	H	A
Result	L	D	D	L	D	D	W	W	D	L	L	D	D	W	D	W	W	L	W	W	D	D	W	W	W	W	L	D	W	W	L	W	W	W	W	L
Position	9	9	7	8	8	8	7	6	6	7	7	7	7	6	6	6	6	6	6	6	6	6	6	6	5	4	5	5	4	4	4	4	4	4	3	4

Source: Competitive matches
A = Away; H = Home; W = Win; D = Draw; L = Loss

==== Results by opponent ====
Team	Results				Points
Team	1	2	3	4	Points
Dinamo Zagreb	0–0	0–1	0–1	1–3	1
Gorica	0–2	1–1	0–0	0–3	2
Inter Zaprešić	2–2	3–0	3–1	3–2	10
Istra 1961	4–2	3–1	2–0	4–1	12
Lokomotiva	1–1	0–2	2–1	1–0	7
Osijek	1–4	0–2	1–0	0–0	4
Rijeka	1–1	1–1	0–0	4–0	6
Rudeš	3–1	4–1	3–0	4–1	12
Slaven Belupo	1–1	2–2	2–1	2–0	8

Source: 2018–19 Croatian First Football League article

== Matches ==
=== Friendlies ===
==== Pre-season ====
23 June 2018 Friendly	Orkan	0–9	Hajduk Split	Dugi Rat, Croatia
		Report	Caktaš 24'; Delić 28', 39'; Ismajli 45'; S. Jurić 48'; Šego 51', 64'; Palaversa 65'; Ivanovski 90'	Stadium: ŠRC Dalmacija

29 June 2018 Friendly	Hajduk Split (Croatia)	4–0	(Poland) Górnik Zabrze	Split, Croatia
	Gyurcsó 4'; Šego 26'; T. Bašić 50'; Tudor 63'	Report		Stadium: Stadion Poljud; Attendance: 7, 800

6 July 2018 Friendly	Hajduk Split (Croatia)	3–0	(Bulgaria) Vereya	Limbuš, Slovenia
	Radošević 22'; Kreković 50'; Šego 56'	Report		Stadium: Pod Grajskim gričem

7 July 2018 Friendly	Rudar Velenje (Slovenia)	1–1	(Croatia) Hajduk Split	Maribor, Slovenia
	Tučić 30'	Report	S. Jurić 90'	Stadium: Ljudski Vrt, reserve field

13 July 2018 Friendly	Zorya Luhansk (Ukraine)	1–3	(Croatia) Hajduk Split	Kranjska Gora, Slovenia
	Karavayev 51'	Report	Vučur 50'; Delić 70'; Nejašmić 88'	Stadium: Športni park Rudeč

14 July 2018 Friendly	Rubin Kazan (Russia)	0–1	(Croatia) Hajduk Split	Bad Radkersburg, Austria
		Report	Delić 62'	Stadium: Parktherme-Arena

19 July 2018 Friendly	Rostov (Russia)	0–4	(Croatia) Hajduk Split	Judenburg, Austria
		Report	Hamza 22'; Caktaš 34'; Ivanovski 59'; Gyurcsó 70'

==== On-season ====
10 October 2018 Friendly	Zadar	1–3	Hajduk Split	Zadar, Croatia
	Majić 15'	Report	Said 9', 39'; K. Jurić 27' (o.g.)	Stadium: Stadion Stanovi

17 November 2018 Friendly	Troglav 1918 (Bosnia and Herzegovina)	0–0	(Croatia) Hajduk Split	Livno, Bosnia and Herzegovina
		Report		Stadium: Stadion Zgona; Attendance: 1,500; Referee: Robert Lozančić (Livno)

==== Mid-season ====
13 January 2019 Friendly	Dinamo București (Romania)	0–2	(Croatia) Hajduk Split	Belek, Turkey
		Report	Caktaš 4'; Gyurcsó 77'	Stadium: Sport Belek

19 January 2019 Friendly	Hajduk Split (Croatia)	0–1	(Switzerland) Grasshoper	Belek, Turkey
		Report	Kamber 81'	Stadium: Sport Belek; Attendance: 50

22 January 2019 Friendly	Shakhtar Donetsk (Ukraine)	1–4	(Croatia) Hajduk Split	Belek, Turkey
	Dentinho 30'	Report	Caktaš 21' (pen.); Delić 23'; Jairo 41'; Teklić 60'	Stadium: Sport Belek; Attendance: 100

25 January 2019 Friendly	Fakel Voronezh (Russia)	3–7	(Croatia) Hajduk Split	Belek, Turkey
	Gruznov 31', 68'; Malikov 50' (pen.)	Report	Šego 22'; Sahiti 29', 40'; Teklić 35' (pen.), 37'; Blagaić 48'; Pršir 66'	Stadium: Sport Belek; Attendance: 100

25 January 2019 Friendly	Shakhtyor Soligorsk (Belarus)	1–1	(Croatia) Hajduk Split	Belek, Turkey
	Bakaj 38'	Report	Caktaš 20'	Stadium: Sport Belek

=== HT Prva liga ===
29 July 2018 1	Osijek	4–1	Hajduk Split	Osijek
21:00 CEST (UTC+02:00)	Henty 19'; Mudražija 21'; Henty (yellow card) 30'; Pušić (yellow card) 39'; Kamenar (yellow card) 53'; Hajradinović 65' (pen.); Tomelin (yellow card) 68'; Pilj (yellow card) 77' (yellow-red card) 90+6'; Grgić (yellow card) 80'; Tomelin 90+3'	Report	Nižić 12'; Fomitschow (yellow card) 21'; B. López (yellow card) 51'	Stadium: Stadion Gradski vrt Attendance: 4,444; Referee: Fran Jović (Zagreb)

5 August 2018 2	Hajduk Split	1–1	Lokomotiva	Split
21:00 CEST (UTC+02:00)	Jurić 44'; Mikulić (yellow card) 35'; Jairo (yellow card) 65'; Ljubić (yellow card) 71'	Report	Ivanušec (yellow card) 23'; Karačić (yellow card) 41'; Radonjić (yellow card) 42'; Krstanović 57'	Stadium: Stadion Poljud; Attendance: 10,408; Referee: Damir Batinić (Osijek)

12 August 2018 3	Rijeka	1–1	Hajduk Split	Rijeka
21:00 CEST (UTC+02:00)	Zuta (yellow card) 23'; Punčec (yellow card) 39'; Puljić 62'; Župarić (yellow card) 84'	Report	Fomitschow (yellow card) 45+1'; Mikulić (yellow card) 78'; Caktaš 87' (pen.) (yellow card) 90+5'; Jairo (yellow card) 89'	Stadium: Stadion Rujevica; Attendance: 7,122; Referee: Igor Pajač (Zagreb)

19 August 2018 4	Hajduk Split	0–2	Gorica	Split
21:00 CEST (UTC+02:00)	Jradi (yellow card) 61'; Said (red card) 90+1'; Šego (yellow card) 90+7'	Report	Miya 27'; Zwoliński 40' (pen.) (yellow card) 41'; Suk (yellow card) 51'; Dvorneković (yellow card) 66'; Špičić (yellow card) 79'	Stadium: Stadion Poljud; Attendance: 11,172; Referee: Marin Vidulin (Kanfanar)

26 August 2018 5	Inter Zaprešić	2–2	Hajduk Split	Zaprešić
18:30 CEST (UTC+02:00)	Andrić 15'; Vukčević 57' (yellow card) 90+2'; Ćulum (yellow card) 65'; Prenga (yellow card) 74'; Postonjski (yellow card) 86'; Čeliković (yellow card) 90+2'	Report	Jradi (yellow card) 16'; Palaversa 42'; Ivanovski 75' (pen.)	Stadium: Stadion ŠRC Zaprešić; Attendance: 965; Referee: Tihomir Pejin (Donji Miholjac)

1 September 2018 6	Slaven Belupo	1–1	Hajduk Split	Koprivnica
18:30 CEST (UTC+02:00)	Delić 17'; Puclin (yellow card) 19'; Musa (yellow card) 56'; Međimorec (yellow card) 66'; Jelić (yellow card) 75'	Report	Juranović (yellow card) 18'; Jairo 33'; S.Jurić (yellow card) 86'; Fomitschow (yellow card) 86'	Stadium: Gradski Stadion Ivan Kušek Apaš; Attendance: 2,200; Referee: Ivan Bebek (Rijeka)

15 September 2018 7	Hajduk Split	3–1	Rudeš	Split
19:00 CEST (UTC+02:00)	Caktaš 21', 74' (pen.) (yellow card) 21'; Vučur (yellow card) 46'; Ivanovski 61'; Gyurcsó (yellow card) 79'	Report	Petrović (yellow card) 18'; Andrey (yellow card) 26' (goal) 90'; Pantalon (yellow card) 44'; Mišković (yellow card) 83'	Stadium: Stadion Poljud; Attendance: 7,439; Referee: Damir Batinić (Osijek)

23 September 2018 8	Istra 1961	2–4	Hajduk Split	Pula
19:00 CEST (UTC+02:00)	J. Rodriguez 40'; Mierez 52' (yellow card) 87'; Oneto (yellow card) 70'; Grujević (red card) 90+2'	Report	Gyurcsó 21', 25'; Ivanovski 36', 65'; Filip (yellow card) 49'; Caktaš (penalty missed) 90+4'	Stadium: Stadion Aldo Drosina; Attendance: 3,470; Referee: Igor Pajač (Sveti Ivan Zelina)

29 September 2018 9	Hajduk Split	0–0	Dinamo Zagreb	Split
16:30 CEST (UTC+02:00)	Ivanovski (yellow card) 55'; Palaversa (yellow card) 76'; Hamza (yellow card) 90+5'	Report	Théophile-Catherine (yellow card) 74'	Stadium: Stadion Poljud; Attendance: 21,472; Referee: Ivan Bebek (Rijeka)

7 October 2018 10	Hajduk Split	0–2	Osijek	Split
19:00 CEST (UTC+02:00)	Hamza (yellow card) 89'	Report	Boban 36'; Grgić (yellow card) 55'; Marić 60'; Gutieri Tomelin (yellow card) 78'; Janža (yellow card) 81'	Stadium: Stadion Poljud; Attendance: 8,545; Referee: Ivan Bebek (Rijeka)

21 October 2018 11	Lokomotiva	2–0	Hajduk Split	Zagreb
17:30 CEST (UTC+02:00)	Drožđek 24'; Datković (yellow card) 33'; Hujber (yellow card) 57'; Uzuni 69' (yellow card) 69'	Report	Caktaš (yellow card) 36'; Said (yellow card) 55'	Stadium: Stadion Kranjčevićeva; Attendance: 2,437; Referee: Damir Batinić (Osijek)

28 October 2018 12	Hajduk Split	1–1	Rijeka	Split
15:00 CET (UTC+01:00)	Jurić (yellow card) 5'; Said 26' (pen.)	Report	Čolak (yellow card) 13'; Gorgon 50' (pen.); Čanađija (yellow card) 58'; Župarić (yellow card) 90+2'	Stadium: Stadion Poljud; Attendance: 0 Referee: Tihomir Pejin (Donji Miholjac)

4 November 2018 13	Gorica	1–1	Hajduk Split	Velika Gorica
15:00 CET (UTC+01:00)	Atiemwen 12'; Marina (yellow card) 20'; Čagalj (red card) 43'; Čabraja (yellow card) 53'	Report	Ismajli (yellow card) 2'; Jradi (yellow card) 16'; Jairo 31'; Bradarić (yellow card) 55'; Juranović (yellow card) 67'; Ivanovski (yellow card) 70'	Stadium: Stadion Radnik; Attendance: 3,711; Referee: Fran Jović (Zagreb)

10 November 2018 14	Hajduk Split	3–0	Inter Zaprešić	Split
17:30 CET (UTC+01:00)	Palaversa 19'; Jairo 48'; Said 65'	Report		Stadium: Stadion Poljud; Attendance: 0 Referee: Damir Batinić (Osijek)

25 November 2018 15	Hajduk Split	2–2	Slaven Belupo	Split
15:00 CET (UTC+01:00)	Said 44'; Jurić (yellow card) 64'; Jairo 74'; Teklić (yellow card) 90'	Report	M. Lima 31'; Bogojević (yellow card) 34' (goal) 65'; Međimorec (yellow card) 36'; Šarlija (yellow card) 43'; Doležal (yellow card) 82'	Stadium: Stadion Poljud; Attendance: 0 Referee: Marin Vidulin (Kanfanar)

1 December 2018 16	Rudeš	1–4	Hajduk Split	Zagreb
17:30 CET (UTC+01:00)	Kalik (yellow card) 4'; Klepač (yellow card) 65'; Tomičić 82'	Report	Obanor 7' (o.g.); Caktaš 24'; Jairo 64', 69'	Stadium: Stadion Kranjčevićeva; Attendance: 900; Referee: Marko Matoc (Zaprešić)

8 December 2018 17	Hajduk Split	3–1	Istra 1961	Split
17:30 CET (UTC+01:00)	Jradi (yellow card) 61'; Juranović (yellow card) 61'; Vučur 67'; Caktaš 76' (pen.); Ivanovski 84' (yellow card) 85'	Report	Fuentes 51'; Traoré (yellow card) 61'; Rubić (yellow card) 75'	Stadium: Stadion Poljud; Attendance: 0 Referee: Dalibor Mlakar (Zagreb)

16 December 2018 18	Dinamo Zagreb	1–0	Hajduk Split	Zagreb
15:00 CET (UTC+01:00)	Musa (yellow card) 22'; Kądzior 49'; Olmo (yellow card) 53'	Report	Tudor (yellow card) 9'; Nejašmić (yellow card) 43'	Stadium: Stadion Maksimir; Attendance: 11,064; Referee: Ivan Bebek (Rijeka)

3 February 2019 19	Osijek	0–1	Hajduk Split	Osijek
15:00 CET (UTC+01:00)	Grgić (yellow card) 89'; Pušić (yellow card) 89'	Report	Caktaš (yellow card) 27' (goal) 49'; Posavec (yellow card) 85'	Stadium: Stadion Gradski vrt Attendance: 2,680; Referee: Ivan Bebek (Rijeka)

10 February 2019 20	Hajduk Split	2–1	Lokomotiva	Split
17:30 CET (UTC+01:00)	Ismajli 42'; Caktaš 63'	Report	Uzuni 52'; Karačić (yellow card) 77'	Stadium: Stadion Poljud; Attendance: 17,308; Referee: Damir Batinić (Osijek)

16 February 2019 21	Rijeka	0–0	Hajduk Split	Rijeka
15:00 CET (UTC+01:00)	Lončar (yellow card) 40'	Report	Ismajli (yellow card) 31'; B. Lopez (yellow card) 84'; Hamza (yellow card) 89'; Tudor (yellow card) 89'	Stadium: Stadion Rujevica; Attendance: 6,527; Referee: Fran Jović (Zagreb)

23 February 2019 22	Hajduk Split	0–0	Gorica	Split
17:30 CET (UTC+01:00)	B. Lopez (yellow card) 48'; Nejašmić (yellow card) 73'; Tudor (yellow card) 87'	Report	Zwolinski (yellow card) 54'; Marina (yellow card) 63'	Stadium: Stadion Poljud; Attendance: 6,408; Referee: Marin Vidulin (Kanfanar)

3 March 2019 23	Inter Zaprešić	1–3	Hajduk Split	Zaprešić
15:00 CET (UTC+01:00)	Kaluđerović (yellow card) 45'; Brezovec (yellow card) 83'; Tsonev 90+4'	Report	Jairo 14', 20'; Caktaš 52'; Tahiraj (yellow card) 83'	Stadium: Stadion ŠRC Zaprešić; Attendance: 2,771; Referee: Ivan Bebek (Rijeka)

9 March 2019 24	Slaven Belupo	1–2	Hajduk Split	Koprivnica
15:00 CET (UTC+01:00)	Međimorec (yellow card) 9'; Zirdum (yellow card) 33' (yellow-red card) 68'; Jelić 57' (pen.); Bongongui (yellow card) 75'; Bogojević (yellow card) 78'; Vidović (yellow card) 88'	Report	Ismajli (yellow card) 52'; Juranović (red card) 56'; Caktaš (yellow card) 62'; Tahiraj (yellow card) 75'; Jradi (yellow card) 80'; Jurić 88'; Tudor 90+2'	Stadium: Gradski Stadion Ivan Kušek Apaš; Attendance: 2,683; Referee: Fran Jović (Zagreb)

16 March 2019 25	Hajduk Split	3–0	Rudeš	Split
17:30 CET (UTC+01:00)	Caktaš 30', 90+1'; Jairo 80'; Svatok (yellow card) 88' (yellow-red card) 90'	Report	Rožman (yellow card) 44'	Stadium: Stadion Poljud; Attendance: 11,239; Referee: Marko Matoc (Zaprešić)

30 March 2019 26	Istra 1961	0–2	Hajduk Split	Pula
19:00 CET (UTC+01:00)	Galilea (yellow card) 14'; Sané (yellow card) 61'; Franić (red card) 89'	Report	Jairo 11'; Ismajli (yellow card) 36'; B. López (yellow card) 59'; Gyurcsó 90'	Stadium: Stadion Aldo Drosina; Attendance: 2,414; Referee: Ivan Vučković (Zagreb)

3 April 2019 27	Hajduk Split	0–1	Dinamo Zagreb	Split
19:00 CEST (UTC+02:00)	Bradarić (yellow card) 16'; Caktaš (red card) 77'; Ismajli (yellow card) 85'; B. López (yellow card) 87'	Report	Théophile-Catherine (yellow card) 5'; Gavranović 26'; Šunjić (yellow card) 77'; Olmo (yellow card) 80'; Gojak (yellow card) 88'; Livaković (yellow card) 90+2'	Stadium: Stadion Poljud; Attendance: 26,664; Referee: Damir Batinić (Osijek)

7 April 2019 28	Hajduk Split	0–0	Osijek	Split
19:00 CEST (UTC+02:00)	Ismajli (yellow card) 32'; Hamza (yellow card) 78'; Tudor (yellow card) 90+2'	Report	Lončar (yellow card) 66'; Guti (yellow card) 70'; Šorša (yellow card) 90+1'	Stadium: Stadion Poljud; Attendance: 7,862; Referee: Igor Pajač (Sveti Ivan Zelina)

14 April 2019 29	Lokomotiva	0–1	Hajduk Split	Zagreb
19:00 CEST (UTC+02:00)	Majstorović (yellow card) 55'; Kastrati (yellow card) 89'	Report	Jairo 80'	Stadium: Stadion Kranjčevićeva; Attendance: 2,410; Referee: Ivan Bebek (Rijeka)

20 April 2019 30	Hajduk Split	4–0	Rijeka	Split
19:00 CEST (UTC+02:00)	Jurić 2'; Hamza 30'; Caktaš 45', 50'; Svatok (yellow card) 87'	Report	Halilović (yellow card) 77'	Stadium: Stadion Poljud; Attendance: 14,752; Referee: Fran Jović (Zagreb)

27 April 2019 31	Gorica	3–0	Hajduk Split	Velika Gorica
16:30 CEST (UTC+02:00)	Miya 11', 47'; Zwolinski 45' (pen.) (yellow card) 48'; Maloča (yellow card) 56'; Lovrić (yellow card) 88'	Report	Posavec (yellow card) 43'; Jairo (yellow card) 51'; Bradarić (yellow card) 52'; Ismajli (yellow card) 59'	Stadium: Stadion Radnik; Attendance: 3,371; Referee: Damir Batinić (Osijek)

4 May 2019 32	Hajduk Split	3–2	Inter Zaprešić	Split
16:30 CEST (UTC+02:00)	Muhar 32' (o.g.); Ismajli (yellow card) 33'; Caktaš 44', 71'	Report	Svatok 13' (o.g.); Haramustek (yellow card) 42'; Šimunec (yellow card) 54'; Buljat (yellow card) 72'; Postonjski (yellow card) 81'; Tsonev 90+2'	Stadium: Stadion Poljud; Attendance: 5,236; Referee: Fran Jović (Zagreb)

10 May 2019 33	Hajduk Split	2–0	Slaven Belupo	Split
19:00 CEST (UTC+02:00)	Jradi 51'; Jairo (yellow card) 61' (goal) 66'; Ismajli (yellow card) 72'	Report	Vidović (yellow card) 45+1'; Puclin (yellow card) 61'	Stadium: Stadion Poljud; Attendance: 6,904; Referee: Ivan Vučković (Zagreb)

14 May 2019 34	Rudeš	1–4	Hajduk Split	Zagreb
19:00 CEST (UTC+02:00)	Joao Erick (yellow card) 54'; Štrkalj (yellow card) 59'; Lisakovich 62'; Pejović (yellow card) 90'	Report	Caktaš 17', 58', 65'; Jradi 66'; Kalik (yellow card) 86'	Stadium: Stadion Kranjčevićeva; Attendance: 738; Referee: Igor Pajač (Sveti Ivan Zelina)

19 May 2019 35	Hajduk Split	4–1	Istra 1961	Split
16:30 CEST (UTC+02:00)	Caktaš 48'; Gyurcsó 56'; Jairo 77'; Bradarić (yellow card) 79'; Nejašmić 90+3'	Report	Ivančić 6' (yellow card) 81'; Fuentes (yellow card) 44'; Ramadani (yellow card) 53'; Galilea (yellow card) 83'; Burić (yellow card) 89'	Stadium: Stadion Poljud; Attendance: 0 Referee: Tihomir Pejin (Donji Miholjac)

26 May 2019 36	Dinamo Zagreb	3–1	Hajduk Split	Zagreb
19:00 CEST (UTC+02:00)	Hajrović 20'; Gavranović 49', 57'; Stojanović (yellow card) 68'; Théophile-Catherine (yellow card) 70'; Šunjić (yellow card) 86'	Report	Hamza (yellow card) 16'; Svatok (yellow card) 44'; Caktaš 68'	Stadium: Stadion Maksimir; Attendance: 15,433; Referee: Ivan Bebek (Rijeka)

=== Croatian Cup ===
26 September 2018 R1	Vrapče	0–2	Hajduk Split	Zagreb
15:30 CEST (UTC+02:00)	Mioković (yellow card) 31'; Razum (yellow card) 66'; Završki (yellow card) 68'	Report	Šehić (yellow card) 40'; Jradi 49'; Nejašmić (yellow card) 50'; Said 67' (pen.)	Stadium: Igralište NK Vrapče; Attendance: 1,500; Referee: Marko Matoc (Zaprešić)

31 October 2018 R2	Šibenik	1–2 (a.e.t.)	Hajduk Split	Šibenik
14:00 CET (UTC+01:00)	Ivanovski 13' (o.g.); Ampem (yellow card) 42'; Pecolaj (yellow card) (red card) 43'; Vukorepa (yellow card) 75'; Kendeš (yellow card) 79'; Blaić (yellow card) 105'; Musa (yellow card) 106'	Report	Said (yellow card) 63' (goal) 87'; Jurić (yellow card) 90' (goal) 119'; Juranović (yellow card) 109'	Stadium: Stadion Šubićevac; Attendance: 2,798; Referee: Dalibor Mlakar (Zagreb)

5 December 2018 QF	Osijek	2–1	Hajduk Split	Osijek
17:00 CET (UTC+01:00)	Bočkaj 27'; Škorić (yellow card) 36'; Henty 39'; Pušić (yellow card) 56'; Lončar (yellow card) 81'; Boban (yellow card) 81'	Report	Ismajli (yellow card) 50'; Gyurcsó 64'; Caktaš (yellow card) 90+2'	Stadium: Stadion Gradski vrt Attendance: 3,345; Referee: Igor Pajač (Sveti Ivan Zelina)

Source: Croatian Football Federation

=== UEFA Europa League ===
==== Second qualifying round ====
26 July 2018 First leg	Hajduk Split (Croatia)	1–0	(Bulgaria) Slavia Sofia	Split, Croatia
20:00 CEST (UTC+02:00)	Said 79' (yellow card) 80'; Gyurcsó (yellow card) 87'; Fomitschow (yellow card) 90+3'	Report	Uzunov (yellow card) 39'; G. Ivanov (yellow card) 42'; Aleksandrov (yellow card) 68' (yellow-red card) 84'; Yomov (yellow card) 90+7'	Stadium: Stadion Poljud; Attendance: 26,103; Referee: István Kovács (Romania)

2 August 2018 Second leg	Slavia Sofia (Bulgaria)	2–3 (2–4 agg.)	(Croatia) Hajduk Split	Sofia, Bulgaria
18:00 EEST (UTC+03:00)	Martinov (yellow card) 23'; G. Ivanov (yellow card) 32' (goal) 45' (pen.); Chunchukov (yellow card) 33'; Yomov 70'; Gamakov (yellow card) 84'	Report	Fomitschow (yellow card) 19'; Jurić 25'; Mikulić (yellow card) 30'; Hamza (yellow card) 51'; Caktaš 55' (pen.), 87'	Stadium: Vasil Levski National Stadium; Attendance: 6,000; Referee: Daniele Doveri (Italy)

==== Third qualifying round ====
9 August 2018 First leg	Hajduk Split (Croatia)	0–0	(Romania) Steaua București	Split, Croatia
20:45 CEST (UTC+02:00)	B.López (yellow card) 12'; Hamza (yellow card) 74'; Juranović (yellow card) 86'	Report	Tănase (yellow card) 37'; Gnohéré (yellow card) 45+1'; Morais (yellow card) 69'; Bălgrădean (yellow card) 82'	Stadium: Stadion Poljud; Attendance: 25,764; Referee: Tiago Martins (Portugal)

16 August 2018 Second leg	Steaua București (Romania)	2–1 (2–1 agg.)	(Croatia) Hajduk Split	Bucharest, Romania
21:30 EEST (UTC+03:00)	Tănase (yellow card) 45'; Gnohéré 55' (pen.), 90+3'; Morais (yellow card) 86'; Rusescu (yellow card) 90+2'; Benzar (yellow card) 90+4'	Report	Hamza (yellow card) 49'; Ivanovski (yellow card) 58'; B.López (yellow card) 58'; Šego (yellow card) 74'; Caktaš (yellow card) 79'; Said 82'; Vučur (yellow card) 90+4'	Stadium: Arena Națională; Attendance: 25,000; Referee: Juan Martínez Munuera (Spain)

Source: uefa.com

== Player seasonal records ==
Updated 27 February 2021

=== Goals ===
Rank	Name	League	Europe	Cup	Total
1	(Croatia) Mijo Caktaš	19	2	–	21
2	(Brazil) Jairo	13	–	–	13
3	(Italy) Said Ahmed Said	3	2	2	7
4	(North Macedonia) Mirko Ivanovski	5	–	–	5
4	(Croatia) Stanko Jurić	3	1	1	5
4	(Hungary) Ádám Gyurcsó	4	–	1	5
5	(Lebanon) Bassel Jradi	2	–	1	3
6	(Croatia) Ante Palaversa	2	–	–	2
7	(Croatia) Zoran Nižić	1	–	–	1
7	(Austria) Stipe Vučur	1	–	–	1
7	(Albania) Ardian Ismajli	1	–	–	1
7	(Croatia) Fran Tudor	1	–	–	1
7	(The Gambia) Hamza Barry	1	–	–	1
7	(Croatia) Darko Nejašmić	1	–	–	1
Own goals		2	–	–	2
TOTALS		59	5	5	69

Source: Competitive matches

=== Clean sheets ===
Rank	Name	League	Europe	Cup	Total
1	(Croatia) Josip Posavec	10	2	1	13
2	(Croatia) Goran Blažević	1	–	–	1
TOTALS		11	2	1	14

Source: Competitive matches

=== Disciplinary record ===
Number	Position	Player	1. HNL			Europa League			Croatian Cup			Total		
Number	Position	Player	Yellow card	(yellow card) (yellow-red card)	Red card	Yellow card	(yellow card) (yellow-red card)	Red card	Yellow card	(yellow card) (yellow-red card)	Red card	Yellow card	(yellow card) (yellow-red card)	Red card
2	DF	(Bosnia and Herzegovina) Edin Šehić	0	0	0	0	0	0	1	0	0	1	0	0
3	DF	(Spain) Borja López	5	0	0	2	0	0	0	0	0	7	0	0
4	DF	(Croatia) Božo Mikulić	2	0	0	1	0	0	0	0	0	3	0	0
5	MF	(The Gambia) Hamza Barry	5	0	0	3	0	0	0	0	0	8	0	0
6	MF	(Croatia) Darko Nejašmić	2	0	0	0	0	0	1	0	0	3	0	0
7	FW	(Hungary) Ádám Gyurcsó	1	0	0	1	0	0	0	0	0	2	0	0
8	FW	(North Macedonia) Mirko Ivanovski	3	0	0	1	0	0	0	0	0	4	0	0
10	MF	(Croatia) Mijo Caktaš	5	0	1	1	0	0	1	0	0	7	0	1
11	MF	(Croatia) Michele Šego	1	0	0	1	0	0	0	0	0	2	0	0
14	DF	(Ukraine) Oleksandr Svatok	2	1	0	0	0	0	0	0	0	2	1	0
15	MF	(Croatia) Ante Palaversa	1	0	0	0	0	0	0	0	0	1	0	0
17	DF	(Croatia) Josip Juranović	3	0	1	1	0	0	1	0	0	5	0	1
21	FW	(Brazil) Jairo	4	0	0	0	0	0	0	0	0	4	0	0
22	FW	(Italy) Said Ahmed Said	1	0	1	1	0	0	1	0	0	3	0	1
23	MF	(Australia) Anthony Kalik	1	0	0	0	0	0	0	0	0	1	0	0
24	MF	(Croatia) Stanko Jurić	3	0	0	0	0	0	1	0	0	4	0	0
29	DF	(Austria) Stipe Vučur	1	0	0	1	0	0	0	0	0	2	0	0
31	DF	(Germany) André Fomitschow	3	0	0	2	0	0	0	0	0	5	0	0
32	DF	(Croatia) Fran Tudor	4	0	0	0	0	0	0	0	0	4	0	0
33	DF	(Croatia) Domagoj Bradarić	4	0	0	0	0	0	0	0	0	4	0	0
34	DF	(Albania) Ardian Ismajli	9	0	0	0	0	0	1	0	0	10	0	0
40	GK	(Croatia) Marin Ljubić	1	0	0	0	0	0	0	0	0	1	0	0
47	FW	(Albania) Francesco Tahiraj	2	0	0	0	0	0	0	0	0	2	0	0
70	GK	(Croatia) Josip Posavec	2	0	0	0	0	0	0	0	0	2	0	0
77	DF	(Romania) Steliano Filip	1	0	0	0	0	0	0	0	0	1	0	0
91	FW	(Croatia) Tonio Teklić	1	0	0	0	0	0	0	0	0	1	0	0
93	MF	(Lebanon) Bassel Jradi	5	0	0	0	0	0	0	0	0	5	0	0
TOTALS			72	1	3	15	0	0	7	0	0	94	1	3

=== Appearances and goals ===
Number	Position	Player	Apps	Goals	Apps	Goals	Apps	Goals	Apps	Goals
Number	Position	Player	Total		1. HNL (Note: First number represents appearances in starting eleven, while the second number indicates a substitute appearance.)		Europa League		Croatian Cup	
1	GK	(Croatia) Tomislav Duka	1	0	1+0	0	0+0	0	0+0	0
2	DF	(Bosnia and Herzegovina) Edin Šehić	4	0	2+1	0	0+0	0	1+0	0
3	DF	(Spain) Borja López	28	0	22+1	0	4+0	0	1+0	0
4	DF	(Croatia) Božo Mikulić	12	0	7+1	0	3+0	0	1+0	0
5	MF	(The Gambia) Hamza Barry	30	1	24+2	1	4+0	0	0+0	0
6	MF	(Croatia) Darko Nejašmić	23	1	21+0	1	0+0	0	2+0	0
7	FW	(Hungary) Ádám Gyurcsó	37	5	21+10	4	3+1	0	0+2	1
8	FW	(North Macedonia) Mirko Ivanovski	24	5	12+8	5	3+0	0	1+1	0
9	FW	(Hungary) Márkó Futács	1	0	0+0	0	0+1	0	0+0	0
10	MF	(Croatia) Mijo Caktaš	34	21	28+0	19	4+0	2	2+0	0
11	FW	(Croatia) Michele Šego	9	0	0+5	0	0+3	0	0+1	0
13	GK	(Croatia) Goran Blažević	6	0	4+1	0	0+0	0	1+0	0
14	DF	(Ukraine) Oleksandr Svatok	10	0	10+0	0	0+0	0	0+0	0
15	MF	(Croatia) Ante Palaversa	30	2	21+6	2	1+0	0	1+1	0
17	DF	(Croatia) Josip Juranović	28	0	22+0	0	4+0	0	2+0	0
18	MF	(Bosnia and Herzegovina) Dino Beširović	3	0	1+1	0	1+0	0	0+0	0
19	FW	(Croatia) Ivan Delić	9	0	2+6	0	0+1	0	0+0	0
21	FW	(Brazil) Jairo	38	13	33+2	13	0+1	0	2+0	0
22	FW	(Italy) Said Ahmed Said	17	7	7+4	3	0+4	2	1+1	2
23	DF	(Croatia) Zoran Nižić	2	1	1+0	1	1+0	0	0+0	0
23	MF	(Australia) Anthony Kalik	9	0	4+5	0	0+0	0	0+0	0
24	MF	(Croatia) Stanko Jurić	30	5	14+10	3	2+1	1	3+0	1
25	MF	(Albania) Emir Sahiti	4	0	0+4	0	0+0	0	0+0	0
29	DF	(Austria) Stipe Vučur	18	1	13+1	1	2+1	0	1+0	0
31	DF	(Germany) André Fomitschow	20	0	10+3	0	4+0	0	2+1	0
32	MF	(Croatia) Fran Tudor	27	0	16+8	0	1+0	0	2+0	0
33	DF	(Croatia) Domagoj Bradarić	24	0	21+1	0	0+0	0	1+1	0
34	DF	(Albania) Ardian Ismajli	23	1	20+0	1	0+0	0	3+0	0
40	GK	(Croatia) Marin Ljubić	5	0	2+1	0	1+0	0	1+0	0
41	FW	(Albania) Francesco Tahiraj	11	0	6+5	0	0+0	0	0+0	0
70	GK	(Croatia) Josip Posavec	33	0	29+0	0	3+0	0	1+0	0
77	DF	(Romania) Steliano Filip	6	0	4+2	0	0+0	0	0+0	0
91	FW	(Croatia) Tonio Teklić	4	0	0+3	0	0+0	0	0+1	0
93	MF	(Lebanon) Bassel Jradi	28	3	18+7	2	0+0	0	3+0	1
99	FW	(Croatia) Franko Kovačević	3	0	0+1	0	0+0	0	1+1	0

Source: hajduk.hr

=== Overview of statistics ===
Statistic	Overall	1. HNL	Croatian Cup	Europa League
Most appearances	Jairo (37)	Jairo (34)	8 players (3)	7 players (4)
Most starts	Jairo (34)	Jairo (32)	5 players (3)	5 players (4)
Most substitute appearances	Gyurcsó (13)	Jurić & Gyurcsó (10)	4 players (2)	Said (4)
Most minutes played	Jairo (3,010)	Jairo (2,773)	Ismajli (300)	Caktaš, Juranović & Fomitschow (360)
Top goalscorer	Caktaš (19)	Caktaš (17)	Said (2)	Caktaš & Said (2)
Most assists	Jairo (9)	Jairo & Gyurcsó (8)	–	T. Bašić (2)
Most yellow cards	Ismajli (10)	Ismajli (9)	–	Hamza (3)
Most red cards	4 players (1)	4 players (1)	–	–
Last updated: 27 May 2019.

== Transfers ==
=== In ===
Date	Position	Player	From	Fee
25 May 2018	MF	(Hungary) Ádám Gyurcsó	(Poland) Pogoń Szczecin	€400,000
14 Jun 2018	DF	(Bosnia and Herzegovina) Edin Šehić	(Slovenia) Rudar Velenje	Loan ended
14 Jun 2018	FW	(Croatia) Robert Jandrek	(Croatia) Dugopolje	Loan ended
14 Jun 2018	FW	(Australia) Deni Jurić	(Croatia) Solin	Loan ended
14 Jun 2018	FW	(Australia) Anthony Kalik	(Australia) Sydney FC	Loan ended
15 June 2018	DF	(Croatia) Božo Mikulić	(Italy) Sampdoria Primavera	Free
16 June 2018	FW	(North Macedonia) Mirko Ivanovski	(Croatia) Slaven Belupo	Free
20 June 2018	GK	(Croatia) Tomislav Duka	(Romania) CFR Cluj	Undisclosed
20 June 2018	MF	(Bosnia and Herzegovina) Dino Beširović	(Bosnia and Herzegovina) Radnik Bijeljina	Undisclosed
27 June 2018	DF	(Austria) Stipe Vučur	(Germany) Kaiserslautern	Free
16 July 2018	FW	(Brazil) Jairo	(Greece) PAOK	Free
11 August 2018	MF	(Lebanon) Bassel Jradi	(Norway) Strømsgodset	Undisclosed
14 September 2018	GK	(Croatia) Goran Blažević	(Croatia) Slaven Belupo	Free
12 January 2019	FW	(Albania) Francesco Tahiraj	(Slovenia) Aluminij	€100,000
12 January 2019	FW	(Australia) Anthony Kalik	(Croatia) Rudeš	Loan ended
28 January 2019	FW	(Croatia) Ante Palaversa	(England) Manchester City	Loan
15 February 2019	DF	(Ukraine) Oleksandr Svatok	(Ukraine) Zorya	€350,000
22 May 2019	FW	(Nigeria) Stephen Chinedu	(Croatia) Neretvanac	Free

Total spending: ▼€850.000

=== Out ===
Date	Position	Player	To	Fee
28 May 2018	MF	(Croatia) Mario Tičinović	(Belgium) Lokeren	Loan ended
28 May 2018	DF	(Brazil) Gustavo Carbonieri		Free (released)
28 May 2018	FW	(Portugal) Hugo Almeida	(Portugal) Academica Coimbra	Free
7 June 2018	GK	(Croatia) Dante Stipica	(Bulgaria) CSKA Sofia	Free
15 June 2018	GK	(Croatia) Karlo Letica	(Belgium) Club Brugge	€3,000,000
15 June 2018	MF	(Bosnia and Herzegovina) Zvonimir Kožulj	(Poland) Pogoń Szczecin	€300,000
2 July 2018	GK	(Croatia) Ivo Grbić	(Croatia) Lokomotiva Zagreb	Free
16 July 2018	MF	(Greece) Savvas Gentsoglou	(Cyprus) APOEL	Free
22 July 2018	MF	(Australia) Anthony Kalik	(Croatia) Rudeš	Loan
22 July 2018	MF	(Croatia) Frane Vojković	(Croatia) Rudeš	Loan
25 July 2018	MF	(Croatia) Petar Bosančić	(Croatia) Istra 1961	Free
27 July 2018	MF	(Croatia) Josip Radošević	(Denmark) Brøndby	€800,000
8 August 2018	MF	(Croatia) Toma Bašić	(France) Bordeaux	€3,500,000
24 August 2018	DF	(Croatia) Zoran Nižić	(Russia) Akhmat Grozny	€800,000
28 August 2018	FW	(Croatia) Robert Jandrek	(Croatia) Junak Sinj	Free
31 August 2018	FW	(Hungary) Márkó Futács	(Hungary) MOL Vidi	Free
22 January 2019	MF	(Bosnia and Herzegovina) Edin Šehić	(Ukraine) Vorskla Poltava	Free
24 January 2019	DF	(Albania) Hysen Memolla	(Italy) Salernitana	Free
28 January 2019	MF	(Croatia) Ante Palaversa	(England) Manchester City	€6,300,000
29 January 2019	DF	(Romania) Steliano Filip		Free (released)
31 January 2019	FW	(Italy) Said Ahmed Said	(Portugal) Rio Ave	€500,000
15 February 2019	FW	(Croatia) Franko Kovačević	(Croatia) Rudeš	Loan

Total income: ▲€15,200,000

Total expenditure: ▲€14,000,000

=== Promoted from youth squad ===
Position	Player	Age
FW	(Croatia) Michele Šego	17
MF	(Croatia) Ante Palaversa	18
DF	(Croatia) Domagoj Bradarić	18
MF	(Croatia) Darko Nejašmić	19
MF	(Albania) Emir Sahiti	20
