= Ardian Ismajli =

Albanian footballer (born 1996)

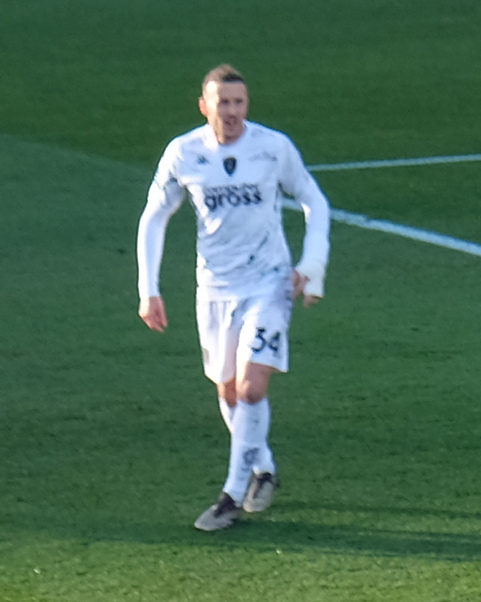
- Ismajli playing for Empoli in 2025

Personal information
- Date of birth: 30 September 1996 (age 30)
- Place of birth: Majac, Podujevë, FR Yugoslavia
- Height: 1.85 m (6 ft 1 in)
- Position: Centre-back

Team information
- Current team: Torino
- Number: 44

Youth career
- 2010–2015: 2 Korriku

Senior career*
| Years | Team | Apps | (Gls) |
| 2015–2016 | 2 Korriku | 0 | (0) |
| 2015–2016 | → Prishtina (loan) | 9 | (0) |
| 2016–2020 | Hajduk Split | 84 | (2) |
| 2017–2018 | → Hajduk Split II | 5 | (0) |
| 2020–2021 | Spezia | 17 | (1) |
| 2021–2025 | Empoli | 100 | (0) |
| 2025– | Torino | 36 | (0) |

International career^{‡}
| 2015 | Albania U21 | 1 | (0) |
| 2017–2018 | Kosovo U21 | 9 | (0) |
| 2018 | Kosovo | 1 | (0) |
| 2018– | Albania | 53 | (3) |
- * Club domestic league appearances and goals as of 21 November 2026 ‡ National team caps and goals as of 15 November 2026

Ardian Ismajli (Albanian pronunciation: [aɾˈdian isˈmajli]; born 30 September 1996) is a professional footballer who plays as a centre-back for Serie A club Torino and the Albania national team.

Ismajli began his career at 2 Korriku and gained first-team experience on loan at Prishtina before moving to Croatian side Hajduk Split, where he made over 80 appearances. He later played in Serie A for Spezia and Empoli, reaching 100 league appearances with the latter, before joining Torino in 2025.

Born in Kosovo, he initially represented his country of birth at youth and senior level before switching allegiance to the Albania national team, where he has been a frequent starter in major qualifying campaigns and was selected for the UEFA Euro 2024 finals.

== Club career ==
=== Early career ===
Ismajli came through the youth system of First Football League of Kosovo side 2 Korriku in Pristina. As a teenager, Ismajli attracted interest from German clubs including Paderborn and Arminia Bielefeld, going on trial with the former after resolving initial visa issues, eventually spending two weeks with the club, and later training with the latter, where he impressed but did not remain in Germany.

He made his senior debut during the second half of the 2013–14 season, and in mid-2015 he was loaned to Kosovo Superleague club Prishtina, where he gained his first top-flight experience.

=== Hajduk Split ===
In February 2016, Ismajli signed a three-and-a-half-year contract with Croatian First League club Hajduk Split following a trial. He initially featured for Hajduk Split II in the 3. HNL. On 14 May 2016, he made his debut for the first team against Zagreb on the final matchday of the season, playing the full 90 minutes in a 3–2 win and was cautioned in the 48th minute.

In the 2016–17 season, Ismajli became a regular player under coach Marijan Pušnik. In the first match of the season, a 2016–17 UEFA Europa League second qualifying round match against Politehnica Iași in Romania, he was included in the matchday squad but did not feature. He started the next match, a 2–0 league win over newly promoted Cibalia, playing as a right-back. On 18 August 2016, Ismajli made his UEFA Europa League debut in a 2–1 defeat against Maccabi Tel Aviv at Netanya Stadium in the play-off round, starting the match. Three days later, on 21 August 2016, he scored his first goal for Hajduk in a 4–2 defeat against Rijeka at Poljud Stadium.

By the end of the 2018–19 season, Ismajli had been named in the "Team of the Week" on six occasions, reflecting his consistent performances where he was noted for his accurate passing, ability to contribute in attack, strength in duels, and solid defensive displays, establishing himself as a key first-team player as the club finished fourth in the league.

On 22 November 2019, Ismajli scored an own goal in a 1–1 draw against Dinamo Zagreb in the Croatian derby, with the goal coming from a deflection following a corner kick.

=== Spezia Calcio ===
In September 2020, Ismajli signed a three-year deal with Italian club Spezia. He joined the club ahead of their first-ever season in the Serie A. On 18 April 2021, he scored his first goal in a 4–1 away defeat against Bologna.

=== Empoli ===
On 9 August 2021, Ismajli joined fellow Italian club Empoli. At the end of the 2024–25 season, following the club's relegation to Serie B, he announced his departure after making 100 appearances in Serie A.

=== Torino ===
On 8 July 2025, Ismajli signed a two-season contract with Torino. He made his debut on 14 September 2025 in the third game week of the 2025–26 season, playing the full match and being a protagonist in a 1–0 away victory against Roma.

== International career ==
=== Kosovo ===
Ismajli was part of the Kosovo under-21 team and made his debut in June 2017 during the 2019 UEFA European Under-21 Championship qualification, making nine appearances, all as a starter playing the full 90 minutes. Kosovo recorded three wins and three draws during the campaign, finishing second from bottom in a closely contested group.

On 2 October 2016, Ismajli received a call-up from Kosovo for the 2018 FIFA World Cup qualification matches against Croatia and Ukraine. However, a day before joining the national team, he suffered an injury during a Croatian derby match between his team Hajduk Split and Dinamo Zagreb. On 29 May 2018, Ismajli made his debut for Kosovo in a friendly match against Albania, starting the match and playing the full 90 minutes in a 3–0 win.

=== Albania ===
After obtaining Albanian citizenship in October 2018, Ismajli switched his international allegiance to Albania and received his first call-up in November 2018 for the 2018–19 UEFA Nations League closing match against Scotland and a friendly match against Wales. He made his debut on 17 November 2018, starting and playing 64 minutes in a 4–0 loss against Scotland. He then established himself as a regular starter during the UEFA Euro 2020 qualifying campaign under manager Edoardo Reja, being deployed primarily in a three-man defence and featuring both as a central and right-sided centre-back. He was a near ever-present throughout the campaign, missing only minimal playing time, as Albania won 13 points and finished fourth in Group H.

On 15 November 2020, Ismajli scored his first international goal in a 3–1 win against Kazakhstan in the 2020–21 UEFA Nations League C. Three days later, Ismajli featured in Albania's 3–2 win over Belarus in the final matchday of the League C, helping the team secure promotion to League B. During the 2022 FIFA World Cup qualification, Ismajli remained a regular member of the team, making seven appearances, all as a starter playing the full 90 minutes. Albania recorded six wins without conceding a goal and collected 18 points, narrowly missing out on a play-off spot. On 16 November 2022, Ismajli scored his second international goal in a 3–1 home friendly defeat against Italy, opening the scoring in the 16th minute.

He was a regular starter during the UEFA Euro 2024 qualifying campaign under manager Sylvinho, making six appearances in Group E, playing the full 90 minutes in each match. On 17 November 2023, after a 1–1 draw against Moldova on the penultimate matchday, Albania mathematically secured qualification for the final tournament of a European Championship for only the second time in its history. Albania eventually finished top of the group for the first time in its history with 15 points, level with the Czech Republic, but ahead on head-to-head results. He was named in Albania's 26-man squad for the final tournament in June 2024 in Germany. During Group B, Ismajli did not make any appearances and remained an unused substitute in all three matches, as Albania faced Italy, Croatia and Spain, with head coach Sylvinho preferring Arlind Ajeti to partner captain Berat Gjimshiti in central defence. Albania collected only 1 point and were eliminated in the group stage.

During the 2024–25 UEFA Nations League B, Ismajli was ever-present, playing every minute of Albania's matches, while captain Berat Gjimshiti missed the entire campaign due to persistent back-to-back injuries. On 7 September 2024, Albania won 2–1 away the opening match against Ukraine, with Ismajli scoring a goal and excelling defensively; following this performance, he was named in the Team of the Week for the first round of the competition. The team subsequently suffered two narrow 0–1 defeats against Georgia and the Czech Republic without scoring and following these results, coach Sylvinho benched captain Elseid Hysaj and appointed Ismajli as captain for the remainder of the campaign. Albania then immediately won 1–0 against Georgia, while drew 1–1 with the Czech Republic, but Albania was ultimately eliminated after a final loss to Ukraine, finishing level on points with Georgia but one point behind Ukraine. During the 2026 FIFA World Cup qualification campaign, Ismajli made only two appearances in Group K, amid ongoing competition for a starting position in central defence with Arlind Ajeti. Albania secured qualification to the play-offs with one match remaining in the group. In the play-off semi-final match on 26 March 2026 against Poland, Ismajli entered the field in the 18th minute as a substitute following an injury to Ajeti.

== Career statistics ==
=== Club ===
As of match played 21 November 2026

Appearances and goals by club, season and competition
| Club | Season | League | | | Cup | | Europe (Note: Including continental competitions, such as UEFA Champions League and UEFA Europa League) | | Total | | | | | | | | | | |
| Club | Season | Division | Apps | Goals | Apps | Goals | Apps | Goals | Apps | Goals | | | | | | | | | |
|---|---|---|---|---|---|---|---|---|---|---|---|---|---|---|---|---|---|---|---|
| 2 Korriku | 2014–15 | First League of Kosovo | | | | | — | | | | | | | | | | | | |
| Prishtina (loan) | 2015–16 | Kosovo Superleague | 9 | 0 | 0 | 0 | — | | 9 | 0 | | | | | | | | | |
| Hajduk Split | 2015–16 | Croatian First League | 1 | 0 | 0 | 0 | 0 | 0 | 1 | 0 | | | | | | | | | |
| Hajduk Split | 2016–17 | Croatian First League | 18 | 1 | 0 | 0 | 2 | 0 | 20 | 1 | | | | | | | | | |
| Hajduk Split | 2017–18 | Croatian First League | 14 | 0 | 2 | 0 | 0 | 0 | 16 | 0 | | | | | | | | | |
| Hajduk Split | 2018–19 | Croatian First League | 20 | 1 | 3 | 0 | 0 | 0 | 23 | 1 | | | | | | | | | |
| Hajduk Split | 2019–20 | Croatian First League | 28 | 0 | 1 | 0 | 1 | 0 | 30 | 0 | | | | | | | | | |
| Hajduk Split | 2020–21 | Croatian First League | 3 | 0 | 0 | 0 | 0 | 0 | 3 | 0 | | | | | | | | | |
| Hajduk Split | Total | | 84 | 2 | 6 | 0 | 3 | 0 | 93 | 2 | | | | | | | | | |
| Hajduk Split II | 2017–18 | Croatian Second League | 3 | 0 | — | | — | | 3 | 0 | | | | | | | | | |
| Hajduk Split II | 2018–19 | Croatian Second League | 2 | 0 | — | | — | | 2 | 0 | | | | | | | | | |
| Hajduk Split II | Total | | 5 | 0 | — | | — | | 5 | 0 | | | | | | | | | |
| Spezia | 2020–21 | Serie A | 17 | 1 | 4 | 0 | — | | 21 | 1 | | | | | | | | | |
| Empoli | 2021–22 | Serie A | 20 | 0 | 2 | 0 | — | | 22 | 0 | | | | | | | | | |
| Empoli | 2022–23 | Serie A | 25 | 0 | 1 | 0 | — | | 26 | 0 | | | | | | | | | |
| Empoli | 2023–24 | Serie A | 26 | 0 | 1 | 0 | — | | 27 | 0 | | | | | | | | | |
| Empoli | 2024–25 | Serie A | 29 | 0 | 2 | 0 | — | | 31 | 0 | | | | | | | | | |
| Empoli | Total | | 100 | 0 | 6 | 0 | — | | 106 | 0 | | | | | | | | | |
| Torino | 2025–26 | Serie A | 25 | 0 | 2 | 0 | — | | 27 | 0 | 2026–27 | Serie A | 11 | 0 | 2 | 0 | — | 13 | 0 |
| Torino | Total | | 36 | 0 | 4 | 0 | — | | 40 | 0 | | | | | | | | | |
| Torino | Career total | | | 256 | 3 | 19 | 0 | 3 | 0 | 279 | 3 | | | | | | | | |

=== International ===
As of match played 15 November 2026

Appearances and goals by national team and year
| National team | Year | Apps | Goals |
|---|---|---|---|
| Kosovo | 2018 | 1 | 0 |
| Total | | 1 | 0 |
| Albania | 2018 | 2 | 0 |
| Albania | 2019 | 9 | 0 |
| Albania | 2020 | 3 | 1 |
| Albania | 2021 | 9 | 0 |
| Albania | 2022 | 7 | 1 |
| Albania | 2023 | 6 | 0 |
| Albania | 2024 | 8 | 1 |
| Albania | 2025 | 2 | 0 |
| Albania | 2026 | 7 | 0 |
| Total | | 53 | 3 |

Scores and results list Albania's goal tally first, score column indicates score after each Ismajli goal.

List of international goals scored by Ardian Ismajli
| No. | Date | Venue | Opponent | Score | Result | Competition |
|---|---|---|---|---|---|---|
| 1 | 15 November 2020 | Arena Kombëtare, Tirana, Albania | Kazakhstan | 2–0 | 3–1 | 2020–21 UEFA Nations League C |
| 2 | 16 November 2022 | Arena Kombëtare, Tirana, Albania | Italy | 1–0 | 1–3 | Friendly |
| 3 | 7 September 2024 | Stadion Letná, Prague, Czech Republic | Ukraine | 1–1 | 2–1 | 2024–25 UEFA Nations League |
