= Nicholas Llanos =

Croatian footballer

Personal information
- Full name: Nicholas Rafael Llanos Lohinski
- Date of birth: 10 February 1996 (age 30)
- Place of birth: Rijeka, Croatia
- Height: 1.80 m (5 ft 11 in)
- Position: Midfielder

Team information
- Current team: Bridge United
- Number: 12

Youth career
- 2006–2008: Hajduk Split
- 2008–2009: Omladinac Vranjic
- 2010–2012: Rijeka
- 2012–2013: Mune
- 2013–2014: Opatija
- 2014–2015: Hajduk Split

Senior career*
| Years | Team | Apps | (Gls) |
| 2015–2017 | Hajduk Split II | 23 | (19) |
| 2017 | Split | 16 | (17) |
| 2018–2019 | Osijek | 9 | (2) |
| 2018 | → Dugopolje (loan) | 8 | (5) |
| 2018–2019 | → Zadar (loan) | 12 | (6) |
| 2019 | Croatia Zmijavci | 13 | (2) |
| 2020–2021 | Solin | 23 | (3) |
| 2021–2023 | Široki Brijeg | 19 | (1) |
| 2022 | → Croatia Zmijavci (loan) | 2 | (1) |
| 2023 | Solin | 1 | (0) |
| 2023–2024 | Orkan Dugi Rat | 2 | (0) |
- * Club domestic league appearances and goals

Nicholas Rafael Llanos Lohinski (born 10 February 1996) is a Croatian-Colombian footballer who plays as a midfielder for Irish Club Bridge United

== Career ==
=== Club career ===
As a youth player, Llanos joined the youth academy of Croatian top flight side Hajduk after trialing for the youth academy of Vitesse in the Netherlands and receiving interest from the youth academies of Spanish La Liga club Barcelona, Inter in the Italian Serie A, and English Premier League team Chelsea. After that, he signed a 3-year deal with América de Cali from Colombia but that deal was broken by team's owner Tulio Gómez. In 2017, he signed for Croatian third division outfit RNK Split.

In 2018, Llanos signed for Osijek in the Croatian top flight. Before the second half of 2018–19, he was sent on loan to Croatian second division side Zadar. In 2021, he signed for Široki Brijeg in Bosnia and Herzegovina. On 25 July 2021, Llanos debuted for Široki Brijeg during a 1–1 draw with Rudar (Prijedor). On 17 October 2021, he scored his first goal for Široki Brijeg during a 2–1 win over Rudar Prijedor.

=== International career ===
Llanos is eligible to represent Colombia internationally through his father.
