= Siniša Zlatković =

Serbian footballer (born 1924)

Personal information
- Full name: Siniša Zlatković
- Date of birth: 16 April 1934
- Place of birth: Smederevo, Kingdom of SCS
- Position: Defender

Senior career*
Years	Team	Apps	(Gls)
1947–1950	Naša Krila Zemun	22	(8)
1951–1955	Red Star Belgrade	72	(5)
- * Club domestic league appearances and goals

Siniša Zlatković (Serbian Cyrillic: Синиша Златковић, born 16 April 1934, date of death unknown) was a Serbian football defender who was a member of the Yugoslavia national team at the 1950 FIFA World Cup. However, he never earned a cap for his country. He also played for Red Star Belgrade. Zlatković is deceased.
