= FK Naša Krila Zemun =

Yugoslavian football club

FK Naša Krila Zemun (Serbian Cyrillic: Тим Југословенског ратног ваздухопловства "Наша крила", lit. 'Yugoslav Air Force Team "Our Wings"') was a short-lived Yugoslav football club established in 1947 as a section of the eponymous sports society affiliated with the Yugoslav Air Force (JRV). Based in Zemun, SR Serbia, the club acted as the Air Force's official team, and relied on players serving their mandatory military service with the branch, also headquartered at Zemun.

Despite being active for only a few years, before being disbanded in 1950, the club was very successful in domestic football during its existence. In their first competitive season in 1947–48 they won promotion to Yugoslavia's top league, and went on to finish fifth in the 1948–49 and sixth in 1950. They also reached two Yugoslav Cup finals (1947, 1949) and one semi-final (1948).

== History ==
The club was formed by the Yugoslav Air Force soon after the end of World War II. The club's name, which translates from Serbo-Croatian as "Our Wings", was inspired by the pre-war magazine of the same title published by the Yugoslav Royal Aero Club. In April 1948, during the existence of the sports club, the civilian aeronautical association was re-established as the Aeronautical Union of Yugoslavia (VSJ), which also re-launched the magazine.

The club's logo featured an eagle with wings spread positioned atop the five-torch emblem of Yugoslavia, with a laurel wreath in the background and a red five-pointed star on top. During its existence, the club featured players who were serving their mandatory military service in the Air Force—some of these had already been established professional footballers before 1945, while others were young prospects who have never played professional football before. The club used the Air Force's own ground in Zemun to host matches, although they occasionally hosted some of their bigger games at larger stadiums in Belgrade.

=== 1947–48 ===
Since its establishment in mid-1947, Naša Krila competed in the Yugoslav league system. Just like a similar club formed around the same time by the Yugoslav Navy (JRM), NK Mornar Split, the club first entered the Yugoslav second-tier league in the 1947–48 season. Initially the team was led by player-manager Zvonko Monsider, an accomplished goalkeeper formerly of HŠK Concordia, now "borrowed" from Dinamo Zagreb in the first half-season, the club finished third, level on points with Budućnost from Titograd and Sloga from Novi Sad. All three earned promotion to the First Federal League.

Still as a second-level side, the club also entered the inaugural edition of the Marshal Tito Cup, Yugoslavia's national cup competition, which was played as a short tournament during November 1947. In the quarter-final they beat Spartak Subotica to qualify for the final-four stage played over two days at Stadion Avala in Belgrade. Naša Krila finished as runners-up, losing the final 0–2 to Partizan, the multi-sports club affiliated with the Yugoslav People's Army (JNA), i.e. the country's armed forces.

=== 1949–50 ===
In the next 1948–49 season, the first one in the national top league, the club finished 5h, behind only the "Big Four" clubs of Yugoslav football (Partizan, Red Star, Hajduk Split, Dinamo Zagreb). During the 1948 Marshal Tito Cup season in November Naša Krila beat Budućnost to reach the final-four stage in Belgrade again. This time they lost the semi-final to Red Star 3–4, and then also lost the third-place match to Dinamo Zagreb 1–5.

In the second half of 1949 there were no championship games, as the national league was rescheduled to switch to a calendar-year cycle. However, the third edition of the Marshal Tito Cup was played in November 1949. Naša Krila beat Budućnost again in the semi-final, to reach their second domestic cup final, and the first final staged at the newly built Stadion JNA in Belgrade. They finished as runners-up again, after a 2–3 defeat to Red Star.

In the 1950 season, played over 18 rounds from March to November (including a three-month break during the 1950 FIFA World Cup in Brazil) Naša Krila finished the season in 6th place, with their last match being a 2–1 home win against Lokomotiva on 12 November 1950.

The club was dissolved shortly thereafter. By the first round of the next edition of the Marshal Tito Cup, played two weeks later, on 26 November, the club had already been de-registered. The scheduled cup games, which were supposed to involve Naša Krila and their reserve side Naša Krila II, were registered as 3–0 forfeits.

=== Players ===
The club's best scorer in all three of its league seasons was Vladimir Pečenčić (19 goals in 1946–47, 11 goals in 1947–48 and 6 goals in 1950). During the 1950 summer break, the only Naša Krila player called up by Yugoslavia manager Milorad Arsenijević for the World Cup in Brazil was defender Siniša Zlatković. He spent the tournament as an unused substitute in all of Yugoslavia's three matches. Although he later played for five more seasons at Red Star he was never actually capped for the national team. No other Naša Krila player was called up for Yugoslavia.

== Notable teams ==
The team that played the cup final in 1947:

- Players: Živko Popadić, Miroslav Lazić, Ljubiša Filipović (c), Lenko Grčić, Milan Brnjevarac, Antun Lokošek, Aleksandar Panić, Vladimir Pečenčić, Siniša Zlatković, Vasilije Damnjanović, Franc Borovic.
- Head coach: Negoslav Radosavljević

The team that played the cup final in 1949:

- Players: Živko Popadić, Ljubiša Filipović (c), Miroslav Jovanović, Milan Kobe, Ivan Zvekanović, Vladimir Adamović, Aleksandar Panić, Lenko Grčić, Milutin Popović, Siniša Zlatković, Franc Borovic.
- Manager: Negoslav Radosavljević
