= Milan Kobe =

Yugoslav and Croatian footballer and manager

Personal information
- Full name: Milan Kobe
- Date of birth: 1926
- Place of birth: Zagreb, Kingdom of Yugoslavia
- Date of death: 1966 (aged 39–40)
- Place of death: Osijek, SFR Yugoslavia
- Position: Midfielder

Senior career*
Years	Team	Apps	(Gls)
1944–1945	HAŠK Zagreb		
1948–1949	Naša Krila Zemun	10	(0)
1950–1951	Borac Zagreb	19	(2)
1952–1955	Lokomotiva Zagreb	51	(6)
1955–1958	Proleter Osijek		

Managerial career
- Proleter Osijek (youth)
- Sloga Đurđenovci
- TIKO Osijek
- * Club domestic league appearances and goals

Milan Kobe (1926–1966) was a Croatian and Yugoslav football player and manager.

== Career ==
Born in Zagreb in 1926, Kobe was unfortunate to see the Second World War take much of his teenage years. He started playing in 1944 when the war was approaching its end, when he joined one of Zagreb´s major clubs, HAŠK.

When the war was over, Yugoslavia changed from monarchy to become a communist regime. Most of the Serbian pro-monarchic clubs, just as Croatian pro-Ustashe ones, were disbanded, and the new authorities formed numerous new clubs to replace them. One of them was FK Naša Krila Zemun, a club formed by the Yugoslav Air Force and based in Zemun where the bulk of the Yugoslav military aviation industry and its major bases were located. Solving this way the mandatory army conscription, Kobe moved from Zagreb to Zemun, located just in the outskirts of capital Belgrade.

Surprisingly, The Aviators formed a strong team. Kobe joined in 1948, when the club had achieved promotion to the Yugoslav First League and reached the Yugoslav Cup final, all in their previous season. In his first season at Naša Krila, Kobe and his teammates finished 5th in the 1948–49 Yugoslav First League. However, even more impressive was that Naša Krila reached their second cup final in three years of existence, and, although this time Kobe was in the team, they ended losing the final again, this time against Red Star.

Naša Krila, however, suffered the destiny of the Zemun's military aircraft industry, which the authorities decided to shot down and move to Mostar, in southern SR Bosnia and Herzegovina, where the factories were reopened as SOKO and begin production in 1950, the year Naša krila played its last season before ceasing to exist.

In 1950 all the players of Naša Krila were released, and Kobe returned to Zagreb to join Borac Zagreb, which later became NK Zagreb, and continued to play national top-level football. After two seasons, he moved to another local top-flight side, NK Lokomotiva, where he played until 1955.

With a status of an already experienced player, he moved to Osijek, and joined an ambitious Yugoslav Second League side, NK Osijek, known back then as NK Proleter Osijek. His spent three seasons at Osijek as a player, and after retirement stayed on at the club as a youth coach. He also later had managing stints at lower-tier local teams such as Sloga Đurđenovci and TIKO Osijek.

He stayed in Osijek for the rest of his life, and died there in 1966.
