= Antun Lokošek =

Croatian footballer

Personal information
- Date of birth: 2 January 1920
- Place of birth: Celje, Kingdom of SCS
- Date of death: 24 December 1994 (aged 74)
- Place of death: Split, Croatia
- Positions: Forward; midfielder

Senior career*
Years	Team	Apps	(Gls)
1937–194x	Slavija Osijek		
194x–1943	Slavija Varaždin		
1943–1944	Građanski Zagreb	9	(6)
1946–1947	Hajduk Split	12	(3)
1947–1948	Naša Krila Zemun		
1948–1950	Lokomotiva Zagreb		
195x–1953	Kvarner Rijeka		

International career
1944	Independent State of Croatia	1	(1)

Managerial career
- 1953–1954: Kvarner Rijeka
- Orkan Dugi Rat
- Jugovinil Kaštel Gomilica
- * Club domestic league appearances and goals

Antun Lokošek (Croatian pronunciation: [ǎntuːn lǒkoʃek]; 2 January 1920—24 December 1994) was a Croatian footballer who played for several clubs in Yugoslavia.

== Playing career ==
=== Club ===
Born in Celje, he played with Slavija Osijek and NK Slavija before joining Građanski Zagreb in 1943. He was first registered for Slavija Osijek at March 1937. At the end of World War II he moved to Hajduk Split. In 1947 he played the Yugoslav Cup final with FK Naša Krila Zemun. Later between 1948 and 1950 he played with NK Lokomotiva. After retiring, he became a coach, and coached NK Orkan and NK Jugovinil. He died in Split in 1994.

In 1946 he joined HNK Hajduk Split Later, he played with NK Lokomotiva and HNK Rijeka, known as Kvarner back then, where he finished his career in 1953.

=== International ===
In 1944, he played for the short lived (1939–1944) national team of the Independent State of Croatia, a World War II-era puppet state of Nazi Germany, recording his single cap, and also scoring, in a 7–3 victory against Slovakia.

== Managerial career ==
He graduated in the coaching academy in Zagreb, and became coach of Kvarner in season 1953–54, immediately after retiring from his playing career. Then he moved to Split and coached NK Orkan Dugi Rat and Jugovinil Kaštel Gomilica.
