= Josip Juranović =

Croatian footballer (born 1995)

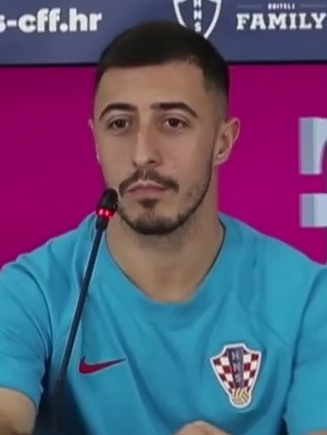
- Juranović with Croatia in 2022

Personal information
- Full name: Josip Juranović
- Date of birth: 16 August 1995 (age 31)
- Place of birth: Zagreb, Croatia
- Height: 1.73 m (5 ft 8 in)
- Positions: Right-back; right wing-back

Team information
- Current team: Union Berlin
- Number: 18

Youth career
- 2004–2011: Dubrava
- 2011: Croatia Sesvete
- 2011–2013: Dubrava

Senior career*
Years	Team	Apps	(Gls)
2013–2015	Dubrava	36	(14)
2015–2020	Hajduk Split	136	(3)
2020–2021	Legia Warsaw	28	(1)
2021–2023	Celtic	36	(4)
2023–	Union Berlin	64	(3)

International career^{‡}
2017–	Croatia	40	(0)
Medal record
Men's football
Representing Croatia
FIFA World Cup
Third place	2022 Qatar
UEFA Nations League
Runner-up	2023 Netherlands
- * Club domestic league appearances and goals as of 22:26, 11 September 2026 (UTC) ‡ National team caps and goals as of 23:14, 6 June 2025 (UTC)

Josip Juranović (Croatian pronunciation: [jǒsip jurǎːnoʋitɕ]; born 16 August 1995) is a Croatian professional footballer who plays as a right-back or right wing-back for Bundesliga club Union Berlin and the Croatia national team.

== Club career ==
Born in Zagreb, Croatia, Juranović went through the ranks of the third-tier Dubrava, apart from a two-month stint at the nearby NK Croatia Sesvete academy. Making his third-level senior debut in the 2012–13 season, he first drew attention to himself by winning the Croatian leg of the Nike Chance competition for amateur players in early 2014, earning the right to vie for a spot in the Nike Academy team. Not making the five-person cut, however, he returned to his club. His club performances remained strong, and, touted by some media as the best player of the autumn leg of the 2014–15 Treća HNL Zapad, he drew the attention of HNK Hajduk Split.

After signing a three-and-a-half-year contract with Hajduk Split in early 2015, he initially joined their third-tier B team, but was moved to the first team in April 2015 by the new manager Goran Vučević, and he made his Prva HNL debut in a 2–1 home loss against Rijeka.

In June 2018, Juranović was selected in the Prva HNL team of the season for his performances during the 2017–18 season.

=== Legia Warsaw ===
On 31 July 2020, he signed a three-year contract with the Polish club Legia Warszawa. He scored the first goal for Legia on October 21, 2020, in a 2–1 win against Śląsk Wrocław. He won the Ekstraklasa at the end of his only season at the club.

=== Celtic ===
Juranović signed for Scottish Premiership side Celtic in August 2021 from Legia Warsaw on a five-year deal. The transfer fee was a reported £2.5 million. Despite playing the majority of his professional career as a right-back, Juranovic would start as a left-back during his introductory stage at Celtic, including his debut against rivals Rangers at Ibrox. He would assume the role of Celtic's penalty taker in his first season, notably scoring against Real Betis, Bayer Leverkusen and three other times in the league. In December, he was a member of Celtic's League Cup victory against Hibernian. His contributions to Celtic's title-winning defence would see him earn a spot in the PFA Scotland Team of the Year.

On 6 September 2022, Juranović played his first UEFA Champions League group stage match in a 3–0 home defeat against Real Madrid at Celtic Park.

While on international duty with the Croatia national team, Juranović was strongly linked to a move away from Celtic during the 2022 FIFA World Cup with Barcelona, Atlético Madrid, Chelsea and being credited with interest ahead of the January transfer window. Speculation heightened after Celtic signed Canadian international Alistair Johnston from Major League Soccer side CF Montréal, who was seen as Juranović's potential replacement at right-back.

=== Union Berlin ===
On 22 January 2023, Juranović signed for Bundesliga side Union Berlin for £7.5 million plus additional add-ons.

== International career ==
On 14 January 2017, Juranović debuted for the Croatian senior squad. in the third-place playoff of 2017 China Cup against China, Croatia lost 5–4 on penalties after a goalless draw.

On 17 May 2021, Juranović was selected in Croatia's 26-man squad for the UEFA Euro 2020. He played two games for the team in the tournament, a 3–1 victory against Scotland in the group stage and a 5–3 loss against Spain in the Round of 16.

On 9 November 2022, Juranović was selected in Croatia's 26-man squad for the 2022 FIFA World Cup. They were eliminated in the semi-final against Argentina and played their last game on 17 December in a 2–1 victory against Morocco; finishing in third place.

== Personal life ==
Juranović is from the Dubrava area in the capital of Zagreb. He went to Mato Lovrak elementary school in Klaka, Dubrava.

== Career statistics ==
=== Club ===
As of match played 11 September 2026

Appearances and goals by club, season and competition
Club	Season	League			National cup (Note: Includes Croatian Cup, Polish Cup, Scottish Cup, DFB-Pokal)		League cup (Note: Includes Scottish League Cup)		Europe		Other		Total	
Club	Season	Division	Apps	Goals	Apps	Goals	Apps	Goals	Apps	Goals	Apps	Goals	Apps	Goals
Hajduk Split	2014–15	Prva HNL	6	0	1	0	—		—		—		7	0
Hajduk Split	2015–16	Prva HNL	31	1	4	0	—		3 (Note: Appearance(s) in UEFA Europa League)	0	—		38	1
Hajduk Split	2016–17	Prva HNL	18	0	3	0	—		4	0	—		25	0
Hajduk Split	2017–18	Prva HNL	27	0	2	0	—		4	0	—		33	0
Hajduk Split	2018–19	Prva HNL	22	0	2	0	—		4	0	—		28	0
Hajduk Split	2019–20	Prva HNL	32	2	1	0	—		1	0	—		34	2
Hajduk Split	Total		136	3	13	0	—		16	0	—		165	3
Legia Warsaw	2020–21	Ekstraklasa	26	1	3	0	—		2	0	1 (Note: Appearance in Polish Super Cup)	0	32	1
Legia Warsaw	2021–22	Ekstraklasa	2	0	—		—		6 (Note: Five appearances in UEFA Champions League, one appearance and one goal in UEFA Europa League)	1	1	0	9	1
Legia Warsaw	Total		28	1	3	0	—		8	1	2	0	41	2
Celtic	2021–22	Scottish Premiership	26	3	2	0	3	0	4 (Note: Three appearances and two goals in UEFA Europa League, one appearance in UEFA Europa Conference League)	2	—		35	5
Celtic	2022–23	Scottish Premiership	10	1	0	0	2	0	6 (Note: Appearances in UEFA Champions League)	0	—		18	1
Celtic	Total		36	4	2	0	5	0	10	2	—		53	6
Union Berlin	2022–23	Bundesliga	12	2	2	0	—		4	2	—		18	4
Union Berlin	2023–24	Bundesliga	21	0	1	0	—		5	0	—		27	0
Union Berlin	2024–25	Bundesliga	17	0	0	0	—		—		—		17	0
Union Berlin	2025–26	Bundesliga	11	1	0	0	—		—		—		11	1
Union Berlin	2026–27	Bundesliga	3	0	1	0	—		—		—		4	0
Union Berlin	Total		64	3	4	0	—		9	2	—		77	5
Career total			264	11	22	0	5	0	43	5	2	0	336	16

=== International ===
As of match played 6 June 2025

Appearances and goals by national team and year
National team	Year	Apps	Goals
Croatia	2017	1	0
Croatia	2018	0	0
Croatia	2019	1	0
Croatia	2020	3	0
Croatia	2021	10	0
Croatia	2022	12	0
Croatia	2023	7	0
Croatia	2024	5	0
Croatia	2025	1	0
Total		40	0

== Honours ==
Legia Warsaw

- Ekstraklasa: 2020–21

Celtic

- Scottish Premiership: 2021–22
- Scottish League Cup: 2021–22

Croatia

- FIFA World Cup third place: 2022
- UEFA Nations League runner-up: 2022–23

Individual

- Prva HNL Team of the Season: 2017–18
- PFA Scotland Team of the Year (Premiership): 2021–22
