= Tonči Žilić =

Croatian footballer

Personal information
- Date of birth: 26 February 1975 (age 51)
- Place of birth: Split, SFR Yugoslavia
- Height: 1.82 m (5 ft 11 1/2 in)
- Position: Defender

Youth career
- Orkan Dugi Rat
- 1992–1993: Primorac Stobreč

Senior career*
| Years | Team | Apps | (Gls) |
| 1993 | Primorac Stobreč | | |
| 1994–1996 | Šibenik | 59 | (5) |
| 1996–1997 | Osijek | 20 | (2) |
| 1997–1998 | Castel di Sangro | 11 | (1) |
| 1998–2000 | Verona | 8 | (0) |
| 1999–2000 | → Fermana (loan) | 0 | (0) |
| 2000–2001 | Siena | 12 | (0) |
| 2002–2003 | Šibenik | 28 | (0) |
| 2003–2004 | Zagreb | 36 | (1) |
| 2004–2007 | Hajduk Split | 43 | (1) |
| 2008 | Solin | 14 | (0) |
| 2009–2010 | Drava | 35 | (0) |
| 2010–2011 | Orkan Dugi Rat | | |
| 2011 | Omiš | 8 | (0) |

International career
| 1996–1997 | Croatia U21 | 4 | (1) |
- * Club domestic league appearances and goals

Tonči Žilić (born 26 February 1975) is a retired Croatian football player. He spent most of his career playing in the Croatian Prva HNL, but also a spell in Italy where he played three seasons in Serie B.

== Career ==
Born in Split, Žilić began playing football for local side NK Orkan Dugi Rat, debuting early for the senior team before moving to Primorac Stobreč, at 17 and a half years of age. He joined HNK Šibenik and NK Osijek before leaving for Italy in December 1997.

Žilić joined Serie B side A.S.D. Castel di Sangro Calcio. After one season, he left and would play in Serie B for Hellas Verona F.C. and A.C. Siena.

In 2002, Žilić returned to Croatia where he would spend the next six seasons playing in the Prva HNL with Šibenik, NK Zagreb and Hajduk Split. After spending the 2007–2008 season outside the Hajduk first team, training with the junior team, he went to the Druga HNL team NK Solin, where he stayed until January 2009, when he signed for the Slovenian team Drava Ptuj. After a year and a half there, he returned to his hometown club, the fourth-tier NK Orkan, serving both as a player and a youth team coach. In 2011, he joined the Treća HNL Jug side NK Omiš.

Žilić made four appearances for the Croatia national under-21 football team.
