= Kosovo national youth football team =

The Kosovo national youth football teams are a group of four teams that represents Kosovo in association football at various specific age levels, ranging from under-15 to under-21. All of the teams are controlled by Football Federation of Kosovo, the governing body for football in Kosovo.

The four teams are the following:

- Kosovo national under-21 football team
- Kosovo national under-19 football team
- Kosovo national under-17 football team
- Kosovo national under-15 football team
