= Božo Mikulić =

Croatian footballer (born 1997)

Personal information
- Date of birth: 29 January 1997 (age 29)
- Place of birth: Split, Croatia
- Height: 1.94 m (6 ft 4 in)
- Position: Centre-back

Team information
- Current team: St Johnstone
- Number: 6

Youth career
- 2006–2008: Omladinac Vranjic
- 2008–2015: RNK Split
- 2017–2018: Sampdoria

Senior career*
Years	Team	Apps	(Gls)
2016–2017	RNK Split	27	(0)
2016	→ Imotski (loan)	13	(1)
2017–2018	Sampdoria	0	(0)
2018–2021	Hajduk Split	8	(0)
2018–2021	Hajduk Split II	19	(0)
2019	→ Slaven Belupo (loan)	19	(2)
2021–2022	ACR Messina	12	(0)
2022–2023	Auda	49	(0)
2024	Partizani Tirana	4	(0)
2024–	St Johnstone	15	(2)

International career
2014–2015	Croatia U18	4	(0)
2014–2015	Croatia U19	16	(0)
- * Club domestic league appearances and goals as of 4 May 2026

Božo Mikulić (Croatian pronunciation: [bǒːʒo mîkulitɕ]; born 29 January 1997) is a Croatian professional footballer who plays for Scottish Premiership club St Johnstone.

== Career ==
Apart from his initial two years at NK Omladinac Vranjic, Mikulić spent his entire youth career in RNK Split, becoming a youth international in 2014. As the captain of Split's U19 team, who also handled his team's set-pieces, he was loaned out to the second-tier team NK Imotski where he scored on his senior debut, a 1–1 away draw with NK Dugopolje. In the summer of 2016, he returned to RNK Split and made his Prva HNL debut.

On 31 August 2017, Mikulić signed for Italian club U.C. Sampdoria on a permanent deal.

On 15 June 2018, Mikulić moved to Croatian club Hajduk Split. He made his league debut for the club on 5 August 2018 in a 1–1 home draw with Lokomotiva Zagreb. On 7 August 2019, he joined Slaven Belupo on a season-long loan deal.

On 24 August 2021, he returned to Italy and signed a two-year contract with Serie C club ACR Messina.

On 17 February 2022, Mikulić moved to Auda, newly promoted to Latvian Higher League.

On 15 October 2024, Mikulić agreed to join Scottish Premiership club St Johnstone on a contract until the end of the season, subject to a work permit being granted.

== Honours ==
St Johnstone

- Scottish Championship: 2025–26
