= NK Orkan Dugi Rat =

Croatian football club

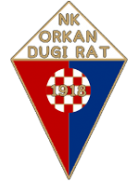
- Full name: Nogometni klub Orkan Dugi Rat
- Founded: 1918; 107 years ago
- Ground: ŠRC Dalmacija
- Capacity: 3,000
- Chairman: Marin Ivanišević
- Manager: Tihomir Trogrlić
- League: 1. ŽNL Splitsko-dalmatinska
- 2022–23: 11th
Home colours	Away colours

Nogometni Klub Orkan Dugi Rat (Football Club Orkan Dugi Rat), commonly referred to as Orkan, is a Croatian football club based in the town of Dugi Rat, in the southern Croatian region of Dalmatia. They currently compete in Prva Županijska Liga (South), Croatia's fourth level. Orkan play their home matches at the 3,000-capacity ŠRC Dalmacija, built in 1978. Orkan has produced many players who went on to have successful careers, including Tomislav Erceg, Tonči Gabrić, and Tonči Žilić. Antun Lokošek coached the club in the Yugoslav period.
